= Domingo Queralt =

Spanish footballer

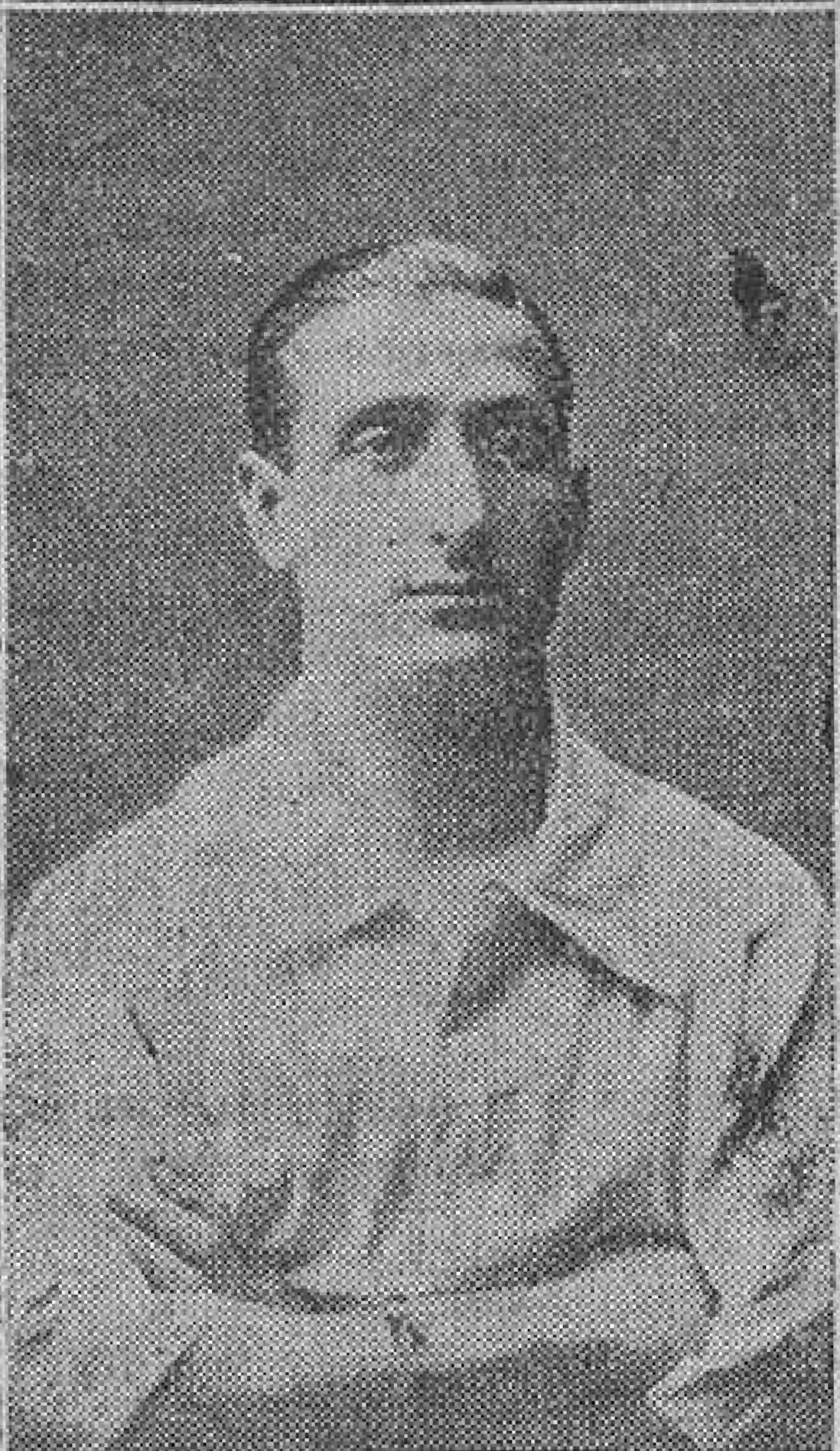

Personal information
- Full name: Domingo Queralt
- Date of birth: 1898
- Place of birth: Pontevedra, Vigo, Spain
- Date of death: 1932 (aged 34)
- Position: Midfielder

Senior career*
Years	Team	Apps	(Gls)
–1923	Sporting de Vigo		
1923–1927	Celta de Vigo		

International career
1922–1923	Galicia		
Medal record
Galicia
Prince of Asturias Cup
Silver medal – second place	1922-23 Prince of Asturias Cup	Team
- * Club domestic league appearances and goals

Domingo Queralt (1898 in Vigo - 1932) was a Spanish footballer who played as a midfielder. He was part of the first-ever team fielded by Celta de Vigo in 1923.

== Club career ==
Born in Vigo, he began his career at his hometown club Sporting de Vigo, where he played alongside the likes of Luis Otero, Moncho Gil and Ramón González, all of which being members of the Spanish team that won the silver medal at the 1920 Summer Olympics. He played for them until 1923, when it was merged with Fortuna de Vigo to form Celta de Vigo. Queralt played in the last match that was held between these two rivals on 11 March 1923, which Sporting won 1–0, courtesy of a goal from González. The presentation match of Celta de Vigo was held at Coia on 16 September 1923, in a meeting between an A and a B team formed with the players from the club, taking advantage of the large team available that they had, and Queralt was one of the 11 footballers that lined-up for the B team. Queralt played in all matches in Celta's first-ever Galician Championship title in 1923–24, before helping the club to a further two titles in the following two seasons, before retiring in 1927.

== International career ==
Being a player of Real Vigo Sporting, he was summoned to play for the Galicia national team, and he was one of the eleven footballers that played in the team's first-ever game on 19 November 1922, a 4–1 win over a Castile/Madrid XI in the quarter-finals of the 1922-23 Prince of Asturias Cup, an inter-regional competition organized by the RFEF. Queralt also played in the final, where they were beaten 1-3 by Asturias national team, courtesy of a second-half brace from José Luis Zabala.

== Honours ==
=== Club ===
Sporting de Vigo

Galician Championship:

- Winners (1) 1922-23

Celta de Vigo

Galician Championship:

- Winners (3) 1923–24, 1924–25, 1925–26

=== International ===
Galicia

Prince of Asturias Cup:

- Runner-up (1): 1922-23
