= Pepe Hermida =

Spanish footballer (1897–1970)

Personal information
- Full name: José Hermida Losada
- Date of birth: 12 August 1897
- Place of birth: Vigo, Galicia, Spain
- Date of death: 11 August 1970 (aged 72)
- Place of death: Pontevedra, Galicia, Spain
- Position: Midfielder

Senior career*
Years	Team	Apps	(Gls)
–1923	Real Vigo Sporting		
1923–1933	Celta de Vigo		
1933–1939	Deportivo de La Coruña		

International career
1922–1923	Galicia	+3	(1)
Medal record
Galicia
Prince of Asturias Cup
Silver medal – second place	1922–23 Prince of Asturias Cup	Team
- * Club domestic league appearances and goals

José Hermida Losada, better known as Pepe Hermida (12 August 1897 - 11 August 1970), was a Spanish footballer who played as a midfielder for Celta de Vigo. He was part of the first-ever team fielded by Celta de Vigo in 1923. He also played for the Galicia national team between 1922 and 1923.

He was born to a family of football players who left their mark on Celta de Vigo, coinciding at Celta with his brother Ángel Hermida, known as Carburo, and years later, another relative of his, his nephew, Manuel Hermida, known as Hermidita, became one of the great legends of the Balaidos club.

== Club career ==
Playing as a midfielder, and sometimes as a defender, he stood out at Vigo Sporting, for whom he played until it merged with their city rivals Fortuna de Vigo in 1923, thus forming Celta de Vigo, and he became one of the founding footballers of the new team from Vigo. On 11 March 1923, Hermida played in the last match that was held between these two rivals, which Sporting won 1–0, courtesy of a goal from Ramón González. The presentation match of Celta de Vigo was held at Coia on 16 September 1923, in a meeting between A and B teams, taking advantage of the large pool that they had following the merger, and Hermida was one of the 11 footballers that lined-up for the A team.

Together with Polo Pardo, the Clemente brothers (Juanito, Balbino), Ramón González, he was part of the newly founded Celta team that won three Galician Championships in a row between 1923 and 1926. He then won a further three Galician Championships for a total of six during his career at Celta (1927–28, 1929–30 and 1931–32). In 1928, Hermida was part of another historic Celta line-up, the one which played Celta's first-ever national competitive match, in the 1928 Copa del Rey against Athletic Club de Bilbao.

His last triumph with Celta came in 1932, the year in which he left Celta after 9 seasons and six titles at the age of 34. He debuted in the newly created Spanish national league in 1929, but he was unable to help Celta achieve promotion to the first division since the long-awaited promotion did not come until 1936.

== International career ==
Like many other Fortuna de Vigo players of his time, he was eligible to play for the Galicia national team, and he was one of the eleven footballers that played in the team's first-ever game on 19 November 1922, a 4–1 win over a Castile/Madrid XI in the quarter-finals of the 1922–23 Prince of Asturias Cup. He also started in the semi-finals in yet another 4–1 win, thus helping the team reach the final, which ended in a 1–3 loss to Asturias, courtesy of a second-half brace from José Luis Zabala. He also particided in the following edition, which ended in a quarter-final exit.

== Death ==
Pepe Hermida died on 11 August 1970, at age 72.

== Honours ==
=== Club ===
Real Vigo Sporting

- Galician Championship:
  - Winners (1) 1922–23

Celta de Vigo

- Galician Championship:
  - Winners (1) 1923–24, 1924–25, 1925–26, 1927–28, 1929–30 and 1931–32

Deportivo de La Coruña

- Galician Championship:
  - Winners (1) 1927–28

=== International ===
Galicia

- Prince of Asturias Cup:
  - Runner-up (1): 1922–23
