= Pedro Pinilla =

Spanish footballer

Personal information
- Full name: Pedro Martínez Pinilla
- Date of birth: 25 October 1895
- Place of birth: Vigo, Galicia, Spain
- Date of death: January 1982 (aged 86)
- Position: Forward

Senior career*
Years	Team	Apps	(Gls)
- Fortuna de Vigo
1918–1923	Real Vigo Sporting		
1923–1927	Celta de Vigo		
1927–1929	Deportivo de La Coruña		

International career
1922–1923	Galicia	3	(1)
Medal record
Galicia
Prince of Asturias Cup
Silver medal – second place	1922–23 Prince of Asturias Cup	Team
- * Club domestic league appearances and goals

Pedro Martínez Pinilla (25 October 1895 – January 1982) was a Spanish footballer who played as a forward for Celta de Vigo. Pinilla had the honor of playing in the first official match in the history of Celta, scoring the opening goal in a 2–0 win over Unión Sporting Club on 7 October of 1923. He also played for the Galicia national team between 1922 and 1923.

== Club career ==
Born in Vigo, Galicia, he played for both Fortuna de Vigo and Real Vigo Sporting, playing with the latter until 1923, when the two Vigo clubs merged, thus forming Celta de Vigo. On 11 March 1923, Pinilla played in the last match that was held between these two rivals, which Sporting won 1–0, courtesy of a goal from Ramón González. The presentation match of Celta de Vigo was held at Coia on 16 September 1923, in a meeting between A and B teams, taking advantage of the large pool that they had following the merger, and Pinilla was one of the 11 footballers that lined-up for the A team. Pinilla played in the first official match in the history of Celta, scoring the opening goal in a 2–0 win over Unión Sporting Club on 7 October of 1923.

Together with Polo Pardo, the Clemente brothers (Juanito, Balbino), Ramón González, he was part of the newly founded Celta team that won three Galician Championships in a row between 1923 and 1926. Pinilla was an exceptional striker, netting 18 goals in a total of 36 official matches with Celta. On 28 February 1926, he scored six goals in a single game against Leonesa, in the round of 16 of the 1926 Copa del Rey. This record was equaled by Manuel Posada a few months later and surpassed only by one player in the club's history, Rogelio Tapia, who scored 8 in a single game.

At a time when the cards did not exist and the chronicles rarely reported expulsions despite the harshness with which the players were used; Pedro Pinilla holds the peculiar distinction of being one of the few to have been sent off twice. A remarkable achievement, especially considering the fact that in the 1920s, Celta only found two more expulsions: Lilo on one occasion and Polo on another.

On 1 May 1927, Pinilla played his last match with Celta, a play-off for the 1927 Copa del Rey against Arenas de Getxo. After leaving Celta in 1927, he signed for Deportivo de La Coruña, where he played two seasons (1927–28 and 1928–29) and where he was once the Galician champion, thus winning the Galician Championship with three different clubs: with Vigo Sporting (1922–23), with Real Club Celta (1925–26), and with RCD de A Coruña (1927–28).

== International career ==
Like many other Fortuna de Vigo players of his time, he was eligible to play for the Galicia national team, and he was one of the eleven footballers that played in the team's first-ever game on 19 November 1922, a 4–1 win over a Castile/Madrid XI in the quarter-finals of the 1922–23 Prince of Asturias Cup, netting his side's third goal from the penalty spot. He also started in the semi-finals in yet another 4–1 win, thus helping the team reach the final, which he did not play, and without him, Galicia lost 1–3 to Asturias.

Pinilla scored a total of 5 goals in 10 games with the Galician team, between 1922 and 1924, helping his side to 8 victories and receiving only two defeats, the first of which took place on 25 November 1923 in the quarter-finals of the 1923–24 Prince of Asturias Cup, a 0–1 loss to the Castile/Madrid XI.

Pedro Pinilla died in January 1982, at the age of 86.

=== International goals ===
Galicia score listed first, score column indicates score after each Pinilla goal.

List of international goals scored by Pedro Pinilla
No.	Date	Venue	Opponent	Score	Result	Competition
1	19 November 1922	Coia, Vigo, Spain	Centro	3–1	4–1	1922–23 Prince of Asturias Cup quarter-final
2	21 January 1923	Coia, Pontevedra, Spain	Royal Navy XI		8–2	Friendly
3	21 January 1923	Coia, Pontevedra, Spain	Royal Navy XI		8–2	Friendly
4	21 January 1923	Coia, Pontevedra, Spain	Royal Navy XI		8–2	Friendly
5	27 May 1923	Campo Grande, Lisbon, Portugal	Lisbon XI		1–2	Friendly

== Honours ==
=== Club ===
Real Vigo Sporting

- Galician Championship:
  - Winners (1) 1922–23

Celta de Vigo

- Galician Championship:
  - Winners (1) 1925–26

Deportivo de La Coruña

- Galician Championship:
  - Winners (1) 1927–28

=== International ===
Galicia

- Prince of Asturias Cup:
  - Runner-up (1): 1922–23
