= Luis Otero (footballer) =

Spanish footballer (1893–1955)

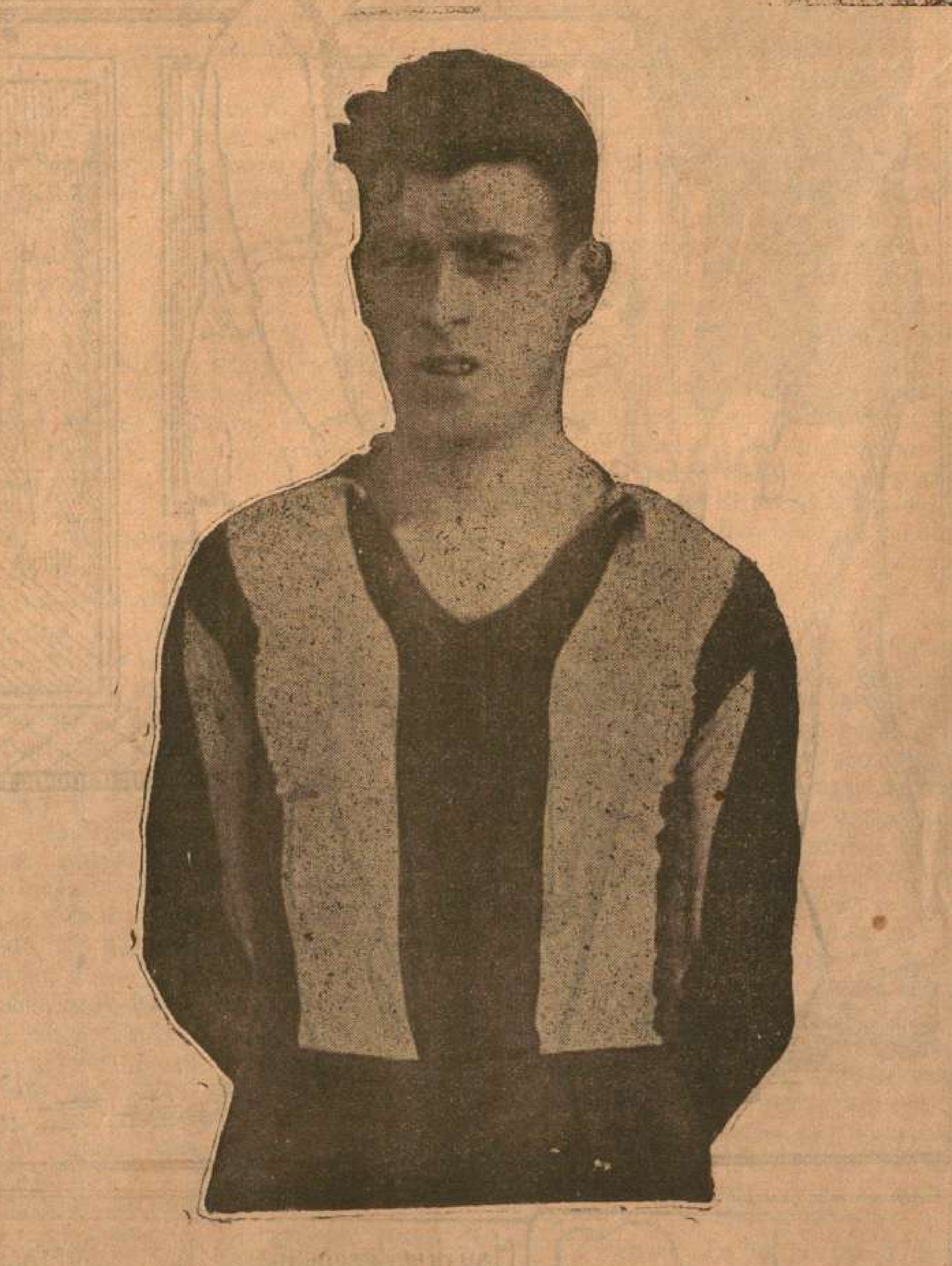
- Otero in 1929

Personal information
- Full name: Luis Otero Sánchez-Encinas
- Date of birth: 22 October 1893
- Place of birth: Pontevedra, Galicia, Spain
- Date of death: 20 January 1955 (aged 61)
- Place of death: A Coruña, Galicia, Spain
- Position: Defender

Senior career*
Years	Team	Apps	(Gls)
1909–1911	Pontevedra Sporting Club		
1911–1923	Real Vigo Sporting		
1923–1924	Celta de Vigo		
1924–1930	Deportivo de La Coruña		

International career
1920–1924	Spain	4	(0)
1922–1923	Galicia		
Medal record
Men's football
Representing Spain
Olympic Games
Silver medal – second place	1920 Antwerp	Team competition
Representing Galicia
Prince of Asturias Cup
Silver medal – second place	1922-23 Prince of Asturias Cup	Team
- * Club domestic league appearances and goals

Luis Otero Sánchez-Encinas (22 October 1893 – 20 January 1955) was a Spanish footballer who played as a defender and who competed in the 1920 Summer Olympics, being a member of the Spanish team that won the silver medal at the tournament.

Otero is recognized as one of the most outstanding Galician footballers in history. He was part of the first teams of both Celta de Vigo and the Spanish team, and along with Moncho Gil, he is the first Galician Olympic medalist.

In his memory, the Luis Otero Trophy has been held in Pontevedra since 1959.

== Club career ==
Born in Pontevedra, he began playing football at the age of 16 at his hometown club, Pontevedra Sporting Club in 1909, and two years later he moved to Real Vigo Sporting. After playing with Sporting for almost a decade, winning four Galician Championships and reaching the semifinals of the Copa del Rey twice (in 1919 and 1920), he left the club shortly after it merged with Fortuna de Vigo to form Celta de Vigo in 1923.

Although he seemed destined to be one of the mainstays of Celta de Vigo, Luis Otero, along with two other players - Chiarroni and González -, not satisfied with the discipline of the new club, left the entity before the start of the 1923 Galician Championship to sign for Deportivo de La Coruña, which ultimately proved to be one of the triggers of the historical rivalry between the Vigo and Coruña teams. Celta sued Deportivo for bribery and these protests led the Galician Federation to suspend the three "runaway" footballers for a season, accusing them of professionalism, while Deportivo was forbidden of lining them up in the Galician Championship. However, Deportivo appealed to the Royal Spanish Football Federation, which ruled in favor of Deportivo and annulled the sanction against the club on the understanding that there had been no bribery, urging the Galician Federation to readmit Deportivo to the championship, although it maintained the sanction on the three players for having duplicate records.

The Galician Federation agreed by majority to accept the verdict of the Spanish Federation. At the end of his suspension, Otero returned to Deportivo, where he played six seasons, winning two more Galician Championships.

== International career ==
On 28 August 1920, Otero went down in history as one of the eleven footballers who played in the first game of the Spanish national team at the 1920 Summer Olympics, in an eventual 1–0 victory over Denmark. He also featured in the second round of the repechage tournament against Italy which Spain won 2–0, winning the silver medal three days later after beating the Netherlands 3–1, making Otero and Moncho Gil the first Galician Olympic medalists in history. In total, he earned four caps for Spain, two at the 1920 Olympics and two in friendlies, the last of which was on 21 December 1924 at Les Corts in a 2–1 win over Austria.

Being a player of Real Vigo Sporting, he was summoned to play for the Galicia national team, and he was one of the eleven footballers that played in the first game of the team's history, a 4–1 win over a Castile/Madrid XI in the quarter-finals of the 1922-23 Prince of Asturias Cup, an inter-regional competition organized by the RFEF. Otero was a member of the Galacian team that reached that tournament's final, in which they lost 1–3 to Asturias national team, courtesy of a second-half brace from José Luis Zabala.

== Honours ==
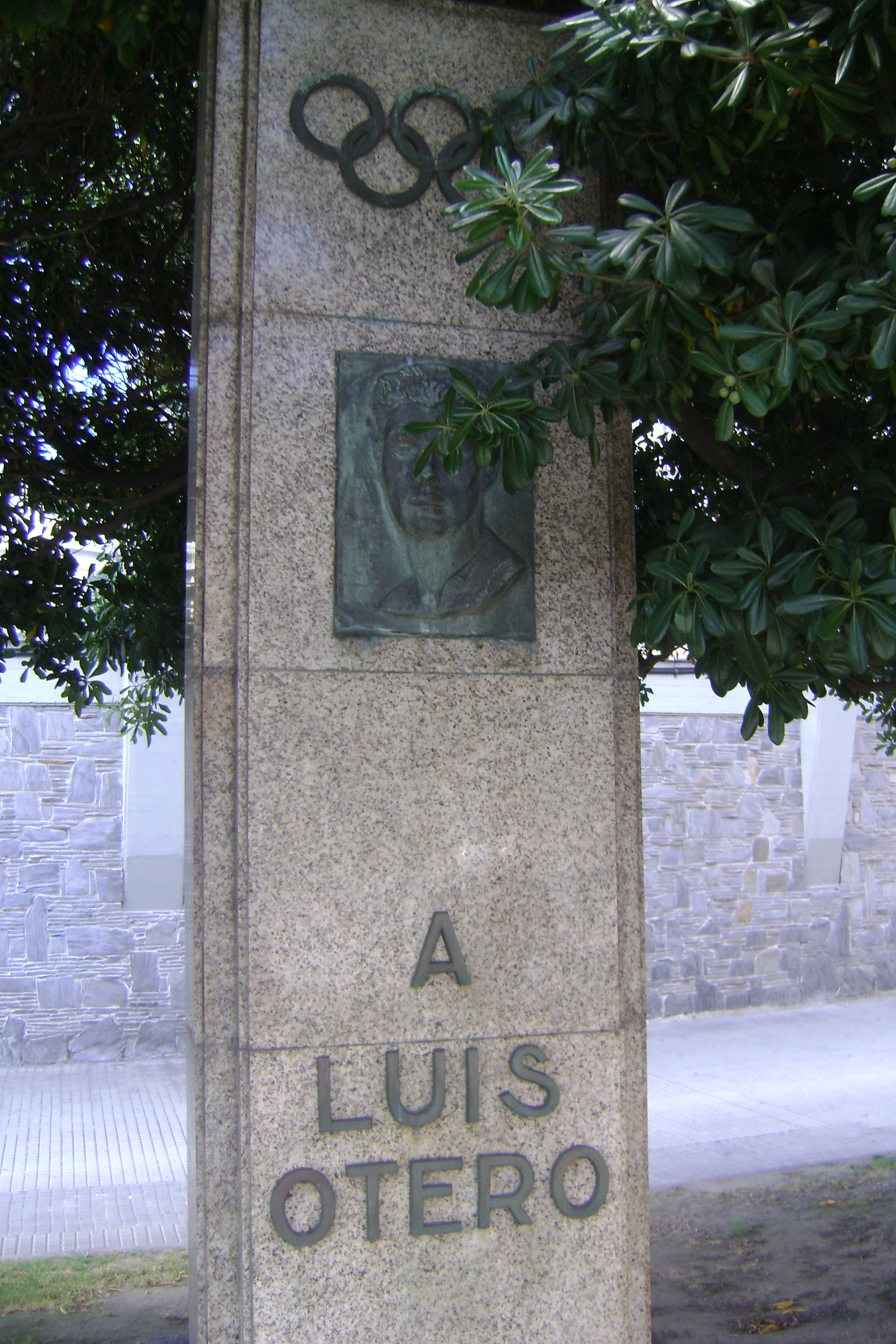
Sculpture dedicated to Luis Otero near the Estadio Riazor, A Coruña

=== Club ===
Real Vigo Sporting

Galician Championship

- Winners (4) 1914, 1919, 1920, 1923

Deportivo de La Coruña

Galician Championship

- Winners (2) 1926–27, 1927–28

=== International ===
Spain

- Olympic Games silver medal: 1920

Asturias

Prince of Asturias Cup runner-up (1): 1922–23
