= José Chiarroni =

Spanish footballer

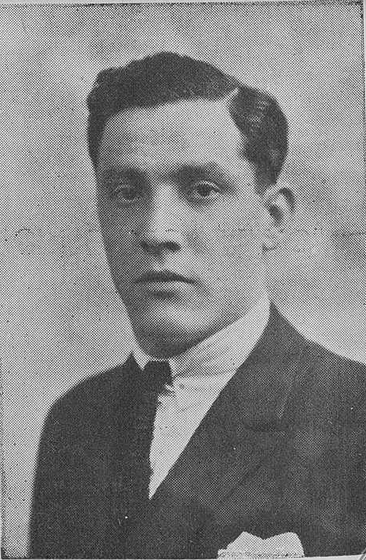

Personal information
- Full name: José Chiarroni Pazos
- Date of birth: 6 January 1898
- Place of birth: Vigo, Galicia, Spain
- Date of death: 10 March 1944 (aged 46)
- Place of death: Galicia, Spain
- Position: Center-forward

Senior career*
Years	Team	Apps	(Gls)
1914–1923	Real Vigo Sporting		
1923–1924	Celta de Vigo		
1924–1929	Deportivo de La Coruña		

International career
1922–1923	Galicia		
Medal record
Galicia
Prince of Asturias Cup
Silver medal – second place	1922-23 Prince of Asturias Cup	Team
- * Club domestic league appearances and goals

José Chiarroni Pazos (6 January 1898 - 10 March 1944) was a Spanish footballer of the 1920s who played as a center-forward.

== Club career ==
Born in Vigo, Galicia, he began playing football at his hometown club Real Vigo Sporting in 1914, and he helped Sporting to win five Galician Championships in 1913–14, 1916–17, 1918–19, 1919–20 and 1922–23. He remained there until Sporting was merged with Fortuna de Vigo in 1923, to form Celta de Vigo. The Celta presentation match was held on 14 September 1923 between an A and a B team formed with the players from the club, taking advantage of the large team available that they had, however, both Chiarroni and Ramón González were absent from it. Coincidence or not, the two of them, along with Luis Otero, not satisfied with the discipline of this new club, left the entity before the start of the 1923 Galician Championship to sign for Deportivo de La Coruña, which was one of the triggers of the historical rivalry between the Vigo and Coruña teams. Celta sued Deportivo for bribery and these protests led the Galician Federation to suspend the three "runaway" footballers for a season, accusing them of professionalism, while Deportivo was forbidden to line them up in the Galician Championship. However, Deportivo appealed to the Royal Spanish Football Federation, which ruled in favor of Deportivo and annulled the sanction against the club on the understanding that there had been no bribery, urging the Galician Federation to readmit Deportivo to the championship, although it maintained the sanction on the three players for having duplicate records. The Galician Federation agreed by majority to accept the verdict of the Spanish Federation.

With Celta he only played friendly matches, such as the one held in the summer of 1924 against the Uruguay national team which would go on to win the 1924 Summer Olympics in Paris. At the end of his suspension in 1924, he officially became part of the Deportivo team, where he remained until 1929, winning the Galicia Championship two more times.

== International career ==
Being a player of Real Vigo Sporting, he was summoned to play for the Galicia national team, and he was one of the eleven footballers that played in the team's first-ever game on 19 November 1922, a 4–1 win over a Castile/Madrid XI in the quarter-finals of the 1922-23 Prince of Asturias Cup, with Chiarroni being the author of the team's first-ever goal. He also scored in the semi-finals in yet another 4–1 win, this time over an Andalusia XI, thus helping the team reach the final, which they lost 1–3 to Asturias.

=== International goals ===
Galicia score is listed first, score column indicates score after each Chiarroni goal.

List of international goals scored by José Chiarroni
No.	Date	Venue	Opponent	Score	Result	Competition
1	19 November 1922	Coia, Vigo, Spain	Centro	1–0	4–1	1922–23 Prince of Asturias Cup quarter-final
2	14 January 1923	Reina Victoria, Seville, Spain	(Andalusia) South	4–1	4–1	1922–23 Prince of Asturias Cup semi-final
3	28 January 1923	Bouzas, Vigo, Spain	Pontevedra XI	4–1	4–1	Friendly
4	4 February 1923	Pasarón, Pontevedra, Spain	Pontevedra XI	2–0	3–1	Friendly
5	4 February 1923	Pasarón, Pontevedra, Spain	Pontevedra XI	3–1	3–1	Friendly
6	18 February 1923	Coia, Pontevedra, Spain	Ferrol/A Coruña XI		7–1	Friendly
7	18 February 1923	Coia, Pontevedra, Spain	Ferrol/A Coruña XI		7–1	Friendly

== Honours ==
=== Club ===
Real Vigo Sporting

Galician Championship:

- Winners (6) 1913–14, 1916–17, 1918–19, 1919–20 and 1922–23

Deportivo de La Coruña

Galician Championship:

- Winners (2) 1926-27 and 1927–28

=== International ===
Galicia

Prince of Asturias Cup:

- Runner-up (1): 1922-23
