= Ramón Gil =

Spanish footballer

Personal information
- Full name: Ramón Gil Sequeiros
- Date of birth: 16 August 1897
- Place of birth: A Coruña, Galicia, Spain
- Date of death: 18 January 1965 (aged 66)
- Position: Forward

Senior career*
| Years | Team | Apps | (Gls) |
| 1914–1917 | Deportivo Fabril | | |
| 1917–1918 | Real Club Coruña | | |
| 1918–1923 | Real Vigo Sporting | | |
| 1923 | Celta de Vigo | | |
| 1924–1931 | Deportivo de La Coruña | | |

International career
| 1920 | Spain | 0 | (0) |
| 1922–1923 | Galicia | | (7) |
Medal record
Men's football
Spain
Olympic Games
| Silver medal – second place | 1920 Antwerp | Team competition |
Galicia
Prince of Asturias Cup
| Silver medal – second place | 1922-23 Prince of Asturias Cup | Team |
- * Club domestic league appearances and goals

Ramón "Moncho" Gil Sequeiros (16 August 1897 – 18 January 1965) was a Spanish football player who played as a forward. He was a member of the Spain national team that won the silver medal at the 1920 Summer Olympics.

== Club career ==
Born in Vigo, he began playing football at his hometown club Real Vigo Sporting in 1917, and he helped them win three Galician Championships in 1918-19, 1919-20 and 1922-23. He played for them until 1923, when Sporting was merged with Fortuna de Vigo to form Celta de Vigo. He was then part of the first-ever teams fielded by Celta de Vigo and played for them for four seasons.

== International career ==
He represented the Spain national team at the 1920 Summer Olympics, featuring in two games against Italy and in the Silver/Bronze medal match against the Netherlands which Spain won 3-1.

Being a player of Real Vigo Sporting, he was summoned to play for the Galicia national team, and he was one of the eleven footballers that played in the team's first-ever game on 19 November 1922, a 4-1 win over a Castile/Madrid XI in the quarter-finals of the 1922-23 Prince of Asturias Cup, an inter-regional competition organized by the RFEF. Moncho Gil helped the team reach the final, where they were beaten 1-3 by Asturias national team, courtesy of a second-half brace from José Luis Zabala.

== Honours ==
=== Club ===
Real Vigo Sporting

Galician Championship:

- Winners (3) 1918-19, 1919-20 and 1922-23

=== International ===
Spain

- Olympic Games Silver medal: 1920

Asturias

Prince of Asturias Cup:

- Runner-up (1): 1922-23
