= José Arruza =

Spanish footballer

Personal information
- Date of birth: Unknown
- Place of birth: Getxo, Biscay, Spain
- Date of death: Unknown
- Position: Midfielder

Senior career*
Years	Team	Apps	(Gls)
1918–1924	Arenas de Getxo		

International career
1922–1924	Biscay	+4	(0)
- * Club domestic league appearances and goals

José Arruza was a Spanish footballer who played as a midfielder for Arenas de Getxo. The dates of his birth and death are unknown.

== Biography ==
Born in Getxo, Arruza began his career at his hometown club Arenas de Getxo, and he was a member of the team that won the 1919 Copa del Rey Final after beating FC Barcelona 5–2. Arruza played a few games for the Biscay team, participating in both the 1922–23 and the 1923–24 Prince of Asturias Cups, an official inter-regional competition organized by the RFEF. Both campaigns ended in narrow defeats to Asturias (3–4) and Catalonia (0–1). In the quarter-finals of the 1922–23 edition against Asturias, Arruza is listed in some sources as one of the goalscorers in a 1–1 draw that forced the replay in which they lost.

== Honours ==
Arenas Club

- North Championship: 1918–19, 1921–22
- Copa del Rey: 1919
