= Rogelio Barril =

Spanish footballer

Personal information
- Full name: Rogelio Barril Fernández
- Date of birth: 1 March 1898
- Place of birth: Avilés, Asturias, Spain
- Date of death: Unknown
- Position: Forward

Senior career*
Years	Team	Apps	(Gls)
1917–1926	Stadium Ovetense		
1926–1931	Real Oviedo	66	(43)

International career
1922-1923	Asturias	7	(2)
- * Club domestic league appearances and goals

Rogelio Barril Fernández (1 March 1898 – Unknown) was a Spanish footballer who played as a forward for Real Oviedo. He is best known for scoring the first goal in the history of Real Oviedo in an official match.

== Club career ==
Born in Asturias, he began his career at his hometown club Stadium Ovetense during the 1917–18 season, and he remained loyal to the club until it was merged with Real Club Deportivo Oviedo in 1926, to form Real Oviedo. Barril started in the presentation match of this new team was a friendly held on 26 March 1926 against Arenas de Getxo at the Teatinos stadium in Oviedo, ending in a 6–4 victory. Barril was also one of the eleven footballers who played in the first official game of the club on 17 October 1926, in which Barril opened the scoring in an eventual 8–2 win over Racing de Sama, thus becoming the author of Real Oviedo's first-ever goal in an official competition. Furthermore, before the match had even reached the half-hour mark, Barril had also become the first scorer of a hat-trick for Real Oviedo in an official match (6th, 17th and 28th).

On 24 February 1929, Barril netted 5 goals in a 6–2 win over Sporting de Gijón in a Second Division match. Barril remained loyal to Real Oviedo from 1926 to 1931, when he decided to hang up his boots. In this he played 66 official matches, scoring a total of 43 goals.

== International career ==
Like many other Real Oviedo of that time, he played several matches for the Asturias national team, being one of the eleven footballers that played in the team's first-ever game on 4 June 1922, in a Friendly against St Mirren F.C. which ended in a 3–7 loss. Barril was a member of the Asturian team that won the 1922–23 Prince of Asturias Cup, an official inter-regional competition organized by the RFEF. After a 1–1 draw with Biscay in the quarter-finals, they faced them again the following day, and again they drew at 1, thus forcing extra-time where again both teams scored, so another period of extra-time was played and despite the tiredness, Barril managed to net twice in the 125th and 144th minutes to give his side a 4–3 hard fought win. Together with Manuel Argüelles, Manuel Meana and José Luis Zabala, he featured in the semi-finals as Asturias beat Catalonia (1–0) and then started in the final where they defeated Galicia 3–1 to lift the trophy for the first time in the team's history.

However, the following edition of the competition wasn't as successful as Asturias were knocked out by Biscay in the quarter-finals.

== Honours ==
=== International ===
Asturias XI

- Prince of Asturias Cup:
  - Champions (1): 1922–23
