= Ramón González (footballer, born 1898) =

Spanish footballer

Ramón
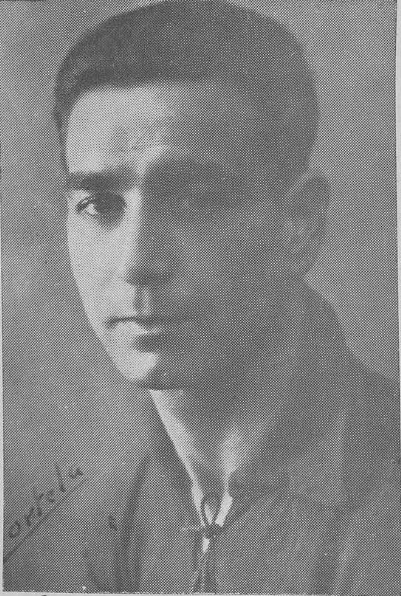

Personal information
- Full name: Ramón González Figueroa
- Date of birth: 16 February 1898
- Place of birth: A Coruña, Galicia, Spain
- Date of death: 4 November 1977 (aged 79)
- Position: Centre forward

Senior career*
Years	Team	Apps	(Gls)
1914–1917	Deportivo Fabril		
1917–1918	Real Club Coruña		
1918–1923	Real Vigo Sporting		
1923	Celta de Vigo		
1924–1931	Deportivo de La Coruña	22	(10)

International career
1922–1923	Galicia	4+	(7)
Medal record
Men's football
Spain
Olympic Games
Silver medal – second place	1920 Antwerp	Team competition
Galicia
Prince of Asturias Cup
Silver medal – second place	1922–23 Prince of Asturias Cup	Team
- * Club domestic league appearances and goals

Ramón González Figueroa (16 February 1898 – 4 November 1977) was a Spanish footballer who played as a centre forward. He was a member of the Spanish squad that competed in the 1920 Summer Olympics, but did not make any appearances.

== Club career ==
Born in Vigo, Galicia, he began playing football at his hometown club Deportivo Fabril in 1914, the same year the club was created. At Fabril he stood out for his goal-scoring instinct, which earned him a move to Real Club Coruña in 1917. After one season he joined Real Vigo Sporting in 1918, where he was pivotal in Sporting's back-to-back Galician Championship titles in 1918–19 and 1919–20, and one more in 1922–23. He remained with the club until 1923, when Sporting was merged with Fortuna de Vigo to form Celta de Vigo. The last derby between Sporting and Fortuna was held on 11 March 1923, and Sporting won 1–0 thanks to a goal from Ramón, thus sealing a historic victory that also meant they won the 1922–23 Galician championship. The Celta presentation match was held on 14 September 1923 between A and B teams, taking advantage of the large pool that they ha following the merger; however, both Ramón and José Chiarroni were absent from it. Coincidence or not, the two of them, along with Luis Otero, not satisfied with the discipline of this new club, left Celta before the start of the 1923–24 Galician Championship to sign for Deportivo de La Coruña. Celta sued Deportivo for bribery and accused the players of professionalism (which at that time was not allowed in Spanish football) and this triggered a legal battle that started the enduring rivalry between the Vigo and Coruña teams. Celta's protests led the Galician Federation to suspend the three "runaway" footballers for a season, while Deportivo was forbidden from selecting them in the Galician Championship. However, Deportivo appealed to the Royal Spanish Football Federation, which ruled in favor of Deportivo and annulled the sanction against the club on the understanding that there had been no bribery, urging the Galician Federation to readmit Deportivo to the championship, although it maintained the sanction on the three players for having duplicate records. The Galician Federation agreed by majority to accept the verdict of the Spanish Federation.

At the end of his suspension, he was finally able to make his debut for Deportivo in 1924, and in April of that same year, he already was the captain of the club. One of his first major performances came in June when he scored seven goals in two games against Scotland's Dundee F.C. In 1927, he was out for several months after he received a severe blow in a match in Pontevedra, which kept him unconscious for almost a day. Although with a lower performance rate after his return, he continued at the 'blue and whites', playing a single match in La Liga and two seasons in the Segunda División after the creation of the Spanish football league system in 1928. He played his last game in 1931 against Racing de Ferrol at the old Campo de Riazor.

== International career ==
Ramón was a member of the Spanish squad that competed in the 1920 Summer Olympics, but did not make any appearances as Spain won the silver medal after beating the Netherlands 3–1, which made him, along with Luis Otero and Moncho Gil, the first Galician Olympic medalists in history.

Like many other Real Vigo Sporting players of that time, he played several matches for the Galicia regional team; he was one of the eleven footballers that played in the team's first-ever game on 19 November 1922, and netted the game's final goal as Galicia beat the Castile/Madrid XI 4–1 in the quarter-finals of the 1922–23 Prince of Asturias Cup, an inter-regional competition organized by the RFEF. He helped the team reach the final with two goals in the semi-finals in another 4–1 win, this time over a Andalusia XI. Seven days before the final, on 18 February 1923, Ramón showed he was in great goalscoring form when he netted a hat-trick in a 7–1 friendly win against a Ferrol/A Coruña XI; however, he also got injured, which prevented him from playing the final, and without him Galicia lost 1–3 to Asturias. With three goals in the Prince of Asturias Cup, he is among the all-time top goal scorers in the competition's history.

=== International goals ===
Galicia score listed first, score column indicates score after each Ramón goal.

List of international goals scored by Ramón González
No.	Date	Venue	Opponent	Score	Result	Competition
1	19 November 1922	Coia, Vigo, Spain	Centro	4–1	4–1	1922–23 Prince of Asturias Cup quarter-final
2	14 January 1923	Reina Victoria, Seville, Spain	(Andalusia) South	3–1	4–1	1922–23 Prince of Asturias Cup semi-final replay
3	14 January 1923	Reina Victoria, Seville, Spain	(Andalusia) South	4–1	4–1	1922–23 Prince of Asturias Cup semi-final replay
4	21 January 1923	Coia, Vigo, Spain	Royal Navy XI		8–2	Friendly
5	18 February 1923	Coia, Vigo, Spain	Ferrol/A Coruña XI	1–0	7–1	Friendly
6	18 February 1923	Coia, Vigo, Spain	Ferrol/A Coruña XI		7–1	Friendly
7	18 February 1923	Coia, Vigo, Spain	Ferrol/A Coruña XI		7–1	Friendly

== Honours ==
=== Club ===
Real Vigo Sporting

- Galician Championship: 1918–19, 1919–20, 1922–23

Deportivo de La Coruña

- Galician Championship: 1926–27, 1927–28 and 1930–31

=== International ===
Spain

- Olympic Games Silver medal: 1920

Asturias

- Prince of Asturias Cup: Runner-up 1922–23
