= Andalusia national football team =

Andalusia
- Nickname: El Olivo Mecánico
- Association: Andalusia Football Federation
- Head coach: Adolfo Aldana
- Home stadium: La Cartuja
First colours	Second colours

First international
- Valencian Community 1–2 Andalusia (Valencia, Valencian Community; 19 November 1922)

Biggest win
- Andalusia 5–1 Catalonia (Seville, Andalusia; 1 January 1936)

Biggest defeat
- Castile 4–0 Andalusia (Madrid, Madrid; 28 October 1963)

The Andalusia national football team is the national football team of Andalusia. They are not affiliated with FIFA or UEFA, because Andalusia is represented internationally by the Spain national football team. It mostly plays only friendly matches.

== History ==
In the first half of the 1920s, the Sur regional federation, which encompassed the Andalusia region and organised the Campeonato Regional Sur for the local clubs (dominated by Sevilla FC), decided to follow the examples of the Catalan and Centro regional federations and selected a representative team for occasional friendly matches, however, they instead made their official debut in a competitive match, in the 1922–23 Prince of Asturias Cup, an official inter-regional tournament organized by RFEF. They participated in two editions, being knocked-out in the semi-finals by the eventual Runner-up on both occasions.

During the Iberoamerican Expo in Seville, 1929, Andalusia played a friendly match against Club Atlético Boca Juniors in Estadio de Heliopolis, known today as Estadio Benito Villamarín.

They rarely played again until 1963, when they were invited by the Castilian Federation to its 50-year celebrations, playing against Biscay and then Castile. Two years later, during the Andalusia Football Federation's own 'golden jubilee', the regional select played against Paraguay in Estadio Sánchez Pizjuán, Seville.

In the early years of the 21st century, Andalusia played an annual fixture, usually each winter, facing the likes of Estonia, Morocco, Latvia, Chile and Malta. However, other than the regions such as Catalonia and the Basque Country with leanings towards independence whose matches draw larger crowds, matches were rarely played by the Spanish regions in the subsequent years as they did not prove cost-effective to arrange. The main exception to this situation was when Andalucia faced Madrid for the latter's federation centenary in 2013, a repeat of their 1963 encounter.

== Selected Internationals ==
19 November 1922 1922-23 Prince of Asturias Cup quarter-finals	(Note: the Levante (Valencian Federation) team.)Valencian Community	1–2	Andalusia (Note: the Sur (South Federation) team.)	Valencia, Valencian Community
	Cubells	Report	Kinké; León	Stadium: Campo de Algirós; Referee: (Catalonia) Enrique Peris

14 January 1923 1922-23 Prince of Asturias Cup semi-finals	Andalusia	1–4	Galicia	Seville, Andalusia
	Kinké	Report	Ramón González; Ramón Polo; Chiarroni	Stadium: Reina Victoria; Referee: (Community of Madrid) Montero

11 November 1923 1923-24 Prince of Asturias Cup quarter-finals	Valencian Community	2–3	Andalusia	Valencia, Valencian Community
	Cubells (1–2)	Report	Brand (0–1); Kinké (0–2); Spencer (2–3)	Stadium: Mestalla Stadium; Referee: (Community of Madrid) Luis Colina

21 January 1924 1923-24 Prince of Asturias Cup semi-finals	(Note: the Centro (Central Federation) team.)Central Spain	2–1	Andalusia	Madrid
	Monjardín		Herminio	Stadium: Estadio Metropolitano; Referee: (Catalonia) Josep Llovera

25 January 1925 Friendly	Budapest	0–0	Andalusia	Budapeste
		Report

8 January 1928 Friendly	Andalusia	4–1	Valencian Community	Jaén, Andalusia
		Report

24 September 1935 Friendly	Catalonia	2–0	Andalusia	Barcelona, Catalonia
	Bosch 38'; Raich 77'			Stadium: Estadi d'Montjuïc; Referee: Arribas

1 January 1936 Friendly	Andalusia	5–1	Catalonia	Seville, Andalusia
		Report	Raich	Stadium: Estadio de Nervión; Referee: Ocaña

26 October 1963 FFM Trofeo Bodas de Oro	Biscay	2–2 (Note: After Extra Time. Corners were counted but also even at 9 each. Andalusia progressed on drawing of lots.)	Andalusia	Madrid
	Mauri 11'; Aguirre 89'	Report	Diéguez 10'; Ansola 44'	Stadium: Estadio Metropolitano; Attendance: 20,000; Referee: Plaza

28 October 1963 FFM Trofeo Bodas de Oro	Castile	4–0	Andalusia	Madrid
	Mendonça 3'; Puskás 77' (pen.), 87'; Yanko 86'	Report	Donato (red card)	Stadium: Santiago Bernabéu Stadium; Attendance: 40,000; Referee: Barrenechea

18 December 1974 Friendly	Andalusia	4–3	Romania	Huelva, Andalusia
	Porta 22' 33'; Acosta (pen.); López 80'	Report	Atodiresei 3'; Roznai 10'; 24'	Stadium: Estadio Colombino

8 May 1990 Friendly	Andalusia	1–1	Uruguay	Seville, Andalusia
22:00 CET	Aldana 17'		Correa 75'	Stadium: Ramón Sánchez Pizjuán; Referee: Navarrete (Spain)

31 May 1990 Friendly	Andalusia	0–0	Yugoslavia	Cádiz, Andalusia
22:00 CET				Stadium: Carranza

22 December 1998 Friendly	Andalusia	2–0	LFP combined team	Seville, Andalusia
22:00 CET	Merino 36'; Raúl Molina 59'			Stadium: Ramón Sánchez Pizjuán

28 December 1999 Friendly	Andalusia	1–0	Estonia	Granada, Andalusia
22:00 CET	Carlitos 15'			Stadium: Los Cármenes

22 December 2000 Friendly	Andalusia	2–0	Morocco	Córdoba, Andalusia
22:00 CET	Carlitos 23'; Óscar 32'			Stadium: Nuevo Arcángel

17 May 2001 Friendly	Andalusia	3–1	Iraq	Vélez-Málaga, Andalusia
22:00 CET				Stadium: Vivar Téllez

27 December 2001 Friendly	Andalusia	3–3	Tunisia	Seville, Andalusia
22:00 CET	Jesuli 33'; Tristán 65' (pen.), 70'		Boukadida 56'; Badra 75' (pen.); Baya 85'	Stadium: La Cartuja; Attendance: 20,000

27 December 2002 Friendly	Andalusia	3–2	Chile	Málaga, Andalusia
22:00 CET	Josemi 62'; Raúl Molina 76'; Manu 81'		Cristián Álvarez 67'; Quinteros 81'	Stadium: La Rosaleda; Attendance: 11,000; Referee: Antonio Jesús López Nieto

27 December 2003 Friendly	Andalusia	1–0	Latvia	Huelva, Andalusia
22:00 CET	Tristán 21'			Stadium: Colombino; Attendance: 6,000; Referee: Rafael Ramírez Domínguez

29 December 2004 Friendly	Andalusia	0–0	Malta	Seville, Andalusia
22:00 CET		Report		Stadium: Carranza; Attendance: 8,000; Referee: David Fernández Borbalán

1 June 2005 Friendly	Sevilla FC	2–4	Andalusia	Seville, Andalusia
22:00 CET	Antoñito 63'; Jesuli 85'		Tevenet 20'; Marcos Márquez 51'; Juanlu 81'; Francisco 88' (pen.)	Stadium: Ramón Sánchez Pizjuán; Referee: Luis Medina Cantalejo

28 December 2005 Friendly	Andalusia	4–1	China	Cádiz, Andalusia
22:00 CET	Tristán 2'; Navas 4'; Antoñito 57' (pen.); Marchena 76'	Report	Yi 52'	Stadium: Carranza; Attendance: 5,500; Referee: Rafael Ramírez Domínguez

27 December 2006 Friendly	Andalusia	3–1	Israel-Palestine Peace Team	Seville, Andalusia
22:00 CET	Güiza 5', 22'; Alfaro 69'	Report	Saban 43'	Stadium: La Cartuja; Attendance: 20,000; Referee: Luis Medina Cantalejo

27 December 2007 Friendly	Andalusia	4–1	Zambia	Jerez, Andalusia
22:00 CET	Arzu 26'; Barral 39' (pen.); Manu 49'; Gallardo 90+2' (pen.)	Report	Katongo 9'	Stadium: Chapín; Attendance: 5,000; Referee: José Luis Paradas Romero

7 June 2013 Friendly	Madrid	1–2	Andalusia	Madrid
20:00 CET	Riki 13' (pen.)		Barral 8', 17'	Stadium: Vallecas; Attendance: 9,000; Referee: Carlos Velasco Carballo

29 December 2016 Friendly	Andalusia	3–1	LaLiga combined team	Seville, Andalusia
19:00 CET	Marchena 37'; Sergio León 68', 88'	Report	Burgui 13'	Stadium: Benito Villamarín; Attendance: 10,000; Referee: José Luis Munuera Montero

== Coaches ==
- (Spain) José Enrique Díaz
- (Spain) Adolfo Aldana
- (Spain) Joaquín Caparrós
- (Spain) Manolo Ruiz Sosa

== Notable players ==
- (Spain) Kinké
- (Spain) Diego Tristán
- (Spain) José Antonio Reyes
- (Spain) Adrián

== See also ==
- Category:Footballers from Andalusia
