= Domingo Careaga =

Spanish footballer

Personal information
- Full name: Domingo Careaga Achalandabaso
- Date of birth: 3 August 1897
- Place of birth: Getxo, Biscay, Spain
- Date of death: 29 August 1947 (aged 50)
- Height: 1.66 m (5 ft 5 in)
- Position: Defender

Senior career*
Years	Team	Apps	(Gls)
1916–1930	Arenas de Getxo		

International career
1921–1923	Spain	4	(0)
1922–1924	Biscay	+4	(0)
- * Club domestic league appearances and goals

Domingo Careaga Achalandabaso (3 August 1897 - 29 August 1947) was a Spanish footballer who played as a defender for Arenas de Getxo. Careaga spent all 14 seasons of his playing career with Arenas de Getxo, thus being a historical member of the club and part of the so-called one-club men group. He also played in four matches for the Spain national football team between 1921 and 1923.

== Club career ==
Born in Getxo, he began his career at his hometown club Arenas de Getxo in 1916, and he remained loyal to the club for the next 14 years. He played a pivotal role in helping the Copa del Rey final on two occasions, in 1917 and 1919, which ended in a loss to Real Madrid and in a 5–2 win over FC Barcelona.

== International career ==
He made his international debut for Spain on 9 October 1921 at the 1920 Summer Olympics against gold medalists Belgium, keeping a clean-sheet in a 2-0 win. In his next cap on 16 December 1923 he scored again, netting a hat-trick in the Iberian derby to help his side to a 3-0 win. In total, he earned 4 caps in which he only conceded one goal.

Like many other Arenas de Getxo players of that time, he played a few games for the Biscay national team, participating in both the 1922–23 and the 1923–24 Prince of Asturias Cups, an official inter-regional competition organized by the RFEF. In the quarter-finals of the 1922–23 edition against Asturias, Careaga slotted a penalty in the 132nd minute of extra-time to level the scores at 3–3, but they were ultimately eliminated 3–4 courtesy of a brace from Rogelio Barril.

== Honours ==
=== Club ===
Arenas Club

- North Championships
  - Champions (5): 1916–17, 1918–19, 1921–22, 1924–25 and 1926–27
- Copa del Rey
  - Champions (1): 1919
  - Runner-up (1): 1917
