= Herminio Martínez =

Spanish footballer

Herminio
Personal information
- Full name: Herminio Martínez Álvarez
- Date of birth: 6 January 1896
- Place of birth: Bouzas, Galicia, Spain
- Date of death: 13 July 1976 (aged 80)
- Position: Forward

Senior career*
| Years | Team | Apps | (Gls) |
| 1916-1919 | Fortuna de Vigo | | |
| 1919–1927 | Sevilla | | |

International career
| 1923-1925 | Spain | 2 | (0) |
| 1922–1924 | Andalusia | | |
- * Club domestic league appearances and goals

Herminio Martínez Álvarez (6 January 1896 - 13 July 1976), or simply Herminio was a Spanish footballer who played as a forward.

== Club career ==
Born in Galicia, he began playing football at his hometown club Fortuna de Vigo in 1916. Its good characteristics became known in much of the state, which led an agent of Sevilla FC to travel to Vigo to sign him. Thus, he joined them in 1919, where he played until 1927. His retirement from football was the cause of a serious injury, the rupture of the meniscus, which at the time was incurable. This would be the first of several misfortunes he suffered, such as the bombing of Córdoba during the Spanish Civil War or a thrombosis from which he would no longer recover.

== International career ==
He earned two caps for Spain, both of which came against Portugal on 16 December 1923 and 17 May 1925, and both ended in victories.

Being a player of Sevilla FC, he was summoned to play for the Andalusia national team, and he was one of the eleven footballers that played in the team's first-ever game on 19 November 1922 against a Valencia XI, the quarter-finals of the 1922-23 Prince of Asturias Cup, and he helped his side achieve a 2-1 win, but they were knocked out in the semi-finals by Galicia and in the following campaign they lost in the semi-finals again, this time to a Castile/Madrid XI, losing 1-2 with Herminio being the author of Andalusia's consolation goal.
