= Luís Correa (footballer) =

Spanish footballer

Personal information
- Full name: Luís Correa
- Date of birth: unknown
- Place of birth: Vigo, Galicia, Spain
- Date of death: Unknown
- Position: Forward

Senior career*
Years	Team	Apps	(Gls)
–1921	Rápido de Bouzas		
1921–1923	Racing de Ferrol		
1923–1923	Fortuna de Vigo		
1923–1925	Celta de Vigo		

International career
1922–1923	Galicia	1	(2)
- * Club domestic league appearances and goals

Luís Correa was a Spanish footballer who played as a forward. He was part of the first-ever team fielded by Celta de Vigo in 1923. The dates of his birth and death are unknown.

== Club career ==
Born in Vigo, he began his career at his hometown club Rápido de Bouzas. He then played for Racing de Ferrol in 1921/22 and 1922/23, before signing for Fortuna de Vigo, a club that in 1923 merged with Real Vigo Sporting in 1923, to form Celta de Vigo. Correa played in the last match that was held between these two rivals on 11 March 1923, which the fortunistas lost 0–1. The presentation match of Celta de Vigo was held at Coia on 16 September 1923, in a meeting between an A and a B team formed with the players from the club, taking advantage of the large team available that they had, and Correa was one of the 11 footballers that lined-up for the A team. On 10 April 1924, he played a friendly match for Celta against the Uruguay national team that would go on to win the 1924 Summer Olympics in Paris. He won three back-to-back Galician Championships with Celta in 1923-24, 1924-25 and 1925-26 before retiring at the end of that same season.

== International career ==
Like many other Celta players of that time, he played for the Galicia national team, netting 2 goals in his debut, which was a friendly against a Pontevedra XI on 28 January 1923.

== Honours ==
=== Club ===
Celta de Vigo

Galician Championship:

- Winners (2) 1923-24, 1924-25 and 1925-26
