= Gabriel Correa =

Gabriel Correa may refer to:

- Gabriel Correa (footballer)
- Gabriel Correa (model)
