= 1922–23 Prince of Asturias Cup =

Tournament details
- Dates: 12 November 1922 – 25 February 1923
- Teams: 8 (from 1 confederation)

Final positions
- Champions: Asturias (1st title)
- Runners-up: Galicia

Tournament statistics
- Matches played: 8
- Goals scored: 28 (3.5 per match)
- Top scorer(s): (Spain) José Luis Zabala (5 goals)

The 1922–23 Prince of Asturias Cup was the fifth tournament of the Prince of Asturias Cup, which is an inter-regional football competition contested by the regional selections of Spain.

The pre-favourites to win were the Catalan team because at that time they had great international figures such as the Spanish goalkeeper Ricardo Zamora or the Barcelona players Josep Samitier, the Filipino Paulino Alcántara and the Argentine Emili Sagi-Barba, but instead, they were knocked out in the semi-finals by the eventual champions Asturias, who defeated Galicia in the final 3–1, courtesy of a second-half brace from José Luis Zabala.

== Squads ==
Eight regional federations participated in this new edition: Asturias, Biscay, Catalonia, Centro, Gipuzkoa, Galicia, South and Levante.

== Format ==
The 1922–23 Prince of Asturias Cup was played in a knock-out cup format, with the 8 teams having to play each other in four quarter-finals, two semi-finals and one final. This tournament was the first in the competition's history to have knock-out stages.

== Summary ==
The competition began on 12 November 1922, with the representative teams of Asturias and Biscay facing off at the Molinón ground in a quarter-final match that ended in a one-goal tie, which forced them to play it again two days later at the same venue and with the same final result of 1–1, with a goal from each team's star man, Asturias' Zabala and Biscay's Travieso, the difference is that Zabala went on to seal a brace with a goal in extra-time, but the Biscayan team managed to find an equalizer in the 111st minute thanks to Domingo Acedo, which forced another period of extra-time where again both teams scored, Barril netted for Asturias just for Biscay to equalize for the third time via a penalty converted by Careaga, but just when it seemed that another replay would be necessary to decide the winner, Barril scored again with 6 minutes to go, and thus, after two extra-times of 30 minutes each, the two sides were finally separated as Asturians ended up winning by a score of 4 to 3. On the 19th of that same month, the other three quarter-final matches were played, and none of them needed a replay to be decided. On the Amute, Catalonia eliminated Gipuzkoa, beating them 3–0, with goals from Samitier, Gràcia and Martí, but the highlight of the match was the refusal of goalkeeper Agustín Eizaguirre (a member of the Spanish team that won the silver medal at the 1920 Summer Olympics) to defend the goal of the Basques, thus earning a sanction of three months of inactivity imposed on him by his team, Real Sociedad. In Coia, the Galician team, who were playing the first game of their history, produced one of the competition's most unexpected results by beating the two-time champions Centro team 4–1, with the Galician goals coming from Chiarroni, Pinilla, Ramón Polo Pardo and Ramón González. And last but not least, in the Valencian field of Algirós, in the midst of enormous expectation, the South Team, made up entirely of Sevilla FC players, qualified for the semifinals after defeating the Valencian team 2–1, with Kinké and León scoring the Andalusian goals while Cubells scored the local's first goal in the team's history.

The semi-finals were played two months later, on 14 January 1923, with Asturias winning over Catalonia thanks to a solitary goal from Zabala in the last minutes; and in the other tie, played at the field of Reina Victoria in Seville, the Galician team kept breaking the expectations, and after beating the Centro team 4–1 in the quarter-finals, they now defeated the South team 4–1 in the semi-finals, with Chiarroni, Polo and González(2) netting for the Galicians once again.

The final was thus decided between Galicia and Asturias, which was played on 25 February at Coia, in the midst of a great atmosphere and in front of a large audience. As soon as they started, Balbino put the Galician team ahead, setting up the perfect scenario for yet another upset, but the Asturias fought back and found an equalizer thanks to Meana, and after the break Zabala sentenced the game with two goals (despite playing with 10-men due to Corsino's expulsion), thus handing the title to Asturias for the first time. Because of his two goals in the final, Zabala was crowned the top goal scorer of the tournament with 5 goals, two in the quarter-finals, one in the semi-finals and two in the final.

=== Results ===
Quarter-finals
12 November 1922
Asturias	1(4)
Biscay	1(3)
19 November 1922
Gipuzkoa	0
Catalonia	3
19 November 1922
Galicia	4
Centro	1
19 November 1922
Valencian Community	1
Andalusia	2

Semi-finals
14 January 1923
Asturias	1
Catalonia	0
14 January 1923
Andalusia	1
Galicia	4

Final
25 February 1923
Asturias	3
Galicia	1

=== Quarter-finals ===
12 November 1922

Asturias	1–1 (a.e.t.)	Biscay
Arcadio 38'	Report	Larraza 25'

El Molinón, Gijón
Referee: (Basque Country (autonomous community)) Murguía

Note: Some sources list José Arruza as the goalscorer of Asturias goal.

19 November 1922

Gipuzkoa	0–3	Catalonia
	Report	Samitier 19'; Gràcia 37'; Martí 80'

Estadio de Amute, Irun
Attendance: 6,000
Referee: (Community of Madrid) Eulogio Aranguren

Note: Some sources list Vicente Piera as the goalscorer of Catalonia's third goal.

19 November 1922

Galicia	4–1	Centro
Chiarroni 5'; Polo 55'; Pinilla 70' (pen.); González 80'	Report1; Report2	Monjardín 15'

Coia, Vigo
Referee: (Portugal) Ivo Lemes

19 November 1922

(Note: the Levante (Valencian Federation) team.) Valencian Community	1–2	(Andalusia) South
Cubells	Report1; Report2	Kinké; León

Campo de Algirós, Valencia
Referee: (Catalonia) Enrique Peris

Note: Some sources list Gabriel as the goalscorer of Andalusia's first goal.

=== Replay ===
13 November 1922

Asturias	4–3 (a.e.t.)	Biscay
Zabala 30', 95'; Barril 125', 144'	Report	Travieso 33'; Acedo 111'; Careaga 132' (pen.)

El Molinón, Gijón
Referee: (Basque Country (autonomous community)) Murguía

After the end of normal time (1–1), one hour of extra time was played.

=== Semi-finals ===
14 January 1923

South (Andalusia)	1–4	Galicia
Kinké	Report	González; Polo; Chiarroni

Reina Victoria, Seville
Referee: (Community of Madrid) Ezequiel Montero

14 January 1923

Asturias	1–0	Catalonia
Zabala 90'	Report

El Molinón, Gijón
Attendance: 6,000
Referee: (Basque Country (autonomous community)) Torra

=== Final ===
Note: Some sources list Zabala as the goalscorer of all three goals of Asturias, and Ramón Polo as the goalscorer of Galicia's goal.

25 February 1923

Galicia	1–3	Asturias
Balbino 4'	Report	Meana 39'; Corsino (red card) 50'; Zabala ?', 83'

Coia, Vigo
Referee: (Basque Country (autonomous community)) Leclerc

Asturias line-up: Óscar; German, Comas, Bango; Meana, Corsino, Amán, Bolado; Zabala, Barril and Argüelles.

On the Galician side they played: Isidro; Otero, Pasarín; Queralt, Torres, Hermida; Reigosa, Balbino, Chiarroni, Polo and Pinilla.

== Winner ==
1922–23 Prince of Asturias Cup winner

Asturias
First title

== Statistics ==
=== Top Scorers ===
Rank	Player	Team	Goals	Stage
1	José Luis Zabala	Asturias	5	Quarter-final (2), semi-final (1) and Final (2)
2	Ramón González	Galicia	3	Quarter-final (1) and semi-final (2)
3	Ramón Polo Pardo	Galicia	2	Quarter-final (1) and semi-final (1)
3	José Chiarroni	Galicia	2	Quarter-final (1) and semi-final (1)
3	Rogelio Barril	Asturias	2	Quarter-final (2)
3	Kinké	(Andalusia) South	2	Quarter-final (1) and semi-final (1)

== Aftermath ==
Despite the defeat, Galicia fans were very pleased with the team's performance in the competition. So much so that at the end of the season they welcomed with tremendous enthusiasm the idea proposed by Manuel de Castro, the critic who popularized the pseudonym of Handicap, to merge the two rival entities, Vigo and Fortuna, to achieve a powerful team that could successfully compete against the powerful Spanish teams such as Catalonia and Asturias, and hence, on 23 August 1923, Celta de Vigo was born.
