= Juan Monjardín =

Spanish footballer

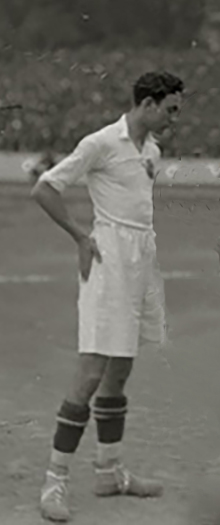

Personal information
- Full name: Juan Monjardín Callejón
- Date of birth: 24 April 1903
- Place of birth: A Coruña, Spain
- Date of death: 13 November 1950 (aged 47)
- Position: Forward

Senior career*
Years	Team	Apps	(Gls)
1918–1929	Madrid FC	74	(55)

International career
1922–1927	Madrid		
1923–1924	Spain	4	(3)
- * Club domestic league appearances and goals

Juan Monjardín Callejón (24 April 1903 – 13 November 1950) was a Spanish footballer who played as a striker. He played for Real Madrid and earned 4 caps for the Spain national football team, competing at the 1924 Summer Olympics.

A historical member of Real Madrid in the pre-war period, he was the first footballer to play for Madrid for his entire career, and thus be part of the so-called one-club men group.

== Club career ==
Born in A Coruña, he was transferred to Madrid as a young man, and began practicing football at the Nuestra Señora del Pilar school, which once was one of the city's football cradles, and from there he entered the training categories of Real Madrid at the end of the 1918-19 season. In that same season, and despite his early age of just 15, he debuted with the first team in a Central Regional Championship match against Racing de Madrid, and he quickly became one of the club's benchmarks at the time. He soon evolved from his position of midfielder to forward, which he no longer gave up until the end of his career.

Between the aforementioned Regional Championship and the Copa del Rey, he accumulated a total of 55 goals in 74 games. At the time of his retirement in 1929 (aged 26), he was the second top scorer of the Madrid team, only surpassed by the 68 goals from teammate Santiago Bernabéu. One of the reasons for his early retirement was the arrival of two players who ended up also being attacking and historical references of the club, the Valencian Gaspar Rubio and Jaime Lazcano from Navarra, both younger than him, and both ended up breaking his goalscoring record at the club. The same season of his retirement La Liga was inaugurated, and by playing only one game, which was also the only one he played that season, he became one of the 19 club players to appear in that historic first edition.

In 1943, years after his professional retirement, the white club organized a tribute match in his honour between the people of Madrid and Barcelona, ending with a one-goal tie.

== International career ==
Being an Madrid FC player, he was eligible to play for the 'Centro' (Madrid area) representative team, and he was part of the squad that participated in two tournaments of the Prince of Asturias Cup, an inter-regional competition, in 1922–23 and 1923–24, and although the first campaign ended with a shocking quarter-final exit at the hands of Galicia, in which Monjardin scored Madrid's consolation goal in a 1–4 loss, the second campaign was much better, largely thanks to Monjardin as he scored twice in their 2–1 win over a Andalusia XI in the semi-finals, followed by what appeared to have been an extra-time winner against Catalonia in the final to seal Madrid's second Prince of Asturias Cup title, but a last-minute equaliser from Emili Sagi-Barba forced a replay in which he scored again, netting twice in the first-half, but his efforts were in vain as Catalonia took the title with a 3–2 win. The silver lining being that with five goals, he was the top goal scorer of the 1923–24 Prince of Asturias Cup, and with a total of six goals in the competition, he is the joint all-time top goalscorer of the Prince of Asturias Cup along with José Luis Zabala and Kinké.

He made his debut for the Spain national team in Lisbon on 17 December 1922 against Portugal, scoring the winning goal of a 2-1 win in the 82nd minute. In his next cap against France on 28 January 1923, he scored a brace in a 3-0 win, and coincidentally, the author of the third goal was Zabala. In total, he was capped four times, scoring three goals.

=== International goals ===
==== Goals for Spain ====
Spain score listed first, score column indicates score after each Zabala goal.

List of international goals scored by Juan Monjardín
No.	Date	Venue	Opponent	Score	Result	Competition
2	17 December 1922	Estádio do Lumiar, Lisbon, Portugal	Portugal	2–1	2–1	Friendly
1	28 January 1923	Atotxa Stadium, San Sebastián, Spain	France	1–0	3–0	Friendly
3	28 January 1923	Atotxa Stadium, San Sebastián, Spain	France	3–0	3–0	Friendly

==== Goals for Madrid ====
Madrid score listed first, score column indicates score after each Monjardín goal.

List of international goals scored by Juan Monjardín
No.	Date	Venue	Opponent	Score	Result	Competition
4	19 November 1922	Coia, Vigo, Spain	Galicia		1–4	1922-23 Prince of Asturias Cup quarter-finals
2	11 November 1922	Estadio Metropolitano, Madrid, Spain	(Andalusia) South	1–0	2–1	1923-24 Prince of Asturias Cup semi-finals
3	11 November 1922	Estadio Metropolitano, Madrid, Spain	(Andalusia) South	2–0	2–1	1923-24 Prince of Asturias Cup semi-finals
4	24 February 1924	San Mamés, Bilbao, Spain	Catalonia	4–3	4-4	1924 Prince of Asturias Cup Final
5	26 February 1924	San Mamés, Bilbao, Spain	Catalonia	1–1	2–3	1924 Prince of Asturias Cup Final Replay
6	26 February 1924	San Mamés, Bilbao, Spain	Catalonia	2–1	2–3	1924 Prince of Asturias Cup Final Replay

== Honours ==
=== Club ===
Madrid FC

Centro Regional Championship:

- Winners (6) 1919–20, 1921–22, 1922–23, 1923–24, 1925–26 and 1926–27

=== International ===
Madrid

Prince of Asturias Cup:

- Runner-up (1): 1923–24

=== Individual ===
Madrid

- Top goalscorer of the 1923–24 Prince of Asturias Cup with 5 goals

=== Records ===
- All-time top goal scorer of the Prince of Asturias Cup with 6 goals

== Death ==
Monjardín died in a car accident on 13 November 1950.
