= Manuel Meana =

Spanish footballer

Personal information
- Full name: Manuel Meana Vallina
- Date of birth: 21 October 1901
- Place of birth: Gijón, Spain
- Date of death: 1 August 1985 (aged 83)

Senior career*
Years	Team	Apps	(Gls)
1917–1927	Sporting de Gijón		

International career
1918	Cantabric	2	(0)
1921–1924	Spain	7	(1)
1922–1925	Asturias	+5	(1)
Medal record
Prince of Asturias Cup
Cantabria
Silver medal – second place	1918 Prince of Asturias Cup	Team
Asturias
Gold medal – first place	1922–23 Prince of Asturias Cup	Team
- * Club domestic league appearances and goals

Manuel Meana (21 October 1901 – 1 August 1985) was a Spanish footballer. He was capped for Spain 7 times and was part of Spain's squad for the football tournament at the 1924 Summer Olympics, but he did not play in any matches. Under the presidency of Santiago Bernabéu he was the creator and first director of the Real Madrid Sports City, a position he held until his retirement.

== Club career ==
Born in Gijón, Meana began to play football in his hometown club, Sporting de Gijón, making his debut at El Molinón on 2 September 1917 against RCD Espanyol.

== International career ==
In May 1918, he was summoned to play for the Cantabric national team, a side consisting of players from the provinces of Asturias and Cantabria, being a member of the team that participated in the 1918 Prince of Asturias Cup, an inter-regional competition organized by the RFEF.

He made his international debut on 9 October 1921 (aged 19) in a friendly match against Belgium that ended in a 2–0 win. He played in seven matches for the Spain national football team from 1921 to 1924, and scored just once, netting the first-ever goal in the Iberian derby when he scored the opening goal of a 3–1 win over Portugal on 18 December 1921, which is also the first-ever goal that Portugal ever conceded.

Being Sporting de Gijón player, he was eligible to play for the Asturias national team, and he was part of the team that reached the final of the 1922-23 Prince of Asturias Cup, an inter-regional competition organized by the RFEF. In the final against Galicia, they fell 0-1 behind early in the match, and it was Meana who equalized still in the first-half, which paved the way for José Luis Zabala to score a second-half brace to seal the title with a 3–1 win. This was his only goal for Asturias, but its also the most important in the team's history.

== Managerial career ==
In 1928, despite still being a player, he trained Sporting de Gijón, and he managed to lead them to the semifinals of the Copa del Rey. He repeated his stay on the Gijón bench in two other stages: 1939-40 and 1948-49.

== International goals ==
=== Goals for Spain ===
Spain score listed first, score column indicates score after each Meana goal.

List of international goals scored by Manuel Meana
No.	Date	Venue	Opponent	Score	Result	Competition
1	18 December 1921	Campo de O'Donnell, Madrid, Spain	Portugal	1–0	3–1	Friendly

=== Goals for Asturias ===
Asturias score listed first, score column indicates score after each Meana goal.

List of international goals scored by Manuel Meana
No.	Date	Venue	Opponent	Score	Result	Competition
1	25 February 1923	Coia, Vigo, Spain	Galicia	1-1	3–1	1922-23 Prince of Asturias Cup Final

== Honours ==
=== International ===
Cantabric

- Prince of Asturias Cup:
  - Runner-up (1): 1918

Asturias

Prince of Asturias Cup:

- Champions (1): 1922–23
