= Manuel Argüelles =

Manuel Argüelles may refer to:

- Manuel Argüelles (footballer) (1897–1958), Spanish footballer
- Manuel Argüelles Argüelles (1875–1945), Spanish politician and lawyer
