= Biscay autonomous football team =

National football team representing Biscay

Biscay
- Association: Basque Football Federation

First international
- Biscay 2–1 Gipuzkoa (Bilbao; 13 December 1914); Biscay 2–2 Andalusia (Madrid; 26 October 1963)

Biggest win
- Biscay 4–2 Asturias (Bilbao; 18 November 1923)

Biggest defeat
- Gipuzkoa 4–0 Biscay (San Sebastián; 6 January 1915)

The Biscay autonomous football team was the regional football team for the province of Biscay, Spain, active between the 1910s and the 1930s. They were never affiliated with FIFA or UEFA, because Biscay is represented internationally by the Spain national football team.

== History ==
In the first half of the 20th century, the provincial federation selected a representative team for friendly matches, and also took part in two editions of the inter-regional Prince of Asturias Cup, the first of which in 1922-23 ending in a quarter-final exit at the hands of Asturias after a dramatic 4–3 loss in the replay (the original game ended 1-1), but they managed to exact revenge in the following tournament when they faced Asturias in the quarter-finals again, this time winning 4–2 with goals from Carmelo, Laca and Travieso, but in the semi-finals, they were knocked-out by eventual champions Catalonia 0–1. Prior to the split between Gipuzkoa and Biscay, their players also formed a combined 'North' team (nominally including Cantabria, but dominated by Basque players) which evolved into the Basque Country team.

In 2013, the Biscay Federation (which continues to operate provincial football leagues at the sixth level of the pyramid and below) celebrated its centenary, taking the foundation date as that of the North Federation. A commemorative match was staged between the amateur teams of Biscay and Gipuzkoa (1–1 draw, won by Biscay on penalties), as had also taken place in 1964 for the 50th anniversary (6–0 to Biscay).

The Biscay professional selection had reformed for the Castilian Federation's 'golden jubilee' in 1963, playing Andalusia, and in June 2013 they did so again to face Athletic Bilbao, celebrating the 100th anniversary of both the federation's foundation and the opening of San Mamés stadium, as well as being its last match before demolition. It was an event of familiarity for the participants, with many of the Biscay players having close ties to Athletic, and many of the club's current players originating from the province. Despite being unable to include the opposition's employees in their squad, Biscay won the fixture 1–0 (Athletic introduced several retired players for cameo appearances in the later stages).

== Results ==
13 December 1914 Friendly	Biscay	2–1	Gipuzkoa	Bilbao, Basque Country
	Barturen; Pagaza	Report	Patricio	Stadium: San Mamés; Referee: Angoso

6 January 1915 Friendly	Gipuzkoa	4–0	Biscay	San Sebastián, Gipuzkoa
				Stadium: Atotxa Stadium

31 January 1920 Friendly	Catalonia	2–1	Biscay	Barcelona, Catalonia
	Coca; Domènech	Report	Carmelo	Stadium: Camp Muntaner; Referee: Francisco Torrents

1 February 1920 Friendly	Catalonia	3–1	Biscay	Barcelona, Catalonia
	Domènech; Martínez	Report	Carmelo	Stadium: Camp de la Indústria

12 November 1922 1922–23 Prince of Asturias Cup quarter-finals	Asturias	1–1	Biscay	Gijón, Asturias
	Arcadio 38'	Report	Larraza 25'	Stadium: El Molinón; Referee: (Basque Country (autonomous community)) Murguía

13 November 1922 1922–23 Prince of Asturias Cup quarter-finals replay	Asturias	4–3 (a.e.t.)	Biscay	Gijón, Asturias
	Zabala 30', 95'; Barril 125', 144'	Report	Travieso 33'; Acedo 111'; Careaga 132' (pen.)	Stadium: El Molinón; Referee: (Basque Country (autonomous community)) Murguía
Note: After the end of normal time (1–1), one hour of extra-time was played.

18 November 1923 1923–24 Prince of Asturias Cup quarter-finals	Biscay	4–2	Asturias	Bilbao, Basque Country
	Carmelo; Laca; Travieso	Report	Bolado; Zabala	Stadium: San Mamés; Referee: (Community of Madrid) Contreras

27 January 1924 1923–24 Prince of Asturias Cup; Semi-final	Catalonia	1–0	Biscay	Barcelona, Catalonia
	Martí 13'	Report1; Report2		Stadium: Camp de Les Corts; Referee: (Community of Madrid) Contreras

17 March 1929 Friendly	Biscay	4–3	Gipuzkoa	Getxo, Basque Country
		Report		Stadium: Jolaseta Stadium; Referee: (Basque Country (autonomous community)) Pelayo Serrano

28 February 1937 Friendly	Biscay	1–2	Gipuzkoa	Bilbao, Basque Country
		Report^{[usurped]}		Stadium: San Mamés

26 October 1963 FFM Trofeo Bodas de Oro	Biscay	2–2 (a.e.t.)	Andalusia	Madrid
	Mauri 11'; Aguirre 89'	Report	Diéguez 10'; Ansola 44'	Stadium: Estadio Metropolitano; Attendance: 20,000; Referee: Plaza
Note: Corner kicks were counted but also even at 9 each. Andalusia progressed on drawing of lots.

=== Table ===
Opponent	Pld	W	D	L	GF	GA	GD	Win %
Andalusia	1	0	1	0	2	2	+0	0.00
Asturias	3	1	1	1	8	7	+1	33.33
Catalonia	3	0	0	3	2	6	−4	0.00
Gipuzkoa	4	2	0	2	7	10	−3	50.00
Total (4 opponents)	11	3	2	6	19	25	−6	27.27

== Notable players ==
- Carmelo Goyenechea
- Travieso

== See also ==
- Category:Footballers from Biscay
