= Rogelio Tapia =

Spanish footballer (1903–1986)

Rogelio
Personal information
- Full name: Rogelio Tapia Costa
- Date of birth: 10 July 1903
- Place of birth: Lavadores, Galicia
- Date of death: 10 January 1986 (aged 82)
- Position: Forward

Senior career*
Years	Team	Apps	(Gls)
- Celta Vigo
- * Club domestic league appearances and goals

Rogelio Tapia Costa (10 July 1903 – 10 January 1986) was a Spanish footballer who played as a forward. He is the fourth top scorer of Celta de Vigo, with 119 goals, a number only surpassed by Iago Aspas, Moncho Polo and Manuel Copena "Nolete". Rogelio had played for the Real Club Fortuna de Vigo since childhood, appearing in the Vigo club's lineup in 1925. He would later go on to be crowned champion with the Galician club, Balaídos.

Rogelio holds the record for scoring the most goals in a single game, netting eight goals on 17 January 1926 in a 15–0 victory over Sporting Union.

Rogelio played with Celta for seven seasons. During those seasons Celta amassed 582 goals, 119 of which were scored by Rogelio.

Rogelio starred in a friendly match with the Galician team who played in Estadio Riazor on 28 July 1929 against the Center of Spain team. The match ended up tied 0-0, as Rogelio was not able to score.

Rogelio's best year was his 1926–27 campaign, in which he scored 36 goals in 23 matches. He scored 119 goals in 113 official matches with Celta, averaging 1.05 goals per match. He left Real Club Celta in 1932, but still played one season in Union Sporting C. de Lavadores. The record lives on in Celta's history with the best goal-scoring average of one goal every 85 minutes.
