= Manuel Argüelles (footballer) =

Spanish footballer

Personal information
- Full name: Manuel Argüelles Sánchez
- Date of birth: 9 July 1897
- Place of birth: Gijón, Asturias, Spain
- Date of death: 10 December 1958 (aged 61)
- Place of death: Gijón, Spain
- Position: Forward

Senior career*
Years	Team	Apps	(Gls)
??–1913	Sportiva Gijonesa		
1913–1927	Sporting de Gijón		
1927–1928	Athletic Club de Madrid		

International career
1917	Cantabria	2	(0)
1922-1923	Asturias	2	(1)
- * Club domestic league appearances and goals

Manuel Argüelles Sánchez (9 July 1897-10 December 1958) was a Spanish footballer who played as a forward.

== Club career ==
Born in Gijón, he began to play football at the youth ranks of his hometown club Sportiva Gijonesa, for he played until 1913, when at the age of just 16, he joined Sporting de Gijón, featuring alongside the likes of the Villaverde brothers (Fernando and Senén). After 14 seasons with the club (1913–1927), he left for Athletic Madrid, for which he played just one season before retiring.

== International career ==
Because he was a Real Oviedo player, he was eligible to play for the Cantabric national team, a side consisting of players from the provinces of Asturias and Cantabria, and in 1917, he was summoned by them to represent them at the 1917 Prince of Asturias Cup, an official inter-regional competition organized by the RFEF.

Argüelles was included in the Spain national team for the 1920 Antwerp Olympic Games. However, he requested a voluntary withdrawal in order to return to Asturias. Without him, Spain was eliminated in the quarter-finals by the eventual champions Belgium.

Like many other Real Oviedo players, he was summoned to play for the Asturias national team several times, being one of the eleven footballers that played in the team's first-ever game on 4 June 1922, in a friendly against St Mirren F.C., and even though they lost 3–7, Argüelles was the author of one of the consolation goals. The Regional Asturian team then played seven official games between 1922 and 1926 in the Prince of Asturias Cup, winning the 1922–23 edition after beating Biscay in the quarter-finals, Catalonia in the semi-finals and Galicia 3–1 in the final.

=== Goals for Asturias ===
Asturias score listed first, score column indicates score after each Argüelles goal.

List of international goals scored by Manuel Argüelles
No.	Date	Venue	Opponent	Score	Result	Competition
1	4 June 1922	El Molinón, Gijón, Spain	(Scotland) St Mirren		3–7	Friendly

== Honours ==
=== International ===
Cantabric

- Prince of Asturias Cup:
  - Runner-up (1): 1918

Asturias

- Prince of Asturias Cup:
  - Champions (1): 1922–23 Prince of Asturias Cup
