= Real Vigo Sporting =

Spanish football club

- Real Vigo Sporting Club crest, 1914
- Full name: Real Vigo Sporting Club
- Nickname: Os Viguistas
- Founded: 1905 (as Vigo F.C.)
- Dissolved: 1923
- Ground: Campo de Coia
Home colours

Real Vigo Sporting Club, was a Spanish football club based in Vigo, Galicia, founded in 1905.

== Background ==
Vigo was one of the cities through which football entered the Iberian Peninsula, thanks to British sailors and workers. The first demonstrations of the sport were made by the team of the British company Electric Telegraph Company, which was installing the telegraph cable between the islands and Vigo, to connect with Lisbon from there. This team was called the Exiles Football Club and played several matches against British merchant and military crews passing through the Port of Vigo. The first mixed teams between Galicians and the British were soon created, such as Petit FC, who in 1905 beat the Exiles for the first time.

== History ==
Following the example of Barcelona, where FC Barcelona and Català FC had been founded in 1899, Vigo came up with their own clubs in 1905, the Fortuna Football Club and the Vigo Football Club, and ever since their birth, there has been a great rivalry between the two.

The club's greatest achievement was reaching the 1908 Copa del Rey Final (still as Vigo FC), which they lost 1-2 to Madrid. Sporting was crowned champion of the Galician Championship eight times in 1908, 1909, 1914, 1917, 1918, 1919, 1920 and 1923.

Historic players of the club include the Yarza brothers (Joaquín and Manuel), who were crowned champions of Spain with Madrid, and Moncho Gil and Otero, who represented Spain at the 1920 Olympic Games in Antwerp.

In order to create a powerful team that could successfully compete against the likes of Barcelona and Madrid, Sporting merged with their great rivals, Fortuna, to give birth to Real Club Celta de Vigo in 1923. The last match between these two rivals was held on 11 March 1923, which the viguistas won to claim the 1922–23 Galician championship. Ramón González was the hero of the match as he scored the only goal of the game in a 1–0 win.

Real Vigo Sporting: Isidro; Otero, Pérez; Queralt, Hermida, Vázquez; Gerardo, R. González, Chiarroni, Tito and Pinilla

Real Fortuna: Lilo; Juanito, Pasarín; Balbino, Torres, Córdoba; Reigosa, Rodríguez, Chicha, Correa and Salvador.

=== Club names ===
- Vigo F.C. (1905–1913)
  - Merged with New F.C. (1906)
  - Merged with Español F.C. (1910)
  - Merged with Sporting Club (1913)
- Vigo Sporting Club (1913–1914)
- Real Vigo Sporting Club (1914–1923)

== Honours ==
=== Regional ===
- Campionato Galego (unofficial)
  - Winners (2): 1906–07, 1907–08
- Campionato Galego
  - Winners (5): 1913–14, 1916–17, 1918–19, 1919–20, 1922–23

=== Domestic ===
- Copa del Rey
  - Runners-up (1): 1908

== Notes ==
1. Unofficial. These titles were not ratified by the Royal Spanish Football Federation
2. Official
