= Juan Armet =

Spanish footballer and coach (1895–1956)

Personal information
- Full name: Juan Armet de Castellví
- Date of birth: 30 June 1895
- Place of birth: Terrassa, Spain
- Date of death: 5 October 1956 (aged 61)
- Place of death: Madrid, Spain
- Position: Striker

Senior career*
Years	Team	Apps	(Gls)
1911–1916	Universitary		
1916–1917	Espanyol		
1917–1927	Sevilla		

International career
1916–1917	Catalonia	6	(0)
1922–1928	Andalusia	6	(3)

Managerial career
- 1921–1922: Valencia
- 1927–1930: Real Betis
- 1940–1941: Real Murcia
- 1941–1943: Real Madrid
- Olímpica Jienense
- 1942–1943: CE Sabadell FC
- * Club domestic league appearances and goals

Juan Armet de Castellví, nicknamed "Kinké" (30 June 1895 in Terrassa – 5 October 1956 in Madrid) was a Spanish footballer who played as a forward, and later a coach.

== Club career ==
Born in Terrassa, Catalonia, Kinké began to play football in 1911 with Universitary SC, featuring alongside the likes of Ricardo Zamora. After 5 seasons with the club, he joined Espanyol in 1916, with whom he played for one year. At the end of the season, he was transferred to Sevilla, with whom he played for the next ten seasons, retiring as a footballer in 1927 at the age of thirty-two.

== International career ==
While a Espanyol player, he was eligible to play for the Catalonia national team, and in May 1916, he was part of the Catalan team that won the second edition of the Prince of Asturias Cup in 1916, an inter-regional competition organized by the RFEF. In the decisive game against a Castile/Madrid XI, Kinké scored two goals in an 2-2 draw that was enough for the Catalans to win the cup for the first time.

When he joined Sevilla, he become eligible to play for the Andalusia national team, being in the line-up of the team's first-ever international match on 19 November 1922 against a Valencia XI, which was held at the Campo de Algirós as the quarter-finals of the 1922-23 Prince of Asturias Cup, and they won 2-1 with Kinké being the author of the first goal in the team's history. But in the semi-finals, they were knocked out by Galicia after a 1-4 loss, with Kinké scoring the consolation goal. In the following campaign, Andalusia beat the Valencians in the quarter-finals again with Kinké scoring once in a 3-2 win, but then they were once again eliminated in the semi-finals, this time by the Castile/Madrid XI. Kinké is the all-time top goal scorer of the prince of Asturias Cup along with José Luis Zabala and Juan Monjardín, who also scored 6 goals in the competition.

== Managerial career ==
Armet was the manager of Real Madrid since 1941 until September 1943. He also coached Real Betis, Real Murcia, Olímpica Jienense and CE Sabadell FC.

== Honours ==
=== International ===
Catalonia

Prince of Asturias Cup:

- Champions (1): 1916

=== Records ===
- All-time top goal scorer of the Prince of Asturias Cup with 6 goals.
