= Madrid autonomous football team =

Regional association football team

Madrid
- Association: Madrid Football Federation
- Head coach: Lorenzo Benito
- Top scorer: Juan Monjardín (6)

First international
- as Castile; Castile 1–2 Catalonia (Madrid, Madrid; 10 May 1915) as Madrid; Madrid 1–2 Andalusia (Madrid, Madrid; 7 June 2013)

Biggest win
- Castile 4–0 Catalonia (Madrid, Madrid; 27 October 1927); Castile 4–0 Andalusia (Madrid, Madrid; 28 October 1963)

Biggest defeat
- Castile 0–4 Catalonia (Madrid, Madrid; 6 January 1916); Castile 1–5 Catalonia (Madrid, Madrid; 13 October 1943)

The Madrid autonomous football team is the regional football team for the Community of Madrid, Spain. They are not affiliated with FIFA or UEFA, because the Community of Madrid is represented internationally by the Spain national football team. The team plays only friendly matches.

== History ==
=== Prince of Asturias Cup ===
In the first half of the 20th century, the Regional Centro Football Federation (which encompassed Madrid and the wider Castile region, and organised the Campeonato Regional Centro for the local clubs) selected a representative team for friendly matches, and also participated in the inter-regional Prince of Asturias Cup, winning the competition on two occasions (1917 and 1918) when they were hosts. Due to incompetence of some federative leaders, the calendar of the 1917 tournament was allowed to be played on the same week as the 1917 Copa del Rey Final between Madrid FC and Arenas, something that prevented the Centro team from having the best players of Madrid FC, thus they had to send players from the likes of Athletic Madrid and Racing de Madrid to form a team which could compete. As a result, this side included lesser known players such as Joaquín Pascual, Ezequiel Montero, Sócrates Quintana, José Agüero, Miguel Mieg and Saturno Villaverde and captain José María Castell, who was the only player of Madrid FC in the squad. Despite being a weaker side than in the previous tournaments, they managed to win the tournament for the first time in the team's history, with the then unknown Saturnino being the star of the tournament with three goals - a brace against Catalonia in a 2-2 draw and the winner against Cantabric in a 3-2 win - while Mieg and Agüero scored the goals of the decisive game against Catalonia. In the 1918 edition, they were set up to face Cantabric in a two-legged final, and Centro won both games by an aggregate score of 6-3, with the Castilian goalscorers being Feliciano Rey, Gomar, José María Sansinenea (2) and Ramón Olalquiaga (2).

They also had a memorable campaign in the 1923–24 Prince of Asturias Cup, where they beat Galicia 1-0 in the quarter-finals just as Galicia had done to them in the quarter-finals of the previous edition, and then defeated the South team 2-1 in the semi-finals thanks to a brace from Juan Monjardín, and in the final against Catalonia Monjardín appeared to have been the hero once more when he scored early at the beginning of extra time to put Madrid 4-3 up, but with two minutes remaining Sagi-Barba leveled the scores at 4-4, forcing a replay in which Monjardín scored twice, but his efforts were in vain as Catalonia ran 3-2 winners.

=== Stagnation ===
The Centro Federation evolved into the Castilian Football Federation in the 1930s, and into the Madrid Federation in the 1980s; both organisations considered themselves to be the successor to Centro, using its 1913 foundation date as the basis for their celebrations of a 50th Anniversary in 1963 and 100th Anniversary in 2013, including special fixtures featuring a regional representative squad.

== Match history ==
=== Results ===
10 May 1915 1915 Prince of Asturias Cup	Castile	1–2	Catalonia	Madrid
	Petit	Report	Alcántara; Baró	Stadium: Campo de O'Donnell; Referee: (Community of Madrid) Julián Ruete

14 May 1915 1915 Prince of Asturias Cup	Castile	1–1	Basque Country (Note: Matches were played as the 'North Federation' (Norte) team, including Cantabria, but usually featuring only players from the Basque provinces of Biscay and Gipuzkoa, each of which also organised their own representative matches occasionally.)	Madrid
	Bernabéu (1-0); Petit (penalty missed)	Report	Patricio (1-1)	Stadium: Campo de O'Donnell; Referee: (Community of Madrid) Carlos Dieste

10 October 1915 Friendly	Catalonia	0–0	Castile	Barcelona, Catalonia
		Report		Stadium: Camp Muntaner; Referee: Hamilton

6 January 1916 Friendly	Castile	0–4	Catalonia	Madrid
		Report		Stadium: Campo de O'Donnell; Referee: Hamilton

11 May 1916 1916 Prince of Asturias Cup	Castile	3–6	Catalonia	Madrid
	Álvarez 15'; Bernabéu 40'; Larrañaga 80' (pen.)	Report; Report2	Cabedo 12', 20', 35', 60'; Sampere 30'; Kinké 50'	Stadium: Campo de O'Donnell; Referee: (Community of Madrid) Carlos Dieste

13 May 1916 1916 Prince of Asturias Cup	Castile	2–2	Catalonia	Madrid
	De Miguel 50'; Larrañaga 70'	Report; Report2	Kinké 75', 80' (pen.)	Stadium: Campo de O'Donnell; Referee: (Community of Madrid) Carlos Dieste

9 May 1917 1917 Prince of Asturias Cup	Castile	2–2	Catalonia	Madrid
	Saturno		Gumbau; Alcover	Stadium: Campo de O'Donnell; Referee: (Community of Madrid) Carlos Dieste

11 May 1917 1917 Prince of Asturias Cup	Castile	3–2	Cantabric (Note: A combined team of players from Asturias and Cantabria.)	Madrid
	Castell 20' (pen.); Agüero 30'; Villaverde 45'	Report	Felgueroso 50'; Pascual 60' (o.g.)	Stadium: Campo de O'Donnell; Referee: (Basque Country (autonomous community)) Pelayo Serrano

15 May 1917 1917 Prince of Asturias Cup Final	Castile	2–0	Catalonia	Madrid
	Mieg 50'; Agüero 60'	Report; Report2		Stadium: Campo de O'Donnell; Referee: (Community of Madrid) Julián Ruete

14 October 1917 Friendly	Catalonia	1–0	Castile	Barcelona, Catalonia
	Monistrol			Stadium: Camp Muntaner; Referee: (Catalonia) Francisco Bru

20 January 1918 1918 Prince of Asturias Cup	Castile	3–2	Cantabric	Madrid
	Sansinenea; Gomar; Rey	Report	Villaverde III; Villaverde I	Stadium: Campo de O'Donnell; Referee: (Basque Country (autonomous community)) Pelayo Serrano

23 January 1918 1918 Prince of Asturias Cup	Castile	3–1	Cantabric	Madrid
	Sansinenea; Olalquiaga	Report; Report2	Villaverde III	Stadium: Campo de O'Donnell; Referee: (Community of Madrid) Carlos Dieste

19 November 1922 1922–23 Prince of Asturias Cup quarter-finals	Galicia	4–1	Castile	Vigo, Galicia
	Chiarroni; Polo; Pinilla (pen.); González	Report	Monjardín	Stadium: Coia; Referee: (Portugal) Ivo Lemes

25 November 1923 1923–24 Prince of Asturias Cup quarter-finals	Castile	1–0	Galicia	Madrid
	De Miguel 10'	Report		Stadium: Ciudad Lineal; Referee: (Catalonia) Agustín Cruella Tena

21 January 1924 1923–24 Prince of Asturias Cup semi-finals	Castile	2–1	Andalusia	Madrid
	Monjardín	Report	Herminio	Stadium: Estadio Metropolitano; Referee: (Catalonia) Josep Llovera

24 February 1924 1924 Prince of Asturias Cup Final	Catalonia	4–4	Castile	Bilbao, Basque Country
	Samitier 35', 38'; Piera 57'; Sagibarba 118'	Report; Report2	Pérez 8'; Piera 42', 75'; Monjardín 95'	Stadium: San Mamés; Referee: (Basque Country (autonomous community)) Murguia

26 February 1924 1924 Prince of Asturias Cup Final Replay	Catalonia	3–2	Castile	Bilbao, Basque Country
	Carulla (0–1); Samitier (2–2); Piera (2–3)	Report; Report2	Monjardín (1–1)	Stadium: San Mamés; Referee: (Cantabria) Fermín Sánchez

15 May 1927 Friendly	Catalonia	3–0	Castile	Barcelona, Catalonia
	Sastre 8', 11', 88'			Stadium: Camp de Les Corts; Referee: (Catalonia) Agustín Cruella Tena

27 October 1927 Friendly	Castile	4–0	Catalonia	Madrid
				Stadium: Estadio Metropolitano

24 September 1930 Friendly	Catalonia	3–0	Castile	Barcelona, Catalonia
	Ventolrà 24'; Goiburu 57'; Arocha 70'			Stadium: Camp de Les Corts

8 June 1930 Friendly	Castile	1–4	Galicia	Madrid
			Losada; Fariña; Hilario	Stadium: Chamartín

6 January 1931 Friendly	Castile	1–1	Catalonia	Madrid
	Marín	Report	Sagibarba	Stadium: Estadio Chamartín

14 April 1932 Friendly	Catalonia	1–1	Castile	Barcelona, Catalonia
	Samitier		Losada	Stadium: Estadi d'Montjuïc

16 March 1941 Friendly	Castile	4–3	Catalonia	Madrid
	Pruden; Barinaga		Martínez	Stadium: Estadio Chamartín

15 March 1942 Friendly	Catalonia	4–3	Castile	Barcelona, Catalonia
	Gràcia; Mas unknown Martín			Stadium: Camp de Les Corts; Referee: A. Vilalta

13 October 1943 Friendly	Castile	1–5	Catalonia	Madrid
	Alonso		César; Martín; Escolà; Bravo	Stadium: Estadio Chamartín

23 June 1946 Friendly	Catalonia	5–2	Castile	Barcelona, Catalonia
	Calvo; Sospedra; Pallàs; Mencia (o.g.)		Pruden; Juncosa	Stadium: Camp de Les Corts

28 October 1963 FFM Trofeo Bodas de Oro	Castile	4–0	Andalusia	Madrid
	Mendonça 3'; Puskás 77' (pen.) 87'; Yanko 86'	Report	Donato (red card)	Stadium: Santiago Bernabéu Stadium; Attendance: 40,000; Referee: Barrenechea

19 May 1990 Friendly	Madrid (Community of Madrid)	0–1	Brazil	Madrid
		Report	Branco	Stadium: Vicente Calderón; Referee: J. M. Garcia Aranda

7 June 2013 Friendly	Madrid (Community of Madrid)	1–2	Andalusia	Madrid
20:00 CET	Riki 13' (pen.)	Report	Barral 8', 17'	Stadium: Vallecas; Attendance: 9,000; Referee: Carlos Velasco Carballo

=== Table ===
Opponent	Pld	W	D	L	GF	GA	GD	Win %
Andalusia	3	2	0	1	7	3	+4	66.67
Asturias	3	3	0	0	9	5	+4	100.00
Basque Country	1	0	0	1	0	1	−1	0.00
Brazil	1	0	0	1	0	1	−1	0.00
Catalonia	19	3	6	10	30	48	−18	15.79
Galicia	3	1	0	2	3	8	−5	33.33
Total (6 opponents)	30	9	6	15	49	66	−17	30.00

== Honours ==
Prince of Asturias Cup:

- Champions (2): 1917 and 1918
- Runners-up (2): 1916 and 1924

== Notable players ==
- (Spain) Santiago Bernabéu
- (Spain) René Petit
- (Spain) Juan Monjardín
- (Hungary) (Spain) Ferenc Puskás

== See also ==
- Category:Footballers from the Community of Madrid
