= Antonio Ansola =

Spanish footballer

Personal information
- Full name: Antonio Ansola Arrieta
- Date of birth: 17 January 1931
- Place of birth: Elgoibar, Spain
- Date of death: 2 December 2013 (aged 82)
- Place of death: Elboibar, Spain
- Position: Defender

Senior career*
Years	Team	Apps	(Gls)
1953–1961	Real Sociedad	141	
1961–1962	Elche		
- * Club domestic league appearances and goals

Antonio Ansola Arrieta (17 January 1931 – 2 December 2013) was a Spanish footballer who played as a defender.

He played 141 football games for Real Sociedad mostly during the 1950s. He would end his career at Elche CF, in the 1961–62 season, after which he retired.
