= Gabriel Correa (footballer) =

Uruguayan footballer and manager (born 1968)

Personal information
- Full name: Carlos Gabriel Correa Viana
- Date of birth: 13 January 1968 (age 58)
- Place of birth: Montevideo, Uruguay
- Height: 1.82 m (6 ft 0 in)
- Position: Midfielder

Team information
- Current team: Los Garres (manager)

Senior career*
Years	Team	Apps	(Gls)
1982–1988	River Plate Montevideo		
1989	Peñarol		
1990–1993	Murcia	55	(2)
1993–1994	Valladolid	20	(0)
1994–1998	Mérida	118	(7)
1998–1999	Sevilla	20	(0)
2000–2001	Hércules	9	(0)

International career
1988–1990	Uruguay	19	(2)

Managerial career
- 2005–2006: Murcia (assistant)
- 2006: Murcia
- 2006–2007: Mar Menor
- 2007–2008: Caravaca
- 2008: Lorca Deportiva
- 2010–2011: Córdoba (youth)
- 2011–2013: Murcia (youth)
- 2013–2014: UCAM Murcia
- 2015–2016: Orihuela
- 2016: Torrevieja
- 2021–: Los Garres
- * Club domestic league appearances and goals

Carlos Gabriel Correa Viana (born 13 January 1968) is a Uruguayan retired footballer, and is the manager of Spanish club UD Los Garres.

A defensive midfielder, most of his professional career was spent in Spain where he played for five teams – amassing La Liga totals of 76 matches and four goals and 137/5 in Segunda División – subsequently coaching in its lower leagues.

== Club career ==
Born in the country's capital, Montevideo, Correa played six years with local Club Atlético River Plate, switching to another side in the city in 1989, national powerhouse Peñarol. After just one season he moved abroad, joining Spain's Real Murcia in the country's second division and dropping down to the third level in his second year, due to irregularities.

In the middle of 1993, Correa moved straight into La Liga with Real Valladolid, his competition debut coming on 5 September in a 0–1 home loss against Sporting de Gijón. In the following four years, he would bounce back and forth between divisions one and two with CP Mérida.

Correa signed with Sevilla FC in summer 1998, at the age of 30. In August of the following year he suffered a serious Achilles tendon injury which would put him out of action for more than one year, after which he made a brief comeback with his fifth club in Spain, Hércules CF (third division), retiring shortly after.

In 2005, Correa started his coaching career, first with the youth sides then as assistant to former club Murcia. He coached the team for exactly one match in the 2005–06 season before they appointed Sergije Krešić, with the Uruguayan returning to the youth levels.

For the next three years, Correa managed in the lower leagues of Spain, being fired from Lorca Deportiva CF in mid-October 2008.

== International career ==
Correa made 19 appearances for Uruguay during two years, representing the nation at the 1990 FIFA World Cup (one match) and the 1989 Copa América. His debut came on 2 November 1988 in a friendly against Chile in Concepción, being sent off in the 1–1 draw.

International goals
#	Date	Venue	Opponent	Score	Result	Competition
1.	19 June 1989	Montevideo, Uruguay	Chile	1–1	2–2	Friendly
2.	19 June 1989	Montevideo, Uruguay	Chile	2–2	2–2	Friendly

== Personal life ==
Correa's daughter, Yannel, was also a footballer.
