= Ramón Polo =

Spanish footballer and manager

Personal information
- Full name: Ramón Polo Pardo
- Date of birth: 13 April 1901
- Place of birth: Corcubión, Spain
- Date of death: 19 June 1966 (aged 65)
- Place of death: ?, Spain
- Position: Forward

Youth career
- Deportivo Guardés

Senior career*
Years	Team	Apps	(Gls)
?–1923	Fortuna Vigo		
1923–1935	Celta	207	(119)

International career
1927	Spain B	1	(0)
1925–1933	Spain	2	(0)
1923–1930	Galicia	13	(8)

Managerial career
- 1951–1952: SG Lucense
- * Club domestic league appearances and goals

Ramón Polo Pardo (13 April 1901 – 19 June 1966) was a Spanish footballer who played as an outside forward, and was a former manager.

== Club career ==
Born in Corcubión, Province of A Coruña, Polo played his entire professional career with Celta de Vigo also in his native Galicia, after Real Fortuna Football Club merged with Real Vigo Sporting Club in 1923. He competed with the club in Segunda División and Tercera División, scoring an all-time best 159 goals in 259 games all competitions comprised even though he was not a pure striker.

Having studied in his youth to be a priest, Polo was known in Argentina as the black shadow of Américo Tesoriere, as he was the only European player capable of scoring against him. In a game against Deportivo de La Coruña, he converted a penalty kick with a broken fibula.

Polo retired in 1935 at the age of 34, going on to manage SG Lucense in the second level in the early 50s. He died on 19 June 1966, aged 65.

== International career ==
Polo gained two caps for Spain during seven years, in as many friendlies. His debut took place on 4 October 1925, in a 1–0 win over Hungary in Budapest.
