= Jesús Larraza =

Spanish footballer

Personal information
- Full name: Jesús Larraza Renovales
- Date of birth: 20 July 1903
- Place of birth: Basauri, Spain
- Date of death: 27 May 1926 (aged 22)
- Place of death: Miravalles, Spain

Senior career*
Years	Team	Apps	(Gls)
1922–1926	Athletic Club	45	(14)

International career
1924	Spain	1	(0)
- * Club domestic league appearances and goals

Jesús Larraza Renovales (20 July 1903 – 27 May 1926) was a Spanish footballer. He competed in the men's tournament at the 1924 Summer Olympics.

== Biography ==
He spent his whole career with Athletic Club, a career that only lasted four years, between 1922 and 1926, since he died in a motorcycle accident when he was only 22 years old. Jesús had an accident on 27 May 1926 with his Harley-Davidson along with a friend who also died in the accident when he went off the road. His last match as a footballer dates back to 13 May, when he played a friendly against Real Sociedad (2-1). He earned one cap for Spain on 25 May 1924 against Italy, in a match that ended with Spain's elimination from the 1924 Summer Olympics after losing 0-1; Larraza was sent off in the 55th when the game was still leveled at 0-0.
