= Real Fortuna Football Club =

Spanish football club

Real Fortuna
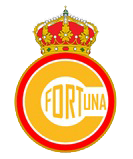
- Team Logo
- Full name: Real Fortuna Football Club
- Nickname: Los Fortunistas
- Founded: 1908 (1905 - as Fortuna FC)
- Dissolved: 1923
- Ground: Campo de Bouzas
Home colours

Real Fortuna Football Club, was a Spanish football club based in Vigo, Galicia, founded in 1905.

== Background ==
Vigo was one of the cities through which football entered the Iberian Peninsula, thanks to British sailors and workers. The first demonstrations of the sport were made by the team of the British company Electric Telegraph Company, which was installing the telegraph cable between the islands and Vigo, to connect with Lisbon from there. This team was called the Exiles Football Club and played several matches against British merchant and military crews passing through the Port of Vigo. The first mixed teams between Galicians and the British were soon created, such as Petit FC, who in 1905 beat the Exiles for the first time.

== History ==
Following the example of Barcelona, where FC Barcelona and Català FC had been founded in 1899, Vigo came up with their own clubs in 1905, the Vigo Football Club and the Fortuna Football Club, and from the cradle, there has been a great rivalry between the two. Fortuna would receive the title of "Real" in 1908, thus finally adopting the name of Real Fortuna Football Club de Vigo. Fortuna won the Galician Championship nine times in 1906, 1907, 1910, 1911, 1912, 1915, 1918, 1921 and 1922.

In order to create a powerful team that could successfully compete against the likes of Barcelona and Madrid, Fortuna merged with their great rivals, now called Real Vigo Sporting Football Club, to give birth to Real Club Celta de Vigo in 1923. The last match between these two rivals was held on 11 March 1923, which the fortunistas lost. Ramón González scored the only goal of the game in a 1–0 loss.

Real Vigo Sporting: Isidro; Otero, Pérez; Queralt, Hermida, Vázquez; Gerardo, R. González, Chiarroni, Tito and Pinilla

Real Fortuna: Lilo; Juanito, Pasarín; Balbino, Torres, Córdoba; Reigosa, Rodríguez, Chicha, Correa and Salvador.

== Honours ==
=== Regional ===
- Campionato Galego (unofficial)
  - Winners (5): 1905–06, 1908–09, 1909–10, 1910–11, 1911–12
- Campionato Galego
  - Winners (3): 1914–15, 1920–21, 1921–22

== Notes ==
1. Unofficial. These titles were not ratified by the Royal Spanish Football Federation
2. Official
