= Royal Galician Football Federation =

Spanish football association

RFEF
- Founded: 1909; 117 years ago
- Headquarters: A Coruña
- FIFA affiliation: No
- Website: www.futgal.es

The Royal Galician Football Federation (Galician: Real Federación Galega de Fútbol, Spanish: Real Federación Gallega de Fútbol; RFGF) is the governing body of the sport of football in Galicia.

The RFGF organises Group 1 of the Tercera Federación, with the assistance of the Royal Spanish Football Federation (RFEF), as part of the Spanish football league system. It also organises the Copa Galiza and regional divisions of Galicia independently from the Royal Spanish Football Federation.

The RFGF, which also administered the Championship of Galicia (a regional league competition whose best teams qualified for the Copa del Rey) until the end of the 1930s, was founded in 1909 and is based in A Coruña.

They also organise A Irmandiña since its revival on 2016.

== Competitions ==
- Copa Xunta
- Tercera Federación (Group 1)
- Preferente de Galicia
- Primeira Galicia
- Segunda Galicia
- Terceira Galicia

== See also ==
- Galicia national football team
- Spanish football league system
