= 1923–24 Prince of Asturias Cup =

Tournament details
- Dates: 11 November 1923 – 26 February 1924
- Teams: 8 (from 1 confederation)

Final positions
- Champions: Catalonia (1st title)
- Runners-up: Centro

Tournament statistics
- Matches played: 8
- Goals scored: 32 (4 per match)
- Top scorer(s): (Spain) Juan Monjardín (5 goals)

The 1923–24 Prince of Asturias Cup was the sixth tournament of the Prince of Asturias Cup, which is an inter-regional football competition contested by the regional selections of Spain.

The pre-favourites to win were the Catalan team because at that time they had great international figures such as the Spanish goalkeeper Ricardo Zamora or the Barcelona players Josep Samitier, the Filipino Paulino Alcántara and the Argentine Emili Sagi-Barba, and they proved the favouritism by prevailing in a dramatic final against a Castile/Madrid XI.

== Squads ==
Eight regional federations participated in the 1923–24 Prince of Asturias Cup: Asturias, Biscay, Catalonia, Centro, Gipuzkoa, Galicia, South and Levante.

== Format ==
The 1923–24 Prince of Asturias Cup was played in a knock-out cup format, with the 8 teams having to play each other in four quarter-finals, two semi-finals and one final.

== Summary ==
The quarter-final ties were the same as the previous year and so were their participants, now being played on opposite fields, except for the duel between Levante and South, which was played on 11 November at the Mestalla Stadium, and just like in the previous tournament, it was the Andalusians who prevailed, taking a 2–0 lead with goals from Brand and Kinké, but the Valencians were determined in taking revenge and fought back, and remarkably, they managed to level the scores at 2–2 with two goals from local hero Cubells, setting the scene for an epic comeback at Valencia, but the South team found a winner thanks to Spencer and advanced to the semi-finals again. A week later at the San Mamés, Biscay and Asturias faced each other again, and unlike Levante, Biscay actually managed to take revenge, eliminating the champions with a 4–2 win, with goals from Carmelo, Laca and Travieso (twice), while Zabala showed why he had been the top goal scorer of the 1922–23 edition with a consolation goal for Asturias. On 25 November, the remaining two quarterfinals were held with Catalonia beating Gipuzkoa again, but this time the match was dominated by the Basques and also by the controversial work of refereeing, with Olivella and Pellicer scoring the local goals at the Les Corts while Gipuzkoa scored a consolation goal in the second-half through former Real Madrid player, René Petit. At the same time, the Centro Team took revenge on Galicia thanks to a lonely goal from De Miguel, in a totally flooded Madrid Stadium and under infernal weather.

The semifinal matches were played on 27 January 1924. Centro and Andalucía met at the El Metropolitano, with the Castilian team triumphing 2–1, thanks to a first half brace from Monjardín. And at Les Corts, Biscay failed to avenge their "Basque cousins" as they lost to Catalonia due to an early goal from Barcelona player Cristóbal Martí. The final was held on 24 February 1924 at the San Mamés and ended in a dramatic 4–4 draw, courtesy of a last-minute equalizer from Catalonia's Emili Sagi-Barba when there were only two minutes left for the end of extra-time. In the replay two days later, Catalonia beat Centro 3–2 with goals from Carulla, Samitier and Piera. Monjardín scored Centro's two consolation goals and because of it, he was crowned the top goal scorer of the tournament with 5 goals, two in the semi-finals and three in the finals.

=== Results ===
Quarter-finals
11 November 1923
(Andalusia) South	3
Valencian Community	2
25 November 1923
Centro	1
Galicia	0
18 November 1923
Biscay	4
Asturias	2
25 November 1923
Catalonia	2
Gipuzkoa	1

Semi-finals
27 January 1924
Centro	2
(Andalusia) South	1
27 January 1924
Catalonia	1
Biscay	0

Final
24 February 1924
Centro	4 (2)
Catalonia	4 (3)

=== Quarter-finals ===
11 November 1923

(Note: the Levante (Valencian Federation) team.) Valencian Community	2–3	(Andalusia) South
Cubells 1–2', 2–2'		Brand 0–1'; Kinké 0–2'; Spencer 2–3'

Mestalla Stadium, Valencia
Referee: (Community of Madrid) Luis Colina

Note: In some sources Montes is listed as the goalscorer of Valencia's second goal.

18 November 1923

Biscay	4–2	Asturias
Carmelo; Laca; Travieso	Report	Bolado; Zabala

San Mamés, Bilbao
Referee: (Community of Madrid) Contreras

Note: In some sources Sesúmaga is listed as the goalscorer of Biscay's opening goal while others claim that Biscay's goals came in the form of two braces scored by Carmelo and Laca.

25 November 1923

Centro	1–0	Galicia
De Miguel	Report; Report2

Ciudad Lineal, Madrid
Referee: (Catalonia) Agustín Cruella Tena

Note: The game was played under infernal weather.

25 November 1923

Catalonia	2–1	Gipuzkoa
Olivella 22'; Pellicer 29'	Report	Petit 51'

Camp de Les Corts, Barcelona, Catalonia
Referee: (Community of Madrid) Ezequiel Montero

Note: In some sources Olivella is listed as the goalscorer of both Catalan goals

=== Semi-finals ===
21 January 1924

Centro	2–1	(Andalusia) South
Monjardín 30', 35'	Report	Herminio 40'

Estadio Metropolitano, Madrid
Referee: (Catalonia) José Llovera Mas

Note: In some sources Fuentes is listed as the goalscorer of South's consolation goal

27 January 1924

Catalonia	1–0	Biscay
Martí 13'	Report; Report2

Camp de Les Corts, Barcelona
Referee: (Community of Madrid) Contreras

=== Final ===
24 February 1924

Catalonia	4–4 (a.e.t.)	Centro
Samitier 35', 38'; Piera 57'; Sagibarba 118'	Report; Report2	Pérez 8'; Triana 42', 75'; Monjardín 95'

San Mamés, Bilbao
Referee: (Basque Country (autonomous community)) José Murguía Ortiz

=== Final Replay ===
26 February 1924

Catalonia	3–2	Centro
Carulla 1–0'; Samitier 2–2'; Piera 3–2'	Report; Report2	Monjardín 1–1', 1–2'

San Mamés, Bilbao
Referee: (Cantabria) Fermín Sánchez

== Winner ==
1923-24 Prince of Asturias Cup winner

Catalonia
Second title

== Statistics ==
=== Top Scorers ===
Rank	Player	Team	Goals	Stage
1	Juan Monjardín	Centro	5	Semi-finals (2) and finals (3)
2	Josep Samitier	Catalonia	3	Semi-finals (1) and finals (2)
3	Travieso	Biscay	2	Quarter-finals (2)
3	Vicente Piera	Catalonia	2	Finals (2)
3	Monchín Triana	Centro	2	Finals (2)
3	Eduardo Cubells	Valencian Community	2	Quarter-finals (2)

== Aftermath ==
The sixth edition of this competition did not achieve the success of the previous one and failed to serve as the basis for forming the Spanish Olympic national team for the 1924 Summer Olympics and after the Spanish failure in Paris, the Prince of Asturias Cup ended up being definitively abolished by the Spanish FA on 26 June 1924.
