= José Luis Zabala =

Spanish footballer

Personal information
- Full name: José Luis Zabala Arrondo
- Date of birth: 14 December 1898
- Place of birth: Irun, Gipuzkoa, Spain
- Date of death: 22 April 1946 (aged 47)
- Place of death: Barcelona, Spain
- Position: Forward

Youth career
- 1914–1916: Sporting de Irún

Senior career*
Years	Team	Apps	(Gls)
1916–1917	Club Izarra de Eibar		
1917–1918	Unión de Irun		
1918–1919	Espanyol		
1919–1923	Real Club Deportivo Oviedo		
1923–1926	Espanyol		
1926–1929	Real Oviedo		
1929-1930	Valencia		

International career
1923-1924	Spain	4	(4)
1922-1923	Asturias	6	(7)
1923-1926	Catalonia	4	(2)

Managerial career
- 1932: UE Sants
- 1934–1936: Girona FC
- 1941–1942: Girona FC
- 1943–1944: FC Lleida
- * Club domestic league appearances and goals

José Luis Zabala (14 December 1898 – 22 April 1946) was a Spanish footballer who played as a forward. He played in four matches for the Spain national football team in 1923 and 1924, scoring four goals, including a hat-trick against Portugal on 16 December of 1923.

== Club career ==
Born in Irun, he began to play football in the youth ranks of his hometown club Sporting de Irún. After short spells at Izarra de Eibar and Unión de Irun, Zabala joined Espanyol in 1918, where he played for a season as a midfielder. After inflicting an injury to an opposing player, he was sanctioned by the Catalan Football Federation, earning three months of inactivity. This fact caused him to leave Espanyol and join Real Club Deportivo Oviedo, which would later merge with Real Stadium Club Ovetense to form Real Oviedo in 1925. In the first-ever Asturian derby between Sporting de Gijón and Real Oviedo (Real Club Deportivo Oviedo at the time) held on 25 January 1920, it was Zabala who scored Oviedo's first equalizer on a 2-2 draw.

After four seasons at Oviedo, Zabala returned to Espanyol in 1923, and in his second spell there, he became a brilliant forward, forming an attacking partnership with the likes of Rafael Oramas, Alfredo Arróniz, and José Padrón, and earning his first international call-ups for the Spanish and the Catalan national teams. In 1926 he returned to Oviedo and finished his career at Valencia in the 1929–30 season.

== International career ==
He made his debut for Spain on 28 January 1923 against France, and scored his side's second in a 3–0 win. In his next cap on 16 December 1923 he scored again, netting a hat-trick in the Iberian derby to help his side to a 3–0 win. In total, Zabala scored 4 goals in 4 caps. He scored another hat-trick for Spain in a 7–0 win over a Catalonia XI on 13 March 1924.

Being a Real Oviedo, he was eligible to play for the Asturias team, being one of the eleven footballers that played in the team's first-ever game on 4 June 1922, in a friendly against St Mirren F.C., and even though they lost 3–7, Zabala was the author of the first goal in the team's history. The Regional Asturian team then played seven official games between 1922 and 1926 in the Prince of Asturias Cup, winning the 1922–23 edition, largely thanks to Zabala who scored twice in their 4–3 win over Biscay in the quarter-finals, followed by a last-minute winner against Catalonia in the semi-finals and to seal his memorable campaign in style, he netted a second-half brace in the final to give his side a 3–1 win over Galicia. His brace in the final game of the tournament saw him become the top goal scorer of the tournament with 5 goals. However, the following edition of the competition wasn't as successful because Asturias were knocked out by Biscay in the quarter-finals despite yet another Zabala goal. With those 6 goals, Zabala is the all-time top goal scorer of the prince of Asturias Cup along with Kinké and Juan Monjardín, who also scored 6 goals. Zabala is also the record-goalscorer of the Asturian team with 7 goals.

When he returned to Espanyol in 1923, he become eligible to play for the Catalan national team, however, due to the little statistical rigor that the newspapers had at that time, the exact amount of caps he earned is unknown.

=== International goals ===
==== Goals for Spain ====
Spain score listed first, score column indicates score after each Zabala goal.

List of international goals scored by José Luis Zabala
No.	Date	Venue	Opponent	Score	Result	Competition
1	28 January 1923	Atotxa Stadium, San Sebastián, Spain	France	2–0	3–0	Friendly
2	16 December 1923	Reina Victoria, Seville, Spain	Portugal	1–0	3–0	Friendly
3	16 December 1923	Reina Victoria, Seville, Spain	Portugal	2–0	3–0	Friendly
4	16 December 1923	Reina Victoria, Seville, Spain	Portugal	3–0	3–0	Friendly

==== Goals for Asturias ====
Asturias score listed first, score column indicates score after each Zabala goal.

List of international goals scored by José Luis Zabala
No.	Date	Venue	Opponent	Score	Result	Competition
1	4 June 1922	El Molinón, Gijón, Spain	St Mirren F.C.		3–7	Friendly
2	13 November 1922	El Molinón, Gijón, Spain	Biscay	1–0	4–3	1922-23 Prince of Asturias Cup quarter-finals replay
3	13 November 1922	El Molinón, Gijón, Spain	Biscay	2–1	4–3	1922-23 Prince of Asturias Cup quarter-finals replay
4	14 January 1923	El Molinón, Gijón, Spain	Catalonia	1–0	1–0	1922-23 Prince of Asturias Cup semi-finals
5	25 February 1923	Coia, Vigo, Spain	Galicia	2–1	3–1	1922-23 Prince of Asturias Cup final
6	25 February 1923	Coia, Vigo, Spain	Galicia	3–1	3–1	1922-23 Prince of Asturias Cup final
7	18 November 1923	San Mamés, Bilbao, Spain	Biscay	2–2	2–4	1923-24 Prince of Asturias Cup quarter-finals

== Honours ==
=== Club ===
Unión de Irun

- Copa del Rey:
  - Champions (1): 1918

=== International ===
Asturias XI

- Prince of Asturias Cup:
  - Champions (1): 1922-23

=== Individual ===
Asturias XI

- Top goalscorer of the 1922-23 Prince of Asturias Cup with 5 goals

=== Records ===
- All-time top goal scorer of the Prince of Asturias Cup with 6 goals
- All-time top goal scorer of Asturias with 7 goals
