= Asturias autonomous football team =

Regional football team for Asturias, Spain

Asturias
- Association: Royal Asturias Football Federation (RFFPA)
- Top scorer: José Luis Zabala (7)
First colours

First international
- Asturias 3–7 St Mirren F.C. (Scotland) (Gijón, Spain; 4 June 1922)

Biggest win
- Asturias 6–1 Lithuania (Gijón, Spain; 29 December 2001)

Biggest defeat
- Asturias 3–7 St Mirren F.C. (Scotland) (Gijón, Spain; 4 June 1922)

Prince of Asturias Cup
- Appearances: 3 (first in 1922-23 Prince of Asturias Cup)
- Best result: Champions, 1922-23 Prince of Asturias Cup

The Asturias autonomous football team is the regional football team for Asturias. They are not affiliated with FIFA or UEFA, instead represented internationally by the Spain national football team.

Initially formed in 1915 as a partnership between Cantabrian and Asturian teams (before splitting shortly after in 1918), the team competed in the short-lived Prince of Asturias Cup, winning the 1922–23 edition. They now only play friendlies, the most recent being in 2001–03 after a 64-year gap since their previous game.

== History ==
=== Cantabric Federation and the Prince of Asturias Cup ===
The Regional Cantabric Federation of Football Clubs was founded on 9 December 1915 with the aim to represent all the clubs in the Province of Oviedo. On 22 November 1916, the Spanish Football Federation allowed the clubs of Cantabria to leave the Northern Regional Championship and join the newly created Cantabrian Regional Federation, along with clubs from Oviedo, soon to be renamed Asturias.

The Cantabrians joined forces with the Asturian clubs to form the 'Cantabric Team' and played four official matches between 1917 and 1918 in the defunct Prince of Asturias Cup, an inter-regional competition organized by the Spanish Federation. This Cantabric side had the likes of the Villaverde brothers (Fernando and Senén), Manuel Argüelles and Manuel Meana, with the latter two going on to represent the Asturias national team in the 1920s.

=== Asturian Federation and cup victory ===
On 28 May 1918, the Cantabrian clubs returned to the Northern Federation, and the Spanish Federation agreed to change the name of the Cantabric Federation to the Regional Asturian Federation of Football Clubs. On 4 June 1922, the Asturias autonomous football team played its first game in a friendly against St Mirren F.C., losing 3–7 with the goalscorers José Luis Zabala, Manuel Argüelles and Domingo.

Between 1922 and 1926, the Asturian team played seven official games in the Prince of Asturias Cup, winning the 1922–23 edition. Their success that year was largely thanks to key player José Luis Zabala, who scored in every stage of the competition; twice in a 4–3 extra-time win over Biscay in the quarter-finals, followed by a last-minute winner against Catalonia in the semis, and a second-half brace in the final to give his side a 3–1 win over Galicia after an equaliser from Manuel Meana.

In 1925 there was no Prince of Asturias Cup, but a two-legged friendly was organised against Cantabria, resulting in a 4–3 loss on aggregate. The second leg, a 1–0 loss, was decided by an own goal from Manuel Meana, who formerly played for Cantabria.

In 1926, the last edition of the Prince of Asturias Cup was organised as a two-legged final between the winners of the previous two years, being Asturias and Catalonia. Catalonia won both games (2–0 and 4–3), leaving Asturias in second. During the 1930s, the Asturian team continued playing several friendly games until the Spanish Civil War.

=== Revival in the 2000s ===
On 23 December 2000, the Royal Asturian Football Federation revived the Regional team for the first time since 1936, for a friendly against Macedonia at Estadio Carlos Tartiere in Oviedo. Their starters included Asturian-born players Luis Enrique, Esteban, and Miguel Ángel Angulo, as well as Antón and Tinín who both played in the last Asturias game in 1936. In front of a crowd of 30,000, Asturias won 1–0 with Juanele scoring the only goal of the match.

Asturias played two more games over the next two years, beating Lithuania 6–1 in Gijón on 30 December 2001, and winning 5–3 against Honduras in Avilés on 29 December 2002. They played no further games in this period, remaining unbeaten.

In December 2008, a friendly game against Sporting de Gijón legends was going to be organized, but in the end, it was canceled.

== Competitive record ==
Copa Príncipe de Asturias record
Year	Position	Pld	W	D	L	GF	GA
1922–23	Champion	4	3	1	0	9	5
1923–24	Quarterfinalist	1	0	0	1	2	4
1925–26	Runners-up	2	0	0	2	3	6
Total		7	3	1	3	14	15

== Results ==
=== Cantabric ===
10 May 1917 1917 Prince of Asturias Cup	Cantabric	0–1	Catalonia	Madrid
		Report	Gumbau 30'	Stadium: Campo de O'Donnell; Referee: (Community of Madrid) Menéndez

11 May 1917 1917 Prince of Asturias Cup	Castile	3–2	Cantabric	Madrid
	Castell 20' (pen.); Agüero 30'; Villaverde 45'	Report	Felgueroso 50'; Pascual 60' (o.g.)	Stadium: Campo de O'Donnell; Referee: (Basque Country (autonomous community)) Pelayo Serrano

20 January 1918 1918 Prince of Asturias Cup	Castile	3–2	Cantabric	Madrid
	Sansinenea; Gomar; Rey	Report	Villaverde III; Villaverde I	Stadium: Campo de O'Donnell; Referee: (Basque Country (autonomous community)) Pelayo Serrano

23 January 1918 1918 Prince of Asturias Cup	Castile	3–1	Cantabric	Madrid
	Sansinenea; Olalquiaga	Report	Villaverde III	Stadium: Campo de O'Donnell; Referee: (Community of Madrid) Carlos Dieste

==== Notes ====
1. The Central Federation team (Spanish: Equipo de la Centro Federación), including Madrid and the wider Castile region.
2. The Cantabric (Spanish: Cantábrico) team, including Asturias and Cantabria.

=== Asturias ===
4 June 1922 Friendly	Asturias	3–7	St Mirren F.C.	Gijón, Asturias
	Zabala; Argüelles (pen.); Domingo	Report	Walker; Gillies	Stadium: El Molinón; Referee: (Asturias) Fernando Villaverde

12 November 1922 1922–23 Prince of Asturias Cup quarter-finals	Asturias	1–1	Biscay	Gijón, Asturias
	Arcadio 38'	Report	Larraza 25'	Stadium: El Molinón; Referee: (Basque Country (autonomous community)) Murguía

13 November 1922 1922–23 Prince of Asturias Cup quarter-finals replay	Asturias	4–3 (a.e.t.)	Biscay	Gijón, Asturias
	Zabala 30', 95'; Barril 125', 144'	Report	Travieso 33'; Acedo 111'; Careaga 132' (pen.)	Stadium: El Molinón; Referee: (Basque Country (autonomous community)) Murguía
Note: After the end of the match (1–1), an overtime of one hour was played.

14 January 1923 1922–23 Prince of Asturias Cup semi-finals	Asturias	1–0	Catalonia	Gijón, Asturias
	Zabala 90'	Report		Stadium: El Molinón; Attendance: 6,000; Referee: (Basque Country (autonomous community)) Torra

25 February 1923 1922–23 Prince of Asturias Cup Final	Galicia	1–3	Asturias	Vigo, Galicia
	Balbino (1–0)	Report	Meana (1–1); Zabala (1–2)	Stadium: Coia; Referee: (Basque Country (autonomous community)) Leclerc

18 November 1923 1923–24 Prince of Asturias Cup quarter-finals	Biscay	4–2	Asturias	Bilbao, Basque Country
	Carmelo (1–1); Laca (2–1); Travieso (3–2)	Report	Bolado (0–1); Zabala (2–2)	Stadium: San Mamés; Referee: (Community of Madrid) Contreras

3 May 1925 Friendly	Cantabria	3–3	Asturias	Santander, Cantabria
	Óscar 38' (pen.), 79' ? (2–2)	Report	Abdón 28'; Domingo (0–2); Trucha (2–3)	Stadium: El Sardinero; Referee: (Catalonia) Blanco

21 June 1925 Friendly	Asturias	0–1	Cantabria	Gijón, Asturias
		Report	Meana (?)	Stadium: El Molinón; Referee: Alejandro Quintana

5 September 1926 1926 Prince of Asturias Cup Final	Asturias	0–2	Catalonia	Gijón, Asturias
		Report1; Report2	Broto 22', 80'	Stadium: El Molinón; Referee: (Basque Country (autonomous community)) Steimborn Ludeuvik

19 September 1926 1926 Prince of Asturias Cup Final	Catalonia	4–3	Asturias	Barcelona, Catalonia
	Forgas 10', 82'; Pellicer 59'; Alcántara 79'	Report1; Report2	Avilesu 5'; Herrera 85', 87'	Stadium: Guinardó; Referee: (Basque Country (autonomous community)) Steimborn Ludeuvik

10 July 1932 Friendly	Asturias	3–1	Lisbon	Gijón, Asturias
	Lángara 12', 25'; Gallart 83'	Report	Héctor 28'	Stadium: El Molinón; Referee: Vieira

30 October 1932 Friendly	Lisbon	1–2	Asturias	Lisbon, Portugal
	Héctor (1–0)	Report	Gallart (1–1); Inciarte (1–2)	Stadium: Estádio do Lumiar; Referee: Joaquín Menchaca

6 November 1932 Friendly	Porto	2–1	Asturias	Porto, Portugal
	Valdemar (1–0) (2–1)	Report	Herrera (1–1)	Stadium: Campo do Ameal; Referee: Figuereido

16 June 1934 Friendly	Asturias	5–2	Mexico	Gijón, Asturias
	Emilín 10'; Lángara 40'; Gallart 75'; Herrerita 88'; Casuco 89'	Report 1 Report 2	Alonso 5'; Mejía 20'	Stadium: El Molinón; Referee: Amadeo Sánchez

28 August 1936 Friendly	Asturias	3–3	(Belgium) Brussels XI	Gijón, Asturias
	Antón (1–1); Meana	Report	(0–1)	Stadium: El Molinón; Referee: Merediz

23 December 2000 Friendly	Asturias	1–0	Macedonia	Oviedo, Asturias
	Juanele 50'	Report; Summary		Stadium: Carlos Tartiere; Attendance: 25,000; Referee: Mejuto González

29 December 2001 Friendly	Asturias	6–1	Lithuania	Gijón, Asturias
	Oli 3'; Pablo Lago 20'; Juanele 35', 51'; José Manuel 58'; César 81'	Report	Dančenka 64' (pen.)	Stadium: El Molinón; Attendance: 13,000; Referee: Muñiz Fernández

28 December 2002 Friendly	Asturias	5–3	Honduras	Avilés, Asturias
	Abelardo 6'; Mario 13'; Oli 16'; Villa 30'; Miguel 61'	Report	Saúl Martínez 31', 37', 83'	Stadium: Román Suárez Puerta; Attendance: 7,000; Referee: Mejuto González

== Statistics since 2000 ==
Name	Pos	Years	Caps	Goals
Esteban	GK	2000–2002	3	0
Juanjo	GK	2000	1	0
Julio Iglesias	GK	2001–2002	2	0
Abelardo	DF	2002	1	1
Dani Amieva	DF	2000	1	0
Boris	DF	2000–2001	2	0
César	DF	2000–2002	3	1
Isma	DF	2001	1	0
Jaime	DF	2000	1	0
Javi Venta	DF	2001–2002	2	0
José Manuel	DF	2000–2002	3	1
Manel	DF	2000–2002	3	0
Muñiz	DF	2000	1	0
Pablo	DF	2002	1	0
Sietes	DF	2000–2002	3	0
Urbano	DF	2002	1	0
Miguel Ángel Angulo	MF	2000	1	0
Caco Morán	MF	2000	1	0
Francisco Javier Castaño	MF	2001–2002	2	0
Miguel Cobas	MF	2002	1	0
Iván Ania	MF	2000–2002	3	0
Iván Iglesias	MF	2000	1	0
Manolo	MF	2001–2002	2	0
Mario Cotelo	MF	2000–2002	3	1
Pablo Lago	MF	2000–2001	2	1
Juanele	FW	2000–2001	2	3
Luis Enrique	FW	2000	1	0
Javier Manjarín	FW	2000	1	0
Miguel	FW	2002	1	1
Oli	FW	2000–2002	3	2
Pablo Álvarez	FW	2001	1	0
Quique Martín	FW	2000	1	0
David Villa	FW	2001–2002	2	1

== Selected former coaches ==
- José Manuel Díaz Novoa (2000–2002)
- Marcelino García Toral

== Honours ==
Prince of Asturias Cup:

- Champions (1): 1922–23
- Runners-up (2): 1918 (Note: As part of the Cantabria team.) and 1926

== Amateur team (UEFA Regions' Cup) ==
The Asturias amateur football team is mostly composed of players in Tercera División and lower, and plays biannually in the Spanish stage of the UEFA Regions' Cup. This distinguishes it from the Asturias autonomous football team, which is not UEFA- or FIFA-affiliated and only plays friendlies, therefore having no restrictions on players being professional.

The amateur teams' biggest achievement was to qualify for the Final tournament of the 2003 UEFA Regions' Cup, after winning the Spanish stage.

== Women's team ==
Asturias
- Association: Royal Asturias Football Federation (RFFPA)
- Head coach: Montse Tomé
First colours

First international
- Cantabria 3–2 Asturias (Santa Cruz de Bezana, Spain; 19 May 2019)

Biggest defeat
- Cantabria 3–2 Asturias (Santa Cruz de Bezana, Spain; 19 May 2019); Asturias 0–1 Navarre (Avilés, Spain; 23 December 2025)

The women's team made its debut on 19 May 2019 in Santa Cruz de Bezana, Cantabria. They were defeated 2–3 by Cantabria.

On 4 December 2025, the Royal Football Federation of the Principality of Asturias announced a friendly match against Navarre, that was played in Avilés on 23 December 2025.

=== Head coaches ===
- Javier Martino (2019)
- Montse Tomé (2025–present)

=== Current squad ===
- The following players were called up for the friendly against Navarre.

Caps and goals are correct, as of 23 December 2025.

No.	Pos.	Player	Date of birth (age)	Caps	Goals	Club
	GK	Cheza (es)	17 September 2001 (age 25)	1	0	(Royal Spanish Football Federation) Sevilla
	GK	Cristina Carbajal	27 October 2000 (age 26)	1	0	(Royal Football Federation of the Principality of Asturias) Sporting Gijón
	DF	Sara Barreda	12 June 2008 (age 18)	1	0	(Royal Spanish Football Federation) Deportivo La Coruña
	DF	Iris Arnaiz	18 May 1994 (age 32)	1	0	(Royal Spanish Football Federation) Sevilla
	DF	Rosa Menéndez	19 December 2004 (age 21)	1	0	(Royal Football Federation of the Principality of Asturias) Sporting Gijón
	DF	Andrea Sordo	18 October 2005 (age 21)	1	0	(Royal Football Federation of the Principality of Asturias) Oviedo
	DF	Yaiza Cernuda	26 March 2004 (age 22)	1	0	(Royal Football Federation of the Principality of Asturias) Sporting Gijón
	DF	María Jareño	28 November 2003 (age 22)	1	0	(Royal Football Federation of the Principality of Asturias) Sporting Gijón
	DF	Pañu	20 July 1999 (age 27)	1	0	(Royal Spanish Football Federation) As Celtas
	DF	Paz Sánchez	16 March 2003 (age 23)	1	0	(Royal Spanish Football Federation) Huesca
	DF	Nuria Cueto	21 May 2003 (age 23)	1	0	(Royal Football Federation of the Principality of Asturias) Sporting Gijón
	MF	Cienfu	8 April 2001 (age 25)	2	0	(Royal Spanish Football Federation) Villarreal
	MF	Olaya Rodríguez	10 May 2005 (age 21)	1	0	(Royal Spanish Football Federation) Deportivo La Coruña
	MF	Noelia Fernández	3 August 2003 (age 23)	1	0	(Royal Spanish Football Federation) AEM
	MF	Redru	27 January 2007 (age 19)	1	0	(Royal Spanish Football Federation) Deportivo La Coruña
	MF	Anina	27 July 2004 (age 22)	1	0	(Royal Football Federation of the Principality of Asturias) Oviedo
	FW	Daniela González	31 March 2003 (age 23)	1	0	(Royal Football Federation of the Principality of Asturias) Avilés Industrial
	FW	Sonso	4 January 2007 (age 19)	1	0	(Royal Spanish Football Federation) Deportivo La Coruña
	FW	Inés Santamaría	5 November 2003 (age 23)	1	0	(Royal Football Federation of the Principality of Asturias) Gijón FF
	FW	Érika González	31 August 2004 (age 22)	1	0	(Royal Spanish Football Federation) Levante
	FW	Daniela Valbuena	6 November 2007 (age 19)	1	0	(Royal Spanish Football Federation) Deportivo La Coruña
	FW	Isina	14 February 1996 (age 30)	1	0	(Royal Spanish Football Federation) DUX Logroño

=== Matches played ===
19 May 2019	Cantabria	3–2	Asturias	Santa Cruz de Bezana
12:00	Alba 9'; Jimena 10'; Athenea 87'	Report	Méndez 50'; Moro 80'	Stadium: Municipal; Referee: Bolado Palencia

23 December 2025	Asturias	0–1	Navarre	Avilés
18:00		Report	Zumárraga 20'	Stadium: Román Suárez Puerta; Attendance: 3,000; Referee: Sara Fernández Ceferino

=== Notable players ===
- María Méndez
- Lucía García

== See also ==
- Category:Footballers from Asturias
