= Galician Championship =

- Organising body: Galician Football Federation
- Founded: 1905
- First season: 1905–06
- Folded: 1940
- Country: Galicia, Spain
- Feeder to: Copa del Rey
- Last champions: Deportivo Coruña (6th title)
- Most championships: Celta Vigo; Deportivo Coruña (6 titles each)

The Galician Championship was an official regional football tournament in Spain, contested between teams from Galicia. The Galician Football Federation, founded in 1909, was responsible for regulating both the tournament and football in the Galician region from the 1913–14 season onwards. Seven championships had been held before this time, but these are not considered official as the federation was not yet established. These earlier championships were organized by Real Vigo Sporting Club after receiving a silver cup donated by King Alfonso XIII of Spain.

== Results ==
=== Unofficial Championship of Galicia ===
Season	Champion	Runner-up	Notes
1905–06	Fortuna FC	Vigo FC	
1906–07	Vigo FC	Fortuna FC	0–0 / 0–0 / 1–0
1907–08	Vigo FC	Sporting Club Vigo	
1908–09	Real Fortuna FC Vigo	Español FC Vigo	
1909–10	Real Fortuna FC Vigo	Victoria F.C	Victoria F.C failed to turn up.
1910–11	Real Fortuna FC Vigo	Real Club Coruña	Real Club Coruña failed to turn up.
1911–12	Real Fortuna FC Vigo	Vigo FC	Two-legged tie.

=== Championship of Galicia (Campeonato Regional de Galicia) ===
Season	Championship Name	Champion	Runner-up
1912–13	not played		
1913–14	Campeonato Regional de Galicia	Real Vigo SC	Real Fortuna FC Vigo
1914–15	Campeonato Regional de Galicia	Real Fortuna FC Vigo	Real Vigo SC
1915–16	not played (TS) ‡		
1916–17	Campeonato Regional de Galicia	Real Vigo SC	Real Fortuna FC Vigo
1917–18	cancelled by the Galician Football Federation		
1918–19	Campeonato Regional de Galicia	Real Vigo SC	Real Fortuna FC Vigo
1919–20	Campeonato Regional de Galicia	Real Vigo SC	RCD La Coruña
1920–21	Campeonato Regional de Galicia	Real Fortuna FC Vigo	Real Vigo SC
1921–22	Campeonato Regional de Galicia	Real Fortuna FC Vigo	Pontevedra AC
1922–23	Campeonato Regional de Galicia	Real Vigo SC	Real Fortuna FC Vigo
1923–24	Campeonato Regional de Galicia	RC Celta de Vigo	Racing Ferrol
1924–25	Campeonato Regional de Galicia	RC Celta de Vigo	RCD La Coruña
1925–26	Campeonato Regional de Galicia	RC Celta de Vigo	RCD La Coruña
1926–27	Campeonato Regional de Galicia	RCD La Coruña	RC Celta de Vigo
1927–28	Campeonato Regional de Galicia	RCD La Coruña	RC Celta de Vigo
1928–29	Campeonato Regional de Galicia	Racing Ferrol	RC Celta de Vigo
1929–30	Campeonato Regional de Galicia	RC Celta de Vigo	RCD La Coruña
1930–31	Campeonato Regional de Galicia	RCD La Coruña	RC Celta de Vigo
1931–32	Campeonato Regional de Galicia	RC Celta de Vigo	RCD La Coruña
1932–33	Campeonato Regional de Galicia	RCD La Coruña	Racing Ferrol
1933–34	Campeonato Regional de Galicia	RC Celta de Vigo	RCD La Coruña
1934–35	Campeonato Regional de Galicia	Unión Sporting Club Vigo	Club Lemos
1934–35	Campeonato Regional Mancomunado Galáico-Astur (Zona gallega)	RC Celta de Vigo	RCD La Coruña
1934–35	Campeonato Regional Mancomunado Galáico-Astur (Zona asturiana)	Oviedo FC	SC Gijón
1935–36	Campeonato Regional de Galicia	Club Lemos	Club Coruña
1935–36	Campeonato Regional Mancomunado Galáico-Astur (Zona Astur-Gallega)	Oviedo FC	Unión Sporting Club Vigo
1936–37	Campeonato Regional de Galicia	RCD La Coruña	RC Celta de Vigo
1937–38	Campeonato Regional de Galicia	Racing Ferrol	RC Celta de Vigo
1938–39	Campeonato Regional de Galicia	Racing Ferrol	RCD La Coruña
1939–40	Campeonato Regional de Galicia	RCD La Coruña	FC Vigués

Notes:

- ‡ The 1915–16 championship was not played due to conflicts between the clubs. Real Fortuna FC Vigo called themselves as champions while the other clubs played the Campeonato de Honor. In the final Real Vigo Sporting defeated Deportivo Auténtico FC Coruña.

== Champions ==
Club	Champions	Runners-up	Years
RC Celta de Vigo	7	6	1923–24, 1924–25, 1925–26, 1929–30, 1931–32, 1933–34, 1934–35
RCD La Coruña	6	8	1926–27, 1927–28, 1930–31, 1932–33, 1936–37, 1939–40
Real Vigo SC	5	2	1913–14, 1916–17, 1918–19, 1919–20, 1922–23
Real Fortuna FC Vigo	3	4	1914–15, 1920–21, 1921–22
Racing Ferrol	3	2	1928–29, 1937–38, 1938–39
Oviedo FC	2	–	1934–35, 1935–36
Unión Sporting Club Vigo	1	1	1934–35
Club Lemos	1	1	1935–36
Pontevedra AC	–	1	–
SC Gijón	–	1	–
Club Coruña	–	1	–
FC Vigués	–	1	–
TOTAL	28	28	–

- Notes: Unofficial Championship of Galicia are not taken into account.

== See also ==
- Galicia official football team
- Galician Amateur Championship
- RC Celta de Vigo
