= Campo de Coia =

Sports venue in Coia, Vigo, Spain

Coia
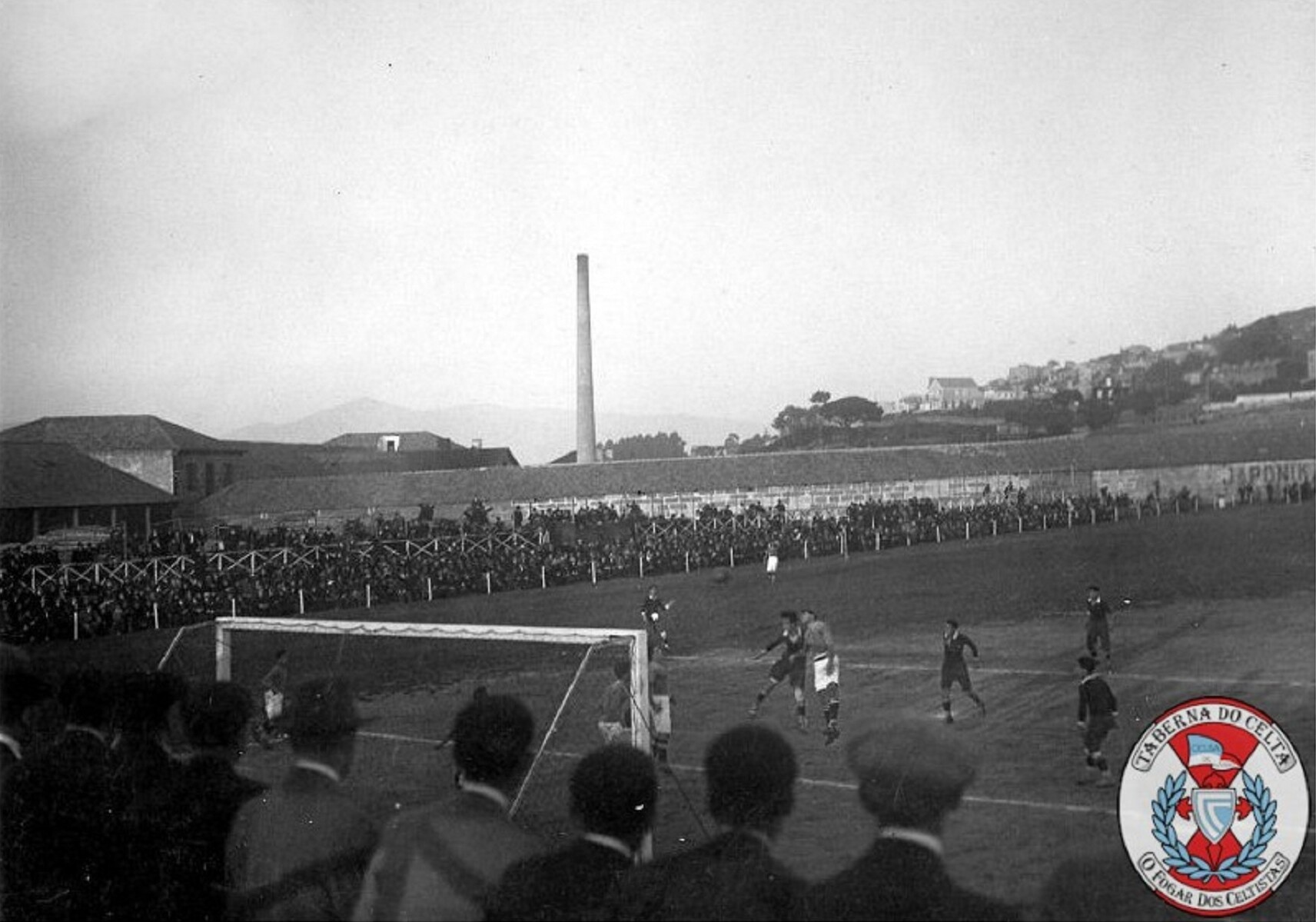
- Interactive map of Coia
- Full name: Campo de Coia
- Location: Coia, Vigo, Spain
- Coordinates: 42.227457°N 8.735936°W
- Owner: Real Club Celta de Vigo
- Surface: Grass
- Field size: 101 m × 60.5 m (331 ft × 198 ft)

Construction
- Opened: February 9, 1908
- Closed: December 1928

Tenants
- Real Vigo Sporting Club (1908–1923); Real Club Celta de Vigo (1923–1928)

Campo de Coia (Coia Football Ground) was a sporting venue in Coia, Vigo, Spain, which was the home ground of Celta Vigo, and its predecessor Vigo Sporting Club, between 9 February 1908 and December 1928.

On 14 May 1922, it hosted the 1922 Copa del Rey Final between FC Barcelona and Real Unión which FC Barcelona easily won with 5–1.

The last match ever played at Coia was the first-leg of the quarter-finals of the Copa de España, on December 9, 1928, against Real Sociedad. Which ended in a 2–1 win for the local team. They would go on to lose the return leg 3–0 in San Sebastián.

The site is now occupied by a Lidl supermarket, residential housing and a park.

== See also ==
- 1922 Copa del Rey
- 1928 Copa del Rey
