= 1916–17 Madrid FC season =

15th season in existence of Real Madrid CF

Madrid FC
1916–17 season
- President: Pedro Parages
- Manager: Arthur Johnson
- Stadium: Campo de O'Donnell
- Campeonato Regional Centro (Note: The Campeonato Regional Centro (Central Regional Championship) was a regional league used as a qualifier for the Copa del Rey.): 1st
- Copa del Rey: Winners
- Top goalscorer: League: Juan Petit (9); All: Santiago Bernabéu (14)
- Biggest win: Madrid FC 8–1 Sevilla FC
- Biggest defeat: España FC 3–1 Madrid FC
Home colours	Away colours

The 1916–17 season was Madrid Football Club's 15th season in existence. The club played some friendly matches. They also played in the Campeonato Regional Centro (Central Regional Championship) and the Copa del Rey, winning both competitions.

== Players ==
Note: Flags indicate national team as defined under FIFA eligibility rules; some limited exceptions apply. Players may hold more than one non-FIFA nationality.

No.	Pos.	Nation	Player
—	GK	ESP	Eduardo Teus
—	GK	ESP	Enrique Bertrán de Lis
—	DF	ESP	José Antonio Erice
—	DF	ESP	José Esteban Múgica
—	DF	ESP	Julio Gómez de la Serna
—	MF	ESP	José María Castell
—	MF	FRA	René Petit
—	MF	ESP	Alberto Machimbarrena

No.	Pos.	Nation	Player
—	MF	ARG	Eulogio Aranguren
—	MF	ARG	Sotero Aranguren
—	MF	ESP	Luis Saura
—	FW	ESP	Fernando Muguiro
—	FW	ESP	Ricardo Álvarez
—	FW	ESP	Antonio de Miguel
—	FW	FRA	Juan José Petit
—	FW	ESP	José María Sansinenea
—	FW	ESP	Santiago Bernabéu

== Friendlies ==
30 July 1916 Friendly	Club Alfonso XIII	1–6	Madrid FC	Madrid
	?? (?)	Report	Álvarez (?) ?? (?)	Stadium: Av. Plaza de Toros; Referee: Montero

1 October 1916 Friendly	Madrid FC	4–2	Fortuna de Vigo	Madrid
		Report		Stadium: Campo de O'Donnell

3 October 1916 Friendly	Madrid FC	1–0	Fortuna de Vigo	Madrid
		Report		Stadium: Campo de O'Donnell

8 October 1916 Friendly	Madrid FC	2–1	Racing de Madrid	Madrid
		Report		Stadium: Campo de O'Donnell

8 October 1916 Friendly – Reserve	Madrid FC	1–0	Unión SC	Madrid
		Report		Stadium: Campo de O'Donnell
Note: Madrid FC fielded their reserve team for this match.

26 October 1916 Friendly	Madrid FC	7–1	Ariñ Sport	Madrid
		Report		Stadium: Campo de O'Donnell

6 December 1916 Friendly	Madrid FC	6–1	Deportivo de La Coruña	Madrid
		Report		Stadium: Campo de O'Donnell

8 December 1916 Friendly	Madrid FC	3–0	Deportivo de La Coruña	Madrid
		Report		Stadium: Campo de O'Donnell

17 December 1916 Friendly	Madrid FC	4–2	Deportivo Auténtico	Madrid
		Report		Stadium: Campo de O'Donnell

24 December 1916 Friendly	RS Gimnástica	1–8	Madrid FC	Madrid
		Report		Stadium: Princesa

28 December 1916 Friendly	Madrid FC (Spain)	2–2	(Switzerland) FC L'Étoile	Madrid, Spain
		Report		Stadium: Campo de O'Donnell

29 December 1916 Friendly	Madrid FC (Spain)	5–0	(Switzerland) FC L'Étoile	Madrid, Spain
		Report		Stadium: Campo de O'Donnell

1 January 1917 Friendly	Athletic Bilbao	3–1	Madrid FC	Bilbao
		Report		Stadium: San Mamés Stadium

7 January 1917 Friendly	Madrid FC	2–1	Athletic Bilbao	Madrid
		Report		Stadium: Campo de O'Donnell

25 January 1917 Friendly	Madrid FC	4–0	RS Gimnástica	Madrid
		Report		Stadium: Campo de O'Donnell
Note: The match was sponsored by the newspaper El Imparcial to raise funds to benefit poor residents of Madrid.

23 February 1917 Friendly	Madrid FC	1–1	Real Unión	Madrid
		Report		Stadium: Campo de O'Donnell

25 February 1917 Friendly	Madrid FC	0–1	Real Unión	Madrid
		Report		Stadium: Campo de O'Donnell

4 March 1917 Friendly	Madrid FC	5–0	RS Gimnástica	Madrid
		Report		Stadium: Campo de O'Donnell

22 March 1917 Friendly	Madrid FC	0–1	Real Sociedad	Madrid
		Report		Stadium: Campo de O'Donnell

24 March 1917 Friendly	Madrid FC	0–0	Real Sociedad	Madrid
		Report		Stadium: Campo de O'Donnell

29 March 1917 Friendly	Athletic Madrid	1–2	Madrid FC	Madrid
		Report		Stadium: Campo de O'Donnell

31 March 1917 Friendly – Reserve	Madrid FC	5–0	RS Alfonso XIII Mallorca	Madrid
		Report		Stadium: Campo de O'Donnell
Note: Madrid FC fielded its reserve team in this match.

2 April 1917 Friendly – Reserve	Madrid FC	4–1	RS Alfonso XIII Mallorca	Madrid
		Report		Stadium: Campo de O'Donnell
Note: Madrid FC fielded its reserve team in this match.

25 May 1917 Friendly	Madrid FC	3–2	Real Sociedad	Madrid
		Report		Stadium: Campo de O'Donnell

=== Copa Foronda ===
21 April 1917 Copa Foronda	Madrid FC	3–1	FC Barcelona	Madrid
	Bernabéu 10' (?); Sansinenea (?)	Report	Martínez 5'	Stadium: Campo de O'Donnell; Referee: Torrens

23 April 1917 Copa Foronda	Madrid FC	0–0	FC Barcelona	Madrid
		Report		Stadium: Campo de O'Donnell; Referee: Larrañaga

=== Copa Espuñes / Copa Maura ===
20 May 1917 Semifinal	Madrid FC	1–0	Athletic Madrid	Madrid
		Report		Stadium: Campo de O'Donnell

20 May 1917 Final	Madrid FC	0–1	Racing de Madrid	Madrid
		Report		Stadium: Campo de O'Donnell

== Competitions ==
=== Overview ===
Competition	First match	Last match	Starting round	Final position	Record							
Competition	First match	Last match	Starting round	Final position	Pld	W	D	L	GF	GA	GD	Win %
Campeonato Regional Centro	5 November 1916	9 March 1917	Matchday 1	Winners	6	6	0	0	28	8	+20	100.00
Copa del Rey	11 March 1917	15 May 1917	Quarterfinals	Winners	9	5	2	2	23	10	+13	55.56
Total					15	11	2	2	51	18	+33	73.33

Source: Competitions

=== Campeonato Regional Centro ===
==== League table ====
Pos	Team	Pld	W	D	L	GF	GA	GD	Pts	Qualification
1	Madrid (C, Q)	6	6	0	0	28	8	+20	12	Qualification for the Copa del Rey.
2	Athletic Madrid	6	3	0	3	8	8	0	6	
3	Racing Madrid	6	2	0	4	7	14	−7	4	
4	RS Gimnástica (R)	6	1	0	5	5	18	−13	2	Qualification for the relegation play-offs

Source: Rec.Sport.Soccer Statistics Foundation
Rules for classification: 1) points; 2) goal difference; 3) number of goals scored.
(C) Champions; (Q) Qualified for the phase indicated; (R) Relegated

==== Matches ====
5 November 1916 1	Athletic Madrid	2–3	Madrid FC	Madrid
	Pagaza (?)	Report	Alvárez (?); Bernabéu (?); Machimbarrena (?)	Stadium: Campo de Vallecas; Referee: Montero

26 November 1916 2	Madrid FC	4–2	RS Gimnástica	Madrid
	Serrano (?); Machimbarrena (?); Petit (?); J. Petit (?)	Report	Uribarri (?); A. De Miguel (?)	Stadium: Campo de O'Donnell; Referee: Larrañaga

3 December 1916 3	Madrid FC	4–3	Racing de Madrid	Madrid
	J. Petit (?); Bernabéu (?); Alvárez (?)	Report	Larrañaga (?); Martínez (?); Pelao (?)	Stadium: Campo de O'Donnell; Referee: Ruete

23 January 1917 4	Madrid FC	3–0	Athletic Madrid	Madrid
	J. Petit 5'; De Miguel (?); Sansinesea (?)	Report		Stadium: Campo de O'Donnell; Referee: Larrañaga

21 February 1917 5	Racing de Madrid	1–5	Madrid FC	Madrid
	Pascual (?)	Report	J. Petit (?); Sansinesea (?)	Stadium: Martínez Campos; Referee: Berthier

9 March 1917 6	RS Gimnástica	0–9	Madrid FC	Madrid
		Report	Bernabéu (?); Alvárez (?); J. Petit (?); De Miguel (?); Muguiro (?)	Stadium: Gimnástica; Referee: Mister Miller

=== Copa del Rey ===
==== Quarterfinals ====
11 March 1917 First leg	Madrid FC	8–1	Sevilla FC	Madrid
	Álvarez 5'; Bernabéu (?); Aranguren (?); Sansinenea (?); Petit (?)	Report	Spencer (?)	Stadium: Campo de O'Donnell; Referee: (Spain) Larrañaga

18 March 1917 Second leg	Sevilla FC	2–1	Madrid FC	Seville
	Spencer 33', 75'	Report	Bernabéu (?)	Stadium: Campo del Mercantil; Referee: (England) Miller

19 March 1917 Replay	Sevilla FC	0–4	Madrid FC	Seville
		Report	Álvarez (?); Petit (?); Bernabéu (?); Sansinenea (?)	Stadium: Campo del Mercantil; Referee: (England) Miller

==== Semifinals ====
1 April 1917 First leg	Madrid FC	4–1	España FC	Madrid
	J. Petit 5'; Bernabéu (?); Antonio (?)	Report	Bellavista (?)	Stadium: Campo de O'Donnell; Referee: (Spain) Torrens

8 April 1917 Second leg	España FC	3–1	Madrid FC	Barcelona
	Cruella 33'; Segarra (?); Plaza 63'	Report	Saura 40'	Stadium: Camp del Carrer Entença; Referee: (Spain) Julián Ruete

10 April 1917 First replay	España FC	2–2 (a.e.t.)	Madrid FC	Barcelona
	Raich (?); Prat 115' (pen.)	Report	Saura 12'; Sansinenea 100'	Stadium: Camp del Carrer Entença; Referee: (Spain) Torrens

29 April 1917 Second replay	España FC	0–1	Madrid FC	Barcelona
		Report	Sansinenea (?)	Stadium: Camp del Carrer Entença; Referee: (Spain) R. Arzuaga

==== Final ====
13 May 1917 Final	Madrid FC	0–0 (a.e.t.)	Arenas Getxo	Barcelona
		Report		Stadium: Camp de la Indústria; Referee: (Spain) Francisco Bru

15 May 1917 Replay	Madrid FC	2–1 (a.e.t.)	Arenas Getxo	Barcelona
	Petit 75'; Álvarez 113'	Report	Suárez 15'	Stadium: Camp de la Indústria; Referee: (Spain) Francisco Bru
