= Eduardo Teus =

Filipino footballer

Personal information
- Full name: Eduardo Teus López-Navarro
- Date of birth: 6 November 1896
- Place of birth: Manila, Captaincy General of the Philippines
- Date of death: 8 October 1958 (61 years)
- Place of death: Bilbao, Spain
- Height: 1.85 m (6 ft 1 in)
- Position: Goalkeeper

Youth career
- 1913–1915: Madrid FC

Senior career*
Years	Team	Apps	(Gls)
1915–1919	Madrid FC	26	(0)

Managerial career
- 1941–1942: Spain
- * Club domestic league appearances and goals

Eduardo Teus López-Navarro, (6 November 1896 – 8 October 1958) was a Filipino football goalkeeper, journalist and manager based in Spain. He was mostly known for being the first Filipino footballer to have played for Real Madrid and for being an important sportswriter for the Spanish press in the first half of the 20th century, as well as for managing the Spain national football team from 1941 to 1942.

== Early life and education ==
Teus was born in Manila, Philippines on 6 November 1896 to a Filipino family of native and Spanish origins. With the Spanish–American War going on, his family moved away from the country to settle in Spain. He was sent by his parents in England to study at the St Joseph's College in London where he first learned about football. He then returned to Spain in 1913 and, at 17, entered the youth teams of Madrid FC playing as a midfielder and forward whilst pursuing a faculty in Law.

== Playing career ==
He debuted in the first team, as an outfield player, on 19 September 1915 against Stadium FC in a friendly won 6–1 at the Campo de O'Donnell in Madrid. While he was preferred over in his position, at the time, in the 1915-16 Campeonato Regional Centro he was instead played in the friendlies when, on 25 December, he received a hit right by his heart from a Sporting CP player that left him out of the field for two months. He returned on 7 March 1916 at the Camp de la Indústria, in a friendly against FC Barcelona, for the first time as a goalkeeper thanks to a decision made by Santiago Bernabéu, captain of the team, who chose him over Pablo Lemmel for a little misconduct following the 3–0 defeat suffered by the same team few days before. Apart from being his first Clásico, his first performance at the post kept the score level at 0-0 and from there he made the goalkeeper role his primary function. Teus played his first official match, once again, against Barcelona in the semifinal series of the 1916 Copa del Rey, famed for being one of the sparks that ignited the rivalry between the two clubs. In the first leg on 26 March, he suffered a come-back led by Paulino Alcántara and Vicente Martínez after Madrid took the lead with Juan José Petit thus, his official debut, resulting in a loss. After not playing a part in the second leg and in the first tie-breaker, he returned for the second replay where Madrid defeated Barça 4–2 to progress into the national cup final. Madrid's access to the final, held in Barcelona, was contested by the Catalans who recriminated José Berraondo's refereeing and the decision of having both the replays held in Madrid. The Madridistas were awaited by a rough welcoming and the final ended in a 4–0 loss against Athletic Bilbao, then faulted by the former who believed that the first two goals were in offside. To end the season, Teus took part in the Copa Espuñes to play in his first Madrid derby and against Racing de Madrid but losing both times. In his first season Teus played a total of 12 games, 7 of them as goalie and recorded his only cleansheet in his debut (3 were official matches).

With Lemmel's exit, Teus shared his spot with Enrique Bertrán de Lis but for the most part, was involved more in the starting team throughout the campaign. After the friendlies in the preseason, he made his first appearance in the Campeonato Regional Centro on 5 November 1916 with a 3-2 success over Athletic de Madrid and obtained his first official clean sheet, again versus the former, on 23 January 1917 in a 3–0 victory. Won his second regional title, of which he missed the last game, he then missed the quarterfinals of the 1917 Copa del Rey but returned in the four games of the semis against España de Barcelona and reached the final after beating them 1–0 in the second replay on 8 April. Just like the season before, the series was surrounded by polemics and, with the final held in Barcelona, the Madrid's directors opted playing the final in Vigo, a decision also approved by the other finalist Arenas Club. The Madrid players, however, refused to take the trip to not give any advantage to the Vigo-based team and got the validation despite a still hesitant board. Teus wrote a manifesto, the catalyst for what became his career later, which Madrid then published in the Catalan press to ease the tensions among the public and ask them to remain neutral. In the meantime Madrid and Barcelona played for the Copa Foronda, a non official trophy, which Teus won on 23 April. Teus played both games in the 1917 Copa del Rey final and won it in the replay 2–1 on 15 May, after the 0–0 draw two days prior, in extratime thanks to the goals of René Petit and Ricardo Álvarez. He made his last appearance for the season in the match won 1–0 against Athletic de Madrid in an attempt to win as well the Copas Espuñes y Maura but did not play in the final when his team fell short against Racing de Madrid on 20 May.

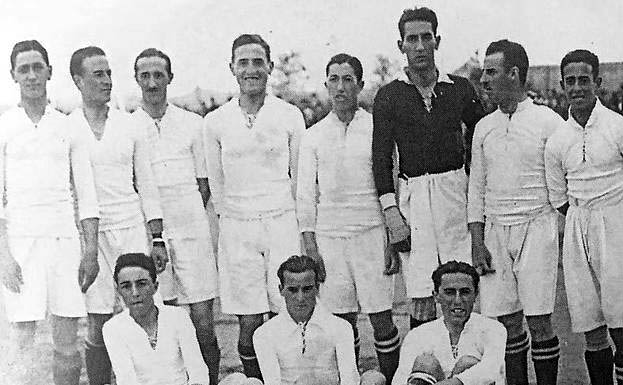
Eduardo Teus, standing third from left, posing with his teammates before the 1918 Copa del Rey final.

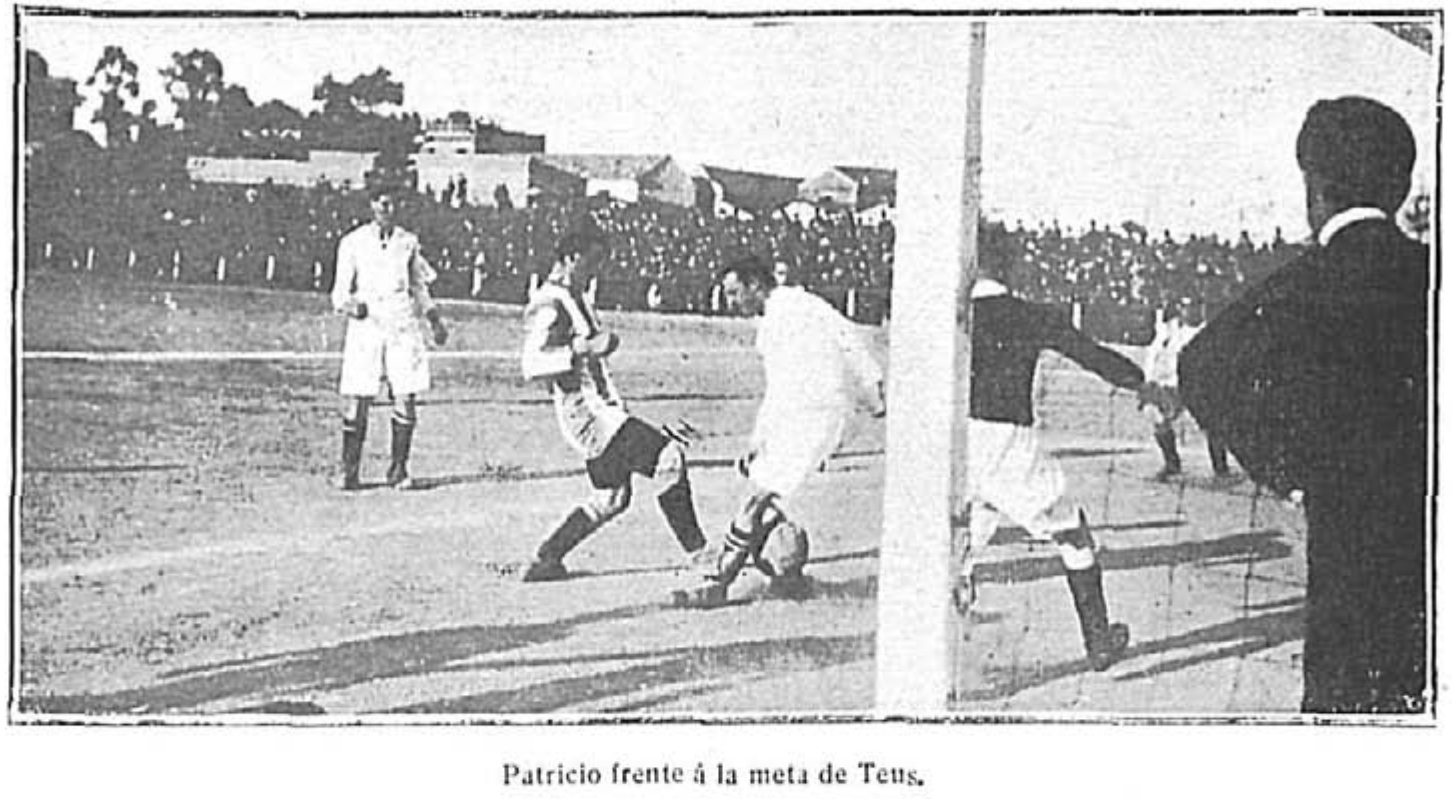
Teus guarding the net in an attacking play carried by Real Unión's Patricio Arabolaza in the final.

The following season in the 1917-18 Campeonato Regional Centro, after missing the second half of 1917, Teus played his first game on 3 February 1918 in the 5–2 victory against Stadium FC and began his third season for Madrid. He played in the crucial game against Atleti won 3-1 and earned his first clean sheet of the season thanks to the 1–0 win over Racing de Madrid. With his third championship secured, Madrid found RCD Español in the quarter finals of the cup and with both having won a game a piece, 3-0 for the Periquitos and 1-0 for Madrid, Teus' team prevailed with a 2–1 score in the tie breaker on 26 April by coming back from one goal down. Attended by Recreativo de Huelva in the semifinals, Teus' team made the trip to Huelva, defeating them 2-0 and back in Madrid at the Atleti's O'Donnell by 4–0, recording two consecutive clean sheets. On 12 May, in the 1918 Copa del Rey final the meeting was against Real Unión at Madrid's home at the O'Donnell where he played his third consecutive final but only had a glance of the trophy as it was the visitors who lifted the cup after getting past him with 2 goals. The first goal came in from a shot Teus believed he blocked on the line and, with the assistant referee signalating the goal, he approached him to protest the decision with his teammates when, unaware that Josep Torrens did't stop the play, Juan Legarreta scored in the confusion to confirm the goal.

Teus played his final season with Madrid, stacking up 7 more appearances for the club. In the 1918–19 Campeonato Regional Centro he played his last 3 official matches and recorded one cleansheet on 24 November 1918 against Athletic de Madrid. His last game was on 26 January 1919 in a 4-1 losing effort to Racing de Madrid, eventual champions of the region. In a season troubled by injuries, among them on a meniscus not treated, at only 22 years old he hung up his boots and gloves. For Madrid he played a total of 61 games, 26 of them officially, winning three straight regional championships and played in three straight Copa del Rey finals winning the 17th edition of the tournament.

== Post-football career ==
He later became a successful sports journalist and was later tasked by Francisco Franco to manage the Spain national football team as head coach. He managed the national team from 1941 to 1942, playing a total of six international games, of which he won three, and lost only one and drew two.

In 1958, Teus died of a stroke while watching a game at the press box of the San Mamés Stadium in Bilbao in Spain.

== Career statistics ==
Appearances and goals conceded, season and competition
Club	Season	Regional			Copa del Rey		Total (official)		Copa Espuñes		Copa Foronda		Friendly		Total (non official)		Total	
Club	Season	Division	Apps	Goals	Apps	Goals	Apps	Goals	Apps	Goals	Apps	Goals	Apps	Goals	Apps	Goals	Apps	Goals
Madrid FC	1915-16	Campeonato Regional Centro	0	0	3	-8	3	-8	2	-4	—		2+5^{(1)}	-2	4+5^{(1)}	-6	7+5^{(1)}	-14
Madrid FC	1916-17	Campeonato Regional Centro	5	-8	6	-7	11	-15	1	0	2	-1	12+1^{(1)}	-9	15+1^{(1)}	-10	26+1^{(1)}	-25
Madrid FC	1917-18	Campeonato Regional Centro	3	-4	6	-6	9	-10	—		—		6	-8	6	-8	15	-18
Madrid FC	1918-19	Campeonato Regional Centro	3	-2	Did not qualify		3	-2	—		—		3+1^{(1)}	-5	3+1^{(1)}	-5	6+1^{(1)}	-7
Career total			11	-14	15	-21	26	-35	3	-4	2	-1	23+7^{(1)}	-24	28+7^{(1)}	-29	54+7^{(1)}	-64
^{(1)} Games played as an outfield player. Cleansheets: Official: 10 in 26 games (1 in 1915-16; 3 in 1916-17; 5 in 1917-18; 1 in 1918-19).; Non official: 11 in 28 games (2 in 1915-16; 7 in 1916-17; 2 in 1918-19).; Total: 21 in 54 games.

== Honours ==
- Copa del Rey: (1) 1917
- Campeonato Regional Centro: (3) 1915–16, 1916–17, 1917–18
