= 1917–18 Madrid FC season =

16th season in existence of Real Madrid CF

Madrid FC
1917–18 season
- President: Pedro Parages
- Manager: Arthur Johnson
- Stadium: Campo de O'Donnell
- Campeonato Regional Centro (Note: The Campeonato Regional Centro (Central Regional Championship) was a regional league used as a qualifier for the Copa del Rey.): 1st
- Copa del Rey: Runners-up
- Top goalscorer: League: Machimbarrena (~3); All: Santiago Bernabéu (6)
- Biggest win: Madrid FC 4–0 Recreativo de Huelva
- Biggest defeat: Athletic Madrid 4–1 Madrid FC; RCD Español 3–0 Madrid FC
Home colours	Away colours

The 1917–18 season was Madrid Football Club's 16th season in existence. The club played some friendly matches. They also played in the Campeonato Regional Centro (Central Regional Championship) and the Copa del Rey.

== Players ==
Note: Flags indicate national team as defined under FIFA eligibility rules; some limited exceptions apply. Players may hold more than one non-FIFA nationality.

No.	Pos.	Nation	Player
—	GK	ESP	Eduardo Teus
—	DF	ESP	Cordero
—	DF	ESP	Juan de Manzanedo
—	MF	ESP	José María Castell
—	MF	ESP	Feliciano Rey
—	MF	ESP	Alberto Machimbarrena
—	MF	ARG	Eulogio Aranguren
—	MF	ESP	Joaquín Caruncho

No.	Pos.	Nation	Player
—	MF	ESP	Juan Caballero
—	FW	ESP	Fernando Muguiro
—	FW	ESP	Ricardo Álvarez
—	FW	ESP	Juan Monjardín
—	FW	ESP	Antonio de Miguel
—	FW	ESP	Manuel Posada
—	FW	ESP	José María Sansinenea
—	FW	ESP	Santiago Bernabéu

== Friendlies ==
26 August 1917 Friendly	Madrid	2–4	Stadium	Madrid
		Report		Stadium: Campo de O'Donnell

2 September 1917 Friendly	Madrid	0–0	Unión SC	Madrid
		Report		Stadium: Campo de O'Donnell

9 September 1917 Friendly	Madrid	2–0	Cultural	Madrid
		Report		Stadium: Campo de O'Donnell

16 September 1917 Friendly	Madrid	2–1	Stadium	Madrid
	Caballero (?); Muñagorri (?)	Report	De Juana (?)	Stadium: Campo de O'Donnell; Referee: López García

23 September 1917 Friendly	Madrid	0–3	Unión SC	Madrid
		Report		Stadium: Campo de O'Donnell

22 October 1917 Friendly	Madrid	2–3	Athletic Bilbao	Madrid
	Sansinesea (?); Rey (?)	Report	Pichichi (?) ?? (?)	Stadium: Campo de O'Donnell; Referee: Ruete

30 October 1917 Friendly	Madrid	1–2	Fortuna de Vigo	Madrid
	Muguiro (?)	Report	Balbino (?); Posada (?)	Stadium: Campo de O'Donnell; Referee: Colina

1 November 1917 Friendly	Barcelona	3–0	Madrid	Barcelona
	Vinyals 15' (?); Sagi-Barba (?)	Report		Stadium: Camp de la Indústria; Referee: Femenías

4 November 1917 Friendly	Barcelona	4–1	Madrid	Barcelona
	Vinyals 15'; Hormeu (?); Sagi-Barba (?); Gumbau (?)	Report	Machimbarrena (?)	Stadium: Camp de la Indústria; Referee: Femenías

18 November 1917 Friendly	Madrid	1–1	Unión SC	Madrid
		Report		Stadium: Campo de O'Donnell

8 December 1917 Friendly	Madrid	1–0	Stadium	Madrid
	A. Bilbao (?)	Report		Stadium: Campo de O'Donnell

9 December 1917 Friendly	Madrid	3–0	Racing Madrid	Madrid
	Machimbarrena (?); Sansinenea 50', 85'	Report		Stadium: Campo de O'Donnell; Referee: Francisco Bru

16 December 1917 Friendly	Madrid	4–1	Sevilla	Madrid
	Sansinenea (?); San Miguel (?); Caballero (?)	Report	Spencer (?)	Stadium: Campo de O'Donnell; Referee: Colina

18 December 1917 Friendly	Madrid	3–3	Sevilla	Madrid
	Sansinenea (?); Machimbarrena (?); Álvarez (?)	Report	Ramos (?); Spencer (?) ?? (?)	Stadium: Campo de O'Donnell; Referee: López García

21 December 1917 Friendly	Madrid	2–0	Real Unión	Madrid
	Álvarez (?); Sansinenea (?)	Report		Stadium: Campo de O'Donnell; Referee: Montero

23 December 1917 Friendly	Madrid	1–5	Real Unión	Madrid
	Rey (?)	Report	Petit 5' (?) ?? 43'; Angoso (?)	Stadium: Campo de O'Donnell; Referee: Larrañaga

25 January 1918 Friendly	Madrid	1–3	Sporting de Gijón	Madrid
	Caballero 5'	Report	Villaverde 5' (?)	Stadium: Campo de O'Donnell; Referee: Hernández Coronado

11 February 1918 Friendly	Universidad Maria Cristina	3–1	Madrid FC	El Escorial
		Report		Stadium: Universidad

13 February 1918 Friendly	Madrid	7–1	Stadium	Madrid
		Report		Stadium: Campo de O'Donnell
Note: The friendly was held to raise funds for Stadium FC.

23 March 1918 Friendly	Madrid	2–1	Canadiense	Madrid
		Report		Stadium: Campo de O'Donnell

25 March 1918 Friendly	Madrid	4–2	Canadiense	Madrid
		Report		Stadium: Campo de O'Donnell

27 March 1918 Friendly	Madrid	5–1	Real Unión	Madrid
	Posada (?); Bernabéu (?)	Report	Emery (?)	Stadium: Campo de O'Donnell; Referee: Cárcer

30 March 1918 Friendly	Madrid	1–1	Real Unión	Madrid
	Bernabéu (?)	Report	Angoso (?)	Stadium: Campo de O'Donnell

17 May 1918 Friendly	Madrid	1–2	Barcelona	Madrid
	Bernabéu (?)	Report	Juliá 40'; Martínez (?)	Stadium: Campo de O'Donnell; Referee: Colina

19 May 1918 Friendly	Madrid	6–2	Racing Madrid	Madrid
	Bernabéu (?); Petit (?) ?? (?) ?? (?) ?? (?)	Report	Fortunato (?)	Stadium: Campo de O'Donnell; Referee: Coronado

26 May 1918 Friendly	Madrid	2–0	Racing Madrid	Madrid
		Report		Stadium: Campo de O'Donnell; Referee: Ordoño

30 May 1918 Friendly	Madrid	2–2	Real Sociedad	Madrid
	Caruncho (?); Azurza (?)	Report	García (?); Trimborn (?)	Stadium: Campo de O'Donnell; Referee: Colina

2 June 1918 Friendly	Madrid	0–2	Real Sociedad	Madrid
		Report		Stadium: Campo de O'Donnell; Referee: Ordoño

== Competitions ==
=== Overview ===
Competition	First match	Last match	Starting round	Final position	Record							
Competition	First match	Last match	Starting round	Final position	Pld	W	D	L	GF	GA	GD	Win %
Campeonato Regional Centro	11 November 1917	3 March 1918	Matchday 1	Winners	6	5	0	1	13	8	+5	83.33
Copa del Rey	8 April 1918	12 May 1918	Quarterfinals	Runners-up	6	4	0	2	9	7	+2	66.67
Total					12	9	0	3	22	15	+7	75.00

Source: Competitions

=== Campeonato Regional Centro ===
==== League table ====
Pos	Team	Pld	W	D	L	GF	GA	GD	Pts	Qualification or relegation
1	Madrid (C, Q)	6	5	0	1	13	8	+5	10	Qualification for the Copa del Rey.
2	Athletic Madrid	6	4	0	2	16	10	+6	8	
3	Racing Madrid	6	3	0	3	6	6	0	6	
4	Stadium (R)	6	0	0	6	8	19	−11	0	Qualification for the relegation play-offs

Source: Rec.Sport.Soccer Statistics Foundation
Rules for classification: 1) points; 2) goal difference; 3) number of goals scored.
(C) Champions; (Q) Qualified for the phase indicated; (R) Relegated

==== Matches ====
11 November 1917 1	Madrid	2–1	Stadium	Madrid
	De Miguel (?); Machimbarrena (?)	Report	Albéniz (?)	Stadium: Campo de O'Donnell; Referee: Rocamora

24 November 1917 2	Athletic Madrid	4–1	Madrid	Madrid
	Olalquiaga (?); Gomar (?)	Report	Machimbarrena (?)	Stadium: Campo de Vallecas; Referee: Torrens

2 December 1917 3	Madrid	1–0	Racing Madrid	Madrid
	Álvárez 85'	Report		Stadium: Campo de O'Donnell; Referee: Ruete

3 February 1918 4	Stadium	2–5	Madrid	Madrid
		Report		Stadium: Campo de O'Donnell; Referee: Ruete

24 February 1918 5	Madrid	3–1	Athletic Madrid	Madrid
	Machimbarrena (?); Bernabéu (?); Posada (?)	Report	Yáñez (?)	Stadium: Campo de O'Donnell; Referee: Montero

3 March 1918 6	Racing Madrid	0–1	Madrid	Madrid
		Report	Bernabéu (?)	Stadium: Martínez Campos; Referee: Torrens

=== Copa del Rey ===
==== Quarterfinals ====
8 April 1918 First leg	Español	3–0	Madrid	Barcelona
	Alvarado 3'; Gracia 30', 40'	Report		Stadium: Velódromo; Referee: Larrañaga

14 April 1918 Second leg	Madrid	1–0	Español	Madrid
	Bernabéu (?)	Report		Stadium: Campo de O'Donnell; Referee: Montero

16 April 1918 Replay	Madrid	2–1	Español	Madrid
	Posada 5'; Bernabéu 10'	Report	Gracia 40'	Stadium: Campo de O'Donnell; Referee: Larrañaga

==== Semifinals ====
21 April 1918 First leg	Recreativo de Huelva	1–2	Madrid	Huelva
		Report	Posada (?); Bernabéu (?)	Referee: Artola

28 April 1918 Second leg	Madrid	4–0	Recreativo de Huelva	Madrid
	Álvarez 40'; Posada (?); Bernabéu (?)	Report		Stadium: Campo de O'Donnell; Referee: Larrañaga

==== Final ====
12 May 1918 Final	Madrid	0–2	Real Unión	Madrid
17:00 CET		Report	Legarreta 45', 85'	Stadium: Campo de O'Donnell; Referee: Torrens
