= 1914–15 Madrid FC season =

13rd season in existence of Real Madrid CF

Madrid FC
1914–15 season
- President: Adolfo Meléndez
- Manager: Arthur Johnson
- Stadium: Campo de O'Donnell
- Campeonato Regional Centro (Note: The Campeonato Regional Centro (Central Regional Championship) was a regional league used as a qualifier for the Copa del Rey.): 2nd
- Top goalscorer: Santiago Bernabéu (4); René Petit (4)
- Biggest win: Madrid FC 3–2 Athletic Madrid
- Biggest defeat: RS Gimnástica 3–1 Madrid FC
Home colours	Away colours

The 1914–15 season was Madrid Football Club's 13th season in existence. The club played some friendly matches. They also played in the Campeonato Regional Centro (Central Regional Championship).

== Friendlies ==
25 October 1914 Friendly	RS Gimnástica	0–4	Madrid FC	Madrid
		Report		Stadium: Princesa

20 December 1914 Friendly	Madrid FC	2–3	Racing de Madrid	Madrid
	Petit; René Petit	Report	Rey; Mata; Álvarez	Stadium: Campo de O'Donnell; Referee: Juantorena

25 December 1914 Friendly	Madrid FC	2–1	RCD Español	Madrid
	René Petit; Juan Petit	Report	Armet	Stadium: Campo de O'Donnell; Referee: Menéndez

27 December 1914 Friendly	Madrid FC	1–2	RCD Español	Madrid
	René Petit	Report	López	Stadium: Campo de O'Donnell; Referee: Ovejero

2 January 1915 Friendly	Madrid FC (Spain)	4–5	(Portugal) S.L. Benfica	Madrid, Spain
	Belaúnde; Juan Petit; Castell; Juan Petit	Report	Oliveira; Peres; Oliveira; Velhoso; H. dos Santos	Stadium: Campo de O'Donnell; Referee: Meléndez

3 January 1915 Friendly	Madrid FC (Spain)	1–4	(Portugal) S.L. Benfica	Madrid, Spain
	R. Uribarri	Report	Oliveira; H. dos Santos; Peres ?	Stadium: Campo de O'Donnell; Referee: Lemmel

7 March 1915 Friendly	Racing de Madrid	0–1	Madrid FC	Madrid
		Report	Santiago Bernabéu	Stadium: Martínez Campos; Referee: Sócrates Quintana

6 April 1915 Friendly	Madrid FC	1–6	Arenas Getxo	Madrid
	René Petit	Report	Pagaza; Castell (o.g.); Pagaza; Barturen; Menéndez	Stadium: Campo de O'Donnell; Referee: Juantorena

8 April 1915 Friendly	Madrid FC	3–3	Athletic Madrid	Madrid
	R. Petit; J. Petit; S. Bernabéu	Report	Villaverde; Cárcer (o.g.); Pagaza	Stadium: Campo de O'Donnell; Referee: Pelous

18 April 1915 Friendly	Madrid FC	4–1	Racing de Madrid	Madrid
	S. Bernabéu (pen.); René Petit; Pascual (o.g.); S. Bernabéu	Report	?	Stadium: Campo de O'Donnell; Referee: Pisón

== Competitions ==
=== Overview ===
Competition	First match	Last match	Starting round	Final position	Record							
Competition	First match	Last match	Starting round	Final position	Pld	W	D	L	GF	GA	GD	Win %
Campeonato Regional Centro	15 November 1914	31 January 1915	Matchday 1	2nd	6	2	3	1	10	9	+1	33.33
Total					6	2	3	1	10	9	+1	33.33

Source: Competitions

=== Campeonato Regional Centro ===
==== League table ====
Pos	Team	Pld	W	D	L	GF	GA	GD	Pts	Qualification
1	Racing Madrid (C)	6	3	2	1	13	6	+7	8	
2	Madrid	6	2	3	1	10	9	+1	7	
3	RS Gimnástica (Q)	6	2	2	2	13	10	+3	6	Qualified for the Copa del Rey. (Note: RFEF regulations did not permit Racing de Madrid to participate in the Copa del Rey. RS Gimnástica was selected to represent the Community of Madrid in the Copa del Rey by the Federation, despite Madrid FC finishing higher.)
4	Athletic Madrid	6	1	1	4	6	17	−11	3	

Source: Rec.Sport.Soccer Statistics Foundation
Rules for classification: 1) points; 2) goal difference; 3) number of goals scored.
(C) Champions; (Q) Qualified for the phase indicated

==== Matches ====
15 November 1914 1	RS Gimnástica	3–1	Madrid FC	Madrid
	Peyró 25'; Castellví 40' ?? (?)		Petit (?)	Stadium: Campo de Princesa; Referee: J. Pérez

29 November 1914 2	Madrid FC	3–2	Athletic Madrid	Madrid
	Petit 8' (?); J. Petit (?)		Belaunde (?); Garnica (?)	Stadium: Campo de O'Donnell; Referee: Quintana

20 December 1914 3	Racing de Madrid	3–2	Madrid FC	Madrid
			J. Petit (?); Bernabéu (?)	Stadium: Campo de O'Donnell; Referee: Juan Torena

10 January 1915 4	Madrid FC	1–1	Racing de Madrid	Madrid
	Bernabéu (?)		De Miguel 47'	Stadium: Campo de O'Donnell; Referee: Ruete

17 January 1915 5	Athletic Madrid	2–2	Madrid FC	Madrid
	Villaverde (?); Belaunde (?)		Bernabéu (?), 57'	Stadium: Campo de Vallecas; Referee: Pelous

31 January 1915 6	Madrid FC	1–1	RS Gimnástica	Madrid
	Petit (?)		Kindelán (?)	Stadium: Campo de O'Donnell; Referee: Pelous
