= 1915–16 Madrid FC season =

Madrid FC
1915–16 season
- President: Adolfo Meléndez
- Manager: Arthur Johnson
- Stadium: Campo de O'Donnell
- Campeonato Regional Centro (Note: The Campeonato Regional Centro (Central Regional Championship) was a regional league used as a qualifier for the Copa del Rey.): 1st
- Copa del Rey: Runners-up
- Top goalscorer: League: Santiago Bernabéu; René Petit; Montenegro (4); All: Santiago Bernabéu (12)
- Biggest win: Madrid FC 4–0 Racing de Madrid
- Biggest defeat: Athletic Bilbao 4–0 Madrid FC
Home colours	Away colours

The 1915–16 season was Madrid Football Club's 14th season. The club played some friendly matches. They also played in the Campeonato Regional Centro (Central Regional Championship) and the Copa del Rey, winning the former and losing the final to Athletic Bilbao in the latter.

== Players ==
Note: Flags indicate national team as defined under FIFA eligibility rules; some limited exceptions apply. Players may hold more than one non-FIFA nationality.

No.	Pos.	Nation	Player
—	GK	ESP	Eduardo Teus
—	GK	ESP	Pablo Lemmel Malo de Molina
—	DF	ESP	José Antonio Erice
—	DF	ESP	José Ladislao Irureta
—	DF	ESP	Julio Gómez de la Serna
—	MF	ESP	José María Castell
—	MF	FRA	René Petit
—	MF	ESP	Antonio Sicilia Mendo

No.	Pos.	Nation	Player
—	MF	ARG	Eulogio Aranguren
—	MF	ARG	Sotero Aranguren
—	FW	ESP	Zabalo
—	FW	ESP	Arturo López Espinosa
—	FW	ESP	Manuel Pérez
—	FW	ESP	Luis Belaunde
—	FW	FRA	Juan José Petit
—	FW	ESP	Casanova
—	FW	ESP	Santiago Bernabéu

== Friendlies ==
11 September 1915 Friendly	Recreativo de Huelva	2–2	Madrid FC	Huelva
		Report		Stadium: Velódromo; Referee: Tellechea

12 September 1915 Friendly	Recreativo de Huelva	3–1	Madrid FC	Huelva
	Iñíguez; Navarro; A. Mata	Report	?	Stadium: Velódromo; Referee: (England) McKensie

19 September 1915 Friendly	Madrid FC	6–1	Stadium FC	Madrid
	? René Petit ? 90'	Report	Acebo	Stadium: Campo de O'Donnell; Referee: Colomina

24 September 1915 Friendly	Arenas Getxo	4–1	Madrid FC	Getxo
	Barturen; Goyoaga ?	Report	René Petit	Stadium: Jolaseta; Referee: Serrano

26 September 1915 Friendly	Arenas Getxo	3–1	Madrid FC	Getxo
	Muñoz; Barturen; Muñoz	Report	René Petit	Stadium: Jolaseta

10 October 1915 Friendly	Madrid FC	2–1	Athletic Club de Madrid	Madrid
	Bilbao; Rivas	Report	Pagaza	Stadium: Campo de O'Donnell; Referee: Rocamora

17 October 1915 Friendly	Madrid FC	1–2	Racing de Madrid	Madrid
	E. Aranguren	Report	Aguirre (pen.); Martínez	Stadium: Campo de O'Donnell; Referee: Goicoechea

19 October 1915 Friendly	Madrid FC	4–2	Sporting de Gijón	Madrid
	S. Aranguren; S. Bernabéu	Report	S. Villaverde; Felgueroso	Stadium: Campo de O'Donnell; Referee: Ruete

31 October 1915 Friendly	Madrid FC	9–1	Sevilla FC	Madrid
		Report		Stadium: Campo de O'Donnell

1 November 1915 Friendly	Madrid FC	10–0	Sevilla FC	Madrid
		Report		Stadium: Campo de O'Donnell

12 December 1915 Friendly	Madrid FC	0–2	Racing de Madrid	Madrid
	? (o.g.)	Report	De Miguel	Stadium: Campo de O'Donnell; Referee: Berthier

19 December 1915 Friendly	Madrid FC	9–1	Recreativo de Huelva	Madrid
	Santiago Bernabéu; S. Aranguren; Rodríguez Eguinoa; Irureta; Sicilia	Report	?	Stadium: Campo de O'Donnell; Referee: Lamberto Matiflan

21 December 1915 Friendly	Madrid FC	5–0	Recreativo de Huelva	Madrid
	Espinosa ? ? S. Bernabéu; S. Aranguren	Report		Stadium: Campo de O'Donnell; Referee: Rocamora

25 December 1915 Friendly	Madrid FC (Spain)	1–2	(Portugal) Sporting CP	Madrid, Spain
	René Petit	Report	Erice (o.g.); Gonçalves	Stadium: Campo de O'Donnell; Referee: Montero

28 December 1915 Friendly	Madrid FC (Spain)	1–1	(Portugal) Sporting CP	Madrid, Spain
	S. Bernabéu	Report	Stromp	Stadium: Campo de O'Donnell; Referee: Berthier

1 January 1916 Friendly	Madrid FC	2–2	CE Sabadell FC	Madrid
	Fíguls (o.g.); S. Bernabéu	Report	Monistrol; Segarra	Stadium: Campo de O'Donnell; Referee: Berthier

2 January 1916 Friendly	Madrid FC	6–0	CE Sabadell FC	Madrid
	J. Petit; René Petit; Rodríguez	Report		Stadium: Campo de O'Donnell; Referee: Menéndez

8 January 1916 Friendly	Madrid FC (Spain)	0–1	(Switzerland) Montriond Sport	Madrid, Spain
		Report	Inebritt	Stadium: Campo de O'Donnell; Referee: Menéndez-Rocamora

10 January 1916 Friendly	Madrid FC (Spain)	1–4	(Switzerland) Montriond Sport	Madrid, Spain
	S. Bernabéu	Report	Millenet; Mayer; Stadler ?	Stadium: Campo de O'Donnell; Referee: Pomes

5 March 1916 Friendly	FC Barcelona	3–0	Madrid FC	Barcelona
		Report		Stadium: Camp de la Indústria; Referee: Forns

7 March 1916 Friendly	FC Barcelona	0–0	Madrid FC	Barcelona
		Report		Stadium: Camp de la Indústria; Referee: Bru

14 March 1916 Friendly	Madrid FC	1–2	Arenas Getxo	Madrid
	S. Bernabéu (pen.)	Report	Uriarte; Barturen (pen.)	Stadium: Campo de O'Donnell; Referee: Schüller

22 April 1916 Friendly	Madrid FC	1–1	RCD Español	Madrid
	Santiago Bernabéu	Report	Usubiaga	Stadium: Campo de O'Donnell; Referee: Carcer

23 April 1916 Friendly	Madrid FC	0–2	RCD Español	Madrid
		Report	González; Vergés	Stadium: Campo de O'Donnell; Referee: Carcer

28 April 1916 Friendly	Madrid FC (Spain)	2–1	(Switzerland) BSC Young Boys	Madrid, Spain
	Machimbarrena 40' (pen.); Espinosa 85'	Report	Würthich 25'	Stadium: Campo de O'Donnell; Referee: Menéndez

=== Copa Espuñes ===
27 February 1916 Copa Espuñes	Madrid FC	1–4	Athletic Club de Madrid	Madrid
	Montenegro 1'	Report	Uribarri 2', (?), (?); Villaverde	Stadium: Campo de O'Donnell; Referee: Montero

30 April 1916 Copa Espuñes	Madrid FC	4–2	Racing de Madrid	Madrid
		Report		Stadium: Campo de O'Donnell; Referee: Juantorena

21 May 1916 Copa Espuñes	Athletic Club de Madrid	3–2	Madrid FC	Madrid
	Montenegro 1'	Report	Uribarri 2', (?), (?); Villaverde	Stadium: Vallecas; Referee: Montero

4 June 1916 Copa Espuñes	Racing de Madrid	1–0	Madrid FC	Madrid
	Montenegro 1'	Report	Uribarri 2', (?), (?); Villaverde	Referee: Yarza

== Competitions ==
=== Overview ===
Competition	First match	Last match	Starting round	Final position	Record							
Competition	First match	Last match	Starting round	Final position	Pld	W	D	L	GF	GA	GD	Win %
Campeonato Regional Centro	7 November 1915	20 February 1916	Matchday 1	Winners	6	5	0	1	15	5	+10	83.33
Copa del Rey	16 January 1916	7 May 1916	Semi-finals	Runners-up	5	2	1	2	14	15	−1	40.00
Total					11	7	1	3	29	20	+9	63.64

Source: Competitions

=== Campeonato Regional Centro ===
==== League table ====
Pos	Team	Pld	W	D	L	GF	GA	GD	Pts	Qualification
1	Madrid (C, Q)	6	5	0	1	15	5	+10	10	Qualification for the Copa del Rey.
2	Racing Madrid	6	4	0	2	15	7	+8	8	
3	Athletic Madrid	6	3	0	3	11	8	+3	6	
4	RS Gimnástica	6	0	0	6	1	22	−21	0	

Source: Rec.Sport.Soccer Statistics Foundation
Rules for classification: 1) points; 2) goal difference; 3) number of goals scored.
(C) Champions; (Q) Qualified for the phase indicated

==== Matches ====
7 November 1915 1	Madrid FC	4–0	Racing de Madrid	Madrid
	Bernabéu (?); Petit (?)	Report		Stadium: Campo de O'Donnell; Referee: Ruete

21 November 1915 2	Madrid FC	2–0	RS Gimnástica	Madrid
	Petit (?); Bernabéu (?)	Report		Stadium: Campo de O'Donnell; Referee: Montero

16 January 1916 3	Racing de Madrid	2–0	Madrid FC	Madrid
	De Miguel (?); Larrañaga (?)	Report		Stadium: Martínez Campos; Referee: Ruete

30 January 1916 4	RS Gimnástica	1–4	Madrid FC	Madrid
	Molleda (?)	Report	Montenegro (?); Petit (?)	Stadium: Gimnástica; Referee: S. Quintana

6 February 1915 5	Madrid FC	2–0	Athletic Madrid	Madrid
	Montenegro (?); Bernabéu (?)	Report	Belaunde (?); Garnica (?)	Stadium: Campo de O'Donnell; Referee: Ezequiel Montero

20 February 1916 6	Athletic Madrid	2–3	Madrid FC	Madrid
	Uribarri; Eguidazu	Report	Petit 4'; Bernabéu 48'; Montenegro 88'	Stadium: Campo de Vallecas; Referee: Berthier
Note: The match had been postponed on 28 November. A member of the public attempted to attack the referee Berthier, an RS Gimnástica player, at the end of the match.

=== Copa del Rey ===
==== Semifinals ====
26 March 1916 First leg	FC Barcelona	2–0	Madrid FC	Barcelona
	Alcántara 39'; Martínez (?)	Report	Bernabéu (?)	Stadium: Camp del carrer Muntaner; Referee: Aguirreche

2 April 1916 Second leg	Madrid FC	4–1	FC Barcelona	Madrid
	Bernabéu 35' (pen.), 40', 60'; J. Petit 80'	Report	Martínez 20'	Stadium: Campo de O'Donnell; Referee: Montero

13 April 1916 First replay	Madrid FC	6–6 (a.e.t.)	FC Barcelona	Madrid
	Belaunde 2', 13', 87'; Bernabéu (?), 118' (pen.)	Report	Alcántara (?), 106'; Bau (?); Mallorquí 70'; Martínez 115'	Stadium: Campo de O'Donnell; Referee: Berraondo

15 April 1916 Second replay	Madrid FC	4–2 (a.e.t.)	FC Barcelona	Madrid
	Bernabéu (?); Zabala (?); S. Aranguren (?), 108'	Report	Martínez (?)	Stadium: Campo de O'Donnell; Referee: Berraondo

==== Final ====
7 May 1916 Final	Athletic Bilbao	4–0	Madrid FC	Barcelona
	Acedo 12'; Zubizarreta 23', 60', 69'	Report		Stadium: Camp de la Indústria; Referee: Paco Bru
