= Miguel Léibar =

Spanish priest, educator, and sportsperson

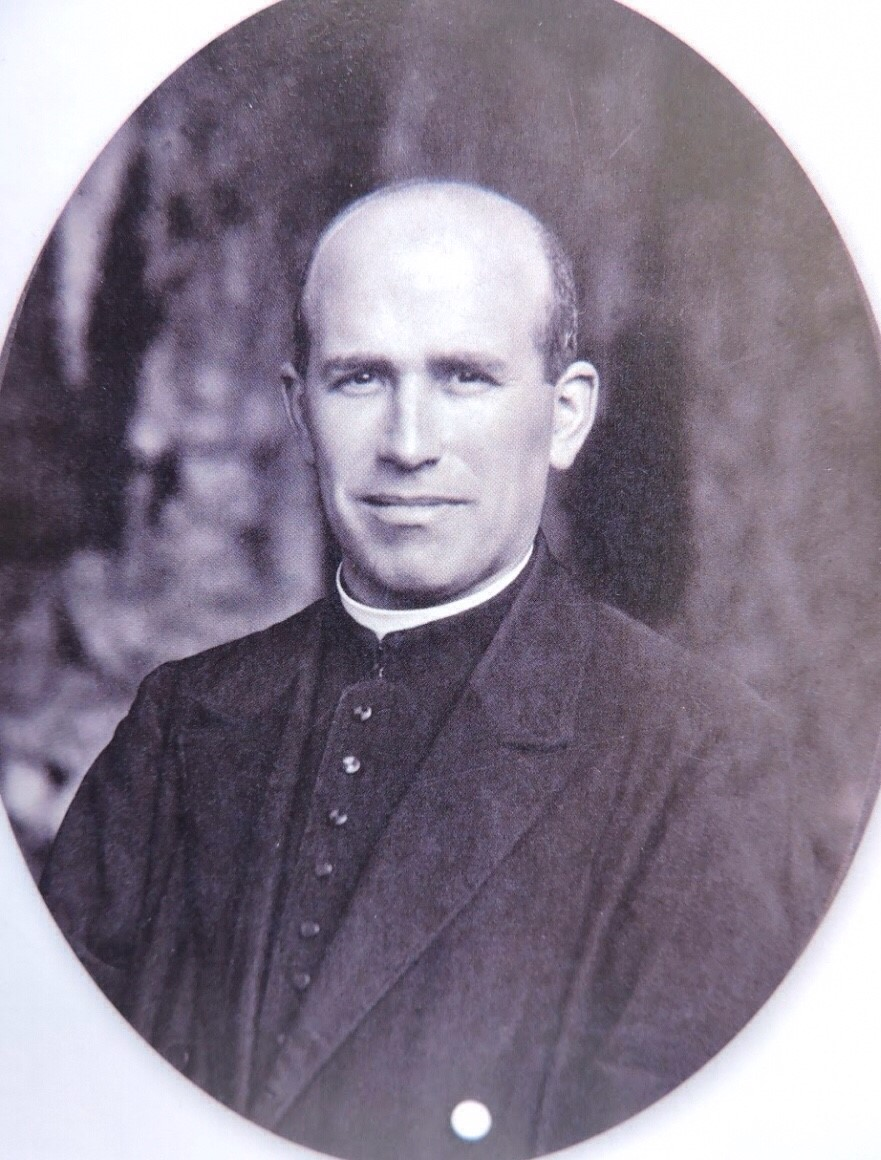
- Born: Miguel Léibar Garay; 17 February 1885; Aretxabaleta, Gipuzkoa, Spain
- Died: 28 July 1936 (aged 51); Madrid, Spain
- Citizenship: Spanish
- Occupations: Priest; Educator; Sportsperson; Martyr
- Known for: Founder of Pilar FC and martyr

Miguel Léibar Garay (17 February 1885 – 28 July 1936) was a Spanish priest, educator, and sportsperson, who founded Pilar FC, the school football team of Colegio del Pilar in 1911. After dying as a martyr in the Spanish Civil War, he was beatified in Rome in 2007.

== Early life and education ==
Born in Gipuzkoan valley of Aretxabaleta on 17 February 1885, Léibar was baptized two days after his birth. The families of the valley were deeply Catholic and very close to the Marianists, so many of their children entered the Marianist Postulancy of Eskoriatza, such as Léibar in 1898, at the age of 13, where he received a solid formation for four years, standing out for his simplicity, family spirit, and strong religious convictions. On 24 March 1903, he took his first religious vows at the Society of María en Vitoria, and then returned to Eskoriatza to continue his formation for two years. He was always available to go wherever his superiors wanted, whether it was America, Japan, or China, and between 1905 and 1912, he taught at the schools of his Congregation in Madrid and Vitoria.

Léibar had his first contact with the Colegio del Pilar in the 1908–09 academic year, aged 23, when he moved to Madrid to study at the Complutense University of Madrid, where he graduated with a degree in Philosophy and Letters. While in the Spanish capital, he met Carlos Eraña and Fidel Fuidio, who also died a martyr in the Civil War.

== Sporting career ==
In the following year, in early 1912, Léibar founded the Pilar FootBall Club, the school's football team, which went on to become the cradle for several great players, most of whom ended up joining Real Madrid, such as the Petit brothers (Juan and René), and José María Castell. In the 1912–13 academic year, Pilar played 16 matches, against the likes of Madrid, Atlético, La Concepción, Hispano-Francés, winning eleven, drawing one, and losing four.

== Career as a priest and educator ==
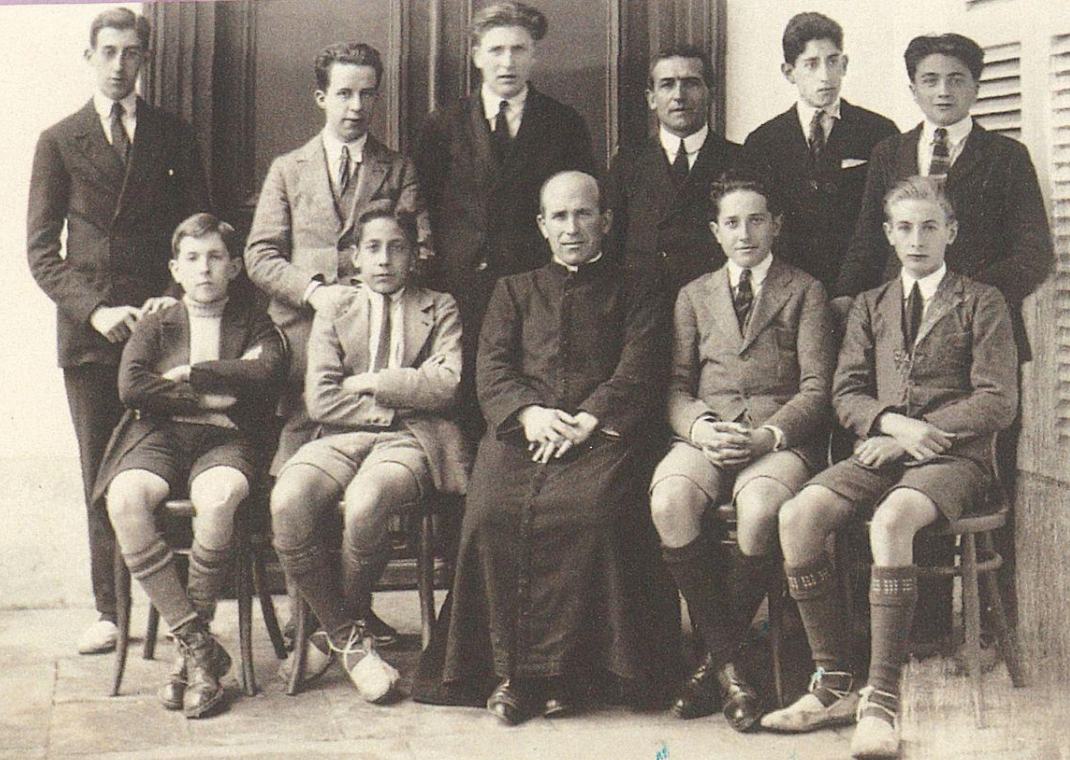
Miguel Léibar with a group of students from Vitoria in 1925

In July 1912, Léibar entered the seminary of Fribourg, Switzerland, where he not only studied theology, but also was ordained a priest on 1 August 1915. When he returned to Spain, he was assigned as a chaplain and teacher of primary and secondary education at the colleges of Cádiz (1915–22), Madrid (1922–23), and Vitoria (1923–25), as well as a director of the Marianist schools in Jerez de la Frontera and San Sebastián (1930).

He was known for his dedication as an apostle and was highly regarded as a confessor, being respected and loved by his students. Father Domingo Lázaro, who was director of Colegio del Pilar for several years, once compared him to a squirrel, because he was always walking from one place to another through the school's long corridors. As his confessor, Father Léibar assisted Lázaro in his last moments, an experience that deeply affected him.

== Later life and death ==
Despite the increase of religious persecution during the outbreak of the Spanish Civil War in July 1936, Léibar chose to remain in Madrid to protect both people and institutions from the growing threats. In the absence of the major superior, who went on to live in a previously assigned place of refuge, Léibar took on the responsibility of overseeing the religious members of the city's institute, settling at the Congregation's residence on Velázquez Street, but on 28 July, just ten days after the start of the War, the militia broke into the apartment and threw all the furniture and documentation onto the street, where they lit a huge bonfire, and then arrested him, along with Melitón Díaz de Guereñu, the school's porter, and Fabiana Rentero, who was helping take care of the school's youngest pupils; the two men were then taken to Puente de Vallecas, where on the Madrid to Valencia highway, kilometer 7, they were executed by firing squad without any kind of trial on 28 July 1936, dying in each other's arms. Months earlier, foreseeing this outcome, Léibar wrote: "Before seeing Spain plunged into dishonor, I offer my life as a sacrifice. For God and for Spain".

Three other Marianist religious also lost their lives during the religious persecution of the 1930s, all of them being executed in Madrid on 14 September 1936. They were Joaquín Ochoa Salazar, Sabino Ayastuy Erraste, and Florencio Arnáiz Cejudo, and on 28 October 2007, all four of them, along with 494 other martyrs, were beatified in Rome by His Holiness Benedict XVI.

== See also ==
Martyrs of the Spanish Civil War
