= 1918–19 Madrid FC season =

17th season in existence of Real Madrid CF

Madrid FC
1918–19 season
- President: Pedro Parages
- Manager: Arthur Johnson
- Stadium: Campo de O'Donnell
- Campeonato Regional Centro (Note: The Campeonato Regional Centro (Central Regional Championship) was a regional league used as a qualifier for the Copa del Rey.): 2nd
- Top goalscorer: Santiago Bernabéu (9)
- Biggest win: Madrid FC 5–0 Athletic Madrid
- Biggest defeat: Madrid FC 2–6 Racing de Madrid
Home colours	Away colours

The 1918–19 season was Madrid Football Club's 17th season in existence. The club played some friendly matches. They also played in the Campeonato Regional Centro (Central Regional Championship).

== Friendlies ==
27 August 1918 Friendly	Madrid	6–0	Athletic Madrid	Madrid
	Muñagorri (?); San Miguel (?); Clavet (?); Castell (?)	Report		Stadium: Campo de O'Donnell

10 November 1918 Friendly	Madrid	3–0	Stadium	Madrid
	Bernabéu (?); Tovar (?)	Report		Stadium: Campo de O'Donnell; Referee: Llorente

8 December 1918 Friendly	Sporting de Gijón	3–0	Madrid	Gijón
	Palacios 15' (?); Riera (?)	Report		Stadium: El Molinón

10 December 1918 Friendly	Sporting de Gijón	2–0	Madrid	Gijón
	Embil (?); Villaverde (?)	Report		Stadium: El Molinón; Referee: Morán

15 December 1918 Friendly	Madrid	4–1	Unión SC	Madrid
		Report		Stadium: Campo de O'Donnell; Referee: Colina

26 December 1918 Friendly	Madrid	4–1	English United	Madrid
	Gomar (?); Bernabéu (?); Sunyé (?)	Report	Rolls (?)	Stadium: Campo de O'Donnell; Referee: Larrañaga
Note: English United was a Gibraltar-based club.

1 January 1919 Friendly	Madrid	4–0	RS Gimnástica	Madrid
	De Miguel (?); Sunyé (?); Muguiro (?)	Report		Stadium: Campo de O'Donnell

26 January 1919 Friendly	Madrid	0–1	RS Gimnástica	Madrid
		Report		Stadium: Campo de O'Donnell

1 February 1919 Friendly	Madrid	2–0	Alfonso XIII	Madrid
	Bernabéu (?)	Report		Stadium: Campo de O'Donnell; Referee: Tejada

3 February 1919 Friendly	Madrid	2–2	Alfonso XIII	Madrid
	Bernabéu (?); A. Bilbao (?)	Report	Zabala (?)	Stadium: Campo de O'Donnell; Referee: Ruete

5 March 1919 Friendly	Racing Madrid	3–3	Madrid	Madrid
		Report		Stadium: Salamanca

13 March 1919 Friendly	Racing Madrid	1–4	Madrid	Madrid
	Portugués (?)	Report	De Miguel (?); González (?); Posada (?)	Stadium: Salamanca; Referee: Ruete

17 March 1919 Friendly	Madrid	1–0	Europa	Madrid
	De Miguel (?)	Report		Stadium: Campo de O'Donnell; Referee: Rogelio

19 March 1919 Friendly	Madrid	1–5	Europa	Madrid
	Bernabéu (?)	Report	Sotillo (?); Pelaó (?); Alegre (?)	Stadium: Campo de O'Donnell; Referee: Colina

13 April 1919 Friendly	Universidad Maria Cristina	1–2	Madrid	El Escorial
	Nieto (?)	Report	Víctor (?); Bernabéu (?)	Stadium: Universidad

13 April 1919 Friendly	Madrid	3–2	Húsares Pavia	Madrid
		Report		Stadium: Campo de O'Donnell

20 April 1919 Friendly	Madrid	1–2	Racing Madrid	Madrid
		Report		Stadium: Campo de O'Donnell; Referee: Montero

27 April 1919 Friendly	Real Stadium	1–4	Madrid	Oviedo
	Cholo (?)	Report	De Miguel 2'; Bernabéu (?), 48'; De Miguel (?)	Stadium: Llamanique; Referee: Fantomas

29 April 1919 Friendly	Real Stadium	1–4	Madrid	Oviedo
	? (?)	Report	González (?); Víctor (?)	Stadium: Llamanique; Referee: Siero

4 May 1919 Friendly	Madrid	0–1	Racing Madrid	Madrid
		Report	Álvarez 85'	Stadium: Campo de O'Donnell

8 June 1919 Friendly	Madrid	2–2	Regimento Telégrafos	Madrid
		Report		Stadium: Campo de O'Donnell; Referee: Álvarez
Note: Regimento Telégrafos was a team of conscripts from the Telegraph Regiment, and finalists of the championship of military teams.

15 June 1919 Friendly	Madrid	2–2	Regimento Telégrafos	Madrid
	San Miguel (?); Bernabéu (?)	Report	González (?) ? (?)	Stadium: Campo de O'Donnell; Referee: Álvarez
Note: Regimento Telégrafos was a team of conscripts from the Telegraph Regiment, and finalists of the championship of military teams.

22 June 1919 Friendly	Madrid	6–2	Regimento Telégrafos	Madrid
	Bernabéu (?); Fajardo (?); Castell (?); Sansinesea (?)	Report	González (?); Posada (?)	Stadium: Campo de O'Donnell
Note: Regimento Telégrafos was a team of conscripts from the Telegraph Regiment, and finalists of the championship of military teams.

== Competitions ==
=== Overview ===
Competition	First match	Last match	Starting round	Final position	Record							
Competition	First match	Last match	Starting round	Final position	Pld	W	D	L	GF	GA	GD	Win %
Campeonato Regional Centro	3 November 1918	20 April 1919	Matchday 1	2nd	8	5	1	2	20	15	+5	62.50
Total					8	5	1	2	20	15	+5	62.50

Source: Competitions

=== Campeonato Regional Centro ===
==== League table ====
Pos	Team	Pld	W	D	L	GF	GA	GD	Pts	Qualification
1	Racing Madrid (C, Q)	8	7	1	0	36	5	+31	15	Qualification for the Copa del Rey.
2	Madrid	8	5	1	2	20	15	+5	11	
3	RS Gimnástica	8	2	3	3	10	13	−3	7	
4	Athletic Madrid	8	2	1	5	7	19	−12	5	
5	Unión SC	8	1	0	7	8	29	−21	2	Qualification for the relegation play-offs

Source: Rec.Sport.Soccer Statistics Foundation
Rules for classification: 1) points; 2) goal difference; 3) number of goals scored.
(C) Champions; (Q) Qualified for the phase indicated

==== Matches ====
3 November 1918 1	Madrid	2–6	Racing de Madrid	Madrid
	Bernabéu (?)	Report	Roselló (?); Alvarado (?); Montero (?); Sunyé (?)	Stadium: Campo de O'Donnell; Referee: Larrañaga

24 November 1918 2	Athletic Madrid	0–2	Madrid	Madrid
	Sáez 44'	Report	Bernabéu (?); Muguiro 75'	Stadium: Campo de Vallecas; Referee: Montero

22 December 1918 3	RS Gimnástica	1–1	Madrid	Madrid
	Costa (?)	Report	Bernabéu (?)	Stadium: Gimnástica; Referee: Larrañaga

29 December 1918 4	Madrid	2–1	Unión SC	Madrid
	Bernabéu (?); Castell (?)	Report	Arriaza (?)	Stadium: Campo de O'Donnell; Referee: Cárcer

26 January 1919 5	Racing Madrid	4–1	Madrid	Madrid
	R. Alvárez (?); J. Alvárez (?)	Report	Bernabéu (?)	Stadium: Martínez Campos; Referee: Ruete

9 February 1919 6	Madrid	2–0	RS Gimnástica	Madrid
	Posada (?)	Report		Stadium: Campo de O'Donnell

6 April 1919 7	Unión SC	3–5	Madrid	Madrid
	Cañas (?); Vernacci (o.g.); Serrano (?)	Report	Posada (?); Muguiro (?); Bernabéu (?)	Stadium: Unión; Referee: Larrañaga

20 April 1919 8	Madrid	5–0	Athletic Madrid	Madrid
	Mugiro (?); Posada (?); Bernabéu (?)	Report		Stadium: Campo de O'Donnell; Referee: Montero
