= Juan Manzanedo =

Spanish footballer and manager

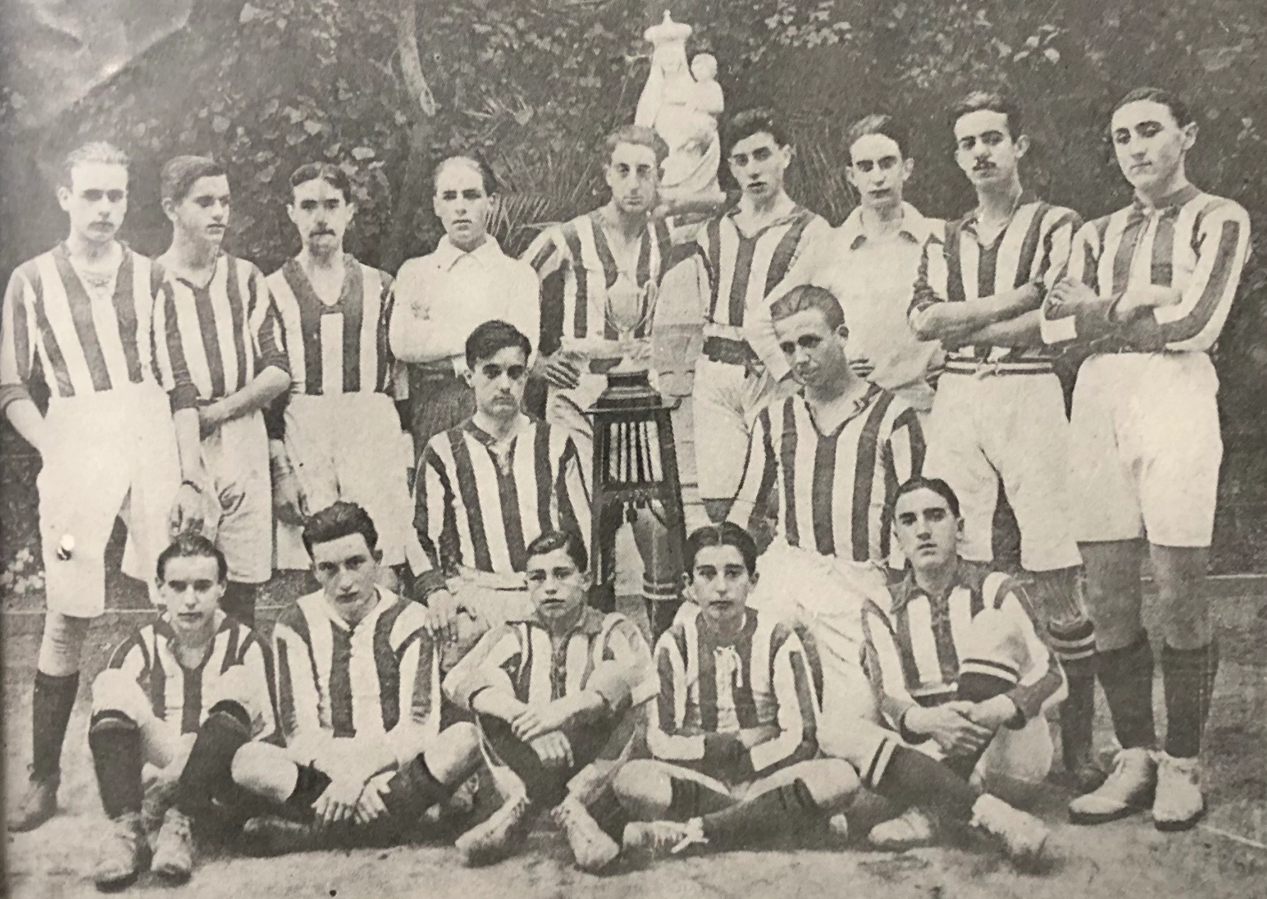
- Manzanedo (standing, four from right) in 1915

Personal information
- Full name: Juan de Manzanedo Mimenza
- Date of birth: 24 February 1898
- Place of birth: Madrid, Spain
- Date of death: unknown
- Place of death: Spain
- Position: Defender

Youth career
- 1914–1916: Pilar FC

Senior career*
Years	Team	Apps	(Gls)
1916–1926	Real Madrid		

Managerial career
- 1934–1935: CD Malacitano
- 1939–1940: Cartagena (6)
- * Club domestic league appearances and goals

Juan de Manzanedo Mimenza (24 February 1898 – unknown) was a Spanish footballer who played as a defender for Real Madrid between 1916 and 1926.

After retiring, he worked as a manager in the 1930s.

== Playing career ==
Born on 24 February 1898 in Madrid, Manzanedo began his football career at Pilar FC, the football team of the prestigious Colegio de Nuestra Señora del Pilar, where he played alongside other future Real Madrid players, such as Manuel Echenique, and the Petit brothers, Juan José and René; in the 1914–15 season, they helped the Pilar team achieve one of its greatest conquests, the Copa Omnium. In February 1917, he refereed a youth championship match between the 5th and 6th-Class teams of Colegio del Pilar, which ended in a 3–2 win for the latter team, thanks to an extra-time goal from Alfonso Bernáldez.

Manzanedo joined the ranks of his hometown club Real Madrid in 1916, aged 18, playing for the club's reserve team in the Centro reserve championship between 1916 and 1918. In that same year, after several friendly matches, he finally made his official debut with the first team in the first leg of the 1918 Copa del Rey quarter-finals against Espanyol on 8 April, which ended in a 3–0 loss. He stayed loyal to Madrid for a full decade, from 1916 until 1926, playing a total of 30 official matches for the club, including 6 in the cup and 24 in the Centro regional championship.

== Managerial career ==
In late 1934, the 36-year-old Manzanedo was appointed as the second-ever coach of the newly founded CD Malacitano (currently known as Málaga CF), then in the Tercera División, a position that he held for just a few months, as he was then replaced at the end of the season by Valentín Álvarez. When the Spanish Civil War ended in 1919, he took over the newly-founded Cartagena, then in the Segunda División, but he only lasted six matches, as he was then sacked following a 1–0 loss to Imperio de Madrid, which thus achieved its first-ever victory in the second division.

== Honours ==
Real Madrid

- Centro Championship:
  - Champions (4): 1919–20, 1921–22, 1922–23, and 1923–24

== See also ==
- List of Real Madrid CF players
