= Juan José Petit =

Spanish footballer (1896–1984)

Personal information
- Full name: Juan José Petit de Ory
- Date of birth: 2 October 1896
- Place of birth: Irun, Gipuzkoa, Spain
- Date of death: 19 November 1984 (aged 88)
- Place of death: Madrid, Spain
- Position: Forward

Youth career
- 1910–1911: Irún Sporting Club
- 1911–1915: Pilar FC

Senior career*
Years	Team	Apps	(Gls)
1914–1917	Madrid FC		
1919–1923	Real Unión reserves		
1920	Real Unión	1	(3)
- * Club domestic league appearances and goals

Juan José Petit de Ory (2 October 1896 – 19 November 1984) was a Spanish footballer who played as a Forward for Madrid FC and Real Unión in the 1910s. He was the brother of fellow Madrid footballer René Petit, and he was also the only Madrid player who fought in the First World War.

== Early life and education ==
Petit was born in Irun, Gipuzkoa on 2 October 1896, (Note: Some sources wrongly claim that he was born on 9 February 1898.) as the son of a Spanish mother from Madrid and a French engineer who was a high official of the Company of Railways in Northern Spain, holding the post of head of traffic. He had a younger brother, René, and both had French and Spanish nationality throughout their lives; Juan renounced his French nationality in 1933 and René in 1927.

Both brothers spent their childhood between Irún and Hondarribia until the family moved to Madrid in 1911, where they began studying at the prestigious Colegio del Pilar, one of the city's football cradles, where they met other future Real Madrid players such as José María Castell, Manuel Echenique, and Juan Manzanedo. The Petits had their names Castilianized and were known in Spain as Juan and Renato.

== Club career ==
=== Early career ===
The Petit brothers had already demonstrated their football skills at Villa Marta FC in Irun and at the Irún Sporting youth team, so they were among the very first players that Father Miguel Leibar recruited to its newly-founded Pilar FC in 1912, the school's football team. Later that same year, the Petit brothers participated in a championship that was contested between the different Secondary Education courses at the Colegio del Pilar, with Juan being the captain of the 3rd year students team, which lost in the semifinals. In the 1914–15 season, they helped the Pilar team achieve one of its greatest conquests, the Copa Omnium.

Petit also practiced other sports, playing a water polo match between the club members of Sociedad de Can Rabia, which was refereed by Juan de Urruela.

=== Madrid FC ===
The Petit brothers stood out from the rest of the Pilar team, so they joined Madrid in 1914, with Juan specifically on 2 May 1914, in a friendly match against Escorial FC, while the 15-year-old René made his debut for Madrid alongside Juan in a Central Regional Championship match against Sociedad Gimnástica on 15 November 1914, scoring his side's only goal in a 3–1 loss. In the very next match on 29 November, the Petits scored all three in Madrid's 3–2 victory over Atlético Madrid, two from René and one from Juan. Even though his career was overshadowed by his brother René, who became a star of national football during the following decade, Juan was nonetheless a player of class and finesse, who was a magnificent midfielder, fine and with a phenomenal control of the ball, who formed a lethal left wing with Sotero Aranguren, as they had great understanding in their passes and combinations. Petit's first notable match in the capital was a friendly against Benfica in January 1915, scoring twice in an eventual 4–5 loss to the Portuguese.

During the 1914–15 season, Petit played four of the six regional matches, scoring twice, one against Atlético and the other against Racing de Madrid. In the following season, Petit established himself as a regular starter in Madrid's forward line, which also included his brother, Sotero, and Santiago Bernabéu, playing in all six matches of the regional championship, and even though he did not score a single goal this time, he still helped Madrid win the competition in the new format for the first time. The play that the Petits offered Real Madrid allowed the Marengue team to take a huge leap in quality, and as a result, Real Madrid was once again fighting for all the titles in play. This victory qualified the club to the 1916 Copa del Rey, reaching the semifinals, where Madrid faced FC Barcelona in the first competitive El Clásico since 14 years, with Petit scoring a goal both home and away, which ended in a win and a loss respectively, so he also played in the subsequent two replays, in which Madrid eventually come out on top, thus reaching the final in which he did not play, and without him, Madrid lost 4–0 to Athletic Bilbao.

In his last season at the club in 1916–17, Petit started the pre-season strongly with a leading role in the friendly against Fortuna de Vigo on 1 October, scoring a double and being described by the local press as having "a scientific game that was astonishing". Another friendly in which he stood out was on Christmas Eve of 1916, scoring a four-goal haul against Sociedad Gimnástica to help his side to a resounding 1–8 victory, thus outdoing his brother for once. After this match, local press stated that "science, bravery, will, the whole collection of good qualities, were generously shown to us by Mr. Petit". In the Regional Championship, Petit was present in all six of the Merengues' matches, helping Madrid win all of them, thus winning the title comfortably. Petit was in the best form of his career, being the competition's top scorer with nine goals, and playing a crucial role in helping Madrid retain their title.

Petit played his last official match for Madrid on 1 April 1917, scoring the opening goal in an eventual 4–1 win over FC Espanya at Campo de O'Donnell in the first leg of the 1917 Copa del Rey, but shortly before the 1917 cup final, Petit was drafted for the French army during the First World War, while his brother René stayed in Madrid due to still being a minor of 17, going on to score a late equalizer in the final to help his side to a 2–1 win over Arenas de Getxo. The press speculated that Juan would ask for a leave to return for the final in mid-May, but he did not arrive in time; either way, the title was added to his list of achievements due to his contribution in the semifinal. He returned in late May to play his last two matches as a Madrid player in friendlies against Real Sociedad and Racing de Madrid.

In total, he scored 13 goals in 22 competitive matches for Madrid.

=== Real Unión ===
Petit sustained serious injuries during the War, and for this reason, it was thought that his football career had ended, with some publications still wrongly stating that he never played football again. However, after the War, he returned to his hometown in Irún and wore the Real Unión jersey again, making his return at the Amute in November 1919, in a second division match of the Regional Championship between the Real Unión reserves and Español de San Sebastián. The local press specified that "about 2,000 spectators attended because of the return of Juanito Petit", while also praising his game and stating that with "a little training he will be another idol of the people of Irún".

Petit continued to play with the reserve team until he got his chance with the first team in a Gipuzkoa Championship match against Esperanza on 25 January 1920. Just as he had done at Madrid FC, he again shared the pitch with his brother René, helping Union to a 1–4 win over Real Sociedad at Atotxa Stadium, with Juan scoring the last goal. With the Petits, Union won the Gipuzkoa Championship and also the reserves' championship a few days later, so Juanito won two more titles. This victory qualified the club for the 1920 Copa del Rey, starting in the quarter-final tie against FC Barcelona, which then had the likes of Paulino Alcántara and Josep Samitier; Union lost 5–4 on aggregatte.

Petit stayed with the Irún team, playing friendlies and matches with the second team, with the last reference about him playing dating to 20 May 1923, in a friendly duel between the Real Unión reserves and the AD Ferroviaria, which ended in a 3–3 draw. In total, he played several friendlies and three official matches for Union.

== Playing style ==
"A forward who masterfully dominates the ball; his passes to the wing are mathematical, and he usually hits tremendous cannon shots".

— Description of Petit in a chronicle by Gran Vida.

Petit was described in some newspapers of the time as "a very complete and colossal left inside midfielder", "a great shooter and a perfect passer", and "a master of passes and a fearsome shooter due to his toughness and positioning".

Years later, an AS Color special on the 75th anniversary of Real Madrid included a profile describing Juan Petit's playing style as "A long-striding forward who passed wonderfully, and he finished hard with his left foot".

== Military career ==
In April 1917, Petit was called up to join the French army fighting in the fields of Europe, so his friends and admirers held a banquet at the Palace Hotel in his honor, on the occasion of his departure to France to complete the preparatory formalities for military service and to fulfill his military duties. After this, he took a train to France, with his friends seeing him off at the station while the local press wished him "good luck so that we can soon see him again proud of having contributed to the defense and triumph of his country".

In September, Petit was injured in France by a kick received from a horse, but it was a minor wound, and in the following month, he had a brief stay in Hendaya before returning to the front to join his artillery regiment. At the beginning of August 1918, just three months before the end of the War, he was again injured, although this time much more seriously, as they came from asphyxiating gases, being evacuated to a hospital near Orléans. In September, he was convalescing from his injuries in Hendaya, where he was visited not only by the several Real Madrid members who spend their summers in the North of Spain near the border, but also by his girlfriend Solita who traveled to France with her uncles.

According to his grandson Juan, Petit "was injured with mustard gas and was temporarily blinded, although he never fully recovered his sight".

== Personal and later life ==
On 8 May 1921, the 25-year-old Juan Petit married Soledad Iruretagoyena in Irún, with their honeymoon taking place in Guétary (France) and later they went on a tour of the French front, where he had bravely risked his life during the War. The couple had two children: Juan León and Marisol.

After leaving football, Petit set up a customs agency in Irún, Petit and Adarraga, which became one of the most important for the transit of trucks from Spain and Europe and which was sold after his death. He was thus a successful businessman, owner of Casa Petit in Hondarribia, and father of Luis Alberto Petit, founder of the Simo computer fair.

The Petit brothers were among the many Frenchmen involved in the Spanish Civil War, with Petit being a Falangist of the Sagardía Column, while René volunteered and was appointed responsible for the reconstruction of bridges and the city of Irun.

He did not make many more public appearances, although, in the 1952, Petit gave his testimony to El Libro de Oro del Real Madrid ("the Golden Book of Real Madrid"), which describes the first 50 years of the club through the words of its players, coaches, and presidents; he stated that "I always remember with true affection and emotion those happy days of our beloved Real Madrid on O'Donnell Street, when players and directors formed a great family, capable of all efforts to always allow our team to play its best".

== Death ==
Petit died in bed at his home in Irún on May 13, 1988, at the age of 90.

== Honours ==
Madrid FC

- Centro Championship
  - Champions (2): 1915–16 and 1916–17
- Copa del Rey:
  - Champions (1): 1917
  - Runner-up (1): 1916

Real Unión

- Gipuzkoa Championship:
  - Champions (1): 1919–20
