= José Maria Zamacois =

Spanish athlete and gymnastics educator

- Born: José María Rufo Zamacois Bengoa; 21 November 1854; Bilbao, Spain
- Died: 25 October 1894 (aged 39); Bilbao, Spain
- Citizenship: Spanish
- Occupations: Athlete; Gymnastics educator
- Known for: Founder of Gimnásio Zamacois

José María Rufo Zamacois Bengoa (21 November 1854 – 25 October 1894) was a Spanish athlete, cyclist and gymnastics educator who founded Gimnásio Zamacois in 1879, which went on to be the embryo for the birth of Athletic Bilbao.

== Early life and education ==
José Maria Zamacois was born on 21 November 1854 in Bilbao, as the son of Adolfo Zamacois (1832–) and Josefa Bengoa Basterrechea, being baptized in the Church of Saint Anthony the Great. His mother died shortly after, so his father married two more times, including with Josefa's sister, Paula, with whom he had a daughter, Luisa, born in August 1856, who also became a gym teacher. His father did not pay much attention to young José, whose childhood took place in the Siete Calles, where his father had a cutlery shop since 1852, and the knife factory in Calzadas de Mallona, which advertised "Cutting knives, smooth and fast and tempered, a perfect cut".

At the age of eight, Zamacois appeared as a good student in the public exams of June 1862. It is possible that he studied at the Vizcaya College of Humanities, which was on the corner of Jardines and Bidebarrieta streets, of which his grandfather Miguel Antonio Samacoiz Berreteaga was the founder and professor.

== Sporting career ==
=== Multi-athlete ===
On 1 September 1867, the 13-year-old Zamacois made his debut in the Prince Alfonso Circus with an equestrian and gymnastic company and his performance caught the attention of everyone present. At the time, his uncles Eduardo, Ricardo and Elisa were in Madrid, where equestrian and gymnastic exercises were very fashionable in those years. During his time there, he met the professor Felipe Serrate, who had settled in Bilbao around 1866 and who had a minority of Bilbao residents attending his classes, including Zamacois, who began frequenting his gym in 1868. At the time, he was a boy with a weak constitution, but he regenerated himself through gymnastics, becoming one of Serrate's best students, so much so that in 1874, when Serrate went to the Manzanedo Institute in Santoña, the 20-year-old Zamacois took charge of Paulino Charlen's gymnasium.

In August 1877, at the Bilbao festivities, Zamacois performed a trapeze act while balancing at full flight in the gymnasium-dance hall of Charlen, to which the local press said that he was a highly prestigious gymnast and that the price paid for entry to the dance was worth paying just to witness the work of Zamacois. During the Bilbao festivities of 1880, he won first prize in the estuary with a skiff, going from the Arenal Bridge to the Salve and back, in just 17 minutes.

In 1883, Zamacois performed as a trapeze artist for the benefit of Mercy at the Circus Bell. While performing a somersault in Bayonne, he broke several bones.

=== Gimnásio Zamacois ===
In 1879, Zamacois founded the Gimnásio Zamacois, which he set up on Barrenkale Barrena and which became a popular physical culture center in Bilbao. At first, his taste for the gym stunted and sickly young people, who only had a power of 30 degrees in their pulses, but in a short time they achieved 60 along with other strength exercises that strengthened their muscles. He charged 50 reais a month for ladies and 40 for men, and if the payment was made in advance, he would give private lessons and subscription cards.

In 1882, Zamacois's gym moved to Ronda Street, being advertised in the press as a "Hygienic and Orthopedic Gym" with a lantern on the door. In the following year, Zamacois taught velocipede classes in his Hygienic Gym, which was the fashionable sport at that time. One of Zamacois most outstanding, Secundino-Acha Bárcena, was known in Spain as the strongest man in the country.

In 1886, Zamacois installed and directed the gym of the Colegio de Estudios Superiores de Deusto, the future University of Deusto. His sister Luisa opened a gym only for young ladies, in Barrencalle Barrena, with a morning and afternoon schedule, and it is possible that it was the first such gym of its time although its success is unknown.

In August 1892, Zamacois appeared as a member of the Velocipedista Club of Bilbao, and participated and won some cycling events.

=== Sociedad Gimnástica Zamacois ===
In June 1894, two months after the infamous British v Bilbainos match of 1894, the core of old members of the Gimnásio Zamacois led by Zamacois, who drafted the regulations of the Sociedad Gimnástica Zamacois. This was Zamacois' last and definitive gym, which he set up in Ibáñez de Bilbao, on the third floor of his home. At the end of the 19th century there were already more than 300 members, including Juan Astorquia, who together with six fellow sportsmen who belonged to the Gimnásio Zamacois, decided to began practicing football at the Hippodrome of Lamiako in 1898, which at the time was the home of organized football in Biscay, which eventually led to the creation of Athletic bilbao in 1901. The Sociedad Gimnástica Zamacois folded on 1 June 1912.

== Personal life and death ==
On 23 January 1886, Zamacois married Úrsula Yturrioz Abarrategui, a native of Eibar, in the cathedral of Santiago, and the couple had four children, Luis Victoriano, María Carmen, Ángel, Águeda, but only the boy survived into adulthood.

Zamacois unexpectedly died as a result of a heart condition on 25 October 1894, at the age of 40. The funeral was held in the church of San Vicente Mártir de Abando, next to the gardens where he once paraded alongside strongmen, gymnasts, and sports propagandists. His remains were buried in the Mallona cemetery.
