= Campo del Mercantil =

Former stadium in Seville, Spain

- Full name: Campo del Mercantil
- Location: Sevilla
- Owner: Sevilla FC

Construction
- Built: 1913
- Opened: 1913
- Closed: 1918

Tenant
- Sevilla FC (1913–1918)

Campo del Mercantil was the home stadium of Sevilla FC for 5 years between 1913 and 1918. It is the successor of Campo del Prado de San Sebastián. It was replaced by Campo de la Reina Victoria in 1918.

It was the host in a historical match, on 18 March 1917, when Sevilla FC beat with 2-1 Madrid CF for the first time in 1917 Copa del Rey. Sevilla did not qualify for the semi-finals after they lost the second leg of the match 4-0.
