= 1917 Copa del Rey =

17th Copa del Rey

Tournament details
- Country: Spain
- Teams: 6

Final positions
- Champions: Madrid FC (5th title)
- Runners-up: Arenas Club de Getxo

Tournament statistics
- Matches played: 13
- Goals scored: 46 (3.54 per match)
- Top goal scorer(s): Santiago Bernabéu (8 goals)

The Copa del Rey 1917 was the 17th staging of the Copa del Rey, the Spanish football cup competition.

The competition started on 11 March 1917, and concluded on 15 May 1917, with the final, held at the Camp de la Indústria in Barcelona, in which Madrid FC lifted the trophy for the 5th time ever with a 2–1 victory over Arenas Club de Getxo, thanks to a winner in extra-time from the 19-year-old Ricardo Álvarez.

== Teams ==
- North Region: Arenas Club de Getxo
- Centre Region: Madrid FC
- South Region: Sevilla FC
- Galicia Region: Real Vigo Sporting
- Asturias Region: Sporting de Gijón
- Catalonia Region: FC Espanya de Barcelona

== Quarterfinals ==
Real Vigo and España FC received a Bye to semifinals.

=== First leg ===
11 March 1917

Madrid FC	8–1	Sevilla FC
Ricardo Álvarez 5'; Santiago Bernabéu; Sotero Aranguren; José María Sansinenea; René Petit; Santiago Bernabéu	Report	Spencer (-)

Estadio O'Donnell, Madrid
Referee: (Spain) Federico Larrañaga

22 April 1917

Sporting de Gijón	0–1	Arenas Club de Getxo
	Report	Pedro Barturen 58'

El Molinón, Gijón
Referee: (Spain) Federico Larrañaga

=== Second leg ===
18 March 1917

Sevilla FC	2–1	Madrid FC
Spencer 33', 75'	Report	Santiago Bernabéu (1T)

Campo del Mercantil, Sevilla
Referee: (England) Alenxader Miller

Sevilla FC and Madrid CF won one match each. At that year, the Goal difference was not taken into account. A replay match was played.

29 April 1917

Arenas Club de Getxo	7–0	Sporting de Gijón
Julián Muñoz 8', 23', 64'; Pedro Barturen 26', 75', 79', 80'	Report

Josaleta Stadium, Getxo
Referee: (Spain) Carlos Dieste

Arenas Club de Getxo won 2–0 on aggregate matches.

=== Replay match ===
19 March 1917

Sevilla FC	0–4	Madrid FC
	Report	Ricardo Álvarez; René Petit; Santiago Bernabéu; José María Sansinenea

Campo del Mercantil, Sevilla
Referee: (England) Alenxader Miller

Madrid FC qualified to semifinals.

== Semifinals ==
=== First leg ===
1 April 1917

Madrid FC	4–1	España FC
Juan Petit 5'; Santiago Bernabéu; Antonio de Miguel	Report	Jaime Bellavista (-)

Estadio O'Donnell, Madrid
Referee: (Spain) Torrens

1 May 1917

Arenas Club de Getxo	2–1	Real Vigo Sporting
Florencio Peña 50'; Julián Muñoz 58'	Report	Ventura Lago 72'

Josaleta Stadium, Getxo
Referee: (Spain) Carlos Dieste

=== Second leg ===
8 April 1917

España FC	3–1	Madrid FC
Agustín Cruella 33'; José Segarra 45'; Fernando Plaza 63'	Report	Luis Saura 40'

Camp del Carrer Entença, Barcelona
Referee: (Spain) Julián Ruete

España FC and Madrid FC won one match each. At that year, the Goal difference was not taken into account. A replay match was played.

6 May 1917

Real Vigo Sporting	1–2	Arenas Club de Getxo
Nolasco Lorenzo 5'	Report	Cacho 60', 65'

Campo de Coia, Vigo
Referee: (Spain) Federico Larrañaga

Arenas Club de Getxo won 4–2 on aggregate matches.

=== Replay match ===
10 April 1917

Madrid FC	2–2 (a.e.t.)	España FC
Luis Saura 12'; José María Sansinenea 100'	Report	Rafael Raich 20'; Prat 115' (pen.)

Camp del Carrer Entença, Barcelona
Referee: (Spain) José Torrens

=== Second replay match ===
29 April 1917

España FC	0–1	Madrid FC
	Report	José María Sansinenea (-)

Camp del Carrer Entença, Barcelona
Referee: (Spain) R. Arzuaga

== Final ==
13 May 1917
16:00 CET

Madrid FC	0–0 (a.e.t.)	Arenas Club de Getxo
	Report

Camp de la Indústria, Barcelona
Attendance: 6,000
Referee: (Spain) Paco Bru

=== Replay ===
15 May 1917
16:00 CET

Madrid FC	2–1 (a.e.t.)	Arenas Club de Getxo
René Petit 75'; Ricardo Álvarez 113'	Report	Manolo Suárez 15'

Camp de la Indústria, Barcelona
Attendance: 2,500
Referee: (Spain) Paco Bru

Copa del Rey 1917 winners
Madrid FC
5th title
