= Arenal Bridge =

Arenal Bridge Spanish: Puente del Arenal Basque: Areatzako zubia
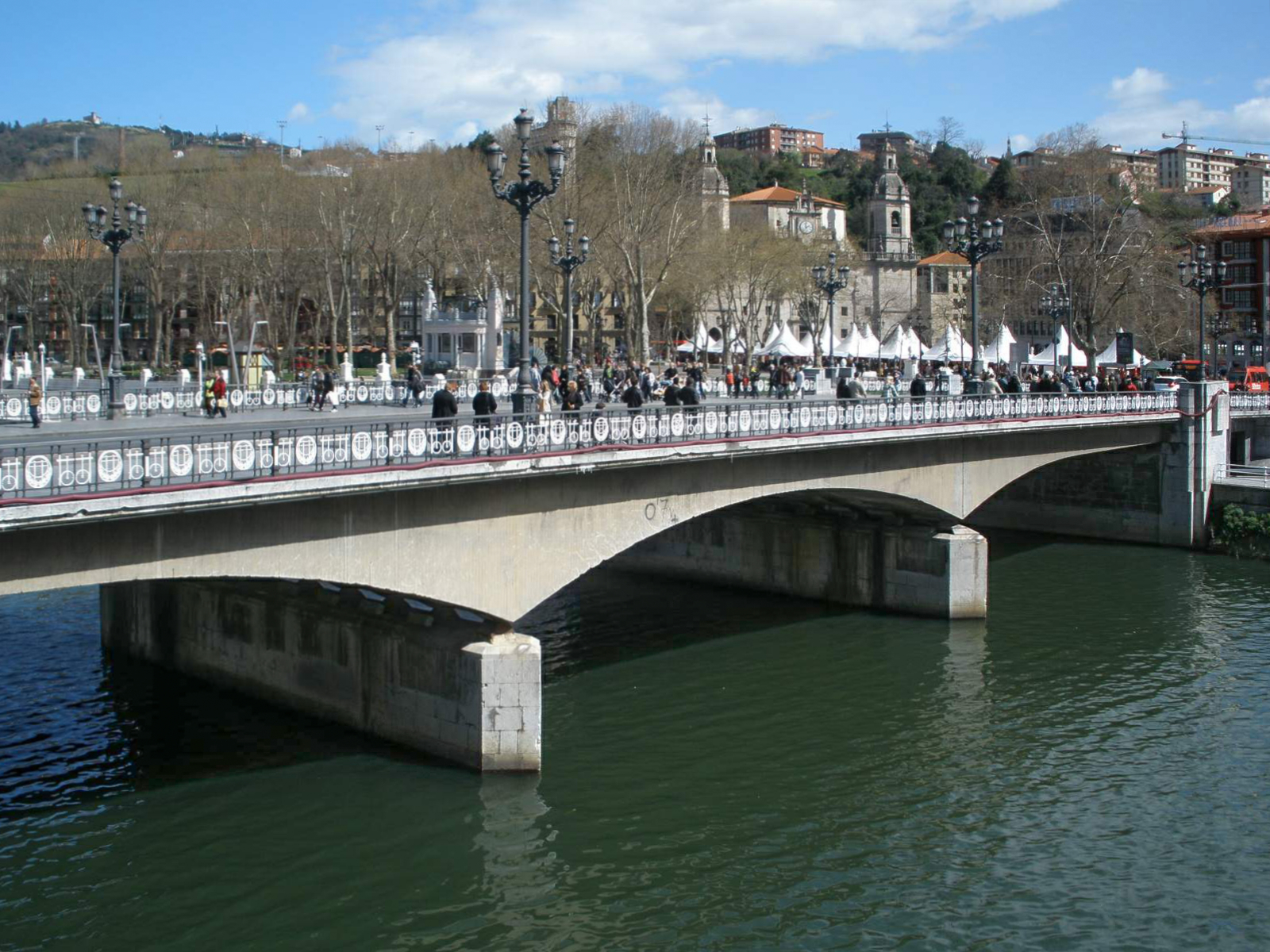
- Arenal Bridge in winter
- Coordinates: 43°15′37″N 2°55′30″W
- Carried: Motor vehicles Streetcars; Pedestrians
- Crossed: Estuary of Bilbao
- Locale: Bilbao
- Official name: Puente del Arenal

Characteristics
- Design: Reinforced concrete bridge
- Material: Concrete

History
- Construction start: 1845 (original bridge); 1878 (stone bridge); 1937 (current)
- Construction end: 1848 (original bridge); 1878 (stone bridge); 1938 (current)
- Collapsed: April 12, 1874 (original bridge); June 19, 1937 (stone bridge)

Statistics
- Toll: Free both ways

Location
- Interactive map of Arenal Bridge

The Arenal Bridge (Spanish: Puente del Arenal, Basque: Areatzako zubia) is a reinforced concrete bridge in Bilbao, Spain.

It spans the Estuary of Bilbao, linking the neighborhoods of Casco Viejo and Abando. The third bridge to stand on the site, it was completed in 1938. The original bridge was opened in 1848 and the second in 1878.

The Arriaga Theater, the Arenal de Bilbao (Bilbao Arenal) park, the Estación de Concordia (Concordia Train Station) and the Bailén Skyscraper (the first skyscraper of the city) can be seen from the bridge.

== History ==
Along with the growth of Bilbao, the urban centre of the city expanded beyond the old original seven streets, and started to expand over territories of the, by that time, elizate of Abando. In fact, the transit of people moving from Abando to Bilbao or from Bilbao to Abando grew every year and became more fluid. As the only bridge that crossed the Estuary of Bilbao was the San Antón Bridge, it became a necessity and a priority to build a new bridge that would connect both banks of the river.

=== Iron Bridge (1845 - 1876) ===
The bridge project was introduced in 1844, and it was built during 1845, to be finally opened in 1847. Once finished, it became the third bridge that crossed the river and also became the main connection between Bilbao and the elizate of Abando. It had an iron structure (it was the first known Spanish bridge made by casting) and it was a moveable bridge. The bridge was named Isabella II. The Queen Isabella II herself wanted to see the bridge during her visit to the city in 1865, in which the Prince of Asturias (which later would become the King Alfonso XII) joined her. In 1866 the internal structure of the bridge, which allowed it to open and close (moveable bridge) stopped working. Until 1870, a toll had to be paid in order to cross the bridge.

During the following years, several floods and other causes damaged severely the bridge. Three of its original arches were replaced with sections of wood. The bridge suffered more damage on the Carlist Wars, when a bombardment fell over the city on April 2, 1874. Finally, on April 11 and April 12 of the same year, the bridge was partially destroyed in a flood.

In 1876 one of its arches was placed on Udondo River (Leioa) where it is today.

=== Stone Bridge (1878 - 1937) ===
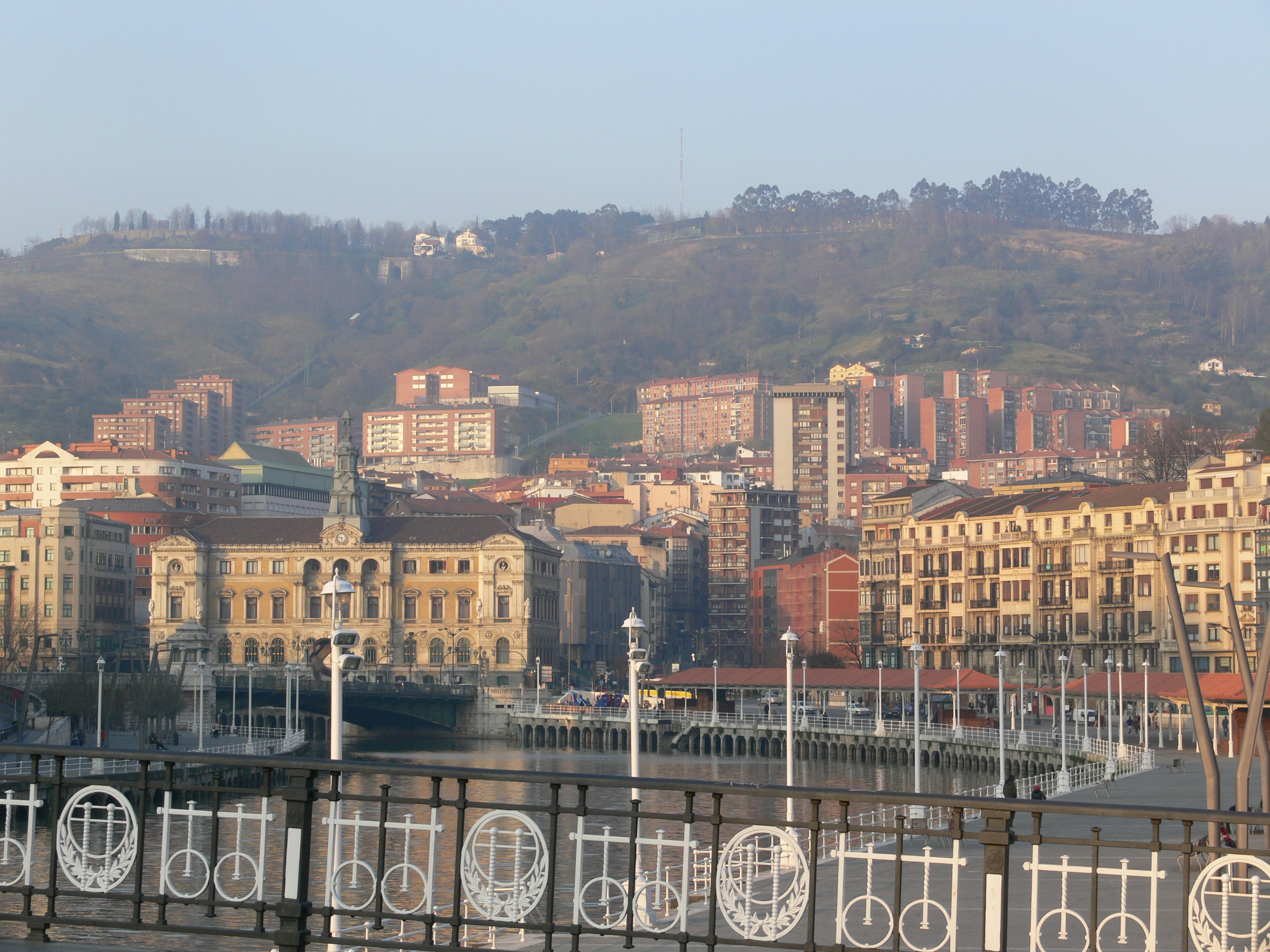
View of the Estuary of Bilbao and the City Hall from the bridge.

In 1876, after the destruction of the original bridge, one of the projects by Adolfo de Ibarreta was approved. The project included a new three-arch bridge made of stone. The new bridge was opened to public on December 1, 1878. The new bridge limited the fluvial transport to barges and small steam boats. This bridge, also called Isabella II, had a bigger surface for road transit, which allowed tramways connect both sides of the river using the bridge.

In June, 1937, during the Civil War, the bridge was demolished and a temporary one was built with pieces of wood and barges.

=== Reinforced Concrete Bridge (1938 - present time) ===
In June, 1938, a new reinforced concrete bridge was opened where the old Isabella II bridge was located. The new bridge was called Puente de la Victoria (Victory Bridge).

In 1980, the name of bridge was changed from Victory Bridge to the current one, Puente del Arenal (Arenal Bridge).

== See also ==
- Abando
