= Garnica =

Garnica is a Basque surname. Notable people with the surname include:

- Ámbar Garnica, Mexican freestyle wrestler
- Brayan Garnica (born 1996), Mexican footballer
- Manuel Garnica (born 1974), Mexican boxer
- Manuel Garnica Roldán (born 1978), Spanish paralympic athlete
- Paloma Sánchez-Garnica (born 1962), Spanish writer

== See also ==
- Cerro de Garnica National Park, a national park in Michoacán, Mexico
