= Spencer (Spanish footballer) =

Spanish footballer (1898–1926)

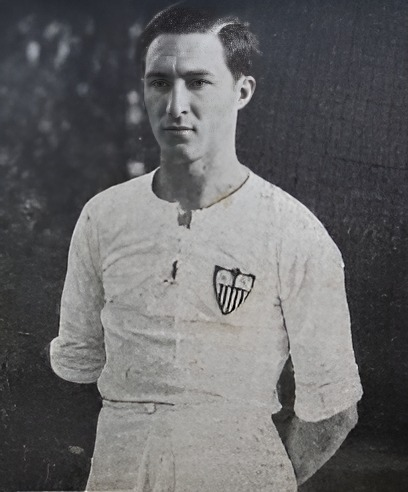
- Enrique Gómez Muñoz

Personal information
- Full name: Enrique Gómez Muñoz
- Date of birth: 20 July 1898
- Place of birth: Seville, Spain
- Date of death: 14 March 1926 (aged 27)
- Position: Forward

Senior career*
Years	Team	Apps	(Gls)
1913–1926	Sevilla		

International career
1923	Spain	1	(0)
1922–1924	Andalusia	4	(1)
- * Club domestic league appearances and goals

Enrique Gómez Muñoz (20 July 1898 – 14 March 1926), known as Spencer, was a Spanish footballer who played as a forward.

== Club career ==
Born in Seville, Andalusia, Spencer spent the vast majority of his career at hometown club Sevilla FC, whom he joined in 1913 at the age of 15. In the 1914–15 season he changed his football nickname, which until then was Enrique, to Spencer, to mislead his father, who wanted him to stop playing football to concentrate on studies.

Spencer also represented Real Oviedo, after being relocated to the city to perform his military service.

== International career ==
On 16 December 1923, in only the 12th fixture of their existence, Spencer received his only cap for Spain, a 3–0 friendly win over Portugal. The match took place in his native city, and he along with Herminio became the first Sevilla players to feature in international football.

Being a Sevilla FC player he was eligible to play for the Andalusia national team, making his debut in the team's first-ever game on 19 November 1922, a quarter-final match of the 1922-23 Prince of Asturias Cup against the Valencian Community team, which ended in a 2–1 win. Both he and Herminio represented Andalusia in the 1923-24 edition, and both of them scored a goal in the tournament, Spencer netted the winner against the Valencian team in a 3–2 win in the quarter-finals, while Herminio netted the consolation goal against a Castille/Madrid XI in a 1–2 loss in the semi-finals.

== Death ==
Due to complications from surgery for appendicitis, Spencer died on 14 March 1926 aged 27. Later that day, a minute's silence was observed before Sevilla's home match against Real Madrid in that year's Copa del Rey. After the game, players from both teams carried his casket to the cemetery, with thousands of fans in attendance.
