= Colegio del Pilar (Madrid) =

El Pilar Colegio de Nuestra Señora del Pilar
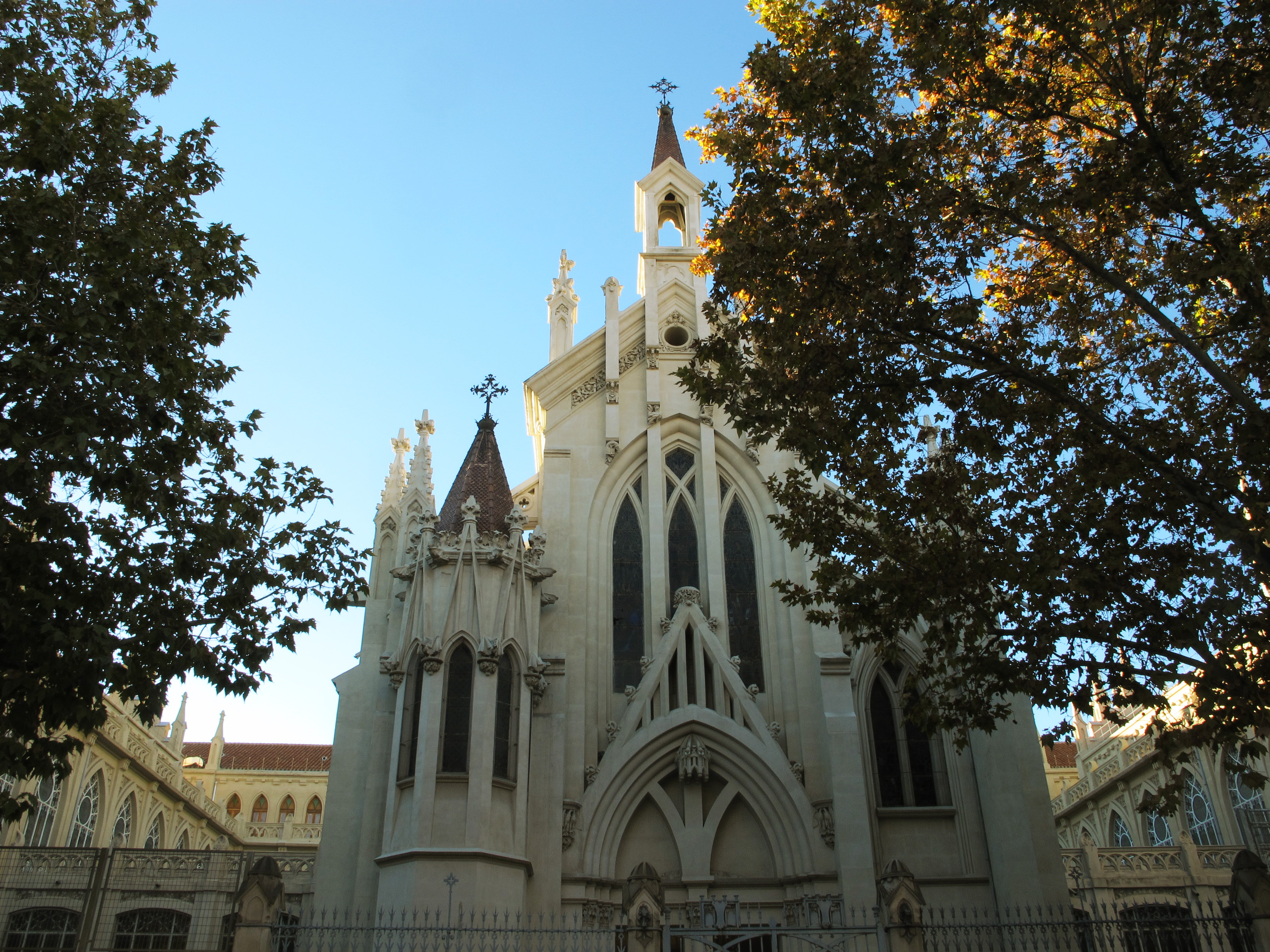

Location
- Calle de Castelló 56; Madrid, 28001; Spain

Information
- Type: Private day Public school
- Motto: Latin: Veritas liberabit vos (Truth will make you free)
- Religious affiliation: Roman Catholic
- Established: 1907
- Founder: Company of Mary
- Head Master: Francisco Vázquez
- Gender: Coeducational
- Age: 3 to 18
- Colours: Royal Blue & White
- Alumni: Old Pilarists
- School song: Españoles hidalgos valientes
- Website: http://www.nspilar.com

The Colegio de Nuestra Señora del Pilar /ˈpiːlɑːr/ (in English: The School of Our Lady of the Pillar), is a Catholic school located in Madrid, Spain. It is often referred to as "El Pilar".

It is a state-funded private day school for pupils from 3 to 18 years of age located in Calle de Castelló, in the Salamanca district.

== History ==
It was founded in 1907 by the Society of Mary, a Roman Catholic teaching order of priests and religious brothers, who still continue to operate the institution. Founded as a boys' school, it first admitted girls in 1978 and progressively became fully co-educational. El Pilar has educated one Spanish Prime Minister and numerous prominent public figures in the history of Spain.
