= René Petit =

French footballer (1899–1989)

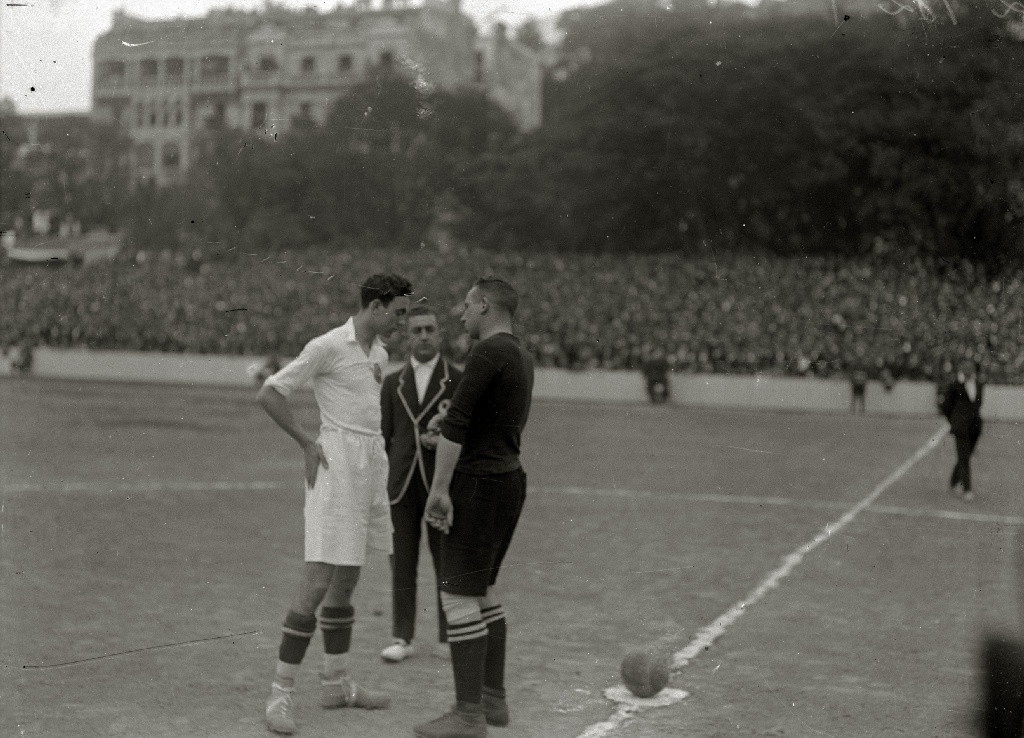
- René Petit (right) in 1924

Personal information
- Full name: Renato Petit de Ory
- Date of birth: 8 October 1899
- Place of birth: Dax, Landes, France
- Date of death: 14 October 1989 (aged 90)
- Position: Midfielder

Senior career*
Years	Team	Apps	(Gls)
1914–1917	Madrid FC	13+	(3+)
1917–1918	Real Unión	1	
1918–1920	Stade Bordelais		
1920–1932	Real Unión	44+	(8+)

International career
1915–1917	Madrid		
1922–1929	Gipuzkoa		
1920	France	2	(0)
- * Club domestic league appearances and goals

Renato Petit de Ory, better known by his French name, René Petit (French: [ʁəne pəti]; 8 October 1899 – 14 October 1989), was a Franco-Spanish engineer, known for being a footballer in his youth. He was one of the most popular players in Spanish football in the 1910s, 1920s, and 1930s, playing for Real Madrid and Real Unión, and becoming a member of the France national team. He represented France at the 1920 Summer Olympics in Belgium.

The figure of René Petit has a double ambivalence. On the one hand, there is his dual nationality, French and Spanish, and his status as a Basque-French. On the other hand, there is his double vocation: the first, as a footballer, and the second, as a civil engineer, who built Bilbao's Arenal Bridge and the Yesa Reservoir.

== Early life ==
René Petit was born in Dax, France, by pure chance, since his pregnant mother, a Spaniard born in Madrid, had traveled to that town just for treatments at its thermal waters; she was in a spa taking hot springs when the waters broke. His father was a French engineer who was a high official of the Company of Railways in Northern Spain, holding the post of head of traffic.

Petit lived a good part of his life on the border between Spain and France, more specifically in the Basque Country, hence his status as a Basque-French, growing up between the towns of Irun and Hondarribia, with the former town being the terminus of the Spanish rail network in which his father was stationed. Despite being raised in the Basque Country, Petit had a thorough education of the French type. When he turned 12, his entire family moved to live in Madrid, where his father's company had its headquarters. There he attended high school at the prestigious Colegio de Nuestra Señora del Pilar.

== Football career ==
=== Madrid FC ===
Petit began practicing football at the Colegio del Pilar, one of the city's football cradles, where he stood out as a centre-forward. From there he joined Madrid FC's youth teams in 1914 together with his brother Juan. The Petits had their names Castilianized and were known in Spain as Juan and Renato.

The Petit brothers made themselves noticed during the 1914–15 season, and despite René's early age, he also earned himself a spot on the first team, making his debut for Madrid alongside Juan in a Central Regional Championship match against Sociedad Gimnástica on 15 November 1914, scoring his side's only goal in a 1–3 loss, and in doing so at the age of 15 years and 37 days, Petit became the youngest-ever scorer in the history of Real Madrid. In the very next match on 29 November, the Petits scored all three in Madrid's 3–2 victory over Atlético Madrid, two from René and one from Juan.

The play that the Petits offered Real Madrid allowed the Whites to take a huge leap in quality, and as a result, Real Madrid was once again fighting for all the titles in play. Petit quickly became one of the club's benchmarks and stars at the time. He soon evolved from his position of forward to midfielder, which he no longer gave up until the end of his career. It was from the midfield that he contributed extraordinarily to the success of Real Madrid, which was proclaimed Champion of the Central Regional in 1916 and Champion of Spain in 1917. He played for Real Madrid from 1914 to 1917, alongside Santiago Bernabéu, who was the center forward.

On 7 March 1916, Petit played in his first El Clásico, a friendly that ended in a goalless draw, and in doing so at the age of 16 years and 149 days, he became the youngest player to do so, breaking the previous record set by Barcelona's Alfonso Albéniz in 1902 (16 years and 242 days). Just a few weeks later, Petit made his debut in the Copa del Rey, becoming one of the youngest players in the competition's history and then playing in the El Classico semifinals that saw Madrid FC defeat FC Barcelona after four thrilling matches in which his brother Juan scored one goal. He then started in the final against Athletic Bilbao on 7 May 1916, becoming, at the age of 16 years and 209 days, one of the youngest players to do so; Madrid lost 4–0.

Petit also helped Madrid reach the final in the following year in 1917, this time winning the title by beating Arenas de Getxo after the 17-year-old Petit produced a very memorable moment: When all seemed lost, an individual piece of brilliance from Petit, dribbling past all who came in front of him, allowed Madrid to equalize in the 75th minute, thus forcing extra-time in which Ricardo Álvarez scored the winner. By scoring in the final on 15 May, he became, at the age of 17 years, 7 months and 7 days, in one of the youngest players to do so, and since this was believed to have been his first goal in the Copa del Rey (he had already scored against Sevilla in the quarterfinals two months earlier), later reports wrongly credited this age when making the list for the youngest scorers in Madrid's history, which puts him in fourth, only behind Raúl, Alberto Rivera, and Antolín Ortega.

Shortly before the 1917 final, his older brother was drafted into the French army, while René stayed in Madrid due to still being a minor of 17; his brother was severely injured and seriously wounded in World War I, which forced him to put an end to his playing career prematurely.

In total, Petit scored 14 goals in 29 games for Madrid in the Copa del Rey, plus winning one domestic cup title and two regional championships.

=== Real Unión ===
Despite having just won the Copa del Rey with Madrid, his Basque inclinations motivated Petit to leave the club as he preferred to continue playing football for the team of his hometown, the Real Unión de Irún, which had just been founded. As he was studying engineering in the capital, Petit would travel to his hometown by motorcycle on the weekends to wear the colors (also white) of the Real Unión. Together with Ramón Eguiazábal, Patricio Arabolaza, and Juan Legarreta, Petit played a vital role in Unión's golden era, which won three Copa del Rey titles, including two victories against his former team Real Madrid in the final, the first of which came in his debut season with Unión, Petit helped his new side reach the 1918 Copa del Rey final, where he contributed to the defeat of his former team, Madrid, thus winning back-to-back cup titles with two different teams.

Having been born in France to a French father, the Petit brothers had to fulfill their mandatory military service there, and indeed, between 1918 and 1920, the teenage Petit had to stay in France to serve the two years of his military service. During this time, Petit enlisted in the ranks of Stade Bordelais, in Bordeaux, coinciding with the beginning of the best years of the club. In 1920, Petit played a vital role in helping the club becoming champions of the first edition of the Division d'Honneur of Aquitaine.

In 1922, Petit helped Unión reach another cup final, which his side lost 1–5 to FC Barcelona. Two years later, in 1924, he won another Copa del Rey after defeating Real Madrid in the final again. Petit played his fifth and last final in 1927, where he failed to convert a penalty against Arenas de Getxo as the 90 minutes ended in a 0–0, but a lonely goal in extra-time from José Echeveste, who had also scored the only goal of the 1924 final, meant that Petit would be winning his fourth and last cup title. In addition to these three cup titles, Petit also helped the club win eight Gipuzkoa championships.

Petit played in the inaugural Spanish national league in 1929. In total, he played 48 games in the first division and scored 10 goals. Furthermore, after Real Unión's relegation in 1932, he played one more season in the second division.

He retired from the sport with four Copa del Rey titles and without ever earning a penny from football.

== International career ==
=== Madrid ===
Being an Madrid FC player, he was eligible to play for the Madrid national team, being in the line-up of the team's first-ever international match on 10 May 1915 against Catalonia, which was held at the Campo de O'Donnell for the 1915 Prince of Asturias Cup, the first edition of the Prince of Asturias Cup, and although they lost 1–2, Petit scored the consolation goal, thus being the author of the first goal in the history of the team. In the decisive game, Petit, who always felt Basque, played against Basque Country, missing a penalty in an eventual 1–1 draw that was enough for the Basques to win the cup. The harshness with which the Prince of Asturias Cup was played in 1915 was not an obstacle for Petit, who had not yet turned 16, and by scoring a goal on 10 May 1915, at the age of 15 years and 212 days, he became the youngest goalscorer in the history of the competition as well as one of the youngest to ever score for a national team of any kind.

=== Unofficial matches with France and Spain ===
In the summer of 1919, Petit, who was in France performing his mandatory military service, decided to play for the French team in the Inter-Allied Games in Paris, a large sports competition organized in celebration of the Allied victory in World War I, as a way of honoring his brother, who fought in the war. However, the matches of this tournament are not considered official by FIFA. In the summer of 1920, when he returned to Irún to rejoin his beloved Real Unión, Petit was among the 25 players who were called in the first-ever call-up in the history of the Spanish national team, to play a series of friendlies (the so-called Possibles vs Probables) in the warm-up for the upcoming 1920 Summer Olympics. Despite his French links, Petit was incorporated to these preparatory matches, and he even played in one of them on 20 July, in San Mamés, helping the Probables to a 2–0 win.

=== 1920 Olympics ===
Without a doubt because of the Spanish, because if I came into the world in France, in Spain I was born into a sporting life, and here I have received the most pleasant impressions.

— Petit when asked about which nationally he would choose.

In order to field Petit, Spain then sought authorization from the IOC, claiming that he had played his entire life, since he was fourteen years old, in the Spanish Championships, having held the title of Champion twice. The French, on the other hand, claimed him for themselves, stating that he has been a member of the Stade Bordelais, and warning Spain that "there is a border in the Pyrenees". France's claims were not valid since Petit's license with Stade Bordelais ended on 12 July 1920, but the French selection committee had decided to have him for their team, and thus, in August, "Petit was requested by the French Ministry of War to join the football team that will defend the French colors in Antwerp".

After almost a month of dispute in the offices of the respective Federations, the Olympic Committee, and in the sports press of both countries, René Petit had to join the ranks of the French team, and thus representing them at the Summer Olympics, under coach Fred Pentland. Petit played two games and scoring none as they were eliminated in the semifinals. This prevented him from later being international with the Spanish national team, who in that tournament, oddly enough, won the silver medal. Petit, who always felt Spanish, ended up playing in the Antwerp Olympic Games with France, thus repeating the same scenario of 1915 when Petit, who felt Basque, aligned himself with the Centro Team.

Already during training, I could see that René was one of the best players of the moment, although the French selectors did not know his worth too much, nor did they trust him too much, since they even doubted a lot about whether or not they should select him, but then they were the first to marvel at his brilliant football.

— Fred Pentland, the then coach of the France national team.

During his stay in Antwerp, Petit, who spent a lot of time in the company of his Spanish teammates, was part of a negotiation between him, Pagaza, and Pentland, which convinced the latter to start coaching in Spain; this intermediation would greatly influence the future of Spanish football since Pentland went on to become the greatest coaches in Spain during his time.

=== Gipuzkoa and retirement ===
When he joined Real Unión, Petit became eligible to play for the Gipuzkoa national team, and he was part of the squad that participated in two editions of the Prince of Asturias Cup, in 1922–23 and 1923–24, with both campaigns finishing in a quarter-final exit at the hands of Catalonia, losing 0–3 and 1–2 respectively, with the author of their only goal in the competition being René Petit.

In 1924, Petit was forced to choose between representing France at the 1924 Summer Olympics and Real Unión and he chose his hometown team. His fame beyond Spanish borders had given rise to the desire of the French Football Federation to field him on their team, so they spoke to him about playing in a friendly match against Italy on 22 March 1925, but the Spanish Federation declared that although it was willing to give him the necessary authorization, Petit would be disqualified from playing in Spain for two years if he played for France, and of course that he did not agree to such a harsh sanction in order to continue playing for Real Unión.

== Playing style ==
Center midfielder. He is undoubtedly the best “amateur” in his position in Europe. His play, all precision, serenity and science, delights and excites. His physical strength contributes to making him a perfect player.

— A collection of cards from 1928.

Despite his high-scoring performance throughout his career, Petit never considered himself a striker, but a player who provided passing and support. He could play center forward, but most of his career he played as a midfielder. Petit is considered one of the most complete players in the history of Spanish football, because, due to his physical power, he could play forward, midfielder or defender; although he always preferred to play in the midfield. Real Madrid's website describes him as "the total footballer. Physically outstanding, he was, more importantly, endowed with exquisite skills. His elegance and vision of play made him an idol to Madrid's fans". Spanish footballer, coach, and journalist Pedro Escartín even compared him with Di Stéfano, and indeed, those who were lucky enough to see him play say that he was the Di Stéfano of the 1920s.

Many consider that Petit modernized Spanish football by establishing passing and team play against the previously existing anarchy; he is thus considered the first player of the modern era because of his ability to interpret the game. Petit was one of the players who contributed the most to developing football fans in Spain, due to his beautiful short and mathematical passing style.

== Engineering career ==
I became a civil engineer in Madrid because I loved Nature, living in constant contact with it, and I thought that this career could fulfill my aspirations in that regard. I have never been a man of the city, of an office...

— René Petit in an interview published by the Navarra newspaper in November 1983.

Upon his retirement from football, Petit fully dedicated himself to his professional career as a civil engineer. He had actually already been combining this with his football activity since he was never a professional player. In fact, after completing his studies at the Madrid School of Civil Engineering and finishing his degree in 1925, Petit carried out several small public works and professional jobs in Gipuzkoa and Navarra.

In 1926 he joined the Ebro Hydrographic Confederation, in which Manuel Lorenzo Pardo assigned him to the project and construction of the Yesa dam, a gravity structure, seventy-six meters high, intended to dam the Aragón River, in Navarre. He was also in charge of the works on the Bardenas Canal and the irrigation of this area would be his greatest personal satisfaction, as he later declared that "The best payment I have ever had is seeing how authentic deserts have become green, beautiful and profitable".

In 1929 he was incorporated, by Royal Decree, into the Corps of Civil Engineers. In 1933 he was entrusted, together with Ramón Iribarren, with the study of a project to prevent flooding of the Bidasoa River as it passes through Irún and Fuenterrabía. The project was postponed until 1938, when the Irún City Council greenlighted the project as part of the new layout of the city, which had been devastated by a fire during the Spanish Civil War. He collaborated with José and Ramón Iribarren in the "Plan for expansion and internal reform of the city", being in charge of establishing the sanitation network and channeling the Bidasoa.

At the beginning of the Civil War, he had to briefly go into exile in France because he had shown sympathy for the uprising in Irún, which was in a republican zone. He and his brother Juan were among the many Frenchmen involved in the Spanish Civil War, with Petit volunteering and being appointed responsible for the reconstruction of bridges and the city of Irun, while Juan was a Falangist of the Sagardía Column. In 1937, Francisco Franco ordered the reconstruction of Bilbao's Arenal Bridge, which had been destroyed during the war, and Petit was the chosen engineer to oversee its construction, which ended in June 1938, when a new reinforced concrete bridge was opened.

After the war, he was in charge of the Ebro reservoir works, until he returned to Yesa. In 1945, under the direction of René Petit, two renovations of the Yesa Reservoir project were carried out, the first one was approved by Ministerial Order on 6 February, and the second and definitive one on 15 September. At the end of these works, in 1959, he moved, as second chief, to the head of Public Works of Gipuzkoa, but following the inauguration of the Yesa Reservoir by Francisco Franco in late 1959, Petit decided to settle down to spend more time with his family, thus accepting a position at the San Sebastián Highway Headquarters, where he remains until his retirement in 1969, always maintaining his domicile in Fuenterrabía.

== Later life and death ==
Petit shied away from popularity and refused interviews, which is why he was forgotten by the football media. In any case, he accumulated a large number of recognitions, such as the Royal Order of Sports Merit. On the occasion of the Golden Jubilee (1952), Petit received the club's Gold and Diamond Insignia from Santiago Bernabéu. It was a way of honoring who many consider Real Madrid's first great star.

Among the rewards for his professional work, Petit received a Commendation of the Order of Civil Merit, and the Medal of Honor awarded by the College of Civil Engineers, Canals and Ports in 1986.

Petit died in Hondarribia on 14 October 1989, at the age of 90.

== Honours ==
=== Club ===
Madrid FC

- Copa del Rey:
  - Winners (1): 1917

Real Unión

- Copa del Rey:
  - Winners (1): 1918, 1924, and 1927

=== International ===
Madrid

- Prince of Asturias Cup:
  - Runner-up (1): 1916
