= Arthur Johnson (footballer, born 1879) =

Irish footballer (1878–1929)

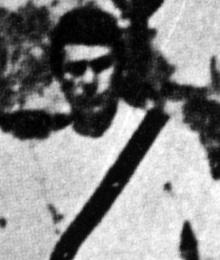
- Johnson in 1902

Personal information
- Full name: Arthur Vere Scott Johnson
- Date of birth: 31 August 1878
- Place of birth: Dublin, Ireland
- Date of death: 23 March 1929 (aged 50)
- Place of death: Wallasey, United Kingdom
- Positions: Forward; goalkeeper

Senior career*
| Years | Team | Apps | (Gls) |
| 1902–1904 | Madrid FC | 6 | (4) |

Managerial career
- 1910–1920: Madrid FC
- * Club domestic league appearances and goals

Arthur Vere Scott Johnson (31 August 1878 – 23 March 1929) was an Irish coach and footballer who played as both a forward and goalkeeper for Madrid FC.

He was one of the most important figures in the amateur beginnings of Real Madrid CF, since it was the knowledge that he brought from a more advanced football in England that helped the club to have a rapid sporting growth in its early years, thus being one of the main architects of the foundations that saw the club win its first titles and become one of the best teams in the country in the early 20th century. Johnson was also a historic player of Real Madrid, having been part of the first-ever team fielded by them in 1902 and then serving as the club's first coach for ten years, between 1910 until 1920.

== Playing career ==
Born in Dublin . Johnson was the son of George William Johnson, a schoolteacher, and Gretta Blanche Johnson (née Walker) who were married in Dublin in 1875.

On 13 May 1902, Johnson went down in history as one of the eleven footballers who played in the first official game of Real Madrid at the 1902 Copa de la Coronación, which was also the first El Clásico, and it was he who scored the first competitive goal in Real Madrid's history in a 3–1 loss to FC Barcelona. He then helped Madrid win the consolation trophy called the Copa de la Gran Peña, which was the club's first-ever piece of silverware.

Due to his great knowledge of football, which he brought from England, he played in many midfield roles and even as a goalkeeper, being in between the posts in the first-ever Copa del Rey final in 1903, which ended in a 3–2 loss to Athletic Club. Johnson was part of the legendary Madrid team that won the Copa del Rey four times in a row between 1905 and 1908.

== Coaching career ==
During his time as a player, Johnson used to show and express his knowledge by organizing and giving instructions to the team, who adopted them as their first tactical rules. In 1910, he became the first coach of Real Madrid, a position that he occupied for ten seasons. Only Miguel Muñoz has been head coach for more games. It was Johnson, who influenced Madrid to play in the classic all-white strip, mirroring the strip worn by Corinthian F.C. As a manager he conquered four regional championships and one Copa del Rey in 1917, in which his side beat Arenas Club by the score of 2–1.

== Death ==
Johnson lived in 15 Rullerton Road Wallasey at the age of 40 and died of pneumonia aged 49, on 23 May 1929. He is buried at Rake Lane Cemetery Wallasey with an inscription for his wife Ada Frances Johnson who died in Canada in 1961.

== Honours ==
=== Player ===
Madrid FC

- Campeonato Regional Centro: 1905, 1906, 1906–07, 1907–08
- Copa del Rey: 1905, 1906, 1907 and 1908; runner-up 1903
- Copa de la Gran Peña: 1902

=== Coach ===
Madrid FC

- Campeonato Regional Centro: 1912–13, 1915–16, 1916–17 and 1917–18
- Copa del Rey: 1917
