= Campo de O'Donnell =

Multi-use stadium in Madrid, Spain

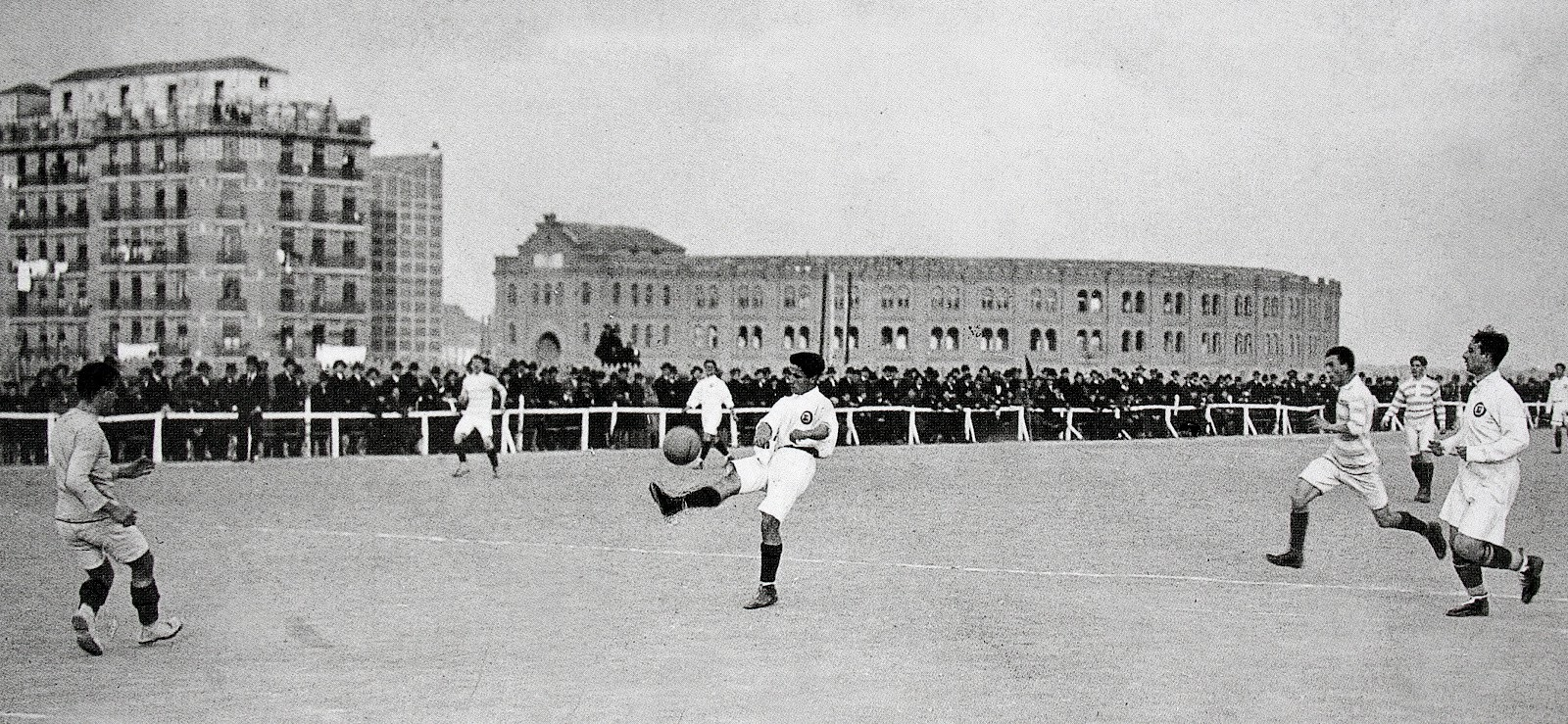
- Interactive map of Campo de O'Donnell
- Full name: Campo de O'Donnell
- Location: Calle de O'Donnell, Madrid, Spain
- Coordinates: 40°25′17″N 3°40′38″W
- Capacity: 5,000

Construction
- Opened: 1912
- Closed: 1923

Tenant
- Real Madrid (1912–1923)

Campo de O'Donnell was a multi-use stadium in Madrid, Spain. The stadium should not be confused with Campo de O'Donnell (Atlético Madrid), which shared the same name and was situated 200 metres (700 ft) away on the same boulevard. It was initially a field (campo) in the area of O'Donnell, next to the main boulevard called Calle de O'Donnell. It became the home stadium of Real Madrid in 1912. The capacity of the stadium was 5,000 spectators. In 1923, Real Madrid moved on to Campo de Ciudad Lineal, and Campo de O'Donnell was closed.

Campo de O'Donnell hosted four Copa del Rey finals, in 1908, 1909, 1913 and 1918.
