= Santiago Bernabéu =

Spanish footballer (1895–1978)

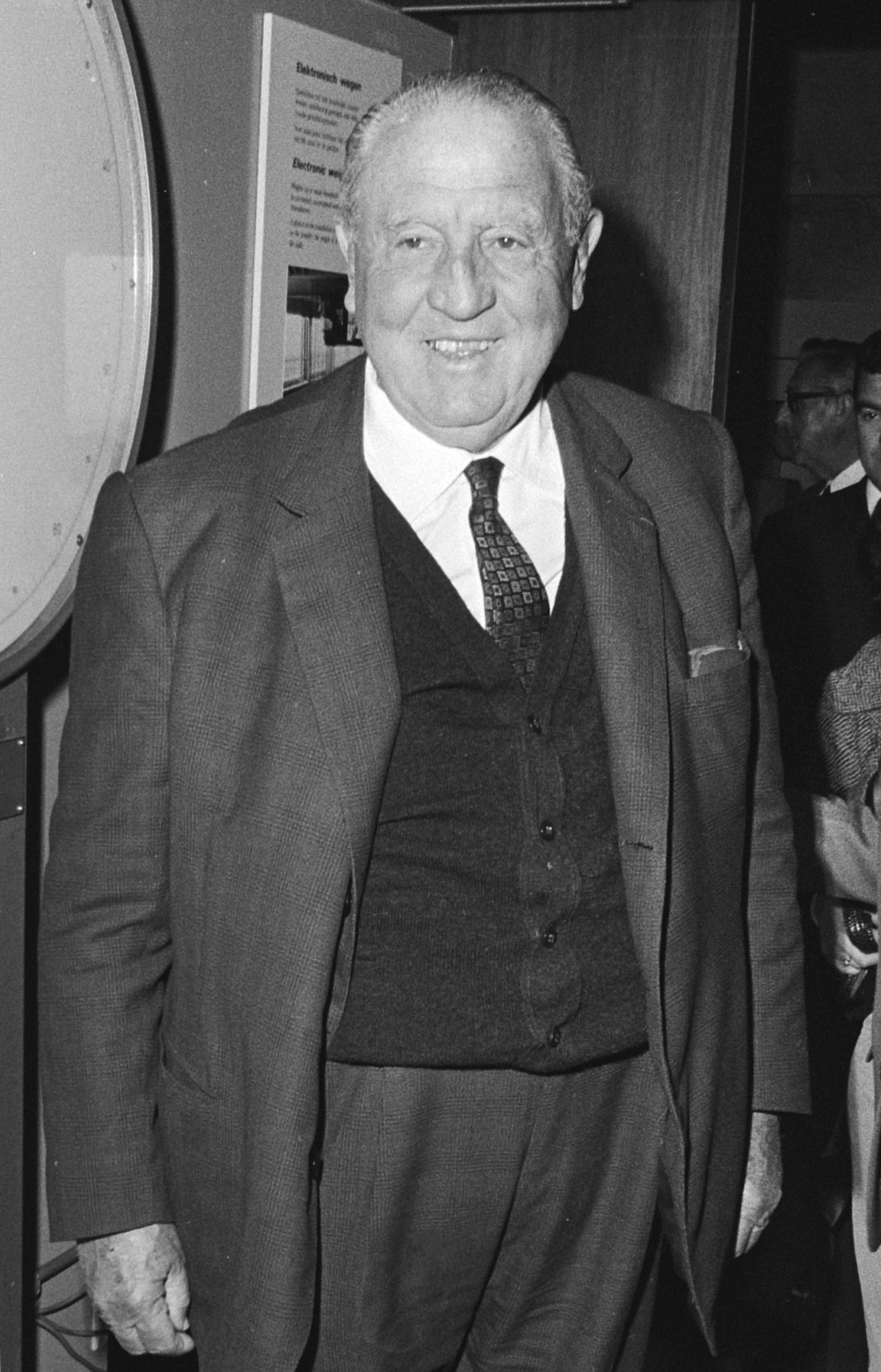
- Bernabéu in 1971

11th President of Real Madrid
- In office 11 September 1943 – 2 June 1978
- Preceded by: Antonio Santos Peralba
- Succeeded by: Luis de Carlos

Personal details
- Born: Santiago Bernabéu de Yeste; 8 June 1895 Almansa, Spain
- Died: 2 June 1978 (aged 82) Madrid, Spain
- Occupation: Footballer
Association football career
- Position: Forward
Youth career
- Madrid FC
Senior career*
Years	Team	Apps	(Gls)
1914–1920	Madrid FC	29	(27)
1920–1921	Athletic Madrid	1	(0)
1921–1927	Real Madrid	22	(20)
Total		52	(47)
Managerial career
- 1926–1927: Real Madrid
- * Club domestic league appearances and goals

Santiago Bernabéu de Yeste (Spanish pronunciation: [sanˈtjaɣo βeɾnaˈβew ˈʝeste]; 8 June 1895 – 2 June 1978) was a Spanish football player, coach, and administrator who played for Real Madrid as a forward, later serving as the club's manager and then president. He is widely regarded as one of the most important figures in the history of Real Madrid, having served as its president for 34 years and 264 days, from 11 September 1943 until his death on 2 June 1978.

Under Bernabéu's leadership, Real Madrid became a dominant team both on national and international level, with his influence stretching beyond the football pitch. The club's current stadium is named in his honour.

== Early years and career ==
Bernabéu was born in San Sebastián street, Almansa in the province of Albacete, Spain; where his family lived.

His family moved to Madrid when he was very young, and Bernabéu himself joined the Real Madrid junior ranks in 1909 at age 14, after being a regular spectator at their matches for years. Bernabéu wore the captain's armband for years. In 1920, Santiago Bernabéu withdrew from Real Madrid and joined their city rival Atlético Madrid, with whom he would only play one game. In 1921, he returned to Real Madrid, playing as a striker before retiring from playing in 1927. He continued to be associated with the club until 1935, first as manager of the first team, then as a director and later becoming assistant manager.

== Civil War ==
With the outbreak of the Spanish Civil War in 1936, professional football ceased to be played in Spain. During the war, Bernabéu fought on the side of Francisco Franco's Nationalists under the general Agustín Muñoz Grandes.

== Post-Civil War ==
After the war, Bernabéu proceeded to spend the next several months finding and contacting former players, directors, and club members, eventually restructuring the club.

In 1943, Bernabéu was elected president of Real Madrid – a position he would occupy until his death on 2 June 1978, beginning to implant his ideas. He restructured the club at all levels, in what would become the normal operating structure of professional clubs in the future, giving every section and level of the club independent technical teams and recruiting people who were ambitious and visionary in their own right, such as Raimundo Saporta.

He then went on to build what would become the stadium that today bears his name, at the time the largest stadium in all of Europe. The Ciudad Deportiva, built so that the players could train without damaging the stadium's pitch, was also constructed during these years. In addition to this, he embarked upon a strategy of signing world-class players from Spain and abroad, the most prominent of them being the signing of Alfredo Di Stéfano. During Bernabéu's presidency many of Real Madrid's most legendary names played for the club, including Molowny, Muñoz, Di Stéfano, Gento, Rial, Santamaría, Kopa, Puskás, Amancio, Pirri, Netzer, Breitner, Santillana, Stielike, Juanito, Jensen, Camacho, and many others. With this team, Real Madrid would go on to usher in an unprecedented era of dominance both domestically and internationally, highlighted by its five consecutive European Cup triumphs and numerous domestic titles.

== Influence in Europe and legacy ==
In 1955, acting upon the idea proposed by the L'Équipe journalist Gabriel Hanot and building upon the Latin Cup (at the time the most important European club tournament involving the champions of France, Spain, Portugal, and Italy), Bernabéu met in the Ambassador Hotel in Paris with Ernest Bedrignan (deputy chairman of the Ligue de Football Professionnel) and Gustav Sebes and created what was at first a loosely constructed tournament played among invited teams, but which over time developed into what is today the Champions League. Under the administration of UEFA, it is the world's premier club competition.

Bernabéu helped Manchester United rebuild its team following the Munich air disaster in 1958.

At the time of his death, Bernabéu had been the club's president for nearly 35 years, during which his club won 6 European Cups, 2 Latin Cups, 1 Intercontinental Cup, 16 league titles, 6 Spanish Cups, and 1 Copa Eva Duarte. He died in 1978, while the World Cup was being played in Argentina. In his honour FIFA decreed three days of mourning during the tournament. In 2002, he was posthumously awarded the FIFA Order of Merit.

== Honours ==
=== Player ===
Madrid:

- Campeonato Regional de Madrid:
  - 1915–16, 1916–17, 1917–18, 1919–20, 1921–22, 1922–23, 1923–24, 1925–26, 1926–27
- Copa del Rey:
  - 1917
- Copa Federación Centro:
  - 1922–23

=== President ===
==== Football ====
Real Madrid:

- La Liga:
  - 1953–54, 1954–55, 1956–57, 1957–58, 1960–61, 1961–62, 1962–63, 1963–64, 1964–65, 1966–67, 1967–68, 1968–69, 1971–72, 1974–75, 1975–76, 1977–78
- Copa del Generalísimo:
  - 1946, 1947, 1961–62, 1969–70, 1973–74, 1974–75
- Copa Eva Duarte:
  - 1947
- European Cup:
  - 1955–56, 1956–57, 1957–58, 1958–59, 1959–60, 1965–66
- Latin Cup:
  - 1955, 1957
- Intercontinental Cup:
  - 1960

==== Basketball ====
Real Madrid Basketball:

- Liga Española de Baloncesto:
  - 1957, 1958, 1959–60, 1960–61, 1961–62, 1962–63, 1963–64, 1964–65, 1965–66, 1967–68, 1968–69, 1969–70, 1970–71, 1971–72, 1972–73, 1973–74, 1974–75, 1975–76, 1976–77
- Copa del Rey de Baloncesto:
  - 1951, 1952, 1954, 1956, 1957, 1960, 1961, 1962, 1965, 1966, 1967, 1970, 1971, 1972, 1973, 1974, 1975, 1977
- FIBA European Champions Cup:
  - 1963–64, 1964–65, 1966–67, 1967–68, 1973–74, 1977–78
- Basketball Latin Cup:
  - 1953
- FIBA Intercontinental Cup:
  - 1976, 1977

==== Volleyball ====
Real Madrid Volleyball:

- División de Honor:
  - 1971–72, 1975–76, 1976–77, 1977–78
- Copa del Rey de Voleibol:
  - 1954, 1956, 1960, 1961, 1969, 1973, 1976, 1977

==== Handball ====
Real Madrid Handball:

- Primera División:
  - 1952–53
