= Copa Espuñes =

- Organiser(s): Madrid FC
- Founded: 1914
- Abolished: 1917
- Region: Spain
- Teams: 4 teams
- Last champions: Racing de Madrid

The Copa Espuñes (English: Espuñes Cup was a football competition contested by the clubs of the Centro Regional Championship. The tournament was created in 1914 by Madrid FC. The first edition was held in 1914, under the name Copas Espuñes in plural, due to the prize being eleven silver cups donated by the widow of Espuñes, and was won by RS Gimnástica. The second edition, which started in 1916, but only ended in the following year, was combined with the Copa Maura and was thus called Copa Espuñes y Maura, and it was won by Racing de Madrid. The Copa Espuñes and Maura were both named in honor of the donator of the trophies, the widow of Espuñes and Gabriel Maura, the then president of the Royal Spanish Football Federation.

== Origins ==
In April 1914, Madrid FC organized a football tournament to decide who would take the prize as their property, eleven silver cups donated by the widow of Espuñes. The rules and conditions of the tournament were approved by the Central Regional Federation (Federación Regional del Centro, FRC), being open to "the first teams of the clubs in the first category of the Centro Regional Championship" as long as they register until 5 April 1914, and such inscriptions were "to be made by a letter written by the president and secretary of each club, and sent to the president of Madrid FC Adolfo Meléndez". Each team would have to play twice against every opponent, and it would be set by points, two for the winner, one in draws, and 0 for the losers.

== 1914 Copas Espuñes ==
The tournament began on 12 April 1914, and it was contested by all of the teams at the 1913–14 Centro Regional Championship, Madrid FC, RS Gimnástica, and Atlético Madrid. Both the previous and the following regional tournaments had four teams, but Español de Madrid had been dissolved in 1913, while Racing de Madrid was only founded on 13 September 1914.

That year, the Regional Championship and the Copas Espuñes were both won by RS Gimnástica, which at the time had a great team, captained by the midfielder Sócrates Quintana, and with José Carruana and José Manuel Kindelán teaming up on defense, and on the attack, the Uribarri brothers (Eulogio and Ricardo) and Arturo Espinosa. They defeated Atlético on both matches and draw and then won against Madrid FC, with the latter match taking place on 10 May at the O'Donnell, and ending in a 3–1 victory with goals from Montero, Kindelán, and Eulogio Uribarri. Even though every team had to play twice against every opponent, Madrid FC faced Atlético only once, on 19 April, ending in a 3–3 draw, with the second match not taking place as none could no longer reach the points of Gimnástica.

=== Results ===
13 April 1914

RS Gimnástica	1–1	Madrid FC
Kindelán 5'	Report1	Juantorena

Princesa, Madrid
19 April 1914

Madrid FC	3–3	Atlético Madrid
Joaquín Rodríguez Eguinoa (1–0); Juantorena (2–0); Saura 90'	Report1; Report2	M. Belaunde (2–1); L. Belaunde (2–2); Villaverde I (2–3)

Campo de O'Donnell, Madrid

26 April 1914

RS Gimnástica	RSG won	Atlético Madrid

3 May 1914

RS Gimnástica	RSG won	Atlético Madrid

10 May 1916

RS Gimnástica	3–1	Madrid FC
Montero; E. Uribarri; Kindelán	Report1

Campo de O'Donnell, Madrid
17 May 1914

Madrid FC	Cancelled	Atlético Madrid

The last match was not played because RS Gimnástica already had three victories.

== 1916 Copas Espuñes ==
Even though the 1914 winners were promised to take the prize as their property, Madrid FC decided to conveniently change their own rules and appealed for a second edition in 1916, to which the FRC agreed, and thus the Copas Espuñes were once again organized, but the prize owners Gimnástica refused to participate in the tournament as the club considered the decision totally unfounded and unfair, and they were replaced by Racing de Madrid, which at the time had a great team with the likes of Joaquín Pascual, Ezequiel Montero, Feliciano Rey, Antonio De Miguel, and Ricardo Álvarez.

That year, the Centro regional championship was won by Madrid FC, who failed to translate that dominance into the tournament, winning only one of their four matches. Atlético defeated Madrid in both confrontations (4–1 and 3–2), while Racing only won one, but then beat Atlético 2–1 in a highly controversial match, in which the referee Carlos Dieste, a Madrid player, gave three penalties to Racing; the first was saved by the athletic goalkeeper Luis Beguiristain, and although the referee had it repeated considering that the red-and-white players had not kept the regulatory distance, Beguiristain stopped it again. From that moment, at the slightest play that Racing made, the public asked for a penalty, and likewise, a few minutes later, the judge punished Athletic with another one, so Beguiristain crossed his arms and let the ball in. Quintana grabbed the ball from the back of the net and threw it to the referee, and when Quintana was sent off, his teammates went with him to the locker room, and the fans not only protested angrily, but also demanded the amount of their tickets. While the guards began to clear the field invaded by several irascible fans, the then president of Atlético Julián Ruete ran to the Atlético booth and convinced the players to return to the field. Both sides scored once, but then Dieste signaled the third penalty for Racing, so Beguiristain caught the ball and threw it over the fence into the street and headed towards the locker room, thus putting an end to the match that ended with the victory of Racing (2–1).

This meant that both Atlético and Racing had two wins in the Copa Espuñes and thus their second match would decide the winner, so the organizers of the tournament, FRC and Madrid FC, conveniently decided to postpone it for unclear reasons, and in the meantime, in April 1917, the then president of the Royal Spanish Football Federation Gabriel Maura, suddenly decided to donate a trophy to the winners of a tournament that was going to be contested by the Centro regional teams in May, with the local newspapers stating that "arrangements are being made so that the Copas Espuñes can be played simultaneously with the Maura contest". Therefore, when the missing match between Atlético and Racing was finally held a year later at Atlético's stadium on 29 April 1917, it was merely for formality purposes. The first half was dull, with neither side managing to score, but in the second half, Racing scored the first goal from a corner kick, and immediately scored the second, completely defeating Athletic, whose goalkeeper, Juan de Cárcer, kicked a Racing forward and also attacked a spectator, who was injured, causing a pitch invasion; Carcer was detained. Racing scored the third goal from a penalty and shortly before the end of the match, they scored the fourth goal, which confirmed Athletic's defeat by 0–4, and Racing thus would have won the Espuñes Cup with three victories out of four.

== 1916–17 Copa Espuñes y Maura ==
Initially, the organizing committee of the Copa Maura made up a schedule of two matches per day on the Madrid FC field, with the first match starting at 3:45 p.m. and the other one being held right after, with the scheduled days being 6 May, 17 May, and 20 May. However, none of these matches seems to have been held since there are no reports, references, or chronicles about them, perhaps because Madrid had to play two replays in the semifinals of the 1917 Copa del Rey and then the final against Arenas de Getxo on 13 May, which was also replayed on 15 May and won by Madrid. In the end, the so-called Copa Espuñes y Maura was held in late May in a knock-out format with two semifinals and a final between the four Centro regional teams.

In the semifinals on 20 May, Racing defeated Gimnástica 2–1, with a chronicle of the latter match written by José María Mateos, stating that "the racing players played poorly and the Gimnástica players played almost worse" to the point that they even bored the spectators "who were shouting for the end of the match". Once that match ended, the next one started, between Madrid FC and Atlético, with the former receiving a special ovation due to having won the Spanish Cup just five days prior. In the first half, Luis Saura and Juan Artola left the field injured, but after the break, Artola returned to make a big difference to help a 10-men Madrid side to a 1–0 win with a goal from Alberto Machimbarrena. There were about five minutes left when Eduardo Teus, dislocated his right arm when he fell after stopping a shoot, so René Petit took his place and they finished the game with nine men.

In the final between Madrid FC and Racing on 27 May, both the Maura and Espuñes Cups were at stake, and Racing won 1–0, courtesy of a last-minute winner from Adolfo Álvarez-Buylla. Both trophies were thus won by Racing. According to the chronicles of the time, Madrid lost because it was confident in victory.

=== Results of Copas Espuñes ===
27 February 1916

Madrid FC	1–4	Athletic Club de Madrid
Montenegro 1'	Report1	Uribarri 2' (1–2); Villaverde II (1–4)

Campo de O'Donnell, Madrid
Referee: Ezequiel Montero
26 March 1916

Athletic Club de Madrid	1–2	Racing de Madrid
?? (1–1)	Report1	Tholstrup (1–0)

Campo de O'Donnell, Madrid
Referee: Carlos Dieste

The referee gave three penalties in favor of Racing.

30 April 1916

Madrid FC	4–2	Racing de Madrid
René Petit (1–1); Juan Petit (2–1); Albéniz (3–1)	Report1	Erice (1–0); De Miguel (3–2)

Campo de O'Donnell, Madrid
Referee: Juantorena
21 May 1916

Athletic Club de Madrid	3–2	Madrid FC
Naveda (1–1); Pagaza (3–2)	Report1	Machimbarrena (0–1); Sicilia (2–2)

Vallecas, Madrid
Referee: Ezequiel Montero

4 June 1916

Racing de Madrid	1–0	Madrid FC
Ricardo Álvarez	Report1

Referee: Manuel Yarza
29 April 1917

Athletic Club de Madrid	0–4	Racing de Madrid
	Report1	??

Campo de O'Donnell, Madrid

=== Results of Copa Espuñes y Maura ===
20 May 1917
Semifinal

Racing de Madrid	2–1	RS Gimnástica
??	Report1	??

Campo de O'Donnell, Madrid
20 May 1917
Semifinal

Madrid FC	1–0	Athletic Club de Madrid
Machimbarrena 45'	Report1; Report2; Report3

Campo de O'Donnell, Madrid

27 May 1917
Final

Racing de Madrid	1–0	Madrid FC
Álvarez-Buylla 88'	Report1; Report2

Campo de O'Donnell, Madrid

== Top Scorers ==
Rank	Name	Team	Goals	Tournament(s)
1	Eulogio Uribarri	RS Gimnástica and Atlético	4	1914 (1) and 1916 (3)
2	José Manuel Kindelán	RS Gimnástica	2	1914
2	Juantorena	Madrid FC	2	1914
2	Juan Petit	Madrid FC	2	1916
2	Ricardo Naveda	Atlético Madrid	2	1916
2	Alberto Machimbarrena	Atlético Madrid	2	1916–17
