= Ricardo Naveda =

Spanish footballer

Personal information
- Full name: Ricardo Eduardo Naveda de la Puente
- Date of birth: 23 April 1899
- Place of birth: Gama, Cantabria, Spain
- Date of death: 2 May 1981 (aged 82)
- Position: Defender

Senior career*
Years	Team	Apps	(Gls)
1916–1920	Athletic Club de Madrid		
1920–1927	Racing de Santander		

International career
1917	Madrid	3	(1)
1924–1925	Cantabria	+3	(0)
Medal record
Madrid
Prince of Asturias Cup
Gold medal – first place	1917 Prince of Asturias Cup	Team
- * Club domestic league appearances and goals

Ricardo Eduardo Naveda de la Puente (23 April 1899 – May 1981), was a Spanish footballer who played as a defender for Athletic Club de Madrid and Racing de Santander.

== Club career ==
Born in Cantabria, he moved to Madrid as a child, where he began to play football. At only 17 years of age, he joined Athletic Club de Madrid in 1916, with whom he played for 4 seasons, forming a great defensive line with José Luis de Goyarrola and Adolfo Álvarez-Buylla, as well as featuring alongside the likes of Pagaza, Juan de Cárcer, Sócrates Quintana and the Villaverde brothers (Fernando and Senén). In 1920, he returned to Cantabria, where he signed for Racing de Santander, with whom he played for 7 years until he retired in 1927, winning five Cantabrian Championship in a row between 1922 and 1927.

== International career ==
As an Athletic Madrid player, he was a member of the Madrid national side, captained by José María Castell, that also included, Joaquín Pascual, Sócrates Quintana, Miguel Mieg, José Agüero and Saturno Villaverde, which against all odds, claimed the trophy in the 1917 Prince of Asturias Cup, an inter-regional competition organized by the RFEF. In the tournament, he formed a partnership with his fellow Athletic teammates Goyarrola and Buylla.

When he joined Racing de Santander, he become eligible to play for the Cantabria national team, and he was one of the eleven footballers that played in the team's first-ever game on 9 March 1924, which ended in a 3–0 win over Aragon.

== Honours ==
=== Club ===
Racing de Santander

- Cantabrian Championship
  - Champions (5): 1922–23, 1923–24, 1924–25, 1925–26 and 1926–27

=== International ===
Madrid

- Prince of Asturias Cup:
  - Champions (1): 1917
