= College of Referees of the Center =

Football College in Spain

- Established: 15 April 1914
- Location: Madrid, Spain
- Affiliations: Central Regional Federation

The College of Referees of the Center (Spanish: Colegio de árbitros de la región Centro) is a football school for referees located in Madrid, Spain. It was founded on 15 April 1914 by Manuel Prast, Julián Ruete, Alfonso Albéniz, José Manuel Kindelán and Bernardo Menéndez.

Its best known for being the first College of Referees in Spain.

== History ==
=== Early history ===
The College of Referees of the Center was established on 15 April 1914 by five football entities Julián Ruete, Manuel Prast, José Manuel Kindelán, Alfonso Albéniz and Bernardo Menéndez. Shortly after its establishment, it was approved for a Board to be elected to serve as the base of this entity, and the Board was composed of a president, Prast; of a secretary, Ruete; of a member, Albéniz, and a substitute member, Kindelán. These 4 men were very influent and notorious figures in the history of Spanish football: At the time, Ruete was serving as the president of Athletic Madrid (now known as Atlético Madrid). Prast had refereed the decisive tiebreaker match of the 1913 Copa del Rey Final (FEF) between Racing Club de Irún and Athletic Club, which ended in a 1-0 victory to Irun. Kindelán had been one of the founders of the RFEF on 14 October 1909. And Albéniz, besides being the first player to move from FC Barcelona to Madrid FC, was a director of the Madrid club and an ambassador of the League of Nations (Geneva).

However, both Prast and Kindelán resigned from their position just a few weeks later, on 9 May, to become first category referees, with their most important tasks being to referee the matches of the Central Championship, and if available, the Copa del Rey. Following their exits, a new Board was elected: President, Alfonso Albéniz; Secretary, Julián Ruete; Member, Bernardo Menéndez, and substitute member, Eulogio Aranguren, the latter being elected a member of the College, after having undergone satisfactory examinations. Aranguren was a midfielder at Madrid FC, and he went on to help the club win 1917 Copa del Rey, after beating Arenas Club in the final. Prast's very short spell as the president is the reason why Alfonso Albéniz is the one who is more often mentioned as the First President of the then National College of Referees.

Finally, 10 days later, Julián Ruete also resigned and Bernardo Menéndez was elected as Secretary, leaving the position of substitute member vacant, taken by Sócrates Quintana, a Sociedad Gimnástica player who also worked in the General Directorate of Debt and Passive Classes in the Spanish finances, an institution in which he will continue working until his retirement. A year later, on 24 May 1915, Alfonso Albéniz was still the president, but Carlos Dieste had replaced Menéndez as the secretary, Martin Juantorena had replaced Aranguren as the member, and Ezequiel Montero had replaced Quintana as the substitute member. Dieste would go on to replace Albéniz as the president, thus becoming the Association's second long-term president.

The likes of Antonio Pelous, Carlos Dieste and Ezequiel Montero joined the Board after satisfactory examinations, and the latter two, together with the likes of Julián Ruete and Eulogio Aranguren, refereed at least one match in the Prince of Asturias Cup, an official inter-regional football competition contested by the regional selections of Spain.

In the 1914-15 season, this College refereed 84 games, as follows: 12 first category championship games, 42 of second, 20 of third and 10 outside the championship, plus 2 semi-finals of the Spanish Cup, and they would also have refereed the final between Athletic Bilbao and RCD Español if it had not been for the illness of Carlos Dieste, who did not alert the College to appoint a substitute. Some of the referees who refereed matches in the 1914-15 season and who were not yet part of the College included the likes of Pablo Bilbao, Guillermo and Federico Larrañaga, Feliciano Rey and Saturnino Villaverde.
