= Miguel Mieg =

Spanish footballer and architect (1896–1981)

Personal information
- Full name: Miguel Mieg Alonso
- Date of birth: 29 September 1896
- Place of birth: Bilbao, Biscay, Spain
- Date of death: 19 April 1981 (aged 84)
- Position: Midfielder

Senior career*
Years	Team	Apps	(Gls)
1914–1922	Athletic Club de Madrid		

International career
1917	Madrid	3	(1)
Medal record
Madrid
Prince of Asturias Cup
Gold medal – first place	1917 Prince of Asturias Cup	Team
- * Club domestic league appearances and goals

Miguel Mieg Alonso (29 September 1896 – 19 April 1981), was a Spanish footballer who played as a midfielder for Athletic Club de Madrid. A historical member of Athletic Madrid in the late 1910s, he was one of the first footballers to play for them for his entire career, and thus to be part of the so-called one-club men group. After retiring as a player, he become a renowned architect.

== Club career ==
Born in Bilbao, he moved to Madrid as a child, where he began to play football. At only 18 years of age, he joined Athletic Club de Madrid in 1914, with whom he played for 8 years, forming a great midfield partnership with Sócrates Quintana in his first few years at the club and featuring alongside the likes of Pagaza, Juan de Cárcer, Naveda and the Villaverde brothers (Fernando and Senén). Together with Sansinenea, Ramón Olalquiaga, Cosme Vázquez and Monchín Triana, Mieg was part of the great Athletic side of the early 20s that won the 1920–21 Centro Championship, the club's first-ever piece of silverware, and then reached the 1921 Copa del Rey Final, where they were beaten 1–4 by Athletic Bilbao.

== International career ==
Like all Athletic Madrid players at the time, he was eligible to play for the 'Centro' (Madrid area) representative team, and in 1917 he was summoned to play for them in the 1917 Prince of Asturias Cup, an inter-regional competition organized by the RFEF. That squad was made-up primarily of Athletic and Racing de Madrid players, as the tournament coincided with the 1917 Copa del Rey Final between Madrid FC and Arenas, which prevented them from having the best players of Madrid FC. In the tournament, he formed a great partnership with the team's captain José María Castell and fellow Athletic teammate Sócrates Quintana in the midfield, and despite being a weaker Madrid side than in the previous tournaments, they managed to win the cup for the first time in the team's history after beating Catalonia in the decisive game, with Mieg scoring the opening goal in a 2–0 win, thus contributing decisively in the capital side's triumph.

== Architect ==
After he retired as a player, he become an architect at Vitoria, in his homeland Basque Country. He worked as the municipal architect of Vitoria from 1 January 1928 until his retirement in 1966. As such, he witnessed the spectacular growth of the city in the mid-20th century. Examples of municipal action in the urban center include the extensions of General Álava and Postas streets. Another facet of his activity was an altruistic dedication to institutions such as the Civil Hospital of Santiago or the School of Arts and Crafts of Vitoria. Mieg's access pavilion to the Santa Isabel cemetery, a work of which he was proud, can be considered as the masterpiece of the architecture of classical style in the city of Vitoria.

== Honours ==
=== Club ===
Athletic Madrid

- Centro Championship:
  - Champions (1): 1920–21
- Copa del Rey:
  - Runner-up (1): 1921

=== International ===
Madrid XI

- Prince of Asturias Cup:
  - Champions (1): 1917
