= Manuel Posada =

Spanish footballer

Personal information
- Full name: Manuel Posada Tapias
- Date of birth: 2 August 1896
- Place of birth: Vigo, Galicia, Spain
- Date of death: 13 September 1983 (aged 87)
- Position: Forward

Senior career*
Years	Team	Apps	(Gls)
1915–1916	Fortuna de Vigo		
1916–1920	Madrid FC		
1920–1922	Fortuna de Vigo		
1922–1923	Real Madrid		
1923–1924	Celta de Vigo		

International career
1922–1923	Galicia		
- * Club domestic league appearances and goals

Manuel Posada Tapias (2 August 1896 – 13 September 1983), better known as Manolo Posada, was a Spanish footballer who played as a forward for Real Madrid and Celta de Vigo. He is best known for being part of the first-ever team fielded by Celta de Vigo in 1923.

== Club career ==
Posada began his career as a footballer at Fortuna de Vigo, but his studies in Madrid allowed him to alternate between the Vigo team and Madrid FC (now Real Madrid). He found greater success with the latter, where he featured alongside the likes of Ricardo Álvarez, Alberto Machimbarrena, Feliciano Rey, José María Sansinenea and Santiago Bernabéu. He was part of the Madrid team that reached the 1918 Copa del Rey Final, in part thanks to Posada, who was one of the most outstanding players in the tournament as well as its top scorer (together with Bernabéu) with a total of 4 goals, including a brace in a 4–0 win over Recreativo de Huelva in the second leg of the semi-finals. He started in the final against Real Unión, which they lost 0–2, courtesy of a brace from Juan Legarreta.

After the merger of Fortuna with Vigo Sporting, and the consequent birth of Celta de Vigo, Posada, driven by his immense love for Vigo, returned to his city to join Celta, and he quickly became the club's starting striker. He made his debut for Celta in a Galician championship match against Unión Sporting, and showed his great goal-scoring instinct with a hat-trick in a 7–0 win. Together with Luís Correa, the Clemente brothers (Juanito, Balbino), Polo Pardo, he was part of the newly founded Celta team that won the 1923–24 Galician championship (the club's debut on an official competition) without defeats.

Despite some encouraging first steps at the 'blue and whites', this would be Posada's only campaign with Celta, since he retired shortly afterwards. He became part of the club's board, and collaborated on the construction plans for the Balaídos Stadium, which opened on 30 December 1928 in a 7–0 trashing of Real Unión.

On 10 January 1972, at the annual sports festival in Vigo, in which the title of the best sportsman from Vigo was awarded to the athlete Javier Álvarez, a distinction was also awarded, among others, to Manuel Posada Tapias.

== International career ==
Like many other Celta de Vigo players of his time, he was eligible to play for the Galicia national team, however, he only earned one cap, in a friendly match against a Lisbon XI on 27 May 1923.

== Honours ==
=== Club ===
Fortuna de Vigo

Galician Championship:

- Winners (3) 1914–15, 1920–21, 1921–22

Celta de Vigo

Galician Championship:

- Winners (2) 1923–24, 1924–25
