= José Agüero (footballer) =

Spanish footballer

Personal information
- Full name: José Agüero Santelices
- Place of birth: Cantabria, Spain
- Positions: Midfielder; forward

Senior career*
Years	Team	Apps	(Gls)
1916–1917	Athletic Club de Madrid		
1917–1922	Racing de Santander		

International career
1917	Madrid	3	(2)
Medal record
Madrid
Prince of Asturias Cup
Gold medal – first place	1917 Prince of Asturias Cup	Team
- * Club domestic league appearances and goals

José Agüero Santelices was a Spanish footballer who played as a midfielder and forward for Athletic Club de Madrid and Racing de Santander in the late 1910s and early 1920s. The dates of his birth and death are unknown.

== Biography ==
Born in Cantabria, Agüero played with Athletic Madrid for just season in 1916–17, featuring alongside the likes of Pagaza, Juan de Cárcer and Sócrates Quintana. At the end of the season, he returned to Cantabria, where he signed for Racing de Santander, with whom he played for 5 years until he retired in 1922. While at Athletic Madrid, he was summoned to play for the Madrid national team in the 1917 Prince of Asturias Cup, an inter-regional competition organized by the RFEF. Initially, he was not meant to be called up, but because the tournament coincided with the 1917 Copa del Rey Final between Madrid FC and Arenas, which prevented the national side from having the best players of Madrid FC, they had to call-in players from the Athletic and Racing de Madrid such as captain José María Castell, Sócrates Quintana, Miguel Mieg, Joaquín Pascual and Saturno Villaverde, forming a great attacking partnership with the latter, as together they scored 5 of Madrid's 7 goals in the tournament. Agüero netted once in a 3–2 win over Cantabric and in decisive game against Catalonia in 2–0 win, thus contributing decisively in the capital side's triumph, winning the cup for the first time in the team's history despite being a weaker Madrid side than in the previous tournaments.

== Honours ==
=== International ===
Madrid

- Prince of Asturias Cup:
  - Champions (1): 1917
