= Prince of Asturias Cup =

- Organiser(s): Royal Spanish Football Federation
- Founded: 1915
- Abolished: 1926
- Region: Spain
- Teams: 2 to 8 teams
- Last champions: Catalonia
- Most championships: Catalonia (3 titles)

The Prince of Asturias Cup (Spanish: La Copa Príncipe de Asturias, Catalan: Copa Príncep d'Astúries) was an inter-regional football competition contested by the regional selections of Spain – selections of players from clubs from the region in question, meaning that players did not need to be native to the region. The tournament was created in 1913 by the FECF (Federación Española de Clubs de Football), a forerunner of the RFEF, in honour of the donator of the trophy, don Alfonso, Prince of Asturias, the first-born son of King Alfonso XIII and Prince of Asturias. After that, there have been seven tournaments for the Prince of Asturias Cup under the umbrella of the national committee of the RFEF (Spanish FA), the first of which was organized in 1915.

The first editions (1914 to 1918) of the competition were held in Madrid and the registration of the regional federations was voluntary. At the end of the fourth edition, the competition was stopped due to a lack of interest, and the trophy was awarded to the Centro federation for winning two editions (1917 & 1918). In July 1922 it was agreed to introduce a new trophy called the Interregional Championship, which would be held on the road and with the mandatory participation of all regional federations associated with the Spanish FA. The high economic costs of travel again led to the disappearance of the competition, with a final tournament being played in 1926 with the aim of awarding ownership of the second trophy in dispute, and the champion was Catalonia.

The Prince of Asturias Cup is among the oldest Spanish football competitions along with the Copa de la Coronación and the Copa del Rey. Notable figures of this tournament are Santiago Bernabéu, Pichichi, Ricardo Zamora, Josep Samitier and Paulino Alcántara.

== History ==
=== FECF Prince of Asturias Cup (1913) ===
The competition was originally created in 1913 by the Federación Española de Clubs de Football (FECF), a forerunner of the RFEF, in honour of the donator of the trophy, don Alfonso, Prince of Asturias, the first-born son of King Alfonso XIII and Prince of Asturias. This took place when Juan Padrós Rubio (the 2nd official President of Real Madrid) held the FECF presidency. Coincidence or not, just as Juan Padrós Rubio was the driving force behind the Prince of Asturias Cup, his brother, Carlos Padrós Rubio, was the driving force behind the Copa del Rey.

The squads were selected by the clubs of each region, rather than by regional federations like in the next RFEF tournaments. The teams registered were the Center team (made up of players from Madrid FC, Gimnástica de Madrid and Español), the North team (made up solely by Racing de Irún) and the Military Academies (made up of the Infantry Academy), the latter withdrawing before the start of the tournament.

The tournament was held in Madrid during the anniversary of the Prince of Asturias on 11 and 12 May 1913. The first leg was won by the North team 2–1. The North won the second leg too, but in a controversial way. With only ten minutes played, it started hailing hard, so the match was temporarily stopped, and when the referee ordered to resume it, the Center players did not return to the pitch, so the North team scored an empty net goal and the match ended.

Subsequently, the FECF Assembly agreed to repeat the second leg, ordering the two teams to fix a date and place. At the end of June there was still no date fixed. At the beginning of July it was reported that the match would take place at the end of that same month in Irun. Besides the Center team would travel accompanied by Ricardo Ruiz Ferry, the then president of the FECF. In fact Ruiz Ferry went to Guipuzkoa in August, but only to meet in San Sebastián with representatives of the Real Union Española de Clubs de Football (RUECF), a split from the FECF, and negotiate with them the merge of the two federations. The presidents of these two entities, Ruiz Ferry and Julián Olave, eventually reached an agreement in September, which culminated in the creation of the Royal Spanish Football Federation (RFEF).

=== RFEF tournaments (1914–26) ===
After its foundation on 1 September 1913, one of the first initiatives taken by the Royal Spanish Football Federation, was to promote the creation of a regional team championship that would serve as the first major "showcase" of Spanish football: To help spot the best players of the moment and consequently assemble a group of the players that made the best impression throughout the tournament to establish the bases for the formation of a Spanish team that could compete with other international teams.

The tournament was officially established by the Ordinary Assembly of the RFEF in 1914.

== Prince of Asturias Cup I ==
The first edition of this competition was held from 10 to 14 May 1915 in Madrid, and more specifically in the fenced field that Atlético Madrid had between the streets of Narváez and O'Donnell. The new competition pitted the regional teams of Catalonia (which encompassed Barcelona, Lleida and Tarragona), Castile — under the denomination of the Centro team (which encompassed Madrid and the wider Castile region) — and Basque Country — under the denomination of Norte team (which encompassed Basque Country and Cantabria). The opening match between the Catalans and the Castilians was held on 10 May 1915, and was attended by his Majesty King Alfonso XIII, who chatted with the players during the break. The author of the competition's first-ever goal was Catalonia's Paulino Alcántara, who was only 18 years old at the time, and although Centro fought back and found an equalizer through René Petit, it was Catalonia who found the winner via Antonio Baró to beat the Centro team 2–1, with all the goals coming in the first half.

Two days later the North team entered the fray, and defeated Catalonia with a solitary late goal from Juan Legarreta, even though Catalonia played better. Finally, the teams from the Center and the North met for the decisive game, and the Basques, who were playing without their biggest star Pichichi, managed to go ahead after the break with a goal from Patricio, but the hosts fought back and equalized shortly after courtesy of Santiago Bernabéu. René Petit then missed a penalty, which was attributed to the fact that the field was not grass. In any case, the game was formidable and the draw was enough for the Basques to win the cup, although according to the press, they were not the best team. As for the top scorers, there was a six-fold tie at one goal as six different players scored all the goals of this first edition of the tournament. These accolades were also distributed among the three teams, as they all finished tied at two goals each.

=== Results ===
10 May 1915
16:50 CEST

Centro	1–2	Catalonia
Petit (1-1)	Report1; Report2	Alcántara (0-1); Baró (1-2)

Campo de O'Donnell, Madrid
Referee: (Community of Madrid) Julián Ruete

12 May 1915
17:00 CEST

(Note: The 'North Federation' (Norte) team included Cantabria, but usually featured only players from the Basque provinces of Biscay and Gipuzkoa, each of which also organised their own representative matches occasionally.) Basque Country	1–0	Catalonia
Legarreta 75'	Report1; Report2

Campo de O'Donnell, Madrid
Referee: (Community of Madrid) Bernardo Menéndez

14 May 1915

Centro	1–1	Basque Country
Bernabéu 50'; Petit (penalty missed)	Report1; Report2	Patricio 60'

Campo de O'Donnell, Madrid
Referee: (Community of Madrid) Carlos Dieste

Norte's line-up: Eizaguirre, Carrasco, Hurtado, Artola, Belauste I, Peña, Legarreta, Patricio, Belauste II, Pagaza and Echevarría (Pedro Barturen). 4 of these players, Belauste I, Belauste II and Echevarría, played for Athletic Bilbao at the 1915 Copa del Rey Final.

Centro's line-up: Pelous, Carruana, Beguiristain, Eulogio Aranguren, Feliciano Rey, Machimbarrena, Quintana, René Petit, Álvarez, Montero, Sotero Aranguren (Bernabéu).

Catalonia's line-up: Luis Bru, Reguera (Santiago Massana), Miguel Matifoll (Casellas), Torralba, Alfredo Massana, Alcántara, Monistrol, Mallorquí, Baró, Peris and Martínez (Kinké).

== Prince of Asturias Cup II ==
The following year the competition was held in Madrid again, but this time it did not reach the sporting success and brilliance of the previous one. The title holders, the North Team, did not participate because they were unable to gather all their members due to disagreements that occurred within their own regional federation. (Note: The discrepancies between the Basque and Cantabrian representatives led to the latter abandoning the Northern Football Federation, which led to a restructuring of the football organization in the north of Spain.) Thus, the title was contested only by the Catalan and Central teams, even though the triangular format was kept until the last moment. This new edition was played on the same venue as the previous one, with a double confrontation (due to the absence of the Basques) between both teams, the first of which was played on 11 May 1916 with a Catalan victory by 6–3, after showing total superiority over a disappointing local team. The star of the game was Francisco Cabedo, who scored the competition's first-ever (and only) hat-trick when he netted 4 goals past Centro's goalkeeper Juan de Cárcer, who was thus replaced by Joaquín Pascual for the second leg, which was much more competitive and with a slight local superiority since it found themselves 2–0 up with 20 minute to go, knowing that this win would force a play-off for the title, but Kinké wrecked Centro's hopes with a quick late brace that salvaged a 2–2 draw to the Catalans. Catalonia thus won the Prince of Asturias Cup for the first time in their history.

=== Results ===
11 May 1916
17:00 CEST

Centro	3–6	Catalonia
Álvarez 15'; Bernabéu 40'; Larrañaga 80' (pen.)	Report1; Report2	Cabedo 12', 20', 35', 60'; Sampere 30'; Kinké 50'

Campo de O'Donnell, Madrid
Referee: (Community of Madrid) Carlos Dieste

Because of the absence of the Northern team, a second match was played between Catalonia and Centro, elucidating the title to a two-legged final.

13 May 1916
16:30 CEST

Centro	2–2	Catalonia
De Miguel 50'; Larrañaga 70'	Report1; Report2	Kinké 75', 80' (pen.)

Campo de O'Donnell, Madrid
Referee: (Community of Madrid) Carlos Dieste

Catalonia's line-up was exactly the same for both games: Gibert; Pakán, Sampere, Salvó I; Casellas, Prat, Kinké, Monistrol; Cabedo, López and Raich. Four of these players, Gibert, Pakán, Sampere and López, played for Espanyol at the 1915 Copa del Rey Final.

Centro's line-ups: Cárcer (Pascual); Erice (La Serna), Carruana; E. Aranguren (Tejedor), René Petit (Castell), Quintana; Álvarez, Santiago Bernabéu, E. Uribarri (Pelous), Larrañaga and De Miguel. Four of these players, Erice, Petit, Álvarez and De Miguel, played for Madrid FC at the 1917 Copa del Rey final.

=== Top Scorers ===
Rank	Player	Team	Goals
1	Francisco Cabedo	Catalonia	4
2	Kinké	Catalonia	3
3	Larrañaga	Centro	2

== Prince of Asturias Cup III ==
The third edition of the tournament suffered again the absence of the Northern Team, whose Basque Football Federation was going through a convulsive period between the teams from Biscay and Gipuzkoa, culminating in a pivotal championship match between Athletic Bilbao (Biscay) and Real Sociedad (Gipuzkoa) being abandoned, and so, the recently created Federation of Cantabria took advantage of the absence of the Northern Team that was still in internal disputes, and sent its representation to Madrid to compete with Centro and Catalonia. The 1917 edition was wrapped in controversy because it was allowed to be played on the same day as the final of the 1917 Copa del Rey between Madrid FC and Arenas de Getxo, which prevented the Central Team from having the players of Madrid FC, and thus, in order to assemble a team which could compete, they had to call-up the players from Athletic Madrid and Racing de Madrid, meaning they sent a weaker team with lesser-known players such as Racing's Pascual, Buylla, Zabala and Pablo De Miguel (the brother of Antonio, who had played and scored in the previous edition); and Atlético's Yañez, Miguel Mieg, Quintana, Agüero, and Saturno Villaverde, with the captain of this team being Madrid FC's only representative, José María Castell, and yet, against all odds, the "second options" managed to win the tournament for the first time in the team's history.

Centro and Catalonia opened the competition on 9 May 1917, also at O'Donnell's ground, and despite playing away from home, everyone was expecting a comfortable win for the Catalan side, but the Castilian team showed their worth and held the huge favorites to a 2–2 draw, thanks to a brace from Saturno Villaverde. These two sides then both beat the Cantabrians, but while Catalonia did it with a tight 1–0 thanks to a lonely goal from Josep Gumbau, Centro surprised everyone when they found themselves leading 3–0 at the break with goals from captain Castell, Agüero, and Villaverde, in an eventual 3–2 win (Centro's goalkeeper Joaquín Pascual scored an own goal, the competition's first and only, although Centro still won), meaning that a playoff match between the local team and Catalonia had to be played, as both were level on three points. The decisive clash was played at O'Donnell on the 15 May and Centro showed their quality once again by beating its rival 2–0, with second-half goals from Mieg and Agüero, thus winning the tournament, lifting the trophy, and matching the feats achieved by Norte and Catalonia in the previous two editions of the competition. However, the game, just like the tournament itself, was wrapped in controversy, because at 2–0 down, Catalonia had a goal from Monistrol disallowed in the 70th minute for having scored directly from a corner kick, a circumstance not allowed at the time, and that event led referee Julián Ruete to send off a visiting player (probably Artur Cella) due to the protests, to which the Catalan team left the match in protest. Atlético's Saturno Villaverde was the star of the tournament, being the top scorer with 3 goals - a brace against Catalonia in a 2–2 draw and the winner against Cantabria in a 3–2 win - thus going from an utter unknown of the masses to the tournament's surprise package and a loved hero in Madrid.

=== Results ===
9 May 1917

Centro	2–2	Catalonia
Villaverde	Report	Gumbau; Alcover

Campo de O'Donnell, Madrid
Referee: (Community of Madrid) Carlos Dieste

Note: Some sources claim that both of Catalonia's goals were actually two first-half own goals from Centro's Yáñez.

10 May 1917

Catalonia	1–0	Cantabric (Note: A combined team of players from Asturias and Cantabria.)
Gumbau 30'	Report

Campo de O'Donnell, Madrid
Referee: (Community of Madrid) Bernardo Menéndez

11 May 1917

Centro	3–2	Cantabric
Castell 20' (pen.); Agüero 30'; Villaverde 45'	Report	Felgueroso 50'; Pascual 60' (o.g.)

Campo de O'Donnell, Madrid
Referee: (Basque Country (autonomous community)) Pelayo Serrano

Note: After the corresponding triangular format, a final playoff game had to be necessary since the Castilians and the Catalans were tied on three points after a draw and a victory each.

15 May 1917
17:00 CEST

Centro	2–0	Catalonia
Mieg 50' (Note: Some reports claim that Centro's opening goal was scored by Zabala.); Agüero 60'	Report; Report2

Campo de O'Donnell, Madrid
Referee: (Community of Madrid) Julián Ruete

Centro's winning squad: Joaquín Pascual, José Luis de Goyarrola, Ricardo Naveda, José María Castell (Yáñez), Ezequiel Montero, Adolfo Buylla (Sócrates Quintana), Ignacio Zabala, José Agüero, Saturno Villaverde, Miguel Mieg (Pablo De Miguel) and Larrañaga (Ricardo Madariaga).

=== Top Scorers ===
Rank	Player	Team	Goals
1	Saturno Villaverde	Centro	3
2	Josep Gumbau	Catalonia	2
2	José Agüero	Centro	2

== Prince of Asturias Cup IV ==
After three editions of the Prince of Asturias Cup, the results had not met the expectations generated in the competition. The intransigence of the clubs to allow the transfer of their players meant that few federations could gather a complete team to participate, and when this was achieved, it could not be said that it was made up of the best players in the region. On the other hand, the incompetence of some federative leaders and the calendar of the competition that allowed the 1917 edition to be played on the same day as the 1917 Copa del Rey final between Madrid FC and Arenas de Getxo - something that prevented the Central Team from having the best players of Madrid and the Basques would have left them without the contribution of their champions, the Arenas Club - had caused the tournament to lose the splendor of the first two editions. Furthermore, the idea of forming a national team to compete with other countries received a setback because of the First World War. Thus, in January 1918, the clubs proposed to the National Federation the suppression of the competition, and this proposal was accepted in favour of a second category competition, since the tight schedule (in the previous edition the contest coincided with the final phase of the Copa del Rey) and controversies of another nature prevented the participation of the best players. Therefore, the edition that was held in Madrid between 20 and 23 January of that same year, was going to be the last in the first stage of this competition, and only the central team and the Cantabrian team participated, as they were the only ones that could put together a team with which to compete.

The Castilian team won the first leg 3–2 with goals from Sansinenea, Gomar and Feliciano Rey, while the away goals were scored by the Villaverde brothers, Senén and Fernando, with the former netting one more in the second leg in yet another loss as Centro won 3–1 thanks to a brace from Ramón Olalquiaga, who had not played the first leg. Both games were dominated by the Centro side, with special mention to Cárcer, Machim, Gomar, who trotted a lot, and De Miguel and Sansinenea, who, although obsessed with doing everything by themselves, played brilliantly. The 6–3 aggregate win meant Centro was proclaimed champions again, thus becoming the last winners of the competition's first stage as well as the first team to win the cup twice, doing so in consecutive editions, although the 1918 games sparked little interest in the fans.

=== Results ===
20 January 1918

Centro	3–2	Cantabric
Sansinenea; Gomar; Rey	Report	Villaverde III; Villaverde I

Campo de O'Donnell, Madrid
Referee: (Basque Country (autonomous community)) Pelayo Serrano

23 January 1918

Centro	3–1	Cantabric
Sansinenea; Olalquiaga	Report1; Report2	Villaverde III

Campo de O'Donnell, Madrid
Referee: (Community of Madrid) Carlos Dieste

=== Top Scorers ===
Rank	Player	Team	Goals
1	José María Sansinenea	Centro	2
1	Senén Villaverde	Cantabric	2
1	Ramón Olalquiaga	Centro	2

== Resurgence ==
Two years later, the Spanish national team made its official debut at the 1920 Olympic Games in Antwerp, and despite being their first-ever taste of an international major tournament they still managed to win the silver medal. Notably, the author of Spain's first-ever goal, Patricio, also scored in the first edition of the Prince of Asturias Cup in 1915. This good run by the Spanish side increased football's popularity in the country, and to defend the success achieved and prepare the Spanish team for the next Olympic Games in 1924, the Spanish FA agreed on 20 July 1922, to reestablish the Prince of Asturias Cup (under the name Campeonato Interregional) as the basis for the composition of the national team, and this time with the obligatory participation by all member regions on the Spanish mainland. Once again the proposal got an excellent reception among the clubs and the fans. Matches were now played at different venues, but due to logistic and financial problems, it was decided to stop the competition after the third edition, which was played between the winners of the first two with the sole objective of deciding which region obtained the cup to keep.

== Prince of Asturias Cup V ==
The first edition of the revived tournament (and fifth overall) was won by Asturias after beating the tournament's surprise package Galicia in the final 3–1, courtesy of a second-half brace from José Luis Zabala, who was the star of the tournament and its top scorer with 5 goals, including a last-minute winner against Catalonia in the semi-finals.

1922–23 Prince of Asturias Cup winner

Asturias
First title

== Prince of Asturias Cup VI ==
The second edition of the revived tournament (and sixth overall) was won by Catalonia after beating Centro 3–2 in the replay of the final, after the original game finished in a dramatic 4–4 draw thanks to a last-minute equalizer from Emili Sagi-Barba. The top scorer of the tournament was Centro's Juan Monjardín with 5 goals, of which three came in the final, scoring twice in a 2–3 loss to Catalonia in the replay. Josep Samitier also scored three goals in the final, and despite having failed to net in any other game, he still got the "silver boot".

1923–24 Prince of Asturias Cup winner

Catalonia
Second title

The sixth edition of this competition did not achieve the success of the previous one and failed to serve as the basis for forming the Spanish squad for the 1924 Summer Olympics and after the Spanish failure in Paris, the Prince of Asturias Cup ended up being definitively abolished by the Spanish FA on 26 June 1924.

== Prince of Asturias Cup VII ==
The last edition of this Inter-regional tournament was played several months later, in September 1926, between the previous two champions, Asturias and Catalonia, for the right to keep the trophy. On 5 September 1926, the first leg of this ultimate final was played in El Molinón, ending in a 2–0 win for the Catalans, with both goals being scored by Domingo Broto. On the 19th of the same month at the Camp del Guinardó, the second leg was held, and Asturias only needed 5 minutes to score the opening goal against the local team, thus setting the scene for an incredible comeback at Barcelona, but Forgas killed off their momentum with an equalizer just 5 minutes later, which no longer moved until the break. After the break, the Catalans' game improved, and through Pellicer, Alcántara and Forgas they put the score in a clear 4–1, being Herrera who, with two goals in the last five minutes, closed the gap and established the final result, another Catalan victory by 4–3. With this win, Catalonia remained in the property of the Prince of Asturias Cup trophy.

=== Results ===
5 September 1926

Asturias	0–2	Catalonia
	Report; Report2	Broto 22', 80'

El Molinón, Gijón
Referee: (Basque Country (autonomous community)) José María Steimborn

Asturian side: Benjamín; Quirós, Trucha; Justo, Menéndez, Corsino; Domingo, Morilla, Herrera, Avilesu and Molinuco.

Catalonia side: Pedret; Serra, Montané; Tena I, Pelaó, Mauricio; Piera, Samitier, Sastre, Broto and Sagi-Barba.

19 September 1926

Catalonia	4–3	Asturias
Forgas 10', 82'; Pellicer 59'; Alcántara 79'	Report; Report2	Avilesu 5'; Herrera 85', 87'

Guinardó, Barcelona
Referee: (Basque Country (autonomous community)) José María Steimborn

Catalonia side: Pedret; Serra, Massagué; Soligo, Pelaó, Tena I; Pellicer, Broto, Forgas, Alcántara and Sagi-Barba. 3 of these players, Serra, Pelaó, and Pellicer, played for CE Europa at the 1923 Copa del Rey Final.

Asturias side: Benjamín; Quirós, Cuesta; Bango, Menéndez, Corsino; Matón, Avilesu, Herrera, Braulio and Argüelles (Quirós being replaced by Nico and Benjamín by Picú during the match).

=== Top Scorers ===
Rank	Player	Team	Goals
1	Domingo Broto	Catalonia	2
1	Ramón Herrera	Asturias	2
1	Josep Forgas	Catalonia	2

== List of winners ==
Year	Winner	Score	Runner-up	Third place (If any)
1915	Basque Country		Catalonia	Centro
1916	Catalonia	6–3 and 2–2	Centro	
1917	Centro	2–0	Catalonia	[[Cantabria {{{altlink}}}|Cantabria]]
1918	Centro	3–2 and 3–1	[[Cantabria {{{altlink}}}|Cantabria]]	
1922–23	Asturias	3–1	Galicia	
1923–24	Catalonia	3–2	Centro	
1926	Catalonia	2–0 and 4–3	Asturias	

== Most successful teams ==
Rank	Country	Winners	Runners-up
1	Catalonia	3 (1916, 1924 & 1926)	2 (1915 & 1917)
2	Centro	2 (1917 & 1918)	2 (1916 & 1924)
3	Asturias	1 (1923)	2 (1918 (Note: As part of the Cantabria team) & 1926)
4	(Basque Country (autonomous community)) Norte	1 (1915)	—
5	(Galicia (Spain)) Galicia	—	1 (1923)

== Records and statistics ==
=== Top scorers per tournament ===
Tournament	Name	Team	Goals
1915	6 different players		1
1916	(Catalonia) Francisco Cabedo	Catalonia	4
1917	Saturno Villaverde	Centro	3
1918	Senén Villaverde	Cantabric	2
1918	José María Sansinenea	Centro	2
1918	Ramón Olalquiaga	Centro	2
1922–23	(Asturias) José Luis Zabala	Asturias	5
1923–24	Juan Monjardín	Centro	5
1926	(Catalonia) Domingo Broto	Catalonia	2
1926	(Catalonia) Josep Forgas	Catalonia	2
1926	(Asturias) Ramón Herrera	Asturias	2

=== Most goals in a single tournament ===
Ranking	Name	Team	Goals	Tournament
1	(Asturias) José Luis Zabala	Asturias	5	1922–23
1	Juan Monjardín	Centro	5	1923–24
3	(Catalonia) Francisco Cabedo	Catalonia	4	1916
4	(Catalonia) Kinké	Catalonia	3	1916
4	Saturno Villaverde	Centro	3	1917
4	(Galicia (Spain)) Ramón González	Galicia	3	1922–23
4	(Catalonia) Josep Samitier	Catalonia	3	1923–24

=== All-time top goalscorers ===
Rank	Name	Team	Goals	Tournament(s)
1	(Asturias) José Luis Zabala	Asturias	6	1922–23 (5) and 1923–24 (1)
1	Juan Monjardín	Centro	6	1922–23 (1) and 1923–24 (5)
1	(Catalonia) (Andalusia) Kinké	Catalonia and South	6	1916 (3), 1922–23 (2) and 1923–24 (1)
4	(Catalonia) Josep Samitier	Catalonia	4	1922–23 (1) and 1923–24 (3)
4	(Catalonia) Francisco Cabedo	Catalonia	4	1916 (4)
6	Saturno Villaverde	Centro	3	1917 (3)
6	(Galicia (Spain)) Ramón González	Galicia	3	1922–23 (3)
6	(Biscay) Travieso	Biscay	3	1922–23 (1) and 1923–24 (2)
6	(Valencian Community) Eduardo Cubells	Valencian Community	3	1922–23 (1) and 1923–24 (2)

Notable figures with two goals include Santiago Bernabéu (1 goal in 1915 and 1916), René Petit (1 goal in 1915 and 1923–24), Paulino Alcántara (1 goal in 1915 and 1926), Ramón Polo Pardo (2 goals in 1922–23), Cristóbal Martí (1 goal in 1922–23 and 1923–24) and Vicente Piera (2 goals in 1923–24).

=== Hat-tricks ===
From the first official tournament in 1915, until its last 11 years later, only one hat-trick was scored, and curiously, it was actually a poker. The first and last treble of the Prince of Asturias Cup was scored by Francisco Cabedo on 11 May 1916 in the second edition of the competition in a game between fierce rivals Catalonia and the Centro team, with the former winning 6–3, and interestingly, this is the only game in the competition's history in which a team scored at least 5 goals. Oddly, this was the only time Cabedo found the back of the net in the Prince of Asturias Cup, but despite that his 4-goal haul alone makes him one of the all-time top goal scorer in the competition's history. It's also worth mentioning that some reports list José Luis Zabala as the author of the opening goal of the 1922–23 final on 25 February 1923, which together with his second-half brace makes for another hat-trick in the competition, and one that handed Asturias a 3–1 win over Galicia at Coia.

Prince of Asturias Cup hat-tricks
#	Player	G	Time of goals	For	Result	Against	Tournament	Date	Ref
1.	Francisco Cabedo	4	12', 20', 35', 60'	Catalonia	6–3	Centro	1916 Prince of Asturias Cup	11 May 1916	

=== Braces ===
Zabala and Monjardín, the competition's top scorers, also hold the record for the most braces, with two each. Cubells, Monjardín, and Herrera are the only ones to have scored a brace for a losing side.

Ramón Herrera scored the fastest brace in the competition with 2 goals in 2 minutes, while Josep Samitier's brace needed 3 minutes to be completed. Kinké also scored a very quick brace of around 5 minutes.

Rogelio Barril is the only one to have scored a brace in extra-time with goals in the 125th and 144th.

=== Other goalscoring records ===
Although the competition failed to serve as the basis for the formation of a Spanish team, many of the players who participated in this inter-regional competition earned caps for Spain, in fact, a total of 11 players have managed to score at both the Prince of Asturias Cup and at international level for Spain: Patricio, Domingo Acedo, Paulino Alcántara, Manuel Meana, Travieso, Vicente Piera, Juan Monjardín, José Luis Zabala, Josep Samitier, Carmelo and Eduardo Cubells, with Patricio and Alcántara being the only ones who scored in the first phase of the Prince of Asturias Cup (1915–18). Only 5 players have managed to score multiple goals on both sides: Alcántara (2/6), Travieso (3/2), Monjardín (6/3), Zabala (6/4), and Samitier (4/2).

The only players to have scored in both phases of the Prince of Asturias Cup are Paulino Alcántara (1915 and 1926), Antonio de Miguel (1916 and 1923–24) and Kinké (1916 and 1922–23/1923–24).

=== Other records ===
Eulogio Aranguren and Enrique Peris hold the peculiar distinction of being the only ones to have participated in the Prince of Asturias Cup as both a player and referee: Both of them played in the first edition of the competition with Centro and Catalonia respectively, and then, both refereed one quarter-final in the 1922–23 edition.

Joaquín Pascual holds the unwanted distinction of being the only player to have scored an own goal in the competition. He was Centro's goalkeeper and in a game against Cantabric on 11 May 1917, he netted an own goal under unknown circumstances, fortunately, his side managed to hold on to a 3–2 win.

== Legacy ==
The Prince of Asturias Cup was one of the tournaments that left a pleasant and lasting memory with the fans, however, the selfishness of the clubs and local quarrels did not allow the tournament to take root in Spain. If the Cup had persevered and kept its original purpose, the tournament may have grown to become a noted event on the Spanish football calendar.

== See also ==
UEFA Regions' Cup
