= 1918 Copa del Rey =

18th Copa del Rey

Tournament details
- Country: Spain
- Teams: 6

Final positions
- Champions: Real Unión (1st title)
- Runners-up: Madrid FC

Tournament statistics
- Matches played: 8
- Goals scored: 25 (3.13 per match)
- Top goal scorer(s): Santiago Bernabéu; Manuel Posada (4 goals)

The Copa del Rey 1918 was the 18th staging of the Copa del Rey, the Spanish football cup competition.

The competition started on 8 April 1918, and concluded on 2 May 1918 with the final, held at the O'Donnell in Madrid, in which Real Unión lifted the trophy for the first time (second time counting the trophy won by Racing de Irun in 1913) with a 2–0 victory over Madrid FC with Juan Legarreta netting both goals for Unión.

== Teams ==
- North Region: Real Unión
- Central Region: Madrid FC
- South Region: Recreativo de Huelva
- Galicia Region: Fortuna de Vigo
- Asturias Region: Sporting de Gijón
- Catalonia Region: RCD Español

== Quarter-finals ==
Recreativo de Huelva and Fortuna de Vigo received a bye to the semi-finals. Real Unión and Sporting Gijón played a single match at a neutral venue, instead of a two-legged tie.

=== First leg ===
8 April 1918

RCD Español	3–0	Madrid FC
Lorenzo Alvarado 3'; Clemente Gràcia 30', 40'	Report

Camp de la Indústria, Barcelona
Referee: (Spain) Enrique Salvó

=== Second leg ===
14 April 1918

Madrid FC	1–0	RCD Español
Santiago Bernabéu (1T)	Report

Campo de O'Donnell (Atlético Madrid), Madrid
Referee: (Spain) Ezequiel Montero

RCD Español and Madrid CF won one match each. At that year, the goal difference was not taken into account. A replay match was played.

=== Replay ===
16 April 1918

Madrid FC	2–1	RCD Español
Manuel Posada 5'; Santiago Bernabéu 10'	Report	Clemente Gràcia 40'

Campo de O'Donnell (Atlético Madrid), Madrid
Referee: (Spain) Federico Larrañaga

Madrid FC advanced to the semi-finals

=== One-legged game ===
7 May 1918

Real Unión	4–1	Sporting de Gijón
Agustín Amantegui 10'; René Petit 20', 30' (pen.), 40' (pen.)	Report	Senén Villaverde III 50' (pen.)

Campo de O'Donnell (Atlético Madrid), Madrid
Referee: (Spain) José Torrens

This was a one-legged match, played on neutral ground. Real Unión advanced to the semi-finals.

== Semifinals ==
=== First leg ===
21 April 1918

Recreativo de Huelva	0–2	Madrid FC
	Report	Manuel Posada; Santiago Bernabéu

Huelva
Referee: (Spain) Juan Artola

=== Second leg ===
28 April 1918

Madrid FC	4–0	Recreativo de Huelva
Ricardo Álvarez 40' (pen.); Manuel Posada 45', 70'; Santiago Bernabéu 60'	Report

Campo de O'Donnell (Atlético Madrid), Madrid
Referee: (Spain) Federico Larrañaga

Madrid FC won 2–0 on aggregate matches.

=== One-legged game ===
9 May 1918

Real Unión	4–1	Fortuna de Vigo
Patricio 20', 70'; Pepe Angoso 40', 60'	Report	Enrique Domínguez "Catalán" 83'

Campo de O'Donnell (Atlético Madrid), Madrid
Referee: (Spain) Enrique Peris

This was a one-legged match, played on neutral ground, and it was Real Unión who advanced to the final with a 4–1 win.

== Final ==
12 May 1918
17:00 CET

Real Unión	2–0	Madrid FC
Juan Legarreta 45', 85'	Report

Estadio O'Donnell, Madrid
Referee: Francisco Torrens

Copa del Rey 1918 winners
Real Unión
1st title
