= Francesc Cabedo =

Spanish footballer

Personal information
- Birth name: Francesc Cabedo
- Date of birth: 1897
- Place of birth: Spain
- Date of death: Unknown
- Place of death: Unknown
- Position: Defender

Senior career*
Years	Team	Apps	(Gls)
1913–1914	FC Internacional		
1914–1927	CE Sabadell FC	247	(142)

International career
1916–1924	Catalonia	+10	(+4)
Medal record
Catalonia
Prince of Asturias Cup
Gold medal – first place	1916 Prince of Asturias Cup	Team
- * Club domestic league appearances and goals

Francesc Cabedo was a Spanish footballer who played as a defender. He spent 14 seasons of his playing career with Sabadell FC. He also played for the Catalan national team between 1916 and 1924.

== Playing career ==
=== Club career ===
Cabedo started playing football at the age of 12 in Montserrat, living in Hostafrancs, a neighborhood in the Sants-Montjuïc district of Barcelona, Catalonia. In 1913, he was signed by FC Internacional, playing in the first team first as a right winger, and later as a defender. In his first (and only) season at the club, Cabedo helped them finish as runner-up of the Catalan championship, only behind FC Espanya and ahead of RCD Espanyol and FC Barcelona.

Right at the end of the 1913–14 season, he was signed by CE Sabadell, who had just proclaimed themselves champions of the second division, winning a place in the Catalan top division. During the time he played at the club, he played center forward, center half, and finally defense, becoming the club's main player and team captain from 1919. In his first season as captain, he led Sabadell to its best-ever result, a runner-up finish at the 1919–20 Catalan championship, only behind FC Barcelona. He remained at the Valais club for the rest of his football career until 1927, where he formed an outstanding defensive partnership with Joaquín Montané. In total, he played with CF Badalona for 14 seasons, thus becoming a local hero of the club.

Cabedo always showed his commitment to the club and the fans, as evidenced by the statement he made when FC Barcelona showed their interest in him, saying: "Mientras juegue al fútbol lo haré en el Sabadell" (As long as I play football I will do it in Sabadell), a word he fulfilled as he retired at Sabadell in 1927.

In August 1922, Cabedo was the subject of a tribute with a match between Sabadell and Terrassa FC. On 26 September 1926, he was the subject of a new tribute with the dispute of a match between the Catalan national team and Sabadell.

On 18 August 1929, he took charge of Sabadell's second team.

=== International career ===
As a Sabadell player, Cabedo was eligible to play for the Catalan national team, and in May 1916, together with FC Barcelona's Paulino Alcántara, Josep Samitier and Ricardo Zamora, he was part of the great Catalan side of the twenties that won the second edition of the Prince of Asturias Cup, an inter-regional competition organized by the RFEF. In the opening game against a Castile/Madrid XI, he scored a poker in a 6–3 victory, thus becoming the first (and only) player to score a hat-trick in the competition's history, with his four goals in a single match remaining a record in the Prince of Asturias Cup. He then also started in the decisive match, which ended in a 2–2 draw that was enough for the Catalans to win the cup for the first time. Even though he did not score again, those four goals were enough to secure the accolade of top scorer of the tournament, ahead of Juan "Kinké" Armet, who scored three goals.

Cabedo played a few more matches for the Catalan national side, becoming one of the most capped Catalan players between 1916 and 1924, however, due to the little statistical rigor that the newspapers had at that time, the exact amount of caps he earned is unknown.

The date of his death is also unknown.

== Later life ==
Lluis Papell wrote a poem about him, which he published in the Catalan magazine l'Esforç in 1920:

"Oh el defensa més defensa dels defenses que han sortit,
que juga igual quan comença que quan acaba un partit;
que té una entrada terrible i una empenta colossal!
Oh el gran Cabedo invencible, coratjós, fort i lleial!
Tira els penals tan directes tan precisos i perfectes que un penal sempre és un gol.
La seva pèrdua sería dolorosa i sembraría la d’un altre Monistrol.

— Lluis Papell in 1920

O defender most defender of defenders that have gone forth,
who plays the same way when a game starts and when it ends;
that has a terrible entrance and a colossal push!
Oh the great Cabedo invincible, brave, strong and loyal!
He takes penalties so direct so precise and perfect that a penalty is always a goal.
His loss would be painful and would sow that of another Monistrol.

— Lluis Papell in 1920

== Honours ==
=== Club ===
FC Internacional

- Catalan championship:
  - Runner-up (1): 1913–1914

Sabadell FC

- Catalan championship:
  - Runner-up (1): 1919–1920

=== International ===
Catalonia

- Prince of Asturias Cup:
  - Champion (1): 1916
