= Carmelo Goyenechea =

Spanish footballer (1898–1984)

Carmelo
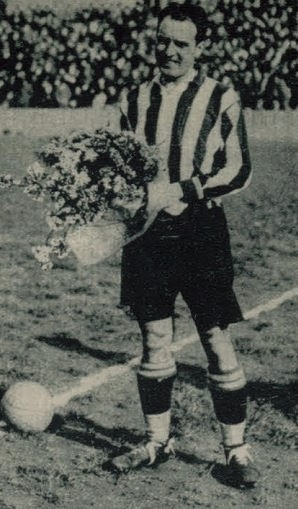

Personal information
- Full name: Carmelo Goyenechea Urrusolo
- Date of birth: 18 June 1898
- Place of birth: Deusto, Spain
- Date of death: 10 November 1984 (aged 86)
- Place of death: Bilbao, Spain

Senior career*
Years	Team	Apps	(Gls)
1916–1921	SD Deusto		
1921–1929	Athletic Bilbao		

International career
1920–1924	Biscay	6	(3)
1922-1928	Spain	10	(3)
- * Club domestic league appearances and goals

Carmelo Goyenechea Urrusolo (18 June 1898 - 10 November 1984) was a Spanish footballer. He competed in the men's tournament at the 1924 Summer Olympics.

== Club career ==
Born in Bilbao in 1898, he began playing for his hometown club SD Deusto until 1921, when he signed for Athletic Bilbao. He played with them for the next eight seasons, becoming one of the team's vital components and helping them win five Biscay Championships and a Copa del Rey in 1923, defeating CD Europa 1–0 in the final with a goal from Travieso. For several years he served as the Athletic captain.

He retired after playing in the first season of La Liga in 1929, in which he played 15 games and scored 6 goals.

== International career ==
He earned 10 caps for Spain, making his debut in Lisbon against Portugal on 17 December 1922, and it was at that same venue and against those opponents that Carmelo would score his first international goal three years later, in a 2–0 win on 17 May 1925. He scored twice more for Spain, including the winner in a 1–0 victory over Hungary on 4 October 1925.

As an Athletic Bilbao player, he was eligible to play for the Biscay representative team, being part of the squad that participated in the Prince of Asturias Cup tournaments in the early 20s, scoring once in the 1923–24 edition as Biscay beat Asturias 4–2, thus reaching the semi-finals where they were eliminated by Catalonia due to an early goal from Cristóbal Martí.

=== International goals ===
==== Spain ====
Spain score listed first, score column indicates score after each Carmelo goal.

List of international goals scored by Carmelo Goyenechea
No.	Date	Venue	Opponent	Score	Result	Competition
1	17 May 1925	Estádio do Lumiar, Lisbon, Portugal	Portugal	1–0	2–0	Friendly
2	4 October 1925	Üllői úti stadion, Budapest, Hungary	Hungary	1–0	1–0	Friendly
3	19 December 1926	Coia, Vigo, Spain	Hungary	3–1	4–2	Friendly

==== Biscay ====
Biscay score listed first, score column indicates score after each Carmelo goal.

List of international goals scored by Carmelo Goyenechea
No.	Date	Venue	Opponent	Score	Result	Competition
1	31 January 1920	Camp del carrer Muntaner, Barcelona, Spain	Catalonia		1–2	Friendly
2	1 February 1920	Camp de la Indústria, Barcelona, Spain	Catalonia		1–3	Friendly
3	18 November 1923	San Mamés, Bilbao, Spain	Asturias	1–0	4–2	1923-24 Prince of Asturias Cup quarter-finals

== Honours ==
=== Club ===
Athletic Bilbao

Copa del Rey:

- Winners (1) 1923

Biscay Championship:

- Winners (5) 1923, 1924, 1926, 1928 and 1929
