= Ramón Herrera (footballer) =

Spanish footballer

Personal information
- Full name: Ramón Herrera Bueno
- Date of birth: 13 April 1907
- Place of birth: Gijón, Asturias, Spain
- Date of death: 4 October 1960 (aged 53)
- Position: Center-forward

Senior career*
Years	Team	Apps	(Gls)
1925–1927	Sporting de Gijón		
1927–1929	Atlético Madrid		(13)
1929–1930	Real Betis		
1930–1935	Sporting de Gijón		

International career
1926–1934	Asturias	+2	(2)
Medal record
Asturias
Prince of Asturias Cup
Gold medal – first place	1926 Prince of Asturias Cup	Team
- * Club domestic league appearances and goals

Ramón Herrera Bueno (13 April 1907 in Gijón – 4 October 1960), also known as el Sabio (Spanish for The wise) was a Spanish footballer who played as a center-forward. His younger brother, Eduardo, was Real Oviedo's all-time top scorer in La Liga, with 117 goals in 213 games.

== Club career ==
Born in Gijón, he began his career in 1925, aged 18, at his hometown club Sporting de Gijón in 1925, playing as a center-forward. His career was heavily affected by a disease known as Syphilis, which was deadly at the time with devastating physical effects. At the time, center-forwards usually were corpulent, aggressive and impetuous players, but Herrera, in poor physical condition, revolutionized the way of playing as a forward striker, imposing his talent, his technique with the ball, his off-the-ball movement and intuition to position himself in the right place, thus earning the nickname "El Sabio" from his contemporaries. His talent eventually drew the attention of Atlético Madrid, who signed him in 1927.

In the 1927–28 season with Atlético, there were many games in which he seemed unable to move; but in the ones where he was unbothered by his disease, he was as great as he was in his best afternoons at Sporting. After three seasons at the club in which he managed 13 goals, Herrera went to Real Betis in 1929, but played on few occasions, because he was hospitalized for many months trying to alleviate his illness. He returned to Sporting de Gijón in 1930, where he spent his last seasons as a footballer, before being forced to retire in 1935, aged 28. Many believe that he could have achieved even more than his brother, Eduardo (Real Oviedo's all-time top scorer in La Liga), if not for his disease.

== International career ==
Being a Sporting de Gijón player, he was summoned to play for the Asturias national team several times, and in September 1926, he was a member of the team that participated in the final edition of the Prince of Asturias Cup, an inter-regional competition organized by the RFEF. The tournament was a two legged final between the previous two champions, Asturias and Catalonia, for the right to keep the trophy, and after losing 0–2 in the first leg, they found themselves trailing 1–4 in the 80th minute of the second leg at Guinardó, and all Herrera was able to do was to close the gap with two goals in two minutes to seal a 3–4 loss. This was the fastest brace in the competition's history, and these two goals earned him a spot in the top scorers of the tournament alongside Domingo Broto and Josep Forgas, who also scored two goals, but for Catalonia.

== Retirement ==
When the Spanish Civil War broke out in 1936, he immediately decided to enlist with the nationals and repel the Republican troops from his land. He was present in the Battle of the Sierra del Naranco. Throughout the war, he developed a strange attraction to risk, most-likely because his disease had taken the fear of death away from him. It has been commented on several occasions that from the trench he exhorted the enemy with phrases such as "Here you have the magician of the ball, shoot him". In the end, the city of Oviedo did not resist the siege and ended up being taken (or freed) by Franco's troops, and Herrera lamented that there hadn't been a bullet for him. So, he continued his military adventures and in World War II he decided to enlist as a volunteer in the Blue Division, going to fight the USSR, but he did not find death there either, so he returned to Spain to work in a Shipping agency company, and as a hobby he earned some extra money doing crossword puzzles for various publications in Barcelona. Sporting would give him a tribute match in 1950 and he would die 10 years later.

== Death ==
On 4 October 1960, Herrera committed suicide with barbiturates, which he put in his food. The disease, already incurable despite penicillin, was what pushed him to the final decision. There was a police investigation, as it was suspected that it could have been a murder, but both the restaurant where he ate, always alone, and the waitress who usually served him, were declared innocent.

== Honours ==
=== International ===
Asturias

Prince of Asturias Cup:

- Runner-up (1): 1926
