= Domingo Massagué =

Spanish footballer (1900–1979)

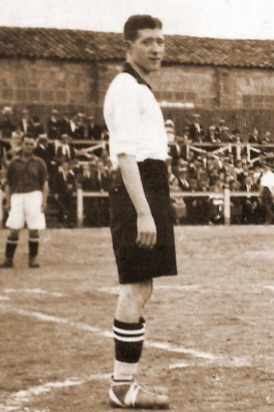

Personal information
- Full name: Domingo Massagué Casasayas
- Birth name: Domènec Massagué i Casasayas
- Date of birth: 4 December 1900
- Place of birth: Terrassa, Catalonia, Kingdom of Spain
- Date of death: 17 August 1979 (aged 78)
- Place of death: Barcelona, Catalonia, Spain
- Position: Defender

Youth career
- 1913–1917: UD Terrassa

Senior career*
Years	Team	Apps	(Gls)
1917–1928	Terrassa FC		
1928–1929	FC Barcelona	0	(10)
1929–1930	UE Sants		

International career
1924–1932	Catalonia	10	(0)
Medal record
Catalonia
Prince of Asturias Cup
Silver medal – second place	1923–24 Prince of Asturias Cup	Team
- * Club domestic league appearances and goals

Domingo Massagué Casasayas (born Domènec Massagué i Casasayas; 4 December 1900 – 17 August 1979) was a Spanish footballer who played as a defender for FC Barcelona.

== Club career ==
Born in Terrassa, Massagué began playing football in 1914, in the children's school of Unió Deportiva Terrassa. He mainly stood out at Terrassa FC, a club where he played for more than a decade and was one of its most prominent pillars. He played a crucial role in helping the club win the Catalan Primera Championship (Second division) in the 1923–24 season and the 1925 Copa Catalunya. His constant series of solid defensive performances eventually earned him a move to FC Barcelona at the end of the 1920s, a club with which he played 10 friendly matches and with the reserve team. He finished his career at UE Sants.

== International career ==
Like many other Catalan players of his time, he was eligible to play for the Catalonia national team, and he was summoned several times, forming defensive partnerships with the likes of Joaquín Montané, Ricardo Saprissa or Pedro Serra. He helped the Catalan team win the 1923–24 Prince of Asturias Cup, an inter-regional competition organized by the RFEF. Montané was a starter in the replay of the infamous final of the 1923–24 edition against a Castile/Madrid XI, where Catalonia came out as 3–2 winners.

== Honours ==
=== Club ===
UE Sants

- Catalan Championship Second division: 1923–24
- Copa Catalunya: 1925

Catalonia

- Prince of Asturias Cup: 1923–24
