= José Agüero =

José Agüero may refer to:

- José Agüero (Brazilian tennis player) (born 1933), Brazilian tennis player of the 1950s.
- José Agüero (Cuban tennis player), Cuban tennis player of the 1940s.
- José Agüero (footballer), Spanish footballer for Athletic Club de Madrid and Racing de Santander.
