= Francesco Sanahuja =

Spanish footballer (1899–1973)

Personal information
- Full name: Francesco Sanahuja Ros
- Date of birth: 23 August 1899
- Place of birth: Ribesalbes, Spain
- Date of death: 22 February 1973 (aged 73)
- Position: Midfielder

Senior career*
Years	Team	Apps	(Gls)
1916–1922	FC Internacional		
1922–1926	Espanyol		

International career
1920–1924	Catalonia	+7	(0)
Medal record
Catalonia
Prince of Asturias Cup
Gold medal – first place	1923–24 Prince of Asturias Cup	Team
- * Club domestic league appearances and goals

Francesco Sanahuja Ros (23 August 1899 – 22 February 1973) was a Spanish footballer who played as a midfielder for Espanyol and the Catalan national team in the mid-1920s.

== Club career ==
Born on 23 August 1899 in Ribesalbes, a town in the Province of Castellón, Sanahuja began his career at FC Internacional, from which he joined Espanyol in 1922, with whom he played 27 official matches, including 25 in the Catalan championship.

== International career ==
As an Internacional player, Sanahuja was eligible to play for the Catalan national team, making his debut in early 1920, in two friendlies against Biscay, helping his side to two victories; the following day, the journalists of the Spanish newspaper Mundo Deportivo stated that neither he nor Estebán Pelaó were "in a position to represent the region in matches of this magnitude, although they nonetheless honored their excellent will and abilities". He had to wait a year for his next appearance on 9 February 1921, serving as a replacement to Josep Samitier in a friendly against a French Sud-oest selection at the Camp de la Indústria. Two months later, in April 1921, he played two friendlies against the Provence football team, helping his side to two victories. A few months later, on 4 September, he started for Catalonia against Barcelona in a match for the benefit of the victims of the Rif War; Catalonia lost 3–0 loss.

After a three-year hiatus, Sanahuja was called-up for Catalonia again in 1924, being part of the great Catalonia side, which also included the likes of Paulino Alcántara, Josep Samitier and Ricardo Zamora, that won the 1923–24 Prince of Asturias Cup, an inter-regional competition organized by the RFEF. Some reports list him as one of the eleven footballers who represented Catalonia in the infamous final against a Castile/Madrid XI, helping his side salvage a 4–4 draw, and then being a substitute in the replay as Catalonia won the second Prince of Asturias Cup title in their history.

== Honours ==
Catalonia

Prince of Asturias Cup:

- Champions (1): 1924
