= Antonio de Miguel (footballer, born 1896) =

Spanish footballer

Personal information
- Full name: Antonio de Miguel Postigo
- Date of birth: 1896
- Place of birth: Madrid, Spain
- Date of death: 24 November 1936 (aged 40)
- Position: Forward

Senior career*
Years	Team	Apps	(Gls)
1914–1916	Racing de Madrid		
1916–1920	Madrid FC		
1920–1924	Real Madrid		
1924–1929	Athletic Madrid		

International career
1916–1924	Madrid	+8	(+2)
Medal record
Madrid
Prince of Asturias Cup
Gold medal – first place	1918 Prince of Asturias Cup	Team
Silver medal – second place	1916 Prince of Asturias Cup	Team
Silver medal – second place	1923–24 Prince of Asturias Cup	Team
- * Club domestic league appearances and goals

Antonio de Miguel Postigo (1896 – 24 November 1936) was a Spanish footballer who played as a forward for Real Madrid and Atlético Madrid.

== Club career ==
Born in Madrid, he began his career at his hometown club Racing de Madrid in 1914, aged 17 or 18, where he played as a midfielder, featuring alongside Joaquín Pascual, Ezequiel Montero, Ricardo Álvarez, and Feliciano Rey, with the latter two also being his teammates at Madrid FC. He played a crucial role in helping the club win the 1914–15 Centro Championship.

After two great seasons at Racing, he was signed by Madrid FC, with whom he played for 8 seasons, in which the highlight of his career was winning the 1917 Copa del Rey Final against Arenas de Getxo. He remained loyal to the club for 8 years until 1924, when the club's board of directors decided that the low form of an aging de Miguel did not allow him to continue defending the colours of Madrid, and thus, he ended up in the neighboring club, Atlético Madrid.

In his first season at Atlético, he contributed decisively in helping them win the 1924–25 Centro Championship four points clear of Madrid FC, thus proving he was not too old after all, and unlike what Real might have thought, de Miguel played a further five seasons with Athletic before retiring in 1929, being also pivotal in helping the club reach the 1926 Copa del Rey Final which they lost 2–3.

== International career ==
Like many other FC Madrid players of that time, he played several matches for the Madrid national team during the 1910s and 1920s, however, due to the little statistical rigor that the newspapers had at that time, the exact amount of caps he earned is unknown. He was part of the Madrid side that participated in the second edition of the Prince of Asturias Cup in 1916, an inter-regional competition organized by the RFEF. The following edition of the tournament coincided with the 1917 Copa del Rey Final between Madrid FC and Arenas, which prevented the Madrid national side from using the Madrid FC players, and thus, they had to call the "second options", of which his brother Pablo De Miguel, was a part of, and despite being a weaker side, they won the tournament for the first time in Madrid's history. De Miguel was then a member of the team that won the 1918 edition, starting in both games against Cantabric as Madrid won their second title in a row.

De Miguel also represented Centro in both the 1922–23 and 1923–24 tournaments, and on the latter he scored the only goal in the quarter-finals against Galicia, and he started in the infamous final against Catalonia which ended in a 4–4 draw, but did not play in the replay two days later, and without him the Centro team was beaten 2–3.

== Honours ==
=== Club ===
Racing de Madrid

- Centro Championship
  - Winners (1): 1914–15

Madrid FC

- Centro Championship:
  - Winners (6): 1916–17, 1917–18, 1919–20, 1921–22, 1922–23 and 1923–24
- Copa del Rey:
  - Winners (1): 1917

Athletic Madrid

- Centro Championship:
  - Winners (1): 1924–25
- Copa del Rey:
  - Runner-up (1): 1926

=== International ===
Madrid

- Prince of Asturias Cup:
  - Champions (1): 1918
  - Runner-up (2): 1916 and 1923–24
