= José Legarreta =

Spanish footballer

Personal information
- Full name: José Legarreta Abaitua
- Date of birth: 12 February 1903
- Place of birth: Larrabetzu, Spain
- Date of death: 17 September 1957 (aged 54)
- Place of death: Bilbao, Spain
- Position: Midfielder

Youth career
- 1921–1922: Athletic Bilbao

Senior career*
Years	Team	Apps	(Gls)
1922–1929	Athletic Bilbao	16	(0)

International career
1928	Spain	1	(0)
- * Club domestic league appearances and goals

José Legarreta Abaitua (12 February 1903 – 17 September 1957) was a Spanish footballer who represented his nation at the 1928 Summer Olympics in the Netherlands.

== Career statistics ==
=== Club ===
As of games played 1930.

Club	Season	League			Cup		Continental		Other		Total	
Club	Season	Division	Apps	Goals	Apps	Goals	Apps	Goals	Apps	Goals	Apps	Goals
Athletic Bilbao	1922–23	–	0	0	5	0	–		9	0	14	0
Athletic Bilbao	1923–24	–	0	0	4	0	–		9	0	13	0
Athletic Bilbao	1924–25	–	0	0	0	0	–		10	1	10	1
Athletic Bilbao	1925–26	–	0	0	4	0	–		9	1	13	1
Athletic Bilbao	1926–27	–	0	0	3	0	–		9	0	12	0
Athletic Bilbao	1927–28	–	0	0	6	0	–		4	1	10	1
Athletic Bilbao	1928–29	Primera División	16	0	8	0	–		5	0	29	0
Career total			16	0	30	0	0	0	55	3	101	3
