= Jesús Pedret =

Spanish footballer (1905–1933)

Personal information
- Full name: Jesús Pedret González
- Date of birth: 1905
- Place of birth: Barcelona, Spain
- Date of death: 29 June 1933 (aged 27–28)
- Place of death: Spain
- Position: Goalkeeper

Senior career*
Years	Team	Apps	(Gls)
1922–1926	Sants		
1926–1930	Valencia	22	(0)

International career
1925	Spain	0	(0)
1921–1926	Catalonia	4	(0)
- * Club domestic league appearances and goals

Jesús Pedret González (1905 – 29 June 1933) was a Spanish footballer who played as a goalkeeper for Valencia in the late 1920s. He also played four matches for the Catalan national team and was called up to the Spain national team in the mid-1920s, but never made his debut.

== Club career ==
Born in the Catalonian town of Barcelona in 1905, Pedret began his career at his hometown club Sants in 1922, aged 17, with whom he played for five years, until 1927, when he was signed by Valencia, which had been impressed by his performances in Algirós in 1922 and Mestalla in 1925. This move, however, was controversial, since Pedret did it without Sants' consent, signing under the pseudonym "Olegario", which caused some reports to list Olegario as Pedret's substitute in the 1926–27 squad. This deception resulted in a federal case, which was quite notorious at the time because Pedret had recently established himself as Spain's second-choice behind Ricardo Zamora.

Despite being short, Pedret made up for it through his positioning expertise, coupled with his great agility and reflexes. He remained at Valencia for four seasons, from 1926 until 1930, playing as an undisputed starter in the first three seasons, but being sidelined by Enrique Cano in the fourth. In 1930, Pedret returned to his hometown of Barcelona, where he contracted a serious illness that forced him to retire at the age of 25. He was then the subject of a tribute match held by Sants on 10 August 1931.

== International career ==
In September and October 1925, Pedret was called up to the Spain national team for two friendly matches against Austria and Hungary, in which he did not play a single minute due to the presence of Ricardo Zamora.

As a Sants player, Pedret was eligible to play for the Catalan national team, which summoned him four times in 1926, making his debut during Catalonia's European mini-tour in July 1926, starting in a 1–2 loss to a Czechoslovakia XI in Prague, and against a Zurich XI on 11 July, which ended in a 5–2 win. The following day, the journalists of the Spanish newspaper Mundo Deportivo stated that "Pedret, without achieving the brilliance of the previous Wednesday in the Czechoslovak capital, due to the reduced number of chances in front of his goal, continued to be a reliable and effective goalkeeper".

Together with Paulino Alcántara, Josep Samitier and Ricardo Zamora, he was part of the Catalonia team that won the Prince of Asturias Cup in 1926, an inter-regional competition organized by the RFEF, beating Asturias 4–3 in the final.

== Death ==
Pedret died on 29 June 1933, at the age of 28.

== Honours ==
Catalonia

- Prince of Asturias Cup:
  - Champions (1): 1926
