= Ezequiel Montero =

Spanish footballer (1893–1972)

Personal information
- Full name: Ezequiel Montero Román
- Date of birth: 22 February 1893
- Place of birth: Madrid, Spain
- Date of death: 17 April 1972 (aged 79)
- Place of death: Madrid, Spain
- Position: Midfielder

Senior career*
Years	Team	Apps	(Gls)
1914–1918	Racing de Madrid		

International career
1915–1918	Madrid	+4	(0)

Managerial career
- 1926–1927: Spain
Medal record
Madrid
Prince of Asturias Cup
Gold medal – first place	1917 Prince of Asturias Cup	Team
Gold medal – first place	1918 Prince of Asturias Cup	Team
- * Club domestic league appearances and goals

Ezequiel Montero Román (Note: In this Spanish name, the first or paternal surname is Montero and the second or maternal family name is Román.) (22 February 1893 – 17 April 1972) was a Spanish footballer, referee and manager in Spain at the beginning of the 20th century. As a player, he helped the Madrid national team win two Prince of Asturias Cups in 1917 and 1918. As a coach, he managed the Spain national team in four games between 1926 and 1927.

== Playing career ==
Montero was born at the beginning of 1893 in Madrid, a city in which he would develop an extensive career linked to football. In the 1910s, he played as a midfielder for Racing de Madrid, with whom he won the 1914–15 Centro Championship together with Joaquín Pascual, Ricardo Álvarez and Feliciano Rey. Since he was a Racing de Madrid player, he was eligible to play for the Madrid national team, for whom he played several matches between 1915 and 1918, being a member of the side that participated in the first edition of the Prince of Asturias Cup in 1915, an official inter-regional competition organized by the RFEF. Montero was also a member of the Madrid team captained by José María Castell, which against all odds, claimed the trophy in the 1917 Prince of Asturias Cup, which was the first in Madrid's history.

== Refereeing career ==
Montero began his refereeing career when he was still an active player, which was normal at the time. In 1915, after satisfactory examinations, he joined the Board of the College of Referees of the Center, the first College of Referees in Spain, roughly at the same time as the likes of Carlos Dieste and of then-teammate at Racing, Antonio Pelous. According to posting practice, he also performed regular service as a coastal judge.

As a referee, he oversaw matches of the Central Championship, and even of the Copa del Rey. He was a referee in the first-ever Spanish league in 1929, refereeing 22 matches in the Primera División (1929–1942). In total, he oversaw more than 100 matches between the Regional, First and Second Division, in a career that lasted more than 30 years (1915–1947).

Together with Eulogio Aranguren and Enrique Peris, he holds the peculiar distinction of having participated in the Prince of Asturias Cup as both a player and referee, given that Montero refereed one match in the competition, a semi-final between Galicia and Andalusia in the 1922–23 edition, ending in a 4–1 win to the Galicians.

At the request of the Portuguese Football Federation (FPF), he acted as a referee in the 1922 Campeonato de Portugal, which was the 1st edition of the Portuguese domestic cup. This match was a derby between Sporting CP and FC Porto, ending in a 2–0 win to the "Lions".

== Coaching career ==
Between 1926 and 1927 Montero was the manager of the Spain national team, leading the nation in four games that ended in three wins and one loss.

== Honours ==
Racing de Madrid

- Centro Championship: 1914–15

Madrid XI

- Prince of Asturias Cup: 1917, 1918

== See also ==
List of Spain national football team managers
