= Josep Gumbau =

Spanish footballer

Personal information
- Date of birth: Unknown
- Place of birth: Catalonia, Spain
- Date of death: Unknown
- Position: Forward

Senior career*
Years	Team	Apps	(Gls)
1916–1917	FC Martinenc		
1917–1918	FC Barcelona	35	(19)
1918–1921	FC Martinenc		
1921–1924	CE Júpiter		

International career
1917	Catalonia	5	(2)
Medal record
Catalonia
Prince of Asturias Cup
Silver medal – second place	1917 Prince of Asturias Cup	Team
- * Club domestic league appearances and goals

Josep Gumbau was a Spanish footballer who played as a forward. The dates of his birth and death are unknown.

== Club career ==
Born in Catalonia, Gumbau began his career at FC Martinenc, where he stood out for his goalscoring ability. He signed for FC Barcelona in 1917 and scored 19 goals in 35 caps before he returned to Martinenc after the 1917–18 season. In 1921, Gumbau joined CE Júpiter, where he ended his career in 1924.

== International career ==
When he joined FC Barcelona in 1917, Gumbau was summoned to play for the Catalonia national team, being a member of the Catalan side that participated in the 1917 Prince of Asturias Cup, an inter-regional competition organized by the RFEF. Gumbau started in all three games and scored twice, in a 2–2 draw with Castile/Madrid XI and the only goal of a 1–0 over Cantabric. Catalonia ended up as runner-ups after losing the decisive game to Madrid (0-2).

== Honours ==
=== International ===
Catalonia

- Prince of Asturias Cup:
  - Runner-up (1): 1917
