= Josep Forgas =

Spanish footballer

Personal information
- Full name: Josep Forgas Teixidó
- Date of birth: 16 December 1904
- Place of birth: Olot, Girona, Spain
- Date of death: Unknown
- Position: Forward

Senior career*
Years	Team	Apps	(Gls)
1922–1924	UE Figueres		
1924–1941	CF Badalona	247	(142)

International career
1926–1933	Catalonia	+2	(+2)
Medal record
Catalonia
Prince of Asturias Cup
Gold medal – first place	1926 Prince of Asturias Cup	Team
- * Club domestic league appearances and goals

Josep Forgas Teixidó (16 December 1904 – Unknown) was a Spanish footballer who played as a forward. The dates of his birth and death are unknown. He spent all 17 seasons of his playing career with CF Badalona, thus being a historical member of the club and part of the so-called one-club men group.

== Biography ==
Born in Girona, Forgas was a young man when he moved to Figueres, where he started playing at a club called Emporium. He then signed for UE Figueres, where he played for two seasons, between 1922 and 1924, when he moved to Badalona, where he joined the local club. In total, he played with CF Badalona for 17 seasons, for whom he scored 142 goals in 247 caps, thus making him a legend of the club.

As a Badalona, Forgas was eligible to play for the Catalan national team, and together with FC Barcelona's Paulino Alcántara, Josep Samitier and Ricardo Zamora, he was part of the great Catalan side of the twenties that won the last edition of the Prince of Asturias Cup, an inter-regional competition organized by the RFEF. The tournament consisted of a two-legged tie against Asturias for the right to keep the trophy, and after a 2–0 win at Gijón, Forgas netted a brace in a 4–3 win at Barcelona, thus contributing decisively in helping Catalonia to win a record-breaking third Prince of Asturias Cup title. With these two goals, he was the top scorer of the tournament alongside Ramón Herrera and teammate Domingo Broto, who also scored two goals.

Forgas played a further two matches for the Catalan national side, the first in 1931, and later in 1934.

== Honours ==
Catalonia

- Prince of Asturias Cup:
  - Champion (1): 1926
