= Pedro Serra (footballer) =

Spanish footballer

Personal information
- Full name: Pedro Serra Andreu
- Date of birth: 23 May 1899
- Place of birth: Reus, Catalonia, Spain
- Date of death: 9 March 1983 (aged 83)
- Place of death: Catalonia, Spain
- Position: Defender

Youth career
- 1914-1917: CE Europa

Senior career*
Years	Team	Apps	(Gls)
1917–1929	CE Europa		

International career
1925-29	Catalonia	+3	(0)
Medal record
Catalonia
Prince of Asturias Cup
Gold medal – first place	1926 Prince of Asturias Cup	Team
- * Club domestic league appearances and goals

Pedro Serra Andreu (23 May 1899 - 9 March 1983) was a Spanish footballer who played as a defender. A historical member of CE Europa in the 1920s, he was one of the first footballers to play for Europa for his entire career, and thus to be part of the so-called one-club men group.

== Club career ==
Born in Reus, Catalonia, he moved to Gràcia district of Barcelona at the age of 9. He began playing football at the lesser teams of CE Europa in 1914, but it only took him three years to reach the first team of the club. He was a member of the great CE Europa side of the 1920s that included figures such as Pelaó, Pellicer, Alcázar and Cros, helping the team win the Catalan Championship in 1923 and to reach the 1923 Copa del Rey Final, where they were beaten 0-1 by Athletic Bilbao. He was kept away from the pitch by a long injury of six months, making his return in March 1929.

== International career ==
Being a CE Europa, he was eligible to play for the Catalan national team, and he was a member of the team that won the last edition of the Prince of Asturias Cup, an inter-regional competition organized by the RFEF, starting in both legs of a two-legged title-decider against Asturias, with both ending in victories to the Catalan side.

== Honours ==
=== Club ===
CE Europa

Catalan football championship:

- Champions (1): 1922-23

Copa del Rey:

- Runner-up (1): 1923

=== International ===
Catalonia

Prince of Asturias Cup:

- Champions (1): 1926 Prince of Asturias Cup
