= José María Castell =

Spanish footballer

Personal information
- Full name: José María Castell García de la Cruz
- Date of birth: 24 September 1896
- Place of birth: San Sebastián, Gipuzkoa, Spain
- Date of death: 13 October 1981 (aged 85)
- Place of death: Madrid
- Position: Midfielder

Senior career*
| Years | Team | Apps | (Gls) |
| 1912–1919 | Madrid FC | | |

International career
| 1915–1918 | Madrid | +4 | (+1) |
Medal record
Madrid
Prince of Asturias Cup
| Gold medal – first place | 1918 Prince of Asturias Cup | Team |
- * Club domestic league appearances and goals

José María Castell García de la Cruz (24 September 1896 – 13 October 1981) was a Spanish footballer who played as a midfielder. Castell was one of the most important figures of Madrid FC at the beginning and middle of the 20th last century, as a player, captain, manager and even as an architect.

== Club career ==
Born in San Sebastián, he moved to Madrid when he was a child, and there he studied at the Colegio Clásico Español, where he took his first steps in football, playing as a midfielder. In 1910, when he was fourteen years old, he returned to his homeland and signed for the local club Esaso Athletic Club, where he stood out as a good player, and when he returned to the capital to continue his studies in 1911, he was incorporated into the third team of Madrid FC. The following year, Castell was promoted to the second team and when Arsenio Comamala left the club in 1912, he moved to the first team, forming a great midfield partnership with Alberto Machimbarrena and Rositzky, who were the phenomena of the time. He was a brave player on the attack, taking risks in the passes, as well as shooting from the center of the field with the intention of surprising the goalkeeper. Despite the presence of the likes of Machimbarrena, Carcer, Soto Aranguren and even Bernabéu, it was Castell, who at the age of only 18, became the captain of Madrid FC in 1914. No one disputed this decision in a time where the captain had the duty of dictating the tactics to be followed (since the coach as we know him today did not exist back then) and who had to make up the line-ups and game plans, basically serving as a captain-coach. A century after his appointment as captain, and the idea of appointing an eighteen-year-old boy as captain of Real Madrid has become ridiculous.

He was a member of the Madrid team that won the 1917 Copa del Rey, which also included the likes of René Petit, Santiago Bernabéu, Teus, Sansinenea and the Aranguren brothers (Soto and Eulogio). He also helped the club win four Centro Championships in 1912–13, 1915–16, 1916–17 and 1917–18.

In January 1919 against Racing de Madrid, he played as a left defender, because of a madridista who made his debut as a right midfielder: Juan Monjardín. The last time he appeared in a Madrid line-up was at the end of April 1919, in a match against Athletic Madrid, retiring at the age of 23, to devote himself to his profession as an architect, but his link with Madrid FC remained intact.

== Retirement ==
In addition to his skill on the pitch, he is also remembered for his construction skills of the pitch, since he was the architect of the Chamartín, which served as the Real Madrid stadium before the Santiago Bernabéu Stadium. Other outstanding works were the Metropolitano stadium and the expansion of the ACB building located in La Catellana. Once, during the construction of the old Chamartín, King Alfonso XIII showed up to see the building, and it was Castell himself, despite being quite nervous, who gave the respective explanations to the monarch. The king congratulated the architect for his work, thus initiating certain relations with the royal family.

Other facets that he carried out in the club were those of manager in the 1940s, where he accompanied the team on most of its trips around Europe; member of the Comité de Competición in the 1950s. He was also part of the Castilian Football Federation, being its treasurer, for which he was decorated with the medal of merit of the Federation. Furthermore, he was Real Madrid's number one socio until he died in the early eighties. He acquired such a distinction after the death of his friend, General Meléndez (the president of Madrid from 1908 to 1916 and from 1939 to 1940). When they went to congratulate Castell on his new card with his new number, he assured them that he could not be happy about his new position since it was the consequence of the death of a great friend (Santiago Bernabéu had the card number 12 at that time).

== International career ==
Like many other FC Madrid players of that time, he played several matches for the 'Centro' (Madrid area) representative team] during the 1910s, however, due to the little statistical rigor that the newspapers had at that time, the exact amount of caps he earned is unknown. He was part of the Madrid team that won two Prince of Asturias Cups in 1917 and 1918, an inter-regional competition organized by the RFEF. Castell participated in the 1916 and 1918 editions as a substitute, and the only reason he was a starter in 1917 edition was because the tournament coincided with the 1917 Copa del Rey Final between Madrid FC and Arenas, which prevented the Centro side from using the best Madrid FC players, which opened vacancies. Castell was thus, one of the few Madrid FC players who participated in the 1917 Prince of Asturias Cup, with the remaining members of the squad coming from Athletic Madrid and Racing de Madrid. Naturally, he was chosen as the captain of this team which the press gave little to no chances of winning the tournament, but under the leadership of Castell, who scored (penalty) in a 3–2 win over Cantabric, the Centro team managed to win the cup for the first time in the team's history despite having a weaker side than in the previous tournament.

== Honours ==
=== Club ===
Madrid FC

- Centro Championship
  - Winners (4): 1912–13, 1915–16, 1916–17 and 1917–18
- Copa del Rey:
  - Winners (1): 1917

=== International ===
Madrid

- Prince of Asturias Cup:
  - Champions (2): 1917 and 1918
  - Runner-up (1): 1916
