= Bernardo Menéndez =

Spanish footballer and referee

Personal information
- Full name: Bernardo Menéndez Galán
- Date of birth: 20 February 1889
- Place of birth: Avilés, Asturias, Spain
- Date of death: unknown
- Place of death: Spain
- Position: Defender

Senior career*
Years	Team	Apps	(Gls)
1907–1918	Real Madrid		
- * Club domestic league appearances and goals

Bernardo Menéndez Galán (20 February 1889 – unknown) was a Spanish footballer who played as a defender for Real Madrid in the mid-1910s. He later worked as a referee, being a co-founder of College of Referees of the Center, the first College of Referees in Spain.

== Playing career ==
Bernardo Menéndez was born in Avilés, Asturias, but it was in Madrid where he began his football career, joining the ranks of Real Madrid in 1907, and making his debut with the first team in a friendly match against Español de Madrid on 15 December 1907, which ended in a 2–2 draw. He had to wait nearly six years to make his official debut with the first team on 17 March 1913, in the semifinals of the 1913 Copa del Rey against Athletic Bilbao, which ended in a 3–0 loss.

Menéndez then made a further three official appearances for Madrid, all in the Madrid regional championship, although some sources state that he made a total of nine official appearances and won four regional titles along with two Copa del Reys. Outside football, he worked at Circulo Industrial.

== Refereeing career ==
Menéndez began his refereeing career when he was still an active player, which was normal at the time; for instance, on 12 May 1915, he refereed a match between the Basque Country and Catalonia in the 1915 Prince of Asturias Cup, which ended in a 1–0 victory for the Basques, and two years later, on 10 May 1917, he refereed another Catalonia match in the Prince of Asturias Cup, but this time ending in their favour: 1–0 win over Cantabric.

In 1914, Menéndez was among those who formed the College of Referees of the Central Regional Federation, which was the first College of Referees in Spain. Together with the likes of Manuel Prast, Alfonso Albéniz, and Julián Ruete, he was a member of the College's first constitution on 15 April 1914, but following the latter's resignation on 19 May, he was elected secretary. He then became one of the first category referees, and whose most important task was to referee the matches of the Madrid Championship, and if available, the Copa del Rey.

== Later life ==
In late 1923, Menéndez, then a director of Madrid, together with Pedro Parages, José María Peña, and Carlos López Quesada, helped secure the required loan of 500,000 pesetas to build the Estadio Chamartín, which was inaugurated in May 1924, with the capacity for a crowd of 25,000 people.

== Honours ==
Real Madrid

- Centro Championship:
  - Champions (3): 1915–16, 1916–17, 1917–18
