= Ramón Olalquiaga =

Spanish footballer (1898–1990)

Personal information
- Full name: Ramón Olalquiaga Borne
- Date of birth: 30 August 1898
- Place of birth: Gipuzkoa, Spain
- Date of death: 31 January 1990 (aged 91)
- Place of death: Madrid, Spain
- Position: Forward

Senior career*
Years	Team	Apps	(Gls)
1917–1923	Athletic Madrid		

International career
1918	Madrid	1	(2)

Managerial career
- 1924–1925: Athletic Madrid
Medal record
Madrid
Prince of Asturias Cup
Gold medal – first place	1918 Prince of Asturias Cup	Team
- * Club domestic league appearances and goals

Ramón Olalquiaga Borne (30 August 1898 – 31 January 1990), sometimes spelled as Ramón Olalkiaga, was a Spanish footballer who played as a forward for Athletic Madrid, and later a coach, engineer and professor of agronomy.

== Early life and education ==
Born on 30 August 1898 in Gipuzkoa to a local veterinarian, Olalquiaga studied Marianist studies in San Sebastián and later studied agronomic engineering in Madrid.

== Club career ==
As a student in Madrid, Olalquiaga joined the ranks of Atlético Madrid in 1917, aged 19, with whom he played for six years, until 1923. Together with Sansinenea, Miguel Mieg, Cosme Vázquez and Monchín Triana, he was part of the great Athletic side of the early 20s that won the 1920–21 Centro Championship, the club's first-ever piece of silverware, and then reached the 1921 Copa del Rey final, which ended in a 4–1 loss to Athletic Bilbao.

== International career ==
As an Atlético Madrid player, Olalquiaga was eligible to play for the 'Centro' (Madrid area) representative team, being a member of the team that won the Prince of Asturias Cup in 1918, an inter-regional competition organized by the RFEF. In the tournament, he only played the second leg of the decisive tie against Cantabric, and in his only appearance in the competition he managed to imprint his name in the competition's history by netting the two goals that sealed a 3–1 victory that sealed Madrid's second title in a row. With these two goals, he was the top scorer of the tournament alongside Senén Villaverde and teammate José María Sansinenea.

== Managerial career ==
As a coach, he managed Athletic Madrid for one season (1924–25), leading his side to victory in the 1924–25 central championship, hence qualifying to the 1925 Copa del Rey, where they were eliminated in the semifinals by Arenas Club.

== Later life and death ==
Olalquiaga dedicated the latter years of his life to teaching agronomy in Madrid, becoming the author of many scientific works, and even receiving an Order of Merit in the field of agriculture, fisheries, and food. In October 1955, he was promoted to Chief Engineer of the National Corps of Agricultural Engineers, replacing José Maria Ordóñez Manjarrés. In June 1961, he was released from his position in the board of directors of Productores de Semillas, S. A.

Olalquiaga died in Madrid on 31 January 1990, at the age of 91.

== Honours ==
Athletic Madrid

- Centro Championship: 1920–21
- Copa del Rey runner-up: 1921

Madrid XI

- Prince of Asturias Cup: 1918
