= Feliciano Rey =

Spanish footballer

Personal information
- Full name: Feliciano Rey Álvarez
- Date of birth: 4 July 1894
- Place of birth: Madrid, Spain
- Date of death: 4 March 1974 (aged 79)
- Position: Midfielder

Senior career*
Years	Team	Apps	(Gls)
1914–1917	Racing de Madrid		
1917–1918	Madrid FC		
1918–1920	Racing de Madrid		

International career
1915–1918	Madrid	+2	(+1)

Managerial career
- 1929–30: Deportivo Balompié
Medal record
Madrid
Prince of Asturias Cup
Gold medal – first place	1918 Prince of Asturias Cup	Team
- * Club domestic league appearances and goals

Feliciano Rey Álvarez (4 July 1894 – 4 March 1974), was a Spanish footballer who played as a midfielder for Racing de Madrid and Madrid FC. After retiring, he had a short spell at Deportivo Balompié as manager.

== Club career ==
Born in Madrid, he began his career at his hometown club Racing de Madrid in 1914, with whom he won the 1914–15 Centro Championship together with Joaquín Pascual, Ezequiel Montero, Antonio De Miguel, and Ricardo Álvarez, with the latter two also being his teammates at Madrid FC.

He stood out at Racing for his goalscoring ability, which eventually drew the attention of Madrid FC, who signed him in 1917, and despite helping the club win the Centro Championships in 1917–18, and reach the 1918 Copa del Rey Final, starting in a 0-2 loss to Real Unión, Rey returned to Racing at the end of the 1917–18 season, where he finished his career.

== International career ==
Being a Racing de Madrid player, he was eligible to play for the Madrid national team and he was a member of the Madrid side that participated in the first edition of the Prince of Asturias Cup in 1915, an inter-regional competition organized by the RFEF. Rey was also a member of the Madrid team that won the 1918 Prince of Asturias Cup, which consisted of a two-legged final against Cantabric, and he scored the winning goal of the first leg in a 3–2 win, thus contributing decisively in the capital side's triumph.

== Manegerial career ==
After retiring he became a manager, taking the helm of Deportivo Balompié in 1929, but his coaching career was short-lived as he left this position at the end of the 1929–30 season, and never again managed other side.

== Honours ==
=== Club ===
Racing de Madrid

- Centro Championship
  - Winners (2): 1914–15 and 1918–19

Madrid FC

- Centro Championship
  - Winners (2): 1917–18
- Copa del Rey
  - Runner-up (1): 1918

=== International ===
Madrid

- Prince of Asturias Cup:
  - Champions (1): 1918
