= Pere Monistrol =

Catalan footballer (1894–1972)

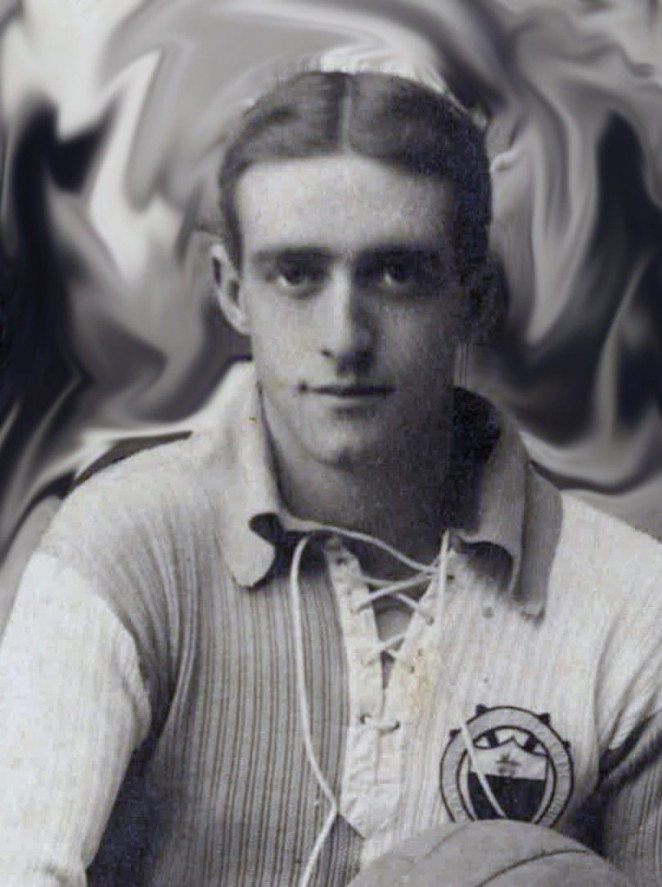

Personal information
- Full name: Pere Monistrol and Masafret
- Date of birth: August 16, 1894
- Place of birth: Sabadell, Catalonia, Spain
- Date of death: May 2, 1972 (aged 77)
- Place of death: Sabadell, Spain
- Position: Midfielder

Senior career*
Years	Team	Apps	(Gls)
1909–1919	Sabadell		

International career
1915–1919	Catalonia		
Medal record
Catalonia
1916 Prince of Asturias Cup
Silver medal – second place	1917 Prince of Asturias Cup	Team
- * Club domestic league appearances and goals

Pere Monistrol (August 16, 1894 – May 2, 1972) was a Catalan photographer and footballer of the 1910s. Born in Sabadell, Catalonia, he was a highly regarded professional photographer in Sabadell, who in 1948 achieved remarkable success at the International Exhibition of Pictorial Photography in Dublin. In addition, he was one of the first great players of the Sabadell FC, where he played between 1909 and 1919. He was a member of the team that was proclaimed champion of Catalonia in the 1919–20 season. He also played for the Catalan national team between 1915 and 1919.
