= Ricardo Álvarez (footballer, born 1897) =

Spanish footballer

Personal information
- Full name: Ricardo Álvarez Lobo
- Date of birth: 7 July 1897
- Place of birth: Madrid, Spain
- Date of death: 21 February 1955 (aged 57)
- Position: Left winger

Senior career*
Years	Team	Apps	(Gls)
1914–1916	Racing de Madrid		
1916–1918	Madrid FC	23	(9)
1918–1920	Racing de Madrid		
1920–1923	Espanyol		
1923–1929	Racing de Madrid		

International career
1915–1916	Madrid	+4	(+1)
1924	Madrid	+1	(0)
Medal record
Madrid
Prince of Asturias Cup
Silver medal – second place	1916 Prince of Asturias Cup	Team
Silver medal – second place	1923–24 Prince of Asturias Cup	Team
- * Club domestic league appearances and goals

Ricardo Álvarez Lobo (Madrid, 7 July 1897 - Madrid, 21 February 1955) was a Spanish footballer who usually played as a left winger. The highlight of his career was scoring the winning goal of the 1917 Copa del Rey Final for Madrid FC in extra-time.

== Club career ==
Born in Madrid, he began his career at his hometown club Racing de Madrid in 1914, aged 17, where he played as a midfielder. He played a pivotal role in helping the club win the 1914–15 Centro Championship, along with Joaquín Pascual, Ezequiel Montero, Antonio De Miguel, and Feliciano Rey, with the latter two also being his teammates at Madrid FC. After two great seasons at Racing, he was signed by Madrid FC. In the two seasons he spent at the club, he won two Centro Championships and reached two Copa del Rey finals in 1917 and 1918, starting in both of them and scoring the winning goal in the extra-time of the former against Arenas de Getxo in a 2–1 win.

Despite playing a key role in Madrid's back-to-back Copa del Rey finals, the club's board of directors decided that both Álvarez and Rey, were no longer needed, and so, they both returned to Racing at the end of the 1918–19 season, and in their first season back, they contributed decisively in helping Racing win the 1918–19 Centro Championship four points clear of Madrid. This was Álvarez's third Championship in a row. He then had a three-year stint with Espanyol, before returning to Racing once again where he retired in 1927.

== International career ==
Being a Racing de Madrid player, he was eligible to play for the Madrid national team, being a member of the Madrid side that participated in the first edition of the Prince of Asturias Cup in 1915, an inter-regional competition organized by the RFEF. Álvarez also participated in the following edition, which consisted of a two-legged tie against Catalonia, and he scored an equalizer in the first leg, although Madrid still lost 3–6.

He was part of the Madrid side that reached the final of the 1923–24 Prince of Asturias Cup, and although he did not play in the infamous final against Catalonia which ended in a 4–4 draw, Álvarez then started in the replay of the final on 26 February 1924, replacing Gonzalo in a 2–3 loss to their regional rivals.

== Honours ==
=== Club ===
Racing de Madrid

- Centro Championship
  - Winners (2): 1914–15 and 1918–19

Madrid FC

- Centro Championship
  - Winners (2): 1916–17, 1917–18
- Copa del Rey:
  - Winners (1): 1917
  - Runner-up (1): 1918

=== International ===
Madrid

- Prince of Asturias Cup:
  - Runner-up (1): 1916 and 1923–24
