= Cristóbal Martí =

Spanish footballer and manager

Martí
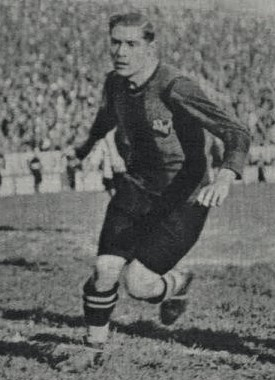

Personal information
- Full name: Cristóbal Martí Batalla
- Date of birth: 22 May 1903
- Place of birth: Granollers, Spain
- Date of death: 28 July 1986 (aged 83)
- Positions: Winger; full-back

Senior career*
Years	Team	Apps	(Gls)
1921–1923	Sabadell		
1923–1925	Barcelona		
1925–1928	Sabadell		
1928–1933	Barcelona	54	(2)
1933–1935	Espanyol	20	(2)

International career
1930–1931	Spain	3	(0)
1921–1933	Catalonia		

Managerial career
- 1939–1940: Racing de Santander
- 1940–1941: Real Oviedo
- 1943–1944: Mallorca
- * Club domestic league appearances and goals

Cristóbal Martí Batalla (born 22 May 1903 – 28 July 1986) was a Spanish football player and manager.

== Career ==
Born in Granollers, Catalonia, Martí began playing football with CE Sabadell FC before joining FC Barcelona. He made more than 250 official appearances for Barcelona, winning La Liga during the 1928–29 season. After the 1932–33 season, Martí joined RCD Espanyol where he played until the outbreak of the Spanish civil war.

== International career ==
Martí made three appearances for the Spain national football team during 1930 and 1931. He also played for the Catalonia national football team, and he was part of the team that won two Prince of Asturias Cups (an inter-regional competition) in the 1920s, winning the competition in 1923-24 and in 1926. Martí scored the only goal in the semi-final of the 1923-24 edition against Biscay before helping the Catalan team to beat a Castile/Madrid XI in the final.

== Managerial career ==
After he retired from playing, Martí became a football coach. He managed Racing de Santander, Real Oviedo and RCD Mallorca.

== Honours ==
=== Club ===
FC Barcelona

- Spanish Cup: 1925
- Catalan Champions: 1923–24, 1924–25, 1929–30, 1930–31, 1931–32

=== International ===
Catalan XI

- Prince of Asturias Cup: 1923-24 and 1926
