= Estebán Pelaó =

Spanish footballer and manager (1898–1980)

Personal information
- Full name: Estebán Pelaó Gratacós
- Date of birth: 10 January 1898
- Place of birth: Barcelona, Spain
- Date of death: 28 July 1980 (aged 82)
- Place of death: Barcelona, Spain
- Position: Midfielder

Senior career*
Years	Team	Apps	(Gls)
1916–1924	CE Europa		
1924–1925	Espanyol		
1925–1928	CE Europa		

International career
1920–1927	Catalonia	8	(0)

Managerial career
- 1939–1940: CE Europa
Medal record
Catalonia
Prince of Asturias Cup
Gold medal – first place	1926 Prince of Asturias Cup	Team
- * Club domestic league appearances and goals

Estebán Pelaó Gratacós (10 January 1898 – 28 July 1980) was a Spanish footballer who played as a midfielder who played for CE Europa, Espanyol, and the Catalonia national team.

== Early life ==
Estebán Pelaó was born in Barcelona on 10 January 1898 as the son of Pere Pelahó i Puigvert, and Maria Gratacós i Subirós, both born in Tortellà. He was the younger brother of Bonaventura Pelaó, who also played for CE Europe.

== Club career ==
Pelaó spent all of his career at CE Europa, except the 1924–25 season, in which he played for Espanyol. He played as a centre-half and was captain of CE Europa during its golden age in the 1920s, playing a pivotal role in turning the club into an important team in Catalonia, competing head-to-head against the likes of FC Barcelona and Espanyol, and together with Juan Pellicer, Manuel Cros and Antonio Alcázar, he helped the club win the 1922–23 Catalan Championship after beating Barça 1–0 in a play-off title-decider on 21 March 1923. Pelaó was the captain of the club that day, and he then lead CE Europa to their first-ever Copa del Rey final in 1923, which they lost 0–1 to Athletic Bilbao, courtesy of a goal from Travieso.

As the team's captain, Pelaó was punished by the RFEF because one of his players (José Julià) refused to leave the rural area after being sent off in a match against FC Barcelona on 10 February 1924. Pelaó retired in 1928, after a 12-year career. In total, he scored 15 goals in 134 matches with the club, all of which in the Catalan championship.

== International career ==
As a CE Europa player, Pelaó was eligible to play for the Catalonia national team, making his debut on 17 May 1917, in a friendly against FC Barcelona, which ended in a 2–1 loss. In the early 1920, he played two friendlies against Biscay, helping his side to two victories; the following day, the journalists of the Spanish newspaper Mundo Deportivo stated that neither he nor Francesco Sanahuja were "in a position to represent the region in matches of this magnitude, although they nonetheless honored their excellent will and abilities".

Together with Paulino Alcántara, Sagibarba and Josep Samitier, he was a member of the Catalan squad that participated in the last edition of the Prince of Asturias Cup, an inter-regional competition organized by the RFEF. He started both matches in the midfield as Catalonia beat Asturias in a two-legged title-decider to win the title.

== Managerial career ==
As a coach, Pelaó managed CE Europa in the 1939–40 season.

== Death ==
Pelaó died in Barcelona on 28 July 1980, at the age of 82. Following his death, his relatives: children Esteve and Margarida; son-in-law Pero Haro; grandchildren Maria Angela, Maria Isabel, Francisco Xavier and Carles; sister Margaret; nephews, cousins, and the whole family want to know their health and acquaintances. The religious ceremony took place two days later at 1:00 pm, in the chapels of Calle Sancho d'Avila no. 2 before being then transferred to the Southwest cemetery.

== Honours ==
=== Club ===
CE Europa

- Catalan championship:
  - Champions (1): 1922–23
- Copa del Rey:
  - Runner-up (1): 1923

=== International ===
Catalonia XI

- Prince of Asturias Cup:
  - Champions (1): 1926
