= Saturno Villaverde =

Spanish footballer

Personal information
- Full name: Saturno Villaverde Lavandera
- Date of birth: 29 February 1892
- Place of birth: Gijón, Asturias, Spain
- Date of death: Unknown
- Position: Forward

Senior career*
Years	Team	Apps	(Gls)
1914–1918	Athletic Club de Madrid		

International career
1917	Madrid	3	(3)
Medal record
Madrid
Prince of Asturias Cup
Gold medal – first place	1917 Prince of Asturias Cup	Team
- * Club domestic league appearances and goals

Saturno Villaverde Lavandera (29 February 1892 - Unknown), nicknamed Saturnino and also known as Villaverde II, was a Spanish footballer who played as a forward for Athletic Club de Madrid. His brothers, Fernando and Senén, were also footballers and also played for Athletic Madrid.

== Biography ==
He joined Athletic in 1914, featuring alongside the likes of Pagaza, Juan de Cárcer and his brothers, Fernando and Senén, who joined in 1915, but while they left in 1916 and 1917 respectively, he stayed with the club, and in 1917, he was summoned to play for the Madrid national team in the 1917 Prince of Asturias Cup, an inter-regional competition organized by the RFEF. Saturno was the star of the tournament, being the top scorer with 3 goals – a brace against Catalonia in a 2–2 draw and the winner against Cantabric in a 3–2 win – thus going from an utter unknown of the masses to the tournament's surprise package and a loved hero in Madrid. Remarkably, in the game against Cantabric, the Villaverde brothers were rivals, as Fernando and Senén were representing the Cantabrians. However, his excellent campaign at the tournament almost did not happen, since initially, Saturno was not even in the radar of the dirigents to be called up for the Madrid team, but because the tournament coincided with the 1917 Copa del Rey Final between Madrid FC and Arenas, which prevented them from having the best players of Madrid FC, meaning they had to call the "second options" (players from Athletic Madrid and Racing de Madrid) to put together a team which could compete, and despite being a weaker side than in the previous tournament, they managed to win what the "first options" had failed to.

== Honours ==
=== International ===
Madrid

- Prince of Asturias Cup:
  - Champions (1): 1917
