= Campo de O'Donnell (Atlético Madrid) =

Former stadium in Madrid, Spain

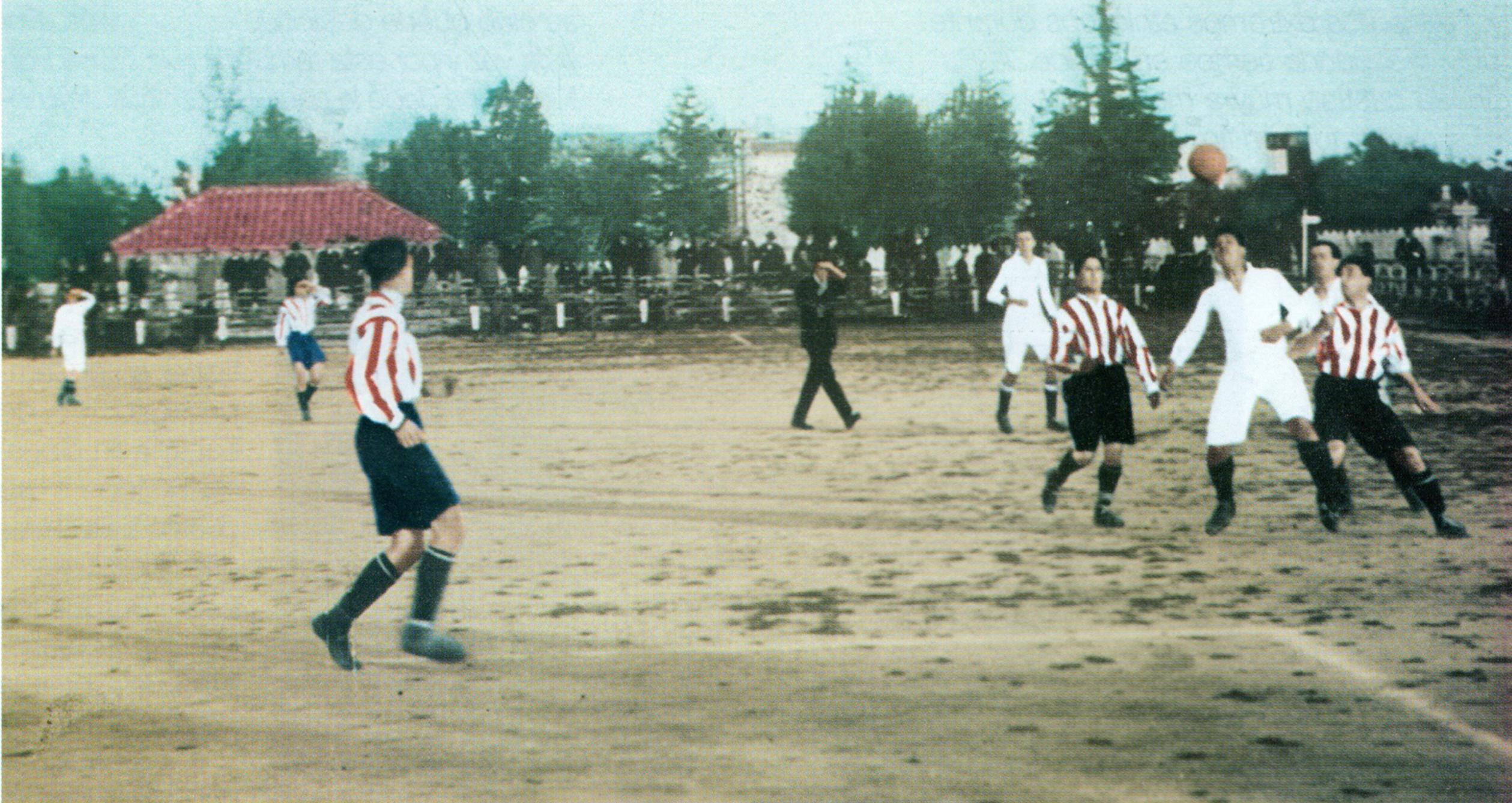
- Derbi madrileño in 1919
- Interactive map of Campo de O'Donnell
- Location: Madrid, Spain
- Capacity: 10 000
- Field size: 100,38 x 64

Construction
- Opened: 9 February 1913
- Closed: 1923
- Demolished: 1923

Tenant
- Atlético Madrid (1913–1923)

Campo de O'Donnell was Atlético Madrid's main stadium between 1913 and 1923. It should not be confused with Atlético's fierce rivals Real Madrid's Campo de O'Donnell, which had the same name and was situated 200 meters away on the same boulevard called Calle de O'Donnell. On the other hand, the Atletico stadium was located in the block formed by the streets of O'Donnell, Narváez (then undeveloped) and Menorca. Atlético Madrid moved from Tiro del Pichón in 1913. Their inaugural match at the stadium was held on 9 February 1913 against Athletic Bilbao, who won 4–0.

== History ==
Atlético Madrid had been occupying a piece of land in the Tiro del Pichón, near the park, since 1902, but due to the rise of football in Spain during the first decades of the 20th century, the club looked for a new location to develop its activities, and so, at the end of 1912, the construction of a new stadium began. The project was carried out thanks to the financial contribution of Manuel Rodríguez Arzuaga, patron of the club, who put up 30,000 pesetas (which at the time represented a fortune) to prepare the land and pay for the 600 linear meters of wood used in the fenced. The O'Donnell Field was a pioneer as it was the first to install fences, which allowed the start of ticket sales to generate income, which their previous stadium, Tiro del Pichón, did not have. The installation of the fence was carried out by the members and players of the club.

The new stadium was inaugurated on 9 February 1913 with a match against Athletic Club, finishing in a victory for the Biscayan team by 0-4 with goals from Luis Cortadi, José María Belauste and Pichichi (brace). It so happens that Real Madrid, Atlético's eternal rival, inaugurated the Campo de O'Donnell a month earlier, located just 200 meters further north on the same street.

This stadium became the largest in the capital of Spain with a capacity for 10,000 spectators. In 1915, it hosted the final of the first Prince of Asturias Football Cup. Furthermore, it was the first stadium in Madrid to host an international match (and the second in Spain after San Mamés), when on 18 December 1921, Spain faced and defeated Portugal 3-1, a historic result not only to Spain, but to Portugal themselves as they were playing their first-ever international game that day.

On 8 April 1923, the Campo de O'Donnell hosted its last match, a friendly with Czechoslovak FK Viktoria Žižkov, which ended in a 2-2 draw. The goals were the work of Monchín Triana and Joaquín Ortiz on the red and white side and Mares and Galenek scored for the visiting team, the latter being the author of the last goal in the history of the field.

Later, due to the large increase in the number of fans, the then-president Julián Ruete decided to move the team to the Estadio Metropolitano de Madrid, a more modern field and the first with a grass pitch in the club's history.

== International matches ==
Team #1	Score	Team #2	Date	Attendance
Spain	3–1	Portugal	18 December 1921	14,000
