= Camp del Guinardó =

Football stadium in Barcelona (1923–1964)

- Interactive map of Camp del Guinardó
- Location: Catalonia, Spain
- Capacity: 2.000

Construction
- Opened: 8 December 1923
- Demolished: 1964

Tenant
- CE Europa (1923–1931)

The Camp del Guinardó was a football stadium in the city of Barcelona, Spain, located in the neighborhood of El Guinardó. It served as the home ground of the club CE Europa between 1923 and 1931. It had a capacity for approximately 19,000 spectators, 2,000 of them seated. In 1960 the stadium was renamed Mostajo Velodrome and ended up hosting regional football as cyclists circled the outer perimeter, thus serving for the practice of both sports at the same time until its definitive closure in 1964.

== History ==
CE Europa had several short-lived football fields in the 1910s, but because of the growth of the club, they began to look for more durable land that could be better suited to their growing needs, and thus, at the beginning of the 1920s, the construction of a new stadium began in an area that they bought (712,000 square spans), between Lepanto and Sardeña streets, on Travessera de Gràcia, near the previous field of the street, the Camp de la Indústria and the current Nou Sardenya. It had capacity for approximately 19,000 spectators, including 2,000 of them seated and it also became known as the Camp dels Cuartells because of its location next to the Lepant barracks. It was inaugurated on 8 December 1923, with a friendly match between CE Europa and the Hungarian Szombathelyi Haladás, which ended in a 1–1 draw.

In 1929, CE Europa was one of the ten founding members of La Liga, and during three seasons, the Camp del Guinardó hosted the CE Europa matches in Spain's top flight.

In 1931, CE Europa merged with Gràcia FC and briefly became known as Catalunya FC, but the merger was not a success, so when their union came to an end in the 1932–33 season, Gràcia FC, now renamed UD Gracia, once again used the Campo del Guinardó, while CE Europa, who was now in a severe crisis, moved to the modest Camp dels Quinze, along the Avinguda dels Quinze in Vilapicina, far away from Gràcia. By the end of the Spanish Civil War in 1939, this venue was already in a bad state, but it was still rented by Gràcia anyway.

On 27 May 1942, a cycling track was inaugurated around the playing field, and the venue became known as the Gracia Velodrome. In 1957, the cyclist Santiago Mostajo Gutiérrez, who had been two-time Spanish champion in 1952 at the Gracia Velodrome, acquired the land and then renovated the track and the venue, which was renamed Mostajo Velodrome and then officially inaugurated on 8 May 1960. He then collaborated with his father on the management of the Mostajo velodrome at the Camp del Guinardó in Barcelona, where a cycling school was set up. In 1963, the venue, in the form of a velodrome, served for the practice of both sports at the same time since it hosted regional football as cyclists circled the outer perimeter.

In 1964 it ceased its activity and was demolished as a result of the urban growth of the city to build houses.

== Bibliography ==
- Club Esportiu Europa; Soler, Ramon Vergés i (2009). Història d'un històric: CE Europa, 1907-2007 (in Catalan). Ajuntament de Barcelona, Gràcia. ISBN 978-84-9850-163-6.
