= Senén Villaverde =

Spanish footballer

Personal information
- Full name: Senén Villaverde Lavandera
- Date of birth: 1896
- Place of birth: Gijón, Asturias, Spain
- Date of death: 7 April 1950 (aged 53–54)
- Position: Forward

Senior career*
Years	Team	Apps	(Gls)
- Sporting de Gijón
1915–1916	Athletic Club de Madrid		
1916–1920	Sporting de Gijón		

International career
1917–1918	Cantabric	4	(2)
Medal record
Cantabria
Prince of Asturias Cup
Silver medal – second place	1918 Prince of Asturias Cup	Team
- * Club domestic league appearances and goals

Senén Villaverde Lavandera (1896 – 7 April 1950), also known as Villaverde III, was a Spanish footballer who played as a forward. His brothers, Saturnino and Fernando, were also footballers and also played for Athletic Club de Madrid.

== Club career ==
Born in Gijón, he began his career at his hometown club Sporting de Gijón. In 1915, he followed his older brother Fernando to Athletic Club de Madrid, but after just one season he returned to Sporting.

== International career ==
In 1917, he was summoned to play for the Cantabric representative team, a side consisting of players from the provinces of Asturias and Cantabria who played in the local league. He and his brother Fernando were members of the team that participated in the 1917 and 1918 editions of the Prince of Asturias Cup, an inter-regional competition organized by the RFEF. The 1918 tournament basically consisted of a two-legged tie against Centro team, a Castile/Madrid XI, and he scored in both games which both ended in losses. With these two goals, he was joint-top scorer of the tournament alongside José María Sansinenea and Ramón Olalquiaga.

== Honours ==
=== International ===
Cantabric

- Prince of Asturias Cup:
  - Runner-up (1): 1918
