= Fernando Villaverde =

Spanish footballer

Personal information
- Full name: Fernando Villaverde Lavandera
- Date of birth: 30 March 1894
- Place of birth: Gijón, Asturias, Spain
- Date of death: 23 June 1937 (aged 43)
- Position: Forward

Youth career
- 1909–1910: La Sportiva
- 1910–1911: Sporting de Gijón

Senior career*
Years	Team	Apps	(Gls)
1911–1915	Sporting de Gijón		
1915–1917	Athletic Club de Madrid		
1917–1920	Sporting de Gijón		

International career
1917–1918	Cantabric	4	(1)
Medal record
Cantabria
Prince of Asturias Cup
Silver medal – second place	1918 Prince of Asturias Cup	Team
- * Club domestic league appearances and goals

Fernando Villaverde Lavandera (30 March 1894 – 23 June 1937), also known as Villaverde I, was a Spanish footballer who played as a forward. His brothers, Saturnino and Senén, were also footballers and also played for Athletic Club de Madrid.

== Club career ==
Born in Gijón, he began his career in the youth ranks of his hometown club La Sportiva, a leading Gijón team in the early 20th century. At La Sportiva, he stood out for his goalscoring ability, which eventually drew the attention of Sporting de Gijón, who signed him in 1910. In his first year at the youth ranks of Sporting, he excelled, receiving the distinction of best child player in 1911. He was thus, promoted to the first team in 1911, and eventually, he was named the team captain. In 1915, he signed for Athletic Club de Madrid, but after two seasons he returned to Sporting.

In the first-ever Asturian derby between Sporting de Gijón and Real Oviedo (named Real Club Deportivo Oviedo at the time) held on 25 January 1920, it was Fernando who scored the opening goals, thus netting the first goal of one of Spain's biggest rivalries. Despite his great goalscoring form, a broken tibia and fibula would end his sports career in 1920, when he was only 26 years old. In the same year, a match between two Asturian teams was held in Gijón in his honor, in which he acted as referee. He also served as a referee in the first-ever game of the Asturias national team on 4 June 1922, which ended in a 3–7 loss to St Mirren F.C.

== International career ==
In 1917, he was summoned to play for the Cantabric national team, a side consisting of players from the provinces of Asturias and Cantabria. He and his brother Senén, were a member of the team that participated in the 1917 and 1918 editions of the Prince of Asturias Cup, an inter-regional competition organized by the RFEF. In the 1918 tournament, he scored one goal against the Centro team, a Castile/Madrid XI, in a 2–3 loss.

== Honours ==
=== International ===
Cantabric

- Prince of Asturias Cup:
  - Runner-up (1): 1918
