= José María Sansinenea =

Spanish footballer

Personal information
- Full name: José María Ygnacio Sansinenea Goñi
- Date of birth: 1 August 1896
- Place of birth: San Sebastián, Gipuzkoa, Spain
- Date of death: 11 August 1924 (aged 28)
- Position: Forward

Senior career*
Years	Team	Apps	(Gls)
1916–1920	Madrid FC		
1920–1921	Athletic Club de Madrid		
1921–1923	Real Sociedad		

International career
1918	Madrid	+2	(+2)
Medal record
Madrid
Prince of Asturias Cup
Gold medal – first place	1918 Prince of Asturias Cup	Team
- * Club domestic league appearances and goals

José María Ygnacio Sansinenea Goñi (1 August 1896 - 11 August 1924), simply known as Sansinenea, was a Spanish footballer who played as a forward.

== Club career ==
Born in San Sebastián, Sansinenea found his way into the home of a very prominent club in the capital, Madrid FC, with whom he played for 5 seasons (1916–1921). At the club he formed a great attacking partnership with Sotero Aranguren and René Petit, and the highlight of his career came in the 1917 Copa del Rey, being one of the most outstanding players in the tournament with a total of four goals, including the winner in the semi-finals against España FC, although he failed to score in the final against Arenas de Getxo as Madrid won 2–1. He also helped the club win three Centro Championships in 1916–17, 1917–18 and 1919–20.

He remained loyal to the club until 1920, when the club's board of directors decided that his recent low form did not allow him to continue defending Madrid's colors, and so, he ended up in the neighboring club, Athletic Madrid, for whom he played for just one season, but his impact at the club was nonetheless pivotal, as he played an important role in the club's first-ever piece of silverware, the 1920–21 Centro Championship. Unfortunately, he did not participate in the subsequent 1921 Copa del Rey campaign, which ended in a 1–4 loss to Athletic Bilbao in the final. At the end of the 1920–21 season, he left for Real Sociedad, where he ended his career in the mid-1920s.

== International career ==
Like many other Madrid FC players of that time, he played several matches for the 'Centro' (Madrid area) representative team during the 1910s, being part of the Madrid side that won the 1918 Prince of Asturias Cup, an inter-regional competition organized by the RFEF. Sansinenea missed the previous edition in 1917 because the tournament coincided with the 1917 Copa del Rey Final between Madrid FC and Arenas, which prevented the Madrid national side from using the Madrid FC players, so Sansinenea showed all his class in the 1918 edition, which basically consisted of a two-legged final against Cantabric, and he scored a goal in both games (3–2 and 3–1 victories), thus contributing decisively in the capital side's triumph. With these two goals, he was the joint-top scorer of the tournament alongside Senén Villaverde and teammate Ramón Olalquiaga.

== Honours ==
=== Club ===
Madrid FC

- Centro Championship
  - Winners (3): 1916–17, 1917–18 and 1919–20
- Copa del Rey:
  - Winners (1): 1917

Athletic Madrid

- Centro Championship:
  - Champions (1): 1920–21

=== International ===
Madrid

- Prince of Asturias Cup:
  - Champions (1): 1918
