= Eulogio Aranguren =

Argentine footballer

Personal information
- Full name: Eulogio Aranguren Labairu
- Date of birth: 27 July 1892
- Place of birth: Buenos Aires, Argentina
- Date of death: 19 October 1972 (aged 80)
- Position: Midfielder

Eulogio Aranguren Labairu (27 July 1892 – 19 October 1972) was an Argentine footballer who spent his youth in Basque Country. He was a midfielder and played most of his career for Real Madrid CF. He was the elder brother of Sotero Aranguren who was also his teammate at Real Madrid.

== Biography ==
He played for Real Madrid for 10 years, between 1911 and 1921. In this period he made 20 appearances but failed to score in official games, as he played mostly as defender.

Three years after the premature death of his brother, Eulogio (together with King Alfonso XIII and a sister of Machimbarrena, the captain of Real Madrid who also died in the same period) inaugurated a statue to the two players at the entrance of the first team's locker room. This statue is seen as a talisman for club's next generations of footballers.

In 1925 he founded the Real Madrid rugby team, he was also a referee and after that became president of the Castile Referee Federation.

He also was vice-president of the Spanish Football Federation, and on several occasions joined the Spain national football team as an official. He studied to become a lawyer. He had 5 children, Jose Eulogio (Josechu), Maruchi, Fernando, Sotero (died in infancy) and Ignacio.

Together with his brother, the Arangurens were the inaugural Argentine born footballers to play for Real Madrid.

== Honours ==
Real Madrid CF

- Copa del Rey: 1917
- Campeonato Regional Centro: 1912–13, 1915–16, 1916–17
