= 1917 Copa del Rey final =

- Event: 1917 Copa del Rey
Madrid FC	Arenas de Getxo
2	1
- After replay match

Final
Madrid FC	Arenas de Getxo
0	0
- After extra-time
- Date: 13 May 1917
- Venue: Camp de la Indústria, Barcelona
- Referee: (Spain) Paco Bru
- Attendance: 6,000

Replay
Arenas de Getxo	Madrid FC
1	2
- After extra-time
- Date: 15 May 1917
- Venue: Camp de la Indústria, Barcelona
- Referee: (Spain) Paco Bru
- Attendance: 2,500

The 1917 Copa del Rey final was the 17th final of the Spanish cup competition, the Copa del Rey. The final was played at Camp de la Indústria in Barcelona on 13 May 1917. The match ended without goals after twenty minutes of extra-time. The replay match was played two days later, in the same venue with the same referee. The match ended 1–1, and the teams decided to play twenty minutes of extra time. Neither team scored a goal in that time, so they decided to play another twenty minutes of extra time. Three minutes in the second period of extra time, Ricardo Álvarez scored for Madrid FC, thus sealing the fifth title for Madrid.

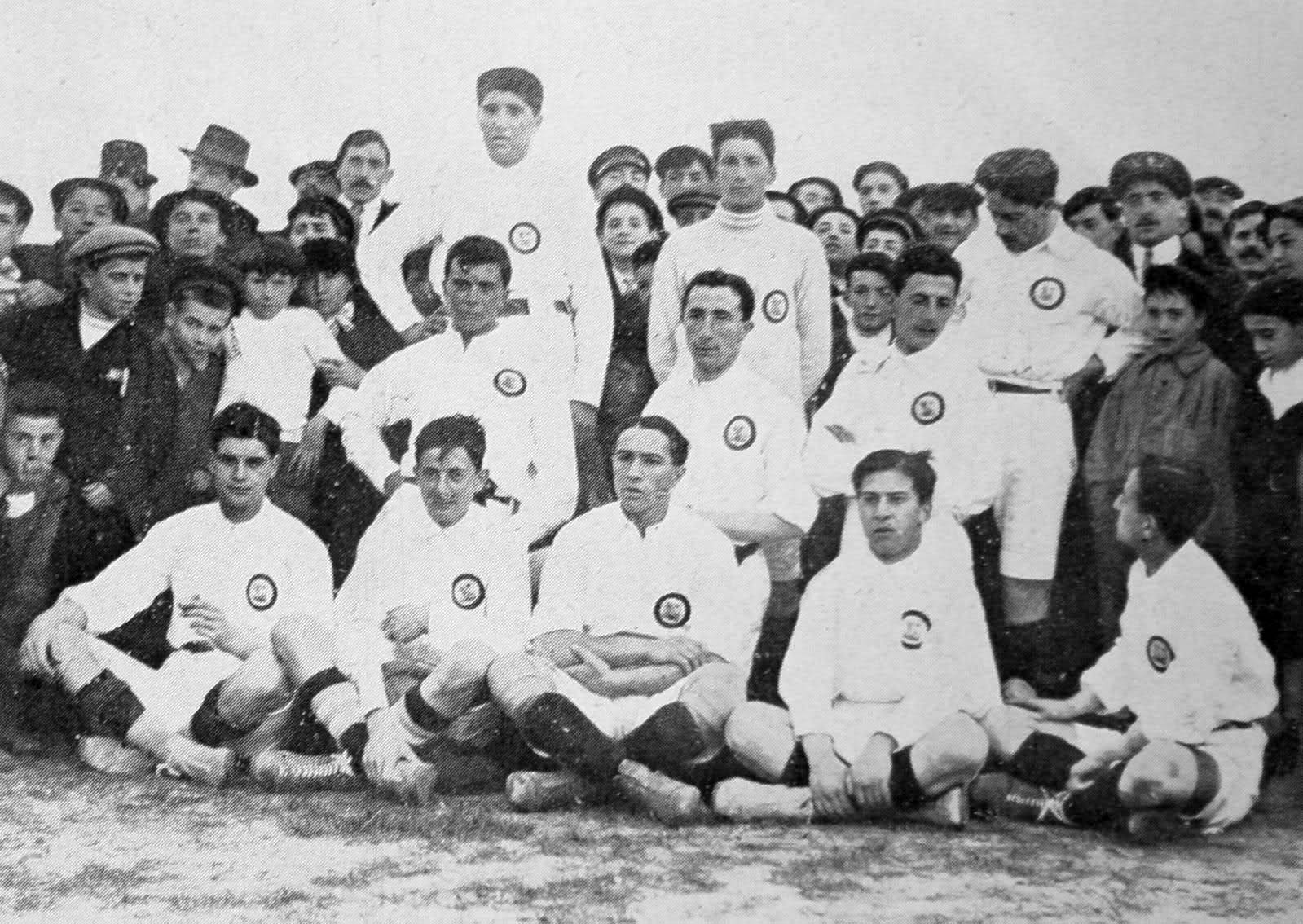
Team of Madrid FC, champion

== Match details ==
=== Final ===
13 May 1917
16:00 CET

Madrid FC	0–0 (a.e.t.)	Arenas de Getxo
	Report1; Report2

Camp de la Indústria, Barcelona
Attendance: 6,000
Referee: (Spain) Paco Bru

Madrid FC	Arenas

GK	1	(Spain) (Philippines) Eduardo Teus
DF	2	(Spain) José Antonio Erice
DF	3	(Spain) José Múgica
MF	4	(Spain) Ricardo Álvarez
MF	5	(Spain) Alberto Machimbarrena (c)
MF	6	(Spain) Eulogio Aranguren
FW	7	(Spain) Antonio De Miguel
FW	8	(Spain) José María Sansinenea
FW	9	(France) René Petit
FW	10	(Spain) Luis Saura
FW	11	(Spain) Sotero Aranguren
Manager:
(Ireland) Arthur Johnson

GK	1	(Spain) José María Jáuregui
DF	2	(Spain) Pedro Vallana
DF	3	(Spain) Guillermo Hormaechea
MF	4	(Spain) Gumersindo Uriarte
MF	5	(Spain) Pedro Barturen
MF	6	(Spain) José María Peña
FW	7	(Spain) Alejo Zubiaga
FW	8	(Spain) Chacho González
FW	9	(Spain) Julián Muñoz
FW	10	(Spain) Manolo Suárez
FW	11	(Spain) Florencio Peña

=== Replay ===
15 May 1917
16:00 CET

Madrid FC	2–1 (a.e.t.)	Arenas
René Petit 75'; Ricardo Álvarez 113'	Report1; Report2	Manolo Suárez 15'

Camp de la Indústria, Barcelona
Attendance: 2,500
Referee: (Spain) Paco Bru

Madrid FC	Arenas

GK	1	(Spain) (Philippines) Eduardo Teus
DF	2	(Spain) José Antonio Erice
DF	3	(Spain) José Múgica
MF	4	(Spain) Ricardo Álvarez
MF	5	(Spain) Alberto Machimbarrena (c)
MF	6	(Spain) Eulogio Aranguren
FW	7	(Spain) Antonio De Miguel
FW	8	(Spain) José María Sansinenea
FW	9	(France) René Petit
FW	10	(Spain) Fernando Muguiro
FW	11	(Spain) Sotero Aranguren
Manager:
(Ireland) Arthur Johnson

GK	1	(Spain) José María Jáuregui
DF	2	(Spain) Pedro Vallana
DF	3	(Spain) Guillermo Hormaechea
MF	4	(Spain) Gumersindo Uriarte
MF	5	(Spain) Pedro Barturen
MF	6	(Spain) José María Peña
FW	7	(Spain) Domingo Careaga
FW	8	(Spain) Chacho González
FW	9	(Spain) Julián Muñoz
FW	10	(Spain) Manolo Suárez
FW	11	(Spain) Florencio Peña

Copa del Rey
1917 winners
Madrid CF
5th title
