= Juan de Cárcer =

Spanish football player and manager

Personal information
- Full name: Juan de Cárcer y Disdier
- Date of birth: 1892
- Place of birth: Málaga, Spain
- Date of death: 1962 (aged 69–70)
- Place of death: Madrid, Spain
- Position: Goalkeeper

Senior career*
Years	Team	Apps	(Gls)
1910–1912	Club Español de Madrid		
1912–1916	Madrid FC		
1916–1919	Athletic Madrid		

International career
1915–1918	Madrid		

Managerial career
- 1920–1926: Real Madrid
Medal record
Madrid
Prince of Asturias Cup
Gold medal – first place	1918 Prince of Asturias Cup	Team
- * Club domestic league appearances and goals

Juan de Cárcer y Disdier (1892 in Málaga – October 1962 in Madrid) was a Spanish footballer who played as a goalkeeper and was also a referee, and manager. As a player, he represented both Madrid FC (Now Real Madrid) and Athletic Madrid (Now Atlético Madrid), and as a manager, he coached Real Madrid for six years from 1920 to 1926, but failed to win any trophies.

== Club career ==
Born in Málaga, he moved to Madrid as a child where he began to play football in 1907. He joined the ranks of Club Español de Madrid in 1910, with whom he played sporadically for two seasons, featuring alongside the likes of José María Castell and Gómar. In 1912 he signed for Real Madrid, appearing as a goalkeeper for the reserve team, until his good performances led him to debut with the first team at the beginning of 1913. He alternated the position with Pablo Lemmel, then the team's goalkeeper. He helped the club to win two regional championships in 1912–13 and 1915–16. He remained there until 1916, when the club's board of directors decided that his low form did not allow him to continue defending Madrid's goal and so, he ended up in the neighboring club, Atlético Madrid.

== International career ==
Like many other Madrid players of that time, he was summoned to play for the 'Centro' (Madrid area) representative team, and in May 1916, he was a member of the team that participated in the second edition of the Prince of Asturias Cup in 1916, an inter-regional competition organized by the RFEF. In the opening game against Catalonia he conceded 6 goals as Madrid lost 3–6 to their rivals, an event that not only prompted his dismissal from Real Madrid in that same year, it also cost him his place to the team's backup goalkeeper, Joaquín Pascual, who started in the second leg against Catalonia in a 2–2 draw. He was not a member of the Madrid team that won the 1917 Prince of Asturias Cup, but he started in both games of the 1918 edition, both ending in victories as Madrid won their second title in a row.

== Managerial career ==
As a coach, he managed Real Madrid for six years from 1920 to 1926, but failed to win any trophies.

== Honours ==
=== Club ===
Real Madrid

- Campeonato Regional Centro:
  - Champions (2): 1912–13, 1915–16

=== International ===
Madrid

- Prince of Asturias Cup:
  - Champions (1): 1918
  - Runner-up (1): 1916
