= Alberto Machimbarrena =

Spanish footballer

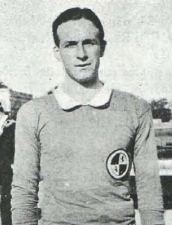
- Machimbarrena in 1915 with the Regional Selection of Castilla-Madrid

Personal information
- Full name: Alberto Machimbarrena Aguirrebengoa
- Date of birth: 31 March 1888
- Place of birth: San Sebastián, Spain
- Date of death: 19 July 1923 (aged 35)
- Place of death: Madrid, Spain
- Position: Midfielder

Alberto Machimbarrena Aguirrebengoa (31 March 1888 – 19 July 1923) was a Spanish footballer who played as a midfielder.

== Biography ==
During his career he alternated between two clubs: hometown team Real Sociedad and Real Madrid, known at the time as Madrid FC. While he played for Real Madrid, he was also studying architecture in the Spanish capital.

He became the leader of Real Madrid, captaining the team which won the Copa del Rey in 1917. He played for Real Madrid in eight official matches, all of them in the Copa del Rey, without scoring. For Real Sociedad he played 30 official matches between 1910 and 1922.

After retirement, in 1922, he returned to play some matches for Real Sociedad, which was in need of footballers.

He died prematurely in 1923 in Guadarrama (Madrid), because of tuberculosis.

In 1925, a statue of Machimbarrena and Sotero Aranguren (a Real Madrid teammate, who also died prematurely) was erected at the entrance of the team's dressing room at the Santiago Bernabéu Stadium.

== Honours ==
Real Madrid

- Copa del Rey: 1917
- Campeonato Regional Centro: 1915–16, 1916–17
