= Joaquín Pascual =

Spanish footballer

Personal information
- Full name: Joaquín Pascual Jiménez
- Date of birth: 8 November 1896
- Place of birth: Madrid, Spain
- Date of death: 25 October 1981 (aged 84)
- Place of death: Madrid, Spain
- Position: Goalkeeper

Senior career*
| Years | Team | Apps | (Gls) |
| 1914–1921 | Racing de Madrid | | |
| 1922–1924 | FC Barcelona | | |
| 1924–1925 | CD Tenerife | | |

International career
| 1914–1917 | Madrid | | |
Medal record
Madrid
Prince of Asturias Cup
| Gold medal – first place | 1917 Prince of Asturias Cup | Team |
- * Club domestic league appearances and goals

Joaquín Pascual Jiménez (8 November 1896 in Madrid – 25 October 1981 in Madrid), was a Spanish footballer who played as a goalkeeper.

== Club career ==
Born in Madrid, he began to play football at his hometown club Racing de Madrid in 1914, with whom he played for eight seasons. In 1922 he signed for FC Barcelona to replace Ricardo Zamora, who had returned to Espanyol. He played two seasons at the club, where he played 72 matches and won the Catalan Championship in 1924.

== International career ==
Being a Racing de Madrid player, he was eligible to play for the 'Centro' (Madrid area) representative team], and in May 1916, he was a member of the team that participated in the second edition of the Prince of Asturias Cup in 1916, an inter-regional competition organized by the RFEF. Initially, he served only as the backup goalkeeper for Juan de Cárcer, but after he conceded 6 goals in the first leg as Madrid lost 3-6 to rivals Catalonia, he got the chance to start the second leg in which he kept a clean-sheet as far as the 70th minute, but then Kinké scored a quick late brace to salvage a 2-2 draw to the Catalans. He was then a member of the Madrid team that won the 1917 Prince of Asturias Cup, in which he started in all three games, including the decisive one against Catalonia where he kept a clean-sheet in a 2-0 win. For the 1918 edition he was again a backup for Juan de Cárcer as Madrid won their second title in a row.

== Honours ==
=== Club ===
Barcelona

Catalan Championship:

- Champions (1): 1923-24

=== International ===
Madrid

Prince of Asturias Cup:

- Champions (1): 1917
