= 1924 Prince of Asturias Cup final =

- Event: 1923-24 Prince of Asturias Cup
Catalonia	Centro
7	6

Final
Catalonia	Centro
4	4
- After extra time
- Date: 24 February 1924
- Venue: San Mamés, Bilbao
- Referee: (Basque Country (autonomous community)) Murguia

Replay
Catalonia	Centro
3	2
- Date: 26 February 1924
- Venue: San Mamés, Bilbao
- Referee: (Cantabria) Fermín Sánchez

The 1924 Prince of Asturias Cup Final was the final match of the 1923–24 Prince of Asturias Cup, the sixth edition in the competition's history. The game was held at the San Mamés in Bilbao, Spain, on 24 February 1924, and ended in a 4–4 draw, after extra-time. The replay was played two days later and saw Catalonia beat the Centro team, a Castile/Madrid XI, by the score of 3–2.

The 1924 final is often listed as the greatest match in the history of the Prince of Asturias Cup, an inter-regional football competition contested by the regional selections of Spain. Thanks to its back-and-forth drama, last-minute heroics and a frenetic replay for a total of 13 goals in just 2 games, this final is regarded as one of the best football matches of the early stages of Spanish football. Some historians ascribe the match a lasting impact on both Madrid and Catalonia football history, contributing to the birth of the well-known football rivalry between the two regions.

The win earned Catalonia its second of three Prince of Asturias Cup titles, having won it in 1916, while the third title came two years later in 1926. Catalonia was the second region to win the Cup twice, following the Centro team (1917 and 1918), although, different from them, Catalonia won their titles as a guest (or neutral) rather than the host.

== Background ==
The Centro team was appearing in their second Prince of Asturias Cup final, with their previous appearance in the final in 1917 (a tie-breaker/play-off) having resulted in a 2–0 victory over Catalonia. On the other hand, Catalonia was also appearing in their second Prince of Asturias Cup final, with the previous one being the one in 1917 that they lost to Centro.

== Route to the final ==
=== The Centro team ===
Centro's route to the final
	Opponent	Result
QF	Galicia	1–0
SF	South team	2–1

In the quarter-finals, Centro took revenge on Galicia (who had eliminated them in the previous season) by beating them 1–0 in Madrid, with the only goal of the game being scored by Antonio De Miguel. In the semi-finals, they met the South team (an Andalusia XI) at the Estadio Metropolitano and they defeated the Andalusians with a 2–1 win thanks to a brace from Juan Monjardín, who would play a pivotal role in the final.

=== Catalonia ===
Catalonia's route to the final
	Opponent	Result
QF	Gipuzkoa	2–1
SF	Biscay	1–0

Like Centro, Catalonia also played its quarter-final and semi-final matches at home, beating Gipuzkoa 2–1 at the Les Corts despite domination from the visiting team, with Catalan goals from Juan Olivella and Juan Pellicer. In the semi-finals, also at Les Corts, Catalonia beat another region from the Basque Country, Biscay, thanks to an early goal from Barcelona player Cristóbal Martí.

Coincidentally, both Centro and Catalonia reached the final off the back of 2–1 and 1–0 victories.

== Summary ==
=== Line-ups ===
Both line-ups were nearly identical to those of the Real Madrid and Barcelona teams at the time. In fact, 8 of the players that started for Centro in the replay, would go on to start for Real Madrid in the 1924 Copa del Rey Final three months later, with the outcasts being Olaso, Caballero and strangely, Bernabéu. On the other hand, 7 of the players that started for Catalonia in the first leg, had been on the line-up of the Barcelona team that won the 1922 Copa del Rey Final 5–1, with the outcasts being Caicedo, Trabal, Martí and Feliu. The only non-Spanish players to have partaken in this final were Argentina's Emili Sagi-Barba of Catalonia and Switzerland's Adolphe Mengotti of Centro.

=== Final ===
The final was played on 24 February 1924 on neutral ground at the San Mamés in Bilbao, resulting in a tremendously competitive clash, with back-and-forth drama on the scoreboard, and up for grabs. Félix Pérez open the scoring within the first 10 minutes of the game, and Centro hold on to the lead for nearly half an hour, until Barcelona player Josep Samitier scored a three-minute brace to turn the score on its head. Centro kept their composure and found an equalizer just three minutes before the break thanks to Monchín Triana. After the break, in the 57th minute, Vicente Piera put the Catalans ahead once more, but the Castilian side managed to level the scores at 3–3 with 15 minutes through Triana, and the result remained unchanged until the end of regulation time, thus forcing extra-time. There, Centro's semi-final hero, Juan Monjardín, scored at the beginning of extra-time to put the Centro team in the lead at 4–3, but with two minutes remaining, when no one was expecting more goals anymore, Emili Sagi-Barba leveled the scores at 4–4, thus salvaging a draw to Catalonia.

=== Replay ===
Sagi's last-minute heroic actions meant that the game had to be repeated two days later, and the replay also was a roller coaster of emotions with back-and-forth drama as Carulla made it 1–0 shortly after the start, but then the Centro team produced a come back of which Monjardín was the sole orchestrator, scoring twice to give a 2–1 lead to his side, but still before the break Samitier and Piera turned the score around yet again, which no longer moved after the break, thus Piera's goal turned out to be the match-winner, and Catalonia become the champions for the second time in the competition's history.

== Final details ==
24 February 1924

Catalonia	4–4 (a.e.t.)	Centro
Samitier 35', 38'; Piera 57'; Sagibarba 118'	Report; Report2	Pérez 8'; Triana 42', 75'; Monjardín 95'

San Mamés, Bilbao
Referee: (Basque Country (autonomous community)) Murguia

GK	1	(Spain) Ricardo Zamora
DF	2	(Spain) José Planas Artés
DF	3	(Spain) Salvador Surroca
MF	4	(Spain) Patricio Caicedo
MF	5	(Spain) Agustín Sancho
MF	6	(Spain) Ramón Trabal (Note: In some sources it's Francesco Sanahuja who is listed as the starter)
FW	7	(Spain) Vicente Piera
FW	8	(Spain) Juan Feliu
FW	9	(Spain) Josep Samitier (c)
FW	10	(Spain) Cristóbal Martí
FW	11	(Argentina) Emili Sagi-Barba
Manager:
?

GK	1	(Spain) Cándido Martínez
DF	2	(Spain) Félix Quesada
DF	3	(Spain) Pololo
MF	4	(Spain) Gonzalo
MF	5	(Switzerland) Adolphe Mengotti
MF	6	(Spain) Ernesto Mejía
FW	7	(Spain) Antonio De Miguel
FW	8	(Spain) Monchín Triana
FW	9	(Spain) Juan Monjardín
FW	10	(Spain) Félix Pérez
FW	11	(Spain) Gerónimo del Campo.
Manager:
?

== Replay details ==
26 February 1924

Catalonia	3–2	Centro
Carulla (1–0); Samitier (2–2); Piera (3–2)	Report; Report2	Monjardín (1–1)

San Mamés, Bilbao
Referee: (Cantabria) Fermín Sánchez

GK	1	(Spain) Ricardo Zamora
DF	2	(Spain) Domingo Massagué
DF	3	(Spain) Joaquín Montané
MF	4	(Spain) Patricio Caicedo
MF	5	(Spain) Agustín Sancho
MF	6	(Spain) Domingo Carulla
FW	7	(Spain) Vicente Piera
FW	8	(Spain) Miguel Peidró
FW	9	(Spain) Josep Samitier (c)
FW	10	(Spain) Cristóbal Martí
FW	11	(Argentina) Emili Sagi-Barba
Manager:
?

GK	1	(Spain) Cándido Martínez
DF	2	(Spain) Félix Quesada
DF	3	(Spain) Alfonso Olaso
MF	4	(Spain) Ricardo Álvarez
MF	5	(Switzerland) Adolphe Mengotti
MF	6	(Spain) Juan Caballero
FW	7	(Spain) José María Muñagorri
FW	8	(Spain) Monchín Triana
FW	9	(Spain) Juan Monjardín
FW	10	(Spain) Santiago Bernabéu (c)
FW	11	(Spain) Gerónimo del Campo.
Manager:
?

== Statistics ==
=== Goalscorers ===
There were 13 goals scored in 2 matches, for an average of 6.5 goals per match.

3 goals

- Juan Monjardín
- (Catalonia) Josep Samitier

2 goals

- (Catalonia) Vicente Piera
- Monchín Triana

1 goal

- (Catalonia) Emili Sagi-Barba
- (Catalonia) Domingo Carulla
- Félix Pérez

== Aftermath ==
Four months after this final, on 26 June 1924, the Prince of Asturias Cup ended up being definitively abolished by the Spanish FA, but one last edition of this Inter-regional tournament was played several months later, in September 1926, between the previous two champions, Asturias and Catalonia, facing-off for the right to keep the trophy. Catalonia won 6–3 on aggregate.

== See also ==
- 1924 Copa del Rey Final
- El Clásico
