= 1922–23 Real Madrid CF season =

21st season in existence of Real Madrid CF

Real Madrid
1922–23 season
- President: Pedro Parages
- Manager: Juan de Cárcer
- Stadium: Campo de O'Donnell; Campo de Ciudad Lineal
- Campeonato Regional Centro (Note: The Campeonato Regional Centro (Central Regional Championship) was a regional league used as a qualifier for the Copa del Rey.): 1st
- Copa Federación Centro: Winners
- Copa del Rey: Quarter-finals
- Top goalscorer: League: Monjardín (5); All: Santiago Bernabéu (8)
- Biggest win: Real Madrid 6–2 Athletic Madrid
- Biggest defeat: Athletic Bilbao 5–0 Real Madrid
Home colours	Away colours

The 1922–23 season was Real Madrid Club de Fútbol's 21st season in existence. The club played some friendly matches. They also played in the Campeonato Regional Centro (Central Regional Championship), the Copa del Rey and the inaugural edition of the Copa Federación Centro (Central Federation Cup).

== Summary ==
Real Madrid left the Campo de O'Donnell and adopted the Campo de Ciudad Lineal as their new home stadium. The Copa del Rey quarterfinal first-leg match against Athletic Bilbao on 25 March 1923 was the club's last home match at the O'Donnell. Real Madrid defeated Real Unión 2-0 in the inaugural match played at the Ciudad Lineal on 29 April 1923.

== Players ==
Note: Flags indicate national team as defined under FIFA eligibility rules; some limited exceptions apply. Players may hold more than one non-FIFA nationality.

No.	Pos.	Nation	Player
—	GK	(Spain) ESP	Cándido Martínez
—	DF	(Spain) ESP	Félix Quesada
—	DF	(Spain) ESP	Patricio Escobal
—	DF	(Spain) ESP	Francisco Lambán
—	MF	(Spain) ESP	Ernesto Mejía
—	MF	(Spain) ESP	Manuel Valderrama
—	MF	(Switzerland) SUI	Adolphe Mengotti
—	MF	(Switzerland) SUI	Arturo Mengotti
—	MF	(Spain) ESP	Narciso Lambán
—	MF	(Spain) ESP	Antonio Sicilia Mendo
—	MF	(Spain) ESP	Juan de Manzanedo

No.	Pos.	Nation	Player
—	MF	(Spain) ESP	Alfonso Medina
—	MF	(Spain) ESP	Román Unanue
—	FW	(Spain) ESP	Félix Pérez
—	FW	(Spain) ESP	José María Muñagorri
—	FW	(Spain) ESP	Gerónimo del Campo
—	FW	(Spain) ESP	Juan Monjardín
—	FW	(Spain) ESP	Antonio de Miguel
—	FW	(Spain) ESP	José María Úbeda
—	FW	(Spain) ESP	Manuel Posada
—	FW	(Spain) ESP	Santiago Bernabéu

== Friendlies ==
17 September 1922 Friendly	RS Gimnástica	1–3	Real Madrid	Madrid
		Report		Stadium: Campo de O'Donnell (Atlético Madrid)
Note: Real Madrid started the match with 10 players, until A. Prieto joined the match. The match was organised partly to raise funds for the Castilian Athletics Federation.

24 September 1922 Friendly - 3rd Reserve	Real Madrid	2–1	Primitiva Amistad de Madrid	Madrid
		Report		Stadium: Campo de O'Donnell
Note: Real Madrid fielded their 3rd reserve team for this match.

1 October 1922 Friendly	Sevilla FC	4–0	Real Madrid	Seville
		Report		Stadium: Campo de la Reina Victoria

3 October 1922 Friendly	Sevilla FC	6–3	Real Madrid	Seville
		Report		Stadium: Campo de la Reina Victoria

12 October 1922 Friendly	RS Gimnástica	1–2	Real Madrid	Madrid
		Report		Stadium: Campo de O'Donnell
Note: Some Real Madrid players played for RS Gimnástica in this match.

17 October 1922 Friendly	FC Barcelona	5–2	Real Madrid	Zaragoza
		Report		Stadium: Delicias
Note: The match was played on the occasion of Fiestas del Pilar.

18 October 1922 Friendly	FC Barcelona	4–2	Real Madrid	Zaragoza
		Report		Stadium: Delicias
Note: The match was played on the occasion of Fiestas del Pilar.

12 November 1922 Friendly - Reserve	Natación Alicante	1–3	Real Madrid	Alicante
		Report		Stadium: La Florida
Note: Real Madrid's reserve team played this match during their tour of Alicante.

13 November 1922 Friendly - Reserve	Natación Alicante	4–1	Real Madrid	Alicante
		Report		Stadium: La Florida
Note: Real Madrid's reserve team played this match during their tour of Alicante.

1 December 1922 Friendly	Real Madrid	1–1	Sevilla FC	Madrid
		Report		Stadium: Campo de O'Donnell

3 December 1922 Friendly	Real Madrid	2–1	Sevilla FC	Madrid
		Report		Stadium: Campo de O'Donnell

14 December 1922 Friendly	Real Madrid (Spain)	3–2	(Germany) FC Pforzheim	Madrid, Spain
		Report		Stadium: Campo de O'Donnell

17 December 1922 Friendly	Real Madrid (Spain)	3–1	(Germany) FC Pforzheim	Madrid, Spain
		Report		Stadium: Campo de O'Donnell

24 December 1922 Friendly	Real Madrid (Spain)	2–0	(Czechoslovakia) SK Čechie Karlín	Madrid, Spain
		Report		Stadium: Campo de O'Donnell

25 December 1922 Friendly	Real Madrid (Spain)	2–2	(Czechoslovakia) SK Čechie Karlín	Madrid, Spain
		Report		Stadium: Campo de O'Donnell

28 December 1922 Friendly	Real Madrid (Spain)	3–4	(Hungary) MTK Budapest	Madrid, Spain
		Report		Stadium: Campo de O'Donnell

31 December 1922 Friendly	Real Madrid (Spain)	1–0	(Hungary) Vasas SC	Madrid, Spain
		Report		Stadium: Campo de O'Donnell

1 January 1923 Friendly	Real Madrid (Spain)	2–1	(Hungary) Vasas SC	Madrid, Spain
		Report		Stadium: Campo de O'Donnell

13 January 1923 Friendly	Real Madrid (Spain)	3–0	(Germany) 1. FC Nürnberg	Madrid, Spain
		Report		Stadium: Campo de O'Donnell

14 January 1923 Friendly	Real Madrid (Spain)	0–3	(Germany) 1. FC Nürnberg	Madrid, Spain
		Report		Stadium: Campo de O'Donnell

29 January 1923 Friendly	Real Madrid (Spain)	2–1	(Austria) SK Rapid Wien	Madrid, Spain
		Report		Stadium: Campo de O'Donnell

13 February 1923 Friendly	Real Madrid (Spain)	7–1	(Switzerland) Servette FC	Madrid, Spain
		Report		Stadium: Campo de O'Donnell

14 February 1923 Friendly	Real Madrid (Spain)	2–1	(Switzerland) Servette FC	Madrid, Spain
		Report		Stadium: Campo de O'Donnell

6 March 1923 Friendly	Real Madrid (Spain)	2–2	(Hungary) Ferencvárosi TC	Madrid, Spain
		Report		Stadium: Campo de O'Donnell

8 March 1923 Friendly	Real Madrid (Spain)	1–2	(Hungary) Ferencvárosi TC	Madrid, Spain
		Report		Stadium: Campo de O'Donnell

1 April 1923 Paris Tournament	BSC Old Boys (Switzerland)	0–1	(Spain) Real Madrid	Paris, France
		Report		Stadium: Stade de Paris

2 April 1923 Paris Tournament	AS Française (France)	0–2	(Spain) Real Madrid	Paris, France
		Report		Stadium: Stade de Paris

8 April 1923 Friendly - Reserve	CD Castellón	1–5	Real Madrid	Castellón
		Report		Stadium: Carretera Valencia
Note: Real Madrid fielded their reserve team for this match.

9 April 1923 Friendly - Reserve	CD Castellón	1–0	Real Madrid	Castellón
		Report		Stadium: Carretera Valencia
Note: Real Madrid fielded their reserve team for this match.

29 April 1923 Friendly	Real Madrid	2–0	Real Unión	Madrid, Spain
		Report		Stadium: Campo de Ciudad Lineal

2 May 1923 Friendly	Real Madrid	1–1	Real Unión	Madrid, Spain
		Report		Stadium: Campo de Ciudad Lineal

12 May 1923 Friendly	Real Madrid (Spain)	1–3	(Czechoslovakia) SK Moravská Slavia Brno	Madrid, Spain
		Report		Stadium: Campo de Ciudad Lineal]

15 May 1923 Friendly	Real Madrid (Spain)	2–4	(England) Nelson F.C.	Madrid, Spain
		Report		Stadium: Campo de Ciudad Lineal

17 May 1923 Friendly	Real Madrid (Spain)	4–1	(England) Nelson F.C.	Madrid, Spain
		Report		Stadium: Campo de Ciudad Lineal

24 May 1923 Friendly	Real Madrid (Spain)	0–2	(Scotland) Dundee F.C.	Madrid, Spain
		Report		Stadium: Campo de Ciudad Lineal

== Competitions ==
=== Overview ===
Competition	First match	Last match	Starting round	Final position	Record							
Competition	First match	Last match	Starting round	Final position	Pld	W	D	L	GF	GA	GD	Win %
Campeonato Regional Centro	15 October 1922	11 March 1923	Matchday 1	Winners	6	3	2	1	12	9	+3	50.00
Copa del Rey	28 March 1920	4 April 1920	Quarter-finals	Quarter-finals	2	0	0	2	1	8	−7	0.00
Copa Federación Centro	6 May 1923	17 June 1923	Quarter-finals	Winners	3	3	0	0	12	4	+8	100.00
Total					11	6	2	3	25	21	+4	54.55

Source: Competitions

=== Campeonato Regional Centro ===
==== League table ====
Pos	Team	Pld	W	D	L	GF	GA	GD	Pts	Qualification
1	Real Madrid (C, Q)	6	3	2	1	12	9	+3	8	Qualification for the Copa del Rey.
2	Athletic Madrid	6	3	1	2	12	10	+2	7	
3	Racing Madrid	6	2	1	3	13	14	−1	5	
4	RS Gimnástica	6	1	2	3	9	13	−4	4	

Source: Rec.Sport.Soccer Statistics Foundation
Rules for classification: 1) points; 2) goal difference; 3) number of goals scored.
(C) Champions; (Q) Qualified for the phase indicated

==== Matches ====
15 October 1922 1	Athletic Madrid	1–2	Real Madrid	Madrid
	Pololo (pen.)	Report	Quesada 9' (pen.); Posada	Stadium: Metropolitano; Referee: Montero

12 November 1922 2	RS Gimnástica	2–2	Real Madrid	Madrid
	Echevarría; Hdez-Coronado	Report	Quesada (pen.); Monjardín 88'	Stadium: Gimnástica; Referee: Larrañaga

10 December 1922 3	Racing de Madrid	2–4	Real Madrid	Madrid
	Caballero 5'; Vicente	Report	De Miguel 40'; Félix Pérez; Monjardín; Quesada (pen.)	Stadium: Racing; Referee: Larrañaga

11 February 1923 4	Real Madrid	1–2	Athletic Madrid	Madrid
	Monjardín	Report	Luís Olaso; Triana	Stadium: Campo de O'Donnell; Referee: Murguía

25 February 1923 5	Real Madrid	1–0	RS Gimnástica	Madrid
	Monjardín 80'	Report		Stadium: Campo de O'Donnell; Referee: Chopeitia

11 March 1923 6	Real Madrid	2–2	Racing de Madrid	Madrid
	Monjardín 10'; Del Campo 20'	Report	Escobal 40' (o.g.); César	Stadium: Campo de O'Donnell; Referee: Murguía

=== Copa del Rey ===
==== Quarter-finals ====
25 March 1923 First leg	Real Madrid	1–3	Athletic Bilbao	Madrid
	S. Bernabéu 1'	Report	Sesumaga 19' (pen.), 28' (pen.), 51'	Stadium: Estadio O'Donnell; Referee: Manuel Lemmel

4 April 1923 Second leg	Athletic Bilbao	5–0	Real Madrid	Bilbao
	Travieso 16', 90'; Laca 62', 87'; Larraza 71'	Report		Stadium: Estadio San Mamés; Referee: Lloveras

=== Copa Federación Centro ===
6 May 1923 Quarterfinals	RS Gimnástica	1–3	Real Madrid	Madrid
	Mocoroa	Report	S. Bernabéu	Stadium: C. Salamanca; Referee: Bidagor

31 May 1923 Semifinals	Racing de Madrid	1–3	Real Madrid	Madrid
	César	Report	F.Pérez; S. Bernabéu; Úbeda	Stadium: Estadio Metropolitano; Referee: Vallana

17 June 1923 Final	Real Madrid	6–2	Athletic Madrid	Madrid
	S. Bernabéu; Posada; Ortueta (o.g.); Posada; S. Bernabéu	Report	Pololo 50' (pen.); Triana	Stadium: Campo de Ciudad Lineal; Referee: Chopeitia
