= 1926 Copa del Rey final =

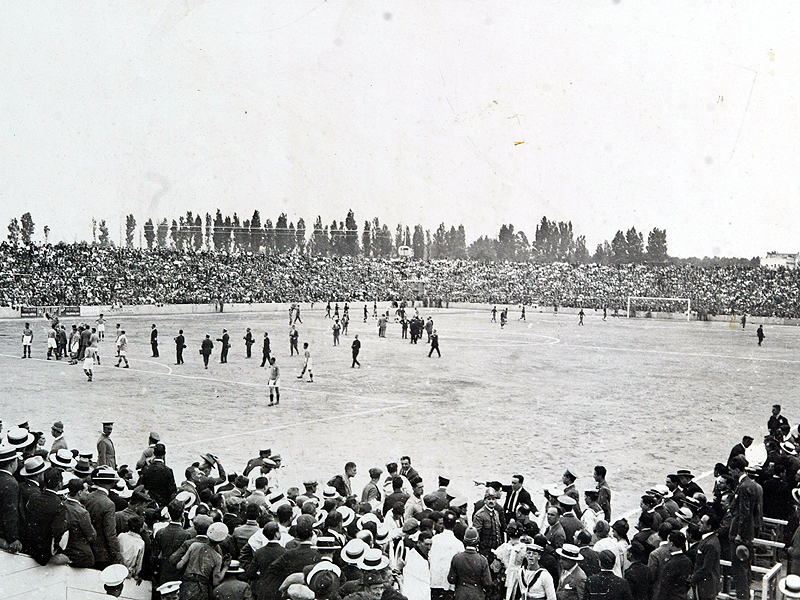
- Mestalla Stadium, venue for the final
- Event: 1926 Copa del Rey
Barcelona	Atlético Madrid
3	2
- (after extra time)
- Date: 16 May 1926
- Venue: Mestalla Stadium, Valencia
- Referee: Pablo Saracho

The 1926 Copa del Rey final was the 26th final of the Spanish cup competition, the Copa del Rey. The final was played at the Mestalla in Valencia on 16 May 1926. Barcelona were huge favourites because they had great international figures such as Josep Samitier, the Filipino Paulino Alcántara and the Argentine Emili Sagi-Barba, and they proved the favouritism by prevailing over Atlético Madrid 10-3 after extra time to win their seventh title.

== Match details ==
16 May 1926
17:30 CET

Barcelona	3–2 (a.e.t.)	Atlético Madrid
Samitier 62'; Just 63'; Alcántara 112'		Palacios 16'; Cosme 58' (pen.)

Mestalla, Valencia
Attendance: 17,000
Referee: Pablo Saracho

Barcelona	Atlético Madrid

GK	1	(Hungary) Ferenc Plattkó
DF	2	(Spain) José Planas Artés
DF	3	(Germany) Emil Walter
MF	4	(Spain) Ramón Torralba
MF	5	(Spain) Agustín Sancho
MF	6	(Spain) Domingo Carulla
FW	7	(Spain) Just
FW	8	(Spain) Vicente Piera
FW	9	(Spain) Josep Samitier
FW	10	(Philippines) Paulino Alcántara
FW	11	(Argentina) Emilio Sagi-Barba
Manager:
(Austria) Richard Kohn

GK	1	(Spain) Javier Barroso
DF	2	(Spain) Pololo
DF	3	(Spain) Alfonso Olaso
MF	4	(Spain) Francisco Marín
MF	5	(Spain) Andrés Tuduri
MF	6	(Spain) Domingo Burdiel
FW	7	(Spain) Antonio de Miguel
FW	8	(Spain) Monchín Triana
FW	9	(Spain) Vicente Palacios
FW	10	(Spain) Cosme Vázquez
FW	11	(Spain) Luis Olaso
Manager:
(England) Fred Pentland

1926 Copa del Rey winners
Barcelona
7th title
