= Armando Sagi =

Spanish footballer (1906–1997)

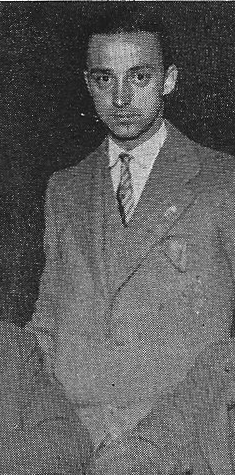
- Sagi in 1930

Personal information
- Full name: Armando Martínez Sagi
- Date of birth: 28 April 1906
- Place of birth: Barcelona, Spain
- Date of death: 11 July 1997 (aged 91)
- Place of death: Montevideo, Uruguay
- Position: Forward

Senior career*
Years	Team	Apps	(Gls)
1919–1923	Barcelona		
1923–1924	Júpiter		
1924–1925	Barcelona		
1928–1929	Alfonso XIII		

International career
1921	Catalonia	1	(0)
- * Club domestic league appearances and goals

Armando Martínez Sagi (28 April 1906 – 11 July 1997) was a Spanish footballer who played as a forward for FC Barcelona and Alfonso XIII (now known as RCD Mallorca). He won two Copa del Rey titles with Barça, in 1922 and 1925, but he is best known for being the club's youngest-ever player and scorer in an official competitive match, which he achieved in 1920 at the age of 14.

He is the brother of Ana María Martínez Sagi, the first woman director of FC Barcelona, and cousin of Emili Sagi-Barba, who also played for Barcelona. In addition to football, Sagi also played tennis and billiards, becoming a world trick shot champion in fantasy billiards with caroms in 1932 and runner-up in 1933.

== Playing career ==
=== Early career ===
Born in Barcelona, Catalonia, Sagi began his football career in the youth departments of his hometown club, FC Barcelona. He rose through the ranks quickly, and in the 1919–20 season, despite his tender age of just 13, Sagi played six friendly matches for the club's first team.

=== 1920–21 season ===
In the 1920–21 season, Sagi made his official competitive debut for Barça against FC Internacional (2–2) in the Catalan Championship held in Sants at the Camp del career Galileu on 14 November 1920, at the age of 14 years and 200 days, thus becoming the youngest player in the club's history, breaking the previous record set by Paulino Alcántara in 1912 (15 years and 140 days). In this match, Barça's coach Jack Greenwell fielded Sagi as a winger on the left wing as the alternative for the absentee Fernando Plaza, and the chronicles of that time stated that this change "was a success since the aforementioned boy [Sagi] now knows how to play much more than Plaza". Sagi still is the only 14-year-old that Barcelona has ever fielded, and following Sagi's debut, Barça did not field another 15-year-old player for over a century until Lamine Yamal in 2023, aged 15 years and 290 days.

The nice figure of Martínez Sagi, who was simply marvelous on Sunday, resolutely advanced towards the goal, outwitting one of Avenç's formidable defenders, and with a wonderful low shot, he achieved the tie and a much bigger applause.

— The 1921 Avenç match chronicle of La Vanguardia, describing Sagi's first goal for Barcelona.

Four months later, on 6 March 1921, Sagi scored his first official competitive goal for Barcelona, netting a brace in a 3–1 win over Avenç de l'Sport in the first leg of a Catalan Championship play-off set to decide the winner (as they had finished level on points), which Barça eventually won. In doing so at the age of 14 years and 307 days, he became the youngest scorer in the club's history, breaking the previous record which had also been set by Alcántara in 1912, although the Philippine managed to seal a hat-trick, unlike Sagi, who finished the 1920–21 season with five competitive matches, scoring twice.

As a Barcelona player, Sagi was eligible to play for the Catalonia national team, but he was selected only once, in a friendly against Provence in April 1921.

=== 1921–22 season ===
In the 1921–22 season, the 15-year-old Sagi scored four goals in six competitive matches, including his Copa del Rey debut on 2 April 1922, in the first leg of the semifinals against Sporting de Gijón, becoming, at the age of 15 years and 339 days, the youngest semifinalist in the competition's history, a record that he still holds. By playing in this match, Sagi was part of the squad that then won the 1922 title. Unlike the Catalan championship, which was regional, the Copa del Rey is a national competition, and thus some sources wrongly identify this match as Sagi's "official" debut, which led to many news outlets to wrongly claim that Yamal, at the age of 15 years and 290 days, had broken Sagi's 100-year-old record.

=== Golden age ===
Sagi played for Barça during the club's first golden age, which won two Catalan championships and one Copa del Rey between 1920 and 1923; however, he did not play a major role in these triumphs because that golden age prevented him from often playing in a first-team consisting of players such as Vicente Piera, Josep Samitier, Ricardo Zamora, Agustín Sancho, Alcántara and his cousin Sagi-Barba. He was usually the first substitute of the three attacking players and when he played, Sagi often demonstrated his qualities and his shooting power. Due to the impossibility of finding a place among the then "untouchables", Sagi decided to leave the club in 1923.

Sagi played the 1923–24 season with CE Júpiter, but then returned to Barcelona in the 1924–25 season, during which he only played a single official match, in the Copa del Rey, thus belonging to the squad that then won the domestic cup title in 1925. In total, Sagi scored six goals in 14 official matches and 21 goals in 96 unofficial matches.

=== Later career ===
After a 3-year hiatus, the 22-year-old Sagi played one last season of football in 1928–29 with the Alfonso XIII club, the forerunner of RCD Mallorca. Later he would stand out in billiards, becoming a true juggler of cues and balls, and proclaiming himself world champion in May 1932 in the Classic Fantasy modality in Lille. Coincidentally, another former Barcelona player, Claudi Puigvert, finished third in the same tournament, but he would also become world billiards champion, two years later. As a result of this triumph, on 5 June 1932, Sagi received a tribute at the Camp de Les Corts, walking out into the field to do the honor of taking the symbolic kick-off between Barça and Celta de Vigo in the first leg of the semi-finals of the 1932 Copa del Presidente de la República.

== Death ==
Sagi died on 11 July 1997, at the age of 91, in a hospital in Montevideo (Uruguay), the country to which he had emigrated and from which he obtained nationality.

== Honours ==
Barcelona

Copa del Rey:

- Champions (2): 1922 and 1925

Catalan championship:

- Champions (2): 1921 and 1922
