= 1921–22 FC Barcelona season =

23rd season in existence of FC Barcelona

FC Barcelona
1921–22 season
- President: Hans Gamper
- Manager: Jack Greenwell
- Campionat de Catalunya: First
- Campionat d'Espanya: Champion

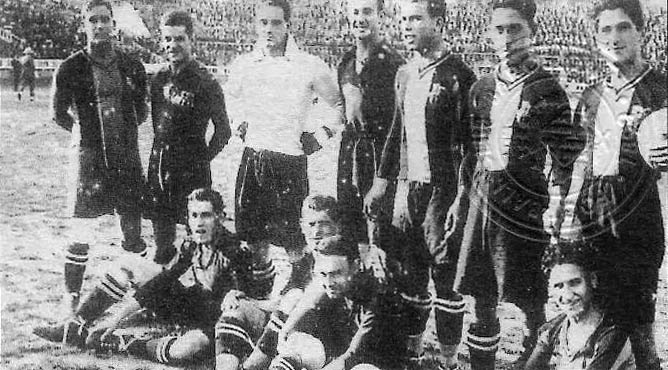
FC Barcelona team in 1922

The 1921–22 season was the 23rd season for FC Barcelona.

== Events ==
Joan Gamper again took over presidency of the Club.

== Results ==
Friendly

4 September 1921	FC Barcelona	3 - 0	Select Catalonia	Barcelona
	Alcantara; Gràcia			Stadium: Camp del carrer Indústria; Referee: Peris

8 September 1921	FC Barcelona	3 - 0	CE Júpiter	Barcelona
	Piera; Gràcia			Stadium: Camp del carrer Indústria; Referee: Ferrer Elias

11 September 1921	FC Barcelona	5 - 0	Terrassa FC	Barcelona
	Piera; Martinez; Sagi; Sancho; Gràcia			Stadium: Camp del carrer Indústria; Referee: Vela

? September 1921	FC Barcelona	4 - 0	FC Internacional	Barcelona
	Cella I Cella II; Picola			Stadium: Santa Perpètua de Mogoda

18 September 1921	CE Júpiter	3 - 4	FC Barcelona	Barcelona
			Piera; Gràcia	Stadium: Poble Nou; Referee: Bachs

24 September 1921	FC Barcelona	5 - 0	S.L. Benfica	Barcelona
	Gràcia; Martinez; Sancho; Piera			Stadium: Industria; Referee: Peris

25 September 1921	FC Barcelona	5 - 2	S.L. Benfica	Barcelona
	Gràcia; Vinyals; Cella I Piera			Stadium: Industria; Referee: Torrens

2 October 1921	FC Internacional	3 - 3	FC Barcelona	Barcelona
			Piera; Sancho	Stadium: Internacional; Referee: Turon

9 October 1921	Terrassa FC	0 - 2	FC Barcelona	Barcelona
			Piera; Gràcia	Stadium: Terrassa; Referee: Tarrida

30 September 1921	FC Barcelona	2 - 2	Real Sporting de Gijón	Barcelona
	Gràcia			Stadium: Industria; Referee: Peris

1 November 1921	FC Barcelona	4 - 0	Real Sporting de Gijón	Barcelona
	Martinez Sagi; Piera; Gràcia			Stadium: Industria; Referee: Cruella

8 December 1921	FC Barcelona	4 - 1	Racing Club de Madrid	Barcelona
	Planas; Piera; Gràcia; Martinez			Stadium: Industria; Referee: Marine

11 December 1921	FC Barcelona	4 - 0	Racing Club de Madrid	Barcelona
	Planas; Piera; Martinez			Stadium: Industria; Referee: Peris

25 December 1921	FC Barcelona	2 - 3	AC Sparta Praha	Barcelona
	Planas; Alcantara			Stadium: Montjuïc; Referee: F.Bru

26 December 1921	FC Barcelona	2 - 0	AC Sparta Praha	Barcelona
	Planas; Alcantara			Stadium: Montjuïc; Referee: Cruella

1 January 1922	FC Barcelona	1 - 2	Boldklubben FC	Barcelona
	Gràcia			Stadium: Montjuïc; Referee: Marine

3 January 1922	FC Barcelona	4 - 1	Boldklubben FC	Barcelona
	Martinez; Gràcia; Vinyals			Stadium: Industria; Referee: Peris

6 January 1922	FC Barcelona	0 - 2	Boldklubben FC	Barcelona
				Stadium: Montjuïc; Referee: Comorera

8 January 1922	FC Barcelona	1 - 0	AFK Union Žižkov	Barcelona
	Piera			Stadium: Montjuïc; Referee: Llovera

1 February 1922	FC Barcelona	4 - 2	Rapid Wien	Barcelona
	Alcantara; Gràcia; Martinez			Stadium: Industria; Referee: Wunkler

2 February 1922	FC Barcelona	6 - 1	Servette FC	Barcelona
	Alcantara; Sagi; Martinez			Stadium: Industria; Referee: Marine

5 February 1922	FC Barcelona	6 - 2	Servette FC	Barcelona
	Gràcia; Cella I Piera			Stadium: Industria; Referee: Cruella

23 February 1922	FC Barcelona	3 - 1	Marins Anglesos	Barcelona
	Gràcia; Alcantara; Planas			Stadium: Industria; Referee: Peris

26 February 1922	FC Barcelona	6 - 1	Marins Anglesos	Barcelona
	Piera; Martinez; Martinez Sagi; Gràcia			Stadium: Industria; Referee: Cruella

15 March 1922	FC Madrid	2 - 2	FC Barcelona	Madrid
			Martinez; Gràcia	Stadium: O, Donnell; Referee: Corona

25 March 1922	FC Barcelona	5 - 3	1. HŠK Građanski Zagreb	Barcelona
	Vinyals; Planas; Martinez Sagi; Samitier; Sagi			Stadium: Industria; Referee: Comorera

26 March 1922	FC Barcelona	3 - 0	1. HŠK Građanski Zagreb	Barcelona
	Martinez; Samitier; Sagi			Stadium: Industria; Referee: Peris

16 April 1922	FC Barcelona	8 - 1	Crook Town A.F.C.	Barcelona
	Martinez; Homs; Alcantara			Stadium: Industria; Referee: Marine

17 April 1922	FC Barcelona	2 - 2	Crook Town A.F.C.	Barcelona
	Homs; Planas			Stadium: Industria; Referee: Cruella

22 April 1922	FC Barcelona	1 - 3	Crook Town A.F.C.	Barcelona
	Martinez			Stadium: Industria; Referee: Greenwell

30 April 1922	FC Barcelona	2 - 2	Civil Service FC	Barcelona
	Arnet; Gràcia			Stadium: Industria; Referee: Torrens

20 May 1922 Inaguracio del camp	FC Barcelona	2 - 1	St. Mirren FC	Barcelona
	Alcantara; Birrel equip contrari			Stadium: Les Corts; Attendance: 22.000; Referee: Edwards

21 May 1922	FC Barcelona	1 - 0	St. Mirren FC	Barcelona
	Gràcia			Stadium: Les Corts; Referee: Edwards

27 May 1922	FC Barcelona	2 - 4	Notts County Football Club	Barcelona
	Gràcia			Stadium: Les Corts; Referee: Edwards

28 May 1922	FC Barcelona	1 - 1	Notts County Football Club	Barcelona
	Samitier			Stadium: Les Corts; Referee: Vela

4 June 1922	FC Barcelona	3 - 0	Athletic Club	Barcelona
	Mallorqui; Blanco; Samitier			Stadium: Les Corts; Referee: Marine

5 June 1922	FC Barcelona	2 - 3	Athletic Club	Barcelona
	Mallorqui			Stadium: Les Corts; Referee: Cruella

11 June 1922	FC Barcelona	5 - 1	Ilford F.C.	Barcelona
	Torralba; Gràcia; Sagi; Samitier			Stadium: Les Corts; Referee: Peris

15 June 1922	FC Barcelona	2 - 2	Ilford F.C.	Barcelona
	Gràcia; Planas			Stadium: Les Corts; Referee: Comorera

25 June 1922	AD Guíxols	1 - 6	FC Barcelona	Girona
				Stadium: Sant Feliu de Guíxols

27 June 1922	Joventut Republicana	0 - 2	FC Barcelona	Barcelona
				Stadium: Lleida; Referee: Jack Greenwell

29 June 1922	Girona FC	2 - 5	FC Barcelona	Barcelona
			Samitier; Planas; Gràcia	Stadium: Girona; Referee: Vela

30 June 1922	Joventut Republicana	1 - 3	FC Barcelona	Barcelona
			Cella II	Stadium: Lleida; Referee: Jack Greenwell

2 July 1922	FC Barcelona	2 - 1	CF Badalona	Barcelona
	Samitier; Planas			Stadium: El Masnou; Referee: Cruella

9 July 1922	Premianenc FC	1 - 5	FC Barcelona	Barcelona
			Cella II; Vinyals; Cella I	Stadium: Premià de Mar; Referee: Folch

16 July 1922	Reus Deportiu	1 - 9	FC Barcelona	Barcelona
			Vinyals; Piera; Mallorqui; Martinez Sagi; Gràcia	Stadium: Camid, Aleixar Reus; Referee: Llop

21 July 1922	FC Palafrugell	0 - 4	FC Barcelona	Barcelona
			Samitier; Cella II	Stadium: Palafrugell; Referee: Rius

23 July 1922	FC Barcelona	0 - 1	UE Sants	Barcelona
				Stadium: Palafrugell; Referee: Rius

30 July 1922	València CF	2 - 3	FC Barcelona	València
			Campins; Cella II	Stadium: Mestalla; Referee: Arribas

2 August 1922	València CF	2 - 4	FC Barcelona	València
			Mallorqui; Cella I Gràcia	Stadium: Mestalla; Referee: Casadesus primera part i Berraondo segona part

6 August 1922	CE Manresa	2 - 3	FC Barcelona	Barcelona
			Samitier	Stadium: Manresa; Referee: Peris

? August 1922	UE Figueres	4 - 2	FC Barcelona	Barcelona
			Zamora	Stadium: Figueres; Referee: Robert

? August 1922	UE Figueres	0 - 1	FC Barcelona	Barcelona
				Stadium: Figueres; Referee: Robert

15 August 1922	CF Badalona	1 - 4	FC Barcelona	Barcelona
			Blanco; Vinyals; Mallorqui; Martinez Sagi	Stadium: Badalona; Referee: Peris

20 August 1922	FC Barcelona	3 - 0	FC Espanya	Barcelona
	Gràcia; Vinyals; Cella II			Stadium: Camí de l'Àngel Tarragona; Referee: Casas

27 August 1922	Joventut Republicana	0 - 10	FC Barcelona	Barcelona
			Alcantara; Gràcia; Cella I Cella II	Stadium: Lleida; Referee: Greenwell

2 September 1922	FC Barcelona	5 - 2	FC Martinenc	Barcelona
	Gràcia; Riera; Alcantara			Stadium: Granollers; Referee: Sojo

Campionat de Catalunya

16 October 1921 Jornada 1	FC Barcelona	5 - 2	CS Sabadell	Barcelona
	Martínez; Gràcia; Torralba; Martínez Sagi		Mateu p.p.	Stadium: Camp del carrer Indústria; Referee: Llobera

23 October 1921 Jornada 2	FC Barcelona	4 - 1	CE Europa	Barcelona
	Martínez Sagi; Alcántara; Gràcia		Goal	Stadium: Camp del carrer Indústria; Referee: Cruella

6 November 1921 Jornada 3	Avenç de l'Sport	1 - 7	FC Barcelona	Barcelona
	Bordas		Martínez; Gràcia; Alcántara; Piera	Referee: Mariné

13 November 1921 Jornada 4	FC Internacional	2 - 5	FC Barcelona	Barcelona
	Solà		Gràcia; Planas; Alcántara p.p.	Stadium: Camp del carrer Galileu; Referee: Lloberas

20 November 1921 Jornada 5	RCD Español	0 - 9	FC Barcelona	Barcelona
			Gràcia; Alcántara; Martínez	Stadium: Velòdrom Parc d'Sports; Referee: Villena

4 December 1921 Jornada 7	CE Europa	1 - 1	FC Barcelona	Barcelona
	Julià		Alcántara	Referee: Villena

15 January 1922 Jornada 8	FC Barcelona	9 - 0	FC Internacional	Barcelona
	Gràcia; Martínez; Piera; Sagi			Stadium: Camp del carrer Indústria; Referee: Cruella

22 January 1922 Jornada 9	FC Barcelona	10 - 0	RCD Español	Barcelona
	Martínez; Gràcia; Alcántara; Sagi			Stadium: Camp del carrer Indústria; Referee: Torrens

29 January 1922 Jornada 6	CS Sabadell	0 - 5	FC Barcelona	Sabadell
			Alcántara; Gràcia; Martínez	Stadium: Camp de la Creu Alta; Referee: Mariné

12 February 1922 Jornada 10	FC Barcelona	8 - 1	Avenç de l'Sport	Barcelona
15:15	Alcántara; Planas; Gràcia; Martínez		Coca	Stadium: Camp del carrer Indústria; Referee: Sanpere

Campionat d'Espanya

12 March 1922 Quarts de final - anada	FC Sevilla	0 - 1	FC Barcelona	Sevilla
			Piera 70'	Stadium: Reina Victòria; Attendance: 9.000; Referee: Carcer

19 March 1922 Quarts de final - tornada	FC Barcelona	7 - 1	FC Sevilla	Barcelona
	Alcántara 2' 23' 86'; Samitier 22'; Gràcia 27' 59'; Planas 80'		Spencer	Stadium: Camp del carrer Indústria; Referee: Gutiérrez (Biscaia)

2 April 1922 Semifinals - anada	Real Sporting de Gijón	1 - 1	FC Barcelona	Gijón
	Bango		Planas	Stadium: Estadi El Molinón; Referee: Vallana (Biscaia)

9 April 1922 Semifinale - tornada	FC Barcelona	7 - 2	Real Sporting de Gijón	Barcelona
	Planas; Gràcia; Alcántara; Sagi		Bango	Stadium: Camp del carrer Indústria; Referee: Montero (Centro)

14 May 1922 Finale	FC Barcelona	5 - 1	Real Unión Club	Vigo
16:30	Torralba 22'; Samitier; Alcántara 90'; Gràcia 85'		Arabolaza 30'	Stadium: Estadio de Coia; Attendance: 12.000; Referee: Balways
