= 1922 Copa del Rey final =

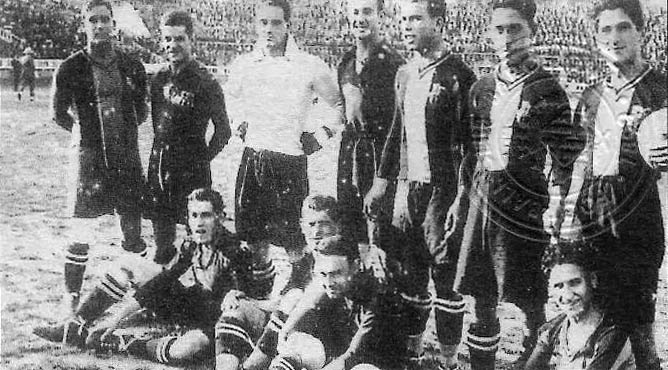
- Team of Barcelona in 1922
- Event: 1922 Copa del Rey
FC Barcelona	Real Unión
5	1
- Date: 14 May 1922
- Venue: Coia, Vigo
- Referee: Thomas Balvay

The 1922 Copa del Rey final was the 22nd final of the Spanish cup competition, the Copa del Rey. The final was played at Campo de Coia, in Vigo, on 14 May 1922. Barcelona easily defeated Real Unión 5–1 and won their fifth title. The Catalan goals were scored by Ramón Torralba, Josep Samitier, Paulino Alcántara (2) and Clemente Gràcia.

This match was marked by a monumental brawl between Barcelona defender Salvador Surroca and Real Unión forward Patricio, which prompted a field invasion and the suspension of the match for 20 minute.

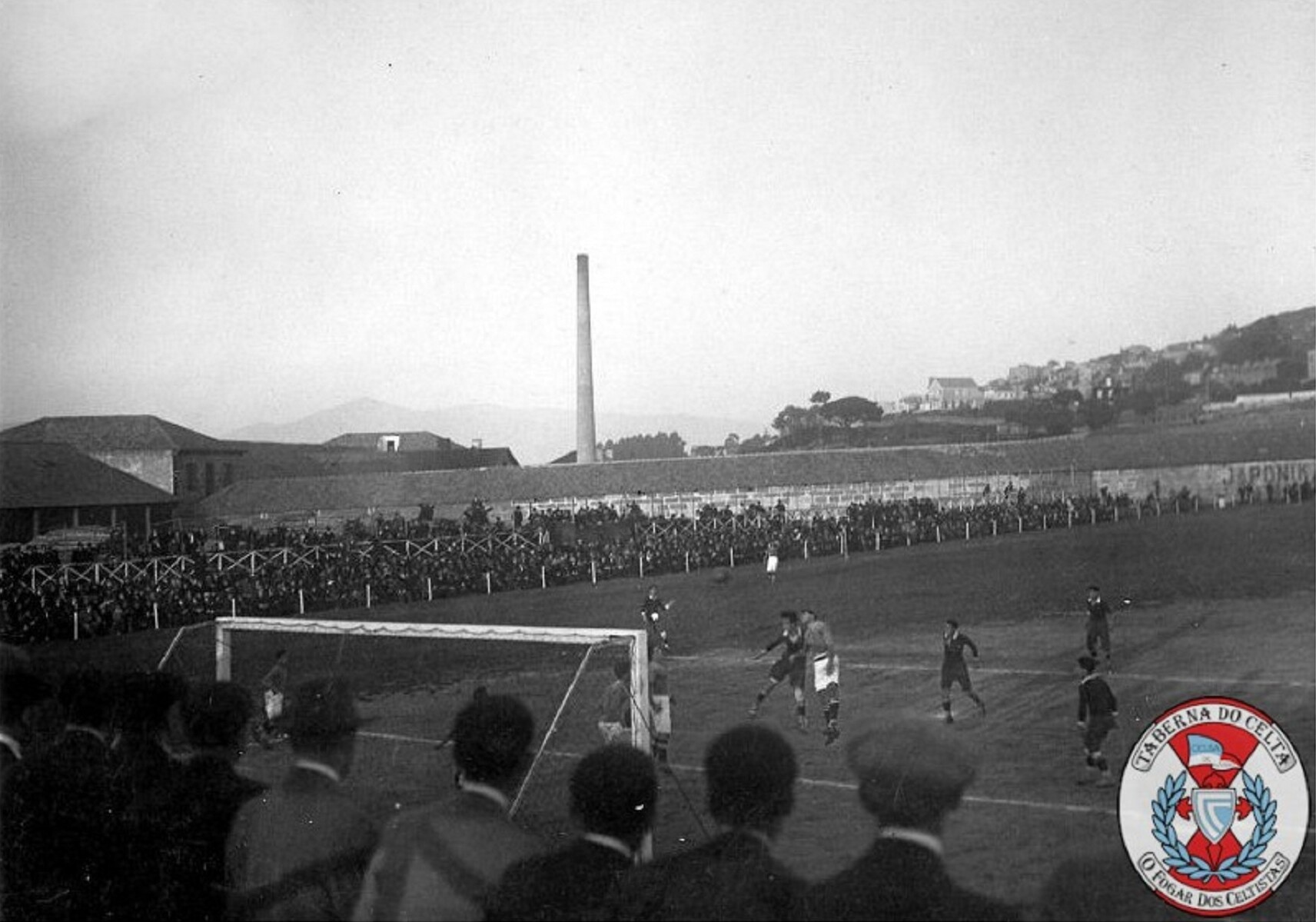
Campo de Coia in Vigo, venue for the final

== Summary ==
In the first half, Real Unión dominated the game and possession, but this did not translate into clear scoring opportunities. On the other hand, Jack Greenwell's Barcelona was much more effective in front of goal, and scored the first goal in the 22nd minute with a shot from Ramón Torralba that surprised Domingo Muguruza. This served as a wake-up call for the Irundarra team, who responded with a relentless wave of attacks on Barça's goal, and the Catalans failed to resist Unión's siege, because in a Corner kick taken by the Black and Whites, there was a riot that ended with the ball inside the goal, with the final touch belonging to Patricio. The goal renewed the team and in the next few minutes appeared that the "unionists" could turn the result around, however, a header from Josep Samitier made it 2–1, and on the stroke of half-time, Paulino Alcántara scored the 3–1 that seemed to seal the game.

However, the second half was almost completely dominated by Real Unión, but again they were unable to score any goals, due to good performances from Barça's defenders José Planas Artés and Salvador Surroca, and especially, of goalkeeper Ricardo Zamora, who made some superb saves. With six minutes left in the game, Surroca brought down Patricio in the area and the referee Thomas Balvay did not signal anything, prompting a field invasion. The match was suspended for 20 minutes until the Irundarras decided to return to the field. However, they forgot to bring their heads with them and Barcelona took the opportunity to score two goals in the final minutes, through Clemente Gràcia and Alcántara, leaving the final score at 5–1.

== Match details ==
14 May 1922
16:30 CET

FC Barcelona	5–1	Real Unión
Torralba 22'; Samitier 41'; Alcántara 45', 90'; Gràcia 85'	Report1; Report2	30' Patricio

Campo de Coia, Vigo
Attendance: 12,000
Referee: Thomas Balvay

Barcelona	Real Unión

GK	1	(Spain) Ricardo Zamora
DF	2	(Spain) José Planas Artés
DF	3	(Spain) Salvador Surroca
MF	4	(Spain) Ramón Torralba
MF	5	(Spain) Agustín Sancho
MF	6	(Spain) Josep Samitier
FW	7	(Spain) Vicente Piera
FW	8	(Spain) Vicente Martínez
FW	9	(Spain) Clemente Gràcia
FW	10	(Spain) Paulino Alcántara (c)
FW	11	(Spain) Emili Sagi-Barba
Manager:
(England) Jack Greenwell

GK	1	(Spain) Domingo Muguruza
DF	2	(Spain) Ignacio Berges
DF	3	(Spain) Román Emery
MF	4	(Spain) Francisco Gamborena
MF	5	(France) René Petit
MF	6	(Spain) Ramón Eguiazábal
FW	7	(Spain) José Echeveste
FW	8	(Spain) José Luis Zabala
FW	9	(Spain) Patricio
FW	10	(Spain) Ramón Azurza
FW	11	(Spain) Elías Acosta

Copa del Rey
1922 winners
FC Barcelona
Fifth title

== Aftermath ==
The incidents of that game led to the suspension of Patricio for one year and a fine of 500 pesetas for Real Unión, which at the time was a heavy fine. The one-year suspension effectively led to the retirement of Patricio, who was almost 30 years old and had been playing football since he was 17.
