= Salvador Surroca =

Spanish footballer

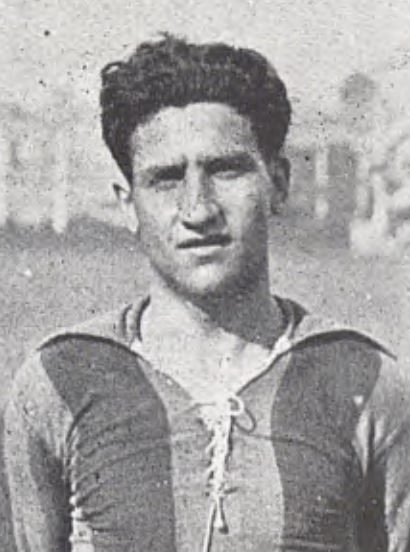

Personal information
- Full name: Salvador Martínez Surroca
- Date of birth: 8 February 1901
- Place of birth: Cieza, Region of Murcia, Spain
- Date of death: 21 August 1974 (aged 73)
- Place of death: Barcelona, Catalonia, Spain
- Position: Defender

Senior career*
Years	Team	Apps	(Gls)
1920–1926	FC Barcelona		
1926–1927	FC Lleida		
1927–1928	CE Manresa		
1929–1932	FC Tàrrega		

International career
1923–1924	Catalonia	+3	(0)
- * Club domestic league appearances and goals

Salvador Martínez Surroca (8 February 1901 - 21 August 1974) was a Spanish footballer who played as a defender for FC Barcelona.

== Club career ==
Born in the Region of Murcia, he moved to Sant Just Desvern when he was still a child. Surroca began his career with FC Barcelona in 1920, being a member of a legendary Barcelona team, coached by Jack Greenwell, that also included Paulino Alcántara, Sagibarba, Ricardo Zamora and Josep Samitier. During his time at the club he helped them win three Championat de Catalunya titles (1921–22, 1923–24 and 1925–26) and three Copa del Rey (1922, 1925 and 1926). Because of the existence of his teammate Vicente Martínez, he become known in the football world by his last name, Surroca, from a very early age, which was very uncommon among the Catalans.

He occupied the defensive position, where he stood out for his forcefulness, of which he gave plenty of evidence, for example, during the 1922 Copa del Rey Final held on 14 May 1922 at Campo de Coia, in which with six minutes left in the game, Surroca brought down Real Unión player Patricio in the area, prompting a monumental brawl, which including a field invasion, with the match being suspended for more than twenty minutes, causing a great scandal. In the end, Barça prevailed with a resounding 5–1 victory.

In 1926 he joined FC Lleida and in 1927 CE Manresa. In 1929 Surroca won a position as a teacher and moved to the town of El Talladell, in the province of Lleida. There he combined his teaching work with the practice of amateur football in the team of FC Tàrrega, playing with them for three years between 1929 and 1932. During this last campaign, he won the Lleida provincial championship.

== International career ==
Like many other FC Barcelona players of that time, Surroca played several matches for the Catalonia national team, and he was part of the team that won the 1923–24 Prince of Asturias Cup, an inter-regional competition organized by the RFEF. Surroca started in the final against a Madrid XI and conceded 4 goals in a 4–4 draw, which cost him his place to the team's backup defender, Joaquín Montané, who started in the second leg as Catalonia won 3–2, thus lifting the trophy for the third time in the team's history.

== Honours ==
=== Club ===
Barcelona

- Catalan Championships:
  - Winners (4) 1920–21, 1921–22, 1923–24 and 1925–26
- Copa del Rey:
  - Winners (3) 1922, 1925 and 1926

=== International ===
Catalonia

Prince of Asturias Cup:

- Champions (1): 1923–24
