= Pololo (footballer) =

Spanish footballer

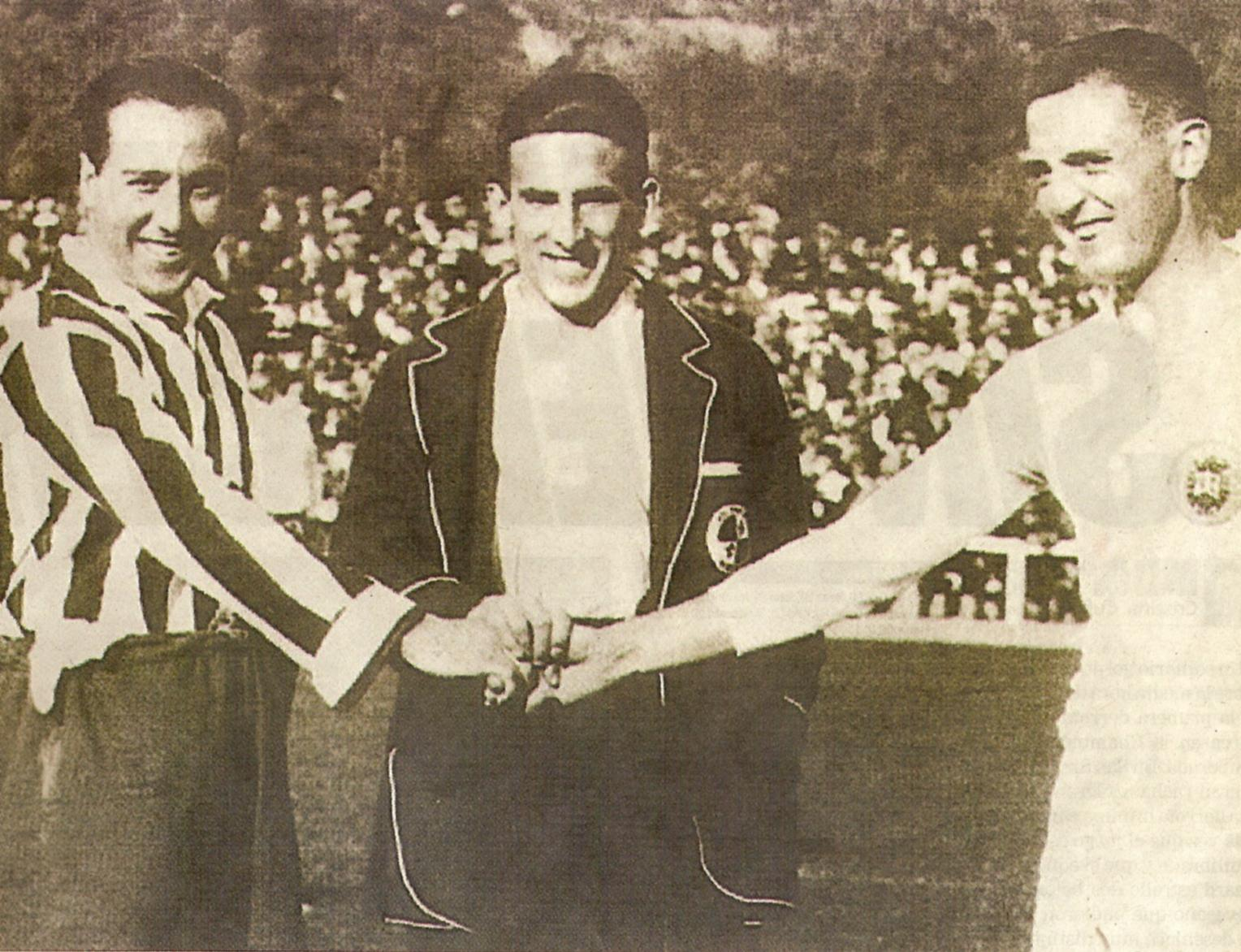
- Pololo (right) and Bernabéu (left) in 1922

Personal information
- Full name: Miguel Durán Terry
- Date of birth: 5 August 1901
- Place of birth: Lugones, Asturias, Spain
- Date of death: 1 October 1934 (aged 33)
- Place of death: Spain
- Position: Defender

Senior career*
| Years | Team | Apps | (Gls) |
| 1919–1926 | Athletic Madrid | 44 | (8) |
| 1926–1929 | Real Oviedo | | |

International career
| 1921–1923 | Spain | 2 | (0) |
| 1923–1924 | Madrid | 2 | (0) |
- * Club domestic league appearances and goals

Miguel Durán Terry, better known by his nickname Pololo (5 August 1901 – October 1934), was a Spanish footballer who played as a defender for Athletic Madrid. He was assassinated in Oviedo during the Asturias Revolution of 1934.

== Club career ==
Miguel Durán Terry was born in Asturias as the only son of Miguel Durán Walkinshaw, director of la fábrica de Explosivos de Coruño y Santa Bárbara (an Explosives factory). At the end of the second decade of the 20th century, he went to Madrid to study a career as a Mining Engineer, in whose High School the Athletic Club of Madrid (currently known as Atlético Madrid) had been created a few years before.

Pololo joined Atlético in 1919, which was also the same year Monchín Triana arrived at the club. Together with Sansinenea, Miguel Mieg and fellow foreign student Ramón Olalquiaga, he was a key element in the club's triumph at the 1920–21 Centro Championship, the club's first-ever piece of silverware, and then he helped Atlético reach the 1921 Copa del Rey Final, where they were beaten 1–4 by Athletic Bilbao. After finishing his studies, he returned to Asturias to join the family business. However, he continued to be enrolled in the ranks of Atlético Madrid until 1926, traveling on his own motorcycle to the capital of Spain or wherever he was to play away games. He was once again pivotal in helping the club reach the 1926 Copa del Rey Final, which they also lost, this time 2–3 to FC Barcelona. It can be said that Pololo along with teammate Triana, contributed to turning Atlético Madrid into an important team in the capital. In total he made 44 appearances and netted 8 goals in 7 years.

In 1926, when Real Oviedo was created, Pololo decided to join the team, featuring alongside the likes of José Luis Zabala and Rogelio Barril, and he remained in the club until his retirement in 1929.

== International career ==
He played two matches for the Spain national football team in 1921 and 1923, both of which were friendlies against Portugal and both ended in victories, with Pololo helping his side keep a clean sheet on the latter one.

As an Athletic Madrid player, Pololo was eligible to play for the Madrid national team, and he was part of the team that reached the final of the 1923–24 Prince of Asturias Cup, an inter-regional competition organized by the RFEF. Pololo started in the final against Catalonia and conceded 4 goals in a 4–4 draw, which cost him his place to the team's backup defender, Alfonso Olaso, who started in the second leg which Madrid lost 2–3.

== Death ==
At the start of the Asturias Revolution of 1934, Miguel Durán, along with his father and other engineers, was assassinated.

== Honours ==
=== Club ===
Athletic Madrid

- La Liga (1): 1928–29
- Copa del Rey (4): 1922, 1925, 1926 and 1928

=== International ===
Madrid XI

Prince of Asturias Cup:

- Runner-up (1): 1923–24
