= Miss Grand Zaragoza =

Provincial pageant in Spain

- Formation: 18 February 2022; 4 years ago
- Founder: Sileina Bozo
- Type: Beauty pageant
- Headquarters: Zaragoza
- Location: Spain
- Members: Miss Grand Spain
- Official language: Spanish

Miss Grand Zaragoza is a Spanish provincial female beauty pageant founded in 2022, aiming to select representatives from the province of Zaragoza for the Miss Grand Spain national competition.

Since the first competition in the Miss Grand Spain pageant, Zaragoza's representatives have not won the main title yet. The highest placement they obtained was the second runner-up in 2022, won by Anakristina Rivero.

== History ==
From 2017 to 2019, after Vicente Gonzalez began franchising the provincial competitions to individual organizers in 2016, the representatives of the province of Zaragoza for Miss Grand Spain were appointed. Later in 2022, the competition license for Miss Grand Zaragoza was granted to a team of organizers led by Sileina Bozo, who later organized the first Miss Grand Zaragoza competition on 18 February 2022, at the Teatro de las Esquinas, Delicias. The contest consisted of 16 contestants who qualified for the final round through several screening events. Of whom, a Venezuelan model residing in Zaragoza, Anakristina Rivero, was named the winner.

== Editions ==
The following table details Miss Grand Zaragoza's annual editions since 2016.

Edition	Date	Final venue	Entrants	Winner	Ref.
1st	18 February 2022	Teatro de las Esquinas, Delicias	16	Anakristina Rivero	
2nd	9 December 2022	Teatro de las Esquinas, Delicias	13	Lara Gil Barranco	
3rd	27 January 2024	Teatro Colegio Corazonistas La Mina, Paseo de la Mina	16	Leyre Escobedo	

== National competition ==
The following is a list of Zaragoza representatives who competed at the Miss Grand Spain national pageant.

Year	Representative	Original provincial title	Placement at Miss Grand Spain	Ref.
2017	Luisa González	Appointed	Unplaced	
2018	Joaquina Tais	1st runner-up Miss Grand Sevilla 2018	Top 10	
2019	Mariana D'orazio Gómez	Miss Grand Cantabria 2019 finalist	Top 10	
No national contest in 2020 due to the COVID-19 pandemic
2022	Anakristina Rivero	Miss Grand Zaragoza 2021	2nd runner-up	
2023	Lara Gil Barranco	Miss Grand Zaragoza 2022	Unplaced	
2024	Leyre Escobedo	Miss Grand Zaragoza 2023	Unplaced	
2025	Did not compete			
2026	Ana Luisa	2nd runner-up Miss Grand Aragon 2026		
