= Clemente Gràcia =

Spanish Catalan footballer (1897–1981)

Grace
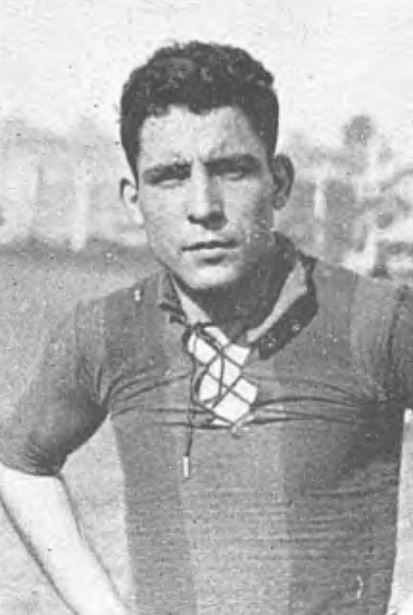

Personal information
- Full name: Josep Bosch-Clemente Gràcia
- Date of birth: 5 February 1897
- Place of birth: Barcelona, Spain
- Date of death: 6 March 1981 (aged 84)
- Place of death: Barcelona, Spain
- Position: Forward

Senior career*
Years	Team	Apps	(Gls)
1917–1919	Espanyol	19	(13)
1919–1924	Barcelona	23	(26)
1924	Terrassa	17	(7)
1926	Martinenc		

International career
1919–1923	Catalonia	5	(1)
- * Club domestic league appearances and goals

Bosch Josep-Clemente Gràcia (5 February 1897 – 6 March 1981), known as Grace, was a Spanish Catalan footballer who played as a forward and out as header during a career which lasted from 1917 to 1926. At his peak with FC Barcelona, he achieved the record of most goals scored by a player in a single season when he netted 59 goals in the 1921–22 season, which has remained unbroken until 2010, when it was finally broken by the great Lionel Messi.

== Club career ==
A native of Barcelona, Gràcia began his career at Terrassa FC. In the 1917–1918 season he was top scorer for RCD Espanyol, who undefeated won the Copa Catalunya. In 1919 with Ricardo Zamora, he left the club to join FC Barcelona. With Vicente Piera, Paulino Alcántara and Emili Sagi-Barba, he formed one of the best front considered Barcelona's history.

His best season was 1921–1922, where he won the Copa Catalunya and the Copa del Rey, scoring one of five goals for his team in the final against Real Unión. That season he was the team's top scorer with 59 goals (35 goals in friendly matches, 19 in the Championship of Catalonia and 5 in the Championship of Spain) in 50 games, a record that still stands.

He played for FC Barcelona for five years, and won five Copa Catalunya: 1919, 1920, 1921, 1922 and 1924, and two Copa del Rey (1920 and 1992). In total, he scored 161 goals in 151 games for Barcelona, scoring an average of more than one goal per game. After leaving Barcelona in 1924, he again played for Terrassa FC and then later for FC Martinenc. Professionally, it was official Guardia Urbana de Barcelona.

== International career ==
In 1920 Gràcia played several games with the Catalonia national football team, and participated in the 1922-23, which ended in a semi-final elimination to Galicia. Nonetheless, Grace still managed to score once in the tournament, in the quarter-finals against Biscay to help Catalonia to a 3–0 win.

== Death ==
Gràcia died in his native Barcelona at the age of 84.

== Career statistics ==
Appearances and goals by club, season and competition
Club	Season	Friendly			Cup		Regional championship		Totals		Ref.
Club	Season	Division	Apps	Goals	Apps	Goals	Apps	Goals	Apps	Goals	Ref.
Espanyol	1917–18	La Liga	0	0	3	3	10	9	13	12	
Espanyol	1918–19	La Liga	0	0	0	0	9	4	9	4	
Espanyol	Total		0	0	3	3	19	13	22	16	–
Barcelona	1919–20	La Liga		0	0	0	0	0	0	0	
Barcelona	1920–21	La Liga		30	0	0	4	1		31	
Barcelona	1921–22	La Liga		35	5	5	10	19		59	
Barcelona	1922–23	La Liga		54	0	0	9	6		60	
Barcelona	1923–24	La Liga		12	0	0	4	4		16	
Barcelona	Total			131	9	9	23	30		170	–
Terrassa	1924–25	La Liga	0	0	0	0	12	6	12	6	
Terrassa	1925–26	La Liga	0	0	0	0	5	1	5	1	
Terrassa	Total		0	0	0	0	17	7	17	7	–
Career total				131	12	12	59	58		201	–

== Honours ==
Barcelona

- Copa del Rey: 1920 and 1922
- Campeonato de Cataluña: 1919, 1920, 1921, 1922, 1924
