= Agustín Sancho =

Spanish footballer (1896–1960)

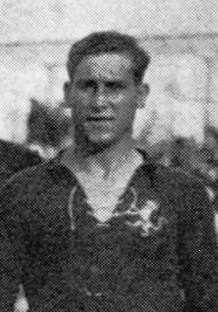
- Sancho with Spain at the 1920 Summer Olympics

Personal information
- Full name: Agustín Sancho Agustina
- Date of birth: 18 July 1896
- Place of birth: Benlloc, Valencia, Spain
- Date of death: 25 August 1960 (aged 64)
- Place of death: Barcelona, Spain
- Position: Midfielder

Senior career*
Years	Team	Apps	(Gls)
1911–1915	Gladiator de Sants		
1915–1916	CE Sants		
1916–1922	FC Barcelona	285	(203)
1922–1923	UE Sants		
1923–1928	FC Barcelona		
1928–1929	CE Sabadell		

International career
1920–1923	Spain	3	(0)
1921–1929	Catalonia		

Managerial career
- 1922: CE Castellón
- 1923: Valencia CF
Medal record
Men's football
Representing (Spain)
Olympic Games
Silver medal – second place	1920 Antwerp	Team competition
Catalonia
Prince of Asturias Cup
Gold medal – first place	1923–24 Prince of Asturias Cup	Team
- * Club domestic league appearances and goals

Agustín Sancho Agustina (18 July 1896 – 25 August 1960) was a Spanish professional footballer who played as a midfielder.

== Club career ==
Born in Benlloc (province of Castellon, Valencia), Sancho moved to Sants in Barcelona as a child, and there he played for various clubs in the neighborhood such as Gladiator de Sants, who was later effectively relaunched as the CE Sants. His good performance with Sants aroused the interest of the main Barcelona clubs and, although he had a pre-agreement with RCD Espanyol, he joined Barcelona in 1916, for whom he played in the next 12 seasons (Sept 1922–23, because he returned to Sants to defend the newly founded UE Sants). He was a member of the legendary FC Barcelona team, coached by Jack Greenwell, that also included Paulino Alcántara, Sagibarba, Ricardo Zamora and Josep Samitier, and together with them, he helped Barcelona to win 9 Catalan championships and four Copa del Rey titles in 1920, 1922, 1925 and 1926. In the 1925 final, Sancho scored Barça's second goal of the night in a 2–0 win over Arenas Club de Getxo.

Annoyed after receiving criticism, especially for his overweight, Sancho asked to leave Barcelona in June 1922, returning to his origins, Sants, where he signed for UE Sants, a new-born club from the merger of FC Internacional and his former club, Unió Esportiva Sants. The Sansense club also offered him a job as a construction contractor for the City Council of Barcelona, because throughout his career, Sancho had combined football with his work as a bricklayer, since professionalism was not recognized in Spain until the end of the 1920s. Sancho spent only a season at Sants as the leaders of FC Barcelona convinced him to rejoin Barça in June 1923.

== International career ==
Sancho appeared in the Spain national team for the 1920 Summer Olympics, featuring in two matches against Belgium and Italy; Spain won the silver medal. He earned a third and last cap on 16 December 1923 in a friendly against Portugal.

As a Barcelona player, he was summoned to play for the Catalonia national team, being a member of the team that won the 1923–24 Prince of Asturias Cup, an inter-regional competition organized by the RFEF. Sancho was a starter in both games of the infamous final against a Castile/Madrid XI, helping Catalonia to a 3–2 win in the replay to assure the team's second title of the competition.

== Managerial career ==
In the summer of 1922, Sancho was on holiday in Castellón at the same time as the local football team was being founded: CE Castellón. Since he was the most experienced and representative footballer in the province, he was offered to lead the first matches of the newly founded. In the following year, he also led some matches in Valencia. Once retired from football, he was José Planas assistant in the technical management of FC Barcelona.

== Honours ==
Barcelona

- Copa del Rey: 1920, 1922, 1925, 1926
- Catalan Championship (9): 1918–19, 1919–20, 1920–21, 1921–22, 1923–24, 1924–25, 1925–26, 1926–27, 1927–28

Spain

- Olympic Games silver medallist: 1920
