= Ana María Martínez Sagi =

Catalan poet, journalist, feminist and athlete (1907–2000)

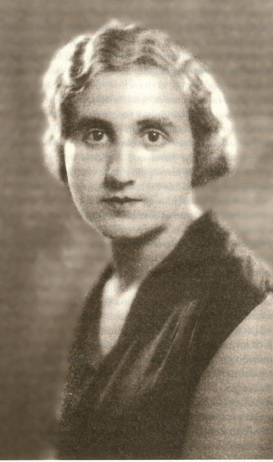

Anna Maria Martínez Sagi (16 February 1907 – 2 January 2000) was a Spanish poet, trade unionist, journalist, feminist and athlete. She was the national champion in the javelin and became the first female director of a Spanish football club. During the Spanish Civil War, she followed the Durruti Column as a journalist and was then exiled to France, living in different places. During World War II, she joined the French Resistance and evaded capture by the Gestapo. Afterwards, she worked for the Aga Khan and then moved to the United States, where she taught at the University of Illinois. After the death of Francisco Franco, she returned to Catalonia, where she lived in obscurity near Barcelona.

== Early life ==
Martínez Sagi was born into a genteel family in Barcelona, Catalonia, in 1907. Her father worked in textiles, and her mother encouraged her children to speak in Spanish and English, but not Catalan. Martínez Sagi learned Catalan, the language she would later write in, from her nanny.

== Career ==
A sports enthusiast, Martinez Sagi was a national champion in javelin. Her brother, Armand Martínez Sagi (1919–1923), and cousin, Emilio Sagi Liñán, played for FC Barcelona, and in 1934, she became a Director of FC Barcelona, the first woman to do so in Spanish football's history.

Together with Josefina Carabias, Martínez Sagi became a key journalist in Republican Spain. She interviewed various people, including beggars, prostitutes, and Catalan politicians. Martínez Sagi's articles focused especially on women's suffrage, a controversial issue at the time. She joined the Durruti Column as a journalist during the Spanish Civil War, after hearing the anarchist Buenaventura Durruti talk at the Palau Reial de Pedralbes. In addition to journalistic work, she also published several books of poetry. Her desperate and distressed style was similar to that of the Latin American poets Juana de Ibarbourou, Alfonsina Storni, and Gabriela Mistral. After her first book of poetry, Caminos, was published in 1930, Alberto Insúa compared Martínez Sagi to Rosalía de Castro. As a feminist, Martínez Sagi espoused ideas which came from France. She founded the first club of women workers of Barcelona, which worked to improve literacy among women.

In 1932, she fell in love with writer Elisabeth Mulder, but her feelings were not reciprocated, and Martínez Sagi's family separated them.

After the end of the civil war, Martínez Sagi was exiled to France, where she lived in Paris and then Chartres. When World War II broke out, she participated in the French Resistance and in 1942 was nearly captured by the Gestapo when they raided her apartment, and she left through a window. Selling handkerchiefs on the streets of Cannes she met the wife of the Aga Khan and worked for her as an interior designer, before moving to Provence. In 1950, she moved to the US, and, having a degree in French Language and Literature, she was able to teach at the University of Illinois.

She returned to Catalonia in 1975, after the death of Francisco Franco, moving to Moià near Barcelona. She retired to private life in which her neighbours knew nothing about her past and regarded her as a stern old lady. The novelist Juan Manuel de Prada tracked her down and interviewed her. Martínez Sagi's writings were posthumously published in La voz sola (2019).

She died in 2000.

== Selected works ==
- Caminos
- Laberinto de presencias: antología poética
- Inquietud
- La voz sola
