= Miguel Peidró =

Spanish footballer

Personal information
- Full name: Miguel Peidró Barcos
- Date of birth: Unknown
- Place of birth: Catalonia, Spain
- Date of death: Unknown
- Position: Forward

Senior career*
Years	Team	Apps	(Gls)
1921	UE Sants		
1921–1922	FC Espanya		
1922	CE Europa (on loan)		
1922–1923	Espanyol		
1923–1925	FC Gràcia		
1924	FC Barcelona (on loan)		
1925–1926	UE Sants		
1926–1927	FC Gràcia		
1927–1928	CE Europa		
1928–1929	FC Lleida		
1929–1931	Alumnes Obrers de Vilanova		
1931–1932	UE Sants		

International career
1924-31	Catalonia	3	(3)
Medal record
Catalonia
Prince of Asturias Cup
Gold medal – first place	1923-24 Prince of Asturias Cup	Team
- * Club domestic league appearances and goals

Miguel Peidró Barcos was a Spanish footballer who played as a forward. The dates of his birth and death are unknown.

== Club career ==
Throughout his career, he was part of numerous teams based in Catalonia, going from Espanyol to CE Europa, and from two spells at UE Sants to three spells at FC Espanya (in the latter two the club was now under the name of FC Gràcia), and at the end of his career, he played for FC Lleida and Alumnes Obrers de Vilanova (Vilanova Workers' Students Association). As a member of this club, he was suspended for six months for allegedly assaulting a referee in 1930. He also played four friendly matches with FC Barcelona during the spring of 1924, scoring 2 goals.

== International career ==
He represented the Catalonia national team 3 times, one of which being in the replay of the infamous final of the 1923-24 Prince of Asturias Cup, replacing Juan Feliu to help Catalonia beat a Castille/Madrid XI 3-2.

== Honours ==
=== International ===
Catalonia

Prince of Asturias Cup:

- Champions (1): 1923-24
