= 1920–21 FC Barcelona season =

22nd season in existence of FC Barcelona

FC Barcelona
1920–21 season
- President: Gaspar Rosés
- Manager: Jack Greenwell
- Campionat de Catalunya: First
- Campionat d'Espanya: Retired before starting

The 1920–21 season was the 22nd season for FC Barcelona.

== Results ==
Friendly

12 September 1920	FC Barcelona	1 - 1	Unió Esportiva Sant Andreu	Barcelona
	Julià			Stadium: Camp del carrer Indústria; Referee: Peris

24 September 1920	FC Barcelona	4 - 0	Real Vigo Sporting Club	Barcelona
	Sesumaga; Gracia			Stadium: Camp del carrer Indústria; Referee: Comorera

26 September 1920	FC Barcelona	4 - 0	Real Vigo Sporting Club	Barcelona
	Sesumaga; Julia; Martinez			Stadium: Camp del carrer Indústria; Referee: Peris

3 October 1920	Unió Esportiva Sant Andreu	2 - 3	FC Barcelona	Barcelona
			Galicia; Gracia; Cadellans	Stadium: Avenc; Referee: Marine

31 October 1920	FC Barcelona	3 - 0	Athletic Club	Barcelona
	Sesumaga; Gracia			Stadium: Industria; Referee: Cruella

1 November 1920	FC Barcelona	1 - 1	Athletic Club	Barcelona
	Julia			Stadium: Industria; Referee: Marine

7 November 1920	FC Barcelona	1 - 1	CF Badalona	Barcelona
	Vinyals			Stadium: Industria; Referee: Torras

5 December 1920	Athletic Club	2 - 2	FC Barcelona	Bilbao
			Julia; Sancho	Stadium: San Mames; Referee: Coterillo

6 December 1920	FC Barcelona	2 - 0	UE Sants	Barcelona
	Martinez; Sagi			Stadium: Industria; Referee: Reguera

8 December 1920	Athletic Club	3 - 2	FC Barcelona	Bilbao
			Martinez; Gracia	Stadium: San Mames; Referee: Arzuaga

9 December 1920	FC Barcelona	2 - 1	CE Júpiter	Barcelona
	Sabate; Alcantara			Stadium: Industria; Referee: Ferre Elias

25 December 1920	FC Barcelona	3 - 0	Sporting de Gijón	Barcelona
	Gracia; Vinyals			Stadium: Industria; Referee: Vela

26 December 1920	FC Barcelona	2 - 1	Sporting de Gijón	Barcelona
	Gracia; Alcantara			Stadium: Industria; Referee: Llobera

1 January 1921	FC Barcelona	3 - 1	Arenas Club de Getxo	Barcelona
	Sancho; Piera			Stadium: Industria; Referee: Peris

2 January 1921	FC Barcelona	5 - 2	Arenas Club de Getxo	Barcelona
	Gracia; Martinez			Stadium: Industria; Referee: Marine

6 January 1921	FC Barcelona	2 - 2	FC Biel-Bienne	Barcelona
	Piera; Blanco			Stadium: Industria; Referee: Comorera

11 January 1921	FC Barcelona	3 - 0	FC Madrid	Barcelona
	Piera; Gracia			Stadium: Industria; Referee: Peris

2 February 1921	FC Barcelona	2 - 2	FC Espanya	Barcelona
	Gracia			Stadium: Industria; Referee: Reguera

13 February 1921	FC Barcelona	7 - 2	Terrassa FC	Barcelona
	Alcantara; Martinez; Torralba; Sancho; Gracia			Stadium: Industria; Referee: Vela

20 February 1921	FC Barcelona	4 - 1	Sevilla FC	Barcelona
	Martinez; Martinez Sagi; Sancho; Gracia			Stadium: Industria; Referee: Vela

26 February 1921	FC Barcelona	0 - 0	Sevilla FC	Barcelona
				Stadium: Industria; Referee: Vela

27 February 1921	FC Barcelona	1 - 0	Sevilla FC	Barcelona
	Martinez			Stadium: Industria; Referee: Torras

27 March 1921	FC Barcelona	5 - 1	Crook Town A.F.C.	Barcelona
	Alcantara; Gracia; Plaza			Stadium: Industria; Referee: Vela

29 March 1921	FC Barcelona	4 - 1	Crook Town A.F.C.	Barcelona
	Argemi; Gracia			Stadium: Industria; Referee: Torras

2 April 1921	FC Barcelona	2 - 1	Crook Town A.F.C.	Barcelona
	Alcantara			Stadium: Industria; Referee: Vela

3 April 1921	FC Barcelona	1 - 1	Crook Town A.F.C.	Barcelona
	Martinez			Stadium: Industria; Referee: Vela

7 April 1921	FC Barcelona	2 - 1	Civil Service F.C.	Barcelona
	Gracia			Stadium: Industria; Referee: Torras

10 April 1921	FC Barcelona	0 - 3	Civil Service F.C.	Barcelona
				Stadium: Industria; Referee: Prats

1 May 1921	FC Barcelona	4 - 0	Cardiff Corinthians F.C.	Barcelona
	Alcantara; Martinez; Gracia			Stadium: Industria; Referee: Ferre Elias

5 May 1921	FC Barcelona	2 - 1	Cardiff Corinthians F.C.	Barcelona
	Gracia			Stadium: Industria; Referee: Comorera

15 May 1921	FC Barcelona	1 - 1	Association Sportive Marine d'Oran	Oran
				Stadium: Marine; Referee: Julia

16 May 1921	FC Barcelona	2 - 1	Sélection d'Oranie	Oran
				Stadium: Marine; Referee: Julia

15 May 1921	FC Barcelona	2 - 0	Cardiff Corinthians F.C.	Barcelona
	Argemi; Samitier			Stadium: Industria; Referee: Nandon

26 May 1921	CE Europa	1 - 3	FC Barcelona	Barcelona
			Vinyals; Piera	Stadium: Europa; Referee: Sabata

29 May 1921	FC Barcelona	6 - 1	Terrassa FC	Barcelona
	Martinez; Gracia; Sancho; Piera			Stadium: Industria; Referee: Ferre Elias

? June 1921	FC Barcelona	2 - 0	FC Santboià	Barcelona
	Gracia; Plaza			Stadium: Industria; Referee: Vinyals

15 June 1921	FC Barcelona	2 - 3	Newcastle United	Barcelona
	Gracia; Argemi			Stadium: Espanya; Referee: Torras

16 June 1921	FC Barcelona	3 - 2	Newcastle United	Barcelona
	Vinyals; Alcantara			Stadium: Espanya; Referee: Vela

? June 1921	AD Guíxols	1 - 1	FC Barcelona	Barcelona
			Ceferí Cella II	Stadium: Sant Feliu de Guíxols; Referee: Julia

? June 1921	CF Calella	0 - 6	FC Barcelona	Barcelona
				Stadium: Calella

? July 1921	Terrassa FC	2 - 2	FC Barcelona	Barcelona
			Piera; Martinez	Stadium: Terrassa

? July 1921	Premianenc FC	0 - 3	FC Barcelona	Barcelona
			Comamala; Gracia; Torralba	Stadium: Premià de Mar; Referee: Badia

24 July 1921	C.F. Caldes	1 - 4	FC Barcelona	Barcelona
				Stadium: Caldes de Montbui; Referee: Valls

25 July 1921	C.F. Caldes	2 - 4	FC Barcelona	Barcelona
				Stadium: Caldes de Montbui; Referee: Torras

28 July 1921	Iluro SC	2 - 4	FC Barcelona	Barcelona
				Stadium: Mataró

? August 1921	Atlètic de Sabadell	3 - 3	FC Barcelona	Barcelona
				Stadium: Sabadell

25 August 1921	Terrassa FC	0 - 2	FC Barcelona	Barcelona
			Ceferí Cella II	Stadium: Terrassa; Referee: Calatayub

? August 1921	FC Barcelona	1 - 0	CE Europa	Barcelona
	Ceferí Cella II			Stadium: Sant Just Desvern; Referee: Calatayub

Campionat de Catalunya

10 October 1920 Jornada 1	FC Barcelona	4 - 2	CS Sabadell	Barcelona
	Sancho; Julià; Martínez		Balart; Mateu	Stadium: Camp del carrer Indústria; Referee: Mariné

17 October 1920 Jornada 2	FC Barcelona	2 - 0	RCD Español	Barcelona
	Vinyals; Julià			Stadium: Camp del carrer Indústria; Referee: Cruella

24 October 1920 Jornada 3	CE Europa	1 - 1	FC Barcelona	Barcelona
	Goal		Martínez	Referee: Mariné

14 November 1920 Jornada 4	FC Internacional	2 - 2	FC Barcelona	Barcelona
	Sanahuja; Millán		Sesúmaga; Samitier	Stadium: Camp del carrer Galileu; Referee: Sanpere

21 November 1920 Jornada 5	FC Espanya	0 - 2	FC Barcelona	Barcelona
			Vinyals; Alcántara	Stadium: Camp del carrer Entença / València; Referee: Lemmel

28 November 1920 Jornada 6	CS Sabadell	1 - 1	FC Barcelona	Sabadell
	Cabedo		Alcántara	Stadium: Camp de la Creu Alta; Referee: Pelao

12 December 1920 Jornada 7	RCD Español	1 - 2	FC Barcelona	Barcelona
14:40	Mallorquí		Alcántara	Stadium: Velòdrom Parc d'Sports; Referee: Torrens

16 January 1921 Jornada 8	FC Barcelona	2 - 1	CE Europa	Barcelona
	Alcántara; Gràcia		Goal	Stadium: Camp del carrer Indústria; Referee: Lemmel

23 January 1921 Jornada 9	FC Barcelona	1 - 0	FC Internacional	Barcelona
	Alcántara			Stadium: Camp del carrer Indústria; Referee: Massana

30 January 1921 Jornada 10	FC Barcelona	0 - 2	FC Espanya	Barcelona
			Balaciart; Roca	Stadium: Camp del carrer Indústria; Referee: Ollé

6 March 1921 Finale - first leg	FC Barcelona	3 - 1	Avenç de l'Sport	Barcelona
	Martínez Sagi; Plaza		Planas	Referee: Massana

13 March 1921 Finale - second leg	Avenç de l'Sport	1 - 0	FC Barcelona	Barcelona
	Planas			Stadium: Velòdrom Parc d'Sports; Referee: Segarra

20 March 1921 Finale - tiebreaker	FC Barcelona	4 - 1	Avenç de l'Sport	Barcelona
	Martínez; Gràcia; Alcántara		Planas	Stadium: Camp del carrer Entença / València; Referee: Prats
