= Cándido Martínez =

Spanish footballer

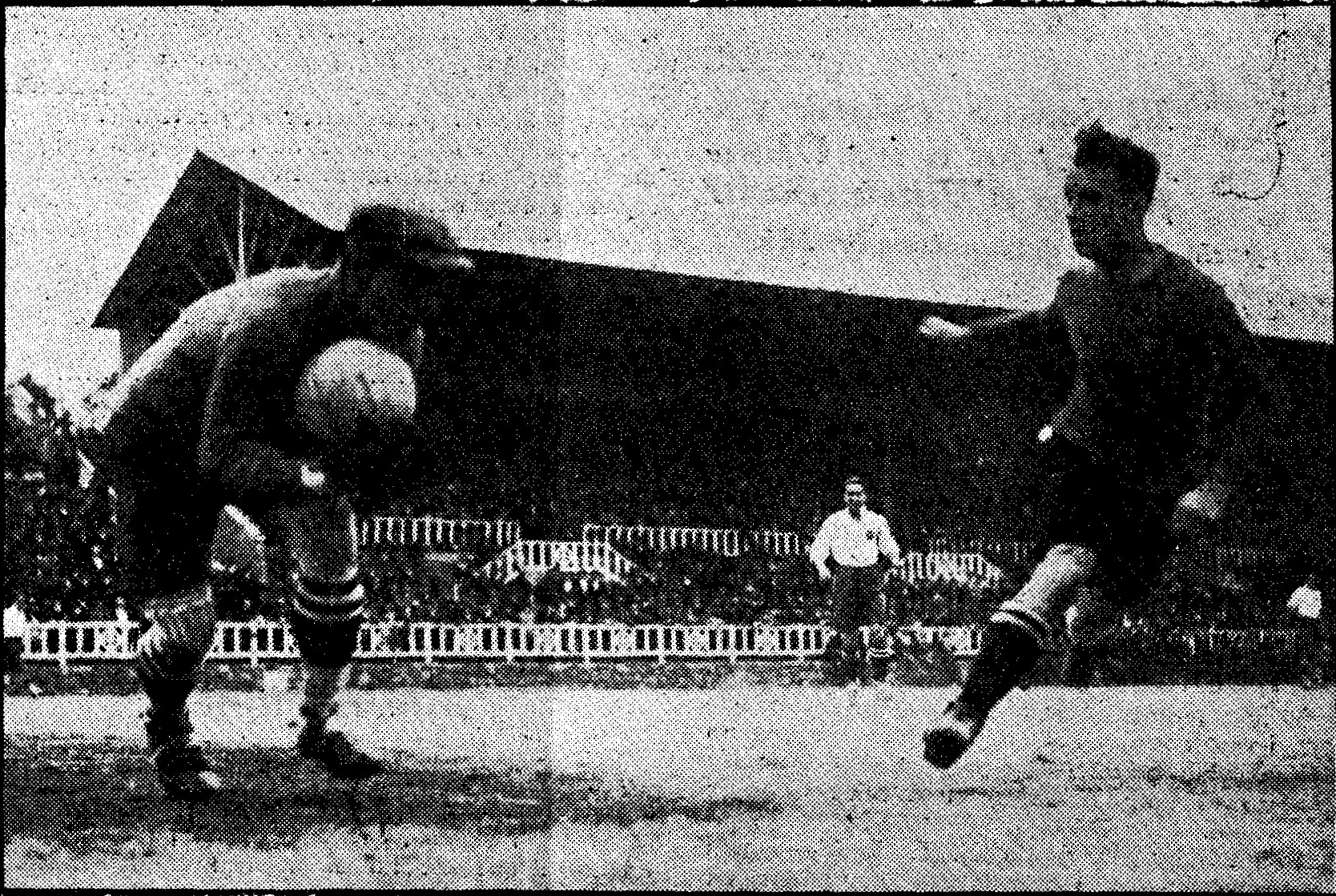
- Martínez saving from Samitier in an El Clásico in 1926

Personal information
- Full name: Cándido Martínez Collar
- Date of birth: 1 September 1899
- Place of birth: Madrid, Spain
- Date of death: 16 June 1960 (aged 60)
- Place of death: Spain
- Position: Goalkeeper

Senior career*
Years	Team	Apps	(Gls)
1921–1928	Real Madrid		
1928–1929	Atlético Madrid		

International career
1923–1924	Madrid	+3	(0)
Medal record
Madrid
Prince of Asturias Cup
Silver medal – second place	1923–24 Prince of Asturias Cup	Team
- * Club domestic league appearances and goals

Cándido Martínez Collar (1 September 1899 – 16 June 1960) was a Spanish footballer who played as a goalkeeper for Real Madrid and Atlético Madrid. He was one of the great goalkeepers of Real Madrid's early history, playing with them for seven years.

== Club career ==
Born in Madrid, he joined the ranks of his hometown club Real Madrid in 1920, playing for one year as a substitute. Cándido began to appear as Real Madrid's starting goalkeeper in 1921 at the hand of coach Juan de Cárcer, taking over from Hernández Coronado, after the latter had a bad 1920–21 season in which Real failed to win a single trophy. He quickly become an undisputed starter, forming a great defensive partnership with Félix Quesada and Pedro Escobal, and together with them, Cándido helped the club to win six regional championships (1921–22, 1922–23, 1923–24, 1925–26, 1926–27 and 1927–28). Cándido played a pivotal role in helped the club reach the 1924 Copa del Rey Final, which was Real's first Copa del Rey final in 7 years, losing 0–1 to Real Unión, courtesy of a goal from José Echeveste.

In the summer of 1925 he went out on a tour in England, Denmark, and France with Real Madrid, and on his return to Madrid, Cándido spoke wonders about the European public and the great influx in the stadiums. On numerous occasions Cándido played for other Spanish clubs as a guest in friendlies against foreign teams, such as when, in August 1925, Cándido played for Deportivo de La Coruña against Nacional de Montevideo of Uruguay, in a match which was basically a heroic fight between the A Coruña defense and the Uruguayan forward line, and such was Cándido's performance and the enthusiasm that he aroused among the fans that at the end of the match he was carried out on their shoulders. However, he remained loyal to Real Madrid until 1928, when the club's board of directors decided that the poor performances of an aging Cándido did not allow him to continue defending Madrid's goal, and so, he ended up in the neighboring club, Atlético Madrid, with whom he played for one year before retiring at the end of the 1928–29 season.

== International career ==
Like many other Real Madrid players of that time, he was summoned to play for the 'Centro' (Madrid area) representative team, and he was part of the Madrid side that reached the final of the 1923–24 Prince of Asturias Cup, an inter-regional competition organized by the RFEF. Cándido started in the infamous final against Catalonia where he conceded 4 goals in a 4–4 draw, and in the replay in the following day, he again conceded 3 goals as his side lost 2–3.

== Honours ==
=== Club ===
Real Madrid

- Campeonato Regional Centro:
  - Champions (6): 1921–22, 1922–23, 1923–24, 1925–26, 1926–27 and 1927–28
- Copa del Rey:
  - Runner-up (1): 1924

=== International ===
Madrid

- Prince of Asturias Cup:
  - Runner-up (1): 1923–24
