= Patricio Caicedo =

Spanish footballer and manager (1899–1981)

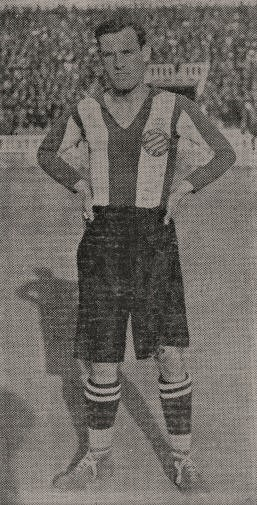

Personal information
- Full name: Patricio Caicedo Liciaga
- Date of birth: 6 February 1899
- Place of birth: Bilbao, Spain
- Place of death: 8 September 1981 (aged 82)
- Position: Midfielder

Managerial career
- Years: Team
- 1930–1933: Espanyol
- 1933–1935: Athletic Bilbao
- 1935–1943: Espanyol
- 1943–1945: Zaragoza
- 1945–1947: Mallorca
- 1947: Real Murcia
- 1947–1948: Sevilla
- 1949–1950: Espanyol
- 1950–1951: Real Oviedo
- 1952–1953: Las Palmas
- 1954–1955: Hércules
- 1957–1958: Girona

Patricio Caicedo Liciaga (6 February 1899 – 8 September 1981) was a Spanish football player and manager.

== Career ==
Born in Bilbao, Caicedo played as a midfielder.

He managed Espanyol, Athletic Bilbao, Zaragoza, Mallorca, Real Murcia, Sevilla, Real Oviedo, Las Palmas, Hércules and Girona.
