= Patricio Arabolaza =

Spanish footballer

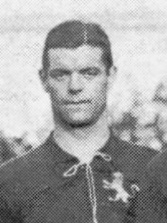
- Patricio Arabolaza in 1920

Personal information
- Full name: Patricio Arabolaza Aranburu
- Date of birth: 17 March 1893
- Place of birth: Irún, Spain
- Date of death: 10 March 1935 (aged 41)
- Place of death: Irun, Gipuzkoa
- Position: Forward

Senior career*
Years	Team	Apps	(Gls)
1909–1914	Racing de Irún		
1915–1923	Real Unión		

International career
1914–1915	Gipuzkoa		
1915–1922	Basque Country		
1920–1921	Spain	5	(1)
Medal record
Men's football
Basque Country
Prince of Asturias Cup
Gold medal – first place	1915 Prince of Asturias Cup	Team
Representing Spain
Olympic Games
Silver medal – second place	1920 Antwerp	Team Competition
- * Club domestic league appearances and goals

Patricio Arabolaza Aranburu (17 March 1893 – 10 March 1935) was a Spanish football player who competed in the 1920 Summer Olympics. He is best known for scoring the first goal in the history of the Spain national team.

== Club career ==
Born in Irun, Gipuzkoa, Patricio began playing football with hometown club Racing de Irún in 1909, helping the club win the 1913 Copa del Rey Final by scoring a goal in a 2-2 draw against Athletic Bilbao, eventually winning the replay 1-0 in the following day.

In 1915, Racing de Irún merged with Sporting de Irún to form Real Unión Club de Irún and along with other Racing players, Patricio joined this newly-created club that would become one of the dominant teams in Basque and Spain during the following decade, with Patricio being the star of the team during the first half of that decade. As well as winning four regional championships with Real Unión, Patricio reached the 1918 and 1922 Copa del Rey finals with his club. In the 1918 final, Real Unión won the Cup after beating Madrid FC 2-0, but in the 1922 final, they lost to Barcelona 1–5; in a game in which Patricio scored Unión's consolation goal and was involved in a monumental brawl with the Barcelona player Surroca. The incidents of that game led to the suspension of Patricio for one year and a fine of 500 pesetas for Real Unión, which at the time was a heavy fine. The one-year suspension effectively led to the retirement of Patricio, who was almost 30 years old and had been playing football since he was 17. He retired in 1923 in a friendly match that was played at the Atotxa Stadium in San Sebastián.

== International career ==
Being a Real Unión player, he was eligible to play for the Gipuzkoa national team, being in the line-up of the team's first-ever international match on 13 December 1914 against Biscay, held at San Mamés, and although they lost 2-1, Patricio scored the consolation goal, thus being the author of the first goal in the history of the team. In May of 1915, he was a member of the team that won the first edition of the Prince of Asturias Cup, an inter-regional competition organized by the RFEF. In the decisive game against a Castile/Madrid XI, he scored the opening goal in an eventual 1-1 draw that was enough for the Basques to win the cup for the first (and only) time in their history.

He also represented Spain in the nation's international debut at the 1920 Summer Olympics, and he scored Spain's first-ever goal in international football in a 1–0 victory over Denmark on 28 August 1920. He was a member of Spain's team that won the silver medal at the 1920 Summer Olympics, playing in four of the five matches.

Arabolaza died in March 1935 in his hometown of a rapid illness that unexpectedly ended his life a few days before his 42nd birthday. He was to participate in a tribute match to his former teammate in Real Unión Joaquín Vázquez at the end of that same month.

== Honours ==
=== Club ===
Real Unión

- North Regional Championship:
  - Winners (1) 1917–18
- Gipuzkoa Championship:
  - Winners (3) 1919–20, 1920–21, 1921–22
- Copa del Rey:
  - Winners (2) 1913 (Note: As Racing de Irún) and 1918
  - Runners-up (1): 1922

=== International ===
Spain

- Summer Olympics:
  - Silver medal (1): 1920

Basque Country

- Prince of Asturias Cup:
  - Champions (1) 1915
