= Joaquín Montané =

Spanish footballer (1901–1982)

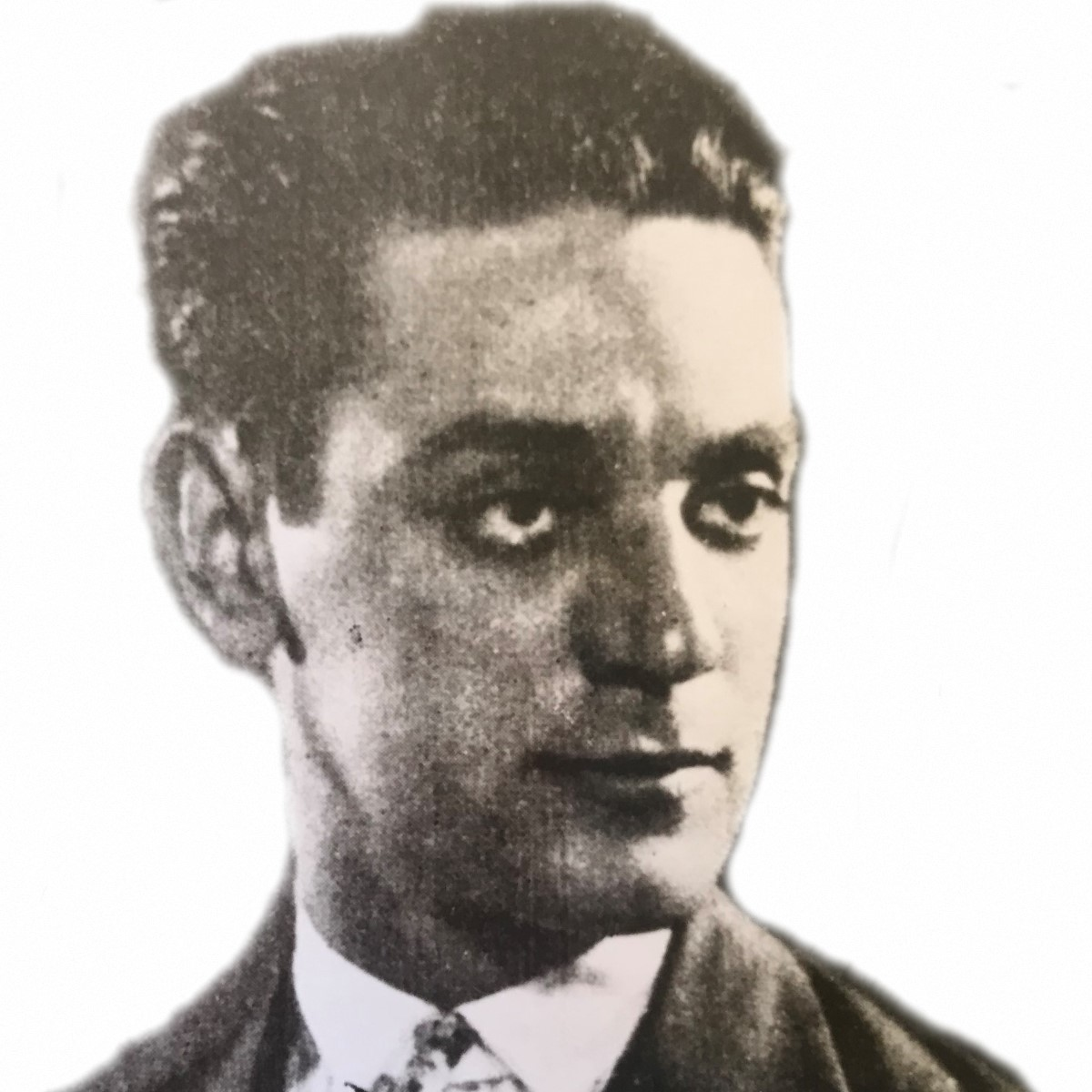

Personal information
- Full name: Joaquín Montané Martí
- Birth name: Joaquim Montané i Martí
- Date of birth: 1 June 1901
- Place of birth: Sabadell, Catalonia, Kingdom of Spain
- Date of death: 3 March 1982 (aged 80)
- Place of death: Sabadell, Catalonia, Spain
- Position: Defender

Youth career
- Escolapis Sabadell
- CE Sabadell

Senior career*
Years	Team	Apps	(Gls)
1921–1926	CE Sabadell		
1926–1928	FC Barcelona		

International career
1924–1932	Catalonia	8	(0)
Medal record
Catalonia
Prince of Asturias Cup
Silver medal – second place	1923–24 Prince of Asturias Cup	Team
- * Club domestic league appearances and goals

Joaquín Montané Martí (born Joaquim Montané i Martí; 1 June 1901 – 3 March 1982) was a Spanish footballer who played as a defender for FC Barcelona.

== Club career ==
Born in Sabadell, he began playing football with Pares Escolapis, the football team of his hometown school, and later he joined CE Sabadell, where together with men like Antonio Estruch or Tena I, he was part of a team that called itself the Tenórios. He debuted with the first team in 1921, and remained there until 1926. His constant series of solid defensive performances eventually earned him a move to FC Barcelona in 1926, for whom he played for two seasons, in which he won championships of Catalonia. In a time where defenders were known for tough and terrifying tackles, Montané was known to use his ability to steal balls from the opponents.

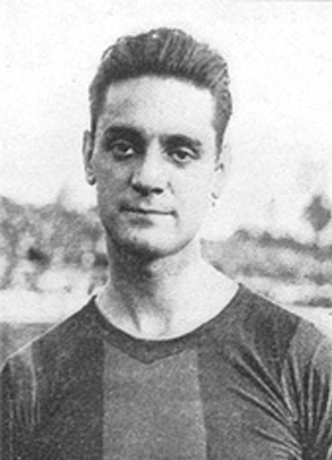
Montané with FC Barcelona

Back then, it was impossible to live exclusively out of football, so Montané worked in a factory, which together with injuries caused him to leave football in 1928 when he was only 27 years of age.

== International career ==
Like many other Catalan players of his time, he was eligible to play for the Catalonia national team, for which he was a regular starter, playing 8 games between 1924 and 1927, forming defensive partnerships with the likes of Domingo Massagué, Ricardo Saprissa or Pedro Serra. He helped the Catalan team win the 1923–24 Prince of Asturias Cup, an inter-regional competition organized by the RFEF. Montané was a starter in the replay of the infamous final of the 1923–24 edition against a Castile/Madrid XI, where Catalonia came out as 3–2 winners.

== Honours ==
=== Club ===
Barcelona

- Catalan Championship: 1926–27 and 1927–28

=== International ===
Catalonia

- Prince of Asturias Cup: 1923–24
