= Ramón Torralba =

Spanish footballer

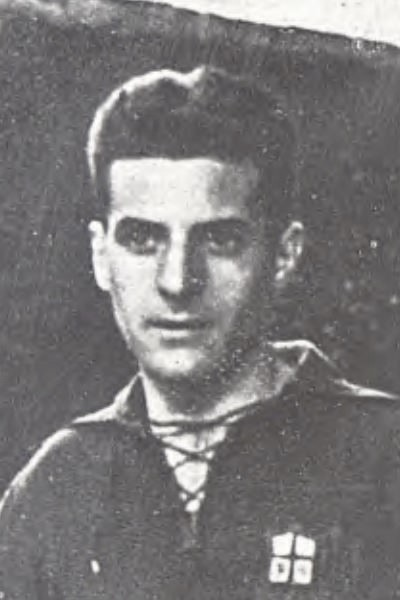
- Catalunya Gràfica, 1922

Personal information
- Full name: Ramón Torralba Larraz
- Date of birth: 13 August 1895
- Place of birth: Ardisa, Aragon, Spain
- Date of death: 6 June 1986 (aged 90)
- Place of death: León, México
- Position: Midfielder

Senior career*
Years	Team	Apps	(Gls)
1912–1914	FC International		
1914–1928	FC Barcelona		

International career
1913–1924	Catalonia		
Medal record
Catalonia
1923-24 Prince of Asturias Cup
Gold medal – first place	1926 Prince of Asturias Cup	Team
- * Club domestic league appearances and goals

Ramon Torralba Larraz (13 August 1895 – 6 June 1986) is a famous figure in the history of FC Barcelona. He was popularly known as la Vella ('the Old One') because of his long career with Barça.

== Club career ==
Despite being born in Aragon, he moved to Catalonia at just six months old, and there he began playing football at FC International in 1912, before joining Barcelona two years later, with whom he played for the next 15 seasons, earning the nickname 'la Vella' (the Old One).

He played as a holding midfield and was known for his strength and sacrifices. He formed a partnership with Agustín Sancho and Josep Samitier on the midfield. He was a regular in the starting line-ups from the 1914/15 season until the 1925/26 season. With Barcelona he won 10 Catalan championships, along with four Copa del Rey titles in 1920, 1922, 1925 and 1926, with Torralba scoring the opening goal in the 1922 final which ended in a 5-1 win over Real Unión.

On 4 February 1917, he became the first player in the history of Barcelona to be granted a testimonial match, which took place at the Camp de la Indústria when he was still an active player. He retired on 1 July 1928, at the Camp de Les Corts, after a second tribute match.

== Honours ==
=== Club ===
Barcelona

Catalan football championship:

- Champions (10): 1915-16, 1918-19, 1919-20, 1920-21, 1921-22, 1923–24, 1924–25, 1925–26, 1926–27 and in 1927–28

Copa del Rey:

- Champions (4): 1920, 1922, 1925 and 1926
