= Delicias (Zaragoza) =

Coordinates: 41.6491°N 0.9094°W

- City district
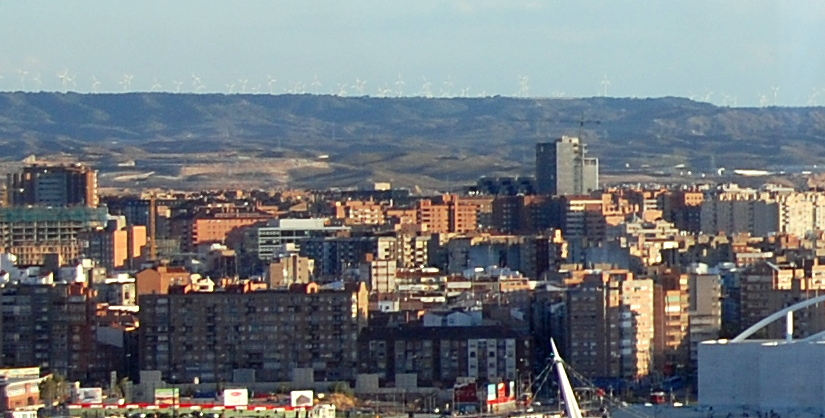

- Delicias in Zaragoza
- Country: Spain
- Region: Aragon
- Municipality: Zaragoza

Area
  - Total: 3.284606 km^{2} (1.268193 sq mi)

Population (2020)
  - Total: 104,389
  - Density: 31,781.3/km^{2} (82,313.2/sq mi)

Delicias is an urban district of Zaragoza, Spain. It is the most populated district in the municipality.

It has an area of 3.2846 km^{2} (1.2682 sq mi) and, as of 2020, a population of 104,389 inhabitants. An extremely densely populated working class district, Delicias welcomed in the second half of the 20th century rural migrants from Spain and, in the 21st century, foreign migrants (about a 25% of the population has foreign citizenship). The process of urbanization was somewhat chaotic, with narrow streets.

It is further subdivided into the neighborhoods of La Bombarda, La Bozada, Ciudad Jardín, Delicias, Monsalud, and Parque Roma.
