= Adolphe Mengotti =

Swiss footballer (1901-1984)

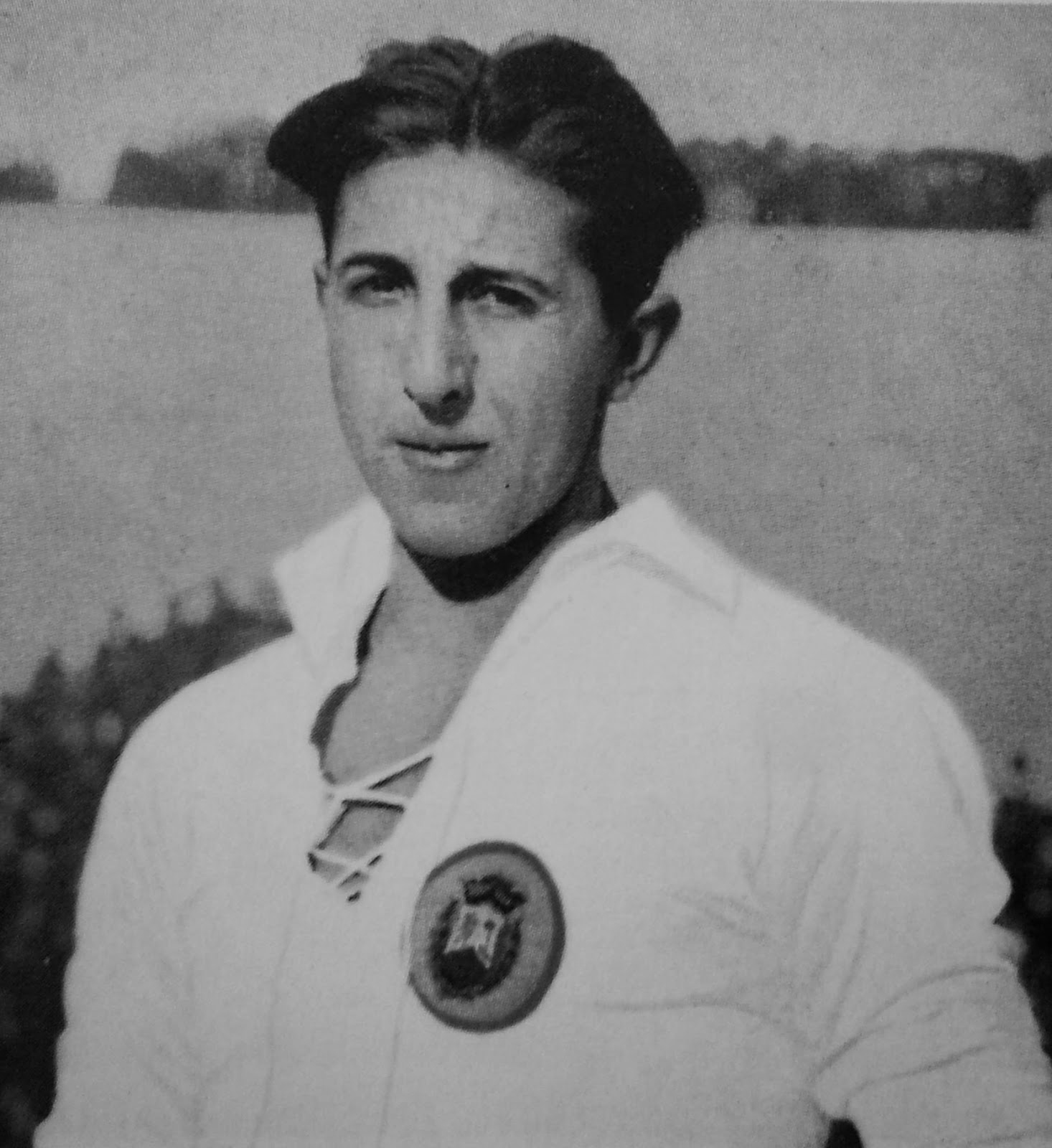

Personal information
- Born: 12 November 1901 Valladolid, Spain
- Died: 1984 (aged 82–83)
Medal record
Men's Football
Olympic Games
Silver medal – second place	1924 Paris	Team competition

Adolphe Mengotti (born 12 November 1901, in Valladolid, Spain - 1984) was a Swiss football (soccer) player who competed in the 1924 Summer Olympics. He played for Servette FC and Real Madrid. He was a member of the Swiss Olympic team, which won the silver medal in the football tournament.
