= Patricio Escobal =

Spanish footballer

Personal information
- Full name: Patricio Pedro Escobal López
- Date of birth: 24 August 1903
- Place of birth: Logroño, Spain
- Date of death: 25 November 2002 (aged 99)
- Place of death: New York City, United States
- Position: Defender

Senior career*
Years	Team	Apps	(Gls)
1921–1928	Real Madrid		
1928–1930	Racing de Madrid		
1930	CD Nacional de Madrid		
1930–1931	Real Madrid		
1933–1934	CD Logroño		

International career
1924	Spain	0	(0)
- * Club domestic league appearances and goals

Patricio Pedro Escobal López (24 August 1903 – 25 November 2002), better known as Perico Escobal, was a Spanish footballer who played as a defender for Real Madrid and Racing de Madrid. With the former, he played 82 official matches and won six regional championships. He was also a member of the Spanish football squad that competed in the 1924 Summer Olympics, but he did not play in any matches.

== Early life ==
Patricio Escobal was born on 24 August 1903 in Logroño to a Biscayan father from Galdames and a La Rioja mother from Nalda. He grew up among books and balls dreaming of one day being an engineer in the metropolitan area. He began his studies in his native Logroño, where he attended the first two years of high school, but then he moved to the capital, where he studied at Colegio de Chamartín and later graduated as an engineer while also excelling in football as a youth player at Colegio del Pilar.

== Club career ==
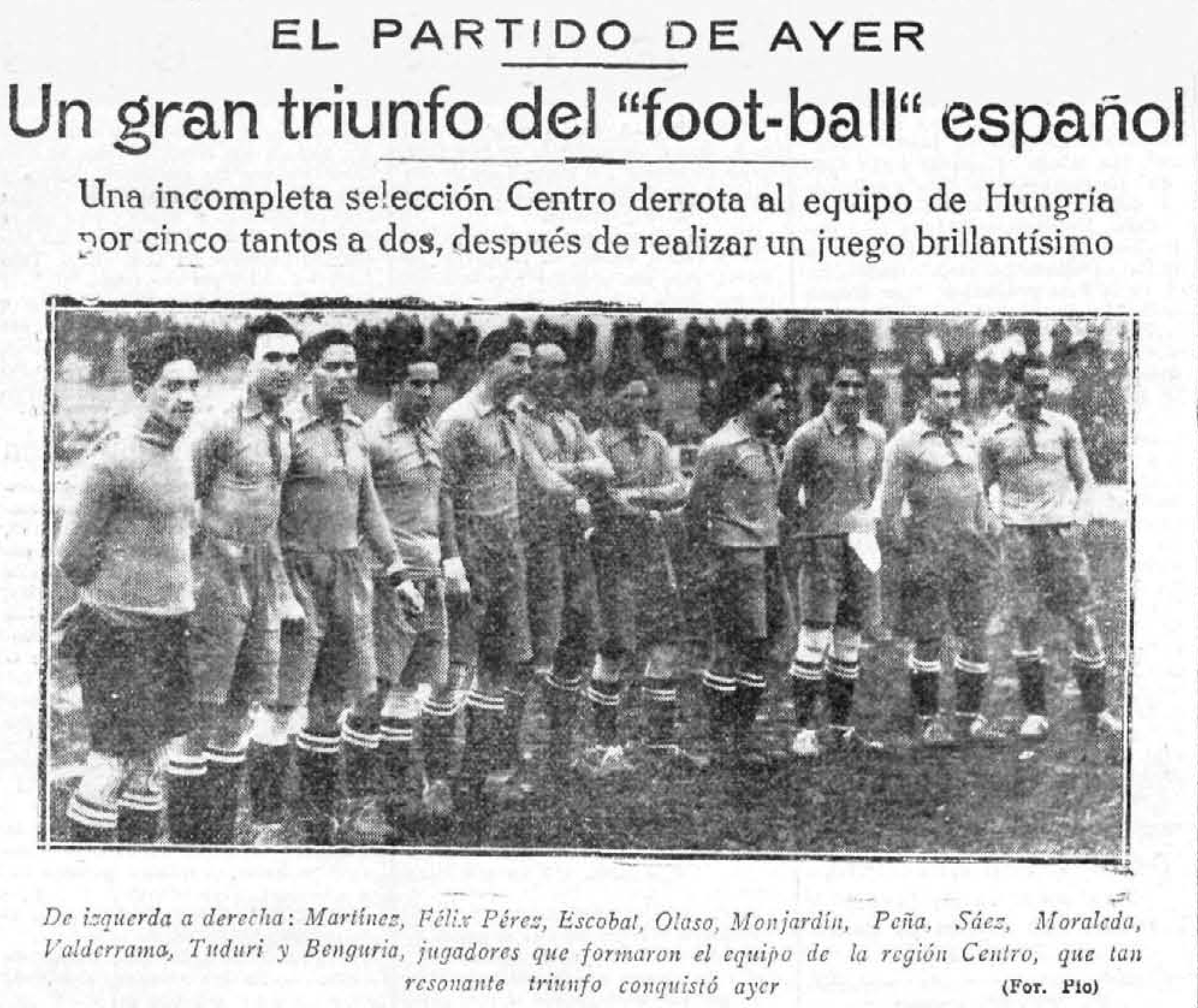
Lineup of the Central region team in a match against Hungary in December 1926: Martínez, Félix Pérez, Escobal, Olaso, Monjardín, Peña, Sáez, Moraleda, Valderrama, Tuduri and Benguria.

In 1920, combining his studies in industrial engineering, he signed for Real Madrid, making his debut in Porto at the age of 18, and playing for the team until 1927, when he was diagnosed with an illness that ended his time as a Madrid player. He was advised to stop actively playing sports and although he remained linked to Madrid as an equipier, he continued playing football for Racing de Madrid, but when Racing withdrew from the championship, he joined CD Nacional de Madrid, and after a short-lived stint there, he finally returned to Real for the 1930–31 season. During his decade in Madrid, Escobal formed a famous and elegant defensive partnership with Félix Quesada, one of the most regular and efficient couples in the history of Real Madrid. It was said that Escobal took street girls for being handsome, cultured and elegant. Eventually, he earned the respect of sports critics, who nicknamed him "the Fakir".

Escobal became captain of the Madrid team, as well as a regular participant in Madrid national team matches against foreign clubs. Likewise, he was present at all the great events that involved Real Madrid, such as at the inauguration of the Campo del Hipódromo.

Following a three-year hiatus, Escobal returned to the active practice of football in his hometown Logroño, where he played for a season and a half, forming a defensive pair with Recarte. On 2 September 1934, he played his last game as an active player and then he left football to dedicate himself entirely to engineering, a profession in which he had a hopeful beginning in the Logroño City Council.

== International career ==
Escobal was a member of the Spanish football squad that competed in the 1924 Summer Olympics, but he did not play in any matches as Spain was knockout by Italy.

== Professional career ==
Perico was a young man with deep political concerns, affiliated with the Republican Left. He firmly believed that Spain would soon experience a period of great prosperity, but things went wrong and the hatred between the political factions soon acquired a dark, almost solid consistency, so Escobal sought refuge in his native Logroño where he took a position as an engineer in the City Council, married Teresa Castroviejo, daughter of a well-known dental professional in Logroño, and played in the local football club, which had just inaugurated the Las Gaunas field. He hung up his boots in 1934 to dedicate himself entirely to engineering, but he was able to keep his job as an engineer in the City Council for only four months since he was unjustly dispossessed in September 1934.

Escobal then earned the dislike of the opposing sector of the Rioja political forces, as he fought for his place with the same intensity that he exhibited on the football fields, but that fight earned him his death in prison. Then with the electoral victory of the Popular Front, on 14 September 1936, he was reinstated in his position and compensated for unfair dismissal.

== Civil War and exile ==
Escobal remained in his job for four months again, until the outbreak of the Spanish Civil War in July 1936. Escobal went to the street once again, but this time heading down a dark path of no return, since he did so by being accused of being a leftist and a Freemason and once again landing him in jail on the rebel side. He was then sentenced to 30 years in prison, but unlike his Republican co-religionists, he saved his life by escaping execution on four occasions not only because of the well-off and good position of his family, but also due to being a famous football player. According to historian Paul Preston, "The scandal that his death could trigger" was what saved him. His fame, however, did not prevent him from being subjected to torture and ill-treatment during his stay in prison. Those eighteen months that he spent sick with tuberculosis, in an infected cot, debased his soul as he witnessed the execution of many of his companions.

In 1940, Escobal hurriedly fled his homeland to board a ship in Portugalete, which took him and his wife, María Teresa Castroviejo, into exile to Cuba and later to the United States, and while in the latter, he wrote a book titled Las Sacas in which he recounted his terrible experience during the war. In the United States, Escobal worked as an engineer and was responsible for the lighting of Queens, for which he was awarded.

After the death of Francisco Franco in Spain, Escobal achieved fame abroad because in 1968, his memoirs appeared in English in 1974 with the title "Death Row" and which, after some clandestine editions, were published in Spanish with the title Las Sacas.

== Death ==
Escobal died alone in New York City on 25 November 2002, at the age of 99. His body remained abandoned in the New York morgue for months before someone buried him. In his hometown, Logroño, this fact went unnoticed, even among those who still remembered him as an extraordinary athlete.

A few years later in 2005, with the latest reissue of his autobiography, Las Sacas, his memory returned to this Rioja land. In a brief note on its website in October 2005, Real Madrid reviewed this reissue in an article called "The memoirs of Perico Escobal, Real Madrid captain sentenced to death".

== Honours ==
Madrid FC

- Centro Championship:
  - Winners (6): 1921–22, 1922–23, 1923–24, 1925–26, 1926–27, and 1930–31

== Bibliography ==
- Escobal, Patricio (1981). Las Sacas [The Sacas] (in Spanish). Logroño: Roldana. ISBN 978-84-85920-01-3. OCLC 1425777846.
- Preston, Paul (2011). El holocausto español. Odio y exterminio en la Guerra Civil y después [The Spanish holocaust. Hate and extermination in the Civil War and after] (in Spanish). Barcelona: Debate. ISBN 978-84-8306-852-6.
