= Alfonso Olaso =

Spanish footballer

Personal information
- Full name: Alfonso Olaso Anabitarte
- Date of birth: 17 March 1905
- Place of birth: Villabona, Gipuzkoa, Spain
- Date of death: 19 December 1937 (aged 32)
- Place of death: Teruel, Aragon, Spain
- Position: Defender

Senior career*
Years	Team	Apps	(Gls)
1925–1926	CD Nacional de Madrid		
1926–1934	Athletic Madrid		

International career
1927	Spain	1	(0)
- * Club domestic league appearances and goals

Alfonso Olaso Anabitarte (17 March 1905 - 19 December 1937) was a Spanish footballer who played as a defender for Athletic Madrid. Olaso earned one cap for the Spain national team. His brother Luis also played for Atlético and Spain in the same period.

== Club career ==
Alfonso Olaso was born in the Basque town of Villabona in 1905. His career was largely in the shadow of his older brother Luis Olaso, a prominent forward for Athletic Madrid and Real Madrid. On the other hand, Alfonso always played on the defense.

Alfonso started playing football at Nacional in Madrid in 1925. At Nacional, he stood out for his great defensive performance, which eventually earned him a move to Athletic Madrid in 1926, joining his brother who had been at the club since 1919 and who was by then an established star of the team together with Monchín Triana. In his first season at the club, he played a pivotal role in helping the club reach the second Copa del Rey final of their history in 1926, starting in a 2–3 loss to FC Barcelona.

In 1929 he was, along with his brother Luis, one of the members of the Athletic Madrid team that played in the first season of the Spanish Football League. Alfonso went down in history as the first-ever player to score an own goal in the history of the Spanish League.

In 1930 the club was relegated to the Spanish Second Division, thus he played the last seasons of his career in the Second Division trying to achieve promotion, but he retired from football in 1934 without having returned to the top, since his retirement coincided with the season in which his club achieved promotion.

== International career ==
Olaso earned his first and last international cap for the Spain national team on 9 May 1927 in a friendly against Italy in Bologna, which ended in a 0–2 loss.

== Death ==
When the Spanish Civil War broke out in 1936, he decided to enlist in the Requeté, with whom he fought throughout the Civil War. Alfonso was present in the Battle of Brunete and after being promoted to lieutenant he fought in the Battle of Teruel. On 18 December 1937, he was taken prisoner by the republicans after losing the position that he defended with his men in the republican offensive against Teruel. He was wounded with two bullet wounds to the torso and his shoulder and was evacuated to the city of Teruel, where he was treated by doctors from the Republican side. However, it's around this time that his trace is lost. There are two versions of what he could have happened to him; according to some he bled to death from the wounds he had received; according to others he was executed for his official status by the men of El Campesino. The exact date of his death is unknown, but it is believed to have been in the days immediately following 18 December 1937.

After the Civil War, the press paid tribute to him on more than one occasion and since the 1950s the Spanish Football Federation decided to launch the Alfonso Olaso award in his memory. The Olaso award honored the best youth player of the football season.

== Honours ==
=== Club ===
- Centro Championship:
  - Winners (1): 1927–28
- Copa del Rey:
  - Runner-up (1): 1926
