= 1922 Copa del Rey =

1922 King Alfonso XIII's Cup
22nd Copa del Rey

Tournament details
- Country: Spain
- Teams: 8

Final positions
- Champions: FC Barcelona (5th title)
- Runners-up: Real Unión

Tournament statistics
- Matches played: 17
- Goals scored: 78 (4.59 per match)

The King Alfonso XIII's Cup 1922 was the 22nd staging of the Copa del Rey, the Spanish football cup competition.

The competition started on 12 March 1922, and concluded on 14 May 1922, with the final, held at the Campo de Coia in Vigo, in which FC Barcelona lifted the trophy for the fifth time with a 5–1 victory over Real Unión thanks to goals from Ramón Torralba, Josep Samitier, Paulino Alcántara (2), and Clemente Gràcia.

== Teams ==
- Biscay Region: Arenas Club de Getxo
- Gipuzkoa Region: Real Unión
- Centre Region: Real Madrid
- South Region: Sevilla FC
- Galicia Region: Fortuna Vigo
- Asturias Region: Sporting de Gijón
- Catalonia Region: FC Barcelona
- Levante Region: España de Valencia

== Quarterfinals ==
=== First leg ===
12 March 1922

| Arenas Club de Getxo | 4–0 | Real Madrid |
|---|---|---|
| Zabalza 9'; Vallana 20' (pen.); Barturen 40'; Zubiaga 70' | Report |

Josaleta Stadium, Getxo
Referee: (Spain) Enrique Peris

12 March 1922

| Real Unión | 4–0 | Fortuna Vigo |
|---|---|---|
| Zabala 34', 43', 59'; Azurza 82' | Report |

Estadio de Amute, Irun
Referee: (Spain) Emilio Sampere

12 March 1922

| Sevilla FC | 0–1 | FC Barcelona |
|---|---|---|
| | Report | Piera 70' |

Campo de la Reina Victoria, Sevilla
Referee: (Spain) Antonio de Cárcer

12 March 1922

| Sporting de Gijón | 6–0 | España de Valencia |
|---|---|---|
| Bolado 25', 60', 70', 80'; Molina 27' (o.g.); Meana 50' | Report |

El Molinón, Gijón
Referee: (Spain) Chopeitia

=== Second leg ===
19 March 1922

| Real Madrid | 5–2 | Arenas Club de Getxo |
|---|---|---|
| Antonio De Miguel 1'; Mejía 9'; Monjardín 49', 75', 89' | Report | Robus 29', 52' |

Campo de O'Donnell, Madrid
Referee: (Spain) José Torrens

Arenas Club de Getxo and Real Madrid won one match each. At that year, the goal difference was not taken into account. A replay match was played.

19 March 1922

| Fortuna Vigo | 0–5 | Real Unión |
|---|---|---|
| | Report | Pagaza 8', 69', 74'; Azurza 21'; Zabala 77' |

Campo de Coia, Vigo
Referee: (Spain) Enrique Peris

Real Unión qualified for the semifinals.

19 March 1922

| FC Barcelona | 7–1 | Sevilla FC |
|---|---|---|
| Alcántara 3', 23', 86'; Samitier 22'; Gràcia 27', 59'; Planas 80' (pen.) | Report | Spencer 71' (pen.) |

Camp de la Indústria, Barcelona
Referee: (Spain) Fernando Gutiérrez

FC Barcelona qualified for the semifinals.

19 March 1922

| España de Valencia | 0–7 | Sporting de Gijón |
|---|---|---|
| | Report | Meana 10' (pen.); Bolado 54', 74', 80'; Arcadio 58', 62', 73' |

Campo del Gimnástico, Valencia
Referee: (Spain) José Llovera

Sporting de Gijón qualified for the semifinals.

=== Replay matches ===
21 March 1922

| Real Madrid | 1–1 (a.e.t.) | Arenas Club de Getxo |
|---|---|---|
| Monjardín 100' | Report | Barturen 119' |

Campo de O'Donnell, Madrid
Referee: (Spain) Julián Ruete

22 March 1922

| Real Madrid | 1–1 | Arenas Club de Getxo |
|---|---|---|
| Escobal 80' | Report | Ino 40' |

Martínez Campos, Madrid
Referee: (Spain) Enrique Peris

29 March 1922

| Real Madrid | 3–0 | Arenas Club de Getxo |
|---|---|---|
| Monjardín 40', 50', 85' | Report |

Martínez Campos, Madrid
Referee: (Spain) Manuel Lemmel

== Semifinals ==
=== First leg ===
2 April 1922

| Real Madrid | 2–1 | Real Unión |
|---|---|---|
| Monjardín 65'; Escobal 81' (pen.) | Report | Patricio 25' |

Madrid
Referee: (Spain) Manuel Lemmel

2 April 1922

| Sporting de Gijón | 1–1 | FC Barcelona |
|---|---|---|
| Bango 88' (pen.) | Report | Planas 16' |

El Molinón, Gijón
Referee: (Spain) Pedro Vallana

=== Second leg ===
9 April 1922

| Real Unión | 4–1 | Real Madrid |
|---|---|---|
| Zabala 4', 11'; Azurza 15'; Acosta 24' | Report | Paco 35' |

Estadio de Amute, Irun
Referee: (Spain) Pedro Vallana

Real Unión and Real Madrid won one match each. At that year, the goal difference was not taken into account. A replay match was played.

9 April 1922

| FC Barcelona | 7–2 | Sporting de Gijón |
|---|---|---|
| Planas 5'; Gràcia 15', 20'; Alcántara 32', 44', 64'; SagiBarba 77' | Report | Palacios 40'; Bango 85' |

Camp de la Indústria, Barcelona
Referee: (Spain) Ezequiel Montero

FC Barcelona qualified for the final.

=== Replay match ===
11 April 1922

| Real Unión | 4–0 | Real Madrid |
|---|---|---|
| Patricio 22'; René Petit 52' (pen.), 75' (pen.); Azurza 87' | Report |

Atotxa Stadium, San Sebastián
Referee: (Spain) Pedro Vallana

Real Unión qualified for the final.

== Final ==
14 May 1922
16:30 CET

| FC Barcelona | 5–1 | Real Unión |
|---|---|---|
| Torralba 22'; Samitier 41'; Alcántara 45', 90'; Gràcia 85' | Report | Patricio 30' |

Campo de Coia, Vigo
Attendance: 12,000
Referee: Thomas Balvay

Copa del Rey 1922 winners
FC Barcelona
5th title
