= José Planas (footballer, born 1901) =

Spanish footballer (1901–1977)

Personal information
- Full name: José Planas Artés
- Date of birth: 14 April 1901
- Place of birth: Barcelona, Spain
- Date of death: 9 April 1977 (aged 75)

Youth career
- L'Avenç del Sport

Senior career*
Years	Team	Apps	(Gls)
1919–1921	L'Avenç del Sport		
1921–1927	Barcelona		
1930–1931	Murcia	2	(1)

Managerial career
- 1929: Racing Ferrol
- 1929–1930: Arenas Club
- 1930: Racing Ferrol
- 1930–1931: Murcia
- 1931–1932: Celta
- 1932–1933: Racing Ferrol
- 1933–1935: Arenas Club
- 1935: Zaragoza
- 1938–1939: Racing Ferrol
- 1940–1941: Barcelona
- 1941–1942: Murcia
- 1942–1943: Racing Ferrol
- 1943: Gimnástico
- 1943–1944: Valladolid
- 1946–1947: Español
- 1949: Ecuador
- 1949: Reus
- 1950: Zaragoza
- 1950–1951: Racing Ferrol
- 1951–1952: San Andrés
- 1954: Tenerife
- 1962–1963: Sabadell
- * Club domestic league appearances and goals

José Planas Artés (14 April 1901 – 9 April 1977) was a Spanish football player and manager.

== Career ==
Born in Barcelona, Planas began his playing career with local side L'Avenç del Sport. He played for Barcelona from 1921 to 1927, where he would make 184 official appearances and win the 1922, 1925, and 1926 Copa del Rey, until he suffered a knee injury that ended his playing career.

As a manager, he took charge of Racing de Ferrol, Arenas Club, Real Murcia, Celta de Vigo, Deportivo La Coruña, Real Zaragoza, Barcelona, Real Valladolid, Espanyol, San Andrés, Tenerife, UD Mahón and Sabadell.
