= Emili Sagi-Barba =

Footballer (1900–1951)

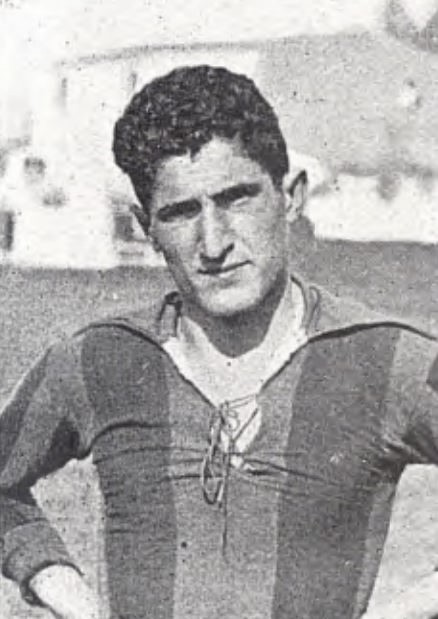
- Sagi-Barba in 1922

Personal information
- Full name: Emilio Sagi Liñán
- Date of birth: 15 March 1900
- Place of birth: Bolívar, Buenos Aires, Argentina
- Date of death: 25 May 1951 (aged 51)
- Place of death: Barcelona, Spain
- Position: Forward

Youth career
- Catalònia

Senior career*
Years	Team	Apps	(Gls)
1915–1932	Barcelona	25	(2)

International career
1927	Spain B	1	(0)
1926	Spain	1	(0)
1924–1931	Catalan XI		
- * Club domestic league appearances and goals

Emilio "Emili" Sagi Liñán (15 March 1900 – 25 May 1951), was a footballer who played as a forward for FC Barcelona. Born in Argentina, he played for the Catalan XI and Spain national teams during the 1920s and 1930s. He was the son of Emilio Sagi Barba, the Catalan baritone singer, and Concepción Liñán Pelegrí, a dancer, and as a result, was widely referred to as Sagi-Barba (father's surnames together in a single surname).

During his playing career he played 455 games and scored 134 goals for FC Barcelona and is best remembered for forming a successful partnership with Paulino Alcántara. Together with Josep Samitier, Ricardo Zamora, Félix Sesúmaga and, later, Franz Platko they were prominent members of the successful FC Barcelona team coached by Jack Greenwell.

His younger brother, Luís Sagi Vela, followed in his father's footsteps and also became a successful baritone singer. His son, Victor Sagi, later ran one of the biggest advertising agencies in Spain and in 1978 announced his candidacy for the presidency of FC Barcelona, but withdrew before the election was held.

== Early life ==
Sagi-Barba was born in Bolívar, Buenos Aires, Argentina, where his father regularly toured and performed, but returned to Catalonia when he was three. He was educated at the Colegio Condal and Colegio Bonanova and his childhood friends included Salvador Dalí and Josep Samitier. During holidays at the Catalan resort of Cadaqués, the trio played football together. He also played football at school and as a junior with FC Catalònia, before joining FC Barcelona in 1915.

== FC Barcelona ==
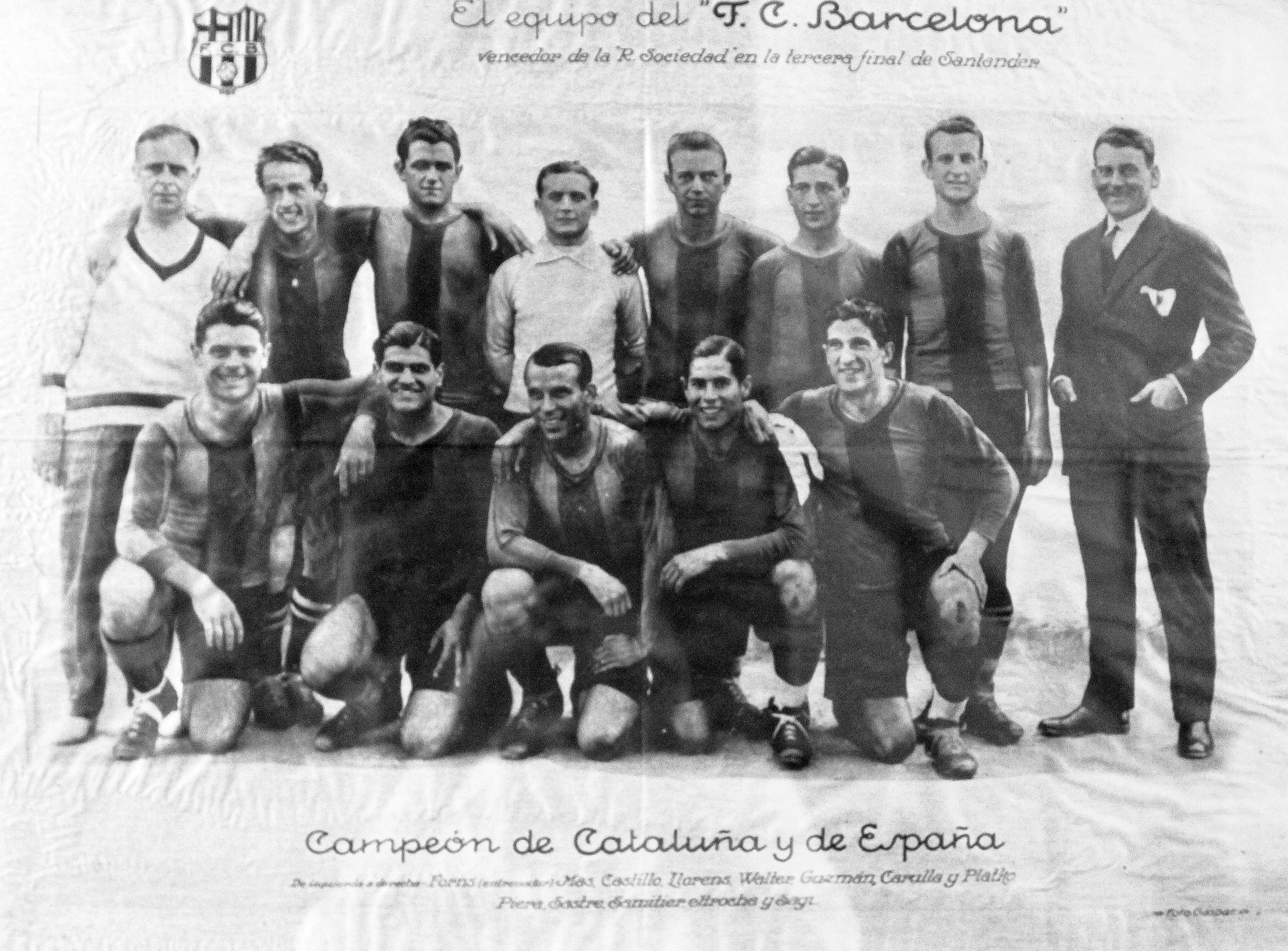
Sagi-Barba (front row, first from right) with FC Barcelona, 1927–28 season.

In 1917, as a 17-year-old, Sagi-Barba made his senior debut with FC Barcelona and during the 1918–19 season he helped the team win the Championat de Catalunya. In 1919 he left FC Barcelona to study in Terrassa. After getting married, he briefly retired from the game. However, in 1922 he rejoined FC Barcelona and embarked on a successful career which saw him win ten Championats de Catalunya, four Copa del Rey and the inaugural La Liga.

== International career ==
Between 1922 and 1936 Sagi-Barba played at least 15 games and scored at least 5 goals for the Catalan XI. However, records from the era do not always include accurate statistics and he may have played and scored more. Together with Paulino Alcántara, Josep Samitier and Ricardo Zamora he helped the Catalan XI win an inter-regional competition, the Prince of Asturias Cup, twice during the 1920s. In the 1924 final, he scored a late equalizer in extra-time to salvage a 4–4 draw and force a replay, in which he helped the Catalan XI win 3–2. He also played once for Spain, in a 4–2 win over Hungary in 1926.

== Honours ==
Barcelona

- Spanish League: 1929
- Spanish Cup: 1922, 1925, 1926, 1928
- Catalan Champions: 1918–19, 1921–22, 1923–24, 1924–25, 1925–26, 1926–27, 1927–28, 1929–30, 1930–31, 1931–32

Catalan XI

- Prince of Asturias Cup: 1923–24, 1926

== See also ==
- List of Spain international footballers born outside Spain
