= 1920 Copa del Rey final =

- Event: 1920 Copa del Rey
Barcelona	Athletic Bilbao
2	0
- Date: 2 May 1920
- Venue: El Molinón, Gijón
- Referee: Enrique Bertrán de Lis
- Attendance: 10,000
- Weather: Rainy

The 1920 Copa del Rey final was the 20th final of the Spanish cup competition, the Copa del Rey. The final was played at El Molinón, in Gijón, on 2 May 1920, in front of an attendance of 10,000 spectators, who saw FC Barcelona beat Athletic Bilbao 2–0, thus winning their fourth cup title. The goals were scored in the second-half by Vicente Martínez and Paulino Alcántara.

The final was attended by a large number of supporters from the Basque region, who arrived in Gijon by train. The match was surrounded by controversy due to referee Enrique Bertrán's performance, who annulled a goal by a penalty awarded to Athletic Bilbao, alleging that scorer Germán Echevarría had shot before he gave the order to do it. Nevertheless, the penalty was not kicked for a second time, as ruled on the laws of the game. The referee was also criticized for allowing misconduct from both teams.

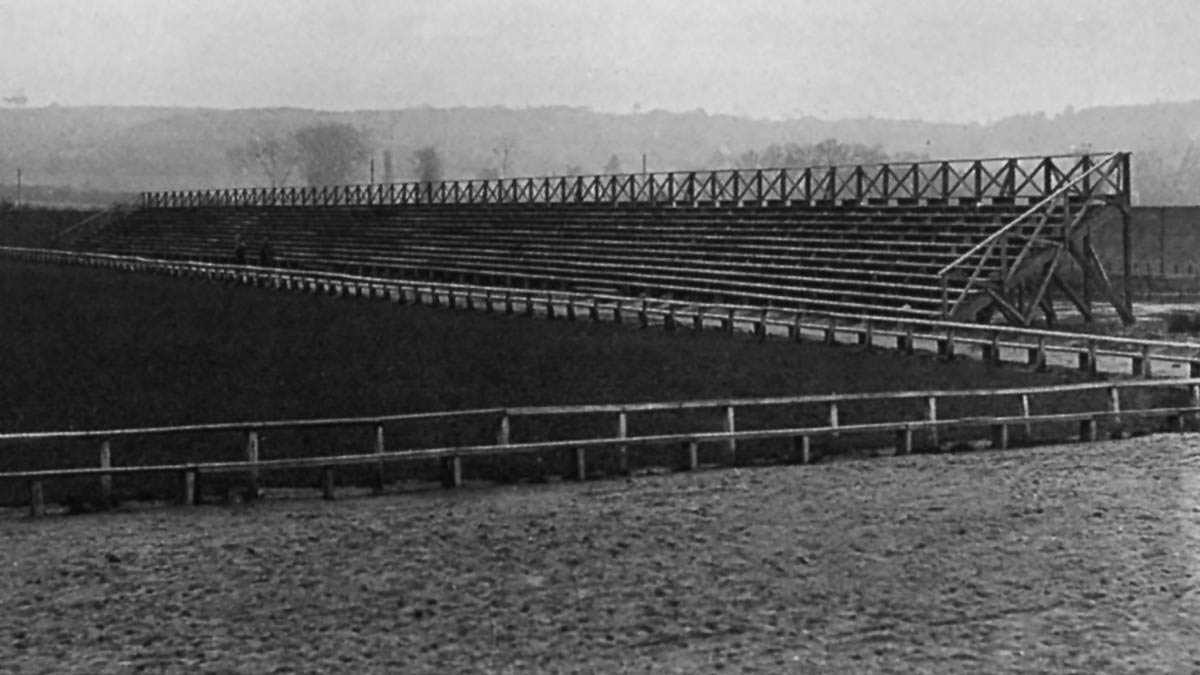
El Molinón Stadium in Gijón, venue for the final

== Match details ==
2 May 1920

Barcelona	2–0	Athletic Bilbao
Martínez 70'; Alcántara 80'	Report1; Report2

El Molinón, Gijón
Attendance: 10,000
Referee: Enrique Bertrán de Lis

Barcelona	Athletic Bilbao

GK	(Spain) Ricardo Zamora
DF	(Spain) Francisco Coma
DF	(Spain) Ricardo Galicia
MF	(Spain) José Samitier
MF	(Spain) Agustín Sancho
MF	(Spain) Ramón Torralba
FW	(Spain) Francisco Vinyals (c)
FW	(Spain) Félix Sesúmaga
FW	(Spain) Vicente Martínez
FW	(Spain) Paulino Alcántara
FW	(Spain) Fernando Plaza
Manager:
(England) Jack Greenwell

GK	(Spain) Juan José Amann
DF	(Spain) Luis Hurtado
DF	(Spain) Domingo Acedo
MF	(Spain) Sabino Bilbao
MF	(Spain) Francisco Belauste
MF	(Spain) Jesús Eguiluz
FW	(Spain) Gregorio Sena
FW	(Spain) Pichichi
FW	(Spain) José María Belauste
FW	(Spain) José María Laca
FW	(Spain) Germán Echevarría
Manager:
(England) Billy Barnes

Copa del Rey
1920 winners
FC Barcelona
Fourth title

== See also ==
Athletic–Barcelona clásico
