= History of the Spain national football team =

Spain
- Nickname: La Roja (The Red One)
- Association: Real Federación Española de Fútbol (RFEF)
- Confederation: UEFA (Europe)
- Most caps: Sergio Ramos (180)
- Top scorer: David Villa (59)

FIFA ranking
- Highest: 1 (July 2008 – June 2009, October 2009 – March 2010, July 2010 – July 2011, October 2011 – July 2014, September 2025 – April 2026, July 2026 –)
- Lowest: 25 (March 1998)

First international
- Spain 1–0 Denmark (Brussels, Belgium; 28 August 1920)

World Cup
- Appearances: 16 (first in 1934)
- Best result: Champions (2010, 2026)

European Championship
- Appearances: 12 (first in 1964)
- Best result: Champions (1964, 2008, 2012, 2024)

Nations League Finals
- Appearances: 3 (first in 2021)
- Best result: Champions (2023)

The history of the Spain national football team dates back to the team's formation and first ever international match in 1920. The Spain national team has experienced a number of successes, most notably their victories at the FIFA World Cup in 2010 and 2026, as well as their record four European titles.

== Beginnings and early success ==
=== Hondarribia, 1913 ===
Spain's first international representative matches was arranged by the influential sports administrator José Ángel Berraondo, under the auspices of the Real Unión Española de Clubs de Foot-ball. The first friendly match, which all took place at Estadio de Amute, Hondarribia, was played against France (called-up by the Ligue de football association, a French federation of football clubs chaired by Jules Rimet) on 25 May 1913. This is not considered an official friendly match by FIFA.

=== Antwerp 1920 Olympic Games ===
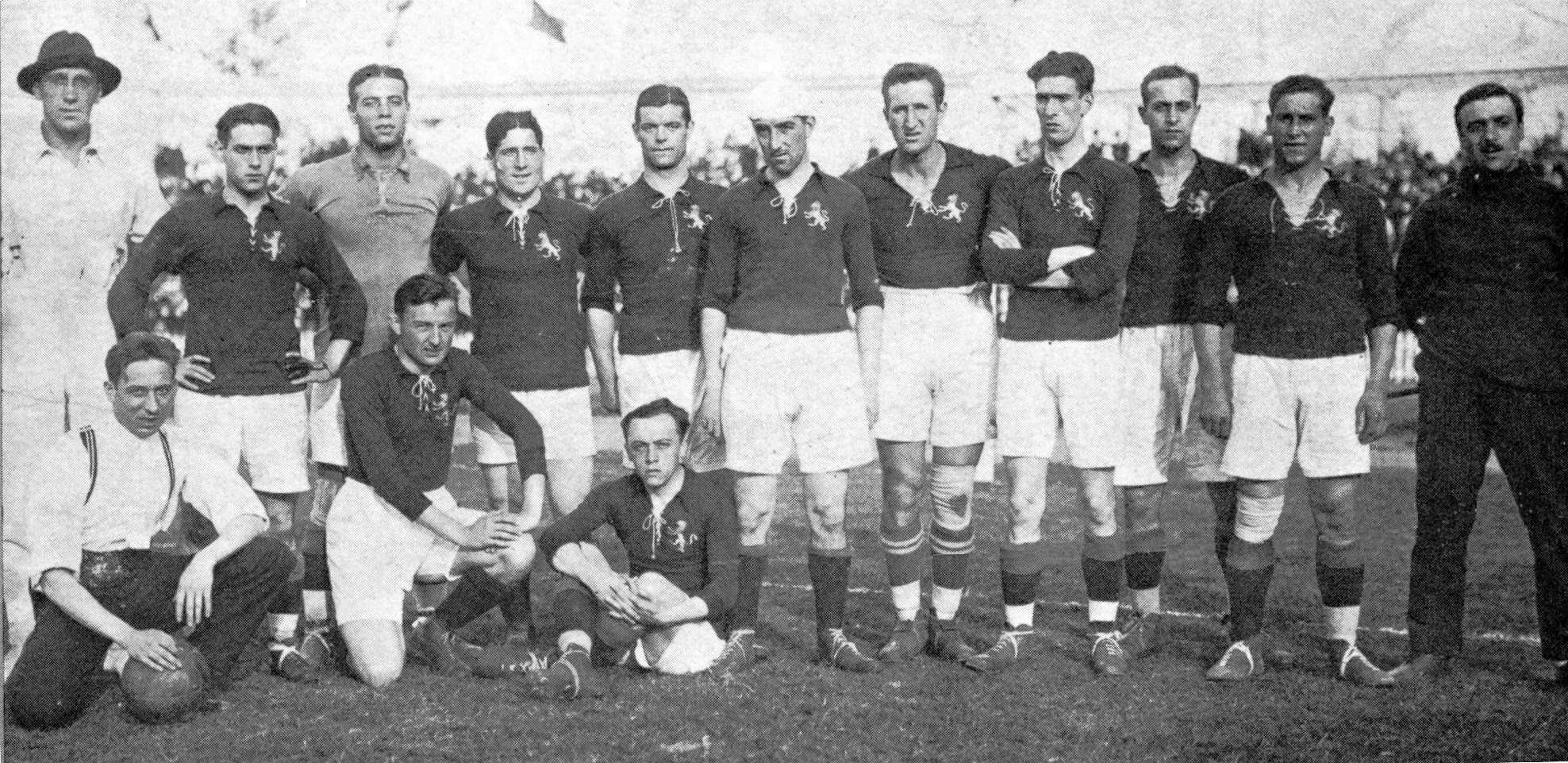
The Spanish squad that played at the 1920 Summer Olympics.

The first Spain national football team was constituted in 1920, with the main objective of finding a team that would represent Spain at the Summer Olympics held in Belgium in that same year.

Spain made their much anticipated debut at the tournament on 28 August 1920 against the national team of Denmark (runners-up in the last two previous Olympic tournament). The match took place at the Stade Joseph Marien in Brussels. The Spanish won that match by a scoreline of 1–0 thanks to a goal from Patricio Arabolaza, who thus became Spain's first international goalscorer. This match would also make Spain, at that time, the 28th nation to play a football match. In their next match stage, Spain were set to play their next game against the hosts Belgium; in that match, Spain could not come up with the victory and lost 1–3.

Hosts Belgium ended up winning the tournament after the Czechoslovaks were disqualified for leaving the pitch in the middle of the final game, thus Spain and another three national teams were giving the chance to play a small consolation tournament where the winner would win either the silver or bronze medal. Their first match in this new "quarter-finals" was played against Sweden in which the Spanish came from a goal behind to win 2–1 at the very end. José María Belauste and Domingo Acedo were the scores of that game. The following match was played against Italy. Félix Sesúmaga scored the two fabulous goals that would give the Spanish a 2–0, eliminating the Italians and giving them the victory to send them to the semi-finals of the tournament (Until UEFA Euro 2012, this had only been the only time Spain had beaten Italy in an official match). The final four teams were Spain, the Netherlands, France and Czechoslovakia. But only the Netherlands advance to final match against Spain due to France not showing up and the Czechs being disqualified previously. In the final match, Spain defeated the Dutch 3–1 with two goals from Félix Sesúmaga and one from Pichichi. With this, Spain won the silver medal at the Olympics and their first international silverware at any tournament.

The medalist at that Olympic tournament were: Domingo Gómez-Acedo, Patricio Arabolaza, Mariano Arrate, Juan Artola, Joaquín Vázquez, José María Belauste, Sabino Bilbao, Ramón Eguiazábal, Moncho, Ricardo Zamora, Silverio Izaguirre, Pichichi, Luis Otero, Francisco Pagazaurtundúa, Josep Samitier, Agustín Sancho, Félix Sesúmaga and Pedro Vallana with the coach at that time Paco Bru.

Although it was a very successful event for the national team, it would take many years later to achieve that success again. In 1929, Spain became the first team from Continental Europe to beat England, winning 4–3 in 1929.

== 1950s ==
The Spanish Civil War and World War II prevented Spain from playing any competitive matches between the 1934 World Cup and the 1950 World Cup qualifiers, where they overcame Iberian rivals Portugal, who later declined an invitation to take part, with a 5–1 win and 2–2 draw. At the finals in Brazil, they topped their group against England, Chile and the United States to progress to the final round. For the first, and so far only time in the history of the FIFA World Cup, the winner was decided, not by a single championship match, but via a group format involving the four teams who had won their respective groups in the previous stage. The four teams in the final group were Uruguay, Brazil, Sweden and Spain. Spain failed to record a win (W0 D1 L2) and finished in fourth place. Until 2010, this had been Spain's highest finish in a FIFA World Cup finals, which had given them the name of the "underachievers." Spain's leading scorer during the 1950 World Cup, who ended the tournament with five goals.

== 1960s ==
Under French-Argentine coach Helenio Herrera and Italian assistant coach Daniel Newlan, Spain came out of dormancy to qualify for the first European Championship in 1960. Spain beat Poland 7–2 on aggregate to progress to the quarter-finals. In the quarter-finals, Spain, who were under Francoist rule, refused to travel to the Soviet Union for political reasons. Proposals to play the tie in a one-legged format at a neutral venue were rejected by the Soviets, and Spain was disqualified.

The Spaniards, led by Alfredo Di Stéfano, qualified for the 1962 World Cup, beating Wales 3–2 over two legs to advance to the UEFA/CAF play-off where they would beat Morocco 4–2 over two legs to advance to the final.

Spain won its first major international title after winning the 1964 European Championship held in Spain. Spain was able to defeat a highly favored Hungary side 2–1 to advance to the final against the Soviet Union, which was awarder a walkover win four years earlier. Spain would go on to win the final played in Madrid by the exact score of 2–1 after Marcelino broke the 1–1 tie in the 84th minute. The victory would stand as Spain's lone major title for 44 years.

Spain qualified for the 1966 World Cup in England, drawn into a group which included West Germany and Argentina. They lost to both those teams 2–1 in Birmingham and Sheffield, respectively. This effectively ensured their elimination from the group stage, although they were able to gain some dignity by beating Switzerland 2–1.

== 1968–1977 and period of decline ==
Spain then reached a low point in its history where they failed to qualify for the 1968, 1972 and 1976 European Championships in Italy, Belgium and Yugoslavia respectively, and they also failed to qualify for the 1970 and 1974 World Cup tournaments in Mexico and West Germany respectively. This reflected the turbulent time in Spain's general history; the fascist government led by Franco was nearing the end of its reign, which effectively happened in 1975.

== Late 1970s–1980s ==
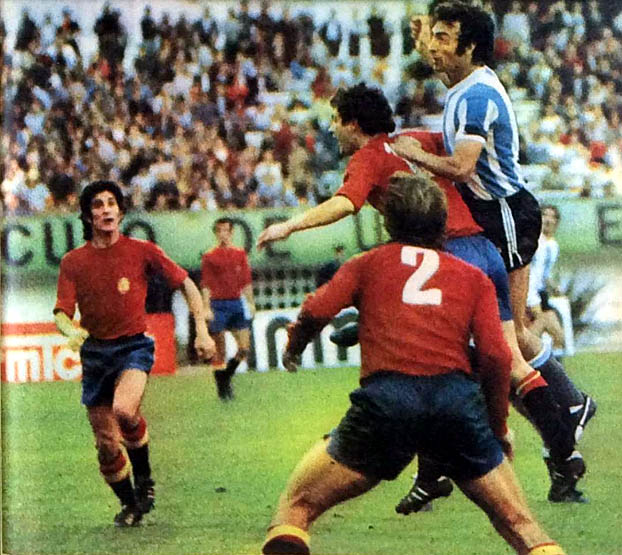
Spain in a friendly match v. Argentina at River Plate, October 1974

Spain qualified for the 1978 World Cup in Argentina. This proved to be a difficult tournament for the Spanish team as they played under varying pitch conditions. Spain lost their first match 2–1 against Austria in the José Amalfitani Stadium of Buenos Aires, which had the best-maintained pitch of the tournament. They then drew with tournament favorites Brazil in Mar del Plata, which had probably the worst-maintained pitch of the tournament; there were rumors the Argentine authorities deliberately sabotaged the Mar del Plata pitch to lessen the chances of Brazil's successes, as Brazil played all their matches there. The atrocious pitch was filled with holes, but Spain kept Brazil from scoring any goals. Spain went back to the excellent pitch of the Estadio José María Minella, where they beat Sweden 1–0. But Spain were eliminated after Austria's two victories and one loss, and Brazil's one win and two draws meant that Spain had a worse record than both.

In 1980, for the first time since 1964, Spain qualified for the European Championships, again held in Italy. However, they were eliminated in the group stage after two 2–1 losses against Belgium and England and a draw against hosts Italy.

=== Spain as the 1982 FIFA World Cup hosts ===
In 1976, Spain was selected as host of the 1982 World Cup. This edition of the World Cup featured 24 teams for the first time. Expectations were high for Spain as the host nation under coach José Santamaría. In the group stage, where they played all their matches at the Luis Casanova Stadium in Valencia. They were drawn into Group 5, in which they could only manage a 1–1 draw with Honduras in their first match. They followed this with a 2–1 victory over Yugoslavia, but were then defeated 1–0 by Northern Ireland. These results were enough to secure progress to the second round, where they were drawn into Group B, but defeats to West Germany and a goalless draw with England – both rather humiliatingly at the Santiago Bernabéu Stadium in Madrid – meant that Spain were knocked out, and Santamaría was subsequently sacked.

Former Real Madrid coach Miguel Muñoz, who had temporarily coached Spain in 1969, returned to coach the national team. Spain was placed in Euro 1984 qualifying Group 7, alongside the Netherlands, the Republic of Ireland, Iceland and Malta. Entering the last match, Spain needed to defeat Malta by at least 11 goals to surpass the Netherlands for the top spot in the group, and after leading 3–1 at half time, Spain scored nine goals in the second half to win by 12–1 and thus also the group. In the final tournament, Spain was drawn into group B with Romania, Portugal, and West Germany. After 1–1 draws against their first two opponents, Spain topped the group by virtue of a 1–0 victory against West Germany. The semi-finals saw Spain and Denmark drawn at 1–1 after extra time, before Spain proceeded by virtue of winning the penalty shootout 5–4 on penalties. Hosts and tournament favourites France defeated Spain 2–0 in the final after a goalless first half.

Spain qualified for the 1986 World Cup in Mexico having topped Group 7 with Scotland, Wales and Iceland. Spain began the group stage by losing to Brazil 1–0, but progressed after beating Northern Ireland 2–1 and Algeria 3–0. Round 2 paired Spain with Denmark, who they overcame 5–1 with Emilio Butragueño scoring four goals, but in the quarter-finals, a 1–1 draw with Belgium ended with Belgium winning 5–4 on penalties.

Muñoz was retained as coach for Euro 1988. As in the several previous tournaments Spain qualified impressively in a group with Austria, Romania and Albania. Spain were drawn into group A and began their tournament with a 3–2 victory over Denmark, but were nevertheless knocked out in the group stage after losing 1–0 and 2–0 to Italy and West Germany respectively.

== 1990s ==
For the 1990 World Cup in Italy, Spain had a new coach, Luis Suárez. Having qualified from a group consisting of Republic of Ireland, Hungary, Northern Ireland and Malta, Spain entered the competition on a good run of form, and after reaching the knock out stages through a 0–0 draw with Uruguay and wins over South Korea (3–1) and Belgium (2–1) in Udine and Verona and winning their group, they fell to a 2–1 defeat to Yugoslavia in their Round of 16 match in Verona.

Newly appointed coach Vicente Miera failed to gain qualification for Spain for Euro 1992, after finishing third in a group behind France and Czechoslovakia. Vicente Miera did, however, lead Spain to the gold medal at the 1992 Olympics in Barcelona.

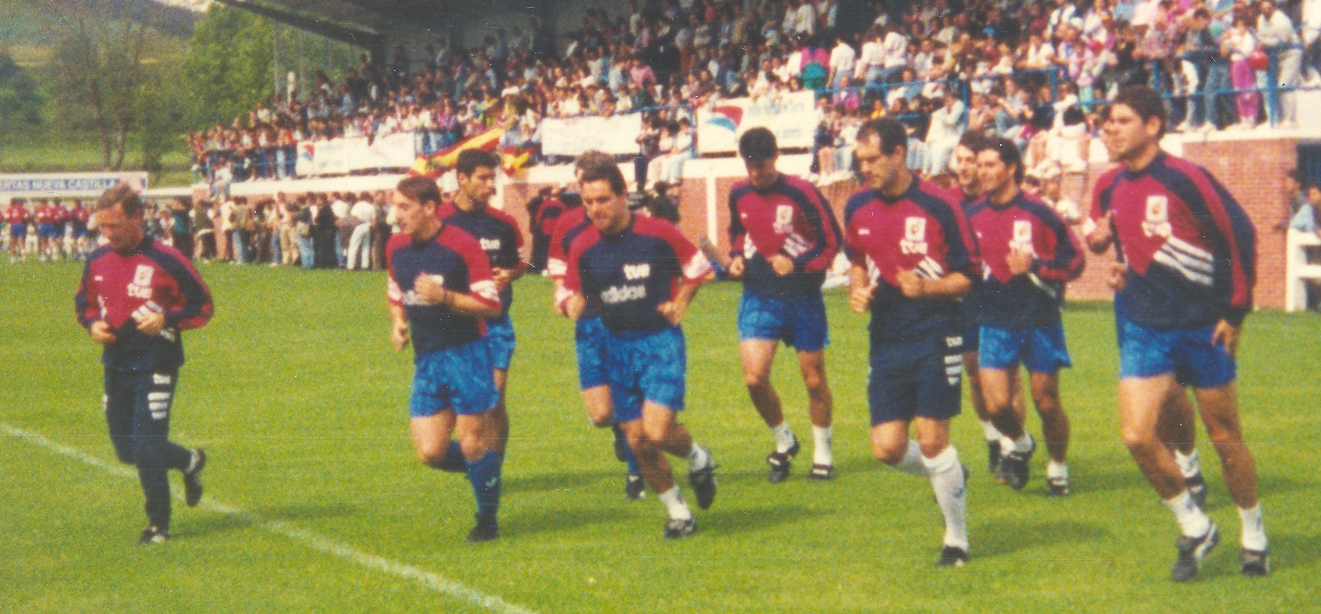
Javier Clemente and the Spain team in a training session in 1994.

Javier Clemente was appointed as Spain's coach in 1992, and the qualification for the 1994 World Cup in the United States was achieved with eight wins and one loss in twelve matches. In the final tournament Spain were in Group C in which they drew with Korea Republic 2–2 in Dallas and 1–1 with Germany in Chicago, before qualifying for the second round with a 3–1 victory over Bolivia, again in Chicago. Spain continued through the second round with a 3–0 victory over Switzerland in Washington, but their tournament ended with a controversial 2–1 defeat to Italy in the quarter-finals in Foxborough near Boston, after star forward Luis Enrique was elbowed in the face by Mauro Tassotti in the Italian penalty box which caused him to visibly bleed from his nose.

Spain qualified for Euro 1996 in England from a group consisting of Denmark, Belgium, Cyprus, Macedonia and Armenia. In the final tournament, Spain faced group matches in Leeds against Bulgaria, France and Romania. With 1–1 draws against the first two opponents, and a 2–1 win over Romania, Spain had confirmed their place in the quarter-finals to play England at London's Wembley Stadium. Spain were the better team for much of the game and had a legitimate goal disallowed. After the game finished 0–0, they eventually lost 4–2 in the shootout.

In his second World Cup as Spain's coach, Clemente led his team undefeated through their qualifying group in which Yugoslavia and Czech Republic were the other contenders. Spain qualified with fourteen other European sides in the first ever thirty-two team World Cup. Drawn into Group D at the final tournament, Spain's opponents consisted of Nigeria and Paraguay, as well as previous World Cup semi-finalists Bulgaria.

Their campaign saw them first pitched against Nigeria in Nantes, with Spain taking the lead after 20 minutes from a curling Fernando Hierro free kick, to great delight of the Spanish crowd. The Nigerians equalised four minutes later, however, to leave the scoreline at 1-1 before the half-time break. Spain once again took the lead after one minute played of the second-half as Hierro played a long aerial pass to Raúl, who volleyed in the ball from close-range to give the Spanish a 2–1 lead. Nigeria's attempts at equalising proved unsuccessful until the 73rd minute courtesy of Garba Lawal whose pass after running down the left wing was poorly dealt with by goalkeeper and captain Andoni Zubizarreta, who failed to catch the ball and deflected it into his own net to tie the game at 2–2 with little over 15 minutes left of play. Nigeria won a throw-in with four minutes left to play, but was poorly dealt with by the Spanish defense, allowing Sunday Oliseh to strike a powerful shot from the rebound just outside the box past Zubizarreta to give Nigeria a 3–2 lead that they would hold on to.

Their next game was a goalless draw against a José Luis Chilavert-inspired Paraguay in Saint-Etienne, giving Spain a mere point after two games, but their chances of qualification remained alive. Going into their last game against a weaker Bulgaria team in Lens, Spain needed to defeat their fellow Europeans and for Nigeria to either beat Paraguay or draw. Spain did their part by trampling the Bulgarians with a scoreline of 6–1 and completing their group stage campaign with four points, but it was not enough as Paraguay beat group leaders Nigeria 3–1, placing them in second place ahead of Spain and Bulgaria, who were eliminated by finishing third and fourth in their group respectively.

== 2000s: Start of golden years and Euro 2008 triumph ==
After a 3–2 opening defeat to Cyprus in Euro 2000 qualifying, Clemente was fired and José Antonio Camacho was appointed as coach. Spain won the rest of their games to qualify for the final tournament, where they were drawn into Group C. A 1–0 defeat to Norway was followed by victories over Slovenia (2–1) and Yugoslavia (4–3), with Spain thus setting up a quarter-final against 1998 World Cup champions France, which was won 2–1 by eventual Euro champions France, with Raúl missed a penalty in the final minutes.

The qualifying tournament for the 2002 World Cup went as expected for Spain as the team topped a group consisting of Austria, Israel, Bosnia and Herzegovina and Liechtenstein. In the final tournament, Spain won its three matches in group B, against Slovenia, Paraguay (both by a score of 3–1) and South Africa (3–2). Spain beat the Republic of Ireland on penalties in the second round, and faced co-hosts South Korea in the quarter-finals. In what is considered a highly controversial match, Spain eventually lost in a penalty shootout after having two goals called back for alleged infractions during regular and extra time.

At Euro 2004 qualifying, Spain only finished second in their group, being stunned by the Greeks with a shock home loss and only managed to qualify for Euro 2004 by overcoming Norway. In the main tournament, Spain was drawn into group A with hosts Portugal, Russia and Greece, behind whom they had finished second in qualifying. Spain defeated Russia 1–0 and drew 1–1 with Greece, but failed to get the draw they needed against Portugal to proceed to the knock out stages. Iñaki Sáez was sacked weeks later and replaced by Luis Aragonés.

UEFA Euro 2008 Final starting lineup on 29 June 2008, in Vienna (Ernst Happel Stadion).

Spain qualified for the 2006 World Cup only after a play-off against Slovakia, as they had finished behind Serbia and Montenegro in Group 7, which also included Bosnia and Herzegovina, Belgium, Lithuania and San Marino. In Group H of the German hosted finals, Spain won all their matches, and beat Ukraine 4–0, Tunisia 3–1 and Saudi Arabia 1–0. Spain, however, fell 3–1 in the second round to France, with only the consolation of a share, with Brazil, of the 2006 FIFA Fair Play Award.

After being eliminated from the competition, Luis Aragonés came to the decision that the team was not physical or tough enough to be able to out-muscle opponents, they therefore opted to start concentrating on monopolising the ball and thus started to employ the tiki-taka – a style characterised by short passing and movement, working the ball through various channels, and maintaining possession. Raphael Honigstein describes it as "a significant upgrade of the Dutch 'total football', a system that relied on players changing positions".

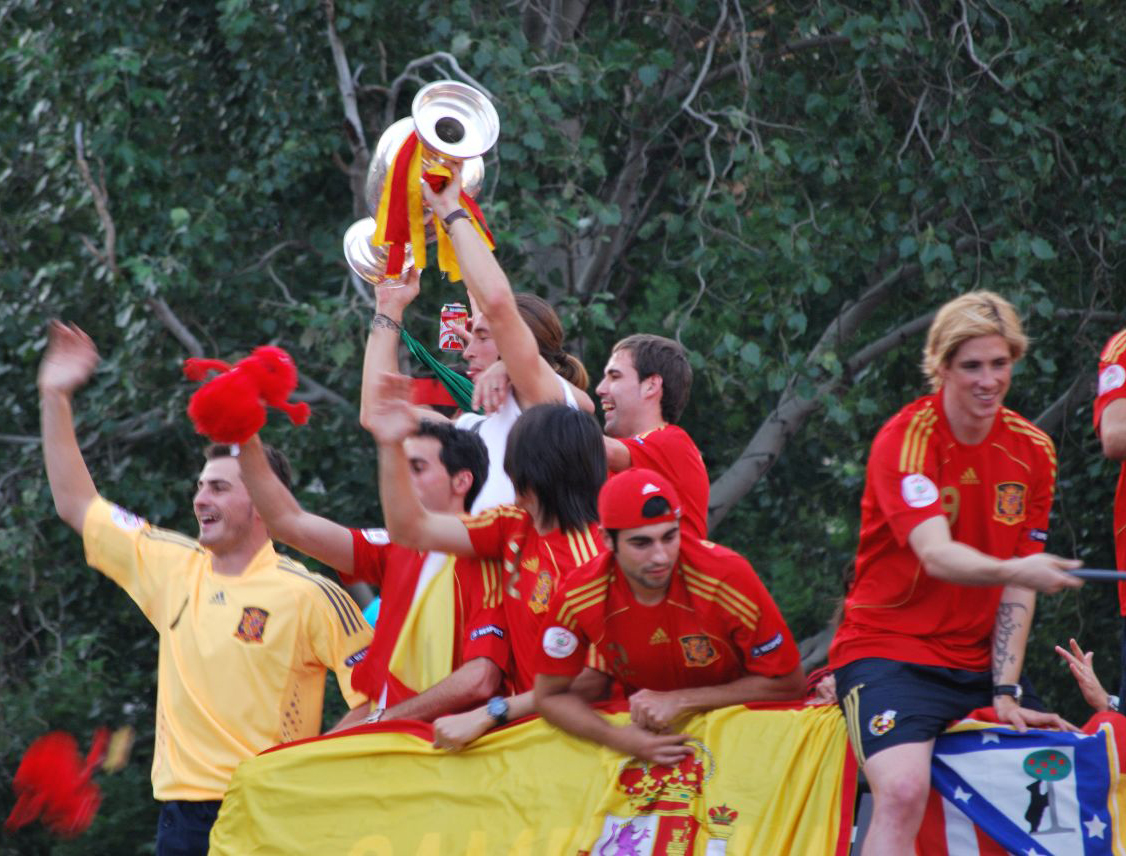
Spanish players celebrating their victory in Madrid.

Spain qualified for Euro 2008 at the top of Qualifying Group F with 28 points out of a possible 36, and were seeded 12th for the finals. They won all their games in Group D: 4–1 against Russia, and 2–1 against both Sweden and defending champions Greece.

Reigning World Cup holders Italy were the opponents in the quarter final match, and held Spain to a 0–0 draw resulting in a penalty shoot-out which Spain won 4–2. Spain met Russia again in the semi-final, again beating them, this time 3–0.

In the final, played in Vienna's Ernst-Happel-Stadion, Spain defeated Germany 1–0, with a goal scored by Fernando Torres in the 33rd minute. This was Spain's first major title since the 1964 European Championship. Spain were the top scoring team, with 12 goals, and David Villa finished as the top scorer with four goals; Xavi was awarded the player of the tournament, and nine Spanish players were picked for the Euro 2008 Team of the Tournament.

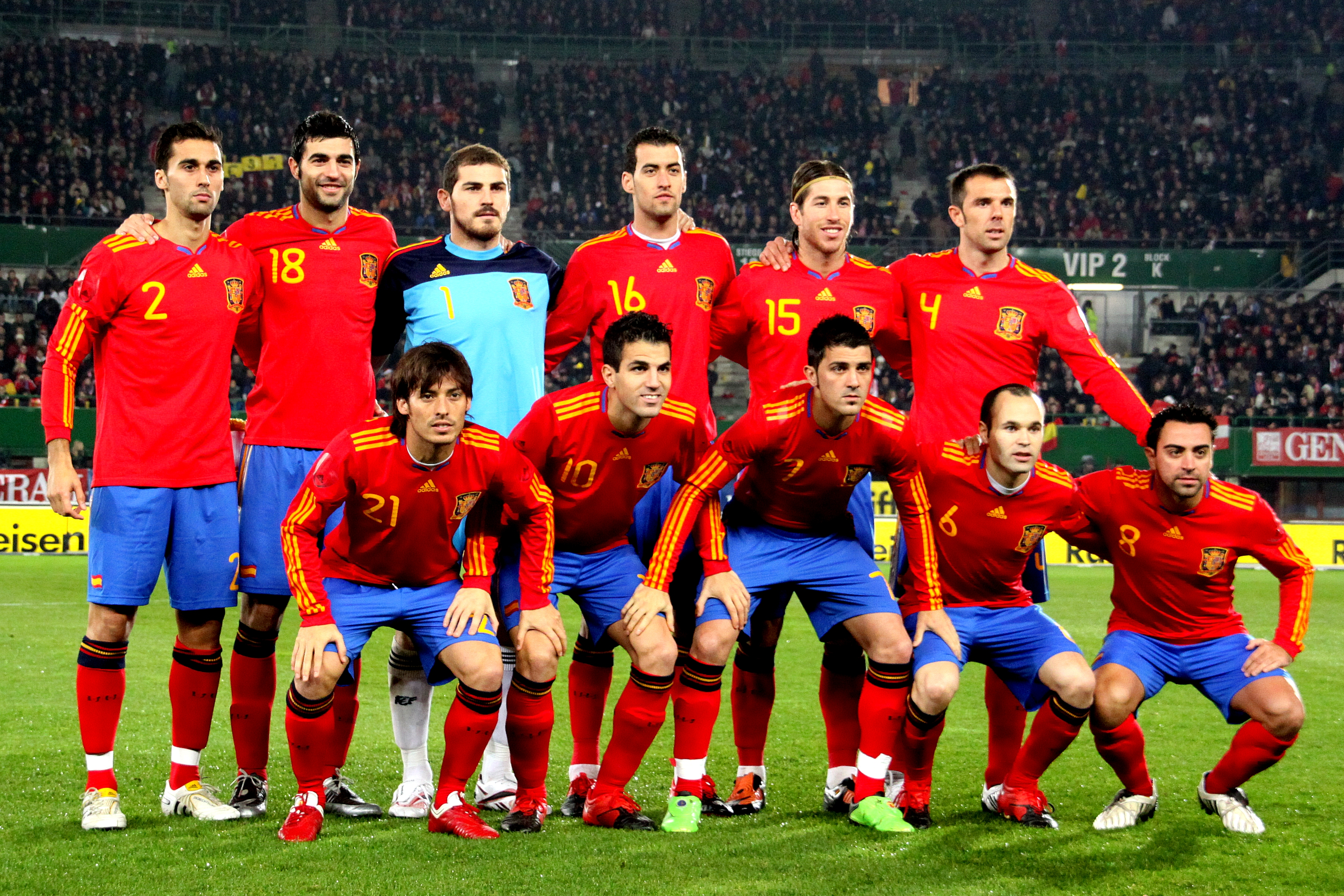
Austria lost to Spain by a score of 5–1 in November 2009 in Ernst-Happel-Stadion, Vienna

Luis Aragonés left the manager's role after the Euro 2008 success, and was replaced by Vicente del Bosque.

2008 saw David Villa score 16 goals in 15 games, breaking the Spanish record of ten goals in one year held by Raúl since 1999. On 11 February 2009, Villa broke another Spanish record as his 36th-minute goal against England saw him become the first Spanish player to score in six consecutive games. By the start of the tournament, Del Bosque's had ten consecutive wins, making him the first international manager to do so from his debut, breaking João Saldanha's record – held since 1969 – of nine consecutive wins with Brazil.

Spain won all three of its matches at the group stage, the 5–0 win over New Zealand including a Fernando Torres] hat-trick that is the earliest and fastest hat-trick in the tournament's history. With further wins over Iraq (1–0) and South Africa (2–0) they earned not only qualification for the semi-finals, but also obtained the world record for 15 consecutive wins and tied the record of 35 consecutive unbeaten games (with Brazil).

On 24 June 2009, Spain's undefeated record ended when the United States beat Spain 2–0 in the 2009 FIFA Confederations Cup semi-finals which sent Spain to the third place match. This was Spain's first defeat since 2006. Spain defeated hosts South Africa 3–2 after extra time in the third-place playoff.

On 9 September 2009, Spain secured its place at the 2010 World Cup finals in South Africa after beating Estonia 3–0 in Mérida. Spain went on to record a perfect World Cup qualifying record with ten wins out of ten in Group 5, finishing with a 5–2 victory over Bosnia and Herzegovina on 14 October 2009. The Spanish team entered the 2010 World Cup ranked number 2 on the FIFA rankings and as clear favorites to win the tournament.

== The 2010s: continued success and decline ==
=== 2010 FIFA World Cup winners ===

2010 FIFA World Cup Final starting lineup on 11 July 2010, in Johannesburg (Soccer City).

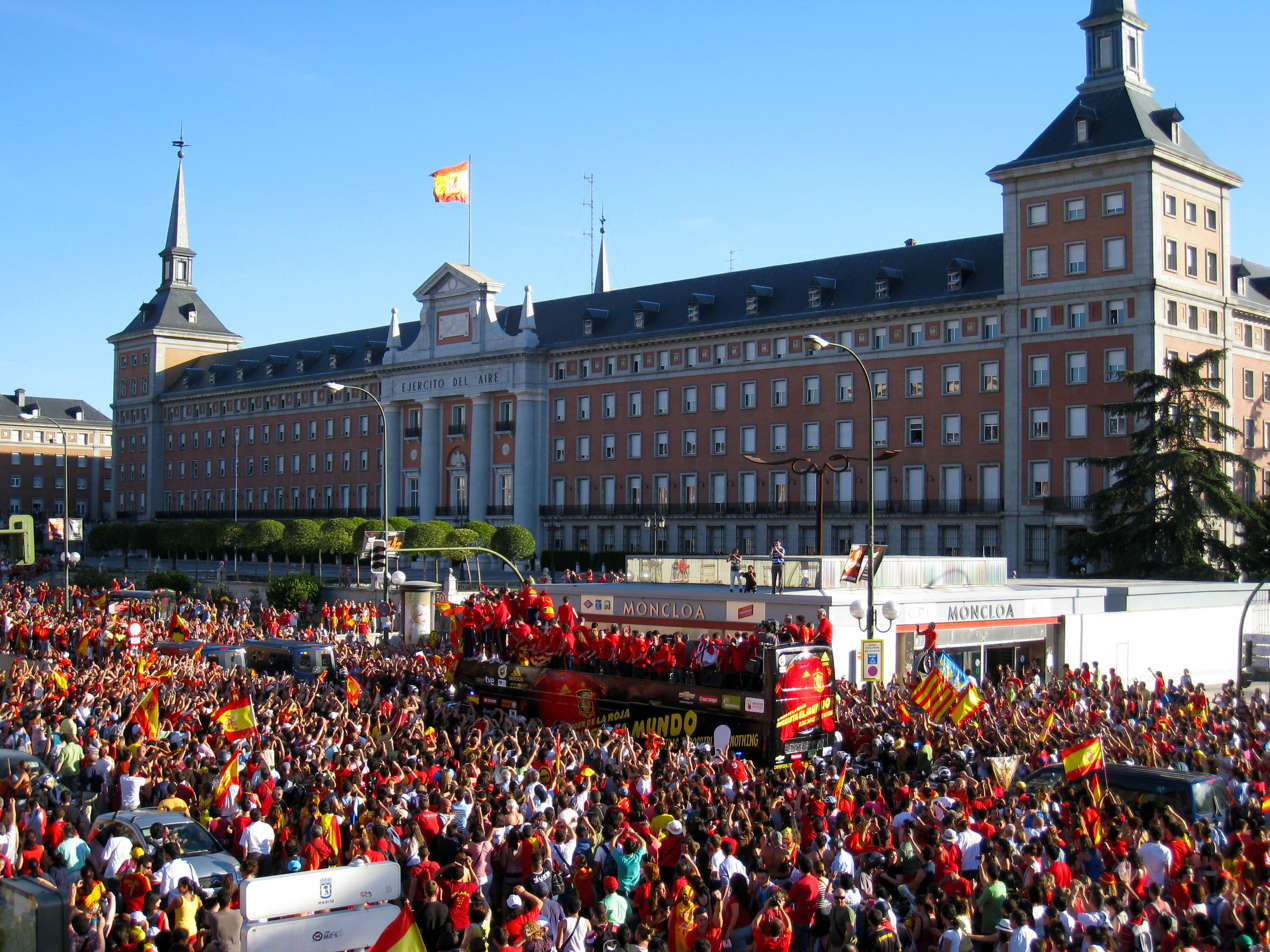
World Cup champions parade, celebrate as they pass in front of the Air Force Headquarters in Madrid.

The 2010 World Cup draw, which took place on 4 December 2009, placed Spain in Group H, alongside Switzerland, Honduras and Chile. Spain lost its first group stage match against Switzerland, 0–1. In their second match they defeated Honduras by two goals from David Villa. Their next match against Chile on 25 June was won 2–1. They advanced to the knock-out stage to defeat Portugal 1–0, reaching the quarter-finals in which they defeated underdogs Paraguay 1–0, with another goal by David Villa, reaching the last four for the first time since 1950. They then advanced to the final for the first time ever by defeating Germany 1–0 via a headed goal from Carles Puyol.

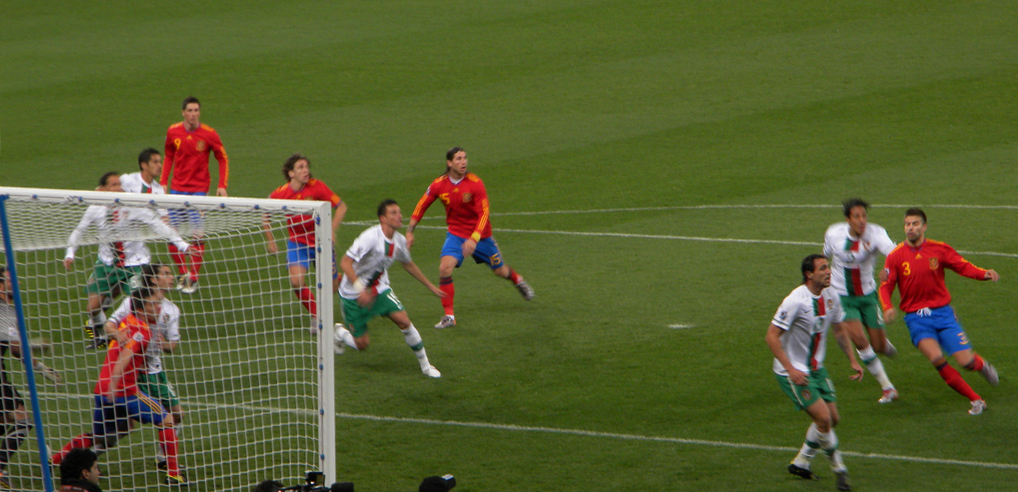
Spain take a corner against Portugal in a Round of 16 match in the 2010 FIFA World Cup.

In the final four minutes of extra time during the World Cup final in Johannesburg against the Netherlands, Andrés Iniesta scored a single goal from a pass given by Cesc Fàbregas, winning the World Cup for Spain for the first time in their history. In this physical match, Spain received five yellow cards while the Netherlands received nine, as well as one red card, the highest total of cards for a World Cup final in history. Spain won the World Cup by only scoring eight goals and conceding two, which is the lowest by any World Cup winner in both cases. Also, they are the only team not to have conceded a goal in the last four games of the tournament. Spain are one of two teams that have won the World Cup title after losing its opening game. Spain are only the second team to win a World Cup outside their own continent, following Brazil's wins in Sweden and Korea-Japan, which also makes Spain the first European team to win the World Cup outside of Europe (followed four years later by Germany). It is also the only European champion to not have at least one championship won in home soil (Italy, West Germany, England and France have all won at least one or their sole final on home soil).

The 2010 World Cup squad won the FIFA Fair Play Award while some of its players also won awards. Goalkeeper Iker Casillas won the golden glove for only conceding two goals during the tournament. David Villa won the bronze ball and silver boot, tied for top scorer of the tournament with a total of five goals and one assist.

=== UEFA Euro 2012 champions ===
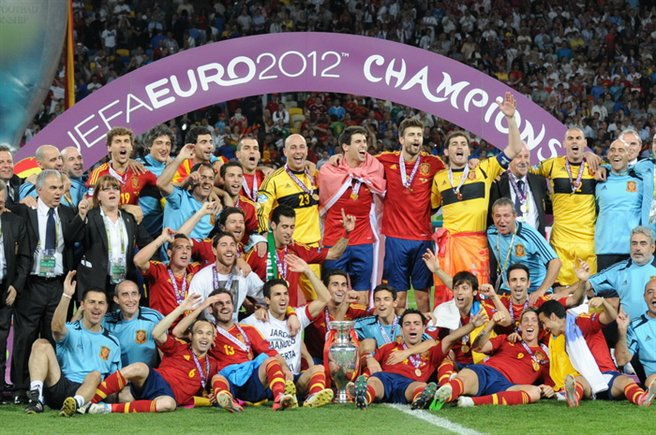
Spain with the trophy, after winning Euro 2012.

Spain qualified top of Group I in qualification for UEFA Euro 2012 with a perfect, 100% record. Spain defeated Czech Republic, Scotland, Lithuania and Liechtenstein to advance to the main tournament, where they became the first team to retain the European championship.

Spain were drawn in Group C in the group stage, alongside Italy, Croatia and Republic of Ireland. Spain opened their group stage match against Italy on 10 June 2012. Italy took the lead in the second half of the match, through substitute and Italian striker Antonio Di Natale in the 61st minute, who had come on to replace another striker, Mario Balotelli. Three minutes later, Spain found an equalizer, in which midfielder David Silva assisted another midfielder, Cesc Fàbregas, who in turn slotted the ball past goalkeeper Gianluigi Buffon.

Spain's next match was against Republic of Ireland. Fernando Torres opened the goalscoring, early in the fourth minute, before scoring the goal from ten yards. In the 49th minute, David Silva extended the lead for Spain, nutmegging three defenders in the process, after Given blocked Iniesta's shot. With 20 minutes of the match remaining, Torres scored his second goal, as he chipped the ball past Given. The final goal was scored by Fábregas, in which he scored from a difficult angle.

Their third and final group stage match against Croatia, proved to be more difficult than expected, as Croatia had several goalscoring chances, notably from Croatian players Ivan Strinić and Ivan Perišić, which Spain goalkeeper Iker Casillas had no problems dealing with. The match looked like it was heading for a draw, until the 88th minute, in which substitute Jesús Navas struck the winning goal, after a chip from Cesc Fàbregas allowed Iniesta a simple assist.

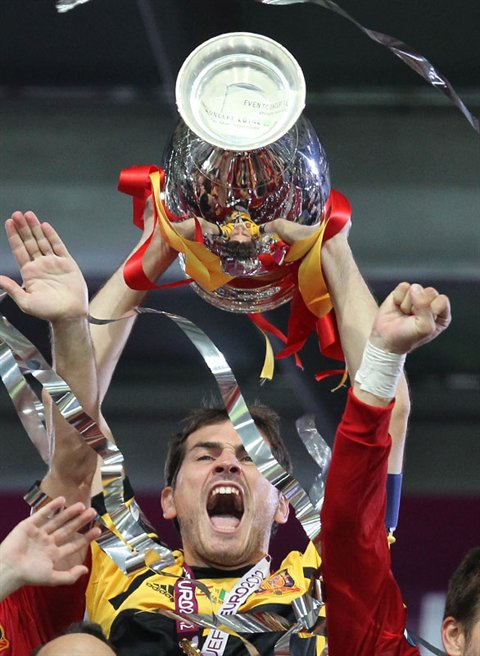
The captain Iker Casillas, lifting the Euro 2012 trophy.

In the quarter-finals, on 23 June 2012, Spain took on France. Spain opened the goalscoring, after defender Jordi Alba's assist, which midfielder Xabi Alonso scored with a header past France goalkeeper Hugo Lloris. Spain completed their win, late in the second half, with Alonso stepping up to score the penalty kick, after France defender Anthony Réveillère brought down Spain striker Pedro inside the penalty area.

Spain faced Portugal in the semi-finals. The decisive match proved to be more difficult than expected, with Portugal having numerous goalscoring chances. Spain, however, held on, which required the match to go into extra time. Spain showed signs of improvement, but nevertheless, failed to score over both halves. A penalty shoot-out was then ensued. Spain emerged victorious, and were in a UEFA European Football Championship final for the fourth time, since 1964, 1984 and 2008.

UEFA Euro 2012 Final starting lineup on 1 July 2012.

In the final match, Spain won the tournament by a score of 4–0 over Italy. Spain quickly took control in the first half, with goals in the 14th minute from a header by David Silva, and in the 41st minute from Jordi Alba. Spain increased their lead to 4–0 in the second half, with goals from Fernando Torres in the 84th minute, and from Juan Mata in the 88th minute, helping them to win their second straight European Championship, and their third straight major tournament title (Euro 2008 and 2010 World Cup). Fernando Torres finished as the top goalscorer of the tournament with 3 goals.

Given the final victory Spain broke several records:

- Spain became the first team since the founding of the FIFA World Cup in 1930 to win three consecutive major titles (UEFA European Championship 2008, FIFA World Cup 2010, UEFA European Championship 2012).
- Spain became the first team to reach the final as the reigning European champion since Germany did in 1976.
- Spain became the joint most successful team in European Championship history, alongside Germany with three titles each.
- Spain is the first national team to have won the FIFA World Cup and retain their continental championship.

=== 2013 FIFA Confederations Cup ===
Before the start of the tournament, La Roja played two international friendlies in the United States, winning both games by a score of 2–1 and 2–0 respectively. Spain started the 2013 FIFA Confederations Cup campaign with a 2–1 win over Uruguay, a match that Spain dominated throughout, managing to make nine shots on target compared to Uruguay's one. At the second group stage match, against Tahiti, Spain broke the record for the largest margin of victory in a senior FIFA match, winning 10–0. Then they beat Nigeria 3–0 in the last group match. In their semi-final match against Italy, the game went 0–0 all the way to penalties, which Spain then won 7–6. This put them through to their first Confederations Cup Final, which they lost 0–3 against Brazil. Fernando Torres was once again the top goalscorer of the tournament, with five goals.

=== 2014 FIFA World Cup ===
On 30 July 2011, at the 2014 FIFA World Cup preliminary draw, Spain were placed in Group I. They commenced their qualifying campaign in late 2012 in a group that featured France, Belarus, Georgia and Finland. They started their World Cup campaign with a hard-fought away victory over Georgia in which Roberto Soldado scored in the 85th minute after the Georgians defended with 11 players in all 90 minutes of the game, hitting the post in the beginning of the second half.

Spain were considered among the favourite teams to win the 2014 World Cup, a belief further supported by the group they were sorted in, which was composed by Chile, Australia and the Netherlands. Their first match in the World Cup was coincidentally the last one they played in 2010: a rematch of the 2010 final against Netherlands. Spain started taking the lead of the match thanks to a Xabi Alonso penalty kick, but the Dutch quickly responded to the goal and proved to be a superior team this time, equalising just before the half-time whistle thanks to a header from Dutch captain Robin van Persie from outside the penalty box. The Dutch completed the turnaround of the scoreline after a second goal came from Arjen Robben, as the Spanish lost control of the match and ultimately suffered a disastrous defeat of 5–1 at Arena Fonte Nova.

Needing to right the ship against Chile in order to maintain their hopes of defending the title, the two teams faced in the Estádio do Maracanã. The Latin American team proved to be tougher than they expected and ultimately won the match 2–0. With both matches lost, Spain became the fourth team to be eliminated in the group stages of the World Cup, and also entered the list of the defending World Cup champions who have been eliminated in the first group stages of the subsequent World Cup, along with Brazil in 1966, France in 2002 and Italy in 2010. Nonetheless, Spain defeated Australia 3–0 at the Arena da Baixada to secure a third-place finish in Group B with three points.

=== UEFA Euro 2016 ===
Spain was drawn in Group C with Ukraine, Slovakia, Belarus, Macedonia and Luxembourg for the UEFA Euro 2016 qualifying. They ended up as winners of the group, with just one defeat (against Slovakia).

During the final tournament, Spain was drawn in Group D with Croatia, Turkey and the Czech Republic. On 13 June, they defeated the Czech Republic 1–0 at Toulouse, and four days later they defeated Turkey 3–0 in Nice; however, on 21 June Spain was unexpectedly defeated by Croatia 2–1 in Bordeaux. This meant that they finished as runners-up of Group D, behind the Croatians.

For the round of 16, Spain was drawn against Italy, winners of Group E. The match, played in the Stade de France on 27 June, saw the Azzurri winning over Spain 2–0, knocking the reigning champions out of the tournament.

=== 2018 FIFA World Cup and warm-up preparation friendlies ===
Spain qualified undefeated for the 2018 FIFA World Cup in Russia with a record of 9 wins, 1 draw. On 27 March 2018 at the Wanda Metropolitano stadium in Madrid, Spain routed Argentina 6–1 in a warm-up preparation friendly match, in which Isco scored a hat-trick. It was Spain's biggest win over another previous World Cup champion, and Argentina's biggest loss since 2009, and also tied the record for Argentina's biggest loss overall, by a margin of five goals. On 13 June 2018, the day before the start of the World Cup, it was announced that head coach Julen Lopetegui had been sacked after the news that he was taking over Real Madrid after the World Cup. He was replaced by Fernando Hierro.

The first match against Portugal ended in a 3–3 draw: Diego Costa scored the first two goals for Spain, and Nacho the last one, while Cristiano Ronaldo scored a hat-trick for Portugal. Spain won the second match against Iran with a goal by Diego Costa. They were eventually defeated in the round of 16 by host country Russia through a penalty shootout after the match ended 1–1.

== The 2020s: resurgence and second golden generation ==
=== UEFA Euro 2020 and 2021 UEFA Nations League Finals ===
Spain was drawn in Group F with Sweden, Norway, Romania, Faroe Islands and Malta for the UEFA Euro 2020 qualifying. They ended up as winners of the group, remaining undefeated during this stage.

During the final tournament, held in 2021 due to the COVID-19 pandemic, Spain was drawn in Group E with Sweden, Slovakia and Poland; the team itself was already tipped alongside Belgium and France as the top favorites to win the European trophy. On 14 June, they shockingly drew 0–0 with Sweden, and on 19 June they drew 1–1 with Poland, as for the result, the team's poor forms in both games were subject to criticisms. Although they won 5–0 against Slovakia on 23 June, that was not enough to top the group and therefore they ended up in second place.

For the round of 16, Spain was drawn against Croatia, runners-up of Group D, and achieved a thrilling 5–3 win after extra-time on 28 June in Copenhagen. In the quarter-finals, they faced Switzerland, which had just knocked world–champions France out of the tournament on 2 July. Spain won 3–1 on penalties (after a 1–1 draw) over a highly disciplined Swiss team and advanced to the semi-finals of the tournament, having also faced criticism for failing to win in regulation time even though Switzerland had to play with ten men after the 81st minute. Spain then faced Italy on 6 July in London, losing 4–2 on penalties to them (again after a 1–1 draw). The team finished the tournament with two wins and four draws (including two penalty shootouts), ranking third overall. Among the individual accolades of Spanish players, Pedri was named into the Team of the Tournament by the UEFA.

After years of struggle, Spain made an undeniable breakthrough, reaching the last four of a major tournament for the first time since 2012. later That same year they managed to reach the 2021 UEFA Nations League Final In the final, Spain lost against France 1–2. As such, Spain came agonizingly close to winning both continental tournaments in 2021, but ultimately fell short. Despite this streak of improvement, Spain's performances were heavily criticized by fans and the media, mostly due to the team struggling to score, its mediocre performances against statistically weaker teams, and the over-reliance on FC Barcelona-inspired tactics (namely using short-passes). Furthermore, the near-constant exclusion of certain players, namely from Real Madrid, was underlined.

=== 2022 World Cup ===
Spain started the 2022 World Cup with a 7–0 win over Costa Rica, then they drew 1–1 against Germany and lost 2–1 against Japan, in which they finished second in Group E. In the round of 16, they lost to Morocco 3–0 in a penalty shootout after a goalless draw, which was their third consecutive elimination from a major tournament on penalties. As with the 2021 Euros, Spain's performance was criticized throughout the 2022 World Cup,

Shortly after the 2022 World Cup, Luis Enrique was sacked from the head coaching position, eventually being replaced by Luis De La Fuente, who had successfully coached Spanish youth teams throughout the 2010s.

=== 2023 Nations League win ===
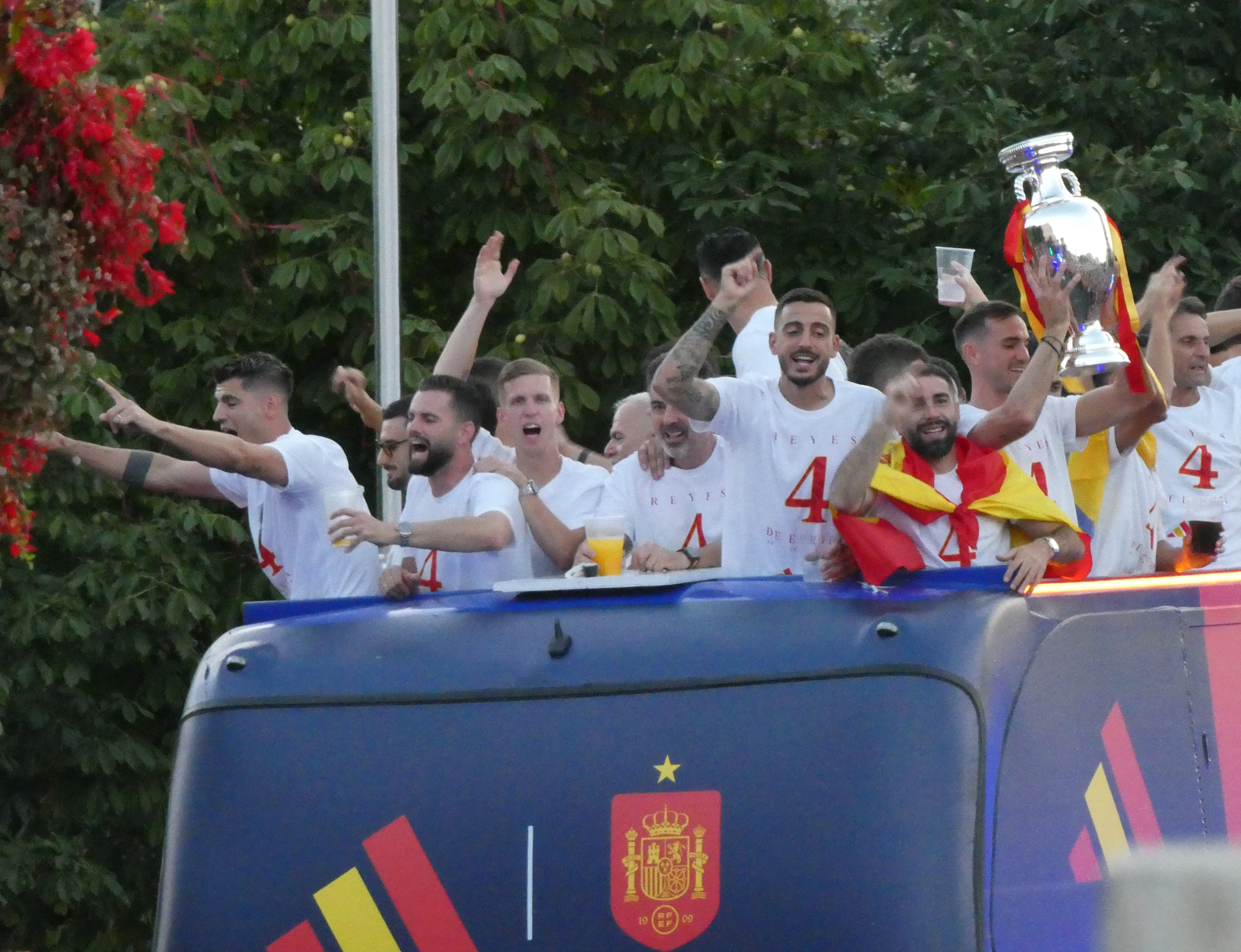
Spain players celebrating their record fourth European Championship title in Madrid, Spain.

Spain was in a group with the Czech Republic, Portugal, and Switzerland. They finished top of their group with 11 points to advance to the finals. They played Italy in the semifinals, who they beat 2-1 with a late Joselu winner. They played Croatia in the final, who they defeated on penalties to win their first Nations League title.

=== UEFA Euro 2024: Back to European glory ===
Spain finished top of their group in UEFA Euro 2024 without conceding a goal after defeating Croatia, Italy and Albania, and went on to defeat Georgia in the round of 16 4–1. They eventually eliminated hosts Germany in the quarter-finals with a 2–1 win and defeated France in the semi-finals with the same result, qualifying for their fifth European Championship final and setting a new record of six consecutive matches undefeated in European Championships. Spain would go on to defeat England in the final 2-1 and clinch their record-breaking fourth European title, becoming the first and only team to win all seven matches in a single tournament. They also set a new record of 15 goals scored in a single European Championship. Spain's performance during this European Championship led to some dubbing this as the start of a new "golden era" for Spanish football, pointing at the young age of its new team.

=== 2025 UEFA Nations League ===
Spain continued its undefeated strike through the 2025 UEFA Nations League, classifying as first of its group to the finals and then defeating the Netherlands in the penalty shoot-out to make it to the semifinals, becoming the only nation to have been present in three of the four Nations League finals. Following their victory 5-4 over France in the semifinals, the team faced Portugal for their second consecutive and overall UEFA Nations League title. This became Spain's third consecutive appearance in a Nations League final, only missing the inaugural season. Some commentators drew similarities to Spain's previous "golden age". With their victory over France, Spain remained undefeated in 23 official matches, their second all-time record just behind their largest one, their last defeat at an official match being against Scotland in March 2023.

=== 2026 FIFA World Cup ===
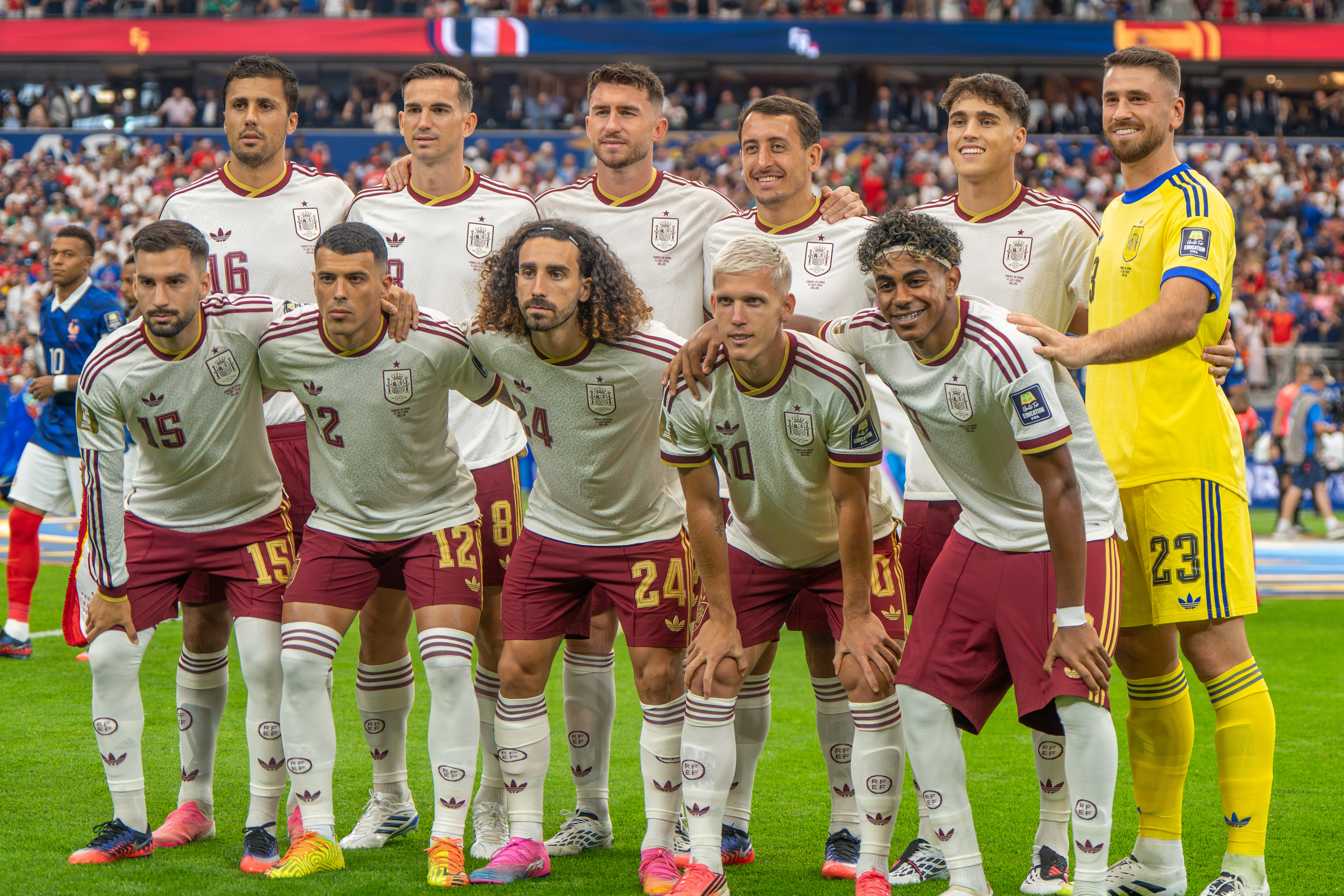
Spain starting lineup against France in the semi-final.

Spain qualified for the 2026 FIFA World Cup after topping his group, winning 5 matches and drawing one. Placed in Group H, they started the tournament drawing against Cape Verde 0–0 in what was considered a shocking result, as this was Cape Verde's first appearance in the World Cup. Their victories against Saudi Arabia 4–0 and against Uruguay 1–0 secured the first place for them, advancing to the knockout stage having kept a clean sheet.

In the round of 32, Spain defeated Austria 3–0, and thanks to another clean sheet, Spain's goalkeeper Unai Simón achieved a world record by equaling Walter Zenga's record of five consecutive clean sheets set in 1990, reaching a total of 519 minutes without conceding, two minutes more than the previous benchmark, a record later extended following Spain's 0–1 victory against Portugal in the round of 16, reaching a total of 609 minutes and six clean sheets, becoming the only team up to that point not to concede a single goal. Spain's victory against Portugal matched the country's previous record of 35th consecutive undefeated streak, having last lost against Colombia in a friendly match in March 2024. Spain's progression to the quarterfinals was the first such a feat since the country's first and only World Cup title in 2010. Their victory over Belgium 2–1 became only the second time that the country moved past the quarterfinals into a World Cup semifinal. Spain achieved a 2–0 victory over France in the semi-finals, securing their second World Cup final in their history and tying with Italy for the longest undefeated streak in men's international football, having played 37 consecutive matches between 2024 and 2026 without a loss in regulation time. Spain would then win the final, played for the first time in East Rutherford, New Jersey, 1–0, after extra time thanks to a goal by Ferran Torres, denying the defending champion team from 2022, Argentina, its second consecutive championship, extending its record unbeaten run in regulation time to 38, becoming the first national team to hold the men’s and women’s World Cup titles simultaneously, and becoming the first nation to win the title more than once in the 21st century.

== Previous squads ==
FIFA World Cup squads

- 2026 FIFA World Cup squad
- 2022 FIFA World Cup squad
- 2018 FIFA World Cup squad
- 2014 FIFA World Cup squad
- 2010 FIFA World Cup squad
- 2006 FIFA World Cup squad
- 2002 FIFA World Cup squad
- 1998 FIFA World Cup squad
- 1994 FIFA World Cup squad
- 1990 FIFA World Cup squad
- 1986 FIFA World Cup squad
- 1982 FIFA World Cup squad
- 1978 FIFA World Cup squad
- 1966 FIFA World Cup squad
- 1962 FIFA World Cup squad
- 1950 FIFA World Cup squad
- 1934 FIFA World Cup squad

UEFA European Championship squads

- UEFA Euro 2024 squad
- UEFA Euro 2020 squad
- UEFA Euro 2016 squad
- UEFA Euro 2012 squad
- UEFA Euro 2008 squad
- UEFA Euro 2004 squad
- UEFA Euro 2000 squad
- UEFA Euro 1996 squad
- UEFA Euro 1988 squad
- UEFA Euro 1984 squad
- UEFA Euro 1980 squad
- 1964 European Nations' Cup squad

FIFA Confederations Cup squads

- 2013 FIFA Confederations Cup squad
- 2009 FIFA Confederations Cup squad

UEFA Nations League Finals squads

- 2025 UEFA Nations League Finals squad
- 2023 UEFA Nations League Finals squad
- 2021 UEFA Nations League Finals squad
