= Germán Echevarría =

Spanish footballer

Personal information
- Full name: Germán Echevarría Usaola
- Birth name: Germán Etxebarria Usaola
- Date of birth: 1 December 1896
- Place of birth: Bilbao, Biscay, Spain
- Date of death: 2 January 1984 (aged 87)
- Position: Forward

Senior career*
Years	Team	Apps	(Gls)
1913–1926	Athletic Club		

International career
1915	Basque Country	2	(0)
- * Club domestic league appearances and goals

Germán Echevarría Usaola (1 December 1896 – 2 January 1984), also known as Maneras, was a Spanish footballer who played as a forward for Athletic Club. He spent all 13 seasons of his playing career with Athletic Bilbao, thus being a historical member of the club in the 1910s and part of the so-called one-club men group. Naturally, he was also the second player in the history of the club to reach one hundred official matches for them, the first being Domingo Acedo. He played a pivotal role in helping the Basque club reach six Copa del Rey finals and winning five of them, including three back-to-back titles between 1914 and 1916.

== Club career ==
Born in Bilbao, Echevarría began his career at his hometown club Athletic Club during the 1913–14 season, and he quickly became one of the club's benchmarks at the time, netting twice on his debut against Club Deportivo Bilbao on 23 November 1913. Echevarría was part of the legendary attacking front that Athletic had in the 1910s, which also included Severino Zuazo, Domingo Acedo, Félix Zubizarreta and Pichichi, and together with them he won the first edition of the regional North/Biscay championship in 1913–14, hence qualifying to the 1914 Copa del Rey which they also won thus completing the double (regional championship and Copa del Rey), which was the first of three successive doubles. In the 1915 final Echevarría netted once in a 5–0 win over RCD Español, and he also started in the 1916 final where he helped his side to a 4–0 win over Real Madrid CF (then known as Madrid FC).

Echevarría also played a pivotal role in helping Athletic reach a further three Copa del Rey finals in 1920, 1921 and 1923, winning the latter two. He captained Athletic in the 1920 final against FC Barcelona, and as such, he was the one who stepped up to take a penalty awarded to his team, which he coolly converted, but the referee Enrique Bertrán annulled the goal alleging that Echevarría had shot before he gave the order to do it, and as a result, they lost 0–2.

He stayed loyal to the club until his retirement in 1926, playing over one hundred official matches (107), which was a remarkable achievement in a time when not as many games were played. He was only the second player in the history of the club after Domingo Acedo to reach one hundred official matches for Athletic.

== International career ==
Like most Athletic Club players of that time, he played several matches for the Basque Country national team, and in May 1915, he was a member of the Basque side that won the first edition of the Prince of Asturias Cup, an inter-regional competition organized by the RFEF. In the decisive game against a Castile/Madrid XI, Echevarría helped Basque grab a 1–1 draw that proved enough for the Basques to win the cup for the first (and only) time in their history. Almost inexplicably, Echevarría never earned an international cap for the Spanish national team.

== Honours ==
=== Club ===
Athletic Club

- Copa del Rey:
  - Champions (5): 1914, 1915, 1916, 1921, 1923
  - Runner-up: 1920.
- North/Biscay Regional Championship (8): 1913–14, 1914–15, 1915–16, 1919–20, 1920–21, 1922–23, 1923–24, 1925–26

=== International ===
Basque Country

- Prince of Asturias Cup:
  - Champions (1) 1915
