= 1916 Copa del Rey final =

- Event: 1916 Copa del Rey
Athletic Bilbao	Madrid FC
4	0
- Date: May 7, 1916
- Venue: Camp de la Indústria, Barcelona
- Referee: (Spain) Francisco Bru
- Attendance: 6,000

The 1916 Copa del Rey final was the 16th final of the Spanish cup competition, the Copa del Rey. The final was played at Camp de la Indústria in Barcelona on 7 May 1916. The match was won by Athletic Bilbao, who beat Madrid FC 4–0. The star of the match was Félix Zubizarreta, who scored a hat-trick to help Athletic to a 4–0 win. He became only the second player to score a hat-trick in the final after teammate Pichichi, who had done it in the previous final against Espanyol.

== Details ==
7 May 1916
16:00 CET

Athletic Bilbao	4–0	Madrid FC
Acedo 12'; Zubizarreta 23', 60', 69'

Camp de la Indústria, Barcelona
Attendance: 6,000
Referee: (Spain) Francisco Bru

Athletic Bilbao	Madrid FC

GK	1	(Spain) Cecilio Ibarreche
DF	2	(Spain) Luis María Solaun
DF	3	(Spain) Hurtado
MF	4	(Spain) Esteban Eguía
MF	5	(Spain) José María Belauste
MF	6	(Spain) José Cabieces
FW	7	(Spain) Germán Echevarría
FW	8	(Spain) Pichichi
FW	9	(Spain) Félix Zubizarreta
FW	10	(Spain) Luis Iceta (c)
FW	11	(Spain) Domingo Acedo
Manager:
(England) Billy Barnes

GK	1	(Spain) (Philippines) Eduardo Teus
DF	2	(Spain) José Antonio Erice
DF	3	(Spain) José Irureta (c)
MF	4	(Spain) Eulogio Aranguren
MF	5	(France) René Petit
MF	6	(Spain) José María Castell
FW	7	(Spain) Gomar
FW	8	(Spain) Luis Belaunde
FW	9	(Spain) Santiago Bernabéu
FW	10	(France) Juan José Petit
FW	11	(Spain) Sotero Aranguren
Manager:
(Ireland) Arthur Johnson

Copa del Rey
1916 winners
Athletic Bilbao
7th title

== See also ==
- El Viejo Clásico
