= Belauste =

Belauste is a Spanish surname. Notable people with the surname include:

- José María Belauste (1889–1964), Spanish footballer
- Benigno Belauste (1879–?), Spanish footballer
- Francisco Belauste (1897–1981), Spanish footballer
- Ramón Belauste (1891–1981), Spanish footballer
