= 1915 Copa del Rey final =

- Event: 1915 Copa del Rey
Athletic Bilbao	RCD Español
5	0
- Date: 2 May 1915
- Venue: Estadio de Amute, Irun
- Man of the Match: Pichichi
- Referee: (England) Walter Hermann
- Attendance: 5,000

The 1915 Copa del Rey final was the 15th final of the Spanish cup competition, the Copa del Rey. The final was played at Estadio de Amute in Irun on 2 May 1915. The match was won by Athletic Bilbao, who beat RCD Español 5–0. The star of the match was Athletic's Pichichi, who scored a hat-trick to help his side clutch a 5–0 win.

== Match details ==
2 May 1915
16:30

Athletic Bilbao	5–0	RCD Español
Pichichi 4' (pen.), 43', 60'; Zubizarreta 69'; Echevarría 70'	Report1; Report2

Estadio de Amute, Irun
Attendance: 5,000
Referee: (England) Walter Hermann

Athletic Bilbao	RCD Español

GK	1	(Spain) Cecilio Ibarreche
DF	2	(Spain) Luis María Solaun
DF	3	(Spain) Luis Hurtado
MF	4	(Spain) José Cabieces
MF	5	(Spain) José María Belauste
MF	6	(Spain) José Mestraitua
FW	7	(Spain) Germán Echevarría
FW	8	(Spain) Pichichi
FW	9	(Spain) Félix Zubizarreta
FW	10	(Spain) Luis Iceta (c)
FW	11	(Spain) Ramón Belauste
Manager:
(England) Billy Barnes

GK	1	(Spain) Pedro Gilbert
DF	2	(Spain) Pakán
DF	3	(Spain) Santiago Massana (c)
MF	4	(Spain) Manuel Lemmel
MF	5	(Spain) Félix de Pomés
MF	6	(Spain) Juanico Torres
FW	7	(Spain) Felipe Janer
FW	8	(Spain) Paco Bru
FW	9	(Spain) Juan López
FW	10	(Spain) José María Usobiaga
FW	11	(Spain) Emilio Sampere
Manager:
(Spain) José García Hardoy

Copa del Rey
1915 winners
Athletic Bilbao
6th title
