= José María Laca =

Spanish footballer

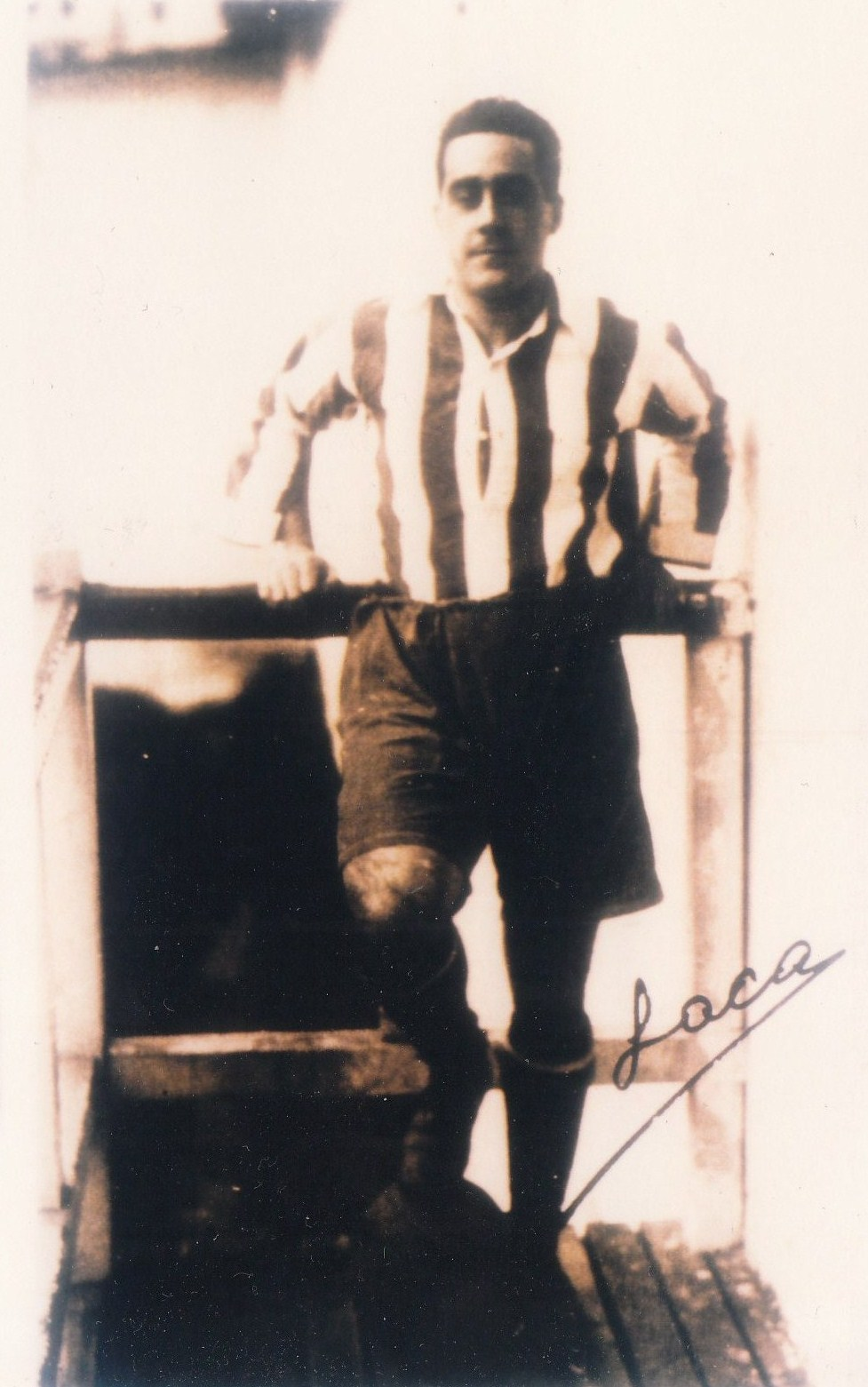

Personal information
- Full name: José María Martín Laca Salcedo
- Date of birth: 11 November 1898
- Place of birth: Bilbao, Biscay, Spain
- Date of death: 22 September 1977 (aged 78)
- Position: Midfielder

Senior career*
| Years | Team | Apps | (Gls) |
| 1916–1926 | Athletic Club | | |

International career
| 1923–1924 | Vizcaya | 2 | (1) |
| 1924 | Spain | 1 | (0) |
- * Club domestic league appearances and goals

José María Martín Laca Salcedo (11 November 1898 – 22 September 1977) was a Spanish footballer who played primarily as a midfielder. Laca spent his entire 10-year career with Athletic Bilbao, and thus be part of the so-called one-club men group. Laca also earned one cap for the Spain national team in 1924.

== Club career ==
Laca began his career at Athletic Club, and he quickly became one of the club's benchmarks at the time. Together with the likes of Domingo Acedo, José María Belauste and Pichichi, he helped the club win five regional North/Biscay championships and reach three Copa del Rey finals in 1920, 1921 and 1923, winning the latter two. In the 1921 final, he netted twice in a 4–1 win over Athletic Madrid to help Bilbao win the first meeting between the 'two Athletics'.

== International career ==
With Athletic playing in the local league, he was summoned to play for the Biscay national team, and was a member of the team that participated in the 1923–24 Prince of Asturias Cup, an inter-regional competition organized by the RFEF. In the quarter-finals against Asturias on 18 November 1923, Laca scored a goal to help his side to a 4–2 win, thus reaching the semi-finals where they were eliminated by Catalonia 0–1 due to a goal from Cristóbal Martí.

Laca earned his only international cap for the Spain national team on 9 March 1924, in a friendly against Italy which ended in a 0–0 draw.

=== International goals ===
Biscay's team score listed first, column indicates score after each Laca goal.

List of international goals scored by José María Laca
| No. | Date | Venue | Opponent | Score | Result | Competition |
|---|---|---|---|---|---|---|
| 1 | 18 November 1923 | San Mamés, Bilbao, Spain | Asturias | 2–1 | 4–2 | 1923–24 Prince of Asturias Cup quarter-final |

== Honours ==
=== Club ===
Athletic Club

- Copa del Rey (2): 1921, 1923; runner-up: 1920.
- North/Biscay Regional Championship (5): 1919–20, 1920–21, 1922–23, 1923–24, 1925–26
