= 1921 Copa del Rey final =

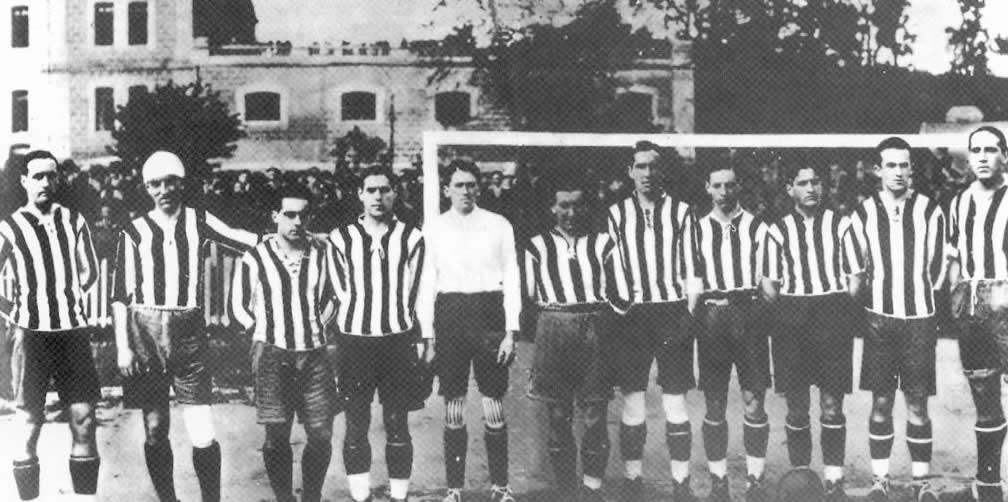
- Athletic Bilbao, champions
- Event: 1921 Copa del Rey
Athletic de Bilbao	Athletic de Madrid
4	1
- Date: 8 May 1921
- Venue: San Mamés, Bilbao
- Referee: (Spain) José Berraondo

The 1921 Copa del Rey final was the 21st final of the Spanish cup competition, the Copa del Rey. The final was played at San Mamés, in Bilbao, on 8 May 1921. Athletic Bilbao beat Athletic Madrid 4–1 courtesy of two braces from José María Laca and Domingo Acedo, a victory that assured their eighth domestic cup title.

The match was the first meeting between the 'two Athletics' who had begun as the same club, with the parent in Bilbao and the subsidiary in Madrid. The clubs had been growing apart, and after this match, they formally split, one of the main reasons being the Athletic Madrid president Julián Ruete having agreed with Athletic Bilbao's request to move the final from its original venue in Seville to Bilbao (due to bad feeling over the manner in which Sevilla FC had been disqualified to the Basques' benefit), which Athletic Madrid fans saw as an unnecessary deference.

It was Athletic Madrid's first final in the competition after they unexpectedly, but convincingly defeated Real Unión in the semi-finals. It was also the last match played by Athletic Bilbao's well-known forward Pichichi, who retired soon afterwards and died the following year.

== Match details ==
8 May 1921
17:30 CET

Athletic Bilbao	4–1	Athletic Madrid
Laca 29', 73'; Acedo 41' (pen.), 68'	Report	38' Triana

San Mamés, Bilbao
Attendance: 15,000
Referee: (Spain) José Berraondo

Athletic Bilbao	Athletic Madrid

GK	1	(Spain) Francisco Rivero
DF	2	(Spain) Luis Beguiristain
DF	3	(Spain) Luis Hurtado
MF	4	(Spain) Francisco Belauste
MF	5	(Spain) José María Belauste
MF	6	(Spain) Sabino Bilbao
FW	7	(Spain) Villavaso
FW	8	(Spain) Pichichi
FW	9	(Spain) Antón Allende
FW	10	(Spain) José María Laca
FW	11	(Spain) Domingo Acedo
Manager:
(England) Billy Barnes

GK	1	(Spain) Francisco Durán
DF	2	(Spain) Ramón Olalquiaga
DF	3	(Spain) Pololo
MF	4	(Spain) Francisco Martínez
MF	5	(Spain) Desiderio Fajardo
MF	6	(Spain) Jesús Olarreaga
FW	7	(Spain) Ramón Amann
FW	8	(Spain) Andrés Tuduri
FW	9	(Spain) Monchín Triana
FW	10	(Spain) Ángel del Río
FW	11	(Spain) Luis Olaso
Manager:
(England) Vince Hayes

Copa del Rey
1921 winners
Athletic Bilbao
Eighth title

== See also ==
Same finalists:

- 1956 Copa del Generalísimo Final
- 1985 Copa del Rey Final
- 2012 UEFA Europa League Final
