= Luis Hurtado (Spanish footballer) =

Spanish footballer

Personal information
- Full name: Luis José Emilio Hurtado Gaminde
- Date of birth: 6 April 1892
- Place of birth: Bilbao, Spain
- Date of death: Unknown
- Position: Defender

Senior career*
Years	Team	Apps	(Gls)
1908–1924	Athletic Bilbao		

International career
1915-1922	Basque Country		
Medal record
Basque Country
Prince of Asturias Cup
Gold medal – first place	1915 Prince of Asturias Cup	Team
- * Club domestic league appearances and goals

Luis José Emilio Hurtado Gaminde (6 April 1892 - Unknown) was a Spanish footballer who played as a defender. He spent all 16 seasons of his career with Athletic Bilbao, thus being a historical member of the club and part of the so-called one-club men group. He played a pivotal role in helping the Basque club reach eight Copa del Reys finals, of which he played in seven (missed the 1911 Copa del Rey Final) and won five, including three in a row between 1914 and 1916, which makes him one of the players with the best record of the competition. Although history seems to have blurred the legend of Hurtado, he was one of the most important footballers in the amateur beginnings of Athletic Club.

== Club career ==
Born in Bilbao, he began his career at local club Athletic Bilbao, making his debut on 6 December 1908 in a friendly against Club Ciclista de San Sebastián at the Lamiako Stadium. He was one of the eleven footballers that started for Athletic in the first-ever match played at San Mamésn on 21 August 1913, in a friendly against Racing de Irun. In that game he played alongside Luis María Solaun, with whom he would form a high-level defensive duo for the next four years, and this partnership was crucial in Athletic's three back-to-back Copa del Rey titles between 1914 and 1916, conceding only one goal in those three finals, which came in the 1914 final as a 88th consolation goal to España FC in a 2–1 win. In total, he played in seven Copa del Reys finals (1910, 1913, 1914, 1915, 1916, 1920 and 1921), winning 5 of them (lost in 1913 and 1920) for a total of 6 titles (he also won the 1911 edition although he did not play in the final), which makes him one of the players with the best record of the competition.

His last meeting with the club was on 30 September 1923, in a friendly against FC Barcelona at Les Corts. Therefore, according to the club's historical archive, he is the third longest-serving footballer in the club (18 seasons) only behind Piru Gainza and José María Belauste and tied with José Ángel Iribar.

== International career ==
Like many other Athletic Bilbao players of that time, he played several matches for the 'North' / Basque Country representative team, and in May 1915, he was a member of the team that won the first edition of the Prince of Asturias Cup, an inter-regional competition organized by the RFEF. With the Basque side he formed a great defensive partnership with Irún's Manuel Carrasco, conceding just one goal in the whole tournament to Santiago Bernabéu in a 1–1 draw with a Castille/Madrid XI, a draw that was enough for the Basques to win the cup for the first time.

== Honours ==
=== Club ===
Athletic Bilbao

- North Regional Championship:
  - Champions (7): 1913–14, 1914–15, 1915–16, 1919–20, 1920–21, 1922–23 and 1923–24
- Copa del Rey:
  - Champions (6): 1910, 1911, 1914, 1915, 1916 and 1921
  - Runner-up (2): 1913 and 1920

=== International ===
Basque Country XI

- Prince of Asturias Cup:
  - Champions (1):1915
