= Aquilino Acedo =

Spanish footballer (1896–1964)

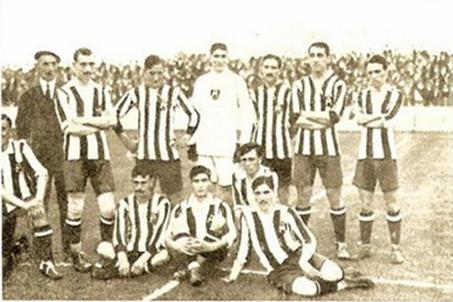
- Acedo on 21 August 1913

Personal information
- Full name: Aquilino Gómez-Acedo Villanueva
- Date of birth: 11 January 1896
- Place of birth: Bilbao, Biscay, Spain
- Date of death: 9 July 1964 (aged 68)
- Place of death: Bilbao, Biscay, Spain
- Position: Forward

Senior career*
Years	Team	Apps	(Gls)
1912–1913	Athletic Bilbao		
- * Club domestic league appearances and goals

Aquilino Gómez-Acedo Villanueva (11 January 1896 – 9 July 1964) was a Spanish footballer who played as a forward for Athletic Bilbao. He is the younger brother of Txomin Acedo, a historic Athletic Club player between 1914 and 1929.

== Biography ==
Aquilino Gómez-Acedo was born in Bilbao on 11 January 1896, as the son of Isidro Gómez Acedo Moreno (1864–) and Serafina Villanueva Ortiz (1869–).

In total, he played three competitive matches for Athletic Club during the 1912–13 and 1913–14 seasons, making his debut on 17 March 1913, at the age of 17, in the semifinals of the 1913 Copa del Rey, in which Athletic won 3–0 against Real Madrid, and then he featured in the final on 23 March in which Athletic lost 0–1 to Racing de Irún, the courtesy of a goal from Manuel Retegui.

Unlike his younger brother, he participated in the inaugural match of the San Mamés stadium, on 21 August 1913, in which he assisted Pichichi to the first goal in the history of the cathedral. Due to a serious knee injury, he had to give up football. His participation in the inaugural match at San Mamés earned him the club's Gold and Diamond Medal.

Acedo died on 9 July 1964, at the age of 68.

== Honours ==
Athletic Club

- Biscay Championship:
  - Winners (1): 1914
- Copa del Rey:
  - Winners (1): 1913
