= Félix Zubizarreta =

Spanish footballer (1894–1943)

Personal information
- Full name: Félix Zubizarreta Ezpeleta
- Date of birth: 3 May 1894
- Place of birth: Bilbao, Biscay, Spain
- Date of death: 1943 (aged 49)
- Place of death: Caracas, Venezuela
- Position: Forward

Senior career*
Years	Team	Apps	(Gls)
1913–1917	Athletic Club	29	(27)
- * Club domestic league appearances and goals

Félix Zubizarreta Ezpeleta was a Spanish footballer who was an outstanding striker for Athletic Club between 1913 and 1917. Even though he had a short footballing career, Zubizarreta managed to leave a considerable footprint in Spanish football, playing a pivotal role in Athletic's three Copa del Rey titles in a row between 1914 and 1916, in which he netted a goal in the 1915 final and a hat-trick in the 1916 final against Madrid FC (now known as Real Madrid).

His family emigrated to Venezuela after the Spanish Civil War. His grandson Iker Zubizarreta played in the football tournament at the 1980 Summer Olympics.

== Biography ==
Born in Bilbao, Zubizarreta began his career at his hometown club Athletic Club during the 1913–14 season, and quickly became one of the club's standout players at the time, scoring five goals on his debut in a 12–0 win over Sporting de Irún, thus becoming the first-ever player to score five goals in an official match with the Basque team, in addition to achieving the first-ever hat-trick at the San Mamés Stadium, which had been inaugurated five months earlier.

Zubizarreta was part of the legendary attacking front that Athletic boosted in the 1910s, which also included Severino Zuazo, Domingo Acedo and Pichichi, and together with them he helped the club win the very first edition of the regional North/Biscay championship in 1913–14, hence qualifying to the 1914 Copa del Rey which they also won, although he did not feature in the final. In the 1915 Copa del Rey, Zubizarreta netted a hat-trick in the second leg of the semi-finals Fortuna de Vigo to help Athletic reach the final in which he netted once in a 5–0 win over RCD Español. However, his career highlight came in the 1916 Copa del Rey Final where he netted a hat-trick against Real Madrid CF (then known as Madrid FC) to help his side secure a 4–0 victory and the club's third cup title in a row, while individually he became the second player to score a hat-trick in the final after teammate Pichichi, who had done it in the previous final against Español.

On 1 January 1917, just a few months after the 1916 Cup final, Athletic welcomed Madrid FC in their first-ever visit to the San Mamés Stadium, but this time Zubizarreta had a bad performance, and although he had got a hat-trick for a title, the public of San Mamés did not forgive his performance and kept booing him (in those days the fans were not light-handed when it came to criticizing the footballers), and so, in the second half, when Athletic was already playing with 10 men due to Luis Hurtado's injury, Zubizarreta, given the increasing boos towards him, decided to leave the field with around 15 minutes remaining. "He left bitter and disgusted by the attitude of a public that always censors, systematically his work, be it good or bad...”. Zubizarreta did not play any more matches with Athletic or with another team, retiring from football on that evening at the age of just 23, having scored 27 goals in 29 official matches for Athletic. So Madrid's first match in San Mamés was Zubizarreta's last.

He dedicated himself to his studies and his name only came up again 20 years later during the Spanish Civil War when he was appointed head of the Basque Government's enlistment and recruitment section. Due to his position and his nationalist significance, Zubizarreta went into exile in Venezuela with his wife, Juanita Torre, and his nine children. He set up a wood business in Caracas and died there at the age of 49. The other members of the family returned to the Basque Country.

== Honours ==
Athletic Club

- North/Biscay Regional Championship:
  - Champions (3): 1913–14, 1914–15 and 1915–16
- Copa del Rey:
  - Champions (3): 1914, 1915 and 1916
