= Esteban Eguía =

Spanish footballer

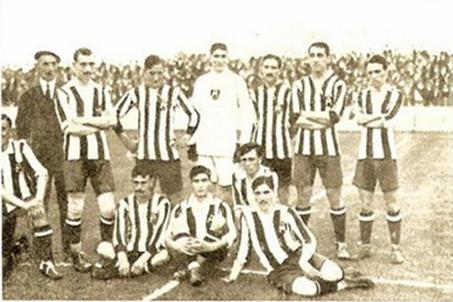
- Eguía on 21 August 1913

Personal information
- Full name: Esteban Eguía Hormaechea
- Date of birth: 2 May 1890
- Place of birth: Getxo, Biscay, Spain
- Date of death: 20 May 1934 (aged 44)
- Place of death: Getxo, Biscay, Spain
- Position: Forward

Senior career*
Years	Team	Apps	(Gls)
1911–1912	Bilbao FC		
1912–1918	Athletic Bilbao		
- * Club domestic league appearances and goals

Esteban Eguía Hormaechea (2 May 1890 – 20 May 1934) was a Spanish footballer who played as a forward for Athletic Bilbao, winning three consecutive Copa del Rey titles between 1914 and 1916.

== Biography ==
Born in Getxo, Eguía began playing football with his hometown club Bilbao FC, where he featured alongside future teammate Pichichi. Both of them then joined Athletic Club, with Eguía making his debut on 17 March 1913, in the semifinals of the 1913 Copa del Rey. Athletic won 3–0 against Real Madrid, and then he featured in the final on 23 March in which Athletic lost 0–1 to Racing de Irún. He went on to play in Athletic's three consecutive Copa del Rey titles between 1914 and 1916, starting in two finals, helping his side to a 2–1 victory over FC Espanya in 1914, and then to a 4–0 trashing of Madrid FC in 1916.

Eguía also participated in the inaugural match of the San Mamés stadium, on 21 August 1913, in which he assisted Pichichi to the first goal in the history of the cathedral. Eguía retired in 1918, at the age of 28, having played 42 official matches, which was a very high number for the amateur era.

Professionally, Eguía was a carpenter, being a strict worker who disarmed his opponents with the same care he showed in carpentry. He died on 20 May 1934, at the age of 44.

== Honours ==
Athletic Club

- Biscay Championship:
  - Winners (1): 1914, 1915, and 1916
- Copa del Rey:
  - Runner-up (1): 1913
  - Winners (3): 1914, 1915, and 1916
