= Francisco Belauste =

Spanish footballer

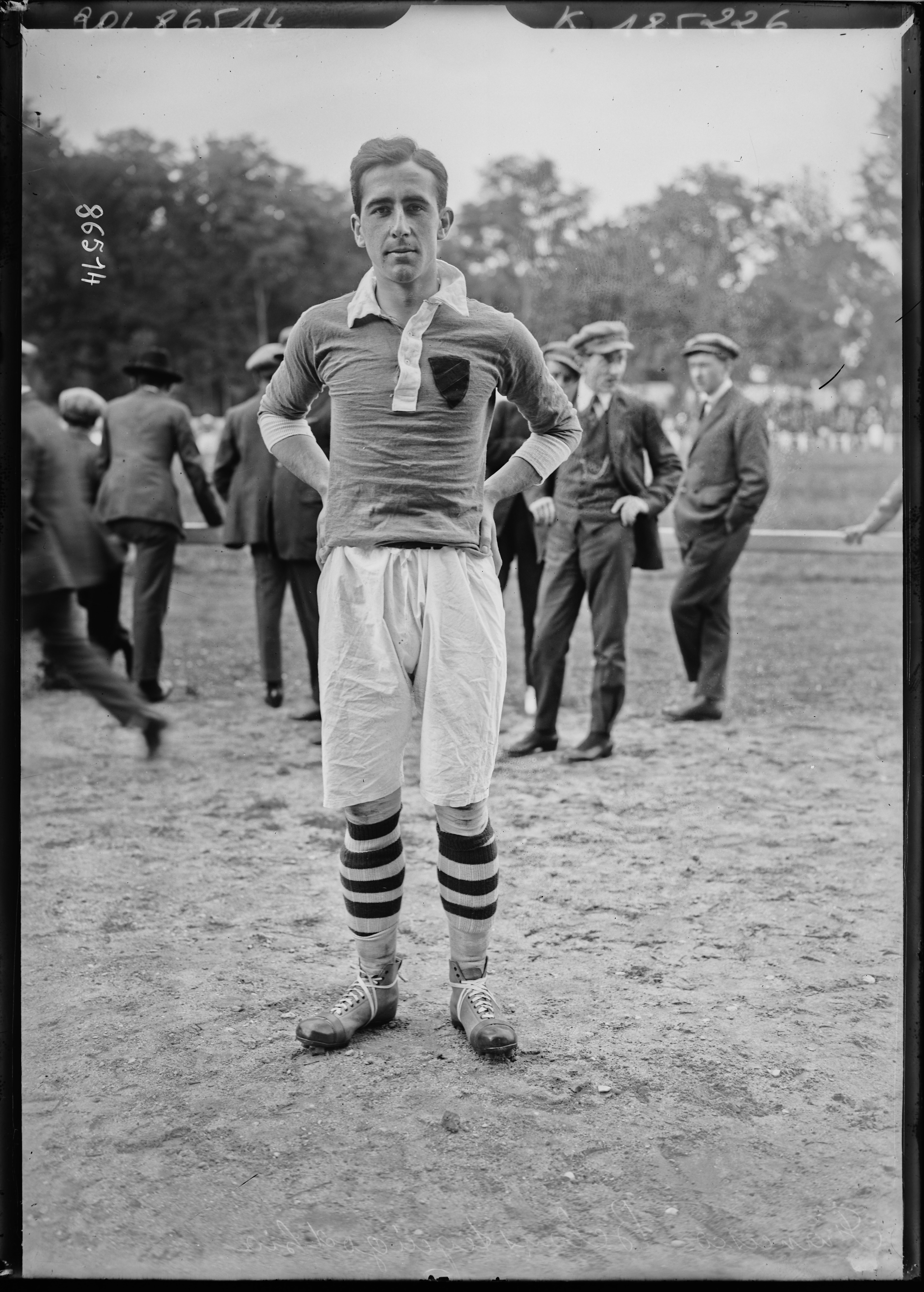
- Francisco Belaustegigoitia in 1923

Personal information
- Full name: Francisco Belausteguigoitia Landaluce
- Date of birth: 3 September 1897
- Place of birth: Bilbao, Biscay, Spain
- Date of death: 26 April 1981 (aged 83)
- Place of death: Madrid, Spain
- Position: Midfielder

Senior career*
Years	Team	Apps	(Gls)
1916–1918	Athletic Madrid		
1918–1922	Athletic Bilbao		
- * Club domestic league appearances and goals

Francisco Belausteguigoitia Landaluce (3 September 1897 - 26 April 1981), nicknamed Pacho and also known as Belauste III, was a Spanish footballer who played as a midfielder. His brothers, José María and Ramón, were also footballers. His great-granddaughter, Bibiane Schulze, also is a footballer who represented the Athletic Club women's team.

== Club career ==
Born to a wealthy family that was native to Llodio, Ramón was the ninth of the twelve children (eight men and four women) of the marriage formed by Federico and Dolores. In his family there were several football players such as José María (1889), Santiago (1890) and Ramón (1891), who also played for Athletic Bilbao. He began his career at Atlético Madrid, before joining Athletic Bilbao in 1918. He played alongside his brother, José María, in two Copa del Rey finals in 1920 and 1921, winning the latter after beating his former club Atlético (4–1).

== Honours ==
=== Club ===
Athletic Bilbao

North Regional Championship:

- Champions (2): 1919–20 and 1920–21

Copa del Rey:

- Champions (1): 1921
- Runner-up (1): 1920
