= 1913 Copa del Rey final =

There were two Copa del Rey finals played in 1913:

- 1913 Copa del Rey final (UECF), Barcelona 4–3 (aggregate) Real Sociedad
- 1913 Copa del Rey final (FECF), Racing de Irún 3–2 (aggregate) Athletic Bilbao
