= 1913 FECF Copa del Rey final =

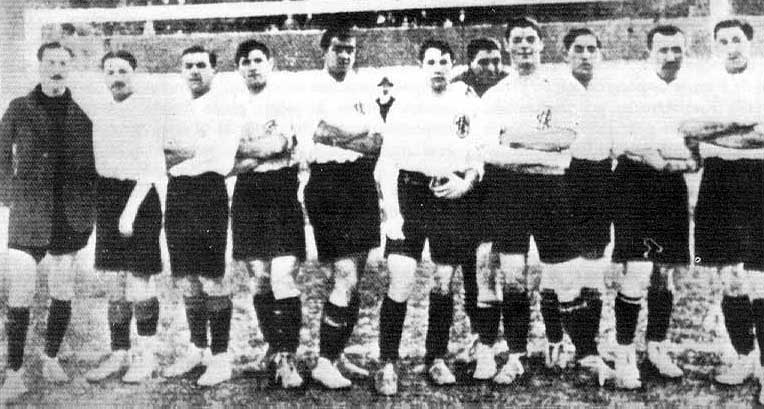
- Racing de Irún, champions
- Event: 1913 Copa del Rey
Racing de Irún	Athletic Bilbao
3	2

Final
Racing de Irún	Athletic Bilbao
2	2
- After extra time
- Date: 22 March 1913
- Venue: Estadio O'Donnell, Madrid
- Referee: (Spain) Santiago Rodríguez

Replay
Racing de Irún	Athletic Bilbao
1	0
- Date: 23 March 1913
- Venue: Estadio O'Donnell, Madrid
- Referee: (Spain) Manuel Prast

The 1913 Copa del Rey final (FECF) was the 13th final of the Spanish cup competition, the Copa del Rey. The final was played at Estadio O'Donnell in Madrid on 22 March 1913. The match ended in a 2–2 draw, after extra-time, forcing a replay that was played the next day, which saw Racing de Irún beat Athletic Bilbao 1-0, with a goal from Manuel Retegui.

== Match details ==
=== Final ===
22 March 1913

Racing de Irún	2–2 (a.e.t.)	Athletic Bilbao
Patricio 10'; Retegui 20'	Report1; Report2	Pichichi 30'; Belauste II 47'

Estadio O'Donnell, Madrid
Referee: (Spain) Santiago Rodríguez

Racing de Irún	Athletic Bilbao

GK	1	(Spain) Juan Ayestarán
DF	2	(Spain) Manuel Carrasco
DF	3	(Spain) Manuel Arocena
MF	4	(Spain) Gonzalo Boada
MF	5	(Spain) Izaguirre
MF	6	(Spain) José Rodríguez
FW	7	(Spain) San Bartolomé
FW	8	(Spain) José María Iñarra
FW	9	(Spain) Patricio Arabolaza
FW	10	(Spain) Manuel Retegui
FW	11	(Spain) Ignacio Arabolaza

GK	1	(Spain) Cecilio Ibarreche
DF	2	(Spain) Luis Hurtado
DF	3	(Spain) Luis María Solaun
MF	4	(Spain) Esteban Eguía
MF	5	(Spain) José María Belauste (c)
MF	6	(Spain) Luis Iceta
FW	7	(Spain) Ramón Belauste
FW	8	(Spain) Severino Zuazo
FW	9	(Spain) Pichichi
FW	10	(Spain) Luis Cortadi
FW	11	(Spain) Luis Pinillos

=== Replay ===
23 March 1913
15:30 (EST)

Racing de Irún	1–0	Athletic Bilbao
Retegui 70'	Report1; Report2

Estadio O'Donnell, Madrid
Referee: (Spain) Manuel Prast

Racing de Irún	Athletic Bilbao

GK	1	(Spain) Juan Ayestarán
DF	2	(Spain) Manuel Carrasco
DF	3	(Spain) Manuel Arocena
MF	4	(Spain) Gonzalo Boada
MF	5	(Spain) Izaguirre
MF	6	(Spain) Félix Echart
FW	7	(Spain) San Bartolomé
FW	8	(Spain) José María Iñarra
FW	9	(Spain) Patricio Arabolaza
FW	10	(Spain) Manuel Retegui
FW	11	(Spain) Ignacio Arabolaza

GK	1	(Spain) Cecilio Ibarreche
DF	2	(Spain) Luis Hurtado
DF	3	(Spain) Luis María Solaun
MF	4	(Spain) Esteban Eguía
MF	5	(Spain) José María Belauste (c)
MF	6	(Spain) Luis Iceta
FW	7	(Spain) Aquilino Acedo
FW	8	(Spain) Severino Zuazo
FW	9	(Spain) Pichichi
FW	10	(Spain) Luis Cortadi
FW	11	(Spain) Luis Pinillos

== See also ==
- 1910 FECF Copa del Rey final
- 1913 UECF Copa del Rey Final
- Basque football derbies
