= Pichichi =

Pichichi may refer to

- Pichichi (footballer) (Rafael Moreno Aranzadi, 1892–1922), Spanish footballer
- Pichichi Trophy, a Spanish football award
