= Luis Beguiristain =

Spanish footballer (1896–?)

Personal information
- Full name: Luis Beguiristain Echeverría
- Date of birth: 22 December 1896
- Place of birth: Bilbao, Biscay, Spain
- Position: Defender

Senior career*
Years	Team	Apps	(Gls)
1914–1917	Athletic Club de Madrid		
1920–1924	Athletic Bilbao		
1924–	Real Sociedad		

International career
1915	Centro (Madrid)	2	(0)
- * Club domestic league appearances and goals

Luis Beguiristain Echeverría (22 December 1896 – unknown) was a Spanish footballer who played as a defender.

== Club career ==
Born in Bilbao, he moved to Madrid as a child, where he began his career in 1914 with Athletic Madrid, with whom he played for three years. He also played for his hometown club Athletic Bilbao, making his debut on 12 August 1920 in a 3–2 friendly victory over Barcelona, but only made his competitive debut on 3 April 1921 in a Copa del Rey match against Sporting de Gijón at the San Mamés. He then helped the club reach the 1921 final, in which he started in a 4–1 win over his former club Athletic Madrid. He also helped the club win two North Regional Championships in 1920–21 and 1922–23. He then joined Real Sociedad, where he finished his career.

== International career ==
Being a player of Athletic Madrid, he was eligible to play for the 'Centro' regional team and in May 1915, he was a member of the side that participated in the first edition of the Prince of Asturias Cup, an inter-regional competition organized by the RFEF. He played in both games against Catalonia and the North team (a Basque Country XI).

== Honours ==
Athletic Bilbao

- Biscay Championship: 1920–21, 1922–23
- Copa del Rey: 1921
