= Juan López (footballer, born 1892) =

Spanish footballer

Personal information
- Full name: Juan López Turró
- Date of birth: 9 May 1892
- Place of birth: Barcelona, Spain
- Date of death: Unknown
- Position: Forward

Youth career
- 1905–1919: Espanyol

Senior career*
Years	Team	Apps	(Gls)
1909–1917	Espanyol		
1917–1918	Universitary SC		
1918–1922	Espanyol		
1922	FC Santboià		

International career
1915–1918	Catalonia	8	(0)
Medal record
Catalonia
Prince of Asturias Cup
Gold medal – first place	1916 Prince of Asturias Cup	Team
- * Club domestic league appearances and goals

Juan López Turró (9 May 1892 in Barcelona – unknown) was a Spanish footballer who played as a forward. Short and thin, he stood out for his effective play, having little formality to put the ball in the back of the net. His best years were in the second half of the 1910s, where he was an undisputed starter at Espanyol and a regular with the Catalan national team.

== Club career ==
Born in Barcelona, he began to play football at the youth ranks of Espanyol in 1905, reaching the first team in 1909, where he played for 8 seasons, featuring alongside Ricardo Zamora in his last season at the club, and being pivotal in helping Espanyol reach the 1915 Copa del Rey Final, which they lost 0-5 to Athletic Bilbao. He then joined Universitary SC in 1917, with whom he played for just one year, returning to Espanyol at the end of the season in 1918, for whom he played until 1922.

He rarely went to the playing field unless there was a game, meaning he almost never trained, which wasn't uncommon in those times, but despite that, he became one of the most emblematic players of his time.

== International career ==
Being a Espanyol player, he was summoned to play for the Catalonia national team several times, and in May 1916, he was a member of the Catalan team that won the second edition of the Prince of Asturias Cup in 1916, an inter-regional competition organized by the RFEF.

== Honours ==
=== Club ===
Espanyol

Copa del Rey:

- Runner-up (1): 1915

=== International ===
Catalonia

Prince of Asturias Cup:

- Champions (1): 1916
