= Ramón Belauste =

Spanish footballer

Personal information
- Full name: Ramón Belausteguigoitia Landaluce
- Date of birth: 27 October 1891
- Place of birth: Llodio, Basque Country, Spain
- Date of death: 1 January 1981 (aged 89)
- Place of death: Madrid, Spain
- Position: Forward

Senior career*
Years	Team	Apps	(Gls)
1910–1922	Athletic Bilbao		

International career
1915-1916	Basque Country		
Medal record
Basque Country
Prince of Asturias Cup
Gold medal – first place	1915 Prince of Asturias Cup	Team
- * Club domestic league appearances and goals

Ramón Belausteguigoitia Landaluce (27 October 1891 - 1 January 1981), also known as Belauste II, was a Spanish footballer who played as a forward. He spent all of his playing career with Athletic Bilbao, thus being a historical member of the club and part of the so-called one-club men group. He played a pivotal role in the club's three back-to-back Copa del Rey titles between 1914 and 1916. His brother, José María Belauste, was also a footballer.

== Club career ==
Born to a wealthy family that was native to Llodio, Ramón was the ninth of the twelve children (eight men and four women) of the marriage formed by Federico and Dolores. In his family there were several football players such as José María (1889), Santiago (1890) and Francisco "Pacho" (1897), who also played for Athletic Bilbao. He developed his entire football career at Athletic Club, a team he joined in 1910. However, his competitive debut only took place on 22 March 1913, in the 1913 Copa del Rey Final against Racing de Irun, and it was Ramón who scored a late equalizer that forced a replay which the Irundarras won 1–0. On 19 October, he scored the first two competitive goals at the San Mamés Stadium in a Vizcaya Regional Championship match against Arenas Club (2-0). He played alongside his brother, José María, in two Copa del Rey finals in 1914 and 1915, both ending in victories. During this stage, he combined football with his work as a lawyer in a Bilbao Law firm, and although the club claims his spell lasted until 1922, there are no records that he played any other game after the 1915 final, in fact, Ramón went to London to study and work as a correspondent for the newspaper El Sol.

== International career ==
Like many other Athletic Bilbao players of that time, he played several matches for the Basque Country national team, and in May 1915, he was a member of the team that won the first edition of the Prince of Asturias Cup, an inter-regional competition organized by the RFEF.

== Honours ==
=== Club ===
Athletic Bilbao

North Regional Championship:

- Champions (2): 1913–14 and 1914–15

Copa del Rey:

- Champions (2): 1914 and 1915
- Runner-up (1): 1913
