= Luis Iceta =

Spanish footballer

Personal information
- Full name: Luis Iceta Zubiaur
- Date of birth: 21 August 1890
- Place of birth: Bilbao, Spain
- Date of death: 24 January 1966 (aged 75)
- Position: Midfielder

Senior career*
Years	Team	Apps	(Gls)
1910–1916	Athletic Club		
- * Club domestic league appearances and goals

Luis Iceta Zubiaur (21 August 1890 – 24 January 1966) was a Spanish footballer who played as a midfielder for Athletic Bilbao. He is an important player in the early history of the club, where he spent the entirety of his playing career and played a pivotal role as Athletic reached five Copa del Reys finals, of which he played in three and was captain in two.

He later co-directed three matches for Spain between 1950 and 1951.

== Biography ==
The son of a family of merchants, Iceta studied in England to continue working in the family business. He used his knowledge of English to act as interpreter between the players and the coach, Englishman Billy Barnes, who changed his position from striker to midfielder. He participated in two historic matches: as team captain in 1910 on the first occasion Athletic wore the white-and-red shirt, and on the opening of the San Mamés stadium in 1913, in a friendly against Racing de Irun.

In total, Iceta played 41 games over seven seasons, including the final of the 1910 Copa del Rey, in which the 20-year-old Iceta started as a forward in an 1–0 victory over Vasconia. He then started in two consecutive finals in 1914 and 1915, both as captain, helping his side to a 2–1 victory over España FC and then a 5–0 victory over RCD Español.

In 1951, together with Paulino Alcántara and Félix Quesada, Iceta was a national selector in three matches, winning one and drawing two.

Iceta died on 24 January 1966, at the age of 76. He is the great-uncle of Miquel Iceta, a politician who was the Spanish Government's Minister of Culture and Sport between 2021 and 2023.

== Honours ==
Athletic Club

- Copa del Rey:
  - Winners: 1910, 1911, 1914, 1915, 1916
