= Domingo Acedo =

Spanish footballer

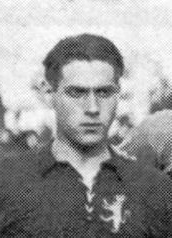
- Acedo with the Spanish Olympic team, 1920

Personal information
- Full name: Domingo Gómez-Acedo y Villanueva
- Date of birth: 6 June 1898
- Place of birth: Bilbao, Spain
- Date of death: 14 September 1980 (aged 82)
- Place of death: Getxo, Spain
- Position: Forward

Youth career
- Barcelona
- 1913–1914: Athletic Bilbao

Senior career*
Years	Team	Apps	(Gls)
1914–1929	Athletic Bilbao	0	(0)

International career
1920–1924	Spain	11	(1)
1922–1924	Vizcaya	2	(1)
Medal record
Men's football
Representing Spain
Olympic Games
Silver medal – second place	1920 Antwerp	Team Competition
- * Club domestic league appearances and goals

Domingo Gómez-Acedo y Villanueva (6 June 1898 – 14 September 1980), also known as Txomin Acedo, was a Spanish footballer who played primarily as a left-sided forward and sometimes as a left back. Acedo was in the Spain national team that competed in the 1920 Summer Olympics, and won the silver medal.

== Club career ==
Acedo spent his entire career with Athletic Bilbao, they won four national Copa del Rey competitions, he scoring once in the 1916 Final and twice in the 1921 Final. They also won eight regional North/Biscay Championships in a 14-year spell playing alongside José María Belauste, Sabino Bilbao and Pichichi for club and country. His primary attributes were his great pace and set-piece abilities, including scoring 'Olympic goals' (direct from a corner kick).

He is the youngest player and goalscorer in the history of Athletic, having made his debut – and scored – in the Campeonato Regional Norte on 18 October 1914, at the age of 16 years, four months and 12 days. He had not been registered officially as a player with Athletic for the requisite six months, and the club were sanctioned by the federation. His records have sometimes been overlooked and the feats attributed incorrectly to Agustín Gaínza (and subsequently to Iker Muniain).

Acedo is also the club's youngest player and scorer in the Copa del Rey having found the net on his debut in that competition on 25 April 1915, aged 16 years, 10 months and 19 days (neither Muniain nor Gainza played in the cup before turning 17).

== International career ==
On 28 August 1920, Otero was among national team history as one of the eleven footballers who played in the first game of the Spain national team for the 1920 Summer Olympics, in an eventual 1–0 victory over Denmark. He featured in three more games at the tournament, scoring the winning goal against Sweden and starting in the play-off for the silver medal against the Netherlands, which Spain won 3–1. In total, he earned 11 caps for Spain between 1920 and 1924, scoring 1 goal.

With Athletic playing in the local league, he was summoned to play for the Biscay autonomous football team, and was a member of the team that participated in the 1922–23 Prince of Asturias Cup, an inter-regional competition organized by the RFEF. In the quarter-finals against Asturias on 13 November 1922, Acedo imprinted his name in the competition's history with an late equaliser in extra-time to level the scores at 2–2 and force a second extra period in which Asturas prevailed as 4–3 winners.

=== International goals ===
Acedo's team score listed first, column indicates score after his goal.

==== Spain ====
No.	Date	Venue	Opponent	Score	Result	Competition
1	1 September 1920	Broodstraat, Antwerp, Belgium	Sweden	2–1	2–1	1920 Summer Olympics

==== Biscay ====
No.	Date	Venue	Opponent	Score	Result	Competition
1	13 November 1922	El Molinón, Gijón, Spain	Asturias	2–2	3–4	1922–23 Prince of Asturias Cup quarter-final replay

== Personal life ==
Domingo Acedo's older brother Aquilino also played for Athletic Bilbao just prior to his younger sibling's debut; in his brief career he featured in the 1913 Cup final defeat to Racing Irun, and in the inaugural match at San Mamés stadium against the same opposition (now renamed Real Unión), before retiring through injury.

A sister of the family, María Mercedes Acedo, married the journalist Manuel Aznar Zubigaray. They were the grandparents of José María Aznar, Prime Minister of Spain in the 1990s.

== Honours ==
=== Club ===
Athletic Bilbao

- Spanish Cup: 1915, 1916, 1921, 1923; runner-up: 1920.
- North/Biscay Regional Championship (8): 1914–15, 1915–16, 1919–20, 1920–21, 1922–23, 1923–24, 1926–27, 1928–29

=== International ===
Spain

- Olympic Games Silver medal: 1920
