= 1920 Copa del Rey =

20th Copa del Rey

Tournament details
- Country: Spain

Final positions
- Champions: FC Barcelona (4th title)
- Runners-up: Athletic Bilbao

Tournament statistics
- Matches played: 9
- Goals scored: 27 (3 per match)

The Copa del Rey 1920 was the 20th staging of the Copa del Rey, the Spanish football cup competition.

The competition started in March 1920 and concluded on May 2, 1920, with the Final, held at El Molinón in Gijón, in which FC Barcelona lifted the trophy for the fourth time with a 2–0 victory over Athletic Bilbao.

== Teams ==
- Biscay Region: Athletic Bilbao
- Gipuzkoa Region: Real Unión
- Centre Region: Madrid FC
- South Region: Sevilla FC
- Galicia Region: Real Vigo Sporting
- Asturias Region: Sporting de Gijón
- Catalonia Region: FC Barcelona

== Quarterfinals ==
=== First leg ===
28 March 1920

Madrid FC	1–1	Athletic Bilbao
Monjardín 45'	Report	Belauste I 10'

Madrid
Referee: (Spain) Paco Bru

28 March 1920

Sporting de Gijón	0–0	Real Vigo Sporting
	Report

Gijón
Referee: (Spain) Enrique Peris

=== Second leg ===
4 April 1920

Athletic Bilbao	4–1	Madrid FC
Laca 7' (pen.), 30', 40'; Echevarría 50'	Report	Paco 20'

San Mamés Stadium, Bilbao
Referee: (Spain) José Torrens

Athletic Bilbao qualified for the semifinals.

4 April 1920

Real Vigo Sporting	4–1	Sporting de Gijón
Dimas 7'; Moncho Gil 30'; Enrique Álvarez 40', 50'	Report	Bernabéu 20'

Campo de Coia, Vigo
Referee: (Spain) Enrique Peris

Real Vigo qualified for the semifinals.

Byes: Real Unión, FC Barcelona (drawn against Sevilla FC, who withdrew after their proposal to play both legs in Madrid was rejected).

== Semifinals ==
=== First leg ===
28 March 1920

Real Unión	0–1	FC Barcelona
	Report	Alcántara 5'

Estadio de Amute, Irun
Referee: (Spain) Federico Larrañaga

11 April 1920

Athletic Bilbao	2–1	Real Vigo Sporting
Echevarría 64'; Belauste I 90'	Report	Moncho Gil 50'

San Mamés Stadium, Bilbao
Referee: (Spain) Bertrán de Lis

=== Second leg ===
4 April 1920

FC Barcelona	4–4	Real Unión
Vinyals 5' (pen.), 70' (pen.); Sesúmaga 8'; Alcántara 40'	Report	Jáuregui 17'; Azurza 75'; Emery 80'; René Petit 85'

Camp de la Indústria, Barcelona
Referee: (Spain) Federico Larrañaga

FC Barcelona qualified for the final.

18 April 1920

Real Vigo Sporting	0–1	Athletic Bilbao
	Report	Belauste I 41'

Campo de Coia, Vigo
Referee: (Spain) Paco Bru

Athletic Bilbao qualified for the final.

== Final ==
2 May 1920

FC Barcelona	2–0	Athletic Bilbao
Martínez 70'; Alcántara 80'	Report

El Molinón, Gijón
Attendance: 10,000
Referee: (Spain) Bertrán de Lis

Copa del Rey 1920 winners
FC Barcelona
4th title
