= Jacobo Torres =

Spanish footballer

Personal information
- Full name: Jacobo Torres Martínez
- Date of birth: 1898
- Place of birth: Vigo, Galicia, Spain
- Date of death: Unknown
- Position: Midfielder

Senior career*
Years	Team	Apps	(Gls)
1914–1923	Fortuna de Vigo		
1923–1925	Celta de Vigo		

International career
1922–1923	Galicia		
Medal record
Men's football
Spain
Olympic Games
Silver medal – second place	1920 Antwerp	Team competition
Galicia
Prince of Asturias Cup
Silver medal – second place	1922-23 Prince of Asturias Cup	Team
- * Club domestic league appearances and goals

Jacobo Torres Martínez (1898 in Vigo) was a Spanish footballer who played as a midfielder for Celta de Vigo. He was part of the first-ever team fielded by Celta de Vigo in 1923.

== Club career ==
Born in Vigo, he spent most of his career at his hometown club Fortuna de Vigo, playing for them until it was merged with Real Vigo Sporting in 1923, to form Celta de Vigo. Torres played in the last match that was held between these two rivals on 11 March 1923, which the fortunistas lost 0–1. The presentation match of Celta de Vigo was held at Coia on 16 September 1923, in a meeting between an A and a B team formed with the players from the club, taking advantage of the large team available that they had, and Torres was one of the 11 footballers that lined-up for the A team. On 10 April 1924, he played a friendly match for Celta against the Uruguay national team that would go on to win the 1924 Summer Olympics in Paris. He won two back-to-back Galician Championships with Celta in 1923–24 and 1924–25 before retiring at the end of that same season.

== International career ==
Being a player of Fortuna de Vigo, he was summoned to play for the Galicia national team several times, and he was a member of the team that reached the final of the 1922–23 Prince of Asturias Cup, an inter-regional competition organized by the RFEF.

== Honours ==
=== Club ===
Fortuna de Vigo

Galician Championship:

- Winners (3) 1914–15, 1920–21 and 1921–22

Celta de Vigo

Galician Championship:

- Winners (2) 1923–24 and 1924–25

=== International ===
Galicia

Prince of Asturias Cup:

- Runner-up (1): 1922–23
