= Estadio de Amute =

Football stadium in Irún, Spain

- Interactive map of Estadio de Amute
- Location: Irún, Spain
- Owner: Real Unión
- Surface: Grass

Construction
- Opened: 1910
- Closed: 1926

Amute Stadium (Estadio de Amute in Spanish) was the football stadium of Real Unión, a main team in Spanish football before the Second World War. The club was formed in 1915 following the merger of Irún Sporting Club and Racing Club de Irún. Irún Sporting Club played at the Campo de Amute, which was situated just to the north of town in the village of Hondarribia, not far from the current site of Hondarribia's airport.

The ground opened on 2 January 1910 and hosted the 1915 Copa del Rey Final when Athletic Bilbao defeated RCD Español with 5-0.

Upon forming, Real Unión used Irún Sporting’s Campo de Amute. In 1926, at the peak of their powers, Real Unión moved to the other side of Irun and their current Stadium Gal. It was inaugurated 19 September with a match against FC Barcelona.

There was a strong Anglo influence at the club in the early years, with England great Steve Bloomer, managing the club for several years in the 1920s. The original structure could have easily passed itself off as an English, that was until the local municipality installed a cycle track in 1950. The Anglo influence may be the reason the title “stadium” is used rather than estadio or campo. That or a Basque refusal to use castellano.
