= 1915 Copa del Rey =

15th Copa del Rey

Tournament details
- Country: Spain
- Teams: 4

Final positions
- Champions: Athletic Bilbao (6th title)
- Runners-up: RCD Español

Tournament statistics
- Matches played: 5
- Goals scored: 16 (3.2 per match)

The Copa del Rey 1915 was the 15th staging of the Copa del Rey, the Spanish football cup competition.

The competition started on 15 April 1915 and concluded on 2 May 1915, with the final, held at the Estadio de Amute in Irun, in which Athletic Bilbao lifted the trophy for the sixth time ever with a resounding 5–0 victory over RCD Español, with a hat-trick from the great Pichichi.

== Teams ==
- North Region: Athletic Bilbao
- Centre Region: Sociedad Gimnástica
- Galicia Region: Fortuna de Vigo
- Catalonia Region: RCD Español

== Semifinals ==
=== First leg ===
18 April 1915

| Fortuna de Vigo | 0–0 | Athletic Bilbao |

Campo de Coia, Vigo
Referee: (Spain) Carlos Dieste

11 April 1915

| Sociedad Gimnástica | 2–3 | RCD Español |
|---|---|---|
| Ricardo Uribarri 25'; Escudero 60' | Report | Darío Somoza 20' (o.g.); Pakán 40'; Juan López 60' |

Estadio de Diego de León, Madrid
Referee: (Spain) Julián Ruete

=== Second leg ===
25 April 1915

| Athletic Bilbao | 5–1 | Fortuna de Vigo |
|---|---|---|
| Domingo Acedo 35'; Félix Zubizarreta 44', 60', 70'; Dimas Fernández 80' (o.g.) | Report | Jacobo Torres 65' |

San Mamés Stadium, Bilbao
Referee: (Spain) Carlos Dieste

Athletic won 5–1 on aggregate

19 April 1915

| RCD Español | 3–0 | Sociedad Gimnástica |
|---|---|---|
| Felipe Janer 2'; Juan López 20', 60' | Report |

Camp de la Calle Muntaner, Barcelona
Referee: (Spain) Francisco Doménech

RCD Español 6–2 on aggregate

== Final ==
2 May 1915
16:30

| Athletic Bilbao | 5–0 | RCD Español |
|---|---|---|
| Pichichi 4' (pen.), 43', 60'; Félix Zubizarreta 69'; Germán Echevarría 70' | Report |

Amute, Irun
Attendance: 5,000
Referee: (England) Walter Hermann

Copa del Rey 1915 winners
Athletic Bilbao
6th title
