= 1921 Copa del Rey =

21st Copa del Rey

Tournament details
- Country: Spain
- Teams: 8

Final positions
- Champions: Athletic Bilbao (8th title)
- Runners-up: Athletic Madrid

Tournament statistics
- Matches played: 12
- Goals scored: 50 (4.17 per match)

The Copa del Rey 1921 was the 21st staging of the Copa del Rey, the Spanish football cup competition.

The competition started on 9 April 1921, and concluded on 8 May 1921, with the Final, held at the San Mamés in Bilbao, in which Athletic Bilbao lifted the trophy for the eighth time with a 4–1 victory over Athletic Madrid thanks to two braces from José María Laca and Domingo Acedo.

== Teams ==
- Biscay Region: Athletic de Bilbao
- Gipuzkoa Region: Real Unión
- Centre Region: Athletic Madrid
- South Region: Sevilla FC
- Galicia Region: Fortuna Vigo
- Asturias Region: Sporting de Gijón
- Catalonia Region: FC Barcelona
- Levante Region: Levante de Murcia

== Quarterfinals ==
FC Barcelona withdrew in protest after the Spanish Federation moved the final to Seville: Athletic Madrid, who they had been drawn against, qualified for the semifinals.

=== First leg ===
27 March 1921

| Fortuna Vigo | 5–1 | Real Unión |
|---|---|---|
| Redondela 29', 61'; Posada 33', 80'; Polo 68' | Report | Emery 32' |

Campo de Coia, Vigo
Referee: (Spain) Bertrán de Lis

3 April 1921

| Athletic Bilbao | 2–1 | Sporting Gijón |
|---|---|---|
| Belauste I 8'; Antón Allende 42'; Laca (penalty missed) | Report | Palacios 35' |

San Mamés Stadium, Bilbao
Referee: (Spain) José Berraondo

10 April 1921

| Sevilla FC | 2–0 | Levante de Murcia |
|---|---|---|
| Escobar 30'; Cabeza 88' | Report |

Campo de la Reina Victoria, Sevilla
Referee: (Spain) Bertrán de Lis

=== Second leg ===
3 April 1921

| Real Unión | 3–2 | Fortuna Vigo |
|---|---|---|
| Patricio 8'; Jáuregui 27'; Emery 78' | Report | Redondela 58'; Polo 79' |

Estadio de Amute, Irun
Referee: (Spain) José Berraondo

Fortuna Vigo and Real Unión won one match each. At that year, the goal difference was not taken into account. A replay match was played.

10 April 1921

| Sporting Gijón | 0–1 | Athletic Bilbao |
|---|---|---|
| | Report | Acedo 79' (pen.) |

Gijón
Referee: (Spain) José Bidagor

Athletic Bilbao qualified for the semifinals.

17 April 1921

| Levante de Murcia | 0–3 | Sevilla FC |
|---|---|---|
| | Report | Kinké 20', 40' (pen.); Brand 50' |

Campo La Torre de la Marquesa, Murcia
Referee: (Spain) Ezequiel Montero

Sevilla FC qualified for the semifinals.

=== Replay match ===
10 April 1921

| Real Unión | 4–3 | Fortuna Vigo |
|---|---|---|
| René Petit 30' (pen.); Amantegui 54', 65'; Patricio 85' | Report | Posada 10', 60'; Torres 70' (pen.) |

Madrid
Referee: (Spain) Carlos Dieste

Real Unión qualified for the semifinals.

== Semifinals ==
=== First leg ===
17 April 1921

| Real Unión | 1–2 | Athletic Madrid |
|---|---|---|
| Amantegui 50' | Report | Tuduri 20', 22' |

Estadio de Amute, Irun
Referee: (Spain) Enrique Peris

1 May 1921

| Sevilla FC | 4–2 | Athletic Bilbao |

Madrid
Referee: (Spain)

=== Second leg ===
24 April 1921

| Athletic Madrid | 5–2 | Real Unión |
|---|---|---|
| Olalquiaga 65' (pen.); Triana 80', 86', 88'; Fajardo 82' | Report | Maritorena 2'; Emery 15' (pen.) |

Campo de O'Donnell (Atlético Madrid), Madrid
Referee: (Spain) José Torrens

Athletic Madrid qualified for the final.

2 May 1921

| Athletic Bilbao | 1–1 | Sevilla FC |

Madrid
Referee: (Spain)

Sevilla FC won the semifinals, but was disqualified because of an illegal line-up in quarter-finals. Athletic Bilbao qualified for the final.

== Final ==
8 May 1921
17:30 CET

| Athletic Bilbao | 4–1 | Athletic Madrid |
|---|---|---|
| Laca 29', 73'; Acedo 41' (pen.), 68' | Report | Triana 38' |

San Mamés, Bilbao
Attendance: 15,000
Referee: (Spain) José Berraondo

Copa del Rey 1921 winners
Athletic Bilbao
8th title
