= Sabino Bilbao =

Spanish footballer

Medal record

Men's football

Representing Spain

Olympic Games
Silver medal – second place	1920 Antwerp	Team competition

Sabino Bilbao Líbano (11 December 1897 – 20 January 1983) was a Spanish footballer who played as a midfielder.

== Football career ==
Born in Leioa, Biscay, Sabino played six seasons with Athletic Bilbao (1918–24), prior to the creation of La Liga. With the Basque giants he won two Copa del Rey trophies, in 1921 and 1923.

Sabino earned two caps with Spain, representing the nation in the 1920 Summer Olympics in Antwerp and helping it win silver. His debut came during the tournament in a 2–1 win against Sweden, being immortalized in the annals of Spanish football due to that match: in the play that led to the 1–1 equalizer, José María Belauste, his teammate also at Athletic, reportedly shouted as he requested the pass: "¡A mí el pelotón, Sabino, que los arrollo!" ("Send me that ball, Sabino, i'll crush them!" in Spanish).

Sabino died in Getxo also in his native region on 20 January 1983, at the age of 85.
