= Pichichi (footballer) =

Spanish footballer (1892–1922)

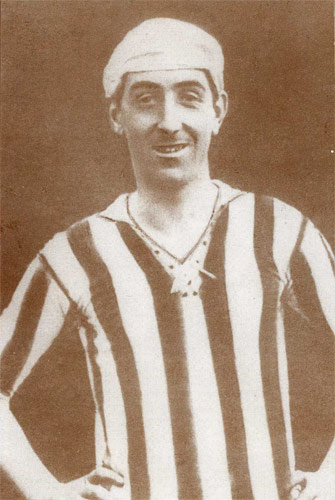

Personal information
- Full name: Rafael Moreno Aranzadi
- Date of birth: 23 May 1892
- Place of birth: Bilbao, Spain
- Date of death: 1 March 1922 (aged 29)
- Place of death: Bilbao, Spain
- Height: 1.73 m (5 ft 8 in)
- Position: Forward

Youth career
- Escolapios

Senior career*
Years	Team	Apps	(Gls)
1910–1911	Bilbao FC		
1911–1922	Athletic Bilbao	89	(83)

International career
1920	Spain	5	(1)
Medal record
Men's football
Representing Spain
Olympic Games
Silver medal – second place	1920 Antwerp	Team competition
- * Club domestic league appearances and goals

Rafael Moreno Aranzadi (23 May 1892 – 1 March 1922), known as Pichichi, was a Spanish footballer who played as a forward. He is known for the Pichichi Trophy named in his honour.

He played for Athletic Bilbao during the 1910s and 1920s. He received his nickname because of his frail build.

== Club career ==
Born in Bilbao, Biscay, Pichichi played in his first Copa del Rey final in March 1913 as Athletic Bilbao, his sole club, lost 1–0 against Racing Club de Irún. Later the same year, on 21 August, the same opponents, now renamed Real Unión, were invited to play the inaugural game at San Mamés Stadium, and he scored the very first goal at the ground; two months later, he also scored the first goal at Real Sociedad's new Atotxa Stadium in the opening fixture for that venue.

Easily identifiable on the pitch due to a white cloth he tied to his head, Pichichi subsequently played in five other domestic cup finals, winning four and netting a hat-trick in the 1915 final as Athletic beat RCD Español 5–0. After returning from the 1920 Olympics, some supporters felt that his performances were no longer measuring up to his 'star' status, and this criticism caused him to abruptly quit playing altogether in order to become a referee.

Pichichi died on 2 March 1922 at age 29 from a sudden attack of typhus, with the grief among the fans at the shock news heightened with regret for the acrimonious manner in which their hero had departed the club. He scored a total of 83 goals in 89 games for his only team.

== International career ==
In 1920, Pichichi was a member of the very first Spain national team that played at the Summer Olympic Games in Belgium. He earned five senior caps in one month, his debut coming on 28 August in a 1–0 win against Denmark. He was the first Spain international footballer to die.

== Personal life ==
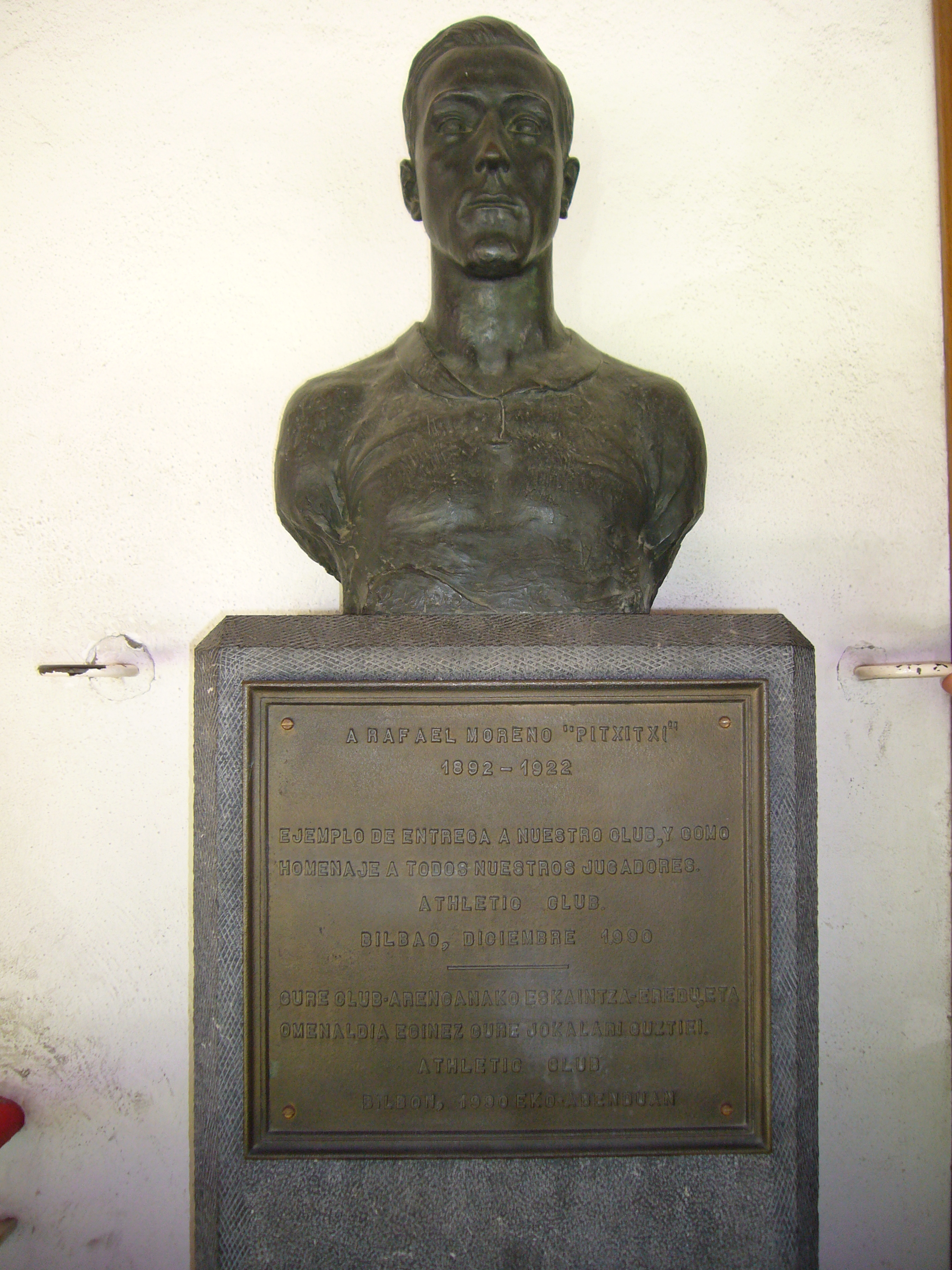
Bust of Pichichi at the San Mamés Stadium

Pichichi's father was mayor of Bilbao, and he was Miguel de Unamuno's nephew. Both he and his future wife were immortalised in a painting by Aurelio Arteta (although it is said that the image originally depicted teammate José María Belauste, and came to be known as a representation of Pichichi and his fiancée following his death).

In 1926, a bust was erected in Pichichi's honour at the San Mamés Stadium. It was tradition for teams visiting the ground for the first time pay homage by leaving a bouquet of flowers at its base. As of 22 October 2025, Qarabağ FK. became the most recent team to do so. Despite concerns that it might not be accommodated at Athletic's new ground, a suitable spot was identified at the entrance to the players' tunnel, allowing the tradition to continue at the new location from 2013 onwards.

In 1953, Spanish sports newspaper Diario Marca introduced the Pichichi Trophy in his honour. It is awarded each year to the top scorers in La Liga and Segunda División.

== Honours ==
Athletic Bilbao

- Copa del Rey: 1914, 1915, 1916, 1921
- Northern/Vizcayan Regional Championship: 1913–14, 1914–15, 1915–16, 1919–20, 1920–21

Spain

- Summer Olympic Games: Silver medal 1920

== See also ==
- List of one-club men
