= José María Belauste =

Spanish footballer (1889–1964)

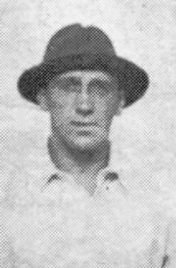
- Belauste in 1920

Personal information
- Full name: José María de Belausteguigoitia Landaluce
- Date of birth: 3 September 1889
- Place of birth: Bilbao, Spain
- Date of death: 4 September 1964 (aged 75)
- Place of death: Mexico City, Mexico
- Position: Midfielder

Senior career*
Years	Team	Apps	(Gls)
1905–1926	Athletic Bilbao		

International career
1920	Spain	3	(1)
- * Club domestic league appearances and goals

Medal record

Men's football

Representing Spain

Olympic Games
Silver medal – second place	1920 Antwerp	Team competition

José María de Belausteguigoitia Landaluce (3 September 1889 – 4 September 1964), known as Belauste, was a Spanish footballer who played as a midfielder.

== Club career ==
Born in Bilbao, Biscay, Belauste played with Athletic Bilbao from the age of 15 to 36. His game was based on a physical display, as he stood at 1.93 meters and weighed 95 kilograms.

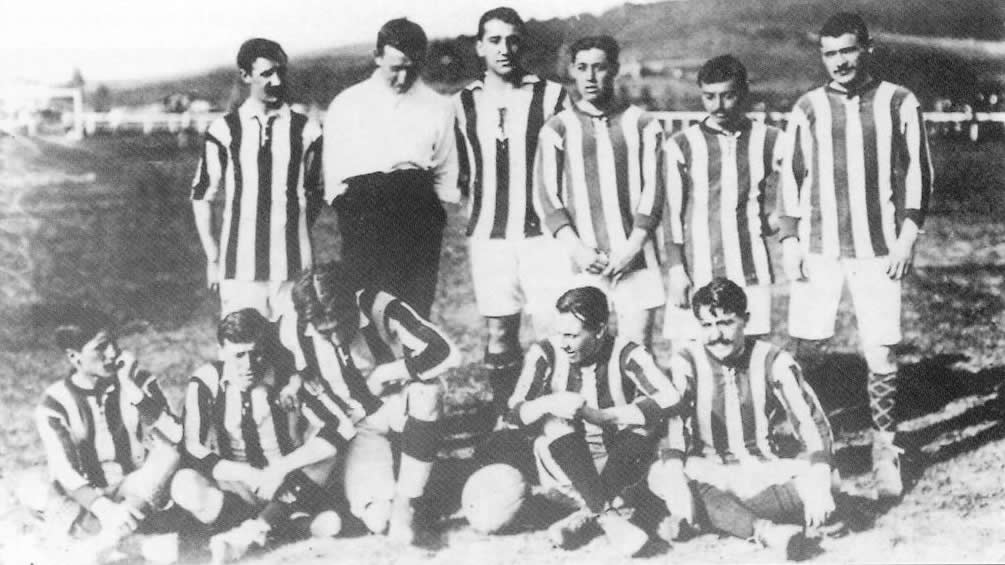
Athletic's team which won the 1911 Copa del Rey (Belauste back row, centre)

He made his debut for his only club on 4 April 1909 in a 2–4 loss against Club Ciclista de San Sebastián, and won six Copa del Rey trophies during his tenure.

== International career ==
Belauste won three caps for Spain, representing the nation at the 1920 Summer Olympics in Belgium and helping it win silver, as captain. His debut came during the tournament in a 1–0 win against Denmark, and in the second game, against Sweden, he was immortalized in the annals of Spanish football: in the play that led to the 1–1 equaliser, he reportedly shouted to teammate Sabino Bilbao "¡A mí el pelotón, Sabino, que los arrollo!" ("Send me that ball, Sabino, I'll crush them!" in Spanish). This was subsequently viewed as the reason why the national team was dubbed Furia Roja (Spanish Fury).

== Personal life ==
Belauste was one of twelve children born to a middle-class family. He majored in law from the University of Deusto while still an active player, and later worked as a lawyer. Two of his brothers played alongside him for Athletic (though not coinciding with one another in official matches): Ramón between 1913 and 1915 – winning the Copa del Rey in 1914 and 1915 – and Patxo between 1919 and 1922, lifting the trophy in 1921 before he moved to Paris to study alongside Marie Curie.

He was a talented athlete who achieved a silver medal in the discus throw event at the 1925 edition of the Spanish Athletics Championships.

Belauste was also active in politics, being affiliated to the Basque Nationalist Party and responsible for its sports section. During a meeting in 1922, he shouted "Death to Spain!"; additionally, he almost did not receive his Olympic medal, due to the fact he refused to carry the Spanish flag in the parade.

After his voluntary exile, first to France, then Algeria, Argentina and Brazil, Belauste returned home, but left for Mexico after the start of the Spanish Civil War. He died on 4 September 1964 in Mexico City at the age of 75, from lung cancer.

== Honours ==
=== Club ===
- Copa del Rey: 1910, 1911, 1914, 1915, 1916, 1921
- Biscay Championship: 1913–14, 1914–15, 1915–16, 1919–20, 1920–21

=== International ===
- Summer Olympic Games: Silver medal 1920
