= Joaquín Rodríguez Eguinoa =

Spanish footballer (1888–1937)

Personal information
- Full name: Joaquín Rodríguez Eguinoa
- Date of birth: 29 July 1888
- Place of birth: Madrid, Spain
- Date of death: 1936 (aged 48-49)
- Place of death: Madrid, Spain
- Position: Forward

Senior career*
Years	Team	Apps	(Gls)
1908–1909	Español de Madrid		
1909–1910	Sociedad Gimnástica		
1910–1911	RCD Espanyol		
1911–1912	Sociedad Gimnástica		
1912–1916	Madrid FC		
- * Club domestic league appearances and goals

Joaquín Rodríguez Eguinoa (29 July 1888 – 1937) was a Spanish footballer who played as a forward for Madrid FC.

== Biography ==
Born in Madrid, Rodríguez Eguinoa began his football career at his hometown club Español de Madrid in 1908, helping his side win its first piece of silverware, the 1908–09 Centro Championship, and then reached the 1909 Copa del Rey final, which they lost 3–1 to Club Ciclista.

His great campaign with Español earned him a move to Sociedad Gimnástica in 1909, which at the time had a great team, captained by the midfielder Sócrates Quintana, and with José Carruana and José Manuel Kindelán teaming up on defense. Eguinoa was a member of the Gimnástica team that won the 1909–10 Centro Championship, and again in 1910–11 and 1913–14, but remained an unused substitute in the 1912 Copa del Rey, in which his side reached the final, which they lost 2–0 to FC Barcelona.

During the 1910–11, Eguinoa had a brief stint in RCD Espanyol, for whom he played five Catalan championship matches, with his debut coming against FC Barcelona. One of those matches was Espanyol's debut in his new stadium Camp del carrer Muntaner, precisely against his former team Español de Madrid.

Rodríguez Eguinoa played with Madrid FC for four years between 1912 and 1916, but he only played a total of seven official matches, six in the regional championship and one in the Copa del Rey. In April 1911, he wrote an article about the failed Copa del Rey played in San Sebastián.

== Death and legacy ==
Rodríguez Eguinoa died in Madrid 1936, at the age of either 48 or 49.

Three of his grandchildren played Union rugby in the Arquitectura de Madrid team, the most prominent being Carlos Rodríguez, who competed internationally on the Spain national team.

== Honours ==
Club Español de Madrid

- Centro Championship: 1908–09

RS Gimnástica

- Centro Championship: 1909–10, 1910–11

Madrid FC

- Campeonato de Madrid: 1915–16
