= Eulogio Uribarri =

Spanish footballer (1894–1972)

Personal information
- Full name: Eulogio Uribarri León
- Date of birth: 10 October 1894
- Place of birth: Sevilla, Spain
- Date of death: 8 March 1972 (aged 77)
- Position: Midfielder

Senior career*
Years	Team	Apps	(Gls)
1910–1915	Sociedad Gimnástica		
1915–1918	Athletic Club de Madrid		

International career
1916	Madrid	1	(0)
Medal record
Madrid
Prince of Asturias Cup
Silver medal – second place	1916 Prince of Asturias Cup	Team
- * Club domestic league appearances and goals

Eulogio Uribarri León (10 October 1894 – 8 March 1972), was a Spanish footballer who played as a midfielder for Sociedad Gimnástica and Athletic Club de Madrid.

== Club career ==
Uribarri began his career with Sociedad Gimnástica in 1911, with whom he played for 4 seasons until 1915, featuring alongside his older brother Ricardo. At the turn of the decade Sociedad Gimnástica, propelled by the likes of the Uribarri brothers, Sócrates Quintana, Kindelán, and José Carruana, began to disrupt the monopoly of Madrid FC and Athletic Madrid, competing head-to-head with them and winning the Centro Championship on four occasions, three of which in a row between 1910 and 1912 and a fourth in 1913–14. He also helped his side to reach the 1912 Copa del Rey Final, in which he started in a 0–2 loss to FC Barcelona. In the semifinals of the 1914 Copa del Rey, Gimnástica faced FC Espanya de Barcelona, whose biggest strength at the time was its defense, but Uribarri managed to score the opening goal of the second leg to level the tie, although in the end Gimnástica still lost courtesy of a late goal from Antonio Baró.

In 1915, most of the Gimnástica joined Athletic Club de Madrid, where he featured alongside the likes of Pagaza and the Villaverde brothers (Fernando and Senén). In 1916, the secretary of Madrid FC Julio Chulilla stated in an interview with a journalist from the magazine Gran Vida that the club had recently acquired "many additions, among them those of Ricardo Álvarez, Eulogio Uribarri and Antonio de Miguel, and some more. Despite this, however, there are no references to Uribarri ever playing for Madrid and he probably retired in 1916.

== International career ==
Like many other Athletic Madrid players of that time, Uribarri was eligible to play for the Madrid national team, being a member of the team that participated in the second edition of the Prince of Asturias Cup in 1916, an inter-regional competition organized by the RFEF. He started in the opening match of the tournament against Catalonia, which ended in a 3–6 loss, a result that cost him his place in the starting eleven as he was then replaced for the second match against Catalonia, which ended in a 2–2 draw.

== Later life ==
In December 1936, during the Spanish Civil War, the board of directors of the National Union of Insurance and Social Security Workers agreed to expel several of its members, including Uribarri and his brother Luis, who had been detained at the Embassy of Finland in Madrid, for considering them traitors to the cause of anti-fascism,

Uribarri died in Madrid on 8 March 1972, at the age of 77.

== Honours ==
=== Club ===
Sociedad Gimnástica

- Centro Championship:
  - Champions (2): 1910–11 and 1913–14
- Copa del Rey:
  - Runner-up (1): 1912

=== International ===
Madrid

- Prince of Asturias Cup:
  - Runner-up (1): 1916
