= 1912 Copa del Rey final =

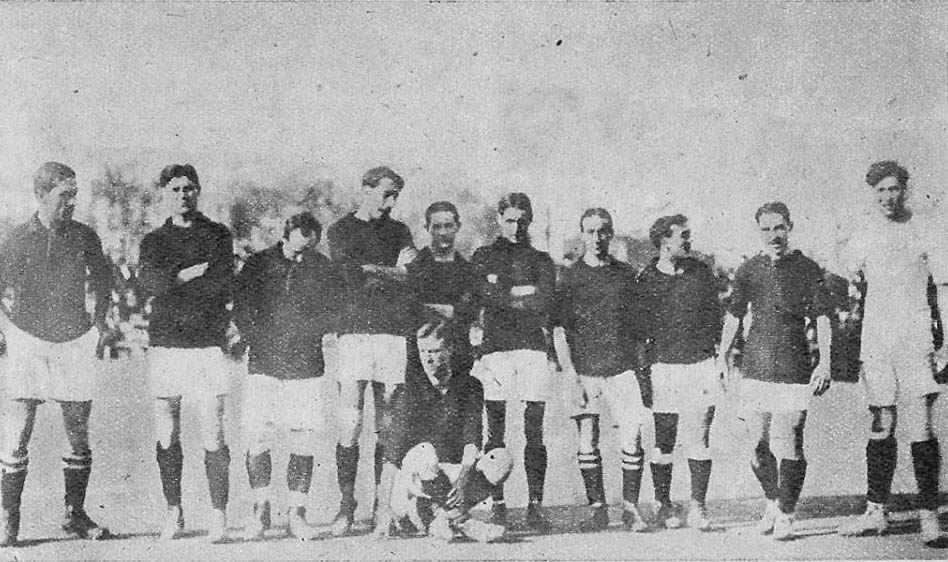
- Event: 1912 Copa del Rey
Barcelona	Sociedad Gimnástica
2	0
- Date: 7 April 1912
- Venue: Camp de la Indústria, Barcelona
- Referee: (England) John Hamilton

The 1912 Copa del Rey final was the 11th final of the Spanish cup competition, the Copa del Rey. The final was played at Camp de la Indústria in Barcelona on 7 April 1912. The match was won by FC Barcelona, who beat Real Sociedad Gimnástica Española from Madrid 2–0, with goals from Alfredo Massana and Pepe Rodríguez.

Out of the 11 players that lined-up for Barcelona in the final, 7 were on the line-up of Catalonia's first official international match on 20 February 1912 against France (Berdié, Massana, Estévez and Pakán being the outsiders).

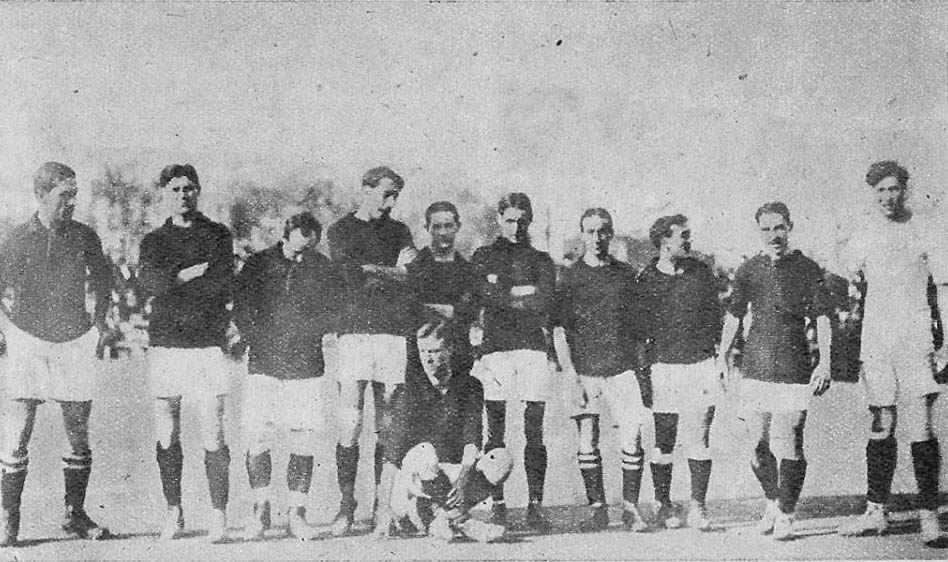
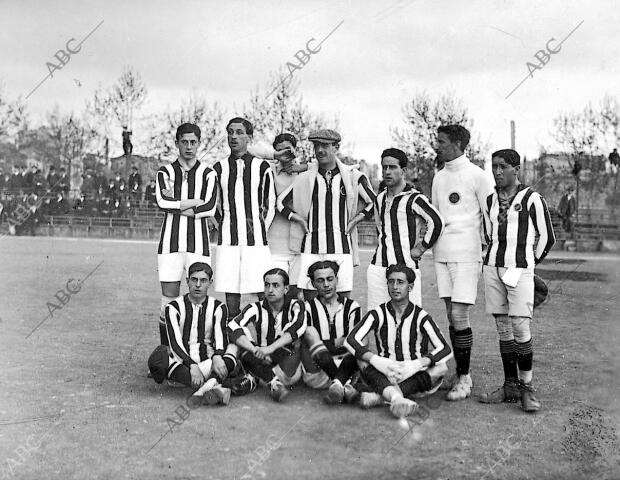
Teams of Barcelona (left) and Sociedad Gimnástica in 1912

== Match details ==
7 April 1912

Barcelona	2–0	Sociedad Gimnástica
Massana 43'; Rodríguez 85'	Report1; Report2

Camp de la Indústria, Barcelona
Referee: (England) John Hamilton

Barcelona

Sociedad Gimnástica

GK	(Spain) Luis Reñé
DF	(Spain) José Irízar
DF	(Spain) Manuel Amechazurra (c)
MF	(Spain) José Berdié
MF	(Spain) Alfredo Massana
MF	(Spain) Enrique Peris
FW	(Spain) Romà Forns
FW	(Spain) Francisco Estévez
FW	(Spain) Pepe Rodríguez
FW	(Spain) Antonio Morales
FW	(Spain) Francisco Armet

GK	(Spain) Modesto Pola
DF	(Spain) Luis Álvarez Roca
DF	(Spain) José Carruana
MF	(Spain) Francisco Baonza
MF	(Spain) José Manuel Kindelán
MF	(Spain) Sócrates Quintana
FW	(Spain) Arturo Espinosa
FW	(Spain) Eulogio Uribarri
FW	(Spain) Ricardo Uribarri
FW	(Spain) Francisco Guzmán
FW	(Spain) Apolinario Rodríguez

== See also ==
- Concurso España
