= Francisco Baonza =

Spanish footballer, referee, and manager (1889–1959)

Personal information
- Full name: Francisco Baonza García
- Date of birth: 5 April 1889
- Place of birth: Madrid, Spain
- Date of death: 20 April 1959 (aged 70)
- Place of death: Barcelona, Spain
- Position: Forward

Senior career*
Years	Team	Apps	(Gls)
1909–1912	Sociedad Gimnástica	1+	
1912–1913	Espanyol		
1913–1918	Barcelona	4+	

Managerial career
- 1929–1931: Deportivo Alavés
- 1931–1932: Malagueño
- * Club domestic league appearances and goals

Francisco Baonza García (5 April 1889 – 20 April 1959) was a Spanish footballer who played as a forward for Espanyol and FC Barcelona in the 1910s. He later worked as a referee in the 1920s, and as a manager in the early 1930s.

== Playing career ==
=== Gimnástica and Madrid ===
Born in Madrid on 5 April 1889, (Note: Some sources wrongly claim that he was born in 1888.) Baonza began his football career at his hometown club Sociedad Gimnástica in 1909, which at the time had a great team, captained by the midfielder Sócrates Quintana, and with José Carruana and José Manuel Kindelán teaming up on defense. Together, they helped Gimnástica win the 1910–11 Centro Championships, and reach the final of the 1912 Copa del Rey, which ended in a 0–2 loss to his future club Barcelona. In June 1912, he played two friendly matches for Madrid FC, both against Deportivo de La Coruña in Galicia, scoring the winner in the former.

=== Espanyol and Barcelona ===
Baonza played for Gimnástica for three years, until 1912, when he joined Espanyol, making his debut in a charity match against Universitari SC, doing so alongside Carruana. However, he only stayed one season at Espanyol, playing a total of seven official matches, all in the Catalan championship. The following year, on 6 April, he started in the semifinals of the 1913 Pyrenees Cup against his future club Barcelona, helping his side to a 3–1 win. In total, he played 18 matches for the club, including 11 official ones.

In 1913, Baonza signed for Barcelona, with whom he played for four years, until 1917, scoring a total of two goals in 27 official matches, and helping Barça win two Catalan championships in 1916 and 1919. He initially played as a right winger, but later established himself as a midfielder. In the infamous semifinals of the 1916 Copa del Rey against Real Madrid, Baonza started in both legs, which ended with a victory apiece, and in the replay, which ended in a 6–6 draw, so Barça decided to replace him for the second replay, and without him, the Blaugrana lost 4–2.

On 17 May 1917, Baonza started for Barça in a friendly against the Catalan national team, helping his side to a 2–1 victory. In 1921 and 1923, he returned to Barça to play a few more friendlies for the club.

In addition to football, Baonza also stood out as a prominent pole vaulter, being a record holder in the pole vault several times, but with a rope instead of a bar.

== Refereeing career ==
After retiring from playing, Baonza became a member of the Catalan Referees' Association, officiating several regional matches in the Catalan first and second categories during the 1920s. On 9 June 1927, he oversaw a match between Catalonia and the Chilean club Colo-Colo at Les Corts, which ended in a 5–4 win to the latter.

== Managerial career ==
In the late 1920s, Baonza imturrumped his refereeing career to take charge of Deportivo Alavés, which he led to promotion to La Liga in 1930. Due to a mistake that has persisted through time, some sources wrongly state that the name of this coach was José or Pepe Baonza. On 2 March 1930, after a heated league fixture in the second division against Cultural Leonesa (1–1), Baonza had to be rescued from the crowd by the Civil Guard, and when the situation was finally calmed, both the referee Rogelio García Soleto and the coach Baonza were taken to the León Civil Government as detainees, but they were both eventually released after paying fines. A few months later, on 7 December, Baonza led Alavés in its top-flight debut, a La Liga fixture against Real Sociedad, which ended in a 2–2 draw.

Baonza coach Alavés for two years, from 1929 until 1931, when he was replaced by Ramón Encinas. In 1932, Baonza, the first-ever La Liga coach in the history of Alavés, was appointed to the helm of Malagueño, a position that he held for just one year.

== Honours ==
Sociedad Gimnástica

- Centro Championship:
  - Champions (2): 1910–11
- Copa del Rey:
  - Runner-up (1): 1912

FC Barcelona

- Catalan championship
  - Champions (2): 1915–16 and 1918–19
