= Arturo Espinosa =

Spanish footballer & referee (1889–1970)

Personal information
- Full name: Arturo López Espinosa
- Date of birth: 1 February 1889
- Place of birth: Madrid, Spain
- Date of death: 30 April 1970 (aged 81)
- Position: Forward

Senior career*
| Years | Team | Apps | (Gls) |
| 1909–1910 | Madrid FC | | |
| 1910–1915 | Sociedad Gimnástica | | |
| 1915–1916 | Madrid FC | | |
13th president of the National Committee of Referees
In office 1952–1952
| Preceded by | Luis Saura del Pan |
| Succeeded by | Eulogio Aranguren |
- * Club domestic league appearances and goals

Arturo López Espinosa (1 February 1889 – 30 April 1970) was a Spanish footballer who played as a forward for Madrid FC and Sociedad Gimnástica in the 1910s. He later worked as a referee, becoming the 13th president of the National Committee of Referees in a brief interlude in 1952.

== Playing career ==
Born in Madrid, Espinosa began his football career in his hometown club Madrid FC in 1909, aged 20, making his debut in a Centro Regional Championship match against his future club Sociedad Gimnástica, scoring once to help his side to a 4–2 win. In the 1909–10 season, he played a total of seven matches for Madrid, including two in the regional championship and two in the 1910 Copa del Rey (UECF), which ended in 0–2 losses to Athletic Bilbao and Vasconia.

In 1910, Espinosa joined the ranks of Sociedad Gimnástica, which at the time had a great team, captained by the midfielder Sócrates Quintana, and with José Carruana and José Manuel Kindelán teaming up on defense. On October and November 1910, he played three friendly matches against his former club Madrid FC, scoring the winner on the latter. Espinosa helped his side win two Centro Championships in 1910–11 and 1913–14, and in 1912, he helped Gimnástica reach which still stands as the only Copa del Rey final in the club's history, which they lost 0–2 to FC Barcelona.

Espinosa remained with the club until 1915, when he returned to Madrid FC, with whom he played for just one year before retiring at the end of the 1915–16 season. In the semifinals of the 1916 Copa del Rey, Madrid faced FC Barcelona in the first competitive El Clásico in 14 years, and after three matches could not decide a winner, Madrid fielded Espinosa for the fourth. Madrid won (4–2), thus reaching the final in which he did not play, which Madrid lost 0–4 to Bilbao.

== Refereeing career ==
In 1924, the 35-year-old Espinosa began his refereeing career, overseeing several matches in regional championships during his first four years. Between 1928 and 1933, he refereed a total of 26 league matches, 19 in the Segunda División, and 7 in La Liga. Espinosa made his refereeing debut in La Liga on 29 November 1931, in a match between Valencia CF and Real Unión, which ended in a 5–1 win to the former. In total, he refereed eight Valencia matches, with the Mestella club winning six and losing two.

In 1952, the 63-year-old Espinosa served as the 13th president of the National Committee of Referees during a brief interlude between Pedro Escartín and the return of Eulogio Aranguren.

== Death ==
Espinosa died on 30 April 1970, at the age of 81.

== Honours ==
RS Gimnástica

- Centro Championship:
  - Champions (2): 1910–11 and 1913–14
- Copa del Rey:
  - Runner-up (1): 1912

Real Madrid

- Centro Championship:
  - Champions (2): 1915–16
