= 1919 Copa del Rey final =

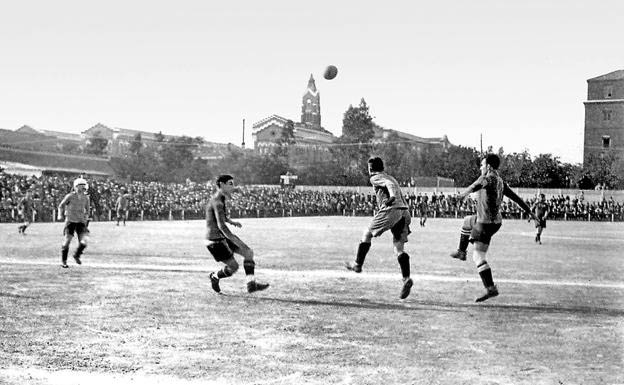
- Event: 1919 Copa del Rey
Arenas de Getxo	Barcelona
5	2
- (after extra time)
- Date: 18 May 1919
- Venue: Martínez Campos, Madrid
- Referee: Julián Ruete
- Attendance: 8,000

The 1919 Copa del Rey final was an association football match between Arenas Club de Getxo and FC Barcelona on 18 May 1919 at the Martínez Campos stadium in Madrid. It was the deciding match of the Spanish cup competition, the Copa del Rey. Both teams progressed through a quarterfinal and a semifinal round to reach the final, with Barcelona going undefeated throughout the tournament. The final was attended by a crowd of 8,000 spectators with all tickets having been sold out. With the match tied 2–2 at the end of regular time, Arenas were able to use their superior endurance to win 5–2 in extra time thanks to goals by Florencio Peña and Juan Ibaibarriaga as well as a hat-trick from Félix Sesúmaga. This victory gave Arenas their first and only national cup title.

== Route to the final ==
Arenas de Getxo
Round	Opposition	Score
Quarterfinal (1st leg)	Racing de Madrid	8–2
Quarterfinal (2nd leg)	Racing de Madrid	0–2
Quarterfinal (replay match)	Racing de Madrid	3–0
Semifinal (1st leg)	Real Vigo Sporting	2–0
Semifinal (2nd leg)	Real Vigo Sporting	6–1

The Copa del Rey is an annual single-elimination tournament which at the time, before the formation of the national league, consisted of the winners of Spain's eight regional leagues. Arenas Club de Getxo and FC Barcelona had qualified to the 17th edition of the Copa del Rey as champions of the Biscay Championship and the Catalan Championship, respectively.

Arenas had previously reached the final in 1917, losing 2–1 in a replay match to Madrid FC. Barcelona had won the competition three times in 1910, 1912, and 1913. In the quarterfinals, Arenas won the first leg against Racing de Madrid 8–2, with Sesúmaga scoring seven goals. Arenas took an early lead by scoring four goals in the first five minutes and Racing could not come back even though they dominated possession in the second half.

The second leg was lost by Getxo 0–2. Arenas had controlled the first half and part of the second, but missed many clear chances to score (including a penalty kick). Under the rules at the time, aggregate score was not used as a tie-breaker, and so a replay match was played 3 days after the second leg even though Arenas had scored 8 goals to Racing's 4 over the two legs. The day of the rematch it rained heavily and, though the pitch did not have proper drainage facilities, the match was played. Arenas won 3–0. After the match, the captain of the Racing lodged a protest accusing the referee of clear partiality towards the hosts. According to the captain, none of the goals were valid (the first being called offside by the assistant referee, the second due to a controversial continuation of play after a rough foul by an Arenas player, and the third as result of a controversial handball call). Additionally, the captain felt that the match should have been postponed due to the weather, with both an assistant referee and the representatives of the Central Spanish Federation believing the pitch conditions were not suitable for play.

Arenas then faced Real Vigo Sporting, a Galician team that had previously reached the final in 1908. Arenas scored in the 10th minute of the first match thanks to a run from Sesúmaga. He followed it again with another goal later in the first half, with Vigo unable to score a penalty. Vigo controlled the second half but were unable to score, Arenas winning 2–0. In the second leg Arenas was much more dominant, demoralizing their captain-less opponents with a 2–0 lead in the first half and handling the heat better in the second to take a 6–1 victory, thus securing a spot in the final.

FC Barcelona
Round	Opposition	Score
Quarterfinal (1st leg)	Real Sociedad	6–0
Quarterfinal (2nd leg)	Real Sociedad	3–1
Semifinal (1st leg)	Sevilla FC	4–3
Semifinal (2nd leg)	Sevilla FC	3–0

Barcelona won all their games in the competition on the way to the final. They defeated Gipuzkoa champions Real Sociedad 6–0 in a sold out home stadium with a hat-trick from Lakatos on 13 April. They had quickly established control of the pitch with Reguera stifling any counter-attack attempt. During the second half, with the score 3–0, Real Sociedad's goalkeeper was substituted due to injury but the backup goalkeeper fared no better with Barcelona scoring three more. Barcelona's players had played individually well and Real Sociedad's "very bad form and attack" was unable to take advantage of the eventual winner's weak teamwork.

One week later Barcelona beat Sociedad away 3–1 at the Atotxa Stadium, coming from behind thanks to another hat-trick (this time from Vicente Martínez). Both teams were praised by the press for their 'noble' play during both legs.

The semifinals were against Regional Sur champions Sevilla FC. In the first leg in Barcelona, the local team began the match overly confident but were quickly surprised by a dominant performance by Sevilla. The visitors managed to equalize twice until Barcelona took over the match in the last 10 minutes, but not before Sevilla scored a late goal in the 85th minute. Barcelona responded instantly with an 86th-minute equalizer and followed it up with an 88th-minute winner by club legend Paulino Alcántara, with the Sevillians by now physically exhausted. The away leg was "unremarkable", with Alcántara scoring three in the second half. Both teams had focused on playing through the air and using headers during this second match and performed better than in the first leg.

== Match ==
=== Build-up ===
Madrid newspaper El siglo futuro had predicted Arenas to win. Attendees broke down the stadium's outside fencing twice to try and get in as all tickets had been sold. Marca reports the attendance at 8,000 spectators, while El Día journalist A. Martin Fernandez estimated at least 7,000.The weather was described as "splendid" by Gran vida journalist Fr. Nasarre, with partly cloudy skies.

=== Summary ===
Barcelona used a more patient, technical style of play while Arenas relied on a brute-force method of reaching the opponent's goal. The latter's physical advantage and consequent endurance was a major influence on the result. Right-back Reguera and right half-back Agustín Sancho were the most hard-working of the Barcelona players but to no avail against the rapid transitional play and defensive solidity of the winners which proved decisive according to Martin Fernandez.

Barcelona was the first to attack, threatening the goal multiple times with Arenas counter-attacking. Arenas took the first shot-on-goal thanks to a "serious attempt" by Pagaza and shortly afterwards, Sesúmaga gave Arenas the lead with a "beautiful" goal. Arenas were then able to take control of possession. Viñals managed to find an equalizer for Barcelona off of a deflected shot from Garchitorena, with the team dominating for the rest of the first half.

Viñals gave the Catalans the lead in the early moments of the second half with a cross that Garchitorena passed to Lakatos for the goal. However, Arenas was the more dominant side during the second half. With just 10 minutes to go, Arenas brought the score to 2–2 thanks to a strike from Sesúmaga. Minutes remaining in regular play, Garchitorena missed a clear shot a few paces from the goal. With the game now in extra time, Sesúmaga once again scored with an assist by Pagaza. Peña then scored the fourth goal for Arenas. A fatigued Barcelona were unable to match the pressuring pace of the Basque team in overtime. Ibaibarriaga then scored with one minute and a half left.

The referees were seen to perform well and neutrally. The head referee, Julián Ruete, announced his decision to retire from refereeing after the match.

=== Details ===
18 May 1919
17:30 CEST

Arenas	5–2 (a.e.t.)	Barcelona
Sesúmaga 12', 80', 96'; F. Peña 116'; Ibaibarriaga 119'	Report1; Report2	Vinyals 38'; Lakatos 55'

Martínez Campos, Madrid
Referee: Julián Ruete

Arenas	Barcelona

GK	1	(Spain) José María Jáuregui (c)
DF	2	(Spain) Pedro Vallana
DF	3	(Spain) Domingo Careaga
MF	4	(Spain) Gumersindo Uriarte
MF	5	(Spain) José Arruza
MF	6	(Spain) José María Peña
FW	7	(Spain) Juan Ibaibarriaga
FW	8	(Spain) Pagaza
FW	9	(Spain) Félix Sesúmaga
FW	10	(Spain) Pedro Barturen
FW	11	(Spain) Florencio Peña
Manager:
(Spain) José María Jáuregui

GK	1	(Spain) Luis Bru
DF	2	(Spain) Eduardo Reguera (c)
DF	3	(Spain) Josep Costa
MF	4	(Spain) Ramón Torralba
MF	5	(Spain) Agustín Sancho
MF	6	(Spain) Eusebio Blanco
FW	7	(Spain) Francisco Vinyals
FW	8	(Spain) Juan Garchitorena
FW	9	(Spain) Vicente Martínez
FW	10	(Spain) Paulino Alcántara
FW	11	(Spain) Lakatos
Manager:
(England) Jack Greenwell
