= Francisco Armet =

Spanish footballer

Personal information
- Full name: Francisco Armet de Castellví
- Date of birth: 5 November 1892
- Place of birth: Terrassa, Spain
- Date of death: 23 March 1973 (aged 80)
- Place of death: Madrid, Spain
- Position: Defender

Senior career*
Years	Team	Apps	(Gls)
1910–1912	Universitary SC		
1912–1913	FC Barcelona		
1913–1919	Espanyol		
1923	Espanyol		

International career
1916–1917	Catalonia	9	(0)
Medal record
Catalonia
Prince of Asturias Cup
Gold medal – first place	1916 Prince of Asturias Cup	Team
- * Club domestic league appearances and goals

Francisco Armet de Castellví (5 November 1892 in Terrassa – 23 March 1973 in Madrid), nicknamed "Pakán", was a Spanish footballer who played as a defender.

== Club career ==
Francisco Armet was born into a family of the Catalan aristocracy. Together with his younger brothers Juan and Jordi (both forwards), he formed one of the most outstanding lineages of footballers of the early 20th century in Catalonia. Born in Terrassa, Pakán began to play football in 1910 with Universitary SC, featuring alongside his younger brother, Juan. After 2 seasons with the club, he joined FC Barcelona in 1912, with whom he played for just one year, but despite his short spell there, he managed to win one Copa del Rey title in 1912 after helping Barça beat Sociedad Gimnástica 2-0 in the final.

At the end of the season in 1913, he was transferred to Espanyol, with whom he played for six seasons, forming a brilliant defensive line alongside Ricardo Zamora (goalkeeper) and Amadeo Puig and reaching another Copa del Rey Final in 1915, which they lost 0-5 to Athletic Bilbao. He was one of the people responsible for encouraging Ricardo Zamora to start playing football, as he did not have the sympathies of his parents to play football, and indeed, Zamora would go on to make his debut for Espanyol in 1916. In the 1916/17 season, Pakán became the captain of Espanyol, demonstrating the great respect that his teammates and his hierarchy had for him on the pitch.

He retired in 1919, but he still played some friendly matches at the start of the 1923-24 season.

== International career ==
Being a Espanyol player, he was summoned to play for the Catalonia national team several times, and in May 1916, he was a member of the Catalan team that won the second edition of the Prince of Asturias Cup in 1916, an inter-regional competition organized by the RFEF.

== Honours ==
=== Club ===
Barcelona

Copa del Rey:

- Champions (1): 1912
- Runner-up (1): 1915

=== International ===
Catalonia

Prince of Asturias Cup:

- Champions (1): 1916
