= 1912–13 Madrid FC season =

11th season in existence of Real Madrid CF

Madrid FC
1912–13 season
- President: Adolfo Meléndez
- Manager: Arthur Johnson
- Stadium: Campo de O'Donnell
- Madrid Regional Championship (Note: The Campeonato Regional de Madrid (Madrid Regional Championship) was a regional league used as a qualifier for the Copa del Rey.): 1st
- Copa del Rey: Semi-finals
- Top goalscorer: League: Eguinoa; Irureta; Saura (2); All: Eguinoa; Irureta; Saura (2)
- Biggest win: Madrid FC 4–0 RS Gimnástica
- Biggest defeat: Athletic Bilbao 3–0 Madrid FC
Home colours	Away colours

The 1912–13 season was Madrid Football Club's 11th season in existence. The club played some friendly matches. They also played in the Campeonato Regional de Madrid (Madrid Regional Championship) and the Copa del Rey.

== Summary ==
- 31 October 1912: The Campo de O'Donnell was inaugurated and became Madrid FC's home stadium. Two days later, the headline of Spanish daily ABC read: "The match between Sporting de Irún and said Society [Madrid FC] was held at Madrid's field and was a booming success. Sporting Club is one of the best teams to visit Madrid. They pass very well and have a beautiful aerial game. Perhaps they missed the sandy pitch. Madrid deserve the most profound congratulations for drawing against a team as fine as Sporting.

== Players ==
Note: Flags indicate national team as defined under FIFA eligibility rules; some limited exceptions apply. Players may hold more than one non-FIFA nationality.

No.	Pos.	Nation	Player
—	GK	ESP	Juan de Cárcer
—	DF	ESP	José Ladislao Irureta
—	DF	ESP	Marcelo Bernabéu
—	DF	ESP	Bernardo Menéndez
—	MF	ESP	Arsenio Comamala
—	MF	ESP	Manuel Prast

No.	Pos.	Nation	Player
—	MF	ESP	Joaquín Rodríguez Eguinoa
—	MF	ESP	Olivares
—	MF	ARG	Sotero Aranguren
—	FW	ESP	Luis Saura
—	FW	CUB	Martín José Juantorena
—	FW	ESP	Santiago Bernabéu

== Friendlies ==
13 October 1912 Friendly	Athletic Madrid	2–1	Madrid FC	Madrid
	Zuloaga	Report	Juantorena	Stadium: Av. Plaza de Toros; Referee: Pola

20 October 1912 Friendly	SE Gimnástica	0–1	Madrid FC	Madrid
		Report	Juantorena	Stadium: Av. Plaza de Toros; Referee: Allende

20 October 1912 Friendly – Reserve team	Athletic Madrid	10–0	Madrid FC	Madrid
Morning		Report		Stadium: Av. Plaza de Toros; Referee: Pola
Note: The match was played by the reserve teams of both clubs.

27 October 1912 Friendly	Español de Madrid	1–7	Madrid FC	Madrid
		Report		Stadium: Av. Plaza de Toros; Referee: E. Uribarri

1 November 1912 Friendly	Madrid FC	0–0	Sporting Club de Irún	Madrid
		Report		Stadium: Campo de O'Donnell; Referee: Kindelán
Note: This was the inaugural match held at Madrid FC's new stadium. Albéniz (F. Bourbón) was injured in the first half and retired in the second half leaving Madrid FC to play the rest of the match with 10 players.

1 November 1912 Copa Excelsior	Madrid FC	1–4	Sporting Club de Irún	Madrid
	Juantorena	Report	Estomba; Ugarte; J. Angoso; M. Angoso	Stadium: Campo de O'Donnell; Referee: Guzmán

10 November 1912 Friendly	Madrid FC	1–1	Athletic Madrid	Madrid
		Report		Stadium: Campo de O'Donnell; Referee: Uribarri

24 November 1912 Friendly	Madrid FC	4–0	Universitari SC Barcelona	Madrid
	Rodríguez; Puntas (o.g.); Olivares; Saura	Report		Stadium: Campo de O'Donnell; Referee: Comamala

25 November 1912 Friendly	Madrid FC	2–3	Universitari SC Barcelona	Madrid
	Juantorena; Prast	Report	? ? ?	Stadium: Campo de O'Donnell; Referee: Kindelán

8 December 1912 Friendly	Madrid FC	4–0	Club Hispania Valencia	Madrid
	Saura; Prast	Report		Stadium: Campo de O'Donnell; Referee: Menéndez

9 December 1912 Friendly	Madrid FC	3–1	Club Hispania Valencia	Madrid
	Rodríguez 5'; Saura (?) 85'	Report	Ferrer 7'	Stadium: Campo de O'Donnell; Referee: Heredia
Note: Kindelán of SE Gimnástica played for Club Hispania Valencia in this match.

15 December 1912 Friendly	Cardenal Cisneros	2–3	Madrid FC	Madrid
		Report		Stadium: Ciudad Lineal

25 December 1912 Friendly	Madrid FC	2–0	Español de Madrid	Madrid
		Report		Stadium: Campo de O'Donnell

25 December 1912 Friendly	Madrid FC	1–1	RS Gimnástica	Madrid
	Juantorena	Report	J. Kindelán	Stadium: Campo de O'Donnell; Referee: Pérez

31 December 1912 Friendly	Madrid FC (Spain)	4–1	(France) Racing Club de Paris	Madrid, Spain
	Juantorena 5'; Rodríguez (?), 90'; Kindelán 81'	Report	Chartón (?)	Stadium: Campo de O'Donnell; Referee: Albéniz

1 January 1913 Friendly	Madrid FC (Spain)	0–2	(France) Racing Club de Paris	Madrid, Spain
		Report	Bacrot; Irureta (o.g.)	Stadium: Campo de O'Donnell; Referee: Moreno Luque

2 January 1913 Friendly	Madrid FC (Spain)	1–1	(France) Racing Club de Paris	Madrid, Spain
	Rodríguez (?)	Report	Charton 10'	Stadium: Campo de O'Donnell; Referee: Albéniz and Torres
Note: Ricardo Uribarri, the RS Gimnástica forward, played for Madrid FC in this match.

5 January 1913 Friendly	Madrid FC	1–0	España FC Barcelona	Madrid
	Rodríguez	Report		Stadium: Campo de O'Donnell; Referee: Arango

6 January 1913 Friendly	Madrid FC	0–1	España FC Barcelona	Madrid
		Report	Baro	Stadium: Campo de O'Donnell; Referee: Uribarri

23 January 1913 Friendly	Internacional Lisboa (Portugal)	1–1	(Spain) Madrid FC	Lisbon, Portugal
		Report	Baro	Stadium: Laranjeiras

25 January 1913 Friendly	Sporting CP (Portugal)	3–4	(Spain) Madrid FC	Lisbon, Portugal
	C. Rosa Rodrigues; A. Rosa Rodrigues ?	Report	? ? ? ?	Stadium: Sitio das Mouras

25 January 1913 Friendly	S.L. Benfica (Portugal)	7–0	(Spain) Madrid FC	Lisbon, Portugal
	Ferreira 2' ? (o.g.); Gaspar 13', (?); Vieira; Rio	Report		Stadium: Sitio das Mouras; Referee: Rosa Rodrigues

21 March 1913 Friendly	Madrid FC	0–0	RS Gimnástica	Madrid
		Report		Stadium: Campo de O'Donnell

20 April 1913 Friendly – 2nd team	Madrid FC	5–3	RS Gimnástica	Madrid
		Report		Stadium: Campo de O'Donnell
Note: The match was played by the second teams of both clubs.

27 April 1913 Charity match	Madrid FC	4–1	RS Gimnástica	Madrid
	Juantorena; Rodríguez (pen.); Saura	Report	Espinosa (pen.)	Stadium: Campo de O'Donnell; Referee: Lemmel
Note: The match was to benefit the anti-tuberculosis league.

1 May 1913 Friendly	Madrid FC (Spain)	1–0	(Portugal) Internacional Lisboa	Madrid, Spain
	Juantorena	Report		Stadium: Campo de O'Donnell

15 May 1913 Friendly	Madrid FC (Spain)	2–1	(Portugal) S.L. Benfica	Madrid, Spain
	Rodríguez; Juantorena	Report	?	Stadium: Campo de O'Donnell; Referee: Kindelán

=== Trofeo Ciudad Lineal ===
The Trofeo Ciudad Lineal was held in the context of a sports festival organized by the director of the Velodrome.

8 December 1912 Semi-final	Instituto Cisneros	2–3	Madrid FC	Madrid
	Rey; Larrañaga	Report	Comamala; Casanova; C. Bourbon	Stadium: Ciudad Lineal; Referee: Baonza

29 December 1912 Final	Español de Madrid	0–2	Madrid FC	Madrid
		Report	Prast; Juantorena	Stadium: Ciudad Lineal; Referee: Belaunde

== Competitions ==
=== Overview ===
Competition	First match	Last match	Starting round	Final position	Record							
Competition	First match	Last match	Starting round	Final position	Pld	W	D	L	GF	GA	GD	Win %
Campeonato Regional de Madrid	16 February 1913	9 March 1913	Matchday 1	Winners	4	3	1	0	11	5	+6	75.00
Copa del Rey	17 March 1913	17 March 1913	Semi-finals	Semi-finalist	1	0	0	1	0	3	−3	0.00
Total					5	3	1	1	11	8	+3	60.00

Source: Competitions

=== Campeonato Regional de Madrid ===
==== League table ====
Pos	Team	Pld	W	D	L	GF	GA	GD	Pts	Qualification
1	Madrid (C, Q)	3	2	1	0	8	3	+5	5	Qualification for the Copa del Rey
2	Athletic Madrid	3	1	1	1	6	6	0	3	
3	Español Madrid	3	1	1	1	3	3	0	3	
4	RS Gimnástica	3	0	1	2	3	8	−5	1	

Source: Rec.Sport.Soccer Statistics Foundation
Rules for classification: 1) points; 2) goal difference; 3) number of goals scored.
(C) Champions; (Q) Qualified for the phase indicated

==== Matches ====
16 February 1913 1	Madrid FC	3–3	Athletic Madrid	Madrid
	Saura; Irureta; Eguinoa		Zuloaga; Palacios	Stadium: Campo de O'Donnell; Referee: Kindelán (Gimnástica de Madrid)

23 February 1913 2	Madrid FC	1–0	Español de Madrid	Madrid
	Tejedor (o.g.)			Stadium: Estadio O'Donnell; Referee: Allende

2 March 1913 3	Madrid FC	4–0	RS Gimnástica	Madrid
	Eguinoa, Torena,			Stadium: Estadio O'Donnell; Referee: V. Buylla

9 March 1913 Tiebreaker	Madrid FC	3–2	Athletic Madrid	Madrid
	Comamala 50'; Irureta; Saura 130'		Axpe; 85' (o.g.) Olivares	Stadium: Estadio O'Donnell; Referee: Manuel Yarza
Note: As there was a tie, the two teams agreed to extend play by periods of 15 minutes. Madrid FC won in the third one. The match lasted two hours and 15 minutes.

=== Copa del Rey ===
17 March 1913 Semi-final	Madrid FC	0–3	Athletic Bilbao	Madrid
		Report	Pichichi 2', 11'; Cortadi 53'	Stadium: Campo de O'Donnell; Referee: Martínez

=== Campeonato de España de Segundos Equipos ===
The Royal Spanish Football Federation organized a national championship for second teams of clubs. Seven teams entered the Madrid qualifying phase. Madrid FC's second team was seeded directly to the semifinals.

17 March 1913 Semi-final	Madrid FC	0–1	RS Gimnástica	Madrid
		Report		Stadium: Campo de O'Donnell
