= 1919 Copa del Rey =

19th Copa del Rey

Tournament details
- Country: Spain

Final positions
- Champions: Arenas Club de Getxo (1st title)
- Runners-up: FC Barcelona

Tournament statistics
- Matches played: 13
- Goals scored: 55 (4.23 per match)
- Top goal scorer(s): Félix Sesúmaga (10 goals)

The Copa del Rey 1919 was the 19th staging of the Copa del Rey, the Spanish football cup competition.

The competition started on 12 April 1919, and concluded on 18 May 1919, with the final, held at the Martínez Campos in Madrid, in which Arenas Club de Getxo lifted the trophy for the first time ever with a 5–2 victory over FC Barcelona after extra-time with a hat-trick from Félix Sesúmaga.

== Teams ==
- Biscay Region: Arenas Club de Getxo
- Gipuzkoa Region: Real Sociedad
- Centre Region: Racing de Madrid
- South Region: Sevilla FC
- Galicia Region: Real Vigo Sporting
- Asturias Region: Sporting de Gijón
- Catalonia Region: FC Barcelona
- Levante Region: CD Águilas (Note: Withdrew before the draw.)

== Quarterfinals ==
=== First leg ===
30 March 1919

Arenas Club de Getxo	8–2	Racing de Madrid
Sesúmaga 1', 2', 3', 8', 30', 50', 60'; Pagaza 80'	Report	Ricardo Álvarez 40', 70'

Josaleta Stadium, Getxo
Referee: (Spain) Cecilio Ibarreche

6 April 1919

Real Vigo Sporting	2–2	Sporting de Gijón
Nolasco Lorenzo 42', 50'	Report	Manuel Meana 35'; Adolfo Trapote 90+12'

Campo de Coia, Vigo
Referee: (Spain) Guillermo Larrañaga

13 April 1919

FC Barcelona	6–0	Real Sociedad
Martínez 20'; Alcántara 44', 70'; Lakatos 55', 62', 79'	Report

Camp de Les Corts, Barcelona
Referee: (Spain) Ezequiel Montero

=== Second leg ===
6 April 1919

Racing de Madrid	2–0	Arenas Club de Getxo
Ricardo Álvarez 41'; Portugés 44'	Report

Campo de O'Donnell (Atlético Madrid), Madrid
Referee: (Spain) Julián Ruete

Arenas Club de Getxo and Racing de Madrid won one match each. At that year, the aggregate score was not taken into account. A replay match was played.

13 April 1919

Sporting de Gijón	1–1	Real Vigo Sporting
Villaverde I 10'	Report	Chiarroni 20'

Gijón
Referee: (Spain) Antonio de Cárcer

Sporting de Gijón and Real Vigo Sporting tied, with both games drawn. A replay match was played.

20 April 1919

Real Sociedad	1–3	FC Barcelona
José Arrate I 10' (pen.)	Report	Martínez 35', 60', 85'

Atotxa Stadium, San Sebastián
Referee: (Spain) Julián Ruete

FC Barcelona won 2–0 on aggregate matches and qualified for the semifinals.

=== Replay matches ===
9 April 1919

Racing de Madrid	0–3	Arenas Club de Getxo
	Report	Ibaibarriaga 50'; Barturen 75'; Vallana 80' (pen.)

Martínez Campos, Madrid
Referee: (Spain) Julián Ruete

Arenas Club qualified for the semifinals.

27 April 1919

Real Vigo Sporting	3–0	Sporting de Gijón
Moncho Gil 73'; Teodoro Cruces 76', 83'	Report

El Sardinero, Santander
Referee: (Spain) Cecilio Ibarreche

Real Vigo qualified for the semifinals.

Bye: Sevilla FC

== Semifinals ==
=== First leg ===
27 April 1919

FC Barcelona	4–3	Sevilla FC
Lakatos 31'; Martínez 43'; Garchitorena 86'; Alcántara 88'	Report	Kinké 35' (pen.), 85'; Otero 49'

Camp de Les Corts, Barcelona
Referee: (Spain) Ezequiel Montero

4 May 1919

Real Vigo Sporting	0–2	Arenas Club de Getxo
	Report	Sesúmaga 12', 40'

Campo de Coia, Vigo
Referee: (England) Bartlett

=== Second leg ===
30 April 1919

Sevilla FC	0–3	FC Barcelona
	Report	Alcántara 60', 76', 82'

Madrid
Referee: (Spain) Antonio de Cárcer

FC Barcelona win 2–0 on aggregate matches.

11 May 1919

Arenas Club de Getxo	6–1	Real Vigo Sporting
Sesúmaga 10', 63', 67', 84'; Barturen 33', 69'	Report	Vallana 81' (o.g.)

Josaleta Stadium, Getxo
Referee: (Spain) Cecilio Ibarreche

Arenas Club de Getxo win 2–0 on aggregate matches.

== Final ==
18 May 1919
17:30 CEST

Arenas Club de Getxo	5–2 (a.e.t.)	FC Barcelona
Sesúmaga 12', 80', 96'; F. Peña 116'; Ibaibarriaga 119'	Report	Viñals 38'; Lakatos 55'

Martínez Campos, Madrid
Referee: Julián Ruete

Copa del Rey 1919 winners
Arenas de Getxo
1st title
