= Ricardo Uribarri =

Spanish footballer

Personal information
- Full name: Ricardo Uribarri León
- Date of birth: 14 May 1891
- Place of birth: Sevilla, Spain
- Date of death: Unknown
- Position: Forward

Senior career*
Years	Team	Apps	(Gls)
1910–1915	Sociedad Gimnástica		
1915–1916	Athletic Club de Madrid		
1916–1917	Sociedad Gimnástica		
1917–1918	Madrid FC		
- * Club domestic league appearances and goals

Eulogio Uribarri León (14 May 1891 – Unknown), was a Spanish footballer who played as a forward for Sociedad Gimnástica, Atlético Madrid, and Madrid FC.

== Club career ==
Uribarri began his career with Sociedad Gimnástica in 1911, with whom he played for 4 seasons until 1915, featuring alongside his younger brother Eulogio. At the turn of the decade Sociedad Gimnástica, propelled by the likes of the Uribarri brothers, Sócrates Quintana, Kindelán, and José Carruana, began to disrupt the monopoly of Madrid FC and Atlético Madrid, competing head-to-head with them and winning the Centro Championship on four occasions, three of which in a row between 1910 and 1912 and a fourth in 1913–14. In the semifinals of the 1912 Copa del Rey, he scored once against Irún Sporting Club to help his side to a 4–2, thus contributing decisively in helping Gimnástica reach the final, in which he started in a 0–2 loss to FC Barcelona. On 3 January 1913, Uribarri played a friendly match for Madrid FC as a reinforcement against Racing Club de France, which ended in a 1–1 draw.

In 1915, most of the Gimnástica joined Athletic Club de Madrid, where Uribarri featured alongside the likes of Pagaza and the Villaverde brothers (Fernando and Senén). However, there are no references of Ricardo ever making his debut with Atlético. He then went on to play for Atlético neighbors, Sociedad Gimnástica, and then for their rivals, Madrid FC, with whom he played in two matches in the 1917–18 regional championship, which Madrid won with 10 points, two more than Atlético.

On 21 April 1918, Uribarri played a friendly match for FC Barcelona against Sabadell, playing with fellow debutants, such as the 12-year-old Armando Sagi, who scored Barça's only goal in a 1–2 loss.

== Honours ==
Sociedad Gimnástica

- Centro Championship:
  - Champions (2): 1910–11 and 1913–14
- Copa del Rey:
  - Runner-up (1): 1912

Madrid FC

- Centro Championship:
  - Champions (1): 1917–18
