= Uribarri (disambiguation) =

Uribarri is the second district of the city of Bilbao. Uribarri may also refer to:

== People ==
- Eulogio Uribarri (1894–1972), Spanish footballer
- José Luis Uribarri (1936–2012), Spanish television presenter
- Manuel Uribarri (1896–1962), Spanish soldier
- Ricardo Uribarri, Spanish footballer
- Unai Uribarri (born 1984), Spanish road bicycle racer

== Other uses ==
- Uribarri station, rapid transit/commuter rail station in Spain
