= Pedro Barturen =

Spanish footballer

Personal information
- Full name: Pedro Barturen Urigüen
- Date of birth: 1895
- Place of birth: Spain
- Date of death: Unknown
- Position: Midfielder

Senior career*
Years	Team	Apps	(Gls)
1915–1922	Arenas Club		

International career
1914–1915	Biscay	+2	(1)
1915	Basque Country	+2	(0)
Medal record
Basque Country
Prince of Asturias Cup
Gold medal – first place	1915 Prince of Asturias Cup	Team
- * Club domestic league appearances and goals

Pedro Barturen Urigüen (1895 – Unknown), was a Spanish artist and footballer who played as a midfielder for Arenas Club.

== Club career ==
Barturen played with Arenas Club for 7 years, playing a pivotal role in helping Arenas reach the Copa del Rey final on two occasions (1917 and 1919), losing the former to Madrid FC, but winning the latter after a 5–2 win over the powerful FC Barcelona. He also won three North Championships in 1916–17, 1918–19 and 1921–22.

== International career ==
Being an Arenas Club player, he was eligible to play for the Biscay national team, and he was one of the eleven footballers that played in the team's first-ever game on 13 December 1914 at San Mamés against fellow Basques Gipuzkoa, and it was Barturen who scored the first goal in the team's history as Biscay won 2–1. During this time he was also summoned to play for the Norte team, a side consisting of Basque players that usually featured only players from the Basque provinces of Biscay and Gipuzkoa, each of which also organized their own representative matches occasionally such as the one mentioned before. In May 1915, he was selected to represent the Norte team in the first edition of the Prince of Asturias Cup, an inter-regional competition organized by the RFEF. He played in one game, which ended in a 1–0 win over Catalonia, and with Norte holding the hosts, the Centro team (a Castile/Madrid XI), to a 1–1 draw in the following game, they were proclaimed champions.

== Honours ==
=== Club ===
Arenas Club

- North Championships
  - Winners (3): 1916–17, 1918–19 and 1921–22
- Copa del Rey
  - Champions (1): 1919
  - Runner-up (1): 1917

=== International ===
Basque Country

- Prince of Asturias Cup:
  - Champions (1) 1915
