= José Landazabal =

Spanish footballer

José Landazábal
Personal information
- Full name: José Landazábal Uriarte
- Date of birth: 7 January 1899
- Place of birth: Durango, Biscay, Spain
- Date of death: 5 February 1970 (aged 71)
- Place of death: Bilbao, Spain
- Position: Forward

Youth career
- 1909–1912: Irala-Barri FC
- 1912–1914: Hispania

Senior career*
Years	Team	Apps	(Gls)
1914–1917	Eibar FC		
1917–1918	Athletic Club		
1918	Canadienses FC		
1918–1920	Barcelona	53	(33)
1920–1923	Martinenc		
1923–1924	Espanyol		
1924–1926	Martinenc		
1926–1927	Gimnástico FC		
1927–1928	Patria Aragón		
1928–1929	SD Plentzia		
1929–1930	CD Getxo		
1930–1931	Hospitalenc SC		

International career
1924	Catalonia	1	(0)
- * Club domestic league appearances and goals

José Landazábal Uriarte (7 January 1899 – 5 February 1970), nicknamed Lakatos, was a Spanish footballer who played as a forward for Athletic Bilbao, Barcelona, and Espanyol in the 1910s and 1920s. He earned his nickname Lakatos for his resemblance to the Hungarian international footballer Schlosser-Lakatos.

== Club career ==
=== Early career ===
Born in Durango, Biscay, on 7 January 1899, (Note: Some sources state that he was baptized in the parish of St. James in Bilbao on 17 March 1898.) Landazabal began to play football in the youth ranks of local club Irala-Barri FC and Hispania, helping the latter side win the Children's championship in 1913, at the age of 14, doing it so while playing "with espadrilles in every game". It was probably around this time that he was nicknamed Lakatos because, in January 1914, the great star of the Hungarian Ferencvaros team, Imre Schlosser Lakatos, was in San Mamés.

In 1914, the 15-year-old Landazabal was signed by New Club, who paid him 60 pesetas a month and accommodation; two seasons later, he played a crucial role in helping them win the North second category in the 1916–17 season.

=== Bilbao and Barça ===
At New Club, Landazabal stood out for his adapting and physical qualities, which eventually drew the attention of Athletic Club, who signed him in 1917 to replace the great Félix Zubizarreta. He made his debut for Bilbao in a Biscay Championship match against Real Unión on 6 October 1917, which ended in a 1–2 loss as Unión went on to win the title. In total, he played seven official matches for Bilbao, the last of which was on 6 January 1918, also against Unión, but this time ending in a 1–0 victory.

On the advice of Paco Bru, Landazabal joined the football team of the popular electrical company La Canadiane, the so-called Canadienses FC, which was dissolved shortly after either because it was not serious for a company to have a football team or because of the complaints about having undercover professionals like Lakatos. He then signed for Barcelona in 1918, for whom he debuted on 15 September of that year, in a tribute match to Pere Monistrol that ended in a 2–1 win over CE Sabadell FC. Lakatos formed a great attacking front with Vicente Martínez and Paulino Alcántara, which was pivotal in Barcelona's back-to-back Catalan championships and Copa del Rey finals between 1918 and 1920. Oddly, Barcelona won the 1920 final in which he did not play, but lost the 1919 final in which he played and scored in a 2–5 loss to Arenas de Getxo, courtesy of a hat-trick from Félix Sesúmaga, who then joined Barcelona, which prompted his dismissal from the club in 1920, leaving the club with 55 matches and 37 goals. In 1944, Lakatos assured that he earned 600 pesetas a month during his time at Barça, which would make him the first-ever player to openly admit that he was a professional.

=== Later career ===
His next club was FC Martinenc of the Catalan second category, with whom he played for six years, from 1920 until 1926, sept for the 1923–24 season, which he spent at Espanyol, where he played 10 matches in the Catalan Championship. Landazabal became the greatest figure of Martinenc in the 1920s, helping the club achieve promotion to the main category at the end of the 1922–23 season following a 4–2 win over Esperanza de San Sebastián on 13 May 1923 at Atotxa, with Lakatos closing the scoring in the 85th minute. In August 1922 he played two friendlies with Athletic Club against Real Sociedad, in which he scored two goals, and on 27 May 1923, he reappeared with Barcelona, netting in a 5–0 win over Bishop Auckland at Les Corts, in the same match Hungarian goalkeeper Ferenc Plattkó made his debut for the Catalan club. Martinenc granted him a tribute match on 30 June 1926, in which they faced a Barça team that had the likes of Piera, Samitier, and Alcántara, and shockingly, the local team thrashed the visitors 6–1, with 'Laka' scoring his last two goals as a Martinenc footballer.

In 1927, Landazabal left Catalonia to join Gimnástico de Valencia, before signing for Patria Aragón in Zaragoza, with whom he faced his former club Barcelona in the 1928 Copa del Rey; in a tie in which Lakatos scored his side's consolation goal. After a couple of short spells at Plentzia, Getxo and Hospitalenc SC, he hung up his boots in 1931.

== International career ==
Landazabal earned only one cap for the Catalonia national team, which was held on 24 February 1924 against Avenç del Sport as a tribute match to Gabriel Bau.

== Later life and death ==
After retiring from football, Landazabal ran his own automobile business, but it later fell apart. He was found dead of natural causes in the pension where he lived in Bilbao, on 5 February 1970, at the age of 71.

== Honours ==
Barcelona

- Catalan championship:
  - Champions (2): 1918–19 and 1919–20
- Copa del Rey:
  - Champions (1): 1920
  - Runner-up (1): 1919
