= Juan Ibaibarriaga =

Spanish footballer

Personal information
- Full name: Juan Bautista Ibaibarriaga
- Date of birth: 29 August 1898
- Place of birth: Getxo, Biscay, Spain
- Date of death: 23 March 1925 (aged 26)
- Position: Midfielder

Senior career*
Years	Team	Apps	(Gls)
1918–1924	Arenas de Getxo		

International career
1922–1924	Biscay	+4	(0)
- * Club domestic league appearances and goals

Juan Bautista Ibaibarriaga (29 August 1898 – 23 March 1925) was a Spanish footballer who usually played as a midfielder for Arenas de Getxo. The highlight of his career was scoring one of the winning goals of the 1919 Copa del Rey Final as Arenas defeated the powerful FC Barcelona 5–2. Like many other Arenas Club players of that time, he played a few games for the Biscay national team, participating in both the 1922–23 and the 1923–24 Prince of Asturias Cups, an official inter-regional competition organized by the RFEF. Both campaigns ended in narrow defeats to Asturias (3–4) and Catalonia (0–1).

== Honours ==
Arenas Club

- North Championship: 1918–19, 1921–22
- Copa del Rey: 1919
