= Joaquín Rodríguez =

Joaquín Rodríguez may refer to:

- Joaquín Rodríguez, known as Costillares (1743–1800), Spanish bullfighter, considered the father of modern bullfighting
- Joaquín Rodríguez (basketball) (born 1999), Uruguayan player
- Joaquín Rodríguez Eguinoa (1888–1937), Spanish footballer
- Joaquín Rodríguez Espinar (born 1982), Spanish footballer
- Joaquín Rodríguez Ortega, known as "Cagancho" (1903–1984), Spanish bullfighter
- Joaquín Rodríguez Rozas, (fl. 19th century) Chilean politician
- Joaquín Rodríguez Silva (fl. 1930s), Chilean politician

== See also ==
- Joaquim Rodríguez (born 1979), Spanish cyclist
