= Landazabal =

Landazabal or Landazábal is a Spanish surname. Notable people with the surname include:

- Fernando Landazábal (1922–1998), Colombian military officer
- Germán Landazábal (1884–1953), Spanish composer and pianist
- Isaac Botella Pérez de Landazabal (born 1984), Spanish male artistic gymnast
- José Landazabal (1899–1970), Spanish footballer
