= Julio Chulilla =

Spanish footballer and publisher (1887–1960)

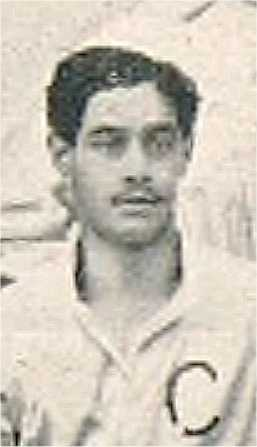
- Julio Chulilla in 1905

Personal information
- Full name: Julio Chulilla Gazol
- Date of birth: 2 February 1887
- Place of birth: Madrid, Spain
- Date of death: 7 January 1960 (aged 72)
- Place of death: Madrid, Spain
- Height: 1.54 m (5 ft 1 in)
- Position: Forward

Senior career*
Years	Team	Apps	(Gls)
1905–1912	Madrid FC		
- * Club domestic league appearances and goals

Julio Chulilla Gazol (2 February 1887 – 7 January 1960) was a Spanish footballer who played as a forward for Madrid FC. He was one of the most important figures in the amateur beginnings of Madrid FC as a club founder in 1903, as a player for the team between 1905 and 1912, and then as secretary from 1912 to 1924, and even as the editor of Madrid Sport, the official organ of the club.

== Early life ==
Julio Chulilla Gazol was born on 2 February 1887 in Madrid, as the son of Atanasio Chulilla y Villaroya, a merchant who went bankrupt in 1906 and died in Madrid in 1919, leaving his wife, Ignacia Gazol Reula, a widow, with five children, three of whom were sons.

The surname Chulilla is toponymic derived from the Andalusian town of the same name in the province of Murcia in Spain. As a typical Andalusian, even though he was born in Madrid, Chulilla was a short man with dark hair and a mustache, being measured at 1.54 meters tall and was therefore reformed at the military visit, but he was gifted with great communication. Chulilla also had a lively and nervous temperament oriented more towards action than study; in fact, he soon abandoned his studies in customs at the Centro de Instruccion Comercial in Madrid; then directed by Eugenio Sainz Romillo, whose niece he would marry in 1921; to dedicate himself to his true passion: sport.

That niece was Maria del Carmen Sainz Alvarez Mesa, who he married in the autumn of 1921. Her mother participated in the ceremony as godmother of the bride and her uncle Eugenio Sainz Romillo as best man for her bride, while her father was absent. Sainz was the granddaughter on her paternal side of Teodoro Sainz Rueda, a liberal republican deputy in the Cortes, and on her maternal side of Florentino Alvarez Mesa Arroyo, a mayor of Avilés for many years, liberal politician and journalist. His first son, Julio, was born on 23 April 1923, which coincided with the inauguration of the Campo de Ciudad Lineal. Chulilla was in such a hurry that he was able to get to both things, with the birth of Julio at 1:15 p.m. and the inaugural game starting at 4:00 p.m. with him present. His love for the club was so much so that he managed to transmit his enthusiasm to his son, who started going to the Madrid field at the age of 4, where under the watchful eye of my father, he began collecting the balls that left the field of play.

== Real Madrid ==
=== Real Madrid forward ===
Chulilla began his footballing career at Sociedad Gimnástica, then in Iberia FC, and finally in Madrid FC, where he played as a striker from 1905 to 1912, as well as being counted among the founders with card number 2 of what would later become one of the most famous football clubs in the world: Real Madrid CF. In fact, together with Carlos Aparici, Suárez Sousa, Pedro Parages, and Santiago Bernabéu, Chulilla was one of the representatives of the club the day that Alfonso XIII granted to Madrid the title of Real. He can be seen in the photograph that immortalizes this historic event with a frock coat and top hat. At the time he was nicknamed "the mouse" and also "the omnipresent" for his innate ability to always be present everywhere. He was skilled and quick on the pitch.

=== Secretary of Real Madrid ===
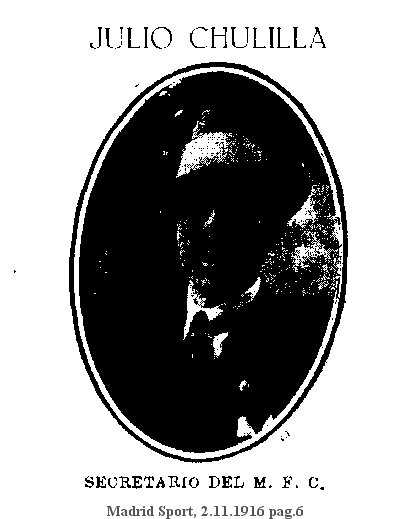
Julio Chulilla, the secretary of Madrid FC, in 1916.

In 1912 he stopped competing and the club demanded more responsibility from him: the secretariat, a position that he held for over a decade, between 1912 and 1924. At that time, the secretary's office was in a room in his own house.

=== Real Madrid publisher ===
Since the sole activity of secretary of Madrid FC would not have allowed him to support a family, Chulilla opened a printing press on 46 Pelayo Street called Tipografía Hispana, where the sports magazine Madrid Sport began to be published. According to his son, "he had many clients since he was small in stature but big in heart and knew how to attract customers who had become numerous". The work increased and in 1921 he partnered with Felipe Angel Rodríguez, also a member of Real Madrid, and they moved to Calle Torrecilla del Leal, no. 17, with the commercial name of Chulilla y Angel.

The magazine Madrid Sport did not only deal with sport but also with the family life of athletes and members, announcing weddings, anniversaries, meetings, Et cetera.

In 1921, Julio Chulilla Gazol entered into a partnership with Felipe Angel Rodríguez, another founding member of Madrid FC - membership number 31 -, opening a new, larger printing shop to meet the growing demand, with the company name " Chulilla y Angel" in Calle Torrecilla of Leal, 17 in Madrid. In this printing house, in addition to printing the official magazine of Real Madrid FC, Madrid Sport, and all the material needed by the sports club, the first edition of the novel "Fermín Galán (Romance de ciego)" by Rafael Alberti was printed in 1931 and also works in Esperanto by Francisco Azorin Izquierdo. Just as art books were printed such as Jiménez Aranda's critical-biographical essay on Bernardino de Pantorba (pseudonym of José López Jiménez) from 1930 enriched with 55 illustrations.

In 1936, when the Civil War had already begun, political leaflets for the youth of the Republican left were also printed in this printing house.

== See also ==
- List of Real Madrid CF players
