= Martínez Campos =

Soccer stadium in Madrid, Spain

- Full name: Paseo Martínez Campos
- Location: Madrid, Spain

Construction
- Opened: 1918
- Closed: 1930

Tenant
- Racing de Madrid (1918—1930)

Martínez Campos was the home stadium of Racing de Madrid between 1918 and 1930. They played before in Campo de Hermosilla for 1 year, and in Campo de La Exposición for 3 years. In 1930 Racing de Madrid moved to play their home games in Campo de Fútbol de Vallecas for another 2 years before dissolving in 1932.

Martínez Campos hosted the 1919 Copa del Rey Final when Arenas Club de Getxo won the cup with a 5–2 scoreline against FC Barcelona.
