= Eusebio Blanco =

Spanish footballer

Personal information
- Full name: Eusebi Blanco i Añaños
- Date of birth: 17 September 1896
- Place of birth: Barcelona, Spain
- Date of death: 22 April 1982 (aged 85)
- Place of death: Lleida, Spain
- Position: Midfielder

Senior career*
Years	Team	Apps	(Gls)
1916–1917	FC Espanya		
1917–1921	Barcelona		
1921–1923	FC Espanya		
1923–1925	Martinenc		
1925–1927	Lleida		

International career
1918	Catalonia	1	(0)
- * Club domestic league appearances and goals

Eusebi Blanco i Añaños (17 September 1896 – 22 April 1982) was a Spanish footballer who played as a midfielder for FC Espanya and Barcelona. After retiring, he became renowned jeweller.

== Playing career ==
=== Club career ===
Born on 17 September 1896 in Barcelona, Blanco began his career in his hometown club FC Espanya in 1916, aged 20, and after only one season, he was signed by FC Barcelona in 1917, remaining there for four years until 1921, playing his last match for the club in a friendly against Cardiff Corinthians on 4 May. In total, he played 19 official matches for Barça, helping the club win back-to-back Catalan championships in 1919 and 1920, and to reach the final of the 1919 Copa del Rey on 18 May, which he played in an eventual 5–2 loss in extra-time. A week later, on 25 May, he started against the Catalan national team in a tribute match to the runner-ups, which ended in a 1–0 win.

On 9 June 1918, Blanco was the subject of a tribute match, along with Pepe Rodríguez; Barcelona defeated CE Europa 4–1. In 1921 he returned to Espanya, where he played two more seasons until 1923, when he moved to Martinenc, where he played a further two seasons. In 1925 Blanco signed for Lleida, a club where he had already played a match on loan in 1924, and in doing so, he became the first professional player to play in the city.

== Later life and death ==
Upon retiring, Blanco founded the Blanco jewelry store in the city of Lleida, which was the most important in the province. He later became vice-president of the Lleida delegation of the Catalan Athletics Federation, and a member of the management committee that led the UE Lleida in 1962.

Blanco died in Barcelona on 22 April 1982, at the age of 85.

== Honours ==
FC Barcelona

- Catalan championship
  - Champions (2): 1918–19 and 1919–20
- Copa del Rey
  - Runner-up (1): 1919
