= National Committee of Referees =

Football Committee of Referees in Spain

- Established: 2 July 1922
- Affiliations: Royal Spanish Football Federation (11 July 1922)
- Location: Madrid, Spain

The National Committee of Referees (Spanish: Comité National de Árbitros), also known as Technical Committee of Referees, directly attends to the functioning of the federative collective of referees and is responsible, under subordination to the president of the RFEF, for the government, representation, and administration of the functions attributed to them. It is in charge of the operation and organization of the Spanish arbitration world. Of course, it is the body in charge of appointing matches or promotions of referees, assistant referees, match delegates, and football and futsal reporters in national categories. Likewise, it is the body in charge of communicating to FIFA the selection of international referees and assistants each season.

== History ==
This federative technical body in charge of the arbitration field has had different names throughout its almost 100 years of existence. At the first start of football in Spain, the refereeing aspect was regulated by the different regional federations that, under subjective criteria, appointed the referees and maintained the refereeing organization. At first, the matches were refereed by managers or players from the competing clubs. Later it passed to the regional federations, and in the 1920s a federative body was definitively created to unify criteria at the Spanish state level.

=== Denominations ===
There have been three names by which the highest refereeing body in Spanish football has been known. From its beginnings until the end of the Spanish Civil War, it was called the National Committee of Referees (CNA). After the war, it changed to a name that well-defined the verticality of the regime, the Central Committee of Referees (CCA). In the 1960s the name of the National Committee of Referees (CNA) was recovered, and in 1993 after the arrival of Sánchez Arminio to the presidency, the body was named the Technical Committee of Referees (CTA), a name that remains to this day.

Denominations:

- National Committee of Referees (CNA)
- Central Committee of Referees (CCA)
- National Committee of Referees (CNA)
- Technical Committee of Referees (CTA)

== Features ==
The Technical Committee of Referees is regulated in the Statutes of the RFEF in Title VI (Of the bodies of the RFEF), Chapter 4 (Of the technical bodies), in its Section 1 (Of the Technical Committee of Referees). Subsequently, this body is developed more deeply in the General Regulations of the RFEF.

It is responsible for the operation, organization or designation of soccer and futsal referees in national categories. In football, this would mean that the CTA is in charge of everything related to referees, except for their assignment in professional leagues (Primera, Segunda, and Segunda B), which, as stated in point 5 of the RFEF Statutes, Arbitration appointments are made by a Committee in charge of the league and the RFEF. The Tercera División, despite being a category initially recognized as national, is a mixed category, in which most of the regulation is transferred to the autonomous federations, so the same thing happens arbitrarily and its regulation, except for some issues, It remains under autonomous organization.

These provisions of the RFEF Statutes were subsequently developed in the General Regulations of the RFEF, such as designations, members and their actions, the National School of Football Referees (ENAF), and Et cetera.

=== Autonomous committees ===
Another function of the CTA is that of the regulatory and supervisory body of the technical arbitration committees of the different autonomous federations. The different regional technical committees that are dependent on their respective federations and the CTA itself are listed below:

- (Andalusia) Andalusian
- (Aragon) Aragonese
- (Asturias) Asturian
- (Balearic Islands) Balearic
- (Cantabria) Cantabrian
- (Castilla–La Mancha) Castilian-Manchego
- (Castile and León) Castilian-Leonese
- (Andalusia) Andalusian
- (Ceuta) Ceuti
- (Extremadura) Extremeño
- (Galicia (Spain)) Galician
- (Canary Islands) Las Palmas
- (Community of Madrid) Madrileño
- (Melilla) Melillense
- (Region of Murcia) Murciano
- (Navarre) Navarrese
- Riojan
- (Canary Islands) Tenerife
- (Valencian Community) Valencian
- (Basque Country (autonomous community)) Basque

Notas:

^{1} The Canary Islands Committee is divided into two insular delegations: Las Palmas and Tenerfeño.

== Presidents ==
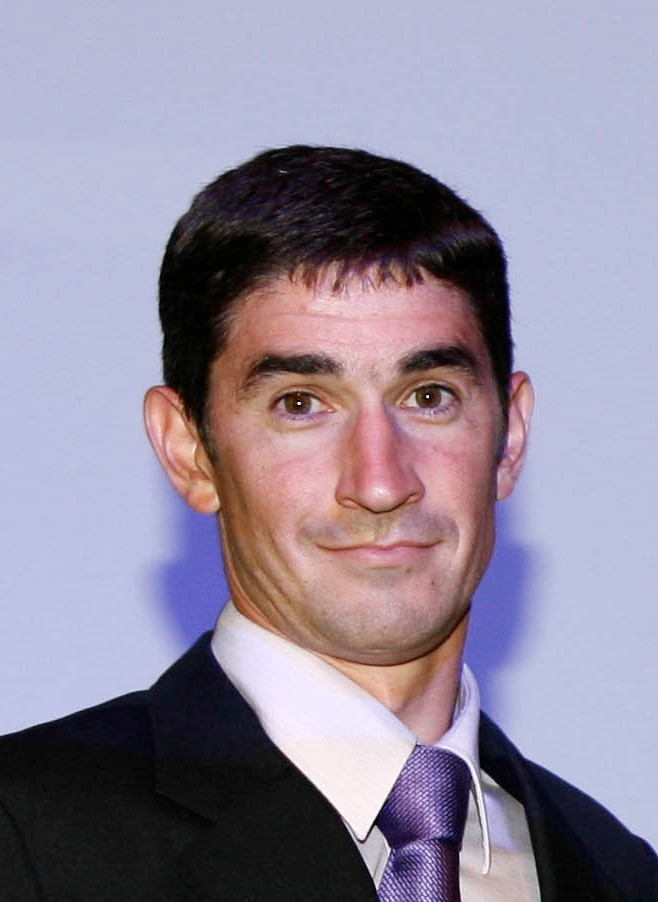
Alberto Undiano Mallenco, one of the referees with the most matches in Spanish football.

Below are listed chronologically all the presidents that this arbitration body has had since its creation:

- Alfonso Albéniz
- Carlos Dieste
- Luis Colina (1924–26)
- Antonio de Cárcer (1926–28)
- Luis Iglesias (July 1928)
- Julián Ruete (September 1928 – November 1928)
- Alfonso Albéniz (1928–29)
- Antonio de Cárcer (1930–36)
- Eulogio Aranguren (1939–46)
- Manuel Álvarez (1946)
- Emilio Suárez (1947)
- Ramón Echarren Sanzmagaray (1947–48)
- Pedro Escartín (1948–51)
- Luis Saura del Pan (1951–52)
- Arturo Espinosa (1952)
- Eulogio Aranguren Labairu (1952–53)
- Emilio Álvarez Pérez (1953–56)
- Nivario de la Cruz Hernández (September 1956 – November 1961)
- Manuel Asensi (1961-67)
- José Plaza Pedraz (1967-70)
- José Fernández de la Torre (1970)
- Juan Francisco Pardo Hidalgo (1971–72)
- José Plaza Pedraz (1972–1990)
- Francisco Javier Lorente Pérez (07/05/1990 – 06/07/1990)
- Fernando de Andrés Merino (1990)
- Pedro Sánchez Sanz (1990 – 15/03/1993)
- Victoriano Sánchez Arminio (15/03/1993 – 23/05/2018)
- Carlos Velasco Carballo (23/05/2018 – December 2021)
- Luis Medina Cantalejo (December 2021 – June 2025)

== Organizational chart ==
Organizational chart of this federative technical body:

- President
  - Luis Medina Cantalejo
- Vicepresidents
  - Xavier Moreno Delgado
  - David Fernández Borbalán
  - Bernardino González Vázquez
- Deputy to the presidency
  - Antonio Rubinos Pérez
- Legal adviser
  - Álvaro Sergio Álvarez Pérez
- Secretary
  - Manuel Díaz Morales

Committee for the LFP:

- President
  - Carlos Velasco Carballo
- Vocal
  - Antonio Jesús López Nieto

== Referees squad ==
The referees of the First and Second Division categories in the 2023–24 season are listed below.

== Controversy ==
A possible case of sports corruption is currently being investigated in the Negreira Case, where former vice president José María Enríquez Negreira and members of FC Barcelona would be involved.

On the other hand, from those around the FC Barcelona it has been reported that 10 of its presidents have been partners, directors or players of Real Madrid.
