= Luis Saura =

Spanish footballer, military doctor, and sports leader

Personal information
- Full name: Luis Saura del Pan
- Date of birth: 8 June 1890
- Place of birth: Madrid, Spain
- Date of death: 18 March 1980 (aged 89)
- Place of death: Valencia, Spain
- Position: Forward

Senior career*
Years	Team	Apps	(Gls)
1908–1909	Athletic Club	1	
1909–1910	Vasconia SC		
1911–1917	Madrid FC	19	
10th president of the RFEF
In office 1940–1941
Preceded by	Julián Troncoso
Succeeded by	Javier Barroso
12th president of the National Committee of Referees
In office 1951–1952
Preceded by	Pedro Escartín
Succeeded by	Arturo Espinosa
- * Club domestic league appearances and goals

Luis Saura del Pan (8 June 1890 – 18 March 1980) was a Spanish footballer who played as a forward for Athletic Bilbao and Madrid FC. He served as both the 10th president of the Spanish Football Federation between 1940 and 1941, and the 12th president of the National Committee of Referees from 1951 to 1952.

== Playing career ==
=== Early career ===
Luis Saura del Pan was born in Madrid as the son of Pedro Saura y Coronas (1851–1943), a doctor, and Luisa del Pan. He developed a deep interest for football from a young age and became a Real Madrid member in 1905, at the age of 15. However, it was with Athletic Bilbao that he began his football career in 1908, scoring once in the only Copa del Rey match that he played for the club, a 2–4 loss to Club Ciclista in the quarterfinals of the edition.

Saura then joined Real Sociedad, which participated in the 1910 Copa del Rey under the umbrella of local club Vasconia Sporting Club (since the club was not a year old as the tournament statutes required), and in his first season with the club, Saura del Pan helped the club reach the final, which ended in a 0–1 loss to his former club, Athletic Bilbao, courtesy of a goal from Remigio Iza.

=== Madrid FC ===
Saura stayed at Madrid FC for five seasons between 1912 and 1917. In his first season in 1912–13, he played only one cup match, starting as a forward in the semifinals against his former club Athletic Bilbao, which ended in another loss, this time by 0–3. In the following season, he scored twice in four matches in the regional championship, and after a two-year hiatus, he returned for the 1916–17 season, playing four cup matches and scoring once, in a 1–3 loss to FC Espanya in the second leg of the semifinals. Saura did not play the subsequent replay, which ended in a 2–2 draw, but then played in the second replay, helping his side to a 1–0 victory, thus reaching the 1917 cup final against Arenas Club. Despite forming an attacking partnership with René Petit and Sotero Aranguren, the match ended in a goalless draw, and he was then not called up for the replay which Madrid won 2–1.

== Later life ==
During the years of the Second Spanish Republic (1931–39), Saura was a military doctor, national category referee, and secretary of the National Committee of Referees.

In 1940, Saura was appointed as the 10th president of the Spanish Football Federation (replacing Julián Troncoso), a position that he held for one year until 1941, when he was replaced by Javier Barroso.

In 1951, the 61-year-old Saura was appointed as the 12th president of the National Committee of Referees, replacing Pedro Escartín. By the time he reached this position, he had been registered as a Real Madrid member for almost 50 years, since 1905. He held the presidency for one year until 1952, when he was replaced by Arturo Espinosa.

== Death ==
Saura died in Valencia on 18 March 1980, at the age of 89.

== Honours ==
Real Sociedad

- Copa del Rey:
  - Runners-up: 1910 (Note: as Vasconia.)

Real Madrid

- Copa del Rey:
  - Winners: 1917
