= Arsenio Comamala =

Spanish footballer (born 1888)

Personal information
- Full name: Arsenio Comamala López-Del Pan
- Date of birth: 1891
- Place of birth: Barcelona, Spain
- Date of death: 1976 (aged 84-85)
- Place of death: Unknown
- Position: Midfielder

Senior career*
Years	Team	Apps	(Gls)
1903–1911	FC Barcelona		
1911–1912	Madrid FC		
1912	Universitary SC		
1912–1913	Casual SC		
1913–1914	Madrid FC		

International career
1912	Catalonia	1	(0)
- * Club domestic league appearances and goals

Arsenio Comamala López-Del Pan (1891 – 1976) was a Spanish footballer who played as a midfielder for FC Barcelona and Madrid FC. He is best known for being one of the first players to have featured for both FC Barcelona and Madrid FC.

His brothers Carles and Áureo were also footballers, who both also played for Barcelona.

== Football career ==
=== Club career ===
Born in Barcelona, Arsenio began his career at his hometown club FC Barcelona in 1903, together with his brother, Carles. They played for Barça until 1911, being part of the club's first great team in the early 1910s, which had the likes of Massana, Amechazurra, Peris, Paco Bru and the Wallace brothers (Charles and Percival). He helped this side win the Catalan championship three times in a row between 1909 and 1911, along with two Pyrenees Cups (1910 and 1911), and one Copa del Rey in 1910, starting in the final where he helped Barça to a 3–2 comeback win over Español de Madrid.

In 1911 some Barcelona players left the club due to financial differences, including the Comamala brothers, but while Carles signed for Universitary SC, Arsenio joined Madrid FC, but eventually also joined Universitary in 1912, and shortly before the end of the year, both joined Casual SC, together with other Barcelona dissidents such as José Quirante and the Wallace brothers. In doing so, Comamala became one of the first players to feature for both FC Barcelona to Madrid FC, alongside the likes of Alfonso Albéniz, Quirante, Charles Wallace, Enrique Normand, Walter Rozitsky, and José Berraondo.

In 1913 Casual folded due to financial reasons, but while Carles decided to retire, Arsenio returned to Madrid FC, where he played one cup match in the 1912–13 season and one Centro regional match in the following season before retiring in 1914.

=== International career ===
On 18 November 1909, Comamala made his international debut at the Camp de la Indústria, on the occasion of a benefit match for the injured people in the Second Melillan campaign, starting for Equip Blanc (White Team) alongside the likes of Francisco Bru, Emilio Sampere, and his brother Carles; he helped his side to a 6–2 victory over the Catalan national team, which marked Catalonia's first match after a three-year hiatus.

On 8 December 1912, Comamala earned his only cap for the Catalan national team at the Camp de la Indústria, on the occasion of a benefit match for the Union of Journalists, helping his side to a 5–2 victory over a Selection of foreigners who played in Spain.

== Athletic career ==
In addition to football, Comamala also stood out in athletic events, such as the 100m dash. For instance, in December 1908, when the RCD Espanyol organized a sports party to benefit the Provincial House of Charity, which took place at the AC Galeno field located next to the Clinical Hospital, Comamala participated in a 100-meter foot sprint race, in which he narrowly lost to Enrique Peris; the first two were awarded gold and silver medals. Then there was another foot race, this time of 1,000 meters (four and a half laps around the field), in which Comamala also participated along with his former FC Barcelona teammate Matias Colmenares, who was now with AC Galeno.

== Personal life ==
In 1918, Comamala married Montserrat Valls i Martí, the daughter of Josep Maria Valls, co-owner of Banca Fills de Magí Valls. His wife was great-aunt of former French Prime Minister Manuel Valls. The couple had two children, Víctor and Romà Comamala i Valls.

== Honours ==
FC Barcelona

- Catalan championship:
  - Champions (4): 1904–05, 1908–09, 1909–10 and 1910–11
- Pyrenees Cup:
  - Champions (2): 1910 and 1911
- Copa del Rey:
  - Champions (1): 1910
