= Áureo Comamala =

Spanish footballer

Personal information
- Full name: Áureo Comamala López-Del Pan
- Date of birth: Unknown
- Place of birth: Barcelona, Catalonia, Spain
- Date of death: 9 September 1936
- Place of death: Barcelona, Catalonia, Spain
- Position: Defender

Senior career*
| Years | Team | Apps | (Gls) |
| 1909–1912 | FC Barcelona | 11 | (0) |
| 1912 | FC Casual | | |
| 1912–1917 | University SC | | |
- * Club domestic league appearances and goals

Áureo Comamala López-Del Pan was a Spanish pharmacist and footballer who played as a defender for FC Barcelona in the 1910s.

His brothers Carles and Arsenio also played football for FC Barcelona, and he was the least successful of the three.

== Biography ==
Comamala was born in Barcelona as the son of Alfonso Comamala and Maria de la Concepcion López del Pan. He began his football career in 1909 with his hometown club, FC Barcelona, and although he played three seasons for them, he only played one official competitive match, in the 1910–11 Catalan championship. By playing in this match, Sagi was part of the squad that then won the 1911 title. Later he played briefly at Casual SC in 1912, before joining Universitari SC, where he retired in 1917.

Comamala married Albina Malo de Silva Braganza (1895–1933) in July 1919, in the Josepets church in a ceremony at which his brother Carles also married, this one with Leonor Victoria de Lacea y Mazarredo (1890–1936).

Comamala then moved to live in Puigcerdà, where he ran his pharmacy and pharmaceutical laboratory. He then adventured himself into politics, becoming a councilor in Gerona for the Patriotic Union party, founded by the dictator Miguel Primo de Rivera. Comamala was murdered in the first days of the Spanish Civil War, in a mass killing in Urtx, in a place known as Correc del Gavatx, in which 21 people died, many of whom, like Comamala, had belonged to the Patriotic Union, among them a former mayor, Ramon Cosp i Esteve, and several former councilors of the city council.

== Honours ==
FC Barcelona

- Catalan championship:
  - Champions (1): 1910–11
