= Manuel Obón =

Spanish footballer

Personal information
- Full name: Manuel Obón Salido
- Date of birth: 28 August 2002 (age 24)
- Place of birth: Paiporta, Spain
- Height: 1.93 m (6 ft 4 in)
- Position: Goalkeeper

Team information
- Current team: Arenas Getxo

Youth career
- Almería

Senior career*
Years	Team	Apps	(Gls)
2021–2024	Almería B	40	(0)
2024–2025	Orihuela	13	(0)
2025–2026	Zaragoza B	10	(0)
2026	Zaragoza	1	(0)
2026–	Arenas Getxo	0	(0)
- * Club domestic league appearances and goals as of 31 May 2026

Manuel Obón Salido (born 28 August 2002) is a Spanish footballer who plays as a goalkeeper for Arenas Club de Getxo.

== Career ==
Born in Paiporta, Valencian Community, Obón represented UD Almería as a youth, and made his senior debut with the reserves on 12 September 2021, in a 0–0 Tercera División RFEF away draw against CD Huétor Tájar. After spending his first season as a backup to Diego Fuoli, he was a regular starter in his second.

Obón was again a second-choice during the 2023–24 campaign, acting as a backup to Bruno Iribarne as Almería B achieved promotion to Segunda Federación. On 1 August 2024, he moved to Orihuela CF also in the fourth division.

On 9 July 2025, Obón joined another reserve team, Deportivo Aragón still in division four. He made his first team debut the following 31 May, coming on as a half-time substitute for Adrián Rodríguez in a 2–0 Segunda División home loss to Málaga CF, as Zaragoza was already relegated.

On 23 June 2026, Obón signed for Primera Federación side Arenas Club de Getxo.
