= Javier Barroso =

Spanish footballer, sports leader, and architect (1903–1990)

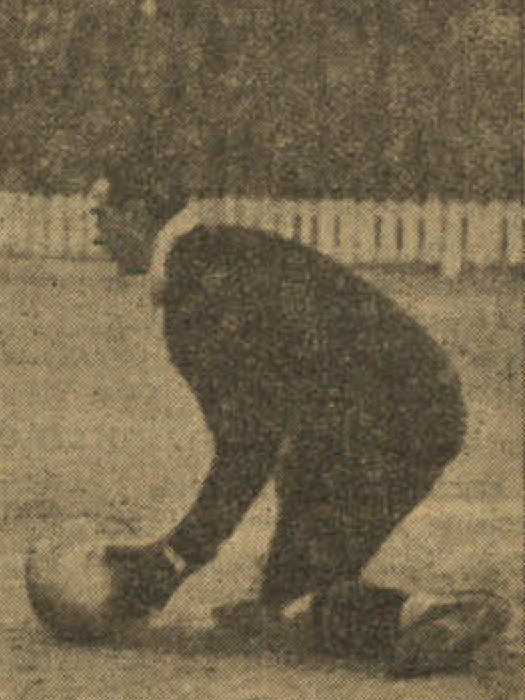
- Barroso making a save as Atlético's goalkeeper in a regional championship match

Personal information
- Birth name: Javier Barroso Sánchez-Guerra
- Date of birth: 3 December 1903
- Place of birth: Madrid, Spain
- Date of death: 10 September 1990 (aged 86)
- Place of death: Madrid, Spain
- Position: Goalkeeper

Senior career*
Years	Team	Apps	(Gls)
1919–1921	Real Madrid		
1921–1927	Atlético Madrid		
11th President of the Spanish Football Federation
In office 15 August 1941 – 14 April 1946
Preceded by	Luis Saura
Succeeded by	Jesús Rivero
20th President of Atlético Madrid
In office 14 December 1955 – 7 January 1964
Preceded by	Jesús Suevos
Succeeded by	Vicente Calderón
- * Club domestic league appearances and goals

Javier Barroso Sánchez-Guerra (3 December 1903 – 10 September 1990) was a Spanish footballer who played as a goalkeeper for Atlético Madrid in the 1920s, and who later coached the team in 1932. He then served as the 11th president of the Spanish Football Federation from 1941 to 1946, as well as Atlético's 20th president between 1955 and 1964.

As an architect, he was involved in the construction of both the Santiago Bernabéu and the Vicente Calderón Stadiums.

== Sporting career ==
=== Playing career ===
Born in Madrid on 3 December 1903, Barroso began his career at his hometown club Real Madrid in 1919, aged 16, where he stayed for two years, until 1921, playing in only two official matches, both in the 1919–20 Centro Regional Championship, which was won by Madrid. Perhaps unsatisfied with his lack of playing time, he joined city rivals Atlético Madrid in 1921, with whom he played for six years, until 1927, playing a total of 46 matches and helping his side win the 1924–25 Centro Championship.

=== Managerial career ===
After retiring, Barroso remained linked to Atlético, serving as one of its directors for three years, from 1931 until 1934, and even as its coach in early 1932, overseeing 13 matches in the Segunda División, which ended in 6 wins, one draw, and 6 losses.

=== President of the RFEF and Atlético ===
On 15 August 1941, Barroso replaced Luis Saura as the new president of the Spanish Football Federation, a position he held for nearly five years, until 14 April 1946, when he resigned following the Antúnez case between Real Betis and Sevilla, being replaced by Jesús Rivero. Having taken over the presidency just two years after the end of the Spanish Civil War, he was tasked with rebuilding the governing body of Spanish football, to whom he provided a structure that was both more modern and solid.

A few years later, on 11 December 1955, Barroso was named the 20th president of Atlético Madrid by its General Meeting, winning the election with 123 votes against Alfonso de Lafuente's 77. Three days later, on 14 December, he officially replaced Jesús Suevos as the club's new president, a position that he held for over eight years, until 7 January 1964, when he resigned due to an economic and sporting crisis, being replaced by Vicente Calderón, whom Barroso had brought onto his board of directors.

Under his presidency, Atlético won the 1960 and 1961 Copa del Reys. In 1961, he promoted the abandonment of the Estadio Metropolitano de Madrid and initiated the construction of a new field called the Estadio Manzanares, which he designed together with Miguel Ángel García-Lomas Mata, a future Mayor of Madrid (1973–1976); this stadium was completed by his successor, thus being later renamed as the Vicente Calderón Stadium.

In 1983, Barroso was named Atlético's honorary president by the club's members.

== Architect career ==
In 1944, Barroso, together with fellow architect Pedro Muguruza, who was also a former Atlético goalkeeper, were part of the jury that chose the design for the new Santiago Bernabéu Stadium. He also designed several barracks for the Civil Guard.

Between 1941 and 1947, Barroso worked on the renovation and expansion of the Ministry of Justice headquarters, and in 1945, he and Francisco Cánovas del Castillo carried out a second extension of the Palacio de la Equitativa. He also designed the Antonio de Nebrija College at the Complutense University of Madrid in 1951.

From 1964 until 1967, he designed the INEF headquarters (1964–67), this time taking a distinctly contemporary approach that contrasts with his earlier work.

== Death ==
Barroso died in Madrid on 10 September 1990, at the age of 86.
