= Félix Sesúmaga =

Spanish footballer (1898–1925)

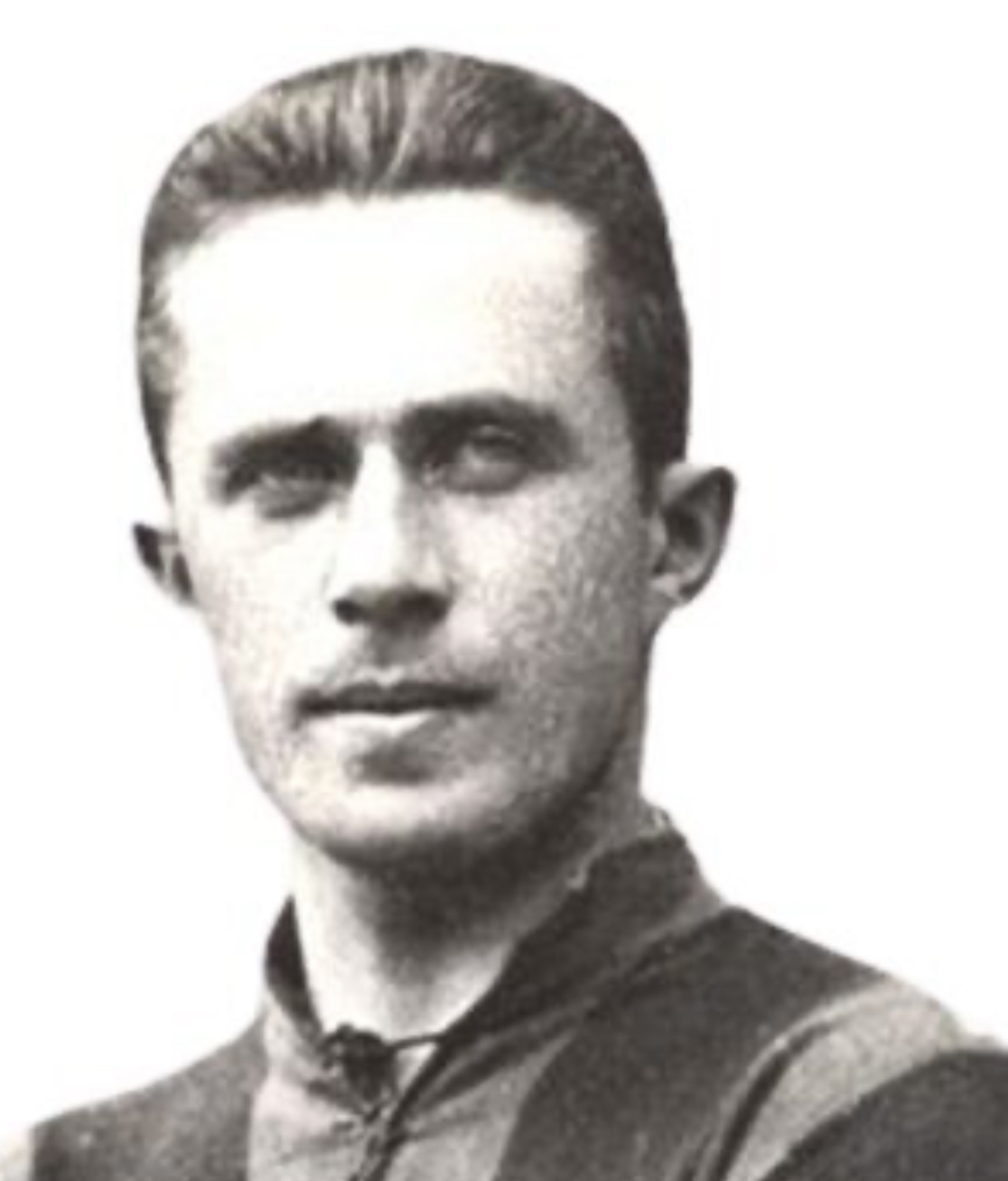

Personal information
- Full name: Félix Sesúmaga Ugarte
- Date of birth: 12 October 1898
- Place of birth: Leioa, Spain
- Date of death: 24 August 1925 (aged 26)
- Height: 1.70 m (5 ft 7 in)
- Position: Forward

Senior career*
Years	Team	Apps	(Gls)
1914–1919	Arenas		
1919–1921	FC Barcelona	212	(51)
1921–1922	Racing de Sama		
1922–1924	Athletic Bilbao		

International career
1920–1923	Spain	8	(4)
1922–1924	Biscay		
Medal record
Men's football
Representing Spain
Olympic Games
Silver medal – second place	1920 Antwerp	Team competition
- * Club domestic league appearances and goals

Félix Sesúmaga Ugarte (12 October 1898 – 24 August 1925) was a Spanish (Basque) footballer who played as a forward for Arenas Club de Getxo, FC Barcelona, Racing de Sama de Langreo, Athletic Bilbao and Spain.

Sesúmaga won the Copa del Rey three times with three different clubs and also played in two back-to-back finals for two different clubs. In 1920 Sesúmaga was a member of the first Selección that played at the Olympic Games in Antwerp.

Sesúmaga’s playing career was shortened by tuberculosis, to which he succumbed on August 24, 1925, at only 26 years old.

== Club career ==
Born in Leioa, Biscay, Sesúmaga began his career in 1914 at neighboring club Getxo Arenas. His goalscoring performances proved crucial to help Arenas reach the Copa del Rey final on two occasions (1917 and 1919). In the 1919 final he scored a hat-trick against FC Barcelona as they won 5–2, contributing decisively to the only Cup title in the history of Arenas, while also becoming in only the third player to manage a hat-trick in a Copa del Rey final after Pichichi in 1915 and Félix Zubizarreta in 1916, both for Athletic Bilbao.

Barcelona were impressed enough to sign him still in 1919 and Sesúmaga didn't lose his goalscoring instinct in Catalonia, helping his new club reach the 1920 final and beat Athletic Bilbao 2–0. In doing so, he emulated the feat of the French René Petit, who had also won the Cup two consecutive seasons with different teams. He was a member of a legendary Barcelona team, coached by Jack Greenwell, that also included Paulino Alcántara, Sagi-Barba, Ricardo Zamora and Josep Samitier. During his time at the club he also helped them win three Championat de Catalunya titles. After a season at Racing de Sama de Langreo, he joined Athletic Bilbao and with them, he managed to win another Copa del Rey, his third, after beating CE Europa 1–0 in the 1923 Copa del Rey Final.

== International career ==
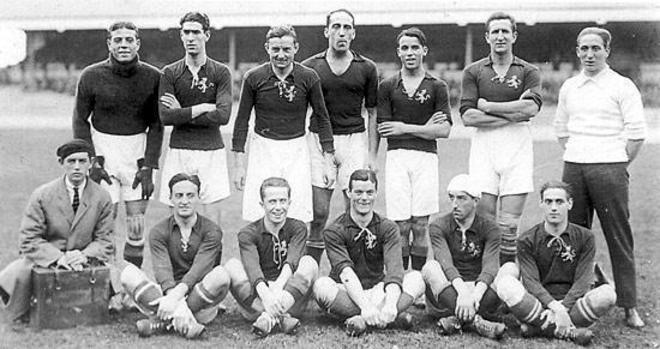
at the 1920 Summer Olympics

On 28 August 1920, Sesúmaga went down in history as one of the eleven footballers who played in the first game of the Spain national team at the 1920 Summer Olympics, in an eventual 1–0 victory over Denmark. He didn't play in the quarter-finals against Belgium, and without him, Spain lost 1–3, meaning they would now dispute the silver medal in the repechage tournament, in which he was not side-lined again, featuring in all three games and scoring four goals, netting twice against Italy to give Spain a 2–0 win, and two more against the Netherlands in the play-off for the silver medal as Spain won 3–1. These goals made him the all-time top scorer of the Spain national team until he was overtaken two years later on 30 April 1922 by Paulino Alcántara. In total, he earned eight caps for Spain, scoring four goals between 1920 and 1923.

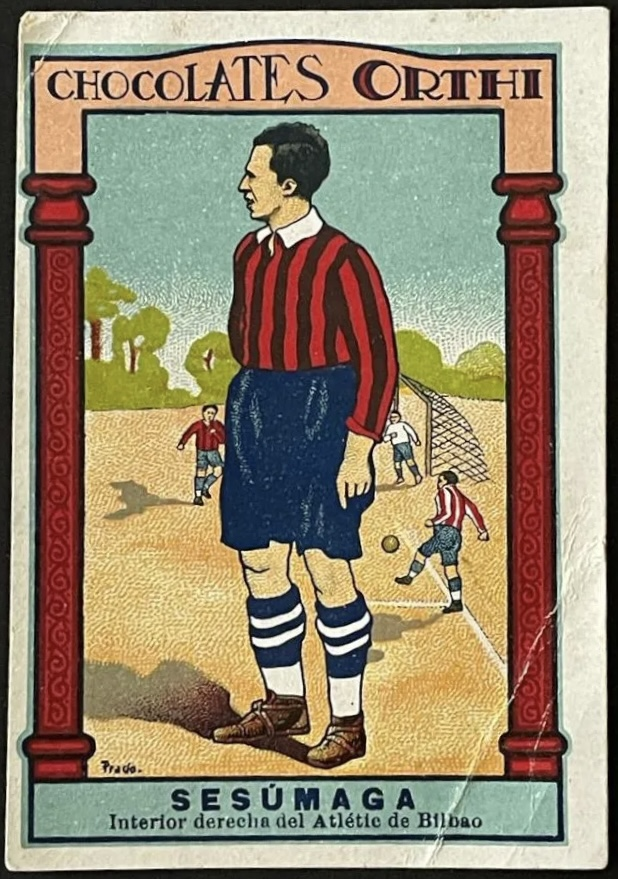
Felix Sesumaga football card representing Spain national team

When he joined Athletic Bilbao in 1922 he became eligible to play for the Biscay autonomous football team representing the local league, and he was a member of the team that participated in the 1922–23 and 1923–24 Prince of Asturias Cup tournaments, an inter-regional competition organized by the RFEF. Biscay was eliminated in the quarter-finals by Asturias in 1922–23, but they achieved revenge in the next edition when they defeated them 4–2 at the same stage (some sources credit Biscay's opening goal to him, but most agree it was scored by Carmelo).

== Illness and death ==
Sesúmaga’s playing career was cut short by a diagnosis of tuberculosis. No longer able to play, he managed Racing Club de Madrid in the 1924-1925 season. During that time, several clubs stood in solidarity with him and held tribute matches to raise funds to subsidize his medical treatments. The Spanish National Assembly, in fact, granted him a subsidy to pay for the expenses. In 1925 he completely left football and entered a Bilbao sanatorium. He died on August 24, 1925, at the age of 26.

=== International goals ===
Spain score listed first, score column indicates score after each Sesúmaga goal.

List of international goals scored by Félix Sesúmaga
No.	Date	Venue	Opponent	Score	Result	Competition
1	2 September 1920	Atotxa Stadium, San Sebastián, Spain	Italy	1–0	2–0	1920 Summer Olympics Silver medal tournament Semi-final
3	2 September 1920	Atotxa Stadium, San Sebastián, Spain	Italy	2–0	2–0	1920 Summer Olympics Silver medal tournament Semi-final
2	5 September 1920	Reina Victoria, Seville, Spain	Netherlands	1–0	3–1	1920 Summer Olympics repechage tournament Final
4	5 September 1920	Reina Victoria, Seville, Spain	Netherlands	2–0	3–1	1920 Summer Olympics repechage tournament Final

== Honours ==
Arenas Club de Getxo

- Copa del Rey: 1919
- Campeonato Norte: 1916–17

FC Barcelona

- Copa del Rey: 1920
- Catalan Championship: 1918–19, 1919–20, 1920–21

Athletic Bilbao

- Copa del Rey: 1923
- Campeonato de Viscaya: 1922–23

Spain

- Olympic Games: Silver medallist 1920
