= Francisco Estévez =

Spanish composer

- Born: Francisco Estévez Diaz; 1945 (age 80–81); Dakhla, Western Sahara (then Villa Cisneros, Spanish Sahara)
- Other name: Paco
- Spouse: Cuqui

Francisco Estévez (Paco) is a Spanish composer who gained recognition for his avant-garde and electronic work during the 1970s when he trained in classical composition techniques, and performed with Florian Schneider and Karl Bartos of Kraftwerk. He holds degrees and has received awards in Spain, Germany, and the Netherlands. He currently (as of 2016) lives in Collado Villalba near Madrid.

Paco was the original organizer of the youth orchestra Orquestra de Jovenes Virtuosos.

The first attempt to catalogue his work was published in 2016.

He was awarded a 2016 Barlow Endowment music commission.
