= Sócrates Quintana =

Spanish footballer (1891–1984)

Personal information
- Full name: Sócrates Quintana Montoto
- Date of birth: 18 December 1891
- Place of birth: Mieres, Asturias, Spain
- Date of death: 28 February 1984 (aged 92)
- Position: Midfielder

Senior career*
Years	Team	Apps	(Gls)
1910–1915	Sociedad Gimnástica		
1915–1918	Athletic Club de Madrid		

International career
1915–1918	Madrid	+6	(0)
Medal record
Madrid
Prince of Asturias Cup
Silver medal – second place	1916 Prince of Asturias Cup	Team
Gold medal – first place	1917 Prince of Asturias Cup	Team
- * Club domestic league appearances and goals

Sócrates Quintana Montoto (18 December 1891 – 28 February 1984), was a Spanish artist and footballer who played as a midfielder for Sociedad Gimnástica and Athletic Club de Madrid. He was one of the most important footballers in the amateur beginnings of Sociedad Gimnástica, being one of the main architects of the team's football power in Madrid, competing head-to-head against the likes of Madrid FC and Racing de Madrid.

In addition to being an artist and footballer, he also practiced athletics, a specialty in which he came to hold the national record in the 800 metres run and in the 110 meters hurdles.

== Early life ==
Born in a small town in Asturias, Quintana grew up there until the age of 8, when in 1900, he moved with his family to Madrid, the city in which he began to play football and his artistic training. In 1905 he was forced to abandon his studies for family reasons and began to work as a temporary worker in the General Directorate of Debt and Passive Classes in the Spanish finances, an institution in which he will continue working until his retirement, without ever abandoning artistic and sporting activity.

== Club career ==
Quintana began his career with Sociedad Gimnástica in 1910, with whom he played for 4 seasons, featuring alongside José Carruana and the Uribarri brothers (Eulogio and Ricardo). He played a pivotal role in the club's two Centro Championship titles between 1909 and 1911, plus a third one in 1913–14. He also helped his side to reach the 1912 Copa del Rey Final, which ended in a 0–2 loss to FC Barcelona.

In 1915, Quintana joined Athletic Club de Madrid, forming a great midfield partnership with Miguel Mieg and featuring alongside the likes of Pagaza and the Villaverde brothers (Fernando and Senén). He retired in 1918.

== International career ==
Like many other Athletic Madrid players of that time, he was summoned to play several matches for the Madrid national team during the 1910s, however, due to the little statistical rigor that the newspapers had at that time, the exact amount of caps he earned is unknown. He is one of the few players to have represented Madrid in the four initial editions of the Prince of Asturias Cup between 1915 and 1918, an inter-regional competition organized by the RFEF, finishing as runner-up in 1916 and winning in 1917 and 1918, although he never came off the bench on the latter. In the 1917 edition, he formed a great partnership with the team's captain José María Castell and fellow Athletic teammate Miguel Mieg in the midfield, which was a fundamental piece to claim the Prince of Asturias Cup trophy for the first time in the capital side's history.

== Athletic career ==
In addition to football, Quintana also stood out in athletic events, being considered the second Spanish record holder in the 800 metres run, which he set as a member of the Sociedad Gimnástica on 6 April 1914, when he broke the previous record set by Francisco Cruzate in 1900. He also held the national record in the 110-meter hurdles.

== Artistic career ==
In 1919, he applied to the Board for the Expansion of Scientific Studies and Research for a pension that would allow him to improve his training and travel abroad, which was granted to him in 1921, allowing him to travel for a year in France, Great Britain, Germany and Italy. On his return to Spain, he focused on poster design, painting, and xylography, a technique he had learned during his stay in London, and he also began to collaborate as an illustrator in the Revista de Occidente. He came to illustrate hundreds of books throughout his life, most using photogravure and lithography techniques. He spent the years of the Civil War separated from his family and due to his work in the Ministry of Finance of the Government of the Republic, he was transferred to Valencia, Tarragona and Barcelona.

In subsequent decades, he presented his works in a large number of exhibitions, both individual and collective, achieving critical acclaim. A recognition that translates into numerous awards, among which the Drawing Prize of the National Painting Contest and several awards at the National Exhibition of Fine Arts stand out.

Quintana died in Madrid on 28 February 1984, at the age of 93. His last exhibition was held just a few days before his death, in his hometown of Mieres. Many of his paintings are preserved in Spanish museums and in the Ateneo de Madrid.

== Honours ==
=== Club ===
Sociedad Gimnástica

- Centro Championship:
  - Champions (3): 1909–10, 1910–11 and 1913–14
- Copa del Rey:
  - Runner-up (1): 1912

=== International ===
Madrid

- Prince of Asturias Cup:
  - Champions (1): 1917
  - Runner-up (1): 1916
