= Francisco Pagazaurtundúa =

Spanish footballer

Pagaza
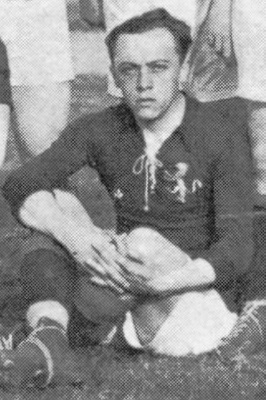
- Francisco Pagazaurtundúa with the Spain National Team in 1920.

Personal information
- Full name: Francisco Pagazaurtundua González-Murrieta
- Date of birth: 22 October 1894
- Place of birth: Santurtzi, Biscay, Spain
- Date of death: 21 June 1976 (aged 73)
- Place of death: Madrid, Spain
- Position: Forward

Senior career*
Years	Team	Apps	(Gls)
1912–1916	Arenas Club		
1916–1918	Athletic Club de Madrid		
1918–1920	Arenas Club		
1920–1923	Racing de Santander		
1923–1924	Gimnástica de Torrelavega		
1924–1927	Racing de Santander		
1927–1928	Racing de Madrid		

International career
1914–1915	Biscay	2	(1)
1915–1916	Basque Country	+3	(1)
1920–1922	Spain	7	(0)
1924	Cantabria	+2	(0)

Managerial career
- 1929-1930: Racing de Santander
- 1930-1931: Osasuna
- 1932-1933: Racing de Santander
- 1933–1934: Real Sporting de Gijón
- 1939–1941: Mallorca
- 1941-1943: Racing de Santander
- 1944-1945: Hércules CF
- 1945-1946: Elche CF
Medal record
Men's football
Spain
Olympic Games
Silver medal – second place	1920 Summer Olympics	Team competition
Basque Country
Prince of Asturias Cup
Gold medal – first place	1915 Prince of Asturias Cup	Team
- * Club domestic league appearances and goals

Francisco Pagazaurtundua González-Murrieta (22 October 1894 – 18 November 1958), better known as Pagaza, was a Spanish footballer who played as a forward. He was a member of the Spanish team that won the silver medal in the 1920 Summer Olympics as well as a Copa del Rey winner with Arenas Club de Getxo.

== Club career ==
Born in Santurtzi to an architect and a piano teacher, Pagaza began playing football at Colegio Orduña and during his time as a student in England. He began his career with Arenas Club in 1912, where he stood as a phenomenal winger, so he was signed by Athletic Club de Madrid in 1916. After two years he returned to Arenas in 1918, where he played a pivotal role in helping the club win the Biscay Championship and the Copa del Rey in 1919, starting in the final as Arenas defeated the powerful FC Barcelona 5-2. At that time living exclusively out of football wasn't easy, and therefore he had a second job, working in the harbor of Santander, which is why he signed for Real Racing Club de Santander in 1920. He also spent a season at Gimnástica de Torrelavega and Racing Club de Madrid, finishing his career with the latter in 1928.

== International career ==
Being an Arenas Club player, he was eligible to play for the Biscay representative team, and he was one of the eleven footballers that played in the team's first-ever game on 13 December 1914 against fellow Basques Gipuzkoa, held at San Mamés, and Pagaza scored the winning goal in a 2-1 victory. During this time he was also summoned to play for the Norte team, a side consisting of Basque players including Cantabria, but usually featured only players from the Basque provinces of Biscay and Gipuzkoa, each of which also organized their own representative matches occasionally such as the one mentioned before. Pagaza was one of the eleven footballers that played in Norte's first-ever game on 3 January 1915 against Catalonia, and once again he scored in a 6-3 win.

In May 1915, he was selected to represent the Norte team in the first edition of the Prince of Asturias Cup, an inter-regional competition organized by the RFEF. He played both games as the Basque team secured the first-ever trophy of the competition with a win over Catalonia and a draw with the Centro team (a Castile/Madrid XI).

He also represented Spain in the nation's international debut at the 1920 Summer Olympics, being one of the eleven footballers who participated in Spain's first-ever victory (1-0) over Denmark on 28 August 1920. He featured in all of Spain's first four internationals at the Summer Olympics, but missed the decisive game against the Netherlands, which saw Spain win 3-1 to win the silver medal. In total, he earned seven caps for Spain, four at the 1920 Olympics and three in friendlies, the last of which was on 17 December 1922 at Estádio do Lumiar in Lisbon in a 2-1 win over Portugal.

When he joined Racing de Santander, he become eligible to play for the Cantabria representative team, and he was one of the eleven footballers that played in the team's first-ever game on 9 March 1924, but this time he failed to score in a 3–0 win over Aragon. This means he was a member of the first-ever line-ups of four different teams, Biscay, Norte (Basque Country), Cantabria and Spain.

== As a manager ==
After his retirement as a player, he began a career as a coach. He coached Racing de Santander thrice, as well as the likes of Osasuna (1930-1931), Real Sporting de Gijón (1933-1934), Mallorca (1939-1941), Hércules CF (1944-1945) and Elche CF (1945-1946).

== Honours ==
=== Club ===
Arenas Club

- Biscay Championship
  - Winners (1): 1918–19
- Copa del Rey
  - Champions (1): 1919

Racing de Santander

- Cantabrian Championship
  - Champions (4): 1922–23, 1924–25, 1925–26 and 1926–27

=== International ===
Spain

- Summer Olympics:
  - Silver medal (1): 1920

Basque Country

- Prince of Asturias Cup:
  - Champions (1) 1915
