= José Manuel Kindelán =

Spanish footballer (1887–1919)

Personal information
- Full name: José Manuel Kindelán Duany
- Date of birth: 8 October 1887
- Place of birth: Cádiz, Andalusia, Spain
- Date of death: 9 November 1919 (aged 32)
- Position: Defender

Senior career*
Years	Team	Apps	(Gls)
1908–1909	Español de Madrid		
1910–1915	Sociedad Gimnástica		
1915–1916	Atlético Madrid		
- * Club domestic league appearances and goals

José Manuel Kindelán Duany (8 October 1887 – 9 November 1919) was a Spanish referee and footballer who played as a defender for Atlético Madrid.

== Playing career ==
Born in Cádiz, Kindelán moved to Madrid as a child, and eventually, he joined Español de Madrid in 1908, helping the club win its first piece of silverware, the 1908–09 Centro Championship, and then reached the 1909 Copa del Rey final, which they lost 3–1 to Club Ciclista.

His great campaign with Español earned him a move to Sociedad Gimnástica in 1909, where he featured alongside the likes of José Carruana and Sócrates Quintana. Kindelán once again played an important role in the first piece of silverware of a club, this time contributing to Gimnástica winning the 1909–10 Centro Championship, and again in 1910–11 and 1913–14. In 1912, he helped Gimnástica reach which still remains the only Copa del Rey final in the club's history, which they lost 2–0 to FC Barcelona. On 9 December 1912, Kindelán of Gimnástica played a friendly match for Valencia's Club Hispania against Madrid FC, which ended in a 3–1 loss.

Kindelán remained loyal to the club until 1915, when he left for Atlético Madrid, with whom he played for just one year before retiring at the end of the 1915–16 season.

== Refereeing career ==
Kindelán began his refereeing career when he was still an active player, which was normal at the time; for instance, in the 1912–13 Centro Championship, he refereed the opening match between Madrid FC and Atlético Madrid, which ended in a 3–3 draw on 16 February 1913, and then two weeks later, on 2 March, he played in that same tournament for Gimnástica alongside his brother in a 5–0 loss to Madrid. Another example of this took place at the 1912 Copa del Rey, where he refereed the semifinals between FC Barcelona and FC Espanya on 31 March, which ended in a 3–0 win to the former, and then on the following day, on 1 April, he played and score in Gimnástica's semifinal tie to help his side to a 4–2 victory over Sporting Club de Irún. This was actually his second cup match as referee, having previously refereed one in the 1910 FECF edition, again involving FC Barcelona, but this time with Sala Calvet, which ended in a 5–0 win to the former.

On 1 November 1912, Kindelán oversaw a friendly match between Madrid FC and Sporting Club de Irún on the occasion of the inauguration of the Campo de O'Donnell, with the match itself being recorded as belonging to the 'Excelsior Cup' and ending in a draw. He refereed his last cup match in the 1913 FECF edition on 16 March, a preliminary round between FC Espanya and Vigo FC.

In 1914, Kindelán was among those who formed the College of Referees of the Central Regional Federation, which was the first College of Referees in Spain. Together with the likes of Manuel Prast, Alfonso Albéniz, and Julián Ruete, he was a member of the college's first constitution on 15 April 1914. However, he resigned from the position just a few weeks later, on 9 May, to become one of the first category referees, and whose most important task was to referee the matches of the Central Championship, and if available, the Copa del Rey.

== Honours ==
Club Español de Madrid

- Centro Championship: 1908–09
- Copa del Rey runner-up: 1909

RS Gimnástica

- Centro Championship: 1909–10, 1910–11, 1913–14
- Copa del Rey runner-up: 1912
