= Arenas Club de Getxo =

Association football club in Spain

Arenas Club
- Full name: Arenas Club de Getxo
- Nickname: El Histórico
- Founded: 1 July 1909; 117 years ago as Arenas Foot-ball Club
- Stadium: Campo Municipal de Gobela
- Capacity: 2,000
- President: Mikel Barandala
- Head coach: Jon Erice
- League: Primera Federación – Group 1
- 2025–26: Primera Federación – Group 1, 11th of 20
- Website: arenasclub.com
Home colours	Away colours

Arenas Club de Getxo is a Spanish football club based in the town of Getxo, near Bilbao, in the autonomous community of Basque Country. Founded in 1909, it currently plays in Primera Federación – Group 1, holding home games at Campo Municipal de Gobela, with a 2,000-seat capacity. They were winners of the 1919 Copa del Rey, beating Barcelona 5–2.

It was among the pioneering clubs of Spanish football, and in 1928 was a founding member of La Liga, alongside neighbouring Athletic Bilbao, Real Sociedad and Real Unión. Only Real Unión has remained a consistent rival since then due to both of their downfalls from the top flight.

== History ==
=== Origins of local football ===
The area of Greater Bilbao was deeply connected to Britain due to its iron ore mines and industry. Don Manuel, a priest in the local parish of the Las Arenas neighborhood, would gift balls to local children during Catechism lessons. Some of these boys would go on to study in England and learn about the local game of football. After their return to Getxo, they spread football to nearby neighborhoods.

By 1901, weekly matches were played in the fields of Lamiako by youth from Las Arenas. In 1903, the same group would win the "Copa Athletic", the biggest local tournament at the juvenile level, as well as play a match against Club Ciclista de San Sebastián, the precursor to Real Sociedad. They eventually founded a local team in 1909 (encouraged by the recent creation of the Spanish Federation of Football Clubs) with the name of Arenas Football Club. It was renamed to Club Arenas three years later.

In 1914, they moved their home ground to the local sports club Real Club Jolaseta in the Neguri neighborhood.

=== Early successes ===

In 1912, they started competing in the Campeonato Norte along with Real Sociedad, Athletic Bilbao, Racing de Santander, Sporting de Gijón and Celta, being crowned champion in 1917.

During the 1916–17 season of the Campeonato, all the teams except for Arenas, Athletic, and Real Unión were suspended. The sporting committee of the tournament decided to play only the remaining matches between these three teams. Jolastokieta, one of the suspended teams, was dissolved that year. Arenas lost one match and won another against Unión as well as beating Athletic twice to claim the title. (Note: Union: 2–3 and 2–1 Athletic: 2–0 and 2–0) They then beat Sporting de Gijón in the semi-finals. This qualified them to that year's Copa del Rey, where it reached the final in Barcelona, losing 1–2 against Madrid FC after extra time.

In 1917, a knock-out match in the Spanish Cup between Arenas and Athletic Bilbao had to be suspended after the pitch was stormed by Athletic supporters who were looking to assault the referee for seeming biased against their team.

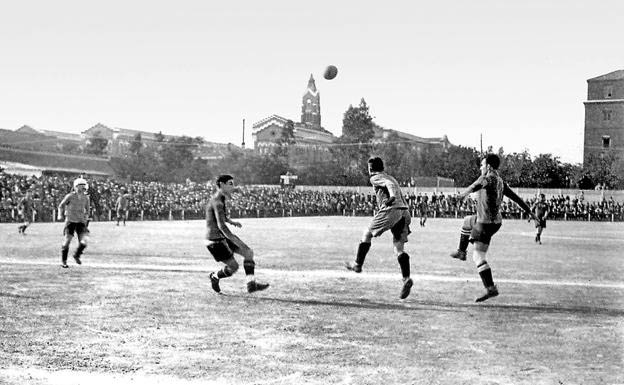
Arenas playing Barcelona in the 1919 Copa del Rey Final

In 1919, Arenas won another regional competition, the Campeonato de Vizcaya, thus qualifying for the Copa del Rey again, and won the national tournament after defeating Barcelona 5–2 in the final, scoring three in extra time. The following year, when the Spain national team were runners-up at their international debut in the Olympic Games, the squad included three players from the club, Francisco Pagazaurtundúa, Félix Sesúmaga, and Pedro Vallana.

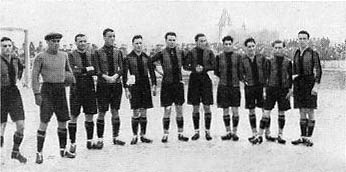
Team of 1927, that year the club played the Copa del Rey final

Arenas Getxo appeared in Spanish Cup finals on two further occasions, losing against Barcelona in 1925 (0–2) and two years later against Real Unión (0–1), the latter in the only all-Basque decisive match in the competition's history not to feature Athletic Bilbao. Every member of the Spanish squad at the 1928 Olympics was with a Basque club, and Arenas provided four of the players.

=== Decline ===
After playing in La Liga's first seven editions – finishing third in 1929–30 – and the following six seasons in the second division, the club has spent the vast majority of its existence competing at the fourth level, with the occasional visit to the regional leagues. In 2015, Arenas gained promotion to the third tier for the first time in 35 years, via the playoffs.

== Season to season ==
Season	Tier	Division	Place	Copa del Rey
1929	1	1ª	5th	Round of 16
1929–30	1	1ª	3rd	Round of 16
1930–31	1	1ª	5th	Semi-finals
1931–32	1	1ª	5th	Round of 16
1932–33	1	1ª	7th	Round of 32
1933–34	1	1ª	10th	Round of 32
1934–35	1	1ª	12th	Sixth round
1935–36	2	2ª	2nd	Round of 16
1939–40	2	2ª	7th	
1940–41	2	2ª	8th	First round
1941–42	2	2ª	7th	First round
1942–43	2	2ª	4th	First round
1943–44	2	2ª	12th	
1944–45	3	3ª	2nd	
1945–46	3	3ª	1st	
1946–47	3	3ª	1st	
1947–48	3	3ª	8th	
1948–49	3	3ª	13th	
1949–50	3	3ª	3rd	
1950–51	3	3ª	10th	

Season	Tier	Division	Place	Copa del Rey
1951–52	3	3ª	16th	
1952–53	3	3ª	10th	
1953–54	3	3ª	3rd	
1954–55	3	3ª	9th	
1955–56	3	3ª	4th	
1956–57	3	3ª	4th	
1957–58	3	3ª	4th	
1958–59	3	3ª	7th	
1959–60	3	3ª	1st	
1960–61	3	3ª	3rd	
1961–62	3	3ª	3rd	
1962–63	3	3ª	2nd	
1963–64	3	3ª	3rd	
1964–65	3	3ª	5th	
1965–66	3	3ª	9th	
1966–67	3	3ª	6th	
1967–68	3	3ª	7th	
1968–69	3	3ª	15th	
1969–70	3	3ª	15th	
1970–71	4	Reg. Pref.	10th	

Season	Tier	Division	Place	Copa del Rey
1971–72	4	Reg. Pref.	6th	
1972–73	4	Reg. Pref.	5th	
1973–74	4	Reg. Pref.	2nd	
1974–75	4	Reg. Pref.	10th	
1975–76	4	Reg. Pref.	2nd	
1976–77	3	3ª	13th	
1977–78	4	3ª	13th	
1978–79	4	3ª	2nd	
1979–80	3	2ª B	18th	
1980–81	4	3ª	2nd	
1981–82	4	3ª	18th	
1982–83	5	Reg. Pref.	1st	
1983–84	4	3ª	6th	
1984–85	4	3ª	11th	
1985–86	4	3ª	13th	
1986–87	4	3ª	12th	
1987–88	4	3ª	13th	
1988–89	4	3ª	14th	
1989–90	4	3ª	17th	
1990–91	4	3ª	10th	

Season	Tier	Division	Place	Copa del Rey
1991–92	4	3ª	8th	
1992–93	4	3ª	8th	
1993–94	4	3ª	6th	
1994–95	4	3ª	19th	
1995–96	5	Terr. Pref.	13th	
1996–97	5	Terr. Pref.	1st	
1997–98	4	3ª	13th	
1998–99	4	3ª	8th	
1999–2000	4	3ª	3rd	
2000–01	4	3ª	7th	
2001–02	4	3ª	9th	
2002–03	4	3ª	10th	
2003–04	4	3ª	10th	
2004–05	4	3ª	7th	
2005–06	4	3ª	5th	
2006–07	4	3ª	11th	
2007–08	4	3ª	12th	
2008–09	4	3ª	12th	
2009–10	4	3ª	15th	
2010–11	4	3ª	7th	

Season	Tier	Division	Place	Copa del Rey
2011–12	4	3ª	14th	
2012–13	4	3ª	2nd	
2013–14	4	3ª	3rd	
2014–15	4	3ª	3rd	
2015–16	3	2ª B	8th	
2016–17	3	2ª B	9th	Second round
2017–18	3	2ª B	12th	
2018–19	3	2ª B	15th	
2019–20	3	2ª B	18th	
2020–21	3	2ª B	6th / 3rd	
2021–22	4	2ª RFEF	5th	
2022–23	4	2ª Fed.	9th	
2023–24	4	2ª Fed.	12th	
2024–25	4	2ª Fed.	1st	
2025–26	3	1ª Fed.	11th	First round
2026–27	3	1ª Fed.		

- 17 seasons in La Liga
- 6 seasons in Segunda División
- 2 seasons in Primera Federación
- 7 seasons in Segunda División B
- 4 seasons in Segunda Federación/Segunda División RFEF
- 61 seasons in Tercera División

=== In regional system ===
Regional league system

Season	Division	Place	Copa del Rey
1913–14	North	5h	
1914–15	North	2nd	
1915–16	North	4th	
1916–17	North	1st	
1917–18	North	3rd	
1918–19	Biscay	1st	
1919–20	Biscay	3rd	
1920–21	Biscay	2nd	
1921–22	Biscay	1st	
1922–23	Biscay	2nd	
1923–24	Biscay	2nd	
1924–25	Biscay	1st	
1925–26	Biscay	2nd	
1926–27	Biscay	1st	
1927–28	Biscay	4th	
1928–29	Biscay	2nd	
1929–30	Biscay	3rd	
1930–31	Biscay	2nd	
1931–32	Biscay	2nd	
1932–33	Biscay	2nd	
1933–34	Biscay	3rd	
1934–35	Basque Cup	3rd	
1935–36	Basque Cup	1st	
1938–39	Biscay	5th	
1939–40	Biscay	4th	

== Current squad ==
As of 27 September 2026

Note: Flags indicate national team as defined under FIFA eligibility rules; some limited exceptions apply. Players may hold more than one non-FIFA nationality.

No.	Pos.	Nation	Player
1	GK	ESP	Manuel Obón
2	DF	ESP	Jon Larrauri
3	DF	ESP	Adrián Lekuna (on loan from Athletic Bilbao)
4	DF	ESP	Eneko Ebro
5	DF	ESP	Julen Zubelzu
6	MF	ESP	Iker García (on loan from Zaragoza)
7	MF	ESP	Julen Lartitegi
8	MF	ESP	Ibon Badiola
9	FW	ESP	José Luis Cortés
10	MF	ESP	Martín Pedroarena
11	MF	ESP	Suso Sánchez
12	DF	ESP	Erlantz Palacín

No.	Pos.	Nation	Player
13	GK	ESP	Hodei Oleaga
14	FW	ESP	Ekaitz Redondo
15	DF	ESP	Beñat Arratibel
16	MF	GEQ	Gael Joel Akogo
17	FW	ESP	Unai Buján
18	MF	ESP	Rubén Torres
20	DF	ESP	Eneko Zabaleta
21	FW	ESP	Iñaki Telletxea
22	DF	ESP	Ander Dufur
23	FW	ESP	Álex Oyón
24	MF	ESP	Álvaro Arnedo
25	GK	ESP	Eric Benítez

=== Youth team ===
Note: Flags indicate national team as defined under FIFA eligibility rules; some limited exceptions apply. Players may hold more than one non-FIFA nationality.

No.	Pos.	Nation	Player
26	MF	ESP	Alan Sanz
27	GK	ESP	Aner Solorzano

=== Out on loan ===
Note: Flags indicate national team as defined under FIFA eligibility rules; some limited exceptions apply. Players may hold more than one non-FIFA nationality.

No.	Pos.	Nation	Player
—	MF	ESP	Gonzalo Amado (at Peña Sport until 30 June 2027)

== Honours ==
- Copa del Rey: 1919

Runners-up: 1917, 1925, 1927

- Tercera División: (Note: Third tier) 1945–46, 1946–47, 1959–60
- North Regional Championship / Biscay Championship: 1916–17, 1918–19, 1921–22, 1924–25, 1926–27, 1935–36
- Copa Vasca: 1935–36

== Famous players ==
- (Cape Verde) Delmiro
- (Equatorial Guinea) Gorka Luariz
- (Spain) Tomas Agirre
- (Spain) Guillermo Gorostiza
- (Spain) Rafael Eguzkiza
- (Spain) Javier Iturriaga
- (Spain) Raimundo Lezama
- (Spain) Joseba del Olmo
- (Spain) Félix Sesúmaga
- (Spain) Ian Uranga
- (Spain) José María Yermo
- (Spain) José María Zárraga

== Famous coaches ==
- (Spain) Javier Clemente
