= José Carruana =

Spanish footballer (1890–??)

Personal information
- Full name: José Carruana Gálvez
- Date of birth: 1890
- Place of birth: Madrid, Spain
- Date of death: Unknown
- Position: Defender

Senior career*
Years	Team	Apps	(Gls)
1908–1909	Club Español de Madrid		
1909–1910	Madrid FC		
1910–1912	RS Gimnástica		
1912–1913	RCD Espanyol		
1913–1919	RS Gimnástica		

International career
1915-1916	Madrid	+3	(0)
- * Club domestic league appearances and goals

José Carruana Gálvez (1890 - Unknown) was a Spanish footballer who played as a defender for RCD Espanyol, Madrid FC and Sociedad Gimnástica.

== Club career ==
Born in Madrid, Carruana began his career aged just 18, in 1908, at his hometown club Club Español de Madrid, playing a pivotal role in the club's first piece of silverware, the 1908–09 Centro Championship, and then helped Español reach the 1909 Copa del Rey Final, which they lost 1-3 to Club Ciclista. In 1909, He moved to Madrid FC, and played for them for one season. His great displays earned him a move to RS Gimnástica in 1910, featuring alongside the likes of José Manuel Kindelán and Sócrates Quintana. At Gimnástica, Carruana did not lose his way, as he once again played an important role in the first piece of silverware of a club, this time being the 1909–10 Centro Championship, winning it again in 1910–11. In 1912, he helped Gimnástica reach which still remains the only Copa del Rey final in the club's history, which they lost 0-2 to FC Barcelona. He was then signed by RCD Espanyol, but his spell in Catalonia only lasted one season, before returning to Madrid and Gimnástica, winning yet another Centro Championship in 1913–14.

== International career ==
Being a Sociedad Gimnástica player, he was eligible to play for the Madrid national team. He was a member of the Madrid side that participated in the first edition of the Prince of Asturias Cup in 1915, an inter-regional competition organized by the RFEF. Carruana was also a member of the Madrid team that participated in the following edition, in which they finished as runner-ups to Catalonia.

== Honours ==
=== Club ===
Club Español de Madrid

- Centro Championship:
  - Champions (1): 1908–09
- Copa del Rey:
  - Runner-up (1): 1909

-

RS Gimnástica

- Centro Championship:
  - Champions (3): 1909–10, 1910–11 and 1913–14
- Copa del Rey:
  - Runner-up (1): 1912

=== International ===
Madrid XI

- Prince of Asturias Cup:
  - Runner-ups (1): 1916
