= Real Sociedad Gimnástica Española =

Sociedad Gimnástica
- Full name: Real Sociedad Gimnástica Española
- Nickname: Gimnástica de Madrid
- Short name: Gimnástica Española; RS Gimnástica; SGE
- Founded: 2 March 1887
- Dissolved: c. 1950
- Stadium: Estadio de Diego de León, Madrid
- League: Campeonato Regional Centro
Home colours

Real Sociedad Gimnástica Española (RSGE), also known as Gimnástica de Madrid, was a sports club based in Madrid, Spain. It was officially founded as an amateur gymnastics club on 2 March 1887 by Narciso Masferrer under the name "Sociedad Gimnástica Española".

The club's football section started activities in 1907, winning four Centro Championships (1910, 1911, 1912, 1914). In 1915 King of Spain, Alfonso XIII, granted the club Royal title, therefore the institution changed its name to "Real Sociedad Gimnástica Española". The football section was dissolved in 1928, and the whole club years later.

Apart from the sports mentioned above, Sociedad Gimnástica hosted a large list of activities such as athletics, basketball, boxing, fencing, field hockey, mountaineering, Olympic weightlifting, road bicycle racing, rowing, swimming, and wrestling.

== History ==
=== Early years ===
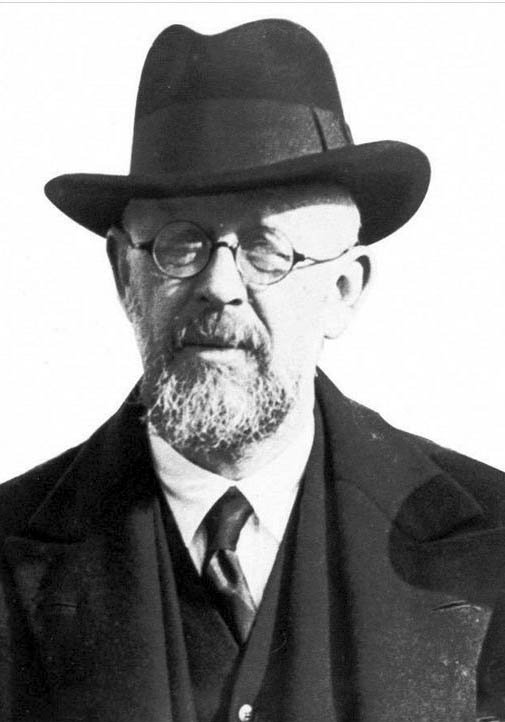
Narciso Masferrer, one of the founders of SGE

The sports club was founded on 2 March 1887 in Madrid by Narciso Masferrer, one of the greatest pioneers of sport in Catalonia. Although the club was founded in 1887, Gimnástica was not officially established until 1889. Its partners grew to 25 in the first year and its initial headquarters were in a small gym owned by Mariano Ordax in Prado, later moving to a basement at Marqués de Leganés, which was known as "the cave" since that was the name of the street until 1894.

In June 1894 the Sociedad Gimnástica Española (SGE) adhered by letter to the first-ever Olympic Games meeting held in Paris in November 1894 convened by Pierre de Coubertin. It was the only Spanish sports society to do so, being one of only two Spanish representatives together with the three delegates sent by the University of Oviedo. The connection of some members of the SGE (such as Narciso Masferrer) with the Olympic committee would be a constant in their lives. In addition to Masferrer, a key figure in the SGE was Marcelo Sanz, its director, general secretary of the Spanish Gymnastics Federation, director of the Physical School of Madrid and in 1912, he became Secretary of the Spanish Olympic Committee.

=== Football team ===
The SGE was born with gymnastics as its center of interest, but with a clear multi-sports vocation that was reflected in the following years as they created sections for several sports: fencing, wrestling, boxing, weightlifting, cycling, hiking and mountaineering, rugby, athletics, basketball, hockey, swimming, rowing and, of course, football, whose section was formed in mid-1907, and it quickly became one of Madrid's benchmarks. Previously there was a company called Club Retiro that turned out to be the embryo of the SGE's football section, with Gimnástica incorporating several of its most prominent athletes and footballers such as Miguel Pradilla and Julián Valls.

On 19 February 1908, the Sociedad Gimnástica Española absorbed Hispania FC, a football team founded in 1902 who was struggling to survive, and the newly created SGE's football section took advantage of it to incorporate several of its most prominent players, and moreover, the Campo de los Altos del Hipódromo began to be used exclusively by Gimnástica, a venue that due to its size, was also used for the rest of the entity's outdoor sports. At this point, the football section was ready to face the big Madrid clubs, playing its first federated competition match in the 1907–08 Centro Championship at the Campo de la Avenida de la Plaza de Toros, losing to Madrid FC (now Real Madrid) by four goals to one, with the section's first-ever goal being netted by Manuel Morales. This result proved to be decisive in the outcome of the tournament since the SGE's football team ended as runner-ups to Madrid FC by just one point. In the first excursion that the section made outside the province of Madrid, they traveled to Vigo to dispute the Iberian Contest of the Count of Torre Cedeira, which they won.

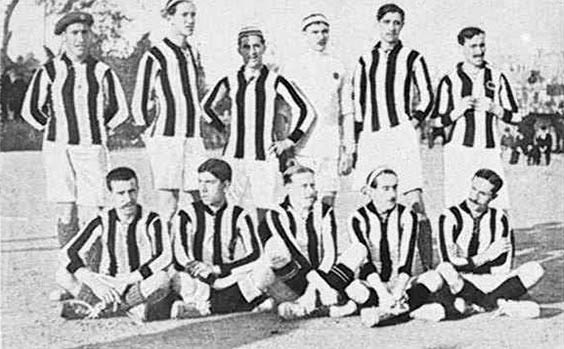
A Sociedad Gimnástica team of 1910

Sociedad Gimnástica was among the founders of the Spanish Football Federation on 14 October 1909, with four of its members accepting managerial positions at the federation: Emilio Coll was elected vice president and Narciso Masferrer a member, while José Manuel Kindelán was elected as General Secretary and Ramón Paz as treasurer. At the end of August 1910, the football section of the SGE was established. The elected board of directors was as follows: President, Joaquín Rodríguez; Accounting Secretary, Sócrates Quintana; Treasurer, Ramón Paz; Members: first, José Manuel Kindelán; second, Julio Barrena; third, Tomás González; fourth, Francisco Baonza and fifth, Felipe Monis.

At the turn of the decade Sociedad Gimnástica, propelled by the likes of José Carruana, the Uribarri brothers (Eulogio and Ricardo) and Sócrates Quintana, began to disrupt the monopoly of Madrid FC and Athletico Madrid, competing head-to-head with them and winning the Centro championship on four occasions, three of which in a row between 1910 and 1912 and a fourth in 1913–14. As the champions of Madrid, Sociedad Gimnástica represented the capital in the national cup twice, reaching the final in the 1912 Copa del Rey, which ended in a 0–2 loss to FC Barcelona.

The Gimnástica football team continued disputing the Regional Championships until 1927–28, but with much less glory and splendor. In the 1926–27 season, Gimnástica and Unión Sporting occupied the penultimate and last places respectively of the Central Regional Championship, and between the two they had to dispute who would play against the champion of Category B, CD Nacional de Madrid. The unionists won after 3 games and Gimnástica had to play two qualifying games against Nacional, being defeated and relegated. The Gimnástica football team broke up in 1928 after the advance of professionalism in Spain, as the entity was unable to bear the costs of the players.

=== Later years ===
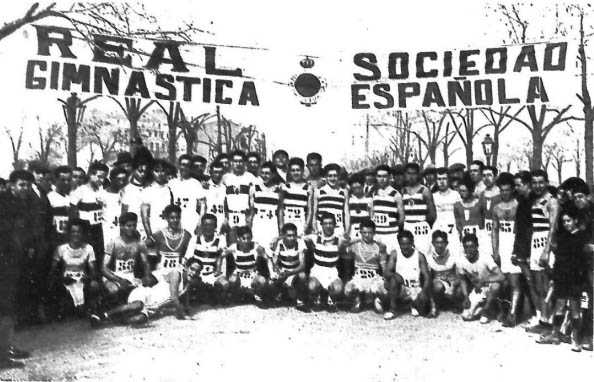
Athletes of RSGE in 1926

In 1916 King Alfonso XIII granted the club the title of Real (Royal). When the outdoor sports sections arrived, it was necessary to leave “the cave” and acquire a sports field on Hilarión Eslava street, on the land now occupied by the Casa de las Flores, previously they had used another in Altos del Hippodrome (1908).

In 1932 the RSGE was also among the architects of the refoundation of the Spanish gymnastic federation, which was formed in 1898 but dissolved years later.

The rugby team was the Spanish champion of the sport in 1935 after winning the Copa del Rey de Rugby which at the time was valid as a national championship, beating the university team of Valencia 11–3 in the final.

=== Decline and Collapse ===
In 1950 Sociedad Gimnástica won the Copa Stadium, a recognition established in 1923 to reward those who have distinguished themselves for the promotion of sport in the country. However, Gimnástica had already ceased to exist by then, as its aims and structure were no longer compatible with the Francoism that was reshaping Spanish sport. In fact, there is no mention of the club after World War II.

== Notable players ==
- Apolinario Rodríguez
- Sócrates Quintana
- Severiano Goiburu

== Honours ==
=== Football ===
- Campeonato Regional Centro
  - Winners (3): 1909–10, 1910–11, 1913–14
  - Runners-up (1): 1907–08
- Copa del Rey
  - Runners-up (1): 1912

=== Rugby ===
- Copa del Rey de Rugby
  - Winners (1): 1935
