= Biscay Championship =

- Organising body: North Football Federation (since 1913)
- Founded: 1913
- First season: 1913
- Folded: 1940
- Country: Spain
- Feeder to: Copa del Rey
- Last champions: Athletic Club (16th title)
- Most championships: Athletic Club (16 titles)

The Biscay Regional Championship (Campeonato Regional de Vizcaya), also called the North Regional Championship (Campeonato Regional Norte) in its early editions, was an official football tournament in Spain organised by the North Football Federation.

It was played annually between 1913 and 1940 and served to elect the representatives of the region in the Spanish Cup, which at that time served as the overall annual national championship.

== History ==
The tournament was launched in 1913, following the creation of the North Football Federation (Federación Norte), initially consisting of clubs from the Basque provinces (Biscay, Gipuzkoa and Álava) and Cantabria (then the province of Santander). The first edition of the Northern Regional Championship started on 12 October 1913, with six teams: three from Biscay (Athletic Bilbao, Arenas Club de Getxo and Deportivo de Bilbao) and three from Gipuzkoa (Real Sociedad, Sporting de Irun and Racing de Irun – the latter two would soon merge as Real Unión). Athletic was the first champion.

In 1916 the Royal Spanish Football Federation permitted the clubs from the province of Santander to abandon the North Federation and join the new Cantabrian Regional Federation of Football, along with clubs from the province of Oviedo. But the situation was reversed again two years later.

After several disagreements between the clubs of Biscay and Gipuzkoa, culminating in a pivotal championship match between Athletic and Real Sociedad being abandoned, in 1918 the National Committee of the Spanish federation agreed to divide the Northern Federation in these two regions. Thus, in the 1918–19 season the Gipuzkoa clubs launched their own championship while the North Championship teams continued with other Basque teams and the return of Racing de Santander, representing the Cantabrian clubs.

In 1922 the clubs in the province of Santander finally left the North Federation to create its own umbrella organisation, which launched the Cantabrian Regional Championship. That same year, the Assembly of the Northern Federation agreed to the change of name to the Biscay Federation (Federación Vizcaína), being composed exclusively of clubs from the province (although Deportivo Alavés of Álava also participated in the championship).

In 1934 the Spanish federation undertook a major restructuring of the national tournaments, so that the regional championships were replaced by the superregional, which gathered the best clubs in various regional federations. In the case of the Basque Country, this was called the Basque Cup, launched in season 1934–35. This tournament was held for two years until being interrupted by the Spanish Civil War.

During the last months of the war in 1939, football resumed activity in some areas controlled by the National side, under the impetus of the Spanish Federation and the regional federations. Five teams participated in the reborn Biscay Championship, including its winners Bilbao Athletic (a team formed by Athletic Bilbao, who decided not to use the club's official title as they only had a makeshift squad and were worried about embarrassing results tarnishing their reputation) and runner-up Barakaldo Oriamendi, who both took part in the 1939 Copa del Generalísimo.

The last edition of the Championship of Biscay, which was also a qualifier for access to the 1940 Copa del Generalísimo, was played in the 1939–40 season. Another restructuring approved by the Spanish Federation in 1940 marked the demise of the regional championships.

== Winners ==
Season	Champion	Copa del Rey (Note: Progress made in the Copa del Rey by qualifiers from the regional championship.)	Runner-up	Copa del Rey (Note: Runners-up also qualified for the Copa del Rey from 1926.)
1913–14 (Note: Included clubs from Biscay, Gipuzkoa and Cantabria and known as the North Championship.)	Athletic Club	Winners	Real Sociedad	N/A
1914–15	Athletic Club	Winners	Arenas Club de Getxo	N/A
1915–16	Athletic Club	Winners	Real Sociedad	N/A
1916–17 (Note: Clubs from Cantabria left the federation and joined the Asturias Championship in 1916–17 and 1917–18.)	Arenas Club de Getxo	Runners-up	Athletic Club	N/A
1917–18	Real Unión (Note: Athletic Club "retired from the competition once finalised" after finishing top of the table.)	Winners	Arenas Club de Getxo	N/A
1918–19 (Note: Included clubs from Biscay, Cantabria and Álava and known as the North Championship.) (Note: Clubs from Cantabria returned to the competition for 1918–19.) (Note: Clubs from Gipuzkoa quit the competition and formed their own from 1918–19 onwards.)	Arenas Club de Getxo	Winners	Racing de Santander	N/A
1919–20	Athletic Club	Runners-up	Arenas Club de Getxo	N/A
1920–21	Athletic Club	Winners	Arenas Club de Getxo	N/A
1921–22	Arenas Club de Getxo	Quarter-finals	Racing de Santander	N/A
1922–23 (Note: Included clubs from Biscay and Álava and known as the Biscay Championship.) (Note: Clubs from Cantabria quit the competition and formed their own from this season onwards.)	Athletic Club	Winners	Arenas Club de Getxo	N/A
1923–24	Athletic Club	Semi-finals	Arenas Club de Getxo	N/A
1924–25	Arenas Club de Getxo (Note: Arenas won a playoff 2–1 against Athletic after both finished level on points.)	Runners-up	Athletic Club	N/A
1925–26	Athletic Club	Group stage	Arenas Club de Getxo	Group stage
1926–27	Arenas Club de Getxo	Runners-up	Athletic Club	Group stage
1927–28	Athletic Club	Group stage	Deportivo Alavés	Semi-finals
1928–29	Athletic Club	Semi-finals	Arenas Club de Getxo	Round of 16
1929–30	Deportivo Alavés	Quarter-finals	Athletic Club	Winners
1930–31	Athletic Club	Winners	Arenas Club de Getxo	Semi-finals
1931–32	Athletic Club	Winners	Arenas Club de Getxo	Round of 32
1932–33	Athletic Club	Winners	Arenas Club de Getxo	Round of 32
1933–34	Athletic Club	Quarter-finals	Barakaldo CF	Round of 32
1934–35 (Note: Member clubs played in the Basque Cup (along with those from Gipuzkoa and Navarre).)	Athletic Club	Round of 16	CA Osasuna	Semi-finals
1935–36	Arenas Club de Getxo	Round of 16	Real Unión	Group stage
1936–1939	No competition due to the Spanish Civil War			
1939 (Note: Reverted to Biscay championship; clubs from Álava moved to the Gipuzkoa Championship.)	Bilbao Athletic	Round of 16	Barakaldo Oriamendi	Semi-finals
1939–40	Athletic Club	Round of 16	Barakaldo Oriamendi	Round of 32

== Summary of Champions ==
Club	Winners	Runner-up	Winning years	Runner-up years
Athletic Club	16 (Note: Athletic Bilbao includes the disputed 1918 championship and the 1939 championship won by Bilbao Athletic in its honours list for a total of 18.)	4	1913–14, 1914–15, 1915–16, 1919–20, 1920–21, 1922–23, 1923–24, 1925–26, 1927–28, 1928–29, 1930–31, 1931–32, 1932–33, 1933–34, 1934–35, 1939–40	1916–17, 1924–25, 1926–27, 1929–30
Arenas Club de Getxo	6	11	1916–17, 1918–19, 1921–22, 1924–25, 1926–27, 1935–36	1914–15, 1917–18, 1919–20, 1920–21, 1922–23, 1923–24, 1925–26, 1928–29, 1930–31, 1931–32, 1932–33
Deportivo Alavés (Note: Only participated from 1922 to 1936 (including Basque Cup).)	1	1	1929–30	1927–28
Real Unión (Note: Only participated from 1913 to 1918 and from 1934 to 1936 (including Basque Cup).)	1	1	1917–18	1935–36
Bilbao Athletic (Note: Only participated in 1939.)	1	–	1939	–
Barakaldo CF	–	3	–	1933–34, 1939, 1939–40
Racing de Santander (Note: Only participated between 1913 and 1916, and between 1918 and 1922.)	–	2	–	1918–19, 1921–22
Real Sociedad	–	2	–	1913–14, 1915–16
CA Osasuna (Note: Only participated in Basque Cup (1934–35 and 1935–36).)	–	1	–	1934–35

== See also ==
- Biscay autonomous football team
- History of Athletic Bilbao
