= 1912 Copa del Rey =

11th Copa del Rey

Tournament details
- Country: Spain
- Teams: 4

Final positions
- Champions: FC Barcelona (2nd title)
- Runners-up: Sociedad Gimnástica

Tournament statistics
- Matches played: 3
- Goals scored: 8 (2.67 per match)

The Copa del Rey 1912 was the eleventh staging of the Copa del Rey, the Spanish football cup competition.

The competition started on 31 March 1912, and concluded on 12 April 1912, with the final, held at the Industria Stadium in Barcelona, in which FC Barcelona lifted the trophy for the second time ever after a 2–0 victory over Sociedad Gimnástica thanks to goals from Alfredo Massana, Pepe Rodríguez. Six teams were planned to take place in the tournament, but Athletic de Bilbao and Academia de Infantería withdrew just before the start of the tournament.

== Semifinals ==
31 March 1912

FC Barcelona	3–0	España de Barcelona
Alfredo Massana; Pepe Rodríguez; Francisco Estévez

Camp de la Indústria, Barcelona
Referee: José Manuel Kindelán
1 April 1912

Sociedad Gimnástica	4–2	Irún Sporting Club
Arturo Espinosa; Ricardo Uribarri; José Manuel Kindelán	Report	Leandro Aguirreche

Camp de la Indústria, Barcelona
Referee: William Hodge

== Final ==
7 April 1912

FC Barcelona	2–0	Sociedad Gimnástica
Alfredo Massana 43'; Pepe Rodríguez 82'	Report

Camp de la Indústria, Barcelona
Referee: John Hamilton

Copa del Rey 1912 Winners
FC Barcelona
2nd title
