= Pérez de Guzmán =

Pérez de Guzmán is a Spanish surname. Notable people with the surname include:

== Duke of Medina Sidonia ==
- Enrique Pérez de Guzmán y Fonseca, 2nd Duke of Medina Sidonia (?–1492), Spanish nobleman
- Juan Alonso Pérez de Guzmán, 3rd Duke of Medina Sidonia (1464–1507), Spanish nobleman
- Enrique Pérez de Guzmán, 4th Duke of Medina Sidonia (?–1512), Spanish nobleman
- Alfonso Pérez de Guzmán, 5th Duke of Medina Sidonia (?–1549), Spanish nobleman
- Juan Alonso Pérez de Guzmán, 6th Duke of Medina Sidonia (1502–1558), Spanish nobleman
- Alonso Pérez de Guzmán, 7th Duke of Medina Sidonia (1550–1615), Spanish nobleman and commander-in-chief of the Spanish Armada
- Juan Manuel Pérez de Guzmán, 8th Duke of Medina Sidonia (1579–1636), Spanish nobleman
- Gaspar Alfonso Pérez de Guzmán, 9th Duke of Medina Sidonia (1602–1664), Spanish nobleman
- Gaspar Juan Pérez de Guzmán, 10th Duke of Medina Sidonia (1630–1667), Spanish nobleman
- Juan Claros Pérez de Guzmán, 11th Duke of Medina Sidonia (1642–1713), Spanish nobleman
- Manuel Pérez de Guzmán, 12th Duke of Medina Sidonia (1671–1721), Spanish nobleman
- Domingo José Claros Pérez de Guzmán, 13th Duke of Medina Sidonia (1691–1739), Spanish nobleman
- Pedro de Alcántara Alonso Pérez de Guzmán, 14th Duke of Medina Sidonia (1724–1779), Spanish nobleman

== Others ==
- Juan Pérez de Guzmán (1240–1285), Spanish nobleman
- Alonso Pérez de Guzmán "el Bueno" (1256–1309), Spanish nobleman
- Fernán Pérez de Guzmán (1376–1458), Castilian nobleman, historian and genealogist
- Enrique Pérez de Guzmán, 2nd Count of Niebla (1391–1436), Spanish nobleman and military figure of the Reconquista
- Pedro Pérez de Guzmán, 1st Count of Olivares (1503–1569), Spanish nobleman
- Juan Pérez de Guzmán y Boza (1852–1934), Spanish bibliophile, politician, and twin brother of the above
- Manuel Pérez de Guzmán y Boza, Spanish nobleman and twin brother of the above
- Manuel Pérez de Guzmán (landowner) (1863–1920), Spanish landowner and sportsperson
- Manuel Pérez de Guzmán (footballer) (1888–1957), Spanish footballer and son of the above
- Francisco Pérez de Guzmán (1889–1970), Spanish footballer, politician, and brother of the above
- José Pérez de Guzmán (1891–1930), Spanish footballer, singer, and brother of the above
- Luis Pérez de Guzmán (1893–1942), Spanish footballer and brother of the above
- Pedro Pérez de Guzmán (1901–1979), Spanish footballer, naval officer, politician, and brother of the above

== See also ==
- Guzmán
