= Luis Guzmán (footballer, born 1893) =

Spanish footballer (1893–1942)

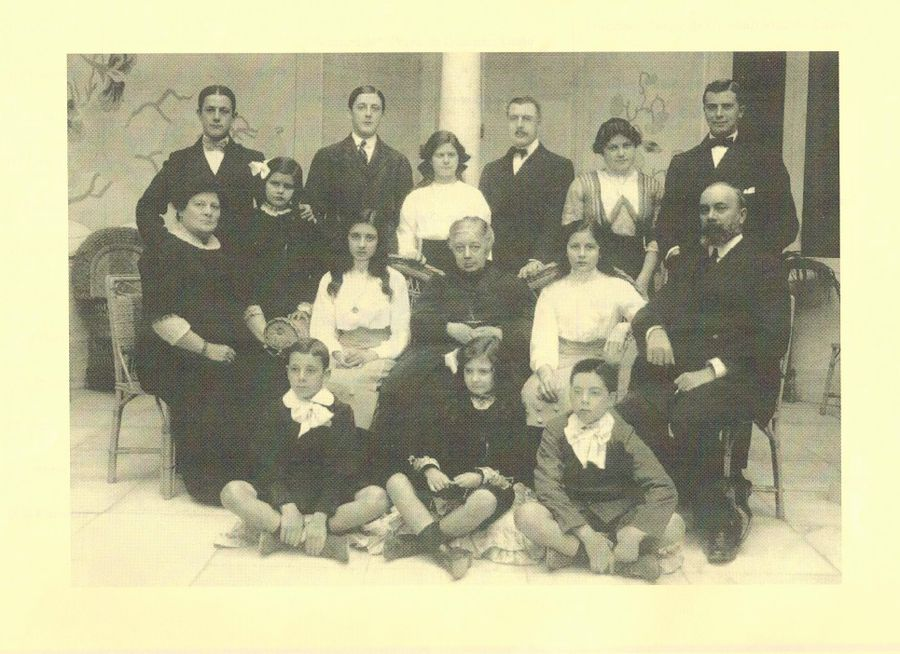
- Luis (standing, first from left) around 1913

Personal information
- Full name: Luis Pérez de Guzmán Urzaiz
- Date of birth: 1893
- Place of birth: Lucena del Puerto, Andalusia, Spain
- Date of death: 24 March 1942 (aged 48–49)
- Place of death: Sevilla, Spain
- Position: Forward

Senior career*
Years	Team	Apps	(Gls)
1906–1915	Recreativo de Huelva		
1909–1911	→ Madrid FC (on loan)		
1911–1912	→ Sociedad Gimnástica (on loan)		
- * Club domestic league appearances and goals

Luis Pérez de Guzmán Urzaiz (1893 – 24 March 1942) was a Spanish footballer who played as a forward for Recreativo de Huelva and Madrid FC in the early 20th century. He was also president of the provincial council of Huelva.

== Early and personal life ==
Luis Pérez de Guzmán was born in the Andalusiann municipality of Lucena del Puerto in 1893, as the fourth son of Manuel Pérez de Guzmán, a landowner, and Maria Teresa de Urzáiz, a native of Moguer.

In 1922, Pérez de Guzmán married Carmen de Torres Ternero in Marchena, and the couple had seven children, Carmen (1924–1981), María Teresa, Luis, María Dolores, Juan (1932–1989), José (1933–1985), and Juana.

== Playing career ==
=== Recreativo de Huelva ===
Like all his brothers, Pérez de Guzmán spent his youth in the sporting environment, instilled by his father, a sports lover; for instance, all of the six Pérez de Guzmán brothers played football at their hometown club, Recreativo de Huelva between 1903 and 1920. When his father became the vice president of Recreativo de Huelva in 1906, he had four of his sons playing for the club, including Luis.

=== Madrid FC ===
In late 1909, Madrid FC, taking advantage of the fact that three of the Pérez de Guzmán brothers (Francisco, José, and Luis) were studying for their university degrees in the Spanish capital, and thus, requested their services, and thus, all of them ended up playing on loan in the ranks of the Madrid FC. Luis and Francisco made their debut for Madrid in the same match, a friendly against Atlético Madrid on 14 November 1909, in which Luis scored an equalizer to help his side to a 2–1 win. Ahead of the first edition of the Copa Rodríguez Arzuaga in January 1910, a friendly tournament, Madrid requested for the services of another player from Huelva, Tomás Estrada, with whom his older brother Francisco started in the opening two matches of the tournament, which ended in a loss to Español de Madrid and a goalless draw with Sociedad Gimnástica, so both were dropped for the third match, with Francisco being replaced by Luis, who scored twice in a 4–1 win over Español de Madrid; however, Madrid finished second behind Gimnástica.

Excluding friendlies, Luis and Francisco played five official matches during the 1909–10 season, three in the Centro Regional Championship (won by Gimnástica), and two in the 1910 Copa del Rey (UECF) (won by Athletic Bilbao). On the latter occasion, Madrid, in addition to already having Luis, Francisco, and Estrada, requested the incorporation of yet another player from Huelva, their brother José, who thus played all together for two matches. In total, Luis played 8 official matches for Madrid between 1909 and 1911.

In the following season, Pérez de Guzmán scored a hat-trick in a friendly on 16 October 1910, to help Madrid to a 5–0 win over Español de Madrid. In January 1911, Luis and Francisco helped Madrid win the second edition of the Copa Rodríguez Arzuaga, starting together in two matches, with Luis playing three. In the 1910–11 regional championship, Luis and Francisco started in all of Madrid's three matches as Gimnástica won the title again.

=== Sociedad Gimnástica ===
For the 1911–12 season, Francisco and Luis played on loan for another Madrid team, Gimnástica, which at the time had a great team, captained by Sócrates Quintana, and with José Carruana and José Manuel Kindelán teaming up on defense, and together, they helped Gimnástica reach the only Copa del Rey final in the club's history in 1912; Luis was a starter in this match, but failed to score in an eventual 0–2 loss to FC Barcelona.

== Death ==
Guzmán died in Sevilla on 24 March 1942, at the age of 39.

== Honours ==
Sociedad Gimnástica

- Copa del Rey:
  - Runner-up (1): 1912

== See also ==
- List of Real Madrid CF players
