= Manuel Pérez de Guzmán =

Manuel Pérez de Guzmán may refer to:

- Manuel Pérez de Guzmán (landowner) (1863–1920), Spanish landowner and sportsperson
- Manuel Pérez de Guzmán, 12th Duke of Medina Sidonia (1671–1721), Spanish nobleman
- Manuel Pérez de Guzmán y Boza (1852–1929), Spanish bibliophile and politician
- Manuel Pérez de Guzmán (footballer) (1888–1957), Spanish footballer
- Manuel de Guzmán y Silva, 8th Duke of Medina Sidonia (1579–1636), Spanish noble
