= Tomás Estrada =

Tomás Estrada may refer to:

- Tomás Estrada Palma, Cuban politician
- Tomás Estrada (footballer), Spanish footballer
