= Francisco Guzmán (footballer) =

Spanish footballer (1889–1970)

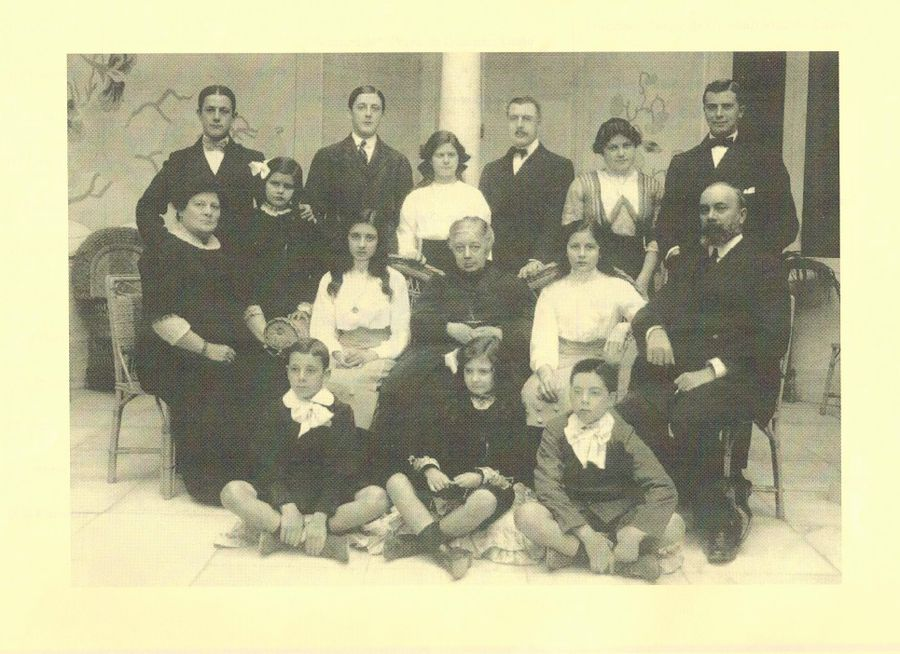
- Pérez de Guzmán (standing, second from left) with his family around 1913.

Personal information
- Full name: Francisco Pérez de Guzmán Urzaiz
- Date of birth: 1 December 1889
- Place of birth: Jerez de los Caballeros, Extremadura, Spain
- Date of death: 31 October 1970 (aged 80)
- Place of death: Huelva, Spain
- Position: Defender

Senior career*
Years	Team	Apps	(Gls)
1906–1915	Recreativo de Huelva		
1909–1911	→ Madrid FC (on loan)		
1911–1912	→ Sociedad Gimnástica (on loan)		
- → Sevilla (on loan)
- * Club domestic league appearances and goals

Francisco Pérez de Guzmán Urzaiz (1 December 1889 – 31 October 1970) was a Spanish footballer who played as a defender for Recreativo de Huelva and Madrid FC in the early 20th century. He was also president of the provincial council of Huelva.

== Early and personal life ==
Francisco Pérez de Guzmán was born in the Extremaduran municipality of Jerez de los Caballeros on 1 December 1889, as the second son of Manuel Pérez de Guzmán, a landowner, and Maria Teresa de Urzáiz, a native of Moguer.

On 27 September 1920, Pérez de Guzmán married in the Church of San Andrés in Seville, to María Dolores Tello Butler, a native of Huelva, but the couple had no children.

== Playing career ==
=== Recreativo de Huelva ===
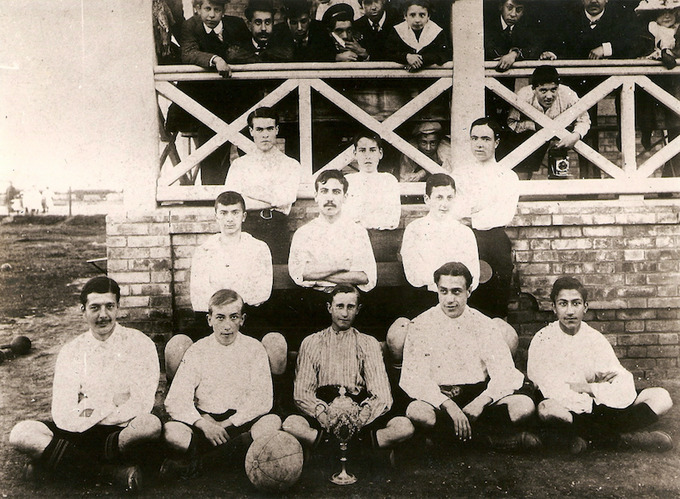
Pérez de Guzmán (standing, first from left) in 1906.

Like all his brothers, Pérez de Guzmán spent his youth in the sporting environment, instilled by his father, a sports lover; for instance, all of the six Pérez de Guzmán brothers played football at their hometown club, Recreativo de Huelva between 1903 and 1920. When his father became the vice president of Recreativo de Huelva in 1906, he had four of his sons playing for the club, including Francisco.

=== Madrid FC ===
In May 1909, three Recreativo players, Francisco, his younger brother José, and Antonio Tellechea, traveled from Huelva to Extremadura, at the request of the recently created CD Badajoz, to reinforce the club in its first-ever match. A few months later, Madrid FC made the same request, taking advantage of the fact that three of the Pérez de Guzmán brothers (Francisco, José, and Luis) were studying for their university degrees in the Spanish capital, and thus, all of them ended up playing on loan in the ranks of the Madrid FC.

Francisco and Luis made their debut for Madrid in the same match, a friendly against Atlético Madrid on 14 November 1909, in which his younger brother scored an equalizer to help his side to a 2–1 win. Ahead of the first edition of the Copa Rodríguez Arzuaga in January 1910, a friendly tournament, Madrid requested for the services of another player from Huelva, Tomás Estrada, with whom Francisco started in the opening two matches of the tournament, which ended in a loss to Español de Madrid and a goalless draw with Sociedad Gimnástica, so both were dropped for the third match, with Francisco being replaced by his younger brother Luis, who scored twice in a 4–1 win over Español de Madrid; however, Madrid finished second behind Gimnástica.

Excluding friendlies, Francisco and Luis played five official matches during the 1909–10 season, three in the Centro Regional Championship (won by Gimnástica), and two in the 1910 Copa del Rey (UECF) (won by Athletic Bilbao). On the latter occasion, Madrid, in addition to already having Francisco, Luis, and Estrada, requested the incorporation of yet another player from Huelva, their brother José, who thus played all together for two matches. In total, Francisco played 8 official matches for Madrid between 1909 and 1911.

On 27 November 1910, Pérez de Guzmán refereed a friendly match between Madrid and Atlético, which ended in a 3–1 win to the former. In January 1911, Francisco and Luis helped Madrid win the second edition of the Copa Rodríguez Arzuaga, starting together in two matches, with Luis playing three. In the 1910–11 regional championship, Francisco and Luis started in all of Madrid's three matches as Gimnástica won the title again.

=== Sociedad Gimnástica ===
For the 1911–12 season, Francisco and Luis played on loan for another Madrid team, Gimnástica, which at the time had a great team, captained by Sócrates Quintana, and with José Carruana and José Manuel Kindelán teaming up on defense, and together, they helped Gimnástica reach the only Copa del Rey final in the club's history in 1912, which ended in a 0–2 loss to FC Barcelona.

In addition to Badajoz and Madrid, some members of the Recreativo first team also played occasionally for the Seville teams, such as Francisco and Alfonso Mata.

== Later life and death ==
At some point, Pérez de Guzmán was the president of the provincial council of Huelva.

Pérez de Guzmán died in Huelva on 31 October 1970, at the age of 81.

== Honours ==
Sociedad Gimnástica

- Copa del Rey:
  - Runner-up (1): 1912

== See also ==
- List of Real Madrid CF players
