= Ildefonso Martínez =

Spanish footballer and colonel (1873–1968)

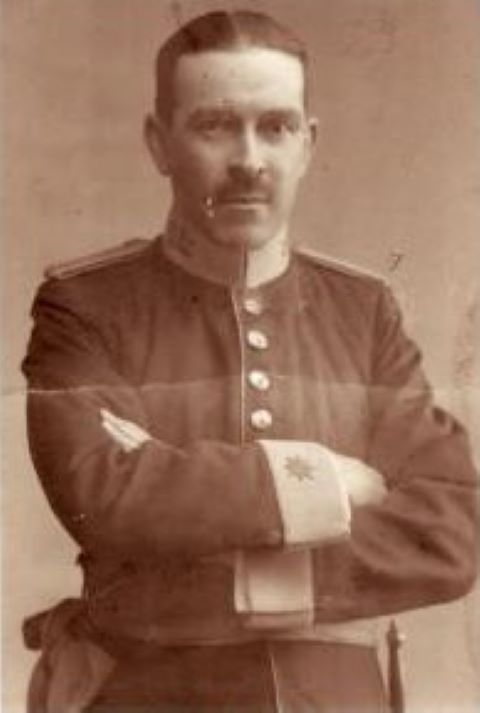
- Martínez as the Lieutenant Colonel of the General Staff in 1922

Personal information
- Full name: Ildefonso Martínez Pérez
- Date of birth: 1873
- Place of birth: La Palma del Condado, Huelva, Spain
- Date of death: 1968 (aged 95)

Senior career*
Years	Team	Apps	(Gls)
1888	Club de Recreo	+1	(0)
- * Club domestic league appearances and goals

Ildefonso Martínez Pérez (1873 – 31 August 1968) was a Spanish footballer who is widely regarded as the first known Spanish football player in history.

Having graduated with the highest qualifications within the military academy, he became not only a military advisor to King Alfonso XII, but also the lieutenant colonel of the general staff, the highest position attainable in the Spanish army.

== Early life ==
Ildefonso Martínez was born in La Palma del Condado, Huelva, in 1873, as the son of Eduardo Martínez, an engineer from Madrid, and Dolores Pérez, who belonged to a wealthy family from La Palma. His father had left the Spanish capital after being hired by German businessmen Guillermo Sundheim to work on constructing the Huelva-Seville railway.

== Sporting career ==
During his youth, Martínez stood out as a great athlete, especially in regattas, but he soon was driven by a strong desire to learn all of these new sports that the British were bringing to Huelva, thus forming close friendships the members of the British colony of Huelva, which allowed him to become familiar with English sports, such as cricket and football, which had been regularly played in Huelva since 1884, the year in which the Scottish doctor William Alexander Mackay created the Sociedad de Juego de Pelota (Spanish: Ball Game Society), which organized games between the mine workers of Rio Tinto and later against crews of English ships that docked in the port of Huelva, which took place in a large area of marshes filled with flooded soil, opposite to the Gas Factory run by fellow Scotsman Charles Wilson Adam. Eventually, football started to gain some followers among the local youth, and as they became familiar with its rules, some of them asked to participate, such as José García Almansa, Alfonso Le Bourg, and Martínez, with the latter taking part in every sport that welcomed him, displaying exceptional skill in football.

The earliest known example of this dates to March 1888, when Mackay sent a letter to Martínez inviting him to play football and cricket matches against the sailors of a merchant ship called Jane Cory on the grounds of the gas factory. He played for a team called Club de Recreo, which was the forerunner of Recreativo de Huelva, founded the following year in December 1889. This invitation means that he already was a regular on the gas factory grounds; even though he was still only 15 at the time, he already had an impressive physique, which he had developed through his rowing in the regattas. The existence of this letter makes Martínez the first documented Spaniard to practice football; the letter remains one of the most important pieces currently exhibited and displayed in the RFEF football museum, who took possession of the original document after it was donated to them by the Martínez family, who did it so for the glory of their ancestor.

Despite some encouraging first steps in football, Martínez ultimately chose to pursue regattas, channeling his athletic abilities into rowing. He seems to have never played for Recreativo, although his name appears in its first-ever list of club members on 20 December 1889.

== Military career ==
Outside sports, Martínez was one of the most esteemed military figures in the Spanish army of his time, completing his military studies with distinction, as he graduated with the highest qualifications within the academy, a fact that allowed him to become the trusted military advisor of King Alfonso XII, becoming the lieutenant colonel of the general staff, the highest position attainable.

== Personal life and death ==
It was played for the love of art, for the ardent defense of colors. Today you see how far we have come! Materialism invades everything.

— Ildefonso Martínez in 1955.

Martínez only married in 1923, at the age of 50, becoming a father to two sons, José Luis and Fernando, who died a few years ago. On 1 February 1955, he gave an interview to Diario Odiel, in which he stated that "already in 1888 my friends and I would go to watch football being played on the blinded marshes where the Gas Factory was, against sailors from the moored steamers that arrived at the port of Huelva".

Martínez died in 1968, at the age of 95.

== Legacy ==
In 2012, Recreativo de Huelva held an event in the antechamber of the Estadio Nuevo Colombino, where his 92-year-old son Jose Luis Martínez received a plaque recognizing his father's historic feat.

Two years later, in December 2014, the American sports media ESPN acknowledged Martínez as "probably the first Spaniard to play football".
