= Pedro Pérez de Guzmán =

Spanish footballer, naval officer, and politician

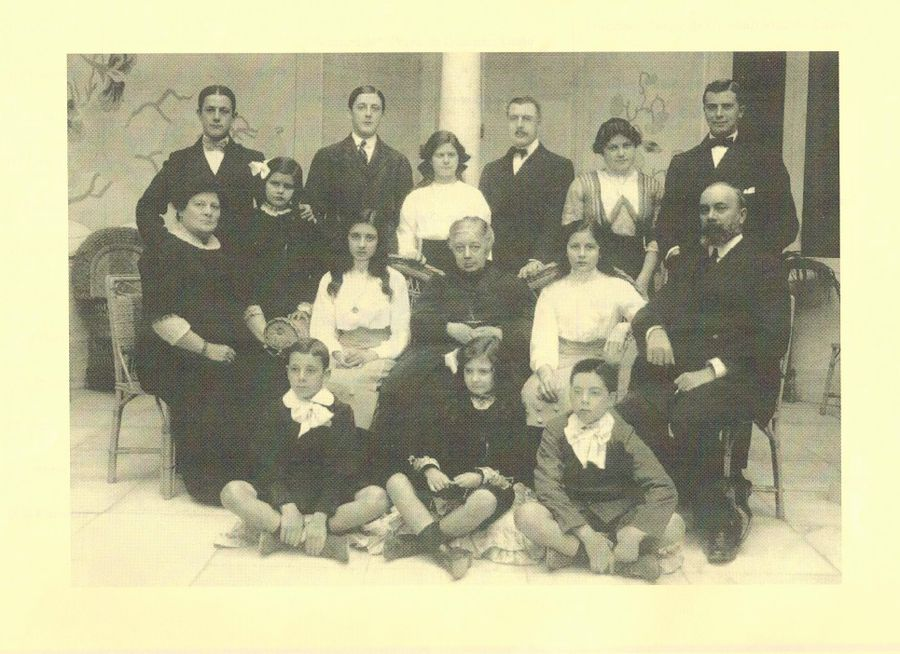
- Pedro Pérez de Guzmán (seated on floor, first from right), 1913

Mayor of Huelva
- In office 5 February 1949 – 21 August 1951
- Preceded by: Juan Rebollo Jiménez
- Succeeded by: Rafael Lozano Cuerda

Personal details
- Born: Pedro Pérez de Guzmán y Lasarte; 16 June 1901 Huelva, Andalusia, Spain
- Died: 21 June 1979 (aged 78) Sevilla, Andalusia, Spain
- Occupation: Naval officer; Sailor; Military commander; Footballer; Politician
Association football career
- Position: Forward
Youth career
- Recreativo de Huelva
Senior career*
Years	Team	Apps	(Gls)
1918–1919	Recreativo de Huelva		
1919	Madrid FC		
- * Club domestic league appearances and goals

Pedro Pérez de Guzmán y Lasarte (16 June 1901 – 21 June 1979) was a Spanish footballer, naval officer, and politician, who served as an Admiral of the Navy and as a mayor of Huelva. He was also a military commander during the Spanish Civil War, who fought on several Andalusian fronts. During his career, he was awarded with four individual Military Medals, a unique case in Spanish military and naval history.

== Early and personal life ==
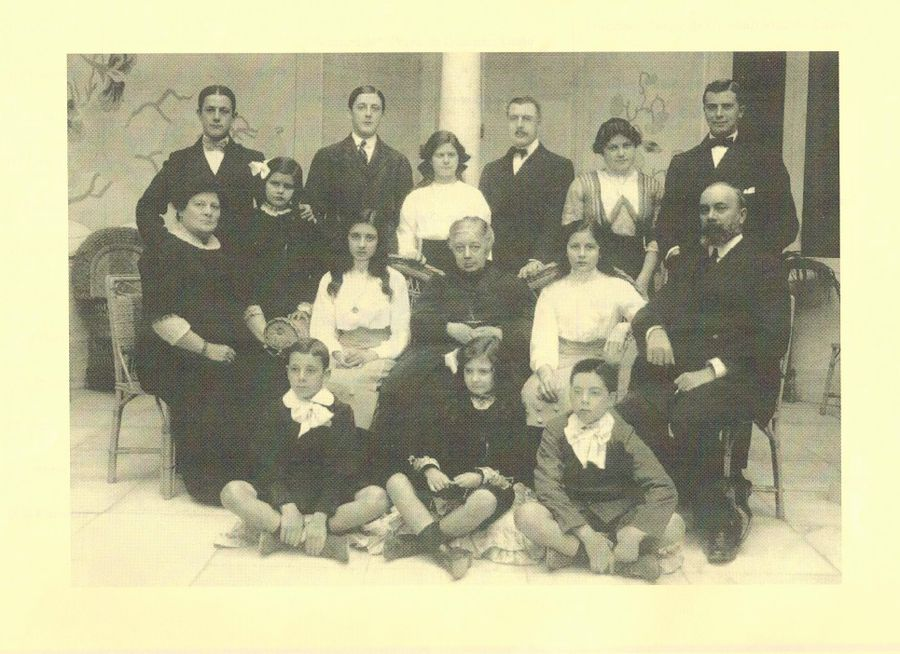
The 12-year-old Pedro (standing, first from right) with his family around 1913.

Manuel Pérez de Guzmán was born in the Extremaduran municipality of Jerez de los Caballeros on 9 August 1888, as the youngest son of Maria Teresa de Urzáiz, a native of Moguer, and Manuel Pérez de Guzmán, a landowner who served as the president of the Port of Huelva, the Chamber of Commerce, and the Real Sociedad Colombina.

On 20 August 1925, the 24-year-old Pérez de Guzmán married Carmen San Román Malarriga in Vigo, and the couple had three children, Pedro, Carmen, and Gonzalo.

== Sporting career ==
Like all his brothers, Pérez de Guzmán spent his youth in the sporting environment, instilled by his father, a sports lover; for instance, all of the six Pérez de Guzmán brothers played football at their hometown club, Recreativo de Huelva between 1903 and 1920. As the youngest son, Pedro only began playing in the club's first team in 1918, aged 17, and in the following year, in 1919, he briefly played for Madrid FC (currently known as Real Madrid), earning the nickname Guzmán el Bueno.

On 8 July 1919, Pérez de Guzmán, then a sailor on the ship Carlos V that was docked in the port of Vigo, was convinced by some Real Madrid fans to replace the injured Manuel Posada in the club's friendly match against Fortuna de Vigo, in which he played alongside the future Madrid president Santiago Bernabéu, and both of them scored once to help their side to a 3–2 win. This was Madrid's first-ever visit to Vigo, and five days later, on 13 July, he played his second and last match for Madrid, again against Fortuna, and again scoring once to help his side to a 2–1 win, thus scoring in the only two games he played for Madrid; few can say the same.

== Naval career ==
=== First steps and medals for bravery ===
After passing the exam, Pérez de Guzmán went on to the Naval Military School, then located in the town of San Carlos, entering as a candidate on 1 January 1916. In January 1918 he passed the exam to become a midshipman, earning his commission as an officer and his rank of frigate ensign in January 1920. He went on to embark on different units of the fleet, which at the time was reaching its peak during the Rif War, so the Navy remained constantly on alert in these waters.

After being promoted to naval ensign in January 1921, he was assigned to the gunboat Laya, from which he participated in the landing and operation on Sidi Dris beach on 1–2 June 1921. Despite being a non-commissioned officer, he reinforced the position with a detachment of only 15 sailors, which reached the coast and then managed to reach the front line at a critical moment, so that despite being few in number, some of the enemy forces were forced to bury their heads in the ground. Pérez de Guzmán then took command of four Spanish small-caliber cannons because their commanding officer had been wounded, and ordered to open fire without stopping and as quickly as possible. At first, he ordered the muzzles of the cannons to be lowered, as the enemy was no more than 25 meters away, but as they retreated, he ordered the muzzles to be raised again, hitting almost the entire enemy line squarely. "For this singular and meritorious act", he deserved his first individual Military Medal and the individual Naval Medal, being awarded to him by the King Alfonso XIII near the Torre del Oro in Seville on 30 July and 30 August, respectively. For the same reason, he was promoted to the rank of naval second lieutenant in the same year, for war merits.

On 25–26 July 1921, Pérez de Guzmán once again showed his bravery in the relief of the same position at Sidi Dris and Afrau, in which he was the last to leave, firing one of the machine guns, but despite his efforts, only 25 of the almost three hundred men reached Laya safely. For this decisive action, he deserved his second Naval Medal, but this was delayed for several months, being only awarded to him by the King on 25 April 1923, this time in Madrid.

=== Later years and retirement ===
From June 1922, Pérez de Guzmán was second in command of the coastguard Uad Lucus, took a course that same year in the Naval Aeronautics, and from March 1923, commander of the launch M-3, transferred to the gunboat Lauria in June 1923, and to the cruiser Reina Regente in February 1924. He was then promoted to lieutenant in June 1924 and, due to his poor health, was transferred to the Navy Command in Huelva, from which he moved to Ayamonte in 1925, returning to Huelva in February 1931. In September 1931 he was promoted to corvette captain and was appointed assistant to the Navy Command in Huelva, a position he held until November 1932, when the Government decided to discharge him from the Navy.

When the Second Spanish Republic was proclaimed and its Government began to restructure the Spanish Armed Forces in 1933, Pérez de Guzmán decided to be discharged from service, which was accepted without problems, so he retired to his hometown in the city of Huelva.

== Political career ==
Upon retiring in 1933, Pérez de Guzmán dedicated himself to defending his ideas, and two years later, in 1935, together with Pedro Bueno Bautista, the priest Luis Calderón Tejero, and José Espinosa de los Monteros, he founded the Brotherhood of the Virgin of Rocío de Bonaire, from here a pilgrimage was made several times a year.

At the same time, realizing that the only way to combat politicians and their excesses was to become a politician, Pérez de Guzmán joined the CEDA, and in the last general elections of the Second Spanish Republic, held between 16 and 23 February 1936, he came in the last elective position by being the sixth of the deputies corresponding to the city of Huelva, winning the seat with 66,618 votes.

== Military career ==
=== Spanish Civil War ===
During the apprehensive events that led to the Spanish Civil War, the Civil Governor of Huelva, as a preventive measure, ordered the arrest of all those he knew or thought could help the rebels, and among them was Pérez de Guzmán, who was taken to the prison ship Ramón. He was eventually released, however, and then joined the military uprising of 18 July 1936, and on that same day, he was named commander of the Huelva Navy, a position that he held until 5 October, when he took command of a Tercio de Requetés that bore his name ("Column of Pérez Guzmán"), as it was done with this type of military unit throughout the War. Once on their way, they attacked the town of Gibraleón, which was easily taken, moving on to Lepe, which was also taken by them due to the speed of their movement, followed by Cartaya, Ayamonte, and Isla Cristina, and when the entire region finally surrendered and sided with the rebels, the Tercios returned to Huelva to recover.

At some point during the War, Pérez de Guzmán became the commander of units of the Tercio of San Rafael de Córdoba and that of Nuestra Señora de la Merced, organized in Jerez de la Frontera, who upon reinforcement, took the city of Bujalance on 20 December 1936. A week later, on 27 December, these units attacked the city of Lopera, and at one point, they were almost surrounded by the enemy, but Guzmán realized this and ordered his forces to retreat to the Villa del Río road, and despite being momentarily heavily beaten by the enemy, nightfall arrived and his troops won the subsequent bayonet combat. Once this town was taken, they headed off to take Porcuna, but as the "Column of Pérez Guzmán" was no longer a military unit, having been half-destroyed and then reinforced in Lopera, it was instead deployed as a guerrilla force, who climbed the stone walls of Porcuna, which was on top of a promontory, and the distractions that they caused were successful in covering the unit's attacks, who thus took the city on 1 January 1937. For this and previous actions, the Tercio del Rocío was awarded the collective Military Medal, while his commander-in-chief, Pérez de Guzmán, was awarded the second Military Medal, although mainly because of his successful assistance provided to the Cadiz battalion, which was almost overwhelmed, preventing the enemy from gaining anything and thus increasing combat morale; this medal was awarded to him on 22 March 1939.

Pérez de Guzmán was then a commander of the Torpedo Boat Flotilla, based in Palma de Mallorca, with whom he mined the ports of Valencia and Castellón in two nights, and carried out a good campaign on the coast of Vinaroz, remaining there until September 1938, when he transferred as second in command to the auxiliary cruiser Mar Cantábrico, where he stayed until the end of the War, after which he was promoted to frigate captain and was then assigned to the General Staff of the Department of Cadiz, and in June 1940, to the Naval Command of the Algeciras Navy, where he remained for a short time for health reasons, leaving in January 1942, and thus returning to his previous retirement status.

=== Recognition ===
A few years later, his file fell into the hands of a Minister who, out of curiosity, reviewed it, realizing that he was the holder of two Naval Medals and two Military Medals, which "was something similar to being decorated with a Laureate"; in fact, being the holder of four individual Military Medals was a unique case in Spanish military and naval history. A dossier was thus prepared for the Generalísimo Francisco Franco with a series of promotions as a late reward for his great career, and in the end, the Caudillo signed a document that granted him four promotions upon reaching the statutory retirement age in 1972: to ship captain, rear admiral, vice admiral, and admiral.

== Later life ==
Pérez de Guzmán was mayor of Huelva from 5 February 1949 to 21 August 1951, replacing Juan Rebollo Jiménez and being replaced by Rafael Lozano Cuerda. It was under his mandate, in 1949, that Huelva saw the foundation of the Punta Umbría Maritime and Tennis Club, which once won the Copa del Rey de vela, with Pérez de Guzmán contributing to it as well, having donated the land in which the club's promenade was built.

Admiral Pérez de Guzmán was a very popular person in Huelva, particularly in Punta Umbría, where he spent long periods in his chalet, which consists of three floors spread over almost a thousand square meters, located behind the Club Marítimo. One of his great friends was Juan de Borbón, who at that time was exiled in Estoril, but taking advantage of Portugal's proximity to Punta Umbría, the Bourbon used to come by boat to Huelva and stay at the house of his friend Pérez de Guzmán.

== Death and legacy ==
Pérez de Guzmán died in Seville on 21 June 1979, at the age of 78.

A street in Punta Umbría was named after him.
