= José Guzmán (footballer) =

Spanish footballer (1891–1930)

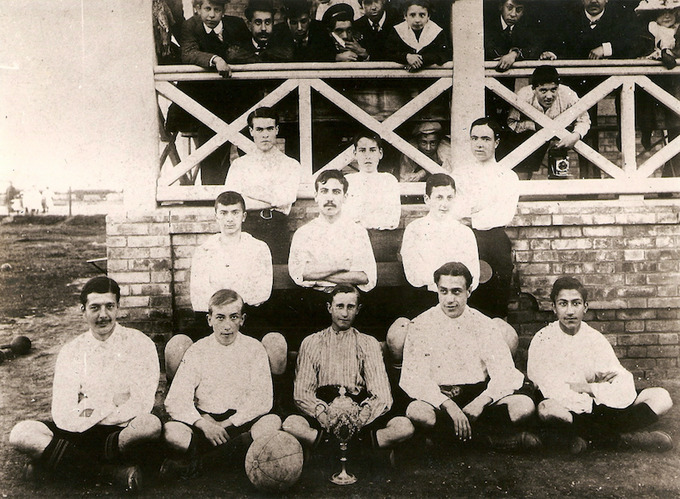
- Pérez de Guzmán (seated on chair, first from right) in 1906

Personal information
- Full name: José Pérez de Guzmán Urzaiz
- Date of birth: 1891
- Place of birth: Jerez de los Caballeros, Extremadura, Spain
- Date of death: 18 April 1930 (aged 38–39)
- Place of death: Huelva, Spain
- Position: Midfielder

Senior career*
Years	Team	Apps	(Gls)
1906–1915	Recreativo de Huelva		
1909–1910	→ Madrid FC (on loan)		
- * Club domestic league appearances and goals

José Pérez de Guzmán Urzaiz (1891 – 18 April 1930) was a Spanish footballer who played as a midfielder for Recreativo de Huelva and Madrid FC in the early 20th century. He is also known for being considered the creator of a new type of fandango whose purpose is not for dancing, as it is typically meant to, but rather for listening.

== Early and personal life ==
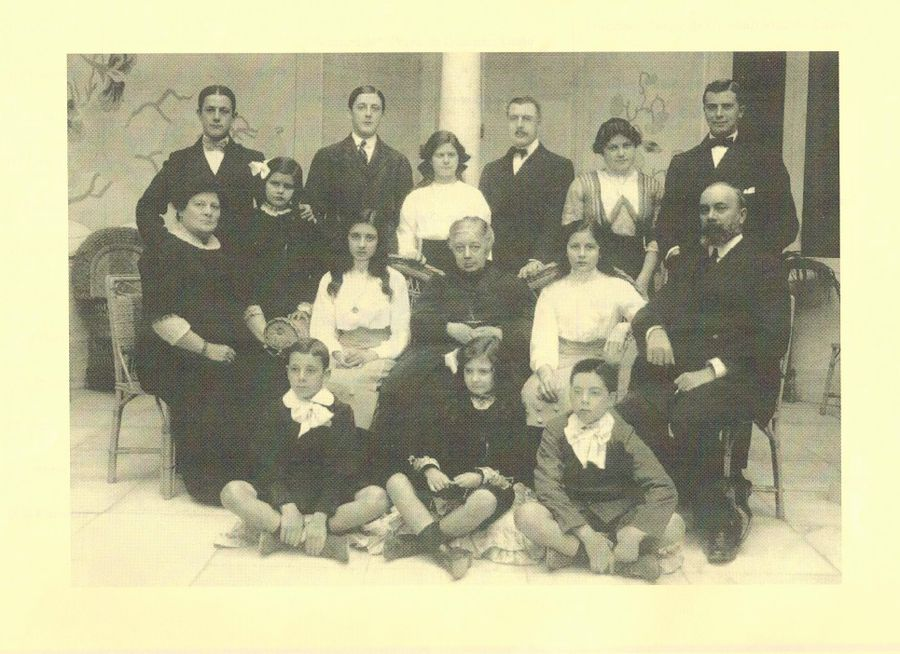
Pérez de Guzmán (standing, first from right) with his family around 1913.

José Pérez de Guzmán was born in the Extremaduran municipality of Jerez de los Caballeros in 1891, as the third son of Manuel Pérez de Guzmán, a landowner, and Maria Teresa de Urzáiz, a native of Moguer.

Pérez de Guzmán married Dolores Molina Alvarez, and the couple had no children.

== Playing career ==
Like all his brothers, Pérez de Guzmán spent his youth in the sporting environment, instilled by his father, a sports lover; for instance, all of the six Pérez de Guzmán brothers played football at their hometown club, Recreativo de Huelva between 1903 and 1920. When his father became the vice president of Recreativo de Huelva in 1906, he had four of his sons playing for the club, including José, aged 15.

In May 1909, three Recreativo players, José, his older brother Francisco, and Antonio Tellechea, traveled from Huelva to Extremadura, at the request of the recently created CD Badajoz, to reinforce the club in its first-ever match. A few months later, Madrid FC made the same request, taking advantage of the fact that three of the Pérez de Guzmán brothers (Francisco, José, and Luis) were studying for their university degrees in the Spanish capital, and thus, all of them ended up playing on loan in the ranks of the Madrid FC.

During the 1909–10 season, his brothers Francisco and Luis played several matches for Madrid, official or otherwise, but during the build-up for the 1910 Copa del Rey (UECF), Madrid, which already had three players from Recreativo, the other being Tomás Estrada, requested the incorporation of another one, José, but despite their presence, Madrid failed to reach the final. These were the only two official matches that José played for Madrid.

On 31 March 1910, José and his older brother Manuel started for Recreativo in the Seville City Council Cup, helping his side to a 2–0 win over Seville FC at the Plaza de España field. During the first half of the 1910s, he helped Recreativo win three unofficial Andalusian Championship, which Recreativo itself organized, and the Copa Centenario de las Cortes de Cádiz in 1912. Outside football, he also enjoyed horses and bullfighting, and at one point, he even wanted to be a bullfighter.

== Fandango ==
Outside his sporting career, Pérez de Guzmán was known as an amateur flamenco singer and guitarist.

He is associated with a personal style of fandango, often referred to as the fandango de Pérez de Guzmán, which differs from dance-oriented fandangos in that it is primarily intended for listening.

This style has been performed by later flamenco singers and has been discussed in flamenco-related sources.

According to flamenco researcher Juan Gómez Hiraldo, Pérez de Guzmán incorporated melodic elements from other singers into his style, contributing to the development and distinctiveness of his fandango.

Although he did not make commercial recordings, his reputation as a singer and flamenco aficionado has been documented through later testimonies and studies.

The monograph titled Don José Pérez de Guzmán y su fandango, written by flamenco scholar Francisco Zambrano Vázquez and published by the Provincial Council of Badajoz in 2008, provides a detailed study of his life and his role in the development of this fandango style.

== Death ==
In 1927, Guzmán contracted the then-incurable disease of tuberculosis, which had already claimed the lives of his brother Joaquín in 1927, when he was only 27 years old.

Due to this illness, he fell into a deep depression and despair and eventually took his own life with a firearm, dying at the Convento de la Luz in the town of Lucena del Puerto on 18 April 1930, at the age of 39.

== Legacy ==
Almost half a century after his death, Pepe Marchena gave an illustrated lecture at the University of Seville in 1972, in which he recalled and mentioned a decisive protagonist of the glorious expansion of the fandango, José Guzmán.

== Honours ==
Recreativo de Huelva

- Andalusian Championship:
  - Champions (3): 1910, 1911, and 1912
- Copa Centenario de las Cortes de Cádiz
  - Champions (1): 1912

== See also ==
- List of Real Madrid CF players
