= Jerez de los Caballeros =

- Town
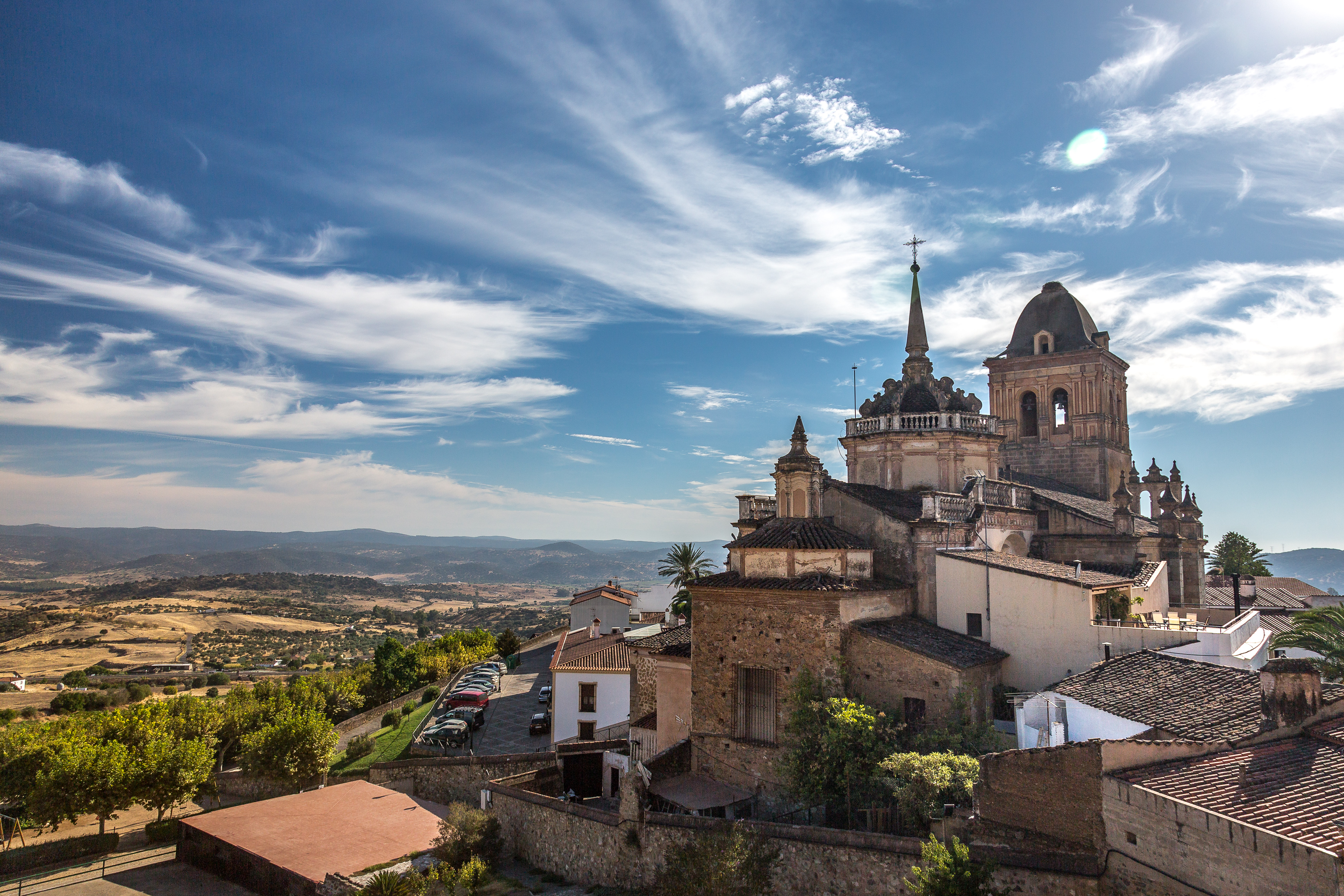
- Jerez de los Caballeros

- Coat of arms

- Location in Extremadura Jerez de los Caballeros (Spain)
- Coordinates: 38°19′13″N 6°46′17″W
- Country: Spain
- Autonomous Community: Extremadura
- Province: Badajoz
- Comarca: Sierra Suroeste

Government
  - Mayor: Virginia Borrallo Rubio (PSOE)

Area
  - Total: 740 km^{2} (290 sq mi)
- Elevation (AMSL): 506 m (1,660 ft)

Population (2025-01-01)
  - Total: 9,095
  - Density: 12/km^{2} (32/sq mi)
- Time zone: UTC+1 (CET)
  - Summer (DST): UTC+2 (CEST (GMT +2))
- Postal code: 06380
- Area code: +34 (Spain) + 924 (Badajoz)
- Website: www.jerezcaballeros.es

Jerez de los Caballeros (Spanish: [xeˈɾeθ ðe los kaβaˈʎeɾos]) is a town of south-western Spain, in the province of Badajoz. It is located on two hills overlooking the River Ardila, a tributary of the Guadiana, 18 km east of the Portuguese border. The old town is surrounded by a Moorish wall with six gates. The town is said to have been founded by Alfonso IX of Leon in 1229; in 1232 it was extended by his son Ferdinand III the Saint, who gave it to the Knights Templar. Hence the name Jerez de los Caballeros, Jerez of the Knights.

Jerez de los Caballeros is the birthplace of the explorers Hernando de Soto and Vasco Núñez de Balboa. On 10 May 1539, Hernando de Soto wrote in his will: "That a chapel be erected within the Church of San Miguel in Jerez de los Cabelleros, Spain, where De Soto grew up, at a cost of 2,000 ducats, with an altarpiece featuring the Virgin Mary, Our Lady of the Conception, that his tomb be covered in a fine black broadcloth topped by a red cross of the Order of the Knights of Santiago, and on special occasions a pall of black velvet with the De Soto coat of arms be placed on the altar; that a chaplain be hired at the salary of 12,000 maravedis to perform five masses every week for the souls of De Soto, his parents and wife; that thirty masses be said for him the day his body was interred, and twenty for our Lady of the Conception, ten for the Holy Ghost, sixty for souls in purgatory and masses for many others as well; that 150000 maravedis be given annually to his wife Isabel for her needs and an equal amount used yearly to marry off three orphan damsels...the poorest that can be found," who would then assist his wife and also serve to burnish the memory of De Soto as a man of charity and substance. However, De Soto ended up dead in the house of an Indian chief at the headwaters of the Arkansas River near present-day McArthur, Arkansas, and died an impoverished defeated man, with "four Indian slaves, three horses and 700 hogs".

== Notable people ==
- Arantxa Castilla-La Mancha – drag queen
- Milagros Frías – writer and journalist
- Francisco Guzmán – footballer
- José Guzmán – footballer
- Vasco Núñez de Balboa – explorer, governor and conquistador
- Paco Peña – footballer
- Juan Pérez de Guzmán y Boza – bibliophile, politician and historian
- Manuel Pérez de Guzmán – footballer
- Manuel Pérez de Guzmán – landowner
- Pedro Pérez de Guzmán – footballer, naval officer and politician
- Hernando de Soto – explorer and conquistador

== See also ==
- List of municipalities in Badajoz
