= Francisco Antúnez =

Spanish footballer

Personal information
- Full name: Francisco Antúnez Espada
- Date of birth: 1 November 1922
- Place of birth: Seville, Spain
- Date of death: 16 August 1994 (aged 71)
- Place of death: Seville, Spain
- Position: Defender

Youth career
- Betis
- Sevilla

Senior career*
Years	Team	Apps	(Gls)
1941–1945	Betis		
1945–1952	Sevilla	117	(0)
1952–1954	Málaga	7	(0)
1954–1955	Xerez	5	(0)

International career
1949–1951	Spain	4	(0)

Managerial career
- 1960–1963: Recreativo
- 1963–1964: Algeciras
- 1964–1965: Granada
- 1965–1966: Oviedo
- 1967–1968: Recreativo
- 1968–1970: Sevilla B
- 1970–1971: Recreativo
- * Club domestic league appearances and goals

Francisco Antúnez Espada (1 November 1922 – 16 August 1994) was a footballer. He took part in the 1950 FIFA World Cup. He won the Spanish League in 1946 with Sevilla FC, the only one in its history.
