= Tomás Estrada (footballer) =

Spanish footballer (1888–??)

Personal information
- Full name: Tomás Estrada del Río
- Date of birth: 1888
- Place of birth: Huelva, Spain
- Date of death: Unknown
- Place of death: Unknown
- Position: Midfielder

Senior career*
Years	Team	Apps	(Gls)
1905–1915	Recreativo de Huelva		
1909–1910	→ Madrid FC (on loan)		
- * Club domestic league appearances and goals

Tomás Estrada del Río (1888 – unknown) was a Spanish footballer who played as a midfielder for Recreativo de Huelva and Madrid FC in the early 20th century. He was also a cartoonist, scriptwriter, painter, graphic humorist in the local press.

== Early life ==
Tomás Estrada was born in Huelva in 1888, (Note: Some sources wrongly state that he was born in 1889.) as the son of Tomás Estrada Mojarro (1865–?) and Marina Del Río Collado (1865–?). He was the eldest of three siblings, Cinta (1892–?) and Cristobal (1899–?).

== Sporting career ==
Estrada began his football career with his hometown club Recreativo de Huelva, going through the different ranks of the club until reaching the first team in 1905, aged 16. Together with William Waterson, Antonio Tellechea, Ángel Padilla, and Manuel Pérez de Guzmán, he was a member of the Huelva squad that participated in the 1906 Copa del Rey, which was contested by only three teams, the other two being Athletic Bilbao and Madrid FC (currently known as Real Madrid), with the latter winning it.

On 7 February 1909, the local press reported on Club Español de Madrid's invitation to Estrada from Huelva to play some matches with them, taking advantage of the fact that he was studying to be a draughtsman in the Spanish capital. Madrid FC was quick to notice this too, and made the same invitation, and thus, Estrada played on loan for Madrid FC, starting in a total of four matches during the 1909–10 season, two in the first edition of the friendly tournament Copa Rodríguez Arzuaga (won by Gimnástica), and the other two in the 1910 Copa del Rey (UECF). On the latter occasion, Madrid played with four players from Huelva, the other three being the Pérez de Guzmán brothers (Paco, Luís, José).

During the first half of the 1910s, Estrada helped Recreativo win three unofficial Andalusian Championship, which Recreativo itself organized, and the Copa Centenario de las Cortes de Cádiz in 1912. At one point, Estrada was everything at Recreativo: player, captain, referee, and manager, and also correspondent in Huelva for the weekly Madrid Sport. In 1919 he even created the magazine Huelva Sport to report weekly on sporting events in the city of Huelva. He was also a cartoonist, scriptwriter, painter, graphic humorist in the local press.

Some sources state that in addition to Madrid and Huelva, Estrada also played for Sevilla. In the general guide of "Huelva and its Province" of 1917, Estrada is listed as an employee residing in Rascón.

== Personal life and death ==
He is the father of Tomás Estrada, a teacher and cartoonist who was the creator of El Abuelo, a character who reviewed the football matches in some Huelva newspapers, and who remains in the collective memory of Huelva as the mascot of Recreativo de Huelva.

== Honours ==
Recreativo de Huelva

- Andalusian Championship:
  - Champions (3): 1910, 1911, and 1912

Copa Centenario de las Cortes de Cádiz

  - Champions (1): 1912

== See also ==
- List of Real Madrid CF players
