= Manuel Pérez de Guzmán (landowner) =

Spanish landowner and sportsperson

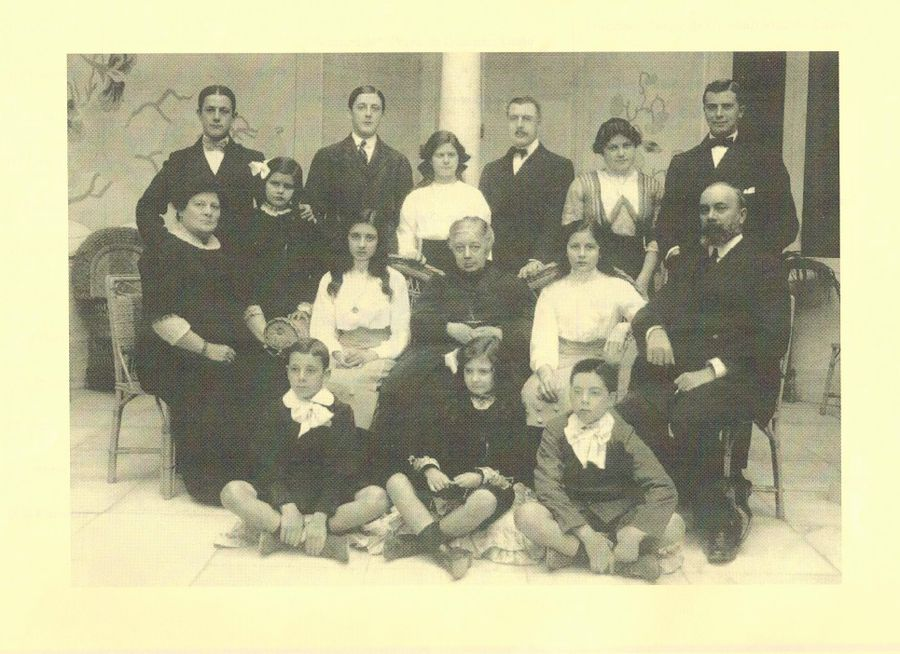
- Pérez de Guzmán (seated on chair, first from right) with his family around 1910
- Born: Manuel Valentín Pérez de Guzmán y Lasarte; 14 February 1863; Jerez de los Caballeros, Extremadura, Spain
- Died: 8 January 1920 (aged 56); Huelva, Spain
- Resting place: Catholic Cemetery of San Sebastián in Huelva
- Citizenship: Spanish
- Occupations: Landowner; Sportsperson; Politician
- Known for: Vice president of Recreativo de Huelva
- Political party: Conservative Party
- Father: Manuel, Francisco, José, Luis, and Pedro

President of the Port of Huelva

Vice president of Recreativo de Huelva
- In office 1906–1920
- Preceded by: José Muñoz Pérez

Manuel Valentín Pérez de Guzmán y Lasarte (14 February 1863 – 8 January 1920) was a Spanish landowner who served as the president of the Port of Huelva, the Chamber of Commerce, and the Real Sociedad Colombina.

He is best known for his stint as vice president of Recreativo de Huelva during the presidency of William Alexander Mackay. All of his sons were footballers of some sort and most of them were notable and successful in some way, from club presidents and mayors to creators of fandango.

== Early and personal life ==
Manuel Pérez de Guzmán was born in the Extremaduran municipality of Jerez de los Caballeros on 14 February 1863, as the fifth child of Francisco de Paula de Guzmán y Sotomayor (1833–1864), and María del Pilar Lasarte y Andrés de la Cámara. He was baptized in the church of San Bartolomé.

On 8 June 1887, the 24-year-old Pérez de Guzmán married in Seville to Maria Teresa de Urzáiz y Cavero, a native of Moguer, although her father came from Santiago, Dominican Republic. The couple had twelve children: Four consecutive sons followed by four consecutive daughters, and then two more sons followed by two more daughters. They were Manuel, Francisco, José, Luis, María Teresa (1894–1980), Josefa, Luz, Maria del Pilar (1898–1986), Joaquin (1899–1926), Pedro, Maria Concepción (1903–1994), and María del Carmen (1904–1958).

== Professional career ==
In addition to being a solid merchant and industrialist, Pérez de Guzmán enjoyed a wide social recognition in Huelva that led him to the presidency of the Port of Huelva, president of the Chamber of Commerce, and president of the Real Sociedad Colombina. In February 1891, he had to sell the property La Cardeñosa in Badajoz to Manuela Basilia Liaño (1850–1909) after the latter submitted to the opinion of three friendly mediators to resolve the conflict of possession that began during the lifetime of her late husband Cecilio de Lora y Castro. He also dedicated himself to politics, becoming a member of the Conservative Party and a deputy for Ayamonte, although in 1900 he confessed himself retired and disillusioned with politics, so he dedicated to the aggrandizement of his estate. Three years later, in 1903, Pérez de Guzmán opened the La Luz Flour Factory at Molino de la Vega, which had been "built with all the modern advances".

Three years later, in October 1906, a certain Ernesto Riehl Knoll requested from the civil Government the permission to expand Pérez de Guzmán's dock, which was adjacent to the pier of the Vega mill, as well as two pieces of marsh destined for a reservoir of storing wood of great square and length, but such petition was ruled out until Riehl could prove that the dock's owner had agreed with his project. As a result of this ruling, Pérez Guzmán initiated the file for legalization of that dock, whose concession had been granted to him on 3 October 1905, in which it is stated that he would renounce all kinds of claims for the hindrance that Riehl could cause him with his works in the dock. However, two complaints were filed against Riehl's petition, one of which from a certain Gustavo Brandet, owner of the old La Vega mill, since the extension of the dock would infringe Brandet's rights. This situation was only resolved with the intervention of His Majesty the King, who saw fit to order that the requested concession be granted, with some conditions.

In the general guide of "Huelva and its Province" of 1917, Pérez de Guzmán is listed as a propietario (landowner) residing in Santa Fé (Huelva). His name is mentioned several times throughout the guide, being listed as the owner of the La Luz Flour Factory at Molino de la Vega, as one of three administrators at the Bank of Spain, as a deputy for Ayamonte, as a member of the "Board of Works and Technical Management of the [Huelva] Port", as the vice-president of Recreativo, and as a member of the "Shipwrecked Rescue Society".

== Sporting activity ==
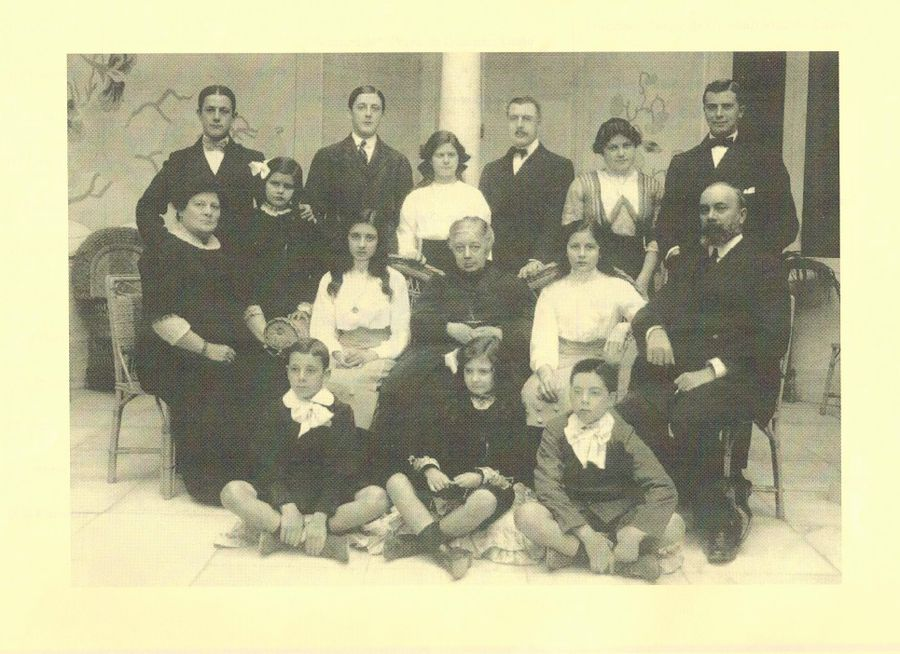
Pérez de Guzmán (seated on chair, first from right) with his family around 1910.

As a sports lover, Pérez de Guzmán transmitted that passion to all of his sons, most of whom spent their youth in the sporting environment; for instance, all of his six sons played football at their hometown club, Recreativo de Huelva between 1903 and 1920. When Pérez de Guzmán became the vice president of Recreativo de Huelva in 1906, he had four of his sons playing for the club. A few months later, Huelva won the Copa Muñoz against a team made up of English sailors, so he took a picture with his six sons, including the 6-year-old Pedro, all wearing the club's colours.

Three of the Pérez de Guzmán brothers (Francisco, Luis, and José), who were studying for their university degrees in Madrid at the time, also played on loan in the ranks of the Madrid teams between 1909 and 1913, first for Madrid FC and later for Sociedad Gimnástica, and Luis even started for the latter in the 1912 Copa del Rey final, which ended in a 2–0 loss to FC Barcelona. His youngest son, Pedro, also played for Madrid in 1919, earning the nickname Guzmán el Bueno.

Sometimes, Pérez de Guzmán is wrongly listed as the club's president from 1907 to 1918, but the only Pérez de Guzmán who presided RC Huelva was his eldest son Manuel, from 1935 to 1939, thus becoming only the second former Huelva player to become the club's president.

== Death ==
Pérez de Guzmán died in Huelva on 8 January 1920, at the age of 56, and on the morning of the following day, his body was taken from the mortuary house, at Paseo de Santa Fé, to the Catholic Cemetery of San Sebastián in Huelva. Following his death, the press stated that "Mr. Perez de Guzmán, for his high gifts of kindness and intelligence, enjoyed the appreciation of everyone in Huelva".

== Legacy ==
His second son Francisco was president of the Provincial Council of Huelva, and his third son José was a good singer, and is currently considered the creator of a new type of fandango whose purpose is not for dancing, as it is typically meant to, but rather for listening. His youngest son Pedro became a naval officer, an honorary admiral of the Navy, and an illustrious sailor, who founded the Punta Umbría Maritime Club in 1949, which once won the Copa del Rey de vela. He was also a mayor of the city of Huelva. His youngest daughter, Maria del Carmen, married José de Toro Buiza, Count of Valdeinfantas and captain of artillery.

In 2017, one of his descendants, Gonzalo Pérez de Guzmán, donated a photo from 1906 to Recreativo de Huelva, in which Manuel, then vice-president of the club, can be seen with his six sons.
