= Juan Pérez de Guzmán y Boza =

Spanish historian, bibliophile, and politician

The Duke of T'Serclaes
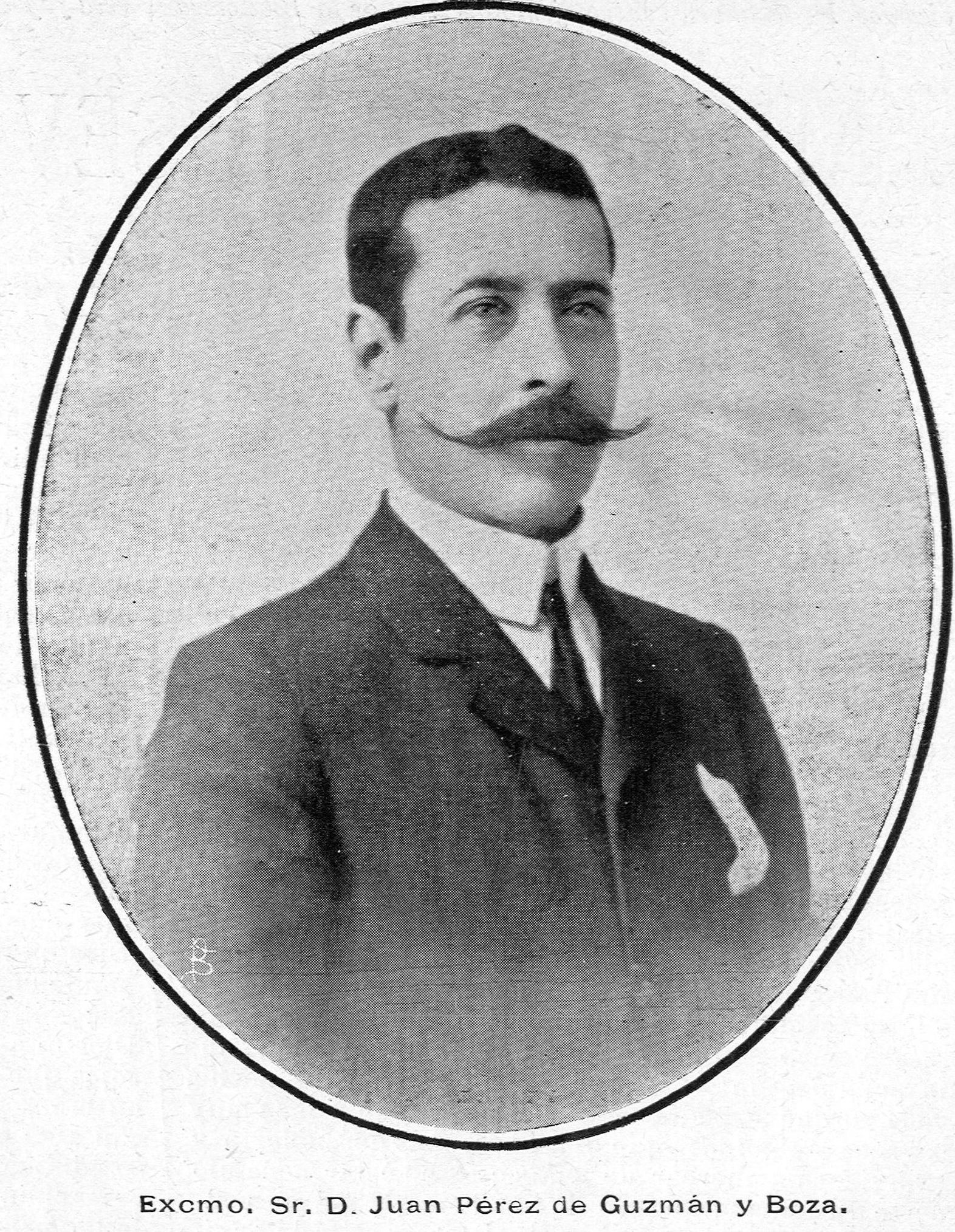
- Pérez de Guzmán in 1913
- Born: Juan Francisco Pérez de Guzmán y Boza; 7 April 1852; Jerez de los Caballeros, Extremadura, Spain
- Died: 12 February 1934 (aged 81); San Sebastián, Spain
- Citizenship: Spanish
- Occupations: Bibliophile; Politician; Historian
- Known for: Member of the Royal Academy of History
- Political party: Conservative Party

Juan Francisco Pérez de Guzmán y Boza, 2nd Duke of T'Serclaes, GE (7 April 1852 – 12 February 1934) was a Spanish bibliophile, politician, historian, and member of the Royal Academy of History.

He was the second Duke of T'Serclaes between 1879 and 1934. He had a twin brother, Manuel Pérez de Guzmán y Boza, Jerez de los Caballeros, and they owned very rich libraries and held gatherings that led to the consolidation of the Andalusian Bibliophile Society.

== Early and personal life ==
Pérez de Guzmán was born in the Extremaduran municipality of Jerez de los Caballeros on 7 April 1852, as the son of Manuel Pérez de Guzmán y Liaño (1798–1878), first Duke of T'Serclaes, and thus, upon his death in 1878, Juan Francisco became the second Duke of T'Serclaes, a position that he held for more than half a century until he died in 1934.

He graduated in law from the University of Seville, the city where he lived, and on 21 March 1882, married María de los Dolores Sanjuán y Garvey, with whom he had ten children.

== Career as a historian and bibliophile ==
Pérez de Guzmán never practiced Law since his passion was always bibliophilia and bibliography. From a young age, Juan and his twin brother Manuel acquired books with which they completed an extraordinary library, so both promoted Sevillian literature and became great amateur historians and bibliophiles. Although at first the interests of both were oriented towards Andalusian and even more towards Sevillian, little by little the field was divided, with his brother Manuel standing out as an editor of rare and difficult-to-find works, specializing in literature and poetry, while Juan focused on historical subjects, especially through the collection of newspapers since he was aware of the enormous documentary value of the press for the reconstruction of local history in all its aspects.

The twin brothers owned very rich libraries and held gatherings that led to the consolidation of the Andalusian Bibliophile Society. In the 1880s, he founded an important scholarly gathering in Seville that was held daily in the library of his own palace, in which the importance and merit of books were judged, obscure points of history were discussed, interesting documents recently found or very rare works recently acquired were presented or reported, and the publication of others was planned. These gatherings were attended, in addition to his own brother Manuel, by Manuel Gómez Imaz, Luis Montoto, José Gestoso y Pérez, Francisco Rodríguez Marín, the printer Enrique Rasco and, occasionally, when he passed through Seville, Marcelino Menéndez Pelayo, among others.

In 1886–87, Pérez de Guzmán financed and directed the bi-monthly magazine Archivo Hispalense and participated in the foundation of the Andalusian Bibliophile Society, which published outstanding works. In 1891, he moved to Madrid, along with his library, where he continued buying books and loose pamphlets, and kindly inviting researchers who wanted to consult his books.

A bibliophile, collector, and historian interested in Andalusian history and literature, especially that of Seville, he belonged to that group of aristocratic historians of the late 19th and early 20th centuries. He maintained a close friendship with the Marquis of Villaurrutia and the Duke of Maura, with whom he shared an eminently erudite and political-literary vision of history.

In 1902, the Hispanist Archer Milton Huntington wanted to buy the libraries of the Pérez de Guzmán brothers, but he only obtained Manuel's, which is preserved in the Hispanic Society of America; Juan's library was gradually dispersed in auctions and Madrid bookstores, although some of his books, loose sheets, and manuscripts were deposited in the Spanish National Library. Part of his collection, specifically his collection of literary, cultural, political, and economic magazines from the 18th, 19th, and part of the 20th century, were acquired by the University of Connecticut (United States) in the 1970s. The narration of the journeys of these copies to their current storage and the cataloging of the Sevillian titles, among which there are several unpublished titles, constitute central objectives of the volume.

== Academic career ==
Following the death of Antonio Aguilar y Correa in 1908, Pérez de Guzmán, who had been a corresponding member of the Royal Academy of History since 11 November 1887, was proposed to become a member of RAH by Jerónimo López de Ayala, Vicente Vignau y Ballester, Francisco Uhagón y Guardamino, Ricardo Beltrán y Rózpide, and Francisco Fernández de Bethencourt, being elected as such on the meeting of 23 October 1908. He joined the corporation on 25 April 1909 with his speech History and historians of the ancient Kingdom of Seville, which was answered by Fernández de Bethencourt. Pérez de Guzmán was also an academic of the Royal Seville Academy of Fine Letters, which he joined on 26 April 1892 with a speech entitled "The Ancient Origin of the City of Seville, its Foundation by Hercules of Thebes, and Possession of Kings Who Inhabited It until the Moors".

== Political career ==
A wealthy rentier with a conservative liberal ideology, Pérez de Guzmán was a member of the Conservative Party led by Antonio Cánovas del Castillo and was a senator for the province of Badajoz in his own right (1891–1893 and 1900–1901).

== Noble status ==
Grandee of Spain since 1881, Pérez de Guzmán was a knight of the Order of Alcántara (1898), knight of the Order of Saint John of Malta, lieutenant of the Senior Brother of the Real Maestranza de Caballería de Sevilla, gentleman of the Chamber, Order of Charles III, and president of the Royal Society for the Rescue of Shipwrecked People.

== Death ==
Pérez de Guzmán died in San Sebastián on 12 February 1934, at the age of 81.
