= 1909–10 Madrid FC season =

8th season in existence of Real Madrid CF

Madrid FC
1909–10 season
- President: Adolfo Meléndez
- Manager: Arthur Johnson
- Stadium: No home stadium
- Madrid Regional Championship (Note: The Campeonato Regional de Madrid (Madrid Regional Championship) was a regional league used as a qualifier for the Copa del Rey.): 3rd
- Copa del Rey: 3rd
- Biggest win: Madrid FC 4–0 Español de Madrid
- Biggest defeat: Español de Madrid 4–0 Madrid FC
Home colours	Away colours

The 1909–10 season was Madrid Football Club's 8th season in existence. The club played some friendly matches against local clubs. They also played in the Campeonato Regional de Madrid (Madrid Regional Championship) and the Copa del Rey.

Arthur Johnson was appointed as manager of Madrid FC in 1910 becoming the first manager in the club's history.

== Players ==
Note: Flags indicate national team as defined under FIFA eligibility rules; some limited exceptions apply. Players may hold more than one non-FIFA nationality.

No.	Pos.	Nation	Player
—	GK	ESP	Joaquín Redondo Pérez
—	DF	ESP	José Carruana Vázquez
—	DF	ESP	Francisco Guzmán
—	DF	ESP	Manuel Losada
—	MF	ESP	Tomás Estrada del Río

No.	Pos.	Nation	Player
—	MF	ESP	José Guzmán
—	MF	ESP	Guillermo Linney
—	MF	ESP	Enrique Normand
—	FW	ESP	Julio Chulilla Gazol
—	FW	ESP	Arturo López Espinosa
—	FW	ESP	Luis Guzmán

== Friendlies ==
10 October 1909 Friendly	Madrid FC	4–1	Gimnástica	Av. Plaza de Toros, Madrid
	? ? ? ?	Report	Rodríguez-Eguinoa	Referee: Charpentier

17 October 1909 Friendly	Madrid FC	0–5	Gimnástica	Av. Plaza de Toros, Madrid
		Report

24 October 1909 Friendly	Madrid FC	2–1	Athletic Madrid	Av. Plaza de Toros, Madrid
		Report		Referee: Méndez

24 October 1909 Friendly	Madrid FC	8–0	Academia Infanteria	Av. Plaza de Toros, Madrid
		Report

7 November 1909 Friendly	Madrid FC	0–3	Gimnástica	Av. Plaza de Toros, Madrid
		Report		Referee: Carrasco

14 November 1909 Friendly	Madrid FC	2–1	Athletic Madrid	Madrid
	L. Guzman; Saura	Report	Allende	Referee: M. Yarza

21 November 1909 Friendly	Madrid FC	0–3	Español de Madrid	Madrid
		Report	A. Giralt	Referee: Allende
Note: At the request of Madrid FC, the match was played for the first time with guards to control the public.

6 January 1910 Friendly	Madrid FC	0–1	RS Gimnástica	Av. Plaza de Toros, Madrid
		Report	Colleda
Note: The match was played by the second teams of both clubs.

=== Copa Rodriguez Arzuaga ===
23 January 1910 Copa Rodriguez Arzuaga	Madrid FC	0–3	Español de Madrid	Av. Plaza de Toros, Madrid
		Report	Neyra; V. Älvarez Buylla

30 January 1910 Copa Rodriguez Arzuaga	Madrid FC	0–0	RS Gimnástica	Retiro, Madrid
Morning		Report		Referee: P. Buylla

30 January 1910 Copa Rodriguez Arzuaga	Madrid FC	4–1	Español de Madrid	Av. Plaza de Toros, Madrid
	Guzmán; Lacaustra	Report	?
Note: Madrid played the match with ten players as Chulilla could not appear.

2 February 1910 Copa Rodriguez Arzuaga	Madrid FC	3–1	Athletic Madrid	Av. Plaza de Toros, Madrid
		Report

6 February 1910 Copa Rodriguez Arzuaga	Madrid FC	1–3	RS Gimnástica	Retiro, Madrid
		Report

13 February 1910 Copa Rodriguez Arzuaga	Athletic Madrid	2–0	Madrid FC	Retiro, Madrid
		Report
Note: The match was played by the second teams of both clubs.

27 February 1910 Final	Madrid FC	1–2	RS Gimnástica	Av. Plaza de Toros, Madrid
		Report

== Competitions ==
=== Overview ===
Competition	First match	Last match	Starting round	Final position	Record							
Competition	First match	Last match	Starting round	Final position	Pld	W	D	L	GF	GA	GD	Win %
Campeonato Regional de Madrid	28 November 1909	8 December 1909	Matchday 1	Third place	4	1	1	2	6	7	−1	25.00
Copa del Rey	19 March 1910	21 March 1910	First round	Third place	2	0	0	2	0	4	−4	0.00
Total					6	1	1	4	6	11	−5	16.67

Source: Competitions

=== Campeonato Regional de Madrid ===
==== League table ====
Pos	Team	Pld	W	D	L	GF	GA	GD	Pts
1	RS Gimnástica (C)	4	2	2	0	7	6	+1	6
2	Español Madrid	4	1	1	2	6	6	0	3
3	Madrid	4	1	1	2	6	7	−1	3

Source: Rec.Sport.Soccer Statistics Foundation
Rules for classification: 1) points; 2) goal difference; 3) number of goals scored.
(C) Champions

==== Matches ====
28 November 1909 1	Madrid FC	0–4	Español de Madrid	Av. Plaza de Toros, Madrid
		Report	? A. Giralt ? ?	Referee: Kindelán

5 December 1909 2	Madrid FC	1–1	RS Gimnástica	Av. Plaza de Toros, Madrid
		Report		Referee: M. Yarza

8 December 1909 3	Español de Madrid	0–4	Madrid FC	Av. Plaza de Toros, Madrid
Morning		Report
Note: The match was played by the second teams of both clubs.

8 December 1909 4	Madrid FC	1–2	RS Gimnástica	Av. Plaza de Toros, Madrid
	Saura	Report	Carruana; Kindelán	Referee: P. Buylla

=== Copa del Rey ===
19 March 1910 1	Athletic Bilbao	2–0	Madrid FC	Ondarreta Stadium, San Sebastián
	Remigio Iza; Martyn Veitch	Report		Referee: (France) Lavat

21 March 1910 2	Vasconia FC	2–0	Madrid FC	Ondarreta Stadium, San Sebastián
	McGuinness	Report		Referee: (France) Lavat
