= Manuel Pérez de Guzmán (footballer) =

Spanish footballer and sports manager

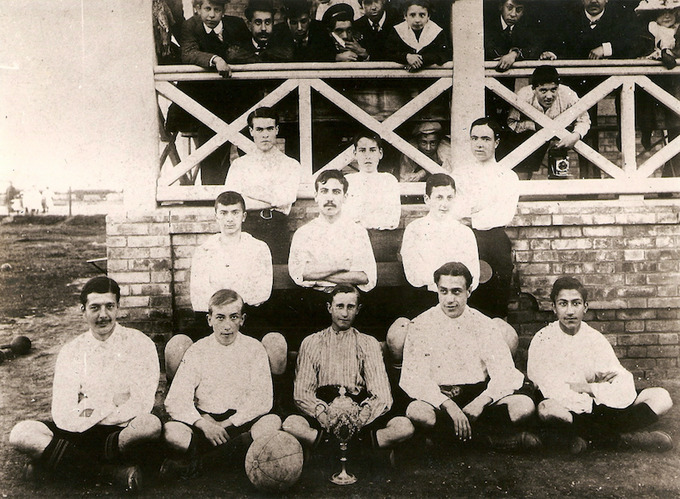
- Pérez de Guzmán (seated on floor, first from left) in 1906

Personal information
- Full name: Manuel Pérez de Guzmán Urzaiz
- Date of birth: 9 August 1888
- Place of birth: Jerez de los Caballeros, Extremadura, Spain
- Date of death: 22 January 1957 (aged 68)
- Place of death: Huelva, Andalusia, Spain
- Position: Midfielder

Youth career
- Recreativo de Huelva

Senior career*
Years	Team	Apps	(Gls)
1905–1907	Recreativo de Huelva		
1910–1914	Recreativo de Huelva		
President of Recreativo de Huelva
In office 1935–1939
Preceded by	Arturo López-Damas
Succeeded by	Arturo López-Damas
- * Club domestic league appearances and goals

Manuel Pérez de Guzmán Urzaiz (9 August 1888 – 22 January 1957) was a Spanish footballer who played as a midfielder for Recreativo de Huelva between 1905 and 1907, and again between 1910 and 1914.

He later served as the president of Recreativo de Huelva from 1935 to 1939, thus becoming only the second former Huelva player to become the club's president.

== Early and personal life ==
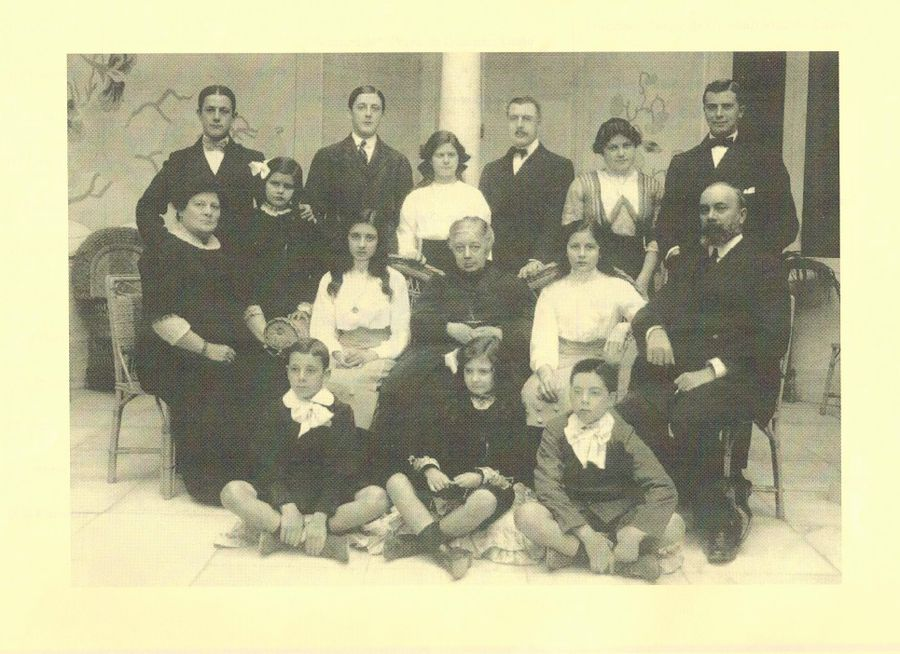
Pérez de Guzmán (standing, third from right) with his family around 1913.

Manuel Pérez de Guzmán was born in the Extremaduran municipality of Jerez de los Caballeros on 9 August 1888, as the first son of Manuel Pérez de Guzmán, a landowner, and Maria Teresa de Urzáiz, a native of Moguer.

On 16 July 1913, Pérez de Guzmán married in the Church of San Miguel in Jerez de la Frontera, to María Dolores Moreno de Arteaga, and the couple had eleven children, Gregorio (1914–1978), Manuel (1915–1994), Francisco (1916–1995), Antonio, Cecilia (1919–1995), María Teresa, María Dolores (1922–1976), Luis Alfonso, Julia (1924–1974), José, María Concepción.

== Sporting career ==
Like all his brothers, Pérez de Guzmán spent his youth in the sporting environment, instilled by his father, a sports lover; for instance, all of the six Pérez de Guzmán brothers played football at their hometown club, Recreativo de Huelva between 1903 and 1920. As the eldest, he was the first Pérez de Guzmán to play in the club's first team, doing so in 1903, aged 15. Together with William Waterson, Antonio Tellechea, Ángel Padilla, and Tomás Estrada, he was a member of the Huelva squad that participated in the 1906 Copa del Rey, which was contested by only three teams, the other two being Athletic Bilbao and Madrid FC (currently known as Real Madrid), with the latter winning it.

When his father became the vice president of Recreativo de Huelva in 1906, he had four of his sons playing for the club, including Manuel. Sometimes, his father is wrongly listed as the club's president from 1907 to 1918, but the only Pérez de Guzmán who presided Recreativo was his eldest son Manuel, from 1935 to 1939, thus becoming only the second former Huelva player to become the club's president, the first being José Ochoa de Mora in 1924–27.

Pérez de Guzmán also played for Huelva from 1910 until his retirement in 1914, aged only 26. On 31 March 1910, Manuel and his younger brother José started for Recreativo in the Seville City Council Cup, helping his side to a 2–0 win over Seville FC at the Plaza de España field. During the first half of the 1910s, he helped Recreativo win three unofficial Andalusian Championship, which Recreativo itself organized, and the Copa Centenario de las Cortes de Cádiz in 1912.

== Death ==
Pérez de Guzmán died in Huelva on 22 January 1957, at the age of 68.

== Honours ==
Recreativo de Huelva

- Andalusian Championship:
  - Champions (3): 1910, 1911, and 1912
- Copa Centenario de las Cortes de Cádiz
  - Champions (1): 1912
