= Lucena del Puerto =

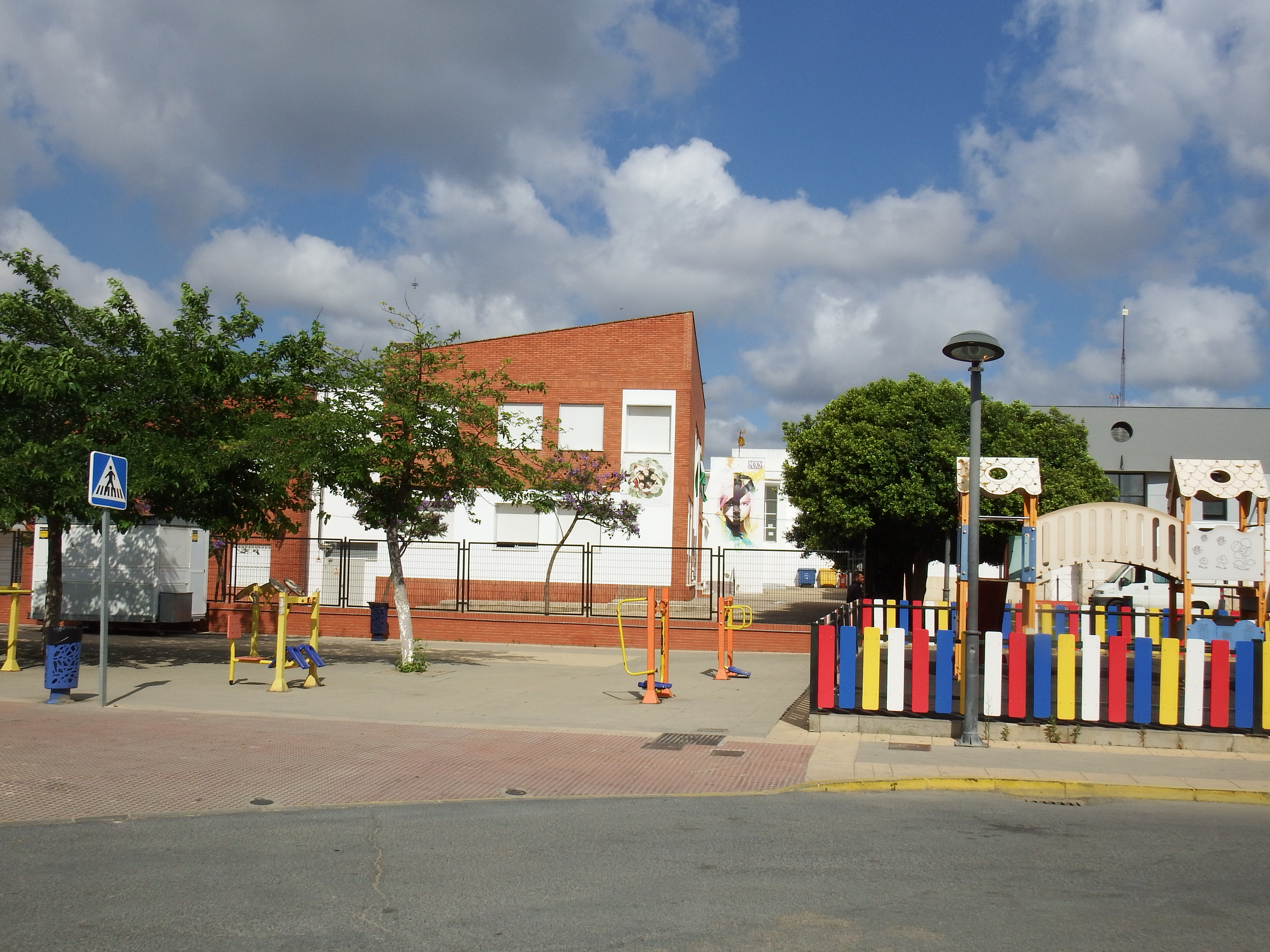

- Flag Coat of arms

- Location of Lucena del Puerto in Spain
- Coordinates: 37°18′N 6°44′W
- Country: Spain
- Autonomous community: Andalusia
- Province: Huelva

Area
  - Total: 69 km^{2} (27 sq mi)
- Elevation: 101 m (331 ft)

Population (2025-01-01)
  - Total: 3,390
  - Density: 49/km^{2} (130/sq mi)
- Time zone: UTC+1 (CET)
  - Summer (DST): UTC+2 (CEST)
- Website: www.lucenadelpuerto.es

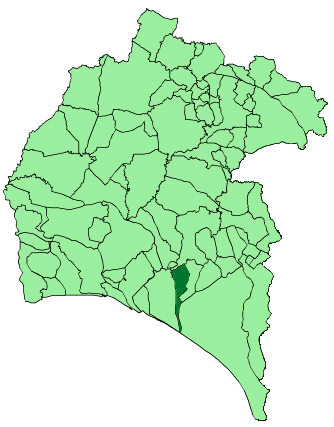
Map of Lucena del Puerto, Huelva

Lucena del Puerto is a town and municipality located in the province of Huelva, Spain. According to the 2025 municipal register, it has a population of 3,390 inhabitants.

== See also ==
- List of municipalities in Huelva
