= Recreativo de Huelva =

- Full name: Real Club Recreativo de Huelva, S.A.D.
- Nicknames: Recre; Decano (Dean); Mineros (Miners); Los blanquiazules (The Blue and Whites)
- Founded: 18 December 1889; 136 years ago as Huelva Recreation Club
- Stadium: Nuevo Colombino
- Capacity: 21,670
- Owner: Adrián Fernández-Romero
- President: Adrián Fernández-Romero
- Head coach: Arzu
- League: Segunda Federación – Group 4
- 2025–26: Segunda Federación – Group 4, 6th of 18
- Website: recreativohuelva.com
Home colours	Away colours	Third colours

Real Club Recreativo de Huelva, S.A.D. (Spanish pronunciation: [reˈal ˈkluβ rekɾeaˈtiβo ðe ˈwelβa]) is a Spanish football club based in Huelva, Andalusia, Spain. Founded on 18 December 1889, they are the oldest football club in Spain, and currently play in Segunda Federación – Group 4, holding home games at Estadio Nuevo Colombino, which has a 21,670 seating-capacity.

Team colours are white shirts with blue vertical stripes and white shorts.

== History ==
=== Background ===
Huelva was introduced to football by the British employees of the Rio Tinto Company Limited (RTCL), who began to arrive in 1873 to work at the copper mines of Rio Tinto. Huelva thus became the home to a vast British colony, among whom a certain William Bice stood out, as he was the one who began organizing the first "kick-abouts" between the club's members, which were possibly the very first kick to a football ball on Spanish soil. (Note: In that same year, another colony of British workers did the same in Vigo, with the investigations about which one was the dean of football in Spain remaining inconclusive and open to debate by historians.) This colony eventually gave birth to a club in 1878, the Rio Tinto English Club (known in Huelva as Club Inglés Bella Vista), where the mine workers played their favorite sports, such as cricket, rugby, and football. The first president of this club was the Scot John Sutherland Mackay, the newly-arrived company doctor. There are reports of football games between Rio Tinto and Huelva as early as 1882, but these teams were never officially established, so there is no legal record of their existence.

The importance of Rio Tinto is that the British left a legacy and ended up creating the Recreativo de Huelva in 1889. There was continuity.

— Alejandro Quiroga

Rio Tinto FC was the catalyst of the Sociedad de Juego de Pelota (Spanish: "Ball Game Society"), which was founded in 1884 by Dr. William Alexander Mackay, the brother of John Sutherland, who was a lover of sports and thus wanted to use physical exercise to improve the health of his patients. He began organizing football and cricket games, usually between his compatriots living in Riotinto and those crews of the British ships, which were held in a large area of marshes filled with flooded soil opposite the Gas Factory run by fellow Scotsman Charles Wilson Adam, who also played in some cricket matches himself.

The earliest known example of this dates dating to March 1888, when the club played football and cricket matches against the sailors of a merchant ship called Jane Cory who had just arrived in port; Mackay even invited a Spaniard Ildefonso Martínez to play. Eventually, in the late 1880s, the local population began gathering there to watch this curious sport, which soon gained followers among the local youth, and as they became familiar with its rules, some of them asked Mackay to participate, which he happily accepted, as he did not conceive of his recreational club as something exclusive to the British colony. Ildefonso Martínez, José García Almansa, Alfonso Le Bourg, and some others, thus became the first Spaniards to play football.

=== Foundation and first matches ===
After a few years of consolidating these sports practices, Mackay and Adam decided to take a further step, so on 18 December 1889, they were among the seven men who founded Huelva Recreation Club, thus becoming the first-ever football club in Spain, although it was originally founded as a sports club that provided physical recreation for the Rio Tinto mineworkers to improve their health. The remaining five founding members were Edward Palin, Alfred Gough, Gavin Speirs, and the only two Spaniards: Pedro Nolasco de Soto and José Muñoz Pérez, both of whom had studied in Britain and thus had a great knowledge of the English language, with Nolasco having previous experience as a director of a sailing club, while Muñoz had a position within the local press. Even though Mackay was the fundamental head behind the club's creation, it was Adam who was elected as the club's first-ever president since he was the eldest of the group and owner of the land where the games were played. This position was then ratified as such at the meeting of 23 December 1889, in which four more members were added for a total of 11; the 27-year-old Speirs, an engineer, was named vice-president, and Palin was named secretary, while Mackay was appointed only as a member of the club's first board of directors.

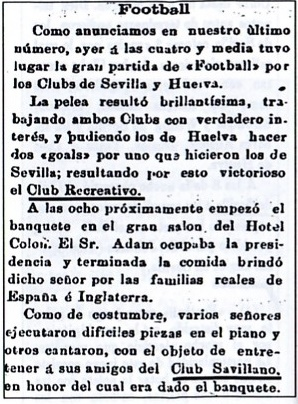
La Provincia newspaper reporting on the match between Club Recreativo and Sevilla FC on 30 March 1890.

After Recreativo de Huelva, Sevilla FC is the next-oldest club in Spain, having been founded just a month later, on 25 January 1890, by Isaias White and Edward Farquharson Johnston, the British vice-consul of Seville, and unlike the Huelva clubs, Sevilla was solely devoted to football, so many considered Spain's first football club. Two months later, on 8 March 1890, these two clubs played the first official football match in Spain at the Hipódromo de Tablada, which was refereed by Johnston, the president of Sevilla, who won the match 2–0; Huelva line-up the following players: William Alcock, Yates, George Wakelin, Guillermo Duclós, Coto, Kirk, Benito Daniel, Curtis, Gibbon, Geraldo Brady, and Smith.

Following the success of the first match, the clubs decided to play a return fixture in Huelva just three weeks later, on 7 April 1890, in front of a crowd of 500, and even though Sevilla scored the opening goal via Gilbert Pollock, thus becoming the first-ever player to score an away goal on Spanish soil, Huelva managed to fight back to win 2–1, partly because they had been fortified by "some athletes from the British colony of Rio-Tinto".

=== 1890s ===
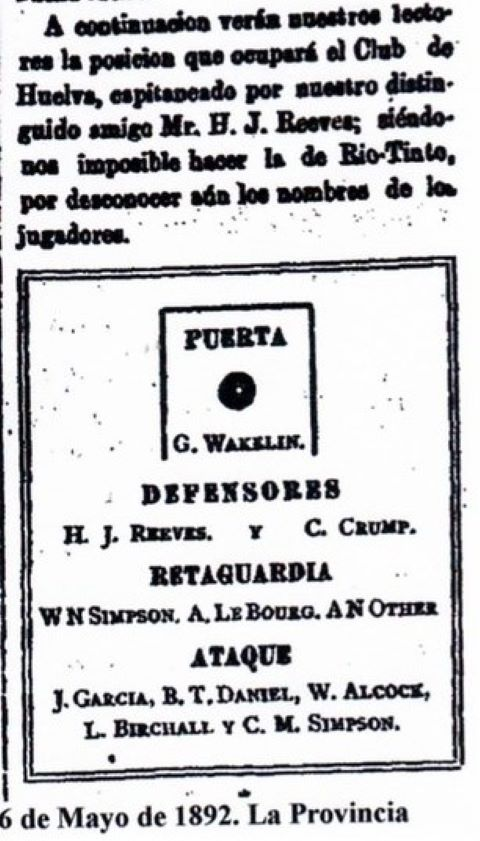
Huelva's line-up in a press release for a match between Recreativo and Riotinto on 6 May 1892.

The Recreation Club demonstrated an organizational capacity that was out of the ordinary for a sports club of that time, playing many more matches against Sevilla and the Club de Río Tinto in the early 1890s, fielding the likes of Wakelin, Alcock, James Reeves, and captain Almansa, who scored a late winner against Sevilla in February 1892. In 1892, Mackay created the club's first crest, the blue and white heart, because those were the colors of the Mackay clan crest, the flags of Scotland and Huelva, and even Lybster FC, his hometown club.

In that same year, Mackay and Adam formed the club's subcommittee charged with planning and supervising the works of the so-called Campo del Velódromo on the plot of land located on the Seville road opposite the Hotel Colon, which was the first sports venue built in Spain for the practice of football, and which was inaugurated on 20 August, just in time to host the sporting events that had been organized by Recreativo in commemoration of the IV Centenary of the Discovery of America. After the departure of Edward Palin in 1891, Muñoz became the new secretary of the club, and as such, he played a key role in the organization of this event that took place between August and October 1892, and whose program remains the oldest surviving original document from Recreativo, in which the club has specific and established rules for football, cricket, and tennis games, hence making them the oldest rules that had been created in Spain in relation to the practice of football.

Charles Adam held the club's presidency from its foundation on 18 December 1889 until his resignation on 29 November 1896, being replaced by Mackay, who, in turn, held this position for nearly three decades until 1924, except for a brief period in 1903. In March 1915 it was William Alexander Mackay himself who hand-delivered to the Minister of the Interior the letter requesting the King Alfonso VIII to accept the Honorary Presidency of the Club, and since then Recreativo has been Royal.

=== First cups ===
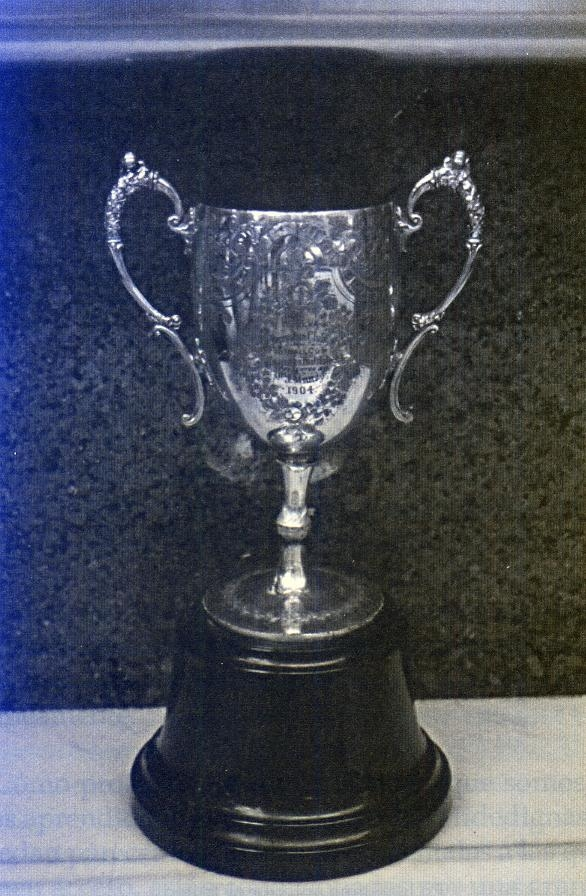
The Seaman's Institute Cup.

In 1891, most of the founders and promoters of Recreativo, including Adam, founded an organization called "Seamen's Institute", which was meant to provide shelter, entertainment, and company to the English sailors who anchored their ships at the port of Huelva for relatively long periods while they waited for the mineral and finished loading it onto the ships. In 1903, after many years as secretary, Muñoz became the vice-president of Recreativo, and later that year, his proposal to create an annual football tournament between Recreativo and the British sailors of the Seamen's Institute was approved at the board meeting held on 9 December 1903. Muñoz decided to follow the footsteps of the Copa del Rey, which had been inaugurated earlier that year with a cup donated by Alfonso XIII, and also ordered a cup made of silver in London, with the first match taking place on 2 January 1904, and being won by the British. This was followed by another match on 30 April, which was postponed to 6 November to coincide with the inauguration of the new facilities at the Velodrome, but the British won again 4–2. It was only two weeks later, on 20 November, that Recreativo finally won this cup, and despite some indications that the club had lifted the Copa de la Raza in 1893 and the Copa Heráldica in 1898, it can be reliably and based on strict documentary evidence that the Copa Seamen's Institute was the first time that a captain of Recreativo lifted a trophy; it was William Alcock, near the Anglican Chapel of the "Seamen's Institute".

After declining invitations in previous years due to financial problems, Recreativo decided to participate in the 1906 edition of the Copa del Rey, playing two matches at the Hipódromo de la Castellana against Athletic Club and Madrid FC (currently known as Athletic Bilbao and Madrid FC), both ending in losses. The Huelva squad that played in this tournament included the likes of Antonio Tellechea, Tomás Estrada, Robert Geoghegham, and William Waterston.

On 1 January 1911, Recreativo achieved its third consecutive victory over the Seamen's (12–0), and in doing so, the Copa Muñoz became the definitive property of Huelva, and it still is the oldest trophy kept by Recreativo in its museum. Muñoz held the club's vice-presidency for three years, until 1906, when he was replaced by the Spaniard Manuel Pérez de Guzmán, whose six sons all played for the club between 1903 and 1920. In the first half of the 1910s, two of the Pérez de Guzmán brothers (Manuel and José), along with Tomás Estrada, played a crucial role in helping the team win three non-official Andalusian regional championships, which Recreativo itself organized, and the Copa Centenario de las Cortes de Cádiz in 1912, beating Español de Cádiz 3–0 in the final. During this period, Estrada was everything at Recreativo: player, captain, referee, and manager, and also correspondent in Huelva for the weekly Madrid Sport.

Huelva also became the first Spanish side to defeat a Portuguese team, winning against Sporting Clube de Portugal. In 1940, it first reached Segunda División, only lasting however one year and not returning until 1957. Since 1965, the team also began hosting the Trofeo Colombino.

=== Later years ===
In 1977–78, led by, amongst others, former Real Madrid youth graduate Hipólito Rincón, Recreativo first gained promotion to the top flight. After just one season, it returned to level two, staying there until 1990, the year of a Segunda División B relegation.

In 1999–2000, Recreativo were due to be relegated to the third division, but were redeemed when Atlético Madrid descended into the second and thus their reserves were ejected. With a new stadium and the appointment of Lucas Alcaraz as manager, and the club returned to the top flight for the first time in 23 years on 19 May 2002 with a 2–1 home win over fellow Andalusians Xerez CD. After this one season at the top, the team was immediately relegated back. However, in the same campaign, it reached the final of the Copa del Rey for the first time, being defeated by Mallorca 0–3 in Elche.

In 2005–06, after beating Numancia on 4 June 2006, Marcelino García Toral's Recreativo mathematically secured promotion with two matches left to be played. Ahead of the new season, the club bought players including France youth international striker Florent Sinama Pongolle from Liverpool, and young winger Santi Cazorla from Villarreal CF, with a budget of only €15 million. The club finished eighth in the table, at 54 points, a best-ever, and made headlines with a 3–0 win against Real Madrid at the Santiago Bernabéu Stadium. The club's leading goalscorer was Sinama Pongolle with 12 goals to his name, while García Toral left at its conclusion for Racing de Santander.

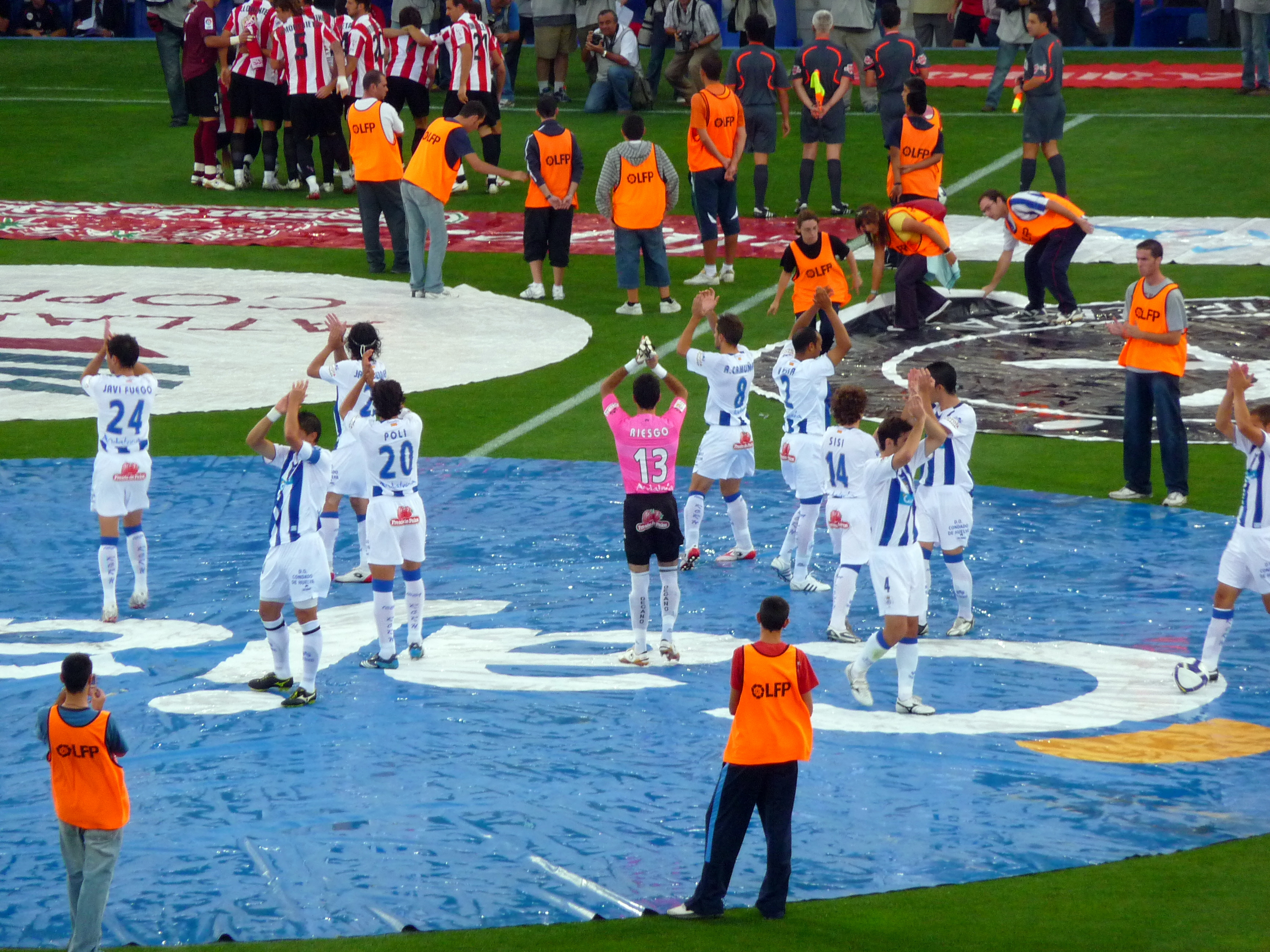
Recre players greeting the fans before a 2008–09 La Liga fixture against Athletic.

Recre narrowly avoided relegation the following season, and in 2008–09, one win in its last 15 matches led to it coming in last place and returning to Segunda after three years. Overspending in aim of returning to the top flight led to debts. At the end of the 2014–15 season, the team fell into Segunda B for the first time in 18 years. A year later, the club was nearing extinction due to financial problems. In May 2021, due to restructuring of the Spanish football league system, the club was relegated two tiers to the fifth level for the first time in its history. Journalist Damián Ortiz of the Diario de Huelva called the entire squad "bastards without honour" and "a black mark on the history of Recreativo de Huelva". In April 2022, Recre achieved promoted back to fourth division. In June 2023, Recre achieved second consecutive promoted to third division after beating Cacereño in last playoff.

== Season to season ==
Season	Tier	Division	Place	Copa del Rey
1939–40	2	2ª	6th	
1940–41	3	3ª	2nd	
1941–42	3	1ª Reg.	1st	
1942–43	3	1ª Reg.	2nd	
1943–44	3	3ª	6th	
1944–45	3	3ª	6th	
1945–46	3	3ª	6th	
1946–47	3	3ª	1st	
1947–48	3	3ª	2nd	
1948–49	3	3ª	4th	
1949–50	3	3ª	4th	
1950–51	3	3ª	1st	
1951–52	3	3ª	6th	
1952–53	3	3ª	8th	
1953–54	3	3ª	10th	
1954–55	3	3ª	5th	
1955–56	3	3ª	7th	
1956–57	3	3ª	1st	
1957–58	2	2ª	15th	
1958–59	3	3ª	1st	

Season	Tier	Division	Place	Copa del Rey
1959–60	2	2ª	13th	
1960–61	3	3ª	1st	
1961–62	2	2ª	5th	
1962–63	2	2ª	5th	
1963–64	2	2ª	11th	
1964–65	2	2ª	9th	
1965–66	2	2ª	11th	
1966–67	2	2ª	11th	
1967–68	2	2ª	13th	
1968–69	3	3ª	1st	
1969–70	3	3ª	4th	
1970–71	3	3ª	3rd	
1971–72	3	3ª	13th	
1972–73	3	3ª	8th	
1973–74	3	3ª	1st	
1974–75	2	2ª	14th	
1975–76	2	2ª	10th	
1976–77	2	2ª	9th	
1977–78	2	2ª	2nd	
1978–79	1	1ª	18th	

Season	Tier	Division	Place	Copa del Rey
1979–80	2	2ª	12th	
1980–81	2	2ª	16th	
1981–82	2	2ª	14th	
1982–83	2	2ª	10th	
1983–84	2	2ª	12th	
1984–85	2	2ª	10th	
1985–86	2	2ª	9th	
1986–87	2	2ª	3rd	
1987–88	2	2ª	15th	
1988–89	2	2ª	5th	
1989–90	2	2ª	19th	
1990–91	3	2ª B	2nd	
1991–92	3	2ª B	6th	
1992–93	3	2ª B	8th	
1993–94	3	2ª B	3rd	
1994–95	3	2ª B	14th	
1995–96	3	2ª B	8th	
1996–97	3	2ª B	4th	
1997–98	3	2ª B	2nd	
1998–99	2	2ª	12th	

Season	Tier	Division	Place	Copa del Rey
1999–2000	2	2ª	21st	
2000–01	2	2ª	6th	
2001–02	2	2ª	3rd	Round of 32
2002–03	1	1ª	18th	Runners-up
2003–04	2	2ª	6th	Second round
2004–05	2	2ª	5th	Round of 16
2005–06	2	2ª	1st	Second round
2006–07	1	1ª	8th	Round of 32
2007–08	1	1ª	16th	Round of 16
2008–09	1	1ª	20th	Round of 32
2009–10	2	2ª	9th	Round of 16
2010–11	2	2ª	12th	Second round
2011–12	2	2ª	17th	Second round
2012–13	2	2ª	13th	Second round
2013–14	2	2ª	8th	Round of 32
2014–15	2	2ª	20th	Third round
2015–16	3	2ª B	13th	First round
2016–17	3	2ª B	12th	
2017–18	3	2ª B	15th	
2018–19	3	2ª B	1st	

Season	Tier	Division	Place	Copa del Rey
2019–20	3	2ª B	13th	Round of 32
2020–21	3	2ª B	8th / 6th	
2021–22	5	3ª RFEF	1st	
2022–23	4	2ª Fed.	2nd	First round
2023–24	3	1ª Fed.	6th	First round
2024–25	3	1ª Fed.	19th	
2025–26	4	2ª Fed.	6th	
2026–27	4	2ª Fed.		First round

- 5 seasons in La Liga
- 38 seasons in Segunda División
- 2 seasons in Primera Federación
- 14 seasons in Segunda División B
- 3 seasons in Segunda Federación
- 23 seasons in Tercera División
- 1 season in Tercera División RFEF
- 2 seasons in Divisiones Regionales

== Current squad ==
As of 6 February 2026.

Note: Flags indicate national team as defined under FIFA eligibility rules; some limited exceptions apply. Players may hold more than one non-FIFA nationality.

No.	Pos.	Nation	Player
1	GK	ESP	Jero Lario
2	DF	URU	Juancho Villegas
3	DF	BLR	Leo Mascaró
4	DF	ESP	Manuel Bonaque
5	DF	ESP	David Alfonso
6	DF	ESP	José Carlos
7	MF	ESP	Paolo Romero
8	MF	ESP	Pepe Mena
9	FW	ESP	Caye Quintana
10	FW	ESP	Antonio Domínguez
11	FW	ESP	Antonio Arcos
12	MF	ESP	Alberto Vela

No.	Pos.	Nation	Player
13	GK	ESP	David Gil
14	FW	ESP	Xabi Dominguez
15	MF	ESP	Álex Bernal
16	MF	ESP	Iván Romero
17	FW	ESP	Aitor García
18	MF	ESP	Javi Castellano
19	DF	ESP	Miki Juanola
20	FW	ESP	Mario da Costa
21	DF	ESP	Alberto López
22	DF	GEQ	Néstor Senra
23	FW	ESP	Roni
24	DF	ESP	Álex Carrasco

== Coaches ==
- (Spain) Fernando Pérez Arroyo (1939–40)
- (Spain) Arcadio Arteaga (1940–41)
- (Hungary) Károly Plattkó (1943–44)
- (Spain) Luís Graiño (1944–45)
- (Spain) Adolfo Bracero (1945–47)
- (England) Basilio Marquínez (1947)
- (Spain) Santiago Núñez Sánchez (1947–48)
- (Spain) Andrés Aranda (1948–49)
- (Spain) Diego Forcén Cabito (1949–50)
- (Spain) José Luis Riera (1950–51)
- (Spain) Diego Villalonga (1951–52)
- (Spain) Leoncito (1952–53)
- (Spain) José Valera Nocera (1953–55)
- (Spain) Andrés Aranda (1955)
- (Spain) Camilo Liz (1955–56)
- (Spain) Juan Ruiz Cambra (1956–58)
- (France) Adolfo Bracero (1958–59)
- (Spain) Francisco Trinchant (1959–60)
- (Spain) Francisco Antúnez (1960–63)
- (Argentina) Juan Rodríguez Aretio (1963–64)
- (Spain) José Luis Riera (1964)
- (Paraguay) Ramón Cobo (1964–66)
- (Spain) Casimiro Benavente (1966–67)
- (Spain) Francisco Antúnez (1967–68)
- (Spain) Enrique Alés (1968–70)
- (Spain) Francisco Antúnez (1970–71)
- (Spain) Vasquero Caño (1971–72)
- (Spain) José Valera Nocera (1972)
- (Spain) Antonio Barrios (1972)
- (Spain) Enrique Alés (1972–74)
- (Spain) Cheché Martín (1974–75)
- (Spain) Santos Bedoya (1975–76)
- (Spain) Eusebio Ríos (1976–79)
- (France) Marcel Domingo (1979)
- (Spain) José Antonio Naya (1979–80)
- (Argentina) Roque Olsen (1980–81)
- (Spain) Jesús Aranguren (1981–84)
- (Spain) Juan Carlos Touriño (1984–85)
- (Uruguay) Víctor Espárrago (1985–87)
- (Argentina) Manolo Cardo (1987–88)
- (Spain) José Ramón Fuertes (1988–89)
- (Spain) Julio Fernández Peguero (1989)
- (Spain) Julio Rubio (1989–90)
- (Spain) Luis del Sol (1990)
- (Spain) Julio Fernández Peguero (1990–91)
- (Spain) José Ramón Fuertes (1991–92)
- (Spain) Cándido Rosado (1992)
- (Spain) Manolo Villanova (1992–96)
- (Spain) Joaquín Caparrós (1996–99)
- (Spain) Luis Alfonso del Barrio (1999–2000)
- (Spain) Julio Fernández Peguero (2000)
- (Spain) Lucas Alcaraz (2000–2003)
- (Spain) Paco Herrera (2003)
- (Croatia) Sergije Krešić (2003–04)
- (Spain) Quique Hernández (2004–05)
- (Spain) Marcelino García Toral (2005–07)
- (Spain) Víctor Muñoz (2007–08)
- (Spain) Manolo Zambrano (2008)
- (Spain) Lucas Alcaraz (2008–09)
- (Spain) Raül Agné (2009–10)
- (Spain) Pablo Alfaro (2010)
- (Spain) Carlos Ríos (2010–11)
- (Spain) Álvaro Cervera (2011–12)
- (Spain) Juanma Pavón (2012)
- (Spain) Sergi Barjuan (2012–14)
- (Spain) José Luis Oltra (2014–15)
- (Spain) Juanma Pavón (2015)
- (Portugal) José Dominguez (2015)
- (Spain) Alejandro Ceballos (2015–17)
- (Spain) Juanma Pavón (2017)
- (Spain) Javier Casquero (2017)
- (Spain) Ángel López (2017–18)
- (Spain) César Negredo (2018)
- (Spain) José María Salmerón (2018–19)
- (Spain) Alberto Monteagudo (2019–2020)
- (Spain) Claudio Barragán (2020–)

== Presidents ==
Dates	Name
1889–96	(Scotland) Charles Wilson Adam
1896–02	(Scotland) William Alexander Mackay
1902–03	(Scotland) E. L. Ricketts
1903–24	(Scotland) William Alexander Mackay
1924–27	(Spain) José Ochoa de Mora
1927–29	(Spain) Montagú Brown
1929–31	(Spain) Manuel Narváez Hernández
1931–32	(Spain) Manuel Narváez Villa
1932	(Spain) José Ramírez Cruzado
1932–33	(Spain) Ramón López García
1933–34	(Spain) Alfredo Fiel

Dates	Name
1934–35	(Spain) Simón Ferrer
1935	(Spain) Arturo López Damas
1935–39	(Spain) Manuel Pérez de Guzmán
1939–40	(Spain) Arturo López Damas
1940–41	(Spain) Juan Estefanía
1941–42	(Spain) Víctor Revilla Alonso
1942–43	(Spain) Antonio Minchón
1943–44	(Spain) Joaquín Maján Guilloto
1944–46	(Spain) Antonio de la Corte Amo
1946–47	(Spain) Pedro Morón Blanco
1947–48	(Spain) Luis Vela Hidalgo

Dates	Name
1948–54	(Spain) Jerónimo Rodriguez
1954–57	(Spain) Ramón López García
1957–59	(Spain) Arturo López Damas
1959–60	(Spain) Luis Pérez de Quevedo
1960–64	(Spain) José Luis Díaz González
1964–67	(Spain) José Luis Martín
1967–70	(Spain) José Luis Díaz González
1970–71	(Spain) Francisco Díaz Ortega
1971–75	(Spain) José Luis Martín
1975–79	(Spain) José Martínez Oliva
1979–84	(Spain) José Muñoz Lozano

Dates	Name
1984–89	(Spain) José Antonio Mancheño
1989–91	(Spain) Juan Andivia Sardiña
1991–92	(Spain) Antonio Pereira Lagares
1992–95	(Spain) Miguel Galardi Cobos
1995–2000	(Spain) Diego de la Villa
2000–01	(Spain) José España Prieto
2001–10	(Spain) Francisco Mendoza
2010–11	(Spain) José Miguel de la Corte
2011–15	(Spain) Pablo Comas
2015–16	(Spain) Benjamín Naranjo
2016–21	(Spain) Manuel Zambrano Díaz
2021–23	(Spain) José Antonio Sotomayor
2023–present	(Spain) Jesús Vázquez

== Honours ==
- Segunda División
  - Winners (1): 2005–06
- Tercera Federación
  - Winners (1): 2021–22
- Extremadura Championship
  - Winners (3): 1932–33, 1933–34, 1934–35
- Trofeo Colombino
  - Winners (14): 1965, 1967, 1977, 1979, 1986, 1987, 1998, 2000, 2003, 2004, 2008, 2010, 2016, 2017

== International players ==
- (Argentina) Marco Ruben
- (Austria) Hubert Baumgartner
- (Colombia) Edwin Congo
- (Ivory Coast) Kanga Akalé
- (Equatorial Guinea) Rodolfo Bodipo
- (Equatorial Guinea) Juan Cuyami
- (Equatorial Guinea) Juan Epitié
- (Equatorial Guinea) Juvenal
- (Equatorial Guinea) Yago Yao
- (France) Florent Sinama Pongolle
- (Ghana) Emmanuel Agyemang-Badu
- (Hungary) Ferenc Plattkó
- (Nigeria) Ikechukwu Uche
- (Paraguay) Virgilio Ferreira
- (Paraguay) Herminio Toñánez
- (Paraguay) Nelson Zelaya
- (Poland) Paweł Brożek
- (Portugal) Beto
- (Portugal) Carlos Martins
- (Portugal) Mário Silva
- (Portugal) Silvestre Varela
- (Romania) Laurențiu Roșu
- (South Africa) Nasief Morris
- (Spain) Luis Aragonés
- (Spain) Santi Cazorla
- (Spain) Gerard
- (Spain) Daniel Güiza
- (Spain) Julio Alberto
- (Spain) Juanito
- (Spain) José María Maguregui
- (Spain) Manolin
- (Spain) Manu
- (Spain) Enrique Mateos
- (Spain) Mariano Pernía
- (Spain) Poli Rincon
- (Spain) Curro Torres
- (Switzerland) Alain Nef
- (Turkey) Ersen Martin
- (Uruguay) Martín Cáceres
- (Uruguay) Víctor Espárrago
- (Uruguay) Arsenio Luzardo
- (Venezuela) Andreé González
- (Venezuela) Josmar Zambrano
