= Port of Huelva =

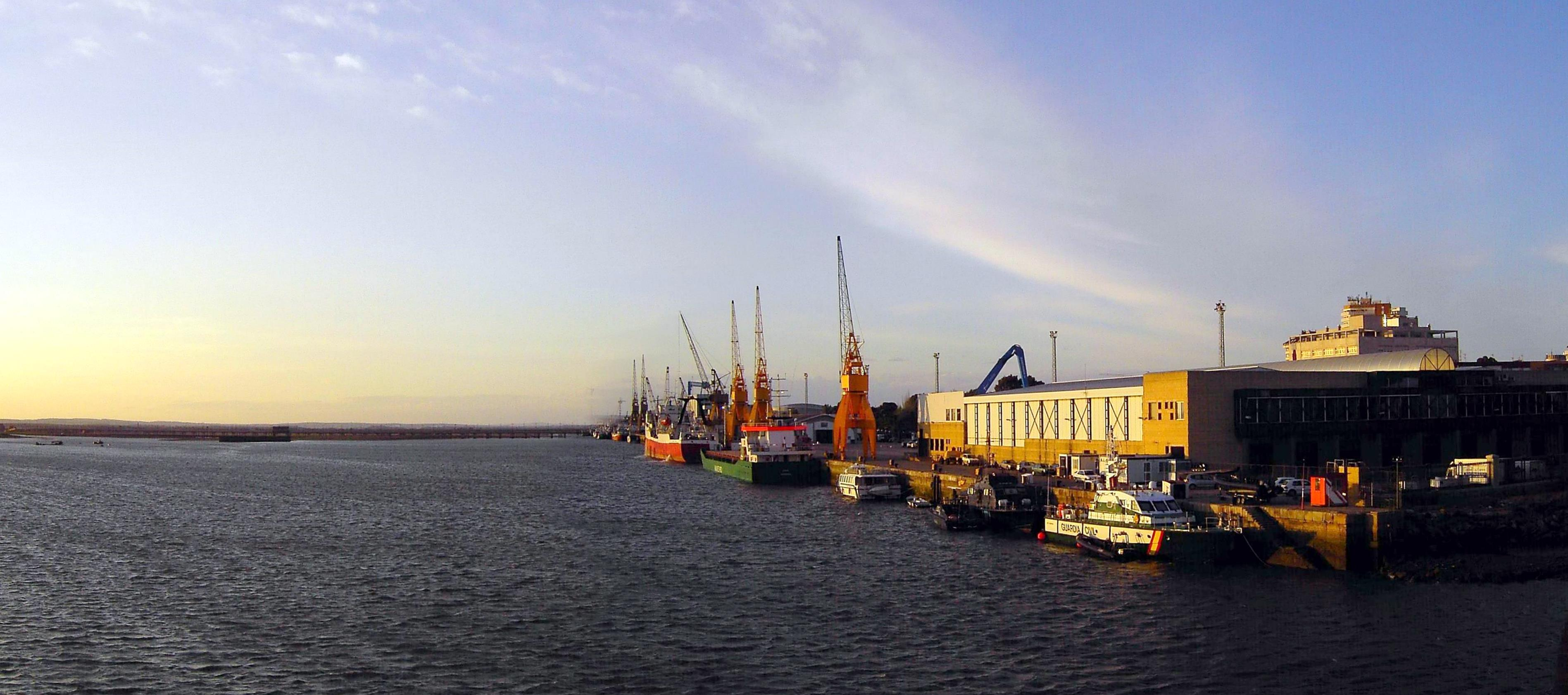
- Interactive map of Port of Huelva
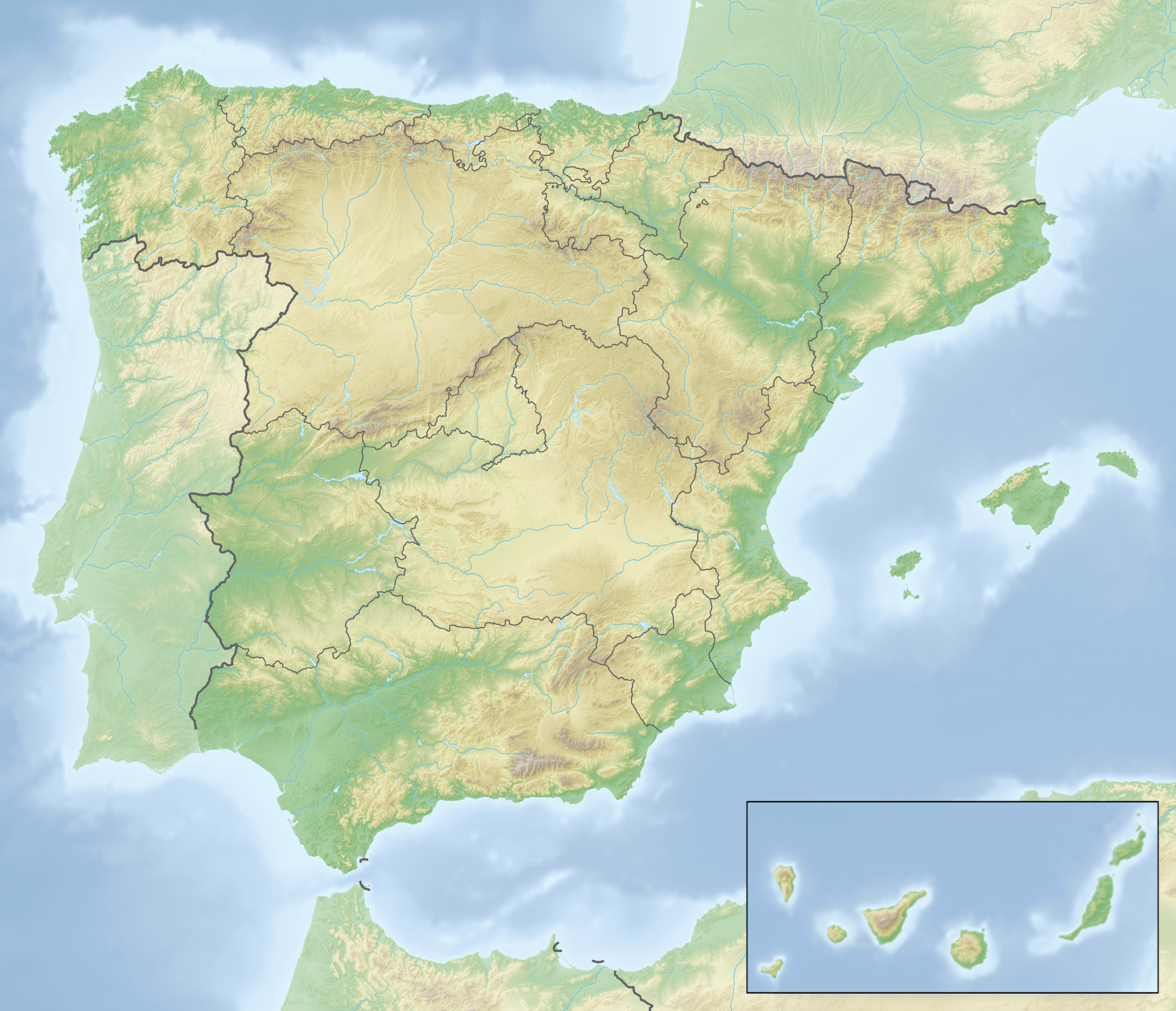
- Location in Spain

Location
- Country: Spain
- Location: Huelva, Palos de la Frontera
- Coordinates: 37.198685°N 6.937533°W
- UN/LOCODE: ESHUV

Details
- Operated by: Port Authority of Huelva

Statistics
- Annual cargo tonnage: 33.8 million tonnes (2019)
- Annual container volume: 70,852 TEU (2019)

The Port of Huelva is a cargo and fishing port located off the Spanish southwestern coast, belonging to the municipalities of Huelva and Palos de la Frontera. With a total annual traffic capacity of 33.8 million tonnes, it is the second biggest port in Andalusia after the Port of Algeciras.

== Description ==
The port is located in the estuary formed by the Odiel and Río Tinto rivers. It is operated by the Port Authority of Huelva. It is divided into two sectors: the Inner Port (in the city) and the Outer Port (the main port). The Inner Port's single wharf, the East Wharf, is the one used for smaller traffic including tourist boats. The Outer Port, with six wharves, is located to the south of the River Tinto.

== History ==
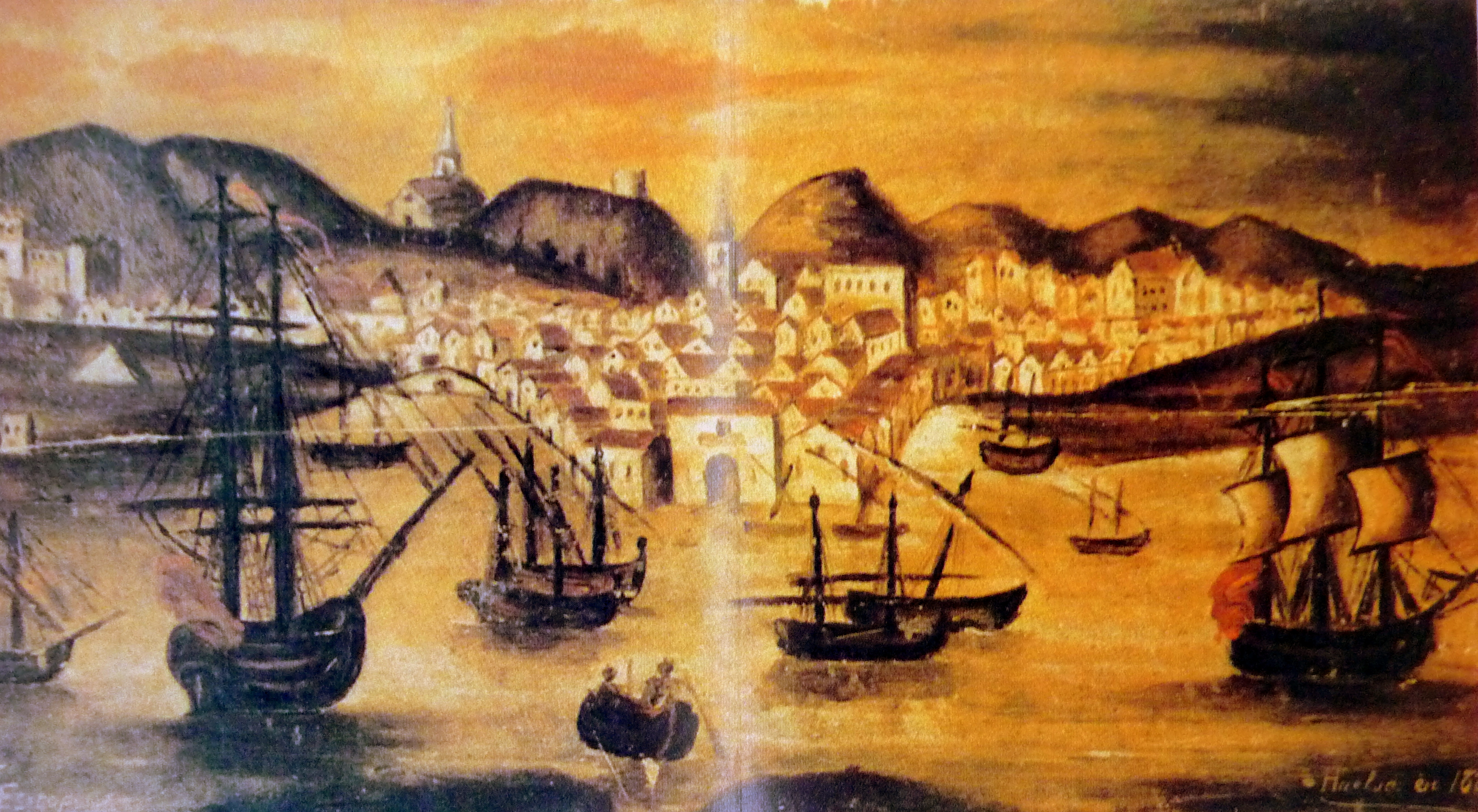
18th century depiction of the port and the city of Huelva

Rich in metals, the Huelva region was known to be an exporter of silver already in Antiquity in the context of the "Tartessos" culture. The mining activity was resumed by the Romans.

The precursor of the current Port Authority of Huelva, the Junta Especial de Comercio y Puerto de Huelva, was created on 8 December 1873, during a period of resurgence of the mining activity in the province of Huelva thanks to the injection of foreign capital and technology. The Muelle de Riotinto was built in 1874-76 for the export of ore from Huelva to Britain. It is no longer in commercial use but is now a tourist attraction.

The East Wharf replaced constructed harbour facilities of inferior quality between 1900 and 1910.

In the 1960s much of the activity was moved to the Puerto Exterior, located in Palos de la Frontera, more apt for ships with greater draft: as it was passed the project for a mineral loading dock and an oil dock in Torre Arenilla in 1963, the Levante dock (in the Puerto Interior) was mostly left for fishing, specializing in the commercialization of frozen fish.

The Outer Port was built in 1965. The Inner Port, which incorporates the East Wharf, was constructed in 1972.

== Statistics ==
Freight volume:

| Year | Freight traffic (Tn) | Liquid bulk (Tn) | Solid bulk (Tn) | Other (Tn) | Containers (TEU) |
|---|---|---|---|---|---|
| 2013 | 26,369,503 | 21,488,718 | 4,145,909 | 137,783 | 3,116 |
| 2014 | 27,246,080 | 21,863,372 | 4,662,814 | 197,759 | 5,774 |
| 2015 | 27,375,435 | 21,598,676 | 5,137,350 | 159,384 | 7,834 |
| 2016 | 30,557,171 | 24,136,062 | 5,759,383 | 175,943 | 11,822 |
| 2017 | 32,332,572 | 24,904,547 | 6,487,378 | 155,200 | 58,916 |
| 2018 | 32,966,864 | 25,119,931 | 6,662,399 | 199,780 | 70,288 |

== Bibliography ==
- Couceiro Martínez, Luis; Serrano Pérez, Marta; Magro Andrade, Rafael (2013). "Competitividad de un Puerto y su Relación Actual con el Sistema Portuario Español". Tecnologí@ y desarrollo. XI. Universidad Alfonso X el Sabio. ISSN 1696-8085.
- Mojarro Bayo, Ana María; Romero Macias, Emilio Manuel (2012). "The port of Huelva and the resurgence of mining (1873-1930)". Boletín Geológico y Minero. 123 (1): 3–15. ISSN 0366-0176.
- Ruiz Romero de la Cruz, Elena (2004). "Historia económica del puerto de Huelva". Historia de la navegación comercial española. Ministerio de Fomento. Puertos del Estado. (Spain).
