= Copa Rodríguez Arzuaga =

- Organiser(s): Royal Madrid Football Federation
- Founded: 1910
- Abolished: 1913
- Region: Spain
- Teams: 3 to 4 teams
- Last champions: (Community of Madrid) Atlético Madrid (1st title)
- Most championships: (Community of Madrid) Sociedad Gimnástica (2 titles)

The Copa Rodríguez Arzuaga (Spanish: Rodríguez Arzuaga Cup was a friendly football competition contested by clubs from Madrid which ran from 1910 until 1913. It was named in honor of the donator of the trophy, Manuel Rodríguez Arzuaga, one of the founders of Atlético Madrid.

All editions of the competition were held in league form, with the winner being the one who, in the end, obtained the greatest number of points. The registration was open to all Madrid clubs of the time, with the city's biggest clubs, especially Madrid FC, often competing with their second and third teams. The four most important Madrid clubs participated in its inaugural edition in 1910, which was held between January and February. The first third editions were won by Sociedad Gimnástica while the second and fourth were won by Madrid FC and Atlético respectively. In the fourth and last edition in 1914, Madrid FC refused to participate.

Notably, Atlético played its first game as a red and white team in the second edition of this competition on 22 January 1911. Notable figures of this tournament are Santiago Bernabéu, Pichichi, Ricardo Zamora, Josep Samitier and Paulino Alcántara.

== Copa Rodríguez Arzuaga I ==
In the inaugural edition, the four most important Madrid clubs of that time participated, Atlético Madrid, Madrid FC, Español de Madrid, and Sociedad Gimnástica, which was held between January and February and contested by the first, second and third teams of each club. It was won by Gimnástica with 13 points (6 wins, 1 draw, and 2 losses) followed by Atlético Madrid with 8 points (4 wins and 4 losses), Madrid FC with 7 points (3 wins, 1 draw and 4 losses) and Español at 6 points (3 wins and 6 losses).

=== Results ===
| Date | Local | Result | Visitor | Refs |
|---|---|---|---|---|
| 23 January 1910 | Madrid FC | 0–3 | Club Español de Madrid | |
| 23 January 1910 | Atlético Madrid | 1–2 | RS Gimnástica | |
| 30 January 1910 | Madrid FC | 0–0 | RS Gimnástica | |
| 30 January 1910 | Madrid FC's 2nd team | 4–1 | Español de Madrid's 2nd team | |
| 30 January 1910 | Club Español de Madrid | 4–0 | Atlético Madrid | |
| 2 February 1910 | Madrid FC | 3–1 | Atlético Madrid | |
| 2 February 1910 | RS Gimnástica | 0–3 | Club Español de Madrid | |
| 6 February 1910 | Atlético Madrid's 2nd team | 4–1 | Club Español de Madrid’s 2nd team | |
| 6 February 1910 | Madrid FC’s 2nd team | 1–3 | RS Gimnástica’s 2nd team | |
| 13 February 1910 | Atlético Madrid's 2nd team | 2–0 | Madrid FC’s 2nd team | |
| 20 February 1910 | RS Gimnástica's 3rd team | 1–0 | Atlético Madrid's 3rd team | |
| 20 February 1910 | Club Español de Madrid's 3rd team | Not played | Madrid FC's 3rd team | |
| 27 February 1910 | Madrid FC's 3rd team | 2–0 | Gimnástica's 3rd team | |
| 6 March 1910 | Madrid FC's 3rd team | Not played | Atlético Madrid's 3rd team | |
| 13 March 1910 | RS Gimnástica | 2–0 | Atlético Madrid | |

| Team | Points | J | G | E | P | GF | GC |
|---|---|---|---|---|---|---|---|
| RS Gimnástica | 13 | 9 | 6 | 1 | 2 | 13 | 10 |
| Club Español de Madrid | 8 | 9 | 4 | 0 | 5 | 14 | 9 |
| Madrid FC | 7 | 8 | 3 | 1 | 4 | 10 | 15 |
| Athletic Club de Madrid | 6 | 8 | 3 | 0 | 5 | 10 | 15 |

== Copa Rodríguez Arzuaga II ==
The second edition of the Rodríguez Arzuaga was contested by the first, second, and third teams of Madrid FC, Atlético Madrid, and Sociedad Gimnástica, and held at the Madrid and Atlético fields in front of an enthusiastic and large audience. On 22 January 1911, Atlético debuted its new clothing, the now famous red–and–white shirts, in a match against Gimnástica at the Campo del Retiro. The match was not finished because Gimnástica left the field after the referee validated an athletic goal that meant the victory of the red and whites. Madrid won the Cup with 9 points (3 wins and 3 draws) ahead of Atlético with 7 points (2 wins, 3 draws and 1 loss), and Gimnástica with 2 points (2 draws and losses).

Notably, in the meeting between the first teams of Madrid and Atlético played on 30 January, which ended in a 1–1 draw, Atlético's goalkeeper Luis Astorquia, after saving a shot from Luis Saura, took the ball and avoided the opposing forwards to reach almost half the field with it, but immediately afterwards, Madrid retrieved it and threw it towards Astorquia's goal again, where almost all of Madrid's forwards were fighting with Athletic's defenders, which gave enough time to Astorquia to run from midfield and arriving on goal at the same moment that they shoot, producing a save that drew thunderous cheers from the spectators.

On 19 November 1911, the Copa Julián Ruete was held for the first time, organized by Atlético Madrid. The results for the host team were a one–goal tie with the first team of Madrid FC and a 3–0 victory over the second team of Gimnástica, both matches played on the Ciudad Lineal field.

=== Results ===
| Date | Local | Result | Visitor |
|---|---|---|---|
| 22 January 1911 | Atlético Madrid's 2nd team | ret | RS Gimnástica |
| 29 January 1911 | Madrid FC | 2–1 | RS Gimnástica |
| 29 January 1911 | Madrid FC's 2nd team | 3–1 | RS Gimnástica’s 2nd team |
| 02 February 1911 | Atlético Madrid | 1–1 | Madrid FC |
| 02 February 1911 | Atlético Madrid's 2nd team | 2–2 | Madrid FC’s 2nd team |
| 06 February 1911 | RS Gimnástica | 2–2 | Atlético Madrid |
| 12 February 1911 | Madrid FC's 3rd team | 1–1 | RS Gimnástica's 3rd team |
| 19 February 1911 | Madrid FC's 3rd team | 1–0 | Atlético Madrid's 2nd team |

| Teams | Points | J | G | E | P | GF | GC |
|---|---|---|---|---|---|---|---|
| Madrid FC | 9 | 6 | 3 | 3 | 0 | 10 | 6 |
| Atlético Madrid | 7 | 6 | 2 | 3 | 1 | 8 | 8 |
| RS Gimnástica | 2 | 6 | 0 | 2 | 4 | 7 | 11 |

== Copa Rodríguez Arzuaga III ==
The third edition of the Copa Rodríguez Arzuaga was held in January and February 1912, and it was played between the first, second, and third teams of the four most important clubs in the capital. Gimnástica won the title after a close fight with Español, while Madrid and Atlético performed at a level well below their usual level.

=== Results ===
| Date | Local | Result | Visitor | Refs |
|---|---|---|---|---|
| 29 January 1912 | Atlético Madrid | 1–1 | Club Español de Madrid | |
| 04 February 1912 | Atlético Madrid | 1–3 | Madrid FC | |
| 25 February 1912 | Atlético Madrid | 1–1 | RS Gimnástica | |
| 03 March 1912 | Atlético Madrid's 2nd team | 2–1 | Madrid FC's 2nd team | |
| 10 March 1912 | Madrid FC | 2–0 | RS Gimnástica | |
| 17 March 1912 | Madrid FC's 2nd team | 1–3 | RS Gimnástica’s 2nd team | |

== Copa Rodríguez Arzuaga IV ==
The fourth and last edition was held in April 1913 and was contested only by Atlético, Español, and Cardenal Cisneros Club. It was won by its organizers, Atlético, who defeated the other two sides.

=== Results ===
| Date | Local | Result | Visitor | Refs |
|---|---|---|---|---|
| 07 April 1913 | Atlético Madrid | 1–0 | Club Cardenal Cisneros | |
| 07 April 1913 | Atlético Madrid | 9–1 | Club Cardenal Cisneros | |
| 11 April 1913 | Club Español de Madrid | 0–2 | Atlético Madrid | |

== See also ==
UEFA Regions' Cup
