= Catalonia national football team results =

This is a list of results for the matches played since 1910 by the Catalonia national football team, (Note: The association football team representing the autonomous region of Catalonia, a territory which is ultimately administered by Spain and its governing body in the sport.) including unofficial friendly matches against full FIFA international teams, and others against fellow representative teams which are not aligned to FIFA. Catalonia also played many challenge matches against professional clubs including Atlante, Atlético Madrid, Athletic Bilbao, Barcelona, Bologna, Bordeaux, Colo-Colo, Espanyol, Mallorca, Nacional, Real Madrid, Sunderland, Swansea City and Torino.

Since the 1990s, they have concentrated on arranging fixtures likely to improve perception of the team as a full international selection, as opposed to entering competitions for regions such as the CONIFA World Football Cup.

== Fixtures and results ==
=== Against non-FIFA national/regional teams ===
24 July 1910 Friendly	Paris	3–1	Catalonia	San Sebastián
	Triboulet; Matthey		Comamala

3 January 1915 Friendly	(Note: Playing as the North Federation team (Spanish: Equipo de la Norte Federación), including Cantabria.)Basque Country	6–1	Catalonia	Bilbao, Basque Country
	Pichichi; Pagaza; Patricio	Report	Kinké	Stadium: San Mamés; Attendance: 6,000

7 February 1915 Friendly	Catalonia	2–2	Basque Country	Barcelona, Catalonia
	Monistrol; Kinké		Reguera (o.g.); Belauste	Stadium: Camp de la Indústria; Attendance: 5,000; Referee: (Catalonia) Emilio Sampere

10 May 1915 1915 Prince of Asturias Cup	(Note: The Central Federation team (Spanish: Equipo de la Centro Federación), including Madrid and the wider Castile region.)Castile	1–2	Catalonia	Madrid
	Petit	Report	Alcántara; Baró	Stadium: Campo de O'Donnell; Referee: (Community of Madrid) Julián Ruete

12 May 1915 1915 Prince of Asturias Cup	Basque Country	1–0	Catalonia	Madrid
	Legarreta	Report		Stadium: Campo de O'Donnell; Referee: (Community of Madrid) Bernardo Menéndez

10 October 1915 Friendly	Catalonia	0–0	Castile	Barcelona, Catalonia
		Report		Stadium: Camp Muntaner; Referee: Hamilton

31 October 1915 Friendly	Catalonia	2–1	Gipuzkoa	Barcelona, Catalonia
		Report		Stadium: Camp Muntaner

1 November 1915 Friendly	Catalonia	2–2	Gipuzkoa	Barcelona, Catalonia
	Casellas; Kinké	Report	M. Sena	Stadium: Camp Muntaner

15 December 1915 Friendly	Gipuzkoa	4–3	Catalonia	San Sebastián, Basque Country
				Referee: Sabata

26 December 1915 Friendly	Gipuzkoa	0–4	Catalonia	Irun, Gipuzkoa
				Stadium: Estadio de Amute; Referee: Martí

6 January 1916 Friendly	Castile	0–4	Catalonia	Madrid
		Report		Stadium: Campo de O'Donnell; Referee: Hamilton

11 May 1916 1916 Prince of Asturias Cup	Castile	3–6	Catalonia	Madrid
	Álvarez 15'; Bernabéu 40'; Larrañaga 80' (pen.)	Report; Report2	Cabedo 12', 20', 35', 60'; Sampere 30'; Kinké 50'	Stadium: Campo de O'Donnell; Referee: (Community of Madrid) Carlos Dieste

13 May 1916 1916 Prince of Asturias Cup	Castile	2–2	Catalonia	Madrid
16:30 CEST	Kinké 75', 80' (pen.)	Report; Report2	De Miguel 50'; Larrañaga 70'	Stadium: Campo de O'Donnell; Referee: (Community of Madrid) Carlos Dieste

21 May 1916 Friendly	Catalonia	1–3	Basque Country	Barcelona, Catalonia
	Kinké	Report	Patricio; Chacho; Pichichi	Stadium: Camp de la Indústria

22 May 1916 Friendly	Catalonia	0–0	Basque Country	Barcelona, Catalonia
		Report		Stadium: Camp de la Indústria

4 June 1916 Friendly	Basque Country	5–0	Catalonia	Bilbao, Basque Country
	Patricio; Legarreta			Stadium: San Mamés; Referee: Luis Hurtado

9 May 1917 1917 Prince of Asturias Cup	Castile	2–2	Catalonia	Madrid
	Villaverde		Gumbau; Alcover	Stadium: Campo de O'Donnell; Referee: (Community of Madrid) Carlos Dieste

10 May 1917 1917 Prince of Asturias Cup	(Note: The Cantabric (Spanish: Cantábrico) team, including Asturias and Cantabria.)Cantabric (Asturias) (Cantabria)	0–1	Catalonia	Madrid
		Report	Gumbau 30'	Stadium: Campo de O'Donnell; Referee: (Community of Madrid) Bernardo Menéndez

15 May 1917 1917 Prince of Asturias Cup Final	Castile	2–0; Abandoned (Note: The match was abandoned before the end after a goal scored directly from a corner, then not permitted in the rules by Catalonia was disallowed, resulting in their players protecting vehemetly to the point where the referee called the match off.)	Catalonia	Madrid
	Mieg 50'; Agüero 60'	Report; Report2		Stadium: Campo de O'Donnell; Referee: (Community of Madrid) Julián Ruete

14 October 1917 Friendly	Catalonia	1–0	Castile	Barcelona, Catalonia
	Monistrol			Stadium: Camp Muntaner; Referee: (Community of Madrid) Paco Bru

31 January 1920 Friendly	Catalonia	2–1	Biscay	Barcelona, Catalonia
	Coca; Domènech	Report	Carmelo	Stadium: Camp Muntaner; Referee: Francisco Torrents

1 February 1920 Friendly	Catalonia	3–1	Biscay	Barcelona, Catalonia
	Domènech; Martínez	Report	Carmelo	Stadium: Camp de la Indústria

6 February 1921 Friendly	Catalonia	5–1	(Aquitaine) South West France	Barcelona, Catalonia
	Alcántara; Domènech; Mallorquí	Report	Bourbon	Stadium: Camp Muntaner

9 February 1921 Friendly	Catalonia	3–1	(Aquitaine) South West France	Barcelona, Catalonia
	Sancho; Blanco	Report	Bourbon	Stadium: Camp Muntaner

3 April 1921 Friendly	Catalonia	4–0	Provence	Barcelona, Catalonia
		Report		Stadium: Camp de la Indústria; Referee: Massana

4 April 1921 Friendly	Catalonia	1–0	Provence	Barcelona, Catalonia
				Stadium: Camp de la Indústria; Referee: Timer

19 November 1922 1922–23 Prince of Asturias Cup quarter-finals	Gipuzkoa	0–3	Catalonia	Irun, Gipuzkoa
		Report	Samitier 19'; Gràcia 37'; Martí 80'	Stadium: Estadio de Amute; Attendance: 6,000; Referee: (Community of Madrid) Eulogio Aranguren

14 January 1923 1922–23 Prince of Asturias Cup semi-finals	Asturias	1–0	Catalonia	Gijón, Asturias
	Zabala 89'	Report		Stadium: El Molinón; Attendance: 6,000; Referee: (Basque Country (autonomous community)) Torra

25 November 1923 1923–24 Prince of Asturias Cup quarter-finals	Catalonia	2–1	Gipuzkoa	Barcelona, Catalonia
	Olivella 22'; Pellicer 29'	Report	Petit 51'	Stadium: Camp de Les Corts; Referee: (Catalonia) Agustín Cruella Tena

27 January 1924 1923–24 Prince of Asturias Cup semi-finals	Catalonia	1–0	Biscay	Barcelona, Catalonia
	Martí	Report		Stadium: Camp de Les Corts; Referee: (Community of Madrid) Francisco Contreras

24 February 1924 1923–24 Prince of Asturias Cup Final	Catalonia	4–4 (a.e.t.)	Castile	Bilbao
	Samitier 35', 38'; Piera 57'; Sagibarba 118'	Report; Report2	Pérez 8'; Triana 42', 75'; Monjardín 95'	Stadium: San Mamés; Referee: (Basque Country (autonomous community)) Murguia

26 February 1924 1923–24 Prince of Asturias Cup; Final Replay	Catalonia	3–2	Castile	Bilbao
	Carulla (1-0); Samitier (2-2); Piera (3-2)	Report; Report2	Monjardín (1-1)	Stadium: San Mamés; Referee: (Cantabria) Fermín Sánchez

10 May 1925 Friendly	Catalonia	2–1	(Languedoc) South East France	Barcelona
	Martínez; Cros		Kramer	Stadium: Guinardó; Referee: (Catalonia) Josep Llovera

1 November 1925 Friendly	Paris	2–3	Catalonia	Hauts-de-Seine, France
	Cordon; Maulene	Report	Samitier; Cros; Martínez	Stadium: Stade de Colombes; Referee: Charles Van Veegaete

16 May 1926 Friendly	Catalonia	4–0	Paris	Barcelona, Catalonia
	Sastre; Pedrol; Broto	Report		Stadium: Camp de Les Corts; Referee: Mariné

11 July 1926 Friendly	Zürich (Canton of Zurich)	2–5	Catalonia	Zürich, Switzerland
	Fink 15'; Perotti 62'	Report	Pedrol 6'; Sastre 30'; Samitier 31'; Broto	Stadium: Stade de Colombes; Referee: Herrer

5 September 1926 1926 Prince of Asturias Cup first leg	Asturias	0–2	Catalonia	Gijón, Asturias
		Report; Report2	Broto 22', 80'	Stadium: El Molinón; Referee: (Basque Country (autonomous community)) Steimborn Ludeuvik

19 September 1926 1926 Prince of Asturias Cup second leg	Catalonia	4–3	Asturias	Barcelona
	Forgas 10', 82'; Pellicer 59'; Alcántara 79'	Report; Report2	Avilesu 5'; Herrera 85', 87'	Stadium: Guinardó; Referee: (Basque Country (autonomous community)) Steimborn Ludeuvik

15 May 1927 Friendly	Catalonia	3–0	Castile	Barcelona, Catalonia
	Sastre 8', 11', 88'			Stadium: Camp de Les Corts; Referee: (Catalonia) Agustín Cruella Tena

16 June 1927 Friendly	Catalonia	9–0	Brussels	Barcelona, Catalonia
	Sastre; Samitier; Piera; Tena II	Report		Stadium: Camp de Les Corts

27 October 1927 Friendly	Castile	4–0	Catalonia	Madrid
				Stadium: Estadio Metropolitano

8 June 1930 Friendly	Catalonia	0–1	Basque Country	Barcelona, Catalonia
16:45		Report	Gorostiza	Stadium: Montjuïc; Attendance: 45,000

22 June 1930 Friendly	Aragon	3–1	Catalonia	Zaragoza, Aragon
	Burillo	Report	Álamo	Stadium: Campo de la Torre de Bruil

24 September 1930 Friendly	Catalonia	3–0	Castile	Barcelona, Catalonia
	Ventolrà 24'; Goiburu 57'; Arocha 70'			Stadium: Camp de Les Corts

1 January 1931 Friendly	Basque Country	3–2	Catalonia	Bilbao, Basque Country
	Olivares 32', 39'; Lafuente 36'	Report	Samitier 17'; Arocha	Stadium: San Mamés; Referee: Malcón

6 January 1931 Friendly	Castile	1–1	Catalonia	Madrid
	Marín	Report	Sagi-Barba	Stadium: Estadio Chamartín

4 June 1931 Friendly	Catalonia	1–0	Prague XI	Barcelona, Catalonia
				Stadium: Camp de Les Corts

14 April 1932 Friendly	Catalonia	1–1	Castile	Barcelona, Catalonia
	Samitier		Losada	Stadium: Estadi d'Montjuïc

27 August 1933 Friendly	Catalonia	3–1	Budapest	Barcelona, Catalonia
	Solé 5'; Arocha 41'; Bosch 75'	Report	Dudás 49'	Stadium: Sarrià Stadium

12 May 1935 Friendly	Catalonia	1–7	Sunderland	Catalonia
	Escolà		Gurney; Gallacher; Carter; Davis

24 September 1935 Friendly	Catalonia	2–0	Andalusia	Barcelona, Catalonia
	Bosch 38'; Raich 77'			Stadium: Estadi d'Montjuïc; Referee: Jesús Arribas

1 January 1936 Friendly	Andalusia	5–1	Catalonia	Seville, Andalusia
		Report	Raich	Stadium: Estadio de Nervión; Referee: Ocaña

18 October 1936 Friendly	Catalonia	2–0	Valencian Community	Barcelona, Catalonia
	Betancourt 15'; Juan Ramón 63' (o.g.)			Stadium: Camp de Les Corts

15 November 1936 Friendly	Valencian Community	4–0	Catalonia	Valencia, Valencian Community
	Goiburu; Langarita			Stadium: Mestalla Stadium; Referee: Tamarit

16 March 1941 Friendly	Castile	4–3	Catalonia	Madrid
	Pruden; Barinaga		Martínez	Stadium: Estadio Chamartín

15 March 1942 Friendly	Catalonia	4–3	Castile	Barcelona, Catalonia
	Gràcia; Mas unknown Martín			Stadium: Camp de Les Corts; Referee: A. Vilalta

13 October 1943 Friendly	Castile	1–5	Catalonia	Madrid
	Alonso		César; Martín; Escolà; Bravo	Stadium: Estadio Chamartín

27 March 1944 Friendly	Valencian Community	3–4	Catalonia	Valencia, Valencian Community
	Epi; Igoa; Gorostiza		Valle; Martín; César	Stadium: Mestalla Stadium; Referee: Tamarit

23 April 1944 Friendly	Catalonia	2–2	Valencian Community	Barcelona, Catalonia
	Bravo; Martín (pen.)	Report	Pasieguito; Gorostiza	Stadium: Camp de Les Corts

23 June 1946 Friendly	Catalonia	5–2	Castile	Barcelona, Catalonia
	Calvo; Sospedra; Pallàs; Mencia (o.g.)		Pruden; Juncosa	Stadium: Camp de Les Corts

12 January 1947 Friendly	Catalonia	3–3	Stuttgart XI	Barcelona, Catalonia
				Stadium: Camp de Les Corts

6 July 1947 Friendly	Stuttgart XI	1–2	Catalonia	Stuttgart
				Stadium: Century Stadium

21 March 1948 Friendly	Barcelona	5–3	Catalonia	Barcelona, Catalonia
				Stadium: Camp de Les Corts

26 June 1954 Friendly	Hamburg	1–3	Catalonia	Hamburg, Germany
	Wehrmann	Report	Arcas; Tejada; Basora	Stadium: Volksparkstadion; Attendance: 40,000; Referee: Arthur Luty (England)

12 July 1957 Friendly	Catalonia	4–1	(Rio de Janeiro (state)) Rio de Janeiro	Barcelona, Catalonia
	Di Stéfano; Duró; Blanquera	Report		Stadium: Camp de Les Corts

3 December 1958 Friendly	Berlin	0–1	Catalonia	Berlin, Germany
				Stadium: Olympiastadion

14 September 1960 Friendly	Lisbon XI	3–3	Catalonia	Lisbon, Portugal
				Stadium: Estadio Jose Alvelade

21 February 1971 Friendly	Basque Country	1–2	Catalonia	Bilbao, Basque Country
	Maranon 50'	http://hemeroteca.mundodeportivo.com/preview/1971/02/22/pagina-6/956193/pdf.html#&mode=fullScreen Report 1 Report 2	De Diego 15', 55'	Stadium: San Mamés; Attendance: 25,000; Referee: Ortiz de Mendibil

29 July 1973 Friendly	Catalonia	1–3	Barcelona	Conca de Barberà
				Stadium: Municipal del Sarral

8 October 2006 Friendly	Catalonia	2–2	Basque Country	Barcelona, Catalonia
18:30	Verdú 67'; Luque 84'	Report1; Report 2	Aduriz 19'; Llorente 64'	Stadium: Camp Nou; Attendance: 56,353; Referee: Vicente Lizondo (Spain)

29 December 2007 Friendly	Basque Country	1–1	Catalonia	Bilbao, Basque Country
20:30	Aduriz 69'	Report1; Report 2	Bojan 29'	Stadium: San Mamés; Attendance: 40,000; Referee: Miguel Ángel Pérez (Spain)

28 December 2014 Centenary Trophy	Basque Country	1–1	Catalonia	Bilbao, Basque Country
20:30	Aduriz 3'	Report 1 Report 2	S. García 44'	Stadium: San Mamés Stadium; Attendance: 40,000; Referee: Iñaki Vicandi Garrido (Spain)

26 December 2015 Centenary Trophy	Catalonia	0–1	Basque Country	Barcelona, Catalonia
20:30		Report 1 Report 2	Aduriz 40'	Stadium: Camp Nou; Attendance: 51,224; Referee: Xavier Estrada Fernández (Spain)

=== Against FIFA national teams ===
==== 20th century ====
20 February 1912 Friendly	France	7–0	Catalonia	Colombes, France
		Report		Stadium: Stade de Colombes

1 December 1912 Friendly	Catalonia	1–0	France	Barcelona, Catalonia
	De la Riva			Stadium: Camp de la Indústria; Referee: Hodge

13 March 1924 Friendly	Catalonia	0–7	Spain	Barcelona, Catalonia
		Report	Zabala; Samitier; Carulla (?); Laca	Stadium: Camp de Les Corts; Referee: Catalonia Josep Llovera

13 December 1925 Friendly	Catalonia	2–1	Czechoslovakia	Barcelona, Catalonia
	Sagibarba (pen.); Samitier	Report	Schaffer (pen.)	Stadium: Sarrià Stadium; Referee: Christophe

7 July 1926 Friendly	Czechoslovakia	2–1	Catalonia	Prague, Czechoslovakia
	Hajný	Report	Samitier	Stadium: Stadion Letná; Referee: Hinler

14 February 1934 Friendly	Catalonia	0–2	Spain	Barcelona, Catalonia
15:45		Report	Casuco 30'; Lángara 60'	Stadium: Camp de Les Corts; Referee: Arribas

17 June 1934 Friendly	Catalonia	2–1	Brazil	Barcelona, Catalonia
17:00	Escolà 20'; Morera 48'	Report	Armandinho 74'	Stadium: Camp de Les Corts; Referee: Comorera

24 June 1934 Friendly	Catalonia	2–2	Brazil	Girona
17:00	Gual 15'; Calvet	Report	Leônidas; Octacílio 75'	Stadium: Vista Alegre; Referee: Santiago

19 October 1947 Friendly	Catalonia	3–1	Spain	Barcelona, Catalonia
16:00	César 11', 30'; Toni 67'	Report	Bilbao 2'	Stadium: Sarrià Stadium; Referee: Azón

9 August 1953 Friendly	Catalonia	0–6	Spain	Barcelona, Catalonia
		Report		Referee: Azón

9 June 1976 Friendly	Catalonia	1–1	Soviet Union	Barcelona, Catalonia
20:45	Neeskens 45'	Report	Maksimenkov 59'	Stadium: Camp Nou; Attendance: 35,000; Referee: López Cuadrado

23 December 1997 Friendly	Catalonia	1–1	Bulgaria	Barcelona, Catalonia
20:45	García 6'	Report	Álvarez 34' (o.g.)	Stadium: Estadi Olímpic Lluís Companys; Attendance: 35,300; Referee: Antoni Llonch (Spain)

22 December 1998 Friendly	Catalonia	5–0	Nigeria	Barcelona, Catalonia
20:30	Óscar 4', 29'; Celades 18'; Tamudo 82'; Barbarà 87'	Report		Stadium: Estadi Olímpic Lluís Companys; Attendance: 53,630; Referee: Xavier Moreno (Spain)

23 December 1999 Friendly	Catalonia	1–0	FR Yugoslavia	Barcelona, Catalonia
20:30	Óscar 45'	Report		Stadium: Estadi Olímpic Lluís Companys; Attendance: 43,700; Referee: Antoni Llonch (Spain)

==== 21st century ====
22 December 2000 Friendly	Catalonia	5–0	Lithuania	Barcelona, Catalonia
21:15	Óscar 10', 83'; Jordi 43'; Gerard 71' (pen.); Xavi 78'	Report		Stadium: Camp Nou; Attendance: 47,000; Referee: Antoni Llonch (Spain)

28 December 2001 Friendly	Catalonia	1–0	Chile	Barcelona, Catalonia
21:00	L. García 56'	Report		Stadium: Camp Nou; Attendance: 60,000; Referee: Jesús Téllez (Spain)

18 May 2002 Friendly	Catalonia	1–3	Brazil	Barcelona, Catalonia
21:00	L. García 63'	Report	Ronaldinho 20', 44'; Edmílson 75'	Stadium: Camp Nou; Attendance: 96,700; Referee: Jesús Téllez (Spain)

28 December 2002 Friendly	Catalonia	2–0	China	Barcelona, Catalonia
21:15	Roger 10'; Luque 48'	Report		Stadium: Camp Nou; Attendance: 63,416; Referee: Xavier Moreno (Spain)

28 December 2003 Friendly	Catalonia	4–2	Ecuador	Barcelona, Catalonia
18:30	S. García 9', 17'; Xavi 26'; L. García 76'	Report	Ordóñez 26'; Espinoza 87'	Stadium: Camp Nou; Attendance: 67,100; Referee: Jesús Téllez (Spain)

25 May 2004 Friendly	Catalonia	2–5	Brazil	Barcelona, Catalonia
21:05	Gerard 75'; S. García 89'	Report	Ronaldo 16', 37'; Oliveira 52'; Baptista 63', 90+1'	Stadium: Camp Nou; Attendance: 83,357; Referee: Xavier Moreno (Spain)

29 December 2004 Friendly	Catalonia	0–3	Argentina	Barcelona, Catalonia
21:30		Report	Scaloni 1'; Rodríguez 52'; Galletti 75'	Stadium: Camp Nou; Attendance: 65,320; Referee: Xavier Moreno (Spain)

28 December 2005 Friendly	Catalonia	1–1	Paraguay	Barcelona, Catalonia
21:30	Soriano 58'	Report	López 69'	Stadium: Camp Nou; Attendance: 33,000; Referee: Alfonso Álvarez (Spain)

24 May 2006 Friendly	Catalonia	2–0	Costa Rica	Terrassa, Catalonia
21:30	Piti 7'; Roger 63'	Report		Stadium: Estadi Olímpic de Terrassa; Attendance: 8,155; Referee: Xavier Moreno (Spain)

24 May 2008 Hybrid friendly	Catalonia	0–1	Argentina U23	Barcelona, Catalonia
19:00		Report	Lavezzi 19'	Stadium: Camp Nou; Attendance: 42,380; Referee: Alfonso Álvarez (Spain)

28 December 2008 Friendly	Catalonia	2–1	Colombia	Barcelona, Catalonia
19:00	Bojan 15'; Verdú 64'	Report	Montero 90+2'	Stadium: Camp Nou; Attendance: 30,000; Referee: Alberto Undiano (Spain)

22 December 2009 Catalonia International Trophy	Catalonia	4–2	Argentina	Barcelona, Catalonia
20:30	S. García 44'; Bojan 56'; Sergio 70' (pen.); Hurtado 76'	Report	Pastore 63'; Di María 72'	Stadium: Camp Nou; Attendance: 53,000; Referee: Alfonso Álvarez (Spain)

28 December 2010 Catalonia International Trophy	Catalonia	4–0	Honduras	Barcelona, Catalonia
19:00	Corominas 26'; S. García 50'; Bojan 60', 71'	Report		Stadium: Estadi Olímpic Lluís Companys; Attendance: 28,150; Referee: Xavier Estrada Fernández (Spain)

30 December 2011 Catalonia International Trophy	Catalonia	0–0	Tunisia	Barcelona, Catalonia
19:00		Report		Stadium: Estadi Olímpic Lluís Companys; Attendance: 36,545; Referee: Alfonso Álvarez (Spain)

2 January 2013 (Note: 2012 Catalonia International Trophy was played on 2 January 2013.) Catalonia International Trophy	Catalonia	1–1	Nigeria	Cornellà de Llobregat, Catalonia
19:00	Sergio 3' (pen.)	Report	Dike 55'	Stadium: Estadi Cornellà-El Prat; Attendance: 27,234; Referee: Xavier Estrada Fernández (Spain)

30 December 2013 Catalonia International Trophy	Catalonia	4–1	Cape Verde	Barcelona, Catalonia
19:00	S. García 17', 18'; Bojan 19'; Riera 64'	Report	Djaniny 10'	Stadium: Estadi Olímpic Lluís Companys; Attendance: 20,700; Referee: Alfonso Álvarez (Spain)

28 December 2016 Catalonia International Trophy	Catalonia	3–3 (2–4 p)	Tunisia	Girona, Catalonia
20:00	Gerard 35'; S. García 69'; Verdú 79'	Report	Msakni 9', 30', 67'	Stadium: Estadi Montilivi; Attendance: 8,311; Referee: Alfonso Álvarez (Spain)
	Penalties
	Verdú (penalty missed); Víctor Álvarez (penalty missed); Vázquez (penalty scored); Riera (penalty scored)		(penalty scored) Sassi; (penalty scored) Dhaouadi; (penalty scored) Bguir; (penalty missed) Azouni; (penalty scored) Khalifa

25 March 2019 Friendly	Catalonia	2–1	Venezuela	Girona, Catalonia
21:00	Bojan 53'; Puado 87'	Report	Rosales 58'	Stadium: Estadi Montilivi; Attendance: 12,671; Referee: Xavier Estrada Fernández (Spain)

25 May 2022 (Note: The Catalonia v Jamaica match, originally scheduled for 30 March 2020 at the Camp d'Esports, Lleida was postponed due to the coronavirus. The match was later rescheduled to 25 May 2022 at the Estadi Montilivi, Girona.) Friendly	Catalonia	6–0	Jamaica	Girona, Catalonia
18:45	Deulofeu 3', 28', 44'; Bartra 35'; Jutglà 74'; Puado 88'	Report		Stadium: Estadi Montilivi; Attendance: 6,124; Referee: Victor Garcia Verdura (Spain)

8 June 2023 Friendly	Catalonia	Cancelled	Mali	Lleida, Catalonia
19:00		Report		Stadium: Camp d'Esports

29 May 2024 Friendly	Catalonia	2–2	Panama	Sabadell, Catalonia
19:00	Jutglà 9'; Aleñá 92'	Report	E. Davis 17'; Gondola 27'	Stadium: Estadi de la Nova Creu Alta; Attendance: 5.859; Referee: Victor Garcia Verdura (Spain)

28 May 2025 Friendly	Catalonia	2–0	Costa Rica	Sant Joan Despí, Catalonia
19:00	A. Roca 71'; Aleñá 89'	Report		Stadium: Johan Cruyff Stadium; Attendance: 5.352; Referee: Victor Garcia Verdura (Spain)

18 November 2025 Friendly	Catalonia	2-1	Palestine	Barcelona, Catalonia
18:30	Ilie 4' Mahajna 27' (o.g.)	Report	Zeidan 30'	Stadium: Lluís Companys Olympic Stadium; Attendance: 30,018; Referee: Víctor Garcia Verdura (Spain)

== Record versus other national teams ==
=== Versus non-FIFA teams ===
As of 26 December 2015

Opponent	Pld	W	D	L	GF	GA	GD	Win %
Andalusia	2	1	0	1	3	5	−2	50.00
Aragon	1	0	0	1	1	3	−2	0.00
Asturias (Note: Includes one match against the Cantabric team comprising Asturias and Cantabria.)	4	3	0	1	7	4	+3	75.00
Barcelona	2	1	0	1	6	6	+0	50.00
Basque Country (Note: Including matches played against the North Federation (with Cantabria) in 1915 and 1916: P6, W0, D2, L4, F4, A17.)	13	1	5	7	12	27	−15	7.69
Berlin	1	1	0	0	1	0	+1	100.00
Biscay	3	3	0	0	6	2	+4	100.00
Brussels	1	1	0	0	9	0	+9	100.00
Budapest	1	1	0	0	3	1	+2	100.00
Castile (Note: Matches against the Central Federation team (Spanish: Equipo de la Centro Federación), including Madrid and the wider Castile region.)	19	10	6	3	48	30	+18	52.63
Gipuzkoa	6	4	1	1	14	9	+5	66.67
Hamburg	1	1	0	0	3	1	+2	100.00
Lisbon	1	0	1	0	3	3	+0	0.00
Paris	3	2	0	1	8	5	+3	66.67
Prague	1	1	0	0	1	0	+1	100.00
Provence	2	2	0	0	5	0	+5	100.00
(Rio de Janeiro (state)) Rio de Janeiro	1	1	0	0	4	1	+3	100.00
(Languedoc) South East France	1	1	0	0	2	1	+1	100.00
(Aquitaine) South West France	2	2	0	0	8	2	+6	100.00
Stuttgart	2	1	1	0	5	4	+1	50.00
Valencian Community	4	2	1	1	8	9	−1	50.00
(Canton of Zurich) Zürich	1	1	0	0	5	2	+3	100.00
Total (22 opponents)	72	40	15	17	162	115	+47	55.56

=== Versus FIFA teams ===
As of 18 November 2025

Opponent	Pld	W	D	L	GF	GA	GD	Win %
Argentina (Note: Including one match against the Argentina Olympic squad in 2008.)	3	1	0	2	4	6	−2	33.33
Brazil	4	1	1	2	7	11	−4	25.00
Bulgaria	1	0	1	0	1	1	+0	0.00
Cape Verde	1	1	0	0	4	1	+3	100.00
Chile	1	1	0	0	1	0	+1	100.00
China	1	1	0	0	2	0	+2	100.00
Colombia	1	1	0	0	2	1	+1	100.00
Costa Rica	2	2	0	0	4	0	+4	100.00
Czechoslovakia	2	1	0	1	3	3	+0	50.00
Ecuador	1	1	0	0	4	2	+2	100.00
FR Yugoslavia	1	1	0	0	1	0	+1	100.00
France	2	1	0	1	1	7	−6	50.00
Honduras	1	1	0	0	4	0	+4	100.00
Jamaica	1	1	0	0	6	0	+6	100.00
Lithuania	1	1	0	0	5	0	+5	100.00
Mali	0	0	0	0	0	0	+0	—
Nigeria	2	1	1	0	6	1	+5	50.00
Palestine	1	1	0	0	2	1	+1	100.00
Panama	1	0	1	0	2	2	+0	0.00
Paraguay	1	0	1	0	1	1	+0	0.00
Soviet Union	1	0	1	0	1	1	+0	0.00
Spain	4	1	0	3	3	16	−13	25.00
Tunisia	2	0	2	0	3	3	+0	0.00
Venezuela	1	1	0	0	2	1	+1	100.00
Total (23 opponents)	36	19	8	9	69	58	+11	52.78

== See also ==
- Catalan Football Federation
- Catalan football championship
- List of Catalan footballers
