= José Julià =

Spanish footballer

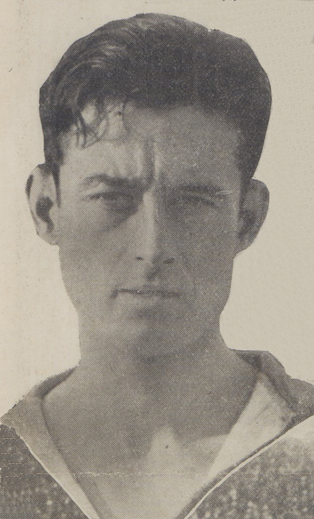
- José Julià

Personal information
- Full name: José Julià Ribas
- Birth name: Josep Julià i Ribas
- Date of birth: 6 October 1895
- Place of birth: Barcelona, Catalonia, Spain
- Date of death: 15 October 1973 (aged 78)
- Place of death: Barcelona, Catalonia, Spain
- Position: Forward

Senior career*
Years	Team	Apps	(Gls)
1911–1913	Català FC		
1913–1918	FC Barcelona		
1916–1917	→ CE Sants (loan)		
1917–1918	→ CF Badalona (loan)		
1918–1919	RCD Espanyol		
1919–1921	FC Barcelona		
1921–1923	CE Europa		
- * Club domestic league appearances and goals

José Julià Ribas (6 October 1895 – 15 October 1973), also known as Bertini, was a Spanish footballer who played as a forward who played for FC Barcelona, Espanyol, and CE Europa.

== Playing career ==
José Julià was born on 6 October 1895 in Barcelona, and he began his footballing career at Català FC in 1911, at the age of 16. There, he stood out as a great forward, so he eventually caught the attention of FC Barcelona, who signed him in 1913, where he mostly played for the second team and had few chances in the first, featuring in only 3 competitive matches between 1913 and 1918, one of which in the 1915–16 Catalan championship, and by simply playing in this match, he was part of the squad that won that title. Such was his insignificance that Barça loaned him in back-to-back seasons in 1917 and 1918, first to CE Sants and then to CF Badalona. In 1918, he moved to RCD Espanyol during the 1918–19 season, playing 8 official games, but then returned to FC Barcelona for two more seasons under Jack Greenwell, winning the Catalan championship in both of them and scoring twice in 9 appearances.

Julià then joined CE Europe in the 1922–23 season, and together with Juan Pellicer, Manuel Cros, and Antonio Alcázar, he helped the club win the 1922–23 Catalan Championship after beating his former club Barcelona 1–0 in a play-off title-decider on 21 March 1923, thanks to a lonely goal from Alcázar. Julià then helped CE Europa reach their first-ever Copa del Rey final in 1923, which they lost 0–1 to Athletic Bilbao, courtesy of a goal from Travieso.

On 10 February 1924, a match against FC Barcelona had to be suspended in the 38th minute when Europa's Julià was sent off and refused to leave the rural area. Julià decided to retire from football out of the blue after being punished with a one-year suspension, and the club was fined 1000 pesetas. This incident resulted in CE Europa making a general assembly in which it was agreed to separate from the Catalan Football Federation. In total, he scored 20 goals in 34 matches with the club, all of which in the Catalan championship.

== Death ==
Julià died in Barcelona on 15 October 1973, at the age of 78.

== Honours ==
FC Barcelona

Catalan championship:

- Champions (3): 1915–16, 1919–20, and 1920–21

CE Europa

Catalan championship:

- Champions (1): 1922–23

Copa del Rey:

- Runner-up (1): 1923
