= Juan Bordoy =

Spanish footballer & manager (1897–1972)

Personal information
- Full name: Juan Bordoy Cañellas
- Birth name: Joan Bordoy i Cañellas
- Date of birth: 17 December 1897
- Place of birth: Lloseta, Balearic Islands, Spain
- Date of death: 12 October 1972 (aged 74)
- Place of death: Barcelona, Catalonia, Spain
- Position: Goalkeeper

Youth career
- 1911–1915: CE Europa

Senior career*
| Years | Team | Apps | (Gls) |
| 1915–1927 | CE Europa | | |

International career
| 1917–1924 | Catalonia | 4 | (0) |
- * Club domestic league appearances and goals

Juan Bordoy Cañellas (17 December 1897 – 12 October 1972) was a Spanish footballer who played as a goalkeeper for CE Europa, and a manager, taking charge of CE Europa between 1929 and 1931.

A historical member of CE Europa in the 1920s, he developed his entire career there, thus being part of the so-called one-club men group.

== Club career ==
Born in Lloseta, Balearic Islands, Bordoy moved to Barcelona at the age of four and always considered himself Catalan. He began playing football at Passeig de Sant Joan before joining the youth ranks of CE Europa in 1911, at the age of 13, and making his debut with the senior team four years later in 1915, where he became the undisputed starting goalkeeper of the Gracian first team until his final retirement in 1927. He started playing as a midfielder, but soon switched to playing as a goalkeeper, given his height and on medical advice. Along with the likes of Mauricio, Manuel Cros, and Alcázar, he was a member of the great CE Europa side of the 1920s that won the Catalan Championship in 1923, keeping a clean-sheet in a 1–0 victory over FC Barcelona in the play-off title-decider, and then reached the 1923 Copa del Rey final, where they were beaten 0–1 by Athletic Bilbao, courtesy of a goal from Travieso.

Bordoy was brave and very forceful in his outings and was only overshadowed by the greats Ricardo Zamora and Ferenc Plattkó. He stayed loyal to the club for over a decade until 1927, when he retired. He even rejected an offer from Madrid FC, explaining that he trained very early in the morning because he had to be at work at 8. In total, he played 122 matches with the club.

Throughout his life, the club paid him several tributes and always considered him a model of fidelity, modesty, sacrifice, and commitment. In 1924, Bordoy was the subject of a tribute match between Europe and UE Sants, with the former winning 8–1. In 1928, a second tribute match was played where Europe defeated a selection of players (combinado) 5–4.

== International career ==
As a CE Europa player, Bordoy was eligible to play for the Catalan national team, playing 3 matches, making his debut on 17 May 1917 in a friendly match against FC Barcelona, which ended in a 1–1 draw. His second and third caps were both against FC Barcelona, the first on 25 May 1919, shortly after the cup final that Barça lost; Catalonia lost 0–1; and then on 4 September 1921 in a match to benefit the victims of the war in Morocco, which ended in a 0–3 loss. He played his last match for Catalonia against RCD Espanyol at the Sarrià Stadium in a tribute to Raúl de Loredo Juárez on 16 March 1924, which ended in a 5–4 win.

== Managerial career ==
After his career as a player ended, Bordoy remained linked to CE Europa, now as a coach, first with the reserve teams, and then, with the first team in the 1929–30 and 1930–31 seasons, in the newly founded La Liga, with the latter ending in relegation to the Segunda División. In the 1950s he coached the youth teams.

== Personal life and death ==
In the 1970s, a first cousin of his, Margalida Miranda, was part of the board of directors of one of the most important clubs in the city, the CD Atlético Baleares and president of the community of owners of the Estadio Balear, the playing field of Atlético.

Bordoy died in Barcelona on 12 October 1972, at the age of 74.

== Honours ==
CE Europa

- Catalan football championship: 1922–23
- Copa del Rey runner-up: 1923
