= Bordoy =

Bordoy is a Spanish surname. Notable people with the surname include:

- Andrés Bordoy (born 1982), Argentine rugby union coach and former international player
- Anders Bordoy (born 2004), American soccer player
- Juan Bordoy (1897–1972), Spanish footballer
- Margarita Miranda Bordoy (1919–1979), Spanish sporting director
