= Cruella =

Cruella can refer to:

- Cruella de Vil, a character in the 101 Dalmatians novel, three films, and animated series
- Cruella (film), a live-action crime film based on the Disney animated character
- Cruella (soundtrack), the soundtrack album to the film of the same name
- Cruella, a fetish magazine
- Krewella, an American electronic dance music group

== People ==
- Agustín Cruella (1897–1968), Spanish footballer
