= 1923 Copa del Rey =

1923 King Alfonso XIII's Cup
23rd Copa del Rey

Tournament details
- Country: Spain
- Teams: 8

Final positions
- Champions: Athletic Bilbao (9th title)
- Runners-up: Europa

Tournament statistics
- Matches played: 15
- Goals scored: 46 (3.07 per match)
- Top goal scorer: Manuel Cros (4 goals)

The King Alfonso XIII's Cup 1923 was the 23rd staging of the Copa del Rey, the Spanish football cup competition.

The competition started on 25 March 1923, and concluded on 13 May 1923, with the final, held at the Les Corts in Barcelona, in which Athletic Bilbao lifted the trophy for the ninth time with a 1–0 victory over CD Europa with Travieso netting the only goal of the match.

== Teams ==
- Biscay Region: Athletic Bilbao
- Gipuzkoa Region: Real Sociedad
- Centre Region: Real Madrid
- South Region: Sevilla FC
- Galicia Region: Real Vigo
- Asturias Region: Sporting de Gijón
- Catalonia Region: CE Europa
- Levante Region: Valencia FC

== Quarterfinals ==
Team 1	Agg.	Team 2	1st leg	2nd leg
Real Madrid	1–8	Athletic Bilbao	1–3	0–5
Real Vigo Sporting	3–4	Real Sociedad	3–1	0–3
Valencia FC	2–6	Sporting Gijón	1–0	1–6
CD Europa	6–1	Sevilla FC	4–0	2–1

- Tiebreaker (because of equality of points - 1 win each)

Team 1	Score	Team 2
Sporting Gijón	2–0	Valencia FC
Real Sociedad	4–1	Real Vigo Sporting

=== First leg ===
25 March 1923

Real Madrid	1–3	Athletic Bilbao
Bernabéu 20'	Report	Sesúmaga 19' (pen.), 28' (pen.), 51'

Madrid
Referee: (Spain) Manuel Lemmel
25 March 1923

Real Vigo Sporting	3–1	Real Sociedad
Ramón 20'; Gerardito 37'; Moncho Gil 50'	Report	Juantegui 17'

Campo de Coia, Vigo
Referee: (Spain) Orbón
25 March 1923

Valencia FC	1–0	Sporting Gijón
Montes 87'	Report

Campo de Algirós, Valencia
Referee: (France) Lucien Leclercq
25 March 1923

CD Europa	4–0	Sevilla FC
Julià 50', 80'; Cros 70', 75'	Report

Referee: (Spain) Rasero Arribillaga

=== Second leg ===
8 April 1923

Athletic Bilbao	5–0	Real Madrid
Travieso 16', 88'; Laca 62', 87'; Larraza 71'	Report

San Mamés Stadium, Bilbao
Referee: (Spain) Josep Llovera

Athletic de Bilbao qualified for the semifinals 8–1 on agg.

8 April 1923

Sporting Gijón	6–1	Valencia FC
Infiesta 26' (pen.), 87' (pen.); Arcadio 28'; Bolado 67'; Morilla 80'; Corsino 83'	Report	Montes 16'

El Molinón, Gijón
Referee: (Spain) Julián Echevarrieta
8 April 1923

Sevilla FC	1–2	CD Europa
Kinké 60'	Report	Cros 8'; Pelaó 70'

Campo de la Reina Victoria, Sevilla
Referee: (Spain) Rasero Arribillaga

CD Europa qualified for the semifinals 6–1 on agg.

13 April 1923

Real Sociedad	3–0	Real Vigo
Olaizola 18', 76' (pen.); Artola 50'	Report

Atotxa Stadium, San Sebastián
Referee: (Spain) Antonio de Cárcer

=== Tie break ===
11 April 1923

Sporting Gijón	2–0	Valencia FC
Bolado 4'; Palacios 17'	Report

Teatinos, Oviedo
Referee: (Spain) Julián Echevarrieta
15 April 1923

Real Sociedad	4–1	Real Vigo Sporting
Juantegui 13'; Rosales 65'; Olaizola 83'; Artola 88'	Report	Ramón 56'

Josaleta Stadium, Getxo
Referee: (Spain) Enrique Peris

== Semifinals ==
Team 1	Agg.	Team 2	1st leg	2nd leg
Real Sociedad	0–2	Athletic Bilbao	0–0	0–2
CD Europa	5–3	Sporting Gijón	3–2	2–1

=== First leg ===
22 April 1923

Real Sociedad	0–0	Athletic Bilbao
	Report

Josaleta Stadium, Getxo
Referee: (Spain) Ezequiel Montero
22 April 1923

CD Europa	3–2	Sporting Gijón
Pellicer 20'; Olivella 40'; Cros 78'	Report	Morilla 57'; Palacios 85'

Camp de la Indústria, Barcelona
Referee: (Spain) Rasero Arribillaga

=== Second leg ===
29 April 1923

Athletic Bilbao	2–0	Real Sociedad
Echevarría 7'; Carmelo 45+1'	Report

San Mamés Stadium, Bilbao
Referee: (Spain) Manuel Lemmel

Athletic Bilbao qualified for the semifinals 2–0 on agg.

29 April 1923

Sporting Gijón	1–2	CD Europa
Palacios 10'	Report	Pellicer 12'; Julià 88'

El Molinón, Gijón
Referee: (Spain) José Murguía

CD Europa qualified for the semifinals 5–3 on agg.

== Final ==
13 May 1923

Athletic Bilbao	1 – 0	CD Europa
Travieso 29'	Report

Les Corts, Barcelona
Attendance: 30,000
Referee: Rasero Arribillaga

Copa del Rey 1923 winners
Athletic Bilbao
9th title
