= Juan Pellicer =

Spanish footballer (1901–1956)

Personal information
- Full name: Juan Pellicer Palau
- Date of birth: 21 February 1901
- Place of birth: Barcelona, Catalonia, Spain
- Date of death: 29 January 1956 (aged 54)
- Place of death: Barcelona, Catalonia, Spain
- Position: Right winger

Youth career
- 1917–1919: FC Martinenc

Senior career*
Years	Team	Apps	(Gls)
1919–1920	FC Martinenc		
1920–1930	CE Europa		
1928	→ FC Barcelona (on loan)		
1930–1931	UE Sant Andreu		
1931–1932	FC Martinenc		

International career
1917–1925	Catalonia	8	(1)
Medal record
Catalonia
Prince of Asturias Cup
Gold medal – first place	1923–24 Prince of Asturias Cup	Team
Gold medal – first place	1926 Prince of Asturias Cup	Team
- * Club domestic league appearances and goals

Juan Pellicer Palau (21 February 1901 – 29 January 1956) was a Spanish footballer who played as a right winger for CE Europa.

== Club career ==
Born in Catalonia, Pellicer began playing football in the youth ranks of FC Martinenc before being signed by CE Europa in 1920, at the age of 19. Along with the likes of Mauricio, Cros and Alcázar, he was part of the attacking front of the great CE Europa side of the twenties, that won the Catalan Championship in 1923 after beating Barcelona 1–0 in a play-off title-decider, and reached the 1923 Copa del Rey final, where they were beaten 0–1 by Athletic Bilbao, courtesy of a goal from Travieso. He stayed loyal to the club for a decade until 1930, when he left. In total, he scored 18 goals in 140 matches with the club, including 4 goals in 16 matches in La Liga.

On 25 and 26 December 1928, Pellicer played two friendly matches for FC Barcelona against Hungarian club Ferencvárosi TC, which ended in a 4–0 win and a 3–3 draw respectively. In 1930 he signed for UE Sant Andreu and in 1931 he returned to his boyhood club FC Martinenc, where he retired at the end of the season. In 1931 he was the subject of a tribute match by his former club, Europa.

== International career ==
As a CE Europa player, Pellicer was eligible to play for the Catalan national team, scoring 1 goal in 8 games between 1917 and 1925. However, records from the era do not always include accurate statistics and he may have played and scored more. Together with Paulino Alcántara, Josep Samitier and Ricardo Zamora, he was part of the great Catalonia side of the twenties that won two Prince of Asturias Cups, an inter-regional competition organized by the RFEF. In the 1923–24 edition, Pellicer scored the winning goal in the quarter-finals against Gipuzkoa, and in the 1926 edition, he netted a goal in the second leg of the final against Asturias to help Catalonia to a 4–3 win.

== Later life ==
Once retired, Pellicer worked as a director of CE Europa in the late 1940s and as technical secretary of CE Europa from 1953 until his death three years later on 29 January 1956, at the age of 54.

== Honours ==
=== Club ===
CE Europa

Catalan football championship:

- Champions (1): 1922–23

Copa del Rey:

- Runner-up (1): 1923

=== International ===
Catalonia

Prince of Asturias Cup:

- Champions (2): 1923–24 and 1926
