= Antonio Alcázar =

Spanish footballer

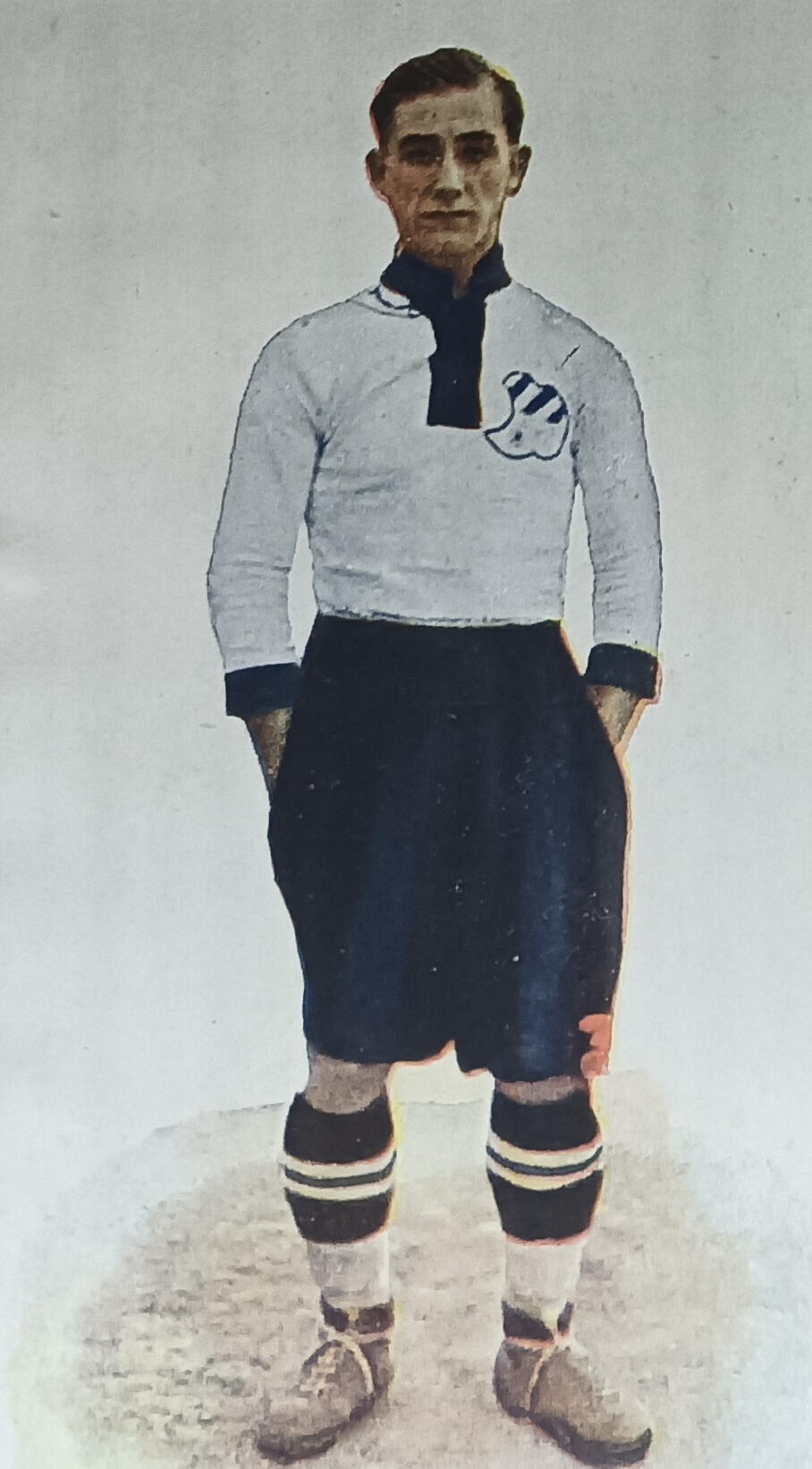
- Photograph of 4 stickers of CE Europa players Manuel Cros i Grau, Josep Julià i Ribas, Antoni Alcázar i Alonso and Joan Olivella, taken at the Exhibition “PIONERS, 125 years of Catalan football”, Catalan Football Federation, 2025

Personal information
- Full name: Antonio Alcázar Alonso
- Date of birth: 2 May 1902
- Place of birth: Torreagüera, Murcia, Spain
- Date of death: 6 December 1966 (aged 64)
- Place of death: Barcelona, Catalonia, Spain
- Position: Left winger

Youth career
- 1912–1917: Neptuno de Gràcia
- 1917–1919: CE Europa

Senior career*
Years	Team	Apps	(Gls)
1919–1932	CE Europa		

International career
1921–27	Catalonia	7	(0)
1925	Spain	2	(0)
- * Club domestic league appearances and goals

Antonio Alcázar Alonso (2 May 1902 – 6 December 1966) was a Spanish footballer who played as a left winger. He was the first footballer born in Murcia to have played for the Spain national team, to have played in a Copa del Rey final, and also the first Murcian to score a goal in La Liga.

== Early life ==
Born in Murcia, Alcázar was barely a year old when his parents moved to Barcelona. He started playing football as a child with his friends in a square in Barrio de Gracia, which was very close to the first football field where CE Europa played its matches.

== Club career ==
=== Early career ===
When he was barely over ten years old, Alcázar joined a modest neighborhood team called Neptuno de Gràcia, where he played as a goalkeeper. His virtues did not go unnoticed by the scouts of the time, and therefore, he was already competing against the best teams in Catalonia in 1919, at the age of 17.

Alcázar joined the ranks of the CE Europa youth team in 1917, and there he slowly progressed and rose through the ranks until he reached the first team in which he defined his position as a left winger. At first, he only played friendly matches, but his great quality, along with his speed, led him to be lined up in the starting team in the 1918–19 season, when he had not yet turned 17 years old. In his first season with the first team, Alcázar helped the club achieve its greatest success thus far, promotion to the highest category of the Catalan regional championship.

=== Golden age of CE Europa ===
Alcázar spent all of his career with CE Europa, a team from Catalonia, which in the 1920s competed against the first golden generation of FC Barcelona for the supremacy of Catalan football, and in fact, CE Europa finished as runner-up in 1921 and 1922, both times behind Barça, before finishing tied on 17 points in the 1922–23 Catalan Championship, which meant that the title had to be decided in a playoff match that was held on 21 March 1923 at the Girona stadium, and Alcázar netted the only goal of the match. Together with Mauricio, Pellicer and Cros, he formed the great attacking front of the CE Europa side that won the Catalan Championship in 1923 and then reached the 1923 Copa del Rey final, where they were beaten by Athletic Bilbao 0–1, courtesy of a goal from Travieso. According to the chronicles, Europa had more chances than its rival, but had no luck in front of goal, with the big star of the game being Athlétic's goalkeeper Manuel Vidal, who several years later would sign for Alcázar's hometown club Real Murcia.

Throughout the rest of the 1920s, Europa CE remained toe-to-toe with FC Barcelona in the fight for the Catalan championship, finished as runners-up again in 1923–24, 1926–27, 1927–28 and 1928–29, but in the 1926–27 season, the Royal Spanish Football Federation decided that the regional runners-up would also compete in the Copa del Rey, so Europa, as runner-up in Catalonia, made its second participation in this competition, where they faced Real Madrid in the quarterfinals, with Alcázar scoring once in the second leg to help his side to a 4–1 win in an eventual playoff elimination in Zaragoza. On 26 December 1928, Alcázar played a friendly match for FC Barcelona against Hungarian club Ferencvárosi TC, which ended in a 3–3 draw.

=== Later career ===
Alcázar was part of the CE Europa side that participated in the first-ever edition of the Spanish League in 1929, scoring three goals in the six games he played that season, with an injury being the cause behind his low playing time. On 31 March 1929, he became the first footballer born in Murcia to score a goal in the Spanish league when he netted once against Atlético Madrid in a 4–1 victory. In the following season, Alcázar played 11 games and scored two goals, both against Real Sociedad.

In the summer of 1930, the president of CE Europa Joan Matas decided that his team would tour northern Europe in order to raise funds to face the third consecutive season in the First Division, and Alcázara was a member of this expedition that played 16 matches in countries such as Norway, Denmark, Sweden, Estonia, and Poland. In his last season with the club in 1930–31, Alcázar played eight games and scored two goals, the last of them on 25 December 1930 against Real Madrid. In January 1931 he suffered a new knee injury that kept him off the playing field until the summer and as a result CE Europa was relegated to the Segunda Division, which caused a serious economic crisis that culminated in a merger with Gràcia FC, formerly known as FC Espanya de Barcelona. In total, he scored 51 goals in 177 matches with the club, including 7 goals in 25 matches in La Liga.

Once the season ended, he left Europa and signed for Iluro Sport Club, a team in which he played during the 1931–32 season. During the summer of 1931 he offered himself to Real Murcia to play for them in the following campaign, but the Grana club and the player did not reach an agreement.

== International career ==
As a CE Europa player, Alcázar was eligible to play for the Catalan national team, making his debut on 6 February 1921, when he was not yet 19 years old, in a match against Southwestern France that ended with a 5–1 Catalan victory. During this year, he played four games with Catalonia, winning three and losing once. In total, he earned seven caps, but failed to score a single goal. On 6 June 1931, Alcázar was the subject of a tribute match between CE Europa and the Catalan national team, ending with a 3–2 victory to the latter.

Alcázar also earned two caps for the Spain national team, which made him the first footballer born in Murcia to reach the national team as well as the first footballer from CE Europa. He made his debut on 1 June 1925 against Switzerland, helping his side to a 3–0 win, and in his second and last cap for Spain two weeks later, on 14 June, he contributed to a 1–0 victory over Italy at the Mestalla Stadium in Valencia.

In the summer of 1925, the then coach of Spain Fernando Gutiérrez Alzaga was relieved of his position and replaced by a triumvirate formed by Ricardo Cabot, José María Mateos, and Manuel de Castro, who decided not to summon Alcázar. He never again played for Spain despite the fact that in the two matches he had played, he had put in good performances and Spain had won. The Catalan journalist Juan Fontanet wrote an article about his surprise at this decision: "Why is Alcázar being dispensed? Why is it that we do not have or do not want to have the excellent player who gave such an incontestable demonstration of his worth in the matches against Switzerland in Bern and against Italy in Valencia? Alcázar did not fail, on the contrary, he showed the qualities of a highly dangerous player, especially with the modification of the offside rule, which allows him for his sprint, perhaps unsurpassed today, and for the power of his shoot, undoubtedly the most powerful of those who play on the outside left, go inside and score points that others can't even try".

== Death ==
Alcázar died at home in Barcelona on 6 December 1966, at the age of, from a slow and painful bone cancer that "first took his patience, then his good humor and finally his life".

== Honours ==
CE Europa

Catalan football championship:

- Champions (1): 1922–23

Copa del Rey:

- Runner-up (1): 1923
