= Juan Olivella =

Spanish footballer

Joan Olivella
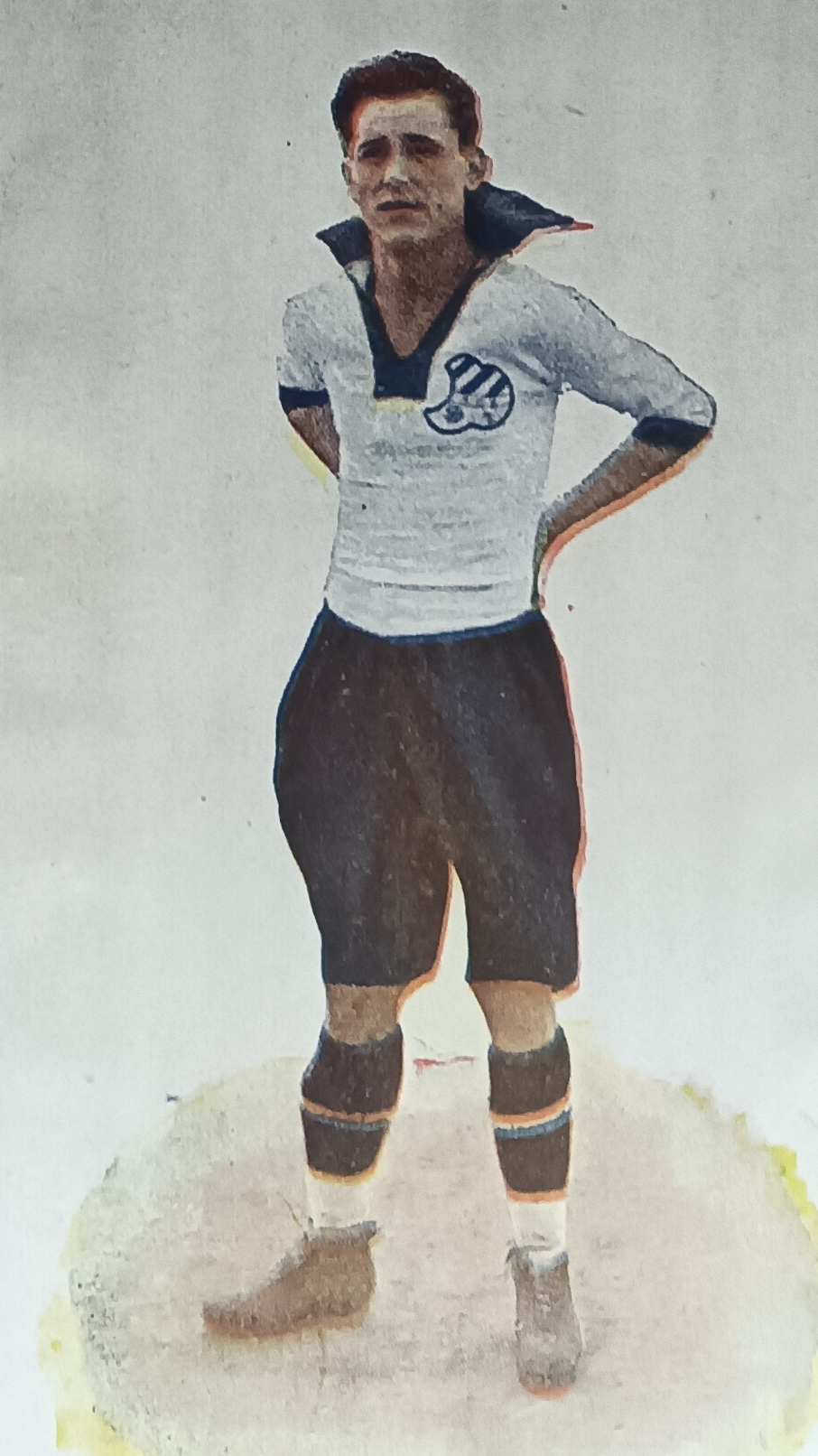

Personal information
- Full name: Juan Olivella
- Date of birth: Unknown
- Place of birth: Catalonia, Spain
- Date of death: Unknown
- Position: Center-forward

Senior career*
Years	Team	Apps	(Gls)
1917-1920	FC Internacional		
1920–1926	CE Europa		
1926-1927	FC Barcelona		
1927–1928	UE Sants		

International career
1918-1927	Catalonia	4	(+1)
Medal record
Catalonia
Prince of Asturias Cup
Gold medal – first place	1923–24 Prince of Asturias Cup	Team
- * Club domestic league appearances and goals

Juan Olivella was a Spanish footballer who played as a forward. The dates of his birth and death are unknown.

== Club career ==
Born in Catalonia, he began playing football at FC Internacional in 1917, before joining CE Europa in 1920. As a member of this club, Olivella won the Catalan Championship in 1923 after beating Barcelona 1–0 in a play-off title-decider, and started in the 1923 Copa del Rey Final, where they were beaten 0–1 by Athletic Bilbao, courtesy of a goal from Travieso. He joined FC Barcelona in the 1926–27 season, but in March 1927 he moved to UE Sants, where he ended his career in the 1927–28 season.

== International career ==
He represented the Catalonia national team several times, being part of the team that won the 1923–24 Prince of Asturias Cup. Olivella scored the opening goal in the quarter-finals against Gipuzkoa on 25 November 1923, in an eventual 2–1 win, although some sources state that he was the author of both goals.

== Honours ==
=== Club ===
CE Europa

Catalan football championship:

- Champions (1): 1922–23

Copa del Rey:

- Runner-up (1): 1923

=== International ===
Catalonia

Prince of Asturias Cup:

- Champions (1): 1923–24
