= José María Sión =

Spanish footballer and manager

Personal information
- Full name: José María Sión Mortera
- Date of birth: 8 August 1907
- Place of birth: Sama, Asturias, Spain
- Date of death: 25 December 1996 (aged 89)
- Place of death: Sama, Asturias, Spain
- Position: Defender

Senior career*
Years	Team	Apps	(Gls)
1926–1927	CP La Felguera		
1927–1928	Racing de Sama		
1928–1930	Cultural y Deportiva Leonesa		
1930–1934	Real Oviedo		
1934–1935	Racing de Sama		
1935–1936	Sporting de Gijón		
1939–1941	Racing de Sama		

Managerial career
- 1941–1942: Racing Langreano
- 1945–1947: Caudal Deportivo
- * Club domestic league appearances and goals

José María Sión Mortera (8 August 1907 – 25 December 1996) was a Spanish footballer who played as a defender for Real Oviedo and Sporting de Gijón, and later a manager. He was known sportingly as Sión II because his older brother Floro Sión and the younger Luis Sión were also footballers before and after him.

== Club career ==
Born in Sama, Asturias, Sión started his football career in his hometown club CP La Felguera and then Racing de Sama, where he began playing as a defender before being assigned due to military service to León, where he joined the Cultural y Deportiva Leonesa in 1928, coinciding with Floro, his older brother.

Sión was part of the Leonese team that at the creation of the Spanish national league had been placed in group B of the Segunda División, in which, being one of the starting defenders and playing in all the matches, he achieved the title and with it promotion to the second category. He remained in the Leonese team until its relegation in 1930, when he signed for Real Oviedo, then also in the second division, while his brother went to Gijón, so they both went from playing together to being rivals. Sión made his debut with Oviedo on 5 October 1930, and together with Óscar, Isidro Lángara, and Ricardo Gallart, he was a member of the Oviedo squad that won the second division in 1932–33 and was thus promoted to the highest category. The title was sealed against CA Osasuna on 5 March 1933, in which he won a penalty given by the referee José María Steimborn to help his side to a 7–1 win. In total, he played 61 official matches with Oviedo.

Sión stayed loyal to the club for four years, from 1930 to 1934, but after barely not playing in the following year, he decided to return to Racing de Sama. He played a single season with the team, signing the following year for Sporting de Gijón, where he was reunited with his brother Floro. He only played in six league matches since he had only been incorporated to play in the regional championship matches, so he left the team at the end of the season, which finished just one point away from promotion to the top category in the league. When the Spanish Civil War ended in 1939, he signed for Racing de Sama where he coincided this time with his two brothers forming the axis defense of the whole. He spent two seasons with them until he retired in 1941 at the age of 33.

== Managerial career ==
After his career as a player ended, Sión remained linked to Racing de Sama, now known as Racing Langreano, by becoming its coach, which he oversaw for one season. He later coached Caudal Deportivo for two seasons between 1945 and 1947.

== Death ==
Sión died in Sama on 25 December 1996, at the age of 89.

== Honours ==
Cultural y Deportiva Leonesa

- Segunda División
  - Champions (1): 1929

Real Oviedo

- Segunda División
  - Champions (1): 1932–33
