= 2016 Catalonia International Trophy =

Trofeu Catalunya Internacional 2016
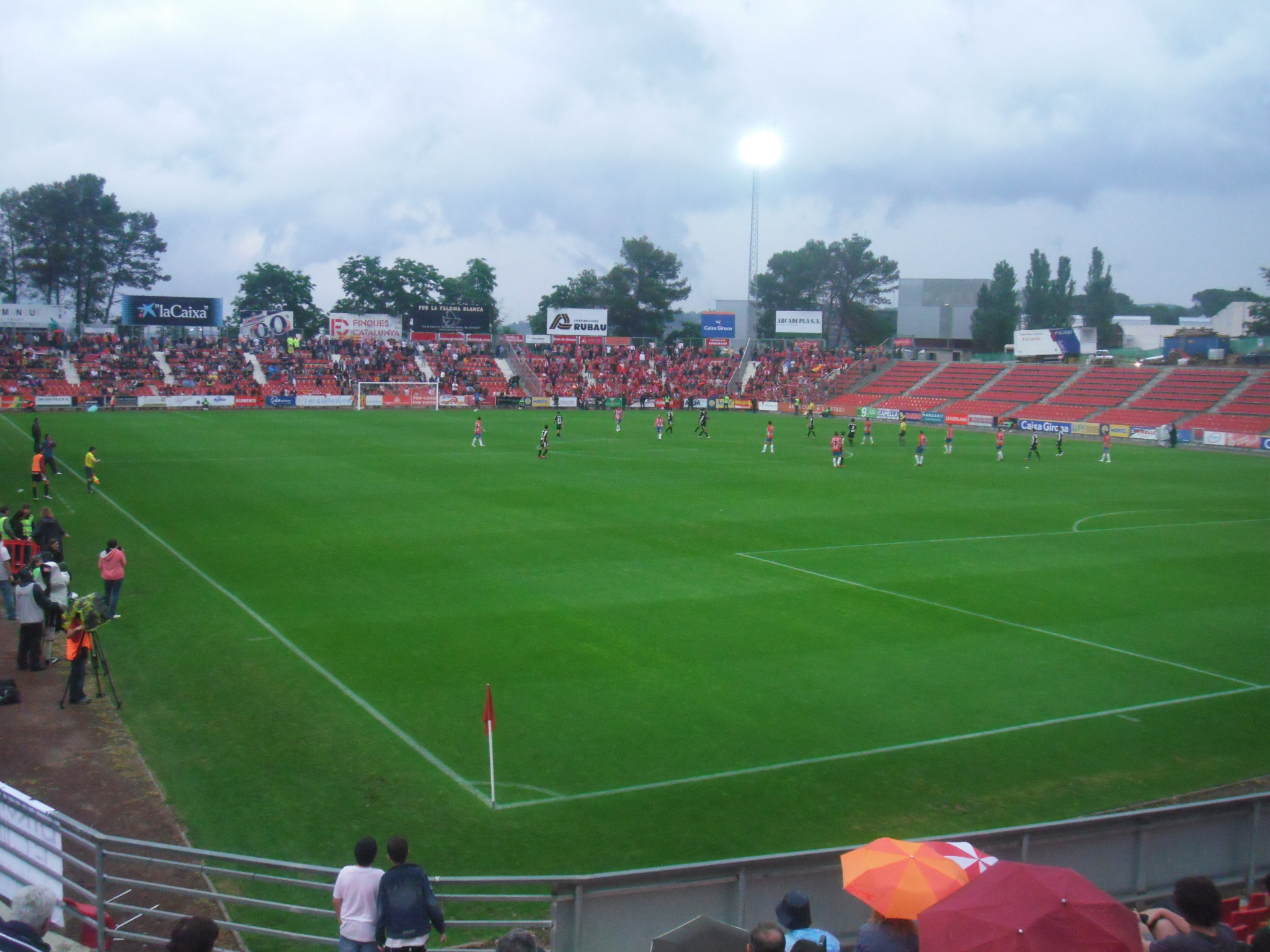
- Estadi Montilivi in Girona hosted the match
- Event: Catalonia International Trophy
Catalonia	Tunisia
3	3
- Tunisia won 4–2 on penalties
- Date: 28 December 2016
- Venue: Estadi Montilivi, Girona, Spain
- Man of the Match: Xavi (Catalonia)
- Referee: Alfonso Álvarez (Spain)
- Attendance: 8,311

The 2016 Catalonia International Trophy is the 6th edition of the Catalonia International Trophy, pitted Catalonia against Tunisia on 28 December 2016 at the Estadi Montilivi in Girona, Catalonia, Spain. Tunisia won the title after winning on penalties.

== Background ==
The two teams previously faced each other once during the 2011 Catalonia International Trophy at the Estadi Olímpic Lluís Companys in Barcelona, Spain. The match ended in a 0−0 draw. Despite the draw, the Catalan team conceded the trophy to Tunisia in a clear display of fair play.

== Match ==
=== Summary ===
In the first half, Tunisia came out much more revolutionized than Catalonia and in a few minutes was ahead on the scoreboard thanks to two goals in twelve minutes by the same player, Youssef Msakni, who bravely made the pair of central players suffer, Andreu Fontàs and Sergi Gómez, and they were anticipated twice to make it 0−2. Catalonia, under the baton of Xavi Hernández, reacted and a step forward resulted in Gerard Moreno's goal, with a strong left-footed shot from the front of the area.

Xavi received ovations when Gerard and Sergio replaced him in the second half for Oriol Riera. Girona footballer Pere Pons, who played the second 45 minutes, has also been highly acclaimed by Montilivi. Another time Msakni, with a pipe from the front unstoppable for Edgar Badia, has put two goals ahead for Tunisia and forced Catalonia to row again against the current.

The selection, however, offered a spectacular final stretch of the match and with a great reaction. He got back into the game with the 2−3, made by Gerard Valentín and signed by Sergio García. The goal gave even more spark to Catalonia, which did not take long to make it 3−3, the work of Verdú after a great cross, also from the right, by Álvaro Vázquez. In the last few minutes, the selection has been looking for the 4−3 insistently but has not found it despite having some very interesting arrivals. He also had the 3−4 Tunisia in the last gasp.

=== Details ===
28 December 2016
20:00 CEST

Catalonia	3–3	Tunisia
Gerard 35'; S. García 69'; Verdú 79'	Report	Msakni 9', 30', 67'
Penalties
Verdú (penalty missed); Víctor Álvarez (penalty missed); Vázquez (penalty scored); Riera (penalty scored)	2–4	(penalty scored) Sassi; (penalty scored) Dhaouadi; (penalty scored) Bguir; (penalty missed) Azouni; (penalty scored) Khalifa

Estadi Montilivi, Girona, Spain
Attendance: 8,311
Referee: Alfonso Álvarez (Spain)

Catalonia	Tunisia

GK	1	Jordi Masip		(substituted off) 45'
DF	6	Pol Lirola		(substituted off) 45'
DF	5	Sergi Gómez		(substituted off) 73'
DF	3	Andreu Fontàs		(substituted off) 46'
DF	14	Aarón Martín		(substituted off) 46'
MF	9	Sergi Roberto		(substituted off) 46'
MF	13	Marc Roca		(substituted off) 46'
MF	7	Xavi (c)		(substituted off) 75'
FW	17	Gerard Moreno		(substituted off) 46'
FW	15	Sergio García	(yellow card) 89'	(substituted off) 46'
FW	11	Víctor Rodríguez		(substituted off) 46'
Substitutions:
GK	16	Edgar Badia		(substituted on) 45'
DF	13	Gerard Valentín		(substituted on) 46'
DF	10	Marc Crosas		(substituted on) 73'
DF	4	Alberto de la Bella		(substituted on) 46'
DF	2	Víctor Álvarez		(substituted on) 46'
MF	14	Pere Pons		(substituted on) 46'
MF	12	Sergi Samper		(substituted on) 46'
MF	8	Joan Verdú		(substituted on) 46'
FW	16	Álvaro Vázquez		(substituted on) 46'
FW	18	Oriol Riera		(substituted on) 75'
Manager:
(Spain) Gerard López (Spain) Sergio González

GK	16	Aymen Mathlouthi (c)		(substituted off) 45'
DF	17	Hamza Mathlouthi		(substituted off) 79'
DF	2	Syam Ben Youssef
DF	4	Zied Boughattas
DF	5	Oussama Haddadi
DF	6	Chamseddine Dhaouadi
MF	8	Hamza Lahmar		(substituted off) 45'
MF	9	Naïm Sliti		(substituted off) 45'
MF	15	Larry Azouni
FW	11	Taha Yassine Khenissi		(substituted off) 45'
FW	7	Youssef Msakni		(substituted off) 72'
Substitutions:
GK	1	Rami Jridi		(substituted on) 45'
DF	13	Hamdi Nagguez		(substituted on) 79'
MF	19	Saad Bguir		(substituted on) 45'
MF	13	Ferjani Sassi		(substituted on) 45'
MF	14	Amine Ben Amor	(yellow card) 89'	(substituted on) 72'
FW	18	Saber Khalifa		(substituted on) 45'
Manager:
(Poland) Henryk Kasperczak
