= Rafael Raich =

Spanish footballer and referee

Personal information
- Place of birth: Catalonia
- Position: Forward

Senior career*
Years	Team	Apps	(Gls)
1915-1917	FC Espanya		

International career
1916	Catalonia	+2	
Medal record
Catalonia
Prince of Asturias Cup
Gold medal – first place	1916 Prince of Asturias Cup	Team
- * Club domestic league appearances and goals

Rafael Raich was a Spanish footballer who played as a forward for FC Espanya and the Catalan national team.

== Biography ==
Born in Catalonia, Raich signed for FC Espanya along with Agustín Cruella Tena in 1915, for whom he won the Catalan championship in 1916–17.

He played several matches for the Catalonia national team during the 1910s, although the exact amount of caps he earned is unknown. He was part of the Catalan side that won the second edition of the Prince of Asturias Cup in 1916, an inter-regional competition organized by the RFEF.

== Honours ==
=== Club ===
FC Espanya

- Catalan championship: 1916-17

=== International ===
Catalonia

- Prince of Asturias Cup: 1916
