= 1923 Copa del Rey final =

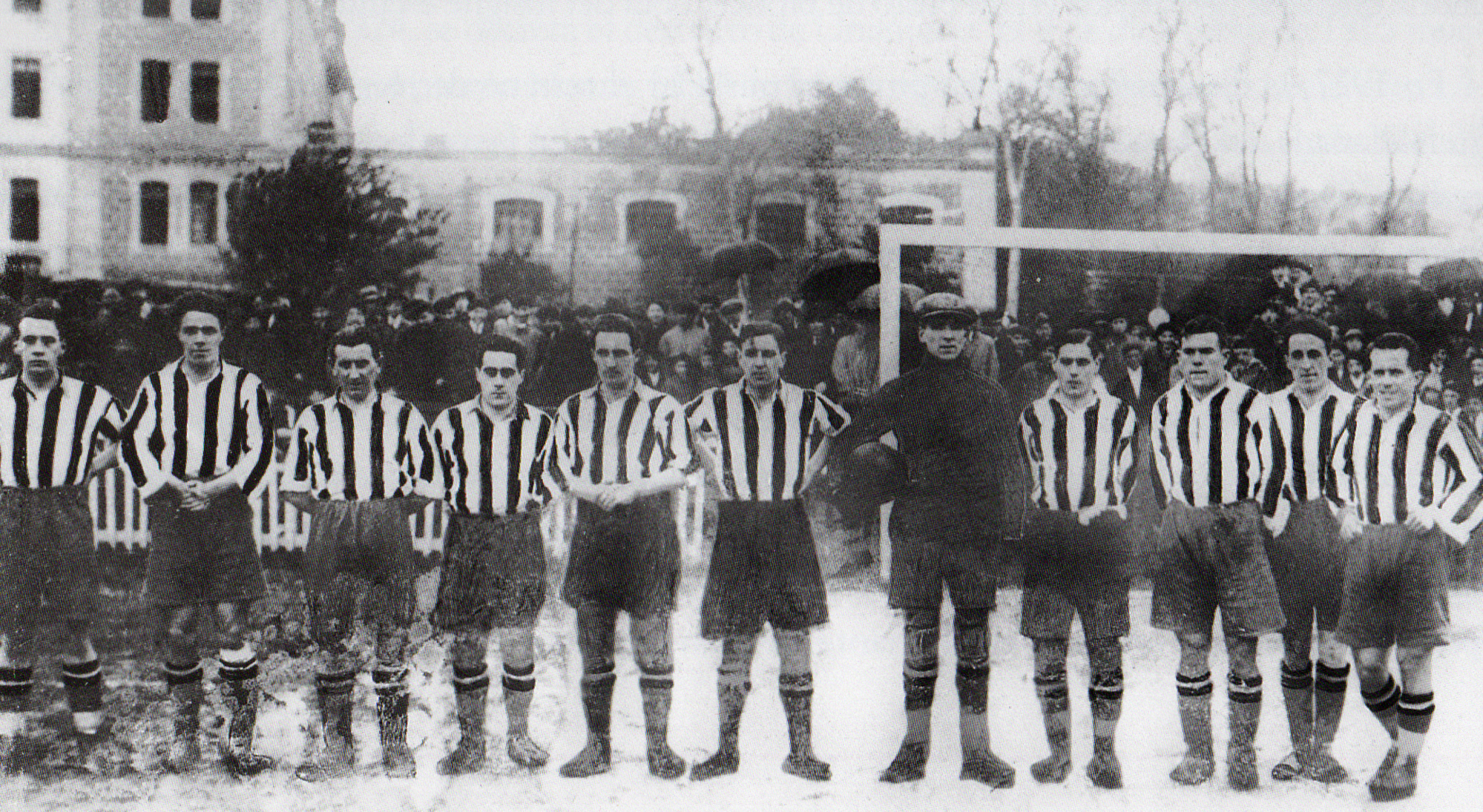
- Athletic Bilbao, champions
- Event: 1923 Copa del Rey
Athletic Bilbao	Europa
1	0
- Date: May 13, 1923
- Venue: Les Corts, Barcelona
- Referee: Rasero
- Attendance: 30,000

The 1923 Copa del Rey final was the 23rd final of the Spanish cup competition, the Copa del Rey. The final was played at Les Corts, in Barcelona, on 13 May 1923. Athletic Bilbao beat Europa 1–0 and won their ninth title. The lonely goal was scored by Travieso.

== Match details ==
13 May 1923
16:30 CET

Athletic Bilbao	1–0	CD Europa
Travieso 29'

Les Corts, Barcelona
Attendance: 30,000
Referee: Rasero

Athletic Bilbao	CD Europa

GK	1	(Spain) Manuel Vidal
DF	2	(Spain) Alberto Duñabeitia
DF	3	(Spain) Domingo Acedo
MF	4	(Spain) Sabino Bilbao
MF	5	(Spain) Jesús Larraza
MF	6	(Spain) José Legarreta
FW	7	(Spain) Germán Echevarría
FW	8	(Spain) Félix Sesúmaga
FW	9	(Spain) Travieso
FW	10	(Spain) Carmelo
FW	11	(Spain) Chirri I
Manager:
(England) Fred Pentland

GK	1	(Spain) Juan Bordoy
DF	2	(Spain) Pedro Serra
DF	3	(Spain) Camilo Vidal
MF	4	(Spain) Javier Bonet
MF	5	(Spain) Estebán Pelaó
MF	6	(Spain) Francisco Artisús
FW	7	(Spain) Juan Pellicer
FW	8	(Spain) José Julià
FW	9	(Spain) Manuel Cros
FW	10	(Spain) Juan Olivella
FW	11	(Spain) Antonio Alcázar
Manager:
(England) Conyers Kirby

Copa del Rey 1923 winners
Athletic Bilbao
9th title
