= Catalonia International Trophy =

- Organiser(s): Catalan Football Federation
- Founded: 2009; 17 years ago
- Abolished: 2016; 10 years ago
- Region: International (played in Catalonia)
- Teams: 2
- Last champions: Tunisia (2016, 2nd title)
- Most championships: Catalonia (3 titles)

The Catalonia International Trophy (Catalan: Trofeu Catalunya Internacional) was an association football friendly tournament organised in Spain by the Catalan Football Federation and which the Catalonia national team plays against another national team. It was created in 2009 and is held annually at the end of December.

== History ==
Since 1997, the Catalan national team has played an international friendly match nearly every year, coinciding with the Christmas holidays. In 2009, in the context of Catalan aspirations to participate in official FIFA or UEFA competitions, the president of the Catalan Football Federation, Jordi Casals, announced the conversion of friendlies into an annual tournament, named the Catalonia International Trophy. The artist Joan Mora donated a sculpture symbolising the four bars of the Catalan flag as a prize for the winner.

On 22 December 2009, the first edition, Johan Cruyff's Catalonia won 4–2 against Diego Maradona's Argentina. After that, four more games were held against Honduras, Tunisia twice, Nigeria and Cape Verde.

== Results ==
=== Editions ===
Ed.	Year	(gold) Champion	Score	(silver) Runner-up	Venue	Attendance
1	2009	Catalonia	4–2	Argentina	Camp Nou, Barcelona	53,000
2	2010	Catalonia	4–0	Honduras	Estadi Olímpic Lluís Companys, Barcelona	28,150
3	2011	Tunisia	0–0	Catalonia	Estadi Olímpic Lluís Companys, Barcelona	36,545
4	2012	Nigeria	1–1	Catalonia	Estadi Cornellà-El Prat, Cornellà de Llobregat	27,234
5	2013	Catalonia	4–1	Cape Verde	Estadi Olímpic Lluís Companys, Barcelona	20,700
6	2016	Tunisia	3–3 (4–2 p)	Catalonia	Estadi Montilivi, Girona	8,311

Notes

1. 2012 Catalonia International Trophy was played on 2 January 2013.
2. Match drawn and trophy awarded to visiting team on fair play basis.

=== Details ===
22 December 2009 First edition	Catalonia	4–2	Argentina	Barcelona, Catalonia, Spain
20:30	S. García 44'; Bojan 56'; Sergio 70' (pen.); Hurtado 76'	Report	Pastore 63'; Di María 72'	Stadium: Camp Nou; Attendance: 53,000; Referee: Alfonso Álvarez (Spain)

28 December 2010 Second edition	Catalonia	4–0	Honduras	Barcelona, Catalonia, Spain
19:00	Corominas 26'; S. García 50'; Bojan 60', 71'	Report		Stadium: Estadi Olímpic Lluís Companys; Attendance: 28,150; Referee: Xavier Estrada Fernández (Spain)

30 December 2011 Third edition	Catalonia	0–0	Tunisia	Barcelona, Catalonia, Spain
19:00		Report		Stadium: Estadi Olímpic Lluís Companys; Attendance: 36,545; Referee: Alfonso Álvarez (Spain)

2 January 2013 Fourth edition	Catalonia	1–1	Nigeria	Cornellà de Llobregat, Catalonia, Spain
19:00	Sergio 3' (pen.)	Report	Dike 55'	Stadium: Estadi Cornellà-El Prat; Attendance: 27,234; Referee: Xavier Estrada Fernández (Spain)

30 December 2013 Fifth edition	Catalonia	4–1	Cape Verde	Barcelona, Catalonia, Spain
19:00	S. García 17', 18'; Bojan 19'; Riera 64'	Report	Djaniny 10'	Stadium: Estadi Olímpic Lluís Companys; Attendance: 20,700; Referee: Alfonso Álvarez (Spain)

28 December 2016 Sixth edition	Catalonia	3–3 (2–4 p)	Tunisia	Girona, Catalonia, Spain
20:00	Gerard 35'; S. García 69'; Verdú 79'	Report	Msakni 9', 30', 67'	Stadium: Estadi Montilivi; Attendance: 8,311; Referee: Alfonso Álvarez (Spain)
	Penalties
	Verdú (penalty missed); Víctor Álvarez (penalty missed); Vázquez (penalty scored); Riera (penalty scored)		(penalty scored) Sassi; (penalty scored) Dhaouadi; (penalty scored) Bguir; (penalty missed) Azouni; (penalty scored) Khalifa

== Records and statistics ==
=== Table of winners ===
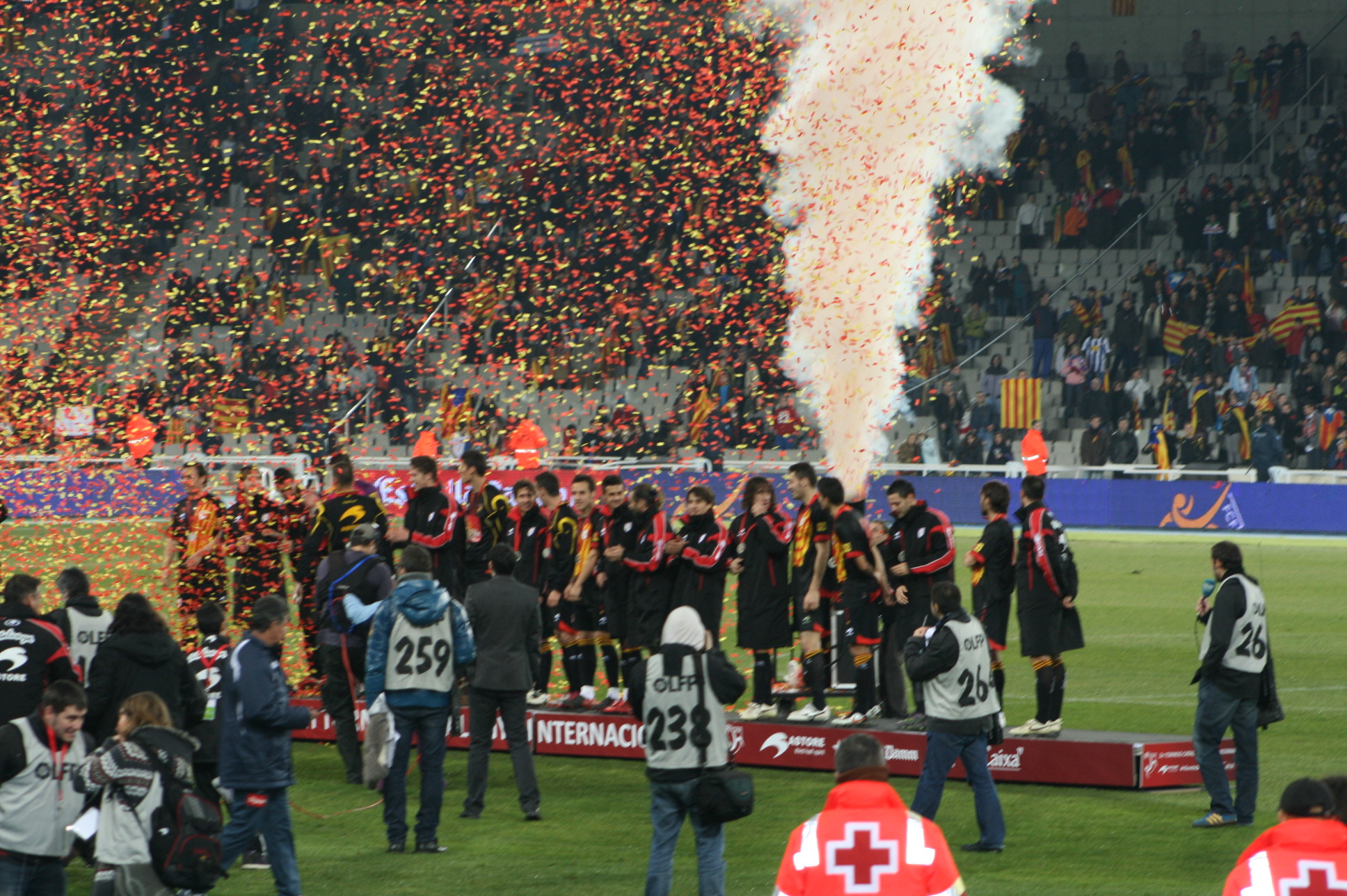
Catalonia receiving the trophy conquered in 2010 against Honduras.

Team	Winner	Runner-up
Catalonia	3 (2009, 2010, 2013)	3 (2011, 2012, 2016)
Tunisia	2 (2011, 2016)	—
Nigeria	1 (2012)	—
Argentina	—	1 (2009)
Honduras	—	1 (2010)
Cape Verde	—	1 (2013)

=== Results summary ===
Pos	Team	P	Pld	W	D	L	GF	GA	GD	Win %
1	Catalonia	6	6	3	3	0	16	11	+5	50.00
2	Tunisia	2	2	1	1	0	3	3	+0	50.00
3	Nigeria	1	1	0	1	0	1	1	+0	0.00
4	Argentina	1	1	0	0	1	2	4	−2	0.00
4	Cape Verde	1	1	0	0	1	1	4	−3	0.00
4	Honduras	1	1	0	0	1	0	4	−4	0.00

=== Top goalscorers ===
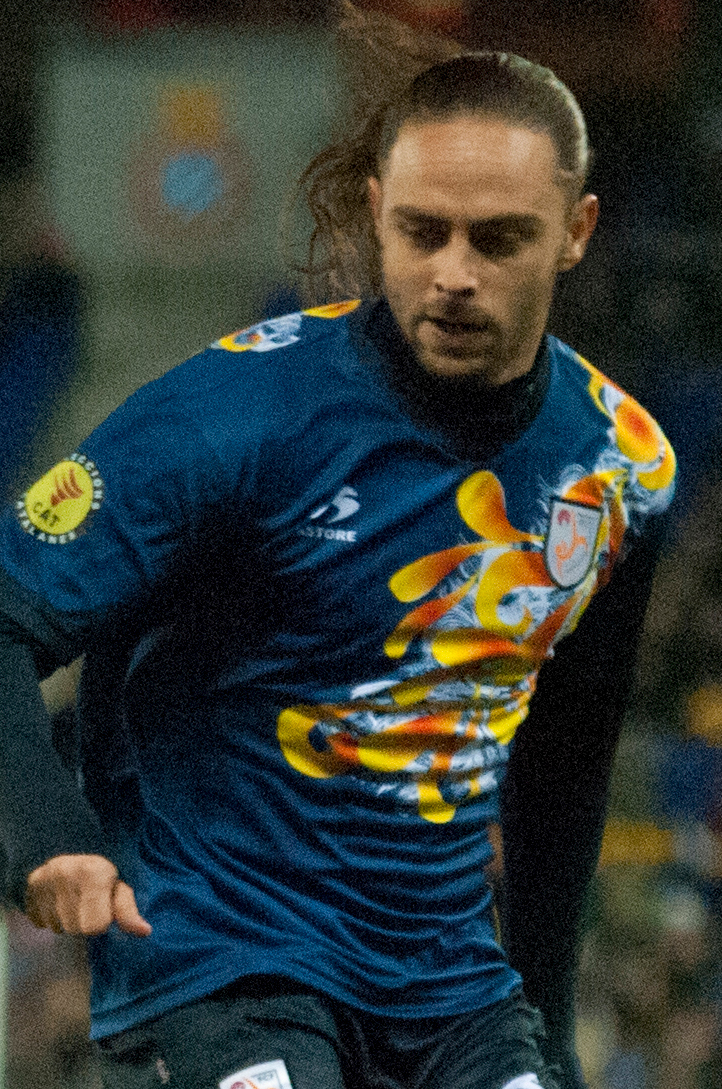
Sergio García is the top scorer in the history of the tournament with 6 goals.

Rank	Player	Team	Goals
1	Sergio García	Catalonia	6
2	Bojan Krkić	Catalonia	4
3	Youssef Msakni	Tunisia	3
4	Sergio González	Catalonia	2
5	Álvaro Vázquez	Catalonia	1
5	Ángel Di María	Argentina	1
5	Bright Dike	Nigeria	1
5	Djaniny	Cape Verde	1
5	Ferran Corominas	Catalonia	1
5	Gerard Moreno	Catalonia	1
5	Javier Pastore	Cape Verde	1
5	Joan Verdú	Catalonia	1
5	Moisés Hurtado	Catalonia	1
5	Oriol Riera	Catalonia	1

== See also ==
- Centenary Trophy
