= Gipuzkoa autonomous football team =

Men's national football team representing Gipuzkoa

Gipuzkoa
- Association: Basque Football Federation

First international
- Biscay 2–1 Gipuzkoa (Bilbao; 13 December 1914); Biscay 1–2 Gipuzkoa (Bilbao; 13 December 1914)

Biggest win
- Gipuzkoa 4–0 Biscay (San Sebastián; 6 January 1915)

Biggest defeat
- Gipuzkoa 0–4 Catalonia (San Sebastián; 26 December 1915)

The Gipuzkoa autonomous football team was the regional football team for the province of Gipuzkoa, Spain, active between the 1910s and the 1930s. They were never affiliated with FIFA or UEFA, because Gipuzkoa is represented internationally by the Spain national football team.

== History ==
=== Early history ===
Gipuzkoa's first recorded game was held at San Mamés on 13 December 1914 against Biscay, and they lost 2–1. Patricio Arabolaza was the scorer of the first goal in the team's history. A month later they faced Biscay again, this time at the Atotxa Stadium, and won comfortably 4–0. Although the Basque provinces of Gipuzkoa and Biscay were both organising their own representative matches occasionally, their players formed a combined 'North' team from the regional championship of that name (which also included Cantabria, but was usually dominated by players from those two Basque provinces), which evolved into the Basque Country team. This Basque/North side participated in the first edition of the Prince of Asturias Cup, an official inter-regional tournament organized by RFEF, at Madrid in 1915 and won the title after beating the Catalan team 1–0 with a goal from Juan Legarreta, then holding Centro (a team formed by players from the centre of Spain) to a 1–1 (the Basque goalscorer being Gipuzkoa's Patricio). Gipuzkoa took on Catalonia four times in friendlies at the end of 1915, with a draw and a narrow loss in Barcelona, followed by a big win (5–1) in San Sebastián and then an equally heavy defeat (4–0) in Irun. In May and June of 1916, "Team North" faced Catalonia three times, winning by 3–1 away and 5–0 at home with a goalless draw in between. Patricio again scored in both victories, netting four times in the latter. The great Pichichi scored his only goal for the team in one the 3–1 win.

After several disagreements between the clubs of Biscay and Gipuzkoa, which had caused there to be no Basque representation under any banner at the next three Prince of Asturias Cup tournaments and culminated in a pivotal North Championship match between Athletic Bilbao (Biscay) and Real Sociedad (Gipuzkoa) being abandoned, in 1918 the National Committee of the Spanish federation agreed to divide the Northern Federation in these two regions. Thus, Gipuzkoa formed its own federation and launched their own championship in the 1918–19 season.

The Gipuzkoa team participated in both the 1922–23 and the 1923–24 editions of the revived Prince of Asturias Cup, being knocked out by Catalonia in the quarter-finals on both occasions. In the latter, they managed to score a goal in a 2–1 loss, their only goal in the competition as a separate entity; the scorer was René Petit.

=== Revival ===
In 2013, a match was staged between the amateur teams of Biscay and Gipuzkoa (which continue to operate provincial football leagues at the sixth level of the pyramid and below) resulting in a 1–1 draw, won by Biscay on penalties, to commemorate the centenary of the Biscay Federation (taking its foundation date as that of the North Federation), as had also taken place in 1964 for the 50th anniversary (6–0 to Biscay).

The centenary of the Gipuzkoa Federation occurred in 2018, but the organisers opted for a conventional friendly between its two biggest clubs – Real Sociedad and SD Eibar – to mark the occasion rather than any match involving representative teams; that was also the case for the 50th anniversary in 1968, when Real Sociedad played twice against Alavés.

=== Results ===
13 December 1914 Friendly	Biscay	2–1	Gipuzkoa	Bilbao, Basque Country
	Barturen; Pagaza	Report	Patricio	Stadium: San Mamés; Referee: Angoso

6 January 1915 Friendly	Gipuzkoa	4–0	Biscay	San Sebastián, Basque Country
				Stadium: Atotxa Stadium

31 October 1915 Friendly	Catalonia	2–1	Gipuzkoa	Barcelona, Catalonia
		Report		Stadium: Camp Muntaner

1 November 1915 Friendly	Catalonia	2–2	Gipuzkoa	Barcelona, Catalonia
	Casellas; Kinké	Report	Sena	Stadium: Camp Muntaner

15 December 1915 Friendly	Gipuzkoa	5–1	Catalonia	San Sebastián, Basque Country
				Stadium: Atotxa Stadium; Referee: Sabata

26 December 1915 Friendly	Gipuzkoa	0–4	Catalonia	Irun, Basque Country
				Stadium: Estadio de Amute; Referee: Martí

19 November 1922 1922–23 Prince of Asturias Cup quarter-finals	Gipuzkoa	0–3	Catalonia	Irun, Basque Country
		Report	Samitier; Gracia; Martí	Stadium: Estadio de Amute; Attendance: 6,000; Referee: (Community of Madrid) Eulogio Aranguren

25 November 1923 1923–24 Prince of Asturias Cup quarter-finals	Catalonia	2–1	Gipuzkoa	Barcelona, Catalonia
	Olivella 22'; Pellicer 29'		Petit 51'	Stadium: Camp de Les Corts; Referee: (Community of Madrid) Ezequiel Montero

17 March 1929 Friendly	Biscay	4–3	Gipuzkoa	Getxo
		Report		Stadium: Ibaiondo; Referee: (Basque Country (autonomous community)) Pelayo Serrano

28 February 1937 Friendly	Biscay	1–2	Gipuzkoa	Bilbao, Basque Country
		Report^{[usurped]}		Stadium: San Mamés

=== Table ===
Opponent	Pld	W	D	L	GF	GA	GD	Win %
Biscay	4	2	0	2	10	7	+3	50.00
Catalonia	6	1	1	4	9	14	−5	16.67
Total (2 opponents)	10	3	1	6	19	21	−2	30.00

== Notable players ==
- (Spain) Patricio Arabolaza
- (Spain) René Petit

== See also ==
- Category:Footballers from Gipuzkoa
