= José María Steimborn =

Spanish football referee (1893–?)

- Full name: José María Steimborn Ludeuvik
- Born: 1893; San Sebastián, Gipuzkoa, Spain
- Died: Unknown

Domestic
Years	League	Role
1924–1941	La Liga	Referee

International
Years	League	Role
1931–1932	FIFA listed	Referee

José María Steimborn Ludeuvik was a Spanish football referee who officiated matches in Spain from 1924 to 1941. He is best known for being the referee of the first-ever El Clásico in La Liga in 1929.

== Biography ==
José María Steimborn was born in 1893 in San Sebastián, and he received his qualification as a referee in the early 1920s, from the newly established National Committee of Referees in Madrid. At first, he was qualified as a Segunda División referee, and from 1929, as a Primera División referee. According to posting practice, he also performed regular coastal judge service. He retired from national refereeing in 1940. In total, he refereed 54 La Liga matches and 46 second-division matches for a total of 100. Throughout his career, he oversaw 10 matches of Valencia CF between 1925 and 1936, 5 at home and 5 away, with a balance of two wins, two draws, and six losses.

Most notably, Steimborn refereed the first-ever El Clásico in La Liga on 17 February 1929, which took place at Les Corts on the second day of the inaugural league season, and ended in a 2–1 win to Real Madrid, the courtesy of a brace from Rafael Morera. In the 53rd minute of this match, when Madrid was 1–0 up, Steimborn awarded the first-ever league penalty kick in favor of FC Barcelona, which Emili Sagi-Barba threw it wide.

On 5 March 1933, Steimborn refereed Oviedo's 7–1 win over CA Osasuna in the second division that sealed Oviedo's promotion, in which he gave a penalty won by José María Sión. In February 1934, in an away match against Racing de Santander, one of Barça's 11 players got injured the night before the game, so the coach Ferenc Plattkó made an urgent call to Barcelona to get a last-minute replacement, the 20-year-old medical student Mario Cabanes, whose train to Santander was delayed. When Cabanes started pacing up and down nervously, a gentleman sat in the same carriage asked him what he was so worried about, and when Cabanes told him he burst out laughing and said: "Do not worry, lad. The game won’t start until I get there. I’m the referee!". On 7 June 1936, Steimborn refereed the first leg of the Spanish Cup semifinals between Real Madrid and Hércules CF, the latter's first-ever semifinal appearance, which ended in a resounding 7–0 loss.

The RFEF presented Steimborn as an international referee on the recommendation of the National Committee of Referees, and the International Football Federation (FIFA) registered him as a referee in 1931, but he retired from international refereeing in the following year in 1932. In doing so, Steimborn became the 12th Spanish international referee, behind the likes of Luis Colina, Pedro Escartín, Ramón Melcón, and Ezequiel Montero.

The date of his death is unknown.
