= Antonio Juantegui =

Spanish footballer

Personal information
- Full name: Antonio Juantegui Eguren
- Date of birth: 4 April 1898
- Place of birth: Zumarraga, Spain
- Date of death: 13 May 1966 (aged 68)
- Place of death: San Sebastián, Spain

International career
Years	Team	Apps	(Gls)
1924	Spain	1	(1)

Antonio Juantegui (4 April 1898 – 13 May 1966) was a Spanish footballer. He played in one match for the Spain national football team in 1924.
