= Vicente Palacios (footballer) =

Spanish footballer (1900–1936)

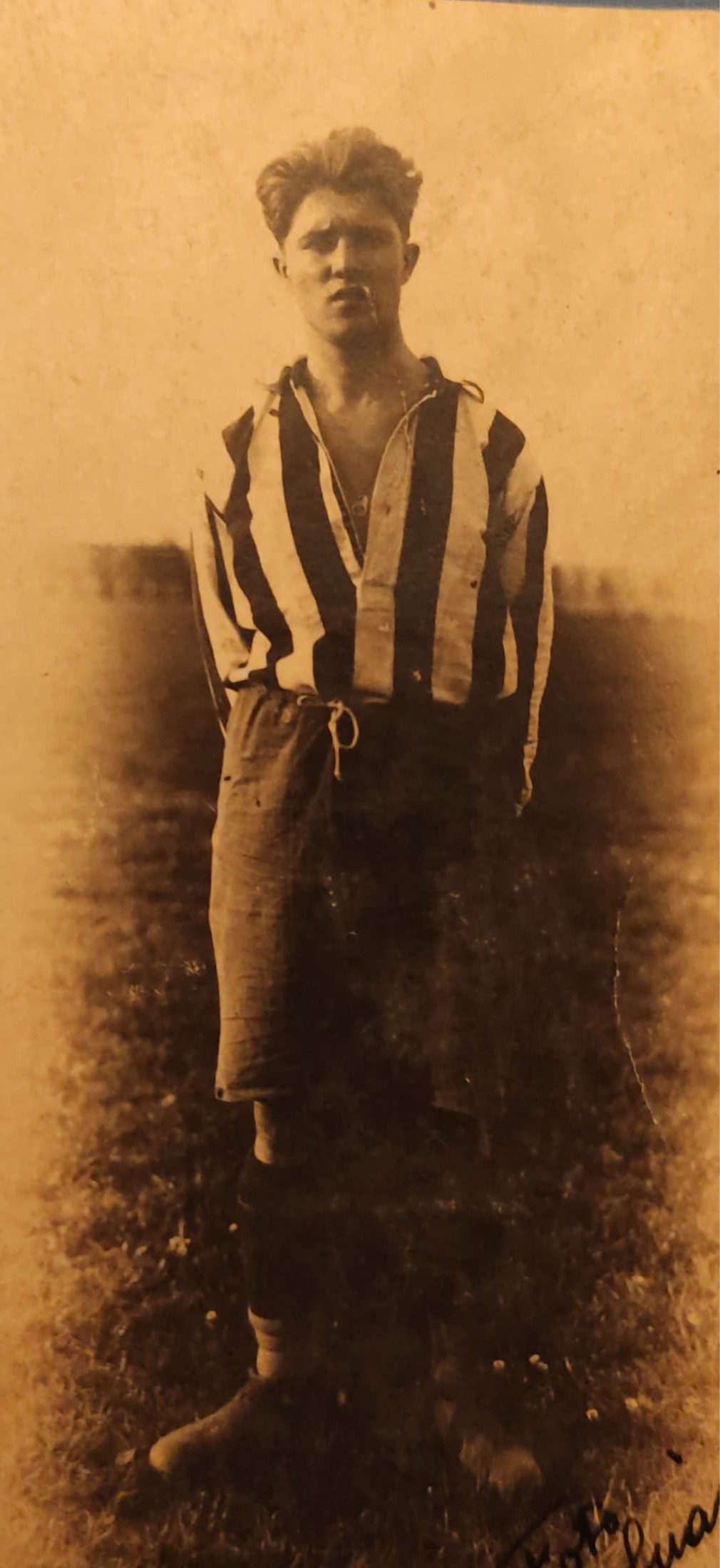

Personal information
- Full name: Vicente Palacios González
- Date of birth: 1900
- Place of birth: Gijón, Spain
- Date of death: 7 December 1936 (aged 35–36)
- Position: Forward

Senior career*
Years	Team	Apps	(Gls)
1918–1924	Sporting de Gijón		
1924–1927	Atlético Madrid		
1927–1928	Racing de Madrid		
1928–1929	Atlético Madrid	2	(1)
Total		2	(1)
- * Club domestic league appearances and goals

Vicente Palacios González (1900 – 7 December 1936) was a Spanish footballer who played as a forward for Atlético Madrid in the 1920s. He is best known for scoring Atlético's first-ever goal in La Liga in 1929.

== Career ==
Vicente Palacios was born in Muniello-Poago, a village near Gijón, to a family originally from Candás. He began his career in the youth ranks of his hometown club Sporting de Gijón, reaching the club's first team in 1918, aged 18, with whom he played for six years, until 1924, scoring a total of 22 goals in 44 official matches. Palacios helped Sporting win the Asturian regional championship in 1922 and 1923. In addition to his strength and speed, he was also noted for his good dribbling and shooting.

Once he settled in the Spanish capital to work as a commercial expert in 1924, Palacios signed for Atlético Madrid, helping his side win the Centro Championship in 1924. He stated there for three years, until 1927, when he joined Racing de Madrid, but at the end of the season, he returned to Atlético. Palacios started in the opening match of the inaugural edition of La Liga on 10 February 1929, in which he opened the scoring in an eventual 3–2 win over Arenas de Getxo, thus recording the first-ever La Liga goal in the club's history, as well as the second-ever goal in the history of La Liga, being beaten only by Pitus Prat of Espanyol, who scored in the 5th minute of his respective match.

Throughout his career, Palacios scored one goal in 2 La Liga matches for Atlético.

== International career ==
Like so many other Sporting de Gijón player of his time, Palacios played several matches for the Asturias national team, being a member of the Asturian team that won the 1922–23 Prince of Asturias Cup, an official inter-regional competition organized by the RFEF. However, he played a small role in this triumph, as he only played the opening match of the tournament against Biscay on 12 November 1922, which ended in a 1–1 draw.

== Later life ==
After retiring from football, he ran a food warehouse and distribution company with his teammate Alfonso Olaso and film actor Raúl Cancio, as well as a fruit and vegetable shop in the Chamberí neighborhood. He died in Madrid on December 7, 1936.

== Honours ==
=== Club ===
Sporting de Gijón

- Asturian Championship
  - Champions (2): 1921–22 and 1922–23

Atlético Madrid

- Centro Championship
  - Champions (1): 1924–25

=== International ===
Asturias

- Prince of Asturias Cup:
  - Champions (1): 1922–23
