= Agustín Cruella =

Spanish footballer and referee

Personal information
- Full name: Agustín Cruella Tena
- Date of birth: 29 August 1897
- Place of birth: Barcelona, Catalonia, Spain
- Date of death: 29 September 1968 (aged 71)
- Place of death: Berga, Catalonia, Spain
- Position: Forward

Senior career*
Years	Team	Apps	(Gls)
1912–1915	FC Internacional		
1915–1920	FC Espanya		
- * Club domestic league appearances and goals

Agustín Cruella Tena (29 August 1897 - 29 September 1968) was a Spanish footballer who played as a forward for FC Espanya, and later become a football referee. In 1928, he was involved in a controversial incident known as "the first ghost goal".

== Playing career ==
Born in Barcelona, Cruella began his career as a midfielder at FC Internacional in 1912, playing for them until 1915, when he signed for FC Espanya along with Rafael Raich. With Espanya he become a forward, from where he helped his club to compete head-to-head against the likes of Barcelona and Espanyol, winning the Catalan championship in 1916–17, hence qualifying to the 1917 Copa del Rey in which he netted one goal, the opener of their second leg semi-final clash against Madrid FC on 8 April 1917 which ended in a 3–1 win, thus forcing the reply where they were beaten.

== Refereeing career ==
Cruella became a referee in 1920, shortly after his retirement. His most important task was to oversee the matches of the Catalan championship, and if available, the Copa del Rey. He was a referee in the first-ever Spanish league in 1928, with more than 100 matches refereed between the First and Second Division, between 1928 and 1947. He also refereed one match of the 1923–24 Prince of Asturias Cup, which was a quarter-final between Centro and Galicia that ended in a 1–0 win for the Castilians.

On 7 October 1928, in a Catalan championship match between RCD Espanyol and CE Europa, held at the Sarrià Stadium, Cruella took the controversial decision of disallowing a goal from Europa's Manuel Cros after protests from Espanyol's goalkeeper Ricardo Zamora, who claimed there was a hole in the net through which the ball went in. His linesmen, Pedro Prada and Enrique Peris, and especially Joaquín Just, who was in charge of monitoring Espanyol's goal, told him otherwise, that the goal was legal, however, Cruella ruled it out, and the match ended in a goalless draw. This incident is known in Spain as "the first ghost goal".

On 20 June 1943, he referred the 1943 Copa del Generalísimo Final between Club Atlético de Bilbao and Real Madrid CF, which was won by the latter 1–0 after extra-time.

== Honours ==
FC Espanya

Catalan championship:

- Champions (1): 1916-17
