= Manuel Cros =

Spanish footballer and manager

Personal information
- Full name: Manuel Cros Grau
- Date of birth: 1 September 1901
- Place of birth: Calanda, Aragon, Spain
- Date of death: 1 February 1986 (aged 84)
- Place of death: Barcelona, Catalonia, Spain
- Position: Center-forward

Youth career
- -: Espanyol
- 1919–1920: FC Internacional

Senior career*
Years	Team	Apps	(Gls)
1920–1921	CE Júpiter		
1921–1922	FC Martinenc		
1922–1931	CE Europa		
1928	→ FC Barcelona (on loan)		
1931–1933	FC Martinenc		
1933	RCD Espanyol		
1934	CE Sabadell		
1934–1935	Tàrrega SC		
1935–1936	Santfeliuenc FC		
1937-1938	RCD Espanyol		

International career
1923-1929	Catalonia	12	(7)

Managerial career
- 1941-1942: CE Manresa
- 1946-1947: UE Sant Andreu
- 1948-1949: CD Atlético Baleares
- * Club domestic league appearances and goals

Manuel Cros Grau (1 September 1901 – 1 February 1986) was a Spanish footballer who played as a center-forward for CE Europa and Espanyol. He is considered the most emblematic player in the history of CE Europa and one of the great stars of Catalan football in the 1920s alongside the likes of Zamora and Samitier, with even his haircut (brush style) being known in the barbershops of the time as "Cros's style". He also played two unofficial matches for FC Barcelona, scoring four goals. He later became a manager.

== Club career ==
=== CE Europa ===
Born in Calanda, Cros moved to Catalonia from an early age and always considered himself Catalan. After playing for FC Internacional, CE Júpiter and later for FC Martinenc, a club where he began to receive a salary, Cros was signed by CE Europa in 1922. He quickly established himself as an indisputable starter, forming a great attacking partnership with Mauricio, Pellicer and Alcázar. In his first season at the club, he played a crucial role in helping CE Europa win the Catalan Championship in 1923 after beating Barcelona 1–0 in a play-off title-decider. Cros then played a pivotal role in helping Europa reach their first-ever Copa del Rey final in 1923, where they were beaten by Athletic Bilbao 0–1, courtesy of a goal from Travieso. Nevertheless, Barcelona made him a sensational offer: 50,000 pesetas, when his salary was 500 plus bonus per goal scored, but he refused and stayed with Europa.

On 7 October 1928, in a Catalan championship match between Europa and RCD Espanyol, he opened the scoring with a goal past Ricardo Zamora. However, the referee of the game, Agustín Cruella, controversially disallowed his goal after Zamora protested that there was a hole in the side-netting through which the ball had gone in. This incident is known in Spain as "the first ghost goal". Two months after this incident, in December 1928, Cros played two friendly matches for FC Barcelona against Hungarian club Ferencvárosi TC, netting a hat-trick on Christmas Day in a 4–0 win and scoring once in the following day in a 3–3 draw.

Cros was part of the CE Europa side that participated in the first-ever edition of the Spanish League in 1929, being one of the tournament's top scorers with 11 goals. He was the first player in the history of the Spanish league to score a pure hat-trick, which he achieved on the second day against Arenas Club de Getxo. The first player to score a hat-trick in La Liga was Real Madrid's Jaime Lazcano in matchday one against CE Europa, but his treble was interrupted by a goal from teammate Rafael Morera while Cros's netted his three goals consecutively. Cros went on to score against none Real Madrid in the return fixture to help his side to a 5–2 victory, thus becoming the first-ever club to score five goals against the whites in a league match. He was Europa's star man during the only three seasons that the club spent in the national league.

=== Later career ===
In 1931 Cros left the club in a tribute match between Europa and Barcelona, which ended 1-5 to Barcelona. He remains the top scorer of the Gracien club with 114 goals in official matches. In 1931, at the age of 30, he joined FC Martinenc as a player-coach, where he remained until 1933, when he left to join Espanyol as a veteran substitute player. After short spells at CE Sabadell, Tàrrega SC, and Santfeliuenc FC, he retired as a player, but during the Spanish Civil War, due to the lack of players to make up the squad, Cros rejoined Espanyol where he played his last season as a footballer in the 1937–38 season.

== International career ==
Cros played five matches for the Catalan national team, including the one against Bolton on 20 May 1929 on the occasion of the inauguration of the Estadi Olímpic Lluís Companys, which had been built for the 1929 Expo in Barcelona, and surprisingly, the Catalan team won by a score of 4–0.

== Playing style ==
Cros was a pure center-forward by the standards of the time. He was called the Tiger, a relentless auctioneer "with the charge of a buffalo".

== Managerial career ==
After retiring Cros coached several modest clubs such as CE Manresa (1941–42), UE Sant Andreu (1946–47), and CD Atlético Baleares (1948–49).

== Legacy ==
In 1967, Cros was awarded the silver medal by the Catalan Football Federation. Cros died in Barcelona on 1 February 1986, at the age of 84.

Despite being considered the most emblematic player in the history of CE Europa, no one with a profound interest in Europa's history knew that Cros had scored the first pure hat-trick in the history of La Liga until recently when an article by the football magazine Don Balón published in 2007, while the club was celebrating its centenary, revealed this fact that allowed Europa to star again in the history of national football.

On 26 March 2023, a plaque in memory of Manuel Cros Grau was unveiled in recognition of his sporting career in the passage located between Pau Alsina Street and Sardenya Street under the Nou Sardenya stadium. The event was attended by the councilor of the District of Gracia, Eloi Badia, the councilor of Nomenclàtor i Memòria of the District of Gracia, Àngels Tomás, as well as family and friends.

== Honours ==
CE Europa

Catalan championship:

- Champions (1): 1922–23

Copa del Rey:

- Runner-up (1): 1923
