= Cándido Mauricio =

Spanish footballer

Personal information
- Full name: Cándido Mauricio Sánchez
- Date of birth: 5 May 1900
- Place of birth: Vélez-Rubio, Andalusia, Spain
- Date of death: 16 January 1952 (aged 51)
- Place of death: Barcelona, Catalonia, Spain
- Position: Midfielder

Senior career*
Years	Team	Apps	(Gls)
1919–1924	CF Badalona		
1924–1931	CE Europa	33	(6)

International career
1923-29	Catalonia	11	(0)
Medal record
Catalonia
Prince of Asturias Cup
Gold medal – first place	1926 Prince of Asturias Cup	Team
- * Club domestic league appearances and goals

Cándido Mauricio Sánchez (5 May 1900 – 16 January 1952) was a Spanish footballer who played as a midfielder.

== Club career ==
Born in Vélez-Rubio, Andalusia, he moved to Catalonia as a child and there he started his career with CF Badalona in 1919 and remained in the team for 5 seasons. with CE Europa in 1917. Along with the likes of Cros and Alcázar, he was part of the attacking front of the great CE Europa side of the twenties.

== International career ==
As a player of CF Badalona, and later of CE Europa, he was eligible to play for the Catalonia national team, being summoned several times during the 20s. Together with Paulino Alcántara, Josep Samitier and Ricardo Zamora, he was part of the great Catalonia side of the twenties that won the 1926 Prince of Asturias Cup, an inter-regional competition organized by the RFEF.

== Honours ==
=== International ===
Catalonia

Prince of Asturias Cup:

- Champions (1): 1926
