= Sergio García (footballer, born 1983) =

Spanish football manager and former player

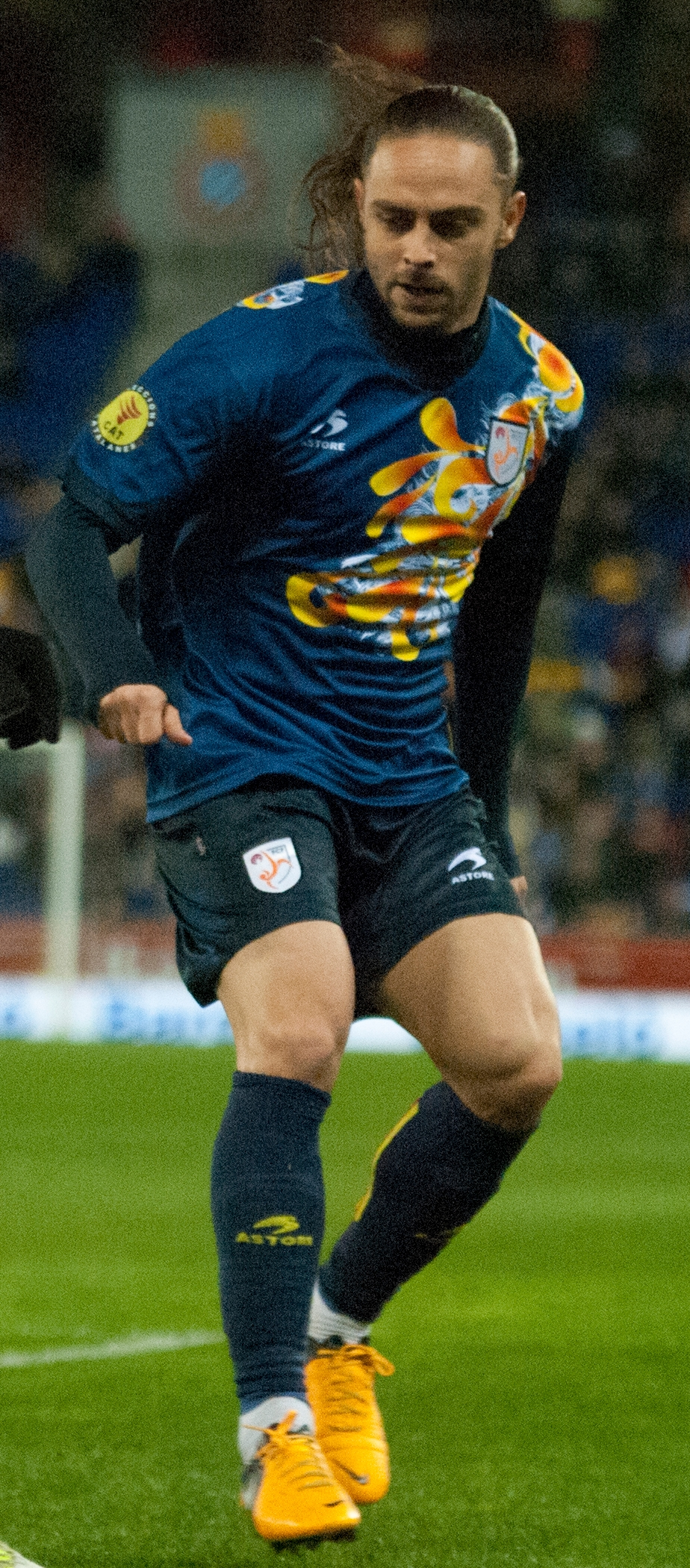
- García with Catalonia in 2013

Personal information
- Full name: Sergio García de la Fuente
- Date of birth: 9 June 1983 (age 43)
- Place of birth: Barcelona, Spain
- Height: 1.74 m (5 ft 9 in)
- Positions: Forward; winger

Team information
- Current team: Espanyol B (manager)

Youth career
- 1989–1993: Bon Pastor
- 1993–1995: Damm
- 1995–2002: Barcelona
- 1997–1999: → Damm (loan)

Senior career*
Years	Team	Apps	(Gls)
2001–2002	Barcelona C	22	(11)
2002–2004	Barcelona B	60	(34)
2002–2005	Barcelona	4	(0)
2004–2005	→ Levante (loan)	31	(7)
2005–2008	Zaragoza	90	(14)
2008–2010	Betis	62	(21)
2010–2015	Espanyol	145	(41)
2015–2017	Al-Rayyan	49	(27)
2017–2019	Espanyol	62	(4)
2020–2021	Montañesa	8	(3)
Total		533	(162)

International career
1999	Spain U16	2	(1)
2001	Spain U17	3	(1)
2001–2002	Spain U19	9	(7)
2003	Spain U20	11	(7)
2004–2005	Spain U21	11	(4)
2008	Spain	2	(0)
2003–2019	Catalonia	16	(9)

Managerial career
- 2022–2025: Damm U19
- 2025–2026: Spain U17
- 2026–: Espanyol B
- 2026: Espanyol (caretaker)
Medal record
Representing Spain
Men's football
UEFA European Championship
Winner	2008 Austria–Switzerland
- * Club domestic league appearances and goals

Sergio García de la Fuente (Spanish pronunciation: [ˈseɾxjo ɣaɾˈθi.a]; (Note: In isolation, García is pronounced [ɡaɾˈθi.a].) born 9 June 1983) is a Spanish former professional footballer. Mainly a forward, he could also appear as a winger, preferably on the right. He is currently manager of Espanyol B.

After starting out at Barcelona, he went on to represent mainly Zaragoza and Espanyol, serving as captain of the latter. Over 14 seasons, he amassed La Liga totals of 360 matches and 75 goals.

García appeared for Spain at Euro 2008, winning the tournament. He also played for the Catalonia national team in unofficial matches.

== Club career ==
=== Barcelona ===
Born in Barcelona, Catalonia, García rose through the ranks of FC Barcelona, finding however opportunities almost non-existent in the senior squad. A frequent scorer for the reserves in the Segunda División B, he made his first-team debut on 29 October 2002, coming on as a substitute for Geovanni for the final 28 minutes of a 2–0 away win against Club Brugge KV in that season's UEFA Champions League; he made another cameo in that competition the following 19 March, in a 2–0 victory at Newcastle United in the second group phase.

On 3 September 2003, García started in his La Liga debut in his first match at the Camp Nou, a 1–1 draw with Sevilla FC. On 1 March of the following year, he signed a three-year contract extension.

García was loaned to Levante UD on 21 July 2004, ahead of the upcoming top-flight campaign. He scored his first goal in the competition on 3 October to complete a 2–0 win over RCD Mallorca at the Estadi Ciutat de València, ranking team top scorer as the Valencians were relegated; his last goal came on 5 May 2004 in a 3–1 away loss to Albacete Balompié, where he was sent off moments later for fighting with Santi.

=== Zaragoza ===
Garcia played all 38 matches for Real Zaragoza in 2007–08, as they were eventually relegated from the top tier. At the beginning of the following season, he was linked with a number of Premier League clubs including Liverpool, Tottenham Hotspur, West Ham United and Stoke City, along with teammate Diego Milito. Rumours that he would leave Zaragoza had been further fuelled after the club's relegation, as he was thrown out of a side pre-season training session by manager Marcelino García Toral and was then left out of their opening day defeat against Levante.

=== Betis ===
On 1 September 2008, in the dying seconds of the transfer window, after continuous rumours, García signed for Real Betis, for a fee close to €10 million. He scored his first goal for his new club on 27 September in the team's home game against Real Madrid (2–1 loss), following up on his own saved penalty. On 16 November he netted a brace in at 3–1 home win over Racing de Santander and, on 18 January of the following year, added another in the 3–1 away defeat of Real Valladolid in which he also assisted the other goal.

García was sent off three times in the first half of the season. On 7 February 2009, he helped Betis achieve a landmark victory at neighbouring Sevilla, scoring in a 2–1 win. In form, he was struck with a knee injury after celebrating his goal against CD Numancia, a 3–3 home draw on 4 April, eventually missing a month of competition – with the team struggling during this time – and eventually dropping down a level at the end.

García scored 12 goals in the 2009–10 campaign, but the Andalusians failed to win promotion.

=== Espanyol ===
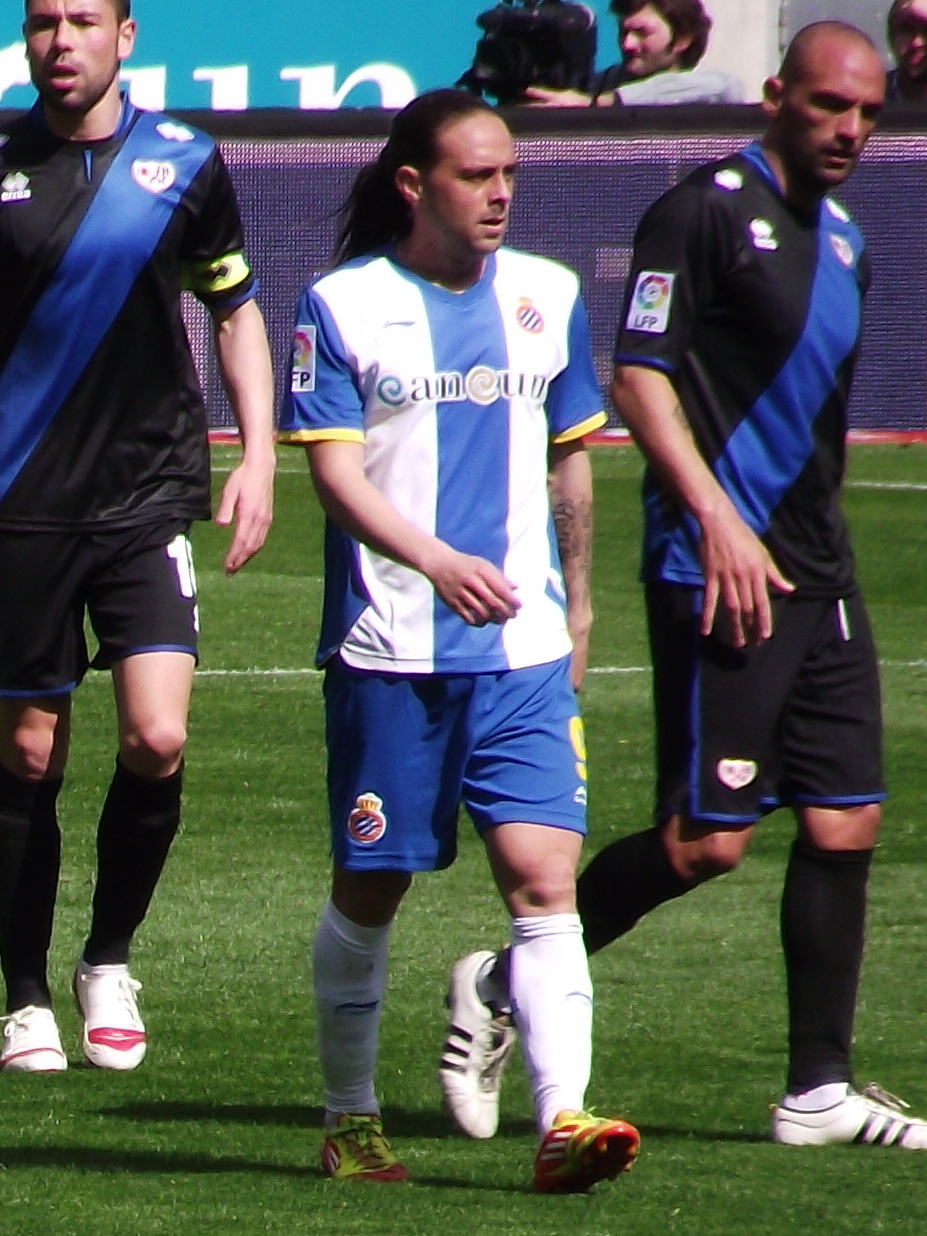
García playing for Espanyol in 2012

In August 2010, García signed a five-year contract with RCD Espanyol, moving to the club as a replacement to veteran Raúl Tamudo who left after nearly 20 years of service. He did not score in his first 15 games for Mauricio Pochettino's team, ending the drought on 9 January 2011 when as a substitute he concluded a 4–0 home victory over former team Zaragoza, assisted by his namesake Luis.

On 24 November 2013, García scored his first hat-trick for the Pericos in a 4–1 win at Rayo Vallecano – two of his three goals came from the penalty spot. The following season, he netted a career-best (in Spain) 14 league goals.

=== Al-Rayyan ===
García turned down an offer to join Qatar's Al Sadd SC, who had recently signed Barcelona's Xavi. On 29 June, however, he joined Al-Rayyan SC in the same country. He made his debut on 11 September, starting in a 4–0 Stars League home win against Al-Sailiya SC, and scored his first goal on 2 October when he confirmed a 2–0 victory over Al-Mesaimeer Sports Club at the Thani bin Jassim Stadium; on 22 November, he scored twice and assisted one of Rodrigo Tabata's four goals in a league record 9–0 rout at Qatar SC.

On 5 March 2016, García netted once in a 5–0 win at Al-Wakrah Sport Club that handed his team their first league title in 21 years, and with five games to spare.

=== Later career ===
On 16 June 2017, aged 34, García returned to Espanyol after agreeing to a one-year contract. Exactly two years later, he left.

In November 2020, García returned to football at Nou Barris-based CF Montañesa of the Tercera División, signing alongside his former Barcelona and Espanyol teammate Joan Verdú.

== International career ==
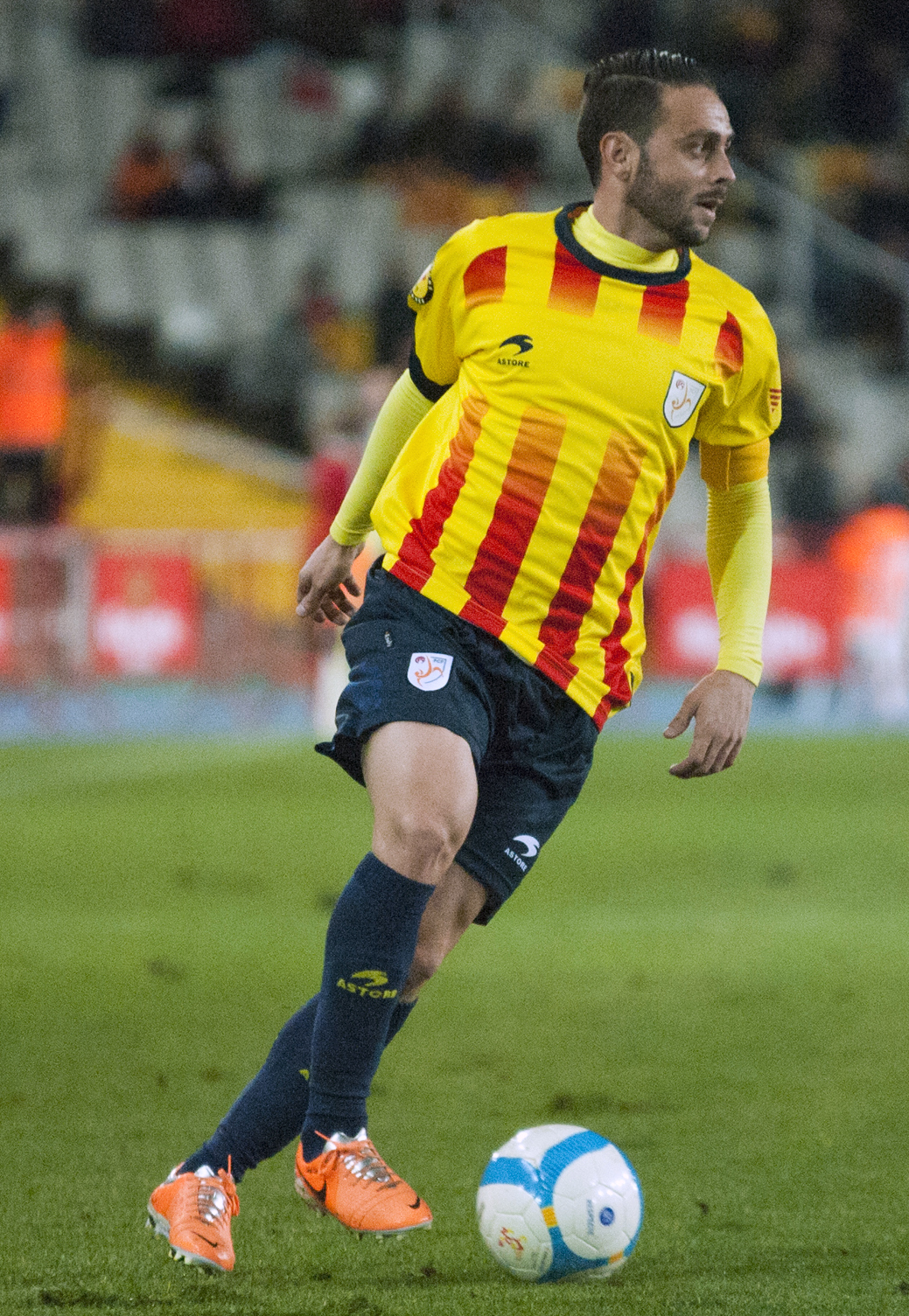
García in action for Catalonia in 2013

García was part of the Spain under-19 team that won the 2002 UEFA European Championship in Norway, equalising in the 3–1 win over Slovakia in their final group game in Drammen. On 22 October 2003, against the same country but at under-20 level, he netted a hat-trick in a 4–0 win in preparation for the FIFA World Youth Championship. During the tournament in the United Arab Emirates, he scored against Mali in the group and netted the only goal against Paraguay in the last 16, as the nation finished as runners-up.

Without having been previously capped, García made the Spanish final squad-of-23 for UEFA Euro 2008 (which Spain went on to win) as a replacement for Barcelona's Bojan Krkić. He made his debut for the national side on 31 May 2008, coming on as an 83rd-minute substitute for David Silva in a 2–1 friendly win against Peru in Huelva. He made his debut on 18 June, playing for the full 90 minutes against Greece in Spain's third and final group D game in Euro 2008: in the 88th minute, he delivered a pinpoint left-footed cross for Dani Güiza to head home the 2–1 winner.

García also represented Spain at all youth levels, as well as appearing frequently for the unofficial Catalan national team. On 22 December 2009, he scored the side's first goal in a 4–2 defeat of Argentina and, on 30 December 2013, he netted twice in a 4–1 victory over Cape Verde. In March 2019, he played his 16th game against Venezuela in Girona, and surpassed Sergio González as the most capped player in its history.

== Coaching career ==
García started his managerial career in 2021 with CF Damm, as part of the club's under-19 staff. The following year, he was promoted to head coaching duties, succeeding his former Espanyol and Spain teammate Luis García.

On 22 July 2025, García was appointed manager of the Spain national under-17 team. He left the role one year later, and returned to Espanyol shortly after to sign a two-year contract with their reserves.

On 28 October 2026, García was named caretaker of the first team following Manolo González's dismissal, being in charge in the 1–0 away win over Villarreal CF two days later before Eder Sarabia's appointment.

== Career statistics ==
=== Club ===
Appearances and goals by club, season and competition
Club	Season	League			National cup (Note: Includes Copa del Rey)		Other		Total	
Club	Season	Division	Apps	Goals	Apps	Goals	Apps	Goals	Apps	Goals
Barcelona	2002–03	La Liga	0	0	0	0	2 (Note: Appearances in UEFA Champions League)	0	2	0
Barcelona	2003–04	La Liga	4	0	2	0	1 (Note: Appearances in UEFA Cup)	0	7	0
Barcelona	Total		4	0	2	0	3	0	9	0
Levante (loan)	2004–05	La Liga	31	7	1	0	—		32	7
Zaragoza	2005–06	La Liga	19	4	6	0	—		25	4
Zaragoza	2006–07	La Liga	33	6	6	2	—		39	8
Zaragoza	2007–08	La Liga	38	4	4	1	2	0	44	5
Zaragoza	Total		90	14	16	3	2	0	108	17
Betis	2008–09	La Liga	28	9	4	1	—		32	10
Betis	2009–10	Segunda División	34	12	1	0	—		35	12
Betis	Total		62	21	5	1	—		67	22
Espanyol	2010–11	La Liga	21	3	4	0	—		25	3
Espanyol	2011–12	La Liga	24	5	3	2	—		27	7
Espanyol	2012–13	La Liga	28	7	0	0	—		28	7
Espanyol	2013–14	La Liga	37	12	4	1	—		41	13
Espanyol	2014–15	La Liga	35	14	6	1	—		41	15
Espanyol	Total		145	41	17	4	—		162	45
Al-Rayyan	2015–16	Qatar Stars League	24	16	0	0	—		24	16
Al-Rayyan	2016–17	Qatar Stars League	25	11	0	0	6 (Note: Appearances in AFC Champions League)	3	31	14
Al-Rayyan	Total		49	27	0	0	6	3	55	30
Espanyol	2017–18	La Liga	33	2	5	1	—		38	3
Espanyol	2018–19	La Liga	29	2	2	0	—		31	2
Espanyol	Total		62	4	7	1	—		69	5
Montañesa	2020–21	Tercera División	8	3	0	0	—		8	3
Career total			451	117	48	9	11	3	508	129

== Managerial statistics ==
As of 25 October 2026

Managerial record by team and tenure
Team	Nat	From	To	Record								Ref
Team	Nat	From	To	G	W	D	L	GF	GA	GD	Win %	Ref
Spain U17	(Spain)	22 July 2025	7 July 2026	19	15	3	1	54	11	+43	78.95	
Espanyol B	(Spain)	7 July 2026	Present	7	5	1	1	17	5	+12	71.43	
Career total				26	20	4	2	71	16	+55	76.92	—

== Honours ==
Al-Rayan

- Qatar Stars League: 2015–16

Spain

- UEFA European Championship: 2008

Spain U19

- UEFA European Under-19 Championship: 2002

Spain U20

- FIFA U-20 World Cup runner-up: 2003
