= Travieso (footballer) =

Spanish footballer

Personal information
- Full name: Manuel López Llamosas
- Date of birth: 1 May 1900
- Place of birth: Barakaldo, Spain
- Date of death: 14 October 1975 (aged 75)
- Place of death: Barakaldo, Spain
- Position: Forward

Youth career
- Real Zaragoza
- CE Sabadell

Senior career*
Years	Team	Apps	(Gls)
1918–1920	Barakaldo		
1920–1921	Arenas Club		
1921–1924	Athletic Bilbao		
1924–1926	Barakaldo		
1926–1928	Athletic Bilbao		
1928–1929	Gimnástico		
1929–1930	Albacete Balompié		
1930	Cartagena	0	(0)
1930–1931	FC Malagueño		
1931	Sporting de Gijón	0	(0)
1935	Ceuta		
1941	Córdoba	1	(0)

International career
1922	Spain	1	(2)
1921–1924	Biscay		

Managerial career
- 1924–1926: Barakaldo (player-manager)
- 1930–1931: FC Malagueño (player-manager)
- 1931–1932: Real Jaén
- 1939–1940: Xerez
- 1940–1941: Córdoba (player-manager)
- 1941–1942: Constància
- 1942–1943: Barakaldo
- 1943–1944: Racing de Santander
- 1945: Real Murcia
- 1946–1948: Puebla
- 1949: Barakaldo
- 1950: Barakaldo
- 1960–1961: Real Jaén
- * Club domestic league appearances and goals

Manuel López Llamosas (1 May 1900 – 14 October 1975), known as Travieso, was a Spanish footballer who represented multiple teams in Spain. He was capped once by the Spain national football team in 1922, scoring twice.

== Club career ==
Travieso started his career in the academies of Real Zaragoza and CE Sabadell, before going on to play regional football. Travieso's career highlight was his three-year spell at Athletic Bilbao (1921 to 1924), scoring 24 goals in just 22 appearances for the club, including the only goal of the 1923 Copa del Rey Final against Europa.

== International career ==
He earned only one cap for Spain, but he made it count as he scored two goals in a 4–0 win over France on 30 April 1922.

While he was an Athletic Bilbao player, he played for the Biscay national team, being part of the team that participated in two tournaments of the Prince of Asturias Cup in the early 20s, scoring once in the 1922-23 edition and scoring twice in 1923-24 as Biscay beat Asturias 4–2, thus reaching the semi-finals where they were eliminated by Catalonia 0-1 due to a goal from Cristóbal Martí.

== Career statistics ==
=== Club ===
Club	Season	League			Cup		Continental		Other		Total	
Club	Season	Division	Apps	Goals	Apps	Goals	Apps	Goals	Apps	Goals	Apps	Goals
Athletic Bilbao	1921–22	Biscay Championship	6	7	0	0	–		0	0	6	7
Athletic Bilbao	1922–23	Biscay Championship	9	11	4	3	–		0	0	13	14
Athletic Bilbao	1923–24	Biscay Championship	7	6	0	0	–		0	0	7	6
Athletic Bilbao	1926–27	Biscay Championship	8	4	3	0	–		0	0	11	4
Athletic Bilbao	1927–28	Biscay Championship	1	1	0	0	–		0	0	1	1
Athletic Bilbao	Total		31	29	7	3	0	0	0	0	38	32
Cartagena	1930–31	Tercera División	0	0	0	0	–		0	0	0	0
Sporting de Gijón	1930–31	Segunda División	0	0	2	0	–		0	0	2	0
Córdoba	1940–41	Segunda División	1	0	1	0	–		0	0	2	0
Career total			32	29	10	3	0	0	0	0	42	32

=== International ===
Appearances and goals by national team and year
National team	Year	Apps	Goals
Spain	1922	1	2
Total		1	2

=== International goals ===
Scores and results list Spain's goal tally first, score column indicates score after each Spain goal.

List of international goals scored by Juka
No.	Date	Venue	Opponent	Score	Result	Competition
1	30 April 1922	Stade Sainte-Germaine, Bordeaux, France	France	3–0	4–0	Friendly
2	30 April 1922	Stade Sainte-Germaine, Bordeaux, France	France	4–0	4–0	Friendly
