= 1927–28 Real Madrid CF season =

26th season in existence of Real Madrid CF

Real Madrid
1927–28 season
- President: Luis de Urquijo
- Manager: José Berraondo
- Stadium: Estadio Chamartín
- Campeonato Regional Centro (Note: The Campeonato Regional Centro (Central Regional Championship) was a regional league used as a qualifier for the Copa del Rey.): Runners-up
- Copa Federación Centro: Winners
- Copa del Rey: Quarter-finals
- Top goalscorer: League: Gual (15); All: Gual (22); Luis Uribe (22)
- Biggest win: Real Madrid 9–0 CD Nacional
- Biggest defeat: Real Sociedad 5–1 Real Madrid; Athletic Bilbao 4–0 Real Madrid; Racing de Santander 4–0 Real Madrid
Home colours	Away colours

The 1927–28 season was Real Madrid Club de Fútbol's 26th season in existence. The club played some friendly matches including their first ever tour of the Americas. They also played in the Campeonato Regional Centro (Central Regional Championship), the Copa del Rey and the Copa Federación Centro (Central Federation Cup).

Real Madrid also played in the Torneo de Campeones, a competition involving the six teams that had previously won the Copa del Rey. The competition was played with a make shift schedule and the teams had been scheduled to play each other in a double round-robin format, however all matches could not be played, and some teams including Real Madrid only played 9 games. The Torneo de Campeones served as a rehearsal for the establishment of La Liga, the first national football league in Spain, the following season.

== Summary ==
Real Madrid embarked on their first ever tour of the Americas visiting Argentina, Uruguay, Peru, Cuba, Mexico and the United States over a period of three and half months during the season. The tour was organised by José García Echaniz, and Santiago Bernabéu was the club representative. The tour began on 9 July 1927 with a match against Argentine side Combinado Buenos Aires, a team made up of players from clubs based in Buenos Aires. The last match of the tour was played against American side Galicia SC on 24 September 1927 in New York City.

== Players ==
Note: Flags indicate national team as defined under FIFA eligibility rules; some limited exceptions apply. Players may hold more than one non-FIFA nationality.

No.	Pos.	Nation	Player
—	GK	ESP	Cándido Martínez
—	GK	ESP	Antonio Castro
—	DF	ESP	Félix Quesada
—	DF	ESP	Juan Urquizu
—	DF	ESP	Patricio Escobal
—	DF	ESP	Luis de Uribe
—	DF	ESP	Lope Peña
—	DF	ESP	Guillermo Yllera
—	MF	ESP	Manuel Prats
—	MF	ESP	Desiderio Esparza
—	MF	ESP	José María Peña

No.	Pos.	Nation	Player
—	MF	ESP	Rafael Lozano
—	MF	ESP	Desiderio Esparza
—	MF	ESP	Antonio Merino
—	MF	ESP	Miguel Álvarez García
—	FW	ESP	Gerónimo del Campo
—	FW	ESP	Félix Pérez
—	FW	ESP	Francisco Moraleda
—	FW	ESP	José María Muñagorri
—	FW	ESP	Valentín Gual
—	FW	ESP	José Menéndez

== Friendlies ==
9 July 1927 Friendly	Combinado Buenos Aires (Argentina)	0–0	(Spain) Real Madrid	Buenos Aires, Argentina
		Report		Stadium: Barracas
Note: Combinado Buenos Aires was a team made up of players from teams in Buenos Aires.

10 July 1927 Friendly	Combinado Buenos Aires (Argentina)	3–2	(Spain) Real Madrid	Buenos Aires, Argentina
		Report		Stadium: Barracas
Note: Combinado Buenos Aires was a team made up of players from teams in Buenos Aires.

16 July 1927 Friendly	Boca Juniors (Argentina)	1–2	(Spain) Real Madrid	Buenos Aires, Argentina
		Report		Stadium: Barracas

17 July 1927 Friendly	Newell's Old Boys (Argentina)	4–0	(Spain) Real Madrid	Rosario, Argentina
		Report		Stadium: El Coloso

24 July 1927 Friendly	CA Peñarol (Uruguay)	0–0	(Spain) Real Madrid	Montevideo, Uruguay
		Report		Stadium: Estadio Pocitos

30 July 1927 Friendly	Racing Club de Avellaneda (Argentina)	2–0	(Spain) Real Madrid	Buenos Aires, Argentina
		Report		Stadium: Estadio Racing Club

14 August 1927 Friendly	Selección Chalaca (Peru)	1–4	(Spain) Real Madrid	Lima, Peru
		Report		Stadium: Estadio Nacional
Note: Selección Chalaca was a team made up almost entirely by players from Club Alianza Lima

15 August 1927 Friendly	Combinado Limeño (Peru)	1–1	(Spain) Real Madrid	Lima, Peru
		Report		Stadium: Estadio Nacional
Note: Selección Chalaca was a team made up almost entirely by players from Club Alianza Lima

28 August 1927 Friendly	Juventud Asturiana (Cuba)	1–2	(Spain) Real Madrid	Havana, Cuba
		Report		Stadium: Almerades Park

4 September 1927 Friendly	Club América (Mexico)	2–4	(Spain) Real Madrid	Mexico City, Mexico
		Report		Stadium: Parque España

8 September 1927 Friendly	Club Asturias (Mexico)	0–6	(Spain) Real Madrid	Mexico City, Mexico
		Report		Stadium: Parque España

11 September 1927 Friendly	Real Club España (Mexico)	2–8	(Spain) Real Madrid	Mexico City, Mexico
		Report		Stadium: Parque España

14 September 1927 Friendly	Club Atlante (Mexico)	1–4	(Spain) Real Madrid	Mexico City, Mexico
		Report		Stadium: Parque España

16 September 1927 Friendly	Club Necaxa (Mexico)	0–5	(Spain) Real Madrid	Mexico City, Mexico
		Report		Stadium: Parque España

18 September 1927 Friendly	Club América (Mexico)	3–5	(Spain) Real Madrid	Mexico City, Mexico
		Report		Stadium: Parque España

24 September 1927 Friendly	Galicia SC (United States)	1–1	(Spain) Real Madrid	New York City, United States
		Report		Stadium: Hawthorne Field

21 February 1928 Friendly	Racing de Madrid	3–4	Real Madrid	Madrid
		Report		Stadium: Martínez Campos

9 April 1928 Friendly	CA Osasuna	2–2	Real Madrid	Pamplona
		Report		Stadium: San Juan Stadium

27 May 1928 Friendly	Arenas Club de Getxo	0–2	Real Madrid	Madrid
		Report		Stadium: Princesa

28 May 1928 Friendly	CE Europa	5–5	Real Madrid	Barcelona
		Report		Stadium: Gràcia

30 May 1928 Friendly	SD Aranjuez	3–1	Real Madrid	Aranjuez
		Report

10 June 1928 Friendly	Real Madrid	1–1	Levante UD	Madrid
		Report		Stadium: Estadio Chamartín

29 June 1928 Friendly	Albacete Balompié	0–4	Real Madrid	Albacete
		Report		Stadium: Paseo de la Cuba

1 July 1928 Friendly	Albacete Balompié	2–0	Real Madrid	Albacete
		Report		Stadium: Paseo de la Cuba

== Competitions ==
=== Overview ===
Competition	First match	Last match	Starting round	Final position	Record							
Competition	First match	Last match	Starting round	Final position	Pld	W	D	L	GF	GA	GD	Win %
Torneo de Campeones	12 October 1927	3 June 1928	Matchday 1	4th	9	2	3	4	16	24	−8	22.22
Campeonato Regional Centro	16 October 1927	22 January 1928	Matchday 1	Runners-up	10	8	0	2	38	10	+28	80.00
Copa del Rey	31 January 1928	29 April 1928	Qualifying round	Quarter-finals	14	8	3	3	36	22	+14	57.14
Copa Federación Centro	7 June 1928	7 June 1928	Final	Winners	1	1	0	0	3	0	+3	100.00
Total					34	19	6	9	93	56	+37	55.88

Source: Competitions

=== Torneo de Campeones ===
12 October 1927 1	Real Madrid	4–4	Real Unión	Madrid
	Muñagorri ?'; Gual 44'; Luís Uribe 46', 80'	Report	Zabala 3'; Errazquin 20'; Echeveste ?'; Errazquin ?'	Stadium: Estadio Chamartín; Referee: Cruella

31 October 1927 2	Real Madrid	2–1	Real Sociedad	Madrid
	Moraleda	Report	Bienzobas 30' (pen.)	Stadium: Estadio Chamartín; Referee: Alonso

13 November 1927 3	Real Sociedad	5–1	Real Madrid	San Sebastián
	Marculeta ?'; Kiriki 44', 58', 70'; Bienzobas 59' (pen.)	Report	Quesada 47' (pen.)	Referee: Murgía

25 December 1927 4	Athletic Bilbao	4–0	Real Madrid	Bilbao
		Report		Stadium: San Mamés; Referee: Ezcurdia

6 May 1928 5	Real Madrid	1–4	Arenas Club de Getxo	Madrid
	Colinas ?'	Report	Gorostiza 35'; Yermo ?'; Urquizu 70' (o.g.); Prats 88' (o.g.)	Stadium: Estadio Chamartín; Referee: Eva

17 May 1928 6	Real Madrid	3–0	Athletic Bilbao	Madrid
	Rubio 25', 80'; Luis Uribe 75'	Report		Stadium: Estadio Chamartín; Referee: Melcón

21 May 1928 7	Arenas Club de Getxo	3–2	Real Madrid	Getxo
	Félix Pérez; Benegas	Report	Sesúmaga (pen.); Rivero; Gorostiza	Stadium: Ibaiondo; Referee: Aldai

27 May 1928 7	FC Barcelona	2–2	Real Madrid	Barcelona
	Ramón 7'; Arocha 62'	Report	Benegas 25'; Esparza 80'	Stadium: Camp de Les Corts; Referee: Villena

3 June 1928 9	Real Madrid	1–1	FC Barcelona	Madrid
	Gaspar Rubio 42'	Report	Sastre 88'	Stadium: Estadio Chamartín; Referee: Villena

10	Real Unión	v	Real Madrid	Irun
		Report
Note: The match was never played.

=== Campeonato Regional Centro ===
==== League table ====
Pos	Team	Pld	W	D	L	GF	GA	GD	Pts	Qualification
1	Real Madrid (Q)	10	8	0	2	38	10	+28	16	Qualification for the Copa del Rey and the Copa Federación Centro.
2	Athletic Madrid (Q)	10	8	0	2	31	10	+21	16	Qualification for the Copa del Rey and the Copa Federación Centro.
3	Racing Madrid	10	8	0	2	31	15	+16	16	
4	Nacional Madrid	10	3	1	6	14	31	−17	7	
5	RS Gimnástica	10	1	1	8	12	33	−21	3	
6	Unión SC (O)	10	1	0	9	10	37	−27	2	Qualification for the relegation play-offs

Source: Rec.Sport.Soccer Statistics Foundation
Rules for classification: 1) points; 2) tiebreaker matches
(O) Play-off winners; (Q) Qualified for the phase indicated

==== Matches ====
16 October 1927 1	Racing de Madrid	3–1	Real Madrid	Madrid
	Urquizu 5' (o.g.); Palacios 10'; Valderrama 25'	Report	Lope Peña 89'	Stadium: Estadio Metropolitano; Referee: Comorera

23 October 1927 2	Unión SC	2–5	Real Madrid	Madrid
	Victorio 86'; Mejía	Report	L. Uribe 9', 32'; Moraleda; L. Uribe; Lope Peña 81'	Stadium: Unión; Referee: P. Escartín

30 October 1927 3	Real Madrid	3–2	Athletic Madrid	Madrid
	Del Campo 30'; L. Uribe 62'; Muñagorri 69'	Report	L. Olaso 10'; Herrera 75'	Stadium: Estadio Chamartín; Referee: Navaz

6 November 1927 4	CD Nacional	0–1	Real Madrid	Madrid
		Report	Del Campo 14'	Stadium: Martínez Campos; Referee: Melcón

27 November 1927 5	Real Madrid	6–1	RS Gimnástica	Madrid
	Quesada 30' (pen.); Gual 41', 57'; Muñagorri 52'; L. Uribe 60'; Del Campo 75'	Report	Torres 15'	Stadium: Estadio Chamartín; Referee: Rasero

4 December 1927 6	Real Madrid	4–0	Racing de Madrid	Madrid
	Gual 9', 28', ?'; Lope Peña 75'	Report		Stadium: Estadio Chamartín; Referee: Comorera

11 December 1927 7	Real Madrid	6–0	Unión SC	Madrid
	L. Uribe; Gual	Report		Stadium: Estadio Chamartín; Referee: Montero

4 December 1928 8	Athletic Madrid	2–1	Real Madrid	Madrid
	Cosme 4'; Herrera 65'	Report	Gual 87'	Stadium: Estadio Metropolitano; Referee: Leonarte

1 January 1928 9	Real Madrid	9–0	CD Nacional	Madrid
	Gual; Moraleda; Gual 54'; F. Pérez; L. Uribe; F. Pérez; Gual; L. Uribe	Report		Stadium: Estadio Chamartín; Referee: Martín

12 January 1928 10	Athletic Madrid	0–2	Real Madrid	Madrid
	Gual 59'; F. Pérez 83'	Report		Stadium: Torrijos; Referee: Comorera

19 January 1928 Play-off 1	Racing de Madrid	0–4	Real Madrid	Madrid
		Report	Gual 40'; JM Peña; Luís Uribe; Quesada	Stadium: Estadio Metropolitano; Referee: Vallana

22 January 1928 Play-off 2	Real Madrid	1–3	Athletic Madrid	Madrid
	Quesada 48'	Report	L. Olaso 10'; Cosme ?'; Adolfo 81'	Stadium: Estadio Chamartín; Referee: Comorera

=== Copa del Rey ===
==== Qualifying round ====
31 January 1928 First leg	Real Madrid	7–0	Patria FC	Madrid
	Muñagorri; Gual 35'; L. Uribe 40'; Muñagorri, 60'; F. Pérez 75'; Muñagorri	Report		Stadium: Estadio Chamartín; Referee: Espinosa

2 February 1928 Second leg	Real Madrid	3–1	Patria FC	Madrid
	Féliz Pérez 15'; Moraleda ?', 30'	Report	Terrero 75'	Stadium: Estadio Chamartín; Referee: Espinosa

==== Group stage ====
Pos	Team	Pld	W	D	L	GF	GA	GD	Pts
1	CD Alavés (Q)	10	5	4	1	17	9	+8	14
2	Real Madrid (Q)	10	6	2	2	23	17	+6	14
3	Racing de Santander	10	6	1	3	34	13	+21	13
4	Athletic Bilbao	10	6	1	3	26	13	+13	13
5	Gimnástica de Torrelavega	10	1	2	7	8	38	-30	4
6	Athletic de Madrid	10	1	0	9	12	30	-18	2

	ATH	ATM	ALA	GIM	RAC	RMA
Athletic Bilbao		3–1	0–0	8–0	3–1	3–1
Athletic de Madrid	2–4		1–3	3–2	1–4	0–1
CD Alavés	2–0	2–1		3–0	2–1	0–1
Gimnástica de Torrelavega	1–3	2–1	0–0		0–5	2–2
Racing de Santander	2–0	6–2	2–2	7–0		4–0
Real Madrid	3–2	3–0	3–3	6–1	3–2	

5 February 1928 1	Real Madrid	6–1	Gimnástica de Torrelavega	Madrid
	L. Uribe 4'; Quesada 9'; Moraleda 59'; L. Uribe 61', 72'	Report	Telete 38'	Stadium: Estadio Chamartín; Referee: Espinosa

12 February 1928 2	Racing de Santander	4–0	Real Madrid	Santander
		Report		Stadium: El Sardinero; Referee: Cruella

19 February 1928 2	Athletic Madrid	0–1	Real Madrid	Madrid
		Report	Gual 40'	Stadium: Estadio Metropolitano; Referee: Barrera

26 February 1928 4	Real Madrid	3–2	Athletic Bilbao	Madrid
	Gual 53', 78'; L. Uribe 65'	Report	Suárez 28', 30'	Stadium: Estadio Chamartín; Referee: Lloveras

4 March 1928 5	Real Madrid	3–3	CD Alavés	Madrid
	Quesada 53'; F. Pérez 76'; Gual 80'	Report	García 38'; Modesto 46'; Unamuno 66'	Stadium: Estadio Chamartín; Referee: Ledesma

11 March 1928 6	Gimnástica de Torrelavega	2–2	Real Madrid	Torrelavega
	Capillas 22', 54'	Report	Urquizu 71', 82'	Stadium: Cantabria; Referee: Pelayo Serrano

18 March 1928 7	Real Madrid	3–2	Racing de Santander	Madrid
	Quesada 58'; Urquizu 65'; L. Uribe 80'	Report	Óscar 55'; Lope Peña 87' (o.g.)	Stadium: Estadio Chamartín; Referee: Cruella

25 March 1928 8	Real Madrid	3–0	Athletic Madrid	Madrid
	Luis Uribe 25'; Gual 30'; Del Campo 50'	Report		Stadium: Estadio Chamartín; Referee: Peris

1 April 1928 9	Athletic Bilbao	3–1	Real Madrid	Bilbao
	Suárez 10'; Ayarza 17'; Martínez 46' (o.g.)	Report	Esparza 74'	Stadium: San Mamés; Referee: Villalta

8 April 1928 10	CD Alavés	0–1	Real Madrid	Vitoria-Gasteiz
		Report	Lope Peña 10'	Stadium: Mendizorroza; Referee: Ledesma

==== Quarter-finals ====
15 April 1928 First leg	Real Madrid	2–2	Valencia CF	Madrid
	Del Campo 8'; Lope Peña 16'	Report	Félix Pérez 65' (o.g.); Rey 70'	Stadium: Estadio Chamartín; Referee: Saracho

29 April 1928 Second leg	Valencia CF	2–1	Real Madrid	Valencia
	Ródenas 9', 25'	Report	Luis Uribe 76'	Stadium: Mestalla; Referee: Saracho

=== Copa Federación Centro ===
7 June 1928 Final	Real Madrid	3–0	Athletic Madrid	Madrid
	Gaspar Rubio 1'; Quesada 10' (pen.); Cominges ?'	Report		Referee: Gárate
