= 1926–27 Real Madrid CF season =

25th season in existence of Real Madrid CF

Real Madrid
1926–27 season
- President: Luis de Urquijo
- Manager: Pedro Llorente (interim); Santiago Bernabéu
- Stadium: Estadio Chamartín
- Campeonato Regional Centro (Note: The Campeonato Regional Centro (Central Regional Championship) was a regional league used as a qualifier for the Copa del Rey.): 1st
- Copa del Rey: Semi-finals
- Top goalscorer: League: Luis Uribe (17); All: Luis Uribe (28)
- Biggest win: CE Europa 1–8 Real Madrid
- Biggest defeat: CE Europa 4–1 Real Madrid
| Home colours | Away colours |

The 1926–27 season was Real Madrid Club de Fútbol's 25th season in existence. The club played some friendly matches. They also played in the Campeonato Regional Centro (Central Regional Championship) and the Copa del Rey.

== Players ==
Note: Flags indicate national team as defined under FIFA eligibility rules; some limited exceptions apply. Players may hold more than one non-FIFA nationality.

| No. | Pos. | Nation | Player |
|---|---|---|---|
| — | GK | ESP | Cándido Martínez |
| — | GK | ESP | Antonio Castro |
| — | DF | ESP | Félix Quesada |
| — | DF | ESP | Juan Urquizu |
| — | DF | ESP | Patricio Escobal |
| — | DF | ESP | Luis de Uribe |
| — | DF | ESP | Lope Peña |
| — | DF | ESP | Ramón de Uribe |
| — | DF | ESP | José María de Benguria |
| — | MF | ESP | Manuel Prats |
| — | MF | ESP | Ricardo Zarauz Ugalde |
| — | MF | ESP | José María Peña |

| No. | Pos. | Nation | Player |
|---|---|---|---|
| — | MF | ESP | Ernesto Mejía |
| — | MF | ESP | Rafael Lozano |
| — | MF | PUR | Eduardo Ordóñez |
| — | MF | ESP | Miguel Álvarez García |
| — | FW | ESP | Gerónimo del Campo |
| — | FW | ESP | Félix Pérez |
| — | FW | ESP | Francisco Moraleda |
| — | FW | ESP | José María Muñagorri |
| — | FW | ESP | José Menéndez |
| — | FW | ESP | Juan Monjardín |

== Friendlies ==
| 25 July 1926 Friendly | Deportivo de La Coruña | 7–3 | Real Madrid | A Coruña |
| | | Report | | Stadium: Estadio Riazor; Referee: De Paz |

| 26 July 1926 Friendly | Celta de Vigo | 6–1 | Real Madrid | Santiago de Compostela |
| | | Report | | Stadium: Santa Isabel |

| 29 July 1926 Friendly | Deportivo de La Coruña | 5–1 | Real Madrid | A Coruña |
| | | Report | | Stadium: Estadio Riazor |

| 1 August 1926 Friendly | Celta de Vigo | 8–2 | Real Madrid | Vigo |
| | | Report | | Stadium: Coya |

| 3 August 1926 Friendly | Selección de Vigo | 4–3 | Real Madrid | Vigo |
| | | Report | | Stadium: Coya |
Note: Selección de Vigo was a team made up of players from Celta de Vigo and other clubs based in Vigo.

| 5 September 1926 Friendly | Real Madrid (Spain) | 4–0 | (Germany) SpVgg Greuther Fürth | Madrid, Spain |
| | | Report | | Stadium: Campo de Ciudad Lineal |

| 13 September 1926 Friendly | Unión SC | 1–1 | Real Madrid | Madrid |
| | | Report | | Stadium: Pardiñas |

| 19 September 1926 Friendly | CD Alavés | 5–2 | Real Madrid | Vitoria-Gasteiz |
| | | Report | | Stadium: Mendizorrotza Stadium |

| 23 September 1926 Friendly | Real Madrid | 4–0 | Sevilla FC | Madrid |
| | | Report | | Stadium: Estadio Chamartín |

| 25 September 1926 Friendly | Real Madrid | 1–4 | Sevilla FC | Madrid |
| | | Report | | Stadium: Estadio Chamartín |

| 27 September 1926 Friendly | Iberia SC | 2–3 | Real Madrid | Zaragoza |
| | | Report | | Stadium: Torrero |

| 1 November 1926 Friendly | Athletic Bilbao | 4–0 | Real Madrid | Bilbao |
| | | Report | | Stadium: Estadio San Mamés |

| 12 December 1926 Friendly | Real Madrid | 4–3 | CD Nacional | Madrid |
| | | Report | | Stadium: Estadio Chamartín |

| 25 December 1926 Friendly | Elche CF | 2–1 | Real Madrid | Elche |
| | | Report | | Stadium: Campo de Altabix |

| 2 February 1927 Friendly | FC Barcelona | 0–0 | Real Madrid | Barcelona |
| | | Report | | Stadium: Les Corts |

| 19 March 1927 Friendly | Real Madrid | 1–5 | FC Barcelona | Madrid |
| | | Report | | Stadium: Estadio Chamartín |

| 20 March 1927 Friendly | Real Madrid | 1–4 | FC Barcelona | Madrid |
| | | Report | | Stadium: Estadio Chamartín |

| 31 March 1927 Friendly | Athletic Madrid | 2–1 | Real Madrid | Madrid |
| | | Report | | Stadium: Estadio Metropolitano |

| 17 May 1927 Friendly | Real Madrid (Spain) | 1–3 | (Scotland) Motherwell F.C. | Madrid, Spain |
| | | Report | | Stadium: Estadio Chamartín |

== Competitions ==
=== Overview ===
| Competition | First match | Last match | Starting round | Final position | Record | | | | | | | |
| Competition | First match | Last match | Starting round | Final position | Pld | W | D | L | GF | GA | GD | Win % |
|---|---|---|---|---|---|---|---|---|---|---|---|---|
| Campeonato Regional Centro | 2 October 1926 | 27 February 1927 | Matchday 1 | Winners | 16 | 12 | 1 | 3 | 38 | 12 | +26 | 75.00 |
| Copa del Rey | 6 March 1927 | 8 May 1927 | Group stage | Semi-finals | 9 | 6 | 0 | 3 | 34 | 17 | +17 | 66.67 |
| Total | | | | | 25 | 18 | 1 | 6 | 72 | 29 | +43 | 72.00 |

Source: Competitions

=== Campeonato Regional Centro ===
==== League table ====
| Pos | Team | Pld | W | D | L | GF | GA | GD | Pts | Qualification |
|---|---|---|---|---|---|---|---|---|---|---|
| 1 | Real Madrid (C, Q) | 16 | 12 | 1 | 3 | 38 | 12 | +26 | 25 | Qualification for the Copa del Rey. |
| 2 | Athletic Madrid (Q) | 16 | 8 | 2 | 6 | 31 | 25 | +6 | 18 | Qualification for the Copa del Rey. |
| 3 | Racing Madrid | 16 | 8 | 1 | 7 | 33 | 25 | +8 | 17 | |
| 4 | RS Gimnástica | 16 | 4 | 2 | 10 | 15 | 41 | −26 | 10 | Qualification for the relegation play-offs |
| 5 | Unión SC | 16 | 4 | 2 | 10 | 18 | 32 | −14 | 10 | Qualification for the relegation play-offs |

Source: Rec.Sport.Soccer Statistics Foundation
Rules for classification: 1) points; 2) goal difference; 3) number of goals scored.
(C) Champions; (Q) Qualified for the phase indicated

==== Matches ====
| 2 October 1926 1 | Real Madrid | 6–0 | RS Gimnástica | Madrid |
| | L. Uribe; Quesada; Monjardín; L. Uribe 56' | Report | | Stadium: Estadio Chamartín; Referee: Espinosa |

| 10 October 1926 2 | Real Madrid | 3–2 | Unión SC | Madrid |
| | Quesada 25'; L. Uribe 30'; Monjardín 44' | Report | Lozano ?'; Carrasco 75' | Stadium: Union; Referee: Montero |

| 17 October 1926 3 | Real Madrid | 0–1 | Athletic Madrid | Madrid |
| | | Report | Triana 85' | Stadium: Estadio Chamartín; Referee: Triana |

| 24 October 1926 4 | Real Madrid | 6–1 | Racing de Madrid | Madrid |
| | L. Uribe; Quesada; L. Uribe; Monjardín; L. Uribe | Report | Ateca 85' | Stadium: Estadio Chamartín; Referee: Adrados |

| 6 November 1926 5 | RS Gimnástica | 1–5 | Real Madrid | Madrid |
| | Ibáñez | Report | L. Uribe 20', 30', ?'; Monjardín 46'; F. Serrano (o.g.) | Stadium: Estadio Metropolitano; Referee: Melcón |

| 14 November 1926 6 | Unión SC | 0–2 | Real Madrid | Madrid |
| | | Report | Felix Pérez 20'; Pepín Menéndez 35' | Stadium: Unión; Referee: Vilalta |

| 28 November 1926 7 | Athletic Madrid | 1–3 | Real Madrid | Madrid |
| | Ortiz 35' | Report | Monjardín 10'; L. Uribe 25', 78' | Stadium: Estadio Metropolitano; Referee: Vilalta |

| 8 December 1926 8 | Racing de Madrid | 0–1 | Real Madrid | Madrid |
| | | Report | Monjardín 4' | Stadium: Racing; Referee: Pelayo Serrano |

| 25 December 1926 9 | Real Madrid | 1–0 | RS Gimnástica | Madrid |
| | Moraleda 15' | Report | | Stadium: Estadio Chamartín; Referee: Aracho |

| 2 January 1927 10 | Real Madrid | 1–0 | Unión SC | Madrid |
| | Moraleda 65' | Report | | Stadium: Union; Referee: Saracho |

| 9 January 1927 11 | Real Madrid | 1–1 | Athletic Madrid | Madrid |
| | S. Bernabéu 20' | Report | Tuduri 85' | Stadium: Estadio Chamartín; Referee: Vallana |

| 22 January 1927 12 | Real Madrid | 2–0 | Racing de Madrid | Madrid |
| | L. Uribe 16', 70' | Report | | Stadium: Estadio Chamartín; Referee: Vilalta |

| 30 January 1927 13 | RS Gimnástica | 1–3 | Real Madrid | Madrid |
| | Azurza 46' | Report | L. Uribe 8'; JM Peña 44'; Félix Pérez 65' | Stadium: Gimnástica; Referee: Vilalta |

| 13 February 1927 14 | Unión SC | 0–3 | Real Madrid | Madrid |
| | | Report | Ordóñez; Lope Peña; Del Campo | Stadium: Unión; Referee: Benito Alonso |

| 19 February 1927 15 | Athletic Madrid | 2–1 | Real Madrid | Madrid |
| | Palacios 5', 7' | Report | L. Uribe 32' | Stadium: Estadio Metropolitano; Referee: Vallana |

| 27 February 1927 16 | Racing de Madrid | 2–0 | Real Madrid | Madrid |
| | | Report | | Stadium: Racing; Referee: Pelayo Serrano |

=== Copa del Rey ===
==== Group stage ====
| Pos | Team | Pld | W | D | L | GF | GA | GD | Pts | Qualification |
|---|---|---|---|---|---|---|---|---|---|---|
| 1 | Real Madrid (Q) | 4 | 3 | 0 | 1 | 20 | 9 | +11 | 6 | Advance to knockout phase |
| 2 | Sevilla FC | 4 | 3 | 0 | 1 | 21 | 6 | +15 | 6 | |
| 3 | CD Extremeño | 4 | 0 | 0 | 4 | 7 | 33 | −26 | 0 | |

Source: Leyenda Blanca
Rules for classification: 1) points; 2) tiebreaker match
(Q) Qualified for the phase indicated

| 6 March 1927 1 | Real Madrid | 9–4 | CD Extremeño | Madrid |
| | L. Uribe 7', 44'; Benguría 40', 43', 49', 65', 73'; Mejía 41'; Félix Pérez 89' | Report | Murube 48'; Capdevila 54'; Cabezas 70', 83' | Stadium: Estadio Chamartín; Referee: Menchaca |

| 13 March 1927 2 | Sevilla FC | 2–1 | Real Madrid | Seville |
| | Brand 28', 69' (pen.) | Report | L. Uribe 23' | Stadium: Campo de la Reina Victoria; Referee: Quintana |

| 27 March 1927 3 | CD Extremeño | 1–7 | Real Madrid | Badajoz |
| | Virel 23' | Report | Félix Pérez 4'; JM Peña 40'; Félix Pérez; L. Uribe 52'; Lope Peña; L. Uribe; Muñagorri 89' | Stadium: Santa Marina; Referee: Melcón |

| 3 April 1927 4 | Real Madrid | 3–2 | Sevilla FC | Madrid |
| | Quesada 19' (pen.); Benguría 60'; Quesada 75' (pen.) | Report | Leoncito 7'; León 35' | Stadium: Estadio Chamartín; Referee: Saracho |

| 10 April 1927 1st place tiebreaker | Real Madrid | 3–1 | Sevilla FC | Badajoz |
| | Quesada 51' (pen.); Benguría 66'; Ocaña 73' (o.g.) | Report | Carreño 63' | Stadium: Santa Marina; Referee: Latorre |

==== Quarter-finals ====
| 17 April 1927 First leg | Real Madrid | 2–0 | CE Europa | Madrid |
| | Luis Uribe 26', 78' | Report | | Stadium: Estadio Chamartín; Referee: Menchaca |

| 24 April 1927 Second leg | CE Europa | 4–1 | Real Madrid | Barcelona |
| | Bestit 26', 83'; Pelao 49' (pen.); Alcázar 52' (pen.) | Report | Luis Uribe 58' | Referee: Fausto Martín |

| 1 May 1927 Tiebreaker | Real Madrid | 8–1 | CE Europa | Zaragoza |
| | Moraleda 30', 60', 89'; Luis Uribe 40', 63', 87'; Félix Pérez 43', 75' | Report | Corbella 50' | Stadium: Torrero; Referee: Saracho |

==== Semi-finals ====
| 8 May 1927 Semifinal | Real Unión | 2–0 | Real Madrid | Zaragoza |
| | | Report |
