= 1928–29 Real Madrid CF season =

27th season in existence of Real Madrid CF

Real Madrid
1928–29 season
- President: Luis de Urquijo
- Manager: José Berraondo
- La Liga: 2nd
- Campeonato Regional Centro (Note: The Campeonato Regional Centro (Central Regional Championship) was a regional league used as a qualifier for the Copa del Rey.): 1st
- Copa del Rey: Runners-up
- Top goalscorer: League: Gaspar Rubio (13); All: Gaspar Rubio (23)
Home colours	Away colours

The 1928–29 season was Real Madrid Club de Fútbol's 27th season in existence, and their first in the Primera División, the top flight of Spanish football. The club also played in the Campeonato Regional Centro (Central Regional Championship) and the Copa del Rey.

== First-team squad ==
Note: Flags indicate national team as defined under FIFA eligibility rules; some limited exceptions apply. Players may hold more than one non-FIFA nationality.

No.	Pos.	Nation	Player
—	GK	ESP	Rafael Vidal
—	GK	ESP	José María Cabo
—	DF	ESP	Félix Quesada (captain)
—	DF	ESP	Juan Urquizu
—	DF	ESP	Luis de Uribe
—	DF	ESP	Lope Peña
—	MF	ESP	Manuel Prats
—	MF	ESP	Desiderio Esparza
—	MF	ESP	José María Peña

No.	Pos.	Nation	Player
—	MF	ESP	Francisco López
—	MF	ESP	Rafael Lozano
—	MF	ESP	Rafael Morera
—	FW	ESP	Gerónimo del Campo
—	FW	ESP	Ramón Triana
—	FW	ESP	Gaspar Rubio
—	FW	ESP	José Cañavera
—	FW	ESP	Juan Monjardín
—	FW	ESP	Jaime Lazcano

== Transfers ==
=== In ===
Pos	Player	From
GK	(Spain) Rafael Vidal	(Spain) Unión Sporting
GK	(Spain) José María Cabo	(Spain) Levante
MF	(Spain) Rafael Morera	(Spain) Tenerife
FW	(Spain) Ramón Triana	(Spain) Deportivo
FW	(Spain) Gaspar Rubio	(Spain) Levante
FW	(Spain) José Cañavera	(Spain) Gimnástica Valencia
FW	(Spain) Jaime Lazcano	(Spain) Osasuna

== Friendlies ==
Kick Off	Opponents	H / A	Result	Scorers
1928-07-01	(Spain) Albacete	A	0–2	
1928-09-06	(Spain) Unión Sporting	A	6–2	
1928-09-09	(Spain) Real Unión	H	4–4	Rubio 20', Cominges 21', 80', De Uribe 40'
1928-09-12	(Spain) Cartagena	N	9–0	Rubio (3), Cominges (2), Morera (2), Lazcano (1), Quesada (1) (pen)
1928-10-09	(Spain) Atlético	N	4–1	Rubio (2), Lazcano (2)
1928-10-12	(Spain) Atlético	N	2–2	Rubio 80', 85'
1929-05-09	(Spain) Imperio	N	0–2	
1929-05-12	(Spain) Unión Sporting	N	3–0	
1929-05-12	(Spain) Arenas SC	H	2–0	
1929-05-16	(Spain) Elche	H	2–6	Álvarez 28', Moriones 30'

== Competitions ==
=== Overview ===
Competition	First match	Last match	Starting round	Final position	Record							
Competition	First match	Last match	Starting round	Final position	Pld	W	D	L	GF	GA	GD	Win %
Campeonato Regional Centro	16 September 1928	25 November 1928	Matchday 1	Winners	8	7	1	0	30	8	+22	87.50
Copa del Rey	9 December 1928	3 February 1929	Round of 32	Runners-up	9	8	0	1	44	9	+35	88.89
La Liga	10 February 1929	23 June 1929	Matchday 1	2nd	18	11	1	6	40	27	+13	61.11
Total					35	26	2	7	114	44	+70	74.29

Source: Competitions

=== La Liga ===
==== League table ====
Pos	Team	Pld	W	D	L	GF	GA	GD	Pts
1	Barcelona (C)	18	11	3	4	37	23	+14	25
2	Real Madrid	18	11	1	6	40	27	+13	23
3	Athletic Bilbao	18	8	4	6	47	34	+13	20 (Note: Athletic Bilbao finished ahead of Real Sociedad on head-to-head points: Athletic Bilbao–Real Sociedad 4–2, Real Sociedad–Athletic Bilbao 1–1.)
4	Real Sociedad	18	8	4	6	46	41	+5	20
5	Arenas	18	8	3	7	33	43	−10	19

Source: BDFútbol
Rules for classification: 1) points; 2) head-to-head points; 3) head-to-head goal difference; 4) goal difference; 5) number of goals scored.
(C) Champions

==== Matches ====
Kick Off	Opponents	H / A	Result	Scorers
1929-02-10	Europa	H	5–0	Lazcano 50', 59', 75', 83', Morera 63'
1929-02-17	Barcelona	A	2–1	Morera 10', 55'
1929-02-24	Atlético	H	2–1	Triana 37', 53'
1929-03-03	Real Sociedad	H	2–1	Lazcano 9', Morera 37'
1929-03-10	Racing de Santander	A	3–1	Rubio 57', 68', Cañavera 82'
1929-03-24	Español	A	0–4	
1929-03-31	Real Unión	H	2–0	Rubio 32', 40'
1929-04-07	Arenas	A	2–3	Rubio 11', 75'
1929-04-21	Athletic Bilbao	H	5–1	Lozano 5', Morera 39', Lazcano 59', Blasco 68' (o.g.), Rubio 76'
1929-04-28	Europa	A	2–5	Rubio 22', López 30'
1929-05-09	Barcelona	H	0–1	
1929-05-19	Real Sociedad	A	4–5	Del Campo 20', Rubio 57', 60, Lozano 75'
1929-05-26	Racing de Santander	H	2–2	Lozano 60', Lazcano 77'
1929-05-30	Atlético	A	3–0	Peña 25', Rubio 28', Del Campo 84'
1929-06-02	Español	H	2–0	Rubio 28', Triana 44'
1929-06-09	Real Unión	A	2–0	Rubio 9', Peña 50'
1929-06-16	Arenas	H	2–0	Quesada 18' (pen), Triana 83'
1929-06-23	Athletic Bilbao	A	0–2	

=== Campeonato Regional Centro ===
==== League table ====
Pos	Team	Pld	W	D	L	GF	GA	GD	Pts	Qualification
1	Real Madrid (C, Q)	8	7	1	0	30	8	+22	15	Qualification for the Copa del Rey.
2	Athletic Madrid (Q)	8	6	0	2	23	14	+9	12	Qualification for the Copa del Rey.
3	Racing Madrid (Q)	8	2	1	5	13	18	−5	5	Qualification for the Copa del Rey.
4	Nacional Madrid	8	2	0	6	16	25	−9	4	Qualification for the relegation play-offs
5	Unión SC	8	2	0	6	17	34	−17	4	Qualification for the relegation play-offs

Source: Rec.Sport.Soccer Statistics Foundation
Rules for classification: 1) points; 2) goal difference; 3) number of goals scored.
(C) Champions; (Q) Qualified for the phase indicated

==== Matches ====
Kick Off	Opponents	H / A	Result	Scorers
1928-09-16	Unión Sporting	N	5–2	Rubio 7', 8', 85', De Uribe 76', Lazcano 84'
1928-09-23	Racing de Madrid	H	4–1	De Uribe 20', 51', López 74', Rubio 85'
1928-10-07	Atlético	A	2–0	Rubio 60', Morera 75'
1928-10-14	Nacional	A	4–3	Lope Peña 15', Peña, Urquizu 84', Lazcano 87'
1928-10-28	Unión Sporting	A	4–0	De Uribe 10', 30', Morera 35', 88'
1928-11-04	Racing de Madrid	A	1–1	Morera 15'
1928-11-18	Atlético	H	3–1	Rubio, Triana 44', De Uribe 55'
1928-11-25	Nacional	H	7–0	Rubio (3), De Uribe (2), Lazcano (2)

=== Copa del Rey ===
Round	Kick Off	Opponents	H / A	Result	Scorers
R1 First Leg	1928-12-09	Real Oviedo	H	5–0	Triana 10', De Uribe 19', Morera 24', Lazcano 37', 54'
R1 Second Leg	1928-12-16	Real Oviedo	A	4–2	Rubio 20', 25', 50', Lazcano 30'
R2 First Leg	1928-12-23	Logroño	H	8–0	Morera 6', 73', 80', Rubio 11', 32', Quesada 24' (pen), Triana 40', 81'
R2 Second Leg	1928-12-30	Logroño	A	5–0	Rubio 14', Lazcano 25', Morera 26', De Uribe 44', 69'
QF First Leg	1929-01-06	Racing de Madrid	H	3–1	Triana 22', Rubio 35', Morera 46'
QF Second Leg	1929-01-12	Racing de Madrid	A	6–2	Quesada 9' (pen), De Uribe 38', 43', 87', Rubio 40', Morera 70'
SF First Leg	1929-01-20	Athletic Bilbao	H	3–1	Triana 23', De Uribe 50', Rubio 58'
SF Second Leg	1929-01-27	Athletic Bilbao	A	4–1	Triana 49', 87', Rubio 57', Lazcano 83'
Final	1929-02-03	Español	N	1–2	Lazcano 75'
