= Real Madrid CF's 1927 tour of the Americas =

1927 football tour of Real Madrid to the Americas

Real Madrid's 1927 tour of the Americas
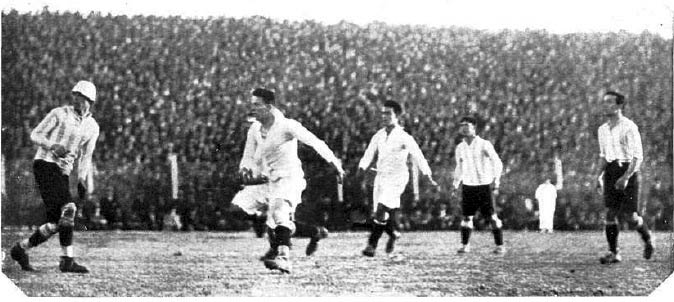
- Real Madrid facing a team of players from Buenos Aires on 10 July
- Date: 7 or 9 July (Note: The RSSSF and El Mundo report the date of the first match as 7 July, while Marca and Leyenda Blanca report the date as 9 July.) – 24 September 1927
- Duration: 2 months and 15 or 17 days
- Venue: Various
- Location: Argentina Uruguay Peru Cuba Mexico United States
- Type: Exhibition games
- Theme: Association football
- Participants: Real Madrid

Between July and September 1927, Spanish football club Real Madrid embarked on an exhibition tour of the Americas, with the aim of promoting Spanish football across both continents. It was one of the first football exhibition tours to be played across two different continents.

During the tour, Real Madrid played 16 matches, including five in Argentina, one in Uruguay, two in Peru, one in Cuba, six in Mexico, and one in the United States. Additionally, it's also reported that the team travelled to Chile during the tour, but no matches were played there.

== Background ==
Since 1904, several British football clubs had done tours of South America, primarily in Argentina, Brazil, and Uruguay. In September 1914, Italian club Torino became the first non-British team to do a tour of South America, playing matches in São Paulo and Buenos Aires. Meanwhile, the first Spanish team to tour the continent was made up of players from clubs in Gipuzkoa in 1922, including from Athletic Bilbao, Real Sociedad, Arenas Club, and Real Unión.

By 1927, Real Madrid had done two exhibition tours of their own, including in Italy during December 1920 and January 1921, and across Europe (specifically England, France, and Denmark) in August and September 1925.

== The tour ==
The tour was organized by club director José García Echaniz, under the presidency of Luis de Urquijo, with the goal of promoting Spanish football across the Americas. This was considered unusual for the time and created a lot of expectation around the tour.

Real Madrid arrived in Barcelona on 15 June, and were supposed to leave the following day, but a delay gave them the opportunity to watch FC Barcelona face a team from Brussels at Les Corts. Eventually, the team departed Barcelona on the SS Giulio Cesare, and spent 18 days at sea before arriving in Argentina. While on their journey, the team encountered a storm off the coast of Uruguay.

=== South America ===
The team arrived in Buenos Aires in early July, without any of their friendlies being finalized. Additionally, it was reported in Spain that the promoter for the American part of the tour had fled the country after being accused of fraud. Around the time they arrived in Argentina, the Royal Spanish Football Federation fined Madrid 1,000 pesetas because of the tour, and warned them that they were solely responsible for anything that happened while in the Americas.

Real Madrid played their first match of the tour on 9 July 1927, (Note: Both the RSSSF and El Mundo report the date of the match as 7 July.) where they drew 0–0 against a team made up of players from Buenos Aires at the Estadio Sportivo Barracas, which included 1934 FIFA World Cup winner Raimundo Orsi. On 10 July, the match was repeated with the Argentinians winning 3–2, with both teams observing a minute of silence prior to halftime for the victims of a railway accident in Alpatacal on 7 July. It took Real Madrid until their third match of the tour to get a win, when they beat Boca Juniors 2–1 on 16 July, before they lost 4–0 to Newell's Old Boys in Rosario the next day.

The team then travelled to Uruguay, to face Peñarol, who had recently returned from their own tour of Europe. On 24 July, in front of a crowd of 12,000 people at the Estadio Pocitos in Montevideo, Real Madrid drew 0–0 with the Uruguayan team. Following the match, a journalist for Uruguayan newspaper El País called it the worst match they had seen in 20 years. Afterwards, they returned to Buenos Aires to face Racing Club, where they lost 2–0.

Following the loss to Racing Club, the team left for Peru, where they arrived on 10 August through the Port of Callao aboard the steamship Santa Ana. The team were welcomed to Peru by a large crowd of fans, alongside Peruvian Football Federation president Alejandro Garland and directors Pedro Ureta and J. Fitzgerald. While in Peru, the team stayed at the Gran Hotel Bolívar. Real Madrid played two matches in Peru, against teams of players from both Callao and Lima at the Estadio Nacional, with the Peruvian Football Federation deciding the order of the matches. On 14 August, prior to Madrid's match against the team from Callao, an exhibition match between Atlético Chalaco and Alianza Lima was played, with Alianza Lima winning 2–0. Shortly after, Real Madrid beat the Callao team 4–1, with Madrid dominating most of the match. Following the match, the Spanish ambassador to Peru presented the team with the Municipal Cup trophy.

The second match on 15 August saw the attendance of several notable figures, including the mayor of Lima Andrés Fernando Dasso Hoke, Peruvian Olympic Committee president Leónidas Gonzales, and miliary commander Tomás Pizarro, as well as the added stakes of a trophy that had been donated by Spanish king King Alfonso XIII. Midway through the first half, the referee paused the match as Peruvian president Augusto B. Leguía arrived. In the end, Madrid drew 1–1 with team from Lima, with the Spanish team getting the trophy and Santiago Bernabéu receiving a silver shield from Andrés Dasso. Afterwards, the idea of a third match in Lima was given, against either Circolo Sportivo Italiano or Association FBC, but the plan never went through.

=== North America ===
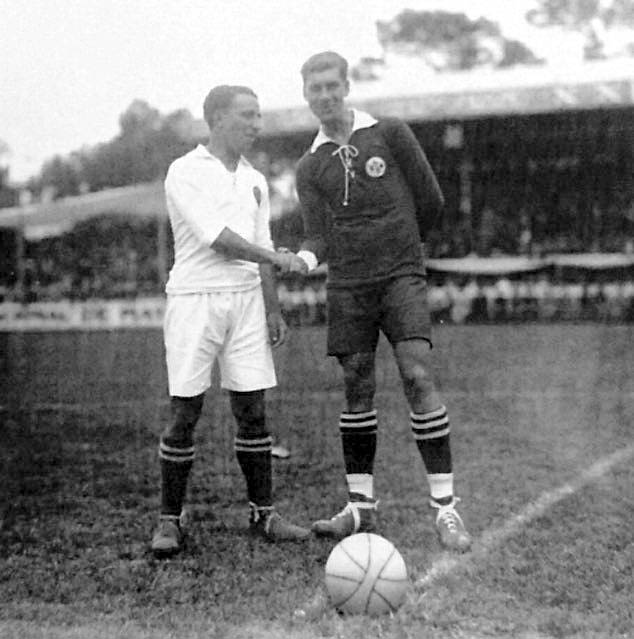
Félix Quesada and Mexican defender Rafael Garza Gutiérrez right before Real Madrid faced Club América in September 1927.

After beating Juventud Asturiana 2–1 in Cuba on 28 August, Real Madrid arrived in Mexico in early September. Initially, they arrived and docked at the Port of Progreso in Yucatán. However, due to the boat being anchored far from the port, José María Peña and Juan Urquizu both decided to get into a small boat and row through the port's shark-infested waters. However, when trying to return to the ship, Peña slipped off the rope he was using to climb back on and fell into the water near the sharks. José María Muñagorri almost jumped in to help him, and had to be held back by his teammates, but in the end, nearby sailors managed to get Peña to safety.

Real Madrid played six matches in Mexico, with all of them being at the Parque España in Mexico City. The first match in Mexico saw them win 4–2 against Club América on 4 September, with both Luis Cerrilla and Madrid captain Félix Quesada being ejected from the match. Afterwards, they faced Club Asturias, Real Club España, Atlante, and Club Necaxa, winning all four matches. Prior to their match against Necaxa, the players heard gunshots and assumed a revolution was going on, although it later turned out to be people celebrating Mexican Independence Day.

Real Madrid's final match in Mexico saw them face Club América again, this time with Atlante forward Juan Carreño featuring as a guest player for América. Real Madrid won 5–3, but the match was not without controversy, as José María Muñagorri was ejected for getting into a fight with a spectator. Additionally, the Madrid players did not accept the trophy offered to them after the match, citing the 'excessive roughness' of the Club América players.

In the United States, Madrid were originally scheduled to face two teams: Brooklyn Wanderers and Galicia SC. They also tried to schedule other matches prior to leaving Mexico, including against Chicago Sparta and Indiana Flooring, but by the time the team left, they were only set to play Brooklyn Wanderers. During this part of the tour, the team was sponsored by Nat Agar, who owned the Brooklyn Wanderers and had scheduled other foreign team's visits to the United States. However, Agar instead gave Real Madrid's American match to Galicia, while the team were en route to New York. The day prior to the match, the players were invited to an honorary dinner at the Hotel Pennsylvania in Manhattan. In total, only 5000 people attended the match on 24 September, as Real Madrid drew 1–1 with Galicia, with former Spanish diplomat Rafael Casares y Gil, who was the ambassador of Spain to Romania between 1907 and 1908, in attendance. Following the match, the New York Times called Real Madrid "A Spanish team" in their headline, and said that 'Galicia were the better team in the first half, but the Spaniards found their rhythm later'.

== Players ==
The team Real Madrid brought for the tour was missing several players, including Cándido Martínez, who stayed behind for his upcoming wedding, and Juan Monjardín, whose family refused to release him for the tour. To make up for this, they brought players from other clubs, including the likes of Travieso from Athletic Bilbao, José Maria Yermo from Arenas Club, and both Juan Urquizu and José Gurucharri from Osasuna. Santiago Bernabéu, who had retired at the end of the 1926–27 season, also travelled with the team.

During the tour, two changes were made to the team. Prior to the match against Juventud Asturiana, they were joined by goalkeeper Oliván and forward Félix Pérez, who departed A Coruña on 20 July to join the team's North American leg of the tour. And following the match against Real Club España, Manuel Vidal and José Gurucharri left to rejoin their respective teams in Spain.

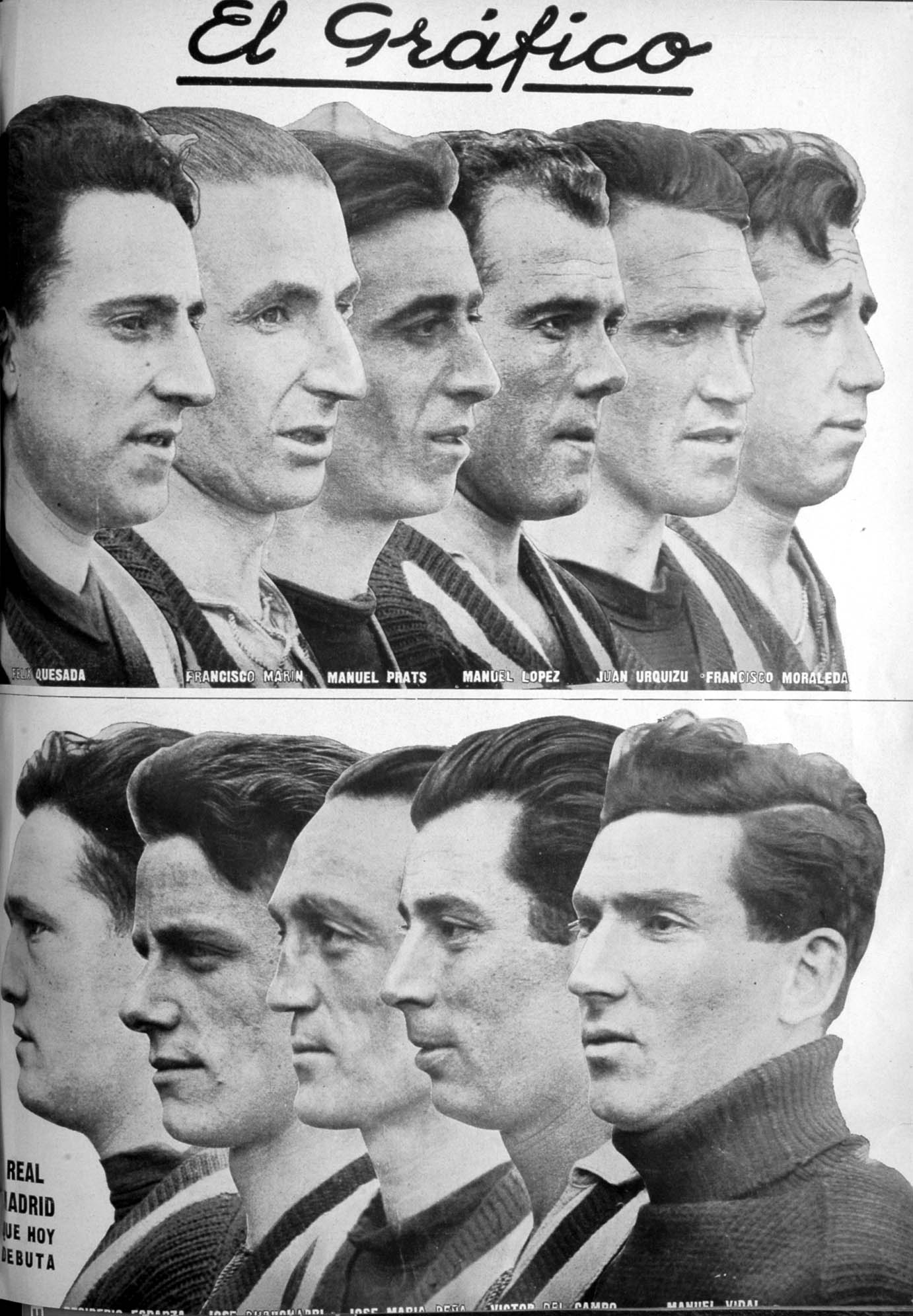
Real Madrid players that were part of the tour.

=== Squad ===
Manager: Pedro Llorente

Note: Flags indicate national team as defined under FIFA eligibility rules; some limited exceptions apply. Players may hold more than one non-FIFA nationality.

No.	Pos.	Nation	Player
—	GK	ESP	Oliván
—	GK	ESP	Manuel Vidal (from Athletic Bilbao)
—	DF	ESP	Patricio Escobal
—	DF	ESP	Félix Quesada (captain)
—	DF	ESP	Juan Urquizu (from CA Osasuna)
—	MF	ESP	Desiderio Esparza
—	MF	ESP	José María Peña
—	MF	ESP	Lope Peña
—	MF	ESP	Pachuco Prats (from Real Murcia)
—	MF	ESP	Monchín Triana (from Athletic Madrid)

No.	Pos.	Nation	Player
—	FW	ESP	Gerónimo del Campo
—	FW	ESP	José Gurucharri (from CA Osasuna)
—	FW	ESP	Luis Marín (from Athletic Madrid)
—	FW	ESP	Pepín Menéndez
—	FW	ESP	Francisco Moraleda
—	FW	ESP	José María Muñagorri
—	FW	ESP	Félix Pérez
—	FW	ESP	Travieso (from Athletic Bilbao)
—	FW	ESP	José Maria Yermo (from Arenas Club)

== Matches ==
9 July 1927 Friendly	Combinado Buenos Aires (Argentina)	0–0	(Spain) Real Madrid	Buenos Aires, Argentina
		Report		Stadium: Estadio Sportivo Barracas; Referee: Servando Pérez (Argentina)
Note: Combinado Buenos Aires was made up of players from teams in Buenos Aires.

10 July 1927 Friendly	Combinado Buenos Aires (Argentina)	3–2	(Spain) Real Madrid	Buenos Aires, Argentina
	Carricaberry 18', 90'; Calandra 56'	Report	Triana 15', 66'	Stadium: Estadio Sportivo Barracas; Referee: José Calli (Argentina)
Note: Combinado Buenos Aires was made up of players from teams in Buenos Aires.

16 July 1927 Friendly	Boca Juniors (Argentina)	1–2	(Spain) Real Madrid	Buenos Aires, Argentina
	Tarasconi 65'	Report	Gurucharri 8', 12'	Stadium: Estadio Sportivo Barracas; Referee: Nai Foino (Argentina)

17 July 1927 Friendly	Newell's Old Boys (Argentina)	4–0	(Spain) Real Madrid	Rosario, Argentina
	Aguirre 13'; Francia 47', 70'; Libonatti 60'	Report		Stadium: El Coloso; Referee: Servando Pérez (Argentina)

24 July 1927 Friendly	Peñarol (Uruguay)	0–0	(Spain) Real Madrid	Montevideo, Uruguay
		Report		Stadium: Estadio Pocitos; Attendance: 12,000; Referee: Mengler (Uruguay)

30 July 1927 Friendly	Racing Club (Argentina)	2–0	(Spain) Real Madrid	Buenos Aires, Argentina
	Miguel 34'; Rey 55'	Report		Stadium: Estadio Racing Club; Referee: Juan P. Barbera (Argentina)

14 August 1927 Friendly	Selección Chalaca (Peru)	1–4	(Spain) Real Madrid	Lima, Peru
	Saldarriaga (pen.)	Report	Gurucharri 9', 40'; Triana 50' (NA)	Stadium: Estadio Nacional; Referee: Artemio Serra (Peru)
Note: Selección Chalaca was made up of players from Atlético Chalaco, Unión Buenos Aires, and Sportivo Tarapacá Ferrocarril.

15 August 1927 Friendly	Combinado Limeño (Peru)	1–1	(Spain) Real Madrid	Lima, Peru
	Villanueva 9' (pen.)	Report	Gurucharri 6' (Note: Depor report the goal was an own goal by Carlos Moscoso.)	Stadium: Estadio Nacional; Referee: Alberto Benites (Peru)
Note: Combinado Limeño was made up of players from Alianza Lima, Circolo Sportivo Italiano, and Association FBC.

28 August 1927 Friendly	Juventud Asturiana (Cuba)	1–2	(Spain) Real Madrid	Havana, Cuba
	Gacha 14'	Report	Félix Pérez 63'; Triana 77'	Stadium: Almerades Park; Referee: Francisco Rodríguez

4 September 1927 Friendly	Club América (Mexico)	2–4	(Spain) Real Madrid	Mexico City, Mexico
	Sota 12'; Garces	Report	Travieso 20', 25' (NA); Félix Pérez	Stadium: Parque España; Referee: Mercadé (Mexico)

8 September 1927 Friendly	Club Asturias (Mexico)	0–6	(Spain) Real Madrid	Mexico City, Mexico
		Report	Gurucharri 20', 30' del Campo; Lope Peña 52'; Félix Pérez	Stadium: Parque España; Referee: Jardón (Mexico)

11 September 1927 Friendly	Real Club España (Mexico)	2–8	(Spain) Real Madrid	Mexico City, Mexico
	Giralt; Suárez	Report	Lope Peña 6', 13' (NA); Félix Pérez 25' del Campo; Muñagorri; Travieso	Stadium: Parque España; Referee: Clifford (Mexico)

14 September 1927 Friendly	Club Atlante (Mexico)	1–4	(Spain) Real Madrid	Mexico City, Mexico
	Pérez	Report	Lope Peña del Campo	Stadium: Parque España; Referee: Roldán (Mexico)

16 September 1927 Friendly	Club Necaxa (Mexico)	0–5	(Spain) Real Madrid	Mexico City, Mexico
		Report	Travieso 6'; Menéndez 34'; Muñagorri del Campo (pen.)	Stadium: Parque España; Referee: Núñez Cortina (Mexico)

18 September 1927 Friendly	Club América (Mexico)	3–5	(Spain) Real Madrid	Mexico City, Mexico
	Contreras; Carreño; Sota	Report	Menéndez; Lope Peña; Félix Pérez; Moraleda	Stadium: Parque España; Referee: Friedrich (Mexico)
Note: Atlante F.C. forward Juan Carreño featured as a guest player for Club América.

24 September 1927 Friendly	Galicia SC (United States)	1–1	(Spain) Real Madrid	New York City, United States
	Vega 14' (pen.)	Report	Travieso 68'	Stadium: Hawthorne Field; Attendance: 5000; Referee: C.E. Greighton (United States)

== Post-tour ==
When Real Madrid returned to Spain, they competed in the Torneo de Campeones, a competition involving the six teams that had won the Copa del Rey by that point, which served as a rehearsal for the creation of La Liga in 1929. Additionally, they signed Pachuco Prats, who had been brought in from Real Murcia for the tour, on a permanent transfer for 20,000 pesetas.

The next time Real Madrid returned to the Americas was in 1952, as part of another exhibition tour which included the inaugural Small Club World Cup in Venezuela.

This tour also marked the last time Real Madrid faced Club América until 83 years later in 2010, when Madrid beat them 3–2 in San Francisco.

== See also ==
- Club Nacional de Football's 1927 tour of North America, another football tour in the same year
