= Copa Federación Centro =

Spanish football tournament

- Organiser(s): Castilian Federation
- Founded: 6 May 1923
- Abolished: 1953
- Region: Central Spain
- Teams: 4 to 8 teams
- Last champions: (Community of Madrid) UD San Lorenzo (1st title)
- Most championships: (Community of Madrid) Real Madrid (4 titles)

The Copa Federación Centro (English: Center Federation Cup), or the Castilian Federation Cup, was a football competition contested by the best clubs from Central Spain (which encompassed Madrid and the wider Castile region). It was the second-tier competition for the said region after the Campeonato Regional Centro. The competition was formed and reformed numerous times in its 20-year-history between 1923 and 1943, going from a knock-out format to a league mode of all against all. Throughout the editions, the Castilian Cup took different names. Its first version was known as the Copa Madrid (1923–1928), then it developed into the Copa Castilla (1933–1934), and Copa Presidente de la Federación Castellana (1940–1944). Its first edition was organized in 1923 by the Castilian Federation and the last was in 1953 under the same name. The Castilian Federation Cup had five known editions, although it is probable that there are others, such as Copa Primavera (1941–1943) and Copa José Luis del Valle (1943–1945).

Great figures played at this tournament, such as Santiago Bernabéu, Monchín Triana, René Petit, and José María Peña.

== 1922–23 Copa Federación Centro ==
The first edition of this competition was held between 6 May and 17 June 1923 in Madrid and was contested by all the Madrid teams in a single-match knock-out tournament under the denomination of Copa Federación Centro (also known at the time as the Copa Madrid). After the first two knockout rounds, Athletic de Madrid and Real Madrid reached the final that took place on 17 June at the newly-opened Estadio Metropolitano.

In the first half, Madrid scored twice through crosses from Gerónimo del Campo and strikes from Santiago Bernabéu, helped in the second by a mistake by Pololo, but the hosts fought back and equalized shortly after courtesy with two quick goals, a header from Monchín Triana and a free kick launched by Luis Olaso. This served as a wake-up call for the Madrid team, who responded with a relentless wave of attacks on Athletic's goal, who failed to resist, conceding four more goals: A superb shot by Posada broke the tie, and after this, Antonio de Miguel, Bernabéu and Posada sealed the game. Thus Real Madrid won the cup.

=== Results ===
Quarter-finals
6 May 1923
Sociedad Gimnástica | 1
Real Madrid | 3
13 May 1923
Racing de Madrid | 6
Unión Sporting Club (Madrid) | 0
13 May 1923
Athletic de Madrid | 9
Sociedad Primitiva Amistad | 0
20 May 1923
AD Ferroviaria | ?
GC Ciudad Lineal | ?

Semi-finals
31 May 1924
Real Madrid | 3
Racing de Madrid | 1
31 May 1924
Athletic de Madrid | 7
AD Ferroviaria | 0

Final
17 June 1923
Real Madrid | 6
Athletic de Madrid | 2

=== Final ===
17 June 1923

| Real Madrid | 6–2 | Athletic de Madrid |
|---|---|---|
| Bernabéu; Posada; De Miguel | Report | Triana; Olaso |

Estadio Metropolitano, Madrid
Attendance: 12,000
Referee: (Castile and León) Sr. Chopeitia

Real Madrid line-up: Martínez; Escobal, Quesada; Sicilia, Mengotti, Mejía; De Miguel, Posada, Bernabéu, Pérez, Del Campo.

Athletic line-up: Ortueta; Olalquiaga, Pololo; Fajardo, Burdiel, Marín; Bustillo, Ortiz de la Torre, Triana, Dunwater, Olaso.

== 1927–28 Copa Federación Centro ==
It was a single match disputed by the Regional Championship champion Athletic de Madrid and the runner-up Real Madrid on 7 June 1928 at the Chamartín stadium. The local team won by three goals to nil. The game was organized by the Castilian Football Federation, which also donated the trophy.

=== Results ===
7 June 1928

| Real Madrid | 3–0 | Athletic de Madrid |
|---|---|---|
| Rubio 1'; Quesada 10' (pen.); Cominges 65' | Report |

Estadio Chamartín, Madrid
Referee: Sr. Gárate

Real Madrid line-up: Cabo; Quesada, Urquizu, Prats, Esparza, Peña, Cominges, Pérez, Rubio, López, Benegas.

Athletic line-up: Vidal; Lafuente, A. Olaso, Santos, Ordóñez, Joaquín, De Miguel, Luís Marín, Palacios, Galatas, L. Olaso.

== 1933–34 Copa Castilla ==
The Castilian Cup was organized again for the 1933–34 season under the denomination of Copa de Castilla, as a means to fill a calendar lacking in matches, especially due to the participation of the Spanish national team in the 1934 World Cup held in Italy. It was developed with a phase prior to a single match in which several teams had to be eliminated to reach the final phase in which five teams were automatically classified (Madrid FC, AD Ferroviaria, Athletic de Madrid, CD Nacional de Madrid and the guest Racing de Santander). The final phase consisted of elimination rounds between eight teams, for which the quarterfinals, semifinals and final were played.

It was disputed by clubs from the Castilian Federation (preliminary phase) of the First Category (with the exception of Club Valladolid Deportivo), plus the first three of the Second Category of Madrid and the first two of the North and South sections. The final was played by Athletic Club de Madrid and Club Deportivo Nacional de Madrid, the latter winning by four goals to three.

=== Results ===
==== Previous phase ====
First qualifying round in Madrid:

- SR El Ancora 3–4 RCD Carabanchel
- Imperio CF 1–2 Alcántara Deportiva
- Sporting Vallecano 3–0 AD Tranviaria
- Peña Álvarez - Agrupación Olímpica (Olímpica withdrew)

Second qualifying round in Madrid:

- Alcántara Deportiva 1–0 Sporting Vallecano
- RCD Carabanchel 4–0 Peña Álvarez

First round of Castilla:

- UD Salamanca 2–0 CD Zamora
- SD Española FC - Patria FC (Patria withdrew)

Second round of Castilla:

- UD Salamanca 5–1 SD Española FC

Qualified for the quarterfinals: Sociedad Alcántara, RCD Carabanchel and UD Salamanca.

==== Final phase ====
Quarterfinals; 27 May–3 June
(Community of Madrid) Real Madrid | 1 | 0
(Community of Madrid) AD Ferroviaria | 1 | 7
(Community of Madrid) Athletic de Madrid | 2 | 7
(Community of Madrid) Alcántara Deportiva | 1 | 0
(Community of Madrid) CD Nacional | 4 | 4
(Community of Madrid) RCD Carabanchel | 4 | 1
(Cantabria) Racing de Santander | 6 | 3
UD Salamanca | 0 | 0

Semifinals; 10–17 June
(Community of Madrid) AD Ferroviaria | 1 | 2
(Community of Madrid) Athletic de Madrid | 4 | 1
(Community of Madrid) CD Nacional | 3 | 2
(Cantabria) Racing de Santander | 0 | 3

Final; 24 June
(Community of Madrid) Athletic de Madrid | 3
(Community of Madrid) CD Nacional | 4

=== Final ===
24 June 1934

| CD Nacional (Community of Madrid) | 4–3 | (Community of Madrid) Athletic de Madrid |
|---|---|---|
| Aja (1–0); San Emeterio 13'; Sanz (4–0) | Report | Peña 37'; Losada 55'; Arocha 88' |

Estadio Chamartín, Madrid

CD Nacional line-up: Joven; Muñoz, Suárez; Sánchez, Otero, Zulueta; Sanz, Moriones, López Herranz, San Emeterio, Aja.

Athletic line-up: Pacheco; Corral, Mandaro; Peña, Basterrechea, Losada; Liz, Guijarro, Arocha, Amunárriz, Buiría.

== 1940–41 Copa Presidente Federación Castellana ==
The competition was resumed in 1941, as a means to resume the regional championships in central Spain that had been suppressed after the restructuring of the Royal Spanish Football Federation following the Spanish Civil War. The main reason, however, was the complete consolidation and success of the competitions at the national level. For this reason, it was renamed the Copa Presidente Federación Castellana, having its renewed dispute in the 1940–41 season. The title was disputed by the champion and runner-up of the last Central Regional Championship, the 1939 Mancomunado, who were Athletic-Aviation Club and Real Madrid CF.

The contest was played over two legs; the first on 15 June at the Chamartín Stadium, the second on 22 June at the Vallecas Stadium, where Atlético temporarily played until the reconstruction work of the Metropolitan Stadium was completed (it had been destroyed in the Civil War). Atlético-Aviación was champion of the competition for the first time after a 3–1 aggregate win against its neighbors and historical rivals, Real Madrid, the absolute dominators of the regional tournaments of Castile.

=== Results ===
15 June 1941

| (Community of Madrid) Real Madrid | 1–0 | (Community of Madrid) Athletic-Aviation Club |
|---|---|---|
| Marcial Arbiza 64' | Report1; Report2 |

Estadio Chamartín, Madrid
Referee: Ramón Melcón

22 June 1941

| (Community of Madrid) Athletic-Aviation Club | 3–0 | (Community of Madrid) Real Madrid |
|---|---|---|
| Francisco Arencibia; Campos | Report1; Report2 |

Vallecas Stadium, Madrid
Referee: Manuel Álvarez Corriols

== 1943–44 Copa Presidente Federación Castellana ==
This edition was disputed again by the same contenders from the previous edition, as representatives in the First Division of Castilian football, due to the fact that the Central Regional Championship was no longer disputed. A single match final was played, with Real Madrid winning.

=== Results ===
8 December 1943

| Real Madrid (Community of Madrid) | 5–0 | (Community of Madrid) Athletic de Madrid |
|---|---|---|
| Barinaga 2' 20'; Moleiro 62'; Alonso II 65'; Cuca 88' | Report |

Estadio Chamartín, Madrid
Referee: Sr. Gárate

Real Madrid line-up: Bañón; Querejeta, Corona, Sauto, Tamargo; Huete, Alonso II, Moleiro; Barinaga (Elías 70´), Belmar (Pruden 45´), Cuca.

Athletic line-up: Abel (Caballero 45´); Jimeno, Cobo, Ameztoy, Germán; Machín (García 85´), Domingo, Casaus; Martín, Calixto, Vázquez (Alcalde 45´).

== Champions ==
=== List of winners ===
| Season | Champion | Result | Runner-up | Notes |
Copa Federación Centro (Copa Madrid, 'Copa Castilla, Copa Presidente de la Federación Castellana, Copa Primavera and Copa José Luis del Valle)
| 1922–23 | (Community of Madrid) Real Madrid | 6–2 | (Community of Madrid) Athletic de Madrid | Copa Federación Centro |
| 1927–28 | (Community of Madrid) Real Madrid | 3–0 | (Community of Madrid) Athletic de Madrid | Copa Federación Centro |
| 1933–34 | (Community of Madrid) CD Nacional de Madrid | 4–3 | (Community of Madrid) Athletic de Madrid | Copa Castilla |
| 1939–40 | (Toledo, Spain) CD Toledo | - | (Community of Madrid) - | Copa Primavera |
| 1940–41 | (Community of Madrid) Club Atlético-Aviación | 0–1 and 3–0 | (Community of Madrid) Real Madrid | Copa Presidente Federación Castellana |
| 1941–42 | (Toledo, Spain) CD Toledo | 4–4 and 1–0 | (Community of Madrid) UD Girod | Copa Primavera |
| 1942–43 | (Toledo, Spain) CD Toledo | 2–0 | (Community of Madrid) Rayo Vallecano | Copa Primavera |
| 1943–44 | (Community of Madrid) Real Madrid | 5–0 | (Community of Madrid) Club Atlético-Aviación | Copa Presidente Federación Castellana |
| 1943–44 | (Toledo, Spain) CD Toledo | 2–2 and 5–2 | (Community of Madrid) AD Ferroviaria | Copa José Luis del Valle |
| 1944–45 | (Community of Madrid) Real Madrid | 2–1 | (Community of Madrid) Club Atlético-Aviación | Copa José Luis del Valle |
| 1947–48 | (Community of Madrid) Real Madrid Amateur | ?? | (Province of Ávila) Real Ávila CF | Copa Castilla |
| 1948–49 | (Community of Madrid) Getafe Deportivo | 3–1 | (Community of Madrid) Villaverde San Andrés | Copa Federación Castellana |
| 1949–50 | CD Guadalajara | 3–1 (tie-breaker) | (Community of Madrid) RSD Alcalá | Copa Castilla |
| 1952–53 | (Community of Madrid) UD San Lorenzo | 4–0 and 0–1 | CD Guadalajara | Copa Federación Castellana |

=== Most successful teams ===
Including the Copa Primavera and Copa José Luis del Valle, Real Madrid CF is the most successful team with five titles, followed by CD Toledo with four titles, and with only one title is CD Nacional de Madrid, Club Atlético-Aviación (now Atlético de Madrid), Getafe Deportivo (now Getafe CF), CD Guadalajara and UD San Lorenzo.

| Team | Titles | Runners-up | Year |
|---|---|---|---|
| (Community of Madrid) Real Madrid CF | 4 | 1 | 1922–23, 1927–28, 1943–44, 1944–45 |
| (Toledo, Spain) CD Toledo | 4 | - | 1939–40, 1941–42, 1942–43, 1943–44 |
| (Community of Madrid) Atlético Madrid (Note: Under the donomination of Club Atletico-Aviación.) | 1 | 5 | 1940–41 |
| (Community of Madrid) CD Nacional de Madrid | 1 | - | 1933–34 |
| (Community of Madrid) Real Madrid amateur | 1 | - | 1947–48 |
| (Community of Madrid) Getafe Deportivo | 1 | - | 1948–49 |
| (Castilla–La Mancha) CD Guadalajara | 1 | 1 | 1949–50 |
| (Community of Madrid) UD San Lorenzo | 1 | - | 1952–53 |
