= Ernesto Mejía (footballer) =

Spanish footballer (1899–1933)

Personal information
- Full name: Ernesto Mejía Sáez
- Date of birth: 21 October 1899
- Place of birth: El Escorial, Madrid, Spain
- Date of death: 23 October 1933 (aged 34)
- Place of death: Unknown
- Position: Midfielder

Senior career*
Years	Team	Apps	(Gls)
1921–1927	Real Madrid	51	(1)

International career
1924	Madrid	1	(0)
- * Club domestic league appearances and goals

Ernesto Mejía Sáez (21 October 1899 – 23 October 1933) was a Spanish footballer who played as a midfielder for Real Madrid between 1921 and 1927.

== Playing career ==
=== Club career ===
Born in El Escorial, Madrid, Mejía played his entire football career in his hometown club Real Madrid from 1921 and 1927. Together with the likes of Félix Quesada, José María Muñagorri, Juan Monjardín, and Gerónimo del Campo, he was a member of the great Madrid squad of the 1920s that won five Regional Championships (1921–22, 1922–23, 1923–24, 1925–26, and 1926–27), and reached the final of the Copa del Rey in 1924, in which he started in an eventual 1–0 loss to Real Unión, the courtesy of a goal from José Echeveste.

On 24 May 1923, Mejía started in a friendly match against Dundee United, which ended in a 2–0, thus becoming the first Scottish club to defeat Madrid. In the following month, on 17 June, he started in the final of the 1922–23 Copa Federación Centro, helping his side to a 6–2 win over Atlético Madrid. Four years later, on 17 May 1927, he played in the final of the unofficial 1927 Copa del Rey, coming off the bench to replace José María Muñagorri in an eventual 1–3 loss to Motherwell.

In total, Mejía scored 3 goals in 66 official matches for Madrid, including 2 goals in 27 cup, and 1 goal in 39 regional matches.

=== International career ===
Like many other Real players of that time, Mejía was summoned to play for the 'Centro' (Madrid area) representative team, being a member of the Madrid side that reached the final of the 1923–24 Prince of Asturias Cup, an inter-regional competition organized by the RFEF. He started in the infamous final against Catalonia, which ended in a 4–4 draw, so he was replaced by Juan Caballero for the replay, which Madrid lost 2–3.

== Honours ==
=== Club ===
Real Madrid

- Campeonato Regional Centro:
  - Champions (5): 1921–22, 1922–23, 1923–24, 1925–26, and 1926–27
- Copa del Rey:
  - Runner-up (1): 1924 and 1927 (unofficial)
- Copa Federación Centro:
  - Champions (1): 1922–23

=== International ===
Madrid

- Prince of Asturias Cup:
  - Runner-up (1): 1923–24

== See also ==
- List of Real Madrid CF players
