= Pachuco Prats =

Spanish international footballer and manager (1902–1976)

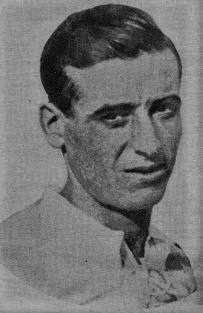

Personal information
- Birth name: Gaudencio Manuel Prats Guerendiaín
- Date of birth: 1 January 1902
- Place of birth: Portugalete, Spain
- Date of death: 22 September 1976 (aged 74)
- Place of death: Baracaldo, Spain
- Position: Midfielder

Senior career*
Years	Team	Apps	(Gls)
1919–1926	Barakaldo		
1926–1927	Real Murcia		
1927–1933	Real Madrid	49	(1)
1933–1935	Alicante		
1935–1936	Barakaldo		

International career
1927–1930	Spain	9	(0)

Managerial career
- 1939–1941: Stadium Club Avilesino
- 1943–1944: Indauchu
- 1944–1945: Constància
- 1945–1947: Barakaldo
- 1948–1949: Lucense
- * Club domestic league appearances and goals

Gaudencio Manuel Prats Guerendiaín, better known as Pachuco Prats (1 January 1902 – 22 September 1976), was a Spanish footballer who played as a midfielder for Real Murcia and Real Madrid between 1927 and 1932. He also played nine matches for the Spain between 1927 and 1930.

He later worked as a manager, taking charge of several Catalan teams in the 1940s.

== Club career ==
=== Real Murcia ===
Born on 1 January 1902 in Portugalete, Biscay, Prats began his football career at Barakaldo, with whom he was crowned interregional champion in 1919, aged 17, and with whom he played for seven years. In 1926, he was signed by Real Murcia, who had been monitoring Catalan and Basque players from second-tier teams, as they were very competitive footballers and their salaries were affordable for the club. He made his debut for Murcia in a friendly match against Levante on 30 June 1926, in which he delivered a performance that convinced Murcia to begin the formalization process of his signing.

Prats quickly established himself as the club's best player, with the chroniclers highlighting his performance in every Murcia game. On 27 March 1927, in a Copa del Rey group stage match against FC Barcelona, he accomplished his task of marking the great Josep Samitier, who was so impressed by his tenacity and relentless pursuit of the ball that he told the national coaches about him, and thus, two weeks later, he was called up for the Spanish national team for the first time. In doing so, he became the first-ever footballer belonging to a club from the Region of Murcia to play for the Spanish national team, with his selection surprisinging many because, at the time, the national coaches would not take into account the players from teams in the south-east of the peninsula, with Spain being usually made up of players from Catalan and Basque clubs, and to a lower degree, players from clubs in Madrid, Galicia and Andalusia.

=== Real Madrid ===
In 1927, Murcia loaned Prats to Real Madrid for its tour of the Americas, playing a total of 12 matches in Argentina, Uruguay, Peru, Cuba, Mexico, and the United States, most notably against the Argentine national team on 9 July, in which he successfully nullified Raimundo Orsi, who went on to score in the 1934 FIFA World Cup final, in an eventual goalless draw. As soon as he arrived in Murcia, Prats informed Murcia that he had reached an agreement with Madrid to sign for them, with Murcia achieving a profit of 17,000 pesetas with the transfer.

In his first season at the club, Prats helped Madrid win both the Madrid Regional Championship and the 1927–28 Copa Federación Centro, starting in the latter's final against Atlético Madrid (3–0). The following season, on 10 February, he was one of the eleven footballers who played in Real's first-ever match in the Spanish top division, helping his side to a 5–0 win over CE Europa. In the following matchday, he started in La Liga's first-ever El Clásico, helping his side to a 2–1 win over Barça.

Together with the likes of Félix Quesada, José María Peña, Jaime Lazcano, and Gaspar Rubio, he was a member of the Madrid squad that reached back-to-back finals in the Copa del Rey in 1929 and 1930, both of which ending in losses to RCD Espanyol (2–1) and Athletic Bilbao (3–2). In the 1931–32 season, Prats played 14 league matches as Madrid won its first-ever La Liga title, finishing the league unbeaten. The following season, Madrid won the league again, but this time, Prats did not play a single league match. He stayed at Madrid for six years, from 1927 to 1933, scoring 1 goal in 117 official matches for Madrid, including 1 goal in 50 La Liga matches, 30 cup matches, and 37 in the regional championship.

=== Later career ===
In 1931, Athletic Bilbao had shown interest in signing him, but the deal collapsed because Madrid asked for 40,000 pesetas for the transfer. When he left the merengue club in 1933, Prats joined Alicante CF, then in the Tercera División, with whom he played for two seasons, until 1935, when he returned to Barakaldo. Prats had an instant impact at Alicante, as the team was crowned champion of its group within one year of his arrival, but they ended up being knocked out from the promotion play-offs by Gerona. Despte not being in good physical condition during his first matches back at Barakaldo, he soon began to stand out again, but his career was then cut short by the outbreak of the Spanish Civil War.

== International career ==
On 17 April 1927, at the end of his first season with Murcia, the 25-year-old Prats made his international debut for Spain, a friendly against Switzerland in Santander, starting alongside four other debutants, including his former Barakaldo teammate Lafuente; Spain won 1–0. The following day, the Catalan press stated that "Prats was undoubtedly the best player in the midfield", with several other notable personality agreeing with this statement, such as the national coaches Manuel de Castro, Ricardo Cabot, and even the secretary of the National Committee of Referees Luis Colina. In the following month, in May, Prats made his second and third appearance for Spain, both friendlies, against France and Italy, and on both matches he once again praised by the press, with Mundo Deportivo stating that he was "the best player on the team, the most consistent, with great determination and effectiveness".

During his time in Madrid, Prats played a further six matches for Spain, including in the famous match against England on 15 May 1929 at the Estadio Metropolitano, where he was one of the five Madrid players who helped Spain achieve a 4–3 victory, thus becoming the first team from Continental Europe to defeat the English. He earned his last international caps for Spain on 30 November 1930, in a friendly Iberian derby against Portugal, helping his side to a 1–0 win.

== Managerial career ==
When the Civil War ended in 1939, Prats was appointed as coach of the second division side Stadium Club Avilesino, a position he held for two years, until 1941. In his second season at the club, Avilés faced Racing de Santander for the first time, winning 1–0, but Prats was replaced midway through the season by Hilario Fernández. During the 1940s, he took charge over several Catalan clubs, such as Indauchu (1943–44), Constància (1944–45), and Barakaldo (1945–47). He was hired by Indauchu at the behalf of its president Luis María Uribe, who had coincided with him at Madrid in the 1928–29 season. He also coached Lucense in 1948–49, and San Fernando.

== Later life ==
Whilst in the capital, Prats opened a bar in Barakaldo in 1931, which he began to run four years later. On 16 May 1969, his former clubs Barakaldo and Madrid faced each other for the so-called "Pachuco Prats Trophy", and after the match, he received a cup from the then Madrid president Santiago Bernabéu.

== Death ==
Prats died on 22 September 1976, at the age of 74.

== Honours ==
Madrid FC

- La Liga:
  - Champions (1): 1931–32
- Copa del Rey
  - Runner-up (2): 1929 and 1930
- Campeonato Regional Centro:
  - Champions (3): 1929–30, 1930–31, and 1931–32
- Copa Federación Centro:
  - Champions (1): 1927–28

== See also ==
- List of Real Madrid CF players
