= Urquizu =

Urquizu is a surname. Notable people with the surname include:

- Esteban Urquizu (born 1981), Bolivian politician
- Juan Urquizu (1901–1982), Spanish footballer
- Luis Urquizu (born 1936), Spanish footballer
- Ignacio Urquizu (November 21, 1978), Spanish politician
