= José María Muñagorri =

Spanish footballer

Personal information
- Full name: José María Muñagorri Berraondo
- Date of birth: 3 October 1902
- Place of birth: Buenos Aires, Argentina
- Date of death: 12 October 1968 (aged 66)
- Place of death: Spain
- Position: Right winger

Senior career*
Years	Team	Apps	(Gls)
1919–1929	Real Madrid		

International career
1923–1924	Madrid	+3	(0)
Medal record
Madrid
Prince of Asturias Cup
Silver medal – second place	1923–24 Prince of Asturias Cup	Team
- * Club domestic league appearances and goals

José María Muñagorri Berraondo (3 October 1902 - 12 October 1968) was a Spanish footballer who played as a forward for Real Madrid. He was one of the many products of Colegio del Pilar, and a historic player of Real Madrid, with whom he played for a whole decade.

== Club career ==
José María Muñagorri was born in Buenos Aires as the son of Basque parents, and at the age of three his family moved to Madrid for professional reasons, and he began to study and to practice football at the Colegio Nuestra Señora del Pilar, which once was one of the capital's football cradles, best known for being a breeding ground for players for Madrid FC in its first years of existence. At the age of only 14, Muñagorri signed up as a member of Madrid FC in 1916 and became part of the youth team that a year later amazed the Spanish capital with its beautiful football, a team which also included, among others, César Sáez, Juan Monjardín and Pedro Escobal, with the latter two reaching the first team of Madrid FC, along with him, during 1919, with the three of them being all minors when they became Real Madrid players.

In one of his first appearances for the club, he netted the winning goal of the decisive match of the 1919–20 Centro Championship against Racing de Madrid, and Racing's goalkeeper and captain Joaquín Pascual, started an angry protest that ended with the invasion of the field by hundreds of fans. Muñagorri played as a right winger and was often described as terrifying by his opponents and mathematical by his teammates, and as such, he played a fundamental role in helping Madrid reach the Copa del Rey final on two occasions (1924 and 1929), both ending in defeats, and he started on the former which they lost 0–1 to Real Unión, courtesy of a goal from José Echeveste.

Muñagorri was a Real Madrid undisputed starter for nearly a decade, however, his career was heavily affected by serious injuries, which interrupted his formidable performances. The most notable being one he suffered in the semifinal of the 1922 Copa del Rey against Real Unión, which kept him out for eight months. When he returned to the field against a Czech team, Muñagorri suffered a new injury to his left leg. His third major injury occurred at the Real stadium, in another semi-final, but this time against Athletic Bilbao in the 1928–29 Copa del Rey, and the last one occurred during a training session at the Ciudad Lineal, which kept him away from football for a year. Muñagorri thus missed both the 1929 final, and without him, Madrid lost 1–2 to RCD Espanyol.

On 17 May 1924, Muñagorri participated in another historic eleven of Real Madrid, the one that opened the Estadio Chamartín on the eve of the 1924 Summer Olympics, in a friendly against Newcastle, netting once in a 3–2 win.

== International career ==
Like many other Real Madrid players of that time, he played several matches for the 'Centro' (Madrid area) representative team, and he was part of the Madrid side that reached the final of the 1923–24 Prince of Asturias Cup, an inter-regional competition organized by the RFEF. Muñagorri did not play in the infamous final against Catalonia which ended in a 4–4 draw, but he started in the replay of the final on 26 February 1924, replacing Antonio De Miguel in a 2–3 loss to their regional rivals.

== The Peña incident ==
During Real Madrid's 1927 tour of the Americas, the team docked in Yucatán, Mexico after leaving Cuba. Because the boat was anchored far from the port, Muñagorri's teammates José María Peña and Juan Urquizu both decided to get into a small boat and row through the port's shark-infested waters. However, when the pair tried to return to the ship, Peña ended up slipping off the rope he was using to climb back on with, and fell into the water near the sharks. Muñagorri almost jumped in to help him, and ended up having to be held back by some of his teammates. In the end, some nearby sailors managed to get Peña to safety.

== Honours ==
=== Club ===
Real Madrid

- Campeonato Regional Centro:
  - Champions (7): 1919–20, 1921–22, 1922–23, 1923–24, 1925–26, 1926–27 and 1927–28
- Copa del Rey:
  - Runner-up (2): 1924 and 1929

=== International ===
Madrid

- Prince of Asturias Cup:
  - Runner-up (1): 1923–24
