= List of Spain national football team hat-tricks =

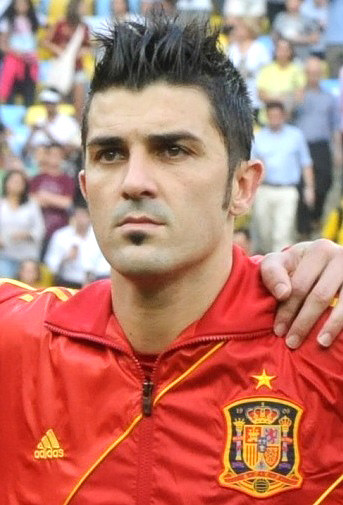
David Villa jointly holds the record for the most hat-tricks scored by a Spanish player, with three

This page is a list of the hat-tricks scored for the Spain national football team. Since Spain's first international association football match in 1920, there have been 43 occasions when a Spanish player has scored three or more goals (a hat-trick) in a game. The first hat-trick was scored by José Luis Zabala against Portugal in 1923. The record for the most goals scored in an international by a Spanish player is six, which has been achieved on one occasion: by Chacho against Bulgaria in 1933.

Fernando Torres and David Villa hold the record for the most hat-tricks scored by a Spanish player, with both having three, with the third of both to have been scored in 2013 Confederations Cup and in same game, against Tahiti, that ended up 10-0. Emilio Butragueño and Míchel are the only Spanish players to have scored a hat-trick at the world cup finals, with Butragueño scoring 4 goals (a poker). David Villa is the only Spanish player to have scored a hat-trick at the European championship finals, against Russia. Fernando Torres is the only Spanish player to have scored two hat-tricks at the confederations cup finals, one in the 2009 edition and the other in the 2013 edition.

== Hat-tricks for Spain ==
No.	Player	Goals	Date	Opponent	Venue	Competition	Result^{[a]}	Ref.
1	José Luis Zabala	3	16 December 1923	Portugal	Reina Victoria, Seville	Friendly	3–0	
2	Juan Errazquin	3	1 June 1925	Switzerland	Neufeld, Bern	Friendly	3–0	
3	José María Yermo	3	30 May 1928	Mexico	Olympic Stadium, Amsterdam	1928 Summer Olympics	7–1	
4	Gaspar Rubio	3	17 March 1929	Portugal	Heliópolis, Seville	Friendly	5–0	
5	Gaspar Rubio (2)	4	14 April 1929	France	Torrero, Zaragoza	Friendly	8–1	
6	Chacho	6	21 May 1933	Bulgaria	Chamartín, Madrid	Friendly	13–0	
7	Julio Elícegui	3	21 May 1933	Bulgaria	Chamartín, Madrid	Friendly	13–0	
8	Isidro Lángara	5	11 March 1934	Portugal	Chamartín, Madrid	1934 FIFA World Cup qualification	9–0	
9	Estanislao Basora	3	19 June 1949	France	Yves-du-Manoir, Colombes	Friendly	5–1	
10	Telmo Zarra	4	18 February 1951	Switzerland	Nuevo Chamartín, Madrid	Friendly	6–3	
11	Alfredo di Stéfano	3	30 January 1957	Netherlands	Nuevo Chamartín, Madrid	Friendly	5–1	
12	László Kubala	3	6 November 1957	Turkey	Nuevo Chamartín, Madrid	Friendly	3–0	
13	Justo Tejada	4	15 October 1958	Northern Ireland	Nuevo Chamartín, Madrid	Friendly	6–2	
14	Vicente Guillot	3	1 November 1962	Romania	Nuevo Chamartín, Madrid	1964 European Nations' Cup qualifying	6–0	
15	Chus Pereda	3	27 October 1965	Republic of Ireland	Ramón Sánchez Pizjuán, Seville	1966 FIFA World Cup qualification	4–1	
16	Santillana	4	21 December 1983	Malta	Benito Villamarín, Seville	UEFA Euro 1984 qualifying	12–1	
17	Hipólito Rincón	4	21 December 1983	Malta	Benito Villamarín, Seville	UEFA Euro 1984 qualifying	12–1	
18	Emilio Butragueño	4	18 June 1986	Denmark	Corregidora, Querétaro City	1986 FIFA World Cup	5–1	
19	José Mari Bakero	3	18 November 1987	Albania	Benito Villamarín, Seville	UEFA Euro 1988 qualifying	5–0	
20	Míchel	3	17 June 1990	South Korea	Friuli, Udine	1990 FIFA World Cup	3–1	
21	Emilio Butragueño (2)	4	19 December 1990	Albania	Ramón Sánchez Pizjuán, Seville	UEFA Euro 1992 qualifying	9–0	
22	Julio Salinas	3	22 September 1993	Albania	Qemal Stafa, Tirana	1994 FIFA World Cup qualification	5–1	
23	Alfonso Pérez	3	4 September 1996	Faroe Islands	Svangaskarð, Toftir	1998 FIFA World Cup qualification	6–2	
24	Julen Guerrero	3	18 December 1996	Malta	National Stadium, Ta' Qali	1998 FIFA World Cup qualification	3–0	
25	Raúl	3	31 March 1999	San Marino	Olímpico, Serravalle	UEFA Euro 2000 qualifying	6–0	
26	Luis Enrique	3	5 June 1999	San Marino	El Madrigal, Villarreal	UEFA Euro 2000 qualifying	9–0	
27	Ismael Urzaiz	3	8 September 1999	Cyprus	Nuevo Vivero, Badajoz	UEFA Euro 2000 qualifying	8–0	
28	Julen Guerrero (2)	3	8 September 1999	Cyprus	Nuevo Vivero, Badajoz	UEFA Euro 2000 qualifying	8–0	
29	Fernando Morientes	3	30 April 2003	Ecuador	Vicente Calderón, Madrid	Friendly	4–0	
30	Fernando Torres	3	12 October 2005	San Marino	Olímpico, Serravalle	2006 FIFA World Cup qualification	6–0	
31	Luis García	3	12 November 2005	Slovakia	Vicente Calderón, Madrid	2006 FIFA World Cup qualification	5–1	
32	David Villa	3	18 June 2008	Russia	Tivoli-Neu, Innsbruck	UEFA Euro 2008	4–1	
33	David Villa (2)	3	9 June 2009	Azerbaijan	Tofiq Bahramov, Baku	Friendly	6–0	
34	Fernando Torres (2)	3	14 June 2009	New Zealand	Royal Bafokeng, Rustenburg	2009 FIFA Confederations Cup	5–0	
35	Roberto Soldado	3	29 February 2012	Venezuela	La Rosaleda, Málaga	Friendly	5–0	
36	Pedro	3	12 October 2012	Belarus	Dinamo Stadium, Minsk	2014 FIFA World Cup qualification	4–0	
37	Fernando Torres (3)	4	20 June 2013	Tahiti	Maracanã, Rio de Janeiro	2013 FIFA Confederations Cup	10–0	
38	David Villa (3)	3	20 June 2013	Tahiti	Maracanã, Rio de Janeiro	2013 FIFA Confederations Cup	10–0	
39	Isco	3	27 March 2018	Argentina	Wanda Metropolitano, Madrid	Friendly	6–1	
40	Ferran Torres	3	17 November 2020	Germany	La Cartuja, Seville	2020–21 UEFA Nations League	6–0	
41	Álvaro Morata	3	8 September 2023	Georgia	Boris Paichadze Dinamo Arena, Tbilisi	UEFA Euro 2024 qualifying	7–1	
42	Mikel Oyarzabal	3	5 June 2024	Andorra	Nuevo Vivero, Badajoz	Friendly	5–0	
43	Mikel Merino	3	7 September 2025	Turkey	Konya Metropolitan Municipality Stadium, Konya	2026 FIFA World Cup qualification	6–0	

== Hat-tricks conceded by Spain ==
No.	Date	Goals	Player	Opponent	Venue	Competition	Result^{[a]}	Ref.
1	29 August 1920	3	Robert Coppée	Belgium	Olympisch Stadion, Antwerp	1920 Summer Olympics	1–3	
2	19 January 1936	3	Josef Bican	Austria	Metropolitano, Madrid	Friendly	4–5	
3	3 June 1956	3	Francisco Palmeiro	Portugal	Jamor, Oeiras	Friendly	1–3	
4	8 May 1957	3	Jackie Mudie	Scotland	Hampden Park, Glasgow	1958 FIFA World Cup qualification	2–4	
5	18 February 1987	4	Gary Lineker	England	Santiago Bernabéu, Madrid	Friendly	2–4	
6	6 September 2006	3	David Healy	Northern Ireland	Windsor Park, Belfast	UEFA Euro 2008 qualifying	2–3	
7	15 June 2018	3	Cristiano Ronaldo	Portugal	Fisht Olympic Stadium, Sochi	2018 FIFA World Cup	3–3	

== See also ==
- David Villa
- Fernando Torres
- Spain national football team
- Spain women's national football team hat-tricks
