= Pepín Menéndez =

Spanish footballer (1907–1971)

Personal information
- Full name: José Menéndez Vicente
- Date of birth: 19 July 1907
- Place of birth: Madrid, Spain
- Date of death: 24 November 1971 (aged 64)
- Position: Forward

Youth career
- –1926: Racing de Madrid

Senior career*
Years	Team	Apps	(Gls)
1926–1928	Real Madrid		
1928	Valencia		
1928–1931	Racing de Madrid	17+	(5+)
- * Club domestic league appearances and goals

José Menéndez Vicente (19 July 1907 – 24 November 1971), also known as Pepín Menéndez, was a Spanish footballer who played as a forward.

== Career ==
Menéndez began his career at Racing de Madrid, before joining Real Madrid in 1926. In 1927, he was included in their squad for the club's 1927 tour of the Americas, where he scored three goals in five appearances, including twice against Necaxa and once against Club América. In total, he made 19 appearances for the club, helping them win the 1926–27 Campeonato Regional Centro title. In June 1928, he went on trial with Valencia for the final matches of the 1927–28 Spanish Football League, although failed to live up the club's expectations, ultimately resulting in him returning to Madrid with Racing de Madrid. There, he scored five goals in 17 matches during the 1929 Segunda División season, as the team was relegated to the Tercera División.

Following his retirement, Menéndez worked as a physical education teacher at a secondary school.
