= Cominges =

Cominges is a surname. Notable people with the surname include:

- Paul Cominges (born 1975), Peruvian former player and football manager
- Juan Cominges (born 1983), Peruvian former professional footballer who played as an attacking midfielder
- Francisco Cominges (1906–1934), Spanish footballer
