= Club Nacional de Football 1927 tour of North America =

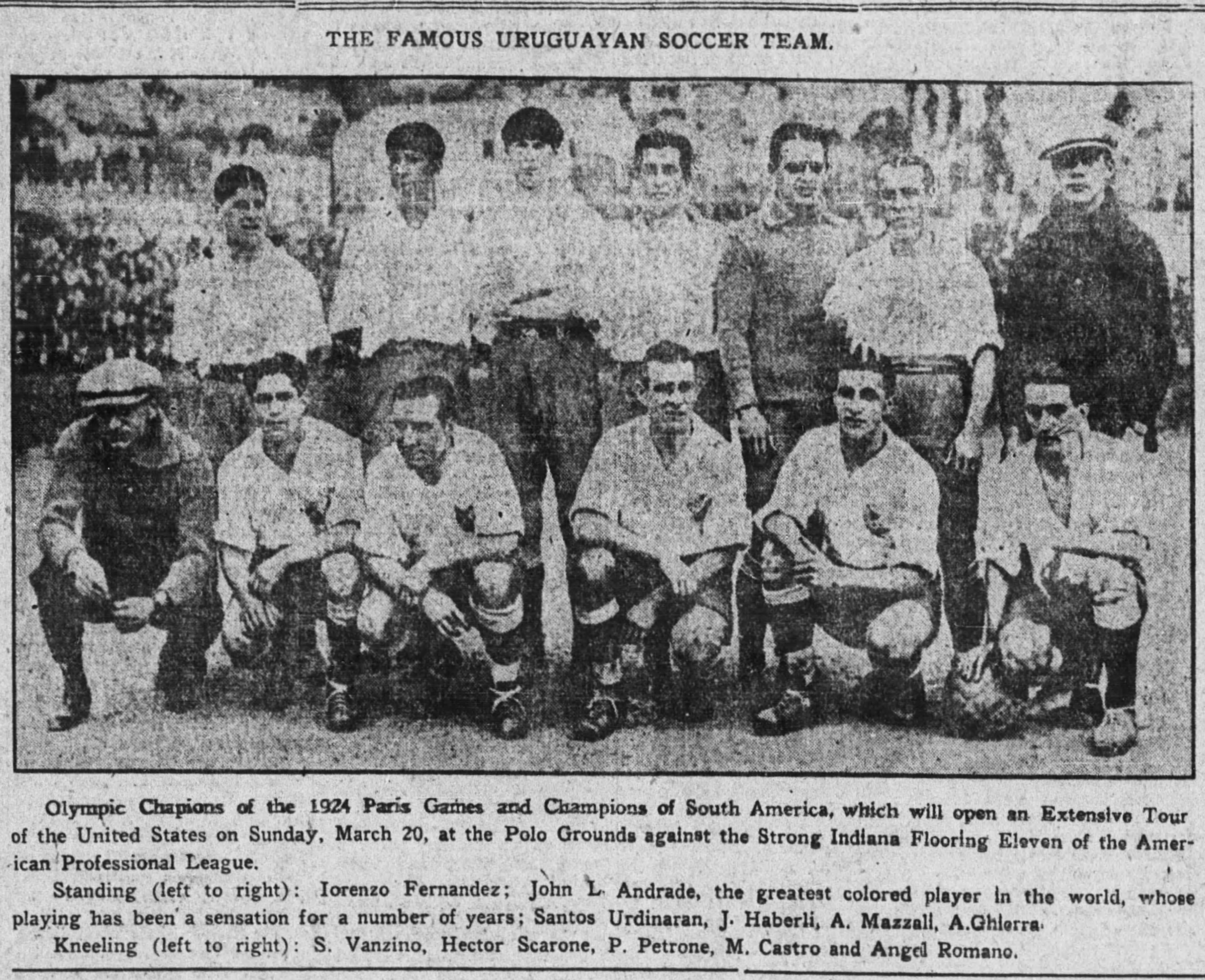
Nacional on its 1927 North American tour, as covered by the New York Age

The 1927 Club Nacional de Football tour of North America covered the United States, Cuba and Mexico. After its successful 1925 European tour, the Uruguayan team received worldwide offers and decided to play another series of friendly matches. The 21-match tour yielded 15 wins, two draws and one loss; three games were cancelled. They scored 75 goals and allowed 20.

== Overview ==
A delegation led by José María Delgado, Rodolfo Gorriti, Jose Richling, and the Uruguayan ambassador to the U.S. left Montevideo in February. Emilio Servetti Mitre was the coach and Juan Kirschberg the physiotherapist. The players were Andrés Mazali, Fausto Batignani, Antonio Urdinarán, Emilio Recoba, José Leandro Andrade, Alfredo Zibechi, José Vanzzino, Lorenzo Fernández, Alfredo Ghierra, Santos Urdinarán, Héctor Scarone, Pedro Petrone, Ángel Romano, Héctor Castro, Zoilo Saldombide, José Pedro Cea, Conrado Haeberli, Diego Fernández, Fortunato Queirolo and the Argentinian Horacio Finamore.

=== U.S. games ===
Nacional's arrival generated enthusiasm, since several players were champions at the Olympics in Paris three years earlier. The fact that José Leandro Andrade was African American evoked support from fans. Association football was not widespread, and their opponents were professional representatives of European countries. The football was violent, comparable to American football. An American said at the beginning of the tour, "We are going to beat them at any price".

The debut was a 6–1 victory over Indiana Flooring before 20,000 spectators. From the beginning the press was surprised by Nacional's play, especially that of Hector Scarone and José Leandro Andrade. The tour's second match, against the Brooklyn Wanderers, ended in a 2–2 draw before 15,000 spectators. The draw was celebrated by the locals, because of Nacional's status as Olympic champions and their past performance. When the game was tied 1–1 Diego Fernández began bleeding from a blow between the eyes, which caused a fight with Morris and Lyall which was stopped by the police. The referee sent Fernández off, and he was replaced by José Andrade.

The next game was against the Newark Skeeters. It was suspended after 20 minutes with Newark leading 1–0 because José Pedro Cea exchanged blows with local player Daley. The fight spread, and almost 500 people charged onto the pitch before the police arrived. Although the referee was willing to continue play, the match was indefinitely suspended to prevent another riot.

The following game was against the American League, with Nacional acclaimed by the spectators after a 4–2 victory; rough play was "absent". Nacional then drew, 1–1, against the Fall River F.C. before a crowd of 7,000. Afterwards, a rematch against the Brooklyn Wanderers was played and the game was eagerly awaited because of the previous game's riot. Nacional won 2–0, and the game was played without incident.

The game against Boston, before 7,000 spectators, was suspended with Boston leading 3–2 because of disturbances on the pitch. After the referee awarded a penalty which was protested by the Nacional players, Boston's McArthur was hit; this led to a brawl of all the players, provoking a pitch invasion of 2,000 people from the stands. The police intervened, leading the Uruguayan players to the locker room and providing a police escort from the stadium. Two Boston players and two women who had entered the pitch in the fight were slightly injured. This, the third fight in seven games, raised doubts that the tour would continue. Uruguayan Consul General Joseph Richling intervened on Nacional's behalf so the tour could continue.

Nacional defeated Detroit 2–1, Cleveland 3–0, St. Louis 4–1 and flamboyant West champions Chicago Sparta 1–0. After four straight wins Nacional requested permission from the United States Football Association to play Hakoah of Austria, who were also touring North America. Although José María Delgado sent a letter to the Association Secretary, he failed to obtain a venue for the game. The following day, Chicago defeated Nacional 3–2. The last two U.S. matches were victories against Philadelphia (4–1) and the Brooklyn Wanderers (2–1).

=== Cuban and Mexican games ===
The tour continued to Cuba and Mexico, with Nacional winning every game. Since the Mexican Colo-Colo tour had been successful, Mexican executives invited Nacional to play several matches. On June 26, 1927, Nacional defeated the Mexico 3–1 and won the Copa General Serrano. They won the Copa Colonia Francesa on June 29, 1927. The tour ended on July 10, 1927, with an 8–1 victory against the Spanish team. Nacional returned to Uruguay to prepare for the 1928 Olympic Games in Amsterdam, where they won a second consecutive Olympic gold medal.

== Results ==
=== Games in the U.S. ===
20 March 1927 1	Indiana Flooring	1:6	Nacional	Polo Ground's
	Leonard		Héctor Castro (3); Héctor Scarone (3)	Attendance: 15,000

26 March 1927 2	Brooklyn Wanderers	2:2	Nacional	Polo Ground's
	Haar; Kelly		Pedro Petrone; Santos Urdinarán	Attendance: 9000

27 March 1927 3	Newark Skeeters	1:0	Nacional	Newark, New Jersey
	Rensen			Stadium: David Stadium; Attendance: 2000; Referee: Harry Waldren

2 April 1927 4	American League Team	2:4	Nacional	Polo Ground's
	Moorhouse; Leonard		Héctor Castro (2); Santos Urdinarán; Héctor Scarone	Attendance: 6000

10 April 1927 5	Fall River F.C.	1:1	Nacional	Fall River
	Rock		Héctor Castro	Attendance: 3500

16 April 1927 6	Brooklyn Wanderers	0:2	Nacional	Ebbetsfield
			Santos Urdinarán; Héctor Castro	Attendance: 6000

19 April 1927 7	Boston Team	3:2	Nacional	Boston
	Ballestina (2); Ballantyne		José Pedro Cea; Héctor Castro	Attendance: 2500

24 April 1927 8	Detroit Team	1:2	Nacional	Detroit
	Visher		Haeberli (2)	Attendance: 2000

1 May 1927 9	Cleveland Team	0:3	Nacional	Luna Park
			Héctor Scarone (3)	Attendance: 3000

8 May 1927 10	Saint Louis Team	1:4	Nacional	St. Louis
	Hart		Héctor Scarone (3); Finamore	Attendance: 4500

15 May 1927 11	Chicago Sparta	0:1	Nacional	Sparta
			Héctor Scarone	Attendance: 4000

22 May 1927 12	Chicago Bricklayers	3:2	Nacional	Chicago's field
	Hill; Mc Lean; Couths		Finamore Saldombide	Attendance: 2500

28 May 1927 13	Philadelphia Team	1:4	Nacional	Philadelphia's field
	Stuart		Pedro Petrone (3); Saldombide	Attendance: 600

30 May 1927 14	Brooklyn Wanderers	1:2	Nacional	Ebbetsfield
	Knorad		Saldombide; José Pedro Cea	Attendance: 10,000

=== Games in Cuba ===
12 June 1927 15	Real Iberia Team-Fortuna	1:4	Nacional	La Habana
	Cosme		Héctor Castro (2); Santos Urdinarán; Haeberli	Attendance: 11,000

16 June 1927 16	Juventud Asturiana	3:2	Nacional	La Habana
	Edelmiro; Tolón; Avelino		Héctor Scarone; Fernández	Attendance: 6000

19 June 1927 17	Spaniard Team-Juventud Asturiana	1:8	Nacional	La Habana
	Gacho		Héctor Scarone (2); Haeberli (3); Héctor Castro (3)	Attendance: 13,000

=== Games in Mexico ===
26 June 1927 18	Mexico	1:3	Nacional
	Contreras		Héctor Scarone; Héctor Castro; Finamore	Attendance: 12,000

29 June 1927 19	Mexico	0:9	Nacional
			Saldombide; José Pedro Cea (2); Haeberli (3); Héctor Scarone; Lorenzo Fernández	Attendance: 8000

3 July 1927 20	Spain	0:5	Nacional
			Héctor Scarone (4); Lorenzo Fernández	Attendance: 15,000

7 July 1927 21	Guerra y Marina	0:4	Nacional
			Héctor Scarone; Lorenzo Fernández; Héctor Castro	Attendance: 4000

10 July 1927 22	Spain	1:8	Nacional
			Héctor Scarone (2); Héctor Castro (3); Finamore; Haeberli; Saldombide	Attendance: 12,000

Statistics
G	W	D	L	GS	GR
21	15	2	4	75	22

== See also ==
- Real Madrid CF's 1927 tour of the Americas, another football tour in the same year
