= José Gurucharri =

Spanish footballer (died 1954)

Personal information
- Place of birth: Corella, Spain
- Date of death: 17 April 1954
- Position: Forward

Senior career*
Years	Team	Apps	(Gls)
–1929	Osasuna	30+	(9+)
1928–1929	Real Zaragoza	15	(6)
1929–1930	Osasuna	27	(13)
- * Club domestic league appearances and goals

José Gurucharri (died 17 April 1954) was a Spanish footballer who plays as a forward.

== Career ==
In 1925, while at Osasuna, Gurucharri competed in an athletics championship in Navarre, where he won gold in the 100 metres event.

In 1927, Gurucharri featured as a guest player for Real Madrid on their tour of the Americas. He was considered one of the star players of the tour, scoring seven goals in 11 matches, including twice against Boca Juniors, Selección Chalaca and Club Asturias. Gurucharri didn't spend the entire tour with Real Madrid, returning to Osasuna following Madrid's 8–2 win against Real Club España.

In 1928, he signed for Real Zaragoza, where he played 15 matches in the 1929 Segunda División Grupo B, scoring six goals. He only spent one season at Zaragoza before returning to Osasuna, where he scored 12 goals in the 1930–31 Tercera División season.
