= Eduardo Ordóñez =

Puerto Rican footballer (1908-1969)

Eduardo Ordóñez Munguira (13 October 1908 – 16 March 1969) was a Puerto Rican footballer who is last known to have played as a midfielder for Atlético Madrid, in addition to having been a Puerto Rican baritone.

== Biography ==
Ordóñez was born in San Juan, Puerto Rico.

Eduardo Ordóñez debuted as a professional footballer in 1926 with the Real Madrid Football Club, where after playing a single season with a presence in the Regional Central Championship and the Spanish Copa Championship, he went to the Athletic in Madrid at the age of 19, where he became the first Puerto Rican footballer to play the Spanish league, after establishing himself in the 1928-29 season. After five years at the club he again went to Madrid Football Club, which lost his monarchical allusion after the establishment of the Second Republic. Again, he only played one season with the whites (three games), and in 1933 he returned to Athletic Madrid to retire as a footballer in 1935.

When he retired from football, he focused on his other great passion, opera. He debuted as a baritone in Bilbao on 1 January 1941. Eduardo Ordóñez's success was apotheotic and the criticism of the time praised the performance of the baritone mattress for possessing a beautiful voice and being a consummate actor. Thus began a brilliant operatic work. In 1959 he was chosen to train the Puerto Rico football team for the VIII Central American and Caribbean Games.

Eduardo Ordóñez died in San Juan, Puerto Rico, on March 16, 1969 at the age of 58.

== Statistics ==
=== Clubs ===
Club	Country	Year	Caps	Goals
Real Madrid F. C.	Spain	1926–27	8	1
Athletic de Madrid	Spain	1927–32	117	8
Madrid F. C.	Spain	1932–33	3	0
Athletic de Madrid	Spain	1933–35	28	0

Fuentes: BDFutbol - Aguanís - InfoAtleti.

=== Coach ===
Club	Country	year
Puerto Rico	Puerto Rico	1959–60

== Post-playing career ==
After retiring from professional football, Ordóñez worked as an opera baritone.

== Death ==
Ordóñez died in 1969.

== Personal life ==
Ordóñez was Puerto Rican of Spanish descent.
