= Manuel Vidal (footballer) =

Spanish footballer

Manuel Vidal Hermosa (15 October 1901 – 17 June 1965) was a Spanish footballer whose position was goalkeeper. He gained his only international cap on 22 May 1927 in a 4–1 friendly win over France at the Stade Olympique Yves-du-Manoir, as an Athletic Bilbao player. He also played for FC Barcelona, Atlético Madrid and Gimnástico FC (Valencia).
