= Francisco Cominges =

Spanish footballer (1906–1934)

Personal information
- Full name: Francisco Cominges Tapias
- Date of birth: 1906
- Place of birth: Vigo, Spain
- Date of death: 19 May 1934 (aged 27)
- Place of death: Madrid, Spain
- Position: Midfielder

Senior career*
Years	Team	Apps	(Gls)
1925–1926	Real Madrid		
1926–1928	Celta de Vigo		
1928–1930	Real Madrid	3	(2)
Total		3	(2)
- * Club domestic league appearances and goals

Francisco Cominges Tapias (1906 – 19 May 1934) was a Spanish footballer who played as a midfielder for Real Madrid and Celta de Vigo in the late 1920s.

== Early life ==
Francisco Cominges was born in the Pontevedra town of Vigo in 1906, (Note: Some sources wrongly claim that he was born in May 1907.) as the son of a director general of customs. He had at least two older brothers, Manuel (1896–1945), who also played for Madrid, and Antonio, an architect who briefly acted as the Municipal Architect of Santiago de Compostela.

== Career ==
Having settled in the Spanish capital during his youth, Cominges began playing friendlies for Real Madrid's lower teams as early as 1919. He played two official matches for Madrid during the 1925–26 season, one in the Copa del Rey and one in the Centro regional championship. Cominges then returned to his hometown, where he played several friendlies with the newly-founded Celta de Vigo, most notably against Espanyol at Coia on 15 August 1927; according to the press at the time, he was one of Celta's standout performers in a 4–2 win. Being noted for his ability to lead a team's midfield, Cominges' technique, vision, and directness allowed him to create dangerous chances for his team.

In 1928, Cominges rejoined Madrid, making his return in the final of the 1927–28 Copa Federación Centro against Atlético Madrid on 7 June, in which he scored his side's third goal in a 3–0 victory. He stayed at Madrid for two years, until 1930, scoring a total of four goals in seven official matches, including 2 goals in four regional championship matches, thus being a member of the Madrid squad who won the Centro championship in 1926, 1929, and 1930.

Cominges made his La Liga debut on 5 January 1930, helping his side to a 6–0 win over Racing de Santander. He scored in his next two appearances, against Atlético and Real Sociedad, both at the Chamartín (4–1 and 1–1, respectively). Despite some encouraging first steps in the Spanish top flight, he never again played there, retiring from football in 1930. During his time in Madrid, he played alongside fellow Vigo native Manuel Posada, and even Santiago Bernabéu.

== Death ==
An engineer, Cominges died in May 1934, at the age of 27.

== Honours ==
Madrid FC

- Copa del Rey:
  - Runners-up (2): 1928–29, 1930
- Copa Federación Centro
  - Champions (1): 1927–28

== See also ==
- List of Real Madrid CF players
