= Luis Urquizu =

Spanish footballer

Personal information
- Full name: Luis María Urquizu Markuerkiaga
- Date of birth: 25 August 1936 (age 90)
- Place of birth: Ondarroa, Spain
- Position: Forward

Senior career*
Years	Team	Apps	(Gls)
1959–1960	Alavés	6	(1)
Total		6	(1)
- * Club domestic league appearances and goals

Luis María Urquizu Markuerkiaga (born 25 August 1936) is a Spanish former footballer who played as a forward.

== Career ==
Born in Ondarroa, Urquizu played as a defender for Alavés.

== Personal life ==
His father Juan was also a footballer.
