= José Cabo =

Spanish footballer and manager

Cabo
Personal information
- Full name: José María Cabo Puig
- Date of birth: 17 July 1907
- Place of birth: Alfara del Patriarca, Valencia, Spain
- Date of death: 10 December 1991 (aged 84)
- Position: Goalkeeper

Youth career
- Reus Deportiu

Senior career*
| Years | Team | Apps | (Gls) |
- Badalona
- Levante
| 1928–1929 | Real Madrid | 9 | (0) |
| 1929–1930 | Atlético Madrid | 17 | (0) |
| 1930–1931 | Espanyol | 6 | (0) |
| 1931–1932 | Catalunya FC | | |
| 1932–1933 | Martinenc | | |
| 1933–1940 | Murcia | | |
| Total | | 32 | (0) |

International career
| 1929–1933 | Catalonia | 6 | (0) |

Managerial career
- 1941–1942: Lleida
- 1945–1947: San Fernando
- 1953–1954: Linense
- Levante
- Real Sociedad
- Deportivo La Coruña
- Córdoba
- Terrassa
- * Club domestic league appearances and goals

José María Cabo Puig (17 July 1907 – 10 December 1991) was a Spanish footballer and manager. He played as a goalkeeper notably for Real Madrid, Atlético Madrid and RCD Espanyol.
