= Pedro Llorente =

Spanish football manager

Pedro Llorente (born 19 October 1897, in Elche, Spain) was a Spanish soccer manager. He coached Real Madrid during 1926–27 period.

== Extra Link ==
- Pedro Llorente on Real Madrid Official site.
