= Francisco Moraleda =

Spanish footballer (1901–?)

Personal information
- Full name: Francisco Moraleda Suárez
- Date of birth: 5 January 1901
- Place of birth: Guadalajara, Spain
- Position: Forward

Senior career*
Years	Team	Apps	(Gls)
1925-1928	Real Madrid	40	(13)
1930–1931	Atlético Madrid	5	(1)

International career
1927	Spain	1	(1)
- * Club domestic league appearances and goals

Francisco Moraleda Suárez (5 January 1901) was a Spanish footballer who played as a forward. As a player, he represented both Real Madrid and Atlético Madrid.

== Club career ==
Born in Guadalajara, he nearly became the first-ever player born in that region to play in La Liga, but when he belonged to Real Madrid (1925–1928), the national league championship had not yet been created (the first season was in 1929), and when he joined Atlético in the 1930–31 season, the team had just been relegated to the Segunda División, so twice Moraleda missed the honor of being the first player from Guadalajara to play in the First Division. In his three years at Real, he helped the club to win three back-to-back regional championships between 1925 and 1928. In 1928, the club's board of directors decided that his low form did not allow him to continue defending Madrid's colors and dismissed him, and eventually Moraleda ended up in the neighboring club, Atlético Madrid.

== International career ==
Moraleda earned one international cap, but with the Spanish B team, in a game held at the Metropolitano on 29 May 1927, against Portugal's A side. Moreover, Moraleda was not even a starter, but he came on after the break and scored the opening goal in an eventual 2–0 win.
