= Lope Peña =

Spanish footballer (1907–1980)

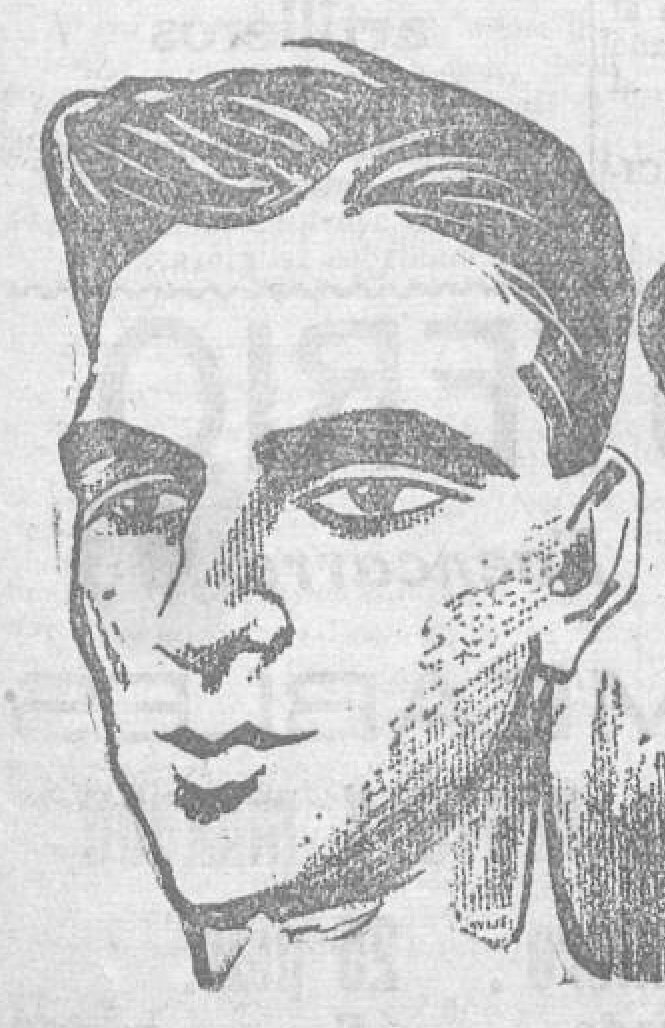

Personal information
- Full name: Lope Peña Gómez
- Date of birth: 21 April 1907
- Place of birth: Madrid, Spain
- Date of death: 22 June 1980 (aged 73)
- Position: Midfielder

Senior career*
Years	Team	Apps	(Gls)
1926–1930	Real Madrid	15	(0)
1930–1931	Racing de Madrid	10	(1)
1931–1932	Madrid FC		
1932–1933	Hércules		
- * Club domestic league appearances and goals

Lope Peña Gómez (21 April 1907 – 22 June 1980) was a Spanish footballer who played as a midfielder.

== Career ==
During Real Madrid's 1927 tour of the Americas, Peña scored eight times, all of them in Mexico, including a hat-trick against Real Club España, two goals against both Club Atlante and Club América, and one goal against Club Asturias. He made a total of 66 appearances for Real Madrid, including 15 in La Liga, as well as winning three Campeonato Regional de Madrid titles.

After joining Racing de Madrid for the 1930–31 Tercera División season, he rejoined Real Madrid (which had been renamed to Madrid FC), where he won the 1931–32 La Liga title. The following season, he returned to the Tercera División with Hércules.
