= Monchín Triana =

Spanish footballer

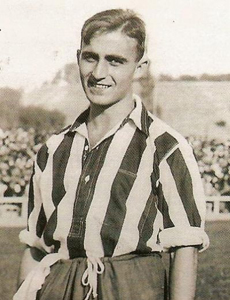

Personal information
- Full name: Ramón Triana y del Arroyo
- Date of birth: 28 June 1902
- Place of birth: Madrid, Spain
- Date of death: 7 November 1936 (aged 34)
- Place of death: Paracuellos de Jarama, Spain
- Position: Midfielder

Senior career*
| Years | Team | Apps | (Gls) |
| 1919–1928 | Athletic Madrid | 75 | (35) |
| 1928–1932 | Real Madrid CF | 25 | (17) |

International career
| 1929 | Spain | 1 | (0) |
| 1922–1931 | Madrid | | |
- * Club domestic league appearances and goals

Monchín Triana (28 June 1902 – 7 November 1936) was a Spanish footballer who played as a midfielder. He is a historical player of both Atlético Madrid and Real Madrid, holding the title of all-time top scorer in the club's history with the former and winning the 1931–32 La Liga with the latter, the first in the club's history.

In his memory, from 1952 to 1968, the Monchín Triana Trophy was awarded annually by the Spanish newspapers MARCA and Arriba to the footballer in the Spanish league who had stood out, throughout his career, for his sportsmanship and for fidelity to the colors of his club.

== Club career ==
Born in Madrid, he began playing football in 1919 with Atlético Madrid, remaining at the club for 9 years and becoming one of the club's great stars its all-time top scorer, until he was surpassed by his teammate Cosme Vázquez in his last season as a rojiblanco. With Atlético, he won three regional championships (in 1921, 1925 and 1928), the first in the club's history, and reached two finals of the Copa del Rey (in 1921 and 1926), both of which were lost against Athletic Bilbao and Barcelona, respectively. It can be said that Triana along with teammate Luis Olaso in the 1920s, contributed to turning Atlético Madrid into an important team in the capital.

With Real Madrid he reached two more finals of the Copa del Rey, in 1929 and 1930. He played in both of them and even scored in the second against Athletic Bilbao, but luck was not on his side and the Whites lost both finals by the minimum margin.

In the League he played twenty games over four seasons, being a starter in the first, and a substitute in the next three, and in his last season with the club he managed to obtain the first league title in the history of Real Madrid in the 1931-32 season. Monchín Triana's role in that historic title was modest, but nonetheless a great performance, since he only played three league games in which he scored three goals.

== International career ==
As a Atlético Madrid player, he was eligible to play for the Madrid national team, and was part of the team that reached the final of the 1923-24 Prince of Asturias Cup, an inter-regional competition organized by the RFEF. Triana scored two goals against Catalonia in the infamous final of the 1923-24 edition, which ended in a 4-4 draw, losing the replay 2-3 two days later.

He played in one match for the Spain national football team in 1929.

== Death ==
Monchín belonged to a well-to-do Catholic family in Madrid. Shortly after the 1936 coup, Republican militiamen showed up at their home claiming Triana and his two brothers, who were on the run. They appeared before the authorities and were imprisoned without trial at the Model Prison in Madrid. During one of the "sacas" carried out by leftist militiamen of the Popular Front on 7 November 1936, Monchín was taken out and shot, as part of the Paracuellos massacres, and his two brothers were also killed.

== Honours ==
=== Club ===
Athletic Madrid

- La Liga (1): 1928–29
- Copa del Rey (4): 1922, 1925, 1926 and 1928

=== International ===
Madrid XI

Prince of Asturias Cup:

- Runner-up (1): 1923-24
