= Gaspar Rubio =

Spanish footballer and coach

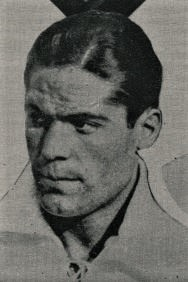

Personal information
- Full name: Gaspar Rubio Meliá
- Date of birth: 14 December 1907
- Place of birth: Serra, Valencia, Spain
- Date of death: 3 January 1983 (aged 75)
- Place of death: Mexico City, Mexico
- Position: Forward

Senior career*
Years	Team	Apps	(Gls)
1926–1927	Gràcia FC	14	(1)
1927–1928	Levante	9	(7)
1928–1932	Real Madrid	34	(30)
1932–1934	Atlético Madrid	25	(10)
1934–1935	Valencia	32	(17)
1939–1940	Real Madrid	4	(2)
1939–1940	Recreativo Granada	14	(5)
1940–1941	Real Murcia	10	(1)
1941–1942	Levante	0	(0)
1942–1943	Recreativo Granada	3	(1)

International career
1920	Spain	4	(9)
- * Club domestic league appearances and goals

Gaspar Rubio Meliá (14 December 1907 – 3 January 1983) was a Spanish football forward and coach.

== Club career ==
Born in Serra, Valencia, Rubio amassed La Liga totals of 61 games and 37 goals over the course of five seasons, representing in the competition Real Madrid (1928–30), Valencia CF (1934–35), Real Murcia (1940–41) and Recreativo Granada (1942–43). With the first club, he netted 72 times in 75 competitive appearances. In 1930–31, he also played briefly in Cuba with Juventud Asturiana and in Mexico with Real Club España.

Nicknamed El rey del astrágalo (King of the astragalus) due to the many ailments he had in that foot bone, Rubio subsequently worked as a manager with several teams – including as player-coach – but never in the top flight. In 1957 he moved to Mexico where he would settle after his retirement from football, coaching Atlante and Toluca.

== International career ==
Rubio gained four caps for Spain in less than one year, scoring nine goals. Seven of those came in his first two appearances, with a hat-trick against Portugal (5–0) and four against France (8–1), thus becoming the first Spanish footballer to score two international hat-tricks. His record remained untouched for more than 60 years, until Emilio Butragueño netted his second international hat-trick on 19 December 1990 against Albania, and remained unbroken for more than 80 years, until both Fernando Torres and David Villa scored their third hat-trick for Spain on 20 June 2013 against Tahiti in a 10-0 win.

Rubio also played a major role in England's first ever loss outside the British Isles, netting twice in a 4–3 triumph in Madrid on 15 May 1929.

== Death ==
Rubio died in Mexico City on 3 January 1983, at the age of 75.
