= Félix Pérez (footballer) =

Spanish footballer (1901–1983)

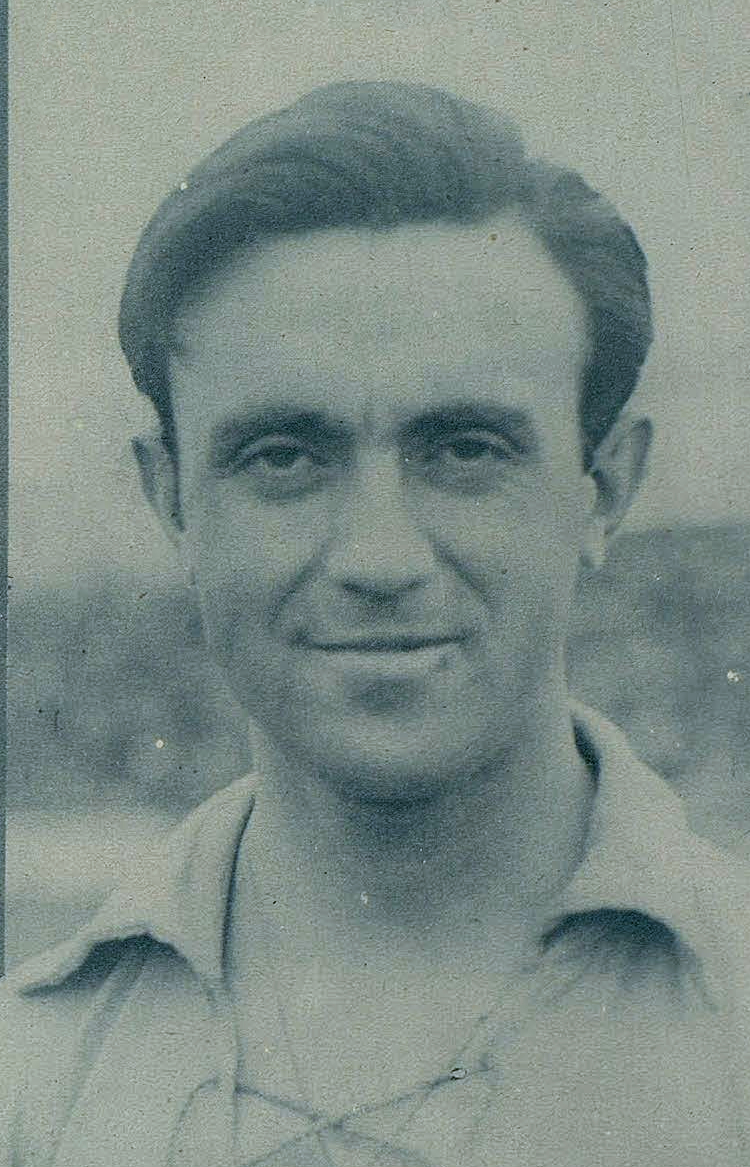

Personal information
- Full name: Félix Pérez Marcos
- Date of birth: 13 June 1901
- Place of birth: Madrid, Spain
- Date of death: 12 September 1983 (aged 82)
- Place of death: Madrid, Spain

Senior career*
Years	Team	Apps	(Gls)
1918–1929	Madrid FC	74	(55)
1918–1920	Racing de Madrid		
1918–1920	Atlético Madrid		

International career
1922–1927	Madrid		
1927	Spain	1	(0)
- * Club domestic league appearances and goals

Félix Pérez Marcos (13 June 1901 – 12 September 1983) was a Spanish footballer.

== Club career ==
At club level, he played for the three main teams in Madrid at the time: Real Madrid, Racing de Madrid and Atlético Madrid.

== International career ==
As a Real Madrid player, he was eligible to play for the Madrid national team, and he was part of the team that reached the final of the 1923-24 Prince of Asturias Cup, an inter-regional competition organized by the RFEF. In that infamous final, it was Félix who opened the scoring after just 8 minutes against Catalonia in an eventual 4–4 draw, losing the replay 2-3 two days later.

He earned just one cap for the Spain national football team, which was against France on 27 May 1927.
