= Juan Urquizu =

Spanish footballer and manager

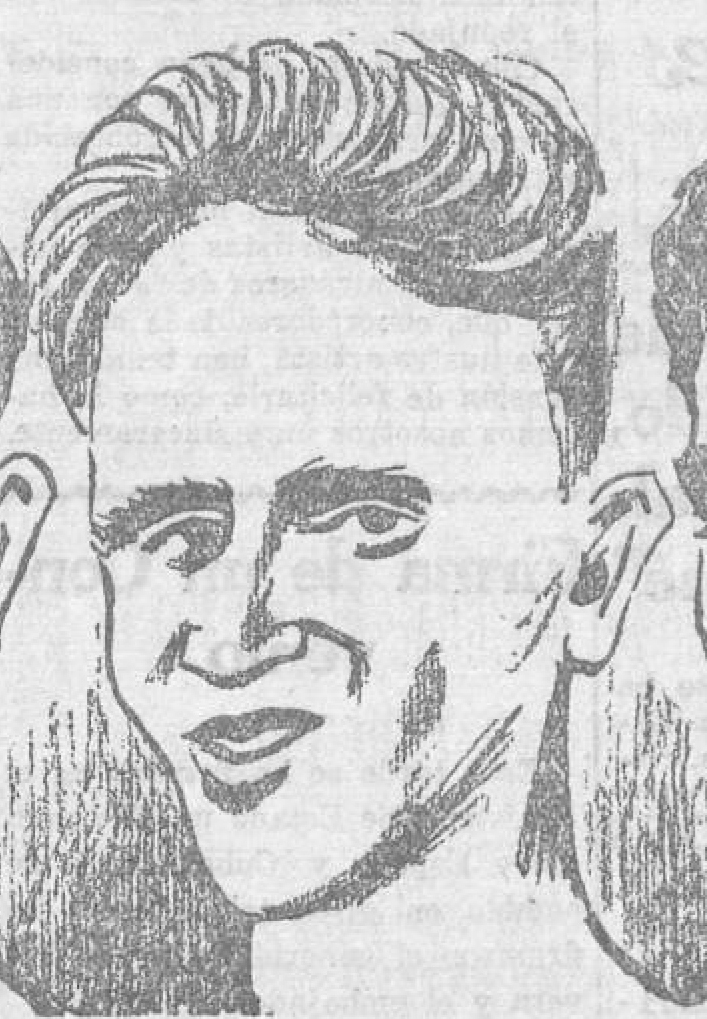
- Urquizu in 1927

Personal information
- Full name: Juan José Urquizu Sustaeta
- Date of birth: 24 June 1901
- Place of birth: Ondarroa, Spain
- Date of death: 22 November 1982 (aged 81)
- Position: Defender

Youth career
- Deusto
- 1916–1917: Erandio

Senior career*
Years	Team	Apps	(Gls)
1917–1927	Osasuna		
1927	Español		
1927–1929	Real Madrid	16	(0)
1929–1935	Athletic Bilbao	69	(0)
1947	Barakaldo	1	(0)
Total		86	(0)

International career
1929	Spain	1	(0)

Managerial career
- 1940–1947: Athletic Bilbao
- 1947: Barakaldo
- 1948–1950: Real Oviedo
- 1950–1952: Barakaldo
- 1952–1954: Real Murcia
- 1956–1958: Levante
- 1962–1963: Ourense
- 1963–1964: Alavés
- * Club domestic league appearances and goals

Juan José Urquizu Sustaeta (24 June 1901 – 22 November 1982) was a Spanish football player and manager.

== Career ==
Born in Ondarroa (Biscay, Basque Country), Urquizu played as a defender for Osasuna, Real Madrid, Athletic Bilbao and Barakaldo. He was capped once by Spain, in 1929.

He managed Athletic Bilbao, Barakaldo, Real Oviedo, Real Murcia, Levante, Ourense and Alavés. He was a La Liga and Copa del Rey winner as both player and coach at Athletic.

== Personal life ==
His son Luis was also a footballer. They are related to footballers Ander Garitano and Gaizka Garitano, the latter of whom also managed Athletic Bilbao.
