= Gerónimo del Campo =

Spanish footballer

Personal information
- Date of birth: 30 September 1902
- Place of birth: Madrid, Spain
- Date of death: 9 August 1967 (aged 64)

International career
Years	Team	Apps	(Gls)
1923	Spain	1	(0)

Gerónimo del Campo (30 September 1902 – 9 August 1967) was a Spanish footballer. He played in one match for the Spain national football team in 1923.
