= Félix Quesada =

Spanish footballer

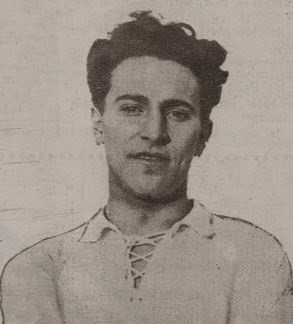

Félix Quesada Mas (1 July 1902 – 9 July 1959) was a Spanish professional association football player. He was born in Madrid, Spain.

He played as a defender spending the entire of his career at Real Madrid C.F. He scored 33 goals in 244 matches for the club.

During his career at the club he won 12 zonal championships, 2 La Liga. He played 9 times for Spain national football team and scored once.

Sporting positions
Preceded by Unknown	Real Madrid C.F. captain Unknown–1936	Succeeded by Quincoces
