= José María Peña =

Spanish footballer and manager

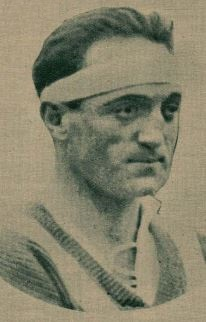
- José María

Personal information
- Full name: Anacleto José María Peña Salegui
- Date of birth: 9 April 1895
- Place of birth: Las Arenas, Spain
- Date of death: 13 January 1989 (aged 93)
- Position: Midfielder

Senior career*
Years	Team	Apps	(Gls)
1915–1926	Arenas		
1926–1932	Real Madrid	53	(2)
1932–1934	Celta Vigo	6	(0)

International career
1921–1930	Spain	21	(1)

Managerial career
- 1932–1935: Celta Vigo
- 1935–1936: Real Oviedo
- 1939–1940: Osasuna
- 1940–1942: Sporting Gijón
- 1942–1943: Arenas
- 1943–1945: Barakaldo
- 1946–1947: Sporting Gijón
- 1947–1948: Gimnástica
- * Club domestic league appearances and goals

Anacleto José María Peña Salegui (9 April 1895 – 13 January 1989) was a Spanish professional football player and manager.

Born in Las Arenas, he started playing football as a midfielder at Arenas Club de Getxo in 1913; teammates included his elder brother Florencio. There he won the Biscay Championship four times and the Copa del Rey in 1919, as well as finishing as a losing finalist 1917 and 1925. In 1926 he moved to Madrid and signed with Real Madrid CF, playing for the club for six years until 1932 and winning four Centre regional championships (also collecting two more runners-up medals from the 1929 and 1930 Copa finals). The team claimed their first La Liga title in 1931–32 but Peña, aged 36 by its conclusion, made only four appearances and it is unclear if he is considered to have won this honour. At international level, he played 21 times for Spain national football team and featured at the 1924 Summer Olympics.

He finished his playing days and started his coaching career at Celta Vigo in the second tier. He was in charge of Sporting Gijón and Arenas in two spells, and had two seasons managing in the top division, one with Real Oviedo in 1935–36, finishing in 3rd place – just before most aspects of normal life were interrupted by the Spanish Civil War – and the other with Sporting (then known as Real Gijón) in 1946–47, finishing 10th of 14 teams.

Peña was also an athlete who won a silver medal in the 400 metres event at the 1918 edition of the Spanish Athletics Championships, while in the 1923 edition he got silver in the Javelin throw and bronze in the 200 metres, 110 metres hurdles and 4 × 400 metres relay. In 1925 he won the gold in 400 metres hurdles and 4 × 400 metres relay, and in 1926 a gold in 110 metres hurdles and bronze in 4 × 400 metres relay.
