= Estadio Metropolitano de Madrid =

Former stadium in Madrid, Spain

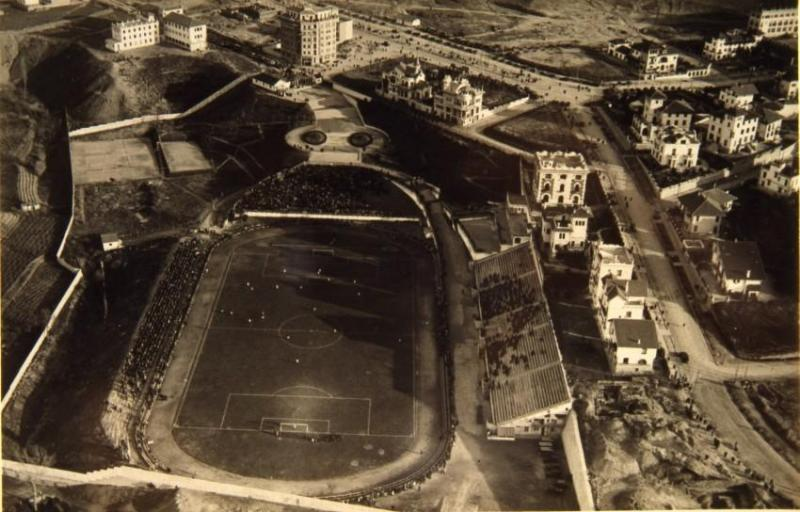
- Stadium Metropolitano Atlético de Madrid 1927
- Interactive map of Estadio Metropolitano de Madrid
- Full name: Estadio Metropolitano de Madrid
- Location: University City, Madrid, Spain
- Coordinates: 40.447527°N 3.716147°W
- Owner: Atlético Madrid
- Operator: Atlético Madrid
- Capacity: 35,800

Construction
- Opened: 13 May 1923
- Closed: 1966

Tenant
- Atlético Madrid (1923–36; 1943–66)

Estadio Metropolitano de Madrid was a multi-use stadium in Madrid, Spain. It was used as the stadium of Atlético Madrid matches before the Vicente Calderón Stadium opened in 1966. The stadium held 35,800 people and was built in 1923, replacing Campo de O'Donnell.
