= Racing Madrid FC =

Racing Madrid
- Full name: Racing Madrid 1914 Fútbol Club
- Founded: 1914; 1940 (as Racing Chamberí); 2022 (as Racing Madrid City)
- Ground: David González Rubio, Madrid, Spain
- Capacity: 1,000
- Owners: Steve Nijjar; Morris Pagniello Aman Sidhu; Russell Peters
- Manager: Conra Galán
- League: Primera Autonómica de Aficionados – Group 2
- 2025–26: Tercera Federación – Group 7, 18th of 18 (relegated)
- Website: https://www.racingmadridfc.com/
| Home colours | Away colours |

Racing Madrid 1914 Fútbol Club (officially Sección de Acción Deportiva Racing Ciudad de Madrid) is a Spanish football team based in Madrid. Founded in 1914, they play in Primera Autonómica de Aficionados – Group 2.

The club was originally known as Racing Club de Madrid, playing in one Segunda División and one Tercera División season before being dissolved in 1932. Back in 1939 as Racing Club de Chamberí, the club later became Agrupación Recreativa Chamberí, also playing in one Tercera División campaign before also folding in 1981.

In 2022, a group of investors refounded Racing de Madrid as Racing de Madrid City Fútbol Club, immediately buying a place in the Preferente.

== History ==
=== Racing de Madrid ===
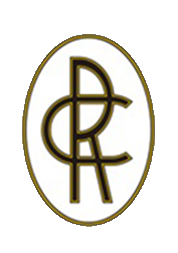
First shield of the club adopted in 1914.

Racing Club de Madrid was founded in 1914 by a merger of two Madrid clubs, Instituto Cardenal Cisneros and Regional FC, and joined the Federación Castellana in 1915. They played in the top division of the Campeonato Regional Centro, attempting to qualify for the Copa del Rey which at that time was the national championship. They won the Centro Championship in 1915 and 1919, but were unable to play in the 1915 Copa del Rey due to not having completed the registration process earlier in the year. In the 1919 Copa, Racing lost to eventual winners Arenas Club de Getxo after a replay.

Originally playing in the Paseo del General Martínez Campos fields, Racing de Madrid played in the inaugural 1929 Segunda División season, finishing in the last position. Relegated to the newly-established Tercera División in 1930, the club declined to play in the division along with many others. They moved to the Campo de Fútbol de Vallecas shortly after, and after playing in Tercera during the 1930–31 campaign, they suffered another drop.

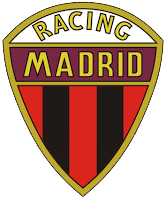
Shield used between 1928 and 1930

In 1931, in debt due to the construction of the new stadium, Racing de Madrid went on a trip to Peru, Cuba, Mexico and the United States to play friendlies, but the players were abandoned by the intermediate who organized the trip. Without money to return to Spain, the Federación Castellana paid the trip back, but sanctioned the club with another relegation to the Segunda Regional. Their new stadium, Vallecas, had to be sold to help clear the club's debt with the Federación Castellana.

Racing de Madrid then opted to play friendlies in their home country before attempting to return to the Primera Regional in January 1932. They were denied registration by the Federación Castellana, which told them they had to play in Segunda Regional due to their sanction, and after declining to play in the division, the club was ultimately dissolved.

=== Chamberí ===
After the Spanish Civil War, the club had their successor as Racing Club Chamberí (originally Unión Balompédica Chamberí, a separate club founded in 1927) in 1940. In 1941, the club was renamed Agrupación Recreativa Chamberí; the club then claimed themselves as the original heir of Racing de Madrid, in an attempt to regain their place in Tercera División, but the plead was rejected by the Spanish Football Federation. They still managed to achieve a promotion to Tercera División in 1947, but suffered immediate relegation, and also folded in 1981.

=== Racing Madrid FC ===
In 2022, a group of investors founded Racing Madrid City Fútbol Club, and immediately bought the place of Sección de Acción Deportiva Cenafe in the Preferente. In May 2025, the new club achieved a first-ever promotion to Tercera Federación.

=== Club background ===
- Racing Club de Madrid (1914–1932)
- Racing Club de Chamberí (1940–1941)
- Agrupación Recreativa Chamberí (1941–1977)
- Racing Madrid City Fútbol Club (2022–2024)
- Racing Madrid Fútbol Club (2024–)

== Season to season ==
=== Racing de Madrid ===
| Season | Tier | Division | Place | Copa del Rey |
|---|---|---|---|---|
| 1914–15 | — | Reg. | 1st | |
| 1915–16 | — | Reg. | 2nd | |
| 1916–17 | — | Reg. | 3rd | |
| 1917–18 | — | Reg. | 3rd | |
| 1918–19 | — | Reg. | 1st | Quarterfinals |
| 1919–20 | — | Reg. | 3rd | |
| 1920–21 | — | Reg. | 2nd | |
| 1921–22 | — | Reg. | 3rd | |
| 1922–23 | — | Reg. | 3rd | |

| Season | Tier | Division | Place | Copa del Rey |
|---|---|---|---|---|
| 1923–24 | — | Reg. | 2nd | |
| 1924–25 | — | Reg. | 4th | |
| 1925–26 | — | Reg. | 4th | |
| 1926–27 | — | Reg. | 3rd | |
| 1927–28 | — | Reg. | 3rd | |
| 1929 | 2 | 2ª | 10th | Quarter-finals |
| 1929–30 | 4 | Reg. | 2nd | Round of 64 |
| 1930–31 | 3 | 3ª | 7th | Round of 32 |

- 1 season in Segunda División
- 1 season in Tercera División

=== AR Chamberí ===
| Season | Tier | Division | Place | Copa del Rey |
|---|---|---|---|---|
| 1940–41 | 5 | 2ª Reg. | 4th | |
| 1941–42 | 5 | 3ª Reg. | 5th | |
| 1942–43 | DNP | | | |
| 1943–44 | DNP | | | |
| 1944–45 | 5 | 2ª Reg. | 2nd | |
| 1945–46 | 5 | 2ª Reg. | 3rd | |
| 1946–47 | 4 | 1ª Reg. | 1st | |
| 1947–48 | 3 | 3ª | 7th | Third round |
| 1948–49 | 4 | 1ª Reg. | 8th | |
| 1949–50 | 4 | 1ª Reg. | 5th | |
| 1950–51 | 4 | 1ª Reg. | 11th | |
| 1951–52 | 4 | 1ª Reg. | 3rd | |
| 1952–53 | 4 | 1ª Reg. | 4th | |
| 1953–54 | 4 | 1ª Reg. | 19th | |
| 1954–55 | 5 | 2ª Reg. | 7th | |
| 1955–56 | 5 | 2ª Reg. | 5th | |
| 1956–57 | 5 | 2ª Reg. | 6th | |
| 1957–58 | 5 | 2ª Reg. | 11th | |
| 1958–59 | 6 | 3ª Reg. | 7th | |

| Season | Tier | Division | Place | Copa del Rey |
|---|---|---|---|---|
| 1959–60 | 6 | 3ª Reg. | 14th | |
| 1960–61 | 5 | 2ª Reg. | 15th | |
| 1961–62 | 6 | 3ª Reg. | 10th | |
| 1962–63 | 6 | 3ª Reg. | 4th | |
| 1963–64 | 5 | 2ª Reg. | 7th | |
| 1964–65 | 5 | 2ª Reg. | 13th | |
| 1965–66 | 5 | 2ª Reg. | 16th | |
| 1966–67 | 6 | 3ª Reg. | 5th | |
| 1967–68 | 6 | 3ª Reg. | 4th | |
| 1968–69 | 6 | 3ª Reg. | 11th | |
| 1969–70 | 7 | 3ª Reg. | 2nd | |
| 1970–71 | 5 | 2ª Reg. | 19th | |
| 1971–72 | 6 | 3ª Reg. P. | 11th | |
| 1972–73 | 6 | 3ª Reg. P. | 12th | |
| 1973–74 | 7 | 3ª Reg. P. | 6th | |
| 1974–75 | 7 | 3ª Reg. P. | 6th | |
| 1975–76 | 6 | 2ª Reg. | 18th | |
| 1976–77 | 7 | 3ª Reg. P. | (R) | |

- 1 season in Tercera División

=== Racing Madrid FC ===
| Season | Tier | Division | Place | Copa del Rey |
|---|---|---|---|---|
| 2022–23 | 6 | Pref. | 8th | |
| 2023–24 | 6 | Pref. | 4th | |
| 2024–25 | 6 | 1ª Aut. | 1st | |
| 2025–26 | 5 | 3ª Fed. | | |

- 1 season in Tercera Federación

== Honours ==
- Campeonato Regional Centro:
  - Winners (2): 1914–15, 1918–19
  - Runners-up (4): 1915–16, 1920–21, 1923–24, 1929–30
