= 1934–35 Madrid FC season =

33rd season in existence of Real Madrid CF

Madrid Football Club
1934–35 season
- President: Luis Usera Bugallal
- Manager: Francisco Bru
- Stadium: Chamartín
- Primera Division: 2nd
- Campeonato Regional Mancomunado (Note: The Campeonato Regional Mancomunado (Joint Regional Championship) was a regional league used as a qualifier for the Copa del Presidente de la República.): 1st
- Copa del Presidente de la República: Round of 16
- Top goalscorer: League: Fernando Sañudo (20); All: Fernando Sañudo (20)
Home colours	Away colours

The 1934–35 season was Madrid Football Club's 33rd season in existence, and their 7th consecutive season in the Primera División. The club also played in the Campeonato Regional Mancomunado (Joint Regional Championship) and the Copa del Presidente de la República (President of the Republic's Cup).

== Summary ==
The club appointed Francisco Bru as coach for the season after a good streak of results last season. The squad was reinforced with several players, including forward Fernando Sañudo, Diz, Losada, Lopez, Rodrigo, Alonso and the first foreign transfer ever for the club, Hungarian goalkeeper Gyula Alberti. Despite a Clásico record for the biggest win in the league, a massive score of 8–2 on 3 February 1935 vs FC Barcelona, including a poker of goals from "Golden Feet" Sañudo, the team ended up runners-up for the second consecutive year, this time losing the title by a single point to champions Betis Balompié.

Meanwhile, in the 1935 Copa del Presidente de la República, the team was defeated by Sevilla Football Club in the round of 16.

== Squad ==
Note: Flags indicate national team as defined under FIFA eligibility rules; some limited exceptions apply. Players may hold more than one non-FIFA nationality.

No.	Pos.	Nation	Player
—	GK	ESP	Ricardo Zamora
—	DF	ESP	Félix Quesada
—	DF	ESP	Jacinto Quincoces
—	MF	ESP	Antonio Bonet
—	MF	ESP	Leoncito
—	MF	ESP	Pedro Regueiro
—	MF	ESP	Jaime Lazcano
—	FW	ESP	Fernando Sañudo
—	FW	ESP	Eugenio
—	FW	ESP	Hilario
—	FW	ESP	Luis Regueiro

No.	Pos.	Nation	Player
—	GK	HUN	Gyula Alberty
—	DF	ESP	Ciriaco Errasti
—	FW	ESP	Emilin
—	MF	ESP	Luis Valle
—	MF	MEX	José Ramón Sauto
—	GK	ESP	Francisco Campos
—	MF	ESP	Manuel Gurruchaga
—	FW	ESP	Francisco Diz
—	FW	ESP	Losada
—	FW	ESP	Lopez

=== Transfers ===
In
Pos.	Name	from	Type
FW	Fernando Sañudo		
GK	Alberty		
FW	Diz	Deportivo La Coruña	
FW	Santiago Losada	Athletic Madrid	
GK	Rodrigo	Deportivo La Coruña	
DF	Alonso		

Out
Pos.	Name	To	Type
FW	Josep Samitier		
FW	Manuel Olivares	Donostia	
GK	Cayol		
MF	Villanueva	Valladolid	
MF	Sauto		
FW	Blazquez	Hércules FC	
MF	Arocha	Betis Balompié	
DF	Alonso	Real Zaragoza	

== Competitions ==
=== La Liga ===
==== League table ====
Pos	Team	Pld	W	D	L	GF	GA	GD	Pts
1	Betis (C)	22	15	4	3	43	19	+24	34
2	Madrid FC	22	16	1	5	61	34	+27	33
3	Oviedo	22	12	2	8	60	47	+13	26
4	Athletic Bilbao	22	11	3	8	60	37	+23	25
5	Sevilla	22	11	2	9	53	38	+15	24 (Note: Sevilla finished ahead of Barcelona on head-to-head points: Sevilla–Barcelona 3–1, Barcelona–Sevilla 2–3.)

Source: BDFútbol
Rules for classification: 1) points; 2) head-to-head points; 3) head-to-head goal difference; 4) goal difference; 5) number of goals scored.
(C) Champions

==== Results by round ====
Round	1	2	3	4	5	6	7	8	9	10	11	12	13	14	15	16	17	18	19	20	21	22
Ground	H	A	H	A	H	A	H	A	A	H	A	A	H	A	H	A	H	A	H	H	A	H
Result	L	W	W	W	W	L	W	W	L	W	W	L	W	D	W	W	W	W	W	W	L	W
Position	9	7	6	5	4	2	3	2	2	2	2	2	2	2	2	2	2	2	2	2	2	2

Source: Competitive matches
A = Away; H = Home; W = Win; D = Draw; L = Loss

==== Matches ====
2 December 1934 1	Madrid FC	0–1	Betis Balompié	Chamartín de la Rosa
		Report		Stadium: Chamartín

9 December 1934 2	Donostia	1–2	Madrid FC	San Sebastián
		Report		Stadium: Atotxa

16 December 1934 3	Madrid FC	2–0	Atlético Madrid	Chamartín de la Rosa
		Report		Stadium: Chamartín

23 December 1934 4	Oviedo	0–3	Madrid FC	Oviedo
		Report		Stadium: Buenavista

30 December 1934 5	Madrid FC	7–2	Español	Chamartín de la Rosa
		Report		Stadium: Chamartín

6 January 1935 6	Athletic Club	4–1	Madrid FC	Bilbao
		Report		Stadium: San Mamés

13 January 1935 7	Madrid FC	3–1	Sevilla Football Club	Chamartín de la Rosa
		Report		Stadium: Chamartín

20 January 1935 8	Racing Santander	1–2	Madrid FC	Santander
		Report		Stadium: El Sardinero

27 January 1935 9	Valencia	4–1	Madrid FC	Valencia
		Report		Stadium: Mestalla

3 February 1935 10	Madrid FC	8–2	FC Barcelona	Chamartín de la Rosa
	Lazcano 15'; Sañudo 21'; Luis Regueiro 29'; Sañudo 35'; Lazcano 42'; Sañudo 47'; Lazcano 73'; Sañudo 81'	Report	Escolá 17'; Guzman 68'	Stadium: Chamartín; Referee: Villanueva Calonge

10 February 1935 11	Arenas	1–2	Madrid FC	Getxo
		Report		Stadium: Ibaiondo

17 February 1935 12	Betis Balompié	1–0	Madrid FC	Sevilla
		Report		Stadium: Patronato Obrero

24 February 1935 13	Madrid FC	2–0	Donostia	Chamartín de la Rosa
		Report		Stadium: Chamartín

3 March 1935 14	Atlético Madrid	2–2	Madrid FC	Madrid
	Chacho 17'; Mendaro '25; Elicegui 75'	Report	33' Emilín; 50' Hilario	Stadium: Metropolitano

10 March 1935 15	Madrid FC	2–1	Oviedo	Chamartín de la Rosa
		Report		Stadium: Chamartín

17 March 1935 16	Español	2–4	Madrid FC	Barcelona
		Report		Stadium: Sarria

24 March 1935 17	Madrid FC	5–2	Athletic Club	Chamartín de la Rosa
		Report		Stadium: Chamartín

31 March 1935 18	Sevilla Football Club	1–3	Madrid FC	Sevilla
		Report		Stadium: Nervion

7 April 1935 19	Madrid FC	3–2	Racing Santander	Chamartín de la Rosa
		Report		Stadium: Chamartín

14 April 1935 20	Madrid FC	3–0	Valencia	Chamartín de la Rosa
		Report		Stadium: Chamartín

21 April 1935 21	FC Barcelona	5–0	Madrid FC	Barcelona
		Report		Stadium: Camp de Les Corts

28 April 1935 22	Madrid FC	6–1	Arenas	Chamartín de la Rosa
		Report		Stadium: Chamartín

=== Campeonato Regional Mancomunado Centro-Sur ===
==== League table ====
Pos	Team	Pld	W	D	L	GF	GA	GD	Pts
1	Madrid FC	12	10	0	2	41	13	+28	20
2	Racing de Santander	12	7	1	4	39	25	+14	15
3	Athletic de Madrid	12	5	4	3	36	24	+12	14
4	CD Nacional	12	4	2	6	27	33	−6	10
5	Zaragoza FC	12	4	2	6	18	25	−7	10
6	Valladolid Deportivo	12	4	1	7	17	26	−9	9
7	CD Logroño	12	3	0	9	16	49	−33	6

Source: BDFutbol

=== Copa del Presidente de la República ===
==== Round of 16 ====
19 May 1935	Sevilla Football Club	1–0	Madrid FC	Sevilla
		Report		Stadium: Nervion

26 May 1935	Madrid FC	0–0	Sevilla Football Club	Chamartín de la Rosa
		Report		Stadium: Chamartín

== Statistics ==
=== Player statistics ===
No.	Pos	Nat	Player	Total		La Liga		Copa		Regional Centro-Sur	
No.	Pos	Nat	Player	Apps	Goals	Apps	Goals	Apps	Goals	Apps	Goals
	GK	(Spain) ESP	Ricardo Zamora	17	-24	16	-24	1	0		
	DF	(Spain) ESP	Quesada	13	0	13	0				
	DF	(Spain) ESP	Jacinto Quincoces	20	0	18	0	2	0		
	MF	(Spain) ESP	Antonio Bonet	23	0	21	0	2	0		
	MF	(Spain) ESP	Leoncito	23	0	21	0	2	0		
	MF	(Spain) ESP	Pedro Regueiro	23	0	21	0	2	0		
	MF	(Spain) ESP	Jaime Lazcano	13	6	13	6				
	FW	(Spain) ESP	Fernando Sañudo	19	20	17	20	2	0		
	FW	(Spain) ESP	Eugenio	17	0	15	0	2	0		
	FW	(Spain) ESP	Hilario	22	10	22	10				
	FW	(Spain) ESP	Luis Regueiro	23	13	21	13	2	0		
	GK	(Hungary) HUN	Alberty	6	-7	5	-6	1	-1		
	DF	(Spain) ESP	Ciriaco Errasti	12	0	10	0	2	0		
	FW	(Spain) ESP	Emilin	12	5	10	5	2	0		
	MF	(Spain) ESP	Valle	3	0	3	0				
	MF	(Mexico) MEX	Sauto	0	0	0	0	0	0		
	GK	(Spain) ESP	Campos	1	-4	1	-4				
	MF	(Spain) ESP	Gurruchaga	3	3	3	3				
	FW	(Spain) ESP	Francisco Diz	6	0	6	0				
	FW	(Spain) ESP	Losada	5	3	4	3	1	0		
	FW	(Spain) ESP	Lopez	3	0	2	0	1	0		
