= 1933–34 Madrid FC season =

32nd season in existence of Real Madrid CF

Madrid Football Club
1933–34 season
- President: Luis Usera Bugallal
- Manager: Robert Firth (until 10 December 1933); Francisco Bru (from 1 January 1933)
- Stadium: Chamartín
- Primera Division: 2nd
- Campeonato Regional Mancomunado (Note: The Campeonato Regional Mancomunado (Joint Regional Championship) was a regional league used as a qualifier for the Copa del Presidente de la República.): 2nd
- Copa del Presidente de la República: Winners
Home colours	Away colours

The 1933–34 season was Madrid Football Club's 32nd season in existence, and their 6th consecutive season in the Primera División. The club also played in the Campeonato Regional Mancomunado (Joint Regional Championship) and the Copa del Presidente de la República (President of the Republic's Cup).

== Summary ==
During summer the club as Incumbent League Champions reinforced the squad with young players such as Mexican midfielder José Ramón Sauto, Villanueva and Emilin. In Autumn the team won the regional championship and by December the Board fired Firth following a landslide defeat 0–5 against Athletic Bilbao. After two matches without coach, in January the Executive Board appointed Francisco Bru as new manager and the squad finished second, two points below Athletic Bilbao.

Meanwhile, in the 1934 Copa del Presidente de la República Madrid reached the final where it faced Valencia Football Club. With a superb performance of Captain Ricardo Zamora, the team clinched its sixth Spanish Cup.

== Squad ==
Note: Flags indicate national team as defined under FIFA eligibility rules; some limited exceptions apply. Players may hold more than one non-FIFA nationality.

No.	Pos.	Nation	Player
—	GK	ESP	Ricardo Zamora (captain)
—	DF	ESP	Ciriaco Errasti
—	DF	ESP	Jacinto Quincoces
—	MF	ESP	Pedro Regueiro
—	MF	ESP	Antonio Bonet
—	MF	ESP	Leoncito
—	MF	ESP	Jaime Lazcano
—	FW	ESP	Luis Regueiro
—	FW	ESP	Josep Samitier
—	FW	ESP	Hilario
—	FW	ESP	Eugenio Hilario

No.	Pos.	Nation	Player
—	DF	ESP	Félix Quesada
—	MF	ESP	Luis Valle
—	FW	ESP	Manuel Olivares
—	GK	ESP	Gilberto Cayol
—	FW	ESP	Emilin
—	MF	ESP	Avelino Álvarez
—	MF	MEX	José Ramón Sauto
—	FW	ESP	Emilio Blazquez
—	FW	ESP	Francisco Campos
—	MF	ESP	Arsenio Arocha
—	MF	ESP	Manuel Gurruchaga

=== Transfers ===
In
Pos.	Name	from	Type
FW	Emilin	Arenas de Getxo	
GK	Gilberto Cayol	CD Tenerife	
MF	José Ramón Sauto		
MF	Avelino Álvarez		
FW	Arsenio Arocha	CD Tenerife	
FW	Emilio Blazquez		

Out
Pos.	Name	To	Type
FW	Olaso		
GK	Vidal	Levante FC	
MF	Gomez	Atlético Madrid	
MF	Eduardo Ordoñez	Atlético Madrid	

== Competitions ==
=== La Liga ===
==== League table ====
Pos	Team	Pld	W	D	L	GF	GA	GD	Pts
1	Athletic Bilbao (C)	18	11	2	5	61	27	+34	24
2	Madrid FC	18	10	2	6	41	29	+12	22
3	Racing Santander	18	9	1	8	38	39	−1	19 (Note: Racing Santander finished ahead of Betis on head-to-head goal difference: Racing Santander–Betis 4–1, Betis–Racing Santander 2–1.)
4	Betis	18	9	1	8	29	36	−7	19
5	Donostia	18	7	4	7	29	33	−4	18 (Note: Donostia finished ahead of Oviedo on head-to-head goal difference: Donostia–Oviedo 3–1, Oviedo–Donostia 3–2.)

Source: BDFútbol
Rules for classification: 1) points; 2) head-to-head points; 3) head-to-head goal difference; 4) goal difference; 5) number of goals scored.
(C) Champions

==== Results by round ====
Round	1	2	3	4	5	6	7	8	9	10	11	12	13	14	15	16	17	18
Ground	A	H	H	H	H	A	H	A	H	H	A	A	H	A	H	A	H	A
Result	D	W	W	W	W	L	L	L	W	W	L	W	W	L	W	L	W	D
Position	5	2	1	1	1	1	2	3	2	2	3	2	2	2	2	2	2	2

Source: Competitive matches
A = Away; H = Home; W = Win; D = Draw; L = Loss

==== Matches ====
5 November 1933 1	Arenas	3–3	Madrid FC	Getxo
	Yermo 30'; Pérez 57'; Urquiza 75'	Report	Eugenio 21'; Olivares 46'; Luis Regueiro 61'	Stadium: Ibaiondo; Referee: Steimborn Ludeuvik

12 November 1933 2	Madrid FC	3–2	Valencia	Chamartín de la Rosa
	Olivares 16'; Luis Regueiro 33'; Olivares 64'	Report	Mentxaka 5'; Cervera 49'	Stadium: Chamartín; Referee: Villanueva Calonge

18 November 1933 3	Madrid FC	2–0	Donostia	Chamartín de la Rosa
	Emilín 58'; Leoncito 84'	Report		Stadium: Estadio Chamartín; Referee: Elizari Navarlaz

26 November 1933 4	Barcelona	1–2	Madrid FC	Barcelona
	Morera 46'	Report	Olivares 9'; Regueiro 26'	Stadium: Les Corts; Referee: Vallana Jeanguenat

3 December 1933 5	Madrid FC	1–0	Racing de Santander	Chamartín de la Rosa
	Eugenio 28'	Report		Stadium: Chamartín; Referee: Steimborn Ludeuvik

10 December 1933 6	Athletic Club	5–1	Madrid FC	Bilbao
	Bata 1'; Chirri II 40'; Gorostiza 52'; Iraragorri 63'; Iraragorri 80'	Report	Luis Regueiro 9'	Stadium: San Mamés; Referee: Iturralde Gorostiaga

17 December 1933 7	Madrid FC	0–1	Betis	Chamartín de la Rosa
		Report	Unamuno 48'	Stadium: Chamartín; Referee: Sanchis Orduña

24 December 1933 8	Oviedo	3–2	Madrid FC	Oviedo
	Chuslé 21'; Herrerita 78'; Lángara 88'	Report	Luis Regueiro 32'; Olivares 79'	Stadium: Buenavista; Referee: Ostalé Gómez

31 December 1933 9	Madrid FC	3–2	Espanyol	Chamartín de la Rosa
	Eugenio 10'; Eugenio 30'; Eugenio 47'	Report	Iriondo 5'; Edelmiro 43'	Stadium: Chamartín; Referee: Del Campo Echevarría

7 January 1934 10	Madrid FC	2–1	Arenas	Chamartín de la Rosa
	Emilín 21' (pen.); Hilario 78'	Report	Urresti 80'	Stadium: Chamartín; Referee: Castarlenas Mora

14 January 1934 11	Valencia	2–1	Madrid FC	Valencia
	Costa 20'; Cervera 70'	Report	Eugenio 41'	Stadium: Mestalla; Referee: Vilalta Bars

21 January 1934 12	Donostia	0–3	Madrid FC	San Sebastián
		Report	Luis Regueiro 81'; Eugenio 86'; Luis Regueiro 89'	Stadium: Atotxa; Referee: Arribas Seijas

28 January 1934 13	Madrid FC	4–0	Barcelona	Madrid
	Valle 7'; Samitier 20'; Regueiro 30'; Eugenio 50'	Report		Stadium: Chamartín; Referee: Vallana Jeanguenat

4 February 1934 14	Racing de Santander	4–3	Madrid FC	Santander
	Pombo 30'; Pombo 40'; San Miguel 54'; San Miguel 68'	Report	Lazcano 51'; Olivares 75'; Luis Regueiro 77'	Stadium: El Sardinero; Referee: Iturralde Gorostiaga

11 February 1934 15	Madrid FC	3–0	Athletic Bilbao	Chamartín de la Rosa
	Luis Regueiro 19'; Lazcano 32'; Olivares 52'	Report		Stadium: Chamartín; Referee: Vilalta Bars

18 February 1934 16	Betis	2–1	Madrid FC	Seville
	Saro 3'; Lecue 42'	Report	Luis Regueiro 14'	Stadium: Patronato Obrero; Referee: Arribas Seijas

25 February 1934 17	Madrid FC	5–1	Oviedo	Chamartín de la Rosa
	Lazcano 12'; Leoncito 37'; Blázquez 40'; Eugenio 52'; Blázquez 87'	Report	Lángara 35'	Stadium: Chamartín; Referee: Iturralde Gorostiaga

4 March 1934 18	Espanyol	2–2	Madrid FC	Barcelona
	Edelmiro II 65'; Edelmiro 89'	Report	Luis Regueiro 15'; Blázquez 67'	Stadium: Sarrià; Referee: Steimborn Ludeuvik

=== Campeonato Regional Mancomunado Centro-Sur ===
==== Position by round ====
Round	1	2	3	4	5	6	7	8	9	10
Ground	H	A	H	A	H	A	H	A	H	A
Result	W	D	L	W	L	W	W	D	W	W
Position	1	1	3	3	4	4	1	1	1	1

Source: www.lfp.es
A = Away; H = Home; W = Win; D = Draw; L = Loss

==== Matches ====
3 September 1933 1	Madrid FC	9–3	Valladolid	Chamartín de la Rosa
				Stadium: Chamartín

10 September 1933 2	Real Betis	0–0	Madrid FC	Sevilla
				Stadium: Patronato Obrero

17 September 1933 3	Madrid FC	0–2	Atlético Madrid	Chamartín de la Rosa
				Stadium: Chamartín

24 September 1933 4	CD Nacional de Madrid	1–3	Madrid FC	Madrid
				Stadium: El Parral

1 October 1933 5	Madrid FC	1–2	Sevilla FC	Chamartín de la Rosa
				Stadium: Chamartín

8 October 1933 6	Valladolid	1–3	Madrid FC	Valladolid
				Stadium: Estadio Helmantico

12 October 1933 7	Madrid FC	5–0	Real Betis	Chamartín de la Rosa
				Stadium: Chamartín

15 October 1933 8	Atlético Madrid	2–2	Madrid FC	Vallecas
				Stadium: Campo Vallecas

22 October 1933 9	Madrid FC	5–1	CD Nacional de Madrid	Chamartín de la Rosa
				Stadium: Chamartín

29 October 1933 10	Sevilla FC	0–2	Madrid FC	Sevilla
				Stadium: Estadio de Nervión

=== Copa del Presidente de la República ===
==== Final ====
6 May 1934	Madrid FC	2–1	Valencia FC	Barcelona
16:45 CET	Hilario 71'; Lazcano 73'		Vilanova 48'	Stadium: Montjuïc; Attendance: 42,000; Referee: Agustín Vilalta

== Statistics ==
=== Player statistics ===
No.	Pos	Nat	Player	Total		La Liga		Copa		Regional Centro-Sur	
No.	Pos	Nat	Player	Apps	Goals	Apps	Goals	Apps	Goals	Apps	Goals
	GK	(Spain) ESP	Ricardo Zamora	21	-27	12	-20	9	-7		
	DF	(Spain) ESP	Quesada	16	0	16	0	0	0		
	DF	(Spain) ESP	Jacinto Quincoces	27	0	18	0	9	0		
	MF	(Spain) ESP	Pedro Regueiro	26	0	17	0	9	0		
	MF	(Spain) ESP	Leoncito	21	3	16	2	5	1		
	MF	(Spain) ESP	Valle	13	1	11	1	2	0		
	MF	(Spain) ESP	Jaime Lazcano	16	5	10	3	6	2		
	FW	(Spain) ESP	Luis Regueiro	26	13	18	12	8	1		
	FW	(Spain) ESP	Hilario	19	7	13	1	6	6		
	FW	(Spain) ESP	Eugenio	25	11	16	9	9	2		
	FW	(Spain) ESP	Manuel Olivares	15	8	12	7	3	1		
	GK	(Spain) ESP	Cayol	6	-9	6	-9	0	0		
	FW	(Spain) ESP	Emilin	14	3	11	2	3	1		
	FW	(Spain) ESP	Josep Samitier	10	6	2	1	8	5		
	DF	(Spain) ESP	Ciriaco Errasti	11	0	2	0	9	0		
	MF	(Spain) ESP	Villanueva	7	0	7	0	0	0		
	MF	(Spain) ESP	Antonio Bonet	8	0	0	0	8	0		
	MF	(Mexico) MEX	Sauto	5	0	5	0	0	0		
	FW	(Spain) ESP	Blazquez	5	5	3	3	2	2		
	FW	(Spain) ESP	Campos	0	0	0	0				
	MF	(Spain) ESP	Arocha	2	0	2	0				
	MF	(Spain) ESP	Gurruchaga	4	0	1	0	3	0		
