= 1930–31 Real Madrid CF season =

29th season in existence of Real Madrid CF

Real Madrid/Madrid FC
1930–31 season
- President: Luis Usera Bugallal
- Manager: Lippo Hertzka
- La Liga: 6th
- Campeonato Regional Centro (Note: The Campeonato Regional Centro (Central Regional Championship) was a regional league used as a qualifier for the Copa del Rey.): 1st
- Copa del Rey: Quarter-finals
- Top goalscorer: League: Jaime Lazcano (4); Leoncito (4); Eugenio Hilario (4); All: Mariano García Puerta (6)
Home colours	Away colours

The 1930–31 season was Real Madrid Club de Fútbol's 29th season in existence, and their 3rd consecutive season in the Primera División. The club also played in the Campeonato Regional Centro (Central Regional Championship) and the Copa del Rey.

The establishment of the Second Spanish Republic in April 1931 caused Real Madrid Club de Fútbol to lose the title "Real" and the royal crown from their crest and badge, and Real Madrid went back to being named Madrid Football Club.

== First-team squad ==
Note: Flags indicate national team as defined under FIFA eligibility rules; some limited exceptions apply. Players may hold more than one non-FIFA nationality.

No.	Pos.	Nation	Player
—	GK	ESP	Ricardo Zamora
—	GK	ESP	Rafael Vidal
—	GK	ESP	Ramón Nebot
—	DF	ESP	Félix Quesada
—	DF	ESP	José Torregrosa
—	DF	ESP	Patricio Escobal
—	MF	ESP	Antonio Bonet
—	MF	ESP	José María Peña
—	MF	ESP	Manuel Prats
—	MF	ESP	Desiderio Esparza
—	MF	ESP	Rafael Morera
—	MF	ESP	José Galé

No.	Pos.	Nation	Player
—	MF	ESP	Cosme Vázquez
—	MF	ESP	Leoncito
—	MF	ESP	Manuel Gurruchaga
—	MF	ESP	Manuel Valderrama
—	FW	ESP	Eugenio Hilario
—	FW	ESP	Luis Olaso
—	FW	ESP	Jaime Lazcano
—	FW	ESP	Ramón Triana
—	FW	ESP	Cándido Urretavizcaya
—	FW	ESP	Francisco Eguía
—	FW	ESP	Mariano García Puerta

== Transfers ==
=== In ===
Pos	Player	From
GK	(Spain) Ricardo Zamora	(Spain) Español
DF	(Spain) Patricio Escobal	(Spain) Academy
MF	(Spain) Antonio Bonet	(Spain) Sagunto
MF	(Spain) Leoncito	(Spain) Cultural Leonesa
MF	(Spain) Manuel Gurruchaga	(Spain) Arenas
FW	(Spain) Manuel Valderrama	(Spain) Racing de Madrid
FW	(Spain) Eugenio Hilario	(Spain) Real Sociedad
FW	(Spain) Cándido Urretavizcaya	(Spain) Guipuzcoa
FW	(Spain) Francisco Eguía	(Spain) Celta
FW	(Spain) Mariano García Puerta	(Spain) Murcia

=== Out ===
Pos	Player	To
MF	(Spain) Lope Peña	(Spain) Racing de Madrid
MF	(Spain) Manuel Cominges	(Spain)
MF	(Spain) Luis Bergareche	(Spain)
MF	(Spain) Francisco López	(Spain)
FW	(Spain) Gaspar Rubio	(Cuba) Juventud Asturiana
FW	(Spain) Evaristo San Miguel	(Spain)
FW	(Spain) Gerónimo del Campo	(Spain)
FW	(Spain) Eugenio Moriones	(Spain)

== Friendlies ==
Kick Off	Opponents	H / A	Result	Scorers
1930-09-07	(Portugal) Os Belenenses	N	5–0	Olaso (2), Hilario, Morera, Lazcano
1930-09-09	(Portugal) Os Belenenses	N	0–3	
1930-09-18	(Spain) Nacional	H	4–2	Hilario (2), Morera, Vázquez
1930-10-15	(Spain) Unión Sporting	A	5–2	Morera (3), Hilario, Rubio (pen)
1930-10-22	(Spain) Nacional	H	7–1	
1930-11-01	(Spain) Sevilla	A	1–2	Sedeño (o.g.)
1930-11-02	(Spain) Sevilla	A	2–2	Eguía, Vázquez
1930-11-16	(Spain) Athletic Bilbao	A	2–2	Leoncito (2)
1930-12-08	(Spain) Athletic Bilbao	H	5–2	García Puerta (3), Hilario, Galé
1930-12-28	(Hungary) Budapest III Kerr	H	7–2	Gurruchaga (2), Lazcano (2), García Puerta (2), Eguía
1931-01-01	(Argentina) Gimnasia	H	2–3	Lazcano, Galé
1931-01-19	(Spain) Recreativo	A	1–3	Eguía
1931-01-20	(Spain) Recreativo	A	0–1	
1931-03-05	(Spain) Combinado Universitario	H	4–1	Vázquez (2), Morera, Valderrama
1931-04-05	(Spain) Atlético	N	0–5	
1931-04-06	(Spain) Badalona	A	0–0	
1931-04-19	(Spain) Atlético	H	1–3	Leoncito
1931-05-30	(Spain) Toledo	A	5–1	Gurruchaga (2), Hoyos (2), Rodríguez
1931-06-07	(Spain) Leganés	A	7–3	
1931-06-14	(Spain) Valencia	H	1–0	García Puerta
1931-07-12	(Spain) Atlético	N	2–1	Rodríguez, Olaso

== Competitions ==
=== Overview ===
Competition	First match	Last match	Starting round	Final position	Record							
Competition	First match	Last match	Starting round	Final position	Pld	W	D	L	GF	GA	GD	Win %
Campeonato Regional Centro	14 September 1930	30 November 1930	Matchday 1	Winners	10	9	1	0	34	10	+24	90.00
La Liga	7 December 1930	5 April 1931	Matchday 1	6th	18	7	4	7	24	27	−3	38.89
Copa del Rey	26 April 1931	31 May 1931	Round of 32	Quarter-finals	6	4	1	1	0	0	+0	66.67
Total					34	20	6	8	58	37	+21	58.82

Source: Competitions

=== La Liga ===
==== League table ====
Pos	Team	Pld	W	D	L	GF	GA	GD	Pts
4	Barcelona	18	7	7	4	40	43	−3	21
5	Arenas	18	8	2	8	35	38	−3	18 (Note: Arenas finished ahead of Real Madrid on head-to-head points: Arenas–Real Madrid 4–1, Real Madrid–Arenas 1–2.)
6	Real Madrid	18	7	4	7	24	32	−8	18
7	Real Unión	18	6	4	8	41	45	−4	16
8	Alavés	18	5	4	9	25	39	−14	14 (Note: Alavés finished ahead of Español on head-to-head goal difference: Alavés–Español 4–1, Español–Alavés 2–0.)

Source: BDFútbol
Rules for classification: 1) points; 2) head-to-head points; 3) head-to-head goal difference; 4) goal difference; 5) number of goals scored.

==== Matches ====
Kick Off	Opponents	H / A	Result	Scorers
1930-12-07	Español	H	2–0	Lazcano 44', Leoncito 73'
1930-12-25	Arenas	A	1–4	García Puerta 51'
1930-12-27	Europa	H	3–1	Gurruchaga 20', 32', Lazcano 42'
1931-01-04	Alavés	H	1–0	García Puerta 43'
1931-01-11	Racing de Santander	A	0–3	
1931-01-18	Athletic Bilbao	H	0–6	
1931-01-25	Real Sociedad	A	1–2	Olaso 20'
1931-01-27	Real Unión	A	1–1	Lazcano 27'
1931-02-01	Barcelona	H	0–0	
1931-02-09	Español	A	1–1	Lazcano 50'
1931-02-15	Real Unión	H	3–0	Morera 30', 51', Urretavizcaya 47'
1931-02-22	Arenas	H	1–2	Leoncito 89'
1931-03-01	Europa	A	3–0	Leoncito 26', 65', Hilario 62'
1931-03-08	Alavés	A	0–2	
1931-03-15	Racing de Santander	H	0–0	
1931-03-22	Athletic Bilbao	A	4–2	Valderrama 20', Hilario 22', 79', Vázquez 42'
1931-03-29	Real Sociedad	H	2–0	Olaso 40', Vázquez 76'
1931-04-05	Barcelona	A	1–3	Hilario 40'

=== Campeonato Regional Centro ===
==== League table ====
Pos	Team	Pld	W	D	L	GF	GA	GD	Pts	Qualification
1	Real Madrid (C, Q)	10	9	1	0	34	10	+24	19	Qualification for the Copa del Rey.
2	Athletic Madrid (Q)	10	8	1	1	44	13	+31	17	Qualification for the Copa del Rey.
3	Racing Madrid (Q)	10	3	3	4	18	21	−3	9	Qualification for the Copa del Rey.
4	Nacional Madrid	10	3	2	5	19	22	−3	8	
5	Tranviaria	10	1	2	7	15	45	−30	4	
6	Unión SC	10	1	1	8	8	27	−19	3	

Source: Rec.Sport.Soccer Statistics Foundation
Rules for classification: 1) points; 2) goal difference; 3) number of goals scored.
(C) Champions; (Q) Qualified for the phase indicated

==== Matches ====
Kick Off	Opponents	H / A	Result	Scorers
1930-09-14	Nacional	H	4–2	García Puerta (3), Morera
1930-09-21	Unión Sporting	H	3–0	Quesada, Morera, García Puerta
1930-09-27	Tranviaria	A	6–0	Lazcano (4), Morera, Vázquez
1930-10-05	Racing de Madrid	H	3–2	Olaso, Vázquez, Leoncito
1930-10-12	Atlético	H	2–2	Lazcano (2)
1930-10-19	Nacional	A	2–1	Triana, Quesada
1930-11-01	Unión Sporting	H	4–1	Rubio (2), Hilario (2)
1930-11-09	Racing de Madrid	A	1–0	Lazcano
1930-11-23	Atlético	N	3–1	Lazcano, Leoncito, Olaso
1930-11-30	Tranviaria	H	6–1	Hilario (3), Morera, Urretavizcaya, Vázquez

=== Copa del Rey ===
Round	Kick Off	Opponents	H / A	Result	Scorers
R1 First Leg	1931-04-26	Eclipse	H	4–0	Vázquez 44', Esparza 50', García Puerta 55', Olaso 85'
R1 Second Leg	1931-05-03	Eclipse	A	5–2	Leoncito 2', Esparza 27', Morera 37', 60', Olaso 89'
R2 First Leg	1931-05-10	Murcia	H	3–0	García Puerta 65', 68', Vázquez 75'
R2 Second Leg	1931-05-17	Murcia	A	0–0	
QF First Leg	1931-05-24	Betis	A	0–3	
QF Second Leg	1931-05-31	Betis	H	1–0	García Puerta 30'
