= 1935–36 Madrid FC season =

34th season in existence of Real Madrid CF

Madrid Football Club
1935–36 season
- President: Luis Usera Bugallal
- Manager: Francisco Bru
- Stadium: Chamartín
- Primera Division: 2nd
- Campeonato Regional Mancomunado (Note: The Campeonato Regional Mancomunado (Joint Regional Championship) was a regional league used as a qualifier for the Copa del Presidente de la República.): 1st
- Copa del Presidente de la República: Winners
- Top goalscorer: League: Fernando Sañudo (21); All: Fernando Sañudo (30)
Home colours	Away colours

The 1935–36 season was Madrid Football Club's 34th season in existence, and their 8th consecutive season in the Primera División. The club also played in the Campeonato Regional Mancomunado (Joint Regional Championship) and the Copa del Presidente de la República (President of the Republic's Cup).

== Summary ==
During the summer, the Spanish Football Federation authorized teams to line-up two foreign players in La Liga matches. The club proceeded to finish second behind champions Athletic Bilbao, despite an excellent offensive performance led by forward Fernando Sañudo.

Meanwhile, in the Spanish Cup Real Madrid defeated Barcelona in the final on 21 June 1936 to win its seventh title, with captain Ricardo Zamora producing a superb performance.

During the autumn of 1936, the Siege of Madrid started a three-year chapter of the Spanish Civil War with attacks between the Republican forces and Nationalist forces. The Chamartín Stadium was occupied by the Republicans, and the club suspended activities, which would be resumed in 1939 after the Nationalist victory in the war.

== Squad ==
Note: Flags indicate national team as defined under FIFA eligibility rules; some limited exceptions apply. Players may hold more than one non-FIFA nationality.

No.	Pos.	Nation	Player
—	GK	HUN	Gyula Alberty
—	DF	ESP	Jacinto Quincoces
—	DF	ESP	Ciriaco Errasti
—	FW	ESP	Luis Regueiro
—	MF	ESP	Pedro Regueiro
—	MF	ESP	Antonio Bonet
—	MF	ESP	Simon Lecue
—	MF	MEX	José Ramón Sauto
—	FW	ESP	Emilin
—	FW	ESP	Fernando Sañudo

No.	Pos.	Nation	Player
—	GK	HUN	Vilmos Kelemen
—	GK	ESP	Ricardo Zamora
—	FW	ESP	Eugenio
—	MF	ESP	José Mardones
—	FW	ESP	Hilario
—	MF	ESP	Leoncito
—	FW	ESP	Francisco Diz
—	MF	BRA	Fernando Giudicelli
—	DF	ESP	Lopez Herranz
—	FW	ESP	Mendez Vigo
—	MF	HUN	Janos Buzassy

=== Transfers ===
In
Pos.	Name	from	Type
FW	Fernando Sañudo		
GK	Alberty		
FW	Francisco Diz	Deportivo La Coruña	
FW	Santiago Losada	Athletic Madrid	
GK	Rodrigo	Deportivo La Coruña	
DF	Alonso		

Out
Pos.	Name	To	Type
FW	Josep Samitier		
FW	Manuel Olivares	Donostia	
GK	Cayol		
MF	Villanueva	Valladolid	
MF	Sauto		
FW	Blazquez	Hércules FC	
MF	Arocha	Betis Balompié	
DF	Alonso	Real Zaragoza	

== Competitions ==
=== La Liga ===
==== League table ====
Pos	Team	Pld	W	D	L	GF	GA	GD	Pts	Relegation
1	Athletic Bilbao (C)	22	14	3	5	59	33	+26	31	
2	Madrid FC	22	13	3	6	62	35	+27	29	
3	Oviedo (Note: Due to the poor condition of their field at Buenavista after the Civil War, Oviedo did not enter the 1939–40 La Liga. It was decided to allow Oviedo one season to improve their pitch, automatically qualifying them to play the 1940–41 La Liga. A match between the two last qualified teams would determine the team that would occupy their spot.)	22	12	4	6	63	47	+16	28	Did not play the next season
4	Racing Santander	22	13	1	8	58	46	+12	27	
5	Barcelona	22	11	2	9	39	32	+7	24 (Note: Barcelona finished ahead of Hércules on head-to-head points: Hércules–Barcelona 2–2, Barcelona–Hércules 1–0.)	

Source: BDFútbol
Rules for classification: 1) points; 2) head-to-head points; 3) head-to-head goal difference; 4) goal difference; 5) number of goals scored.
(C) Champions

==== Results by round ====
Round	1	2	3	4	5	6	7	8	9	10	11	12	13	14	15	16	17	18	19	20	21	22
Ground	A	H	A	H	A	H	A	H	H	A	H	H	A	H	A	H	A	H	A	A	H	A
Result	W	W	W	W	L	L	W	W	W	L	W	W	L	W	W	D	L	W	L	W	D	D
Position	3	1	1	1	1	2	2	2	1	2	1	1	2	2	1	1	2	2	2	2	2	2

Source: Competitive matches
A = Away; H = Home; W = Win; D = Draw; L = Loss

==== Matches ====
10 November 1935 1	Hércules	0–1	Madrid FC	Alicante
		Report		Stadium: Bardin

17 November 1935 2	Madrid FC	6–0	Español	Chamartín de la Rosa
		Report		Stadium: Chamartín

24 November 1935 3	Atlético Madrid	2–3	Madrid FC	Madrid
		Report		Stadium: Metropolitano

1 December 1935 4	Madrid FC	4–1	Valencia	Chamartín de la Rosa
		Report		Stadium: Chamartín

8 December 1935 5	Sevilla Football Club	2–1	Madrid FC	Seville
		Report		Stadium: Nervión

15 December 1935 6	Madrid FC	2–4	Racing Santander	Chamartín de la Rosa
		Report		Stadium: Chamartín

22 December 1935 7	FC Barcelona	0–3	Madrid FC	Barcelona
		Report		Stadium: Camp de Les Corts

29 December 1935 8	Madrid FC	5–4	Oviedo	Chamartín de la Rosa
		Report		Stadium: Chamartín

5 January 1936 9	Madrid FC	6–2	Osasuna	Chamartín de la Rosa
		Report		Stadium: Chamartín

12 January 1936 10	Athletic Bilbao	1–0	Madrid FC	Bilbao
		Report		Stadium: San Mamés

26 January 1936 11	Madrid FC	5–1	Betis Balompié	Chamartín de la Rosa
		Report		Stadium: Chamartín

2 February 1936 12	Madrid FC	5–1	Hércules	Chamartín de la Rosa
		Report		Stadium: Chamartín

9 February 1936 13	Español	3–0	Madrid FC	Barcelona
		Report		Stadium: Sarria

16 February 1936 14	Madrid FC	3–1	Atlético Madrid	Chamartín de la Rosa
		Report		Stadium: Chamartín

1 March 1936 15	Valencia	1–2	Madrid FC	Valencia
		Report		Stadium: Mestalla

8 March 1936 16	Madrid FC	3–3	Sevilla Football Club	Chamartín de la Rosa
		Report		Stadium: Chamartín

15 March 1936 17	Racing Santander	4–3	Madrid FC	Santander
				Stadium: El Sardinero

22 March 1936 18	Madrid FC	3–0	FC Barcelona	Chamartín de la Rosa
		Report		Stadium: Chamartín

29 March 1936 19	Oviedo	1–0	Madrid FC	Oviedo
				Stadium: Buenavista

5 April 1936 20	Osasuna	1–4	Madrid FC	Pamplona

12 April 1936 21	Madrid FC	2–2	Athletic Club	Chamartín de la Rosa
		Report		Stadium: Chamartín

19 April 1936 22	Betis Balompie	1–1	Madrid FC	Seville
		Report

=== Copa del Presidente de la República ===
==== Final ====
21 June 1936	Madrid FC	2–1	FC Barcelona	Valencia
17:00 CET	Eugenio 6'; Lecue 12'	Report (in Spanish)	Escolà 29'	Stadium: Mestalla Stadium; Attendance: 22,000; Referee: Julio Ostalé

== Statistics ==
=== Player statistics ===
No.	Pos	Nat	Player	Total		La Liga		Copa		Regional Centro-Sur	
No.	Pos	Nat	Player	Apps	Goals	Apps	Goals	Apps	Goals	Apps	Goals
	GK	(Hungary) HUN	Alberty	17	-27	15	-24	2	-3		
	DF	(Spain) ESP	Jacinto Quincoces	26	0	19	0	7	0		
	DF	(Spain) ESP	Ciriaco Errasti	22	0	18	0	4	0		
	MF	(Spain) ESP	Pedro Regueiro	28	0	21	0	7	0		
	MF	(Spain) ESP	Antonio Bonet	28	0	20	0	8	0		
	MF	(Spain) ESP	Simon Lecue	27	14	19	9	8	5		
	MF	(Mexico) MEX	Sauto	23	0	16	0	7	0		
	FW	(Spain) ESP	Luis Regueiro	29	12	21	11	8	1		
	FW	(Spain) ESP	Emilin	29	12	21	8	8	4		
	FW	(Spain) ESP	Fernando Sañudo	29	30	21	21	8	9		
	FW	(Hungary) HUN	Kelemen	13	11	12	10	1	1		
	GK	(Spain) ESP	Ricardo Zamora	13	-16	7	-11	6	-5		
	FW	(Spain) ESP	Eugenio	14	2	7	0	7	2		
	MF	(Spain) ESP	Mardones	12	0	7	0	5	0		
	FW	(Spain) ESP	Hilario	6	0	6	0				
	MF	(Spain) ESP	Leoncito	8	0	6	0	2	0		
	FW	(Spain) ESP	Francisco Diz	3	2	3	2				
	MF	(Brazil) BRA	Fernando Giudicelli	1	0	1	0				
	DF	(Spain) ESP	Lopez Herranz	1	1	1	1				
	FW	(Spain) ESP	Mendez Vigo	1	0	1	0				
	MF	(Hungary) HUN	Buzassy	0	0	0	0				
