= 1929–30 Real Madrid CF season =

28th season in existence of Real Madrid CF

Real Madrid
1929–30 season
- President: Luis de Urquijo
- Manager: José Quirante
- La Liga: 5th
- Campeonato Regional Centro (Note: The Campeonato Regional Centro (Central Regional Championship) was a regional league used as a qualifier for the Copa del Rey.): 1st
- Copa del Rey: Runners-up
- Top goalscorer: League: Gaspar Rubio (19); All: Gaspar Rubio (27)
Home colours	Away colours

The 1929–30 season was Real Madrid Club de Fútbol's 28th season in existence, and their 2nd consecutive season in the Primera División. The club also played in the Campeonato Regional Centro (Central Regional Championship) and the Copa del Rey.

== First-team squad ==
Note: Flags indicate national team as defined under FIFA eligibility rules; some limited exceptions apply. Players may hold more than one non-FIFA nationality.

No.	Pos.	Nation	Player
—	GK	ESP	Rafael Vidal
—	GK	ESP	Ramón Nebot
—	DF	ESP	Félix Quesada
—	DF	ESP	José Torregrosa
—	MF	ESP	José María Peña
—	MF	ESP	Manuel Prats
—	MF	ESP	Desiderio Esparza
—	MF	ESP	Rafael Morera
—	MF	ESP	José Galé
—	MF	ESP	Lope Peña
—	MF	ESP	Cosme Vázquez

No.	Pos.	Nation	Player
—	MF	ESP	Manuel Cominges
—	MF	ESP	Luis Bergareche
—	MF	ESP	Francisco López
—	FW	ESP	Gaspar Rubio
—	FW	ESP	Luis Olaso
—	FW	ESP	Jaime Lazcano
—	FW	ESP	Evaristo San Miguel
—	FW	ESP	Gerónimo del Campo
—	FW	ESP	Ramón Triana
—	FW	ESP	Eugenio Moriones

== Transfers ==
=== In ===
Pos	Player	From
GK	(Spain) Ramón Nebot	(Spain) Castellón
DF	(Spain) José Torregrosa	(Spain) Alicante
MF	(Spain) Cosme Vázquez	(Spain) Atlético
MF	(Spain) José Galé	(Spain) Stadium Avilesino
MF	(Spain) Manuel Cominges	(Spain) Academy
MF	(Spain) Luis Bergareche	(Spain) Athletic Bilbao
FW	(Spain) Luis Olaso	(Spain) Atlético
FW	(Spain) Evaristo San Miguel	(Spain) Valladolid

=== Out ===
Pos	Player	From
GK	(Spain) José María Cabo	(Spain) Atlético
DF	(Spain) Juan Urquizu	(Spain) Athletic Bilbao
DF	(Spain) Luis de Uribe	(Spain) Athletic Bilbao
MF	(Spain) Rafael Lozano	(Spain)
MF	(Spain) José Cañavera	(Spain)
FW	(Spain) Juan Monjardín	(Spain)

== Friendlies ==
Kick Off	Opponents	H / A	Result	Scorers
1929-09-15	(Spain) Atlético	A	4–4	Bergareche (2), Moriones (2)
1929-11-01	(Spain) Sevilla	A	2–2	Rubio 50', 68'
1929-11-03	(Spain) Sevilla	A	2–2	López (2)
1929-11-13	(Spain) Deportivo	H	2–2	Bergareche (2)
1930-01-06	(Spain) Nacional	A	5–1	San Miguel (3), Morera (2)
1930-03-19	(Spain) Betis	A	4–0	Lazcano (2), Rubio (1), Vázquez (1)
1930-06-15	(Spain) Valencia	H	0–3	
1930-06-22	(Spain) Valencia	A	3–1	García de la Puerta (2), San Miguel (1)
1930-06-29	(Spain) Murcia	A	3–1	Vázquez (2), Lazcano (1)

== Competitions ==
=== Overview ===
Competition	First match	Last match	Starting round	Final position	Record							
Competition	First match	Last match	Starting round	Final position	Pld	W	D	L	GF	GA	GD	Win %
Campeonato Regional Centro	September 1929	November 1929	Matchday 1	Winners	8	5	1	2	24	12	+12	62.50
La Liga	1 December 1929	30 March 1930	Matchday 1	5th	18	7	3	8	45	42	+3	38.89
Copa del Rey	6 April 1930	1 June 1930	Round of 32	Runners-up	10	5	2	3	0	0	+0	50.00
Total					36	17	6	13	69	54	+15	47.22

Source: Competitions

=== La Liga ===
==== League table ====
Pos	Team	Pld	W	D	L	GF	GA	GD	Pts
3	Arenas	18	9	2	7	51	40	+11	20 (Note: Arenas finished ahead of Español on head-to-head goal difference: Arenas–Español 2–0, Español–Arenas 1–0)
4	Español	18	9	2	7	40	33	+7	20
5	Real Madrid	18	7	3	8	45	42	+3	17 (Note: Real Madrid finished ahead of Real Unión on overall goal difference.)
6	Real Unión	18	6	5	7	48	52	−4	17
7	Real Sociedad	18	5	4	9	34	37	−3	14 (Note: Real Sociedad finished ahead of Racing Santander on head-to-head goal difference: Real Sociedad–Racing Santander 7–0, Racing Santander–Real Sociedad 2–0)

Source: BDFútbol
Rules for classification: 1) points; 2) head-to-head points; 3) head-to-head goal difference; 4) goal difference; 5) number of goals scored.

==== Matches ====
Kick Off	Opponents	H / A	Result	Scorers
1929-12-01	Athletic Bilbao	A	1–2	Rubio 11'
1929-12-08	Real Unión	H	2–2	Rubio 5', Triana 35'
1929-12-15	Atlético	A	1–2	Rubio 80'
1929-12-22	Real Sociedad	A	0–4	
1929-12-29	Español	H	2–4	Galé 25', Olaso 74'
1930-01-05	Racing de Santander	H	6–0	Galé 2', Prats 4', San Miguel 5', Rubio 55', 60', Quesada 84'
1930-01-12	Europa	A	2–1	Rubio 7', 61'
1930-01-19	Arenas	H	5–2	Galé 10', 63', Lazcano 50', 76', Esparza 51',
1930-01-26	Barcelona	A	4–1	Rubio 10', 37', López 17', Lazcano 71'
1930-02-02	Athletic Bilbao	H	2–3	Lazcano 48', Rubio 85'
1930-02-09	Real Unión	A	2–2	Galé 38', Rubio 56'
1930-02-16	Atlético	H	4–1	Cominges 5', Rubio 35', 40', 43'
1930-02-23	Real Sociedad	H	1–1	Cominges 13'
1930-03-05	Español	A	1–8	Rubio 20'
1930-03-09	Racing de Santander	A	0–2	
1930-03-16	Europa	H	6–1	Rubio 23', 47', Lazcano 60', Vázquez 71', 82', Galé 75'
1930-03-23	Arenas	A	1–5	Llantada 15' (o.g.)
1930-03-30	Barcelona	H	5–1	Rubio 5', 23', Lazcano 42', 68', 72'

=== Campeonato Regional Centro ===
==== League table ====
Pos	Team	Pld	W	D	L	GF	GA	GD	Pts	Qualification
1	Real Madrid (C, Q)	8	5	1	2	24	12	+12	11	Qualification for the Copa del Rey.
2	Racing Madrid (Q)	8	3	4	1	20	14	+6	10	Qualification for the Copa del Rey.
3	Athletic Madrid (Q)	8	4	2	2	23	16	+7	10	Qualification for the Copa del Rey.
4	Nacional Madrid	8	3	2	3	19	21	−2	8	
5	Unión SC	8	0	1	7	9	32	−23	1	

Source: Rec.Sport.Soccer Statistics Foundation
Rules for classification: 1) points; 2) goal difference; 3) number of goals scored.
(C) Champions; (Q) Qualified for the phase indicated

==== Matches ====
Kick Off	Opponents	H / A	Result	Scorers
1928-09-16	Unión Sporting	N	5–2	Rubio 7', 8', 85', De Uribe 76', Lazcano 84'
1928-09-23	Racing de Madrid	H	4–1	De Uribe 20', 51', López 74', Rubio 85'
1928-10-07	Atlético	A	2–0	Rubio 60', Morera 75'
1928-10-14	Nacional	A	4–3	Lope Peña 15', Peña, Urquizu 84', Lazcano 87'
1928-10-28	Unión Sporting	A	4–0	De Uribe 10', 30', Morera 35', 88'
1928-11-04	Racing de Madrid	A	1–1	Morera 15'
1928-11-18	Atlético	H	3–1	Rubio, Triana 44', De Uribe 55'
1928-11-25	Nacional	H	7–0	Rubio (3), De Uribe (2), Lazcano (2)

=== Copa del Rey ===
Round	Kick Off	Opponents	H / A	Result	Scorers
R1 First Leg	1930-04-06	Patria Aragón	A	1–1	Morera 37'
R1 Second Leg	1930-04-13	Patria Aragón	H	1–1	Olaso 5'
R1 Tiebreaker	1930-04-15	Patria Aragón	H	6–1	Rubio (3), Lazcano (2), Olaso (1)
R2 First Leg	1930-04-20	Arenas	H	2–0	Lazcano 46', 60'
R2 Second Leg	1930-04-27	Arenas	A	2–0	Morera 9', Rubio 17'
QF First Leg	1930-05-04	Valencia	A	5–2	Rubio 10', 20', 85', Quesada 22' (pen), Vázquez 49'
QF Second Leg	1930-05-11	Valencia	H	0–2	
SF First Leg	1930-05-18	Español	N	0–1	
SF Second Leg	1930-05-22	Español	H	2–0	Vázquez 17', Rubio 70'
Final	1930-06-01	Athletic Bilbao	N	2–3	Lazcano 15', Triana 65'
