= 1933 Copa del Presidente de la República final =

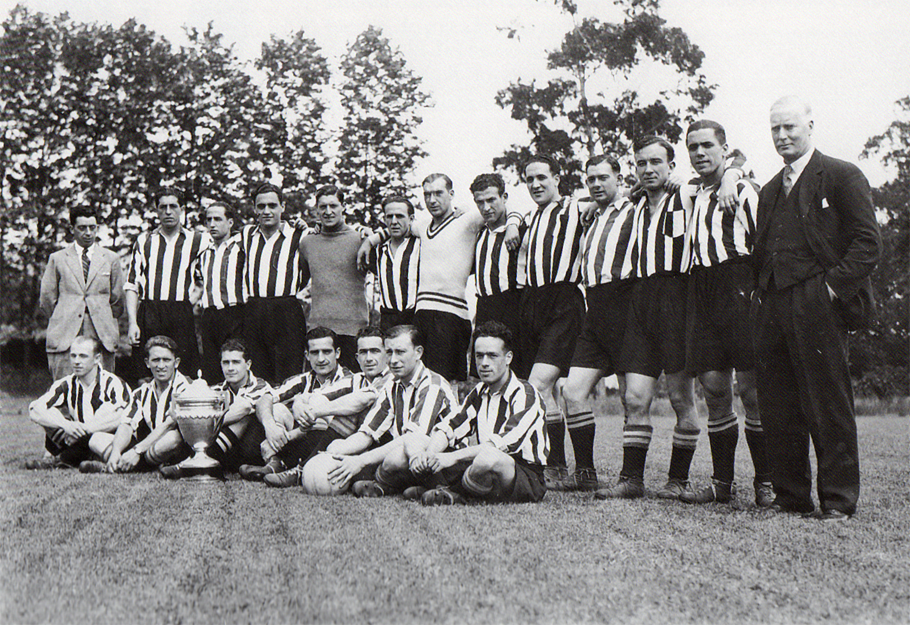
- Athletic Bilbao posing with the trophy
- Event: 1933 Copa del Rey
Athletic Bilbao	Madrid FC
2	1
- Date: June 25, 1933
- Venue: Montjuïc, Barcelona
- Referee: Jesús Arribas
- Attendance: 60,000

The 1933 Copa del Presidente de la República final was the 33rd final of the principal Spanish football cup competition, now known as the Copa del Rey. Athletic Bilbao beat Madrid FC 2–1 and won their 13th title, the fourth in a row.

== Road to the final ==
Athletic Bilbao			Round	Madrid FC
Opponent	Result	Legs	Knockout phase	Opponent	Result	Legs
Arenas Club	7–3	2–2 away; 5–1 home	Round of 32	Racing Santander	5–2	4–1 home; 1–1 away
Sevilla FC	7–2	2–1 away; 5–1 home	Round of 16	Unión Club	11–0	2–0 away; 9–0 home
Deportivo La Coruña	12–3	4–2 away; 8–1 home	Quarter-finals	Sporting Gijón	13–0	8–0 home; 5–0 away
CD Español	3–2	1–0 home; 2–1 away	Semi-finals	Valencia FC	6–2	3–1 home; 3–1 away

== Match details ==
25 June 1933
17:00 CET

Athletic Bilbao	2–1	Madrid CF
Gorostiza 73'; Lafuente 75'		Lazcano 23'

Montjuïc, Barcelona
Attendance: 60,000
Referee: Jesús Arribas

Athletic Bilbao	Madrid FC

GK	1	(Spain) Gregorio Blasco
DF	2	(Spain) José María Castellanos
DF	3	(Spain) Juan Urquizu
MF	4	(Spain) Leonardo Cilaurren
MF	5	(Spain) José Muguerza
MF	6	(Spain) Roberto Etxebarria
FW	7	(Spain) Lafuente (c)
FW	8	(Spain) José Iraragorri
FW	9	(Spain) Víctor Unamuno
FW	10	(Spain) Bata
FW	11	(Spain) Guillermo Gorostiza
Manager:
(England) Fred Pentland

GK	1	(Spain) Ricardo Zamora (c)
DF	2	(Spain) Ciriaco Errasti
DF	3	(Spain) Jacinto Quincoces
MF	4	(Spain) Pedro Regueiro
MF	5	(Spain) Luis Valle
MF	6	(Spain) Antonio Bonet
FW	7	(Spain) Eugenio Hilario
FW	8	(Spain) Luis Regueiro
FW	9	(Spain) Manuel Olivares
FW	10	(Spain) Hilario
FW	11	(Spain) Jaime Lazcano
Manager:
(England) Robert Firth

Copa del Rey 1933 winners
Athletic Bilbao
13th title

== See also ==
- El Viejo Clásico
