= 1932–33 Madrid FC season =

31st season in existence of Real Madrid CF

Madrid FC
1932–33 season
- President: Luis Usera Bugallal
- Manager: Robert Firth
- La Liga: 1st
- Campeonato Regional Mancomunado (Note: The Campeonato Regional Mancomunado (Joint Regional Championship) was a regional league used as a qualifier for the Copa del Presidente de la República.): 1st
- Copa del Rey: Runners-up
Home colours	Away colours

The 1932–33 season was Madrid Football Club's 31st season in existence, and their 5th consecutive season in the Primera División. The club also played in the Campeonato Regional Mancomunado (Joint Regional Championship) and the Copa del Presidente de la República (renamed Copa del Rey after the arrival of the Second Spanish Republic).

Madrid FC secured their second consecutive Primera División title, equaling Athletic Bilbao for most La Liga title wins, and were close to clinching the domestic double, but lost in the Copa final to Athletic 1–2.

== Friendlies ==
3 July 1932 Friendly	FC Barcelona	2–2	Madrid FC	Barcelona
		Report		Stadium: Camp de Les Corts

10 July 1932 Friendly	CD Tenerife	0–0	Madrid FC	Tenerife
		Report

16 July 1932 Friendly	CD Tenerife	1–0	Madrid FC	Tenerife
		Report

17 July 1932 Friendly	CD Tenerife	2–1	Madrid FC	Tenerife
		Report

24 July 1932 Friendly	Marino FC	2–2	Madrid FC	Las Palmas
		Report		Stadium: Campo España

25 July 1932 Friendly	RC Victoria	1–2	Madrid FC	Las Palmas
		Report		Stadium: Campo España

31 July 1932 Friendly	Marino FC	0–0	Madrid FC	Las Palmas
		Report		Stadium: Campo España

4 August 1932 Friendly	RC Victoria	1–3	Madrid FC	Las Palmas
		Report		Stadium: Campo España

9 September 1932 Friendly	Betis Balompié	0–2	Madrid FC	Ayamonte
		Report		Stadium: Cardenio

11 September 1932 Friendly	Betis Balompié	4–5	Madrid FC	Ayamonte
		Report		Stadium: Cardenio

18 September 1932 Friendly	Hércules CF	0–2	Madrid FC	Alicante
		Report		Stadium: El Bardin

== Competitions ==
=== La Liga ===
==== League table ====
Pos	Team	Pld	W	D	L	GF	GA	GD	Pts
1	Madrid FC (C)	18	13	2	3	49	17	+32	28
2	Athletic Bilbao	18	13	0	5	63	30	+33	26
3	Español	18	10	2	6	33	30	+3	22
4	Barcelona	18	7	5	6	42	34	+8	19
5	Betis	18	6	5	7	31	45	−14	17

Source: BDFútbol
Rules for classification: 1) points; 2) head-to-head points; 3) head-to-head goal difference; 4) goal difference; 5) number of goals scored.
(C) Champions
