= Emilín (footballer, born May 1912) =

Spanish footballer (1912–1989)

Personal information
- Full name: Emilio Alonso Larrazabal
- Date of birth: 25 May 1912
- Place of birth: Las Arenas, Biscay, Spain
- Date of death: 29 December 1989 (aged 77)
- Place of death: Mexico
- Height: 1.74 m (5 ft 9 in)
- Position: Forward

Senior career*
Years	Team	Apps	(Gls)
1929–1933	Arenas Club de Getxo	44	(13)
1933–1936	Real Madrid	42	(16)
1938–1939	Euzkadi	8	(2)
1939–1940	San Lorenzo	1	(0)
1940–1942	Real Club España		

International career
1936	Spain	2	(0)
1937–1938	Basque Country	33	(3)
- * Club domestic league appearances and goals

Emilio Alonso Larrazabal (Basque: [em'ilio alon's̺o laɾas̻a'bal]) often known as Emilín, (25 May 1912 – 29 December 1989) was a Basque footballer from the north of Spain who played as a forward.

== Career ==
Alonso began his career at Arenas Club de Getxo in 1929. At the age of 21 he was known as one of the best forwards in Spanish football. He joined Real Madrid in 1933, which at that time was called the Madrid Foot-ball Club, and had the luck to play with other great players like Zamora, Ciriaco, Quincoces, Luis Regueiro, Pedro Regueiro, Lazcano, Lecue, Sañudo, Leoncito and Esparza, who together formed one of the best teams ever in Real Madrid's history. With this team Emilin won the La Liga twice. He played for Real Madrid for three years between 1933 and 1936, scoring 16 goals in 42 official matches.

He was selected to play for the Spain national team on two occasions in 1936. His first match for Spain took place in Madrid, against Austria, and his second against Germany, in Barcelona.

In 1937 La Liga was suspended due to the Spanish Civil War. In its place Alonso was chosen to be part of the Basque Country national team for its tour of Europe. Later, in the 1938–39 season, he played for CD Euzkadi in Mexico, before moving to San Lorenzo de Almagro in Argentina for the 1939–40 season. In 1940 he returned to Mexico to join Club España. Later he became the team's technical director.

== Personal life ==
Alonso was born in Las Arenas, Biscay, in the Basque Country in northern Spain.

He married Carmela González in Mexico and had three children, Emilio, Mayo and Ricardo. After retiring from football he became the owner of a printing company in Mexico City.

His brother Santos Alonso Larrazabal was also a professional footballer.

== Honours ==
Real Madrid

- Two Copa del Rey
- Six Campeonato Mancomunados
