= 1935–36 Campeonato Mancomunado Castilla-Aragón =

1936 Mancomunado Castilla-Aragón
Tournament details
- Country: Spain
- Dates: 1 September – 3 November
- Teams: 6

Final positions
- Champions: Madrid CF (23rd title)
- Runners-up: Real Zaragoza

Tournament statistics
- Matches played: 30
- Goals scored: 119 (3.97 per match)

The 1935–36 Campeonato Mancomunado Castilla-Aragón (English: 1935–36 Castilla-Aragón Joint Championship) was a football competition for clubs based primarily in the Castile region of Spain, including the Community of Madrid, played between 1 September and 3 November 1939. It was organized by the football federations of Spain's central zone (Castilla) and Aragón, hence the name. This tournament was held in the form of a round-robin league and had a total of 30 matches.

It was the fifth joint championship of the Campeonato Regional Centro, after the Centro-Aragón in 1931–32, Centro-Sur in 1932–33 and 1933–34, and Castilla-Aragón in 1934–35, and it was the last before the outbreak of the Spanish Civil War.

== Tournament ==
Madrid won with one more point over Real Zaragoza.

== League table ==
Pos	Team	Pld	W	D	L	GF	GA	GD	Pts	Qualification
1	Madrid FC	10	6	3	1	23	8	+15	15	Qualification for the Copa del Rey.
2	Zaragoza	10	7	0	3	21	8	+13	14	Qualification for the Copa del Rey.
3	Athletic de Madrid	10	5	0	5	22	21	+1	10	Qualification for the Copa del Rey.
4	Racing Santander	10	4	1	5	19	26	−7	9	Qualification for the Copa del Rey.
5	Nacional Madrid	10	3	1	6	17	27	−10	7	Qualification for the Copa del Rey.
6	Valladolid	10	2	1	7	17	29	−12	5	Qualification for the Copa del Rey.

Source: BDFutbol

== See also ==
- 1935–36 Madrid FC season
