= Robert Firth (footballer) =

English footballer and manager

- Firth in a Port Vale squad photo in 1921

Personal information
- Full name: Robert Edwin Firth
- Date of birth: 20 February 1887
- Place of birth: Sheldon, Birmingham, England
- Date of death: 1966 (aged 78–79)
- Height: 5 ft 9 1/2 in (1.77 m)
- Position: Outside right

Youth career
- Birmingham Corporation Transport
- Golders Green

Senior career*
Years	Team	Apps	(Gls)
1909–1911	Birmingham	25	(2)
1911	Wellington Town		
1911–1921	Nottingham Forest	141	(14)
1921–1922	Port Vale	39	(5)
1922–1923	Southend United	37	(1)
Total		242	(22)

Managerial career
- 1930–1932: Racing de Santander
- 1932–1934: Real Madrid
- * Club domestic league appearances and goals

Robert Edwin Firth (20 February 1887 – 1966) was an English footballer who played for Birmingham, Wellington Town, Nottingham Forest, Port Vale, and Southend United. He scored 22 goals from 242 appearances in the Football League. He later coached Spanish La Liga teams Racing de Santander and Real Madrid, leading Santander to a second-place finish in 1930–31 and Madrid to two Campeonato Regional Centro titles and a first-place finish in La Liga in 1932–33 and a second-place finish in 1933–34.

== Playing career ==
Firth played for Birmingham Corporation Transport and Golders Green before joining Birmingham. He played nine Second Division and FA Cup games in the 1909–10 season. He scored his first goal in the Football League on 10 December 1910, in a 1–0 win over Lincoln City at Sincil Bank, and went on to score two goals in 18 appearances in the 1910–11 campaign. After leaving St Andrew's, he played for Wellington Town and Nottingham Forest, before joining Port Vale in June 1921 after serving in the Royal Field Artillery during the First World War. He claimed his first goal for the club on 29 August, in a 3–0 win over Clapton Orient at the Old Recreation Ground. He went on to score five goals in 39 Second Division games in the 1921–22 season. He was a member of the side which shared the North Staffordshire Infirmary Cup in 1922. However, he was released at the end of the season and moved on to Southend United.

== Coaching career ==
He coached Racing de Santander from 1930 to 1932. He led Santander to second in La Liga in 1930–31, behind champions Athletic Bilbao on goal difference. They went on to finish the 1931–32 season in fourth place. Firth then swapped the Estadio El Sardinero for Real Madrid. He spent two seasons in charge at Estadio Chamartín, leading Madrid to the league title in 1932–33, before leaving them after a second-place finish in 1933–34. He also led the club to two successive Campeonato Regional Centro victories. He also took Madrid to the 1933 final of the Copa del Presidente de la República, which ended in a 2–1 defeat to Athletic Bilbao at the Estadi Olímpic Lluís Companys.

== Career statistics ==
Appearances and goals by club, season and competition
Club	Season	League			FA Cup		Total	
Club	Season	Division	Apps	Goals	Apps	Goals	Apps	Goals
Birmingham	1909–10	Second Division	8	0	1	0	9	0
Birmingham	1910–11	Second Division	17	2	1	0	18	2
Birmingham	Total		25	2	2	0	27	2
Nottingham Forest	1911–12	Second Division	31	4	1	0	32	4
Nottingham Forest	1912–13	Second Division	25	1	1	0	26	1
Nottingham Forest	1913–14	Second Division	37	6	2	0	39	6
Nottingham Forest	1919–20	Second Division	30	2	1	0	31	2
Nottingham Forest	1920–21	Second Division	18	1	0	0	18	1
Nottingham Forest	Total		141	14	5	0	146	14
Port Vale	1921–22	Second Division	39	5	1	0	40	5
Southend United	1922–23	Third Division South	37	1	4	1	41	2
Career total			242	22	12	1	254	23

== Honours ==
Port Vale

- North Staffordshire Infirmary Cup: 1922 (shared)

Real Madrid

- La Liga: 1932–33
- Campeonato Regional Centro: 1933, 1934
