= José Iborra =

Spanish footballer (1908–2002)

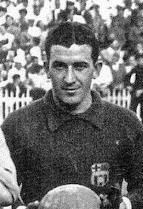

Personal information
- Full name: José Iborra Blanco
- Date of birth: 12 June 1908
- Place of birth: Barcelona, Spain
- Date of death: 17 September 2002 (aged 94)
- Position: Goalkeeper

Senior career*
Years	Team	Apps	(Gls)
?	Lleida		
?	Girona		
1935–37	Barcelona	16	
1938–43	Real Club España		
1944–48	Puebla	210	
- * Club domestic league appearances and goals

José Iborra Blanco (12 June 1908 – 17 September 2002) was a Spanish football player. He played for FC Barcelona in 1935-36, Due to the Spanish revolution of 1936 he among others fled the country to Mexico. In 1938 he arrive in Mexico and quickly signed with Mexican club Real Club España which was mostly Spanish players. In 1943 he was contacted by Joaquín Díaz Loredo and Alfonso Sobero owners of the newly formed club Puebla. He would help Puebla win their first tournament in 1945 winning the Copa Mexico. He would go on to play for 4 years with Puebla playing over 200 games. He died on September 17, 2002, at the age of 94. At the time of his death he was the last living Spanish player who had fled the 1936 Spanish revolution.
