= José María Castellanos =

Spanish engineer, footballer, and tennis player

Personal information
- Full name: José María Castellanos Ledo
- Date of birth: 8 April 1909
- Place of birth: Bilbao, Spain
- Date of death: 21 July 1973 (aged 64)
- Place of death: Bilbao, Spain
- Position: Defender

Senior career*
Years	Team	Apps	(Gls)
1928–1934	Athletic Bilbao	79	(0)
- * Club domestic league appearances and goals

José María Castellanos Ledo (8 April 1909 – 21 July 1973), nicknamed Chitín, was a Spanish engineer and footballer who played as a defender for Athletic Bilbao. He spent his entire career at Athletic, his hometown club, being a member of the great side coached by Fred Pentland that won two La Ligas and three Copa del Rey titles in the early 1930s.

His father, Manuel, was president of the club between 1929 and 1933.

== Playing career ==
José Maria Castellanos was born on 8 April 1909 in Bilbao, Biscay, and began his footballing career at his hometown club Athletic Bilbao in 1928, at the age of 19, shortly before his father Manuel became the club's president in 1929. He made his official debut in a Biscay Regional Championship match against Barakaldo CF on 30 September 1928, helping his side to a 4–0 win. He played in the inaugural season of La Liga in 1929, making his debut on its second matchday against RCD Espanyol on 17 February 1929, helping his side to a 9–0 win.

Castellanos played a crucial role in helping Fred Pentland's Athletic win two La Ligas and four Copa del Rey titles, starting in all of the four consecutive Cup finals won between 1930 and 1933, sharing this feat with Gregorio Blasco, José Muguerza, José Iraragorri, Bata and Guillermo Gorostiza. He was also part of the first team to win the league unbeaten in 1930, with 12 wins and 6 draws. In total, he played 149 official matches for Athletic; 80 in the League, 34 in the Cup, 35 in the Regional Championship.

== Later life ==
After he retired from football, Castellanos fell in love with the sport of tennis, a passion that his son José María Castellanos Dueñas also inherited; in fact, the Euskadi Absolute Tennis Championship is named after both. He was also a president of the tennis federation of the South Basque Country.

Having studied Industrial Engineering, he dedicated himself professionally to working in the Altos Hornos de Vizcaya, which was the largest company in Spain for much of the 20th century, employing 40,000 workers at its height.

== Death ==
Castellanos died in Bilbao on 21 July 1973, at the age of 64.

== Honours ==
Athletic Bilbao

- La Liga: 1929–30, 1930–31, 1933–34
- Copa del Rey: 1930, 1931, 1932, 1933
- Biscay Championship (5): 1929, 1931, 1932, 1933, 1934
