= Francisco Diz =

Spanish footballer (1910–1967)

Personal information
- Full name: Francisco Diz Vázquez
- Date of birth: 9 September 1910
- Place of birth: A Coruña, Spain
- Date of death: 16 April 1967 (aged 56)
- Place of death: Spain
- Position: Forward

Senior career*
Years	Team	Apps	(Gls)
1928–1929	Europa FC		
1929–1930	Emden		
1930–1934	Deportivo de La Coruña		
1934–1936	Real Madrid		
1937	Deportivo de La Coruña		
- * Club domestic league appearances and goals

Francisco Diz Vázquez (9 September 1910 – 16 April 1967) was a Spanish footballer who played as a forward for Deportivo de La Coruña and Real Madrid in the 1930s.

== Playing career ==
Born on 9 September 1910 in A Coruña, Diz began his football career at his hometown club Europa FC (currently known as Orzán), before moving to Emden, with whom he played in the Tercera División in the 1929–30 season.

At the end of the season, the 20-year-old signed for Deportivo de La Coruña, where he formed a renowned left wing alongside Chacho, which played a crucial role in helping Deportivo win two Galician Championships in 1931 and 1933. On 4 January 1931, he made his Segunda División debut in a defeat against Real Betis in Seville. He and Chacho soon stood out from the rest, thus becoming highly valued players sought after by the big clubs, including FC Barcelona, so in July 1934, they travelled to the Catalan capital to play some test matches, including two friendlies against the Brazilian national team and Real Unión, helping his side to a 4–4 draw and a 4–2 win respectively. Some other clubs also showed interest, such as Celta de Vigo and Atlético Madrid, but in the end, it was Real Madrid who signed the player, closing the transfer for 10,000 pesetas to Deportivo.

In 1934, Diz signed for Real Madrid, where he played for two years, scoring a total of 2 goals in 12 official matches, including two goals in 9 La Liga matches, and helping them win two regional championships in 1935 and 1936, as well as the 1936 Copa del Presidente de la República, although he did not play in the final, in which Madrid defeated Barcelona 2–1. By the time Barça attempted to sign him, Diz was earning 1,000 pesetas a month at Madrid.

Diz arrived in A Coruña on vacation just three days before the outbreak of the Spanish Civil War, thus getting stuck there and returning to play for Deportivo, with whom he won his third Galician Championship, securing the title on the last matchday, in which they drew in Lugo. During the match, however, he sustained a serious injury when a boot cleats from an opposing player drove into his shin, but despite undergoing surgery in Santiago de Compostela, the injury worsened, which forced him to retire.

== Later life and death ==
After his retirement, Diz lived in poverty, being only able to afford his hospital stays thanks to donations from football fans and charity matches.

On 16 April 1967, the 56-year-old Diz was watching a football match between Córdoba and Hércules on television in the hospital in Santiago de Compostela, where he had been admitted for cancer in his leg, when he died of a heart attack.

== Honours ==
Deportivo de La Coruña

- Galician Championships:
  - Champions (3): 1931, 1933, and 1937

Real Madrid

- Madrid Championships
  - Champions (2): 1934–35 and 1935–36
- Copa del Rey:
  - Champions (1): 1936

== See also ==
- List of Real Madrid CF players
