= Mariano García de la Puerta =

Spanish footballer

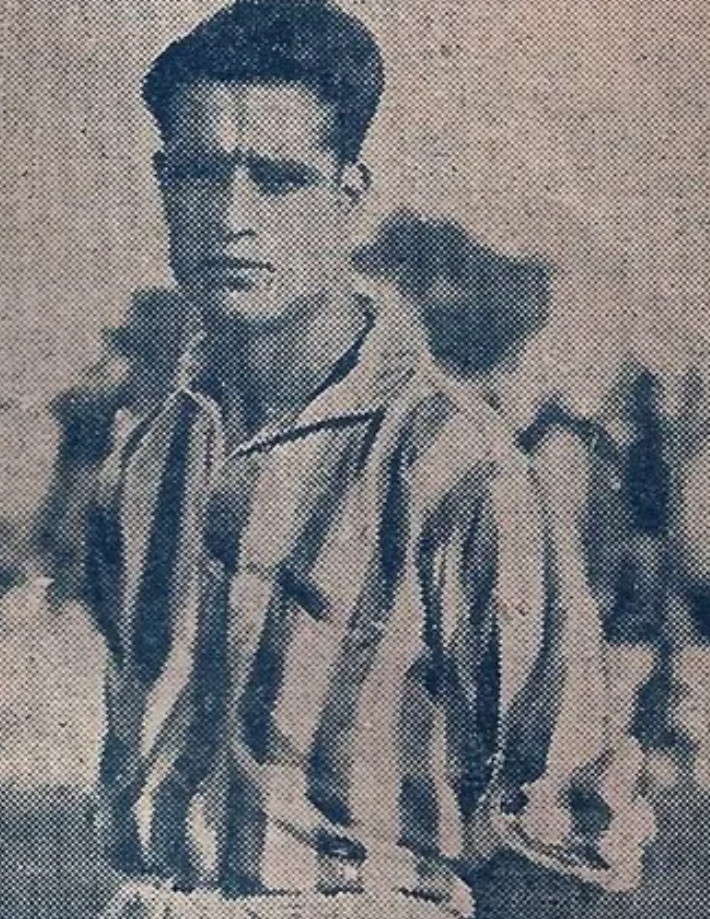
- García de la Puerta with Betis

Personal information
- Full name: Mariano Rafael Eduardo Balbino García de la Puerta
- Date of birth: 31 May 1907
- Place of birth: Barcelona, Spain
- Date of death: unknown
- Place of death: Spain
- Position: Forward

Senior career*
Years	Team	Apps	(Gls)
1927–1930	Real Murcia	29	(22)
1930–1931	Real Madrid	8	(2)
1931–1934	Real Betis	13	(7)
1934–1935	Nacional de Madrid	9	(6)
1935–1936	Real Murcia	8	(4)
1939–1940	Ferroviaria		
1939–1940	Mallorca	7	(2)
Total		74	(43)
- * Club domestic league appearances and goals

Mariano Rafael Eduardo Balbino García de la Puerta (31 May 1907 – unknown) was a Spanish footballer who played as a forward for Real Madrid and Real Betis in the 1930s.

== Playing career ==
=== Early career ===
Mariano García de la Puerta was born on 31 May 1907 in Barcelona, Catalonia, but it was in Murcia where he began his football career, joining the ranks of Real Murcia in 1927, aged, with whom he played for three years, until 1930. In his last season at the club, he set the club record for the most goals in a single Copa del Rey match when he scored a five-goal haul in a 10–0 victory over Don Benito in the round of 32 of the 1930 Copa del Rey on 6 April at La Condomina, although some sources state that he scored six. Perhaps because of his cup exploits, he was then signed by Real Madrid, with whom he played for just a single season, scoring 10 goals in 16 official matches, including four goals in as many regional championship matches, four goals in as many cup matches, but only 2 goals in 18 La Liga matches. He arrived in Madrid at the same time as the great goalkeeper Ricardo Zamora.

=== Real Betis ===
In 1931, García de la Puerta signed for the Segunda División team Real Betis, making his official debut for the club in a Andalusian championship match against Córdoba on 11 October 1931, which ended in a goalless draw. Two months later, on 20 December 1931, he scored a hat-trick to help his side to a 3–2 victory over city rivals Sevilla, which was Betis' first-ever league win at Sevilla's ground; he netted the first goal of the night after collecting a rebound off the crossbar. Together with Enrique Soladrero, Rosendo Romero, Andrés Aranda under coach Emilio Sampere, he was a part of the Betis team that won the 1931–32 Segunda División and achieved promotion to La Liga; he was the team's third highest scorer with 8 goals, only behind Romero's 9 and Adolfo Martín's 12.

His great technical quality was often overshadowed by his indiscipline and eccentricity off the field; for instance, on one occasion after a match against Atlético Madrid, García de la Puerta arrived at the train carrying a sack containing a 20-kilogram pig, which had been gifted to him by his friends in the capital, and which was later released by a teammate, so he had to chase him down through the corridors of the luxury carriage, causing both panic and hilarity among the other passengers; when the ticket inspector threatened with arresting him if he refused to hand over the animal, he opened a window and threw it onto the track. He enjoyed playing in front of the kids, and "no matter how much the club's directors begged him, either the kids came in or he didn't play". On another occasion, in a regional championship match against Sevilla on 22 October 1933, he strolled around for most of the match, which sparked a heated debate between him and teammate Timimi, so as soon as García de la Puerta got hold of the ball again, he dribbled past half of the Sevilla team and placed himself in position to deliver the killer pass to Timimi or shoot at goal, but instead he deliberately flicked out with his heel and put the ball out of play; the match ended in a 2–2 draw, and he never wore the Betis shirt again.

=== Later career ===
In May 1934, García de la Puerta played two friendly matches against Wiener SC, helping his side to two victories. He then returned to Murcia in 1935, but his career there was interrupted by the outbreak of the Spanish Civil War. Once the War was over he briefly played for Ferroviaria and Mallorca in the 1939–1940 season.

== Honours ==
Real Madrid

- Centro Championship:
  - Champions: 1930–31

Real Betis

- Segunda División
  - Champions: 1931–32
