= Lafuente (footballer, born 1907) =

Spanish footballer

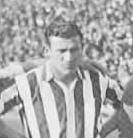
- Lafuente in 1931

Personal information
- Full name: Ramón de la Fuente Leal
- Date of birth: 31 December 1907
- Place of birth: Bilbao, Spain
- Date of death: 15 September 1973 (aged 65)
- Place of death: Madrid, Spain
- Position: Forward

Senior career*
Years	Team	Apps	(Gls)
1923–1926	Barakaldo CF	0	(0)
1926–1934	Athletic Bilbao	96	(24)
1934–1936	Atlético Madrid	20	(1)

International career
1927–1935	Spain	8	(0)

Managerial career
- 1943–1945: Deportivo de La Coruña
- * Club domestic league appearances and goals

Ramón de la Fuente Leal, nicknamed Lafuente (31 December 1907 – 15 September 1973) was a Spanish footballer who played as a forward for Athletic Bilbao, Atlético Madrid and the Spain national team.

== Club career ==
He was born in Bilbao. Lafuente began his sporting career in the ranks of Barakaldo CF in 1924, at the age of just 16 years old. At Barakaldo, he stood out as an extraordinary forward, which eventually earned him a move to Athletic Bilbao in 1926, with whom he played for nine seasons. In 1928 he was one of the members of the Athletic Bilbao team that played in the first season of the Spanish Football League. At Bilbao, he was the most experienced member of what became a famous and successful forward line, along with José Iraragorri, Chirri II, Bata and Guillermo Gorostiza. The highlight of his career was scoring the winning goal of the 1930 Copa del Rey Final against Real Madrid in extra-time in a 3–1 win. In the Bilbao ranks he played a total of 211 official matches (96 in the League, 56 in the Cup and 59 in the Regional Championship), scoring a total of 64 goals (26 in the League, 17 in the Cup and 21 in the Regional Championship). In total, he won three Leagues and four Cups, forming part of the club's first historical striker.

In 1934 he signed for Atlético de Madrid (then Athletic de Madrid), with whom he played his last La Liga season, playing 20 games and scoring just one goal. His career was cut short prematurely in the second leg of the 1935 Copa del Presidente de la República quarter-final tie between Madrid and Sevilla FC, when a clash with goalkeeper Guillermo Eizaguirre caused Lafuente to fracture his tibia and fibula. The player did not heal well from the injury and was unable to play during the following season. When the Spanish Civil War broke out in the summer of 1936, Lafuente was still 28 years old, but by then he was already in transition to coaching.

== International career ==
He earned 8 caps for the Spain national team, and participated in Spain's first-ever World Cup in 1934, which ended in a quarter-final exit to the eventual champions Italy.

== Managerial career ==
As a coach, he managed Atlético Aviación during the first ten days of the 1940–41 season, while Ricardo Zamora was arrested and disqualified. Between 1943 and 1945, he coached Deportivo de La Coruña.

He died in Madrid on 15 September 1973 at the age of 65.

== Honours ==
- La Liga: 1929–30, 1930–31, 1933–34
- Copa del Rey: 1930, 1931, 1932, 1933
- Biscay Championship: 1926–27, 1927–28, 1928–29, 1930–31, 1931–32, 1932–33, 1933–34
