= Galician Amateur Championship =

- Organiser(s): Royal Galician Football Federation
- Founded: 1931
- Abolished: 1981
- Region: Spain

The Galician Amateur Championship was a football competition contested by non-professional Galician clubs that ran from 1931 until 1981. It was organized by Royal Galician Football Federation.

== History ==
The first edition of the tournament was held in 1931, under the name Campionato Galego Amateur, with the winner earning a place in the Spanish Amateur Championship. The winner of the tournament was Club Ciosvín de Vigo, who would also win the national championship that same season.

The tournament was interrupted during the Spanish Civil War, returning at the end of it with the name Campionato Galego de Afeccionados.

=== Galician Amateur Championship ===
Season	Champion
1930–31	Club Ciosvín
1931–32	Club Ciosvín
1932–33	Eiriña
1933–34	Eiriña
1934–35	Club Ciosvín
1935–36	Chao Sporting

=== Galician Amateur Championship ===
Season	Champion
1940–41	Club Coruña
1941–42	Pontevedra CF
1942–43	Pontevedra CF
1943–44	Club Lemos
1944–45	Club Berbés
1945–46	Club Turista
1946–47	Non se disputou
1947–48	Club Turista
1948–49	Zeltia Deportiva Porriño
1949–50	Club Turista
1950–51	Club Turista
1951–52	Marín
1952–53	Club Turista
1953–54	Deportivo Fabril
1954–55	Non se disputou
1955–56	Non se disputou

Season	Champion
1956–57	CD Choco
1957–58	CD Choco
1958–59	Zeltia Deportiva Porriño
1959–60	CD Lugo
1960–61	CD Lugo
1961–62	Pontevedra CF B^{(*)}
1962–63	CD Choco
1963–64	Orzán SD
1964–65	Rápido de Bouzas
1965–66	Alondras
1966–67	Atlético Pontevedrés
1967–68	Orzán SD
1968–69	CD Ourense
1969–70	Galicia Gaiteira
1970–71	Cultural Maniños
1971–72	Gran Peña

Season	Champion
1972–73	Alondras
1973–74	CCRD Perlío
1974–75	Noia SD
1975–76	CCRD Perlío
1976–77	Alondras
1977–78	Galicia de Mugardos
1978–79	Villalonga
1979–80	Sporting Ciudad
1980–81	Racing de Castrelos
1981–82	Orillamar SD
1982–83	Vioño CF
1983–84	Racing de Castrelos
1984–85	Rápido de Bouzas
1985–86	Orillamar SD
1986–87	Imperátor OAR

^{(*)} The current Pontevedra CF B is later, since it was founded in 1965 under the name of Atlético Pontevedrés

== Winners ==
Position	Team	Titles	Years
1	Club Turista	5	1945–46, 1947–48, 1949–50, 1950–51, 1952–53
2	Club Ciosvín	3	1930–31, 1931–32, 1934–35
...	CD Choco	3	1956–57, 1957–58, 1962–63
...	Alondras	3	1965–66, 1972–73, 1976–77
5	Eiriña	2	1932–33, 1933–34
...	Pontevedra CF	2	1941–42, 1942–43
...	Zeltia Deportiva Porriño	2	1948–49, 1958–59
...	CD Lugo	2	1959–60, 1960–61
...	Orzán SD	2	1963–64, 1967–68
...	Rápido de Bouzas	2	1964–65, 1984–85
...	CCRD Perlío	2	1973–74, 1975–76
...	Racing de Castrelos	2	1980–81, 1983–84
...	Orillamar SD	2	1981–82, 1985–86
14	Chao Sporting	1	1935–36
...	Club Coruña	1	1940–41
...	Club Lemos	1	1943–44
...	Club Berbés	1	1944–45
...	Marín	1	1951–52
...	Deportivo Fabril	1	1953–54
...	Pontevedra CF B^{(*)}	1	1961–62
...	Atlético Pontevedrés	1	1966–67
...	CD Ourense	1	1968–69
...	Galicia Gaiteira	1	1969–70
...	Cultural Maniños	1	1970–71
...	Gran Peña	1	1971–72
...	Noia SD	1	1974–75
...	Galicia de Mugardos	1	1977–78
...	Villalonga	1	1978–79
...	Sporting Ciudad	1	1979–80
...	Vioño CF	1	1982–83
...	Imperátor OAR	1	1986–87

== See also ==
- Galician Championship
- Galicia official football team
