= Rafael Morera =

Spanish footballer

Rafael Morera López (born 1 November 1903 in Lanzarote, died 1981), known as Morera, was a Spanish professional association football player. He played with most of his career at Real Madrid C.F.

He played his career as a forward.

He scored 7 goals in 28 matches in La Liga, and 11 goals in 17 matches in Copa del Rey. He also scored the first official league goal in El Clasico history, scoring in the tenth minute for Real Madrid in Barcelona on February 17, 1929.

== Club ==
Club	Season	League		Cup		Total	
Club	Season	Matches	Goals	Matches	Goals	Matches	Goals
(Spain) Real Madrid C.F.	1928-31	28	7	17	11	45	18
