= Luis Olaso =

Spanish footballer (1900–1981)

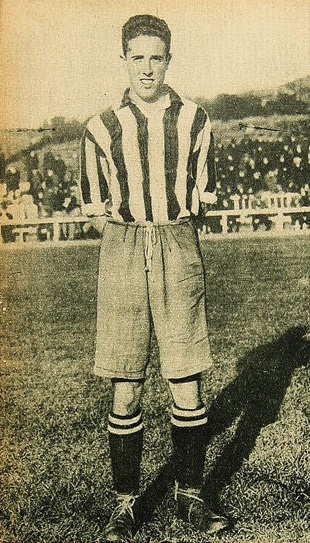
- Olaso in 1927

Personal information
- Full name: Luis Olaso Anabitarte
- Date of birth: 15 August 1900
- Place of birth: Villabona, Guipúzcoa, Spain
- Date of death: 6 December 1981 (aged 81)
- Position: Midfielder

Senior career*
Years	Team	Apps	(Gls)
1919–1929	Atlético de Madrid	13	(2)
1929–1933	Real Madrid	43	(8)

International career
1921–1927	Spain	4	(1)
- * Club domestic league appearances and goals

Luis Olaso Anabitarte (15 August 1900 – 6 December 1981) was a Spanish footballer who played as a midfielder. Born in Villabona, Guipúzcoa, Olaso played for Atlético Madrid and Real Madrid. He played four matches for the Spain national team from 1921 to 1927, scoring one goal. His brother Alfonso also played for Atlético and Spain in the same period.

== Honours ==
Atlético Madrid

- Campeonato Regional Centro: 1920–21, 1924–25, 1927–28

Real Madrid

- Campeonato Regional Centro: 1929–30, 1930–31, 1931–32, 1932–33
- La Liga: 1931–32, 1932–33
