= Cosme Vázquez =

Spanish footballer

Personal information
- Full name: Cosme Vázquez Subiabre
- Date of birth: 15 January 1904
- Place of birth: Mondariz, Galicia, Spain
- Date of death: 27 August 1976 (aged 72)
- Place of death: Madrid, Spain
- Position: Center-forward

Senior career*
Years	Team	Apps	(Gls)
1922–1923	Real Vigo Sporting		
1923–1925	Celta de Vigo		
1925–1929	Atlético Madrid		
1929–1931	Real Madrid		

International career
1922–1923	Spain		
- * Club domestic league appearances and goals

Cosme Vázquez Subiabre (15 January 1904 - 27 August 1976), nicknamed "Ángel de Madrid" was a Spanish footballer who played as a center-forward. He played for the main Madrid teams at the time, Atlético Madrid and Real Madrid.
