= Campo del Patronato Obrero =

Multi-use stadium in Seville, Spain

- Full name: Campo del Patronato Obrero
- Location: Seville, Spain
- Capacity: 19,000

Construction
- Opened: 1 November 1918
- Expanded: 1924, 1928
- Closed: 1974

Tenants
- Real Betis (1918–1936)

Campo del Patronato Obrero was a multi-use stadium in Seville, Spain. It was initially used as the stadium of Real Betis. It was replaced by Estadio Benito Villamarín in 1929, with Betis officially moved into the site in 1936. The capacity of the stadium was 19,000 spectators.

== History ==
Upon Real Betis' formation, the club played at the Campo del Huerto de Mariana. In 1909, Betis moved to the Campo del Prado de Santa Justa, moving to the Campo del Prado de San Sebastián, sharing the site with rivals Sevilla two years later. In 1918, Real Betis moved to the Campo del Patronato Obrero, with the first game at the ground coming against rivals Sevilla on 1 November 1918, resulting in a 5–1 loss for Real Betis. During the 1920s, the ground was redeveloped numerous times by club president Ignacio Sánchez Mejías. After the construction of the Estadio de la Exposición, the former name of Betis' current home, in 1929, Real Betis moved into the site officially in 1936, after playing a number of games at the stadium since its construction.
