= José Luis Torregrosa =

Spanish singer

José Luis Torregrosa (December 4, 1944 in Talavera de la Reina, Toledo – November 5, 2007 in Málaga) was a Spanish singer, musician, composer, and record producer. He worked with numerous artists including Julio Iglesias, Salvatore Adamo, Nino Bravo, and Massiel. His career was terminated in 1996 after suffering from cancer of the larynx; he later died from lung cancer.

== Biography ==
=== Early years ===
Torregrosa was born in Talavera de la Reina, Toledo. He got married very young and came to live in Torremolinos, Malaga. There he began to work in music, combining it with other jobs that came to him and left him more money at that time. Some venues hired him some nights as a singer, he stood out a lot for his powerful voice, which was compared in many cases with a multitude of artists. Torregrosa began to shine at night in Torremolinos and people admired him, and listened with pleasure to Torregrosa's talent. The singer began to become an emblematic sign of Torremolinos in the 60s. He dominated many styles, people danced with him from a ballad to a salsa.

=== Musical career ===
In 1968, Torregrosa signed a contract with the "Mi Bohío" nightclub, Torregrosa sang there where they offered him a good salary, and then Torregrosa began to live from music. The singer was one of the attractions of the room, that he packed whenever he sang, people enjoyed his great voice and his music. During those years he began to compose some of his own songs, among which stood out: Tu Bella Timidez, Oh Min Alskling, Remember My Love and Nothing New. Torregrosa made vinyl records of two or three of his own songs. In 1971, in Mi Bohío they were listening to Torregrosa, artists like Julio Iglesias and Salvatore Adamo.

In 1972, the cyclist Federico Martín Bahamontes also visited Torregrosa. The singer enjoyed singing in Mi Bohío where he spent great moments of his musical career, between the end of the 70s and the beginning of the 80s, Torregrosa recorded an album, Recuerdos, a compilation album in vinyl format that includes all the songs he had recorded. and some versions of classics like, My Way. On the album he obtained the collaboration of the three women that Massiel had as choirs in the 1968 Eurovision Song Contest. In 1980, Torregrosa left Mi Bohío and began working at "Apartamentos Bajondillo" where he also

=== Last Years and Throat Cancer ===
In the 90s, Torregrosa was still working at Apartamentos Bajondillo and his musical career did not give any kind of ups and downs. In 1996, doctors detected cancer of the larynx, Torregrosa was forced to temporarily withdraw from music while he battled his illness. In the summer of 1996, he underwent an operation and the cancer was removed and he began a long recovery, but once he recovered he would have a chronic hoarseness that would accompany him until the end of his days, Torregrosa would then lose his powerful voice. Torregrosa could never sing again. Indeed, when he recovered, he was hoarse and lost his voice.

=== Death ===
Coping with his illness, in 2007, he was diagnosed with lung cancer, the cancer was in a very advanced stage of metastasis. On the morning of November 5, 2007, Torregrosa died at the Virgen de la Victoria Hospital. The next day, his body was cremated and buried in the Malaga Cemetery Park.
