= 1930 Copa del Rey =

1930 King Alfonso XIII's Cup
30th Copa del Rey

Tournament details
- Country: Spain
- Teams: 31

Final positions
- Champions: Athletic Bilbao (10th title)
- Runners-up: Real Madrid

Tournament statistics
- Matches played: 63
- Goals scored: 245 (3.89 per match)

The King Alfonso XIII's Cup 1930 was the 30th staging of the Copa del Rey, the Spanish football cup competition.

The competition started on 6 April 1930 and concluded on 1 June 1930, with the final, held at the Montjuïch Stadium in Barcelona. Athletic Bilbao won their tenth title.

== Teams ==
- Andalusia Region: Sevilla FC, Real Betis
- Aragón Region: Iberia SC, Patria Aragón
- Asturias Region: Real Oviedo, Sporting de Gijón
- Balearic Islands Region: CD Alfonso XIII
- Canary Islands Region: Real Club Victoria
- Cantabria Region: Racing de Santander, Gimnástica de Torrelavega
- Castile and León Region: Cultural y Deportiva Leonesa, Real Valladolid
- Catalonia Region: FC Barcelona, CD Europa, RCD Español
- Extremadura Region: Don Benito
- Galicia Region: Celta de Vigo, Racing de Ferrol
- Gipuzkoa Region: Real Unión, Real Sociedad, CA Osasuna
- Murcia Region: Real Murcia, Cartagena FC
- Centre Region: Real Madrid, Racing de Madrid, Athletic Madrid
- Levante Region: Valencia CF, CD Castellón
- Biscay Region: Athletic Bilbao, CD Alavés, Arenas Club de Getxo

== Round of 32 ==
The first leg was played on 6 April. The second leg was played on 13 April.

Team 1	Agg.	Team 2	1st leg	2nd leg
Racing de Santander	4–5	Athletic Bilbao	3–0	1–5
Real Sociedad	4–0	Gimnástica de Torrelavega	2–0	2–0
Racing de Madrid	1–7	Real Unión	0–3	1–4
CD Castellón	2–2	Athletic Madrid	1–0	1–2
FC Barcelona	11–1	Deportivo La Coruña	8–0	3–1
CD Alavés	5–4	Sporting de Gijon	5–1	0–3
CA Osasuna	6–1	Iberia SC	3–0	3–1
CD Alfonso XIII	2–13	RCD Español	1–7	1–6
Real Valladolid	2–6	Real Club Victoria	1–1	1–5
Real Oviedo	4–2	CD Europa	4–0	0–2
Real Murcia	15–0	Don Benito	10–0	5–0
CD Patria Aragón	2–2	Real Madrid	1–1	1–1
Arenas de Guecho	8–1	Cartagena FC	6–1	2–0
Sevilla FC	2–2	Cultural Leonesa	1–0	1–2
Celta Vigo	2–5	Valencia CF	2–0	0–5

Real Betis received a bye.

- Tiebreaker

Team 1	Score	Team 2
CD Castellón	7–1	Athletic Madrid
Sevilla FC	2–1	Cultural Leonesa
Real Madrid	6–1	CD Patria Aragón

== Round of 16 ==
The first leg was played on 20 April. The second leg was played on 27 April.

Team 1	Agg.	Team 2	1st leg	2nd leg
Athletic Bilbao	5–2	Real Sociedad	4–1	1–1
Real Unión	2–1	CD Castellón	0–1	2–0
Real Betis	1–3	FC Barcelona	1–1	0–2
CD Alavés	4–1	CA Osasuna	3–1	1–0
RCD Español	8–2	Real Club Victoria	5–1	3–1
Real Murcia	4–6	Real Oviedo	2–1	2–5
Real Madrid	4-0	Arenas de Guecho	2-0	2–0
Valencia CF	7–4	Sevilla FC	5–1	2–3

== Quarter-finals ==
The first leg was played on 4 May. The second leg was played on 11 May.

Team 1	Agg.	Team 2	1st leg	2nd leg
RCD Español	3–0	Real Oviedo	2–0	1–0
CD Alavés	3–5	FC Barcelona	2–1	1–4
Real Unión	3–7	Athletic Bilbao	3–3	0–4
Valencia CF	4–5	Real Madrid	2–5	2–0

== Semi-finals ==
The first leg was played on 18 May. The second leg was played on 25 May.

Team 1	Agg.	Team 2	1st leg	2nd leg
Athletic Bilbao	5–5	FC Barcelona	2–1	3–4
RCD Español	1–2	Real Madrid	1–0	0–2

- Tiebreaker

Played on 27 May in Zaragoza.

Team 1	Score	Team 2
Athletic Bilbao	4–0	FC Barcelona

== Final ==
1 June 1930
16:30 CET

Athletic Bilbao	3–2 (a.e.t.)	Real Madrid
Unamuno 1'; Iraragorri 45'; Lafuente 115'		15' Lazcano; 65' Triana

Montjuïch, Barcelona
Attendance: 63,000
Referee: Guillermo Comorera

Copa del Rey 1930 winners
Athletic Bilbao
10th title
