= 1931–32 La Liga =

4th season of La Liga

Primera División
- Season: 1931–32
- Champions: Madrid FC (1st title)
- Relegated: Union Club
- Matches: 90
- Goals: 351 (3.9 per match)
- Top goalscorer: Guillermo Gorostiza (12)
- Biggest home win: Donostia 7–0 Arenas
- Biggest away win: Union Club 1–5 Athletic Bilbao
- Highest scoring: Valencia 6–4 Racing Santander
- Longest winning run: 5 matches Madrid FC
- Longest unbeaten run: 18 matches Madrid FC
- Longest winless run: 6 matches Alavés; Racing Santander; Valencia
- Longest losing run: 5 matches Alavés

1931–32 La Liga season started 22 November 1931, and finished 3 April 1932. As the Spanish Second Republic was established preceding the season, all the applicable clubs dropped the Royal patronage from their names and remove the crowns from their crests.

Athletic Bilbao was the defending champion. Madrid FC won its first title after finishing the season unbeaten. Valencia took part for the first time.

== Team information ==
Location of teams in 1931–32 La Liga

Club	City	Stadium
Alavés	Vitoria-Gasteiz	Mendizorroza
Arenas	Getxo	Ibaiondo
Athletic Bilbao	Bilbao	San Mamés
Barcelona	Barcelona	Les Corts
Donostia	San Sebastián	Atocha
Español	Barcelona	Sarriá
Madrid FC	Madrid	Chamartín
Racing Santander	Santander	El Sardinero
Unión Club	Irun	Gal
Valencia	Valencia	Mestalla

== League table ==
Pos	Team	Pld	W	D	L	GF	GA	GD	Pts	Relegation
1	Madrid FC (C)	18	10	8	0	37	15	+22	28	
2	Athletic Bilbao	18	11	3	4	47	23	+24	25	
3	FC Barcelona	18	10	4	4	40	26	+14	24	
4	Racing Santander	18	7	6	5	36	35	+1	20	
5	Arenas	18	7	3	8	35	42	−7	17	
6	Español	18	7	1	10	34	39	−5	15 (Note: Español finished ahead of Valencia on head-to-head goal difference: Valencia–Español 3–1, Español–Valencia 3–0.)	
7	Valencia	18	6	3	9	38	47	−9	15	
8	Donostia	18	7	0	11	38	35	+3	14	
9	Alavés	18	5	1	12	22	44	−22	11 (Note: Alavés finished ahead of Unión Club on head-to-head points: Alavés–Unión Club 1–0, Unión Club–Alavés 0–2.)	
10	Unión Club (R)	18	4	3	11	24	45	−21	11	Relegation to the Segunda División

Rules for classification: 1) points; 2) head-to-head points; 3) head-to-head goal difference; 4) goal difference; 5) number of goals scored.
(C) Champions; (R) Relegated

== Results ==
Home \ Away	ALA	ARE	ATH	BAR	DON	ESP	MAD	RAC	UNI	VAL
Alavés	—	3–1	0–1	1–3	1–2	4–1	0–1	1–2	1–0	2–1
Arenas	4–2	—	2–1	1–3	2–1	3–2	2–2	3–1	5–0	4–1
Athletic Bilbao	3–2	4–1	—	3–0	5–1	4–0	3–3	3–2	2–1	7–2
Barcelona	6–0	2–2	1–3	—	2–0	2–2	2–2	4–2	3–2	3–2
Donostia	4–1	7–0	3–2	0–1	—	5–2	1–2	1–5	5–0	7–1
Español	4–0	4–2	1–0	0–3	2–0	—	1–2	6–1	3–1	3–0
Madrid FC	5–0	4–0	1–1	2–0	1–0	3–0	—	0–0	3–2	4–1
Racing Santander	1–1	1–1	2–0	3–2	2–1	2–1	0–0	—	2–2	4–1
Unión Club	0–2	1–0	1–5	1–3	2–0	4–1	1–1	2–2	—	3–2
Valencia	5–1	3–2	0–0	0–0	4–0	3–1	1–1	6–4	5–1	—

Source: BDFútbol.com
Legend: Blue = home team win; Yellow = draw; Red = away team win.

== Top scorers ==
Rank	Goalscorers	Goal	Team
1	(Spain) Bata	15	Athletic Bilbao
2	(Spain) Josep Samitier	11	Barcelona
2	(Spain) Cholín	11	Donostia
2	(Spain) Manuel Olivares	11	Madrid FC
5	(Spain) Edelmiro Lorenzo	10	Español
5	(Spain) Julio Antonio Elícegui	10	Real Unión
5	(Spain) Cisco	10	Racing Santander
8	(Spain) Guillermo Gorostiza	9	Athletic Bilbao
8	(Spain) José Iraragorri	9	Athletic Bilbao
8	(Spain) Capillas	9	Valencia

=== Pichichi Trophy ===
Note: This list is the alternative top scorers list provided by newspaper Diario Marca, it differs from the one above which is based on official match reports

Goalscorers	Goal	Team
(Spain) Guillermo Gorostiza	12	Athletic Bilbao
(Spain) Bata	11	Athletic Bilbao
(Spain) Cholín	10	Donostia
(Spain) Cisco	10	Racing de Santander
