= Manuel Gurruchaga Lavín =

Spanish footballer

Personal information
- Full name: Manuel Gurruchaga Lavín
- Date of birth: 8 May 1908
- Place of birth: Ortuella, Spain
- Date of death: 24 October 1975 (aged 67)
- Position: Midfielder

Manuel Gurruchaga Lavín was a Spanish football midfielder who played for Real Madrid.

== Honours ==
Real Madrid

- La Liga: 1932–33
- Copa del Rey: 1934
