= Evaristo San Miguel (footballer) =

Spanish footballer (1909–1990)

Personal information
- Full name: Evaristo San Miguel Cobián
- Date of birth: 13 July 1909
- Place of birth: Infiesto, Asturias, Spain
- Date of death: 4 November 1990 (aged 81)
- Place of death: Spain
- Position: Forward

Senior career*
Years	Team	Apps	(Gls)
1925–1928	Real Unión Deportiva		
1928–1929	Real Valladolid		
1929–1930	Real Madrid	12	(1)
1931–1932	Castilla		
1932–1933	Real Valladolid		
1933–1934	Racing de Santander	5	(3)
Total		17	(4)
- * Club domestic league appearances and goals

Evaristo San Miguel Cobián (13 July 1909 – 4 November 1990) was a Spanish footballer who played as a forward for Real Madrid and Racing de Santander in the early 1930s.

== Playing career ==
Born on 13 July 1909 in the Asturias town of Infiesto, Evaristo and his brother Pedro began their football career at hometown club Real Unión Deportiva in the mid-1920s, where they played until it merged with Club Deportivo Español to form Real Valladolid in September 1928.

Despite lacking shooting power, he made up for it with his exquisite technique, which caught the attention of the top-flight team Real Madrid, making his official debut for the club in a La Liga match against Athletic Bilbao on 1 December 1929 at the San Mamés, which ended in a 1–2 loss, and scoring his first goal for the club in the following month, on 5 January 1930, in a 6–0 trashing of his future club Racing de Santander. In his first (and only) season at the club, he stayed for only season, scoring a total of 2 goals in 16 official matches, including 1 goal in 12 La Liga matches, and 1 goal in 4 regional championship matches, which Madrid won.

After leaving Madrid, San Miguel played one season each at Castilla (1931–32) and Real Valladolid (1932–33) before returning to the top-flight with Racing de Santander, where he retired in 1934, aged 25. In total, he scored 4 goals in 17 La Liga matches for Madrid and Santander.

== Death ==
San Miguel died on 4 November 1990, at the age of 81.

== Honours ==
Real Madrid

- Campeonato Regional Centro:
  - Champions (1): 1929–30
