= Luis Usera Bugallal =

Spanish lawyer, businessman, and football executive

7th president of Real Madrid
- In office 1930 – 31 May 1935
- Preceded by: Luis de Urquijo
- Succeeded by: Rafael Sánchez Guerra

Personal details
- Born: 8 July 1890; Talavera de la Reina, Kingdom of Spain
- Died: 7 August 1958 (aged 68); Madrid, Spanish State
- Occupation: Lawyer, businessman

Luis Usera Bugallal (8 July 1890 – 7 August 1958) was a Spanish lawyer and businessman who was the 7th president of Real Madrid from 1930 until 31 May 1935.

== Honours ==
- La Liga: 1931–32, 1932–33
- Copa del Presidente de la República: 1934
