= Fernando Sañudo =

Spanish footballer (1912–1980)

Personal information
- Full name: Ildefonso Fernando Sañudo García
- Date of birth: 23 January 1912
- Place of birth: Torrelavega, Spain
- Date of death: 29 January 1980 (aged 68)
- Place of death: Santa Cruz de Tenerife, Spain
- Height: 1.77 m (5 ft 9 1/2 in)
- Position: Forward

Senior career*
Years	Team	Apps	(Gls)
1931–1932	Alavés	9	(22)
1931–1932	Valladolid	32	(39)
1934–1936	Real Madrid	38	(40)
1938–1939	Aviación Nacional		
1939–1940	Torrelavega	11	(9)
1940–1941	Barreda		
1941–1943	Valladolid	59	(22)
1943–1944	Torrelavega	1	(2)
- * Club domestic league appearances and goals

Ildefonso Fernando Sañudo García (23 January 1912, Torrelavega — 29 January 1980) was a former Spanish footballer who played as a forward. He played for Real Madrid between 1934 and 1936.

== Professional career ==
Sañudo played football as a child in his hometown Torrelavega, and formed a team Deportivo La Paz to play in local tournaments in his area. Studying to be a lawyer, Sañudo was prolific in high school and college tournaments which prompted him to sign with Alavés in 1931. After his stint with Alavés, he moved to Valladolid to finish his last years of study in law, and was then signed by Valladolid where he helped them achieve promotion to the Segunda División.

Sañudo returned to Torrelavega in 1934 after he finished his studies, and was approached to join Real Madrid. He signed professionally, and was a mainstay at the team helping them win the 1936 Copa del Presidente de la República. He participated in the biggest Real Madrid win over their rivals FC Barcelona, an 8–2 victory in 1935 where he scored 4 goals. When the Spanish Civil War broke out, he was called to military service and played for the military sponsored-side Aviación Nacional.

Real Madrid and Atlético Madrid tried to sign him after the war broke out, but he returned to Torrelavega to tend to his family business and played amateurly for Torrelavega. While maintaining his business, he then transferred to Barreda, and then Valladolid, before retiring his footballing career at Torrelavega to pay his full attention to the family business.

== Honours ==
Real Valladolid

- Tercera División: 1933–34

Real Madrid

- Copa del Rey: 1936
