= José Ramón Sauto =

Mexican footballer (1912-1994)

Personal information
- Full name: José Ramón Sauto Hurtado
- Date of birth: 7 September 1912
- Place of birth: Mexico City, Mexico
- Date of death: 16 April 1994 (aged 81)
- Place of death: Madrid, Spain
- Position: Midfielder

Senior career*
Years	Team	Apps	(Gls)
1933–1944	Real Madrid	97	(0)
- * Club domestic league appearances and goals

José Ramón Sauto Hurtado (7 September 1912 – 16 April 1994) was a Mexican footballer who played the position of midfielder for Real Madrid in the 1930s and 1940s. He was the first Mexican born player to play for Real Madrid although he always played as Spaniard; his career spanned the Spanish Civil War.

== Career ==
He made his debut for Real Madrid on 17 December 1933, in Real Madrid's 0–1 defeat versus Real Betis. He played for Real for six seasons, in 137 matches. He was a two time captain for the merengues.

== Statistics at Real Madrid ==
Club	Season	League		Domestic Cup		Inter. Cup		Total	
Club	Season	Matches	Goals	Matches	Goals	Matches	Goals	Matches	Goals
Real Madrid; Spain	1933–34, 1935–36, 1939–1944	97	0	27	0	18	-	142	0

Sporting positions
Preceded by Quincoces	Real Madrid C.F. captain 1942–1944	Succeeded by Ipiña
