= 1932–33 La Liga =

5th season of La Liga

Primera División
- Season: 1932–33
- Champions: Madrid FC (2nd title)
- Relegated: Alavés
- Matches: 90
- Goals: 400 (4.44 per match)
- Top goalscorer: Manuel Olivares (16 goals)
- Biggest home win: Racing Santander 9–0 Alavés
- Biggest away win: Betis 1–5 Athletic Bilbao; Valencia 1–5 Athletic Bilbao
- Highest scoring: Athletic Bilbao 9–5 Racing Santander
- Longest winning run: 6 matches Madrid FC
- Longest unbeaten run: 14 matches Madrid FC
- Longest winless run: 9 matches Betis
- Longest losing run: 6 matches Alavés

The 1932–33 La Liga season began on 27 November 1932 and finished on 28 March 1933. Holders Madrid FC retained their title.

Betis became the first club from Andalusia to compete in La Liga during this season.

== Team information ==
Location of teams in 1932–33 La Liga

Club	City	Stadium
Alavés	Vitoria-Gasteiz	Mendizorroza
Arenas	Getxo	Ibaiondo
Athletic Bilbao	Bilbao	San Mamés
Barcelona	Barcelona	Les Corts
Betis	Seville	Patronato Obrero
Donostia	San Sebastián	Atocha
Español	Barcelona	Sarriá
Madrid FC	Madrid	Chamartín
Racing Santander	Santander	El Sardinero
Valencia	Valencia	Mestalla

== League table ==
Pos	Team	Pld	W	D	L	GF	GA	GD	Pts	Relegation
1	Madrid FC (C)	18	13	2	3	49	17	+32	28	
2	Athletic Bilbao	18	13	0	5	63	30	+33	26	
3	Español	18	10	2	6	33	30	+3	22	
4	Barcelona	18	7	5	6	42	34	+8	19	
5	Betis	18	6	5	7	31	45	−14	17	
6	Donostia	18	6	3	9	41	47	−6	15	
7	Arenas	18	5	4	9	39	44	−5	14 (Note: Arenas finished ahead of Racing Santander on overall goal difference.)	
8	Racing Santander	18	6	2	10	47	58	−11	14	
9	Valencia	18	4	5	9	34	53	−19	13	
10	Alavés (R)	18	5	2	11	21	42	−21	12	Relegation to the Segunda División

Source: BDFútbol
Rules for classification: 1) points; 2) head-to-head points; 3) head-to-head goal difference; 4) goal difference; 5) number of goals scored.
(C) Champions; (R) Relegated

== Results ==
Home \ Away	ALA	ARE	ATH	BAR	BET	DON	ESP	MAD	RAC	VAL
Alavés	—	1–1	0–2	2–1	2–0	1–0	1–0	0–1	8–2	1–1
Arenas	3–0	—	4–2	5–1	3–3	6–0	0–2	1–5	2–1	2–2
Athletic Bilbao	4–0	3–1	—	1–3	9–1	1–2	0–2	0–2	9–5	8–2
Barcelona	2–0	5–2	2–3	—	4–1	3–2	1–1	1–1	4–0	4–2
Betis	3–1	1–1	1–5	2–1	—	4–2	1–2	0–0	3–2	3–2
Donostia	3–1	2–1	2–4	2–2	2–2	—	6–1	1–2	8–0	4–1
Español	3–1	3–2	2–5	2–1	1–2	3–0	—	2–1	2–1	5–2
Madrid FC	2–0	8–2	0–1	2–1	4–1	6–2	2–0	—	4–1	6–0
Racing Santander	9–0	2–1	0–1	4–4	2–2	7–1	3–1	4–2	—	2–0
Valencia	5–2	3–2	1–5	2–2	2–1	2–2	1–1	0–1	6–2	—

Source: BDFútbol.com
Legend: Blue = home team win; Yellow = draw; Red = away team win.

== Pichichi Trophy and La liga top scorers ==
Note: this season there are no differences between La liga top scorers and the Pichichi Trophy winners.

Rank	Goalscorers	Team	Goals
1	(Spain) Manuel Olivares	Madrid FC	16
2	(Spain) Bata	Athletic Bilbao	15
3	(Spain) José Iraragorri	Athletic Bilbao	14
3	(Spain) Guillermo Gorostiza	Athletic Bilbao	14
5	(Spain) Francisco Iriondo	Arenas	13
5	(Spain) Luis Regueiro	Madrid FC	13
7	(Spain) Juan Ramón	Barcelona	12
7	(Spain) Santiago Urtizberea	Donostia	12
9	(Spain) Victorio Unamuno	Athletic Bilbao	11
9	(Spain) Ángel Arocha	Barcelona	11
