= List of Real Madrid CF managers =

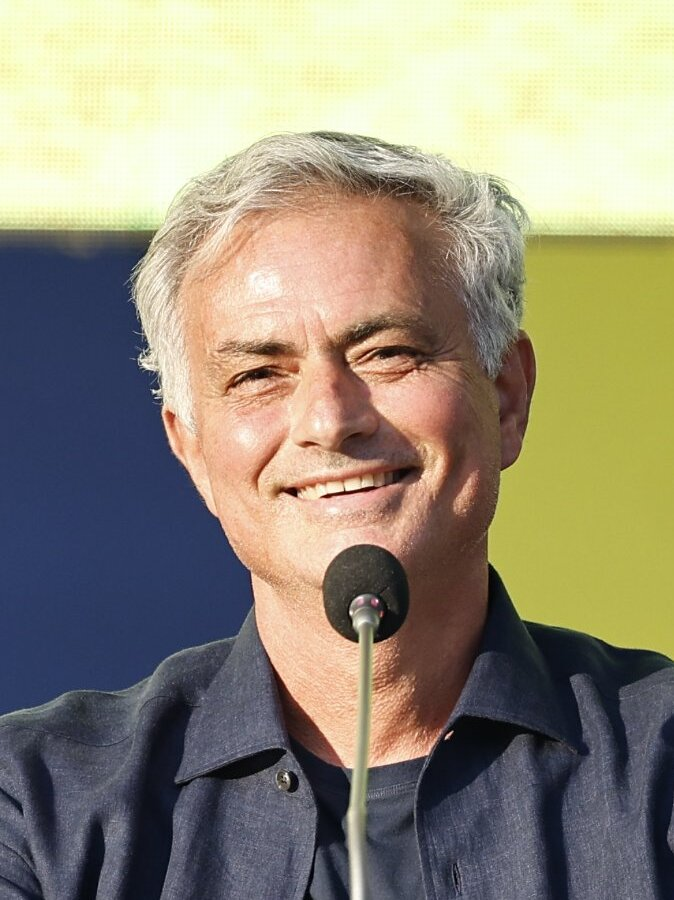
José Mourinho is the current head coach of Real Madrid

Real Madrid Club de Fútbol is a professional football club based in Madrid, Spain, which plays in La Liga. This chronological list comprises all those who have held the position of manager of the first team of Real Madrid from 1910, when the first professional manager was appointed, to the present day. Each manager's entry includes his dates of tenure and the club's overall competitive record (in terms of matches won, drawn and lost), major honours won and significant achievements under his leadership. Caretaker managers are included, where known. As of the end of the 2024–25 season, Real Madrid have had 50 full-time managers.

The first full-time manager for Real Madrid was Arthur Johnson. He was signed by one of the founders of Real Madrid, and then director, Adolfo Meléndez, and coached the team for ten seasons, gaining one Spanish Cup.

The most successful coach with Real Madrid is Carlo Ancelotti, as he has won 15 titles with the team. Ancelotti, in two spells, won La Liga twice, Copa del Rey twice, UEFA Champions League three times, Spanish Super Cup twice, UEFA Super Cup three times, FIFA Club World Cup twice, and one FIFA Intercontinental Cup.

== List of managers ==
The complete list of Real Madrid managers is shown in the following table:

Information correct as of the match played 9 November 2026. Only competitive matches are counted.

Manager	Nat.	From	To	G^{[A]}	W	D	L	GF	GA	Win%^{[B]}	Honours	Notes
Arthur Johnson	(Ireland)	1910	1920	23	11	3	9	48	39	47.83	1 Copa del Rey	^{[C]}^{[D]}
Juan de Cárcer	(Spain)	1920	1926	22	10	2	10	38	45	45.45		^{[C]}
Pedro Llorente	(Spain)	1926	1927	8	5	0	3	31	15	62.50		^{[C]}^{[E]}
Santiago Bernabéu	(Spain)	1926	1927	8	5	0	3	31	15	62.50		^{[C]}^{[E]}
José Berraondo	(Spain)	1927	1929	41	27	4	10	115	58	65.85		^{[C]}
José Quirante	(Spain)	1929	1930	18	7	3	8	45	42	38.89		^{[C]}
Lippo Hertzka	(Hungary)	1930	1932	52	26	15	11	95	58	50.00	1 La Liga	
Robert Firth	(England)	1932	1934	45	30	5	10	126	52	66.67	1 La Liga	
Francisco Bru	(Spain)	1934	1941	118	71	13	34	290	152	60.17	2 Copa del Rey	
Juan Armet	(Spain)	1941	September 1943	46	23	7	16	96	72	50.00		
Ramón Encinas	(Spain)	September 1943	May 1945	84	45	15	24	199	126	53.57		
Jacinto Quincoces	(Spain)	May 1945	March 1946	35	18	10	7	70	37	51.43	1 Copa del Rey	^{[C]}
Baltasar Albéniz	(Spain)	March 1946	April 1947	35	18	5	12	82	66	51.43	1 Copa del Rey	
Jacinto Quincoces	(Spain)	April 1947	January 1948	17	5	4	8	32	41	29.41		
Michael Keeping	(England)	January 1948	October 1950	82	37	20	25	192	153	45.12	1 Copa Eva Duarte	
Baltasar Albéniz	(Spain)	October 1950	March 1951	16	7	2	7	41	37	43.75		
Héctor Scarone	(Uruguay)	March 1951	April 1952	48	25	10	13	113	73	52.08		
Juan Antonio Ipiña	(Spain)	April 1952	May 1953	34	21	2	11	82	57	61.76		^{[C]}
Enrique Fernández	(Uruguay)	May 1953	10 December 1954	50	31	8	11	126	60	62.00	1 La Liga	
José Villalonga	(Spain)	10 December 1954	June 1957	105	66	14	25	269	141	62.86	2 La Liga; 2 UEFA Champions League	^{[F]}
Luis Carniglia	(Argentina)	June 1957	19 February 1959	68	48	11	9	178	58	70.59	1 La Liga; 1 UEFA Champions League	
Miguel Muñoz	(Spain)	21 February 1959	13 April 1959	9	5	2	2	31	9	55.56		^{[C]}^{[G]}
Luis Carniglia	(Argentina)	13 April 1959	July 1959	13	8	1	4	28	16	61.54	1 UEFA Champions League	
Manuel Fleitas	(Paraguay)	July 1959	12 April 1960	33	23	4	6	109	42	69.70		
Miguel Muñoz	(Spain)	13 April 1960	15 January 1974	595	352	126	117	1,194	553	59.16	9 La Liga; 2 Copa del Rey; 2 UEFA Champions League; 1 Intercontinental Cup	^{[G]}
Luis Molowny	(Spain)	15 January 1974	May 1974	23	13	2	8	49	26	56.52	1 Copa del Rey	^{[C]}
Miljan Miljanić	(Socialist Federal Republic of Yugoslavia)	May 1974	7 September 1977	134	67	36	31	231	150	50.00	2 La Liga; 1 Copa del Rey	
Luis Molowny	(Spain)	7 September 1977	June 1979	90	51	24	15	196	94	56.67	2 La Liga	
Vujadin Boškov	(Socialist Federal Republic of Yugoslavia)	June 1979	29 March 1982	139	80	31	28	249	136	57.55	1 La Liga; 1 Copa del Rey	
Luis Molowny	(Spain)	29 March 1982	30 June 1982	6	4	1	1	11	7	66.67	1 Copa del Rey	
Alfredo Di Stéfano	(Argentina)	1 July 1982	22 May 1984	108	63	23	22	192	113	58.33		^{[C]}
Amancio Amaro	(Spain)	22 May 1984	16 April 1985	47	19	13	15	69	52	40.43		^{[C]}
Luis Molowny	(Spain)	16 April 1985	30 June 1986	61	39	7	15	137	67	63.93	1 La Liga; 1 Copa de la Liga; 2 UEFA Europa League	
Leo Beenhakker	(Netherlands)	1 July 1986	30 June 1989	169	107	40	22	357	158	63.31	3 La Liga; 1 Copa del Rey; 2 Supercopa de España	
John Toshack	(Wales)	1 July 1989	19 November 1990	64	41	15	8	161	56	64.06	1 La Liga	
Alfredo Di Stéfano	(Argentina)	21 November 1990	22 March 1991	21	9	3	9	32	22	42.86	1 Supercopa de España	
Radomir Antić	(Socialist Federal Republic of Yugoslavia)	22 March 1991	27 January 1992	39	27	6	6	84	32	69.23		
Leo Beenhakker	(Netherlands)	27 January 1992	29 June 1992	28	14	7	7	47	27	50.00		
Benito Floro	(Spain)	1 July 1992	7 March 1994	92	52	21	19	165	90	56.52	1 Copa del Rey; 1 Supercopa de España	
Vicente del Bosque	(Spain)	7 March 1994	30 June 1994	12	5	2	5	24	23	41.67		^{[C]}
Jorge Valdano	(Argentina)	1 July 1994	21 January 1996	78	39	17	22	142	87	50.00	1 La Liga	^{[C]}
Vicente del Bosque	(Spain)	21 January 1996	24 January 1996	1	1	0	0	5	0	100.00		
Arsenio Iglesias	(Spain)	24 January 1996	29 May 1996	21	11	4	6	33	22	52.38		
Fabio Capello	(Italy)	1 July 1996	24 June 1997	48	31	12	5	96	41	64.58	1 La Liga	
Jupp Heynckes	(Germany)	25 June 1997	28 May 1998	53	26	15	12	92	55	49.06	1 Supercopa de España; 1 UEFA Champions League	
José Antonio Camacho	(Spain)	17 June 1998	9 July 1998	0	0	0	0	0	0	—		^{[C]}
Guus Hiddink	(Netherlands)	15 July 1998	23 February 1999	34	19	4	11	73	48	55.88	1 Intercontinental Cup	
John Toshack	(Wales)	24 February 1999	17 November 1999	37	19	9	9	73	62	51.35		
Vicente del Bosque	(Spain)	17 November 1999	23 June 2003	233	127	56	50	461	267	54.51	2 La Liga; 1 Supercopa de España; 2 UEFA Champions League; 1 UEFA Super Cup; 1 Intercontinental Cup	
Carlos Queiroz	(Portugal)	25 June 2003	24 May 2004	59	34	11	14	113	76	57.63	1 Supercopa de España	
José Antonio Camacho	(Spain)	25 May 2004	20 September 2004	6	4	0	2	7	5	66.67		
Mariano García Remón	(Spain)	20 September 2004	30 December 2004	20	12	4	4	37	18	60.00^{[H]}		^{[C]}
Vanderlei Luxemburgo	(Brazil)	30 December 2004	4 December 2005	45	28	7	10	83	45	62.22^{[H]}		
Juan Ramón López Caro	(Spain)	4 December 2005	1 June 2006	24	12	9	3	41	25	50.00		
Fabio Capello	(Italy)	5 July 2006	28 June 2007	50	28	12	10	91	55	56.00	1 La Liga	
Bernd Schuster	(Germany)	9 July 2007	9 December 2008	75	44	9	22	156	100	58.67	1 La Liga; 1 Supercopa de España	^{[C]}
Juande Ramos	(Spain)	9 December 2008	1 June 2009	27	18	1	8	53	34	66.67		
Manuel Pellegrini	(Chile)	2 June 2009	26 May 2010	48	36	5	7	119	48	75.00		
José Mourinho	(Portugal)	31 May 2010	1 June 2013	178	128	28	22	475	168	71.91	1 La Liga; 1 Copa del Rey; 1 Supercopa de España	^{[FIFA]}
Carlo Ancelotti	(Italy)	25 June 2013	25 May 2015	119	89	14	16	323	103	74.79	1 Copa del Rey; 1 UEFA Champions League; 1 UEFA Super Cup; 1 FIFA Club World Cup	^{[I]}
Rafael Benítez	(Spain)	3 June 2015	4 January 2016	25	17	5	3	69	22	68.00		
Zinedine Zidane	(France)	4 January 2016	31 May 2018	149	104	29	16	393	160	69.80	1 La Liga; 1 Supercopa de España; 3 UEFA Champions League; 2 UEFA Super Cup; 2 FIFA Club World Cup	^{[C]}^{[FIFA]}
Julen Lopetegui	(Spain)	12 June 2018	29 October 2018	14	6	2	6	21	20	42.86		^{[C]}
Santiago Solari	(Argentina)	30 October 2018	11 March 2019	32	22	2	8	71	37	68.75	1 FIFA Club World Cup	^{[C]}
Zinedine Zidane	(France)	11 March 2019	27 May 2021	114	69	25	20	207	104	60.53	1 La Liga; 1 Supercopa de España	^{[C]}
Carlo Ancelotti	(Italy)	1 June 2021	31 May 2025	234	161	36	37	512	238	68.80	2 La Liga; 1 Copa del Rey; 2 Supercopa de España; 2 UEFA Champions League; 2 UEFA Super Cup; 1 FIFA Club World Cup; 1 FIFA Intercontinental Cup	^{[I]}^{[FIFA]}
Xabi Alonso	(Spain)	1 June 2025	12 January 2026	34	24	4	6	72	38	70.59		^{[C]}
Álvaro Arbeloa	(Spain)	12 January 2026	9 June 2026	28	18	2	8	58	34	64.29		^{[C]}
José Mourinho	(Portugal)	11 June 2026	Present	16	14	0	2	44	17	87.50		
Manager	Nat.	From	To	G^{[A]}	W	D	L	GF	GA	Win%^{[B]}	Honours	Notes

== Trophies ==
Rank	Manager	LL	CdR	SdE	CED	CdlL	UCL	UEL	USC	LC	IC	CI	FCWC	FIC	Total
1	(Italy) Carlo Ancelotti	2	2	2	–	–	3	–	3	–	–	–	2	1	15
2	(Spain) Miguel Muñoz	9	2	–	–	–	2	–	–	–	1	–	–	–	14
3	(France) Zinedine Zidane	2	–	2	–	–	3	–	2	–	–	–	2	–	11
4	(Spain) Luis Molowny	3	2	–	–	1	–	2	–	–	–	–	–	–	8
4	(Spain) Vicente del Bosque	2	–	1	–	–	2	–	1	–	1	1	–	–	8
6	(Netherlands) Leo Beenhakker	3	1	2	–	–	–	–	–	–	–	–	–	–	6
6	(Spain) José Villalonga	2	–	–	–	–	2	–	–	2	–	–	–	–	6
8	(Argentina) Luis Carniglia	1	–	–	–	–	2	–	–	–	–	–	–	–	3
8	(Socialist Federal Republic of Yugoslavia) Miljan Miljanić	2	1	–	–	–	–	–	–	–	–	–	–	–	3
8	(Portugal) José Mourinho	1	1	1	–	–	–	–	–	–	–	–	–	–	3
11	(Spain) Francisco Bru	–	2	–	–	–	–	–	–	–	–	–	–	–	2
11	(Socialist Federal Republic of Yugoslavia) Vujadin Boškov	1	1	–	–	–	–	–	–	–	–	–	–	–	2
11	(Spain) Benito Floro	–	1	1	–	–	–	–	–	–	–	–	–	–	2
11	(Italy) Fabio Capello	2	–	–	–	–	–	–	–	–	–	–	–	–	2
11	(Germany) Jupp Heynckes	–	–	1	–	–	1	–	–	–	–	–	–	–	2
11	(Germany) Bernd Schuster	1	–	1	–	–	–	–	–	–	–	–	–	–	2
17	(Ireland) Arthur Johnson	–	1	–	–	–	–	–	–	–	–	–	–	–	1
17	(Hungary) Lippo Hertzka	1	–	–	–	–	–	–	–	–	–	–	–	–	1
17	(England) Robert Firth	1	–	–	–	–	–	–	–	–	–	–	–	–	1
17	(Spain) Jacinto Quincoces	–	1	–	–	–	–	–	–	–	–	–	–	–	1
17	(Spain) Baltasar Albéniz	–	1	–	–	–	–	–	–	–	–	–	–	–	1
17	(England) Michael Keeping	–	–	–	1	–	–	–	–	–	–	–	–	–	1
17	(Uruguay) Enrique Fernández	1	–	–	–	–	–	–	–	–	–	–	–	–	1
17	(Wales) John Toshack	1	–	–	–	–	–	–	–	–	–	–	–	–	1
17	(Argentina) Alfredo Di Stéfano	–	–	1	–	–	–	–	–	–	–	–	–	–	1
17	(Argentina) Jorge Valdano	1	–	–	–	–	–	–	–	–	–	–	–	–	1
17	(Netherlands) Guus Hiddink	–	–	–	–	–	–	–	–	–	1	–	–	–	1
17	(Portugal) Carlos Queiroz	–	–	1	–	–	–	–	–	–	–	–	–	–	1
17	(Argentina) Santiago Solari	–	–	–	–	–	–	–	–	–	–	–	1	–	1

== Notes ==
- A. Campeonato Centro matches are not counted because it was a regional championship.
- B. Win % is rounded to two decimal places.
- C. ^{a} ^{b} ^{c} ^{d} ^{e} ^{f} ^{g} ^{h} ^{i} ^{j} ^{k} ^{l} ^{m} ^{n} ^{o} ^{p} ^{q} ^{r} ^{s} ^{t} ^{u} ^{v} Formerly played for the club.
- D. Arthur Johnson is the club's first full-time manager.
- E. ^{a} ^{b} Pedro Llorente and Santiago Bernabéu jointly managed the team from the dismissal of Juan de Cárcer until the appointment of José Ángel Berraondo, so they share the same statistics.
- F. José Villalonga is the first manager to manage a Spanish club side in European competition and to win a European trophy (1955–56 European Cup).
- G. ^{a} ^{b} Miguel Muñoz is the longest-serving manager in club history.
- H. ^{a} ^{b} Mariano García Remón and Vanderlei Luxemburgo share a victory against Real Sociedad in the La Liga. The match was suspended due to a bomb threat on 12 December 2004, with seven minutes remaining and the score at 1–1. It was resumed on 5 January 2005, and ended with a final score of 2–1.
- I. ^{a} ^{b} Carlo Ancelotti is the manager with most honours won in club history.
- FIFA. ^{a} ^{b} ^{c} Won FIFA World Coach of the Year/The Best FIFA Football Coach while at Real Madrid.
