= Hilario (footballer, born 1905) =

Spanish footballer (born 1905)

Personal information
- Full name: Juan Hilario Marrero Pérez
- Date of birth: 8 December 1905
- Place of birth: Las Palmas, Spain
- Date of death: 14 February 1989 (aged 83)
- Place of death: Las Palmas, Spain
- Position: Midfielder

Senior career*
Years	Team	Apps	(Gls)
1922–1925	Porteño		
1925–1928	Victoria		
1928–1931	Deportivo La Coruña	50	(28)
1931–1936	Real Madrid	73	(23)
1936	Valencia	0	(0)
1939–1940	Barcelona	6	(1)
1940–1942	Deportivo La Coruña	21	(4)
1942–1943	Elche		

International career
1931–1935	Spain	2	(1)

Managerial career
- 1940–1941: Deportivo La Coruña
- 1942–1943: Elche
- 1943–1944: Racing Ferrol
- 1944: Betanzos
- 1944–1945: Racing Ferrol
- 1945–1946: Deportivo La Coruña
- 1947–1949: Racing Ferrol
- 1949–1950: Gerona
- 1952–1953: UD Tenerife
- 1959: Deportivo La Coruña
- 1959–1960: Racing Ferrol
- * Club domestic league appearances and goals

Juan Hilario Marrero Pérez (8 December 1905 – 14 February 1989), known as Hilario, was a Spanish association footballer. He earned two caps and scored one goal for the Spain national team, and participated in the 1934 FIFA World Cup.
