= Manuel Olivares =

Spanish footballer and manager

Personal information
- Full name: Manuel Olivares Lapeña
- Date of birth: 2 April 1909
- Place of birth: Son Servera, Spain
- Date of death: 16 February 1976 (aged 66)
- Place of death: Madrid, Spain
- Position: Striker

Youth career
- Avión San Sebastián

Senior career*
Years	Team	Apps	(Gls)
1928–1931	Alavés	14	(10)
1931–1934	Real Madrid	39	(34)
1934–1935	Donostia	17	(7)
1935–1936	Zaragoza		
1939–1940	Zaragoza	5	(2)
1940–1941	Hércules	7	(3)
1941–1942	Málaga		
1942–1943	Algeciras		

International career
1930	Spain	1	(0)

Managerial career
- 1935–1936: Zaragoza (player-coach)
- 1939–1941: Hércules (player-coach)
- 1941–1943: Málaga (player-coach)
- 1943–1944: Linense
- 1944–1946: Salamanca
- 1946–1947: Zaragoza
- 1947–1948: Fábrica Nacional Palencia
- 1948–1949: Burgos
- 1949–1950: Villena
- 1950–1952: Calvo Sotelo
- 1952–1953: Betis
- 1953–1954: Orihuela Deportiva
- * Club domestic league appearances and goals

Manuel Olivares Lapeña (2 April 1909 – 16 February 1976) was a Spanish football striker and manager.

In only 82 La Liga games he scored 56 goals, mostly for Real Madrid with which he won three major titles.

== Club career ==
Born in Son Servera, Balearic Islands, Olivares joined Deportivo Alavés in 1928 and made his debut in La Liga in the 1930–31 season, scoring ten goals in 14 games as the Basques finished in eighth position (out of ten clubs). In the following off-season, he signed for country giants Real Madrid.

In his first two years with the Merengues, Olivares netted at an impressive rate, winning two consecutive national championships and the 1934 Copa del Presidente de la República. In the 1932–33 campaign, he scored 16 goals in only 14 matches to conquer the Pichichi Trophy.

Olivares spent a further three years in the top division, with Donostia CF, Real Zaragoza and Hércules CF. In 1935 he started his coaching career with the second club, going on to act as player-coach for several teams until 1943 and definitively retiring as a player with Algeciras CF in the regional leagues.

In 1944–45, Olivares led UD Salamanca to Segunda División, being relegated the following season. He died on 16 February 1976 in Madrid, at the age of 66.

== International career ==
Olivares played once for Spain, appearing in a 0–2 friendly loss in Czechoslovakia on 14 June 1930.

== Honours ==
=== Player ===
Real Madrid

- La Liga: 1931–32, 1932–33
- Copa del Presidente de la República: 1934
- Pichichi Trophy: 1932–33

=== Manager ===
Salamanca

- Tercera División: 1944–45
