= Estadio de Nervión =

Multi-use stadium in Seville, Spain

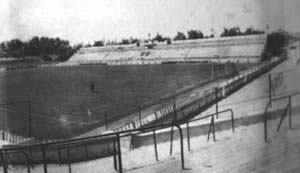
- Interactive map of Estadio de Nervión
- Full name: Estadio de Nervión
- Coordinates: 37.383608°N 5.971942°W
- Owner: Sevilla FC
- Capacity: 20,000

Construction
- Opened: 1928
- Closed: 1958

Tenant
- Sevilla FC (1928–1958)

Estadio de Nervión was a multi-use stadium in Seville, Spain. It was used mostly for football matches and hosted the home matches of Sevilla FC. The stadium was able to hold 20,000 people and opened in 1928. It was closed in 1958 when Estadio Ramón Sánchez Pizjuán opened.

Estadio de Nervión replaced Campo de la Reina Victoria.
