= Leoncito (footballer) =

Spanish footballer

Antonio León Amador, better known as Leoncito (30 August 1909 – 11 March 1995) was a Spanish professional association football player. He was born in Sevilla. Amador spent his career playing as a midfielder. The most significant part of his career was playing for Real MAdrid in 148 matches, in which he scored eight times.

== Clubs ==
| Club | Country | Period |
|---|---|---|
| CD Leonesa | Spain | 1928–1930 |
| Real Madrid CF | Spain | 1930–1936 |
| Sevilla FC | Spain | 1939–1940 |
| Real Madrid CF | Spain | 1940–1942 |
| Real Valladolid | Spain | 1942–1944 |

== International selection ==
He played in two matches for the Spain national football team in 1931.
