= Antonio Bonet (footballer) =

Spanish footballer and manager

Personal information
- Full name: Antonio Bonet Silvestre
- Date of birth: 14 August 1908
- Place of birth: Caudiel, Spain
- Date of death: March 1993 (aged 84)
- Position: Midfielder

Senior career*
Years	Team	Apps	(Gls)
–1930	Sporting Sagunto		
1930–1940	Real Madrid	58	(0)
1940–1943	Granada	52	(1)
Total		110	(1)

Managerial career
- 1940–1941: Granada (player-coach)
- 1943–1945: Murcia
- 1945–1947: Córdoba
- 1947–1948: Murcia
- 1948–1949: Levante
- 1950–1951: Hércules
- 1951–1952: Plus Ultra
- 1952–1953: Córdoba
- 1956–1957: Caudal
- 1960: Badajoz
- 1960: Cultural Leonesa
- * Club domestic league appearances and goals

Antonio Bonet Silvestre (14 August 1908 – March 1993) was a Spanish football midfielder and manager.
