= Ciriaco Errasti =

Spanish footballer (1904–1984)

Personal information
- Full name: Ciriaco Errasti Siunaga
- Date of birth: 8 August 1904
- Place of birth: Eibar, Spain
- Date of death: 8 November 1984 (aged 80)
- Place of death: Eibar, Spain
- Height: 1.74 m (5 ft 8 1/2 in)
- Position: Defender

Youth career
- Lagun Artea

Senior career*
Years	Team	Apps	(Gls)
?–1925	Eibarresa		
1925–1931	Alavés		
1931–1936	Real Madrid	61	(0)
1936	Alavés		

International career
1930–1936	Spain	14	(0)
- * Club domestic league appearances and goals

Ciriaco Errasti Suinaga (8 August 1904 – 8 November 1984) was a Spanish footballer who played as a defender.

== Club career ==
Born in Eibar, Gipuzkoa, Ciriaco signed with Deportivo Alavés in 1925, from local UD Eibarresa. He was part of the squad that promoted from Segunda División in 1929–30, thus reaching La Liga for the first time, then appeared in 16 games out of 18 as the Basque retained their newfound status after finishing eighth.

In the 1931 summer Ciriaco signed with Real Madrid, going on to be regularly played during his five-year spell and winning two national championships and as many Copa del Rey trophies, while forming an effective defensive partnership with former Alavés teammate Jacinto Quincoces; he also missed most of his third season with the Merengues due to injury.

After the beginning of the Spanish Civil War, and having played in 117 official matches with Real Madrid, Ciriaco returned to his hometown and joined former side Alavés, but retired from football shortly after.

== International career ==
Ciriaco gained 14 caps for Spain during six years. He was part of Spain's squad for the 1928 Summer Olympics, but he did not play in any matches. His debut came on 1 January 1930 in a 1–0 friendly home win against Czechoslovakia, in Barcelona.

Selected to the squad that appeared in the 1934 FIFA World Cup in Italy, Ciriaco appeared against Brazil and the hosts, in an eventual quarterfinal exit.

== Life after football / Death ==
After retiring, Ciriaco continued living in Eibar and worked for several years in the Banco Guipuzcoano (Bank of Gipuzkoa). He died on 8 November 1984 at the age of 80.
