= Jaime Lazcano =

Spanish footballer

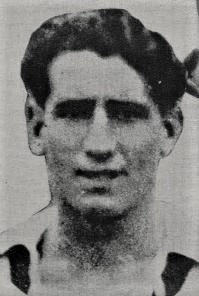

Personal information
- Full name: Jaime Lazcano Escolá
- Date of birth: 30 December 1909
- Place of birth: Pamplona, Spain
- Date of death: 1 June 1983 (aged 73)
- Place of death: Madrid, Spain
- Position: Midfielder

Senior career*
Years	Team	Apps	(Gls)
1928–1935	Real Madrid	81	(40)
1935–1936	Atlético Madrid	11	(1)

International career
1929–1930	Spain	5	(1)
- * Club domestic league appearances and goals

Jaime Lazcano Escolá (5 March 1909 – 1 June 1983), was a Spanish professional footballer who played as a midfielder for Real Madrid, Atlético Madrid and Spain during the 1920s and 1930s. He scored the first ever La Liga goal for Real Madrid on 10 February 1929, and scored four goals in a 5–0 win against Europa.

He was nicknamed "Dramaturgo" as in his time away from football he was a playwright, débuting several of his plays in the town of San Lorenzo de El Escorial.

== Honours ==
Real Madrid

- Spanish Championship: 1931–32, 1932–33
- Copa del Rey: 1933–34
