= Eugenio Hilario =

Spanish footballer

Eugenio Hilario Calvo (6 May 1909 in Tolosa – 20 March 1944) was a Spanish professional association football player.

Eugenio played his career as a forward and spent most of his career at Real Madrid C.F. He scored 32 goals in 57 matches in La Liga, and 9 goals in 32 matches in Copa del Rey.
