= Jacinto Quincoces =

Spanish footballer

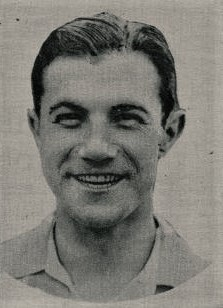

Personal information
- Full name: Jacinto Francisco Fernández de Quincoces López de Arbina
- Date of birth: 17 July 1905
- Place of birth: Barakaldo, Spain
- Date of death: 10 May 1997 (aged 91)
- Place of death: Valencia, Spain
- Height: 1.81 m (5 ft 11 1/2 in)
- Position: Defender

Senior career*
Years	Team	Apps	(Gls)
1920–1931	Deportivo Alavés	18	(0)
1931–1936	Real Madrid	90	(0)
1939–1942	Real Madrid	42	(0)

International career
1928–1936	Spain	25	(0)

Managerial career
- 1941–1943: Real Zaragoza
- 1945: Spain
- 1945–1946: Real Madrid
- 1947–1948: Real Madrid
- 1948–1954: Valencia
- 1954–1955: Atlético Madrid
- 1956–1958: Real Zaragoza
- 1958–1959: Valencia
- 1960: Valencia
- * Club domestic league appearances and goals

Jacinto Francisco Fernández de Quincoces y López de Arbina (17 July 1905 – 10 May 1997) was a Spanish football player and manager, as well as President of the Valencian Pilota Federation. He was a central defender and is regarded as one of the greatest defenders of the inter-war era.

Quincoces was born in 1905 in Barakaldo, Spain. At age 13 he played with a local team, Desierto de Barakaldo, before moving with his family to Vitoria-Gasteiz two years later and joining the Alaves football club. Although making his first professional appearance soon thereafter, he did not remain in the starting lineup. He returned to his hometown Barakaldo on loan from Alaves to the Barakaldo football club, where he spent seven seasons gaining experience and honing his skills. He was recalled to Alaves in 1927 and that year helped the team qualify for the first division.

His exceptional skills as a defender at Alaves eventually caught the attention of the Spanish national team. Quincoces made his first appearances as a Spanish international in the 1928 Summer Olympics, helping the team reach the quarter finals.

Appreciating his excellent performances, FC Barcelona invited him to play with the team for a tour of friendly matches in the USA. The deal fell through, but in 1931 Madrid FC (now Real Madrid) came calling, looking to shore up their defence by signing him and another talented center back, Ciriaco. With the all time great goalkeeper Ricardo Zamora, the three teammates from the Spanish national team formed a solid defense, winning La Liga in their first season together while going undefeated in league play. Quincoces went on to star for Madrid through 1936, when the Spanish Civil War brought a temporary end to professional football in the country. At the end of the war, he returned to Madrid FC, playing from 1939 until his farewell match on 8 December 1942, where he was celebrated after the match in a ceremony honoring him as one of the best players of that era.

On the international level, Quincoces played 25 times for the Spanish national team from 1928 through 1936, including being awarded “best defender of the tournament” at the 1934 World Cup.

His brother Juan had a short career with Alavés, during which the siblings were teammates. His nephew Juan Carlos Díaz Quincoces was also a professional footballer and a Spanish international, usually referred to as 'Quincoces' in recognition of his famous relative (conventionally the paternal surname Díaz would have been used). They worked together at Valencia as coach and player in two spells.

== Playing career ==
- Deportivo Alavés – 1920–1931
- Real Madrid – 1931–1936, 1939–1942 (hiatus due to Spanish Civil War)

== Management career ==
- Real Zaragoza – 1942–1943, 1956–1958
- Spain national football team – 1945
- Real Madrid – 1945–1946, 1947–1948
- Valencia CF – 1948–1954, 1958–1960
- Atlético Madrid – 1954–1955

== President of the FPV ==
Since Quincoces was a Basque pelota pala player before becoming a football professional, when his career finished, he was chosen by the Francoist authorities as President of the Valencian Pilota Federation, believing that Basque and Valencian handball sports were the same. Quincoces declared to the press several times that he was unwilling to undertake this task, but while he was in charge (late 1960s and early 70s) he promoted new measures that resulted in profit for Valencian pilota, such as the beginning of the Youth Championships, compulsory for the trinquets that wanted to host professional tournaments, this was the way pilotaris such as Genovés I and Xatet de Carlet began.

Sporting positions
Preceded by Quesada	Real Madrid CF captain 1936–1942	Succeeded by Sauto
