= Estadio Chamartín =

Stadium in Madrid, Spain (1920–1946)

Chamartín
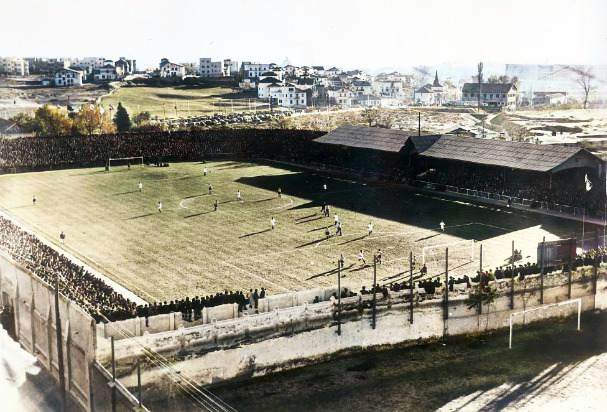
- Interactive map of Chamartín
- Full name: Estadio Chamartín
- Location: Madrid, Spain
- Coordinates: 40.4527°N 3.6868°W
- Owner: Real Madrid
- Operator: Real Madrid
- Capacity: 22,500

Construction
- Opened: 17 May 1924
- Closed: 1946
- Demolished: 1946
- Architect: José María Castell

Tenant
- Real Madrid CF (1924–1946)

Estadio Chamartín was a multi-use stadium in Madrid, Spain. It was initially used as the stadium of Real Madrid matches before the Santiago Bernabéu Stadium opened in 1947. The stadium held 22,500 people and was built in 1924.

The stadium was inaugurated on 17 May 1924, with a 3–2 victory for Real Madrid against Newcastle United.

== Closing and demolition ==
The final official match at the stadium was played on 13 May 1946, with Real Madrid winning 2–0 against CD Alcoyano in the quarter-finals of the Spanish Cup. Three days later, Real Madrid played the "closing" friendly against Málaga in which the visitors prevailed 5–4. Demolition works proceeded the day after.

== History ==
After the Spanish Civil War, Chamartín stadium was left in a deplorable state, having been used during the conflict as an internment site for prisoners and later as a storage depot for material. Wood from its facilities had been used as fuel, and only the framework of its stand remained. The club had to restore the ground before it could be used again. On 22 October 1939, the stadium reopened for a match between Madrid and Atletic, which Madrid won.
