= History of Real Madrid CF =

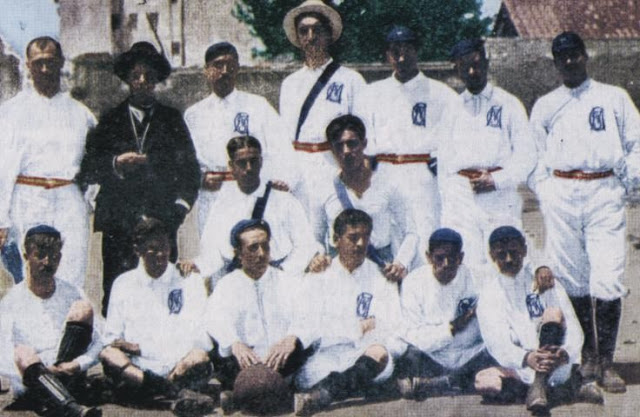
Madrid FC team in 1902, the year of its foundation

Real Madrid Club de Fútbol is a professional football club based in Madrid, Spain. The club was formed in 1902 as Madrid Football Club, and played its first competitive match on 13 May 1902, when it lost 3–1 in the semi-final of the Campeonato de Copa de S.M. Alfonso XIII against Barcelona. Real Madrid played against other local clubs in various regional tournaments, that served as qualifiers for the Copa del Rey, from 1902 to 1940. In 1929, the club became one of the founding members of La Liga, Spain's first national league. As of 2024, Real is one of only three clubs never to have been relegated from the top level of Spanish football, the others being Athletic Bilbao and Barcelona.

From 1902 to 1929, Real won the Copa del Rey five times and the regional championship 15 times. Real Madrid had a successful start in La Liga, finishing second in the competition's first season, and winning the league in 1932 for the first time. In the 1947–48 season, Madrid finished eleventh, which remains, as of 2026, the club's lowest final position. Real Madrid won La Liga four times and the European Cup five times during the 1950s. However, the most successful period for the club in terms of domestic titles was the 1960s, when Real Madrid won eight league championships. It won its first double of league championship and national cup in 1962. Real is also the only Spanish football team to win five consecutive titles, a feat which it has achieved on two occasions (1960–65 and 1985–90).

In addition to their domestic success, Real Madrid's reputation as a major club was established by their outstanding record in the European Cup. To date, they have been crowned champions of Europe a record fifteen times. Alfredo Di Stéfano, Ferenc Puskás and other famous players helped the club win the European Cup five times in a row between 1956 and 1960, which included a memorable 7–3 Hampden Park final against German side Eintracht Frankfurt in 1960. The club won the trophy for a sixth time in 1966 with a team known as the Ye-Ye that defeated Yugoslavian club Partizan 2–1 in the final while being composed entirely of Spanish-born players, a first in the competition. They were also runners-up in 1962, 1964 and 1981. Winning the competition five consecutive times saw Real permanently awarded the original cup and earning the right to wear a multiple-winner badge since 2000. They have also won the UEFA Cup twice and were twice runners-up in the European Cup Winners' Cup.

In 1996, president Lorenzo Sanz appointed Fabio Capello as coach. Although his tenure lasted only one season, Real Madrid were proclaimed league champions and several important players arrived at the club, such as Roberto Carlos, Predrag Mijatović, Davor Šuker and Clarence Seedorf, to strengthen a squad that already boasted the likes of Raúl, Fernando Hierro and Fernando Redondo. As a result, Real Madrid, with the addition of Fernando Morientes in 1997, finally ended its 32-year wait for the seventh European Cup in 1998 under manager Jupp Heynckes, defeating Juventus 1–0 in the final thanks to a goal from Mijatović. Real Madrid would go on to win again in 2000, 2002 (under manager Vicente del Bosque), 2014 (under manager Carlo Ancelotti), 2016, 2017, 2018 (under manager Zinedine Zidane), 2022 and 2024 (again under Ancelotti). Madrid are also eight-time winners of the Intercontinental Cup/FIFA Club World Cup, defeating Peñarol, Vasco da Gama, Club Olimpia, San Lorenzo, Kashima Antlers, Grêmio, Al Ain and Al Hilal in 1960, 1998, 2002, 2014, 2016, 2017, 2018 and 2022 respectively.

== Early years ==
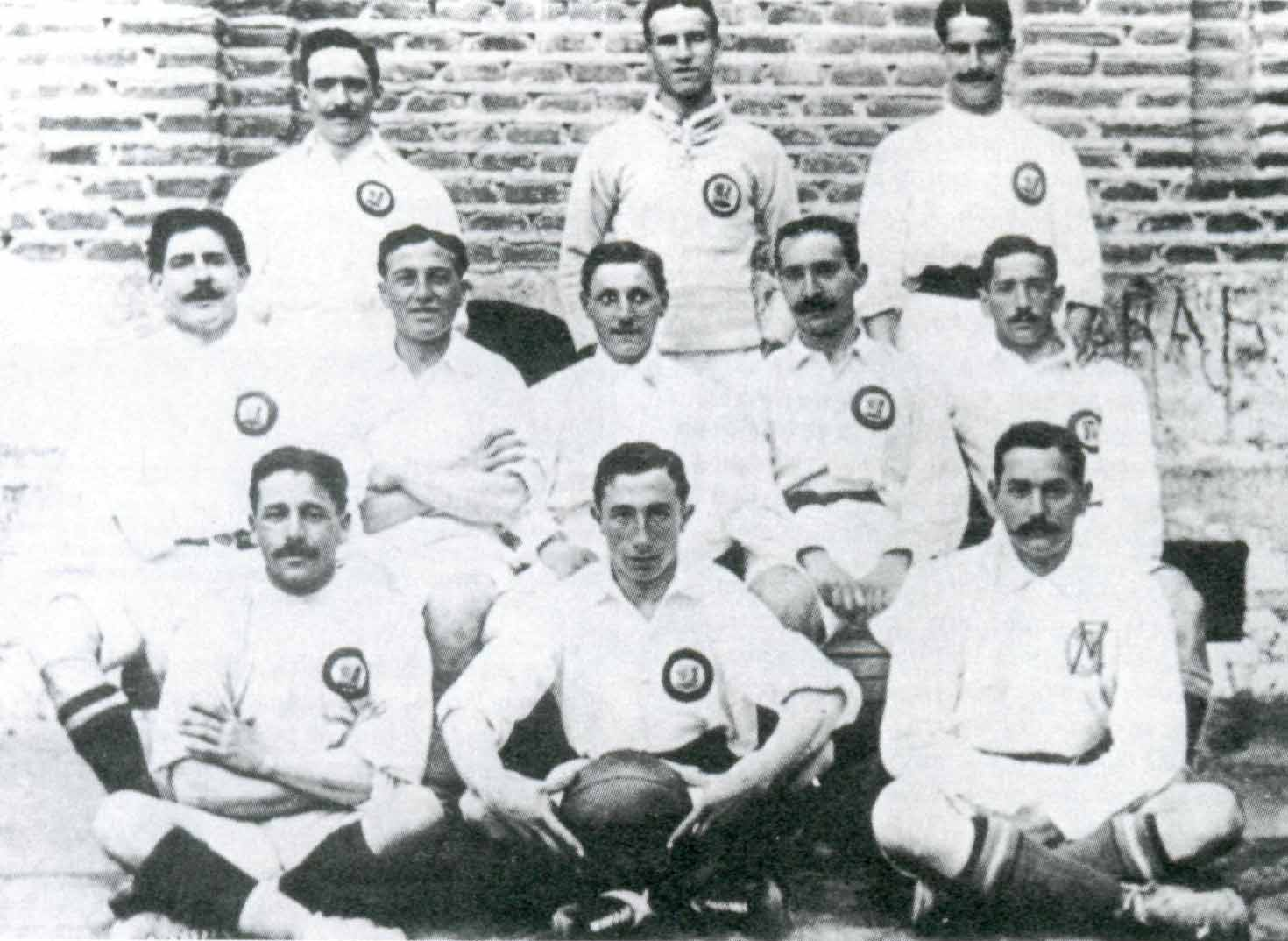
Madrid FC team in 1906. The club won its second Copa del Rey that year.

Real Madrid's origins go back to when football was introduced to Madrid by the academics and students of the Institución Libre de Enseñanza. They founded (Sociedad) Sky Football in December 1897, commonly known as La Sociedad (The Society) as it was the only club based in Madrid, playing on Sunday mornings at Moncloa. In 1900, conflict between members caused some of them to leave and create a new club, called Nueva Sociedad de Foot-ball (New Society of Football), to distinguish themselves from Sky Football. Nueva Sociedad was founded in October 1900 in a tavern on Calle de la Cruz. The dissenters were led by Julián Palacios, recognized as the first Real Madrid president.

The other dissenters included brothers and future presidents of Real Madrid, Juan Padrós and Carlos Padrós, as well as Adolfo Meléndez, Antonio Neyra, Manolo Mendía, Varela, and the Giralt brothers (Armando, José and Mario). In October 1901, Nueva Sociedad de Foot-ball was renamed as Madrid Football Club. The first field the club used to play matches was a camp in Moncloa, located on the current Vallehermoso street. They utilised the El Solar de Estrada in 1901, which was owned by Claudio Estrada, a member of the club and the father-in-law of president Julián Palacios. The club later played matches at the Tiro del Pichón between 1901 and 1902.

On 6 March 1902, after a new Board presided by Juan Padrós had been elected, Madrid Football Club was officially founded. The Padrós brothers summoned other football enthusiasts to a meeting in the back room of Al Capricho, the family's fashion business. They viewed football as a mass sport that should be accessible to representatives of all social classes, and thought the new club should embody that idea. The brothers proposed the name, Madrid Football Club, which was unanimously accepted. The membership fee was also set, two pesetas a month, and the color of the shirt was chosen to be white in honour of a famous English team Corinthian, which Juan Padrós had met on one of his trips. The club had 28 founding socios (members).

The club played its first ever match on 9 March 1902. It featured two teams of Madrid FC players and was played between the streets of Alcalá and Goya, next to the old Plaza de Toros. The two teams wore blue and red respectively, with the blue team winning the match 1–0. Madrid paid an annual rent of 150 pesetas for the pitch, and the players changed into their playing kits in a tavern called La Taurina. The regulations governing the club, comprising 22 articles, were drafted on 18 April and approved by provincial governor José Sanchez Guerra on 22 April 1902. Madrid FC played its first match against another club on 2 May 1902 at the Hipódromo in a friendly against New Foot-Ball Club that ended in a 1–1 draw.

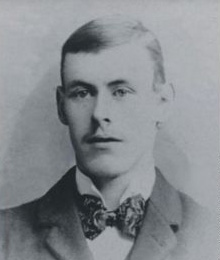
Arthur Johnson a pioneering figure in Real Madrid's early history and the club's first coach. He scored Real Madrid’s first-ever goal in 1902.

Carlos Padrós, wanting to demonstrate that the club could organize matches against other teams, helped organize the 1902 Copa de la Coronación in honour of the coronation of Alfonso XIII. He convinced the mayor of Madrid, Alberto Aguilera, to donate a silver cup as the prize for the winning team. Padrós contacted the captains of Barcelona, Club Español de Foot-Ball, Bizcaya (a combination of Athletic Club and Bilbao Football Club) and New Foot-Ball Club and invited them to enter the competition. The event was the first national football tournament played in Spain and was held at the Hipódromo. Madrid FC contested its first competitive match in the semi-finals of the Copa de la Coronación on 13 May. Arthur Johnson scored the club's first competitive goal in a 1–3 loss to Barcelona. This was also the first El Clásico. Madrid secured its first competitive victory defeating Club Español de Football (now Espanyol) 3–2 on 16 May 1902. On 23 May 1902, Alfonso Albéniz became the first player to leave FC Barcelona in order to join Madrid.

Madrid was invited to participate in festivities at El Escorial in August 1902, part of which included a match against Moncloa. The match was played next to the facade of the monastery on 11 August and ended with a 6–5 score favourable to Madrid. The club was awarded two ceramic plates which represent the first trophy in its history. Carlos Padrós initiated the establishment of the Madrid Association of Foot-ball Clubs, a football association responsible for the administration of the sport in Madrid, in December 1902. He also became the association's first president. The Association organized the 1903 Campeonato de Madrid, the inaugural edition of the regional championship of Madrid. (Note: The regional championship of Madrid was first held in 1903 as the "Campeonato de Madrid" (Madrid Championship). It was renamed as the "Campeonato Regional de Madrid" (Madrid Regional Championship) for the 1906–13 seasons. The Royal Spanish Football Federation, founded on 29 September 1913, took over the competition from 1913. It was called the "Campeonato Regional Centro" (Central Regional Championship) between 1913 and 1931, the "Campeonato Regional Mancomunado" (Joint Regional Championship) from 1932 to 1936, and the "Campeonato Regional del Centro" (Regional Championship of the Center) during its final season in 1939–40.) Padrós resigned as president of the association in December 1903, and it dissolved in March 1904. Madrid played their first match outside of the Community of Madrid against Club Español de Fútbol at the Parc de la Ciutadella in Barcelona on 24 February 1903. The club participated in the inaugural edition of the Copa del Rey held at the Hipódromo in 1903. Madrid defeated Espanyol 4–1 in the competition's first match on 6 April 1903. The club finished runners-up after losing 3–2 in the final to Athletic Bilbao. The match was also the first El Viejo Clásico.

The club faced a major crisis during the 1903–04 season. A dispute between the members in October 1903 resulted in several players leaving the club to form Club Español de Madrid. They included Antonio Neyra, Enrique Aruabarrena, Pérez, Manuel Vallarino, Ramón Cárdenas, and brothers Mario, Armando and José Giralt. Five other Madrid players also left the club to join Moncloa. This precipitated a merger with Moderno on 30 January 1904. Carlos Padrós was elected president post-merger. The club officially adopted the name Madrid–Moderno due to the merger, although most members, players and fans generally continued to refer to it as Madrid. The club dropped the Moderno name before the next season. Madrid retroactively secured the 1903 Campeonato de Madrid trophy, won by Moderno, as a result of their merger. The club won the first Madrid derby defeating Atlético Madrid 6–0 on 13 November 1904 in a friendly at the Plaza de Toros. Madrid was a founding member of the Fédération Internationale de Football Association (FIFA) on 21 May 1904.

Madrid qualified for the 1905 Copa del Rey by defeating Moncloa 2–0 to win the 1905 Campeonato de Madrid at the Plaza de Toros on 2 April 1905. Madrid defeated Athletic Bilbao 1–0 in the 1905 Copa del Rey final thanks to a goal by Manuel Prast, to win the first official title in their history. The club secured four consecutive titles by winning again in 1906, 1907 and 1908, becoming the first team to win four consecutive Copa del Rey titles. Madrid was allowed to keep the original trophy following its third consecutive victory in 1907. The club also won four consecutive regional championships between 1905 and 1908. On 23 October 1905, Madrid organised a friendly against French side Gallia to commemorate the visit of French President Émile Loubet to Madrid. It was the club's first match against a foreign side and the first international match to take place in Madrid. In 1907, Madrid lost a match to a team of seminarians from Royal English College in Valladolid, with Edward Power scoring five goals in a 6–2 victory. In 1957, then-club president Santiago Bernabéu was quoted as saying that the "game changed the whole history of football in Spain by showing us how football should be played." Madrid became one of the founding sides of the Royal Spanish Football Federation on 4 January 1909, when club president Adolfo Meléndez signed the foundation agreement of the Spanish football association.

Club vice-president and player José Ángel Berraondo, who was instrumental in helping Madrid secure four Copa del Rey titles, left the club in 1909. He returned to his hometown of San Sebastián and became one of the founding members of Real Sociedad. Arthur Johnson was appointed as manager of Madrid FC in 1910 becoming the first manager in the club's history. Santiago Bernabéu made his debut for the club on 3 March 1912 when he was only 16 years old in a friendly against English Sports Club. In 1912, Madrid moved to their first permanent home ground called Campo de O'Donnell, after previously moving between some minor grounds. The venue was inaugurated on 31 October 1912 with a match against Sporting Club de Irún. By 1912, Real Madrid had around 450 members.

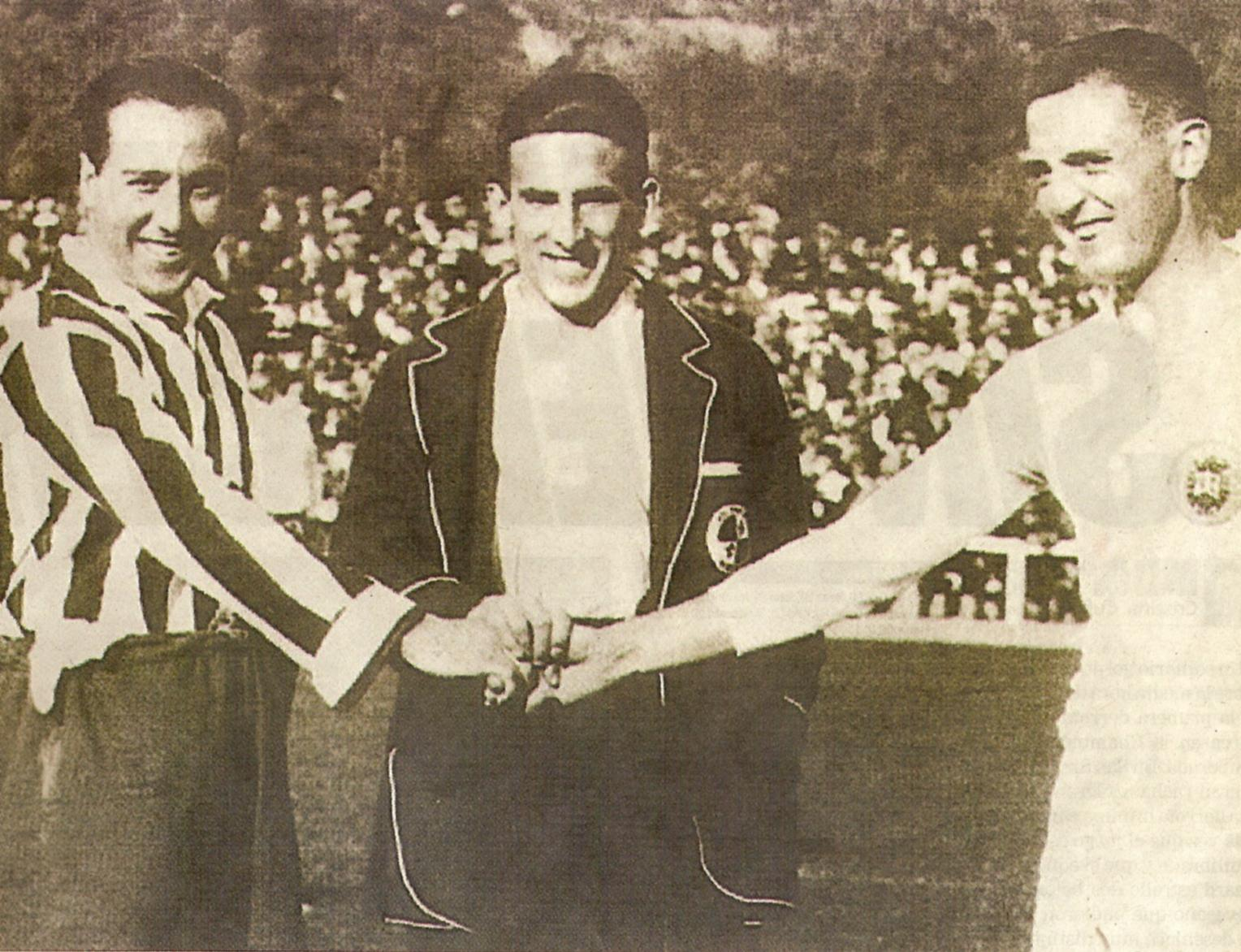
Santiago Bernabéu as captain (pictured right) before a derby match against Atlético Madrid in 1922.

Madrid secured their 6th regional championship during the 1912–13 season, and three consecutive regional titles between 1916 and 1918. The semi-finals of the 1916 Copa del Rey involved four matches between Madrid and FC Barcelona. Madrid defeated Barcelona 4–2 in the second replay match to qualify for the final, where it lost to Athletic Bilbao. The club won its fifth Copa del Rey trophy in 1917 defeating Arenas in the final, and won its tenth regional championship during the 1919–20 season. The club's name was changed to Real Madrid Football Club after King Alfonso XIII granted the title of real (Spanish for "royal") to the club on 29 June 1920. The royal patronage also permitted the club to add the royal crown to its crest.

Real Madrid visited Italy in 1920 and played several friendlies against local sides including Bologna, Livorno, and Genoa, marking the first foreign tour in its history. Santiago Bernabéu left the club to join Athletic Madrid ahead of the 1920–21 season. He would only play one match, before re-joining Real Madrid in 1921. The Madrid team wore black armbands in a match against Athletic Madrid on 5 Match 1922, in honour of the deaths of Madrid player Sotero Aranguren and Athletic Bilbao player Pichichi, becoming the first team to make such a gesture. The club had to leave the Campo de O'Donnell in 1923, because the owner wanted to develop the land, and adopted the Campo de Ciudad Lineal as their new home stadium. The ground was leased to Madrid by the heirs of urban planner Arturo Soria. It was the first grass playing field in the club's history, contained a pitch that was 108 metres long by 68 metres wide, and had a capacity for 8,000 spectators. Madrid defeated Real Unión 2-0 in the inaugural match played at the Ciudad Lineal on 29 April 1923.

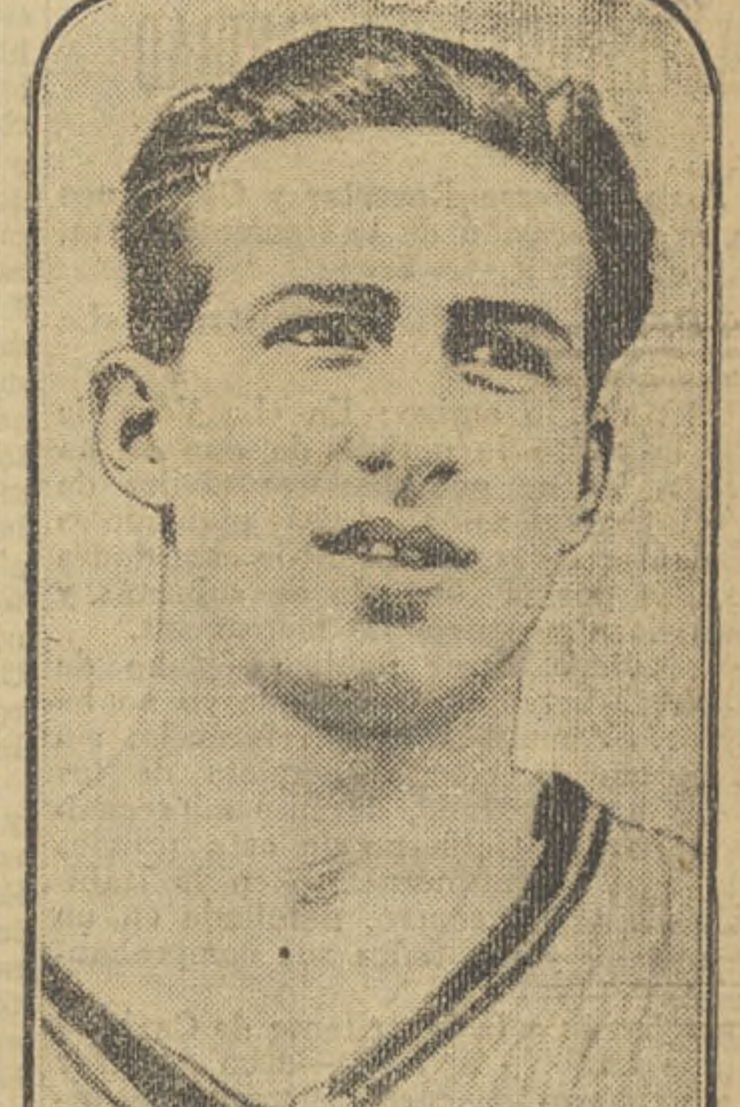
Juan Monjardín, one of Real Madrid's first major stars and a prolific forward during the club's early years.

Construction of the Estadio Chamartín was completed in 1924, and it would serve as Madrid's home stadium until the Santiago Bernabéu Stadium opened in 1947. The former stadium could accommodate as many as 16,000 supporters, expanded to 22,000 later in the 1930s. The Chamartín was inaugurated on 17 May 1924 with a 3–2 victory over Newcastle United. Real Madrid embarked on its first tour of England in 1925 playing friendlies against Newcastle United, Birmingham City and Tottenham Hotspur. Although the club lost all three matches, it received praise from the British press for its talent and playing style. Real Madrid switched to wearing black shorts for the 1925–26 season, however following a series of poor results, club president Pedro Parages switched back to the all-white kit. The club toured the Americas for the first time in 1927, visiting Argentina, Uruguay, Peru, Cuba, Mexico and the United States over a period of three and half months.

During this period, Real Madrid continued its regional dominance in the Campeonato Regional Centro winning the championship in the 1921–22, 1922–23, 1923–24, 1925–26, and 1926–27 seasons. Madrid reached the 1924 Copa del Rey final but lost to Real Unión. The Copa Federación Centro, a football competition contested by clubs from the Castile region, and a second-tier competition to the Campeonato was first held between 6 May and 17 June 1923 and won by Real Madrid. The next edition was held in 1928 and was also won by Madrid.

=== Establishment of La Liga ===
Real Madrid participated in the Torneo de Campeones during the 1927–28 season. The competition involved the six teams that had previously won the Copa del Rey, and was played with a make shift schedule. The teams had been scheduled to play each other in a double round-robin format, however all matches could not be played, and some teams including Real only played 9 games. The Torneo de Campeones served as a rehearsal for the establishment of La Liga, the first national football league in Spain, in the following season. Real Madrid led the inaugural 1929 La Liga season for the first ten matchdays; however, after dropping points in the next three games, they dropped to third behind Club de Getxo and then Barcelona. A string of four victories enabled Madrid to retake the lead ahead of the last match, but a loss to Athletic Bilbao on the final matchday meant they finished runners-up, just one point behind Barcelona. Madrid reached the finals of the Copa del Rey in 1928–29 and 1930 but lost on both occasions. Real Madrid acquired goalkeeper Ricardo Zamora from Espanyol for 150,000 pesetas (900€) in 1930. He made his debut on 5 October 1930 against Athletic Madrid in the Campeonato Regional Centro. On 14 April 1931, the arrival of the Second Spanish Republic caused the club to lose the title "Real" and the royal crown on its emblem, going back to being named Madrid Football Club.

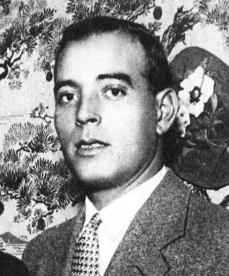
Goalkeeper Ricardo Zamora

Madrid won its first Primera División title in the 1931–32 season finishing the league unbeaten. They retained the title the following year equaling Athletic Bilbao for most league title wins, and were close to clinching the domestic double, but lost the 1933 Copa del Presidente de la República final (Note: The Copa del Rey, as it was known for the most part of its history, was renamed to Copa del Presidente de la República by the Second Spanish Republic in 1932 and then to Copa del Generalísimo by the Francoist government in 1939.) to Athletic Bilbao 1–2. After a gap of 17 years, the club would secure their sixth domestic cup in 1934 defeating Valencia 2–1. Madrid won their seventh Copa in 1936, defeating Barcelona 2–1. The club consistently finished as runners-up in La Liga between 1933–34 and 1935–36. In the regional championship, Madrid won a record eight consecutive Campeonato Regional Centro titles between 1928–29 and 1935–36, winning a record 23 regional championships in total. No football competitions were held in Spain for three seasons between 1936–37 and 1938–39 due to the Spanish Civil War. Madrid finished fourth in the 1939–40 La Liga season, the first one held after the Civil War. The 1939 Campeonato Mancomunado Centro, where Madrid finished runners-up to Athletic-Aviación, was the last edition of the regional championship. The club reached the final of the 1940 Copa del Generalísimo but finished runners-up. On 1 January 1941, Madrid Football Club changed their name to Real Madrid Club de Fútbol and restored the royal crown on their crest.

Real Madrid finished sixth, second and tenth in the league in 1940–41, 1941–42 and 1942–43 respectively. On 13 June 1943, Madrid beat Barcelona 11–1 in a controversial second leg match of the 1943 Copa del Generalísimo semi-finals. It remains the largest victory margin in the history of El Clásico. According to football writer Sid Lowe: "There have been relatively few mentions of the game [since] and it is not a result that has been particularly celebrated in Madrid. Indeed, the 11–1 occupies a far more prominent place in Barcelona's history. This was the game that first formed the identification of Madrid as the team of the dictatorship and Barcelona as its victims." Fernando Argila, Barcelona's reserve goalkeeper from the 1943 match, said: "There was no rivalry. Not, at least, until that game." Madrid lost to Athletic Bilbao 0–1 in the final.

== The Bernabéu Era (1943–1978) ==
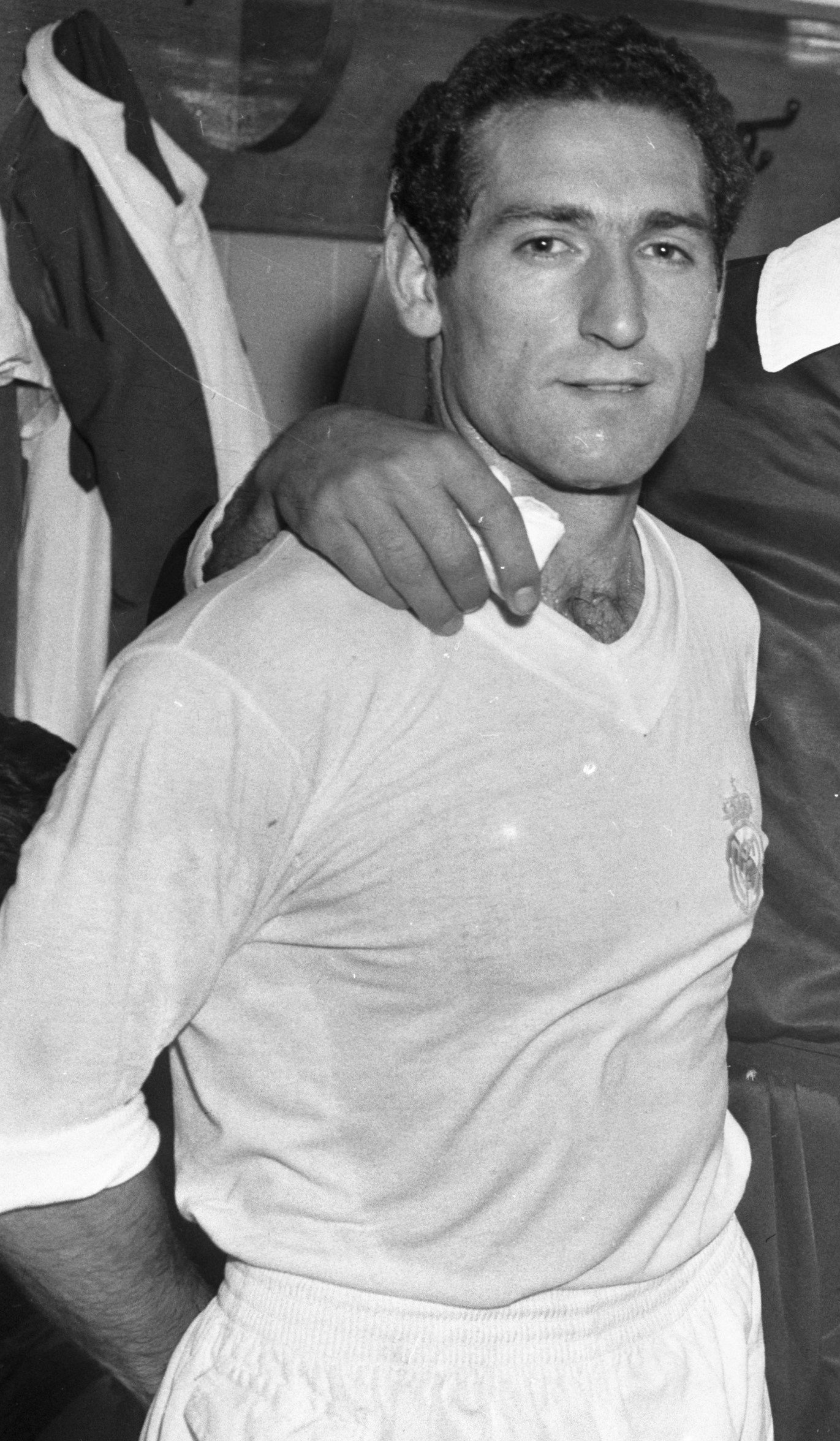
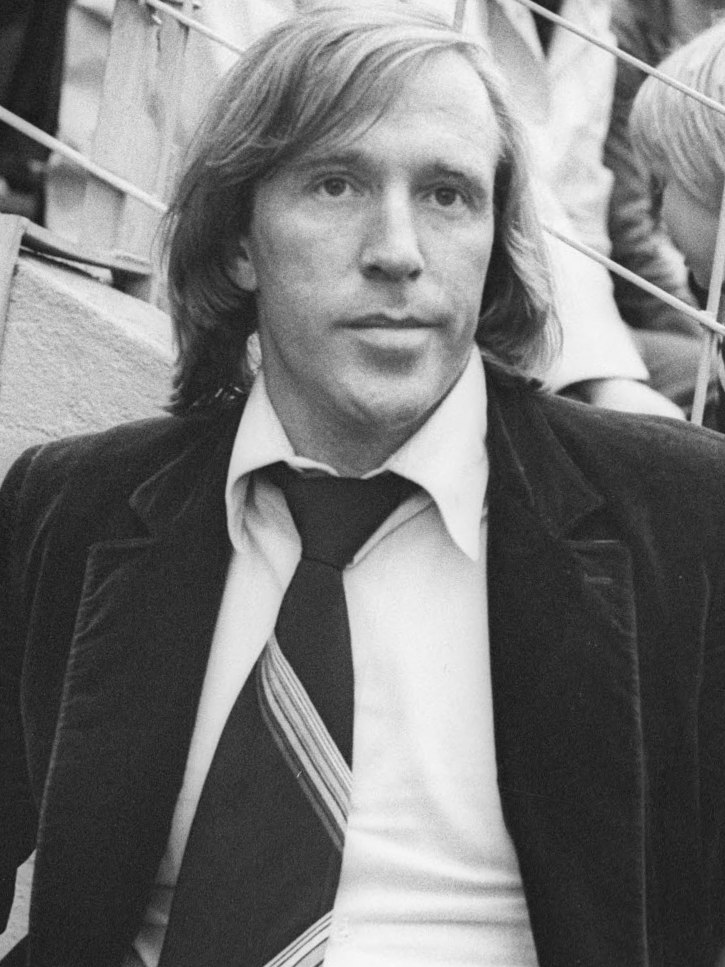
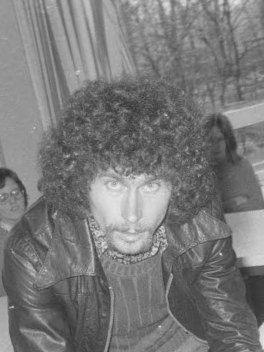
Paco Gento (left), the club's longest-serving captain from 1962 until his retirement in 1971, became the first player to win six European Cups. Following Gento's retirement, Santiago Bernabéu brought in 1974 World Cup winners Günter Netzer and Paul Breitner.

Before becoming president in 1943, Santiago Bernabéu had already carried out the functions of player, first-team captain, club maintenance, first-team manager and director in an association with the club that would last nearly 70 years. He was responsible for rebuilding the club after the Civil War and oversaw the construction of the Santiago Bernabéu Stadium and the Ciudad Deportiva.

Bernabéu also reorganized the club at all levels in what would become the normal operating hierarchy of professional clubs in the future, giving every section and level of the club independent technical teams and recruiting staff, such as Raimundo Saporta. Moreover, under Bernabéu's tutelage, during the 1950s former Real Madrid Amateurs player Miguel Malbo founded Real Madrid's youth academy, or "cantera," known today as La Fábrica.

Finally, beginning in 1953, Bernabéu embarked upon a strategy of signing world-class players from Spain and abroad, the most prominent being Argentine Alfredo di Stéfano. During Bernabéu's presidency, many of Real Madrid's most legendary names played for the club, including Di Stéfano, Ferenc Puskás, Francisco Gento, Héctor Rial, Raymond Kopa, José Santamaría, Miguel Muñoz, Amancio and Santillana.

It was under Bernabéu's guidance that Real Madrid established itself as a major force both in Spanish and European football. Before dying in 1978, Bernabéu had been the club's president for almost 35 years, during which his club won 1 Intercontinental Cup, 6 European Cups, 16 league titles, 6 Spanish Cups, 2 Latin Cups, and 1 Copa Eva Duarte.

== The De Carlos Era (1978–1985) ==
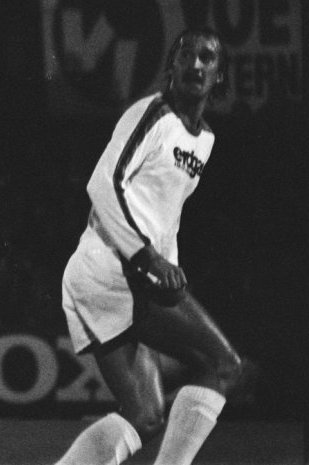
Uli Stielike was Santiago Bernabéu's last major European signing.

After a brief period as interim president, Raimundo Saporta called for elections. The club's treasurer, Luis de Carlos, resigned in order to run for president. 26 July 1978 was the deadline for candidates to apply in order to run for office. De Carlos submitted 3,352 documents endorsing his candidacy, while the rest – gynaecologist Campos Gil and florist José Daguerre – did not get the minimum number required in time. This called off the election and Luis de Carlos was proclaimed president of Real Madrid.

On 4 June 1980, the Santiago Bernabéu Stadium hosted the Copa del Rey final between Real Madrid and Real Madrid Castilla, the club's second team that was initially founded on 21 July 1972. Castilla managed to defeat four First Division teams – Hércules, Athletic Bilbao, Real Sociedad and Sporting de Gijón – to reach the final. Real Madrid defeated Castilla, coached by the sorely-missed Juanjo, by a score of 6–1.

Later in the year, France Football magazine named Real Madrid "Best European Team" of 1980. The jury took into account the two national titles the team won that year – La Liga and the Copa del Rey – and the fact that they reached the semi-finals of the European Cup that season.

Despite the previous year's successes, the 1980–81 season had an unpleasant finish for Madrid. On 26 April 1981, they lost the league title when the victory chant was already being sung in Valladolid. Real Sociedad, who drew 2–2 against Sporting de Gijón in the last minute at El Molinón, claimed the title. Barely one month later, in the 1981 European Cup Final on 27 May, an Alan Kennedy goal gave Liverpool the European Cup title over Madrid.

The professional Real Madrid squad was one of four teams of the Primera División to back the strike called on 11 April 1982. On that day, the Whites played at Castellón with Castilla footballers and defeated the hosts 1–2.

The final of the 1982 FIFA World Cup took place at the Santiago Bernabéu. In the match, Italy outplayed West Germany and won 3–1. Many spectators remembered the joy that the President of Italy Sandro Pertini showed each time the Italian side scored.

With the presidential elections on the horizon, candidate Luis de Carlos introduced Alfredo Di Stéfano and Amancio Amaro as coaches of the first team and Castilla, respectively, on 19 May 1982. "The Arrow," as Di Stéfano was popularly known, initially left Madrid in 1964 only to return 18 years later. In the election, de Carlos defeated Ramón Mendoza and invited Di Stéfano, who signed to manage the team on a two-year contract. His first season in charge is best remembered by the bizarre fact of five trophies closely lost, four of them in four finals (Supercopa, European Cup Winners' Cup, Copa del Rey and Copa de La Liga). Besides that, in La Liga the squad finished in second place a single point behind champions basque-side Athletic Bilbao after losing 0–1 against former Di Stefano club Valencia in the ultimate match at Mestalla Stadium. Madrid were leading most of the rounds before the game and only needed a draw to clinch the title.

Once the 1983–84 season had ended, Di Stéfano again said goodbye to Real Madrid. Twenty-one years later he went through the same experience. His contract ended on 30 June 1984 and Luis de Carlos decided not to re-sign him due to the failure to achieve sporting success.

On 12 December 1984, Emilio Butragueño became a European household name with an unforgettable performance against Anderlecht at the Bernabéu. The Belgians were coming off a 3–0 first leg win in Brussels and had the next round of the UEFA Cup in sight, but Butragueño crushed their hopes with a three-goal performance (the others by Valdano [two] and Sanchís) and Real Madrid won convincingly 6–1, progressing on aggregate.

Real Madrid's first two UEFA Cup titles were won back-to-back—the first in 1985 against Hungary's Videoton (3–0 at Sóstói Stadion and 0–1 at Chamartín) and the second over 1. FC Köln in 1986 (5–1 at the Bernabéu and 0–2 at the Olympiastadion in Berlin).

== The Mendoza Era (1985–1995) ==
After two brief stints as a director and an election-time defeat to Luis de Carlos, Ramón Mendoza's became president of Real Madrid in 1985, ushering in the dawn of a new era in the history of the club.

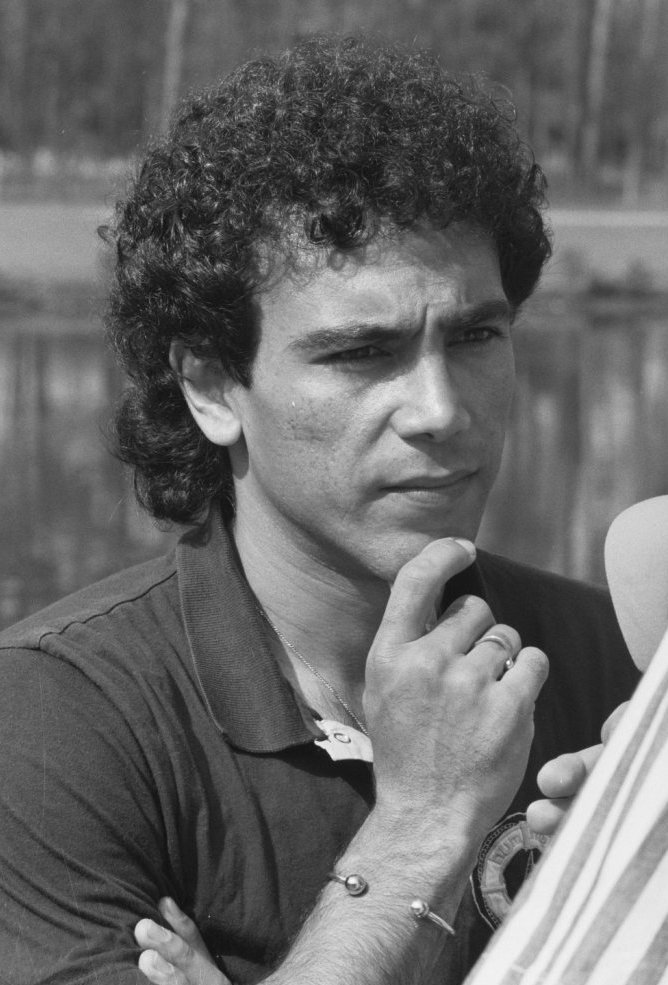
Hugo Sánchez joined the club from local rivals Atlético Madrid in 1985 and won five La Liga titles and four Pichichi Trophies with the club.

=== La Quinta del Buitre ===
"La Quinta del Buitre" was the name given by Spanish sport journalist Julio César Iglesias to the five homegrown Real Madrid players who were at the core of the team that dominated Spanish football in the 1980s. The name, meaning "Vulture's Cohort" in English, was derived from the nickname given to its most charismatic member, Emilio Butragueño. The other four members included Manolo Sanchís, Martín Vázquez, Míchel and Miguel Pardeza.

Sanchís and Martín Vázquez were the first to play for the first team of Real Madrid, making their debut at Murcia on 4 December 1983 under coach Alfredo Di Stéfano. Both played surprisingly well, with Sanchís scoring the game's winner. A few months later, on 5 February 1984, Butragueño debuted in an away match at Cádiz. El Buitre was an instant sensation and scored twice. Pardeza was added to the first team that same season and Míchel followed at the start of the next.

With La Quinta del Buitre (reduced to four members when Pardeza left the club for Zaragoza in 1986), Real Madrid had one of the best teams in Spain and Europe during the second half of the 1980s, winning, amongst others, two UEFA Cups and five Spanish championships in a row. Their record was only blemished by their failure to win the European Cup, and their continued abject defeats against the far superior Milan side of the time.

Martín Vázquez went to play for Torino in 1990, later returning to Madrid in 1992 only to leave again in 1995 for Deportivo de La Coruña. Butragueño left the club in 1995 and Míchel in 1996, both joining Atlético Celaya in Mexico.

Sanchís was the only member of La Quinta to play his entire career with Madrid. By winning the Champions League twice (in 1998 and 2000), he accomplished what La Quinta had failed to achieve in its glory days. He retired in 2001 as the last active member of the famous cohort at the age of 37.

== The Sanz era (1995–2000) ==

2000 UEFA Champions League Final starting lineup

After ten-and-a-half years in office, Ramón Mendoza handed in his irrevocable resignation on 20 November 1995. He was relieved by Lorenzo Sanz, who held recourse to Club by-law 49 to get elected as heir to Mendoza by the 11 directors who continued on the Board of Directors following the transfer of power. On 20 May 1996, Lorenzo Sanz presented Fabio Capello as new head coach of Real Madrid. The Italian trainer landed in Madrid borne out by his five successful seasons with Milan (with whom he won the 1994 Champions League) to replace Arsenio Iglesias, who managed the team on a temporary basis after coach Jorge Valdano resigned. Although winning the league, however, Capello left Madrid after just one season, saying years later did so because he did not settle at Madrid as well as he would have wanted; he returned to Milan.

Replacing Capello was the German Jupp Heynckes, who led the team to win the much-awaited Champions League/European Cup title, the team's last having come in 1966. In the Final, held at the Amsterdam Arena on 20 May 1998, the Merengues conquered their seventh top European trophy with a goal by Pedja Mijatović against Juventus, who were the favourites on the night. Despite conquering Europe, Heynckes was fired at the end of the year and replaced by José Antonio Camacho, who himself resigned just months later in July 1998 before the actual season even began. The team then hired Guus Hiddink to take the reins of the squad, his first challenge being the 1998 Intercontinental Cup. An extraordinary goal by Raúl in Tokyo sealed a 2–1 end result for Los Blancos over Brazilian side Vasco da Gama. Hiddink, however, was fired just after less than a season, with the Welshman John Toshack replacing him in February 1999. Nine months later, during the 1999–2000 season, Toshack was also fired, the seventh coaching change in just three years.

Under the guidance of new manager Vicente del Bosque, Real Madrid claimed their eighth European Cup/Champions League title. The Final, held at the newly built Stade de France in Paris, would host the competition's (including the European Cup era) first-ever Spanish final, pitting Madrid against Valencia on 24 May 2000. The game Madrid comfortably defeat Los Che 3–0, with goals coming from Fernando Morientes, Steve McManaman and Raúl.

== The Galactico/Pérez Era (2000–2006) ==
=== 2000–2003 ===

2002 UEFA Champions League Final starting lineup

In July 2000, Florentino Pérez was elected club president, vowing to erase the club's debt and modernise the club's facilities, though the primary electoral promise that propelled Pérez to victory was the signing of then-Barcelona star Luís Figo. During the campaign, Pérez claimed he had an agreement with the Portuguese winger that would see Figo move to the Bernabéu should Pérez be elected. On July 16, Pérez won the election and indeed, eight days later, Figo was presented with the number 10 shirt for Madrid.

Days later, surrounded by controversy, Real Madrid idol Fernando Redondo, who had openly supported Pérez's opponent Lorenzo Sanz, was sold to Italian giants Milan. During the summer of 2000, Real Madrid signed Claude Makélélé, Albert Celades, Flávio Conceição, César Sánchez, Pedro Munitis and Santiago Solari, although aside from Makélélé and Conceição, the rest had been signed prior to the election of Pérez. Expectations were high as Los Blancos began the 2000–01 season with the possibility of winning five trophies. The club, however, stumbled at the first test, losing the 2000 UEFA Super Cup by a score of 1–2 to 2000 UEFA Cup champions Galatasaray. Later, an injury to Fernando Morientes left Real Madrid without a centre forward, but manager Vicente del Bosque improvised by using youth team graduate Guti in the role, with Real Madrid coping and making good start to both their domestic and European campaigns. They were, however, defeated 2–0 at the Camp Nou against rivals Barcelona and were later eliminated from the Copa del Rey by lowly Toledo, as well as losing the Intercontinental Cup final to a Boca Juniors side led by Martín Palermo and Juan Román Riquelme.

Nonetheless, Real Madrid recovered form and went top of the league table in mid-January, a position they would not relinquish on their way to ultimately winning the title. Madrid also advanced from the second group stage of the Champions League to face Galatasaray in the quarter-finals. Los Merengues lost the first leg in Istanbul 3–2, but recovered to win the tie after a 3–0 victory at the Bernabéu. This would then set-up a replay of the 1999–2000 Champions League semi-final against Bayern Munich. This year, however, Real Madrid would not reach the final, losing 1–3 on aggregate to the eventual champions. Despite the setback, on 26 May, Madrid would crown themselves champions of the first division with an emphatic 5–0 win over Alavés at the Bernabéu. Two goals by Raúl and one each by Guti, Fernando Hierro and Iván Helguera would ensure victory and Real Madrid's 28th league title with two matches left to play.

After reaching an agreement to re-zone and sell the Ciudad Deportiva, Pérez went on to sign Zinedine Zidane in 2001, Ronaldo in 2002 and David Beckham in 2003. The media began referring to the team as "Los Galácticos". The strategy, initially dubbed "Zidanes y Pavones", meant to integrate world stars and youth team graduates together on the squad. It is debatable whether the gamble paid off, as despite winning the UEFA Champions League and an Intercontinental Cup in 2002, followed by La Liga in 2003, the club failed to win a major trophy for the next three seasons. Off the field, the Zidanes y Pavones policy resulted in increased financial success based on the exploitation of the club's high marketing potential around the world, particularly in Asia.

=== 2003–04 season ===
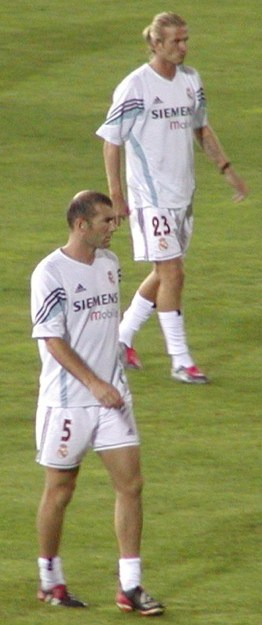
Zinedine Zidane (left) and David Beckham (right) were two prominent Galácticos.

The few days after capturing the 2002–03 league title were mired with controversy. The first controversial decision came when Pérez sacked winning coach Vicente del Bosque after Real's sporting director claimed that Del Bosque was not the right man for the job; they wanted someone young to shake up the team. The turning atmosphere continued when Madrid legend and captain Fernando Hierro left the club after a disagreement with management, as did Steve McManaman. However, the club toured Asia in pre-season and introduced newly signed galáctico David Beckham. Pérez and his directors refused to renew Claude Makélélé's contract with an improved salary, upsetting Makélélé who asked for a transfer, eventually moving to Chelsea. In the final days of the transfer window, Fernando Morientes also left the club, joining French Ligue 1 side Monaco on loan. Real Madrid, with newly appointed coach Carlos Queiroz, began their domestic league slowly after a hard-fought win over Real Betis.

Doubts of the team were quelled, however, when Madrid won 7–2 at home over Real Valladolid. The second half of the season then saw the team giving playing time to youngsters and academy graduates, including Borja, Álvaro Mejía, Antonio Núñez and Juanfran, as Queiroz opted to rotate his squad. Real Madrid also topped their group in the Champions League, advancing to the quarter-finals after defeating Bayern Munich in the round of 16 2–1 on aggregate. However, Madrid's on-loan striker Fernando Morientes punished his team in the quarter-finals, as Madrid saw Monaco progress 5–5 on aggregate via the away goals rule and move on to the semi-finals. Madrid nonetheless kept their Liga form high, leading the table by eight point over second-placed Valencia in February. A poor run of form would await them, however, as they were beaten for the first time at the Bernabéu that season at the hands of Osasuna, 0–3. They recovered their points lead after a win at the Vicente Calderón Stadium over city rivals Atlético Madrid, but more disappointments quickly followed; they lost their final five league games at home to Mallorca, Barcelona and Real Sociedad, and also lost away at both Real Murcia and Deportivo de La Coruña. These defeats allowed all of Valencia, Barça and Deportivo to leapfrog them in the table and end the year in up the top three, respectively, as Real ended the season in a disappointing fourth. Their poor performances continued as they lost the final of the Copa del Rey to Real Zaragoza. Shortly after the end of the season, Queiroz was sacked and replaced by ex-Real Madrid player José Antonio Camacho.

=== 2004–05 season ===
Camacho highlighted the team's poor defensive performances and persuaded Florentino Pérez to spend a total of €45 million on both Argentine defender Walter Samuel and English centre-back Jonathan Woodgate from Roma and Newcastle United, respectively, but failed to sign Arsenal's midfield general Patrick Vieira due to his boldness of asking for a Galáctico-like paycheck in the likeness of Luís Figo's, Zinedine Zidane's, Ronaldo's and David Beckham's. The summer of 2004 also saw the sale of Cameroonian striker Samuel Eto'o, who had been previously loaned out to Mallorca, to archrivals Barcelona.

In addition to the defensive additions, English striker Michael Owen was bought from Liverpool, but the player never settled at Real Madrid. Somewhat ironically, Eto'o would go on to achieve great success with Barcelona in just his first season with the team. Camacho resigned as head coach because of his team's poor performances and was replaced by Mariano García Remón. García Remón's last game was a loss at the hand of Sevilla, where the eventual champions Barça were six points clear from their nearest rivals, and Madrid sitting in lowly fifth. Remón was replaced by Vanderlei Luxemburgo after the winter break, who then signed Thomas Gravesen from Everton to fill the hole in midfield. Madrid failed to progress to the quarter-finals of the Champions League and in the Copa del Rey, but under Luxemburgo, Madrid fought hard to earn second place with 80 points, four points behind Barcelona.

=== 2005–06 season ===
The 2005–06 season began with several new signings, including Júlio Baptista (€20 million), Robinho (€30 million) and Sergio Ramos (€30 million). However, Luxemburgo was not able to find the right formula on the pitch, as Real Madrid's poor form continued and hitting rock bottom after a humiliating 0–3 loss at the hands of Barcelona at the Bernabéu. Luxemburgo would eventually resign and be replaced by Juan Ramón López Caro, the former the manager of Real Madrid Castilla. A brief return to form came to an abrupt halt after losing the first leg of the Copa del Rey semi-finals 6–1 to Zaragoza. Shortly after, Real Madrid were eliminated from the Champions League for a fourth successive year, this time by Arsenal. On 27 February 2006, Florentino Pérez resigned as club president. Real Madrid eventually managed to finish second in the league but did not pose a serious threat to defending champions Barcelona.

== The Calderón Era (2006–2009) ==
=== 2006–07 season ===
On July 2, 2006, Ramón Calderón was elected as club president and subsequently appointed Fabio Capello as the new head coach and Predrag Mijatović as the new sporting director. As new manager of Real Madrid, Capello signed 2006 FIFA World Cup-winning captain Fabio Cannavaro and Emerson, both from embattled Juventus, for a total sum of €23 million; Ruud van Nistelrooy from Manchester United for €15 million; Mahamadou Diarra from Lyon for €26 million; and on a last minute trade-loan José Antonio Reyes, with Júlio Baptista going the other way after a disappointing stint at Madrid. However, Calderón failed to sign Milan's Kaká, Arsenal's Cesc Fàbregas and Chelsea's Arjen Robben, as he had previously promised. Nonetheless, during the January transfer window, he did manage to sign Fluminense left back Marcelo (€6.5M), River Plate forward Gonzalo Higuaín (€13M) and Boca Juniors midfielder Fernando Gago (€18M).

On 16 January 2007, Calderón made some very unfortunate comments about the behaviour of some players in the squad and the Santiago Bernabéu fans, which has put the club in a delicate situation. One of the players that Calderón criticised was David Beckham, who, in January 2007, agreed to a deal to play for the LA Galaxy of Major League Soccer (MLS) at the end of that season. Among others to criticise Beckham was manager Fabio Capello, who at the time vowed never to select Beckham for the team again, although he later withdrew his words. At the end of January, striker Ronaldo left the club for €7.5 million for Milan. On 9 February 2007, Capello allowed Beckham back onto Real's starting 11 in an away match against Real Sociedad. Beckham played well and scored the equalizing goal in the match, a 2–1 triumph. On 24 February 2007, the Madrid Derby between Atlético and Real at the Vicente Calderón finished in a 1–1 draw, with goals coming from Fernando Torres and Gonzalo Higuaín for Atlético and Real respectively.

On 7 March 2007, Real Madrid failed to reach the quarter-finals of the Champions League, stifled by Bayern Munich's strong home performance. Despite winning the home leg 3–2, they lost 2–1 at the Allianz Arena in Munich and were eliminated on an away goals tiebreaker. Bayern also scored the fastest goal in the Champions League during that match, after Roberto Carlos lost the ball after kick-off, which led to Roy Makaay scoring in ten seconds.

On 10 March 2007, Real Madrid contested the Clásico against Barcelona at the Camp Nou. Real Madrid took the lead three times after two goals from Ruud van Nistelrooy and one from Sergio Ramos, but were pegged back by a hat-trick from Lionel Messi, including an injury-time equaliser. Despite the sending off of Oleguer, the Clásico ended 3–3.

Real Madrid managed to find their form consistently for the first time all season as they managed to win seven out of eight of the final twelve games, including a 2–1 home win over Valencia on 21 April 2007 and another 3–2 home win over Sevilla on 6 May 2007. Calderón then went on to say that if the team keep up their great play, he was confident Real Madrid will win the league title and end their four-year wait for a major trophy on June 17.

On 12 May 2007, despite not having Robinho and Beckham on the pitch (due to separate yellow cards given in the previous match against Sevilla), Real Madrid took over first place in the La Liga for the first time all season by defeating Espanyol 4–3, coming back from 1–3 first half deficit. Los Blancos were able to avoid a 3–3 draw thanks to an 89th-minute goal by Gonzalo Higuaín. The Sunday after, Barça dropped points with a 1–1 draw to struggling Real Betis. By virtue of their superior head-to-head record, Real Madrid sat at the top of the Liga table with four crucial matches left to play. The following Sunday, Real managed to beat Recreativo de Huelva 2–3 at the Nuevo Colombino. With the score tied at 2–2, Real Madrid looked set return the lead back to rivals Barcelona until Roberto Carlos scored at the end of the match from a Fernando Gago assist and the squad left Huelva with just three games left to play against, in order, Deportivo, Zaragoza and Mallorca.

On 26 May 2007, Real Madrid put in another excellent performance to defeat Deportivo 3–1 at the Bernabéu. This victory made it six wins in a row for Real Madrid, with goals from Sergio Ramos, Raúl and Ruud van Nistelrooy securing the win. On 9 June, Real played their penultimate league fixture against Zaragoza at La Romareda. The match began badly when Real Madrid were forced to change their starting lineup mere minutes before the start of the match when young defender Miguel Torres suffered an injury during warm-up, tearing his hamstring. In the game, Zaragoza led Real 2–1 near the end of the match, while Barcelona were also winning against Espanyol 2–1. Real's title challenge looked to be over. A late Van Nistelrooy equalizer, however, followed by a last minute Raúl Tamudo goal for Espanyol, sprang Real Madrid's title hopes back into their favour. Sevilla were also held 0–0 away against Mallorca, which meant that a win at home against Mallorca would effectively secure Los Merengues their 30th Spanish league title.

The title was won on 17 June, where Real faced Mallorca at the Bernabéu, while Barcelona and Sevilla faced Gimnàstic de Tarragona and Villarreal, respectively. At half-time, Real were 0–1 down, while Barcelona had surged ahead into a 0–3 lead at the Tarragona; however, three goals in the last half-an-hour secured Real Madrid a 3–1 win and their first league title since 2003. The first goal came from José Antonio Reyes, who scored after a good work from Higuaín. An own goal followed by another delightful goal from Reyes allowed Real to begin celebrating the title. Thousands of Real Madrid fans began going to the Plaza de Cibeles to celebrate the title.

=== 2007–08 and 2008–09 seasons ===
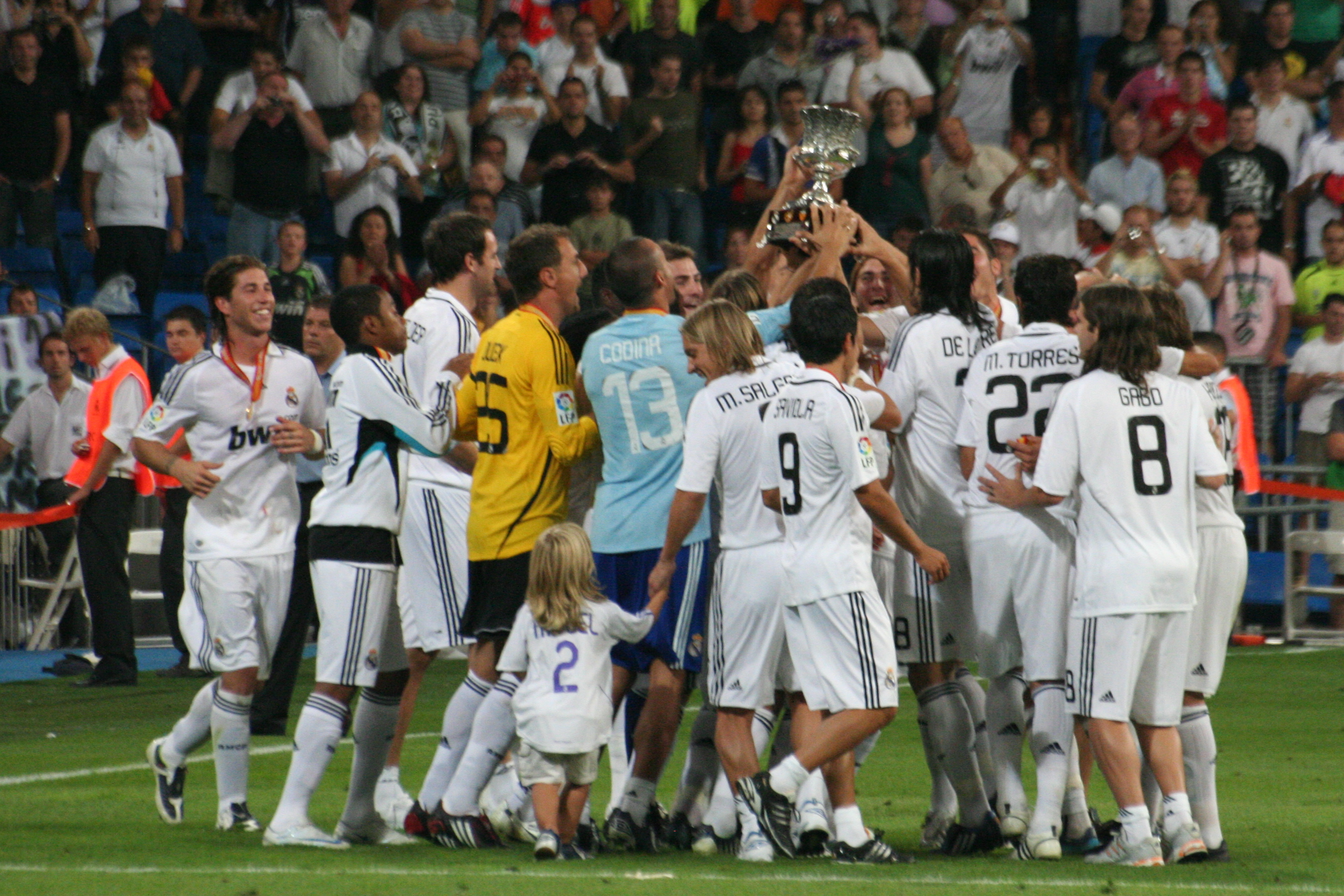
Real Madrid players celebrate their 2008 Supercopa de España win.

On 25 August, Real Madrid kicked off the season in a derby against city rivals Atlético Madrid at the Santiago Bernabéu. It was a highly entertaining display from both sides but Real managed to win 2–1, with goals from Raúl and Wesley Sneijder for Real, while Sergio Agüero scored for Atlético. It was a great start for Real as they showed skill and that they were adapting to the new style of play new manager Bernd Schuster had brought in. On 28 August, Sevilla's Antonio Puerta died after three days in the hospital. The Santiago Bernabéu Trophy, which Real Madrid was about contend for against Sporting CP, was cancelled in honour of Puerta. On 2 September, Real Madrid managed to win 5–0 against Villarreal at El Madrigal, with two goals from Sneijder, one from Raúl, one from Ruud van Nistelrooy and one from Guti. Real extended their winning streak to three after they beat Almería at home before earning a well-deserved 1–1 draw against Real Valladolid, with Javier Saviola scoring the equalizer three minutes from final time.

Four days later, Real remained unbeaten as they beat Real Betis 2–0 at the Bernabéu, with goals from Raúl and an amazing bicycle kick from Júlio Baptista. Real continued their unbeaten run under Schuster by beating Getafe 0–1 away to ensure Los Blancos remain at the summit of La Liga.

Real began their European campaign well, defeating German side Werder Bremen 2–1 at home thanks to goals from Raúl and Van Nistelrooy and topping their group over Olympiacos, Werder Bremen and Lazio, respectively. However, they lost in the first knockout round against Roma, 4–2 on aggregate.

On 9 December 2008, it was announced Bernd Schuster had been sacked as manager, and that ex-Tottenham Hotspur manager Juande Ramos would replace him. That season ended up being one of the most disastrous in the club's history: Real was knocked out of the Champions League at the round of 16 stage for the fifth time in a row, losing to Liverpool 0–5 on aggregate, crashed out of the Copa del Rey to third tier side Real Unión, and was embarrassed by Barcelona at the Santiago Bernabéu with a humiliating 2–6 loss, which all but confirmed the league title for Barça that went on to win the treble. Madrid then lost their final four league games to cap off the disastrous campaign.

== Second Florentino Pérez era (2009–present) ==
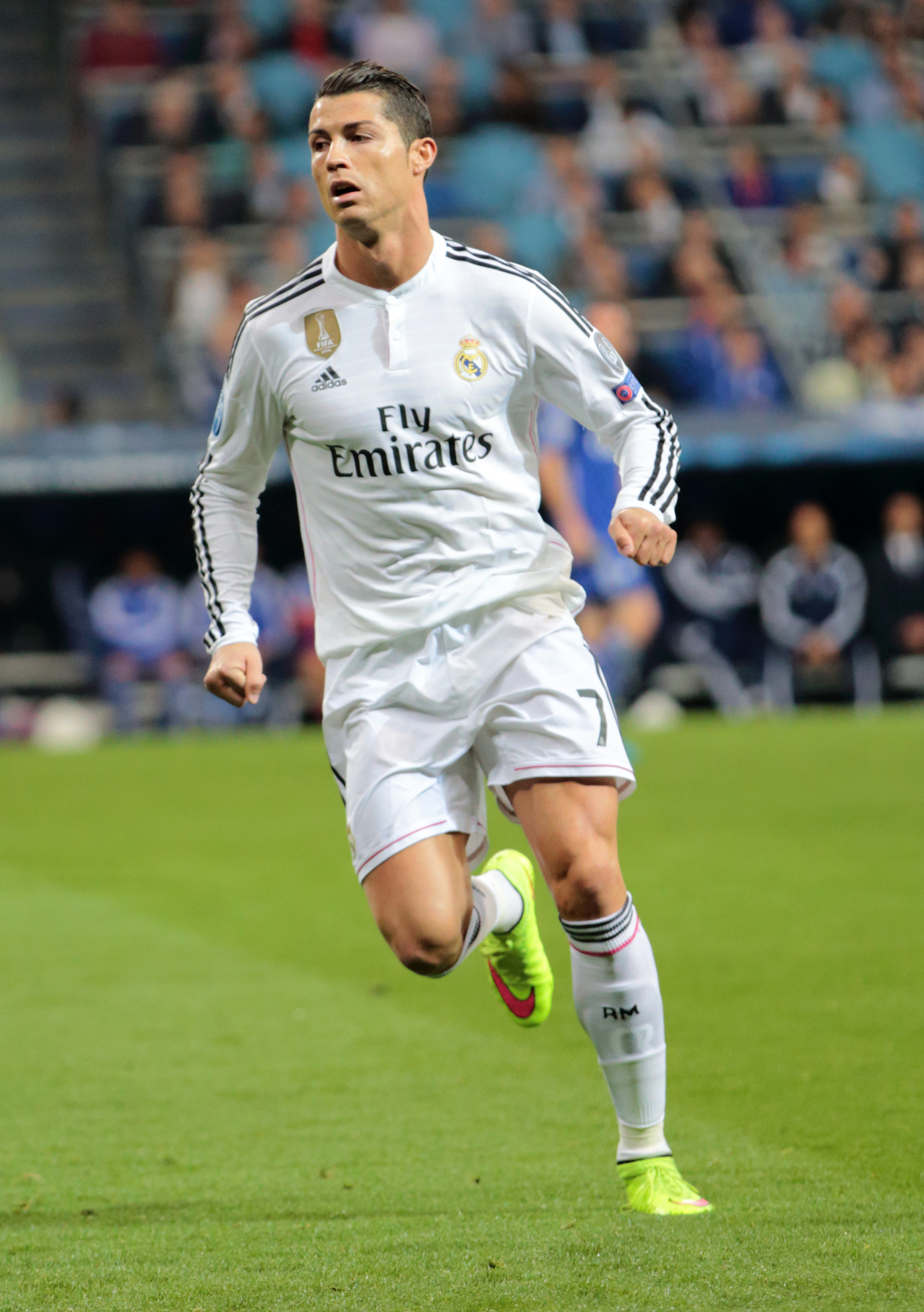
Cristiano Ronaldo was the club's most expensive signing when he joined in 2009, costing €94 million.

On 1 June 2009, Florentino Pérez regained Real Madrid's presidency amid the outrage over the club's decline. Pérez continued with the Galácticos policy pursued in his first term, buying Kaká from Milan for a record-breaking (in pounds sterling) sum of £56 million, and then breaking the record again by purchasing Cristiano Ronaldo from Manchester United for £80 million. The 2009–10 season, however, was a transitional one as Madrid again finished second in the league, although this time amassing 96 points, the club's record at the time, and went out of the Champions League at the hands of Lyon. The season was marred by Cristiano Ronaldo's injury, that sidelined him for seven weeks, although he still topped the goalscoring charts with 33 goals, and Madrid became the highest scoring team in La Liga, with 102 goals. Real Madrid also had the misfortune to become the runners-up with the highest points total in the history of Europe's top five leagues, until surpassed by Liverpool's 97 points in 2018–19.

José Mourinho took over as manager in May 2010. In the 2010–11 season, the rebuilt Madrid successfully fought on all fronts, going toe to toe with a brilliant Barcelona side which some regard as the greatest team in football history. Ultimately, Madrid finished second in the league, with 92 points and four behind their perennial rivals, defeated them in the Copa del Rey final, and lost to Barça in the Champions League semi-finals, where Real progressed to for the first time since 2002–03. Moreover, from 16 April through 3 May, a rare occurrence happened when, for the first time ever, four Clásicos were to be played in a span of just 18 days. The first fixture was in the league campaign on 16 April (which ended 1–1 with penalty goals for both sides), the second one was in the Copa del Rey final (which was won by Madrid 1–0 a.e.t., bringing them their first trophy in the second Galáctico era) on 20 April and the third and fourth ones in the two-legged Champions League semi-finals on 27 April and 3 May (Barcelona won on aggregate with a 2–0 away victory and a 1–1 home draw). The matches in the Champions League proved the most controversial, as multiple refereeing decisions were harshly criticized by Mourinho and Madrid players who accused UEFA of favoring the Catalan side. Namely, Pepe's red card in the 61st minute of the first leg was questioned, after which Barcelona scored two goals, with Mourinho being ejected and subsequently banned for the second leg for protesting, and several controversial offside calls were made, as well as Real having a goal disallowed in the second leg, when the score was tied 0–0. Madrid again became the highest scoring team in La Liga, with 102 goals, repeating its output from the previous season, with Ronaldo scoring 40 and winning the European Golden Shoe.

In the 2011–12 season, Real Madrid won La Liga for a record 32nd time in its history, also finishing the season with numerous league records set, including 100 points amassed in a single season, a total of 121 goals scored, a goal difference of +89, 16 away games won, and 32 wins overall. They also competed in the UEFA Champions League for the 15th successive season, losing in the semi-finals to Bayern Munich on penalties (after a 3–3 aggregate tie) in a heartbreaking fashion. Madrid entered the Copa del Rey as the defending champions, but lost 3–4 on aggregate in the quarter-finals to Barcelona. In the same season, Cristiano Ronaldo became the fastest player to reach 100 goals scored in Spanish league history. In reaching 101 goals in 92 games, Ronaldo surpassed Real Madrid legend Ferenc Puskás, who scored 100 goals in 105 matches. Ronaldo set a new club mark for individual goals scored in one year (60) and became the first player ever to score against all 19 opposition teams in a single season.

Real Madrid started the 2012–13 season by winning the Supercopa de España, defeating Barcelona on away goals. However, the super cup turned out to be their only trophy of the season, despite being close to win them all. Real finished runners-up to Barça in La Liga, accumulating 85 points, and reached the semi-finals of the UEFA Champions League for the third year in a row, where they were eliminated by Borussia Dortmund 3–4 on aggregate. Madrid also entered the Copa del Rey in the round of 32, going on a memorable run to the final, which saw them defeat Barcelona in the semi-finals (including an emphatic 3–1 victory at the Camp Nou) before losing to Atlético Madrid 1–2 a.e.t. in a heartbreaking fashion. Real Madrid faced the Blaugrana six times throughout the season, coming away with three wins, two draws, and one loss. A major transfer of the season was the signing of Luka Modrić from Tottenham Hotspur for a fee in the region of £33 million. After a loss to Atlético in the Copa del Rey final, Pérez announced the departure of José Mourinho at the end of the season by "mutual agreement".

=== La Décima and Champions League three-peat ===

2014 UEFA Champions League Final starting lineup

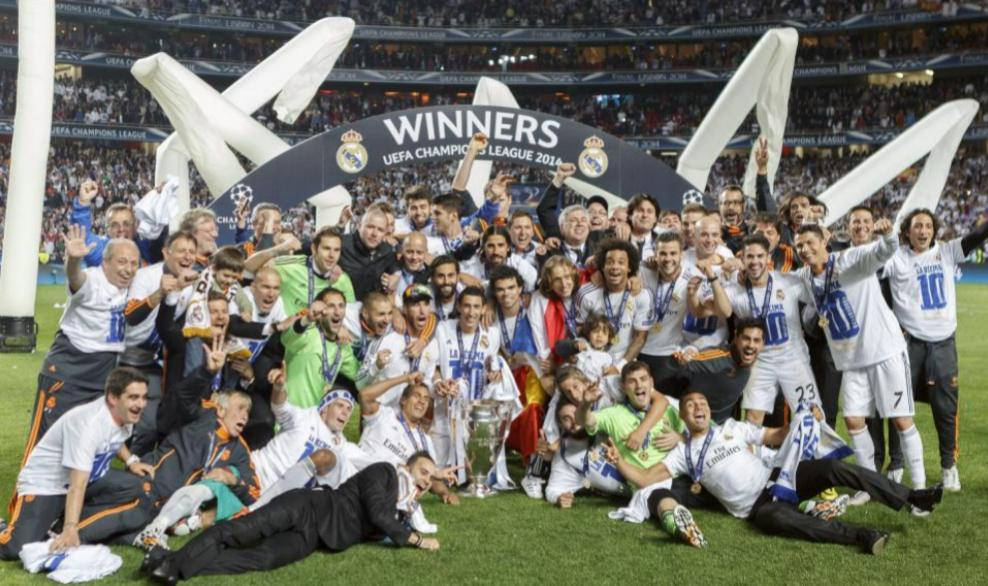
Real Madrid players celebrate the club's historic tenth European Cup / Champions League win (La Décima) in 2014.

On 25 June 2013, Carlo Ancelotti succeeded Mourinho to become the manager of Real Madrid on a three-year deal, with Zinedine Zidane named as one of his assistants. On 1 September 2013, the long-awaited transfer of Gareth Bale from Tottenham Hotspur was announced. The transfer of the Welshman was reportedly a new world record signing, with the transfer price approximated at €100 million. In Ancelotti's first season at the club, Real Madrid fought on all three fronts for the continental treble. Despite leading in the league campaign on multiple occasions, Madrid ultimately finished in third place (level on points with Barcelona and three behind cross-city rivals Atlético Madrid), collecting 87 points in total and scoring a record 104 goals. By that time, Los Blancos had already secured the Copa del Rey – against rivals Barcelona – in April, with Bale scoring the winner. The major breakthrough came in the UEFA Champions League, where Real returned to the final after 12 years, having beaten defending champions Bayern Munich 5–0 on aggregate in the semi-finals. In the final, they defeated then-recently-league winners Atlético Madrid 4–1 a.e.t. to clinch their tenth European Cup (first since 2002) and become the first team to win ten European Cups/Champions League titles, an achievement known as "La Décima". Real's attacking trio of Bale, Benzema and Cristiano, dubbed the BBC, finished the season with 97 goals.

After winning the 2014 Champions League, Real Madrid signed goalkeeper Keylor Navas, midfielder Toni Kroos, and attacking midfielder James Rodríguez. In August, Madrid won the 2014 UEFA Super Cup against Sevilla, the club's 79th official trophy. During the last week of the 2014 summer transfer window, Real Madrid sold two players key to the previous season's successes: Xabi Alonso to Bayern Munich and Ángel Di María to Manchester United. This decision by the club was surrounded by controversy, with Cristiano Ronaldo stating: "If I was in charge, maybe I would have done things differently," while Carlo Ancelotti admitted: "We must start again from zero."

After a slow start to the 2014–15 season, Real Madrid went on a record-breaking 22-match winning streak, which included wins against Barcelona and Liverpool, surpassing the previous Spanish record of 18 successive wins set by Frank Rijkaard's Barça in the 2005–06 season. In late December, Real Madrid won their first Club World Cup, defeating San Lorenzo 2–0 in the final. The winning streak came to an end in their opening match of 2015 with a loss to Valencia, leaving the club two short of equalling the world record of 24 consecutive wins. Madrid was in contention for both the La Liga title and the UEFA Champions League until the very end but ultimately came up short, finishing with 92 points in the league, two behind treble-winning Barcelona and losing to Juventus 2–3 on aggregate in the Champions League semi-finals. Ronaldo finished the season scoring 48 league goals, winning his fourth European Golden Shoe, and 61 goals in all competitions, breaking his record from 2011–12. Overall, despite playing an attractive attacking football and being the highest scoring team in Europe with 118 league goals, several heartbreaking defeats meant that Real finished the season with two trophies out of six possible, which contributed to the dismissal of Carlo Ancelotti on 25 May 2015.

On 3 June 2015, Rafael Benítez was confirmed as the new Real Madrid manager for the 2015–16 season, signing a three-year contract. Real Madrid remained unbeaten in the league until a 3–2 loss at Sevilla on the matchday 11. This was followed by a 0–4 home loss in the first Clásico of the season against Barcelona. Perhaps, his reign is best remembered by multiple lopsided wins achieved both in La Liga and the Champions League (6–0 vs Espanyol, 8–0 vs Malmö, 10–2 vs Rayo Vallecano and others). In the Copa del Rey round of 32, Real accidentally fielded an ineligible player Denis Cheryshev in a 3–1 first leg away win against Cádiz. Cheryshev was suspended from the previous season for three yellow cards (when he was representing a different team) but played the game nonetheless due to an accounting mistake by Madrid officials. Real was disqualified from the 2015–16 Copa del Rey two days later by the competition judge despite protests from president Pérez. In the meantime, Real comfortably topped their UCL group with 16 points and a +16 goal difference. Benítez was relieved of his duties on 4 January 2016 following allegations of unpopularity with supporters, displeasure with players and a failure to get good results against top teams. Benítez's departure was announced along with the promotion of Zinedine Zidane to his first head coaching role. Under Zidane, Madrid managed to turn the odds in its favor, ultimately winning the Champions League, something no one expected. The notable results include a 2–1 away victory over reigning treble winners Barcelona, who were on a record-breaking winning streak, a fantastic comeback against Wolfsburg in the Champions League quarter-finals (after losing the away game 0–2, Madrid erased the deficit and won 3–0 at home, courtesy of a Cristiano Ronaldo hat-trick), as well as a 12-game winning streak to conclude the league campaign, meaning Real finished second, with 90 points and just one point behind champions Barcelona, coming agonizingly close to clinching the title and overcoming a 12-point deficit in the process. Finally, on 28 May, It was the champions league final where Real Madrid face Atetico Madrid. During the game Griezmann's penalty hit the post which ends the game in 1-1 draw and leads the game into penalty shoot-out where Juanfran missed the penalty and from Real Madrid side Ronaldo shoot the winning goal make it 5-3 and lift the eleventh champions league trophy.

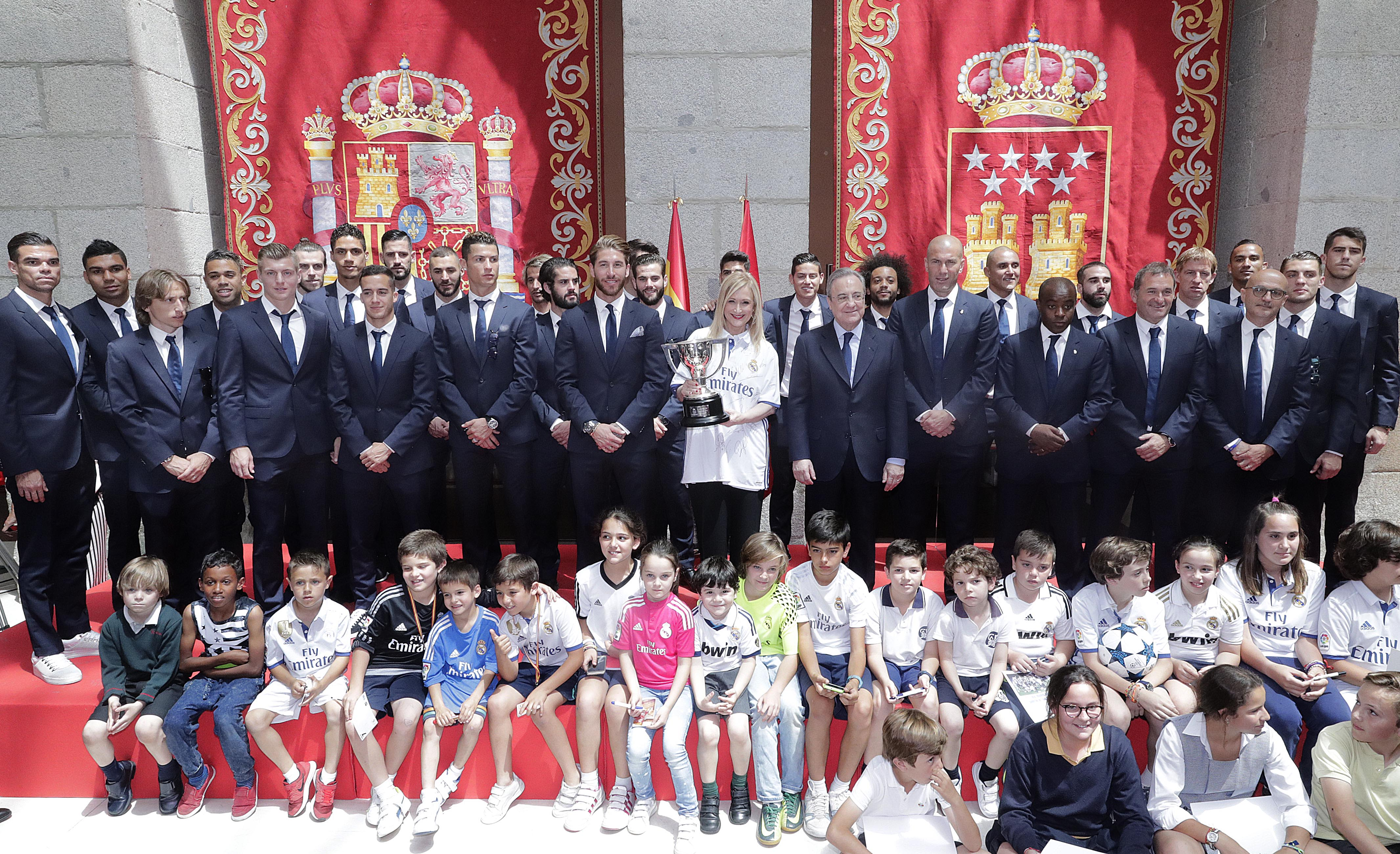
2016–17 La Liga champions Real Madrid celebrate the title with Community of Madrid President Cristina Cifuentes.

Real Madrid began their 2016–17 campaign, which was to be Zidane's first full season in charge of the club, with a victory in the 2016 UEFA Super Cup against Sevilla. On 10 December 2016, Madrid played their 35th-straight match without a loss, which set a new club record. On 18 December 2016, Real Madrid face Japanese club Kashima Antlers in the club world cup final but the game ends in 2-2 draw but in extra-time Real Madrid makes it 4-2 where Ronaldo scored hat-trick and helps Real Madrid to lift the fifth club world cup trophy.. With a 3–3 draw at Sevilla in the second leg of the Copa del Rey round of 16 on 12 January 2017, Madrid progressed to the quarter-finals with a 6–3 aggregate victory and extended its unbeaten run to 40 matches, breaking Barcelona's Spanish record of 39 matches unbeaten in all competitions from the previous season. Their unbeaten streak ended after a 1–2 away loss against the same opposition in La Liga three days later. The team then was knocked out of the Copa del Rey by Celta Vigo 3–4 on aggregate. These slips, however, did not affect the overall trajectory of the season. In May, Madrid won the league title for a record 33rd time, their first title in five years, accumulating 93 points in the process.On 3 June 2017, the defending champion Real Madrid face Juventus in the Final and the Four-times Ballon d'Or winner Ronaldo scored brace which makes 4-1 in full time and helps club to defend their title which was 12 champions league trophy for the club and its third in four years. The achievement is also known as "La Duodécima". The 2016–17 season was the greatest campaign in terms of trophies won (four out of possible five) in the history of Real Madrid, an achievement that would be later equalled in the 2017–18 season.

Real kicked off the 2017–18 campaign by winning its second consecutive and fourth overall UEFA Super Cup in a 2–1 victory against Manchester United. Five days later, Real Madrid beat Barcelona at the Camp Nou 3–1 in the first leg of the 2017 Supercopa de España and then defeated Barça 2–0 in the return leg, ending their 24 consecutive match scoring record in El Clásico matches and winning the second trophy of the season. On 16 December 2017, Real beat Brazilian club Grêmio 1–0 in the FIFA Club World Cup final and became the first team to retain the trophy. On 24 January 2018, Madrid was knocked out of the Copa del Rey at the quarter-final stage by Leganés on away goals. The team's league campaign was also a disappointment as Real collected only 76 points and finished third, 17 points behind champions Barcelona. Madrid fared far better in the Champions League, once again progressing to the final where they defeated Liverpool 3–1 to become the first club to win three straight titles in the Champions League era, as well as the first team to win three consecutive titles in the European Cup/Champions League since Bayern Munich in 1976. The trophy also marked Madrid's fourth win in five years and their eighth consecutive semi-final appearance. On 31 May, only five days after winning the final, Zidane announced his resignation as Real Madrid manager, citing the club's "need for change" as his rationale for departing. Madrid ended the season with four trophies out of possible six.

Zidane's and Ronaldo's departures marked the end of the Second Galáctico Era that yielded four Champions League titles, two La Liga titles, two Copa del Rey, two Supercopa de España, three UEFA Super Cups, and three FIFA Club World Cup titles. The team was instrumental in ending Barcelona's dominance, despite the Blaugrana boasting arguably the greatest collection of talent in history, and overshadowed the Catalans on the European stage. Real Madrid was also somewhat notoriously unlucky in its league campaigns throughout these nine years, finishing runners-up with 96, 92 (twice), and 90 points, as well as on 87 points in third place, just three off the league winners.

=== Following Ronaldo's departure ===
On 12 June, Real Madrid named Julen Lopetegui, the head coach of the Spain national team, as their new manager. It was announced that he would officially begin his managerial duties after the 2018 FIFA World Cup. However, the Spain national team sacked Lopetegui a day prior to the tournament, stating that he had negotiated terms with the club without informing them. The club then began aggressively re-shaping the squad in the summer of 2018, which included the sale of Cristiano Ronaldo to Juventus for a reported €117 million. Madrid began their 2018–19 campaign by losing to Atlético Madrid 2–4 a.e.t. in the 2018 UEFA Super Cup. After a disgraceful 1–5 loss to Barcelona in El Clásico on 28 October which left Real Madrid in the ninth place with only 14 points after 10 games, Lopetegui was dismissed a day later and replaced by then Castilla coach, Santiago Solari. On 22 December 2018, Real Madrid beat Al Ain by a 4–1 margin in the FIFA Club World Cup final. With their win, Real Madrid became the outright record winners of the Club World Cup with four titles. They are considered to have been the world champions for grand total of seven times because FIFA officially recognizes the Intercontinental Cup as the predecessor of the FIFA Club World Cup. They also extended the record for most consecutive titles with their third in a row. Solari won 10 out his first 13 La Liga matches, but the team started to struggle again soon after that. First, they were knocked out of the Copa del Rey at the semi-final stage by Barcelona, losing 0–3 at home on 27 February 2019 after a 1–1 away draw in the first leg. Then there was another El Clásico a few days later, this time in the league, and Madrid against lost a home game to Barça, 0–1. Finally, on 5 March 2019, Real was thumped by Ajax 1–4 (3–5 on aggregate) in a home game, crashing out of the Champions League at the round of 16 stage after eight consecutive semi-finals appearances. On 11 March 2019, Real Madrid dismissed Solari and reinstated Zidane as the head coach of the club. Madrid went on to win five, draw two and lose four remaining league matches under Zidane, finishing third with 68 points, 12 losses and a +17 goal difference, making it Real's worst points total since 2001–02 and worst goal difference since 1999–2000. The club won one out of five possible trophies in one of the most disastrous seasons in its modern history.

The 2019–20 season seemed a promising one, as Madrid went on a spending spree in the summer of 2019, signing Eden Hazard, Luka Jović, Éder Militão, Ferland Mendy, Rodrygo, Reinier and other players for a total of more than €350 million. On 12 January 2020, Madrid beat cross-city rivals Atlético Madrid in a penalty shootout in the Supercopa de España final to win their eleventh title. On 6 February 2020, Madrid was eliminated by Real Sociedad in the Copa del Rey quarter-finals, losing 3–4 at home. After a three-month hiatus due to the COVID-19 outbreak in March 2020, La Liga was restarted in June and Madrid won ten games in a row to capture the team's 34th league title, collecting 87 points in total. Madrid played the postponed second leg of the Champions League round of 16 against Manchester City in August, losing 1–2 (2–4 on aggregate) at the Etihad and being eliminated at the first knockout stage for the second consecutive year. As such, Real ended the season with two trophies out of possible four. From La Liga's resumption in June and until the end of the 2020–21 season, Madrid temporarily played home fixtures at the Alfredo Di Stéfano Stadium, while the Santiago Bernabéu underwent extensive renovations.

=== Further domestic success and La Decimoquinta ===
Zidane left a second time on 27 May 2021 after going trophyless that season, with Carlo Ancelotti returning to coach the team for the 2021–22 season. On the domestic front, he delivered two trophies out of possible three, winning La Liga and the Supercopa de España. As such, Ancelotti won all six available top trophies at Madrid. In the Champions League, Madrid produced one of the most memorable runs of all time, defeating pre-tournament favorites Paris Saint-Germain, defending champions Chelsea, Premier League champions and heavy favorites Manchester City, all in dramatic fashion, and setting up the final against Liverpool, who were once again widely considered as favorites, in a rematch of their 2018 encounter. A lone Vinícius goal sealed the 14th European Cup for Los Blancos, their fifth in nine years, and Ancelotti's second in charge. Real also claimed their fourth ever European double (after 1956–57, 1957–58, and 2016–17). Despite Real Madrid's status as the most decorated team in European Cup / Champions League history, they were considered underdogs in this season's campaign, rated no higher than seventh prior to the start of the group stages in September 2021 (after, in order, Paris Saint-Germain, Manchester City, Bayern Munich, Chelsea, Liverpool, and Manchester United). Prior to the start of the knockout phase in February 2022, they were again seventh, behind Manchester City, Bayern Munich, Liverpool, Chelsea, Paris Saint-Germain, and Ajax, in addition to having been considered underdogs to all of the teams they faced thereafter. As such, Madrid's run can be considered among the most improbable ones in modern Champions League history.

In 2023, Real Madrid wins its 20th Copa del Rey after beating Barcelona 4–0 in the semifinals, and defeating Osasuna 2–1 in the final.

In July 2023, Karim Benzema left Real Madrid to go to Al Ittihad, and Marco Asensio also left Real Madrid, this time going to Paris Saint-Germain. However, Real Madrid signed Jude Bellingham from Borussia Dortmund, who would score 19 goals in his first La Liga season, and winning the Kopa Trophy and the Laureus for his outstanding performance at Real Madrid. They also signed Arda Güler from Fenerbahçe. In October 2023, Eden Hazard retired from football at just 32 years old after having a poor performance on the team, and because he had many injuries that prevented him from playing.

Real Madrid's first title in 2024 was the Spanish Supercup, in which they defeated Atlético de Madrid 5–3 in the semifinals and in the final they beat Barcelona 4–1.

More domestic success would come when they won their 36th league title, having a long run with Girona, who was first on the table for several journeys, but would lose several times while Real Madrid would only lose one game, and being the first Spanish team to qualify for the 2024–25 UEFA Champions League.

In the Champions League, Real Madrid would advance as leader of Group C along with Napoli, Braga and Union Berlin. In the round of 16, they would face RB Leipzig, which they would defeat 2–1 on aggregate, advancing to the quarter finals against Manchester City. They drew the first game 3–3, and in the second leg they beat City in a dramatic 1–1 draw that would lead them to penalties. Finally, Real Madrid would win 4–3 on penalties, facing Bayern Munich at semifinals. They would draw the first match at the Allianz Arena 2–2, and at the Santiago Bernabéu they would turn it in a dramatic fashion around in the last minutes by 2–1 led by a comeback from Joselu. They qualified for the final against Borussia Dortmund at Wembley.

The match kicked off at 20:00 UTC+0 in Wembley, England. At minute 20, Karim Adeyemi has a clear opportunity in front of the goal but was blocked by Carvajal. Just two minutes later, Niclas Füllkrug had another clear opportunity without defense in front of the goal, but the shot went off the post. In the 48th minute, Toni Kroos had a free kick that almost ended in a goal, but Gregor Kobel saves the shot. In the 62nd minute, Dortmund had another chance, a long, curved pass for Füllkrug, but Thibaut Courtois made another save. In the 73rd minute, Real Madrid had a corner taken by Toni Kroos, and Dani Carvajal converted the score to 1–0 with a header. Minute 80, Eduardo Camavinga had a distant opportunity, but again Kobel saved it. Two minutes later, Dortmund makes a serious mistake that Bellingham took advantage of, passing to Vinicius who made it 2–0. With this score, Real Madrid became champions for the 15th time, and Luka Modrić, Dani Carvajal, Nacho and Toni Kroos became the top winners of the Champions League, equalling Paco Gento's record.

This was last Toni Kroos' last game with Real Madrid after he announced his retirement after Euro 2024.Despite their success in the Champions League, several players announced their departures from the team. Among them Nacho, the captain would go to Al Qadsiah, Toni Kroos would retire and Joselu would go to Al Gharafa.

On June 3, one of the most anticipated signings arrived, the signing of Kylian Mbappé to Real Madrid from PSG was made official, he would have a contract for five seasons. His presentation would be on July 16 in the Santiago Bernabéu in front of 80,000 people.

Mbappe's debut and the first match of the 2024–25 season would be against Atalanta in the 2024 UEFA Super Cup, a match that Real Madrid would win 2–0, becoming the top winners of this competition.
