= 1921–22 Real Madrid CF season =

20th season in existence of Real Madrid CF

Real Madrid
1921–22 season
- President: Pedro Parages
- Manager: Juan de Cárcer
- Stadium: Campo de O'Donnell
- Campeonato Regional Centro (Note: The Campeonato Regional Centro (Central Regional Championship) was a regional league used as a qualifier for the Copa del Rey.): 1st
- Copa del Rey: Semifinals
- Top goalscorer: League: Santiago Bernabéu (12); All: Monjardín (19)
- Biggest win: Real Madrid 9–0 Racing de Madrid
- Biggest defeat: Arenas Club de Getxo 4–0 Real Madrid; Real Unión 4–0 Real Madrid
Home colours	Away colours

The 1921–22 season was Real Madrid Club de Fútbol's 20th season in existence. The club played some friendly matches. They also played in the Campeonato Regional Centro (Central Regional Championship) and the Copa del Rey.

== Players ==
Note: Flags indicate national team as defined under FIFA eligibility rules; some limited exceptions apply. Players may hold more than one non-FIFA nationality.

No.	Pos.	Nation	Player
—	GK	(Spain) ESP	Cándido Martínez
—	DF	(Spain) ESP	Pedro Llorente López
—	DF	(Spain) ESP	Patricio Escobal
—	DF	(Spain) ESP	Juan de Manzanedo
—	MF	(Spain) ESP	Ernesto Mejía
—	MF	(Switzerland) SUI	Adolphe Mengotti
—	MF	(Spain) ESP	Antonio Sicilia Mendo
—	MF	(Spain) ESP	Manuel de Meñaca

No.	Pos.	Nation	Player
—	MF	(Spain) ESP	Román Unanue
—	FW	(Spain) ESP	Francisco González Galán
—	FW	(Spain) ESP	Félix Pérez
—	FW	(Spain) ESP	José María Muñagorri
—	FW	(Spain) ESP	Gerónimo del Campo
—	FW	(Spain) ESP	Juan Monjardín
—	FW	(Spain) ESP	Antonio de Miguel
—	FW	(Spain) ESP	José María Úbeda
—	FW	(Spain) ESP	Aurelio Marcos Bartual
—	FW	(Spain) ESP	Santiago Bernabéu

== Friendlies ==
11 September 1921 Friendly	Real Madrid	2–0	Unión SC	Madrid
		Report		Stadium: Campo de O'Donnell

30 September 1921 Friendly	Real Madrid	0–3	Sporting de Gijón	Madrid
		Report		Stadium: Campo de O'Donnell
Note: Real Madrid started the match with 8 players, and additional players joined the match one-by-one. They fielded 11 players for the second half of the match.

2 October 1921 Friendly	Real Madrid	2–3	Sporting de Gijón	Madrid
		Report		Stadium: Campo de O'Donnell

12 October 1921 Friendly	Real Madrid	2–2	Recreativo Español	Madrid
		Report		Stadium: Campo de O'Donnell

16 October 1921 Friendly	Real Madrid	3–4	Recreativo Español	Madrid
		Report		Stadium: Campo de O'Donnell

1 November 1921 Friendly	Real Madrid	2–0	Unión SC	Madrid
		Report		Stadium: Campo de O'Donnell

6 November 1921 Friendly	Real Madrid	6–3	Unión SC	Madrid
		Report		Stadium: Campo de O'Donnell

6 December 1921 Friendly	Real Madrid	6–3	Real Betis	Madrid
		Report		Stadium: Campo de O'Donnell

8 December 1921 Friendly	Real Madrid	8–0	Real Betis	Madrid
		Report		Stadium: Campo de O'Donnell

25 December 1921 Friendly	Sevilla FC	2–4	Real Madrid	Seville
		Report		Stadium: Campo de la Reina Victoria

26 December 1921 Friendly	Sevilla FC	4–0	Real Madrid	Seville
		Report		Stadium: Campo de la Reina Victoria

1 January 1922 Friendly	Real Madrid	2–1	Racing de Santander	Madrid
		Report		Stadium: Campo de O'Donnell

2 January 1922 Friendly	Real Madrid	4–2	Racing de Santander	Madrid
		Report		Stadium: Campo de O'Donnell

4 February 1922 Friendly	Real Madrid	1–5	Sevilla FC	Madrid
		Report		Stadium: Campo de O'Donnell

5 February 1922 Charity match	Real Madrid	3–0	Sevilla FC	Madrid
		Report		Stadium: Campo de O'Donnell
Note: A storm caused the match to be suspended before full time. The match was organised to raise funds for Morocco.

12 February 1922 Friendly	Real Madrid	2–2	Combinado Gimnástico	Madrid
		Report		Stadium: Campo de O'Donnell
Note: Combinado Gimnástico was a team made up of players from RS Gimnástica and Recreativo de Madrid

19 February 1922 Friendly	Real Madrid	4–3	Combinado de Segunda	Madrid
		Report		Stadium: Campo de O'Donnell
Note: Combinado de Segunda was a selection of players from Unión SC, and Recreativo de Madrid. Both teams played in the second division of the Campeonato Regional Centro.

15 March 1922 Friendly	Real Madrid	2–2	FC Barcelona	Madrid
		Report		Stadium: Campo de O'Donnell

14 April 1922 Friendly -3rd Reserve	Real Madrid	1–0	Fomento de Las Artes	Madrid
		Report		Stadium: Campo de O'Donnell
Note: Real Madrid fielded their third team for this match.

5 May 1922 Friendly	Real Madrid (Spain)	1–1	(England) Civil Service F.C.	Madrid, Spain
		Report		Stadium: Campo de O'Donnell

7 May 1922 Friendly	Real Madrid (Spain)	7–4	(England) Civil Service F.C.	Madrid, Spain
		Report		Stadium: Campo de O'Donnell

14 May 1922 Friendly	Real Madrid	0–0	Real Sociedad	Madrid
		Report		Stadium: Campo de O'Donnell

15 May 1922 Friendly	Real Madrid	1–0	Real Sociedad	Madrid
		Report		Stadium: Campo de O'Donnell

30 May 1922 Friendly	Academia de Ingenieros	0–3	Real Madrid	Guadalajara
		Report		Stadium: Campo de Aviación
Note: Academia de Ingenieros was made up of student cadets from the Academy of Military Engineering of Guadalajara.

1 June 1922 Friendly	Real Madrid	0–2	CF Badalona	Madrid
		Report		Stadium: Campo de O'Donnell
Note: The match was halted after 55 minutes due to a rain storm.

30 May 1922 Friendly	RS Gimnástica	2–4	Real Madrid	Madrid
		Report		Stadium: Estadio Torrijos
Note: The match marked the inauguration of Estadio Torrijos.

11 June 1922 Friendly	Sporting de Gijón	4–3	Real Madrid	Gijón
		Report		Stadium: El Molinón

13 June 1922 Friendly	Racing de Santander	3–1	Real Madrid	Santander
		Report		Stadium: Estadio El Sardinero

15 June 1922 Friendly	Racing de Santander	1–3	Real Madrid	Santander
		Report		Stadium: Estadio El Sardinero

18 June 1922 Friendly	Real Sociedad	2–0	Real Madrid	San Sebastián
		Report		Stadium: Atotxa Stadium

20 June 1922 Friendly	Real Sociedad	1–2	Real Madrid	San Sebastián
		Report		Stadium: Atotxa Stadium

25 June 1922 Friendly	Real Madrid (Spain)	4–1	(Portugal) S.L. Benfica	Madrid
		Report		Stadium: Martínez Campos

== Competitions ==
=== Overview ===
Competition	First match	Last match	Starting round	Final position	Record							
Competition	First match	Last match	Starting round	Final position	Pld	W	D	L	GF	GA	GD	Win %
Campeonato Regional Centro	23 October 1921	5 March 1922	Matchday 1	Winners	6	5	1	0	28	5	+23	83.33
Copa del Rey	12 March 1922	11 April 1922	Quarterfinals	Semifinals	8	3	2	3	13	17	−4	37.50
Total					14	8	3	3	41	22	+19	57.14

Source: Competitions

=== Campeonato Regional Centro ===
==== League table ====
Pos	Team	Pld	W	D	L	GF	GA	GD	Pts	Qualification
1	Real Madrid (C, Q)	6	5	1	0	28	5	+23	11	Qualification for the Copa del Rey.
2	Athletic Madrid	6	4	1	1	24	11	+13	9	
3	Racing Madrid	6	1	0	5	10	28	−18	2	
4	RS Gimnástica	6	1	0	5	10	28	−18	2	

Source: Rec.Sport.Soccer Statistics Foundation
Rules for classification: 1) points; 2) goal difference; 3) number of goals scored; 4) head-to-head.
(C) Champions; (Q) Qualified for the phase indicated

==== Matches ====
23 October 1921 1	Real Madrid	1–1	Athletic Madrid	Madrid
	S. Bernabéu ?'	Report	Cosme 1'	Stadium: Campo de O'Donnell; Referee: Juan Durán

13 November 1921 2	RS Gimnástica	0–3	Real Madrid	Madrid
		Report	Monjardín; De Miguel	Stadium: Gimnástica; Referee: Arias

27 November 1921 3	Real Madrid	9–0	Racing de Madrid	Madrid
	P. González; S. Bernabéu; Monjardín; S. Bernabéu; Sicilia; S. Bernabéu; Monjardín	Report		Stadium: Campo de O'Donnell; Referee: Juan Durán

26 February 1922 4	Real Madrid	3–0	RS Gimnástica	Madrid
	S. Bernabéu; Úbeda	Report		Stadium: Campo de O'Donnell; Referee: Juan Durán

3 March 1922 5	Racing de Madrid	2–8	Real Madrid	Madrid
	Caballero (pen.) ?	Report	P. González; S. Bernabéu (pen.),,, Monjardín	Stadium: Martínez Campos; Referee: Sánchez Corona

5 March 1922 6	Athletic Madrid	2–4	Real Madrid	Madrid
	Triana 43'; Pololo ?'	Report	S. Bernabéu 50'; Monjardín 70', 75', 78'	Stadium: Metropolitano; Referee: José Bigador

=== Copa del Rey ===
==== Quarterfinals ====
12 March 1922 First leg	Arenas Club de Getxo	4–0	Real Madrid	Getxo
	Zabalza 9'; Vallana (pen.); Zubiaga; Barturen	Report		Stadium: Ibaondo; Referee: Enrique Peris

19 March 1922 Second leg	Real Madrid	5–2	Arenas Club de Getxo	Madrid
	De Miguel 1'; Mejía 9'; Monjardín 49', 75', 89'	Report	Robus 29', 52'	Stadium: Campo de O'Donnell; Referee: Torrens

21 March 1922 First replay	Real Madrid	1–1 (a.e.t.)	Arenas Club de Getxo	Madrid
	Monjardín 100'	Report	Barturen 119'	Stadium: Campo de O'Donnell; Referee: Ruete

22 March 1922 Second replay	Real Madrid	1–1	Arenas Club de Getxo	Madrid
	Escobal 80'	Report	Ino 40'	Stadium: Martínez Campos; Referee: Peris

29 March 1922 Third replay	Real Madrid	3–0	Arenas Club de Getxo	Madrid
	Monjardín 40', 50', 85'	Report		Stadium: Martínez Campos; Referee: Lemmel

==== Semifinals ====
2 April 1922 First leg	Real Madrid	2–1	Real Unión	Madrid
	Monjardín; Escobal (pen.)	Report	Patricio	Stadium: Campo de O'Donnell; Referee: Lemmel

9 April 1922 Second leg	Real Unión	4–1	Real Madrid	Irun
	Zabala 4', 11'; Azurza 15'; Acosta 24'	Report	González 35'	Stadium: Estadio de Amute; Referee: Vallana

11 April 1922 Replay	Real Unión	4–0	Real Madrid	Irun
		Report		Stadium: Estadio de Amute
