= 1925–26 Real Madrid CF season =

24th season in existence of Real Madrid CF

Real Madrid
1925–26 season
- President: Pedro Parages
- Manager: Juan de Cárcer
- Stadium: Estadio Chamartín
- Campeonato Centro (Note: The Campeonato Regional Centro (Central Regional Championship) was a regional league used as a qualifier for the Copa del Rey.): 1st
- Copa del Rey: Quarter-finals
- Top goalscorer: League: Felix Pérez; Monjardín; Muñagorri (3); All: Monjardín (8)
- Biggest win: Real Madrid 5–1 Racing de Madrid; Real Madrid 6–2 Real Murcia
- Biggest defeat: Real Madrid 1–5 FC Barcelona
Home colours

The 1925–26 season was Real Madrid Club de Fútbol's 24th season in existence. The club played some friendly matches. They also played in the Campeonato Regional Centro (Central Regional Championship) and the Copa del Rey.

== Players ==
Note: Flags indicate national team as defined under FIFA eligibility rules; some limited exceptions apply. Players may hold more than one non-FIFA nationality.

No.	Pos.	Nation	Player
—	GK	ESP	Cándido Martínez
—	GK	SUI	Adolphe Mengotti
—	DF	ESP	Félix Quesada
—	DF	ESP	Guillermo Yllera
—	DF	ESP	Patricio Escobal
—	MF	ESP	Ernesto Mejía
—	MF	ESP	Pedro Helguera

No.	Pos.	Nation	Player
—	MF	ESP	Francisco Cominges
—	FW	ESP	Félix Pérez
—	FW	ESP	Francisco Moraleda
—	FW	ESP	José María Muñagorri
—	FW	ESP	Gerónimo del Campo
—	FW	ESP	Juan Monjardín
—	FW	ESP	Francisco González Galán

== Friendlies ==
19 July 1925 Friendly	Deportivo de La Coruña	3–2	Real Madrid	A Coruña
		Report		Stadium: Estadio Riazor

26 July 1925 Friendly	Deportivo de La Coruña	3–1	Real Madrid	A Coruña
		Report		Stadium: Estadio Riazor

28 July 1925 Friendly	Deportivo de La Coruña	2–1	Real Madrid	A Coruña
		Report		Stadium: Estadio Riazor

15 August 1925 Friendly	Albacete Balompié	2–3	Real Madrid	Albacete
		Report		Stadium: Paseo de la Cuba

16 August 1925 Friendly	Albacete Balompié	1–2	Real Madrid	Albacete
		Report		Stadium: Paseo de la Cuba

31 August 1925 Friendly	Newcastle United (England)	6–1	(Spain) Real Madrid	Newcastle, England
		Report		Stadium: St James' Park

2 September 1925 Friendly	Birmingham City F.C. (England)	3–0	(Spain) Real Madrid	Birmingham, England
		Report		Stadium: St Andrew's

3 September 1925 Friendly	Tottenham Hotspur (England)	4–2	(Spain) Real Madrid	London, England
		Report		Stadium: White Hart Lane

6 September 1925 Friendly	Olympique Lillois (France)	2–3	(Spain) Real Madrid	Lille, France
		Report		Stadium: Stade Victor Boucquey

11 September 1925 Friendly	Staevnet (Denmark)	4–1	(Spain) Real Madrid	Copenhagen, Denmark
				Stadium: Idraetsparken

13 September 1925 Friendly	Staevnet (Denmark)	3–3	(Spain) Real Madrid	Copenhagen, Denmark
		Report		Stadium: Idraetsparken

17 September 1925 Friendly	Red Star F.C. (France)	2–2	(Spain) Real Madrid	Saint-Ouen, France
		Report		Stadium: Stade de Paris

20 September 1925 Friendly	Real Sociedad	1–1	Real Madrid	San Sebastián
		Report		Stadium: Atotxa Stadium

20 September 1925 Friendly	Real Madrid	2–3	Stadium FC	Madrid
		Report		Stadium: Estadio Chamartín

12 October 1925 Friendly	Real Madrid	4–2	Athletic Madrid	Madrid
		Report		Stadium: Estadio Chamartín

25 October 1925 Friendly	Real Madrid	0–3	RS Gimnástica	Madrid
Morning		Report		Stadium: Estadio Chamartín
Note: Real Madrid fielded a line-up that included several reserve team players.

7 December 1925 Friendly	Elche CF	2–2	Real Madrid	Elche
		Report

8 December 1925 Friendly	Elche CF	2–1	Real Madrid	Elche
		Report

26 December 1925 Friendly	Real Murcia	3–1	Real Madrid	Murcia
		Report		Stadium: Estadio de La Condomina

26 December 1925 Friendly	Levante FC	3–1	Real Madrid	Valencia
		Report		Stadium: Estadio La Cruz

27 December 1925 Friendly	Levante FC	1–0	Real Madrid	Valencia
		Report		Stadium: Estadio La Cruz

27 December 1925 Friendly	Real Murcia	1–0	Real Madrid	Murcia
		Report		Stadium: Estadio de La Condomina

1 January 1926 Friendly	Sevilla FC	5–1	Real Madrid	Seville
		Report		Stadium: Campo de la Reina Victoria

4 January 1926 Friendly	Sevilla FC	5–2	Real Madrid	Seville
		Report		Stadium: Campo de la Reina Victoria

6 January 1926 Friendly	Racing de Madrid	3–3	Real Madrid	Madrid
		Report		Stadium: Martínez Campos

24 May 1926 Friendly	Real Madrid	2–1	AD Tranviaria	Madrid
		Report		Stadium: Estadio Chamartín

26 March 1926 Friendly	UD Cartago	3–0	Real Madrid	Cartagena
		Report		Stadium: Paseo Alfonso XIII

1 May 1926 Friendly	Valencia CF	4–3	Real Madrid	Valencia
		Report		Stadium: Mestalla

2 May 1926 Friendly	Valencia CF	0–0	Real Madrid	Valencia
		Report		Stadium: Mestalla

15 May 1926 Friendly	Real Madrid	0–2	Gràcia FC	Madrid
		Report		Stadium: Estadio Chamartín

16 May 1926 Friendly	Real Madrid	1–3	Gràcia FC	Madrid
		Report		Stadium: Estadio Chamartín

27 June 1926 Friendly	Español de Cádiz	3–0	Real Madrid	Cádiz
		Report
Note: Real Madrid were missing several players who had traveled with RCD Espanyol on their American tour.

29 June 1926 Friendly	Español de Cádiz	8–0	Real Madrid	Cádiz
		Report
Note: Real Madrid were missing several players who had traveled with RCD Espanyol on their American tour.

25 July 1926 Friendly	Deportivo de La Coruña	7–3	Real Madrid	A Coruña
		Report		Stadium: Estadio Riazor

== Competitions ==
=== Overview ===
Competition	First match	Last match	Starting round	Final position	Record							
Competition	First match	Last match	Starting round	Final position	Pld	W	D	L	GF	GA	GD	Win %
Campeonato Regional Centro	11 October 1925	21 February 1926	Matchday 1	Winners	8	6	1	1	17	5	+12	75.00
Copa del Rey	7 March 1926	25 April 1926	Group stage	Quarterfinals	6	3	0	3	12	14	−2	50.00
Total					14	9	1	4	29	19	+10	64.29

Source: Competitions

=== Campeonato Regional Centro ===
==== League table ====
Pos	Team	Pld	W	D	L	GF	GA	GD	Pts	Qualification
1	Real Madrid (C, Q)	8	6	1	1	17	5	+12	13	Qualification for the Copa del Rey.
2	Athletic Madrid (Q)	8	5	0	3	22	11	+11	10	Qualification for the Copa del Rey.
3	RS Gimnástica	8	4	1	3	21	20	+1	9	
4	Racing Madrid	8	3	1	4	17	19	−2	7	
5	Unión SC (O)	8	0	1	7	5	27	−22	1	Qualification for the relegation play-offs

Source: Rec.Sport.Soccer Statistics Foundation
Rules for classification: 1) points; 2) goal difference; 3) number of goals scored.
(C) Champions; (O) Play-off winners; (Q) Qualified for the phase indicated

==== Matches ====
11 October 1925 1	Racing de Madrid	0–0	Real Madrid	Madrid
		Report		Stadium: Racing; Referee: Ezcurdia

1 November 1925 2	Real Madrid	2–0	Athletic Madrid	Madrid
	Del Campo 19'; Muñagorri 71'	Report		Stadium: Estadio Chamartín; Referee: Lloveras

22 November 1925 3	Unión SC	0–3	Real Madrid	Madrid
		Report	P. González; Felix Pérez; Moraleda	Stadium: Unión; Referee: Lloveras

6 December 1925 4	Real Madrid	2–3	RS Gimnástica	Madrid
	Quesada (pen.); Moraleda	Report	Goiburu 25' (pen.), L. Uribe	Stadium: Estadio Chamartín; Referee: Ezcurdia

20 December 1925 5	Real Madrid	5–1	Racing de Madrid	Madrid
	Felix Pérez 2'; Moraleda 25'; Monjardín; Felix Pérez; Del Campo	Report	Caballero 15'	Stadium: Estadio Chamartín; Referee: Saracho

17 January 1926 6	Athletic Madrid	0–1	Real Madrid	Madrid
		Report	Muñagorri 72'	Stadium: Estadio Metropolitano; Referee: Vilalta

7 February 1926 7	Real Madrid	2–0	Unión SC	Madrid
	Monjardín 25', 65'	Report		Stadium: Union; Referee: Lloveras

21 February 1926 8	RS Gimnástica	1–2	Real Madrid	Madrid
	Iribarren	Report	Monjardín; Muñagorri	Stadium: Estadio Metropolitano; Referee: Vilalta

=== Copa del Rey ===
==== Group stage ====
Pos	Team	Pld	W	D	L	GF	GA	GD	Pts	Qualification
1	Real Madrid (Q)	4	3	0	1	11	6	+5	6	Advance to knockout phase
2	Sevilla FC	4	2	1	1	8	5	+3	5	
3	Real Murcia	4	0	1	3	5	13	−8	1	

Source: Leyenda Blanca
Rules for classification: 1) points; 2) tiebreaker match
(Q) Qualified for the phase indicated

7 March 1926 1	Real Madrid	6–2	Real Murcia	Madrid
	Monjardín 18', 35', 37', Muñagorri 58'; Moraleda 89'	Report	Castro; Campins	Stadium: Estadio Chamartín; Referee: Castillo

14 March 1926 2	Sevilla FC	0–1	Real Madrid	Seville
		Report	Félix Pérez 68'	Stadium: Campo de la Reina Victoria; Referee: Serrano

28 March 1926 3	Real Murcia	1–2	Real Madrid	Murcia
	Marcos (pen.)	Report	Muñagorri; Félix Pérez	Stadium: Estadio de La Condomina; Referee: Serrano

4 April 1926 4	Real Madrid	2–3	Sevilla FC	Madrid
	Félix Pérez 39', 82'	Report	Rey 6', 63'; Brand 25'	Stadium: Estadio Chamartín; Referee: Vela

==== Quarterfinals ====
18 April 1926 First leg	Real Madrid	1–5	FC Barcelona	Madrid
	Monjardín 47'	Report	Samitier 19', 26', 43' ? Piera 79'	Stadium: Estadio Chamartín; Referee: Calderón

25 April 1926 Second leg	FC Barcelona	3–0	Real Madrid	Barcelona
		Report		Stadium: Les Corts; Referee: Steiborn
