= 1919–20 Madrid FC season =

18th season in existence of Real Madrid CF

Madrid FC
1919–20 season
- President: Pedro Parages
- Manager: Arthur Johnson
- Stadium: Campo de O'Donnell
- Campeonato Regional Centro (Note: The Campeonato Regional Centro (Central Regional Championship) was a regional league used as a qualifier for the Copa del Rey.): 1st
- Copa del Rey: Quarterfinals
- Top goalscorer: League: P. González (6); All: P. González (7)
- Biggest win: Madrid FC 5–0 RS Gimnástica
- Biggest defeat: Athletic Bilbao 4–1 Madrid FC
Home colours	Away colours

The 1919–20 season was Madrid Football Club's 18th season in existence. The club played some friendly matches. They also played in the Campeonato Regional Centro (Central Regional Championship) and the Copa del Rey.

== Players ==
Note: Flags indicate national team as defined under FIFA eligibility rules; some limited exceptions apply. Players may hold more than one non-FIFA nationality.

No.	Pos.	Nation	Player
—	GK	ESP	Pablo Hernández Coronado
—	GK	ESP	Javier Barroso
—	DF	ESP	Juan de Manzanedo
—	DF	ESP	Pedro Llorente López
—	MF	ESP	José María Castell
—	MF	ESP	Manuel Cominges Tapias
—	MF	SUI	Adolphe Mengotti
—	MF	ESP	Antonio Sicilia Mendo

No.	Pos.	Nation	Player
—	FW	ESP	Francisco González Galán
—	FW	ESP	José María Muñagorri
—	FW	ESP	Juan Monjardín
—	FW	ESP	Antonio de Miguel
—	FW	ESP	Victoriano Rodríguez
—	FW	ESP	José María Sansinenea
—	FW	ESP	Santiago Bernabéu

== Friendlies ==
6 July 1919 Friendly	Real Vigo Sporting	3–0	Madrid	Vigo
	Fernando (?); Moncho (?)	Report		Stadium: Campo de Coia

8 July 1919 Friendly	Fortuna Vigo	2–3	Madrid	Vigo
	Herminio (?) /Torrado (?)	Report	González (?) /Guzmán (?); Bernabéu (?)	Stadium: Campo de Bouzas

11 July 1919 Friendly	Real Vigo Sporting	4–0	Madrid	Vigo
	Dimas (?); Álvarez (?)	Report		Stadium: Campo de Coia

13 July 1919 Friendly	Fortuna Vigo	1–2	Madrid	Vigo
	Torrado (?)	Report	Guzmán (?); Ruiz (?)	Stadium: Campo de Bouzas; Referee: Arturo López

14 July 1919 Friendly	Real Unión Orense	0–4	Madrid	Ourense
		Report	Bernabéu (?); González (?)	Stadium: Loña

18 July 1919 Friendly	Deportivo La Coruña	2–1	Madrid	A Coruña
	Ramón (?); Villamando (?)	Report	? (?)	Stadium: Monelos; Referee: Julián López

20 July 1919 Friendly	Deportivo La Coruña	1–2	Madrid	A Coruña
	Torres (?)	Report	Bernabéu (?), 50'	Stadium: Monelos; Referee: Arambillet

21 September 1919 Friendly	Madrid	0–4	Athletic Madrid	Madrid
		Report		Stadium: Campo de O'Donnell

3 October 1919 Friendly	Madrid (Spain)	4–1	(Portugal) Benfica	Madrid, Spain
	González (?); Mieg (?); Víctor (?); Sansinenea (?)	Report	Gonçalves (?)	Stadium: Campo de O'Donnell; Referee: Larrañaga

7 October 1919 Friendly	Madrid (Spain)	1–5	(Portugal) Benfica	Madrid, Spain
		Report		Stadium: Campo de O'Donnell

19 October 1919 Friendly	Madrid	3–2	Athletic Madrid	Madrid
	Víctor 46', 85'; Sansinesea 50'	Report	Pololo (?)	Stadium: Campo de O'Donnell; Referee: Larrañaga

26 October 1919 Friendly	Madrid	2–2	Sporting Gijón	Madrid
	Sansinesea (?)	Report	Villaverde (?)	Stadium: Campo de O'Donnell; Referee: Bertrán

1 November 1919 Friendly	Madrid	1–1	Athletic Madrid	Madrid
	Sansinesea (?)	Report	? (?)	Stadium: Campo de O'Donnell

2 November 1919 Friendly	RS Gimnástica	1–3	Madrid	Madrid
	? (?)	Report	Víctor (?) ? (?)	Stadium: Princesa; Referee: Del Vigo

23 November 1919 Friendly	Sevilla	5–1	Madrid	Seville
	Armet (?); Spencer (?); Otero (?)	Report	Bernabéu (?)	Stadium: Campo de la Reina Victoria; Referee: Alba

25 November 1919 Friendly	Sevilla	3–2	Madrid	Seville
	Spencer (?); Armet (?)	Report	De Miguel (?); Sansinesea (?)	Stadium: Campo de la Reina Victoria; Referee: Ramos

7 December 1919 Friendly	Madrid	5–1	Racing Santander	Madrid
	Bernabéu (?); González (?)	Report	Barbosa (?)	Stadium: Campo de O'Donnell; Referee: Bertrán

25 December 1919 Friendly	Madrid (Spain)	4–1	(Switzerland) La Chaux-de-Fonds	Madrid, Spain
	Sansinenea (?); Víctor (?); González (?)	Report	Frantz (?)	Stadium: Campo de O'Donnell; Referee: Bertrán

1 January 1920 Friendly	Madrid (Spain)	0–4	(Netherlands) Breda	Madrid, Spain
		Report	Petit 40' (?); Sillehens (?); Wolf (?)	Stadium: Campo de O'Donnell; Referee: Larrañaga

4 January 1920 Friendly	Madrid	9–2	Athletic Madrid	Madrid
	Armet (?); Bernabéu (?); Mengotti (?); Muñagorri (?)	Report	Arroyo (?); Fajardo (?)	Stadium: Campo de O'Donnell; Referee: Ruete

6 January 1920 Friendly	Madrid	2–2	Combinado de Segunda	Madrid
	Muñagorri (?); Bernabéu (?)	Report	Zugázaga (?); Trueba (?)	Stadium: Campo de O'Donnell; Referee: Pastor
Note: Combinado de Segunda was a selection of players from the teams of the second category of the Campeonato Regional Centro.

1 February 1920 Friendly	Madrid	1–3	Athletic Madrid	Madrid
	? (?)	Report	Pololo (?); Fajardo (?) ? (?)	Stadium: Campo de O'Donnell

15 February 1920 Friendly	Barcelona	2–2	Madrid	Barcelona
	Alcántara (?); Sancho (?)	Report	Mieg (?)	Stadium: Camp de la Indústria

18 February 1920 Friendly	Barcelona	7–1	Madrid	Barcelona
	Alcántara (?); Vinyals (?); Sancho (?); Plaza (?); Lakatos (?)	Report	Mieg (?)	Stadium: Camp de la Indústria; Referee: Peris

7 March 1920 Friendly	Madrid	1–4	Athletic Madrid	Madrid
		Report		Stadium: Campo de O'Donnell

19 March 1920 Friendly	Athletic Madrid	2–2	Madrid	Madrid
	Triana (?)	Report	Víctor (?); Bernabéu (?)	Stadium: Campo de O'Donnell (Atlético); Referee: Bertrán

21 March 1920 Friendly	Madrid	2–3	Athletic Madrid	Madrid
	Víctor (?); Tovar (?)	Report	Del Río (?); Pololo (?)	Stadium: Campo de O'Donnell; Referee: Larrañaga

25 March 1920 Friendly	Madrid	0–1	Athletic Madrid	Madrid
		Report	Del Río (?)	Stadium: Campo de O'Donnell
Note: Match to raise funds for the benefit of the Federation Athletics Center.

2 May 1920 Friendly	Madrid	1–3	Sabadell	Madrid
	? (?)	Report	Tovar (?) ? (?) ? (?)	Stadium: Campo de O'Donnell

3 June 1920 Friendly	Madrid	3–5	Combinado Militar	Madrid
	Víctor (?); Sansinesea (?)	Report	Matías (?) ? (?) ? (?) ? (?) ? (?)	Stadium: Campo de O'Donnell; Referee: Bertrán
Note: Combinado Militar was made up of players from the Regiments of Sicily and Murcia, who were finalists of the military championship. The match was organised to raise funds for the Federación Regional Centro.

== Competitions ==
=== Overview ===
Competition	First match	Last match	Starting round	Final position	Record							
Competition	First match	Last match	Starting round	Final position	Pld	W	D	L	GF	GA	GD	Win %
Campeonato Regional Centro	30 November 1919	20 March 1920	Matchday 1	Winners	6	4	1	1	17	7	+10	66.67
Copa del Rey	28 March 1920	4 April 1920	Quarterfinals	Quarterfinals	2	0	1	1	5	2	+3	0.00
Total					8	4	2	2	22	9	+13	50.00

Source: Competitions

=== Campeonato Regional Centro ===
==== League table ====
Pos	Team	Pld	W	D	L	GF	GA	GD	Pts	Qualification
1	Madrid (C, Q)	6	4	1	1	17	7	+10	9	Qualification for the Copa del Rey.
2	Athletic Madrid	6	3	2	1	16	11	+5	8	
3	Racing Madrid	6	2	3	1	16	7	+9	7	
4	RS Gimnástica	6	0	0	6	3	27	−24	0	

Source: Rec.Sport.Soccer Statistics Foundation
Rules for classification: 1) points; 2) goal difference; 3) number of goals scored.
(C) Champions; (Q) Qualified for the phase indicated

==== Matches ====
30 November 1919 1	Madrid	5–0	RS Gimnástica	Madrid
	González (?); Victor (?)	Report		Stadium: Campo de O'Donnell; Referee: Larrañaga

21 December 1919 2	Athletic Madrid	1–3	Madrid	Madrid
	Sáez 44'	Report	González 10'; Sansinesea (?); Víctor (?)	Stadium: Campo de Vallecas; Referee: Montero

11 January 1920 3	Madrid	1–1	Racing Madrid	Madrid
	Bernabéu (?)	Report	Peris (?)	Stadium: Campo de O'Donnell; Referee: Larrañaga

25 January 1920 4	RS Gimnástica	1–4	Madrid	Madrid
	Burgaleta (?)	Report	Sansinesea (?); De Miguel (?); González (?)	Stadium: Gimnástica; Referee: Montero

22 February 1920 5	Madrid	2–3	Athletic Madrid	Madrid
	Tovar (?); Sansinesea (?)	Report	Triana (?); Olaso (?)	Stadium: Campo de O'Donnell; Referee: Larrañaga

20 March 1920 6	Racing Madrid	1–2	Madrid	Madrid
	Caballero 80' (pen.)	Report	Víctor (?); Muñagorri (?)	Stadium: Martínez Campos; Referee: Manuel Lemmel

=== Copa del Rey ===
==== Quarterfinals ====
28 March 1920 First leg	Madrid	1–1	Athletic Bilbao	Madrid
	Monjardín 45'	Report	Belauste 10'	Stadium: Estadio O'Donnell; Referee: Francisco Bru

4 April 1920 Second leg	Athletic Bilbao	4–1	Madrid	Bilbao
	Laca 7' (pen.); Germán (?)	Report	González (?)	Stadium: Estadio San Mamés; Referee: Torrens
