= El Solar de Estrada =

Football pitch in Madrid, Spain

- Location: Madrid, Spain

Construction
- Opened: 1900

Tenant
- Real Madrid (1900)

The Solar de Estrada, also known as Campo de Estrada, was a piece of land used as a football pitch by Madrid FC in its early years in 1900. It is best known for being regarded as the first settlement in the beginnings of Madrid FC, who were not even an official club at that time, playing several friendly games on this field before moving to Tiro del Pichón and Campo de Jorge Juan.

It was one of the fields that the club had at its inception, a period in which it was not yet duly legalized and in which the various existing clubs in the capital wandered from one field to another because there was not a proper venue for its practice. The venue took the name of its owner, Claudio Estrada, who was one of the members of the club, a marble worker, and father-in-law of the very first (unofficial) president of the club, Julián Palacios.

== History ==
The field was a now-extinct piece of land next to the old Convento de la Concepción Jerónima, in which players who had left New Foot-Ball Club played numerous games in addition to those held in the fields of Moncloa and Tiro del Pichón, before officially becoming Madrid FC on 6 March 1902. The marble mason industry of Salamanca was located in the area at the time and the workshops dedicated to the practice were frequent, and one of those workshops was owned by Claudio Estrada, a well-known businessman of the time and the father-in-law of Julián Palacios, who had led the split of New FC and created Madrid FC, and he convinced Estrada to give him permission to use the piece of land next to his workshop in the leveled area of Velázquez street in order to carry out their sporting practices on a provisional basis due to the accelerated split of Sky FC, thus becoming the club’s first playing field. It was also there that Palacios met the one who shortly after became his wife: a daughter of Estrada. Interestingly, another founder of this Madrid FC, Ángel Barquín, also married the daughter of another famous marble player of the time, Faustino Nícoli, who later became the first deputy mayor of the Madrid municipality.

== Lay out ==
The land, as was customary at the time, was unfenced, and the playing field was smoothed by the players themselves, who arrived early to paint the lines of the field and carry the goals on their shoulders, which they had to fix on the ground to be able to play their matches.

== Decline and Collapse ==
In 1903, Madrid FC moved to the esplanade next to the Goya bullring (now the Palacio de Deportes), a piece of land that is now the Campo de Jorge Juan.
