= 1928–29 Campeonato Regional Centro =

Season of Spanish football league

The 1928–29 Campeonato Regional de Madrid was the 27th season of the Campeonato Regional Centro. Real Madrid, Athletic de Madrid and Racing de Madrid finished in the top three positions respectively and qualified for the 1928–29 Copa del Rey.

== Primera Categoría ==
Pos	Team	Pld	W	D	L	GF	GA	GD	Pts	Qualification
1	Real Madrid (C, Q)	8	7	1	0	30	8	+22	15	Qualification for the Copa del Rey.
2	Athletic Madrid (Q)	8	6	0	2	23	14	+9	12	Qualification for the Copa del Rey.
3	Racing Madrid (Q)	8	2	1	5	13	18	−5	5	Qualification for the Copa del Rey.
4	Nacional Madrid	8	2	0	6	16	25	−9	4	Qualification for the relegation play-offs
5	Unión SC	8	2	0	6	17	34	−17	4	Qualification for the relegation play-offs

Source: Rec.Sport.Soccer Statistics Foundation
Rules for classification: 1) points; 2) goal difference; 3) number of goals scored.
(C) Champions; (Q) Qualified for the phase indicated

== Segunda Categoría Preferente ==
Pos	Team	Pld	W	D	L	GF	GA	Pts	
1	RSG Española	8	7	1	0	24	5	15	Torneo de Promoción
2	Primitiva Amistad de Madrid	8	5	1	2	21	8	11	Torneo de Promoción
3	Imperio FC de Madrid	8	4	0	4	13	15	8	
4	AD Ferroviaria	8	3	0	5	11	13	6	
5	Arenas Sporting Club de Madrid	8	0	0	8	2	30	0	

== Segunda Categoría ==
Pos	Team	Pld	W	D	L	GF	GA	Pts	
1	AD Tranviaria	8	7	0	1	19	7	10	Torneo de Promoción
2	SR El Cafeto	7	3	1	3	10	14	7	
3	UD Explosivos	7	3	1	3	11	16	7	
4	SD Hogar Vasco	8	3	0	5	15	14	6	
5	RSD Aranjuez	8	2	0	6	10	14	4	

== Torneo de Promoción ==
Pos	Team	Pld	W	D	L	GF	GA	Pts
1	Unión Sporting Club	8	7	0	1	15	6	14
2	CD Nacional	8	4	1	3	10	8	9
3	Primitiva Amistad	8	4	0	4	11	14	8
4	AD Tranviaria	8	2	2	4	6	15	6
5	RSG Española (Withdraw)							

Unión Sporting and Nacional retaining their spot for the 1929–30 season.
