= Campo de Jorge Juan =

Former stadium in Madrid, Spain

Campo de Jorge Juan / Explanada de la Plaza de Toros
- Full name: Campo de Jorge Juan
- Location: Madrid, Spain
- Capacity: 1,000

Construction
- Opened: 1902
- Closed: 1912
- Demolished: 1912

Tenant
- Real Madrid C.F. (1902–1912)

Campo de Jorge Juan or Explanada de la Plaza de Toros was the Real Madrid home stadium between 1902 and 1912, after the foundation of the club on 6 March 1902. Before becoming a club, the players of Real Madrid used another field from that part of the city, called Tiro del Pichón, next to the Buen Retiro Park. After moving on this new place, Tiro del Pichón became the main stadium of Atlético Madrid.

The first match in the history of Real Madrid Football Club was played there on 9 March 1902, between two teams with members of the Real Madrid club (Madrid Football Club "B" won, 6–0, against Madrid Football Club "A"). On the same day another match was organised, with two teams more balanced, Madrid Football Club "A" won, 1–0, against Madrid Football Club "B".

Famous players who played in that early first game were Juan Padrós, Julián Palacios, and Adolfo Meléndez.

The first match against another club was played on 2 May 1902 against New Football Club de Madrid, the game ended in a 1–1 draw, and it was played on Estadio del Hipódromo, for a bigger attendance.
