= Campo de la Reina Victoria =

Multi-use stadium in Seville, Spain

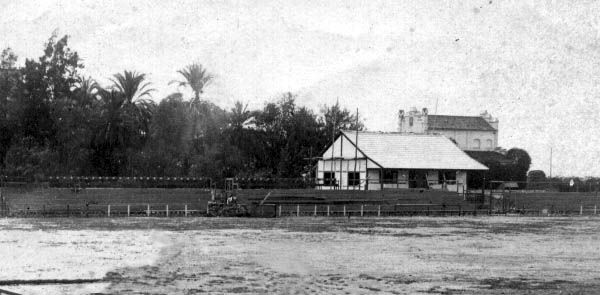
- Full name: Campo de la Reina Victoria
- Owner: Sevilla FC
- Capacity: 12,000
- Surface: Grass

Construction
- Opened: 1918
- Closed: 1928; 98 years ago

Tenant
- Sevilla FC (1918–28)

The Campo de la Reina Victoria was a multi-use stadium in Seville, Spain. It was used mostly for association football matches and hosted the home games of Sevilla FC. The stadium, opened in 1918, was the venue of Sevilla for 10 years until the club moved to Estadio de Nervión.

== Overview ==
In 1918, an urbanization project carried out by the Seville City Council on Prado de San Sebastián to host the "Exposición Iberoamericana", Sevilla FC and other clubs in Seville had to leave their fields. The club searched for a new field so some executives visited the mayor and asked him for a vacant land that could be used as a field for the team. As the negotiations were not successful, the club was in the search of other locations, finding one on the Avenida de la Reina Victoria (current Avenida de la Palmera).

The field was inaugurated on October 21, 1918 on a land rented to the Marchioness of Esquivel María Caravajal Hurtado. The land was located in a ranch on Paseo de la Palmera. The rent price was set at Spanish peseta 2,000 per year, a low price for then. The facilities were designed by architect Pablo Gutiérrez. The stadium was inaugurated in a match between Sevilla and Unión Sporting Club of Madrid. In 1924 two grandstands were added to the stadium, expanding its capacity to 12,000.

In 1923, Campo de la Reina Victoria hosted the first match of the Spain national football team in Andalucía, a 3–0 win v Portugal. The venue also hosted the 1925 Copa del Rey Final when FC Barcelona won their sixth title after beating Arenas Club de Getxo 2–0 in the decisive match.
