= Paco González (footballer, born 1897) =

Spanish footballer

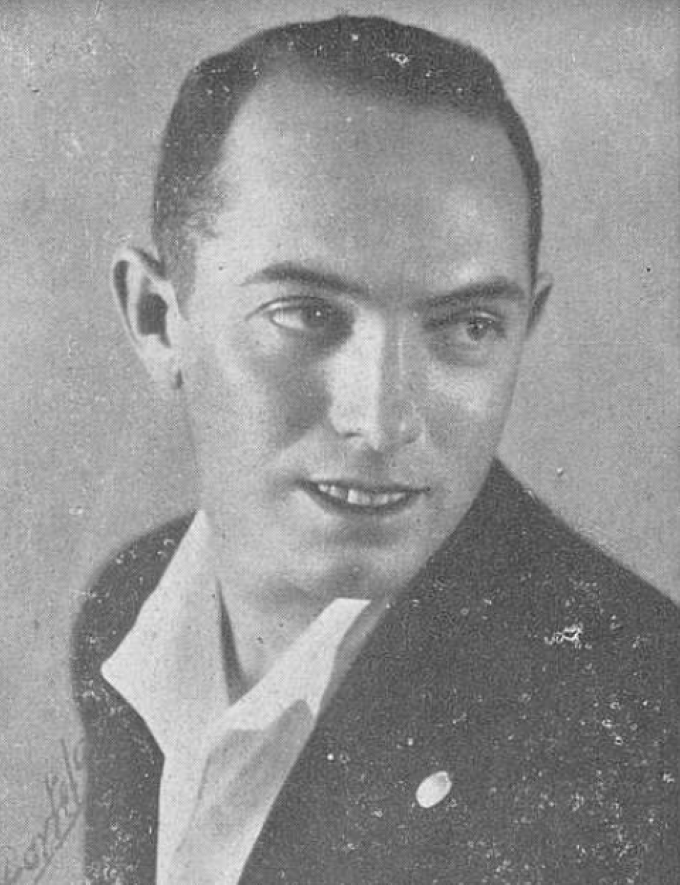
- González in 1926

Personal information
- Full name: Francisco González Galán
- Date of birth: 14 February 1897
- Place of birth: A Coruña, Galicia, Spain
- Date of death: 9 February 1976 (aged 78)
- Place of death: A Coruña, Galicia, Spain
- Position: Forward

Youth career
- Celita
- Arvida

Senior career*
Years	Team	Apps	(Gls)
1913–1914	Real Club Coruña		
1914–1919	Deportivo de La Coruña		
1919–1922	Real Madrid		
1922–1924	Espanyol		
1924–1925	Elche		
1925–1926	Real Madrid		
1926–1927	Gimnástica de Torrelavega		
1929	Deportivo de La Coruña	1	(0)

International career
1920	Probables	2	(1)

Managerial career
- 1924–1925: Elche
- 1926–1929: Gimnástica de Torrelavega
- 1929–1930: Deportivo de La Coruña
- 1931–1933: Nacional de Madrid
- 1933–1934: Elche
- 1934–1935: Real Zaragoza
- 1935–1936: Racing de Santander
- 1940–1941: Compostela Sporting
- 1943–1944: Salamanca
- 1944–1945: Eldense
- 1945–1946: Compostela FC
- 1946–1947: Club Santiago
- * Club domestic league appearances and goals

Francisco González Galán (14 February 1897 – 9 February 1976), also known as Paco González , was a Spanish footballer who played as a forward for Real Madrid, and Espanyol in the 1920s.

He later worked as a manager, taking charge of Deportivo de La Coruña and Real Zaragoza.

== Playing career ==
=== Early career ===
Born in A Coruña on 14 February 1897, González began his football career in the youth ranks of his hometown teams Celita and Arvida, from where he moved to Real Club Coruña in 1913. In the following year, he signed for Deportivo de La Coruña, with whom he played for five years, until 1919, when he was sent to Madrid to carry out his mandatory military service in the El Pardo battalion, where he quickly became the captain of the Telegraph Regiment team in the Central Region Military Championship.

=== Real Madrid ===
Shortly after arriving in the Spanish capital in 1919, González signed for Real Madrid, with whom he scored a total of 11 goals in 23 official matches between 1919 and 1922, thus helping his side win two regional championship in 1920 and 1922. During this first spell at Madrid, he played alongside the future president of the club Santiago Bernabéu, with whom he formed a sincere friendship.

After completing his military service, González went to Barcelona, where he signed for Espanyol as a secret professional with a monthly salary of 1,000 pesetas. There, he played alongside the historic goalkeeper Ricardo Zamora, with whom he forged a great friendship. In August 1923, he was the subject of a tribute match from Deportivo de la Coruña. He remained loyal to Espanyol for two seasons, scoring a total of 1 goal in 10 official matches, all in the Catalan championship. He left the club in April 1924, after accepting an offer from the newly founded Elche to become their head coach (hence working as a player-coach), signing for 1,500 pesetas a month and a testimonial match, with his subsequent arrival at Elche being a major event. Two months later, in June 1924, he and his friend Zamora played two friendly matches against Madrid, helping their side to a 1–1 draw in the latter.

In January 1925, González returned to his hometown after receiving a call from Deportivo to replace Ramón González, who had traveled to Seville to represent the Galician national team in the semifinals of the 1922–23 Prince of Asturias Cup. However, he was only able to play two matches for Deportivo, as in the second, a derby against Celta de Vigo at the Coia field in the Galician Championship, he broke his collarbone in a collision with Celta's Luis Pasarín, although he remained on the field until the end.

On 19 May 1925, González left Elche upon receiving a call from his friend Bernabéu to return to Madrid, doing so even after Elche, in a desperate attempt to retain him, offered him a position as a councilor on the city council. In his second stint at Madrid, he only scored 1 goal in 7 matches, helping his side win the Centro championship again. In total, he scored 12 goals in 30 official matches for Madrid.

=== Later career ===
After leaving Madrid in 1926, González signed as a player-coach for Gimnástica de Torrelavega, but just a few months later, on 9 February 1927, his playing career came to an end following a traffic accident while riding his motorcycle to watch a Cantabria Championship match between Unión Club and Racing de Santander.

== International career ==
In July 1920, while on military leave in his hometown, González was invited to participate in the so-called "probables versus posibles" matches, which were held in the Coia stadium in Vigo with the aim of finding a team to represent Spain at the 1920 Olympic Games in Antwerp; he started two matches for the probable team, and even though he even scored a goal to help his side to a 4–0, he was never really considered by the national coach Paco Bru.

== Managerial career ==
=== Early success ===
After his career as a player ended in 1927, González remained linked to Torrelavega, now as a coach, which he oversaw for two more years, from 1927 until 1929, when he decided to return to Coruña due to the poor health of his father. In August of that year, he was appointed as the new coach of Deportivo, then in the Segunda División, thus becoming the second Coruña native to hold this position after Andrés Balsa. He was also registered as a player in case his participation in any match was necessary, which happened in some matches of the Galician Championship, due to injuries to Eguía and Ramón González, as well as on the third day against Valencia on 15 December 1929, in which the 32-year-old González helped his side to a 3–1 victory. In the following month, however, on 26 January 1930, he resigned after a heavy defeat to Real Murcia (6–2), being replaced by Félix Gila.

In the following year, in March 1931, González married María Suárez Vicent, with whom he had three children, including David Ricardo, who was also a footballer, playing in the Second Division for the likes of Salamanca, Caudal Deportivo, and Hércules in the 1950s. In August 1931, following a hiatus of 18 months, he returned to the world of football as coach of Nacional de Madrid, on a recommendation by his friend Zamora, who was the godfather to his son David Ricardo. Surprisingly, González managed to lead Nacional to a runner-up finish in the 1932 Mancomunado Centro-Aragón tournament, which qualified the club to the Copa del Rey, where they knocked out Júpiter in the round of 32 before losing to Celta de Vigo in the round of 16. After a mixed second season, González left the club to return to Elche, which he led to a runner-up finish in Group A of the Tercera División, thus reaching the promotion playoff, of which he was not a part of because, on 1 February, he once again exchanged Elche for Madrid due to unsatisfaction over his salary.

His work at Nacional and Elche did not go unnoticed by Real Zaragoza, who showed interest in signing him, with González accepting the offer only after Zaragoza agreed with a series of demands, including a monthly salary of 700 pesetas and full authority over the team and the lineups. In his first (and only) season at the club (1934–35), he began to forge the famous "Alifantes" team, but his calm authority and knowledge proved insufficient as Zaragoza finished second to last in the regional championship and failed to achieve promotion. However, a deep run in the 1935 Copa del Presidente de la República earned him a firm offer from Racing de Santander, then in La Liga, which he accepted, thus replacing Randolph Galloway as the new coach of Racing, a position that he held for just one year. In his first (and only) season at Racing, he led them to a fourth place finish, behind only Athletic Bilbao, Madrid, and Real Oviedo.

=== Civil War ===
During his season at the helm of Racing, González found himself in a controversy in the Cantabrian press with the lawyer Roberto Álvarez Eguren, a former Racing player and also former president of the Cantabrian Football Federation, who was later appointed president of the People's Tribunal of Santander at the outbreak of the Spanish Civil War, from which position he forced González's resignation as Racing manager and then his imprisonment on 26 August 1937, having been accused of not being in favor of the Popular Front. While in prison, he suffered an episode of manic persecutory obsession and attempted suicide by jumping into the courtyard as he was being led to his cell, having just been assured that all of his three children would be transferred to the Soviet Union.

Having sustained a severe concussion during his suicide attempt, González was sent to the Valdecilla Hospital, where he was found by the Francoist troops when they entered the city, and due to his poor mental state, including a great loss of memory, his family admitted him to the Conjo Sanatorium in Coruña, close to Santiago de Compostela. When he regained consciousness, he initially thought that he was being held by Socialist militants on false charges of murder in Santander. In June 1940 the authorities of the institution allowed him to go out to attend a match between Deportivo and Compostela Sporting, and soon after he was appointed coach of the latter team, which had among its ranks several political prisoners who were also allowed to go out only to play in the team's matches.

=== Later career ===
After leaving the sanatorium in December 1942, González was the subject of a tribute match on 3 January 1943 at the Estadio Riazor, where a Deportivo team with several veterans faced a Galician team reinforced by his friend Zamora, which ended in a 3–3 draw.

González went on to coach Salamanca in the 1943–44 season, and then Eldense in the following season. In 1945, he returned to Compostela, where he coached Compostela FC as an amateur, which ceased to exist in 1946, so he then Club Santiago in the following season. In June 1947, he was the subject of a tribute match between Santiago and Club Arenal, in which the 50-year-old González started for the former side, forming a forward line with veterans Ramón Polo and Vicente Rey.

== Later life and death ==
Outside football, González worked as a union official, a job provided to him by his friend Fernando Fuertes de Villavicencio, a former Atlético Madrid player, and he remained there until the end of his working life. A multifaceted man, he was also a painter, a poet, and a composer of several compositions for the Follas Novas choir, including Como ch'eu quero ("As I want") with lyrics by Leandro Carré Alvarellos and harmonized by Manuel Fernández Amor.

González died in Coruña on 9 February 1976, at the age of 78.

== Honours ==
Real Madrid

- Centro Championship:
  - Champions (3): 1919–20, 1921–22, and 1925–26

== See also ==
- List of Real Madrid CF players
- List of Deportivo de La Coruña managers
