= 1925 FA Charity Shield =

- Event: FA Charity Shield
Amateurs	Professionals
6	1
- Date: 5 October 1925
- Venue: White Hart Lane, Tottenham, London
- Attendance: c. 5,000

The 1925 FA Charity Shield was the twelfth staging of the FA Charity Shield, an annual association football match arranged to raise funds for charitable causes supported by the Football Association (the FA), the governing body of football in England. For the fourth time, the match was contested by select teams of amateur and professional players. It was played on 5 October 1925 at White Hart Lane, London, and ended as a 6–1 win for the Amateurs. Claude Ashton scored four goals and Frank Macey two for the Amateurs; Charlie Hannaford scored the Professionals' goal.

== Pre-match ==
For the third year running, the Football Association decided the Shield should be contested not by club sides but by teams of amateur and professional players selected by the FA's International Selection Committee. While the Amateur XI was made up of the top players in amateur football, including several with international experience, the professionals were chosen from among those who had taken part in the FA XI's tour of Australia from May to August, so included only players whose clubs had been prepared to release them for several months and risk their exhaustion or injury. The match was to be played in the afternoon of Monday 5 October 1925 at White Hart Lane, the north London ground of Tottenham Hotspur F.C.

The teams lined up as originally selected, with two exceptions. Alfred Bower was chosen to captain the Amateurs, but dislocated his shoulder; he was replaced as left back by E.H. Gates of London Caledonians and as captain by Claude Ashton. The Professionals' forward line had to be reorganised at short notice after Stan Seymour replaced the injured Bert Batten of Plymouth Argyle, who had scored 47 goals on the Australian tour.

== Match summary ==
Centre-forward Ashton gave the Amateurs the lead after five minutes, with a hard shot into the corner off Walter Bellamy's cross. In the next quarter of an hour, the Professionals hit the frame of the goal three times. On the first occasion, Benjamin Howard Baker rushed out of goal but failed to collect Ernie Simms' shot; the ball struck the foot of the post, and Gates was able to clear before it spun back into the net. Then a shot from Jimmy Walsh and a volley by Jack Elkes each struck a post, rebounded into play, and were cleared by the defence. Soon afterwards, Simms suffered a leg strain. He played on, limping on the wing, until half-time, but took no part in the second half. After 35 minutes, Ashton scored his second goal, in similar fashion to the first; he trapped Bellamy's cross and shot hard into the corner. In what remained of the first half, Frank Macey had two close-range shots, "but both were saved most brilliantly" by Harry Hardy.

Two minutes into the second half, the Professionals were awarded a penalty for handball. Seymour took the kick, but shot straight at Howard Baker, after which the Times' reporter felt the Professionals lost heart. Shortly afterwards, Ashton received a pass from Billy Bryant, dummied Cecil Poynton and hit a low drive past Hardy for his and the Amateurs' third goal. Macey chipped the ball over Hardy for the fourth, and after a passing move involving several players, Macey pulled the ball back to give Ashton a tap-in. Edgar Kail found Macey unmarked, and he "got the last goal with both Spencer and Charlton trying to worry him off the ball [which] was typical of his work throughout." With five minutes left, a move down the right wing between Walsh and Charlie Hannaford led to the latter's consolation goal for the Professionals.

=== Match details ===
5 October 1925
15:00

Amateurs	6–1	Professionals
Ashton 4 Macey 2		Hannaford

White Hart Lane, Tottenham
Attendance: c. 5,000

Amateurs			Professionals
Goalkeeper	Benjamin Howard Baker	Chelsea	Goalkeeper	Harry Hardy	Stockport County
Full back	Sgt Frank Twine	The Army	Full back	Stan Charlton Sr.	Exeter City
Full back	E.H. Gates	London Caledonians	Full back	Cecil Poynton	Tottenham Hotspur
Wing half	Bill Caesar	Dulwich Hamlet	Wing half	Jimmy Hamilton	Crystal Palace
Centre half	George Armitage	Charlton Athletic	Centre half	Charlie Spencer (capt)	Newcastle United
Wing half	Billy Bryant	Millwall	Wing half	Len Graham	Millwall
Forward	Reginald Morgan	Clapton	Forward	Charlie Hannaford	Clapton Orient
Forward	Edgar Kail	Dulwich Hamlet	Forward	Jimmy Walsh	Liverpool
Forward	Claude Ashton (capt)	Corinthian	Forward	Ernie Simms	Stockport County
Forward	Fsr Frank Macey	The Army	Forward	Jack Elkes	Tottenham Hotspur
Forward	Walter Bellamy	Dulwich Hamlet	Forward	Stan Seymour	Newcastle United

== Post-match ==
While the individual skill of the forwards drew deserved attention, Ashton's ability to take his chances and Macey's footwork and clever use of the ball in particular, the team as a whole intelligently exploited the recent amendment to the offside rule, such that a player was on-side if two, rather than the previous three, opponents were ahead of him. The half backs were strong defensively and constructive in their use of the ball, and the full backs were "capable spoilers". The Amateurs were the better side all over the field; "C.H.C.", writing in the Daily Mirror, called them "as fine an amateur side as we have seen for some seasons. There was an abandon, a joie de vivre about their football that we would like to see in more matches."

In the evening, the Football Association hosted a dinner at Frascati's restaurant in Oxford Street in honour of their Australian touring team, at which medals were presented to the tourists, many of whom had played in the afternoon's match, and to the winners of the Charity Shield. Speeches were made by Charles Clegg, president of the association, and others. The Football Association were using the match as a trial for the forthcoming full international against Wales, and three members of the Amateur team were selected for the England team: Howard Baker in goal, George Armitage at centre half, and Ashton at centre forward.

The attendance, "falling short of 5,000", was labelled "disappointing" by the Daily Express. From the proceeds of the match, the Football Association donated £50 each to the Institute of Journalists Orphan's Fund, the Royal Surgical Aid Society, the London Lock Hospital and Sheffield Royal Infirmary. The balance, of £91 17s, went to the National Institute for the Blind.

The next season's Charity Shield also pitted Amateurs against Professionals. The Amateurs again scored six goals, and Macey again scored twice.
