= Frank Macey =

English footballer

Personal information
- Date of birth: 24 October 1894
- Date of death: 3 December 1973 (aged 79)
- Place of death: Westminster, England
- Positions: Centre forward; inside left

Senior career*
Years	Team	Apps	(Gls)
1923–1936	Kingstonian	409	(232)
1925–1926	Plymouth Argyle	1	(0)

International career
1923–1928	England amateur	4	(2)
- * Club domestic league appearances and goals

Frank Macey (24 October 1894 – 3 December 1973) was an English amateur footballer who played as a forward.

He spent 15 years in the army, and was a prisoner of war for almost the entirety of the First World War. While still a serving soldier, in 1923, he joined Kingstonian F.C. He signed amateur forms with Football League club Plymouth Argyle, but played only one competitive match for them before returning to Kingstonian, for whom he played until retiring from the game in 1936. During that time, he captained the club to victory in the 1933 Amateur Cup, was capped four times for the England amateur XI, and scored twice in each match as the Amateurs beat the Professionals 6–1 in the 1925 FA Charity Shield and 6–3 in the 1926 match.

== Personal life ==
Macey was born in 1894, and joined the Royal Fusiliers when he was 15. He was captured early in the First World War, and spent most of the conflict as a prisoner of war. On his release, he acted as an interpreter for German prisoners of war in England, and after further tours of duty abroad, he returned to the Middlesex area. After leaving the army, he worked for the electricity company in Kingston upon Thames as a meter inspector.

Macey died in Westminster Hospital on 3 December 1973, at the age of 79, and was buried in Kingston Cemetery.

== Football career ==
While a serving soldier, he played for the Army XI in inter-service competition, as well as in friendly matches against club sides and against other countries' military teams. In 1923, he was selected for an Army XI that took on Aston Villa; although his team lost heavily, the Manchester Guardian wrote that "Macey was the 'star' of the Army team. He has a real gift for the game, trapping the ball like a master, feeding his wings well, and generally revealing unmistakable 'class' in all he does." They did, however, question whether his lack of height might make him better suited to wing- rather than centre-forward play. A few months later, he scored twice and set up a third as the army XI beat the French Army in Paris by three goals to one, as part of an international triangular tournament.

=== Kingstonian ===
Macey joined Athenian League club Kingstonian in 1923, while still in the army. His goals contributed to their winning the Athenian League title in 1924 and also attracted the attention of professional clubs. Football League First Division club Everton received permission in February 1926 from the then Corporal Macey's commanding officer to make an approach, the club secretary reported that he had already signed for Plymouth Argyle. He played only once for Argyle, in a Third Division South match against Reading on 27 February, before returning to Kingstonian. It was reported that "the game did not enamour him with football in professional circles".

He helped Kingstonian win the Athenian League title again in 1926, and scored as the club drew 2–2 with an Athenian League select eleven. There was more to his game than goalscoring. His "clever constructive work" was noted in a 3–0 defeat of Barking, and he "was, perhaps, the outstanding player in a skilful side" as Kingstonian won 4–1 at Cheshunt. He scored the opening goal in the London Charity Cup Final in 1929, but in a losing cause, as Dulwich Hamlet came back to win 2–1 after extra time.

According to the Daily Express of March 1931, writing about Kingstonian's match against Leyton in the London Senior Cup:

F. Macey, the diminutive Kingstonian inside-left, once again held the stage. If ever there existed an example of the phrase "little but good", it was Macey in this game. He inspired his forwards to great things, abounding in energy, popping up in the heat of the battle, and juggling with the ball like a wizard.

Kingstonian went on to the final of the competition, but Macey missed what the Express reporter called two easy chances as 10,000 spectators saw Wimbledon win by the only goal of the game. Kingstonian reached the semifinal of the 1932 Amateur Cup, losing by a single goal to Dulwhich Hamlet at Selhurst Park in front of a crowd of 27,840, then a record for an Amateur Cup match. "The outstanding player on the field was the diminutive veteran international, F.E. Macey, who played a great game in spite of the near approach of his fortieth birthday."

In the next year's Amateur Cup, Macey turned an even game against Leyton with two goals in two minutes, first lobbing the goalkeeper and then converting a cross from the right wing. In the fourth round, Macey, "playing exceptionally well", scored Kingstonian's first two goals as they eliminated Dulwhich Hamlet 4–2. In contrast, "apart from the half-backs on each side, no one played up to expectations" in the final, against Stockton on a hard pitch at Champion Hill, Dulwhich, which finished as a 1–1 draw and was further spoilt by a Stockton player being knocked unconscious by a kick to the head. The match was replayed at Feethams, Darlington, a venue more convenient for Stockton's players. Again, Stockton lost a player to injury; right-back Thompson broke his leg with his team one goal ahead, and Kingstonian went on to win by four goals to one. As team captain, Macey was presented with the trophy by Sir Charles Clegg, president of the Football Association. His team returned to a civic welcome, a band to play them into the town, and more than 20,000 people lining the streets.

Writing in his Daily Mirror column at the start of the 1933–34 season, former England international Billy Bryant suggested that Macey "looks like going on for ever". In November, he scored twice as Kingstonian reached the London Cup final at Leyton's expense, In that season's FA Cup, Macey found himself "trying to fill both right half and inside right positions at the same time", after Kingstonian lost both wing halves to injury and lost 7–1 to League club Bristol City, and in the Amateur Cup, he was himself one of several players injured as Wimbledon enjoyed a comfortable win. He announced his retirement at the end of that season, but returned in November 1934 to assist his former club against Leyton in the FA Cup. "He showed much of his old form", but that was not enough to prevent Kingstonian losing 2–0. He finally retired in 1936, after what Kingstonian's website calls "13 years of magnificent service", and (as of 2013) remains their second-highest goalscorer.

=== Representative football ===
Macey made frequent appearances in representative matches at various levels, for league, county or Football Association elevens. While with Kingstonian, as captain of the Athenian League XI, he scored twice and "played an inspired and inspiring game" as they beat the Isthmian League 7–1 in 1926 (though the nominally superior Isthmians were reduced to ten fit men an at early stage of the game). In 1929, he was noted as playing "particularly well" for the Isthmian League eleven in their annual fixture against Corinthians, despite the League losing 5–0. Macey represented both Middlesex and Surrey counties at various times in his career, and scored twice as the London Association beat a Cologne Fieldsports touring team in 1929: he "was always on the alert to seize a chance to score, and he was quick and accurate in passing".

In 1927, he represented London's amateurs against the professionals in the Football Association's annual match for the Lord Kinnaird memorial fund. Among numerous other selections, he played for FA elevens against Cambridge University, against Norfolk in a match celebrating that county association's jubilee, and against the army.

==== FA Charity Shield ====
Between 1923 and 1926, the Football Association decided that the FA Charity Shield should be contested not by club sides but by teams of amateur and professional players. Macey was selected for the amateur eleven in three of those four matches. In 1923, his team lost 2–0 to the Professionals. According to the Manchester Guardian, "Drummer Macey, though very smart and quick, was overshadowed by G. Wilson."

He was selected again for the 1925 match, to oppose a professional eleven chosen from among those players recently returned from an FA tour of Australia. The Amateurs won 6–1, Macey scored twice, and although he "looked a midget by contrast with the opposing defenders", the way he scored his second goal "with both Spencer and Charlton trying to worry him off the ball was typical of his work throughout". The Times' reporter wrote that "Macey, the little Army forward who is always so enormously popular with the spectators, scored two goals, and, but for almost uncanny anticipation on the part of Hardy, should have scored two more. Macey played the best game of his life in such good football, and his quick dashes to the right place to take the forward pass from his centre were examples of fine opportunities quickly realised."

He kept his place for the 1926 match, again opposing a team of FA tourists, returning this time from Canada. The Amateurs won 6–3, and the Daily Mirror reported that "no one did more to influence the result than Macey, the diminutive inside left of the Kingstonian club. He 'made' the first goal and later scored twice, his second goal being the result of one of the most wonderful shots ever seen on the City enclosure – from fully thirty yards' range". Billy Bryant, who played in the match, wrote several years later that Macey "gave the finest exposition of inside forward play I have ever seen, and quite overshadowed the more famous Bolton Wanderers' inside forwards, David Jack and Joe Smith."

=== International football ===
Macey made his debut for the England amateur team against Ireland at Selhurst Park in November 1923. He scored the opening goal from a pass by Graham Doggart, as England won 3–0, but was too often given offside. The Irish Times wrote that Macey's "zeal was a tonic in itself", but attributed England's low score as "probably due to the over anxiety of Macey, who, while giving much entertainment to the crowd, was rather disappointing in front of the net." He received his next call-up for the England amateur XI two years later, again for a match against Ireland, this time at Maidstone. He and left-wing partner Walter Bellamy, making his England debut, "did some very attractive things" as Claude Ashton scored four goals and England won 6–4. Playing against Ireland for a third time, in Belfast in November 1926, he scored a tap-in in a 3–0 win. He, Edgar Kail and Vivian Gibbins "did splendid work" in "a well-balanced forward line", according to the Daily Express.

He lost his place for the match against Scotland in December, to Cambridge University's R.G.H. Lowe; according to the Daily Mirror, Lowe "must have come on a lot to be considered good enough to displace" him. He regained it for the 1928 visit to Belfast. In a poor match, won 2–0 by England, "only Jenkins and Macey in the English attack lived up to their reputations", but both lost their places for the next match. He was twice a travelling reserve in 1931, released from the second selection to play in a cup match for his club, but never again played international football.
