= 1924 FA Charity Shield =

- Event: FA Charity Shield
Professionals	Amateurs
3	1
- Date: 6 October 1924
- Venue: Highbury, London
- Attendance: c. 10,000

The 1924 FA Charity Shield was the eleventh staging of the FA Charity Shield, an annual association football match arranged to raise funds for charitable causes supported by the Football Association (the FA), the governing body of football in England. As in the 1923 competition, the match was held between the a team of England professionals and amateurs. In contrast to previous year, the amateurs were reported as giving the professionals a much more competitive game, despite losing 3-1.

The teams played contrasting styles, with the professionals holding onto possession and attempting to open up the game, while the amateurs played a more direct style and "indulged in some good honest old-fashioned shoulder charging." Neither team scored in the first half, with Taylor performing well for the professionals in goal. Walker scored for the professionals after half-time, before an equaliser from Kail. The professionals won with two late goals, first from Buchanan and then Walker.

== Match details ==
6 October 1924
15:00

Professionals	3–1	Amateurs
Walker, Buchan		Kail

Highbury, London
Attendance: c. 11,000

1	(England) Ted Taylor, Huddersfield Town
2	(England) Alf Baker, Arsenal
3	(England) Sam Wadsworth, Huddersfield Town
4	(England) Frank Moss, Aston Villa
5	(England) Henry Healless, Blackburn Rovers
6	(England) George Green, Sheffield United
7	(England) James Spencer, West Bromwich Albion
8	(England) Charlie Buchan, Sunderland
9	(England) Harry Bedford, Blackpool
10	(England) Billy Walker, Aston Villa
11	(England) Fred Tunstall, Sheffield United

1	(England) James Mitchell, Manchester City
2	(England) E. Spencer Bishop Auckland
3	(England) Alfred Bower, Corinthians
4	(England) Albert Barrett Leytonstone
5	(England) Claude Ashton, Corinthians
6	(England) Fred Ewer, Casuals
7	(England) R.G. Jenkins, London Polytechnic
8	(England) Edgar Kail, Dulwich Hamlet
9	(England) Vivian Gibbins, Clapton
10	(England) Frank Hartley, Oxford City
11	(England) Lt Kenneth Hegan, The Army
