= 1926 FA Charity Shield =

- Event: FA Charity Shield
Amateurs	Professionals
6	3
- Date: 6 October 1926
- Venue: Maine Road, Manchester
- Attendance: 1,500

The 1926 FA Charity Shield was the thirteenth staging of the FA Charity Shield, an annual association football match arranged to raise funds for charitable causes supported by the Football Association (the FA), the governing body of football in England. For the fifth time, the match was contested by select teams of amateur and professional players. It was played on 6 October 1926, at Maine Road, Manchester, and ended as a 6–3 win for the Amateurs. Wilfred Minter and Frank Macey each scored twice, Edgar Kail once, and an own goal by Michael Keeping completed the Amateurs' scoring; Bill Rawlings scored twice and Fred Tunstall scored once for the Professionals.

== Pre-match ==
The match was to be played at Maine Road, the home ground of Manchester City F.C., alongside the exhibitions and other entertainments of the city of Manchester's Civic Week. The composition of the teams was selected by the international selection committee of the Football Association. The professionals were chosen from among those who had taken part in the Football Association XI's tour of Canada from May to July 1926.

The teams lined up as originally selected, with two exceptions. Clifford Tarr replaced the injured Richard Jenkins of Polytechnic at outside right, and Corporal Cartlidge was a late replacement for Northern Nomads's Dr Fairbrother at wing half. The Amateurs included six of the men who had beaten the Professionals by six goals to one in the corresponding fixture in 1925; the Professionals included five full England internationals.

== Match summary ==
The match began with a fine exhibition of passing by the Amateurs, but six minutes into the game David Jack fed Bill Rawlings who scored from close range to give the Professionals the lead. The lead was doubled in a similar fashion after 24 minutes. Rawlings had another two chances which he failed to take, and the Professionals seemed to be in control of the game. With half an hour gone, the Amateurs "added dash and determination to their pattern-work passing", and the tenor of the game changed dramatically. A neat pass from Frank Macey was touched over the line by Edgar Kail, and a couple of minutes later, Wilfred Minter hooked home after some "brilliant interpassing" between Macey and his left-wing partner Walter Bellamy. The score at the half-time interval remained 2–2.

Jack missed from close range just after half-time, after which the game became one-sided. Macey scored after a clever passing move, and doubled the Amateurs' lead when he volleyed Tommy Gale's punched clearance straight back past him "with surprising pace" from 30 yards (27 m). Macey had also scored twice in the 1925 FA Charity Shield match, when the Amateurs beat the Professionals by six goals to one. Minter collected a through ball and scored his second and his team's fifth off the inside of the post, and the last came when, under pressure from Macey, Michael Keeping overhit a back-pass to his goalkeeper. Fred Tunstall scored in the last minute for the Professionals, and the match ended 6–3.

=== Match details ===
6 October 1926
15:00

Amateurs	6–3	Professionals
Kail; Minter (2); Macey (2); Keeping (o.g.)		Rawlings (2); Tunstall

Maine Road, Manchester
Attendance: 1,500

Amateurs			Professionals
Goalkeeper	A.M. Russell	Cambridge University	Goalkeeper	Tommy Gale	Barnsley
Full back	Sgt Frank Twine	The Army	Full back	George Clifford	Portsmouth
Full back	E.H. Gates	London Caledonians	Full back	Michael Keeping	Southampton
Wing half	Cpl Cartlidge	The Army	Wing half	Tommy Magee	West Bromwich Albion
Centre half	Billy Bryant	Millwall	Centre half	Jimmy Waugh	Sheffield United
Wing half	F.H. Ewer	Corinthians	Wing half	George Harkus	Southampton
Forward	Clifford Tarr	Mossley	Forward	Wally Harris	Birmingham
Forward	Edgar Kail	Dulwich Hamlet	Forward	David Jack	Bolton Wanderers
Forward	Wilfred Minter	St Albans City	Forward	Bill Rawlings	Southampton
Forward	Frank Macey	Kingstonian	Forward	Joe Smith	Bolton Wanderers
Forward	Walter Bellamy	Dulwich Hamlet	Forward	Fred Tunstall	Sheffield United

== Post-match ==
Medals were presented to both teams by the Lord Mayor of Manchester, Councillor Miles E. Mitchell. The Manchester Guardian was disappointed with the Professionals, whose forwards could not finish, whose creative players were ineffective, and whose defensive players were not up to the standard of their Amateur counterparts and failed to communicate with their goalkeeper. In contrast, Bellamy crossed well, and the "indefatigable" Macey "set an example to every player on the field in the matter of shooting." They were well supported by a "hard-working set of half-backs, who stood on no ceremony, and persisted in their tackling with the relish and vigour of terriers", Bryant in particular, whose play both defensive and constructive impressed, "and [whose] ground passing was something of a model", and by a confident pair of full backs in E.H. Gates and Frank Twine. Bryant wrote some years later that Macey "gave the finest exposition of inside forward play I have ever seen, and quite overshadowed the more famous Bolton Wanderers' inside forwards, David Jack and Joe Smith." The result of the match was so unexpected that it found a place in a 1999 compilation of "football's strangest matches".

The attendance was disappointing – "no more than 1,500", according to the Times, and the Guardian called it very poor – and for the 1927 fixture, the Football Association reverted to a match between two club teams. The receipts from the match, of £181, were donated to the Ypres Memorial Church building fund.
