= José María Mateos =

Spanish journalist, football manager, and sports leader

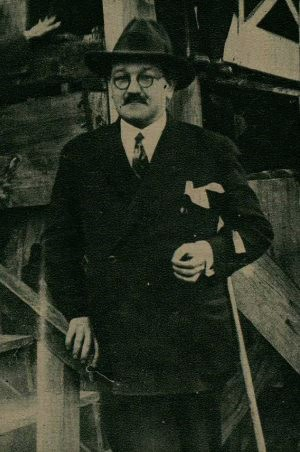
- José María Mateos in 1929
- Born: José María Mateos y Larrucea; 31 March 1888; Bilbao, Biscay, Spain
- Died: 22 December 1963 (aged 75); Bilbao, Biscay, Spain
- Citizenship: Spanish
- Occupations: Journalist; Historian; Football manager; Sports leader
- Known for: Manager of the Spanish national team
Association football career
- Full name: José María Mateos
Managerial career
- Years: Team
- 1922: Spain (1)
- 1925–1933: Spain (31)
1st President of the Biscayan Athletic Federation
In office
3 December 1917 – Unknown
1st President of the Biscayan Football Federation
In office
24 September 1922 – Unknown

José María Mateos y Larrucea (31 March 1888 – 22 December 1963) was a Spanish journalist and football manager who served as the national coach of Spain for over a decade between 1922 and 1933. He was also president of the Athletic and football federations of Biscay.

== Early life and education ==
José María Mateos was born on 31 March 1888 in Bilbao as the son of an Andalusian military doctor, stationed in Bilbao and who remarried to Guillerma Larrucea from Bilbao, a woman from Bilbao. He was orphaned at a very young age, first his father died of a heart condition at the age of 54 and then when he was seven, in 1895, his mother died of pneumonia, so it was his three aunts, his mother's sisters (Dámasa, Vicenta and Estéfana), who carried out his education, very marked by the ethical, moral, and religious values, which accompanied him throughout his life. With a strong religious background, he became part of the Congregation of the Luises, a Jesuits youth organization whose magazine Semana Católica, he would immediately direct.

Mateos studied at the Vizcaíno Institute and later the Escolapios, where he graduated in law, but never practiced law since his vocation led him towards journalism. The Escolapios had a football pitch in the Campa de los Ingleses, next to the wood warehouse, where he had his first contact with football in a team belonging to the school under the name of Vasconia. After entering the University of Deusto in 1904 to train as an engineer, he abandoned those studies to dedicate himself fully to journalism. During his time at university he played for Deusto, until a serious ankle injury sidelined him and ended his football career as a player.

== Journalist career ==
His first signature was placed in the columns of El Porvenir Vasco in 1908, and two years later, in 1910, he moved to La Gaceta del Norte, for which he was a sports reporter at the time when sports were beginning to acquire social importance. Even though his physical abilities were greatly diminished, as he had suffered the amputation of one leg and subsequently became practically blind, he remained in La Gaceta until his retirement. He created the sports section of this Bilbao newspaper, becoming one of the most influential journalists of his time.

Due to the lack of knowledge that the players and the general public had of the rules of the game, Mateos, as an extension of his journalistic side, published said regulations in La Gaceta, but doing so in installments, pleasantly and entertainingly, the so-called Spanish football yearbooks, but they were on the market only for the 1922–23 and 1923–24 seasons. His books "From Antwerp to Montevideo" (1929) and "Athletic Club de Bilbao", had better luck.

Mateos was one of the founders of the Bilbao Press Association in 1921, serving as its president on several occasions. He was also director of the Hoja del Lunes from its first issue in 1926. He also founded the Látigo Spotivo together with the journalist Rolando, and collaborated with the accurate chronicles of him in the sports newspaper Marca.

== Football ==
On 3 December 1917, when the Biscayan Athletic Federation was established, Mateos was elected its first president, representing the Bilbao Sports Club, and organizing the first Vizcayan Track Championships, with the participation of many footballers converted into athletes. Given the tension between the provinces that made up the Northern Federation (Federación Norte), it was decided to disintegrate, re-emerging new federations, and thus, on 24 September 1922, the Royal Spanish Football Federation (RFEF) approved the new Biscayan Federation (Federación Vizcaína), with Mateos as its first president. He later became its president again immediately before the Spanish Civil War, during the war, and continued after the war in the Franco zone.

Mateos never hid his great love for Athletic Bilbao, with the results of the matches drastically affecting his mood, but despite being passionate about Athletic, Mateos always knew how to be impartial in his journalistic comments and chronicles. In addition to writing about football in his journalistic chronicles, he was the first to publish a book on Athletic's history in 1922, called Desde 1898 a 1922, and published a second part of the history of Athletic in 1948, called Cincuenta años del Athletic Club de Bilbao: 1898-1948 ("Fifty years of Athletic Club de Bilbao: 1898-1948"). In these works, he narrated the birth of the club in his own way, laying the foundations for what would become over time an unsustainable fable, dating the official founding of Athletic Club to 1898 in an obvious attempt to recognize Athletic as older than Joan Gamper's FC Barcelona, but also to achieve that Athletic was older than Bilbao FC, and thus minimize the British influence in the birth of Bilbao football. In fact, he never mentioned the Club Atleta de los Astilleros del Nervión, nor the Bilbao FC of 1892, two entities founded by British, perhaps due to simple ignorance, but according with historian Josu Turuzeta Zarraga, Mateos intentionally ignored its British background because he was "a Spanish patriot and a fervent Catholic". In the 1948 version, he did include the match between the English and Bilbainos, although reducing it to a "myth".

Deeply knowledgeable about the ins and outs of football, directors and presidents of Athletic often came to consult with him on difficult questions, or to beg his intercession in the federation offices. On at least two occasions they tried to make him a manager, which Mateos refused due to his high concept of journalistic impartiality. Athletic recognized his work by granting him the gold and diamond insignia.

=== Managerial career ===
Until the 1960s, it was very common to give the reins of the national team not to renowned technicians, but to federations and even prominent journalists, such as Mateos, Ramón Melcón, and Pedro Escartín. After its creation in 1920, Spain was successively directed by various technical commissions and in 1922, the then president of Athletic, Ricardo Irezabal, used his influence in the National Football Committee to achieve the appointment of Mateos, who thus became a member of a triumvirate made up of himself, Manuel de Castro and Salvador Díaz, making his debut in a friendly match against France in Bordeaux on 30 April, which ended in a 4–0 victory.

In 1925, Mateos was appointed again to the technical team of the national team, where he remained until 1927 for a total of six games, first with Castro in 1925, and then with Ezequiel Montero in 1926. After a brief parenthesis, in which José Berraondo was in charge of Spain at the 1928 Olympic Games in Paris, Mateos returned to the Spanish bench in 1929, this time alone, except for two matches in which he had the support of the Englishman Fred Pentland. He made his debut as the sole coach against Portugal in Seville on 17 March 1929, which ended in a resounding 5–0 win, with goals from Gaspar Rubio (3) and José Padrón (2), all of them scored during the first 45 minutes, but after the restart of the match, Mateos observed that his team was taking it excessively calmly, almost like a party, so he advised the federation that from then on a bonus be created for each goal that exceeded the winning goal, to which they agreed, setting that stimulus at 50 pesetas per goal. This stimulus apparently worked because in his second match on 14 April 1929, against France, at the Torrero field in Zaragoza, Spain found themselves leading 8–0 in the 85th minute and was still trying to score the ninth, which meant 350 pesetas for each one, so goalkeeper Ricardo Zamora left his goal and approached Mateos and told him sarcastically "How much would you give me if I let them score a goal and you would save a lot of pesetas and...", but he did not have time to continue since Émile Veinante took possession of the ball and then shot from almost fifty meters to seal a 8–1 win.

His greatest achievement at the helm of Spain happened in his third match as the solo manager in the famous clash against England at the Estadio Metropolitano on 15 May. He had given 10 players their first international cap across the two previous matches, but no new debutants were announced for the England match. Surprisingly, he opted not to select any players from Barcelona despite their being crowned inaugural La Liga champions a month later. The British had played 22 games against teams from Continental Europe, winning 21 and drawing once, with 120 goals for and 28 against, but his side managed to defeat them 4–3 thanks to a late goal from Severiano Goiburu, thus becoming the first team from that region to defeat England, and doing so in the first meeting between the two countries. Such was the prestige of the match for the Spanish, it was the first ever to be publicly broadcast via radio. The referee of the match, John Langenus, who was also a journalist, stated that he was amazed by the quality of the game.

Two years later, on 12 September 1931, both teams met again in Highbury, with the only survivors from the 1929 game being Mateos on the bench, and Zamora and Jacinto Quincoces on the field; it ended in a resounding 1–7 loss, which is still the worst defeat in the team's history. However, Mateos redeemed himself by achieving the team's largest victory in his very last match on 23 May, against Bulgaria (13–0), at the Chamartín stadium. At the end of the match, Mateos went to the federation headquarters to say goodbye, where the General Secretary Ricardo Cabot relieved him from his duties. An epic afternoon, but at the same time catastrophic for the treasurer of the Spanish Federation, since it meant 600 pesetas to each player as a bonus, totaling a whopping 6,600, a great figure for the time, but when Mateos left, the bonuses for goal difference disappeared in order to avoid repeating accounting imbalances as sovereign as the one that occurred when crushing Bulgaria.

Mateos remained as the coach of Spain from 1925 to 1933, thus covering the nine years proclaimed in the title of his book, but when his match in 1922 is taken into account, then he was the coach of Spain for 11 years, thus setting the record for the longest managerial reign of the Spanish national team until László Kubala surpassed him in the 1970s. As a solo coach, he retired with a very positive record of 24 games played (all friendlies), 17 wins, 3 draws, and 4 losses, thus winning 70% of his Spain matches. In total, he coached 32 games, with 20 wins, 6 draws, and 6 losses for a winning percentage of 71.9%. When he described himself as a coach, Mateos stated "I am nothing more than an amateur, quite a veteran, with a very good desire and.....nothing more. My job as a coach gave me friendships among fans and fellow journalists".

== Other endeavours ==
In addition to sports issues, he also put his social vocation into practice in positions such as that of member of the Orphan Asylum of Bilbao (1922) or secretary of the Provincial Anti-Tuberculosis Board of Biscay.

In the elections to the Bilbao City Council on 5 February 1922, Mateos was elected councilor for the Basque Nationalist-Communion party, representing the Gran Vía district. He maintained harsh debates about the Royal Cortina Decree and proposed the creation of schools of physical education.

== Personal and later life ==
In 1930, Mateos married María Purificación de Lacunza y Goiri, but they had no children.

On 10 April 1937, the news was made public that Mateos had been shot in Bilbao, but this news would not be true and months later, on 21 September, he was appointed sole Manager of the Biscayan Federation. On 14 September 1939, the Executive Commission of the National Sports Council met to appoint the Board of Directors of the RFEF, and Julián Troncoso, as the new president of the RFEF, appointed the territorial presidents as members, including Mateos.

In March 1946, Mateos was awarded the prize from the National Sports Delegation, for his work in favor of sports and particularly for his work as a sports critic; the prize was given to him by General Moscardo.

In 1950, Mateos published his most important work, Nueve años de seleccionador ("Nine Years as a Coach") (1950), where he recounted his experiences as the coach of the Spanish national team. He donated the benefits of this book in favor of the Biscayan footballers.

In 1952, the "José María Mateos" trophy was created, and on 28 June, he himself presented the cup to the captain of SD Indautxu, Pachi Urquiola, winner of the final against Barakaldo CF with a result of 1–0.

In December 1958, in the Basilica of Begoña, the Charity Cross was imposed on him as a tribute to his good work for the benefit of others. He also received a belated tribute from the press and sports, shortly before he died at his home, when, almost blind, it was already impossible for him to write.

Mateos reduced his journalistic activity due to a surgical intervention, in which a leg had to be amputated, and as a result of his illness he became blind, but even so, he continued to send articles to La Gaceta; he spoke and his wife wrote.

== Death ==
Mateos died in his home on Herao Street in Bilbao on 22 December 1963, at the age of 75. His funeral was a great demonstration, where all the Bilbotarras said their last goodbye.
