= 1923 FA Charity Shield =

- Event: FA Charity Shield
Professionals	Amateurs
2	0
- Date: 8 October 1923
- Venue: Stamford Bridge, Chelsea, London
- Attendance: c. 11,000

The 1923 FA Charity Shield was the tenth staging of the FA Charity Shield, an annual association football match arranged to raise funds for charitable causes supported by the Football Association (the FA), the governing body of football in England. Following a series of matches between club teams, the format of the competition changed in 1923 to a game between select teams of amateur and professional players. The competition used this format for the next four seasons. The match also saw the competition move from a dates in May, as had previously been used, to October. £730 was raised for charities.

The match was played on 8 October 1923 at Stamford Bridge, London, and ended as a 2–0 win for the Professionals. While the first half saw both teams competing, the superior fitness of the Professionals paid off in the second half. Both goals came after half-time, scored by Bradford and Chambers.

== Match details ==
8 October 1923
15:00

Professionals	2–0	Amateurs
Bradford; Chambers

Stamford Bridge, London
Attendance: c. 11,000

1	(England) Ted Taylor, Huddersfield Town
2	(England) Warney Cresswell, Sunderland
3	(England) Sam Wadsworth, Huddersfield Town
4	(England) Sid Bishop, West Ham United
5	(England) George Wilson, The Wednesday
6	(England) Tommy Meehan, Chelsea
7	(England) Frank Osborne, Fulham
8	(England) David Jack, Bolton Wanderers
9	(England) Joe Bradford, Birmingham City
10	(England) Harry Chambers, Liverpool
11	(England) Fred Tunstall, Sheffield United

1	(England) Bert Coleman, Dulwich Hamlet
2	(England) Sgt F. Twice, The Army
3	(England) Alfred Bower, Corinthians
4	(England) Basil Patchitt, Corinthians
5	(England) George Armitage, Wimbledon
6	(England) Fred Ewer, Casuals
7	(England) Lt Kenneth Hegan, The Army
8	(England) Stan Earle, Clapton
9	(England) Drummer Frank Macey, The Army
10	(England) Graham Doggart, Bishop Auckland
11	(England) Leonard Barry, Notts County
