= Ernest Coleman =

Ernest Coleman may refer to:

- Ernest Coleman (physicist) (1941–1990), American particle physicist
- Bert Coleman (1889–1958), English footballer, played for England and Dulwich Hamlet
- Ernie Coleman (footballer) (1908–1984), English footballer, played for Grimsby Town, Arsenal and Middlesbrough
- Ernie Coleman (rugby union), Welsh international rugby union player
