= Charlie Hannaford =

Charlie Hannaford may refer to:

- Charlie Hannaford (footballer)
- Charlie Hannaford (rugby union)
