= List of Spain national football team managers =

This is the statistical table of Spain national football team managers. The Spain national football team represents Spain in international men's football competitions since 1920.

Until the 1960s, there were several pula periods where more than one coach was deemed to be in charge of the team. In the table, the matches are counted only once, with each partnership included as a managerial spell (some coaches therefore have more than one entry – for example José María Mateos was involved in two three-man partnerships then later took sole charge) and the individual manager's total included as a note where applicable.

== Statistics ==
As of 14 November 2026

Manager	National coach	Spain career	G	W	D	L	GF	GA	Win % (Note: A draw counts as a ½ win)	Major competitions and Honours
(Spain) José Berraondo		1913	1	0	1	0	1	1	50%	
selection commission	(Spain) Francisco Bru	1920	5	4	0	1	9	5	80%	Summer Olympics 1920
selection commission	(Spain) Julián Ruete (Note: According to the RFEF managers list, Julián Ruete was in joint charge of 3 matches in total: 3W 0D 0L. The BDFutbol website has him in joint charge of a fourth match (4–0 victory), but RFEF attributes this to Manuel de Castro and Salvador Díaz.) (Spain) Manuel de Castro (Note: De Castro was in joint charge of 10 matches in total: 9W 0D 1L.)	1921–1922	3	3	0	0	7	2	100%	
selection commission	(Spain) Salvador Díaz (Note: According to the RFEF managers list, Salvador Díaz was in joint charge of 1 match (4–0 victory), but BDFutbol website attributes this to Manuel de Castro and Julián Ruete.) (Spain) Manuel de Castro	1922	1	1	0	0	4	0	100%	
selection commission	(Spain) Luis Argüello (Spain) Joaquín Heredia (Spain) David Ormaechea (Note: 3 managers involved according to the RFEF managers list; only Argüello is listed on the BDFutbol website.)	1923	2	1	0	1	3	1	50%	
selection commission	(Spain) José García (Spain) Pedro Parages (Note: Parages was in joint and sole charge of 3 matches in total: 1W 1D 1L.)	1923–1924	2	1	1	0	3	0	75%	
(Spain) Pedro Parages		1924	1	0	0	1	0	1	0%	Summer Olympics 1924: 1R
selection commission	(Spain) Luis Colina (Spain) José Rosich (Spain) Julián Olave	1924	1	1	0	0	2	1	100%	
(Spain) Fernando Gutiérrez		1925	3	3	0	0	6	0	100%	
selection commission	(Spain) Ricardo Cabot (Spain) Manuel de Castro (Spain) José María Mateos (Note: Mateos was in sole and joint charge of 22 matches in total: 15W 3D 4L.)	1925	2	2	0	0	2	0	100%	
selection commission	(Spain) Ezequiel Montero (Spain) José María Mateos (Spain) Manuel de Castro	1926–1927	4 (Note: Does not include a win over Portugal in 1927 played on the same day as a defeat to Italy; see Spain national football team results (unofficial matches) for details.)	3	0	1	9	6	75%	
(Spain) José Berraondo		1928	2	0	2	0	3	3	50%	Summer Olympics 1928: QF
(Spain) José Berraondo	(Spain) Benito Díaz	1928	3	1	1	1	9	9	50%	Summer Olympics 1928: QF
(Spain) José María Mateos		1929–1933	16	10	3	3	57	19	71.88%	biggest victory (13–0)
(Spain) Amadeo García		1934–1936	12	6	2	4	30	15	58.33%	1934 World Cup: QF
(Spain) Eduardo Teus		1941–1942	6	3	2	1	15	10	66.67%	
(Spain) Jacinto Quincoces		1945	2	1	1	0	6	4	75%	
(Spain) Luis Pasarín		1946	1	0	0	1	0	1	0%	
(Spain) Pablo Hernández (Note: Pablo Hernández was in joint and sole charge of 6 matches in total: 2W 0D 4L.)		1947	2	0	0	2	3	7	0%	
(Spain) Guillermo Eizaguirre (1) (Note: Eizaguirre was in sole charge of 19 matches in total: 8W 6D 5L.)		1948–1949	6	2	3	1	10	7	58.33%	1950 FIFA World Cup: 4th
(Spain) Guillermo Eizaguirre	(Spain) Benito Díaz	1949–1950	10	6	2	2	26	17	70%	1950 FIFA World Cup: 4th
selection commission	(Spain) Félix Quesada (Spain) Luis Iceta (Spain) Paulino Alcántara (Note: According to the BDFutbol website, Benito Díaz was also in charge for two of these matches (3–3 draw, 0–0 draw); however he is not included in the RFEF list of managers.)	1951	3	1	2	0	9	6	66.67%	
(Spain) Ricardo Zamora		1952	2	1	1	0	6	0	50%	
(Spain) Pedro Escartín (1) (Note: Escartín was in sole charge of 12 matches in total: 7W 3D 2L.)		1952–1953	5	2	1	2	7	6	50%	
(Spain) Luis Iribarren		1953–1954	4	1	2	1	8	6	50%	
(Spain) Ramón Melcón		1955	2	0	1	1	2	3	0%	
selection commission	(Spain) José Luis del Valle (Spain) Emilio Jiménez (Spain) Juan Touzón (Spain) Pablo Hernández	1955	1	1	0	0	3	0	100%	
(Spain) Guillermo Eizaguirre (1)		1955–1956	3	0	1	2	4	9	16.67%	
(Spain) Manuel Meana		1956–1959	12	7	3	2	35	16	58.33%	
selection commission	(Argentina) (France) Helenio Herrera (Note: Herrera was in joint and sole charge of 9 matches in total: 6W 0D 3L.)	1959–1960	6	5	0	1	22	10	83.33%	
selection commission	(Spain) José Luis Costa (Spain) José Luis Lasplazas (Spain) Ramón Gabilondo	1960	6	3	0	3	13	11	50%	
(Spain) Pedro Escartín (2)		1961	7	5	2	0	12	5	85.71%	
(Spain) Pablo Hernández	(Argentina) (France) Helenio Herrera	1962	3	1	0	2	2	3	33.33%	1950 FIFA World Cup: GS
(Spain) José Villalonga		1962–1966	22	9	5	8	35	28	52.27%	1964 European Nations' Cup; 1966 FIFA World Cup: GS
(Spain) Domènec Balmanya		1966–1968	11	4	3	4	11	9	50%	
(Spain) Eduardo Toba		1968–1969	4	1	2	1	5	4	50%	
selection commission	(Spain) Luis Molowny (Spain) Salvador Artigas (Spain) Miguel Muñoz (Note: Muñoz was in joint and sole charge of 63 matches in total: 32W 16D 15L.)	1969	4	2	1	1	3	3	62.5%	
(Hungary) (Spain) László Kubala		1969–1980	68	30	22	16	97	59	60.29%	1978 FIFA World Cup: GS
(Uruguay) (Spain) José Santamaría		1980–1982	24	10	8	6	31	21	58.33%	1982 FIFA World Cup: 2R
(Spain) Miguel Muñoz		1982–1988	59	30	15	14	101	57	63.56%	UEFA Euro 1984; 1986 FIFA World Cup: QF
(Spain) Luis Suárez		1988–1991	27	15	4	8	55	28	62.96%	1990 FIFA World Cup: OF
(Spain) Vicente Miera		1991–1992	8	4	2	2	11	7	62.5%	
(Spain) Javier Clemente		1992–1998	62	36	20	6	130	44	74.19%	1994 FIFA World Cup: QF; 1998 FIFA World Cup: GS
(Spain) José Antonio Camacho		1998–2002	44	28	9	7	105	37	73.86%	2002 FIFA World Cup: QF
(Spain) Iñaki Sáez		2002–2004	23	15	6	2	44	11	78.26%	
(Spain) Luis Aragonés		2004–2008	54	38	12	4	101	31	81.48%	2006 FIFA World Cup: OF; UEFA Euro 2008
(Spain) Vicente del Bosque		2008–2016	114	87	10	17	254	79	80.7%	Conference Cup 2009; 2010 FIFA World Cup; UEFA Euro 2012; Conference Cup 2013; 2014 FIFA World Cup: GS
(Spain) Julen Lopetegui		2016–2018	20	14	6	0	61	13	85%	
(Spain) Fernando Hierro		2018	4	1	3	0	7	6	62.5%	2018 FIFA World Cup: OF
(Spain) Luis Enrique (1)		2018–2019	8	6	0	2	19	9	75%	
(Spain) Robert Moreno		2019	9	7	2	0	29	4	88.89%	
(Spain) Luis Enrique (2)		2019–2022	39	20	14	5	76	28	69.23%	UEFA Euro 2020; Nations League 2021; 2022 FIFA World Cup: OF
(Spain) Luis de la Fuente		2022–present	54	42	10	2	140	40	87.04%	Nations League 2023; UEFA Euro 2024; Nations League 2025; 2026 FIFA World Cup
