= Manuel de Castro =

Manuel de Castro is the name of:

- Manuel de Castro (journalist), Spanish sports journalist
- Noli de Castro, Filipino broadcaster, journalist, and politician
