= Landells =

Landells is a surname, and may refer to:

- Ebenezer Landells (1808–1860), British wood-engraver, illustrator and magazine proprietor
- Jack Landells (1904–1986), English footballer
- Suzie Landells (born 1964), known after marriage as Suzanne Dill-Macky, Australian swimmer
