= Albert Harrison (footballer, born 1904) =

English footballer

Personal information
- Date of birth: 15 February 1904
- Place of birth: Leigh, England
- Height: 5 ft 10 in (1.78 m)
- Position: Centre half

Youth career
- West Leigh
- Wigan Road Villa

Senior career*
| Years | Team | Apps | (Gls) |
| 1922–1924 | Wigan Borough | 6 | (0) |
- Atherton Collieries
- Chorley
| 1927–1929 | Nottingham Forest | 77 | (5) |
| 1929–1931 | Leicester City | 32 | (1) |
- Dundalk
- Drumcondra
| 1933–1934 | Wigan Athletic | 9 | (0) |
- Lugano
- * Club domestic league appearances and goals

Albert Harrison (born 15 February 1904; date of death unknown) was an English footballer who played as a centre half.

Harrison started his career at Wigan Borough, making six Football League appearances for the club. He then spent a few years in non-league football before joining Second Division side Nottingham Forest in 1927. He scored five goals in 77 games for Forest, and was selected in the England XI squad for the FA's tour to South Africa in 1929. His performances attracted the attention of First Division club Leicester City, who signed him later that year. He played for the "Professionals" in the 1929 FA Charity Shield.
