= 1929 Spain v England football match =

Spain v England (1929)
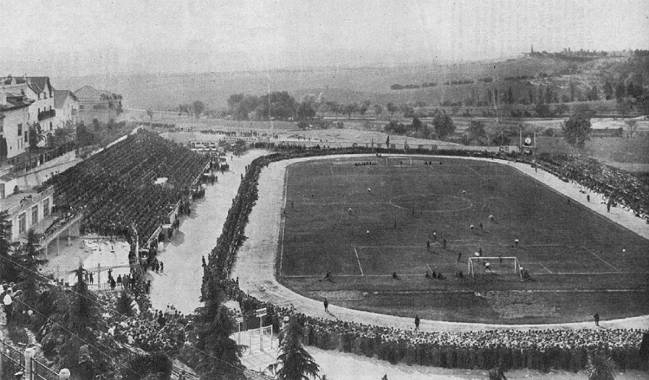
- Event: International friendly
Spain	England
(Spain)	(England)
4	3
- Date: 15 May 1929
- Venue: Estadio Metropolitano, Madrid
- Referee: John Langenus (Belgium)
- Attendance: 45,000

On 15 May 1929 at the Estadio Metropolitano in Madrid, the home stadium of Atlético Madrid, England's national team were defeated 4–3 by Spain in a friendly international football match. As a result, Spain became the first team from Continental Europe to defeat England, and doing so in the first meeting between the two countries. Such was the prestige of the match for the Spanish, it was the first ever to be publicly broadcast via radio. The match was refereed by Belgian official John Langenus, believed to be the top referee in the world at the time.

The Home Nations had popularised the sport, and England were widely viewed as the greatest team in the world in the early 20th century. Their first matches against continental European sides resulted in high-scoring victories, but after World War I the gap in quality eventually narrowed, due in part to England's insularity and failure to evolve, as well as the increase in skill and innovation throughout Europe. Though England were favourites and in good form going into the match, the standard of Spanish football was greatly improving due to the influence of expat English coaches such as Atlético manager Fred Pentland, who at the time was assisting the Spain national team, as well as the recent professionalising of the sport, which included the creation of La Liga.

Despite being played in searing heat which favoured the hosts, England went 2–0 up inside the opening 20 minutes through goals by Joe Carter and Joe Bradford following mistakes by goalkeeper Ricardo Zamora, a mainstay for Spain since their first international in 1920, and who injured his sternum early on. Spain came back into the match and levelled the score, goals from Gaspar Rubio and Jaime Lazcano making it 2–2 shortly before the half-time interval. England retook the lead in the second half thanks to a Carter penalty kick, only for Spain to again draw level and then take the lead themselves; Rubio scored the equaliser with 10 minutes remaining, and then Severiano Goiburu, an amateur footballer, scored the match winning goal. Both goals resulted in a pitch invasion from ecstatic Spanish fans which caused slight delays to the match, and no further goals ensured Spain had made history.

The British press gave little coverage to the result, while those in the Spanish media were enthusiastic about Spain's performance and doubtful as to the quality of the English players. The match marked the final time a non-league football player represented England, Edgar Kail of Dulwich Hamlet never being selected to play for his country again, along with six other players. Neither team attended the following years' inaugural FIFA World Cup, but the two sides eventually competed in a rematch at the request of England; the fixture, played at Highbury in December 1931, was won 7–1 by the home side.

== Background ==
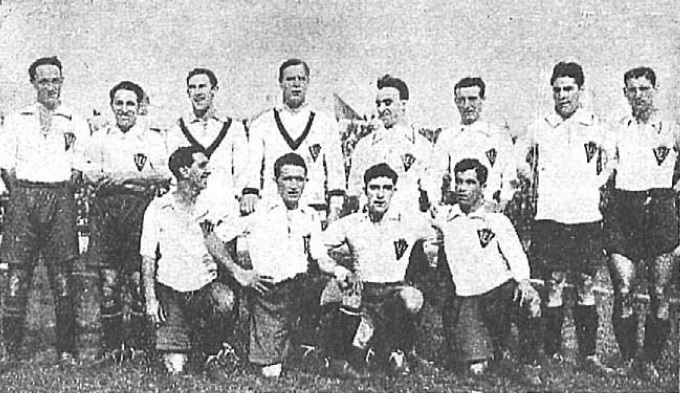
Spain's team for the match against Portugal

In the early 20th century, England viewed matches against teams from Continental Europe as an act of generosity, and The Football Association had created a second team with the purpose of playing in the matches. Spain had been one of the seven founder members of FIFA in 1904, a worldwide governing body for the sport intended to advance and organise the sport collectively, and though they initially refused to join, England would join the following year, which allowed the Home Nations four individual football associations to remain separate. Though the England amateur team had already played on the continent, England departed the British Isles to play full internationals for the first time in the summer of 1908, defeating Austria 6–1 in their first match.

Demonstrating just how far England were ahead of the rest of the world at this point, this was followed by an 11–1 victory against the same opponents, a 7–0 win against Hungary, and finishing the tour with a 4–0 win over Bohemia. Until the match against Spain, England had been undefeated in 23 matches against foreign opposition, winning 22 of them, with only the winners of the 1920 Olympics, Belgium, avoiding defeat, drawing 2–2 in 1923; such was the "humdrum" nature of these matches, they "barely warranted a mention in sporting press" according to writer Rory Smith in his book Mister: The Men Who Taught The World How To Beat England At Their Own Game. In the 23 matches, England had scored a total of 118 goals and conceded 26, but had withdrawn from FIFA in 1928.

Though England were achieving positive results, their performances were attracting the attention of critics such as James Catton, who wrote in Athletic News in 1923 that "unless players get out of the rut into which they have fallen, the game will lose its popularity and Great Britain her fame". Gabriel Hanot of L'Equipe saw threats to the English dominance from further afield, describing England as "farm horses" compared to the Uruguayan "Arab thoroughbreds". In his book The Anatomy of England: A History in Ten Matches, writer Jonathan Wilson describes England's lack of development as "institutional insularity". Brian Glanville attributed it to the structure of the English league system, saying the possibility of relegation was the cause of conservatism and negativity within the English game, while Willy Meisl blamed an unimaginative interpretation of tactics. Arsenal forward Cliff Bastin was critical of the selection committee, saying they were "not particularly intelligent" as they favoured the talent of the individual rather than how they fit into the team. A 1930 editorial in Athletic News highlighted the issue of player turnover, with 145 players selected for Home Nations Championship fixtures since the end of World War I. JM Freeman of the Daily Mail noted the "inferiority" of England's performance in finishing bottom of the 1927–28 British Home Championship, in comparison to Scotland who finished third having defeated England 5–1 at Wembley.

Spain had played their first international match in 1920, less than nine years prior to the fixture with England, taking part in the 1920 Olympics where they faced Denmark in the opening match; a goal from Patricio Arabolaza secured a 1–0 victory, though it was goalkeeper Ricardo Zamora who was Spain's key player in the match, particularly late on when injuries meant they had to finish the match with 10 players. Spain were managed by José María Mateos, a former journalist and manager of Athletic Bilbao who had been part a management trio taking charge of Spain since 1922, and had taken sole charge of the team following a 7–1 defeat to Italy at the 1928 Olympics, In contrast to England's stubborn approach towards foreign football, the Spanish held the English in high esteem and their football heritage was treated with great reverence; several Spanish football clubs used English terminology in their names, and many coaches of the teams were from England; Athletic referred to England as "la madre del fútbol" (the mother of football). Such was the profile of the fixture within Spain, it was the first football match to be publicly broadcast via radio, and it was said by Mundo Deportivo to be a "giant, transcendental step" for Spain to playing against England, and that a victory would see their "prestige consolidated throughout the world".

=== Pre-match ===
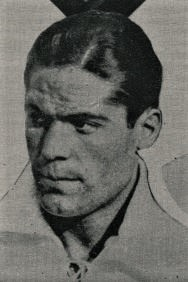
Spain striker Gaspar Rubio scored seven goals in the two matches played before England

In May 1929, England had already achieved big victories over France and Belgium, winning 4–1 and 5–1 respectively, their allies in World War I who they had begun playing on a near-annual basis. The committee who selected England's players chose the same team for all three matches, changing only two players from the starting lineup of England's last competitive fixture against Scotland in April, namely defenders Tom Cooper and Ernie Blenkinsop coming into the team. England's performance against France was deemed poor, with newspaper the Daily Sketch saying they "lacked speed and will have to play better if they are to beat Spain". Committee member Phil Bach told the Spanish press they had not been happy with the performance. During the match against Belgium, striker George Camsell, who had dislodged Dixie Dean from the team, scored four goals but picked up an injury which would rule him out of the match against Spain; Sporting Life said it was a "distinct loss".

It was the first meeting between the two countries; overall, it was Spain's 33rd international fixture, and England's 167th. It was to be the first Spain match played at the Estadio Metropolitano in Madrid, with tickets priced between 5 and 22 pesetas, which sold out two days in advance. The stadium, which was opened in 1923, was the home of Atlético Madrid from its inauguration until 1966. Mateos surprisingly opted not to select any players from Barcelona despite their being crowned inaugural La Liga champions a month later. The professionalism of football in Spain had brought an upturn in results and performances internationally; in March they defeated Portugal 5–0 in Seville, and achieved a bigger victory against France than England had achieved, winning 8–1 in Zaragoza, with Gaspar Rubio scoring a hat-trick against Portugal and four against France, and Rubio told Royal Spanish Football Federation president Pedro Díaz de Ribera that he should be paid a bonus for each goal he scored against England. Half-back José María Peña was the first professional footballer in Spain, and was a key proponent of the Spain team throughout the 1920s. The Spain squad and Mateos had been preparing since February for the three fixtures due to be played.

== Match ==
=== Team selection ===
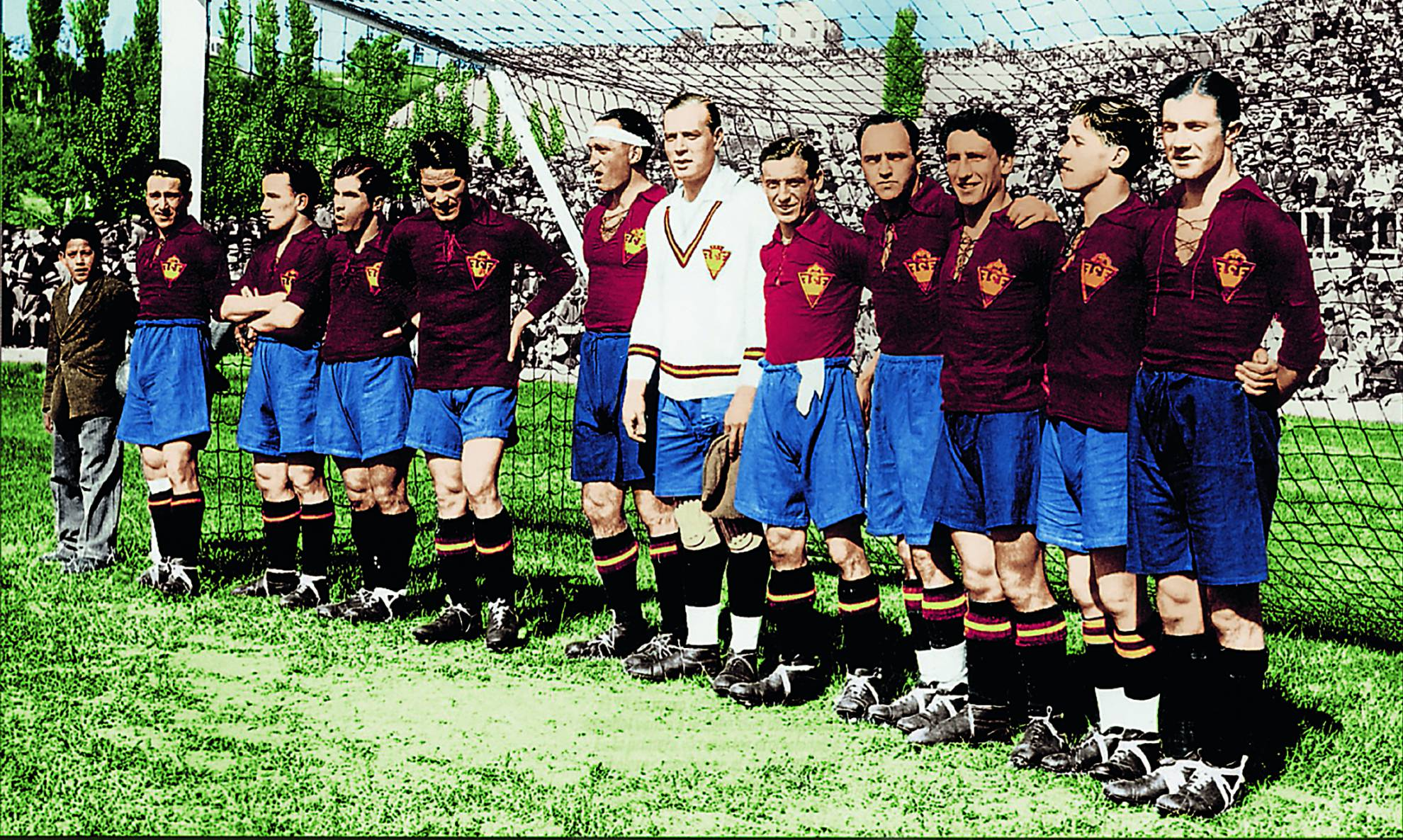
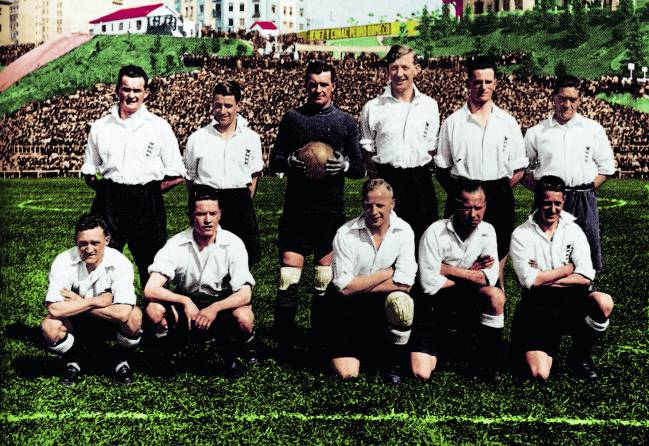
Spain (top) and England starting lineups

Spain's starting lineup had an average age of 24.5 years, and were captained by goalkeeper Zamora, with Félix Quesada and Jacinto Quincoces in defence. In the middle was Martín Marculeta, with half-backs Peña and Pachuco Prats, in for Paco Bienzobas as Spain's only change from the France match. The attacking five players for Spain consisted of José Padrón and Severiano Goiburu, the teams' only amateur player, behind centre-forward Rubio, who was flanked by left winger Mariano Yurrita and right winger Jaime Lazcano. Mateos had given 10 players their first international cap across the two previous matches, but no new débutants were announced for the England match. Alongside Mateos on the coaching team was Atlético Madrid manager Fred Pentland, who revolutionised the way many clubs in Spain played football and is regarded as the first great coach in the country, moving from the English-style kick-and-rush to a style focused on "skill, bravery in possession, short passing and quick movement".

England's starting lineup, selected by an FA committee, had an average age of 28.9 years, and consisted of goalkeeper Ted Hufton behind a defensive pairing of Blenkinsop and Cooper, with Joe Peacock and Fred Kean at wing-half either side of Jack Hill, who was captaining England for what would be the sixth and final time. In the English attack, Joe Carter and Edgar Kail were positioned behind an attacking trio of outside left Leonard Barry and outside right Hugh Adcock, either side of centre forward Joe Bradford. Bradford was a surprise selection to the Spanish, who were expecting Dean to come back into the team to replace the injured Camsell. Both teams used a 2–3–5 formation.

=== Summary ===
The match was refereed by Belgian John Langenus, considered the best referee in the world at the time, and who would referee the first World Cup Final in 1930. Spain won the coin toss and chose for England to play the first half "into the winds with the sun at their backs". The match kicked off at 17:00 GMT in front of a crowd of what was officially estimated at 45,000, but believed to be more, though Wilson writes that the match commenced at 17:05 GMT as the Spain players were late out. The first chance went Spain's way, their left-winger Yurrita hitting the post early on. Though accounts differ as to the precise minutes and scorers of the opening goals, England's right-winger Adcock set up two English goals in quick succession, using skill to beat a defender before centring the ball on both occasions; the Spanish media reported that inside-forward Carter and centre forward Bradford scored the goals, while the consensus among the English press was that Carter had scored both goals. Unbeknown to everybody but himself, Spain goalkeeper Zamora injured his sternum when he accidentally collided with his own teammate, the halfback Peña, in the build-up to the first goal. Though England were clearly the superior side, they dropped their guard, and in quick succession Spain scored twice, first through a header from centre forward Rubio, and then a 25-yard strike from right-winger Lazcano to go into the half-time break level at 2–2, the latter goal described by English newspaper The Times simply as "a brilliant shot".

The break had helped England, and they began dominating possession, eventually scoring a third goal in approximately the 73rd minute, when Adcock was fouled inside the penalty area and Carter scored his second of the match from the resulting penalty kick, though The Times reported that England's third was scored by halfback Hill following a clearance by England's goalkeeper Hufton. "With the game drawing to a close England looked like good winners", reported Sporting Life, however amidst a "patriotic and electrifying atmosphere", Spain equalised again in the 80th minute, with Rubio scoring his second of the match with a powerful header, after good teamwork from Lazcano and inside forward Goiburu on the right wing. The goal was immediately followed by a pitch invasion, the jubilant Spanish crowd lifting Rubio onto their shoulders in celebration. The Guardia Civil with swords emptied the pitch of the invaders and play resumed. Quickly thereafter, Goiburu scored to put Spain 4–3 in front, resulting in a second pitch invasion. With the pitch cleared again, Zamora and fullback Quesada prevented two England chances late on, ensuring a historic victory for Spain.

=== Details ===
15 May 1929
17:00 WEST (GMT+1)

Spain	4–3	England
Rubio 40', 80'; Lazcano 42'; Goiburu 82'	Report	Carter 15', 73' (pen.); Bradford 20'

Estadio Metropolitano, Madrid
Attendance: 45,000
Referee: John Langenus (Belgium)

Spain	England

GK	Ricardo Zamora (c)
FB	Félix Quesada
FB	Jacinto Quincoces
HB	Pachuco Prats
HB	Martín Marculeta
HB	José María Peña
RW	Jaime Lazcano
IF	Severiano Goiburu
CF	Gaspar Rubio
IF	José Padrón
LW	Mariano Yurrita
Manager:
(Spain) José María Mateos

GK	Ted Hufton
FB	Tom Cooper
FB	Ernie Blenkinsop
HB	Fred Kean
HB	Jack Hill (c)
HB	Joe Peacock
RW	Hugh Adcock
IF	Edgar Kail
CF	Joe Bradford
IF	Joe Carter
LW	Leonard Barry
Manager:
FA Selection Committee

== Aftermath ==
=== Press reaction ===
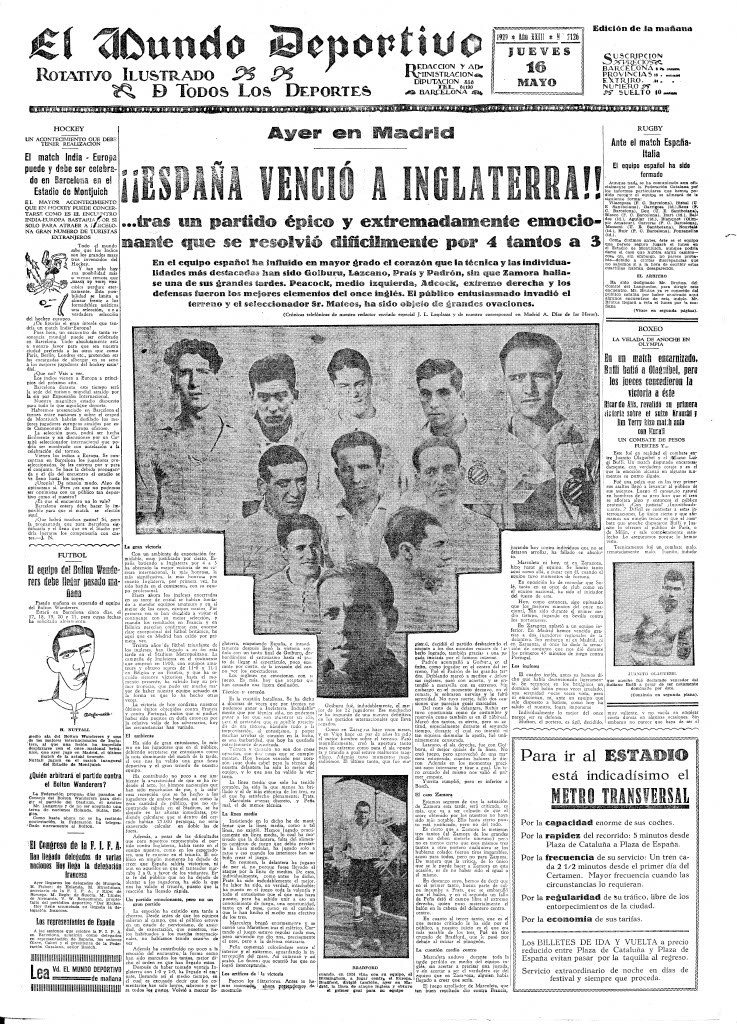
Mundo Deportivo's front page the following day

Despite turning out to be such a historic defeat, many in the British press hadn't travelled to Spain to report on the match, only a reporter from The Times known to be there, and in the ensuing days The Daily Mail and the Daily Mirror posted short reports, with The Guardian carrying no report. A correspondent from the Daily Express wrote; "I never thought I would live to see the day when 11 Spanish players humbled the might - more or less - of English soccer". Writing to Athletic News, a member of the FA praised the Spaniards as "very fast, and not lacking in skill and finesse". England captain Hill said that he was shocked by how well Spain had played, and that he was "really, really disappointed" in the outcome, but claimed the heat had handicapped his team.

In Spain, Mundo Deportivo said the win had been achieved through the heart of the players rather than their technique, and paid tribute to the performances of Boiburu, Lazcano, Prats, and Padron on the Spanish team, with praise also given to England's Peacock and Adcock. La Vanguardia polemicised that "if England can't offer more than this, then English football is in crisis". Spanish journalist Alfredo Relaño believes the former site of the ground should have a plaque memorialising the historic occasion and paying tribute to the 11 players. Spain captain Zamora refuted any claims of luck, saying his team had "roundly imposed itself in the second half and that was the key to our success".

=== Spain ===
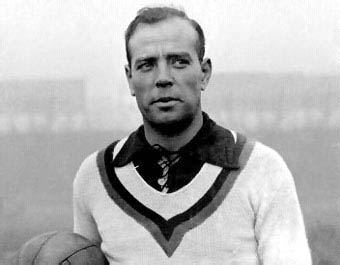
Ricardo Zamora, Spain's first international goalkeeper

Zamora was signed the following year by Real Madrid for 150k pesetas, becoming the highest paid player in Europe as a result. He was an integral part of the side which won their first La Liga championship in 1931–32, a season in which they were unbeaten, and conceded 17 goals the following season when they retained the title in 1932–33. Beginning in the 1950s, the 'Ricardo Zamora Trophy' would be awarded to the best goalkeeper in La Liga. Internationally, Zamora wouldn't feature in the inaugural FIFA World Cup in 1930, when Spanish clubs refused to allow their players to leave for an extended period of time, but was still the starting goalkeeper when Spain entered for the first time in 1934, with only Quincoces and Marculeta also remaining from the victory over England. Having defeated Brazil 3–1 in the first round, they came up against tournament hosts Italy. The teams played a violent and controversial match, with Italy receiving many favourable refereeing decisions, but the match finished 1–1, meaning a replay was played the following day which was won 1–0 by Italy in another match marred by controversy, following which referee René Mercet was banned for life. The match, and the tournament as a whole, would be subject to accusations of political interference from Prime Minister of Italy, Benito Mussolini.

Pentland would return to manage Athletic Bilbao soon after, and would win consecutive La Liga championships in 1929–30 and 1930–31. The clubs' unique Basque-only signing policy, which had only previously been hinted at by the clubs hierarchy, was solidified thanks to the success Pentland achieved with the club. Quincoces, the standout defender at the 1934 World Cup, would later successfully revolutionise the defensive tactical approach from the then-popular 2–3–5 in which he excelled, into the 4–2–4 and later the 4–4–2 formations when manager at Real Madrid and Valencia in the 1940s. The scorer of two of Spain's goals, Rubio, suddenly left the country in 1930 and went to Cuba, effectively ending his international career. 20 years after the match, he would say that the equaliser to make the game 3–3 was the goal that gave him most joy throughout his career. Despite his brief spell representing his country, in which he scored nine goals in four matches, he is considered amongst the best players in Spain's history by AS, alongside Zamora and Quincones.

=== England ===
With its false premium on rigid defence and the long pass, coaching became far more necessary, since such things as positional play and the art of ball control, neither indigenous to the type of game favoured by most British clubs, suddenly appeared no more than marginal. Since there were virtually no club coaches to keep these arts alive, it was inevitable that they should decline.

— Brian Glanville writing retrospectively about the downturn of English football in the early 1930s.

The match would be the final cap for seven of the England lineup - Hufton, Kean, Hill, Peacock, Kail, Carter, and Barry never played for their country again. Kail, who played his club football for Dulwich Hamlet, was the last non-league player to represent England. England made no immediate attempt at reconciliation with FIFA, not returning to the fold until 1946, and rejected the invitation to compete in the 1930 World Cup, which lead the British Press Association to refer to the tournament mockingly as the "so-called World’s Association Football Championship". With the rest of the world now catching up to England, they were being sought out for friendlies on a regular basis, failing to defeat both Austria and Germany in 1930, the match against the former directly lead to the FA stating they were "not in favour of granting permission to alien players to be brought into this country" when Arsenal attempted to sign goalkeeper Rudi Hiden, and the International Football Association Board wrote it into law the following year.

Things got worse the following year when losing to France 5–2 in 1931 (described by German sports magazine Kicker as being "like a bombshell over the continent"), but defeated the Austria Wunderteam 4–3 in 1932, a result seen as fortunate for England, and though Austria's English manager Jimmy Hogan said that while his compatriots were still the best natural talents, he believed their lack of coaching and training was letting them down. England were ruled out as potential hosts for the next World Cup, with Italy chosen by FIFA; subsequently, it was Italy who were the next team to ask for a friendly against England, with the teams settling for a 1–1 draw in 1933 under the cloud of Mussolini's fascist reign. FA secretary Frederick Wall would reject an offer from the Italian Football Federation to have all expenses covered in exchange for entering the tournament, and Charles Sutcliffe said the Home Nations Championship "was a far more representative World Championship than what is taking place in Rome".

== Rematch ==
English representatives felt that the match had been played under extreme heat and on a dry pitch, so at a farewell banquet following the match, Stanley Rous requested a rematch with Spain. With the return match to be played at Highbury on 9 December 1931, the Spanish contingent travelled to London early, arriving on 4 December and watching a league match between West Ham United and Everton the following day, during which they witnessed England striker Dixie Dean in action, and were introduced to the fans at half-time to a good ovation. Spain would be only the second foreign team to play in England, with Belgium being the other on two prior occasions. According to Wilson, Zamora was unsettled by the refusal of the federation to allow players' partners to accompany them on the trip.

Captained by Blenkinsop, who was still accompanied in the defence by Cooper, England would emerge victorious by a score of 7–1; in addition to a goal from Dean, his last for England, there were two goals each scored by Sammy Crooks, Jack Smith and Tommy Johnson, and Spain's consolation came in the 87th minute from Guillermo Gorostiza, a "low, stinging drive" going past England goalkeeper Harry Hibbs. The defeat remains the heaviest ever suffered by Spain, and was one of the worst games of Zamora's international career.

== See also ==
- 1949 England v Ireland football match
