= 1929 FA Charity Shield =

| Professionals | Amateurs |
| 3 | 0 |
- Date: 7 October 1929
- Venue: The Den, New Cross, London, London
- Attendance: 6,000

The 1929 FA Charity Shield was the 16th FA Charity Shield, an annual football match. It was played between the Professionals and the Amateurs at The Den, New Cross in London on 7 October 1929. The Professionals won the match 3–0.

== Teams ==
| Professionals | Amateurs |
|---|---|
| GK – Olney (Aston Villa); DF – Thompson (Nottingham Forest); DF – Keeping (Southampton); DF – Barrett (Fulham); DF – Hart (Leeds); DF – Armitage (Stoke City); MF – Pease (Middlesbrough); FW – Seed (Sheffield Wednesday); FW – Chandler (Leicester City); FW – Davies (Huddersfield Town); FW – Williams (Arsenal); DF – Harrison (Nottingham Forest) (R); FW – Landells (Millwall) (R) | GK – Howard Baker (Corinthians); F. J. Gregory (Wimbledon); E. H. Gates (London Caledonians); G. C. Glennister (R.N.); A. H. Chadder (Corinthians); DF – J. G. Knight (Casuals); L. B. Morish (Dulwich Hamlet); FW – E. Kail (Dulwich Hamlet); FW – C. T. Ashton (Corinthians); FW – A. G. Doggart (Corinthians); MF – Lt. K. E. Hegan (Army); MF – F. H. Ewer (Casuals) (R); MF – H. L. Coates (R.N.) (R) |

== Match ==
The Professionals won 3–0 with goals from Seed, Chandler and Pease.
