= John Knight (footballer) =

English footballer

Personal information
- Full name: John George Knight
- Date of birth: 18 August 1902
- Place of birth: Edmonton, England
- Date of death: 1990 (aged 87–88)
- Position: Centre half

Senior career*
Years	Team	Apps	(Gls)
- Casuals
- Corinthian
1928	Tottenham Hotspur	1	(0)
- * Club domestic league appearances and goals

John George Knight (18 August 1902 – 1990) was an English footballer who played for Casuals, Corinthian and Tottenham Hotspur.

== Football career ==
He played for the "Amateurs" in the 1929 FA Charity Shield. After playing for the Casuals and the Corinthians, Knight joined Tottenham Hotspur. The centre half played one match in 1928 for the Spurs.

He was also the Head of the Chemistry Department at Haberdashers' Aske's Boys' School, Hampstead (then Elstree from 1961) where he used to tell his pupils that he was the last amateur to play for Spurs.
