= Campa de los Ingleses Park =

Former football venue in Bilbao

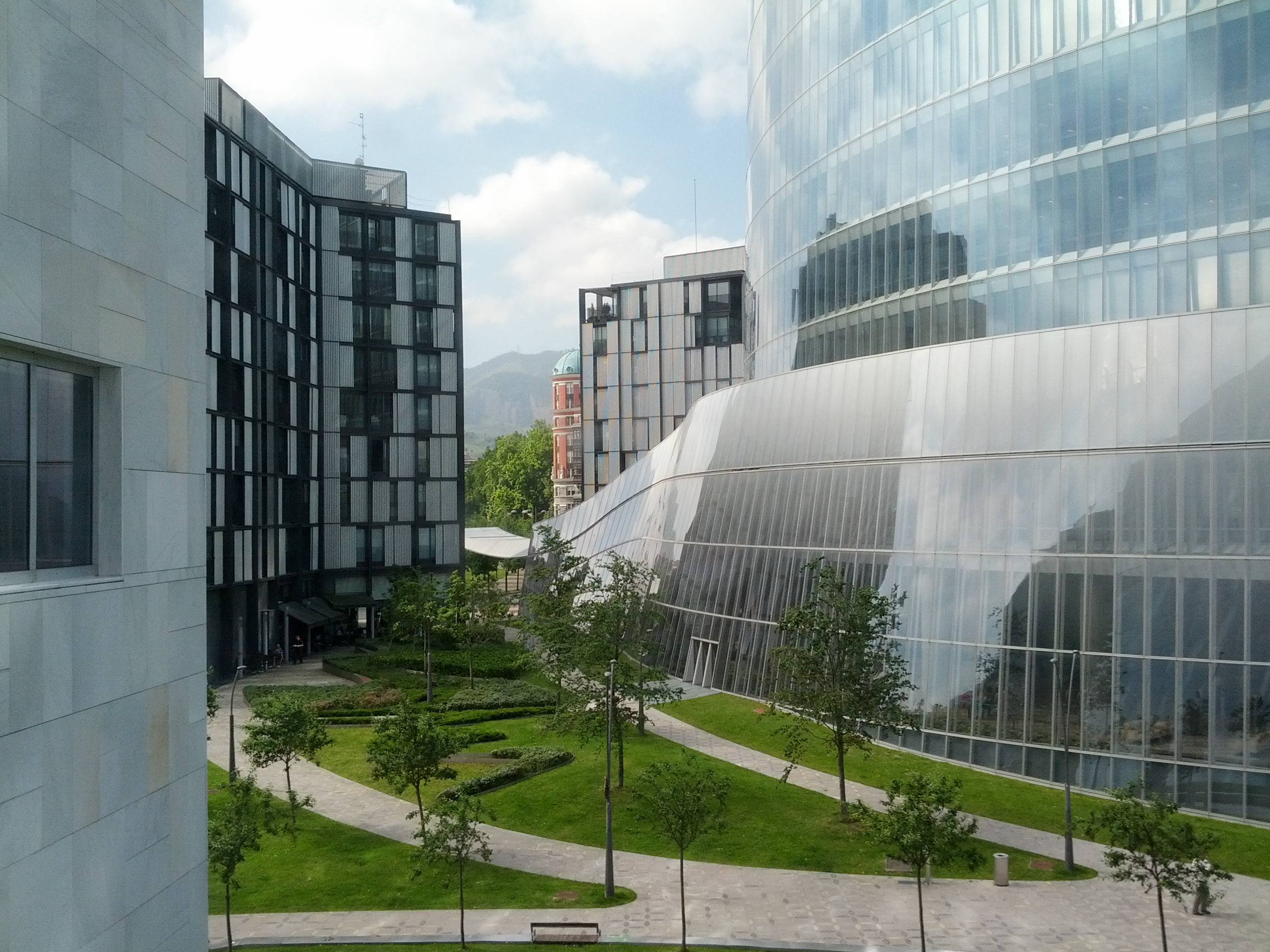
- Detail of the park at the bottom of the Iberdrola Tower.
- Interactive map of Campa de los Ingleses Park
- Type: Public park
- Location: Bilbao, Biscay, Spain
- Area: 24,580 m^{2} (264,600 sq ft)
- Created: 11 September 2011
- Status: Open year round

The Campa de los Ingleses park (Spanish: English Field Park), is a park in the capital of Biscay, Bilbao. It is located near the dock of the same name and the Guggenheim Museum Bilbao. The Campa de los Ingleses in Bilbao can be referring to three different enclaves: the old dock, the current park or the tavern at the San Mamés stadium.

It became known as La Campa de los Ingleses because this quay housed a British cemetery from the 17th century until 1908. In addition to the cemetery, the quay was at one point used as a runway for aeroplanes, but most importantly, it became a makeshift football pitch in the late 19th century. It was a common place of recreation for the British sailors who arrived in Bilbao on the MacAndrews ships. They used to play a sport called football, which was a source of pride for the people of Bilbao, until finally it made the locals take a liking to this sport.

== Origins ==
This ground was located on the quay that ran along the left bank of Nervión. It became known as La Campa de los Ingleses because this quay housed a British cemetery from the 17th century until 1908, when the City Council ordered it to be closed for reasons of health and also morality, since being a secluded place, there were numerous couples who came there to have their moment of privacy.

== Football pitch ==
=== Beginnings ===
Modern football was introduced to the Basque Country in the late 19th century by a combination of mostly British immigrant workers, visiting sailors, and Spanish students returning from Britain. At the time, Bilbao was the home of an important industrial area with iron mines and shipyards nearby, and indeed, it was the British employees of the Nervión Shipyards, located in Sestao (Vizcaya), who organized and played the first known football match in the region, which was held at La Campa de los Ingleses on 4 April 1890, between the Machinery Department (engineers) and the Shipyard Workers, ending in an 8–1 to the former. This group of football pioneers were part of a multi-sports club called Club Atleta, which had been founded in late 1889. This ground thus became a common place of recreation for British workers, and also for sailors who arrived in Bilbao on the MacAndrews ships, playing several sports there, but especially to the practice of football, a sport practically unknown in the city at the time.

=== Golden age ===
As Club Atleta had no rivals in the city, the only matches they played against other teams were the ones where they faced English sailors who came to Bilbao in MacAndrews ships or crews of English ships who had set sail from Portsmouth and Southampton carrying miners, engineers and coal from the north-east of England. These miners, who had only seen the sea for the previous week, were desperate to leave the ships and find a patch of grass to play their favorite sports. The ships would enter the estuary of the Nervión river and dock next to the iron factories of the Nervión shipbuilding yards, not too far away from La Campa de los Ingleses, which hosted the first matches between Club Atleta and those crews of English ships, usually played on Sundays.

=== Decline and collapse ===
By 1892 the sheer quantity of Englishmen playing football on La Campa de los Ingleses forced them to seek another pitch that could properly accommodate the growing population of Brits, and so, in November 1892, the president of Club Atleta, Enrique Jones Bird, asked for permission to play in the Hippodrome of Lamiako. Permission was duly granted and the racetrack became the new home of organized football in Viscaya. It was from Lamiako that the sport of football took off in Bilbao, with several Bilbainos swarming the field to watch the teams of British workers challenge each other every weekend.

== Park ==
The design of this park was the subject of an Ideas Contest held in 2007 and won by the team formed by landscape designer Diana Balmori and RTN Arquitectos, who presented a project called "Campa 2000". Balmori had been the co-author of the Abandoibarra Master Plan and responsible for the Plaza de Euskadi project just a few months earlier. The park was finally inaugurated on 11 September 2011.

On this very place on 29 April 2011, the Bilbao City Council and Athletic Club put up a plaque commemorating that it was the place where Bilbao's football fandom was born and which gave birth to the Athletic Club. It explains how sailors would throw rocks into the river to create waves so they could retrieve the ball when it was hit into the water. It is a reminder of the journey football has taken in Bilbao, going from riverbank fields to 53,000-seater stadiums in a space of just around 140 years. The following verses of the writer and poet Kirmen Uribe are visible on the plaque:

INGELESEN LANDA 1898-1901

Athletic Zelairik Zelai (1/6)

Hementxe jolasten omen zuten ingelesek.
Hementxe, ibai ondoko zelaian.
Orduan larreak baino ez ziren eta hilerri txiki bat
Batzuetan, baloia ibaira erortzen zen
eta haren bila joan beharra zegoen.
Urrun bazen, harritxoak jaurti behar ziren
lehorrera hurbil zedin.
Harritxoek uhinak sortzen zituzten,
gutxinaka handituz zihoazen olatuak.
Eta horrela, Athletic Lamiakon hasi zen jolasten,
eta Jolasetan, eta, ondotik, San Mamesen.
Olatu bat, eta beste bat, eta beste bat.

— Kirmen Uribe in April 2011

ENGLISH FIELD 1898-1901

Athletic Field (1/6)

It is said that the English played here.
Right here, in the field next to the river.
Back then there were only pastures and a small cemetery.
Sometimes, the ball fell into the river
and you had to go look for it.
If it was far, pebbles had to be thrown
to bring it closer to land.
The pebbles created waves,
the waves gradually increased in size.
And thus, Athletic started to play in Lamiako,
and Jolaseta, and then in San Mames.
A wave, and another, and another.

— Kirmen Uribe in April 2011

== Interesting buildings ==
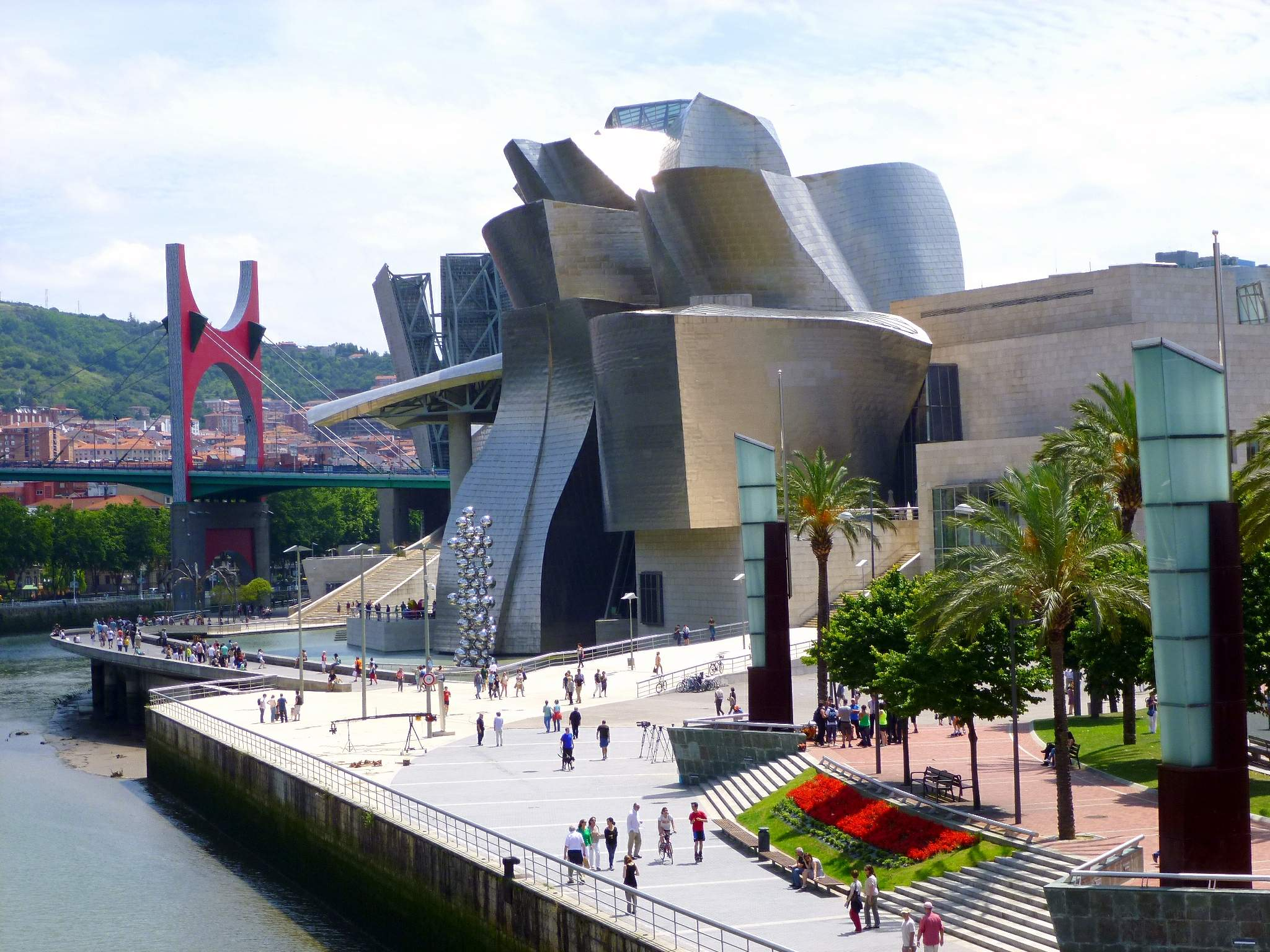
La Salve Bridge, Guggenheim Museum Bilbao and confluence of the Campa de los Ingleses and Evaristo Churruca docks.

With a total area of 24,580 square meters, it occupies the space between the vicinity of the Guggenheim Museum Bilbao and the Deusto bridge and surrounds the new buildings of Abandoibarra, such as the Library of the University of Deusto, the Auditorium of the University of the Basque Country and the Iberdrola Tower, among others.

Of the total area, 10,123 square meters correspond to the section between Abandoibarra Avenue, Alameda de Mazarredo, and Ramón Rubial Street, while the space between the latter and the Deusto bridge occupies the remaining 14,457 square meters.

- Guggenheim Museum Bilbao
- La Salve bridge
- Abandoibarra avenue
- Evaristo Churruka Quay

== Transportation ==
This area is mainly connected by the Bilbao Tramway, where there are several EuskoTran line A stations:

- Guggenheim station
