= Leonard Graham =

English cricketer and footballer

Len Graham
Personal information
- Full name: Leonard Graham
- Date of birth: 20 August 1901
- Place of birth: Leyton, England
- Date of death: 21 December 1962 (aged 61)
- Position: Left half

Senior career*
Years	Team	Apps	(Gls)
- Capworth United
- Leytonstone
1923–1933	Millwall	313	(8)

International career
1925	Football League XI		
1925	England	2	(0)
- * Club domestic league appearances and goals

Leonard Graham (20 August 1901 – 21 December 1962) was an English footballer and first-class cricketer.

== Football career ==
Graham made over 300 appearances in the Football League for Millwall. He won two caps for England at international level and also represented the Football League XI.

== Cricket career ==
Graham was a right-handed batsman who played first-class cricket for Essex. A lower-order batsman, Graham made two appearances for Essex during the 1926 season, scoring a total of 14 runs.

== Coaching ==
In 1935, he replaced Syd Puddefoot as an FA instructor to Kent Secondary Schoolboys.
