= Jack Landells =

English footballer

Personal information
- Date of birth: 20 November 1904
- Place of birth: Gateshead, County Durham, England
- Date of death: 1960 (aged 55–56)
- Height: 5 ft 9 in (1.75 m)
- Position: Forward

Senior career*
Years	Team	Apps	(Gls)
- Grays Athletic
1925–1933	Millwall	175	(69)
1933–1934	West Ham United	21	(4)
1934–1935	Bristol City		
1935–1936	Carlisle United		
1936–1937	Walsall		
1937–1938	Clapton Orient		
1938–1939	Chelmsford City		
- * Club domestic league appearances and goals

John Landells (11 November 1904 – 1960) was an English footballer who played as a forward.

Born in Gateshead, County Durham, Landells played for Grays Athletic, Millwall, West Ham United, Bristol City, Carlisle United, Walsall, Clapton Orient and Chelmsford City. He signed for Millwall from amateur Essex club Grays Athletic . He played eight years for Millwall, from 1925 to 1933 where he scored a total of 71 goals in 184 appearances in all competitions. He is Millwall's eighth all-time leading scorer. He played for the "Professionals" in the 1929 FA Charity Shield. He left in the summer of 1933 to join their rivals West Ham. He only played with them for a season, scoring four goals in 22 games. He left to join Bristol City, where he enjoyed FA Cup giant killing success in his first season, when they knocked Portsmouth out in the Fourth Round.
