= Tommy Gale (footballer, born 1895) =

English footballer

Personal information
- Full name: Thomas Gale
- Date of birth: 12 October 1895
- Place of birth: Castleford, England
- Date of death: 1976 (aged 80–81)
- Height: 5 ft 10 in (1.78 m)
- Position: Goalkeeper

Senior career*
Years	Team	Apps	(Gls)
1920	Castleford Town		
1921	Harrogate		
1922–1930	Barnsley	269	(0)
1931–1933	Stockport County	57	(0)
1933	Denaby United		
- * Club domestic league appearances and goals

Thomas Gale (12 October 1895 – 1976) was an English footballer who played for Barnsley and Stockport County.
