= Frank Hartley (footballer) =

English footballer

Personal information
- Date of birth: 20 July 1896
- Place of birth: Shipton-under-Wychwood, England
- Date of death: 20 October 1965 (aged 69)
- Position: Inside forward

Senior career*
Years	Team	Apps	(Gls)
1922	Oxford City		
1922	Tottenham Hotspur	1	(0)
	Corinthian		(? caps4 = 6)
1927–1929	Tottenham Hotspur		(1)

International career
1923	England	1	(0)
- * Club domestic league appearances and goals

Frank Hartley (20 July 1896 – 20 October 1965) was an English professional footballer who played for Oxford City, Tottenham Hotspur, Corinthian and represented England at international level.

== Football career ==
Hartley began his career at Oxford City before joining Tottenham Hotspur in 1922 and played in one match. After a spell with the Corinthians, the inside forward re-joined the Spurs to go on and make a further six appearances and scoring once between 1927 and 1929.

== International career ==
Hartley made one appearance for England in a friendly against France on 10 May 1923 while still technically an Oxford City player, making him the club's only England international to date.
