= Pedro Escartín =

Spanish footballer, referee, coach, journalist and author

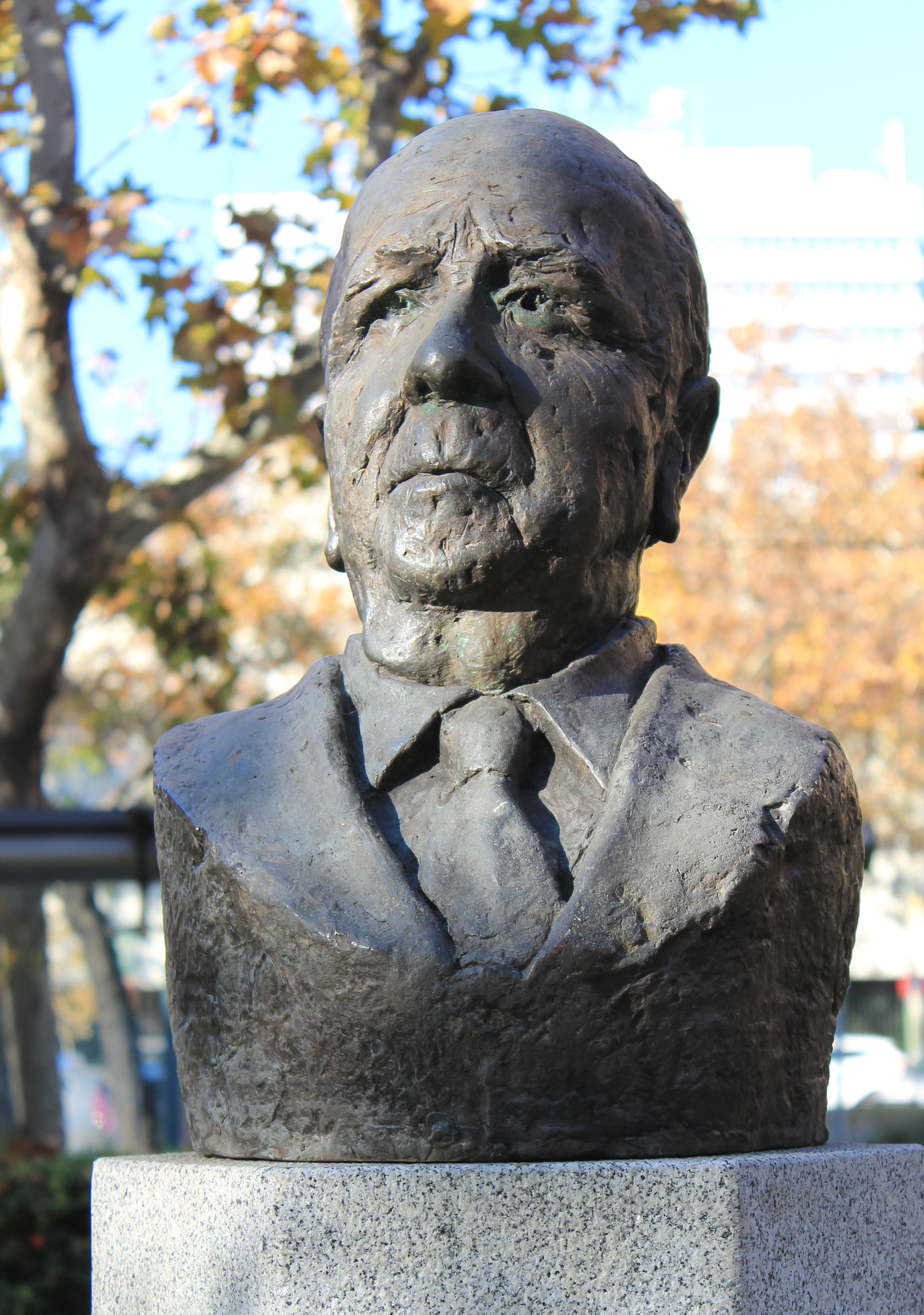
Bronze bust of Pedro Escartín in Madrid (Spain)

Pedro Escartín Morán (8 August 1902 – 21 May 1998) was a Spanish football player, referee, coach, journalist and author.

He was an international referee from 1928 to 1948, and a member of the FIFA Disciplinary Committee for 27 years. He also went on to manage the Spain national football team in two different tenures. He was also a journalist in Spain for most of his life, and is a well-respected figure of the sport in Spain in the 20th century.

== Career as referee ==
Born in Madrid, Spain, Escartin played as a youngster at the club Real Sociedad Gimnástica Española during the beginnings of professionalism in Spanish football. He had to abandon playing in 1923 due to a pleural illness.

He began officiating football matches in 1924, and in 1928, he participated in his first international match, being in charge of the 1928 Olympic tournament semifinal between Argentina and Egypt. He participated at the 1934 World Cup, appearing in four matches as a linesman (assistant referee), and being the first Spanish referee to participate in a World Cup. He went on to become one of the most prestigious referees in Spain and Europe in the 1930s and 1940s. His last international match was a friendly between Italy and England in 1948, year in which he retired from refereeing.

He became a member of the FIFA Disciplinary Committee in 1940, remaining at that role for 27 years. He was also President of the Spanish Colegio Nacional de Arbitros (the national referees association) from 1952 to 1961.

== Coaching career ==
Escartín's first tenure in charge of the Spain national football team was from 1952 to 1953 – succeeding Ricardo Zamora – and his second one in 1961, the latter involving all four matches of the 1962 World Cup qualification campaign (of which Spain won three and drew one). After helping Spain qualify to its third World Cup finals appearance and its first since 1950, Escartin ended his second period as national coach, as previously arranged, on 31 December 1961. His overall record as Spain's coach included 7 wins, 3 draws and 2 losses in 12 matches.

== Journalism ==
Having begun his works in journalism in 1920, Escartín combined them with his activities as player, referee, and coach; in 1961, he became a full-time journalist, and worked for different agencies such as Heraldo de Madrid, El Alcázar, Pueblo, La Prensa, and Marca, among others. He wrote books, essays, and thousands of articles about football for newspapers and other publications. His Reglamento de Fútbol Asociación / comentarios y aclaraciones por Pedro Escartín Morán (Rules of Association Football with comments and clarifications) from 1941 remains to date an authoritative source.

== Trivia ==
The stadium of CD Guadalajara in Guadalajara, Spain was named after him.
