= Ernest Coleman (physicist) =

American physicist

Ernest Coleman (August 31, 1941 - January 17, 1990) was an American physicist working in the study, testing, and theory of sub-atomic particles. He was a professor of physics at the University of Minnesota who held a Ph.D. in physics from the University of Michigan.

== Early life and education ==
Coleman was born on August 31, 1941, in Detroit, Michigan to parents James and Grace Coleman. His parents were originally from Alabama. He gained his Bachelor of Science and Master of Science from the University of Michigan in 1963 and his Ph.D. in physics from the University of Michigan in 1966. Coleman was a member of Phi Beta Kappa. Coleman completed a one-year postdoctoral fellowship at the DESY research facility in Hamburg, Germany.

== Career ==
After completing his postdoctoral fellowship, Coleman went on to obtain a position as an associate professor of physics at the University of Minnesota. In 1974 he was employed as a researcher by the United States Federal Government. That same year, Coleman was promoted to head of the Atomic Energy Commission's central laboratory research section within their division of physical research. His contributions to physics were related to the understanding of nucleon interactions at high energies.

Coleman was active in education, working as director of the SLAC Summer Science Program from 1971 to 1984. He was president of the National Society of Black Physicists (NSBP) from 1984-1986. He also received the Sloan Research Fellowship in 1973 and the Distinguished Service Award of the American Association of Physics Teachers in 1977. In 1976, he was honored as an American Physical Society (APS) Fellow.

== Research ==
Coleman worked on experiments conducted at the Cosmotron at Brookhaven National Laboratory and the Zero Gradient Synchrotron at Argonne National Laboratory. There, he studied how protons and mesons scattered from deuterium and hydrogen targets. As a result of Coleman's experiments testing the one-nucleon exchange model, a correction to Roy J. Glauber's scattering theory was discovered.
