= Fred Ewer =

English footballer (1898–1971)

Personal information
- Full name: Frederick Harold Ewer
- Date of birth: 30 September 1898
- Place of birth: West Ham, England
- Date of death: 29 January 1971 (aged 72)
- Place of death: Chelmsford, England
- Position: Wing half

Senior career*
Years	Team	Apps	(Gls)
- Corinthian
- Casuals

International career
1924	England	2	(0)
- * Club domestic league appearances and goals

Frederick Harold Ewer (30 September 1898 – 29 January 1971) was an English international footballer, who played as a wing half.

== Career ==
Born in West Ham, Ewer played for Corinthian in the 1927 FA Charity Shield, where they lost against Cardiff City. He also played for Casuals, and earned two caps for England in 1928. He played for the "Amateurs" in the 1929 FA Charity Shield.
