= Charlie Hannaford (footballer) =

English footballer

Charles Hannaford (8 January 1896 – July 1970) was an English footballer who played as a forward. Born in Finsbury Park, London, he played for Maidstone United, Millwall, Charlton Athletic, Clapton Orient, and Manchester United.
