= Charlie Spencer =

English footballer (1899–1953)

Personal information
- Full name: Charles William Spencer
- Date of birth: 4 December 1899
- Place of birth: Washington, England
- Date of death: 9 February 1953 (aged 53)
- Place of death: York, England
- Height: 5 ft 10 in (1.78 m)
- Position: Full-back

Youth career
- Glebe Rovers (Washington)
- Washington Chemical Works

Senior career*
Years	Team	Apps	(Gls)
1921–1928	Newcastle United	161	(8)
1928–1930	Manchester United	46	(0)
1930–1932	Tunbridge Wells Rangers	?	(?)
1932–1937	Wigan Athletic		

International career
1924–1925	England	2	(0)

Managerial career
- 1932–1937: Wigan Athletic (player-manager)
- 1937–1951: Grimsby Town
- 1951–1952: Hastings United
- 1952–1953: York City
- * Club domestic league appearances and goals

Charles William Spencer (4 December 1899 – 9 February 1953) was an English football player and manager.

== Club career ==
After service with the Royal Engineers during the First World War, Spencer joined Newcastle United from non-league football in October 1921. He played for the club until 1928, making a total of 175 appearances and scored one goal.

In January 1928, Spencer signed for Manchester United, and was given the captaincy upon his arrival. However, he was only there for 18 months, leaving the club for Tunbridge Wells Rangers in 1929, to become a player-coach at the Kent-based side. He then moved to Wigan Athletic, where he became the club's first ever manager.

== International career ==
Spencer played twice for England. His first game was against Scotland on 12 April 1924 and his second, and last, cap came against Wales on 28 February 1925.

== Managerial career ==
Spencer became Wigan Athletic's first ever manager in August 1932. During his first four seasons at the club, he won the Cheshire County League Championship three times.

He left Wigan in March 1937 to become manager of Grimsby Town. Grimsby were then playing in the First Division and narrowly avoided relegation at the end of the 1937–38 season.

The following season, Spencer had assembled a fine squad, including former Liverpool centre forward Fred Howe, Jimmy Boyd (who had won the FA Cup with Newcastle United in 1932) and Tommy Jones from Blackpool. Grimsby performed far better in the league, finishing in tenth place in the table, whilst in the FA Cup, they reached the semi-final against Wolverhampton Wanderers, having defeated fellow First Division team Chelsea in the previous round. The semi-final was played at Old Trafford on 25 March 1939 in front of a crowd of 76,962 spectators; this remains the record attendance at Old Trafford. In the semi-final, Grimsby were no match for Wolves and were "simply swept aside", going down 5–0.

He was appointed as manager of York City in November 1952. However, he died less than three months into his reign at the club on 9 February 1953 at his home in Blackpool.

== Managerial statistics ==
Team	Nat	From	To	Record				
Team	Nat	From	To	G	W	L	D	Win %
Wigan Athletic	(England)	1 August 1932	30 April 1937	418	293	87	38	70%
Grimsby Town	(England)	1 May 1937	1 May 1951	326	102	148	76	31.28
York City	(England)	1 November 1952	1 February 1953	13	5	5	3	38.46

== Honours ==
Newcastle United

- FA Cup: 1923–24
