= Harry Hardy =

English footballer

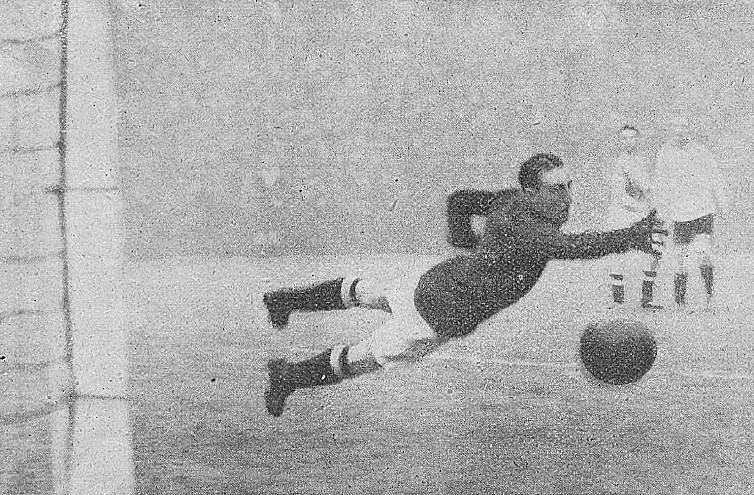

Personal information
- Full name: Henry Hardy
- Date of birth: 14 January 1895
- Place of birth: Stockport, England
- Date of death: 17 February 1969 (aged 74)
- Height: 5 ft 9 1/2 in (1.77 m)
- Position: Goalkeeper

Senior career*
Years	Team	Apps	(Gls)
1918–1925	Stockport County	207	(0)
1925–1929	Everton	40	(0)
1929–????	Bury	27	(0)

International career
1924	England	1	(0)
- * Club domestic league appearances and goals

Henry Hardy (14 January 1895 – 17 February 1969) was an English footballer who played as a goalkeeper. Born in Stockport in 1895, played for his hometown club, Stockport County, and Everton and Bury. He made 207 league appearances for Stockport, and is regarded as one of the greatest players in the club's history. He was the first, and as of November 2026, only Stockport player to win an England cap.

Hardy made his professional debut against Cardiff City on 4 September 1920, conceding three goals. He then went on the make 170 consecutive appearances for Stockport before he missed his first game for the club, a 1–1 draw with Southampton on 11 October 1924, due to his involvement with the Football League representative team.

When Stockport won the 1921–22 Third Division North title, Hardy was an ever-present member of the side, conceding just 21 goals, a club record. He also kept 23 clean sheets in 38 appearances, including 20 in the first 27 matches. His record of 755 consecutive minutes without conceding a goal stood as a Stockport goalkeeping record until it was broken by Wayne Hennessey 85 years later.
