= George Armitage (footballer) =

English footballer (1898–1936)

Personal information
- Full name: George Henry Armitage
- Date of birth: 17 January 1898
- Place of birth: Stoke Newington, England
- Date of death: 28 August 1936 (aged 38)
- Place of death: Aylesford, Kent, England
- Position: Defender

Senior career*
Years	Team	Apps	(Gls)
- St Saviour's
- Wimbledon
1923–1929	Charlton Athletic	165	(4)
- Leyton

International career
1924	England	1	(0)
- * Club domestic league appearances and goals

George Henry Armitage (17 January 1898 – 28 August 1936) was a footballer who played in The Football League for Charlton Athletic. He also made one appearance for England. He was born in Stoke Newington, England.
