= Bert Coleman =

English footballer (1889–1958)

Personal information
- Full name: Ernest Herbert Coleman
- Date of birth: 19 October 1889
- Place of birth: Steyning, England
- Date of death: 15 June 1958 (aged 68)
- Position: Goalkeeper

Senior career*
Years	Team	Apps	(Gls)
- Croydon Amateurs
1912–1925	Dulwich Hamlet		

International career
1921	England	1	(0)
- * Club domestic league appearances and goals

Ernest Herbert Coleman (19 October 1889 – 15 June 1958) was an English footballer, notable for making an appearance in 1921 with the England national side despite playing for non-league Dulwich Hamlet.
