= Manuel de Castro (journalist) =

Spanish sports journalist, manager, referee, and football executive

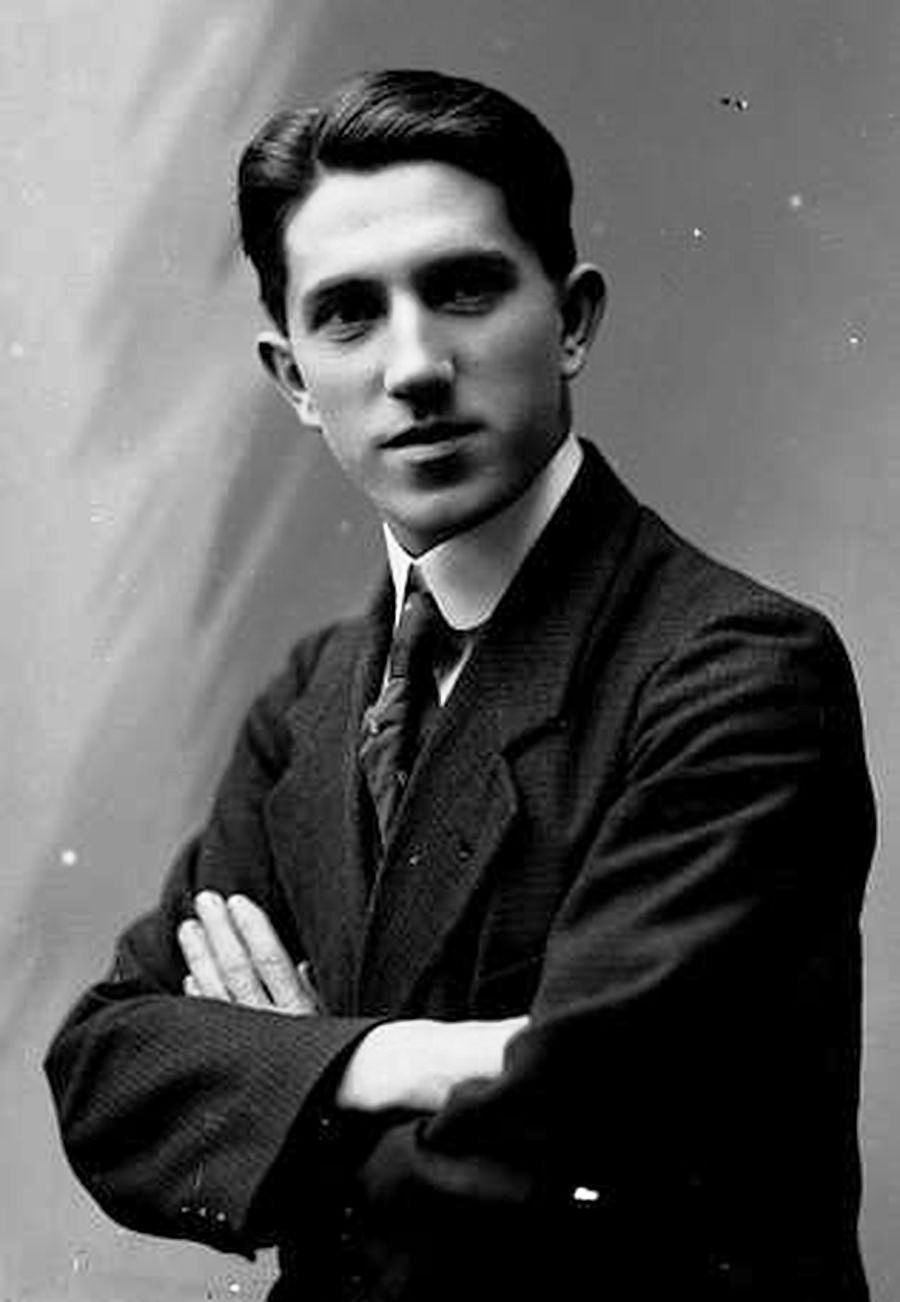
- De Castro circa 1919

President of the Galician Football Federation

Personal details
- Born: 9 August 1885 Vigo, Galicia, Spain
- Died: 27 August 1944 (aged 59) Vigo, Spain
Association football career
- Full name: Manuel de Castro González
- Position: Midfielder
Senior career*
Years	Team	Apps	(Gls)
1904–1907	Sporting de Vigo		
Managerial career
- 1921–1922; 1925–1927: Spain
- 1929–1930: Galicia
- * Club domestic league appearances and goals

Manuel de Castro González (Note: In this Spanish name, the first or paternal surname is Castro and the second or maternal family name is González.) (9 August 1885 – 27 August 1944), better known as Hándicap, was a Spanish sports journalist, football executive, manager, referee, and politician. He was one of the most important figures in the amateur beginnings of football in Vigo, being noted for his prominent role in promoting football in the city and as the fundamental head behind the foundation of Celta de Vigo in 1923.

As a football executive, he held the presidency of the Galician Football Federation. As a coach, he managed both the Spain national team in ten games between 1921 and 1927, as well as the Galicia national team. And as a referee, he founded the College of Arbitrators of Galicia. He also promoted athletics, of which he also served as president of the Galician Athletics Federation. He was a defensor of the idea of "complete athletes", people who dedicated themselves to more than one modality.

== Early years ==
Born in Vigo, he was one of the pioneers who began playing football in Vigo on the Malecón field in the early years of the 20th century. He began his journalist career as an editor for the Sprint newspaper, and already in 1909, he wrote in the magazine Letras y Deporte, the first sports magazine in Galicia, later moving on to Faro de Vigo (1912–1930), in which he became a fervent disseminator of sporting activity, signing his articles under the pseudonym Hándicap. He is thus considered "the dean" of sports reporters in Vigo. He also wrote for Vida Deportiva, the magazine where the first campaign in favor of building a stadium in Vigo appeared.

== Managerial career ==
In 1921 he began to carry out the functions of coach of the Spain national team, as part of a Selection Committee of Spain made up of Julián Ruete and José Berraondo, and the first match this Committee oversaw was a friendly against Belgium 9 October 1921, which was Spain's first-ever game after the Olympics as well as their first-ever game on home soil. This Committee was formed and reformed numerous times in its history, also partnering with the likes of Ezequiel Montero and Ricardo Cabot in 1925–27. He oversaw a total of 10 games, winning 9 of them, which results in a ratio of 0.90 wins per game, a national record still unmatched.

== Celta Vigo ==
He combined his work as national coach with the role of vice president of the Real Vigo Sporting, a position he used to promote, together with Juan Baliño and Pepe Bar, the idea of merging Sporting with his city rival Fortuna de Vigo, to achieve a more powerful team that could successfully compete against the likes of Real Madrid, FC Barcelona, and Athletic Bilbao. He began to work on the idea in the mid-1910s, which would fail in his first attempt in 1915, but this did not discourage him, and in his second attempt in 1923, he reached an agreement between the two sides; taking advantage of the fact that the Galician national team, a combination of the best players from Vigo, had reached the final of the 1922–23 Prince of Asturias Cup after beating the likes of the Centro team (a Castile/Madrid XI) by a score of 4–1, and despite losing the final, the Galicia fans were very pleased with the team's performance in the competition, thus welcoming with tremendous enthusiasm the idea proposed by Manuel de Castro, and hence, on 23 August 1923, Celta de Vigo was born.

== Later life ==
In 1924, with the help of his brother, the former football player and athlete Fernando de Castro, he founded the Galician Athletics Federation. In the following years, he would limit his activity to refereeing, even founding the Galician College of Arbitrators.

== Death ==
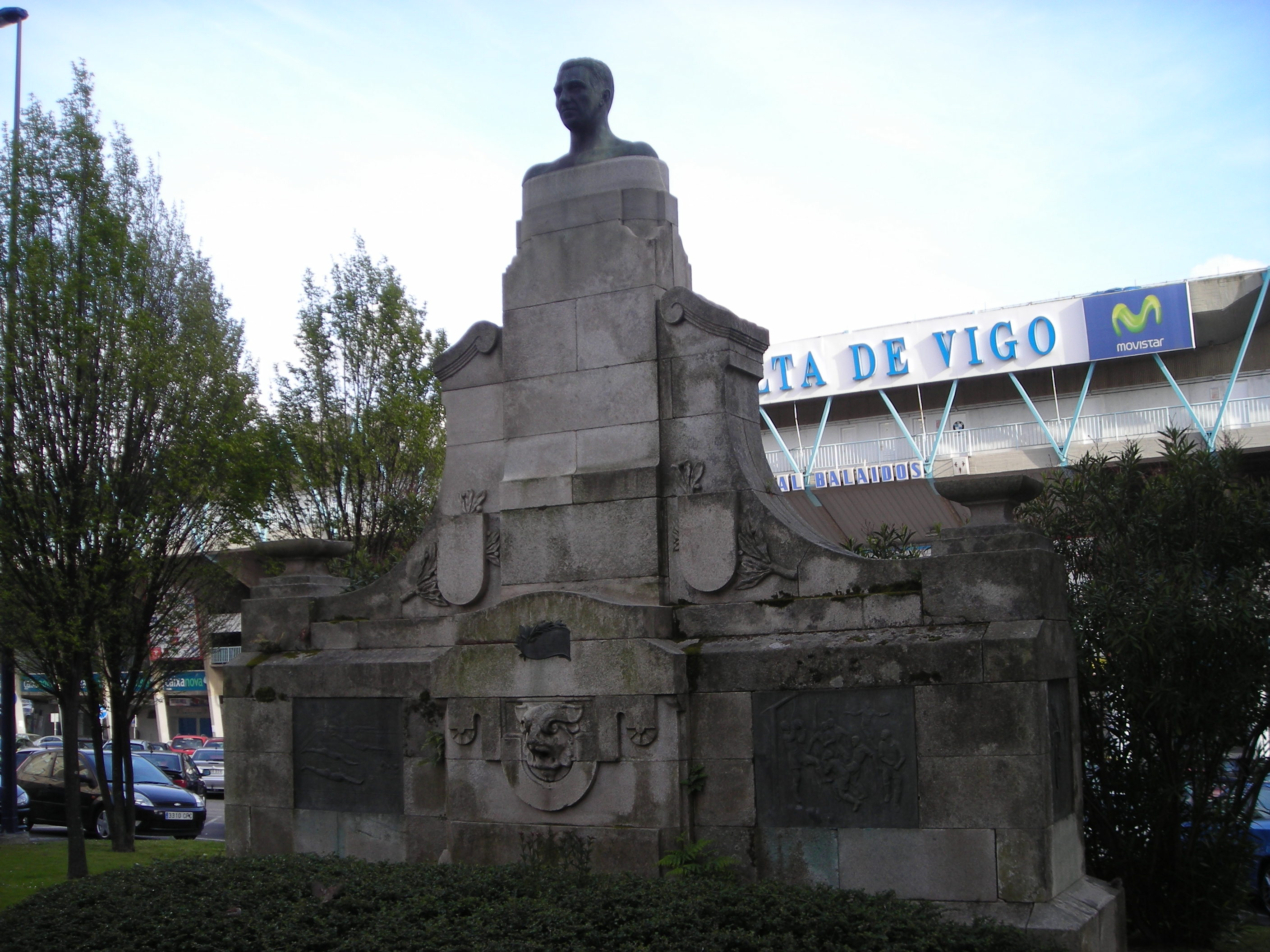
Sculpture of Manuel de Castro Hándicap in the vicinity of the Balaídos stadium.

He died on 27 August 1944,

== Legacy ==
A bust of him was installed on the street named for him on 20 May 1956.

In 2011, the "Manuel de Castro" award is given for the best Celta player of the calendar year,
