= William Bryant (footballer, born 1899) =

English footballer

Personal information
- Full name: William Ingram Bryant
- Date of birth: 1 March 1899
- Place of birth: Ghent, Belgium
- Date of death: 21 January 1986 (aged 86)
- Place of death: Witham, England
- Height: 6 ft 1 in (1.85 m)
- Position: Centre half

Senior career*
Years	Team	Apps	(Gls)
–1925	Clapton		
1925–1931	Millwall	132	(30)
1931–1933	Clapton		

International career
1925	England	1	(0)
- * Club domestic league appearances and goals

William Ingram Bryant (1 March 1899 – 21 January 1986) was an English international footballer who played club football for Clapton and Millwall. Born in Ghent, Belgium, Bryant played as a centre half.

Whilst a Clapton player Bryant was capped by England, in a match against France in May 1925. It was to be his only England appearance.

Bryant first played a Football League match for Millwall in the 1925–26 season and he went on to play over 130 League games for the Lions.

He died in Witham in 1986.

== See also ==
- List of England international footballers born outside England
