= Walter Bellamy =

English footballer

Personal information
- Full name: Walter Richard Bellamy
- Date of birth: 6 November 1904
- Place of birth: Tottenham, England
- Date of death: 19 October 1978 (aged 73)
- Place of death: Hadley Wood, England
- Height: 5 ft 8 in (1.73 m)
- Position: Outside left

Senior career*
Years	Team	Apps	(Gls)
- Ilford
- Tufnell Park
- Dulwich Hamlet
1926–1934	Tottenham Hotspur	70	(10)
1935–1936	Brighton & Hove Albion	3	(0)
- * Club domestic league appearances and goals

Walter Bellamy (6 November 1904 – 19 October 1978) was a professional footballer who played for Ilford, Tufnell Park, Dulwich Hamlet, Tottenham Hotspur and Brighton & Hove Albion.

== Football career ==
Bellamy played for non–league sides Ilford, Tufnell Park, and Dulwich Hamlet before joining Tottenham Hotspur. The outside left played a total of 73 matches and scoring 10 goals for the Lilywhites in all competitions between 1927 and 1934. He moved to Brighton & Hove Albion in 1935 where he went on to feature in a further three matches.
