= Alfred Bower =

English footballer

Alfred George Bower (10 November 1895 – 30 June 1970) was an English amateur footballer who played at full back. He made five appearances for England between 1923 and 1927, three times as captain. He was a member of the Corinthian amateur club and made nine appearances for Chelsea between 1923 and 1926.

== School and Army ==
Bower was born in Bromley, Kent and educated at Charterhouse School; he only began to excel at football after leaving school and joining Old Carthusians. During the First World War, he served in the Army, initially as a second lieutenant in the 4th (City of London) Battalion, The London Regiment (Royal Fusiliers) before transferring to the 1st Battalion on 27 July 1915. Later in the war he was a temporary captain.

At the end of World War I he joined the Corinthians and developed into an extremely dependable full back, able to play on either flank.

== Football career ==
=== Corinthians ===
He made his Corinthians debut an "A" team match in a 10–1 victory over a "Public Schools" XI on 3 January 1920.

During the 1920s and early 1930s he played in most of Corinthians' more important matches, including all 16 FA Cup matches played between 1923 and 1930. He was a member of the Corinthian team that defeated Blackburn Rovers 1–0 in the first round of the cup on 12 January 1924, before going out to West Bromwich Albion in the second round. In 1925–26, Corinthian met Manchester City on 9 January 1926; after a 3–3 draw in the first match, Corinthian lost the replay 4–0. They also defeated Walsall 4–0 on 8 January 1927 and Norwich City 5–0 in the third round on 12 January 1929.

Bower was an occasional member of the Corinthians' foreign tours. His last match for Corinthian came in Switzerland on 19 April 1930 in a 7–1 victory over Young Boys, Berne. Between 1920 and 1930, he made a total of 180 appearances for the Corinthians, never scoring.

He wound up his football career with Casuals. Between 1928 and 1933 he represented the public schools on the Football Association Council.

=== Chelsea ===
He made three First Division appearances for Chelsea in 1923–24 playing at right back, but was unable to prevent Chelsea being relegated to the Second Division. Two seasons later, he made a further six appearances, this time on the left as Chelsea finished in third place, five points adrift of the second promotion position.

He remains probably the only person to play top flight league football whilst at the same time being a Member of the London Stock Exchange.

=== England ===
He won 13 amateur England international caps and five full England caps at a time when it was becoming increasingly rare for an amateur to play for the full international team.

He was capped by the England amateur team thirteen times and was selected for five full England matches, the last three as captain. His first cap came in the Home International Championship match against Northern Ireland on 20 October 1923, when England were defeated 2–1. He retained his place for the next match in Belgium which was again a draw (2–2).

A year later, he was recalled to the England team and was appointed captain for a match against Belgium at The Hawthorns on 8 December 1924 which England won 4–0 with two goals each from Joe Bradford and Billy Walker. He retained his place, and the captaincy, for the next match, in the Home International Championship, against Wales on 28 February 1925, when England were victorious by 2 goals to one, with Frank Roberts scoring England's goals.

Two years later, he was the last amateur player to captain England, in a 3–3 draw with Wales on 12 February 1927, with two goals from Dixie Dean.

== Life away from football ==
He joined the London Stock Exchange at the end of the First World War, remaining a member until 1954. He then became a welfare officer in Croydon until he retired in 1960.
