= Edgar Kail =

English footballer

Personal information
- Full name: Edgar Isaac Lewis Kail
- Date of birth: 26 November 1900
- Place of birth: London, England
- Date of death: 17 January 1976 (aged 75)
- Place of death: Skelmorlie, Scotland
- Position: Inside right

Senior career*
Years	Team	Apps	(Gls)
1915–1933	Dulwich Hamlet		(427)

International career
1920-1933	England Amateurs	30	(12)
1929	England	3	(2)
- * Club domestic league appearances and goals

Edgar Isaac Lewis Kail (26 November 1900 – 17 January 1976) was an English footballer who played for Dulwich Hamlet and the England national team, as an inside forward. He was the last non-league player to play for the full England team.

== Early life ==
Edgar Kail was born in Camberwell, London on 26 November 1900 to James Walker Issac Kail, a post office sorter and Rosa Mary Kail (née Yells). At the time of his birth, the family lived at 11 Thompson Road and Edgar was the youngest of three sons. By 1911, the Kails had moved round the corner 80a Landcroft Road, Dulwich during which time Rosa had given birth to three more sons and a daughter.

== Club career ==
=== Dulwich Hamlet ===
After representing various South London schools, Kail signed for Dulwich Hamlet in 1915 aged 15 years. Kail was a committed amateur at Dulwich Hamlet, turning down moves to professional clubs to stay at the club. With Dulwich he won the FA Amateur Cup in 1920 and 1932. He played for the "Amateurs" in the 1929 FA Charity Shield.

=== Links with other clubs ===
Kail played a charity match for Queen's Park against Rangers in May 1932. He also signed amateur forms for Chelsea in March 1930 but did not make any league appearances.

== International career ==
Kail had a short international career, only six days long, gaining three caps on England's brief continental tour of 1929 against Spain, Belgium and France. He scored two goals on his debut against France.

During the match against Spain, he became the last non-league player to play for the full England team, although not the last amateur – Bernard Joy of Casuals and Arsenal played for England in 1936.

== Personal life ==
Kail married Irene Margaret Ramsey, daughter of Dulwich Hamlet groundsman, Dalhousie Ramsey in Camberwell in February 1926.

He died in Skelmorlie, Ayrshire in 1976 from a stroke.

== Legacy ==
In the 1990s the approach to Dulwich's ground, Champion Hill, was renamed Edgar Kail Way in his honour.

In 2003, a blue plaque dedicated to Kail was unveiled by Southwark Council at the site of Champion Hill.

Edgar Kail remains a cult figure amongst Dulwich Hamlet FC fans, with his name still sung at games each week.
