= 1981–82 Real Sociedad season =

Real Sociedad
1981–1982 season
- President: Jose Luis Orbegozo
- Manager: Alberto Ormaetxea
- La Liga: Winner
- Copa del Rey: Quarter-finals
- European Cup: First round
- Top goalscorer: Uralde

The 1981–82 season is Real Sociedad's last league trophy to date. The Basque were capable of defending the title they had won the year before, in a race that went to the last day of the season.

This article shows player statistics and all matches that the club played during the 1981–82 season.

== Season summary ==
In 1981 league champion Real Sociedad took part in the European cup for the first time in its history. The European adventure would however turn to be a disappointment. A single goal was enough for CSKA Sofia to beat the Guipuscoans and advance to the second round.

In the league Real Sociedad started strongly, topping the league until late November, when FC Barcelona took over. From that moment on the Basque remained close to the top although rarely first. Real Madrid, Barcelona and Real Sociedad were the top three teams during most of the season. An away defeat to Hércules in March widened the gap to 5 points from the top. This was interpreted as the end of Real Sociedad's bid for the title. An unlikely succession of events would reverse this situation. FCB only picked 2 points in the last 6 games thanks to which Real Sociedad had a chance of winning the league on the last matchday. The Madrid-Barcelona Derby was disputed on the 33rd matchday. Madrid's victory contributed to Barcelona's catastrophic run. Both Madrid and Barcelona failed to win their respective matches on the last matchday while Real Sociedad beat Athletic in the basque derby. Thus Real Sociedad won the league for the second time in its history.

The Copa del Rey final was within Real Sociedad's reach too. The semifinals against Real Madrid were resolved with a penalty shootout which the Madrilians won. Prior to this the Guipuscoans had knocked out Valladolid, Athletic Bilbao, Osasuna and Athletic Bilbao B.

== Start formations ==
Starting XI

Lineup that started most of the club's competitive matches throughout the season.

| No. | Pos. | Nat. | Name | MS | Notes |
|---|---|---|---|---|---|
| | GK | (Spain) | Arconada | 34 | |
| | RB | (Spain) | Zelayeta | 25 | |
| | CB | (Spain) | Gorriz | 34 | |
| | CB | (Spain) | Kortabarria | 34 | |
| | LB | (Spain) | Olaizola | 22 | |
| | MF | (Spain) | Alonso | 31 | |
| | MF | (Spain) | Alvarez | 29 | |
| | AM | (Spain) | Zamora | 31 | |
| | AM | (Spain) | Uralde | 27 | |
| | LW | (Spain) | López Ufarte | 32 | |
| | FW | (Spain) | Satrustegi | 33 | |

== Players ==
=== Squad information ===
Note: Flags indicate national team as defined under FIFA eligibility rules; some limited exceptions apply. Players may hold more than one non-FIFA nationality.

| No. | Pos. | Nation | Player |
|---|---|---|---|
| — | GK | ESP | Luis Arconada |
| — | DF | ESP | Genaro Zelaieta |
| — | DF | ESP | Inaxio Kortabarria |
| — | MF | ESP | Jose Maria Bakero |
| — | MF | ESP | Diego Alvarez |
| — | DF | ESP | Alberto Górriz |
| — | FW | ESP | Uralde |
| — | FW | ESP | Roberto López Ufarte |
| — | MF | ESP | Periko Alonso |
| — | MF | ESP | Jesús María Zamora |
| — | GK | ESP | Pedro Otxotorena |

| No. | Pos. | Nation | Player |
|---|---|---|---|
| — | MF | ESP | Larrañaga |
| — | FW | ESP | Satrústegui |
| — | DF | ESP | Eliseo Murillo |
| — | DF | ESP | Julio Olaizola |
| — | DF | ESP | Tomas Orbegozo |
| — | GK | BRA | Biurrun |
| — | DF | ESP | Gajate |
| — | MF | ESP | Javier Zubillaga |
| — | MF | ESP | Salva Iriarte |
| — | FW | ESP | Francisco Javier Eizmendi |

=== Player statistics ===
Squad stats
| Player | Games played | Full games | Games starting | Used as sub | Minutes | Injuries | Cards | Sending-offs | Goals | Missed penalties |
|---|---|---|---|---|---|---|---|---|---|---|
| Luis Arconada | 34 | 34 | 34 | 0 | 3060 | 0 | 1 | 0 | 0 | 0 |
| Jose Maria Bakero | 2 | 1 | 2 | 0 | 168 | 0 | 0 | 0 | 0 | 0 |
| Genaro Zelaieta | 28 | 22 | 25 | 3 | 2189 | 1 | 3 | 0 | 0 | 0 |
| Inaxio Kortabarria | 31 | 29 | 31 | 0 | 2779 | 0 | 3 | 1 | 6 | 1 |
| Diego Alvarez | 31 | 21 | 29 | 2 | 2546 | 1 | 1 | 0 | 1 | 0 |
| Eliseo Murillo | 31 | 16 | 21 | 10 | 1951 | 0 | 1 | 0 | 0 | 0 |
| Francisco Javier Eizmendi | 1 | 0 | 0 | 1 | 25 | 0 | 0 | 0 | 0 | 0 |
| Alberto Górriz | 34 | 34 | 34 | 0 | 3060 | 0 | 2 | 0 | 0 | 0 |
| Salva Iriarte | 8 | 0 | 0 | 8 | 158 | 0 | 0 | 0 | 0 | 0 |
| Larrañaga | 34 | 17 | 20 | 14 | 2118 | 0 | 2 | 0 | 2 | 0 |
| Roberto López Ufarte | 32 | 30 | 32 | 0 | 2863 | 1 | 3 | 0 | 11 | 0 |
| Julio Olaizola | 25 | 15 | 22 | 3 | 1913 | 0 | 1 | 0 | 1 | 0 |
| Tomas Orbegozo | 6 | 1 | 1 | 5 | 164 | 0 | 1 | 0 | 0 | 0 |
| Periko Alonso | 31 | 22 | 31 | 0 | 2641 | 1 | 4 | 0 | 7 | 0 |
| Satrústegui | 33 | 30 | 33 | 0 | 2943 | 0 | 3 | 0 | 13 | 0 |
| Uralde | 28 | 24 | 27 | 1 | 2381 | 1 | 1 | 0 | 14 | 0 |
| Jesús María Zamora | 31 | 23 | 31 | 0 | 2516 | 2 | 1 | 0 | 3 | 0 |
| Javier Zubillaga | 8 | 0 | 1 | 7 | 184 | 0 | 0 | 0 | 0 | 0 |

== Transfers ==
=== In ===
| Player | From | Fee |
|---|---|---|
| (Brazil) Biurrun | (Spain) Real Sociedad B | Promoted academy player. |
| (Spain) Tomas Orbegozo | (Spain) Real Sociedad B | Promoted academy player. |
| (Spain) Javier Zubillaga | (Spain) Real Sociedad B | Promoted academy player. |
| (Spain) Francisco Javier Eizmendi | (Spain) Real Sociedad B | Promoted academy player. |
| (Spain) Salva Iriarte | (Spain) Real Sociedad B | Promoted academy player. |

=== Out ===
| Player | New Team | Fee |
|---|---|---|
| (Spain) Juan María Amiano | None | Retired |
| (Spain) Santiago Idígoras | (Mexico) Puebla F.C. | ? |
| (Spain) Gaztelu | None | Retired |
| (Spain) Manuel Cervantes | Real Murcia | ? |
| (Spain) Luis Miguel Heras Burgos | ? | ? |

== Coaching staff ==
- Alberto Ormaetxea

== 1981–82 European Cup ==
=== First round ===
| 16 September 1981 | CSKA Sofia | 1–0 | Real Sociedad | Sofia |
| | Yonchev 89' | (Report) | (yellow card) Julio Olaizola; (yellow card) Jesús María Zamora | Stadium: Vasil Levski National Stadium; Attendance: ? Referee: Bruno Galler |

| 30 September 1981 | Real Sociedad | 0–0 | CSKA Sofia | Sofia |
| | Alberto Górriz (yellow card) | (Report) | (yellow card) Becinsky; (yellow card) kalvourov (yellow card) Elliev; (yellow card) Velimov; (yellow card) Markov | Stadium: Atotxa; Attendance: ? Referee: Luigi Agnolin |

=== La Liga ===
==== League table ====
| Pos | Team | Pld | W | D | L | GF | GA | GD | Pts | Qualification or relegation |
|---|---|---|---|---|---|---|---|---|---|---|
| 1 | Real Sociedad (C) | 34 | 20 | 7 | 7 | 58 | 33 | +25 | 47 | Qualification for the European Cup first round |
| 2 | Barcelona | 34 | 19 | 7 | 8 | 75 | 40 | +35 | 45 | Qualification for the Cup Winners' Cup first round (Note: Real Madrid qualified for the European Cup Winners' Cup by winning the Copa del Rey, while Barcelona for the tournament as title holders.) |
| 3 | Real Madrid | 34 | 18 | 8 | 8 | 57 | 34 | +23 | 44 | Qualification for the Cup Winners' Cup first round |
| 4 | Athletic Bilbao | 34 | 18 | 4 | 12 | 63 | 41 | +22 | 40 | Qualification for the UEFA Cup first round |
| 5 | Valencia | 34 | 17 | 5 | 12 | 54 | 46 | +8 | 39 | Qualification for the UEFA Cup first round |

Source: BDFútbol
Rules for classification: 1) Points; 2) Head-to-head results; 3) Goal difference; 4) Number of goals scored
(C) Champions

==== Matches ====
| 20 September 1981 1 | Real Sociedad | 3–1 | Real Madrid | San Sebastián |
| | Roberto López Ufarte 20'; Periko Alonso 64' (yellow card) 62'; Zamora 72' | (Report) | 2' Ito; (yellow card) 35' García Cortés; (yellow card) 50' Navajas | Stadium: Atotxa Stadium; Referee: Sánchez Arminio |

| 27 September 1981 2 | Real Betis | 0–1 | Real Sociedad | Seville |
| | Ortega (yellow card) | (Report) | 81' Periko Alonso; (yellow card) Zamora | Stadium: Benito Villamarín Stadium; Referee: Pes Pérez |

| 4 October 1981 3 | Real Sociedad | 3–0 | Cádiz CF | San Sebastián |
| | Uralde 30'; Inaxio Kortabarria 41' (pen.); Roberto López Ufarte 44' | (Report) | | Stadium: Atotxa Stadium; Referee: Riera Marro |

| 7 October 1981 4 | Las Palmas | 0–0 | Real Sociedad | Las Palmas de Gran Canaria |
| | | (Report) | | Stadium: Estadio Insular; Referee: García Carrión |

| 11 October 1981 5 | Real Sociedad | 3–0 | Sporting Gijón | San Sebastián |
| | Uralde 11'; Satrústegui 31'; Periko Alonso 68'; Olaizola (yellow card) 10' | (Report) | (yellow card) 60' Jiménez | Stadium: Atotxa Stadium; Referee: Enríquez Negreira |

| 18 October 1981 6 | CD Castellón | 1–3 | Real Sociedad | Castelló de la Plana |
| | Oscar Ferrero 29' | (Report) | 40', 52' Roberto López Ufarte; 62' Satrústegui | Stadium: Estadio Castalia; Referee: Merino González |

| 24 October 1981 7 | Real Sociedad | 1–1 | FC Barcelona | San Sebastián |
| | Diego Alvarez 3' | (Report) | 27' Quini; (yellow card) Schuster; (yellow card) Víctor | Stadium: Atotxa Stadium; Referee: Soriano Aladrén |

| 1 November 1981 8 | Racing de Santander | 2–3 | Real Sociedad | Santander |
| | Juan Verón 4', 24' | (Report) | 13' (pen.) Inaxio Kortabarria; 49' Satrústegui; 62' Periko Alonso | Stadium: El Sardinero; Referee: Damin Rendón |

| 8 November 1981 9 | Real Valladolid | 2–1 | Real Sociedad | Valladolid |
| | Gail 12'; Minguela 81'; Fenoy (yellow card); Pepín (yellow card) | (Report) | 59' Periko Alonso; (yellow card) Inaxio Kortabarria | Stadium: José Zorrilla; Referee: Diéz Frias |

| 11 November 1981 10 | Real Sociedad | 1–0 | Atlético Madrid | San Sebastián |
| | Satrústegui 4' | (Report) | | Stadium: Atotxa Stadium; Referee: Riera Morro |

| 15 November 1981 11 | Sevilla FC | 2–2 | Real Sociedad | Seville |
| | Juan Carlos 44'; Ruda 77'; César Coelho (yellow card); Yiyi (yellow card) | (Report) | 20' Satrústegui; 30' (pen.) Inaxio Kortabarria; (yellow card) Zamora; (yellow card) Genaro Zelaieta | Stadium: Ramón Sánchez Pizjuán Stadium; Referee: Miguel Pérez |

| 22 November 1981 12 | Real Sociedad | 2–1 | Hércules | San Sebastián |
| | Larrañaga 2'; Inaxio Kortabarria 36' (pen.) | (Report) | Cobos 91' | Stadium: Atotxa Stadium; Referee: Ausocoa Sanz |

| 28 November 1981 13 | Real Zaragoza | 3–2 | Real Sociedad | Zaragoza |
| | Valdano 3', 36'; Amarilla 13' | (Report) | 18' Roberto López Ufarte; 30' Uralde; (yellow card) 64' Periko Alonso | Stadium: La Romareda; Referee: Sánchez Arminio |

| 6 December 1981 14 | Real Sociedad | 4–1 | Valencia CF | San Sebastián |
| | Zamora 30'; Roberto López Ufarte 49'; Larrañaga 64'; Satrústegui 73'; Genaro Zelaieta (yellow card) | (Report) | 51' Solsona; (yellow card) 15' Castellanos | Stadium: Atotxa Stadium; Referee: Lamo Castillo |

| 13 December 1981 15 | Espanyol | 2–1 | Real Sociedad | Barcelona |
| | Murua 17'; Canito 86' (yellow card); Giménez (yellow card) 32'; Job (yellow card) | (Report) | 24' (pen.) Inaxio Kortabarria | Stadium: Estadi Olímpic Lluís Companys; Referee: Pes Pérez |

| 20 December 1981 16 | Real Sociedad | 1–0 | Osasuna | San Sebastián |
| | Roberto López Ufarte 72'; Murillo (yellow card) 20' | (Report) | (yellow card) 20' Dioni; (yellow card) 74' Patxi Irigibel | Stadium: Atotxa Stadium; Referee: Pinter Pastor |

| 27 December 1981 17 | Athletic Bilbao | 1–1 | Real Sociedad | Bilbao |
| | Urquiaga 65'; Nuñez (yellow card) 51' | (Report) | 51' (pen.) Inaxio Kortabarria; (yellow card) Orbegozo | Stadium: San Mamés Stadium; Referee: Franco Martínez |

| 2 January 1982 18 | Real Madrid | 1–1 | Real Sociedad | Madrid |
| | Ito 70'; Juanito (yellow card); Ángel (yellow card) | (Report) | 86' (yellow card) Uralde; (yellow card) Gorriz; (yellow card) Satrústegui | Stadium: Santiago Bernabéu Stadium; Referee: Enriquez Negreira |

| 10 January 1982 19 | Real Sociedad | 1–0 | Real Betis | San Sebastián |
| | Satrústegui 71'; Larrañaga (yellow card) 65' | (Report) | (yellow card) 29' Ortega | Stadium: Atotxa Stadium; Referee: Riera Morro |

| 17 January 1982 20 | Cádiz CF | 2–1 | Real Sociedad | Cádiz |
| | Mejías 32'; Mané 70'; Hugo Vaca (yellow card) | (Report) | Uralde | Stadium: Estadio Ramón de Carranza; Referee: García Carrión |

| 24 January 1982 21 | Real Sociedad | 2–0 | Las Palmas | San Sebastián |
| | Satrústegui 18'; Periko Alonso 63' | (Report) | | Stadium: Atotxa Stadium; Referee: Alvarez Margüenda |

| 31 January 1982 22 | Sporting Gijón | 2–3 | Real Sociedad | Gijón |
| | Uría 28'; Abel 47' | (Report) | 37' Satrústegui; 49' Uralde; 59' Roberto López Ufarte | Stadium: El Molinón; Referee: García de Loza |

| 7 February 1982 23 | Real Sociedad | 3–1 | CD Castellón | San Sebastián |
| | Uralde 4'; Periko Alonso 38'; Satrústegui 53' | (Report) | 17' (pen.) Beltrán; (yellow card) 56' Pulido | Stadium: Atotxa Stadium; Referee: García de Loza |

| 14 February 1982 24 | FC Barcelona | 2–0 | Real Sociedad | Barcelona |
| | Simonsen 33'; Alexanko 51' | (Report) | | Stadium: Camp Nou; Referee: Soriano Aladrén |

| 21 February 1982 25 | Real Sociedad | 1–1 | Racing de Santander | San Sebastián |
| | Satrústegui 26' (yellow card) 26' | (Report) | 26' (yellow card) 26' Piru; (yellow card) 26' Pereira; (yellow card) 33' Mantilla | Stadium: Atotxa Stadium; Referee: Fandos Hernández |

| 28 February 1982 26 | Real Sociedad | 4–0 | Real Valladolid | San Sebastián |
| | Satrústegui 30'; Uralde 41', 73'; Olaizola 72' | (Report) | (yellow card) 60' Sánchez Vallés | Stadium: Atotxa Stadium; Referee: Damín Rondón |

| 7 March 1982 27 | Atlético Madrid | 2–0 | Real Sociedad | Madrid |
| | Arteche 70'; Dirceu 72' | (Report) | | Stadium: Vicente Calderón Stadium; Referee: García de Loza |

| 14 March 1982 28 | Real Sociedad | 1–0 | Sevilla FC | San Sebastián |
| | Uralde 21' | (Report) | | Stadium: Atotxa Stadium; Referee: Miguel Pérez |

| 21 March 1982 29 | Hércules | 2–0 | Real Sociedad | Alicante |
| | Abad 18'; Cabral 26' (yellow card); Churruca (yellow card); Vidal (yellow card) | (Report) | (yellow card) Gorriz; (yellow card) Luis Arconada; (yellow card) Roberto López Ufarte | Stadium: Estadio José Rico Pérez; Referee: Andújar Oliver |

| 27 March 1982 30 | Real Sociedad | 3–0 | Real Zaragoza | San Sebastián |
| | Uralde 35'; Periko Alonso 42' (yellow card) 26'; Roberto López Ufarte 46' | (Report) | (yellow card) 77' Pérez Aguerri | Stadium: Atotxa Stadium; Referee: Pinter Pastor |

| 4 April 1982 31 | Valencia CF | 1–2 | Real Sociedad | Valencia |
| | Solsona 20' | (Report) | 5', 45' Uralde | Stadium: Mestalla Stadium; Referee: Soriano Aladrén |

| 11 April 1982 32 | Real Sociedad | 2–1 | Espanyol | San Sebastián |
| | Uralde 22'; Satrústegui 73'; Inaxio Kortabarria (yellow card) 12' (red card) 88'; Genaro Zelaieta (yellow card) 42'; Periko Alonso (yellow card) 85' | (Report) | 27' Urbano; (yellow card) 18' Lauridssen; (yellow card) 52' Escalza; (yellow card) 53' Zúñiga | Stadium: Atotxa Stadium; Referee: Merino González |

| 18 April 1982 33 | Osasuna | 0–0 | Real Sociedad | Pamplona |
| | Bayona (yellow card) | (Report) | (yellow card) Roberto López Ufarte | Stadium: Sadar Stadium; Referee: Damín Rendón |

| 25 April 1982 34 | Real Sociedad | 2–1 | Athletic Bilbao | San Sebastián |
| | Zamora 55'; Roberto López Ufarte 78' | (Report) | 85' (yellow card) 55' Sarabia; (yellow card) 52' Urquiaga | Stadium: Atotxa Stadium; Referee: Soriano Aladrén |

== King's cup ==
=== 2nd Round ===
| 21 Oct 1981 | Athletic Bilbao B | 1–3 | Real Sociedad | Bilbao |
| | Arrien 27' (pen.) | Report (in Spanish) | 15' López Ufarte; 27' Larrañaga (pen.) Satrústegui | Stadium: San Mamés; Referee: José Díez Frías |

| 4 Nov 1981 | Real Sociedad | 1–0 | Athletic Bilbao B | San Sebastián |
| | Eizmendi 73' | Report (in Spanish) | | Stadium: Atotxa; Referee: José Ramón Gutiérrez |

=== 3rd Round ===
| 25 Nov 1981 | Osasuna | 1–1 | Real Sociedad | Pamplona |
| | Martín 44' | Report (in Spanish) | Alonso 85' | Stadium: El Sadar; Referee: Jose Luis Garcia Carrion |

| 9 Dec 1981 | Real Sociedad | 3–1 | Osasuna | San Sebastián |
| | Uralde 41', 82'; Satrústegui 58' | Report (in Spanish) | Martín | Stadium: Atotxa; Referee: Manuel Álvarez Margüenda |

=== Round of 16 ===
| 20 January 1982 | Real Sociedad | 3–3 | Real Valladolid Deportivo | San Sebastián |
| 20:00 CET | Satrústegui 44'; Periko Alonso 78'; Diego 84' | Report (in Spanish) | Joaquín 18'; Alí 41'; Jorge 88' | Stadium: Atotxa; Referee: Gutiérrez Fernández (Asturias) |

| 27 January 1982 | Real Valladolid Deportivo | 0–2 | Real Sociedad | Valladolid |
| 20:30 CET | | Report (in Spanish) | Diego 63'; Periko Alonso 64' | Stadium: José Zorrilla; Referee: Urízar Azpitarte (Basque Country (autonomous community)) |

=== Quarterfinals ===
| 3 February 1982 | Athletic Bilbao | 1–0 | Real Sociedad | Bilbao |
| 20:00 CET | Dani 31' | Report (in Spanish) | | Stadium: San Mamés; Attendance: 40,000; Referee: Andújar Oliver (Andalusia) |

| 17 February 1982 | Real Sociedad | 3–2 (a.e.t.) (4–2 p) | Athletic Bilbao | San Sebastián |
| 20:00 CET | Kortabarria 5' (pen.); Uralde 60'; Satrústegui 70' | Report (in Spanish) | Sarabia 57'; Dani 63' (pen.) | Stadium: Atotxa; Referee: Lamo Castillo (Castile and León) |
| | Penalties |
| | Kortabarria (penalty scored); López Ufarte (penalty scored); Uralde (penalty scored); Larrañaga (penalty scored) | | (penalty missed) Dani; (penalty scored) Argote; (penalty scored) Sola; (penalty missed) Goikoetxea |

=== Semifinals ===
| 10 March 1982 | Real Sociedad | 1–0 | Real Madrid CF | San Sebastián |
| 20:00 CET | Satrústegui 63' | Report (in Spanish) | | Stadium: Atotxa; Referee: Enríquez Negreira (Catalonia) |

| 31 March 1982 | Real Madrid CF | 1–0 (a.e.t.) (4–3 p) | Real Sociedad | Madrid |
| 21:00 CET | Juanito 89' | Report (in Spanish) | | Stadium: Santiago Bernabéu; Referee: Enríquez Negreira (Catalonia) |
| | Penalties |
| | Camacho (penalty missed); Cunningham (penalty scored); García Hernández (penalty missed); Juanito (penalty scored); San José (penalty scored); Ito (penalty scored) | | (penalty missed) Kortabarria; (penalty scored) López Ufarte; (penalty missed) Diego; (penalty scored) Larrañaga; (penalty scored) Periko Alonso; (penalty missed) Murillo |
