= 1980–81 Real Sociedad season =

Real Sociedad
1980–81 season
- President: José Luis Orbegozo
- Head coach: Alberto Ormaetxea
- Stadium: Atotxa
- La Liga: Winners (in 1981–82 European Cup)
- Copa del Rey: Round of 16
- UEFA Cup: Third round
- Top goalscorer: League: Satrústegui (16); All: Satrústegui (19)
Home colours

During the season the club competed in Primera Division, UEFA Cup and Copa del Rey.

== Summary ==
After a shockingly lost trophy the season before, the club won its first league title ever in a closed race against Atlético Madrid and, in the last rounds of the season against Real Madrid) being awarded the prize on the last round in Gijón thanks to a 89-minute goal by Zamora.),)))).

== Squad ==
Note: Flags indicate national team as defined under FIFA eligibility rules; some limited exceptions apply. Players may hold more than one non-FIFA nationality.

No.	Pos.	Nation	Player
—	GK	ESP	Luis Arconada
—	GK	ESP	Manuel Cervantes
—	GK	ESP	Pedro María Otxorena
—	DF	ESP	Marcelino Arano
—	DF	ESP	Genaro Celayeta
—	DF	ESP	Agustín Gajate
—	DF	ESP	Alberto Górriz
—	DF	ESP	Ignacio Kortabarría
—	DF	ESP	Juan Antonio Larrañaga
—	DF	ESP	Eliseo Murillo
—	DF	ESP	Julio Olaizola
—	MF	ESP	Perico Alonso

No.	Pos.	Nation	Player
—	MF	ESP	José Diego Álvarez
—	MF	ESP	José Agustín Aranzábal
—	MF	ESP	José Mari Bakero
—	MF	ESP	Salvador Iriarte
—	MF	ESP	Jesús María Zamora
—	FW	ESP	Juan María Amiano
—	FW	ESP	Santiago Idígoras
—	FW	ESP	Luis Miguel Heras
—	FW	ESP	Roberto López Ufarte
—	FW	ESP	Jesús María Satrústegui
—	FW	ESP	Pedro Uralde

=== Transfers ===
In
Pos.	Name	From	Type
MF	José Mari Bakero	San Sebastián CF	
DF	Marcelino Arano	San Sebastián CF	
DF	Juan Antonio Larrañaga	San Sebastián CF	

Out
Pos.	Name	To	Type
DF	Luciano Murillo	UD Salamanca	

== Results ==
=== Primera División ===
==== League table ====
Pos	Team	Pld	W	D	L	GF	GA	GD	Pts	Qualification or relegation
1	Real Sociedad (C)	34	19	7	8	52	29	+23	45 (Note: Real Sociedad finished ahead of Real Madrid on head-to-head goal-difference: Real Madrid 1-0 Real Sociedad, Real Sociedad 3-1 Real Madrid.)	Qualification for the European Cup first round
2	Real Madrid	34	20	5	9	66	37	+29	45	Qualification for the UEFA Cup first round
3	Atlético Madrid	34	17	8	9	59	41	+18	42 (Note: Atlético Madrid finished ahead of Valencia on head-to-head points: Atlético Madrid 3-1 Valencia, Valencia 0-0 Atlético Madrid.)	Qualification for the UEFA Cup first round
4	Valencia	34	16	10	8	46	39	+7	42	Qualification for the UEFA Cup first round
5	Barcelona	34	18	5	11	66	41	+25	41	Qualification for the Cup Winners' Cup first round (Note: Barcelona qualified to the Cup Winners' Cup as winners of the Copa del Rey.)

Source: BDFútbol
Rules for classification: 1) Points; 2) Head-to-head results; 3) Goal difference; 4) Number of goals scored
(C) Champions

==== Position by round ====
Round	1	2	3	4	5	6	7	8	9	10	11	12	13	14	15	16	17	18	19	20	21	22	23	24	25	26	27	28	29	30	31	32	33	34
Ground	A	H	A	H	A	H	H	A	H	A	H	A	H	A	H	A	H	H	A	H	A	A	H	A	H	A	H	A	H	A	H	A	H	A
Result	L	W	W	D	D	L	W	W	W	L	W	L	W	D	W	D	L	W	W	W	L	L	D	L	W	W	W	D	W	W	W	W	W	D
Position	10	8	5	7	7	9	7	4	3	5	3	5	4	5	4	3	4	4	3	2	3	4	4	7	7	6	5	3	3	2	1	1	1	1

Source: BD Futbol Squad of Real Sociedad 1980-81
A = Away; H = Home; W = Win; D = Draw; L = Loss; = 1981–82 European Cup; = 1981–82 UEFA Cup

==== Matches ====
6 September 1980 1	Valencia CF	3–2	Real Sociedad	Valencia
	Solsona 33'; Morena 64'; Solsona 74'	Report	78'Satrústegui; 80'Uralde	Stadium: Mestalla; Referee: Soriano Aladrén

13 September 1980 2	Real Sociedad	2–1	Osasuna	San Sebastián
	Satrústegui 75'; Gajate 87'	Report	77' Dioni	Stadium: Atotxa; Referee: Ramo Castillo

21 September 1980 3	UD Las Palmas	0–3	Real Sociedad	Las Palmas
		Report	54' Uralde; 74' Diego; 82' (pen.) Kortabarria; 66' Julio Suarez	Stadium: Insular; Referee: Sanchez-Molina

27 September 1980 4	Real Sociedad	2–2	Atlético Madrid	San Sebastián
	Satrústegui 36'; Kortabarría 73' (pen.)	Report	26'Dirceu; 35'Marcos Alonso	Stadium: Atotxa; Referee: Tomeo Palanques

5 October 1980 5	Real Sociedad	2–2	Real Betis	San Sebastián
	Zamora 62'; Ortega 86' (o.g.)	Report	19'Diarte; 83'Morán	Stadium: Atotxa; Referee: García Carrión

10 October 1980 6	Hercules CF	2–0	Real Sociedad	Alicante
	Churruca 23'; Kortabarria (penalty missed) 33'; Kustudić 70'	Report		Stadium: José Rico Pérez; Referee: Enríquez Negreira

19 October 1980 7	Real Sociedad	2–0	FC Barcelona	San Sebastián
	Jose Antonio (red card) 38'; Idígoras 64'; Uralde 87'	Report	(yellow card) 60' (yellow-red card) Olaizola	Stadium: Atotxa; Referee: Pes Pérez

26 October 1980 8	UD Salamanca	0–2	Real Sociedad	Villares de la Reina
		Report	20' Idigoras; 44' Satrústegui; 64' Perico Alonso	Stadium: Helmántico; Referee: Franco Martínez

1 November 1980 9	Real Sociedad	1–0	Real Zaragoza	San Sebastián
	Kortabarría 40' (pen.); Uralde (penalty missed) 45'	Report	(yellow card) 80' (yellow-red card) Camus	Stadium: Atotxa; Referee: Miguel Pérez

9 November 1980 10	Real Madrid	1–0	Real Sociedad	Madrid
	Stielike 11' 'Santillana 58'; Del Bosque (yellow card) 72' (yellow-red card)	Report		Stadium: Santiago Bernabéu; Referee: Enríquez Negreira

16 November 1980 11	Real Sociedad	1–0	Real Valladolid	San Sebastián
	Zamora 7'; Satrustegui 85'	Report		Stadium: Atotxa; Referee: Martín Navarrete

23 November 1980 12	UD Almeria	3–2	Real Sociedad	Almeria
	Camacho 12'; Rolón 25'; Murúa 50' (pen.)	Report	43' Perico Alonso; 58' Satrústegui; 60' Zamora	Stadium: Antonio Franco Navarro; Referee: Soriano Aladrén

30 November 1980 13	Real Sociedad	4–1	Athletic Bilbao	San Sebastián
	Satrústegui 1'; Satrústegui 15'; López Ufarte 59'; López Ufarte 79'	Report	87'Endika	Stadium: Atotxa; Referee: Álvarez Margüenda

7 December 1980 14	Sevilla CF	0–0	Real Sociedad	Seville
	Choya 37'	Report		Stadium: Ramón Sánchez Pizjuán; Referee: Díez Frías

14 December 1980 14	Real Sociedad	1–0	Real Murcia	San Sebastián
	Idigoras 31'; Diego 32'	Report		Stadium: Atotxa; Referee: Ausocúa Sanz

21 December 1980 16	Espanol	0–0	Real Sociedad	Barcelona
	Lanchas 29'; Huertas 57'; Carreño (red card) 74'	Report		Stadium: Sarriá; Referee: García De Loza

28 December 1980 17	Real Sociedad	1–2	Sporting Gijón	San Sebastián
	Gajate 55'; Zamora 82'	Report	8'Abel; 57'Abel	Stadium: Atotxa; Referee: Fandos Hernández

4 January 1981 18	Real Sociedad	2–1	Valencia CF	San Sebastián
	Zamora 18'; Satrústegui 54'	Report	87' Felman	Stadium: Atotxa; Referee: Soriano Aladrén

11 January 1981 19	Osasuna	0–3	Real Sociedad	Pamplona
		Report	43' Uralde; 70' Uralde; 88'Uralde	Stadium: El Sadar; Referee: Sánchez Arminio

17 January 1981 20	Real Sociedad	2–0	UD Las Palmas	San Sebastián
	Satrústegui 61'; Idígoras 64'	Report		Stadium: Atotxa; Referee: Sanchez-Molina

25 January 1981 21	Atlético Madrid	2–0	Real Sociedad	Madrid
	Arteche 23'; Ruiz 41'; Marcos Alonso 81'; Julio Alberto 87'	Report		Stadium: Vicente Calderón; Referee: Merino González

1 February 1981 22	Real Betis	1–0	Real Sociedad	Seville
	Segundo 84'	Report		Stadium: Benito Villamarín; Referee: García Carrión

8 February 1981 23	Real Sociedad	1–1	Hercules CF	San Sebastián
	Kortabarría 10' (pen.)	Report	80' Moyano	Stadium: Atotxa; Referee: Mayoral Cedenilla

15 February 1981 24	FC Barcelona	2–0	Real Sociedad	Barcelona
	Schuster 12'; Quini 45' (pen.); Migueli 81'	Report		Stadium: Camp Nou; Referee: Ramos Marcos

22 February 1981 25	Real Sociedad	1–0	UD Salamanca	San Sebastián
	Satrústegui 86'	Report		Stadium: Atotxa; Referee: Condón Uriz

1 March 1981 26	Real Zaragoza	0–1	Real Sociedad	Zaragoza
		Report	25' Uralde	Stadium: La Romareda; Referee: Andújar Oliver

8 March 1981 27	Real Sociedad	3–1	Real Madrid	San Sebastián
	Diego 9'; Perico Alonso 58'; Zamora 69'	Report	25' García Hernández; (yellow card) 37' (yellow-red card) Sabido	Stadium: Atotxa; Referee: Enriquez Negreira

15 March 1981 28	Real Valladolid	0–0	Real Sociedad	Valladolid
		Report		Stadium: Municipal Jose Zorrilla; Referee: García De Loza

22 March 1981 29	Real Sociedad	3–1	UD Almeria	San Sebastián
	Satrústegui 3'; Zamora 26'; Satrústegui 37'	Report	86' (o.g.) Kortabarría	Stadium: Atotxa; Referee: Ausocúa Sanz

29 March 1981 30	Athletic Bilbao	0–2	Real Sociedad	Bilbao
		Report	57'Satrústegui; 89'Satrústegui	Stadium: San Mames; Referee: Sanchez-Molina

5 April 1981 31	Real Sociedad	3–0	Sevilla CF	San Sebastián
	López Ufarte 16'; Kortabarria (penalty missed) 32'; Satrústegui 32'; López Ufarte 79'	Report		Stadium: Atotxa; Referee: Franco Martínez

12 April 1981 32	Real Murcia	0–2	Real Sociedad	Murcia
		Report	35' (o.g.)Lago; 89' López Ufarte	Stadium: La Condomina; Referee: Soriano Aladrén

19 April 1981 33	Real Sociedad	2–1	Espanol	San Sebastián
	Satrústegui 48'; Idígoras 62'	Report	9' Marañón; (yellow card) 38' (yellow-red card) Arabi	Stadium: Atotxa; Referee: Merino González

26 April 1981 34	Sporting Gijón	2–2	Real Sociedad	Gijón
	Cundi 21'; Mesa 44'; Mesa 46'	Report	7' (pen.)Kortabarría; 89'Zamora	Stadium: El Molinón; Referee: Enriquez Negreira

=== Copa del Rey ===
==== Third round ====
7 January 1981 1	Real Sociedad	1–1	Cádiz CF	San Sebastián
				Stadium: Atotxa

21 January 1981 2	Cádiz CF	0–1	Real Sociedad	Cádiz
				Stadium: Ramón de Carranza

==== Eightfinals ====
29 April 1981 1	Sevilla CF	2–1	Real Sociedad	Seville
				Stadium: Ramón Sánchez Pizjuán

6 May 1981 2	Real Sociedad	1–1	Sevilla CF	San Sebastián
				Stadium: Atotxa

== Statistics ==
=== Squad statistics ===
Competition	Points	Total						GD
Competition	Points	G	W	D	L	Gs	Ga	GD
1980-81 Primera Division	45	34	19	7	8	52	29	+23
1980-81 Copa del Rey	-	4	1	2	1	4	4	0
1980-81 UEFA Cup	-	6	2	3	1	7	5	+2
Total	-	44	22	12	10	63	38	+25

==== Player statistics ====
No.	Pos	Nat	Player	Total		Primera Division		UEFA Cup		Copa del Rey	
No.	Pos	Nat	Player	Apps	Goals	Apps	Goals	Apps	Goals	Apps	Goals
	GK	(Spain) ESP	Luis Arconada	44	-39	34	-29	6	-6	4	-4
	DF	(Spain) ESP	Genaro Celayeta	40	0	32+1	0	5	0	2	0
	DF	(Spain) ESP	Alberto Górriz	42	0	30+2	0	5+1	0	4	0
	DF	(Spain) ESP	Ignacio Kortabarria	38	5	30	5	4	0	4	0
	DF	(Spain) ESP	Julio Olaizola	43	0	33	0	6	0	4	0
	MF	(Spain) ESP	Periko Alonso	43	5	32+1	3	6	1	4	1
	MF	(Spain) ESP	José Diego	42	3	33	3	6	0	3	0
	MF	(Spain) ESP	Jesús María Zamora	43	9	34	7	5	1	4	1
	FW	(Spain) ESP	Roberto López Ufarte	41	7	26+5	5	3+3	1	4	1
	FW	(Spain) ESP	Jesús María Satrústegui	38	19	28	16	6	3	4	0
	FW	(Spain) ESP	Santiago Idígoras	38	4	21+8	3	4+2	0	2+1	1
	GK	(Spain) ESP	Pedro María Otxotorena	0	0	0	0	0	0	0	0
	FW	(Spain) ESP	Pedro Uralde	38	8	17+12	7	4+1	1	2+2	0
	MF	(Spain) ESP	José Mari Bakero	31	0	10+17	0	2	0	0+2	0
	DF	(Spain) ESP	Eliseo Murillo	14	0	6+3	0	3+1	0	1	0
	DF	(Spain) ESP	Agustín Gajate	6	1	4	1	1	0	0+1	0
	DF	(Spain) ESP	Juan Antonio Larrañaga	11	0	3+6	0	0	0	2	0
	MF	(Spain) ESP	Gaztelu	2	0	1	0	0+1	0		
	FW	(Spain) ESP	Juan María Amiano	1	0	0+1	0				
	GK	(Spain) ESP	Manuel Cervantes	0	0	0	0	0	0	0	0
	DF	(Spain) ESP	Marcelino Arano								
	MF	(Spain) ESP	Salvador Iriarte								
	FW	(Spain) ESP	Luis Miguel Heras								

- Source: http://www.bdfutbol.com/en/t/t1980-8130.html
