= List of Real Sociedad players =

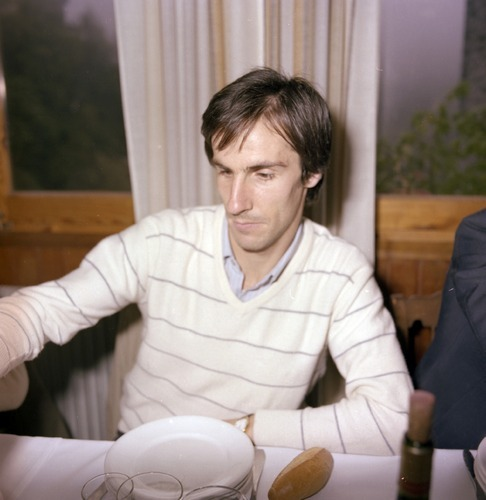
Alberto Górriz holds the record for appearances for Real Sociedad with 599 in all competitions. He won two La Liga titles, a Supercopa de España and a Copa del Rey in the 1980s.

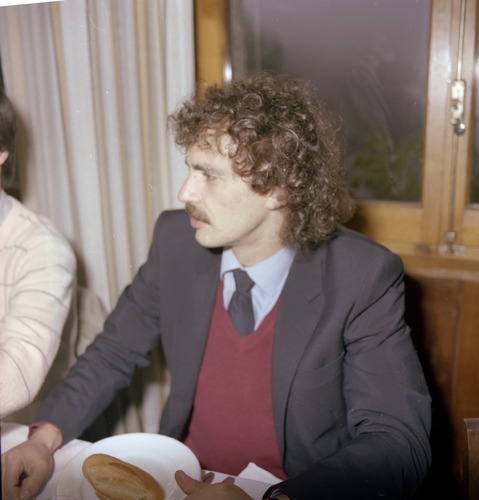
Jesús María Satrústegui is Real Sociedad's record goalscorer with a total of 163.

Real Sociedad de Fútbol is a football club based in Donostia-San Sebastián, Gipuzkoa, Basque Country, Spain.

San Sebastian Football Club was formed on a casual basis in 1905; they first won the Copa del Rey, Spain's primary knockout competition, in 1909 – due to a registration issue their players entered under the name of a local cycling group, Club Ciclista de San Sebastián. Following their victory, they were more formally founded as Sociedad de Fútbol, receiving royal patronage a year later. (Note: The BDFutbol website records the 1909 and 1910 cup runs as being made by separate teams (Club Ciclista and Vasconia respectively) with the Real Sociedad history beginning in 1912, but in any case none of the players involved – for example, Domingo Arrillaga played in all the relevant seasons – appeared in sufficient matches overall to appear in this list.) They eventually won the cup in a more definite manner in 1987, for a third time in 2020 (with a victory over Athletic Bilbao, their local rivals, in the final which was postponed by a year) and a fourth victory in 2026.

The club were founder members of La Liga in 1929 and have been participants in the country's highest division for the majority of the time since (2026–27 being their 80th entry), with short periods (16 seasons in total) in the lower Segunda División. La Real won the championship in consecutive seasons, 1980–81 and 1981–82, with a squad that was entirely home-grown. They first qualified for the UEFA Cup in 1974; as of July 2026, their continental record includes 20 seasons and 120 matches played.

Over 100 players have reached the milestone of 100 league appearances for Real Sociedad; in most cases these were all made in the top division – the list below has single columns for league appearances and goals, with lower-division contributions indicated.

== List of players ==
This list includes all players who have appeared in 100 matches for the club. For all registered players with a Wikipedia article, see Category:Real Sociedad footballers.

As of July 2026. Current players in bold.

| Name | From | To | League | | Copa del Rey | | Europe (Note: Includes the European Cup / Champions League, UEFA Cup / Europa League and Cup Winners' Cup.) | | Other (Note: Includes the Supercopa de España, the Copa de la Liga and promotion/relegation play-off matches. Statistics from the regional Gipuzkoa Championship are not included.) | | Total | |
| Name | From | To | Apps | Goals | Apps | Goals | Apps | Goals | Apps | Goals | Apps | Goals |
|---|---|---|---|---|---|---|---|---|---|---|---|---|
| Alberto Górriz | 1978 | 1993 | 461 | 14 | 90 | 4 | 33 | 0 | 15 | 0 | 599 | 18 |
| Jon Andoni Larrañaga | 1979 | 1994 | 460 | 15 | 87 | 2 | 25 | 2 | 17 | 0 | 589 | 19 |
| Jesús María Zamora | 1974 | 1989 | 455 | 63 | 89 | 14 | 31 | 2 | 13 | 1 | 588 | 80 |
| Luis Arconada | 1973 | 1989 | 414 | 0 | 92 | 0 | 31 | 0 | 14 | 0 | 551 | 0 |
| Xabi Prieto | 2003 | 2018 | 479 (Note: includes 103 Segunda División appearances.) | 67 (Note: includes 15 Segunda División goals.) | 34 | 3 | 17 | 3 | – | – | 530 | 73 |
| Miguel Ángel Fuentes | 1987 | 2001 | 439 | 7 | 42 | 3 | 14 | 2 | – | – | 495 | 12 |
| Roberto López Ufarte | 1975 | 1987 | 363 | 101 | 76 | 23 | 17 | 1 | 18 | 2 | 474 | 58 |
| Agustín Gajate | 1977 | 1992 | 364 | 13 | 76 | 3 | 20 | 3 | 9 | 0 | 469 | 19 |
| Inaxio Kortabarria | 1971 | 1985 | 355 | 16 | 62 | 5 | 18 | 0 | 8 | 1 | 443 | 22 |
| **Mikel Oyarzabal** | 2015 | 2026 | 349 | 100 | 47 | 20 | 40 | 12 | 1 | 1 | 437 | 133 |
| Mikel Aranburu | 1996 | 2012 | 402 (Note: includes 105 Segunda División appearances.) | 31 (Note: includes 9 Segunda División goals.) | 16 | 1 | 7 | 0 | – | – | 425 | 32 |
| Dionisio Urreisti | 1962 | 1977 | 349 (Note: includes 116 Segunda División appearances.) | 61 (Note: includes 38 Segunda División goals.) | 59 | 14 | 6 | 1 | – | – | 416 | 76 |
| Loren | 1984; 1993 | 1989; 2002 | 354 | 33 | 38 | 4 | 17 | 3 | 2 | 1 | 411 | 41 |
| Alberto López | 1992 | 2006 | 346 | 0 | 23 | 0 | 8 | 0 | – | – | 377 | 0 |
| Jesús María Satrústegui | 1973 | 1986 | 297 | 133 | 55 | 20 | 17 | 10 | 6 | 0 | 375 | 163 |
| Sebastián Ontoria | 1941 | 1955 | 315 (Note: includes 110 Segunda División appearances.) | 96 (Note: includes 55 Segunda División goals.) | 48 | 11 | – | – | 12 | 7 | 375 | 114 |
| José María Martínez | 1963 | 1976 | 321 (Note: includes 86 Segunda División appearances.) | 0 | 46 | 0 | 4 | 0 | 2 | 0 | 373 | 0 |
| José María Pérez | 1942 | 1955 | 302 (Note: includes 111 Segunda División appearances.) | 65 (Note: includes 26 Segunda División goals.) | 49 | 14 | – | – | 4 | 0 | 355 | 79 |
| Agustín Aranzábal | 1992 | 2004 | 322 | 5 | 16 | 0 | 13 | 0 | – | – | 351 | 5 |
| José Diego | 1974 | 1985 | 264 | 16 | 55 | 5 | 21 | 1 | 8 | 1 | 348 | 23 |
| Francisco Gorriti | 1966 | 1977 | 296 | 4 | 42 | 0 | 4 | 0 | – | – | 340 | 69 |
| José Antonio Arzak | 1962 | 1975 | 295 (Note: includes 131 Segunda División appearances.) | 62 | 43 | 7 | – | – | 2 | 0 | 340 | 69 |
| Aitor López Rekarte | 1994 | 2007 | 316 | 4 | 11 | 0 | 11 | 0 | – | – | 338 | 4 |
| **Igor Zubeldia** | 2015 | 2026 | 260 | 3 | 33 | 2 | 37 | 0 | 1 | 0 | 331 | 5 |
| Julio Olaizola | 1975 | 1985 | 250 | 2 | 55 | 0 | 16 | 0 | 6 | 0 | 327 | 2 |
| Javier de Pedro | 1993 | 2004 | 304 | 45 | 15 | 4 | 6 | 3 | – | – | 325 | 52 |
| **Aritz Elustondo** | 2014 | 2026 | 243 | 11 | 35 | 0 | 35 | 1 | 0 | 0 | 313 | 12 |
| José Antonio Pikabea | 1991 | 2003 | 292 | 10 | 19 | 0 | 2 | 0 | – | – | 313 | 10 |
| **Álex Remiro** | 2019 | 2026 | 246 | 0 | 25 | 0 | 37 | 0 | 1 | 0 | 309 | 0 |
| Rafael Mendiluce | 1961 | 1973 | 267 (Note: includes 108 Segunda División appearances.) | 29 (Note: includes 18 Segunda División goals.) | 40 | 3 | – | – | – | – | 309 | 32 |
| Gaztelu | 1966 | 1981 | 257 (Note: includes 4 Segunda División appearances.) | 28 | 40 | 5 | 9 | 0 | 2 | 0 | 308 | 33 |
| David Zurutuza | 2008 | 2020 | 267 (Note: includes 29 Segunda División appearances.) | 20 (Note: includes 4 Segunda División goals.) | 22 | 0 | 9 | 2 | – | – | 303 | 22 |
| Genaro Celayeta | 1978 | 1986 | 229 | 5 | 46 | 1 | 15 | 0 | 12 | 0 | 302 | 6 |
| Óscar de Paula | 1995 | 2006 | 273 | 57 | 16 | 1 | 11 | 2 | – | – | 300 | 60 |
| Mikel González | 2005 | 2017 | 277 (Note: includes 96 Segunda División appearances.) | 4 (Note: includes 1 Segunda División goal.) | 18 | 2 | 5 | 0 | – | – | 300 | 6 |
| Marco Antonio Boronat | 1966 | 1977 | 252 (Note: includes 27 Segunda División appearances.) | 39 (Note: includes 8 Segunda División goals.) | 36 | 9 | 5 | 0 | 2 | 1 | 295 | 49 |
| José María Bakero | 1980 | 1988 | 223 | 67 | 43 | 21 | 14 | 1 | 8 | 1 | 288 | 90 |
| Darko Kovacevic | 1996 | 2007 | 261 | 92 | 10 | 5 | 13 | 10 | – | – | 284 | 107 |
| Alberto Ormaetxea | 1959 | 1973 | 239 (Note: includes 128 Segunda División appearances.) | 2 | 40 | 0 | – | – | – | – | 280 | 2 |
| Jokin Uria | 1985 | 1997 | 223 | 9 | 37 | 2 | 8 | 0 | 5 | 0 | 273 | 11 |
| Imanol Agirretxe | 2004 | 2019 | 246 (Note: includes 66 Segunda División appearances.) | 71 | 14 | 4 | 12 | 0 | – | – | 272 | 75 |
| Ángel Paz | 1950 | 1962 | 227 | 55 | 32 | 8 | – | – | – | – | 269 | 68 |
| Patri | 1940 | 1952 | 199 (Note: includes 113 Segunda División appearances.) | 7 (Note: includes 7 Segunda División goals.) | 45 | 0 | – | – | 17 | 0 | 261 | 7 |
| Pedro Uralde | 1978 | 1986 | 181 | 61 | 43 | 20 | 15 | 5 | 17 | 11 | 256 | 97 |
| Santiago Idígoras | 1974 | 1981 | 204 | 39 | 38 | 6 | 13 | 0 | – | – | 255 | 45 |
| Iñigo Idiakez | 1992 | 2002 | 233 | 33 | 19 | 3 | 2 | 0 | – | – | 254 | 36 |
| Asier Illarramendi | 2009 | 2023 | 221 (Note: includes 1 Segunda División appearance.) | 11 | 18 | 0 | 14 | 0 | – | – | 253 | 11 |
| Carlos Vela | 2011 | 2018 | 219 | 66 | 19 | 4 | 12 | 3 | – | – | 250 | 73 |
| Aitor Begiristain | 1982 | 1988 | 187 | 23 | 41 | 9 | 4 | 1 | 16 | 2 | 248 | 35 |
| Andoni Elizondo | 1952 | 1964 | 201 (Note: includes 3 Segunda División appearances.) | 3 | 30 | 2 | – | – | 12 | 1 | 243 | 6 |
| Mikel Merino | 2018 | 2024 | 190 | 20 | 23 | 4 | 28 | 3 | 1 | 0 | 242 | 27 |
| Fermín Gordejuela | 1953 | 1962 | 203 | 11 | 27 | 3 | – | – | 12 | 0 | 242 | 14 |
| Iñigo Martínez | 2011 | 2018 | 205 | 16 | 20 | 1 | 14 | 0 | – | – | 239 | 17 |
| Claudio Bravo | 2006 | 2014 | 229 (Note: includes 57 Segunda División appearances.) | 1 | 1 | 0 | 7 | 0 | – | – | 237 | 1 |
| Martín Zubimendi | 2019 | 2025 | 180 | 9 | 21 | 0 | 34 | 1 | 1 | 0 | 236 | 10 |
| **Ander Barrenetxea** | 2018 | 2026 | 180 | 16 | 25 | 8 | 28 | 4 | 1 | 0 | 234 | 28 |
| Ion Ansotegi | 2005 | 2016 | 208 (Note: includes 84 Segunda División appearances.) | 11 (Note: includes 5 Segunda División goals.) | 15 | 0 | 3 | 0 | – | – | 226 | 11 |
| Robin Le Normand | 2018 | 2024 | 167 | 4 | 28 | 1 | 25 | 1 | 1 | 0 | 221 | 6 |
| Andoni Imaz | 1991 | 1998 | 197 | 7 | 22 | 0 | 2 | 0 | – | – | 221 | 7 |
| Alberto de la Bella | 2009 | 2019 | 189 (Note: includes 30 Segunda División appearances.) | 6 | 11 | 0 | 18 | 2 | – | – | 218 | 8 |
| Markel Bergara | 2007 | 2017 | 195 | 3 | 6 | 0 | 11 | 1 | – | – | 212 | 4 |
| Luis Pérez | 1990 | 1999 | 185 | 24 | 25 | 4 | 1 | 0 | – | – | 210 | 28 |
| José María Marculeta | 1939 | 1953 | 170 (Note: includes 73 Segunda División appearances.) | 1 | 36 | 0 | – | – | 4 | 0 | 210 | 1 |
| Carlos Martínez | 2007 | 2018 | 195 (Note: includes 60 Segunda División appearances.) | 3 (Note: includes 2 Segunda División goals.) | 9 | 0 | 5 | 0 | – | – | 209 | 3 |
| José Ramón Esnaola | 1965 | 1973 | 181 (Note: includes 15 Segunda División appearances.) | 0 | 26 | 0 | – | – | – | – | 207 | 0 |
| Juan Bagur | 1947 | 1960 | 171 (Note: includes 26 Segunda División appearances.) | 0 | 28 | 0 | – | – | 5 | 0 | 204 | 0 |
| Periko Alonso | 1977 | 1982 | 152 | 25 | 40 | 9 | 10 | 1 | – | – | 202 | 35 |
| Antoine Griezmann | 2009 | 2014 | 180 (Note: includes 39 Segunda División appearances.) | 46 (Note: includes 6 Segunda División goals.) | 14 | 5 | 8 | 1 | – | – | 202 | 52 |
| José Antonio Irulegui | 1956 | 1965 | 177 | 1 | 24 | 0 | – | – | – | – | 201 | 1 |
| **Aihen Muñoz** | 2018 | 2026 | 148 | 1 | 26 | 1 | 25 | 0 | 0 | 0 | 199 | 2 |
| Ricardo Suárez | 1949 | 1956 | 172 | 0 | 24 | 0 | – | – | 3 | 0 | 199 | 0 |
| Ignacio Echarri | 1953 | 1964 | 173 (Note: includes 25 Segunda División appearances.) | 6 | 20 | 1 | – | – | 4 | 0 | 197 | 7 |
| Valeri Karpin | 1994 | 2005 | 180 | 36 | 6 | 1 | 8 | 0 | – | – | 194 | 37 |
| Rubén Pardo | 2011 | 2020 | 164 | 6 | 18 | 1 | 12 | 0 | – | – | 194 | 7 |
| José María Galardi | 1951 | 1961 | 163 | 7 | 21 | 2 | – | – | 8 | 0 | 192 | 9 |
| Joseba Zaldua | 2013 | 2022 | 152 | 1 | 22 | 0 | 15 | 0 | 1 | 0 | 190 | 1 |
| Luciano Murillo | 1972 | 1980 | 156 | 10 | 23 | 3 | 5 | 1 | – | – | 184 | 14 |
| Epi | 1935 | 1955 | 155 (Note: includes 20 Segunda División appearances.) | 61 (Note: includes 15 Segunda División goals.) | 19 | 5 | – | – | 5 | 2 | 183 | 68 |
| José Luis Lema | 1965 | 1974 | 163 (Note: includes 40 Segunda División appearances.) | 8 (Note: includes 3 Segunda División goals.) | 20 | 0 | – | – | – | – | 183 | 8 |
| Mikel Labaka | 2004 | 2011 | 173 (Note: includes 85 Segunda División appearances.) | 10 | 8 | 0 | – | – | – | – | 181 | 10 |
| Carmelo Amas | 1962 | 1976 | 146 (Note: includes 63 Segunda División appearances.) | 18 (Note: includes 12 Segunda División goals.) | 23 | 3 | – | – | – | – | 173 | 22 |
| Juan María Mujika | 1985 | 1990 | 128 | 11 | 26 | 2 | 11 | 0 | 6 | 3 | 171 | 16 |
| Gerónimo Rulli | 2014 | 2019 | 149 | 0 | 12 | 0 | 9 | 0 | – | – | 170 | 0 |
| Willian José | 2016 | 2021 | 143 | 52 | 14 | 4 | 12 | 6 | 1 | 0 | 170 | 62 |
| Adnan Januzaj | 2017 | 2022 | 132 | 15 | 15 | 6 | 20 | 2 | 1 | 0 | 168 | 23 |
| Gorka Elustondo | 2006 | 2015 | 144 (Note: includes 56 Segunda División appearances.) | 7 | 15 | 1 | 8 | 0 | – | – | 167 | 8 |
| Brais Méndez | 2022 | 2026 | 122 | 22 | 17 | 4 | 27 | 7 | – | – | 166 | 33 |
| Eliseo Murillo | 1977 | 1985 | 116 | 0 | 34 | 0 | 9 | 0 | 6 | 0 | 165 | 0 |
| **Takefusa Kubo** | 2022 | 2026 | 125 | 23 | 13 | 0 | 26 | 2 | – | – | 164 | 25 |
| Sergio Canales | 2013 | 2018 | 135 | 9 | 15 | 2 | 11 | 1 | – | – | 161 | 12 |
| Pedrín | 1939 | 1946 | 116 (Note: includes 85 Segunda División appearances.) | 53 (Note: includes 46 Segunda División goals.) | 26 | 8 | – | – | 16 | 5 | 159 | 66 |
| José María Lumbreras | 1989 | 1996 | 138 | 3 | 13 | 0 | 6 | 2 | – | – | 157 | 5 |
| Amadeo | 1928 | 1935 | 114 | 2 | 43 | 1 | – | – | – | – | 157 | 3 |
| Ignacio Eizaguirre | 1939 | 1956 | 121 (Note: includes 14 Segunda División appearances.) | 0 | 22 | 0 | – | – | 13 | 0 | 156 | 0 |
| José Luis González | 1983 | 1992 | 134 | 0 | 16 | 0 | 4 | 0 | – | – | 154 | 0 |
| Juan Cacho | 1959 | 1967 | 138 (Note: includes 85 Segunda División appearances.) | 25 (Note: includes 19 Segunda División goals.) | 16 | 1 | – | – | – | – | 154 | 26 |
| Javier Sagarzazu | 1982 | 1987 | 117 | 0 | 24 | 0 | – | – | 13 | 0 | 154 | 0 |
| Bittor Alkiza | 1991; 2003 | 1994; 2005 | 130 | 11 | 15 | 6 | 7 | 0 | – | – | 153 | 17 |
| Dani Estrada | 2006 | 2015 | 139 (Note: includes 61 Segunda División appearances.) | 3 | 12 | 0 | 2 | 0 | – | – | 153 | 3 |
| Peporro | 1950 | 1961 | 131 | 4 | 12 | 0 | – | – | 10 | 0 | 153 | 4 |
| José María Araquistain | 1969 | 1977 | 132 | 37 | 15 | 2 | 4 | 0 | – | – | 151 | 39 |
| Igor Jauregi | 1998 | 2007 | 135 | 7 | 5 | 0 | 10 | 0 | – | – | 150 | 7 |
| Cholín | 1928 | 1940 | 104 (Note: includes 10 Segunda División appearances.) | 58 | 43 | 24 | – | – | 3 | 0 | 150 | 82 |
| José Antonio Corcuera | 1966 | 1975 | 128 | 12 | 20 | 3 | 1 | 0 | – | – | 149 | 15 |
| Martín Marculeta | 1925 | 1934 | 106 | 4 | 42 | 12 | – | – | – | – | 148 | 16 |
| Meho Kodro | 1991 | 1995 | 129 | 73 | 15 | 8 | 2 | 0 | – | – | 146 | 81 |
| Andoni Gorosabel | 2017 | 2023 | 114 | 0 | 12 | 0 | 19 | 0 | 1 | 0 | 146 | 0 |
| Juan Ignacio Lasa | 1960 | 1968 | 114 (Note: includes 74 Segunda División appearances.) | 6 | 29 | 0 | – | – | – | – | 143 | 6 |
| Nihat | 2001 | 2006 | 133 | 58 | 1 | 0 | 8 | 0 | – | – | 142 | 58 |
| Antonio Ansola | 1953 | 1961 | 116 | 0 | 17 | 0 | – | – | 8 | 0 | 141 | 0 |
| Igor Gabilondo | 2000 | 2006 | 129 | 13 | 5 | 2 | 6 | 1 | – | – | 140 | 16 |
| Paco Bienzobas | 1927 | 1942 | 91 (Note: includes 21 Segunda División appearances.) | 53 (Note: includes 13 Segunda División goals.) | 45 | 18 | – | – | 4 | 0 | 140 | 71 |
| Silvestre Igoa | 1950 | 1956 | 116 | 58 | 14 | 3 | – | – | 7 | 9 | 137 | 70 |
| Portu | 2019 | 2022 | 109 | 16 | 12 | 1 | 15 | 1 | 1 | 0 | 137 | 18 |
| Adolfo Sarasqueta | 1952 | 1960 | 115 | 30 | 17 | 8 | – | – | 4 | 0 | 136 | 40 |
| **Beñat Turrientes** | 2021 | 2026 | 91 | 0 | 18 | 3 | 23 | 0 | – | – | 132 | 4 |
| Alexander Isak | 2019 | 2022 | 105 | 33 | 12 | 8 | 14 | 3 | 1 | 0 | 132 | 44 |
| Imanol | 1990 | 1998 | 113 | 7 | 16 | 0 | 2 | 0 | – | – | 131 | 7 |
| Fernando Murillo | 1947 | 1954 | 116 (Note: includes 22 Segunda División appearances.) | 1 | 15 | 0 | – | – | – | – | 131 | 1 |
| Asier Riesgo | 2001 | 2010 | 127 (Note: includes 49 Segunda División appearances.) | 0 | 3 | 0 | – | – | – | – | 130 | 0 |
| José María Izaga | 1935 | 1944 | 83 | 0 | 24 | 0 | – | – | 22 | 0 | 129 | 1 |
| Diego Rivas | 2006 | 2011 | 124 (Note: includes 71 Segunda División appearances.) | 3 | 5 | 0 | – | – | – | – | 129 | 3 |
| Javier Bengoetxea | 1985 | 1991 | 101 | 0 | 16 | 0 | 10 | 0 | 1 | 0 | 128 | 0 |
| Juan Gómez | 1996 | 2000 | 111 | 0 | 10 | 0 | 6 | 0 | – | – | 127 | 0 |
| Eustaquio Zubillaga | 1953 | 1960 | 108 | 18 | 13 | 5 | – | – | 5 | 2 | 127 | 25 |
| Alberto Albístegi | 1984 | 1998 | 115 | 6 | 11 | 0 | – | – | – | – | 126 | 6 |
| Román Galarraga | 1943 | 1950 | 111 (Note: includes 75 Segunda División appearances.) | 0 | 13 | 0 | – | – | 1 | 0 | 125 | 0 |
| Xabi Alonso | 2000 | 2004 | 114 | 9 | 2 | 0 | 8 | 1 | – | – | 124 | 10 |
| Salva Iriarte | 1973 | 1982 | 94 | 3 | 28 | 8 | 2 | 0 | – | – | 124 | 11 |
| José Araquistain | 1954 | 1961 | 106 | 0 | 14 | 0 | – | – | 3 | 0 | 123 | 0 |
| Gari Uranga | 2001 | 2008 | 116 (Note: includes 34 Segunda División appearances.) | 9 | 7 | 0 | – | – | – | – | 123 | 9 |
| Javi Gracia | 1995 | 1999 | 106 | 12 | 10 | 0 | 3 | 1 | – | – | 119 | 13 |
| Ignacio Bidegain | 1939 | 1946 | 81 (Note: includes 35 Segunda División appearances.) | 26 | 21 | 7 | – | – | 17 | 3 | 119 | 36 |
| José Javier Zubillaga | 1981 | 1987 | 80 | 5 | 19 | 0 | 7 | 0 | 12 | 0 | 118 | 5 |
| Chori Castro | 2012 | 2016 | 94 | 12 | 12 | 0 | 10 | 0 | – | – | 116 | 12 |
| Tomás Orbegozo | 1981 | 1985 | 85 | 1 | 19 | 1 | 4 | 0 | 7 | 0 | 115 | 2 |
| Luis López Rekarte | 1985 | 1988 | 92 | 2 | 18 | 1 | 4 | 0 | – | – | 114 | 3 |
| Miguel Ayestaran | 1929 | 1935 | 95 | 6 | 19 | 0 | – | – | – | – | 114 | 6 |
| Juanmi | 2016 | 2019 | 95 | 24 | 12 | 6 | 6 | 1 | – | – | 113 | 31 |
| Nemesio Arana | 1927 | 1936 | 94 (Note: includes 13 Segunda División appearances.) | 0 | 19 | 0 | – | – | – | – | 113 | 0 |
| Dmitri Khokhlov | 1999 | 2003 | 111 | 14 | 2 | 1 | – | – | – | – | 113 | 15 |
| José Antonio Urtiaga | 1968 | 1973 | 96 | 22 | 14 | 4 | – | – | – | – | 110 | 26 |
| Mikel Alonso | 2000 | 2009 | 104 | 2 | 6 | 2 | – | – | – | – | 110 | 4 |
| Carlos Xavier | 1991 | 1994 | 96 | 13 | 11 | 0 | 2 | 0 | – | – | 109 | 13 |
| **Jon Aramburu** | 2023 | 2026 | 81 | 2 | 17 | 0 | 10 | 0 | – | – | 108 | 2 |
| Oceano | 1991 | 1994 | 96 | 17 | 9 | 3 | 2 | 0 | – | – | 107 | 20 |
| Pedro María Laguardia | 1953 | 1960 | 85 | 34 | 15 | 8 | – | – | 3 | 0 | 103 | 42 |
| Fernando Terán | 1934 | 1944 | 65 | 44 (Note: includes 31 Segunda División goals.) | 15 | 7 | – | – | 22 | 17 | 102 | 68 |
| Ander Guevara | 2019 | 2023 | 71 | 1 | 16 | 0 | 13 | 1 | 1 | 0 | 101 | 2 |
| José Antonio Uranga | 1972 | 1978 | 76 | 0 | 20 | 0 | 5 | 0 | – | – | 101 | 0 |
| José Luis Maiztegui | 1961 | 1967 | 83 (Note: includes 73 Segunda División appearances.) | 0 | 18 | 0 | – | – | – | – | 101 | 1 |
| José María Castivia | 1946 | 1952 | 80 (Note: includes 32 Segunda División appearances.) | 28 | 19 | 6 | – | – | 1 | 1 | 100 | 35 |
| Enrique Silvestre | 1967 | 1972 | 84 | 17 | 16 | 4 | – | – | – | – | 100 | 21 |
| Gerardo | 2006 | 2009 | 96 (Note: includes 66 Segunda División appearances.) | 3 | 4 | 0 | – | – | – | – | 100 | 3 |

== See also ==
- List of Basque footballers
