= 1982 FIFA World Cup Group B =

Football tournament group stage

Group B was one of four groups of national teams competing in the second stage of the 1982 FIFA World Cup. The group's three matches were staged at the Santiago Bernabéu in Madrid. The group consisted of three teams advancing from the first group stage: Group 2 winners West Germany, Group 5 runners-up, the host nation Spain, and Group 4 winners England. England finished the group without scoring or conceding a single goal, the only time that has ever happened in any kind of group in FIFA World Cup history. Like Scotland in '74 and Brazil in '78, Three Lions of '82 stayed unbeaten but were eliminated before the semi-finals. Their elimination was the result of only managing a goalless draw against already-eliminated Spain in the final group match, though even a win would not have kept England in the competition unless it was by at least two clear goals.

West Germany topped the group and advanced to the semi-finals.

== Qualified teams ==
The winners of Group 2 and 4 and the runner-up of Group 5 qualified for Group B of the second round.

| Group | Winners |
|---|---|
| 2 | West Germany |
| 4 | England |
| Group | Runners-up |
| 5 | Spain |

== Standings ==
| Pos | Team | Pld | W | D | L | GF | GA | GD | Pts | Qualification |
|---|---|---|---|---|---|---|---|---|---|---|
| 1 | West Germany | 2 | 1 | 1 | 0 | 2 | 1 | +1 | 3 | Advance to knockout stage |
| 2 | England | 2 | 0 | 2 | 0 | 0 | 0 | 0 | 2 | |
| 3 | Spain (H) | 2 | 0 | 1 | 1 | 1 | 2 | −1 | 1 | |

Source: FIFA
(H) Hosts

== Matches ==
=== West Germany vs England ===
29 June 1982
21:00 CEST

| West Germany | 0–0 | England |

Santiago Bernabéu, Madrid
Attendance: 75,000
Referee: Arnaldo Cézar Coelho (Brazil)

| West Germany | England |

| GK | 1 | Toni Schumacher |
| SW | 15 | Uli Stielike | (yellow card) 68' |
| DF | 20 | Manfred Kaltz |
| DF | 4 | Karlheinz Förster |
| DF | 2 | Hans-Peter Briegel |
| MF | 6 | Wolfgang Dremmler |
| MF | 5 | Bernd Förster |
| MF | 3 | Paul Breitner |
| MF | 10 | Hansi Müller | | (substituted off) 73' |
| FW | 13 | Uwe Reinders | | (substituted off) 62' |
| FW | 11 | Karl-Heinz Rummenigge (c) |
Substitutes:
| GK | 21 | Bernd Franke |
| MF | 7 | Pierre Littbarski | | (substituted on) 62' |
| FW | 8 | Klaus Fischer | | (substituted on) 73' |
| DF | 12 | Wilfried Hannes |
| MF | 18 | Lothar Matthäus |
Manager:
Jupp Derwall

| GK | 22 | Peter Shilton |
| RB | 12 | Mick Mills (c) |
| CB | 18 | Phil Thompson |
| CB | 4 | Terry Butcher |
| LB | 17 | Kenny Sansom |
| RM | 5 | Steve Coppell |
| CM | 19 | Ray Wilkins |
| CM | 16 | Bryan Robson |
| LM | 15 | Graham Rix |
| CF | 8 | Trevor Francis | (substituted off) 76' |
| CF | 11 | Paul Mariner |
Substitutes:
| GK | 1 | Ray Clemence |
| MF | 9 | Glenn Hoddle |
| DF | 14 | Phil Neal |
| FW | 20 | Peter Withe |
| FW | 21 | Tony Woodcock | (substituted on) 76' |
Manager:
Ron Greenwood

Assistant referees:
Héctor Ortiz (Paraguay)
Rómulo Méndez (Guatemala)

=== West Germany vs Spain ===
2 July 1982
21:00 CEST

| West Germany | 2–1 | Spain |
|---|---|---|
| Littbarski 50'; Fischer 75' | | Zamora 82' |

Santiago Bernabéu, Madrid
Attendance: 90,089
Referee: Paolo Casarin (Italy)

| West Germany | Spain |

| GK | 1 | Toni Schumacher |
| SW | 15 | Uli Stielike |
| RB | 20 | Manfred Kaltz |
| CB | 4 | Karlheinz Förster |
| LB | 5 | Bernd Förster |
| RM | 6 | Wolfgang Dremmler |
| CM | 3 | Paul Breitner |
| LM | 2 | Hans-Peter Briegel | (yellow card) 84' |
| CF | 11 | Karl-Heinz Rummenigge (c) | | (substituted off) 46' |
| FW | 8 | Klaus Fischer | (yellow card) 10' |
| LW | 7 | Pierre Littbarski |
Substitutes:
| GK | 22 | Eike Immel |
| FW | 9 | Horst Hrubesch |
| DF | 12 | Wilfried Hannes |
| FW | 13 | Uwe Reinders | | (substituted on) 46' |
| MF | 14 | Felix Magath |
Manager:
Jupp Derwall

| GK | 1 | Luis Arconada (c) |
| SW | 6 | José Ramón Alexanko | (yellow card) 9' |
| RB | 12 | Santiago Urquiaga |
| CB | 5 | Miguel Tendillo |
| LB | 3 | Rafael Gordillo |
| RW | 7 | Juanito | | (substituted off) 46' |
| CM | 2 | José Antonio Camacho | (yellow card) 83' |
| CM | 4 | Periko Alonso |
| LM | 10 | Jesús María Zamora |
| CF | 19 | Santillana |
| FW | 20 | Quini | | (substituted off) 65' |
Substitutes:
| GK | 22 | Miguel Ángel |
| FW | 9 | Jesús María Satrústegui |
| FW | 11 | Roberto López Ufarte | | (substituted on) 46' |
| DF | 14 | Antonio Maceda |
| MF | 16 | Tente Sánchez | (yellow card) 84' | (substituted on) 65' |
Manager:
José Santamaría

Assistant referees:
Franz Wöhrer (Austria)
Károly Palotai (Hungary)

=== Spain vs England ===
5 July 1982
21:00 CEST

| Spain | 0–0 | England |

Santiago Bernabéu, Madrid
Attendance: 75,000
Referee: Alexis Ponnet (Belgium)

| Spain | England |

| GK | 1 | Luis Arconada (c) |
| DF | 12 | Santiago Urquiaga |
| DF | 5 | Miguel Tendillo | (substituted off) 72' |
| DF | 6 | José Ramón Alexanko |
| DF | 2 | José Antonio Camacho |
| MF | 4 | Periko Alonso |
| MF | 10 | Jesús María Zamora |
| MF | 15 | Enrique Saura | (substituted off) 67' |
| MF | 3 | Rafael Gordillo |
| FW | 9 | Jesús María Satrústegui |
| FW | 19 | Santillana |
Substitutes:
| GK | 22 | Miguel Ángel |
| FW | 11 | Roberto López Ufarte |
| DF | 13 | Manuel Jiménez |
| DF | 14 | Antonio Maceda | (substituted on) 72' |
| FW | 18 | Pedro Uralde | (substituted on) 67' |
Manager:
José Santamaría

| GK | 22 | Peter Shilton |
| RB | 12 | Mick Mills (c) |
| CB | 18 | Phil Thompson |
| CB | 4 | Terry Butcher |
| LB | 17 | Kenny Sansom |
| RM | 8 | Trevor Francis |
| CM | 19 | Ray Wilkins | (yellow card) 15' |
| CM | 16 | Bryan Robson |
| LM | 15 | Graham Rix | | (substituted off) 63' |
| CF | 11 | Paul Mariner |
| CF | 21 | Tony Woodcock | | (substituted off) 64' |
Substitutes:
| GK | 1 | Ray Clemence |
| AM | 3 | Trevor Brooking | | (substituted on) 63' |
| CF | 7 | Kevin Keegan | | (substituted on) 64' |
| MF | 9 | Glenn Hoddle |
| DF | 14 | Phil Neal |
Manager:
Ron Greenwood

Assistant referees:
Michel Vautrot (France)
Belaïd Lacarne (Algeria)

== See also ==
- England at the FIFA World Cup
- Germany at the FIFA World Cup
- Spain at the FIFA World Cup
