= 1982 Supercopa de España =

Real Madrid	Real Sociedad
(Spain)	(Spain)
1	4
- on aggregate

First leg
Real Madrid	Real Sociedad
1	0
- Date: 13 October 1982
- Venue: Santiago Bernabéu, Madrid
- Referee: José María Enríquez Negreira

Second leg
Real Sociedad	Real Madrid
4	0
- Date: 28 December 1982
- Venue: Atocha, San Sebastián
- Referee: José Donato Pes Pérez

The 1982 Supercopa de España consisted of a two-legged Spanish football pair of matches played on 13 October 1982 and 28 December 1982 (played in Madrid and in San Sebastian) with the winner determined by the aggregate score.

- League winners: Real Sociedad
- Cup winners: Real Madrid

== Match details ==
=== First leg ===
13 October 1982
21:00 CET

Real Madrid	1–0	Real Sociedad
Metgod 44'

Santiago Bernabéu, Madrid
Attendance: 45,000
Referee: José María Enríquez Negreira

Real Madrid	Real Sociedad

GK	1	(Spain) Agustín
DF		(Spain) Juan José	(yellow card) 69'
DF		(Netherlands) Johnny Metgod
DF		(Spain) Francisco Bonet
DF		(Spain) José Antonio Camacho
MF		(Spain) Ángel	(yellow card) 68'
MF		(Spain) Ricardo Gallego	(yellow card) 5'	(substituted off) 83'
MF		(West Germany) Uli Stielike	(yellow card) 34'
FW		(Spain) Juanito	(yellow card) 22' (red card) 22'
FW		(Spain) Santillana
FW		(Spain) Ito		(substituted off) 46'
Substitutes:
DF		(Spain) Alfonso Fraile		(substituted on) 83'
FW		(Spain) Isidro		(substituted on) 46'
Manager:
(Argentina) Alfredo Di Stéfano

GK	1	(Spain) Luis Arconada
DF		(Spain) Eliseo Murillo		(substituted off) 57'
DF		(Spain) Iñaki Cortabarría	(yellow card) 74'
DF		(Spain) Alberto Górriz	(yellow card) 85'
DF		(Spain) Julio Olaizola	(yellow card) 29'
MF		(Spain) Genaro Celayeta	(yellow card) 83'
MF		(Spain) Javier Zubillaga
MF		(Spain) Jesús María Zamora	(yellow card) 26'
FW		(Spain) Pedro Uralde	(yellow card) 55'	(substituted off) 76'
FW		(Spain) Jesús María Satrústegui
FW		(Spain) Roberto López Ufarte
Substitutes:
MF		(Spain) Diego		(substituted on) 57'
FW		(Spain) José Mari Bakero		(substituted on) 76'
Manager:
(Spain) Alberto Ormaetxea

=== Second leg ===
28 December 1982
20:00 CET

Real Sociedad	4–0 (a.e.t.)	Real Madrid
Uralde 53', 103'; López Ufarte 91'; Salguero 104' (o.g.)

Estadio Atocha, San Sebastián
Attendance: 30,000
Referee: José Donato Pes Pérez

Real Sociedad	Real Madrid

GK	1	(Spain) Luis Arconada	(yellow card) 22'
DF		(Spain) Eliseo Murillo		(substituted off) 73'
DF		(Spain) Agustín Gajate	(yellow card) 63'
DF		(Spain) Genaro Celayeta
DF		(Spain) Alberto Górriz
MF		(Spain) Diego		(substituted off) 61'
MF		(Spain) Juan Antonio Larrañaga	(yellow card) 74'
MF		(Spain) Tomás Orbegozo
FW		(Spain) José Mari Bakero	(yellow card) 14'
FW		(Spain) Pedro Uralde
FW		(Spain) Roberto López Ufarte	(yellow card) 22'
Substitutes:
MF		(Spain) Txiki Beguiristáin		(substituted on) 73'
FW		(Spain) Luis Sukia		(substituted on) 61'
Manager:
(Spain) Alberto Ormaetxea				(yellow card) 22'

GK	1	(Spain) Agustín
DF	(Spain) Juan José	(red card) 22'
DF	(Spain) Francisco Bonet
DF	(Netherlands) Johnny Metgod
DF	(Spain) José Antonio Camacho
MF	(Spain) Ángel	(red card) 71'
MF	(Spain) Ricardo Gallego
MF	(Spain) Alfonso Fraile
FW	(Spain) Miguel Ángel Portugal	(substituted off) 61'
FW	(Spain) Francisco Pineda	(substituted off) 81'
FW	(Spain) Isidro	(yellow card) 53'
Substitutes:
DF	(Spain) Isidoro San José	(substituted on) 61'
DF	(Spain) José Antonio Salguero	(substituted on) 81'
Manager:
(Argentina) Alfredo Di Stéfano

Supercopa de España
1982 Winners
Real Sociedad
First Title

== See also ==
- 1982–83 La Liga
- 1982–83 Copa del Rey
- 1982–83 Real Madrid CF season
