= Inaxio Kortabarria =

Spanish footballer

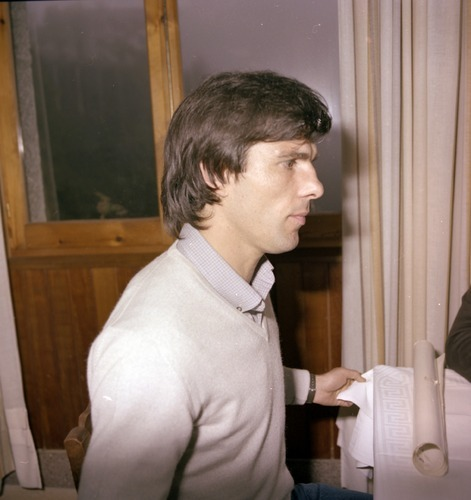
- Kortabarria in 1981

Personal information
- Full name: Inaxio Kortabarria Abarrategi
- Date of birth: 31 July 1950 (age 76)
- Place of birth: Mondragón, Spain
- Height: 1.82 m (6 ft 0 in)
- Position: Centre-back

Youth career
- Real Sociedad

Senior career*
Years	Team	Apps	(Gls)
1968–1971	San Sebastián	77	(1)
1971–1985	Real Sociedad	355	(16)
Total		432	(17)

International career
1974–1976	Spain amateur	4	(0)
1976–1977	Spain	4	(0)
1979	Basque Country	2	(0)

Managerial career
- 1995–1996: Real Sociedad B
- * Club domestic league appearances and goals

Inaxio Kortabarria Abarrategi (born 31 July 1950) is a Spanish former professional footballer who played as a central defender.

== Club career ==
Kortabarria was born in Mondragón, Gipuzkoa. During his career he played solely for Real Sociedad, making his first-team – and La Liga – debut on 19 September 1971 against Deportivo de La Coruña and finishing his first season with 14 appearances.

From there onwards, Kortabarria rarely missed a game, contributing 30 and 31 matches respectively as the Basques won back-to-back leagues (whilst adding five and six goals, his career-bests) with him as captain. In the last round of the 1980–81 campaign, he opened the scoring through an early penalty as Real drew 2–2 at Sporting de Gijón to eventually edge Real Madrid on goal difference.

After losing his place to younger Agustín Gajate, Alberto Górriz and Juan Antonio Larrañaga, all brought up in the club's youth academy, Kortabarria chose to retire at the end of 1984–85 aged 35. He made 442 appearances in all competitions, eighth all-time for Real Sociedad.

== International career ==
Kortabarria earned four caps for Spain in ten months. His debut came on 22 May 1976, in a 2–0 loss in West Germany for the UEFA Euro 1976's qualifying stages.

== Political views ==
On 5 December 1976, before a game against Athletic Bilbao, Kortabarria and the opposing captain, José Ángel Iribar, carried out the Ikurriña, the Basque flag, and placed it ceremonially on the centre-circle. This was the first public display of the flag since the death of Francisco Franco, but it was still illegal.

== Honours ==
- La Liga: 1980–81, 1981–82
- Supercopa de España: 1982

== See also ==
- List of one-club men
