= Araquistáin =

Araquistáin (Basque: Arakistain) is a Spanish surname of Basque origin. Notable people with this surname include:

- José Araquistáin (1937–2025), Spanish footballer
- José María Araquistain (born 1948), Spanish footballer
- Luis Araquistáin (1886–1959), Spanish politician and writer
