= Vicente Biurrun =

Spanish footballer

Personal information
- Full name: José Vicente Fernández Biurrun
- Date of birth: 1 September 1959 (age 67)
- Place of birth: São Paulo, Brazil
- Height: 1.81 m (5 ft 11 1/2 in)
- Position: Goalkeeper

Youth career
- Danak
- Real Sociedad

Senior career*
Years	Team	Apps	(Gls)
1977–1981	Real Sociedad B	78	(0)
1981–1983	Real Sociedad	0	(0)
1983–1986	Osasuna	60	(0)
1986–1990	Athletic Bilbao	151	(0)
1990–1993	Español	81	(0)
1993–1995	Real Sociedad	4	(0)
Total		374	(0)

International career
1990	Basque Country	1	(0)
- * Club domestic league appearances and goals

José Vicente Fernández Biurrun (born 1 September 1959) is a Spanish former professional footballer who played as a goalkeeper.

He appeared in 296 La Liga matches over 14 seasons, in representation of four teams.

== Club career ==
Born in São Paulo, Brazil, Biurrun was of Basque descent and moved to Spain at a young age. He started playing professionally with Real Sociedad (after appearing with the reserves in his senior beginnings) but, blocked by Spanish international Luis Arconada, he was forced to move and joined Navarrese neighbours CA Osasuna, being understudy to Francisco Vicuña in his first season and starting in the following two.

FC Barcelona took an option to purchase Biurrun, but in May 1986 they signed Athletic Bilbao's goalkeeper Andoni Zubizarreta instead and an agreement was reached for the former to join the Basque club as the latter's replacement. Deemed eligible to play for them due to his roots, he established himself as a La Liga player, rarely missing a match and playing a career-high 41 games in the 1986–87 campaign as his team finished in 13th position. Subsequently, he joined RCD Español as a replacement for the recently departed Thomas N'Kono.

Biurrun retired in 1995 at 35 after ending where he had started, Real Sociedad. He remained connected to the game as a players' agent.
