= Juan Carlos Vidal =

Spanish footballer

Personal information
- Full name: Juan Carlos Vidal Cruz
- Date of birth: 25 September 1954 (age 72)
- Place of birth: Bilbao, Spain
- Height: 1.79 m (5 ft 10 in)
- Position: Midfielder

Youth career
- San Mamés
- 1971–1972: Athletic Bilbao

Senior career*
Years	Team	Apps	(Gls)
1972–1974	Bilbao Athletic	35	(6)
1974–1979	Athletic Bilbao	53	(4)
1976–1977	→ Alavés (loan)	22	(3)
1979–1982	Hércules	92	(8)
Total		202	(21)
- * Club domestic league appearances and goals

Juan Carlos Vidal Cruz (born 25 September 1954) is a Spanish former professional footballer who played as a midfielder.

== Career ==
=== Club ===
Born in Bilbao, Biscay, Basque Country, Vidal played 145 matches in La Liga between 1972 and 1982, starting his career at hometown club Athletic Bilbao where he was not a first choice and suffered with injuries; he was loaned to second-tier Deportivo Alavés for the full 1976–77 season, meaning he took no part in Athletic's run to two major finals in the campaign.

He featured in the UEFA Cup with Athletic, including in a tie against AFC Ajax in 1978 where he 'scored' a goal which should not have been awarded: his shot struck the outside of the supporting stanchion and rebounded onto the field of play in a similar manner to a legitimate goal earlier in the match, and was mistakenly given by the referee (Ajax won the tie in any case).

Vidal then became an important member of the team at Hércules following an 8 million Ptas transfer in 1979, suffering relegation in his final season with the Alicante outfit in 1981–82. He is the only person to have played for both of his main clubs who scored goals for each against the other, finding the net for Athletic in 1975 and Hércules in 1981.

=== International ===
Vidal was never selected for the Spanish national team at any level. He did play in one friendly for the unofficial Basque Country representative team against the USSR in 1978.
