= Javier Zubillaga =

Spanish footballer

Personal information
- Full name: José Javier Zubillaga Martínez
- Date of birth: 12 August 1959 (age 67)
- Place of birth: Logroño, Spain
- Height: 1.73 m (5 ft 8 in)
- Position: Midfielder

Youth career
- Berceo
- Real Sociedad

Senior career*
Years	Team	Apps	(Gls)
1981–1987	Real Sociedad	80	(5)
1987–1991	Español	90	(4)
Total		170	(9)

International career
1976–1978	Spain U18	14	(2)

Managerial career
- 2001–2002: Real Unión
- 2005–2007: Real Unión
- 2007–2008: Lleida
- * Club domestic league appearances and goals

José Javier Zubillaga Martínez (born 12 August 1959 in Logroño, La Rioja) is a Spanish retired footballer who played as a midfielder.

== Football career ==
Zubillaga's father, Cesáreo (a native of San Sebastián), was a professional footballer who played for CD Logroñés in the Segunda Liga. Javier began playing youth football with Logroño-based CD Berceo, before joining Real Sociedad.

During his ten-year professional career, Zubillaga played with Real Sociedad and RCD Español. He won the La Liga title in the 1981–82 season with the former team, although he only contributed with eight games (184 minutes, no complete matches). Until 1987, year in which he helped the Basques conquer the Copa del Rey, he never played in more than 18 league matches, and left precisely in that summer.

Zubillaga then spent four years in Catalonia, experiencing one promotion and relegation each in consecutive seasons. He finally retired in 1991 at nearly 32, taking up coaching in the following decade, always in Segunda División B – he also worked with several clubs in directorial capacities from 1994 onwards, including hometown's CD Logroñés.

== Honours ==
Real Sociedad

- La Liga: 1981–82
- Copa del Rey: 1986–87
- Supercopa de España: 1982

Español

- UEFA Cup: Runner-up 1987–88
