= List of footballers with 400 or more La Liga appearances =

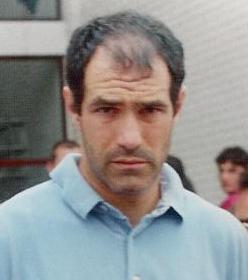
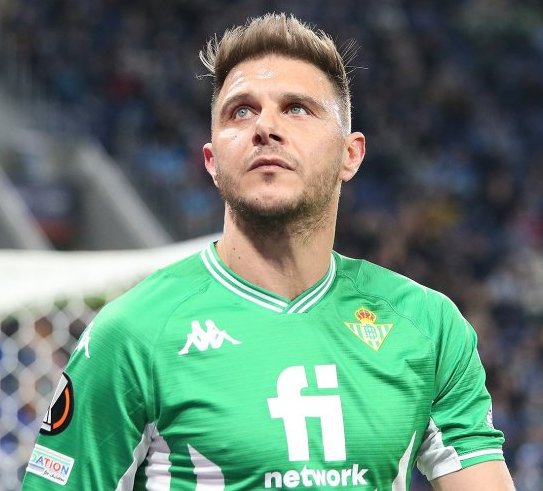
Andoni Zubizarreta (left) and Joaquín (right) hold the record for most appearances in La Liga history with 622 games.

This article outlines all footballers who have made at least 400 appearances in La Liga. Players in bold are still active in La Liga. Players in italics are still active outside La Liga.

== List of players ==
As of 22 November 2026

Rank	Player	Nationality	Apps	Goals	Club(s) (matches)
1	Andoni Zubizarreta	Spain	622	0	Athletic Bilbao (169); Barcelona (301); Valencia (152)
1	Joaquín	Spain	622	76	Real Betis (407); Valencia (158); Málaga (57)
3	Raúl García	Spain	609	112	Osasuna (101); Atlético Madrid (216); Athletic Bilbao (292)
4	Antoine Griezmann	France	564	205	Real Sociedad (141); Atlético Madrid (349); Barcelona (74)
5	Dani Parejo	Spain	558	78	Real Madrid (5); Getafe (64); Valencia (282); Villarreal (207)
6	Raúl	Spain	550	228	Real Madrid
7	Eusebio	Spain	543	36	Valladolid (246); Atlético Madrid (27); Barcelona (203); Celta Vigo (67)
8	Francisco Buyo	Spain	542	0	Sevilla (199); Real Madrid (343)
9	Sergio Ramos	Spain	536	77	Sevilla (67); Real Madrid (469)
10	**Koke**	Spain	529	40	**Atlético Madrid**
11	Manuel Sanchís	Spain	523	33	Real Madrid
12	Lionel Messi	Argentina	520	474	Barcelona
13	Jesús Navas	Spain	516	26	Sevilla
14	Iker Casillas	Spain	510	0	Real Madrid
15	Xavi	Spain	505	58	Barcelona
16	Miquel Soler	Spain	504	12	Espanyol (118); Barcelona (81); Atlético Madrid (25); Sevilla (75); Real Madrid (14); Zaragoza (39); Mallorca (152)
17	Fernando Hierro	Spain	497	106	Valladolid (58); Real Madrid (439)
18	José Mari Bakero	Spain	483	139	Real Sociedad (223); Barcelona (260)
19	Loren	Spain	481	54	Real Sociedad (354); Athletic Bilbao (62); Real Burgos (65)
19	Sergio Busquets	Spain	481	11	Barcelona
21	Joaquín Alonso	Spain	479	65	Sporting Gijón (479)
22	José Ramón Esnaola	Spain	469	0	Real Sociedad (166); Real Betis (303)
23	José Ángel Iribar	Spain	466	0	Athletic Bilbao
23	Donato	Spain	466	49	Atlético Madrid (163); Deportivo La Coruña (303)
25	Miguel Ángel Nadal	Spain	463	34	Mallorca (255); Barcelona (208)
26	Santillana	Spain	461	186	Real Madrid
26	Alberto Górriz	Spain	461	14	Real Sociedad
28	Juan Antonio Larrañaga	Spain	460	15	Real Sociedad
29	Manuel Jiménez	Spain	458	8	Sporting Gijón (420); Real Burgos (38)
30	Jesús María Zamora	Spain	455	63	Real Sociedad
31	Cristóbal	Spain	454	14	Barcelona (31); Oviedo (137); Logroñés (72); Espanyol (214)
32	Aitor Begiristain	Spain	453	90	Real Sociedad (187); Barcelona (223); Deportivo La Coruña (43)
33	Joseba Etxeberria	Spain	452	90	Real Sociedad (7); Athletic Bilbao (445)
34	Diego	Spain	450	12	Real Betis (198); Sevilla (252)
35	Quini	Spain	448	219	Sporting Gijón (348); Barcelona (100)
36	Pedro Munitis	Spain	447	43	Real Madrid (53); Deportivo La Coruña (90); Racing Santander (304)
37	Ismael Urzaiz	Spain	445	131	Albacete (11); Celta Vigo (6); Rayo Vallecano (20); Espanyol (41); Athletic Bilbao (367)
38	Aritz Aduriz	Spain	443	158	Athletic Bilbao (316); Mallorca (69); Valencia (58)
39	Andrés Iniesta	Spain	442	35	Barcelona
40	Roberto	Spain	439	95	Valencia (258); Barcelona (144); Villarreal (37)
40	Miguel Ángel Fuentes	Spain	439	68	Real Sociedad
40	Karim Benzema	France	439	238	Real Madrid
43	Ivan Rakitić	Croatia	438	61	Sevilla (238); Barcelona (200)
44	Francisco Gento	Spain	437	128	Racing Santander (10); Real Madrid (427)
45	Francisco	Spain	436	42	Sevilla (258); Espanyol (178)
45	Dani Alves	Brazil	436	26	Sevilla (175); Barcelona (261)
47	Fran	Spain	435	44	Deportivo La Coruña
47	Óscar de Marcos	Spain	435	25	Athletic Bilbao
49	Iker Muniain	Spain	434	56	Athletic Bilbao
50	Gallego	Spain	433	26	Sevilla (185); Barcelona (248)
51	Patxi Salinas	Spain	432	11	Athletic Bilbao (239); Celta Vigo (193)
52	Eloy	Spain	430	77	Sporting Gijón (227); Valencia (203)
52	**Iago Aspas**	Spain	430	171	**Celta Vigo (414)**; Sevilla (16)
54	Gabi	Spain	429	20	Atlético Madrid (297); Getafe (32); Zaragoza (100)
55	Rafael Gordillo	Spain	428	38	Real Betis (246); Real Madrid (182)
56	Juanfran	Spain	427	16	Real Madrid (6); Espanyol (30); Osasuna (148); Atlético Madrid (243)
57	José María Lumbreras	Spain	423	19	Osasuna (223); Zaragoza (62); Real Sociedad (138)
58	Fernando	Spain	420	108	Valencia
58	Patxi Puñal	Spain	420	22	Osasuna
58	Santiago Cañizares	Spain	420	0	Celta Vigo (74); Real Madrid (41); Valencia (305)
58	**Iñaki Williams**	Ghana	420	88	**Athletic Bilbao**
62	Gerard Piqué	Spain	419	32	Zaragoza (22); Barcelona (397)
63	Sergio	Spain	418	34	Espanyol (110); Deportivo La Coruña (294); Levante (14)
63	Pablo Alfaro	Spain	418	7	Zaragoza (107); Barcelona (7); Racing Santander (130); Atlético Madrid (11); Mérida (34); Sevilla (129)
63	Roberto López Ufarte	Spain	418	112	Real Sociedad (363); Atlético Madrid (27); Real Betis (28)
66	Bittor Alkiza	Spain	417	19	Real Sociedad (130); Athletic Bilbao (287)
66	Julio Salinas	Spain	417	152	Athletic Bilbao (68); Atlético Madrid (75); Barcelona (146); Deportivo La Coruña (24); Sporting Gijón (54); Alavés (50)
66	Pirri	Spain	417	123	Real Madrid
69	Carmelo Cedrún	Spain	416	0	Athletic Bilbao (334); Espanyol (82)
70	José Francisco Molina	Spain	415	0	Albacete (23); Atlético Madrid (189); Deportivo La Coruña (169); Levante (34)
71	José Antonio Camacho	Spain	414	9	Real Madrid
71	Txetxu Rojo	Spain	414	48	Athletic Bilbao
71	Luis Arconada	Spain	414	0	Real Sociedad
74	Fernando Navarro	Spain	412	3	Barcelona (21); Albacete (7); Mallorca (106); Sevilla (203); Deportivo La Coruña (75)
74	**Jan Oblak**	Slovenia	412	0	**Atlético Madrid**
76	Joan Capdevila	Spain	410	36	Espanyol (60); Atlético Madrid (31); Deportivo La Coruña (179); Villarreal (140)
77	Alberto Lopo	Spain	409	19	Espanyol (178); Deportivo La Coruña (191); Getafe (40)
78	Caminero	Spain	408	57	Valladolid (259); Atlético Madrid (149)
79	Raúl Tamudo	Spain	407	146	Espanyol (340); Real Sociedad (31); Rayo Vallecano (36)
80	Andoni Iraola	Spain	406	33	Athletic Bilbao
81	Iñigo Martínez	Spain	405	22	Real Sociedad (205); Athletic Bilbao (152); Barcelona (48)
82	Míchel	Spain	404	97	Real Madrid
83	Juan Carlos Valerón	Spain	403	29	Mallorca (36); Atlético Madrid (65); Deportivo La Coruña (289); Las Palmas (13)
84	Marcos	Spain	402	25	Mallorca (171); Sevilla (209); Mérida (22)
84	**Isco**	Spain	402	71	Valencia (4); Málaga (69); Real Madrid (246); Sevilla (12); **Real Betis** (71)
86	César	Spain	401	0	Valladolid (206); Real Madrid (20); Zaragoza (110); Valencia (63); Villarreal (2)
86	Adelardo	Spain	401	73	Atlético Madrid
88	Luis Enrique	Spain	400	103	Sporting Gijón (36); Real Madrid (157); Barcelona (207)

== See also ==
- List of La Liga top scorers
