= Salva Iriarte =

Spanish footballer and manager

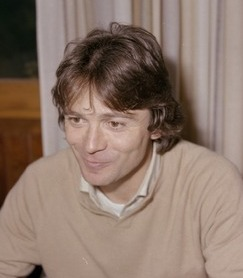
- Iriarte in 1981

Personal information
- Full name: Salvador Iriarte Montejo
- Date of birth: 2 April 1952 (age 74)
- Place of birth: Beasain, Spain
- Height: 1.70 m (5 ft 7 in)
- Position: Midfielder

Youth career
- Beasain
- 1968–1970: Real Sociedad

Senior career*
Years	Team	Apps	(Gls)
1970–1976	San Sebastián		
1976–1982	Real Sociedad	94	(3)

Managerial career
- 1985–1989: Real Sociedad B
- 1991–1994: Real Sociedad (assistant)
- 1994–1995: Real Sociedad
- 1997–2000: Real Sociedad B
- 2004–2007: Wales (assistant)
- * Club domestic league appearances and goals

Salvador "Salva" Iriarte Montejo (born 2 April 1952) is a Spanish retired footballer who played as a midfielder, and was later a manager.

== Career ==
Iriarte played in La Liga with Real Sociedad for several seasons after graduating from their youth system and spending a long period with the club's reserve team, but was unable to establish himself in the side. He was a barely-used squad member when La Real were league champions in 1981 and 1982, and at the end of the latter season he retired from playing to become a coach, aged 30.

Iriarte's managerial career was also closely associated with Real Sociedad, serving as assistant coach and then taking charge of the senior side for most of the 1994–95 season and the first part of 1995–96 (departing after a weak start in the league and a Copa del Rey elimination by lower-division CD Numancia) between two spells managing the B-team in the third tier. He also spent time as assistant manager of the Wales national team under John Toshack, having worked with him in the same role at Real Sociedad.

== Personal life ==
Iriarte's son Gaizka was also a footballer, who appeared for their hometown club SD Beasain, but never reached the professional level.

== Honours ==
- La Liga: 1980–81, 1981–82
