= Juan Antonio Larrañaga =

Spanish footballer

Personal information
- Full name: Juan Antonio Larrañaga Gurruchaga
- Date of birth: 3 July 1958 (age 68)
- Place of birth: Azpeitia, Spain
- Height: 1.77 m (5 ft 10 in)
- Positions: Defender; midfielder

Youth career
- Lagun Onak

Senior career*
Years	Team	Apps	(Gls)
1977–1980	San Sebastián	76	(16)
1980–1994	Real Sociedad	460	(15)
Total		536	(31)

International career
1986–1987	Spain U21	4	(0)
1987	Spain U23	2	(0)
1988	Spain	1	(0)
1993	Basque Country	1	(0)
- * Club domestic league appearances and goals

Juan Antonio Larrañaga Gurruchaga (alt.spelling Ion Andoni; born 3 July 1958) is a Spanish former professional footballer who played as a defender.

== Club career ==
Larrañaga was born in Azpeitia, Gipuzkoa, Basque Country. He started playing as a defensive midfielder, being signed by Real Sociedad in 1977 from local CD Lagun Onak. In January 1980 he made his first-team debut in the Copa del Rey, against Navarre neighbours Peña Sport FC.

Although he featured sparingly in the 1980–81 season, as Real won the first of their two consecutive La Liga titles, Larrañaga did take the field in the decisive draw at Sporting de Gijón in the last round, and featured in all the matches the following campaign whilst adding two goals. From 1986 to 1992, he only missed a total of two games; after manager John Toshack was appointed, he began playing as a sweeper. On 1 October 2021, his record of 202 consecutive Spanish top tier appearances was eclipsed by Athletic Bilbao forward Iñaki Williams in a match against Deportivo Alavés.

Larrañaga retired at 36 at the end of 1993–94, having made 460 top-flight appearances (589 overall, only behind teammate Alberto Górriz in Real Sociedad's record books). He was the only member of the league-winning sides to have played at both of the club's grounds: Atotxa and Anoeta.

== International career ==
Larrañaga won one cap for Spain, playing the entire 2–1 friendly defeat to Czechoslovakia on 24 February 1988, in Málaga. He also appeared four times for the under-21 team.

== Post-retirement ==
After retiring, Larrañaga took up coaching, but only in the lower leagues (for six years). He also appeared as a commentator for ETB 1, which lasted until the end of the 2005–06 season.

From 2006 to 2008, Larrañaga served as the youth coordinator of his only professional club, being fired at the end of the second division campaign.

== Honours ==
Real Sociedad

- La Liga: 1980–81, 1981–82
- Copa del Rey: 1986–87
- Supercopa de España: 1982

Individual

- Don Balón Award: 1987–88

== See also ==
- List of La Liga players (400+ appearances)
- List of one-club men in association football
