= Agustín Gajate =

Spanish footballer

Personal information
- Full name: Agustín Gajate Vidriales
- Date of birth: 23 March 1958 (age 68)
- Place of birth: San Sebastián, Spain
- Height: 1.80 m (5 ft 11 in)
- Position: Centre-back

Youth career
- Real Sociedad

Senior career*
| Years | Team | Apps | (Gls) |
| 1976–1977 | San Sebastián | 29 | (1) |
| 1977–1992 | Real Sociedad | 364 | (12) |
| Total | | 393 | (13) |

International career
| 1978 | Spain U21 | 3 | (0) |
| 1979–1980 | Spain U23 | 4 | (0) |
| 1979–1980 | Spain amateur | 6 | (0) |
- * Club domestic league appearances and goals

Agustín Gajate Vidriales (born 23 March 1958) is a Spanish former professional footballer who played as a central defender.

Not a skilled player (he was nicknamed Zapatones (Big shoes)), he excelled in man-marking, and played for Real Sociedad's first team for 15 years.

== Club career ==
Gajate was born in San Sebastián, Gipuzkoa. A Real Sociedad youth graduate, he played solely for the Basque club, making his first-team debut on 1 January 1978 away against Valencia CF (1–0 win, 90 minutes played); he appeared very rarely for the back-to-back La Liga champions – only four matches – as he his favoured position was occupied by another youth graduate, Alberto Górriz, but gradually carved a starting XI niche in place of veteran Inaxio Kortabarria, going on to form an effective centre-back partnership with Górriz.

After only missing a total of three games from 1986 to 1988 (adding five goals) as Real won the Copa del Rey in one season and finished league runners-up in the other, Gajate retired in June 1992, having appeared in 364 top-flight matches, 469 overall.

== International career ==
Gajate played three times for the Spain under-21 team, also appearing at the 1980 Summer Olympics as the nation exited in the group stage after three draws.

== Honours ==
Real Sociedad

- La Liga: 1980–81, 1981–82
- Copa del Rey: 1986–87
- Supercopa de España: 1982

== See also ==
- List of one-club men in association football
- List of Real Sociedad players
