= Julio Olaizola =

Spanish footballer

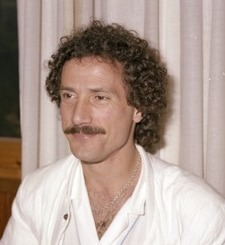
- Olaizola in 1981

Personal information
- Full name: Julio Antonio Olaizola Rodríguez
- Date of birth: 25 December 1950 (age 75)
- Place of birth: Lasarte-Oria, Spain
- Height: 1.74 m (5 ft 9 in)
- Position: Left-back

Youth career
- Real Sociedad

Senior career*
Years	Team	Apps	(Gls)
1969–1974	San Sebastián	149	(3)
1974–1985	Real Sociedad	250	(2)
Total		399	(5)
- * Club domestic league appearances and goals

Julio Antonio Olaizola Rodríguez (born 25 December 1950) is a Spanish former professional footballer who played as a left-back.

== Club career ==
Born in Lasarte-Oria, Gipuzkoa, Olaizola played solely for his local club Real Sociedad. He started out with their reserves in the Tercera División, where he remained five seasons.

Olaizola was promoted to the first team for 1974–75, but only appeared in his first game in La Liga in the following campaign, his debut occurring on 6 September 1975 as he featured the full 90 minutes in a 3–2 home win against Real Betis. He became an undisputed starter under manager José Antonio Irulegui and, as the side was already coached by Alberto Ormaetxea, contributed 58 appearances and one goal in back-to-back national championship conquests in the early 80s.

Olaizola retired in 1985, aged 34. He totalled 327 matches in all competitions.

== Personal life ==
Olaizola's younger brother, Javier (19 years his junior), was also a footballer and a defender. He represented mostly RCD Mallorca.

== Honours ==
- La Liga: 1980–81, 1981–82
- Supercopa de España: 1982

== See also ==
- List of one-club men
