= Antolín Ortega =

Spanish footballer

Personal information
- Full name: Antolín Ortega García
- Date of birth: 5 November 1951 (age 74)
- Place of birth: Madrid, Spain
- Height: 1.74 m (5 ft 9 in)
- Position: Midfielder

Youth career
- Real Madrid

Senior career*
| Years | Team | Apps | (Gls) |
| 1971–1975 | Castilla | | |
| 1971–1972 | → Osasuna (loan) | | |
| 1973–1975 | → Castellón (loan) | 40 | (1) |
| 1975–1978 | Cádiz | 86 | (6) |
| 1979–1987 | Betis | 250 | (5) |
| 1987–1988 | Recreativo | 21 | (0) |

International career
| 1970 | Spain U18 | 2 | (0) |
- * Club domestic league appearances and goals

Antolín Ortega García (born 5 November 1951, in Madrid) is a Spanish retired footballer who played as a midfielder.
