= José Diego (footballer) =

Spanish footballer

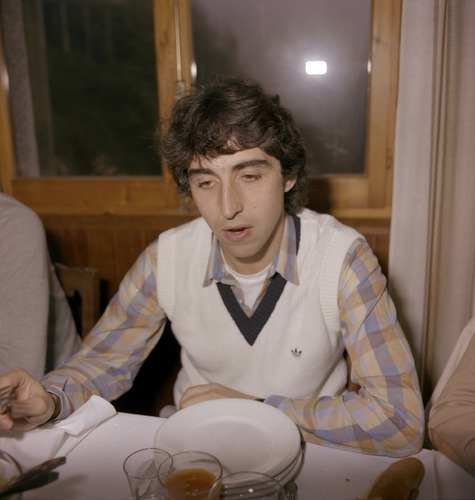
- José Diego Álvarez

Personal information
- Full name: José Diego Álvarez Álvarez
- Date of birth: 21 November 1954 (age 71)
- Place of birth: Monforte de Lemos, Spain
- Height: 1.79 m (5 ft 10 1/2 in)
- Position: Midfielder

Youth career
- Eibar

Senior career*
Years	Team	Apps	(Gls)
1971–1974	Eibar		
1974–1985	Real Sociedad	264	(16)

International career
1979	Spain U23	5	(0)
1980–1981	Spain B	3	(0)
1980	Spain	1	(0)
- * Club domestic league appearances and goals

José Diego Álvarez Álvarez (born 21 November 1954 in Monforte de Lemos, Lugo), known as José Diego, is a Spanish retired footballer who played as a defensive midfielder.

== Club career ==
Even though he was born in Galicia, José Diego and his family moved to the Basque Country as he was still an infant, settling in Eibar. He started playing football for local Sociedad Deportiva, going on to appear in three Tercera División seasons with the team.

In summer 1974, José Diego was signed by neighbouring Real Sociedad, making his La Liga debut on 7 September (two months before his 20th birthday) in a 3–2 home win against FC Barcelona and finishing his first year with eight games. From the following campaign onwards he became a very important unit for the Txuriurdin, going on to contribute with 96 matches and seven goals in three seasons combined as they won the national championship in 1981 and 1982, adding the second position in 1980.

After only two appearances in 1984–85, José Diego retired from football at the age of 30. He played in 349 official games for his main club, scoring 23 goals.

== International career ==
José Diego earned one cap for the Spain national team, playing the second half of a 0–2 friendly loss with England at the Camp Nou, on 26 March 1980. He was picked for the squad that participated in that year's UEFA European Championship.

== Honours ==
Real Sociedad

- La Liga: 1980–81, 1981–82
- Supercopa de España: 1982
