= José María Araquistain =

Spanish footballer and manager

Personal information
- Full name: José María Araquistain Oñaederra
- Date of birth: 17 August 1948 (age 78)
- Place of birth: Elgoibar, Spain
- Height: 1.82 m (5 ft 11 1/2 in)
- Position: Forward

Youth career
- Elgoibar

Senior career*
| Years | Team | Apps | (Gls) |
- Elgoibar
| 1968–1970 | Eibar | | |
| 1970–1977 | Real Sociedad | 132 | (37) |
| 1977–1980 | Sevilla | 11 | (0) |
| Total | | 143 | (37) |

International career
| 1975 | Spain amateur | 1 | (0) |

Managerial career
- 1992–1993: Elgoibar
- 1993–1995: Eibar
- 1995–1997: Beasain
- 1999: Beasain
- * Club domestic league appearances and goals

José María Araquistain Oñaederra (born 17 August 1948) is a Spanish retired footballer who played as a forward, and a current manager.

== Playing career ==
Born in Elgoibar, Gipuzkoa, Basque Country, Araquistain started his senior career with CD Elgoibar in the regional leagues. After attracting huge interest, he joined Tercera División side SD Eibar at the end of 1968.

After scoring 35 goals for the Armeros in the 1969–70 season, Araquistain moved to Real Sociedad in La Liga. His debut for the club occurred on 9 May 1970, in a match against Real Oviedo.

Araquistain was regularly used by the Txuri-urdin during his spell, his best input being in 1972–73 where he scored 11 goals in 31 appearances. He was later deemed surplus to requirements in 1977, after being rarely used during the campaign.

In June 1977 Araquistain signed a three-year deal with fellow league team Sevilla FC, for an estimated fee of 8 million pesetas. However, he struggled with injuries during his two-and-a-half-year spell at the club, and retired in February 1980 after rescinding his contract.

== Managerial career ==
After retiring Araquistain worked as a manager, being in charge of former clubs Eigoibar and Eibar, the latter in Segunda División. In November 1995 he was appointed at the helm of SD Beasain, being sacked in February 1997.

In March 1999 Araquistain returned to Beasain, remaining in charge until the end of the season.
