= Manuel Cervantes =

Spanish footballer

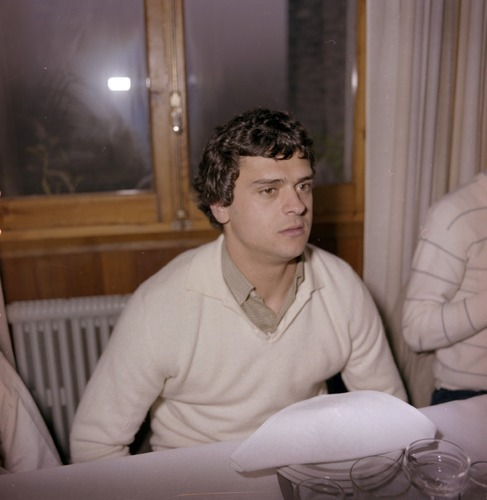

Personal information
- Full name: Manuel Cervantes García
- Date of birth: 6 April 1957 (age 69)
- Place of birth: Irun, Spain
- Position: Goalkeeper

Senior career*
Years	Team	Apps	(Gls)
1978–1981	Real Sociedad	0	(0)
1981–1985	Real Murcia	53	(0)
1985–1988	Real Betis	78	(0)
1988–1991	Salamanca	77	(0)
Total		208	(0)
- * Club domestic league appearances and goals

Manuel Cervantes García (born 6 April 1957) is a Spanish former professional footballer who played as a goalkeeper.

He is the father of professional tennis player Íñigo Cervantes Huegun.

== Career ==
Born in Irun, Cervantes played for Real Sociedad, Real Murcia, Real Betis and Salamanca.
