= Periko Alonso =

Spanish footballer

- Alonso in 1981

Personal information
- Full name: Miguel Ángel Alonso Oyarbide
- Date of birth: 1 February 1953 (age 73)
- Place of birth: Tolosa, Spain
- Height: 1.76 m (5 ft 9 in)
- Position: Midfielder

Youth career
- Tolosa

Senior career*
Years	Team	Apps	(Gls)
1974–1977	San Sebastián	86	(40)
1977–1982	Real Sociedad	152	(25)
1982–1985	Barcelona	54	(5)
1985–1988	Sabadell	103	(17)
Total		395	(87)

International career
1981	Spain B	2	(1)
1980–1982	Spain	20	(1)
1979	Basque Country	1	(0)

Managerial career
- 1988–1989: Tolosa
- 1989–1992: San Sebastián
- 1993–1995: Beasain
- 1995–1998: Eibar
- 1998–1999: Hércules
- 2000: Real Sociedad
- * Club domestic league appearances and goals

Miguel Ángel 'Periko' Alonso Oyarbide (born 1 February 1953) is a Spanish former football midfielder. He was also a manager.

He played mainly for Real Sociedad (five years) and Barcelona (three) in his professional career, achieving La Liga totals of 273 matches and 42 goals in ten seasons.

A Spanish international for two years, Alonso represented the country at the 1982 World Cup.

== Playing career ==
Born in Tolosa, Gipuzkoa, Alonso played professionally for Real Sociedad, Barcelona and Sabadell. With the first, he was instrumental in back-to-back La Liga conquests (averaging 32 games and five goals in those seasons and not starting only once), and won 19 of his 20 caps for Spain in the process; his debut came on 24 September 1980 in a friendly with Hungary (2–2), in Budapest.

In 1982–83, having retired from the national team following the unsuccessful home World Cup campaign, Alonso joined Barcelona, being used relatively little during most of his spell. He won the league in his final year, but only appeared twice, eventually retiring in 1988 with Barça neighbours Sabadell, helping the club achieve promotion from Segunda División in his first season and scoring 12 goals – a career-best – in his second, as the modest Catalans ranked 17th after the first 34 matches, but eventually managed to avoid a drop after finishing third in their relegation group in the second stage.

=== International goals ===
#	Date	Venue	Opponent	Score	Result	Competition
1.	18 November 1981	Stadion ŁKS, Łódź, Poland	Poland	2–3	2–3	Friendly

== Coaching career ==
Alonso started working as a manager immediately after retiring, mainly in the Basque Country. In 2000, after an unsuccessful spell at Hércules (second division, relegation), he had a chance to coach Real Sociedad but only lasted ten games, retiring from the sport subsequently.

== Personal life ==
Alonso's sons, Mikel and Xabi, were also footballers and midfielders. Both followed in their father's footsteps representing Real Sociedad, and the latter also played with great success for Liverpool, Real Madrid, Bayern Munich and the Spain national team.

== Honours ==
Real Sociedad

- La Liga: 1980–81, 1981–82

Barcelona

- La Liga: 1984–85
- Copa del Rey: 1982–83
- Supercopa de España: 1983
- Copa de la Liga: 1983
