= Jesús María Zamora =

Spanish retired footballer

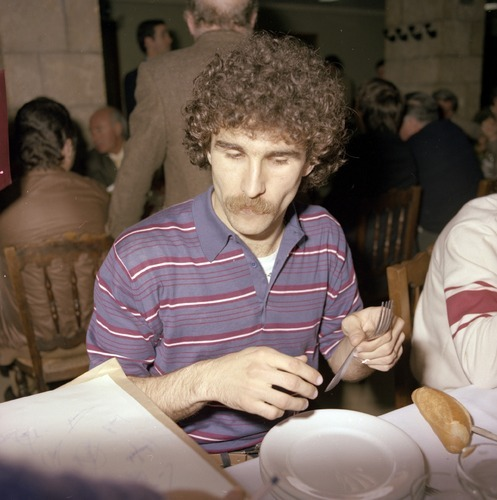
- Zamora in 1981

Personal information
- Full name: Jesús María Zamora Ansorena
- Date of birth: 1 January 1955 (age 71)
- Place of birth: Errenteria, Spain
- Height: 1.79 m (5 ft 10 in)
- Position: Midfielder

Youth career
- 1963–1972: Don Bosco
- 1972–1973: Real Sociedad
- 1972–1973: → Don Bosco (loan)

Senior career*
Years	Team	Apps	(Gls)
1973–1975	San Sebastián	52	(12)
1974–1989	Real Sociedad	455	(63)
Total		507	(75)

International career
1978–1982	Spain	30	(3)
- * Club domestic league appearances and goals

Jesús María Zamora Ansorena (born 1 January 1955) is a Spanish former professional footballer who played as a midfielder.

== Club career ==
Born in Errenteria, Gipuzkoa, Zamora spent his entire career with local club Real Sociedad. After a slow 1974–75 (nine games), he went on to make a further 446 La Liga appearances in the next 14 years, being an instrumental figure alongside the likes of namesake Jesús María Satrústegui.

Zamora's finest hour as a player undoubtedly came in the last game (and literally the last second) of the 1980–81 season, as he scored the tying goal at Sporting de Gijón, giving the Basques the needed point to clinch the league title at the expense of Real Madrid, whose players were already celebrating after a 3–1 away win against Real Valladolid, only to be told about Zamora's feat over a radio broadcast. He scored three in 31 matches the following campaign, as Sociedad renewed their domestic supremacy.

Having retired in 1989, Zamora worked with his only club in several capacities. From 2002 to 2004 he assisted Raynald Denoueix, and aided to a runner-up position in his second year. However, as another legendary teammate, José Mari Bakero, was relieved of his general manager duties by him, in late 2006, the season ended in relegation, the first in 40 years, and Zamora too resigned.

== International career ==
Zamora played 30 times for Spain and scored three goals, his debut coming in a friendly with Italy on 21 December 1978. He took part in the UEFA Euro 1980 and 1982 FIFA World Cup finals, retiring after the 0–0 draw against England on 5 July in the latter competition – this would also be longtime clubmate Satrústegui's last match.

On 25 March 1981, both Satrústegui and Zamora were on target as the national team won for the first time in history at Wembley Stadium, scoring on either side of Glenn Hoddle's 26th-minute equaliser.

== See also ==
- List of La Liga players (400+ appearances)
- List of one-club men in association football
- List of Real Sociedad players
