= Jesús María Satrústegui =

Spanish footballer

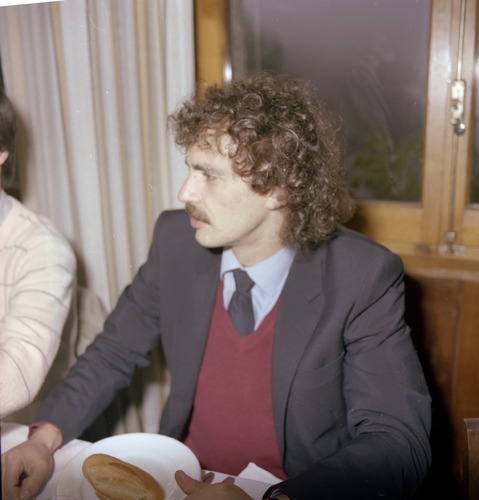
- Satrústegui in 1981

Personal information
- Full name: Jesús María Satrústegui Azpiroz
- Date of birth: 12 February 1954 (age 72)
- Place of birth: Pamplona, Spain
- Height: 1.83 m (6 ft 0 in)
- Position: Striker

Youth career
- CD Pamplona

Senior career*
Years	Team	Apps	(Gls)
1971–1973	San Sebastián	42	(13)
1973–1986	Real Sociedad	297	(133)
Total		339	(146)

International career
1971–1972	Spain U18	4	(1)
1976	Spain U21	1	(1)
1974–1975	Spain amateur	5	(2)
1975–1982	Spain	32	(8)
- * Club domestic league appearances and goals

Jesús María Satrústegui Azpiroz (born 12 February 1954) is a Spanish former professional footballer who played as a striker.

== Club career ==
Satrústegui was born in Pamplona, Navarre. However, he spent his entire professional career in the Basque Country, solely representing Real Sociedad. With the team, he scored 133 La Liga goals – a club record that stood for several decades – in 297 matches, contributing solidly to their league wins in 1981 and 1982, totalling 29 goals while playing alongside the likes of namesake Jesús María Zamora.

After a serious knee injury in a match against Real Zaragoza in November 1982 (meniscus, anterior cruciate ligament), Satrústegui never fully recovered and retired at the end of the 1985–86 season, aged 32.

== International career ==
Satrústegui earned 32 caps and scored eight goals for the Spain national team, and represented his country at UEFA Euro 1980 and the 1982 FIFA World Cup, retiring from international play immediately after the last second group-stage game, a 0–0 draw against England – this would also be Zamora's last appearance.

On 25 March 1981, both Satrústegui and Zamora were on target as their team ran victors for the first time ever at Wembley Stadium, countering Glenn Hoddle's equaliser.

== Career statistics ==
Scores and results list Spain's goal tally first, score column indicates score after each Satrústegui goal.

List of international goals scored by Jesús María Satrústegui
No.	Date	Venue	Opponent	Score	Result	Competition
1	9 February 1977	Lansdowne Road, Dublin, Republic of Ireland	Republic of Ireland	1–0	1–0	Friendly
2	24 September 1980	Népstadion, Budapest, Hungary	Hungary	2–2	2–2	Friendly
3	25 March 1981	Wembley, London, England	England	1–0	2–1	Friendly
4	28 June 1981	Olímpico, Caracas, Venezuela	Venezuela	2–0	2–0	Friendly
5	5 July 1981	Nacional, Santiago, Chile	Chile	1–1	1–1	Friendly
6	16 December 1981	Luis Casanova, Valencia, Spain	Belgium	1–0	2–0	Friendly
7	16 December 1981	Luis Casanova, Valencia, Spain	Belgium	2–0	2–0	Friendly
8	24 March 1982	Luis Casanova, Valencia, Spain	Wales	1–0	1–1	Friendly

== Honours ==
Real Sociedad

- La Liga: 1980–81, 1981–82
- Supercopa de España: 1982

== See also ==
- List of one-club men
