= Luis Arconada =

Spanish footballer

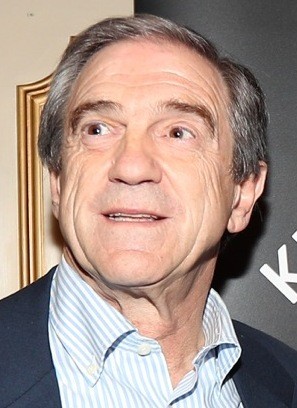
- Arconada in 2019

Personal information
- Full name: Luis Miguel Arconada Etxarri
- Date of birth: 26 June 1954 (age 72)
- Place of birth: San Sebastián, Spain
- Height: 1.78 m (5 ft 10 in)
- Position: Goalkeeper

Youth career
- Lengokoak
- Real Sociedad

Senior career*
Years	Team	Apps	(Gls)
1972–1974	San Sebastián	40	(0)
1974–1989	Real Sociedad	414	(0)
Total		454	(0)

International career
1972	Spain U18	4	(0)
1976	Spain amateur	2	(0)
1977–1985	Spain	68	(0)
1979	Basque Country	1	(0)
Medal record
Representing Spain
UEFA European Championship
Runner-up	1984 France
- * Club domestic league appearances and goals

Luis Miguel Arconada Etxarri (born 26 June 1954) is a Spanish former professional footballer who played as a goalkeeper.

He played only for Real Sociedad for nearly 20 years, and helped the club to four titles including two La Liga championships.

Arconada collected 68 caps for Spain over eight years, and was part of the squads at two World Cups and two European Championships.

== Club career ==
Arconada was born in San Sebastián, Gipuzkoa. Aged 16, he joined local giants Real Sociedad's youth ranks, going on to play his entire career there and being known as "El pulpo" (Octopus in English).

After two seasons backing up Urruti and the older Pedro Artola, Arconada became the club's undisputed starter by 1976. He was instrumental in consecutive La Liga titles, which led – after the second – to a semi-final run in the European Cup.

Arconada was seriously injured in 1985–86's league opener, which caused him to miss the remainder of the campaign and the 1986 FIFA World Cup. He still returned strong for three more seasons, helping Real Sociedad to two consecutive Copa del Rey finals before retiring at 35 with a total of 414 appearances (551 overall); after that, he remained apart from the football world.

== International career ==
On 27 March 1977, Arconada played his first game for Spain, a 1–1 friendly with Hungary in Alicante, replacing Real Madrid's Miguel Ángel for the second half. Having captained the nation on many occasions, he represented it at the 1978 and 1982 FIFA World Cups as well as at UEFA Euro 1980 and 1984.

In the 1982 World Cup, Arconada fumbled a cross from Billy Hamilton of Northern Ireland, dropping the ball for Gerry Armstrong to score the only goal in Valencia and help his team to win the group. The action was subsequently immortalised by Northern Irish fans, leading to the "Arconada...Armstrong!" fanzine, so-named due to John Motson's live commentary in the match.

At the 1984 European Championships, Arconada's blunder resulted in the opening goal for hosts France in a 2–0 final loss: he appeared to have smothered a free kick from Michel Platini under his chest in a diving save, but the ball slid off under his body and rolled slowly into the net; despite his reputation as a world-class goalkeeper, several years later he was still widely remembered for the error, known as "Arconada's goal" in Spain.

Arconada's last game was a 3–0 defeat in Wales for the 1986 World Cup qualifiers. A severe cruciate ligament injury while playing for Real ousted him from the final stages, being replaced by fellow Basque Andoni Zubizarreta.

During the ceremony following Spain's victory in Euro 2008, third choice Andrés Palop wore Arconada's original Euro 84 final shirt as he received the gold medal from Platini, now president of UEFA. He was also part of the squad at the 1976 Summer Olympics in Montreal, being eliminated in the first round.

== Style of play ==
Arconada was known for his leadership, bravery and consistency, and was regarded as one of the best Spanish goalkeepers of all time. His athleticism, speed, shot-stopping ability, reflexes, footwork and acrobatic style served as an inspiration to Iker Casillas.

In 2017, former goalkeeper Manuel Almunia also praised Arconada for his ability to produce saves with his feet.

== Personal life ==
Arconada's younger brother, Gonzalo, never played professional football, but had an extensive coaching career, mainly in the Segunda División B. For a few months in early 2006, he coached Real Sociedad's first team.

In 1992, Arconada became part of the board of directors at the Construcciones y Auxiliar de Ferrocarriles.

== Honours ==
Real Sociedad

- La Liga: 1980–81, 1981–82
- Copa del Rey: 1986–87; runner-up: 1987–88
- Supercopa de España: 1982

Spain

- UEFA European Championship runner-up: 1984

Individual

- Ricardo Zamora Trophy: 1979–80, 1980–81, 1981–82
- La Liga Team of The Year: 1979–80, 1981–82, 1987–88

== See also ==
- List of La Liga players (400+ appearances)
- List of one-club men in association football
- List of Real Sociedad players
