= Roberto López Ufarte =

Spanish former footballer (born 1958)

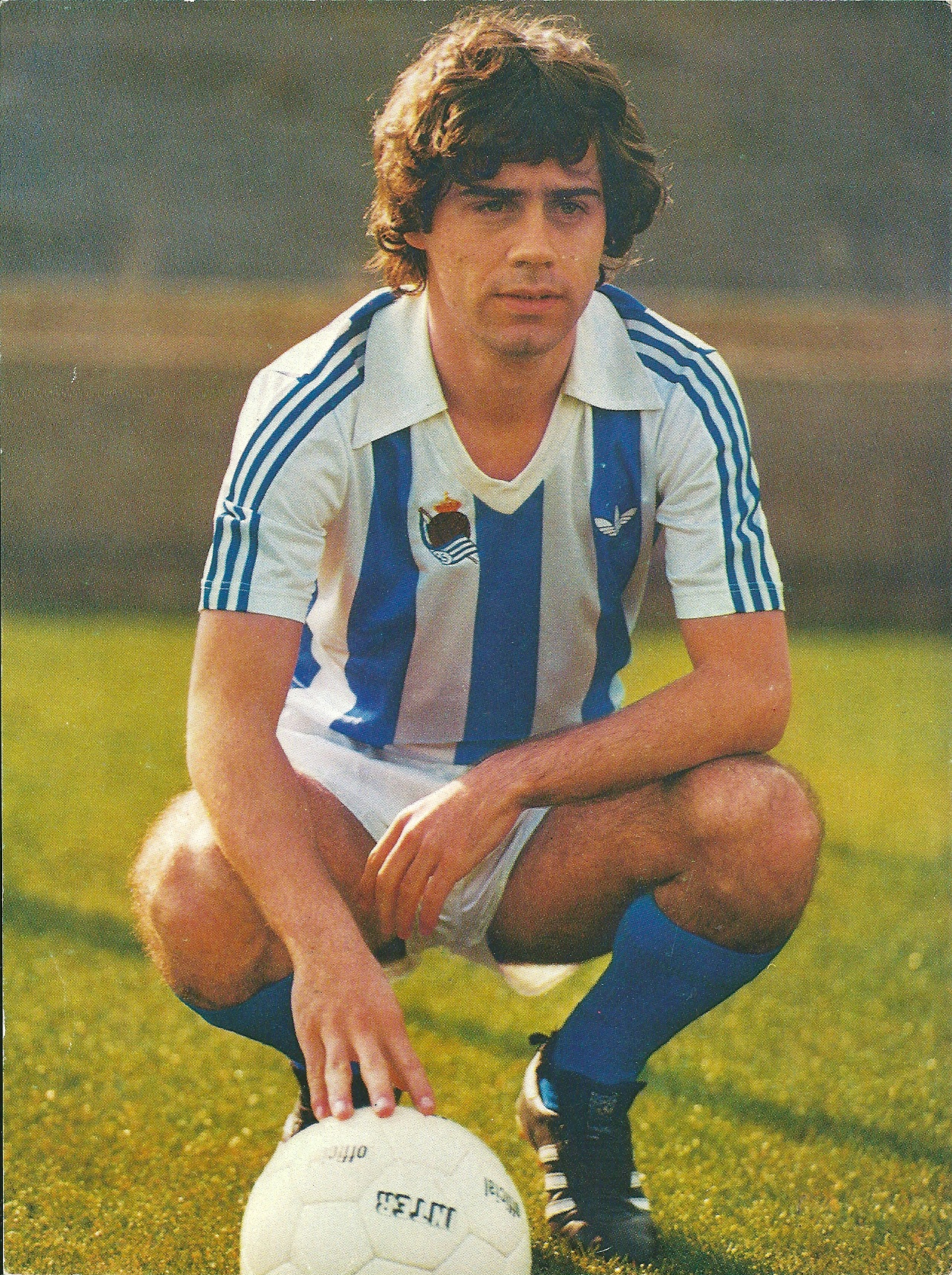
- López Ufarte as a Real Sociedad player

Personal information
- Full name: Roberto López Ufarte
- Date of birth: 19 April 1958 (age 68)
- Place of birth: Fez, Morocco
- Height: 1.70 m (5 ft 7 in)
- Position: Forward

Youth career
- Real Unión

Senior career*
Years	Team	Apps	(Gls)
1974–1975	Real Unión	41	(6)
1975–1987	Real Sociedad	363	(101)
1987–1988	Atlético Madrid	27	(8)
1988–1989	Betis	28	(3)
Total		459	(118)

International career
1975–1976	Spain U18	10	(4)
1976–1977	Spain U21	3	(0)
1977–1982	Spain	15	(5)

Managerial career
- 2000–2001: Real Sociedad B
- * Club domestic league appearances and goals

Roberto López Ufarte (born 19 April 1958) is a Spanish former professional footballer who played as a forward.

Nicknamed The little devil, most of his 15-year career was spent at Real Sociedad where he remained 12 seasons, winning four major titles including two La Liga championships. He also represented in the competition Atlético Madrid and Betis, amassing totals of 418 matches and 112 goals.

López Ufarte appeared for Spain at the 1982 World Cup.

== Early life ==
López Ufarte was born in Fez, Morocco. His parents, from Andalusia and Catalonia, moved abroad in search of work, and arrived in Morocco (then part of Spain) in 1944 during the Second World War, returning to Irun in the Basque Country two decades later.

== Club career ==
López Ufarte signed for Real Sociedad after starting out at neighbouring Real Unión, making his La Liga debut in the 1975–76 season and playing his first game in the competition on 30 November 1975 in a 2–0 Basque derby away loss against Athletic Bilbao, aged only 17. From then on he became an essential first-team member, scoring 16 goals in 63 matches in the side's back-to-back league titles.

López Ufarte left the Txuriurdin in 1987, following another solid season (33 games and ten goals in the league, and victory in the Copa del Rey). He scored 129 goals in 474 official appearances during his spell.

After one season with Atlético Madrid where he achieved a third place, López Ufarte closed his career at Real Betis at the age of 31, having struggled with knee injuries and seen his team relegated to Segunda División. He then acted as assistant manager to several coaches at his first professional club, subsequently returning to Real Unión as director of football.

== International career ==
López Ufarte won 15 caps for the Spain national team in five years. His debut came on 21 September 1977, scoring in a 2–1 friendly win in Switzerland.

López Ufarte appeared for the nation at the 1982 FIFA World Cup which was held on home ground, scoring in the 1–1 draw against Honduras and playing his last match in a 2–1 second group-stage loss to West Germany.

=== International goals ===
#	Date	Venue	Opponent	Score	Result	Competition
1.	21 September 1977	Wankdorf, Bern, Switzerland	Switzerland	1–2	1–2	Friendly
2.	14 October 1981	Luis Casanova, Valencia, Spain	Luxembourg	1–0	3–0	Friendly
3.	14 October 1981	Luis Casanova, Valencia, Spain	Luxembourg	3–0	3–0	Friendly
4.	18 November 1981	Stadion ŁKS, Łódź, Poland	Poland	0–1	2–3	Friendly
5.	16 June 1982	Luis Casanova, Valencia, Spain	Honduras	1–1	1–1	1982 FIFA World Cup

== Honours ==
Real Sociedad

- La Liga: 1980–81, 1981–82
- Copa del Rey: 1986–87
- Supercopa de España: 1983

== See also ==
- List of La Liga players (400+ appearances)
- List of Real Sociedad players
- List of Spain international footballers born outside Spain
