= Alberto Ormaetxea =

Spanish footballer and coach

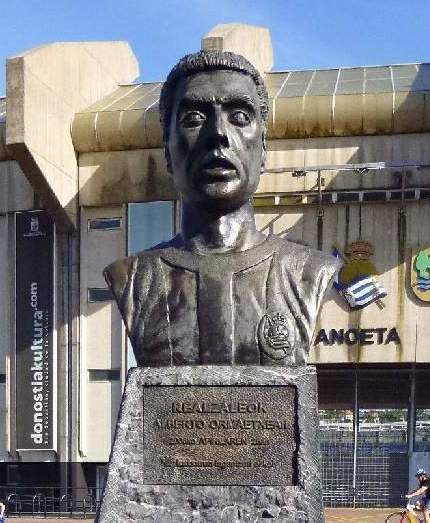
- Bust of Ormaetxea at Anoeta Stadium

Personal information
- Full name: Alberto Ormaetxea Ibarlucea
- Date of birth: 7 April 1939
- Place of birth: Eibar, Spain
- Date of death: 28 October 2005 (aged 66)
- Place of death: San Sebastián, Spain
- Height: 1.77 m (5 ft 10 in)
- Position: Full-back

Youth career
- Urko

Senior career*
Years	Team	Apps	(Gls)
1958–1959	Eibar	3	(0)
1959–1962	San Sebastián	29	(0)
1959–1960	→ Eibar (loan)		
1962–1974	Real Sociedad	239	(2)

Managerial career
- 1974–1978: Real Sociedad (assistant)
- 1978–1985: Real Sociedad
- 1986: Hércules
- * Club domestic league appearances and goals

Alberto Ormaetxea Ibarlucea (7 April 1939 – 28 October 2005) was a Spanish football defender (right and left-back) and coach.

His career was closely associated to Real Sociedad, as both a player and a manager. He was in charge of the team when they won their only two La Liga titles in the 80s.

== Playing career ==
Born in Eibar, Gipuzkoa, Ormaetxea started his senior career with local SD Eibar, with whom he was relegated from the Segunda División in 1958. The following year, he was purchased by Real Sociedad, who immediately loaned him to his previous club.

Ormaetxea started playing as a right-back, but eventually switched flanks. In the summer of 1962, after two seasons with the reserves, he was promoted to the first team that had just been relegated from La Liga, helping them return to the competition at the end of the 1966–67 campaign.

Ormaetxea's best year in the top tier was 1969–70, when he started in all his 28 league appearances and scored twice to help the Txuriurdin finish in seventh position. He retired in 1974 at the age of 35 after several injury problems, having appeared in 280 games in all competitions.

== Coaching career ==
Immediately after retiring, Ormaetxea joined Real Sociedad's coaching staff as an assistant manager. In 1978, he replaced José Antonio Irulegui at the helm of the main squad, taking them to national championship conquests in 1981 and 1982 as well as the semi-finals of the Copa del Rey in 1982 and 1983. Additionally, in 1979–80, the club trailed Real Madrid by only one point and, taking the previous season into account, established a record of 38 matches without defeat that stood for several decades.

Ormaetxea left Hércules CF in September 1986 after only one month in charge, and retired from professional football, going on to work with Real's veterans and write for El Diario Vasco. In 2005, he supported Miguel Ángel Fuentes as the latter ran for president of Sociedad.

== Death ==
Ormaetxea died on 28 October 2005 in San Sebastián, after a long battle with illness. He was 66 years old.

== Honours ==
=== Player ===
Real Sociedad

- Segunda División: 1966–67

=== Manager ===
Real Sociedad

- La Liga: 1980–81, 1981–82
- Supercopa de España: 1982
