= Alberto Górriz =

Spanish footballer

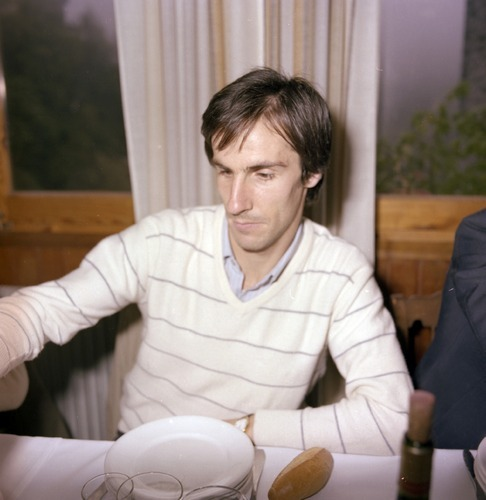
- Górriz in 1981

Personal information
- Full name: Alberto Górriz Echarte
- Date of birth: 16 February 1958 (age 68)
- Place of birth: Irun, Spain
- Height: 1.82 m (6 ft 0 in)
- Position: Centre-back

Youth career
- San Marcial
- Real Sociedad

Senior career*
Years	Team	Apps	(Gls)
1977–1979	San Sebastián	43	(2)
1979–1993	Real Sociedad	461	(14)
Total		504	(16)

International career
1988–1990	Spain	12	(1)
1990	Basque Country	1	(0)
- * Club domestic league appearances and goals

Alberto Górriz Echarte (born 16 February 1958) is a Spanish former professional footballer who played as a central defender.

His main asset was his heading ability, and he often scored from set pieces. He spent his entire career with Real Sociedad, appearing in nearly 600 official matches and winning four major titles.

Górriz represented Spain at the 1990 World Cup.

== Club career ==
A Real Sociedad youth graduate, Górriz was born in Irun, Gipuzkoa, and played solely for the Basques, making his first-team debut on 8 April 1979 in a 4–0 away win against Rayo Vallecano. From his third season – where Real won the La Liga title – onwards he was a defensive stalwart until the 1991–92 campaign, with 31 games as his minimum output, often being partnered by Agustín Gajate who also only appeared for one professional club.

Górriz retired in June 1993 having appeared in 461 top-flight matches (599 overall, the club record), his final year also being the old Atotxa Stadium's last.

== International career ==
Górriz earned 12 caps for the Spain national team in one and a half years. He made his debut on 16 November 1988 at already 30, in a 1990 FIFA World Cup qualifier against the Republic of Ireland, a 2–0 victory in Seville.

Being subsequently picked for the finals in Italy, Górriz scored his only goal for his country in the 2–1 group stage win over Belgium, heading home a free kick from Real Madrid's Míchel.

== Honours ==
Real Sociedad

- La Liga: 1980–81, 1981–82
- Copa del Rey: 1986–87
- Supercopa de España: 1982

== See also ==
- List of La Liga players (400+ appearances)
- List of one-club men in association football
