= Pedro Uralde =

Spanish footballer

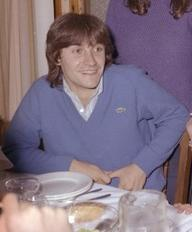
- Uralde in 1981

Personal information
- Full name: Pedro Uralde Hernáez
- Date of birth: 2 March 1958 (age 68)
- Place of birth: Vitoria, Spain
- Height: 1.75 m (5 ft 9 in)
- Position: Striker

Youth career
- Ariznabarra
- Aurrerá
- Real Sociedad

Senior career*
Years	Team	Apps	(Gls)
1976–1979	San Sebastián	88	(28)
1978–1986	Real Sociedad	181	(61)
1986–1987	Atlético Madrid	36	(8)
1987–1990	Athletic Bilbao	96	(34)
1990–1992	Deportivo La Coruña	56	(23)
Total		457	(154)

International career
1982–1986	Spain	3	(0)
- * Club domestic league appearances and goals

Pedro Uralde Hernáez (born 2 March 1958) is a Spanish former professional footballer who played as a striker.

== Club career ==
Born in Vitoria-Gasteiz, Álava, Uralde started his career with local giants Real Sociedad, already being a first-team regular by the time the Basques won two La Liga titles in a row (57 matches and 21 goals from 1980 to 1982, including four in the last five fixtures of the latter season). He made his debut in the competition on 3 February 1980 by coming on as a late substitute in a 4–0 home victory against Athletic Bilbao, and played there until the end of the 1985–86 campaign.

Uralde also claimed the 1982 Supercopa de España with Real. Following a 1–0 loss to Real Madrid at the Santiago Bernabéu Stadium, he scored twice in the second leg, a 4–0 home win in extra time in the first edition of the competition.

Afterwards, Uralde spent one year with Atlético Madrid – 1986–87 – teaming up with another Basque forward, Julio Salinas, for 23 goals, but the capital club could only finished seventh. He then signed for neighbours Athletic Bilbao, going on to appear in 110 competitive games during his spell.

In his final two years, Uralde represented Deportivo de La Coruña, later Super Depor, netting 23 times in the league prior to the arrival of Bebeto and retiring at 34, with 111 top-flight goals to his credit from 338 appearances.

== International career ==
Uralde earned three caps for Spain, his debut coming on 28 April 1982 in a friendly with Switzerland (90 minutes played, in Valencia). Subsequently, he was called for that year's FIFA World Cup, where he featured 23 minutes in the 0–0 second group-stage draw against England in Madrid.

== Honours ==
Real Sociedad

- La Liga: 1980–81, 1981–82
- Supercopa de España: 1982
