= 1981–82 La Liga =

Spanish football league season

La Liga
- Dates: 19 September 1981 – 25 April 1982
- Champions: Real Sociedad; 2nd title
- Relegated: Cádiz; Hércules; Castellón
- European Cup: Real Sociedad
- Cup Winners' Cup: Real Madrid; Barcelona (as title holders)
- UEFA Cup: Athletic Bilbao; Valencia; Real Betis; Sevilla
- Matches: 306
- Goals: 853 (2.79 per match)
- Top goalscorer: Quini (27 goals)

The 1981–82 La Liga season was the 51st since its establishment. It began on 19 September 1981, and concluded on 25 April 1982.

== Teams ==
Location of teams in La Liga 1981–82
Canary Islands

Team	Home city	Stadium
Athletic Bilbao	Bilbao	San Mamés
Atlético Madrid	Madrid	Vicente Calderón
Barcelona	Barcelona	Nou Camp
Cádiz	Cádiz	Ramón de Carranza
Castellón	Castellón de la Plana	Castalia
Español	Barcelona	Sarriá
Hércules	Alicante	José Rico Pérez
Las Palmas	Las Palmas	Insular
Osasuna	Pamplona	El Sadar
Racing Santander	Santander	El Sardinero
Real Betis	Seville	Benito Villamarín
Real Madrid	Madrid	Santiago Bernabéu
Real Sociedad	San Sebastián	Atocha
Sevilla	Seville	Ramón Sánchez Pizjuán
Sporting Gijón	Gijón	El Molinón
Valencia	Valencia	Luis Casanova
Valladolid	Valladolid	José Zorrilla
Zaragoza	Zaragoza	La Romareda

== League table ==
Pos	Team	Pld	W	D	L	GF	GA	GD	Pts	Qualification or relegation
1	Real Sociedad (C)	34	20	7	7	58	33	+25	47	Qualification for the European Cup first round
2	Barcelona	34	19	7	8	75	40	+35	45	Qualification for the Cup Winners' Cup first round (Note: Real Madrid qualified for the European Cup Winners' Cup by winning the Copa del Rey, while Barcelona for the tournament as title holders.)
3	Real Madrid	34	18	8	8	57	34	+23	44	Qualification for the Cup Winners' Cup first round
4	Athletic Bilbao	34	18	4	12	63	41	+22	40	Qualification for the UEFA Cup first round
5	Valencia	34	17	5	12	54	46	+8	39	Qualification for the UEFA Cup first round
6	Real Betis	34	15	6	13	53	44	+9	36	Qualification for the UEFA Cup first round
7	Sevilla	34	15	5	14	52	39	+13	35	Qualification for the UEFA Cup first round
8	Atlético Madrid	34	15	4	15	38	37	+1	34	
9	Valladolid	34	13	8	13	40	53	−13	34	
10	Osasuna	34	14	6	14	45	45	0	34	
11	Zaragoza	34	13	8	13	45	56	−11	34	
12	Racing Santander	34	12	8	14	41	52	−11	32	
13	Español	34	13	6	15	48	55	−7	32	
14	Sporting Gijón	34	10	9	15	38	44	−6	29	
15	Las Palmas	34	11	7	16	41	53	−12	29	
16	Cádiz (R)	34	13	3	18	31	47	−16	29	Relegation to the Segunda División
17	Hércules (R)	34	11	5	18	41	52	−11	27	Relegation to the Segunda División
18	Castellón (R)	34	3	6	25	33	82	−49	12	Relegation to the Segunda División

Source: BDFútbol
Rules for classification: 1) Points; 2) Head-to-head results; 3) Goal difference; 4) Number of goals scored
(C) Champions; (R) Relegated

== Results table ==
Home \ Away	ATH	ATM	BAR	BET	CÁD	CAS	ESP	HÉR	LPA	OSA	RAC	RMA	RSO	SEV	SPG	VAL	VLD	ZAR
Athletic Bilbao		2–0	1–1	5–1	3–0	2–1	3–1	3–1	3–1	5–1	4–1	1–2	1–1	2–0	2–1	1–0	4–0	4–1
Atlético Madrid	2–0		0–1	1–0	1–0	3–0	1–0	1–0	3–1	2–1	0–0	2–3	2–0	1–2	1–1	2–1	2–0	1–0
FC Barcelona	2–2	2–0		2–2	4–0	4–3	1–3	5–0	4–0	2–0	5–1	3–1	2–0	2–0	1–0	5–1	3–1	2–1
Betis	2–1	3–1	2–0		2–0	3–1	2–0	1–2	4–1	2–0	1–1	0–0	0–1	2–0	2–0	2–3	4–0	2–0
Cádiz CF	3–0	1–0	1–0	0–2		5–1	0–0	3–2	0–2	1–0	1–0	1–0	2–1	2–0	3–1	0–0	0–0	1–0
CD Castellón	1–2	3–0	1–6	0–0	0–1		1–4	1–2	1–1	1–1	0–0	1–2	1–3	0–3	0–2	1–4	1–1	2–1
RCD Español	1–0	2–2	0–4	2–4	1–0	3–2		0–1	2–1	0–1	1–1	1–0	2–1	2–0	5–1	3–2	3–1	0–1
Hércules CF	3–1	0–1	2–2	3–1	2–1	2–2	2–0		3–0	1–2	3–4	0–1	2–0	0–1	1–0	2–2	0–2	0–1
UD Las Palmas	2–1	1–2	2–1	3–1	2–0	1–3	2–0	2–0		0–0	1–1	1–0	0–0	3–1	1–1	3–0	1–1	2–4
Osasuna	0–2	0–1	3–2	0–1	6–1	4–1	3–0	3–1	1–3		2–1	3–2	0–0	1–0	1–1	2–1	1–1	1–0
Racing de Santander	1–3	1–0	0–1	2–1	2–1	4–1	2–1	2–0	3–1	0–3		3–2	2–3	3–0	1–0	1–1	3–0	0–1
Real Madrid	1–1	2–1	3–1	4–1	2–0	4–0	1–1	2–1	2–1	1–0	4–0		1–1	2–1	1–1	3–0	3–1	3–0
Real Sociedad	2–1	1–0	1–1	1–0	3–0	3–1	2–1	2–1	2–0	1–0	1–1	3–1		1–0	3–0	4–1	4–0	3–0
Sevilla FC	1–0	1–0	2–1	1–1	3–1	4–0	4–1	0–1	0–0	2–3	4–0	0–0	2–2		0–0	2–0	4–2	5–0
Sporting de Gijón	1–3	3–2	0–0	1–0	2–1	1–0	4–1	1–1	4–0	2–0	2–0	0–1	2–3	0–2		1–0	2–2	1–2
Valencia CF	4–0	1–0	3–0	2–1	1–0	1–0	1–1	2–0	3–2	4–1	3–0	2–1	1–2	3–2	1–0		3–0	2–1
Valladolid	1–0	2–1	2–3	3–0	2–0	2–0	2–4	1–0	1–0	2–0	0–0	0–0	2–1	2–1	2–1	1–1		2–1
Zaragoza	1–0	2–2	2–2	3–3	2–1	3–2	2–2	2–2	1–0	1–1	1–0	2–2	3–2	1–4	1–1	2–0	2–1	

Legend: Blue = home team win; Yellow = draw; Red = away team win.

== Top goalscorers ==
Rank	Player	Club	Goals
1	(Spain) Quini	Barcelona	27
2	(Spain) Pichi Alonso	Zaragoza	16
3	(Paraguay) Carlos Diarte	Real Betis	14
3	(Spain) Pedro Uralde	Real Sociedad	14
5	(Spain) Raúl Amarilla	Zaragoza	13
5	(Denmark) Frank Arnesen	Valencia	13
5	(Spain) Santi Lorente	Sevilla	13
5	(Spain) Manuel Sarabia	Athletic Bilbao	13
5	(Spain) Jesús María Satrústegui	Real Sociedad	13
5	(Spain) Segundo	Hércules	13
