= List of Basque footballers =

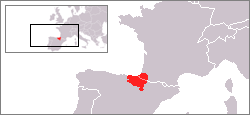
Location of the 'Greater Basque Country' which has produced many players for the Spain national team, and others

The list of Basque footballers features male association football players from the 'Greater Basque Country', a territory with a population of around 3 million (comprising the Basque autonomous Community (País Vasco or Euskadi) and Navarre which are two of Spain's seventeen autonomous communities, plus the Northern Basque Country, an agglomeration community in France) who have reached international status with the national teams as specified, the vast majority representing Spain.

The region has a representative squad – the Basque Country national football team – but they are not recognised by FIFA, were inactive for long periods and only play friendly matches against FIFA teams or against other sides with similar status such as Catalonia.

== Basque Country national team players (since 1990) ==
Listed below are the players who have featured for the Basque Country international team dating from 1990 when regular fixtures against FIFA national teams were arranged. As of December 2025, 31 matches have been played in this era (including four against Catalonia and one against Corsica who have the same unofficial status as the Basques and select their squads on the same basis), with 224 players involved.

	Key
*	Still active for the national team (Note: Players who are still active for the national team are players who have not retired from football (although they may have retired from their FIFA international team) and are, subsequently, eligible to be called up.)
=	Player is tied for the number of caps
GK	Goalkeeper
DF	Defender
MF	Midfielder
FW	Forward

Basque Country national team players since 1990
#	Name	Position	First cap (Note: Basque Country score given first in all cases.)	Last cap	Caps	Goals
1	Xabi Prieto	MF	2004 (Note: 2–0 vs Honduras, 2004)	2016 (Note: 3–1 vs Tunisia, 2016)	14	0
2	Aritz Aduriz	FW	2006 (Note: 2–2 vs Catalonia, 2006)	2019 (Note: 0–0 vs Panama, 2019)	13	12
3	Igor Gabilondo	MF	2002 (Note: 1–1 vs North Macedonia, 2002)	2011 (Note: 0–2 vs Tunisia, 2011)	12	1
=	Gorka Iraizoz	GK	2004	2016	12	0
5	Julen Guerrero	MF	1993 (Note: 3–1 vs Bolivia, 1993)	2006 (Note: 0–1 vs Wales, 2006)	11	6
=	Joseba Etxeberria	FW	1998 (Note: 5–1 vs Uruguay, 1998)	2007 (Note: 1–1 vs Catalonia, 2007)	11	2
=	Asier Riesgo	GK	2003 (Note: 2–1 vs Uruguay, 2003)	2018 (Note: 4–2 vs Venezuela, 2018)	11	0
8	Bittor Alkiza	MF	1993	2002	9	0
=	Aitor López Rekarte	DF	2000 (Note: 3–2 vs Morocco, 2000)	2007	9	0
=	Mikel Aranburu	MF	2002	2011	9	0
=	Andoni Iraola	DF	2003	2013 (Note: 6–0 vs Peru, 2013)	9	0
12	Agustín Aranzábal	DF	1995 (Note: 1–1 vs Paraguay, 1995)	2003	8	0
=	Ismael Urzaiz	FW	1997 (Note: 3–1 vs FR Yugoslavia, 1997)	2006 (Note: 4–0 vs Serbia, 2006)	8	3
=	Mikel Labaka	DF	2005 (Note: 0–1 vs Cameroon, 2005)	2012 (Note: 6–1 vs Bolivia, 2012)	8	1
=	Iñigo Martínez*	DF	2011	2019	8	0
16	José Antonio Pikabea	DF	1993	1999 (Note: 5–1 vs Nigeria, 1999)	7	0
=	Javi de Pedro	MF	1995	2001 (Note: 3–2 vs Ghana, 2001)	7	2
=	Mikel González	DF	2007 (Note: 4–3 vs Venezuela, 2007)	2016	7	0
=	Markel Susaeta	MF	2010 (Note: 3–1 vs Venezuela, 2010)	2016	7	1
=	Gaizka Toquero	FW	2010	2016	7	2
=	Mikel San José	MF	2011 (Note: 2–1 vs Estonia, 2011)	2019	7	0
=	Mikel Balenziaga	DF	2012	2020 (Note: 2–1 vs Costa Rica, 2020)	7	0
23	Aitor Karanka	DF	1994 (Note: 1–0 vs Russia, 1994)	2004	6	0
=	Gaizka Mendieta	MF	1998	2007	6	1
=	Carlos Gurpegui	MF	2003	2016 (Note: 1–1 vs Corsica, 2016)	6	1
=	Ion Ansotegi	DF	2010	2016	6	0
=	Ander Iturraspe	MF	2011	2016	6	0
=	Yuri Berchiche*	DF	2014 (Note: 1–1 vs Catalonia, 2014)	2020	6	0
29	Rafael Alkorta	DF	1990 (Note: 2–2 vs Romania, 1990)	1999	5	0
=	Josu Urrutia	MF	1990	2001	5	2
=	Kuko Ziganda	FW	1994	1998	5	4
=	Xabier Eskurza	MF	1994	1999	5	0
=	Bolo	FW	1996 (Note: 3–0 vs Estonia, 1996)	2003	5	4
=	Iñigo Idiakez	MF	1996	2000	5	2
=	Antonio Karmona	DF	1999	2003	5	0
=	Xabi Alonso	MF	2001	2012	5	0
=	Fran Yeste	MF	2003	2007	5	3
=	Gaizka Garitano	MF	2003	2007	5	0
=	Mikel Alonso	MF	2004	2007	5	0
=	Fernando Llorente	FW	2005	2007	5	1
=	Javier Garrido	DF	2006	2016	5	0
=	David Zurutuza	MF	2010	2018	5	0
=	Imanol Agirretxe	FW	2010	2015 (Note: 1–0 vs Catalonia, 2015)	5	3
=	Oier	DF	2010	2020	5	0
=	Markel Bergara	MF	2011	2016	5	1
=	Ander Capa*	DF	2014	2020	5	0
=	Roberto Torres*	MF	2013	2024 (Note: 1–1 vs Uruguay, 2024)	5	1
=	Dani García*	MF	2014	2024	5	0
49	Patxi Ferreira	DF	1990	1997	4	0
=	Jon Andoni Goikoetxea	MF	1990	1996	4	1
=	Andoni Imaz	MF	1993	1997	4	0
=	Andoni Zubizarreta	GK	1993	1997	4	0
=	Iñigo Larrainzar	DF	1995	2000	4	0
=	Alberto	GK	1998	2001	4	0
=	Imanol Etxeberria	GK	1998	2003	4	0
=	Óscar de Paula	FW	1998	2001	4	5
=	César Cruchaga	DF	2001	2006	4	0
=	Asier Del Horno	DF	2003	2007	4	0
=	Fernando Amorebieta	DF	2007	2011	4	0
=	Iker Muniain	MF	2010	2020	4	2
=	Beñat	MF	2011	2014	4	0
=	Jon Aurtenetxe*	DF	2011	2015	4	0
=	Mikel Rico	MF	2011	2016	4	0
=	Ibai	FW	2012	2018	4	2
=	Asier Illarramendi*	MF	2013	2018	4	1
=	Javier Eraso	MF	2015	2019	4	0
=	Manu García	MF	2016	2020	4	0
70	Ander Garitano	MF	1993	1996	3	0
=	Julen Lopetegui	GK	1993	2000	3	0
=	Mikel Lasa	DF	1993	1997	3	0
=	Andoni Cedrún	GK	1994	1997	3	0
=	Imanol Alguacil	DF	1994	1997	3	0
=	Javier Olaizola	DF	1998	2003	3	0
=	Patxi Puñal	MF	2002	2007	3	0
=	Tiko	MF	2003	2006	3	0
=	Luis Prieto	DF	2003	2006	3	0
=	Joseba Llorente	FW	2004	2010	3	0
=	Gari Uranga	FW	2005	2006	3	1
=	Pablo Orbaiz	MF	2005	2007	3	0
=	Pantxi Sirieix	MF	2006	2011	3	0
=	Josu Sarriegi	DF	2006	2007	3	1
=	Iñaki Lafuente	GK	2006	2007	3	0
=	Iñaki Muñoz	MF	2006	2007	3	0
=	Carlos Martínez	DF	2012	2015	3	0
=	Eneko Bóveda	DF	2014	2016	3	0
=	Xabi Etxeita	DF	2014	2016	3	0
=	Aritz Elustondo*	DF	2018	2024	3	1
=	Asier Villalibre*	FW	2019	2024	3	0
=	Aitor Fernández*	GK	2019	2025 (Note: 1–1 vs Mandatory Palestine, 2025)	3	0
=	Aihen Muñoz*	DF	2019	2025	3	0
=	Ander Guevara*	MF	2020	2025	3	0
96	Genar Andrinúa	DF	1990	1996	2	1
=	José Luis Ribera	DF	1993	1994	2	0
=	Luis López Rekarte	DF	1993	1994	2	0
=	Txiki Begiristain	FW	1993	1994	2	0
=	Julio Salinas	FW	1993	1994	2	2
=	Óscar Vales	DF	1995	1997	2	0
=	Roberto Ríos	DF	1996	1997	2	0
=	Iván Campo	MF	2000	2006	2	0
=	Ibon Begoña	DF	2001	2002	2	0
=	Ricardo Sanzol	GK	2002	2004	2	0
=	Edu Alonso	MF	2002	2006	2	0
=	Unai Expósito	DF	2004	2005	2	0
=	José Barkero	MF	2005	2010	2	0
=	Aitor Ocio	DF	2005	2006	2	0
=	Javi Martínez*	MF	2006	2010	2	0
=	Aitor	MF	2006	2007	2	0
=	Borja Ekiza	DF	2011	2013	2	0
=	Gorka Elustondo	MF	2011	2016	2	0
=	Kike Sola	FW	2011	2012	2	0
=	Eñaut Zubikarai	GK	2012	2013	2	0
=	Joseba Zaldúa*	DF	2016	2016	2	0
=	Sabin*	FW	2016	2016	2	0
=	Anaitz Arbilla*	DF	2018	2020	2	1
=	Jon Bautista*	FW	2018	2020	2	1
=	Iñaki Williams*	FW	2018	2020	2	0
=	Iago Herrerín*	GK	2019	2020	2	0
=	Mikel Vesga*	MF	2018	2024	2	0
=	Martín Aguirregabiria*	DF	2018	2024	2	0
=	Oier Zarraga*	MF	2024	2025	2	0
128	Vicente Biurrun	GK	1990		1	0
=	Eugenio Bustingorri	DF	1990		1	0
=	Alberto Górriz	DF	1990		1	0
=	Pedro Uralde	FW	1990		1	0
=	David Villabona	MF	1990		1	0
=	Andoni Lakabeg	DF	1990		1	0
=	Andoni Goikoetxea	DF	1990		1	0
=	Eduardo Estíbariz	DF	1990		1	0
=	Estanislao Argote	MF	1990		1	0
=	Patxi Iru (es)	GK	1990		1	0
=	Luciano Iturrino (es)	MF	1990		1	0
=	Pizo Gómez (es)	MF	1990		1	0
=	Ernesto Valverde	FW	1993		1	0
=	José Mari Bakero	MF	1993		1	0
=	Juan Antonio Larrañaga	DF	1993		1	0
=	Bixente Lizarazu	DF	1993		1	0
=	Jokin Uría (es)	DF	1994		1	0
=	Gontzal Suances (es)	FW	1995		1	0
=	Juanjo Valencia	GK	1995		1	0
=	Miguel Ángel Fuentes	DF	1995		1	0
=	Patxi Salinas	DF	1995		1	0
=	Aitor Larrazábal	DF	1997		1	0
=	Luis Pérez	FW	1997		1	0
=	Iñaki Berruet (es)	DF	1998		1	0
=	François Grenet	DF	1998		1	0
=	Txomin Nagore	MF	2000		1	0
=	Ángel Lekumberri (es)	MF	2000		1	0
=	Javi González	MF	2001		1	0
=	Juan Carlos Unzué	GK	2001		1	0
=	Unai	DF	2002		1	0
=	David Karanka	FW	2003		1	0
=	Pablo Gómez	MF	2003		1	0
=	Armando	GK	2005		1	0
=	Raúl García	MF	2005		1	0
=	Ander Murillo	DF	2006		1	0
=	Javier Casas	DF	2006		1	0
=	Javier López Vallejo	GK	2006		1	0
=	Mikel Dañobeitia	FW	2006		1	0
=	Unai Alba	GK	2007		1	0
=	Jon Urzelai	DF	2007		1	0
=	Koikili	DF	2010		1	0
=	Xabi Castillo	DF	2012		1	0
=	Óscar de Marcos	MF	2013		1	0
=	Xabi Irureta	GK	2014		1	0
=	Mikel Arruabarrena	FW	2014		1	0
=	Mikel Oyarzabal*	FW	2016		1	1
=	Oier Olazábal*	GK	2016		1	0
=	Luca Sangalli*	MF	2018		1	0
=	Jon Ander Serantes*	GK	2018		1	0
=	Daniel Vivian*	DF	2019		1	0
=	Unai Bustinza*	DF	2019		1	0
=	Jesús Areso*	DF	2019		1	0
=	Gaizka Larrazabal*	MF	2019		1	0
=	Iñigo Vicente*	FW	2019		1	0
=	Jon Morcillo*	MF	2020		1	0
=	Yeray Álvarez*	DF	2020		1	0
=	Unai Núñez*	DF	2020		1	1
=	Julen Agirrezabala*	GK	2024		1	0
=	Andoni Gorosabel*	DF	2024		1	0
=	Urko González de Zarate*	DF	2024		1	0
=	Imanol*	DF	2024		1	0
=	Jon Pacheco*	DF	2024		1	0
=	Jon Moncayola*	MF	2024		1	0
=	Jon Ander Olasagasti*	MF	2024		1	0
=	Iván Martín*	MF	2024		1	0
=	Malcom Adu Ares*	FW	2024		1	0
=	Álvaro Djaló*	FW	2024		1	1
=	Álex Sola*	FW	2024		1	0
=	Unai Marrero*	GK	2025		1	0
=	Unai García*	DF	2025		1	0
=	Igor Zubeldia*	DF	2025		1	0
=	Iñigo Lekue*	DF	2025		1	0
=	Unai Elgezabal*	DF	2025		1	1
=	Jorge Herrando*	DF	2025		1	0
=	Álvaro Núñez*	DF	2025		1	0
=	Hugo Rincón*	DF	2025		1	0
=	Jon Gorrotxategi*	MF	2025		1	0
=	Jon Guridi*	MF	2025		1	0
=	Pablo Ibáñez*	MF	2025		1	0
=	Iñigo Ruiz de Galarreta*	MF	2025		1	0
=	Mikel Jauregizar*	MF	2025		1	0
=	Kike Barja*	MF	2025		1	0
=	Nico Serrano*	FW	2025		1	0
=	Gorka Guruzeta*	FW	2025		1	1
=	Urko Izeta*	FW	2025		1	1

== FIFA international players from the Basque Country ==
All of the players listed were either born or raised in the Basque region, with most meeting both of those criteria.

- Players in **bold** have won the FIFA World Cup
- Players in underlined have won a continental championships
- Players in italics have won the gold medal at the Olympic Games

As of 31 December 2025

Player	Province	Nation	Caps	From	To	Finals	Basque team
Koldo Álvarez	Álava	Andorra	78	1998	2009	N/A	No
Txema Garcia	Gipuzkoa	Andorra	71	1997	2009	N/A	No
Justo Ruiz	Álava	Andorra	67	1996	2008	N/A	No
Jonás Ramalho	Biscay	Angola	2	2020		N/A	No
Domingo Arrillaga	Gipuzkoa	Argentina	1	1913		N/A	No
Kenan Kodro	Gipuzkoa	Bosnia & Herzegovina	15	2017	2023	N/A	No
Juan Legarreta	Gipuzkoa	Chile	2	1921		N/A	**Yes**
Ramón Unzaga	Biscay	Chile	8	1916	1920	2 (Note: 1916 South American Championship, 1920 South American Championship)	No
Nowend Lorenzo	Navarre	Dominican Republic	18	2021	Active	N/A	No
Álex Balboa	Álava	Equatorial Guinea	16	2021	Active	N/A	No
Juan Cuyami	Gipuzkoa	Equatorial Guinea	2	2003		N/A	No
Gorka Luariz	Gipuzkoa	Equatorial Guinea	2	2018		N/A	No
Jesús Owono	Gipuzkoa	Equatorial Guinea	44	2019	Active	N/A	No
Manuel Anatol	Gipuzkoa	France	16	1929	1934	N/A	No
Philippe Bergeroo	Labourd	France	3	1979	1984	2 (Note: UEFA Euro 1984) (Note: 1986 FIFA World Cup)	No
**Didier Deschamps**	Labourd	France	103	1989	2000	4 (Note: UEFA Euro 1992) (Note: UEFA Euro 1996) (Note: 1998 FIFA World Cup) (Note: UEFA Euro 2000)	No
Jean-Claude Larrieu	Labourd	France	0 (Note: Olympic Games selection only, no full caps.)	1976		1 (Note: 1976 Olympic Games)	No
**Bixente Lizarazu**	Labourd	France	97	1992	2004	5 (Note: 2002 FIFA World Cup) (Note: UEFA Euro 2004)	**Yes**
René Petit	Gipuzkoa	France	2	1920		1 (Note: 1920 Olympic Games)	No
Stéphane Ruffier	Labourd	France	3	2010	2015	1 (Note: 2014 FIFA World Cup)	No
Christian Sarramagna	Labourd	France	4	1973	1976	N/A	No
Iñaki Williams	Navarre	Spain; Ghana	1; 25	2016; 2022	Active	2 (Note: 2022 FIFA World Cup) (Note: 2023 Africa Cup of Nations (played in 2024))	**Yes**
Fernando Minondo	Gipuzkoa	Guatemala	5	1921	1923	N/A	No
José Minondo	Gipuzkoa	Guatemala	4 (Note: Also played in one unofficial International for Spain in 1913: See Spain national football team results (unofficial matches)#1913.)	1921	1923	N/A	No
Jamal Hamed	Gipuzkoa	Palestine	0	2025	Active	N/A	No
Yaser Hamed	Biscay	Palestine	29	2019	Active	N/A	No
Jon Irazabal	Biscay	Malaysia	2	2025	Active	N/A	No
Alex Padilla	Biscay	Mexico	0	2026	Active	N/A	No
Tomas Trigo	Navarre	Philippines	1	2014		N/A	No
Kévin Rodrigues	Labourd	Portugal	3	2017	2018	N/A	No
Cristian Ganea	Biscay	Romania	8	2017	2021	N/A	No
Domingo Acedo	Biscay	Spain	11	1920	1924	2 (Note: 1924 Olympic Games)	**Yes**
Aritz Aduriz	Gipuzkoa	Spain	13	2010	2017	1 (Note: UEFA Euro 2016)	**Yes**
Serafín Aedo	Biscay	Spain	4	1935	1936	N/A	**Yes**
Koldo Aguirre	Biscay	Spain	7	1961	1965	0	**Yes**
Jorge Aizkorreta	Biscay	Spain	0	1996		1 (Note: 1996 Olympic Games)	No
Pedro Alconero (es)	Biscay	Spain	4	1948	1949	N/A	No
Emilio Aldecoa	Biscay	Spain	1	1948		N/A	No
José Ramón Alexanko	Biscay	Spain	34	1978	1982	2 (Note: UEFA Euro 1980) (Note: 1982 FIFA World Cup)	**Yes**
Bittor Alkiza	Gipuzkoa	Spain	3	1998		N/A	**Yes**
Rafael Alkorta	Biscay	Spain	54	1990	1998	4 (Note: 1990 FIFA World Cup) (Note: 1994 FIFA World Cup) (Note: 1998 FIFA World Cup)	**Yes**
Gabriel Alonso	Gipuzkoa	Spain	12	1948	1952	1 (Note: 1950 FIFA World Cup)	No
Juan Alonso	Gipuzkoa	Spain	2	1958	1959	N/A	No
Periko Alonso	Gipuzkoa	Spain	20	1980	1982	1	**Yes**
**Xabi Alonso**	Gipuzkoa	Spain	114	2003	2014	7 (Note: 2006 FIFA World Cup) (Note: UEFA Euro 2008) (Note: 2009 FIFA Confederations Cup) (Note: 2010 FIFA World Cup) (Note: UEFA Euro 2012)	**Yes**
Rafael Alsúa	Gipuzkoa	Spain	2	1954		N/A	No
Miguel de Andrés	Navarre	Spain	2	1984		1 (Note: 1980 Olympic Games)	**Yes**
Amadeo Labarta	Gipuzkoa	Spain	3	1928		1 (Note: 1928 Olympic Games)	**Yes**
Genar Andrinúa	Biscay	Spain	28	1987	1990	2 (Note: UEFA Euro 1988)	**Yes**
Pepe Angoso	Gipuzkoa	Spain	0 (Note: Only played in one unofficial international: See Spain national football team results (unofficial matches)#1913.)	1913		N/A	No
Fernando Ansola	Gipuzkoa	Spain	5	1965	1968	N/A	No
Antero	Biscay	Spain	1	1928		1	No
Antón Martínez (es)	Biscay	Spain	5	1969	1971	N/A	No
Patricio Arabolaza	Gipuzkoa	Spain	5	1920	1921	1	**Yes**
Luis Aranaz (ca)	Navarre	Spain	0 (Note: Only played in two unofficial wartime international matches: See Spain national football team results (unofficial matches)#1937.)	1937	1938	N/A	No (Note: Played for the Catalonia national football team)
Agustín Aranzábal	Gipuzkoa	Spain	28	1995	2003	3 (Note: UEFA Euro 2000)	**Yes**
Matías Aranzábal (es)	Gipuzkoa	Spain	3 (Note: Includes 1 match in 1927 not counted by some sources: See Spain national football team results (unofficial matches).)	1924	1927	N/A	No
José Araquistáin	Gipuzkoa	Spain	6	1960	1962	1 (Note: 1962 FIFA World Cup)	No
Eduardo Arbide	Gipuzkoa	Spain	1	1921		N/A	**Yes**
Luis Arconada	Gipuzkoa	Spain	68	1977	1985	5 (Note: 1978 FIFA World Cup) (Note: UEFA Euro 1984)	**Yes**
Esteban Areta	Navarre	Spain	1	1961		N/A	No
Pedro Areso (es)	Gipuzkoa	Spain	3	1935		N/A	**Yes**
Estanislao Argote	Gipuzkoa	Spain	2	1978		N/A	**Yes**
Antón Arieta	Biscay	Spain	7	1970	1972	N/A	No
Eneko Arieta	Biscay	Spain	3	1955		N/A	No
Salvador Arqueta (es)	Biscay	Spain	1	1942		N/A	No
Mariano Arrate	Gipuzkoa	Spain	6	1920	1923	1	**Yes**
Antonio Arrillaga (es)	Gipuzkoa	Spain	1	1927		N/A	No
Kepa Arrizabalaga	Biscay	Spain	13	2017	2023	1 (Note: 2018 FIFA World Cup)	No
José Luis Artetxe	Biscay	Spain	6	1954	1959	N/A	No
Juan Artola	Gipuzkoa	Spain	2	1920		1	**Yes**
Pedro Artola	Gipuzkoa	Spain	0 (Note: Was selected for the tournament squad but never made his debut.)	1974	1989	1	No
Juan Arzuaga	Biscay	Spain	0	1913		N/A	No
Miguel Ayestarán (es)	Gipuzkoa	Spain	1	1933		N/A	**Yes**
Juan Arza	Navarre	Spain	2	1947	1952	N/A	No
César Azpilicueta	Navarre	Spain	44	2013	2022	6 (Note: 2012 Olympic Games) (Note: 2013 FIFA Confederations Cup) (Note: UEFA Euro 2020 (played in 2021))	No
José Mari Bakero	Navarre	Spain	30	1987	1994	3	**Yes**
Ander Barrenetxea	Gipuzkoa	Spain	0	2026		N/A	No
Bata	Biscay	Spain	1	1931		N/A	**Yes**
Saturnino Belló	Gipuzkoa	Spain	0	1913		N/A	No
Beñat	Biscay	Spain	4	2012		N/A	**Yes**
Txiki Begiristain	Gipuzkoa	Spain	22	1988	1994	2	**Yes**
José María Belauste	Biscay	Spain	3	1920		2	**Yes**
Roberto Bertol	Gipuzkoa	Spain	2	1947	1948	N/A	No
Paco Bienzobas	Gipuzkoa	Spain	2	1928	1929	1	**Yes**
Gregorio Blasco	Biscay	Spain	5	1930	1936	N/A	**Yes**
Iván Campo	Gipuzkoa	Spain	4	1998	2000	1	**Yes**
Canito	Biscay	Spain	1	1957		N/A	No
Domingo Careaga	Biscay	Spain	4	1921	1923	N/A	**Yes**
Carmelo	Biscay	Spain	13	1954	1963	1	**Yes**
Carmelo	Biscay	Spain	10	1922	1928	1	No
Genaro Celayeta (es)	Navarre	Spain	6	1980		N/A	**Yes**
Chirri	Biscay	Spain	5	1924	1925	1	**Yes**
Chirri II	Biscay	Spain	4	1928	1932	N/A	**Yes**
Cholín	Gipuzkoa	Spain	1	1928	1929	1	No
Iñaki Churruca	Gipuzkoa	Spain	16	1971	1977	N/A	**Yes**
Javier Ciáurriz	Navarre	Spain	0	1968		1 (Note: 1968 Olympic Games)	No
Leonardo Cilaurren	Biscay	Spain	14	1931	1935	1 (Note: 1934 FIFA World Cup)	**Yes**
Ciriaco	Gipuzkoa	Spain	14 (Note: Also played in 2 additional unofficial wartime matches in 1937 and 1938: See Spain national football team results (unofficial matches).)	1930	1936	2	**Yes**
Sergio Corino	Biscay	Spain	0	1996		1	No
Dani	Biscay	Spain	25	1977	1981	2	**Yes**
Juan Antonio Deusto (es)	Biscay	Spain	1	1973		N/A	**Yes**
Diego	Gipuzkoa	Spain	1	1980		1	**Yes**
Bonifacio Echeverría	Gipuzkoa	Spain	0	1913		N/A	No
José Echeveste	Gipuzkoa	Spain	4	1922	1927	N/A	No
Ignacio Eizaguirre	Gipuzkoa	Spain	18	1945	1952	1	No
Ramón Eguiazábal	Gipuzkoa	Spain	3	1920		1	**Yes**
Agustín Eizaguirre	Gipuzkoa	Spain	0	1913		1	**Yes**
Julio Elícegui	Navarre	Spain	4	1933		N/A	No
Manuel Elosegi	Gipuzkoa	Spain	0	1913		N/A	No
Emilín	Biscay	Spain	2	1936		N/A	**Yes**
Epi (es)	Gipuzkoa	Spain	15	1941	1949	N/A	No
Juan Errazquin	Gipuzkoa	Spain	6	1925	1928	0 (Note: Errazquin was selected for the 1928 Olympic Games but was not allowed to compete due to his Argentine birthplace and no documents to prove Spanish citizenship)	No
Javier Escalza	Biscay	Spain	5	1978		N/A	**Yes**
Joseba Etxeberria	Gipuzkoa	Spain	53	1997	2004	3	**Yes**
Koldo Etxeberria	Biscay	Spain	4	1962	1963	1	**Yes**
Roberto Etxebarria	Gipuzkoa	Spain	7	1928	1936	N/A	**Yes**
Xabier Etxeita	Biscay	Spain	1	2015		N/A	**Yes**
Fede	Álava	Spain	3	1934		1	No
Patxi Ferreira	Biscay	Spain	2	1988	1989	N/A	**Yes**
Enrique Figueroa	Gipuzkoa	Spain	0	1913		N/A	No
Ramón Gabilondo	Gipuzkoa	Spain	5	1941	1942	N/A	No
Agustín Gaínza	Biscay	Spain	33	1945	1955	1	No
Agustín Gajate	Gipuzkoa	Spain	0	1980		1	**Yes**
Marcelino Gálatas	Gipuzkoa	Spain	1	1927		N/A	No
Francisco Gamborena	Gipuzkoa	Spain	20	1921	1933	2	**Yes**
José Eulogio Gárate	Gipuzkoa	Spain	18	1967	1975	N/A	No
Jesús Garay	Biscay	Spain	29	1953	1962	1	No
David García	Navarre	Spain	3	2023		N/A	No
Raúl García	Navarre	Spain	2	2014		N/A	**Yes** (Note: Played for the Navarre autonomous football team)
Juan Garizurieta (es)	Biscay	Spain	1	1930		N/A	No
Gaztelu	Gipuzkoa	Spain	2	1969	1971	N/A	No
Jesús Glaría	Navarre	Spain	20	1962	1969	N/A	No
Severiano Goiburu	Navarre	Spain	12	1926	1933	N/A	No
Andoni Goikoetxea	Biscay	Spain	39	1983	1988	2	**Yes**
Jon Andoni Goikoetxea	Navarre	Spain	36	1993	2000	1	**Yes**
Guillermo Gorostiza	Biscay	Spain	19	1930	1941	1	**Yes**
Alberto Górriz	Gipuzkoa	Spain	1	1988	1990	1	**Yes**
Julen Guerrero	Biscay	Spain	41	1993	2000	3	**Yes**
Hugo Guillamón	Gipuzkoa	Spain	3	2021	2022	N/A	No
Ander Herrera	Biscay	Spain	2	2016	2017		
Asier del Horno	Biscay	Spain	10	2004	2005	N/A	**Yes**
Iñigo Idiakez	Gipuzkoa	Spain	0	1996		1	**Yes**
Santiago Idígoras	Gipuzkoa	Spain	1	1977		1	**Yes**
José María Igartua	Biscay	Spain	0	1968		1	**Yes**
Silvestre Igoa	Gipuzkoa	Spain	10	1948	1950	1	No
Asier Illarramendi	Gipuzkoa	Spain	3	2017		N/A	**Yes**
Andoni Imaz	Gipuzkoa	Spain	1	1993		N/A	**Yes**
Juan Antonio Ipiña	Biscay	Spain	6 (Note: Also played in 1 additional unofficial wartime match in 1937: See Spain national football team results (unofficial matches).)	1936	1946	N/A	No
Andoni Iraola	Gipuzkoa	Spain	7	2008	2011	N/A	**Yes**
José Iraragorri	Biscay	Spain	7	1931	1936	1	**Yes**
José Ángel Iribar	Gipuzkoa	Spain	49	1964	1976	2 (Note: 1964 European Nations' Cup) (Note: 1966 FIFA World Cup)	**Yes**
Rafael Iriondo	Biscay	Spain	2	1946	1947	N/A	No
Javier Irureta	Gipuzkoa	Spain	6	1972	1975	N/A	**Yes**
Ander Iturraspe	Biscay	Spain	2	2014		N/A	**Yes**
Jesús Izaguirre (es)	Gipuzkoa	Spain	0	1928		1	No
José María Jáuregui	Biscay	Spain	3	1928		1	No
Juanín	Biscay	Spain	2	1925	1927	N/A	No
Antonio Juantegui	Gipuzkoa	Spain	1	1924		1	No
Juan Jugo (es)	Biscay	Spain	1	1946		N/A	No
Aitor Karanka	Álava	Spain	1	1995		1	**Yes**
Kiriki	Gipuzkoa	Spain	3	1928		1	No
Inaxio Kortabarria	Gipuzkoa	Spain	4	1976	1977	N/A	**Yes**
José María Laca	Biscay	Spain	1	1924		N/A	No
Mari Lacruz	Navarre	Spain	0	2000		1 (Note: 2000 Olympic Games)	No
Lafuente	Biscay	Spain	8	1927	1935	1	**Yes**
Isidro Lángara	Gipuzkoa	Spain	12	1932	1936	1	**Yes**
Aymeric Laporte	Biscay (Note: Laporte gained Spanish citizenship due to time spent living in Biscay (2010 to 2018).)	Spain	43	2021	Active	3 (Note: UEFA Euro 2024)	No
Iñigo Larrainzar	Navarre	Spain	1	1994		N/A	**Yes**
Juan Antonio Larrañaga	Gipuzkoa	Spain	1	1988		N/A	**Yes**
Jesús Larraza	Biscay	Spain	1	1924		1	No
Enrique Larrinaga	Biscay	Spain	1	1933		N/A	**Yes**
Mikel Lasa	Gipuzkoa	Spain	2	1993		1 (Note: 1992 Olympic Games)	**Yes**
Jaime Lazcano	Navarre	Spain	5	1929	1930	N/A	No
Simón Lecue	Biscay	Spain	7	1934	1936	1	No
José Legarreta	Biscay	Spain	1	1928		1	No
Robin Le Normand	Gipuzkoa	Spain (Note: Le Normand gained Spanish citizenship due to time spent living in Gipuzkoa (2016 to 2023).)	27	2023	Active	1	No
Raimundo Lezama	Biscay	Spain	1	1947		N/A	No
Iñigo Liceranzu	Biscay	Spain	1	1985		N/A	No
**Fernando Llorente**	Navarre	Spain	24	2008	2013	3	**Yes**
Julen Lopetegui	Gipuzkoa	Spain	1	1994		1	**Yes**
Aitor López Rekarte	Gipuzkoa	Spain	1	2004		N/A	**Yes**
Luis López Rekarte	Gipuzkoa	Spain	4	1988		N/A	**Yes**
Roberto López Ufarte	Gipuzkoa	Spain	20	1980	1982	1	**Yes**
José María Maguregui	Biscay	Spain	7	1955	1957	N/A	No
Manolín	Biscay	Spain	1	1953		N/A	No
Rafael Marañón	Navarre	Spain	4	1977	1978	1	**Yes**
Martín Marculeta	Gipuzkoa	Spain	15	1928	1935	2	**Yes**
Luis Marín	Gipuzkoa	Spain	0	1934		1	**Yes**
Ángel Mariscal	Gipuzkoa	Spain	2	1928		1	No
Enrique Martín	Navarre	Spain	2	1982		N/A	No
Iñigo Martínez	Biscay	Spain	21	2013	Active	1	**Yes**
**Javi Martínez**	Navarre	Spain	18	2010	2014	5	**Yes**
Mauri	Biscay	Spain	5	1955	1956	N/A	**Yes**
Juan José Mencía (es)	Biscay	Spain	1	1951		N/A	No
Andrés Mendieta	Biscay	Spain	0	1968		1	No
Gaizka Mendieta	Biscay	Spain	40	1999	2002	3	**Yes**
Mikel Merino	Navarre	Spain	41	2020	Active	2 (Note: 2020 Olympic Games (played in 2021))	No
Juan José Mieza (es)	Biscay	Spain	2	1941		N/A	No
Jon Moncayola	Navarre	Spain	0	2021	Active	1	No
Nacho Monreal	Navarre	Spain	22	2009	2018	2	No
José Muguerza	Gipuzkoa	Spain	9	1930	1936	1	**Yes**
Mundo	Biscay	Spain	3	1941	1942	N/A	No
Iker Muniain	Navarre	Spain	2	2012	2019	1	**Yes**
Nando	Biscay	Spain	8	1947	1951	1	No
Unai Núñez	Biscay	Spain	1	2019		N/A	**Yes**
Isaac Oceja	Biscay	Spain	4	1941	1942	N/A	No
José Manuel Ochotorena	Gipuzkoa	Spain	1	1989		1	No
Álvaro Odriozola	Gipuzkoa	Spain	4	2017	2018	1	No
Alfonso Olaso	Gipuzkoa	Spain	1	1927		N/A	No
Luis Olaso	Gipuzkoa	Spain	4	1921	1927	N/A	No
Manuel Olivares	Gipuzkoa	Spain	1	1930		N/A	**Yes**
Sebastián Ontoria	Gipuzkoa	Spain	1	1950		N/A	No
Pablo Orbaiz	Navarre	Spain	4	2002	2005	N/A	**Yes**
José Orúe	Biscay	Spain	3	1953	1957	N/A	No
Mikel Oyarzabal	Gipuzkoa	Spain	51	2016	Active	3	**Yes**
Pagaza	Biscay	Spain	7	1920	1922	1	**Yes**
Pasieguito	Gipuzkoa	Spain	4	1954		N/A	No
José Luis Panizo	Biscay	Spain	14	1946	1953	1	No
Javi de Pedro	Gipuzkoa	Spain	12	1998	2004	1	**Yes**
José María Peña	Biscay	Spain	21	1921	1930	1	**Yes**
Chus Pereda	Biscay	Spain	15	1960	1968	1	No
Pichichi	Biscay	Spain	5	1920		1	**Yes**
Pachuco Prats (es)	Biscay	Spain	9	1927	1930	N/A	No
José María Querejeta (es)	Gipuzkoa	Spain	2	1947		N/A	No
Jacinto Quincoces	Biscay	Spain	25	1928	1936	2	**Yes**
Quincoces	Álava	Spain	8	1957	1959	N/A	No
Luis Regueiro	Gipuzkoa	Spain	25	1927	1936	1	**Yes**
Pedro Regueiro	Gipuzkoa	Spain	5	1927	1936	N/A	**Yes**
Álex Remiro	Navarre	Spain	2	2024	Active	1	No
Eusebio Ríos	Biscay	Spain	1	1964		N/A	No
Roberto Ríos	Biscay	Spain	11	1996	1997	N/A	**Yes**
Robus	Biscay	Spain	1	1928		1	No
José Ángel Rojo	Biscay	Spain	1	1973		N/A	**Yes**
Txetxu Rojo	Biscay	Spain	18	1969	1978	N/A	**Yes**
Ángel María Rousse (es)	Biscay	Spain	1	1924		N/A	No
Félix Ruiz	Navarre	Spain	4	1961	1963	N/A	No
Sabino	Biscay	Spain	2	1920		1	No
Iñaki Sáez	Biscay	Spain	3	1968		N/A	No
Manuel Sagarzazu	Gipuzkoa	Spain	2	1927		1	No
Julio Salinas	Biscay	Spain	56	1986	1996	5	**Yes**
Patxi Salinas	Biscay	Spain	2	1988		N/A	**Yes**
Mikel San José	Navarre	Spain	7	2014	2016	1	**Yes**
Oihan Sancet	Navarre	Spain	4	2023	Active	N/A	No
Juan Ramón Santiago (es)	Biscay	Spain	2	1942		N/A	No
Manu Sarabia	Biscay	Spain	15	1983	1985	1	**Yes**
Jesús María Satrústegui	Navarre	Spain	32	1975	1982	2	**Yes**
Félix Sesúmaga	Biscay	Spain	8	1920	1923	1	No
Silverio	Gipuzkoa	Spain	1	1920		1	No
Unai Simón	Álava	Spain	56	2020	Active	4	No
Juan Cruz Sol	Gipuzkoa	Spain	28	1970	1976	N/A	No
Enrique Soladrero	Biscay	Spain	1 (Note: Also played in 1 additional unofficial wartime match in 1938: See Spain national football team results (unofficial matches).)	1935		N/A	No
Markel Susaeta	Gipuzkoa	Spain	1	2012		N/A	**Yes**
Tiko	Navarre	Spain	1	2002		N/A	**Yes**
Travieso	Biscay	Spain	1	1922		N/A	**Yes**
Trino	Gipuzkoa	Spain	3	1928		1	No
Pedro Uralde	Álava	Spain	3	1982	1986	1	**Yes**
Fidel Uriarte	Biscay	Spain	9	1968	1972	N/A	No
Santiago Urquiaga	Biscay	Spain	14	1980	1984	3	**Yes**
Juan Urquizu	Biscay	Spain	1	1929		N/A	**Yes**
Javier	Gipuzkoa	Spain	5	1978	1980	4	**Yes**
Ismael Urtubi	Biscay	Spain	2	1984	1985	N/A	**Yes**
Ismael Urzaiz	Navarre	Spain	25	1996	2001	1	**Yes**
Pedro Vallana	Biscay	Spain	12	1920	1928	3	**Yes**
Ernesto Valverde	Álava	Spain	1	1990		N/A	**Yes**
Joaquín Vázquez	Gipuzkoa	Spain	1	1920		1	No
Venancio	Biscay	Spain	11	1949	1954	N/A	No
Julián Vergara (es)	Navarre	Spain	0 (Note: Only played in two unofficial wartime international matches: See Spain national football team results (unofficial matches)#1937.)	1937	1938	N/A	No
Unai Vergara	Navarre	Spain	1	2001		1	**Yes**
Manuel Vidal	Biscay	Spain	1	1927		N/A	No
David Villabona	Gipuzkoa	Spain	0	1992		1	**Yes**
Ángel María Villar	Biscay	Spain	22	1973	1979	N/A	**Yes**
Alberto Villaverde (eu)	Gipuzkoa	Spain	0	1928		1	No
Dani Vivian	Álava	Spain	10	2024	Active	1	**Yes**
Nico Williams	Navarre	Spain	30	2022	Active	2	No
José Maria Yermo	Biscay	Spain	5	1927	1928	1	No
Mariano Yurrita (es)	Gipuzkoa	Spain	2	1929		1	No
José Luis Zabala	Gipuzkoa	Spain	2	1923		1	**Yes**
Pedro Zabalza	Navarre	Spain	7	1968	1969	N/A	No
Domingo Zaldúa	Gipuzkoa	Spain	5	1927	1928	1	No
José Antonio Zaldúa	Navarre	Spain	3	1961	1962	N/A	No
Jesús María Zamora	Gipuzkoa	Spain	30	1974	1989	2	**Yes**
Zarra	Biscay	Spain	20	1945	1951	1	No
José María Zárraga	Biscay	Spain	8	1955	1958	N/A	No
José Ángel Ziganda	Navarre	Spain	2	1991	1994	N/A	**Yes**
Ignacio Zoco	Navarre	Spain	25	1961	1969	2	No
Ángel Zubieta	Biscay	Spain	2	1936		N/A	**Yes**
Martín Zubimendi	Gipuzkoa	Spain	24	2021	Active	2	No
Andoni Zubizarreta	Gipuzkoa	Spain	126	1985	1998	7	**Yes**
Agustín Gómez Pagóla	Gipuzkoa	Soviet Union	0	1952		1 (Note: 1952 Olympic Games)	No
Fernando Amorebieta	Biscay	Venezuela	15	2011	2015	1 (Note: 2015 Copa América)	**Yes**
Jon Aramburu	Gipuzkoa	Venezuela	18	2023	Active	1 (Note: 2024 Copa América)	No

== See also ==
- Basque Football Federation
- List of Basque female footballers
- List of France international footballers
- List of Spain international footballers
- Athletic Bilbao signing policy
- List of Athletic Bilbao players
- List of Real Sociedad players
- Navarre autonomous football team
