= 1923–24 Real Madrid CF season =

22nd season in existence of Real Madrid CF

Real Madrid
1923–24 season
- President: Pedro Parages
- Manager: Juan de Cárcer
- Stadium: Campo de Ciudad Lineal; Estadio Chamartín
- Campeonato Regional Centro (Note: The Campeonato Regional Centro (Central Regional Championship) was a regional league used as a qualifier for the Copa del Rey.): 1st
- Copa del Rey: Runners-up
- Top goalscorer: League: Monjardín (7); All: Monjardín (13)
- Biggest win: Unión SC 0–5 Real Madrid
- Biggest defeat: Athletic Bilbao 3–1 Real Madrid
Home colours	Away colours

The 1923–24 season was Real Madrid Club de Fútbol's 22nd season in existence. The club played some friendly matches. They also played in the Campeonato Regional Centro (Central Regional Championship) and the Copa del Rey.

== Summary ==
Real Madrid left the Campo de Ciudad Lineal which they had adopted as their home stadium the previous season and moved to the Estadio Chamartín. The stadium was inaugurated on 17 May 1924 with a 3–2 victory over Newcastle United.

== Players ==
Note: Flags indicate national team as defined under FIFA eligibility rules; some limited exceptions apply. Players may hold more than one non-FIFA nationality.

No.	Pos.	Nation	Player
—	GK	ESP	Cándido Martínez
—	GK	ESP	José Antonio Ortueta
—	DF	ESP	Félix Quesada
—	DF	ESP	Guillermo Yllera
—	DF	ESP	Patricio Escobal
—	MF	ESP	Ernesto Mejía
—	MF	ESP	Manuel Valderrama
—	MF	SUI	Adolphe Mengotti
—	MF	ESP	Félix Contreras Dueñas
—	MF	ESP	Antonio Sicilia Mendo

No.	Pos.	Nation	Player
—	MF	ESP	Antonio Calleja
—	MF	ESP	Juan Pablo Barrero
—	FW	ESP	Félix Pérez
—	FW	ESP	José María Muñagorri
—	FW	ESP	Gerónimo del Campo
—	FW	ESP	Juan Monjardín
—	FW	ESP	Antonio de Miguel
—	MF	ESP	Ignacio Méndez de Vigo
—	FW	ESP	Manuel Muñagorri Berraondo
—	FW	ESP	Santiago Bernabéu

== Friendlies ==
22 September 1923 Friendly	Real Madrid (Spain)	4–0	(Poland) KS Cracovia	Madrid, Spain
		Report		Stadium: Campo de Ciudad Lineal

23 September 1923 Friendly	Real Madrid (Spain)	4–2	(Poland) KS Cracovia	Madrid, Spain
		Report		Stadium: Campo de Ciudad Lineal

29 September 1923 Friendly	Real Madrid (Spain)	1–1	(Germany) SpVgg Greuther Fürth	Madrid, Spain
		Report		Stadium: Campo de Ciudad Lineal

30 September 1923 Friendly	Real Madrid (Spain)	1–2	(Germany) SpVgg Greuther Fürth	Madrid, Spain
		Report		Stadium: Campo de Ciudad Lineal

12 October 1923 Friendly	Real Madrid	2–1	Natación Alicante	Madrid
		Report		Stadium: Campo de Ciudad Lineal

8 November 1923 Friendly	Real Madrid	3–2	Celta de Vigo	Madrid
		Report		Stadium: Campo de Ciudad Lineal

16 December 1923 Friendly	Real Sociedad	6–3	Real Madrid	San Sebastián
		Report		Stadium: Atotxa Stadium

25 December 1923 Friendly	Real Madrid	1–0	AD Ferroviaria	Madrid
		Report		Stadium: Campo de Ciudad Lineal

11 March 1923 Friendly	Athletic Madrid	3–3	Real Madrid	Madrid
		Report		Stadium: C. Salamanca

17 May 1924 Friendly	Real Madrid (Spain)	3–2	(England) Newcastle United	Madrid, Spain
	Felix Pérez; Frazer (o.g.)	Report	Gibson 10'; McDonald	Stadium: Estadio Chamartín; Referee: Rocamora

29 May 1924 Friendly	Real Madrid	1–6	Real Sociedad	Madrid
		Report		Stadium: Estadio Chamartín

7 June 1924 Friendly	Real Madrid (Spain)	1–1	(Scotland) Dundee F.C.	Madrid, Spain
		Report		Stadium: Estadio Chamartín

8 June 1924 Friendly - Reserve	Real Madrid (Spain)	1–2	(Scotland) Dundee F.C.	Madrid, Spain
		Report		Stadium: Estadio Chamartín
Note: Real Madrid fielded its reserve team for this match.

14 June 1924 Friendly - Reserve	Gibraltar F.C.	4–3	(Spain) Real Madrid	Gibraltar
		Report
Note: Real Madrid fielded its reserve team for this match.

28 June 1924 Friendly	Elche CF	1–2	Real Madrid	Elche
		Report		Stadium: El Clot

29 June 1924 Friendly	Elche CF	1–1	Real Madrid	Elche
		Report		Stadium: El Clot

== Competitions ==
=== Overview ===
Competition	First match	Last match	Starting round	Final position	Record							
Competition	First match	Last match	Starting round	Final position	Pld	W	D	L	GF	GA	GD	Win %
Campeonato Regional Centro	28 October 1923	9 March 1924	Matchday 1	Winners	8	6	2	0	21	7	+14	75.00
Copa del Rey	28 March 1920	4 April 1920	Quarter-finals	Runners-up	6	4	0	2	13	6	+7	66.67
Total					14	10	2	2	34	13	+21	71.43

Source: Competitions

=== Campeonato Regional Centro ===
==== League table ====
Pos	Team	Pld	W	D	L	GF	GA	GD	Pts	Qualification
1	Real Madrid (C, Q)	8	6	2	0	21	7	+14	14	Qualification for the Copa del Rey.
2	Racing Madrid	8	3	3	2	13	13	0	9	
3	Athletic Madrid	8	4	0	4	13	11	+2	8	
4	RS Gimnástica	8	3	2	3	7	10	−3	8	
5	Unión SC (O)	8	0	1	7	8	21	−13	1	Qualification for the relegation play-offs

Source: Rec.Sport.Soccer Statistics Foundation
Rules for classification: 1) points; 2) goal difference; 3) number of goals scored.
(C) Champions; (O) Play-off winners; (Q) Qualified for the phase indicated

==== Matches ====
28 October 1923 1	Real Madrid	2–1	Athletic Madrid	Madrid
	Monjardín 86', 89'	Report	Pololo 40' (pen.)	Stadium: Campo de Ciudad Lineal; Referee: Lloveras

4 November 1923 2	RS Gimnástica	0–2	Real Madrid	Madrid
		Report	Félix Pérez 80'; Santiago Bernabéu 85'	Stadium: Gimnástica; Referee: Cruella

2 December 1923 3	Unión SC	0–5	Real Madrid	Madrid
		Report	Félix Pérez; Monjardín; Quesada (pen.); Valderrama; Muñagorri	Stadium: Gimnástica; Referee: Lloveras

9 December 1923 4	Racing de Madrid	1–1	Real Madrid	Madrid
	R. Alvárez	Report	Mejía 80'	Stadium: Estadio Metropolitano; Referee: Lloveras

6 January 1924 5	Real Madrid	5–1	RS Gimnástica	Madrid
	Valmaseda (o.g.); Quesada (pen.), (pen.); Monjardín; Félix Pérez	Report	Echevarría	Stadium: Campo de Ciudad Lineal; Referee: Fermín Sánchez

20 January 1925 6	Athletic Madrid	0–1	Real Madrid	Madrid
		Report	Monjardín 72'	Stadium: Campo de Ciudad Lineal; Referee: Torrens

2 March 1924 7	Real Madrid	4–3	Unión SC	Madrid
	Monjardín, 30'; Mengotti; Santiago Bernabéu	Report	Zugázaga	Stadium: Campo de Ciudad Lineal; Referee: Gómez

9 March 1924 8	Real Madrid	1–1	Racing de Madrid	Madrid
	Muñagorri	Report	Caballero	Stadium: Campo de Ciudad Lineal; Referee: Gómez

=== Copa del Rey ===
==== Quarterfinals ====
23 March 1924 First leg	Real Madrid	4–0	Natación Alicante	Madrid
	Quesada (pen.); Monjardín; Valderrama	Report		Stadium: Campo de Ciudad Lineal; Referee: Serrano

30 March 1924 Second leg	Natación Alicante	2–4	Real Madrid	Alicante
	Ramonzuelo 10',	Report	Valderrama; Monjardín	Referee: Balaguer

==== Semifinals ====
6 April 1924 First leg	Athletic Bilbao	3–1	Real Madrid	Bilbao
	Larracoechea; Carmelo 71'; Larracoechea	Report	Santiago Bernabéu	Stadium: Estadio San Mamés; Referee: Cruella

13 April 1924 Second leg	Real Madrid	3–0	Athletic Bilbao	Madrid
	Valderrama 46'; Monjardín; Félix Pérez	Report		Stadium: Estadio Metropolitano; Referee: Cruella

15 April 1924 Replay	Real Madrid	1–0	Athletic Bilbao	Madrid
	Monjardín 74'	Report		Stadium: Estadio Metropolitano; Referee: Balaguer

==== Final ====
6 April 1924 Final	Real Unión	1–0	Real Madrid	San Sebastián
	Echeveste 62'	Report		Stadium: Atotxa Stadium; Referee: Sánchez
