= José María Urresti =

Spanish footballer (1902–1968)

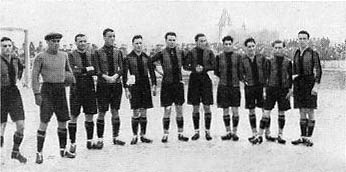
- Urresti with the Arenas team in 1927

Personal information
- Full name: José María Urresti Urquiza
- Date of birth: 2 January 1902
- Place of birth: Getxo, Biscay, Spain
- Date of death: 10 May 1968 (aged 66)
- Height: 1.78 m (5 ft 10 in)
- Position: Defender

Senior career*
Years	Team	Apps	(Gls)
1924–1934	Arenas de Getxo	51	(1)
- * Club domestic league appearances and goals

José María Urresti Urquiza (2 January 1902 – 10 May 1968) was a Spanish footballer who played as a defender for Arenas de Getxo between 1924 and 1934. A historical member of Arenas de Getxo in the inter-war period, he is a member of the so-called one-club men group.

== Biography ==
Born in Getxo, Biscay, Urresti began his football career at his hometown club Arenas de Getxo in 1924, aged 22. Together with José María Jáuregui, Pedro Vallana, and José Maria Yermo, Urresti played a crucial role in the Arenas team that played two Copa del Rey finals in the mid-1920s, losing against Barcelona in 1925 (2–0), and two years later against Real Unión (1–0), the latter being the only all-Basque decisive match in the competition's history not to feature Athletic Bilbao. Two weeks after the final, on 29 May, Urresti was among the four Arenas players who reinforced Athletic Bilbao for a friendly match against Motherwell, helping his side to a 3–1 win.

In 1929, Arenas was one of the 10 founding clubs of La Liga, and on 10 February, Urresti was one of the eleven footballers who played in Arenas' first match in the Spanish top division, which ended in a 3–2 loss to Atlético Madrid, thus becoming the first-ever team to lose at home. On 29 March 1931, Urresti scored the only goal of the match in the 65th minute to seal a 1–0 victory over CE Europa, which was enough to definitively condemn Europa, bottom of the table, to relegation.

Urresti stayed loyal to the club until 1934, the year in which he decided to retire, aged 32. In total, he scored 4 goals in 87 La Liga matches.

== Honours ==
Arenas de Getxo

- Copa del Rey runner-up: 1927
