= 1927 Copa del Rey final =

- Event: 1927 Copa del Rey
Real Unión	Arenas Club
1	0
- After extra-time
- Date: 15 May 1927
- Venue: Estadio Torrero, Zaragoza
- Referee: Pedro Escartín
- Attendance: 16,000

The 1927 Copa del Rey final was the 27th final of the Spanish cup competition, the Copa del Rey. The final was played at Torrero, in Zaragoza, on 15 May 1927. Real Unión beat Arenas Club de Getxo 1–0 and won their third and last title (fourth title counting the trophy won by Racing de Irun in 1913). The only goal of the match was scored in extra-time by José Echeveste.

== Summary ==
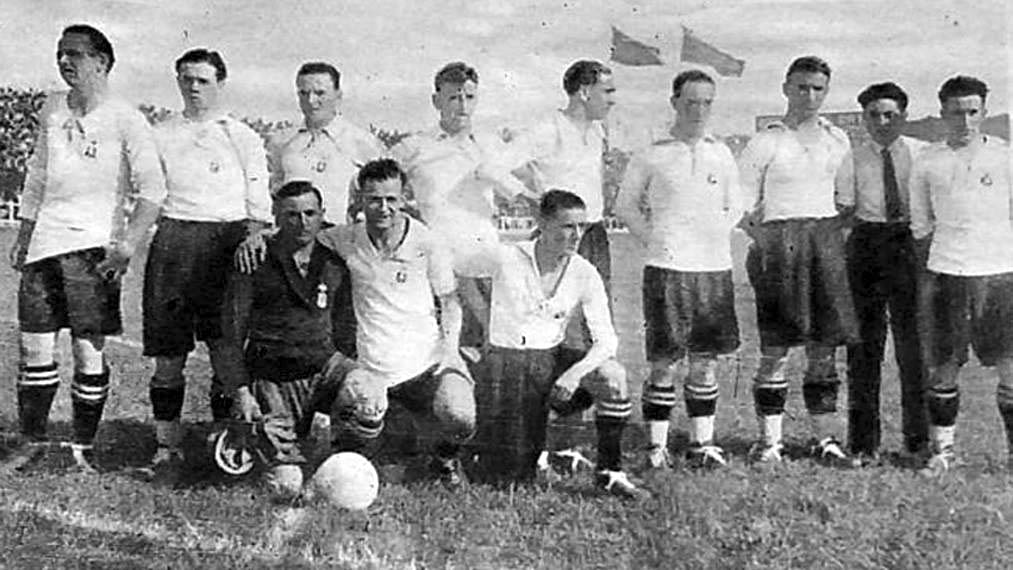
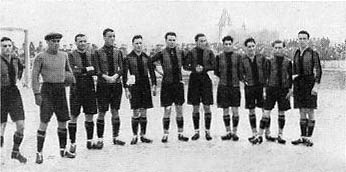
Teams of Real Unión (left) and Arenas (right)

On 15 May, the Real Unión de Irún played against the Arenas Club de Guecho at the Estadio Torrero, Zaragoza, which presented a packed stadium at five in the afternoon. This meeting went down in history because it was the first to be broadcast on the radio, specifically by Unión Radio de Madrid. The Irundarras, who had two great figures of the time in their team, such as Gamborenea and René Petit, the latter as an offensive reference, beat Sporting de Gijón in the quarter-finals and then in the semifinal they eliminated Real Madrid with a 2–0 win, courtesy of Gamborenea and Echeveste. On the other hand, Arenas had eliminated Celta de Vigo and FC Barcelona in a single-leg semi-final. This victory was especially heartfelt because Arenas were taking revenge for what happened in 1925 when the Catalans took the Cup after beating Arenas 2–0 in the final. The game was tight and René Petit had a golden chance from 12 yards, but he failed to convert a penalty that would have done justice to Unión. The game thus ended with a goalless draw in its 90 regulation minutes, which forced extra time, where Irundarras still managed to find a way when Echeveste, after receiving a pass from Villaverde, scored the only goal of the match with just three minutes to go.

== Match details ==
15 May 1927
17:15 CET

Real Unión	1–0 (a.e.t.)	Arenas Club de Getxo
Echeveste 117'	Report

Estadio Torrero, Zaragoza
Attendance: 16,000
Referee: Pedro Escartín

Real Unión	Arenas

GK	1	(Spain) Emery II
DF	2	(Spain) Manuel Alza
DF	3	(Spain) Ignacio Berges
MF	4	(Spain) Pedro Regueiro
MF	5	(Spain) Francisco Gamborena
MF	6	(Spain) Alberto Villaverde
FW	7	(Spain) Manuel Sagarzazu
FW	8	(Spain) Luis Regueiro
FW	9	(France) René Petit
FW	10	(Spain) José Echeveste
FW	11	(Spain) Emilio Garmendia

GK	1	(Spain) José María Jáuregui
DF	2	(Spain) Ricardo Llantada
DF	3	(Spain) Crepúsculo Sesúmaga
MF	4	(Spain) Antonio Laña
MF	5	(Spain) José María Urresti
MF	6	(Spain) Fidel Sesúmaga
FW	7	(Spain) Justo de Anduiza
FW	8	(Spain) Javier Rivero
FW	9	(Spain) José María Yermo
FW	10	(Spain) Manuel Gurruchaga
FW	11	(Spain) Robustiano Bilbao

Copa del Rey 1927 winners
Real Unión
3rd title

== See also ==
- Basque football derbies
