= Yermo =

Yermo may refer to:

- Yermo, California, a town in the United States
- Yermo (plant), a genus of the tribe Senecioneae and the family Asteraceae
- José Maria Yermo, Spanish footballer
