= Gabarain =

Gabarain or Gabaráin is a Basque surname. Notable people with the surname include:

- Cesáreo Gabaráin (1936–1991), Spanish priest and composer
- Iker Gabarain (born 1977), Spanish footballer
