= 1924 Copa del Rey final =

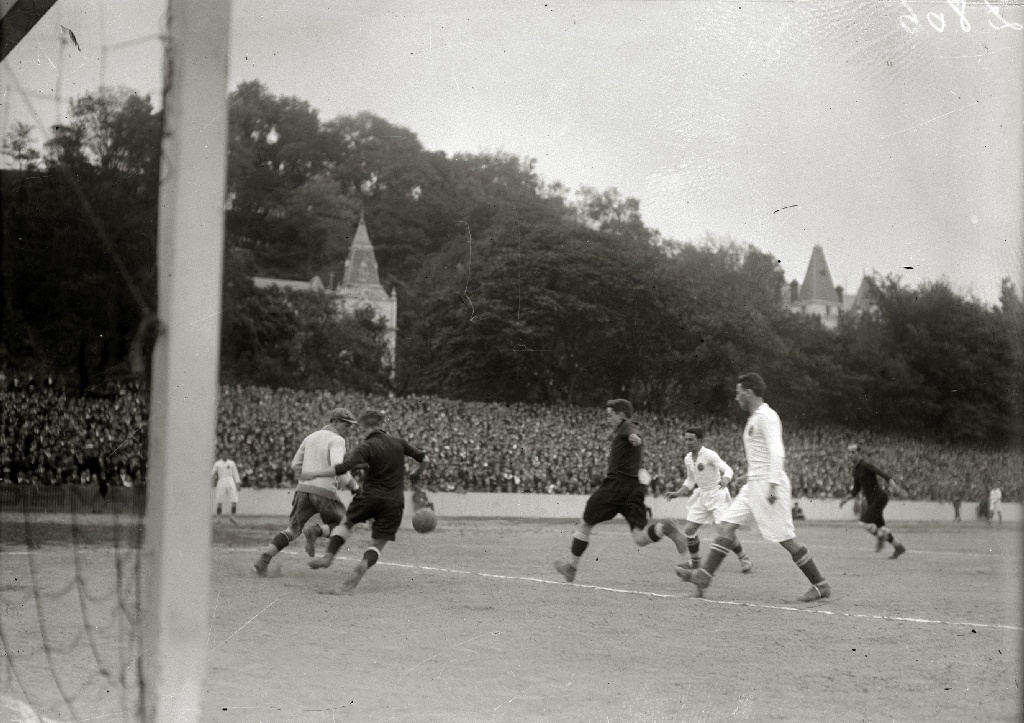
- Scene of the match
- Event: 1924 Copa del Rey
Real Unión	Real Madrid
1	0
- Date: May 4, 1924
- Venue: Atotxa, San Sebastián
- Referee: Fermín Sánchez

The 1924 Copa del Rey final was the 24th final of the Spanish cup competition, the Copa del Rey. The final was played at Atotxa Stadium, in San Sebastián, on 4 May 1924. Real Unión beat Real Madrid 1–0, winning their second title (third title counting the trophy won by Racing de Irun in 1913). The only goal was scored by José Echeveste.

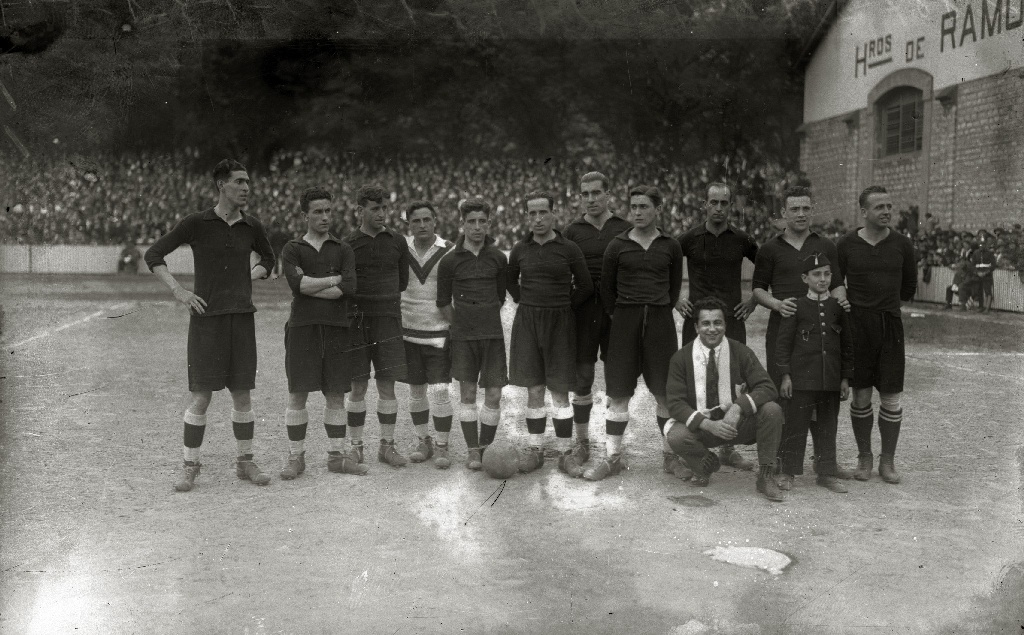
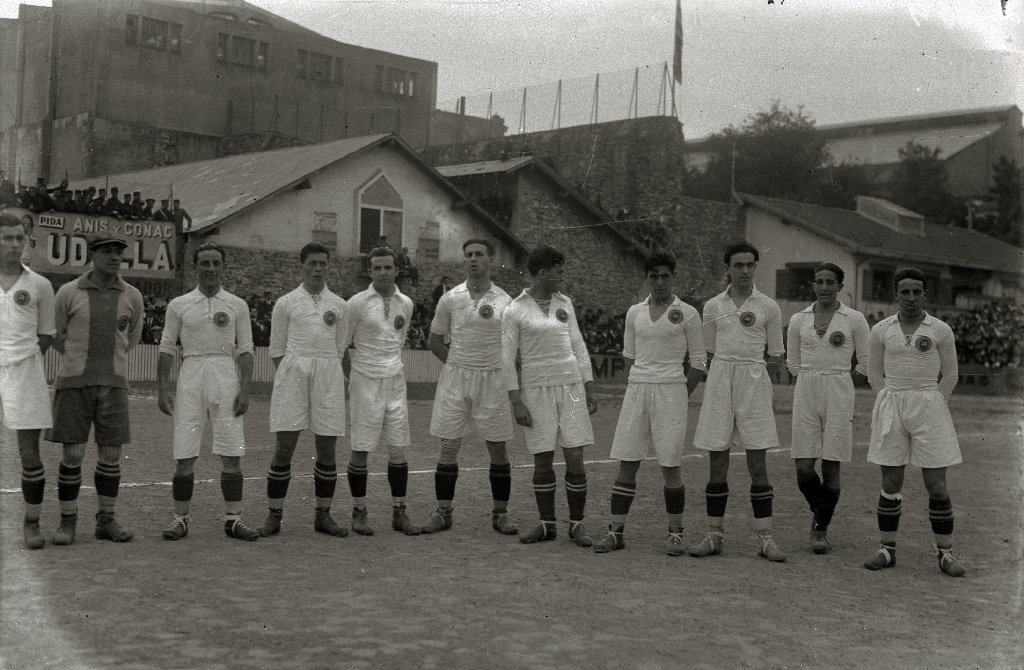
Teams of Real Unión (left, in black) and Real Madrid that played the final

== Match details ==
4 May 1924

Real Unión	1–0	Real Madrid
Echeveste 58'	Report

Atotxa, San Sebastián
Referee: Fermín Sánchez

Real Unión	Real Madrid

GK	1	(Spain) Antonio Emery "Emery II"
DF	2	(France) Manuel Anatol
DF	3	(Spain) Ignacio Berges
MF	4	(Spain) Francisco Gamborena
MF	5	(France) René Petit
MF	6	(Spain) Ramón Eguiazábal
FW	7	(Spain) José Echeveste
FW	8	(Spain) Joaquín Vázquez
FW	9	(Spain) Juan Errazquin
FW	10	(Spain) Matías Aguinaga
FW	11	(Spain) Ramón Azurza
Manager:
(England) Steve Bloomer

GK	1	(Spain) Cándido Martínez
DF	2	(Spain) Félix Quesada
DF	3	(Spain) Pedro Escobal
MF	4	(Spain) Juan Pablo Barrero
MF	5	(Switzerland) Adolphe Mengotti
MF	6	(Spain) Ernesto Mejía
FW	7	(Spain) José María Muñagorri
FW	8	(Spain) Manuel Valderrama
FW	9	(Spain) Juan Monjardín
FW	10	(Spain) Félix Pérez
FW	11	(Spain) Gerónimo del Campo
Manager:
(Spain) Juan de Cárcer

Copa del Rey 1924 winners
Real Unión
2nd title
