= Urresti =

Urresti is a Spanish surname. Notable people with the surname include:

- Alfonso de Urresti (born 1966), Chilean lawyer and politician
- Daniel Urresti (born 1956), Peruvian retired army general and politician
- José María Urresti (1902–1968), Spanish footballer
