= Manuel Valderrama =

Spanish footballer (1904-unknown)

Personal information
- Full name: Manuel Fernández de Valderrama Tejedor
- Date of birth: 29 July 1904
- Place of birth: Madrid, Spain
- Date of death: Unknown
- Position: Midfielder

Senior career*
Years	Team	Apps	(Gls)
1920–1923	Recreativo Español		
1923–1924	Real Madrid		
1924–1930	Racing de Madrid		
1928	→Celta de Vigo (on loan)		
1930–1931	Real Madrid		
1932–1933	Atlético Madrid		
1934–1936	AD Ferroviaria		

International career
1923	Madrid	1	(0)
1927	Spain	1	(0)
1927	Spain B	1	(1)

Managerial career
- 1939–1940: Recreativo Granada
- 1940–1941: Cádiz CF
- 1947–1948: Granada CF
- * Club domestic league appearances and goals

Manuel Fernández de Valderrama Tejedor (29 July 1904 - Unknown) was a Spanish footballer who played as a midfielder and later a manager. He represented the three biggest Madrid teams of the 1920s and 30s, Real Madrid, Atlético Madrid and Racing de Madrid, and also earned one cap for Spain in 1927.

== Early life ==
Valderrama was born on 29 July 1904 (Note: Former Real Madrid goalkeeper Eduardo Teus said in his book about the white club that Valderrama was born in 1902) in Madrid, near Parque del Retiro, and it was there, in La Chopera, in 1919, where he began playing football.

== Club career ==
Valderrama was an excellent dribbler and finished with both legs and his head, thus everyone wanted to have him as a partner every Sunday when they split up to play a match. He was a phenomenon since he was little and continued to be one when he grew up, having the intelligence to perform several tricks along with an impeccable header. His first team was Patria Balompie, but where he began to play seriously was at Recreativo Español. While there, he met two other excellent footballers who would later be his teammates in Madrid: the left defender Félix Quesada and the left interior Félix Pérez.

After a time at Recreativo, Valderrama signed for Real Madrid ahead of the 1923–24 season, helping the club to win the regional championship with one goal in five matches, thus qualifying for the 1924 Copa del Rey, where he scored 3 goals in six matches to help the club reach the final, which they lost 0–1 to Real Unión, courtesy of a goal from José Echeveste. Even though he played several games, Valderrama considered himself Santiago Bernabéu's substitute and decided to leave the club at the end of the season, moving to Racing de Madrid, for whom he played for 6 seasons until 1930.

In the summer of 1928, Valderrama briefly joined Celta de Vigo to take part in its trip to South America alongside other reinforcements from Deportivo, Racing de Ferrol, and Sevilla FC among others. Celta played three friendlies in Buenos Aires, two in Uruguay, and one in Rosario, losing all of them sept for one in the Argentina capital, with Valderrama attributed their failure in America to the injuries suffered by several players in the first games in Buenos Aires, with Isidro, Luis Pasarín, and himself being forced to stop playing in some games. Even so, he had time to recognize the value of Argentine and Uruguayan football, surprised by the speed with which the forwards developed, and that they were also great kickers. Some players did not return on the "Weser" ship that brought Celta back, including Valderrama, who along with Cárdenes, Espinosa, and Esteban Eguía stopped in the port of Tenerife to spend a few days on vacation. He arrived in Celta not only quite tired from the American tour, but also affected by the minor injuries suffered in the friendlies played on American soil.

After his negative experience on that tour with Celta, he assured that he would renew his contract with Racing Madrid, which he finally ended up doing after his well-deserved vacation in the Canary Islands, but as a result of his travels, he began enjoying a more languid life in "a beach with a palm tree and a seagull". This inevitably led to some problems with the board of Racing due to financial issues and some statements made to the press, so he was disqualified for two years. When Gaspar Rubio left unexpectedly for Havana, Real Madrid found itself without a center forward. Their subsequent efforts in the Royal Spanish Football Federation caused the punishment to be lifted and so he returned to the white team. However, his spell there only lasted a single season once again with Valderrama participating in only two league games of the 1930–31 season, against Athletic Bilbao and Real Sociedad on 22 and 29 March and even scoring once against the former. In total, he played 16 matches for the club. He ended up without a club for the 1931–32 season before being rescued by Atlético Madrid for 1932–33, which at the time was in the Segunda División.

In 1936, Valderrama then moved to AD Ferroviaria, where his career was cut short by a meniscus tear and the Spanish Civil War. In the postwar period, he had a dairy and a billiards and spent a lot of money betting in pools.

== International career ==
Like most Real Madrid players of that time, Valderrama was summoned to play for the Madrid national team, and he was part of the team that reached the final of the 1923–24 Prince of Asturias Cup, an inter-regional competition organized by the RFEF, although he only played in the quarter-finals against Galicia, which his side won 1–0 thanks to an early goal from Antonio De Miguel.

Valderrama earned one international cap for both the Spanish A team and for the B side, both in 1927. His cap for the main side was held at El Sardinero on 17 April 1927, in a friendly against Switzerland which ended in a 1–0 win, courtesy of a goal from Óscar. On the other hand, his cap for the B side was held at the Metropolitano on 29 May 1927, in a friendly against the Portugal A side, and Valderrama scored in a 2-0 win.

== Managerial career ==
After he retired in the mid-1930s, Valderrama became a manager, taking charge over the likes of Cádiz CF and Granada CF in the 1940s.

== Personal life ==
Valderrama was an adventurer, a guy who liked to travel and learn about other cultures. On an exhibition trip to Mexico and the United States, he met Spaniards working in Hollywood, dubbing and re-filming films in Spanish, such as Edgar Neville and Dolores del Río, and decided to stay for a while. There he became friends with people like Stan Lauren and Oliver Hardy.

The date of his death is unknown, but he died at some point in the 1980s.

== Honours ==
=== Club ===
Real Madrid

- Campeonato Regional Centro:
  - Champions (1): 1923–24
- Copa del Rey:
  - Runner-up (1): 1924

=== International ===
Madrid XI

Prince of Asturias Cup:

- Runner-up (1): 1923–24
