= 1925 Copa del Rey final =

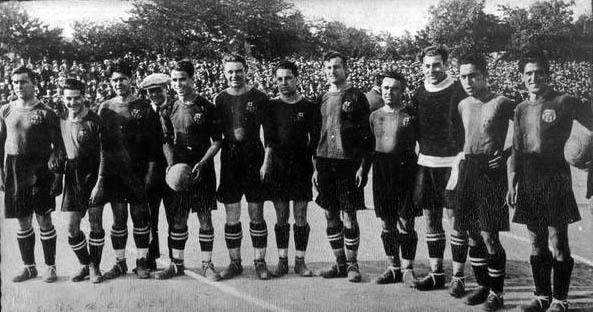
- Team of FC Barcelona, winner
- Event: 1925 Copa del Rey
Barcelona	Arenas
2	0
- Date: May 10, 1925
- Venue: Reina Victoria, Seville
- Referee: Tomás Balaguer

The 1925 Copa del Rey final was the 25th final of the Spanish cup competition, the Copa del Rey. The final was played at Reina Victoria, in Seville, on May 10, 1925. Barcelona beat Arenas 2–0 to win their sixth title.

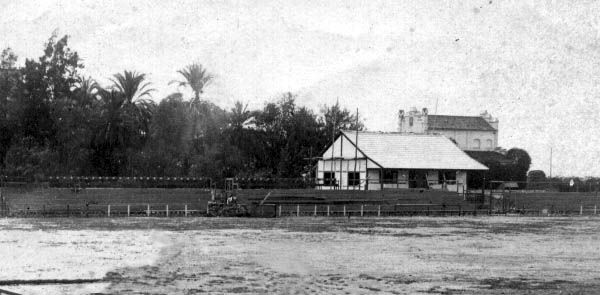
Campo de la Reina Victoria in Seville, venue

== Match details ==
10 May 1925
16:45 CET

Barcelona	2–0	Arenas
Samitier 9'; Sancho 34'

Reina Victoria, Seville
Attendance: 6,000
Referee: Tomás Balaguer

Barcelona	Arenas

GK	1	(Hungary) Ferenc Plattkó
DF	2	(Spain) José Planas Artés
DF	3	(Germany) Emilio Walter
MF	4	(Spain) Ramón Torralba
MF	5	(Spain) Agustín Sancho
MF	6	(Spain) Domingo Carulla
FW	7	(Spain) Vicente Piera
FW	8	(Spain) Arnau
FW	9	(Spain) Josep Samitier
FW	10	(Spain) Paulino Alcántara
FW	11	(Spain) Emilio Sagi-Barba
Manager:
(England) Conyers Kirby

GK	1	(Spain) José María Jáuregui
DF	2	(Spain) Pedro Vallana
DF	3	(Spain) Domingo Careaga
MF	4	(Spain) José Urresti
MF	5	(Spain) Antonio Laña
MF	6	(Spain) José María Peña
FW	7	(Spain) Javier Rivero
FW	8	(Spain) Mateo Aguirregoitia
FW	9	(Spain) José María Yermo
FW	10	(Spain) Fidel Sesúmaga
FW	11	(Spain) Robustiano Bilbao

1925 Copa del Rey winners
Barcelona
6th title
