= Alberto Villaverde (footballer) =

Spanish footballer

Personal information
- Full name: Alberto Villaverde Llanos
- Date of birth: 7 July 1904
- Place of birth: León, Spain
- Date of death: 14 January 1969 (aged 64)
- Position: Midfielder

Senior career*
Years	Team	Apps	(Gls)
1925–1933	Real Unión		

International career
1928	Spain	0	(0)
- * Club domestic league appearances and goals

Alberto Villaverde Llanos (Note: In this Spanish name, the first or paternal surname is Villaverde and the second or maternal family name is Llanos.) (7 July 1904 – 14 January 1969) was a Spanish footballer who played as a midfielder for Real Unión. He was a member of the Spanish football squad that competed in the 1928 Summer Olympics in Amsterdam, but he is best known for being the first-ever player from León to play in La Liga.

== Biography ==
Although he was born on 7 July 1904 in León, Villaverde spent his entire career in Irun, joining the ranks of Real Unión in 1925 and playing with them for eight years until 1933. He helped his side win the Gipuzkoa Championship four times, 1925–26, 1927–28, 1929–30, and 1930–31, along with the 1927 Copa del Rey, starting in the final against Arenas Club de Getxo, which ended in a 1–0 victory, courtesy of an extra-time goal from José Echeveste.

In 1929, Villaverde played in the inaugural season of La Liga, and in doing so, he became the first-ever player from León to play matches in the Spanish top division. Of the 18 games that Union played, the Leonese featured in 13 of them, and although he failed to score, he did so in the next one and then in the last season in which he defended the colors of Union. It would take a full decade for another footballer from León to play in La Liga, César Rodríguez, who made his debut for Granada CF in 1939.

Villaverde was a member of the Spanish football squad that competed in the 1928 Summer Olympics in Amsterdam, but he did not play in any matches. In total, he was called up for the national team 3 times, but was unable to make his debut.

== Honours ==
Real Unión

- Copa del Rey:
  - Champions: 1927
- Gipuzkoa Championship:
  - Champions (5): 1925–26, 1927–28, 1929–30, and 1930–31
