= Xabier Otermin =

Spanish footballer

Xabi Otermin
Personal information
- Full name: Xabier Otermin Jiménez
- Date of birth: 31 August 1977 (age 49)
- Place of birth: Zarautz, Spain
- Height: 1.81 m (5 ft 11 in)
- Position: Goalkeeper

Youth career
- Zarautz
- Real Sociedad

Senior career*
Years	Team	Apps	(Gls)
1997–2000	Real Sociedad B		
2000–2003	Real Unión	93	(0)
2003–2004	Girona	35	(0)
2004–2015	Real Unión	323	(0)
Total		451	(0)
- * Club domestic league appearances and goals

Xabier 'Xabi' Otermin Jiménez (born 31 August 1977) is a Spanish former professional footballer who played as a goalkeeper.

== Club career ==
Born in Zarautz, Gipuzkoa, Basque Country, Otermin finished his youth career with Real Sociedad, and made his senior debut with the reserves in the 1997–98 season, in the Segunda División B. In the summer of 2000, he signed with neighbouring Real Unión also in the third division.

In July 2003, having been deemed surplus to requirements by manager Miguel Sola, Otermin cut ties with the club and joined Girona in the same tier. He eventually returned to Real Unión and played 29 matches during the 2008–09 campaign, which ended in promotion.

On 19 December 2009, aged 32, Otermin appeared in his first game as a professional, in a 1–0 Segunda División away loss against Numancia. He acted mainly as a backup to Javier Jauregui during the season, as his team was eventually relegated.

Otermin made his 400th competitive appearance for Unión on 12 October 2013, when he started in a 2–0 home win over Atlético Madrid B.
