= Javier Jáuregui =

Javier Jáuregui or Jauregui can refer to:

- Javier Jáuregui (boxer) (1973-2013), Mexican boxer
- Javier Jauregui (footballer) (born 1975), Spanish footballer
