= Pedro Vallana =

Spanish footballer (1897-1980)

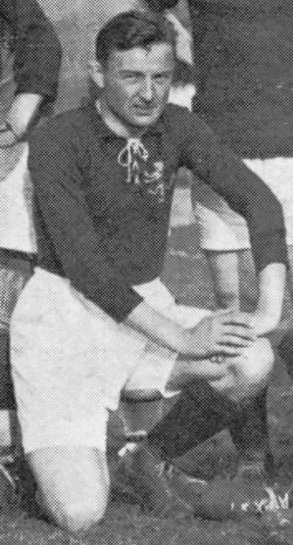
- Vallana in 1920

Personal information
- Full name: Pedro Vicente Saturnino Vallana Jeanguenat
- Date of birth: 29 November 1897
- Place of birth: Getxo, Basque Country, Spain
- Date of death: 4 July 1980 (aged 82)
- Place of death: Montevideo, Uruguay
- Height: 1.73 m (5 ft 8 in)
- Position: Midfielder

Senior career*
| Years | Team | Apps | (Gls) |
| 1916–1928 | Arenas Club de Getxo | | |

International career
| 1920–1923 | Spain | 3 | (0) |
| 1922–1924 | Biscay | +4 | (0) |

Managerial career
- 1928–1930: Arenas Club de Getxo
- 1936–1937: Basque Country national team
Medal record
Men's football
Representing (Spain)
Olympic Games
| Silver medal – second place | 1920 Antwerp | Team competition |
- * Club domestic league appearances and goals

Pedro Vicente Saturnino Vallana Jeanguenat (29 November 1897 – 4 July 1980) was a Spanish footballer, referee and manager in Spain in the 1920s. He was of Italian and Swiss descent. He spent all 12 seasons of his playing career with Arenas de Getxo, during the club's golden age, thus being a historical player of the club and part of the so-called one-club men group. He was a member of the Spain national team which won the silver medal in the football tournament of the 1920 Summer Olympics in Antwerp. He participated in a further two Olympic Games (1924 and 1928) for a total of three, a record that no other Spanish footballer has broken. Once retired, he was a prestigious referee in Spain in La Liga and during the Spanish Civil War, he coached the Basque Country national team, a fact that led to his exile in Uruguay after the war, living there until his death in 1980.

== Club career ==
Vallana was born in Getxo to an Italian father who worked as a machinist in Bilbao, and a Swiss mother. He was loyal to his hometown club in his entire career as a footballer, the Arenas Club de Getxo, which he arrived in 1912, three years after its founding, while still a teenager and where he remained until his retirement 17 years later in 1929. In his first year Arenas in 1912, at only 15 years old, he combined playing football with work as a secretary. First, as a midfielder, and later as a defender, he formed a historic defensive partnership with Domingo Careaga, another man from Getxo like himself, with whom he shared the team's defense for many years. Together with Careaga, he was one of the main architects of the team's football power in the Basque Country, competing head-to-head against the likes of Athletic Club and Real Unión, being crucial in the club's five Biscay Championships in 1916–17, 1918–19, 1921–22, 1924–25 and 1926–27, and he also was pivotal in helping Arenas reach four Copa del Rey finals (1917, 1919, 1925, and 1927), only missed the one in 1927 and only winning the one in 1919, which still stands as the only Copa del Rey title in the club's history. The highlight of his club career was helping Arenas win the 1919 Copa del Rey after defeating the powerful FC Barcelona by a score of 5–2.

He stood out for his great speed, which he used to help him easily snatch the ball from the opponent. As a talented sprinter, he achieved a silver medal in the 200 metres event and a bronze in the long jump at the 1918 edition of the Spanish Athletics Championships. He was also a good athlete, who practiced athletics in parallel with his career as a footballer, and in fact, he held the Vizcaya record for the 100 metres dash between 1922 and 1928. He also practiced mountaineering, cycling, and swimming. He was an athlete with capital letters. The RFEF awarded him the gold medal for sporting merit.

In 1928 he was one of the members of the Arenas de Getxo team that played in the first-ever season of the Spanish Football League. However, he was already an aged player, and only got to play one game with Arenas in the First Division, on the second day of the 1929 La Liga season, at the CE Europa stadium in Barcelona.

== International career ==
He earned 12 caps for Spain between 1920 and 1928, half of which in Olympic football tournaments. In the 1920 Summer Olympics, he did not play in the first game of the tournament against Denmark, which marked the historic debut of the Spain national team, but he then featured in all of the remaining four matches against Belgium, Sweden, Italy, and the Netherlands, contributing decisively to help Spain win the silver medal. His other two caps in the Olympics came in the 1924 and 1928 editions, which is a record since no other Spanish player has been in three Olympic events. However, except for the 1920 silver medal, his Olympic appearances were not favored by fortune. In 1924 he netted an own goal past Ricardo Zamora with 12 minutes to go, which led to the elimination of the Spanish team from the tournament in the preliminary round in a 0–1 loss to Italy. In 1928 he was injured in the first game against Mexico, which was to be his last for the national team.

Like many other Arenas de Getxo players of that time, he played a few games for the Biscay national team, participating in both the 1922–23 and the 1923–24 Prince of Asturias Cups, an official inter-regional competition organized by the RFEF. Both campaigns ended in narrow defeats to Asturias (3–4) and Catalonia (0–1).

== Refereeing career ==
In 1928, when still a player, he began his career as a referee, making his debut in the Spanish First Division that same season. Thus, Vallana holds the peculiar distinction of being one of the few to have participated in the same La Liga season both as a player and as a referee. He belonged to the Colegio Vizcaíno, of which he ended up being president. Apart from three sporadic appearances in 1922 in the Copa del Rey, he whistled in the cup uninterruptedly from 1928 until 1936. In his first season as a referee, he oversaw his first and only final, the 1928 Copa del Rey Final between FC Barcelona and Real Sociedad, a final that needed 3 matches to decide the winners as the first two ended in 1–1 draws, and Vallana refereed the first of them. Barcelona won in the end with a 3–1 victory in the third match. His career in the world of refereeing in Spain lasted until 1936. Vallana refereed 33 matches in the First Division during those years.

== Sports journalist ==
He later reported on the Olympics as a sports journalist for the newspaper El Mundo Deportivo. He also acted as a sports commentator in the Bilbao sports newspaper Excelsior. In 1933 Vallana wrote in the sports magazine Campeón a memory of fellow Spanish legend, rival, and companion, Rafael Moreno, better known as Pichichi, called Pichichi inenarrable.

== Managerial career ==
In 1936 the outbreak of the Spanish Civil War temporarily put an end to sports competitions in Spain. At the beginning of 1937, the Basque Government arranged for the Basque Country national team to make a tour in Europe and play friendly matches, in order to raise funds in Europe for Basque refugees and carry out propaganda work in favor of the Basque Government and the Spanish Republic, and Vallana enlisted as the team's coach. After Bilbao fell into Franco's hands, the Basque National Team went to South America to continue the tour. When the economic, political, and sports difficulties overwhelmed this errant team, Vallana decided to abandon it and leave his coaching position when they passed through Argentina, before emigrating to Montevideo, Uruguay, arriving in 1938.

== Death ==
Vallana went into exile in Uruguay in 1938, a country he had known since 1922 when he played a series of friendlies there with a team of Basque players. Vallana brought his wife and daughters from the Basque Country later. In Montevideo, he continued to work as a football referee and a sports journalist and reporter in a newspaper in the Uruguayan capital.

For his exemplary performance, his regularity and his tenacity in defending the colors of Spain, he received the Medal of Sports Merit, awarded by the Spanish Federation.

He died in Montevideo on 4 July 1980, at the age of 83.

== Honours ==
=== Club ===
Arenas Club

- North Championship (5): 1916–17, 1918–19, 1921–22, 1924–25, and 1926–27
- Copa del Rey
  - Champions (1): 1919
  - Runner-up (3): 1917, 1925, 1927

=== International ===
Spain

- Olympic Games Silver medal: 1920
