= Francisco Gamborena =

Spanish footballer

Patxi Gamborena
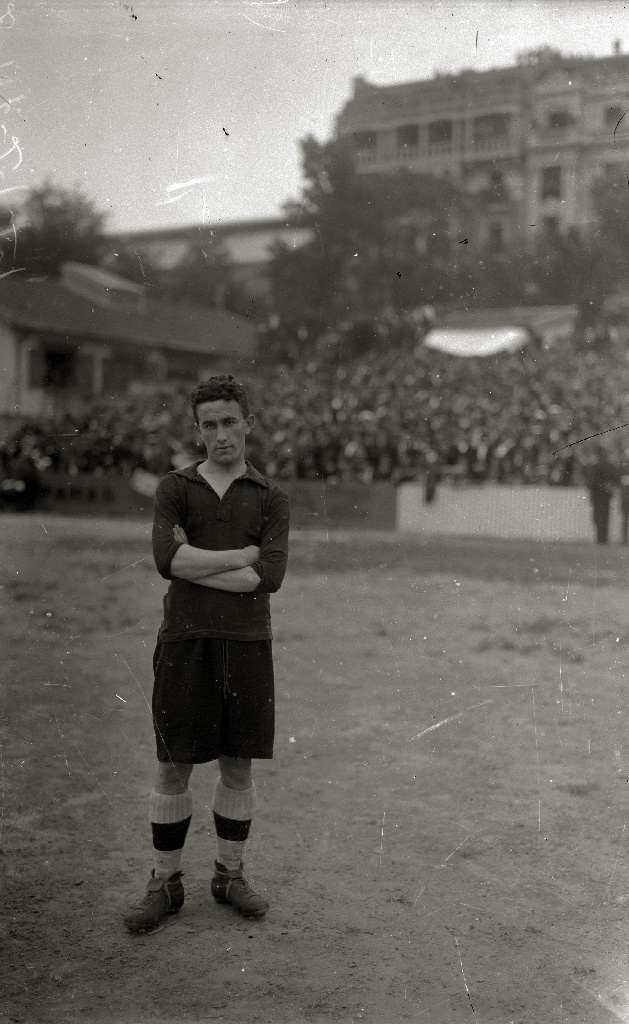
- Gamborena after winning the 1924 Copa del Rey Final with Real Unión

Personal information
- Full name: Francisco Gamborena Hernandorena
- Date of birth: 14 March 1901
- Place of birth: Irún, Spain
- Date of death: 30 July 1982 (aged 81)
- Place of death: San Sebastián, Spain
- Position: Midfielder

Senior career*
Years	Team	Apps	(Gls)
1915–1934	Real Unión	92	(4)

International career
1921–1933	Spain	20	(0)

Managerial career
- 1939: Hércules
- 1940–1941: Alavés
- 1941: Zaragoza
- 1941–1942: Real Sociedad
- 1943–1944: Atlético Tetuán
- 1944–1946: Xerez
- 1947–1948: Oviedo
- 1949–1950: Jaén
- * Club domestic league appearances and goals

Francisco "Patxi" Gamborena Hernandorena (14 March 1901 – 30 July 1982), was a Spanish footballer who played as a midfielder.

He spent his entire club career from 1915 to 1934 with Real Unión in his hometown of Irún in the Basque Country, winning the Copa del Rey in 1924 and 1927 before playing in the club's four seasons in La Liga after its formation, followed by two in the Segunda División after relegation (they never returned to the top level).

Gamborena made his international debut for Spain on 9 October 1921 in a 2–0 home friendly win over Belgium in Bilbao's Estadio San Mamés. He played 20 internationals, including at the 1924 and 1928 Olympic tournaments, and his last match was a 13–0 win over Bulgaria on 21 May 1933, Spain's record victory.

After his retirement, he had brief spells in management at six Spanish clubs between 1939 and 1950.

== Honours ==
- Copa del Rey: 1924, 1927
