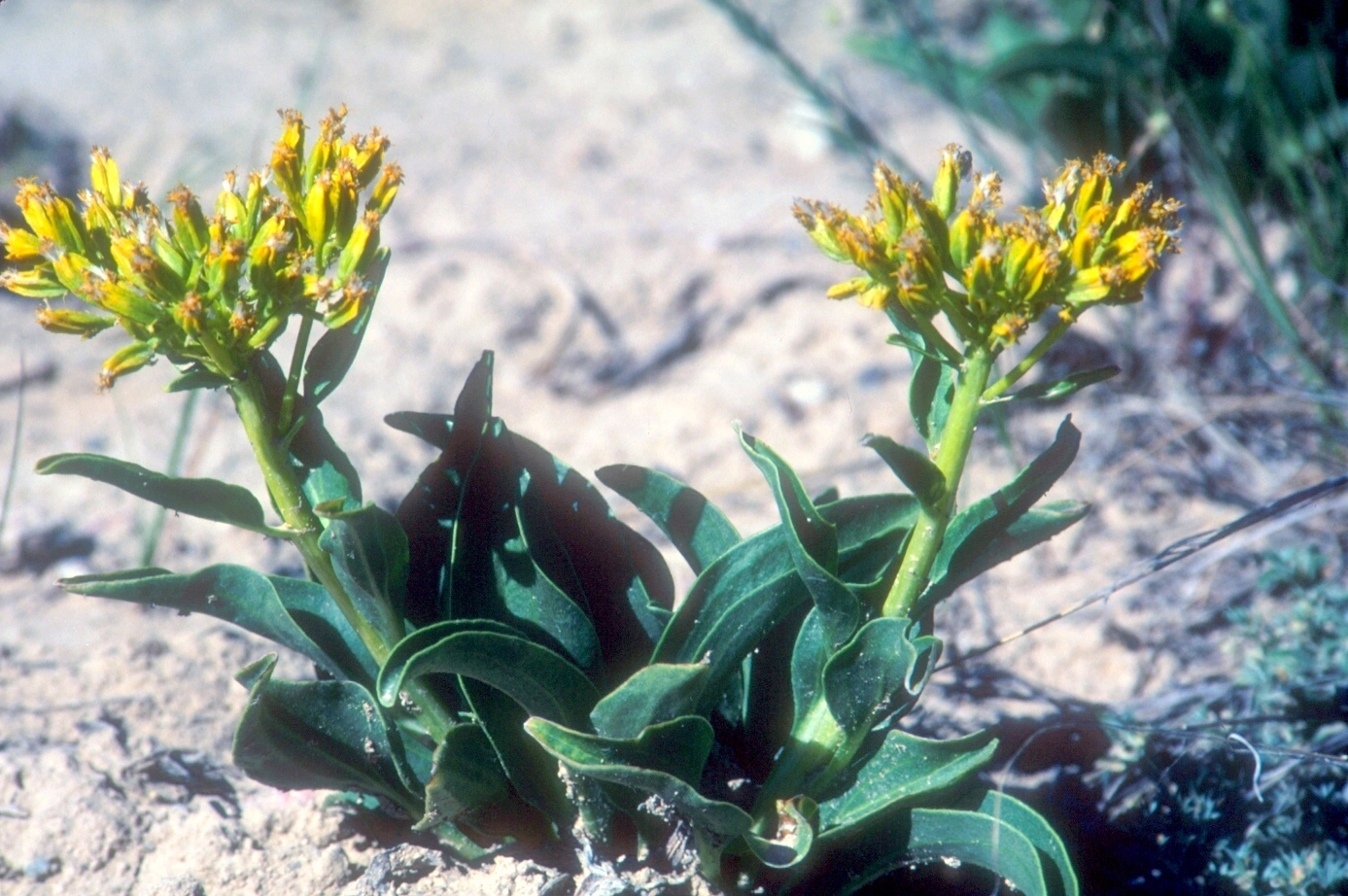

Conservation status
- Threatened (ESA)

Scientific classification
- Kingdom: Plantae
- Clade: Tracheophytes
- Clade: Angiosperms
- Clade: Eudicots
- Clade: Asterids
- Order: Asterales
- Family: Asteraceae
- Subfamily: Asteroideae
- Tribe: Senecioneae
- Genus: Yermo; Dorn
- Species: Y. xanthocephalus

Binomial name
- Yermo xanthocephalus Dorn

= Yermo xanthocephalus =

Species of flowering plant

Yermo xanthocephalus commonly known as the desert yellowhead is an American flowering plant endemic to southern Wyoming. It is the only member of the genus Yermo and was first described in 1991.

== Distribution ==
The desert yellowhead is currently known to exist only in two populations on less than 50 acres (200,000 m^{2}) of Bureau of Land Management land in southern Fremont County, Wyoming. One population contains an estimated 12,000 plants, the other about 400 plants.

== Description ==
Yermo xanthocephalus is a perennial, herbaceous plant growing up to 30 cm (12 in) in height with alternate, leathery leaves. The leaves are lanceolate to obovate, up to 25 cm (9.8 in) in length and 6 cm (2.4 in) in width. The leaves produce a mild numbing sensation in the mouth when ingested.

Numerous flowerheads (25–180) are crowded at the top of the stem. Each composite flower contains four to six yellow disk flowers and no ray flowers. It typically flowers from mid-June to August.

== Conservation ==
The plant has been a federally listed threatened species in the United States since 2002. As of 2018 it is not included in the IUCN Red List.

At the time of its listing, the desert yellowhead was threatened by human activities, including potential oil and gas field development on two leases that encompass the plant's habitat. The two populations were protected from surface disturbance activities related to oil and gas field development in 2005. The habitat is also in the vicinity of mineral resources such as opals, gold, uranium, and zeolites. As of 2012, the U.S. Fish and Wildlife Service considered the threat from oil and gas development and mineral extraction to be "low in severity and magnitude and not an immediate threat to the species".

Other potential threats include recreational off-road vehicle use in the area, and one of the populations has been closed to off-road vehicles. No illegal cross-country vehicular travel has been noted and the threat remains low. Non-native and invasive species such as Hyoscyamus niger (black henbane), Cardaria spp. (whitetops), and Centaurea repens (Russian knapweed) are in the vicinity and may post a threat to the populations in the future. The threat of oversampling for education and research as well as livestock and wild ungulate grazing and trampling were considered to be low in severity. Because of the desert yellowhead's small population and limited geographic range, even small-scale habitat degradation could make it vulnerable to extinction.
