= Javier Jauregui (footballer) =

Spanish footballer

Personal information
- Full name: Javier Jauregui Blanco
- Date of birth: 29 January 1975 (age 51)
- Place of birth: Tolosa, Spain
- Height: 1.86 m (6 ft 1 in)
- Position: Goalkeeper

Youth career
- 1991–1993: Tolosa

Senior career*
Years	Team	Apps	(Gls)
1993–1997	Logroñés B	47	(0)
1994–1999	Logroñés	1	(0)
1994–1995	→ River Ebro (loan)		
1997–1998	→ Beasain (loan)	37	(0)
1999–2000	Racing Ferrol	38	(0)
2000–2001	Eibar	40	(0)
2001–2005	Córdoba	135	(0)
2005–2008	Lorca Deportiva	107	(0)
2008–2010	Real Unión	33	(0)
2010–2011	Beasain		
Total		438	(0)
- * Club domestic league appearances and goals

Javier Jauregui Blanco (born 29 January 1975) is a Spanish former professional footballer who played as a goalkeeper.

== Club career ==
Born in Tolosa, Gipuzkoa, Jauregui appeared in 277 Segunda División games over eight seasons, representing in the competition Eibar, Córdoba, Lorca Deportiva and Real Unión. On 22 June 1997, while in service of Logroñés, he played his only La Liga match, a 2–1 away loss against Real Sociedad.

Jauregui retired in June 2011 at the age of 36, after one season with Tercera División club Beasain in his native Basque Country.
