= Iker Gabarain =

Spanish footballer

Personal information
- Full name: Iker Gabarain González
- Date of birth: 21 May 1977 (age 49)
- Place of birth: Tolosa, Spain
- Height: 1.71 m (5 ft 7 1/2 in)
- Position: Left back

Senior career*
Years	Team	Apps	(Gls)
1996–1997	Tolosa		
1997–1999	Beasain	46	(2)
1999–2001	Alavés B	61	(0)
2001–2005	Amurrio	112	(6)
2005–2013	Real Unión	213	(1)
2013–2014	Beasain	?	(0)
- * Club domestic league appearances and goals

Iker Gabarain González (born 21 May 1977) is a Spanish retired footballer who played as a left back.Nowadays he works in Ederfil Becker.
