= Urruticoechea =

Urruticoechea is a surname. Notable people with the surname include:

- Cristóbal Urruticoechea (born 1975), Chilean politician
- Javier Urruticoechea (1952–2001), Spanish footballer
