= Campo de Ciudad Lineal =

Multi-use stadium in Madrid, Spain

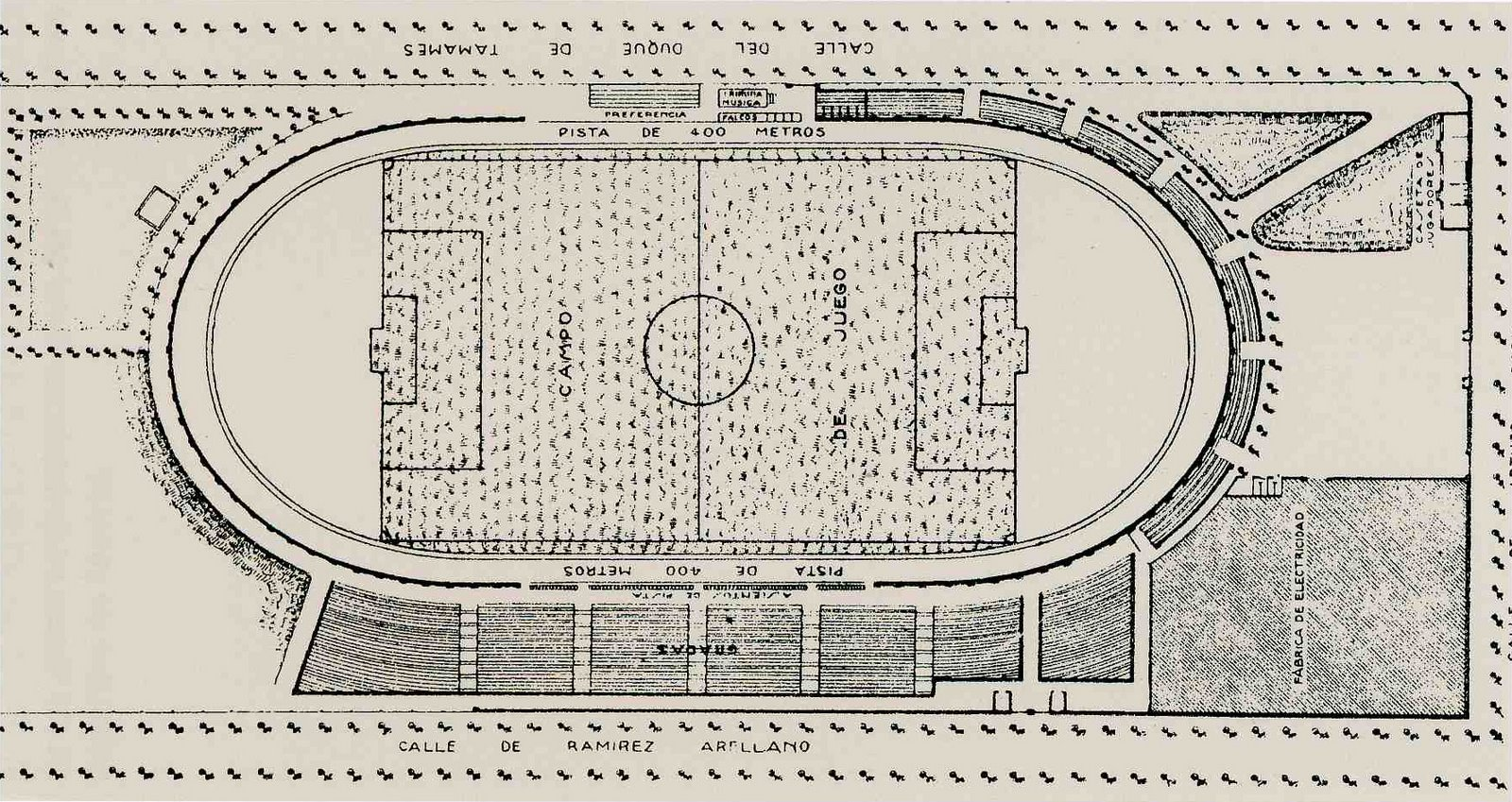
- Interactive map of Campo de Ciudad Lineal
- Full name: Campo de Ciudad Lineal
- Location: Madrid, Spain
- Coordinates: 40.4501°N 3.6532°W
- Capacity: 8,000

Construction
- Opened: (for cycling) 3 July 1910 (for football) 29 April 1923
- Closed: (for football) 1972

Tenants
- Real Madrid CF (1923–1924); AD Plus Ultra (1931–1972)

Campo de Ciudad Lineal was a multi-use stadium in Madrid, Spain. It was developed as part of Ciudad Lineal, a district of Madrid built according to a distinctive model of urban planning.

The capacity of the stadium was 8,000 spectators. It is perhaps best known for having served as the stadium of Real Madrid in the early 1920s before being replaced by Estadio Chamartín in 1924.
