= 1924 Copa del Rey =

1924 King Alfonso XIII's Cup
24th Copa del Rey

Tournament details
- Country: Spain
- Teams: 10

Final positions
- Champions: Real Unión (2nd title)
- Runners-up: Real Madrid

Tournament statistics
- Matches played: 20
- Goals scored: 79 (3.95 per match)

Awards
- Best player: Paulino Alcántara (9 goals)

The King Alfonso XIII's Cup 1924 was the 24th staging of the Copa del Rey, the Spanish football cup competition.

The competition started on 23 March 1924, and concluded on May 4, 1924, with the final, held at the Estadio de Atotxa in San Sebastián, in which Real Unión lifted the trophy for the second time (third time counting the trophy won by Racing de Irun in 1913) with a 1–0 victory over Real Madrid with José Echeveste netting the only goal of the match.

== Teams ==
- Biscay: Athletic Bilbao
- Gipuzkoa: Real Unión
- Centre Region: Real Madrid
- South Region: Sevilla FC
- Galicia: Celta de Vigo
- Asturias: Sporting de Gijón
- Cantabria: Racing de Santander
- Catalonia: FC Barcelona
- Aragón: Stadium de Zaragoza
- Levante: Natación de Alicante

== Preliminary round ==
=== First leg ===
23 March 1924

FC Barcelona	8–1	RSA Stadium de Zaragoza
Sagibarba 20', 25' (pen.); Alcántara 40', 46', 55', 58'; Samitier 78', 85'	Report	Buylla 8'

Camp de Les Corts, Barcelona
Referee: Antonio De Cárcer
23 March 1924

Sporting Gijón	7–0	Racing Santander
Arcadio 19'; Morilla 30', 51', 60', 70'; Argüelles 54', 80'	Report

El Molinón, Gijón
Referee: Fernando Gutiérrez

=== Second leg ===
30 March 1924

RSA Stadium de Zaragoza	0–9	FC Barcelona
	Report	Gràcia 22', 48'; Sagibarba 40' (pen.), 82' (pen.); Alcántara 65', 68', 72'; Samitier 30', 60'

Arrabal, Zaragoza
Referee: Juan Sánchez Malo

Barcelona qualified for the quarter-finals 1–17 on agg.

30 March 1924

Racing Santander	2–3	Sporting Gijón
Óscar 25', 82'	Report	Arcadio 43'; Morilla 50', 75'

El Sardinero Santander
Referee: Fernando Gutiérrez

Sporting Gijón qualified for the quarter-finals 2–10 on agg.

== Quarterfinals ==
=== First leg ===
23 March 1924

Real Madrid	4–0	Natacion
Quesada 10' (pen.); Monjardín 20', 30'; Valderrama 40'	Report

Ciudad Lineal, Madrid
Referee: Pelayo Serrano
23 March 1924

Sevilla FC	1–1	Real Unión
Kinké 34'	Report	Matías 33'

Campo de la Reina Victoria, Sevilla
Referee: Josep Llovera
23 March 1924

Celta Vigo	1–1	Athletic Bilbao
Posada 25'	Report	Carmelo 48'

Campo de Coia, Vigo
Referee: Federico Larrañaga
6 April 1924

FC Barcelona	2–0	Sporting Gijón
Alcántara 49'; Carulla 58'	Report

Camp de Les Corts, Barcelona
Referee: Balaguer García

=== Second leg ===
30 March 1924

Natacion	2–3	Real Madrid
Ramonzuelo 10', 50'	Report	Valderrama 20'; Monjardín 30', 40'

Alicante
Referee: Balaguer García

Real Madrid qualified for the semifinals 7–2 on agg.

23 March 1924

Real Unión	2–0	Sevilla FC
Errazquin 29'; Matías 83'	Report

Gal, Irun
Referee: Agustín Cruella Tena

Real Unión qualified for the semifinals 3–1 on agg.

23 March 1924

Athletic Bilbao	6–1	Celta Vigo
Larrakoetxea 24', 44', 70'; Laca 61', 85', 90'	Report	Polo 8'

San Mamés Stadium, Bilbao
Referee: Villaverde Fernández

Athletic Bilbao qualified for the semifinals 7–2 on agg.

13 April 1924

Sporting Gijón	2–0	FC Barcelona
Arcadio 65', 82'	Report

El Molinón, Gijón
Referee: Francisco Contreras

=== Tie break ===
16 April 1924

FC Barcelona	3–1	Sporting Gijón
Piera 38' (pen.); Gràcia 39', 62'	Report	Arcadio 35' (pen.)

Estadio Metropolitano, Madrid
Referee: Luis Colina

Barcelona qualified for the semifinals 5–3 on agg.

== Semifinals ==
=== First leg ===
6 April 1924

Athletic Bilbao	3–1	Real Madrid
Larrakoetxea 10', 30'; Carmelo 70'	Report	Bernabéu 40'

San Mamés Stadium, Bilbao
Referee: Agustín Cruella Tena
20 April 1924

Real Unión	1–0	FC Barcelona
Vázquez 16'	Report

Gal, Irún
Referee: Fermín Sánchez

=== Second leg ===
13 April 1924

Real Madrid	3–0	Athletic Bilbao
Valderrama 36'; Monjardín 45'; Pérez 61'	Report

Estadio Metropolitano, Madrid
Referee: Agustín Cruella Tena
27 April 1924

FC Barcelona	2–0	Real Unión
Piera 27'; Alcántara 80'	Report

Camp de Les Corts, Barcelona
Referee: Antonio Adrados

=== Tie Break ===
15 April 1924

Real Madrid	1–0	Athletic Bilbao
Monjardín 74'	Report

Estadio Metropolitano, Madrid
Referee: Balaguer García

Madrid qualified for the final 5–3 on agg.

30 April 1924

Real Unión	6–1	FC Barcelona
Vázquez 21', 38'; Errazquin 30', 46'; René Petit 67'; Matías 85'	Report	Martí 60'

Atotxa, San Sebastián
Referee: Fermín Sánchez

Unión qualified for the final 7–3 on agg.

== Final ==
4 May 1924

Real Unión	1–0	Real Madrid
Echeveste 58'	Report

Atotxa, San Sebastián
Referee: Fermín Sánchez
