= Juanín (footballer, born 1900) =

Spanish footballer

Personal information
- Full name: Juan Bilbao Mintegi
- Date of birth: 5 September 1900
- Place of birth: Bilbao, Spain
- Date of death: 28 October 1972 (aged 72)
- Position: Defender

Senior career*
Years	Team	Apps	(Gls)
1922–1925	Osasuna		
1925	Athletic Bilbao		
1925–1926	Osasuna		
1926–1931	Athletic Bilbao	14	(1)
Total		14	(1)

International career
1925–1927	Spain	2	(0)
- * Club domestic league appearances and goals

Juan Bilbao Mintegi, known as Juanín (5 September 1900 – 28 October 1972) was a Spanish professional footballer who played as a defender.

== Career ==
Born in Bilbao, Juanín played for Osasuna and Athletic Bilbao, and was capped twice for Spain.
