= Juan Errazquin =

Spanish footballer (1906–1931)

Personal information
- Full name: Juan Errazquin Tomás
- Date of birth: 22 June 1906
- Place of birth: Leones, Argentina
- Date of death: 13 January 1931 (aged 24)
- Place of death: Irun, Spain
- Position: Forward

Youth career
- Real Unión

Senior career*
Years	Team	Apps	(Gls)
1921–1923	Real Unión B		
1923–1928	Real Unión		

International career
1925–1928	Spain	6	(6)
- * Club domestic league appearances and goals

Juan Errazquin Tomás (22 June 1906 – 13 January 1931) was a Spanish footballer who played as a forward.

== Club career ==
Born in Leones, Argentina to Basque parents, Errazquin moved to the Basque town of Irun as a child. In 1921, Errazquin made his debut for Real Unión B, at the age of 15, before working his way up to Real Unión's first team by 1923, starting in Real Unión's 1924 Copa del Rey Final win at the age of 17.

== International career ==
On 1 June 1925, Errazquin made his debut for Spain in a 3–0 win against Switzerland, scoring all three goals. At the age of 18 and 344 days, Errazquin became the youngest goalscorer in Spain's history, until Ansu Fati's goal against Ukraine on 6 September 2020 at the age of 17 years and 311 days broke Errazquin's 95-year-old record.

=== International goals ===
Scores and results list Spain's goal tally first.

No.	Date	Venue	Opponent	Score	Result	Competition
1	1 June 1925	Stadion Neufeld, Bern, Switzerland	Switzerland	2–0	3–0	Friendly
2	1 June 1925	Stadion Neufeld, Bern, Switzerland	Switzerland	2–0	3–0	Friendly
3	1 June 1925	Stadion Neufeld, Bern, Switzerland	Switzerland	3–0	3–0	Friendly
4	14 June 1925	Mestalla, Valencia, Spain	Italy	1–0	1–0	Friendly
5	19 December 1926	Campo de Coia, Vigo, Spain	Hungary	1–0	4–2	Friendly
6	19 December 1926	Campo de Coia, Vigo, Spain	Hungary	4–2	4–2	Friendly

== Death ==
On 6 January 1931, Errazquin died at the age of 24 following, what Mundo Deportivo described as, a "cruel disease".
