= Juan Pablo Barrero =

Spanish footballer and lawyer (1900–1966)

Personal information
- Full name: Juan Pablo Barrero del Noval
- Date of birth: 27 February 1900
- Place of birth: Sevilla, Spain
- Date of death: 14 January 1966 (aged 65)
- Place of death: Spain
- Position: Midfielder

Senior career*
Years	Team	Apps	(Gls)
1921–1922	Sevilla		
1923–1925	Real Madrid		
- * Club domestic league appearances and goals

Juan Pablo Barrero del Noval (27 February 1900 – 14 January 1966) was a Spanish footballer who played as a midfielder for Sevilla and Real Madrid in the early 1920s.

== Career ==
Born on 27 February 1900 in Sevilla, (Note: Some sources wrongly state that he was born on 27 February 1901.) Barrero began his career at his hometown club Sevilla in the early 1920s. He played only one official match for Sevilla, the opening match of the 1921–22 Andalusian Championship on 13 November, which ended in a 3–1 loss to city rivals Real Betis; nevertheless, the local press praised him, stating that he had "worked beyond words". On one occasion, he played for Haro Deportivo in a friendly match against Deportivo Alavés, thus becoming Alavés' first-ever Sevilla opponent.

Two years later, in 1923, Barrero joined Real Madrid, where he stayed for two years, until 1925, playing a total of 15 official matches, including five in the Copa del Rey and ten in the Centro Regional Championship, which he won in 1924.

== Professional career ==
Barrero graduated in law from the University of Seville, which he attended in the late 1910s and 1920s. He eventually became a Doctor of Law, Philosophy and Letters, lawyer, and notary of the College of Seville. In February 1961, Barrero, then a notary of the College of Madrid, authorized two copies of minutes regarding the auction of construction works, the first about twelve homes for Teachers in Huércal-Overa, and the other about six schools and six homes for teachers in Bélmez de la Moraleda.

== Death ==
Barrero died on 14 January 1966, at the age of 65.

== Honours ==
Real Madrid

- Centro Championship
  - Champions (1): 1923–24
