= José Echeveste =

Spanish footballer (1899–1982)

Personal information
- Full name: José Echeveste Galfarsoro
- Date of birth: 19 March 1899
- Place of birth: Irún, Spain
- Date of death: 7 December 1982 (aged 83)
- Place of death: Irun, Spain
- Position: Forward

Youth career
- Hispania
- –1915: Irún Sporting
- 1915–1919: Real Unión

Senior career*
Years	Team	Apps	(Gls)
1919–1932	Real Unión		

International career
1922–1927	Spain	4	(0)
- * Club domestic league appearances and goals

José Echeveste Galfarsoro (19 March 1899 – 7 December 1982) was a Spanish footballer who played as a forward for Real Unión and the Spanish national team in the 1920s.

He spent all 13 seasons of his playing career with Real Unión, thus being a historical member of the club and part of the so-called one-club men group, playing a pivotal role in the Unión team that won two Copa del Rey in the 1920s, in 1924 and 1927, netting the winning goals in both finals.

== Club career ==
Born in the Gipuzkoan town of Irun on 19 March 1899, (Note: Some sources wrongly claim that he was born on 19 May 1899.) Echeveste began his career in the youth ranks of Hispania, from which he joined the youth team of Irún Sporting, then presided by his father, staying there until 1915, when Irún Sporting merged with its city rival Racing to form Real Unión.

Echeveste made his debut with the first team of Real Unión in 1919, aged 20, with whom he spent his entire 13-year career, until his retirement in 1932. Together with René Petit and Luis Regueiro, he played a fundamental role in the team that won two Copa del Rey titles in the 1920s, netting the winning goal in both finals to help his side to 1–0 victories over Real Madrid in 1924 and Arenas de Getxo in 1927. In the same way, and being the tournament that gave access to the national cup, he won a total of three Biscay Championships.

On 5 August 1928, Echeveste played for FC Barcelona in an unofficial match against Argentina, which ended in a goalless draw. The following year, he played seven games in the inaugural season of La Liga in 1929. In total, he scored 3 goals in 8 La Liga matches.

== International career ==
Echeveste earned four international caps for the Spain national team, making his debut in a friendly against France on 30 April 1922, helping his side to a comfortable 4–0 win. He then had to wait three years for his next cap on 1 June 1925, against Switzerland, in another comfortable win (3–0). His last two caps were both friendlies against Italy, the latter in March 1927.

After briefly working in the family customs agency, Echeveste moved to Banco Guipuzcoano in 1924. That same year, he was selected for the Spanish squad that competed in the football tournament of the 1924 Olympic Games, but he ultimately did not travel to Paris because he could not get permission from the bank where he worked. He was also called-up for the 1928 Olympic Games in Amsterdam.

== Death ==
Echeveste died in Irún on 7 December 1982, at the age of 83.

== Honours ==
Real Unión

- North Regional Championship: 1921–22, 1923–24, 1926–27
- Copa del Rey: 1924, 1927; runner-up 1922
