= Manuel Sagarzazu =

Spanish footballer

Personal information
- Date of birth: 15 October 1903
- Place of birth: Hondarribia
- Date of death: 25 July 1990 (aged 86)

International career
Years	Team	Apps	(Gls)
1927	Spain	2	(0)

Manuel Sagarzazu (15 October 1903 – 25 July 1990) was a Spanish footballer. He played in two matches for the Spain national football team in 1927.
