= Robustiano Bilbao =

Spanish footballer

Personal information
- Full name: Robustiano Bilbao Echevarría
- Date of birth: 29 November 1897
- Place of birth: Neguri, Spain

International career
Years	Team	Apps	(Gls)
- Spain

Robustiano Bilbao Echevarría (born 29 November 1897, date of death unknown) was a Spanish footballer. He competed in the men's tournament at the 1928 Summer Olympics.
