= Ramón Eguiazábal =

Spanish footballer

Medal record

Men's football

Representing Spain

Olympic Games
| Silver medal – second place | 1920 Antwerp | Team competition |

Ramón Eguiazábal Berroa (14 April 1896 – 1939) was a Spanish association football player who competed in the 1920 Summer Olympics. He was born in Irun. He was a member of the Spanish team, which won the silver medal in the football tournament.
