= José María Jáuregui =

Spanish footballer

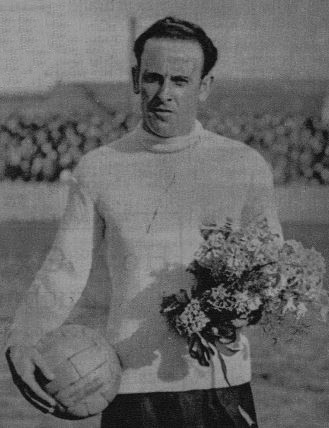

Personal information
- Full name: José María Jáuregui Lagunas
- Date of birth: 15 March 1896
- Place of birth: Las Arenas, Spain
- Date of death: 3 May 1988 (aged 92)
- Height: 1.71 m (5 ft 7 1/2 in)
- Position: Goalkeeper

Senior career*
Years	Team	Apps	(Gls)
1917–1931	Arenas	15	(0)

International career
1928	Spain	3	(0)
- * Club domestic league appearances and goals

José María Jáuregui Lagunas (15 March 1896 – 3 May 1988) was a Spanish footballer. He competed in the men's tournament at the 1928 Summer Olympics.
