= Real Unión =

Spanish football club

- Full name: Real Unión Club, S.A.D.
- Nickname: Txuri-beltz (White-black)
- Founded: 15 May 1915; 111 years ago
- Stadium: Stadium Gal
- Capacity: 5,000
- Owner(s): Unai Emery (75%); V Sports (25%)
- President: Igor Emery
- Head coach: Ramsés Gil
- League: Primera Federación – Group 1
- 2025–26: Segunda Federación – Group 2, 1st of 18 (champions)
- Website: realunionclub.com
| Home colours | Away colours |

Real Unión Club, S.A.D. is a Spanish football club based in Irun, in the autonomous community of the Basque Country, in the province of Gipuzkoa, near the border with France. Founded on 15 May 1915, it currently plays in Primera Federación – Group 1, holding home matches at the 5,000-seater Stadium Gal. Real Unión won the Copa del Rey four times, and was one of the founding members of La Liga in 1929. The club spent four seasons in the Spanish elite, suffering relegation in 1932. Real Unión is yet to return to the top tier, spending the rest of its history bouncing between the second and fourth tiers of Spanish football.

== History ==
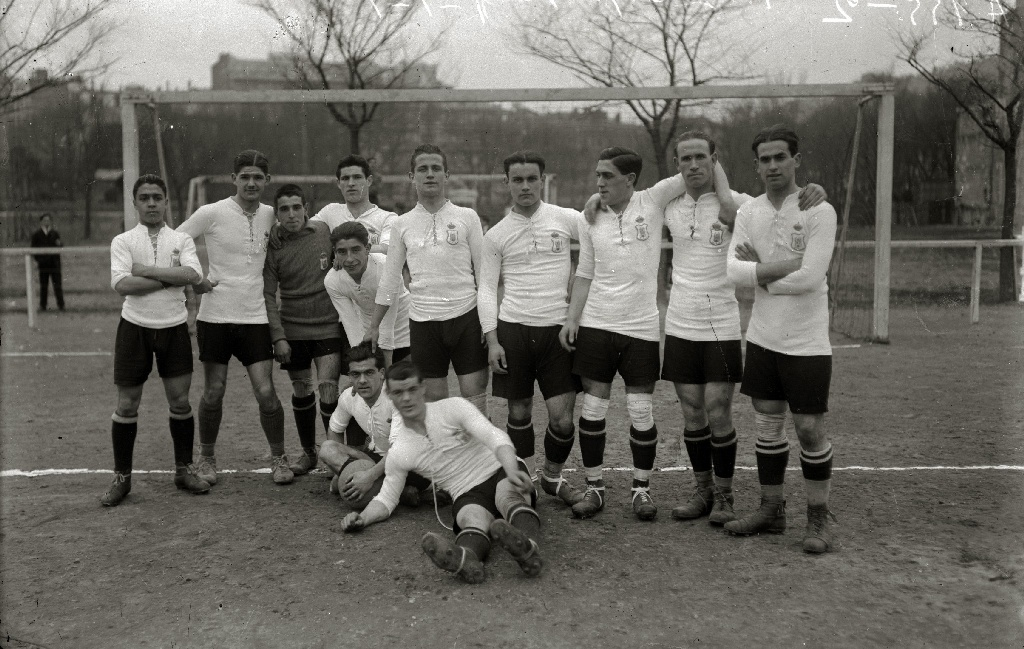
Real Unión squad of 1916.

Real Unión were among the early pioneering Spanish football teams and, along with fellow Basque clubs Athletic Bilbao, Real Sociedad and Arenas Club de Getxo were founding members of La Liga, in 1928. The club was formed in 1915 following the merger of Irún Sporting Club and Racing Club de Irún. The former was founded in 1902 as Irún Foot-Ball Club, changing its name in 1907. The latter, formed in 1908, had already won the 1913 Copa del Rey, beating Athletic Bilbao 1–0 in a replayed final. The club was briefly known as Unión Club Irún before Alfonso XIII gave the club royal approval, but during the Second Spanish Republic the club reverted to this name.

Real Unión then won the Copa del Rey a further three times, beating Real Madrid in 1918 and again in 1924 (with former Derby County and England striker Steve Bloomer acting as their coach). In 1927, they defeated Arenas Getxo in the first all-Basque final. The latter two finals both ended in 1–0 victories, with José Echeveste netting the winner on both occasions. In 1922, they were runners-up, losing 5–1 to Barcelona. In 1930, they participated in the Coupe des Nations in Geneva, Switzerland, a predecessor of the UEFA Champions League since the champions of all major European football nations were invited, although it has never been entirely clear why Unión was invited as they had finished sixth in the 1929–30 La Liga. Nonetheless, they were eliminated in the quarter-finals by Slavia Prague. The club was relegated from La Liga in 1932.

In 1920, when Spain made their international debut at the Olympic Games, the club provided the squad with two players—Eguiazábal and Patricio, the latter scoring Spain's first-ever goal in international football in a 1–0 victory over Denmark on 28 August 1920. Another Real Unión player, René Petit, took part in the same Olympic Games with France. In the 70s and 80s, Spanish internationals Javier Irureta and Roberto López Ufarte began their career with the club.

On 11 November 2008, in the 2008–09 Copa del Rey against Real Madrid, Real Unión lost 3–4 at the Santiago Bernabéu, but secured a famous aggregate victory following a 3–2 home victory in the first leg (away goals rule). It was the first time in history that Real Madrid were eliminated by a Segunda División B team at home.

The club finally returned to the Segunda División in 2009 after a 44-year absence, successively defeating Sabadell (2–1 aggregate) and Alcorcón (3–1) in the 2008–09 promotion play-offs. However, it would be a short-lived return, as the team was immediately relegated, after ranking 21st.

After a season in the Spanish second division, the team was relegated to the third division. In the 2010/11 season, they finished fourth in their group and entered the promotion playoffs. They lost the playoff tiebreaker to Sevilla Atlético after winning the first match 2–1 but losing the second 3–0. The 2011/12 season was inconsistent for Real Unión, and they finished 14th in the league. They finished eighth in 2012/13, and despite financial struggles in 2013/14, they managed to avoid relegation to the fourth division by finishing 15th.

In the 2014/15 season, the team was back fighting for promotion in the playoffs. Unfortunately, they were knocked out in the first round by UCAM Murcia. Murcia scored the winning goal in extra time of the second match – the first game at Stadium Gal had been a 0–0 draw. Despite this disappointment, the team bounced back strong and won the Copa Federación on April 16, 2015, after beating Castellón in a two-game final.

In July 2021, Unai Emery and his family completed a takeover of the club for whom his father and grandfather had played.

In December 2024, the club announced that V Sports, the holding company of Premier League club Aston Villa, managed by Unai Emery, had purchased an approximate 25% stake in the club.

== Season to season ==
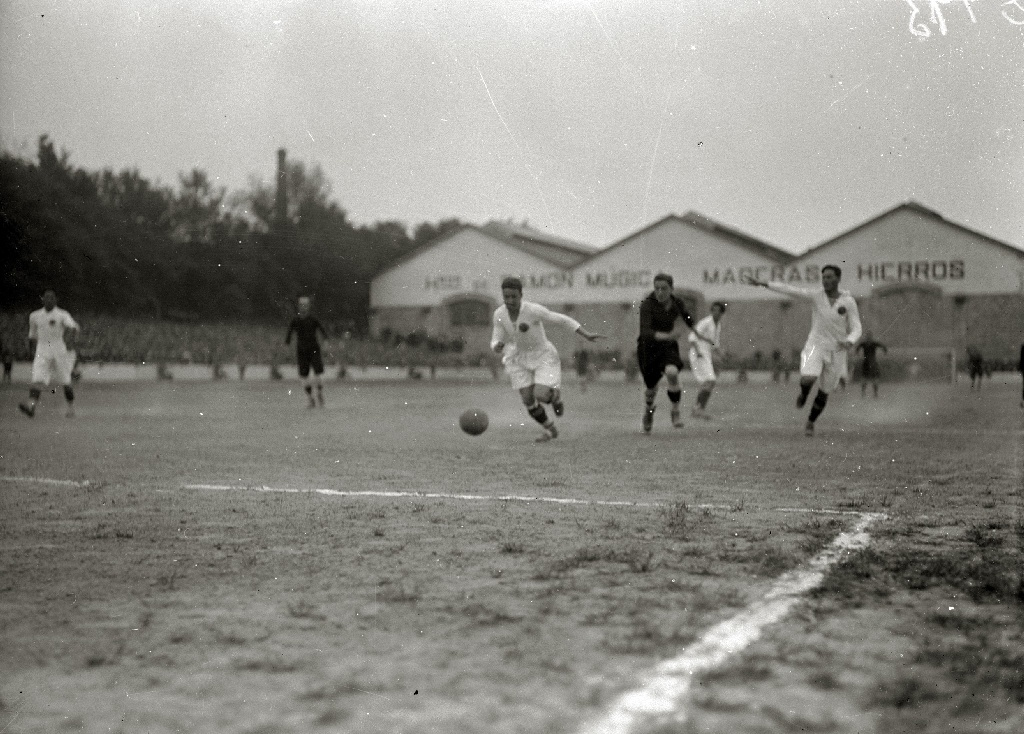
Copa de España 1924 final, Real Unión 1–0 Real Madrid.

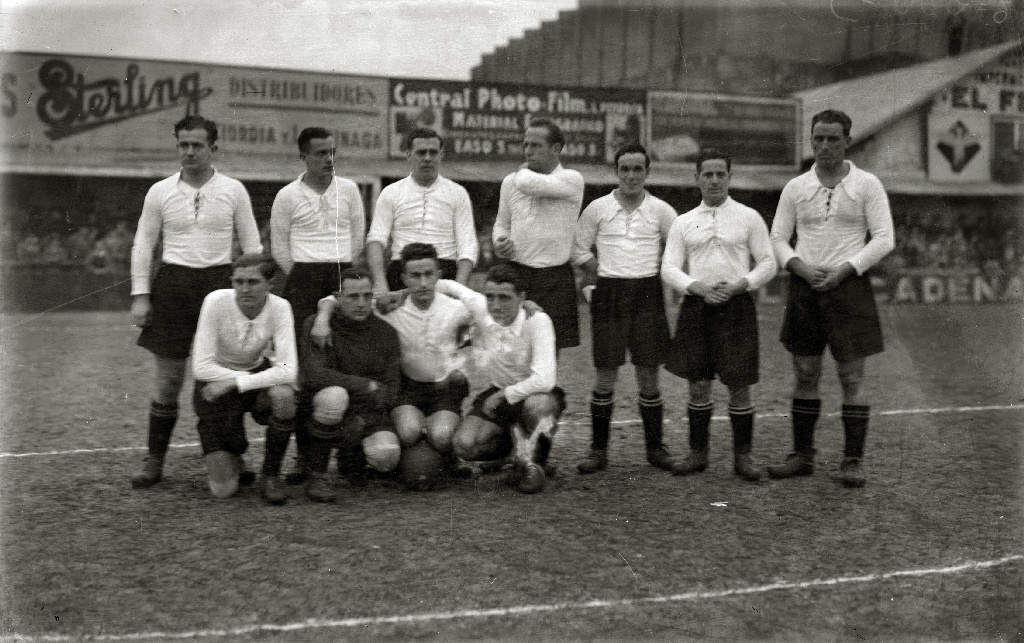
Real Unión squad of 1931

| Season | Tier | Division | Place | Copa del Rey |
|---|---|---|---|---|
| 1929 | 1 | 1ª | 9th | Round of 32 |
| 1929–30 | 1 | 1ª | 6th | Quarterfinals |
| 1930–31 | 1 | 1ª | 7th | Quarterfinals |
| 1931–32 | 1 | 1ª | 10th | Round of 16 |
| 1932–33 | 2 | 2ª | 10th | Round of 16 |
| 1933–34 | 2 | 2ª | 8th | |
| 1934–35 | 2 | 2ª | 5th | Sixth round |
| 1935–36 | 2 | 2ª | 8th | First round |
| 1939–40 | 2 | 2ª | 3rd | |
| 1940–41 | 2 | 2ª | 9th | First round |
| 1941–42 | 2 | 2ª | 8th | |
| 1942–43 | 3 | 1ª Reg. | 7th | |
| 1943–44 | 3 | 3ª | 10th | First round |
| 1944–45 | 3 | 3ª | 9th | |
| 1945–46 | 3 | 3ª | 10th | |
| 1946–47 | 3 | 3ª | 5th | |
| 1947–48 | 3 | 3ª | 5th | Second round |
| 1948–49 | 3 | 3ª | 10th | First round |
| 1949–50 | 3 | 3ª | 17th | |
| 1950–51 | 3 | 3ª | 17th | |

| Season | Tier | Division | Place | Copa del Rey |
|---|---|---|---|---|
| 1951–52 | 4 | 1ª Reg. | 12th | |
| 1952–53 | 4 | 1ª Reg. | 3rd | |
| 1953–54 | 4 | 1ª Reg. | 6th | |
| 1954–55 | 4 | 1ª Reg. | 5th | |
| 1955–56 | 4 | 1ª Reg. | 4th | |
| 1956–57 | 3 | 3ª | 12th | |
| 1957–58 | 3 | 3ª | 1st | |
| 1958–59 | 2 | 2ª | 16th | Preliminary |
| 1959–60 | 3 | 3ª | 2nd | |
| 1960–61 | 3 | 3ª | 5th | |
| 1961–62 | 3 | 3ª | 4th | |
| 1962–63 | 3 | 3ª | 2nd | |
| 1963–64 | 3 | 3ª | 1st | |
| 1964–65 | 2 | 2ª | 16th | Round of 32 |
| 1965–66 | 3 | 3ª | 7th | |
| 1966–67 | 3 | 3ª | 2nd | |
| 1967–68 | 3 | 3ª | 4th | |
| 1968–69 | 3 | 3ª | 2nd | |
| 1969–70 | 3 | 3ª | 6th | First round |
| 1970–71 | 3 | 3ª | 14th | Third round |

| Season | Tier | Division | Place | Copa del Rey |
|---|---|---|---|---|
| 1971–72 | 3 | 3ª | 19th | First round |
| 1972–73 | 4 | 1ª Reg. | 2nd | |
| 1973–74 | 4 | 1ª Reg. | 3rd | |
| 1974–75 | 3 | 3ª | 12th | Second round |
| 1975–76 | 3 | 3ª | 4th | First round |
| 1976–77 | 3 | 3ª | 7th | First round |
| 1977–78 | 3 | 2ª B | 10th | Third round |
| 1978–79 | 3 | 2ª B | 17th | First round |
| 1979–80 | 4 | 3ª | 14th | First round |
| 1980–81 | 4 | 3ª | 9th | |
| 1981–82 | 4 | 3ª | 6th | |
| 1982–83 | 4 | 3ª | 8th | First round |
| 1983–84 | 4 | 3ª | 4th | |
| 1984–85 | 4 | 3ª | 8th | First round |
| 1985–86 | 4 | 3ª | 12th | |
| 1986–87 | 4 | 3ª | 8th | |
| 1987–88 | 4 | 3ª | 5th | |
| 1988–89 | 4 | 3ª | 6th | |
| 1989–90 | 4 | 3ª | 5th | |
| 1990–91 | 4 | 3ª | 16th | First round |

| Season | Tier | Division | Place | Copa del Rey |
|---|---|---|---|---|
| 1991–92 | 4 | 3ª | 1st | |
| 1992–93 | 4 | 3ª | 1st | Second round |
| 1993–94 | 3 | 2ª B | 14th | |
| 1994–95 | 3 | 2ª B | 5th | |
| 1995–96 | 3 | 2ª B | 5th | First round |
| 1996–97 | 3 | 2ª B | 11th | First round |
| 1997–98 | 3 | 2ª B | 18th | |
| 1998–99 | 4 | 3ª | 3rd | |
| 1999–2000 | 3 | 2ª B | 16th | First round |
| 2000–01 | 3 | 2ª B | 9th | |
| 2001–02 | 3 | 2ª B | 6th | |
| 2002–03 | 3 | 2ª B | 1st | Round of 16 |
| 2003–04 | 3 | 2ª B | 12th | Second round |
| 2004–05 | 3 | 2ª B | 2nd | |
| 2005–06 | 3 | 2ª B | 5th | Third round |
| 2006–07 | 3 | 2ª B | 4th | Second round |
| 2007–08 | 3 | 2ª B | 5th | Round of 32 |
| 2008–09 | 3 | 2ª B | 1st | Round of 16 |
| 2009–10 | 2 | 2ª | 21st | Second round |
| 2010–11 | 3 | 2ª B | 4th | Round of 32 |

| Season | Tier | Division | Place | Copa del Rey |
|---|---|---|---|---|
| 2011–12 | 3 | 2ª B | 14th | First round |
| 2012–13 | 3 | 2ª B | 8th | |
| 2013–14 | 3 | 2ª B | 15th | First round |
| 2014–15 | 3 | 2ª B | 4th | |
| 2015–16 | 3 | 2ª B | 5th | First round |
| 2016–17 | 3 | 2ª B | 7th | First round |
| 2017–18 | 3 | 2ª B | 13th | First round |
| 2018–19 | 3 | 2ª B | 16th | |
| 2019–20 | 3 | 2ª B | 17th | |
| 2020–21 | 3 | 2ª B | 5th / 1st | |
| 2021–22 | 3 | 1ª RFEF | 8th | First round |
| 2022–23 | 3 | 1ª Fed. | 13th | Second round |
| 2023–24 | 3 | 1ª Fed. | 15th | |
| 2024–25 | 3 | 1ª Fed. | 18th | |
| 2025–26 | 4 | 2ª Fed. | 1st | |
| 2026–27 | 3 | 1ª Fed. | | TBD |

- 4 seasons in La Liga
- 10 seasons in Segunda División
- 5 seasons in Primera Federación/Primera División RFEF
- 27 seasons in Segunda División B
- 1 season in Segunda Federación
- 40 seasons in Tercera División
- 7 seasons in Categorías Regionales

== Current squad ==
As of 4 November 2026.

Note: Flags indicate national team as defined under FIFA eligibility rules; some limited exceptions apply. Players may hold more than one non-FIFA nationality.

| No. | Pos. | Nation | Player |
|---|---|---|---|
| 1 | GK | ESP | Jon Tena |
| 2 | DF | ESP | Javi Fontán |
| 3 | DF | ESP | Álvaro Mateo |
| 4 | DF | ESP | Jordi González-Pola |
| 5 | DF | ESP | Gaizka Martínez |
| 6 | MF | ESP | Beñat Gaubeka |
| 7 | MF | ESP | Unai García |
| 8 | DF | ESP | Paul Álvarez |
| 9 | FW | ESP | Peru Ruiz |
| 10 | MF | ESP | Martín Arruti |
| 11 | FW | ESP | Aitor Galarza |
| 13 | GK | ESP | Lander Emery |

| No. | Pos. | Nation | Player |
|---|---|---|---|
| 14 | MF | ESP | Yassin Tallal (on loan from Getafe) |
| 15 | MF | ESP | Martín Merquelanz |
| 17 | DF | ESP | Unai Medina |
| 19 | FW | ESP | Ekain Azkune |
| 20 | MF | ESP | Ander Martín |
| 21 | DF | ESP | Urtzi Albizua |
| 22 | MF | ESP | Juan de la Mata |
| 23 | MF | ESP | Luca Sangalli |
| 26 | MF | NGR | Mustapha Muhammad |
| 27 | GK | ESP | Odei Rodríguez |
| 28 | MF | ESP | Markel Mancisidor |

=== Reserve team ===
Note: Flags indicate national team as defined under FIFA eligibility rules; some limited exceptions apply. Players may hold more than one non-FIFA nationality.

| No. | Pos. | Nation | Player |
|---|---|---|---|
| 29 | DF | ESP | Imanol Ruiz de Illa |
| 30 | DF | ESP | Aritz Amenabar |
| 32 | MF | ESP | Ander Sánchez |

| No. | Pos. | Nation | Player |
|---|---|---|---|
| 33 | DF | ESP | Gerard Caixàs |
| 34 | MF | GHA | Henry Opoku |

== Honours ==
- Copa del Rey:
  - Winners (3): (Note: Four titles counting the trophy won by Racing Club de Irún in 1913) 1918, 1924, 1927
  - Runners-up (1): 1922
- Copa Federación de España: Winners 2014–15
- Segunda División B: Winners: (Note: Third tier) 2002–03, (Note: Not promoted in play-offs) 2008–09 (Note: Promoted in play-offs)
- Tercera División: Winners 1957–58, (Note: Third tier) (Note: Promoted in play-offs) 1963–64; (Note: Promoted in play-offs) 1991–92, (Note: Fourth tier) (Note: Not promoted in play-offs) 1992–93 (Note: Promoted in play-offs)
- North Regional Championship: Winners 1917–18
- Gipuzkoa Championship: Winners (8) 1919–20, 1920–21, 1921–22, 1923–24, 1925–26, 1927–28, 1929–30, 1930–31
- RFEF Basque tournament: Winners 1998–99, 2014–15

=== International ===
- Tournoi de Pâques de l'Olympique de Pantin

Winners: 1922

- Tournoi de Pentecôte de Paris Football Latin

Winners: 1923

- Tournoi "Stade Buffalo" de Paris

Runners-up: 1930

== Notable former players ==
- (Chile) Juan Legarreta
- (France) Manuel Anatol
- (France) René Petit
- (Hong Kong) Shinichi Chan
- (Mexico) Juan Ángel Seguro
- (Spain) Patricio Arabolaza
- (Spain) Ramón Eguiazábal
- (Spain) Julio Elícegui
- (Spain) Juan Errazquin
- (Spain) Iker Gabarain
- (Spain) Francisco Gamborena
- (Spain) Javier Irureta
- (Spain) Roberto López Ufarte
- (Spain) Xabier Otermin
- (Spain) Luis Regueiro
- (Spain) Pedro Regueiro
- (Spain) Manuel Sagarzazu

Category:Real Unión footballers

== Former coaches ==
- (England) Steve Bloomer
- (Spain) Javier Zubillaga

== See also ==
- Real Unión B, reserve team
