= José Maria Yermo =

Spanish sportsman (1903–1960)

José María Yermo
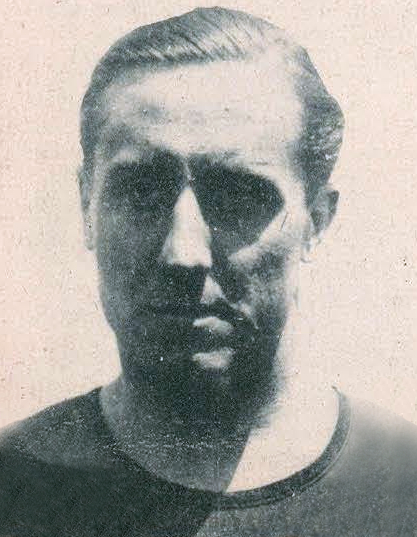
- José María Yermo in 1927

Personal information
- Full name: José María Yermo Solaegui
- Date of birth: 21 June 1903
- Place of birth: Las Arenas, Spain
- Date of death: 21 October 1960 (aged 57)
- Place of death: Bilbao, Spain
- Position: Striker

Senior career*
Years	Team	Apps	(Gls)
1923–1935	Arenas	51	(30)

International career
1928	Spain	5	(5)
- * Club domestic league appearances and goals

José María Yermo Solaegui (21 June 1903 – 21 October 1960) was a Spanish athlete who participated in football, cycling and athletics during the 1920s and 1930s. He was born in Getxo.

He was first noted as an athlete and held the Spanish record for long jump and triple jump. At the 1923 edition of the Spanish Athletics Championships, he achieved a silver medal in the triple jump event, while he got silver in the 110 metres hurdles and bronze in the long jump and high jump in 1924, and silvers in high jump and triple jump in 1925. As an athlete he defended the colours of Arenas Club de Getxo, with whom he also played in the football team as a striker.

He played five times in the Spain national football team and participated in the 1928 Summer Olympics, scoring three goals in the first round match that Spain won against Mexico 7–1. He was also twice vice-champion of the Spanish Cup (Copa del Rey) with Arenas Club in 1925 and 1927. He retired from football in 1935.

Yermo was also a cyclist, participating in a World Championship and the Amsterdam Summer Olympic Games in 1928.
