= List of Real Sociedad managers =

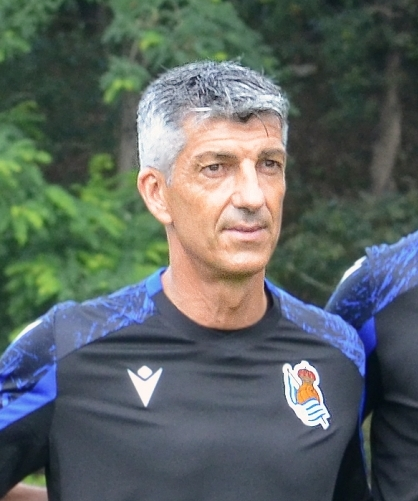
Imanol Alguacil is the head coach who has managed the most matches for Real Sociedad.

Real Sociedad Club de Fútbol is a professional football club based in San Sebastián, Basque Country, Spain, which plays in La Liga. This chronological list comprises all those who have held the position of manager of the first team of Real Sociedad from 1909, when the first professional manager was appointed, to the present day. Each manager's entry includes his dates of tenure and the club's overall competitive record (in terms of matches won, drawn and lost), major honours won and significant achievements under his leadership. Caretaker managers are included, where known. As of the end of the 2024–25 season, Real Sociedad have had 45 full-time managers.

The first full-time manager for Real Sociedad was Pepe Berraondo.

The most successful coach with Real Sociedad is Alberto Ormaetxea, as won 3 titles with the team. He won La Liga twice, and one Spanish Super Cup.

== List of managers ==
The complete list of Real Sociedad managers is shown in the following table:

Information correct as of the match played 30 June 2025. Only competitive matches are counted.

| Manager | Nat. | To | G^{[A]} | W | D | L | Win% (Note: A draw counts as a ½ win) | Honours | Notes |
|---|---|---|---|---|---|---|---|---|---|
| (Spain) José Berraondo | 1 July 1918 | 30 June 1923 | | | | | | Gipuzkoa Championship (2); Torneo San Sebastián | |
| (Hungary) Lippo Hertzka | 1 July 1923 | 30 June 1926 | | | | | | Gipuzkoa Championship | |
| (Spain) Luis Ortiz de Urbina | 1 July 1926 | 30 June 1927 | | | | | | Gipuzkoa Championship | |
| (Spain) Benito Díaz (1) | 1 July 1928 | 30 June 1930 | 36 | 13 | 8 | 15 | 47.22% | Gipuzkoa Championship | |
| (England) Harry Lowe | 1 July 1930 | 30 June 1935 | 96 | 35 | 11 | 50 | 42.19% | Gipuzkoa-Navarra-Aragon Championship | |
| (Spain) Gaspar Gurruchaga | 1939 | 1939 | 14 | 5 | 2 | 7 | 42.86% | | |
| (Spain) Sebastián Silveti | 1 July 1939 | 30 November 1941 | 31 | 4 | 11 | 46 | 71.74% | | |
| (Spain) Patxi Gamborena | 1 December 1941 | 30 June 1942 | 16 | 2 | 1 | 13 | 15.63% | | |
| (Spain) Benito Díaz (2) | 1 July 1942 | 30 June 1951 | 226 | 102 | 42 | 82 | 54.42% | | |
| (Spain) José Ignacio Urbieta | 1 July 1951 | 30 June 1955 | 120 | 41 | 25 | 54 | 44.58% | | |
| (Spain) Salvador Artigas | 1 July 1955 | 30 June 1960 | 150 | 49 | 36 | 65 | 44.67% | | |
| (Spain) Joseba Elizondo (1) | 1960 | 1960 | only Cup matches | | | | | | |
| (Spain) Baltasar Albéniz | 1 July 1960 | 1962 | 48 | 13 | 15 | 20 | 42.71% | | |
| (Spain) Joseba Elizondo (2) | 1962 | 1962 | 12 | 6 | 0 | 6 | 50% | | |
| (Spain) Pedro Torres | 1962 | 1964 | 30 | 14 | 7 | 9 | 58.33% | | |
| (Spain) Antonio Barrios | 1 July 1963 | 30 June 1964 | 30 | 14 | 5 | 11 | 55% | | |
| (Spain) Román Galarraga | 1 July 1964 | 30 June 1966 | 60 | 26 | 11 | 23 | 52.5% | | |
| (Spain) Andoni Elizondo (1) | 1 July 1966 | 30 June 1970 | 120 | 55 | 22 | 43 | 55% | Trofeo Ciudad de San Sebastián | |
| (Spain) Ángel Segurola | 1 July 1970 | 3 October 1971 | 35 | 11 | 10 | 14 | 45.71% | | |
| (Spain) Andoni Elizondo (2) | 4 October 1971 | 30 June 1972 | | | | | | | |
| (Spain) Rafael Iriondo | 1 July 1972 | 30 June 1974 | 68 | 29 | 15 | 24 | 53.68% | | |
| (Spain) Andoni Elizondo (3) | 1 July 1974 | 30 June 1976 | 50 | 15 | | | 30% | | |
| (Spain) José Antonio Irulegui | 1 July 1976 | 30 June 1978 | 86 | 33 | 22 | 31 | 51.16% | | |
| (Spain) Alberto Ormaetxea | 1 July 1978 | 30 June 1985 | 238 | 113 | 66 | 59 | 61.34% | | |
| (Wales) John Toshack (1) | 1 July 1985 | 8 May 1989 | 181 | 84 | 45 | 52 | 58.84% | | |
| (Spain) Marco Antonio Boronat | 9 May 1989 | 14 January 1991 | 76 | 24 | 32 | 20 | 52.63% | | |
| (Spain) Javier Expósito | 15 January 1991 | 30 June 1991 | 20 | 7 | 7 | 6 | 52.5% | | |
| (Wales) John Toshack (2) | 1 July 1991 | 21 November 1994 | 141 | 49 | 41 | 51 | 49.29% | | |
| (Spain) Salva Iriarte | 22 November 1994 | 27 November 1995 | 41 | 14 | 14 | 13 | 51.22% | | |
| (Spain) Javier Irureta | 28 November 1995 | 30 June 1997 | 84 | 35 | 21 | 28 | 54.17% | | |
| (Austria) Bernd Krauss | 1 July 1997 | 25 October 1999 | 85 | 32 | 30 | 23 | 55.29% | | |
| (Spain) Javier Clemente | 26 October 1999 | 23 October 2000 | 35 | 10 | 13 | 12 | 47.14% | | |
| (Spain) Periko Alonso | 24 October 2000 | 21 December 2000 | 10 | 2 | 1 | 7 | 25% | | |
| (Wales) John Toshack (3) | 22 December 2000 | 11 March 2002 | 52 | 16 | 13 | 23 | 43.27% | | |
| (Spain) Roberto Olabe | 12 March 2002 | 30 June 2002 | 9 | 5 | 2 | 2 | 66.67% | | |
| (France) Raynald Denoueix | 1 July 2002 | 30 June 2004 | 85 | 35 | 26 | 24 | 56.47% | | |
| (Spain) José María Amorrortu | 1 July 2004 | 30 January 2006 | 59 | 19 | 12 | 18 | 42.37% | | |
| (Spain) Gonzalo Arconada | 31 January 2006 | 23 March 2006 | 8 | 2 | 0 | 6 | 25% | | |
| (Spain) José Mari Bakero | 23 March 2006 | 26 October 2006 | 16 | 3 | 5 | 8 | 34.38% | | |
| (Spain) Miguel Ángel Lotina | 26 October 2006 | 30 June 2007 | 31 | 8 | 9 | 14 | 40.32% | | |
| (Wales) Chris Coleman | 1 July 2007 | 16 January 2008 | 21 | 8 | 7 | 6 | 54.76% | | |
| (Spain) José Ramón Eizmendi | 15 January 2008 | 2 April 2008 | 11 | 5 | 2 | 4 | 54.55% | | |
| (Spain) Juan Manuel Lillo | 3 April 2008 | 30 June 2009 | 55 | 23 | 21 | 11 | 60.91% | | |
| (Uruguay) Martín Lasarte | 1 July 2009 | 30 June 2011 | 82 | 34 | 17 | 31 | 51.83% | | |
| (France) Philippe Montanier | 1 July 2011 | 30 June 2013 | 82 | 32 | 24 | 26 | 53.66% | | |
| (Spain) Jagoba Arrasate | 1 July 2013 | 3 November 2014 | 67 | 25 | 18 | 24 | 50.75% | | |
| (Scotland) David Moyes | 10 November 2014 | 9 November 2015 | 42 | 12 | 15 | 15 | 46.43% | | |
| (Spain) Eusebio Sacristán | 9 November 2015 | 19 March 2018 | 112 | 46 | 23 | 43 | 51.34% | | |
| (Spain) Imanol Alguacil (1) | 19 March 2018 | 24 May 2018 | 9 | 5 | 1 | 3 | 61.11% | | |
| (Spain) Asier Garitano | 24 May 2018 | 26 December 2018 | 19 | 6 | 5 | 8 | 44.74% | Trofeo Diputación Foral de Álava | |
| (Spain) Imanol Alguacil (2) | 26 December 2018 | 30 June 2025 | 330 | 153 | 84 | 93 | 59.09% | | |
| (Spain) Sergio Francisco | 1 July 2025 | 14 December 2025 | 18 | 6 | 4 | 8 | 44.44% | | |

== Trophies and Honours ==
=== Trophies ===
| No. | Name | Liga | Copa | Supercopa | Total |
|---|---|---|---|---|---|
| 1. | (Basque Country (autonomous community)) Alberto Ormaetxea | 2 | 0 | 1 | 3 |
| 2. | (Wales) John Toshack | 0 | 1 | – | 1 |
| 2. | (Basque Country (autonomous community)) Imanol Alguacil | 0 | 1 | 0 | 1 |

=== Honours ===
Don Balón Award

Alberto Ormaetxea (1980–81, 1981–82)
John Benjamin Toshack (1988–89)
Raynald Denoueix (2002–03)

Miguel Muñoz Trophy

Imanol Alguacil (2022–23)
