= 1950–51 Real Sociedad season =

Real Sociedad
1950–51 season
- President: Felipe de Arteche
- Head coach: Benito Díaz
- Stadium: Atotxa
- La Liga: 5th
- Copa del Generalisimo: Runners-up
- Top goalscorer: League: Caeiro (17); Epi (17); All: Caeiro (19)
Home colours

During the season the club competed in Primera Division and Copa del Generalisimo.

== Squad ==
Note: Flags indicate national team as defined under FIFA eligibility rules; some limited exceptions apply. Players may hold more than one non-FIFA nationality.

| No. | Pos. | Nation | Player |
|---|---|---|---|
| — | GK | ESP | Ignacio Eizaguirre |
| — | GK | ESP | Juan Bagur |
| — | DF | ESP | Antonio Aldonza |
| — | DF | ESP | Mariano Bernal |
| — | DF | ESP | Patri Eguidazu |
| — | DF | ESP | José María Marculeta |
| — | DF | ESP | Fernando Murillo |
| — | DF | ESP | Ricardo Suárez |
| — | MF | ESP | Rafael Alsúa |
| — | MF | ESP | Salvador Artigas |
| — | MF | ESP | Sebastián Ontoria |

| No. | Pos. | Nation | Player |
|---|---|---|---|
| — | MF | ESP | Peporro |
| — | FW | ESP | Sabino Barinaga |
| — | FW | ESP | Carlos Basabe |
| — | FW | ESP | José Caeiro |
| — | FW | ESP | Jose María Castivia |
| — | FW | ESP | Epi Fernández |
| — | FW | ESP | Luis Hériz |
| — | FW | ESP | Silvestre Igoa |
| — | FW | ESP | Ángel Paz |
| — | FW | ESP | José María Pérez |

=== Transfers ===
In
| Pos. | Name | From | Type |
|---|---|---|---|
| GK | Iñazki Eizagirre | Valencia CF | |
| DF | Antonio Aldonza | | |
| DF | Mariano Bernal | | |
| MF | Rafael Alsúa | Racing Santander | |
| MF | Peporro | | |
| FW | Sabino Baraniaga | Real Madrid | |
| FW | Luis Hériz | | |
| FW | Silvestre Igoa | Valencia CF | |
| FW | Ángel Paz | | |

Out
| Pos. | Name | To | Type |
|---|---|---|---|
| GK | Ramón Galarraga | | |
| GK | Dionisio del Río | CD Logroñés | |
| DF | José Manuel Arrizabalaga | | |
| MF | José María Gomes Bravo | | |
| MF | Aridex Calligaris | | |
| MF | Isidoro Urra | Real Zaragoza | |
| MF | Manolín Pérez Dueñas | | |
| FW | Víctor Arguiñano | CD Logroñés | |
| FW | Santos Falcón | CA Osasuna | |
| FW | Perfecto Gastón | Orensana | |
| FW | José Luis Pérez Paya | Atlético Madrid | |

== Results ==
=== Primera División ===
==== League table ====
| Pos | Team | Pld | W | D | L | GF | GA | GD | Pts |
|---|---|---|---|---|---|---|---|---|---|
| 3 | Valencia | 30 | 17 | 3 | 10 | 64 | 48 | +16 | 37 |
| 4 | Barcelona | 30 | 16 | 3 | 11 | 83 | 61 | +22 | 35 |
| 5 | Real Sociedad | 30 | 15 | 5 | 10 | 77 | 56 | +21 | 35 |
| 6 | Valladolid | 30 | 14 | 5 | 11 | 51 | 51 | 0 | 33 |
| 7 | Atlético Bilbao | 30 | 15 | 3 | 12 | 88 | 56 | +32 | 33 |

Source: BDFútbol
Rules for classification: 1) Points; 2) Head-to-head results; 3) Goal difference; 4) Number of goals scored

==== Position by round ====
| Round | 1 | 2 | 3 | 4 | 5 | 6 | 7 | 8 | 9 | 10 | 11 | 12 | 13 | 14 | 15 | 16 | 17 | 18 | 19 | 20 | 21 | 22 | 23 | 24 | 25 | 26 | 27 | 28 | 29 | 30 |
|---|---|---|---|---|---|---|---|---|---|---|---|---|---|---|---|---|---|---|---|---|---|---|---|---|---|---|---|---|---|---|
| Ground | A | H | A | H | A | H | H | A | H | A | H | A | H | A | H | A | H | H | A | H | A | A | H | A | H | A | H | A | H | A |
| Result | L | W | D | W | W | W | L | W | D | W | L | W | L | W | L | W | L | W | L | W | D | W | L | D | L | W | D | W | L | W |
| Position | 13 | 10 | 7 | 4 | 3 | 2 | 5 | 2 | 3 | 3 | 4 | 4 | 4 | 4 | 4 | 4 | 5 | 4 | 4 | 4 | 3 | 3 | 4 | 5 | 6 | 5 | 6 | 5 | 6 | 5 |

Source: BD Futbol Squad of Real Sociedad 1950-51
A = Away; H = Home; W = Win; D = Draw; L = Loss

==== Matches ====
| 10 September 1950 1 | Barcelona | 8–2 | Real Sociedad | Barcelona |
| | Aloy 11'; César 14', 26', 61' (pen.), 89'; Basora 15', 80'; Szegedi 85' | Report | Basabe 4'; Igoa 22' | Stadium: Les Corts; Referee: Fombona Fernández |

| 17 September 1950 2 | Real Sociedad | 6–2 | Real Madrid | San Sebastián |
| | Igoa 14', 25', 77'; Caeiro 65'; Epi 70'; Basabe 74' | Report | Marculeta II 54' (o.g.); Cabrera 80' | Stadium: Atotxa; Referee: Giménez Molina |

=== Copa del Rey ===
==== First round ====
| 29 April 1951 | Real Sociedad | 4–1 | Celta Vigo | San Sebastián |
| | Caeiro 27'; Igoa 53'; Alsúa 67', 70' | Report | Vázquez 61' | Stadium: Atotxa; Referee: Trapote López |

| 3 May 1951 | Celta Vigo | 1–1 | Real Sociedad | Vigo |
| | Vázquez 43' | Report | Alsúa 48' | Stadium: Balaídos; Referee: Zariquiegui Izco |

==== Quarter-finals ====
| 6 May 1951 | Real Sociedad | 3–2 | Racing de Santander | San Sebastián |
| | Ontoria 26' (pen.), 61'; Pérez 49' | Report | Pin 4'; Ruiz Toro 64' (pen.) | Stadium: Atotxa; Referee: Azón Roma |

| 10 May 1951 | Racing de Santander | 0–3 | Real Sociedad | Santander |
| | | Report | Barinaga 22', 32', 80' | Stadium: El Sardinero; Referee: Mazagatos Vicario |

==== Semi-finals ====
| 13 May 1951 | Real Sociedad | 1–0 | Real Madrid | San Sebastián |
| | Artigas 83' | Report | | Stadium: Atotxa; Referee: Blanco Pérez |

| 20 May 1951 | Real Madrid | 0–2 | Real Sociedad | Madrid |
| | | Report | Barinaga 19'; Caeiro 73' | Stadium: Nuevo Chamartín; Referee: Zariquiegui Izco |

==== Final ====
27 May 1951
17:15 CET

| FC Barcelona | 3–0 | Real Sociedad |
|---|---|---|
| César 31', 67'; Gonzalvo 44' | Report (in Spanish) |

Estadio Chamartín, Madrid
Attendance: 75,000
Referee: Manuel Asensi
