= 1951 Copa del Generalísimo final =

Copa del Generalísimo 1951 final
- Event: 1951 Copa del Generalísimo
Barcelona	Real Sociedad
3	0
- Date: 27 May 1951
- Venue: Estadio Chamartín, Madrid
- Referee: Manuel Asensi
- Attendance: 75,000

The Copa del Generalísimo 1951 final was the 49th final of the King's Cup. The final was played at Estadio Chamartín in Madrid, on 27 May 1951, being won by Barcelona, who beat Real Sociedad 3–0.

== Details ==
27 May 1951
17:15 CET

Barcelona	3–0	Real Sociedad
César 31', 67'; Gonzalvo 44'	Report (in Spanish)

Estadio Chamartín, Madrid
Attendance: 75,000
Referee: Manuel Asensi

Barcelona

Real Sociedad

GK	1	(Spain) Antoni Ramallets	(substituted off) 87'
DF	2	(Spain) Francisco Calvet
DF	3	(Spain) Gustau Biosca
DF	4	(Spain) Juan Segarra
MF	5	(Spain) Cheché Martín
MF	6	(Spain) Mariano Gonzalvo
FW	7	(Spain) Josep Seguer
FW	8	(Hungary) László Kubala
FW	9	(Spain) César (c)
FW	10	(Spain) Emilio Aldecoa
FW	11	(Argentina) Mateo Nicolau
Substitutes:
GK	12	(Spain) Juan Velasco	(substituted on) 87'
Manager:
(Czechoslovakia) Ferdinand Daučík

GK	1	(Spain) Ignacio Eizaguirre	(substituted off) 55'
DF	2	(Spain) Fernando Murillo
DF	3	(Spain) Ricardo Suárez
DF	4	(Spain) José María Marculeta
MF	5	(Spain) Sebastián Ontoria (c)
MF	6	(Spain) Patri
FW	7	(Spain) Epi
FW	8	(Spain) Sabino Barinaga
FW	9	(Spain) José Caeiro
FW	10	(Spain) Rafael Alsúa
FW	11	(Spain) José María Pérez
Substitutes:
GK	12	(Spain) Juan Bagur	(substituted on) 55'
Manager:
(Spain) Benito Díaz
