= Luis Ortiz de Urbina =

Spanish footballer and manager

Personal information
- Full name: Luis Valentín Eustasio Ortiz de Urbina Hompanera
- Date of birth: 16 December 1899
- Place of birth: Oiartzun, Spain
- Date of death: 7 May 1959 (aged 59)
- Position: Forward

Senior career*
| Years | Team | Apps | (Gls) |
| 1921–1927 | Real Sociedad | | |

International career
| 1923 | Gipuzkoa | 1 | (0) |

Managerial career
- 1926: Real Sociedad
- * Club domestic league appearances and goals

Luis Valentín Eustasio Ortiz de Urbina Hompanera (16 December 1899 – 7 May 1959), better known as Luis Ortiz de Urbina, was a Spanish footballer who played as a forward for Real Sociedad from 1922 to 1927, during which period he briefly coached the team.

== Early life ==
Luis Ortiz de Urbina was born on 16 December 1899 in Oiartzun, Gipuzkoa, as the eighth and youngest child of Genaro Eustaquio Ortiz de Urbina Olasagasti and María Hompanera Macuso.

== Club career ==
Urbina began his football career at his hometown club Real Sociedad, making his debut on 13 November 1921, one month shy of his 22nd birthday, in a Gipuzkoa Championship match against Real Unión. In his first full season at the club in 1922–23, Urbina played under coach Lippo Hertzka, and together with Agustín Eizaguirre, Antonio Juantegui, José María Sansinenea, and Juan Artola, he was a member of the Sociedad squad that won the 1922–23 Gipuzkoa Championship and then reached the semifinals of the 1923 Copa del Rey, where they got knocked out by the eventual champions Athletic Bilbao.

Urbina stayed with the club for six years until 1927, playing a total of 72 official matches and scoring 52 goals, including 9 headers and one free-kick, thus contributing decisively in helping Sociedad win three Gipuzkoa Championships in 1922–23, 1924–25, and 1926–27. He retired from Sociedad with a balance of 48 wins, 11 draws, and 13 losses (only one loss at home).

In 1926, Urbina briefly managed Sociedad as a player-coach, being quickly replaced by Benito Díaz.

== International career ==
As a Real Sociedad player, Urbina was eligible to play for the Gipuzkoan national team, and together with René Petit, Juan Errazquin, and teammate Antonio Juantegui, he was part of the Gipuzkoan squad that played the 1923–24 edition of the Prince of Asturias Cup, an inter-regional competition organized by the RFEF. Gipuzkoa only played one match, the quarterfinals against Catalonia at Les Corts on 25 November 1923, which ended in a 1–2 loss.

== Death ==
Urbina died on 7 May 1959, at the age of 59.

== Honours ==
Real Sociedad

- Gipuzkoa Championship:
  - Winners (3): 1922–23, 1924–25, and 1926–27
