= Pedro Chillida =

Spanish military man and sports leader

- Born: Pedro Chillida Aramburu; 24 November 1889
- Died: 1956 (aged 66-67)
- Citizenship: Spanish
- Occupations: Military man; Sports leader
- Known for: 16th president of Real Sociedad

16th president of Real Sociedad
- In office 1942–1945
- Preceded by: Francisco Molíns
- Succeeded by: Felipe de Arteche

Pedro Chillida Aramburu (24 November 1889 – 1956) was a Spanish soldier who served as the second president of football club Real Sociedad between 1942 and 1945.

He was the father of the famous sculptor Eduardo Chillida, notable for his monumental abstract works.

== Military career ==
Pedro Chillida graduated from the Toledo Infantry Academy in 1909. He participated in the first phases of the Rif War and was decorated several times, having at that time the rank of first lieutenant.

Chillida belonged to the ultra-Catholic group Basque Right (DVA), which since the founding of the Second Spanish Republic conspired to restore the monarchy. An infantry captain, Chillida was one of the leaders who organized paramilitary groups for the coup, being one of the four men who organized the coup d'état of 18 July 1936 in San Sebastián, which was neutralized by the anarchists; the failure of the coup attempt was such that by noon of that same day, Chillida's group, made up of DVA and Renovación Española militants, had dissolved and its members tried to return to their daily lives so as not to be identified as coup plotters. However, on July 20, those loyal to the Republic put Chillida in the Ondarreta prison until 9 September, when he was transferred to Bilbao aboard the prison ship Arantzazu-Mendi, remaining there until 14 December, when he was transferred to the Carmelo prison in Bilbao. On 19 June 1937, Bilbao was liberated by the troops of Franco, and Chillida surrendered to the military authorities of San Sebastián.

Of conservative ideology, at the end of the Spanish Civil War, he was appointed by the Francoist authorities as a member of the classification commissions for prisoners of war in Catalonia. Chillida was a red hunter until he retired in 1951; he became a military judge in unfair trials held in the first post-war months in Catalonia, where he decided whether the accused should die or not. In May 1939, he was reinstated to active service with the rank of commander.

Pedro Chillida reached the rank of army commander during his military career.

== Sporting career ==
Chillida took over the presidency of Real Sociedad after the resignation of Francisco Molins in 1942 following the club's relegation to the Segunda División. Chillida's first act as president was to recruit a coach who knew the club perfectly, Benito Díaz, who was in France training FC Girondins de Bordeaux. Thanks to Díaz, Real Sociedad returned to the First Division the following year, achieving direct promotion along with Sabadell. However, the following seasons were not good for the club, and it was relegated again in the 1943–44 season: with 17 points in 26 games, Sociedad was one victory away from forcing promotion, but was relegated as second to last. On this occasion, the stay in the Second Division lasted for the following three seasons, and Chillida resigned as a result of the failed promotion in 1945, being replaced as president by Felipe de Arteche, but Díaz continued at the helm of the team and went on to achieve promotion two years later.

== Personal life and death ==
In 1922, being a captain and stationed in the 14th "America" Infantry Regiment, whose garrison was located in Navarre, Chillida requested a marriage license to marry Carmen Juantegui from San Sebastián. The family settles in Plaza Zaragoza in San Sebastián, next to the Hotel Biarritz, property of Carmen Juantegui's family. This is where the couple's three children were born, including the famous sculptor Eduardo Chillida, born in 1924, and Gonzalo Chillida, a painter born in 1926.

Chillida died in 1956, at the age of either 66 or 67.
