= Alain Eizmendi =

Spanish footballer

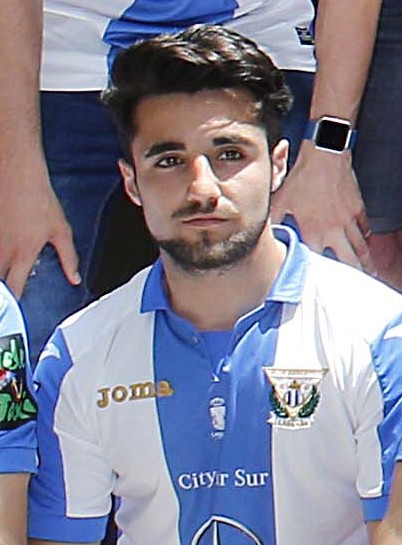
- Eizmendi with Leganés in 2016

Personal information
- Full name: Alain Eizmendi Blanco
- Date of birth: 10 June 1990 (age 36)
- Place of birth: Beasain, Spain
- Height: 1.73 m (5 ft 8 in)
- Position: Winger

Youth career
- 2002–2008: Real Sociedad

Senior career*
Years	Team	Apps	(Gls)
2008–2011	Real Sociedad B	66	(9)
2009	Real Sociedad	1	(0)
2011–2013	Bilbao Athletic	59	(11)
2013–2014	Real Sociedad	0	(0)
2013–2014	→ Eibar (loan)	28	(2)
2014–2016	Leganés	33	(1)
2016	Real Unión	15	(1)
2017	AEL Limassol	11	(0)
2017–2018	Racing Ferrol	14	(1)
2018	Llagostera	14	(1)
2018–2020	Real Unión	52	(6)
2020–2021	Guijuelo	15	(1)
2021–2024	Beasain	76	(15)
- * Club domestic league appearances and goals as of 02:07, 31 August 2024 (UTC)

Alain Eizmendi Blanco (born 10 June 1990) is a Spanish footballer who plays as a winger.

== Club career ==
Born in Beasain, Basque Country, Eizmendi joined Real Sociedad's youth system in 2002, aged 12. He made his senior debut in the 2008–09 season, playing for the reserves in the Segunda División B and being relegated. On 20 June 2009 he made his professional debut with the first team, coming on as a second-half substitute in a 2–1 Segunda División away win against Elche CF.

On 30 June 2011, Eizmendi rejected a contract extension and signed a two-year deal with neighbouring Athletic Bilbao, being assigned to the B team also in the third tier. In his second year, he scored a career-best seven goals in 31 matches as they failed to promote in the playoffs. On 19 June 2013, he was released.

Eizmendi returned to Real Sociedad in July 2013, being subsequently loaned to SD Eibar. On 17 July 2014, after achieving promotion to La Liga, he agreed to a one-year contract at CD Leganés; he renewed his link with the latter club on 9 July of the following year, and won another promotion at the end of the season.

In the following years, expect for a fleeting spell in the Cypriot First Division with AEL Limassol, Eizmendi competed in the Spanish lower leagues. In September 2021, he joined his hometown side SD Beasain.

== Personal life ==
Eizmendi's twin brother, Eneko, was also a footballer and a midfielder. He too was groomed at Real Sociedad, but spent all of his career in the lower leagues.

Their father, Francisco Javier, and uncle, José Ramón, were also involved in the sport.

== Career statistics ==
As of match played 16 May 2021

Appearances and goals by club, season and competition
Club	Season	League			National Cup		Other		Total	
Club	Season	Division	Apps	Goals	Apps	Goals	Apps	Goals	Apps	Goals
Real Sociedad B	2008–09	Segunda División B	7	1	—		—		7	1
Real Sociedad B	2009–10	Tercera División	?	?	—		—		?	?
Real Sociedad B	2010–11	Segunda División B	33	5	—		—		33	5
Real Sociedad B	Total		40	6	0	0	0	0	40	6
Real Sociedad	2008–09	Segunda División	1	0	0	0	—		1	0
Bilbao Athletic	2011–12	Segunda División B	32	5	—		—		32	5
Bilbao Athletic	2012–13	Segunda División B	27	6	—		4 (Note: Appearances in Segunda División B promotion playoffs)	1	31	6
Bilbao Athletic	Total		59	11	0	0	4	1	63	12
Eibar (loan)	2013–14	Segunda División	28	2	2	0	—		30	2
Leganés	2014–15	Segunda División	22	0	0	0	—		22	0
Leganés	2015–16	Segunda División	11	1	1	0	—		12	1
Leganés	Total		33	1	1	0	0	0	34	1
Real Unión	2016–17	Segunda División B	15	1	0	0	—		15	1
AEL Limassol	2016–17	Cypriot First Division	11	0	2	0	—		13	0
Racing Ferrol	2017–18	Segunda División B	14	1	1	0	—		15	1
Llagostera	2017–18	Segunda División B	14	1	0	0	2 (Note: Appearances in Segunda División B relegation playoffs)	0	16	1
Real Unión	2018–19	Segunda División B	36	4	0	0	2	1	38	5
Real Unión	2019–20	Segunda División B	16	2	0	0	—		16	2
Real Unión	Total		52	6	0	0	2	1	54	7
Real Unión	Total Real Unión		67	7	0	0	2	1	69	8
Guijuelo	2020–21	Segunda División B	15	1	1	0	—		16	1
Career total			282	30	7	0	8	2	297	32
