= Aldonza =

Aldonza is a Spanish and Portuguese surname and given name. Notable people with the name include:

== Surname ==
- Antonio Aldonza (1926–2014), Spanish footballer

== Given name ==
- Aldonza Alfonso de León (c. 1215–1266), illegitimate daughter of King Alfonso IX of León and his mistress Aldonza Martínez de Silva
- Aldonza Martínez de Silva (died after 1236), Portuguese noblewoman
- Aldonza Ruiz de Ivorra (1454–1513), Spanish courtier
- Aldonza Lorenzo, the real name of Dulcinea del Toboso, a fictional character from Don Quixote
