= 1997–98 Villarreal CF season =

Villarreal
1997–98 season
- President: Fernando Roig
- Head coach: José Antonio Irulegui
- Stadium: El Madrigal
- Segunda División: 3rd (promoted)
- Play-off: Winners
- Copa del Rey: First round
- Top goalscorer: League: Paco Salillas (17); All: Paco Salillas (17)
- Biggest defeat: Rayo Vallecano 5–0 Villarreal

The 1997–98 season was Villarreal Club de Fútbol's 75th season in existence and the club's 6th consecutive season in the second division of Spanish football. In addition to the domestic league, Villarreal participated in this season's edition of the Copa del Rey. The season covered the period from 1 July 1997 to 30 June 1998.

== Competitions ==
=== Overall record ===
Competition	First match	Last match	Starting round	Final position	Record							
Competition	First match	Last match	Starting round	Final position	Pld	W	D	L	GF	GA	GD	Win %
Segunda División	31 August 1997	15 May 1998	Matchday 1	3rd	42	19	16	7	51	38	+13	45.24
Segunda División promotion play-off	21 May 1998	24 May 1998	First leg	Winners	2	0	2	0	1	1	+0	0.00
Copa del Rey	3 September 1997	10 September 1997	First round	First round	2	0	1	1	0	1	−1	0.00
Total					46	19	19	8	52	40	+12	41.30

Source: BDFutbol

=== Segunda División ===
==== League table ====
Pos	Team	Pld	W	D	L	GF	GA	GD	Pts	Promotion or relegation
2	CF Extremadura	42	23	10	9	60	38	+22	79	Promoted to Primera División
3	UD Las Palmas	42	19	16	7	72	47	+25	73	Promotion playoff
4	Villarreal CF	42	19	16	7	51	38	+13	73	Promotion playoff
5	UE Lleida	42	18	9	15	50	46	+4	63	
6	CD Badajoz	42	16	15	11	48	37	+11	63	

==== Results summary ====
Overall								Home						Away					
Pld	W	D	L	GF	GA	GD	Pts	W	D	L	GF	GA	GD	W	D	L	GF	GA	GD
42	19	16	7	51	38	+13	73	13	6	2	31	13	+18	6	10	5	20	25	−5

==== Results by round ====
Round	1	2	3	4	5	6	7	8	9	10	11	12	13	14	15	16	17	18	19	20	21	22	23	24	25	26	27	28	29	30	31	32	33	34	35	36	37	38	39	40	41	42
Ground	A	H	A	H	H	A	H	A	H	A	H	A	H	A	H	A	H	A	H	A	H	H	A	H	A	A	H	A	H	A	H	A	H	A	H	A	H	A	H	A	H	A
Result	W	W	L	L	D	D	W	D	D	D	D	D	D	D	W	L	W	D	W	L	W	W	L	W	W	L	W	D	D	W	W	W	W	D	L	D	W	D	D	W	W	W
Position	7	2	7	12	14	12	8	8	8	7	10	12	13	13	12	14	11	13	11	12	10	8	8	7	6	7	7	6	7	4	4	4	4	3	4	4	4	4	4	4	4	4

A = Away; H = Home; W = Win; D = Draw; L = Loss

==== Matches ====
31 August 1997 1	Osasuna	0–1	Villarreal	Pamplona
				Stadium: El Sadar

6 September 1997 2	Villarreal	2–1	Hércules	Villarreal
				Stadium: El Madrigal

14 September 1997 3	Rayo Vallecano	5–0	Villarreal	Madrid
				Stadium: La Peineta

21 September 1997 4	Villarreal	0–1	Numancia	Villarreal
				Stadium: El Madrigal

28 September 1997 5	Villarreal	1–1	Toledo	Villarreal
				Stadium: El Madrigal

5 October 1997 6	Albacete	1–1	Villarreal	Albacete
				Stadium: Carlos Belmonte

12 October 1997 7	Villarreal	1–0	Eibar	Villarreal
				Stadium: El Madrigal

15 October 1997 8	Las Palmas	0–0	Villarreal	Las Palmas
				Stadium: Insular

18 October 1997 9	Villarreal	0–0	Lleida	Villarreal
				Stadium: El Madrigal

25 October 1997 10	Ourense	0–0	Villarreal	Ourense
				Stadium: O Couto

2 November 1997 11	Villarreal	1–1	Jaén	Villarreal
				Stadium: El Madrigal

9 November 1997 12	Xerez	1–1	Villarreal	Jerez de la Frontera
				Stadium: Municipal de Chapín

12 November 1997 13	Villarreal	1–1	Elche	Villarreal
				Stadium: El Madrigal

16 November 1997 14	Extremadura	0–0	Villarreal	Almendralejo
				Stadium: Francisco de la Hera

23 November 1997 15	Villarreal	1–0	Badajoz	Villarreal
				Stadium: El Madrigal

30 November 1997 16	Logroñés	3–1	Villarreal	Logroño
				Stadium: Las Gaunas; Referee: Román González

7 December 1997 17	Villarreal	3–0	Sevilla	Villarreal
				Stadium: El Madrigal

13 December 1997 18	Atlético Madrid B	1–1	Villarreal	Madrid
				Stadium: Cerro del Espino; Referee: González Vázquez

17 December 1997 19	Villarreal	3–1	Leganés	Villarreal
				Stadium: El Madrigal

20 December 1997 20	Alavés	5–1	Villarreal	Vitoria-Gasteiz
				Stadium: Mendizorrotza

3 January 1998 21	Villarreal	3–2	Levante	Villarreal
				Stadium: El Madrigal

10 January 1998 22	Villarreal	1–0	Osasuna	Villarreal
				Stadium: El Madrigal

17 January 1998 23	Hércules	2–1	Villarreal	Alicante
				Stadium: José Rico Pérez

25 January 1998 24	Villarreal	3–0	Rayo Vallecano	Villarreal
				Stadium: El Madrigal

1 February 1998 25	Numancia	1–2	Villarreal	Soria
				Stadium: Municipal Los Pajaritos; Referee: Moreno Delgado

8 February 1998 26	Toledo	2–1	Villarreal	Toledo
				Stadium: Salto del Caballo; Referee: Vilaseca Arroyo

15 February 1998 27	Villarreal	1–0	Albacete	Villarreal
				Stadium: El Madrigal

21 February 1998 28	Eibar	0–0	Villarreal	Eibar
				Stadium: Ipurua

1 March 1998 29	Villarreal	0–0	Las Palmas	Villarreal
				Stadium: El Madrigal

8 March 1998 30	Lleida	0–2	Villarreal	Lleida
				Stadium: Camp d'Esports

11 March 1998 31	Villarreal	2–0	Ourense	Villarreal
				Stadium: El Madrigal

14 March 1998 32	Jaén	1–2	Villarreal	Jaén
				Stadium: La Victoria

22 March 1998 33	Villarreal	3–0	Xerez	Villarreal
				Stadium: El Madrigal

28 March 1998 34	Elche	2–2	Villarreal	Elche
				Stadium: Martínez Valero

5 April 1998 35	Villarreal	0–2	Extremadura	Villarreal
				Stadium: El Madrigal

8 April 1998 36	Badajoz	0–0	Villarreal	Badajoz
				Stadium: El Vivero

12 April 1998 37	Villarreal	2–1	Logroñés	Villarreal
				Stadium: El Madrigal

19 April 1998 38	Sevilla	0–0	Villarreal	Seville
				Stadium: Ramón Sánchez Pizjuán

26 April 1998 39	Villarreal	1–1	Atlético Madrid B	Villarreal
				Stadium: El Madrigal

3 May 1998 40	Leganés	0–2	Villarreal	Leganés
				Stadium: Luis Rodríguez de Miguel

9 May 1998 41	Villarreal	2–1	Alavés	Villarreal
				Stadium: El Madrigal

15 May 1998 42	Levante	1–2	Villarreal	Valencia
				Stadium: Nou Estadi

==== Promotion play-offs ====
21 May 1998 First leg	Villarreal	0–0	Compostela	Villarreal
21:45 CEST (UTC+2)				Stadium: El Madrigal; Attendance: 9,000; Referee: Víctor Esquinas Torres

24 May 1998 Second leg	Compostela	1–1 (1–1 (a) agg.)	Villarreal	Santiago de Compostela
21:45 CEST (UTC+2)	Chiba 57'		Alberto 7'	Stadium: Multiusos de San Lázaro; Attendance: 11,500; Referee: Manuel Díaz Vega

=== Copa del Rey ===
==== First round ====
3 September 1997 First leg	Elche	0–0	Villarreal	Elche
				Stadium: Manuel Martínez Valero

10 September 1997 Second leg	Villarreal	0–1 (0–1 agg.)	Elche	Villarreal
				Stadium: El Madrigal
