= José María Pérez (footballer) =

Spanish footballer (1919–1989)

Personal information
- Full name: José María Pérez Medrano
- Date of birth: 2 May 1920
- Place of birth: Lapuebla de Labarca, Spain
- Date of death: 22 July 2008 (aged 88)
- Place of death: San Sebastián, Spain
- Position: Forward

Senior career*
| Years | Team | Apps | (Gls) |
| 1938 | Real Sociedad | | |
| 1939–1940 | Club Discóbolo de Zaragoza | | |
| 1941–1942 | Real Unión | | |
| 1942–1955 | Real Sociedad | 189 | (39) |
| 1955–1956 | Eibar | | |
| Total | | 189 | (39) |
- * Club domestic league appearances and goals

José María Pérez Medrano (2 May 1920 – 22 July 2008) was a Spanish footballer who played as a forward for Real Sociedad between 1942 and 1955.

== Early life ==
Although born in the Álava town of Lapuebla de Labarca on 2 May 1920, Pérez always considered himself a native of San Sebastián, as his family had already settled there.

== Career ==
During the Spanish Civil War, José María and his brother, Félix, responded to the call-up issued by Real Sociedad to restart the club's activity after the interruption caused by the outbreak of the War, playing 6 matches for Sociedad in the 1938 Copa Brigadas de Navarra, a semi-official tournament organized by the Gipuzkoan Football Federation in honor of the Brigades of Navarre. Shortly after, he was mobilized to fight in the War, ending up stationed in Aragon, where he joined the ranks of a local team, Club Discóbolo de Zaragoza, with whom he won the Aragon Championship in the 1939–40 season.

In 1941, Pérez joined Real Unión, then in the Segunda División, and his first (and only) season there ended in relegation. He was subsequently signed by Real Sociedad in 1942, also in the second division, but this time, his first season ended in promotion to the top flight, remaining there for only one season, being then relegated in 1944. He went on to achieve a further two promotions with the club, in 1947 and 1949, winning the second division title on the latter occasion. Together with Ignacio Eizaguirre, Sebastián Ontoria, and Sabino Barinaga, he was a member of the Sociedad team that reached the 1951 Copa del Rey final, which ended in a 3–0 loss to Barcelona.

Pérez stayed at Sociedad for 13 years, from 1942 until 1955, scoring a total of 86 goals in 360 official matches, which ended in 148 wins, 71 draws, and 141 losses. In total, he scored 39 goals in 189 La Liga matches. After leaving Sociedad in 1955, he joined Eibar, where he retired in 1956, aged 36.

== Death ==
Pérez died in San Sebastián on 22 July 2008, at the age of 88. At the time of his death, he was the club's 9th-highest goalscorer with 86 goals.

== Honours ==
Real Sociedad

- Segunda División:
  - Champions (1): 1948–49
- Copa del Rey:
  - Runner-up (1): 1951
