= Adolfo Sáenz =

Spanish lawyer, politician, and sports leader

- Born: Adolfo Sáenz-Alonso; 1875; Portugalete, Spain
- Died: 1964 (88-89); San Sebastián, Spain
- Citizenship: Spanish
- Occupations: Lawyer; Sports leader
- Known for: President of the Real Sociedad

1st president of the Real Sociedad
- In office 1909–1912
- Succeeded by: Enrique Pardiñas

Adolfo Sáenz-Alonso (1875 – 1964) was a Spanish professor of classical languages and sports leader. He was the first president of football club Real Sociedad between 1909 and 1912.

== Early life ==
Adolfo Sáenz was born in 1875 in the Biscayan town of Portugalete, as the son of Álvaro Sáenz, who was a native of Logroño, but had moved to Portugalete to take up his position as a primary school teacher. In 1886, when he was 11-years-old, his father was appointed secretary of the board of public education of Biscay.

== Professional career ==
His professional life was initially linked to teaching, being a professor of classical languages at the University of Oñate, where he became a professor. At this university, he taught Latin, classical Greek, Arabic, and Hebrew.

In 1901 the university was closed and Sáenz applied for a notary position, which he obtained in San Sebastián in 1903. From that moment on, he established his residence in the capital of San Sebastian until he died, although he was a tireless traveler and also spent long periods living in Paris. It is said that Sáenz was never seen without a book in his hand.

== Sporting career ==
Sáenz was a great fan of all types of sports, being a fencer. In 1906, he was one of the founders of Mundo Deportivo, Spain's first sports newspaper.

As a football fan, Sáenz was one of the founders of Sociedad de Football on 7 September 1909, and he was elected as the first president of the entity. A few months later, on 11 February 1910, King Alfonso XIII granted the new Society the title of Real ("Royal"), hence becoming Real Sociedad. In October 1909, he obtained the lands of Ondarreta from the Brunete house in order to build a stadium there, which was inaugurated in 1909, and which was also the first field built specifically to play football since previously the matches were played in the interior areas of hippodromes or velodromes.

Under his leadership, Real Sociedad had one first year of frenetic and successful activity. On 15 October 1909, just a month after the foundation of the club, Sáenz was already speaking, in a letter sent to the City Council of San Sebastián, of the invitation issued to participate in the inaugural edition of the Pyrenees Cup held in the South of France. They went on to reach the final, which they lost 1–2 to FC Barcelona on 1 May 1910. That same year, Sociedad, together with Madrid FC and Athletic Club, organized a parallel cup to the 1910 Copa del Rey, which is now currently recognized as official by the RFEF, in which they had to compete under a different name (since their club was not yet a year old as the tournament statutes required), doing so under the umbrella of another local club, Vasconia Sporting Club, and reached the final (UECF), which they lost 0–1 to Athletic Bilbao, courtesy of a goal from Remigio Iza.

Sociedad participated again in the 1912 Pyrenees Cup, but due to lack of funds they could not travel to Bordeaux to play the semifinal against Stade Bordelais who thus advanced on forfeit. Sáenz held the presidency of Sociedad for three years until 1912, when he was replaced by Enrique Pardiñas.

== Death ==
In the early 1960s, Sáenz gave an interview with the journalist José Javier Aranjuelo, next to a portrait of his son Roberto painted by Tyra Ekwall de Ullmann.

Sáenz died in 1964 in San Sebastián, at the age of either 88 or 89.
