= Enrique Pardiñas =

Spanish sailor, entrepreneur, and sports leader

- Born: Enrique Pardiñas y Barreiros; Unknown
- Died: August 1920
- Citizenship: Spanish
- Occupations: Sports leader; Sailor; Entrepreneur
- Known for: Second president of Real Sociedad

Second president of Real Sociedad
- In office 1912–1915
- Preceded by: Adolfo Sáenz
- Succeeded by: Antonio Vega de Seoane

1st president of UECF
- In office December 1912 – 5 February 1914

Enrique Pardiñas y Barreiros was a Spanish sailor and sports leader who served as the second president of Real Sociedad between 1912 and 1915, and as the first president Unión Española de Clubes de Fútbol (UECF), the forerunner federation of the current Royal Spanish Football Federation between 1912 and 1914.

== Sporting career ==
=== Athlete ===
At the end of the 19th century, Pardiñas was a member of the Spanish colonial administration of Cuba (acting secretary), and at the beginning of the 20th century, he was a member of San Sebastián's high society. He stood out in the sport of sailing, both as a sailor, winning the first edition of the Argentine Yacht Club Cup in 1908, but also as a skipper, federator, and mainly as commodore of the Real Club Náutico de San Sebastián, a position he still held when he died in 1920.

=== Presidencial mandates ===
In 1912, Pardiñas was appointed as the second president of Real Sociedad, replacing Adolfo Sáenz. As president of this club, he was one of the promoters and founders of the Unión Española de Clubes de Fútbol (UECF), a federation founded by the dissidents of the FECF, the current Royal Spanish Football Federation, following a disagreement about the venue of the 1913 Copa del Rey. He was elected president of this entity at the constitution assembly of this federation, held in San Sebastián at the end of December 1912. The Gipuzkoan teams joined it, with the notable exception of Racing de Irún, a part of the Catalans with FC Barcelona at the helm, and some clubs from other regions.

During 1913, a great rivalry arose between both federations, and two parallel Copa del Rey tournaments were held in March 1913, an "official", organized by FECF in Madrid, and an "unofficial", organized by the UECF in Barcelona. Pardiñas' personal friendship with Queen Victoria Eugenia made it possible for the queen to "donate" a Cup for the Copa del Rey sponsored by this federation, and likewise, Pardiñas managed to get King Alfonso XIII to grant the title of "Royal" to the UECF, before he did the same as compensation to the FECF. This royal recognition gave the UECF a certain prestige and made it a serious rival to the FECF, although the number of clubs affiliated with it was considerably smaller. In the Copa del Rey sponsored by the UECF, Real Sociedad, chaired by Pardiñas himself, faced FC Barcelona in a double match for the title, and after drawing in both games, FC Barcelona won in the final third tiebreaker match.

The UECF tried to gain recognition from FIFA by holding an international match against a French XI, held on 25 May 1913 at the Amute in Hondarribia, which ended in a 1–1 draw and which is now considered to have been the first-ever (unofficial) match of a Spanish national team. The UECF's attempt to affiliate with FIFA caused the international federation to issue an ultimatum to the two Spanish federations forcing them to merge if they wanted to be recognized by FIFA. During the summer of 1913, arduous negotiations were carried out between the two federations that finally led to the creation of several regional federations and the new Royal Spanish Football Federation in September 1913. The Royal Spanish Union of Clubs, although without activity since September, it was not officially dissolved until 5 February 1914. The RFEF recognized the title obtained by Barcelona in the UECF tournament as part of the Cup's record, as the 1913 UECF Copa del Rey.
