= Müzdat Yetkiner =

Turkish footballer (1922–1994)

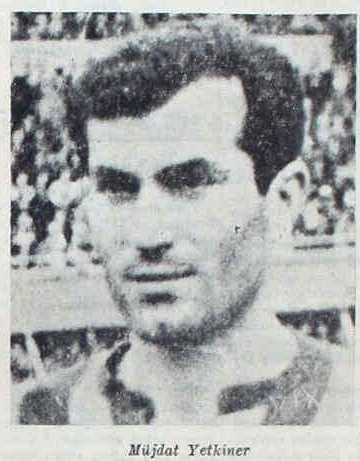
- Yetkiner in 1950

Personal information
- Date of birth: 1922
- Date of death: 23 November 1994 (aged 71–72)
- Position: Defender

Senior career*
Years	Team	Apps	(Gls)
- Fenerbahçe

International career
1950–1954	Turkey	8	(0)
- * Club domestic league appearances and goals

Müzdat Yetkiner (1922 – 23 November 1994) was a Turkish footballer who played as a defender for Fenerbahçe. He made eight appearances for the Turkey national team from 1950 to 1954. He was also part of Turkey's team for their qualification matches for the 1954 FIFA World Cup.
