= Imanol Alguacil =

Spanish football manager (born 1971)

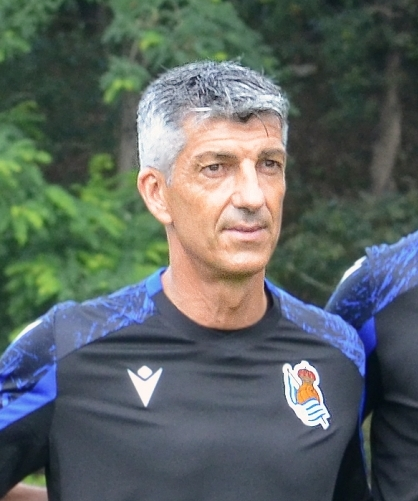
- Alguacil with Real Sociedad in 2021

Personal information
- Full name: Imanol Alguacil Barrenetxea
- Date of birth: 4 July 1971 (age 55)
- Place of birth: Orio, Spain
- Height: 1.87 m (6 ft 2 in)
- Position: Right-back

Team information
- Current team: Olympiacos (manager)

Youth career
- Orioko FT
- 1988–1989: Real Sociedad

Senior career*
Years	Team	Apps	(Gls)
1989–1991	Real Sociedad B	56	(1)
1990–1998	Real Sociedad	113	(7)
1998–2000	Villarreal	29	(1)
2000–2001	Jaén	30	(0)
2001–2002	Cartagena	15	(0)
2002–2003	Burgos	20	(1)
Total		263	(10)

International career
1994–1997	Basque Country	3	(0)

Managerial career
- 2011–2013: Real Sociedad (youth)
- 2013–2014: Real Sociedad B (assistant)
- 2014–2018: Real Sociedad B
- 2018: Real Sociedad (interim)
- 2018: Real Sociedad B
- 2018–2025: Real Sociedad
- 2025–2026: Al Shabab
- 2026–: Olympiacos
- * Club domestic league appearances and goals

Imanol Alguacil Barrenetxea (born 4 July 1971), known simply as Imanol as a player, is a Spanish former professional footballer who played as a right-back. He is currently manager of Super League Greece club Olympiacos.

He made 121 appearances in La Liga over nine seasons, scoring eight goals while representing Real Sociedad and Villarreal. In 2014, he started working as a manager, with a four-year spell with Real Sociedad B. He briefly coached the club's senior team in spring 2018, and returned to take full charge in the winter of the same year.

== Playing career ==
Born in Orio, Gipuzkoa, Basque Country, Imanol was a Real Sociedad youth graduate. He made his senior debut with the reserves, spending two full seasons in the Segunda División B.

On 29 September 1990, Imanol made his first-team – and La Liga – debut, playing the full 90 minutes in a 2–1 away loss against Real Oviedo. He was promoted to the main squad in the summer of 1991, featuring regularly during the following campaigns.

Imanol scored his first professional goal on 20 September 1992, tying an eventual 2–1 away win over Albacete. He was used rarely in the final years of his stint at the Anoeta Stadium as he dealt with several injury problems, leaving the club in 1998 after playing only four matches during the season.

In the 1998 off-season, Imanol joined Villarreal also of the top division, appearing sparingly in his first year and suffering relegation. After returning to the top flight in 2000, he was released, and moved to Segunda División's Real Jaén.

Imanol then resumed his career in the third tier, representing Cartagena and Burgos. He retired with the latter side in 2003, aged 32.

== Coaching career ==
On 26 July 2011, Alguacil returned to his first club Real Sociedad, being appointed manager of the youth setup. On 17 June 2013 he was named reserve team coach Asier Santana's assistant, and was also in charge of the main squad along with Santana in November 2014 following Jagoba Arrasate's dismissal.

After the arrival of David Moyes in November 2014, Alguacil was included in the first team staff, but he was appointed manager of the B side later that month. On 19 March 2018, he replaced the fired Eusebio Sacristán at the helm of the main squad until the end of the season.

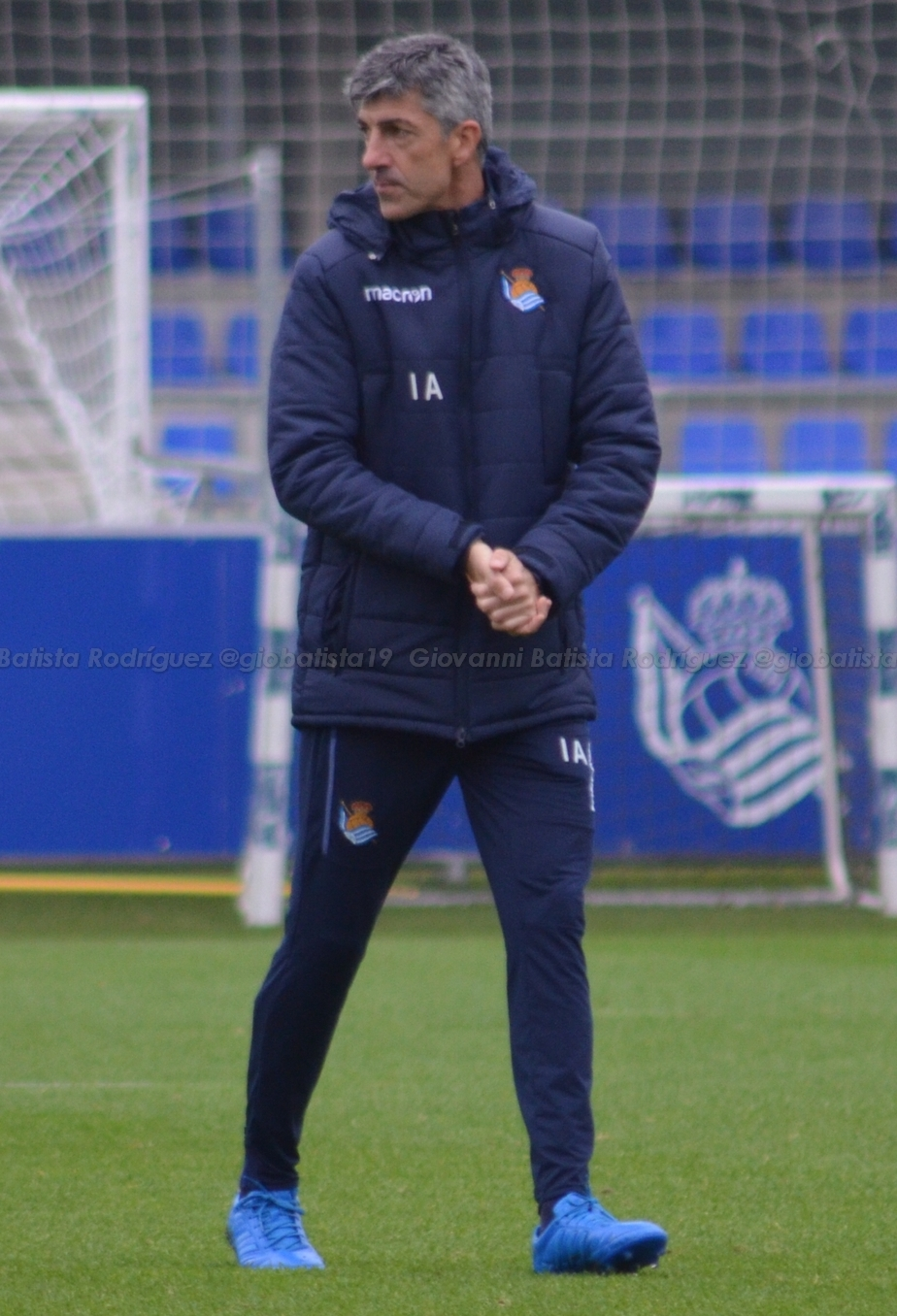
Alguacil training with Real Sociedad in 2018

In the summer of 2018, Alguacil returned to the reserves and Asier Garitano took over the senior role, but in December of the same year the latter was dismissed following a poor sequence of results and the former again became the first team coach. Following a strong start to the 2019–20 campaign, he was given a one-year contract extension.

Alguacil led Real to their first trophy since 1987 on 3 April 2021, with a 1–0 victory against Basque rivals Athletic Bilbao in the 2020 Copa del Rey final (postponed due to the COVID-19 pandemic). In the post-match press conference, he celebrated by putting on a team jersey and scarf and chanting in joy.

On 14 November 2022, Alguacil extended his contract to 2025. The following 17 January, with a 1–0 home win over Mallorca in the last 16 of the cup, he reached 100 victories for Real in 205 games; a club record nine-match winning streak ended in the next round with a 1–0 loss at Barcelona. With a fourth-place finish, he secured a fourth consecutive European season, and the side's first in the UEFA Champions League for a decade.

On 24 April 2025, Alguacil announced that he would leave the Anoeta Stadium at the end of the season. On 3 July, he was appointed at Saudi Pro League's Al Shabab Club, parting ways by mutual consent in February 2026 following a series of poor results.

Alguacil became head coach of Super League Greece club Olympiacos on 10 September 2026, taking over from his compatriot José Luis Mendilibar.

== Managerial statistics ==
As of match played 22 November 2026

Managerial record by team and tenure
Team	Nat.	From	To	Record								Ref
Team	Nat.	From	To	G	W	D	L	GF	GA	GD	Win %	Ref
Real Sociedad B	(Spain)	28 November 2014	19 March 2018	130	52	40	38	176	146	+30	40.00	
Real Sociedad	(Spain)	19 March 2018	24 May 2018	9	5	1	3	15	7	+8	55.56	
Real Sociedad B	(Spain)	27 May 2018	26 December 2018	18	6	5	7	23	20	+3	33.33	
Real Sociedad	(Spain)	26 December 2018	30 May 2025	330	153	84	93	455	342	+113	46.36	
Al Shabab	(Saudi Arabia)	3 July 2025	17 February 2026	28	5	12	11	30	42	−12	17.86	
Olympiacos	(Greece)	10 September 2026	present	13	10	2	1	25	7	+18	76.92	
Total				528	231	144	153	724	564	+160	43.75	—

== Honours ==
=== Manager ===
Real Sociedad

- Copa del Rey: 2019–20

Individual

- Miguel Muñoz Trophy: 2022–23
