= 1954 FIFA World Cup qualification Group 6 =

Football tournament qualifying stage

The 1954 FIFA World Cup qualification Group 6 contained Spain and Turkey.

== Table ==
Rank	Team	Pts	Pld	W	D	L	GF	GA	GD
1=	Spain	2	2	1	0	1	4	2	+2
1=	Turkey	2	2	1	0	1	2	4	−2

== Matches ==
6 January 1954	Spain	4 – 1	Turkey	Madrid, Spain
	Venancio 13'; Gaínza 48'; Alsua 65'; González 49'	Report	Recep 31'	Stadium: Estadio Nuevo Chamartín; Referee: Vincentini (France)

14 March 1954	Turkey	1 – 0	Spain	Istanbul, Turkey
	Burhan 16'	Report		Stadium: Mithat Paşa Stadium; Referee: Schmetzer (Germany)

Spain and Turkey finished level on points, and a play-off on neutral ground was played to decide who would qualify.

17 March 1954	Turkey	2 – 2 (a.e.t.)	Spain	Rome, Italy
	Burhan 25'; Suat 64'	Report	Arteche 11'; Escudero 78'	Stadium: Stadio Olimpico; Referee: Bernardi (Italy)

Turkey qualified after drawing lots. A 14-year-old local boy whose father worked at the stadium, Luigi Franco Gemma, picked Turkey's name from the lots with his eyes blindfolded.

== Team stats ==
=== Turkey ===
Head coach: (Italy) Sandro Puppo

Pos.	Player	DoB	Games played	Goals	Minutes played	Sub off	Sub on	(Spain)	(Spain)	(Spain)	Club
MF	Recep Adanır	3 May 1929	1	1	90	0	0	90	–	–	(Turkey) Beşiktaş J.K.
DF	Rıdvan Bolatlı	2 December 1928	2	0	210	0	0	–	90	120	(Turkey) Ankaragücü
FW	Feridun Buğeker	5 April 1933	2	0	210	0	0	–	90	120	(Turkey) Fenerbahçe S.K.
FW	Fahrettin Cansever	1930	1	0	90	0	0	90	–	–	(Turkey) Beşiktaş J.K.
DF	Basri Dirimlili	7 June 1929	2	0	210	0	0	–	90	120	(Turkey) Fenerbahçe S.K.
DF	Bülent Eken	26 October 1923	1	0	90	0	0	90	–	–	(Turkey) Galatasaray S.K.
GK	Şükrü Ersoy	14 January 1934	2	0	165	0	0	90	–	75	(Turkey) Ankaragücü
DF	Mustafa Ertan	21 April 1926	2	0	210	0	0	–	90	120	(Turkey) Ankaragücü
MF	Rober Eryol	21 December 1930	3	0	300	0	0	90	90	120	(Turkey) Galatasaray S.K.
MF	Mehmet Ali Has		1	0	90	0	0	90	–	–	(Turkey) Fenerbahçe S.K.
MF	Ali İhsan Karayiğit	1927	1	0	90	0	0	90	–	–	(Turkey) Beşiktaş J.K.
FW	Lefter Küçükandonyadis	22 December 1925	3	0	300	0	0	90	90	120	(Turkey) Fenerbahçe S.K.
FW	Suat Mamat	8 November 1930	2	1	180	0	0	–	90	120	(Turkey) Galatasaray S.K.
DF	Eşref Özmenç	1930	1	0	90	0	0	90	–	–	(Turkey) Beşiktaş J.K.
FW	Burhan Sargın	11 February 1929	3	2	300	0	0	90	90	120	(Turkey) Fenerbahçe S.K.
GK	Turgay Şeren (c)	15 May 1932	2	0	135	1	0	–	90	45	(Turkey) Galatasaray S.K.
FW	Coşkun Taş	23 April 1935	2	0	210	0	0	–	90	120	(Turkey) Beşiktaş J.K.
MF	Müzdat Yetkiner (c)		1	0	90	0	0	90	–	–	(Turkey) Fenerbahçe S.K.
MF	Çetin Zeybek	12 September 1932	2	0	210	0	0	–	90	120	(Turkey) Kasımpaşa S.K.

=== Spain ===
Head coach: (Spain) Luis Iribarren

Pos.	Player	DoB	Games played	Goals	Minutes played	Sub off	Sub on	(Turkey)	(Turkey)	(Turkey)	Club
FW	Rafael Alsua	18 August 1923	2	1	180	0	0	90	90	–	(Spain) Racing de Santander
GK	Fernando Argila	26 December 1922	1	0	90	0	0	90	–	–	(Spain) Real Oviedo
FW	José Luis Arteche	28 June 1930	1	1	120	0	0	–	–	120	(Spain) Athletic Bilbao
DF	Gustau Biosca	29 February 1928	2	0	210	0	0	–	90	120	(Spain) FC Barcelona
MF	Andreu Bosch	22 April 1931	1	0	90	0	0	90	–	–	(Spain) FC Barcelona
DF	Campanal	13 February 1931	3	0	300	0	0	90	90	120	(Spain) Sevilla FC
GK	Carmelo	6 December 1930	2	0	210	0	0	–	90	120	(Spain) Athletic Bilbao
FW	Adrián Escudero	24 November 1927	1	1	120	0	0	–	–	120	(Spain) Atlético Madrid
FW	Agustín Gaínza (c)	28 May 1922	2	1	210	0	0	90	–	120	(Spain) Athletic Bilbao
MF	Mariano Gonzalvo	22 March 1922	1	0	120	0	0	–	–	120	(Spain) FC Barcelona
FW	Ladislao Kubala	10 June 1927	1	0	90	0	0	–	90	–	(Spain) FC Barcelona
DF	Francisco Lesmes	4 March 1924	1	0	90	0	0	90	–	–	(Spain) Real Valladolid
FW	Eduardo Manchón	24 July 1930	1	0	90	0	0	–	90	–	(Spain) FC Barcelona
FW	Miguel	27 April 1927	2	1	180	0	0	90	90	–	(Spain) Atlético Madrid
FW	Pasieguito	21 May 1925	3	0	300	0	0	90	90	120	(Spain) Valencia CF
MF	Antonio Puchades (vc)	4 June 1925	3	0	300	0	0	90	90	120	(Spain) Valencia CF
DF	Joan Segarra	15 November 1927	3	0	300	0	0	90	90	120	(Spain) FC Barcelona
MF	Venancio	22 April 1921	3	1	300	0	0	90	90	120	(Spain) Athletic Bilbao
