= Andreu Bosch =

Spanish footballer

Personal information
- Full name: Andreu Bosch i Pujol
- Date of birth: 22 February 1931
- Place of birth: Barcelona, Spain
- Date of death: 17 December 2004 (aged 73)
- Position: Midfielder

International career
Years	Team	Apps	(Gls)
1953–1955	Spain	6	(0)

Andreu Bosch (22 February 1931 – 17 December 2004) was a Spanish footballer. He played in six matches for the Spain national football team from 1953 to 1955. He was also named in Spain's squad for the Group 6 qualification tournament for the 1954 FIFA World Cup.
