= José Caeiro =

Spanish footballer

Personal information
- Full name: José Valentín Caeiro Igós
- Date of birth: 14 February 1925
- Place of birth: Hondarribia, Spain
- Date of death: 14 January 1981 (aged 55)
- Place of death: Ferrol, Spain
- Position: Forward

Senior career*
Years	Team	Apps	(Gls)
- Fuenterrabía
- Karizpe
1945–1948	Racing Ferrol		
1948–1951	Real Sociedad	86	(56)
1951–1952	Valencia	9	(0)
1952–1953	Hércules	24	(16)
1953–1957	Rennes	114	(72)
1957–1958	Brestoise		
1958–1959	Racing Ferrol	8	(2)
Total		240	(146)

Managerial career
- 1969–1971: Racing Ferrol
- 1972–1973: Pontevedra
- 1974–1975: Jaén
- 1976–1977: Racing Ferrol
- 1977–1980: Ponferradina
- 1980–1981: Arosa
- * Club domestic league appearances and goals

José Valentín Caeiro Igós (14 February 1925 – 14 January 1981) was a Spanish retired footballer who played as a forward, and a former manager.

== Playing career ==
Caeiro was born in Hondarribia, Gipuzkoa, Basque Country. His first professional club was Segunda División's Racing de Ferrol, where he joined in 1945.

In 1948 Caeiro moved to fellow league team Real Sociedad, and scored an impressive 26 goals in 38 matches during his first season, which ended in promotion to La Liga. In the 1950–51 campaign he contributed with 17 goals in only 24 matches; this prompted a move to Valencia CF also in the top tier.

After being rarely used by the Valencians, Caeiro signed for neighbouring Hércules CF in 1953. After being again essential (16 goals in 24 outings), he moved abroad and signed for Stade Rennais FC.

Caeiro contributed to Rennes' top flight promotion in 1956 with 17 goals, but appeared sparingly during the following season. In 1958 he returned to Racing Ferrol after a short spell at AS Brestoise, and retired the following year, aged 33.

== Managerial career ==
Caeiro was in charge of Racing de Ferrol for two full campaigns, both in the second level. He was subsequently appointed manager of Pontevedra CF, but left the club after suffering relegation.

Caeiro was subsequently in charge of Real Jaén, SD Ponferradina and Arosa SC.

== Death ==
On 14 January 1981, Caeiro died after suffering a heart attack, aged 55. He was still in charge of Arosa during that time.

== Honours ==
Real Sociedad

- Segunda División: 1948–49

Rennes

- Ligue 2: 1955–56
