= Andoni Elizondo =

Spanish footballer and coach

Personal information
- Full name: Andoni Elizondo Mendiola
- Date of birth: 5 August 1932
- Place of birth: San Sebastián, Spain
- Date of death: 23 February 1986 (aged 53)
- Place of death: San Sebastián, Spain
- Position: Defender

Senior career*
Years	Team	Apps	(Gls)
1952–1964	Real Sociedad	241	

Managerial career
- 1966–1970: Real Sociedad
- 1971–1972: Real Sociedad
- 1974–1976: Real Sociedad
- 1979: Basque Country
- * Club domestic league appearances and goals

Andoni Elizondo Mendiola (5 August 1932 - 23 February 1986) was a Spanish football defender and coach.

== Playing career ==
A product of the academy system, he played for Real Sociedad between 1952 and 1964. His last two seasons were in the second level after suffering relegation in 1962. Elizondo played a total of 241 matches for Real Sociedad. He played a single game for his national team's B side in 1958 against Portugal.

== Coaching career ==
It was Elizondo himself who took Real Sociedad up in his first year in charge as a manager. Elizondo intermittently managed the club over the span of a decade that transformed the club. Under his reign Real Sociedad stabilized in the top division and played in the Uefa cup twice, in his last two seasons. This was the first time in the club's history it played in a European competition. He also took Real Sociedad to the semifinals of the Copa del Generalísimo twice, in 1969 and 1976. Elizondo coached the team for a total of 234 matches.

He was part of a managing team that in 1979 led the Basque Country in a friendly against Ireland.

His brother, Joseba, managed Real sociedad in 1961.

== Honours ==
=== Manager ===
Real Sociedad

- Segunda División: 1966–67
