= Agustín Eizaguirre =

Spanish footballer

Personal information
- Full name: Agustín Eizaguirre Ostolaza
- Date of birth: 7 October 1897
- Place of birth: Zarautz, Spain
- Date of death: 28 November 1961 (aged 64)
- Place of death: San Sebastián, Spain
- Position: Goalkeeper

Senior career*
Years	Team	Apps	(Gls)
1912–1925	Real Sociedad	70	(0)
Medal record
Men's football
Representing Spain
Olympic Games
Silver medal – second place	1920 Antwerp	Team competition
- * Club domestic league appearances and goals

Agustín Eizaguirre Ostolaza (7 October 1897 – 28 November 1961) was a Spanish footballer who played as a goalkeeper. He competed in the football tournament of the 1920 Summer Olympics with the Spain team winning the silver medal without making an appearance. At club level, he played for Real Sociedad.

== Career ==
Eizaguirre was born in Zarautz in 1897. He was a Real Sociedad goalkeeper from 1912 to 1925, making 70 appearances. He played in the inaugural match at Atotxa Stadium in October 1913. With the Union of Clubs, one of two competing football federations in Spain at the time, he played in an international match against France in 1913. In 1920, he participated at the 1920 Summer Olympics with the Spain team without making an appearance. He retired at the age of 28.

== After football ==
After his retirement from playing, Eizaguirre set up a sports equipment store.

== Personal life and death ==
Eizaguirre's son Ignacio was also a football goalkeeper and played for the Spain national team.
