= Antonio Aldonza =

Spanish footballer (1926–2014)

Aldonza
Personal information
- Full name: Antonio Aldonza Lobato
- Date of birth: 21 January 1926
- Place of birth: Leioa, Spain
- Date of death: 11 April 2014 (aged 88)
- Position: Left back

Youth career
- Arenas Club

Senior career*
Years	Team	Apps	(Gls)
1945–1949	Athletic Bilbao	8	(0)
1945–1947	→ Arenas Club (loan)		
1950–1953	Real Sociedad	21	(0)
Total		29	(0)
- * Club domestic league appearances and goals

Antonio Aldonza Lobato, known as Aldonza (21 January 1926 – 11 April 2014) was a Spanish professional footballer who played as a left back.

== Career ==
Born in Leioa, Aldonza played for Arenas Club, Athletic Bilbao and Real Sociedad.
