= José Ramón Eizmendi =

Spanish footballer and manager

Personal information
- Full name: José Ramón Eizmendi Urdangarín
- Date of birth: 29 August 1960 (age 66)
- Place of birth: Ikaztegieta, Spain
- Height: 1.79 m (5 ft 10 1/2 in)
- Position: Midfielder

Youth career
- Real Sociedad

Senior career*
Years	Team	Apps	(Gls)
1978–1983	San Sebastián	130	(29)
1982	Real Sociedad	1	(0)
1983–1985	Tenerife	36	(1)
1985–1987	Oviedo	72	(1)
1987–1991	Xerez	132	(6)
1991–1993	Beasain	9	(1)
Total		380	(38)

Managerial career
- 1999–2000: Real Unión
- 2004–2005: Real Sociedad (youth)
- 2005–2006: Real Sociedad B (assistant)
- 2006–2008: Real Sociedad B
- 2008: Real Sociedad
- 2008: Real Sociedad B
- 2009–2010: Numancia (assistant)
- 2010: Tenerife (assistant)
- * Club domestic league appearances and goals

José Ramón Eizmendi Urdangarín (born 29 August 1960 in Ikaztegieta, Gipuzkoa) is a Spanish retired football midfielder and manager. His brother Francisco and nephews Alain and Eneko were also footballers.
