= Ángel Paz =

Ángel Paz may refer to:

- Ángel Paz (Honduran footballer) (1950–2008)
- Ángel Paz (Spanish footballer) (1932–2025)
