= Rafael Alsua =

Spanish footballer

Personal information
- Full name: Rafael Alsúa Alonso
- Date of birth: 18 August 1923
- Place of birth: Irún, Gipuzkoa, Spain
- Date of death: 30 November 1992 (aged 69)
- Position: Forward

International career
Years	Team	Apps	(Gls)
1954	Spain	2	(1)

Rafael Alsua (18 August 1923 – 30 November 1992) was a Spanish footballer. He played in two matches for the Spain national football team in 1954. He was also named in Spain's squad for the Group 6 qualification tournament for the 1954 FIFA World Cup.
