= Asier Garitano =

Spanish football manager (born 1969)

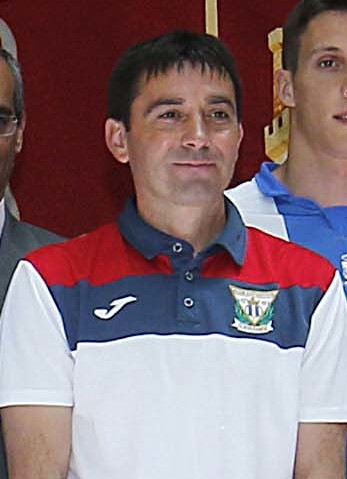
- Garitano as Leganés manager in 2016

Personal information
- Full name: Asier Garitano Aguirrezábal
- Date of birth: 6 December 1969 (age 56)
- Place of birth: Bergara, Spain
- Height: 1.72 m (5 ft 8 in)
- Position: Forward

Youth career
- 1988–1989: Athletic Bilbao

Senior career*
| Years | Team | Apps | (Gls) |
| 1989–1993 | Bilbao Athletic | 95 | (17) |
| 1992–1993 | → Eibar (loan) | 22 | (4) |
| 1993–1994 | Cartagena | 35 | (13) |
| 1994–1995 | Cádiz | 41 | (9) |
| 1996 | Eibar | 17 | (2) |
| 1996–1997 | Gavà | 29 | (6) |
| 1997–1998 | Racing Ferrol | 13 | (3) |
| 1998–2000 | Burgos | 58 | (19) |
| 2000–2003 | Alicante | 40 | (12) |
| 2002–2003 | → Benidorm (loan) | 2 | (0) |
| Total | | 352 | (85) |

International career
| 1988 | Spain U18 | 1 | (0) |
| 1990 | Spain U20 | 1 | (0) |

Managerial career
- 2003–2008: Alicante (assistant)
- 2008: Alicante
- 2009–2010: Castellón (assistant)
- 2010: Castellón
- 2011–2012: Orihuela
- 2012–2013: Alcoyano
- 2013–2018: Leganés
- 2018: Real Sociedad
- 2019–2020: Alavés
- 2021: Leganés
- 2023–2024: Tenerife
- 2025: Sporting Gijón
- * Club domestic league appearances and goals

Asier Garitano Aguirrezábal (born 6 December 1969) is a Spanish football manager and former player who played as a forward.

During a 14-year senior career, he appeared in 134 matches in the Segunda División over five seasons, totalling 23 goals for Bilbao Athletic and Eibar. He added 216 games and 61 goals in the Segunda División B, in representation of several clubs.

Garitano started working as a manager in 2003, as an assistant at Alicante. He went on to be in charge of four teams before being appointed at Leganés in 2013, which he led to promotions to the second tier and La Liga. He was head coach at Real Sociedad and Alavés, also in the top flight.

== Playing career ==
Born in Bergara, Gipuzkoa, Basque Country, Garitano was an Athletic Bilbao youth graduate. He made his senior debut with the reserves on 2 September 1989, starting and scoring the winner in a 2–1 away win against Racing de Santander in the Segunda División.

After four full seasons (one of them on loan at SD Eibar), Garitano left the Lions and signed for Cartagena FC of Segunda División B. In 1994, he moved to Cádiz CF also in the third division, and returned to Eibar in January 1996.

Garitano subsequently resumed his career in the third tier and Tercera División, representing CF Gavà, Racing de Ferrol, Burgos CF, Alicante CF and Benidorm CF. He retired in 2003 at the age of 33, mainly due to injuries.

== Coaching career ==
Shortly after retiring, Garitano started working as an assistant at former club Alicante. In October 2008 he was named manager, replacing the fired José Carlos Granero. However, after only three matches, he was replaced by Nino Lema and moved to the backroom staff.

Garitano was appointed CD Castellón coach on 6 April 2010, after being previously working at the club as an assistant. He remained in charge until the end of the season, suffering relegation as last.

On 7 July 2011, Garitano signed with third division side Orihuela CF. The following campaign, also as manager, he worked with CD Alcoyano, eventually losing promotion with both teams in the play-offs.

On 28 June 2013, Garitano joined CD Leganés still in the third tier. In his first season, he achieved promotion to division two after defeating CE L'Hospitalet in the play-offs; another promotion followed in 2016, finishing second in the regular season.

On 24 May 2018, Garitano was appointed at the helm of Real Sociedad. On 26 December that year, he was dismissed due to a poor run of results.

Garitano became manager of Deportivo Alavés on 21 May 2019, taking over from Abelardo who had resigned a day earlier. He was fired in July 2020, after five consecutive defeats.

On 27 January 2021, Garitano returned to Leganés, with the club back in the second division. He was sacked on 30 October, leaving the side in the relegation zone.

On 29 May 2023, after more than a year without coaching, Garitano replaced Luis Miguel Ramis at fellow second-tier CD Tenerife. He left in June 2024, after a 12th-place finish.

On 8 April 2025, Garitano took over from the sacked Rubén Albés at relegation-threatened Sporting de Gijón; he signed a contract valid until 30 June 2026. He managed to easily avoid a drop, ranking 11th with 56 points, but was dismissed on 5 October after five consecutive losses in the new campaign.

== Personal life ==
Garitano was not related to fellow manager Gaizka Garitano, who also had playing spells with Bilbao Athletic and Eibar.

== Managerial statistics ==
As of match played 5 October 2025

Managerial record by team and tenure
| Team | Nat | From | To | Record | | | | | | | | Ref |
| Team | Nat | From | To | G | W | D | L | GF | GA | GD | Win % | Ref |
|---|---|---|---|---|---|---|---|---|---|---|---|---|
| Alicante | (Spain) | 13 October 2008 | 3 November 2008 | 3 | 0 | 2 | 1 | 3 | 4 | −1 | 0.00 | |
| Castellón | (Spain) | 6 April 2010 | 30 June 2010 | 11 | 2 | 3 | 6 | 9 | 14 | −5 | 18.18 | |
| Orihuela | (Spain) | 7 July 2011 | 14 June 2012 | 42 | 19 | 15 | 8 | 53 | 38 | +15 | 45.24 | |
| Alcoyano | (Spain) | 14 June 2012 | 25 March 2013 | 36 | 18 | 7 | 11 | 46 | 34 | +12 | 50.00 | |
| Leganés | (Spain) | 28 June 2013 | 20 May 2018 | 222 | 87 | 59 | 76 | 261 | 226 | +35 | 39.19 | |
| Real Sociedad | (Spain) | 24 May 2018 | 26 December 2018 | 19 | 6 | 5 | 8 | 21 | 21 | +0 | 31.58 | |
| Alavés | (Spain) | 21 May 2019 | 5 July 2020 | 35 | 9 | 8 | 18 | 33 | 54 | −21 | 25.71 | |
| Leganés | (Spain) | 27 January 2021 | 30 October 2021 | 36 | 13 | 10 | 13 | 44 | 39 | +5 | 36.11 | |
| Tenerife | (Spain) | 29 May 2023 | 2 June 2024 | 46 | 18 | 11 | 17 | 44 | 44 | +0 | 39.13 | |
| Sporting Gijón | (Spain) | 8 April 2025 | 5 October 2025 | 16 | 8 | 0 | 8 | 27 | 26 | +1 | 50.00 | |
| Total | | | | 466 | 180 | 120 | 166 | 541 | 499 | +42 | 38.63 | — |
