= Sebastián Ontoria =

Spanish footballer

Personal information
- Full name: Sebastián Ontoria Escolaza
- Date of birth: 20 January 1920
- Place of birth: San Sebastián, Spain
- Date of death: 12 August 2004 (aged 84)
- Place of death: San Sebastián, Spain
- Height: 1.68 m (5 ft 6 in)
- Position: Midfielder

Youth career
- Amara
- Lagun Artea
- Sporting Rentería
- Vasconia

Senior career*
| Years | Team | Apps | (Gls) |
| 1939–1940 | Casetas | | |
| 1940–1941 | Zaragoza | 7 | (0) |
| 1941–1955 | Real Sociedad | 315 | (96) |
| 1955–1956 | Indautxu | 25 | (5) |
| 1956–1957 | Barakaldo | 16 | (4) |
| Total | | 363 | (105) |

International career
| 1949 | Spain B | 1 | (1) |
| 1950 | Spain | 1 | (0) |
- * Club domestic league appearances and goals

Sebastián Ontoria Escolaza (20 January 1920 – 12 August 2004) was a Spanish footballer who played as a midfielder.

He amassed La Liga totals of 213 games and 41 goals during 11 seasons, with Zaragoza and Real Sociedad.

== Club career ==
Born in San Sebastián, Gipuzkoa, Ontoria started his professional career with Real Zaragoza, appearing in only seven La Liga matches in his first two seasons combined and being relegated in the second. He then signed with his hometown club Real Sociedad after returning from his exile due to the Spanish Civil War, meeting the same fate in 1942, 1944 and 1948.

Ontoria started playing as a forward, but coach Benito Díaz eventually reconverted him into a midfielder whilst naming him team captain. During his 14-year spell at the Atotxa Stadium, he scored 114 goals across all competitions in 374 games, also reaching the final of the 1951 Copa del Generalísimo, lost to FC Barcelona.

Ontoria retired in 1957 at the age of 37, after one-year Segunda División stints with SD Indautxu and Barakaldo CF. He died in San Sebastián on 12 August 2004, aged 84.

== International career ==
Ontoria earned one cap for Spain: on 9 April 1950, he helped to a 2–2 away draw to Portugal for the 1950 FIFA World Cup qualifiers, that after the 5–1 win in Madrid earned the nation a ticket to the finals in Brazil.

== Personal life ==
At the end of the Civil War, Ontoria was captured and imprisoned in a concentration camp in Zaragoza for two years, after enlisting in the Larrañaga communist battalion in the Basque army, in the early days of the uprising.
