= José Antonio Irulegui =

Spanish footballer and manager

Personal information
- Full name: José Antonio Irulegui Garmendia
- Date of birth: 1 April 1937 (age 89)
- Place of birth: Lasarte, Spain
- Height: 1.75 m (5 ft 9 in)
- Position: Defender

Youth career
- Real Sociedad

Senior career*
Years	Team	Apps	(Gls)
1955–1956	Eibar	15	(0)
1956–1965	Real Sociedad	177	(1)
1965–1971	Pontevedra	142	(0)
1971–1972	Murcia		
Total		334	(1)

International career
1959	Spain U21	1	(0)

Managerial career
- 1974–1975: Deportivo La Coruña
- 1976–1978: Real Sociedad
- 1978–1979: Español
- 1980–1981: Murcia
- 1985–1987: Real Burgos
- 1987–1990: Xerez
- 1990–1991: Levante
- 1993–1994: Alavés
- 1995: Mallorca
- 1997–1999: Villarreal
- * Club domestic league appearances and goals

José Antonio Irulegui Garmendia (born 1 April 1937) is a Spanish former football defender and manager.

== Playing career ==
Born in Lasarte-Oria, Gipuzkoa, Basque Country, Irulegui played professional football with SD Eibar, Real Sociedad and Pontevedra CF, in a career that lasted 16 years. He amassed La Liga totals of 249 matches and one goal over 11 seasons.

Irulegui left the Galician club in June 1971 at the age of 34, after one final campaign in the Segunda División. He retired after one year with Tercera División side Real Murcia CF.

== Coaching career ==
Irulegui worked as a manager for nearly three decades, starting with second-tier Deportivo de La Coruña in 1973–74 (only five games in charge, team relegation followed by immediate promotion). He went on to coach Real Sociedad, RCD Español, Murcia, Real Burgos CF, Xerez CD, Levante UD, Deportivo Alavés, RCD Mallorca and Villarreal CF.

Irulegui led the last of those clubs to promotion to the top flight in the 1997–98 season, in the playoffs. He was relieved of his duties late into the following campaign, which ended in immediate relegation.
