= Benito Díaz =

Spanish footballer and manager

Personal information
- Full name: Don Benito Díaz Iraola
- Date of birth: 17 July 1898
- Place of birth: San Sebastián, Spain
- Date of death: 1 April 1990 (aged 91)
- Place of death: San Sebastián, Spain
- Position: Striker

Senior career*
Years	Team	Apps	(Gls)
- Fortuna
1917–1927	Real Sociedad		

Managerial career
- 1926–1930: Real Sociedad
- 1937–1942: Bordeaux
- 1942–1951: Real Sociedad
- 1953–1954: Atlético Madrid
- * Club domestic league appearances and goals

Don Benito Díaz Iraola (17 July 1898 – 1 April 1990) was a Spanish football manager and player.

He played mainly for Real Sociedad.

He coached Real Sociedad, Bordeaux and Atlético Madrid.
