= Real Sociedad =

Spanish sports club

- Full name: Real Sociedad de Fútbol, S.A.D.
- Nicknames: Txuri-Urdin (The White-and-Blues); La Real / Reala / Erreala
- Founded: 7 September 1909; 117 years ago as Sociedad de Foot-Ball de San Sebastián
- Stadium: Reale Arena
- Capacity: 40,000
- President: Jokin Aperribay
- Head coach: Pellegrino Matarazzo
- League: La Liga
- 2025–26: La Liga, 10th of 20
- Website: realsociedad.eus
Home colours	Away colours	Third colours

Real Sociedad de Fútbol, S.A.D., commonly known as La Real or Real Sociedad (pronounced [reˈal soθjeˈðað] es; lit. 'Royal Society') in English and Erreala or Reala in Basque, is a Spanish professional sports club based in the city of San Sebastián, Basque Country. The club was founded on 7 September 1909 and is best known for its football team, which plays home matches at the 40,000-capacity Anoeta Stadium.

Real Sociedad won the Liga title in 1980–81 and 1981–82, and finished runner-up in 1979–80, 1987–88, and 2002–03. The club has also won the Copa del Rey four times, in 1909, 1987, 2020, and 2026, and the Spanish Super Cup once, in 1982. It contests the Basque derby against rivals Athletic Bilbao. Real Sociedad was a founding member of La Liga in 1929; its longest spell in the top flight was for 40 seasons, from 1967 to 2007. The club has competed in the European Cup / UEFA Champions League five times, between the 1981–82 and 2023–24 editions.

Traditionally the club followed a policy (similar to that of its rival Athletic) of signing only Basque players, before signing Irish forward John Aldridge in 1989. While a strong Basque contingent has been retained among its players, nowadays both non-Basque Spaniards and foreign players are represented at the club. Its youth academy subsequent to the all-Basque era has still been very successful in developing internationally renowned players, including World Cup winners Xabi Alonso, Antoine Griezmann, Mikel Oyarzabal and Martin Zubimendi.

Aside from football (including a women's team), Real Sociedad also has several sections in other sports, including track and field, field hockey, and Basque pelota.

== History ==
=== Early history ===
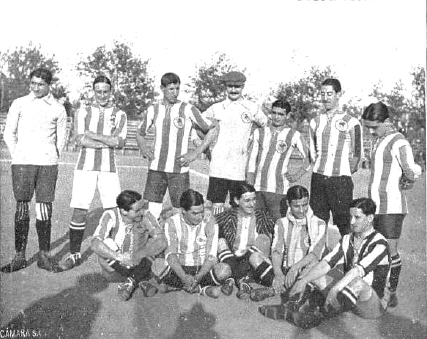
Real Sociedad in 1912

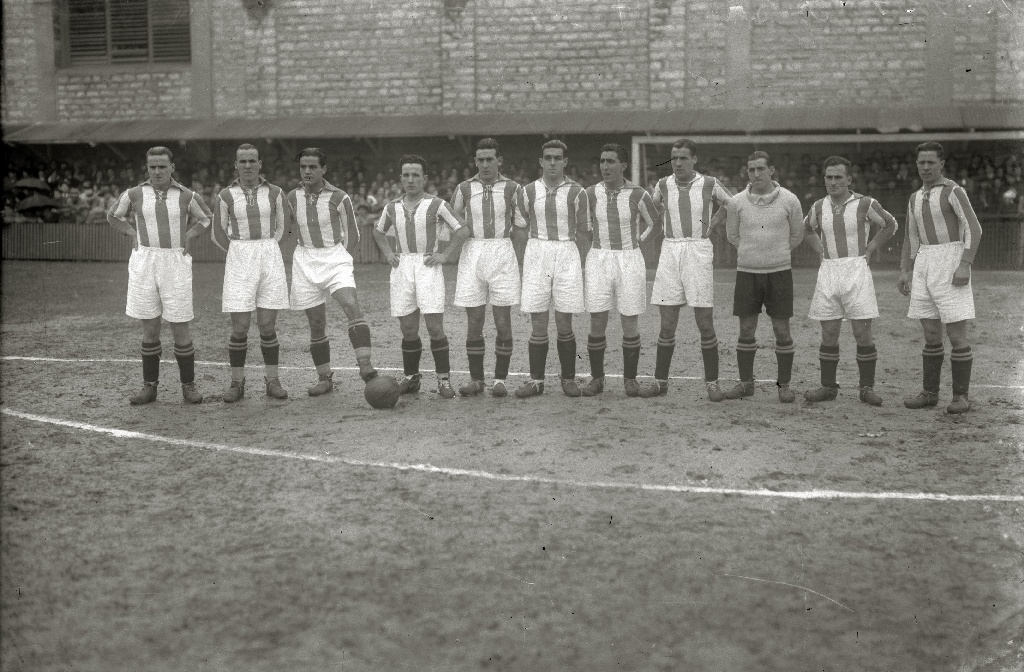
Real Sociedad squad in the 1930–31 league season

Football was introduced to San Sebastián in the early 1900s by students and workers returning from Britain. In 1904, they formed San Sebastián Recreation Club, the first football club in the city, and in 1905 the club competed in the Copa del Rey. In 1907, a conflict between the club's members caused the team to split with several players (such as Alfonso and Miguel Sena and Domingo Arrillaga) leaving to create a new team in 1908, the San Sebastian Football Club. This team applied to enter the 1909 Copa del Rey, but complications over registration permits saw them compete as Club Ciclista de San Sebastián. This team convincingly defeated the powerful Athletic Club 4–2 in the quarter-finals and then beat Club Español de Madrid 3–1 in the final. A notable figure of this team was George McGuinness, who netted 6 goals in the tournament including the opener in the final.

A few months after this victory, the players who had won the tournament founded the Sociedad de Futbol on 7 September 1909. Sociedad applied to enter the 1910 Copa del Rey, but once again had to compete under a different name, Vasconia de San Sebastián, and once again they reached the final (UECF), where they were beaten by Athletic (0–1). In the same year, King Alfonso XIII – who used San Sebastián as his summer capital – gave the club his patronage, where it subsequently became known as Real Sociedad de Fútbol. The first final the club played as Real Sociedad was in 1913, where FC Barcelona needed three games to beat them. After a 15-year hiatus, La Real reached the 1928 final, which was remarkably similar to their previous one since Barcelona again needed three games to beat them at El Sardinero.

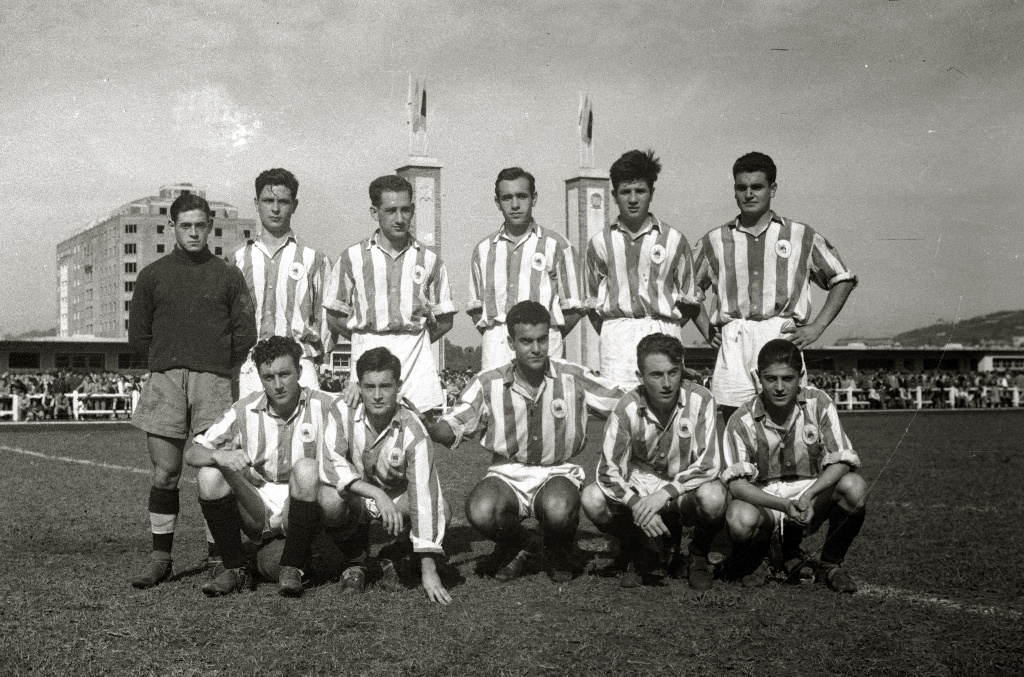
Real Sociedad in 1952

Real Sociedad was a founding member of La Liga in 1929. The team came fourth with Francisco "Paco" Bienzobas finishing as the top scorer. The team's name was changed to Donostia Club de Futbol in 1931 with the advent of the Second Spanish Republic, but changed back to Real Sociedad after the Spanish Civil War in 1939. The team has generally fluctuated between the Primera and Segunda divisions, in one period (during the 1940s) managing to be relegated and promoted seven times. Around that time, the sculptor Eduardo Chillida was the team's goalkeeper until injury put a stop to his football career.

=== The success of the 1980s ===
The team finished as runners-up in La Liga for the first time in 1979–80, gaining 52 points compared to Real Madrid's 53, and 13 points clear of third-placed Sporting de Gijón. Real Sociedad won its first ever Primera División title at the end of the 1980–81 season, denying Real Madrid a fourth-consecutive title because although both clubs earned 45 points and Madrid had the superior goal difference Sociedad were better in the head-to-heads. This qualified La Real for the 1981–82 European Cup, where they were eliminated in the first round by CSKA Sofia of Bulgaria, who hosted and won the first leg 1–0. The second leg in Spain was a 0–0 draw.

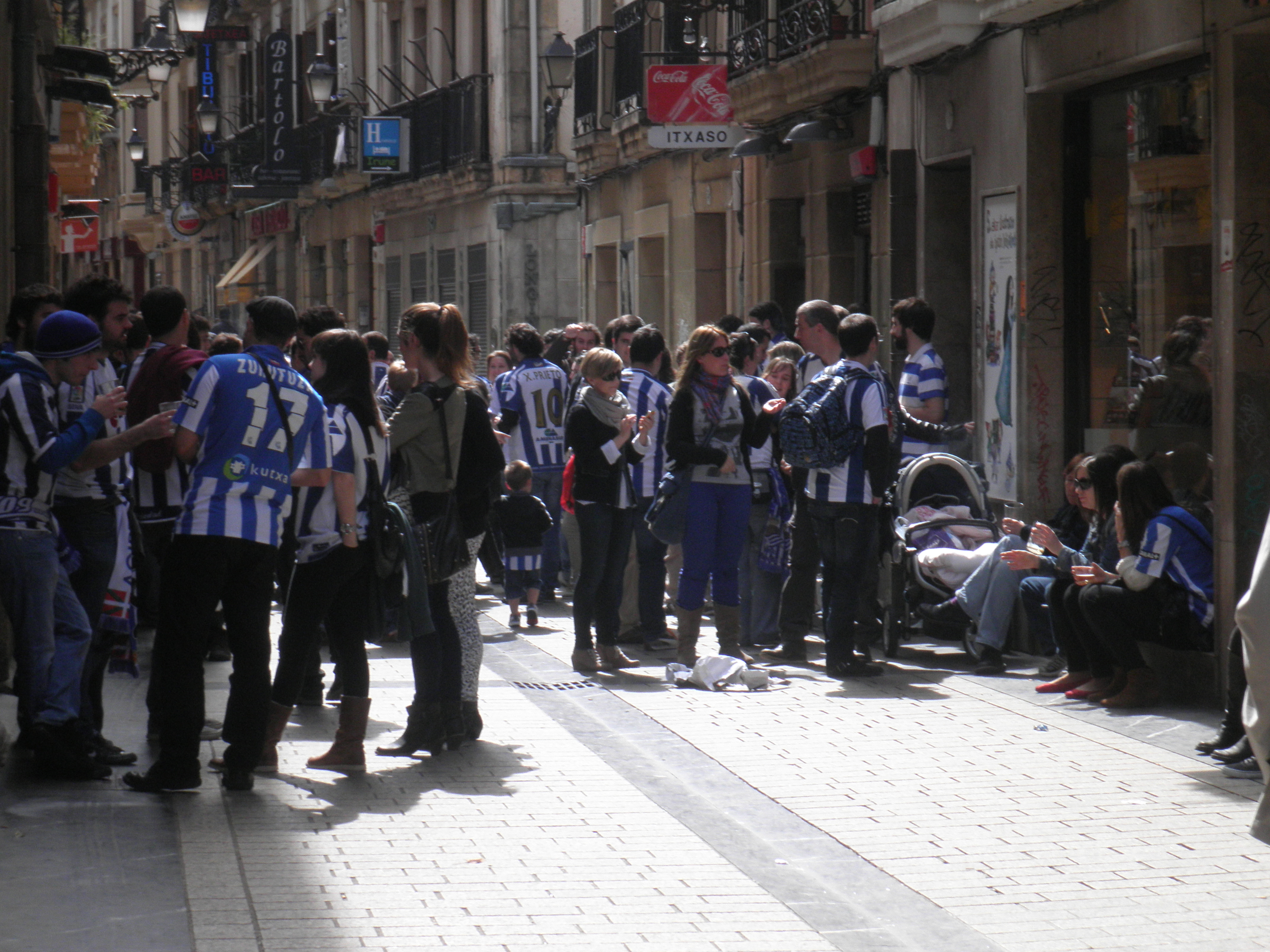
Real Sociedad supporters at the streets of San Sebastián

The club retained the Liga title the following season, beating Barcelona by 47 points to 45, under the management of Alberto Ormaetxea. Forward Jesús María Satrústegui was the club's top scorer for 1980–81 with 16 goals. He scored 13 the following season as Pedro Uralde was the top scorer, with 14. The club reached the semi-finals of the 1982–83 European Cup, defeating Víkingur of Iceland, Celtic and Sporting Clube de Portugal before losing 3–2 on aggregate to eventual champions Hamburger SV. Real Sociedad won the Supercopa de España at the beginning of the 1982–83 season, overturning a 1–0 defeat in the first leg to defeat Real Madrid 4–1 on aggregate.

On 11 March 1987, Real Sociedad set a record for most goals in a quarter-final of the Copa del Rey after defeating Mallorca 10–1. In the semi-finals of the same tournament, it beat its Basque rivals Athletic Bilbao 1–0 over two legs. On 27 June 1987, Real Sociedad won its first Copa del Rey title, defeating Atlético Madrid 4–2 on penalties after drawing 2–2. The match was held at La Romareda in Zaragoza, Aragon. In the following season's Copa del Rey, Real Sociedad defeated Atlético Madrid again after defeating them in the quarter-finals. It then beat Real Madrid 5–0 on aggregate in the semi-finals, but lost 1–0 in the final to Barcelona at Real Madrid's Santiago Bernabéu Stadium on 30 March 1988. In the 1987–88 La Liga, Real Sociedad were runners-up for the first time since its lost its title – with 51 points to Real Madrid's 62 – and three points clear of third-placed Atlético Madrid.

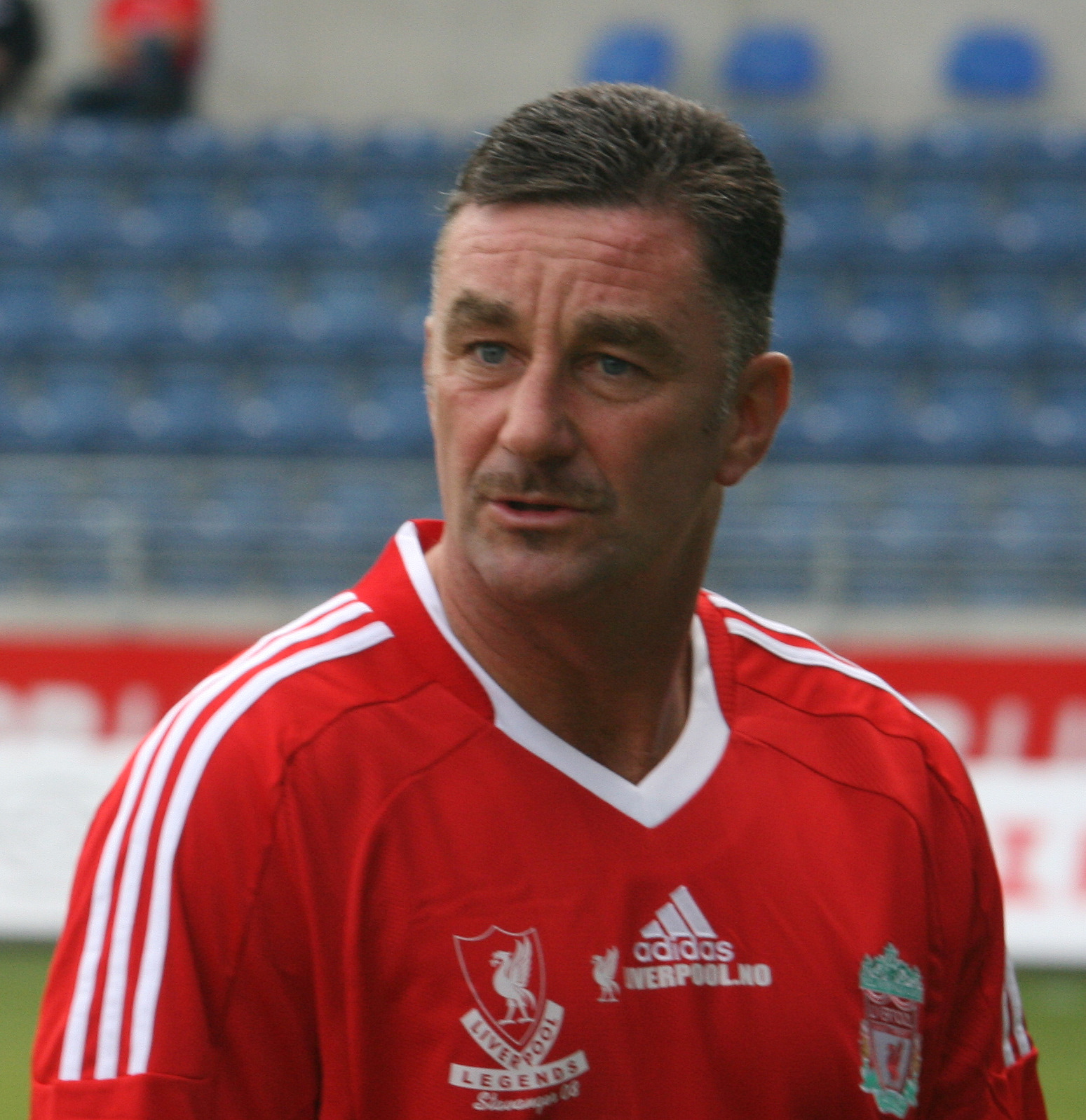
The Republic of Ireland international John Aldridge was Real Sociedad's first non-Basque player, and was the club's top scorer during both of his seasons from 1989 to 1991

For many years, Real Sociedad followed the practice of its Basque rivals Athletic Bilbao of signing only Basque players. It abandoned the policy in 1989 when it signed Irish international John Aldridge from Liverpool. Aldridge scored 16 goals in his first season to be the club's top scorer, and fourth-highest scorer of the entire league as La Real finished fifth. In 1990, La Real signed an English striker, Dalian Atkinson of Sheffield Wednesday, who therefore became the club's first black player. He scored 12 goals in his first season, second at the club only to Aldridge's 17. That was Aldridge's final season at La Real, and he left to play in the English 2nd tier at Tranmere Rovers, while Atkinson left to join top-flight Aston Villa.

In 1997–98, Real Sociedad finished third, its best finish since being runners-up for the first time since 1988. Its total of 63 points was 11 less than champions Barcelona but just two less than runners-up Athletic Bilbao. The club finished higher in the table than Real Madrid due to a superior goal differential. Yugoslav striker Darko Kovačević scored 17 times that season, making him the fourth-highest scorer in the league. The third-place finish qualified La Real for the 1998–99 UEFA Cup, where it beat Sparta Prague and Dynamo Moscow before being knocked out in the third round by Atlético Madrid.

=== 21st century ===
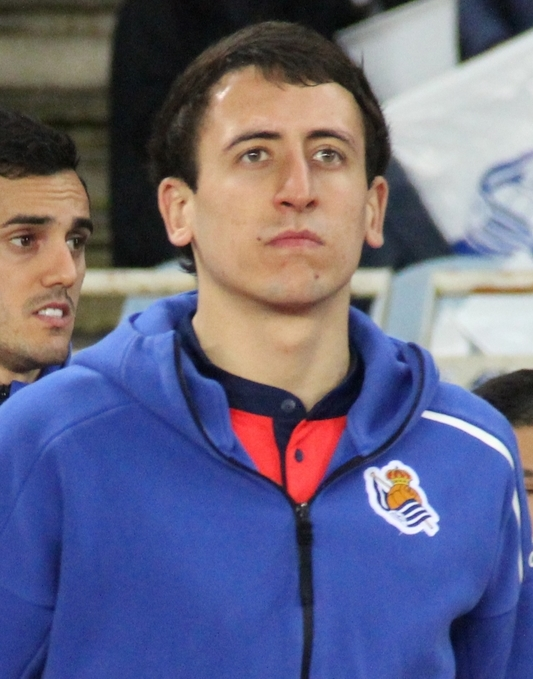
Mikel Oyarzabal, Real Sociedad player and national Spanish team player.

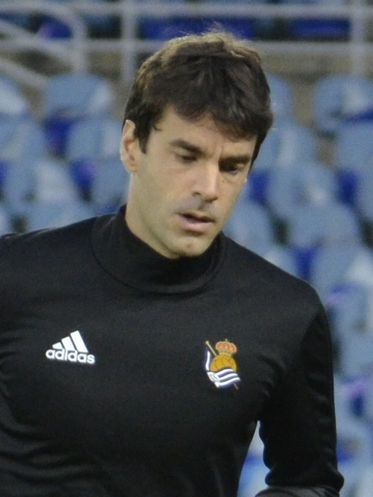
Xabi Prieto was a key player as the top goalscorer as Real Sociedad finished in the 21st century

After finishing in 13th position for three consecutive seasons, Real Sociedad were runners-up in the 2002–03 La Liga, its best finish since 1988. Its tally of 76 points was only beaten by Real Madrid's 78, and La Real had four more points than third-placed Deportivo de La Coruña. The club was managed by Frenchman Raynald Denoueix. La Real's strikeforce combined the Turkish striker Nihat Kahveci with Yugoslav international Darko Kovačević. The two were third and fourth top scorer in the league respectively, with 23 and 20 goals. The team also included Dutch international goalkeeper Sander Westerveld and Xabi Alonso in midfield. Alonso was the winner of the 2003 Don Balón award for the best Spanish player in the league, while Kahveci was voted the best foreign player and Denoueix the best manager.

Key moments from that season came when Real Sociedad beat Real Madrid in April 4–2 at the Anoeta Stadium. It kept first place in La Liga until the penultimate game of 38, when it lost 3–2 away to Celta de Vigo, while Real Madrid beat Atlético Madrid 4–0. This meant that Real Madrid secured first place two points clear of Real Sociedad for the last game, where La Real defeated Atlético Madrid 3–0 and Real Madrid beat Athletic Bilbao to win the title. The team qualified directly for the 2003–04 UEFA Champions League after finishing second; it was unbeaten at home, scored 71 goals in total and lost just six times.

Real Sociedad were placed in Group D of the 2003–04 Champions League with Juventus, Galatasaray and Olympiacos. The team won two matches, drew three and lost away to Juventus to finish second and advance to the last 16. It was knocked out after losing 1–0 in both games against Lyon, hosting the first game. The 2003–04 La Liga saw a dramatic decline in the club's performance, slipping to 15th out of 20. Their tally of 46 points was only five more than relegated Real Valladolid.

On 9 September 2006, Real Sociedad played its 2,000th La Liga match. That same season, they were relegated from La Liga, finishing 19th and ended a 40-year streak there, their longest ever stay in the top flight. On 9 July 2007, former Welsh international and Fulham manager Chris Coleman was appointed as the new club coach, on the recommendation of former Real Sociedad manager John Toshack, an important board member at the club. Coleman resigned on 16 January 2008.

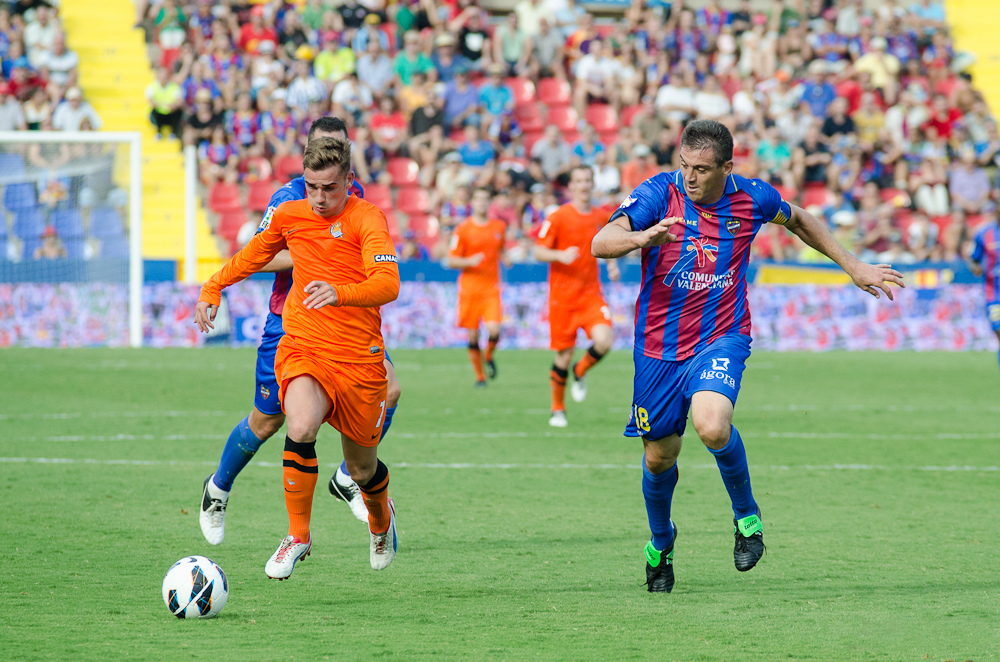
Antoine Griezmann playing a fixture against Levante in 2012

In the 2012–13 season, Real Sociedad finished in fourth place and qualified for the 2013–14 Champions League for the first time since the 2003–04 season, but in the play-offs, this time. In the play-offs, the club defeated Lyon 2–0 in both legs to qualify for the group stage. Real Sociedad, however, did not make it out of the group, earning just one point.

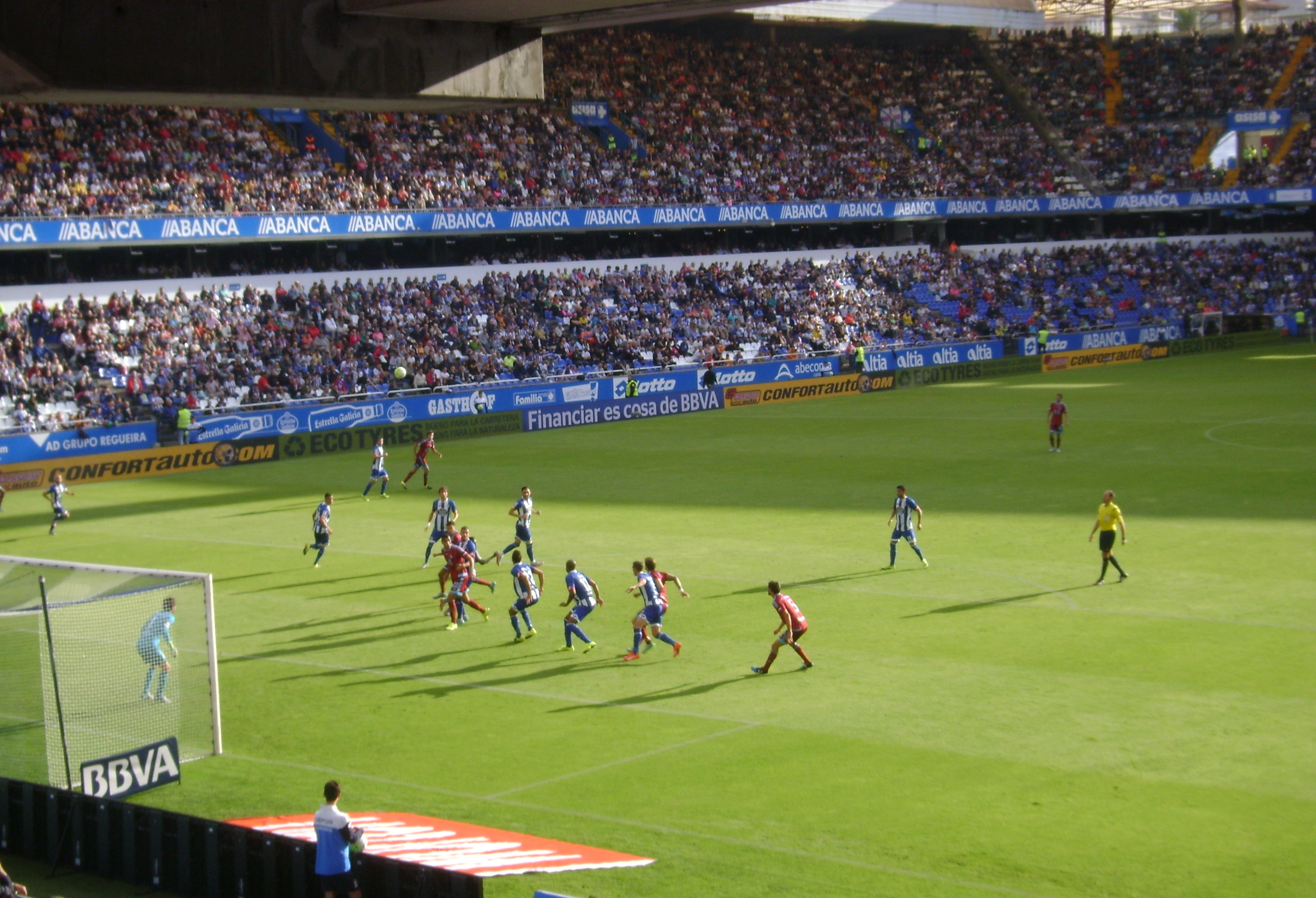
Deportivo de La Coruña vs. Real Sociedad.

On 10 November 2014, Real Sociedad announced David Moyes as the chosen manager to replace Jagoba Arrasate, who was sacked following a series of poor results. Moyes became the sixth British manager in the club's history, however he was sacked 9 November 2015 after falling to 16th in La Liga. Later that day, he was replaced by Eusebio Sacristán.

Sacristán signed an initial contract until 30 June 2017. His contract was renewed in 2017, but Sacristán was ultimately dismissed after a string of poor performances left that 15th in the table and drawn into a relegation battle. Aiser Garitano became the next head coach, having arrived from Leganés. He lasted only seven months before being dismissed, with the team also in 15th place, with only five wins in his seventeen league matches.

Chart of Real Sociedad league performance 1929-present

Garitano was succeeded by reserve team manager and local boy Imanol Alguacil on 26 December 2018. During his tenure, he oversaw an attacking style of play combining pace, precision, power, and exuberance.

In 2008, at Real Sociedad's annual general meeting, Iñaki Badiola, at the time the club's president, accused the preceding club management of buying doping substances. In 2013 Badiola gave an extended interview in which he accused José Luis Astiazarán's presidency of paying up to €300,000 to Eufemiano Fuentes to dope players on the team between 2001 and 2007. José Luis Astiazarán, who was Real Sociedad's president between 2001 and 2005, denied the claims.

Real Sociedad won its third Copa del Rey on 3 April 2021, the nearly year-long delayed 2020 Copa del Rey Final due to COVID-19, in a Basque derby against Athletic Bilbao. In the 2022–23 season, the club finished fourth in La Liga to qualify to the next season's Champions League for the first time in ten years.. Then, on April 19th, 2026, Real Sociedad thrillingly won the Copa Del Rey in Seville. They defeated Atletico Madrid 4-3 on penalties. Pelligrino Matarazzo, the US-born manager, fielded 10 homegrown players while leading the team to an impressive victory.

== Stadium and facility ==
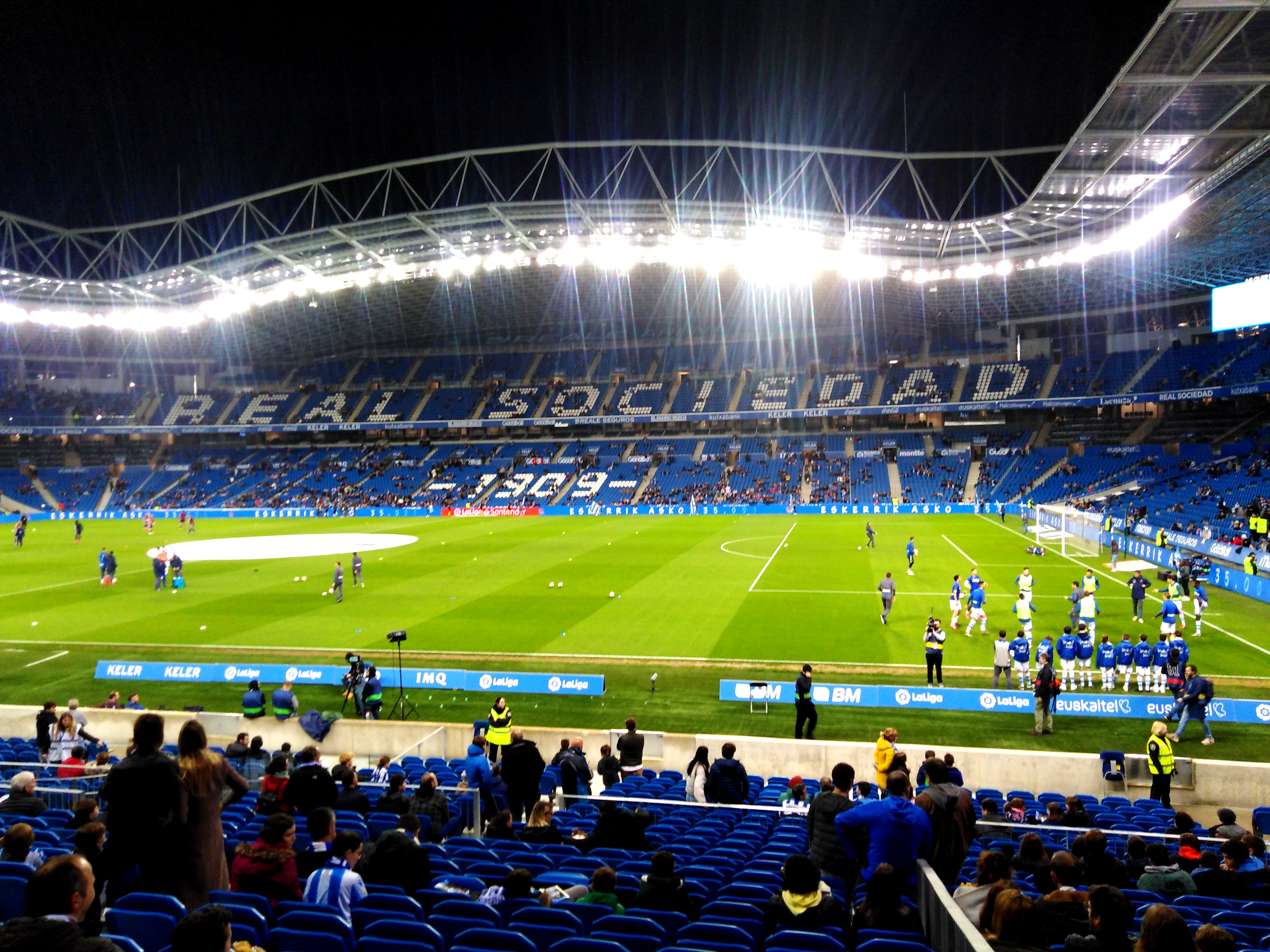
View of the Anoeta Stadium.

Real Sociedad plays home fixtures in the Anoeta Stadium. The venue is owned by the San Sebastián Municipal Council.

== Name and colours ==
The club's name means "Royal Society of Football" in Spanish. The club's name was changed to Donostia Club de Futbol in 1931 with the advent of the Second Spanish Republic, but changed back to Real Sociedad after the Spanish Civil War in 1939. The club is nicknamed in Basque as Erreala ("Royal") or the txuri-urdin ("white-blue" due to the colours of their kit). The colours stem from the flag of San Sebastián: a blue canton on a white field.

== Fanbase ==
The Spanish Centro de Investigaciones Sociológicas (Centre of Sociological Investigations) found out that of 2,473 adults interviewed in 49 provinces in 2007, 1.3% of the Spanish population have more of an affinity for Real Sociedad than any other club, and 1.5% have more of an affinity for La Real than any other club apart from their favourite.

In appreciation of the value of the supporters to the club – in the words of club president Jokin Aperribay, "The fans are the soul, the nourishment and the reason for Real Sociedad" – the players each wore the name of a randomly selected club member on their shirt for the match against Sevilla in December 2012.

== Honours ==
=== Domestic ===
==== League ====
- La Liga
  - Winners (2): 1980–81, 1981–82
- Segunda División
  - Winners (3): 1948–49, 1966–67, 2009–10

==== Cup ====
- Copa del Rey
  - Winners (4): (Note: In 1909 it was won by its forerunner, Club Ciclista de San Sebastián) 1909, 1986–87, 2019–20, 2025–26
- Supercopa de España
  - Winners (1): 1982

==== Regional competition ====
- Gipuzkoa Championship
  - Winners (6): 1918–19, 1922–23, 1924–25, 1926–27, 1928–29, 1932–33

== Players ==
=== Current squad ===
As of 1 September 2026

Note: Flags indicate national team as defined under FIFA eligibility rules; some limited exceptions apply. Players may hold more than one non-FIFA nationality.

No.	Pos.	Nation	Player
1	GK	ESP	Álex Remiro
2	DF	VEN	Jon Aramburu
3	DF	ESP	Aihen Muñoz
4	MF	ESP	Jon Gorrotxategi
5	DF	ESP	Igor Zubeldia (vice captain)
6	DF	ESP	Jon Martín
7	FW	ESP	Ander Barrenetxea
8	MF	ESP	Beñat Turrientes
9	FW	ISL	Orri Óskarsson
10	FW	ESP	Mikel Oyarzabal (captain)
11	FW	POR	Gonçalo Guedes
12	FW	KEN	Job Ochieng

No.	Pos.	Nation	Player
13	GK	ESP	Unai Marrero
14	MF	JPN	Takefusa Kubo
15	MF	ESP	Pablo Marín
16	DF	ESP	Jon Pacheco
17	MF	ESP	Sergio Gómez
18	MF	ESP	Carlos Soler
19	DF	SEN	Mamadou Sarr (on loan from Chelsea)
20	DF	ESP	Álvaro Odriozola
21	MF	VEN	Yangel Herrera
22	DF	ESP	Héctor Fort
23	MF	RUS	Arsen Zakharyan
24	MF	CRO	Luka Sučić

=== Reserve team ===
Note: Flags indicate national team as defined under FIFA eligibility rules; some limited exceptions apply. Players may hold more than one non-FIFA nationality.

No.	Pos.	Nation	Player
26	MF	ESP	Ibai Aguirre
27	FW	ESP	Gorka Carrera
28	MF	FRA	Alex Lebarbier

No.	Pos.	Nation	Player
29	FW	ESP	Alex Marchal
34	DF	ESP	Luken Beitia
44	GK	FRA	Theo Folgado

=== Out on loan ===
Note: Flags indicate national team as defined under FIFA eligibility rules; some limited exceptions apply. Players may hold more than one non-FIFA nationality.

No.	Pos.	Nation	Player
—	DF	ESP	Javi López (at Feyenoord until 30 June 2027)
—	MF	ESP	Mikel Goti (at Oviedo until 30 June 2027)

== Seasons ==
=== Recent seasons ===
La Real's finishing positions since the introduction of the Spanish football league system

Season	Div.	Pos.	Pld	W	D	L	GF	GA	Pts	Cup	Europe		Notes
2013–14	1D	7th	38	16	11	11	62	55	59	Semi-final	UCL	Group stage	
2014–15	1D	12th	38	11	13	14	44	51	46	Round of 16	UEL	Play-off round	
2015–16	1D	9th	38	13	9	16	45	48	48	Round of 32			
2016–17	1D	6th	38	19	7	12	59	53	64	Quarter-final			
2017–18	1D	12th	38	14	7	17	66	59	49	Round of 32	UEL	Round of 32	
2018–19	1D	9th	38	13	11	14	45	46	50	Round of 16			
2019–20	1D	6th	38	16	8	14	56	48	56	Winners			
2020–21	1D	5th	38	17	11	10	59	38	62	Round of 16	UEL	Round of 32	
2021–22	1D	6th	38	17	11	10	40	37	62	Quarter-finals	UEL	Knockout round play-offs	
2022–23	1D	4th	38	21	8	9	51	35	71	Quarter-finals	UEL	Round of 16	
2023–24	1D	6th	38	16	12	10	51	39	60	Semi-final	UCL	Round of 16	
2024–25	1D	11th	38	13	7	18	35	46	46	Semi-final	UEL	Round of 16	
2025–26	1D	10th	38	11	13	14	59	61	46	Winners			

=== Season to season ===
- As Real Sociedad de Foot-ball

Season	Tier	Division	Place	Copa del Rey
1929	1	1ª	4th	Round of 16
1929–30	1	1ª	7th	Round of 16
1930–31	1	1ª	3rd	Round of 32

- As Donostia Football Club

Season	Tier	Division	Place	Copa del Rey
1931–32	1	1ª	8th	Quarter-finals
1932–33	1	1ª	6th	Round of 32
1933–34	1	1ª	5th	Round of 16
1934–35	1	1ª	11th	Fifth round
1935–36	2	2ª	6th	First round

- As Real Sociedad de Fútbol

Season	Tier	Division	Place	Copa del Rey
1939–40	2	2ª	1st	Round of 16
1940–41	2	2ª	1st	Semi-finals
1941–42	1	1ª	14th	Round of 16
1942–43	2	2ª	1st	Round of 16
1943–44	1	1ª	13th	Round of 16
1944–45	2	2ª	4th	Round of 16
1945–46	2	2ª	6th	First round
1946–47	2	2ª	3rd	First round
1947–48	1	1ª	13th	Semi-finals
1948–49	2	2ª	1st	Quarter-finals
1949–50	1	1ª	8th	Round of 16
1950–51	1	1ª	5th	Runners-up
1951–52	1	1ª	10th	Quarter-finals
1952–53	1	1ª	10th	Quarter-finals
1953–54	1	1ª	9th	Quarter-finals
1954–55	1	1ª	14th	Did not participate
1955–56	1	1ª	8th	Round of 16
1956–57	1	1ª	12th	Semi-finals
1957–58	1	1ª	9th	Semi-finals
1958–59	1	1ª	10th	Round of 32

Season	Tier	Division	Place	Copa del Rey
1959–60	1	1ª	14th	Round of 16
1960–61	1	1ª	8th	Round of 16
1961–62	1	1ª	15th	Round of 32
1962–63	2	2ª	4th	Round of 32
1963–64	2	2ª	6th	Round of 16
1964–65	2	2ª	4th	Semi-finals
1965–66	2	2ª	10th	Round of 32
1966–67	2	2ª	1st	Round of 32
1967–68	1	1ª	14th	Round of 16
1968–69	1	1ª	7th	Semi-finals
1969–70	1	1ª	7th	Round of 16
1970–71	1	1ª	8th	Quarter-finals
1971–72	1	1ª	8th	Quarter-finals
1972–73	1	1ª	7th	Fifth round
1973–74	1	1ª	4th	Round of 16
1974–75	1	1ª	4th	Quarter-finals
1975–76	1	1ª	8th	Semi-finals
1976–77	1	1ª	8th	Round of 16
1977–78	1	1ª	11th	Semi-finals
1978–79	1	1ª	4th	Fourth round

Season	Tier	Division	Place	Copa del Rey
1979–80	1	1ª	2nd	Quarter-finals
1980–81	1	1ª	1st	Round of 16
1981–82	1	1ª	1st	Semi-finals
1982–83	1	1ª	7th	Semi-finals
1983–84	1	1ª	6th	Round of 16
1984–85	1	1ª	7th	Quarter-finals
1985–86	1	1ª	7th	Third round
1986–87	1	1ª	10th	Winners
1987–88	1	1ª	2nd	Runners-up
1988–89	1	1ª	11th	Round of 16
1989–90	1	1ª	5th	Quarter-finals
1990–91	1	1ª	13th	Round of 16
1991–92	1	1ª	5th	Fifth round
1992–93	1	1ª	13th	Quarter-finals
1993–94	1	1ª	11th	Fifth found
1994–95	1	1ª	11th	Fourth round
1995–96	1	1ª	7th	Second round
1996–97	1	1ª	8th	Second round
1997–98	1	1ª	3rd	Round of 16
1998–99	1	1ª	10th	Round of 16

Season	Tier	Division	Place	Copa del Rey
1999–2000	1	1ª	13th	First round
2000–01	1	1ª	13th	Round of 64
2001–02	1	1ª	13th	Round of 64
2002–03	1	1ª	2nd	Round of 64
2003–04	1	1ª	15th	Round of 32
2004–05	1	1ª	14th	Round of 32
2005–06	1	1ª	16th	Third round
2006–07	1	1ª	19th	Round of 32
2007–08	2	2ª	4th	Second round
2008–09	2	2ª	6th	Third round
2009–10	2	2ª	1st	Second round
2010–11	1	1ª	15th	Round of 32
2011–12	1	1ª	12th	Round of 16
2012–13	1	1ª	4th	Round of 32
2013–14	1	1ª	7th	Semi-finals
2014–15	1	1ª	12th	Round of 16
2015–16	1	1ª	9th	Round of 32
2016–17	1	1ª	6th	Quarter-finals
2017–18	1	1ª	12th	Round of 32
2018–19	1	1ª	9th	Round of 16

Season	Tier	Division	Place	Copa del Rey
2019–20	1	1ª	6th	Winners
2020–21	1	1ª	5th	Round of 16
2021–22	1	1ª	6th	Quarter-finals
2022–23	1	1ª	4th	Quarter-finals
2023–24	1	1ª	6th	Semi-finals
2024–25	1	1ª	11th	Semi-finals
2025–26	1	1ª	10th	Winners
2026–27	1	1ª		

- 80 seasons in La Liga
- 16 seasons in Segunda División

== History in European competitions ==
=== Overall record ===
Accurate as of 14 February 2024

Competition	Pld	W	D	L	GF	GA	GD	Win%
European Cup / Champions League (5)	33	11	9	13	31	33	−2	33.33
UEFA Cup Winners' Cup (1)	4	1	3	0	3	1	+2	25.00
UEFA Cup / Europa League (13)	70	31	17	22	96	89	+7	44.29
Total	107	43	29	35	130	123	+7	40.19

Source: UEFA.com
Pld = Matches played; W = Matches won; D = Matches drawn; L = Matches lost; GF = Goals for; GA = Goals against; GD = Goal Difference.

== Coaching staff ==
Position	Staff
Director of football	(Spain) Erik Bretos
Head coach	(United States) Pellegrino Matarazzo
Assistant coach	(Turkey) Ömer Toprak (Australia) John Maisano (Spain) Iosu Rivas (Spain) Felipe Sánchez Mateos
Fitness coach	(Spain) Oier Agirrezabalaga (Spain) Iñigo Almandoz
Chief analyst	(Spain) Jose Rodríguez
Match analyst	(Spain) Héctor Ibáñez (Spain) Xabier Ruiz de Ocenda
Mental coach	(Spain) Imanol Ibarrondo
Goalkeeper coach	(Spain) Jon Alemán
Scout	(Spain) Mikel Aranburu
Match delegate	(Spain) Miguel Díaz
Material managers	(Spain) José Luis Sánchez (Spain) Pablo Marañón (Spain) Ion Jabat
Doctor	(Spain) Xabi Valencia
Physiotherapist	(Spain) Imanol Soroa (Spain) Iñaki Ayuela (Spain) Jon Igarzabal (Spain) Iñigo Murua
Nutritionist	(Spain) Natalia Ibáñez
Rehab fitness coach	(Spain) Alain Gandiaga
Delegate	(Spain) Juantxo Trezet
Loan player manager	(Spain) Gorka Larrea

== Managers ==
Dates	Coach
1918–23	(Spain) José Berraondo
1923–26	(Hungary) Lippo Hertzka
1926	(Spain) Luis Ortiz de Urbina
1926–30	(Spain) Benito Díaz
1930–35	(England) Harry Lowe
1939–41	(Spain) Gaspar Gurruchaga
1941–42	(Spain) Sebastián Silveti (Spain) Patxi Gamborena
1942–51	(Spain) Benito Díaz
1951–55	(Spain) José Ignacio Urbieta
1955–60	(Spain) Salvador Artigas
1960	(Spain) Joseba Elizondo
1960–62	(Spain) Baltasar Albéniz
1962	(Spain) Joseba Elizondo
1962–63	(Spain) Perico Torres
1963–64	(Spain) Antonio Barrios
1964–66	(Spain) Román Galarraga
1966–70	(Spain) Andoni Elizondo
1970–70	(Spain) Angel Segurola
1970–72	(Spain) Andoni Elizondo
1972–74	(Spain) Rafael Iriondo
1974–76	(Spain) Andoni Elizondo
1976–78	(Spain) José Antonio Irulegui
1978–85	(Spain) Alberto Ormaetxea

Dates	Coach
1 July 1985 – 8 May 1989	(Wales) John Toshack
9 May 1989 – 14 January 1991	(Spain) Marco Antonio Boronat
15 January 1991 – 30 June 1991	(Spain) Javier Expósito
1 July 1991 – 21 November 1994	(Wales) John Toshack
22 November 1994 – 27 November 1995	(Spain) Salva Iriarte
28 November 1995 – 30 June 1997	(Spain) Javier Irureta
1 July 1997 – 25 October 1999	(Austria) Bernd Krauss
26 October 1999 – 23 October 2000	(Spain) Javier Clemente
24 October 2000 – 21 December 2000	(Spain) Perico Alonso
22 December 2000 – 11 March 2002	(Wales) John Toshack
12 March 2002 – 30 June 2002	(Spain) Roberto Olabe
1 July 2002 – 30 June 2004	(France) Raynald Denoueix
1 July 2004 – 30 January 2006	(Spain) José María Amorrortu

Dates	Coach
31 January 2006 – 23 March 2006	(Spain) Gonzalo Arconada
23 March 2006 – 26 October 2006	(Spain) José Mari Bakero
26 October 2006 – 30 June 2007	(Spain) Miguel Ángel Lotina
1 July 2007 – 16 January 2008	(Wales) Chris Coleman
15 January 2008 – 2 April 2008	(Spain) José Ramón Eizmendi
3 April 2008 – 30 June 2009	(Spain) Juanma Lillo
1 July 2009 – 30 June 2011	(Uruguay) Martín Lasarte
1 July 2011 – 30 June 2013	(France) Philippe Montanier
1 July 2013 – 3 November 2014	(Spain) Jagoba Arrasate
10 November 2014 – 9 November 2015	(Scotland) David Moyes
9 November 2015 – 19 March 2018	(Spain) Eusebio
19 March 2018 – 24 May 2018	(Spain) Imanol Alguacil
24 May 2018 – 26 December 2018	(Spain) Asier Garitano
26 December 2018 – 24 May 2025	(Spain) Imanol Alguacil

Dates	Coach
24 May 2025 – 14 December 2025	(Spain) Sergio Francisco
20 December 2025 –	(United States) Pellegrino Matarazzo

== Player statistics ==
=== Most appearances ===
Rank	Player	Matches
1	(Spain) Alberto Górriz	599
2	(Spain) Juan Antonio Larrañaga	589
3	(Spain) Jesús María Zamora	588
4	(Spain) Luis Arconada	551
5	(Spain) Xabi Prieto	529
6	(Spain) Miguel Fuentes	495
7	(Spain) Roberto López Ufarte	474
8	(Spain) Agustín Gajate	469
9	(Spain) Inaxio Kortabarria	442
10	(Spain) Mikel Oyarzabal	437

=== Top scorers ===
Rank	Player	Goals
1	(Spain) Jesús María Satrústegui	162
2	(Spain) Mikel Oyarzabal	133
3	(Spain) Roberto López Ufarte	129
4	(Spain) Cholín	127
5	(Spain) Sebastián Ontoria	114
6	(Spain) Paco Bienzobas	107
7	(Serbia) Darko Kovačević	107
8	(Spain) Pedro Uralde	100
9	(Spain) José Mari Bakero	91
10	(Spain) José Mari Pérez	84

== Notable former players ==
Note: this list includes players that have appeared in at least 100 league games or have reached international status.

- (Argentina) Domingo Arrillaga
- (Argentina) Juan Gómez
- (Argentina) Gabriel Schürrer
- (Austria) Dietmar Kühbauer
- (Bosnia and Herzegovina) Meho Kodro
- (Chile) Claudio Bravo
- (Chile) Mark González
- (England) Dalian Atkinson
- (Equatorial Guinea) Juan Cuyami
- (Equatorial Guinea) Emilio Nsue
- (France) Antoine Griezmann
- (Republic of Ireland) John Aldridge
- (Lithuania) Edgaras Jankauskas
- (Mexico) Carlos Vela
- (Netherlands) Sander Westerveld
- (Nigeria) Mutiu Adepoju
- (Norway) Bjørn Tore Kvarme
- (Norway) Martin Ødegaard
- (Portugal) Oceano da Cruz
- (Portugal) Carlos Xavier
- (Portugal) Ricardo Sá Pinto
- (Romania) Gheorghe Craioveanu
- (Russia) Valery Karpin
- (Russia) Dmitri Khokhlov
- (Scotland) Kieran Tierney
- (Serbia) Darko Kovačević
- (Spain) Imanol Agirretxe
- (Spain) Bittor Alkiza
- (Spain) Periko Alonso
- (Spain) Xabi Alonso
- (Spain) Xabier Prieto
- (Spain) Mikel Aranburu
- (Spain) Agustín Aranzábal
- (Spain) José Araquistáin
- (Spain) Luis Arconada
- (Spain) Pedro María Artola
- (Spain) José Mari Bakero
- (Spain) Txiki Begiristain
- (Spain) Paco Bienzobas
- (Spain) Cholín
- (Spain) Diego
- (Spain) Agustín Eizaguirre
- (Spain) Ignacio Eizaguirre
- (Spain) Andoni Elizondo
- (Spain) Epi
- (Spain) Joseba Etxeberria
- (Spain) Miguel Ángel Fuentes
- (Spain) Agustín Gajate
- (Spain) Marcelino Gálatas
- (Spain) Gaztelu
- (Spain) Jon Andoni Goikoetxea
- (Spain) Alberto Górriz
- (Spain) Iñigo Idiakez
- (Spain) Santiago Idígoras
- (Spain) Silvestre Igoa
- (Spain) Andoni Imaz
- (Spain) Juan Antonio Ipiña
- (Spain) Rafael Iriondo
- (Spain) José Antonio Irulegui
- (Spain) Kiriki
- (Spain) Inaxio Kortabarria
- (Spain) Juan Antonio Larrañaga
- (Spain) Mikel Lasa
- (Spain) Iñigo Martínez
- (Spain) Aitor López Rekarte
- (Spain) Luis López Rekarte
- (Spain) Roberto López Ufarte
- (Spain) José María Lumbreras
- (Spain) Julio Olaizola
- (Spain) David Zurutuza
- (Spain) Sebastián Ontoria
- (Spain) Javier de Pedro
- (Spain) Jesús María Satrústegui
- (Spain) Silverio
- (Spain) Pedro Uralde
- (Spain) Javier Urruticoechea
- (Spain) Mariano Yurrita
- (Spain) Domingo Zaldúa
- (Spain) Jesús María Zamora
- (Spain) David Silva
- (Spain) Nacho Monreal
- (Spain) Mikel Merino
- (Spain) Martin Zubimendi
- (Sweden) Håkan Mild
- (Sweden) Agne Simonsson
- (Sweden) Alexander Isak
- (Turkey) Nihat Kahveci
- (Turkey) Tayfun Korkut
- (Uruguay) Sebastián Abreu
- (South Korea) Lee Chun-soo

== Presidents ==
Period	Presidentes
1909–1912	Adolfo Sáenz
1912–1915	Enrique Pardiñas
1915–1917	Antonio Vega de Seoane
1917–1918	Xabier Peña
1918–1919	Mariano Lacort
1919–1921	Camilo Rodríguez
1921–1922	José Gaytán de Ayala
1922–1924	Ramón Machimbarrena
1924–1927	Antonio Vega de Seoane
1927–1929	Luis Pradera

Period	Presidentes
1929–1930	Vicente Prado
1930–1932	Florentino Azqueta
1932–1935	Javier Peña
1935–1937	José María Gaztaminza
1937–1942	Francisco Molíns
1942–1945	Pedro Chillida
1945–1954	Felipe de Arteche
1954–1956	José María Gaztaminza
1956–1960	Emilio de Zulueta
1960–1962	Agustín Ciriza

Period	Presidentes
1962–1967	Antonio Vega de Seoane
1967–1983	José Luis Orbegozo
1983–1992	Iñaki Alkiza
1992–2001	Luis Uranga
2001–2005	José Luis Astiazarán
2005–2007	Miguel Ángel Fuentes
2007	María de la Peña
2007–2008	Juan Larzábal
2008	Iñaki Badiola
2008–present	Jokin Aperribay

== See also ==
- Real Sociedad B – 1st reserve team in Segunda División
- Real Sociedad C – 2nd reserve team in Tercera División
- Real Sociedad cantera – youth system up to 19 years, in leagues including División de Honor Juvenil
- Real Sociedad Femenino – women's team in the Primera División Femenino
