= 1993–94 RC Celta de Vigo season =

Celta Vigo
1993–94 season
- President: José Luis Núñez Gallego
- Head coach: Txetxu Rojo
- Stadium: Balaídos
- La Liga: 15th
- Copa del Rey: Final
- Top goalscorer: League: Vladimir Gudelj (12); All: Vladimir Gudelj (19)
Home colours	Away colours	Third colours

Celta Vigo contested La Liga and the Copa del Rey in the 1993–94 season. They placed 15th in La Liga, four places lower than the previous season. However, they excelled in the Copa del Rey, reaching the final for the first time since 1948 before losing on penalties to Real Zaragoza.

== Squad ==
Note: Flags indicate national team as defined under FIFA eligibility rules; some limited exceptions apply. Players may hold more than one non-FIFA nationality.

No.	Pos.	Nation	Player
—	GK	ESP	Santiago Cañizares
—	GK	ESP	Patxi Villanueva
—	DF	ESP	Borja Agirretxu
—	DF	ESP	Alejo
—	DF	ESP	Atilano
—	DF	ESP	Rafael Berges
—	DF	ESP	Luis Dadíe
—	DF	ESP	Javier Oliete (on loan from Albacete Balompié)
—	DF	ESP	Fernando Porto
—	DF	ESP	Patxi Salinas
—	MF	CRO	Stjepan Andrijašević
—	MF	ESP	Joseba Agirre
—	MF	ESP	Vicente Engonga

No.	Pos.	Nation	Player
—	MF	ESP	José Gil
—	MF	HUN	Zsolt Limperger
—	MF	ESP	Jorge Otero
—	MF	ESP	Carlos Pérez
—	MF	BIH	Milorad Ratković
—	MF	ESP	Vicente (captain)
—	MF	ESP	Tito Vilanova
—	FW	ESP	Fran
—	FW	BIH	Vladimir Gudelj
—	FW	ESP	Sebastián Losada
—	FW	ESP	Paco Salillas
—	FW	ESP	Salva

=== Left club during season ===
Note: Flags indicate national team as defined under FIFA eligibility rules; some limited exceptions apply. Players may hold more than one non-FIFA nationality.

No.	Pos.	Nation	Player
—	MF	BRA	Luisinho (on loan from Vasco da Gama)
—	MF	ESP	Manel (to Racing de Ferrol)

No.	Pos.	Nation	Player
—	MF	ESP	Juan Carlos Sanromán (to Extremadura)

== Squad stats ==
Last updated on 2 March 2021.

No.	Pos	Nat	Player	Total		La Liga		Copa del Rey	
No.	Pos	Nat	Player	Apps	Goals	Apps	Goals	Apps	Goals
	GK	(Spain) ESP	Santiago Cañizares	45	0	38	0	7	0
	GK	(Spain) ESP	Patxi Villanueva	6	0	0	0	6	0
	DF	(Spain) ESP	Borja Agirretxu	26	0	10+7	0	9	0
	DF	(Spain) ESP	Alejo	40	2	33+1	2	6	0
	DF	(Spain) ESP	Atilano	17	1	10	0	7	1
	DF	(Spain) ESP	Rafael Berges	35	2	29	2	5+1	0
	DF	(Spain) ESP	Luis Dadíe	36	0	16+7	0	11+2	0
	DF	(Spain) ESP	Javier Oliete	24	0	16+1	0	6+1	0
	DF	(Spain) ESP	Fernando Porto	2	0	0	0	2	0
	DF	(Spain) ESP	Patxi Salinas	37	1	29	1	8	0
	MF	(Croatia) CRO	Stjepan Andrijašević	32	10	25	9	6+1	1
	MF	(Spain) ESP	Joseba Agirre	11	1	9+2	1	0	0
	MF	(Spain) ESP	Vicente Engonga	47	0	36	0	10+1	0
	MF	(Spain) ESP	José Gil	41	1	27+8	1	5+1	0
	MF	(Hungary) HUN	Zsolt Limperger	1	0	1	0	0	0
	MF	(Spain) ESP	Jorge Otero	37	1	29	1	8	0
	MF	(Spain) ESP	Carlos Pérez	18	2	1+8	1	5+4	1
	MF	(Bosnia and Herzegovina) BIH	Milorad Ratković	32	3	18+4	1	10	2
	MF	(Spain) ESP	Vicente	12	0	10+1	0	1	0
	MF	(Spain) ESP	Tito Vilanova	2	0	0+1	0	0+1	0
	FW	(Spain) ESP	Fran	1	0	0	0	1	0
	FW	(Bosnia and Herzegovina) BIH	Vladimir Gudelj	44	19	31+3	12	9+1	7
	FW	(Spain) ESP	Sebastián Losada	39	10	27+6	8	3+3	2
	FW	(Spain) ESP	Paco Salillas	22	3	4+8	0	7+3	3
	FW	(Spain) ESP	Salva	34	3	13+10	2	6+5	1
Players who have left the club after the start of the season:
	MF	(Brazil) BRA	Luisinho	12	1	6+4	0	2	1
	MF	(Spain) ESP	Manel	5	1	0+1	0	2+2	1
	MF	(Spain) ESP	Juan Carlos Sanromán	1	0	0	0	1	0

== Results ==
=== La Liga ===
==== League table ====
Pos	Team	Pld	W	D	L	GF	GA	GD	Pts	Qualification or relegation
13	Albacete	38	10	15	13	49	58	−9	35 (Note: ATM: 5 pts; ALB: 4 pts; SPG: 3 pts)	
14	Sporting Gijón	38	15	5	18	42	57	−15	35	
15	Celta Vigo	38	11	11	16	41	51	−10	33 (Note: CEL 2–0 LOG; LOG 1–1 CEL)	
16	Logroñés	38	9	15	14	47	58	−11	33	
17	Rayo Vallecano (R)	38	9	13	16	40	58	−18	31	Qualification for the relegation playoffs

Source: LFP
Rules for classification: 1) points; 2) head-to-head points; 3) head-to-head goal difference; 4) head-to-head goals scored; 5) goal difference; 6) number of goals scored.
(R) Relegated

==== Matches ====
5 September 1993 1	Deportivo La Coruña	0 – 0	Celta Vigo	A Coruña, Spain
		Report		Stadium: Estadio Riazor; Referee: Juan Ansuátegui Roca

12 September 1993 2	Celta Vigo	1 – 1	Real Oviedo	Vigo, Spain
	Berges 41'	Report	25' Carreras	Stadium: Balaídos; Referee: José Núñez Manrique

19 September 1993 3	Atlético Madrid	3 – 2	Celta Vigo	Madrid, Spain
	Vizcaíno 24'; García 33'; Kiko 55'	Report	58' (pen.) Gudelj; 88' Losada	Stadium: Estadio Vicente Calderón; Referee: Miguel Marín López

26 September 1993 4	Celta Vigo	0 – 0	Racing Santander	Vigo, Spain
		Report		Stadium: Balaídos; Referee: Francisco Santamaría Uzqueda

3 October 1993 5	Tenerife	0 – 0	Celta Vigo	Santa Cruz de Tenerife, Spain
		Report		Stadium: Heliodoro Rodríguez López; Referee: Clemente Rivas Fernández

6 October 1993 6	Celta Vigo	1 – 0	Lleida	Vigo, Spain
	Losada 87'	Report		Stadium: Balaídos; Referee: José Rubio Valdivieso

17 October 1993 7	Rayo Vallecano	1 – 1	Celta Vigo	Madrid, Spain
	Pablo Gómez 9'	Report	66' Salva	Stadium: Nuevo Estadio de Vallecas; Referee: Juan Andújar Oliver

24 October 1993 8	Celta Vigo	2 – 0	Logroñés	Vigo, Spain
	Salinas 59'; Gudelj 60'	Report		Stadium: Balaídos; Referee: Celino Gracia Redondo

30 October 1993 9	Valencia	3 – 0	Celta Vigo	Valencia, Spain
	Fernando 30', 58'; Mijatović 64'	Report		Stadium: Estadio Luis Casanova; Referee: Victor José Esquinas Torres

7 November 1993 10	Celta Vigo	1 – 1	Athletic Bilbao	Vigo, Spain
	Gil 53'	Report	61' Valverde	Stadium: Balaídos; Referee: José Pérez Sánchez

10 November 1993 11	Celta Vigo	0 – 2	Sporting de Gijón	Vigo, Spain
		Report	44' (pen.) Muñiz; 89' Stanić	Stadium: Balaídos; Referee: José Pajares Paz

21 November 1993 12	Real Madrid	2 – 1	Celta Vigo	Madrid, Spain
	Zamorano 9'; Ramis 72'	Report	47' Losada	Stadium: Santiago Bernabéu Stadium; Referee: Juan Brito Arceo

28 November 1993 13	Celta Vigo	2 – 1	Sevilla	Vigo, Spain
	Andrijašević 24'; Losada 30'	Report	81' (pen.) Šuker	Stadium: Balaídos; Referee: Victor José Esquinas Torres

5 December 1993 14	Real Sociedad	2 – 1	Celta Vigo	San Sebastián, Spain
	Xavier 25'; Alejo 83' (o.g.)	Report	70' Losada	Stadium: Anoeta; Referee: José Núñez Manrique

12 December 1993 15	Celta Vigo	1 – 4	Albacete Balompié	Vigo, Spain
	Salva 33'	Report	45' Menéndez; 46', 85' Dos Santos; 89' Coco	Stadium: Balaídos; Referee: Juan Ansuátegui Roca

19 December 1993 16	Barcelona	1 – 0	Celta Vigo	Barcelona, Spain
	Laudrup 16'	Report		Stadium: Camp Nou; Referee: Clemente Rivas Fernández

2 January 1994 17	Celta Vigo	1 – 0	Real Zaragoza	Vigo, Spain
	Gudelj 8'	Report		Stadium: Balaídos; Referee: Juan Fernández Marín

9 January 1994 18	Osasuna	0 – 1	Celta Vigo	Pamplona, Spain
		Report	63' Berges	Stadium: El Sadar; Referee: José María García-Aranda

16 January 1994 19	Celta Vigo	1 – 2	Real Valladolid	Vigo, Spain
	Andrijašević 55'	Report	19' López; 83' Hurtado	Stadium: Balaídos; Referee: Alonso Gómez López

23 January 1994 20	Celta Vigo	0 – 0	Deportivo La Coruña	Vigo, Spain
		Report		Stadium: Balaídos; Referee: Celino Gracia Redondo

30 January 1994 21	Real Oviedo	1 – 0	Celta Vigo	Oviedo, Spain
	Alberto 7'	Report		Stadium: Estadio Carlos Tartiere; Referee: José Merino González

6 February 1994 22	Celta Vigo	3 – 2	Atlético Madrid	Vigo, Spain
	Losada 11', 89'; Andrijašević 43'	Report	6' Kosecki; 76' (o.g.) Oliete	Stadium: Balaídos; Referee: Miguel Marín López

13 February 1994 23	Racing Santander	2 – 1	Celta Vigo	Santander, Spain
	Adepoju 80'; Chili 89'	Report	69' (pen.) Gudelj	Stadium: El Sardinero; Referee: Manuel Díaz Vega

20 February 1994 24	Celta Vigo	1 – 0	Tenerife	Vigo, Spain
	Andrijašević 70' (pen.)	Report		Stadium: Balaídos; Referee: José María García-Aranda

23 February 1994 25	Lleida	0 – 0	Celta Vigo	Lleida, Spain
		Report		Stadium: Camp d'Esports; Referee: Juan Brito Arceo

27 February 1994 26	Celta Vigo	0 – 0	Rayo Vallecano	Vigo, Spain
		Report		Stadium: Balaídos; Referee: Joaquín Urío Velázquez

6 March 1994 27	Logroñés	1 – 1	Celta Vigo	Logroño, Spain
	Salenko 73'	Report	89' Andrijašević	Stadium: Estadio Las Gaunas; Referee: Juan Andújar Oliver

13 March 1994 28	Celta Vigo	1 – 2	Valencia	Vigo, Spain
	Otero 16'	Report	20' Flores; 86' Arroyo	Stadium: Balaídos; Referee: José Pajares Paz

20 March 1994 29	Athletic Bilbao	2 – 1	Celta Vigo	Bilbao, Spain
	Larrazábal 44' (pen.); Ziganda 85'	Report	43' Andrijašević	Stadium: San Mamés; Referee: Alonso Gómez López

27 March 1994 30	Sporting de Gijón	2 – 1	Celta Vigo	Gijón, Spain
	Sierra 55'; Castaño 73'	Report	48' Gudelj	Stadium: El Molinón; Referee: José Núñez Manrique

2 April 1994 31	Celta Vigo	3 – 2	Real Madrid	Vigo, Spain
	Ratković 48'; Andrijašević 59'; Gudelj 69'	Report	83' (pen.) Butragueño; 86' Hierro	Stadium: Balaídos; Referee: Celino Gracia Redondo

6 April 1994 32	Sevilla	4 – 1	Celta Vigo	Seville, Spain
	Moya 63', 82'; Šuker 72' (pen.), 84'	Report	89' Losada	Stadium: Ramón Sánchez Pizjuán; Referee: Juan Ansuátegui Roca

10 April 1994 33	Celta Vigo	3 – 2	Real Sociedad	Vigo, Spain
	Gudelj 36', 81' (pen.); Alejo 63'	Report	59' Fuentes; 70' Imanol Alguacil	Stadium: Balaídos; Referee: Manuel Díaz Vega

16 April 1994 34	Albacete Balompié	0 – 4	Celta Vigo	Albacete, Spain
		Report	29' Joseba Agirre; 45', 74' Gudelj; 85' Andrijašević	Stadium: Estadio Carlos Belmonte; Referee: José Pajares Paz

23 April 1994 35	Celta Vigo	0 – 4	Barcelona	Vigo, Spain
		Report	1', 54' Stoichkov; 55' Amor; 89' Estebaranz	Stadium: Balaídos; Referee: José María García-Aranda

1 May 1994 36	Real Zaragoza	4 – 1	Celta Vigo	Zaragoza, Spain
	Higuera 21'; Poyet 24'; Esnáider 45', 88'	Report	67' Pérez	Stadium: La Romareda; Referee: José Núñez Manrique

8 May 1994 37	Celta Vigo	4 – 0	Osasuna	Vigo, Spain
	Gudelj 21', 42'; Alejo 48'; Andrijašević 79'	Report		Stadium: Balaídos; Referee: Juan Fernández Marín

15 May 1994 38	Real Valladolid	0 – 0	Celta Vigo	Valladolid, Spain
		Report		Stadium: José Zorrilla; Referee: José Merino González

=== Copa del Rey ===
==== Third round ====
2 September 1993 First leg	Gramenet	1 – 0	Celta Vigo	Barcelona, Spain
	Romero 52'	Report		Stadium: Camp de la Verneda; Referee: Juan Fernández Marín

16 September 1993 Second leg	Celta Vigo	2 – 0 (a.e.t.)	Gramanet	Vigo, Spain
	Ratković 66'; Losada 102'	Report		Stadium: Balaídos; Referee: Clemente Rivas Fernández

Celta Vigo won 2–1 on aggregate

==== Fourth round ====
27 October 1993 First leg	Celta Vigo	4 – 0	Albacete Balompié	Vigo, Spain
	Losada 1'; Luisinho 3'; Atilano 49'; Manel 83'	Report		Stadium: Balaídos; Referee: Joaquín Urío Velázquez

4 November 1993 Second leg	Albacete Balompié	4 – 1	Celta Vigo	Albacete, Spain
	Menéndez 14'; Dos Santos 55', 75'; Morientes 90'	Report	4' (pen.) Salillas	Stadium: Estadio Carlos Belmonte; Referee: Antonio López Nieto

Celta Vigo won 5–4 on aggregate

==== Fifth round ====
8 December 1993 First leg	Talavera	1 – 2	Celta Vigo	Talavera de la Reina, Spain
	Mediavilla 57'	Report	29' Gudelj; 45' Andrijašević	Stadium: El Prado; Referee: José Rubio Valdivieso

21 December 1993 Second leg	Celta Vigo	0 – 0	Talavera	Vigo, Spain
		Report		Stadium: Balaídos; Referee: Francisco Santamaría Uzqueda

Celta Vigo won 2–1 on aggregate

==== Round of 16 ====
5 January 1994 First leg	Logroñés	1 – 0	Celta Vigo	Logroño, Spain
21:00 CET	Paco 45'	Report		Stadium: Estadio Las Gaunas; Referee: Clemente Rivas Fernández

12 January 1994 Second leg	Celta Vigo	1 – 0 (a.e.t.) (4–3 p)	Logroñés	Vigo, Spain
21:00 CET	Gudelj 5'	Report		Stadium: Balaídos; Referee: Victor José Esquinas Torres
	Penalties
			Poyatos (penalty missed); Herrero (penalty missed)

1–1 on aggregate. Celta Vigo won 4–3 on penalties

==== Quarter-finals ====
26 January 1994 First leg	Real Oviedo	1 – 0	Celta Vigo	Oviedo, Spain
20:30 CET	Janković 30'	Report		Stadium: Estadio Carlos Tartiere; Referee: José Rubio Valdivieso

2 February 1994 Second leg	Celta Vigo	5 – 0	Real Oviedo	Vigo, Spain
21:00 CET	Salillas 1'; Salva 46'; Ratković 56'; Gudelj 78'; Pérez 87'	Report		Stadium: Balaídos; Referee: Juan Ansuátegui Roca

Celta Vigo won 5–1 on aggregate

==== Semi-finals ====
16 February 1994 First leg	Celta Vigo	3 – 0	Tenerife	Vigo, Spain
21:00 CET	Gudelj 17', 31'; Salillas 80'	Report		Stadium: Balaídos; Referee: Antonio López Nieto

10 March 1994 Second leg	Tenerife	2 – 2	Celta Vigo	Santa Cruz de Tenerife, Spain
22:00 CET	Aguilera 44'; Dertycia 61'	Report	66', 73' Gudelj	Stadium: Heliodoro Rodríguez López; Referee: Manuel Díaz Vega

Celta Vigo won 5–2 on aggregate

==== Final ====
20 April 1994	Celta Vigo	0 – 0 (a.e.t.) (4–5 p)	Real Zaragoza	Madrid, Spain
21:00 CET		Report		Stadium: Estadio Vicente Calderón; Attendance: 60,000; Referee: Antonio López Nieto
	Penalties
	Andrijašević (penalty scored); Gudelj (penalty scored); Dadíe (penalty scored); Losada (penalty scored); Alejo (penalty missed)		(penalty scored) Cáceres; (penalty scored) Nayim; (penalty scored) Franco; (penalty scored) Gay; (penalty scored) Higuera
