= 1988 Copa del Rey final =

Football competition final

Copa del Rey 1988 final
- Event: 1987–88 Copa del Rey
Barcelona	Real Sociedad
1	0
- Date: 31 March 1988
- Venue: Santiago Bernabéu Stadium, Madrid
- Referee: Joaquín Ramos Marcos
- Attendance: 70,000

The 1988 Copa del Rey final was the 86th final of the King's Cup. The final was played at Santiago Bernabéu Stadium in Madrid, on 31 March 1988, being won by Barcelona, who beat Real Sociedad 1–0.

== Match details ==
31 March 1988
20:30 CET

Barcelona	1–0	Real Sociedad
Alexanko 61'	Report (in Spanish)

Santiago Bernabéu Stadium, Madrid
Attendance: 70,000
Referee: Joaquín Ramos

Barcelona

Real Sociedad

GK	1	(Spain) Andoni Zubizarreta
DF	2	(Spain) Gerardo
DF	3	(Spain) Migueli
DF	6	(Spain) José Ramón Alexanko (c)
DF	4	(Spain) Julio Alberto
MF	11	(Spain) Urbano
MF	9	(Spain) Roberto
MF	8	(West Germany) Bernd Schuster	(yellow card) 88'
MF	5	(Spain) Víctor		(substituted off) 56'
FW	7	(Spain) Francisco José Carrasco	(yellow card) 34'
FW	10	(England) Gary Lineker
Substitutes:
DF	12	(Spain) Manolo
GK	13	(Spain) Urruti
MF	14	(Spain) Ramón Calderé		(substituted on) 56'
MF	15	(Spain) Ángel Pedraza
FW	16	(Spain) Paco Clos
Manager:
(Spain) Luis Aragonés

GK	1	(Spain) Luis Arconada (c)	(yellow card) 74'
DF	2	(Spain) Santi Bakero		(substituted off) 64'
DF	5	(Spain) Alberto Górriz	(yellow card) 83'
DF	4	(Spain) Juan Antonio Larrañaga
DF	6	(Spain) Agustín Gajate
DF	3	(Spain) Luis López Rekarte	(yellow card) 39'
MF	7	(Spain) José Miguel Zúñiga		(substituted off) 70'
MF	8	(Spain) José Mari Bakero
MF	10	(Spain) Jesús María Zamora
FW	9	(Spain) Loren
FW	11	(Spain) Txiki Begiristain
Substitutes:
DF	12	(Spain) Luis Dadíe
GK	13	(Spain) José González
FW	14	(Spain) Miguel Ángel Fuentes		(substituted on) 70'
MF	15	(Spain) Jokin Uria		(substituted on) 64'
MF	16	(Spain) Juan María Mujika
Manager:
(Wales) John Benjamin Toshack

Match rules

- 90 minutes.
- 30 minutes of extra-time if necessary.
- Penalty shoot-out if scores still level.
- Five named substitutes.
- Maximum of two substitutions.
