= José Zúñiga =

José Zúñiga may refer to:

- José Zúñiga (actor) (born 1965), Honduran-American actor
- José Zúñiga (artist) (born 1937), Mexican painter
- José Alfredo Zúñiga (born 1985), Mexican boxer
- José de Züñiga (1755–after 1806), Spanish soldier and settler
- José Miguel Zúñiga (born 1962), Spanish footballer
