= Miguel Ángel Portugal =

Spanish footballer and manager (born 1955)

Personal information
- Full name: Miguel Ángel Portugal Vicario
- Date of birth: 28 November 1955 (age 70)
- Place of birth: Quintanilla de las Viñas, Spain
- Height: 1.84 m (6 ft 0 in)
- Position: Midfielder

Youth career
- Burgos

Senior career*
Years	Team	Apps	(Gls)
1975–1979	Burgos	24	(2)
1977–1978	→ Mirandés (loan)		
1979–1983	Real Madrid	27	(1)
1982	→ Cádiz (loan)	12	(1)
1983–1984	Rayo Vallecano	15	(0)
1984–1985	Castellón	19	(2)
1985–1987	Real Burgos	68	(5)
1987–1988	Valladolid	3	(0)
1988–1991	Córdoba	65	(9)
Total		233	(20)

International career
1979	Spain U23	2	(0)
1979	Spain amateur	6	(3)

Managerial career
- 1996–1997: Arandina
- 1997: Real Madrid C
- 1997–1999: Real Madrid B
- 1999: Toledo
- 2003–2004: Córdoba
- 2005–2006: Real Madrid B
- 2006–2007: Racing Santander
- 2009–2011: Racing Santander
- 2012–2013: Bolívar
- 2014: Atlético Paranaense
- 2015–2016: Valladolid
- 2016: CS Constantine
- 2017–2018: Delhi Dynamos
- 2018: Granada
- 2018: Pune City
- 2018–2019: Jorge Wilstermann
- 2020: Royal Pari
- 2021–2022: Royal Pari
- 2023: Guabirá
- * Club domestic league appearances and goals

Miguel Angel Portugal Vicario (born 28 November 1955) is a Spanish retired footballer who played as a midfielder, and is a current manager.

He totalled 66 games and four goals in La Liga for four clubs including Real Madrid, for whom he played a part in their league and Copa del Rey double in 1979–80.

In a managerial career lasting a quarter of a century, Portugal had two spells at Racing Santander in the top flight. From the 2010s, he had brief stints abroad in Bolivia, Brazil, Algeria and India, winning a league title for Club Bolívar in 2013.

== Playing career ==
Portugal was born in Quintanilla de las Viñas, Province of Burgos. During his career he played for Burgos CF, CD Mirandés, Real Madrid, Cádiz CF, Rayo Vallecano, CD Castellón, Real Burgos CF, Real Valladolid and Córdoba CF.

With the La Liga powerhouse, Portugal remained four years (one loaned at Cádiz), winning the double in his first year but only amassing a combined 27 top division appearances during his spell.

== Coaching career ==
=== Early career ===
Portugal started managing in the mid-90s, returning to Real Madrid to be in charge of its C and B-sides. In 1999, he started in the second division with CD Toledo, but was fired after only a couple of months.

After some years out of football, Portugal coached former club Córdoba also in the second level, returning to Real Madrid Castilla in 2005–06 following the December promotion to the first team of Juan Ramón López Caro. On 6 July 2006 he succeeded López Caro once again, now at Racing de Santander, helping the Cantabrians to a final tenth place in the top flight.

Portugal served as technical director of Real Madrid subsequently. In November 2008, he was set to take over at the club as coach following the sacking of Bernd Schuster, but president Ramón Calderón preferred Juande Ramos instead.

On 19 November 2009, Portugal returned to Racing on a two-year deal following the dismissal of Juan Carlos Mandiá, as the side had only collected one point in five home matches. In early February 2011, even though the team was placed above the relegation zone in the top division – eventually managing to stay afloat – he was sacked by new club owner, Ahsan Ali Syed from India.

=== Abroad ===
In June 2012, Portugal moved abroad for the first time when he was appointed at Club Bolívar in Bolivia. In his debut season, the team from La Paz won the Clausura of the Bolivian Primera División; he was sacked at the turn of 2014, after the club lost the Apertura honour to rivals The Strongest on the final day of the campaign.

Portugal remained in South America, signing days later for Clube Atlético Paranaense in Brazil on a year-long contract. He resigned on 19 May.

On 21 October 2015, Portugal returned to Spain and its second division with Real Valladolid, inheriting a team from Gaizka Garitano that was in the relegation zone. He was dismissed the following 24 April after a run of one point from five games, though the side's position had improved.

Portugal was hired by CS Constantine of Algeria on a one-year deal in November 2016. He quit the following month, having made previous threats to leave his job.

On 17 July 2017, Portugal moved to the fourth continent of his career when he was hired at Delhi Dynamos FC of the Indian Super League. He finished eighth of ten teams – blaming this on a sporadic match schedule and low transfer budget– and the following 1 May he returned to Spain after being appointed manager of Granada CF.

In August 2018, Portugal was announced as the head coach of FC Pune City for the upcoming season. He was sacked on 24 October, after one draw and two losses.

On 20 December 2018, Portugal returned to Bolivia to take over at C.D. Jorge Wilstermann on a one-year deal. He left the following April by mutual consent, having suffered threats from some of the Cochabamba-based club's supporters.

Remaining in the Andean country, Portugal was appointed on a one-year contract at Royal Pari F.C. at the start of 2020. He resigned on 21 May that year, due to concerns over the resumption of the season around the COVID-19 pandemic.

On 3 August 2021, Portugal returned to Bolivia and Royal Pari, replacing sacked Christian Díaz. He was dismissed the following 28 February, after opening the new season with two wins and two draws.

== Managerial statistics ==
As of match played 26 February 2022

Managerial record by team and tenure
Team	Nat	From	To	Record					Ref.
Team	Nat	From	To	G	W	D	L	Win %	Ref.
Real Madrid C	(Spain)	1 July 1997	3 November 1997	10	5	4	1	50.00	
Real Madrid B	(Spain)	3 November 1997	3 July 1999	78	41	17	20	52.56	
Toledo	(Spain)	4 July 1999	13 October 1999	9	1	2	6	11.11	
Córdoba	(Spain)	27 October 2003	7 June 2004	32	9	10	13	28.13	
Real Madrid Castilla	(Spain)	5 December 2005	6 July 2006	27	10	4	13	37.04	
Racing Santander	(Spain)	6 July 2006	19 June 2007	40	13	14	13	32.50	
Racing Santander	(Spain)	19 November 2009	7 February 2011	58	18	16	24	31.03	
Bolívar	(Bolivia)	14 June 2012	31 December 2013	69	41	11	17	59.42	
Atlético Paranaense	(Brazil)	8 January 2014	19 May 2014	13	5	2	6	38.46	
Valladolid	(Spain)	21 October 2015	24 April 2016	26	9	9	8	34.62	
CS Constantine	(Algeria)	2 November 2016	9 December 2016	5	1	2	2	20.00	
Delhi Dynamos	(India)	29 June 2017	1 May 2018	19	5	4	10	26.32	
Granada	(Spain)	1 May 2018	4 June 2018	5	2	0	3	40.00	
Pune City	(India)	9 August 2018	26 October 2018	3	0	1	2	0.00	
Jorge Wilstermann	(Bolivia)	20 December 2018	22 April 2019	23	10	4	9	43.48	
Royal Pari	(Bolivia)	2 January 2020	21 May 2020	12	6	2	4	50.00	
Royal Pari	(Bolivia)	3 August 2021	28 February 2022	21	9	4	8	42.86	
Career Total				450	185	106	159	41.11	—

== Honours ==
=== Player ===
Real Madrid

- La Liga: 1979–80
- Copa del Rey: 1979–80

=== Manager ===
Bolívar

- Bolivian Primera División: 2012–13
