= Javier Sagarzazu =

Spanish association football player (1958–1987)

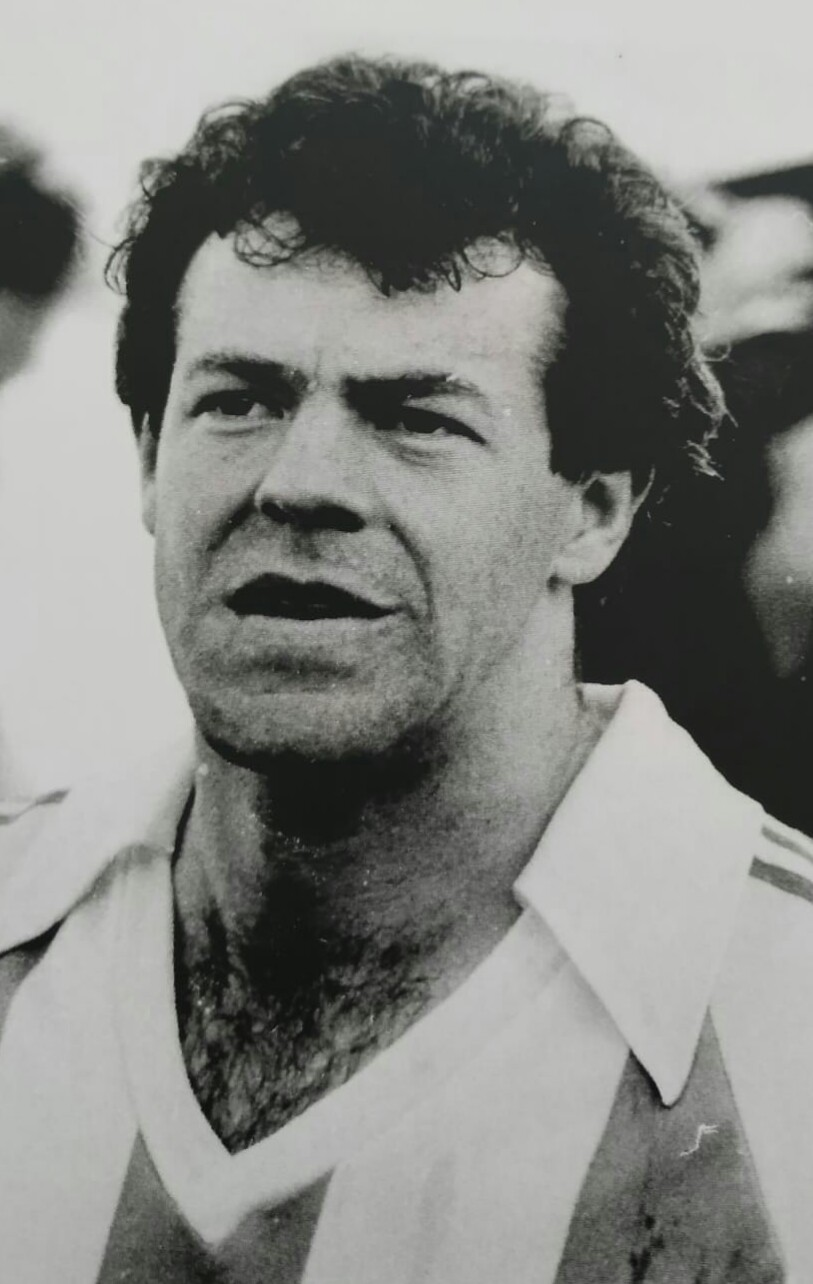

Personal information
- Full name: Javier María Sagarzazu Unanue
- Date of birth: 11 December 1958
- Place of birth: Azkoitia, Spain
- Date of death: 16 August 1987 (aged 28)
- Place of death: Carral, Spain
- Height: 1.78 m (5 ft 10 in)
- Position: Right back

Senior career*
Years	Team	Apps	(Gls)
1981–1983	San Sebastián	42	(1)
1983–1987	Real Sociedad	117	(0)
1987	Deportivo de La Coruña	0	(0)
Total		159	(1)
- * Club domestic league appearances and goals

Javier María Sagarzazu Unanue (11 December 1958 – 16 August 1987) was a Spanish footballer who played as a right back.

He played 155 total matches for Real Sociedad, including four regular seasons in La Liga and winning the Copa del Rey in 1987. He died suddenly aged 28, on his way to a game for Deportivo de La Coruña.

== Career ==
Born in Azkoitia in the Basque Country, Sagarzazu came through the ranks of nearby Real Sociedad. He played for the reserve team San Sebastián CF in the Segunda División B. His first involvement with the first team came on 20 April 1983, when the team went to Hamburger SV in the semi-finals of the European Cup with several key players absent. His first-team debut came on 8 June in the second leg of the second round of the Copa de la Liga away to RCD Español, playing the last ten minutes of extra time as a substitute for José Diego as the game ended goalless and La Real won in a penalty shootout; manager Alberto Ormaetxea said "he is an interesting boy who will be with me next season".

Sagarzazu made his La Liga debut on 3 September 1983 as the new season began with a 3–1 loss at Real Murcia. He became a mainstay in the team, with his final game being the 1987 Copa del Rey final which his team won on penalties against Atlético Madrid at La Romareda on 27 June. He received only six yellow cards in his 155-game spell at the club.

Sagarzazu was discarded by manager John Toshack, who liked him as a professional and a person but wanted full-backs who fit his tactical model. According to teammates, he was the only unhappy face at their cup celebrations, and burst into tears upon realising he had played his final game.

== Death ==
Sagarzazu transferred to Deportivo de La Coruña of the Segunda División. On 16 August 1987, as the club were travelling to a pre-season friendly in nearby Carral, he fell unconscious; he was taken by car to the town and given cardiac stimulants by a doctor, recovering his breathing but not his consciousness. At A Coruña hospital he was declared dead of edema in the brain and lung.

Sagarzazu's widow gave birth to a son months after his death, who was given his name. On 22 June 1993, the five-year-old boy scored the symbolic last goal at Real Sociedad's Atotxa Stadium.

The events affected Deportivo, who narrowly avoided relegation from the 1987–88 Segunda División.

== Honours ==
Real Sociedad

- Copa del Rey: 1986–87
