= Jokin Uria =

Spanish association football player

Personal information
- Full name: Jokin Uria Lekuona
- Date of birth: 12 February 1965 (age 61)
- Place of birth: Lezo, Spain
- Height: 1.79 m (5 ft 10 in)
- Position: Left back

Senior career*
Years	Team	Apps	(Gls)
1984–1987	Real Sociedad B	78	(3)
1985–1997	Real Sociedad	223	(9)
1997–1998	Eibar	31	(2)
Total		332	(14)
- * Club domestic league appearances and goals

Jokin Uria Lekuona (born 12 February 1965) is a Spanish former footballer who played as a left back.

He spent most of his career with Real Sociedad, making 273 appearances across all competitions, including in 11 seasons of La Liga. He played in their team that won the Copa del Rey in 1987.

== Career ==
Born in Lezo in the Basque Country, Uría began his career at nearby Real Sociedad. He began playing for the reserve team, San Sebastián, in the Segunda División B. He made his first-team debut on 19 September 1985 in the first round of the Copa del Rey, coming on as a 76th-minute substitute for Imanol Urbieta in a 3–0 win away to fellow Basques Amorebieta.

On 17 December 1986, Uria made his La Liga debut in a 1–0 loss to Cádiz. That season he was part of their team that won the Copa del Rey, though he did not play in the final; he came on as a substitute in the 1988 edition, which his team lost by a single goal to Barcelona.

In 1992–93, Uria was Real Sociedad's most used player over 36 games. Manager John Toshack played him in his usual left back position if the team were playing with four defenders, though he was also used as a left-sided centre-back if there were five; he was occasionally also played in central midfield. He scored four times, including two in a 4–2 win at Sporting Gijón on 7 February, and was given the Player of the Year award by regional newspaper El Diario Vasco in the club's final season at the Atotxa Stadium.

In late August 1997, Uria signed for Eibar in the Segunda División, also from his native region. He retired after one season at the club.
