= Lluís Sitjar =

Majorcan sports and political leader

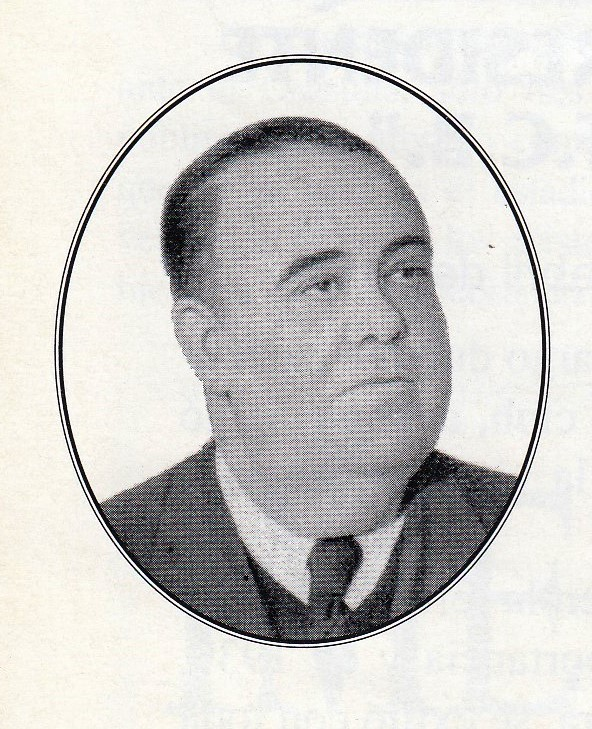
- Born: Lluís Sitjar Castellà; 16 August 1900; Palma, Balearic Islands, Spain
- Died: 21 December 1956 (aged 56); Palma, Balearic Islands, Spain
- Citizenship: Spanish
- Known for: President of RCD Mallorca (1926–1927), (1930–1931), (1943–1946)

Lluís Sitjar Castellà (Palma, 16 August 1900 – Íd., 21 December 1956) was a Majorcan sports and political leader from Palma (Mallorca, Balearic Islands, Spain). He is known for having been president of CD Mallorca and giving the name to his stadium, as well as for having been a member of Falange Española and being implicated in the executions of political prisoners during Spanish Civil War.

== Biography ==
Sitjar was from a landed family, owners of the possession (a type of rural construction in Mallorca) of Es Monjos (Porreres) and also of the possession of Alcoraia, in the neighboring municipality of Montuiri), which allowed him to enjoy a comfortable economic position throughout his life, in addition to being able to intervene in various spheres of Majorcan social and political life, especially in Palma (where he was born and lived) and Porreres (where he was from).

Initial relevance was achieved in the sporting field, especially through the Real Club Deportivo Mallorca. He was first a member of the board of directors, between 1924 and 1926, when the club was known as Real Sociedad Alfonso XIII FC. On 24 June 1926, he was unanimously elected president to replacing Antoni Moner Giral, although his mandate barely lasted a year, since he was replaced on 19 June 1927 and relegated again to member. On 10 November 1930, Sitjar returned to the presidency and during the mandate, coinciding with the proclamation of the Second Spanish Republic, the club changed the name to Club Deportivo Mallorca on 14 April 1931. A month later he was replaced as president by Antoni Parietti Coll.

During the Second Republic, he joined the Partit Regionalista de Mallorca (PRM) and was active in political activity of the time. Thus, between 1933 and 1936 he was a councilor of the Palma City Council and maintained an important presence in Porreres, because his family background. On 4 June 1933 suffered an attack in Porreras when he was leaving Sunday mass when he was shot by Andreu Obrador, Nas de Xot, a boatman of humble origins, due to personal differences. As a result, a bullet lodged in his palate, but he managed to survive.

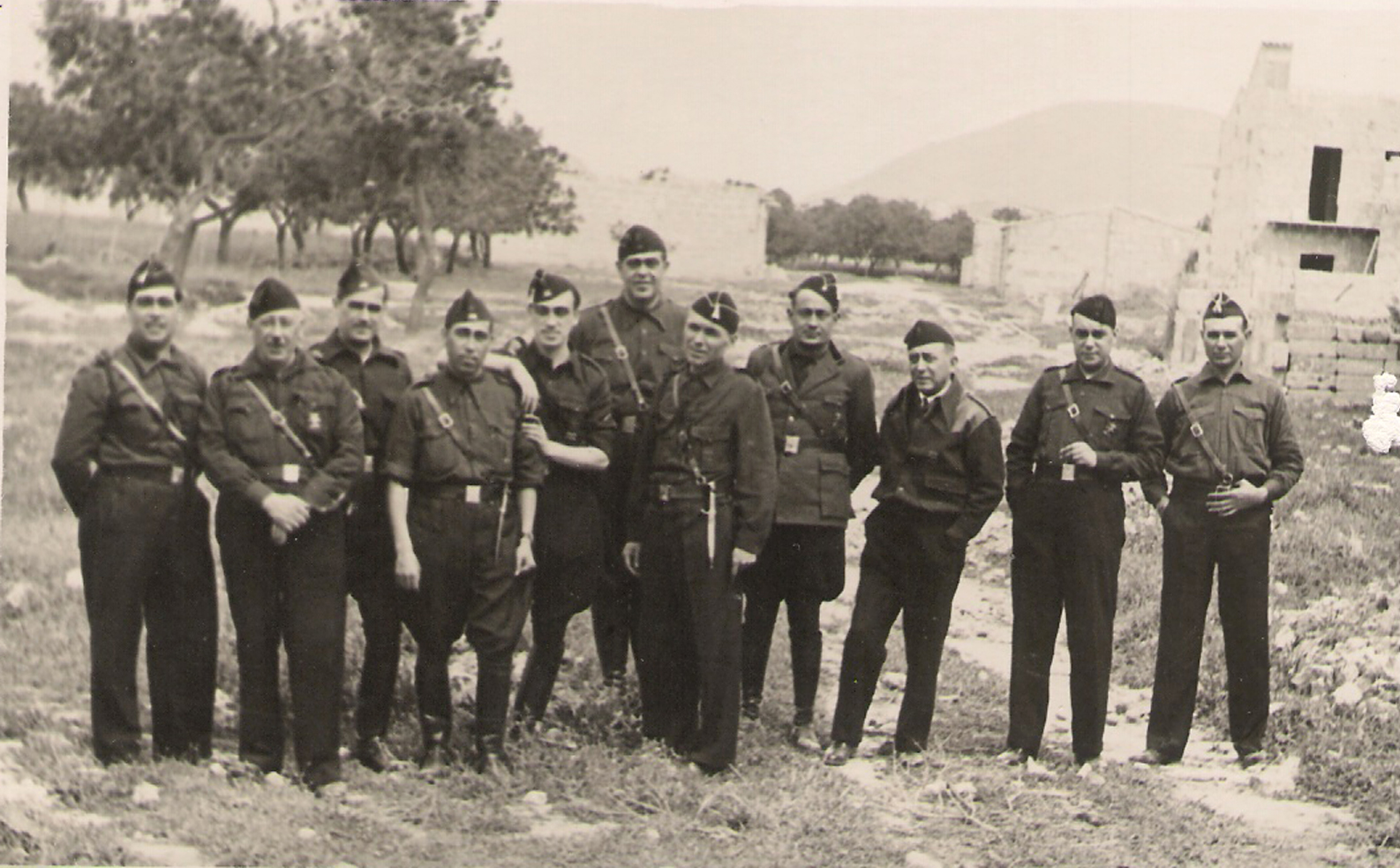
Lluís Sitjar (tallest, sixth from the left) in the uniform of Falange Española during the Civil War

When the Spanish coup of July 1936 triumphed, Sitjar joined Falange Española. On September and October 1936, with the appointments in Mallorca of Mateo Torres Bestard and Francisco Barrado Zorrilla as Civil Governor and Head of Falange Security respectively, the repression against trade unionists and members of left-wing parties intensified, but more rapidly and more secretly than had been carried out during the first months of the war. Thus, on a regular basis, groups of prisoners were officially released from Palma prisons; but in reality squads of Falangists took them out to be shot. One of the main places of execution was Porreres, where prisoners were executed on the walls of the Oratorio de la Santa Creu and then buried in mass graves in the local cemetery. Given the influence of Sitjar in the population, both because of his political and economic ascendancy and because of his membership in the Falange, he was a character involved in the bloody events that took place.

Once the Civil War was over, Sitjar was again Palma councilor between 1940 and 1943. On 3 July 1943, he returned to occupy the presidency of CD Mallorca, at a time of institutional and sporting anxiety for the club. During his tenure, which lasted until 1946, the team achieved promotion for the first time to Segunda División in 1944 and promoted the construction of a new playing field: Es Fortí, which was inaugurated on 22 September 1945. This was one of his last public appearances, as he suffered from polyneuropathy that gradually undermined his health. When he resigned from his position in 1946 he did not hold the presidency again but he continued to be up to date and actively participate in the social life of the club, especially in times of economic and institutional crisis that could suppose the demise of the entity.

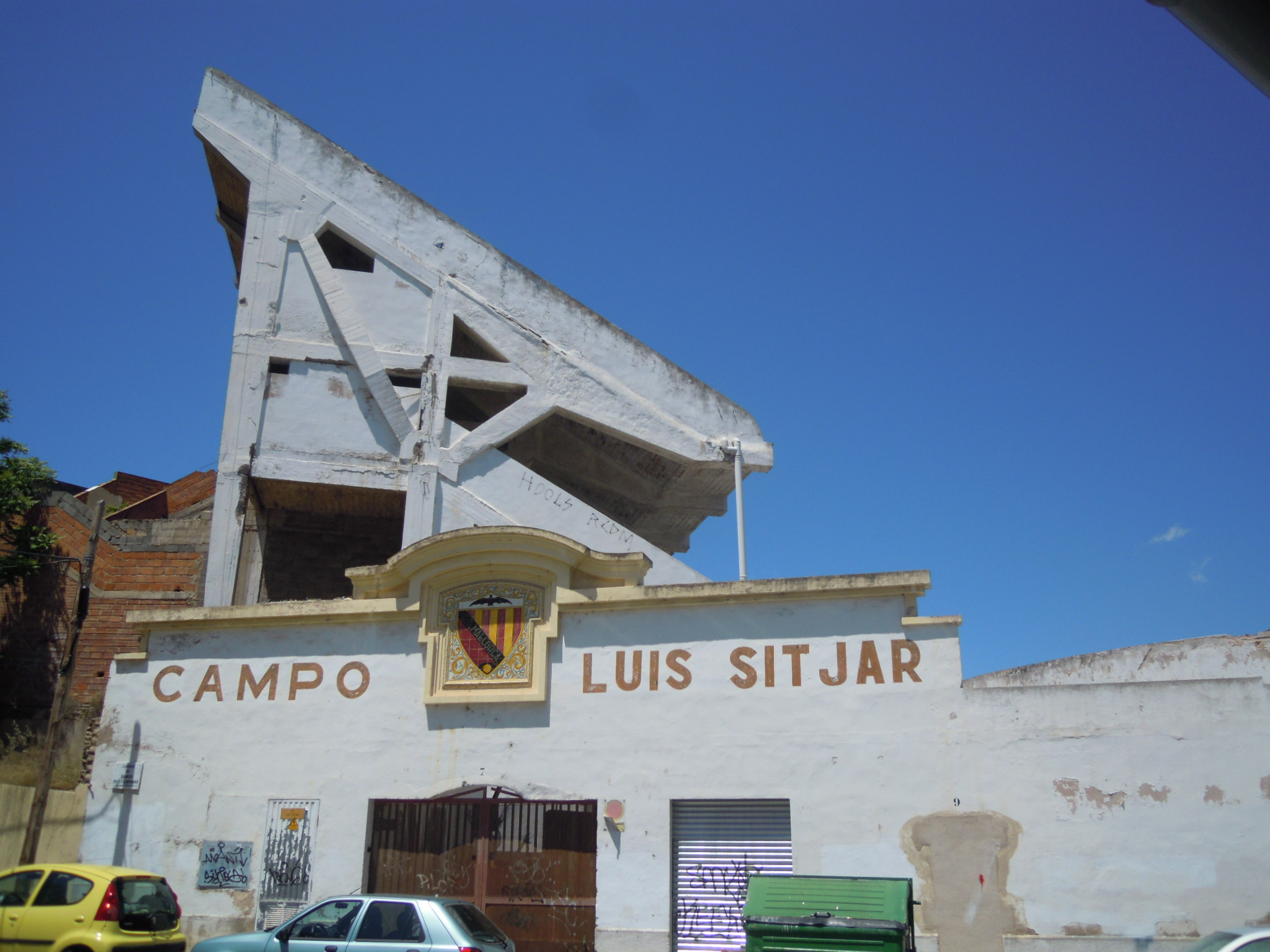
Side entrance of the disappeared Lluís Sitjar Stadium

On 11 June 1955, RCD Mallorca decided to rename Es Fortí as Luís Sitjar Stadium in his honour. He died shortly after, on 21 December 1956, after having spent the last thirteen years of life in a wheelchair due to polyneuropathy.

Fifty years after his death, RCD Mallorca decided to name an animation stand after him in the current playing field of the club, the Son Moix Stadium. The Grada Lluís Sitjar was inaugurated on 6 December 2015, in a match against Albacete Balompié (2–0).

== Bibliography ==
- Garí Salleras, Bartomeu (2007). La guerra civil a Porreres (in Catalan). Documenta Balear. ISBN 978-84-96841-42-0.
- Garí Salleras, Bartomeu (2019). La repressió feixista a Mallorca durant la Guerra Civil i la postguerra (1936–1945) (in Catalan). Lleonard Muntaner. ISBN 978-84-17833-21-3.
- Vidal Perelló, Miquel; Vidal Reynés, Jordi (2005). Història del RCD Mallorca (1916–2004) (in Catalan). Documenta Balear. ISBN 84-96376-16-8.
- Vidal Perelló, Miquel; Vidal Reynés, Jordi (2016). Un siglo con el RCD Mallorca (1916–2016) (in Catalan). Comisión Centenario del Real Mallorca. ISBN 978-84-608-7936-7.
