= 1987 Copa del Rey final =

Copa del Rey 1987 final
- Event: 1986–87 Copa del Rey
| Real Sociedad | Atlético Madrid |
| 2 | 2 |
- After extra time Real Sociedad won 4–2 on penalties
- Date: 27 June 1987
- Venue: La Romareda, Zaragoza
- Referee: Joaquín Ramos Marcos
- Attendance: 37,000

The 1987 Copa del Rey final was the 85th final of the Spanish cup competition, the Copa del Rey. The final was played at La Romareda in Zaragoza on 27 June 1987. The game was won by Real Sociedad 4–2 on penalties, after a 2–2 draw following extra time.

== Details ==
27 June 1987
20:30 CET

| Real Sociedad | 2–2 (a.e.t.) | Atlético Madrid |
|---|---|---|
| López Ufarte 9'; Txiki Beguiristain 36' | Report | Da Silva 25'; Rubio 74' |
Penalties
| Bakero (penalty scored); Mujika (penalty scored); M. Begiristain (penalty scored); Larrañaga (penalty scored) | 4–2 | (penalty scored) Rubio; (penalty missed) Da Silva; (penalty scored) Landáburu; (penalty missed) Quique Ramos |

La Romareda, Zaragoza
Attendance: 37,000
Referee: Joaquín Ramos Marcos

| Real Sociedad | Atlético Madrid |

Real Sociedad:
| GK | 1 | (Spain) Luis Arconada (c) |
| DF | 2 | (Spain) Javier Sagarzazu |
| DF | 5 | (Spain) Alberto Górriz | (yellow card) 101' |
| DF | 7 | (Spain) Luis Dadíe |
| DF | 6 | (Spain) Agustín Gajate |
| DF | 3 | (Spain) Luis López Rekarte | (yellow card) 54' |
| MF | 11 | (Spain) Roberto López Ufarte | | (substituted off) 104' |
| MF | 4 | (Spain) Juan Antonio Larrañaga |
| MF | 10 | (Spain) Jesús María Zamora | (yellow card) 37' | (substituted off) 86' |
| MF | 9 | (Spain) Txiki Begiristain |
| FW | 8 | (Spain) José Mari Bakero |
Substitutes:
| MF | 12 | (Spain) Martín Begiristain | | (substituted on) 104' |
| GK | 13 | (Spain) José González |
| MF | 14 | (Spain) Javier Zubillaga |
| MF | 15 | (Spain) Juan María Mujika | | (substituted on) 86' |
| FW | 16 | (Spain) Loren |
Manager:
(Wales) John Toshack

Atlético Madrid:
| GK | 1 | (Spain) Abel Resino |
| DF | 2 | (Spain) Tomás |
| DF | 5 | (Spain) Miguel Ángel Ruiz (c) |
| DF | 4 | (Spain) Sergio Morgado | (yellow card) 21' |
| DF | 3 | (Spain) Quique Ramos |
| MF | 6 | (Spain) Julio Prieto |
| MF | 10 | (Spain) Jesús Landáburu |
| MF | 8 | (Spain) Marina | | (substituted off) 56' |
| FW | 7 | (Spain) Pedro Uralde | | (substituted off) 86' |
| FW | 9 | (Uruguay) Jorge da Silva |
| FW | 11 | (Spain) Juan José Rubio |
Substitutes:
| DF | 12 | (Spain) Juan Carlos Arteche |
| GK | 13 | (Spain) Agustín Elduayen |
| DF | 14 | (Spain) Clemente Villaverde |
| MF | 15 | (Spain) Quique Setién | | (substituted on) 86' |
| FW | 16 | (Spain) Julio Salinas | | (substituted on) 56' |
Manager:
(Spain) Luis Aragonés

MATCH RULES

- 90 minutes.
- 30 minutes of extra-time if necessary.
- Penalty shoot-out if scores still level.
- Five named substitutes.
- Maximum of two substitutions.

Copa del Rey
1986–87 Winners
Real Sociedad
1st Title
