= Atlético Valdemoro =

- Full name: Club Atlético Valdemoro
- Founded: 1966
- Dissolved: 2017
- Ground: Municipal, Valdemoro, Madrid, Spain
- Capacity: 3,000
- Chairman: (Spain) Antonio Baeza
- Manager: (Spain) Raúl Pérez
- 2016–17: Tercera de Aficionados – Group 10, retired
- Website: https://web.archive.org/web/20081205114212/http://www.clubatleticovaldemoro.es/
Home colours	Away colours

Club Atlético Valdemoro was a Spanish football club based in Valdemoro, in the autonomous community of Madrid. Founded in 1966 and dissolved in 2017, it last played in Tercera de Aficionados – Group 10, holding home games at Estadio Municipal de Valdemoro, with a capacity for 3,000 spectators.

== History ==
Atlético Valdemoro' was founded in 1966 under the name Agrupación Deportiva Valdemoro. It spent its entire existence fluctuating between Tercera División and the regional leagues, appearing in the Segunda División B promotion playoffs in 1990–91.

In the Copa del Rey, Valdemoro played against the likes of Real Betis and Atlético de Madrid, both in the 80s.

== Season to season ==
Season	Tier	Division	Place	Copa del Rey
1967–68	6	3ª Reg.	9th	
1968–69	6	3ª Reg.	3rd	
1969–70	6	3ª Reg.	1st	
1970–71	5	2ª Reg.	3rd	
1971–72	5	2ª Reg.	2nd	
1972–73	4	1ª Reg.	11th	
1973–74	4	Reg. Pref.	6th	
1974–75	4	Reg. Pref.	5th	
1975–76	4	Reg. Pref.	10th	
1976–77	5	1ª Reg.	5th	
1977–78	5	Reg. Pref.	4th	
1978–79	5	Reg. Pref.	2nd	
1979–80	4	3ª	18th	Second round
1980–81	4	3ª	19th	
1981–82	5	Reg. Pref.	16th	
1982–83	6	1ª Reg.	3rd	
1983–84	5	Reg. Pref.	9th	
1984–85	5	Reg. Pref.	1st	
1985–86	4	3ª	3rd	
1986–87	4	3ª	9th	Third round

Season	Tier	Division	Place	Copa del Rey
1987–88	4	3ª	15th	
1988–89	4	3ª	14th	
1989–90	4	3ª	4th	
1990–91	4	3ª	3rd	First round
1991–92	4	3ª	20th	First round
1992–93	5	Reg. Pref.	5th	
1993–94	5	Reg. Pref.	9th	
1994–95	5	Reg. Pref.	3rd	
1995–96	4	3ª	11th	
1996–97	4	3ª	11th	
1997–98	4	3ª	21st	
1998–99	5	Reg. Pref.	13th	
1999–2000	5	Reg. Pref.	10th	
2000–01	5	Reg. Pref.	2nd	
2001–02	4	3ª	20th	
2002–03	5	Reg. Pref.	13th	
2003–04	5	Reg. Pref.	6th	
2004–05	5	Reg. Pref.	8th	
2005–06	5	Reg. Pref.	12th	
2006–07	5	Reg. Pref.	17th	

Season	Tier	Division	Place	Copa del Rey
2007–08	6	1ª Reg.	1st	
2008–09	5	Reg. Pref.	9th	
2009–10	5	Pref.	14th	
2010–11	5	Pref.	17th	
2011–12	6	1ª Afic.	14th	
2012–13	6	1ª Afic.	18th	
2013–14	7	2ª Afic.	17th	
2014–15	8	3ª Afic.	9th	
2015–16	8	3ª Afic.	8th	
2016–17	8	3ª Afic.	(R)	

- 13 seasons in Tercera División

== Segunda División B Promotion Playoffs ==
=== 1990–91 ===
Team	Pld	W	D	L	GF	GA	GD	Pts
Lalín	6	4	0	2	16	6	+10	8
Zamora	6	4	0	2	12	7	+5	8
Valdemoro	6	2	0	4	8	15	-7	4
Pumarín	6	2	0	4	6	14	-8	4

Valdemoro	3–2	Lalín
Valdemoro	3–1	Pumarín
Valdemoro	0–2	Zamora
Lalín	5–0	Valdemoro
Pumarín	2–1	Valdemoro
Zamora	3–1	Valdemoro

== Uniforms ==
- First kit: Red shirt with white stripes, blue shorts and red socks.
- Alternative kit: White shirt, blue shorts and white socks.
