= Martín Begiristain =

Spanish football player (born 1965)

Personal information
- Full name: Martín Begiristain Arruti
- Date of birth: 13 June 1965 (age 61)
- Place of birth: Tolosa, Spain
- Height: 1.77 m (5 ft 10 in)
- Position: Forward

Youth career
- Real Sociedad

Senior career*
Years	Team	Apps	(Gls)
1982–1988	San Sebastián	111	(41)
1984–1989	Real Sociedad	14	(3)
1988	→ Eibar (loan)	10	(1)
1989–1990	Elche	19	(2)
1990–1993	Alavés	63	(24)
Total		217	(71)
- * Club domestic league appearances and goals

Martín Begiristain Arruti (born 13 June 1965) is a Spanish former footballer who played as a forward.

He spent most of his career with Real Sociedad, though mostly in the reserve team. He played 17 games and scored 3 goals for the first team, winning the Copa del Rey in 1987. He also played 29 matches and scored 3 goals in the Segunda División for Eibar and Elche.

== Career ==
Born in Tolosa in the Basque Country, Begiristain began his career at Real Sociedad, playing in the reserve team. His first-team debut came in La Liga on 9 September 1984 in a 1–0 home loss to Málaga.

On 14 June 1987, Real Sociedad manager John Toshack put out a younger team in order to rest his players for the 1987 Copa del Rey final. The team were criticised in Mundo Deportivo for playing in the same system as the regular players despite not being equipped for it, with Begiristain only "sporadically" helping fellow forward Ricardo Arrien. Begiristain scored his first goal for the team with a penalty kick in a 5–1 defeat.

In the cup final against the same team on 27 June 1987, Begiristain came on as a substitute for goalscorer Roberto López Ufarte shortly before half time in extra time. The game ended 2–2 and Begiristain scored his attempt in the penalty shootout victory.

In October 1988, Begiristain was loaned to fellow Gipuzkoa team Eibar in the Segunda División, due to injuries in their attacking sector. He made his debut on 23 October by scoring the opening goal of a 2–2 home draw with Tenerife, his only goal of ten games in the spell.

Begiristain played only four more first-team games in his last two years at La Real, scoring twice. He netted from a header in a 4–2 loss at Sporting Gijón on 15 January 1989, and one in a 2–1 win in the reverse fixture on the last day of the season.

In July 1989, Begiristain's Real Sociedad contract ended and he signed a two-year deal at second-tier Elche. He later returned to his native region and signed for Deportivo Alavés of the Segunda División B, scoring on his debut on 16 December 1990 in a 2–2 draw away to Numancia. He took part in the team's unsuccessful playoff campaign in his first season, scoring in a defeat to Compostela.
