= José Antonio Pikabea =

Spanish footballer

Personal information
- Full name: José Antonio Pikabea Larrarte
- Date of birth: 26 September 1970 (age 56)
- Place of birth: Hondarribia, Spain
- Height: 1.79 m (5 ft 10 in)
- Position: Centre-back

Youth career
- Hondarribia FT
- 1987–1988: Real Sociedad

Senior career*
Years	Team	Apps	(Gls)
1988–1992	San Sebastián	88	(4)
1992–2003	Real Sociedad	292	(10)
Total		380	(14)

International career
1993–1999	Basque Country	7	(0)
- * Club domestic league appearances and goals

José Antonio Pikabea Larrarte (born 26 September 1970), also known as Kote, is a Spanish former professional footballer who played as a central defender.

== Club career ==
Born in Hondarribia, Basque Country, Pikabea joined Real Sociedad's youth system at 17, going on to spend four seasons with their reserves. On 8 March 1992 he made his La Liga debut, playing 21 minutes in a 2–1 away win against Valencia CF; his first appearance was handed by John Toshack.

Still under the Welsh manager, Pikabea became an undisputed starter for the Gipuzkoa side from the 1992–93 campaign onwards. In 1997–98, he only missed two league games and totalled 3,214 minutes as the team finished in third position, thus qualifying for the UEFA Cup.

During most of his spell, Pikabea often partnered another Real Sociedad youth graduate, Loren. A continuous loss of form made him appear in just six matches in his penultimate season (again with Toshack, who was having his third stint as head coach), and none whatsoever in his last, with French Raynald Denoueix on the bench. He retired in June 2003 at the age of 32, having taken part in 313 competitive games for his only club.

== See also ==
- List of one-club men
