= Atilano Vecino =

Spanish association football player

Atilano
Personal information
- Full name: Atilano Vecino Escuadra
- Date of birth: 18 August 1958 (age 68)
- Place of birth: Coreses, Spain
- Height: 1.80 m (5 ft 11 in)
- Position: Right back

Youth career
- –1978: CD Coreses

Senior career*
Years	Team	Apps	(Gls)
1978–1982	Zamora	74	(3)
1979–1980	→ Gimnástico de Melilla		
1982–1994	Celta Vigo	332	(7)
Total		406	(10)
- * Club domestic league appearances and goals

Atilano Vecino Escuadra (born 18 August 1958), known simply as Atilano, is a Spanish retired footballer who played as a right back. He spent the vast majority of his career with Celta Vigo, with whom he made 183 appearances in La Liga, scoring five goals. He later worked on the coaching staff and in the press office for Celta.

== Playing career ==
=== Zamora ===
Atilano was born in Coreses in the province of Zamora, Castile and León, and began his career with hometown club CD Coreses. He then joined Zamora CF in the provincial capital, making his debut in Segunda División B on 19 May 1979 in a 1–1 away draw with Cultural Leonesa at Estadio Antonio Amilivia, in which he came on as a substitute. He spent the 1979–80 season with Gimnástico de Melilla in the Tercera División, before returning to Zamora for the next two years. The club were relegated at the end of the 1981–82 season for failing to pay their debts.

=== Celta Vigo ===
Celta Vigo began pursuing Atilano in the summer of 1982, following Zamora's forced relegation. However, a failure to negotiate a fee, as well as the advice of Celta's doctors, put a stop to the move. He finally made the move on 13 October that year, in a deal which cost Celta 4.5 million pesetas. He was able to move after the start of the season due to Zamora's amateur status. He made his La Liga debut for Los Celestes on 31 October, in a 1–0 win over Real Betis at Estadio Benito Villamarín. He was given the task of marking Betis legend Joaquín Parra, and was widely praised for his performance. He scored his first goal for the club on 21 November in a 2–2 away draw at Camp Nou, as Celta took on a Barcelona side featuring new signing Diego Maradona.

Atilano would spend twelve seasons with Los Celestes, with his performances earning comparisons to legendary Celta right backs of the past. He experienced the lows of relegation in 1982–83, 1985–86 and 1989–90, but also helped the club return to the top flight on each occasion. They earned promotion in 1984–85, 1986–87 and 1991–92, the last as Segunda División champions. Perhaps the finest achievement was saved for his final season with the club, as he helped them reach the 1994 Copa del Rey Final, although he did not play in the final itself as Celta lost on penalties to Real Zaragoza.

Atilano retired from football in 1994 as he neared his 36th birthday. His final match came on 1 May 1994 as Los Celestes suffered a 4–1 away defeat to Zaragoza at La Romareda, in which Atilano was sent off with nine minutes remaining. This was not a fitting end to his Celta career, which had seen him make 392 appearances for Los Celestes in all competitions, scoring eight goals. At the time, this total put him second on the all-time appearances list for Celta, behind only the legendary Manolo. He has only recently been overtaken by current Celta players Hugo Mallo and Iago Aspas.

== Retirement ==
After retiring, Atilano continued to work for Celta. He held various roles, including working on the coaching staff and in the press office.

== Honours ==
Celta Vigo

- Segunda División: 1991–92
- Copa del Rey runners-up: 1993–94

== Career statistics ==
As of 8 March 2021

Club	Season	League			Cup		Other		Total	
Club	Season	Division	Apps	Goals	Apps	Goals	Apps	Goals	Apps	Goals
Zamora	1978–79	Segunda División B	2	0	0	0	–		2	0
Zamora	1980–81	Segunda División B	36	2	2	0	–		38	2
Zamora	1981–82	Segunda División B	36	1	–		–		36	1
Zamora	1982–83	Tercera División	?	?	2	0	–		2	0
Zamora	Total		74	3	4	0	0	0	78	3
Gimnástico de Melilla	1979–80	Tercera División	?	?	2	0	–		2	0
Celta Vigo	1982–83	La Liga	24	2	0	0	2	0	26	2
Celta Vigo	1983–84	Segunda División	28	0	2	0	2	0	32	0
Celta Vigo	1984–85	Segunda División	34	1	5	0	1	0	40	1
Celta Vigo	1985–86	La Liga	30	0	9	0	2	0	41	0
Celta Vigo	1986–87	Segunda División	40	1	3	0	–		43	1
Celta Vigo	1987–88	La Liga	33	1	7	0	–		40	1
Celta Vigo	1988–89	La Liga	34	1	6	0	–		40	1
Celta Vigo	1989–90	La Liga	35	1	5	0	–		40	1
Celta Vigo	1990–91	Segunda División	34	0	6	0	–		40	0
Celta Vigo	1991–92	Segunda División	13	0	2	0	–		15	0
Celta Vigo	1992–93	La Liga	17	0	1	0	–		18	0
Celta Vigo	1993–94	La Liga	10	0	7	1	–		17	1
Celta Vigo	Total		332	7	53	1	7	0	392	8
Career total			406	10	59	1	7	0	472	11

1. Appearances in the 1983 Copa de la Liga
2. Appearances in the 1984 Copa de la Liga Segunda División
3. Appearance in the 1985 Copa de la Liga Segunda División
4. Appearances in the 1986 Copa de la Liga
