= 1986–87 Copa del Rey =

85th Copa del Rey

Tournament details
- Country: Spain
- Teams: 141

Final positions
- Champions: Real Sociedad (1st title)
- Runners-up: Atlético Madrid

The 1986–87 Copa del Rey was the 85th staging of the Copa del Rey. The winners, Real Sociedad, qualified for the 1987–88 European Cup Winners' Cup. The competition began on 17 September 1986 and concluded on 27 June 1987 with the final.

== First round ==
17 September 1986

First round
Home	Score	Visitor	Match details	Notes
Alondras CF	1–2	CD Ourense		
Cultural de Durango	1–1 (3–4 pen.)	SD Eibar		
CD Ilicitano	1–2	Real Murcia		
CD Hospitalet	1–4	RCD Mallorca		
SD Ponferradina	0–2	Real Valladolid		
CF Viveiro	0–4	RC Celta de Vigo		
UB Conquense	1–0	Castilla CF		
Portonovo SD	1–1 (?–? pen.)	Deportivo La Coruña		
Coria CF	0–2	Real Betis		
Laredo	2–4	Racing de Santander		
Real Avilés Industrial	0–4	Sporting de Gijón		
Atlético Valdemoro	2–1	CD Leganés		
CD Santurtzi	1–2	Sestao Sport Club		
Ontinyent CF	2–1	UD Alzira		
CD Teruel	1–3	CD Logroñés		
CD Burriana	0–1	CD Castellón		
Córdoba CF	0–2	Sevilla FC		
CD Manresa	6–2	UE Figueres		
Albacete Balompié	1–0	Elche CF		
CF Gandía	2–0	CD Mestalla		
Girona CF	2–3	Barcelona Atlético Club		
Caudal Deportivo	0–1	Real Oviedo		
SD Huesca	0–1	CA Osasuna		
CFJ Mollerussa	1–2	CE Sabadell		
AEC Manlleu	4–4 (3–4 pen.)	RCD Español		
UD Pilas	0–0 (?–? pen.)	Cádiz CF		
CD Maspalomas	1–4	UD Las Palmas		
Villarreal CF	2–2 (4–3 pen.)	Valencia CF		
CD Eldense	2–0	Hércules CF		
CD San Andrés	1–4	CD Tenerife		
AD Ceuta	2–2 (?–? pen.)	Recreativo de Huelva		
RB Linense	1–1 (?–? pen.)	Xerez CD		
Granada CF	0–1	CD Málaga		
CD Alcoyano	4–0	Nules CF		
UD Salamanca	7–0	CD Toreno		
CD Ronda	1–0	CP Almería		
CF Sporting Mahonés	0–2	UD Poblense		
Gran Peña Celtista	0–1	CD Lugo		
Fabril Deportivo	0–3	CD Endesa As Pontes		
CD Mosconia	1–2	UP Langreo		
CD Oberena	1–2	Osasuna Promesas		
UE Sant Andreu	2–3	Terrassa FC		
CP Villarrobledo	1–1 (?–? pen.)	Águilas CF		
Bigastro CF	1–1 (?–? pen.)	Torrevieja CF		
Cultural y Deportiva Leonesa	2–1	SD Gimnástica Segoviana		
CA Marbella	4–1	CD Baza		
CA Malagueño	0–0 (?–? pen.)	CD Martos		
Atlético Sanluqueño CF	3–0	CD Pozoblanco		
CD Utrera	1–0	Sevilla Atlético		
UD Lanzarote	0–1	UD Las Palmas Atlético		
SD Tenisca	0–0 (?–? pen.)	CD Mensajero		
CD Badía	2–3	CD Atlético Baleares		
CD Constancia	0–1	SD Ibiza		
CD Don Benito	3–1	Moralo CP		
CP Cacereño	0–2	UD Montijo		
CF Extremadura	2–1	CD Badajoz		
Atlético Madrileño CF	2–1	AD Rayo Vallecano		
CD Alavés	1–2	Bilbao Athletic		
Cultural de León	0–2	Real Burgos CF		
CD Valdepeñas	2–3	Real Madrid Aficionados		
CD Baskonia	1–0	SD Erandio		
Atlético Monzón	2–1	CD Arnedo		
Barakaldo CF	2–1	SD Amorebieta		

Bye: San Sebastián CF, Valladolid Promesas, Atlético Astorga CF, Mallorca Atlético, CD Roquetas, UE Lleida, CD Olímpic de Xàtiva, Cartagena FC, CD Rayo Cantabria

== Second round ==
1 October 1986

Second round
Home	Score	Visitor	Match details	Notes
Sporting de Gijón	1–1 (1–3 pen.)	Racing de Santander		
CD Manresa	0–4	CE Sabadell		
Real Madrid Aficionados	1–0	Atlético Madrileño CF		
Atlético Sanluqueño CF	0–1	Cádiz CF		
Albacete Balompié	3–2	Real Murcia		
Real Burgos CF	0–3	Real Valladolid		
SD Ibiza	1–4	RCD Mallorca		
Barakaldo CF	2–3	San Sebastián CF		
CD Ourense	1–0	CD Lugo		
CD Baskonia	0–1	Real Sociedad		
Atlético Valdemoro	2–1	UB Conquense		
Atlético Monzón	0–6	CA Osasuna		
Ontinyent CF	0–1	CD Castellón		
UD Salamanca	3–0	Real Valladolid Promesas		
Atlético Astorga FC	0–3	Cultural y Deportiva Leonesa		
CD Endesa As Pontes	1–3	Celta de Vigo		
Osasuna Promesas	1–2	CD Logroñés		
SD Eibar	2–1	Sestao SC		
CD Ronda	2–3	CD Málaga		
Terrassa FC	2–1	RCD Español		
Mallorca Atlético	3–3 (4–3 pen.)	UD Poblense		
UD Las Palmas Atlético	3–0	CD Mensajero		
CF Extremadura	2–1	CD Don Benito		
Torrevieja CF	5–2	Águilas CF		
CA Malagueño	0–4	CD Roquetas		
UE Lleida	2–3	FC Barcelona Atlètic		
CD Tenerife	1–4	UD Las Palmas		
AD Ceuta	0–2	Sevilla FC		
CD Utrera	0–4	Real Betis		
CD Alcoyano	3–1	CD Olímpic de Xàtiva		
Villarreal CF	0–0 (3–0 pen.)	CF Gandía		
CD Eldense	1–1 (11–10 pen.)	Cartagena FC		
CD Rayo Cantabria	0–1	Real Oviedo CF		

Bye: Bilbao Athletic, Atlético Baleares, Atlético Marbella, UD Montijo, Real Balompédica Linense, Deportivo de La Coruña, UP Langreo.

== Third round ==
Third round
Home	Score	Visitor	Match details			Notes
Albacete Balompié	1–0	CE Sabadell FC	22 Oct 1986	Carlos Belmonte, Albacete	Rep.	
CD Alcoyano	3–0	Deportivo de La Coruña	22 Oct 1986	El Collao, Alcoy	Rep.	
Atlético Baleares	2–1	FC Barcelona Atlètic	23 Oct 1986	Balear, Palma de Mallorca	Rep.	
SD Eibar	1–0 (aet)	Sevilla FC	22 Oct 1986	Ipurua, Eibar	Rep.	
CF Extremadura	1–4	CD Logroñés	14 Oct 1986	Francisco de la Hera, Almendralejo		
UP Langreo	4–2 (aet)	Real Valladolid Deportivo	22 Oct 1986	Ganzábal, Langreo	Rep.	
UD Las Palmas Atlético	1–0	Real Oviedo CF	22 Oct 1986	Insular, Las Palmas de Gran Canaria	Rep.	
Cultural Leonesa	0–1	CD Castellón	22 Oct 1986	Antonio Amilivia, León	Rep.	
Real Balompédica Linense	1–1 (p)	CD Eldense	22 Oct 1986	La Línea, La Línea de la Concepción	Rep.	Penalties: x–x for CD Eldense
Mallorca Atlético	1–1 (p)	CD Málaga	22 Oct 1986	Lluís Sitjar, Palma de Mallorca	Rep.	Penalties: 5–4 for Mallorca Atlético
Atlético Marbella	0–0 (p)	Celta de Vigo	22 Oct 1986	Municipal, Marbella	Rep.	Penalties: 4–2 for Atlético Marbella
UD Montijo	0–1	Real Sociedad	22 Oct 1986	Municipal, Montijo	Rep.	
CD Ourense	1–1 (p)	CA Osasuna	22 Oct 1986	O Couto, Ourense	Rep.	Penalties: 0–2 for CA Osasuna
Real Madrid Aficionados	1–0	Racing de Santander	21 Oct 1986	Ciudad Deportiva, Madrid	Rep.	
CD Roquetas	0–3	Cádiz CF	22 Oct 1986	La Algaida, Roquetas de Mar	Rep.	
San Sebastián CF	1–0	Bilbao Athletic	22 Oct 1986	José Luis Orbegozo, San Sebastián		
Terrassa FC	2–3	UD Las Palmas	23 Oct 1986	Estadi Municipal, Terrassa	Rep.	
Torrevieja CF	0–2 (aet)	RCD Mallorca	22 Oct 1986	Municipal Vicente García, Torrevieja	Rep.	
Atlético Valdemoro	2–3	Real Betis	23 Oct 1986	Municipal, Valdemoro	Rep.	
Villarreal CF	2–0	UD Salamanca	22 Oct 1986	El Madrigal, Villarreal		
Bye: Athletic Bilbao, Atlético de Madrid, FC Barcelona, Real Madrid CF, Real Zaragoza.
Results of matches played: 14 October / October 22

== Fourth round ==
Fourth round
Home	Score	Visitor	Match details			Notes
Albacete Balompié	1–2	CA Osasuna	5 Nov 1986	Carlos Belmonte, Albacete	Rep.	
CD Alcoyano	0–0 (p)	Cádiz CF	5 Nov 1986	El Collao, Alcoy	Rep.	Penalties: 8–9 for Cádiz CF
Atlético Baleares	2–4 (aet)	RCD Mallorca	13 Nov 1986	Balear, Palma de Mallorca	Rep.	
UP Langreo	2–0	CD Castellón	18 Nov 1986	Ganzábal, Langreo	Rep.	Match postponed due to a poisoning of CD Castellón players.
UD Las Palmas Atlético	0–1 (aet)	CD Logroñés	5 Nov 1986	Insular, Las Palmas de Gran Canaria	Rep.	
Mallorca Atlético	3–2 (aet)	San Sebastián CF	6 Nov 1986	Lluís Sitjar, Palma de Mallorca	Rep.	
Atlético Marbella	0–0 (p)	Real Betis	5 Nov 1986	Municipal, Marbella	Rep.	Penalties: 3–4 for Real Betis
Real Madrid Aficionados	3–1 (aet)	UD Las Palmas	5 Nov 1986	Ciudad Deportiva, Madrid	Rep.	
Villarreal CF	0–1	Real Sociedad	5 Nov 1986	El Madrigal, Villarreal	Rep.	
Bye: CD Eldense, SD Eibar, Athletic Bilbao, Atlético de Madrid, FC Barcelona, Real Madrid CF, Real Zaragoza.

== Bracket ==
Round of 16
1	FC Barcelona	0	1	1
16	CA Osasuna (5–3 p)	1	0	1
8	Cádiz CF	0	1	1
9	Real Madrid CF	0	6	6
5	Atlético de Madrid	1	3	4
12	Real Madrid Aficionados	0	1	1
4	Real Zaragoza	1	0	1
13	RCD Mallorca	0	2	2
6	Mallorca Atlético	3	0	3
11	CD Eldense	1	1	2
3	SD Eibar	0	0	0
14	Real Sociedad	2	2	4
7	UP Langreo	0	1	1
10	Athletic Bilbao	1	4	5
2	Real Betis	0	1	1
15	CD Logroñés	0	3	3

Quarter-finals
CA Osasuna	1	1	2
Real Madrid CF	2	4	6
Atlético de Madrid	1	3	4
RCD Mallorca	0	1	1
Mallorca Atlético	0	1	1
Real Sociedad	0	10	10
Athletic Bilbao	2	0	2
CD Logroñés	0	1	1

Semi-finals
Real Madrid CF	3	0	3
Atlético de Madrid	2	2	4
Real Sociedad	0	1	1
Athletic Bilbao	0	0	0

Final
Atlético de Madrid	2
Real Sociedad (2–4 p)	2

== Round of 16 ==
Team 1	Agg.	Team 2	1st leg	2nd leg
Barcelona	1–1 (4–5 p)	Osasuna	0–1	1–0
Cádiz	1–6	Real Madrid	0–0	1–6
Atlético Madrid	4–1	Real Madrid Aficionados	1–0	3–1
Zaragoza	1–2 (aet)	Mallorca	1–0	0–2
Mallorca Atlético	3–2	Eldense	3–1	0–1
Eibar	0–4	Real Sociedad	0–2	0–2
Langreo	1–5	Athletic Bilbao	0–1	1–4
Betis	1–3	Logroñés	0–0	1–3

=== First leg ===
28 January 1987	Eibar	0–2	Real Sociedad	Eibar
20:30 CET		Report (in Spanish)	Bakero 39'; Gajate 44'	Stadium: Ipurua; Attendance: 8,000; Referee: Ramos Marcos

28 January 1987	Langreo	0–1	Athletic Bilbao	Langreo
20:30 CET		Report (in Spanish)	Sarriugarte 80'	Stadium: Ganzábal; Attendance: 4,000; Referee: Sánchez Arminio

28 January 1987	Mallorca Atlético	3–1	Eldense	Palma de Mallorca
21:00 CET	Nadal 46'; Molina 58'; Sala 90+5'	Report (in Spanish)	Botella 27'	Stadium: Lluís Sitjar; Attendance: 400; Referee: Casas Bascuñana

28 January 1987	Atlético Madrid	1–0	Real Madrid Aficionados	Madrid
21:00 CET	Salinas 28'	Report (in Spanish)		Stadium: Vicente Calderón; Attendance: 8,000; Referee: Gómez Ramírez

28 January 1987	Betis	0–0	Logroñés	Seville
21:00 CET		Report (in Spanish)		Stadium: Benito Villamarín; Referee: Urío Velázquez

28 January 1987	Cádiz	0–0	Real Madrid CF	Cádiz
21:00 CET		Report (in Spanish)		Stadium: Ramón de Carranza; Referee: García de Loza

28 January 1987	Barcelona	0–1	Osasuna	Barcelona
21:15 CET		Report (in Spanish)	Goikoetxea 7'	Stadium: Camp Nou; Attendance: 20,000; Referee: Jiménez Muñoz

29 January 1987	Zaragoza	1–0	Mallorca	Zaragoza
16:30 CET	Juan Carlos 56'	Report (in Spanish)		Stadium: La Romareda; Attendance: 20,000; Referee: Taboada Soto

=== Second leg ===
11 February 1987	Real Madrid Aficionados	1–3	Atlético Madrid	Madrid
15:30 CET	Vallejo 24'	Report (in Spanish)	Da Silva 28'; Julio Salinas 43'; Marina 71'	Stadium: Ciudad Deportiva; Attendance: 12,000; Referee: Calvo Córdova

11 February 1987	Real Sociedad	2–0	Eibar	San Sebastián
20:15 CET	Arrien 2'; Mujika 44'	Report (in Spanish)		Stadium: Atotxa; Attendance: 8,000; Referee: Crespo Aurré

11 February 1987	Athletic Bilbao	4–1	Langreo	Bilbao
20:15 CET	Pizo Gómez 47'; Sarriugarte 49'; Salinas 52'; Sarabia 53'	Report (in Spanish)	Juan Carlos 66' (pen.)	Stadium: San Mamés; Attendance: 7,000; Referee: Pérez Sánchez

11 February 1987	Osasuna	0–1 (a.e.t.) (5–3 p)	Barcelona	Pamplona
21:15 CET		Report (in Spanish)	Lineker 79'	Stadium: El Sadar; Referee: Valdés Sánchez
	Penalties
	Robinson (penalty scored); Goikoetxea (penalty scored); Lecumberri (penalty scored); Bernardo (penalty scored); Rípodas (penalty scored)		(penalty scored) Roberto; (penalty scored) Lineker; (penalty missed) Marcos; (penalty scored) Manolo

11 February 1987	Logroñés	3–1	Betis	Logroño
20:30 CET	Noly 4', 15'; Latapia 51'	Report (in Spanish)	Calleja 17'	Stadium: Las Gaunas; Referee: Mazorra Freire

11 February 1987	Mallorca	2–0 (a.e.t.)	Zaragoza	Palma de Mallorca
21:00 CET	Luis García 56', 96'	Report (in Spanish)		Stadium: Luis Sitjar; Referee: Sánchez Molina

11 February 1987	Real Madrid	6–1	Cádiz	Madrid
21:00 CET	Butragueño 4', 89'; Hugo Sánchez 43', 45'; Pardeza 69'; Michel 81'	Report (in Spanish)	Mágico González 32' (pen.)	Stadium: Santiago Bernabéu; Attendance: 20,000; Referee: Enríquez Negreira

11 February 1987	Eldense	1–0	Mallorca Atlético	Elda
21:15 CET	Marco Antonio 78'	Report (in Spanish)		Stadium: Pepico Amat; Attendance: 7,000; Referee: Alfaro López

== Quarter-finals ==
Team 1	Agg.	Team 2	1st leg	2nd leg
Osasuna	2–6	Real Madrid	1–2	1–4
Atlético de Madrid	4–1	Mallorca	1–0	3–1
Mallorca Atlético	1–10	Real Sociedad	0–0	1–10
Athletic Bilbao	2–1	Logroñés	2–0	0–1

=== First leg ===
25 February 1987	Athletic Bilbao	2–0	Logroñés	Bilbao
20:15 CET	Sarriugarte 34'; Urtubi 69' (pen.)	Report (in Spanish)		Stadium: San Mamés; Referee: Miguel Pérez

25 February 1987	Osasuna	1–2	Real Madrid	Pamplona
20:30 CET	Rípodas 45+2'	Report (in Spanish)	Valdano 15'; Hugo Sánchez 54'	Stadium: El Sadar; Referee: Pes Pérez

25 February 1987	Mallorca Atlético	0–0	Real Sociedad	Palma de Mallorca
21:00 CET		Report (in Spanish)		Stadium: Luís Sitjar; Referee: Crespo Aurré

25 February 1987	Atlético de Madrid	1–0	Mallorca	Madrid
21:00 CET	Landáburu 90+1'	Report (in Spanish)		Stadium: Vicente Calderón; Attendance: 25,000; Referee: Andújar Oliver

=== Second leg ===
11 March 1987	Real Sociedad	10–1	Mallorca Atlético	San Sebastián
20:15 CET	Górriz 4', 32'; Bakero 10', 86'; Begiristain 33', 65'; Loren 47', 56'; Zamora 53'; Mujika 68'	Report (in Spanish)	Molina 89'	Stadium: Atocha; Referee: Marín López

11 March 1987	Logroñés	1–0	Athletic Bilbao	Logroño
20:30 CET	Noly 31'	Report (in Spanish)		Stadium: Las Gaunas; Referee: Soriano Aladrén

11 March 1987	Mallorca	1–3	Atlético de Madrid	Palma de Mallorca
21:00 CET	Orejuela 18'	Report (in Spanish)	Uralde 8', 13'; Landáburu 40'	Stadium: Luís Sitjar; Referee: Urízar Azpitarte

11 March 1987	Real Madrid	4–1	Osasuna	Madrid
21:00 CET	Hugo Sánchez 13'; Gordillo 44', 52'; Santillana 59'	Report (in Spanish)	Rípodas 40'	Stadium: Santiago Bernabéu; Attendance: 30,000; Referee: Valdés Sánchez

== Semi-finals ==
Team 1	Agg.	Team 2	1st leg	2nd leg
Real Madrid	3–4	Atlético de Madrid	3–2	0–2
Real Sociedad	1–0	Athletic Bilbao	0–0	1–0

=== First leg ===
3 June 1987	Real Sociedad	0–0	Athletic Bilbao	San Sebastián
20:15 CET		Report (in Spanish)		Stadium: Atotxa; Referee: Soriano Aladrén

3 June 1987	Real Madrid CF	3–2	Atlético de Madrid	Madrid
21:00 CET	Hugo Sánchez 10', 56'; Butragueño 54'	Report (in Spanish)	Quique Ramos 65'; Marina 85'	Stadium: Santiago Bernabéu; Attendance: 60,000; Referee: Merino González

=== Second leg ===
10 June 1987	Athletic Bilbao	0–1	Real Sociedad	Bilbao
20:15 CET		Report (in Spanish)	Bakero 25'	Stadium: San Mamés; Attendance: 42,000; Referee: Soriano Aladrén

10 June 1987	Atlético de Madrid	2–0	Real Madrid CF	Madrid
21:00 CET	Uralde 56'; Marina 69'	Report (in Spanish)		Stadium: Vicente Calderón; Referee: Merino González

== Final ==
27 June 1987
20:30 CET

Atlético de Madrid	2–2 (a.e.t.)	Real Sociedad
Da Silva 24'; Rubio 74'	Report (in Spanish)	López Ufarte 9'; Txiki Begiristain 35'
Penalties
Rubio (penalty scored); Da Silva (penalty missed); Landáburu (penalty scored); Quique Ramos (penalty missed)	2–4	(penalty scored) Bakero; (penalty scored) Mujika; (penalty scored) Martín Begiristain; (penalty scored) Larrañaga

La Romareda, Zaragoza
Attendance: 40,000
Referee: Ramos Marcos

Copa del Rey
1986–87 winners
Real Sociedad
1st title
