= Luis Dadíe =

Spanish association football player

Personal information
- Full name: Luis Fernando Dadíe Fernández
- Date of birth: 17 May 1966 (age 60)
- Place of birth: Pasaia, Spain
- Height: 1.79 m (5 ft 10 1/2 in)
- Position: Centre back

Youth career
- –1984: Real Sociedad

Senior career*
Years	Team	Apps	(Gls)
1984–1987	San Sebastián	38	(0)
1985–1991	Real Sociedad	58	(0)
1991–1994	Celta Vigo	70	(2)
1994–1996	Osasuna	19	(0)
1996–1997	Toledo	0	(0)
Total		185	(2)

International career
1986–1987	Spain U21	4	(1)
- * Club domestic league appearances and goals

Luis Fernando Dadíe Fernández (born 17 May 1966) is a Spanish retired footballer who played as a defender. He could play in any defensive position, but was most noted as a centre back.

He began his career with Real Sociedad, and amassed 91 appearances during eight seasons in La Liga with Sociedad and Celta Vigo, scoring once. He earned four caps for the Spanish national under-21 side, and scored one goal.

== Club career ==
=== Real Sociedad ===
Dadíe was born in Pasaia, in the province of Gipuzkoa, in the Basque autonomous community, and began his career with the youth teams of Real Sociedad, based in San Sebastián, the capital of Gipuzkoa. He began playing for Sociedad's B team, known as San Sebastián, during the 1984–85 Segunda División B season, and made his La Liga debut for the first team the following year. This came in the Basque derby away at Athletic Bilbao's San Mamés Stadium on 10 November 1985, which Sociedad lost 2–0. He started in the 1987 Copa del Rey Final, held at Real Zaragoza's home ground, La Romareda, on 27 June. Los Reales beat Atlético Madrid on penalties after a 2–2 draw to win their first Copa del Rey since 1909.

1987–88 was an excellent season for Real Sociedad. They reached a second consecutive Copa del Rey final, although this time Dadíe was an unused substitute as they lost 1–0 to Barcelona. Sociedad also finished as runners-up in the league, albeit some distance behind champions Real Madrid, and qualified for the 1988–89 UEFA Cup. This allowed Dadíe to make his European debut, not having played a part in the 1987–88 European Cup Winners' Cup campaign, which he did on 5 October 1988. He played the full 90 minutes of the away second leg of Sociedad's first round tie against Dukla Prague of Czechoslovakia, as they won 3–2 at Stadion Juliska to progress on away goals.

Dadíe remained at Sociedad until 1991, again playing in the UEFA Cup in his last season, but never truly established himself as a regular starter. He left after only 69 appearances in six seasons with Los Reales.

=== Celta Vigo ===
Dadíe joined Celta Vigo in the Segunda División ahead of the 1991–92 season. He made his debut in the first match of the season, a 3–0 home win over Lleida at Balaídos on 1 September, and made 37 appearances that season as Celta won the title and earned promotion to La Liga. He continued to play for Los Celestes in the top flight for another two seasons, helping them reach the third Copa del Rey final of his career in 1994. He played the entirety of the goalless 120 minutes against Real Zaragoza, and provided the best chance of the game with a cross that could not be converted by Salva. He scored Celta's third penalty in the resulting shoot-out. However, Alejo's fifth was saved by Andoni Cedrún, handing Zaragoza the trophy.

Dadíe left Celta at the end of that season, following coach Txetxu Rojo to Osasuna. He departed after 86 appearances and two goals in three seasons with Los Celestes.

=== Later career ===
Dadíe's Osasuna debut came in the Segunda División on 10 September 1994, in a 1–0 away loss to Salamanca at Helmántico Stadium. He replaced Salva, who had made the move from Celta at the same time, for the last 26 minutes of the match. Dadíe failed to truly establish himself at Osasuna, making 25 appearances in two seasons before departing for Toledo. A back injury meant that he didn't make a single appearance for Toledo, and he retired at the end of the 1996–97 season, shortly after his 31st birthday.

== International career ==
Shortly after breaking into the Real Sociedad first team, Dadíe was called up to the Spanish national under-21 team. He made his debut on 12 November 1986 in a 1988 UEFA European Under-21 Championship qualifier against Romania, with Spain earning a 1–0 home victory. He also featured in a second qualifier, a 0–0 away draw against Albania, and a 2–0 away friendly win over Portugal. His fourth and final cap came on 18 February 1987, as Spain hosted England for a friendly at Estadio El Plantío in Burgos. Dadíe scored just after the hour mark to give Spain the lead, but goals from David Rocastle and Tony Cottee saw the visitors ultimately take a 2–1 victory.

== Retirement ==
After his retirement, Dadíe worked for Radio Euskadi, commentating on Real Sociedad matches, and also held a technical role at Sociedad.

== Career statistics ==
=== Club ===
As of 18 January 2021

Club	Season	League			Cup		Europe		Total	
Club	Season	Division	Apps	Goals	Apps	Goals	Apps	Goals	Apps	Goals
San Sebastián	1984–85	Segunda División B	9	0	–		–		9	0
San Sebastián	1985–86	Segunda División B	28	0	–		–		28	0
San Sebastián	1986–87	Segunda División B	1	0	0	0	–		1	0
San Sebastián	Total		38	0	0	0	0	0	38	0
Real Sociedad	1985–86	La Liga	6	0	1	0	–		7	0
Real Sociedad	1986–87	La Liga	19	0	4	0	–		23	0
Real Sociedad	1987–88	La Liga	10	0	0	0	0	0	10	0
Real Sociedad	1988–89	La Liga	11	0	1	0	1	0	13	0
Real Sociedad	1989–90	La Liga	7	0	2	0	–		9	0
Real Sociedad	1990–91	La Liga	5	0	0	0	2	0	7	0
Real Sociedad	Total		58	0	8	0	3	0	69	0
Celta Vigo	1991–92	Segunda División	37	1	0	0	–		37	1
Celta Vigo	1992–93	La Liga	10	1	2	0	–		12	1
Celta Vigo	1993–94	La Liga	23	0	13	0	–		36	0
Celta Vigo	Total		70	2	15	0	0	0	85	2
Osasuna	1994–95	Segunda División	11	0	3	0	–		14	0
Osasuna	1995–96	Segunda División	8	0	3	0	–		11	0
Osasuna	Total		19	0	6	0	0	0	25	0
Toledo	1996–97	Segunda División	0	0	0	0	–		0	0
Career total			185	2	29	0	3	0	217	2

1. Appearance in the 1988–89 UEFA Cup
2. Appearances in the 1990–91 UEFA Cup

=== International ===
Appearances and goals by national team and year
National team	Year	Apps	Goals
Spain	1986	2	0
Spain	1987	2	1
Total		4	1

==== Under-21 international goals ====
No.	Date	Venue	Cap	Opponent	Score	Result	Competition
1	18 February 1987	Estadio El Plantío, Burgos	4	England	1–0	1–2	Friendly

== Honours ==
Real Sociedad

- Copa del Rey: 1986–87
- La Liga runners-up: 1987–88
- Copa del Rey runners-up: 1987–88

Celta Vigo

- Segunda División: 1991–92
- Copa del Rey runners-up: 1993–94
