= Ricardo Arrien =

Spanish footballer

Personal information
- Full name: Ricardo Arrien Iriondo
- Date of birth: 15 November 1960 (age 65)
- Place of birth: Guernica, Spain
- Height: 1.85 m (6 ft 1 in)
- Position: Forward

Senior career*
Years	Team	Apps	(Gls)
1979–1983	Bilbao Athletic	144	(46)
1983–1986	Athletic Bilbao	2	(0)
1984	→ Salamanca (loan)	14	(4)
1985–1986	→ Racing Santander (loan)	20	(2)
1986–1987	Real Sociedad	13	(1)
1987–1989	Sestao River	44	(16)
1989–1991	Eibar	29	(7)
Total		266	(76)
- * Club domestic league appearances and goals

Ricardo Arrien Iriondo (born 15 November 1960) is a Spanish former footballer who played as a forward.

He played 49 games and scored 7 goals in La Liga for Athletic Bilbao, Salamanca, Racing Santander and Real Sociedad, winning the Copa del Rey for the last of those clubs in 1987. In the Segunda División, he played 88 games and scored 28 goals for Bilbao Athletic, Sestao River and Eibar.

== Career ==
Born in Guernica in the Basque Country, Arrien was a youth player at Athletic Bilbao. He was brought into the first team for the first time for their Copa de la Liga second-round second leg game at home to Atlético Madrid, and played the last 26 minutes of the 2–0 win as a substitute for Miguel Sola.

Having played the first half of the season for Athletic's reserve team in the Segunda División, Arrien was loaned to a Salamanca side battling relegation from La Liga in January 1984. He scored on his top-flight debut on 8 January, in a 3–1 home win over an Osasuna side in the same condition. Returned to San Mamés, he made the only European appearance of his career on 3 October as a substitute in a goalless draw with Bordeaux, that saw Athletic leave from the last 32 of the European Cup.

In July 1985, Arrien extended his contract at Athletic until 1987, and then moved on loan to Racing Santander. A year later, he found a mutual agreement with Athletic manager José Ángel Iribar and was released, moving to regional rivals Real Sociedad for free. He did not play in the team's victory in the 1987 Copa del Rey final, but scored in earlier rounds against fellow Basque teams Basconia and Eibar. His only league goal for La Real came on 4 October 1986, heading Roberto López Ufarte's cross in the first minute of a 3–3 draw at Español.

Arrien concluded his career in 1991, after two seasons apiece with second-tier clubs from his home region, namely Sestao River and Eibar.
