= Javier Oliete =

Spanish footballer

Personal information
- Full name: Francisco Javier Oliete Valle
- Date of birth: 9 September 1970 (age 56)
- Place of birth: Zaragoza, Spain
- Height: 1.82 m (5 ft 11 1/2 in)
- Position: Left back

Youth career
- Barcelona

Senior career*
Years	Team	Apps	(Gls)
1990–1991	Barcelona B	23	(0)
1991–1992	Barcelona	0	(0)
1991–1992	→ Albacete (loan)	25	(1)
1992–1996	Albacete	22	(0)
1993–1994	→ Celta (loan)	17	(0)
1996	Villarreal	0	(0)
1996–1997	Sporting Gijón	20	(1)
1997–1998	Lleida	21	(1)
2001	Villarrobledo	16	(0)
2001–2002	Pinoso		
2002–2003	Atlético Tarazona	28	(0)
2003–2007	Teruel	29	(1)
Total		201	(4)

International career
1987	Spain U16	5	(0)
1987–1988	Spain U18	4	(0)
1991–1992	Spain U23	5	(0)
- * Club domestic league appearances and goals

Francisco Javier Oliete Valle (born 9 September 1970) is a Spanish former footballer who played as a left back.
