= Joseba Agirre (footballer, born 1964) =

Spanish footballer and manager

Personal information
- Full name: Joseba Agirre López
- Date of birth: 17 March 1964 (age 62)
- Place of birth: Ortuella, Spain
- Height: 1.76 m (5 ft 9 in)
- Position: Midfielder

Senior career*
Years	Team	Apps	(Gls)
1981–1983	Sestao SC		
1983–1987	Bilbao Athletic	115	(17)
1984–1990	Athletic Bilbao	58	(6)
1989–1990	Bilbao Athletic	14	(0)
1990–1994	Real Burgos	125	(15)
1994	Celta	11	(1)
1994–1996	Alavés	54	(5)

International career
1993	Basque Country	1	(0)

Managerial career
- 2015–2019: Athletic Bilbao (women)
- * Club domestic league appearances and goals

Joseba Agirre López (born 17 March 1964) is a Spanish retired footballer who played as a midfielder, and a current manager. He mainly managed Athletic Bilbao women's team.
