= Fran (footballer, born August 1972) =

Spanish footballer

Personal information
- Full name: Francisco José Nogueira Maneiro
- Date of birth: 4 August 1972 (age 54)
- Place of birth: Ferrol, Spain
- Height: 1.80 m (5 ft 11 in)
- Position: Forward

Senior career*
Years	Team	Apps	(Gls)
1990–1992	Racing de Ferrol		
1992–1994	Celta Vigo B	51	(6)
1994–1997	Racing de Ferrol	53	(17)
1997–2000	Leça	85	(30)
2000–2002	Racing de Ferrol	62	(17)
2002–2003	Ciudad de Murcia	35	(18)
2003	Mirandés	17	(2)
2004	Logroñés	14	(3)
2004	Cartagena	15	(1)
2005	Ourense	12	(3)
2005–2006	Cerceda	30	(12)
- * Club domestic league appearances and goals

Francisco José Nogueira Maneiro, known as Fran (born 4 August 1972) is a Spanish retired footballer who played as a forward. Among others, he played in the Primeira Liga with Leça F.C. and the Segunda División with Racing de Ferrol.
