= Lluís Sitjar Stadium =

Demolished stadium in Palma de Mallorca, Spain

Lluís Sitjar
- Interactive map of Lluís Sitjar
- Full name: Estadio Lluís Sitjar
- Former names: Es Fortí (1945 – 1960)
- Location: Palma de Mallorca, Spain
- Coordinates: 39.5808°N 2.6407°E
- Owner: RCD Mallorca; Asociación de Copropietarios del Lluís Sitjar
- Capacity: 18,000
- Surface: Grass
- Field size: 103 m × 69 m (338 ft × 226 ft)

Construction
- Opened: 1945
- Closed: partly in 1999, and fully closed in 2007
- Demolished: 2014
- Architect: Carlos Garau

Tenants
- RCD Mallorca (1945—1999); RCD Mallorca B (1983—2007)

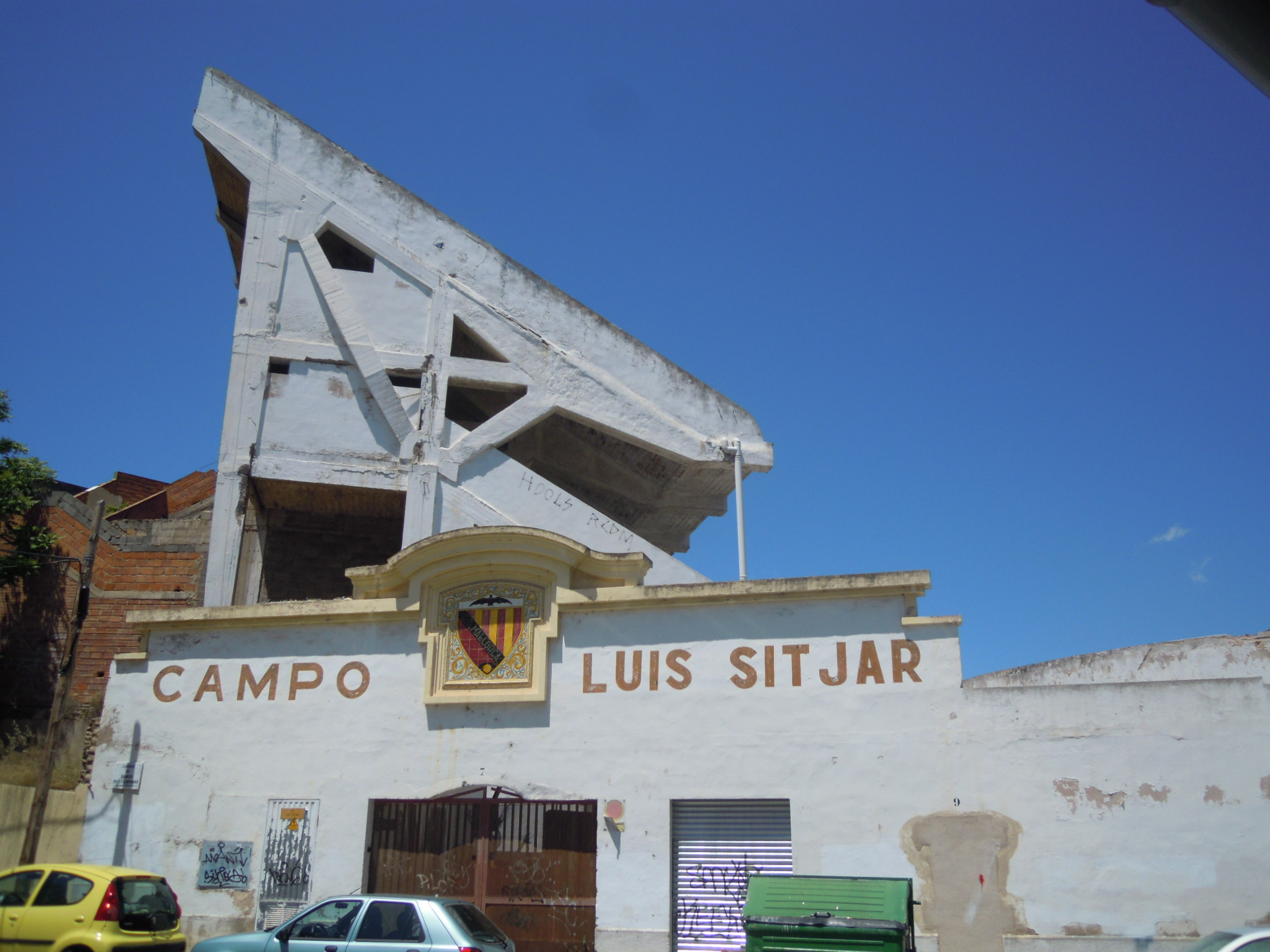
Lluís Sitjar Stadium

Estadi Lluís Sitjar was a multi-use stadium in Palma de Mallorca, Spain. It was used mostly for football matches and hosted the home matches of RCD Mallorca. The stadium was able to hold 18,000 people and opened in 1945. RCD Mallorca left the stadium in 1999 when ONO Estadi (Son Moix) opened, but the reserve team RCD Mallorca B continued to use the stadium until 2007, before they moved to Son Bibiloni, the club's training complex to the north of Palma.

Its name is due to Lluís Sitjar, former president of RCD Mallorca on several occasions. It was renamed after him on 1960.

Demolition work of the stadium began in November 2014 and was completed in April 2015.
