= José Miguel Zúñiga =

Spanish footballer (born 1962)

Personal information
- Full name: José Miguel Zúñiga Martiarena
- Date of birth: 21 August 1962 (age 64)
- Place of birth: San Sebastián, Spain
- Height: 1.81 m (5 ft 11 in)
- Position: Defender

Youth career
- Real Sociedad

Senior career*
Years	Team	Apps	(Gls)
1981–1987	Real Sociedad B	90	(4)
1985–1989	Real Sociedad	40	(2)
1989–1992	Real Oviedo	62	(1)
1992–1993	Castellón	20	(0)
1993–1994	Racing Ferrol	28	(2)
Total		240	(9)
- * Club domestic league appearances and goals

José Miguel Zúñiga Martiarena (born 21 August 1962), also known by the first name Kiko, is a Spanish former footballer who played as a defender. He played 102 La Liga games and scored 3 goals for Real Sociedad and Real Oviedo.

== Career ==
Born in San Sebastián in the Basque Country, Zúñiga played in the youth ranks of his hometown club Real Sociedad, and made his senior debut in the third-tier Segunda División B with their reserve team, San Sebastián CF. His first involvement with the first team was on 28 December 1982 in the second leg of the Supercopa de España; he remained an unused substitute as his team took Real Madrid to extra time and won 4–0.

Zúñiga made his debut in La Liga on 26 October 1985, aged 23, as his team were limited by injuries and suspensions. He headed an own goal in a 3–1 loss away to Atlético Madrid. He became a regular starter in 1987–88, scoring his first goal on 26 March to conclude a 4–0 home win over Logroñés; four days later in the Copa del Rey final, he played as his team lost their title by a single goal to Barcelona.

In June 1989, Zúñiga ended his 13-year stay at Real Sociedad by having his contract cancelled and moving to fellow top-flight team Real Oviedo on a three-year deal. He alleged that goalkeeper Luis Arconada had made his life so difficult that he had to leave his native city. He scored his only goal for the Asturian club on 3 December, opening a 2–1 win away to Sevilla; the team came 6th in 1990–91 and qualified for the UEFA Cup, where they fell in the first round to Genoa.

== Personal life ==
On 5 November 2011, Zúñiga's home in Castejón in Navarre burned down. He suffered burns to his face and hands and drove through the rainy night on his scooter to Madrid, and did not report the incident for 20 days until the Policía Foral insisted that he did so.

Zúñiga was charged with arson and insurance fraud, with the prosecution requesting a 15-year prison sentence. He maintained that he had been routinely threatened by gitano neighbours who burned his house in revenge against his earlier police reports. He said that he had not reported the fire as he had no confidence in the police, because of their handling of the previous incidents. He was acquitted of all charges in June 2017.

In November 2017, after having been divorced twice, 55-year-old Zúñiga appeared on Cuatro reality television programme First Dates.
