= Miguel Ángel Fuentes =

Spanish footballer (born 1964)

Personal information
- Full name: Miguel Ángel Fuentes Azpiroz
- Date of birth: 6 August 1964 (age 62)
- Place of birth: San Sebastián, Spain
- Height: 1.81 m (5 ft 11 in)
- Position: Right-back

Youth career
- La Salle
- 1979–1980: Real Sociedad
- 1980–1981: La Salle
- 1981–1983: Real Sociedad
- 1981–1982: → La Salle (loan)

Senior career*
Years	Team	Apps	(Gls)
1983–1987	Eibar	41+	(9+)
1987–2001	Real Sociedad	439	(7)
Total		480+	(16+)
- * Club domestic league appearances and goals

Miguel Ángel Fuentes Azpiroz (born 6 August 1964) is a Spanish former professional footballer who played mainly as a right-back.

He all but spent his entire career with Real Sociedad, appearing in 495 competitive matches, among the highest totals in its history. He later served as the club's president.

== Playing career ==
=== Club ===
Born in San Sebastián, Gipuzkoa, Basque Country, Fuentes joined Real Sociedad's youth setup in 1979 from La Salle CD. Released the following year, he returned to Sanse in 1981, finishing his development in 1983 but being deemed surplus to requirements again shortly after.

Fuentes subsequently signed for Tercera División club SD Eibar, achieving promotion to Segunda División B in 1986 and being ever-present in the following season as his team nearly achieved another promotion. During that period, he played as a forward or winger.

Fuentes returned to Real Sociedad in the summer of 1987, now being assigned to the main squad in La Liga. He made his professional debut on 30 August by coming on as a substitute in a 1–0 away loss against Real Zaragoza, and made 24 league appearances during the campaign as the side finished runners-up behind Real Madrid, also coming off the bench in the final of the Copa del Rey which ended with a narrow defeat to FC Barcelona. In what was a transitional period for the club as their successful squad of the decade began to break up, they reached the quarter-finals of the 1988–89 UEFA Cup but lost out to VfB Stuttgart in a penalty shootout with the player, again introduced as a substitute, missing a good chance to win the tie; it was around that time that he was converted into a right-back by manager John Toshack.

Fuentes established himself as a starter for the Txuri-urdin from 1989–90 onwards. He played his last match on 17 June 2001 at the age of 36, replacing Tayfun Korkut in a 0–1 home defeat against CA Osasuna.

=== International ===
Fuentes won one cap for the unofficial Basque Country regional team, in a 1–1 friendly draw with Paraguay on 22 December 1995 held at the San Mamés Stadium.

== Post-retirement ==
Fuentes majored in management. From July 2005 to June 2007 he acted as president to Real Sociedad, quitting his post for personal reasons with the team on the verge of relegation, an eventuality which was confirmed a few weeks later. He was replaced in the interim by María de la Peña, the first woman to hold such a position at the club, albeit she stepped aside a matter of months afterwards to be succeeded by Iñaki Badiola.

== Personal life ==
Fuentes' younger brother, Juan Luis (one year his junior), was also a footballer. A midfielder, he played professionally for Sestao Sport Club and was employed in several roles by Athletic Bilbao including as head coach of their women's team.

Fuentes' nephews, Luca and Marco Sangalli, also represented Real Sociedad professionally.

== Honours ==
Eibar

- Tercera División: (Note: Won regional Group III and promoted in the playoffs.) 1985–86

== See also ==
- List of La Liga players (400+ appearances)
