= Mambrillas de Lara =

Coordinates: 42°06′N 3°28′W

- Municipality
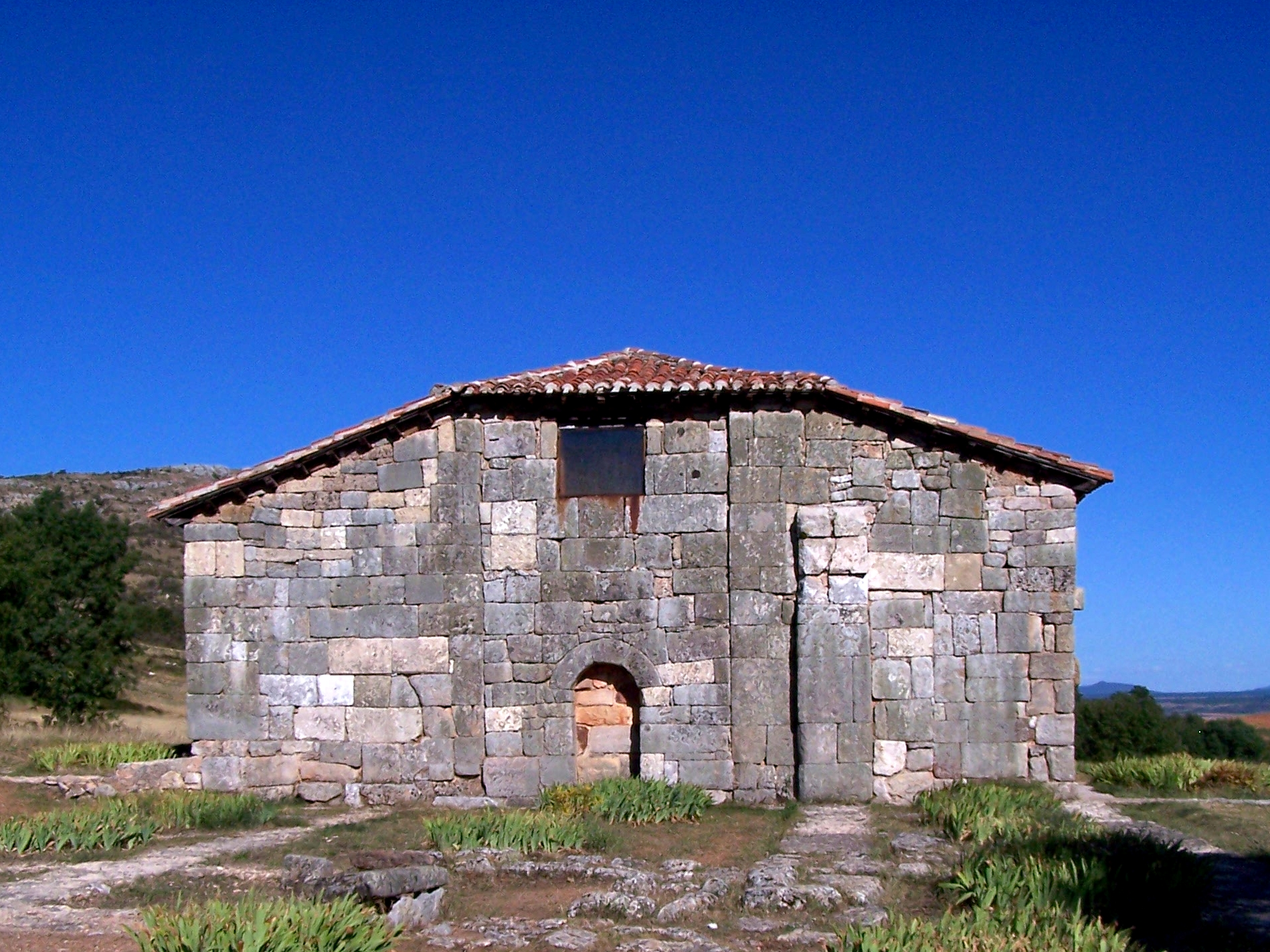
- Ermita de Santa Maria de Lara
- Interactive map of Mambrillas de Lara
- Country: Spain
- Autonomous community: Castile and León
- Province: Burgos
- Comarca: Sierra de la Demanda

Area
  - Total: 34 km^{2} (13 sq mi)
- Elevation: 1,006 m (3,301 ft)

Population (2025-01-01)
  - Total: 54
  - Density: 1.6/km^{2} (4.1/sq mi)
- Time zone: UTC+1 (CET)
  - Summer (DST): UTC+2 (CEST)
- Postal code: 09640
- Website: http://www.mambrillasdelara.es/

Mambrillas de Lara (Spanish pronunciation: [mambɾˈiʎas dˈe lˈaɾa]) is a village and municipality located in the province of Burgos, in the autonomous community of Castile and León, Spain. It belongs to the comarca of Sierra de la Demanda and the judicial district of Salas de los Infantes. According to the 2025 census (INE), it has a population of 54 inhabitants. It covers an area of 34.03 square kilometres (13.14 sq mi).

The Hermitage of Santa María de Lara, one of the few surviving Visigothic churches on the Iberian Peninsula, is located within the municipality, near the village of Quintanilla de las Viñas.

== Localities of the munipality ==
- Cubillejo de Lara
- Mambrillas de Lara (seat or capital)
- Quintanilla de las Viñas

== Notable people ==
- Lorenzo Juarros García, "Loren" (1966) - Retired professional footballer
