= Pedro Alberto =

Spanish footballer (1969–2002)

Personal information
- Full name: Pedro Alberto Cano Arenas
- Date of birth: 18 June 1969
- Place of birth: Bilbao, Spain
- Date of death: 20 July 2002 (aged 33)
- Place of death: Novelda, Spain
- Height: 1.81 m (5 ft 11 1/2 in)
- Position: Centre-back

Youth career
- Santurtzi

Senior career*
| Years | Team | Apps | (Gls) |
| 1988–1991 | Palencia | 35 | (4) |
| 1991–1993 | Oviedo B | 65 | (10) |
| 1992–1996 | Oviedo | 56 | (2) |
| 1996–1998 | Alavés | 35 | (3) |
| 1998–2002 | Toledo | 121 | (10) |
| 2002 | Novelda | 0 | (0) |
| Total | | 312 | (29) |
- * Club domestic league appearances and goals

Pedro Alberto Cano Arenas (18 June 1969 – 20 July 2002), known as Pedro Alberto, was a Spanish footballer who played as a central defender.

== Club career ==
Born in Bilbao, Biscay, Pedro Alberto joined Real Oviedo in 1991 from lowly CF Palencia. He made his La Liga debut on 29 February of the following year by starting in a 0–2 home loss against FC Barcelona, but was only a backup or reserve team player for the vast majority of his spell in Asturias, his best output consisting of 33 matches and one goal in the 1995–96 season to help the club to finish 14th in the top flight, thus avoiding relegation.

After leaving in summer 1996, Pedro Alberto played a further four years at the professional level, representing Deportivo Alavés and CD Toledo in the Segunda División. He also competed with the latter in the Segunda División B.

== Death ==
On 20 July 2002, just three days into preseason with his new team, third-tier Novelda CF, Pedro Alberto had just finished a short sprint and was preparing to stretch, when he fell to the ground and lost consciousness. His death was attributed to a cerebral hemorrhage, and the 33-year-old left behind a seven-month pregnant wife.

== Honours ==
Palencia

- Tercera División: 1989–90

Alavés

- Segunda División: 1997–98
