= Coreses =

Coordinates: 41°33′N 5°37′W

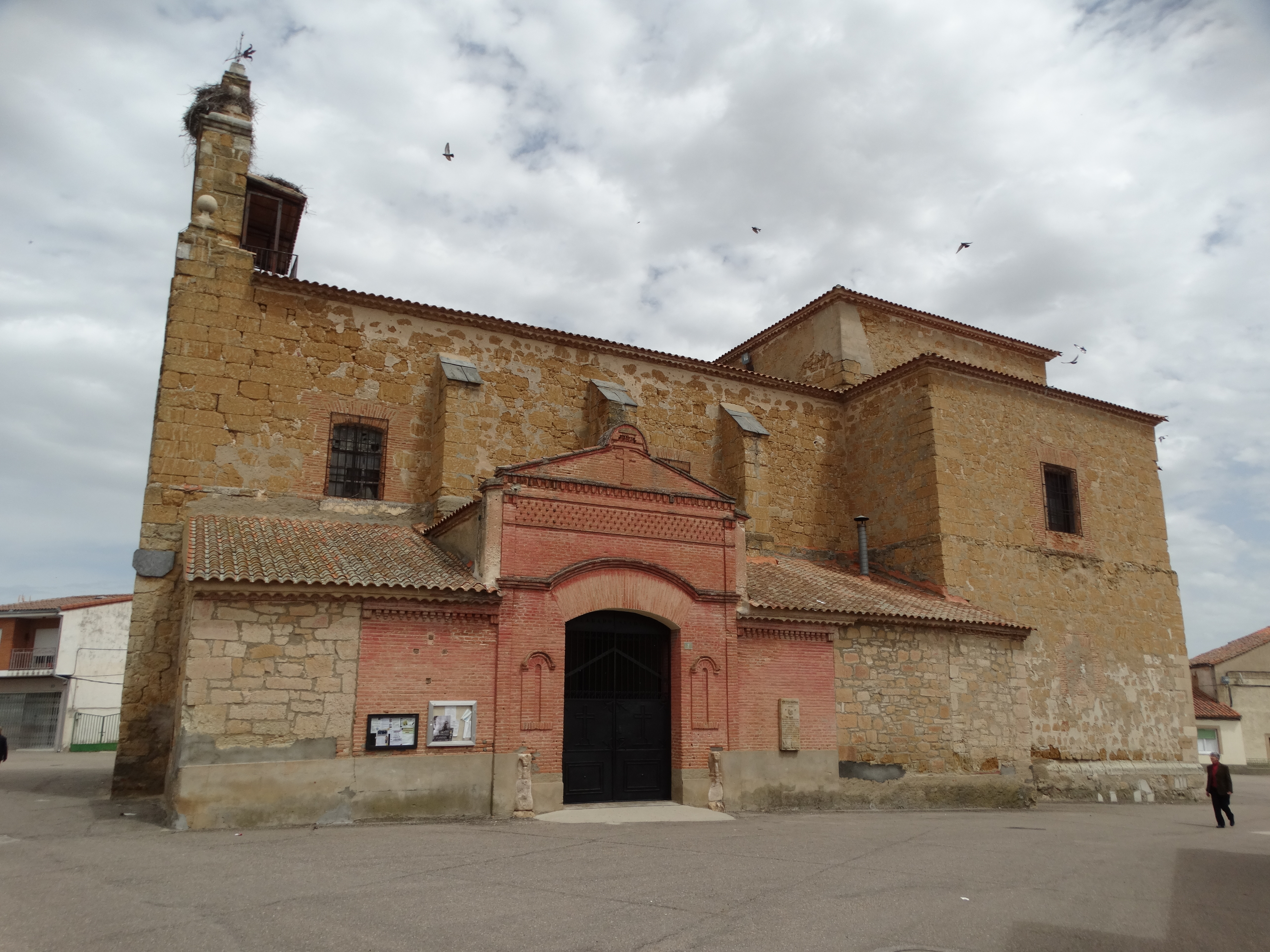

- Flag Coat of arms
- Interactive map of Coreses
- Country: Spain
- Autonomous community: Castile and León
- Province: Zamora
- Municipality: Coreses

Area
  - Total: 43 km^{2} (17 sq mi)

Population (2025-01-01)
  - Total: 1,054
  - Density: 25/km^{2} (63/sq mi)
- Time zone: UTC+1 (CET)
  - Summer (DST): UTC+2 (CEST)
- Climate: BSk
- Website: Official website

Coreses is a municipality located in the province of Zamora, Castile and León, Spain. According to the 2025 census (INE), the municipality has a population of 1,054 inhabitants. Includes the population centers of Coreses, La Estación, and San Pelayo.

== Demography ==
According to the 2009 census (INE), the municipality has a population of 1,156 inhabitants.

According to the 2025 census (INE), the municipality has a population of 1,054 inhabitants.
