= Manel (footballer, born 1972) =

Spanish footballer

Personal information
- Full name: Manuel Fernández Anidos
- Date of birth: 9 May 1972 (age 54)
- Place of birth: Narón, Spain
- Height: 1.78 m (5 ft 10 in)
- Position: Midfielder

Youth career
- Racing Ferrol

Senior career*
Years	Team	Apps	(Gls)
1990–1991	Racing Ferrol	18	(5)
1991–1994	Celta B	96	(23)
1993	Celta	1	(0)
1994–1996	Racing Ferrol	59	(14)
1996–1998	Elche	33	(1)
1998–2003	Racing Ferrol	146	(25)
2003–2004	Cerceda	36	(8)
2004–2006	Viveiro	67	(9)
2006–2011	Narón	64	(8)
Total		520	(93)

International career
1993	Spain U21	4	(0)
- * Club domestic league appearances and goals

Manuel Fernández Anidos (born 9 May 1972 in Narón, Province of A Coruña, Galicia), commonly known as Manel, is a Spanish former professional footballer who played as a midfielder.
