= Juan María Mujika =

Spanish footballer (1963–2004)

Personal information
- Full name: Juan María Mujika Izaguirre
- Date of birth: 12 May 1963
- Place of birth: San Sebastián, Spain
- Date of death: 14 June 2004 (aged 41)
- Place of death: Zumarraga, Spain
- Height: 1.78 m (5 ft 10 in)
- Position: Midfielder

Senior career*
Years	Team	Apps	(Gls)
1984–1985	Real Sociedad B	31	(4)
1985–1990	Real Sociedad	128	(11)
1990–1993	Deportivo La Coruña	37	(2)
1993–1995	Alavés	66	(20)
1995–1996	San Pedro	33	(1)
- Urola
Total		295+	(38+)

International career
1985	Spain U21	1	(0)

Managerial career
- Urola
- * Club domestic league appearances and goals

Juan María Mujika Izaguirre (12 May 1963 – 14 June 2004), also known by the first name Musti, was a Spanish footballer who played as a midfielder.

He played 146 games and scored 12 goals in La Liga for Real Sociedad and Deportivo de La Coruña, and won the Copa del Rey in 1987 with the former.

Mujika died aged 41, having been in a coma for three years due to a car accident.

== Career ==
=== Real Sociedad ===
Born in San Sebastián in the Basque Country, Mujika came through the youth ranks of his hometown club Real Sociedad. He made his debut under manager John Toshack on 15 September 1985 in the first round of the Copa del Rey, a 3–0 win at nearby Amorebieta. Thirteen days later he played his first game in La Liga, coming on as a substitute for the injured Jesús María Satrústegui 30 minutes into a 3–1 loss at Valencia.

Mujika scored four goals in his first top-flight season and two more in the Copa de la Liga, starting on 15 December 1985 by opening a 2–1 home win over Real Valladolid when Roberto López Ufarte teed him off from a free kick; he concluded the season with a late goal in a 5–3 win over newly crowned champions Real Madrid at Atotxa Stadium. On 29 January 1986 he earned his only cap for Spain at under-21 level, in a 3–0 friendly win over Morocco at La Rosaleda Stadium.

Mujika played in La Real's run to the final of the Copa del Rey in 1986–87, scoring in a 2–0 win over fellow Basques Eibar in the last 16 and again in a 10–1 win over Mallorca B in the second leg of the quarter-finals, after the first leg had finished goalless against the reserve team. In the final on 27 June, he came on for Jesús María Zamora late in regulation time, as the game ended 2–2 after extra time and his team won the penalty shootout; he put his attempt past Atlético Madrid goalkeeper Abel Resino.

=== Later career ===
In 1990, Mujika transferred to Deportivo de La Coruña, winning promotion from the Segunda División in his first season. He returned to his native region by joining Alavés of the Segunda División B in 1993, being defeated in the playoffs in his first season and winning it in the second.

Mujika played one season in the Tercera División for Sociedad Deportiva Urola and was their manager in the regional divisions at the time of his accident.

== Death ==
In June 2001, Mujika was involved in a road accident in Eskoriatza and was taken to an intensive care unit with multiple trauma. He entered a permanent vegetative state.

Real Sociedad and Real Madrid held a benefit match for his family in November 2003. He died on 14 June 2004 in Zumarraga, aged 41.

Musti Taldea, a Real Sociedad fan club formed in 2003, is dedicated to Mujika. He is sometimes erroneously cited as the source of the name of another fan group Peña Mujika, which is instead named after a factory that backed on to the stand where said fans congregated.
