= Loren (footballer, born 1966) =

Spanish footballer

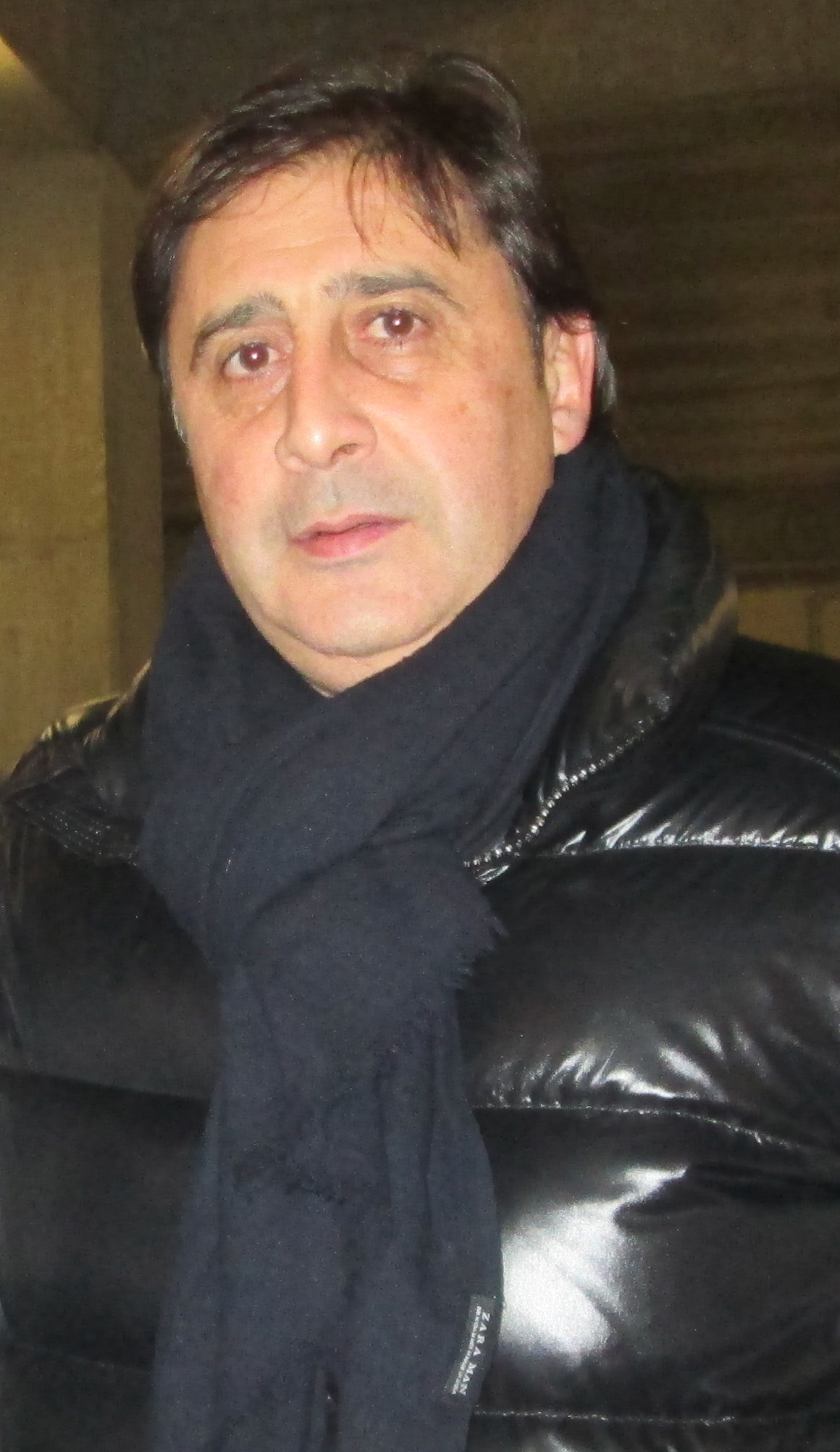
- Loren in 2014

Personal information
- Full name: Lorenzo Juarros García
- Date of birth: 7 October 1966 (age 60)
- Place of birth: Mambrillas de Lara, Spain
- Height: 1.81 m (5 ft 11 in)
- Positions: Centre-back; striker

Youth career
- Tolosa
- Real Sociedad

Senior career*
Years	Team	Apps	(Gls)
1984–1986	San Sebastián	32	(13)
1984–1989	Real Sociedad	98	(24)
1989–1991	Athletic Bilbao	62	(9)
1991–1993	Real Burgos	65	(11)
1993–2002	Real Sociedad	256	(9)
Total		513	(66)

International career
1986–1990	Spain U21	9	(6)
1987–1988	Spain U23	2	(0)
- * Club domestic league appearances and goals

Lorenzo Juarros García (born 7 October 1966), known as Loren, is a Spanish former professional footballer who played as either a central defender or striker.

In a senior career spanning nearly two decades, he represented mainly Real Sociedad, totalling 411 competitive games and scoring 41 goals in 14 seasons. He won the 1986–87 Copa del Rey with the club.

Loren also played for Athletic Bilbao, being the most expensive Spanish player at the time of his transfer.

== Club career ==
=== Real Sociedad ===
Born in Mambrillas de Lara, Province of Burgos, Loren joined Real Sociedad from amateurs Tolosa also in the Basque Country. On 9 September 1984, one month shy of his 18th birthday, he made his first-team – and La Liga – debut, in a 1–0 home loss against Málaga, as a central defender, the position in which he started his career; this was due to a strike by the professional footballers in the country, with most sides having to resort to fielding youth players.

After only four league games over his first two seasons, Loren became an undisputed starter for the side from Gipuzkoa, helping them to the 1987 Copa del Rey – he did not play in the final against Atlético Madrid due to injury, however. In the 1987–88 campaign, by now reinvented as a striker by Welsh manager John Toshack, he scored a career-best 11 goals in 36 games as the club finished second to Real Madrid.

=== Athletic and Burgos ===
In the summer of 1989, Loren signed for Real Sociedad's local rivals Athletic Bilbao, who paid 300 million pesetas for his services, a record for a national player. He later confessed that, had Athletic not paid the full extent of his clause, he would not have made the move, which would be the first of several controversial transfer negotiations between the two clubs.

Loren made his official debut for the Lions on 2 September 1989, playing the full 90 minutes in a 1–0 home victory over his former team and winning a penalty. He underperformed overall during his stint, only netting three times in his second year.

Loren then joined Real Burgos in his native region, who rose from the ashes of Burgos CF. He scored seven goals in his first season to help to a best ever ninth-place finish in the top flight, being relegated the following campaign.

=== Return to Real Sociedad ===
In the 1993 off-season, 26-year-old Loren returned to Real Sociedad. On 13 August he scored the first goal in the new Anoeta Stadium, in a friendly with Real Madrid. Again under Toshack, he returned to the stopper position, often partnering another youth graduate, José Antonio Pikabea, in his second spell, and never appearing in less than 27 league games in the following seven seasons.

After only eight games in 2001–02, Loren retired from playing football at almost 36, having played 481 top-division matches over the course of 18 seasons (53 goals). He remained with Real Sociedad as the club's director of football, a position he took up in 2009 until March 2018.

== Honours ==
Real Sociedad

- Copa del Rey: 1986–87

== See also ==
- List of La Liga players (400+ appearances)
- List of Real Sociedad players
