= List of Real Madrid CF players =

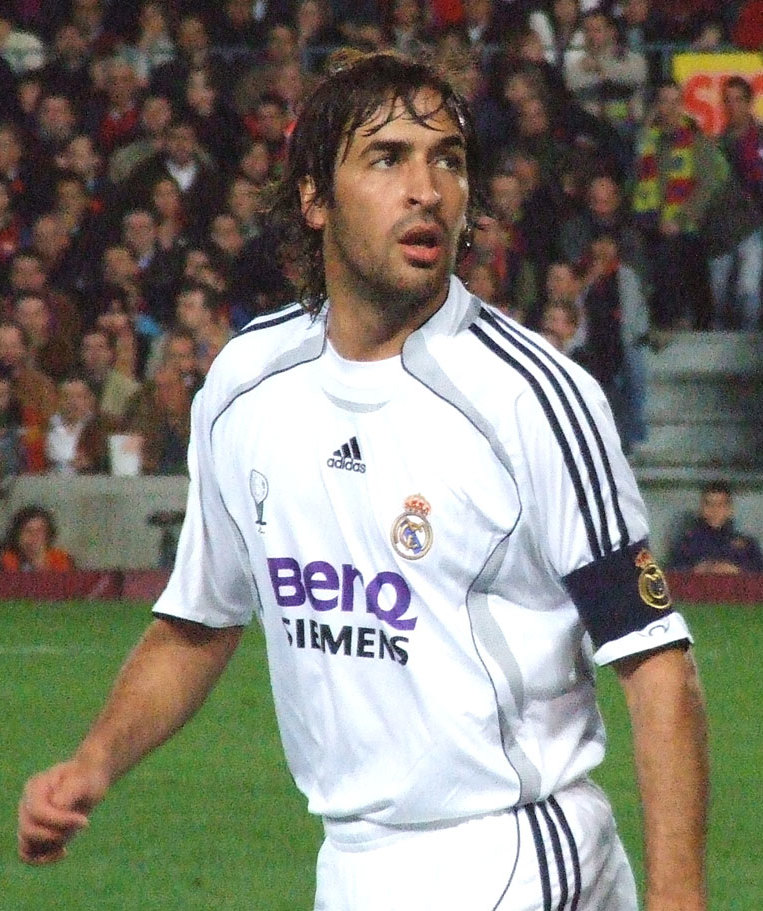
Raúl is Real Madrid's all-time appearance record holder.

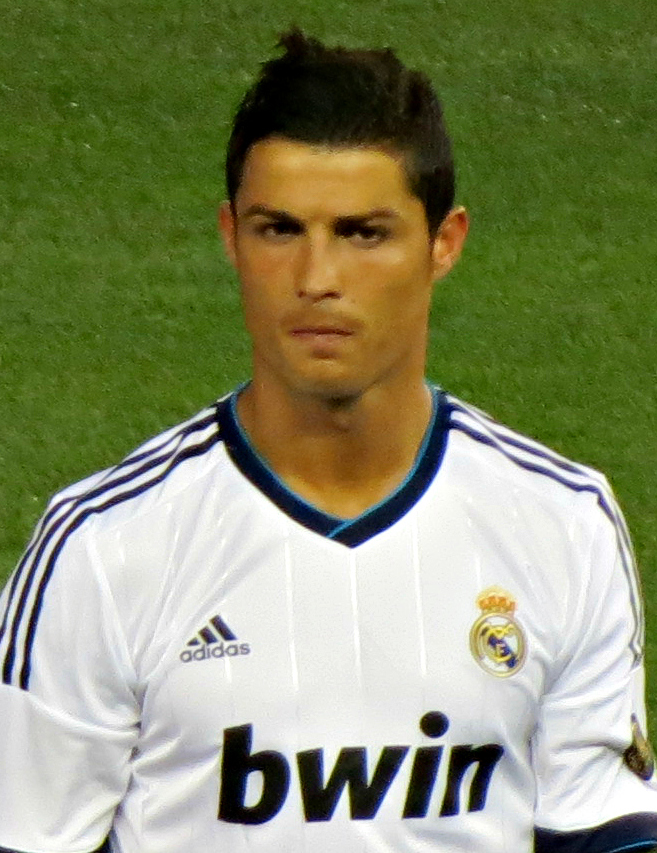
Cristiano Ronaldo is Real Madrid's all-time record goalscorer.

Real Madrid Club de Fútbol is a professional association football club based in Madrid, Spain, that plays in La Liga. The club was formed in 1902 as Madrid Football Club and played its first competitive match on 13 May 1902 when it entered the final of the Campeonato de Copa de S.M. Alfonso XIII. Real Madrid was one of the founding members of La Liga in 1929, and is one of three clubs, along with FC Barcelona and Athletic Bilbao, to have never been relegated from the league. Since then, the club's first team has competed in numerous nationally and internationally organized competitions. Real is the most successful club in Spanish football, having won 71 domestic titles; a record 36 La Liga titles, 20 Spanish Cups, 13 Spanish Super Cups, 1 Copa Eva Duarte, and 1 League Cup. Real is the most successful club in European and international football, having won 35 official UEFA and FIFA trophies in total.

Raúl holds the record for most overall appearances, having played 741 from 1994 to 2010, ahead of Iker Casillas, who made 725 appearances from 1999 to 2015. Manuel Sanchís, Jr is third with 710 appearances from 1983 to 2001 for the club. Cristiano Ronaldo is the all-time top scorer with 450 goals in 438 appearances from 2009 to 2018. He holds the record for the most goals in a season for Real Madrid, Ronaldo scored 61 in all competitions during the 2014–15 season and also holds the record for second most league goals scored in a season in La Liga, with 48 goals in 2014–15 La Liga. Karim Benzema is the second-highest scorer with 354 goals, having overtaken Raúl, who is third with 323 goals, in August 2022.

Real Madrid has employed numerous famous players, with four FIFA World Player of the Year, twelve Ballon d'Or/FIFA Ballon d'Or, four European Golden Shoe and three FIFA Club World Cup Golden Ball winners among the previous and current club players.

As of 22 August 2026, a total of 806 players have played at least one official match for Real Madrid throughout history. Raúl is the player with the most appearances, with 741 matches, while more than 100 players have played only one match. In terms of minutes played, Iker Casillas has the most with 64,920 minutes, while the player with the fewest minutes is Pedro Mosquera, who played just one minute. Alongside Spain, players from 46 different nationalities have played for Real Madrid. Argentinians are the most represented with 34 players throughout history, followed by Brazilians with 28 players, and then the French with 22 players.

== Key ==
=== General ===
- Appearances, goals and assists are for first-team official games, including those in La Liga, Copa del Rey, Copa de la Liga, Copa de la Coronación, Copa de la Gran Peña, Supercopa de España, Copa Eva Duarte, UEFA Champions League, UEFA Europa League, UEFA Cup Winners' Cup, Latin Cup, UEFA Super Cup, FIFA Club World Cup, Intercontinental Cup, FIFA Intercontinental Cup and Copa Iberoamericana.
- The following list does not include pre-season friendly / invitational tournaments, nor does it include regional tournaments such as Campeonato Regional Centro and Copa Federación Centro. This list also does not include the La Liga Minimalista competition which was held between 1927 and 1928.
- Substitute appearances are included.
- A player must have participated in at least one official match to be included in the list. The list does not include players who transferred to Real Madrid without playing any matches, those who were called up but did not appear on the field, or those who played in friendly matches without participating in official ones.
- The years refer to the sport season in which the players played their first and last matches with the team, not the calendar years.
- Players are listed according to the total number of games played. If two or more players are tied, their rankings are determined as follows:
1. Seniority, the date of the player's first match with the team.
2. goals scored

=== Table headers ===
- Player – Nationality, first name and last name or nickname.
- Position – Role on the field of play.
- Real Madrid career – Playing career at the club.
- Captaincy – Captaincy period at the club.
- Matches – Number of games played.
- Goals – Number of goals scored.
- Assists – Number of assists provided, the following numbers is based on the assists criteria according to Opta, where assists are not counted for balls that are deflected or rebounded off opposing players and have clearly affected the trajectory of the ball and its arrival to the recipient (the goal scorer). Assists are also not counted for penalty kicks, direct goals from corners or free kicks, or own goals.
- Notes – Notes of the player's information.

=== Positions and colors ===
GK	Goalkeeper	DF	Defender	MF	Midfielder	FW	Forward

^{©}	Club captains who have won a major senior competition
	Real Madrid Castilla graduate
¤	Played their full career at Real Madrid

== List of players ==
Information correct as of the match played on 21 November 2026. Bold denotes an active player for the club.

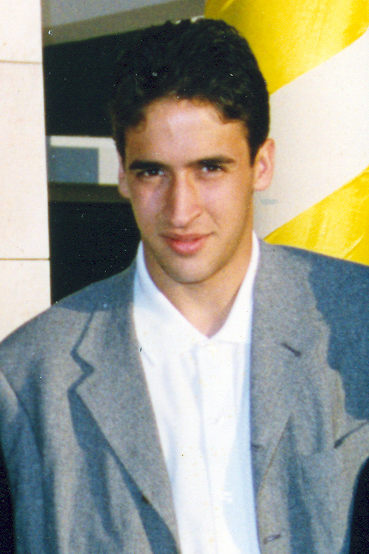
Raúl in 1995

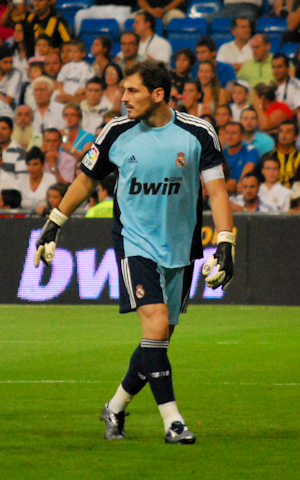
Iker Casillas in 2010

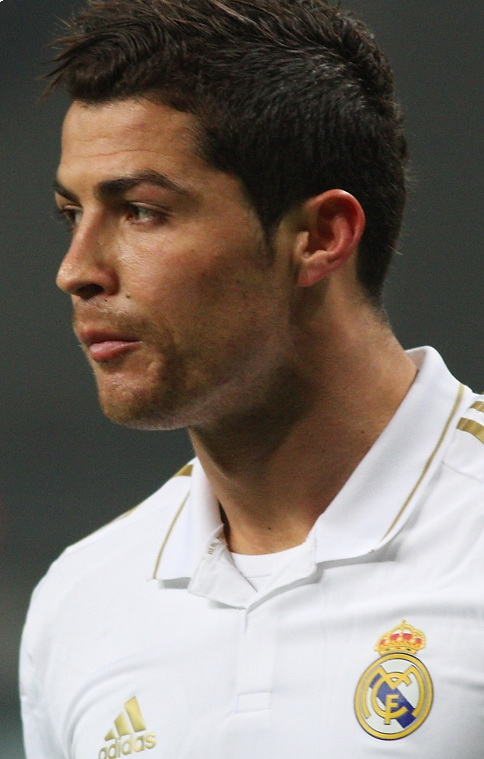
Cristiano Ronaldo in 2012

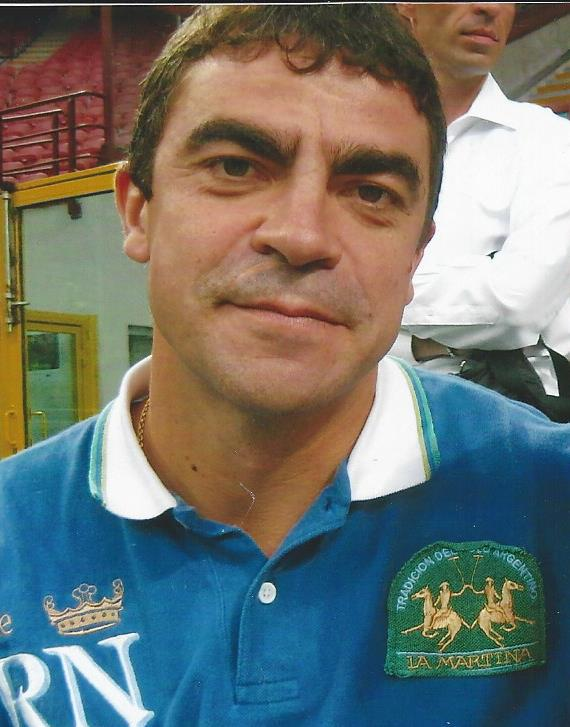
Manolo Sanchís in 2009

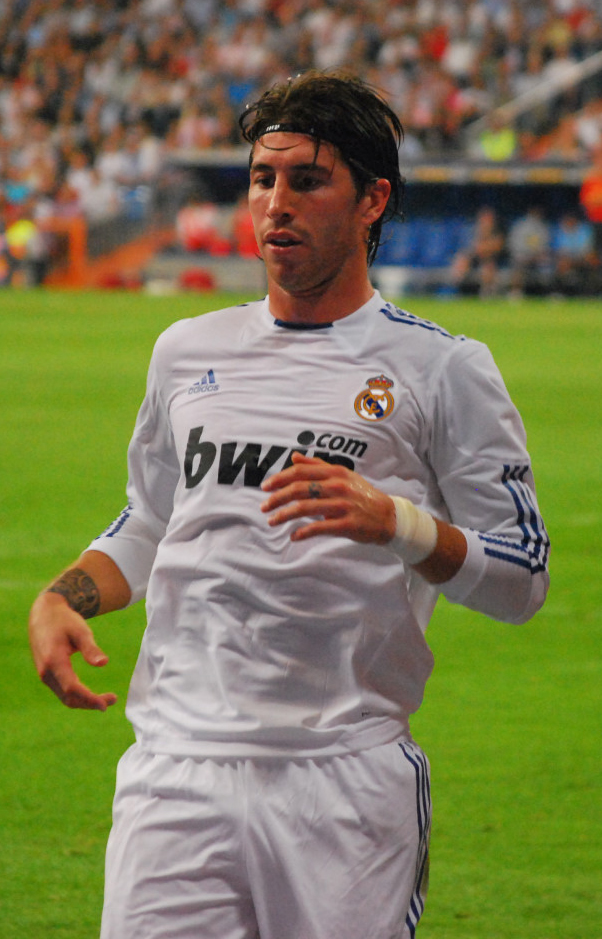
Sergio Ramos in 2010

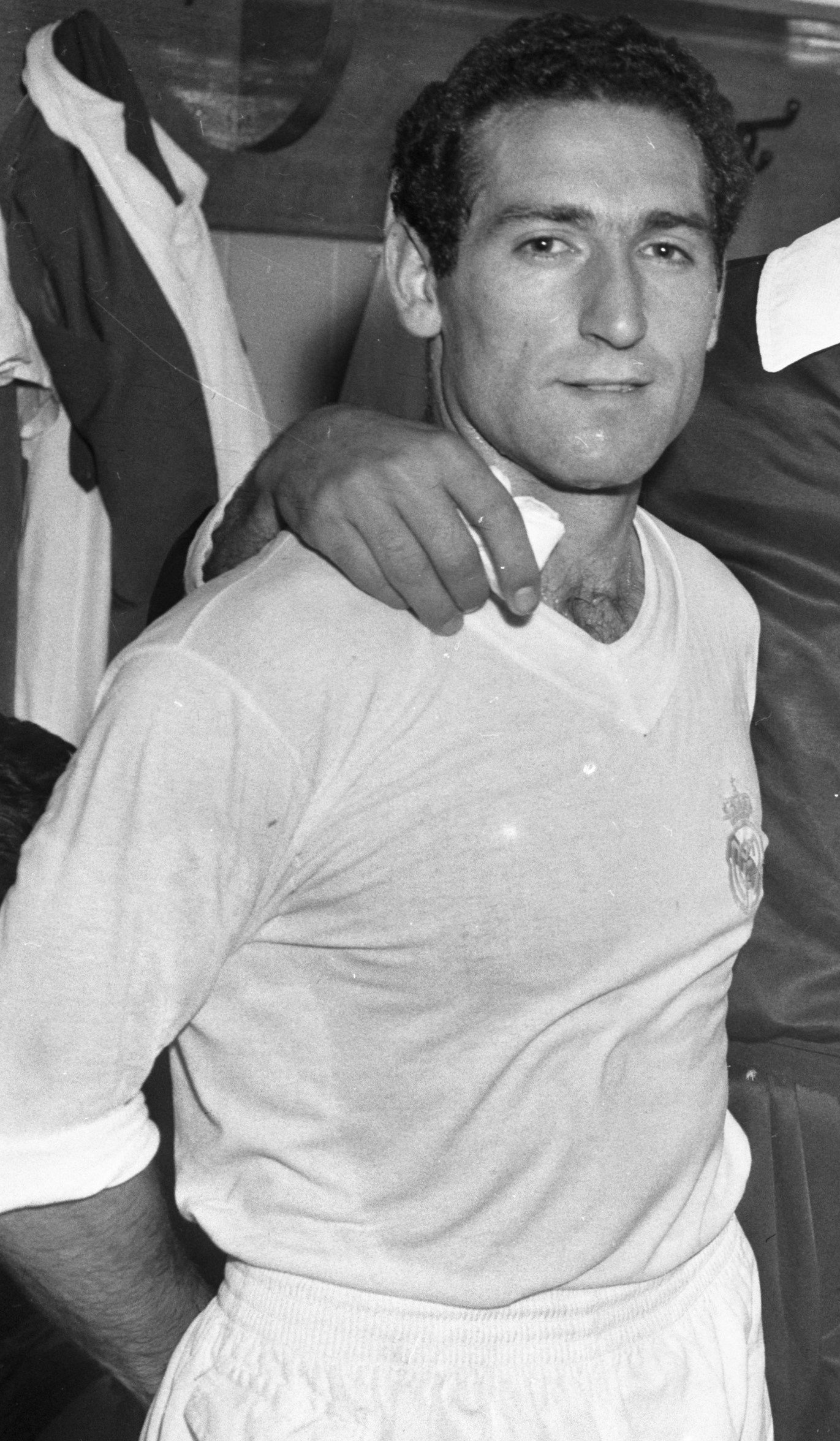
Paco Gento in 1959

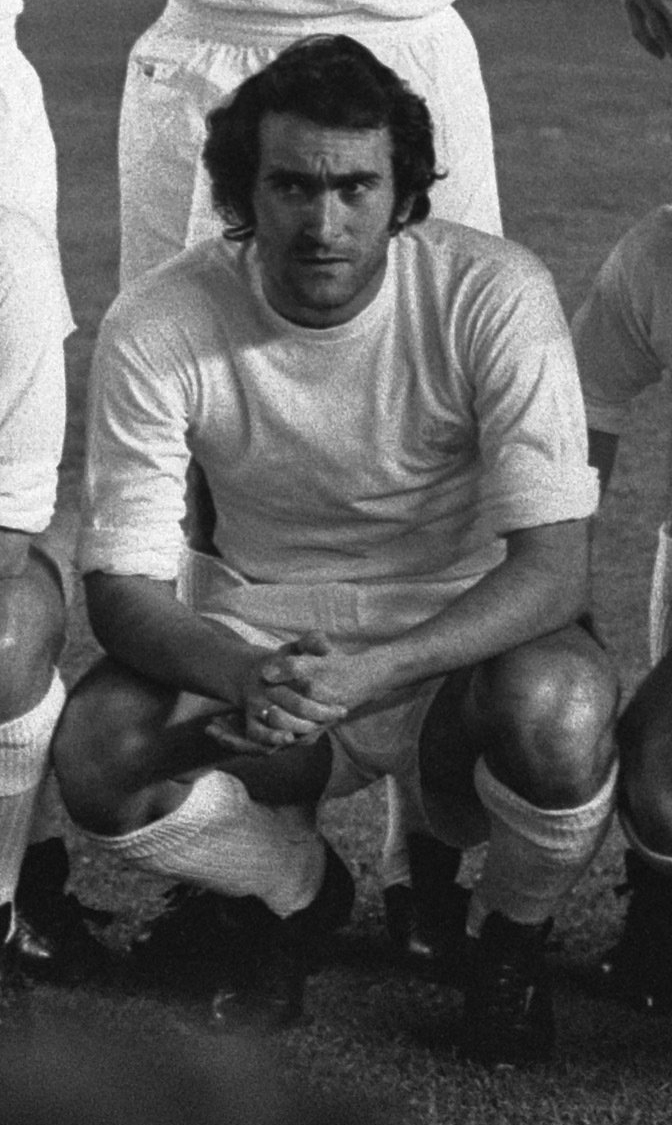
Pirri in 1973

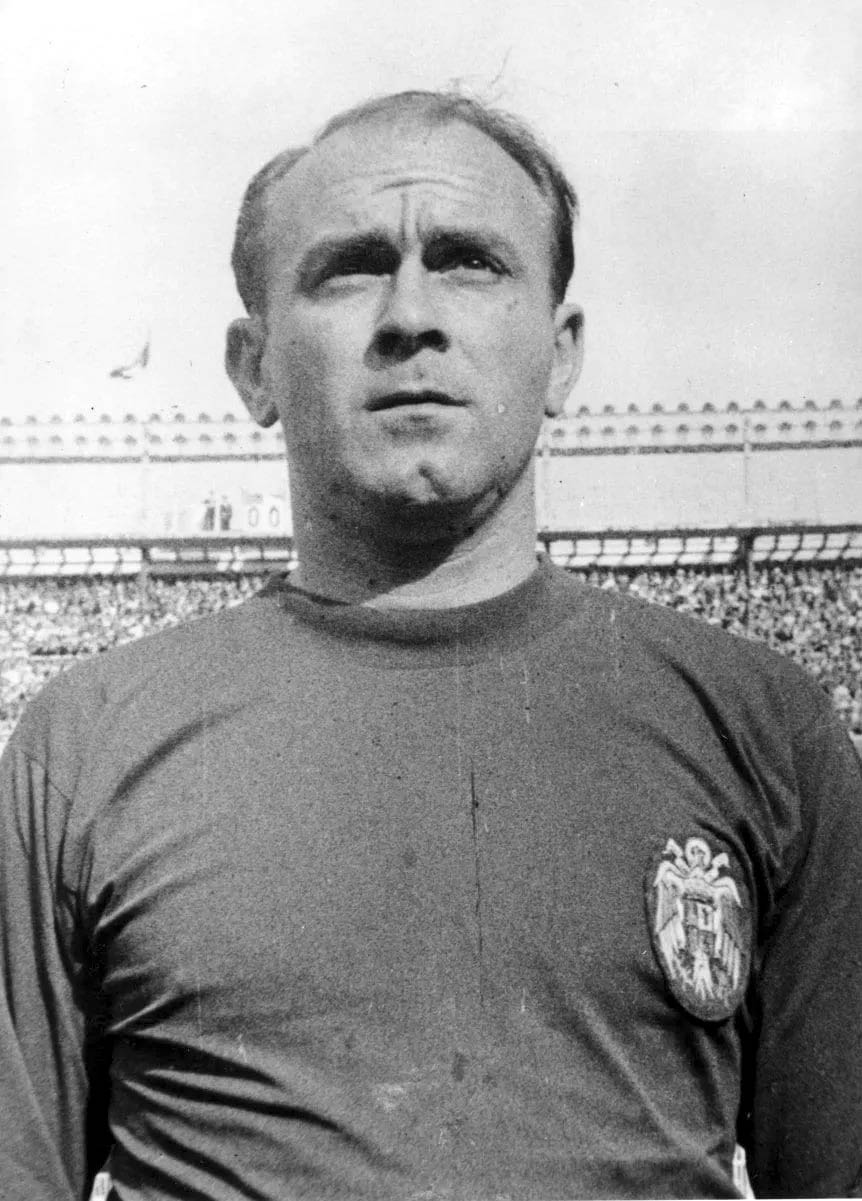
Alfredo Di Stéfano in 1962

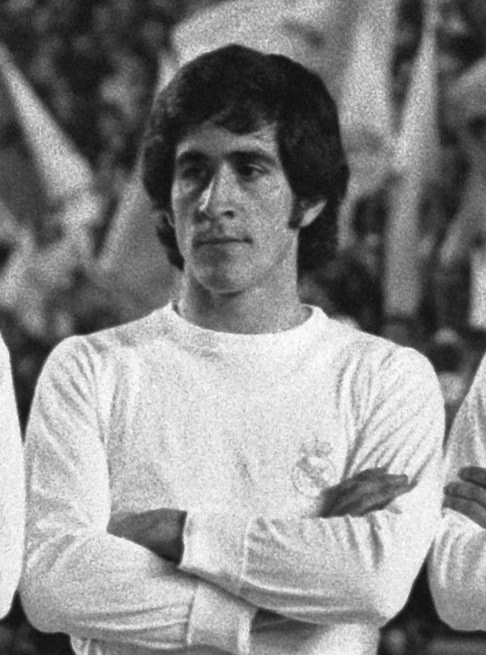
Goyo Benito in 1973

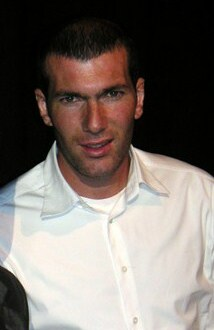
Zinedine Zidane

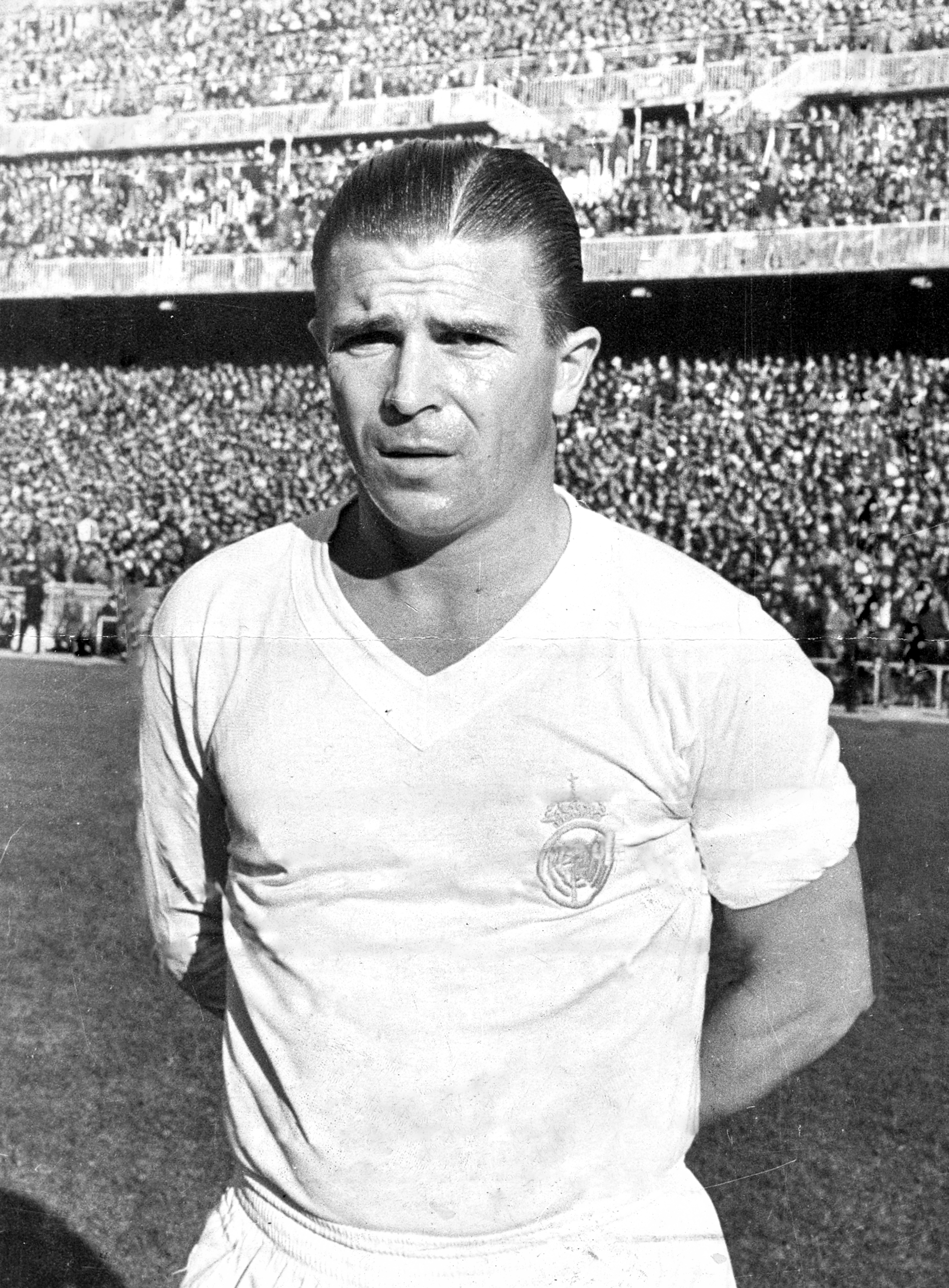
Ferenc Puskás

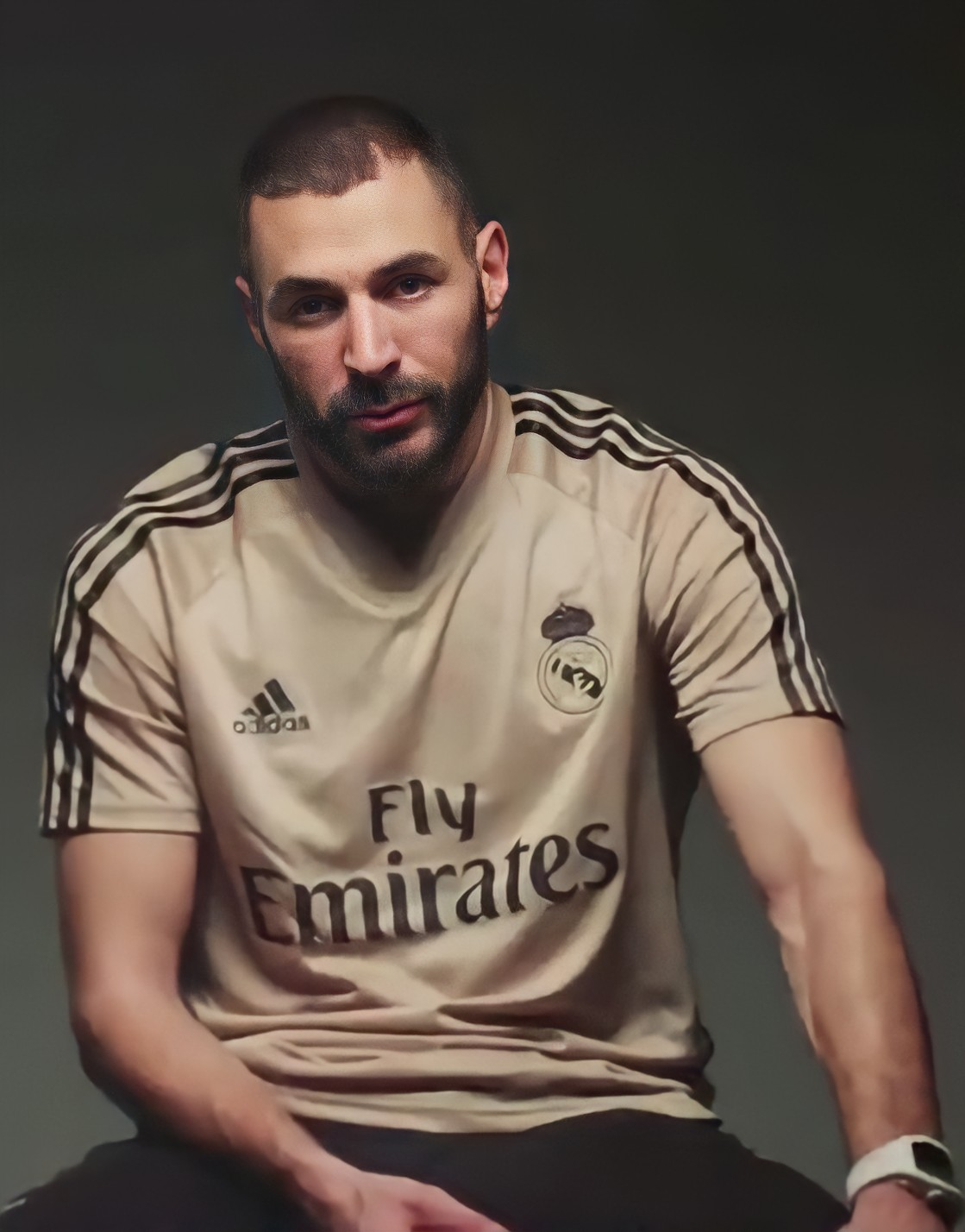
Karim Benzema in 2020

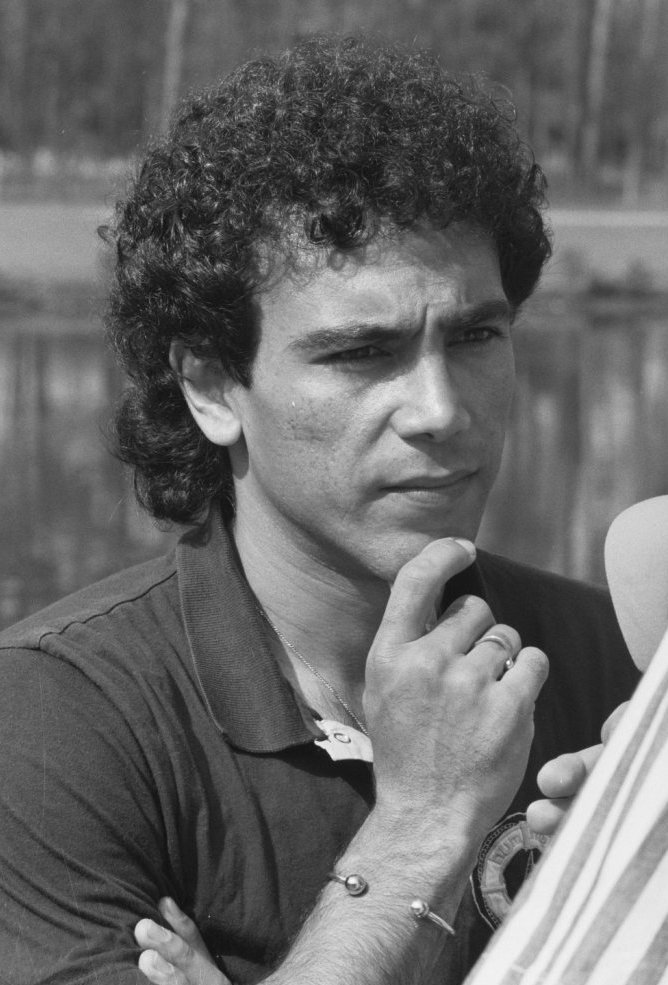
Hugo Sánchez in 1988

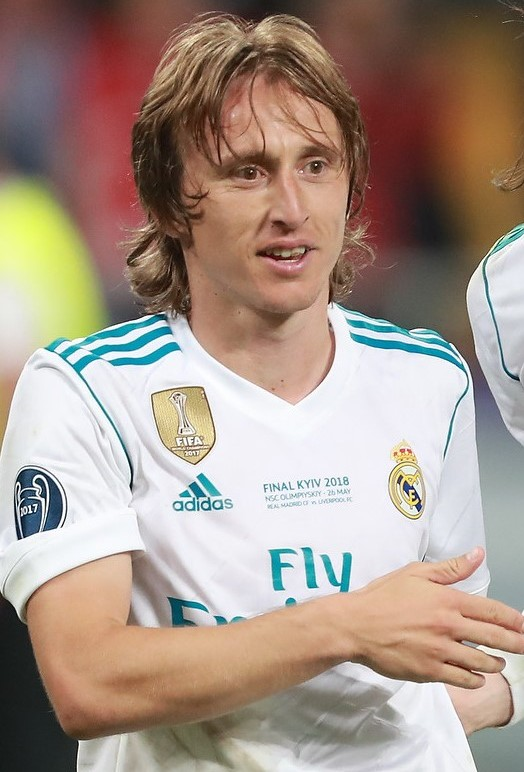
Luka Modrić in 2018

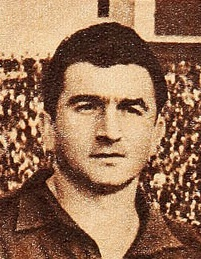
Miguel Muñoz in 1953

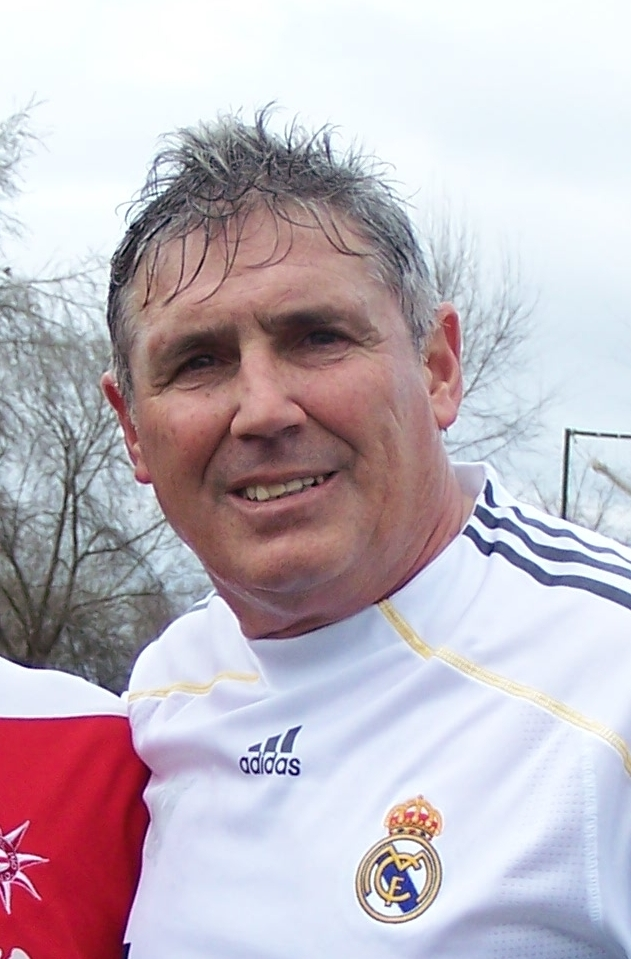
Santillana in 2010

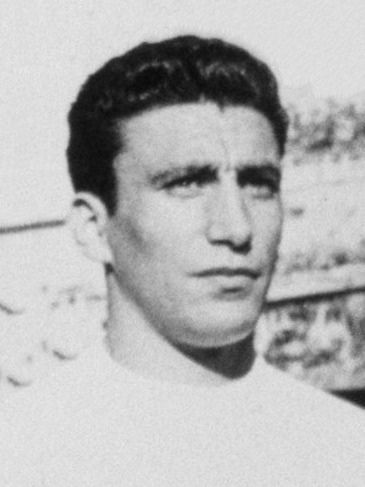
Pachín in 1962

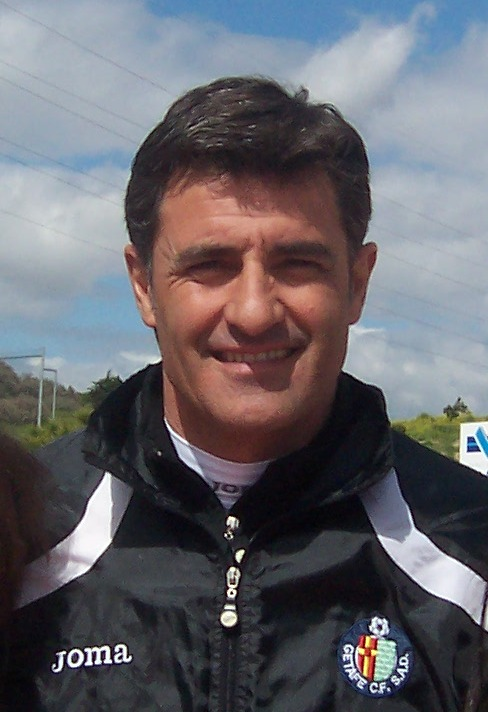
Míchel in 2011

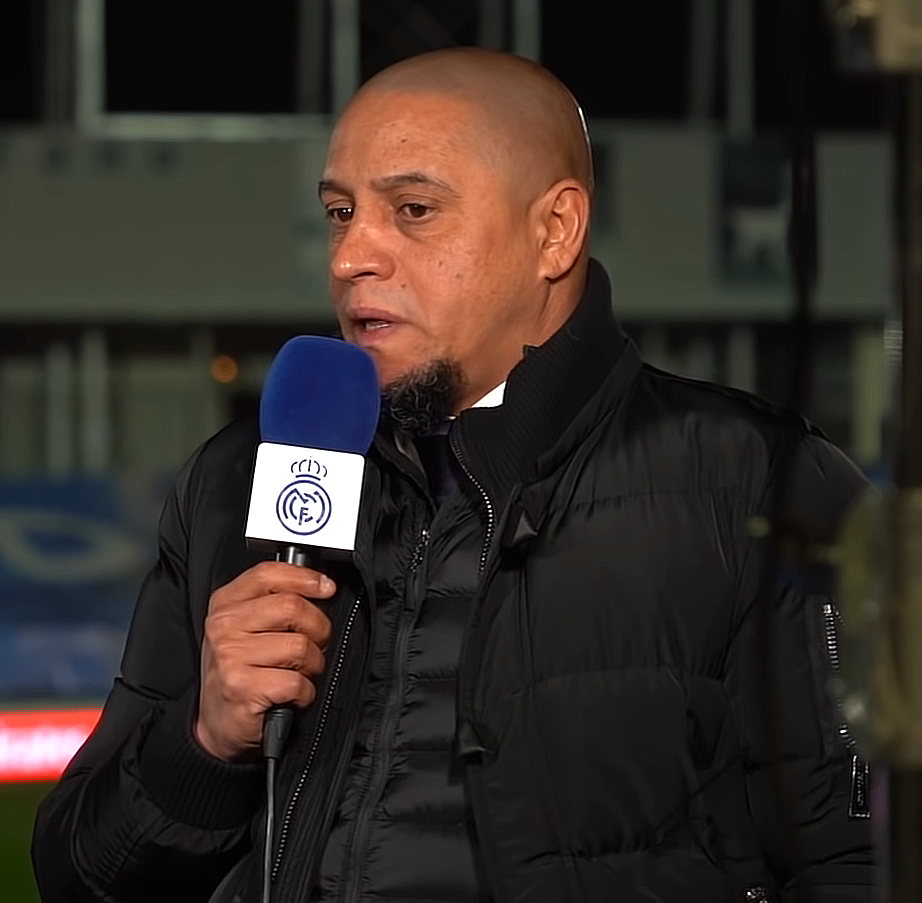
Roberto Carlos in 2021

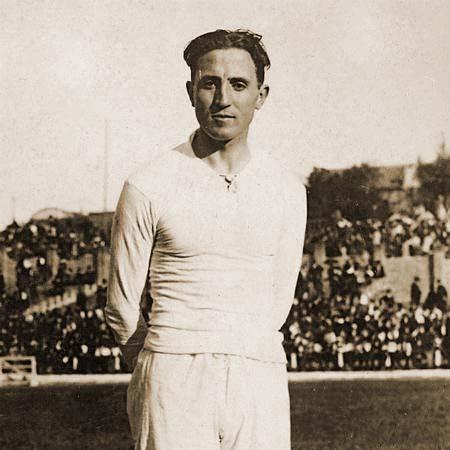
Santiago Bernabéu in 1920s

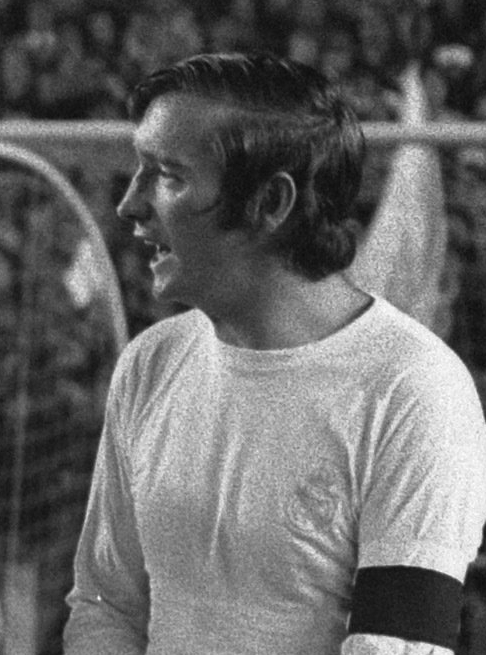
Ignacio Zoco in 1973

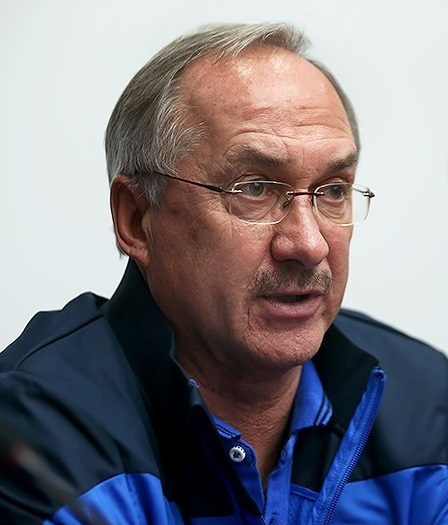
Uli Stielike in 2014

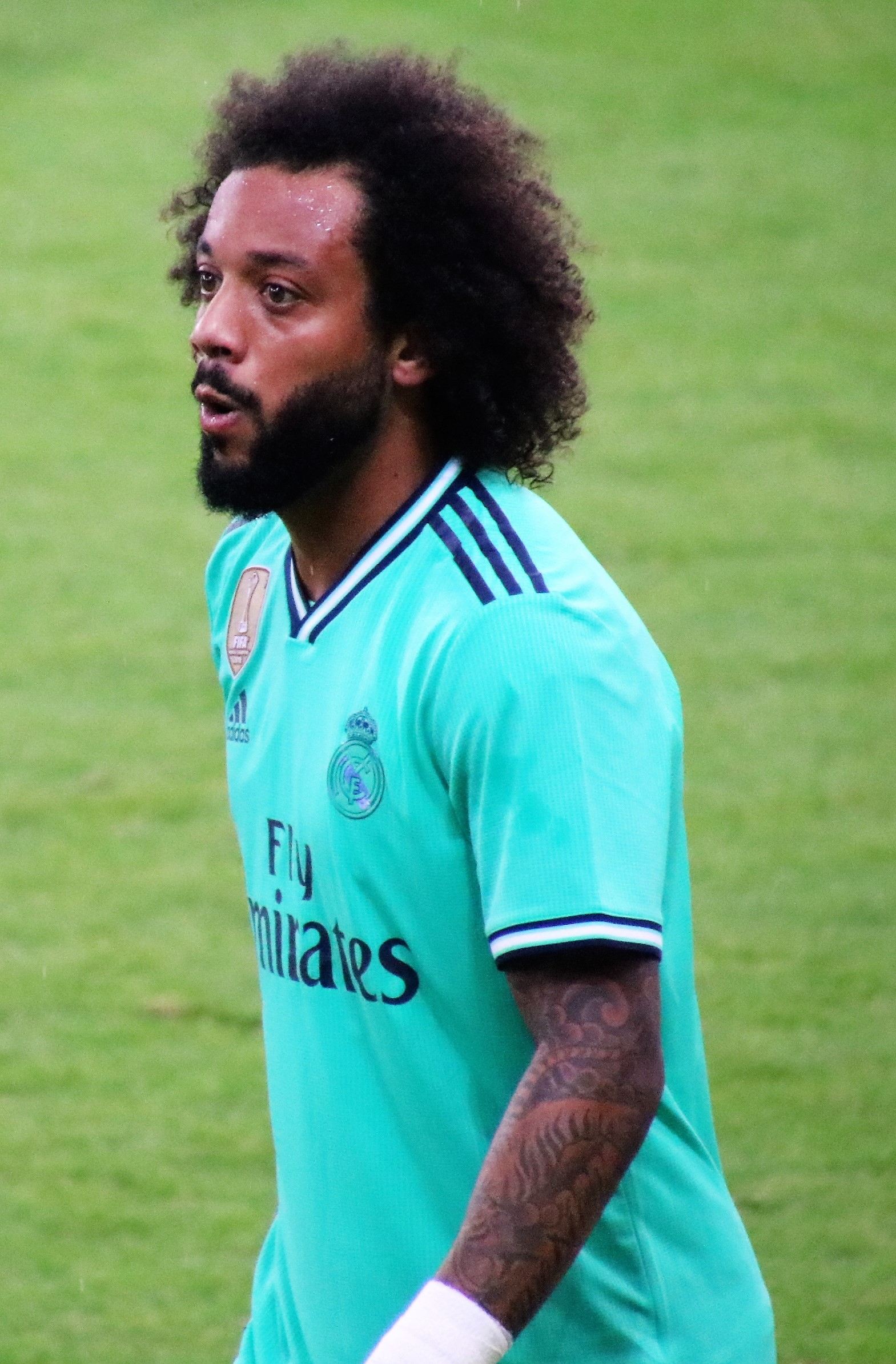
Marcelo in 2019

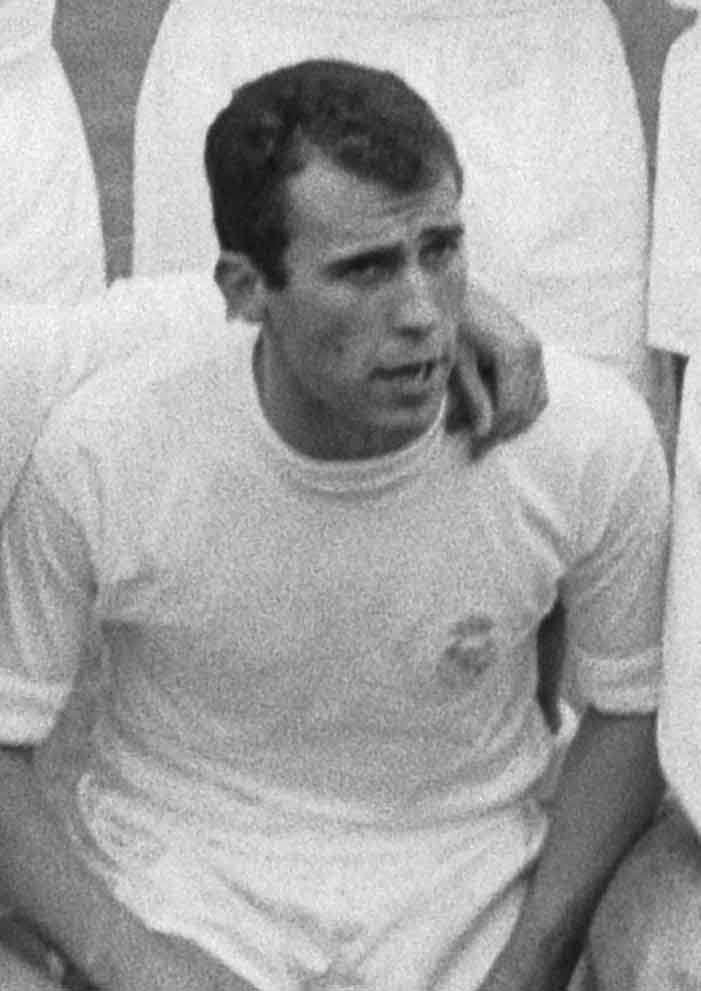
Amancio in 1966

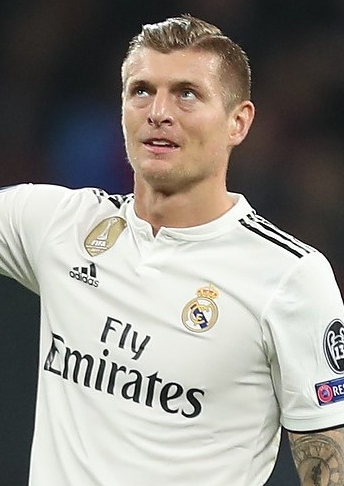
Toni Kroos in 2018

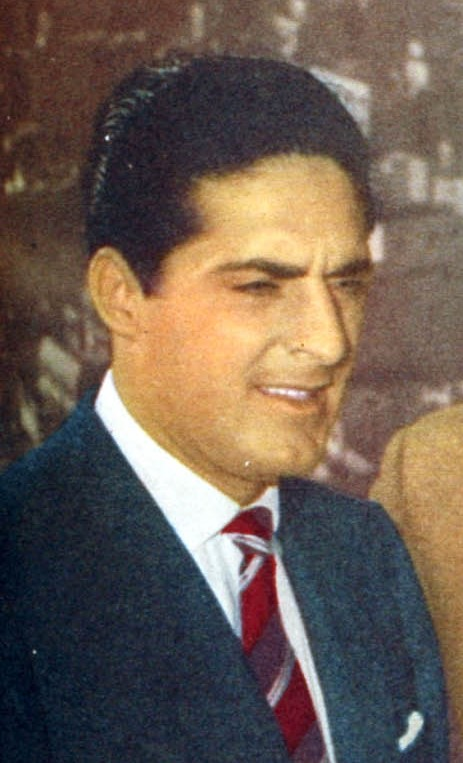
Héctor Rial in 1958

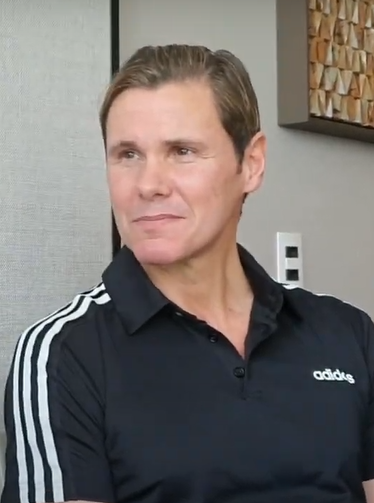
Fernando Redondo in 2019

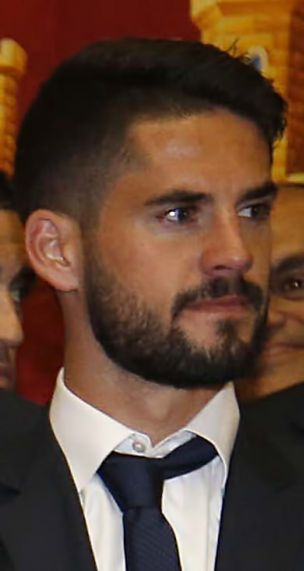
Isco in 2016

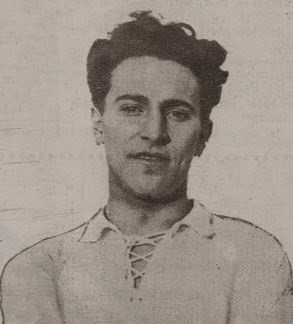
Félix Quesada in 1929

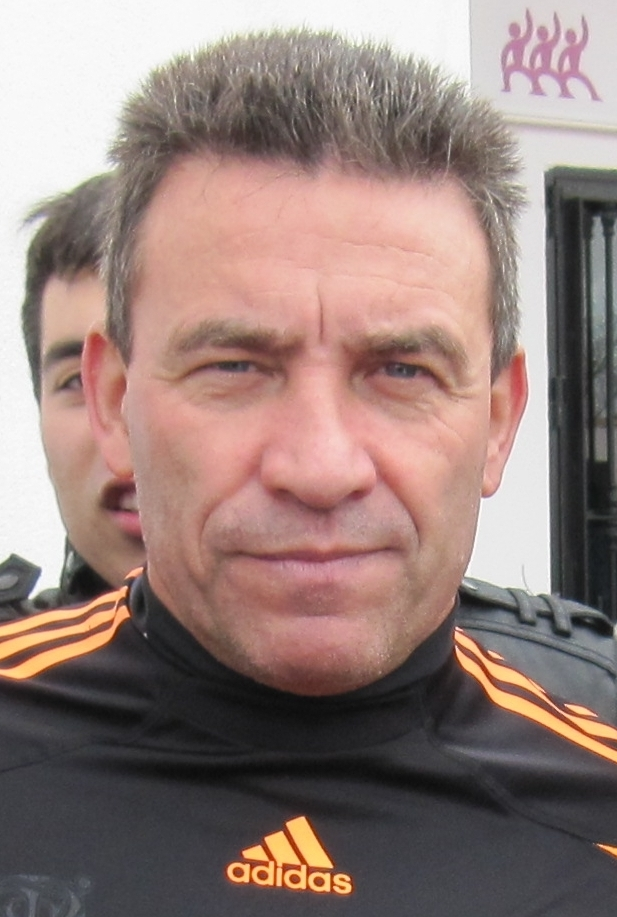
Francisco Buyo in 2010s

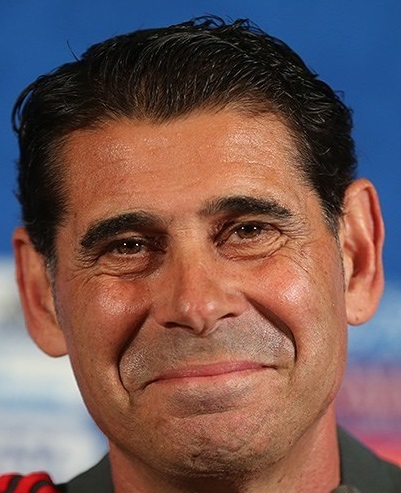
Fernando Hierro in 2018

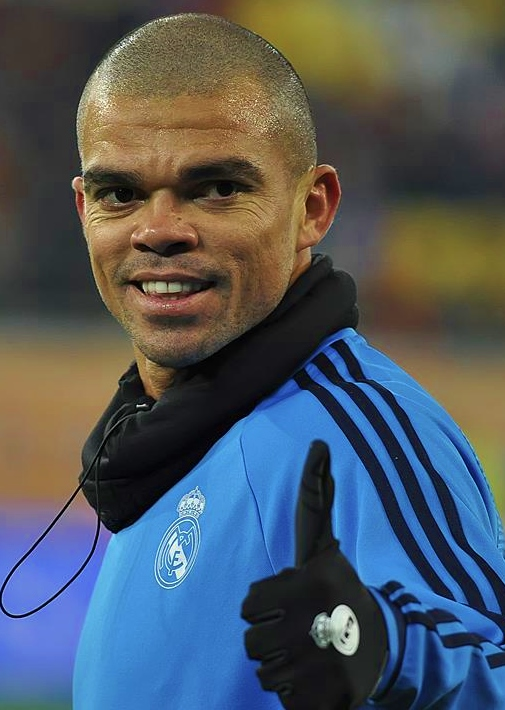
Pepe in 2015

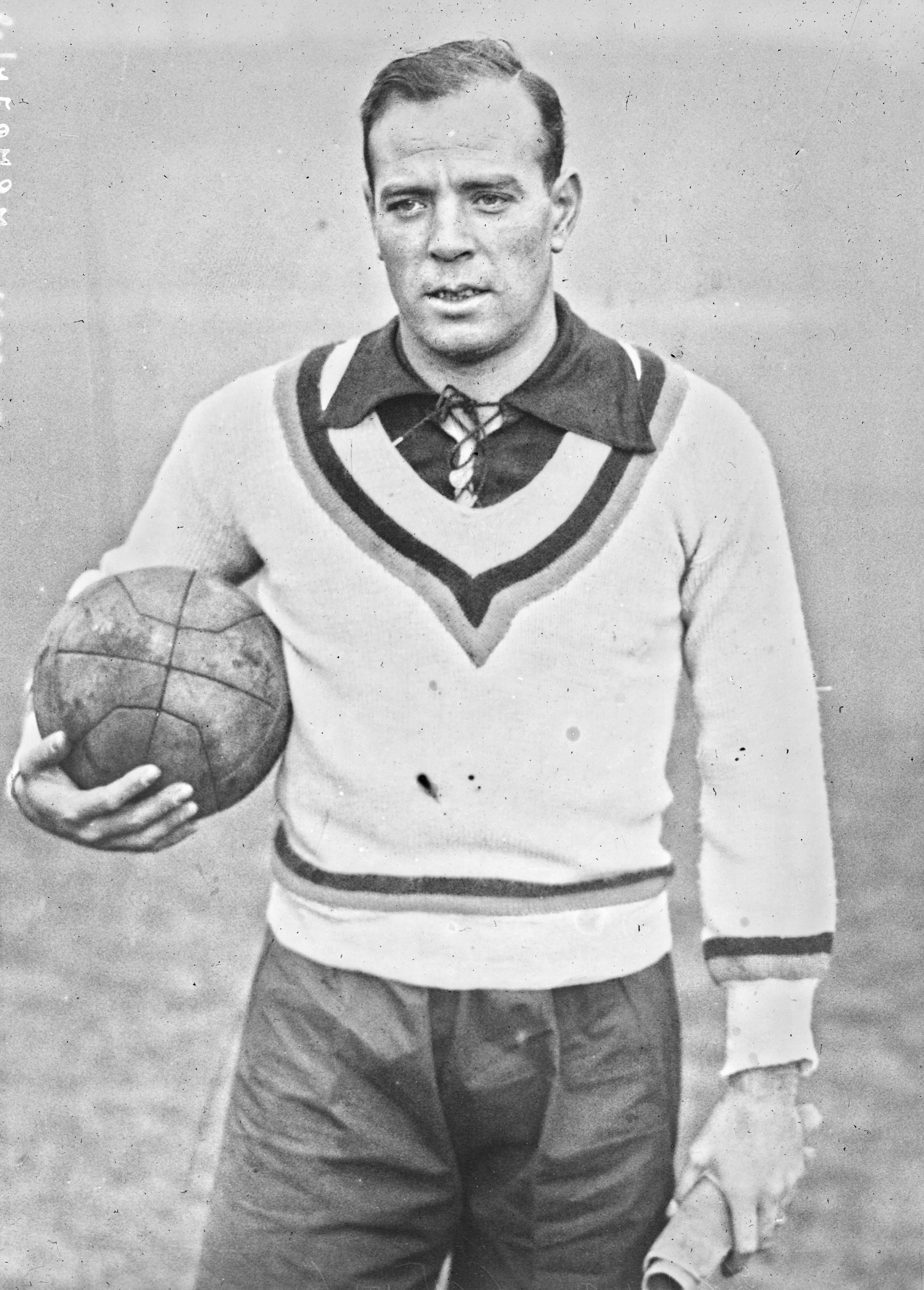
Ricardo Zamora in 1931

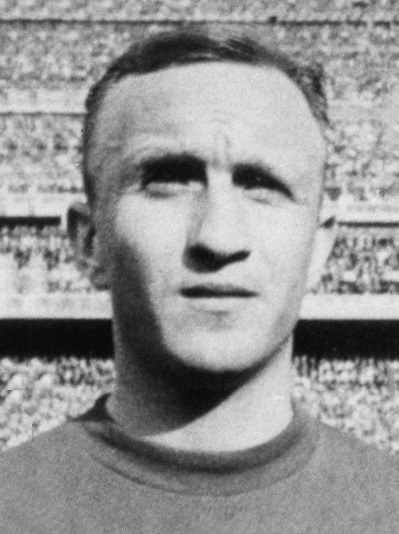
José Santamaría in 1962

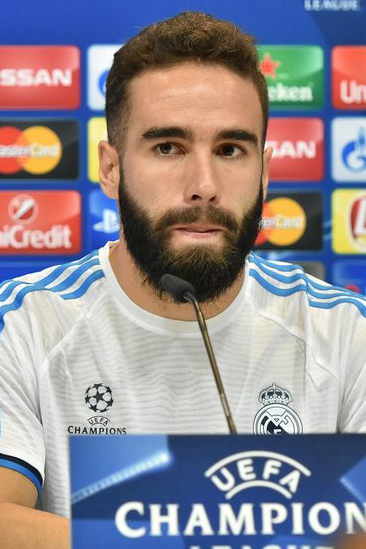
Dani Carvajal in 2015

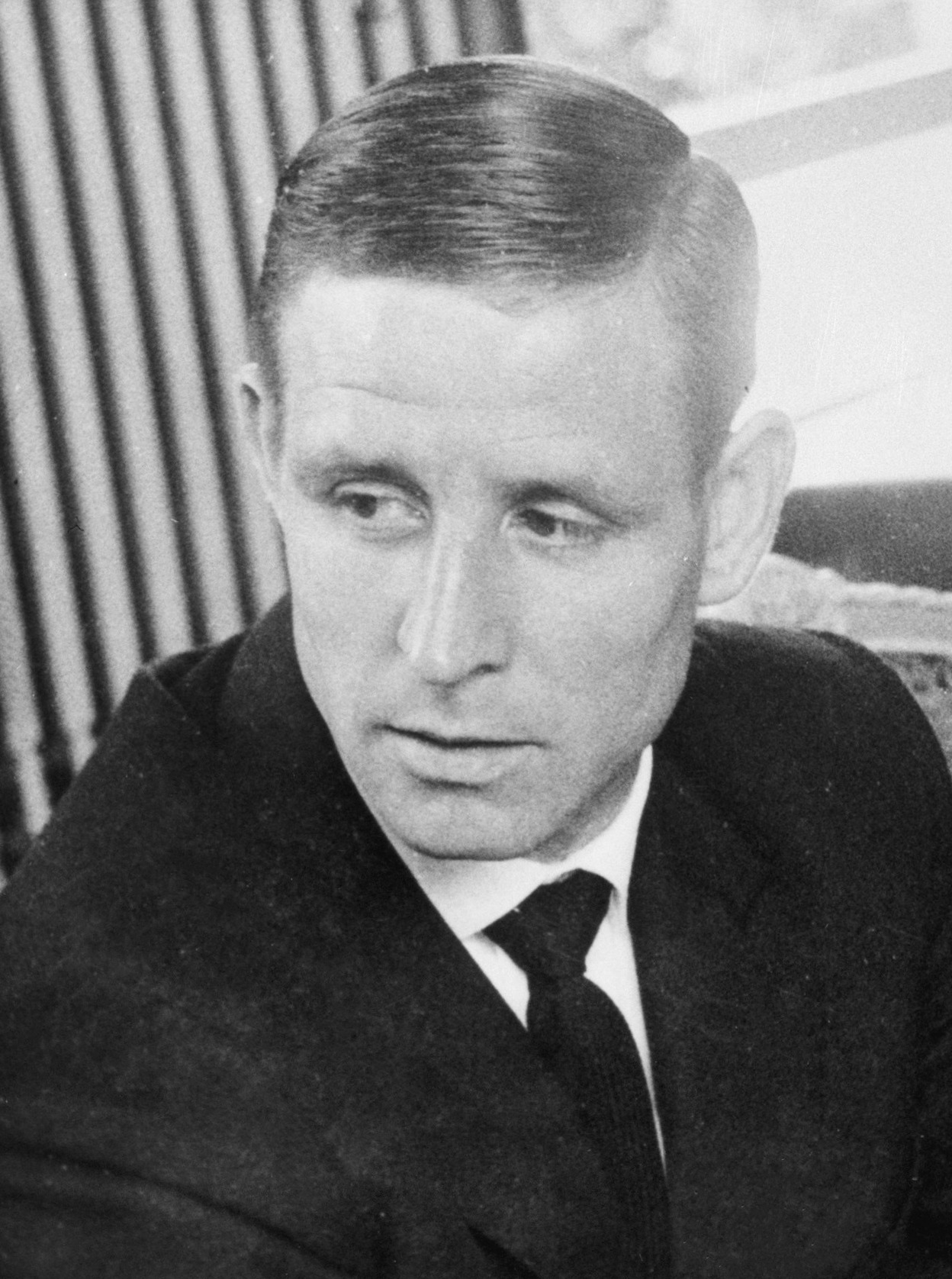
Raymond Kopa in 1963

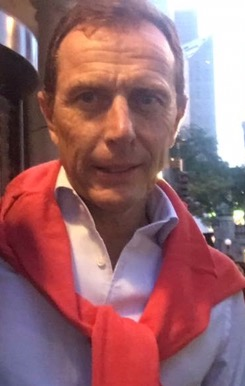
Emilio Butragueño in 2017

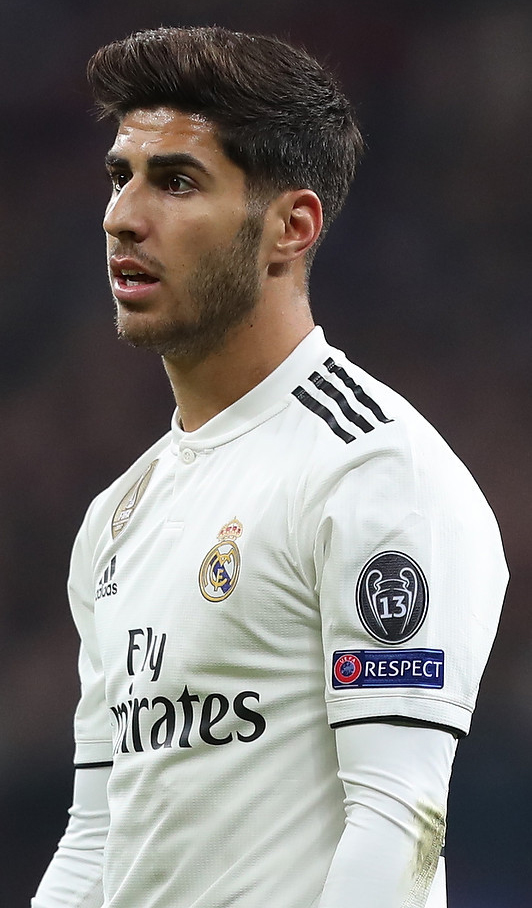
Marco Asensio in 2018

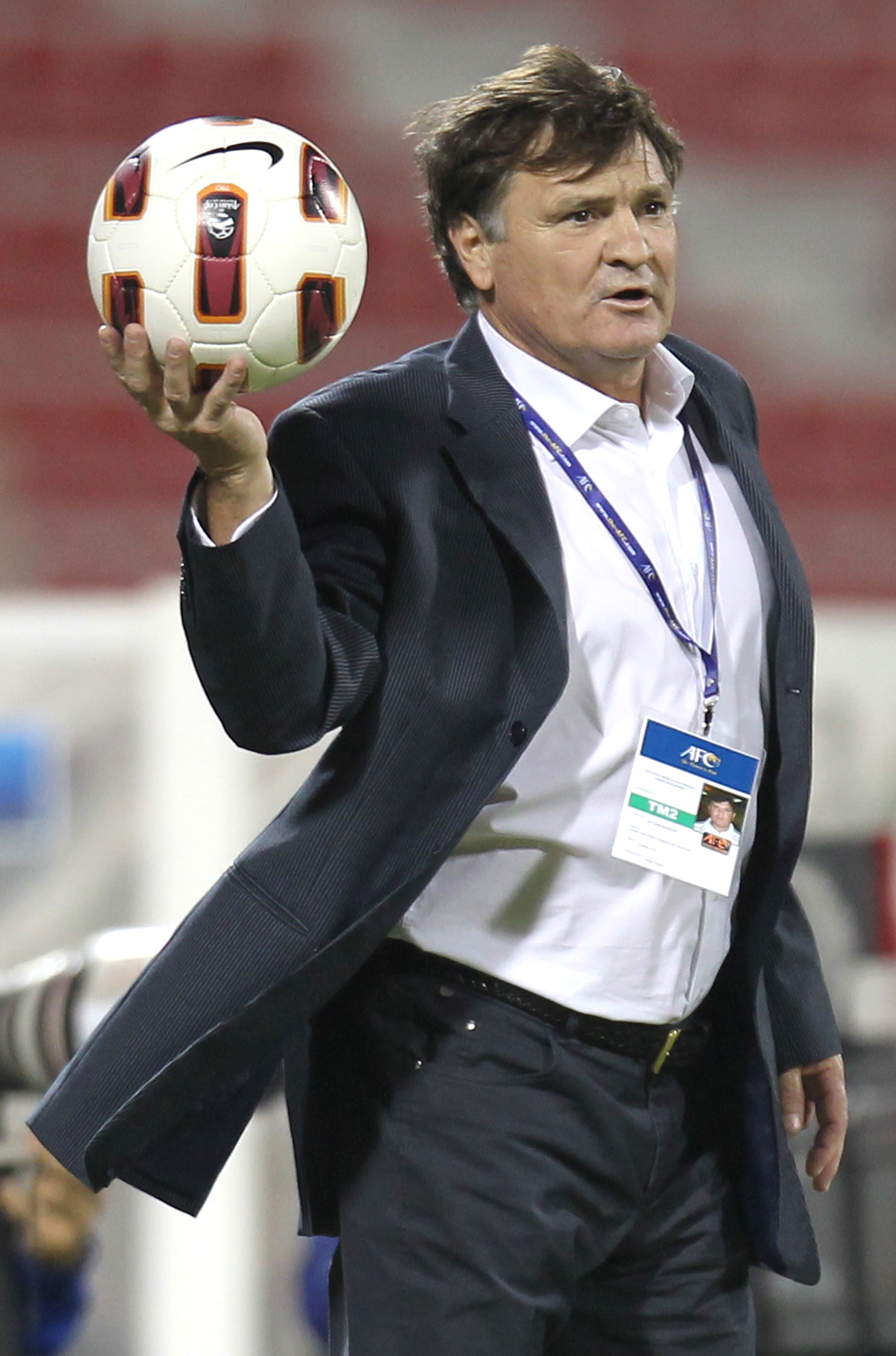
Jose Antonio Camacho in 2011

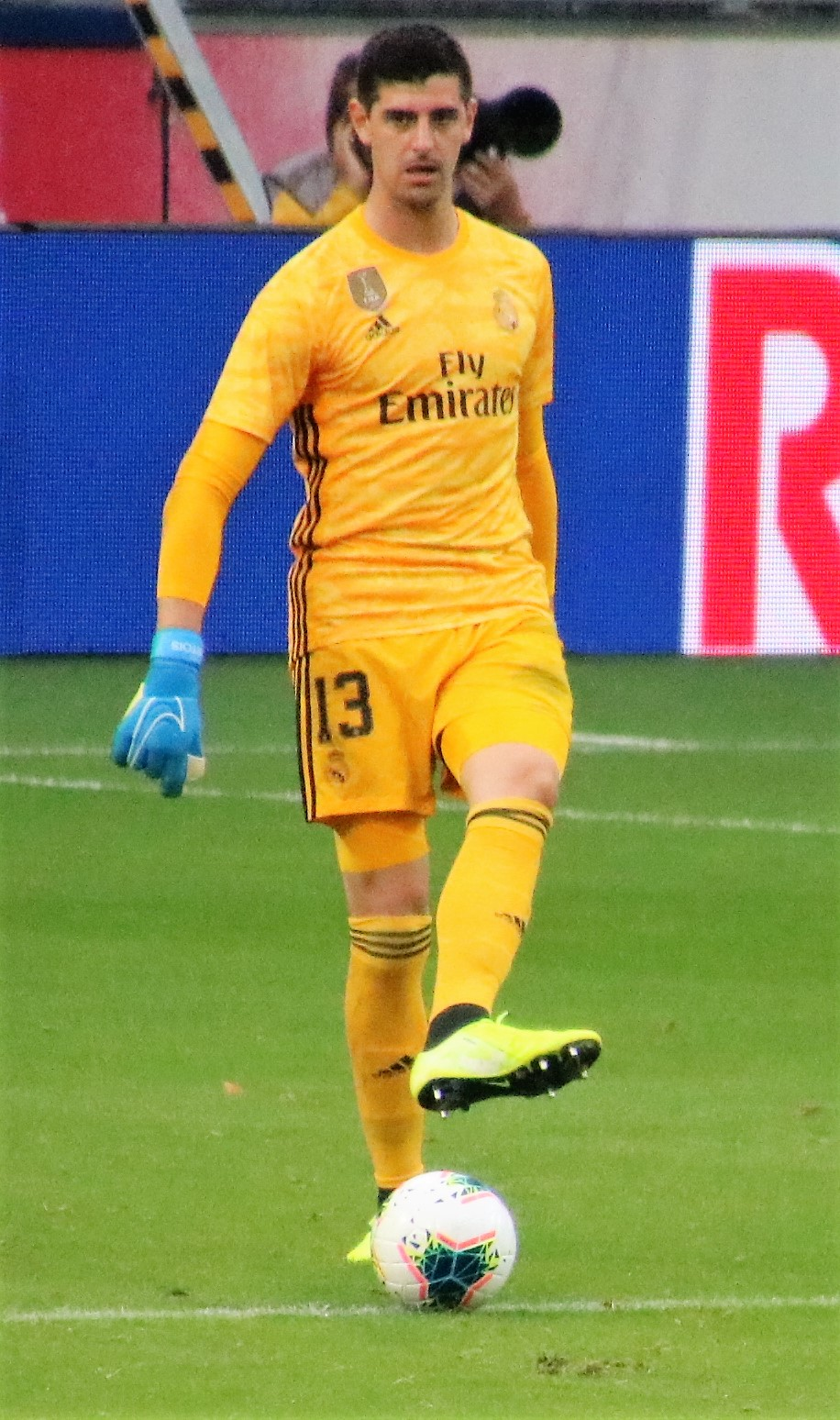
Thibaut Courtois in 2019

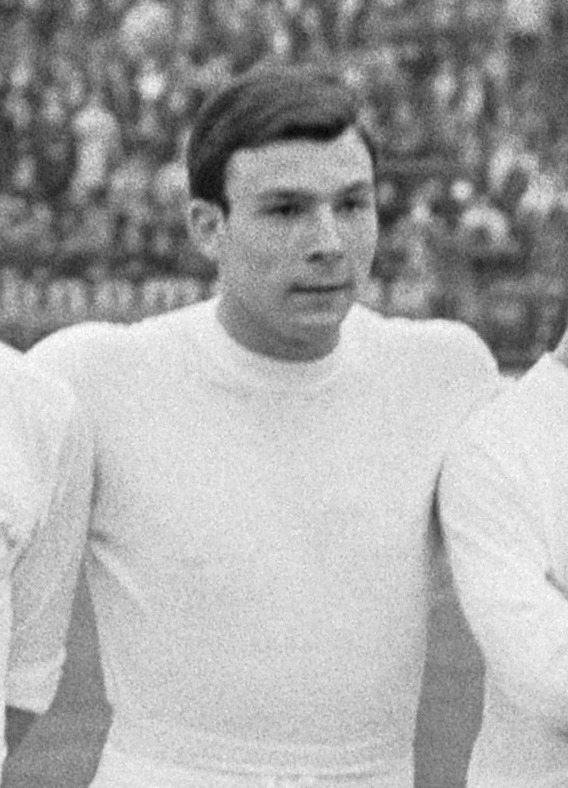
Pedro de Felipe in 1966

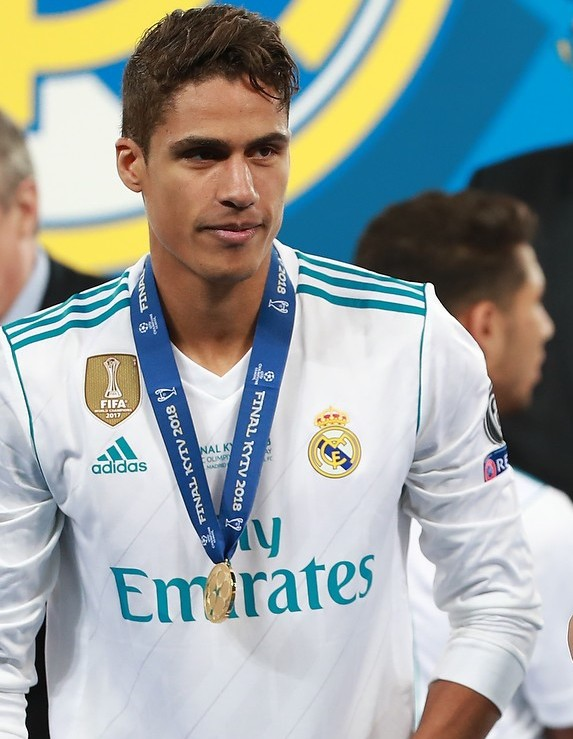
Raphaël Varane in 2018

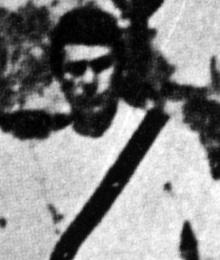
Arthur Johnson in 1902

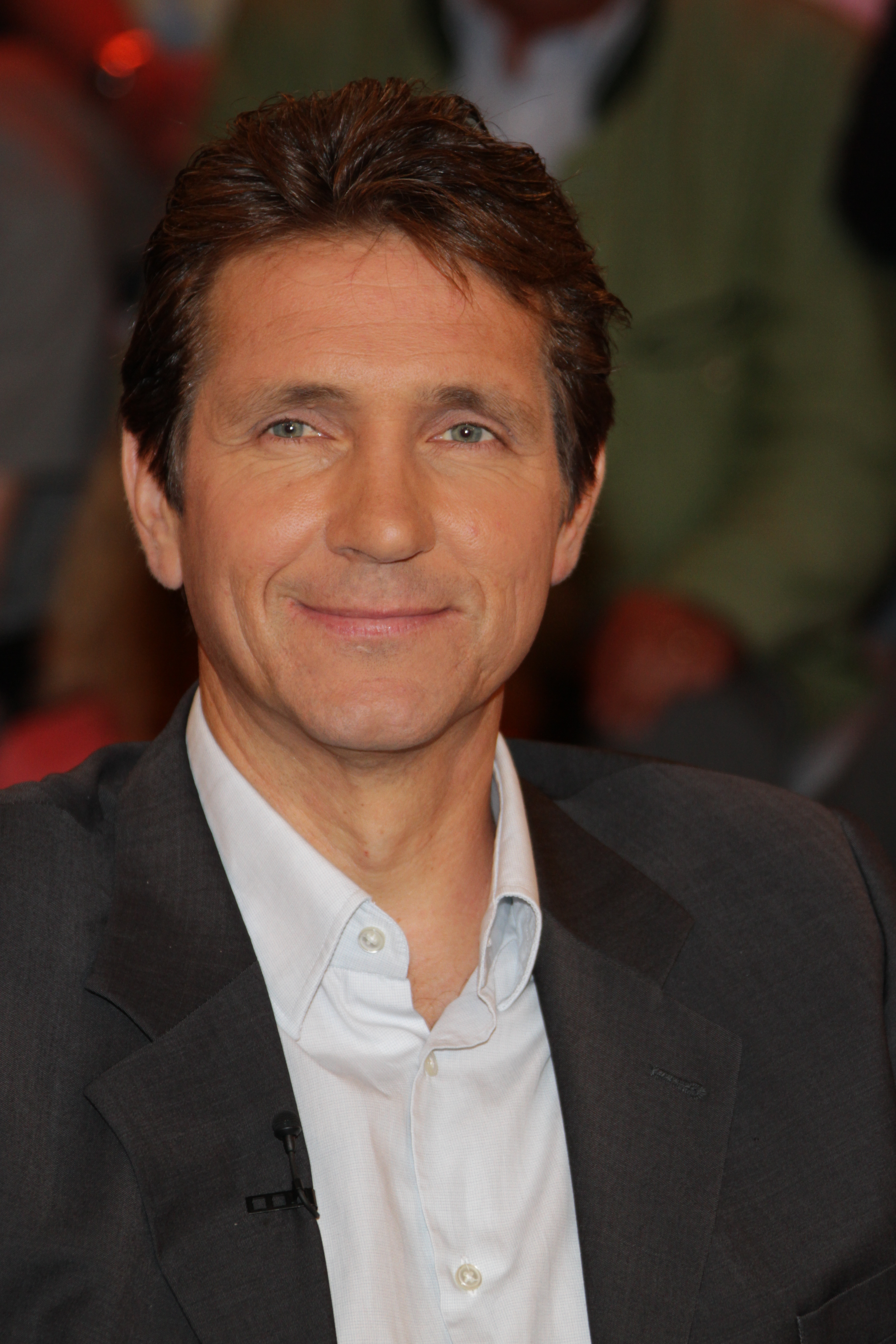
Bodo Illgner in 2012

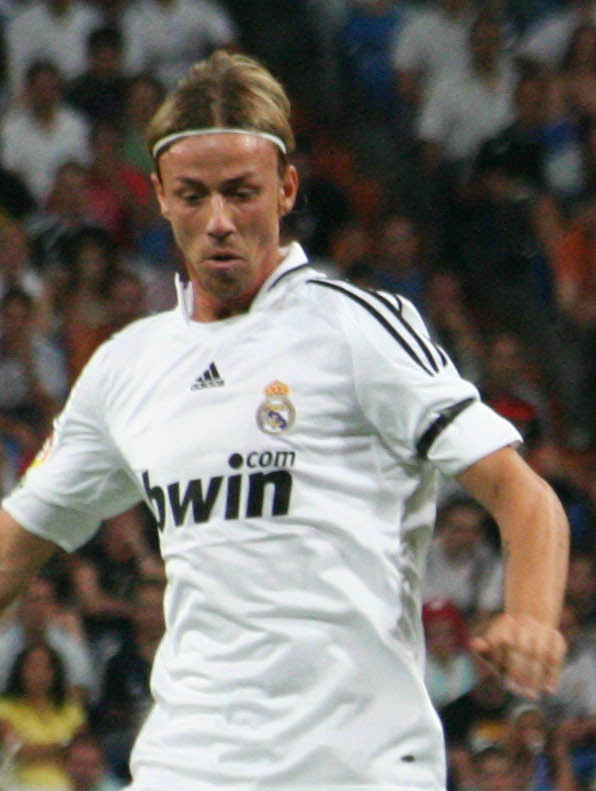
Guti in 2008

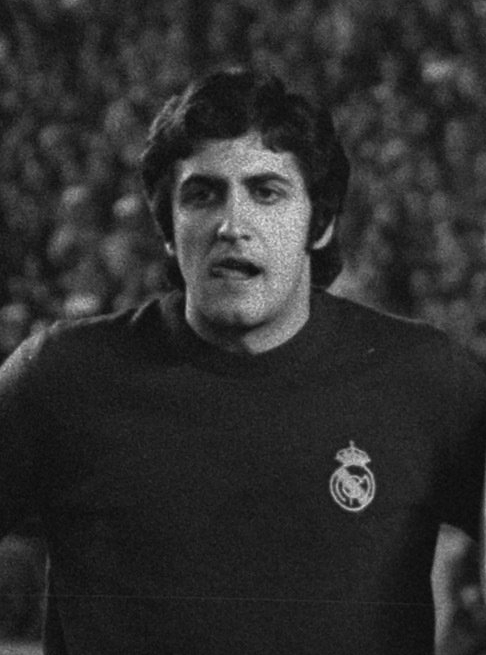
García Remón in 1973

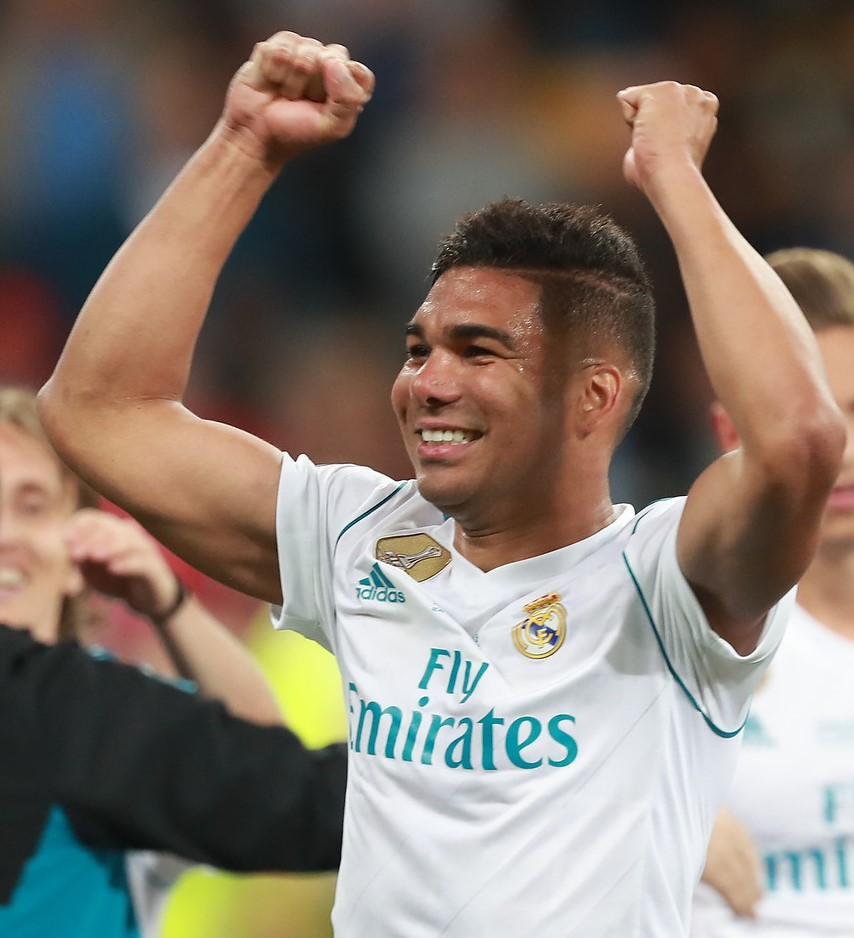
Casemiro in 2018

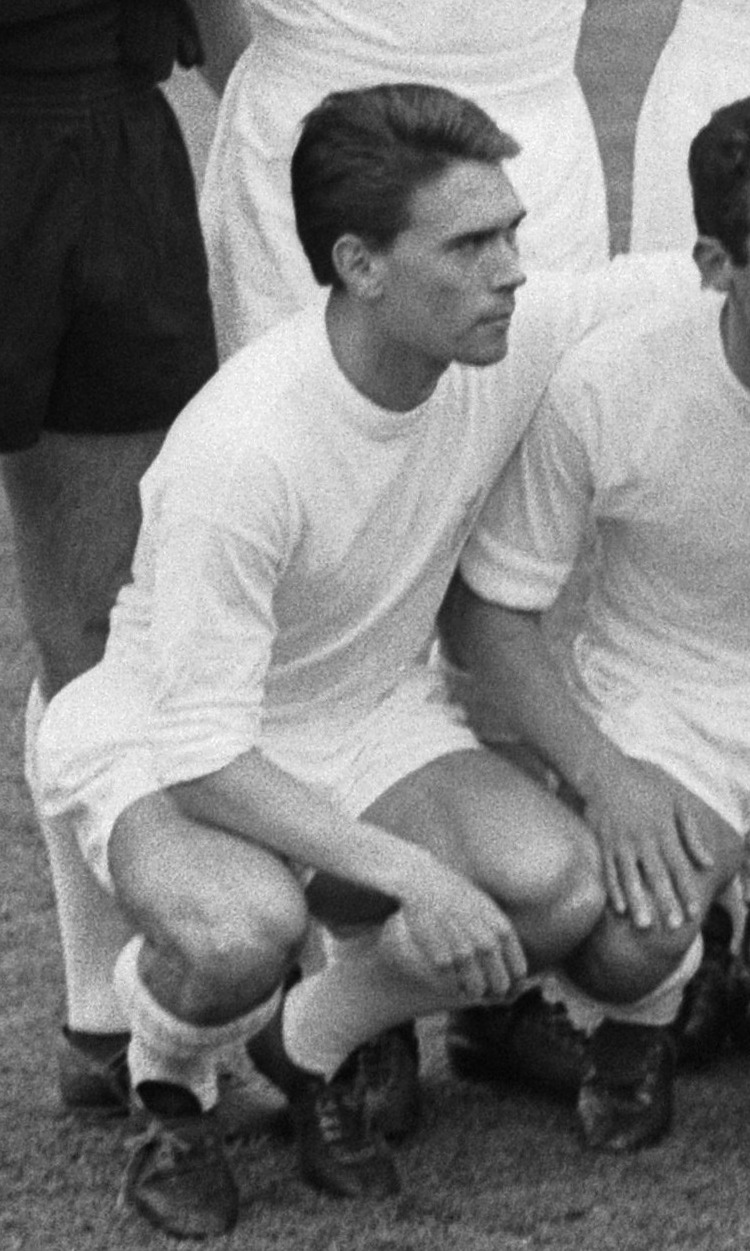
Fernando Serena in 1966

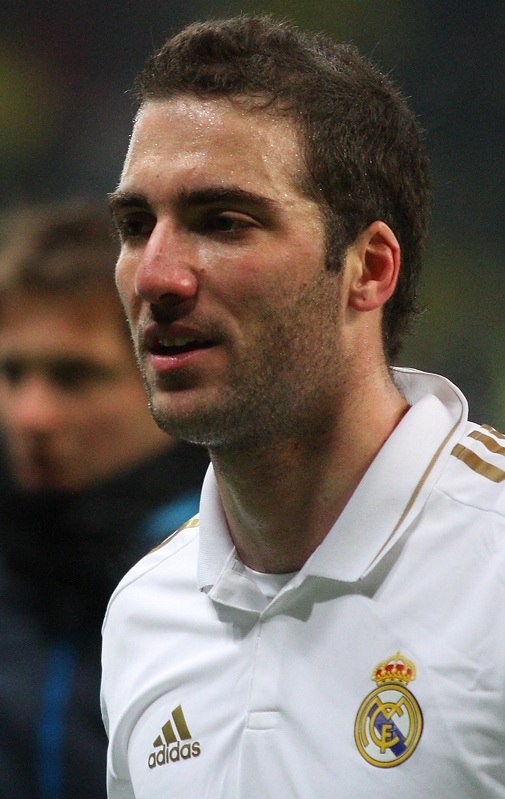
Gonzalo Higuaín in 2012

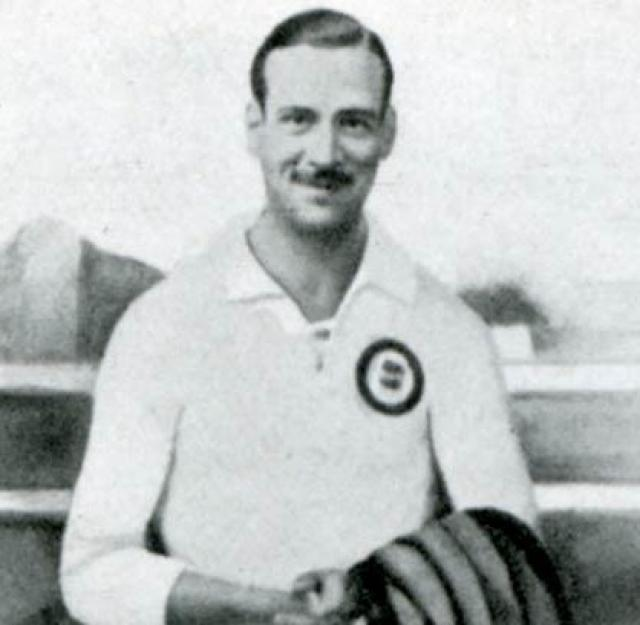
Sotero Aranguren in 1910s

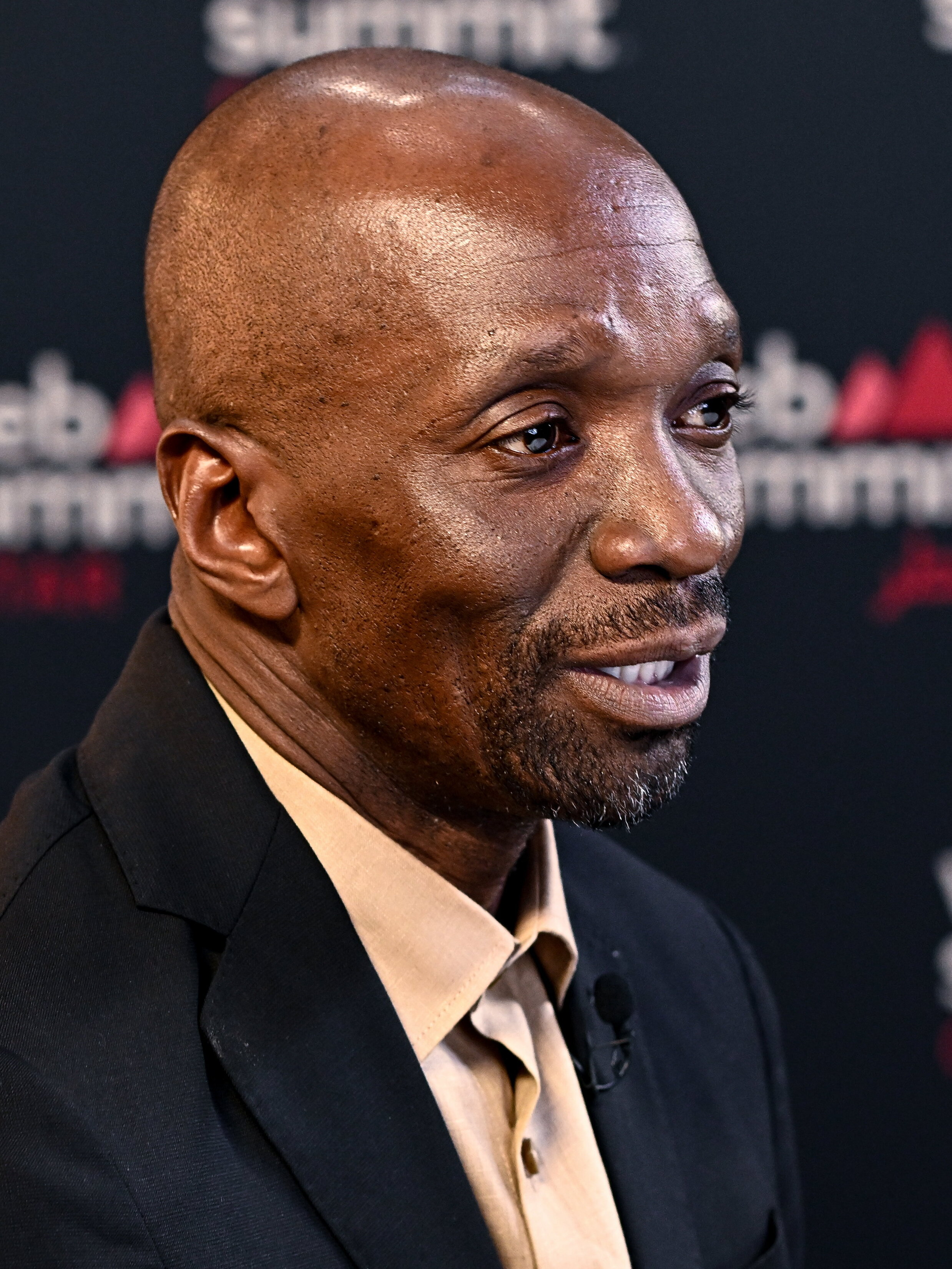
Claude Makélélé in 2024

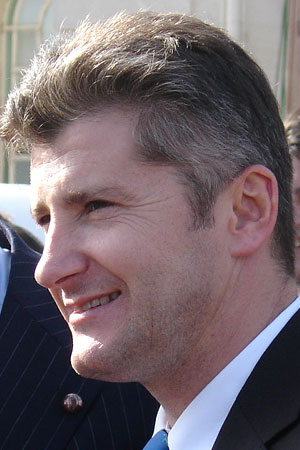
Davor Šuker in 2008

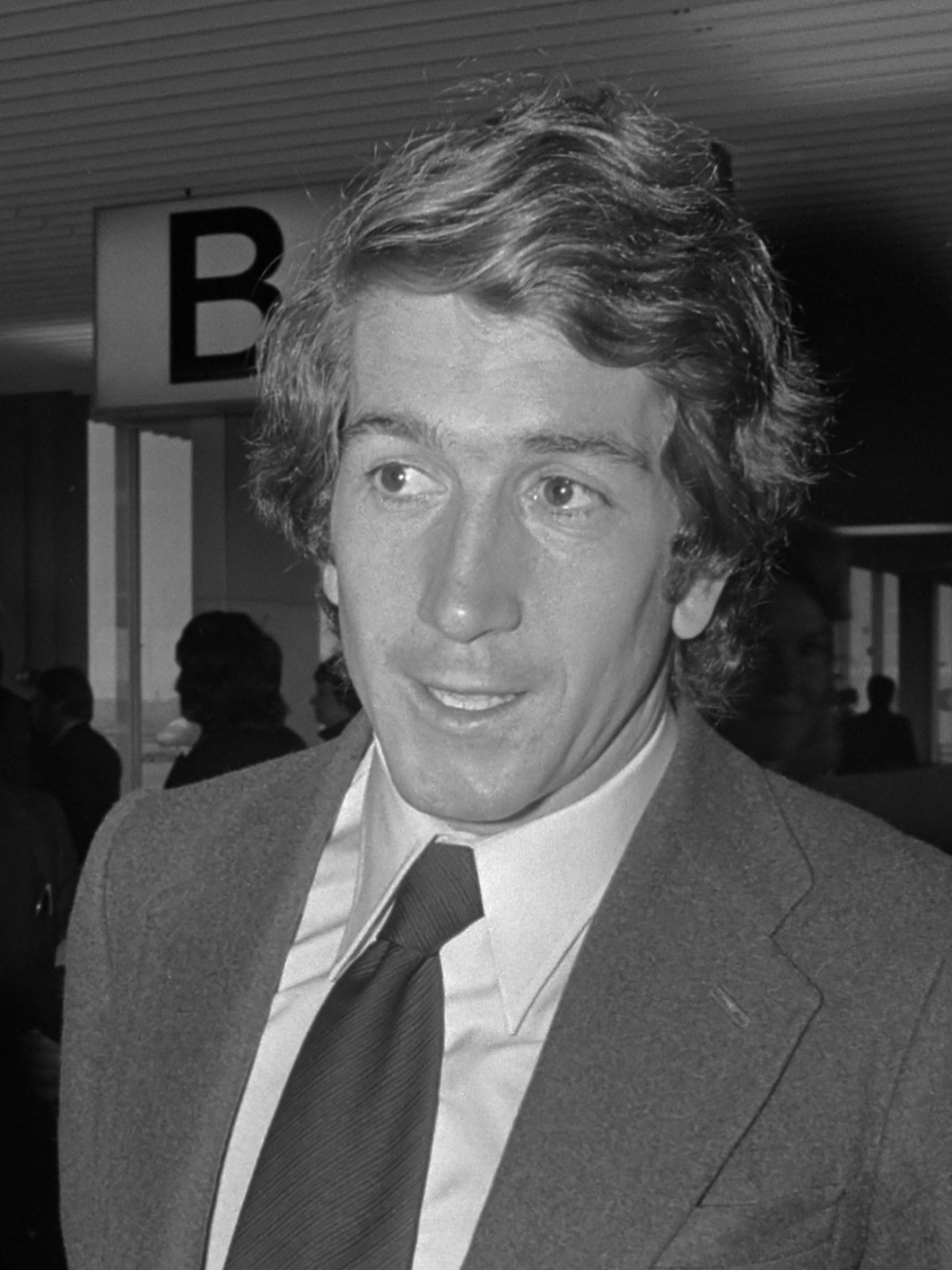
Manuel Velázquez in 1973

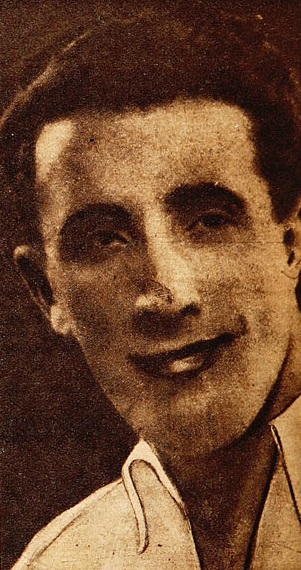
Juan Antonio Ipiña in 1947

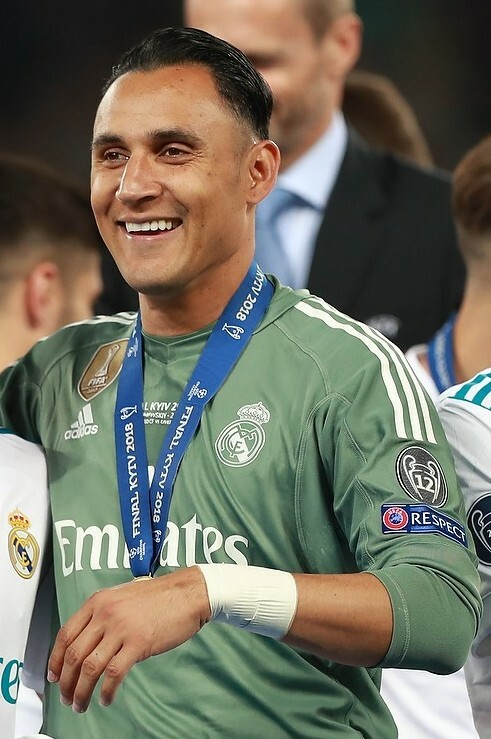
Keylor Navas in 2018

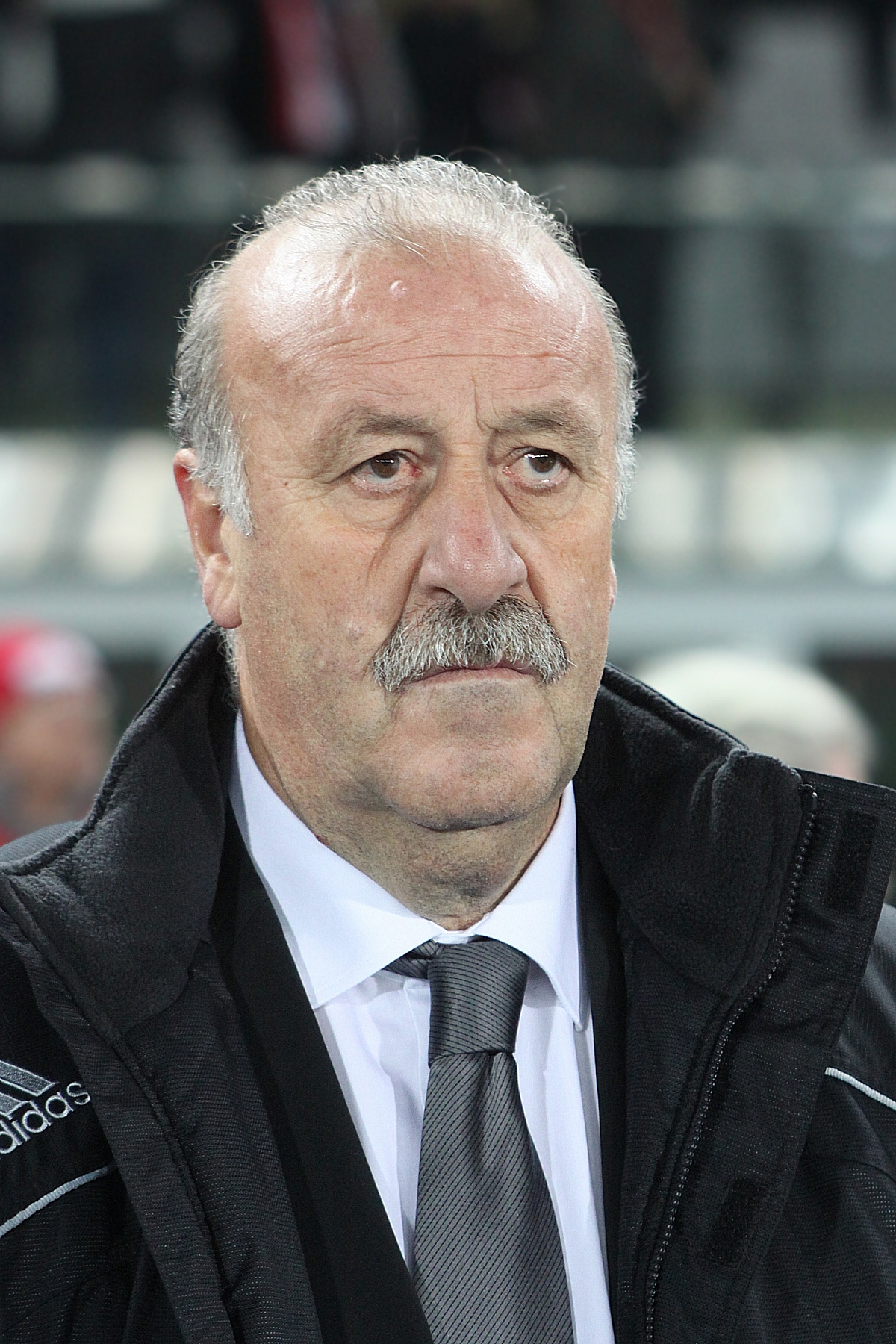
Vicente del Bosque in 2009

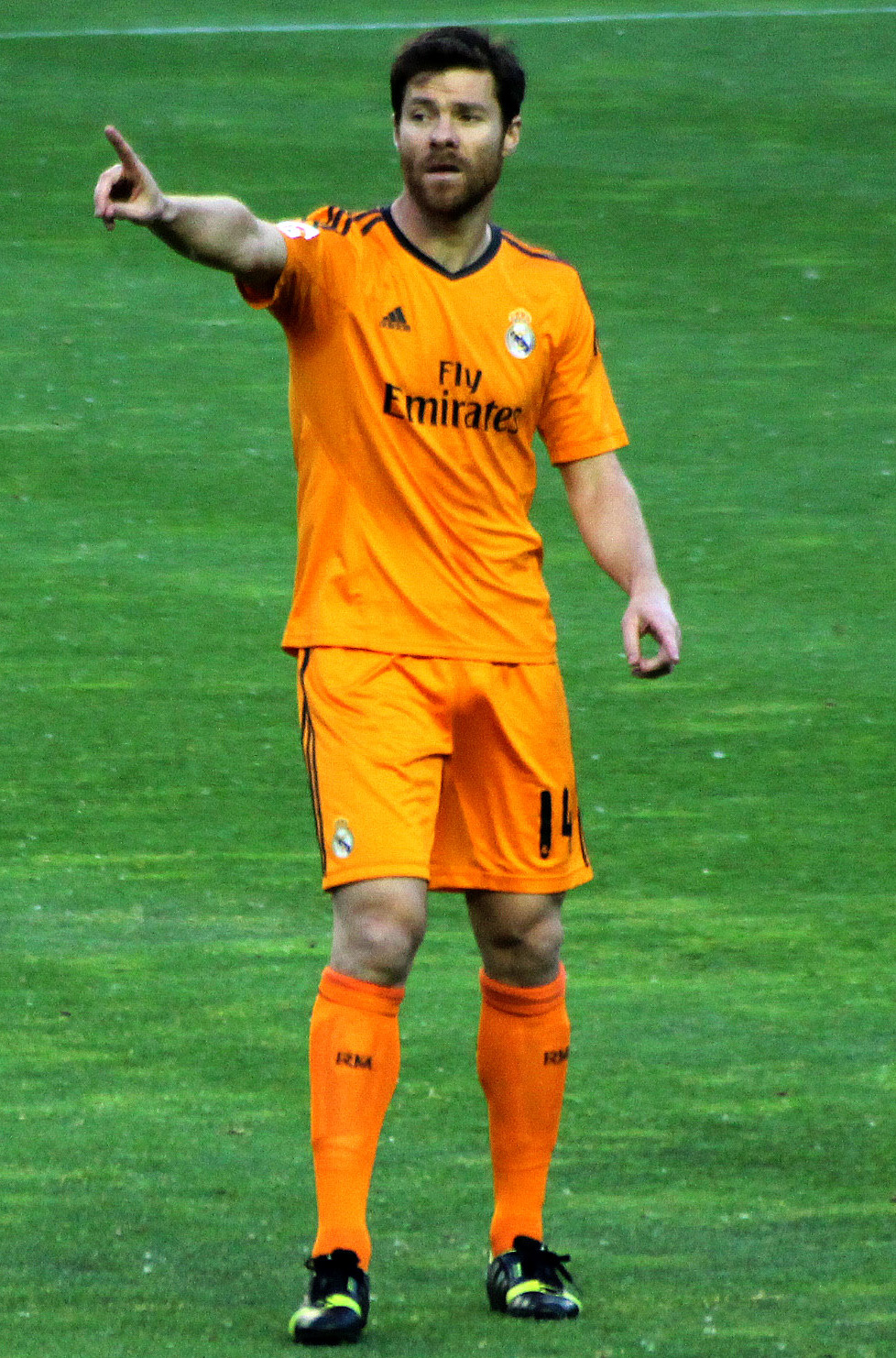
Xabi Alonso in 2014

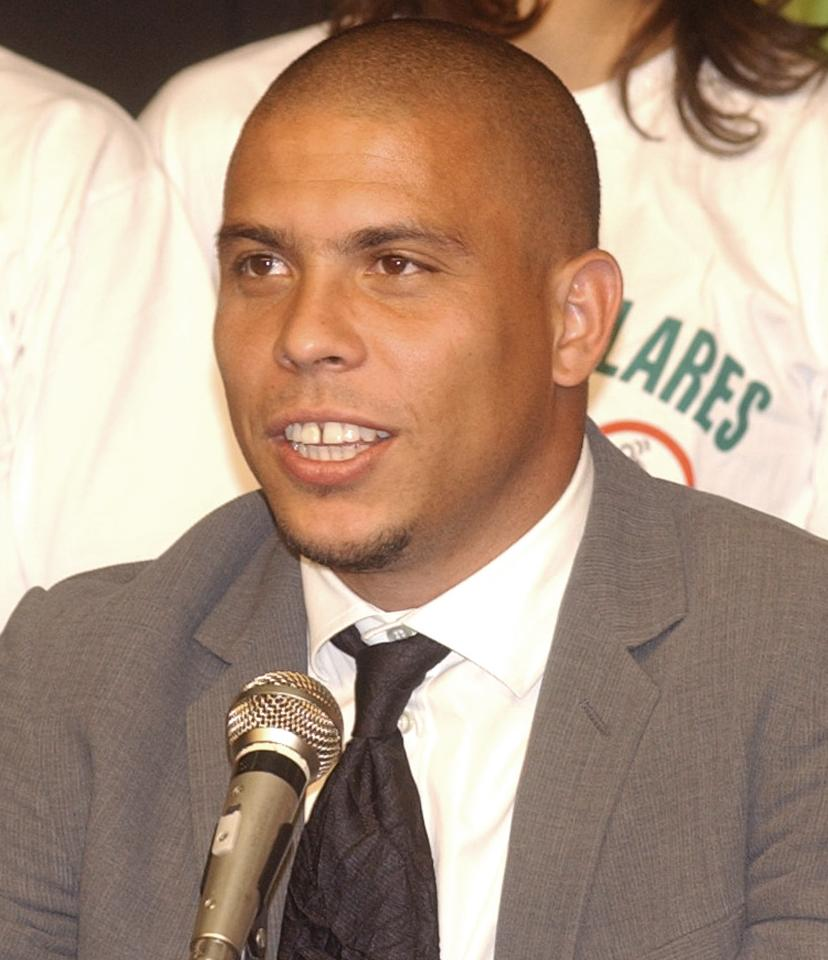
Ronaldo in 2005

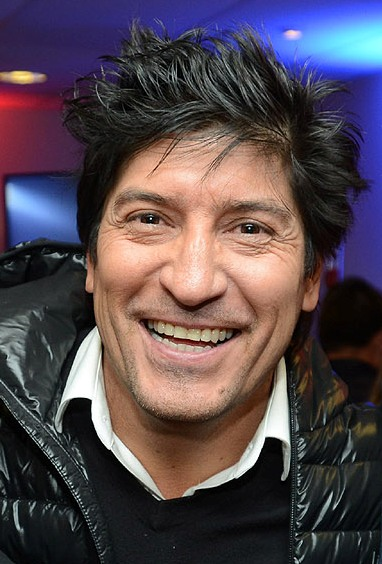
Iván Zamorano in 2013

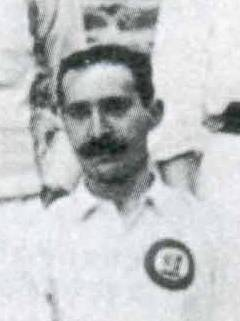
Federico Revuelto in 1905

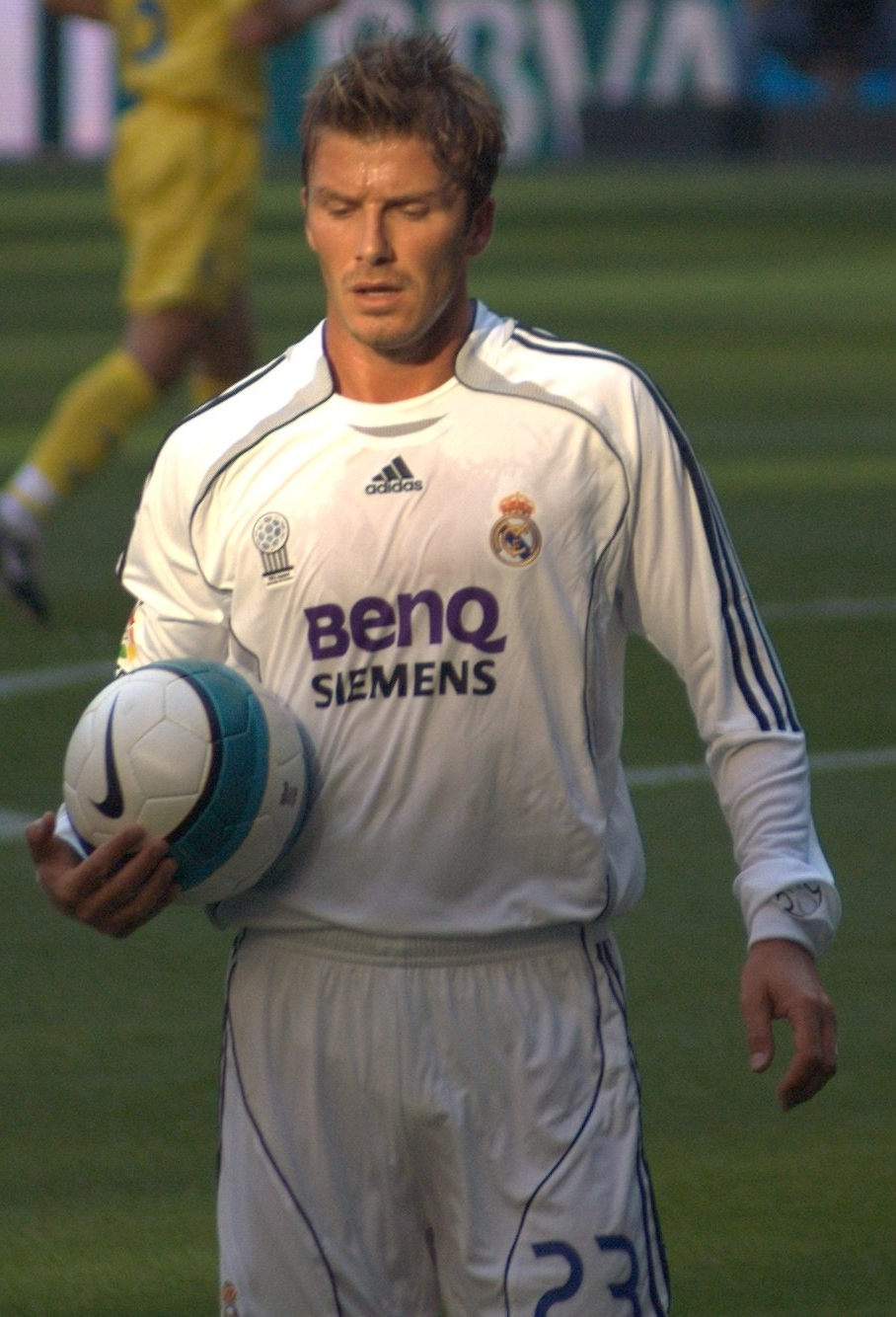
David Beckham in 2007

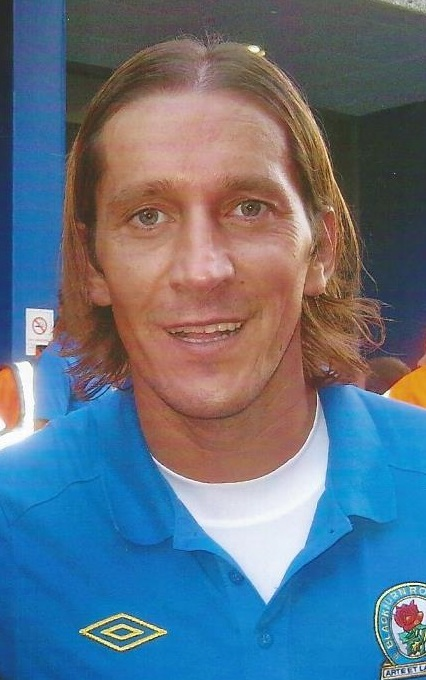
Míchel Salgado in 2011

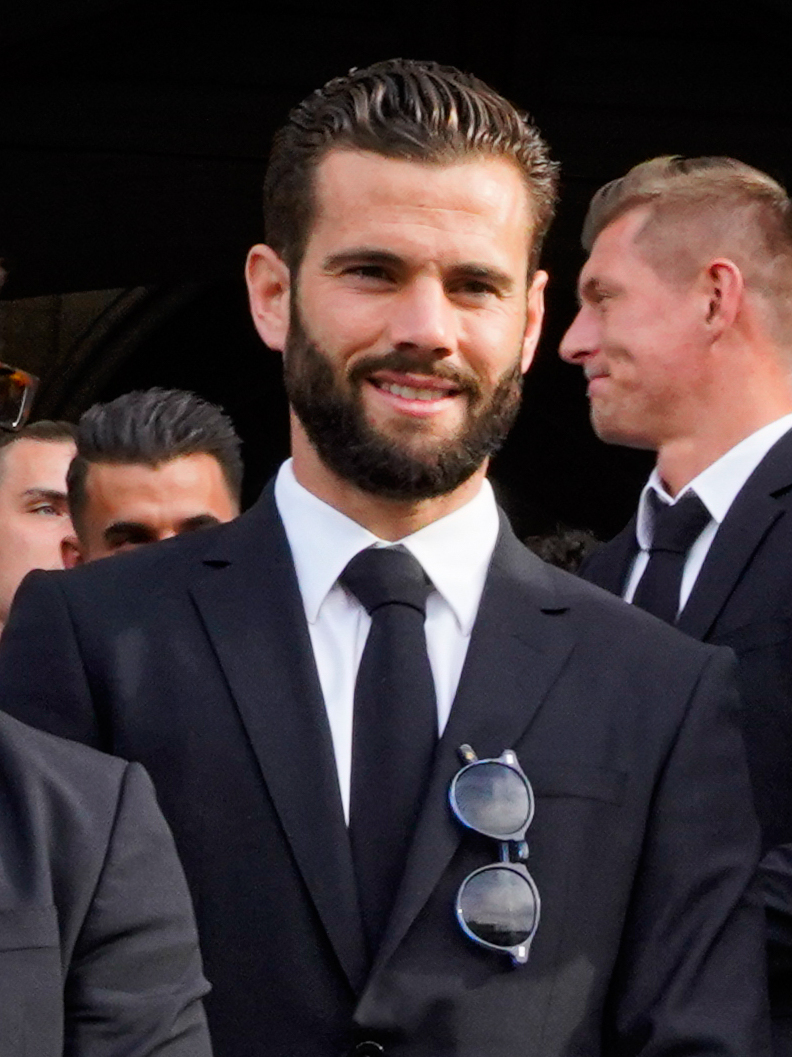
Nacho in 2022

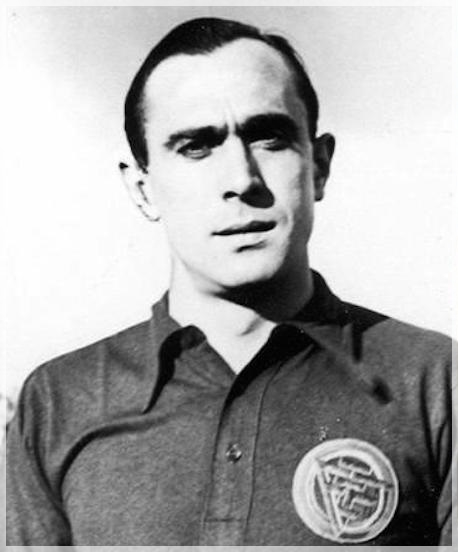
Luis Regueiro

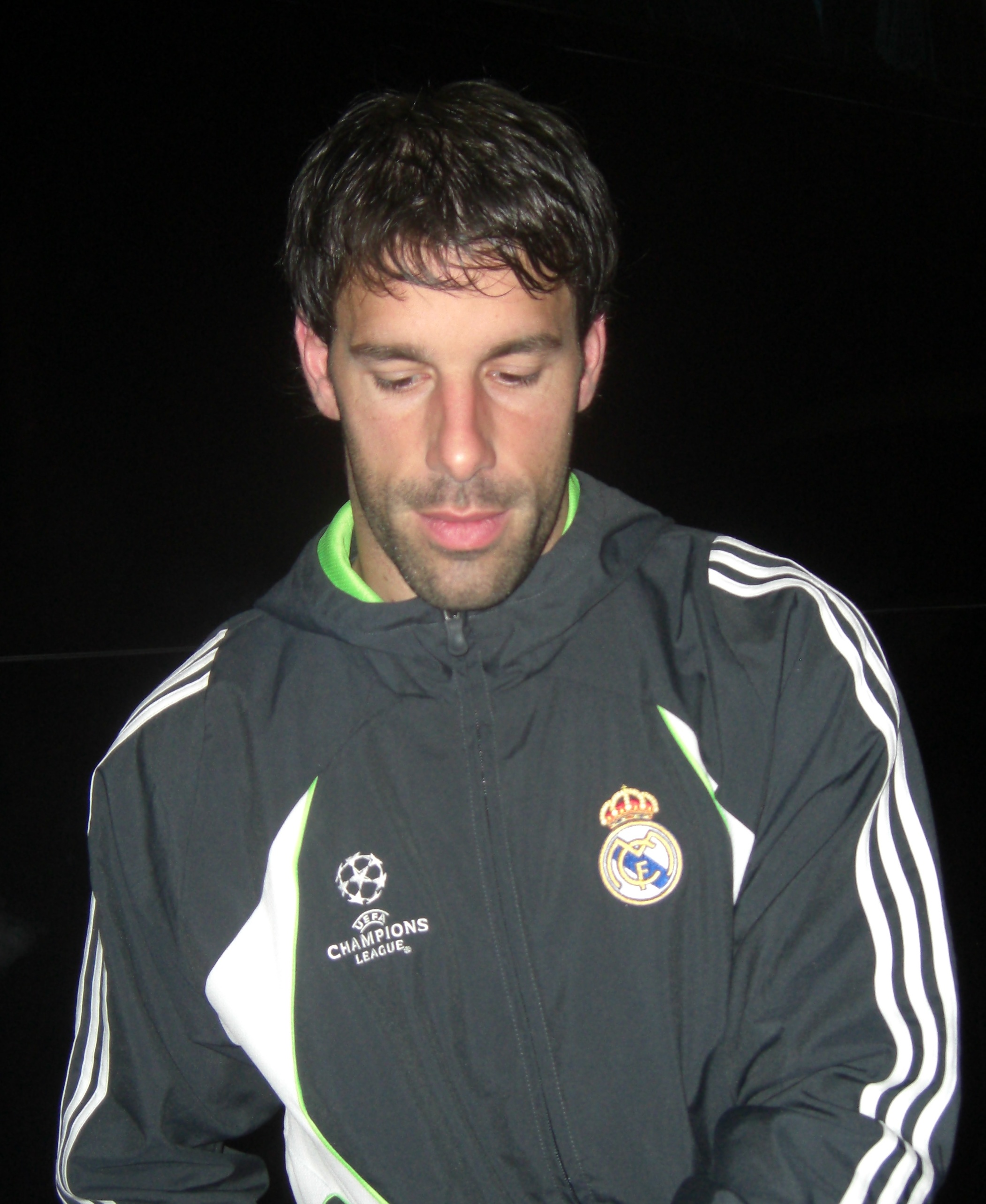
Ruud van Nistelrooy in 2007

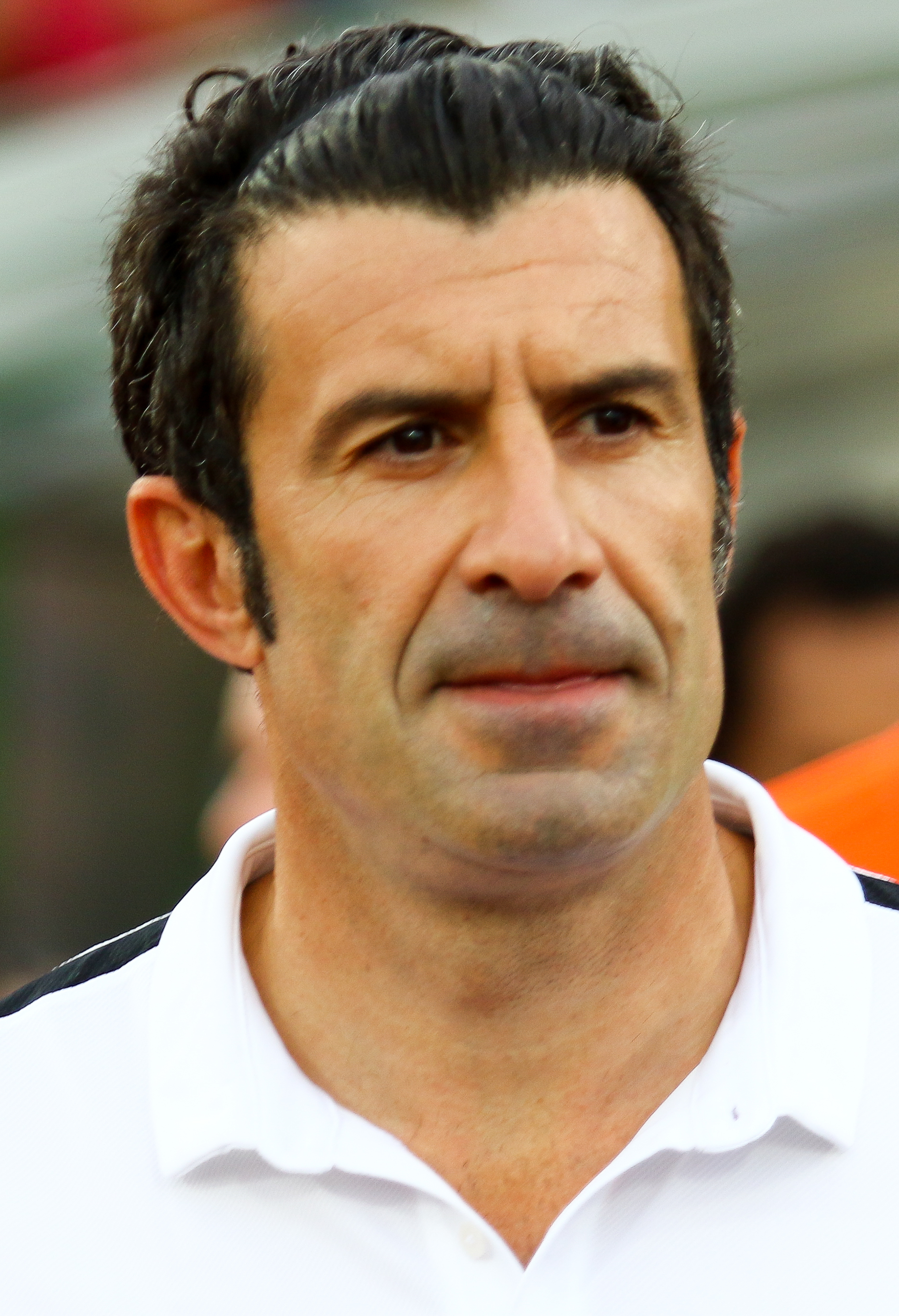
Luís Figo in 2017

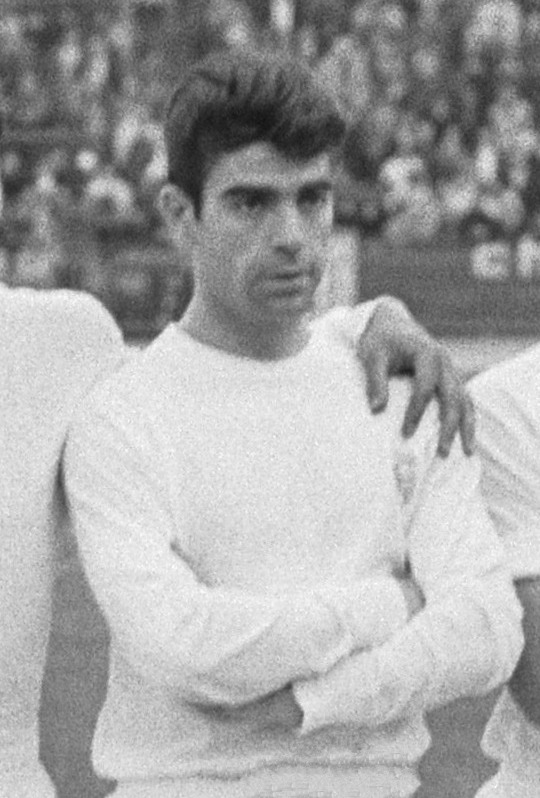
Manuel Sanchís in 1966

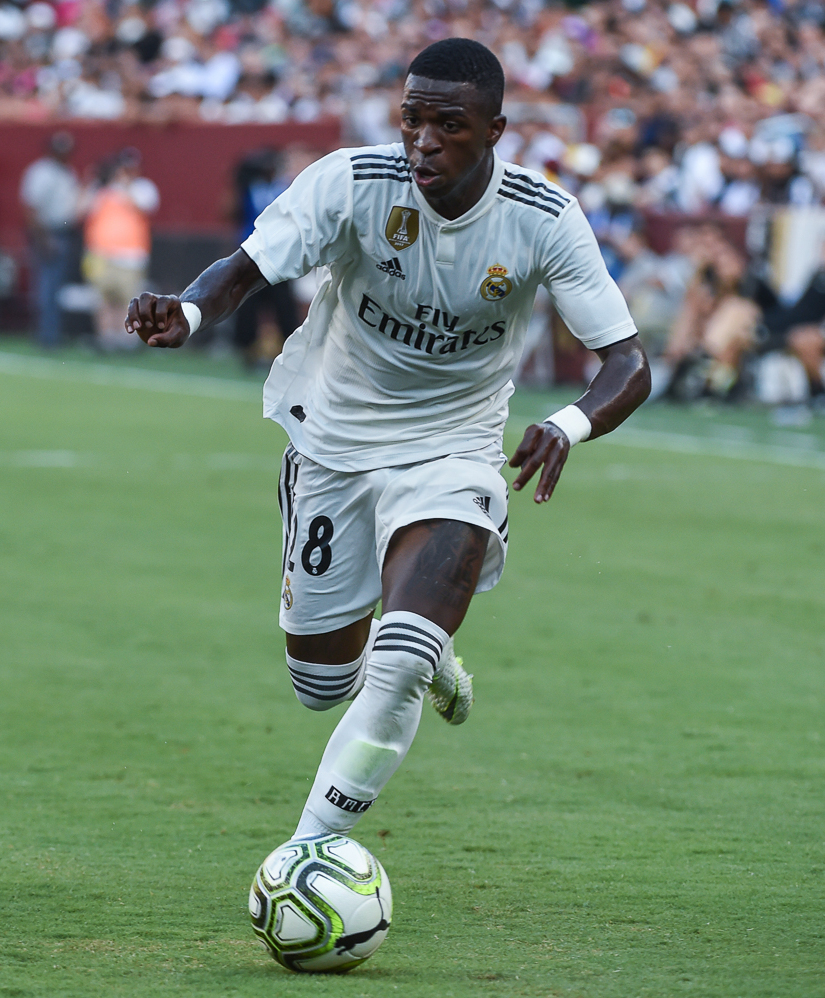
Vinícius Júnior in 2018

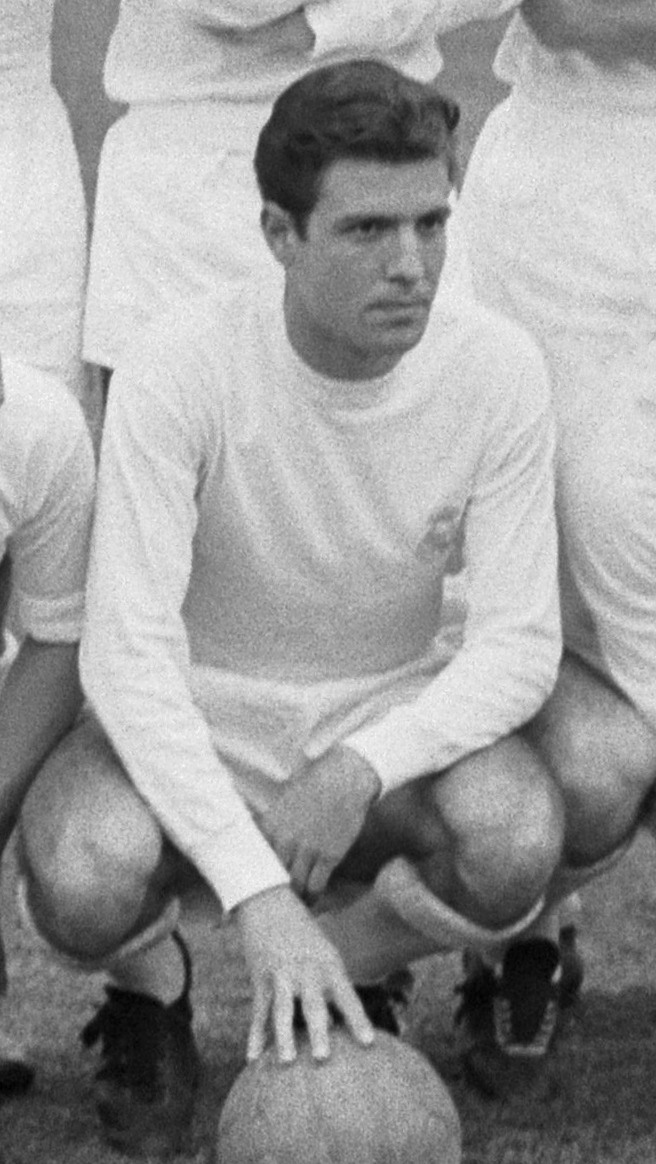
Ramón Grosso in 1966

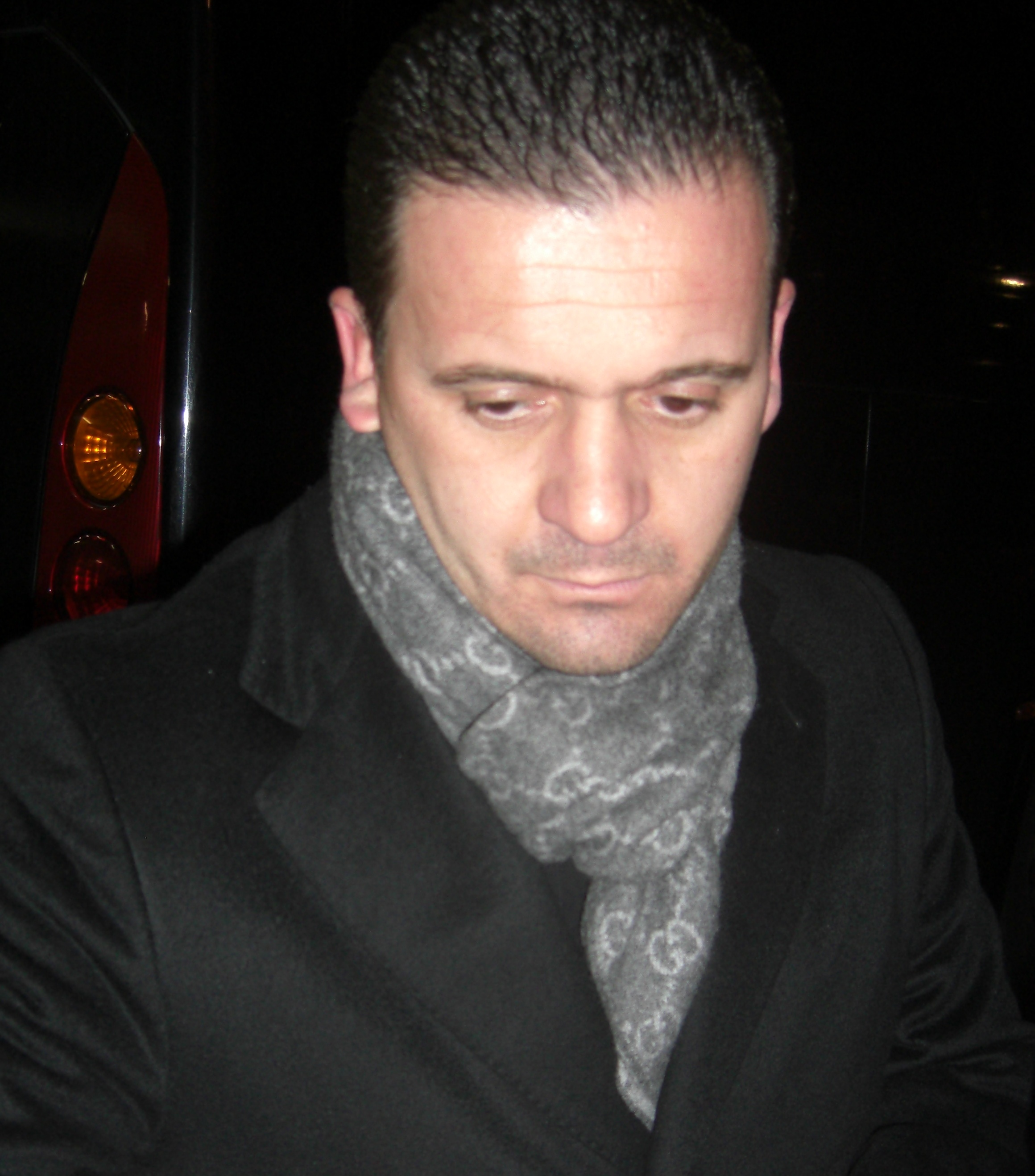
Predrag Mijatović in 2007

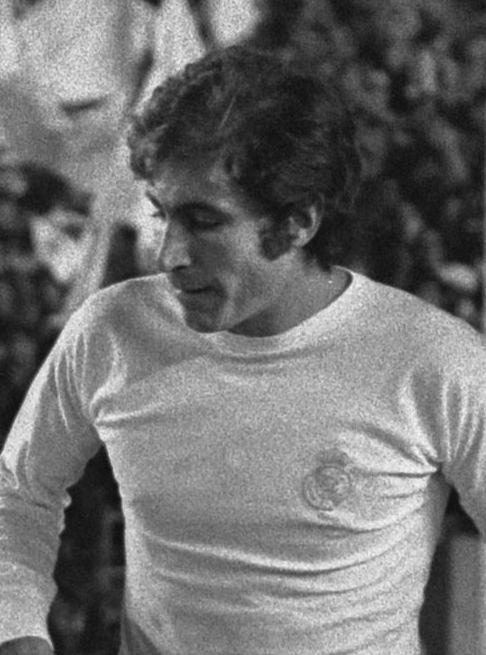
Toni Grande in 1973

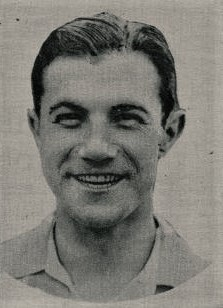
Jacinto Quincoces in 1929

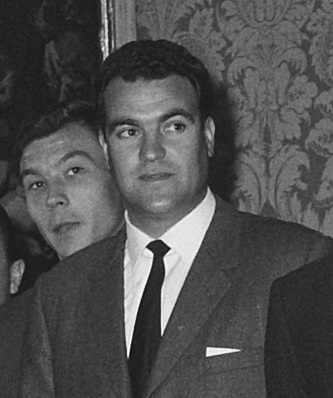
Antonio Betancort in 1965

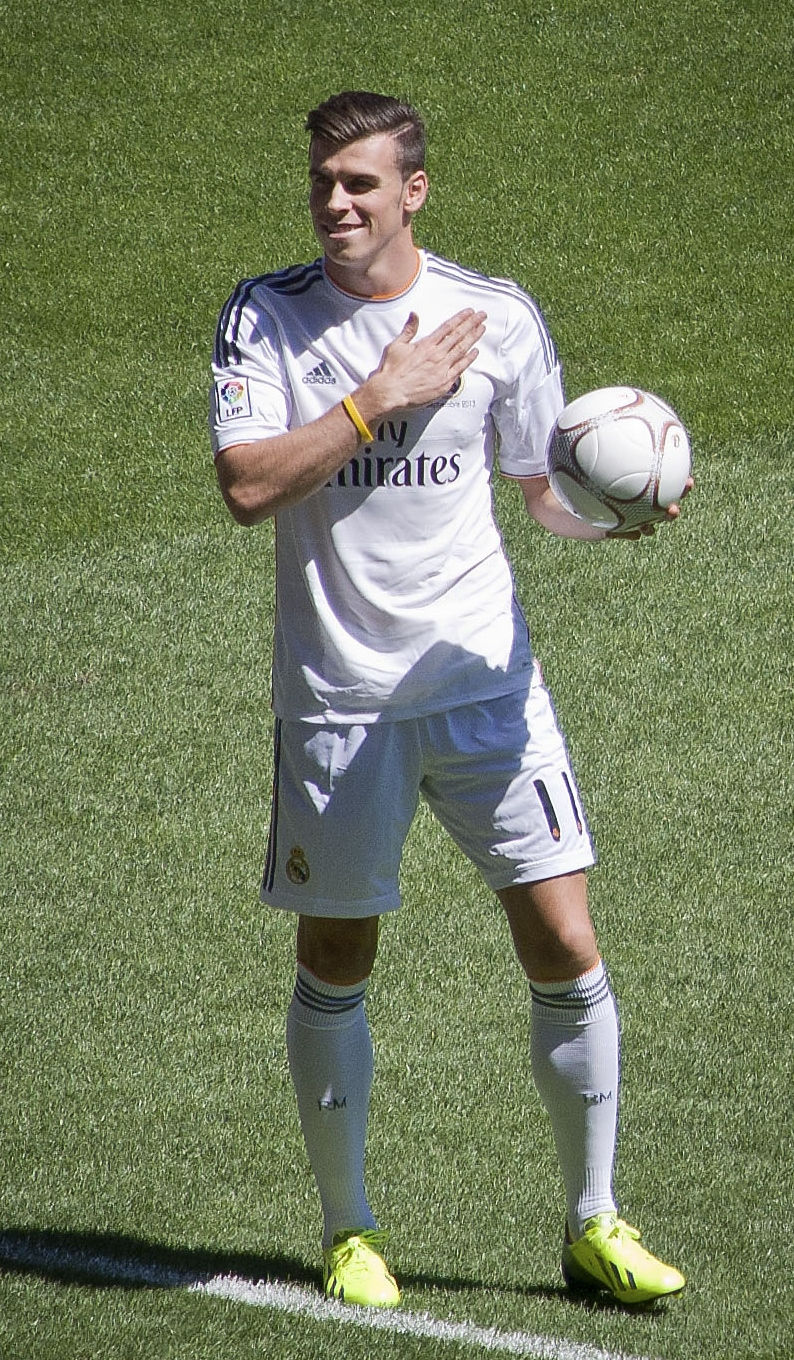
Gareth Bale in 2013

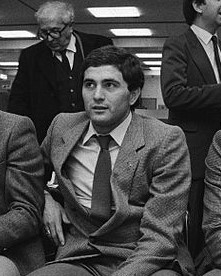
Rafael Gordillo in 1983

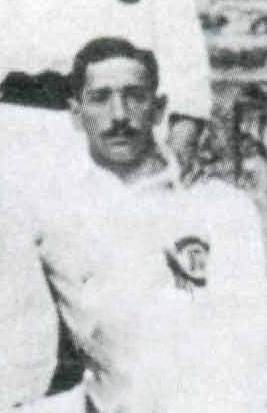
Armando Giralt in 1905

Player	P	Career	Captaincy	M	G	A	Notes
(Spain) Raúl	FW	1994–2010	2003–2010^{©}	741	323	115	^{[Pichichi]}^{[L]}
(Spain) Iker Casillas	GK	1999–2015	2010–2015^{©}	725	0	0	^{[Zamora]}
(Spain) Manolo Sanchís	DF	1983–2001¤	1993–2001^{©}	710	41	23	
(Spain) Sergio Ramos	DF	2005–2021	2015–2021^{©}	671	101	39	^{[N]}
(France) Karim Benzema	FW	2009–2023	2022–2023^{©}	648	354	148	^{[d'Or]}^{[Pichichi]}^{[UEFA]}^{[Q]}
(Spain) Santillana	FW	1971–1988	1986–1988^{©}	645	290	86	^{[G]}^{[H]}
(Spain) Fernando Hierro	DF	1989–2003	2001–2003^{©}	602	128	36	
(Spain) Paco Gento †	FW	1953–1971	1962–1971^{©}	600	183	166	
(Croatia) Luka Modrić	MF	2012–2025	2024–2025^{©}	597	43	90	^{[d'Or]}^{[FIFA]}^{[UEFA]}^{[O]}
(Spain) Camacho	DF	1973–1989	1988–1989^{©}	577	11	34	^{[Manager]}
(Spain) Pirri	MF	1964–1980	1976–1980^{©}	561	171	39	
(Spain) Míchel	MF	1981–1996	—	561	130	201	^{[K]}
(Brazil) Marcelo	DF	2006–2022	2021–2022^{©}	546	38	92	
(Spain) Guti	MF	1995–2010	—	542	77	91	
(Brazil) Roberto Carlos	DF	1996–2007	—	527	69	102	
(Spain) Chendo	DF	1981–1998¤	1989–1993^{©}	498	3	14	
(Spain) Amancio †	FW	1962–1976	1974–1976^{©}	471	154	120	^{[Pichichi]}^{[Manager]}
(Germany) Toni Kroos	MF	2014–2024	—	465	28	93	
(Spain) Emilio Butragueño	FW	1983–1995	—	463	170	109	^{[Pichichi]}
(Spain) Francisco Buyo	GK	1986–1997	—	456	0	1	^{[Zamora]}
(Spain) Dani Carvajal	DF	2013–2026	2025–2026^{©}	451	14	59	
(Portugal) Cristiano Ronaldo	FW	2009–2018	—	438	450	119	^{[Pichichi]}^{[Golden Shoe]}^{[d'Or]}^{[UEFA]}^{[FIFA]}^{[P]}
(Spain) Ignacio Zoco †	DF	1962–1974	1971–1974^{©}	434	17	13	
(Spain) Goyo Benito †	DF	1969–1982	—	420	3	0	
(Spain) Manuel Velázquez †	MF	1965–1977	—	402	59	48	
(Spain) Lucas Vázquez	DF	2015–2025	—	402	38	59	
(Spain) Juanito †	FW	1977–1987	—	401	122	123	^{[Pichichi]}
(Argentina) Alfredo Di Stéfano †	FW	1953–1964	—	396	308	137	^{[d'Or]}^{[Pichichi]}^{[E]}^{[Manager]}
(Uruguay) **Federico Valverde**	MF	2018–	—	388	44	45	
(Brazil) **Vinícius Júnior**	FW	2018–	—	387	129	88	^{[FIFA]}
(Spain) Ricardo Gallego	MF	1980–1989	—	372	28	29	
(Spain) Míchel Salgado	DF	1999–2009	—	371	5	20	
(Spain) Ramón Grosso †	FW	1963–1976	—	366	75	37	
(Spain) Nacho	DF	2010–2024	2023–2024^{©}	364	16	10	
(France) Raphaël Varane	DF	2011–2021	—	360	17	7	
(Spain) Isco	MF	2013–2022	—	353	53	54	
(Belgium) **Thibaut Courtois**	GK	2018–	—	349	0	2	^{[Zamora]}
(Spain) Miguel Ángel †	GK	1968–1986	1980–1986^{©}	346	0	0	^{[Zamora]}
(Spain) Iván Helguera	DF	1999–2007	—	346	33	12	
(Spain) Martín Vázquez	MF	1983–1990; 1992–1995	—	343	47	48	
(Spain) Vicente del Bosque	MF	1973–1984	—	340	25	38	^{[Manager]}
(Uruguay) José Santamaría †	DF	1957–1966	—	337	2	3	
(Brazil) Casemiro	MF	2012–2023	—	336	31	24	
(Portugal) Pepe	DF	2007–2017	—	334	15	16	
(West Germany) Uli Stielike	MF	1977–1985	—	308	50	38	
(Spain) José María Zárraga †	MF	1951–1962	1960–1962^{©}	303	7	22	
(Brazil) **Rodrygo**	FW	2019–	—	297	71	51	
(Spain) Juan Alonso †	GK	1949–1960	1958–1960^{©}	296	0	1	^{[Zamora]}
(Spain) Juan Antonio Ipiña †	MF	1939–1949	1944–1949^{©}	293	10	12	^{[Manager]}
(Spain) Marco Asensio	MF	2016–2023	—	286	61	29	
(Mexico) Hugo Sánchez	FW	1985–1992	—	282	208	53	^{[Pichichi]}^{[Golden Shoe]}^{[I]}
(Spain) Miguel Muñoz †	MF	1948–1958	1956–1958^{©}	275	24	37	^{[Manager]}
(Spain) Fernando Morientes	FW	1997–2005	—	272	100	25	
(Spain) Isidoro	DF	1973–1986	—	271	7	13	
(Argentina) Gonzalo Higuaín	FW	2006–2013	—	264	121	47	
(Hungary) Ferenc Puskás †	FW	1958–1966	—	262	242	133	^{[Pichichi]}^{[F]}^{[G]}
(Wales) Gareth Bale	FW	2013–2022	—	258	106	58	
(Spain) Rafael Gordillo	DF	1985–1992	—	254	27	40	
(Portugal) Luís Figo	MF	2000–2005	—	245	58	84	^{[d'Or]}^{[FIFA]}^{[M]}
(Spain) Álvaro Arbeloa	DF	2004–2006; 2009–2016	—	238	6	10	^{[Manager]}
(Spain) Ángel de los Santos	MF	1979–1985	—	237	13	23	
(France) **Eduardo Camavinga**	MF	2021–	—	237	6	11	
(Spain) Xabi Alonso	MF	2009–2015	—	236	6	31	^{[Manager]}
(Spain) García Remón	GK	1971–1986	—	231	0	0	^{[Zamora]}^{[Manager]}
(Argentina) Fernando Redondo	MF	1994–2000	—	228	5	16	^{[UEFA]}
(Spain) Marquitos †	DF	1954–1962	—	227	3		
(France) Zinedine Zidane	MF	2001–2006	—	227	49	58	^{[FIFA]}^{[UEFA]}^{[Manager]}
(Spain) Isidro Díaz	FW	1977–1985	—	223	26	13	
(Spain) Rafael Lesmes †	DF	1952–1960	—	221	1	6	
(Spain) Joaquín Navarro †	DF	1949–1957	—	219	3	0	
(Spain) Pachín †	DF	1959–1968	—	218	2	4	
(Spain) Luis Milla	MF	1990–1997	—	217	4		
(Spain) Dani Ceballos	MF	2017–2026	—	215	7	16	
(Spain) Manuel Sanchís †	DF	1964–1971	—	213	1	6	
(Spain) Luis Enrique	FW	1991–1996	—	213	18	15	
(France) **Ferland Mendy**	DF	2019–	—	210	6	9	
(Argentina) Santiago Solari	FW	2000–2005	—	209	22	17	^{[Manager]}
(Spain) Luis Molowny †	FW	1946–1957	1952–1956^{©}	208	104	86	^{[Manager]}
(France) **Aurélien Tchouaméni**	MF	2022–	—	205	7	9	
(Brazil) **Éder Militão**	DF	2019–	—	196	14	5	
(Argentina) Roberto Martínez	FW	1974–1980	—	192	61	14	
(Spain) Francisco Aguilar †	FW	1971–1979	—	190	50	33	
(Argentina) Ángel Di María	MF	2010–2015	—	190	36	67	
(Germany) **Antonio Rüdiger**	DF	2022–	—	188	10	2	
(Spain) José Luis	DF	1963–1964; 1967–1976	—	183	16	15	
(Spain) Sabino Barinaga †	FW	1939–1951	1949–1950^{©}	182	92	19	
(Spain) Félix Huete †	MF	1941–1948	—	180	1	6	
(Spain) Mikel Lasa	DF	1991–1997	—	179	5	7	
(Spain) Joseíto †	FW	1951–1959	—	178	77	37	
(Spain) Antonio Alsúa †	MF	1940–1948	—	177	42	60	
(Spain) Antonio Betancort †	GK	1961–1971	—	177	0	0	^{[Zamora]}
(Spain) Jesús Solana	DF	1985–1991	—	177	3		
(Brazil) Ronaldo	FW	2002–2007	—	177	104	25	^{[d'Or]}^{[Pichichi]}^{[FIFA]}
(Chile) Iván Zamorano	FW	1992–1996	—	174	101	20	^{[Pichichi]}^{[J]}
(Morocco) **Brahim Díaz**	MF	2018–2020; 2023–	—	172	22	27	
(Spain) Pedro de Felipe †	DF	1964–1972	—	170	0	0	
(Spain) Jacinto Quincoces †	DF	1931–1942	—	169	1	2	^{[Manager]}
(Argentina) Héctor Rial †	FW	1954–1961	—	169	83	73	
(Spain) Francisco Pavón	DF	2000–2007	—	167	3	1	
(Costa Rica) Keylor Navas	GK	2014–2019	—	162	0	0	
(Germany) Sami Khedira	MF	2010–2015	—	161	9	13	
(Spain) Paco Llorente	MF	1987–1994	—	160	9	20	
(Brazil) Sávio	MF	1997–2002	—	160	30	28	
(Spain) José Bañón †	GK	1943–1950	—	159	0	0	^{[Zamora]}
(Netherlands) Clarence Seedorf	MF	1996–2000	—	159	20	34	
(England) David Beckham	MF	2003–2007	—	159	20	51	
(Germany) Mesut Özil	MF	2010–2014	—	159	27	73	
(England) Steve McManaman	MF	1999–2003	—	158	14	20	
(Spain) Chus Alonso †	FW	1939–1948	—	157	66	35	^{[D]}
(England) **Jude Bellingham**	MF	2023–	—	157	52	35	
(Spain) Pepe Corona †	DF	1942–1948	—	154	9	0	
(Spain) Aitor Karanka	DF	1997–2002	—	149	0	2	
(Spain) Leoncito †	DF	1930–1942	1939–1942^{©}	148	8	6	
(Spain) Vicente Miera	DF	1961–1969	—	147	1	1	
(Spain) Félix Quesada †	DF	1922–1936¤	1928–1935^{©}	146	12	2	
(Spain) Miguel Tendillo	DF	1987–1993	—	146	13		
(Spain) Francisco Pineda	FW	1980–1985	—	145	43		
(France) Claude Makélélé	MF	2000–2004	—	145	2	7	
(Spain) Clemente Fernández †	DF	1941–1953	1950–1952^{©}	144	1	0	
(Spain) Félix Ruiz †	MF	1961–1969	—	144	44	23	
(Spain) José Amavisca	MF	1994–1998	—	144	14	22	
(Spain) Pahiño †	FW	1948–1953	—	143	125	32	^{[Pichichi]}
(Spain) Juan Sol †	DF	1975–1979	—	141	0	4	
(Spain) José Antonio Salguero	DF	1981–1987	—	138	9		
(Brazil) Robinho	FW	2005–2009	—	137	35	23	
(Spain) Rafael Alkorta	DF	1993–1997	—	135	3	2	
(Argentina) Juan Carlos Touriño †	DF	1970–1976	—	134	0	4	
(Spain) Raúl Bravo	DF	2001–2007	—	133	4	5	
(Austria) David Alaba	DF	2021–2026	—	131	5	9	
(Spain) García Hernández	MF	1978–1983	—	128	37	13	
(Turkey) **Arda Güler**	MF	2023–	—	127	22	30	
(Spain) Joaquín Oliva †	DF	1950–1957	—	125	0		
(Mali) Mahamadou Diarra	MF	2006–2011	—	125	4	4	
(Colombia) James Rodríguez	MF	2014–2020	—	125	37	39	
(Mexico) José Ramón Sauto †	MF	1933–1944	1942–1944^{©}	124	0	7	
(Argentina) Roque Olsen †	MF	1950–1957	—	123	66	22	
(Spain) Pedro Casado †	DF	1956–1966	—	123	1		
(Spain) Agustín	GK	1980–1990	—	123	0	0	^{[Zamora]}
(Spain) Luis Regueiro †	FW	1931–1936	—	121	64	46	
(Spain) Antonio Calpe †	DF	1965–1971	—	121	2	4	
(Spain) Toni Grande	FW	1968–1973	—	121	14	6	
(Argentina) Fernando Gago	MF	2006–2011	—	121	1	12	
(Spain) Manolín Bueno †	FW	1959–1961	—	120	26	22	
(Argentina) Jorge Valdano	FW	1984–1987	—	120	56	17	^{[Manager]}
(Brazil) Kaká	MF	2009–2013	—	120	29	31	
(France) **Kylian Mbappé**	FW	2024–	—	120	103	15	^{[Pichichi]}^{[Golden Shoe]}
(Spain) Alfonso Pérez	FW	1990–1995	—	119	22		
(Germany) Bodo Illgner	GK	1996–2001	—	119	0	0	
(Spain) Francisco Villarroya	DF	1990–1994	—	118	3	14	
(Serbia and Montenegro) Predrag Mijatović	FW	1996–1999	—	118	36	28	
(Italy) Fabio Cannavaro	DF	2006–2009	—	118	1	0	^{[d'Or]}^{[FIFA]}
(Spain) Raúl Albiol	DF	2009–2013	—	118	2	1	
(Spain) Andrés Sabido	DF	1977–1982	—	117	3	2	
(France) Lassana Diarra	MF	2008–2013	—	117	1	8	
(Spain) Pruden †	FW	1943–1948	—	116	90	23	
(Spain) Jaime Lazcano †	FW	1928–1935	—	115	59	44	^{[B]}
(Spain) Juan Santisteban	MF	1956–1964	—	115	4		
(Spain) Ricardo Zamora †	GK	1930–1936	—	112	0	0	^{[Zamora]}^{[C]}
(Spain) Fernando Zunzunegui †	DF	1966–1972	—	112	5	1	
(Croatia) Davor Šuker	FW	1996–1999	—	109	49	11	
(Croatia) Mateo Kovačić	MF	2015–2018	—	109	3	8	
(Spain) Fran García	DF	2018–2019; 2023–2026	—	109	3	13	
(Spain) Pablo Olmedo †	MF	1948–1953	—	108	32	8	
(Spain) Eugenio †	FW	1930–1936	1935–1936^{©}	107	31	34	
(Spain) Moleiro †	MF	1941–1948	—	107	9		
(Portugal) Fábio Coentrão	DF	2011–2017	—	106	1	10	
(Spain) Pedro Regueiro †	MF	1932–1936	—	104	0	2	
(France) Raymond Kopa †	MF	1956–1959	—	103	30	58	^{[d'Or]}
(Spain) Isidro Sánchez †	DF	1961–1965	—	103	1		
(Spain) Simón Lecue †	MF	1935–1942	—	102	30		
(Spain) José Mardones †	DF	1935–1943	—	102	4		
(Denmark) Henning Jensen †	FW	1976–1979	—	102	19	18	
(Spain) Albert Celades	MF	2000–2005	—	101	5	4	
(Spain) José Vicente	GK	1960–1964	—	100	0	0	^{[Zamora]}^{[C]}
(West Germany) Günter Netzer	MF	1973–1976	—	100	13	23	
(West Germany) Paul Breitner	DF	1974–1977	—	100	10	23	
(Spain) Ángel Atienza †	DF	1954–1959	—	99	0		
(Spain) Antonio Bonet †	MF	1930–1940	—	98	1		
(Spain) Benito Rubiñán	DF	1973–1977	—	98	8	13	
(Spain) Guillermo Pont †	DF	1945–1952	—	97	0	6	
(Spain) José Araquistáin †	GK	1961–1968	—	97	0	0	^{[Zamora]}
(Spain) Adolfo Aldana	MF	1987–1992	—	97	17		
(Spain) José María Peña †	MF	1926–1932	—	96	3	5	
(Spain) Luis del Sol †	MF	1959–1962	—	96	32	20	
(Italy) Christian Panucci	DF	1996–1999	—	96	6	6	
(Netherlands) Ruud van Nistelrooy	FW	2006–2010	—	96	64	17	^{[Pichichi]}
(Spain) Esteban Granero	MF	2009–2012	—	96	5	10	
(Spain) Iván Campo	DF	1998–2002	—	95	1	1	
(Spain) Álvaro Morata	FW	2011–2017	—	95	31	11	
(Spain) Enrique Mateos †	FW	1953–1961	—	94	50	25	
(Spain) Juan Verdugo	DF	1971–1975	—	94	1	7	
(Spain) Jesé	FW	2011–2016	—	94	18	14	
(Spain) Manuel Alday †	FW	1939–1944	—	93	81	11	
(Spain) Nazario Belmar †	MF	1941–1947	—	92	27		
(France) Lucien Muller †	MF	1962–1965	—	92	3	8	
(Spain) Antonio Ruiz	MF	1956–1962	—	91	3		
(Argentina) Enrique Wolff	DF	1977–1979	—	90	6	10	
(Spain) Asier Illarramendi	MF	2013–2015	—	90	3	1	
(Spain) Hilario †	MF	1931–1936	—	88	33	12	
(Spain) Alberto Vitoria †	MF	1974–1979	—	88	2	4	
(West Germany) Bernd Schuster	MF	1988–1990	—	88	16	15	^{[Manager]}
(Brazil) Ricardo Rocha	DF	1991–1993	—	88	0	0	
(Spain) Desiderio Esparza †	MF	1927–1932	—	87	3	1	
(Spain) Ciriaco Errasti †	DF	1931–1936	—	87	0	0	
(Spain) José Montalvo †	MF	1947–1953	—	87	3	8	
(Spain) José María Vidal †	MF	1959–1963	—	87	3		
(Spain) Pablo Vidal †	FW	1944–1949	—	86	19	25	
(Spain) Fernando Serena †	FW	1963–1968	—	86	15	17	
(Argentina) Rogelio Domínguez †	GK	1957–1962	—	85	0	1	
(Argentina) Carlos Guerini †	FW	1975–1979	—	85	12	13	
(Netherlands) John Metgod	DF	1982–1984	—	85	7	3	
(Romania) Gheorghe Hagi	MF	1990–1992	—	84	19	15	
(Dominican Republic) Mariano Díaz	FW	2016–2023	—	84	12	3	
(Spain) Pachuco Prats †	MF	1927–1933	—	82	1	1	
(Spain) Juan José	DF	1982–1985	—	82	0	6	
(France) Christian Karembeu	MF	1997–2000	—	82	4	3	
(Spain) Quique Sánchez Flores	DF	1994–1996	—	81	2	8	
(Spain) Pedro Munitis	FW	2000–2002	—	81	5	9	
(Spain) Rafael García Cortés	DF	1978–1983	—	80	7	2	
(Spain) Víctor Sánchez	MF	1995–1998	—	80	9	4	
(Spain) Pedro María Arsuaga †	FW	1946–1953	—	79	24		
(Spain) Jesús Narro †	MF	1948–1952	—	79	14		
(Spain) **Raúl Asencio**	DF	2024–	—	79	2	2	
(Brazil) Júlio Baptista	FW	2005–2008	—	78	13	2	
(Spain) Pascual Botella †	FW	1941–1945	—	77	13	34	
(Paraguay) Sebastián Fleitas †	FW	1969–1973	—	77	25	12	
(Portugal) Ricardo Carvalho	DF	2010–2013	—	77	3	2	
(Spain) José Callejón	FW	2011–2013	—	77	20	7	
(Socialist Federal Republic of Yugoslavia) Robert Prosinečki	MF	1991–1994	—	76	12	5	
(Denmark) Michael Laudrup	MF	1994–1996	—	76	15	20	
(Cameroon) Geremi	MF	1999–2003	—	76	2	11	
(Belgium) Eden Hazard	FW	2019–2023	—	76	7	12	
(Ukraine) **Andriy Lunin**	GK	2020–	—	75	0	1	
(Spain) Andrés Junquera †	GK	1966–1974	—	74	0	0	
(Brazil) Flávio Conceição	MF	2000–2003	—	74	2	2	
(Spain) Chus Herrera †	FW	1958–1962	—	73	23		
(Spain) Diego López	GK	2005–2007; 2012–2014	—	73	0	0	
(Spain) Miguel Cabrera †	FW	1947–1954	—	73	16		
(Netherlands) Rafael van der Vaart	MF	2008–2010	—	73	12	13	
(Spain) José María Querejeta †	DF	1942–1947	—	72	0		
(Spain) Nando	DF	1992–1996	—	72	0	4	
(Spain) Macala †	FW	1947–1951	—	70	18	25	
(Spain) Miguel Torres	DF	2006–2009	—	70	0	2	
(Spain) Paco Bonet	DF	1982–1986	—	69	0		
(Argentina) Miguel Pérez	FW	1968–1971	—	68	13	10	
(Spain) Marañón	FW	1970–1974	—	68	9	2	
(Argentina) Esteban Cambiasso	MF	2002–2004	—	67	1	6	
(England) Laurie Cunningham †	FW	1979–1982	—	66	20	10	
(Spain) Jaime	MF	1997–1999	—	66	0	1	
(Netherlands) Wesley Sneijder	MF	2007–2009	—	66	11	10	
(Netherlands) Arjen Robben	FW	2007–2009	—	65	13	13	
(Netherlands) Royston Drenthe	MF	2007–2010	—	65	4	4	
(Spain) Alfonso Fraile	DF	1981–1985	—	65	1	3	
(Spain) Juan José Maqueda	MF	1988–1993	—	64	5		
(Spain) Ito	FW	1981–1984	—	63	8		
(Argentina) Gabriel Heinze	DF	2007–2009	—	60	3	3	
(Spain) Luis Olaso †	FW	1929–1933	—	59	10	18	
(Spain) Gonzalo Marzá †	GK	1941–1944	—	59	0	0	
(Spain) Juan Azcárate †	DF	1944–1951	—	59	4		
(Spain) Gabriel Alonso †	DF	1950–1954	—	59	1		
(Spain) Ramón Marsal †	FW	1955–1962	—	59	28		
(Spain) César Sánchez	GK	2000–2005	—	59	0	0	
(Spain) Javier Portillo	FW	2001–2005	—	59	17	1	
(Spain) **Dean Huijsen**	DF	2024–	—	58	2	2	
(Spain) Antonio García	DF	1979–1982	—	57	1	2	
(Spain) Álvaro Mejía	DF	2003–2007	—	57	1	0	
(Spain) Miche †	DF	1958–1962	—	56	0		
(Spain) Francisco Uría	DF	1974–1978	—	56	2	7	
(Brazil) Danilo	DF	2015–2017	—	56	3	9	
(Spain) Gaspar Rubio †	FW	1928–1932	—	55	50	18	
(Spain) Emilín †	FW	1933–1936	—	55	19	22	
(Spain) José Macanás	FW	1972–1978	—	55	8	5	
(Spain) Sebastián Losada	FW	1984–1991	—	55	26		
(Spain) Santiago Cañizares	GK	1994–1998	—	55	0	1	
(Spain) Gerónimo del Campo †	FW	1921–1930	—	54	4	12	
(Spain) Esteban Fernández	DF	1988–1990	—	54	2	2	
(Spain) Manuel Olivares †	FW	1931–1934	—	52	43	17	^{[Pichichi]}
(Socialist Federal Republic of Yugoslavia) Milan Janković	MF	1986–1988	—	52	5	4	
(Spain) Emilio Sánchez †	FW	1939–1942	—	51	13	23	
(Spain) Justo Tejada †	FW	1961–1963	—	51	22		
(Spain) Joselu	FW	2010–2012; 2023–2024	—	51	20	3	
(Serbia) Luka Jović	FW	2019–2022	—	51	3	5	
(Spain) Gonzalo García	FW	2023–2026	—	51	13	5	
(Spain) Rafael Yunta †	MF	1944–1948	—	50	18		
(Spain) Pérez Payá †	FW	1953–1957	—	50	24		
(Spain) **Álvaro Carreras**	DF	2025–	—	50	3	3	
(Denmark) Thomas Gravesen	MF	2004–2006	—	49	1	0	
(Spain) Álvaro Odriozola	DF	2018–2023	—	49	3	10	
(Spain) Fernando Sañudo †	FW	1934–1936	—	48	50	11	
(Spain) Enrique Esquiva †	GK	1939–1943	—	48	0	0	
(Brazil) **Endrick**	FW	2024–	—	48	8	0	
(Spain) Ángel Arzanegui †	DF	1941–1946	—	47	0		
(France) Louis Hon †	DF	1950–1953	—	47	0	1	
(Spain) Felo	MF	1959–1965	—	46	4	3	
(Spain) José Ochotorena †	GK	1981–1988	—	46	0	0	
(Spain) Rafael Morera †	MF	1928–1931	—	45	16	6	
(Slovakia) Peter Dubovský †	DF	1993–1995	—	45	3	3	
(Spain) Fernando Sanz	DF	1995–1999	—	45	0	0	
(England) Michael Owen	FW	2004–2005	—	45	16	4	
(England) **Trent Alexander-Arnold**	DF	2025–	—	44	0	7	
(Spain) Rafael Vidal †	GK	1928–1933	—	43	0	0	
(Argentina) Juan Esnáider	FW	1990–1996	—	43	4	6	
(Spain) Kiko Casilla	GK	2015–2019	—	43	0	1	
(Spain) José Torregrosa †	DF	1929–1931	—	42	0	0	
(Spain) Luis Valle Benítez †	MF	1932–1936	—	42	1	2	
(Spain) Manuel Gurruchaga †	MF	1930–1935	—	41	10	6	
(Spain) José Luis Veloso †	FW	1965–1969	—	41	20	14	
(Spain) Antonio Maceda	DF	1985–1989	—	41	5	2	
(Spain) Cándido Martínez †	GK	1921–1928	—	40	0	0	
(Spain) Vicente Olivares †	DF	1940–1944	—	40	0		
(Spain) Pedro Jaro	GK	1990–1994	—	40	0	0	
(Argentina) Walter Samuel	DF	2004–2005	—	40	2	2	
(Spain) Hermenegildo Elices †	FW	1944–1948	—	39	7	17	
(Spain) Miguel Pardeza	FW	1983–1987	—	39	7	2	
(Argentina) Oscar Ruggeri	DF	1989–1990	—	39	3	0	
(Spain) Marcos Llorente	MF	2015–2019	—	39	2	0	
(Spain) Patricio Escobal †	DF	1921–1931	1924–1927^{©}	38	2		
(Spain) Borja Fernández	DF	2001–2005	—	38	0	1	
(Spain) José Antonio Reyes †	MF	2006–2007	—	38	7	4	
(Spain) Félix Pérez †	MF	1921–1928	1927–1928^{©}	37	12	3	
(Spain) Lope Peña †	MF	1926–1930	—	37	3	4	
(Spain) José Luis Borja	GK	1969–1972	—	37	0	0	
(Spain) Luis Miguel Ramis	DF	1992–1994	—	37	1	0	
(Spain) Óscar Miñambres	DF	2000–2007	—	37	0	9	
(Spain) Monchín Triana †	FW	1928–1932	—	36	15	9	
(Spain) José Becerril †	MF	1953–1958	—	36	0		
(Croatia) Robert Jarni	DF	1998–1999	—	36	3	7	
(Spain) Juan Urquizu †	DF	1927–1929	—	35	3	2	
(Spain) Luis Marín †	FW	1939–1941	—	35	6	13	
(Spain) Juan Lozano	MF	1983–1985	—	35	6		
(Ghana) Michael Essien	MF	2012–2013	—	35	2	1	
(Spain) Jesús Vallejo	DF	2017–2025	—	35	1	1	
(Argentina) Franco Mastantuono	FW	2025–2026	—	35	3	0	
(Brazil) Canário	FW	1959–1962	—	34	7	15	
(Brazil) Emerson	MF	2006–2007	—	34	1	3	
(Spain) José María Muñagorri †	FW	1919–1928	—	33	6	15	
(Spain) Miguel Ángel Portugal	MF	1979–1983	—	33	1	2	
(Spain) Julio Llorente	DF	1986–1990	—	33	3	3	
(France) Nicolas Anelka	FW	1999–2000	—	33	7	6	
(Brazil) Júlio César	DF	1999–2001	—	33	0	1	
(Mexico) Chicharito	FW	2014–2015	—	33	9	9	
(Spain) Borja Mayoral	FW	2015–2021	—	33	7	4	
(Argentina) Eduardo Anzarda	FW	1971–1973	—	32	9	4	
(Spain) Alberto Bernardo	MF	1981–1984	—	32	2	4	
(Spain) Javi García	MF	2004–2009	—	32	0	2	
(Brazil) Cicinho	DF	2005–2007	—	32	3	5	
(Spain) Antonio González †	MF	1971–1973	—	31	0	0	
(Germany) Christoph Metzelder	DF	2007–2010	—	31	0	1	
(Argentina) Javier Saviola	FW	2007–2009	—	31	5	2	
(Argentina) Ezequiel Garay	DF	2009–2011	—	31	1	3	
(Spain) Cosme Vázquez †	MF	1929–1931	—	30	8	4	
(Spain) Pepillo †	FW	1959–1962	—	30	28	11	
(Spain) Mino	DF	1986–1988	—	30	1	0	
(Argentina) Oscar Más	FW	1973–1974	—	29	11	5	
(Spain) Santiago Aragón	MF	1987–1993	—	29	2	4	
(Italy) Antonio Cassano	FW	2005–2006	—	29	4	3	
(Spain) Uribe †	FW	1926–1929	—	28	27	6	
(Spain) Santiago Bernabéu †	FW	1911–1926	1915–1921^{©}	27	19	3	^{[Manager]}^{[President]}
(Spain) Antonio de Miguel †	FW	1916–1924	—	27	3		
(Spain) Ernesto Mejía †	MF	1921–1927	—	27	2		
(Spain) Marcial Arbiza †	FW	1940–1943	—	27	29		
(Spain) Sandro	MF	1993–1996	—	27	3	0	
(Spain) Roberto Soldado	FW	2004–2008	—	27	4	0	
(Spain) Rubén de la Red	MF	2004–2009	—	27	3	2	
(Spain) Juan Monjardín †	FW	1919–1929¤	1921–1924^{©}	26	20	4	
(Spain) Eduardo Sobrado †	MF	1950–1953	—	26	9		
(Uruguay) Pablo García	MF	2005–2006	—	26	0	0	
(Spain) Adolfo Atienza †	FW	1953–1955	—	25	9		
(Spain) Juan Planelles	MF	1969–1974	—	25	6	3	
(Socialist Federal Republic of Yugoslavia) Predrag Spasić	DF	1990–1991	—	25	0	0	
(Spain) Ángel Pérez García †	DF	1978–1981	—	24	0	0	
(Spain) Álvaro Benito	MF	1995–2002	—	24	2	0	
(Hungary) Gyula Alberty †	GK	1934–1936	—	23	0	0	
(France) Théo Hernandez	DF	2017–2018	—	23	0	3	
(Spain) José Mariscal †	DF	1948–1950	—	22	0		
(Spain) Sánchez Barrios	FW	1975–1977	—	22	2	2	
(Spain) Hipólito Rincón	FW	1978–1981	—	22	6	1	
(Serbia) Perica Ognjenović	FW	1998–2001	—	22	1	3	
(Togo) Emmanuel Adebayor	FW	2010–2011	—	22	8	0	
(Spain) Sergio Reguilón	DF	2018–2019	—	22	0	3	
(Spain) Antonio Ortiz Alonso †	MF	1947–1948	—	21	0		
(France) Jean Luciano †	MF	1950–1951	—	21	1		
(Spain) Chato González †	MF	1966–1969	—	21	0	1	
(Spain) Cholo	FW	1982–1986	—	21	4	3	
(Colombia) Freddy Rincón †	MF	1995–1996	—	21	0	4	
(Brazil) Zé Roberto	MF	1996–1998	—	21	1	2	
(Argentina) Eulogio Aranguren †	MF	1915–1918	—	20	0		
(Spain) Javier Berasaluce †	GK	1955–1960	—	20	0	0	
(Czechoslovakia) Yanko Daucik †	FW	1962–1964	—	20	8	10	
(Spain) Joaquín Parra	MF	1989–1991	—	20	1	0	
(Uruguay) Carlos Diogo	DF	2005–2006	—	20	0	0	
(Netherlands) Klaas-Jan Huntelaar	FW	2008–2009	—	20	8	0	
(Spain) Kepa Arrizabalaga	GK	2023–2024	—	20	0	0	
(Brazil) Didi †	MF	1959–1960	—	19	6	6	
(Brazil) Evaristo	FW	1962–1965	—	19	5	1	
(Spain) Andrés González	DF	1972–1977	—	19	0	0	
(Spain) Miquel Soler	DF	1995–1996	—	19	1	2	
(Spain) José García Calvo	DF	1995–1997	—	19	0	0	
(Bosnia and Herzegovina) Elvir Baljić	FW	1999–2002	—	19	1	1	
(Spain) Isidro Rovira †	MF	1941–1943	—	18	1		
(Spain) Antonio Adán	GK	2010–2013	—	18	0	0	
(Spain) José Cabo †	GK	1928–1929	—	17	0	0	
(Spain) Francisco López †	FW	1928–1930	—	17	2	1	
(Spain) Manuel Pazos †	GK	1953–1954	—	17	0	1	
(Spain) Heliodoro Castaño †	FW	1954–1956	—	17	6	3	
(Spain) Juan Antonio Carcelén	MF	1981–1984	—	17	0	0	
(Spain) Dani García	FW	1993–1998	—	17	2	1	
(Portugal) Carlos Secretário	DF	1996–1997	—	17	0	0	
(Morocco) Achraf Hakimi	DF	2017–2018	—	17	2	1	
(Spain) **Marc Cucurella**	DF	2026–	—	17	0	1	
(Ivory Coast) **Yan Diomande**	FW	2026–	—	17	4	4	^{[R]}
(Spain) Josep Samitier †	FW	1932–1934	—	16	9	2	
(Spain) Rubén González	DF	2000–2004	—	16	0	1	
(Spain) **Thiago Pitarch**	MF	2025–	—	16	0	2	
(Argentina) Sotero Aranguren †	FW	1912–1917	—	15	3	3	
(Spain) José María Castell †	MF	1912–1919	1914–1915^{©}	15	0		
(Philippines) Eduardo Teus †	GK	1913–1919	—	15	0	0	
(Spain) Francisco Moraleda †	FW	1925–1928	—	15	8	7	
(Spain) Manolín †	MF	1954–1956	—	15	1	0	
(Spain) Antonio Núñez	MF	2003–2004	—	15	1	0	
(Equatorial Guinea) Javi Balboa	MF	2005–2008	—	15	2	1	
(Spain) Sergio Canales	MF	2010–2011	—	15	0	1	
(France) Enrique Normand †	MF	1902–1908; 1909–1915	—	14	0		
(France) René Petit †	MF	1914–1917	—	14	3	2	
(Spain) Sansinenea †	FW	1916–1920	—	14	4		
(Spain) Gonzalo Galé †	FW	1929–1930	—	14	6	4	
(Spain) Pedrín †	FW	1943–1945	—	14	5	5	
(Spain) Meca	FW	1999–2001	—	14	1	2	
(Spain) Tote	FW	1999–2003	—	14	6	3	
(England) Jonathan Woodgate	DF	2004–2006	—	14	1	0	
(Spain) Pedro León	MF	2010–2011	—	14	2	1	
(Spain) Sergio Arribas	FW	2020–2023	—	14	1	0	
(France) **Ibrahima Konaté**	DF	2026–	—	14	0	0	
(Portugal) **Bernardo Silva**	MF	2026–	—	14	1	1	
(Guatemala) Federico Revuelto †	FW	1902–1912	1903–1904^{©}	13	5		
(Spain) José Erice †	DF	1915–1917	—	13	0		
(Hungary) Vilmos Kelemen †	FW	1935–1936	—	13	11	8	
(Spain) José Espinosa †	GK	1935–1941	—	13	0	0	
(Spain) Mariano Terán †	MF	1945–1947	—	13	0	1	
(Spain) José Marín Aznar †	GK	1945–1948	—	13	0	0	
(Spain) Juan Gallardo †	MF	1946–1948	—	13	10		
(Spain) Ramón Tejada	MF	1965–1966	—	13	0		
(Spain) Pascual Babiloni †	DF	1968–1970	—	13	0	0	
(Spain) Juan Morgado	DF	1973–1975	—	13	0	1	
(Spain) Pedro Parages †	FW	1902–1909	—	12	4		^{[President]}
(Spain) Ricardo Álvarez †	FW	1916–1918	—	12	4		
(Spain) San Miguel †	FW	1929–1930	—	12	1	6	
(Spain) García Puerta †	FW	1930–1931	—	12	6	1	
(Spain) Elías Paramio †	MF	1943–1947	—	12	0		
(Spain) Francisco Muñoz †	MF	1944–1945	—	12	4		
(Spain) Javier Marcet †	MF	1948–1950	—	12	2	2	
(Spain) Adauto Iglesias †	GK	1948–1953	—	12	0	0	
(Spain) Cosme †	GK	1952–1955	—	12	0	0	
(Spain) Pipi Suárez †	MF	1963–1965	—	12	3	3	
(Spain) Jesús Velasco	DF	1992–1994	—	12	0	1	
(Argentina) Albano Bizzarri	GK	1999–2000	—	12	0	0	
(Poland) Jerzy Dudek	GK	2007–2011	—	12	0	0	
(Turkey) Hamit Altıntop	MF	2011–2012	—	12	1	0	
(Spain) **Carlos Espí**	FW	2026–	—	12	4	0	
(Cuba) Armando Giralt †	FW	1900–1903; 1905–1907	—	11	7		
(Spain) Manuel Prast †	MF	1904–1908; 1912–1913	—	11	4		
(Spain) Antonio Sicilia †	MF	1915–1924	—	11	0		
(Spain) Cándido Urretavizcaya †	FW	1930–1932	—	11	1	4	
(Spain) Manuel Díaz Ateca †	MF	1931–1933	—	11	0	0	
(Spain) Alfonso Sanz †	FW	1940–1943	—	11	4	1	
(Spain) Castor Elzo †	MF	1944–1946	—	11	2		
(Spain) Rubio †	MF	1955–1958	—	11	1		
(Spain) Rafael de Diego †	FW	1967–1970	—	11	5	4	
(Spain) José Luis Morales	FW	1993–1994	—	11	4	0	
(Spain) Roberto Rojas	DF	1997–1999	—	11	0	0	
(Spain) Juanfran	DF	2003–2005	—	11	0	2	
(Norway) Martin Ødegaard	MF	2014–2021	—	11	0	0	
(Netherlands) **Denzel Dumfries**	DF	2026–	—	11	0	1	
(Spain) Paco González †	FW	1919–1926	—	10	2		
(Spain) Manuel Valderrama †	MF	1923–1924; 1930–1931	—	10	4	2	
(Spain) Guillermo Yllera †	FW	1925–1928	—	10	0	1	
(Spain) Cuca II †	FW	1942–1945	—	10	1	4	
(Argentina) Antonio Imbelloni †	FW	1950–1951	—	10	2	1	
(Spain) Emilio Soto †	DF	1948–1950	—	10	0		
(Turkey) Nuri Şahin	MF	2011–2012	—	10	1	1	
(Spain) Miguel Gutiérrez	DF	2020–2022	—	10	0	2	
(Uruguay) Álvaro Rodríguez	FW	2022–2024	—	10	1	1	
(Cuba) José Giralt †	MF	1900–1903; 1905–1907	1902–1903^{©}	9	2	1	
(Spain) Joaquín Yarza †	MF	1904–1907	—	9	0		
(Spain) Pedro Llorente †	DF	1919–1926	—	9	0		
(Spain) Rafael Lozano †	MF	1926–1929	—	9	0	0	
(Spain) Luis Villanueva †	MF	1939–1940	—	9	0		
(Spain) Manuel García †	DF	1949–1951	—	9	1		
(Spain) Pantaleón †	DF	1959–1960	—	9	0	0	
(Paraguay) Juan Agüero †	FW	1965–1966	—	9	2	1	
(Spain) Fernando Ortuño †	FW	1969–1972	—	9	1	1	
(Spain) Francisco Muñoz	DF	1987–1988	—	9	0	1	
(Spain) Alberto Rivera	MF	1994–2002	—	9	1	0	
(Argentina) Rolando Zárate	FW	1999–2000	—	9	3	0	
(Brazil) Lucas Silva	MF	2014–2015	—	9	0	0	
(France) Alphonse Areola	GK	2019–2020	—	9	0	0	
(Spain) Manuel Yarza †	MF	1905–1908	—	8	4		
(Spain) Alberto Machimbarrena †	MF	1916–1918	—	8	0		
(Spain) José Múgica †	DF	1916–1917	—	8	0		
(Spain) Pepín Menéndez †	FW	1926–1928	—	8	0	3	
(Spain) José Ramón Nebot †	GK	1929–1931	—	8	0	0	
(Spain) Francisco Diz †	FW	1934–1936	—	8	2	3	
(Spain) Alberto Marcos	DF	1993–1995	—	8	0	1	
(Spain) Antonio Gómez	MF	1995–1996	—	8	2	1	
(Spain) Javier Dorado †	DF	1998–2000	—	8	0	0	
(Argentina) Nico Paz	MF	2022–2024	—	8	1	0	
(Spain) José Berraondo †	DF	1904–1909	1905–1909^{©}	7	0	0	^{[Manager]}
(Spain) Manuel Alcalde †	GK	1904–1907	—	7	0	0	
(Spain) Manuel Posada †	FW	1916–1920; 1922–1923	—	7	4	1	
(Switzerland) Adolphe Mengotti †	MF	1919–1924	—	7	0		
(Spain) Valentín Gual †	FW	1927–1928	—	7	7	1	
(Spain) Avelino Álvarez †	MF	1933–1934	—	7	0	1	
(Spain) Ángel Tamargo †	MF	1943–1944	—	7	0	0	
(Spain) José María Castivia †	FW	1944–1945	—	7	0	4	
(Spain) Rafa Verdú †	FW	1949–1950	—	7	0	2	
(Spain) Juanito †	GK	1953–1957	—	7	0	0	
(Spain) Manuel Torres †	DF	1956–1957	—	7	0	0	
(Spain) Fermín Gutiérrez	MF	1970–1973	—	7	0	0	
(Spain) Julio Suárez	FW	1983–1984	—	7	1	1	
(Spain) Pedro Contreras	GK	1993–1999	—	7	0	0	
(Cameroon) Samuel Eto'o	FW	1999–2000	—	7	0	0	
(Russia) Denis Cheryshev	MF	2012–2016	—	7	1	1	
(Spain) Manuel Ángel	MF	2025–2026	—	7	0	0	
(Spain) César Palacios	MF	2025–2026	—	7	0	0	
(Spain) Antonio Neyra †	FW	1900–1903; 1906–1908	—	6	5		
(Spain) Juan Petit †	FW	1914–1917	—	6	3		
(Spain) Julio la Serna †	DF	1915–1917	—	6	0	0	
(Spain) Cordero †	DF	1917–1918	—	6	0	0	
(Spain) Juan Manzanedo †	DF	1917–1923	—	6	0	0	
(Spain) José María Benguria †	DF	1926–1928	—	6	7	2	
(Spain) Gilberto Cayol †	GK	1933–1935	—	6	0	0	
(Spain) Chuchi †	FW	1943–1944	—	6	1	2	
(Spain) Daniel Calleja †	GK	1947–1948	—	6	0	0	
(Spain) Mario Duran	MF	1954–1955	—	6	2	2	
(Spain) Chus Pereda †	MF	1957–1958	—	6	3	1	
(Spain) Francisco Espíldora	DF	1969–1970	—	6	0	0	
(Spain) Pepe Heredia	DF	1974–1975	—	6	0	0	
(Socialist Federal Republic of Yugoslavia) Dejan Petković	MF	1995–1997	—	6	0	0	
(Spain) José Manuel Jurado	MF	2003–2006	—	6	0	0	
(Spain) Alberto Bueno	FW	2008–2009	—	6	1	0	
(Spain) Antonio Blanco	MF	2020–2022	—	6	0	0	
(Spain) Jacobo Ramón	DF	2024–2025	—	6	1	0	
(Cuba) Mario Giralt †	FW	1900–1903	—	5	0		
(Spain) José Quirante †	MF	1906–1907	—	5	0		^{[Manager]}
(Spain) Feliciano Rey †	MF	1917–1918	—	5	0		
(Spain) Juan Pablo Barrero †	MF	1923–1924	—	5	0		
(Spain) Pedro Helguera †	MF	1925–1926	—	5	0	0	
(Spain) Antonio Castro †	GK	1927–1928	—	5	0	0	
(Spain) Emilio Blázquez †	FW	1933–1934	—	5	5	1	
(Spain) Santiago Losada †	FW	1934–1935	—	5	3	2	
(Spain) Enrique Romero †	MF	1939–1941	—	5	0	0	
(Spain) Pitus Prat †	FW	1940–1941	—	5	0	0	
(Spain) Antonio Sierra †	MF	1940–1941	—	5	0		
(Spain) Pacheco †	GK	1941–1942	—	5	0	0	
(Spain) Rafael Alsua †	MF	1943–1946	—	5	0	3	
(Spain) Fernando Berridi †	MF	1944–1945	—	5	0	0	
(Argentina) José Navarro †	DF	1947–1949	—	5	0	1	
(Spain) Toni †	MF	1949–1950	—	5	0	2	
(Spain) Alfonso Navarro †	FW	1950–1951	—	5	2	0	
(Uruguay) Sergio Rodríguez †	MF	1953–1954	—	5	0	0	
(Spain) Aurelio Campa †	DF	1953–1955	—	5	0		
(Uruguay) Héctor Ramos	MF	1958–1959	—	5	0	0	
(Spain) Jaime Blanco	FW	1965–1967	—	5	2	0	
(Spain) Francis Rodríguez	DF	1981–1982; 1985–1986	—	5	0	1	
(Spain) Alberto Toril	MF	1992–1994	—	5	0	0	
(Spain) David Aganzo	FW	1999–2000	—	5	0	0	
(Spain) Jordi López	MF	2003–2004	—	5	0	0	
(Spain) Dani Parejo	MF	2008–2009	—	5	0	0	
(Spain) Álvaro Medrán	MF	2014–2015	—	5	1	0	
(Spain) Álvaro Tejero	DF	2015–2018	—	5	0	0	
(Spain) Javi Sánchez	DF	2018–2019	—	5	1	1	
(Spain) **Jorge Cestero**	MF	2025–	—	5	0	0	
(Ireland) Arthur Johnson †	FW; GK	1901–1904	1901–1902^{©}	4	1	0	^{[A]}^{[Manager]}
(Spain) Antonio Alonso †	FW	1904–1906	—	4	3	1	
(Spain) Chefo †	DF	1912–1916	—	4	0	0	
(Spain) Luis Saura †	FW	1912–1917	—	4	1	0	
(Spain) Fernando Muguiro †	FW	1916–1918	—	4	0	0	
(Spain) Francisco Cominges †	MF	1925–1930	—	4	2	0	
(Puerto Rico) Eduardo Ordóñez †	MF	1926–1927; 1932–1933	—	4	0	0	
(Spain) Antonio Merino †	MF	1927–1928	—	4	0	0	
(Spain) José Cañavera †	MF	1928–1929	—	4	1	1	
(Spain) Tomás Bestit †	MF	1931–1933	—	4	2	0	
(Spain) López Herranz †	FW	1935–1940	—	4	2	1	
(Spain) Cholo Dindurra †	FW	1939–1941	—	4	1	0	
(Spain) Juan Medrano †	DF	1943–1944	—	4	0	0	
(Spain) Juanete †	MF	1945–1946	—	4	0	0	
(Spain) Pachicho †	FW	1947–1951	—	4	1	1	
(Spain) Sebastián García †	GK	1948–1952	—	4	0	0	
(Spain) Juan Bagur †	GK	1959–1962	—	4	0	0	
(Spain) Rafael Echarri	DF	1963–1964	—	4	0	0	
(Cape Verde) Valdo	FW	2001–2003	—	4	0	1	
(Spain) Miguel Ángel Nieto	MF	2006–2007	—	4	0	0	
(Spain) José Rodríguez	MF	2012–2014	—	4	1	0	
(Spain) Cristo González	FW	2018–2019	—	4	1	0	
(Spain) Marvin Park	FW	2020–2021	—	4	0	1	
(Spain) Mario Martín	DF	2022–2024	—	4	0	0	
(Spain) Víctor Muñoz	FW	2024–2025	—	4	0	0	
(Spain) **David Jiménez**	DF	2025–	—	4	0	0	
(Spain) Rafael Molera †	DF	1902–1903	—	3	0		
(Spain) Arturo Espinosa †	FW	1909–1916	—	3	0	0	
(Spain) Bertrán de Lis †	GK	1916–1917	—	3	0	0	
(Spain) Luis Bergareche †	MF	1929–1930	—	3	1	1	
(Spain) Pablo López Martín †	MF	1934–1935	—	3	0	3	
(Spain) Méndez-Vigo †	FW	1935–1940	—	3	0	0	
(Spain) José Tamayo †	DF	1939–1940	—	3	0	0	
(Spain) Adolfo Bracero †	FW	1940–1941	—	3	1	3	
(Spain) Francisco Cantero †	FW	1943–1944	—	3	1	2	
(Spain) Josep Canal †	MF	1945–1946	—	3	0	0	
(Uruguay) Julio César Britos †	FW	1953–1955	—	3	2	0	
(Sweden) Agne Simonsson †	FW	1960–1963	—	3	1	3	
(Spain) Antonio Gento †	FW	1961–1962	—	3	0	0	
(Belgium) Fernand Goyvaerts †	FW	1965–1967	—	3	1	0	
(Spain) Juan Ignacio Rodríguez	MF	1966–1967	—	3	0	1	
(Spain) Antonio Iznata †	FW	1967–1968	—	3	0	1	
(Spain) Antonio Vidal	MF	1968–1970	—	3	0	0	
(Spain) Adolfo Fernández	DF	1972–1974	—	3	0	0	
(Spain) Ángel Martín	DF	1983–1986	—	3	0	0	
(Spain) Albert Aguilà	FW	1987–1990	—	3	0	0	
(Brazil) Vítor	DF	1993–1994	—	3	0	0	
(Spain) Iván Pérez	FW	1995–1996	—	3	1	0	
(Spain) Manuel Tena	DF	1998–1999	—	3	0	0	
(Spain) Miguel Palanca	FW	2008–2009	—	3	0	0	
(Spain) Diego Llorente	DF	2012–2015	—	3	0	0	
(Spain) Hugo Duro	FW	2020–2021	—	3	0	0	
(Spain) Víctor Chust	DF	2020–2021	—	3	0	0	
(Dominican Republic) Peter González	FW	2021–2022	—	3	0	0	
(Spain) Lorenzo Aguado	DF	2024–2025	—	3	0	0	
(Spain) Chema Andrés	MF	2024–2025	—	3	0	0	
(Spain) **Daniel Yáñez**	MF	2024–	—	3	0	1	
(Spain) Eustaquio †	FW	1901–1903	—	2	0		
(Spain) José Gorostizaga †	DF	1901–1902	—	2	0	0	
(Spain) Juan Sevilla †	GK	1901–1902	—	2	0	0	
(Spain) Juan Spottorno †	DF	1901–1902	—	2	0	0	
(Spain) Leopoldo García Durán †	MF	1902–1909	—	2	0		
(Spain) Manuel Vallarino †	MF	1902–1903	—	2	0		
(Spain) Valdeterrazo †	FW	1902–1903	—	2	1		
(Spain) Telesforo Álvarez †	DF	1903–1905	—	2	0		
(Spain) Luciano Lizárraga †	MF	1904–1905	1904–1905^{©}	2	0		
(Spain) Eugenio Bisbal†	MF	1904–1905	—	2	0		
(Spain) Julio Chulilla †	FW	1905–1912	—	2	0		
(Spain) José Carruana †	DF	1909–1910	—	2	0	0	
(Spain) Tomás Estrada †	MF	1909–1910	—	2	0	0	
(Spain) Francisco Guzmán †	DF	1909–1910	—	2	0	0	
(Spain) José Guzmán †	MF	1909–1910	—	2	0	0	
(Spain) Luis Guzmán †	FW	1909–1910	—	2	0	0	
(England) Guillermo Linney †	MF	1909–1910	—	2	0	0	
(Spain) Manuel Losada †	DF	1909–1910	—	2	0	0	
(Spain) Joaquín Redondo †	GK	1909–1910	—	2	0	0	
(Spain) Luis Belaunde †	FW	1915–1916	—	2	3	0	
(Spain) Casanova †	FW	1915–1916	—	2	0	0	
(Spain) Manuel de Gomar †	FW	1915–1916	—	2	0	0	
(Spain) Pablo Lemmel †	GK	1915–1916	—	2	0	0	
(Spain) Joaquín Caruncho †	MF	1917–1918	—	2	0		
(Spain) Pablo Hernández †	GK	1919–1920	—	2	0	0	
(Spain) Víctor †	FW	1919–1920	—	2	0		
(Spain) Aurelio Marcos †	FW	1921–1922	—	2	0	0	
(Spain) Alfredo Eguía †	FW	1930–1931	—	2	0	0	
(Spain) Arsenio Arocha †	MF	1933–1934	—	2	0	0	
(Spain) Ramon Masagué †	FW	1939–1940	—	2	3	0	
(Cuba) Mario Inchausti †	GK	1940–1942	—	2	0	0	
(Spain) Rafael Suárez †	DF	1940–1942	—	2	0	0	
(Spain) Gregorio Tellado †	MF	1941–1942	—	2	0	0	
(Spain) José Tormo †	MF	1943–1944	—	2	0	1	
(Mexico) José Luis Borbolla †	MF	1944–1946	—	2	1	0	
(Spain) Porro †	FW	1944–1946	—	2	1	1	
(Spain) Fernando Ferrús †	GK	1946–1947	—	2	0	0	
(Spain) Francisco Espina †	FW	1952–1953	—	2	1	1	
(Spain) Juan Vázquez †	FW	1953–1954	—	2	0	0	
(Spain) Isidro Brunet †	FW	1957–1958	—	2	0	0	
(Spain) Juan Manuel Villa †	FW	1958–1961	—	2	1	0	
(Spain) Santos Bedoya †	MF	1964–1965	—	2	0	0	
(Spain) Francisco Ballester †	DF	1969–1974	—	2	0	0	
(Spain) De la Fuente †	DF	1970–1971	—	2	0	0	
(Spain) Amador Lorenzo	GK	1976–1978	—	2	0	0	
(Spain) Javier Maté	GK	1978–1979	—	2	0	0	
(Uruguay) Juan Alberto Acosta	MF	1982–1983	—	2	0	0	
(Spain) Antonio León	DF	1985–1989	—	2	0	0	
(Spain) Ismael Urzaiz	FW	1990–1993	—	2	0	0	
(Spain) Víctor Torres	DF	1990–1991	—	2	0	0	
(Spain) Irurzun	FW	1996–1997	—	2	0	0	
(Spain) Carlos Aranda	FW	1999–2002	—	2	0	0	
(Spain) Carlos Sánchez	GK	2000–2004	—	2	0	0	
(Spain) Álex Pérez	MF	2002–2005	—	2	0	0	
(Spain) Juanjo Olalla	DF	2002–2004	—	2	0	0	
(Spain) Javier Paredes	DF	2003–2005	—	2	0	0	
(Spain) Miguel Palencia	DF	2004–2005	—	2	0	0	
(Spain) Borja Valero	MF	2006–2007	—	2	0	0	
(France) Julien Faubert	MF	2008–2009	—	2	0	0	
(Spain) David Mateos	MF	2009–2011	—	2	0	0	
(Spain) Juanfran	DF	2009–2011	—	2	0	0	
(Spain) Álex Fernández	MF	2010–2013	—	2	0	0	
(Spain) Jesús Fernández	GK	2011–2014	—	2	0	0	
(Spain) Fernando Pacheco	GK	2011–2014	—	2	0	0	
(Argentina) Franchu	FW	2017–2019	—	2	0	0	
(Algeria) Luca Zidane	GK	2017–2019	—	2	0	0	
(Spain) Mario Gila	DF	2021–2022	—	2	0	0	
(Spain) **Diego Aguado**	DF	2024–	—	2	0	0	
(Spain) José Palacios †	MF	1901–1902	—	1	0	0	
(Spain) José Aspiunza †	DF	1907–1910	—	1	0	0	
(England) Federico Larraine †	GK	1907–1908	—	1	0	0	
(Uruguay) Edmundo Nóvoa †	DF	1907–1908	—	1	0	0	
(Spain) Cipriano Prada †	MF	1907–1908	—	1	0	0	
(Spain) Juan de Cárcer †	GK	1912–1916	—	1	0	0	^{[Manager]}
(Spain) Arsenio Comamala †	MF	1912–1914	—	1	0	0	
(Spain) Joaquín Rodríguez †	FW	1912–1913	—	1	0	0	
(Cuba) Martín Juantorena †	FW	1912–1913	—	1	0	0	
(Spain) Marcelo Bernabéu †	DF	1912–1913	—	1	0	0	
(Spain) Bernardo Menéndez †	DF	1912–1913	—	1	0	0	
(Spain) Olivares †	MF	1912–1913	—	1	0	0	
(Spain) Zabalo †	FW	1915–1916	—	1	1	0	
(Spain) Juan Caballero †	MF	1917–1918	—	1	0	0	
(Spain) Manuel Tapias †	MF	1919–1920	—	1	0	0	
(Spain) José Bisbal †	FW	1919–1920	—	1	0	0	
(Spain) Meñaca †	MF	1921–1922	—	1	0	0	
(Spain) Narciso Lambán †	MF	1922–1923	—	1	0	0	
(Spain) Félix Contreras †	MF	1923–1924	—	1	0	0	
(Spain) Velasco †	DF	1928–1929	—	1	0	0	
(Spain) Eugenio Moriones †	FW	1929–1930	—	1	0	0	
(Spain) Francisco Campos †	GK	1932–1936	—	1	0	0	
(Spain) Francisco Gómez †	MF	1932–1933	—	1	0	0	
(Brazil) Fernando Giudicelli †	MF	1935–1936	—	1	0	0	
(Spain) Luis Abreu †	FW	1940–1941	—	1	0	0	
(Spain) Ramón Maciá †	DF	1942–1944	—	1	0	0	
(Spain) Juan Ochoantezana †	FW	1943–1945	—	1	0	0	
(Spain) José María Gil †	MF	1943–1944	—	1	0	0	
(Spain) Pelayo Camino	GK	1943–1945	—	1	0	0	
(Spain) Camilo Roig †	FW	1944–1945	—	1	0	0	
(Spain) Francisco Sureda †	GK	1946–1947	—	1	0	0	
(Spain) Hilario Rodríguez †	GK	1947–1949	—	1	0	0	
(Argentina) Manuel Rocha	MF	1948–1947	—	1	0	0	
(Scotland) John Fox Watson †	MF	1949–1950	—	1	0	0	
(Spain) Francisco Juanco †	FW	1949–1950	—	1	0	0	
(Hungary) György Nemes †	FW	1950–1952	—	1	0	0	
(Spain) Antoni Gausí †	FW	1951–1953	—	1	0	0	
(Spain) José González †	DF	1951–1952	—	1	0	0	
(Spain) Juan Cedrés †	FW	1952–1953	—	1	0	0	
(Spain) Wilson Jones †	MF	1955–1957	—	1	0	0	
(Spain) Joaquín García	FW	1958–1959	—	1	0	0	
(Spain) Corcuera	DF	1963–1964	—	1	0	0	
(Spain) Antonio Robles †	MF	1963–1964	—	1	0	0	
(Spain) Luis Sorribas †	FW	1963–1964	—	1	0	0	
(Spain) Emilio Morollón †	FW	1964–1965	—	1	1	0	
(Spain) García-Ramos	FW	1965–1966	—	1	0	0	
(Spain) Fernando Rovira	MF	1966–1968	—	1	1	1	
(Spain) Gerardo Ortega	FW	1968–1969	—	1	1	0	
(Spain) Casimiro Torres	DF	1981–1982	—	1	0	0	
(Spain) José Espinosa †	DF	1981–1982	—	1	0	0	
(Spain) Francesc Julià	FW	1981–1982	—	1	0	0	
(Spain) Juanito	DF	1981–1982	—	1	0	0	
(Spain) López Miró	FW	1981–1982	—	1	0	0	
(Spain) Isaac Serrano	FW	1981–1982	—	1	0	0	
(Spain) Juan González	DF	1984–1985	—	1	0	0	
(Spain) Manuel Bugallo	FW	1984–1985	—	1	0	0	
(Spain) Juan Canales	GK	1984–1985	—	1	0	0	
(Spain) Sánchez Clemente	DF	1984–1985	—	1	0	0	
(Spain) Eusebio Timoneda	DF	1984–1985	—	1	0	0	
(Spain) Fernando Urdiales	MF	1984–1985	—	1	0	0	
(Spain) Bernardo Martín	MF	1984–1985	—	1	0	0	
(Spain) Geni	DF	1984–1985	—	1	0	0	
(Spain) Miguel Hurtado	FW	1984–1985	—	1	0	0	
(Spain) Leonardo Azcona	FW	1984–1985	—	1	1	0	
(Spain) Márquez	MF	1984–1985	—	1	0	0	
(Spain) José María Salmerón	FW	1984–1985	—	1	0	0	
(Spain) Juan Martos	DF	1985–1986	—	1	0	0	
(Spain) Juan Mandiá	FW	1987–1988	—	1	0	0	
(Spain) Julen Lopetegui	GK	1988–1991	—	1	0	0	^{[Manager]}
(Spain) Mikel Antía	DF	1993–1994	—	1	0	0	
(Spain) Fernando Sánchez	MF	1993–1994	—	1	0	0	
(Spain) Rubio	DF	1998–1999	—	1	0	0	
(Spain) Fernando Fernández	FW	1999–2000	—	1	0	0	
(Spain) Enrique Corrales	DF	2000–2001	—	1	0	0	
(Spain) Luis García	FW	2002–2003	—	1	0	0	
(Spain) Riki	FW	2003–2004	—	1	0	1	
(Spain) Jotha	FW	2004–2005	—	1	0	0	
(Spain) Marcos Tébar	MF	2005–2009	—	1	0	0	
(Spain) Adrián Martín	MF	2005–2006	—	1	0	0	
(Spain) Jordi Codina	GK	2007–2009	—	1	0	0	
(Uruguay) Gary Kagelmacher	DF	2008–2009	—	1	0	0	
(Spain) Marcos Alonso	DF	2009–2010	—	1	0	0	
(Spain) Pedro Mosquera	MF	2009–2010	—	1	0	0	
(Spain) Jorge Casado	DF	2010–2012	—	1	0	0	
(Spain) Tomás Mejías	GK	2010–2012	—	1	0	0	
(Spain) Juan Carlos	FW	2010–2011	—	1	0	0	
(Spain) Pablo Sarabia	FW	2010–2011	—	1	0	0	
(Portugal) Pedro Mendes	DF	2011–2012	—	1	0	0	
(Brazil) Fabinho	MF	2012–2013	—	1	0	1	
(Equatorial Guinea) Omar Mascarell	MF	2012–2014	—	1	0	0	
(Brazil) Willian José	FW	2013–2014	—	1	0	0	
(Spain) Raúl de Tomás	FW	2014–2015	—	1	0	0	
(Spain) Javier Muñoz	MF	2014–2015	—	1	0	0	
(Spain) Rubén Yáñez	GK	2015–2017	—	1	0	0	
(Austria) Philipp Lienhart	DF	2015–2016	—	1	0	0	
(France) Enzo Zidane	MF	2016–2017	—	1	1	0	
(Dominican Republic) Luismi Quezada	DF	2017–2018	—	1	0	0	
(Spain) Óscar Rodríguez	MF	2017–2018	—	1	0	0	
(Spain) Jaime Seoane	MF	2017–2018	—	1	0	0	
(Spain) Álvaro Fidalgo	MF	2018–2019	—	1	0	0	
(Spain) Juanmi Latasa	FW	2021–2022	—	1	0	0	
(Spain) Sergio Santos	DF	2021–2022	—	1	0	0	
(Brazil) Vinicius Tobias	DF	2023–2024	—	1	0	0	
(Spain) Álvaro Carrillo	DF	2023–2024	—	1	0	0	
(Spain) Fran González	GK	2024–2026	—	1	0	0	
(Spain) Víctor Valdepeñas	DF	2025–2026	—	1	0	0	
(Spain) **Daniel Mesonero**	MF	2025–	—	1	0	0	
(Spain) **Álvaro Leiva**	MF	2025–	—	1	0	0	
(Spain) **Manu Serrano**	DF	2025–	—	1	0	0	

=== Foreign players ===
- The player's **current nationality** is considered, regardless of the dissolved countries the player was associated with during their time at Real Madrid.
- As of 22 September 2026.

Foreign players by country
Country	Players
Argentina	34
Brazil	28
France	22
Uruguay	11
Germany	10
England	9
Netherlands	9
Portugal	8
Croatia	5
Cuba	5
Serbia	5
Hungary	4
Mexico	4
Belgium	3
Denmark	3
Dominican Republic	3
Italy	3
Turkey	3
Cameroon	2
Colombia	2
Equatorial Guinea	2
Morocco	2
Paraguay	2
Slovakia	2
Algeria	1
Cape Verde	1
Chile	1
Costa Rica	1
Ghana	1
Guatemala	1
Ireland	1
Ivory Coast	1
Mali	1
Montenegro	1
Norway	1
Philippines	1
Poland	1
Puerto Rico	1
Romania	1
Russia	1
Scotland	1
Sweden	1
Switzerland	1
Togo	1
Ukraine	1
Wales	1
**Total**	**203**

Foreign players by continent
Continent	Players
Europe	97
South America	78
North America and Caribbean	15
Africa	12
Asia	1
**Total**	**203**

== Team captains ==
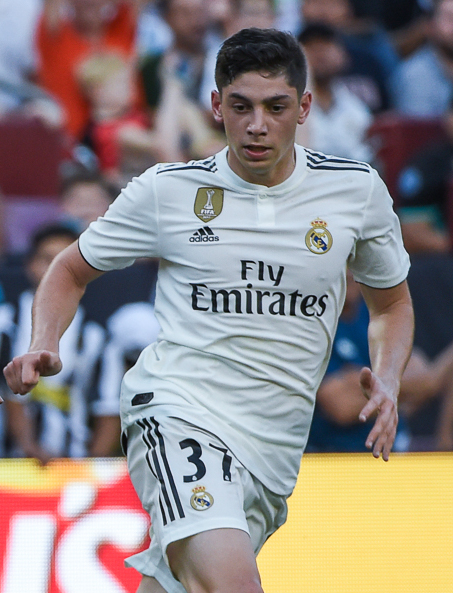
Federico Valverde, the current captain of Real Madrid

The following players have been official Real Madrid captains. Vice captains are also listed.

Player	Years	Vice Captain(s)
(Ireland) Arthur Johnson	1901–1902	
(Cuba) José Giralt	1902–1903	
(Guatemala) Federico Revuelto	1903–1904	
(Spain) Luciano Lizárraga	1904–1905	
(Spain) José Berraondo	1905–1909	
(Spain) José María Castell	1914–1915	
(Spain) Santiago Bernabéu	1915–1921	
(Spain) Juan Monjardín	1921–1924	
(Spain) Perico Escobal	1924–1927	
(Spain) Félix Pérez	1927–1928	
(Spain) Félix Quesada	1928–1935	
(Spain) Eugenio Hilario	1935–1936	
(Spain) Leoncito	1939–1942	
(Mexico) José Ramón Sauto	1942–1944	
(Spain) Juan Antonio Ipiña	1944–1949	
(Spain) Sabino Barinaga	1949–1950	
(Spain) Clemente Fernández	1950–1952	
(Spain) Luis Molowny	1952–1956	
(Spain) Miguel Muñoz	1956–1958	
(Spain) Juanito Alonso	1958–1960	
(Spain) José María Zárraga	1960–1962	
(Spain) Francisco Gento	1962–1971	
(Spain) Ignacio Zoco	1971–1974	
(Spain) Amancio	1974–1976	
(Spain) Pirri	1976–1980	
(Spain) Miguel Ángel	1980–1986	
(Spain) Santillana	1986–1988	
(Spain) José Antonio Camacho	1988–1989	
(Spain) Chendo	1989–1993	
(Spain) Manuel Sanchís	1993–2001	Fernando Hierro, Fernando Redondo, Raúl
(Spain) Fernando Hierro	2001–2003	Raúl
(Spain) Raúl	2003–2010	Guti, Míchel Salgado, Iker Casillas, Roberto Carlos, Sergio Ramos
(Spain) Iker Casillas	2010–2015	Sergio Ramos, Marcelo, Pepe, Gonzalo Higuaín, Cristiano Ronaldo
(Spain) Sergio Ramos	2015–2021	Marcelo, Cristiano Ronaldo, Karim Benzema, Raphaël Varane
(Brazil) Marcelo	2021–2022	Karim Benzema, Nacho, Luka Modrić
(France) Karim Benzema	2022–2023	Nacho, Luka Modrić, Dani Carvajal
(Spain) Nacho	2023–2024	Luka Modrić, Dani Carvajal, Toni Kroos
(Croatia) Luka Modrić	2024–2025	Dani Carvajal, Lucas Vázquez, Federico Valverde
(Spain) Dani Carvajal	2025–2026	Federico Valverde, Vinícius Júnior, Thibaut Courtois
(Uruguay) Federico Valverde	2026–	Vinícius Júnior, Thibaut Courtois, Rodrygo

== Notes ==
Awards and positions

- d'Or. ^{a} ^{b} ^{c} ^{d} ^{e} ^{f} ^{g} ^{h} Won the Ballon d'Or while at Real Madrid.
- FIFA. ^{a} ^{b} ^{c} ^{d} ^{e} ^{f} ^{g} Won the FIFA World Player of the Year/The Best FIFA Men's Player award while at Real Madrid.
- UEFA. ^{a} ^{b} ^{c} ^{d} ^{e} Won the UEFA Best Player in Europe Award/UEFA Club Footballer of the Year while at Real Madrid.
- Pichichi.^{a} ^{b} ^{c} ^{d} ^{e} ^{f} ^{g} ^{h} ^{i} ^{j} ^{k} ^{l} ^{m} ^{n} ^{o} ^{p} Won the Pichichi Trophy while at Real Madrid.
- Zamora.^{a} ^{b} ^{c} ^{d} ^{e} ^{f} ^{g} ^{h} ^{i} ^{j} ^{k} ^{l} Won the Zamora Trophy while at Real Madrid.
- Golden Shoe.^{a} ^{b} ^{c} ^{d} Won the European Golden Shoe while at Real Madrid.
- Manager.^{a} ^{b} ^{c} ^{d} ^{e} ^{f} ^{g} ^{h} ^{i} ^{j} ^{k} ^{l} ^{m} ^{n} ^{o} ^{p} ^{q} ^{r} ^{s} ^{t} Coached Real Madrid later.
- President.^{a} ^{b} Chaired Real Madrid later.

Records and statistics

- A. Arthur Johnson was the first player to score a goal in an official match in Real Madrid's history.
- B. Jaime Lazcano was the first player to score a goal in La Liga in Real Madrid's history.
- C. Ricardo Zamora and José Vicente Train both holds Real's record of Zamora trophies, with three won each.
- D. Chus Alonso was the first Real Madrid player to score in an official match at the Santiago Bernabéu Stadium.
- E. Alfredo Di Stéfano was the first Real Madrid player to win the Ballon d'Or in 1957.
- F. Puskás is the record goalscorer in one match, with six goals.
- G. Puskás and Santillana are Real's record goalscorers in the Spanish Cup, with 49 each.
- H. Santillana is Real's record goalscorer in the Spanish League Cup, with 8.
- I. Hugo Sánchez was the first Real Madrid player to win the European Golden Shoe in 1990.
- J. Iván Zamorano scored the fastest goal in Real's history, 13 seconds after the start of the game.
- K. Míchel is Real Madrid's record most assists in all competitions.
- L. Raúl is the club's record appearance maker in all competitions and in La Liga (with 550).
- M. Luís Figo was the first Real Madrid player to win the FIFA World Player of the Year award, in 2001.
- N. Sergio Ramos has made the most international appearances as Real Madrid player, with 176 games played.
- O. Luka Modrić hold the record for the most trophies won at the club (28).
- P. Cristiano Ronaldo is Real Madrid's record goalscorer in all competitions, record goalscorer in La Liga (with 311), record goalscorer in Europe (with 107), including a record 105 goals in the UEFA Champions league, the club's record league scorer in a single season, with 48 goals, and record scorer in all competitions in one season, with 61 goals, player with the highest number of European Golden Shoes (3), player with the highest number of hat-tricks in Spain (36), including a record 34 in La Liga, first player to score five goals twice in La Liga games, player with the highest number of goals in a single UEFA Champions League season, with 17, first player to score against all of the opposition teams in La Liga in a single season and first player to win three or more Ballon d'Or (in 2013, 2014, 2016 and 2017).
- Q. Karim Benzema holds the record of appearances for Real Madrid as a foreign player.
- R. Yan Diomande is the club's record signing, with a base transfer fee of €125 million, potentially rising to €140 million through add-ons.
