= 1953–54 Real Madrid CF season =

51st season in existence of Real Madrid CF

Real Madrid Club de Futbol
1953–54 season
- President: Santiago Bernabéu
- Manager: Enrique Fernandez Viola
- Stadium: Nuevo Chamartín
- Primera Division: 1st
- Copa del Generalísimo: Semi-finals
- Top goalscorer: League: Alfredo Di Stéfano (27); All: Alfredo Di Stéfano (27)
Home colours	Away colours

The 1953–54 season was Real Madrid Club de Fútbol's 51st season in existence and the club's 23rd consecutive season in the top flight of Spanish football.

Real Madrid won their 3rd Primera División title after a gap of 21 years.

== Summary ==
The club won its third league title over defending champion FC Barcelona after 21 years aimed by several arrivals such as Di Stefano from Millonarios Fútbol Club (included a transfer battle with CF Barcelona) and 20-yrs-old winger from Racing Santander Francisco Gento. On 1 August 1953 Spanish Federation banned the foreign players transfers to La Liga clubs and not lifting the measure until 1956 with the exception of oriundo players, meaning athletes who were born abroad but had Spanish ancestors as Alfredo Di Stéfano had. Also, newcomer striker Alfredo Di Stéfano got the Pichichi trophy of league topscorer with 27 goals. In June, the squad reached 1954 Copa del Generalísimo semi-finals being defeated by FC Barcelona. Real played without Di Stéfano, as the Copa del Generalísimo only allowed Spanish players to enter at the time.

== Squad ==
Note: Flags indicate national team as defined under FIFA eligibility rules; some limited exceptions apply. Players may hold more than one non-FIFA nationality.

No.	Pos.	Nation	Player
-	GK	ESP	Pazos
-	GK	ESP	Juan Alonso
-	GK	ESP	Cosme
-	DF	ESP	Navarro
-	DF	ESP	Oliva
-	DF	ESP	Lesmes II
-	DF	ESP	Zárraga
-	MF	ESP	Miguel Muñoz
-	MF	ESP	Luis Molowny
-	MF	ESP	Becerril

No.	Pos.	Nation	Player
-	MF	ESP	Sergio Rodríguez
-	MF	ESP	Vazquez
-	FW	ARG	Roque Olsen
-	FW	ARG	Alfredo Di Stéfano
-	FW	ESP	Joseito
-	FW	ESP	Francisco Gento
-	FW	ESP	Atienza
-	FW	ESP	Pérez Payá
-	FW	ESP	Mateos
-	FW	URU	Julio Cesar Britos

=== Transfers ===
In
Pos.	Name	from	Type
FW	Alfredo Di Stefano	Millonarios FC	–
FW	Francisco Gento	Racing Santander	–
GK	Manuel Pazos	Celta de Vigo	
FW	Atienza	Celta de Vigo	
FW	Perez Payá	Atletico Madrid	
MF	Becerril	CD Malaga	–
MF	Sergio Rodriguez	CD Malaga	–
FW	Mateos	Plus Ultra	–
FW	Julio Cesar Britos	Peñarol	–
FW	Vazquez	Plus Ultra	–

Out
Pos.	Name	To	Type
FW	Pahiño	Deportivo La Coruña	–
MF	Olmedo	Celta de Vigo	–
DF	Louis Hon		–
GK	Adauto	Celta de Vigo	–
FW	Cedres	Lerida	–
FW	Espina	Racing Santander	–
DF	Clemente		–
FW	Gausí	Celta de Vigo	–
FW	Ricardo	Las Palmas	–

== Competitions ==
=== La Liga ===
==== League table ====
Pos	Team	Pld	W	D	L	GF	GA	GD	Pts
1	Real Madrid (C)	30	17	6	7	72	41	+31	40
2	Barcelona	30	16	4	10	74	39	+35	36
3	Valencia	30	14	6	10	69	51	+18	34
4	Español	30	14	6	10	50	36	+14	34
5	Sevilla	30	15	2	13	57	49	+8	32

Source: BDFútbol
Rules for classification: 1) Points; 2) Head-to-head results; 3) Goal difference; 4) Number of goals scored
(C) Champions

==== Results by round ====
Round	1	2	3	4	5	6	7	8	9	10	11	12	13	14	15	16	17	18	19	20	21	22	23	24	25	26	27	28	29	30
Ground	H	A	H	A	H	A	H	A	H	A	H	A	H	A	H	A	H	A	H	A	H	A	H	A	H	A	H	A	H	A
Result	W	W	W	W	W	L	W	W	D	W	L	D	W	D	W	D	L	D	W	D	W	L	W	W	W	L	W	L	W	L
Position	5	3	1	1	1	2	1	1	1	1	1	1	1	1	1	1	1	1	1	2	1	1	1	1	1	1	1	1	1	1

Source: Competitive matches
A = Away; H = Home; W = Win; D = Draw; L = Loss; = Leader

==== Matches ====
13 September 1953 1	Real Madrid	2–0	Osasuna	Madrid
	Roque Olsen 2'; Julio Cesar Britos 82'	Report		Stadium: Nuevo Estadio Chamartín; Referee: Echeverria

20 September 1953 2	Athletic Bilbao	2–3	Real Madrid	Bilbao
	Venancio 40'; Zarra 74'	Report	Julio César Britos 14'; José Iglesias Fernández 41'; Roque Olsen 81'	Stadium: San Mamés; Referee: Arqué Martin

27 September 1953 3	Real Madrid	4–2	Racing Santander	Madrid
	Luis Molowny 23'; Roque Olsen 30'; Di Stéfano 56'; Roque Olsen 80'	Report	Vázquez 72'; León 75'	Stadium: Nuevo Estadio Chamartín; Referee: Rivero Lecuona

4 October 1953 4	Real Oviedo	0–4	Real Madrid	Oviedo
		Report	José Iglesias Fernández 6'; Molowny 22'; Molowny 60'; José Iglesias Fernández 86'	Stadium: Carlos Tartiere; Referee: Lloris Antonino

11 October 1953 5	Real Madrid	2–1	Deportivo La Coruña	Madrid
	Roque Olsen 27'; Di Stéfano 75'	Report	Oswaldo 80'	Stadium: Nuevo Chamartín; Referee: Blanco Perez

18 October 1953 6	Sevilla FC	2–1	Real Madrid	Sevilla
	Loren 12'; Arza 25'	Report	Di Stéfano 22'	Referee: Zariquiegui Izco

25 October 1953 7	Real Madrid	5–0	FC Barcelona	Madrid
	Di Stéfano 10'; Roque Olsen 34'; Roque Olsen 35'; Molowny 39'; Di Stéfano 85'	Report		Stadium: Nuevo Chamartín; Referee: García Fernandez

1 November 1953 8	Atlético Madrid	3–4	Real Madrid	Madrid
	Escudero 7' (pen.); Miguel 25'; Coque 62'	Report	Di Stéfano 1' (pen.); Di Stéfano 40' (pen.); Di Stéfano 68'; Roque Olsen 76'	Stadium: Metropolitano; Referee: Gonzalez Echeverria

15 November 1953 9	Real Madrid	1–1	Real Sociedad	Madrid
	Perez Payá 46'	Report	Echeveste 13'	Stadium: Nuevo Chamartín; Referee: Gomez Arribas

22 November 1953 10	Real Jaén CF	1–2	Real Madrid	Jaén
	Hidalgo 89'	Report	Di Stéfano 17'; Roque Olsen 24'	Referee: Tamarit Falaguera

29 November 1953 11	Real Madrid	1–2	Real Valladolid	Madrid
	Di Stéfano 52'		Morro 44'; Domingo 45'	Stadium: Nuevo Chamartín; Referee: Iturrioz Larrinaga

6 December 1953 12	Real Gijón	1–1	Real Madrid	Gijón
	Peiró 83'	Report	Di Stéfano 43' (pen.)	Stadium: Estadio El Molinon; Referee: Mazagatos Vicario

13 December 1953 13	Real Madrid	3–0	Celta de Vigo	Madrid
	Perez Payá 16'; Di Stéfano 20'; Molowny 55'	Report		Stadium: Nuevo Chamartín; Referee: Gardeazabal Garay

20 December 1953 14	Valencia CF	0–0	Real Madrid	Valencia
		Report		Stadium: Estadio Mestalla; Referee: Gardeazabal Garay

27 December 1953 15	Real Madrid	4–3	Español	Madrid
	Molowny 29'; Di Stéfano 46'; Molowny 70'; Molowny 80'	Report	Marcet 20'; Marcet 50'; Cruellas 64'; Cata (red card) 81'	Stadium: Nuevo Chamartín; Referee: Rivero Lecuona

10 January 1954 16	Osasuna	1–1	Real Madrid	Pamplona
	Fustero 86'	Report	José Iglesias Fernández 43'	Stadium: San Juan; Referee: Gardeazabal Garay

17 January 1954 17	Real Madrid	2–3	Athletic Bilbao	Madrid
	Roque Olsen 12'; Luis Molowny 87'	Report	Mauri 5'; Arieta 66'; Arieta 82'	Stadium: Nuevo Chamartín; Referee: Gonzalez Echeverria

24 January 1954 18	Racing Santander	1–1	Real Madrid	Santander
	Moro 54'	Report	Molowny 49'	Stadium: Campos de Sport del Sardinero; Referee: Mazagatos Vicario

31 January 1954 19	Real Madrid	1–0	Real Oviedo	Madrid
	Molowny 79'	Report		Stadium: Nuevo Chamartín; Referee: Torrico Córdoba

7 February 1954 20	Deportivo La Coruña	2–2	Real Madrid	La Coruña
	Pahiño 20'; Moll 31'	Report	Di Stéfano 13'; Di Stéfano 89'	Stadium: Nuevo Riazor; Referee: Mazagatos Vicario

14 February 1954 21	Real Madrid	1–0	Sevilla CF	Madrid
	José Iglesias Fernández 25'	Report		Stadium: Nuevo Chamartín; Referee: Gardeazabal Garay

21 February 1954 22	FC Barcelona	5–1	Real Madrid	Barcelona
	Tejada 14'; Cesar 50'; Moreno 74'; Tejada 86'; Manchon 89'	Report	Di Stéfano 6'	Stadium: Camp de Les Corts; Referee: Iturrioz Larrinaga

28 February 1954 23	Real Madrid	2–1	Atlético Madrid	Madrid
	Di Stéfano 24'; Di Stéfano 84'	Report	Silva 5'	Stadium: Nuevo Chamartín; Referee: Fombona Fernandez

7 March 1954 24	Real Sociedad	3–6	Real Madrid	San Sebastián
	Zubillaga 45'; Perez 56'; Zubillaga 89'	Report	José Iglesias Fernández 5'; Atienza 10'; Roque Olsen 16'; Roque Olsen 20'; Luis Molowny 58'; Atienza 82'	Stadium: Atocha; Referee: Gardeazabal Garay

21 March 1954 25	Real Madrid	6–0	Real Jaén CF	Madrid
	Roque Olsen 6'; Molowny 9'; Di Stéfano 12'; Di Stéfano 18'; Atienza 40'; Navarro 62'	Report		Stadium: Nuevo Chamartín; Referee: Iturrioz Larrinaga

28 March 1954 26	Real Valladolid	4–3	Real Madrid	Valladolid
	Rabadan 30'; Lolo 75'; Rabadan 76'; Morro 78'	Report	Di Stéfano 14'; José Iglesias Fernández 23'; Atienza 37'	Stadium: Municipal de Zorrilla; Referee: Gonzalez Echeverria

4 April 1954 27	Real Madrid	4–0	Real Gijón	Madrid
	Enrique Mateos 17'; Di Stéfano 36' Di Stéfano 50' Di Stéfano 58' (pen.)	Report		Stadium: Nuevo Chamartín; Referee: Rivero Lecuona

11 April 1954 28	Celta de Vigo	1–0	Real Madrid	Vigo
	Villar 45'	Report		Stadium: Estadio Balaídos; Referee: Santos Lopez

18 April 1954 29	Real Madrid	4–0	Valencia CF	Madrid
	Di Stéfano 33'; Di Stéfano 38' Roque Olsen 59' Di Stéfano 77'			Stadium: Nuevo Chamartín; Referee: Santos Lopez

25 April 1954 30	Español	2–1	Real Madrid	Barcelona
	Mauri 1'; Marcet 57'	Report	Roque Olsen 14'	Stadium: Estadio Sarriá; Referee: Tamarit Falaguera

=== Copa del Generalísimo ===
==== Eightfinals ====
2 May 1954	Deportivo Alavés	1–2	Real Madrid	Vitoria
		Report

9 May 1954	Real Madrid	7–0	Deportivo Alavés	Madrid
		Report		Stadium: Chamartín

==== Quarter-finals ====
16 May 1954	Racing Santander	3–1	Real Madrid	Santander
		Report		Stadium: Estadio El Sardinero

16 May 1954	Real Madrid	3–0	Racing Santander	Madrid
		Report		Stadium: Chamartín

==== Semi-finals ====
6 June 1954	Real Madrid	1–0	FC Barcelona	Madrid
		Report		Stadium: Chamartín

6 June 1954	FC Barcelona	3–1	Real Madrid	Barcelona
		Report		Stadium: Camp de Les Corts

== Statistics ==
=== Squad statistics ===
competition	points	total						GD
competition	points	G	V	N	P	Gf	Gs	GD
1953–54 La Liga	40	30	17	6	7	72	41	+31
Copa del Generalísimo	–	6	4	1	1	14	6	+8
Total		42	36	6	10	113	55	+58

=== Players statistics ===
No.	Pos	Nat	Player	Total		La Liga		Copa	
No.	Pos	Nat	Player	Apps	Goals	Apps	Goals	Apps	Goals
	GK	(Spain) ESP	Pazos	17	-24	17	-24	0	0
	DF	(Spain) ESP	Navarro	33	1	29	1	4	0
	DF	(Spain) ESP	Oliva	34	0	28	0	6	0
	DF	(Spain) ESP	Lesmes	29	1	25	0	4	1
	MF	(Spain) ESP	Zarraga	34	0	28	0	6	0
	DF	(Spain) ESP	Miguel Muñoz	33	0	27	0	6	0
	FW	(Spain) ESP	Molowny	28	16	23	13	5	3
	FW	(Argentina) ARG	Roque Olsen	23	15	23	15	0	0
	FW	(Argentina) ARG	Alfredo Di Stéfano	28	27	28	27	0	0
	MF	(Spain) ESP	Joseito	28	9	22	7	6	2
	FW	(Spain) ESP	Gento	21	0	17	0	4	0
	GK	(Spain) ESP	Juan Alonso	19	-24	13	-17	6	-7
	FW	(Spain) ESP	Atienza	19	8	13	4	6	4
	MF	(Spain) ESP	Perez Paya	13	3	10	2	3	1
	MF	(Spain) ESP	Becerril	13	0	10	0	3	0
	DF	(Spain) ESP	Sergio Rodríguez	5	0	5	0	0	0
	MF	(Spain) ESP	Mateos	8	5	4	1	4	4
	FW	(Uruguay) URU	Julio Cesar Britos	3	2	3	2	0	0
	DF	(Spain) ESP	Juan Vazquez	2	0	2	0	0	0
	DF	(Spain) ESP	Campa	3	0	2	0	1	0
	DF	(Spain) ESP	Alonso	2	0	0	0	2	0

- Source: https://www.bdfutbol.com/en/t/t1953-542.html
