= 1949–50 Real Madrid CF season =

47th season in existence of Real Madrid CF

Real Madrid Club de Futbol
1949–50 season
- President: Santiago Bernabéu
- Manager: Michael Keeping
- Stadium: Nuevo Chamartín
- Primera Division: 4th
- Copa del Generalísimo: Semi-finals
- Top goalscorer: Pahiño (22)
Home colours	Away colours

The 1949–50 season was Real Madrid Club de Fútbol's 47th season in existence and the club's 18th consecutive season in the top flight of Spanish football.

== Summary ==
During summer basque goalkeeper Juan Alonso arrived to the club from Ferrol along with him defender Joaquin Navarro was bought to Sabadell Shockingly the squad lost the 1950 Copa del Generalísimo Semi-finals stage 3–5 against underdogs Real Valladolid. Michael Keeping managed the team towards the first spot on round 8 and remained here until round 20, then the squad collapsed for the final rounds closing on the 4th place.

== Squad ==
Note: Flags indicate national team as defined under FIFA eligibility rules; some limited exceptions apply. Players may hold more than one non-FIFA nationality.

No.	Pos.	Nation	Player
—	GK	ESP	Juan Alonso
—	DF	ESP	Navarro
—	DF	ESP	Azcarate
—	DF	ESP	Guillermo Pont
—	MF	ESP	Miguel Muñoz
—	MF	ESP	Olmedo
—	MF	ESP	Luis Molowny
—	MF	ESP	Narro
—	FW	ESP	Cabrera
—	FW	ESP	Pahiño
—	FW	ESP	Sabino Barinaga

No.	Pos.	Nation	Player
—	GK	ESP	Adauto
—	DF	ESP	Mariscal
—	FW	ESP	Macala
—	DF	ESP	Clemente
—	MF	ESP	Montalvo
—	GK	ESP	Garcia Martin
—	FW	ESP	Rafa
—	DF	ESP	Marcet
—	MF	ESP	Toni
—	DF	ESP	Soto
—	DF	ESP	García
—	FW	ESP	Arsuaga
—	DF	ESP	Juanco

=== Transfers ===
In
Pos.	Name	from	Type
GK	Juan Alonso	Ferrol	
DF	Navarro	Sabadell	
FW	Rafa		
MF	Toni	Sabadell	
DF	García	Real Gijón	
FW	Juanco		

Out
Pos.	Name	To	Type
MF	Juan Antonio Ipiña		retired
MF	Pablo Vidal	RCD Mallorca	
MF	John Fox Watson	Sabadell	
MF	Alonso	Real Zaragoza	

== Competitions ==
=== La Liga ===
==== Position by round ====
Round	1	2	3	4	5	6	7	8	9	10	11	12	13	14	15	16	17	18	19	20	21	22	23	24	25	26
Ground	H	A	H	A	H	A	H	A	H	A	H	A	H	A	H	A	H	A	H	A	H	A	H	A	H	A
Result	W	L	W	D	W	D	W	W	W	D	D	W	D	L	D	W	D	L	D	L	W	L	D	L	W	W
Position	1	9	4	4	2	3	2	1	1	1	1	1	1	1	1	1	1	1	1	3	3	3	4	6	4	4

Source: www.lfp.es
A = Away; H = Home; W = Win; D = Draw; L = Loss

==== League table ====
Pos	Team	Pld	W	D	L	GF	GA	GD	Pts
2	Deportivo La Coruña	26	12	8	6	48	38	+10	32
3	Valencia	26	12	7	7	71	43	+28	31 (Note: Valencia finished ahead of Real Madrid on overall goal difference.)
4	Real Madrid	26	11	9	6	60	49	+11	31
5	Barcelona	26	13	3	10	67	47	+20	29 (Note: Barcelona finished ahead of Atlético Bilbao on head-to-head points: Barcelona 5–0 Atlético Bilbao, Atlético Bilbao 3–1 Barcelona.)
6	Atlético Bilbao	26	12	5	9	72	66	+6	29

Source: BDFútbol
Rules for classification: 1) points; 2) head-to-head points; 3) head-to-head goal difference; 4) goal difference; 5) number of goals scored.

==== Matches ====
4 September 1949 1	Real Madrid	4–2	Sevilla CF	Madrid
		Report		Stadium: Nuevo Chamartín

11 September 1949 2	Deportivo La Coruña	3–0	Real Madrid	A Coruña
		Report		Stadium: Riazor

18 September 1949 3	Real Madrid	6–1	CF Barcelona	Madrid
		Report		Stadium: Nuevo Chamartín

25 September 1949 4	Real Sociedad	1–1	Real Madrid	San Sebastián
		Report		Stadium: Atocha

2 October 1949 5	Real Madrid	6–2	Real Oviedo	Madrid
		Report		Stadium: Nuevo Chamartín

9 October 1949 6	Valencia CF	2–2	Real Madrid	Valencia
		Report		Stadium: Estadio Mestalla

16 October 1949 7	Real Madrid	4–2	Atlético Madrid	Madrid
		Report		Stadium: Nuevo Chamartín

23 October 1949 8	CD Málaga	1–3	Real Madrid	Málaga
		Report		Stadium: La Rosaleda

30 October 1949 9	Real Madrid	1–0	Celta Vigo	Madrid
		Report		Stadium: Nuevo Chamartín

6 November 1949 10	Español	1–1	Real Madrid	Barcelona
		Report		Stadium: Sarriá

13 November 1949 11	Real Madrid	2–2	Athletic Bilbao	Madrid
		Report		Stadium: Nuevo Chamartín

20 November 1949 12	Gimnàstic de Tarragona	0–3	Real Madrid	Tarragona
		Report		Stadium: Avenida Cataluña

4 December 1949 13	Real Madrid	1–1	Real Valladolid	Madrid
		Report		Stadium: Nuevo Chamartín

11 December 1949 14	Sevilla CF	2–1	Real Madrid	Sevilla
		Report		Stadium: Nervión

18 December 1949 15	Real Madrid	1–1	Deportivo La Coruña	Madrid
		Report		Stadium: Nuevo Chamartín

15 January 1950 16	CF Barcelona	2–3	Real Madrid	Barcelona
		Report		Stadium: Camp de Les Corts

22 January 1950 17	Real Madrid	2–2	Real Sociedad	Madrid
		Report		Stadium: Nuevo Chamartín

29 January 1950 18	Real Oviedo	2–0	Real Madrid	Oviedo
		Report		Stadium: Carlos Tartiere

5 February 1950 19	Real Madrid	2–2	Valencia CF	Madrid
		Report		Stadium: Nuevo Chamartín

12 February 1950 20	Atlético Madrid	5–1	Real Madrid	Madrid
		Report		Stadium: Metropolitano

19 February 1950 21	Real Madrid	2–1	CD Málaga	Madrid
		Report		Stadium: Nuevo Chamartín

26 February 1950 22	Celta Vigo	5–2	Real Madrid	Vigo
		Report		Stadium: Estadio Balaídos

5 March 1950 23	Real Madrid	1–1	Español	Madrid
		Report		Stadium: Nuevo Chamartín

12 March 1950 24	Athletic Bilbao	6–2	Real Madrid	Bilbao
		Report		Stadium: San Mamés

16 April 1950 25	Real Madrid	5–1	Gimnastica de Tarragona	Madrid
		Report		Stadium: Nuevo Chamartín

23 April 1950 26	Real Valladolid	1–4	Real Madrid	Valladolid
		Report		Stadium: Estadio José Zorrilla

=== Copa del Generalísimo ===
==== Semi-finals ====
13 May 1950	Real Madrid	2–2	Real Valladolid	Madrid
		Report		Stadium: Nuevo Chamartín

20 May 1950	Real Valladolid	3–1	Real Madrid	Valladolid
		Report		Stadium: Estadio José Zorrilla

== Statistics ==
=== Squad statistics ===
competition	points	total						GD
competition	points	G	V	N	P	Gf	Gs	GD
1949–50 La Liga	40	30	17	6	7	72	41	+31
1950 Copa del Generalísimo	–	6	4	1	1	14	6	+8
Total		42	36	6	10	113	55	+58

=== Players statistics ===
No.	Pos	Nat	Player	Total		1949–50 La Liga		1950 Copa del Generalísimo	
No.	Pos	Nat	Player	Apps	Goals	Apps	Goals	Apps	Goals
	GK	(Spain) ESP	Juan Alonso	21	-42	21	-42		
	DF	(Spain) ESP	Navarro	23	1	23	1		
	DF	(Spain) ESP	Azcarate	17	0	17	0		
	DF	(Spain) ESP	Guillermo Pont	12	0	12	0		
	MF	(Spain) ESP	Miguel Muñoz	24	4	24	4		
	MF	(Spain) ESP	Olmedo	23	4	23	4		
	MF	(Spain) ESP	Luis Molowny	21	12	21	12		
	MF	(Spain) ESP	Narro	20	1	20	1		
	FW	(Spain) ESP	Cabrera	22	6	22	6		
	FW	(Spain) ESP	Pahiño	22	22	22	22		
	FW	(Spain) ESP	Barinaga	10	2	10	2		
	GK	(Spain) ESP	Adauto	3	-6	3	-6		
	DF	(Spain) ESP	Mariscal	10	0	10	0		
	FW	(Spain) ESP	Macala	10	2	10	2		
	DF	(Spain) ESP	Clemente	9	0	9	0		
	MF	(Spain) ESP	Montalvo	7	0	7	0		
	GK	(Spain) ESP	Garcia Martin	2	-1	2	-1		
	FW	(Spain) ESP	Rafa	7	0	7	0		
	DF	(Spain) ESP	Marcet	6	2	6	2		
	MF	(Spain) ESP	Toni	5	0	5	0		
	DF	(Spain) ESP	Soto	5	0	5	0		
	DF	(Spain) ESP	García	4	0	4	0		
	FW	(Spain) ESP	Arsuaga	2	1	2	1		
	DF	(Spain) ESP	Juanco	1	0	1	0		
