= 1950–51 Real Madrid CF season =

48th season in existence of Real Madrid CF

Real Madrid Club de Futbol
1950–51 season
- President: Santiago Bernabéu
- Manager: Michael Keeping (until 23 October 1950); Baltasar Albeniz (until 10 March 1951); Hector Scarone
- Stadium: Nuevo Chamartín
- Primera Division: 9th
- Copa del Generalísimo: Semi-finals
- Top goalscorer: Pahiño (21)
Home colours	Away colours

The 1950–51 season was Real Madrid Club de Fútbol's 48th season in existence and the club's 19th consecutive season in the top flight of Spanish football.

== Summary ==
During the summer Santiago Bernabéu signed two French footballers, Jean Luciano and Louis Hon, from OGC Nice. Michael Keeping was sacked on 23 October by Bernabéu after three massive losses against Real Sociedad, FC Barcelona and Deportivo La Coruña. The club appointed Baltasar Albeniz who could not improve the situation and was sacked on 5 March after a 0–4 defeat to Sevilla. Then, Bernabeu brought Uruguayan head coach Hector Scarone who managed the team to ninth, avoiding relegation to the Second Division.

Real reached the 1951 Copa del Generalísimo semi-finals and were defeated by Real Sociedad 0–3 on aggregate.

== Squad ==
Note: Flags indicate national team as defined under FIFA eligibility rules; some limited exceptions apply. Players may hold more than one non-FIFA nationality.

No.	Pos.	Nation	Player
—	GK	(Spain) ESP	Juan Alonso
—	GK	(Spain) ESP	Garcia Martin
—	DF	(Spain) ESP	Joaquin Navarro
—	DF	(France) FRA	Louis Hon
—	DF	(Spain) ESP	Guillermo Pont
—	DF	(Spain) ESP	Clemente
—	DF	(Spain) ESP	Miguel Cabrera
—	DF	(Spain) ESP	Joaquín Oliva
—	DF	(Spain) ESP	Azcarate
—	DF	(Spain) ESP	García
—	DF	(Hungary) HUN	Gyorgy Nemes

No.	Pos.	Nation	Player
—	MF	(Spain) ESP	Miguel Muñoz
—	MF	(Spain) ESP	Jose Montalvo
—	MF	(Spain) ESP	Luis Molowny
—	MF	(Spain) ESP	Jesus Narro Sancho
—	MF	(France) FRA	Jean Luciano
—	MF	(Spain) ESP	Pablo Olmedo
—	MF	(Argentina) ARG	Roque Olsen
—	FW	(Spain) ESP	Pahiño
—	FW	(Spain) ESP	Macala
—	FW	(Spain) ESP	Arsuaga
—	FW	(Argentina) ARG	Antonio Imbelloni
—	FW	(Spain) ESP	Alfonso Navarro

=== Transfers ===
In
Pos.	Name	from	Type
MF	Hon	OGC Nice	
FW	Luciano	OGC Nice	
DF	Oliva	Espanyol	
FW	Antonio Imbelloni	Almirante Brown	
MF	Roque Olsen	Racing Club	
FW	Navarro	CF Barcelona	
FW	Nemes	Real Santander	

Out
Pos.	Name	To	Type
DF	Mariscal	Real Valladolid	
MF	Marcet	Español	
DF	Toni	Sabadell	
MF	Soto	Español	

== Competitions ==
=== La Liga ===
==== League table ====
Pos	Team	Pld	W	D	L	GF	GA	GD	Pts
7	Atlético Bilbao	30	15	3	12	88	56	+32	33
8	Celta	30	15	3	12	62	56	+6	33
9	Real Madrid	30	13	5	12	80	71	+9	31
10	Real Santander	30	12	6	12	49	60	−11	30
11	Español	30	13	4	13	82	72	+10	30

Source: BDFútbol
Rules for classification: 1) Points; 2) Head-to-head results; 3) Goal difference; 4) Number of goals scored

==== Position by round ====
Round	1	2	3	4	5	6	7	8	9	10	11	12	13	14	15	16	17	18	19	20	21	22	23	24	25	26	27	28	29	30
Ground	H	A	A	H	A	H	A	H	A	H	A	H	A	H	A	A	H	H	A	H	A	H	A	H	A	H	A	H	A	H
Result	W	L	L	W	W	W	L	D	W	L	W	W	L	D	L	L	W	W	L	W	L	W	L	D	L	W	W	L	D	D
Position	3	9	13	11	7	3	8	7	6	7	7	5	6	7	9	11	10	7	10	8	10	9	10	11	11	9	8	9	11	9

Source: www.lfp.es
A = Away; H = Home; W = Win; D = Draw; L = Loss

==== Matches ====
10 September 1950 1	Real Madrid	6–2	Español	Madrid
		Report		Stadium: Nuevo Chamartín

17 September 1950 2	Real Sociedad	6–2	Real Madrid	San Sebastián
		Report		Stadium: Estadio Atocha

24 September 1950 3	CF Barcelona	7–2	Real Madrid	Barcelona
		Report		Stadium: Camp de Les Corts

1 October 1950 4	Real Madrid	3–2	Valencia CF	Madrid
		Report		Stadium: Nuevo Chamartín

8 October 1950 5	UD Lérida	1–6	Real Madrid	Lérida
		Report		Stadium: Camp d'Esports

15 October 1950 6	Real Madrid	7–0	Alcoyano	Madrid
		Report		Stadium: Nuevo Chamartín

22 October 1950 7	Deportivo La Coruña	5–0	Real Madrid	La Coruña
		Report		Stadium: Estadio Riazor

29 October 1950 8	Real Madrid	3–3	Sevilla CF	Madrid
		Report		Stadium: Nuevo Chamartín

5 November 1950 9	Athletic Bilbao	2–5	Real Madrid	Bilbao
		Report		Stadium: San Mames

12 November 1950 10	Real Madrid	3–6	Atlético Madrid	Madrid
		Report		Stadium: Nuevo Chamartín

19 September 1950 11	Real Murcia	2–5	Real Madrid	Murcia
		Report		Stadium: La Condomina

26 November 1950 12	Real Madrid	2–1	Real Valladolid	Madrid
		Report		Stadium: Nuevo Chamartín

3 December 1950 13	Real Santander	1–0	Real Madrid	Santander
		Report		Stadium: El Sardinero

10 December 1950 14	Real Madrid	1–1	Celta Vigo	Madrid
		Report		Stadium: Nuevo Chamartín

17 December 1950 15	CD Málaga	3–0	Real Madrid	Málaga
		Report		Stadium: La Rosaleda

31 December 1950 16	Español	7–1	Real Madrid	Barcelona
		Report		Stadium: Estadio Sarriá

7 January 1951 17	Real Madrid	7–2	Real Sociedad	Madrid
		Report		Stadium: Nuevo Chamartín

14 January 1951 18	Real Madrid	4–1	FC Barcelona	Madrid
		Report		Stadium: Nuevo Chamartín

21 January 1951 19	Valencia CF	2–1	Real Madrid	Valencia
		Report		Stadium: Estadio Mestalla

30 January 1951 20	Real Madrid	7–0	UD Lérida	Madrid
		Report		Stadium: Nuevo Chamartín

4 February 1951 21	Alcoyano	2–1	Real Madrid	Alcoy
		Report		Stadium: Estadio El Collao

25 February 1951 22	Real Madrid	2–1	Deportivo La Coruña	Madrid
		Report		Stadium: Nuevo Chamartín

4 March 1951 23	Sevilla CF	4–0	Real Madrid	Sevilla
		Report		Stadium: Estadio de Nervión

11 March 1951 24	Real Madrid	2–2	Athletic Bilbao	Madrid
		Report		Stadium: Nuevo Chamartín

18 March 1951 25	Atlético Madrid	4–0	Real Madrid	Metropolitano
		Report		Stadium: Madrid

25 March 1951 26	Real Madrid	6–0	Real Murcia	Madrid
		Report		Stadium: Nuevo Chamartín

1 April 1951 27	Real Valladolid	0–1	Real Madrid	Valladolid
		Report		Stadium: Estadio José Zorrilla

8 April 1951 28	Real Madrid	0–1	Real Santander	Madrid
		Report		Stadium: Nuevo Chamartín

15 April 1951 29	Celta Vigo	2–2	Real Madrid	Vigo
		Report		Stadium: Estadio Balaídos

22 April 1951 30	Real Madrid	1–1	CD Málaga	Madrid
		Report		Stadium: Nuevo Chamartín

=== Copa del Generalísimo ===
==== First round ====
29 April 1951	Real Madrid	3–2	Valencia CF
		Report		Referee: Fombona Fernández

2 May 1951	Valencia CF	1–5	Real Madrid
				Referee: Blanco Pérez

==== Quarter-finals ====
6 May 1951	Atlético Madrid	0–1	Real Madrid
		Report		Referee: Zariquiegui Izco

20 May 1951	Real Madrid	1–1	Atlético Madrid
		Report		Referee: Giménez Molina

==== Semi-finals ====
13 May 1951	Real Sociedad	1–0	Real Madrid	San Sebastián
		Report		Stadium: Estadio Atocha

20 May 1951	Real Madrid	0–2	Real Sociedad	Madrid
		Report		Stadium: Nuevo Chamartín

== Statistics ==
=== Players statistics ===
No.	Pos	Nat	Player	Total		Primera Division		1951 Copa del Generalísimo	
No.	Pos	Nat	Player	Apps	Goals	Apps	Goals	Apps	Goals
	GK	(Spain) ESP	Juan Alonso	29	-67	29	-67		
	DF	(Spain) ESP	Navarro	26	0	26	0		
	DF	(France) FRA	Hon	23	0	23	0		
	DF	(Spain) ESP	Guillermo Pont	17	0	17	0		
	MF	(Spain) ESP	Miguel Muñoz	28	9	28	9		
	MF	(Spain) ESP	Montalvo	23	2	23	2		
	MF	(Spain) ESP	Luis Molowny	21	11	21	11		
	MF	(Spain) ESP	Narro	21	11	21	11		
	MF	(France) FRA	Luciano	17	1	17	1		
	MF	(Spain) ESP	Olmedo	17	2	17	2		
	FW	(Spain) ESP	Pahiño	24	21	24	21		
	GK	(Spain) ESP	Garcia Martin	1	-4	1	-4		
	DF	(Spain) ESP	Clemente	16	0	16	0		
	FW	(Spain) ESP	Macala	13	5	13	5		
	DF	(Spain) ESP	Cabrera	13	3	13	3		
	FW	(Spain) ESP	Arsuaga	23	6	23	6		
	DF	(Spain) ESP	Oliva	9	0	9	0		
	FW	(Argentina) ARG	Antonio Imbelloni	5	1	5	1		
	MF	(Argentina) ARG	Roque Olsen	5	4	5	4		
	FW	(Spain) ESP	Navarro	5	2	5	2		
	DF	(Spain) ESP	Azcarate	2	0	2	0		
	DF	(Spain) ESP	García						
	DF	(Hungary) HUN	Nemes						

- Source: http://www.bdfutbol.com/en/t/t1950-512.html
