= List of Real Madrid CF hat-tricks =

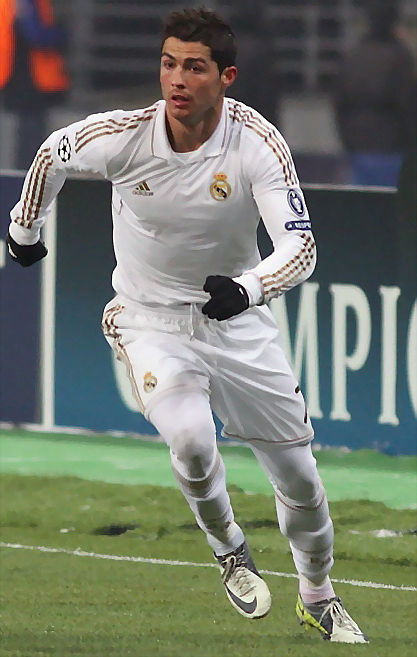
Cristiano Ronaldo holds the record for most hat-tricks. He is also the only one to have scored five goals more than once.

Since 1902, eighty three different players from seventeen different nationalities have scored three or more goals (a hat-trick) in an official match in Real Madrid's history, totaling 301 occurrences. The first player to score a hat-trick was Antonio Neyra on 28 March 1907. Cristiano Ronaldo holds the record for the most hat-tricks, having scored 44 times (34 hat-tricks in La Liga, two in the Copa del Rey, seven in the UEFA Champions League, and one in the FIFA Club World Cup), followed by Alfredo Di Stéfano with 28 and Ferenc Puskás with 23 hat-tricks.

Out of eighty three players, twenty-four have scored four or more goals, while only seven have scored five or more. Ferenc Puskás is the only player to score six goals in a single match, in Real Madrid's 7–1 win over Real Betis in the Copa del Rey on 18 June 1961. Cristiano Ronaldo is the only player to have scored five or more goals more than once, doing so twice in 2015 against Granada and Espanyol, respectively.

The fastest hat-tricks scored by a player were by Gaspar Rubio against Atlético Madrid in 1930 and Pahiño against Gimnàstic Tarragona in 1950, with just four minutes (Pahiño between the second and fourth goals, as he scored four in that match).

The youngest scorer of a hat-trick is Raúl, who scored a hat-trick for Real against Ferencváros, aged 18 years and 113 days, on 18 October 1995. The oldest scorer of a hat-trick is Ferenc Puskás, who was 38 years and 173 days old when he scored four against Feyenoord on 22 September 1965. Puskás is the only player to have scored three or more goals in three consecutive matches, achieving this between 8 May and 5 June 1960, and netting a total of 11 goals across the three games, including four in the 1960 European Cup final against Eintracht Frankfurt.

The longest spell between two hat-tricks was achieved by Fernando Hierro, who scored his third hat-trick on 21 October 1992 against Torpedo Moscow and his fourth over nine years later, on 24 March 2002 against Real Zaragoza. The longest span between first and last hat-trick was achieved by Karim Benzema, who scored his first on 18 December 2010, and his last more than twelve years later on 29 April 2023.

Alfredo Di Stéfano is the only player to have scored a hat-trick of penalty kicks, converting three penalties against Celta Vigo on 28 September 1958. Four players have scored three or more goals with headers in a single match, Fernando Sañudo in 1935, Santillana in 1974 and Jorge Valdano in 1985 each netted three headed goals, while Fernando Morientes scored four headers in Real's 7–0 victory against Las Palmas on 10 February 2002, this remains a world shared record in an official match in the 21st century.

In fourteen total matches, two Real Madrid players scored a hat-trick in the same match. In six of those matches a player scored four goals while the other managed to score three. Only in one of those matches one player scored five goals and the other one with four.

Appearances and goals are for first-team official games, including those in La Liga, Copa del Rey, Copa de la Liga, Copa de la Coronación, Supercopa de España, Copa Eva Duarte, UEFA Champions League, UEFA Europa League, UEFA Cup Winners' Cup, Latin Cup, UEFA Super Cup, FIFA Club World Cup, Intercontinental Cup, FIFA Intercontinental Cup and Copa Iberoamericana. The following list does not include pre-season friendly / invitational tournaments, nor does it include regional tournaments such as Campeonato Regional Centro and Copa Federación Centro.

== List of hat-tricks ==
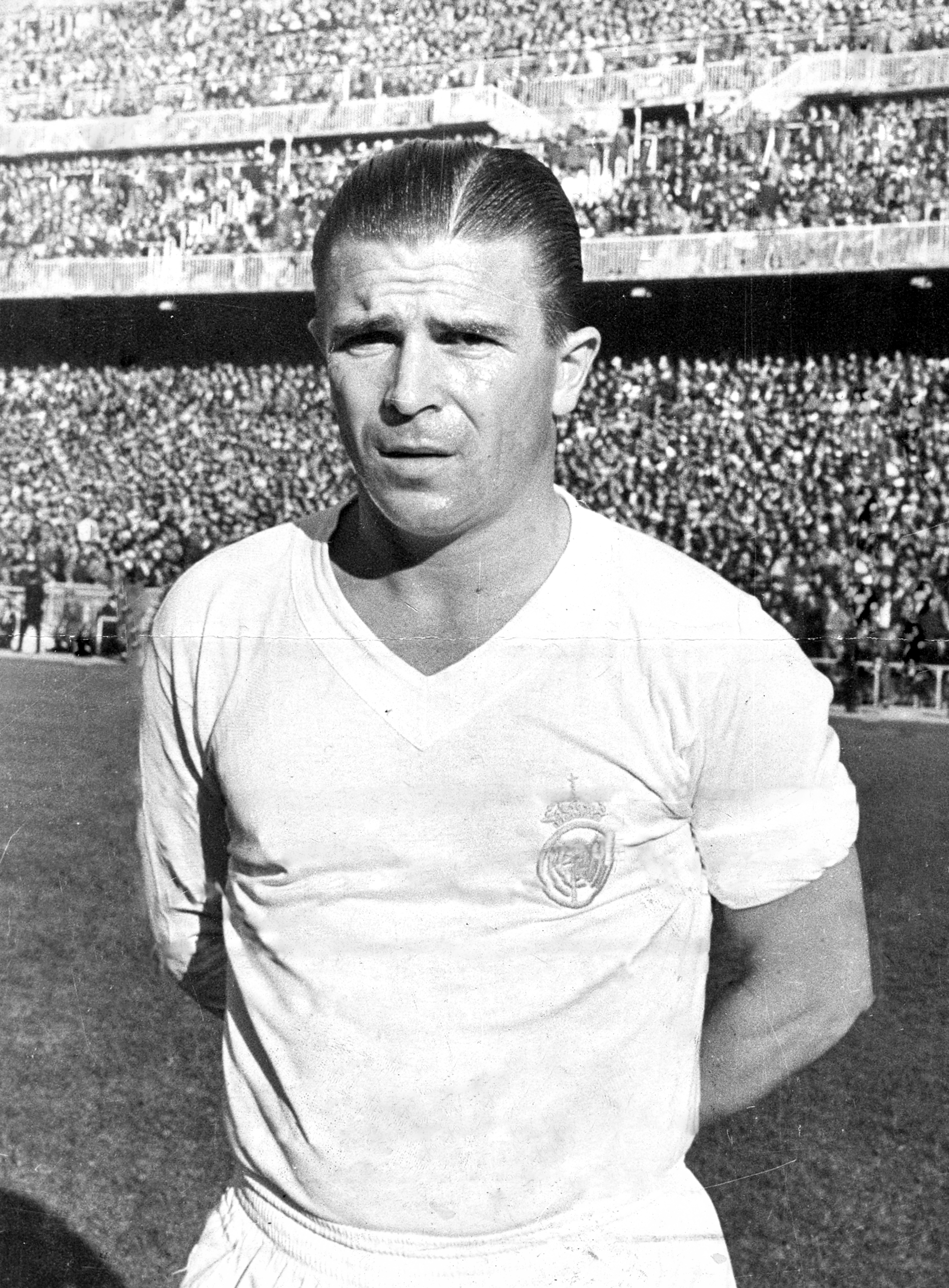
Ferenc Puskás scored three consecutive hat-tricks. He is also the only Real's player to have scored six goals in a single match.

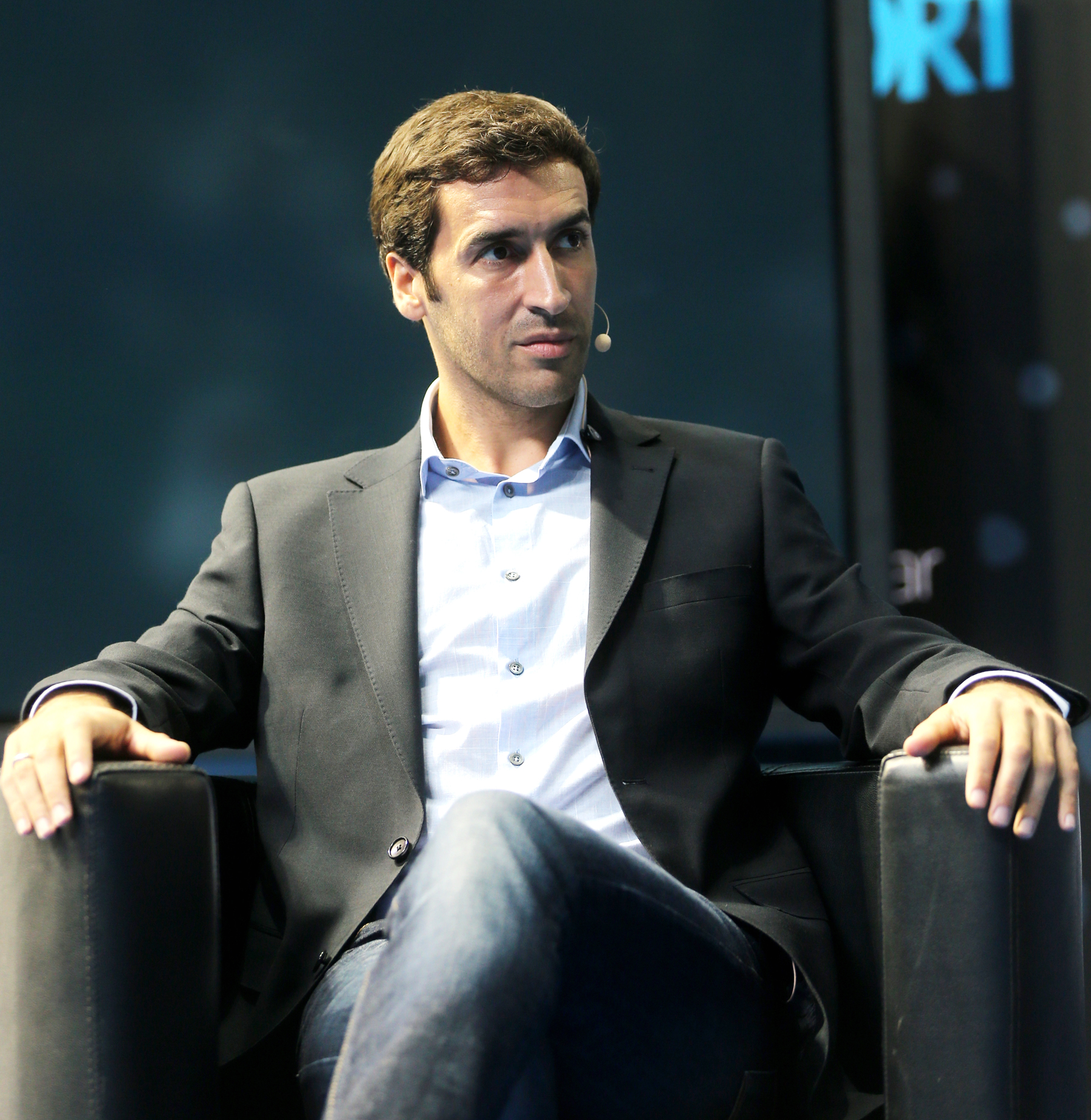
Alongside Cristiano Ronaldo, Raúl scored a hat-trick in four different competitions.

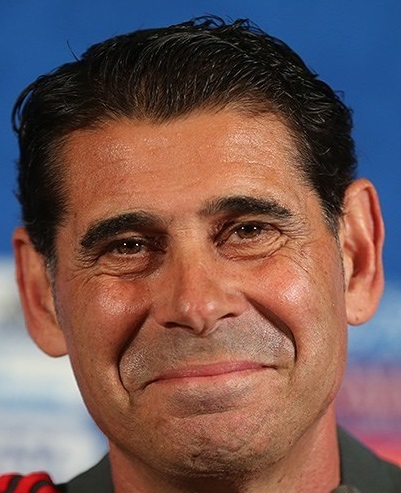
Fernando Hierro scored four hat-tricks as a defender.

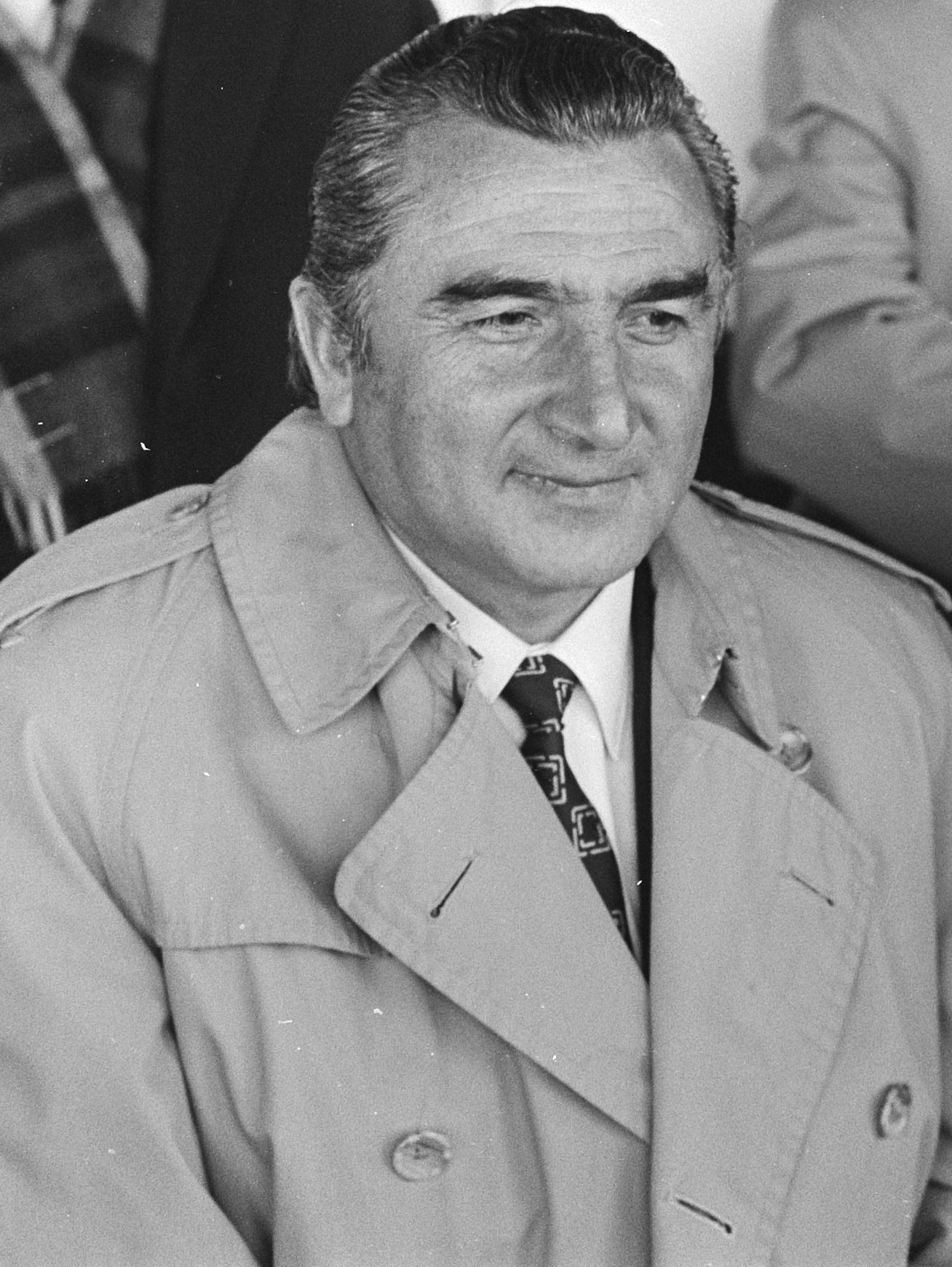
Miguel Muñoz scored five goals in a single match.

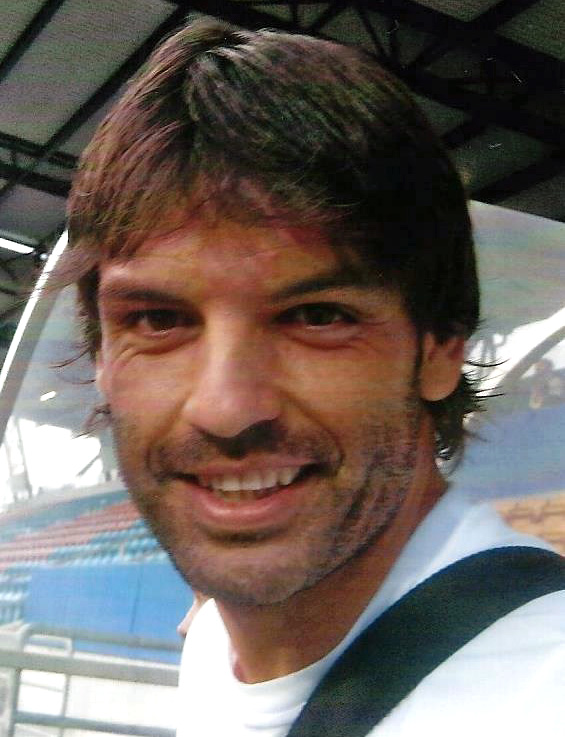
Fernando Morientes scored five goals in a single match, four of them were headers.

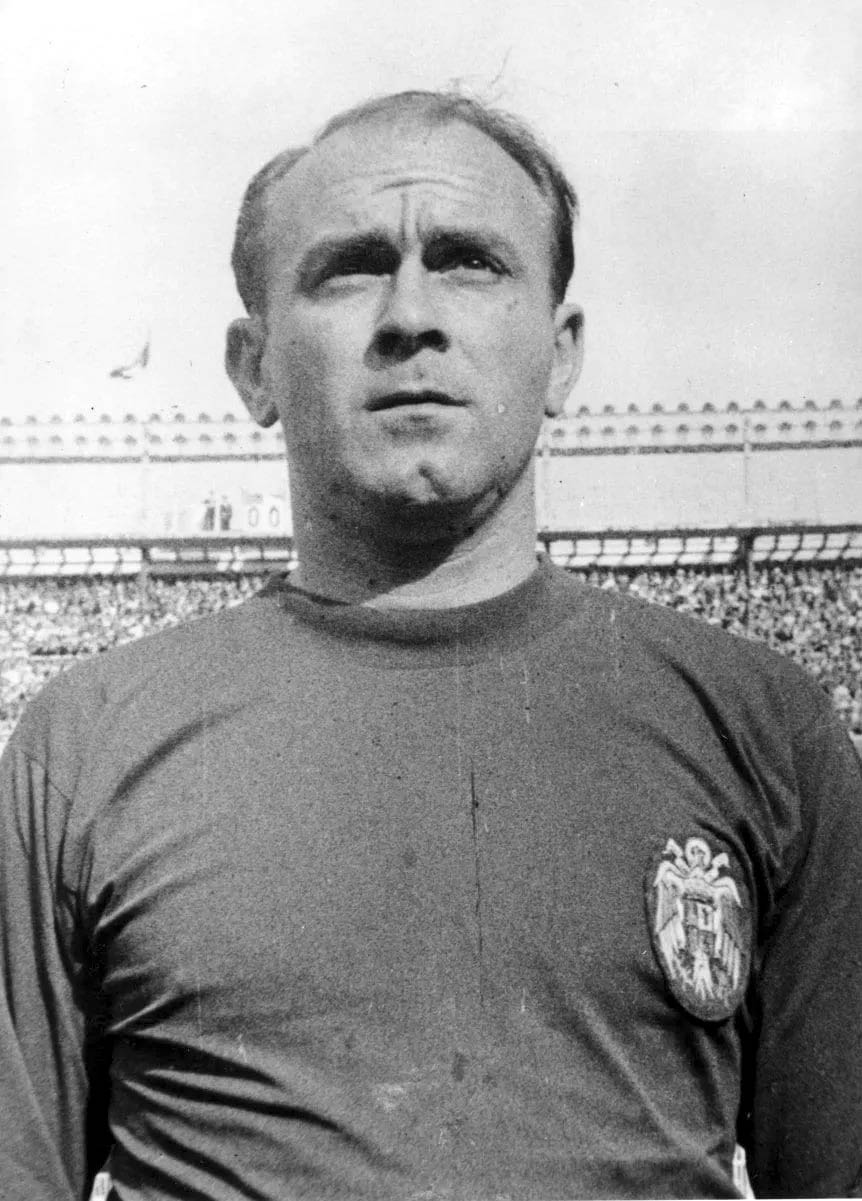
Alfredo Di Stéfano scored 28 hat-tricks with Real Madrid.

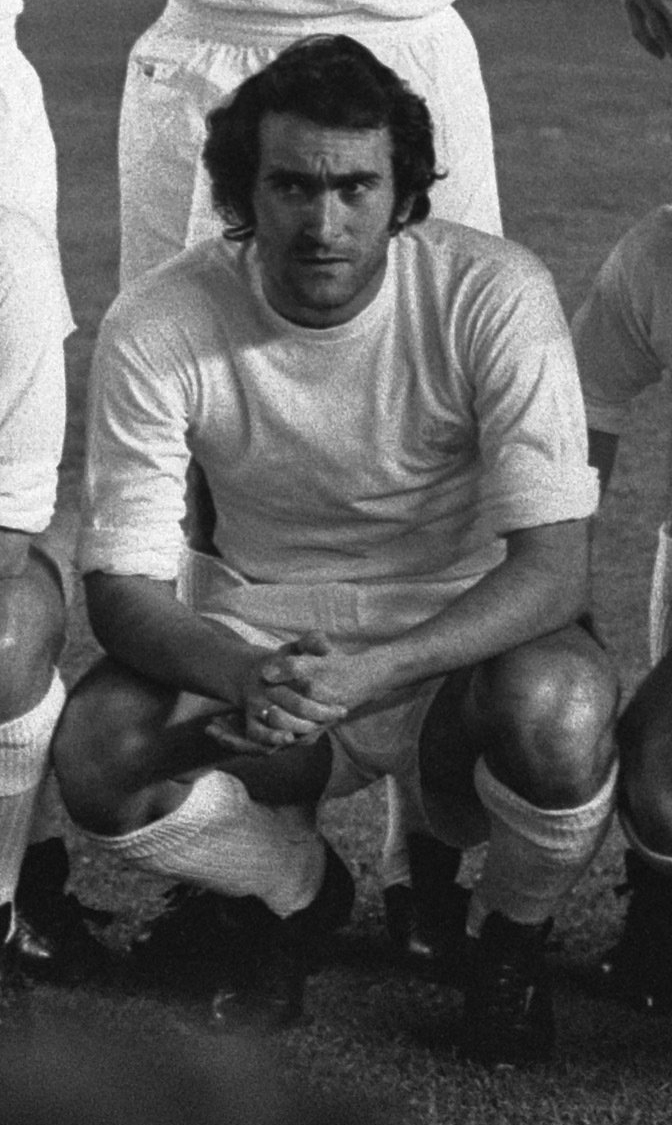
Pirri scored five hat-tricks.

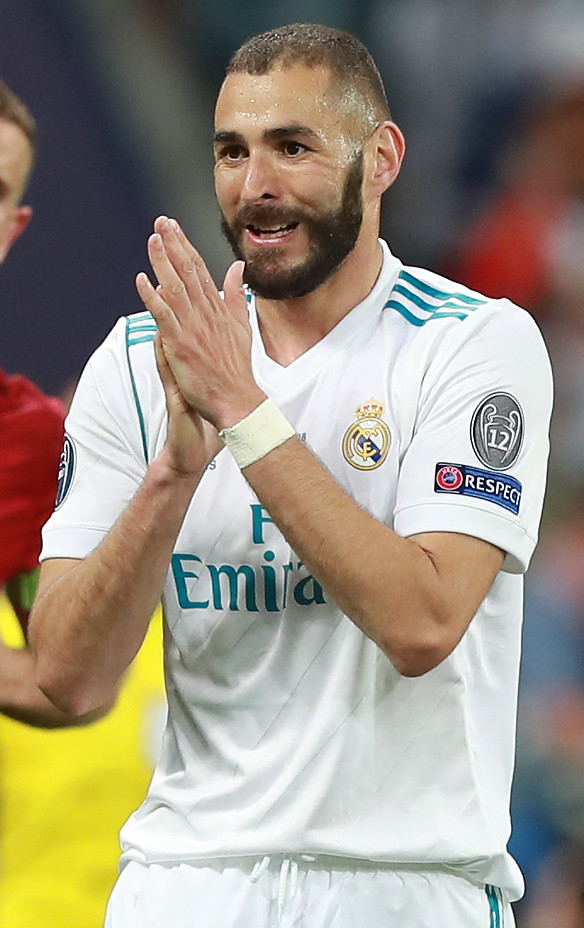
Karim Benzema scored eleven hat-tricks.

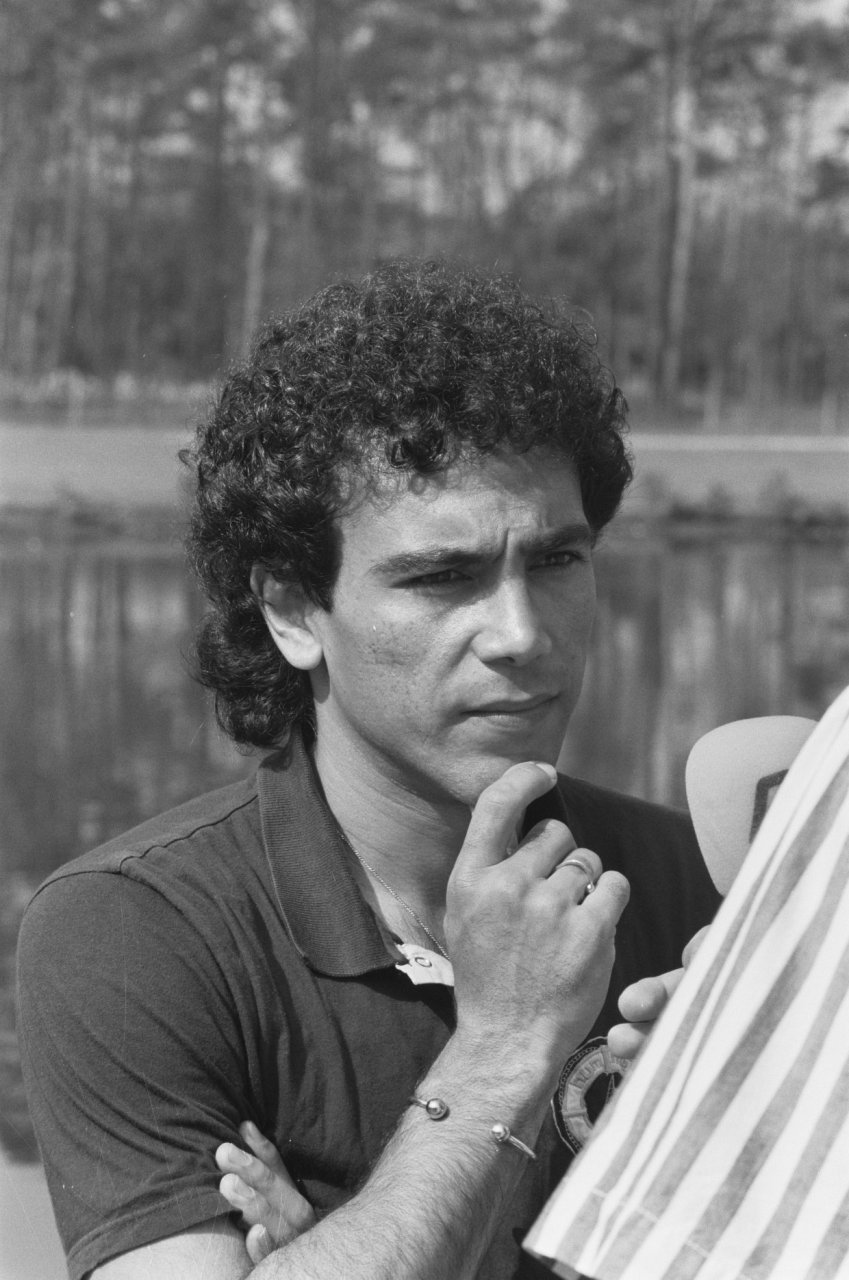
Hugo Sánchez scored eight hat-tricks.

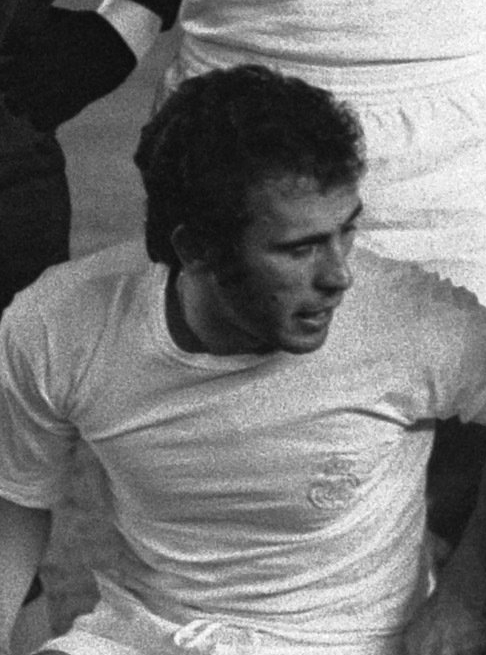
Amancio scored six hat-tricks, including a hat-trick in seven minutes against Sparta Prague in 1968.

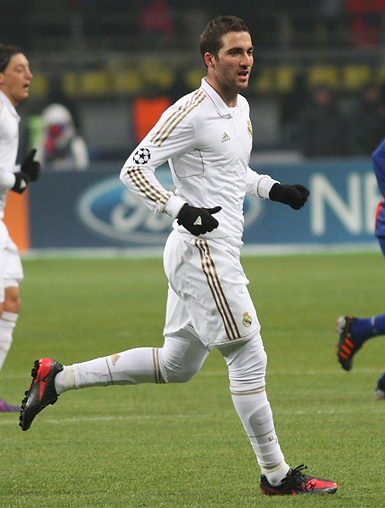
Gonzalo Higuaín scored five hat-tricks.

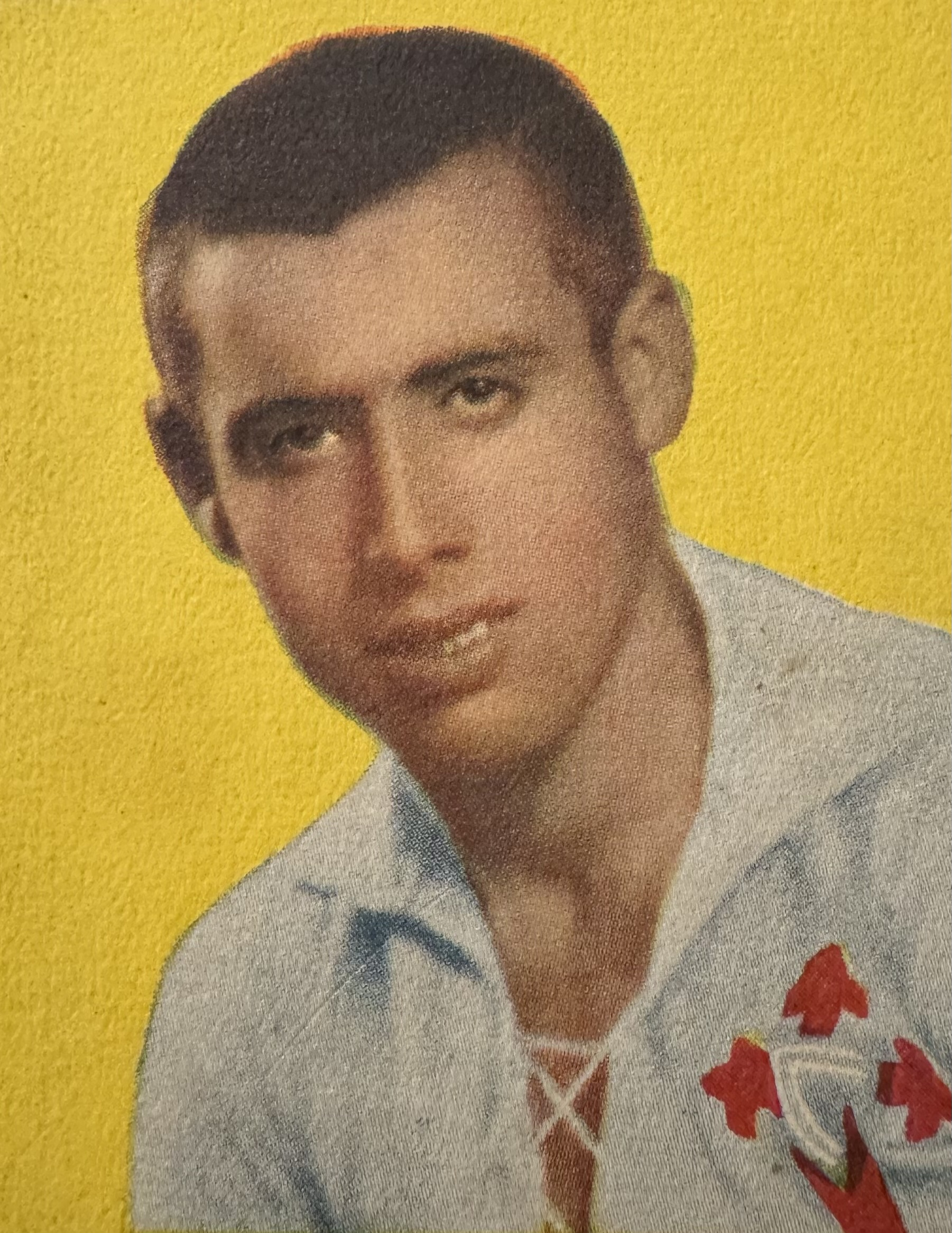
Pahiño scored ten hat-tricks.

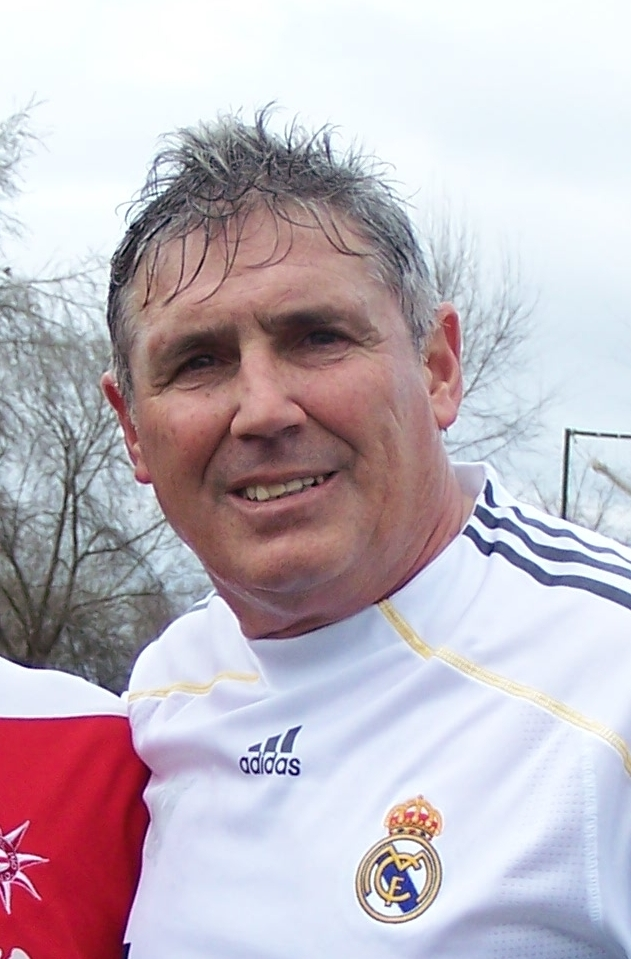
Santillana scored seven hat-tricks.

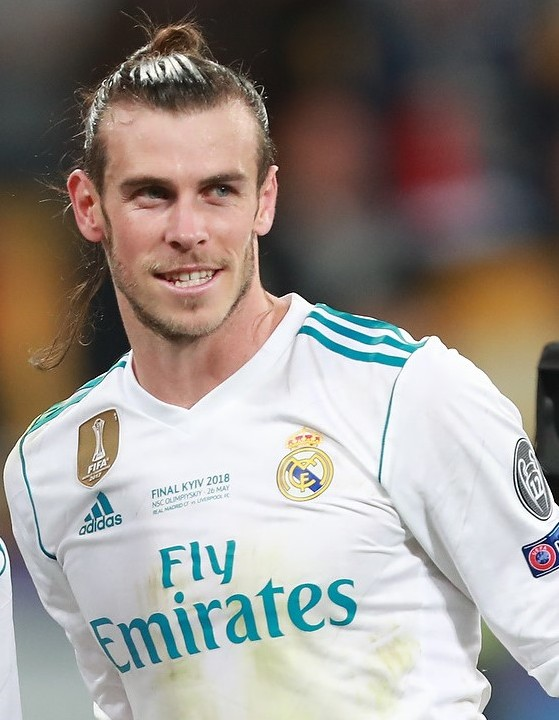
Gareth Bale scored four hat-tricks.

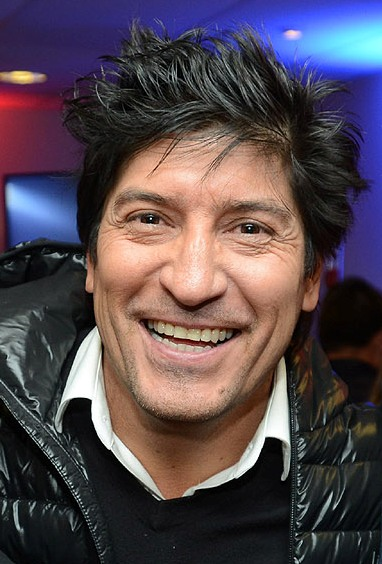
Iván Zamorano scored two hat-tricks, including a notable one in Real's 5–0 win against Barcelona in 1995.

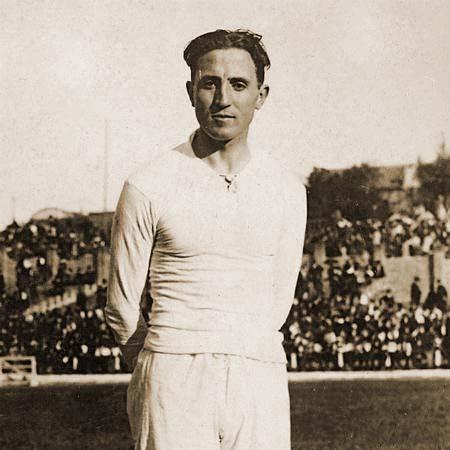
Santiago Bernabéu scored three hat-tricks, including two hat-tricks against Barcelona in 1916.

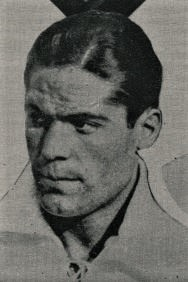
Gaspar Rubio scored four hat-tricks.

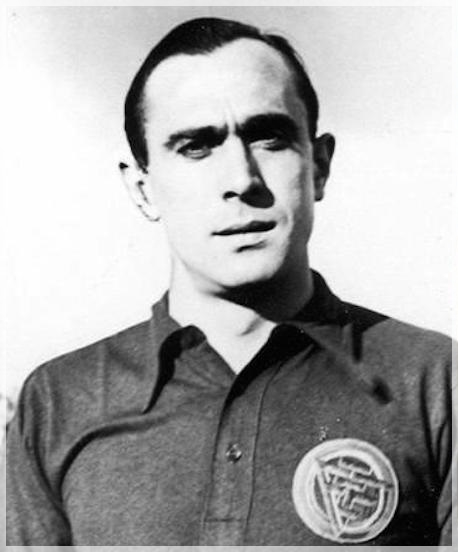
Luis Regueiro scored three hat-tricks.

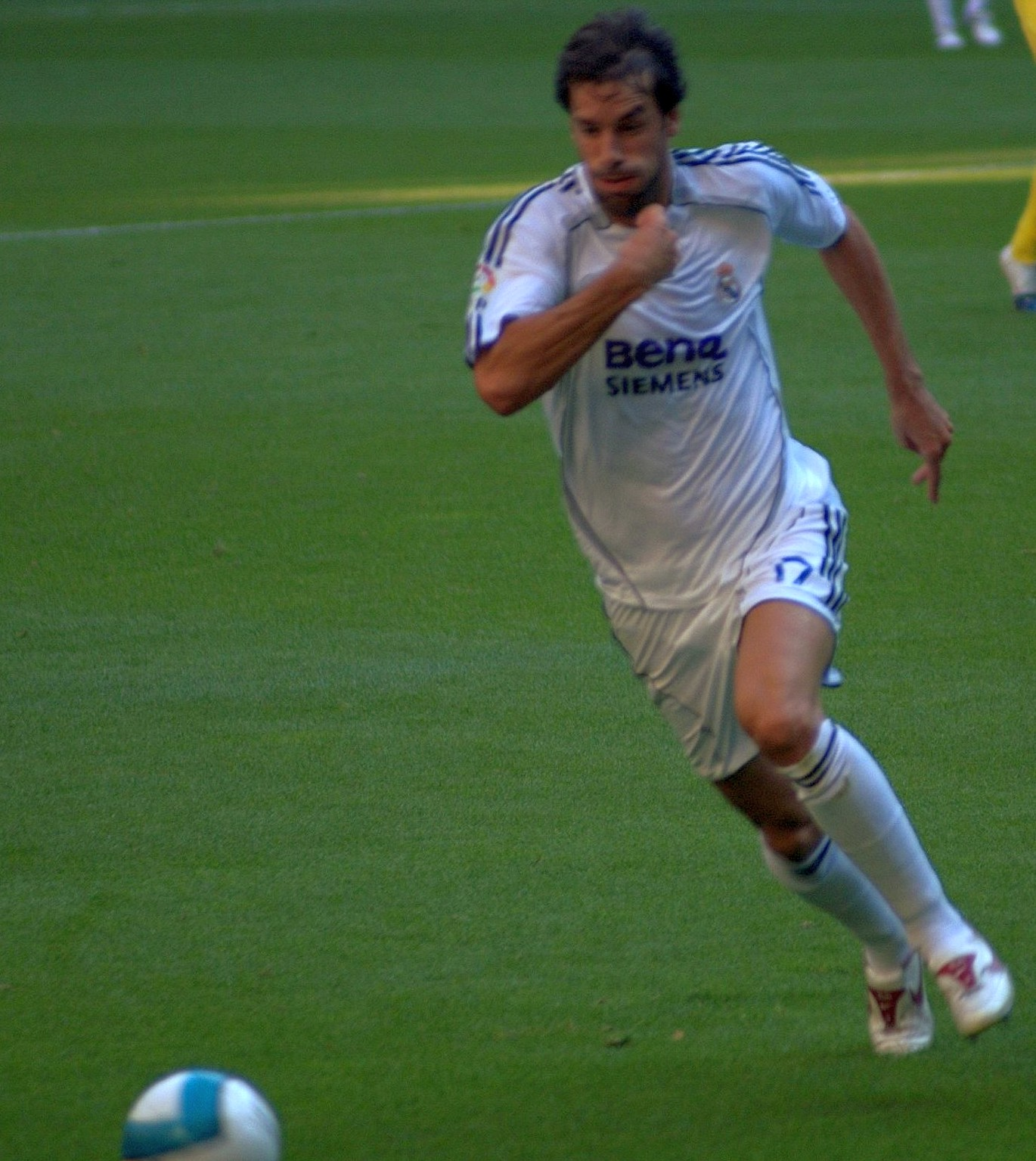
Ruud van Nistelrooy scored two hat-tricks, including three goals against Levante in his second official match for Real Madrid.

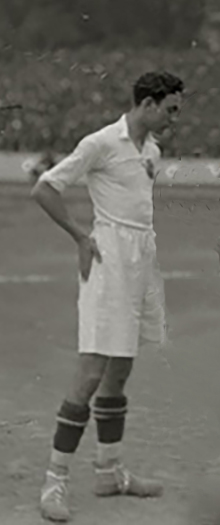
Juan Monjardín scored three hat-tricks.

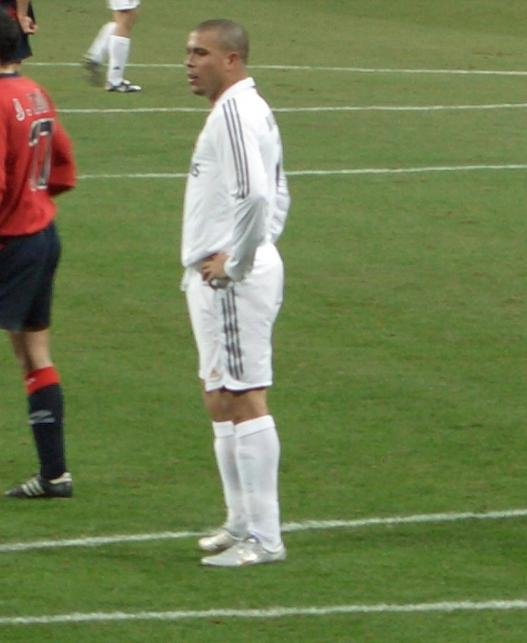
Ronaldo scored two hat-tricks, including a notable one against Manchester United at Old Trafford in 2003.

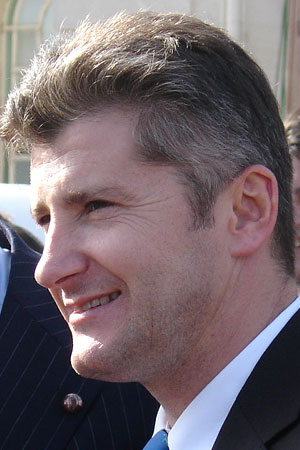
Davor Šuker scored three hat-tricks in 1996–97 season.

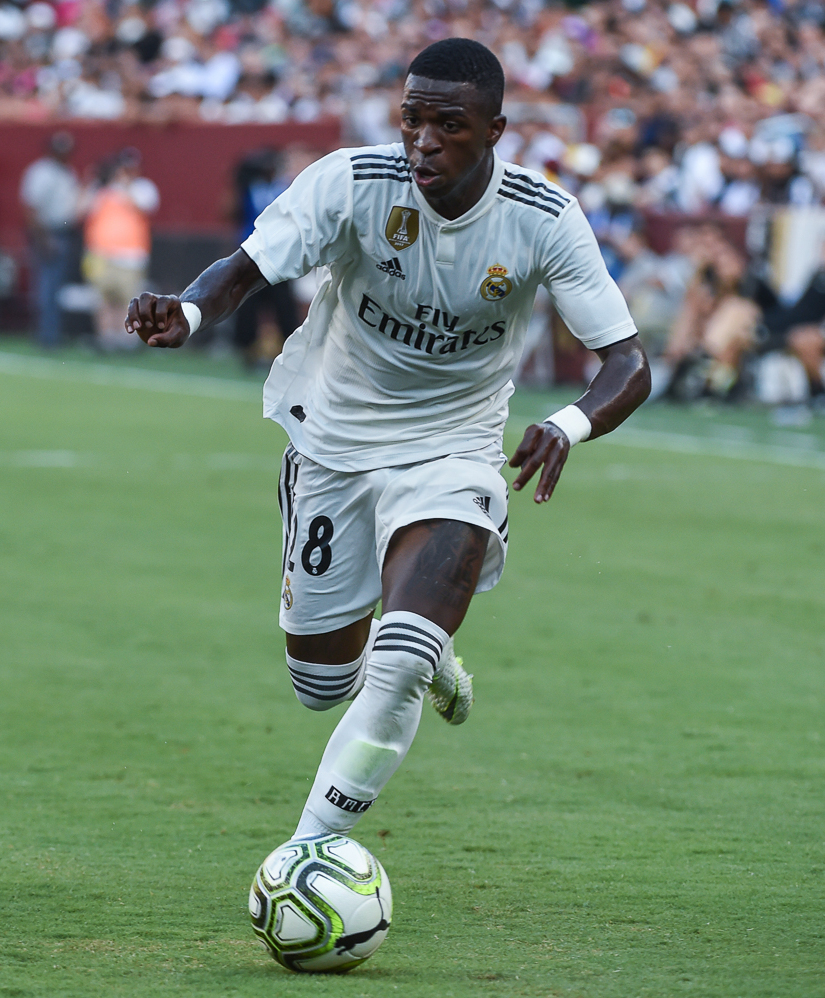
Vinícius Júnior scored four hat-tricks, including 2024 Supercopa de España final against Barcelona.

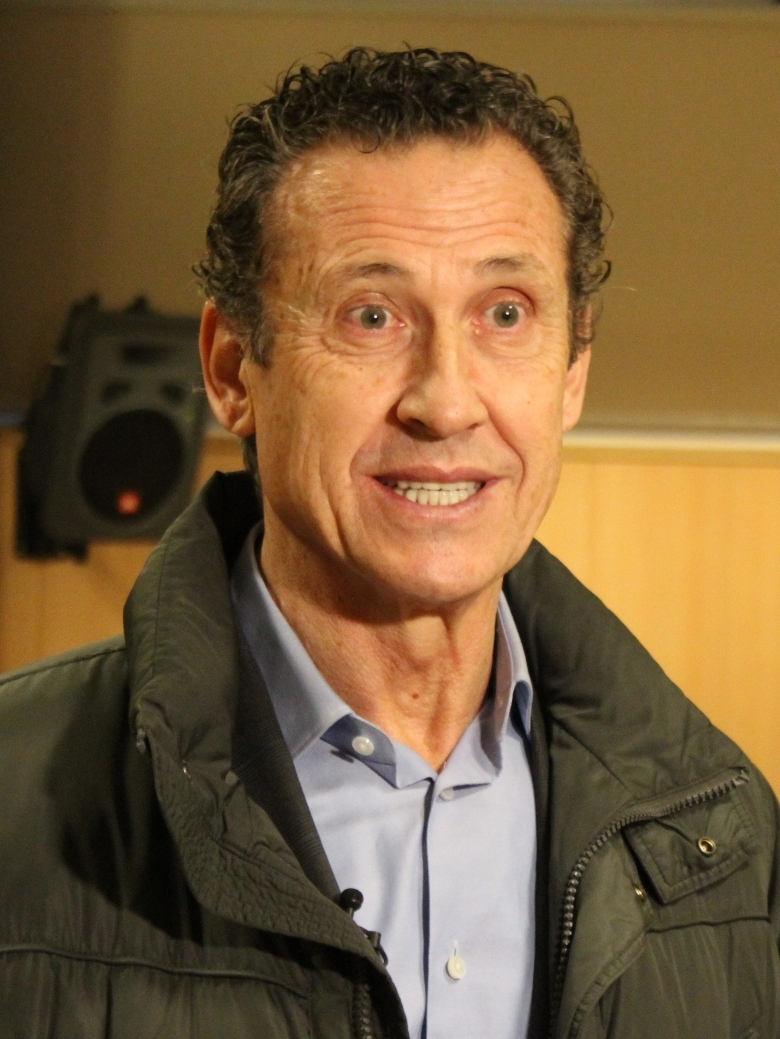
Jorge Valdano scored three hat-tricks.

The Result column shows the Real Madrid score first.

As of 26 August 2026

Key
(X)	Number of times player scored a hat-trick (only for players with multiple hat-tricks)
4	Player scored four goals
5	Player scored five goals
6	Player scored six goals
	Real Madrid lost the match
	Real Madrid drew the match
¤	Away matches
~	Matches at neutral venues

#	Player	G	Against	Res.	Date	Competition	Ref.
1	(Spain) Antonio Neyra	3	Hamilton	5–0	28 March 1907	Copa del Rey	
2	(Spain) Santiago Bernabéu	3	Barcelona	4–1	2 April 1916	Copa del Rey	
3	(Spain) Luis Belaunde	3	Barcelona	6–6~	13 April 1916	Copa del Rey	
4	(Spain) Santiago Bernabéu (2)	3	Barcelona	6–6~	13 April 1916	Copa del Rey	
5	(Spain) Santiago Bernabéu (3)	3	Sevilla	8–1	11 March 1917	Copa del Rey	
6	(Spain) Juan Monjardín	3	Arenas	5–2	19 March 1922	Copa del Rey	
7	(Spain) Juan Monjardín (2)	3	Arenas	3–0	29 March 1922	Copa del Rey	
8	(Spain) Juan Monjardín (3)	4	Real Murcia	6–2	7 March 1926	Copa del Rey	
9	(Spain) Benguria	5	Extremeño	9–4	6 March 1927	Copa del Rey	
10	(Spain) Uribe	3	Europa	8–1~	1 May 1927	Copa del Rey	
11	(Spain) Francisco Moraleda	3	Europa	8–1~	1 May 1927	Copa del Rey	
12	(Spain) José Muñagorri	3	Patria	7–0	31 January 1928	Copa del Rey	
13	(Spain) Uribe (2)	3	RSG Torrelavega	6–1	5 February 1928	Copa del Rey	
14	(Spain) Gaspar Rubio	3	Real Oviedo	4–2¤	16 December 1928	Copa del Rey	
15	(Spain) Rafael Morera	3	Logroñés	8–0	23 December 1928	Copa del Rey	
16	(Spain) Uribe (3)	3	Racing Madrid	6–2¤	12 January 1929	Copa del Rey	
17	(Spain) Jaime Lazcano	4	Europa	5–0	10 February 1929	La Liga	
18	(Spain) Gaspar Rubio (2)	3	Atlético Madrid	4–1	16 February 1930	La Liga	
19	(Spain) Jaime Lazcano (2)	3	Barcelona	5–1	30 March 1930	La Liga	
20	(Spain) Gaspar Rubio (3)	3	Patria Aragón	6–1	15 April 1930	Copa del Rey	
21	(Spain) Gaspar Rubio (4)	3	Valencia	5–2¤	4 May 1930	Copa del Rey	
22	(Spain) Manuel Olivares	3	Donostia	6–2	4 December 1932	La Liga	
23	(Spain) Luis Regueiro	3	Arenas	8–2	19 March 1933	La Liga	
24	(Spain) Manuel Olivares (2)	4	Unión Irún	9–0	14 May 1933	Copa del Rey	
25	(Spain) Luis Regueiro (2)	4	Sporting Gijón	8–0	28 May 1933	Copa del Rey	
26	(Spain) Eugenio Hilario	3	Espanyol	3–2	31 December 1933	La Liga	
27	(Spain) Fernando Sañudo	4	Espanyol	7–2	30 December 1934	La Liga	
28	(Spain) Fernando Sañudo (2)	4	Barcelona	8–2	3 February 1935	La Liga	
29	(Spain) Jaime Lazcano (3)	3	Barcelona	8–2	3 February 1935	La Liga	
30	(Spain) Fernando Sañudo (3)	4	Arenas	6–1	28 April 1935	La Liga	
31	(Hungary) Vilmos Kelemen	3	Espanyol	6–0	17 November 1935	La Liga	
32	(Spain) Fernando Sañudo (4)	3	Valencia	4–1	1 December 1935	La Liga	
33	(Spain) Fernando Sañudo (5)	3	Osasuna	6–2	5 January 1936	La Liga	
34	(Spain) Fernando Sañudo (6)	3	Real Betis	5–1	26 January 1936	La Liga	
35	(Hungary) Vilmos Kelemen (2)	3	Racing Santander	3–4¤	15 March 1936	La Liga	
36	(Spain) Luis Regueiro (3)	3	Osasuna	4–1¤	5 April 1936	La Liga	
37	(Spain) Fernando Sañudo (7)	3	Hércules	7–0	7 June 1936	Copa del Rey	
38	(Spain) Manuel Alday	3	Real Murcia	4–0	12 May 1940	Copa del Rey	
39	(Spain) Manuel Alday (2)	3	Hércules	5–3	6 October 1940	La Liga	
40	(Spain) Manuel Alday (3)	3	Valencia	6–1	8 December 1940	La Liga	
41	(Spain) Manuel Alday (4)	3	Real Zaragoza	6–0	15 December 1940	La Liga	
42	(Spain) Chus Alonso	3	Sevilla	4–5¤	9 February 1941	La Liga	
43	(Spain) Marcial Arbiza	3	Granada	5–2	5 October 1941	La Liga	
44	(Spain) Manuel Alday (5)	4	Castellón	9–1	16 November 1941	La Liga	
45	(Spain) Manuel Alday (6)	3	Valencia	5–3	21 December 1941	La Liga	
46	(Spain) Manuel Alday (7)	3	Real Sociedad	6–4	4 January 1942	La Liga	
47	(Spain) Marcial Arbiza (2)	3	Ferroviaria	4–1	3 May 1942	Copa del Rey	
48	(Spain) Manuel Alday (8)	3	Deportivo La Coruña	4–3	17 January 1943	La Liga	
49	(Spain) Manuel Alday (9)	5	Espanyol	7–0	28 February 1943	La Liga	
50	(Spain) Sabino Barinaga	4	Barcelona	11–1	13 June 1943	Copa del Rey	
51	(Spain) Pruden	3	Barcelona	11–1	13 June 1943	Copa del Rey	
52	(Spain) Sabino Barinaga (2)	3	Sevilla	3–5	3 October 1943	La Liga	
53	(Spain) Sabino Barinaga (3)	3	Sabadell	3–1¤	28 November 1943	La Liga	
54	(Spain) Chus Alonso (2)	3	Granada	6–2	8 April 1945	La Liga	
55	(Spain) Sabino Barinaga (4)	3	Real Murcia	5–3¤	13 May 1945	La Liga	
56	(Spain) Pruden (2)	3	Celta Vigo	6–0	31 March 1946	La Liga	
57	(Spain) Pruden (3)	3	Real Murcia	5–0	29 September 1946	La Liga	
58	(Spain) Pruden (4)	3	Sporting Gijón	4–0	3 November 1946	La Liga	
59	(Spain) Pruden (5)	3	Castellón	7–4	2 February 1947	La Liga	
60	(Spain) Pruden (6)	3	Racing Ferrol	4–2	27 April 1947	Copa del Rey	
61	(Spain) Sabino Barinaga (5)	3	Real Betis	6–0	11 May 1947	Copa del Rey	
62	(Spain) Juan Gallardo	3	Sabadell	4–0	18 January 1948	La Liga	
63	(Spain) José Montalvo	3	Sevilla	5–1¤	24 October 1948	La Liga	
64	(Spain) Pablo Olmedo	4	Celta Vigo	6–0	14 November 1948	La Liga	
65	(Spain) Pahiño	3	Sabadell	5–1	12 December 1948	La Liga	
66	(Spain) Pahiño (2)	3	Barcelona	6–1	18 September 1949	La Liga	
67	(Spain) Miguel Cabrera	3	Real Oviedo	6–2	2 October 1949	La Liga	
68	(Spain) Pahiño (3)	4	Gimnàstic Tarragona	5–1	16 April 1950	La Liga	
69	(Spain) Macala	3	Gimnàstic Tarragona	7–1¤	7 May 1950	Copa del Rey	
70	(Spain) Sabino Barinaga (6)	3	Gimnàstic Tarragona	7–1¤	7 May 1950	Copa del Rey	
71	(Spain) Pahiño (4)	3	Espanyol	6–2	10 September 1950	La Liga	
72	(Spain) Jesús Narro	4	Lleida	6–1¤	8 October 1950	La Liga	
73	(Spain) Pahiño (5)	3	Alcoyano	7–0	15 October 1950	La Liga	
74	(Spain) Jesús Narro (2)	3	Alcoyano	7–0	15 October 1950	La Liga	
75	(Spain) Pahiño (6)	4	Real Sociedad	7–2	7 January 1951	La Liga	
76	(Spain) Jesús Narro (3)	3	Barcelona	4–1	14 January 1951	La Liga	
77	(Spain) Miguel Muñoz	5	Lleida	7–0	30 January 1951	La Liga	
78	(Argentina) Roque Olsen	3	Real Murcia	6–0	25 March 1951	La Liga	
79	(Spain) Pahiño (7)	3	Las Palmas	4–1¤	9 September 1951	La Liga	
80	(Spain) Pahiño (8)	4	Espanyol	6–1	13 January 1952	La Liga	
81	(Spain) Pahiño (9)	3	Celta Vigo	3–2¤	17 April 1952	Copa del Rey	
82	(Spain) Pahiño (10)	3	Real Sociedad	4–0	31 May 1953	Copa del Rey	
83	(Argentina) Alfredo Di Stéfano	3	Atlético Madrid	4–3¤	1 November 1953	La Liga	
84	(Spain) Luis Molowny	3	Espanyol	4–3	27 December 1953	La Liga	
85	(Argentina) Alfredo Di Stéfano (2)	3	Sporting Gijón	4–0	4 April 1954	La Liga	
86	(Argentina) Alfredo Di Stéfano (3)	3	Valencia	4–0	18 April 1954	La Liga	
87	(Argentina) Alfredo Di Stéfano (4)	3	Las Palmas	7–0	26 September 1954	La Liga	
88	(Spain) Pérez-Payá	3	Deportivo La Coruña	5–1	5 December 1954	La Liga	
89	(Argentina) Héctor Rial	3	Sevilla	3–1	30 January 1955	La Liga	
90	(Argentina) Alfredo Di Stéfano (5)	4	Espanyol	5–1	27 February 1955	La Liga	
91	(Argentina) Alfredo Di Stéfano (6)	4	Espanyol	7–1	9 February 1956	La Liga	
92	(Spain) Ramón Marsal	3	Real Murcia	7–1	26 February 1956	La Liga	
93	(Argentina) Alfredo Di Stéfano (7)	3	Las Palmas	6–0	15 April 1956	La Liga	
94	(Argentina) Alfredo Di Stéfano (8)	3	Condal	6–0	9 September 1956	La Liga	
95	(Argentina) Alfredo Di Stéfano (9)	3	Real Zaragoza	3–3	16 December 1956	La Liga	
96	(Spain) Joseíto	3	Espanyol	7–2	6 January 1957	La Liga	
97	(Argentina) Alfredo Di Stéfano (10)	4	Las Palmas	5–1¤	7 April 1957	La Liga	
98	(Argentina) Alfredo Di Stéfano (11)	3	Celta Vigo	4–1	21 April 1957	La Liga	
99	(Spain) Paco Gento	3	Milan	5–1	20 June 1957	Latin Cup	
100	(Argentina) Alfredo Di Stéfano (12)	3	Sevilla	6–0	29 September 1957	La Liga	
101	(Argentina) Héctor Rial (2)	3	Royal Antwerp	6–0	28 November 1957	European Cup	
102	(Argentina) Alfredo Di Stéfano (13)	4	Sevilla	8–0	23 January 1958	European Cup	
103	(Argentina) Alfredo Di Stéfano (14)	3	Valladolid	5–3	29 March 1958	La Liga	
104	(Argentina) Alfredo Di Stéfano (15)	3	Vasas	4–0	2 April 1958	European Cup	
105	(Spain) Ramón Marsal (2)	3	Espanyol	4–2¤	6 April 1958	La Liga	
106	(Argentina) Alfredo Di Stéfano (16)	3	Celta Vigo	5–0	20 April 1958	La Liga	
107	(Argentina) Alfredo Di Stéfano (17)	4	Valladolid	5–1	1 June 1958	Copa del Rey	
108	(Hungary) Ferenc Puskás	3	Sporting Gijón	5–1	21 September 1958	La Liga	
109	(Argentina) Alfredo Di Stéfano (18)	3	Celta Vigo	4–2¤	28 September 1958	La Liga	
110	(Argentina) Alfredo Di Stéfano (19)	3	Osasuna	8–0	5 October 1958	La Liga	
111	(Argentina) Alfredo Di Stéfano (20)	3	Las Palmas	10–1	4 January 1959	La Liga	
112	(Hungary) Ferenc Puskás (2)	3	Las Palmas	10–1	4 January 1959	La Liga	
113	(Hungary) Ferenc Puskás (3)	3	Real Oviedo	4–0	8 March 1959	La Liga	
114	(Argentina) Alfredo Di Stéfano (21)	4	Wiener SC	7–1	18 March 1959	European Cup	
115	(Hungary) Ferenc Puskás (4)	3	Granada	3–0¤	29 March 1959	La Liga	
116	(Argentina) Alfredo Di Stéfano (22)	3	Sevilla	8–0	5 April 1959	La Liga	
117	(Hungary) Ferenc Puskás (5)	3	Jeunesse Esch	7–0	21 October 1959	European Cup	
118	(Spain) Pepillo	5	Elche	11–2	7 February 1960	La Liga	
119	(Hungary) Ferenc Puskás (6)	4	Elche	11–2	7 February 1960	La Liga	
120	(Spain) Pepillo (2)	3	Real Sociedad	4–0	10 April 1960	La Liga	
121	(Hungary) Ferenc Puskás (7)	4	Cultural Leonesa	5–0	8 May 1960	Copa del Rey	
122	(Hungary) Ferenc Puskás (8)	4	Eintracht Frankfurt	7–3	18 May 1960	European Cup	
123	(Argentina) Alfredo Di Stéfano (23)	3	Eintracht Frankfurt	7–3	18 May 1960	European Cup	
124	(Hungary) Ferenc Puskás (9)	3	Sporting Gijón	8–0	5 June 1960	Copa del Rey	
125	(Spain) Pepillo (3)	4	Sporting Gijón	5–1¤	12 June 1960	Copa del Rey	
126	(Hungary) Ferenc Puskás (10)	3	Athletic Bilbao	8–1	19 June 1960	Copa del Rey	
127	(Hungary) Ferenc Puskás (11)	3	Real Zaragoza	5–1	13 November 1960	La Liga	
128	(Spain) Luis del Sol	3	Real Oviedo	7–0	27 November 1960	La Liga	
129	(Hungary) Ferenc Puskás (12)	4	Elche	8–0	22 January 1961	La Liga	
130	(Argentina) Alfredo Di Stéfano (24)	4	Granada	5–0	19 February 1961	La Liga	
131	(Hungary) Ferenc Puskás (13)	3	Real Betis	4–0	23 April 1961	La Liga	
132	(Hungary) Ferenc Puskás (14)	6	Real Betis	7–1	18 June 1961	Copa del Rey	
133	(Argentina) Alfredo Di Stéfano (25)	3	Boldklubben 1913	9–0	25 October 1961	European Cup	
134	(Hungary) Ferenc Puskás (15)	3	Racing Santander	6–0	31 December 1961	La Liga	
135	(Hungary) Ferenc Puskás (16)	4	Elche	5–1	8 April 1962	Copa del Rey	
136	(Hungary) Ferenc Puskás (17)	3	Benfica	3–5~	2 May 1962	European Cup	
137	(Hungary) Ferenc Puskás (18)	3	Real Betis	5–2¤	16 September 1962	La Liga	
138	(Argentina) Alfredo Di Stéfano (26)	3	Elche	6–1	14 October 1962	La Liga	
139	(Hungary) Ferenc Puskás (19)	3	Barcelona	5–1¤	27 January 1963	La Liga	
140	(Argentina) Alfredo Di Stéfano (27)	3	Córdoba	5–2	5 October 1963	La Liga	
141	(Hungary) Ferenc Puskás (20)	3	Rangers	6–0	9 October 1963	European Cup	
142	(Hungary) Ferenc Puskás (21)	3	Barcelona	4–0	15 December 1963	La Liga	
143	(Argentina) Alfredo Di Stéfano (28)	3	Real Murcia	4–1	15 March 1964	La Liga	
144	(Czechoslovakia) Yanko Daucik	3	Indauchu	7–0	3 May 1964	Copa del Rey	
145	(Spain) Paco Gento (2)	3	Boldklubben 1909	5–2¤	23 September 1964	European Cup	
146	(Spain) Ramón Grosso	3	Córdoba	6–1	27 September 1964	La Liga	
147	(Spain) Amancio	3	Barcelona	4–1	8 November 1964	La Liga	
148	(Spain) Amancio (2)	3	Dukla Prague	4–0	18 November 1964	European Cup	
149	(Spain) Ramón Grosso (2)	3	Sevilla	4–0	27 December 1964	La Liga	
150	(Hungary) Ferenc Puskás (22)	4	Mestalla	6–0	16 May 1965	Copa del Rey	
151	(Hungary) Ferenc Puskás (23)	4	Feyenoord	5–0	22 September 1965	European Cup	
152	(Spain) Manuel Velázquez	3	Real Sociedad	9–1	16 September 1967	La Liga	
153	(Spain) Amancio (3)	3	Sparta Prague	3–0	6 March 1968	European Cup	
154	(Spain) Amancio (4)	3	Espanyol	3–0	15 September 1968	La Liga	
155	(Spain) Pirri	3	AEL Limassol	6–0	18 September 1968	European Cup	
156	(Spain) Amancio (5)	3	Pontevedra	3–1¤	12 October 1969	La Liga	
157	(Spain) Amancio (6)	3	Las Palmas	5–0	11 January 1970	La Liga	
158	(Spain) Juan Planelles	3	Hibernians	5–0	30 September 1970	European Cup Winners' Cup	
159	(Spain) Pirri (2)	3	Granada	4–2	12 December 1971	La Liga	
160	(Spain) Pirri (3)	3	San Andrés	5–1	10 June 1972	Copa del Rey	
161	(Argentina) Oscar Más	3	Celta Vigo	6–1	21 April 1974	La Liga	
162	(Spain) Santillana	3	Real Betis	7–1	1 June 1974	Copa del Rey	
163	(Spain) Pirri (4)	3	Celta Vigo	3–3¤	3 November 1974	La Liga	
164	(Spain) Santillana (2)	3	Celta Vigo	4–1	15 March 1975	La Liga	
165	(Spain) Santillana (3)	3	Las Palmas	5–0	14 June 1975	Copa del Rey	
166	(Spain) Pirri (5)	3	Elche	5–2	28 November 1976	La Liga	
167	(West Germany) Uli Stielike	3	Hércules	3–0	30 April 1978	La Liga	
168	(Spain) Juanito	3	Las Palmas	3–1	13 January 1980	La Liga	
169	(Spain) García Hernández	3	Athletic Bilbao	7–1	14 September 1980	La Liga	
170	(Spain) Juanito (2)	3	Salamanca	3–1¤	4 April 1981	La Liga	
171	(Spain) Santillana (4)	3	Racing Santander	5–1	24 October 1982	La Liga	
172	(Spain) Isidro Díaz	3	Real Sociedad	4–0	21 November 1982	La Liga	
173	(Spain) Santillana (5)	3	Sporting Gijón	6–0	4 May 1983	Copa del Rey	
174	(Spain) Santillana (6)	4	Real Zaragoza	5–3	22 June 1983	Copa de la Liga	
175	(Spain) Francisco Pineda	3	Badajoz	7–1	19 October 1983	Copa del Rey	
176	(Argentina) Jorge Valdano	3	Espanyol	4–1	4 November 1984	La Liga	
177	(Spain) Emilio Butragueño	3	Anderlecht	6–1	12 December 1984	UEFA Cup	
178	(Argentina) Jorge Valdano (2)	3	Elche	6–1	20 February 1985	La Liga	
179	(Spain) Emilio Butragueño (2)	3	Real Murcia	5–0	24 March 1985	La Liga	
180	(Spain) Míchel	3	Valencia	5–0	4 September 1985	La Liga	
181	(Argentina) Jorge Valdano (3)	3	Cádiz	3–1	17 November 1985	La Liga	
182	(Spain) Santillana (7)	3	Celta Vigo	4–0	26 February 1986	Copa del Rey	
183	(Mexico) Hugo Sánchez	3	Real Betis	6–2¤	21 September 1986	La Liga	
184	(Mexico) Hugo Sánchez (2)	3	Sporting Gijón	4–0	30 May 1987	La Liga	
185	(Mexico) Hugo Sánchez (3)	3	Sporting Gijón	7–0	6 September 1987	La Liga	
186	(Mexico) Hugo Sánchez (4)	3	Espanyol	4–1¤	31 December 1988	La Liga	
187	(Spain) Míchel (2)	3	Sporting Gijón	5–1	12 February 1989	La Liga	
188	(Mexico) Hugo Sánchez (5)	3	Logroñés	5–1¤	17 December 1989	La Liga	
189	(Mexico) Hugo Sánchez (6)	3	Castellón	7–0	28 January 1990	La Liga	
190	(Mexico) Hugo Sánchez (7)	3	Real Oviedo	5–2	5 May 1990	La Liga	
191	(Spain) Sebastián Losada	3	Odense	6–0	2 October 1990	European Cup	
192	(Spain) Emilio Butragueño (3)	3	Swarovski Tirol	9–1	24 October 1990	European Cup	
193	(Mexico) Hugo Sánchez (8)	4	Swarovski Tirol	9–1	24 October 1990	European Cup	
194	(Spain) Fernando Hierro	3	Espanyol	5–1¤	1 December 1991	La Liga	
195	(Romania) Gheorghe Hagi	3	Athletic Bilbao	5–0	16 February 1992	La Liga	
196	(Spain) Fernando Hierro (2)	4	Espanyol	7–0	19 April 1992	La Liga	
197	(Spain) Fernando Hierro (3)	3	Torpedo Moscow	5–2	21 October 1992	UEFA Cup	
198	(Chile) Iván Zamorano	3	Sevilla	5–0	23 May 1993	La Liga	
199	(Chile) Iván Zamorano (2)	3	Barcelona	5–0	7 January 1995	La Liga	
200	(Spain) Raúl	3	Ferencváros	6–1	18 October 1995	UEFA Champions League	
201	(Croatia) Davor Šuker	3	Real Sociedad	6–1	19 October 1996	La Liga	
202	(Croatia) Davor Šuker (2)	3	Valencia	4–2	24 November 1996	La Liga	
203	(Croatia) Davor Šuker (3)	3	Real Oviedo	6–1	23 February 1997	La Liga	
204	(Spain) Raúl (2)	3	Valladolid	3–2	7 February 1999	La Liga	
205	(Spain) Guti	3	Villarreal	4–0	14 April 2001	La Liga	
206	(Spain) Raúl (3)	3	Real Zaragoza	3–0	22 August 2001	Supercopa de España	
207	(Spain) Guti (2)	3	Pájara-Playas	4–0¤	10 October 2001	Copa del Rey	
208	(Spain) Raúl (4)	3	Gimnàstic Tarragona	4–2	18 December 2001	Copa del Rey	
209	(Spain) Fernando Morientes	5	Las Palmas	7–0	10 February 2002	La Liga	
210	(Spain) Fernando Hierro (4)	3	Real Zaragoza	3–1	24 March 2002	La Liga	
211	(Spain) Tote	3	San Sebastián	8–1¤	11 September 2002	Copa del Rey	
212	(Spain) Javier Portillo	3	San Sebastián	8–1¤	11 September 2002	Copa del Rey	
213	(Brazil) Ronaldo	3	Alavés	5–1¤	1 March 2003	La Liga	
214	(Brazil) Ronaldo (2)	3	Manchester United	3–4¤	23 April 2003	UEFA Champions League	
215	(Spain) Raúl (5)	3	Valladolid	7–2	13 September 2003	La Liga	
216	(France) Zinedine Zidane	3	Sevilla	4–2	15 January 2006	La Liga	
217	(Netherlands) Ruud van Nistelrooy	3	Levante	4–1¤	10 September 2006	La Liga	
218	(Netherlands) Ruud van Nistelrooy (2)	4	Osasuna	4–1¤	12 November 2006	La Liga	
219	(Netherlands) Rafael van der Vaart	3	Sporting Gijón	7–1	24 September 2008	La Liga	
220	(Argentina) Gonzalo Higuaín	4	Málaga	4–3	8 November 2008	La Liga	
221	(Spain) Raúl (6)	3	Real Unión	4–3	11 November 2008	Copa del Rey	
222	(Spain) Raúl (7)	3	Sevilla	4–2¤	26 April 2009	La Liga	
223	(Argentina) Gonzalo Higuaín (2)	3	Valladolid	4–1¤	14 March 2010	La Liga	
224	(Portugal) Cristiano Ronaldo	3	Mallorca	4–1¤	5 May 2010	La Liga	
225	(Portugal) Cristiano Ronaldo (2)	4	Racing Santander	6–1	23 October 2010	La Liga	
226	(Portugal) Cristiano Ronaldo (3)	3	Athletic Bilbao	6–1	20 November 2010	La Liga	
227	(France) Karim Benzema	3	Auxerre	4–0	18 December 2010	UEFA Champions League	
228	(France) Karim Benzema (2)	3	Levante	8–0	22 December 2010	Copa del Rey	
229	(Portugal) Cristiano Ronaldo (4)	3	Levante	8–0	22 December 2010	Copa del Rey	
230	(Portugal) Cristiano Ronaldo (5)	3	Villarreal	4–2	9 January 2011	Copa del Rey	
231	(Portugal) Cristiano Ronaldo (6)	3	Málaga	7–0	3 March 2011	La Liga	
232	(Argentina) Gonzalo Higuaín (3)	3	Valencia	6–3¤	23 April 2011	La Liga	
233	(Portugal) Cristiano Ronaldo (7)	4	Sevilla	6–2¤	7 May 2011	La Liga	
234	(Portugal) Cristiano Ronaldo (8)	3	Getafe	4–0	10 May 2011	La Liga	
235	(Togo) Emmanuel Adebayor	3	Almería	8–1	21 May 2011	La Liga	
236	(Portugal) Cristiano Ronaldo (9)	3	Real Zaragoza	6–0¤	28 August 2011	La Liga	
237	(Portugal) Cristiano Ronaldo (10)	3	Rayo Vallecano	6–2	24 September 2011	La Liga	
238	(Argentina) Gonzalo Higuaín (4)	3	Espanyol	4–0¤	2 October 2011	La Liga	
239	(Argentina) Gonzalo Higuaín (5)	3	Real Betis	4–1	15 October 2011	La Liga	
240	(Portugal) Cristiano Ronaldo (11)	3	Málaga	4–0¤	22 October 2011	La Liga	
241	(Portugal) Cristiano Ronaldo (12)	3	Osasuna	7–1	6 November 2011	La Liga	
242	(Portugal) Cristiano Ronaldo (13)	3	Sevilla	6–2¤	17 December 2011	La Liga	
243	(Portugal) Cristiano Ronaldo (14)	3	Levante	4–2	12 February 2012	La Liga	
244	(Portugal) Cristiano Ronaldo (15)	3	Atlético Madrid	4–1¤	11 April 2012	La Liga	
245	(Portugal) Cristiano Ronaldo (16)	3	Deportivo La Coruña	5–1	20 September 2012	La Liga	
246	(Portugal) Cristiano Ronaldo (17)	3	Ajax	4–1¤	3 October 2012	UEFA Champions League	
247	(Portugal) Cristiano Ronaldo (18)	3	Celta Vigo	4–0	9 January 2013	Copa del Rey	
248	(Portugal) Cristiano Ronaldo (19)	3	Getafe	4–0	27 January 2013	La Liga	
249	(Portugal) Cristiano Ronaldo (20)	3	Sevilla	4–1	9 February 2013	La Liga	
250	(Portugal) Cristiano Ronaldo (21)	3	Galatasaray	6–1¤	17 September 2013	UEFA Champions League	
251	(Portugal) Cristiano Ronaldo (22)	3	Sevilla	7–3	30 October 2013	La Liga	
252	(Portugal) Cristiano Ronaldo (23)	3	Real Sociedad	5–1	9 November 2013	La Liga	
253	(Wales) Gareth Bale	3	Valladolid	4–0	30 November 2013	La Liga	
254	(Portugal) Cristiano Ronaldo (24)	3	Deportivo La Coruña	8–2¤	20 September 2014	La Liga	
255	(Portugal) Cristiano Ronaldo (25)	4	Elche	5–1	23 September 2014	La Liga	
256	(Portugal) Cristiano Ronaldo (26)	3	Athletic Bilbao	5–0	23 September 2014	La Liga	
257	(Portugal) Cristiano Ronaldo (27)	3	Celta Vigo	3–0	6 December 2014	La Liga	
258	(Portugal) Cristiano Ronaldo (28)	5	Granada	9–1	5 April 2015	La Liga	
259	(Portugal) Cristiano Ronaldo (29)	3	Sevilla	3–2¤	2 May 2015	La Liga	
260	(Portugal) Cristiano Ronaldo (30)	3	Espanyol	4–1¤	17 May 2015	La Liga	
261	(Portugal) Cristiano Ronaldo (31)	3	Getafe	7–3	23 May 2015	La Liga	
262	(Portugal) Cristiano Ronaldo (32)	5	Espanyol	6–0¤	12 September 2015	La Liga	
263	(Portugal) Cristiano Ronaldo (33)	3	Shakhtar Donetsk	4–0	15 September 2015	UEFA Champions League	
264	(Portugal) Cristiano Ronaldo (34)	4	Malmö	8–0	8 December 2015	UEFA Champions League	
265	(France) Karim Benzema (3)	3	Malmö	8–0	8 December 2015	UEFA Champions League	
266	(Wales) Gareth Bale (2)	4	Rayo Vallecano	10–2	20 December 2015	La Liga	
267	(France) Karim Benzema (4)	3	Rayo Vallecano	10–2	20 December 2015	La Liga	
268	(Wales) Gareth Bale (3)	3	Deportivo La Coruña	5–0	9 January 2016	La Liga	
269	(Portugal) Cristiano Ronaldo (35)	3	Espanyol	6–0	31 January 2016	La Liga	
270	(Portugal) Cristiano Ronaldo (36)	4	Celta Vigo	7–1	5 March 2016	La Liga	
271	(Portugal) Cristiano Ronaldo (37)	3	Wolfsburg	3–0	12 April 2016	UEFA Champions League	
272	(Portugal) Cristiano Ronaldo (38)	3	Alavés	4–1¤	29 October 2016	La Liga	
273	(Portugal) Cristiano Ronaldo (39)	3	Atlético Madrid	3–0¤	19 November 2016	La Liga	
274	(Dominican Republic) Mariano Díaz	3	Cultural Leonesa	6–1	30 November 2016	Copa del Rey	
275	(Portugal) Cristiano Ronaldo (40)	3	Kashima Antlers	4–2~	18 December 2016	FIFA Club World Cup	
276	(Portugal) Cristiano Ronaldo (41)	3	Bayern Munich	4–2	18 April 2017	UEFA Champions League	
277	(Portugal) Cristiano Ronaldo (42)	3	Atlético Madrid	3–0	2 May 2017	UEFA Champions League	
278	(Portugal) Cristiano Ronaldo (43)	3	Real Sociedad	5–2	10 February 2018	La Liga	
279	(Portugal) Cristiano Ronaldo (44)	4	Girona	6–3	18 March 2018	La Liga	
280	(Wales) Gareth Bale (4)	3	Kashima Antlers	3–1~	19 December 2018	FIFA Club World Cup	
281	(France) Karim Benzema (5)	3	Athletic Bilbao	3–0	21 April 2019	La Liga	
282	(Brazil) Rodrygo	3	Galatasaray	3–0	6 November 2019	UEFA Champions League	
283	(France) Karim Benzema (6)	3	Celta Vigo	5–2	12 September 2021	La Liga	
284	(Spain) Marco Asensio	3	Mallorca	6–1	22 September 2021	La Liga	
285	(France) Karim Benzema (7)	3	Paris Saint-Germain	3–1	9 March 2022	UEFA Champions League	
286	(France) Karim Benzema (8)	3	Chelsea	3–1¤	6 April 2022	UEFA Champions League	
287	(Brazil) Vinícius Júnior	3	Levante	6–0	12 May 2022	La Liga	
288	(France) Karim Benzema (9)	3	Valladolid	6–0	2 April 2023	La Liga	
289	(France) Karim Benzema (10)	3	Barcelona	4–0¤	5 April 2023	Copa del Rey	
290	(France) Karim Benzema (11)	3	Almería	4–2	29 April 2023	La Liga	
291	(Brazil) Vinícius Júnior (2)	3	Barcelona	4–1~	14 January 2024	Supercopa de España	
292	(Brazil) Vinícius Júnior (3)	3	Borussia Dortmund	5–2	22 October 2024	UEFA Champions League	
293	(Brazil) Vinícius Júnior (4)	3	Osasuna	4–0	9 November 2024	La Liga	
294	(France) Kylian Mbappé	3	Valladolid	3–0¤	25 January 2025	La Liga	
295	(France) Kylian Mbappé (2)	3	Manchester City	3–1	19 February 2025	UEFA Champions League	
296	(France) Kylian Mbappé (3)	3	Barcelona	3–4¤	11 May 2025	La Liga	
297	(France) Kylian Mbappé (4)	3	Kairat	5–0¤	30 September 2025	UEFA Champions League	
298	(France) Kylian Mbappé (5)	4	Olympiacos	4–3¤	26 November 2025	UEFA Champions League	
299	(Spain) Gonzalo García	3	Real Betis	5–1	4 January 2026	La Liga	
300	(Uruguay) Federico Valverde	3	Manchester City	3–0	11 March 2026	UEFA Champions League	
301	(France) Kylian Mbappé (6)	3	Real Sociedad	4–1	26 August 2026	La Liga	

== Records and statistics ==
As of 26 August 2026

Bold indicates a player who is currently active in Real Madrid.

=== By player ===
#	Player	Hat-tricks
1	(Portugal) Cristiano Ronaldo	44
2	(Argentina) Alfredo Di Stéfano	28
3	(Hungary) Ferenc Puskás	23
4	(France) Karim Benzema	11
5	(Spain) Pahiño	10
6	(Spain) Manuel Alday	9
7	(Mexico) Hugo Sánchez	8
8	(Spain) Fernando Sañudo	7
8	(Spain) Santillana	7
8	(Spain) Raúl	7
11	(Spain) Pruden	6
11	(Spain) Sabino Barinaga	6
11	(Spain) Amancio	6
11	(France) **Kylian Mbappé**	6
15	(Spain) Pirri	5
15	(Argentina) Gonzalo Higuaín	5
17	(Spain) Gaspar Rubio	4
17	(Spain) Fernando Hierro	4
17	(Wales) Gareth Bale	4
17	(Brazil) **Vinícius Júnior**	4
21	(Spain) Santiago Bernabéu	3
21	(Spain) Juan Monjardín	3
21	(Spain) Uribe	3
21	(Spain) Jaime Lazcano	3
21	(Spain) Luis Regueiro	3
21	(Spain) Jesús Narro	3
21	(Spain) Pepillo	3
21	(Spain) Emilio Butragueño	3
21	(Argentina) Jorge Valdano	3
21	(Croatia) Davor Šuker	3
31	(Spain) Manuel Olivares	2
31	(Hungary) Vilmos Kelemen	2
31	(Spain) Marcial Arbiza	2
31	(Spain) Chus Alonso	2
31	(Spain) Ramón Marsal	2
31	(Argentina) Héctor Rial	2
31	(Spain) Paco Gento	2
31	(Spain) Ramón Grosso	2
31	(Spain) Juanito	2
31	(Spain) Míchel	2
31	(Chile) Iván Zamorano	2
31	(Brazil) Ronaldo	2
31	(Spain) Guti	2
31	(Netherlands) Ruud van Nistelrooy	2
45	39 players	1

=== By nationality ===
#	Nation	Players
1	Spain	56
2	Argentina	6
3	Brazil	3
3	France	3
5	Hungary	2
5	Netherlands	2
7	Chile	1
7	Croatia	1
7	Dominican Republic	1
7	Germany	1
7	Mexico	1
7	Portugal	1
7	Romania	1
7	Slovakia	1
7	Togo	1
7	Uruguay	1
7	Wales	1

=== Most hat-tricks by competition ===
Competition	Player	Hat-tricks
La Liga	(Portugal) Cristiano Ronaldo	34
European Cup / UEFA Champions League	(Portugal) Cristiano Ronaldo	7
Copa del Rey	(Hungary) Ferenc Puskás	6
Copa de la Liga	(Spain) Santillana	1
Supercopa de España	(Spain) Raúl	1
Supercopa de España	(Brazil) **Vinícius Júnior**	1
Latin Cup	(Spain) Paco Gento	1
European Cup Winners' Cup	(Spain) Juan Planelles	1
UEFA Cup	(Spain) Emilio Butragueño	1
UEFA Cup	(Spain) Fernando Hierro	1
FIFA Club World Cup	(Portugal) Cristiano Ronaldo	1
FIFA Club World Cup	(Wales) Gareth Bale	1

== See also ==
- List of Real Madrid CF records and statistics
- List of La Liga hat-tricks
