= Joaquín Navarro =

Joaquín Navarro may refer to:

- Joaquín Navarro (footballer) (1921-2002), Spanish football defender
- Joaquín Navarro-Valls (1936-2017), Director of the Holy See (Vatican) Press Office
- Ximo Navarro (footballer, born 1988), Spanish football right midfielder
- Ximo Navarro (footballer, born 1990), Spanish football rightback
