= Julio César Britos =

Uruguayan footballer (1926–1998)

Personal information
- Full name: Julio César Britos Vázquez
- Date of birth: 18 May 1926
- Place of birth: Uruguay
- Date of death: 27 March 1998 (aged 71)
- Position: Forward

Senior career*
Years	Team	Apps	(Gls)
1947–1953	Peñarol		
1953–1955	Real Madrid	3	(2)
1955-1957	Nacional		

International career
1947–1952	Uruguay	11	(6)
Medal record
Representing Uruguay
FIFA World Cup
Winner	1950 Brazil
- * Club domestic league appearances and goals

Julio César Britos Vázquez (18 May 1926 – 27 March 1998), known as the "poroto", was a Uruguayan footballer, who played for CA Peñarol and Real Madrid.

Britos was born in Montevideo. He was part of the Uruguay national football team that won the 1950 FIFA World Cup, but did not play in any matches in the tournament. In total he earned 11 caps and scored 6 goals for Uruguay.

== Career statistics ==
=== International ===
Appearances and goals by national team and year
National team	Year	Apps	Goals
Uruguay	1947	6	3
Uruguay	1948	2	1
Uruguay	1949	0	0
Uruguay	1950	2	1
Uruguay	1951	0	0
Uruguay	1952	1	1
Total		11	6

== Honours ==
Peñarol

- Primera División (AUF): 1949, 1951, 1953

Real Madrid

- La Liga: 1953–54

Uruguay

- FIFA World Cup: 1950
