= Macala (footballer) =

Spanish footballer (1921–1994)

- Macala in 1947

Personal information
- Full name: Cándido Luis Agustín Gardoy Martín
- Date of birth: 21 January 1921
- Place of birth: Barcelona, Spain
- Date of death: 13 March 1992 (aged 71)
- Height: 1.70 m (5 ft 7 in)
- Position: Forward

Senior career*
Years	Team	Apps	(Gls)
1938–1940	Athletic Bilbao	9	(1)
1940–1943	Espanyol	51	(14)
1943–1944	Zaragoza	19	(4)
1944–1947	Hércules	69	(23)
1947–1951	Real Madrid	57	(10)
1951–1953	Racing Santander	35	(6)
1953–1954	Gimnástica	3	(1)

International career
1950	Spain	0	(0)
- * Club domestic league appearances and goals

Cándido Luis Agustín Gardoy Martín (21 January 1921 – 13 March 1992), known as Macala, was a Spanish footballer who played as a forward.

He amassed Segunda División totals of 66 games and 21 goals over the course of six seasons, with Zaragoza, Hércules and Gimnástica. In La Liga he appeared for Athletic Bilbao, Hércules, Real Madrid, and Racing Santander, adding 177 matches and 38 goals in a 15-year professional career.

== Early life ==
Macala was born in Barcelona. His father, Luis Gardoy (1891–1939), known as Macala, was a renowned pelotari born in Guernica. Luis spent several years in Latin America, playing the sport in various countries such as Cuba, the United States, Mexico, and Peru before eventually settling in Barcelona. During this time, he played a pelota match alongside Ricardo Zamora, the famous Spanish international goalkeeper. In 1917, he married a Catalan woman, and from this marriage, Cándido Gardoy was born in 1921, inheriting his father’s nickname. In 1923, at just two years old, he moved with his family to Guernica.

== Career ==
Macala joined Athletic Bilbao in late 1938, competing in various matches of the Biscay Regional Championship, alongside several young players such as Piru Gaínza and Jose María Echevarría. With elite competition suspended due to the Spanish Civil War, Macala was part of a squad composed of inexperienced players. In th 1939–40 season he made his La Liga debut on 3 December 1939, in a 1–3 lose against Athletic Aviación, as a full member of the first team, helping rebuild the Bilbao side after the war. In his debut season, he made nine appearances in La Liga and eight in the Regional Championship.

In 1940, he joined Espanyol, where he played for three seasons, earning more regular playing time. He later played the 1943–44 season in Segunda División with Real Zaragoza. In 1944–45, he signed for Hércules, achieving promotion to La Liga in 1945. He remained with the Alicante-based club for two more seasons, one in the top division and one in the second tier.

In 1947–48, coming from Hércules in Segunda División, he signed for Real Madrid, which spent four seasons with the Merengues, narrowly avoiding relegation in his first year. He was part of the team that won the 1947 Copa Eva Duarte against Valencia, which was played in 1948, his first and only major title as a professional footballer. Macala was also known as the first player in Real Madrid's history to wear the number 7 jersey, doing so in the Madrid derby in November 1947.

In 1951, he joined Racing Santander, where he played for two seasons before retiring in Segunda División, concluding his career with Gimnástica de Torrelavega in the 1953–54 season.

He was called up once to the Spain national team, though he never made his debut. Years later, a player from Hércules, Rafael Pastor García, was nicknamed Makalita or Macalita due to his resemblance to Macala.

== Career statistics ==
=== Club ===
Appearances and goals by club, season and competition
Club	Season	League			Cup		Other		Total	
Club	Season	Division	Apps	Goals	Apps	Goals	Apps	Goals	Apps	Goals
Athletic Bilbao	1938–39	La Liga	—		2	1	—		2	1
Athletic Bilbao	1939–40	La Liga	9	1	0	0	—		9	1
Athletic Bilbao	Total		9	1	2	1	—		11	2
Espanyol	1940–41	La Liga	8	0	5	1	—		13	1
Espanyol	1941–42	La Liga	21	9	6	2	—		27	11
Espanyol	1942–43	La Liga	22	5	3	0	1 (Note: Appearances in La Liga play-offs)	0	26	5
Espanyol	Total		51	14	14	3	1	0	66	17
Zaragoza	1943–44	Segunda División	19	4	2	0	—		21	4
Hércules	1944–45	Segunda División	18	4	0	0	—		18	4
Hércules	1945–46	La Liga	25	7	2	0	—		27	7
Hércules	1946–47	Segunda División	26	12	2	1	—		28	13
Hércules	Total		69	23	4	1	—		73	24
Real Madrid	1947–48	La Liga	11	0	3	1	1 (Note: Appearances in Copa Eva Duarte)	1	15	2
Real Madrid	1948–49	La Liga	23	3	3	1	—		26	4
Real Madrid	1949–50	La Liga	10	2	5	5	—		15	7
Real Madrid	1950–51	La Liga	13	5	1	0	—		14	5
Real Madrid	Total		57	10	12	7	1	1	70	18
Racing Santander	1951–52	La Liga	26	5	0	0	5	1	31	6
Racing Santander	1952–53	La Liga	9	1	2	0	—		11	1
Racing Santander	Total		35	6	2	0	5	1	42	7
Gimnástica	1953–54	Segunda División	3	1	0	0	—		3	1
Career total			243	59	36	12	7	2	286	73

== Honours ==
Real Madrid

- Copa Eva Duarte: 1947
