= Manuel Pazos =

Spanish footballer (1930–2019)

Personal information
- Full name: Manuel Pazos González
- Date of birth: 17 March 1930
- Place of birth: Cambados, Spain
- Date of death: 24 May 2019 (aged 89)
- Place of death: Elche, Spain
- Height: 1.83 m (6 ft 0 in)
- Position: Goalkeeper

Senior career*
Years	Team	Apps	(Gls)
1951–1953	Celta Vigo	26	(0)
1953–1954	Real Madrid	17	(0)
1954–1955	Hércules	25	(0)
1955–1962	Atlético Madrid	146	(0)
1962–1969	Elche	168	(0)
Total		382	(0)
- * Club domestic league appearances and goals

Manuel Pazos González (17 March 1930 – 24 May 2019) was a Spanish professional footballer who played a goalkeeper.

== Career ==
Born in Cambados, Pazos played for Celta Vigo, Real Madrid, Hércules, Atlético Madrid and Elche.

He died on 24 May 2019, aged 89.
