= Juan Alonso (footballer, born 1927) =

Spanish footballer (1927–1994)

Personal information
- Full name: Juan Adelarpe Alonso
- Date of birth: 13 December 1927
- Place of birth: Hondarribia, Spain
- Date of death: 8 September 1994 (aged 66)
- Place of death: Hondarribia, Spain
- Height: 1.78 m (5 ft 10 in)
- Position: Goalkeeper

Youth career
- Keriztetxiki

Senior career*
Years	Team	Apps	(Gls)
1946–1947	Logroñés		
1947–1949	Racing Ferrol		
1949–1960	Real Madrid	225	(0)
1960–1963	Plus Ultra		

International career
1955–1956	Spain B	3	(0)
1958–1959	Spain	2	(0)
- * Club domestic league appearances and goals

Juan Adelarpe Alonso (13 December 1927 – 8 September 1994), sometimes called Juanito Alonso, was a Spanish footballer who played as a goalkeeper for Real Madrid and was part of their European Cup victories in 1956, 1957 and 1958. He earned two caps for the Spain national team. Alonso won the Ricardo Zamora Trophy during the 1954–55 season. At the end of his career he played a few matches for Real Madrid's second team, which then played under the name AD Plus Ultra in the second division.

== Honours ==
Real Madrid

- Spanish League: 1953–54, 1954–55, 1956–57, 1957–58
- European Cup: 1955–56, 1956–57, 1957–58, 1958–59, 1959–60

Individual

- Zamora Trophy: 1954–55
