= Jesús Narro =

Spanish footballer (1922–1987)

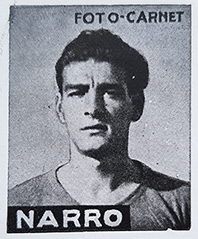

Personal information
- Full name: Jesús Narro Sancho
- Date of birth: 4 January 1922
- Place of birth: Tolosa, Guipúzcoa, Spain
- Date of death: 1 July 1987 (aged 65)
- Height: 1.75 m (5 ft 9 in)
- Position: Midfielder

Senior career*
Years	Team	Apps	(Gls)
1943–1948	Real Murcia	90	(16)
1948–1952	Real Madrid	66	(13)
1952–1953	Sporting de Gijón	12	(1)
1953–1954	Real Madrid	7	(3)
1954	Real Murcia	14	(6)
Total		189	(31)
- * Club domestic league appearances and goals

Jesús Narro Sancho (4 January 1922 – 1 July 1987) was a Spanish footballer. As a left midfielder, he was part of Real Murcia for three seasons scoring 21 goals, Sporting de Gijón for part of a season as a loan, scoring one goal and at his peak he was part of the Real Madrid for six seasons scoring 13 goals and being part of the team that won the league title in his final season in La Liga with the team "merengue" along with the great Alfredo Di Stéfano.

== Early life ==
Narro was born in Tolosa, Gipuzkoa, Spain, on 4 January 1922.

== Outstanding performances ==
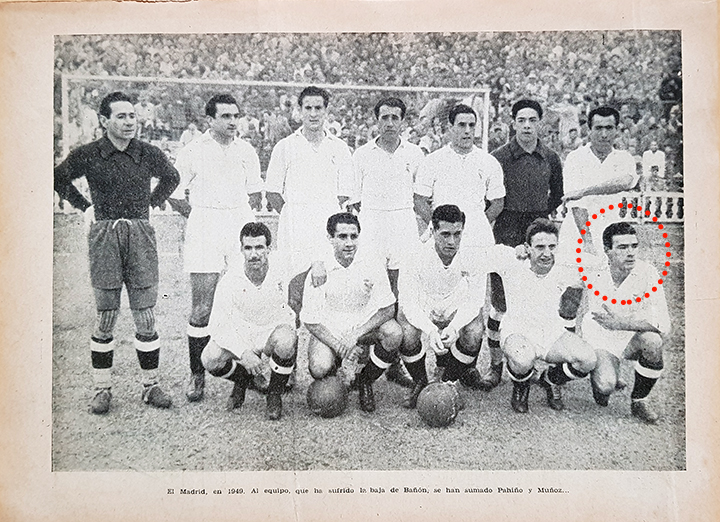
Real Madrid Official Team Photo 1949 (Jesus Narro Sancho in Red)

His most outstanding performance was on 14 January 1951 by being on the initial line-up and performing a hat-trick (min. '8 '17 and '29) in the Spanish derby against FC Barcelona. Real Madrid won the game by a score of 4–1 and was cheered by 75.145 spectators who attended the game at Chamartin Stadium, currently known as Santiago Bernabeu Stadium. Don Jesus scored another hat-trick on 15 October 1950 against Club Deportivo Alcoyano and a poker-of-goals (4) on 8 October 1950 against the now extinct UE Lleida in Catalonia.

== Retirement ==
With a total of 13.452 minutes in La Liga of Spain, starting in 150 games, 23 games in Copa del Rey Don Jesus Narro Sancho retired from professional soccer at age 31.

== Professional goals ==
#	Date	Venue	Team Played	Opponent	Score Time	Result	Competition
1	15 October 1944	Murcia	Real Murcia	Sevilla FC	'7	3-1	La Liga
2	15 October 1944	Murcia	Real Murcia	Sevilla FC	'17	3-1	La Liga
3	17 March 1946	Murcia	Real Murcia	Sevilla FC	'3	1–1	La Liga
4	24 March 1946	Gijón	Real Murcia	Sporting de Gijón	'52	2–0	La Liga
5	31 March 1946	Murcia	Real Murcia	RCD Espanyol	'11	2-2	La Liga
6	20 April 1947	Murcia	Real Murcia	Levante UD	'25	1–3	Copa del Rey
7	1 October 1947	Murcia	Real Murcia	Barakaldo CF	'38	4–1	La Liga
8	4 January 1948	Murcia	Real Murcia	Levante UD	'50	3-0	La Liga
9	18 January 1948	Murcia	Real Murcia	RCD Córdoba	'61	2–0	La Liga
10	11 April 1948	Granada	Real Murcia	Granada CF	'46	3-4	La Liga
11	1 October 1947	Murcia	Real Murcia	Levante UD	'59	3–0	Copa del Rey
12	4 January 1948	Murcia	Real Murcia	Valencia CF Mestalla	'38	5-0	Copa del Rey
13	4 January 1948	Murcia	Real Murcia	Valencia CF Mestalla	'62	5-0	Copa del Rey
14	18 January 1948	Murcia	Real Murcia	Real Oviedo	'19	2–0	Copa del Rey
15	11 April 1948	Oviedo	Real Murcia	Real Oviedo	'54	2-2	Copa del Rey
16	11 April 1948	Murcia	Real Murcia	RCD Espanyol	'61	2-2	Copa del Rey
17	12 February 1950	Madrid	Real Madrid C.F.	Atlético de Madrid	'30	1-5	La Liga
18	8 October 1950	Lleida	Real Madrid C.F.	UE Lleida	'26	6-1	La Liga
19	8 October 1950	Lleida	Real Madrid C.F.	UE Lleida	'38	6-1	La Liga
20	8 October 1950	Lleida	Real Madrid C.F.	UE Lleida	'49	6-1	La Liga
21	8 October 1950	Lleida	Real Madrid C.F.	UE Lleida	'72	6-1	La Liga
22	15 October 1950	Madrid	Real Madrid C.F.	CD Alcoyano	'41	7-0	La Liga
23	15 October 1950	Madrid	Real Madrid C.F.	CD Alcoyano	'72	7-0	La Liga
24	15 October 1950	Madrid	Real Madrid C.F.	CD Alcoyano	'89	7-0	La Liga
25	29 October 1950	Madrid	Real Madrid C.F.	Sevilla FC	'51	3-3	La Liga
26	14 January 1950	Madrid	Real Madrid C.F.	FC Barcelona	'8	4-1	La Liga
27	14 January 1950	Madrid	Real Madrid C.F.	FC Barcelona	'17	4-1	La Liga
28	14 January 1950	Madrid	Real Madrid C.F.	FC Barcelona	'29	4-1	La Liga
29	25 November 1951	Madrid	Real Madrid C.F.	Deportivo de La Coruña	'31	3-2	La Liga
30	8 February 1953	Gijón	Sporting de Gijón	Deportivo de La Coruña	'70	1-1	La Liga
31	14 February 1954	Murcia	Real Murcia	CD Alcoyano	'44	4-0	Segunda División
32	21 February 1954	Murcia	Real Murcia	Real Balompédica Linense	'25	3-1	Segunda División
33	28 March 1954	Murcia	Real Murcia	UD Melilla	'80	4-2	Segunda División
34	4 April 1954	Murcia	Real Murcia	Unión Deportiva España	'20	2-1	Segunda División
35	25 April 1954	Murcia	Real Murcia	Hércules CF	'55	2-3	Segunda División
36	6 June 1954	Murcia	Real Murcia	San Fernando CD	'45	3-2	Segunda División
