= Joaquín Navarro (footballer) =

Spanish footballer

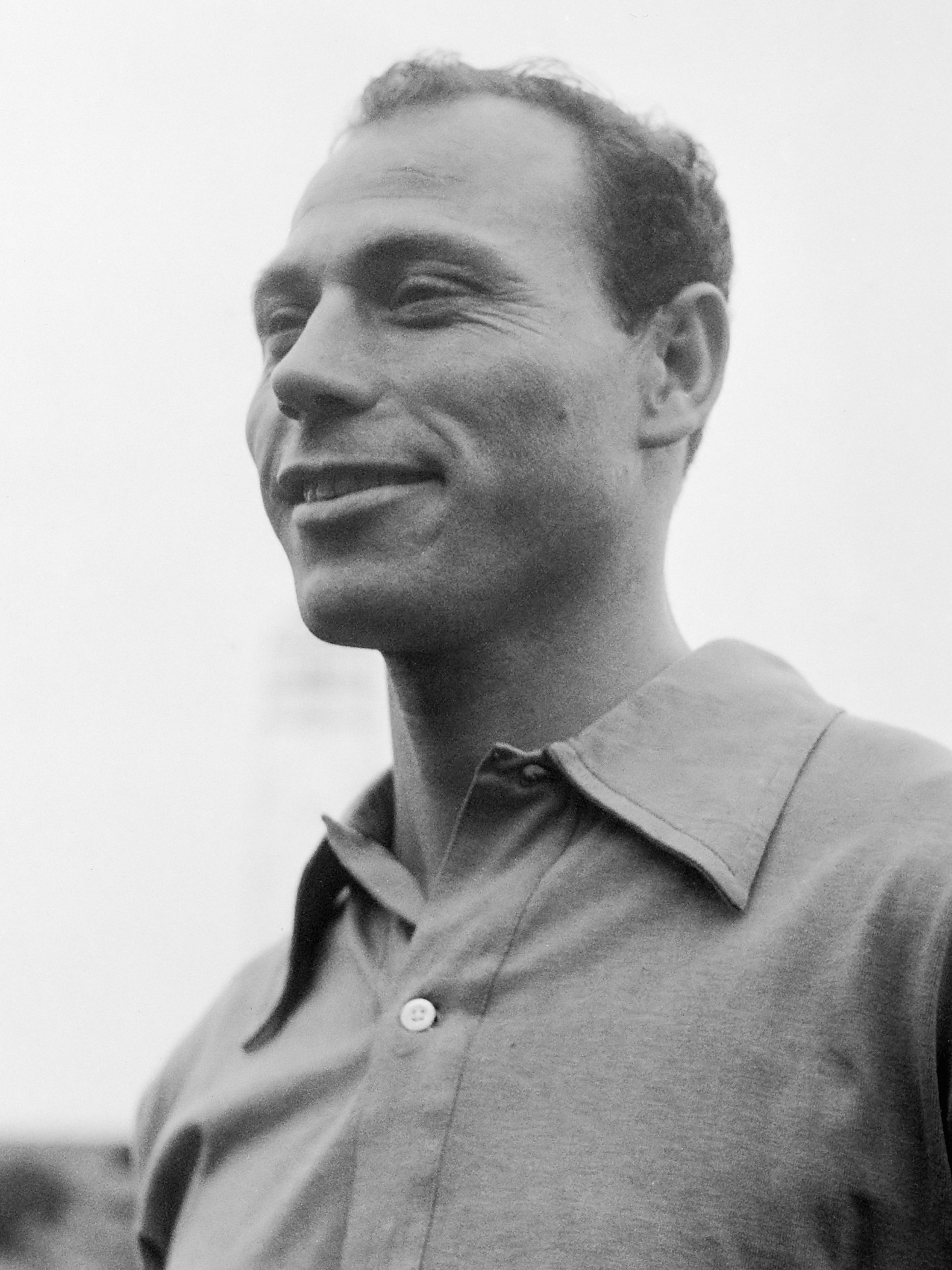
- Navarro in 1953

Personal information
- Full name: Joaquín Navarro Perona
- Date of birth: 2 August 1921
- Place of birth: Gavà, Spain
- Date of death: 5 November 2002 (aged 81)
- Place of death: Barbastro, Spain
- Height: 1.65 m (5 ft 5 in)
- Position: Defender

Youth career
- CF Gavà

Senior career*
Years	Team	Apps	(Gls)
1939–1941	CF Gavà		
1941–1942	FC Barcelona		
1942–1949	CE Sabadell FC		
1949–1957	Real Madrid		

International career
1947	Catalonia	1	(0)
1952–1953	Spain	5	(0)
- * Club domestic league appearances and goals

Joaquín Navarro Perona (2 August 1921 – 5 November 2002) was a Spanish professional footballer who played as a defender.

== Club career ==
Born in Gavà, Barcelona, Catalonia, Navarro moved to local and La Liga giants FC Barcelona in 1941, from hometown club CF Gavà. In his only season at the Camp Nou he won the Copa del Generalísimo, but appeared sparingly in the league albeit scoring three goals.

Subsequently, Navarro joined neighbouring CE Sabadell FC in Segunda División, promoting in his first year. In the following six seasons he suffered two top flight relegations with the club, and netted a career-best five goals in 21 games in the 1947–48 campaign as the Arlequinats finished in 12th position, narrowly avoiding another drop.

In the summer of 1949, Navarro signed for Real Madrid, playing 21 matches (one goal) in his first season. During his eight-year spell with the Merengues he took part in 272 official games and won five major titles, including three leagues and the 1955–56 edition of the European Cup, contributing with three appearances in the latter competition.

Navarro retired in 1957 at the age of 36, playing 288 top level matches over 14 seasons. He died on 6 November 2002 in Barbastro, Aragon, aged 81.

== International career ==
Navarro played five times for Spain, during slightly less than one year. He made his debut on 7 December 1952 in a 0–1 friendly loss to Argentina, in Madrid.

Additionally, Navarro was the first Spanish player to be selected to a World XI FIFA team, appearing in a 4–4 draw against England at Wembley on 21 October 1953 and being subsequently nicknamed El Fifo.

== Personal life ==
Navarro's younger brother, Alfonso (born 8 April 1929), was also a footballer. A forward, he too played for Barcelona (1946–50, 1954–56) and Real Madrid (1950–51), also representing Real Valladolid, CA Osasuna and CD Condal in an 11-year professional career.

Navarro II died 10 August 1969 at age 40 after a long illness.

== Honours ==
Barcelona

- Copa del Generalísimo: 1942

Sabadell

- Segunda División: 1945–46

Real Madrid

- La Liga: 1953–54, 1954–55, 1956–57
- European Cup: 1955–56
- Latin Cup: 1955
