= List of El Clásico matches =

This is a list of all matches contested between the Spanish football clubs Barcelona and Real Madrid, a fixture known as El Clásico.

The club name in bold indicates a win for that team. The goals column lists the scorer and the time the goal was scored.

== Competitive matches ==
=== Primera División matches ===
Barcelona and Real Madrid have faced each other in every La Liga season since its inception in 1929, as inaugural members and two of the only three teams (the other being Athletic Bilbao) to have never been relegated from the Primera División.

No.	Date	Matchweek	Home team	Away team	Score	Goals (home)	Goals (away)
1	17 February 1929	2	Barcelona	**Real Madrid**	1–2	Parera (70)	Morera (10, 55)
2	9 May 1929	11	Real Madrid	**Barcelona**	0–1		Sastre (83)
3	26 January 1930	9	Barcelona	**Real Madrid**	1–4	Bestit (63)	Rubio (10, 37), F. López (17), Lazcano (71)
4	30 March 1930	18	**Real Madrid**	Barcelona	5–1	Rubio (5, 23), Lazcano (42, 68, 72)	Goiburu (84)
5	1 February 1931	9	Real Madrid	Barcelona	0–0		
6	5 April 1931	18	**Barcelona**	Real Madrid	3–1	Ramón (10, 38, 80)	Eugenio (39)
7	31 January 1932	9	**Real Madrid**	Barcelona	2–0	Olivares (26, 40)	
8	3 April 1932	18	Barcelona	Real Madrid	2–2	Samitier (20), Arocha (87 p.)	Lazcano (43), Regueiro (70)
9	1 January 1933	6	Barcelona	Real Madrid	1–1	Arocha (68)	Regueiro (78 p.)
10	5 March 1933	15	**Real Madrid**	Barcelona	2–1	Samitier (35, 68)	Goiburu (89)
11	26 November 1933	4	Barcelona	**Real Madrid**	1–2	Morera (46)	Olivares (9), Regueiro (26)
12	28 January 1934	13	**Real Madrid**	Barcelona	4–0	Valle (7), Samitier (20), Regueiro (30), Eugenio (50)	
13	3 February 1935	10	**Real Madrid**	Barcelona	8–2	Lazcano (15, 42, 73), Sañudo (21, 35, 47, 81), Regueiro (29)	Escolà (17), Guzmán (68)
14	21 April 1935	21	**Barcelona**	Real Madrid	5–0	Ventolrà (43, 62, 68, 82), Escolà (48)	
15	22 December 1935	7	Barcelona	**Real Madrid**	0–3		Regueiro (21), Diz (40), Lecue (47)
16	22 March 1936	18	**Real Madrid**	Barcelona	3–0	Lecue (10, 47), Emilin (43)	
17	28 January 1940	9	**Real Madrid**	Barcelona	2–1	Alonso (1), Lecue (75)	Pascual (3)
18	14 April 1940	20	Barcelona	Real Madrid	0–0		
19	1 December 1940	10	**Barcelona**	Real Madrid	3–0	Sospedra (49, 69), Valle Mas (53)	
20	23 February 1941	21	Real Madrid	**Barcelona**	1–2	Barinaga (49)	Bravo (60), Martín (63)
21	19 October 1941	4	**Real Madrid**	Barcelona	4–3	Arbiza (17, 70), Benito (35 o.g.), Belmar (55)	Calvet (25), Raich (60 p.), Gracia (87)
22	25 January 1942	17	Barcelona	**Real Madrid**	0–2		Alday (63, 78)
23	27 September 1942	1	**Real Madrid**	Barcelona	3–0	Arbiza (7, 89), Alsúa (52)	
24	10 January 1943	14	Barcelona	Real Madrid	5–5	Martín (25, 40), Escolà (31), Valle Mas (32, 62)	Alonso (10), Alday (27, 51), Botella (74), Mardones II (87)
25	2 January 1944	13	Real Madrid	**Barcelona**	0–1		Valle Mas (50)
26	9 April 1944	26	Barcelona	**Real Madrid**	1–2	Escolà (13)	Alsúa (62), Rosalén (71 o.g.)
27	12 November 1944	8	**Real Madrid**	Barcelona	1–0	Moleiro (21)	
28	25 March 1945	21	**Barcelona**	Real Madrid	5–0	César (41, 46), Bravo (52), Escolà (77), Gonzalvo III (86)	
29	25 November 1945	9	**Real Madrid**	Barcelona	3–2	Barinaga (23), Pruden (63), Belmar (67)	Martín (51), Gonzalvo III (85)
30	3 March 1946	22	**Barcelona**	Real Madrid	1–0	César (17)	
31	1 December 1946	11	**Real Madrid**	Barcelona	2–1	Corona (4 p.), Molowny (79)	Seguer (23)
32	30 March 1947	24	**Barcelona**	Real Madrid	3–2	Bravo (18), Navarro (39, 49)	Arsuaga (48, 60)
33	12 October 1947	4	Real Madrid	Barcelona	1–1	Barinaga (65)	Clemente (31 o.g.)
34	25 January 1948	17	**Barcelona**	Real Madrid	4–2	Seguer (2), Basora (28, 58), César (43)	Gallardo (68), Rafa Yunta (76)
35	19 September 1948	2	Real Madrid	**Barcelona**	1–2	Barinaga (60)	Florencio (41), Basora (48)
36	9 January 1949	15	**Barcelona**	Real Madrid	3–1	César (28, 61), Basora (56)	Pahiño (9)
37	18 September 1949	3	**Real Madrid**	Barcelona	6–1	Pahiño (2, 40, 68), Cabrera (4), Macala (62, 69)	Gonzalvo II (85)
38	15 January 1950	16	Barcelona	**Real Madrid**	2–3	Basora (41), César (53)	Pahiño (58), Rafael Verdú (66), Cabrera (73)
39	24 September 1950	3	**Barcelona**	Real Madrid	7–2	Nicolau (9, 56), César (14), Aurelio (39, 88), Gonzalvo III (62), Basora (82)	Molowny (15), García González (66)
40	14 January 1951	18	**Real Madrid**	Barcelona	4–1	Narro (8, 17, 29), Pahiño (13)	Canal (31)
41	11 November 1951	10	**Real Madrid**	Barcelona	5–1	Molowny (3), Cabrera (32), Pahiño (35, 87), Olsen (57)	Basora (44)
42	2 March 1952	25	**Barcelona**	Real Madrid	4–2	Vila Soler (13), César (36, 56, 74)	Olsen (33), Arsuaga (39)
43	23 November 1952	11	**Real Madrid**	Barcelona	2–1	Arsuaga (76, 80)	Manchón (67)
44	5 April 1953	26	**Barcelona**	Real Madrid	1–0	Moreno (15)	
45	25 October 1953	7	**Real Madrid**	Barcelona	5–0	Di Stéfano (10, 85), Olsen (34, 35), Molowny (39)	
46	21 February 1954	22	**Barcelona**	Real Madrid	5–1	Tejada (14, 86), César (50), Moreno (74), Manchón (89)	Di Stéfano (6)
47	21 November 1954	11	**Real Madrid**	Barcelona	3–0	Di Stéfano (44 p.), Héctor Rial (66), Joseito (67)	
48	6 March 1955	26	Barcelona	Real Madrid	2–2	Basora (31), Dagoberto Moll (70)	Gento (19, 64)
49	13 November 1955	10	**Real Madrid**	Barcelona	2–1	Héctor Rial (35), Marquitos (89)	Areta (77)
50	18 March 1956	25	**Barcelona**	Real Madrid	2–0	Villaverde (18, 29)	
51	11 November 1956	10	**Barcelona**	Real Madrid	1–0	Luis Suárez (46)	
52	3 March 1957	25	**Real Madrid**	Barcelona	1–0	Joseito (21)	
53	13 October 1957	5	**Real Madrid**	Barcelona	3–0	Kopa (10), Héctor Rial (43), Di Stéfano (73)	
54	2 February 1958	20	Barcelona	**Real Madrid**	0–2		Marsal (34), Héctor Rial (37)
55	26 October 1958	7	**Barcelona**	Real Madrid	4–0	Evaristo (22, 68, 70), Tejada (84)	
56	15 February 1959	22	**Real Madrid**	Barcelona	1–0	Herrera (79)	
57	29 November 1959	11	**Real Madrid**	Barcelona	2–0	Mateos (5), Di Stéfano (82)	
58	20 March 1960	26	**Barcelona**	Real Madrid	3–1	Kocsis (50), Martínez (60), Villaverde (62)	Di Stéfano (58)
59	4 December 1960	12	Barcelona	**Real Madrid**	3–5	Martínez (28), Villaverde (34), Kubala (89)	Di Stéfano (3, 81), del Sol (15), Gento (43, 79)
60	26 March 1961	27	**Real Madrid**	Barcelona	3–2	del Sol (55), Di Stéfano (60), Puskás (78)	Luis Suárez (80), Kubala (89)
61	30 September 1961	5	**Real Madrid**	Barcelona	2–0	Puskás (14), del Sol (72)	
62	21 January 1962	20	**Barcelona**	Real Madrid	3–1	Evaristo (4, 83), Kocsis (40)	Félix Ruiz (86)
63	30 September 1962	3	**Real Madrid**	Barcelona	2–0	Di Stéfano (20, 70)	
64	27 January 1963	18	Barcelona	**Real Madrid**	1–5	Ré (34)	Puskás (24 p., 35, 71), Di Stéfano (47), Gento (67)
65	15 December 1963	12	**Real Madrid**	Barcelona	4–0	Puskás (37, 68, 84 p.), Di Stéfano (77)	
66	30 March 1964	27	Barcelona	**Real Madrid**	1–2	Zaldúa (27)	Gento (18), Puskás (43)
67	8 November 1964	9	**Real Madrid**	Barcelona	4–1	Amancio (16, 31, 74), Serena (76)	Ré (68)
68	28 February 1965	24	Barcelona	**Real Madrid**	1–2	Ré (40)	Pirri (63), Serena (70)
69	19 December 1965	14	Real Madrid	**Barcelona**	1–3	Félix Ruiz (20)	Fusté (7, 8), Zaldúa (34)
70	27 March 1966	29	**Barcelona**	Real Madrid	2–1	Rifé (59), Zaballa (63)	Gento (39)
71	20 November 1966	10	**Real Madrid**	Barcelona	1–0	Veloso (89)	
72	19 March 1967	25	**Barcelona**	Real Madrid	2–1	Fusté (7, 89)	Amancio (42)
73	10 December 1967	12	Real Madrid	Barcelona	1–1	Gento (65 p.)	Zaldúa (78)
74	9 April 1968	27	Barcelona	Real Madrid	1–1	Zaldúa (12)	Pirri (43)
75	16 November 1968	9	**Real Madrid**	Barcelona	2–1	Pirri (32), José Luis (75)	Zaldúa (19)
76	9 March 1969	24	Barcelona	Real Madrid	1–1	Zaldúa (26)	Gento (87 p.)
77	14 September 1969	1	Real Madrid	Barcelona	3–3	Fleitas (18, 38), Gento (63)	Bustillo (3, 5), Rexach (71)
78	28 December 1969	16	**Barcelona**	Real Madrid	1–0	Gallego (29)	
79	25 October 1970	7	Real Madrid	**Barcelona**	0–1		Zabalza (28)
80	14 February 1971	22	Barcelona	**Real Madrid**	0–1		Grande (67)
81	27 November 1971	11	Real Madrid	Barcelona	1–1	Grosso (6)	Asensi (68)
82	3 April 1972	28	**Barcelona**	Real Madrid	1–0	Asensi (11)	
83	1 October 1972	5	**Barcelona**	Real Madrid	1–0	Barrios (52)	
84	24 February 1973	22	Real Madrid	Barcelona	0–0		
85	7 October 1973	6	Barcelona	Real Madrid	0–0		
86	16 February 1974	22	Real Madrid	**Barcelona**	0–5		Asensi (30, 54), Cruyff (39), Juan Carlos (65), Sotil (69)
87	4 January 1975	15	**Real Madrid**	Barcelona	1–0	Martínez (43)	
88	11 May 1975	32	Barcelona	Real Madrid	0–0		
89	27 December 1975	15	**Barcelona**	Real Madrid	2–1	Neeskens (3), Rexach (89)	Pirri (64)
90	30 April 1976	32	Real Madrid	**Barcelona**	0–2		Rexach (15), Heredia (64)
91	19 September 1976	3	**Barcelona**	Real Madrid	3–1	Marcial (29), Cruyff (53), Heredia (86)	Pirri (52)
92	30 January 1977	20	Real Madrid	Barcelona	1–1	Pirri (2 p.)	Cruyff (16)
93	4 December 1977	12	Barcelona	**Real Madrid**	2–3	Rexach (30, 67 p.)	Jensen (23), Santillana (35), Stielike (54)
94	5 April 1978	29	**Real Madrid**	Barcelona	4–0	Jensen (6, 10), Juanito (69), Santillana (80)	
95	23 September 1978	4	**Real Madrid**	Barcelona	3–1	Santillana (29, 46), Jensen (32)	Neeskens (15)
96	17 February 1979	21	**Barcelona**	Real Madrid	2–0	Krankl (52), Asensi (61)	
97	23 September 1979	3	**Real Madrid**	Barcelona	3–2	Santillana (6), Juanito (8), Cunningham (32)	Landáburu (23), Krankl (36)
98	10 February 1980	20	Barcelona	**Real Madrid**	0–2		García Hernández (61), Santillana (63)
99	30 November 1980	13	**Barcelona**	Real Madrid	2–1	Schuster (15), Quini (64)	Juanito (22)
100	29 March 1981	30	**Real Madrid**	Barcelona	3–0	Juanito (53 p.), Santillana (71), Stielike (76)	
101	20 December 1981	16	**Barcelona**	Real Madrid	3–1	Alexanko (7), Quini (53, 60 p.)	Juanito (49)
102	18 April 1982	33	**Real Madrid**	Barcelona	3–1	Rafael Cortés (6), Stielike (45 p.), Isidro (82)	Quini (42)
103	27 November 1982	13	Real Madrid	**Barcelona**	0–2		Esteban Vigo (14), Quini (86)
104	26 March 1983	30	**Barcelona**	Real Madrid	2–1	Maradona (45), Perico Alonso (77)	Juanito (20)
105	22 October 1983	8	Barcelona	**Real Madrid**	1–2	Quini (17 p.)	Juanito (12 p.), Santillana (20)
106	25 February 1984	25	**Real Madrid**	Barcelona	2–1	Juanito (16), Santillana (80)	Maradona (56)
107	2 September 1984	1	Real Madrid	**Barcelona**	0–3		Ángel (46 o.g.), Archibald (86), Calderé (89)
108	30 December 1984	18	**Barcelona**	Real Madrid	3–2	Gerardo (25), Migueli (53), Esteban Vigo (79)	Sanchís (30), Butragueño (89)
109	9 November 1985	11	**Barcelona**	Real Madrid	2–0	Marcos (2), Calderé (72)	
110	8 March 1986	28	**Real Madrid**	Barcelona	3–1	Maceda (64), Valdano (67), Butragueño (83)	Amarilla (51)
111	8 October 1986	8	Real Madrid	Barcelona	1–1	H. Sánchez (27 p.)	Pedraza (6)
112	31 January 1987	25	**Barcelona**	Real Madrid	3–2	Lineker (2, 5, 47)	Valdano (61), H. Sánchez (80 p.)
113	12 April 1987	35	Real Madrid	Barcelona	0–0		
114	23 May 1987	40	**Barcelona**	Real Madrid	2–1	Lineker (39), Roberto (60 p.)	H. Sánchez (53)
115	2 January 1988	16	**Real Madrid**	Barcelona	2–1	H. Sánchez (22 p., 41)	Schuster (30 p.)
116	30 April 1988	35	**Barcelona**	Real Madrid	2–0	Carrasco (1), Lineker (70)	
117	22 October 1988	8	**Real Madrid**	Barcelona	3–2	H. Sánchez (57), Aldana (59), Gordillo (81)	Bakero (21), Carrasco (70)
118	1 April 1989	27	Barcelona	Real Madrid	0–0		
119	7 October 1989	6	**Barcelona**	Real Madrid	3–1	Salinas (10), Koeman (74 p., 89 p.)	H. Sánchez (5 p.)
120	15 February 1990	25	**Real Madrid**	Barcelona	3–2	Míchel (24), Butragueño (45), Hugo Sánchez (46 p.)	Salinas (54, 57)
121	19 January 1991	19	**Barcelona**	Real Madrid	2–1	Laudrup (18), Spasić (62 o.g.)	Butragueño (28)
122	8 June 1991	38	**Real Madrid**	Barcelona	1–0	Aldana (47)	
123	19 October 1991	6	Real Madrid	Barcelona	1–1	Prosinečki (19)	Koeman (58 p.)
124	7 March 1992	25	Barcelona	Real Madrid	1–1	Koeman (36)	Hierro (66)
125	5 September 1992	1	**Barcelona**	Real Madrid	2–1	Bakero (4), Stoichkov (87)	Míchel (71 p.)
126	29 January 1993	20	**Real Madrid**	Barcelona	2–1	Zamorano (9), Míchel (41 p.)	Amor (15)
127	8 January 1994	18	**Barcelona**	Real Madrid	5–0	Romário (24, 56, 81), Koeman (47), Iglesias (86)	
128	6 May 1994	37	Real Madrid	**Barcelona**	0–1		Amor (77)
129	6 January 1995	16	**Real Madrid**	Barcelona	5–0	Zamorano (5, 21, 39), Luis Enrique (68), Amavisca (70)	
130	26 May 1995	35	**Barcelona**	Real Madrid	1–0	Nadal (62)	
131	30 September 1995	5	Real Madrid	Barcelona	1–1	Raúl (12)	Roger (31)
132	9 February 1996	26	**Barcelona**	Real Madrid	3–0	Kodro (36, 89), Figo (71)	
133	7 December 1996	16	**Real Madrid**	Barcelona	2–0	Šuker (24), Mijatović (48)	
134	10 May 1997	37	**Barcelona**	Real Madrid	1–0	Ronaldo (44)	
135	1 November 1997	9	Real Madrid	**Barcelona**	2–3	Raúl (48), Šuker (61)	Rivaldo (5), Luis Enrique (50), Giovanni (79)
136	7 March 1998	28	**Barcelona**	Real Madrid	3–0	Anderson (69), Figo (80), Giovanni (85)	
137	19 September 1998	3	Real Madrid	Barcelona	2–2	Raúl (7, 25)	Kluivert (12), Anderson (82)
138	14 February 1999	22	**Barcelona**	Real Madrid	3–0	Luis Enrique (4, 36), Rivaldo (80)	
139	13 October 1999	7	Barcelona	Real Madrid	2–2	Rivaldo (28), Figo (49)	Raúl (26, 86)
140	26 February 2000	26	**Real Madrid**	Barcelona	3–0	Roberto Carlos (5), Anelka (19), Morientes (52)	
141	21 October 2000	6	**Barcelona**	Real Madrid	2–0	Luis Enrique (26), Simão (79)	
142	3 March 2001	25	Real Madrid	Barcelona	2–2	Raúl (6, 36)	Rivaldo (35, 69)
143	4 November 2001	11	**Real Madrid**	Barcelona	2–0	Morientes (23), Figo (89)	
144	16 March 2002	30	Barcelona	Real Madrid	1–1	Xavi (58)	Zidane (38)
145	23 November 2002	11	Barcelona	Real Madrid	0–0		
146	19 April 2003	30	Real Madrid	Barcelona	1–1	Ronaldo (15)	Luis Enrique (31)
147	6 December 2003	15	Barcelona	**Real Madrid**	1–2	Kluivert (82)	Roberto Carlos (36), Ronaldo (72)
148	25 April 2004	34	Real Madrid	**Barcelona**	1–2	Solari (53)	Kluivert (57), Xavi (86)
149	20 November 2004	12	**Barcelona**	Real Madrid	3–0	Eto'o (29), Van Bronckhorst (44), Ronaldinho (77 p.)	
150	10 April 2005	31	**Real Madrid**	Barcelona	4–2	Zidane (7), Ronaldo (20), Raúl (45+2), Owen (65)	Eto'o (29), Ronaldinho (73)
151	19 November 2005	12	Real Madrid	**Barcelona**	0–3		Eto'o (14), Ronaldinho (59, 77)
152	1 April 2006	31	Barcelona	Real Madrid	1–1	Ronaldinho (22 p.)	Ronaldo (37)
153	22 October 2006	7	**Real Madrid**	Barcelona	2–0	Raúl (3), Van Nistelrooy (51)	
154	10 March 2007	26	Barcelona	Real Madrid	3–3	Messi (11, 28, 90+1)	Van Nistelrooy (5, 13 p.), Ramos (73)
155	23 December 2007	17	Barcelona	**Real Madrid**	0–1		Baptista (36)
156	7 May 2008	36	**Real Madrid**	Barcelona	4–1	Raúl (13), Robben (21), Higuaín (63), Van Nistelrooy (78 p.)	Henry (87)
157	13 December 2008	15	**Barcelona**	Real Madrid	2–0	Eto'o (83), Messi (90)	
158	2 May 2009	34	Real Madrid	**Barcelona**	2–6	Higuaín (14), Ramos (56)	Henry (18, 58), Puyol (20), Messi (36, 75), Piqué (83)
159	29 November 2009	12	**Barcelona**	Real Madrid	1–0	Ibrahimović (56)	
160	10 April 2010	31	Real Madrid	**Barcelona**	0–2		Messi (33), Pedro (56)
161	29 November 2010	13	**Barcelona**	Real Madrid	5–0	Xavi (10), Pedro (18), Villa (55, 58), Jeffrén (90+1)	
162	16 April 2011	32	Real Madrid	Barcelona	1–1	C. Ronaldo (82 p.)	Messi (53 p.)
163	10 December 2011	16	Real Madrid	**Barcelona**	1–3	Benzema (1)	A. Sánchez (30), Xavi (53), Fàbregas (66)
164	21 April 2012	35	Barcelona	**Real Madrid**	1–2	A. Sánchez (71)	Khedira (17), C. Ronaldo (73)
165	7 October 2012	7	Barcelona	Real Madrid	2–2	Messi (31, 61)	C. Ronaldo (23, 66)
166	2 March 2013	26	**Real Madrid**	Barcelona	2–1	Benzema (6), Ramos (82)	Messi (18)
167	26 October 2013	10	**Barcelona**	Real Madrid	2–1	Neymar (19), A. Sánchez (78)	Jesé (90+1)
168	23 March 2014	29	Real Madrid	**Barcelona**	3–4	Benzema (20, 24), C. Ronaldo (55 p.)	Iniesta (7), Messi (42, 65 p., 84 p.)
169	25 October 2014	9	**Real Madrid**	Barcelona	3–1	C. Ronaldo (35 p.), Pepe (50), Benzema (61)	Neymar (4)
170	22 March 2015	28	**Barcelona**	Real Madrid	2–1	Mathieu (19), L. Suárez (56)	C. Ronaldo (31)
171	21 November 2015	12	Real Madrid	**Barcelona**	0–4		L. Suárez (11, 74), Neymar (39), Iniesta (53)
172	2 April 2016	31	Barcelona	**Real Madrid**	1–2	Piqué (56)	Benzema (62), C. Ronaldo (85)
173	3 December 2016	14	Barcelona	Real Madrid	1–1	L. Suárez (53)	Ramos (90)
174	23 April 2017	33	Real Madrid	**Barcelona**	2–3	Casemiro (28), Rodríguez (85)	Messi (33, 90+2), Rakitić (73)
175	23 December 2017	17	Real Madrid	**Barcelona**	0–3		L. Suárez (54), Messi (64 p.), Al. Vidal (90+3)
176	6 May 2018	36	Barcelona	Real Madrid	2–2	L. Suárez (10), Messi (52)	C. Ronaldo (14), Bale (72)
177	28 October 2018	10	**Barcelona**	Real Madrid	5–1	Coutinho (11), L. Suárez (30 p., 75, 83), Ar. Vidal (87)	Marcelo (50)
178	2 March 2019	26	Real Madrid	**Barcelona**	0–1		Rakitić (26)
179	18 December 2019	10	Barcelona	Real Madrid	0–0		
180	1 March 2020	26	**Real Madrid**	Barcelona	2–0	Vinícius (71), Díaz (90+2)	
181	24 October 2020	7	Barcelona	**Real Madrid**	1–3	Fati (8)	Valverde (5), Ramos (63 p.), Modrić (90)
182	10 April 2021	30	**Real Madrid**	Barcelona	2–1	Benzema (13), Kroos (28)	Mingueza (60)
183	24 October 2021	10	Barcelona	**Real Madrid**	1–2	Agüero (90+7)	Alaba (32), Vázquez (90+4)
184	20 March 2022	28	Real Madrid	**Barcelona**	0–4		Aubameyang (29, 51), Araújo (38), Torres (47)
185	16 October 2022	9	**Real Madrid**	Barcelona	3–1	Benzema (12), Valverde (35), Rodrygo (90+1 p.)	Torres (83)
186	19 March 2023	26	**Barcelona**	Real Madrid	2–1	Roberto (45), Kessié (90+1)	Araújo (9 o.g.)
187	28 October 2023	11	Barcelona	**Real Madrid**	1–2	Gündoğan (6)	Bellingham (68, 90+2)
188	21 April 2024	32	**Real Madrid**	Barcelona	3–2	Vinícius (18 p.), Vázquez (73), Bellingham (90+1)	Christensen (6), López (69)
189	26 October 2024	11	Real Madrid	**Barcelona**	0–4		Lewandowski (54, 56), Lamine Yamal (77), Raphinha (84)
190	11 May 2025	35	**Barcelona**	Real Madrid	4–3	E. García (19), Lamine Yamal (32), Raphinha (34, 45)	Mbappé (5 p., 14, 70)
191	26 October 2025	10	**Real Madrid**	Barcelona	2–1	Mbappé (22), Bellingham (43)	López (38)
192	10 May 2026	35	**Barcelona**	Real Madrid	2–0	Rashford (9), Torres (18)	
193	25 October 2026	10	Barcelona	**Real Madrid**	1–2	Raphinha (61)	Mbappé (41, 87)
194	9 May 2027	35	Real Madrid	Barcelona			

==== Summary ====
Real Madrid wins	81
Draws	35
Barcelona wins	77
Real Madrid goals	311
Barcelona goals	313
**Total matches**	193

Team	Home wins	Home draws	Home losses	GF	GA
Real Madrid	57	15	24	193	123
Barcelona	53	20	24	190	118

=== Copa del Rey matches ===
The Copa del Rey is the oldest competition in the history of Spanish football.

Season	Round		Home team	Away team	Score	Goals (home)	Goals (away)
1916	Semi-finals	First leg	**Barcelona**	Real Madrid	**2–1**	Alcántara (39), Martínez (85)	Petit (17)
1916	Semi-finals	Second leg	**Real Madrid**	Barcelona	**4–1**	Bernabéu (35 p., 40, 60), Petit (80)	Martínez (20)
1916	Semi-finals	1st (R)	Real Madrid	Barcelona	**6–6** (a.e.t.)	Belaunde (2, 55, 87), Bernabéu (23, 98, 118 p.)	Alcántara (15, 30, 102), Mallorquí (67), Bau (70), Martínez (112)
1916	Semi-finals	2nd (R)	**Real Madrid**	Barcelona	**4–2** (a.e.t.)	Bernabéu (25), Zabalo (85), Aranguren (100, 108)	Martínez (11, 38)
1926	Quarter-finals	First leg	Real Madrid	**Barcelona**	**1–5**	Monjardín (47)	Samitier (19, 26, 43, 64), Piera (79)
1926	Quarter-finals	Second leg	**Barcelona**	Real Madrid	**3–0**	Piera (8), Samitier (18, 51)	
1936	Final		**Real Madrid**	Barcelona	**2–1**	Eugenio (6), Lécue (12)	Escolà (29)
1943	Semi-finals	First leg	**Barcelona**	Real Madrid	**3–0**	Valle Mas (34), Escolá (43 p.), Sospedra (60)	
1943	Semi-finals	Second leg	**Real Madrid**	Barcelona	**11–1**	Pruden (5, 28, 35), Barinaga (31, 43, 44, 87), Alonso (37, 74), Alsúa (39), Botella (87)	Martín (89)
1954	Semi-finals	First leg	**Real Madrid**	Barcelona	**1–0**	Mateos (86)	
1954	Semi-finals	Second leg	**Barcelona**	Real Madrid	**3–1**	César (9, 12), Biosca (87)	Pérez Payá (72)
1957	Quarter-finals	First leg	Real Madrid	Barcelona	**2–2**	Di Stéfano (20 p., 35)	Kubala (14), Basora (53)
1957	Quarter-finals	Second leg	**Barcelona**	Real Madrid	**6–1**	Martínez (4, 48, 50, 63), Kubala (35), Villaverde (79)	Olivella (19 o.g.)
1958–59	Semi-finals	First leg	Real Madrid	**Barcelona**	**2–4**	Puskas (20), Mateos (35)	Kocsis (51, 69), Luis Suárez (67, 71)
1958–59	Semi-finals	Second leg	**Barcelona**	Real Madrid	**3–1**	Luis Suárez (34 p., 44), Villaverde (63)	Gento (36)
1961–62	Quarter-finals	First leg	Real Madrid	**Barcelona**	**0–1**		Martínez (62)
1961–62	Quarter-finals	Second leg	Barcelona	**Real Madrid**	**1–3**	Pereda (85)	Del Sol (65), Puskas (83), Gento (90)
1967–68	Final		Real Madrid	**Barcelona**	**0–1**		Zunzunegui (6 o.g.)
1969–70	Quarter-finals	First leg	**Real Madrid**	Barcelona	**2–0**	Grosso (5), Amancio (44)	
1969–70	Quarter-finals	Second leg	Barcelona	Real Madrid	**1–1**	Rexach (45)	Amancio (60 p.)
1973–74	Final		**Real Madrid**	Barcelona	**4–0**	Santillana (5), Rubiñán (46), Aguilar (50), Pirri (83)	
1982–83	Final		**Barcelona**	Real Madrid	**2–1**	Víctor (32), Marcos (89)	Santillana (50)
1989–90	Final		**Barcelona**	Real Madrid	**2–0**	Amor (68), Salinas (90)	
1992–93	Semi-finals	First leg	Real Madrid	Barcelona	**1–1**	Zamorano (40)	Bakero (30)
1992–93	Semi-finals	Second leg	Barcelona	**Real Madrid**	**1–2**	Laudrup (87)	Míchel (24 p.), Zamorano (82)
1996–97	Round of 16	First leg	**Barcelona**	Real Madrid	**3–2**	Ronaldo (13), Nadal (70), Giovanni (78)	Šuker (16), Hierro (67)
1996–97	Round of 16	Second leg	Real Madrid	Barcelona	**1–1**	Šuker (80 p.)	Roberto Carlos (69 o.g.)
2010–11	Final		Barcelona	**Real Madrid**	**0–1** (a.e.t.)		C. Ronaldo (103)
2011–12	Quarter-finals	First leg	Real Madrid	**Barcelona**	**1–2**	C. Ronaldo (11)	Puyol (49), Abidal (77)
2011–12	Quarter-finals	Second leg	Barcelona	Real Madrid	**2–2**	Pedro (43), Dani Alves (45+3)	C. Ronaldo (68), Benzema (72)
2012–13	Semi-finals	First leg	Real Madrid	Barcelona	**1–1**	Varane (81)	Fàbregas (50)
2012–13	Semi-finals	Second leg	Barcelona	**Real Madrid**	**1–3**	Alba (89)	C. Ronaldo (13, 57 p.), Varane (68)
2013–14	Final		**Real Madrid**	Barcelona	**2–1**	Di María (11), Bale (85)	Bartra (69)
2018–19	Semi-finals	First leg	Barcelona	Real Madrid	**1–1**	Malcom (57)	Vázquez (6)
2018–19	Semi-finals	Second leg	Real Madrid	**Barcelona**	**0–3**		L. Suárez (50, 73 p.), Varane (69 o.g.)
2022–23	Semi-finals	First leg	Real Madrid	**Barcelona**	**0–1**		Militão (26 o.g.)
2022–23	Semi-finals	Second leg	Barcelona	**Real Madrid**	**0–4**		Vinícius (45+1), Benzema (50, 58 p., 80)
2024–25	Final		**Barcelona**	Real Madrid	**3–2** (a.e.t.)	Pedri (28), Torres (84), Koundé (116)	Mbappé (70), Tchouaméni (77)

==== Summary ====
Real Madrid wins	13
Draws	8
Barcelona wins	17
Real Madrid goals	71
Barcelona goals	71
**Total matches**	38

Team	Home wins	Home draws	Home losses	Other venue wins
Real Madrid	5	5	6 (Note: Not including the loss in the 1968 Copa del Generalísimo final, which was held at the Santiago Bernabéu Stadium, as it was technically a neutral venue.)	4
Barcelona	7	3	4	4

=== Copa de la Liga matches ===
The Copa de la Liga was a tournament created in 1982, but low support from the participating clubs saw it disbanded four years later.

Season	Round		Home team	Away team	Score	Goals (home)	Goals (away)
1982–83	Final	First leg	Real Madrid	Barcelona	**2–2**	Del Bosque (62), Juanito (68 p.)	Carrasco (53), Maradona (57)
1982–83	Final	Second leg	**Barcelona**	Real Madrid	**2–1**	Maradona (19 p.), Alexanko (25)	Santillana (80)
1984–85	Quarter-finals	First leg	Barcelona	Real Madrid	**2–2**	Clos (40), Marcos (44)	Valdano (67), Juanito (75)
1984–85	Quarter-finals	Second leg	Real Madrid	Barcelona	**1–1** (4–1 p.)	Valdano (83)	Moratalla (57)
1985–86	Second round	First leg	Barcelona	Real Madrid	**2–2**	Clos (24), Archibald (50)	Pardeza (36), Cholo (52)
1985–86	Second round	Second leg	Real Madrid	**Barcelona**	**0–4**		Amarilla (2, 41), Urbano (47), Esteban (67)

==== Summary ====
Real Madrid wins	0
Draws	4
Barcelona wins	2
Real Madrid goals	8
Barcelona goals	13
**Total matches**	6

Team	Home wins	Home draws	Home losses
Real Madrid	0	2	1
Barcelona	1	2	0

=== Supercopa de España matches ===
The Supercopa de España is a super cup competition. Between 1983 and 2017, it was a two-legged match between the previous season's La Liga and Copa del Rey winners. The current format was introduced in the 2019–20 edition, and now features four teams (the previous season's top two teams in La Liga, and the winners and runners-up of the Copa del Rey).

Season	Round	Home team	Away team	Score	Goals (home)	Goals (away)
1988–89	First leg	**Real Madrid**	Barcelona	**2–0**	Míchel (51), Hugo Sánchez (78)	
1988–89	Second leg	**Barcelona**	Real Madrid	**2–1**	Bakero (37, 78)	Butragueño (15)
1990–91	First leg	Barcelona	**Real Madrid**	**0–1**		Míchel (55)
1990–91	Second leg	**Real Madrid**	Barcelona	**4–1**	Butragueño (21, 44), Hugo Sánchez (56), Aragón (70)	Goikoetxea (20)
1993–94	First leg	**Real Madrid**	Barcelona	**3–1**	Alfonso (33, 85), Zamorano (55)	Stoichkov (15)
1993–94	Second leg	Barcelona	Real Madrid	**1–1**	Bakero (65)	Zamorano (21)
1997–98	First leg	**Barcelona**	Real Madrid	**2–1**	Nadal (11), Giovanni (85 p.)	Raúl (5)
1997–98	Second leg	**Real Madrid**	Barcelona	**4–1**	Raúl (42, 54), Mijatović (58), Seedorf (65)	Giovanni (80)
2011–12	First leg	Real Madrid	Barcelona	**2–2**	Özil (13), Alonso (54)	Villa (36), Messi (45)
2011–12	Second leg	**Barcelona**	Real Madrid	**3–2**	Iniesta (15), Messi (45, 88)	C. Ronaldo (20), Benzema (81)
2012–13	First leg	**Barcelona**	Real Madrid	**3–2**	Pedro (57), Messi (70 p.), Xavi (78)	C. Ronaldo (55), Di María (85)
2012–13	Second leg	**Real Madrid**	Barcelona	**2–1**	Higuaín (11), C. Ronaldo (19)	Messi (45)
2017–18	First leg	Barcelona	**Real Madrid**	**1–3**	Messi (77 p.)	Piqué (50 o.g.), C. Ronaldo (80), Asensio (90)
2017–18	Second leg	**Real Madrid**	Barcelona	**2–0**	Asensio (4), Benzema (39)	
2021–22	Semi-finals	Barcelona	**Real Madrid**	**2–3** (a.e.t.)	L. de Jong (41), Fati (83)	Vinícius (25), Benzema (72), Valverde (98)
2022–23	Final	Real Madrid	**Barcelona**	**1–3**	Benzema (90+3)	Gavi (33), Lewandowski (45), Pedri (69)
2023–24	Final	**Real Madrid**	Barcelona	**4–1**	Vinícius (7, 10, 39 p.), Rodrygo (64)	Lewandowski (33)
2024–25	Final	Real Madrid	**Barcelona**	**2–5**	Mbappé (5), Rodrygo (60)	Lamine Yamal (22), Lewandowski (36 p.), Raphinha (39, 48), Balde (45+10)
2025–26	Final	**Barcelona**	Real Madrid	**3–2**	Raphinha (36, 73), Lewandowski (45+4)	Vinícius (45+2), G. García (45+6)

==== Summary ====
Real Madrid wins	10
Draws	2
Barcelona wins	7
Real Madrid goals	42
Barcelona goals	32
**Total matches**	19

Team	Home wins	Home draws	Home losses	Other venue wins
Real Madrid	6	1	0	2
Barcelona	4	1	2	3

=== Copa de la Coronación ===
The Copa de la Coronación is an official tournament recognized by the Spanish Football Federation, but is not recognized as part of the Copa del Rey tournament.

Date	Round	Stadium	Home team	Away team	Score	Goals (home)	Goals (away)
13 May 1902	Semi-finals	Hipódromo	Real Madrid	**Barcelona**	**1–3**	Johnson (?)	Steinberg (?, ?), Gamper (?)

==== Summary ====
Real Madrid wins	0
Draws	0
Barcelona wins	1
Real Madrid goals	1
Barcelona goals	3
**Total matches**	1

Team	Home wins	Home draws	Home losses	Other venue wins
Real Madrid	0	0	0	0
Barcelona	0	0	0	1

=== UEFA Champions League matches ===
In Europe's most prestigious continental tournament, Barcelona and Real Madrid have faced each other on several occasions. The Champions League was known as the European Cup prior to 1992.

Season	Round		Home team	Away team	Score	Goals (home)	Goals (away)
1959–60	Semi-finals	First leg	**Real Madrid**	Barcelona	3–1	Di Stéfano (17, 84), Puskás (28)	Martínez (37)
1959–60	Semi-finals	Second leg	Barcelona	**Real Madrid**	1–3	Kocsis (89)	Puskás (25, 75), Gento (68)
1960–61	First round	First leg	Real Madrid	Barcelona	2–2	Mateos (3), Gento (33)	Luis Suárez (27, 87 p.)
1960–61	First round	Second leg	**Barcelona**	Real Madrid	2–1	Vergés (33), Evaristo (82)	Canário (87)
2001–02	Semi-finals	First leg	Barcelona	**Real Madrid**	0–2		Zidane (55), McManaman (90+2)
2001–02	Semi-finals	Second leg	Real Madrid	Barcelona	1–1	Raúl (43)	Helguera (49 o.g.)
2010–11	Semi-finals	First leg	Real Madrid	**Barcelona**	0–2		Messi (77, 87)
2010–11	Semi-finals	Second leg	Barcelona	Real Madrid	1–1	Pedro (54)	Marcelo (64)

==== Summary ====
Real Madrid wins	3
Draws	3
Barcelona wins	2
Real Madrid goals	13
Barcelona goals	10
**Total matches**	8

Team	Home wins	Home draws	Home losses
Real Madrid	1	2	1
Barcelona	1	1	2

=== Summary of all competitive matches ===
Real Madrid wins	107
Draws	52
Barcelona wins	106
Real Madrid goals	446
Barcelona goals	442
Total matches	265

Team	Home wins	Home draws	Home losses	Other venue wins
Real Madrid	69	25	32	6
Barcelona	66	27	32	8

== Friendlies and other matches ==
Real Madrid and Barcelona have played 43 friendly matches. Before the start of La Liga championship in 1929, the two clubs played exhibition matches and friendlies on a more frequent basis than after the national league commenced. After 1929, such games have been tributes or part of pre-season tournaments of a friendly nature. The last friendly match took place on 3 August 2024.

Date	Tournament	Round	Stadium	Home team	Away team	Score	Goals (home)	Goals (away)
13 May 1906	Exhibition game		Camp del carrer Muntaner	**Barcelona**	Real Madrid	5–2	C. Wallace 2x, Ponz 2x, Forns	Meléndez, Revuelto
24 December 1911	Exhibition game		L'Escopidora (Industria)	**Barcelona**	Real Madrid	3–1	Bernhard Staub (25, 55), Alfredo Massana	Perea (4)
26 December 1911	Exhibition game		L'Escopidora (Industria)	Barcelona	Real Madrid	3–3	Joan Llonch, Pepe Rodríguez, Bernhard Staub	
1 November 1913	Exhibition game		L'Escopidora (Industria)	**Barcelona**	Real Madrid	7–0	Carlier 3x, Alcántara, P. Wallace 2x, Greenwell	
2 November 1913	Exhibition game		L'Escopidora (Industria)	**Barcelona**	Real Madrid	1–0	Alcántara (40)	
6 January 1914	Exhibition game		L'Escopidora (Industria)	Real Madrid	Barcelona	2–2	Bernabéu 2x	P. Wallace, Allack
11 January 1914	Exhibition game		Campo de O'Donnell	Real Madrid	**Barcelona**	0–2		Alcántara, Allack
5 March 1916	Exhibition game		L'Escopidora (Industria)	**Barcelona**	Real Madrid	3–0	Vinyals 2x, Martínez	
7 March 1916	Exhibition game		L'Escopidora (Industria)	Barcelona	Real Madrid	0–0		
21 April 1917	Copa Foronda	First leg	Campo de O'Donnell	**Real Madrid**	Barcelona	3–1	Bernabéu 2x, Sansinenea	Martínez
23 April 1917	Copa Foronda	Second leg	Campo de O'Donnell	Real Madrid	Barcelona	0–0		
1 November 1917	Exhibition game		L'Escopidora (Industria)	**Barcelona**	Real Madrid	3–0	Vinyals 2x, Sagi	
4 November 1917	Exhibition game		L'Escopidora (Industria)	**Barcelona**	Real Madrid	4–1	Vinyals, Hormeu, Sagi, Gumbau	Machimbarrena
17 May 1918	Exhibition game		Campo de O'Donnell	Real Madrid	**Barcelona**	1–2	Bernabéu	Alcántara, Martínez
15 February 1920	Exhibition game		L'Escopidora (Industria)	Barcelona	Real Madrid	2–2	Alcántara, Sancho (p.)	Coma (o.g.), Mieg
18 February 1920	Exhibition game		L'Escopidora (Industria)	**Barcelona**	Real Madrid	7–1	Alcántara 3x, Vinyals, Sancho, Plaza, Lakatos	Mieg
11 January 1921	Exhibition game		L'Escopidora (Industria)	**Barcelona**	Real Madrid	3–0	Gràcia 2x, Piera	
15 March 1922	Exhibition game		Campo de O'Donnell	Real Madrid	Barcelona	2–2	Monjardín (40, ?)	Martinez (5), Gràcia (10)
17 October 1922	Exhibition game		Campo de Delicias	**Barcelona**	Real Madrid	5–2	Samitier (10), Alcántara, Gracia 2x, Torralba (85)	Torres (2), Quesada (p.)
18 October 1922	Exhibition game		Campo de Delicias	**Barcelona**	Real Madrid	4–2	Martinez (6), Grácia, Alcántara 2x	Urbina (10, ?)
2 February 1927	Exhibition game		Les Corts	Barcelona	Real Madrid	0–0		
19 March 1927	Exhibition game		Chamartín	Real Madrid	**Barcelona**	1–5	Quesada (12)	Pedrol (14, 73), Sagi (16), Samitier (35, 58)
20 March 1927	Exhibition game		Chamartín	Real Madrid	**Barcelona**	1–4	Félix Pérez (80)	Sastre (43, 75), Pedrol (50), Quesada (51 o.g.)
27 May 1928	Torneo de Campeones	First leg	Les Corts	Barcelona	Real Madrid	2–2	Ramon (6), Arocha (58)	Benegas (23), Esparza (80)
3 June 1928	Torneo de Campeones	Second leg	Chamartín	Real Madrid	Barcelona	1–1	Rubio (32)	Arocha (87)
3 July 1932	Exhibition game		Les Corts	Barcelona	Real Madrid	2–2	Samitier (39, 67)	Hilario (22), Olivares (54)
25 November 1934	Exhibition game		Chamartín	**Real Madrid**	Barcelona	5–1	Gurruchaga (15), Lazcano (47, 89), Regueiro (51, 57 p.)	Ramon (79)
15 September 1940	Exhibition game		Les Corts	**Barcelona**	Real Madrid	5–4	Va (4, 49), Vergara (9), Valle Mas (48), Bravo (73)	Barinaga (12, 78), Alday (46), Dindurra (67)
8 June 1941	Exhibition game		Chamartín	Real Madrid	**Barcelona**	2–3	Arbiza (32), Alsúa (38)	Bravo (7), Raich (28), Escolà (75)
31 October 1943	Juan Monjardín Tribute		Chamartín	Real Madrid	Barcelona	1–1	J. Alonso (48)	Betancourt (20)
26 December 1943	Antonio Franco Tribute		Les Corts	**Barcelona**	Real Madrid	4–0	Martín (13, 37, 40), Bravo (52)	
23 May 1948	Torneo Históricos	First leg	Les Corts	**Barcelona**	Real Madrid	1–0	Amorós (37)	
30 May 1948	Torneo Históricos	Second leg	Nuevo Chamartín	Real Madrid	**Barcelona**	0–1		Amorós (49)
31 August 1957	Partido de la Amistad		Santiago Bernabéu	**Real Madrid**	Barcelona	2–1	Rial (61), Miguel (65)	Martínez (9)
30 August 1959	Ramón de Carranza Trophy	Final	Ramón de Carranza	Barcelona	**Real Madrid**	3–4	Czibor (12), Villaverde (71), Evaristo (79)	Puskás (39, 78), Gento (55), Di Stéfano (58)
31 August 1968	Ramón de Carranza Trophy	Semi-finals	Ramón de Carranza	Real Madrid	**Barcelona**	1–2	Gento (59)	Juanito Mariana (24), Zaldúa (86)
30 May 1982	Venezuela Cup	3rd place	Farid Richa	**Real Madrid**	Barcelona	1–0	Del Bosque (10)	
1 May 1991	Desafío Total Canal+	First leg	Santiago Bernabéu	**Real Madrid**	Barcelona	3–1	Butragueño (16), Hierro (17), Villarroya (18)	Goikoetxea (38)
11 September 1991	Desafío Total Canal+	Second leg	Camp Nou	Barcelona	Real Madrid	1–1	Nadal (67)	Aldana (72)
29 July 2017	International Champions Cup		Hard Rock Stadium	Real Madrid	**Barcelona**	2–3	Kovačić (14), Asensio (36)	Messi (3), Rakitić (7), Piqué (50)
23 July 2022	Soccer Champions Tour		Allegiant Stadium	Real Madrid	**Barcelona**	0–1		Raphinha (27)
29 July 2023	Soccer Champions Tour		AT&T Stadium	**Barcelona**	Real Madrid	3–0	Dembélé (15), López (85), Torres (90+1)	
3 August 2024	Soccer Champions Tour		MetLife Stadium	Real Madrid	**Barcelona**	1–2	Paz (82)	Víctor (42, 54)

=== Summary ===
Real Madrid wins	6
Draws	12
Barcelona wins	25
Real Madrid goals	56
Barcelona goals	106
**Total matches**	43

== Summary of all matches ==
Real Madrid wins	113
Draws	64
Barcelona wins	131
Real Madrid goals	502
Barcelona goals	548
Total matches	308

== Reserve teams matches ==
Barcelona Atlètic was founded as the Barcelona's reserve team in 1970 with the merger of Condal (Barcelona's previous reserve team) and Atlètic Catalunya. Castilla was founded as Real Madrid's reserve team in 1972, after the folding of A.D. Plus Ultra (Real Madrid's previous reserve team). Both teams would meet for the first time during the third round of the 1974–75 Copa del Generalísimo and then again during the 1982–83 Segunda División season.

The reserve teams normally meet only when both are competing in the second tier, as they are placed in different regional groups at lower levels, and they are not permitted to enter the Copa del Rey.

Season	Round	Home team	Away team	Score	Goals (home)	Goals (away)
1974–75 Copa del Generalísimo	Third round – 1st leg	**Barcelona Atlètic**	Castilla CF	**2–0**	Luis Sánchez Pérez (43), Duran (88)	
1974–75 Copa del Generalísimo	Third round – 2nd leg	**Castilla CF**	Barcelona Atlètic	**3–2**	Magdaleno (9, 37, 42)	Adam (28 o.g.), Antonio Olmo (87)
1982–83 Segunda División	14th	Castilla	Barcelona Atlètic	**1–1**	López Pérez (86)	Paco Clos (43)
1982–83 Segunda División	33rd	**Barcelona Atlètic**	Castilla	**2–0**	Paco Clos (63, 67)	
1983–84 Segunda División	9th	Barcelona Atlètic	**Castilla**	**0–1**		Butragueño (63 p.)
1983–84 Segunda División	28th	**Castilla CF**	Barcelona Atlètic	**3–0**	Francis Rodríguez (47), Alejandro López Ufarte (60), Míchel (89)	
1984–85 Segunda División	2nd	Castilla	**Barcelona Atlètic**	**0–4**		Villarroya (21, 79), Carlos Muñoz (26, 56)
1984–85 Segunda División	21st	**Barcelona Atlètic**	Castilla	**2–1**	Nacho Martín (4), Vinyals (75)	Julià (68)
1985–86 Segunda División	2nd	**Barcelona Atlètic**	Castilla	**4–0**	Manolo Muñoz (17, 51), Casals (56), Villarroya (69)	
1985–86 Segunda División	21st	**Castilla**	Barcelona Atlètic	**1–0**	Pinki (37)	
1986–87 Segunda División	17th	**Barcelona Atlètic**	Castilla	**1–0**	Sergi López (27)	
1986–87 Segunda División	34th	Castilla	Barcelona Atlètic	**2–2**	Losada (47 p.), Pinki (90 p.)	Tomy (34), Nayim (58 p.)
1987–88 Segunda División	6th	Barcelona Atlètic	**Castilla**	**2–3**	Campuzano (68), Martín Domínguez (90 p.)	Aldana (32), Gay (41), Rosagro (87 p.)
1987–88 Segunda División	25th	Castilla	**Barcelona Atlètic**	**1–2**	Edu Vílchez (37 p.)	Luis Milla (66), Martín Domínguez (80)
1988–89 Segunda División	17th	**Castilla**	Barcelona Atlètic	**3–2**	Rosagro (15, 20, 25 p.)	Raigón (63), Linde (75)
1988–89 Segunda División	36th	Barcelona Atlètic	Castilla	**2–2**	Villena (29 p.), Tomy (38)	Hurtado (32), Rosagro (86)
1989–1991	There were no matches between the teams as they each played at different divisions. For the 1989–90 season, Barcelona B was relegated to 2ªB, followed a year later by Real Madrid B for the 1990–91 season. Both teams returned to 2ª for the 1991–92 season.					
1991–92 Segunda División	1st	**Real Madrid B**	Barcelona B	**1–0**	Esnáider (55)	
1991–92 Segunda División	20th	Barcelona B	Real Madrid B	**3–3**	Carreras (45, 58 p.), Óscar (47)	Luengo (63), Velasco (75), Vallina (78)
1992–93 Segunda División	3rd	**Real Madrid B**	Barcelona B	**2–1**	Esnáider (60, 73)	Christiansen (64)
1992–93 Segunda División	22nd	Barcelona B	Real Madrid B	**2–2**	Gonzalo (24), Carreras (79 p.)	Esnáider (17, 73 p.)
1993–94 Segunda División	9th	**Real Madrid B**	Barcelona B	**3–1**	Dani (6, 39), Morales (43)	Óscar (79 p.)
1993–94 Segunda División	28th	Barcelona B	Real Madrid B	**1–1**	Bakero (46)	Gerardo (84)
1994–95 Segunda División	6th	**Barcelona B**	Real Madrid B	**4–1**	Celades (9), Cembranos (19), Cruyff (35, 57)	Pedro (73)
1994–95 Segunda División	25th	Real Madrid B	**Barcelona B**	**1–2**	Jaime (47)	Toni Velamazán (75), Bakero (80)
1995–96 Segunda División	18th	**Real Madrid B**	Barcelona B	**2–0**	Morán (62), Zeferino (67)	
1995–96 Segunda División	37th	Barcelona B	**Real Madrid B**	**1–3**	García Pimienta (50)	Gómez (2), Jaime (20 p.), Iván Pérez (61)
1996–97 Segunda División	12th	Barcelona B	**Real Madrid B**	**1–2**	Jon Bakero (11)	Javi Guerrero (35, 53)
1996–97 Segunda División	31st	**Real Madrid B**	Barcelona B	**1–0**	Irurzun (89)	
1998 Segunda División B play-offs	5th	**Barcelona B**	Real Madrid B	**5–0**	Puyol (18), Ismael (21), Gabri (26), Rosas (42), Mateu (45)	
1998 Segunda División B play-offs	6th	Real Madrid B	**Barcelona B**	**0–2**		Luis García (70), Miguel Ángel (78)
1998–2012	After the 1996–97 season, both teams were relegated to 2ªB. During the following seasons, there were no matches between them as they each played at different divisions, each having returned to 2ª at different moments in the past, but never together. Both teams met again for the first time during the 2nd round of the 2012–13 season.					
2012–13 Segunda División	2nd	**Real Madrid Castilla**	Barcelona B	**3–2**	Juanfran (12), Cheryshev (25), Sergi Gómez (47 o.g.)	Mejías (39 o.g.), Sergi Roberto (70 p.)
2012–13 Segunda División	23rd	**Barcelona B**	Real Madrid Castilla	**3–1**	Araujo (65, 69), Deulofeu (79 p.)	Morata (35)
2013–14 Segunda División	5th	**Barcelona B**	Real Madrid Castilla	**2–0**	Sandro (23), Nieto (27 p.)	
2013–14 Segunda División	26th	**Real Madrid Castilla**	Barcelona B	**3–1**	Burgui (37), Aguza (43), Mascarell (58 p.)	Suárez (35)
2014–2021	There were no matches between the teams as they each played at different divisions. For the 2014–15 season, Real Madrid B was relegated to 2ªB, followed a year later by Barcelona B for the 2015–16 season. During the following seasons, there were no matches between them as they each played at different divisions or groups. Both teams met again for the first time in the third tier under the new Spanish football league system for the 2021–22.					
2021–22 Primera División RFEF	8th	Real Madrid Castilla	Barcelona B	0–0		
2021–22 Primera División RFEF	27th	Barcelona B	Real Madrid Castilla	2–2	Matheus (69), Escobar (90+5)	Latasa (24, 48)
2023 Primera Federación play-offs	Semifinal 4 – 1st leg	**Barcelona Atlètic**	Real Madrid Castilla	**4–2**	Riad (19), Roberto Fernández (43), Cruz (76, 80)	Paz (13), Dotor (68 p.)
2023 Primera Federación play-offs	Semifinal 4 – 2nd leg	**Real Madrid Castilla**	Barcelona Atlètic	**3–0**	Dotor (21), Bravo (78), Arribas (90+5 p.)	

=== Summary ===
Real Madrid Castilla wins	16
Draws	8
Barcelona Atlètic wins	14
Real Madrid Castilla goals	57
Barcelona Atlètic goals	65
**Total matches**	38

Team	Home wins	Home draws	Home losses
Real Madrid Castilla	12	3	4
Barcelona Atlètic	10	5	4

== Copa del Rey matches between first teams and reserve teams ==
Until 1990, reserve teams could participate in the Copa del Rey, so there was a possibility that one of the two Clásico teams would face the other team's reserves in the competition, which happened on two occasions, once with Real Madrid against Barcelona Atlètic, and once with Barcelona against Real Madrid Castilla, with the senior teams winning both times.

Season	Round		Home team	Away team	Score	Goals (home)	Goals (away)
1980–81	R16	First leg	Castilla	**Barcelona**	**3–5**	Ortiz (9), Paco, (51), Blanco (57)	Landáburu (5), Quini (13), Zuviría (65), Migueli (69), Simonsen (85)
1980–81	R16	Second leg	**Barcelona**	Castilla	**4–1**	Quini (3, 47), Esteban (15), Landáburu (89)	Paco (55)
1983–84	R16	First leg	Barcelona Atlètic	Real Madrid	**0–0**		
1983–84	R16	Second leg	**Real Madrid**	Barcelona Atlètic	**1–0**	Santillana (43)	

== See also ==
- El Clásico (basketball)
