= 2022–23 Sevilla FC season =

Sevilla FC
2022–23 season
- President: José Castro Carmona
- Head coach: Julen Lopetegui (until 5 October); Jorge Sampaoli (from 6 October to 21 March); José Luis Mendilibar (from 21 March)
- Stadium: Ramón Sánchez Pizjuán
- La Liga: 12th
- Copa del Rey: Quarter-finals
- UEFA Champions League: Group stage
- UEFA Europa League: Winners
- Top goalscorer: League: Youssef En-Nesyri (8); All: Youssef En-Nesyri (18)
- Highest home attendance: 40,233 vs Barcelona (3 September 2022)
- Lowest home attendance: 33,991 vs Valladolid (19 August 2022)
- Biggest win: Linares 0–5 Sevilla
- Biggest defeat: Atlético Madrid 6–1 Sevilla
Home colours	Away colours	Third colours

The 2022–23 season was the 116th season in the history of Sevilla FC and their 22nd consecutive season in the top flight. The club participated in La Liga, the Copa del Rey, the UEFA Champions League, and the UEFA Europa League, winning the latter competition for a record seventh time.

== Players ==
=== First-team squad ===
As of 31 January 2023.

Note: Flags indicate national team as defined under FIFA eligibility rules; some limited exceptions apply. Players may hold more than one non-FIFA nationality.

No.	Pos.	Nation	Player
1	GK	SRB	Marko Dmitrović
2	DF	ARG	Gonzalo Montiel
3	DF	BRA	Alex Telles (on loan from Manchester United)
4	DF	NED	Karim Rekik
5	FW	ARG	Lucas Ocampos
6	MF	SRB	Nemanja Gudelj
7	FW	ESP	Suso
8	MF	ESP	Joan Jordán
9	FW	MEX	Jesús Corona
10	MF	CRO	Ivan Rakitić (vice-captain)
11	FW	BEL	Adnan Januzaj
12	FW	ESP	Rafa Mir
13	GK	MAR	Yassine Bounou

No.	Pos.	Nation	Player
14	DF	FRA	Tanguy Nianzou
15	FW	MAR	Youssef En-Nesyri
16	DF	ESP	Jesús Navas (captain)
17	FW	ARG	Erik Lamela
18	MF	SEN	Pape Gueye (on loan from Marseille)
19	DF	ARG	Marcos Acuña
20	MF	BRA	Fernando (3rd captain)
21	MF	ESP	Óliver Torres
22	DF	FRA	Loïc Badé (on loan from Rennes)
23	DF	BRA	Marcão
24	MF	ARG	Alejandro Gómez
25	FW	ESP	Bryan Gil (on loan from Tottenham Hotspur)

=== Reserve squad ===
Note: Flags indicate national team as defined under FIFA eligibility rules; some limited exceptions apply. Players may hold more than one non-FIFA nationality.

No.	Pos.	Nation	Player
26	DF	ESP	Pablo Pérez
27	FW	ESP	Carlos Álvarez

No.	Pos.	Nation	Player
31	GK	ESP	Alberto Flores
36	GK	ESP	Matías Árbol

=== Out on loan ===
Note: Flags indicate national team as defined under FIFA eligibility rules; some limited exceptions apply. Players may hold more than one non-FIFA nationality.

No.	Pos.	Nation	Player
—	GK	ESP	Alfonso Pastor (at Castellón until 30 June 2023)
—	DF	ESP	José Ángel Carmona (at Elche until 30 June 2023)
—	DF	SWE	Ludwig Augustinsson (at Aston Villa until 30 June 2023)
—	MF	ESP	Juanlu (at Mirandés until 30 June 2023)
—	MF	ESP	Luismi Cruz (at Barcelona B until 30 June 2023)
—	MF	DEN	Thomas Delaney (at 1899 Hoffenheim until 30 June 2023)
—	MF	ESP	Óscar Rodríguez (at Celta Vigo until 30 June 2023)

No.	Pos.	Nation	Player
—	MF	POR	Rony Lopes (at Troyes until 30 June 2023)
—	FW	ESP	Antonio Zarzana (at Marítimo until 30 June 2023)
—	FW	ESP	David Santisteban (at San Roque de Lepe until 30 June 2023)
—	FW	ESP	Iván Romero (at Tenerife until 30 June 2023)
—	FW	MAR	Oussama Idrissi (at Feyenoord until 30 June 2023)
—	DF	ESP	Kike Salas (at Tenerife until 30 June 2023)

== Transfers ==
=== In ===
Date	Player	From	Type	Fee	Ref.
30 June 2022	(Spain) Óscar	Getafe	Loan return		
30 June 2022	(Spain) Juan Berrocal	Sporting Gijón	Loan return		
30 June 2022	(Spain) Alejandro Pozo	Almería	Loan return		
30 June 2022	(Portugal) Rony Lopes	(Greece) Olympiacos	Loan return		
30 June 2022	(Morocco) Oussama Idrissi	Cádiz	Loan return		
30 June 2022	(Netherlands) Luuk de Jong	Barcelona	Loan return		
1 July 2022	(Spain) José Ángel Carmona	Sevilla Atlético	Promotion		
1 July 2022	(Spain) Kike Salas	Sevilla Atlético	Promotion		
11 July 2022	(Brazil) Marcão	(Turkey) Galatasaray	Transfer	€15M	
4 August 2022	(Brazil) Alex Telles	(England) Manchester United	Loan		
8 August 2022	(Spain) Isco	Real Madrid	Transfer	Free	
17 August 2022	(France) Tanguy Nianzou	(Germany) Bayern Munich	Transfer	€16M	
31 August 2022	(Belgium) Adnan Januzaj	Real Sociedad	Transfer	Free	
1 September 2022	(Denmark) Kasper Dolberg	(France) Nice	Loan (Note: Includes an option to sign permanently.)		
4 January 2023	(France) Loïc Badé	(France) Rennes	Loan		
17 January 2023	(Argentina) Lucas Ocampos	(Netherlands) Ajax	Loan return		
30 January 2023	(Senegal) Pape Gueye	(France) Marseille	Loan		
30 January 2023	(Spain) Bryan Gil	(England) Tottenham Hotspur	Loan		

=== Out ===
Date	Player	To	Type	Fee	Ref.
1 June 2022	(Brazil) Diego Carlos	(England) Aston Villa	Transfer	€31M	
6 June 2022	(Spain) Alejandro Pozo	Almería	Buyout clause	€3M	
1 July 2022	(France) Anthony Martial	(England) Manchester United	Loan return		
2 July 2022	(Netherlands) Luuk de Jong	(Netherlands) PSV Eindhoven	Transfer	€3M	
7 July 2022	(Spain) Javi Díaz	Tenerife	Transfer	Free	
8 July 2022	(Spain) Óscar	Celta Vigo	Loan		
11 July 2022	(Sweden) Ludwig Augustinsson	(England) Aston Villa	Loan		
11 July 2022	(Spain) Juan Berrocal	Eibar	Transfer	Free	
27 July 2022	(Morocco) Oussama Idrissi	(Netherlands) Feyenoord	Loan		
29 July 2022	(France) Jules Koundé	Barcelona	Transfer	€50M	
8 August 2022	(Spain) Juanlu Sánchez	Mirandés	Loan		
10 August 2022	(Spain) Antonio Zarzana	(Portugal) Marítimo	Loan		
24 August 2022	(Portugal) Rony Lopes	(France) Troyes	Loan		
31 August 2022	(Morocco) Munir	Getafe	Transfer	Free	
31 August 2022	(Argentina) Lucas Ocampos	(Netherlands) Ajax	Loan		
31 August 2022	(Spain) Iván Romero	Tenerife	Loan		
21 December 2022	(Spain) Isco	Released			
2 January 2023	(Denmark) Kasper Dolberg	(France) Nice	Loan return		
11 January 2023	(Spain) José Ángel Carmona	Elche	Loan		
30 January 2023	(Denmark) Thomas Delaney	(Germany) 1899 Hoffenheim	Loan		
31 January 2023	(Spain) Kike Salas	Tenerife	Loan		

== Pre-season and friendlies ==
Win Draw Loss

16 July 2022 Coupang Play Series	Tottenham Hotspur (England)	1–1	(Spain) Sevilla	Suwon, South Korea
20:00 KST (UTC+9)	Kane 50'	Report	Rakitić 64'	Stadium: Suwon World Cup Stadium; Attendance: 43,998; Referee: Ko Hyung-jin (South Korea)

24 July 2022 Troféu Cinco Violinos	Sporting CP (Portugal)	1–1 (5–6 p)	(Spain) Sevilla	Lisbon, Portugal
19:45 WEST (UTC+1)	Tabata (yellow card) 55'; Paulinho 82'; Edwards (yellow card) 90'	Report	Corona 15'; Acuña (yellow card) 54'	Stadium: Estádio José Alvalade; Referee: António Nobre (Portugal)
	Penalties
	Porro (penalty scored); Gonçalves (penalty scored); Rochinha (penalty scored); Tabata (penalty scored); Edwards (penalty scored); Issahaku (penalty missed)		(penalty scored) Gudelj; (penalty scored) Ocampos; (penalty scored) Gómez; (penalty scored) Jordán; (penalty scored) Suso; (penalty scored) Montiel

27 July 2022 Friendly	Sevilla (Spain)	6–0	(France) Angers	Lagoa, Portugal
19:30 WEST (UTC+1)	Ocampos 11'; En-Nesyri 18'; Corona 57'; Lamela 65'; Torres 83'; Romero 87'	Report		Stadium: Estádio Municipal Bela Vista; Referee: Gonçales Fortes

30 July 2022 Emirates Cup	Arsenal (England)	6–0	(Spain) Sevilla	Holloway, England
12:30 BST (UTC+1)	Saka 10' (pen.), 19'; Gabriel Jesus 13', 15', 76'; Nketiah 89'	Report	Salas (yellow card) 73'	Stadium: Emirates Stadium; Referee: Andrew Madley (England)

31 July 2022 Friendly	Leicester City (England)	1–0	(Spain) Sevilla	Leicester, England
18:00 BST (UTC+1)	Dewsbury-Hall 68'	Report	Montiel (yellow card) 51'; Munir (yellow card) 65'; Jordán (yellow card) 74'; Salas (yellow card) 82'	Stadium: King Power Stadium; Referee: Stuart Attwell (England)

6 August 2022 Antonio Puerta Trophy	Sevilla (Spain)	1–0	(Spain) Cádiz	Seville
21:00 CEST (UTC+2)	Delaney 68'	Report	Eyong (yellow card) 11'	Stadium: Ramón Sánchez Pizjuán; Referee: Mario Melero López

7 December 2022 Friendly	Sevilla (Spain)	1–1	(France) Monaco	Seville
20:00 CET (UTC+1)	Álvarez (yellow card) 69'; Ortiz 73'	Report	Martins 59'	Stadium: Ramón Sánchez Pizjuán; Referee: Jorge Figueroa Vázquez (Spain)

11 December 2022 Friendly	Benfica (Portugal)	0–1	(Spain) Sevilla	Faro/Loulé, Portugal
17:00 WET (UTC±0)	Veríssimo (yellow card) 66'; Gilberto (yellow card) 88'	Report	Rakitić 61'; Romero (yellow card) 81'	Stadium: Estádio Algarve; Referee: Miguel Nogueira (Portugal)

15 December 2022 Friendly	Sevilla (Spain)	7–0	(Netherlands) Volendam	Seville
18:30 CET (UTC+1)	Gudelj 6', 41'; Mir 21', 42'; Fernando (yellow card) 34'; Álvarez 37'; Quintana 85', 90+2'	Report		Stadium: Estadio Jesús Navas; Attendance: 0 Referee: Juan Antonio Manrique Antequera (Spain)

== Competitions ==
=== Overall record ===
Competition	First match	Last match	Starting round	Final position	Record							
Competition	First match	Last match	Starting round	Final position	Pld	W	D	L	GF	GA	GD	Win %
La Liga	12 August 2022	4 June 2023	Matchday 1	12th	38	13	10	15	47	54	−7	34.21
Copa del Rey	13 November 2022	25 January 2023	First round	Quarter-finals	5	4	0	1	12	2	+10	80.00
UEFA Champions League	6 September 2022	2 November 2022	Group stage	Group stage	6	1	2	3	6	12	−6	16.67
UEFA Europa League	16 February 2023	31 May 2023	Knockout round play-offs	Winners	9	4	3	2	14	8	+6	44.44
Total					58	22	15	21	79	76	+3	37.93

Source: Soccerway

=== La Liga ===
==== League table ====
Pos	Team	Pld	W	D	L	GF	GA	GD	Pts	Qualification or relegation
10	Girona	38	13	10	15	58	55	+3	49 (Note: Head-to-head points: Girona 8, Rayo Vallecano 6, Sevilla 1.)	
11	Rayo Vallecano	38	13	10	15	45	53	−8	49	
12	Sevilla	38	13	10	15	47	54	−7	49	Qualification for the Champions League group stage (Note: Sevilla qualified for the 2023–24 UEFA Champions League by winning the 2022–23 UEFA Europa League.)
13	Celta Vigo	38	11	10	17	43	53	−10	43	
14	Cádiz	38	10	12	16	30	53	−23	42 (Note: Head-to-head points: Cádiz 8, Getafe 5, Valencia 3.)	

Source: LaLiga Santander
Rules for classification: 1) Points; 2) Head-to-head points; 3) Head-to-head goal difference; 4) Goal difference; 5) Goals scored; 6) Fair-play points (Note: Head-to-head record is used only after all the matches between the teams in question have been played)

==== Results summary ====
Overall								Home						Away					
Pld	W	D	L	GF	GA	GD	Pts	W	D	L	GF	GA	GD	W	D	L	GF	GA	GD
38	13	10	15	47	54	−7	49	7	5	7	24	25	−1	6	5	8	23	29	−6

Source: La Liga

==== Results by round ====
Round	1	2	3	4	5	6	7	8	9	10	11	12	13	14	15	16	17	18	19	20	21	22	23	24	25	26	27	28	29	30	31	32	33	34	35	36	37	38
Ground	A	H	A	H	A	A	H	H	A	H	A	H	A	H	A	H	A	H	H	A	H	A	H	A	H	A	A	H	A	H	A	H	H	A	H	A	H	A
Result	L	D	L	L	W	D	L	D	W	D	L	L	D	L	D	W	L	W	W	L	W	D	L	L	W	L	W	D	W	W	W	L	W	W	D	D	L	L
Position	14	13	15	17	16	15	17	18	14	12	15	18	17	18	18	17	19	15	13	16	12	12	14	17	13	14	13	13	13	12	11	11	11	10	9	10	11	12

Source: La Liga
A = Away; H = Home; W = Win; D = Draw; L = Loss

==== Matches ====
The league fixtures were announced on 23 June 2022.

12 August 2022 1	Osasuna	2–1	Sevilla	Pamplona
21:00 CEST (UTC+2)	Ávila 9', (yellow card) 68'; D. García (yellow card) 34'; U. García (yellow card) 50'; Oroz 74' (pen.); Herrera (yellow card) 90+2'; Gómez (yellow card) 90+3'	Report	Mir 11'; Gómez (yellow card) 72'; Fernando (yellow card) 83'; Romero (yellow card) 90+5'	Stadium: El Sadar; Attendance: 18,536; Referee: Carlos del Cerro Grande

19 August 2022 2	Sevilla	1–1	Valladolid	Seville
22:00 CEST (UTC+2)	Montiel (yellow card) 68'; Rekik 86'; Ocampos (yellow card) 87'; Acuña (red card) 88'; Isco (yellow card) 90+9'	Report	Anuar 80'; Pérez (yellow card) 83'; El Yamiq (red card) 88'; Olaza (yellow card) 90+4'	Stadium: Ramón Sánchez Pizjuán; Attendance: 33,991; Referee: Juan Luis Pulido Santana

27 August 2022 3	Almería	2–1	Sevilla	Almería
22:00 CEST (UTC+2)	Eguaras (yellow card) 33'; Ramazani 42'; Sadiq 55'; Kaiky (yellow card) 71'; De la Hoz (yellow card) 78'; Baptistão (yellow card) 84'; Samú (yellow card) 90+1'	Report	Lamela (yellow card) 12'; Rekik (yellow card) 15'; Torres 30'; Mir (yellow card) 45'; Navas (yellow card) 49'; Carmona (yellow card) 70'; Isco (yellow card) 78'; Delaney (yellow card) 80'; Telles (yellow card) 83'	Stadium: Power Horse Stadium; Attendance: 13,788; Referee: Jesús Gil Manzano

3 September 2022 4	Sevilla	0–3	Barcelona	Seville
21:00 CEST (UTC+2)	Jordán (yellow card) 33'; Carmona (yellow card) 66'	Report	Dembélé (yellow card) 9'; Raphinha 21'; Balde (yellow card) 28'; Lewandowski 36'; García 50'; Araújo (yellow card) 75'; Roberto (yellow card) 89'	Stadium: Ramón Sánchez Pizjuán; Attendance: 40,233; Referee: Antonio Mateu Lahoz

10 September 2022 5	Espanyol	2–3	Sevilla	Cornellà de Llobregat
16:15 CEST (UTC+2)	Gil (yellow card) 13'; Joselu (yellow card) 42', (goal) 45+4' (pen.); Vinícius (yellow card) 58'; Braithwaite 62'; D. Gómez (yellow card) 90+6'	Report	Lamela 1', (yellow card) 29' (yellow-red card) 84'; Carmona 26', 45'; Acuña (yellow card) 45+2'; Fernando (yellow card) 90+4'; En-Nesyri (yellow card) 90+6'	Stadium: RCDE Stadium; Attendance: 20,135; Referee: Guillermo Cuadra Fernández

18 September 2022 6	Villarreal	1–1	Sevilla	Valencia
16:15 CEST (UTC+2)	Baena (yellow card) 41', (goal) 51'	Report	Torres 8'; Bounou (yellow card) 26'; Acuña (yellow card) 38'; Gudelj (yellow card) 45'; Carmona (yellow card) 60'; Telles (yellow card) 69'	Stadium: Ciutat de València; Attendance: 18,292; Referee: Alejandro Hernández Hernández

1 October 2022 7	Sevilla	0–2	Atlético Madrid	Seville
18:30 CEST (UTC+2)	Isco (yellow card) 11'; Delaney (yellow card) 31'; Gudelj (yellow card) 81'	Report	Llorente 29'; Witsel (yellow card) 38'; Morata 57'; Félix (yellow card) 90+3'	Stadium: Ramón Sánchez Pizjuán; Attendance: 37,754; Referee: Ricardo de Burgos Bengoetxea

8 October 2022 8	Sevilla	1–1	Athletic Bilbao	Seville
18:30 CEST (UTC+2)	Torres 4'; Isco (yellow card) 38'; Telles (yellow card) 39'; Carmona (yellow card) 58'; Acuña (yellow card) 72'	Report	Vesga 73'; Herrera (red card) 90+4'	Stadium: Ramón Sánchez Pizjuán; Attendance: 36,502; Referee: Jesús Gil Manzano

15 October 2022 9	Mallorca	0–1	Sevilla	Palma
18:30 CEST (UTC+2)	Ruiz de Galarreta (yellow card) 36'; Rodríguez (yellow card) 90+5'	Report	Montiel (yellow card) 28'; Marcão (yellow card) 35'; Lamela (yellow card) 45+1'; Gudelj 53'	Stadium: Visit Mallorca Stadium; Attendance: 15,300; Referee: Javier Iglesias Villanueva

18 October 2022 10	Sevilla	1–1	Valencia	Seville
19:00 CEST (UTC+2)	Delaney (yellow card) 64'; Salas (yellow card) 79', (red card) 90+11'; Lamela 86'; Rakitić (yellow card) 90+4'; Gómez (yellow card) 90+11'	Report	Cavani 6'; Lino (yellow card) 59'; Foulquier (yellow card) 63'; González (yellow card) 79'; Kluivert (yellow card) 85'; Diakhaby (yellow card) 90+4'; Marcos André (yellow card) 90+4'; Gayà (yellow card) 90+7', (penalty missed) 90+12'	Stadium: Ramón Sánchez Pizjuán; Attendance: 37,353; Referee: César Soto Grado

22 October 2022 11	Real Madrid	3–1	Sevilla	Madrid
21:00 CEST (UTC+2)	Modrić 5'; Tchouaméni (yellow card) 37'; Vázquez 79'; Valverde 81'	Report	Jordán (yellow card) 28'; Montiel (yellow card) 32'; Lamela 54'; Gudelj (yellow card) 66'; Gómez (yellow card) 90+5'	Stadium: Santiago Bernabéu; Attendance: 59,625; Referee: Alejandro Hernández Hernández

29 October 2022 12	Sevilla	0–1	Rayo Vallecano	Seville
18:30 CEST (UTC+2)	Isco (yellow card) 68'; Bounou (yellow card) 76'; Dmitrović (yellow card) 78'; Suso (yellow card) 79'; Navas (yellow card) 86'; Marcão (yellow card) 90+3'	Report	Á. García 61'; Catena (yellow card) 63'	Stadium: Ramón Sánchez Pizjuán; Attendance: 36,601; Referee: Antonio Mateu Lahoz

6 November 2022 13	Real Betis	1–1	Sevilla	Seville
21:00 CET (UTC+1)	Navas 43' (o.g.); Carvalho (yellow card) 45+3'; Fekir (red card) 45+3'; Iglesias (red card) 49'; Luiz Henrique (yellow card) 83'; Moreno (yellow card) 88'; Bravo (yellow card) 90'	Report	Montiel (red card) 38'; Acuña (yellow card) 38'; Lamela (yellow card) 66'; Gómez (yellow card) 70'; Gudelj (yellow card) 75', (goal) 81'; Telles (yellow card) 83'	Stadium: Benito Villamarín; Attendance: 54,034; Referee: José María Sánchez Martínez

9 November 2022 14	Sevilla	1–2	Real Sociedad	Seville
19:00 CET (UTC+1)	Rakitić (red card) 28'; Nianzou (red card) 34'; Navas (yellow card) 34'; Torres (yellow card) 40'; Mir 44'	Report	Sørloth 20'; Méndez 36'; Zubeldia (yellow card) 46'; Pacheco (yellow card) 90'	Stadium: Ramón Sánchez Pizjuán; Attendance: 34,814; Referee: Carlos del Cerro Grande

30 December 2022 15	Celta Vigo	1–1	Sevilla	Vigo
19:15 CET (UTC+1)	Beltrán (yellow card) 15'; Veiga 33'; Mallo (yellow card) 79'	Report	Carmona (yellow card) 9' (yellow-red card) 86'; Jordán (yellow card) 30'; Salas 54'; Lamela (yellow card) 89'	Stadium: Balaídos; Attendance: 13,653; Referee: Ricardo de Burgos Bengoetxea

8 January 2023 16	Sevilla	2–1	Getafe	Seville
18:30 CET (UTC+1)	Acuña 36'; Nianzou (yellow card) 45+3'; Rakitić (yellow card) 61'; Mir 80'; Álvarez (yellow card) 90'	Report	Alderete (yellow card) 32'; Mayoral (yellow card) 73', (goal) 87'; Portu (yellow card) 83'	Stadium: Ramón Sánchez Pizjuán; Attendance: 35,389; Referee: Juan Martínez Munuera

14 January 2023 17	Girona	2–1	Sevilla	Girona
16:15 CET (UTC+1)	López (yellow card) 36'; Toni (yellow card) 45'; Stuani 46'; Martínez (yellow card) 68'; Herrera 88'	Report	Nianzou 13'; Acuña (yellow card) 45'	Stadium: Estadi Montilivi; Attendance: 12,035; Referee: Valentín Pizarro Gómez

21 January 2023 18	Sevilla	1–0	Cádiz	Seville
21:00 CET (UTC+1)	Lamela (yellow card) 33'; Rakitić 89' (pen.)	Report	Espino (yellow card) 34'; Sobrino (yellow card) 45'; Alejo (yellow card) 83' (yellow-red card) 87'	Stadium: Ramón Sánchez Pizjuán; Attendance: 37,400; Referee: Alejandro Hernández Hernández

28 January 2023 19	Sevilla	3–0	Elche	Seville
18:30 CET (UTC+1)	En-Nesyri 29', 45+4'; Acuña 43'; Ocampos (yellow card) 80'	Report	Bigas (red card) 41'; Fidel (yellow card) 44'; Mascarell (yellow card) 79'; Gumbau (yellow card) 79'	Stadium: Ramón Sánchez Pizjuán; Attendance: 35,616; Referee: César Soto Grado

5 February 2023 20	Barcelona	3–0	Sevilla	Barcelona
21:00 CET (UTC+1)	Alba 58'; Gavi 70'; Raphinha 79'	Report	Rakitić (yellow card) 45+1'; Jordán (yellow card) 75'	Stadium: Camp Nou; Attendance: 77,987; Referee: José María Sánchez Martínez

11 February 2023 21	Sevilla	2–0	Mallorca	Seville
18:30 CET (UTC+1)	En-Nesyri 28'; Gil 40', (yellow card) 71'; Montiel (yellow card) 83'; Jordán (yellow card) 85'; Gudelj (yellow card) 90'	Report	Lee (yellow card) 36'; Baba (yellow card) 59'	Stadium: Ramón Sánchez Pizjuán; Attendance: 35,203; Referee: Javier Iglesias Villanueva

19 February 2023 22	Rayo Vallecano	1–1	Sevilla	Madrid
16:15 CET (UTC+1)	F. García (yellow card) 38'; Lejeune (yellow card) 49', (goal) 65'; Palazón (yellow card) 69'; Catena (yellow card) 90+4'	Report	Suso 29'; En-Nesyri (yellow card) 85'	Stadium: Vallecas; Attendance: 13,294; Referee: Jesús Gil Manzano

26 February 2023 23	Sevilla	2–3	Osasuna	Seville
21:00 CET (UTC+1)	Gueye (yellow card) 43'; Gudelj 63'; En-Nesyri 78', (yellow card) 90+4'; Acuña (yellow card) 79'; Ocampos (yellow card) 88'; Fernando (red card) 90+4'	Report	Oroz (yellow card) 12'; D. García 18'; Barja (yellow card) 65'; Fernando 67' (o.g.); Ezzalzouli 85'	Stadium: Ramón Sánchez Pizjuán; Attendance: 34,538; Referee: Juan Luis Pulido Santana

4 March 2023 24	Atlético Madrid	6–1	Sevilla	Madrid
21:00 CET (UTC+1)	Depay 23', 26'; Giménez (yellow card) 40'; Griezmann 53'; Carrasco 69'; Morata 76', 90+2'	Report	Gueye (yellow card) 25' (yellow-red card) 80'; En-Nesyri 39'; Acuña (yellow card) 55'; Rakitić (penalty missed) 74'; Montiel (yellow card) 81'	Stadium: Cívitas Metropolitano; Attendance: 57,737; Referee: Guillermo Cuadra Fernández

12 March 2023 25	Sevilla	2–1	Almería	Seville
16:15 CET (UTC+1)	Badé (yellow card) 32'; Ocampos 45+2' (pen.); Gudelj (yellow card) 71'; Lamela 73', (yellow card) 73'	Report	Akieme 2', (yellow card) 12'; Chumi (yellow card) 72'; Ely (yellow card) 83'; Baptistão (yellow card) 88'	Stadium: Ramón Sánchez Pizjuán; Attendance: 37,848; Referee: Ricardo de Burgos Bengoetxea

19 March 2023 26	Getafe	2–0	Sevilla	Getafe
18:30 CET (UTC+1)	Suárez (yellow card) 22'; Munir 50'; Villar (yellow card) 76'; Milla (yellow card) 81'; Álvarez (yellow card) 90+2'; Ünal 90+5'	Report	Jordán (yellow card) 20'; Badé (yellow card) 63'	Stadium: Coliseum Alfonso Pérez; Attendance: 12,253; Referee: Antonio Mateu Lahoz

1 April 2023 27	Cádiz	0–2	Sevilla	Cádiz
18:30 CEST (UTC+2)	Alejo (yellow card) 42'; Sobrino (yellow card) 56'; Parra (yellow card) 62'	Report	Badé (yellow card) 28'; Ocampos 51', (yellow card) 56'; Gil (yellow card) 59'; Gueye (yellow card) 65'; En-Nesyri 74'	Stadium: Nuevo Mirandilla; Attendance: 19,181; Referee: César Soto Grado

7 April 2023 28	Sevilla	2–2	Celta Vigo	Seville
21:00 CEST (UTC+2)	Gueye (yellow card) 6' (yellow-red card) 19'; En-Nesyri 43', (yellow card) 43'; Navas (yellow card) 63'; Acuña 81', (red card) 90+5'; Telles (yellow card) 83'; Montiel (yellow card) 90+5'	Report	Pérez (yellow card) 13'; Cervi (yellow card) 45+2'; Rodríguez 89'; Paciência 90+3'	Stadium: Ramón Sánchez Pizjuán; Attendance: 30,778; Referee: Valentín Pizarro Gómez

16 April 2023 29	Valencia	0–2	Sevilla	Valencia
21:00 CEST (UTC+2)	Moriba (red card) 84'; Duro (yellow card) 85'	Report	Ocampos (yellow card) 41'; Jordán (yellow card) 51'; Badé 55'; Suso 75'; Montiel (yellow card) 81'; Gudelj (yellow card) 90+3'	Stadium: Mestalla; Attendance: 39,654; Referee: Carlos del Cerro Grande

23 April 2023 30	Sevilla	2–1	Villarreal	Seville
21:00 CEST (UTC+2)	Mir 34'; Lamela (yellow card) 85'; En-Nesyri 90+4'	Report	Torres 57'; Foyth (yellow card) 70'; Mandi (yellow card) 73'	Stadium: Ramón Sánchez Pizjuán; Attendance: 29,635; Referee: Ricardo de Burgos Bengoetxea

26 April 2023 31	Athletic Bilbao	0–1	Sevilla	Bilbao
22:00 CEST (UTC+2)	Sancet (yellow card) 72'; Yeray (yellow card) 90'; R. García (yellow card) 90+2'	Report	Lamela (yellow card) 38'; Acuña (yellow card) 45'; Ocampos (yellow card) 81', (goal) 90+2' (pen.)	Stadium: San Mamés; Attendance: 42,716; Referee: Alejandro Hernández Hernández

30 April 2023 32	Sevilla	0–2	Girona	Seville
21:00 CEST (UTC+2)	Gudelj (yellow card) 4'; Acuña (yellow card) 90+6'	Report	Juanpe 23'; Castellanos 55'; Callens (yellow card) 84'	Stadium: Ramón Sánchez Pizjuán; Attendance: 35,560; Referee: Alejandro Muñiz Ruiz

4 May 2023 33	Sevilla	3–2	Espanyol	Seville
19:30 CEST (UTC+2)	Gil 22', (yellow card) 45+2'; Ocampos 69' (pen.); Gueye 88'	Report	Rekik 29' (o.g.); Puado 43'; Suárez (yellow card) 62'; Vinícius (yellow card) 90+1'	Stadium: Ramón Sánchez Pizjuán; Attendance: 35,391; Referee: Javier Alberola Rojas

14 May 2023 34	Valladolid	0–3	Sevilla	Valladolid
18:30 CEST (UTC+2)	Kike (yellow card) 45+4'; Torres (yellow card) 47'	Report	Mir 50'; Telles (yellow card) 64'; Gómez 78'; Corona 90+3'	Stadium: José Zorilla; Attendance: 21,580; Referee: Miguel Ángel Ortiz Arias

21 May 2023 35	Sevilla	0–0	Real Betis	Seville
21:00 CEST (UTC+2)	Montiel (yellow card) 33'; Rekik (yellow card) 45+1'	Report	Luiz Henrique (yellow card) 27'; Akouokou (yellow card) 83'; Miranda (red card) 87'	Stadium: Ramón Sánchez Pizjuán; Attendance: 41,392; Referee: Jesús Gil Manzano

24 May 2023 36	Elche	1–1	Sevilla	Elche
19:30 CEST (UTC+2)	Morente 25'; Milla (yellow card) 78'	Report	Lamela 10'; Gueye (red card) 18'; Fernando (yellow card) 60'; Navas (yellow card) 63'; Badé (yellow card) 73'; Gil (yellow card) 90+3'	Stadium: Martínez Valero; Attendance: 13,263; Referee: Isidro Díaz de Mera Escuderos

27 May 2023 37	Sevilla	1–2	Real Madrid	Seville
19:00 CEST (UTC+2)	Mir 3'; Acuña (red card) 83'; Jordán (yellow card) 90+1'; Torres (yellow card) 90+7'	Report	Rodrygo 29', 69'; Vázquez (yellow card) 33'; Tchouaméni (yellow card) 65'; Nacho (yellow card) 84'; Ceballos (yellow card) 90+1'	Stadium: Ramón Sánchez Pizjuán; Attendance: 29,856; Referee: César Soto Grado

4 June 2023 38	Real Sociedad	2–1	Sevilla	San Sebastián
18:30 CEST (UTC+2)	Méndez 28'; Cho 73'	Report	Hormigo (yellow card) 45'; Lamela 77'	Stadium: Reale Arena; Attendance: 35,065; Referee: Carlos del Cerro Grande

=== Copa del Rey ===
13 November 2022 First round	Velarde	0–2	Sevilla	Muriedas
16:00 CET (UTC+1)		Report	Nianzou 30'; Mir 90'	Stadium: La Maruca; Referee: Alejandro Muñiz Ruiz

21 December 2022 Second round	Juventud Torremolinos	0–3	Sevilla	Torremolinos
21:00 CET (UTC+1)	López (yellow card) 45'; Arrieta (yellow card) 62'; M. García (yellow card) 84'; Fernández (yellow card) 84'; Cano (yellow card) 84'	Report	Álvarez 31'; Jordán (yellow card) 46', (goal) 90+2'; Fernández 57' (o.g.)	Stadium: El Pozuelo; Attendance: 2,500; Referee: Isidro Díaz de Mera Escuderos

4 January 2023 Round of 32	Linares Deportivo	0–5	Sevilla	Linares
19:00 CET (UTC+1)		Report	En-Nesyri 37', 40', 74'; Squadrone 57' (o.g.); Lamela 69'	Stadium: Linarejos; Attendance: 9,500; Referee: Antonio Mateu Lahoz

17 January 2023 Round of 16	Alavés	0–1	Sevilla	Vitoria-Gasteiz
21:00 CET (UTC+1)	Jason (yellow card) 34'	Report	Rekik (yellow card) 24'; Gudelj (yellow card) 31'; Acuña (yellow card) 34'; Rakitić 48'; Badé (yellow card) 64'	Stadium: Mendizorrotza; Attendance: 12,217; Referee: César Soto Grado

25 January 2023 Quarter-finals	Osasuna	2–1 (a.e.t.)	Sevilla	Pamplona
22:00 CET (UTC+1)	Moncayola (yellow card) 30'; Ávila 71'; Gómez (yellow card) 90+2'; Ezzalzouli 99'	Report	Nianzou (yellow card) 31'; En-Nesyri 90+4'; Lamela (yellow card) 114'	Stadium: El Sadar; Attendance: 19,724; Referee: Ricardo de Burgos Bengoetxea

=== UEFA Champions League ===
==== Group stage ====
The group stage draw was held on 25 August 2022.

Pos	Team	Pld	W	D	L	GF	GA	GD	Pts	Qualification	MCI	DOR	SEV	CPH
1	(England) Manchester City	6	4	2	0	14	2	+12	14	Advance to knockout phase	—	2–1	3–1	5–0
2	(Germany) Borussia Dortmund	6	2	3	1	10	5	+5	9	Advance to knockout phase	0–0	—	1–1	3–0
3	(Spain) Sevilla	6	1	2	3	6	12	−6	5	Transfer to Europa League	0–4	1–4	—	3–0
4	(Denmark) Copenhagen	6	0	3	3	1	12	−11	3		0–0	1–1	0–0	—

Source: UEFA
Rules for classification: Group stage tiebreakers

6 September 2022 1	Sevilla (Spain)	0–4	(England) Manchester City	Seville
21:00 CEST (UTC+2)	Mir (yellow card) 89'	Report	Haaland 20', 67'; Foden 58'; Dias 90+2'	Stadium: Ramón Sánchez Pizjuán; Attendance: 38,764; Referee: Davide Massa (Italy)

14 September 2022 2	Copenhagen (Denmark)	0–0	(Spain) Sevilla	Copenhagen, Denmark
21:00 CEST (UTC+2)	Daramy (yellow card) 11'; Claesson (yellow card) 58'; Stamenic (yellow card) 82'	Report	Jordán (yellow card) 75'; Carmona (yellow card) 90+4'	Stadium: Parken Stadium; Attendance: 34,910; Referee: Irfan Peljto (Bosnia and Herzegovina)

5 October 2022 3	Sevilla (Spain)	1–4	(Germany) Borussia Dortmund	Seville
21:00 CEST (UTC+2)	Gudelj (yellow card) 3'; En-Nesyri 51'; Lamela (yellow card) 68'; Salas (yellow card) 90+1'	Report	Guerreiro 6'; Bellingham 41'; Adeyemi 43'; Özcan (yellow card) 69'; Brandt 75'	Stadium: Ramón Sánchez Pizjuán; Attendance: 34,598; Referee: Maurizio Mariani (Italy)

11 October 2022 4	Borussia Dortmund (Germany)	1–1	(Spain) Sevilla	Dortmund, Germany
21:00 CEST (UTC+2)	Bellingham 35'; Özcan (yellow card) 90'	Report	Nianzou 18'; Gudelj (yellow card) 84'; Carmona (yellow card) 90'; Bounou (yellow card) 90+4'	Stadium: Westfalenstadion; Attendance: 81,000; Referee: Srđan Jovanović (Serbia)

25 October 2022 5	Sevilla (Spain)	3–0	(Denmark) Copenhagen	Seville
18:45 CEST (UTC+2)	En-Nesyri 61'; Lamela (yellow card) 72'; Montiel (yellow card) 78', (goal) 90+2'; Isco 88'	Report	Claesson (yellow card) 69'; Sørensen (yellow card) 86'; Khocholava (red card) 90+5'	Stadium: Ramón Sánchez Pizjuán; Attendance: 29,884; Referee: Benoît Bastien (France)

2 November 2022 6	Manchester City (England)	3–1	(Spain) Sevilla	Manchester, England
20:00 GMT (UTC)	Lewis 52'; Álvarez 73'; Mahrez 83'	Report	Mir 31'	Stadium: City of Manchester Stadium; Attendance: 51,610; Referee: Orel Grinfeld (Israel)

=== UEFA Europa League ===
==== Knockout phase ====
===== Knockout round play-offs =====
The knockout round play-offs draw was held on 7 November 2022.

16 February 2023 First leg	Sevilla (Spain)	3–0	(Netherlands) PSV Eindhoven	Seville
21:00 CET (UTC+1)	En-Nesyri 45+2'; Ocampos 50'; Gudelj 55', (yellow card) 59'; Lamela (yellow card) 89'	Report		Stadium: Ramón Sánchez Pizjuán; Attendance: 29,593; Referee: Radu Petrescu (Romania)

23 February 2023 Second leg	PSV Eindhoven (Netherlands)	2–0 (2–3 agg.)	(Spain) Sevilla	Eindhoven, Netherlands
18:45 CET (UTC+1)	De Jong 77'; Mwene (yellow card) 84'; Silva 90+5'; Simons (yellow card) 90+6'; Mauro Júnior (red card) 90+7'	Report	Acuña (yellow card) 33'; Nianzou (yellow card) 79'; Dmitrović (yellow card) 82'; Mir (yellow card) 90+2'	Stadium: Philips Stadion; Attendance: 34,000; Referee: Daniele Orsato (Italy)

===== Round of 16 =====
The round of 16 draw was held on 24 February 2023.

9 March 2023 First leg	Sevilla (Spain)	2–0	(Turkey) Fenerbahçe	Seville
21:00 CET (UTC+1)	Telles (yellow card) 3'; Gil (yellow card) 45+3'; Jordán 56'; Lamela 85'	Report	Kadıoğlu (yellow card) 45+3'	Stadium: Ramón Sánchez Pizjuán; Attendance: 24,480; Referee: François Letexier (France)

16 March 2023 Second leg	Fenerbahçe (Turkey)	1–0 (1–2 agg.)	(Spain) Sevilla	Istanbul, Turkey
19:45 TRT (UTC+3)	Valencia 41' (pen.); Aziz (yellow card) 45+1'; Yüksek (yellow card) 89'	Report	Badé (yellow card) 45+2'; Jordán (yellow card) 89'	Stadium: Şükrü Saracoğlu Stadium; Attendance: 44,775; Referee: Michael Oliver (England)

===== Quarter-finals =====
The quarter-final draw was held on 17 March 2023.

13 April 2023 First leg	Manchester United (England)	2–2	(Spain) Sevilla	Manchester, England
20:00 BST (UTC+1)	Sabitzer 14', 21'; Fernandes (yellow card) 41'; Antony (yellow card) 65'; Pellistri (yellow card) 90'	Report	Montiel (yellow card) 11'; Rakitić (yellow card) 25'; Lamela (yellow card) 39'; Gudelj (yellow card) 58'; Acuña (yellow card) 72'; Malacia 84' (o.g.); Maguire 90+2' (o.g.)	Stadium: Old Trafford; Attendance: 72,825; Referee: Felix Zwayer (Germany)

20 April 2023 Second leg	Sevilla (Spain)	3–0 (5–2 agg.)	(England) Manchester United	Seville
21:00 CEST (UTC+2)	En-Nesyri 8', 81'; Badé 47'; Bounou (yellow card) 73'	Report	Casemiro (yellow card) 56'; Antony (yellow card) 59'; Shaw (yellow card) 90+3'	Stadium: Ramón Sánchez Pizjuán; Attendance: 41,974; Referee: Artur Soares Dias (Portugal)

===== Semi-finals =====
The semi-final draw was held on 17 March 2023, after the quarter-final draw.

11 May 2023 First leg	Juventus (Italy)	1–1	(Spain) Sevilla	Turin, Italy
21:00 CEST (UTC+2)	Rabiot (yellow card) 43'; Locatelli (yellow card) 77'; Chiesa (yellow card) 79'; Gatti 90+7'	Report	En-Nesyri 26'; Rakitić (yellow card) 72'; Gil (yellow card) 78'; Badé (yellow card) 82'; Lamela (yellow card) 90+3'	Stadium: Juventus Stadium; Attendance: 34,816; Referee: Daniel Siebert (Germany)

18 May 2023 Second leg	Sevilla (Spain)	2–1 (a.e.t.) (3–2 agg.)	(Italy) Juventus	Seville
21:00 CEST (UTC+2)	Acuña (yellow card) 57' (yellow-red card) 115'; Suso 71', (yellow card) 117'; Lamela 95'; Montiel (yellow card) 120+4'	Report	Kean (yellow card) 11'; Vlahović 65'; Danilo (yellow card) 105'; Paredes (yellow card) 117'	Stadium: Ramón Sánchez Pizjuán; Attendance: 42,186; Referee: Danny Makkelie (Netherlands)

===== Final =====
The final draw was held on 17 March 2023, after the quarter-final and semi-final draws, to determine the "home" team for administrative purposes.

31 May 2023 Final	Sevilla (Spain)	1–1 (a.e.t.) (4–1 p)	(Italy) Roma	Budapest, Hungary
21:00 CEST (UTC+2)	Mir (yellow card) 36'; Mancini 55' (o.g.); Rakitić (yellow card) 65'; Lamela (yellow card) 109'; Jordán (yellow card) 120'; Montiel (yellow card) 120+4'; Ocampos (yellow card) 120+10'	Report	Matić (yellow card) 21'; Dybala 35'; Pellegrini (yellow card) 45'; Mancini (yellow card) 48'; Cristante (yellow card) 65'; Çelik (yellow card) 74'; Zalewski (yellow card) 105'; Karsdorp (yellow card) 120+10'	Stadium: Puskás Aréna; Attendance: 61,476; Referee: Anthony Taylor (England)
	Penalties
	Ocampos (penalty scored); Lamela (penalty scored); Rakitić (penalty scored); Montiel (penalty scored)		(penalty scored) Cristante; (penalty missed) Mancini; (penalty missed) Ibañez

== Statistics ==
=== Squad appearances and goals ===
As of 4 June 2023

No.	Pos	Nat	Player	Total		La Liga		Copa del Rey		Champions League		Europa League	
No.	Pos	Nat	Player	Apps	Goals	Apps	Goals	Apps	Goals	Apps	Goals	Apps	Goals
Goalkeepers
1	GK	(Serbia) SRB	Marko Dmitrović	25	0	13+2	0	5	0	2	0	3	0
13	GK	(Morocco) MAR	Yassine Bounou	36	0	25	0	0+1	0	4	0	6	0
Defenders
2	DF	(Argentina) ARG	Gonzalo Montiel	43	1	17+11	0	4	0	2+2	1	2+5	0
3	DF	(Brazil) BRA	Alex Telles	38	0	15+12	0	0	0	4+2	0	4+1	0
4	DF	(Netherlands) NED	Karim Rekik	22	1	15+1	1	2+1	0	1	0	0+2	0
14	DF	(France) FRA	Tanguy Nianzou	30	3	16+3	1	4+1	1	2	1	4	0
16	DF	(Spain) ESP	Jesús Navas	49	0	21+11	0	1+4	0	3	0	7+2	0
19	DF	(Argentina) ARG	Marcos Acuña	44	3	21+9	3	3	0	1+2	0	8	0
22	DF	(France) FRA	Loïc Badé	27	2	16+3	1	2	0	0	0	6	1
23	DF	(Brazil) BRA	Marcão	10	0	4+1	0	0	0	0+2	0	2+1	0
44	DF	(Spain) ESP	Diego Hormigo	1	0	1	0	0	0	0	0	0	0
Midfielders
6	MF	(Serbia) SRB	Nemanja Gudelj	53	4	31+3	3	5	0	5+1	0	8	1
8	MF	(Spain) ESP	Joan Jordán	39	2	19+4	0	5	1	2+4	0	2+3	1
10	MF	(Croatia) CRO	Ivan Rakitić	51	2	21+10	1	5	1	6	0	9	0
18	MF	(Senegal) SEN	Pape Gueye	16	1	15+1	1	0	0	0	0	0	0
20	MF	(Brazil) BRA	Fernando	36	0	19+3	0	1+3	0	1	0	8+1	0
21	MF	(Spain) ESP	Óliver Torres	44	3	27+5	3	3+1	0	0	0	8	0
24	MF	(Argentina) ARG	Alejandro Gómez	27	1	11+8	1	0	0	3+2	0	0+3	0
28	MF	(Spain) ESP	Nacho Quintana	2	0	0	0	0+2	0	0	0	0	0
34	MF	(Spain) ESP	Pedro Ortiz	1	0	0+1	0	0	0	0	0	0	0
43	MF	(Spain) ESP	Manu Bueno	2	0	2	0	0	0	0	0	0	0
Forwards
5	FW	(Argentina) ARG	Lucas Ocampos	29	5	11+8	4	1	0	0	0	5+4	1
7	FW	(Spain) ESP	Suso	43	3	10+15	2	3+1	0	3+3	0	0+8	1
9	FW	(Mexico) MEX	Jesús Corona	4	1	1+3	1	0	0	0	0	0	0
12	FW	(Spain) ESP	Rafa Mir	36	8	16+10	6	2+2	1	1+2	1	1+2	0
15	FW	(Morocco) MAR	Youssef En-Nesyri	48	18	17+14	8	3+1	4	3+1	2	8+1	4
17	FW	(Argentina) ARG	Erik Lamela	49	9	20+12	6	3+1	1	2+3	0	2+6	2
25	FW	(Spain) ESP	Bryan Gil	24	2	10+7	2	0	0	0	0	6+1	0
27	FW	(Spain) ESP	Carlos Álvarez	3	1	0+1	0	1+1	1	0	0	0	0
Players who made an appearance this season but left the club
5	FW	(Denmark) DEN	Kasper Dolberg	8	0	2+2	0	0	0	3+1	0	0	0
11	FW	(Belgium) BEL	Adnan Januzaj	6	0	1+1	0	0+1	0	0+3	0	0	0
18	MF	(Denmark) DEN	Thomas Delaney	12	0	2+6	0	0	0	3+1	0	0	0
22	MF	(Spain) ESP	Isco	19	1	10+2	0	1	0	5+1	1	0	0
29	DF	(Spain) ESP	Kike Salas	10	1	4+2	1	1+1	0	2	0	0	0
30	DF	(Spain) ESP	José Ángel Carmona	15	2	5+5	2	0	0	5	0	0	0
36	FW	(Spain) ESP	Iván Romero	1	0	0+1	0	0	0	0	0	0	0
