= Solanas (surname) =

Solanas is a Spanish surname. Notable people with the surname include:

- Alberto Solanas (born 1995), Spanish athlete
- Fernando Solanas (1936–2020), Argentine film director
- Ignacio Martín Solanas (born 1962), Spanish footballer
- Juan Diego Solanas (born 1966), Argentine film director
- Valerie Solanas (1936–1988), American radical feminist infamous for attempting to assassinate Andy Warhol
