= Carlos Álvarez (footballer, born 2003) =

Spanish footballer (born 2003)

Personal information
- Full name: Carlos Álvarez Rivera
- Date of birth: 6 August 2003 (age 23)
- Place of birth: Sanlúcar la Mayor, Spain
- Height: 1.65 m (5 ft 5 in)
- Positions: Attacking midfielder; right winger

Team information
- Current team: América
- Number: 8

Youth career
- Diez de Sanlúcar
- 2011–2019: Sevilla

Senior career*
| Years | Team | Apps | (Gls) |
| 2019–2023 | Sevilla B | 84 | (4) |
| 2022–2023 | Sevilla | 1 | (0) |
| 2023–2026 | Levante | 102 | (13) |
| 2026– | América | 4 | (1) |

International career^{‡}
| 2019 | Spain U16 | 10 | (0) |
| 2019–2020 | Spain U17 | 9 | (1) |
| 2021– | Spain U19 | 6 | (0) |
- * Club domestic league appearances and goals as of 20 October 2026 ‡ National team caps and goals as of 8 January 2023

Carlos Álvarez Rivera (born 6 August 2003) is a Spanish professional footballer who plays as an attacking midfielder or right winger for Liga MX club América.

== Club career ==
=== Sevilla ===
Born in Sanlúcar la Mayor, Seville, Andalusia, Álvarez joined Sevilla FC's youth setup in 2011, from hometown side CD Diez de Sanlúcar. He renewed his contract with the club on 9 August 2019, and made his senior debut with the reserves at the age of 16 fifteen days later, coming on as a second-half substitute for Diego García in a 0–0 Segunda División B home draw against Yeclano Deportivo.

Álvarez scored his first senior goal on 13 February 2022, but in a 2–1 loss at CD Alcoyano in the Primera División RFEF. On 21 December, he scored on his first team debut, netting the opener in a 3–0 Copa del Rey win against Juventud de Torremolinos CF.

Álvarez made his La Liga debut on 8 January 2023, replacing Óliver Torres in a 2–1 home win against Getafe CF.

=== Levante ===
On 12 August 2023, Álvarez signed a four-year contract with Segunda División side Levante UD. Later that year, on 31 October, he scored his first goal in a 3–0 away win over Varea in the Copa del Rey.

=== América ===
In September 2026, Álvarez moved abroad to join América in Mexico's top division.

== International career ==
Álvarez is a youth international for Spain, having represented the Spain U16s, Spain U17s and Spain U19s.

== Honours ==
Levante

- Segunda División: 2024–25
