= Tanguy Nianzou =

French footballer (born 2002)

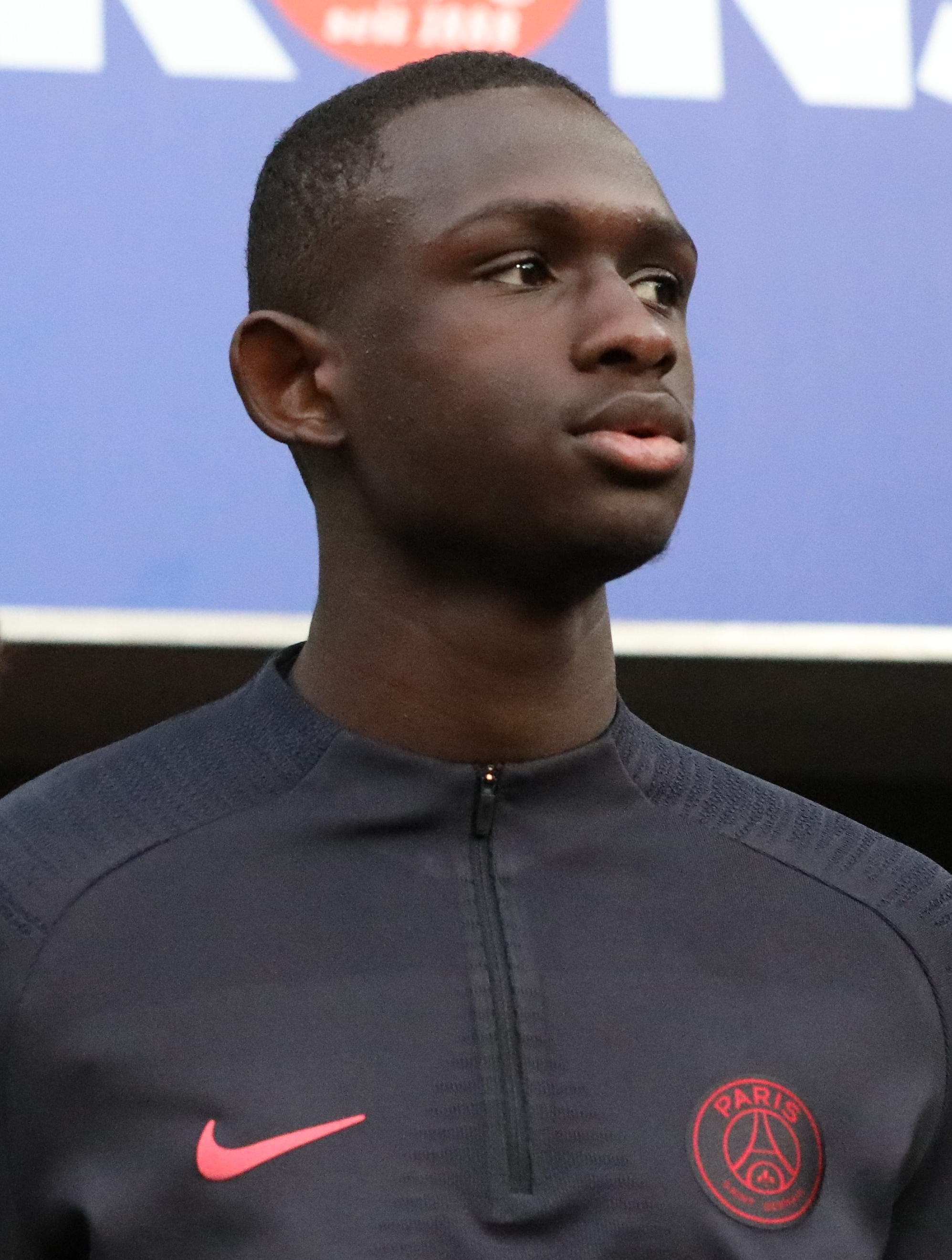
- Nianzou with Paris Saint-Germain in 2019

Personal information
- Full name: Nianzou Tanguy-Austin Kouassi
- Date of birth: 7 June 2002 (age 24)
- Place of birth: Paris, France
- Height: 1.91 m (6 ft 3 in)
- Position: Centre-back

Team information
- Current team: Lille
- Number: 23

Youth career
- 2008–2012: FC Épinay Athlético
- 2012–2013: Sénart-Moissy
- 2013–2016: Fontainebleau
- 2016–2019: Paris Saint-Germain

Senior career*
| Years | Team | Apps | (Gls) |
| 2019–2020 | Paris Saint-Germain | 6 | (2) |
| 2020–2022 | Bayern Munich | 23 | (1) |
| 2022–2026 | Sevilla | 45 | (1) |
| 2026– | Lille | 3 | (0) |

International career^{‡}
| 2017–2018 | France U16 | 11 | (4) |
| 2018–2019 | France U17 | 18 | (1) |
| 2019 | France U18 | 12 | (1) |
| 2021–2022 | France U20 | 10 | (1) |
| 2022–2024 | France U21 | 3 | (2) |
Medal record
Men's football
Representing France
FIFA U-17 World Cup
| Third place | 2019 |
UEFA European Under-17 Championship
| Bronze medal – third place | 2019 |
- * Club domestic league appearances and goals as of 30 October 2026 ‡ National team caps and goals as of 15 October 2024

Nianzou Tanguy-Austin Kouassi (born 7 June 2002), known as Tanguy Nianzou, is a French professional footballer who plays as a centre-back for Ligue 1 club Lille. He has represented France internationally at various youth levels.

== Early life ==
Nianzou Tanguy-Austin Kouassi was born on 7 June 2002 in Paris to Ivorian parents.

== Club career ==
=== Paris Saint-Germain ===
An academy graduate of Paris Saint-Germain (PSG), Nianzou made his professional debut on 7 December 2019 in a 3–1 league win against Montpellier. A few days later, he played in his first UEFA Champions League match as PSG were victorious 5–0 over Galatasaray.

Nianzou scored his first goal in a 3–0 Coupe de France win against Reims on 22 January 2020. This goal he scored was the 4,000th goal in PSG's history. He scored his first two Ligue 1 goals in an away game that ended in a 4–4 draw against Amiens on 15 February 2020. On 11 March, Nianzou played his final match for PSG, a 2–0 UEFA Champions League victory over Borussia Dortmund. He left the Parisian club upon the expiration of his contract, and signed for Bayern Munich on a free transfer.

=== Bayern Munich ===
On 1 July 2020, Bundesliga club Bayern Munich announced the signing of Nianzou on a four-year deal. He made his debut in a 3–1 league win against VfB Stuttgart on 28 November. On 12 December, Nianzou suffered a muscle injury, and was ruled out for one to two months. The injury was lingering from a previous injury that occurred at the beginning of the 2020–21 season. His return proved to come later than expected, as he appeared as a substitute in a 1–1 draw to Union Berlin on 10 April 2021. On 19 March 2022, he scored his only goal at the club in a 4–0 win over Union Berlin.

=== Sevilla ===
On 17 August 2022, Nianzou signed a five-year contract with Spanish club Sevilla. Two days later, Nianzou made his debut against Real Valladolid. On 11 October, he scored his first Champions League goal in a 1–1 away draw against Borussia Dortmund. On 14 January 2023, he scored his first La Liga goal in a 2–1 away defeat against Girona.

=== Lille ===
On 18 July 2026, Nianzou returned to France and signed a two-year contract with Lille.

== International career ==
Nianzou is a French youth international. He was part of French squad which reached semi-finals in 2019 UEFA European Under-17 Championship.

He was an important part of the French team which finished third at the 2019 FIFA U-17 World Cup. He started all seven of France's matches in the tournament and scored the equaliser in his team's 6–1 quarter-final win against Spain.

== Career statistics ==
As of match played 3 November 2026

Appearances and goals by club, season and competition
| Club | Season | League | | | National cup (Note: Includes Coupe de France, DFB-Pokal, Copa del Rey) | | League cup (Note: Includes Coupe de la Ligue) | | Europe | | Other | | Total | |
| Club | Season | Division | Apps | Goals | Apps | Goals | Apps | Goals | Apps | Goals | Apps | Goals | Apps | Goals |
|---|---|---|---|---|---|---|---|---|---|---|---|---|---|---|
| Paris Saint-Germain | 2019–20 | Ligue 1 | 6 | 2 | 3 | 0 | 2 | 1 | 2 (Note: Appearances in UEFA Champions League) | 0 | 0 | 0 | 13 | 3 |
| Bayern Munich | 2020–21 | Bundesliga | 6 | 0 | 0 | 0 | — | | 0 | 0 | 0 | 0 | 6 | 0 |
| Bayern Munich | 2021–22 | Bundesliga | 17 | 1 | 1 | 0 | — | | 4 | 0 | 0 | 0 | 22 | 1 |
| Bayern Munich | Total | | 23 | 1 | 1 | 0 | — | | 4 | 0 | 0 | 0 | 28 | 1 |
| Sevilla | 2022–23 | La Liga | 19 | 1 | 5 | 1 | — | | 6 (Note: Two appearances and one goal in UEFA Champions League, four appearances in UEFA Europa League) | 1 | — | | 30 | 3 |
| Sevilla | 2023–24 | La Liga | 8 | 0 | 4 | 0 | — | | 2 | 0 | 0 | 0 | 14 | 0 |
| Sevilla | 2024–25 | La Liga | 6 | 0 | 0 | 0 | — | | — | | — | | 6 | 0 |
| Sevilla | 2025–26 | La Liga | 12 | 0 | 0 | 0 | — | | — | | — | | 12 | 0 |
| Sevilla | Total | | 45 | 1 | 9 | 1 | — | | 8 | 1 | 0 | 0 | 62 | 3 |
| Lille | 2026–27 | Ligue 1 | 3 | 0 | 0 | 0 | — | | 2 | 0 | — | | 5 | 0 |
| Career total | | | 77 | 4 | 13 | 1 | 2 | 1 | 16 | 1 | 0 | 0 | 108 | 7 |

== Honours ==
Paris Saint-Germain

- Ligue 1: 2019–20
- Coupe de France: 2019–20
- Coupe de la Ligue: 2019–20

Bayern Munich

- Bundesliga: 2020–21, 2021–22
- DFL-Supercup: 2021, 2022

Sevilla

- UEFA Europa League: 2022–23

France U17

- FIFA U-17 World Cup third place: 2019

Individual

- Titi d'Or: 2019
- Maurice Revello Tournament Best XI: 2022
