= Marcial Arbiza =

Spanish footballer and engineer (1914–1992)

Personal information
- Full name: Marcial Arbiza Arruti
- Date of birth: 8 July 1914
- Place of birth: Urnieta, Gipuzkoa, Spain
- Date of death: 11 August 1992 (aged 78)
- Place of death: San Sebastián, Gipuzkoa, Spain
- Position: Forward

Senior career*
Years	Team	Apps	(Gls)
1935–1938	AS Hautmontoise		
1938–1939	Excelsior AC		
1939–1940	Real Unión		
1940–1941	Deportivo Alavés	17	(58)
1941–1943	Real Madrid	19	(17)
1943–1945	Real Sociedad	25	(10)
1945–1948	Real Unión	13	(10)
- * Club domestic league appearances and goals

Marcial Arbiza Arruti (8 July 1914 – 11 August 1992) was a Spanish industrial engineer and footballer who played as a forward for Real Unión, Real Madrid, and Real Sociedad.

== Education ==
His education began at the Maristas de San Bernardo de Irun school, where he shared a patio with other future footballers such as Ignacio Goyeneche (Real Sociedad and Valencia CF). When the Marist Brothers returned to France in 1928, he accompanied them to Bayonne as a boarding student. In the summer of 1930, he returned to Irun on vacation, and then, once he was 16, he used to line up with Real Unión in training matches, and friendly exhibitions. In the autumn of 1930, he went to Belgium to study Arts and Crafts.

== Career ==
His sports career began in France during the Spanish Civil War in the ranks of the modest AS Hautmont team, where he would share a dressing room with Sabino Aguirre, another Basque player. He was pivotal in helping the club to go from regional competitions to Ligue 2. In 1933 they faced a team from Budapest (MTK Budapest FC), which was practically the finalist team of the 1938 World Cup, and Arbiza scored to help his side to a victory, slotting it past Rudi Hiden, one of the great goalkeepers of that time, with a goal that was not only applauded from the stands, but described as fabulous by the French press. He eventually drew the attention of Excelsior AC of Roubaix, which he joined in 1939.

With the outbreak of World War II, he returned to Irun together with his wife and two children, with the supposed interest of playing for Real Sociedad, although he ultimately ended up signing for Real Unión, who at the time was struggling to stay in the Second División. At the town's border, he was arrested for political reasons, specifically under the accusation of having avoided enlistment, when shells whistled on this side of the Pyrenees. He was then taken prisoner to the Workers Battalion located in the Miranda de Ebro concentration camp, a pure euphemism under which conditions of slavery in concentration camps, systematic mistreatment, and countless humiliations were hidden.

Of course, Arbiza was very lucky among so many prisoners. Since he had played a few games with Deportivo Alavés during the 1934–35 campaign, his name was still taken into account by the club. Moreover, Alavés's manager was Patxi Gamborena, an Irunés player with whom he played occasionally during the summer of 1930, and he managed to sign him for Deportivo Alavés, which was seeking promotion to the 2nd Division. The club's board of directors was mostly military and they were the ones who allowed him to play with the team despite his seclusion. Arruti (he changed his football nickname, which until then was Arbiza, to Arruti, due to his criminal situation) made his debut for the team against Tolosa CF on 27 October 1940 at the Mendizorroza, scoring the opening goal in an eventual 2–0 win. He proved to be a lethal player scoring a whopping 58 goals in just 17 games, netting 5 and 4 goals per game on several occasions and even scoring a 6-goal haul once. His stage as an albiazul player lasted only three months, but his goals were decisive in helping the team get promoted to 2nd Division by qualifying second behind AD Ferroviaria. His goalscoring records eventually drew the attention of Real Madrid CF, who signed him at the end of the 1940–1941 league season to play in the Copa del Generalísimo.

He made his debut for the merengue team against Real Sociedad on 28 September 1941 at the Atotxa, scoring a goal in a 3–2 win. He played two seasons for Madrid, scoring 17 goals in 19 games, finished as runner-up in the league in 1942, and runner-up in the Copa del Generalísimo in 1943. Arbiza did not play the final, and without him, Real Madrid was defeated by Club Atlético de Bilbao, courtesy of an extra-time goal from Telmo Zarra.

In the summer of 1943, he signed for the newly promoted Real Sociedad, making his debut against Valencia on 26 September 1943, and scoring again, this time in a 2–4 loss. This would be his only goal in the whole season. He remained at Atocha for three seasons, all of them under Benito Díaz, experiencing relegation to the 2nd Division in 1943. Finally, he played his last active season at Real Unión (now in the 3rd Division), thus returning to the same town where he was arrested on his return to Spain.

== Later life ==
After abandoning football, he obtained the regional coach's card in 1949 in San Sebastián and the national coach in 1950 in Burgos. He died in San Sebastián on 11 August 1992, at the age of 78.

== Honours ==
Madrid CF

- La Liga runner-up: 1941–42
- Copa del Generalísimo runner-up: 1943
