= Moleiro =

Moleiro literally meaning "miller" is an occupational surname of Portuguese or Galician language origin.

The surname may refer to:

- Alberto Moleiro (born 2003), Spanish footballer
- Manuel Moleiro
- Moisés Moleiro (1904–1979), Venezuelan pianist and composer

== See also ==
- José Morales Berriguete (1915–1999), Spanish footballer known as "Moleiro"
