= Luismi Cruz =

Spanish footballer (born 2001)

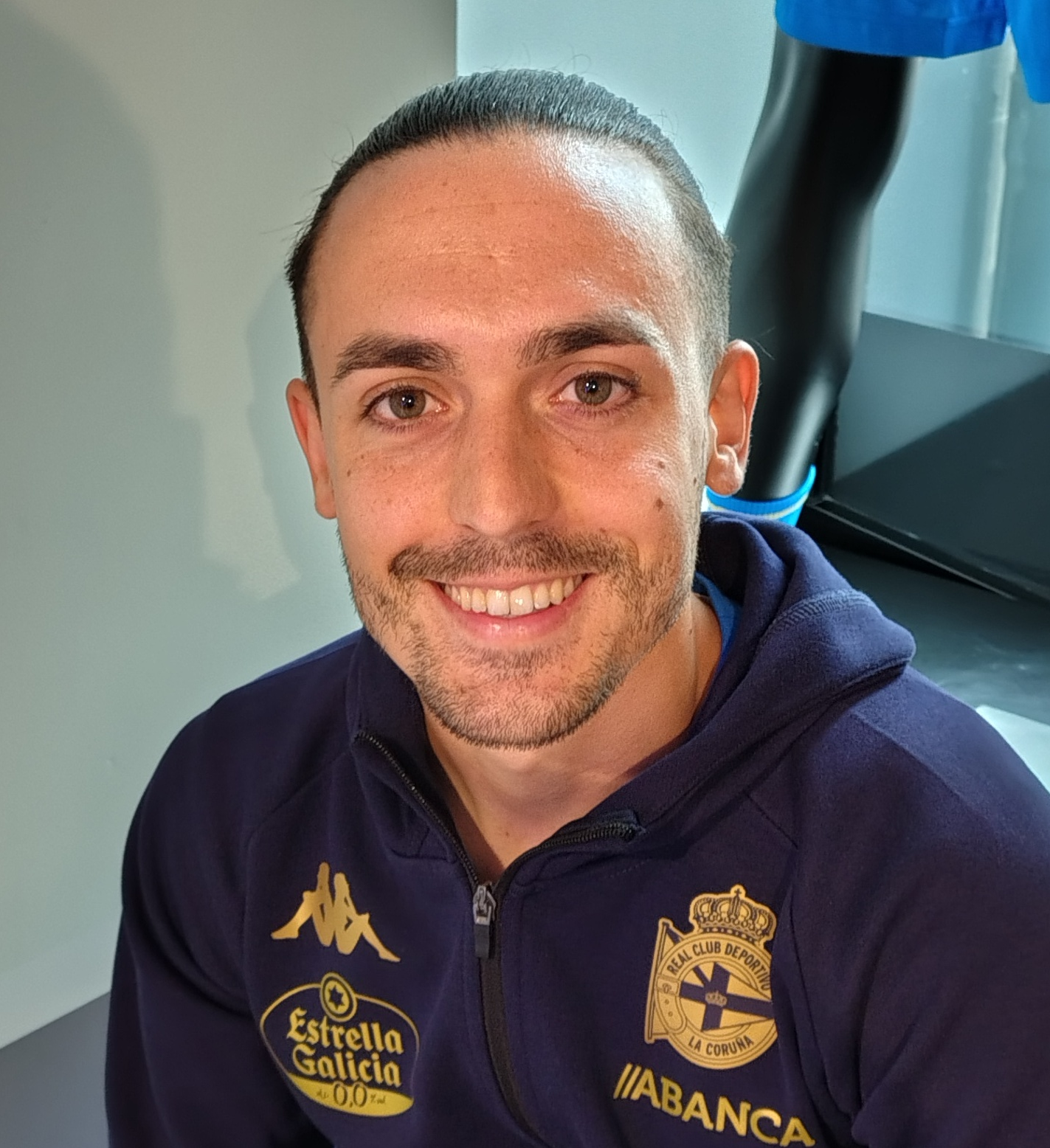
- Cruz in 2026

Personal information
- Full name: Luis Miguel Cruz Hernández
- Date of birth: 23 May 2001 (age 25)
- Place of birth: El Puerto de Santa María, Spain
- Height: 1.66 m (5 ft 5 in)
- Position: Winger

Team information
- Current team: Deportivo A Coruña
- Number: 19

Youth career
- Sevilla

Senior career*
| Years | Team | Apps | (Gls) |
| 2017–2020 | Sevilla C | 5 | (1) |
| 2018–2022 | Sevilla B | 55 | (8) |
| 2021–2024 | Sevilla | 2 | (0) |
| 2022–2023 | → Barcelona B (loan) | 35 | (6) |
| 2023–2024 | → Tenerife (loan) | 31 | (3) |
| 2024–2025 | Tenerife | 38 | (2) |
| 2025– | Deportivo A Coruña | 40 | (3) |

International career
| 2017 | Spain U16 | 2 | (0) |
- * Club domestic league appearances and goals as of 31 May 2026

Luis Miguel "Luismi" Cruz Hernández (born 23 May 2001) is a Spanish professional footballer who plays as a winger for Deportivo de A Coruña.

== Club career ==
Born in El Puerto de Santa María, Cádiz, Andalusia, Cruz was a Sevilla FC youth graduate. On 1 November 2017, while still in the Juvenil squads, he made his senior debut with the C-team by playing the last eight minutes of a 1–4 Tercera División away loss against UB Lebrijana.

Cruz first appeared with the reserves on 26 August 2018, coming on as a half-time substitute for Diego García in a 0–1 home loss against UD Ibiza in the Segunda División B. On 13 December 2018, he signed his first professional contract with the Nervionenses, agreeing to a deal until 2025.

In July 2019, Cruz suffered an anterior cruciate ligament injury, being sidelined until the following February. He scored his first senior goal on 15 February 2020, netting the C's only in a 1–0 home win over CD Utrera.

After being a regular starter for the B-side, Cruz made his first-team debut on 15 December 2021, replacing Joan Jordán in the second half of a 1–1 away draw against CE Andratx, in the season's Copa del Rey; he also converted Sevilla's fourth penalty in the 6–5 shoot-out win. His professional – and La Liga – debut occurred the following 22 January, as he again replaced Jordán in a 2–2 home draw against RC Celta de Vigo.

In August 2022, Cruz joined FC Barcelona Atlètic on a season-long loan deal with an option to buy. On 25 July of the following year, he moved to Segunda División side CD Tenerife also on loan, with a buyout clause.

On 24 June 2024, Cruz signed a permanent three-year contract with Tete. On 11 July of the following year, after suffering relegation, he moved to fellow second division side Deportivo de La Coruña on a four-year deal.

== International career ==
After representing Spain at under-16 level in 2017, Cruz was called up to the under-20s in July 2019, but had to withdraw due to injury.
