= Vicenç Martínez =

Spanish footballer (1925–2018)

Personal information
- Full name: Vicenç Martínez Alama
- Date of birth: 12 January 1925
- Place of birth: Barcelona, Spain
- Date of death: 2 October 2018 (aged 93)
- Place of death: Barcelona, Spain
- Position: Left back

Youth career
- Penya Acció Catòlica
- Racing de Sants
- Barcelona

Senior career*
Years	Team	Apps	(Gls)
1941–1945	Barcelona	7	(0)
1942–1944	→ Sabadell (loan)	21	(1)
1945–1949	Gimnàstic	38	(0)
1949–1950	Linense	26	(0)
1950–1951	Igualada	?	(?)
1951–1952	Sant Andreu	27	(1)
1952–1953	Gimnàstic	3	(0)
1953	Santboià		
- * Club domestic league appearances and goals

Vicenç Martínez Alama (12 January 1925 — 2 October 2018) was a Spanish footballer who played as a left back.

== Club career ==
Born in Barcelona, Catalonia, Martínez began his career playing youth football for local L'Hospitalet club Penya Acció Catòlica. Martínez later joined Racing de Sants, before signing for FC Barcelona. On 19 October 1941, at the age of 16 years, 10 months and 5 days, Martínez became Barcelona's youngest ever player, starting in a 4–3 loss against Real Madrid in El Clásico at Real Madrid's Estadio Chamartín. (Note: The record stood for 82 years until 28 October 2023, with Lamine Yamal breaking the record, aged 16 years and 107 days. Ansu Fati was the second youngest ever player only in 2019 at 16 years, 10 months and 23 days old.) Martínez made six further appearances for Barcelona in the 1941–42 La Liga season, before being loaned out to Sabadell in 1942 for two years. Upon his return to Barcelona, manager Josep Samitier rejected an offer from Valencia for Martínez, before a meniscus injury halted Martínez's progression at the club.

In 1945, Martínez signed for Gimnàstic, making 38 league appearances for the club over the course of four seasons. In 1949, Martínez left Catalonia to sign for Linense in southern Andalucía. Martínez stayed with the club for one season, playing 26 times. In 1950, Martínez returned to Catalonia, joining Igualada, before signing for Sant Andreu the following year. In 1952, Martínez re-signed for Gimnàstic, making three appearances, before retiring in 1953 at the age of 28 due to injury, after a spell at Santboià.

== Personal life ==
Due to the language policies of Francoist Spain, Martínez was also referred to as Vicente, as well as the Catalan name of Vicenç. On 2 October 2018, Martínez died, survived by his two sons Vicenç and Lluís.
