= José Bravo =

Spanish footballer (1916–1993)

Personal information
- Full name: José Bravo Domínguez
- Date of birth: 18 November 1916
- Place of birth: Ceuta, Spain
- Date of death: 1 February 1993 (aged 76)
- Place of death: Barcelona, Spain
- Position: Winger

Youth career
- 1929–1930: España de Ceuta

Senior career*
Years	Team	Apps	(Gls)
1930–1932	África Ceutí		
1932–1933	Levante		
1933–1935	Ceuta Sport		
1935–1936	Murcia		
1936	Zaragoza		
1939–1940	Murcia		
1940–1948	Barcelona	120	(51)
1948–1950	Gimnástico	41	(16)
1950–1951	Ceuta	15	(11)

International career
1942	Spain	1	(0)
- * Club domestic league appearances and goals

José Bravo Domínguez (18 November 1916 – 1 February 1993) was a Spanish footballer born in Ceuta, 18 November 1916.

== Career ==
He played as a left winger, the first team he played for was SD Unión África Ceutí. He then played for Levante, SD Ceuta again, Real Murcia, Real Zaragoza and then back to Murcia. In 1940 he joined FC Barcelona in which he played until the 1947–48 season, a total of 196 games, scoring 88 goals in all competitions. With the Blaugrana he won La Liga in 1945 and 1948, in addition to the Copa del Rey in 1942. When he left the club he moved to Gimnàstic de Tarragona and thereafter SD Ceuta, where he retired in 1951.

He played one match for the Spain national team against France in Seville on 15 March 1942. Spain won by four to zero. However this was the only time he would represent La furia roja.
