= Pedro María Arsuaga =

Spanish footballer

Personal information
- Full name: Pedro María Arsuaga Eguiazábal
- Date of birth: October 19, 1927
- Place of birth: Tolosa, Spain
- Date of death: October 22, 2009 (aged 82)
- Position: Forward

Senior career*
Years	Team	Apps	(Gls)
1946–1953	Real Madrid	65	(23)
1953–1954	Granada	13	(2)
1954–1958	Racing Santander	83	(17)
- * Club domestic league appearances and goals as of 12:05, 11 May 2024 (UTC)

Pedro María Arsuaga Eguiazábal (19 October 1927 – 22 October 2009) was a Spanish footballer who played as a forward. His role was on the left wing.

== Biography ==
He made his debut for Real Madrid in the 1946–1947 season, in the match Valencia CF 4 - Real Madrid 1. He remained with the Madrid team until the 1952–1953 season. He signed for Granada CF the following season in the second division. He returned to the First Division in 1954–1955 with Racing de Santander, but the club was relegated and played another 3 years, ending his career in the 1957–1958 season. He was the father of the paleoanthropologist Juan Luis Arsuaga (1954), known for his work in the Archaeological site of Atapuerca. (Burgos, Spain).
