= Manolo Muñoz (footballer) =

Spanish footballer (born 1962)

Personal information
- Full name: Manuel Muñoz Navas
- Date of birth: 5 September 1962
- Place of birth: Barcelona, Catalonia, Spain
- Height: 1.76 m (5 ft 9 in)
- Position: Forward

Youth career
- 1973: UE Sant Ildefons
- 1973–1976: Barcelona U14
- 1976–1978: Barcelona U16
- 1978–1981: Barcelona U19

Senior career*
Years	Team	Apps	(Gls)
1981–1983	Barcelona Amateur		
1983–1986	Barcelona Atlètic	26	
1986–1988	Granada		
1988–1989	Mallorca		
1989–1991	Figueres		
1991–1994	Santboià		

International career
1981	Spain U18	5	(1)
- * Club domestic league appearances and goals

Manuel Muñoz Navas, better known as Manolo (born 5 September 1962), was a Spanish footballer who played as a forward for Barcelona, Granada, and Mallorca in the 1980s. He was also a Spain youth international.

== Club career ==
Born on 5 September 1962 in Barcelona, Muñoz began playing football in his hometown club UE Sant Ildefons in 1973, aged 11, before joining the youth ranks of FC Barcelona that same year. During the next eight years, from 1973 until 1981, he played for the U14s (Aleví), U16s (Infantil), and U19 sides (Juvenil), before joining the Amateur Barça team in 1981, where he stayed for a further two years, until 1983, when he joined Barcelona Atlètic, with whom he played for three more years, until 1986. During this period, he was sometimes called up to the first team, where he was often used as a substitute, making his debut on 16 September 1980, in the first leg of the first round of the 1980–81 UEFA Cup, helping his side to a 0–2 win over Polish side Sliema Wanderers; this was also his last European match. In total, he played 17 official matches for Barça's first team. Notably, he started in both legs of the final of the 1986 Copa de la Liga against Real Betis, helping his side to a 2–1 win on aggregate.

In 1986, Muñoz signed for Granada, then in the Segunda División B, making an immediate impact on the team since it achieved promotion to the Segunda División within one year of his arrival, thanks to a third-place finish. However, they were relegated the following season, after which Muñoz went to Mallorca, also in the Second Division, where he once again achieved promotion within one year of his arrival. On 2 July 1989, in the second leg of the promotion playoffs against Espanyol, he came off the bench in the 73rd minute, with the aggregate score tied at 1; Muñoz then helped Mallorca find the winning goal in extra-time to seal the promotion to La Liga.

Muñoz then played two seasons at Figueres (1989–91), followed by three at Santboià (1991–94), where he retired in 1994, aged 32. In total, he scored 44 goals in 139 second division matches.

== International career ==
Muñoz was a member of the Spain U18 team that participated in the 1981 UEFA European Under-18 Championship, playing in all of the matches, and even scoring his side's third goal in a 3–0 win over Austria in the group stages. Spain then lost the semifinals and the third place match to Poland and France respectively, both times in a penalty shoot-out, with Muñoz converting his penalty against the former, but hitting the woodwork against France.

== Honours ==
Barcelona

- Copa de la Liga:
  - Champions (1): 1986
