= Nacho Martín (footballer, born 1962) =

Spanish footballer and manager

Personal information
- Full name: Ignacio Martín Solanas
- Date of birth: 10 July 1962 (age 64)
- Place of birth: Logroño, Spain
- Height: 1.82 m (6 ft 0 in)
- Position: Centre back

Youth career
- Berceo

Senior career*
| Years | Team | Apps | (Gls) |
| 1982–1983 | Logroñés | | |
| 1983–1985 | Barcelona B | 60 | (3) |
| 1985–1986 | Murcia | 7 | (0) |
| 1986–1994 | Logroñés | 238 | (3) |
| 1994–1995 | Elche | 9 | (0) |
| 1995 | Calahorra | | |
| Total | | 314 | (6) |

Managerial career
- 1996–1997: Logroñés (assistant)
- 1997–1998: Logroñés (youth)
- 1997–1998: Logroñés (interim)
- 1998–2000: Logroñés (assistant)
- 2001–2003: Calahorra
- 2005: Recreación
- 2005: Logroñés CF
- 2008–2009: Varea (youth)
- 2009–2010: Calahorra
- 2010–2011: UD Logroñés
- 2017–2018: Izarra
- 2020–2021: Tudelano
- * Club domestic league appearances and goals

Ignacio "Nacho" Martín Solanas (born 10 July 1962) is a Spanish retired footballer who played as a central defender, and a manager.

== Playing career ==
Born in Logroño, La Rioja, Martín finished his formation with CD Berceo, and made his senior debut with CD Logroñés in 1982. The following year he joined Segunda División side FC Barcelona Atlètic, and made his professional debut on 3 September of that year by starting in a 3–1 home win against Deportivo de La Coruña.

Martín scored his first goal on 20 January 1985, netting the first in a 2–1 home win against Castilla CF. The following July he moved to fellow league team Real Murcia, but appeared rarely.

In 1986 Martín returned to Logroñés, now in the second tier. He achieved promotion to La Liga as an undisputed starter, and made his debut in the category on 29 August 1987 by starting in a 0–2 away loss against Valencia CF.

Martín scored his first goal in the main category of Spanish football on 8 December 1991, netting the first in a 2–1 home success over RCD Espanyol. During his eight-season spell at the club, he also acted as team captain.

Martín subsequently represented Elche CF in Segunda División B and CD Calahorra in Tercera División, retiring with the latter in 1995 at the age of 33.

== Managerial career ==
Martín started his managerial career as Miguel Ángel Lotina's assistant at his main club Logroñés. He continued in the role during the campaign, behind Líber Arispe and Carlos Aimar, and also acted as an interim for two first division matches.

For the 1997–98 season, Martín was named manager of Logroñés' youth squad. After Víctor Muñoz's dismissal, he was named interim for four second level matches before the appointment of Marco Antonio Boronat; he subsequently acted as the latter's assistant.

In March 2005, Martín was appointed manager of third-tier club CD Recreación de La Rioja and remained in charge after the club's renaming to Logroñés CF. Dismissed in November of that year, he remained three years without a club until joining CD Varea's youth setup in December 2008.

On 23 June 2009, Martín was named Calahorra manager in the fourth division. On 3 November of the following year, he was appointed at the helm of UD Logroñés, but was sacked roughty a year later.

On 10 October 2017, after nearly six years out of work, Martín took over third level side CD Izarra, but was dismissed after only 12 matches. In January 2020, after more than a year without a club, when he appointed in charge of CD Tudelano.
