= Diego García (footballer, born 1997) =

Spanish footballer

Personal information
- Full name: Diego José García Moreno
- Date of birth: 29 July 1997 (age 29)
- Place of birth: Seville, Spain
- Height: 1.72 m (5 ft 8 in)
- Position: Midfielder

Team information
- Current team: Inter Sevilla

Youth career
- Betis

Senior career*
Years	Team	Apps	(Gls)
2015–2017	Betis B	13	(0)
2017–2018	Sevilla C	41	(7)
2018–2020	Sevilla B	55	(1)
2020–2021	Córdoba B	20	(2)
2021–2023	Utrera	63	(7)
2023	Real Jaén	14	(1)
2024–	Inter Sevilla	21	(2)
- * Club domestic league appearances and goals as of 13 October 2024

Diego José García Moreno (Note: In this Spanish name, the first or paternal surname is García and the second or maternal family name is Moreno.) (born 29 July 1997), known as Diego García, is a Spanish professional footballer who plays as a midfielder for Inter Sevilla.

== Club career ==
Born in Seville, Andalusia, García finished his formation with Real Betis. He made his senior debut with the reserves on 26 April 2015, starting in a 6–0 home routing over Lucena CF in the Segunda División B championship.

On 31 January 2017, after failing to make an appearance during the first half of the campaign, García terminated his contract with Betis, and signed for city rivals Sevilla FC's C-team the following day. On 14 May, he scored his first senior goal by netting his team's second in a 2–3 Tercera División away loss against CA Antoniano.

García made his professional debut with the reserves on 13 May 2018, starting in a 1–0 home win against Gimnàstic de Tarragona in the Segunda División championship.
