= 2026–27 ACF Fiorentina season =

Fiorentina
2026–27 season
- Owner: Mediacom
- President: Giuseppe B. Commisso
- Head coach: Fabio Grosso (until 6 September); Paolo Vanoli (from 7 September)
- Stadium: Stadio Artemio Franchi
- Serie A: 15th
- Coppa Italia: Round of 16
- Top goalscorer: League: Franco Mastantuono; Mateo Pellegrino (4 each); All: Mateo Pellegrino (5)
- Highest home attendance: 23,132 vs Frosinone; 29 August 2026, Serie A
- Lowest home attendance: 16,626 vs Benevento; 14 August 2026, Coppa Italia
- Average home league attendance: 22,053
- Biggest win: 4–1 vs Benevento (H); 14 August 2026, Coppa Italia; 3–0 vs Pisa (H); 15 September 2026, Coppa Italia
- Biggest defeat: 0–4 vs Roma (A); 24 August 2026, Serie A
Home colours	Away colours	Third colours
- All statistics correct as of 8 November 2026.

The 2026–27 season is the 100th season in the history of ACF Fiorentina, and the club's 23rd consecutive season in the Italian top flight. In addition to the domestic league, the club is participating in the Coppa Italia.

== Squad information ==
Players and squad numbers last updated on 2 November 2026. Appearances include all competitions. Note: Flags indicate national team as has been defined under FIFA eligibility rules. Players may hold more than one non-FIFA nationality.

No.	Player	Nat.	Position(s)	Date of birth (age)	Signed in	Contract ends	Signed from	Transfer fee	Apps.	Goals
Goalkeepers
19	Luca Lezzerini	(Italy)	GK	24 March 1995 (age 31)	2025	2028	(Italy) Brescia	Free	7	0
43	David de Gea	(Spain)	GK	7 November 1990 (age 36)	2024	2028	Unattached	Free	99	0
53	Oliver Christensen	(Denmark)	GK	22 March 1999 (age 27)	2023	2028	(Germany) Hertha BSC	€6M	14	0
Defenders
2	Dodô	(Brazil)	RB / RWB	17 November 1998 (age 28)	2022	2027	(Ukraine) Shakhtar Donetsk	€14.5M	165	3
3	Radu Drăgușin	(Romania)	CB / RB	3 February 2002 (age 24)	2026	2027	(England) Tottenham Hotspur	Loan (€1.5M)	11	0
5	Marin Pongračić	(Croatia)	CB	11 September 1997 (age 29)	2024	2029	(Italy) Lecce	€15M	82	1
6	Luca Ranieri	(Italy)	CB / LB	23 April 1999 (age 27)	2018	2028	(Italy) Youth Sector	N/A	164	11
17	João Mário	(Portugal)	RB / RWB / LB	3 January 2000 (age 26)	2026	2027	(Italy) Juventus	Loan (€1.8M)	7	1
20	Álex Jiménez	(Spain)	RB / RWB / LB	8 May 2005 (age 21)	2026	2027	(England) Bournemouth	Loan	10	2
21	Víctor Valdepeñas	(Spain)	CB / LB	20 October 2006 (age 20)	2026		(Spain) Real Madrid	€8M	9	1
33	Viery	(Brazil)	CB / LB	2 January 2005 (age 21)	2026	2031	(Brazil) Grêmio	€15M	10	0
65	Fabiano Parisi	(Italy)	LB / LWB / LM	9 November 2000 (age 26)	2023	2029	(Italy) Empoli	€10M	105	3
Midfielders
4	Marco Brescianini	(Italy)	CM / DM / AM	20 January 2000 (age 26)	2026	2030	(Italy) Atalanta	€10M	27	1
14	Arthur Atta	(France)	CM / AM	14 January 2003 (age 23)	2026	2031	(Italy) Udinese	€25M	5	0
27	Cher Ndour	(Italy)	CM	27 July 2004 (age 22)	2025	2029	(France) Paris Saint-Germain	€5M	67	7
42	Christ Inao Oulaï	(Ivory Coast)	CM / DM / AM	6 April 2006 (age 20)	2026		(Turkey) Trabzonspor	€26M	7	0
44	Nicolò Fagioli	(Italy)	CM / AM	12 February 2001 (age 25)	2025	2028	(Italy) Juventus	€13.5M	76	5
Forwards
23	Beto	(Guinea-Bissau)	CF	31 January 1998 (age 28)	2026	2030	(England) Everton	€18M	10	0
25	Alieu Njie	(Sweden)	LW / CF	14 May 2005 (age 21)	2026	2027	(Italy) Torino	€4M	10	2
28	Pedro Gonçalves	(Portugal)	LW	28 June 1998 (age 28)	2026	2027	(Portugal) Sporting CP	€2.5M	9	1
29	Wilfried Gnonto	(Italy)	RW / SS / LW	5 November 2003 (age 23)	2026	2027	(England) Leeds United	€1M	10	1
30	Franco Mastantuono	(Argentina)	RW / AM	14 August 2007 (age 19)	2026	2027	(Spain) Real Madrid	Loan (€3.5M)	11	4
32	Mateo Pellegrino	(Argentina)	CF	22 October 2001 (age 25)	2026	2031	(Italy) Parma	€25M	11	4
—	Riccardo Sottil	(Italy)	LW / RW	3 June 1999 (age 27)	2018	2027	(Italy) Torino	€0.5M	138	15

== Transfers ==
=== Summer window ===
==== In ====
Date	Pos.	Player	From	Fee	Notes	Ref.
1 July 2026	DF	(Brazil) Viery	(Brazil) Grêmio	€15,000,000	+ €2,000,000 in add-ons	
1 July 2026	MF	(Italy) Marco Brescianini	(Italy) Atalanta	€10,000,000	From loan to definitive purchase	
1 July 2026	MF	(Italy) Giovanni Fabbian	(Italy) Bologna	€13,000,000	From loan to definitive purchase	
11 July 2026	MF	(France) Arthur Atta	(Italy) Udinese	€25,000,000	+ €5,000,000 in add-ons	
19 July 2026	MF	(Ivory Coast) Christ Inao Oulaï	(Turkey) Trabzonspor	€26,000,000	+ €4,000,000 in add-ons	
31 July 2026	DF	(Spain) Víctor Valdepeñas	(Spain) Real Madrid	€8,000,000		
13 August 2026	FW	(Argentina) Mateo Pellegrino	(Italy) Parma	€25,000,000	+ €5,000,000 in add-ons	
1 September 2026	FW	(Guinea-Bissau) Beto	(England) Everton	€18,000,000		

==== Loans in ====
Date	Pos.	Player	From	Fee	Notes	Ref.
8 July 2026	DF	(Romania) Radu Drăgușin	(England) Tottenham Hotspur	€1,500,000	Obligation to buy for €17,500,000 under certain conditions	
16 July 2026	DF	(Spain) Álex Jiménez	(England) Bournemouth	Free	Option to buy for €20,000,000	
3 August 2026	DF	(Portugal) João Mário	(Italy) Juventus	€1,800,000	Option to buy for €9,500,000	
7 August 2026	FW	(Argentina) Franco Mastantuono	(Spain) Real Madrid	€3,500,000		
30 August 2026	FW	(Sweden) Alieu Njie	(Italy) Torino	Free	Obligation to buy for €16,000,000 plus €4,000,000 in add-ons under certain conditions	
1 September 2026	FW	(Portugal) Pedro Gonçalves	(Portugal) Sporting CP	€2,500,000	Option to buy for €22,500,000	
1 September 2026	FW	(Italy) Wilfried Gnonto	(England) Leeds United	€1,000,000	Option to buy for €15,000,000	

==== Loan returns ====
Date	Pos.	Player	From	Fee	Notes	Ref.
30 June 2026	GK	(Italy) Tommaso Martinelli	(Italy) Sampdoria	Free		
30 June 2026	GK	(Italy) Laerte Tognetti	(Italy) Follonica Gavorrano	Free		
30 June 2026	GK	(Italy) Tommaso Vannucchi	(Italy) Cosenza	Free		
30 June 2026	DF	(Italy) Leonardo Baroncelli	(Italy) Gubbio	Free		
30 June 2026	DF	(Italy) Mirko Elia	(Italy) Forlì	Free		
30 June 2026	DF	(Argentina) Matías Moreno	(Spain) Levante	Free	Option to buy not exercised	
30 June 2026	DF	(Italy) Lorenzo Romani	(Italy) Lecco	Free		
30 June 2026	DF	(Italy) Giulio Scuderi	(Italy) Alcione Milano	Free		
30 June 2026	DF	(Argentina) Nicolás Valentini	(Italy) Hellas Verona	Free	Option to buy not exercised	
30 June 2026	MF	(Italy) Lorenzo Amatucci	(Spain) Las Palmas	Free	Option to buy not exercised	
30 June 2026	MF	(Czech Republic) Antonín Barák	(Italy) Sampdoria	Free	Option to buy not exercised	
30 June 2026	MF	(Italy) Alessandro Bianco	(Greece) PAOK	Free	Option to buy not exercised	
30 June 2026	MF	(Italy) Jonas Harder	(Italy) Padova			
30 June 2026	MF	(Morocco) Amir Richardson	(Denmark) Copenhagen	Free	Option to buy not exercised	
30 June 2026	MF	(Switzerland) Simon Sohm	(Italy) Bologna	Free	Option to buy not exercised	
30 June 2026	MF	(Italy) Riccardo Spaggiari	(Italy) Arzignano Valchiampo	Free		
30 June 2026	FW	(Argentina) Lucas Beltrán	(Spain) Valencia	Free	Option to buy not exercised	
30 June 2026	FW	(Italy) Maat Daniel Caprini	(Italy) Mantova	Free		
30 June 2026	FW	(Italy) Filippo Distefano	(Italy) Carrarese	Free		
30 June 2026	FW	(Angola) M'Bala Nzola	(Italy) Sassuolo	Free	Option to buy not exercised	
30 June 2026	FW	(Italy) Jacopo Tarantino	(Italy) Audace Cerignola	Free		

==== Out ====
Date	Pos.	Player	To	Fee	Notes	Ref.
11 May 2026	DF	(Ghana) Tariq Lamptey	(England) Queens Park Rangers	Free		
1 July 2026	GK	(Italy) Laerte Tognetti	Unattached	Free	End of contract	
1 July 2026	MF	(Morocco) Abdelhamid Sabiri	(Turkey) Eyüpspor	Free	End of contract	
4 July 2026	DF	(Italy) Leonardo Baroncelli	(Italy) Gubbio	Undisclosed		
9 July 2026	MF	(Italy) Lorenzo Amatucci	(Spain) Deportivo A Coruña	€2,500,000		
14 July 2026	MF	(Italy) Jonas Harder	(Switzerland) Basel	€2,000,000		
21 July 2026	MF	(Italy) Alessandro Bianco	(Italy) Modena	€1,000,000		
21 July 2026	FW	(Italy) Filippo Distefano	(Italy) Empoli	€250,000		
29 July 2026	DF	(Venezuela) Luis Balbo	(Austria) Sturm Graz	€1,500,000		
1 August 2026	GK	(Italy) Tommaso Mazzi	(Italy) Cesena	Undisclosed		
6 August 2026	DF	(Argentina) Nicolás Valentini	(Spain) Alavés	€3,000,000		
7 August 2026	MF	(Italy) Gabriele Conti	(Italy) Perugia	Undisclosed		
14 August 2026	FW	(Italy) Riccardo Braschi	(Switzerland) Thun	€1,200,000		
1 September 2026	MF	(Italy) Rolando Mandragora	(Italy) Torino	€5,000,000		
1 September 2026	FW	(Angola) M'Bala Nzola	(Italy) Cagliari	Free		
4 September 2026	MF	(Czech Republic) Antonín Barák	(Cyprus) APOEL	Undisclosed		

==== Loans out ====
Date	Pos.	Player	To	Fee	Notes	Ref.
2 July 2026	FW	(Argentina) Lucas Beltrán	(Argentina) River Plate	€500,000	Obligation to buy for €6,700,000	
4 July 2026	FW	(Italy) Carlo Evangelista	(Italy) Pergolettese	Free		
8 July 2026	DF	(Italy) Eddy Kouadio	(Italy) Monza	Free	Obligation to buy for €1,500,000 under certain conditions + €400,000 add-ons	
10 July 2026	GK	(Italy) Tommaso Martinelli	(Italy) Avellino	Free		
10 July 2026	DF	(Italy) Lorenzo Romani	(Italy) Carrarese	Free		
13 July 2026	MF	(Italy) Jacopo Fazzini	(Italy) Cagliari	€800,000	Option to buy for €8,000,000	
14 July 2026	FW	(Italy) Maat Daniel Caprini	(Italy) Cesena	Free	Option to buy for an undisclosed fee, buy-back option for an undisclosed fee	
17 July 2026	DF	(Germany) Robin Gosens	(Germany) Schalke 04	Free	Option to buy for €2,500,000	
19 July 2026	DF	(Italy) Mirko Elia	(Italy) Bari	Free		
19 July 2026	MF	(Morocco) Amir Richardson	(France) Le Havre	Free	Option to buy for €8,000,000	
24 July 2026	DF	(Italy) Giulio Scuderi	(Italy) Juve Stabia	Free	Option to buy for an undisclosed fee, buy-back option for an undisclosed fee	
27 July 2026	GK	(Italy) Tommaso Vannucchi	(Italy) Arzignano Valchiampo	Free		
29 July 2026	DF	(Italy) Pietro Comuzzo	(Italy) Torino	€1,000,000	Option to buy for €19,000,000	
30 July 2026	DF	(Argentina) Matías Moreno	(Italy) Venezia	€500,000	Obligation to buy for €5,500,000 under certain conditions	
1 August 2026	DF	(Italy) Niccolò Trapani	(Italy) Alcione Milano	Free		
1 August 2026	FW	(Italy) Giorgio Puzzoli	(Italy) Alcione Milano	Free		
1 August 2026	MF	(Italy) Luca Montenegro	(Italy) Dolomoti	Free		
2 August 2026	MF	(Switzerland) Simon Sohm	(Italy) Venezia	Free	Option to buy for €10,000,000	
6 August 2026	MF	(Italy) Lapo Deli	(Italy) Empoli	Free	Option to buy for an undisclosed fee, buy-back option for an undisclosed fee	
12 August 2026	FW	(Italy) Gabriele Bertolini	(Italy) Atalanta Under-23	Free		
13 August 2026	FW	(Italy) Roberto Piccoli	(Italy) Bologna	Free	Obligation to buy for an undisclosed fee	
28 August 2026	MF	(Italy) Giovanni Fabbian	(Italy) Parma	€1,000,000	Option to buy for €14,000,000	
1 September 2026	FW	(Italy) Moise Kean	(Italy) Como	€5,000,000	Obligation to buy for €35,000,000	
1 September 2026	FW	(Iceland) Albert Guðmundsson	(Italy) Lazio	Free	Obligation to buy for an undisclosed fee	

==== Loans ended ====
Date	Pos.	Player	To	Fee	Notes	Ref.
30 June 2026	DF	(Italy) Daniele Rugani	(Italy) Juventus	Free	Purchase conditions not met	
30 June 2026	FW	(England) Jack Harrison	(England) Leeds United	Free	Option to buy not exercised	
30 June 2026	FW	(Israel) Manor Solomon	(England) Tottenham Hotspur	Free	Option to buy not exercised	

=== Winter window ===
==== In ====
Date	Pos.	Player	From	Fee	Notes	Ref.

==== Loans in ====
Date	Pos.	Player	From	Fee	Notes	Ref.

==== Loan returns ====
Date	Pos.	Player	From	Fee	Notes	Ref.

==== Out ====
Date	Pos.	Player	To	Fee	Notes	Ref.

==== Loans out ====
Date	Pos.	Player	To	Fee	Notes	Ref.

==== Loans ended ====
Date	Pos.	Player	To	Fee	Notes	Ref.

== Competitions ==
=== Overall record ===
Competition	First match	Last match	Starting round	Final position	Record							
Competition	First match	Last match	Starting round	Final position	Pld	W	D	L	GF	GA	GD	Win %
Serie A	24 August 2026	30 May 2027	Matchday 1	TBD	11	2	3	6	17	25	−8	18.18
Coppa Italia	14 August 2026	TBD	First round	TBD	2	2	0	0	7	1	+6	100.00
Total					13	4	3	6	24	26	−2	30.77

Last updated: 8 November 2026
Source: Soccerway

=== Serie A ===
==== League table ====
Pos	Team	Pld	W	D	L	GF	GA	GD	Pts	Qualification or relegation
14	Lecce	11	3	1	7	12	22	−10	10	
15	Venezia	12	3	0	9	18	21	−3	9	
16	Fiorentina	11	2	3	6	17	25	−8	9	
17	Parma	11	2	2	7	9	17	−8	8	
18	Sassuolo	11	2	2	7	16	29	−13	8	Relegation to Serie B

Updated to match(es) played on 8 November 2026. Source: Serie A
Rules for classification: 1) Points; 2) Head-to-head points; 3) Head-to-head goal difference; 4) Goal difference; 5) Goals scored; 6) Drawing of lots.
End-of-season ties on points for 1st or 17th are instead decided by a one- or two-leg play-off, respectively, unless the play-off would involve a UEFA competition finalist (in which case rules 2–6 apply). Rules 2–6 determine home advantage (for 17th, the better-ranked team hosts the second leg); if three or more teams are tied, they also select the two play-off teams.

==== Results summary ====
Overall								Home						Away					
Pld	W	D	L	GF	GA	GD	Pts	W	D	L	GF	GA	GD	W	D	L	GF	GA	GD
11	2	3	6	17	25	−8	9	0	3	3	7	13	−6	2	0	3	10	12	−2

Last updated: 8 November 2026.
Source: Serie A

==== Results by round ====
Round	1	2	3	4	5	6	7	8	9	10	11	12	13	14	15	16	17	18	19	20	21	22	23	24	25	26	27	28	29	30	31	32	33	34	35	36	37	38
Ground	A	H	H	A	H	A	H	A	H	A	H	A	A	H	A	H	H	A	H	A	H	A	H	A	H	A	H	A	H	A	H	H	A	A	H	A	H	A
Result	L	L	L	W	D	L	L	L	D	W	D																											
Position	20	20	20	15	17	19	19	18	18	16	15																											

Updated to match(es) played on 8 November 2026. Source: Serie A
A = Away; H = Home; W = Win; D = Draw; L = Loss; P = Postponed

==== Matches ====
The match schedule was released on 5 June 2026.

24 August 2026 1	Roma	4–0	Fiorentina	Rome
20:45 CEST (UTC+2)	Malen 27', 52', 60'; Hermoso (yellow card) 39'; Koné (yellow card) 49'; Pisilli 86'	Report	Fagioli (yellow card) 30'; Pellegrino (yellow card) 63'	Stadium: Stadio Olimpico; Attendance: 67,598; Referee: Matteo Marcenaro

29 August 2026 2	Fiorentina	0–3	Frosinone	Florence
18:30 CEST (UTC+2)	Jiménez (yellow card) 24'; Guðmundsson (yellow card) 49'; Drăgușin (yellow card) 90'	Report	Raimondo (yellow card) 8', (goal) 26', 68'; Bracaglia (yellow card) 24', (goal) 38'; Calvani (yellow card) 45+2'	Stadium: Stadio Artemio Franchi; Attendance: 23,132; Referee: Giuseppe Collu

5 September 2026 3	Fiorentina	1–2	Torino	Florence
15:00 CEST (UTC+2)	Pellegrino 47'	Report	Mandragora 74'; Adams 82'	Stadium: Stadio Artemio Franchi; Attendance: 21,785; Referee: Davide Massa

11 September 2026 4	Venezia	2–4	Fiorentina	Venice
20:45 CEST (UTC+2)	Adams 22'; Schingtienne (yellow card) 38'; Sohm (yellow card) 73'; Hainaut 86'	Report	Mastantuono 29', 30', 84'; Pellegrino 66'; Njie (yellow card) 72'	Stadium: Stadio Pier Luigi Penzo; Attendance: 11,723; Referee: Francesco Fourneau

20 September 2026 5	Fiorentina	1–1	Napoli	Florence
12:30 CEST (UTC+2)	Mastantuono (yellow card) 42'; Jiménez 51'; Ranieri (yellow card) 62'; De Gea (yellow card) 83'	Report	Gilmour 23'	Stadium: Stadio Artemio Franchi; Attendance: 22,567; Referee: Daniele Doveri

10 October 2026 6	Genoa	2–1	Fiorentina	Genoa
15:00 CEST (UTC+2)	Osmajić 7'; Messias 15'; Traorè (yellow card) 73'; Vásquez (yellow card) 84'; Wiafe (yellow card) 85'; Vitinha (yellow card) 90+1'; Sabelli (yellow card) 90+5'	Report	Ranieri (yellow card) 15'; Inao Oulaï (yellow card) 21'; Viery (yellow card) 60'; Vásquez 73' (o.g.)	Stadium: Stadio Luigi Ferraris; Attendance: 31,630; Referee: Fabio Maresca

18 October 2026 7	Fiorentina	1–3	Como	Florence
15:00 CEST (UTC+2)	Pongračić 42'; Ndour (yellow card) 68'; Mastantuono (yellow card) 74'	Report	Valle (yellow card) 28'; Liberali 32'; Paz 36', (yellow card) 39'; Ramón (yellow card) 45+3'; Douvikas 57'	Stadium: Stadio Artemio Franchi; Attendance: 21,873; Referee: Marco Di Bello

25 October 2026 8	Internazionale	2–1	Fiorentina	Milan
12:30 CEST (UTC+2)	Thuram 90+1'; Zieliński 90+7' (pen.)	Report	Jiménez 65'; Viery (yellow card) 70'	Stadium: San Siro; Attendance: 74,642; Referee: Maurizio Mariani

29 October 2026 9	Fiorentina	2–2	Atalanta	Florence
20:45 CET (UTC+1)	Viery (yellow card) 30'; Pellegrino (yellow card) 51'; Njie 53'; João Mário 61'; Gnonto (yellow card) 75'	Report	Elmas (yellow card) 12'; De Ketelaere 41'; Zalewski 74'; Obrić (yellow card) 83'	Stadium: Stadio Artemio Franchi; Attendance: 20,351; Referee: Federico La Penna

2 November 2026 10	Sassuolo	2–4	Fiorentina	Reggio Emilia
18:30 CET (UTC+1)	Laurienté 25', 65'; Sulemana (yellow card) 40'; Kulla (yellow card) 90+5'	Report	Drăgușin (yellow card) 42'; Njie (yellow card) 44', (goal) 50'; Pellegrino 45+2'; Mastantuono 79'; Gnonto (yellow card) 90+2'; Valdepeñas 90+3'	Stadium: Mapei Stadium – Città del Tricolore; Attendance: 12,297; Referee: Matteo Marcenaro

8 November 2026 11	Fiorentina	2–2	Juventus	Florence
20:45 CET (UTC+1)	Pellegrino 4'; Inao Oulaï (yellow card) 50'; Njie 54'	Report	Cabal (yellow card) 13'; Bremer (yellow card) 22', (goal) 66'; Woltemade 32'; Kolo Muani (yellow card) 74'	Stadium: Stadio Artemio Franchi; Attendance: 22,609; Referee: Andrea Colombo

23 November 2026 12	Monza	v	Fiorentina	Monza
18:30 CET (UTC+1)		Report		Stadium: Stadio Brianteo

29 November 2026 13	Udinese	v	Fiorentina	Udine
12:30 CET (UTC+1)		Report		Stadium: Stadio Friuli

7 December 2026 14	Fiorentina	v	Cagliari	Florence
20:45 CET (UTC+1)		Report		Stadium: Stadio Artemio Franchi

13 December 2026 15	Parma	v	Fiorentina	Parma
18:00 CET (UTC+1)		Report		Stadium: Stadio Ennio Tardini

20 December 2026 16	Fiorentina	v	Bologna	Florence
12:30 CET (UTC+1)		Report		Stadium: Stadio Artemio Franchi

2 January 2027 17	Fiorentina	v	Lazio	Florence
15:00 CET (UTC+1)		Report		Stadium: Stadio Artemio Franchi

5 January 2027 18	Milan	v	Fiorentina	Milan
20:45 CET (UTC+1)		Report		Stadium: San Siro

10 January 2027 19	Fiorentina	v	Lecce	Florence
15:00 CET (UTC+1)		Report		Stadium: Stadio Artemio Franchi

16 January 2027 20	Napoli	v	Fiorentina	Naples
--:-- CET (UTC+1)		Report		Stadium: Stadio Diego Armando Maradona

23 January 2027 21	Fiorentina	v	Sassuolo	Florence
--:-- CET (UTC+1)		Report		Stadium: Stadio Artemio Franchi

30 January 2027 22	Atalanta	v	Fiorentina	Bergamo
--:-- CET (UTC+1)		Report		Stadium: Gewiss Stadium

6 February 2027 23	Fiorentina	v	Udinese	Florence
--:-- CET (UTC+1)		Report		Stadium: Stadio Artemio Franchi

13 February 2027 24	Frosinone	v	Fiorentina	Frosinone
--:-- CET (UTC+1)		Report		Stadium: Stadio Benito Stirpe

20 February 2027 25	Fiorentina	v	Internazionale	Florence
--:-- CET (UTC+1)		Report		Stadium: Stadio Artemio Franchi

27 February 2027 26	Torino	v	Fiorentina	Turin
--:-- CET (UTC+1)		Report		Stadium: Stadio Olimpico Grande Torino

6 March 2027 27	Fiorentina	v	Venezia	Florence
--:-- CET (UTC+1)		Report		Stadium: Stadio Artemio Franchi

13 March 2027 28	Cagliari	v	Fiorentina	Cagliari
--:-- CET (UTC+1)		Report		Stadium: Unipol Domus

20 March 2027 29	Fiorentina	v	Genoa	Florence
--:-- CET (UTC+1)		Report		Stadium: Stadio Artemio Franchi

3 April 2027 30	Como	v	Fiorentina	Como
--:-- CEST (UTC+2)		Report		Stadium: Stadio Giuseppe Sinigaglia

10 April 2027 31	Fiorentina	v	Milan	Florence
--:-- CEST (UTC+2)		Report		Stadium: Stadio Artemio Franchi

17 April 2027 32	Fiorentina	v	Parma	Florence
--:-- CEST (UTC+2)		Report		Stadium: Stadio Artemio Franchi

24 April 2027 33	Juventus	v	Fiorentina	Turin
--:-- CEST (UTC+2)		Report		Stadium: Juventus Stadium

1 May 2027 34	Bologna	v	Fiorentina	Bologna
--:-- CEST (UTC+2)		Report		Stadium: Stadio Renato Dall'Ara

8 May 2027 35	Fiorentina	v	Roma	Florence
--:-- CEST (UTC+2)		Report		Stadium: Stadio Artemio Franchi

15 May 2027 36	Lecce	v	Fiorentina	Lecce
--:-- CEST (UTC+2)		Report		Stadium: Stadio Via del mare

22 May 2027 37	Fiorentina	v	Monza	Florence
--:-- CEST (UTC+2)		Report		Stadium: Stadio Artemio Franchi

29 May 2027 38	Lazio	v	Fiorentina	Rome
--:-- CEST (UTC+2)		Report		Stadium: Stadio Olimpico

=== Coppa Italia ===
14 August 2026 First round	Fiorentina	4–1	Benevento	Florence
21:15 CEST (UTC+2)	Guðmundsson 2'; Kean 35'; Ranieri 48'; Ndour 50'; Inao Oulaï (yellow card) 70'	Report	Lamesta 54'; Beruatto (yellow card) 90+2'	Stadium: Stadio Artemio Franchi; Attendance: 16,626; Referee: Gianluca Manganiello

15 September 2026 Second round	Fiorentina	3–0	Pisa	Florence
21:00 CEST (UTC+2)	Mastantuono (yellow card) 6'; Pellegrino 40'; Valdepeñas (yellow card) 55'; Gnonto 71'; Gonçalves 90+2'	Report	Loyola (yellow card) 35'; Canestrelli (yellow card) 52'	Stadium: Stadio Artemio Franchi; Attendance: 17,474; Referee: Livio Marinelli

16 December 2026 Round of 16	Napoli	v	Fiorentina	Naples
21:00 CET (UTC+1)		Report		Stadium: Stadio Diego Armando Maradona

== Squad statistics ==
No.	Pos	Nat	Player	Total		Serie A		Coppa Italia	
No.	Pos	Nat	Player	Apps	Goals	Apps	Goals	Apps	Goals
Goalkeepers
19	GK	(Italy) ITA	Luca Lezzerini	0	0	0	0	0	0
43	GK	(Spain) ESP	David de Gea	12	0	10	0	2	0
53	GK	(Denmark) DEN	Oliver Christensen	0	0	0	0	0	0
Defenders
2	DF	(Brazil) BRA	Dodô	5	0	1+3	0	0+1	0
3	DF	(Romania) ROU	Radu Drăgușin	12	0	10	0	2	0
5	DF	(Croatia) CRO	Marin Pongračić	7	1	3+2	1	1+1	0
6	DF	(Italy) ITA	Luca Ranieri	5	1	4	0	1	1
17	DF	(Portugal) POR	João Mário	8	1	4+2	1	2	0
20	DF	(Spain) ESP	Álex Jiménez	10	2	8+1	2	0+1	0
21	DF	(Spain) ESP	Víctor Valdepeñas	10	1	4+4	1	2	0
33	DF	(Brazil) BRA	Viery	10	0	6+3	0	0+1	0
65	DF	(Italy) ITA	Fabiano Parisi	0	0	0	0	0	0
Midfielders
4	MF	(Italy) ITA	Marco Brescianini	10	0	5+3	0	2	0
14	MF	(France) FRA	Arthur Atta	6	0	4+1	0	1	0
27	MF	(Italy) ITA	Cher Ndour	12	1	9+1	0	2	1
42	MF	(Ivory Coast) CIV	Christ Inao Oulaï	8	0	3+3	0	1+1	0
44	MF	(Italy) ITA	Nicolò Fagioli	11	0	9+1	0	1	0
Forwards
23	FW	(Guinea-Bissau) GBS	Beto	9	0	2+6	0	0+1	0
25	FW	(Sweden) SWE	Alieu Njie	9	2	7+1	2	0+1	0
28	FW	(Portugal) POR	Pedro Gonçalves	8	1	1+6	0	0+1	1
29	FW	(Italy) ITA	Wilfried Gnonto	9	1	1+7	0	1	1
30	FW	(Argentina) ARG	Franco Mastantuono	12	4	10	4	1+1	0
32	FW	(Argentina) ARG	Mateo Pellegrino	11	4	8+2	3	1	1
70	FW	(Italy) ITA	Federico Croci	1	0	0	0	0+1	0
Players transferred/loaned out during the season
8	MF	(Italy) ITA	Rolando Mandragora	2	0	0+2	0	0	0
9	FW	(Italy) ITA	Moise Kean	2	1	0+1	0	1	1
11	FW	(Iceland) ISL	Albert Guðmundsson	2	1	1	0	1	1

Last updated: 2 November 2026
Source: Competitions
