= Manuel Ángel =

Spanish footballer (born 2004)

- Ángel with Fulham in 2026

Personal information
- Full name: Manuel Ángel Morán Ibáñez
- Date of birth: 15 March 2004 (age 22)
- Place of birth: Albaida del Aljarafe, Spain
- Height: 1.70 m (5 ft 7 in)
- Position: Midfielder

Team information
- Current team: Fulham
- Number: 20

Youth career
- 2012–2018: Sevilla
- 2018–2021: Real Madrid

Senior career*
Years	Team	Apps	(Gls)
2021–2026	Real Madrid B	65	(3)
2026	Real Madrid	4	(0)
2026–	Fulham	1	(0)

International career
2019–2020	Spain U16	7	(1)
2021–2022	Spain U18	10	(0)
2022–2023	Spain U19	13	(2)
2022	Spain U20	2	(0)
- * Club domestic league appearances and goals as of 17:03, 10 October 2026 (UTC)

Manuel Ángel Morán Ibáñez (born 15 March 2004), known as Manuel Ángel, is a Spanish footballer who plays as a midfielder for Premier League club Fulham.

== Early life ==
Manuel Ángel is nicknamed "Mami" which is the acronym of his full name.

== Club career ==
=== Youth career ===
As a youth player, Manuel Ángel joined the youth academy of Spanish La Liga side Real Madrid, where he was regarded as one of the club's most important central midfielders.

=== Real Madrid ===
Manuel Ángel made his debut for the senior team on 16 January 2026 in a Copa del Rey defeat against Albacete. He came on as a substitute, replacing Jorge Cestero in the 86th minute. On 11 March, he made his UEFA Champions League debut as substitute in a 3–0 win over Manchester City. On 14 March, he played his second game in La Liga, scoring an own goal in a 4–1 win against Elche.

=== Fulham ===
On 1 September 2026, Manuel Ángel signed a three-year contract with Premier League club Fulham. The move reunited him with his former coach at Real Madrid, Álvaro Arbeloa.

== International career ==
Manuel Ángel represented Spain internationally at the 2023 UEFA European Under-19 Championship.

== Style of play ==
Manuel Ángel mainly operates as a midfielder and has been described as "fundamental in getting the ball out, it is worth highlighting his good decision-making and associative capacity. He handles both legs, creates, distributes and empties in defense".

== Personal life ==
Manuel Ángel is a native of Albaida del Aljarafe, Spain.

== Career statistics ==
As of match played 10 October 2026

Appearances and goals by club, season and competition
Club	Season	League			National cup (Note: Includes Copa del Rey)		League cup		Europe		Other		Total	
Club	Season	Division	Apps	Goals	Apps	Goals	Apps	Goals	Apps	Goals	Apps	Goals	Apps	Goals
Real Madrid Castilla	2022–23	Primera Federación	1	0	—		—		—		—		1	0
Real Madrid Castilla	2023–24	Primera Federación	32	2	—		—		—		—		32	2
Real Madrid Castilla	2024–25	Primera Federación	17	0	—		—		—		—		17	0
Real Madrid Castilla	2025–26	Primera Federación	15	1	—		—		—		—		15	1
Real Madrid Castilla	Total		65	3	—		—		—		—		65	3
Real Madrid	2025–26	La Liga	4	0	1	0	—		2 (Note: Appearances in UEFA Champions League)	0	0	0	7	0
Fulham	2026–27	Premier League	1	0	0	0	1	0	—		—		1	0
Career total			70	3	1	0	1	0	2	0	0	0	74	3
