= Christ Inao Oulaï =

Ivorian footballer (born 2006)

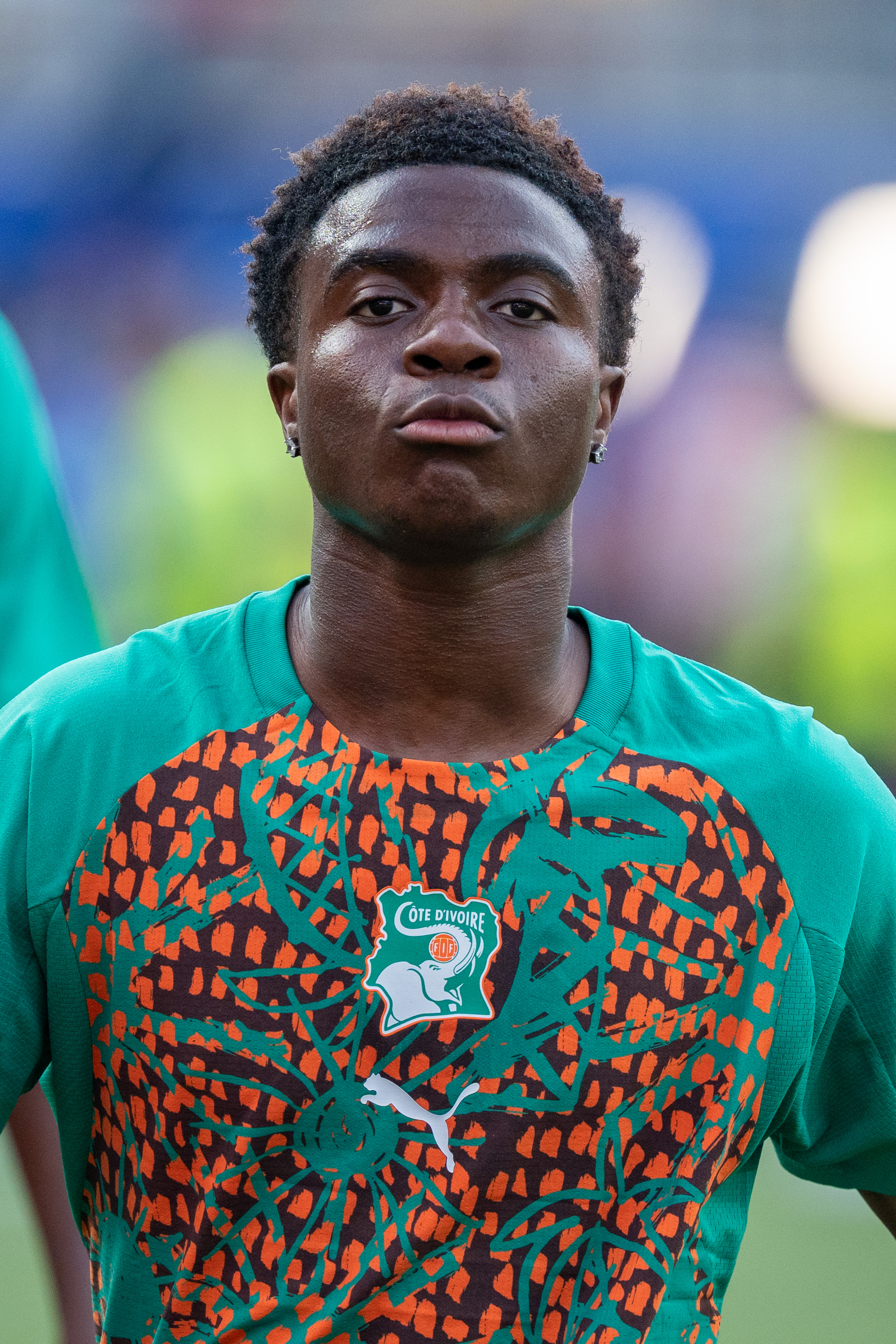
- Inao with the Ivory Coast in 2026

Personal information
- Full name: Christ Ravynel Inao Oulaï
- Date of birth: 6 April 2006 (age 20)
- Place of birth: Yopougon, Ivory Coast
- Height: 1.73 m (5 ft 8 in)
- Position: Midfielder

Team information
- Current team: Fiorentina
- Number: 42

Youth career
- 2018–2024: JMG Academy

Senior career*
Years	Team	Apps	(Gls)
2024–2025	Bastia II	6	(0)
2024–2025	Bastia	16	(1)
2025–2026	Trabzonspor	25	(2)
2026–	Fiorentina	3	(0)

International career^{‡}
2025–	Ivory Coast	17	(1)
- * Club domestic league appearances and goals as of 17:04, 10 October 2026 (UTC) ‡ National team caps and goals as of 20:20, 17 November 2026 (UTC)

Christ Ravynel Inao Oulaï (born 6 April 2006) is an Ivorian professional footballer who plays as a midfielder for Serie A club Fiorentina and the Ivory Coast national team.

== Club career ==
Inao joined the youth academy of JMG Academy at the age of 12, where he finished his development.

On 6 July 2024, he joined France's Bastia in Ligue 2. He made his senior debut with Bastia in a 4–0 Coupe de France win over FC Freymingon 16 November 2024. On 14 April 2025, he scored his first career goal in a 5–2 victory over Laval.

On 22 August 2025, Inao transferred to Turkish club Trabzonspor, signing a five-year contract. Later that year, on 25 October, he scored his first goal for the club in a 2–0 Süper Lig win over Eyüpspor.

On 19 July 2026, Inao joined Serie A side Fiorentina.

== International career ==
Inao received his first call-up to the Ivory Coast national team in November 2025 for two friendly matches against Saudi Arabia and Oman.

He was included in Ivory Coast's squad for the 2025 Africa Cup of Nations in Morocco. On 31 December 2025, during the group stage, he was named Man of the Match in a 3–2 victory over Gabon.

On 15 May 2026, Inao was named by Ivory Coast head coach Emerse Faé in the 26-man squad for the 2026 FIFA World Cup.

== Career statistics ==
=== Club ===
As of match played 10 October 2026

Appearances and goals by club, season and competition
Club	Season	League			National cup (Note: Includes Coupe de France, Turkish Cup)		Total	
Club	Season	Division	Apps	Goals	Apps	Goals	Apps	Goals
Bastia II	2024–25	Championnat National 3	6	56	—		6	0
Bastia	2024–25	Ligue 2	16	1	2	0	18	1
Trabzonspor	2025–26	Süper Lig	25	2	1	0	26	2
Fiorentina	2026–27	Serie A	3	0	1	0	4	0
Career total			50	3	4	0	54	3

=== International ===
As of match played 17 November 2026

Appearances and goals by national team and year
National team	Year	Apps	Goals
Ivory Coast	2025	3	0
Ivory Coast	2026	14	1
Total		17	1

== Honours ==
Trabzonspor

- Turkish Cup: 2025–26
