= Víctor Valdepeñas =

Spanish footballer (born 2006)

Personal information
- Full name: Víctor Valdepeñas Talavera
- Date of birth: 20 October 2006 (age 20)
- Place of birth: Madrid, Spain
- Height: 1.88 m (6 ft 2 in)
- Positions: Centre-back; left-back

Team information
- Current team: Fiorentina
- Number: 21

Youth career
- 2011–2016: Villa Rosa
- 2016–2018: Rayo Vallecano
- 2018–2020: Real Madrid
- 2020–2022: Leganés
- 2022–2024: Real Madrid

Senior career*
Years	Team	Apps	(Gls)
2024–2025	Real Madrid C	6	(1)
2024–2026	Real Madrid B	44	(2)
2025–2026	Real Madrid	1	(0)
2026–	Fiorentina	8	(1)

International career^{‡}
2025–	Spain U19	5	(0)
- * Club domestic league appearances and goals as of 22:20, 2 November 2026 (UTC) ‡ National team caps and goals as of 21:45, 14 December 2025 (UTC)

Víctor "Valde" Valdepeñas Talavera (born 20 October 2006) is a Spanish footballer who plays as a centre-back or left-back for Serie A club Fiorentina.

== Early life ==
Valdepeñas was born in Madrid, to an Asturian father.

== Club career ==
As a youth player, Valdepeñas joined the youth academy of AD Villa Rosa. In 2016, he joined the youth academy of Rayo Vallecano. Two years later, he joined the youth academy of La Liga side Real Madrid. Subsequently, he joined the youth academy of Leganés. During the summer of 2022, he returned to the youth academy of La Liga side Real Madrid and was promoted to the club's C team in 2024 before being promoted to their reserve team the same year.

Valdepeñas made his full debut for the senior Real Madrid team on 14 December 2025 in a league victory against Alavés. He started in the match and played 78 minutes.

On 31 July 2026, Valdepeñas signed for Serie A club Fiorentina.

== Style of play ==
Valdepeñas plays as a defender and is left-footed. Spanish newspaper Marca wrote in 2025 that "his physical condition stands out... this allows him to occupy the positions of full-back, wing-back... and midfielder.

== Career statistics ==
As of match played 2 November 2026

Appearances and goals by club, season and competition
Club	Season	League			National cup		Europe		Other		Total	
Club	Season	Division	Apps	Goals	Apps	Goals	Apps	Goals	Apps	Goals	Apps	Goals
Real Madrid C	2024–25	Segunda Federación	6	1	—		—		—		6	1
Real Madrid B	2024–25	Primera Federación	14	1	—		—		—		14	1
Real Madrid B	2025–26	Primera Federación	30	2	—		—		2 (Note: Appearances in Premier League Cup)	0	32	2
Real Madrid B	Total		44	3	—		—		2	0	46	3
Real Madrid	2025–26	La Liga	1	0	0	0	0	0	0	0	1	0
Fiorentina	2026–27	Serie A	8	1	2	0	—		—		10	1
Career total			59	5	2	0	0	0	2	0	63	5
