= Alieu Njie =

Alieu Njie may refer to:

- Alieu "Al" Njie (born 1955), American soccer player
- Alieu Njie (footballer, born 2005), Swedish footballer
