= David Jiménez (footballer) =

Spanish footballer (born 2004)

Personal information
- Full name: David Jiménez Corredor
- Date of birth: 14 March 2004 (age 22)
- Place of birth: Madrid, Spain
- Height: 1.70 m (5 ft 7 in)
- Position: Right-back

Team information
- Current team: Oviedo

Youth career
- 2010–2013: Móstoles URJC
- 2013–2023: Real Madrid

Senior career*
Years	Team	Apps	(Gls)
2023–2024	Real Madrid C	32	(1)
2023–2026	Real Madrid B	66	(4)
2025–2026	Real Madrid	2	(0)
2026–	Oviedo	0	(0)

International career
2022–2023	Spain U19	2	(0)
- * Club domestic league appearances and goals as of 9:25, 31 May 2026 (UTC)

David Jiménez Corredor (born 14 March 2004) is a Spanish footballer currently playing as a right-back for Real Oviedo.

== Club career ==
Jiménez is a youth product of Juventud URJC, before moving to the youth academy of Real Madrid in 2013 where he finished his development. He was promoted to Real Madrid C for the 2023–24 season, and later in the season made his debut for their second team - Real Madrid Castilla. He was called up to the matchday squad for the senior Real Madrid team for a La Liga match against Alavés on 24 September 2024. On 17 December 2025, he debuted with the senior Real Madrid team in a 3–2 Copa del Rey win over CF Talavera de la Reina.

On 31 August 2026, Jiménez joined Segunda División side Real Oviedo on a three-year contract.

== International career ==
Jiménez was part of the Spain U19 squad at the 2023 UEFA European Under-19 Championship.

== Career statistics ==
As of match played 23 May 2026

Appearances and goals by club, season and competition
Club	Season	League			Copa del Rey		Europe		Other		Total	
Club	Season	Division	Apps	Goals	Apps	Goals	Apps	Goals	Apps	Goals	Apps	Goals
Real Madrid C	2023–24	Tercera Federación	32	1	—		—		—		32	1
Real Madrid Castilla	2023–24	Primera Federación	1	0	—		—		—		1	0
Real Madrid Castilla	2024–25	Primera Federación	37	3	—		—		—		37	3
Real Madrid Castilla	2025–26	Primera Federación	28	1	—		—		—		28	1
Real Madrid Castilla	Total		66	4	—		—		—		66	4
Real Madrid	2025–26	La Liga	2	0	2	0	0	0	0	0	4	0
Career total			100	5	2	0	0	0	0	0	100	5
