= Mateo Pellegrino =

Professional footballer (born 2001)

Personal information
- Full name: Mateo Pellegrino Casalanguila
- Date of birth: 22 October 2001 (age 25)
- Place of birth: Valencia, Spain
- Height: 1.92 m (6 ft 4 in)
- Position: Centre-forward

Team information
- Current team: Fiorentina
- Number: 32

Youth career
- Valencia
- Inter Milan
- 2018–2021: Vélez Sarsfield

Senior career*
Years	Team	Apps	(Gls)
2021–2025	Vélez Sarsfield	10	(0)
2022–2023	→ Estudiantes (loan)	14	(0)
2023–2024	→ Platense (loan)	51	(15)
2025–2026	Parma	50	(12)
2026–	Fiorentina	11	(4)
- * Club domestic league appearances and goals as of 23:04, 8 November 2026 (UTC)

Mateo Pellegrino Casalánguida (born 22 October 2001) is a professional footballer who plays as a centre-forward for Serie A club Fiorentina.

== Club career ==
Pellegrino played in various youth academies across Europe due to his father's footballing commitments on the continent, with the centre-forward notably appearing for Valencia and Inter Milan. In 2018, Pellegrino joined the Vélez Sarsfield academy; a few years before his father would become manager at first-team level. He was promoted to the senior set-up for the first time in January 2021. He soon appeared on the substitute's bench for a Copa de la Liga Profesional fixture with Rosario Central on 16 January, though he went unused in a 3–1 away win. His debut arrived under father Mauricio in the same competition on 31 March against Banfield. On 27 June 2022, Pellegrino joined fellow league club Estudiantes on loan until June 2023 with a purchase option.

On 3 February 2025, Pellegrino signed with Parma in Italy.

== International career ==
Born to Argentine parents, Pellegrino is eligible to represent both Spain and Argentina at international level. In September 2019 saw Pellegrino receive a training call-up from Fernando Batista's Argentina U19s.

== Style of play ==
Before becoming a centre-forward, Pellegrino played as a left-back and as a winger. He cites Romelu Lukaku and Lucas Pratto as players who he shapes his game on.

== Personal life ==
Pellegrino is the son of football manager and former footballer Mauricio Pellegrino, while uncle Maximiliano was also a professional footballer. He was born in Valencia, Spain while his father was playing in La Liga for the football club of the same name.

== Career statistics ==
As of match played 8 November 2026

Appearances and goals by club, season and competition
Club	Season	League			National cup (Note: Includes Copa Argentina, Coppa Italia)		Continental		Total	
Club	Season	Division	Apps	Goals	Apps	Goals	Apps	Goals	Apps	Goals
Vélez Sarsfield	2020–21	Liga Profesional de Fútbol	1	0	—		—		1	0
Vélez Sarsfield	2021	Liga Profesional de Fútbol	7	0	—		1 (Note: Appearances in Copa Libertadores)	0	8	0
Vélez Sarsfield	2022	Liga Profesional de Fútbol	1	0	1	1	2	0	4	1
Vélez Sarsfield	2025	Liga Profesional de Fútbol	1	0	—		—		1	0
Vélez Sarsfield	Total		10	0	1	1	3	0	14	1
Estudiantes (loan)	2022	Liga Profesional de Fútbol	5	0	—		2	0	7	0
Estudiantes (loan)	2023	Liga Profesional de Fútbol	9	0	1	0	2 (Note: Appearances in Copa Sudamericana)	0	12	0
Estudiantes (loan)	Total		14	0	1	0	4	0	19	0
Platense (loan)	2023	Liga Profesional de Fútbol	13	0	—		—		13	0
Platense (loan)	2024	Liga Profesional de Fútbol	38	15	2	0	—		40	15
Platense (loan)	Total		51	15	2	0	—		53	15
Parma	2024–25	Serie A	13	3	—		—		13	3
Parma	2025–26	Serie A	37	9	2	3	—		39	12
Parma	Total		50	12	2	3	—		52	15
Fiorentina	2026–27	Serie A	11	4	1	1	—		12	5
Career total			136	31	7	5	7	0	150	36
