= Manu Serrano =

Spanish footballer (born 2004)

Personal information
- Full name: Manuel Serrano Salazar
- Date of birth: 20 March 2004 (age 22)
- Place of birth: Pinto, Spain
- Height: 1.75 m (5 ft 9 in)
- Position: Left-back

Team information
- Current team: Real Madrid
- Number: 51

Youth career
- 2010–2013: Quintana
- 2013–2014: Ciudad de Pinto
- 2014–2018: Getafe
- 2018–2023: Real Madrid

Senior career*
Years	Team	Apps	(Gls)
2023–2025	Real Madrid C	64	(2)
2023–	Real Madrid B	21	(0)
2026–	Real Madrid	1	(0)

International career^{‡}
2019–2020	Spain U16	2	(0)
- * Club domestic league appearances and goals as of 24 May 2026 ‡ National team caps and goals as of 30 December 2025

Manuel Serrano Salazar (born 20 March 2004) is a Spanish footballer who plays as a left-back for Real Madrid.

== Early life ==
Serrano was born on 20 March 2004 in Pinto, Madrid, Spain.

== Career ==
As a youth player, Serrano played for local clubs Quintana and Ciudad de Pinto before joining the youth academy of Getafe. In 2018, he joined the Real Madrid youth academy at the age of 14. After progressing through the youth teams, he began playing for Real Madrid C, making 66 appearances and scoring 2 goals. In 2023, he was officially promoted to Real Madrid Castilla, where he has made 13 appearances in competitive matches.

During his time in the youth setup, he won honours such as the Copa de Campeones Juvenil (Youth Champions Cup) in 2023. Serrano has also represented Spain at under-16 level, appearing in official youth internationals.

Serrano made his debut for Real Madrid on 23 May 2026, coming on in the 84th minute for Dani Carvajal in his final match against Athletic Bilbao.

== Style of Play ==
Serrano is primarily a defender, known for being fast, agile, and strong. He has been praised for his ability to complement defensive partners effectively and has also demonstrated attacking contributions, notably scoring with an overhead kick in the 2023 Copa de Campeones final, reminiscent of Gareth Bale’s goal in the 2018 Champions League final.

== Career statistics ==
As of match played 23 May 2026

Appearances and goals by club, season and competition
Club	Season	League			Other		Total	
Club	Season	Division	Apps	Goals	Apps	Goals	Apps	Goals
Real Madrid C	2023–24	Tercera Federación	31	2	—		31	2
Real Madrid C	2024–25	Segunda Federación	33	0	2 (Note: Appearances in 2025 Segunda Federación play-offs)	0	35	0
Real Madrid C	Total		64	2	2	0	66	2
Real Madrid B	2024–25	Primera Federación	1	0	—		1	0
Real Madrid B	2025–26	Primera Federación	20	0	0	0	20	0
Real Madrid B	Total		21	0	0	0	21	0
Real Madrid	2025–26	La Liga	1	0	0	0	1	0
Real Madrid	Total		1	0	0	0	1	0
Career total			86	2	0	0	86	2
