= 2025–26 Real Madrid CF season =

Real Madrid
2025–26 season
- President: Florentino Pérez
- Head coach: Xabi Alonso (until 12 January); Álvaro Arbeloa (from 12 January)
- Stadium: Bernabéu
- La Liga: 2nd
- Copa del Rey: Round of 16
- Supercopa de España: Runners-up
- UEFA Champions League: Quarter-finals
- Top goalscorer: League: Kylian Mbappé (25); All: Kylian Mbappé (42)
- Highest home attendance: 78,107 vs Barcelona
- Lowest home attendance: 61,468 vs Alavés
- Average home league attendance: 71,549
- Biggest win: 5–0 vs Kairat; 6–1 vs Monaco
- Biggest defeat: 2–5 vs Atlético Madrid
Home colours	Away colours	Third colours

The 2025–26 season was Real Madrid Club de Fútbol's 122nd season in existence and the club's 95th consecutive season in the top flight of Spanish football. In addition to the domestic league, Real Madrid participated in this season's editions of the Copa del Rey, the Supercopa de España and the UEFA Champions League.

This season was the first since 2011–12 without Luka Modrić, as well as the first since 2014–15 without youth graduate Lucas Vázquez, who both departed as free agents, to AC Milan and Bayer Leverkusen, respectively.

== Summary ==
=== Pre-season ===
On 17 May 2025, during the 2024–25 season, Madrid announced the signing of Dean Huijsen from Bournemouth, with the Spanish center-back joining the club on 1 June and signing a five-year contract. On 22 May, Madrid announced the departure of the club captain Luka Modrić after 13 years in the club, who left as Real's most decorated player, having won 28 trophies. On 23 May, Madrid and Carlo Ancelotti announced their mutual decision to part ways after the conclusion of the 2024–25 La Liga campaign, with the Italian coach leaving as the most decorated manager in the history of the club with 15 trophies. On 25 May, Madrid announced the appointment of Xabi Alonso as their new manager for the next three seasons, starting from 1 June. On 30 May, Madrid and Liverpool announced an agreement for the transfer of Trent Alexander-Arnold, with the Englishman joining the club on 1 June on a six-year deal. On the same day, the club announced the departure of Jesús Vallejo upon the expiration of his contract. On 13 June, Madrid announced that Franco Mastantuono would join the club from River Plate on 14 August, penning a six-year deal with the player. On 14 July, Madrid brought back their youth academy product Álvaro Carreras, signing him from Benfica on a six-year contract. Two days later, Madrid announced the departure of Lucas Vázquez, who spent 10 seasons at the club and won 23 trophies. On 8 August, Madrid extended Gonzalo García's contract until 2030 and promoted him to the first team from Castilla.

=== August ===
Madrid started their La Liga campaign on 19 August with a 1–0 home win over Osasuna, thanks to a converted penalty from Kylian Mbappé. Five days later, Madrid faced newly-promoted Oviedo away from home, winning 3–0 with a brace from Mbappé and Vinícius Júnior's goal. On 30 August, goals from Arda Güler and Vinícius helped Madrid to come from behind and get a 2–1 victory over Mallorca at the Bernabéu.

=== September ===
On 13 September, the first match on the month ended in a ten-man 2–1 win over Real Sociedad at the Anoeta Stadium, as Mbappé and Güler got on the scoresheet. Three days later, Mbappé's brace from the penalty spot rescued three points for the team, as ten-man Madrid beat Marseille 2–1 in the opening matchday of the Champions League league phase. On 20 September, Madrid continued their winning streak with a 2–0 victory against Espanyol, with Éder Militão and Mbappé scoring for the team. Three days later, goals from Vinícius and Mastantuono, a debut one for the Argentinian, and Mbappé's brace helped Madrid to a 4–1 win at Levante. On 27 September, Madrid suffered their first defeat of the season in a 2–5 loss to Atlético Madrid with goals from Mbappé and Güler, conceding five to Madrid derby rivals for the first time since 1950. Three days later, courtesy of a hat-trick from Mbappé and goals from Eduardo Camavinga and Brahim Díaz, Los Blancos beat their Champions League opponents Kairat 5–0.

=== October ===
On 4 October, Vinícius' brace combined with a goal from Mbappé gave Madrid a 3–1 league win over Villarreal at the Bernabéu. On 19 October, Madrid returned from the international break, winning 1–0 at Getafe with a lone goal from Mbappé. Three days later, Jude Bellingham's winner gave Madrid a 1–0 Champions League league phase home win over Juventus. On 26 October, Madrid ended their four-match El Clásico losing streak, defeating Barcelona 2–1 at the Bernabéu, thanks to goals from Mbappé and Bellingham.

=== November ===
Madrid started the month on 1 November, trashing Valencia 4–0, as a brace from Mbappé and goals from Bellingham and Carreras, a debut one for the Spaniard, helped Real to take the win. Three days later, Madrid lost their Champions League match against Liverpool 0–1 away from home. On 9 November, Madrid's away game versus Rayo Vallecano ended in a 0–0 stalemate. Returning from another international break on 23 November, the debut goal from Huijsen and a tap-in from Bellingham rescued one point for Madrid in a 2–2 draw at Elche. Three days later, Mbappé scored four goals to seal a 4–3 Champions League win over Olympiacos for Real. On 30 November, Madrid dropped points in La Liga for the third time in a row, drawing 1–1 away against Girona with a goal from Mbappé.

=== December ===
First match of the month ended with a 3–0 away win at Athletic Bilbao on 3 December, ending Madrid's three-match league winless streak, as Mbappé got on the scoresheet twice, as well as Camavinga. Four days later, Celta Vigo handed Madrid a 0–2 defeat at the Bernabéu. On 10 December, Madrid faced Manchester City at home in the Champions League, but were unable to earn any points, losing 1–2 with a goal from Rodrygo. Four days later, goals from Mbappé and Rodrygo earned Madrid a 2–1 win at Alavés. On 17 December, Madrid entered this season's Copa del Rey edition, beating Talavera de la Reina 3–2 through Mbappé's brace and an own goal. Three days later, Madrid closed the year on a high, getting a 2–0 win over Sevilla, courtesy of goals from Bellingham and Mbappé. On 23 December, Madrid loaned out Endrick to Lyon until the end of the season.

=== January ===
On 4 January, Madrid started their year, as Gonzalo García's hat-trick and goals from Raúl Asencio and Fran García gave Real a crushing 5–1 victory over Real Betis. Four days later, goals from Valverde and Rodrygo helped Madrid to get a 2–1 win over city rivals Atlético Madrid and reach the Supercopa de España final. On 11 January, goals from Vinícius and Gonzalo García were not enough for success in the Supercopa de España final, as Madrid finished as runners-up with a 2–3 loss against Barcelona. The next day, Madrid and Alonso parted ways by mutual agreement, with Álvaro Arbeloa being appointed the new head coach. Two days later, Arbeloa's first match ended in an disappointing early Copa del Rey exit, as Madrid lost 2–3 to second-division Albacete with goals from Mastantuono and Gonzalo García. On 17 January, Madrid returned to winning ways, beating Levante 2–0 at home, as Mbappé and Asencio got on the scoresheet. Three days later, Mbappé's brace and strikes from Mastantuono, Vinícius and Bellingham, as well as an own goal, saw Madrid take a dominating 6–1 win over Monaco in the Champions League. On 24 January, two goals from Mbappé sealed three points for Madrid, as Real won 2–0 against Villarreal at the La Cerámica. Four days later, Madrid suffered a 2–4 defeat against Benfica in the Champions League, with Mbappé scoring both goals for the team, and dropped out of the top eight, having to play in the knockout phase play-offs for the second season in a row.

=== February ===
On 1 February, a goal from Vinícius and Mbappé's injury time penalty winner gave Madrid a 2–1 win over Rayo Vallecano. A week later, Madrid beat Valencia 2–0 on the road, as Carreras and Mbappé got on the scoresheet. On 14 February, Gonzalo García's goal, a double from Vinícius and a strike from Valverde helped Madrid to a 4–1 victory over Real Sociedad. Three days later, a lone goal from Vinícius sealed a 1–0 win over knockout phase play-offs opponents Benfica in the first leg. On 21 February, Madrid suffered a 1–2 loss at Osasuna, as Vinícius' goal was not enough for any points. Four days later, Madrid played the return leg of the knockout phase play-offs, as goals from Aurélien Tchouaméni and Vinícius secured a 2–1 victory against Benfica and progression to the round of 16 with a 3–1 win on aggregate.

=== March ===
On 2 March, Madrid's first game of the month turned out to be their second consecutive league defeat, losing to Getafe 0–1 at home. Four days later, a goal from Tchouaméni, as well as Valverde's late winner, gave Madrid three points in a 2–1 win over Celta Vigo. On 11 March, Madrid faced Manchester City, playing the English side for the fifth consecutive Champions League knockout phase, as a hat-trick from Valverde saw Madrid to take a 3–0 victory in the first leg of round of 16. Four days later, Madrid got a 4–1 win against Elche, as Antonio Rüdiger, Valverde, Huijsen and Güler got on the scoresheet. On 17 March, Madrid booked their place in the Champions League quarter-finals with a 2–1 win at Manchester City and 5–1 on aggregate, as Vinícius scored both goals for the team. Five days later, another brace from Vinícius and Valverde's goal led Real to a 3–2 Madrid derby win over Atlético Madrid.

=== April ===
On 4 April, Madrid were beaten by Mallorca 1–2 on the road, with Militão scoring the only goal for Real. Three days later, Madrid suffered a narrow 1–2 defeat at home against Bayern Munich in the first leg of the Champions League quarter-final, as only Mbappé got on the scoresheet at the Bernabéu. On 10 April, Madrid were unable to get a win for the third match in a row, as they were held to a 1–1 draw against Girona with a goal from Valverde. Five days later, Madrid's Champions League campaign ended in a dramatic exit, as despite Güler's double and a goal from Mbappé, Real lost 3–4 at Allianz Arena and 4–6 on aggregate against the quarter-final's return leg opponents Bayern Munich. On 21 April, Madrid secured their first win in the last five matches, as goals from Mbappé and Vinícius gave Real a 2–1 victory over Alavés. Three days later, Madrid dropped points in the league once again, as they were held to a 1–1 draw at Real Betis with a goal from Vinícius.

=== May ===
On 3 May, Madrid got a 2–0 win over Espanyol, thanks to a brace from Vinícius. Aurélien Tchouaméni and Federico Valverde were involved in an altercation during training on 7 May that resulted in Valverde being knocked unconscious. Both players were fined €500,000 by the club. On 10 May, Madrid suffered a 0–2 defeat against Barcelona in El Clásico at the Spotify Camp Nou. The loss confirmed Barcelona as La Liga champions and condemned Madrid to a trophyless season for the first time since the 2020–21 campaign. Four days later, Madrid got a 2–0 home victory over Oviedo, courtesy of goals from Gonzalo García and Bellingham. On 17 May, a loan goal from Vinícius sealed a 1–0 win at Sevilla for Madrid. On 23 May, Madrid concluded the season with a 4–2 home victory over Athletic Bilbao with goals from Gonzalo García, Bellingham, Mbappé and Brahim. This game also marked the last appearance for Dani Carvajal and David Alaba with the club.

== Kits ==
Home	Home alt.	Away	Third

Goalkeeper 1	Goalkeeper 2	Goalkeeper 3	Goalkeeper 4	Goalkeeper 5

== Players ==
Note: Flags indicate national team as defined under FIFA eligibility rules; some limited exceptions apply. Players may hold more than one non-FIFA nationality.

No.	Pos.	Nation	Player
1	GK	BEL	Thibaut Courtois
2	DF	ESP	Dani Carvajal (captain)
3	DF	BRA	Éder Militão
4	DF	AUT	David Alaba
5	MF	ENG	Jude Bellingham
6	MF	FRA	Eduardo Camavinga
7	FW	BRA	Vinícius Júnior
8	MF	URU	Federico Valverde (vice-captain)
10	FW	FRA	Kylian Mbappé
11	FW	BRA	Rodrygo
12	DF	ENG	Trent Alexander-Arnold
13	GK	UKR	Andriy Lunin

No.	Pos.	Nation	Player
14	MF	FRA	Aurélien Tchouaméni
15	MF	TUR	Arda Güler
16	FW	ESP	Gonzalo García
17	DF	ESP	Raúl Asencio
18	DF	ESP	Álvaro Carreras
19	MF	ESP	Dani Ceballos
20	DF	ESP	Fran García
21	FW	MAR	Brahim Díaz
22	DF	GER	Antonio Rüdiger
23	DF	FRA	Ferland Mendy
24	DF	ESP	Dean Huijsen
30	FW	ARG	Franco Mastantuono

=== Out on loan ===
Note: Flags indicate national team as defined under FIFA eligibility rules; some limited exceptions apply. Players may hold more than one non-FIFA nationality.

No.	Pos.	Nation	Player
9	FW	BRA	Endrick (at Lyon from 1 January until 30 June 2026)

== Transfers ==
=== In ===
Date	Pos.	Player	From	Type	Ref.
1 June 2025	DF	(Spain) Dean Huijsen	(England) Bournemouth	Transfer	
1 June 2025	DF	(England) Trent Alexander-Arnold	(England) Liverpool	Transfer	
14 July 2025	DF	(Spain) Álvaro Carreras	(Portugal) Benfica	Transfer	
28 July 2025	DF	(Spain) Raúl Asencio	Real Madrid Castilla	Promotion	
8 August 2025	FW	(Spain) Gonzalo García	Real Madrid Castilla	Promotion	
14 August 2025	FW	(Argentina) Franco Mastantuono	(Argentina) River Plate	Transfer	

=== Out ===
Date	Pos.	Player	To	Type	Ref.
1 June 2025	DF	(Spain) Jesús Vallejo	Albacete	End of contract	
9 July 2025	MF	(Croatia) Luka Modrić	(Italy) AC Milan	End of contract	
16 July 2025	DF	(Spain) Lucas Vázquez	(Germany) Bayer Leverkusen	End of contract	
1 January 2026	FW	(Brazil) Endrick	(France) Lyon	Loan	

=== Contract renewals ===
Date	Pos.	Player	Contract length	Contract ends	Ref.
8 August 2025	FW	(Spain) Gonzalo García	Three years	2030	

== Pre-season and friendlies ==
On 1 August 2025, Real Madrid announced a friendly match against WSG Tirol.

8 August 2025 1	Real Madrid	4–1	Leganés	Madrid
10:30 UTC+2	Brahim; Huijsen; Militão; Pitarch	Report	Sule	Stadium: Ciudad Real Madrid; Attendance: 0 (Note: The match was played behind closed doors.)

12 August 2025 2	WSG Tirol	0–4	Real Madrid	Innsbruck, Austria
19:00 UTC+2		Report	Militão 10'; Mbappé 13', 59'; Rodrygo 81'	Stadium: Tivoli Stadion Tirol; Referee: Markus Hameter (Austria)

== Competitions ==
=== Overview ===
Competition	First match	Last match	Starting round	Final position	Record							
Competition	First match	Last match	Starting round	Final position	Pld	W	D	L	GF	GA	GD	Win %
La Liga	19 August 2025	23 May 2026	Matchday 1	2nd	38	27	5	6	77	35	+42	71.05
Copa del Rey	17 December 2025	14 January 2026	Round of 32	Round of 16	2	1	0	1	5	5	+0	50.00
Supercopa de España	8 January 2026	11 January 2026	Semi-finals	Runners-up	2	1	0	1	4	4	+0	50.00
UEFA Champions League	16 September 2025	15 April 2026	League phase	Quarter-finals	14	9	0	5	33	20	+13	64.29
Total					56	38	5	13	119	64	+55	67.86

Source: Soccerway

=== La Liga ===
==== League table ====
Pos	Team	Pld	W	D	L	GF	GA	GD	Pts	Qualification or relegation
1	Barcelona (C)	38	31	1	6	95	36	+59	94	Qualification for the Champions League league phase (Note: La Liga gained an additional Champions League place as a result of Spain gaining one of the two European Performance Spots (EPS) awarded to the two associations with the highest UEFA coefficient points in 2025–26.)
2	Real Madrid	38	27	5	6	77	35	+42	86	Qualification for the Champions League league phase
3	Villarreal	38	22	6	10	72	46	+26	72	Qualification for the Champions League league phase
4	Atlético Madrid	38	21	6	11	62	44	+18	69	Qualification for the Champions League league phase
5	Real Betis	38	15	15	8	59	48	+11	60	Qualification for the Champions League league phase

Source: LaLiga EA Sports
Rules for classification: 1) Points; 2) Head-to-head points; 3) Head-to-head goal difference; 4) Goal difference; 5) Goals scored; 6) Fair-play points
(Note: Head-to-head record is used only after all the matches between the teams in question have been played)
(C) Champions

==== Results summary ====
Overall								Home						Away					
Pld	W	D	L	GF	GA	GD	Pts	W	D	L	GF	GA	GD	W	D	L	GF	GA	GD
38	27	5	6	77	35	+42	86	16	1	2	45	16	+29	11	4	4	32	19	+13

Source: La Liga

==== Results by round ====
Round	1	2	3	4	5	6	7	8	9	10	11	12	13	14	15	16	17	18	19	20	21	22	23	24	25	26	27	28	29	30	31	32	33	34	35	36	37	38
Ground	H	A	H	A	H	A	A	H	A	H	H	A	A	A	A	H	A	H	H	H	A	H	A	H	A	H	A	H	H	A	H	H	A	A	A	H	A	H
Result	W	W	W	W	W	W	L	W	W	W	W	D	D	D	W	L	W	W	W	W	W	W	W	W	L	L	W	W	W	L	D	W	D	W	L	W	W	W
Position	8	3	1	1	1	1	2	1	1	1	1	1	1	2	2	2	2	2	2	2	2	2	2	1	2	2	2	2	2	2	2	2	2	2	2	2	2	2

Source: La Liga
A = Away; H = Home; W = Win; D = Draw; L = Loss

==== Matches ====
The league fixtures were announced on 1 July 2025.

19 August 2025 1	Real Madrid	1–0	Osasuna	Madrid
21:00 UTC+2	Mbappé 51' (pen.)	Report	Bretones (red card) 90+4'	Stadium: Bernabéu; Attendance: 68,407; Referee: Adrián Cordero Vega

24 August 2025 2	Oviedo	0–3	Real Madrid	Oviedo
21:30 UTC+2		Report	Mbappé 37', 82'; Vinícius 90+2'	Stadium: Carlos Tartiere; Attendance: 29,758; Referee: Ricardo de Burgos Bengoetxea

30 August 2025 3	Real Madrid	2–1	Mallorca	Madrid
21:30 UTC+2	Güler 37'; Vinícius 38'	Report	Muriqi 18'	Stadium: Bernabéu; Attendance: 72,699; Referee: José María Sánchez Martínez

13 September 2025 4	Real Sociedad	1–2	Real Madrid	San Sebastián
16:15 UTC+2	Oyarzabal 56' (pen.)	Report	Mbappé 12'; Huijsen (red card) 32'; Güler 44'	Stadium: Reale Arena; Attendance: 36,958; Referee: Jesús Gil Manzano

20 September 2025 5	Real Madrid	2–0	Espanyol	Madrid
16:15 UTC+2	Militão 22'; Mbappé 47'	Report		Stadium: Bernabéu; Attendance: 73,466; Referee: Juan Martínez Munuera

23 September 2025 6	Levante	1–4	Real Madrid	Valencia
21:30 UTC+2	Etta Eyong 54'	Report	Vinícius 28'; Mastantuono 38'; Mbappé 64' (pen.), 66'	Stadium: Ciutat de València; Attendance: 23,361; Referee: Isidro Díaz de Mera Escuderos

27 September 2025 7	Atlético Madrid	5–2	Real Madrid	Madrid
16:15 UTC+2	Le Normand 14'; Sørloth 45+3'; Alvarez 51' (pen.), 63'; Griezmann 90+3'	Report	Mbappé 25'; Güler 36'	Stadium: Riyadh Air Metropolitano; Attendance: 69,167; Referee: Javier Alberola Rojas

4 October 2025 8	Real Madrid	3–1	Villarreal	Madrid
21:00 UTC+2	Vinícius 47', 69' (pen.); Mbappé 81'	Report	Mikautadze 73'; Mouriño (yellow card) 21' (yellow-red card) 77'	Stadium: Bernabéu; Attendance: 75,216; Referee: Guillermo Cuadra Fernández

19 October 2025 9	Getafe	0–1	Real Madrid	Getafe
21:00 UTC+2	Nyom (red card) 77'; Sancris (yellow card) 74' (yellow-red card) 84'	Report	Mbappé 80'	Stadium: Coliseum; Attendance: 10,090; Referee: José Luis Munuera Montero

26 October 2025 10	Real Madrid	2–1	Barcelona	Madrid
16:15 UTC+1	Mbappé 21'; Bellingham 43'; Lunin (red card) 90+9'	Report	Fermín 38'; Pedri (yellow card) 41' (yellow-red card) 90+9'	Stadium: Bernabéu; Attendance: 78,107; Referee: César Soto Grado

1 November 2025 11	Real Madrid	4–0	Valencia	Madrid
21:00 UTC+1	Mbappé 19' (pen.), 31'; Bellingham 44'; Carreras 82'	Report		Stadium: Bernabéu; Attendance: 74,796; Referee: Mateo Busquets Ferrer

9 November 2025 12	Rayo Vallecano	0–0	Real Madrid	Madrid
16:15 UTC+1		Report		Stadium: Vallecas; Attendance: 14,468; Referee: Juan Martínez Munuera

23 November 2025 13	Elche	2–2	Real Madrid	Elche
21:00 UTC+1	Febas 53'; Rodríguez 84'; Chust (yellow card) 68' (yellow-red card) 90+6'	Report	Huijsen 78'; Bellingham 87'	Stadium: Martínez Valero; Attendance: 31,024; Referee: Francisco Hernández Maeso

30 November 2025 14	Girona	1–1	Real Madrid	Girona
21:00 UTC+1	Ounahi 45'	Report	Mbappé 67' (pen.)	Stadium: Montilivi; Attendance: 14,005; Referee: Ricardo de Burgos Bengoetxea

3 December 2025 15	Athletic Bilbao	0–3	Real Madrid	Bilbao
19:00 UTC+1		Report	Mbappé 7', 59'; Camavinga 42'	Stadium: San Mamés; Attendance: 51,313; Referee: Jesús Gil Manzano
Note: The match date was pushed forward due to both clubs' involvement in the 2026 Supercopa de España.

7 December 2025 16	Real Madrid	0–2	Celta Vigo	Madrid
21:00 UTC+1	F. García (yellow card) 63' (yellow-red card) 64'; Carreras (yellow card) 90+1' (red card) 90+1'; Endrick (red card) 90+2'	Report	Swedberg 53', 90+3'	Stadium: Bernabéu; Attendance: 74,511; Referee: Alejandro Quintero González

14 December 2025 17	Alavés	1–2	Real Madrid	Vitoria-Gasteiz
21:00 UTC+1	Vicente 68'	Report	Mbappé 24'; Rodrygo 76'	Stadium: Mendizorrotza; Attendance: 19,290; Referee: Víctor García Verdura

20 December 2025 18	Real Madrid	2–0	Sevilla	Madrid
21:00 UTC+1	Bellingham 38'; Mbappé 86' (pen.)	Report	Marcão (yellow card) 37' (yellow-red card) 68'	Stadium: Bernabéu; Attendance: 72,062; Referee: Alejandro Muñiz Ruiz

4 January 2026 19	Real Madrid	5–1	Real Betis	Madrid
16:15 UTC+1	G. García 20', 50', 82'; Asencio 56'; F. García 90+3'	Report	Hernández 66'	Stadium: Bernabéu; Attendance: 75,190; Referee: Alejandro Hernández Hernández

17 January 2026 20	Real Madrid	2–0	Levante	Madrid
14:00 UTC+1	Mbappé 58' (pen.); Asencio 65'	Report		Stadium: Bernabéu; Attendance: 70,104; Referee: Miguel Sesma Espinosa

24 January 2026 21	Villarreal	0–2	Real Madrid	Villarreal
21:00 UTC+1		Report	Mbappé 47', 90+4' (pen.)	Stadium: La Cerámica; Attendance: 20,432; Referee: César Soto Grado

1 February 2026 22	Real Madrid	2–1	Rayo Vallecano	Madrid
14:00 UTC+1	Vinícius 15'; Mbappé 90+10' (pen.)	Report	De Frutos 49'; Ciss (red card) 80'; Chavarría (yellow card) 57' (yellow-red card) 90+13'	Stadium: Bernabéu; Attendance: 71,051; Referee: Isidro Díaz de Mera Escuderos

8 February 2026 23	Valencia	0–2	Real Madrid	Valencia
21:00 UTC+1		Report	Carreras 65'; Mbappé 90+1'	Stadium: Mestalla; Attendance: 47,515; Referee: Javier Alberola Rojas

14 February 2026 24	Real Madrid	4–1	Real Sociedad	Madrid
21:00 UTC+1	G. García 5'; Vinícius 25' (pen.), 48' (pen.); Valverde 31'	Report	Oyarzabal 21' (pen.)	Stadium: Bernabéu; Attendance: 74,176; Referee: Francisco Hernández Maeso

21 February 2026 25	Osasuna	2–1	Real Madrid	Pamplona
18:30 UTC+1	Budimir 38' (pen.); Ra. García 90'	Report	Vinícius 73'	Stadium: El Sadar; Attendance: 22,480; Referee: Alejandro Quintero González

2 March 2026 26	Real Madrid	0–1	Getafe	Madrid
21:00 UTC+1	Mastantuono (red card) 90+5'	Report	Satriano 39'; Liso (yellow card) 79' (yellow-red card) 90+7'	Stadium: Bernabéu; Attendance: 65,104; Referee: Alejandro Muñiz Ruiz

6 March 2026 27	Celta Vigo	1–2	Real Madrid	Vigo
21:00 UTC+1	Iglesias 25'	Report	Tchouaméni 11'; Valverde 90+4'	Stadium: ABANCA Balaídos; Attendance: 22,048; Referee: Isidro Díaz de Mera Escuderos

14 March 2026 28	Real Madrid	4–1	Elche	Madrid
21:00 UTC+1	Rüdiger 39'; Valverde 44'; Huijsen 66'; Güler 89'	Report	Ángel 85' (o.g.)	Stadium: Bernabéu; Attendance: 71,048; Referee: Jesús Gil Manzano

22 March 2026 29	Real Madrid	3–2	Atlético Madrid	Madrid
21:00 UTC+1	Vinícius 52' (pen.), 72'; Valverde 55', (red card) 77'	Report	Lookman 33'; Molina 66'	Stadium: Bernabéu; Attendance: 77,964; Referee: Juan Martínez Munuera

4 April 2026 30	Mallorca	2–1	Real Madrid	Palma
16:15 UTC+2	Morlanes 41'; Muriqi 90+1'	Report	Militão 88'	Stadium: Mallorca Son Moix; Attendance: 23,015; Referee: José María Sánchez Martínez

10 April 2026 31	Real Madrid	1–1	Girona	Madrid
21:00 UTC+2	Valverde 51'	Report	Lemar 62'	Stadium: Bernabéu; Attendance: 70,885; Referee: Javier Alberola Rojas

21 April 2026 32	Real Madrid	2–1	Alavés	Madrid
21:30 UTC+2	Mbappé 30'; Vinícius 50'	Report	Martínez 90+3'	Stadium: Bernabéu; Attendance: 61,468; Referee: Juan Martínez Munuera

24 April 2026 33	Real Betis	1–1	Real Madrid	Seville
21:00 UTC+2	Bellerín 90+4'	Report	Vinícius 17'	Stadium: La Cartuja; Attendance: 54,348; Referee: César Soto Grado

3 May 2026 34	Espanyol	0–2	Real Madrid	Cornellà de Llobregat
21:00 UTC+2		Report	Vinícius 55', 66'	Stadium: RCDE Stadium; Attendance: 31,733; Referee: Jesús Gil Manzano

10 May 2026 35	Barcelona	2–0	Real Madrid	Barcelona
21:00 UTC+2	Rashford 9'; Torres 18'	Report		Stadium: Spotify Camp Nou; Attendance: 62,213; Referee: Alejandro Hernández Hernández

14 May 2026 36	Real Madrid	2–0	Oviedo	Madrid
21:30 UTC+2	G. García 44'; Bellingham 80'	Report		Stadium: Bernabéu; Attendance: 62,774; Referee: Ricardo de Burgos Bengoetxea

17 May 2026 37	Sevilla	0–1	Real Madrid	Seville
19:00 UTC+2		Report	Vinícius 15'	Stadium: Ramón Sánchez-Pizjuán; Attendance: 40,844; Referee: José María Sánchez Martínez

23 May 2026 38	Real Madrid	4–2	Athletic Bilbao	Madrid
21:00 UTC+2	G. García 12'; Bellingham 41'; Mbappé 51'; Brahim 88'	Report	Guruzeta 45+1'; Izeta 90+1'	Stadium: Bernabéu; Attendance: 70,398; Referee: Juan Martínez Munuera

=== Copa del Rey ===
Madrid entered the tournament in the round of 32, as they had qualified for the 2026 Supercopa de España.

17 December 2025 Round of 32	Talavera de la Reina	2–3	Real Madrid	Talavera de la Reina
21:00 UTC+1	Arroyo 80'; Di Renzo 90+1'	Report	Mbappé 41' (pen.), 88'; Farrando 45+1' (o.g.)	Stadium: El Prado; Attendance: 4,200; Referee: Guillermo Cuadra Fernández

14 January 2026 Round of 16	Albacete	3–2	Real Madrid	Albacete
21:00 UTC+1	Villar 42'; Betancor 82', 90+4'	Report	Mastantuono 45+3'; G. García 90+1'	Stadium: Carlos Belmonte; Attendance: 16,800; Referee: Víctor García Verdura

=== Supercopa de España ===
8 January 2026 Semi-finals	Atlético Madrid	1–2	Real Madrid	Jeddah, Saudi Arabia
22:00 UTC+3	Sørloth 58'	Report	Valverde 2'; Rodrygo 55'	Stadium: King Abdullah Sports City; Attendance: 55,651; Referee: Mateo Busquets Ferrer

11 January 2026 Final	Barcelona	3–2	Real Madrid	Jeddah, Saudi Arabia
22:00 UTC+3	Raphinha 36', 73'; Lewandowski 45+4'; De Jong (red card) 90+1'	Report	Vinícius 45+2'; G. García 45+6'	Stadium: King Abdullah Sports City; Attendance: 60,326; Referee: José Luis Munuera Montero

=== UEFA Champions League ===
==== League phase ====
The league phase draw was held on 28 August 2025.

Pos	Team	Pld	W	D	L	GF	GA	GD	Pts	Qualification
7	(Portuguese Football Federation) Sporting CP	8	5	1	2	17	11	+6	16	Advance to round of 16 (seeded)
8	(The Football Association) Manchester City	8	5	1	2	15	9	+6	16	Advance to round of 16 (seeded)
9	(Royal Spanish Football Federation) Real Madrid	8	5	0	3	21	12	+9	15	Advance to knockout phase play-offs (seeded)
10	(Italian Football Federation) Inter Milan	8	5	0	3	15	7	+8	15	Advance to knockout phase play-offs (seeded)
11	(French Football Federation) Paris Saint-Germain	8	4	2	2	21	11	+10	14	Advance to knockout phase play-offs (seeded)

Source: UEFA
Rules for classification: League phase tiebreakers

Overall								Home						Away					
Pld	W	D	L	GF	GA	GD	Pts	W	D	L	GF	GA	GD	W	D	L	GF	GA	GD
8	5	0	3	21	12	+9	15	3	0	1	10	4	+6	2	0	2	11	8	+3

Source: UEFA

Round	1	2	3	4	5	6	7	8
Ground	H	A	H	A	A	H	H	A
Result	W	W	W	L	W	L	W	L
Position	13	2	5	7	5	7	3	9

Source: UEFA
A = Away; H = Home; W = Win; D = Draw; L = Loss

16 September 2025 1	Real Madrid (Spain)	2–1	(France) Marseille	Madrid, Spain
21:00 UTC+2	Mbappé 29' (pen.), 81' (pen.); Carvajal (red card) 72'	Report	Weah 22'	Stadium: Bernabéu; Attendance: 74,610; Referee: Irfan Peljto (Bosnia and Herzegovina)

30 September 2025 2	Kairat (Kazakhstan)	0–5	(Spain) Real Madrid	Almaty, Kazakhstan
21:45 UTC+5		Report	Mbappé 25' (pen.), 52', 73'; Camavinga 83'; Brahim 90+3'	Stadium: Central Stadium; Attendance: 22,788; Referee: Marco Guida (Italy)

22 October 2025 3	Real Madrid (Spain)	1–0	(Italy) Juventus	Madrid, Spain
21:00 UTC+2	Bellingham 57'	Report		Stadium: Bernabéu; Attendance: 76,521; Referee: Slavko Vinčić (Slovenia)

4 November 2025 4	Liverpool (England)	1–0	(Spain) Real Madrid	Liverpool, England
20:00 UTC+0	Mac Allister 61'	Report		Stadium: Anfield; Attendance: 59,916; Referee: István Kovács (Romania)

26 November 2025 5	Olympiacos (Greece)	3–4	(Spain) Real Madrid	Piraeus, Greece
22:00 UTC+2	Chiquinho 8'; Taremi 52'; El Kaabi 81'	Report	Mbappé 22', 24', 29', 60'	Stadium: Karaiskakis Stadium; Attendance: 32,325; Referee: Michael Oliver (England)

10 December 2025 6	Real Madrid (Spain)	1–2	(England) Manchester City	Madrid, Spain
21:00 UTC+1	Rodrygo 28'	Report	O'Reilly 35'; Haaland 43' (pen.)	Stadium: Bernabéu; Attendance: 76,977; Referee: Clément Turpin (France)

20 January 2026 7	Real Madrid (Spain)	6–1	(France) Monaco	Madrid, Spain
21:00 UTC+1	Mbappé 5', 26'; Mastantuono 51'; Kehrer 55' (o.g.); Vinícius 63'; Bellingham 80'	Report	Teze 72'	Stadium: Bernabéu; Attendance: 73,599; Referee: Espen Eskås (Norway)

28 January 2026 8	Benfica (Portugal)	4–2	(Spain) Real Madrid	Lisbon, Portugal
20:00 UTC+0	Schjelderup 36', 54'; Pavlidis 45+5' (pen.); Trubin 90+8'	Report	Mbappé 30', 58'; Asencio (yellow card) 45+4' (yellow-red card) 90+2'; Rodrygo (yellow card) 90+6' (red card) 90+6'	Stadium: Estádio da Luz; Attendance: 64,305; Referee: Davide Massa (Italy)

==== Knockout phase ====
===== Knockout phase play-offs =====
The knockout phase play-off draw was held on 30 January 2026.

17 February 2026 First leg	Benfica (Portugal)	0–1	(Spain) Real Madrid	Lisbon, Portugal
20:00 UTC+0		Report	Vinícius 50'	Stadium: Estádio da Luz; Attendance: 66,387; Referee: François Letexier (France)

25 February 2026 Second leg	Real Madrid (Spain)	2–1 (3–1 agg.)	(Portugal) Benfica	Madrid, Spain
21:00 UTC+1	Tchouaméni 16'; Vinícius 80'	Report	R. Silva 14'	Stadium: Bernabéu; Attendance: 76,745; Referee: Slavko Vinčić (Slovenia)

===== Round of 16 =====
The round of 16 draw was held on 27 February 2026.

11 March 2026 First leg	Real Madrid (Spain)	3–0	(England) Manchester City	Madrid, Spain
21:00 UTC+1	Valverde 20', 27', 42'	Report		Stadium: Bernabéu; Attendance: 76,066; Referee: Maurizio Mariani (Italy)

17 March 2026 Second leg	Manchester City (England)	1–2 (1–5 agg.)	(Spain) Real Madrid	Manchester, England
20:00 UTC+0	Silva (red card) 20'; Haaland 41'	Report	Vinícius 22' (pen.), 90+3'	Stadium: City of Manchester Stadium; Attendance: 51,103; Referee: Clément Turpin (France)

===== Quarter-finals =====
The quarter-finals draw was held on 27 February 2026, after the round of 16 draw.

7 April 2026 First leg	Real Madrid (Spain)	1–2	(Germany) Bayern Munich	Madrid, Spain
21:00 UTC+2	Mbappé 74'	Report	Díaz 41'; Kane 46'	Stadium: Bernabéu; Attendance: 77,106; Referee: Michael Oliver (England)

15 April 2026 Second leg	Bayern Munich (Germany)	4–3 (6–4 agg.)	(Spain) Real Madrid	Munich, Germany
21:00 UTC+2	Pavlović 6'; Kane 38'; Díaz 89'; Olise 90+4'	Report	Güler 1', 29', (yellow card) 90+5' (yellow-red card) 90+5'; Mbappé 42'; Camavinga (yellow card) 78' (yellow-red card) 86'	Stadium: Allianz Arena; Attendance: 75,000; Referee: Slavko Vinčić (Slovenia)

== Statistics ==
=== Squad statistics ===
No.	Pos	Nat	Player	Total		La Liga		Copa del Rey		Champions League		Supercopa de España	
No.	Pos	Nat	Player	Apps	Goals	Apps	Goals	Apps	Goals	Apps	Goals	Apps	Goals
1	GK	(Belgium)	Thibaut Courtois	45	0	32	0	0	0	11	0	2	0
2	DF	(Spain)	Dani Carvajal	23	0	17	0	1	0	5	0	0	0
3	DF	(Brazil)	Éder Militão	21	2	16	2	0	0	5	0	0	0
4	DF	(Austria)	David Alaba	16	0	11	0	1	0	3	0	1	0
5	MF	(England)	Jude Bellingham	40	8	28	6	1	0	9	2	2	0
6	MF	(France)	Eduardo Camavinga	43	2	29	1	1	0	11	1	2	0
7	FW	(Brazil)	Vinícius Júnior	53	22	36	16	1	0	14	5	2	1
8	MF	(Uruguay)	Federico Valverde	49	9	33	5	1	0	13	3	2	1
9	FW	(Brazil)	Endrick †	3	0	1	0	1	0	1	0	0	0
10	FW	(France)	Kylian Mbappé	44	42	31	25	1	2	11	15	1	0
11	FW	(Brazil)	Rodrygo	27	3	19	1	1	0	5	1	2	1
12	DF	(England)	Trent Alexander-Arnold	30	0	21	0	0	0	9	0	0	0
13	GK	(Ukraine)	Andriy Lunin	12	0	6	0	2	0	4	0	0	0
14	MF	(France)	Aurélien Tchouaméni	49	2	33	1	1	0	13	1	2	0
15	MF	(Turkey)	Arda Güler	51	6	33	4	2	0	14	2	2	0
16	FW	(Spain)	Gonzalo García	39	8	30	6	2	1	5	0	2	1
17	DF	(Spain)	Raúl Asencio	34	2	23	2	1	0	8	0	2	0
18	DF	(Spain)	Álvaro Carreras	40	2	28	2	1	0	9	0	2	0
19	MF	(Spain)	Dani Ceballos	23	0	16	0	1	0	4	0	2	0
20	DF	(Spain)	Fran García	23	1	13	1	2	0	7	0	1	0
21	FW	(Morocco)	Brahim Díaz	42	2	30	1	0	0	12	1	0	0
22	DF	(Germany)	Antonio Rüdiger	26	1	18	1	0	0	7	0	1	0
23	DF	(France)	Ferland Mendy	9	0	5	0	0	0	3	0	1	0
24	DF	(Spain)	Dean Huijsen	40	2	28	2	2	0	9	0	1	0
27	DF	(Spain)	Diego Aguado	1	0	1	0	0	0	0	0	0	0
28	MF	(Spain)	Jorge Cestero	5	0	2	0	2	0	1	0	0	0
30	FW	(Argentina)	Franco Mastantuono	35	3	23	1	2	1	8	1	2	0
35	DF	(Spain)	David Jiménez	4	0	2	0	2	0	0	0	0	0
37	MF	(Spain)	Manuel Ángel	7	0	4	0	1	0	2	0	0	0
38	MF	(Spain)	César Palacios	7	0	5	0	1	0	1	0	0	0
40	DF	(Spain)	Víctor Valdepeñas	1	0	1	0	0	0	0	0	0	0
42	FW	(Spain)	Daniel Yáñez	2	0	2	0	0	0	0	0	0	0
45	MF	(Spain)	Thiago Pitarch	16	0	10	0	0	0	6	0	0	0
46	MF	(Spain)	Álvaro Leiva	1	0	1	0	0	0	0	0	0	0
47	MF	(Spain)	Daniel Mesonero	1	0	0	0	0	0	1	0	0	0
51	DF	(Spain)	Manu Serrano	1	0	1	0	0	0	0	0	0	0

Source: FBREF

^{†} Player left Madrid during the season.

=== Goals ===
Rank	Player	La Liga	CdR	UCL	Supercopa	Total
1	(France) Kylian Mbappé	25	2	15	0	42
2	(Brazil) Vinícius Júnior	16	0	5	1	22
3	(Uruguay) Federico Valverde	5	0	3	1	9
4	(England) Jude Bellingham	6	0	2	0	8
4	(Spain) Gonzalo García	6	1	0	1	8
6	(Turkey) Arda Güler	4	0	2	0	6
7	(Argentina) Franco Mastantuono	1	1	1	0	3
7	(Brazil) Rodrygo	1	0	1	1	3
9	(Spain) Raúl Asencio	2	0	0	0	2
9	(France) Eduardo Camavinga	1	0	1	0	2
9	(Spain) Álvaro Carreras	2	0	0	0	2
9	(Spain) Dean Huijsen	2	0	0	0	2
9	(Brazil) Éder Militão	2	0	0	0	2
9	(France) Aurélien Tchouaméni	1	0	1	0	2
9	(Morocco) Brahim Díaz	1	0	1	0	2
16	(Spain) Fran García	1	0	0	0	1
16	(Germany) Antonio Rüdiger	1	0	0	0	1
Own goals		0	1	1	0	2
Total		77	5	33	4	119

Source: FBREF

=== Clean sheets ===
Rank	Player	La Liga	CdR	UCL	Supercopa	Total
1	(Belgium) Thibaut Courtois	13	0	4	0	17
2	(Ukraine) Andriy Lunin	1	0	0	0	1
Total		14	0	4	0	18

Source: FBREF

=== Disciplinary record ===
N	P	Nat.	Name	La Liga			CdR			UCL			Supercopa			Total			Notes
N	P	Nat.	Name	Yellow card	Second yellow card	Red card	Yellow card	Second yellow card	Red card	Yellow card	Second yellow card	Red card	Yellow card	Second yellow card	Red card	Yellow card	Second yellow card	Red card	Notes
18	DF	(Spain)	Álvaro Carreras	5		1				4			1			10		1	
24	DF	(Spain)	Dean Huijsen	7		1	1			2						10		1	
11	MF	(Brazil)	Rodrygo	3						2		1				5		1	
30	FW	(Argentina)	Franco Mastantuono	5		1										5		1	
8	MF	(Uruguay)	Federico Valverde	3		1							1			4		1	
2	DF	(Spain)	Dani Carvajal									1						1	
9	FW	(Brazil)	Endrick			1												1	
13	GK	(Ukraine)	Andriy Lunin			1												1	
17	DF	(Spain)	Raúl Asencio	4			1			1	1		1			7	1		
6	MF	(France)	Eduardo Camavinga	2						1	1					3	1		
15	MF	(Turkey)	Arda Güler	1						1	1					2	1		
20	DF	(Spain)	Fran García		1												1		
7	FW	(Brazil)	Vinícius Júnior	8						2			1			11			
14	MF	(France)	Aurélien Tchouaméni	8						3						11			
5	MF	(England)	Jude Bellingham	3			1			2						6			
10	FW	(France)	Kylian Mbappé	4						2						6			
3	DF	(Brazil)	Éder Militão	2						2						4			
12	DF	(England)	Trent Alexander-Arnold	3						1						4			
21	FW	(Morocco)	Brahim Díaz	2						1						3			
16	FW	(Spain)	Gonzalo García	2												2			
22	DF	(Germany)	Antonio Rüdiger							2						2			
45	MF	(Spain)	Thiago Pitarch	2												2			
1	GK	(Belgium)	Thibaut Courtois	1												1			
4	DF	(Austria)	David Alaba	1												1			
19	MF	(Spain)	Dani Ceballos	1												1			
38	MF	(Spain)	César Palacios							1						1			

Source: FBREF
Ordered by (red card) , (second yellow card) and (yellow card)
(yellow card) = Number of bookings; (second yellow card) = Number of sending offs after a second yellow card; (red card) = Number of sending offs by a direct red card.

== Awards ==
=== Monthly awards ===
==== La Liga awards ====
Award	Month	Player / Coach	Ref.
Coach of the Month	August	(Spain) Xabi Alonso	
Player of the Month	September	(France) Kylian Mbappé	
U23 Player of the Month	September	(Turkey) Arda Güler	
Goal of the Month	September	(Brazil) Éder Militão	
Player of the Month	October	(France) Kylian Mbappé	
Goal of the Month	January	(Spain) Gonzalo García	
Goal of the Month	March	(Turkey) Arda Güler	

==== Mahou awards ====
Award	Month	Player	Ref.
Player of the Month	August	(France) Kylian Mbappé	
Player of the Month	September	(France) Kylian Mbappé	
Player of the Month	October	(Turkey) Arda Güler	
Player of the Month	November	(France) Kylian Mbappé	
Player of the Month	December	(Belgium) Thibaut Courtois	
Player of the Month	January	(France) Kylian Mbappé	
Player of the Month	February	(Uruguay) Federico Valverde	
Player of the Month	April	(Turkey) Arda Güler	

=== Annual Awards ===
Award	Player(s) / Coach	Ref.
UEFA Champions League Revelation of the Season	(Turkey) Arda Güler	
UEFA Champions League Goal of the Season	(Uruguay) Federico Valverde	
La Liga Goal of the Season	(Turkey) Arda Güler	
Mahou Player of the Season	(France) Kylian Mbappé	
FIFPRO Men's World 11	(England) Jude Bellingham (France) Kylian Mbappé	
La Liga Team of the Season	(Belgium) Thibaut Courtois (Turkey) Arda Güler (France) Kylian Mbappé (France) Aurélien Tchouaméni (Uruguay) Federico Valverde	
