= Alieu Njie (footballer, born 2005) =

Swedish footballer (born 2005)

Personal information
- Full name: Alieu Badara Njie
- Date of birth: 14 May 2005 (age 21)
- Place of birth: Borlänge, Sweden
- Height: 1.85 m (6 ft 1 in)
- Position: Winger

Team information
- Current team: Fiorentina (on loan from Torino)
- Number: 25

Youth career
- Kvarnsvedens IK
- IK Brage
- Dalkurd
- –2021: Forssa BK
- 2021–2024: Torino

Senior career*
Years	Team	Apps	(Gls)
2024–	Torino	32	(2)
2026–	→ Fiorentina (loan)	9	(3)

International career^{‡}
2023–2024	Sweden U19	8	(0)
2025–2026	Sweden U21	8	(1)
2026–	Sweden	1	(0)
- * Club domestic league appearances and goals as of 23:06, 8 November 2026 (UTC) ‡ National team caps and goals as of 23:51, 17 November 2026 (UTC)

Alieu "Eybie" Badara Njie (/aˈliːu ɲɟaːj/ ah-LEE-oo NYAI; born 14 May 2005) is a Swedish footballer who plays as a winger for Serie A club Fiorentina, on loan from Torino and the Sweden national team.

== Early career ==
Njie was born on 14 May 2005 in Borlänge, Sweden where he grew up with a single mother. As a youth player, he joined Forssa BK.

=== Torino ===
In 2021, he joined the youth academy of Serie A side Torino. He started with their under-17 team before being promoted to their under-21 team in 2022. In 2023, he signed a professional contract with them. He started his senior career with the club. On 20 September 2024, he debuted for the club during a 3–2 win over Verona.

==== Loan to Fiorentina ====
On 30 August 2026, Njie joined Fiorentina on an initial loan with an obligation to buy for €16 million if certain conditions are met.

== International career ==
Njie is a Sweden youth international. He has played for the Sweden national under-19 football team and Sweden national under-21 football team. He made six appearances and scored zero goals while playing for the Sweden national under-19 football team.

Njie was one of the 25 players who were called up for the Sweden national team by head coach Graham Potter for the 2026–27 UEFA Nations League matches against Bosnia and Herzegovina and Poland on 14 and 17 November 2026, respectively.

== Career statistics ==
As of match played 8 November 2026

Appearances and goals by club, season and competition
Club	Season	League			Cup		Europe		Other		Total	
Club	Season	Division	Apps	Goals	Apps	Goals	Apps	Goals	Apps	Goals	Apps	Goals
Torino	2024–25	Serie A	16	1	1	0	—		—		17	1
Torino	2025–26	Serie A	15	1	3	0	—		—		18	1
Torino	2026–27	Serie A	1	0	0	0	—		—		1	0
Torino	Total		32	2	4	0	—		—		36	2
Fiorentina (loan)	2026–27	Serie A	9	3	1	0	—		—		10	3
Career total			41	5	5	0	0	0	0	0	46	5

=== International ===
As of match played 17 November 2026

Appearances and goals by national team and year
National team	Year	Apps	Goals
Sweden	2026	1	0
Total		1	0
