= Jorge Cestero =

Spanish footballer (born 2006)

Personal information
- Full name: Jorge Cestero Sancho
- Date of birth: 24 March 2006 (age 20)
- Place of birth: Zaragoza, Spain
- Height: 1.78 m (5 ft 10 in)
- Position: Midfielder

Team information
- Current team: Real Madrid B
- Number: 6

Youth career
- 2014–2016: La Unión
- 2016–2019: Zaragoza
- 2019–2025: Real Madrid

Senior career*
Years	Team	Apps	(Gls)
2024–2025	Real Madrid C	1	(0)
2025–	Real Madrid B	31	(2)
2026–	Real Madrid	2	(0)
- * Club domestic league appearances and goals as of 06:41, 8 September 2026 (UTC)

Jorge Cestero Sancho (born 24 March 2006) is a Spanish professional footballer who plays as a midfielder for Primera Federación club Real Madrid B.

== Club career ==
As a youth player, Cestero joined the youth academy of Zaragoza. Following his stint there, he joined the youth academy of La Liga side Real Madrid and was promoted to the club's reserve team ahead of the 2025–26 season.

Cestero made his debut with the senior team during the round of 32 Copa del Rey match against CF Talavera de la Reina. He came off the bench in the 86th minute to replace Dani Ceballos. He debuted with the senior Real Madrid as a substitute in a 4–2 UEFA Champions League loss to Benfica on 28 January 2026.

== Style of play ==
Cestero plays as a midfielder and is right-footed. Spanish newspaper El Cierre Digital wrote in 2025 that "his ability to organize and direct the team, combined with his 1.81m height, are qualities".

== Career statistics ==
As of match played 8 September 2026

Appearances and goals by club, season and competition
Club	Season	League			Copa del Rey		Europe		Other		Total	
Club	Season	Division	Apps	Goals	Apps	Goals	Apps	Goals	Apps	Goals	Apps	Goals
Real Madrid C	2024–25	Segunda Federación	1	0	—		—		—		1	0
Real Madrid B	2025–26	Primera Federación	31	2	—		—		—		31	2
Real Madrid	2025–26	La Liga	2	0	2	0	1 (Note: Appearance in UEFA Champions League)	0	0	0	5	0
Career total			34	2	2	0	1	0	0	0	37	2
