= List of Real Madrid CF records and statistics =

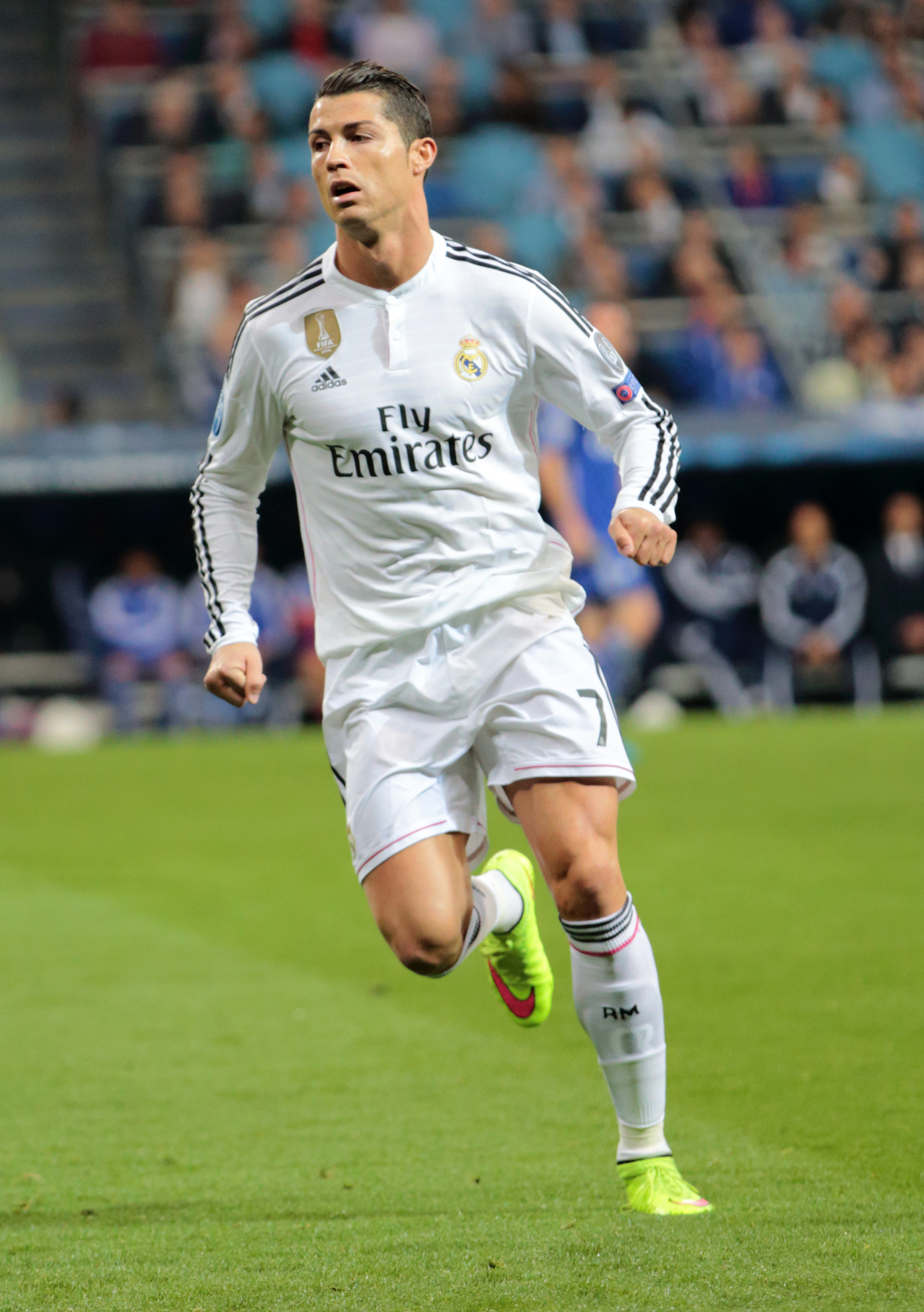
Cristiano Ronaldo is Real Madrid's all-time leading goalscorer with 450 goals in 438 games in total.

Real Madrid Club de Fútbol is a Spanish professional association football club based in Madrid. The club was formed in 1902 as Madrid Football Club, and played its first competitive match on 13 May 1902, in the Copa de la Coronación semi-final. Real Madrid currently plays in the Spanish top-tier La Liga, having become one of the founding members of that league in 1929, and is one of three clubs, the others being Barcelona and Athletic Bilbao, to have never been relegated from the league. They have also been involved in European football ever since they became the first Spanish club to enter the European Cup in 1955, except for the 1977–78 and 1996–97 seasons.

This list encompasses the major honours won by Real Madrid and records set by the club, their managers and their players. The player records section includes details of the club's leading goalscorers and those who have made most appearances in first team competitions. It also records notable achievements by Real Madrid players on the international stage, and the highest transfer fees paid and received by the club.

The club currently holds the record for the most European Cup / UEFA Champions League triumphs, with 15, and the most La Liga titles, with 36. Additionally, Real has won the Copa del Rey 20 times, the Supercopa de España 13 times, the Copa de la Liga once, the Copa Eva Duarte once, the UEFA Cup twice, the European/UEFA Super Cup six times, the Intercontinental Cup three times, the FIFA Intercontinental Cup one time, the FIFA Club World Cup five times, the Latin Cup twice and Copa Iberoamericana once. Powered by its fifteen European Cups, Real Madrid have a distinction of being the most successful club in terms of international titles, having amassed 35 pieces of silverware, more than any other team in the world. On the domestic front, its 71 titles rank second to Barcelona. The club's record appearance maker is Raúl, who made 741 appearances from 1994 to 2010; the club's record goalscorer is Portuguese forward Cristiano Ronaldo, who scored 450 goals in 438 appearances through all competitions from 2009 to 2018.

== Players ==
=== Appearances ===
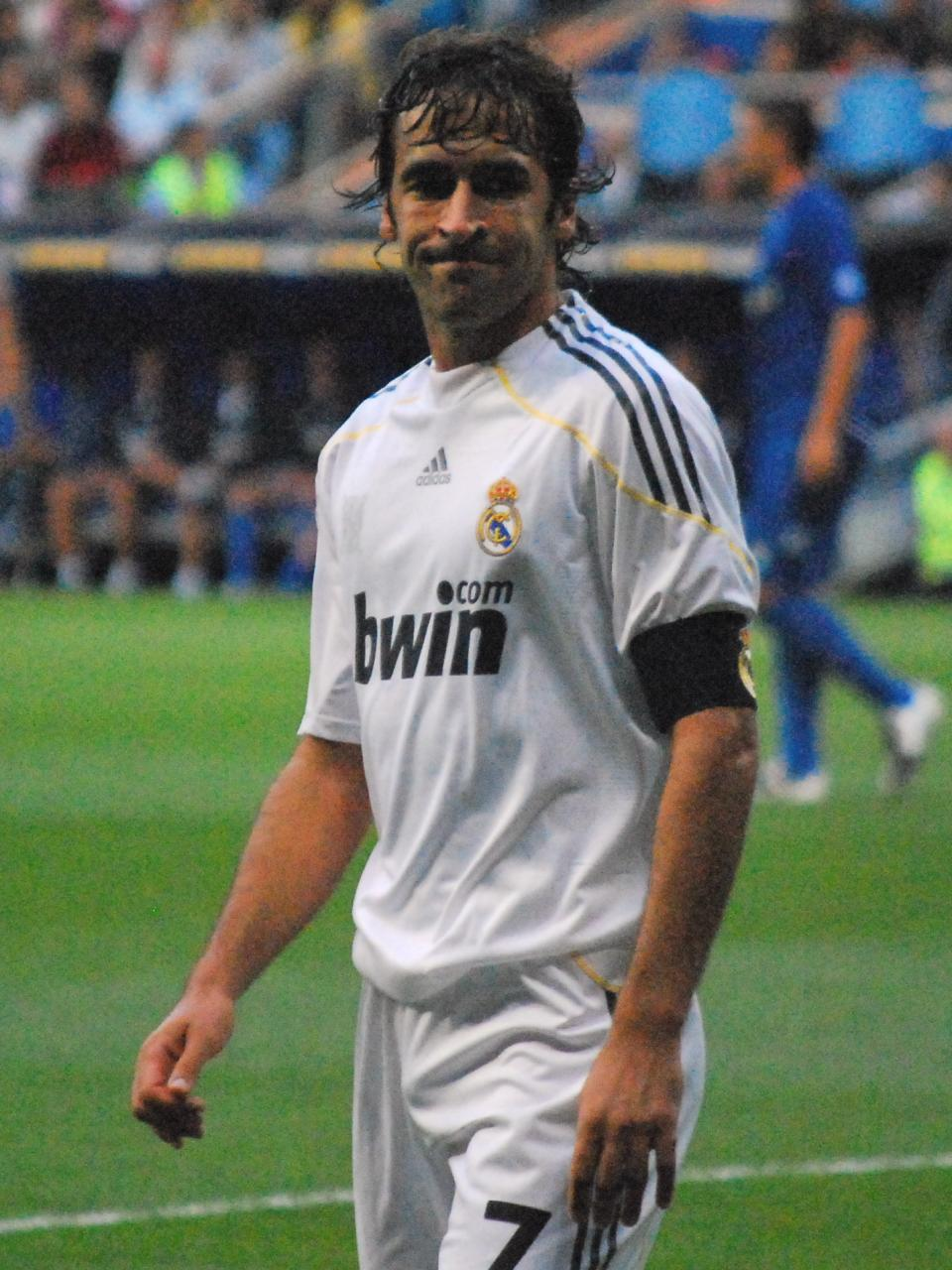
Raúl, the most-capped player in Real Madrid's history.

==== Most appearances ====
Competitive, professional matches only. Including substitutes. Players in italics are still active outside the club. As of 9 July 2025.

Rank	Player	Years	League	Cup	Europe (Note: The "Europe" column includes goals and appearances in the European Cup / UEFA Champions League, European / UEFA Cup Winners' Cup, and UEFA Cup / Europa League.)	Other (Note: The "Other" column includes goals and appearances in the Supercopa de España, Copa de la Liga, European / UEFA Super Cup, Intercontinental Cup, Copa Iberoamericana, Latin Cup and FIFA Club World Championship / Club World Cup.)	Total
1	(Spain) Raúl	1994–2010	550	37	132	22	741
2	(Spain) Iker Casillas	1999–2015	510	40	152	23	725
3	(Spain) Manolo Sanchís	1983–2001	523	67	99	21	710
4	(Spain) Sergio Ramos	2005–2021	469	48	129	25	671
5	(France) Karim Benzema	2009–2023	439	49	133	27	648
6	(Spain) Santillana	1971–1988	461	84	87	13	645
7	(Spain) Fernando Hierro	1989–2003	439	43	101	19	602
8	(Spain) Paco Gento	1953–1971	427	73	94	6	600
9	(Croatia) Luka Modrić	2012–2025	394	34	134	35	597
10	(Spain) José Camacho	1973–1989	414	61	90	12	577

==== By competition ====
- Most appearances in La Liga: 550 – (Spain) Raúl
- Most appearances in Copa del Rey: 84 – (Spain) Santillana
- Most appearances in Copa de la Liga: 13 – (Spain) Isidoro San José
- Most appearances in Supercopa de España: 15 – (Spain) Sergio Ramos
- Most appearances in international competitions: 162 – (Spain) Iker Casillas
- Most appearances in UEFA club competitions: 157 – (Spain) Iker Casillas
- Most appearances in European competitions: 155 – (Spain) Iker Casillas
- Most appearances in UEFA Champions League: 152 – (Spain) Iker Casillas
- Most appearances in European Cup Winners' Cup: 16 – (Spain) Goyo Benito
- Most appearances in UEFA Cup: 44 – (Spain) Míchel
- Most appearances in UEFA Super Cup: 6
  - (Spain) Dani Carvajal
  - (Croatia) Luka Modrić
- Most appearances in Intercontinental Cup: 3
  - (Spain) Pachín
  - (Spain) Fernando Hierro
  - (Spain) Raúl
  - (Brazil) Roberto Carlos
- Most appearances in FIFA Club World Cup: 14 – (Croatia) Luka Modrić
- Most appearances in FIFA Intercontinental Cup: 1 – 16 players

==== Oldest and youngest ====
- Youngest player: 16 years, 157 days – (Norway) Martin Ødegaard v Getafe, 2014–15 La Liga, 23 May 2015
- Youngest player, including regional competitions: 15 years, 38 days – (France) René Petit v Sociedad Gimnástica, Campeonato Regional Centro, 15 November 1914
- Youngest player, including friendly matches: 12 years, 272 days – (Spain) José Gandarias v Deportivo Auténtico, Friendly match, 17 December 1916
- Oldest player: 39 years, 303 days – (Croatia) Luka Modrić v Paris Saint-Germain, 2025 FIFA Club World Cup, 9 July 2025
- Oldest debutant: 34 years, 271 days – (Poland) Jerzy Dudek v Alicante, 2007–08 Copa del Rey, 19 December 2007
- Oldest outfield debutant: 34 years, 130 days – (Spain) José González López v Real Sociedad, 1951–52 La Liga, 17 February 1952
- Largest age difference between two players in the same match: 21 years, 200 days – Luka Modrić and Daniel Yáñez v Girona, 2024–25 La Liga, 7 December 2024

==== Relatives ====
Note: It is required that players have participated in at least one official match in order to be included in the following lists. Appearances in friendly or regional tournaments are not counted, nor are players who joined Real Madrid without making any appearance.

- Fathers and sons who played for Real Madrid:
  - (Spain) Manuel Sanchís (1965–1971) and his son Manolo Sanchís (1983–2001)
  - (Spain) Isidro Sánchez (1961–1965) and his son Quique Sánchez Flores (1994–1996)
  - (Spain) Miguel Pérez (1967–1971) and his son Álex Pérez (2004–2005)
  - (Spain) Paco Llorente (1987–1994) and his son Marcos Llorente (2015–2019)
  - (France) Zinedine Zidane (2001–2006) and his sons Enzo Zidane (2016–2017) and Luca Zidane (2017–2019)
- Brothers who played for Real Madrid:
  - (Cuba) Mario Giralt (1900–1903), Armando Giralt (1900–1907) and José Giralt (1900–1907)
  - (Spain) Joaquín Yarza (1904–1907) and Manuel Yarza (1904–1908)
  - (Spain) Francisco Guzmán (1909–1911), Luis Guzmán (1909–1911) and José Guzmán (1909–1911)
  - (Argentina) Sotero Aranguren (1912–1917) and Eulogio Aranguren (1915–1918)
  - (Spain) Santiago Bernabéu (1911–1926) and Marcelo Bernabéu (1910–1915)
  - (Spain) (France) René Petit (1914–1917) and Juan Petit (1914–1917)
  - (Spain) Manuel Cominges (1917–1920) and Francisco Cominges (1925–1930)
  - (Spain) Luis Regueiro (1931–1936) and Pedro Regueiro (1932–1936)
  - (Spain) Antonio Alsúa (1940–1948) and Rafael Alsúa (1943–1944)
  - (Spain) Joaquín Navarro (1949–1957) and Alfonso Navarro (1950–1951)
  - (Spain) Juanito Alonso (1949–1960) and Gabriel Alonso (1950–1954)
  - (Spain) Ángel Atienza (1954–1959) and Adolfo Atienza (1953–1955)
  - (Spain) Paco Gento (1953–1971) and Antonio Gento (1961–1962)
  - (Spain) Paco Llorente (1987–1994) and Julio Llorente (1988–1990)
  - (Spain) Alfonso Pérez (1990–1995) and Iván Pérez (1995–1996)
  - (Spain) Nacho Fernández (2010–2024) and Álex Fernández (2010–2013)
  - (France) Enzo Zidane (2016–2017) and Luca Zidane (2017–2019)
- Grandfathers and grandsons played for Real Madrid:
  - (Spain) Marquitos (1954–1962) and his grandson Marcos Alonso (2009–2010)
  - (Spain) Ramón Grosso (1964–1976) and his grandson Marcos Llorente (2015–2019)

==== Others ====
- Most number of seasons: 18
  - (Spain) Paco Gento, 1953–1971
  - (Spain) Miguel Ángel, 1968–1986 (Note: He did not play any game in his first nor his last season in the club.)
  - (Spain) Manolo Sanchís, 1983–2001
- Most minutes in a season: 5,557 – (Uruguay) Federico Valverde, 2024–25
- Most appearances in a season: 65 – (Uruguay) Federico Valverde, 2024–25
- Most appearances as a starter in a season: 62 – (Uruguay) Federico Valverde, 2024–25
- Most appearances for foreign player: 648 – (France) Karim Benzema, 2009–2023
- Most appearances as a substitute: 207 – (Spain) Guti, 1995–2010
- Most consecutive appearances as a substitute: 17 – (Argentina) Santiago Solari, 23 March 2003 – 27 September 2003
- Most appearances as substituted: 298 – (France) Karim Benzema, 2009–2023
- Most consecutive appearances: 105 – (Spain) Paco Buyo, 31 August 1986 – 10 April 1988
- Most consecutive appearances in La Liga: 171 – (Argentina) (Colombia) (Spain) Alfredo Di Stéfano, 27 September 1953 – 22 February 1959
- Longest time between consecutive games by a player: 11 years, 235 days – (Spain) Joselu, 20 December 2011 – 12 August 2023

=== Goalscorers ===
==== Most goals ====
Competitive, professional matches only. Total appearances are shown in parentheses. Players in italics are still active outside the club. As of 4 June 2023.

Rank	Player	Years	League	Cup	Europe	Other	Total	Ratio
1	(Portugal) Cristiano Ronaldo	2009–2018	311 (292)	22 (30)	105 (101)	12 (15)	450 (438)	1.03
2	(France) Karim Benzema	2009–2023	238 (439)	25 (49)	78 (133)	13 (27)	354 (648)	0.55
3	(Spain) Raúl	1994–2010	228 (550)	18 (37)	66 (132)	11 (22)	323 (741)	0.44
4	(Argentina) (Colombia) (Spain) Alfredo Di Stéfano	1953–1964	216 (282)	40 (50)	49 (58)	3 (6)	308 (396)	0.78
5	(Spain) Santillana	1971–1988	186 (461)	49 (84)	47 (87)	8 (13)	290 (645)	0.45
6	(Hungary) (Spain) Ferenc Puskás	1958–1966	156 (180)	49 (41)	35 (39)	2 (2)	242 (262)	0.92
7	(Mexico) Hugo Sánchez	1985–1992	164 (207)	19 (32)	23 (39)	2 (4)	208 (282)	0.74
8	(Spain) Paco Gento	1952–1971	127 (427)	21 (73)	31 (94)	4 (6)	183 (600)	0.31
9	(Spain) Pirri	1964–1980	123 (417)	25 (67)	23 (75)	0 (2)	171 (561)	0.3
10	(Spain) Emilio Butragueño	1983–1995	123 (341)	15 (39)	27 (75)	5 (8)	170 (463)	0.37

==== By competition ====
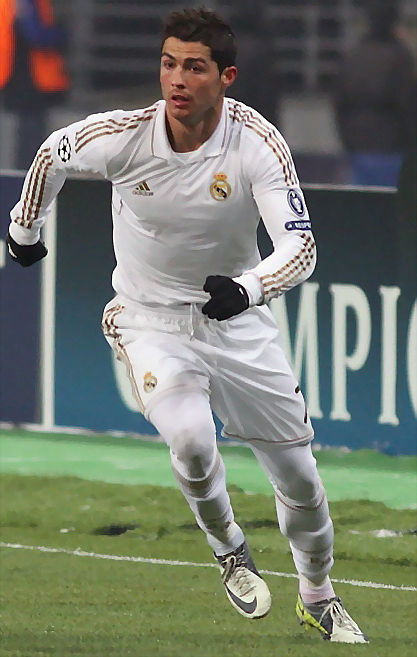
Cristiano Ronaldo, Real Madrid's all-time record goalscorer

- Most goals scored in all competitions: 450 – (Portugal) Cristiano Ronaldo, 2009–2018
- Most goals scored in La Liga: 311 – (Portugal) Cristiano Ronaldo, 2009–2018
- Most goals scored in Copa del Rey: 49
  - (Hungary) (Spain) Ferenc Puskás, 1958–1966
  - (Spain) Santillana, 1971–1988
- Most goals scored in Copa de la Liga: 8 – (Spain) Santillana, 1971–1988
- Most goals scored in Supercopa de España: 7
  - (Spain) Raúl, 1994–2010
  - (France) Karim Benzema, 2009–2023
- Most goals scored in international competitions: 113 – (Portugal) Cristiano Ronaldo, 2009–2018
- Most goals scored in European competitions: 107 – (Portugal) Cristiano Ronaldo, 2009–2018
- Most goals scored in European Cup / UEFA Champions League: 105 – (Portugal) Cristiano Ronaldo, 2009–2018
- Most goals scored in European Cup Winners' Cup: 11 – (Spain) Santillana, 1971–1988
- Most goals scored in UEFA Cup: 15 – (Spain) Santillana, 1971–1988
- Most goals scored in UEFA Super Cup: 2
  - (Portugal) Cristiano Ronaldo, 2009–2018
  - (Spain) Sergio Ramos, 2005–2021
  - (France) Karim Benzema, 2009–2023
- Most goals scored in Intercontinental Cup: 2 – (Hungary) (Spain) Ferenc Puskás, 1958–1966
- Most goals scored in FIFA Club World Cup: 6
  - (Portugal) Cristiano Ronaldo, 2009–2018
  - (Wales) Gareth Bale, 2013–2022
- Most goals scored in FIFA Intercontinental Cup: 1
  - (France) Kylian Mbappé, 2024–
  - (Brazil) Rodrygo, 2019–
  - (Brazil) Vinícius Júnior, 2018–

==== In a single season ====
This table lists players who have scored more than 40 goals in a single season. Ordered by goals scored and by season.

Rank	Player	Goals	Season	League	Domestic Cups	(Inter)continental
1	(Portugal) Cristiano Ronaldo	61	2014–15	48	1	12
2	(Portugal) Cristiano Ronaldo	60	2011–12	46	4	10
3	(Portugal) Cristiano Ronaldo	55	2012–13	34	9	12
4	(Portugal) Cristiano Ronaldo	53	2010–11	40	7	6
5	(Portugal) Cristiano Ronaldo	51	2013–14	31	3	17
5	(Portugal) Cristiano Ronaldo	51	2015–16	35	0	16
7	(Hungary) (Spain) Ferenc Puskás	47	1959–60	25	10	12
8	(Hungary) (Spain) Ferenc Puskás	44	1960–61	28	14	2
8	(Portugal) Cristiano Ronaldo	44	2017–18	26	1	17
8	(France) Karim Benzema	44	2021–22	27	2	15
8	(France) Kylian Mbappé	44	2024–25	31	3	10
12	(Argentina) (Colombia) (Spain) Alfredo Di Stéfano	43	1956–57	31	3	9
12	(Mexico) Hugo Sánchez	43	1986–87	34	6	3
14	(Mexico) Hugo Sánchez	42	1989–90	38	3	1
14	(Portugal) Cristiano Ronaldo	42	2016–17	25	1	16
14	(France) Kylian Mbappé	42	2025–26	25	2	15
17	(Hungary) (Spain) Ferenc Puskás	40	1961–62	20	13	7

- Best goal ratio in a single season: 1.305 – (Hungary) (Spain) Ferenc Puskás, 1959–60

===== In a single season by competition =====
- Most goals scored in a season in all competitions: 61 – (Portugal) Cristiano Ronaldo, 2014–15
- Most goals scored in a single La Liga season: 48 – (Portugal) Cristiano Ronaldo, 2014–15
- Most goals scored in a single Copa del Rey season: 14 – (Hungary) (Spain) Ferenc Puskás, 1960–61
- Most goals scored in a single Copa de la Liga season: 5 – (Spain) Santillana, 1983
- Most goals scored in a single European Cup / UEFA Champions League season: 17 – (Portugal) Cristiano Ronaldo, 2013–14 ^{(Record)}
  - Most goals scored in a single UEFA Champions League group stage / League phase: 13 – (France) Kylian Mbappé, 2025–26 ^{(Record)}
  - Most goals scored in a single European Cup / UEFA Champions League knockout stage: 10
    - (Portugal) Cristiano Ronaldo, 2016–17
    - (France) Karim Benzema, 2021–22
- Most goals scored in a single UEFA Cup season: 7 – (Argentina) Jorge Valdano, 1985–86
- Most goals scored in a single European Cup Winners' Cup season: 8 – (Spain) Santillana, 1982–83
- Most goals scored in a single FIFA Club World Cup season: 4
  - (Portugal) Cristiano Ronaldo, 2016
  - (Spain) Gonzalo García, 2025

==== In a single match ====
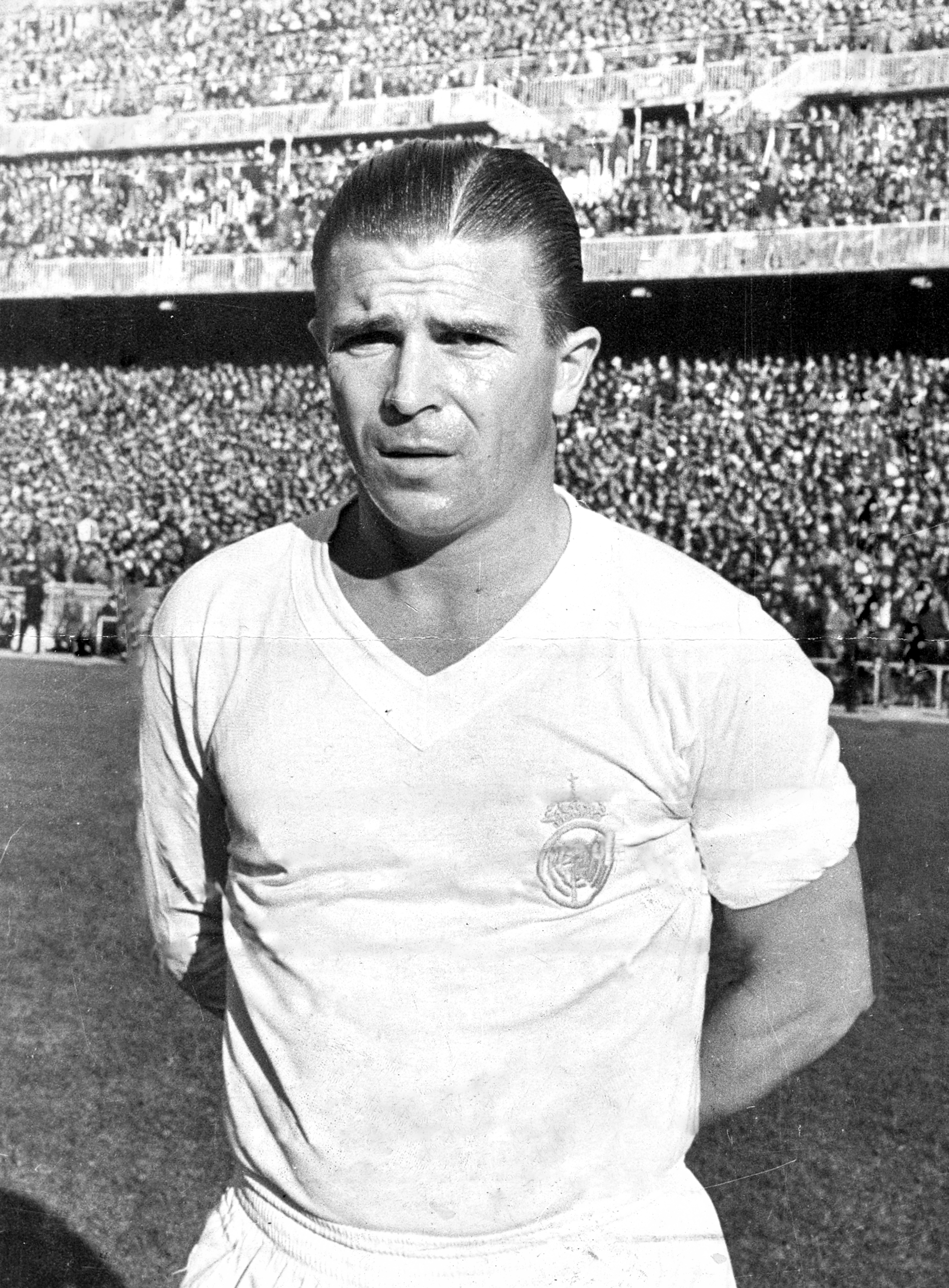
Ferenc Puskás, the only player to score six goals in a single match in Real Madrid's history.

- Most goals scored in a match in all competitions: 6 – (Hungary) (Spain) Ferenc Puskás v Real Betis, 1960–61 Copa del Generalísimo, 18 June 1961
- Most goals scored in La Liga match: 5
  - (Spain) Manuel Alday v Espanyol, 28 February 1943
  - (Spain) Miguel Muñoz v Lleida, 30 January 1951
  - (Spain) Pepillo II v Elche, 7 February 1960
  - (Spain) Fernando Morientes v Las Palmas, 9 February 2002
  - (Portugal) Cristiano Ronaldo v Granada, 5 April 2015
  - (Portugal) Cristiano Ronaldo v Espanyol, 12 September 2015
- Most goals scored in a Copa del Rey match: 6 – (Hungary) (Spain) Ferenc Puskás v Real Betis, 18 June 1961
- Most goals scored in a Copa de la Liga match: 4 – (Spain) Santillana v Real Zaragoza, 22 June 1983 ^{(Shared record)}
- Most goals scored in a Supercopa de España match: 3 ^{(Shared record)}
  - (Spain) Raúl v Zaragoza, 2001 Supercopa de España, 22 August 2001
  - (Brazil) Vinícius Júnior v Barcelona, 2023–24 Supercopa de España, 14 January 2024
- Most goals scored in a European Cup / UEFA Champions League match: 4
  - (Hungary) (Spain) Ferenc Puskás v Eintracht Frankfurt, final 1959–60, 18 May 1960 and v Feyenoord, preliminary round 1965–66, 22 September 1965
  - (Argentina) (Colombia) (Spain) Alfredo Di Stéfano v Sevilla, quarter-final 1957–58, 23 January 1958, and v Wiener Sport-Club, quarter-final 1958–59, 18 March 1959
  - (Mexico) Hugo Sánchez v Swarovski Tirol, second round 1990–91, 24 October 1990
  - (Portugal) Cristiano Ronaldo v Malmö FF, group stage 2015–16, 8 December 2015
  - (France) Kylian Mbappé v Olympiacos, league phase 2025–26, 26 November 2025
- Most goals scored in a UEFA Cup match: 3
  - (Spain) Emilio Butragueño v Anderlecht, third round 1984–85 UEFA Cup, 12 December 1984
  - (Spain) Fernando Hierro v Torpedo Moscow, second round 1992–93 UEFA Cup, 21 October 1992
- Most goals scored in a European Cup Winners' Cup match: 3 – (Spain) Juan Planelles v Hibernians, first round 1970–71 European Cup Winners' Cup, 30 September 1970
- Most goals scored in a UEFA Super Cup match: 2 – (Portugal) Cristiano Ronaldo v Sevilla, 2014 UEFA Super Cup, 12 August 2014
- Most goals scored in an Intercontinental Cup match: 2 – (Hungary) (Spain) Ferenc Puskás v Peñarol, 1960 Intercontinental Cup, 4 September 1960
- Most goals scored in a FIFA Club World Cup match: 3 ^{(Shared record)}
  - (Portugal) Cristiano Ronaldo v Kashima Antlers, 2016 FIFA Club World Cup final, 18 December 2016
  - (Wales) Gareth Bale v Kashima Antlers, 2018 FIFA Club World Cup semi-final, 19 December 2018
- Most goals scored in an FIFA Intercontinental Cup match: 1
  - (France) Kylian Mbappé v Pachuca, 2024 FIFA Intercontinental Cup final, 18 December 2024
  - (Brazil) Rodrygo v Pachuca, 2024 FIFA Intercontinental Cup final, 18 December 2024
  - (Brazil) Vinícius Júnior v Pachuca, 2024 FIFA Intercontinental Cup final, 18 December 2024
- Most goals scored in away match: 5 – (Portugal) Cristiano Ronaldo v Espanyol, 12 September 2015
- Most goals scored in final match: 4 – (Hungary) (Spain) Ferenc Puskás v Eintracht Frankfurt, 1960 European Cup final, 18 May 1960

==== Historical goals ====
Goal	Name	Date	Match
1st ever	(Ireland) Arthur Johnson	13 May 1902	Barcelona 3–1 Madrid
1st in Copa del Rey	(Cuba) Armando Giralt	6 April 1903	Madrid 4–1 Español
1st in La Liga	(Spain) Jaime Lazcano	10 February 1929	Real Madrid 5–0 Europa
1000th in La Liga	(Spain) Pahiño	5 November 1950	Athletic 2–5 Real Madrid
1st in European Cup	(Spain) Miguel Muñoz	8 September 1955	Servette 0–2 Real Madrid
2000th in La Liga	(Spain) Paco Gento	9 November 1963	Real Madrid 3–1 Pontevedra
3000th in La Liga	(Spain) Juanito	20 January 1982	Salamanca 1–3 Real Madrid
1000th in Copa del Rey	(Spain) Emilio Butragueño	5 February 1986	Recreativo 3–1 Real Madrid
4000th in La Liga	(Chile) Iván Zamorano	22 December 1994	Valladolid 0–5 Real Madrid
5000th in La Liga	(Spain) Guti	14 September 2008	Real Madrid 4–3 Numancia
1000th in international competitions	(Wales) Gareth Bale	27 November 2013	Real Madrid 4–1 Galatasaray
1000th in European competitions	(France) Karim Benzema	16 September 2014	Real Madrid 5–1 Basel
6000th in La Liga	(Spain) Marco Asensio	18 February 2018	Betis 3–5 Real Madrid
1000th in European Cup/Champions League	(France) Karim Benzema	3 November 2021	Real Madrid 2–1 Shakhtar Donetsk
10000th ever	(France) Aurélien Tchouaméni	2 April 2025	Real Madrid 4–4 Real Sociedad

==== Consecutive scoring ====
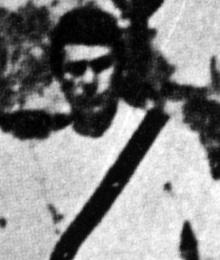
Arthur Johnson, the first player to score an official goal in Real Madrid's history.

- Most consecutive matches with goals: 12 – (Portugal) Cristiano Ronaldo, 25 August 2014 – 1 November 2014 and 10 February 2018 – 18 April 2018
- Most consecutive matches with goals in La Liga: 11 – (Portugal) Cristiano Ronaldo, 25 August 2014 – 22 November 2014 (Note: On 7 May 2014, Cristiano Ronaldo played against Real Valladolid for only eight minutes before leaving due to injury without scoring a goal. This eight-minute appearance disrupted a streak between 2 March and 22 November 2014, spanning 19 matches. He had scored in eight consecutive matches before the game and in 11 consecutive matches after it. If he scored in this match, he would have scored in 20 consecutive matches.)
- Most consecutive matches with goals in Copa del Rey: 7
  - (Spain) Gaspar Rubio, 16 December 1928 – 27 January 1929
  - (Hungary) (Spain) Ferenc Puskás, 19 June 1960 – 1 June 1961
- Most consecutive matches with goals in UEFA Champions League: 11 – (Portugal) Cristiano Ronaldo, 3 June 2017 – 11 April 2018 ^{(Record)}
- Most consecutive home matches with goals: 10
  - (Spain) Pruden, 31 March 1946 – 17 November 1946 (Note: The run comprised four matches at the Chamartín, which served as Real Madrid's home ground, and six at the Metropolitano de Madrid, which the club temporarily adopted as its home venue during the 1946–1947 years. During this period, Real Madrid played its official home fixtures at the Metropolitano while construction was underway on the Real Madrid Football Stadium (now known as the Bernabéu), with the club subsequently relocating to the new stadium.)
  - (Argentina) (Colombia) (Spain) Alfredo Di Stéfano, 15 January 1956 – 9 September 1956
- Most consecutive away matches with goals: 8 – (Portugal) Cristiano Ronaldo, 20 September 2014 – 26 November 2014

==== Hat-tricks ====
- Most hat-tricks: 44 – (Portugal) Cristiano Ronaldo, 2009–2018
- Most hat-tricks in La Liga: 34 – (Portugal) Cristiano Ronaldo, 2009–2018
- Most hat-tricks in Copa del Rey: 6 – (Hungary) (Spain) Ferenc Puskás, 1958–1966
- Most hat-tricks in UEFA Champions League: 7 – (Portugal) Cristiano Ronaldo, 2009–2018
- Most hat-tricks in a single season: 8 – (Portugal) Cristiano Ronaldo, 2014–15 (Note: All in La Liga – once with four goals and once with five goals.)
- Fastest hat-trick: 4 minutes
  - (Spain) Gaspar Rubio v Atletico Madrid, 1929–30 La Liga, 16 February 1930
  - (Spain) Pahiño v Gimnàstic Tarragona, 1949–50 La Liga, 16 April 1950
- Fastest hat-trick in Copa del Rey: 5 minutes – (Spain) Santillana v Las Palmas, 1974–75 Copa del Generalísimo, 14 June 1975
- Fastest hat-trick in European Cup / UEFA Champions League: 7 minutes (Note: Mbappé scored the hat-trick, between minutes 22 and 29, in 6 minutes and 42 seconds. Of Amancio's hat-trick, scored between minutes 61 and 68, there is no precise reference that shows the exact timing of the goals.)
  - (Spain) Amancio v Sparta Praha, 1967–68 European Cup, 6 March 1968
  - (France) Kylian Mbappé v Olympiacos, 2025–26 UEFA Champions League, 26 November 2025
- Fastest four goals: 18 minutes – (Spain) Pahiño v Gimnàstic Tarragona, 1949–50 La Liga, 16 April 1950
- Fastest five goals: 39 minutes – (Spain) Pepillo II v Elche, 1959–60 La Liga, 7 February 1960
- Fastest hat-trick from the start of the match: 15 minutes – (Spain) Pruden v Racing Ferrol, 1947 Copa del Generalísimo, 27 April 1947
- Longest hat-trick: 95 minutes – (Spain) Santiago Bernabéu v Barcelona, 1916 Copa del Rey, 13 April 1916 (Note: Bernabéu scored his first goal in the 23rd minute and his third goal in the 118th minute of extra time. However, many sources attribute the first goal to Barcelona goalkeeper Luis Bru as an own goal. If this case is excluded, the longest hat-trick would be to Cristiano Ronaldo, lasting 86 minutes between the first and third goals (2', 54', 88') against Athletic Bilbao on 5 October 2014.)
- Youngest player to score a hat-trick: 18 years, 113 days – (Spain) Raúl v Ferencváros, 1995–96 UEFA Champions League, 18 October 1995
- Youngest player to score a hat-trick in La Liga: 19 years, 215 days – (Spain) Pablo Olmedo v Celta Vigo, 1948–49 La Liga, 14 November 1948 (Note: Scored four goals in this match.)
- Youngest player to score a hat-trick in Copa del Rey: 18 years, 329 days – (Spain) Juan Monjardín v Arenas Club de Getxo, 1922 Copa del Rey, 19 March 1922
- Oldest player to score a hat-trick: 38 years, 173 days – (Hungary) (Spain) Ferenc Puskás v Feyenoord, 1965–66 European Cup, 22 September 1965
- Oldest player to score a hat-trick in La Liga: 37 years, 255 days – (Argentina) (Colombia) (Spain) Alfredo Di Stéfano v Real Murcia, 1962–63 La Liga, 15 March 1963
- Oldest player to score a hat-trick in Copa del Rey: 38 years, 44 days – (Hungary) (Spain) Ferenc Puskás v Mestalla, 1964–65 Copa del Generalísimo, 16 May 1965
- Most consecutive hat-tricks: 3 – (Hungary) (Spain) Ferenc Puskás, 8 May 1960 – 5 June 1960 (Note: Scored eleven goals in those matches.)
- Longest gap between consecutive hat-tricks: 9 years, 154 days – (Spain) Fernando Hierro, 21 October 1992 – 24 March 2002
- Longest gap between first and last hat-tricks: 12 years, 132 days – (France) Karim Benzema, 18 December 2010 – 29 April 2023
- Players who scored a hat-trick in a final match:
  - (Argentina) (Colombia) (Spain) Alfredo Di Stéfano v Eintracht Frankfurt, 1960 European Cup final, 18 May 1960
  - (Hungary) Ferenc Puskás v Eintracht Frankfurt, 1960 European Cup final, 18 May 1960
  - (Hungary) Ferenc Puskás v Benfica, 1962 European Cup final, 2 May 1960
  - (Spain) Raúl v Real Zaragoza, 2001 Supercopa de España, 22 August 2001
  - (Portugal) Cristiano Ronaldo v Kashima Antlers, 2016 FIFA Club World Cup final, 18 December 2016
  - (Brazil) Vinícius Júnior v Barcelona, 2024 Supercopa de España final, 14 January 2024

==== Fastest goals ====
- Fastest goal: 13 seconds – (Chile) Iván Zamorano v Sevilla, 1994–95 La Liga, 3 September 1994
- Fastest goal in Copa del Rey: 15 seconds – (Spain) Paco Gento v Racing Santander, 1960–61 Copa del Rey, 28 May 1961
- Fastest goal in international competitions: 34 seconds – (Turkey) Arda Güler v Bayern Munich, 2025–26 UEFA Champions League, 15 April 2026 (Note: Arda’s goal is considered earlier by fractions of a second than Felo’s goal against Juventus in 1962.)
- Fastest goal in final match: 1 minute – (Spain) Enrique Mateos v Stade Reims, 1959 European Cup final, 3 June 1959
- Fastest goal by a substitute: 14 seconds – (Brazil) Vinícius Júnior v Shakhtar Donetsk, 2020–21 UEFA Champions League, 21 October 2020
- Fastest goal by a substitute in La Liga: 31 seconds – (Spain) Marco Asensio v Valencia, 2019–20 La Liga, 18 June 2020
- Fastest goal by a debutant: 62 seconds – (Brazil) Ronaldo v Alavés, 2002–03 La Liga, 6 October 2002

===== List of fastest goals in Real Madrid's history =====
Note: Maximum of 30 seconds.

Player	Time	Against	Result	Competition	Date	Notes	Ref
(Chile) Iván Zamorano	13 sec	Sevilla	4–1	1994–95 La Liga	3 September 1994		
(Brazil) Ronaldo	14 sec	Atlético Madrid	2–0	2003–04 La Liga	3 December 2003	Fastest goal in Madrid Derby history.	
(Spain) Paco Gento	15 sec	Racing Santander	3–0	1960–61 Copa del Rey	28 May 1961	Fastest goal by a Spanish player.	
(Spain) Manuel Alday	20 sec	Racing Santander	3–2	1939–40 La Liga	25 February 1940		
(France) Karim Benzema	21 sec	Barcelona	1–3	2011–12 La Liga	10 December 2011	Fastest goal in El Clásico history.	
(Spain) Raúl	23 sec	Espanyol	1–2	2001–02 La Liga	3 February 2002		
(Dominican Republic) Mariano Díaz	23 sec	Cultural Leonesa	6–1	2016–17 Copa del Rey	30 November 2016		
(Mexico) Hugo Sánchez	24 sec	Sporting Gijón	4–0	1986–87 La Liga	30 May 1987		
(Spain) Chus Alonso	30 sec	Granada	6–2	1944–45 La Liga	8 April 1945		
(Spain) Alfonso Navarro	30 sec	Deportivo La Coruña	2–1	1950–51 La Liga	25 February 1951		

==== Latest goals ====
- Latest goal: 121:40 minutes – (Morocco) Brahim Diaz v Atlético Madrid, 2024 Supercopa de España, 10 January 2024
- Latest goal in regulation time: 99:34 minutes – (France) Kylian Mbappé v Rayo Vallecano, 2025–26 La Liga, 1 February 2026
- Latest goal being the opener: 107 minutes – (Spain) Pau Vidal v Espanyol, 1947 Copa del Generalísimo final, 22 June 1947
- Latest goal in regulation time being the opener: 96:55 minutes – (Portugal) Cristiano Ronaldo v Juventus, 2017–18 UEFA Champions League, 11 April 2018
- Latest goal under exceptional circumstances: 95 days – (Mexico) Hugo Sánchez v Osasuna, 1988–89 La Liga, 3 May 1989 (Note: In La Liga against Osasuna, the match began on 28 January 1989, and continued until the 43th minute when the fans throwing fireworks at Paco Buyo caused the game's suspension with the score at 1–0 for Osasuna. Later, on 3 May 1989, after 95 days, the second half was played at La Romareda, and Hugo Sánchez managed to score the equalizer in the 86th minute, marking the longest goal from the opening whistle in Real Madrid's history.)

==== Furthest goals ====
- Furthest goal scored: 68.6 meters – (Turkey) Arda Güler v Elche, 2025–26 La Liga, 14 March 2026
- Furthest free kick goal scored: 40 meters – (Brazil) Didi v Espanyol, 1959–60 La Liga, 27 September 1959
- Real Madrid players who scored from Real's own half in an official match: (Note: Éder Militão scored a goal from Real's own half (60 meters) in a friendly match against Leganés on 5 August 2025.)
  - (Spain) Mikel Lasa v Sevilla, 1994–95 La Liga, 5 February 1995
  - (Turkey) Arda Güler v Elche, 2025–26 La Liga, 14 March 2026

===== List of furthest goals in Real Madrid's history =====
Real Madrid's own half

Note: Minimum of 40 meters.

Player	Distance	Against	Result	Competition	Date	Notes	Ref
(Turkey) Arda Güler	68 meters	Elche	4–1	2025–26 La Liga	14 March 2026		
(Spain) Mikel Lasa	58 meters	Sevilla	2–0	1994–95 La Liga	5 February 1995		
(Spain) Luis Marín	51 meters (Note: This distance is an approximate geometric inference, as no contemporary source specifies the exact range of the shot. Contemporary reports published by Pueblo, Hoja Oficial del Lunes, and Mundo Deportivo consistently state that Marín scored directly from the centre spot (or from the halfway line) at Buenavista Stadium. According to Real Oviedo's official website, the stadium measured 102 metres in length at the time; therefore, the shooting distance can be estimated at approximately 49–51 metres, depending on Marín's exact position when striking the ball.)	Real Oviedo	2–0	1940–41 La Liga	27 October 1940		
(Romania) Gheorghe Hagi	45 meters	Osasuna	5–2	1991–92 La Liga	11 January 1992		
(Netherlands) Clarence Seedorf	45 meters	Atlético Madrid	1–1	1997–98 La Liga	30 August 1997		
(Spain) Santiago Aragón	42 meters	Barcelona	4–1	1990 Supercopa de España	12 December 1990	Furthest goal excluding La Liga.	
(Brazil) Didi	40 meters	Espanyol	4–0	1959–60 La Liga	27 September 1959	Free kick goal.	

==== Oldest and youngest ====
- Youngest goalscorer: 17 years, 114 days – (Spain) Alberto Rivera v Celta Vigo, 1994–95 La Liga, 10 June 1995
- Youngest goalscorer, including regional competitions: 15 years, 38 days – (France) René Petit v Sociedad Gimnástica, Campeonato Regional Centro, 15 November 1914
- Youngest goalscorer in Copa del Rey: 17 years, 219 days – (France) René Petit v Arenas Club de Getxo, 1917 Copa del Rey, 15 May 1917
- Youngest goalscorer in international competitions: 18 years, 58 days – (Brazil) Endrick v Stuttgart, 2024–25 UEFA Champions League, 17 September 2024
- Oldest goalscorer: 39 years, 167 days – (Croatia) Luka Modrić v Girona, 2024–25 La Liga, 23 February 2025
- Oldest goalscorer in Copa del Rey: 39 years, 149 days – (Croatia) Luka Modrić v Leganés, 2024–25 Copa del Rey, 5 February 2025
- Oldest goalscorer in international competitions: 38 years, 174 days – (Hungary) (Spain) Ferenc Puskás v Feyenoord, 1965–66 European Cup, 22 September 1965

==== Penalties ====
Note: Not including penalty shoot-outs.
- Most penalty kick goals: 79 – (Portugal) Cristiano Ronaldo, 2009–2018
- Most penalty kick goals in a match: 3 – (Argentina) (Colombia) (Spain) Alfredo Di Stéfano v Celta Vigo, 1957–58 La Liga, 20 April 1958 (Note: Di Stéfano is the only player to have scored three penalties in the history of Real Madrid, but he is one of three players to have taken three penalties in a single match; Vilmos Kelemen on 17 November 1935, and Luis Molowny on 14 October 1951. Both scored two penalties and missed one in the same match.)
- Most penalty kick goals in a season: 14
  - (Mexico) Hugo Sánchez, 1986–87
  - (Portugal) Cristiano Ronaldo, 2011–12
- Most penalties missed: 13 – (Portugal) Cristiano Ronaldo, 2009–2018
- Most penalties missed in a match: 2 – (France) Karim Benzema v Osasuna, 2021–22 La Liga, 20 April 2022
- Most penalties missed in a season: 4
  - (Spain) Juanito, 1980–81
  - (France) Karim Benzema, 2021–22
- Fastest penalty: 1 minute
  - (Argentina) (Colombia) (Spain) Alfredo Di Stéfano v Atlético Madrid, 1953–54 La Liga, 1 November 1953
  - (Mexico) Hugo Sánchez v Castellón, 1990–91 La Liga, 27 January 1991
- Most penalties, all scored: 12 – (Croatia) Davor Šuker, 1996–1999
- Most penalties, all missed: 1 – 15 players
- Most goals, all penalties: 9 – (Spain) Pepe Corona, 1943–1948
- Most goals, without penalties: 101 – (Chile) Iván Zamorano, 1992–1996 (Note: Zamorano took only one penalty during his career with Real Madrid, and he failed to convert it, in a match against Real Zaragoza on 4 September 1995.)

==== Free kicks ====
Note: Includes direct and indirect free kicks.
- Most free kick goals: 32 – (Portugal) Cristiano Ronaldo, 2009–2018
- Most free kick goals in a match: 2
  - (Mexico) Hugo Sánchez v Cádiz, 1986–87 La Liga, 22 February 1987
  - (Mexico) Hugo Sánchez v Sporting Gijón, 1988–89 Copa del Rey, 22 February 1989
  - (Argentina) Santiago Solari v Tenerife, 2004–05 Copa del Rey, 10 November 2004
  - (Portugal) Cristiano Ronaldo v Zürich, 2009–10 UEFA Champions League, 15 September 2009
  - (Portugal) Cristiano Ronaldo v Villarreal, 2010–11 La Liga, 15 May 2011
- Most free kick goals in a match by a team: 3 – Real Madrid v Sporting Gijón, 1988–89 Copa del Rey, 22 February 1989 (Note: Two scored by Hugo Sánchez and one by Bernd Schuster.)
- Most free kick goals in a season: 8 – (Brazil) Roberto Carlos, 2000–01
- Most free kick goals in a calendar year: 9 – (Mexico) Hugo Sánchez, 1989

==== Own goals ====
- Most own goals: 4
  - (Spain) José Antonio Salguero, 1982–1987
  - (Spain) Sergio Ramos, 2005–2021
  - (France) Raphaël Varane, 2011–2021
- Most own goals in a match: 1 (Note: No player has scored more than one own goal in a single match.)
- Most own goals in a season: 3 – (Spain) José Antonio Salguero, 1985–86
- Fastest own goal: 4 minutes – (Spain) Pedro Casado v Atlético Madrid, 1962–63 La Liga, 17 March 1963
- Fastest own goal by a debutant: 24 minutes – (England) Jonathan Woodgate v Athletic Bilbao, 2005–06 La Liga, 22 September 2005
- Latest own goal: 104 minutes – (Spain) José Antonio Salguero v Real Sociedad, 1982 Supercopa de España, 28 December 1982
- Latest own goal in regulation time: 93 minutes – (Spain) Nacho v Arandina, 2023–24 Copa del Rey, 6 January 2024

==== Headers ====
- Most headed goals: 112 – (Spain) Santillana, 1971–1988
- Most headed goals in a match: 4 – (Spain) Fernando Morientes v Las Palmas, 2001–02 La Liga, 10 February 2002
- Other players to score three headed goals in a match:
  - (Spain) Fernando Sañudo v Arenas, 1934–35 La Liga, 28 April 1935 (Note: Sañudo is the only player to score three headed goals in one half in Real Madrid history.)
  - (Spain) Santillana v Real Betis, 1973–74 Copa del Generalísimo, 1 June 1974
  - (Argentina) Jorge Valdano v Elche, 1984–85 La Liga, 20 February 1985
- Most headed goals in a season: 17 – (Portugal) Cristiano Ronaldo, 2014–15

==== Other methods ====
- Most outside the box goals: 30 (Note: Do not include direct free kick goals.) (Note: It is likely that Ferenc Puskás has already exceeded this number, as some newspapers describe many of his goals with descriptions that may indicate he scored from outside the penalty box, such as "a goal from a long distance." However, due to the lack of actual detailed distance for the goal and the absence of footage for many goals, the true number cannot be confirmed.) – (Portugal) Cristiano Ronaldo, 2009–2018
- Most bicycle kick goals: 12 – (Mexico) Hugo Sánchez, 1985–1992
- Most direct corner-kick goals: 1
  - (Spain) Cándido Urretavizcaya v Real Unión, 1930–31 La Liga, 15 February 1931 (Note: Many sources attribute the goal as an own goal by Real Unión goalkeeper Antonio Emery. However, contemporary newspapers explicitly state that the goal was scored directly from a corner kick due to the wind, without the goalkeeper making any contact with the ball.)
  - (Spain) Eugenio Hilario v Barcelona, 1933–34 La Liga, 28 January 1934
  - (Spain) Leoncito v Osasuna, 1934 Copa del Presidente de la República, 25 March 1934
  - (Spain) Alfonso Sanz v Atlético Aviación, 1940–41 La Liga, 29 December 1940
  - (Spain) Pedro Arsuaga v Barcelona, 1952–53 La Liga, 23 November 1952
  - (Hungary) (Spain) Ferenc Puskás v Atlético Madrid, 1960 Copa del Generalísimo final, 26 June 1960
  - (Croatia) Davor Šuker v Mérida, 1997–98 La Liga, 14 December 1997
  - (Germany) Toni Kroos v Valencia, 2019–20 Supercopa de España, 8 January 2020

==== By time ====
- Most goals scored in first half: 203 – (Portugal) Cristiano Ronaldo, 2009–2018
- Most goals scored in second half: 241 – (Portugal) Cristiano Ronaldo, 2009–2018
- Most goals scored in extra time periods: 6 – (Portugal) Cristiano Ronaldo, 2009–2018

==== By position ====
- Most goals scored by a goalkeeper: 0 (Note: No goalkeeper has ever scored for Real Madrid in an official match throughout the club's history. The closest moment for a goalkeeper to score was Thibaut Courtois against Valencia in 2019–20 La Liga on 15 December 2019, when he headed the ball in the final minutes of the match, forcing a difficult save from the goalkeeper, and Karim Benzema followed up to score.)
- Most goals scored by a defender: 128 – (Spain) Fernando Hierro, 1989–2003 (Note: Fernando Hierro played as a midfielder for three seasons between 1991–92 and 1993–94, after Radomir Antić converted him from centre-back to midfield. Benito Floro continued to deploy him in that role over the following two seasons, before Jorge Valdano restored him to the centre-back position in 1994–95. During those three seasons in midfield, he scored 56 goals, while he netted 72 goals as an out-and-out defender across his remaining seasons at Real Madrid. Excluding this period in midfield, Sergio Ramos is the highest-scoring defender in Real Madrid history, with 101 goals.)
- Most goals scored by a midfielder: 171 – (Spain) Pirri, 1964–1980

==== Finals ====
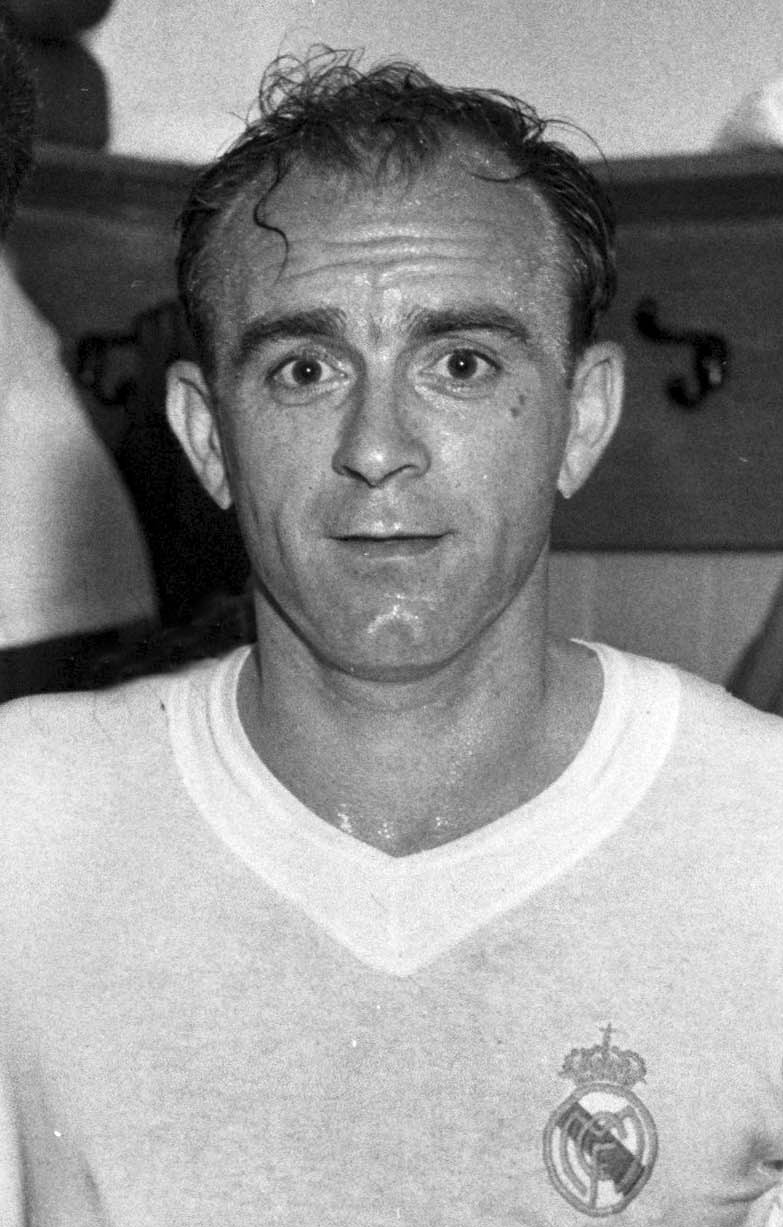
Alfredo Di Stéfano scored in five European Cup finals with Real Madrid.

- Most goals scored in finals: 15 – (Portugal) Cristiano Ronaldo, 2009–2018
- Most finals scored in: 10 – (Portugal) Cristiano Ronaldo, 2009–2018
- Most goals scored in European Cup Finals: 7
  - (Argentina) (Colombia) (Spain) Alfredo Di Stéfano, one in 1956, 1957, 1958, 1959 and three in 1960
  - (Hungary) (Spain) Ferenc Puskás, four in 1960 and three in 1962
- Most goals scored in UEFA Champions League Finals: 3
  - (Portugal) Cristiano Ronaldo, one in 2014, and two in 2017
  - (Wales) Gareth Bale, one in 2014, and two in 2018
- Most goals scored in UEFA Cup Finals: 3
  - (Argentina) Jorge Valdano, one in 1985, and two in 1986
- Most goals scored in club world championships Finals: 4
  - (Portugal) Cristiano Ronaldo, three in 2016, and one in 2017
- Most goals scored in Supercopa de España Finals: 7
  - (Spain) Raúl, three in 1997, 2001, and one in 2003
- Most goals scored in Copa del Rey Finals: 4
  - (Spain) Manuel Prast, one in 1905, 1907, and two in 1906
  - (Spain) Jaime Lazcano, one in 1929, 1930, 1933 and 1934
  - (Hungary) (Spain) Ferenc Puskás, one in 1960, 1961 and two in 1962
- Most goals scored in Copa de la Liga Finals: 2
  - (Spain) Santillana, one in 1983 and 1985

==== Others ====
- Most seasons scored in: 17 – (Spain) Santillana, 1971–1988
- Most competitions scored in: 8 – (Spain) Fernando Hierro (La Liga, Copa del Rey, Supercopa de España, UEFA Champions League, UEFA Cup, European Cup Winners' Cup, Copa Iberoamericana and FIFA Club World Championship)
- Most competitions scored in during a single season: 7 – (France) Kylian Mbappé in 2024–25 (La Liga, Copa del Rey, Supercopa de España, UEFA Champions League, UEFA Super Cup, FIFA Intercontinental Cup and FIFA Club World Cup)
- Most goals in calendar year: 59
  - (Portugal) Cristiano Ronaldo, 2013
  - (France) Kylian Mbappé, 2025
- Most goals as a substitute: 24 – (France) Karim Benzema, 2009–2023
- Most goals in debut season: 44 – (France) Kylian Mbappé, 2024–25
- Most goals in La Liga debut season: 31 – (France) Kylian Mbappé, 2024–25
- Most games scoring: 274 – (Portugal) Cristiano Ronaldo, 2009–2018
- Most games scoring in a season: 37 – (Portugal) Cristiano Ronaldo, 2011–12
- Longest time between consecutive goals by a player: 11 years, 256 days – (Spain) Joselu, 20 December 2011 – 2 September 2023
- Longest time between first and last goal by a player: 16 years, 253 days – (Spain) Santillana, 12 September 1971 – 22 May 1988 (Note: He played a total of 645 matches, the sixth overall in the club, and he managed to score in his second and in his last matches.)
- Most consecutive matches for a forward without scoring goals: 32 matches – (Brazil) Rodrygo, 9 March 2025 – 7 December 2025 (Note: This spanned 1,415 minutes, one minute short of Rafael Marañón's goalless streak.)
- Most consecutive minutes for a forward without scoring goals: 1,416 minutes – (Spain) Rafael Marañón, 25 June 1972 – 27 January 1974
- Most games scoring 100% of the team's goals: 69 – (Spain) Raúl, 1994–2010
- Players scoring more goals than appearances for Real Madrid:
  - (Portugal) Cristiano Ronaldo, 450/438
  - (Spain) Fernando Sañudo, 50/48
  - (Spain) Marcial Arbiza, 29/27
  - (Spain) José María Benguria, 7/6
  - (Spain) Luis Belaunde, 3/2
  - (Spain) Ramon Masagué, 3/2

=== Assists ===
==== Most assists ====
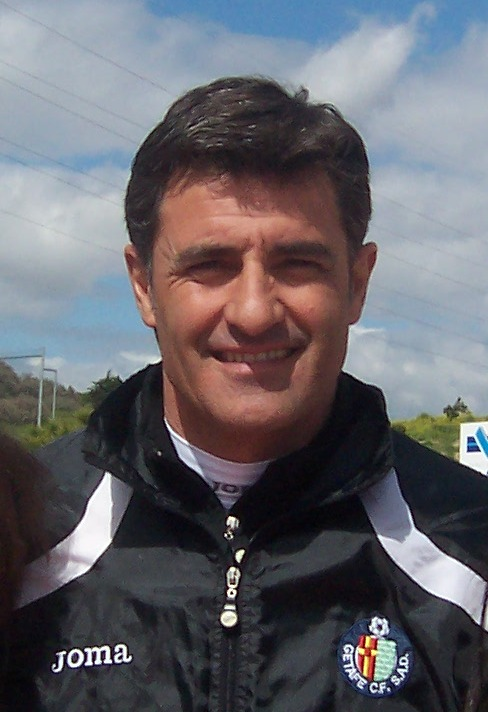
Míchel holds the assists record, with 201

Notes: The criteria for an assist to be awarded may vary according to the source, the following stats is based on the assists criteria according to Opta, where assists are not counted for balls that are deflected or rebounded off opposing players and have clearly affected the trajectory of the ball and its arrival to the recipient (the goal scorer). Assists are also not counted for penalty kicks, direct goals from corners or free kicks, or own goals. These statistics include assists in all official matches from 1902 to the present day. This information is gathered according to official sources, reports, and reliable records in club, association, and press archives. At least 100 assists.

Rank	Player	Assists	Period
1	(Spain) Míchel	201	1982–1996
2	(Spain) Paco Gento	165	1953–1971
3	(France) Karim Benzema	148	2009–2023
4	(Argentina) (Colombia) (Spain) Alfredo Di Stéfano	137	1953–1964
5	(Hungary) (Spain) Ferenc Puskás	133	1958–1966
6	(Spain) Juanito	123	1977–1987
7	(Spain) Amancio	120	1962–1976
8	(Portugal) Cristiano Ronaldo	119	2009–2018
9	(Spain) Raúl	115	1994–2010
10	(Spain) Emilio Butragueño	109	1984–1995
11	(Brazil) Roberto Carlos	102	1996–2007

==== By competition ====
- Most assists in all competitions: 201 – (Spain) Míchel, 1982–1996
- Most assists in La Liga: 147 – (Spain) Míchel, 1982–1996
- Most assists in Copa del Rey: 28 – (Spain) Paco Gento, 1953–1971
- Most assists in Supercopa de España: 3
  - (Spain) Míchel, 1982–1996
  - (Portugal) Pepe, 2007–2017
  - (France) Karim Benzema, 2009–2023
  - (Brazil) Rodrygo, 2019–
- Most assists in European Cup / UEFA Champions League: 28
  - (Spain) Paco Gento, 1953–1971
  - (Portugal) Cristiano Ronaldo, 2009–2018
- Most assists in UEFA Cup: 11 – (Spain) Míchel, 1982–1996
- Most assists in European Cup Winners' Cup / UEFA Cup Winners' Cup: 5 – (Spain) Juanito, 1977–1987
- Most assists in UEFA Super Cup: 3 – (Wales) Gareth Bale, 2013–2022
- Most assists in FIFA Club World Cup: 4 – (Germany) Toni Kroos, 2014–2024
- Most assists in FIFA Intercontinental Cup: 1
  - (Brazil) Vinícius Júnior, 2018–
  - (France) Kylian Mbappé, 2024–

==== In a single season ====
_{This table lists players who have assisted at least 20 assists in a single season. The following table shows the number of assists according to Opta's criteria.}

Rank	Player	Assists	Season
1	(Spain) Míchel	27	1992–93
2	(Argentina) Héctor Rial	26	1955–56
2	(Spain) Míchel	26	1987–88
2	(Portugal) Luís Figo	26	2000–01
2	(Germany) Mesut Özil	26	2010–11
6	(Hungary) Ferenc Puskás	25	1960–61
7	(Hungary) Ferenc Puskás	24	1959–60
7	(Germany) Mesut Özil	24	2011–12
7	(Argentina) Ángel Di María	24	2013–14
10	(Spain) Juanito	23	1980–81
10	(Spain) Míchel	23	1986–87
10	(Germany) Mesut Özil	23	2012–13
13	(France) Raymond Kopa	21	1957–58
13	(Portugal) Cristiano Ronaldo	21	2014–15
15	(Spain) Míchel	20	1989–90
15	(England) David Beckham	20	2005–06

===== In a single season by competition =====
- Most assists in a La Liga season: 21 – (Spain) Míchel, 1987–88
- Most assists in a Copa del Rey season: 8 – (Spain) Luis Regueiro, 1935–36
- Most assists in a European Cup / UEFA Champions League season: 7
  - (Portugal) Luís Figo, 2000–01
  - (Spain) Raúl, 2002–03
  - (Germany) Mesut Özil, 2010–11

==== In a single match ====
- Most assists in a single match: 5
  - (Spain) Amancio v Real Betis, 1973–74 Copa del Generalísimo, 1 June 1974
  - (Spain) Juanito v Athletic Bilbao, 1980–81 La Liga, 14 September 1980
- Most assists in a La Liga match: 5 – (Spain) Juanito v Athletic Bilbao, 1980–81 La Liga, 14 September 1980
- Most assists in a Copa del Rey match: 5 – (Spain) Amancio v Real Betis, 1973–74 Copa del Generalísimo, 1 June 1974
- Most assists in a Supercopa de España match: 2
  - (Spain) Míchel v Barcelona, 1993 Supercopa de España, 2 December 1993
  - (Spain) Dani Carvajal v Atlético Madrid, 2024 Supercopa de España, 10 January 2024
- Most assists in a Copa de la Liga match: 2 – (Spain) Juanito v Barcelona, 1986 Copa de la Liga, 11 May 1986
- Most assists in a European Cup / UEFA Champions League match: 4 – (Spain) Míchel v Swarovski Tirol, 1990–91 European Cup, 24 October 1990
- Most assists in a UEFA Cup match: 2
  - (Spain) Emilio Butragueño v Anderlecht, 1984–85 UEFA Cup, 12 December 1984
  - (Spain) Míchel v Videoton, 1984–85 UEFA Cup, 8 May 1985
  - (Spain) Emilio Butragueño v AEK Athens, 1985–86 UEFA Cup, 2 October 1985
  - (Spain) Rafael Gordillo v AEK Athens, 1985–86 UEFA Cup, 2 October 1985
  - (Spain) Juanito v Borussia Mönchengladbach, 1985–86 UEFA Cup, 11 December 1985
  - (Mexico) Hugo Sánchez v Inter Milan, 1985–86 UEFA Cup, 16 April 1986
  - (Spain) Adolfo Aldana v Neuchâtel Xamax, 1991–92 UEFA Cup, 11 December 1991
  - (Spain) Míchel v Politehnica Timișoara, 1992–93 UEFA Cup, 29 September 1992
- Most assists in a European Cup Winners' Cup / UEFA Cup Winners' Cup match: 2
  - (West Germany) Paul Breitner v Fram, 1974–75 European Cup Winners' Cup, 1 October 1974
  - (Spain) Juanito v Baia Mare, 1982–83 European Cup Winners' Cup, 29 September 1982
- Most assists in a FIFA Club World Cup match: 2
  - (Portugal) Cristiano Ronaldo v Cruz Azul, 2014 FIFA Club World Cup, 16 December 2014
  - (Brazil) Marcelo v Kashima Antlers, 2018 FIFA Club World Cup, 19 December 2018
  - (Turkey) Arda Güler v Borussia Dortmund, 2025 FIFA Club World Cup, 5 July 2025

==== Youngest and oldest ====
- Youngest assist provider: 16 years, 190 days – (France) René Petit v Barcelona, 1916 Copa del Rey, 15 April 1916 (Note: He provided two assists in this game.)
- Youngest assist provider in La Liga: 17 years, 124 days – (Spain) Raúl v Real Zaragoza, 1994–95 La Liga, 29 October 1994
- Youngest assist provider in international competitions: 18 years, 113 days – (Spain) Raúl v Ferencváros, 1995–96 UEFA Champions League, 18 October 1995
- Oldest assist provider: 39 years, 251 days – (Croatia) Luka Modrić v Sevilla, 2024–25 La Liga, 18 May 2025
- Oldest assist provider in Copa del Rey: 39 years, 15 days – (Hungary) (Spain) Ferenc Puskás v Sporting Gijón, 1965–66 Copa del Generalísimo, 17 April 1966
- Oldest assist provider in international competitions: 39 years, 135 days – (Croatia) Luka Modrić v RB Salzburg, 2024–25 UEFA Champions League, 22 January 2025

==== Other assist records ====
- Most assists in a season: 27 – (Spain) Míchel, 1992–93
- Most assists in calendar year: 30 – (Spain) Míchel, 1987
- Most seasons assisted in: 18 – (Spain) Paco Gento, 1953–1971
- Most assists in finals: 10 – (Spain) Míchel, 1982–1996 (Note: Three in Copa Iberoamericana, three in Supercopa de España, two in UEFA Cup, one in Copa del Rey and one in Copa de la Liga)
- Most consecutive matches assisting: 6
  - (Spain) Macala, 8 November 1948 – 23 January 1949
  - (Brazil) Vinícius Júnior, 12 April 2023 – 6 May 2023
- Most assists by a defender: 102 – (Brazil) Roberto Carlos, 1996–2007
- Most assists by a goalkeeper: 2 – (Belgium) Thibaut Courtois, 2018– (Note: He did so against Kairat Almaty on 30 September 2025 and against Manchester City on 11 March 2026, both in the 2025–26 UEFA Champions League.)
- Other goalkeepers who have provided assist:
  - (Spain) Manuel Pazos v Barcelona, 1953–54 La Liga, 25 October 1953
  - (Spain) Juan Alonso v Espanyol, 1956–57 La Liga, 6 January 1957
  - (Argentina) Rogelio Domínguez v Athletic Bilbao, 1959–60 Copa del Generalísimo, 19 June 1960
  - (Spain) Paco Buyo v Athletic Bilbao, 1993–94 La Liga, 5 December 1993
  - (Spain) Santiago Cañizares v Olympiacos, 1997–98 UEFA Champions League, 22 October 1997
  - (Spain) Kiko Casilla v Sevilla, 2016–17 Copa del Rey, 12 January 2017
  - (Ukraine) Andriy Lunin v Osasuna, 2024–25 La Liga, 9 November 2024

=== Goalkeeping ===
==== Clean sheets ====
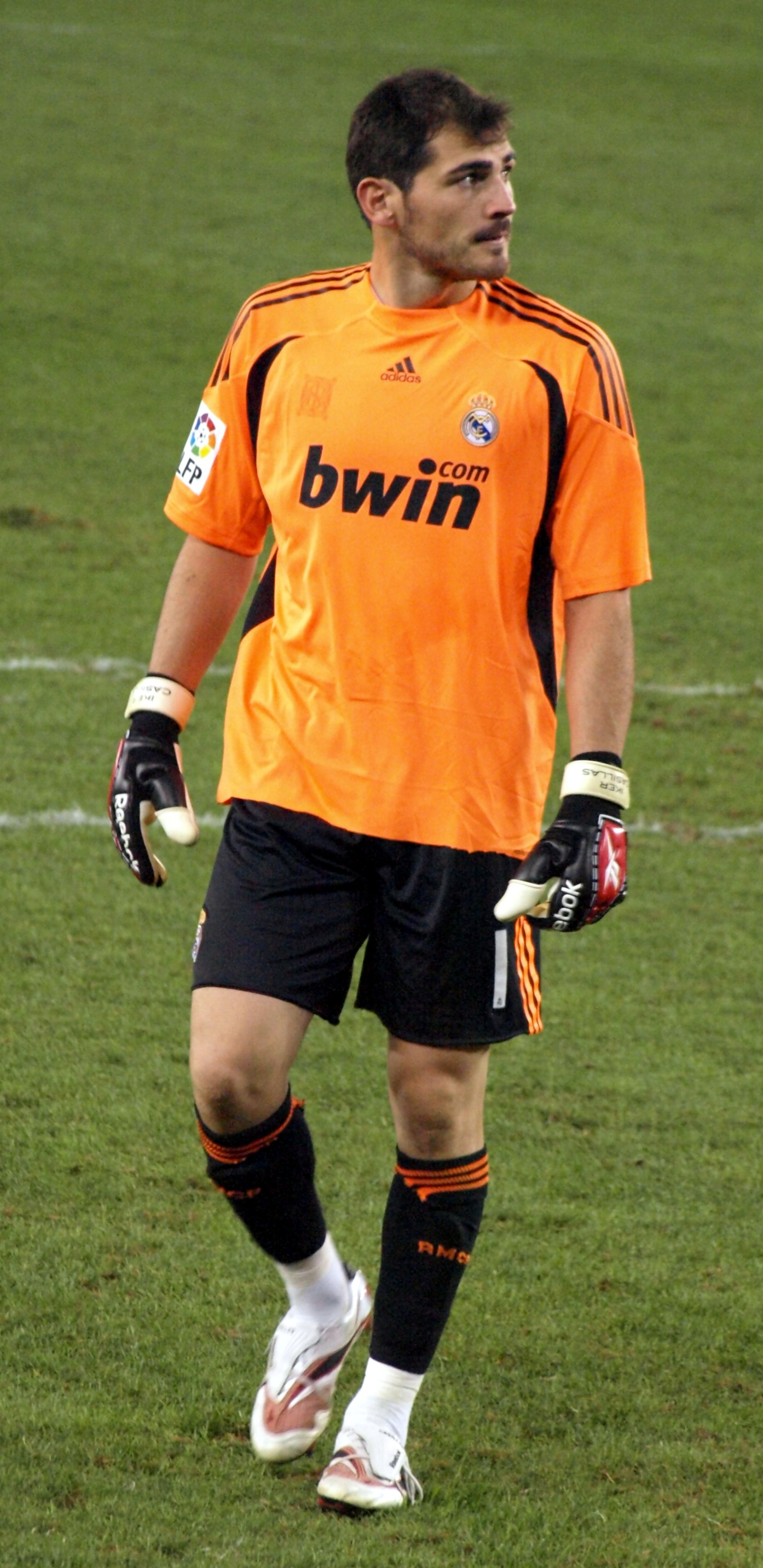
Iker Casillas holds the clean sheets record, with 264

- Most clean sheets: 264 – (Spain) Iker Casillas, 1999–2015
- Most clean sheets in La Liga: 177 – (Spain) Iker Casillas, 1999–2015
- Most clean sheets in Copa del Rey: 28 – (Spain) Iker Casillas, 1999–2015
- Most clean sheets in European Cup / UEFA Champions League: 53 – (Spain) Iker Casillas, 1999–2015
- Longest period without conceding a goal: 952 minutes – (Spain) Iker Casillas, 2013–14
- Longest period without conceding a goal in La Liga: 709 minutes
  - (Spain) Francisco Buyo, 1994–95
  - (Spain) Santiago Cañizares, 1997–98
- Longest period without conceding a goal in Copa del Rey: 1,029 minutes – (Spain) Iker Casillas, 2012–2014
- Longest period without conceding a goal in European Cup / UEFA Champions League: 738 minutes – (Costa Rica) Keylor Navas, 2014–2016

==== In a single season ====
- Most clean sheets in a single season: 26 – (Spain) Iker Casillas, 2010–11
- Most clean sheets in a single season in La Liga: 19 – (Spain) Francisco Buyo, 1986–87
- Most clean sheets in a single season in Copa del Rey: 8 – (Spain) Iker Casillas, 2013–14
- Most clean sheets in a single season in European Cup / UEFA Champions League: 9 – (Costa Rica) Keylor Navas, 2015–16

==== Oldest and youngest ====
- Youngest goalkeeper to keep a clean sheet: 17 years, 159 days – (Spain) Manuel Alcalde v Athletic Bilbao, 1905 Copa del Rey final, 18 April 1905
- Oldest goalkeeper to keep a clean sheet: 38 years, 63 days – (Spain) Paco Buyo v Albacete, 1995–96 La Liga, 16 March 1996

==== From start of the season ====
- Best clean sheets start by an individual goalkeeper: 5
  - (Argentina) Rogelio Domínguez, 1957–58
  - (Costa Rica) Keylor Navas, 2015–16
- Best clean sheets start by an individual goalkeeper in La Liga: 5 – (Argentina) Rogelio Domínguez, 1957–58
- Best clean sheets start by an individual goalkeeper in Copa del Rey: 8 – (Spain) Iker Casillas, 2013–14
- Best clean sheets start by an individual goalkeeper in European Cup / UEFA Champions League: 6 – (Costa Rica) Keylor Navas, 2015–16

==== Penalties saves ====
Note: Not including penalty shoot-outs.

- Most saved penalty kicks: 15 – (Spain) Iker Casillas, 1999–2015
- Most saved penalty kicks in a season: 4 – (Spain) Miguel Ángel, 1978–79
- Most saved penalty kicks in a match: 2
  - (Spain) García Remón v Sporting Gijón, 1975–76 La Liga, 30 November 1975
  - (Spain) Miguel Ángel v Atlético Madrid, 1978–79 La Liga, 26 November 1978
- Most saved penalty kicks in La Liga: 11 – (Spain) Iker Casillas, 1999–2015
- Most saved penalty kicks in Copa del Rey: 2 – (Spain) José Cabo, 1928–1929
- Most saved penalty kicks in Supercopa de España: 1 – (Belgium) Thibaut Courtois, 2018–
- Most saved penalty kicks in European Cup / UEFA Champions League: 3
  - (Spain) Iker Casillas, 1999–2015
  - (Belgium) Thibaut Courtois, 2018–
- Most saved penalty kicks in FIFA Club World Cup: 1 – (Spain) Iker Casillas, 1999–2015
- Goalkeepers that saved penalty kicks in finals:
  - (Spain) José Cabo v Espanyol, 1929 Copa del Rey final, 3 February 1929
  - (Spain) José Araquistáin v Sevilla, 1962 Copa del Generalísimo final, 8 July 1962
  - (Belgium) Thibaut Courtois v Athletic Bilbao, 2022 Supercopa de España final, 16 January 2022
- Youngest goalkeeper to save a penalty kick: 18 years, 299 days – (Spain) Iker Casillas v Dynamo Kyiv, 1999–2000 UEFA Champions League, 14 March 2000
- Oldest goalkeeper to save a penalty kick: 37 years, 359 days – (Spain) Paco Buyo v Mérida, 1995–96 La Liga, 7 January 1996

==== Other goalkeeping records ====
- Goalkeepers that scored against Real Madrid:
  - (Spain) Manuel Balbuena for Huelva Recreation Club, 1907 Copa del Rey, 29 March 1907 (Note: He scored the goal to reduce the deficit after dribbling past the players and scoring the goal.)
  - (Socialist Federal Republic of Yugoslavia) Ognjen Petrović for Red Star Belgrade, 1974–75 European Cup Winners' Cup, 19 March 1975 (Note: Scored from a penalty kick. In the same match, he also scored a penalty shootout kick, eliminating Real Madrid from the competition.)
  - (Argentina) Carlos Fenoy for Celta Vigo, 1976–77 La Liga, 7 November 1977 (Note: Scored after the ball rebounded from a save by goalkeeper Miguel Ángel following a penalty kick.)
  - (Spain) Toni Prats for Real Betis, 1999–2000 La Liga, 25 January 2000 (Note: Scored from a free kick.)
  - (Ukraine) Anatoliy Trubin for Benfica, 2025–26 UEFA Champions League, 28 January 2026 (Note: Scored a second-half stoppage time (eighth minute) goal for Benfica on 28 January 2026, in the last game of the league phase, and qualified his team for the play-offs.)
- Outfield players who acted as goalkeeper: (Note: It does not include players who played in more than one primary position, such as Arthur Johnson, who played as both a forward and a goalkeeper.)
  - (Spain) Jacinto Quincoces v Barcelona, 1940–41 La Liga, 1 December 1940 (Note: On 1 December 1940, during a match between Real Madrid and Barcelona at Camp de Les Corts, Spanish defender Jacinto Quincoces was forced to take over as goalkeeper in the 77th minute after the team's regular keeper, Enrique Esquiva, suffered a back injury following a collision with both Quincoces and Barcelona forward Julián Vergara. With no substitutions allowed at the time, Quincoces stepped into goal for the remainder of the match. Despite being a central defender, he made two notable saves, preventing further goals. The match ended in a 3–0 victory for Barcelona.)
  - (Spain) Sabino Barinaga v Atlético Aviación, 1945–46 La Liga, 16 December 1945 (Note: José Bañón suffered a knee injury caused by José Juncosa, Atlético’s forward, which caused him to lose consciousness, prompting Barinaga to guard Real Madrid’s goal for the remaining seven minutes of the first half. After the break, Bañón returned to his position that day.)
  - (Spain) Macala v Celta Vigo, 1948–49 La Liga, 6 March 1949 (Note: On 6 March 1949, during the match between Real Madrid and Celta Vigo at the Balaídos stadium, José Bañón, Real Madrid’s goalkeeper, sustained a hand injury two minutes before the end of the first half after a collision with Celta Vigo players' feet. He was temporarily replaced by Macala for the remaining two minutes of the half. During halftime, it was confirmed that the goalkeeper had suffered a dislocated hand. Although the backup goalkeeper, Adauto Iglesias, was part of the squad traveling to Vigo, he was unable to participate due to illness. Consequently, coach Michael Keeping decided to deploy Sabino Barinaga as goalkeeper, field José Bañón as a winger, and return Macala to his natural position. This lineup remained unchanged until the end of the match.)
  - (Spain) Sabino Barinaga v Celta Vigo, 1948–49 La Liga, 6 March 1949 (Note: Barinaga is the only outfield player in Real Madrid’s history who has taken the goalkeeper position more than once. Additionally, he is the outfield player who played as goalkeeper for the longest duration with Real Madrid, having played a full half.)
  - (Spain) Ignacio Zoco v Anderlecht, 1962–63 European Cup, 26 September 1962 (Note: In the 27th minute, Real Madrid goalkeeper José Vicente suffered a concussion after a heavy collision with opposing players. Ignacio Zoco took his place for three minutes before Vicente returned to play. During those three minutes, Zoco was not involved in any play.)
  - (Spain) Míchel v Tenerife, 1991–92 La Liga, 26 January 1992 (Note: After Paco Buyo was sent off, Míchel took over as goalkeeper for a few seconds at the end of the match in Real Madrid's 2–1 victory against Tenerife.)
- Goalkeepers who played as outfield players:
  - (Spain) José Bañón v Celta Vigo, 1948–49 La Liga, 6 March 1949

=== Wins ===
==== Most matches won ====
Competitive, professional matches only. Including substitutes. Players in italics are still active outside the club. As of 5 July 2025.

Rank	Player	Years	League	Cup	Europe	Other	Total
1	(Spain) Iker Casillas	1999–2015	334	28	90	11	463
2	(France) Karim Benzema	2009–2023	309	28	85	18	440
3	(Spain) Sergio Ramos	2005–2021	315	29	79	14	437
4	(Spain) Raúl	1994–2010	327	19	74	9	429
5	(Spain) Manolo Sanchís	1983–2001	312	35	56	9	412
6	(Croatia) Luka Modrić	2012–2025	266	19	84	25	394
7	(Spain) Paco Gento	1953–1971	283	44	58	5	390
8	(Brazil) Marcelo	2007–2022	265	24	67	16	372
9	(Spain) Santillana	1971–1988	262	44	52	5	363
10	(Spain) Fernando Hierro	1989–2003	251	25	62	11	349

==== By competition ====
- Most wins in La Liga: 334 – (Spain) Iker Casillas
- Most wins in Copa del Rey: 44
  - (Spain) Paco Gento
  - (Spain) Santillana
- Most wins in Copa de la Liga: 4
  - (Spain) Francisco Pineda
  - (Spain) Camacho
  - (Germany) Uli Stielike
  - (Spain) Isidoro San José
  - (Spain) Ricardo Gallego
  - (Spain) Santillana
- Most wins in Supercopa de España: 7
  - (Germany) Toni Kroos
  - (Croatia) Luka Modrić
  - (Uruguay) Federico Valverde
- Most wins in international competitions: 97 – (Spain) Iker Casillas
- Most wins in UEFA club competitions: 93 – (Spain) Iker Casillas
- Most wins in European competitions: 92 – (Spain) Iker Casillas
- Most wins in UEFA Champions League: 90 – (Spain) Iker Casillas
- Most wins in European Cup Winners' Cup: 9 – (Spain) Camacho
- Most wins in UEFA Cup: 26 – (Spain) Míchel
- Most wins in UEFA Super Cup: 5
  - (Spain) Dani Carvajal
  - (Croatia) Luka Modrić
- Most wins in Intercontinental Cup: 2
  - (Spain) Fernando Hierro
  - (Spain) Raúl
  - (Brazil) Roberto Carlos
- Most wins in FIFA Club World Cup: 12 – (Croatia) Luka Modrić
- Most wins in FIFA Intercontinental Cup: 1 – 16 players

==== Consecutive ====
- Most consecutive matches won: 21 – (Brazil) Marcelo, 16 September 2014 – 20 December 2014
- Most consecutive matches won in La Liga: 18
  - (Hungary) (Spain) Ferenc Puskás, 23 October 1960 – 12 March 1961
  - (Spain) Luis del Sol, 23 October 1960 – 12 March 1961
- Most consecutive unbeaten matches: 44 – (Spain) Lucas Vázquez, 27 September 2023 – 22 October 2024
- Most consecutive unbeaten matches in La Liga: 50 – (Spain) Emilio Butragueño, 21 February 1988 – 1 October 1989

==== Titles ====
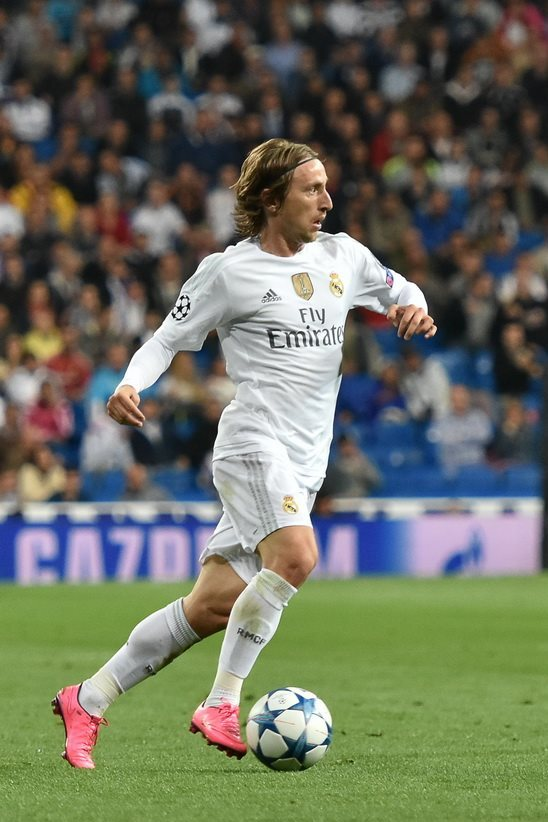
Luka Modrić is the club's most decorated player with 28 major trophies.

- Most major trophies at Real Madrid: 28 – (Croatia) Luka Modrić, 2012–2025
- Most La Liga titles: 12 – (Spain) Paco Gento, 1953–1971 ^{(Spanish record)}
- Most Copa del Rey titles: 5
  - (Spain) Miguel Ángel, 1968–1986
  - (Spain) Camacho, 1973–1989
- Most Supercopa de España titles: 5
  - (Spain) Chendo, 1983–2001
  - (Spain) Manolo Sanchís, 1983–2001
  - (Brazil) Marcelo, 2007–2022
  - (Spain) Nacho, 2010–2024
  - (Croatia) Luka Modrić, 2012–2025
- Most European Cup / UEFA Champions League titles: 6 ^{(European record)}
  - (Spain) Paco Gento, 1953–1971
  - (Spain) Nacho, 2010–2024
  - (Croatia) Luka Modrić, 2012–2025
  - (Spain) Dani Carvajal, 2013–2026
- Most UEFA Super Cup titles: 5 ^{(European record)}
  - (Croatia) Luka Modrić, 2012–2025
  - (Spain) Dani Carvajal, 2013–2026
- Most FIFA Club World Cup titles: 5 ^{(World record)}
  - (Spain) Nacho, 2010–2024
  - (Croatia) Luka Modrić, 2012–2025
  - (Spain) Dani Carvajal, 2013–2026
  - (Germany) Toni Kroos, 2014–2024
- Most Intercontinental Cup titles: 2 ^{(Shared record)}
  - (Spain) Fernando Hierro, 1989–2003
  - (Spain) Raúl, 1994–2010
  - (Spain) Fernando Morientes, 1997–2005
  - (Spain) Guti, 1995–2010
  - (Brazil) Roberto Carlos, 1996–2007

=== Disciplinary ===
Notes: Includes only cards given to players who are still on the field during match time; it does not include cards given to substitutes, manager, technical staff, or players after the end of the match.
- Most yellow cards: 252 – (Spain) Sergio Ramos, 2005–2021
- Most red cards: 26 – (Spain) Sergio Ramos, 2005–2021
- Most yellow cards in a season: 22 – (Spain) Sergio Ramos, 2014–15
- Most red cards in a season: 4
  - (Spain) Guti, 1999–2000
  - (Spain) Sergio Ramos, 2005–06
- Fastest yellow card: 25 seconds – (Croatia) Robert Jarni v Dynamo Kyiv, 1998–99 UEFA Champions League, 17 March 1999
- Fastest red card: 1 minute and 27 seconds – (Spain) Iker Casillas v Espanyol, 2010–11 La Liga, 13 February 2011
- Fastest red card for a substitute: 1 minute – (Spain) García Hernández v Hercules, 1979–80 La Liga, 30 March 1980
- Most yellow cards in a match: 8 – Real Madrid 1–0 (Spain) Sevilla, 2010–11 La Liga, 19 December 2010; Casillas, Ramos, Carvalho, Pepe, Özil, Di María, Lass Diarra and Pedro León
- Most red cards in a match: 3
  - Real Madrid 0–5 (West Germany) 1. FC Kaiserslautern, 1981–82 UEFA Cup, 17 March 1982; San José, Cunningham and Pineda
  - Real Madrid 0–2 (Spain) Sevilla, 1992–93 La Liga, 19 December 1992; Rocha, Míchel and Prosinečki
  - Real Madrid 0–3 (Spain) Tenerife, 1993–94 Copa del Rey, 1 February 1994; Milla, Zamorano and Sanchís
  - Real Madrid 3–2 (Morocco) Raja Casablanca, 2000 FIFA Club World Championship, 10 January 2000; Roberto Carlos, Guti and Karembeu
- Shortest time between two consecutive yellow cards for the same player (sent off after second yellow card): 10 seconds – (Argentina) Ángel Di María v Deportivo La Coruña, 2012–13 La Liga, 23 February 2013

=== Captaincy ===
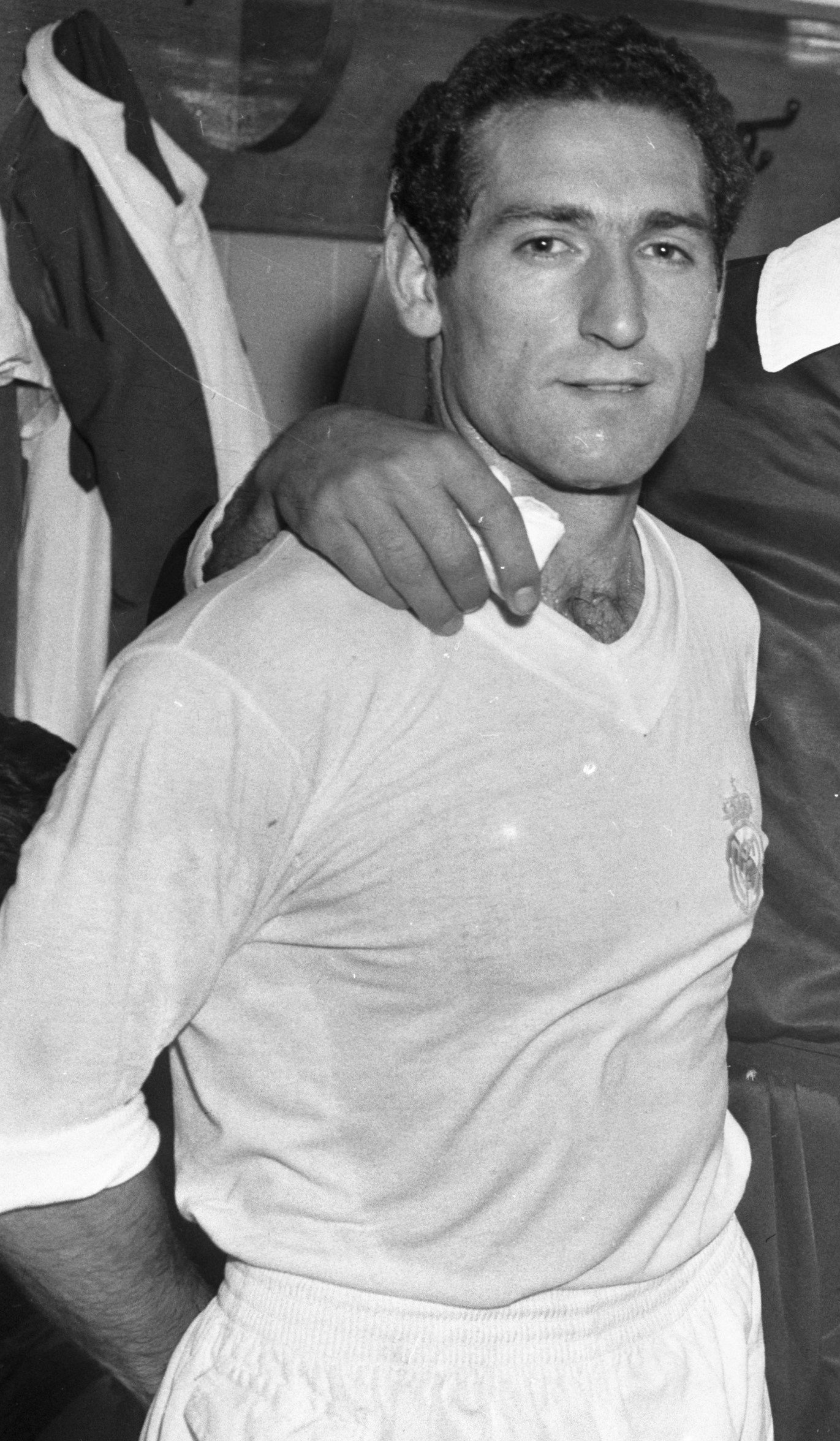
Paco Gento is the longest-serving captain in the club's history.

- Total number of club captains – 40 players (Note: Other players (vice-captains) have led the team on the pitch when the club captain was not playing.)
- Most matches started as captain: 307 – (Spain) Raúl, 1999–2010
- Most titles as captain: 12 – (Spain) Sergio Ramos, 2015–2021
- Longest serving captain: 9 seasons – (Spain) Paco Gento, 1962–1971
- Shortest serving captains: 1 season – 14 players
- First club captain – (Spain) Julián Palacios (Note: He only played for a few friendlies because he later hung up his boots to become fully involved in the management of the club.)
- First official club captain – (Ireland) Arthur Johnson v Barcelona, 1902 Copa de la Coronación, 13 May 1902
- Youngest starting captain: 19 years, 239 days – (Cuba) José Giralt v Espanyol, 1903 Copa del Rey, 6 April 1903
- Oldest starting captain: 39 years, 257 days – (Croatia) Luka Modrić v Real Sociedad, 2024–25 La Liga, 24 May 2025

=== Personal records ===
Note: It is required that players have participated in at least one official match in order to be included in the following lists. Appearances in friendly or regional tournaments are not counted, nor are players who joined Real Madrid without making any appearance.

- Tallest player: 200 cm – (Belgium) Thibaut Courtois, 2018–
- Shortest player: 165 cm
  - (Spain) Miguel Pardeza, 1984–1987
  - (Spain) Manolín Bueno, 1959–1971
- Longest-lived Real Madrid player: 100 years, 61 days – (Spain) Pablo Hernández, 11 September 1897 – 11 November 1997
- Shortest-lived Real Madrid player: 24 years, 257 days – (Spain) Chus Herrera, 5 February 1938 – 20 October 1962
- Oldest-living former Real Madrid player: 94 years, 338 days – (Spain) José Vicente, born on 19 December 1931 (Note: José Vicente is the oldest former player whose survival has been verified. Other players, such as Manuel Rocha and Pelayo Camino, have neither been confirmed to be alive nor documented as deceased, as no reliable information about their current status is available.)
- Earliest-appearing living Real Madrid player: 72 years, 71 days – (Spain) Mario Duran v Valencia, 1954–55 La Liga, 12 September 1954

=== Other records ===
- Player with most finals at Real Madrid: 28 – (Croatia) Luka Modrić, 2012–2025
- Most matches drawn: 150 – (Spain) Manolo Sanchís, 1983–2001
- Most matches lost: 168 – (Spain) Raúl, 1994–2010
- Most outfield player appearances, never score: 170 – (Spain) Pedro de Felipe, 1964–1972
- Most appearances, never won a trophy: 143 – (Spain) Pahiño, 1948–1953
- Most appearances, never won a match: 6 – (Spain) Juan Manzanedo, 1916–1926
- Most appearances, never lost a match: 17 – (Portugal) Carlos Secretário, 1996–1997
- Most appearances, always won a match: 10 – (Turkey) Nuri Şahin, 2011–2012
- Most appearances, always lost a match: 3
  - (Spain) Luis Méndez-Vigo, 1935–1940
  - (Spain) Antonio Gento, 1961–1962

=== Internationals ===
- First international appearance by a Real Madrid player: Juan Monjardín, Spain v Portugal, 17 December 1922
- First international goal by a Real Madrid player: Juan Monjardín, Spain v Portugal, 17 December 1922
- First international appearance by a Real Madrid non-Spanish player: Raymond Kopa, France v Paraguay, 8 June 1958
- First international appearance by a non-Spanish player to have played for Real Madrid: Fernando Giudicelli, Brazil v Yugoslavia, 14 July 1930 (he later joined Real Madrid in 1935)
- Most international caps as a Real Madrid player: 176 – Sergio Ramos, Spain
- Most capped player to play for Real Madrid: 234 – Cristiano Ronaldo, Portugal (89 caps whilst at Real Madrid)
- Most international goals as a Real Madrid player: 63 – Cristiano Ronaldo, Portugal
- Most international goals by a player who played for Real Madrid: 146 – Cristiano Ronaldo, Portugal (63 goals whilst at Real Madrid)

==== FIFA World Cup ====
- First Real Madrid player to appear at a World Cup: Ciriaco Errasti, Hilario, Jacinto Quincoces, Luis Regueiro and Ricardo Zamora for Spain, at 1934 FIFA World Cup
- First non-Spanish player to appear at a World Cup: Raymond Kopa for France, at 1958 FIFA World Cup
- Most World Cup appearances while a Real Madrid player: Roberto Carlos for Brazil and Iker Casillas for Spain, with 17 each
- Most World Cup goals while a Real Madrid player: Kylian Mbappé, 10 for France in 2026
- Most goals by Real Madrid players in a tournament: 22 – 2026 ^{(Record)}
- Below is the list of players who have won the FIFA World Cup as Real Madrid players:
  - Günter Netzer (West Germany 1974)
  - (Argentina) Jorge Valdano (Mexico 1986)
  - Christian Karembeu (France 1998)
  - (Brazil) Roberto Carlos (South Korea/Japan 2002)
  - (Spain) Iker Casillas (South Africa 2010)
  - (Spain) Raúl Albiol (South Africa 2010)
  - (Spain) Xabi Alonso (South Africa 2010)
  - (Spain) Sergio Ramos (South Africa 2010)
  - (Spain) Alvaro Arbeloa (South Africa 2010)
  - (Germany) Sami Khedira (Brazil 2014)
  - (France) Raphaël Varane (Russia 2018)

==== UEFA European Championship ====
- First Real Madrid player to appear at a European Championship: Ignacio Zoco and Amancio for Spain, at 1964 European Nations' Cup
- First non-Spanish player to appear at a European Championship: Uli Stielike for West Germany, at 1980 European Nations' Cup
- Most European Championship appearances while a Real Madrid player: Iker Casillas, 14 for Spain in 2004, 2008 and 2012
- Most European Championship goals while a Real Madrid player: Cristiano Ronaldo, 6 for Portugal in 2012 and 2016
- Below is the list of players who have won the UEFA European Championship as Real Madrid players:
  - Ignacio Zoco (Spain 1964)
  - Amancio (Spain 1964)
  - (Germany) Uli Stielike (Italy 1980)
  - (France) Christian Karembeu (Belgium & Netherlands 2000)
  - (France) Nicolas Anelka (Belgium & Netherlands 2000)
  - (Spain) Rubén de la Red (Austria & Switzerland 2008)
  - (Spain) Iker Casillas (Austria & Switzerland 2008 and Poland & Ukraine 2012)
  - (Spain) Sergio Ramos (Austria & Switzerland 2008 and Poland & Ukraine 2012)
  - (Spain) Raúl Albiol (Poland & Ukraine 2012)
  - (Spain) Álvaro Arbeloa (Poland & Ukraine 2012)
  - (Spain) Xabi Alonso (Poland & Ukraine 2012)
  - (Portugal) Pepe (France 2016)
  - (Portugal) Cristiano Ronaldo (France 2016)
  - (Spain) Nacho (Germany 2024)
  - (Spain) Dani Carvajal (Germany 2024)
  - (Spain) Joselu (Germany 2024)

==== FIFA Confederations Cup ====
- Below is the list of players who have won the FIFA Confederations Cup as Real Madrid players.
  - (Denmark) Michael Laudrup (Saudi Arabia 1995)
  - (Brazil) Roberto Carlos (Saudi Arabia 1997)
  - (Brazil) Zé Roberto (Saudi Arabia 1997)
  - Marcelo (Brazil 2013)

==== UEFA Nations League ====
- Below is the list of players who have won the UEFA Nations League as Real Madrid players:
  - (France) Karim Benzema (Italy 2021)
  - (Spain) Dani Carvajal (Netherlands 2023)
  - (Spain) Marco Asensio (Netherlands 2023)
  - (Spain) Nacho (Netherlands 2023)

==== Copa América ====
- Below is the list of players who have won the Copa América as Real Madrid players.
  - (Brazil) Roberto Carlos (Bolivia 1997 and Paraguay 1999)
  - (Brazil) Zé Roberto (Bolivia 1997)
  - (Brazil) Júlio Baptista (Paraguay 2007)
  - (Brazil) Robinho (Paraguay 2007)
  - Casemiro (Brazil 2019)
  - Éder Militão (Brazil 2019)

==== Africa Cup of Nations ====
- Below is the list of players who have won the Africa Cup of Nations as Real Madrid players.
  - (Cameroon) Geremi (Ghana & Nigeria 2000 and Mali 2002)
  - (Cameroon) Samuel Eto'o (Ghana & Nigeria 2000)
  - Brahim Díaz (Morocco 2025) (Note: The final match originally finished 1–0 for Senegal after extra time. On 17 March 2026, the CAF Appeal Board ruled that Senegal had forfeited the match for temporarily refusing to play and leaving the pitch in protest of a refereeing decision. Pursuant to articles 82 and 84 of the competition regulations, the final was awarded as a 3–0 win for Morocco, thereby retroactively declaring them as 2025 Africa Cup of Nations champions and stripping Senegal of the title.)

=== Transfers ===
==== Highest transfer fees paid ====
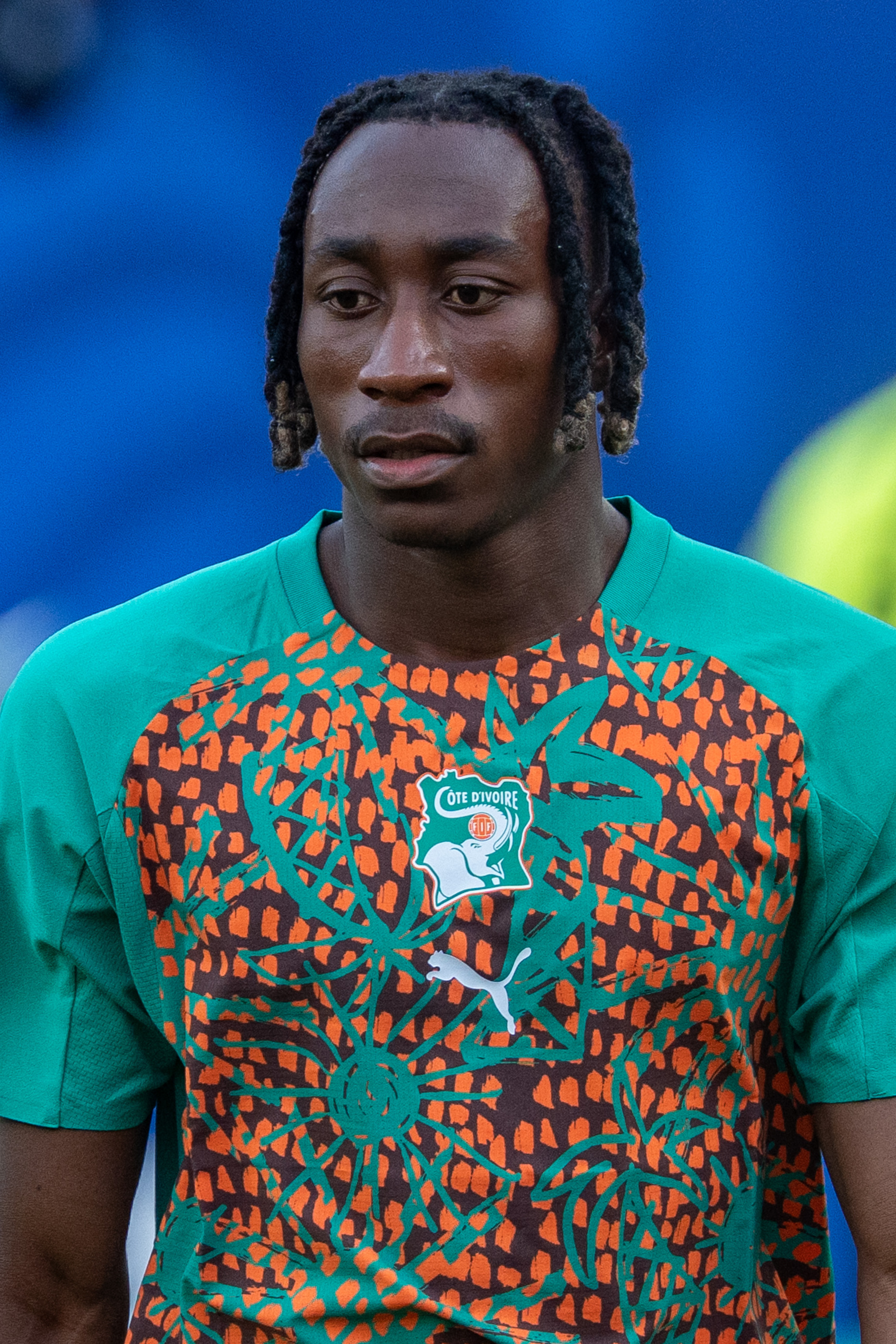
Yan Diomande, signed in August 2026 from RB Leipzig for €125 million, became Real Madrid's most expensive purchase.

Rank	Player	From	Transfer fee (£ millions)	Transfer fee (€ millions)	Date	Ref.
1	(Ivory Coast) Yan Diomande	(Germany) RB Leipzig	£107.1	€125 (Note: Initial €125 million plus reported €15 million bonuses)	2026	
2	(England) Jude Bellingham	(Germany) Borussia Dortmund	£88.5	€103 (Note: Initial €103 million plus reported €30.9 million bonuses)	2023	
3	(Belgium) Eden Hazard	(England) Chelsea	£89 (Note: Initial £89 million plus reported £60 million bonuses)	€100	2019	
4	(Wales) Gareth Bale	(England) Tottenham Hotspur	£86	€100	2013	
5	(Portugal) Cristiano Ronaldo	(England) Manchester United	£80	€94	2009	
6	(France) Aurélien Tchouaméni	(France) Monaco	£69.4	€80 (Note: Initial €80 million plus reported €20 million bonuses)	2022	
7	(France) Zinedine Zidane	(Italy) Juventus	£46.6	€76 (Note: Fee originally in 150 billion lire; the fixed exchange rate between euro and lire was 1:1936.27)	2001	
8	(Colombia) James Rodríguez	(France) Monaco	£63	€75	2014	
9	(Brazil) Kaká	(Italy) Milan	£56	€67	2009	
10	(Portugal) Luís Figo	(Spain) Barcelona	£37	€62	2000	

==== Highest transfer fees received ====
Cristiano Ronaldo's transfer to Juventus in 2018 remains the club's record sale. Ronaldo was also their record transfer at the time of his move to Madrid in 2009.

Rank	Player	To	Transfer fee (£ millions)	Transfer fee (€ millions)	Date	Ref.
1	(Portugal) Cristiano Ronaldo	(Italy) Juventus	£100	€117	July 2018	
2	(Argentina) Ángel Di María	(England) Manchester United	£59.7	€75.6	August 2014	
3	(Brazil) Casemiro	(England) Manchester United	£60	€70	August 2022	
4	(Spain) Álvaro Morata	(England) Chelsea	£58	€65.5	July 2017	
5	(Germany) Mesut Özil	(England) Arsenal	£42.5	€50	September 2013	
6	(Croatia) Mateo Kovačić	(England) Chelsea	£40.3	€45	July 2019	
7	(Brazil) Robinho	(England) Manchester City	£32.5	€42	September 2008	
8	(Morocco) Achraf Hakimi	(Italy) Inter Milan	£36.3	€41	July 2020	
9	(Argentina) Gonzalo Higuaín	(Italy) Napoli	£34.5	€40	July 2013	
9	(France) Raphaël Varane	(England) Manchester United	£34	€40	August 2021	

== Managers ==
=== Appearances ===
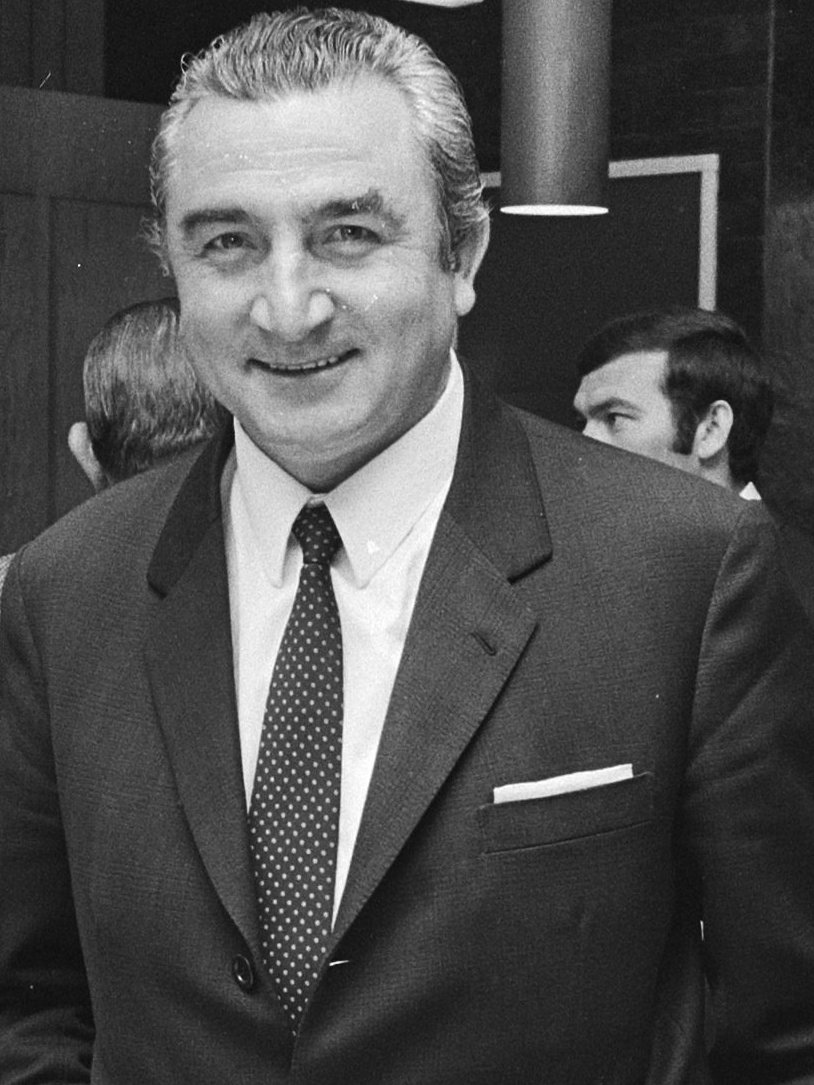
Miguel Muñoz is the manager who has coached the most matches in the history of Real Madrid.

Competitive, professional matches only. Bold indicates manager is still active at club level. As of 21 November 2026.

Rank	Manager	Years	League	Cup	Europe^{[A]}	Other^{[B]}	Total
1	(Spain) Miguel Muñoz	1959, 1960–1974	424	90	87	4	605
2	(Italy) Carlo Ancelotti	2013–2015; 2021–2025	228	30	77	18	353
3	(France) Zinedine Zidane	2016–2018; 2019–2021	183	16	53	11	263
4	(Spain) Vicente del Bosque	1994, 1996; 1999–2003	153	22	61	10	246
5	(Netherlands) Leo Beenhakker	1986–1989, 1992	139	28	28	2	197
6	(Portugal) **José Mourinho**	2010–2013; 2026–present	127	24	40	4	195
7	(Spain) Luis Molowny	1974, 1977–1979; 1982, 1985–1986	122	34	19	8	183
8	(Socialist Federal Republic of Yugoslavia) Vujadin Boškov	1979–1982	98	16	25	0	139
9	(Socialist Federal Republic of Yugoslavia) Miljan Miljanić	1974–1977	103	13	18	0	134
10	(Argentina) (Colombia) (Spain) Alfredo Di Stéfano	1982–1984; 1990–1991	83	21	13	12	129

=== Most wins ===
Competitive, professional matches only. Bold indicates manager is still active at club level. As of 21 November 2026.

Rank	Manager	Years	League	Cup	Europe^{[A]}	Other^{[B]}	Total
1	(Spain) Miguel Muñoz	1959, 1960–1974	257	51	48	1	**357**
2	(Italy) Carlo Ancelotti	2013–2015; 2021–2025	162	22	53	13	**250**
3	(France) Zinedine Zidane	2016–2018; 2019–2021	124	8	31	9	**172**
4	(Portugal) **José Mourinho**	2010–2013; 2026–present	98	16	28	1	**143**
5	(Spain) Vicente del Bosque	1994, 1996; 1999–2003	84	10	34	5	**133**

=== Oldest and youngest ===
- Youngest manager: **25 years, 124 days** – (Hungary) Lippo Hertzka v Arenas de Getxo, 1929–30 La Liga, 23 March 1930
- Oldest manager: **65 years, 348 days** – (Italy) Carlo Ancelotti v Real Sociedad, 2024–25 La Liga, 24 May 2025
- Youngest manager to win a title: **27 years, 136 days** – (Hungary) Lippo Hertzka, 1931–32 La Liga, 3 April 1932
- Oldest manager to win a title: **65 years, 191 days** – (Italy) Carlo Ancelotti, 2024 FIFA Intercontinental Cup, 18 December 2024

=== Others ===
- First full-time manager: (Ireland) Arthur Johnson
- Most years as manager: **15 years** – (Spain) Miguel Muñoz (1959, 1960–1974)
- Most consecutive seasons managed: **14 seasons** – (Spain) Miguel Muñoz (1960–1974)
- Most titles won as manager: **15** – (Italy) Carlo Ancelotti (2013–2015, 2021–2025)
- Most titles in a season: **4** – (France) Zinedine Zidane (2016–17 and 2017–18)
- Most winning percentage: **75%** – (Chile) Manuel Pellegrini (2009–2010) (Note: 36 wins in 48 matches)
- Most goals scored under manager: **1,225** – (Spain) Miguel Muñoz
- Longest time between consecutive matches by a manager: **13 years, 82 days** – (Portugal) José Mourinho, 1 June 2013 – 22 August 2026

== Team records ==
=== Matches ===
==== Firsts ====
- First competitive match: 1–3 v Barcelona, 1902 Copa de la Coronación (semi-finals), 13 May 1902
- First Copa del Rey match: 4–1 v Espanyol, 1903 Copa del Rey (semi-finals), 6 April 1903
- First La Liga match: 5–0 v CE Europa, 1929 La Liga, 10 February 1929
- First match at Santiago Bernabéu: 3–1 v Belenenses, 14 December 1947
- First competitive match at Santiago Bernabéu: 3–1 v Espanyol, 1947–48 La Liga, 18 December 1947
- First Copa Eva Duarte (and only) match: 3–1 v Valencia, 1947 Copa Eva Duarte, 8 June 1948
- First Small Club World Cup match: 3–2 v La Salle, 1952 Small Club World Cup (group stage), 13 July 1952
- First Latin Cup match: 2–0 v Belenenses, 1955 Latin Cup (semi-finals), 22 May 1955
- First European Cup match: 2–0 v Servette, 1955–56 European Cup (round 1 – first leg), 8 September 1955
- First Intercontinental Cup match: 0–0 v Peñarol, 1960 Intercontinental Cup (first leg), 3 July 1960
- First European Cup Winners' Cup match: 0–0 v Hibernian, 1970–71 European Cup Winners' Cup (round 1 – first leg), 17 September 1970
- First UEFA Cup match: 2–1 v Basel, 1971–72 UEFA Cup (round 1 – first leg), 15 September 1971
- First Supercopa de España match: 1–0 v Real Sociedad, 1982 Supercopa de España (first leg), 13 October 1982
- First Copa de la Liga match: 1–0 v Real Sociedad, 1983 Copa de la Liga (quarter-finals), 12 June 1983
- First Copa Iberoamericana match: 3–1 v Boca Juniors, 1994 Copa Iberoamericana (first leg), 19 May 1994
- First UEFA Champions League match: 0–1 v Ajax, 1995–96 UEFA Champions League (group stage), 13 September 1995
- First UEFA Super Cup match: 0–1 v Chelsea, 1998 UEFA Super Cup, 28 August 1998
- First FIFA Club World Cup match: 3–1 v Al-Nassr, 2000 FIFA Club World Championship (group stage), 5 January 2000
- First FIFA Intercontinental Cup match: 3–0 v Pachuca, 2024 FIFA Intercontinental Cup (final), 18 December 2024

==== In a season ====
- Most matches played in a season: 68 matches – 2024–25 ^{(Spanish record)}
- Fewest matches played in a season: 0 matches – 1911–12 (Note: All the matches played by the team this season were friendly matches. This was the only season in which Real Madrid did not participate in any official or regional match at all.) ^{(Shared record)}
- Most matches won in a season: 46 matches – 2011–12 and 2013–14
- Most matches won in a season in La Liga: 32 matches – 2011–12 ^{(Shared record)}
  - Most league home wins in a season: 18 matches – 1987–88 and 2009–10 ^{(Shared record)}
  - Most league away wins in a season: 16 matches – 2011–12 ^{(Spanish record)}
- Fewest official matches won in a season in La Liga: 7 matches – 1929–30
- Most matches drawn in a season: 21 matches – 1999–2000 ^{(Shared record)}
- Most matches drawn in a season in La Liga: 15 matches – 1978–79
- Fewest matches drawn in a season in La Liga: 1
  - 1929, in 18 matches
  - 1934–35, in 22 matches
  - 1939–40, in 22 matches
- Most matches lost in a season: 19 matches – 1984–85
- Most matches lost in a season in La Liga: 13 matches – 1973–74
- Fewest matches lost in a season: 1 match – 1931–32 ^{(Spanish record)}
- Fewest matches lost in a season in La Liga: 0 – 1931–32 ^{(Shared record)}
- Most unbeaten matches in a season: 54 matches – 2016–17
- Most unbeaten matches in a season in La Liga: 39 matches – 1986–87, out of 44 matches ^{(Shared record)}

==== Record wins ====
- Record win: 11–1 against Barcelona (in 1943 Copa del Generalísimo)
- Record league win: 11–2 against Elche (in 1959–60 La Liga)
- Record Spanish cup win: 11–1 against Barcelona (in 1943 Copa del Generalísimo)
- Record European win: 9–0 against B 1913 (in 1961–62 European Cup)
- Record home win: 11–1 against Barcelona (in 1943 Copa del Generalísimo)
- Record away win: 8–0 against Olympiakos Nicosia (in 1969–70 European Cup)
  - This match was held at the Santiago Bernabéu Stadium because Olympiakos Nicosia’s stadium did not meet UEFA requirements, and Real Madrid were considered the away team rather than the hosts, and with the exception of this rare case, the record away win:
    - 7–0 against Valdepeñas (in 1977–78 Copa del Rey)
    - 7–0 against Progrès Niederkorn (in 1978–79 European Cup)
    - 8–1 against San Sebastián (in 2002–03 Copa del Rey)
- Record home league win: 11–2 against Elche (in 1959–60 La Liga)
- Record away league win:
  - 6–0 against Real Zaragoza (in 2011–12 La Liga)
  - 7–1 against Real Zaragoza (in 1987–88 La Liga)
  - 8–2 against Deportivo La Coruña (in 2014–15 La Liga)

==== Record defeats ====
- Record league defeat: 1–8 against Español (in 1929–30 La Liga)
- Record Spanish cup defeat: 0–6 against Valencia (in 1998–99 Copa del Rey)
- Record European defeat:
  - 0–5 against 1. FC Kaiserslautern (in 1981–82 UEFA Cup)
  - 0–5 against Milan (in 1988–89 European Cup)
- Record home defeat: 0–6 against Athletic Bilbao (in 1930–31 La Liga)
- Record away defeat: 1–8 against Español (in 1929–30 La Liga)

==== Matches time ====
- Shortest match: 6 minutes, against Real Sociedad, 2004–05 La Liga, 5 January 2005 (Note: The match began on 12 December 2004, and continued until the 88th minute when a false bomb threat forced the referee to suspend the game with the score at 1–1. Later, after 24 days, the remaining six minutes, including four minutes of added time, were resumed on 5 January 2005. Zinedine Zidane scored a penalty just four minutes into the restart.)
- Longest match: 149 minutes, against Real Betis, 1965–66 Copa del Rey, 15 May 1966 (Note: The minutes were distributed as follows: ninety minutes of regular time, thirty minutes of the first extra period, two additional periods of ten minutes each, and nine minutes of the fourth extra period, which ended with Real Betis’ decisive goal.)

=== Streaks ===
==== Winning runs ====
- Longest winning run in all competitions: 22, 16 September 2014 – 20 December 2014 ^{(Spanish record)}
- Longest league winning run: 16, 2 March 2016 – 18 September 2016 ^{(Shared record)}
- Longest winning run in Copa del Rey: 10, 18 December 2013 – 2 December 2014
- Most home wins in a row (all competitions): 28, 2 June 1985 – 30 April 1986
- Most away wins in a row (all competitions): 12
  - 2 October 2011 – 14 January 2012
  - 20 September 2014 – 12 December 2014 (Note: Does not include the win over Cruz Azul in the semi-finals of the FIFA Club World Cup on 16 December 2014, as it was technically a neutral venue.)
- Most home league wins in a row: 24, 3 December 1988 – 28 January 1990
- Most away league wins in a row: 13, 26 February 2017 – 14 October 2017 ^{(Spanish record)}
- Longest league winning run from the first match of season: 9, 15 September 1968 – 16 November 1968 ^{(Shared record)}

===== UEFA competitions =====
- Longest winning run in UEFA competitions: 11, 23 April 2014 – 18 February 2015
- Longest winning run in UEFA Champions League: 10, 23 April 2014 – 18 February 2015
- Most UEFA Champions League home wins in a row: 17
  - 12 October 1955 – 21 April 1960 (Note: Does not include the first five finals that Real Madrid won between 1956 and 1960, including the 1957 final against Fiorentina, which was held at the Santiago Bernabéu, as it was technically a neutral venue.)
  - 13 September 1978 – 16 March 1988
- Most UEFA Champions League away wins in a row: 5, 29 April 2014 – 18 February 2015

==== Unbeaten runs ====
- Longest unbeaten run (all competitions): 40, 9 April 2016 – 12 January 2017 ^{(Spanish record)}
- Longest unbeaten home run (all competitions): 83, 8 May 1977 – 18 January 1981 (Note: Does not include the win in the 1980 Copa del Rey final, although despite the victory against their own reserve team, Real Madrid Castilla, at the Santiago Bernabéu, the match was technically a neutral venue.) ^{(Spanish record)}
- Longest unbeaten away run (all competitions): 21, 21 September 2011 – 11 April 2012 ^{(Spanish record)}
- Longest league unbeaten run: 42, 27 September 2023 – 19 October 2024
- Longest league unbeaten home run: 121, 17 February 1957 – 20 February 1965 ^{(Spanish record)}
- Longest league unbeaten away run: 21, 30 September 2023 – 24 November 2024

===== UEFA competitions =====
- Longest unbeaten run in UEFA Competitions: 16, 12 April 2016 – 2 May 2017
- Longest unbeaten run in the UEFA Champions League: 15, 12 April 2016 – 2 May 2017
- Longest unbeaten home run in the UEFA Champions League: 32, 17 September 1975 – 24 October 1990
- Longest unbeaten away run in the UEFA Champions League: 11, 28 September 2010 – 27 March 2012

==== Winless runs ====
- Longest winless run: 9
  - 23 December 1984 – 17 February 1985
  - 27 February 1991 – 7 April 1991
- Longest home winless run: 5, 13 November 1949 – 5 February 1950
- Longest away winless run: 17, 22 November 1997 – 9 May 1998
- Longest league winless run: 9, 23 December 1984 – 17 February 1985
- Longest winless run in the UEFA Champions League: 6, 2 October 2002 – 11 December 2002
- Longest winless run in the UEFA Champions League (home matches): 3
  - 29 February 2000 – 4 April 2000
  - 22 October 2002 – 11 December 2002

==== Draws ====
- Most draws in a row: 5
  - 29 March 1970 – 3 May 1970
  - 7 January 1979 – 24 January 1979
- Most home draws in a row: 5, 13 November 1949 – 5 February 1950
- Most away draws in a row: 5
  - 6 December 1953 – 7 February 1954
  - 8 March 2006 – 16 April 2006
- Most league draws in a row: 4
  - 21 September 1947 – 12 October 1947
  - 2 March 1969 – 23 March 1969
  - 29 March 1970 – 19 April 1970
  - 17 February 2007 – 10 March 2007

==== Matches without draw ====
- Most consecutive matches without draw: 33, 29 March 1922 – 26 February 1928 ^{(Shared record)}
- Most consecutive matches without draw in La Liga: 32, 26 October 1952 – 1 November 1953 ^{(Shared record)}

==== Losses ====
- Most defeats in a row: 5
  - 3 April 1985 – 21 April 1985
  - 25 April 2004 – 23 May 2004
  - 2 May 2009 – 31 May 2009
- Most home defeats in a row: 4
  - 18 June 1995 – 17 September 1995
  - 11 April 2004 – 23 May 2004
  - 17 February 2019 – 5 March 2019
- Most away defeats in a row: 7
  - 26 October 1947 – 25 January 1947
  - 3 December 1950 – 18 March 1951
- Most league defeats in a row: 5
  - 25 April 2004 – 23 May 2004
  - 2 May 2009 – 31 May 2009

==== Scoring ====
- Longest scoring run: 73, 30 April 2016 – 17 September 2017 ^{(Spanish record)}
- Longest league scoring run: 54, 2 March 2016 – 17 September 2017
- Longest home league scoring run: 81, 11 November 1951 – 20 January 1957
- Longest away league scoring run: 35, 3 January 2016 – 29 October 2017 ^{(Spanish record)}

==== Non-scoring ====
- Longest non-scoring run: 5, 3 April 1985 – 21 April 1985
- Longest league non-scoring run: 3
  - 7 April 1985 – 21 April 1985
  - 17 September 1993 – 2 October 1993
  - 27 April 2002 – 10 May 2002
  - 26 September 2018 – 6 October 2018

=== Goals ===
==== In a match ====
- Most goals by Real Madrid in a match: 11
  - Real Madrid 11–1 Barcelona, 1943 Copa del Generalísimo, 13 June 1943
  - Real Madrid 11–2 Elche, 1959–60 La Liga, 7 February 1960
- Most goals in a match (both teams): 13
  - Real Madrid 9–4 Extremeño, 1927 Copa del Rey, 6 March 1927
  - Real Madrid 11–2 Elche, 1959–60 La Liga, 7 February 1960
- Most goals scored by Real Madrid in a losing match: 4
  - Real Madrid 4–5 Real Sociedad, 1929 La Liga, 19 May 1929
  - Real Madrid 4–5 Espanyol, 1939–40 La Liga, 3 March 1940
  - Real Madrid 4–5 Sevilla, 1940–41 La Liga, 9 February 1941
- Most goals scored by Real Madrid in a drawn match: 6 – Real Madrid 6–6 Barcelona, 1916 Copa del Rey, 13 April 1916

The following table shows the most goals scored in a single match in Real Madrid’s history:

Goals	Result	Date	Competition
13	Real Madrid 9–4 CD Extremeño	6 March 1927	Copa del Rey
13	Real Madrid 11–2 Elche	7 February 1960	La Liga
12	Real Madrid 6–6 Barcelona	13 April 1916	Copa del Rey
12	Real Madrid 11–1 Barcelona	13 June 1943	Copa del Rey
12	Real Madrid 10–2 Rayo Vallecano	20 December 2015	La Liga
11	Real Madrid 7–4 Castellón	2 February 1947	La Liga
11	Real Madrid 8–3 Celta Vigo	15 January 1956	La Liga
11	Real Madrid 10–1 Las Palmas	4 January 1959	La Liga
10	Madrid-Moderno (Note: Real Madrid played this match under the name Madrid-Moderno, a merger between Madrid FC and Moderno.) 5–5 Español Madrid	19 March 1904	Copa del Rey
10	Real Madrid 8–2 Barcelona	3 February 1935	La Liga
10	Real Madrid 9–1 CD Castellón	16 November 1941	La Liga
10	Real Madrid 6–4 Real Sociedad	4 January 1942	La Liga
10	Barcelona 5–5 Real Madrid	10 January 1943	La Liga
10	Real Madrid 7–3 Eintracht Frankfurt	18 May 1960	European Cup
10	Real Madrid 9–1 Real Sociedad	16 September 1967	La Liga
10	Real Madrid 7–3 Granada	12 June 1974	Copa del Rey
10	Sporting Gijón 5–5 Real Madrid	16 February 1989	Copa del Rey
10	Real Madrid 9–1 Tirol	24 October 1990	European Cup
10	Real Madrid 7–3 Sevilla	30 October 2013	La Liga
10	Deportivo La Coruña 2–8 Real Madrid	20 September 2014	La Liga
10	Real Madrid 9–1 Granada	5 April 2015	La Liga
10	Real Madrid 7–3 Getafe	23 May 2015	La Liga

==== In a season ====
- Most goals scored in a season: 174 – 2011–12
- Most goals scored in a season in La Liga: 121 – 2011–12 ^{(Spanish record)}
- Fewest goals scored in a season in La Liga: 24 – 1930–31
- Most goals conceded in a season: 84 – 1998–99 and 2024–25
- Most goals conceded in a season in La Liga: 71 – 1950–51
- Fewest goals conceded in a season in La Liga: 15 – 1931–32 ^{(Spanish record)}
- Best goal difference in a season in La Liga: +89 – 2011–12 ^{(Spanish record)}
- Most matches with goals in a season: 60 – 2016–17; with goals in all matches ^{(Spanish record)}

==== Goalscorers ====
Note: Does not include own goals.

- Most goalscorers in a season: 22 – 2019–20 ^{(Shared record)}
- Most goalscorers in a season in La Liga: 21 – 2019–20
- Most goalscorers in a season in Copa del Rey: 11 – 1977–78
- Most goalscorers in a season in European Cup / UEFA Champions League: 14 – 2001–02
- Most goalscorers in a match: 6
  - Real Madrid 6–0 (Switzerland) Zürich, 1963–64 European Cup, 7 May 1964; Zoco, Felo, Muller, Puskás, Di Stéfano and Amancio
  - Real Madrid 8–0 (Cyprus) Olympiakos Nicosia, 1969–70 European Cup, 24 September 1969; Amancio, Gento, Grosso, Fleitas, Grande and Pirri
  - Real Madrid 7–0 (Spain) Valdepeñas, 1977–78 Copa del Rey, 14 September 1977; Isidro, Aguilar, Santillana, Wolff, Macanás and Del Bosque
  - Real Madrid 7–0 (Luxembourg) Progrès Niederkorn, 1977–78 European Cup, 27 September 1977; Pirri, Jensen, Stielike, Santillana, Hernández and Juanito
  - Real Madrid 7–0 (Spain) Rayo Vallecano, 1979–80 La Liga, 3 February 1980; Santillana, Juanito, Cunningham, Hernández, Martínez and Portugal
  - Real Madrid 7–0 (Spain) Sevilla, 1990–91 La Liga, 3 February 1991; Miguel Tendillo, Butragueno, Míchel, Gordillo, Hierro and Aragón
  - Real Madrid 6–2 (Spain) Málaga, 2012–13 La Liga, 8 May 2013; Albiol, Ronaldo, Özil, Benzema, Modrić and Di María

=== Clean sheets ===
- Most clean sheets in a season: 30 matches – 2010–11 season
- Most clean sheets in a season in La Liga: 21 matches – 2023–24
- Most clean sheets in a season in Copa del Rey: 8 matches – 2013–14 ^{(Spanish record)}
- Most clean sheets in a season in European Cup / UEFA Champions League: 10 matches – 2015–16 ^{(Shared record)}
- Most consecutive clean sheets: 8 matches, 6 January 2014 – 28 January 2014
- Most consecutive clean sheets in La Liga: 7 matches
  - 11 December 1994 – 5 February 1995
  - 7 September 1997 – 27 October 1997
- Longest run without a clean sheet: 24 matches, 26 January 1941 – 18 January 1942
- Longest run without a clean sheet in La Liga: 26 matches, 8 May 1999 – 17 January 2000

=== Points ===
- Most points in a season:
  - Two points for a win: 66 in 44 matches (in 1986–87 season) ^{(Spanish record)}
  - Three points for a win: 100 in 38 matches (in 2011–12 season) ^{(Shared record)}
- Fewest points in a season:
  - Two points for a win: 17 in 18 matches (in 1929–30 season)
  - Three points for a win: 62 in 38 matches (in 1999–2000 season)

=== Penalty shootouts ===
==== By club ====
Clubs	Pld	W	L
Atlético Madrid	6	6	0
Real Sociedad	1	1	0
Real Zaragoza	1	1	0
Barcelona	1	1	0
Valencia	1	1	0
Manchester City	1	1	0
Juventus	1	1	0
Red Star	1	0	1
Athletic Bilbao	1	0	1
Necaxa	1	0	1
Bayern Munich	1	0	1
Total	16	12	4

==== By competition ====
Competition	Pld	W	L
Copa del Rey	5	4	1
UEFA Champions League	5	4	1
Copa de la Liga	2	2	0
Supercopa de España	2	2	0
UEFA Cup Winners' Cup	1	0	1
FIFA Club World Championship	1	0	1
Total	16	12	4

==== Complete list ====
Key

- (penalty scored) = scored penalty
- (penalty missed) = missed penalty
- golden background = scored penalty which ended the shoot-out
- red background = missed penalty which ended the shoot-out
- grey background = the first penalty in the shoot-out
- horizontal line within a list of takers = beginning of the sudden death stage

Penalty shoot-outs played by Real Madrid
#	Against	F	Penalties			Real Madrid		Opponent		Competition	Venue	Date
#	Against	F	S	M	T	GK	Takers	Takers	GK	Competition	Venue	Date
1	Red Star	0–2	5–6	2–1	7–7	Miguel Ángel	del Bosque (penalty scored); Netzer (penalty scored); Aguilar (penalty scored); Breitner (penalty scored); Rubiñán (penalty scored) Benito (penalty missed); Santillana (penalty missed)	(penalty scored) Keri; (penalty scored) Filipović; (penalty scored) Baralić; (penalty scored) Savić; (penalty scored) O. Petrović (penalty missed) Đorđević; (penalty scored) V. Petrović	Ognjen Petrović	1974–75 European Cup Winners' Cup; Quarter-finals	Red Star Stadium; Belgrade	19 March 1975
2	Atlético Madrid	0–0	4–3	1–2	5–5	Miguel Ángel	Amancio (penalty scored); Pirri (penalty scored) del Bosque (penalty missed); Rubiñán (penalty scored); Aguilar (penalty scored)	(penalty missed) Irureta; (penalty scored) Gárate; (penalty missed) Salcedo; (penalty scored) Alberto; (penalty scored) Bezerra	Miguel Reina	1974–75 Copa del Generalísimo; Final	Vicente Calderón; Madrid	5 July 1975
3	Atlético Madrid	2–2	4–1	0–2	4–3	García Remón	Guerini (penalty scored); Wolff (penalty scored); Jensen (penalty scored) del Bosque (penalty scored)	(penalty missed) Cano; (penalty missed) Leivinha; (penalty scored) Rubio	José Navarro	1978–79 Copa del Rey; Third round	Santiago Bernabéu; Madrid	24 January 1979
4	Atlético Madrid	1–1	4–3	1–2	5–5	García Remón	Santillana (penalty scored); Cunningham (penalty missed); Stielike (penalty scored); Juanito (penalty scored); Remón (penalty scored)	(penalty missed) Ramos; (penalty missed) Rubio; (penalty missed) Guzmán; (penalty scored) Bermejo; (penalty scored) Dirceu	José Navarro	1979–80 Copa del Rey; Semi-finals	Santiago Bernabéu; Madrid	24 May 1980
5	Real Sociedad	1–0	4–3	2–3	6–6	Agustín	Camacho (penalty missed); Cunningham (penalty scored); García (penalty missed); Juanito (penalty scored); San José (penalty scored) Ito (penalty scored)	(penalty missed) Kortabarria; (penalty scored) Ufarte; (penalty missed) Diego; (penalty scored) Larrañaga; (penalty scored) Alonso (penalty missed) Murillo	Luis Arconada	1981–82 Copa del Rey; Semi-finals	Santiago Bernabéu; Madrid	31 March 1982
6	Real Zaragoza	5–3	5–4	0–1	5–5	Miguel Ángel	Santillana (penalty scored); Camacho (penalty scored); Metgod (penalty scored); Juanito (penalty scored); San José (penalty scored)	(penalty scored) Señor; (penalty scored) Barbas; (penalty missed) Cortés; (penalty scored) Herrera; (penalty scored) Amarilla	Eugenio Vitaller	1983 Copa de la Liga; Semi-finals	Santiago Bernabéu; Madrid	22 June 1983
7	Athletic Bilbao	1–0	3–4	2–1	5–5	Miguel Ángel	Camacho (penalty missed); Salguero (penalty scored); Stielike (penalty missed); Chendo (penalty scored); Juanito (penalty scored)	(penalty scored) Urtubi; (penalty scored) Dani; (penalty missed) Argote; (penalty scored) Sola; (penalty scored) Núñez	Andoni Zubizarreta	1983–84 Copa del Rey; Semi-finals	San Mamés; Bilbao	18 April 1984
8	Barcelona	1–1	4–1	0–2	4–3	Miguel Ángel	Valdano (penalty scored); San José (penalty scored); Butragueño (penalty scored); Juanito (penalty scored)	(penalty missed) Carrasco; (penalty missed) Gerardo; (penalty scored) Marcos	Urruti	1985 Copa de la Liga; Quarter-finals	Santiago Bernabéu; Madrid	18 May 1985
9	Juventus	0–1	3–1	1–3	4–4	Francisco Buyo	Sánchez (penalty missed); Butragueño (penalty scored); Valdano (penalty scored); Juanito (penalty scored)	(penalty missed) Brio; (penalty scored) Vignola; (penalty missed) Manfredonia; (penalty missed) Favero	Stefano Tacconi	1986–87 European Cup; Second round	Stadio Comunale; Turin	5 November 1986
10	Necaxa	1–1	3–4	2–1	5–5	Albano Bizzarri	Eto'o (penalty scored); Helguera (penalty scored); McManaman (penalty missed); Morientes (penalty scored); Dorado (penalty missed)	(penalty scored) Vázquez; (penalty missed) Cabrera; (penalty scored) Pérez; (penalty scored) Aguinaga; (penalty scored) Delgado	Hugo Pineda	2000 FIFA Club World Championship; Third-place play-off	Maracanã; Rio de Janeiro	14 January 2000
11	Bayern Munich	2–1	1–3	3–2	4–5	Iker Casillas	Ronaldo (penalty missed); Kaká (penalty missed); Alonso (penalty scored); Ramos (penalty missed)	(penalty scored) Alaba; (penalty scored) Gómez; (penalty missed) Kroos; (penalty missed) Lahm; (penalty scored) Schweinsteiger	Manuel Neuer	2011–12 UEFA Champions League; Semi-finals	Santiago Bernabéu; Madrid	25 April 2012
12	Atlético Madrid	0–0	5–3	0–1	5–4	Keylor Navas	Vázquez (penalty scored); Marcelo (penalty scored); Bale (penalty scored); Ramos (penalty scored); Ronaldo (penalty scored)	(penalty scored) Griezmann; (penalty scored) Gabi; (penalty scored) Saúl; (penalty missed) Juanfran	Jan Oblak	2015–16 UEFA Champions League; Final	San Siro; Milan	28 May 2016
13	Atlético Madrid	0–0	4–1	0–2	4–3	Thibaut Courtois	Carvajal (penalty scored); Rodrygo (penalty scored); Modrić (penalty scored); Ramos (penalty scored)	(penalty missed) Saúl; (penalty missed) Partey; (penalty scored) Trippier	Jan Oblak	2019–20 Supercopa de España; Final	King Abdullah Sports City; Jeddah	12 January 2020
14	Valencia	1–1	4–3	0–2	4–5	Thibaut Courtois	Benzema (penalty scored); Modrić (penalty scored); Kroos (penalty scored); Asensio (penalty scored)	(penalty scored) Cavani; (penalty missed) Cömert; (penalty scored) Moriba; (penalty scored) Guillamón; (penalty missed) Gayà	Giorgi Mamardashvili	2023 Supercopa de España; Semi-finals	King Fahd International Stadium; Riyadh	11 January 2023
15	Manchester City	1–1	4–3	1–2	5–5	Andriy Lunin	Modrić (penalty missed); Bellingham (penalty scored); Vázquez (penalty scored); Nacho (penalty scored); Rüdiger (penalty scored)	(penalty scored) Alvarez; (penalty missed) Silva; (penalty missed) Kovačić; (penalty scored) Foden; (penalty scored) Ederson	Ederson	2023–24 UEFA Champions League; Quarter-finals	City of Manchester; Manchester	17 April 2024
16	Atlético Madrid	0–1	4–2	1–2	5–4	Thibaut Courtois	Mbappé (penalty scored); Bellingham (penalty scored); Valverde (penalty scored); Vázquez (penalty missed); Rüdiger (penalty scored)	(penalty scored) Sørloth; (penalty missed) Alvarez; (penalty scored) Correa; (penalty missed) Llorente	Jan Oblak	2024–25 UEFA Champions League; Round of 16	Metropolitano Stadium; Madrid	12 March 2025

==== Penalty shootouts records ====
- Most penalties taken: 6 – (Spain) Juanito, 1977–1987
- Most penalties scored: 6 – (Spain) Juanito, 1977–1987
- Most penalties missed: 2 – (Spain) Camacho, 1974–1989
- Most penalties saved: 5 – (Spain) Miguel Ángel, 1968–1986
- Most penalties taken against Real Madrid: 2
  - (Spain) Rubio, both with Atlético Madrid
  - (Spain) Saúl, both with Atlético Madrid
  - (Argentina) Julián Alvarez, one with Manchester City and one with Atlético Madrid

== Season-by-season performance ==
Season	Division	Pld	W	D	L	GF	GA	Pts	Pos	CdR	Competition	Result	Competition	Result	Player(s)	Goals
Season	League									CdR	Europe		Other		La Liga top scorer (Note: Only includes goals scored in La Liga.)	
2021–22	La Liga	38	26	8	4	80	31	86	1st^{*}	QF	Champions League	W^{*}	Supercopa de España	W^{*}	Benzema	27^{‡}
2022–23	La Liga	38	24	6	8	75	36	78	2nd^{†}	W^{*}	Champions League	SF	UEFA Super Cup Supercopa de España FIFA Club World Cup	W^{*} RU^{†} W^{*}	Benzema	19
2023–24	La Liga	38	29	8	1	87	26	95	1st^{*}	R16	Champions League	W^{*}	Supercopa de España	W^{*}	Bellingham	19
2024–25	La Liga	38	26	6	6	78	38	84	2nd^{†}	RU^{†}	Champions League	QF	UEFA Super Cup Supercopa de España FIFA Intercontinental Cup FIFA Club World Cup	W^{*} RU^{†} W^{*} SF	Mbappé	31^{‡} (Note: Kylian Mbappé was La Liga top scorer (31 goals) and won the European Golden Shoe.)
2025–26	La Liga	38	27	5	6	77	35	86	2nd^{†}	R16	Champions League	QF	Supercopa de España	RU^{†}	Mbappé	25^{‡}

== Honours ==
=== Official ===
==== Regional competitions ====
- Campeonato Regional Centro / Trofeo Mancomunado:
  - Winners (23, record): 1903, (Note: The 1903 championship was won by Moderno FC and was included in Real Madrid's trophies following their merger in 1904.) 1905, 1906, 1906–07, (Note: In the 1906–07 season, Madrid FC won the tournament, but the Madrid Football Federation annulled the results.) 1907–08, 1912–13, 1915–16, 1916–17, 1917–18, 1919–20, 1921–22, 1922–23, 1923–24, 1925–26, 1926–27, 1928–29, 1929–30, 1930–31, 1931–32, 1932–33, 1933–34, 1934–35, 1935–36
  - Runners-up (7): 1908–09 (after tiebreakers), 1910–11, 1914–15, 1918–19, 1924–25, 1927–28, 1939–40
- Copa Federación Centro:
  - Winners (4, record): 1922–23, 1927–28, 1943–44, 1944–45
  - Runners-up (1): 1940–41

==== Domestic competitions ====
- La Liga:
  - Winners (36, record): 1931–32, 1932–33, 1953–54, 1954–55, 1956–57, 1957–58, 1960–61, 1961–62, 1962–63, 1963–64, 1964–65, 1966–67, 1967–68, 1968–69, 1971–72, 1974–75, 1975–76, 1977–78, 1978–79, 1979–80, 1985–86, 1986–87, 1987–88, 1988–89, 1989–90, 1994–95, 1996–97, 2000–01, 2002–03, 2006–07, 2007–08, 2011–12, 2016–17, 2019–20, 2021–22, 2023–24
  - Runners-up (27): 1929, 1933–34, 1934–35, 1935–36, 1941–42, 1944–45, 1958–59, 1959–60, 1965–66, 1980–81, 1982–83, 1983–84, 1991–92, 1992–93, 1998–99, 2004–05, 2005–06, 2008–09, 2009–10, 2010–11, 2012–13, 2014–15, 2015–16, 2020–21, 2022–23, 2024–25, 2025–26
- Copa del Rey:
  - Winners (20): 1905, 1906, 1907, 1908, 1917, 1934, 1936, 1946, 1947, 1961–62, 1969–70, 1973–74, 1974–75, 1979–80, 1981–82, 1988–89, 1992–93, 2010–11, 2013–14, 2022–23
  - Runners-up (21, record): 1903, 1916, 1918, 1924, 1928–29, 1930, 1933, 1940, 1943, 1958, 1959–60, 1960–61, 1967–68, 1978–79, 1982–83, 1989–90, 1991–92, 2001–02, 2003–04, 2012–13, 2024–25
- Copa de la Liga:
  - Winners (1): 1985
  - Runners-up (1): 1983
- Supercopa de España:
  - Winners (13): 1988, 1989, 1990, 1993, 1997, 2001, 2003, 2008, 2012, 2017, 2020, 2022, 2024
  - Runners-up (8): 1982, 1995, 2007, 2011, 2014, 2023, 2025, 2026
- Copa Eva Duarte:
  - Winners (1): 1947 (Note: Inaugural winners.)

==== European competitions ====
- European Cup / UEFA Champions League:
  - Winners (15, record): 1955–56, 1956–57, 1957–58, 1958–59, 1959–60, 1965–66, 1997–98, 1999–2000, 2001–02, 2013–14, 2015–16, 2016–17, 2017–18, 2021–22, 2023–24
  - Runners-up (3): 1961–62, 1963–64, 1980–81
- European / UEFA Cup Winners' Cup:
  - Runners-up (2, joint record): 1970–71, 1982–83
- UEFA Cup / UEFA Europa League:
  - Winners (2): 1984–85, 1985–86
- European / UEFA Super Cup:
  - Winners (6, record): 2002, 2014, 2016, 2017, 2022, 2024
  - Runners-up (3): 1998, 2000, 2018
- Latin Cup:
  - Winners (2, joint record): 1955, 1957

==== Worldwide competitions ====
- FIFA Club World Cup:
  - Winners (5, record): 2014, 2016, 2017, 2018, 2022
- Intercontinental Cup:
  - Winners (3, joint record): 1960, 1998, 2002
  - Runners-up (2): 1966, 2000
- FIFA Intercontinental Cup:
  - Winners (1, joint record): 2024
- Copa Iberoamericana:
  - Winners (1, record): 1994

=== Unofficial ===
- Santiago Bernabéu Trophy: 28
  - 1981, 1983, 1984, 1985, 1987, 1989, 1991, 1994, 1995, 1996, 1997, 1998, 1999, 2000, 2003, 2005, 2006, 2007, 2008, 2009, 2010, 2011, 2012, 2013, 2015, 2016, 2017, 2018

- Trofeo Ciudad de Alicante: 10
  - 1990, 1991, 1992, 1993, 1995, 1998, 2000, 2001, 2002, 2010
- Trofeo Teresa Herrera: 10
  - 1949, 1953, 1966, 1976, 1978, 1979, 1980, 1994, 2013, 2026
- Trofeo Ramón de Carranza: 6
  - 1958, 1959, 1960, 1966, 1970, 1982
- Trofeo Ciudad de La Línea: 5
  - 1981, 1982, 1986, 1994, 2000
- Trofeo Ciutat de Palma: 4
  - 1975, 1980, 1983, 1990
- Trofeo Bahía de Cartagena: 4
  - 1994, 1998, 1999, 2001
- Trofeo Inmortal de Girona: 4
  - 1977, 1979, 1980, 1981
- Trofeo Colombino: 3
  - 1970, 1984, 1989
- Trofeo Ciudad de Barcelona: 3
  - 1983, 1985, 1988
- Trofeo Euskadi Asegarce: 3
  - 1994, 1995, 1996
- Trofeo Festa d'Elx: 3
  - 1984, 1985, 1999
- Trofeo Ciudad de Santander: 3
  - 1991, 1992, 1993
- Small Club World Cup:
  - Winners (2, joint record): 1952, 1956
- International Champions Cup: 3
  - 2013, 2015 Australia, 2015 China
- Trofeo Ciudad de Vigo: 2
  - 1981, 1982
- Trofeo Naranja: 2
  - 1990, 2003
- Trofeo Concepción Arenal: 2
  - 1977, 1984
- Trofeo de Navidad Comunidad de Madrid: 2
  - 1994, 1995
- Trofeo de la Hispanidad: 2
  - 1995, 1996
- World Football Challenge: 2
  - 2011, 2012
- Trofeo Benito Villamarín: 1
  - 1960
- Mohammed V Trophy: 1
  - 1966
- Trofeo Año Santo Compostelano: 1
  - 1970
- Trofeo Costa del Sol: 1
  - 1976
- Trofeo Ciudad de Caracas: 1
  - 1980
- Trofeo Ibérico: 1
  - 1982
- Trofeo Centenario A.C. Milan: 1
  - 2000
- Trofeo Jesús Gil: 1
  - 2005
- Trofeo Centenario Real Sociedad: 1
  - 2009
- Taci Oil Cup: 1
  - 2010
- Franz-Beckenbauer-Cup: 1
  - 2010
- npower Challenge Cup: 1
  - 2011
- Audi Football Summit: 1
  - 2016
- MLS All-Star Game: 1
  - 2017

In 2017, Real Madrid received the Nine Values Cup, an award of the international children's social programme Football for Friendship.

=== Achievements ===
==== Doubles ====
European double

- La Liga and European Cup / UEFA Champions League: 5
  - 1956–57, 1957–58, 2016–17, 2021–22, 2023–24

League and UEFA Cup double

- La Liga and UEFA Cup: 1
  - 1985–86

European cup double

- Copa del Rey and UEFA Champions League: 1
  - 2013–14

European league cup double

- Copa de la Liga and UEFA Cup: 1
  - 1984–85

Domestic double

- La Liga and Copa del Rey: 4
  - 1961–62, 1974–75, 1979–80, 1988–89

==== Three or more successive titles ====
European Cup / UEFA Champions League

- 1955–56, 1956–57, 1957–58, 1958–59, 1959–60 (five consecutive)
- 2015–16, 2016–17, 2017–18

FIFA Club World Cup

- 2016, 2017, 2018

La Liga

- 1960–61, 1961–62, 1962–63, 1963–64, 1964–65 (five consecutive)
- 1966–67, 1967–68, 1968–69
- 1977–78, 1978–79, 1979–80
- 1985–86, 1986–87, 1987–88, 1988–89, 1989–90 (five consecutive)

Copa del Rey

- 1905, 1906, 1907, 1908 (four consecutive)

Supercopa de España

- 1988, 1989, 1990

==== Four titles in a season ====
2016–17

- UEFA Super Cup, FIFA Club World Cup, La Liga, UEFA Champions League

2017–18

- UEFA Super Cup, Supercopa de España, FIFA Club World Cup, UEFA Champions League

== Awards ==
=== Players Awards ===
==== Ballon d'Or (1956–) ====
The following players have won the Ballon d'Or while playing for Real Madrid:

- (Argentina) (Colombia) (Spain) Alfredo Di Stéfano – 1957, 1959
- (France) Raymond Kopa – 1958
- (Portugal) Luís Figo – 2000
- (Brazil) Ronaldo – 2002
- (Italy) Fabio Cannavaro – 2006
- (Portugal) Cristiano Ronaldo – 2013, 2014, 2016, 2017
- (Croatia) Luka Modrić – 2018
- (France) Karim Benzema – 2022

==== FIFA World Player of the Year (1991–2009) ====
The following players have won the FIFA World Player of the Year award while playing for Real Madrid:

- (Portugal) Luís Figo – 2001
- (Brazil) Ronaldo – 2002
- (France) Zinedine Zidane – 2003
- (Italy) Fabio Cannavaro – 2006

==== The Best FIFA Men's Player (2016–) ====
The following players have won The Best FIFA Men's Player while playing for Real Madrid:

- (Portugal) Cristiano Ronaldo – 2016, 2017
- (Croatia) Luka Modrić – 2018
- (Brazil) Vinícius Júnior – 2024

==== European Golden Boot ====
The following players have won the European Golden Shoe while playing for Real Madrid:

- (Mexico) Hugo Sánchez – 1989–90 (38 goals)
- (Portugal) Cristiano Ronaldo – 2010–11 (40 goals), 2013–14 (31 goals), 2014–15 (48 goals)
- (France) Kylian Mbappé – 2024–25 (31 goals)

==== UEFA Club Footballer of the Year (1998–2010) ====
The following players have won the UEFA Club Footballer of the Year award while playing for Real Madrid:

- (Argentina) Fernando Redondo – 2000
- (France) Zinedine Zidane – 2002

==== UEFA Best Player in Europe Award (2011–) ====
The following players have won the UEFA Best Player in Europe Award while playing for Real Madrid:

- (Portugal) Cristiano Ronaldo – 2014, 2016, 2017
- (Croatia) Luka Modrić – 2018
- (France) Karim Benzema – 2022

==== UEFA Champions League Player of the Season (2022–) ====
- (France) Karim Benzema – 2021–22
- (Brazil) Vinícius Júnior – 2023–24

==== UEFA Champions League Young Player of the Season (2022–) ====
- (Brazil) Vinícius Júnior – 2021–22
- (England) Jude Bellingham – 2023–24

==== Pichichi winners ====
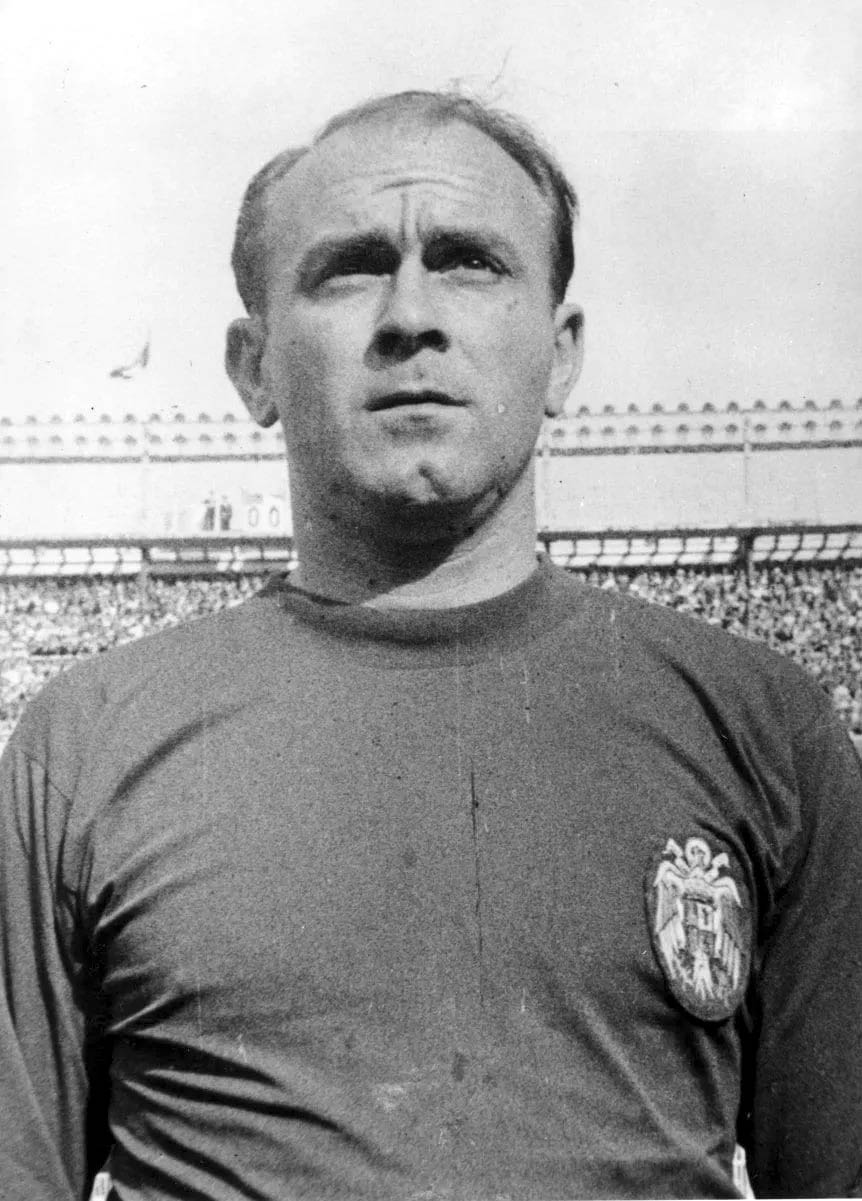
Alfredo Di Stéfano won the Pichichi Trophy a record five times.

The following Real Madrid players have won the Pichichi Trophy:

- (Spain) Manuel Olivares: (1) 1931–32
- (Spain) Pahiño: (1) 1951–52
- (Argentina) (Colombia) (Spain) Alfredo Di Stéfano: (5) 1953–54, 1955–56, 1956–57, 1957–58, 1958–59
- (Hungary) (Spain) Ferenc Puskás: (4) 1959–60, 1960–61, 1962–63, 1963–64
- (Spain) Amancio: (2) 1968–69, 1969–70
- (Spain) Juanito: (1) 1983–84
- (Mexico) Hugo Sánchez: (4) 1985–86, 1986–87, 1987–88, 1989–90
- (Spain) Emilio Butragueño: (1) 1990–91
- (Chile) Iván Zamorano: (1) 1994–95
- (Spain) Raúl: (2) 1998–99, 2000–01
- (Brazil) Ronaldo: (1) 2003–04
- (Netherlands) Ruud van Nistelrooy: (1) 2006–07
- (Portugal) Cristiano Ronaldo: (3) 2010–11, 2013–14, 2014–15
- (France) Karim Benzema: (1) 2021–22
- (France) Kylian Mbappé: (2) 2024–25, 2025–26

==== Zamora winners ====
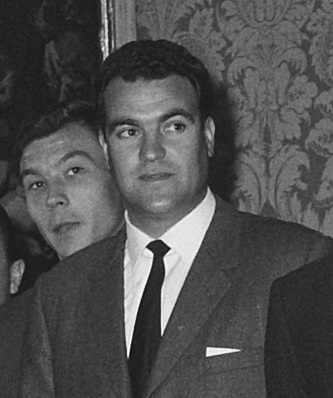
Antonio Betancort won the Zamora Trophy a record three times, along with José Vicente Train.

The following Real Madrid players have won the Ricardo Zamora Trophy:

- (Spain) Ricardo Zamora: (2) 1931–32, 1932–33
- (Spain) José Bañón: (1) 1945–46
- (Spain) Juan Alonso: (1) 1954–55
- (Spain) José Vicente Train: (3) 1960–61, 1962–63, 1963–64
- (Spain) José Araquistáin: (1) 1961–62
- (Spain) Antonio Betancort: (3) 1964–65, 1966–67, 1967–68
- (Spain) García Remón: (1) 1972–73
- (Spain) Miguel Ángel: (1) 1975–76
- (Spain) Agustín: (1) 1982–83
- (Spain) Francisco Buyo: (2) 1987–88, 1991–92
- (Spain) Iker Casillas: (1) 2007–08
- (Belgium) Thibaut Courtois: (1) 2019–20

=== Managers awards ===
==== FIFA World Coach of the Year / The Best FIFA Football Coach ====
The following managers have won the FIFA World Coach of the Year / The Best FIFA Football Coach while managing Real Madrid:

- (Portugal) José Mourinho – 2010
- (France) Zinedine Zidane – 2017
- (Italy) Carlo Ancelotti – 2024

==== IFFHS World's Best Club Coach winners ====
The following managers have won the IFFHS World's Best Club Coach while managing Real Madrid:

- (Spain) Vicente del Bosque – 2002
- (Portugal) José Mourinho – 2012
- (Italy) Carlo Ancelotti – 2014, 2022, 2024
- (France) Zinedine Zidane – 2017, 2018

==== Johan Cruyff Trophy (2024–) ====
The following managers have won the Men's Johan Cruyff Trophy while managing Real Madrid:

- (Italy) Carlo Ancelotti – 2024

=== Club awards ===
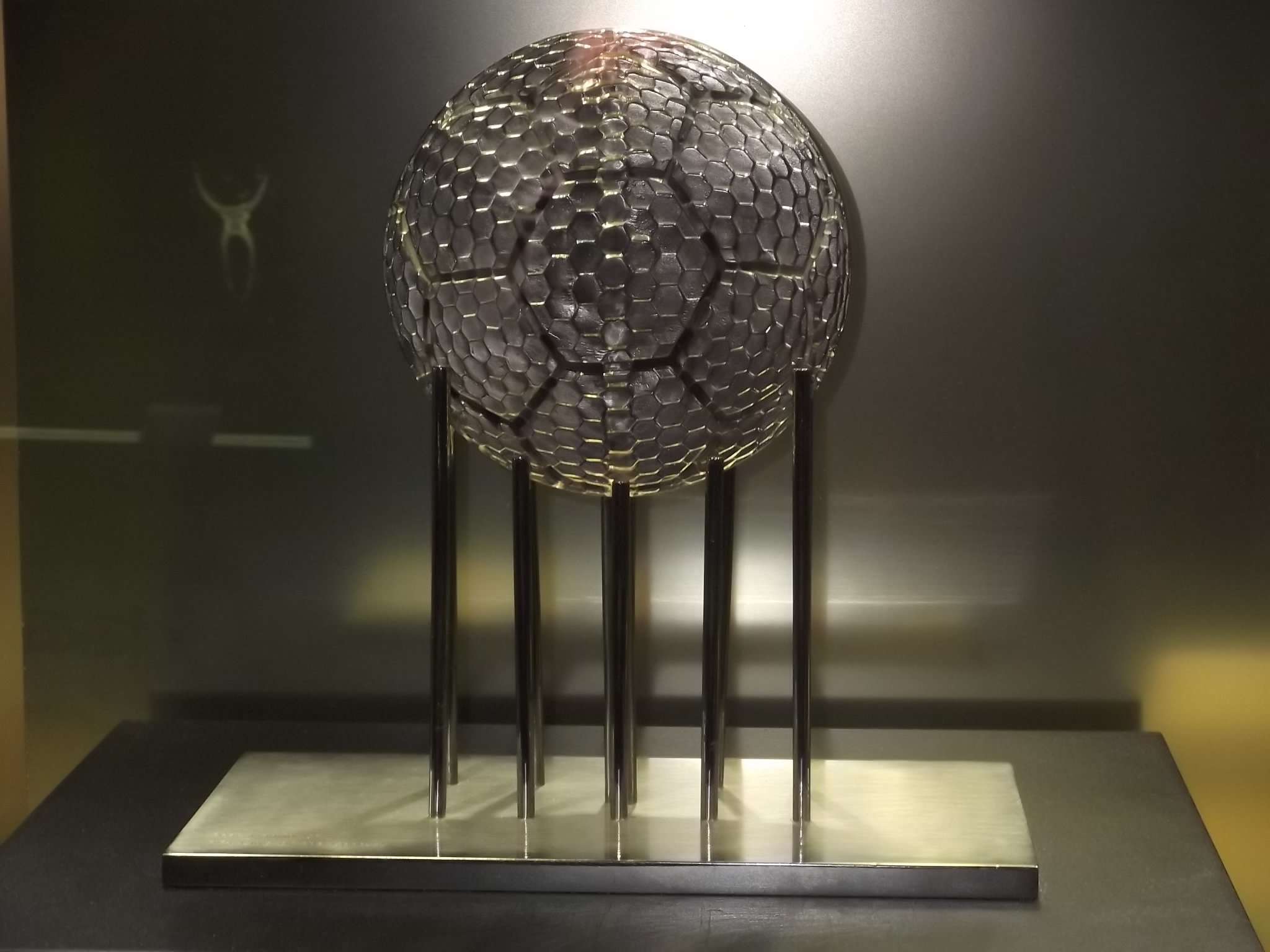
FIFA Club of the Century trophy, exhibited at the Real Madrid Museum.

- FIFA Club of the Century: 2000
- FIFA Order of Merit: 2004
- IFFHS Best European Club of the 20th Century
- Kicker Sportmagazin Club of the 20th Century
- Globe Soccer Best Club of the 21st Century
- Globe Soccer Best Club of the Year: 2014, 2016, 2017, 2022, 2024 (record)
- IFFHS The World's Club Team of the Year: 2000, 2002, 2014, 2017, 2024 (joint record)
- Laureus World Sports Award for Team of the Year: 2025
- World Soccer Men's World Team of the Year: 2017
- Ballon d'Or Men's Club of the Year: 2024

== Rankings ==
- European Cup / UEFA Champions League all-time club rankings (since 1955): 1st place
- UEFA coefficient most top-ranked club by 5-year period (since 1975–1979): 16 times (record)
- All-time La Liga table (since 1929): 1st place

== Guinness World Records ==
- Most matches won in the UEFA Champions League era by a football team
- Most consecutive UEFA Champions League matches scored in (jointly held)
- Most title wins of the top division in Spanish football
- Most title wins of the football European Cup / Champions League
- Most consecutive home matches unbeaten in the top division of Spanish football
- Most consecutive matches won in the top division of Spanish football (jointly held)
- Most valuable football club
- Most followers on Instagram for a sports team

== Other achievements ==
- Most appearances in the European Cup / UEFA Champions League: 57 seasons
- First club to own the European Champion Clubs' Cup's official trophy.
- World's most valuable sports team: 2013, 2014, 2015
- First club to win consecutive UEFA Cups (1985 and 1986).
- Only team in UEFA club football history to defend both the European Cup and UEFA Champions League successfully.
- Only team to win consecutive FIFA Club World Cup titles as well as three titles in a row (2016, 2017, 2018).
- First and only club to win three consecutive (or more) European Cup / UEFA Champions League titles twice (1956–1960 and 2016–2018).
- First club to win consecutive UEFA Champions League titles and the only club to win three consecutive titles (2016, 2017, 2018).
- Most club world championships titles: 9
- World's most valuable football club: 2013–2016, 2019–2020, 2022–2025
- Highest-earning football club in the world: 2006–2016, 2019, 2024–2025
- Most European Cup / UEFA Champions League titles: 15
- Most UEFA Super Cup titles: 6
- Most UEFA club competition titles: 26
- First club to defend the European Double successfully.
- Only club to win five consecutive European Cup / UEFA Champions League titles (1956–1960).
- Most European Cup / UEFA Champions League final appearances: 18
- Most European Cup / UEFA Champions League semi-final appearances: 33
- Most consecutive seasons in the European Cup: 15 (1955–56 to 1969–70)
- Most consecutive appearances in the UEFA Champions League group stage / league phase: 30 (1997–98 to 2026–27)
- Most consecutive seasons in the UEFA Champions League knockout phase: 29 (1997–98 to 2025–26)
- Most consecutive UEFA Champions League semi-final appearances: 8 (2010–11 to 2017–18)
- Most consecutive European Cup final appearances: 5 (1956–1960)
- Most consecutive UEFA Champions League final appearances: 3 (2016–2018) (joint record)
- Most successful UEFA team to defend the European Cup / UEFA Champions League trophy: 6/15
- Most times to win all UEFA Champions League group stage matches: 3 (2011–12, 2014–15 and 2023–24) (joint record)
- Most consecutive knockout tie wins in European Cup: 20 (1955–1960)
- Most consecutive knockout tie wins in UEFA Champions League: 12 (2016–2018)
- Most consecutive European Cup / UEFA Champions League matches scoring: 34 (joint record)
