= 1942–43 Real Madrid CF season =

40th season in existence of Real Madrid CF

Real Madrid Club de Futbol
1942–43 season
- President: Antonio Santos Peralba
- Manager: Juan Armet (Until 13 December 1942); Pablo Hernandez (Until 27 December 1942); Ramon Encinas
- Stadium: Chamartín
- Primera Division: 10th
- Copa del Generalísimo: Runners-up
- Top goalscorer: League: Alday (16); All: Alday (17)
Home colours	Away colours

The 1942–43 season was Real Madrid Club de Fútbol's 40th season in existence and the club's 11th consecutive season in the top flight of Spanish football.

== Summary ==
The club had the third worst campaign ever, finishing 10th and avoiding relegation by just one single point. Head coach Juan Armet "Kinké" was fired on round 12 after a bad streak of results, then after one match with Pablo Hernandez Coronado managing another lost game, the executive board appointed Ramon Encinas with the main goal of avoiding relegation, which he successfully accomplished.

After having remained in the first category aimed by the goals of Manuel Alday, which included an emphatic 7–0 victory over Español, the squad advanced rounds in the 1943 Copa del Generalísimo, where it fared far better, reaching the semi-finals and meeting archrivals FC Barcelona there. In the first leg of the series the club lost 0–3 but then, on 13 June 1943, the squad defeated Barcelona with a colossal 11–1 scoreline, being in fact the most landslide result in El Clásico. In the final, the squad was defeated 1–0 by Atletico Bilbao with a Telmo Zarra extra time goal.

== Squad ==
Note: Flags indicate national team as defined under FIFA eligibility rules; some limited exceptions apply. Players may hold more than one non-FIFA nationality.

No.	Pos.	Nation	Player
—	GK	ESP	Marzá
—	DF	ESP	Mardones
—	DF	ESP	Arzanegui
—	MF	ESP	Ipiña
—	MF	ESP	Antonio Alsúa
—	MF	ESP	Nazario Belmar
—	MF	ESP	Moleiro
—	MF	MEX	Sauto
—	FW	CUB	Chus Alonso
—	FW	ESP	Botella
—	FW	ESP	Manuel Alday

No.	Pos.	Nation	Player
—	GK	ESP	Esquiva
—	MF	ESP	Félix Huete
—	MF	ESP	Rovira
—	FW	ESP	Arbiza
—	DF	ESP	Olivares
—	MF	ESP	Sepúlveda
—	DF	ESP	Querejeta
—	DF	ESP	Clemente
—	FW	ESP	Sanz
—	FW	ESP	Cuca
—	DF	ESP	Pruden
—	DF	ESP	Pepe Corona
—	DF	ESP	Ramon Maciá
—	DF	ESP	Sabino Barinaga

=== Transfers ===
In
Pos.	Name	from	Type
GK	Maximo Sepulveda	Ferroviaria CF	
DF	Querejeta	Real Sociedad	
FW	Pruden	UD Salamanca	
FW	Cuca	Ferroviaría	
DF	Pepe Corona	Alicante CD	
DF	Maciá		

Out
Pos.	Name	To	Type
MF	Simón Lecue	Valencia CF	
DF	Jacinto Quincoces		
MF	Leoncito	Real Valladolid	

== Competitions ==
=== La Liga ===
==== Position by round ====
Round	1	2	3	4	5	6	7	8	9	10	11	12	13	14	15	16	17	18	19	20	21	22	23	24	25	26
Ground	H	A	H	A	H	A	H	A	H	A	H	A	H	A	H	A	H	A	H	A	H	A	H	A	H	A
Result	W	W	W	L	D	L	L	L	W	L	D	L	L	D	W	W	W	L	L	L	W	W	W	L	D	D
Position	3	2	3	5	4	4	7	10	7	11	10	11	11	11	11	11	8	11	11	11	10	10	7	10	10	10

Source: www.lfp.es
A = Away; H = Home; W = Win; D = Draw; L = Loss

==== League table ====
Pos	Team	Pld	W	D	L	GF	GA	GD	Pts	Qualification or relegation
8	Atlético Aviación	26	11	5	10	54	44	+10	27 (Note: Valencia finished ahead of Atlético Aviación on head-to-head points: Valencia–Atlético Aviación 3–0, Atlético Aviación–Valencia 1–1.)	
9	Deportivo de La Coruña	26	7	12	7	35	32	+3	26	
10	Real Madrid	26	10	5	11	52	50	+2	25	
11	Español (O)	26	9	6	11	45	51	−6	24	Qualification for the relegation play-offs
12	Granada (O)	26	9	4	13	56	68	−12	22	Qualification for the relegation play-offs

Source: BDFútbol
Rules for classification: 1) points; 2) head-to-head points; 3) head-to-head goal difference; 4) goal difference; 5) number of goals scored.
(O) Play-off winners

==== Matches ====
27 September 1942 1	Real Madrid	3–0	FC Barcelona	Madrid
		Report		Stadium: Chamartín

4 October 1942 1	Deportivo La Coruña	1–2	Real Madrid	La Coruña
		Report		Stadium: Estadio Riazor

11 October 1942 3	Real Madrid	2–1	Real Zaragoza	Madrid
		Report		Stadium: Chamartín

18 October 1942 4	Real Betis	3–1	Real Madrid	Seville
		Report		Stadium: Heliopolis

6 February 1944 5	Real Madrid	0–0	CD Castellón	Madrid
		Report		Stadium: Chamartín

14 November 1943 6	Celta	2–1	Real Madrid	Vigo
		Report		Stadium: Balaídos

17 October 1943 7	Real Madrid	1–3	Atlético Aviación	Madrid
		Report		Stadium: Chamartín

13 February 1944 8	Español	4–2	Real Madrid	Barcelona
		Report		Stadium: Sarrià

23 November 1943 9	Real Madrid	2–1	Real Oviedo	Madrid
		Report		Stadium: Chamartín

26 March 1944 10	Athletic Bilbao	3–2	Real Madrid	Bilbao
		Report		Stadium: San Mamés

3 October 1943 11	Real Madrid	1–1	Sevilla CF	Madrid
		Report		Stadium: Chamartín

10 October 1943 12	Granada CF	1–0	Real Madrid	Granada
		Report		Stadium: Los Carmenes

2 April 1944 13	Real Madrid	0–1	Valencia CF	Madrid
		Report		Stadium: Chamartín

9 April 1944 14	FC Barcelona	5–5	Real Madrid	Barcelona
		Report		Stadium: Les Corts

9 January 1944 15	Real Madrid	4–3	Deportivo La Coruña	Madrid
		Report		Stadium: Chamartín

9 January 1944 16	Real Zaragoza	0–2	Real Madrid	Madrid
		Report		Stadium: Chamartín

9 January 1944 17	Real Madrid	3–1	Real Betis	Madrid
		Report		Stadium: Chamartín

24 October 1943 5	CD Castellón	3–0	Real Madrid	Castellón de la Plana
		Report		Stadium: Castalia

20 February 1944 19	Real Madrid	2–4	Celta	Madrid
		Report		Stadium: Chamartín

21 February 1943 20	Atlético Aviación	2–1	Real Madrid	Madrid
		Report

7 November 1943 21	Real Madrid	7–0	Español	Madrid
		Report		Stadium: Chamartín

5 March 1944 22	Real Oviedo	3–4	Real Madrid	Oviedo
		Report		Stadium: Carlos Tartiere

12 December 1943 23	Real Madrid	2–0	Atletico Bilbao	Madrid
		Report		Stadium: Chamartín

21 March 1943 24	Sevilla CF	3–0	Real Madrid	Seville
		Report		Stadium: Nervión

28 March 1943 25	Real Madrid	2–2	Granada CF	Madrid
		Report		Stadium: Chamartín

4 April 1943 26	Valencia CF	3–3	Real Madrid	Valencia
		Report		Stadium: Mestalla

=== Copa del Generalísimo ===
==== Semi-finals ====
6 June 1943 1	FC Barcelona	3–0	Real Madrid	Barcelona
	Valle 34'; Escola 43' (pen.); Sospedra 60'	Report		Stadium: Camp de Les Corts; Referee: Fombona Fernández

13 June 1943 2	Real Madrid	11–1	FC Barcelona	Madrid
	Pruden 5'; Sabino Barinaga 30'; Pruden 32'; Pruden 35'; Chus Alonso 37'; Antonio Alsúa 38'; Sabino Barinaga 41'; Sabino Barinaga 44'; Chus Alonso 74'; Botella 85'; Sabino Barinaga 87'	Report	Martin 89'	Stadium: Estadio Chamartín; Referee: Rodriguez Mato

==== Final ====
20 June 1943 1	Club Atlético de Bilbao	1–0 (a.e.t.)	Real Madrid	Madrid
19:00 CET	Zarra 104'	Report (in Spanish)		Stadium: Estadio Metropolitano; Attendance: 50,000; Referee: Agustín Cruella

== Statistics ==
=== Squad statistics ===
competition	points	total						GD
competition	points	G	V	N	P	Gf	Gs	GD
1942–43 La Liga	31	26	11	9	6	46	30	+16
1943 Copa del Generalísimo	–	3	0	2	1	4	6	−2
Total		42	36	6	10	113	55	+58

=== Players statistics ===
No.	Pos	Nat	Player	Total		1942–43 La Liga		1943 Copa del Generalísimo	
No.	Pos	Nat	Player	Apps	Goals	Apps	Goals	Apps	Goals
	GK	(Spain) ESP	Marzá	33	-56	23	-42	10	-14
	DF	(Spain) ESP	Mardones	22	3	22	3		
	DF	(Spain) ESP	Arzanegui	19	0	19	0		
	MF	(Spain) ESP	Ipiña	36	1	26	0	10	1
	MF	(Spain) ESP	Antonio Alsúa	32	9	22	6	10	3
	MF	(Spain) ESP	Nazario Belmar	23	8	18	5	5	3
	MF	(Spain) ESP	Moleiro	26	3	18	3	8	0
	MF	(Mexico) MEX	Sauto	28	0	18	0	10	0
	FW	(Cuba) CUB	Chus Alonso	36	14	26	8	10	6
	FW	(Spain) ESP	Botella	34	3	25	2	9	1
	FW	(Spain) ESP	Manuel Alday	18	17	17	16	1	1
	GK	(Spain) ESP	Esquiva	3	-8	3	-8		
	MF	(Spain) ESP	Félix Huete	16	0	14	0	2	0
	MF	(Spain) ESP	Rovira	12	0	12	0		
	FW	(Spain) ESP	Arbiza	8	8	8	8		
	DF	(Spain) ESP	Olivares	5	0	5	0		
	MF	(Spain) ESP	Sepúlveda	0	0	0	0		
	DF	(Spain) ESP	Querejeta	14	0	4	0	10	0
	DF	(Spain) ESP	Clemente	3	0	3	0		
	FW	(Spain) ESP	Sanz	2	0	2	0		
	FW	(Spain) ESP	Cuca	2	0	1	0	1	0
	FW	(Spain) ESP	Pruden	9	9	0	0	9	9
	DF	(Spain) ESP	Pepe Corona	9	0	0	0	9	0
	FW	(Spain) ESP	Ramon Maciá	1	0	0	0	1	0
	FW	(Spain) ESP	Sabino Barinaga	5	5	0	0	5	5

- Source: http://www.bdfutbol.com/en/t/t1942-432.html
