= Cedres =

Cedres (French for cedars) may refer to:

== People ==
- Antonio Cedrés (1927–2015), Spanish footballer and coach
- Cristian Cedrés (born 1996), Spanish footballer
- Fernando Clavijo Cedrés (1956–2019), Uruguayan-born American soccer player and head coach
- Gabriel Cedrés (born 1970), Uruguayan footballer
- Jimena Cedrés (born 1993), Argentine field hockey player
- Juan Cedrés (1927–1979), Spanish professional footballer
- Miguel Jiménez (boxer) (born 1970)

== Places ==
- Les Cèdres, Quebec, municipality in the Montérégie of Quebec, Canada
  - Montréal/Les Cèdres Airport
- Jardin botanique "Les Cèdres", a private botanical garden
- Cedre, a French car manufacturer
