= 1952–53 Real Madrid CF season =

50th season in existence of Real Madrid CF

Real Madrid Club de Futbol
1952–53 season
- President: Santiago Bernabéu
- Manager: Juan Antonio Ipiña
- Stadium: Nuevo Chamartín
- Primera Division: 3rd
- Copa del Generalísimo: Semi-finals
- Top goalscorer: Pahiño (19)
Home colours	Away colours

The 1952–53 season was Real Madrid Club de Fútbol's 50th season in existence and the club's 21st consecutive season in the top flight of Spanish football.

== Summary ==
During Summer Juan Antonio Ipiña took the job as new coach. The squad reached a decent third place on League table three points below Champions FC Barcelona. Striker Pahiño chose to not renew his contract and left the club towards Deportivo La Coruña on 1 August 1953. under pressure President Santiago Bernabéu reached and agreement with Joseíto and the forward chose to remain another season.

In June, the squad reached 1953 Copa del Generalísimo semi-finals being defeated after two matches by Atletico Bilbao with a 3–4 aggregate score.

== Squad ==
Note: Flags indicate national team as defined under FIFA eligibility rules; some limited exceptions apply. Players may hold more than one non-FIFA nationality.

No.	Pos.	Nation	Player
—	GK	ESP	Juan Alonso
—	DF	ESP	Navarro
—	DF	ESP	Oliva
—	DF	ESP	Alonso
—	DF	ESP	Zárraga
—	MF	ESP	Olmedo
—	MF	ESP	Miguel Muñoz
—	MF	ARG	Roque Olsen
—	MF	ESP	Luis Molowny
—	FW	ESP	Joseíto
—	FW	ESP	Pahiño

No.	Pos.	Nation	Player
—	GK	ESP	Cosme
—	FW	ESP	Arsuaga
—	DF	FRA	Hon
—	DF	ESP	Lesmes II
—	GK	ESP	Adauto
—	MF	ESP	Sobrado
—	FW	ESP	Cabrera
—	FW	ESP	Juan Cedrés Cabrera
—	FW	ESP	Espina
—	MF	ESP	Montalvo

=== Transfers ===
In
Pos.	Name	from	Type
GK	Cosme	Hércules CF	
DF	Lesmes	Real Valladolid	
MF	Juan Cedrés Cabrera	UD Las Palmas	

Out
Pos.	Name	To	Type
MF	Greus		
MF	Guillermo Pont	CD Málaga	
DF	José Manuel González López	Granada CF	
FW	Nemes		
MF	Luciano	UD Las Palmas	

== Competitions ==
=== La Liga ===
==== League table ====
Pos	Team	Pld	W	D	L	GF	GA	GD	Pts	Qualification or relegation
1	Barcelona (C)	30	19	4	7	82	43	+39	42	
2	Valencia	30	16	8	6	66	42	+24	40	Qualification for the Latin Cup (Note: The winner of the 1952–53 La Liga, Barcelona, had to play the 1953 Copa del Generalísimo and had no dates available to play the Latin Cup.)
3	Real Madrid	30	18	3	9	67	49	+18	39	
4	Español	30	16	4	10	64	40	+24	36	
5	Sevilla	30	16	2	12	70	57	+13	34	

Source: BDFútbol
Rules for classification: 1) Points; 2) Head-to-head results; 3) Goal difference; 4) Number of goals scored
(C) Champions

==== Position by round ====
Round	1	2	3	4	5	6	7	8	9	10	11	12	13	14	15	16	17	18	19	20	21	22	23	24	25	26	27	28	29	30
Ground	A	H	H	A	H	A	H	A	H	A	H	A	H	A	H	H	A	A	H	A	H	A	H	A	H	A	H	A	H	A
Result	D	D	L	L	W	D	W	L	W	W	W	W	W	L	W	W	L	W	W	L	W	W	W	L	W	L	W	W	W	L
Position	7	10	12	12	11	11	9	9	8	8	7	6	4	4	5	4	3	5	3	3	4	3	2	4	3	4	3	2	2	3

Source: www.lfp.es
A = Away; H = Home; W = Win; D = Draw; L = Loss; = Leader, 1953 Latin Cup

==== Matches ====
14 September 1952 1	Sevilla CF	2–2	Real Madrid	Seville
	Domenech 40'; Ramoni 50' (red card) 89'; Campanal (red card) 86'	Report	35' Molowny; 83' Roque Olsen; (red card) 86' Pahiño	Stadium: Nervión; Referee: Tamarit Falaguera

21 September 1952 2	Real Madrid	2–2	Real Gijón	Madrid
	Pahiño 57'; Castulo 85' (o.g.)	Report	19' Grau; 51' Ortiz	Stadium: Estadio Santiago Bernabéu; Referee: Balcells Regue

28 September 1952 3	Real Madrid	1–2	Español	Madrid
	Joseito 1'	Report	59' Arcas; 61' Mauri	Stadium: Chamartín; Referee: Paco Bienzobas

5 October 1952 4	Valencia CF	3–2	Real Madrid	Valencia
	Segui 9'; Pasieguito 18'; Badenes 31'	Report	41' Arsuaga; 65' Olmedo	Stadium: Estadio Mestalla; Referee: Gomez Contreras

12 October 1952 5	Real Madrid	3–1	Real Valladolid	Madrid
	Pahiño 3'; Matito 20' (o.g.); Joseito 41'	Report	30' Morro	Stadium: Chamartín; Referee: Arnal Valdivieso

19 October 1952 6	Atletico Bilbao	2–2	Real Madrid	Bilbao
	Zarra 4'; Marcaida 77'	Report	31' Roque Olsen; 69' Pahiño	Stadium: San Mamés; Referee: Blanco Pérez

26 October 1952 7	Real Madrid	5–2	Deportivo La Coruña	Madrid
	Roque Olsen 6'; Pahiño 9'; Zarraga 31'; Arsuaga 55'; Joseito 87'	Report	29' Tino; 67' Tino	Stadium: Chamartín; Referee: Mendez Alonso

2 November 1952 8	Real Oviedo	3–1	Real Madrid	Oviedo
	Basabe 21'; Areta 23'; Basabe 64'	Report	35' Molowny	Stadium: Carlos Tartiere; Referee: Couso

9 November 1952 9	Real Madrid	2–0	CD Málaga	Madrid
	Olmedo 2'; Roque Olsen 62'	Report		Stadium: Chamartín; Referee: Rivero Lecuona

16 November 1952 10	Atlético Madrid	1–2	Real Madrid	Madrid
	Ben Barek 69'	Report	36' Arsuaga; Olmedo 56'	Stadium: Estadio Metropolitano; Referee: Fombona Fernandez

23 November 1952 11	Real Madrid	2–1	FC Barcelona	Madrid
	Arsuaga 76'; Arsuaga 80'		67' Manchon	Stadium: Chamartín; Referee: Blanco Perez

14 December 1952 12	Real Santander	2–3	Real Madrid	Santander
	Martinez 16'; Martinez 78'	Report	14' Joseito; 34' Pahiño; 83' Joseito	Stadium: El Sardinero; Referee: Perez Rodriguez

21 December 1952 13	Real Madrid	2–1	Real Zaragoza	Madrid
	Molowny 23'; Pahiño 81'	Report	84' Atienza	Stadium: Chamartín; Referee: Gonzalez Echeverria

4 January 1953 14	Real Sociedad	3–0	Real Madrid	San Sebastián
	Ducasse 26'; Igoa 47'; Igoa 57'	Report	28' Juan Alonso	Stadium: Estadio Atocha; Referee: Mazagatos Vicario

11 January 1953 15	Real Madrid	5–1	Celta Vigo	Madrid
	Olmedo 1'; Pahiño 20' (pen.); Pahiño 24'; Miguel Muñoz 34'; Roque Olsen 79'	Report	Torres 84'	Stadium: Chamartín; Referee: Garay

18 January 1953 16	Real Madrid	3–2	Sevilla CF	Madrid
	Pahiño 42'; Pahiño 60'; Joseito 82'	Report	20' Domenech; 41' Domenech	Stadium: Estadio Santiago Bernabéu; Referee: Arque Martin

25 January 1953 17	Real Gijón	2–1	Real Madrid	Gijón
	Sanchez 51'; Cholo Dindurra 70' (pen.); Prendes 73'	Report	59' Roque Olsen; 70' Juan Alonso	Stadium: Estadio El Molinón; Referee: Balcells Regue

1 February 1953 18	Español	2–4	Real Madrid	Barcelona
	Marcet 38'; Paseiro 42'; Marcel Domingo 45'	Report	22' Sobrado; 28' Olmedo; 34' Joseito; 44' Molowny	Stadium: Estadio Sarriá; Referee: Gonzalez Echeverria

8 February 1953 19	Real Madrid	3–0	Valencia CF	Madrid
	Molowny 35'; Joseito 55'; Sobrado 69'	Report		Stadium: Chamartín; Referee: Garay

15 February 1953 20	Real Valladolid	3–1	Real Madrid	Valladolid
	Domingo 11'; Domingo 63'; Canovas 75'	Report	29' Pahiño	Stadium: Estadio José Zorrilla; Referee: Arnal Valdivieso

22 February 1953 21	Real Madrid	3–2	Atletico Bilbao	Madrid
	Molowny 32'; Olmedo 58'; Estenaga 80' (o.g.)	Report	28' Iriondo; 82' Venancio	Stadium: Chamartín; Referee: Rivero Lecuona

1 March 1953 22	Deportivo La Coruña	0–2	Real Madrid	A Coruña
		Report	12' Pahiño; 18' Pahiño	Stadium: Estadio Riazor; Referee: Martin

8 March 1953 23	Real Madrid	3–2	Real Oviedo	Madrid
	Pahiño 34'; Roque Olsen 54'; Joseito 63'	Report	5' Areta; 64' Basabe	Stadium: Chamartín; Referee: Riñones

15 March 1953 24	CD Málaga	6–0	Real Madrid	Málaga
	Bazan 13'; Zarraga 15' (o.g.); Bazan 25'; Rodriguez 43'; Cosme 74' (o.g.); Rodriguez 88'	Report	40' Juan Alonso	Stadium: La Rosaleda; Referee: Larrea

22 March 1953 25	Real Madrid	2–0	Atlético Madrid	Madrid
	Joseito 75'; Pahiño 86'	Report		Stadium: Nuevo Chamartín; Referee: Roma

5 April 1953 26	FC Barcelona	1–0	Real Madrid	Barcelona
	Moreno 15'; Kubala (red card) 20'	Report	(red card) 20' Oliva	Stadium: Camp de Les Corts; Referee: Gardeazabal Garay

12 April 1953 27	Real Madrid	2–1	Real Santander	Madrid
	Miguel Muñoz 20'; Pahiño 65'	Report	46' Alsua	Stadium: Chamartín; Referee: Falaguera

19 April 1953 28	Real Zaragoza	0–3	Real Madrid	Zaragoza
		Report	32' Pahiño; 54' Molowny; 76' Pahiño	Stadium: La Romareda; Referee: Echeverria

26 April 1953 29	Real Madrid	5–0	Real Sociedad	Madrid
	Joseito 1'; Roque Olsen 38'; Sobrado 48'; Pahiño 54'; Roque Olsen 65'			Stadium: Chamartín; Referee: Fernandez

3 May 1953 30	Celta Vigo	2–1	Real Madrid	Vigo
	Atienza 28'; Eliseo 56'; Roque Olsen 89'	Report	89' Roque Olsen	Stadium: Estadio Balaídos; Referee: Falaguera

=== Copa del Generalísimo ===
==== Eightfinals ====
17 May 1953	Real Madrid	4–0	Real Murcia	Madrid
		Report		Stadium: Estadio Santiago Bernabéu

24 May 1953	Real Murcia	1–3	Real Madrid	Murcia
		Report

==== Quarter-finals ====
31 May 1953	Real Madrid	4–0	Real Sociedad	Madrid
		Report		Stadium: Estadio Santiago Bernabéu

4 June 1953	Real Sociedad	3–1	Real Madrid	San Sebastián
		Report		Stadium: Estadio Atocha

==== Semi-finals ====
7 June 1953	Real Madrid	2–2	Athletic Bilbao	Madrid
		Report		Stadium: Chamartín

14 June 1953	Atletico Bilbao	2–1	Real Madrid	Bilbao
		Report		Stadium: San Mamés

== Statistics ==
=== Squad statistics ===
competition	points	total						GD
competition	points	G	V	N	P	Gf	Gs	GD
1952–53 La Liga	40	30	17	6	7	72	41	+31
Copa del Generalísimo	–	6	4	1	1	14	6	+8
Total		42	36	6	10	113	55	+58

=== Players statistics ===
No.	Pos	Nat	Player	Total		1952–53 La Liga		1952–53 Copa del Generalísimo	
No.	Pos	Nat	Player	Apps	Goals	Apps	Goals	Apps	Goals
	GK	(Spain) ESP	Juan Alonso	25	-38	25	-38		
	DF	(Spain) ESP	Navarro	29	0	29	0		
	DF	(Spain) ESP	Oliva	21	0	21	0		
	DF	(Spain) ESP	Alonso	15	0	15	0		
	DF	(Spain) ESP	Zárraga	27	1	27	1		
	MF	(Spain) ESP	Olmedo	25	6	25	6		
	MF	(Spain) ESP	Miguel Muñoz	24	2	24	2		
	MF	(Argentina) ARG	Roque Olsen	23	10	23	10		
	MF	(Spain) ESP	Luis Molowny	21	7	21	7		
	FW	(Spain) ESP	Joseíto	28	11	28	11		
	FW	(Spain) ESP	Pahiño	25	19	25	19		
	GK	(Spain) ESP	Cosme	8	-11	8	-11		
	FW	(Spain) ESP	Arsuaga	15	5	15	5		
	DF	(France) FRA	Hon	13	0	13	0		
	DF	(Spain) ESP	Lesmes II	12	0	12	0		
	GK	(Spain) ESP	Adauto	0	0	0	0		
	MF	(Spain) ESP	Sobrado	7	3	7	3		
	FW	(Spain) ESP	Cabrera	3	0	3	0		
	FW	(Spain) ESP	Cedrés	1	0	1	0		
	FW	(Spain) ESP	Espina	1	0	1	0		

- Source: http://www.bdfutbol.com/en/t/t1952-532.html
