= 1940–41 Real Madrid CF season =

38th season in existence of Real Madrid CF

Real Madrid Club de Futbol
1940–41 season
- President: Adolfo Melendez (until 27 November 1940); Antonio Santos Peralba
- Manager: Francisco Bru
- Stadium: Chamartín
- Primera Division: 6th
- Copa del Generalísimo: Round of 16
- Top goalscorer: Alday (14)
Home colours	Away colours

The 1940–41 season was Real Madrid Club de Fútbol's 38th season in existence and the club's 9th consecutive season in the top flight of Spanish football.

== Summary ==
The club changed its president on 27 November 1940 with the arrival of Antonio Santos. Also, on 1 January 1941 the club changed its name from Madrid Football Club back to Real Madrid Club de Futbol, recovering its honorific title that had been stripped by the Second Spanish Republic in 1931. In spite of the transfers in of Alday and Chus Alonso, the team collapsed to the 6th spot during the final rounds under the management of Paco Bru, nine points below Champions Atletico Aviación.

== Squad ==
Note: Flags indicate national team as defined under FIFA eligibility rules; some limited exceptions apply. Players may hold more than one non-FIFA nationality.

No.	Pos.	Nation	Player
—	GK	ESP	Enrique Esquiva
—	DF	ESP	Jacinto Quincoces
—	DF	ESP	Olivares
—	MF	ESP	Ipiña
—	MF	ESP	Leoncito
—	MF	ESP	Simón Lecue
—	MF	MEX	Sauto
—	FW	ESP	Manuel Alday
—	FW	ESP	Emilio
—	FW	ESP	Sabino Barinaga
—	FW	CUB	Chus Alonso

No.	Pos.	Nation	Player
—	GK	ESP	José Luis Espinosa
—	FW	ESP	Marin
—	DF	ESP	Mardones
—	FW	ESP	Alfonso Sanz
—	FW	ESP	Pitus Prat
—	MF	ESP	Sierra
—	FW	ESP	Bracero
—	MF	ESP	Triana
—	DF	ESP	Suarez
—	FW	ESP	Cholo Dindurra

=== Transfers ===
In
Pos.	Name	from	Type
GK	Marzá		
DF	Arzanegui	Baracaldo Oriamendi	
FW	Félix Huete	Real Murcia	
FW	Botella	Levante	
DF	Nazario Belmar	Hércules CF	
DF	Moleiro	Ferroviaria	
MF	Rovira	Español	

Out
Pos.	Name	To	Type
GK	Espinosa	Real Valladolid	
FW	Marin	Granada	
FW	Prat		

== Competitions ==
=== La Liga ===
==== Position by round ====
Round	1	2	3	4	5	6	7	8	9	10	11	12	13	14	15	16	17	18	19	20	21	22
Ground	A	H	A	H	A	H	A	H	H	A	H	H	A	H	A	H	A	H	A	A	H	A
Result	D	W	L	W	W	W	L	W	L	L	W	W	W	L	L	W	W	W	L	L	L	D
Position	8	2	6	3	3	2	3	2	3	3	3	2	2	3	5	4	4	3	4	5	6	6

Source: www.lfp.es
A = Away; H = Home; W = Win; D = Draw; L = Loss

==== League table ====
Pos	Team	Pld	W	D	L	GF	GA	GD	Pts
4	Barcelona	22	13	1	8	55	45	+10	27 (Note: Valencia finished ahead of Barcelona on head-to-head goal difference: Valencia–Barcelona 3–1, Barcelona–Valencia 4–3.)
5	Sevilla	22	12	2	8	70	43	+27	26
6	Madrid FC	22	11	2	9	51	38	+13	24
7	Español	22	10	2	10	50	54	−4	22
8	Oviedo	22	7	2	13	36	63	−27	16 (Note: Oviedo finished ahead of Hércules on head-to-head goal difference: Oviedo–Hércules 6–0, Hércules–Oviedo 3–0.)

Source: BDFútbol
Rules for classification: 1) points; 2) head-to-head points; 3) head-to-head goal difference; 4) goal difference; 5) number of goals scored.

==== Matches ====
29 September 1940 1	Zaragoza	1-1	Madrid FC	Zaragoza
				Stadium: Torrero

6 October 1940 2	Madrid FC	5-3	Hércules	Chamartín de la Rosa
				Stadium: Chamartín

13 October 1940 3	Atlético Aviación	3-1	Madrid FC	Madrid
				Stadium: Campo Vallecas

20 October 1940 4	Madrid FC	4-1	Español	Chamartín de la Rosa
				Stadium: Chamartín

27 October 1940 5	Oviedo	0-2	Madrid FC	Oviedo
				Stadium: Buenavista

3 November 1940 6	Madrid FC	3-1	Celta	Chamartín de la Rosa
				Stadium: Chamartín

10 November 1940 7	Murcia	3-1	Madrid FC	Murcia
				Stadium: La Condomina

17 November 1940 8	Madrid FC	4-1	Sevilla	Chamartín de la Rosa
				Stadium: Chamartín

24 November 1940 9	Madrid FC	0-1	Atletico Bilbao	Chamartín de la Rosa
				Stadium: Chamartín

1 December 1940 10	Barcelona	3-0	Madrid FC	Barcelona
				Stadium: Camp de Les Corts

8 December 1940 11	Madrid FC	6-1	Valencia CF	Chamartín de la Rosa
				Stadium: Chamartín

15 December 1940 12	Madrid FC	6-0	Zaragoza	Chamartín de la Rosa
				Stadium: Chamartín

22 December 1940 13	Hércules CF	0-3	Madrid FC	Alicante
				Stadium: Bardin

29 December 1940 14	Madrid FC	1-4	Atlético Aviación	Chamartín de la Rosa
				Stadium: Chamartín

5 January 1941 15	Español	3-2	Real Madrid	Barcelona
				Stadium: Sarrià

21 January 1941 16	Real Madrid	1-0	Oviedo	Chamartín de la Rosa
				Stadium: Chamartín

26 January 1941 17	Celta de Vigo	1-2	Real Madrid	Vigo
				Stadium: Balaídos

2 February 1941 18	Real Madrid	2-1	Murcia	Chamartín de la Rosa
				Stadium: Chamartín

9 February 1941 19	Sevilla	5-4	Real Madrid	Seville
				Stadium: Estadio de Nervión

16 February 1941 20	Atletico Bilbao	3-1	Real Madrid	Bilbao
				Stadium: San Mamés

23 February 1941 21	Real Madrid	1-2	Barcelona	Chamartín de la Rosa
				Stadium: Chamartín

2 March 1941 22	Valencia	1-1	Real Madrid	Mestalla
				Stadium: Valencia

=== President's Cup of the Castellana Federation ===
15 June 1941	Real Madrid CF	1-0	Atlético Aviación	Chamartín de la Rosa
	Marcial Arbiza 64'	Report1; Report2		Stadium: Chamartín; Referee: Ramón Melcón

22 June 1941	Atlético Aviación	3-0	Real Madrid CF	Madrid
	Francisco Arencibia; Campos	Report1; Report2		Stadium: Campo Vallecas; Referee: Manuel Álvarez Corriols

== Statistics ==
=== Squad statistics ===
competition	points	total						GD
competition	points	G	V	N	P	Gf	Gs	GD
1940–41 La Liga	31	26	11	9	6	46	30	+16
1941 Copa del Generalísimo	–	2	0	1	1	4	5	-1
Total		28	11	10	7	50	35	+15

=== Players statistics ===
No.	Pos	Nat	Player	Total		1940–41 La Liga		1941 Copa del Generalísimo	
No.	Pos	Nat	Player	Apps	Goals	Apps	Goals	Apps	Goals
	GK	(Spain) ESP	Enrique Esquiva	17	-30	17	-30		
	DF	(Spain) ESP	Jacinto Quincoces	18	0	18	0		
	DF	(Spain) ESP	Olivares	17	0	17	0		
	MF	(Spain) ESP	Ipiña	21	1	21	1		
	MF	(Spain) ESP	Leoncito	19	0	19	0		
	MF	(Spain) ESP	Simón Lecue	18	4	18	4		
	MF	(Mexico) MEX	Sauto	17	0	17	0		
	FW	(Spain) ESP	Manuel Alday	21	14	21	14		
	FW	(Spain) ESP	Emilio	18	4	18	4		
	FW	(Spain) ESP	Sabino Barinaga	16	8	16	8		
	FW	(Cuba) CUB	Chus Alonso	14	11	14	11		
	GK	(Spain) ESP	José Luis Espinosa	5	-8	5	-8		
	FW	(Spain) ESP	Marin	8	3	8	3		
	DF	(Spain) ESP	Mardones	7	0	7	0		
	FW	(Spain) ESP	Sanz	7	4	7	4		
	FW	(Spain) ESP	Pitus Prat	5	0	5	0		
	MF	(Spain) ESP	Sierra	5	0	5	0		
	FW	(Spain) ESP	Bracero	3	1	3	1		
	MF	(Spain) ESP	Triana	2	0	2	0		
	DF	(Spain) ESP	Suarez	2	0	2	0		
	FW	(Spain) ESP	Cholo Dindurra	2	1	2	1		
