= 1908–09 Madrid FC season =

7th season in existence of Real Madrid CF

Madrid FC
1908–09 season
- President: Adolfo Meléndez
- Manager: No manager
- Stadium: No home stadium
- Madrid Regional Championship (Note: The Campeonato Regional de Madrid (Madrid Regional Championship) was a regional league used as a qualifier for the Copa del Rey.): Runners-up
- Top goalscorer: League: Buylla; Chulilla; Espinosa; Saura (1); All: Saura (3)
- Biggest win: Madrid FC 4–2 RS Gimnástica
- Biggest defeat: Athletic Madrid 2–0 Madrid FC
Home colours	Away colours

The 1908–09 season was Madrid Football Club's 7th season in existence. The club played some friendly matches against local clubs. They also played in the Campeonato Regional de Madrid (Madrid Regional Championship). Madrid FC finished runner-up in the Campeonato, and as a result, failed to qualify for the Copa del Rey for the first time since the tournament began in 1903.

== Summary ==
- 4 January: Real Madrid became one of the founding sides of the Royal Spanish Football Federation on 4 January 1909, when club president Adolfo Meléndez signed the foundation agreement of the Spanish FA.

== Friendlies ==
18 October 1908 Friendly	Madrid FC	9–0	RS Gimnástica	Av. Plaza de Toros, Madrid
		Report

1 November 1908 Friendly	Madrid FC	0–0	RS Gimnástica	Av. Plaza de Toros, Madrid
		Report		Referee: Carrasco

29 November 1908 Friendly	Madrid FC	0–1	RS Gimnástica	Av. Plaza de Toros, Madrid
		Report		Referee: Carrasco

13 December 1908 Friendly	Madrid FC	2–2	RS Gimnástica	Av. Plaza de Toros, Madrid
		Report		Referee: Zamora

27 December 1908 Friendly	Madrid FC	0–2	RS Gimnástica	Av. Plaza de Toros, Madrid
		Report		Referee: Zamora

17 January 1909 Friendly	Madrid FC	3–1	Español de Madrid	Av. Plaza de Toros, Madrid
	Neyra (?); Prast	Report	Saura	Referee: Zamora

== Competitions ==
=== Overview ===
Competition	First match	Last match	Starting round	Final position	Record							
Competition	First match	Last match	Starting round	Final position	Pld	W	D	L	GF	GA	GD	Win %
Campeonato Regional de Madrid	30 January 1909	19 March 1909	Matchday 1	Runner-up	5	3	0	2	8	7	+1	60.00
Total					5	3	0	2	8	7	+1	60.00

Source: Competitions

=== Campeonato Regional de Madrid ===
==== League table ====
Pos	Team	Pld	W	D	L	GF	GA	GD	Pts	Qualification
1	Español Madrid (C, Q)	3	3	0	0	5	1	+4	6	Qualification for the Copa del Rey
2	Athletic Madrid	3	1	0	2	5	5	0	2	
3	Madrid	3	1	0	2	4	5	−1	2	
4	RS Gimnástica	3	1	0	2	5	8	−3	2	

Source: Rec.Sport.Soccer Statistics Foundation
Rules for classification: 1) points; 2) goal difference; 3) number of goals scored.
(C) Champions; (Q) Qualified for the phase indicated

==== Matches ====
30 January 1909 1	Madrid FC	0–2	Athletic Madrid	Av. Plaza de Toros, Madrid
		Report		Referee: (England) Harper

7 February 1909 2	Madrid FC	0–1	Español de Madrid	Hipódromo, Madrid
		Report	V. Gómez	Referee: Romero

14 February 1909 3	Madrid FC	4–2	RS Gimnástica	Hipódromo, Madrid
	Buylla; Chulilla; Espinosa; Saura	Report	Navarro ???	Referee: Gondra

==== Tiebreakers ====
Español de Madrid won the Madrid Championship and qualified for the 1909 Copa del Rey. However, the remaining teams were tied on points and decided to play against each other to resolve the tie. Madrid FC won both tiebreaker matches and finished the tournament as runners-up.

28 February 1909 1	Madrid FC	2–1	RS Gimnástica	Madrid
	Saura; Didixien	Report	Castellana	Referee: (England) Harper

19 March 1909 2	Madrid FC	2–1	Athletic Madrid	Madrid
	Saura; Didixien	Report	Garcia
