= 1939–40 Madrid FC season =

37th season in existence of Real Madrid CF

Madrid Football Club
1939–40 season
- President: Adolfo Meléndez
- Manager: Francisco Bru
- Stadium: Chamartín
- Primera Division: 4th
- Campeonato Regional del Centro (Note: The Campeonato Regional del Centro (Regional Championship of the Center) was a regional league used as a qualifier for the Copa del Generalísimo.): 1st
- Copa del Generalísimo: Runners-up
- Top goalscorer: League: Manuel Alday (13); All: Manuel Alday (26)
Home colours	Away colours

The 1939–40 season was Real Madrid Club de Fútbol's 37th season in existence and the club's 8th consecutive season in the top flight of Spanish football. The club also played in the last edition of the Campeonato Regional del Centro (Regional Championship of the Center) and the Copa del Generalísimo (Generalissimo's Cup).

== Summary ==
After three seasons with no league football due to the Spanish Civil War, the Board appointed Paco Bru from Girona FC as head coach. Madrid finished fourth in the league, with Athletic Aviación winning the title. Striker Sabino Barinaga played just two matches due to an injury. Still, offensively the team played in superb fashion, with Manuel Alday scoring 17 league goals. However, the defensive line was one of the worst in the championship, sinking Madrid's chances for a title.

Meanwhile, in the Copa del Generalísimo the squad reached the final, where they were defeated by Español after extra time.

== Squad ==
Note: Flags indicate national team as defined under FIFA eligibility rules; some limited exceptions apply. Players may hold more than one non-FIFA nationality.

No.	Pos.	Nation	Player
—	GK	ESP	Enrique Esquiva
—	DF	ESP	Jacinto Quincoces
—	DF	ESP	José Mardones
—	MF	ESP	Juan Antonio Ipiña
—	MF	ESP	Leoncito
—	MF	ESP	Simón Lecue
—	MF	MEX	José Ramón Sauto
—	FW	ESP	Manuel Alday
—	FW	ESP	Emilio
—	FW	ESP	Luis Marín
—	FW	CUB	Chus Alonso

No.	Pos.	Nation	Player
—	GK	ESP	José Luis Espinosa
—	MF	ESP	Villita
—	MF	ESP	Triana
—	FW	ESP	Lopez Herranz
—	FW	ESP	Méndez Vigo
—	GK	ESP	Juan Galcerá
—	FW	ESP	Ramón Masagué
—	DF	ESP	José Tamayo
—	FW	ESP	Cholo Dindurra
—	MF	ESP	Antonio Bonet
—	FW	ESP	Sabino Barinaga

=== Transfers ===
In
Pos.	Name	from	Type
FW	Sabino Barinaga	Southampton F.C.	

Out
Pos.	Name	To	Type

== Competitions ==
=== Campeonato Regional del Centro ===
==== Position by round ====
Round	1	2	3	4	5	6	7	8	9	10
Ground	H	H	A	A	H	A	A	H	H	A
Result	W	W	W	D	W	W	W	W	L	L
Position	3	1	1	1	1	1	1	1	1	2

Source: www.lfp.es
A = Away; H = Home; W = Win; D = Draw; L = Loss

==== League table ====
	Team	Points	G	W	D	L	GF	GA
1	Athletic-Aviación	15	10	7	1	2	30	8
2	Madrid FC	15	10	7	1	2	21	12
3	A.D. Ferroviaria	13	10	5	3	2	19	15
4	U.D. Salamanca	8	10	3	2	5	13	20
5	Imperio F.C.	5	10	1	3	6	9	19
6	Valladolid C.D.	4	10	1	2	7	6	24

==== Matches ====
1 October 1939 1	Valladolid CD	1–2	Madrid FC	Valladolid
				Stadium: Estadio Jose Zorrilla

4 October 1939 2	Madrid FC	2–0	Imperio FC	Chamartín de la Rosa
				Stadium: Chamartín

12 October 1939 3	UD Salamanca	0–4	Madrid FC	Salamanca
				Stadium: Estadio Helmantico

14 October 1939 4	AD Ferroviaria	2–2	Madrid FC	Madrid
				Stadium: Estadio Ernesto Cotorruelo

22 October 1939 5	Madrid FC	2–1	Atlético Aviación	Chamartín de la Rosa
				Stadium: Chamartín

29 October 1939 6	Madrid FC	3–0	Valladolid CD	Chamartín de la Rosa
				Stadium: Chamartín

1 November 1939 7	Imperio FC	1–2	Madrid FC	Madrid
				Stadium: Campo Antonio Lopez

4 November 1939 8	Madrid FC	3–2	UD Salamanca	Chamartín de la Rosa
				Stadium: Chamartín

12 November 1939 9	Madrid FC	1–2	AD Ferroviaria	Chamartín de la Rosa
				Stadium: Chamartín

19 November 1939 10	Atlético Aviación	3–0	Madrid FC	Vallecas
				Stadium: Campo Vallecas

=== La Liga ===
==== Position by round ====
Round	1	2	3	4	5	6	7	8	9	10	11	12	13	14	15	16	17	18	19	20	21	22
Ground	H	A	H	A	H	A	H	A	H	A	H	A	H	A	H	A	H	A	H	A	H	A
Result	L	L	W	W	W	L	W	L	W	W	W	L	W	L	W	L	W	W	W	D	L	L
Position	9	12	10	8	5	7	5	7	6	5	2	3	3	4	4	4	4	3	3	3	3	4

Source: www.lfp.es
A = Away; H = Home; W = Win; D = Draw; L = Loss

==== League table ====
Pos	Team	Pld	W	D	L	GF	GA	GD	Pts
2	Sevilla	22	11	6	5	60	44	+16	28
3	Athletic Bilbao	22	11	4	7	57	44	+13	26
4	Madrid FC	22	12	1	9	47	35	+12	25
5	Español	22	11	2	9	43	43	0	24
6	Hércules	22	9	5	8	41	34	+7	23

Source: BDFútbol
Rules for classification: 1) points; 2) head-to-head points; 3) head-to-head goal difference; 4) goal difference; 5) number of goals scored.

==== Matches ====
3 December 1939 1	Madrid FC	1–3	Sevilla Football Club	Chamartín de la Rosa
		Report		Stadium: Chamartín

10 December 1939 2	Racing Club	2–1	Madrid FC	Santander
		Report		Stadium: El Sardinero

17 December 1939 3	Madrid FC	3–1	Club Deportivo Español	Chamartín de la Rosa
		Report		Stadium: Chamartín

24 December 1939 4	Club Celta	2–3	Madrid FC	Vigo
		Report		Stadium: Balaídos

31 December 1939 5	Madrid FC	2–1	Valencia Football Club	Chamartín de la Rosa
		Report		Stadium: Chamartín

5 January 1940 6	Atlético Aviación	2–1	Madrid FC	Vallecas
		Report		Stadium: Campo Vallecas

14 January 1940 7	Madrid FC	3–0	Betis Balompié	Chamartín de la Rosa
		Report		Stadium: Chamartín

21 January 1940 8	Zaragoza Football Club	3–1	Madrid FC	Zaragoza
		Report		Stadium: Campo Torrero

28 January 1940 9	Madrid FC	2–1	FC Barcelona	Chamartín de la Rosa
		Report		Stadium: Chamartín

4 February 1940 10	Hércules FC	0–2	Madrid FC	Alicante
		Report		Stadium: Bardin

11 February 1940 11	Real Madrid	4–1	Athletic Club	Chamartín de la Rosa
				Stadium: Chamartín

18 February 1940 12	Sevilla Football Club	3–2	Madrid FC	Sevilla
		Report		Stadium: Nervión

25 February 1940 13	Madrid FC	3–2	Racing Club	Chamartín de la Rosa
		Report		Stadium: Chamartín

3 March 1940 14	Club Deportivo Español	3–1	Madrid FC	Barcelona
		Report		Stadium: Sarria

10 March 1940 15	Madrid FC	2–1	Club Celta	Chamartín de la Rosa
		Report		Stadium: Chamartín

17 March 1940 16	Valencia Football Club	3–1	Madrid FC	Valencia
		Report		Stadium: Mestalla

24 March 1940 17	Madrid FC	2–0	Atlético Aviación	Chamartín de la Rosa
		Report		Stadium: Chamartín

31 March 1940 18	Betis Balompié	0–4	Madrid FC	Sevilla
		Report		Stadium: Patronato Obrero

7 April 1940 19	Madrid FC	5–1	Zaragoza Football Club	Chamartín de la Rosa
		Report		Stadium: Chamartín

14 April 1940 20	FC Barcelona	0–0	Madrid FC	Barcelona
		Report		Stadium: Camp de Les Corts

21 April 1940 21	Madrid FC	0–1	Hércules FC	Chamartín de la Rosa
		Report		Stadium: Chamartín

28 April 1940 22	Athletic Club	3–1	Real Madrid	Bilbao
		Report		Stadium: San Mamés

=== Copa del Generalísimo ===
==== Final ====
30 June 1940	CD Español	3–2 (a.e.t.)	Madrid CF	Vallecas
17:30 CET	Jorge 30', 86'; Mas 110'	Report (in Spanish)	Alonso 5'; Alday 89'	Stadium: Campo de Fútbol de Vallecas; Attendance: 20,000; Referee: Julio Ostalé

== Statistics ==
=== Squad statistics ===
competition	points	total						GD
competition	points	GP	W	D	L	GS	GA	GD
La Liga	31	22	12	1	5	49	35	+14
Copa del Generalísimo	–	3	0	2	1	4	6	-2
Total		42	36	6	10	113	55	+58

=== Players statistics ===
No.	Pos	Nat	Player	Total		La Liga		Copa	
No.	Pos	Nat	Player	Apps	Goals	Apps	Goals	Apps	Goals
	GK	(Spain) ESP	Esquiva	23	-29	14	-22	9	-7
	DF	(Spain) ESP	Jacinto Quincoces	27	0	19	0	8	0
	DF	(Spain) ESP	Mardones	31	0	22	0	9	0
	MF	(Spain) ESP	Ipiña	31	2	22	2	9	0
	MF	(Spain) ESP	Leoncito	26	0	22	0	4	0
	MF	(Spain) ESP	Simón Lecue	30	13	22	11	8	2
	MF	(Mexico) MEX	Sauto	20	0	20	0		
	FW	(Spain) ESP	Manuel Alday	27	26	19	13	8	13
	FW	(Spain) ESP	Emilio	31	9	22	7	9	2
	FW	(Spain) ESP	Luis Marín	27	3	18	2	9	1
	FW	(Cuba) CUB	Chus Alonso	24	11	15	9	9	2
	GK	(Spain) ESP	Espinosa	8	-13	8	-13		
	MF	(Spain) ESP	Villita	9	0	4	0	5	0
	MF	(Spain) ESP	Triana	3	0	3	0		
	FW	(Spain) ESP	Lopez Herranz	3	1	2	0	1	1
	FW	(Spain) ESP	Méndez Vigo	2	0	2	0		
	GK	(Spain) ESP	Galcerá	0	0	0	0		
	FW	(Spain) ESP	Masagué	2	3	2	3		
	DF	(Spain) ESP	Tamayo	3	0	2	0	1	0
	FW	(Spain) ESP	Cholo Dindurra	2	0	2	0		
	MF	(Spain) ESP	Bonet	10	0	1	0	9	0
	FW	(Spain) ESP	Sabino Barinaga	2	0	1	0	1	0
