= 1951–52 Real Madrid CF season =

49th season in existence of Real Madrid CF

Real Madrid Club de Futbol
1951–52 season
- President: Santiago Bernabéu
- Manager: Hector Scarone
- Stadium: Chamartín
- La Liga: 3rd
- Copa del Generalísimo: Quarter-finals
- Top goalscorer: Pahiño (28)
Home colours	Away colours

The 1951–52 season was Real Madrid Club de Fútbol's 49th season in existence and the club's 20th consecutive season in the top flight of Spanish football.

== Summary ==
During summer, President Santiago Bernabéu closed the arrivals of Zarraga forwards Joseíto reinforcing the offensive line and Uruguayan head coach Hector Scarone. On 30 March 1952, the team played a friendly match against Colombian side Millonarios, marking the debut of Argentine striker Alfredo Di Stéfano in front of Madrid fans, and President Santiago Bernabéu started negotiations for his transfer to the club. The squad reached a decent third place, five points below Champions CF Barcelona.

During June, the squad reached the 1952 Copa del Generalísimo semi-finals, being defeated after two matches by Valencia CF with a global score of 2–3. Pahiño clinched the first spot on the top scorers of La Liga with 28 goals.

== Squad ==
Note: Flags indicate national team as defined under FIFA eligibility rules; some limited exceptions apply. Players may hold more than one non-FIFA nationality.

No.	Pos.	Nation	Player
—	GK	(Spain) ESP	Juan Alonso
—	DF	(Spain) ESP	Gabriel Alonso
—	DF	(France) FRA	Louis Hon
—	DF	(Spain) ESP	Joaquín Navarro
—	DF	(Spain) ESP	Joaquín Oliva
—	MF	(Spain) ESP	Miguel Muñoz
—	MF	(Argentina) ARG	Roque Olsen
—	MF	(Spain) ESP	Luis Molowny
—	DF	(Spain) ESP	José María Zárraga
—	FW	(Spain) ESP	Pahiño
—	FW	(Spain) ESP	Miguel Cabrera
—	FW	(Spain) ESP	Joseíto

No.	Pos.	Nation	Player
—	GK	(Spain) ESP	Adauto Iglesias
—	MF	(Spain) ESP	José Montalvo
—	FW	(Spain) ESP	Pedro María Arsuaga
—	MF	(Spain) ESP	Jesús Narro
—	DF	(Spain) ESP	Guillermo Pont
—	DF	(Spain) ESP	Clemente Fernández
—	MF	(Spain) ESP	Eduardo Sobrado
—	FW	(Spain) ESP	Antoni Gausí
—	DF	(Spain) ESP	González

=== Transfers ===
In
Pos.	Name	from	Type
MF	Zárraga		
FW	Joseíto	Real Santander	
GK	Adauto		
DF	González	CD Málaga	
FW	Gausí	Lérida	

Out
Pos.	Name	To	Type
FW	Macala	Real Santander	
DF	Azcarate	Real Gijón	
DF	Barinaga	Real Sociedad	
MF	Jean Luciano	UD Las Palmas	

== Competitions ==
=== La Liga ===
==== League table ====
Pos	Team	Pld	W	D	L	GF	GA	GD	Pts	Qualification or relegation
1	Barcelona (C)	30	19	5	6	92	43	+49	43	Qualification for the Latin Cup
2	Atlético Bilbao	30	17	6	7	78	46	+32	40	
3	Real Madrid	30	16	6	8	79	50	+29	38	
4	Atlético Madrid	30	16	5	9	80	57	+23	37	
5	Valencia	30	15	5	10	68	51	+17	35	

Source: BDFútbol
Rules for classification: 1) Points; 2) Head-to-head results; 3) Goal difference; 4) Number of goals scored
(C) Champions

==== Position by round ====
Round	1	2	3	4	5	6	7	8	9	10	11	12	13	14	15	16	17	18	19	20	21	22	23	24	25	26	27	28	29	30
Ground	A	H	A	H	A	H	A	H	A	H	A	H	H	A	H	H	A	H	A	H	A	H	A	H	A	H	A	A	H	A
Result	W	W	L	D	L	W	L	D	W	W	D	W	W	W	W	W	D	W	D	W	L	W	L	W	L	W	D	L	W	L
Position	1	1	6	8	7	6	7	7	7	6	6	4	4	3	3	1	1	1	1	1	1	1	2	2	3	2	2	3	2	3

Source: www.lfp.es
A = Away; H = Home; W = Win; D = Draw; L = Loss; = Leader, 1952 Latin Cup

==== Matches ====
9 September 1951 1	UD Las Palmas	1–4	Real Madrid	Las Palmas de Gran Canaria
		Report		Stadium: Estadio Insular

16 September 1951 2	Real Madrid	4–2	Atletico Tetuán	Madrid
		Report		Stadium: Estadio Santiago Bernabéu

23 September 1951 3	Español	4–3	Real Madrid	Barcelona
		Report		Stadium: Estadio Sarriá

30 September 1951 4	Real Madrid	2–2	Atletico Bilbao	Madrid
		Report		Stadium: Estadio Santiago Bernabéu

7 October 1951 5	Atlético Madrid	3–2	Real Madrid	Madrid
		Report		Stadium: Metropolitano

19 October 1951 6	Real Madrid	3–1	Valencia CF	Madrid
		Report		Stadium: Estadio Santiago Bernabéu

21 October 1951 7	Real Valladolid	2–1	Real Madrid	Valladolid
		Report		Stadium: Estadio José Zorrilla

28 October 1951 8	Real Madrid	0–0	Real Sociedad	Madrid
		Report		Stadium: Chamartín

4 November 1951 9	Real Gijón	2–3	Real Madrid	Gijón
		Report		Stadium: Estadio El Molinón

11 November 1951 10	Real Madrid	5–1	FC Barcelona	Madrid
		Report		Stadium: Chamartín

18 November 1951 11	Real Zaragoza	1–1	Real Madrid	Zaragoza
		Report		Stadium: Chamartín

14 December 1951 12	Real Madrid	3–2	Real Santander	Madrid
		Report		Stadium: Chamartín

2 December 1951 13	Real Madrid	4–1	Celta Vigo	Madrid
		Report		Stadium: Chamartín

9 December 1951 14	Real Santander	0–3	Real Madrid	Santander
		Report		Stadium: Estadio El Sardinero

16 December 1951 15	Real Madrid	5–2	Sevilla CF	Madrid
		Report		Stadium: Chamartín

30 December 1951 16	Real Madrid	5–1	UD Las Palmas	Madrid
		Report		Stadium: Chamartín

6 January 1952 17	Atletico Tetuán	3–3	Real Madrid	Tétouan
		Report		Stadium: Varela

13 January 1952 18	Real Madrid	6–1	Español	Madrid
		Report		Stadium: Chamartín

20 January 1952 19	Atletico Bilbao	1–1	Real Madrid	Bilbao
		Report		Stadium: San Mames

27 January 1952 20	Real Madrid	2–1	Atlético Madrid	Madrid
		Report		Stadium: Chamartín

3 February 1952 21	Valencia CF	2–1	Real Madrid	Valencia
		Report		Stadium: Estadio Mestalla

10 February 1952 22	Real Madrid	2–0	Real Valladolid	Madrid
		Report		Stadium: Chamartín

17 February 1952 23	Real Sociedad	3–1	Real Madrid	San Sebastián
		Report		Stadium: Estadio Atocha

24 February 1952 24	Real Madrid	5–1	Real Gijón	Madrid
		Report		Stadium: Chamartín

2 March 1952 25	CF Barcelona	4–2	Real Madrid	Barcelona
		Report		Stadium: Camp de Les Corts

5 April 1952 26	Real Madrid	2–1	Real Zaragoza	Madrid
		Report		Stadium: Chamartín

16 March 1952 27	Deportivo La Coruña	1–1	Real Madrid	La Coruña
		Report		Stadium: Estadio Riazor

19 April 1952 28	Celta Vigo	3–2	Real Madrid	Vigo
		Report		Stadium: Estadio Balaídos

6 April 1952 29	Real Madrid	2–0	Real Santander	Madrid
		Report		Stadium: Chamartín

13 April 1952 30	Sevilla CF	4–1	Real Madrid	Sevilla
		Report		Stadium: Nervión

=== Copa del Generalísimo ===
==== Semi-finals ====
11 May 1952	Valencia CF	2–1	Real Madrid	Valencia
		Report		Stadium: Estadio Mestalla

18 May 1952	Real Madrid	1–1	Valencia CF	Madrid
		Report		Stadium: Chamartín

== Statistics ==
=== Squad statistics ===
competition	points	total						GD
competition	points	G	V	N	P	Gf	Gs	GD
1951–52 La Liga	40	30	17	6	7	72	41	+31
Copa del Generalísimo	–	6	4	1	1	14	6	+8
Total		42	36	6	10	113	55	+58

=== Players statistics ===
No.	Pos	Nat	Player	Total		Primera Division		1952 Copa del Generalísimo	
No.	Pos	Nat	Player	Apps	Goals	Apps	Goals	Apps	Goals
	GK	(Spain) ESP	Juan Alonso	29	-48	29	-48		
	DF	(Spain) ESP	Alonso	29	0	29	0		
	DF	(Spain) ESP	Navarro	27	1	27	1		
	DF	(Spain) ESP	Oliva	21	0	21	0		
	MF	(Spain) ESP	Miguel Muñoz	30	1	30	1		
	MF	(Argentina) ARG	Roque Olsen	30	17	30	17		
	MF	(Spain) ESP	Luis Molowny	29	15	29	15		
	DF	(Spain) ESP	Zárraga	21	1	21	1		
	FW	(Spain) ESP	Pahiño	27	28	27	28		
	FW	(Spain) ESP	Miguel Cabrera	20	3	20	3		
	FW	(Spain) ESP	Joseíto	19	5	19	5		
	GK	(Spain) ESP	Adauto	1	-2	1	-2		
	MF	(Spain) ESP	Montalvo	15	0	15	0		
	FW	(Spain) ESP	Arsuaga	10	4	10	4		
	MF	(Spain) ESP	Narro	5	1	5	1		
	DF	(France) FRA	Hon	5	0	5	0		
	DF	(Spain) ESP	Guillermo Pont	4	0	4	0		
	DF	(Spain) ESP	Clemente	3	0	3	0		
	MF	(Spain) ESP	Sobrado	3	0	3	0		
	FW	(Spain) ESP	Gausí	1	0	1	0		
	DF	(Spain) ESP	González	1	0	1	0		

- Source: http://www.bdfutbol.com/en/t/t1951-522.html
