= 1910–11 Madrid FC season =

9th season in existence of Real Madrid CF

Madrid FC
1910–11 season
- President: Adolfo Meléndez
- Manager: Arthur Johnson
- Stadium: No home stadium
- Madrid Regional Championship (Note: The Campeonato Regional de Madrid (Madrid Regional Championship) was a regional league used as a qualifier for the Copa del Rey.): Runners-up
- Top goalscorer: Saura (2)
- Biggest win: Madrid FC 3–1 RS Gimnástica
- Biggest defeat: RS Gimnástica 2–0 Madrid FC
Home colours	Away colours

The 1910–11 season was Madrid Football Club's 9th season in existence. The club played some friendly matches. They also played in the Campeonato Regional de Madrid (Madrid Regional Championship).

Arthur Johnson was appointed as manager of Madrid FC in 1910 becoming the first manager in the club's history.

== Friendlies ==
2 October 1910 Friendly	Madrid FC	1–1	RS Gimnástica	Madrid
	Alonso	Report	Espinosa	Stadium: Av. Plaza Toros

9 October 1910 Friendly	Madrid FC	0–3	RS Gimnástica	Madrid
		Report		Stadium: Av. Plaza Toros; Referee: Quintama
Note: The match was played by the second teams of both clubs.

9 October 1910 Friendly	Athletic Madrid	0–3	Madrid FC	Madrid
		Report	Alonso; Chuililla; Prast	Stadium: Retiro; Referee: Ortega

16 October 1910 Friendly	Madrid FC	5–0	Español de Madrid	Madrid
		Report	Guzmán ? Guzmán; Saura	Stadium: Av. Plaza Toros; Referee: Dieste

23 October 1910 Friendly	Madrid FC	1–3	RS Gimnástica	Madrid
	JM Kindelán	Report	Pérez 10' ? Bourbón	Stadium: Av. Plaza Toros; Referee: Heredia

30 October 1910 Friendly	Madrid FC	3–0	Athletic Madrid	Madrid
		Report		Stadium: Av. Plaza Toros; Referee: Rivera

6 November 1910 Friendly	Madrid FC	0–1	RS Gimnástica	Madrid
		Report	Espinosa	Stadium: Av. Plaza Toros; Referee: Allende

27 November 1910 Friendly	Madrid FC	3–1	Athletic Madrid	Madrid
	Saura; Prast	Report	Garnica 10'	Stadium: Av. Plaza Toros; Referee: F. Guzmán

8 December 1910 Friendly	Madrid FC	2–0	RS Gimnástica	Madrid
	Guzmán (?); Prast 90'	Report		Stadium: Av. Plaza Toros; Referee: Méndez

11 December 1910 Friendly	Madrid FC	1–2	RS Gimnástica	Madrid
Morning	Guzmán (?)	Report	Bourbon 80'; Norzagaray 88'	Stadium: Av. Plaza Toros; Referee: Garnica

11 December 1910 Friendly	Madrid FC	2–4	RS Gimnástica	Madrid
	Alonso; Menéndez	Report	Barrena; Uribarri; Peñalosa	Stadium: Av. Plaza Toros

12 February 1911 Friendly	Català Sport Club	3–2	Madrid FC	Barcelona
	Pons 43'; Casellas (?) (?)	Report	Alonso 40'; Chulilla (?)	Referee: Bru

2 April 1911 Friendly	Madrid FC	3–1	Athletic Madrid	Madrid
	Garrido; Guzmán; Garrido		Belaunde	Stadium: Av. Plaza Toros

16 April 1911 Friendly	Madrid FC	5–0	Castilla FC	Madrid
	Losada; Alonso; Bernabéu; Alonso			Stadium: Av. Plaza Toros; Referee: Rivera

=== Copa Rodriguez Arzuaga ===
11 January 1911 Copa Rodriguez Arzuaga – 3rd team	Madrid FC	1–0	Athletic Madrid	Madrid
	Garrido	Report		Stadium: Av. Plaza Toros; Referee: Sócrates Quintana
Note: The match was played by the third teams of both clubs.

29 January 1911 Copa Rodriguez Arzuaga	Madrid FC	2–1	RS Gimnástica	Madrid
	Saura	Report	?	Stadium: Av. Plaza Toros

29 January 1911 Copa Rodriguez Arzuaga – 2nd team	Madrid FC	3–1	RS Gimnástica	Madrid
		Report		Stadium: Av. Plaza Toros
Note: The match was played by the second teams of both clubs.

2 February 1911 Copa Rodriguez Arzuaga	Madrid FC	1–1	Athletic Madrid	Madrid
	Alonso	Report	Garnica	Stadium: Retiro

2 February 1911 Copa Rodriguez Arzuaga – 2nd team	Madrid FC	2–2	Athletic Madrid	Madrid
		Report		Stadium: Retiro
Note: The match was played by the second teams of both clubs.

12 February 1911 Copa Rodriguez Arzuaga – 3rd team	Madrid FC	1–1	RS Gimnástica	Madrid
	Alonso	Report	Lemmel
Note: The match was played by the third teams of both clubs.

19 February 1911 Copa Rodriguez Arzuaga – 3rd team	Madrid FC	1–0	Athletic Madrid	Madrid
	Garrido Lestache 85'	Report		Stadium: Av. Plaza Toros; Referee: Sócrates Quintana
Note: The match was played by the third teams of both clubs.

== Competitions ==
=== Overview ===
Competition	First match	Last match	Starting round	Final position	Record							
Competition	First match	Last match	Starting round	Final position	Pld	W	D	L	GF	GA	GD	Win %
Campeonato Regional de Madrid	12 March 1911	25 March 1911	Matchday 1	Runners-up	3	1	0	2	4	5	−1	33.33
Total					3	1	0	2	4	5	−1	33.33

Source: Competitions

=== Campeonato Regional de Madrid ===
12 March 1911 1	Madrid FC	3–1	RS Gimnástica	Madrid
	Guzmán; Saura	Report	Kindelán	Stadium: Av. Plaza Toros; Referee: Heredia

19 March 1911 2	RS Gimnástica	2–0	Madrid FC	Madrid
	Carruana; Espinosa			Stadium: Av. Plaza Toros; Referee: Heredia

25 March 1911 Tiebreaker	Madrid FC	1–2	RS Gimnástica	Madrid
	Prast		Bourbon; Kindelán	Stadium: Av. Plaza Toros
