= 1911–12 Madrid FC season =

10th season in existence of Real Madrid CF

Madrid FC
1911–12 season
- President: Adolfo Meléndez
- Manager: Arthur Johnson
- Stadium: No home stadium
- Biggest win: Madrid FC 6–0 English Sport Club (friendly)
- Biggest defeat: Athletic Madrid 7–1 Madrid FC (friendly)
Home colours	Away colours

The 1911–12 season was Madrid Football Club's 10th season in existence. The club only played friendly matches. The Campeonato Regional de Madrid (Madrid Regional Championship) was not held during the 1911–12 season and this was the first season in which Madrid FC did not play a single competitive match.

== Summary ==
- Santiago Bernabéu made his Madrid FC debut on 3 March 1912 when he was only 16 years old. It was in a friendly against English Sports Club, and it took place at the Pradera del Corregidor, along the Manzanares River in Madrid. The Madridista squad defeated the English side 2–1, and Bernabéu, playing as a left midfielder, scored the winning goal.

== Friendlies ==
22 October 1911 Friendly	Madrid FC	1–0	Athletic Madrid	Madrid
		Report		Stadium: Av. Plaza de Toros

29 October 1911 Friendly	RS Gimnástica	3–0	Madrid FC	Madrid
	Rafael Morales; Guzmán; Rafael Morales	Report		Stadium: Av. Plaza Toros; Referee: Heredia

5 November 1911 Friendly	Madrid FC	1–6	RS Gimnástica	Madrid
	Chuilla	Report	Morales; Peñalosa; Espinosa; Kindelán	Stadium: Av. Plaza Toros; Referee: Buylla

19 November 1911 Copa J. Ruete	Madrid FC	1–1	Athletic Madrid	Madrid
	Menéndez (?)	Report	? 87'	Stadium: Ciudad Lineal; Referee: Menéndez

26 November 1911 Copa J. Ruete – 2nd team	Madrid FC	1–7	Athletic Madrid	Madrid
		Report
Note: The match was played by the second teams of both clubs.

24 December 1911 Friendly	FC Barcelona	3–1	Madrid FC	Barcelona
	Staub 25' 55'; A. Massana (?)	Report	4' Perea	Stadium: Camp de la Indústria; Referee: Hamilton

26 December 1911 Friendly	FC Barcelona	3–3	Madrid FC	Barcelona
	Llonch; Rodríguez; Staub		??	Stadium: Camp de la Indústria; Referee: Meling

6 January 1912 Friendly	Madrid FC (Spain)	6–0	(England) English Sport Club	Madrid, Spain
				Stadium: Pradera del Corregidor

4 February 1912 Copa Rodríguez Arzuaga	Athletic Madrid	1–1	Madrid FC	Madrid
	Zuloaga	Report	Suárez	Stadium: Retiro; Referee: Menéndez

3 March 1912 Friendly	Madrid FC (Spain)	2–1	(England) English Sport Club	Madrid, Spain
	Machimbarrena; Santiago Bernabéu		Vickerstaff	Stadium: Av. Plaza de Toros
Note: Madrid FC players Losada and Menéndez played for English Sport Club in this match.

10 March 1912 Copa Rodríguez Arzuaga	Madrid FC	2–0	SE Gimnástica	Madrid
		Report		Stadium: Athletic

24 March 1912 Copa Rodríguez Arzuaga	Madrid FC	1–3	SE Gimnástica	Madrid
		Report		Stadium: Athletic

16 June 1912 Friendly	Deportivo de La Coruña	1–2	Madrid FC	A Coruña
	?	Report	? Baonza	Stadium: Monelos; Attendance: (England) Dick

16 June 1912 Friendly	Deportivo de La Coruña	4–0	Madrid FC	A Coruña
	Farral; Sindo; Broad	Report		Stadium: Monelos; Attendance: Iribarren

6 July 1912 Friendly	Madrid FC	0–1	RCD Español	Madrid
				Stadium: Campo de O'Donnell
