= List of Real Madrid CF seasons =

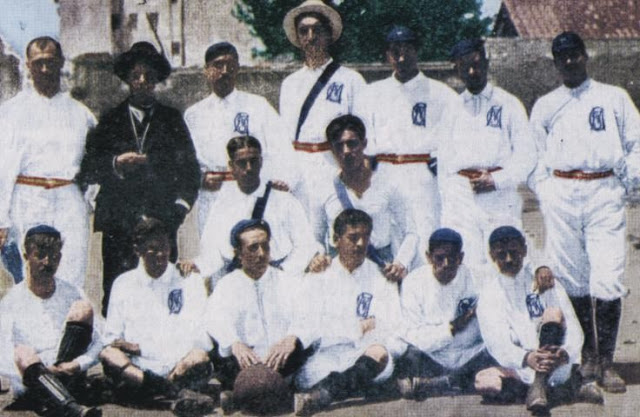
Madrid FC team in 1902

Real Madrid Club de Fútbol is a football club that plays in La Liga. The club was formed in 1902 as Madrid Football Club, and played its first competitive match on 13 May 1902, when it lost 3–1 in the semi-final of the Campeonato de Copa de S.M. Alfonso XIII against FC Barcelona. Real Madrid played against other local clubs in various regional tournaments, that served as qualifiers for the Copa del Rey, from 1902 to 1940. In 1929, the club became one of the founding members of La Liga, Spain's first national league. As of 2025, Real is one of only three clubs never to have been relegated from the top level of Spanish football, the others being Athletic Bilbao and Barcelona.

From 1902 to 1929, Real won the Copa del Rey five times and the regional championship 15 times. Real Madrid had a successful start in La Liga, finishing second in the competition's first season, and winning the league in 1932 for the first time. In the 1947–48 season, Madrid finished eleventh, which remains, as of 2025, the club's lowest final position. Real Madrid won La Liga four times and the European Cup five times during the 1950s. However, the most successful period for the club in terms of domestic titles was the 1960s, when Real Madrid won eight league championships. It won its first double of league championship and national cup in 1962. Real is also the only Spanish football team to win five consecutive titles, a feat which it has achieved on two occasions (1960–65 and 1985–90).

Real Madrid is the most successful club in UEFA competitions, winning 26. The club first participated in European competition during the 1954–55 season, when it played in the Latin Cup. It won its first major European title, and the inaugural European Cup, during the 1955–56 season. Real Madrid won the first five editions of the European Cup, and a further ten titles, the last of which was in 2024, holding the record for the most victories in the tournament. The club won the UEFA Cup during the 1984–85 season and retained the trophy the following year.

The club has won La Liga 36 times, the Copa del Rey 20 times, the Supercopa de España 13 times, the Copa de la Liga once, the Copa Eva Duarte once, the European Cup/Champions League 15 times, the UEFA Cup twice, the European/UEFA Super Cup six times, the Intercontinental Cup three times, the FIFA Intercontinental Cup once and the FIFA Club World Cup five times. The table details the club's achievements in the early regional championships and in all national and international first team competitions for each completed season since the club's formation in 1902.

The club won at least one trophy for seventeen consecutive seasons (from 1953–54 to 1969–70), a record in Spanish football. Its most recent trophy came in 2024 with the inaugural FIFA Intercontinental Cup.

== Key ==
Key to league:

- P = Played
- W = Games won
- D = Games drawn
- L = Games lost
- GF = Goals for
- GA = Goals against
- Pts = Points
- Pos = Final position

Key to divisions and rounds:

- Camp. Reg. = Campeonato Regional Centro
- W = Champions
- RU = Final (Runners-up)
- F = Final
- SF = Semi-finals
- QF = Quarter-finals
- R32/R16 = Round of 32, Round of 16 etc.
- GS = Group stage
- LP = League phase

Champions^{*}	Runners-up^{†}	Top scorer in La Liga^{‡}

== Seasons ==
Prior to 1929, Spain did not have a national football league. Real Madrid competed in the championship of the Madrid region, called Campeonato Centro, the winners of which qualified for the Copa del Rey along with the other regional champions. In 1929, La Liga, Spain's first national football league, was formed, with Real Madrid among the founder members. The club also competed in the regional championship until it was abandoned in 1940. The Copa del Rey continued alongside La Liga. Clubs continued to qualify for it based on their placings in the regional championships until 1940, when it became open to all teams in the top two divisions of the Spanish league and select other teams.

Season	Division	Pld	W	D	L	GF	GA	Pts	Pos	CdR	Competition	Result	Competition	Result	Player(s)	Goals
Season	League									CdR	Europe		Other		La Liga top scorer (Note: Only includes goals scored in La Liga.)	
1902 (Note: Real Madrid was founded in 1902 as "Madrid Foot–Ball Club".)	—	—	—	—	—	—	—	—	—	SF (Note: The 1902 Copa de la Coronación, officially Concurso Madrid de Foot-ball Association (Madrid Contest of Association Foot-ball) was a football competition in honour of the coronation of Alfonso XIII of Spain. It was an unofficial competition: the Royal Spanish Football Federation does not recognize it as the first season of the Copa del Rey, which began the following year.)	—	—	Copa de la Gran Peña (Note: Madrid defeated Espanyol for the consolation trophy after losing the Copa de la Coronación semi-finals to Barcelona.)	W^{*}	—	—
1902–03	Camp. Reg. (Note: The regional championship of Madrid was organized by the Madrid Football Federation and first held in 1903 as the "Campeonato de Madrid" (Madrid Championship). It renamed as the "Campeonato Regional de Madrid" (Madrid Regional Championship) for the 1906–13 seasons. The Royal Spanish Football Federation, founded on 29 September 1913, took over the competition from 1913. It was called the "Campeonato Regional Centro" (Central Regional Championship) between 1913 and 1931, the "Campeonato Regional Mancomunado" (Joint Regional Championship) from 1932 to 1936, and the "Campeonato Regional del Centro" (Regional Championship of the Center) during its final season in 1939–40.)	2	1	0	1	9	3	2	2nd^{†}	RU^{†}	—	—	—	—	—	—
1903–04	Camp. Reg. (Note: Madrid FC merged with Moderno FC on 30 January 1904 and contested the Campeonato de Madrid and the Copa del Rey under the name Madrid–Moderno.)	1	0	1	0	5	5	—	—	— (Note: The 1904 Copa del Rey was organized by the newly formed Madrid Football Federation. Originally, three teams were to participate, and the Federation invited Athletic Bilbao representing Biscay and Espanyol representing Catalonia. Madrid was to be represented by the winner of a preliminary round between Club Español de Madrid and Madrid-Moderno (a merger of Madrid CF and Moderno FC). The three teams were to contest the cup in a round-robin format. Before the tournament, Espanyol, unhappy with the competition system, announced they would not go to Madrid. Then two more teams from Madrid, Moncloa FC and Iberia Football Club, were admitted in the competition, forcing a change to the schedule. As a result, the four Madrid teams were scheduled to play a single-elimination tournament to decide their representative for the Copa del Rey final against automatically qualified Athletic Bilbao. The semi-final qualifying match between Club Español de Madrid and Madrid-Moderno ended in 5–5 draw. The captains of both teams agreed not to play extra time, but failed to reach an agreement on when they should replay the match. Español wanted to play the next day, but Madrid-Moderno refused, citing the rules of the tournament which stated that a replay could not be played less than 48 hours after the previous game. The next day Club Español went to replay the match, but Madrid-Moderno did not appear. The regional federation, whose president Ceferino Birdalone happened to be president of Club Español as well, ruled in favor of Español, and they were declared winners of the match eliminating Madrid FC from the competition.)	—	—	—	—	—	—
1904–05	Camp. Reg.	1 (Note: The match only lasted thirty-five minutes, as the opposing team left the field upset with the refereeing.)	1	0	0	2	0	—	W^{*}	W^{*}	—	—	—	—	—	—
1905–06	Camp. Reg.	1	1	0	0	7	0	—	W^{*}	W^{*}	—	—	—	—	—	—
1906–07	Camp. Reg.	5	4	0	1	15	7	—	W^{*} (Note: Madrid FC won the tournament, but the federation annulled the results.)	W^{*}	—	—	—	—	—	—
1907–08	Camp. Reg.	6	4	1	1	15	4	9	W^{*}	W^{*}	—	—	—	—	—	—
1908–09	Camp. Reg.	3	1	0	2	4	5	2	3rd	—	—	—	—	—	—	—
1909–10	Camp. Reg.	4	1	1	2	4	7	3	3rd (Note: The qualification tournament for participating in the Copa del Rey was won by Español de Madrid. There are no statistics for the matches played by Madrid F.C. but the club took part, at Berraondo's wish, in the championship organised by the Unión Española de Clubs.)	3rd (Note: In 1910, two competitions were played. The Federación Española de Fútbol was created, but various disagreements between 1909 cup winners Ciclista San Sebastián and other clubs surfaced; when no satisfactory agreement could be reached, the championship of the so-called Unión Española de Clubes de Fútbol (UECF) was played in San Sebastián and that of the Federación Española de Fútbol (FEF) in Madrid. Madrid FC played in Unión Española de Clubes de Fútbol Cup (Copa UECF).)	—	—	—	—	—	—
1910–11	Camp. Reg. (Note: Madrid and Gimnástica disputed the option to represent Madrid in the Copa del Rey. RS Gimnástica won the 1910–11 Campeonato de Madrid and participated in the Copa del Rey, representing Madrid CF.)	3	1	0	2	4	4	—	2nd^{†}	—	—	—	—	—	—	—
1911–12	Camp. Reg. (Note: Statistics about the competition are not available. However, RS Gimnástica are regarded as champions.)	—	—	—	—	—	—	—	—	—	—	—	—	—	—	—
1912–13	Camp. Reg.	3	2	1	0	9	3	5	W^{*}	SF	—	—	—	—	—	—
1913–14	Camp. Reg. (Note: In 1913, Campeonato de Madrid changed its name to Campeonato Regional de Madrid, following the takeover by the Royal Spanish Football Federation. The competition included teams from Castile and León.)	4	1	1	2	3	5	3	3rd	—	—	—	—	—	—	—
1914–15	Camp. Reg.	6	1	3	2	10	12	5	3rd	—	—	—	—	—	—	—
1915–16	Camp. Reg.	6	5	0	1	15	5	10	W^{*}	RU^{†}	—	—	—	—	—	—
1916–17	Camp. Reg.	6	6	0	0	28	8	12	W^{*}	W^{*}	—	—	—	—	—	—
1917–18	Camp. Reg.	6	5	0	1	13	8	10	W^{*}	RU^{†}	—	—	—	—	—	—
1918–19	Camp. Reg.	8	5	1	2	20	15	11	2nd^{†}	—	—	—	—	—	—	—
1919–20	Camp. Reg.	6	4	1	1	17	7	9	W^{*}	QF	—	—	—	—	—	—
1920–21 (Note: In 1920, the club received sponsorship of King Alfonso XIII, and changed its name to "Real Madrid FC".)	Camp. Reg.	6	2	1	3	14	9	5	3rd	—	—	—	—	—	—	—
1921–22	Camp. Reg.	6	5	1	0	28	5	11	W^{*}	SF	—	—	—	—	—	—
1922–23	Camp. Reg.	6	3	2	1	12	9	8	W^{*}	QF	—	—	—	—	—	—
1923–24	Camp. Reg.	8	6	2	0	21	7	14	W^{*}	RU^{†}	—	—	—	—	—	—
1924–25	Camp. Reg.	8	3	3	2	11	6	9	2nd^{†}	—	—	—	—	—	—	—
1925–26	Camp. Reg.	8	6	1	1	17	5	13	W^{*}	QF	—	—	—	—	—	—
1926–27	Camp. Reg.	16	12	1	3	38	12	25	W^{*}	SF	—	—	—	—	—	—
1927–28	Camp. Reg.	10	8	0	2	38	10	16	RU^{†} (Note: Real Madrid finished level on points with Athletic Madrid and Racing Madrid and the three teams were ordered to play each other. Real Madrid won 4–0 against Racing Madrid, but lost 3–1 against Athletic Madrid.)	QF	—	—	—	—	—	—
1928–29	La Liga Camp. Reg.	18 8	11 7	1 1	6 0	40 30	27 8	23 15	2nd^{†} W^{*}	RU^{†}	—	—	—	—	Rubio	12
1929–30	La Liga Camp. Reg.	18 8	7 5	3 1	8 2	45 24	42 12	17 11	5th W^{*}	RU^{†}	—	—	—	—	Rubio	18
1930–31	La Liga Camp. Reg.	18 10	7 9	4 1	7 0	24 34	27 10	18 19	6th W^{*}	QF	—	—	—	—	Lazcano	5
1931–32 (Note: In 1931, the club was forced to revert to its old name "Madrid FC" after the arrival of the Second Spanish Republic.)	La Liga Camp. Reg. (Note: In the 1931–32 season, the Campeonato Regional de Madrid changed its name to Campeonato Regional Mancomunado Centro–Aragón. The competition included teams from Aragon and Castile and León.)	18 10	10 8	8 1	0 1	37 40	15 8	28 17	1st^{*} W^{*}	R16	—	—	—	—	Olivares	11
1932–33	La Liga Camp. Reg. (Note: In the 1932–34 period, the Campeonato Regional Mancomunado Centro–Aragón became Campeonato Regional Mancomunado Centro–Sur. The competition included teams from Andalusia and Castile and León.)	18 10	13 9	2 0	3 1	49 38	17 7	28 18	1st^{*} W^{*}	RU^{†}	—	—	—	—	Olivares	15^{‡}
1933–34	La Liga Camp. Reg.	18 10	10 7	2 2	6 1	41 35	29 11	22 16	2nd^{†} W^{*}	W^{*}	—	—	—	—	Regueiro	12
1934–35	La Liga Camp. Reg. (Note: In the 1934–36 period, the Campeonato Regional Mancomunado Centro–Sur changed its name to Campeonato Regional Mancomunado Castilla–Aragón. The competition included teams from Aragon, Cantabria and Castile and León.)	22 12	16 10	1 0	5 2	61 41	34 13	33 20	2nd^{†} W^{*}	R16	—	—	—	—	Sañudo	20
1935–36	La Liga Camp. Reg.	22 10	13 6	3 3	6 1	62 23	35 8	29 15	2nd^{†} W^{*}	W^{*}	—	—	—	—	Sañudo	20
No competitive football was played between 1936 and 1939 due to the Spanish Civil War.
1939–40	La Liga Camp. Reg. (Note: In 1939, the Campeonato Regional Mancomunado Castilla–Aragón changed its name to Campeonato Regional del Centro. The competition included teams from Castile and León. In 1940, it was discontinued in favor of a full-season La Liga.)	18 10	11 7	1 1	6 2	40 21	27 12	23 15	4th 2nd^{†}	RU^{†}	—	—	—	—	Alday	13
1940–41 (Note: In 1941, the club recovered its honorific name "Real Madrid CF" following the Nationalist victory in the Spanish Civil War.)	La Liga	22	11	2	9	51	38	24	6th	R16	—	—	—	—	Alday	14
1941–42	La Liga	26	14	5	7	65	43	33	2nd^{†}	QF	—	—	—	—	Alday	23
1942–43	La Liga	26	10	5	11	52	50	25	10th	RU^{†}	—	—	—	—	Alday	16
1943–44	La Liga	26	11	6	9	48	38	28	7th	R16	—	—	—	—	Barinaga	20
1944–45	La Liga	26	18	2	6	68	35	38	2nd^{†}	R16	—	—	—	—	Barinaga	18
1945–46	La Liga	26	11	9	6	46	30	31	4th	W^{*}	—	—	—	—	Pruden	20
1946–47	La Liga	26	11	5	10	62	56	27	7th	W^{*}	—	—	—	—	Pruden	22
1947–48	La Liga	26	7	7	12	41	56	21	11th	R16	—	—	Copa Eva Duarte	W^{*}	Molowny	9
1948–49	La Liga	26	15	4	7	67	42	34	3rd	R16	—	—	—	—	Pahiño	21
1949–50	La Liga	26	11	9	6	60	49	31	4th	SF	—	—	—	—	Pahiño	19
1950–51	La Liga	30	13	5	12	80	71	31	9th	SF	—	—	—	—	Pahiño	21
1951–52	La Liga	30	16	6	8	79	50	38	3rd	SF	—	—	—	—	Pahiño	28^{‡}
1952–53	La Liga	30	18	3	9	67	49	39	3rd	SF	—	—	—	—	Pahiño	19
1953–54	La Liga	30	17	6	7	72	41	40	1st^{*}	SF	—	—	— (Note: Real Madrid would have qualified for the annual Latin Cup as league champions, but the tournament was scrapped due to fixture congestion amid the 1954 FIFA World Cup.)	—	Di Stéfano	27^{‡}
1954–55	La Liga	30	20	6	4	80	31	46	1st^{*}	SF	—	—	Latin Cup	W^{*}	Di Stéfano	25
1955–56	La Liga	30	18	2	10	81	39	38	3rd	SF	European Cup	W^{*}	—	—	Di Stéfano	24^{‡}
1956–57	La Liga	30	20	4	6	74	35	44	1st^{*}	QF	European Cup	W^{*}	Latin Cup	W^{*}	Di Stéfano	31^{‡}
1957–58	La Liga	30	20	5	5	71	26	45	1st^{*}	RU^{†}	European Cup	W^{*}	—	—	Di Stéfano	19^{‡}
1958–59	La Liga	30	21	5	4	89	29	47	2nd^{†}	SF	European Cup	W^{*}	—	—	Di Stéfano	23^{‡}
1959–60	La Liga	30	21	4	5	92	36	46	2nd^{†}	RU^{†}	European Cup	W^{*}	—	—	Puskás	25^{‡}
1960–61	La Liga	30	24	4	2	89	25	52	1st^{*}	RU^{†}	European Cup	R16	Intercontinental Cup	W^{*}	Puskás	28^{‡}
1961–62	La Liga	30	19	5	6	58	24	43	1st^{*}	W^{*}	European Cup	RU^{†}	—	—	Puskás	20
1962–63	La Liga	30	23	3	4	83	33	49	1st^{*}	SF	European Cup	R32	—	—	Puskás	26^{‡}
1963–64	La Liga	30	22	2	6	61	23	46	1st^{*}	QF	European Cup	RU^{†}	—	—	Puskás	21^{‡}
1964–65	La Liga	30	21	5	4	64	18	47	1st^{*}	R16	European Cup	QF	—	—	Grosso	17
1965–66	La Liga	30	19	5	6	53	30	43	2nd^{†}	QF	European Cup	W^{*}	—	—	Grosso	11
1966–67	La Liga	30	19	9	2	58	22	47	1st^{*}	QF	European Cup	QF	Intercontinental Cup	RU^{†}	Gento	11
1967–68	La Liga	30	16	10	4	55	26	42	1st^{*}	RU^{†}	European Cup	SF	—	—	Amancio, Pirri, Velázquez	10
1968–69	La Liga	30	18	11	1	46	21	47	1st^{*}	R16	European Cup	R16	—	—	Amancio	14^{‡}
1969–70	La Liga	30	13	9	8	50	42	35	5th	W^{*}	European Cup	R16	—	—	Amancio	16^{‡}
1970–71	La Liga	30	17	7	6	46	24	41	4th	R32	Cup Winners' Cup	RU^{†}	—	—	Pirri	13
1971–72	La Liga	34	19	9	6	51	27	47	1st^{*}	SF	UEFA Cup	R32	—	—	Pirri	11
1972–73	La Liga	34	17	9	8	45	29	43	4th	R16	European Cup	SF	—	—	Santillana	10
1973–74	La Liga	34	13	8	13	48	38	34	8th	W^{*}	UEFA Cup	R64	—	—	Más	11
1974–75	La Liga	34	20	10	4	66	34	50	1st^{*}	W^{*}	Cup Winners' Cup	QF	—	—	Santillana	17
1975–76	La Liga	34	20	8	6	54	26	48	1st^{*}	R16	European Cup	SF	—	—	Pirri	13
1976–77	La Liga	34	12	10	12	57	53	34	9th	R32	European Cup	R16	—	—	Santillana	12
1977–78	La Liga	34	22	3	9	77	40	47	1st^{*}	R16	—	—	—	—	Santillana	24
1978–79	La Liga	34	16	15	3	61	36	47	1st^{*}	RU^{†}	European Cup	R16	—	—	Santillana	18
1979–80	La Liga	34	22	9	3	70	33	53	1st^{*}	W^{*}	European Cup	SF	—	—	Santillana	23
1980–81	La Liga	34	20	5	9	66	37	45	2nd^{†}	QF	European Cup	RU^{†}	—	—	Juanito	19
1981–82	La Liga	34	18	8	8	57	34	44	3rd	W^{*}	UEFA Cup	QF	—	—	Juanito, Santillana, Stielike	9
1982–83	La Liga	34	20	9	5	57	25	49	2nd^{†}	RU^{†}	Cup Winners' Cup	RU^{†}	Supercopa de España League Cup	RU^{†} RU^{†}	Pineda	11
1983–84	La Liga	34	22	5	7	59	37	49	2nd^{†}	SF	UEFA Cup	R64	League Cup	R32	Juanito	17^{‡}
1984–85	La Liga	34	13	10	11	46	36	36	5th	R16	UEFA Cup	W^{*}	League Cup	W^{*}	Valdano	17
1985–86	La Liga	34	26	4	4	83	33	56	1st^{*}	SF	UEFA Cup	W^{*}	League Cup	R16	Sánchez	22^{‡}
1986–87	La Liga	44	27	12	5	84	37	66	1st^{*}	SF	European Cup	SF	— (Note: Real Madrid qualified to play Zaragoza for the Supercopa de España but the game was not arranged.)	—	Sánchez	34^{‡}
1987–88	La Liga	38	28	6	4	95	26	62	1st^{*}	SF	European Cup	SF	— (Note: Real Madrid qualified to play Real Sociedad for the Supercopa de España but the game was not arranged.)	—	Sánchez	29^{‡}
1988–89	La Liga	38	25	12	1	91	37	62	1st^{*}	W^{*}	European Cup	SF	Supercopa de España	W^{*}	Sánchez	27
1989–90	La Liga	38	26	10	2	107	38	62	1st^{*}	RU^{†}	European Cup	R16	Supercopa de España (Note: Real Madrid automatically received the trophy as it won the league championship and Copa del Rey double.)	W^{*}	Sánchez	38^{‡} (Note: Sánchez was La Liga top scorer (38 goals) and won the European Golden Shoe.)
1990–91	La Liga	38	20	6	12	63	37	46	3rd	R16	European Cup	QF	Supercopa de España	W^{*}	Butragueño	19^{‡}
1991–92	La Liga	38	23	8	7	78	32	54	2nd^{†}	RU^{†}	UEFA Cup	SF	—	—	Hierro	21
1992–93	La Liga	38	24	9	5	75	28	57	2nd^{†}	W^{*}	UEFA Cup	QF	—	—	Zamorano	26
1993–94	La Liga	38	19	7	12	61	50	45	4th	QF	Cup Winners' Cup	QF	Copa Iberoamericana Supercopa de España	W^{*} W^{*}	Zamorano	26
1994–95	La Liga	38	23	9	6	76	29	55	1st^{*}	R16	UEFA Cup	R16	—	—	Zamorano	28^{‡}
1995–96	La Liga	42	20	10	12	75	51	70	6th	R16	Champions League	QF	Supercopa de España	RU^{†}	Raúl	19
1996–97	La Liga	42	27	11	4	85	36	92	1st^{*}	R16	—	—	—	—	Suker	24
1997–98	La Liga	38	17	12	9	63	45	63	4th	R16	Champions League	W^{*}	Supercopa de España	W^{*}	Morientes	12
1998–99	La Liga	38	21	5	12	77	62	68	2nd^{†}	SF	Champions League	QF	UEFA Super Cup Intercontinental Cup	RU^{†} W^{*}	Raúl	25^{‡}
1999–2000	La Liga	38	16	14	8	58	48	62	5th	SF	Champions League	W^{*}	FIFA Club World Championship	4th	Raúl	17
2000–01	La Liga	38	24	8	6	81	40	80	1st^{*}	R64	Champions League	SF	UEFA Super Cup Intercontinental Cup	RU^{†} RU^{†}	Raúl	24^{‡}
2001–02	La Liga	38	19	9	10	69	44	66	3rd	RU^{†}	Champions League	W^{*}	Supercopa de España	W^{*}	Morientes	18
2002–03	La Liga	38	22	12	4	86	42	78	1st^{*}	QF	Champions League	SF	UEFA Super Cup Intercontinental Cup	W^{*} W^{*}	Ronaldo	23
2003–04	La Liga	38	21	7	10	72	54	70	4th	RU^{†}	Champions League	QF	Supercopa de España	W^{*}	Ronaldo	24^{‡}
2004–05	La Liga	38	25	5	8	71	32	80	2nd^{†}	R16	Champions League	R16	—	—	Ronaldo	21
2005–06	La Liga	38	20	10	8	70	40	70	2nd^{†}	SF	Champions League	R16	—	—	Ronaldo	14
2006–07	La Liga	38	23	7	8	66	40	76	1st^{*}	R16	Champions League	R16	—	—	Van Nistelrooy	25^{‡}
2007–08	La Liga	38	27	4	7	84	36	85	1st^{*}	R16	Champions League	R16	Supercopa de España	RU^{†}	Raúl	18
2008–09	La Liga	38	25	3	10	83	52	78	2nd^{†}	R32	Champions League	R16	Supercopa de España	W^{*}	Higuaín	22
2009–10	La Liga	38	31	3	4	102	35	96	2nd^{†}	R32	Champions League	R16	—	—	Higuaín	27
2010–11	La Liga	38	29	5	4	102	33	92	2nd^{†}	W^{*}	Champions League	SF	—	—	Cristiano Ronaldo	40^{‡} (Note: Cristiano Ronaldo was La Liga top scorer (40 goals) and won the European Golden Shoe.)
2011–12	La Liga	38	32	4	2	121	32	100	1st^{*}	QF	Champions League	SF	Supercopa de España	RU^{†}	Cristiano Ronaldo	46
2012–13	La Liga	38	26	7	5	103	42	85	2nd^{†}	RU^{†}	Champions League	SF	Supercopa de España	W^{*}	Cristiano Ronaldo	34
2013–14	La Liga	38	27	6	5	104	38	87	3rd	W^{*}	Champions League	W^{*}	—	—	Cristiano Ronaldo	31^{‡} (Note: Cristiano Ronaldo was La Liga top scorer (31 goals) and won the European Golden Shoe (shared with Luis Suárez).)
2014–15	La Liga	38	30	2	6	118	38	92	2nd^{†}	R16	Champions League	SF	UEFA Super Cup Supercopa de España FIFA Club World Cup	W^{*} RU^{†} W^{*}	Cristiano Ronaldo	48^{‡} (Note: Cristiano Ronaldo was La Liga top scorer (48 goals) and won the European Golden Shoe.)
2015–16	La Liga	38	28	6	4	110	34	90	2nd^{†}	R32 (Note: Real Madrid were disqualified from the competition after accidentally fielding an ineligible player in the first leg of the round of 32.)	Champions League	W^{*}	—	—	Cristiano Ronaldo	35
2016–17	La Liga	38	29	6	3	106	41	93	1st^{*}	QF	Champions League	W^{*}	UEFA Super Cup FIFA Club World Cup	W^{*} W^{*}	Cristiano Ronaldo	25
2017–18	La Liga	38	22	10	6	94	44	76	3rd	QF	Champions League	W^{*}	UEFA Super Cup Supercopa de España FIFA Club World Cup	W^{*} W^{*} W^{*}	Cristiano Ronaldo	26
2018–19	La Liga	38	21	5	12	63	46	68	3rd	SF	Champions League	R16	UEFA Super Cup FIFA Club World Cup	RU^{†} W^{*}	Benzema	21
2019–20	La Liga	38	26	9	3	70	25	87	1st^{*}	QF	Champions League	R16	Supercopa de España	W^{*}	Benzema	21
2020–21	La Liga	38	25	9	4	67	28	84	2nd^{†}	R32	Champions League	SF	Supercopa de España	SF	Benzema	23
2021–22	La Liga	38	26	8	4	80	31	86	1st^{*}	QF	Champions League	W^{*}	Supercopa de España	W^{*}	Benzema	27^{‡}
2022–23	La Liga	38	24	6	8	75	36	78	2nd^{†}	W^{*}	Champions League	SF	UEFA Super Cup Supercopa de España FIFA Club World Cup	W^{*} RU^{†} W^{*}	Benzema	19
2023–24	La Liga	38	29	8	1	87	26	95	1st^{*}	R16	Champions League	W^{*}	Supercopa de España	W^{*}	Bellingham	19
2024–25	La Liga	38	26	6	6	78	38	84	2nd^{†}	RU^{†}	Champions League	QF	UEFA Super Cup Supercopa de España FIFA Intercontinental Cup FIFA Club World Cup	W^{*} RU^{†} W^{*} SF	Mbappé	31^{‡} (Note: Kylian Mbappé was La Liga top scorer (31 goals) and won the European Golden Shoe.)
2025–26	La Liga	38	27	5	6	77	35	86	2nd^{†}	R16	Champions League	QF	Supercopa de España	RU^{†}	Mbappé	25^{‡}
2026–27	La Liga	0	0	0	0	0	0	0	TBD	TBD	Champions League	TBD	Supercopa de España	TBD	TBD	
