= 1913–14 Madrid FC season =

12th season in existence of Real Madrid CF

Madrid FC
1913–14 season
- President: Adolfo Meléndez
- Manager: Arthur Johnson
- Stadium: Campo de O'Donnell
- Campeonato Regional Centro (Note: The Campeonato Regional Centro (Central Regional Championship) was a regional league used as a qualifier for the Copa del Rey.): 3rd
- Top goalscorer: Saura (2)
- Biggest win: Madrid FC 2–0 Athletic Madrid
- Biggest defeat: RS Gimnástica 2–0 Madrid FC; Athletic Madrid 2–0 Madrid FC
Home colours	Away colours

The 1913–14 season was Madrid Football Club's 12th season in existence. The club played some friendly matches. They also played in the Campeonato Regional Centro (Central Regional Championship).

== Competitions ==
=== Overview ===
Competition	First match	Last match	Starting round	Final position	Record							
Competition	First match	Last match	Starting round	Final position	Pld	W	D	L	GF	GA	GD	Win %
Campeonato Regional Centro	16 November 1913	22 February 1914	Matchday 1	3rd	4	1	1	2	3	5	−2	25.00
Total					4	1	1	2	3	5	−2	25.00

Source: Competitions

=== Campeonato Regional Centro ===
==== League table ====
Pos	Team	Pld	W	D	L	GF	GA	GD	Pts	Qualification
1	RS Gimnástica (C, Q)	4	2	2	0	5	2	+3	6	Qualification for the Copa del Rey
2	Athletic Madrid	4	1	1	2	3	4	−1	3	
3	Madrid	4	1	1	2	3	5	−2	3	

Source: Rec.Sport.Soccer Statistics Foundation
Rules for classification: 1) points; 2) goal difference; 3) number of goals scored.
(C) Champions; (Q) Qualified for the phase indicated

==== Matches ====
16 November 1913 1	Madrid FC	2–0	Athletic Madrid	Madrid
	Saura			Stadium: Campo de O'Donnell; Referee: Carrasco

23 November 1913 2	RS Gimnástica	2–0	Madrid FC	Madrid
	Espinosa 3', (?)			Stadium: Campo de Gimnástica; Referee: Julián Ruete

25 January 1914 3	Athletic Madrid	2–0	Madrid FC	Madrid
	E. Bueno			Stadium: Campo de Vallecas; Referee: Espinosa

22 February 1914 4	Madrid FC	1–1	RS Gimnástica	Madrid
	Torena		Espinosa	Stadium: Campo de O'Donnell; Referee: Julián Ruete

== Friendlies ==
5 October 1913 Friendly	Madrid FC (Spain)	5–1	(France) Vie au Grand Air du Médoc	Madrid, Spain
	Rodríguez–Eguinoa; S. Bernabéu,,,	Report	Hrefer	Stadium: Campo de O'Donnell; Referee: Francisco Torrens

12 October 1913 Friendly	Madrid FC	1–0	Athletic Madrid	Madrid
	S. Bernabéu	Report		Stadium: Campo de O'Donnell; Referee: Alfonso Albéniz

12 October 1913 Friendly – 2nd team	Madrid FC	3–1	Athletic Madrid	Madrid
		Report		Stadium: Campo de O'Donnell
Note: The match was played by the second teams of both clubs.

19 October 1913 Friendly	Madrid FC	0–2	RS Gimnástica	Madrid
		Report		Stadium: Campo de O'Donnell; Referee: Alfonso Albéniz

19 October 1913 Friendly – 2nd team	Madrid FC	3–1	RS Gimnástica	Madrid
		Report		Stadium: Campo de O'Donnell
Note: The match was played by the second teams of both clubs.

19 October 1913 Friendly – 3rd team	Madrid FC	4–4	RS Gimnástica	Madrid
		Report		Stadium: Campo de O'Donnell
Note: The match was played by the third teams of both clubs.

26 October 1913 Friendly	RS Gimnástica	1–5	Madrid FC	Madrid
	Espinosa	Report	Rodríguez–Eguinoa; Albéniz,, Vickerstaff	Stadium: Campo de Princesa; Referee: Julián Ruete

1 November 1913 Friendly	FC Barcelona	7–0	Madrid FC	Barcelona
		Report		Stadium: Camp de la Indústria; Referee: Hodge

1 November 1913 Friendly	FC Barcelona	1–0	Madrid FC	Barcelona
	Alcántara 40'	Report		Stadium: Camp de la Indústria; Referee: Hamilton

30 November 1913 Friendly	Academia de Infanteria Toledo	1–6	Madrid FC	Madrid
		Report		Stadium: Campo de Tiro; Referee: Carcer

8 December 1913 Friendly	Madrid FC	1–1	RCD Español	Madrid
		Report		Stadium: Campo de O'Donnell; Referee: Carruana

14 December 1913 Friendly	Madrid FC	2–3	RS Gimnástica	Madrid
		Report		Stadium: Campo de O'Donnell; Referee: Ruete

14 December 1913 Friendly – 2nd team	Madrid FC	1–0	IC Ciseneros	Madrid
		Report		Stadium: Campo de O'Donnell

14 December 1913 Friendly – 2nd team	Madrid FC	2–2	Unión Sporting	Madrid
		Report		Stadium: Campo de O'Donnell

6 January 1914 Friendly	Madrid FC	2–2	FC Barcelona	Madrid
	S. Bernabéu	Report	Wallace; Greenwell	Stadium: Campo de O'Donnell; Referee: Ruete

11 January 1914 Friendly	Madrid FC	0–2	FC Barcelona	Madrid
		Report	Allack; Alcántara	Stadium: Campo de O'Donnell; Referee: Valls

3 March 1914 Friendly	Madrid FC	1–0	Arenas Getxo	Madrid
	M. Bernabéu	Report		Stadium: Campo de O'Donnell; Referee: Ruete

8 March 1914 Friendly	RS Gimnástica	1–2	Madrid FC	Madrid
	Espinosa	Report	Saura; Juantorena	Stadium: Princesa; Referee: Menéndez

15 March 1914 Charity match	Madrid FC	5–2	AC Infanteria Toledo	Madrid
		Report		Stadium: Campo de O'Donnell; Referee: Dieste

2 May 1914 Friendly	Escorial FC	3–1	Madrid FC	El Escorial
	Posada 20', 55'; Teijeiro (?)	Report	Casanova 40'	Stadium: La Lonja; Referee: Victorero

=== Copa Espuñes ===
13 April 1914 Copa Espuñes	RS Gimnástica	1–1	Madrid FC	Madrid
	JA Kindelán 5'	Report	Juantorena (?)	Stadium: Princesa

19 April 1914 Copa Espuñes	Madrid FC	3–3	Athletic Madrid	Madrid
	Rodríguez-Eguinoa; Juantorena; Saura 90'	Report	M. Belaunde; L. Belaunde	Stadium: Campo de O'Donnell

10 May 1914 Copa Espuñes	Madrid FC	1–3	RS Gimnástica	Madrid
	Rodríguez-Eguinoa; Juantorena; Saura 90'	Report	M. Belaunde; L. Belaunde	Stadium: Campo de O'Donnell
