= 1920–21 Real Madrid CF season =

19th season in existence of Real Madrid CF

Real Madrid
1920–21 season
- President: Pedro Parages
- Manager: Juan de Cárcer
- Stadium: Campo de O'Donnell
- Campeonato Regional Centro (Note: The Campeonato Regional Centro (Central Regional Championship) was a regional league used as a qualifier for the Copa del Rey.): 3rd
- Top goalscorer: L. Torrado (5)
- Biggest win: RS Gimnástica 1–7 Real Madrid
- Biggest defeat: Athletic Madrid 2–0 Real Madrid
Home colours	Away colours

The 1920–21 season was Real Madrid Club de Fútbol's 19th season in existence. The club played some friendly matches. They also played in the Campeonato Regional Centro (Central Regional Championship).

== Summary ==
King Alfonso XIII granted Madrid Football Club the title "Real" (Spanish for "royal") on 29 June 1920. The High Steward of the monarch sent a letter to club president Pedro Parages stating, "His Majesty the King, has served to grant with the greatest satisfaction the Title of Royal, to this Football Club of which you are worthy President, which, from now on, will be able to prevail over your name. I hereby inform you of the above and of the consequences thereof." The royal patronage permitted the club to add the royal crown to its crest and subsequently Madrid Football Club was renamed Real Madrid Football Club.

== Friendlies ==
19 September 1920 Friendly	Real Madrid	1–0	Unión SC	Madrid
		Report		Stadium: Campo de O'Donnell

24 September 1920 Friendly	Real Madrid	0–0	Real Betis Balompié	Madrid
		Report		Stadium: Campo de O'Donnell

26 September 1920 Friendly	Real Madrid	0–1	Real Betis Balompié	Madrid
		Report		Stadium: Campo de O'Donnell

3 October 1920 Friendly	Real Madrid	0–2	Racing de Madrid	Madrid
		Report		Stadium: Campo de O'Donnell

5 November 1920 Friendly	Real Madrid	4–1	Real Stadium (Oviedo)	Madrid
		Report		Stadium: Campo de O'Donnell

8 December 1920 Friendly	Real Madrid	2–0	Racing de Madrid	Madrid
		Report		Stadium: Campo de O'Donnell

24 December 1920 Friendly	Sel. de Turin (Italy)	4–1	(Spain) Real Madrid	Turin, Italy
		Report		Stadium: Stadio di Corso Sebastopoli

26 December 1920 Friendly	Bologna F.C. (Italy)	3–0	(Spain) Real Madrid	Bologna, Italy
		Report		Stadium: Stadio Sterlino

1 January 1921 Friendly	US Livorno (Italy)	2–0	(Spain) Real Madrid	Livorno, Italy
		Report		Stadium: Villa Chayes Stadium

3 January 1921 Friendly	Nazionale Emilia (Italy)	1–4	(Spain) Real Madrid	Bologna, Italy
		Report		Stadium: Campo Cesoia

6 January 1921 Friendly	Genoa C.F.C. (Italy)	5–0	(Spain) Real Madrid	Genoa, Italy
		Report		Stadium: Stadio Luigi Ferraris

9 January 1921 Friendly	CE Sabadell FC	0–1	Real Madrid	Sabadell
		Report

11 January 1921 Friendly	FC Barcelona	3–0	Real Madrid	Barcelona
		Report		Stadium: Camp de la Indústria

11 March 1921 Friendly	Sporting de Gijón	7–0	Real Madrid	Gijón
		Report		Stadium: El Molinón

13 March 1921 Friendly	Sporting de Gijón	3–1	Real Madrid	Gijón
		Report		Stadium: El Molinón

19 March 1921 Friendly	Real Madrid (Spain)	3–1	(Portugal) FC Porto	Madrid, Spain
		Report		Stadium: Campo de O'Donnell

20 March 1921 Friendly	Real Madrid (Spain)	2–1	(Portugal) FC Porto	Madrid, Spain
		Report		Stadium: Campo de O'Donnell

24 March 1921 Friendly – 3rd reserve team	Real Madrid	2–2	B.E. Del Rio de La Plata	Madrid
		Report		Stadium: Campo de O'Donnell
Note: Real Madrid fielded their third team for this match. B.E. Del Rio de La Plata was a team from the Banking League, a league made up of teams fielded by Spanish banks.

3 April 1921 Friendly	Racing de Madrid	1–3	Real Madrid	Madrid
		Report		Stadium: Martínez Campos

17 April 1921 Friendly	Real Madrid	4–1	RS Gimnástica	Madrid
		Report		Stadium: Campo de O'Donnell

13 May 1921 Friendly	Real Madrid	2–1	Club Comercial Vigo	Madrid
		Report		Stadium: Campo de O'Donnell

15 May 1921 Friendly	Real Madrid	3–0	Club Comercial Vigo	Madrid
		Report		Stadium: Campo de O'Donnell

17 May 1921 Friendly	Maria Cristina FC	1–2	Real Madrid	El Escorial
		Report		Stadium: Universidad

22 May 1921 Friendly	Real Madrid	5–1	Combinado de Segunda	Madrid
		Report		Stadium: Campo de O'Donnell
Note: Combinado de Segunda was a selection of players from Stadium FC, Unión SC, and Patronato. These three teams played in the second division of the Campeonato Regional Centro.

26 May 1921 Friendly	Real Madrid	7–0	Selección Militar	Madrid
		Report		Stadium: Campo de O'Donnell
Note: Selección Militar was made up of football players from the 1st Military Region.

4 June 1921 Friendly	Boavista F.C. (Portugal)	2–7	(Spain) Real Madrid	Porto, Portugal
		Report		Stadium: Estádio do Bessa

5 June 1921 Friendly	FC Porto (Portugal)	0–5	(Spain) Real Madrid	Porto, Portugal
		Report		Stadium: Campo da Constituição

8 June 1921 Friendly	Real Madrid	3–2	Selección Militar	Madrid
		Report		Stadium: Campo de O'Donnell; Referee: Corona
Note: Selección Militar was made up of football players from the 1st Military Region. Some Real Madrid players played for Selección Militar in this match including Santiago Bernabéu, Posada and De Miguel.

== Competitions ==
=== Overview ===
Competition	First match	Last match	Starting round	Final position	Record							
Competition	First match	Last match	Starting round	Final position	Pld	W	D	L	GF	GA	GD	Win %
Campeonato Regional Centro	31 October 1920	20 February 1921	Matchday 1	3rd	6	2	1	3	14	9	+5	33.33
Total					6	2	1	3	14	9	+5	33.33

Source: Competitions

=== Campeonato Regional Centro ===
==== League table ====
Pos	Team	Pld	W	D	L	GF	GA	GD	Pts	Qualification
1	Athletic Madrid (C, Q)	6	5	1	0	13	3	+10	11	Qualification for the Copa del Rey.
2	Racing Madrid	6	3	1	2	11	7	+4	7	
3	Real Madrid	6	2	1	3	14	9	+5	5	
4	RS Gimnástica	6	0	1	5	3	22	−19	1	

Source: Rec.Sport.Soccer Statistics Foundation
Rules for classification: 1) points; 2) goal difference; 3) number of goals scored.
(C) Champions; (Q) Qualified for the phase indicated

==== Matches ====
31 October 1920 1	Racing de Madrid	2–2	Real Madrid	Madrid
	Ventura; Buylla	Report	Torrado; Rey II	Stadium: Racing; Referee: Sócrates Quintana

14 November 1920 2	RS Gimnástica	1–7	Real Madrid	Madrid
	Urbina	Report	Torrado; Víctor; González; Torrado; González	Stadium: Gimnástica; Referee: Ruete

28 November 1920 3	Athletic Madrid	2–0	Real Madrid	Madrid
	L. Olaso 15'; Sansinesea ?'	Report		Stadium: Metropolitano; Referee: Montero

16 January 1921 4	Real Madrid	1–2	Racing de Madrid	Madrid
	Sicilia	Report	Ventura; Azurza	Stadium: Campo de O'Donnell; Referee: Sócrates Quintana

30 January 1921 5	Real Madrid	3–0	RS Gimnástica	Madrid
	Bilbao; De Miguel	Report		Stadium: Campo de O'Donnell; Referee: Pastor

20 February 1921 6	Real Madrid	1–2	Athletic Madrid	Madrid
	Mengotti	Report	Triana	Stadium: Campo de O'Donnell; Referee: Pastor and Julián Ruete
