= 1924–25 Real Madrid CF season =

23rd season in existence of Real Madrid CF

Real Madrid
1924–25 season
- President: Pedro Parages
- Manager: Juan de Cárcer
- Stadium: Estadio Chamartín
- Campeonato Regional Centro (Note: The Campeonato Regional Centro (Central Regional Championship) was a regional league used as a qualifier for the Copa del Rey.): 2nd
- Top goalscorer: Santiago Bernabéu (5)
- Biggest win: Real Madrid 4–0 Unión SC
- Biggest defeat: Real Madrid 0–2 Racing de Madrid
Home colours	Away colours

The 1924–25 season was Real Madrid Club de Fútbol's 23rd season in existence. The club played some friendly matches. They also played in the Campeonato Regional Centro (Central Regional Championship).

== Friendlies ==
10 August 1924 Friendly	Real Madrid	1–2	RS Gimnástica	Madrid
		Report		Stadium: Estadio Chamartín

30 August 1924 Friendly	Real Madrid (Spain)	3–0	(Germany) SpVgg Greuther Fürth	Madrid, Spain
		Report		Stadium: Estadio Chamartín

13 September 1924 Friendly	Real Madrid (Spain)	0–4	(England) Civil Service F.C.	Madrid, Spain
		Report		Stadium: Estadio Chamartín

14 September 1924 Friendly	Real Madrid (Spain)	1–3	(England) Civil Service F.C.	Madrid, Spain
		Report		Stadium: Estadio Chamartín

20 September 1924 Friendly	Real Madrid (Spain)	2–2	(Czechoslovakia) SK Moravská Slavia Brno	Madrid, Spain
		Report		Stadium: Estadio Chamartín

21 September 1924 Friendly	Real Madrid (Spain)	0–1	(Czechoslovakia) SK Moravská Slavia Brno	Madrid, Spain
		Report		Stadium: Estadio Chamartín

28 September 1924 Friendly	Real Madrid (Spain)	2–2	(Italy) Torino Calcio	Madrid, Spain
		Report		Stadium: Estadio Chamartín

18 October 1924 Friendly	Ávila CF	0–2	Real Madrid	Ávila
		Report		Stadium: San Francisco

26 October 1924 Friendly	Deportivo Aranjuez	1–4	Real Madrid	Aranjuez
		Report

1 November 1924 Friendly	Real Madrid	2–1	Real Sociedad	Madrid
		Report		Stadium: Estadio Chamartín

13 December 1924 Friendly	UD San Lorenzo	2–5	Real Madrid	Aranjuez
		Report

25 December 1924 Friendly	Real Madrid	1–7	Real Unión	Madrid
		Report		Stadium: Estadio Chamartín

28 December 1924 Friendly	Real Madrid	2–2	Arenas Club de Getxo	Madrid
		Report		Stadium: Estadio Chamartín

31 December 1924 Friendly	Real Madrid (Spain)	1–6	(Switzerland) FC Zürich	Madrid, Spain
		Report		Stadium: Estadio Chamartín

1 January 1925 Friendly	Real Madrid (Spain)	3–7	(Switzerland) FC Zürich	Madrid, Spain
		Report		Stadium: Estadio Chamartín

4 January 1925 Friendly	Sevilla FC	6–0	Real Madrid	Seville
		Report		Stadium: Campo de la Reina Victoria

5 January 1925 Friendly	Sevilla FC	6–0	Real Madrid	Seville
		Report		Stadium: Campo de la Reina Victoria

22 March 1925 Friendly	Real Madrid (Spain)	0–1	(Argentina) Boca Juniors	Madrid, Spain
		Report		Stadium: Estadio Chamartín

15 May 1925 Friendly	Real Madrid	2–2	Celta de Vigo	Madrid
		Report		Stadium: Estadio Chamartín

21 May 1925 Friendly	Real Madrid (Spain)	2–3	(England) Birmingham City F.C.	Madrid, Spain
		Report		Stadium: Estadio Chamartín

6 June 1925 Friendly	Real Madrid	4–4	Sporting de Gijón	Madrid
		Report		Stadium: Estadio Chamartín

7 June 1925 Friendly	Real Madrid	2–0	Sporting de Gijón	Madrid
		Report		Stadium: Estadio Chamartín

== Competitions ==
=== Overview ===
Competition	First match	Last match	Starting round	Final position	Record							
Competition	First match	Last match	Starting round	Final position	Pld	W	D	L	GF	GA	GD	Win %
Campeonato Regional Centro	12 October 1924	1 March 1925	Matchday 1	2nd	8	3	3	2	11	6	+5	37.50
Total					8	3	3	2	11	6	+5	37.50

Source: Competitions

=== Campeonato Regional Centro ===
==== League table ====
Pos	Team	Pld	W	D	L	GF	GA	GD	Pts	Qualification
1	Athletic Madrid (C, Q)	8	5	3	0	21	7	+14	13	Qualification for the Copa del Rey.
2	Real Madrid	8	3	3	2	11	6	+5	9	
3	RS Gimnástica	8	4	0	4	21	16	+5	8	
4	Racing Madrid	8	3	1	4	21	19	+2	7	
5	Unión SC (O)	8	1	1	6	3	29	−26	3	Qualification for the relegation play-offs

Source: Rec.Sport.Soccer Statistics Foundation
Rules for classification: 1) points; 2) goal difference; 3) number of goals scored.
(C) Champions; (O) Play-off winners; (Q) Qualified for the phase indicated

==== Matches ====
12 October 1924 1	Athletic Madrid	1–1	Real Madrid	Madrid
	O. de la Torre 44'	Report	S. Bernabéu 16'	Stadium: Estadio Metropolitano; Referee: Ángel Torre

16 November 1924 2	Unión SC	1–0	Real Madrid	Madrid
	Zuguzaga 14'	Report		Stadium: Gimnástica; Referee: Navaz

23 November 1924 3	RS Gimnástica	0–3	Real Madrid	Madrid
		Report	Quesada 80'; Félix Pérez; Santiago Bernabéu	Stadium: Estadio Metropolitano; Referee: Steiborn

6 December 1924 4	Racing de Madrid	1–1	Real Madrid	Madrid
	Colomer 25'	Report	Ubeda 20'	Stadium: Racing; Referee: P. Serrano

1 February 1925 5	Real Madrid	4–0	Unión SC	Madrid
	Santiago Bernabéu; Ubeda; Félix Pérez; Quesada	Report		Stadium: Estadio Chamartín; Referee: Nanaz

8 February 1925 6	Real Madrid	1–0	RS Gimnástica	Madrid
	S. Bernabéu 60'	Report		Stadium: Estadio Chamartín; Referee: Ezcurdia

15 February 1925 7	Real Madrid	0–2	Racing de Madrid	Madrid
		Report	Valderrama 5'; R. Álvarez	Stadium: Estadio Chamartín; Referee: Adrados

1 March 1925 8	Real Madrid	1–1	Athletic Madrid	Madrid
	S. Bernabéu 70'	Report	Escobal 39' (o.g.)	Stadium: Estadio Chamartín; Referee: Fermín Sánchez
