= 1906–07 Madrid FC season =

5th season in existence of Real Madrid CF

Madrid FC
1906–07 season
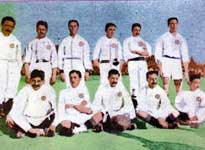
- Madrid FC team in 1907.
- President: Carlos Padrós
- Manager: No manager
- Stadium: No home stadium
- Copa del Rey: Winners
- Madrid Regional Championship: Winners
- Top goalscorer: League: — All: (3); Armando Giralt; Antonio Neyra
- Biggest win: Madrid FC 7–0 Excelsior FC
- Biggest defeat: Club Bizcaya 3–2 Madrid FC
| Home colours | Away colours |

The 1906–07 season was Madrid Football Club's 5th season in existence. The club played some friendly matches. They also played in the Campeonato Regional de Madrid (Madrid Regional Championship) and the Copa del Rey. Madrid FC won both competitions for the third consecutive season, becoming the first club to achieve the feat. However, the results of the Campeonato de Madrid were later annulled by the Madrid Football Federation.

== Players ==
Note: Flags indicate national team as defined under FIFA eligibility rules; some limited exceptions apply. Players may hold more than one non-FIFA nationality.

| No. | Pos. | Nation | Player |
|---|---|---|---|
| — | GK | ESP | Manuel Alcalde Bahamonde |
| — | DF | ESP | José Berraondo |
| — | DF | ESP | José Quirante |
| — | DF | ESP | Plácido Álvarez-Buylla |
| — | MF | ESP | Enrique Normand |
| — | MF | CUB | José Giralt |
| — | MF | ESP | Manuel Prast |

| No. | Pos. | Nation | Player |
|---|---|---|---|
| — | MF | ESP | Manuel Mauricio Yarza |
| — | FW | FRA | Pedro Parages |
| — | FW | GUA | Federico Revuelto |
| — | FW | ESP | Antonio Neyra |
| — | FW | CUB | Armando Giralt |
| — | FW | CUB | Mario Giralt |
| — | FW | ESP | Joaquín Yarza Simmonds |

== Friendlies ==
| 4 August 1906 Friendly | Madrid FC | 0–0 | Sporting Club | Ciudad Lineal, Madrid |
| | | Report |
Note: This was the first match played by Madrid-based Club Sporting Internacional.

| 14 October 1906 Friendly | Madrid FC | 5–1 | CS Internacional | Hipódromo, Madrid |
| | ? ? ? ? ? | Report | G. Garrido |
Note: CS Internacional played the match with 8 players.

| 18 November 1906 Friendly | Moncloa FC | 0–5 | Madrid FC | Moncloa, Madrid |
| https://web.archive.org/web/20190921091522/http://www.leyendablanca.galeon.com:80/tempo07.htm | | | Chulilla; Zamora; Chulilla; Revuelto | Referee: Trelles |

| 5 January 1907 Friendly | Madrid FC (Spain) | 0–2 | (Portugal) Internacional Lisboa | Madrid, Spain |
| | | Report | Pinto Basto; Kendall | Stadium: Avenida de Toros; Referee: José Berraondo |

| 13 January 1907 Friendly | Madrid FC | 2–1 | Iris FC | Av. Plaza de Toros, Madrid |
| | | Report |
Note: Iris FC played the match with 10 players.

| 3 March 1907 Friendly | Madrid FC (Spain) | 2–1 | (England) English Sport Club | Madrid, Spain |
| | | Report |

| 25 April 1907 Friendly | RS Nobles Ingleses Valladolid (England) | 6–2 | Madrid FC | Era de los Ingleses, Valladolid |
| | | Report |

| 2 December 1906 Friendly – 2nd reserve team | Madrid FC | 2–0 | Athletic Club Sucursal de Madrid | Hipódromo, Madrid |
| | Solano; Normand | Report | | Referee: Gondra |
Note: The match was played by the second teams of both clubs.

| 2 December 1906 Friendly – 3rd reserve team | Madrid FC | 0–5 | Athletic Club Sucursal de Madrid | Hipódromo, Madrid |
| | | Report |
Note: The match was played by the third teams of both clubs.

== Competitions ==
=== Overview ===
| Competition | First match | Last match | Starting round | Final position | Record | | | | | | | |
| Competition | First match | Last match | Starting round | Final position | Pld | W | D | L | GF | GA | GD | Win % |
|---|---|---|---|---|---|---|---|---|---|---|---|---|
| Campeonato Regional de Madrid | 2 December 1906 | 2 December 1906 | Final | Winners | 1 | 1 | 0 | 0 | 2 | 1 | +1 | 100.00 |
| Copa del Rey | 24 February 1907 | 30 March 1907 | Qualifying round | Winners | 7 | 6 | 0 | 1 | 26 | 7 | +19 | 85.71 |
| Total | | | | | 8 | 7 | 0 | 1 | 28 | 8 | +20 | 87.50 |

Source: Competitions

=== Campeonato Regional de Madrid ===
| 2 December 1906 Final | Madrid FC | 2–1 | Athletic Club Sucursal de Madrid | Av. Plaza Toros, Madrid |
| | Zamora; Yarza | Report | ? | Referee: Merino |

=== Copa del Rey ===
==== Madrid qualifying tournament ====
| 24 February 1907 Copa del Rey qualifier | Madrid FC | 5–0 | Excelsior FC | Av. Plaza de Toros, Madrid |
| | | Report | | Referee: Meléndez |

| 10 March 1907 Copa del Rey qualifier | Madrid FC | 4–1 | Hispania FC | Av. Plaza de Toros, Madrid |
| | J. Giralt; Prast 35', 40' ? | Report; Report | Trelles | Referee: Valls |
Note: Excelsior FC changed its name to Hispania FC, and returned play against Madrid FC.

==== Group stage ====
| Pos | Team | Pld | W | D | L | GF | GA | GD | Pts |
|---|---|---|---|---|---|---|---|---|---|
| 1 | Club Bizcaya | 4 | 3 | 0 | 1 | 4 | 9 | +5 | 6 |
| 2 | Madrid FC | 4 | 3 | 0 | 1 | 14 | 6 | +8 | 6 |
| 3 | Vigo FC | 4 | 2 | 1 | 1 | 8 | 8 | 0 | 5 |
| 4 | Hamilton FC | 4 | 1 | 0 | 3 | 3 | 12 | -9 | 2 |
| 5 | Huelva Recreation Club | 4 | 0 | 1 | 3 | 5 | 13 | -8 | 1 |

| 24 March 1907 1 | Madrid FC | 2–3 | Club Bizcaya | Hipódromo, Madrid |
| | Revuelto; Prast 75' | Report | Simmons; Goyoaga; Simmons | Referee: Sidney |

| 25 March 1907 2 | Madrid FC | 3–1 | Vigo FC | Hipódromo, Madrid |
| | J. Giralt; Ocaña (?); A. Giralt | Report | Hambly |

| 28 March 1907 3 | Madrid FC | 5–0 | Hamilton FC | Hipódromo, Madrid |
| | A. Giralt; Neyra; A. Giralt; Neyra | Report |

| 29 March 1907 4 | Madrid FC | 4–2 | Huelva Recreation Club | Hipódromo, Madrid |
| | | Report |

==== Final ====
Although intended to be a round-robin tournament, at the end of the group stage, Madrid FC and Club Vizcaya finished tied at 6 points. A tiebreaker final was contested on 30 March to determine the winner of the 1907 Copa del Rey.

| 30 March 1907 Final | Madrid FC | 1–0 | Club Bizcaya | Hipódromo, Madrid |
| | Prast 80' | | | Attendance: 6,000; Referee: (England) Sindney |
