= 1905–06 Madrid FC season =

4th season in existence of Real Madrid CF

Madrid FC
1905–06 season
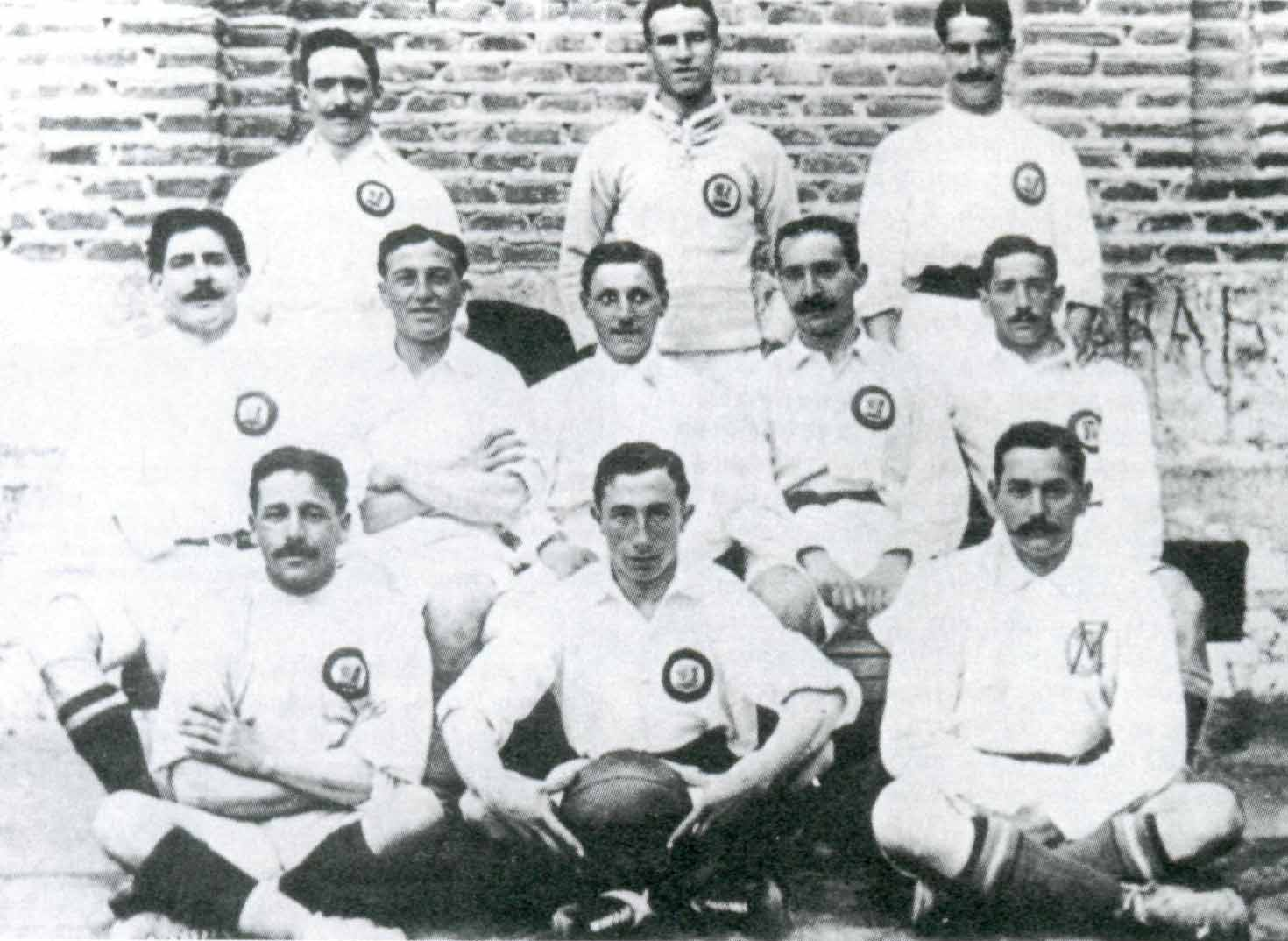
- Madrid FC team in 1906.
- President: Carlos Padrós
- Manager: No manager
- Stadium: No home stadium
- Copa del Rey: Winners
- Madrid Championship (Note: The Campeonato de Madrid (Madrid Championship) was a regional qualifier for the Copa del Rey.): Winners
- Top goalscorer: League: — All: Pedro Parages (3)
- Biggest win: Madrid FC 7–0 FC Internacional
- Biggest defeat: Unbeaten in competitive matches
Home colours	Away colours

The 1905–06 season was Madrid Football Club's 4th season in existence. The club played three friendly matches including their first international match against French club Gallia FC. They also played in the Campeonato de Madrid (Madrid Championship) and the Copa del Rey. Madrid FC won both competitions becoming the first club to successfully defend both titles.

== Summary ==
- 23 October: Madrid organised a friendly game against French side Gallia FC to commemorate the visit of French President Émile Loubet to Madrid. The match ended with a 1–1 draw. It was the first international match to take place in Madrid.

== Players ==
Note: Flags indicate national team as defined under FIFA eligibility rules; some limited exceptions apply. Players may hold more than one non-FIFA nationality.

No.	Pos.	Nation	Player
—	GK	ESP	Manuel Alcalde Bahamonde
—	DF	ESP	José Berraondo
—	MF	ESP	Enrique Normand
—	MF	CUB	José Giralt
—	MF	ESP	Manuel Prast
—	MF	ESP	Manuel Mauricio Yarza

No.	Pos.	Nation	Player
—	FW	FRA	Pedro Parages
—	FW	GUA	Federico Revuelto
—	FW	ESP	Antonio Neyra
—	FW	CUB	Armando Giralt
—	FW	CUB	Mario Giralt
—	FW	ESP	Joaquín Yarza Ormazábal
—	FW	ESP	Antonio Alonso Giménez-Cuenca

== Friendlies ==
26 October 1905 Friendly	Madrid FC (Spain)	1–1	(France) Gallia FC	Madrid, Spain
	Prast	Report	Jouvé	Stadium: Hipódromo; Referee: (Germany) Steinberg

13 May 1906 Friendly	Madrid FC	7–0	FC Internacional	Narváez, Madrid
		Report

13 May 1906 Friendly	FC Barcelona	5–2	Madrid FC	Barcelona
	Walplace, Ponz, Forns	Report	Meléndez; Revuelto	Referee: Degollada
Note: The FC Barcelona team for this match included players from Catalá, X and Español.

== Competitions ==
=== Overview ===
Competition	First match	Last match	Starting round	Final position	Record							
Competition	First match	Last match	Starting round	Final position	Pld	W	D	L	GF	GA	GD	Win %
Campeonato de Madrid	25 March 1906	25 March 1906	Final	Winners	1	1	0	0	7	0	+7	100.00
Copa del Rey	9 April 1906	10 April 1906	First round	Winners	2	2	0	0	7	1	+6	100.00
Total					3	3	0	0	14	1	+13	100.00

Source: Competitions

=== Campeonato de Madrid ===
25 March 1906 Final	Madrid FC	7–0	Internacional FC	Hipódromo, Madrid
	J. Giralt 5'; Revuelto ? ? ? ? ?	Report		Referee: Álvarez

=== Copa del Rey ===
9 April 1906 Round 1	Madrid FC	3–0	Huelva Recreation Club	Hipódromo, Madrid
	J. Giralt (?); Revuelto (?); Parages (?)	Report		Referee: (Spain) Prado

10 April 1906 Final	Madrid FC	4–1	Athletic Bilbao	Hipódromo, Madrid
	Prast (?); Parages (?)	Report	Uribe (?)	Referee: (England) Watterson
