= Antonio Cedrés =

Spanish footballer and coach

Personal information
- Full name: Antonio Cedrés Cabrera
- Date of birth: 28 October 1927
- Place of birth: Las Palmas, Spain
- Date of death: 14 October 2015 (aged 87)

Senior career*
Years	Team	Apps	(Gls)
- Real Club Victoria
- Telde
- Las Palmas
- Real Betis

Managerial career
- El Carmen
- Isleta
- Rosiana
- * Club domestic league appearances and goals

Antonio Cedrés Cabrera (28 October 1927 – 14 October 2015) was a Spanish professional football player and coach.

== Playing career ==
He played for Real Club Victoria, Telde, Las Palmas and Real Betis, before retiring at the age of 24 due to injury.

== Coaching career ==
He later managed El Carmen, Isleta and Rosiana.

== Personal life ==
His brothers Juan, Domingo and Feluco were also footballers.
