= Ramón Encinas =

Spanish football manager (1893–1967)

Personal information
- Full name: Ramón Encinas Dios
- Date of birth: 19 May 1893
- Place of birth: Pontevedra, Spain
- Date of death: 21 March 1967 (aged 73)
- Place of death: Madrid, Spain

Youth career
- Sporting de Pontevedra

Senior career*
Years	Team	Apps	(Gls)
- Rácing de Vigo

Managerial career
- 1928–1931: Celta Vigo
- 1931–1932: Alavés
- 1933–1936: Sevilla
- 1939–1942: Valencia
- 1943–1945: Real Madrid
- 1945–1947: Sevilla
- 1948–1949: Sevilla
- 1959: Sevilla
- * Club domestic league appearances and goals

Ramón Encinas (19 May 1893 in Pontevedra – 21 March 1967 in Madrid) was a Spanish football player and manager. As manager, he coached Celta Vigo, Alavés, Sevilla, Valencia and Real Madrid. He led Valencia and Sevilla to their first league titles.
