= Cedre =

French car manufacturer

Société Seve-Cedre (1975–1979) Cedre SARL (1979–1987)
- Founded: 1975
- Defunct: 1987
- Headquarters: Montesquieu-Volvestre, France
- Key people: François Guerbet
- Products: Very small electric Automobiles

Cedre SARL (until 1979 registered as Société Seve-Cedre) was a French manufacturer of small cars, powered by electricity and fueled using batteries. The business was established in 1975, a year after the presentation, by François Guerbet, of his first prototype at a small town called Montesquieu-Volvestre, some fifty four kilometers south of Toulouse.

Cedre was an acronym standing for Centre d'Études pour la Développement et la Réussite des Entreprises. The Cedre entity formed in 1975 was not a conventional commercial business but a "not-for-profit" ecologically focused entity, its non-commercial status being defined under the terms of a statute which dated from 1901.

Production ended in 1987.

== Origins ==
By 1974 François Guerbet had been fighting for several years to prove that an urban electric car was more than an impossible dream. He believed that using lead-acid battery technology (then the only available option given the amount of charge needed to propel a vehicle) it would be impossible both to match the performance of a "normal" petrol driven car and achieve a reasonable range between recharging stops. But by restricting the top speed to 50 km/h (31 mph) and using a very light bodied tricycle format vehicle carrying 200 kg of batteries, it should be possible to travel 100 km (61 miles) with a 120 kg load (e.g. a 70 kg person with 50 kg of luggage). In essence, that combination was the blue print for the Midinette which Guerbet first presented on 25 April 1975 at the annual Paris Inventions Fair.

== Funding issues ==
Unfortunately Guerbet did not have the funds available in 1975 to put his electric car into production. He was well provided with persistence, however, and pursued various publicity opportunities, presenting at events such as the International Symposium of Electric Cars at Düsseldorf in September 1976 and, subsequently, at a similar event organised by the city of Brussels. Nor was he shy of promoting the Cedre in his own capital, and pictures exist of the Midinette driving along the Champs-Élysées overshadowed, in one of them, by a Fiat 500 and a Mini both of which look quite large when driving beside the little electric single seater. However, in 1977 there was still not the funding to put the Midinette into production.

Guerbet's persistence finally paid off and during September 1978 the first customers for the production version of the Midinette were taking delivery of the vehicle which by now was priced by the manufacturer 14,110 francs. The next year the little electric vehicle was again a star attraction at the Concours Lépine (annual Paris Inventions Fair) during the first fortnight in May 1978.

== The cars ==
Guerbet's first car, the electric prototype of 1974, was identified as the Mini 1, and also as the Soubrette

The Midinette followed in 1975, and by 1979 had been put into production. It was powered by a 1.2 kW electric motor. Top speed was given as 50 km/h (31 mph), and the range as 60 km (37 miles). The car offered space for one and the plastic/polyester body was accessed through a sliding door on the car's left side. The Midinette was 1,800 mm (70.9 in) long and 880 mm (34.6 in) wide. The body was fitted on a small tubular chassis and there were three wheels, the single wheel being the one at the front. Despite its rather basic nature, the price quoted for the car was 9,540 francs. (At the 61st Paris Motor Show the previous October the entry level Citroën 2CV was priced by its manufacturer at 9,980 francs. The Citroën was also a rather basic proposition, but it could seat four in reasonable comfort at a speed (just) above 100 km/h (63 mph).)

In 1981 the Midinette was replaced by the Cedre 1000. Top speed was quoted as "around 40 km/h" (25 mph) but the quoted range between charges was now increased to 120 km (75 miles). A recharging device now enabled the cars to be recharged overnight using a standard domestic power socket, and suitable public recharging points were also beginning to appear at car parks in one or two French cities (though, like the electric cars themselves, the public charging points were at this stage still very rare). The Cedre itself had now grown to a length of 2,000 mm (78.7 in), though it was still really only a one seater. The quoted price was now 23,500 francs, so that, as before, a one-seater electric Cedre was advertised for very slightly less than the price of a basic entry level Citroën 2CV, now priced by Citroën at 23,850 francs. Cedre customers could now specify, as an option extra, solar panels on the roof of the Cedre which increased "driver autonomy", on a sunny day adding around 20 km (12 miles) to the distance that could be covered between charges.

There was also a model for which maximum output was given as 5 kW.

A special model was presented called the 5x5 Solaire.

== Bibliography ==
- Harald Linz, Halwart Schrader: Die Internationale Automobil-Enzyklopädie. United Soft Media Verlag, München 2008, ISBN 978-3-8032-9876-8. (German)
- George Nick Georgano (Chefredakteur): The Beaulieu Encyclopedia of the Automobile. Volume 3: P–Z. Fitzroy Dearborn Publishers, Chicago 2001, ISBN 1-57958-293-1. (English)
- George Nick Georgano: Autos. Encyclopédie complète. 1885 à nos jours. Courtille, Paris 1975. (French)
