= José Luis Espinosa (footballer) =

Spanish footballer

Personal information
- Full name: José Luis Espinosa Pachón
- Date of birth: 14 June 1913
- Place of birth: La Carolina, Andalusia, Spain
- Date of death: 23 December 1975 (aged 62)
- Place of death: Spain
- Position: Goalkeeper

Youth career
- 1927–1931: Real Betis Cantera

Senior career*
Years	Team	Apps	(Gls)
1931–1935	Real Betis	1	(0)
1935–1936	Real Madrid		
1939–1941	Real Madrid	16	(0)
1941–1943	Real Valladolid		
- Real Ávila
- Gimnástica Segoviana
Total		17	(0)

Managerial career
- 1952–1953: Real Madrid Cantera
- * Club domestic league appearances and goals

José Luis Espinosa Pachón (14 June 1913 – 23 December 1975) was a Spanish footballer who played as a goalkeeper for Real Betis and Real Madrid in the 1930s.

== Playing career ==
=== Real Betis ===
Born on 14 June 1913 in the Province of Jaén town of La Carolina, Andalusia, Espinosa began his football career in Real Betis Cantera, the youth team of his hometown club Real Betis, remaining there for four years, from 1927 until 1931, when he finally broke through to the first team, making his debut on 18 October 1931, aged 18, in a friendly match against Sevilla, keeping a clean-sheet in a 3–0 win. However, his playing time was severely limited due to the presence of Joaquín Urquiaga, who was the club's starting goalkeeper throughout the early 1930s, thus having few opportunities with the first team. In the 1932–33 season, Espinosa was one of the first players of Betis' newly-formed amateur reserve team coached by Andrés Aranda, who was still a first-team player.

Espinosa was only able to make his league debut four years later, on 7 April 1935, keeping a clean-sheet in a 5–0 win over Espanyol. By playing in this match, Espinosa officially became a part of the squad that won the 1934–35 La Liga title, the first (and only) league title in club's history. In total, he played five official matches for Betis, one in the league and four in the Andalusian championship.

=== Real Madrid ===
Perhaps unsatisfied with his lack of playing time, Espinosa joined Real Madrid in the following season, but he was unable to play a single official match for the club between the summer of 1935 and the outbreak of the Spanish Civil War, after which he returned to Madrid, and thanks to the shortage of players during the post-Civil War period, Espinosa was finally able to play more frequently, starting in 15 official matches for them in the 1939–40 season. In his second season, however, he only played five for a total of 20. In total, he played 17 La Liga matches for Betis and Madrid.

After leaving Madrid in 1941, Espisona played for Real Valladolid, then in the Segunda División, followed by Real Ávila, and Gimnástica Segoviana.

== Managerial career ==
At the start of the 1953–54 season, Espisona was appointed as the new coach of Real Madrid Cantera, where he shared his vast experience in goal with the youth, which was especially valuable to the defensive players. He had a pragmatic approach, which was based on discipline, hard work, and the importance of technical details, but he was soon replaced by José Morales Berriguete. In the early 1960s, he was serving as the representative of Madrid's youth team.

== Death ==
Espisona died on 23 December 1975, at the age of 62.

== Honours ==
Real Betis

- La Liga
  - Champions (1): 1934–35
