= Cosme (footballer) =

Spanish footballer (1927–2011)

Personal information
- Full name: José Sirvent Bas
- Date of birth: August 31, 1927
- Place of birth: San Vicente del Raspeig, Spain
- Date of death: April 15, 2011 (aged 83)
- Place of death: Alicante, Spain
- Position: Goalkeeper

Youth career
- Gimnástica
- Atlético Alicante
- Marina
- Celta Bon Repòs

Senior career*
Years	Team	Apps	(Gls)
1943–1944	Alicante		
1944–1945	Elche		
1945–1946	Yeclano		
1946–1952	Hércules		
1952–1955	Real Madrid	8	(0)
1955–1958	Cultural Leonesa		
- * Club domestic league appearances and goals

José Sirvent Bas (31 August 1927 – 15 April 2011) was a Spanish football goalkeeper.

== Club career ==
He began playing in several teams in the city of Alicante, mainly in the San Pedro Cup amateur tournament. After playing in the Alicante CF, Elche CF and Yeclano CF, joined Hércules CF. In the Hércules played 6 seasons in the Second Division. In the 1947-48 season Cosme was famous for being the goalkeeper who conceded 9 goals in a match against CD Málaga, all materialized by Pedro Bazán.

Then he transferred to Real Madrid, but only played 8 games in the first season. By refusing to be transferred, Madrid relegated him off the team two seasons. After being played for the Cultural Leonesa in La Liga, having a great season. He continued playing in Cultural several seasons after the descent.

== Honours ==
Elche

- Tercera División: 1944–45

Real Madrid

- La Liga: 1953–54, 1954–55
- Latin Cup: 1954–55
