= Antonio Santos Peralba =

Spanish football administrator

10th President of Real Madrid
- In office 27 November 1940 – 11 September 1943
- Preceded by: Adolfo Meléndez
- Succeeded by: Santiago Bernabéu

Personal details
- Born: 1 November 1885; Gondomar, Kingdom of Spain
- Occupation: Football administrator

Antonio Santos Peralba (born 1 November 1885 – ??) was a Spanish football administrator who was the 10th President of Real Madrid from 27 November 1940 until 11 September 1943.
