= Juan Cedrés =

Spanish footballer

Personal information
- Full name: Juan Cedrés Cabrera
- Date of birth: 15 August 1927
- Place of birth: Las Palmas, Spain
- Date of death: 3 April 1979 (aged 51)
- Position: Forward

Senior career*
Years	Team	Apps	(Gls)
1951–1952	Las Palmas	21	(7)
1952–1953	Real Madrid	1	(0)
1953–1954	Lleida	25	(12)
1954–1955	Badajoz	30	(9)
1955–1956	Eldense	29	(3)
1956–1958	Badajoz	55	(7)
Total		161	(38)
- * Club domestic league appearances and goals

Juan Cedrés Cabrera (15 August 1927 – 3 April 1979) was a Spanish professional footballer who played as a forward.

== Playing career ==
Born in Las Palmas, he played for Las Palmas, Real Madrid, Lleida, Badajoz and Eldense.

== Personal life ==
His brothers Antonio, Domingo and Feluco were also footballers.
