= Gabriel Alonso =

Spanish footballer

Personal information
- Full name: Gabriel Alonso Aristiaguirre
- Date of birth: 9 November 1923
- Place of birth: Hondarribia, Spain
- Date of death: 19 November 1996 (aged 73)
- Place of death: Hondarribia, Spain
- Height: 1.72 m (5 ft 8 in)
- Position: Defender

Youth career
- Izarzuri

Senior career*
Years	Team	Apps	(Gls)
1939–1942	Real Unión		
1942–1946	Racing Ferrol	50	(0)
1946–1951	Celta	113	(0)
1951–1954	Real Madrid	45	(0)
1954–1956	Málaga	49	(0)
1956–1957	Rayo Vallecano	12	(0)

International career
1949	Spain B	1	(0)
1948–1952	Spain	12	(0)

Managerial career
- 1963–1964: Jaén
- * Club domestic league appearances and goals

Gabriel Alonso Aristiaguirre (9 November 1923 – 19 November 1996) was a Spanish footballer who played as a defender.

== Club career ==
Born in Hondarribia, Basque Country, Alonso played for three clubs in La Liga, Celta de Vigo, Real Madrid and CD Málaga, over the course of nine seasons. He won the 1954 national championship with the second team, but his input consisted of one game, a 1–1 away draw against CA Osasuna.

During an 18-year senior career, Alonso also represented Real Unión, Racing de Ferrol and Rayo Vallecano, retiring in June 1957 at the age of nearly 34 and dying at 73 in his hometown.

== International career ==
Alonso won 12 caps for Spain, during four years. He was selected for the squad that competed in the 1950 FIFA World Cup in Brazil, appearing in all six matches for the eventual fourth-placed nation.
