= Adolfo Meléndez =

Spanish military scientist and Real Madrid founder

4th and 9th president of Real Madrid
- In office 4 August 1936 – 27 November 1940
- Preceded by: Rafael Sánchez Guerra
- Succeeded by: Antonio Santos Peralba
- In office 1908 – July 1916
- Preceded by: Carlos Padrós
- Succeeded by: Pedro Parages

Personal details
- Born: 2 June 1884 A Coruña, Kingdom of Spain
- Died: 4 June 1968 (aged 84) Madrid, Spanish State
- Profession: Military scientist

Adolfo Meléndez (2 June 1884 – 4 June 1968) was a Spanish military scientist who founded Real Madrid and then went on to become its president.

He served two terms as Real Madrid president. His first spell was between 1908 and July 1916, and his second spell was between 4 August 1936 and 27 November 1940.
