= Manuel Alday =

Spanish footballer

Personal information
- Full name: Manuel Alday Marticorena
- Date of birth: 5 September 1917
- Place of birth: San Sebastian, Spain
- Date of death: 28 December 1976 (aged 59)
- Position: Striker

Senior career*
Years	Team	Apps	(Gls)
1939–1944	Real Madrid	79	(66)
- * Club domestic league appearances and goals

Manuel Alday Marticorena (5 September 1917 – 28 December 1976), was a Spanish footballer who played for Real Madrid.
