= 1946–47 Real Madrid CF season =

44th season in existence of Real Madrid CF

Real Madrid Club de Futbol
1946–47 season
- President: Santiago Bernabéu
- Manager: Baltasar Albeniz
- Stadium: Metropolitano
- La Liga: 7th
- Copa del Generalísimo: Winners
- Top goalscorer: Pruden (22)
Home colours	Away colours

The 1946–47 season was Real Madrid Club de Fútbol's 44th season in existence and the club's 15th consecutive season in the top flight of Spanish football.

== Summary ==
During summer Bernabeu appointed Baltasar Albeniz from Español as new head coach for the upcoming season. The squad was reinforced with Arsuaga, Ferrús, Rodriguez Gallardo, Sureda and future club legend Luis Molowny whom transfer rights President Bernabeu bought 'in extremis' sending his club manager Jacinto Quincoces by airplane to Las Palmas just before the arrival of FC Barcelona manager Ricardo Cabot by boat travel.

In the league, the squad reached the first spot several rounds aimed by Pruden goals, however, the team collapsed by the second part of the season finishing on 7th place.

The club clinched back-to-back cup champions winning its ninth 1947 Copa del Generalísimo Final against Español.

== Squad ==
Note: Flags indicate national team as defined under FIFA eligibility rules; some limited exceptions apply. Players may hold more than one non-FIFA nationality.

No.	Pos.	Nation	Player
—	GK	(Spain) ESP	José Bañón
—	DF	(Spain) ESP	Guillermo Pont
—	DF	(Spain) ESP	Pepe Corona
—	DF	(Spain) ESP	José María Querejeta
—	MF	(Spain) ESP	Ipiña
—	MF	(Spain) ESP	Félix Huete
—	MF	(Spain) ESP	Antonio Alsúa
—	MF	(Spain) ESP	Belmar
—	FW	(Spain) ESP	Pruden
—	FW	(Spain) ESP	Sabino Barinaga
—	FW	(Spain) ESP	Pablo Vidal

No.	Pos.	Nation	Player
—	GK	(Spain) ESP	Marín
—	MF	(Spain) ESP	Luis Molowny
—	DF	(Spain) ESP	Clemente Fernández
—	MF	(Spain) ESP	Rafa
—	FW	(Spain) ESP	Arsuaga
—	GK	(Spain) ESP	Ferrus
—	MF	(Spain) ESP	Teran
—	MF	(Spain) ESP	Gallardo
—	FW	(Spain) ESP	Hermenegildo Elices Rivas
—	MF	(Spain) ESP	Moleiro
—	FW	(Cuba) CUB	Chus Alonso
—	GK	(Spain) ESP	Sureda

=== Transfers ===
In
Pos.	Name	from	Type
MF	Luis Molowny	Marino	
FW	Pedro María Arsuaga Eguizabal		
GK	Fernando Ferrús Ezquerra	Español	
MF	Juan Rodriguez Gallardo		
GK	Francisco Sureda Fullana	Mallorca	

Out
Pos.	Name	To	Type
MF	José Luis Borbolla Chavira	Celta	
DF	Elzo	Deportivo La Coruña	
MF	Juanele	Nastic	
MF	Canal	FC Barcelona	
FW	Porro		
MF	Aracil	Santander	
GK	Palacios		

== Competitions ==
=== La Liga ===
==== Position by round ====
Round	1	2	3	4	5	6	7	8	9	10	11	12	13	14	15	16	17	18	19	20	21	22	23	24	25	26
Ground	A	H	A	H	A	H	H	A	H	A	H	A	H	H	A	H	A	H	A	A	H	A	H	A	H	A
Result	D	W	L	W	W	W	W	D	D	L	W	L	L	W	D	L	L	W	D	L	L	W	W	L	L	W
Position	11	2	6	3	1	1	1	1	1	2	1	2	4	3	4	5	6	6	6	7	8	7	7	7	9	7

Source: www.lfp.es
A = Away; H = Home; W = Win; D = Draw; L = Loss

==== League table ====
Pos	Team	Pld	W	D	L	GF	GA	GD	Pts
5	Sabadell	26	11	8	7	42	36	+6	30
6	Sevilla	26	12	5	9	54	48	+6	29
7	Real Madrid	26	11	5	10	62	56	+6	27 (Note: Real Madrid finished ahead of Oviedo on head-to-head points: Real Madrid–Oviedo 2–0, Oviedo–Real Madrid 0–0.)
8	Oviedo	26	10	7	9	52	42	+10	27
9	Celta	26	11	4	11	53	48	+5	26

Source: BDFútbol
Rules for classification: 1) points; 2) head-to-head points; 3) head-to-head goal difference; 4) goal difference; 5) number of goals scored.

==== Matches ====
22 September 1946 1	Real Oviedo	0–0	Real Madrid	Oviedo
		Report

2 9 September 1946 2	Real Madrid	5–0	Real Murcia	Madrid
		Report		Stadium: Metropolitano

6 October 1946 3	Atletico de Bilbao	2–0	Real Madrid	Bilbao
		Report

13 October 1946 4	Real Madrid	2–0	Español	Madrid
		Report		Stadium: Metropolitano

20 October 1946 5	CD Castellón	2–3	Real Madrid	Castellón de la Plana
	Soria 14'; Asensio 56'	Report	Pruden 20'; Pruden 68'; Barinaga 80'	Stadium: Castalia; Referee: Azón Roma

27 October 1946 6	Real Madrid	5–0	Deportivo La Coruña	Madrid
		Report		Stadium: Metropolitano

3 November 1946 7	Real Madrid	4–0	Real Gijón	Madrid
		Report		Stadium: Metropolitano

10 November 1946 8	Sabadell	3–3	Real Madrid	Sabadell
		Report

17 November 1946 9	Real Madrid	3–3	Celta de Vigo	Madrid
		Report		Stadium: Metropolitano

24 November 1946 10	Sevilla CF	5–0	Real Madrid	Sevilla
		Report

1 December 1946 11	Real Madrid	2–1	FC Barcelona	Madrid
		Report		Stadium: Metropolitano

8 December 1946 12	Valencia CF	4–1	Real Madrid	Valencia
		Report

15 December 1946 13	Real Madrid	1–2	Atlético de Madrid	Madrid
		Report		Stadium: Metropolitano

29 December 1946 14	Real Madrid	2–0	Real Oviedo	Madrid
		Report		Stadium: Metropolitano

6 January 1947 15	Real Murcia	1–1	Real Madrid	Murcia
		Report

12 January 1947 16	Real Madrid	3–6	Atletico de Bilbao	Madrid
		Report		Stadium: Metropolitano

19 January 1947 17	Español	4–2	Real Madrid	Barcelona
		Report

2 February 1947 18	Real Madrid	7–4	CD Castellón	Madrid
		Report		Stadium: Metropolitano

9 February 1947 19	Deportivo La Coruña	2–2	Real Madrid	La Coruña
	Molaza 36'; Latorre 47'	Report	Pruden 5'; Pruden 29'	Stadium: Nuevo Riazor; Referee: Obiol

16 February 1947 20	Real Gijón	2–1	Real Madrid	Gijón
		Report

9 March 1947 21	Real Madrid	1–3	Sabadell	Madrid
		Report		Stadium: Metropolitano

16 March 1947 22	Celta Vigo	3–4	Real Madrid	Vigo
		Report

23 March 1947 23	Real Madrid	3–0	Sevilla CF	Madrid
		Report		Stadium: Metropolitano

30 March 1947 24	FC Barcelona	3–2	Real Madrid	Barcelona
		Report

6 April 1947 25	Real Madrid	2–4	Valencia CF	Madrid
		Report		Stadium: Metropolitano

13 March 1947 26	Atlético Madrid	2–3	Real Madrid	Madrid
		Report		Stadium: Metropolitano

=== Copa del Generalísimo ===
22 June 1947	Real Madrid CF	2–0	RCD Español	Estadio Riazor, La Coruña
18:00 CET	Vidal 107'; Pruden 119'	Report (in Spanish)		Attendance: 30,000; Referee: Francisco Echave

== Statistics ==
=== Squad statistics ===
competition	points	total						GD
competition	points	G	V	N	P	Gf	Gs	GD
1946–47 La Liga	34	21	7	7	12	67	42	+25
1947 Copa del Generalísimo	–	3	0	2	1	4	6	−2
Total		42	36	6	10	113	55	+58

=== Players statistics ===
No.	Pos	Nat	Player	Total		1946–47 La Liga		1947 Copa del Generalísimo	
No.	Pos	Nat	Player	Apps	Goals	Apps	Goals	Apps	Goals
	GK	(Spain) ESP	José Bañón	18	-37	18	-37		
	DF	(Spain) ESP	Guillermo Pont	25	0	25	0		
	DF	(Spain) ESP	Pepe Corona	23	3	23	3		
	DF	(Spain) ESP	Querejeta	13	0	13	0		
	MF	(Spain) ESP	Ipiña	26	1	26	1		
	MF	(Spain) ESP	Félix Huete	23	0	23	0		
	MF	(Spain) ESP	Antonio Alsúa	22	9	22	9		
	MF	(Spain) ESP	Belmar	17	2	17	2		
	FW	(Spain) ESP	Pruden	25	22	25	22		
	FW	(Spain) ESP	Sabino Barinaga	17	4	17	4		
	FW	(Spain) ESP	Vidal	17	2	17	2		
	GK	(Spain) ESP	Marín	5	-8	5	-8		
	MF	(Spain) ESP	Luis Molowny	15	11	15	11		
	DF	(Spain) ESP	Clemente Fernández	10	0	10	0		
	MF	(Spain) ESP	Rafa	10	2	10	2		
	FW	(Spain) ESP	Arsuaga	7	2	7	2		
	GK	(Spain) ESP	Ferrus	2	-6	2	-6		
	MF	(Spain) ESP	Teran	4	0	4	0		
	MF	(Spain) ESP	Gallardo	3	2	3	2		
	FW	(Spain) ESP	Hermenegildo Elices Rivas	1	0	1	0		
	MF	(Spain) ESP	Moleiro	1	0	1	0		
	FW	(Spain) ESP	Jesús Alonso Fernández	1	0	1	0		
	GK	(Spain) ESP	Sureda	1	-5	1	-5		
