= 1945–46 Real Madrid CF season =

43rd season in existence of Real Madrid CF

Real Madrid Club de Futbol
1945–46 season
- President: Santiago Bernabéu
- Manager: Jacinto Quincoces
- Stadium: Chamartín
- Primera Division: 4th
- Copa del Generalísimo: Winners
- Top goalscorer: Pruden (20)
Home colours	Away colours

The 1945–46 season was Real Madrid Club de Fútbol's 43rd season in existence and the club's 14th consecutive season in the top flight of Spanish football.

== Summary ==
Under the management of Jacinto Quincoces, the club finished on a decent 4th spot in the league, five points below champions Sevilla CF. The squad also reached the 1946 Copa del Generalísimo Final after defeating Alcoyano and clinched its eighth cup title with a victory over Valencia CF, thanks to a Pruden brace and a goal from Sabino Barinaga.

== Squad ==
Note: Flags indicate national team as defined under FIFA eligibility rules; some limited exceptions apply. Players may hold more than one non-FIFA nationality.

No.	Pos.	Nation	Player
—	GK	ESP	José Bañón
—	DF	ESP	Clemente Fernández
—	DF	ESP	Pepe Corona
—	MF	ESP	Moleiro
—	MF	ESP	Ipiña
—	MF	ESP	Félix Huete
—	FW	ESP	Pablo Vidal
—	FW	ESP	Sabino Barinaga
—	FW	ESP	Pruden
—	FW	ESP	Nazario Belmar
—	FW	ESP	Elices

No.	Pos.	Nation	Player
—	GK	ESP	Marín
—	MF	ESP	Antonio Alsúa
—	MF	ESP	Elzo
—	MF	ESP	Angel Arzanegui
—	MF	ESP	Juanete
—	GK	ESP	José Luis Palacios Lazaro
—	MF	ESP	Teran
—	MF	ESP	Rafa
—	MF	ESP	José Canal Viñas
—	DF	ESP	Querejeta
—	MF	MEX	José Luis Borbolla

=== Transfers ===
In
Pos.	Name	from	Type
FW	Nazario Belmar	Sabadell	
GK	Marín		
MF	Juanete	Hércules CF	
GK	José Luis Palacios Lazaro	Atlético Aviación	
MF	Mariano Teran		
MF	Jose Canal Viñas		
MF	Rafael Alsua		

Out
Pos.	Name	To	Type
GK	Martin Pelayo	RCD Córdoba	
MF	Francisco Muñoz	RCD Córdoba	
MF	Castivia		
MF	Berridi		
FW	Senen Garcia Martinez		
FW	Camilo Roig		
FW	Pedrín		
FW	Juan Ochoantezana		
MF	Pablito		
FW	Botella		
MF	Benavente	Hércules CF	
MF	Juanete	RCD Córdoba	
GK	Palacios	Real Zaragoza	
DF	Azcarate	Real Zaragoza	
DF	Cortés	Real Zaragoza	

== Competitions ==
=== La Liga ===
==== Position by round ====
Round	1	2	3	4	5	6	7	8	9	10	11	12	13	14	15	16	17	18	19	20	21	22	23	24	25	26
Ground	H	A	H	A	H	A	H	A	H	A	H	H	A	A	H	A	H	A	H	A	H	A	H	A	A	H
Result	D	W	D	L	W	D	W	D	W	W	W	W	L	L	W	D	D	L	D	D	D	L	W	W	L	W
Position	7	2	2	7	3	5	4	4	3	2	1	1	1	3	2	3	3	5	5	5	4	5	4	4	4	4

Source: www.lfp.es
A = Away; H = Home; W = Win; D = Draw; L = Loss

==== League table ====
Pos	Team	Pld	W	D	L	GF	GA	GD	Pts
2	Barcelona	26	14	7	5	48	31	+17	35
3	Atlético Bilbao	26	14	5	7	63	38	+25	33
4	Real Madrid	26	11	9	6	46	30	+16	31
5	Oviedo	26	10	10	6	44	37	+7	30
6	Valencia	26	9	10	7	44	36	+8	28

Source: BDFútbol
Rules for classification: 1) points; 2) head-to-head points; 3) head-to-head goal difference; 4) goal difference; 5) number of goals scored.

==== Matches ====
23 September 1945 1	Real Madrid	1–1	Atletico de Bilbao	Madrid
		Report		Stadium: Chamartín

30 September 1945 2	CD Castellón	0–3	Real Madrid	Castellón de la Plana
	Soria 14'; Asensio 56'	Report	Pruden 20'; Pruden 68'; Barinaga 80'	Stadium: Castalia; Referee: Azón Roma

7 October 1945 3	Real Madrid	1–1	Valencia CF	Madrid
		Report		Stadium: Chamartín

14 October 1945 4	Sevilla CF	2–1	Real Madrid	Seville
		Report		Stadium: Nervión

21 October 1945 5	Real Madrid	3–1	Real Murcia	Madrid
		Report		Stadium: Chamartín

28 October 1945 6	Real Gijón	1–1	Real Madrid	Gijón
		Report		Stadium: El Molinón

4 November 1945 7	Real Madrid	3–1	Real Oviedo	Madrid
		Report		Stadium: Chamartín

18 November 1945 8	Español	1–1	Real Madrid	Barcelona
		Report		Stadium: Sarriá

25 November 1945 9	Real Madrid	3–2	FC Barcelona	Madrid
		Report		Stadium: Chamartín

2 December 1945 10	Alcoyano	1–3	Real Madrid	Alcoy
		Report		Stadium: El Collao

9 December 1945 11	Real Madrid	2–0	Hércules CF	Madrid
		[https://www.bdfutbol.com/es/p/p.php?id=2275 https://www.bdfutbol.com/es/p/p.php?id=2261 Report]		Stadium: Chamartín

16 December 1945 12	Real Madrid	2–1	Atletico Aviación	Madrid
		Report		Stadium: Chamartín

30 December 1945 13	Celta Vigo	3–0	Real Madrid	Vigo
		Report		Stadium: Estadio Balaídos

6 January 1946 14	Atletico de Bilbao	3–2	Real Madrid	Bilbao
		Report		Stadium: San Mamés

13 January 1946 15	Real Madrid	4–0	CD Castellón	Madrid
		Report		Stadium: Chamartín

20 January 1946 16	Valencia CF	1–1	Real Madrid	Valencia
		Report		Stadium: Mestalla

27 January 1946 17	Real Madrid	1–1	Sevilla CF	Madrid
		Report		Stadium: Chamartín

3 February 1946 18	Real Murcia	1–0	Real Madrid	Murcia
		Report		Stadium: La Condomina

10 February 1946 19	Real Madrid	2–2	Real Gijón	Madrid
		Report		Stadium: Chamartín

17 February 1946 20	Real Oviedo	1–1	Real Madrid	Oviedo
		Report		Stadium: Buenavista

24 February 1946 21	Real Madrid	0–0	Español	Madrid
		Report		Stadium: Chamartín

3 March 1946 22	FC Barcelona	1–0	Real Madrid	Barcelona
		Report		Stadium: Camp de Les Corts

10 March 1946 23	Real Madrid	1–0	Alcoyano	Madrid
		Report		Stadium: Chamartín

17 March 1946 24	Hércules CF	2–3	Real Madrid	Alicante
		Report		Stadium: Bardin

24 March 1946 25	Atlético Aviación	3–1	Real Madrid	Madrid
		Report		Stadium: Metropolitano

31 March 1946 26	Real Madrid	6–0	Celta de Vigo	Madrid
		Report		Stadium: Chamartín

=== Copa del Generalísimo ===
9 June 1946	Real Madrid CF	3–1	Valencia CF	Barcelona
17:30 CET	Barinaga 2'; Pruden 40', 52'	Report (in Spanish)	Gorostiza 81' (pen.)	Stadium: Montjuïc; Attendance: 60,000; Referee: José Martínez Íñiguez

== Statistics ==
=== Squad statistics ===
competition	points	total						GD
competition	points	G	V	N	P	Gf	Gs	GD
1945–46 La Liga	31	26	11	9	6	46	30	+16
1946 Copa del Generalísimo	–	3	0	2	1	4	6	−2
Total		42	36	6	10	113	55	+58

=== Players statistics ===
No.	Pos	Nat	Player	Total		1945–46 La Liga		1946 Copa del Generalísimo	
No.	Pos	Nat	Player	Apps	Goals	Apps	Goals	Apps	Goals
	GK	(Spain) ESP	José Bañón	25	-29	25	-29		
	DF	(Spain) ESP	Clemente Fernández	26	0	26	0		
	DF	(Spain) ESP	Pepe Corona	20	0	20	0		
	MF	(Spain) ESP	Moleiro	25	0	25	0		
	MF	(Spain) ESP	Ipiña	26	0	26	0		
	MF	(Spain) ESP	Félix Huete	26	0	26	0		
	FW	(Spain) ESP	Vidal	21	4	21	4		
	FW	(Spain) ESP	Sabino Barinaga	18	7	18	7		
	FW	(Spain) ESP	Pruden	23	20	23	20		
	FW	(Spain) ESP	Nazario Belmar	16	6	16	6		
	FW	(Spain) ESP	Elices	18	4	18	4		
	GK	(Spain) ESP	Marín	1	-1	1	-1		
	MF	(Spain) ESP	Antonio Alsúa	13	2	13	2		
	MF	(Spain) ESP	Elzo	7	0	7	0		
	MF	(Spain) ESP	Angel Arzanegui	6	0	6	0		
	MF	(Spain) ESP	Juanete	4	0	4	0		
	GK	(Spain) ESP	José Luis Palacios Lazaro	0	0	0	0		
	MF	(Spain) ESP	Teran	4	0	4	0		
	MF	(Spain) ESP	Rafa	3	0	3	0		
	MF	(Spain) ESP	José Canal Viñas	2	0	2	0		
	DF	(Spain) ESP	Querejeta	1	0	1	0		
	MF	(Mexico) MEX	José Luis Borbolla	1	0	1	0		
