= 1947–48 Real Madrid CF season =

45th season in existence of Real Madrid CF

Real Madrid Club de Futbol
1947–48 season
- President: Santiago Bernabéu
- Manager: Jacinto Quincoces (until 1 January 1948); Baltasar Albeniz (until 25 January 1948); Michael Keeping
- Stadium: Metropolitano (until 18 December 1947); Nuevo Chamartín
- Primera Division: 11th
- Copa del Generalísimo: Round of 16
- Copa Eva Duarte: Winners
- Top goalscorer: Luis Molowny (9)
Home colours	Away colours

The 1947–48 season was Real Madrid Club de Fútbol's 45th season in existence and the club's 16th consecutive season in the top flight of Spanish football.

== Summary ==
The season is best remembered as the worst league performance by the club in its history finishing on 11th spot avoiding relegation on the last round of the season in spite of a great campaign of midfielder Luis Molowny scoring nine goals.

Real Madrid wore squad numbers on their jerseys in the match against Atlético Madrid at the Estadio Metropolitano de Madrid on 23 November 1947, becoming the first team in La Liga to do so.

After three years of construction "Nuevo Chamartín" (New Chamartín Stadium) was inaugurated on 14 December 1947 with a match between Real Madrid and the Portuguese side Os Belenenses. The stadium had an initial capacity of 75,145 spectators.

Meanwhile, the club fired two managers until Michael Keeping was signed for the second part of the season improving the path for the squad included a controversial 1–1 against top-league team Atlético Madrid. The squad could reach a victory on 11 April 1948 against Real Oviedo 2–0 with a superb performance of Pruden saving Real Madrid from a relegation.

The campaign was the first with numbered shirts (measure pioneered in Europe by Arsenal F.C. since 1928) being the first match against local rivals Atlético Madrid with a 0–5 result.

After saving the category, the team was eliminated in the round of 16 of the Copa del Generalísimo by Espanyol, losing the two matches of the series.

== Squad ==
Note: Flags indicate national team as defined under FIFA eligibility rules; some limited exceptions apply. Players may hold more than one non-FIFA nationality.

No.	Pos.	Nation	Player
—	GK	ESP	José Bañón
—	DF	ESP	Pepe Corona
—	DF	ESP	Clemente Fernández
—	MF	ESP	Ortiz
—	MF	ESP	Ipiña
—	MF	ESP	Luis Molowny
—	MF	ESP	Félix Huete
—	FW	ESP	Sabino Barinaga
—	FW	CUB	Chus Alonso
—	FW	ESP	Pablo Vidal
—	FW	ESP	Macala

No.	Pos.	Nation	Player
—	GK	ESP	Calleja
—	MF	ESP	Antonio Alsúa
—	DF	ESP	Guillermo Pont
—	DF	ESP	Azcarate
—	FW	ESP	Pruden
—	GK	ESP	Marín
—	MF	ESP	Gallardo
—	MF	ESP	Moleiro
—	MF	ESP	Rafa
—	FW	ESP	Cabrera
—	FW	ESP	Arsuaga
—	MF	ARG	Rocha
—	FW	ARG	Navarro

=== Transfers ===
In
Pos.	Name	from	Type
MF	Antonio Ortiz	Santander	
FW	Macala	Hércules CF	
GK	Calleja	Santander	
FW	Miguel Cabrera		
MF	Manuel Rocha Bastos		
DF	José Navarro		

Out
Pos.	Name	To	Type
DF	José María Querejeta		
GK	Ferrús		
GK	Sureda		
MF	Elías		

== Competitions ==
=== La Liga ===
==== Position by round ====
Round	1	2	3	4	5	6	7	8	9	10	11	12	13	14	15	16	17	18	19	20	21	22	23	24	25	26
Ground	H	A	A	H	A	H	A	H	A	A	H	A	H	A	H	H	A	H	A	H	A	H	A	H	A	H
Result	D	D	D	D	L	W	L	W	L	L	W	L	W	L	L	W	L	L	D	L	W	D	L	D	L	W
Position	4	6	6	7	9	7	7	7	8	8	9	7	9	11	11	10	11	12	12	13	11	11	10	11	11	11

Source: www.lfp.es
A = Away; H = Home; W = Win; D = Draw; L = Loss

==== League table ====
Pos	Team	Pld	W	D	L	GF	GA	GD	Pts	Relegation
9	Oviedo	26	9	5	12	49	57	−8	23	
10	Alcoyano	26	9	4	13	40	52	−12	22	
11	Real Madrid	26	7	7	12	41	56	−15	21 (Note: Real Madrid finished ahead of Sabadell on head-to-head points: Sabadell–Real Madrid 1–1, Real Madrid–Sabadell 4–0.)	
12	Sabadell	26	9	3	14	41	62	−21	21	
13	Real Sociedad (R)	26	8	3	15	38	56	−18	19	Relegated to the Segunda División

Source: BDFútbol
Rules for classification: 1) points; 2) head-to-head points; 3) head-to-head goal difference; 4) goal difference; 5) number of goals scored.
(R) Relegated

==== Matches ====
21 September 1947 1	Real Madrid	2–2	Alcoyano	Madrid
	Rafa 20'; Pruden 58' (pen.)	Report	Soria 30'; Soria 34'	Stadium: Metropolitano; Referee: Arqué Martín

28 September 1947 2	Gimnástico de Tarragona	3–3	Real Madrid
		Report

5 October 1947 3	Sabadell	1–1	Real Madrid
		Report

12 October 1947 4	Real Madrid	1–1	FC Barcelona	Madrid
		Report		Stadium: Metropolitano

26 October 1947 5	Celta de Vigo	4–1	Real Madrid	Vigo
		Report

2 November 1947 6	Real Madrid	3–0	Real Sociedad	Madrid
		Report		Stadium: Metropolitano

9 November 1947 7	Real Gijón	2–0	Real Madrid
		Report

16 November 1947 8	Real Madrid	2–1	Sevilla CF	Madrid
		Report		Stadium: Metropolitano

23 November 1947 9	Atlético Madrid	5–0	Real Madrid	Madrid
		Report		Stadium: Estadio Metropolitano de Madrid

7 December 1947 10	Valencia CF	4–2	Real Madrid	Valencia
		Report

18 December 1947 11	Real Madrid	3–1	Español	Madrid
		Report		Stadium: Metropolitano

21 December 1947 12	Real Oviedo	7–1	Real Madrid	Oviedo
		Report

28 December 1947 13	Real Madrid	5–1	Atletico de Bilbao	Madrid
		Report		Stadium: Nuevo Chamartín

4 January 1948 14	Alcoyano	2–1	Real Madrid
		Report

11 January 1948 15	Real Madrid	1–3	Gimnastico de Tarragona	Madrid
				Stadium: Nuevo Chamartín

18 January 1948 16	Real Madrid	4–0	Sabadell	Madrid
				Stadium: Nuevo Chamartín

25 January 1948 17	FC Barcelona	4–2	Real Madrid	Barcelona
				Stadium: Camp de Les Corts

1 February 1948 18	Real Madrid	1–4	Celta de Vigo	Madrid
				Stadium: Nuevo Chamartín

8 February 1948 19	Real Sociedad	1–1	Real Madrid

15 February 1948 20	Real Madrid	0–1	Real Gijón	Madrid
				Stadium: Nuevo Chamartín

22 February 1948 21	Sevilla CF	2–3	Real Madrid

29 February 1948 22	Real Madrid	1–1	Atlético Madrid	Madrid
				Stadium: Nuevo Chamartín; Attendance: 72 125

7 March 1948 23	Español	2–0	Real Madrid

28 March 1948 24	Real Madrid	1–1	Valencia CF	Madrid
				Stadium: Nuevo Chamartín

4 April 1948 25	Atletico de Bilbao	3–0	Real Madrid

11 April 1948 26	Real Madrid	2–0	Real Oviedo	Madrid
				Stadium: Nuevo Chamartín

=== Copa del Generalísimo ===
==== Fifth round ====
18 April 1948	Real Madrid	1–0	RCD Córdoba	Madrid
				Stadium: Estadio Metropolitano

==== Sixth round ====
25 April 1948	Real Madrid	4–2	CD Málaga	Madrid
				Stadium: Estadio Metropolitano

==== Round of 16 ====
2 May 1948	Español	2–1	Real Madrid	Barcelona

9 May 1948	Real Madrid	0–1	Español	Madrid
				Stadium: Estadio Metropolitano

=== Copa Eva Duarte ===
6 June 1948	Real Madrid	3–1 aet	Valencia CF	Madrid
	Macala 50'; Montalvo 93'; Alonso 99'		Seguí 36'	Stadium: Nuevo Chamartín; Attendance: 15,000; Referee: Azón

== Statistics ==
=== Squad statistics ===
competition	points	total						GD
competition	points	G	V	N	P	Gf	Gs	GD
1947–48 La Liga	34	21	7	7	12	67	42	+25
1947–48 Copa del Generalísimo	–	3	0	2	1	4	6	−2
Total		42	36	6	10	113	55	+58

=== Players statistics ===
No.	Pos	Nat	Player	Total		1947–48 La Liga		1947–48 Copa del Generalísimo	
No.	Pos	Nat	Player	Apps	Goals	Apps	Goals	Apps	Goals
	GK	(Spain) ESP	José Bañón	17	-34	17	-34		
	DF	(Spain) ESP	Pepe Corona	21	0	21	0		
	DF	(Spain) ESP	Clemente Fernández	17	0	17	0		
	MF	(Spain) ESP	Ortiz	20	0	20	0		
	MF	(Spain) ESP	Ipiña	19	0	19	0		
	MF	(Spain) ESP	Luis Molowny	19	9	19	9		
	MF	(Spain) ESP	Félix Huete	18	0	18	0		
	FW	(Spain) ESP	Sabino Barinaga	21	7	21	7		
	FW	(Cuba) CUB	Chus Alonso	16	6	16	6		
	FW	(Spain) ESP	Vidal	15	3	15	3		
	FW	(Spain) ESP	Macala	11	0	11	0		
	GK	(Spain) ESP	Calleja	6	-16	6	-16		
	MF	(Spain) ESP	Antonio Alsúa	15	2	15	2		
	DF	(Spain) ESP	Guillermo Pont	14	0	14	0		
	DF	(Spain) ESP	Azcarate	12	0	12	0		
	FW	(Spain) ESP	Pruden	11	3	11	3		
	GK	(Spain) ESP	Marín	3	-6	3	-6		
	MF	(Spain) ESP	Gallardo	9	8	9	8		
	MF	(Spain) ESP	Moleiro	6	0	6	0		
	MF	(Spain) ESP	Rafa	6	2	6	2		
	FW	(Spain) ESP	Cabrera	4	0	4	0		
	FW	(Spain) ESP	Arsuaga	4	0	4	0		
	MF	(Argentina) ARG	Rocha	1	0	1	0		
	FW	(Argentina) ARG	Navarro	1	0	1	0		

- Source: http://www.bdfutbol.com/en/t/t1948-492.html
