= 1944–45 Real Madrid CF season =

42nd season in existence of Real Madrid CF

Real Madrid Club de Futbol
1944–45 season
- President: Santiago Bernabéu
- Manager: Ramon Encinas
- Stadium: Chamartín
- Primera Division: 2nd
- Copa del Generalísimo: Round of 16
- Top goalscorer: League: Sabino Barinaga (18); All: Sabino Barinaga (19)
Home colours	Away colours

The 1944–45 season was Real Madrid Club de Fútbol's 42nd season in existence and the club's 13th consecutive season in the top flight of Spanish football.

== Summary ==
The club finished second in the league, just one point below champions CF Barcelona under management of Ramon Encinas. The team remained in contention for the title until match day 21, when archrivals Barcelona defeated Madrid 5–0 and shattered its chances to reclaim the championship. The squad reached the Copa del Generalísimo round of 16 after defeating SD Ceuta, but was eliminated in a playoff (tiebreaker) match by Sevilla. Barinaga scored and Pruden added two goals.

On 27 October 1944, the club started the construction of the new stadium at Chamartín.

== Squad ==
Note: Flags indicate national team as defined under FIFA eligibility rules; some limited exceptions apply. Players may hold more than one non-FIFA nationality.

No.	Pos.	Nation	Player
—	GK	ESP	José Bañón
—	DF	ESP	Pepe Corona
—	DF	ESP	Querejeta
—	MF	ESP	Félix Huete
—	MF	ESP	Ipiña
—	MF	ESP	Rafa
—	MF	ESP	Moleiro
—	MF	ESP	Antonio Alsúa
—	FW	ESP	Sabino Barinaga
—	FW	ESP	Pablo Vidal
—	FW	CUB	Chus Alonso

No.	Pos.	Nation	Player
—	GK	ESP	Martin
—	MF	ESP	Francisco Muñoz Martin
—	FW	ESP	Elices
—	DF	ESP	Clemente Fernández
—	FW	ESP	Pruden
—	FW	ESP	José María Castivia
—	MF	ESP	Berridi
—	MF	ESP	Elzo
—	MF	ESP	Elías Paramio Alvarez
—	FW	ESP	Porro
—	FW	ESP	Cuca
—	FW	ESP	Camilo Roig
—	FW	ESP	Pedrin
—	FW	MEX	Jose Luis Borbolla

=== Transfers ===
In
Pos.	Name	from	Type
FW	Nazario Belmar	Sabadell	
GK	Marín		
MF	Juanete	Hércules CF	
GK	José Luis Palacios Lazaro	Atlético Aviación	
FW	Pablo Vidal	Mallorca	
MF	Jose Canal Viñas		
MF	Rafael Alsua		
MF	Jose Luis Borbolla	Club Deportivo Marte	

Out
Pos.	Name	To	Type
GK	Martin Pelayo	RCD Córdoba	
MF	Francisco Muñoz	RCD Córdoba	
MF	Castivia		
MF	Berridi		
FW	Senen Garcia Martinez		
FW	Camilo Roig		
FW	Pedrín		
FW	Juan Ochoantezana		
MF	Pablito		
FW	Botella		
MF	Benavente	Hércules CF	
MF	Juanete	RCD Córdoba	
GK	Palacios	Real Zaragoza	
DF	Azcarate	Real Zaragoza	
DF	Cortés	Real Zaragoza	

== Competitions ==
=== La Liga ===
==== Position by round ====
Round	1	2	3	4	5	6	7	8	9	10	11	12	13	14	15	16	17	18	19	20	21	22	23	24	25	26
Ground	A	H	A	H	A	H	A	H	A	H	A	H	A	H	A	H	A	H	A	H	A	H	A	H	A	H
Result	L	W	D	D	L	W	W	W	W	W	L	W	W	W	L	W	L	W	W	W	L	W	W	W	W	W
Position	14	8	8	8	10	8	7	5	2	2	3	2	2	1	2	1	2	2	2	2	2	2	2	2	2	2

Source: www.lfp.es
A = Away; H = Home; W = Win; D = Draw; L = Loss

==== League table ====
Pos	Team	Pld	W	D	L	GF	GA	GD	Pts
1	Barcelona (C)	26	17	5	4	50	30	+20	39
2	Real Madrid	26	18	2	6	68	35	+33	38
3	Atlético Aviación	26	13	5	8	46	41	+5	31 (Note: Atlético Aviación finished ahead of Oviedo on overall goal difference.)
4	Oviedo	26	13	5	8	50	48	+2	31
5	Valencia	26	12	6	8	61	35	+26	30 (Note: Valencia finished ahead of Atlético Bilbao on head-to-head points: Valencia–Atlético Bilbao 3–0, Atlético Bilbao–Valencia 1–1.)

Source: BDFútbol
Rules for classification: 1) points; 2) head-to-head points; 3) head-to-head goal difference; 4) goal difference; 5) number of goals scored.
(C) Champions

==== Matches ====
24 September 1944 1	Real Oviedo	4–0	Real Madrid	Oviedo
				Stadium: Buenavista

1 October 1944 2	Real Madrid	3–0	Español	Madrid
				Stadium: Chamartín

8 October 1944 3	Deportivo La Coruña	2–2	Real Madrid	A Coruña
				Stadium: Riazor

15 October 1944 4	Real Madrid	1–1	Valencia CF	Madrid
				Stadium: Chamartín

22 October 1944 5	Atletico de Bilbao	2–1	Real Madrid	Bilbao
				Stadium: San Mamés

29 October 1944 6	Real Madrid	5–0	Sevilla CF	Madrid
				Stadium: Chamartín

5 November 1944 7	Atletico Aviación	0–1	Real Madrid	Madrid
				Stadium: Chamartín

12 November 1944 8	Real Madrid	1–0	FC Barcelona	Madrid
		Report		Stadium: Chamartín

19 November 1944 9	Granada CF	0–1	Real Madrid	Granada
				Stadium: Los Carmenes

26 November 1944 10	Real Madrid	2–1	CD Castellón	Madrid
		Report		Stadium: Chamartín

3 December 1944 11	CE Sabadell CF	3–2	Real Madrid	Sabadell
				Stadium: Bardin

10 December 1944 12	Real Madrid	2–1	Real Murcia	Madrid
				Stadium: Chamartín

17 December 1944 13	Real Gijón	0–1	Real Madrid	Gijón
				Stadium: El Molinón

7 January 1945 14	Real Madrid	4–1	Real Oviedo	Madrid
				Stadium: Chamartín

14 January 1945 15	Español	2–0	Real Madrid	Barcelona
				Stadium: Sarriá

28 January 1945 16	Real Madrid	6–0	Deportivo La Coruña	Madrid
				Stadium: Chamartín

4 February 1945 17	Valencia CF	4–1	Real Madrid	Valencia
				Stadium: Mestalla

18 February 1945 18	Real Madrid	4–1	Atletico de Bilbao	Madrid
		Report		Stadium: Chamartín

25 February 1945 19	Sevilla CF	1–2	Real Madrid	Seville
				Stadium: Nervión

18 March 1945 20	Real Madrid	3–1	Atlético Aviación	Madrid
				Stadium: Chamartín

25 March 1945 21	FC Barcelona	5–0	Real Madrid	Barcelona
		Report		Stadium: Camp de Les Corts

8 April 1945 22	Real Madrid	6–2	Granada CF	Madrid
				Stadium: Chamartín

15 April 1945 23	CD Castellón	0–3	Real Madrid	Castellón de la Plana
				Stadium: El Sequiol

22 April 1945 24	Real Madrid	8–0	CE Sabadell CF	Madrid
				Stadium: Chamartín

13 May 1945 25	Real Murcia	3–5	Real Madrid	Murcia
				Stadium: La Condomina

20 May 1945 26	Real Madrid	4–1	Real Gijón	Madrid
				Stadium: Chamartín

=== Copa del Generalísimo ===
==== First round ====
31 December 1944	SD Ceuta	0–4	Real Madrid CF	Ceuta

21 January 1945	Real Madrid CF	5–1	SD Ceuta	Madrid
				Stadium: Chamartín

==== Round of 16 ====
11 February 1945	Sevilla CF	1–0	Real Madrid CF	Sevilla
				Stadium: Estadio de Nervion

4 March 1945	Real Madrid CF	2–1	Sevilla CF	Madrid
				Stadium: Chamartín

21 March 1945 Tie breaker	Sevilla CF	2–0	Real Madrid CF	Valencia
	Mateo 27' (pen.); Campos 58'	Report		Stadium: Estadio Mestalla; Referee: Cruella Tena

== Statistics ==
=== Squad statistics ===
competition	points	total						GD
competition	points	G	V	N	P	Gf	Gs	GD
1944–45 La Liga	38	26	18	2	6	68	35	+33
1945 Copa del Generalísimo	–	5	2	1	2	12	5	+7
Total		42	36	6	10		55	+58

=== Players statistics ===
No.	Pos	Nat	Player	Total		Primera Division		Copa del Generalisimo	
No.	Pos	Nat	Player	Apps	Goals	Apps	Goals	Apps	Goals
	GK	(Spain) ESP	José Bañón	30	-39	26	-35	4	-4
	DF	(Spain) ESP	Pepe Corona	31	2	26	2	5	0
	DF	(Spain) ESP	Querejeta	22	0	19	0	3	0
	MF	(Spain) ESP	Félix Huete	31	1	26	1	5	0
	MF	(Spain) ESP	Ipiña	31	3	26	3	5	0
	MF	(Spain) ESP	Rafa	27	13	23	10	4	3
	MF	(Spain) ESP	Moleiro	23	1	19	1	4	0
	MF	(Spain) ESP	Antonio Alsúa	21	8	17	7	4	1
	FW	(Spain) ESP	Sabino Barinaga	28	18	24	17	4	1
	FW	(Spain) ESP	Pablo Vidal	17	8	14	7	3	1
	FW	(Cuba) CUB	Chus Alonso	15	8	11	7	4	1
	GK	(Spain) ESP	Martin	1	-1	0	0	1	-1
	MF	(Spain) ESP	Francisco Muñoz Martin	12	4	12	4		
	FW	(Spain) ESP	Elices	11	1	9	1	2	0
	DF	(Spain) ESP	Clemente Fernández	9	0	7	0	2	0
	FW	(Spain) ESP	Pruden	8	7	6	5	2	2
	FW	(Spain) ESP	José María Castivia	7	0	6	0	1	0
	MF	(Spain) ESP	Berridi	5	0	5	0		
	MF	(Spain) ESP	Elzo	4	2	4	2		
	MF	(Spain) ESP	Elías Paramio Alvarez	2	0	2	0		
	FW	(Spain) ESP	Porro	2	1	1	0	1	1
	FW	(Spain) ESP	Cuca	1	0	1	0		
	FW	(Spain) ESP	Camilo Roig	1	0	1	0		
	FW	(Spain) ESP	Pedrin	1	0	1	0		
	FW	(Mexico) MEX	José Luis Borbolla	1	1	0	0	1	1

- Source: http://www.bdfutbol.com/en/t/t1944-452.html
