= 1943–44 Real Madrid CF season =

41st season in existence of Real Madrid CF

Real Madrid Club de Futbol
1943–44 season
- President: Antonio Santos Peralba (until 11 September 1943); Santiago Bernabéu
- Manager: Ramon Encinas
- Stadium: Chamartín
- Primera Division: 7th
- Copa del Generalísimo: Round of 16
- Top goalscorer: Barinaga (20)
- Biggest win: 11–1 vs Barcelona
Home colours	Away colours

The 1943–44 season was Real Madrid Club de Fútbol's 41st season in existence and the club's 12th consecutive season in the top flight of Spanish football.

== Summary ==
A new Executive Board arrived on 11 September 1943, and the club appointed Santiago Bernabéu as its new president. The squad finished seventh in the league, 12 points below champions Valencia. in the first season of Ramon Encinas as head coach. On 16 July 1944, the club played the only match in its history against UD Melilla (until 2018). After 11 years in the club, midfielder Sauto announced his retirement. In the Copa del Generalísimo, the squad was eliminated in the round of 16 by underdogs Granada CF after being shockingly defeated 0–2 in Madrid.

== Squad ==
Note: Flags indicate national team as defined under FIFA eligibility rules; some limited exceptions apply. Players may hold more than one non-FIFA nationality.

No.	Pos.	Nation	Player
—	GK	ESP	José Bañón
—	DF	ESP	Pepe Corona
—	DF	ESP	Querejeta
—	MF	ESP	Ipiña
—	MF	ESP	Félix Huete
—	MF	ESP	Antonio Alsúa
—	MF	MEX	Sauto
—	FW	ESP	Sabino Barinaga
—	FW	ESP	Pruden
—	FW	CUB	Chus Alonso
—	FW	ESP	Botella

No.	Pos.	Nation	Player
—	GK	ESP	Marzá
—	FW	ESP	Pedrin
—	MF	ESP	Tamargo
—	MF	ESP	Elías Paramio Alvarez
—	FW	ESP	Cuca
—	GK	ESP	Martín
—	MF	ESP	Moleiro
—	MF	ESP	Rafael Alsúa
—	DF	ESP	Arzanegui
—	DF	ESP	Medrano
—	DF	ESP	Cantero
—	FW	ESP	Manuel Alday
—	MF	ESP	Tormo
—	FW	ESP	Chuchi
—	FW	ESP	Ochoa
—	FW	ESP	Gil

=== Transfers ===
In
Pos.	Name	from	Type
GK	José Bañón	Elche CF	
FW	Pedrin	Real Oviedo	
MF	Tamargo	Deportivo La Coruña	
MF	Elías	Ferroviaría	
GK	Martin	Atlético Aviación	
MF	Jose Canal Viñas		
MF	Rafael Alsúa	Osasuna	
MF	Jose Luis Borbolla	Club Deportivo Marte	

Out
Pos.	Name	To	Type
DF	Clemente Fernández	Hércules CF	
DF	Mardones	CE Sabadell CF	
GK	Esquiva		
MF	Rovira	Español	
FW	Arbiza	Real Sociedad	
GK	Sepulveda		
FW	Sanz		
FW	Serra		
GK	Galarraga	Real Sociedad	
FW	Sauer	Real Valladolid	
MF	Benavente	Hércules CF	
MF	Juanete	RCD Córdoba	
GK	Palacios	Real Zaragoza	
DF	Azcarate	Real Zaragoza	
DF	Cortés	Real Zaragoza	

== Competitions ==
=== La Liga ===
==== Position by round ====
Round	1	2	3	4	5	6	7	8	9	10	11	12	13	14	15	16	17	18	19	20	21	22	23	24	25	26
Ground	A	H	A	H	A	H	A	H	A	H	H	A	H	H	A	H	A	H	A	H	A	H	A	A	H	A
Result	D	L	D	W	L	W	L	W	W	W	L	L	L	W	D	D	L	W	D	W	L	W	L	W	D	W
Position	9	11	9	9	9	7	8	7	6	5	5	6	8	8	8	8	8	8	8	7	7	7	7	6	7	7

Source: www.lfp.es
A = Away; H = Home; W = Win; D = Draw; L = Loss

==== League table ====
Pos	Team	Pld	W	D	L	GF	GA	GD	Pts
5	Castellón	26	13	3	10	42	36	+6	29 (Note: Oviedo finished ahead of Castellón on head-to-head goal difference: Castellón–Oviedo 2–0, Oviedo–Castellón 3–0.)
6	Barcelona	26	10	8	8	59	46	+13	28 (Note: Barcelona finished ahead of Real Madrid on overall goal difference.)
7	Real Madrid	26	11	6	9	48	38	+10	28
8	Granada	26	9	8	9	41	46	−5	26
9	Sabadell	26	11	3	12	53	60	−7	25 (Note: Sabadell finished ahead of Atlético Bilbao on head-to-head goal difference: Sabadell–Atlético Bilbao 5–1, Atlético Bilbao–Sabadell 4–3.)

Source: BDFútbol
Rules for classification: 1) points; 2) head-to-head points; 3) head-to-head goal difference; 4) goal difference; 5) number of goals scored.

==== Matches ====
26 September 1943 1	Deportivo La Coruña	2–2	Real Madrid	La Coruña
		Report		Stadium: Estadio Riazor

3 October 1943 2	Real Madrid	3–5	Sevilla CF	Madrid
		Report		Stadium: Chamartín

10 October 1943 3	Granada CF	2–2	Real Madrid	Granada
		Report		Stadium: Los Carmenes

17 October 1943 4	Real Madrid	3–2	Atlético Aviación	Madrid
		Report		Stadium: Chamartín

24 October 1943 5	CD Castellón	2–1	Real Madrid	Castellón de la Plana
		Report

7 November 1943 6	Real Madrid	3–1	Español	Madrid
		Report		Stadium: Chamartín

14 November 1943 7	Celta	1–0	Real Madrid	Vigo
		Report		Stadium: Balaídos

23 November 1943 8	Real Madrid	2–1	Real Oviedo	Madrid
		Report		Stadium: Chamartín

28 November 1943 9	CE Sabadell CF	1–3	Real Madrid	Sabadell
		Report		Stadium: Estadi Creu Alta

5 December 1943 10	Real Madrid	4–1	Real Sociedad	Madrid
		Report		Stadium: Chamartín

12 December 1943 11	Real Madrid	1–3	Athletic Bilbao	Madrid
		Report		Stadium: Chamartín

19 December 1943 12	Valencia CF	1–0	Real Madrid
		Report

2 January 1944 13	Real Madrid	0–1	FC Barcelona	Madrid
		Report		Stadium: Chamartín

9 January 1944 14	Real Madrid	3–0	Deportivo La Coruña	Madrid
		Report		Stadium: Chamartín

16 January 1944 15	Sevilla CF	1–1	Real Madrid
		Report

23 January 1944 16	Real Madrid	2–2	Granada CF	Madrid
		Report		Stadium: Chamartín

30 January 1944 17	Atlético Aviación	3–1	Real Madrid
		Report

6 February 1944 18	Real Madrid	3–0	CD Castellón	Madrid
		Report		Stadium: Chamartín

13 February 1944 19	Español	1–1	Real Madrid
		Report

20 February 1944 20	Real Madrid	3–0	Celta	Madrid
		Report		Stadium: Chamartín

5 March 1944 21	Real Oviedo	2–0	Real Madrid
		Report

12 March 1944 22	Real Madrid	4–1	CE Sabadell CF	Madrid
		Report		Stadium: Chamartín

19 March 1944 23	Real Sociedad	2–1	Real Madrid
		Report

26 March 1944 24	Athletic Bilbao	1–2	Real Madrid
		Report

2 April 1944 25	Real Madrid	1–1	Valencia CF	Madrid
		Report		Stadium: Chamartín

9 April 1944 26	FC Barcelona	1–2	Real Madrid
		Report

=== Copa del Generalísimo ===
==== Round of 32 ====
30 April 1944	Real Madrid	4–2	Real Betis	Madrid
		Report		Stadium: Chamartín

7 May 1944	Real Betis	1–4	Real Madrid
		Report

==== Round of 16 ====
14 May 1944	Granada CF	0–0	Real Madrid
		Report

21 May 1944	Real Madrid	0–2	Granada CF	Madrid
		Report		Stadium: Chamartín

=== President's Cup of the Castellana Federation ===
8 December 1943	Real Madrid CF	5–0	Atlético Aviación	Chamartín de la Rosa
	Barinaga 2' 20'; Moleiro 62'; Alonso II 65'; Cuca 88'	Report		Stadium: Chamartín; Referee: Melcon

== Statistics ==
=== Squad statistics ===
competition	points	total						GD
competition	points	G	V	N	P	Gf	Gs	GD
1943–44 La Liga	31	26	11	9	6	46	30	+16
1944 Copa del Generalísimo	–	3	0	2	1	4	6	−2
Total		42	36	6	10	113	55	+58

=== Players statistics ===
No.	Pos	Nat	Player	Total		Primera Division		1944 Copa del Generalísimo	
No.	Pos	Nat	Player	Apps	Goals	Apps	Goals	Apps	Goals
	GK	(Spain) ESP	José Bañón	24	-31	24	-31		
	DF	(Spain) ESP	Pepe Corona	26	2	26	2		
	DF	(Spain) ESP	Querejeta	18	0	18	0		
	MF	(Spain) ESP	Ipiña	26	0	26	0		
	MF	(Spain) ESP	Felix Huete	25	0	25	0		
	MF	(Spain) ESP	Antonio Alsúa	19	3	19	3		
	MF	(Mexico) MEX	Sauto	16	0	16	0		
	FW	(Spain) ESP	Sabino Barinaga	24	20	24	20		
	FW	(Spain) ESP	Pruden	16	8	16	8		
	FW	(Cuba) CUB	Chus Alonso	12	3	12	3		
	FW	(Spain) ESP	Botella	12	4	12	4		
	GK	(Spain) ESP	Marzá	2	-7	2	-7		
	FW	(Spain) ESP	Pedrin	9	2	9	2		
	MF	(Spain) ESP	Tamargo	7	0	7	0		
	MF	(Spain) ESP	Elías Paramio Alvarez	7	0	7	0		
	FW	(Spain) ESP	Cuca	7	1	7	1		
	GK	(Spain) ESP	Martín	0	0	0	0		
	MF	(Spain) ESP	Moleiro	5	1	5	1		
	MF	(Spain) ESP	Rafael Alsúa	5	0	5	0		
	DF	(Spain) ESP	Arzanegui	4	0	4	0		
	DF	(Spain) ESP	Medrano	4	0	4	0		
	DF	(Spain) ESP	Cantero	3	1	3	1		
	FW	(Spain) ESP	Manuel Alday	3	0	3	0		
	MF	(Spain) ESP	Tormo	2	0	2	0		
	FW	(Spain) ESP	Chuchi	2	0	2	0		
	FW	(Spain) ESP	Ochoa	1	0	1	0		
	FW	(Spain) ESP	Gil	1	0	1	0		

- Source: http://www.bdfutbol.com/en/t/t1943-442.html
