= 1947 Copa del Generalísimo final =

Copa del Generalísimo 1947 final
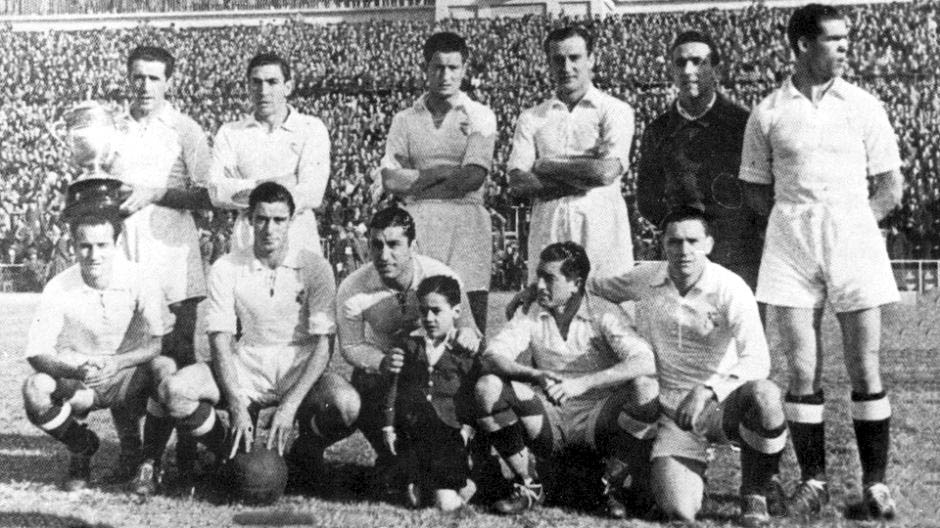
- Real Madrid, champions
- Event: 1947 Copa del Generalísimo
Real Madrid	Espanyol
2	0
- Date: 22 June 1947
- Venue: Estadio Riazor, La Coruña
- Referee: Francisco Echave
- Attendance: 30,000

The Copa del Generalísimo 1947 final was the 45th final of the King's Cup. The final was played at the Estadio Riazor in La Coruña, on 22 June 1947, being won by Real Madrid CF, who beat RCD Español 2–0 after extra time.

== Details ==
22 June 1947
18:00 CET

Real Madrid	2–0 (a.e.t.)	Espanyol
Vidal 107'; Pruden 119'	Report

Estadio Riazor, La Coruña
Attendance: 30,000
Referee: Francisco Echave

Real Madrid
Espanyol

GK	1	(Spain) José Bañón
DF	2	(Spain) Clemente
DF	3	(Spain) José Corona
MF	4	(Spain) Guillermo Pont
MF	5	(Spain) Juan Antonio Ipiña (c)
MF	6	(Spain) Félix Huete
FW	7	(Spain) Antonio Alsúa
FW	8	(Spain) Sabino Barinaga
FW	9	(Spain) Pruden
FW	10	(Spain) Luis Molowny
FW	11	(Spain) Pablo Vidal
Manager:
(Spain) Baltasar Albéniz

GK	1	(Spain) José Trías
DF	2	(Spain) José Casas
DF	3	(Spain) José Mariscal (c)
MF	4	(Spain) Ramón Celma
MF	5	(Spain) Antonio Fàbregas
MF	6	(Spain) Félix Llimós
FW	7	(Spain) Rosendo Hernández
FW	8	(Spain) Gabriel Jorge
FW	9	(Spain) Ángel Calvo
FW	10	(Spain) Vicente Hernández
FW	11	(Spain) Ernesto Galobart
Manager:
(Spain) José Planas
