= 1948–49 Real Madrid CF season =

46th season in existence of Real Madrid CF

Real Madrid Club de Futbol
1948–49 season
- President: Santiago Bernabéu
- Manager: Michael Keeping
- Stadium: Nuevo Chamartín
- Primera Division: 3rd
- Copa del Generalísimo: Round of 16
- Top goalscorer: Pahiño (21)
Home colours	Away colours

The 1948–49 season was Real Madrid Club de Fútbol's 46th season in existence and the club's 17th consecutive season in the top flight of Spanish football.

== Summary ==
During summer Bernabeu reinforced the team with several players including young star midfielder Pablo Olmedo, midfielder Miguel Muñoz and top goalscorer Pahiño came from Celta Vigo, and midfielder Jesus Narro was bought from Real Murcia. In the league the squad reached the first spot after ten matchdays, but then collapsed to ultimately finish in the 3rd spot. New arrival forward Pahiño played in a superb form scoring 21 goals. In June, the club advanced to the 1948–49 Copa del Generalísimo round of 16 where they were defeated by Atletico de Bilbao in a playoff game after two draws.

== Squad ==
Note: Flags indicate national team as defined under FIFA eligibility rules; some limited exceptions apply. Players may hold more than one non-FIFA nationality.

No.	Pos.	Nation	Player
—	GK	(Spain) ESP	José Bañón
—	DF	(Spain) ESP	Clemente Fernández
—	DF	(Spain) ESP	Azcarate
—	DF	(Spain) ESP	Guillermo Pont
—	MF	(Spain) ESP	Pablo Olmedo
—	MF	(Spain) ESP	Miguel Muñoz
—	MF	(Spain) ESP	Narro
—	MF	(Spain) ESP	Montalvo
—	FW	(Spain) ESP	Pahiño
—	FW	(Spain) ESP	Macala
—	FW	(Spain) ESP	Sabino Barinaga

No.	Pos.	Nation	Player
—	GK	(Spain) ESP	Adauto
—	FW	(Spain) ESP	Arsuaga
—	MF	(Spain) ESP	Ipiña
—	DF	(Spain) ESP	José Mariscal
—	DF	(Spain) ESP	Javier Marcet
—	FW	(Spain) ESP	Pablo Vidal
—	GK	(Spain) ESP	Garcia Martin
—	DF	(Spain) ESP	Soto
—	MF	(Spain) ESP	Luis Molowny
—	DF	(Argentina) ARG	Navarro
—	MF	(Scotland) SCO	John Fox Watson

=== Transfers ===
In
Pos.	Name	from	Type
MF	Pablo Olmedo Garmendia		
MF	Miguel Muñoz	Celta Vigo	
FW	Jesus Narro	Real Murcia	
FW	Pahiño	Celta Vigo	
GK	Adauto		
DF	Mariscal	Español	
MF	Marcet	CD Castellón	
MF	John Fox Watson	Fulham FC	
DF	Soto		
GK	García Martin	CD Málaga	

Out
Pos.	Name	To	Type
FW	Pruden		
MF	Huete	Racing Santander	
GK	Calleja		
MF	Alsúa	Gimnastica de Tarragona	

== Competitions ==
=== La Liga ===
==== Position by round ====
Round	1	2	3	4	5	6	7	8	9	10	11	12	13	14	15	16	17	18	19	20	21	22	23	24	25	26
Ground	A	H	A	H	A	H	A	H	A	H	H	A	H	H	A	H	A	H	A	H	A	H	A	A	H	A
Result	W	L	D	L	W	W	W	W	D	W	W	D	W	W	L	W	W	W	L	W	L	L	L	W	W	D
Position	5	8	9	12	8	5	5	4	3	1	1	1	1	1	2	1	1	1	2	2	2	2	3	3	2	3

Source: www.lfp.es
A = Away; H = Home; W = Win; D = Draw; L = Loss

==== League table ====
Pos	Team	Pld	W	D	L	GF	GA	GD	Pts	Qualification or relegation
1	Barcelona (C)	26	16	5	5	66	36	+30	37	Qualification for the Latin Cup
2	Valencia	26	16	3	7	78	47	+31	35	
3	Real Madrid	26	15	4	7	67	42	+25	34 (Note: Real Madrid finished ahead of Atlético Madrid on head-to-head goal difference: Atlético Madrid–Real Madrid 0–2, Real Madrid–Atlético Madrid 1–2.)	
4	Atlético Madrid	26	15	4	7	54	32	+22	34	
5	Oviedo	26	13	4	9	50	43	+7	30	

Source: BDFútbol
Rules for classification: 1) points; 2) head-to-head points; 3) head-to-head goal difference; 4) goal difference; 5) number of goals scored.
(C) Champions

==== Matches ====
12 September 1948 1	CE Sabadell	1–2	Real Madrid	Sabadell
		Report		Stadium: Cruz Alta

19 September 1948 2	Real Madrid	1–2	CF Barcelona	Madrid
		Report		Stadium: Nuevo Chamartín

26 September 1948 3	Valencia CF	4–4	Real Madrid	Valencia
		Report		Stadium: Estadio Mestalla

3 October 1948 4	Real Madrid	1–2	Atlético Madrid	Madrid
		Report		Stadium: Nuevo Chamartín

10 October 1948 5	Atletico de Bilbao	2–3	Real Madrid	Bilbao
		Report		Stadium: San Mamés

17 October 1948 6	Real Madrid	4–1	Real Valladolid	Madrid
		Report		Stadium: Nuevo Chamartín

24 October 1948 7	Sevilla CF	1–5	Real Madrid	Sevilla
		Report		Stadium: Nervión

31 October 1948 8	Real Madrid	3–1	Español	Madrid
		Report		Stadium: Nuevo Chamartín

7 November 1948 9	Real Oviedo	1–1	Real Madrid	Oviedo
		Report		Stadium: Carlos Tartiere

14 November 1948 10	Real Madrid	6–0	Celta Vigo	Madrid
		Report		Stadium: Nuevo Chamartín

21 November 1948 11	Real Madrid	3–1	Deportivo La Coruña	Madrid
		Report		Stadium: Nuevo Chamartín

28 November 1948 12	Gimnastica de Tarragona	3–3	Real Madrid	Tarragona
		Report		Stadium: Estadio de la Avenida Cataluña

5 December 1948 13	Real Madrid	3–1	Alcoyano	Madrid
		Report		Stadium: Nuevo Chamartín

12 December 1948 14	Real Madrid	5–1	CE Sabadell	Madrid
		Report		Stadium: Nuevo Chamartín

9 January 1949 15	CF Barcelona	3–1	Real Madrid	Barcelona
		Report		Stadium: Camp de Les Corts

16 January 1949 16	Real Madrid	4–3	Valencia CF	Madrid
		Report		Stadium: Nuevo Chamartín

23 January 1949 17	Atlético Madrid	0–2	Real Madrid	Madrid
		Report		Stadium: Metropolitano

30 January 1949 18	Real Madrid	4–2	Atletico de Bilbao	Madrid
		Report		Stadium: Nuevo Chamartín

6 February 1949 19	Real Valladolid	2–0	Real Madrid	Valladolid
		Report		Stadium: José Zorrilla

13 February 1949 20	Real Madrid	1–0	Sevilla CF	Madrid
		Report		Stadium: Nuevo Chamartín

20 February 1949 21	Español	3–2	Real Madrid	Barcelona
		Report		Stadium: Estadio Sarriá

27 February 1949 22	Real Madrid	0–2	Real Oviedo	Madrid
		Report		Stadium: Nuevo Chamartín

6 March 1949 23	Celta Vigo	3–1	Real Madrid	Vigo
		Report		Stadium: Estadio Balaídos

3 April 1949 24	Deportivo La Coruña	0–3	Real Madrid	La Coruña
		Report		Stadium: Estadio Riazor

10 April 1949 25	Real Madrid	3–1	Gimnàstic de Tarragona	Madrid
		Report		Stadium: Nuevo Chamartín

17 April 1949 26	CD Alcoyano	2–2	Real Madrid	Alcoy
		Report		Stadium: Estadio El Collao

=== Copa del Generalísimo ===
==== Round of 16 ====
21 April 1949	Real Madrid	2–2	Atletico de Bilbao	Madrid
		Report		Stadium: Nuevo Chamartín

24 April 1949	Atletico de Bilbao	1–1	Real Madrid	Bilbao
		Report		Stadium: San Mamés

27 April 1949	Atletico de Bilbao	3–1	Real Madrid	Barcelona
	Telmo Zarra 4'; Telmo Zarra 62'; Venancio 69'	Report	Olmedo 48'	Stadium: Camp de Les Corts; Referee: Azon Roma

== Statistics ==
=== Squad statistics ===
competition	points	total						GD
competition	points	G	V	N	P	Gf	Gs	GD
1948–49 La Liga	34	26	15	4	7	67	42	+25
1949 Copa del Generalísimo	–	3	0	2	1	4	6	−2
Total		42	36	6	10	113	55	+58

=== Players statistics ===
No.	Pos	Nat	Player	Total		1948–49 La Liga		1949 Copa del Generalísimo	
No.	Pos	Nat	Player	Apps	Goals	Apps	Goals	Apps	Goals
	GK	(Spain) ESP	José Bañón	22	-31	22	-31		
	DF	(Spain) ESP	Clemente Fernández	18	0	18	0		
	DF	(Spain) ESP	Azcarate	19	0	19	0		
	DF	(Spain) ESP	Guillermo Pont	14	0	14	0		
	MF	(Spain) ESP	Pablo Olmedo	24	15	24	15		
	MF	(Spain) ESP	Miguel Muñoz	22	5	22	5		
	MF	(Spain) ESP	Narro	20	0	20	0		
	MF	(Spain) ESP	Montalvo	17	9	17	9		
	FW	(Spain) ESP	Pahiño	26	21	26	21		
	FW	(Spain) ESP	Macala	23	3	23	3		
	FW	(Spain) ESP	Sabino Barinaga	16	4	16	4		
	GK	(Spain) ESP	Adauto	5	-11	5	-11		
	FW	(Spain) ESP	Arsuaga	15	5	15	5		
	MF	(Spain) ESP	Ipiña	14	0	14	0		
	DF	(Spain) ESP	José Mariscal	7	0	7	0		
	DF	(Spain) ESP	Javier Marcet	6	0	6	0		
	DF	(Spain) ESP	Vidal	5	0	5	0		
	GK	(Spain) ESP	Garcia Martin	0	0	0	0		
	DF	(Spain) ESP	Soto	5	0	5	0		
	MF	(Spain) ESP	Luis Molowny	5	4	5	4		
	DF	(Argentina) ARG	Navarro	3	0	3	0		
	MF	(Scotland) SCO	John Fox Watson	1	0	1	0		

- Source: http://www.bdfutbol.com/en/t/t1948-492.html
