= 1941–42 Real Madrid CF season =

39th season in existence of Real Madrid CF

Real Madrid Club de Futbol
1941–42 season
- President: Antonio Santos Peralba
- Manager: Juan Armet
- Stadium: Chamartín
- Primera Division: 2nd
- Copa del Generalísimo: Quarter-finals
- Top goalscorer: League: Alday (23); All: Alday (24)
Home colours	Away colours

The 1941–42 season was Real Madrid Club de Fútbol's 39th season in existence and the club's 10th consecutive season in the top flight of Spanish football.

== Summary ==
With superb performances of forward Manuel Alday, the club finished the league season as runners-up, seven points below champions Valencia CF. Surprisingly, the squad lost at home against Celta, which shattered its options of clinching the league title. In the Copa del Generalísimo, Madrid reached the quarter-finals, where they lost to Club Atlético de Bilbao in a playoff match after a 3–3 aggregate tie.

== Squad ==
Note: Flags indicate national team as defined under FIFA eligibility rules; some limited exceptions apply. Players may hold more than one non-FIFA nationality.

No.	Pos.	Nation	Player
—	GK	(Spain) ESP	Marzá
—	DF	(Spain) ESP	Mardones
—	DF	(Spain) ESP	Arzanegui
—	MF	(Spain) ESP	Antonio Alsúa
—	MF	(Spain) ESP	Ipiña
—	MF	(Spain) ESP	Félix Huete
—	MF	(Spain) ESP	Simón Lecue
—	MF	(Spain) ESP	Nazario Belmar
—	FW	(Cuba) CUB	Chus Alonso
—	FW	(Spain) ESP	Botella
—	FW	(Spain) ESP	Manuel Alday

No.	Pos.	Nation	Player
—	GK	(Spain) ESP	Pacheco
—	DF	(Spain) ESP	Olivares
—	FW	(Spain) ESP	Arbiza
—	DF	(Spain) ESP	Jacinto Quincoces
—	MF	(Mexico) MEX	Sauto
—	GK	(Spain) ESP	Esquiva
—	MF	(Spain) ESP	Leoncito
—	MF	(Spain) ESP	Tellado
—	FW	(Spain) ESP	Sabino Barinaga
—	FW	(Spain) ESP	Emilio
—	MF	(Spain) ESP	Moleiro
—	MF	(Spain) ESP	Rovira
—	FW	(Spain) ESP	Sanz
—	DF	(Spain) ESP	Clemente

=== Transfers ===
In
Pos.	Name	from	Type
GK	Marzá		
DF	Arzanegui	Baracaldo Oriamendi	
FW	Félix Huete	Real Murcia	
FW	Botella	Levante	
DF	Nazario Belmar	Hércules CF	
DF	Moleiro	Ferroviaria	
MF	Rovira	Español	

Out
Pos.	Name	To	Type
GK	Espinosa	Real Valladolid	
FW	Marin	Granada	
FW	Prat		

== Competitions ==
=== La Liga ===
==== Position by round ====
Round	1	2	3	4	5	6	7	8	9	10	11	12	13	14	15	16	17	18	19	20	21	22	23	24	25	26
Ground	A	H	A	H	A	H	A	H	A	H	A	A	H	H	A	H	A	H	A	H	A	H	A	H	H	A
Result	W	W	L	W	L	L	D	W	W	D	W	L	W	W	L	W	W	W	D	D	W	W	D	L	W	L
Position	5	3	5	4	6	8	8	7	6	6	4	4	4	4	4	4	3	3	3	3	3	2	3	3	2	2

Source: www.lfp.es
A = Away; H = Home; W = Win; D = Draw; L = Loss

==== League table ====
Pos	Team	Pld	W	D	L	GF	GA	GD	Pts
1	Valencia (C)	26	18	4	4	85	39	+46	40
2	Real Madrid	26	14	5	7	65	43	+22	33 (Note: Real Madrid finished ahead of Atlético Aviación on head-to-head goal difference: Real Madrid–Atlético Aviación 4–1, Atlético Aviación–Real Madrid 2–0.)
3	Atlético Aviación	26	14	5	7	50	44	+6	33
4	Deportivo La Coruña	26	12	4	10	36	37	−1	28 (Note: Deportivo La Coruña finished ahead of Celta on head-to-head goal difference: Deportivo–Celta 4–0, Celta–Deportivo 2–1.)
5	Celta	26	11	6	9	53	58	−5	28

Source: BDFútbol
Rules for classification: 1) points; 2) head-to-head points; 3) head-to-head goal difference; 4) goal difference; 5) number of goals scored.
(C) Champions

==== Matches ====
28 September 1941 1	Real Sociedad	2–3	Real Madrid	San Sebastián

5 October 1941 2	Real Madrid	5–2	Granada CF	Chamartín de la Rosa
				Stadium: Chamartín

12 October 1941 3	Atletico Bilbao	1–0	Real Madrid	Bilbao

19 October 1941 4	Real Madrid	4–3	FC Barcelona	Chamartín de la Rosa
				Stadium: Chamartín

26 October 1941 5	Deportivo La Coruña	1–0	Real Madrid	La Coruña

2 November 1941 6	Real Madrid	0–2	Sevilla CF	Chamartín de la Rosa
				Stadium: Chamartín

9 November 1941 7	Real Oviedo	2–2	Real Madrid	Oviedo

16 November 1941 8	Real Madrid	9–1	CD Castellón	Chamartín de la Rosa
				Stadium: Chamartín

23 November 1941 9	Alicante CD	1–2	Real Madrid	Alicante

30 November 1941 10	Real Madrid	1–1	Español	Chamartín de la Rosa
				Stadium: Chamartín

7 December 1941 11	Celta	2–4	Real Madrid	Vigo

14 December 1941 12	Atlético Aviación	2–0	Real Madrid	Madrid

21 December 1941 13	Real Madrid	5–3	Valencia CF	Chamartín de la Rosa
				Stadium: Chamartín

4 January 1942 14	Real Madrid	6–4	Real Sociedad	Chamartín de la Rosa
				Stadium: Chamartín

11 January 1942 15	Granada CF	3–1	Real Madrid	Granada

18 January 1942 16	Real Madrid	3–2	Atletico Bilbao	Chamartín de la Rosa
				Stadium: Chamartín

25 January 1942 17	FC Barcelona	0–2	Real Madrid	Barcelona

1 February 1942 18	Real Madrid	3–0	Deportivo La Coruña	Chamartín de la Rosa
				Stadium: Chamartín

8 February 1942 19	Sevilla CF	2–2	Real Madrid	Sevilla

15 February 1942 20	Real Madrid	1–1	Real Oviedo	Chamartín de la Rosa
				Stadium: Chamartín

24 February 1942 21	CD Castellón	0–3	Real Madrid	Castellón de la Plana

1 March 1942 22	Real Madrid	2–1	Alicante CD	Chamartín de la Rosa
				Stadium: Chamartín

8 March 1942 23	Español	0–0	Real Madrid	Barcelona

22 March 1942 24	Real Madrid	2–3	Celta	Chamartín de la Rosa
				Stadium: Chamartín

29 March 1942 25	Real Madrid	4–1	Atlético Aviación	Chamartín de la Rosa
				Stadium: Chamartín

5 April 1942 26	Valencia CF	3–1	Real Madrid	Valencia

== Statistics ==
=== Squad statistics ===
competition	points	total						GD
competition	points	G	V	N	P	Gf	Gs	GD
1941–42 La Liga	33	26	11	9	6	46	30	+16
1942 Copa del Generalísimo	–	3	0	2	1	4	6	−2
Total		42	36	6	10	113	55	+58

=== Players statistics ===
No.	Pos	Nat	Player	Total		1941–42 La Liga		1942 Copa del Generalísimo	
No.	Pos	Nat	Player	Apps	Goals	Apps	Goals	Apps	Goals
	GK	(Spain) ESP	Marzá	24	-31	16	-22	8	-9
	DF	(Spain) ESP	Mardones	29	1	23	1	6	0
	DF	(Spain) ESP	Arzanegui	17	0	12	0	5	0
	MF	(Spain) ESP	Antonio Alsúa	34	7	26	6	8	1
	MF	(Spain) ESP	Ipiña	34	0	26	0	8	0
	MF	(Spain) ESP	Félix Huete	23	0	21	0	2	0
	MF	(Spain) ESP	Simón Lecue	25	0	21	0	4	0
	MF	(Spain) ESP	Nazario Belmar	21	8	19	8	2	0
	FW	(Cuba) CUB	Chus Alonso	31	11	26	11	5	0
	FW	(Spain) ESP	Botella	31	6	25	5	6	1
	FW	(Spain) ESP	Manuel Alday	22	24	19	23	3	1
	GK	(Spain) ESP	Pacheco	5	-9	5	-9		
	DF	(Spain) ESP	Olivares	16	0	12	0	4	0
	FW	(Spain) ESP	Arbiza	17	18	11	9	6	9
	DF	(Spain) ESP	Jacinto Quincoces	5	0	5	0		
	MF	(Mexico) MEX	Sauto	11	0	5	0	6	0
	GK	(Spain) ESP	Esquiva	5	-12	5	-12		
	MF	(Spain) ESP	Leoncito	4	0	4	0		
	MF	(Spain) ESP	Tellado	2	0	2	0		
	FW	(Spain) ESP	Sabino Barinaga	2	0	2	0		
	FW	(Spain) ESP	Emilio	1	0	1	0		
	MF	(Spain) ESP	Moleiro	6	2	0	0	6	2
	MF	(Spain) ESP	Rovira	6	0	0	0	6	0
	FW	(Spain) ESP	Sanz	2	0	0	0	2	0
	DF	(Spain) ESP	Clemente	1	0	0	0	1	0
