= 1943 Copa del Generalísimo final =

Copa del Generalísimo 1943 final
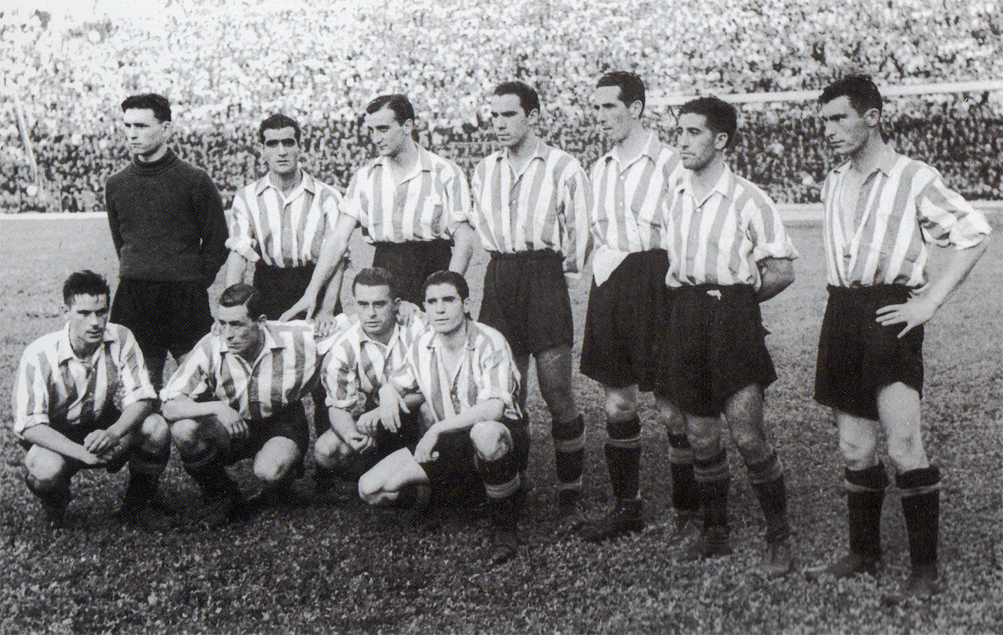
- Atletico Bilbao, champions
- Event: 1943 Copa del Generalísimo
Atlético de Bilbao	Real Madrid
1	0
- (a.e.t.)
- Date: 20 June 1943
- Venue: Estadio Metropolitano, Madrid
- Referee: Agustín Cruella
- Attendance: 50,000

The Copa del Generalísimo 1943 final was the 41st final of the King's Cup. The final was played at Estadio Metropolitano in Madrid, on 20 June 1943, being won by Club Atlético de Bilbao, who beat Real Madrid CF 1–0 after extra-time.

== Details ==
20 June 1943
19:00 CET

Atlético de Bilbao	1–0 (a.e.t.)	Real Madrid
Zarra 104'	Report1; Report2

Estadio Metropolitano, Madrid
Attendance: 50,000
Referee: (Catalonia) Agustín Cruella

Atlético Bilbao

Real Madrid

GK	(Spain) Raimundo Lezama
DF	(Spain) Juan José Mieza
DF	(Spain) Isaac Oceja (c)
MF	(Chile) Higinio Ortúzar
MF	(Spain) Antonio Ortiz
MF	(Spain) Nando
FW	(Spain) Hermenegildo Elices
FW	(Spain) José Luis Panizo
FW	(Spain) Telmo Zarra
FW	(Spain) Isidoro Urra
FW	(Spain) Agustín Gaínza
Manager:
(Spain) Juan Urquizu

GK	(Spain) Gonzalo Marzá
DF	(Spain) José María Querejeta
DF	(Spain) José Corona
MF	(Mexico) José Ramón Sauto
MF	(Spain) Juan Antonio Ipiña (c)
MF	(Spain) Moleiro
FW	(Spain) Antonio Alsúa
FW	(Spain) Chus Alonso
FW	(Spain) Pruden
FW	(Spain) Sabino Barinaga
FW	(Spain) Pascual Botella
Manager:
(Spain) Ramón Encinas

== See also ==
- El Viejo Clásico
