= 1946 Copa del Generalísimo final =

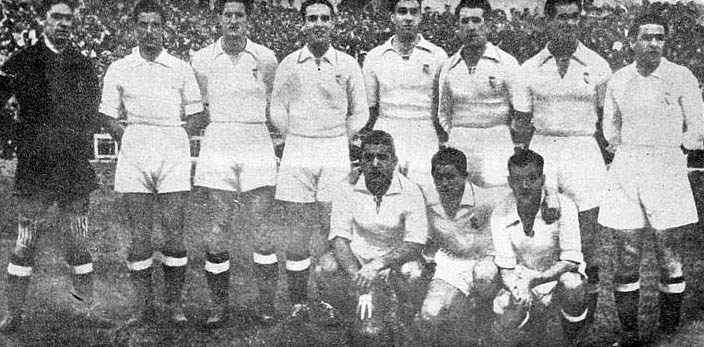
- Real Madrid, champions
- Event: 1946 Copa del Generalísimo
Real Madrid	Valencia
3	1
- Date: 9 June 1946
- Venue: Montjuïc, Barcelona
- Referee: José Martínez Íñiguez
- Attendance: 60,000

The 1946 Copa del Generalísimo final was the 44th final of the Copa del Rey. The final was played at the Montjuïc, Barcelona, on 9 June 1946, being won by Real Madrid CF, who beat Valencia CF 3–1.

== Details ==
9 June 1946
17:30 CET

Real Madrid	3–1	Valencia
Barinaga 2'; Pruden 40', 52'	Report	Gorostiza 81' (pen.)

Montjuïc, Barcelona
Attendance: 60,000
Referee: José Martínez Íñiguez

Real Madrid
Valencia

GK	1	(Spain) José Bañón
DF	2	(Spain) Clemente
DF	3	(Spain) José Corona
MF	4	(Spain) Moleiro
MF	5	(Spain) Juan Antonio Ipiña (c)
MF	6	(Spain) Félix Huete
FW	7	(Spain) Antonio Alsúa
FW	8	(Spain) Sabino Barinaga
FW	9	(Spain) Pruden
FW	10	(Spain) Nazario Belmar
FW	11	(Spain) Hermenegildo Elices
Manager:
(Spain) Jacinto Quincoces

GK	1	(Spain) Ignacio Eizaguirre
DF	2	(Spain) Álvaro
DF	3	(Spain) Juan Ramón (c)
MF	4	(Chile) Higinio Ortúzar
MF	5	(Spain) Carlos Iturraspe
MF	6	(Spain) Simón Lecue
FW	7	(Spain) Epi
FW	8	(Spain) Vicente Asensi
FW	9	(Spain) Mundo
FW	10	(Spain) Silvestre Igoa
FW	11	(Spain) Guillermo Gorostiza
Manager:
(Spain) Eduardo Cubells
