= Hermenegildo Elices =

Spanish footballer (1914–1964)

Personal information
- Full name: Hermenegildo Elices Rivas
- Date of birth: 13 April 1914
- Place of birth: Sestao, Spain
- Date of death: 7 March 1964 (aged 49)
- Place of death: Sestao, Spain
- Position: Forward

Senior career*
Years	Team	Apps	(Gls)
1932–1933	Leioa		
1933–1934	Sestao Sport Club	9	(3)
1934–1936	Athletic Bilbao	23	(7)
1938–1939	Alavés		
1939–1944	Athletic Bilbao	54	(19)
1944–1948	Madrid FC	28	(5)
- * Club domestic league appearances and goals

Hermenegildo Elices Rivas (13 April 1914 – 7 March 1964) was a Spanish footballer who played as a forward for Athletic Bilbao and Real Madrid.

He won back-to-back Copa del Rey titles with both clubs (1943 and 1944 with Athletic, alongside two league titles, and 1946 and 1947 with Madrid).

== Playing career ==
Elices was born in the Biscayan town of Sestao on 13 April 1914. After playing for SD Leioa and Sestao Sport Club, he joined Athletic Bilbao in 1934, with whom he made his debut in the First Division on 30 September. In his next two games in the First Division he scored doubles against Real Sociedad and Barcelona.

His stint there ended in 1936 due to the outbreak of the Spanish Civil War, during the last year of which he played at Deportivo Alavés before returning to Athletic in 1939 and staying there for another five seasons. In total, he played 116 official matches (79 in the League, 27 in the Copa del Rey, and 10 in the Regional Championship), scoring 38 goals. With Athletic, he won the League twice in 1935–36 and 1942–43 and two Cup titles in 1943 and 1944. He started in the 1943 cup final, which ended in a 1–0 victory over his future club Madrid, and he also played in the 1942 final, in which he scored in a 3–4 loss to Barcelona. Notably, on 27 April 1941, Elices netted a hat-trick against Athletic-Aviation (soon to be Atlético Madrid) to help his side to a 6–2 win in the 1941–47 FEF President Cup.

In 1944, 30-year-old Elices signed for Real Madrid, where he played his last four years as a professional. In total, he played 28 League and 11 Cup games for the Merengues, scoring seven goals, and won the Copa del Rey in 1946 and 1947, starting in the former final to help his side to a 3–1 victory over Valencia CF.

== Honours ==
Athletic Club

- La Liga: 1935–36, 1942–43
- Copa del Rey: 1943, 1944

Madrid FC

- Copa del Rey: 1946, 1947
