= Pau Vidal (footballer, born 1920) =

Spanish footballer (1920–2004)

Personal information
- Full name: Pablo Antonio Vidal Oliver
- Date of birth: 22 July 1920
- Place of birth: Palma, Mallorca, Spain
- Date of death: 25 December 2004 (aged 84)
- Position: Forward

Senior career*
| Years | Team | Apps | (Gls) |
| 1939–1944 | Mallorca | 5 | (4) |
| 1944–1949 | Real Madrid | 72 | (16) |
| 1949–1952 | Mallorca | 42 | (9) |

Managerial career
- 1952–1953: Espanya de Llucmajor
- 1954–1955: Mallorca
- * Club domestic league appearances and goals

Pablo Vidal Oliver (22 July 1920 – 25 December 2004) was a Spanish footballer who played for Mallorca and Real Madrid as a forward. He is considered one of the best left wingers in Spanish football in the 1940s.

== Early life ==
Born in Palma. He was the only son of Pau Vidal Sastre, a shoemaker by profession, and Catalina Oliver Mut. He began playing football with CE Llucmajor, but the Spanish Civil War (1936–1939) led him to complete military service in Menorca. After the war, he joined Mallorca.

== Career ==
In the 1939–40 season, Spanish football underwent a radical restructuring, placing Mallorca and Constància in a newly formed Segunda División, organized into geographical groups alongside Castellón, Levante, Sabadell, Girona, Granollers, and Badalona. Mallorca finished second to last and was relegated. During the 1943–44 season, Mallorca earned promotion back to Segunda División, with Vidal establishing himself as one of the team's key players in the left winger position. However, he subsequently signed for Real Madrid, making the jump to La Liga.

Vidal made his official debut for Real Madrid on 28 January 1945, and remained with the club for five seasons, from 1944–45 to 1948–49. During this period, he won two Copa del Rey titles, in 1946 and 1947. He missed the 1946 final at Montjuïc against Valencia due to injury, with Elices taking his place. He also had the honor of being in Real Madrid’s starting lineup for the inaugural match at the Nuevo Chamartín Stadium, later renamed the Santiago Bernabéu Stadium, on 14 December 1947.

In the 1949–50 season, Vidal returned to Mallorca after making 86 official appearances and scoring 19 goals for Real Madrid. His return coincided with a modest league campaign for Mallorca, but the team reached the quarter-finals of the Copa del Rey for the first time in its history. During the 1952–53 season, Vidal managed CE Espanya de Llucmajor. In June 1953, at the age of 33, he retired from professional football. He then took charge of Mallorca as head coach during a period of severe financial crisis, with the club back in the Tercera División. Vidal managed Mallorca throughout the 1954–55 season and part of 1955–56, before being replaced by Hungarian coach Esteban Platko.

== Career statistics ==
=== Club ===
Appearances and goals by club, season and competition
| Club | Season | League | | | Cup | | Other | | Total | |
| Club | Season | Division | Apps | Goals | Apps | Goals | Apps | Goals | Apps | Goals |
|---|---|---|---|---|---|---|---|---|---|---|
| Mallorca | 1939–40 | Segunda División | 5 | 4 | 0 | 0 | — | | 5 | 4 |
| Mallorca | 1941–42 | Primera Regional | ? | ? | — | | 7 (Note: Appearances in Promotion to remain in second division) | 3 | 7 | 3 |
| Mallorca | 1942–43 | Primera Regional | ? | ? | 0 | 0 | 7 | 6 | 7 | 6 |
| Mallorca | 1943–44 | Primera Regional | ? | ? | 0 | 0 | — | | 0 | 0 |
| Mallorca | Total | | 5 | 4 | 0 | 0 | 14 | 9 | 19 | 13 |
| Real Madrid | 1944–45 | La Liga | 14 | 7 | 3 | 1 | — | | 17 | 8 |
| Real Madrid | 1945–46 | La Liga | 21 | 4 | 0 | 0 | — | | 21 | 4 |
| Real Madrid | 1946–47 | La Liga | 17 | 2 | 6 | 2 | — | | 23 | 4 |
| Real Madrid | 1947–48 | La Liga | 15 | 3 | 4 | 0 | 0 | 0 | 19 | 3 |
| Real Madrid | 1948–49 | La Liga | 5 | 0 | 1 | 0 | — | | 6 | 0 |
| Real Madrid | Total | | 72 | 16 | 14 | 3 | 0 | 0 | 86 | 19 |
| Mallorca | 1949–50 | Segunda División | 18 | 6 | 3 | 2 | — | | 21 | 8 |
| Mallorca | 1950–51 | Segunda División | 23 | 3 | 0 | 0 | — | | 23 | 3 |
| Mallorca | 1951–52 | Segunda División | 1 | 0 | 0 | 0 | — | | 1 | 0 |
| Mallorca | Total | | 42 | 9 | 3 | 2 | — | | 45 | 11 |
| Career total | | | 119 | 29 | 17 | 5 | 14 | 9 | 150 | 43 |

== Honours ==
Real Madrid

- Copa del Rey: 1946, 1947
- Copa Eva Duarte: 1947
