= Ángel Arzanegui =

Spanish footballer (1917–1975)

Personal information
- Full name: Ángel Arzanegui Uribe
- Date of birth: 14 July 1917
- Place of birth: Guernica, Spain
- Date of death: 3 January 1975 (aged 57)
- Place of death: Spain
- Position: Defender

Senior career*
Years	Team	Apps	(Gls)
1940	Indauchu		
1940–1941	Barakaldo		
1941–1946	Real Madrid	41	(0)
1946–1950	Real Oviedo	47	(0)
1950–1951	Indauchu		
Total		88	(0)
- * Club domestic league appearances and goals

Ángel Arzanegui Uribe (14 July 1917 – 3 January 1975) was a Spanish footballer who played as a defender for Real Madrid and Real Oviedo in the 1940s, with whom he played a total of 88 La Liga matches.

== Playing career ==
Born on 14 July 1917 in Guernica, Biscay, Arzanegui began playing football with his friends at the Jesuit school of Indautxu. After the Spanish Civil War ended in 1939, some of the school's former students, including Arzanagui, decided to form a football team called SD Indauchu as a means to pass the time, since the post-war period was naturally lacking in means of entertainment.

In the summer of 1940, Arzanegui joined another Biscay-based club, Barakaldo, then in the Segunda División, and from there moved to Real Madrid in 1941. Two years later, in 1943, he inflicted a career-ending injury on Atlético Aviación's midfielder Manín. He remained with the club for five years, playing a total of 47 official matches, including 41 in La Liga and 6 in the Copa del Rey, and even though he failed to score a single goal, he helped Madrid win the 1946 Copa del Rey, although he did not play in the final.

On 28 September 1946, Arzanegui signed for Real Oviedo, then coached by Manuel Meana; he made his official debut for the team two weeks later, on 13 October 1946, in a league fixture against Celta de Vigo at the Balaídos, which ended in a 3–3 draw. He played with Oviedo for four years, until 1950, when he decided to retire, at the age of 33. In total, he played 88 matches in La Liga for both Madrid and Oviedo.

== Death ==
Arzanegui died on 3 January 1975, at the age of 57.

== Honours ==
Real Madrid

- Copa del Rey:
  - Champions (1): 1946
