= Manín =

Spanish footballer (1915–1987)

Personal information
- Full name: Aníbal Cabanzón Martínez
- Date of birth: 5 September 1915
- Place of birth: Santander, Cantabria, Spain
- Date of death: 13 May 1987 (aged 71)
- Place of death: Spain
- Position: Midfielder

Senior career*
Years	Team	Apps	(Gls)
1939–1940	Racing de Santander	3	(16)
1940–1943	Atlético Aviación	13	(39)
1943	Imperio		
Total		16	(55)
- * Club domestic league appearances and goals

Aníbal Cabanzón Martínez, better known as Manín (5 September 1915 – 13 May 1987), was a Spanish footballer who played as a midfielder for Racing de Santander and Atlético Madrid between 1939 and 1943.

== Playing career ==
Born on 5 September 1915 in Santander, Manín only began his football career after the end of the Spanish Civil War in 1939, aged 24, at his hometown club Racing de Santander, making his debut with the first team in a La Liga fixture against Hércules, which ended in a 3–1 loss. However, he only stayed there for a single season, scoring 3 goals in 16 La Liga matches.

Then, in 1940, Manín was signed by the reigning national champions Atlético Aviación (currently known as Atlético Madrid), replacing Luis Urquiri on the midfield, and then making his debut in a league fixture against Espanyol on 1 December, scoring a goal to help his side to a 5–3. He went on to score 4 goals in his first five matches with the club, all in December, including one against Real Madrid to help his side to a 1–4 win at the Chamartín, and a few months later, on 2 March 1941, he scored a goal in a 3–0 win over Real Oviedo, which mathematically secured the league title to Aviación for the second time in a row.

Manín also participated in the club's triumphant campaign at the 1941–47 FEF President Cup, the longest tournament in the history of Spanish football, playing in all of Aviación's five matches in April and May 1941, and even scoring the winner against Barcelona on 2 May; the club secured the title after winning the postponed match against Valencia six years later, in 1947. In June 1941, he started for Aviación in both legs of the final of the 1941 Copa Presidente Federación Castellana against Real Madrid, which ended in a 3–1 victory on aggregate.

Manín remained loyal to Aviación for three years, from 1940 until 1943, when he retired at the age of 28, due to an injury sustained in a collision with Real Madrid defender Ángel Arzanegui. In total, he scored 16 goals in 55 La Liga matches for Racing and Aviación.

== Later life ==
After retiring, Manín became director and owner of a paint factory called Pinturas Cabén, and later became one of Atlético's 50,000-member cooperatives. He was noted for his nervous and restless figure, a temperament that led him to success in both the sporting and the business world.

== Death ==
Manín died on 13 May 1987, at the age of 71.

== Honours ==
Club Aviación Nacional

- La Liga:
  - Champions (1): 1940–41
- Copa Presidente Federación Castellana
  - Champions (1): 1940–41
- FEF President Cup:
  - Champions (1): 1941–47
