= Castor Elzo =

Spanish footballer (1917–1989)

Personal information
- Full name: Castor Elzo Medina
- Date of birth: 7 November 1917
- Place of birth: Las Palmas, Spain
- Date of death: 14 September 1989 (aged 71)
- Place of death: Las Palmas, Spain
- Position: Midfielder

Senior career*
Years	Team	Apps	(Gls)
1933	Canalejas FC		
1933–1934	Gimnástico FC		
1934–1936	Marino FC		
1939–1940	Marino FC		
1940–1941	Real Zaragoza		
1941–1943	Castellón	34	(11)
1943–1944	Valencia	6	(2)
1944–1946	Real Madrid	11	(2)
1946–1948	Deportivo de La Coruña		
1948–1950	Málaga		
1950–1952	Las Palmas		
1952–1953	União Funchal de Madeira		
1953–1954	Aviación de Las Palmas		
Total		76	(21)
- * Club domestic league appearances and goals

Castor Elzo Medina (7 November 1917 – 14 September 1989) was a Spanish footballer who played as a midfielder in the Spanish first division with seven different clubs in the 1940s, including Valencia and Real Madrid, thus setting a record that he held for 47 years, until Miquel Soler equalled it.

== Career ==
=== First steps ===
Born in the Canary Islands town of Las Palmas on 7 November 1917, Elzo began playing football in the Valencia-based clubs Canalejas FC, Gimnástico FC, and Marino FC, joining the latter in 1934, aged 17.

After the Spanish Civil War, he played with Marino in the 1939–40 season, where he started playing as a left midfielder and ended up playing further back. Midway through that season, he signed for Real Zaragoza, with whom he won the Spanish Amateur Championship in 1941. He made his senior debut in a league fixture against Sevilla on 19 January 1940, aged 23, which ended in a 3–0 loss. After the Aragonese team was relegated to the Segunda División, he signed for Castellón, then in the top division, where he played 34 games and scored 11 goals in two seasons.

=== Valencia and Madrid ===
His good record caught the attention of the Valencia coaches, who decided to sign him in 1943 as a reinforcement for the midfield, and in his first (and only) season at the club, Valencia won the 1943–44 La Liga. However, Elzo played a minor role in this triumph, playing only 6 games and scoring twice, both in 3–0 victories, the first over Granada and the other against his future club Deportivo de la Coruña. He was one of the so-called calderones, the name given to the reinforcement troops that season who only played when they were required.

Elzo did not adapt to the Valencian team's game, mainly due to his habit of playing with his back to the goal, and thus, at the end of the season, he signed a contract with Real Madrid for 125,000 pesetas. In his two years at Madrid, he only scored two goals in 11 official matches, all in the league, thus not being a member of the Madrid squad that won the 1946 Copa del Generalísimo, after beating his former club Valencia 3–1 in the final.

=== Later career ===
In 1946, Elzo was brought to Deportivo de La Coruña by the hand of Hilario Marrero, a high-profile signing that could not prevent Deportivo from being relegated. In 1948, after two seasons in Galicia, he joined Málaga as one of the many reinforcements signed by coach Luis Urquiri, helping his side achieve promotion to La Liga in 1949. In 1950, he returned to his homeland to play for UD Las Palmas, helping his side achieve promotion to La Liga in 1951, but he left the club in 1952 after it was relegated to the Second Division. Before retiring, he played one season for both União Funchal de Madeira (1952–53) and Aviación de Las Palmas (1953–54). In total, he scored 21 goals in 76 La Liga matches.

When he joined Las Palmas in 1950, Elzo became the first footballer to play for both Real Madrid and Las Palmas, narrowly beating the likes of Juan Rodriguez Gallardo and Jean Luciano, who joined Las Palmas in 1951, after having already played in Madrid. Furthermore, he also held the record of having played in the First Division with seven different teams for 47 years, until Miguel Soler equaled it. Some other players have since matched it before it was finally broken by Carlos Aranda, who played for 8 top division clubs.

== Death ==
Elzo died in Las Palmas, Canary Islands, on 14 September 1989, at the age of 71.

== Honours ==
Real Zaragoza

- Spanish Amateur Championship:
  - Champions (1): 1940–41

Valencia FC

- La Liga:
  - Champions (1): 1943–44

== See also ==
- List of Real Madrid CF players
