= José María Querejeta =

Spanish footballer (1919–1989)

Personal information
- Full name: José María Querejeta Alberro
- Date of birth: 17 May 1919
- Place of birth: San Sebastián, Spain
- Date of death: 20 June 1989 (aged 70)
- Position: Defender

Senior career*
| Years | Team | Apps | (Gls) |
| 1934–1935 | Real Unión | | |
| 1938–1942 | Real Sociedad | | |
| 1942–1947 | Real Madrid | | |

International career
| 1947 | Spain | 2 | (0) |
- * Club domestic league appearances and goals

José María Querejeta Alberro (17 May 1919 – 20 June 1989) was a Spanish footballer who played as a defender for Real Sociedad and Real Madrid in the 1940s. He also played two matches for the Spanish national team in 1947.

== Club career ==
=== Real Unión and Real Sociedad ===
Born in San Sebastián on 17 May 1919, Querejeta began his football career in his hometown club Real Unión in 1934, aged 15, with whom he played 12 matches in the Gipuzkoa Championship.

During the Spanish Civil War, Querejeta joined Real Sociedad, with whom he played 12 matches in the 1938 Copa Brigadas de Navarra, a tournament organized by the Gipuzkoan Football Federation in honor of the Brigades of Navarre. After playing several matches in both the regional championship and the Copa del Rey in 1939, he finally made his league debut on 7 January 1940, in a 1–1 draw with his former club Real Unión. He stayed at Real Sociedad for four years, from 1938 until 1942, scoring a total of 4 goals, including one direct free kick, in 107 official matches, which ended in 49 wins, 14 draws, and 44 losses, helping his side achieve promotions to the top flight in 1941.

=== Real Madrid ===
In early 1943, Querejeta signed for Real Madrid, making his official debut on 14 March, in a La Liga fixture against the eventual champions Athletic Bilbao, helping his side to a 2–0 victory. Together with José Ramón Sauto, Chus Alonso, and Pruden, he was a member of the Madrid team that reached the 1943 Copa del Generalísimo final on 20 June, which ended in a 1–0 loss to Athletic. A week earlier, he started in the [[[Real Madrid v FC Barcelona (1943 Copa del Generalísimo)|infamous second leg of the semifinals]], in which he helped his side to a historic 11–1 trashing of Barcelona, the biggest win in the history of the El Clásico by either side. A few months later, on 8 December 1943, he started in the final of the 1943–44 Copa Presidente Federación Castellana, helping his side keep a clean-sheet in a 5–0 victory over Atlético.

Querejeta stayed at Madrid for five years, from 1942 until 1947, playing a total of 72 official matches and helping his side win two Copa del Rey titles in 1946 and 1947, although he did not play in either final. In total, he played in 80 La Liga matches for Real Sociedad and Real Madrid.

== International career ==
On 26 January 1947, the 27-year-old Querejeta made his international debut for Spain in a friendly against Portugal at Jamor, which ended in a 4–1 loss. Two months later, on 2 March, he earned his second (and last) cap for Spain in a friendly against Republic of Ireland in Dublin, which ended in a 3–2 loss. He and Curta "provided a masterclass in good defense", as they managed to prevent two of Ireland's best men, Tommy Eglington and Kevin O'Flanagan, from scoring.

== Later life ==
In 1952, Querejeta gave his testimony to El Libro de Oro del Real Madrid ("the Golden Book of Real Madrid"), which describes the first 50 years of the club through the words of its players, coaches, and presidents; despite not "personally knowing the ins and outs of other clubs", he stated that Madrid "is the best club in Spain, because when we meet others, whether in hotels, trips, international matches, comments on this matter are frequent", and also added that "If I were born again and became a footballer, if I had a place, I would like to be one again at Real Madrid".

== Death ==
Querejeta died on 20 June 1989, at the age of 70.

== Honours ==
Real Madrid CF

- Copa del Rey:
  - Champions (2): 1946 and 1947
  - Runner-up (1): 1943
- Copa Federación Centro:
  - Champions (1): 1943–44
