= John Fox Watson =

Scottish footballer

John Watson
Personal information
- Full name: John Fox Watson
- Date of birth: 31 December 1917
- Place of birth: Hamilton, Scotland
- Date of death: 15 April 1976 (aged 58)
- Place of death: Southend-on-Sea, England
- Height: 6 ft 0 in (1.83 m)
- Position: Centre half

Senior career*
| Years | Team | Apps | (Gls) |
- Douglas Water Thistle
| 1939–1946 | Bury | | |
| 1946–1948 | Fulham | 71 | (2) |
| 1948–1949 | Real Madrid | 1 | (0) |
| 1949–1951 | Crystal Palace | 61 | (1) |
| 1951–1952 | Canterbury City | | |
- * Club domestic league appearances and goals

John Fox Watson (31 December 1917 – 15 April 1976) was a Scottish football player, believed to be the only Scottish male player in Real Madrid's history.

== Biography ==
Watson was born in Hamilton during Hogmanay, at the end of 1917. Watson started his career at Douglas Water Thistle Juniors before signing with English side Bury for whom he made his Football League debut in February 1939, ahead of World War II. After the war, he played with Fulham until 1948.

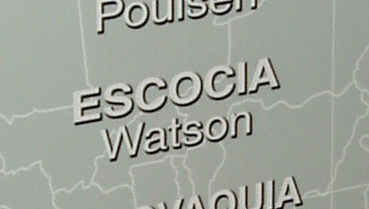
John Fox Watson on Real Madrid's wall of internationals

In 1948, Watson joined Englishman Mike Keeping, a fellow former Fulham player, at Spanish giants Real Madrid as a player. In his one season in Madrid, Watson played just one match, a 3–1 defeat away to Celta Vigo. He signed for the club during a period of unprecedented change; president Santiago Bernabéu Yeste had just been appointed, and Watson had come in just six months after the opening of the New Chamartin, later renamed the Estadio Santiago Bernabéu. He is believed to be the only Scottish male player to play for Real Madrid (Caroline Weir joined their women's team in 2022).

Watson returned to England in 1949 to join Crystal Palace, making 63 appearances in two seasons before joining non-league Canterbury City. He died on 15 April 1976, aged 58.
