= José Montalvo (footballer) =

Spanish footballer

Personal information
- Full name: José Antonio Julián Montalvo Barragán
- Date of birth: February 1, 1920
- Place of birth: Granja de Torrehermosa, Badajoz, Spain
- Date of death: November 14, 2002 (aged 82)
- Height: 1.68 m (5 ft 6 in)
- Position: Midfielder

Senior career*
Years	Team	Apps	(Gls)
1943–1944	Coria		
1944–1945	Betis	19	(7)
1945–1948	Mallorca	69	(32)
1948–1953	Real Madrid	72	(11)
1953–1954	Jaén	22	(6)
1954–1955	Levante	12	(4)
- * Club domestic league appearances and goals

José Antonio Julián Montalvo Barragán (1 February 1920 – 14 November 2002) was a Spanish footballer who played as a Midfielder.

Over the course of six seasons he amassed La Liga totals of 85 games and 14 goals, namely with Real Madrid.

== Career ==
Born in Badajoz, Extremadura. He began his career in regional leagues with Coria and achieved promotion with them to the Tercera División during the 1943–44 season, taking part in the team's first appearance in the Copa del Rey. In the following years, he played for Mallorca and then Real Betis in the Segunda División.

In Real Madrid, Montalvo made his La Liga debut on 26 September 1948, in a 4–4 draw against Valencia. He played with the first team for five seasons and scored 11 goals in La Liga, most notably a hat-trick against Sevilla in his first season. He was part of the team that won the 1947 Copa Eva Duarte against Valencia, which was played in 1948, at the beginning of his career with Real Madrid.

Won only Copa Eva Duarte with the Merengues and left the club in 1953, going on to represent until his retirement two years later Real Jaén and Levante.

== Honours ==
Real Madrid

- Copa Eva Duarte: 1947
