= José Luis Borbolla =

Mexican footballer (1920–2001)

Personal information
- Full name: José Luis Borbolla Chavira
- Date of birth: 31 January 1920
- Place of birth: Mexico City, Mexico
- Date of death: 11 February 2001 (aged 81)
- Place of death: Mexico City, Mexico
- Position: Midfielder

Senior career*
Years	Team	Apps	(Gls)
1940–1944	Marte		
1944–1945	Real Madrid	5	(1)
1945	→ Deportivo La Coruña (loan)	10	(4)
1945–1946	Asturias		
1946–1947	Celta Vigo	11	(3)
1947–1948	España		
1948–1949	Veracruz		
1949–1950	América		

International career
1950	Mexico	3	(0)
- * Club domestic league appearances and goals

José Luis Borbolla Chavira (31 January 1920 – 11 February 2001) was a Mexican footballer who played professionally in Liga MX and La Liga and represented Mexico at the 1950 FIFA World Cup. He was also the first Mexican to suit up for Real Madrid.

== Career ==
Born in Mexico City, Mexico, Borbolla played club football with local sides Asturias, España, and Marte, where he won the 1942–43 Mexican Primera División and Campeón de Campeones titles. In 1944, he moved to Europe to play with the Spanish clubs Deportivo La Coruña, Real Madrid (where he became the club's first Mexican player considering Jose Ramon Sauto who was born in Mexico never played as mexican in Spain neither played for the Mexico’s National Team) and Celta Vigo. Borbolla played for Real Madrid in the 1944–45 Copa del Generalísimo.

He returned to Mexico to join Veracruz. He later played for América, where he retired to become a coach for one season.

Borbolla made three international appearances for Mexico during 1950, including playing in the 1950 FIFA World Cup in the match against Switzerland.

After he retired from playing and coaching, Borbolla formed a successful manufacturing business that sold textile products in North and Central America.
