= Luis Molowny =

Spanish footballer and coach (1925–2010)

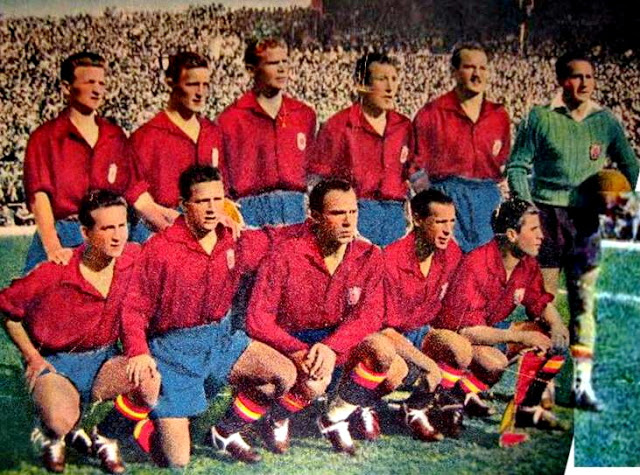
- Molowny (second from left, front row) with Spain in 1950

Personal information
- Full name: Luis Molowny Arbelo
- Date of birth: 12 May 1925
- Place of birth: Santa Cruz de Tenerife, Spain
- Date of death: 12 February 2010 (aged 84)
- Place of death: Las Palmas, Spain
- Height: 1.67 m (5 ft 6 in)
- Position: Midfielder

Youth career
- Vera
- 1942–1943: Santa Cruz

Senior career*
Years	Team	Apps	(Gls)
1943–1946	Marino		
1946–1957	Real Madrid	172	(90)
1957–1958	Las Palmas	3	(1)
Total		175	(91)

International career
1950–1955	Spain	7	(2)

Managerial career
- 1958: Las Palmas
- 1960: Las Palmas
- 1967–1970: Las Palmas
- 1969: Spain
- 1974: Real Madrid
- 1977–1979: Real Madrid
- 1982: Real Madrid
- 1985–1986: Real Madrid
- * Club domestic league appearances and goals

Luis Molowny Arbelo (12 May 1925 – 12 February 2010) was a Spanish football player and coach.

A midfielder, he amassed La Liga totals of 175 matches and 91 goals over 12 seasons, with Real Madrid and Las Palmas. He went on to work as a manager with the two clubs, winning 14 major titles with the former both capacities combined.

Molowny represented Spain at the 1950 World Cup. For a brief period in the late 1960s, he also coached the national team.

== Club career ==
Molowny was born in Santa Cruz de Tenerife, Canary Islands; his surname originated from County Clare in Ireland, being most often spelt Maloney in later years. He trialled for CD Tenerife as a youngster, but was not allowed to play in the scouting match. He positioned himself behind one of the goals in order to act as a ball boy and retrieve lost balls and return them, and after a display of skills he was signed by Santa Cruz CF but, not being 18 at the time, he was limited to appear in friendly games.

In 1946, after winning the Canarian regional championships with Marino FC, Molowny caught the eye of both FC Barcelona and Real Madrid. The former club sent an emissary by boat to sign him, and the latter's president, Santiago Bernabéu, upon reading the developments in La Vanguardia whilst he was travelling to Reus, telephoned to director Jacinto Quincoces and ordered that the player be signed; after he performed poorly in a match where he was due to showcase his talent, Bernabéu was still adamant, and a deal was eventually closed for 250.000 pesetas and a 3.000 monthly salary.

Molowny made his debut for his new team on 1 December 1946, scoring through a 79th-minute header in a 2–1 La Liga home win against Barcelona. He finished his first season with a further ten goals in 15 appearances, winning the Copa del Generalísimo.

During his 11-year stint in Madrid, Molowny appeared in 208 games in all competitions, scoring 104 times. He claimed five titles with his main club, including two national championships and the 1955–56 edition of the European Cup, even though he did not take part in the final of the latter tournament itself.

== International career ==
Molowny earned seven caps for Spain in five years. His first came on 2 April 1950, and he contributed with one of his two international goals to a 5–1 win over Portugal for the 1950 FIFA World Cup qualifiers, at the Nuevo Chamartín.

Selected by manager Guillermo Eizaguirre for the finals in Brazil, Molowny appeared in the 2–2 second group stage draw against Uruguay, helping to a final fourth place.

== Coaching career ==
Molowny retired in January 1958 at the age of 32, and immediately started coaching UD Las Palmas where he had last played. Over the following seasons he often acted as interim manager, not being able to prevent top-flight relegation in 1960; in the 1968–69 campaign, already as a full-time coach, he led the team to a best-ever runner-up finish only behind champions Real Madrid.

From March to June 1969, Molowny was in charge of the Spanish senior side whom he coached for four games. During his tenure, he won twice, drew once and lost to Finland.

Late into 1973–74 Molowny, who was working with Real Madrid in directorial capacities (where he remained until 1990), replaced Miguel Muñoz at the helm of the first team. He won the domestic cup that year, and successively took the place of Miljan Miljanić, Vujadin Boškov and Amancio Amaro after they were fired, being crowned champion in 1978 and 1979; additionally, he was on the bench as the Merengues won consecutive UEFA Cups in 1984–85 and 1985–86.

== Death ==
After quitting football altogether, Molowny settled in his native region. He died on 12 February 2010 at the age of 84, in Las Palmas.

== In film ==
Molowny played himself in three Spanish films: Eleven Pairs of Boots (1954), Radio Stories (1955) and Blond Arrow (1956, a biopic about Alfredo Di Stéfano).

== Honours ==
=== Player ===
Real Madrid

- La Liga: 1953–54, 1954–55
- Copa del Generalísimo: 1947
- Copa Eva Duarte: 1947
- European Cup: 1955–56
- Latin Cup: 1955

=== Manager ===
Real Madrid

- La Liga: 1977–78, 1978–79, 1985–86
- Copa del Rey: 1973–74, 1981–82
- Copa de la Liga: 1985
- UEFA Cup: 1984–85, 1985–86

Individual

- Don Balón Award (La Liga Coach of the Year): 1977–78, 1978–79, 1979–80

== See also ==
- List of UEFA Cup winning managers
