= Baltasar Albéniz =

Spanish footballer and manager (1905–1978)

Personal information
- Date of birth: 6 January 1905
- Place of birth: Eibar, Spain
- Date of death: 29 November 1978 (aged 73)
- Place of death: Pamplona, Spain
- Position: Defender

Senior career*
Years	Team	Apps	(Gls)
1930–1931	Alavés	18	(8)
1931–1932	Real Sociedad	5	(2)
1932–1934	Alavés	33	(4)
1935–1936	Arenas Club de Getxo		

Managerial career
- 1935–1936: Arenas Club de Getxo
- 1939: Alavés
- 1941–1944: Celta Vigo
- 1944–1946: Espanyol
- 1946–1947: Real Madrid
- 1947–1948: Alavés
- 1950–1951: Real Madrid
- 1955–1957: Osasuna
- 1957–1958: Athletic Bilbao
- 1958–1959: Las Palmas
- 1959–1960: Celta Vigo
- 1960–1962: Real Sociedad
- 1963: Osasuna
- 1971–1972: Osasuna
- 1972–1973: Tudelano
- Atlético Tetuán
- Indautxu
- * Club domestic league appearances and goals

Baltasar Albéniz (6 January 1905 in Eibar – 29 November 1978 in Pamplona) was a Spanish football manager. He coached Real Madrid twice (1946–1947 and 1950–1951), winning the 1950–51 Copa del Rey. He later defeated Real Madrid in the 1957–58 Copa final as the head coach of Athletic Bilbao. He also coached RCD Espanyol, CA Osasuna, and Real Sociedad.
