= Guillermo Pont =

Spanish footballer

Guillermo Pont Serra (December 1, 1921 - October 27, 2000) was a Spanish professional association football player who played as a defender.

== Clubs ==
He played the most of his career for Spanish football giants Real Madrid C.F. He started 87 matches in La Liga for Real, and 8 matches in other competitions.

| Club | Country | Period | Number of matches |
|---|---|---|---|
| Real Madrid C.F. | Spain | 1946–1952 | 95 |
| CD Málaga | Spain | 1952–1953 | 6 |

== Honours ==
Real Madrid

- Copa del Generalísimo: 1947
- Copa Eva Duarte: 1947
