= Antonio Alsúa =

Spanish footballer (1919–1998)

Personal information
- Full name: Antonio Alsúa Alonso
- Date of birth: 25 October 1919
- Place of birth: Irun, Gipuzkoa, Spain
- Date of death: 4 March 1998 (aged 78)
- Position: Midfielder

Senior career*
Years	Team	Apps	(Gls)
1939–1941	Real Unión		
1941–1948	Real Madrid	134	(35)
1948–1950	Gimnàstic	37	(12)
1950–1951	Lleida	13	(3)
1951–1953	Alavés	39	(11)
Total		223+	(61+)

Managerial career
- 1952–1953: Alavés
- * Club domestic league appearances and goals

Antonio Alsúa Alonso (25 October 1919 – 4 March 1998) was a Spanish professional footballer, who played as a midfielder.

He became one of the most important players for Real Madrid CF in the 1940s, playing over 170 matches for the Spanish side and winning the Copa del Rey in 1946 and 1947.

He was the elder brother of Rafael Alsúa, who also played for Real Madrid but had longer spells with Real Sociedad and Racing Santander.

== Honours ==
Real Madrid

- Copa del Generalísimo: 1946, 1947
- Copa Eva Duarte: 1947
