= Nazario Belmar =

Spanish footballer and film producer

- Born: Nazario Belmar Martínez; 25 October 1919; Elda, Spain
- Died: 9 July 1980 (aged 60); Madrid, Spain
- Occupations: Footballer, film producer

Nazario Belmar Martínez (25 October 1919 – 9 July 1980) was a Spanish footballer and film producer.

== Early life and education ==
Nazario Belmar Martínez was born on 25 October 1919 in Elda, Spain.

== Career ==
=== Football ===
A midfielder, Belmar began playing at CD Eldense before the Spanish Civil War and, after, at Hércules CF. He signed with Real Madrid CF when he was 19, in July 1941.

In a match with Real Betis in the 1946–47 season, he was seriously injured and he had to announce his retirement.

=== Film ===
In 1957 Belmar established Naga Films with Marcelino Galatas Rentería, making films as El verdugo with Rafael Azcona and Luis García Berlanga.

In 1964, he left Naga Films to establish Belmar PC, filming Pedro Lazaga's Un vampiro para dos. In 1965, he abandoned his filmmaking career.

== Death ==
Belmar died on 9 July 1980 in Madrid.

== Football career statistics ==
Appearances and goals by club, season and competition
Club	Season	League		Cup		Total	
Club	Season	Apps	Goals	Apps	Goals	Apps	Goals
Hércules	1940–41	0	0	3	0	3	0
Hércules	1940–41	12	3	1	1	13	4
Hércules	Total	12	3	4	1	16	4
Real Madrid	1941–42	19	8	2	0	21	8
Real Madrid	1942–43	18	5	5	3	23	8
Real Madrid	1943–44	6	2	3	0	9	2
Real Madrid	Total	43	15	10	3	53	18
Sabadell	1944–45	13	1	0	0	13	1
Real Madrid	1945–46	16	6	5	1	21	7
Real Madrid	1946–47	17	2	1	0	18	2
Real Madrid	Total	33	8	6	1	39	9
Career total		101	27	20	5	121	32

== Filmography ==
- La muerte silba un blues (1964)
- The Executioner (1963)
- La becerrada (1963)
- Aprendiendo a morir (1962)
- Sabían demasiado (1962)
