= Pepe Corona =

Spanish footballer (1918–2011)

Personal information
- Full name: José Llopis Corona
- Date of birth: 4 June 1918
- Place of birth: Alicante, Spain
- Date of death: 29 January 2011 (aged 92)
- Place of death: Alicante, Spain
- Position: Left-back

Youth career
- Iberia
- Gimnástico Carolinas

Senior career*
Years	Team	Apps	(Gls)
1935–1939	Gimnástico Carolinas		
1939–1941	Alicante		
1941–1943	Hércules	17	(4)
1943–1948	Real Madrid	116	(7)
1948–1949	Gimnàstic	17	(3)
1949–1950	Mallorca		
1950–1951	Gandía		

Managerial career
- Villajoyosa
- Monóvar
- Jijona
- Calpe
- * Club domestic league appearances and goals

José 'Pepe' Llopis Corona (4 June 1918 – 29 January 2011) was a Spanish footballer who played as a left-back.

Over the course of seven seasons he amassed La Liga totals of 150 games and 14 goals, namely with Real Madrid.

== Career ==
Born in Alicante, Valencian Community, Corona made his La Liga debuts with local Hércules CF, being relegated in his first year as a professional. In 1943 he signed with Real Madrid, going on to remain in the Spanish capital for five seasons, where he appeared in a total of 143 official games; a renowned tough defender, he was also a penalty kick specialist.

Corona, the last survivor of the inaugural match at the Nuevo Chamartín on 14 December 1947, against C.F. Os Belenenses, won two Spanish Cups with the Merengues and left the club in 1948, going on to represent until his retirement three years later Gimnàstic de Tarragona (in the top level), RCD Mallorca and CF Gandía.

== Death ==
Corona died on 29 January 2011, in his hometown of Alicante. He was 92 years old.

== Honours ==
Real Madrid

- Copa del Generalísimo: 1946, 1947
- Copa Eva Duarte: 1947
