= José Bañón =

Spanish footballer and coach

Personal information
- Full name: José Bañón Gonzálvez
- Date of birth: 19 April 1922
- Place of birth: Alicante, Spain
- Date of death: 21 April 1987 (aged 65)
- Place of death: Alicante, Spain
- Position: Goalkeeper

Youth career
- Machet Carolinas
- Trafalgar
- Gimnástico Carolinas
- Benalúa

Senior career*
Years	Team	Apps	(Gls)
1941	Hércules	0	(0)
1941–1943	Elche		
1943–1950	Real Madrid	132	(0)
1950–1951	Alicante		

International career
1947	Spain	1	(0)

Managerial career
- 1951–1953: Alicante
- Orihuela
- Elche
- * Club domestic league appearances and goals

José Bañón Gonzálvez (19 April 1922 – 21 April 1987) was a Spanish football goalkeeper and coach.

== Club career ==
Bañón was born in Alicante. After playing for three local amateur clubs he joined another team in the Valencian Community, Hércules CF, being part of their La Liga roster in 1941–42 but failing to make his debut in the competition.

Bañón signed for Real Madrid in the summer of 1943, being the most used player in his position during his six-season spell (maximum of 26 matches in 1944–45 and a minimum of 17 in 1947–48) and winning three major titles, including two Copa del Generalísimo trophies. He was forced to retire from football at only 27, due to a lung problem.

After retiring, Bañón returned to his native region and coached Alicante CF from 1951 to 1953, the first year being spent in Segunda División and the second as a player-coach. He was also in charge of Orihuela Deportiva CF and Elche CF, leaving the sport for good in 1956.

== International career ==
Bañón was called up several times to the Spain national side as Ignacio Eizaguirre's backup, but only earned one cap: on 27 January 1947, he played 48 minutes in a friendly with Portugal before retiring injured in the eventual 1–4 loss in Lisbon.

== Personal life / Death ==
Bañón's older brother, Francisco (1920–2009), was an international football referee. José died in his hometown of Alicante on 21 April 1987, just two days after his 65th birthday.

== Honours ==
=== Club ===
Real Madrid

- Copa del Generalísimo: 1946, 1947
- Copa Eva Duarte: 1947

=== Individual ===
- Ricardo Zamora Trophy: 1945–46
