= Sabino Barinaga =

Spanish footballer and manager

- Barinaga sometime in the 1940s

Personal information
- Full name: Sabino Barinaga Alberdi
- Date of birth: 15 August 1922
- Place of birth: Durango, Spain
- Date of death: 19 March 1988 (aged 65)
- Place of death: Madrid, Spain
- Height: 1.80 m (5 ft 11 in)
- Position: Forward

Youth career
- 1936–1938: Southampton

Senior career*
Years	Team	Apps	(Gls)
1938–1939	Southampton	0	(0)
1939–1950	Real Madrid	149	(69)
1941–1943	→ Valladolid (loan)	13	(4)
1950–1954	Real Sociedad	56	(22)
1954–1955	Betis	21	(6)
Total		239	(101)

Managerial career
- 1955: Betis
- 1957–1959: Osasuna
- 1959–1960: Betis
- 1960–1961: Oviedo
- 1961–1963: Málaga
- 1963–1964: Atlético Madrid
- 1965–1966: Valencia
- 1966: Sevilla
- 1968: Betis
- 1968: Club América
- 1968–1969: Nigeria
- 1969–1970: Mallorca
- 1970–1971: ASFAR
- 1971–1972: Morocco
- 1973–1974: ASFAR
- 1973–1974: Oviedo
- 1974–1975: Cádiz
- 1978: Oviedo
- 1980–1982: ASFAR
- * Club domestic league appearances and goals

Sabino Barinaga Alberdi (15 August 1922 – 19 March 1988) was a Spanish football forward and manager.

He appeared in 205 La Liga matches and scored 91 goals over 13 seasons, almost exclusively for Real Madrid. He later embarked on a managerial career, which lasted nearly 25 years.

== Playing career ==
Born in Durango, Biscay, Barinaga moved to England in his teens at the start of the Spanish Civil War, accompanied by two of his three siblings. Some of the other refugees who made the same journey in 1937 also became footballers, including Emilio Aldecoa, José Gallego and Raimundo Lezama; whilst playing for his local high school he was discovered by Southampton and went on to spend one season with its reserve team, scoring 62 goals.

Returning to his country at the end of the conflict and as another begun, Barinaga rejected an offer from Basque giants Athletic Bilbao, moving to Real Madrid instead. An inside forward on the right flank, he made his La Liga debut on 28 April 1940 in a 1–3 away loss against Athletic, his only appearance of the season.

From 1943 to 1945, after nearly two years on loan in Segunda División with Real Valladolid, Barinaga scored 38 league goals in 48 games, but the Merengues won no silverware in the period. He netted the first ever goal at the Santiago Bernabéu Stadium, in a 3–1 win over Portugal's C.F. Os Belenenses on 14 December 1947, and won three major trophies during his nine-year spell at the club, notably two Copa del Generalísimo, with the player scoring in the 1946 final against Valencia CF (3–1); on 13 June 1943, he contributed with four in only 13 minutes as Real trounced FC Barcelona 11–1 at home in the domestic cup semi-finals, following a 0–3 loss at Camp de Les Corts.

Barinaga left Real Madrid in 1950 as a free agent – having appeared in his final season mostly as a central defender– then played a further three top level seasons with Real Sociedad in his native region. In the summer of 1954, at his own request, he was released and joined Real Betis where he retired as a player.

== Coaching career ==
Barinaga started coaching precisely with his last club. For the 1957–58 campaign he moved to the top division with CA Osasuna, remaining in that tier for most of the following decade. In 1962 he also led CD Málaga to promotion from division two, only to be relegated back, a fate which also befell him with in Betis in 1968 and RCD Mallorca in 1970.

Abroad, Barinaga worked for a few months with Club América in Mexico, later managing the national teams of Nigeria and Morocco. His last job was with Real Oviedo – which he had already coached in the top flight a few years before – not being able to prevent relegation from the second division in 1978.

== Death ==
Barinaga died on 19 March 1988 in Madrid at the age of 65, from a heart disease. He was interred at the cemetery of Almudena in the city.

== Honours ==
=== Player ===
Real Madrid

- Copa del Generalísimo: 1946, 1947
- Copa Eva Duarte: 1947
