= Clemente Fernández =

Spanish footballer

Clemente
Personal information
- Full name: Clemente Fernández López
- Date of birth: 23 November 1919
- Place of birth: Madrid, Spain
- Date of death: 17 July 1996 (aged 76)
- Place of death: Madrid, Spain
- Position: Right back

Senior career*
Years	Team	Apps	(Gls)
1939–1940	Betis San Isidro		
1940–1942	Deportivo Castilla		
1942–1952	Real Madrid	109	(0)
1943–1944	→ Hércules (loan)	25	(0)
1952–1953	Deportivo La Coruña	10	(0)

International career
1948–1949	Spain	3	(0)
- * Club domestic league appearances and goals

Clemente Fernández López (23 November 1919 – 17 July 1996), known simply as Clemente, was a Spanish professional footballer who played as a right back.

== Club career ==
Having begun his career as a midfielder, Clemente joined hometown club Real Madrid in 1942 from local amateurs CD Deportivo Castilla, playing in only four La Liga games in his first season. After one year on loan at Hércules CF he returned to the Merengues, but appeared in just seven league matches during the campaign.

Of the following seven seasons, Clemente managed to be regularly played in four of them, winning three major titles including two Copa del Rey trophies. In 1952, after 144 official games with Real Madrid, he signed for fellow league side Deportivo de La Coruña, retiring at the end of the campaign at the age of 33.

== International career ==
Clemente earned three caps for Spain, in slightly less than one year. His debut came on 21 March 1948 in a 2–0 friendly win with Portugal, in Madrid.

== Honours ==
Real Madrid

- Copa del Generalísimo: 1946, 1947
- Copa Eva Duarte: 1946
