= Pruden =

Spanish footballer

Personal information
- Full name: Prudencio Sánchez Fernández
- Date of birth: September 1, 1916
- Place of birth: Babilafuente, Kingdom of Spain
- Date of death: February 25, 1998 (aged 81)
- Position: Forward

Youth career
- Salamanca

Senior career*
| Years | Team | Apps | (Gls) |
| 1939–1940 | Salamanca | 13 | (3) |
| 1940–1941 | Atlético Aviación | 22 | (33) |
| 1941–1943 | Salamanca | 28 | (27) |
| 1943–1948 | Real Madrid | 81 | (58) |
| 1948–1949 | Real Zaragoza | | |
| 1949–1950 | Plus Ultra | 23 | (17) |
- * Club domestic league appearances and goals

Prudencio Sánchez Fernández, commonly known as Pruden (1 September 1916 – 25 February 1998) was a Spanish footballer who played as a forward for Atlético Madrid (then known as Atlético Aviación) and Real Madrid. He was La Liga's top scorer in 1940–41 with Atlético, in which he was the architect of the entity's second league title that same year. At Real Madrid, he played a pivotal role in helping the club win two consecutive Copa del Reys as he scored important goals in both finals.

== Playing career ==
=== Early years ===
Prudencio Sánchez was born on 1 September 1916 in the town of Babilafuente, in the province of Salamanca. His career started in his hometown club Salamanca, in the club's first-ever season in 1934–35, aged 18. In the following season, Pruden helped the club achieve promotion to Segunda División, the second tier in Spain, before the outbreak of the Spanish Civil War in 1936. When the conflict ended in 1939, he stayed at Salamanca for one more season until he received a proposal from Atlético Aviación in 1940. In the rehearsal he convinced the coaching staff and the managers and a month later the agreement for his signing was closed.

=== Atlético Aviación ===
In 1940, Pruden joined Atlético Aviación, which was the reigning Spanish champions, and as the league winners, they contested the 1940 Spanish Super Cup against the Copa del Rey winners, RCD Espanyol, in a two-legged game in September. Pruden did not play in the first leg, which ended in a 3–3 draw, but he then made his debut in the second leg, scoring a hat-trick to help Atlético Aviación to a 7–1 victory (10–4 on aggregate). It was at Atlético Aviación, under coach Ricardo Zamora, that Pruden began to stand out as a great goal scorer, winning the Pichichi Trophy after scoring 33 league goals in just 22 matches, a tally never reached by any other footballer at the time as he broke Isidro Lángara's previous record by two goals. He was thus a crucial player in helping the club win the 1940–41 La Liga title (the club's second). During that season, Pruden scored goals in eight consecutive league matches (a total of 14 goals) establishing a club record that was not equaled until 2009 by Diego Forlán.

After his goalscoring success, Pruden, who was an amateur, wanted a professional record, and thus he asked the rojiblanca board for a professional file, but Atlético was reluctant as he had not yet fully recovered from a fibula fracture that he had suffered. The talks did not come to fruition and financial disagreements made him decide to return to his hometown, Salamanca, and signed with his youth club UD Salamanca, then in the Second Division, in exchange for 50,000 pesetas. At Salamanca, he took the opportunity to continue his medical studies that he had left halfway through after he had left to go to Madrid a year earlier, thus combining football with his studies. The first rumors about his signing for Madrid arose after participating in the tribute to Jacinto Quincoces. He played several friendlies with the whites while trying to keep Salamanca in the second tier of Spanish football. After failing to lead the club to promotion, Pruden left in 1943 and signed for Real Madrid, a club where he spent 5 years, playing until 1948.

=== Real Madrid ===
Pruden made his debut for Madrid in the first round of the 1943 Copa del Generalísimo precisely against his former team Salamanca, and he scored a brace as they won 5–1. In the subsequent rounds, Real Madrid defeated RCD Español, Xerez and Barcelona with the historic 0-1 victory, in which Pruden scored a hat-trick in the second leg of the semi-finals to help Madrid achieve the biggest win in the history of the El Clásico by either side, and reaching the final which they would lose to Athletic Bilbao.

During his stint in the capital, he failed to win the league title, although he did win two consecutive Copa del Reys, in 1946 and 1947, and scored in both finals, with a brace in a 3–1 win over Valencia, and a last-minute goal to seal a 2–0 extra-time win over Espanyol. His last season at the capital in 1947–48 was also his worst one, because after scoring a goal on the first matchday against Alcoyano, Pruden then went 25 games in a row without doing so. However, in his final match for the club, he saved his team from relegation with a brace on the last matchday against Real Oviedo.

As a striker at Madrid, Pruden scored seven hat-tricks for a total of 87 goals, one behind the club's all-time top scorer at the time, Luis Regueiro from Irunda with 88.

=== Later years ===
After leaving the capital, he played one season with Real Zaragoza, in the Tercera División, then the 3rd tier, and then ended his career in 1950, at the age of 34, in the Plus Ultra Sports Association, which years later officially became the Real Madrid subsidiary, although it complied with said functions already at the time.

He was unable to earn a single cap for Spain because of the great competition that there was for the position of center forward, where mainly Mundo and Telmo Zarra blocked his way.

== Style of play ==
"Pruden was a player of great opportunism and efficiency, with a good shot with both legs and a powerful header. He liked to go to the clash in each play and always bothered the rival defenders due to his strength and vigor." He was not a technical prodigy and his style was not very aesthetic, which is why he always looked for the opposite goal without ornaments or fancy moves.

== After football ==
After hanging up his boots, Pruden continued to practice medicine, and in 1953 he entered the medical services of Real Madrid. He combined it for a few years with the position of delegate and later worked as a company doctor until his retirement.

In 1958, the president of UD Salamanca and his former teammate Dámaso Sánchez de Vega gave him the club's highest distinction in tribute to all the years he wore the Salamanca shirt.

== Death ==
Pruden died on 25 February 1998, at the age of 81.

== Honours ==
Atlético Aviación

- La Liga:
  - Winners (1): 1940–41.
- Spanish Super Cup
  - Winners (1): 1940.

Real Madrid

- Copa del Rey:
  - Winners (2): 1946 and 1947
- Copa Eva Duarte:
  - Winners (1): 1947.
