= Chus Alonso =

Spanish footballer

Personal information
- Full name: Jesús Alonso Fernández
- Date of birth: April 24, 1917
- Place of birth: Havana, Cuba
- Date of death: August 9, 1979 (aged 62)
- Place of death: Madrid, Spain
- Position: Midfielder

Senior career*
Years	Team	Apps	(Gls)
1934–1935	Real Club Deportivo Oviedo		
1935	Real Oviedo	3	(2)
1935–1936	Real Madrid C.F. (amateur)		
1935–1936	Real Valladolid (loan)		
1936–1948	Real Madrid C.F.	159	(65)
1948–1950	Real Zaragoza	28	(7)

International career
1942	Spain	3	(0)
- * Club domestic league appearances and goals

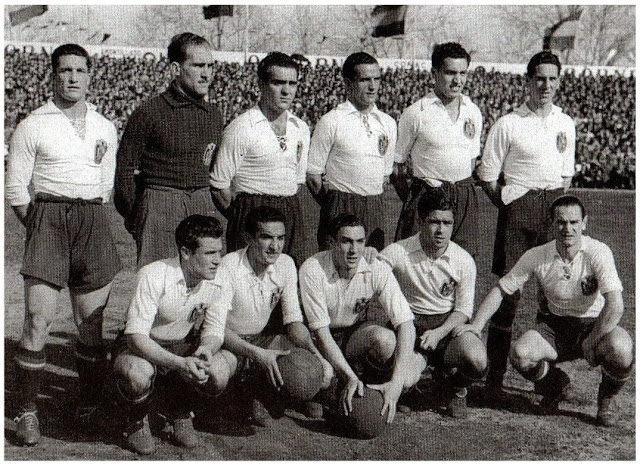
Chus Alonso and his team in 1942

Jesús "Chus" Alonso Fernández (April 24, 1917, in Havana – August 9, 1979, in Madrid), was a Spanish association football player. He played as a midfielder.

== Club career ==
Alonso's family returned to Spain when he was a child, and played exclusively for Spanish clubs. He scored 2 goals in the inaugural game at the Santiago Bernabéu Stadium, and scored the first goal in competitive game in the new stadium against Athletic Bilbao.

== International career ==
Chus Alonso was born in Cuba to Spanish parents. At birth he was naturalized Spanish, and he played 3 matches for Spain national football team, held with France, Germany and Italy.

== Titles ==
Alsonso played 121 matches in La Liga for Real Madrid and scored 56 goals. He also played 39 matches in the Copa del Generalísimo, scoring 12 goals. His trophy collection includes two Spanish Cups and a Copa Eva Duarte.

== See also ==
- List of Spain international footballers born outside Spain
