= Juan Antonio Ipiña =

Spanish footballer and manager

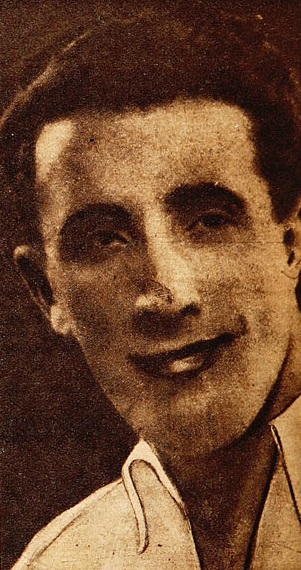

Personal information
- Full name: Juan Antonio Ipiña Iza
- Date of birth: 23 August 1912
- Place of birth: Ortuella, Spain
- Date of death: 7 September 1974 (aged 62)
- Place of death: Bilbao, Spain
- Position: Midfielder

Senior career*
Years	Team	Apps	(Gls)
1932–1933	Erandio		
1933–1935	Real Sociedad	36	(7)
1935–1936	Atlético Madrid	22	(0)
1939–1949	Real Madrid	232	(7)

International career
1936–1946	Spain	6	(0)

Managerial career
- 1950–1952: Real Valladolid
- 1952–1953: Real Madrid
- 1958–1959: Sevilla
- 1961–1962: Athletic Bilbao
- * Club domestic league appearances and goals

Juan Antonio Ipiña Iza (23 August 1912 – 7 September 1974) was a Spanish footballer and later a manager.

He coached Real Madrid CF from April 1952 to May 1953, having played with the club for ten years in the 1940s, and also coached Real Valladolid, Sevilla FC and Athletic Bilbao.

== Honours ==
=== Player ===
Real Madrid

- Copa del Generalísimo: 1946, 1947
- Copa Eva Duarte: 1946

Sporting positions
Preceded by Sauto	Real Madrid CF captain 1944–1949	Succeeded by Unknown
