= Félix Huete =

Spanish footballer

Félix Huete Pineño (25 August 1914 – 21 May 1991) was a Spanish professional association football player. He was born in Ciudad Real, Spain.

== Career ==
He played as a midfielder. He became an important player for Real Madrid C.F. in the 1940s, playing for the Spanish side from 1941 to 1948. He also played for Real Murcia, Racing de Santander and Malacitano.

He played 154 matches for Real Madrid in La Liga, scoring once. He also played 27 times in Copa del Rey.

== Titles ==
- 2 Copa del Rey

== International selection ==
He played only one match for Spain national football team on 6 June 1946, in Spain's defeat with Ireland.
