= Moleiro (footballer) =

Spanish footballer (1915–1999)

José Morales Berriguete, better known as Moleiro (30 March 1915 – 16 June 1999) was a Spanish professional association football player.

Moleiro was born in Carabanchel, Madrid on 30 March 1915. He spent his career playing as a midfielder. The most important part of his career was playing for Real Madrid C.F. in over 100 matches, scoring 10 times. Moleiro died on 16 June 1999, at the age of 84.

== Clubs ==
Club	Country	Period
Gimnastica de Carabanchel	Spain	1930
RCD Carabanchel	Spain	1930–1935
AD Ferroviaria	Spain	1935–1942
Real Madrid C.F.	Spain	1942–1948
Plus Ultra	Spain	1948–1952

== International selection ==
He played only one match for Spain national football team, on March 11, 1945, in 2-2 draw with Portugal.
