= 1947 Copa del Generalísimo =

45th Copa del Rey

Tournament details
- Country: Spain
- Teams: 28

Final positions
- Champions: Real Madrid CF (9th title)
- Runners-up: RCD Español

Tournament statistics
- Matches played: 57
- Goals scored: 207 (3.63 per match)

The 1947 Copa del Generalísimo was the 45th staging of the Copa del Rey, the Spanish football cup competition.

The competition began on 20 April 1947 and ended on 22 June 1947 with the final.

== First round ==
Team 1	Agg.	Team 2	1st leg	2nd leg
Real Murcia CF	3–7	Levante UD	1–3	2–4
Club Atlético de Madrid	6–4	Hércules CF	3–0	3–4
Baracaldo CF	0–7	RCD Español	0–2	0–5
Real Oviedo CF	4–3	Real Zaragoza CD	3–1	1–2
CD Castellón	5–5	Real Sociedad de Fútbol	3–2	2–3
Club Ferrol	4–5	Real Madrid CF	2–1	2–4
Granada CF	2–6	RC Celta de Vigo	0–1	2–5
Valencia CF	3–3	CD Alcoyano	3–2	0–1
RC Deportivo de La Coruña	1–3	Real Betis Balompié	1–0	0–3
CD Sabadell CF	3–2	RCD Córdoba	3–0	0–2
Sevilla CF	3–2	RCD Mallorca	2–1	1–1
Club Gimnástico de Tarragona	5–3	Real Gijón	4–2	1–1

Source: RSSSF

- Tiebreaker

Team 1	Score	Team 2
CD Castellón	3–2	Real Sociedad de Fútbol
Valencia CF	2–1	CD Alcoyano

- Bye: Club Atlético de Bilbao, CF Barcelona, Real Santander SD, CD Málaga

== Round of 16 ==
Team 1	Agg.	Team 2	1st leg	2nd leg
CF Barcelona	4–2	CD Málaga	3–1	1–1
Club Atlético de Madrid	1–4	CD Castellón	1–1	0–3
Real Santander SD	7–7	Club Gimnástico de Tarragona	6–2	1–5
Real Oviedo CF	1–3	RCD Español	0–0	1–3
Valencia CF	1–1	RC Celta de Vigo	0–0	1–1
Real Betis Balompié	4–6	Real Madrid CF	4–0	0–6
Club Atlético de Bilbao	8–6	Levante UD	6–2	2–4
CD Sabadell CF	3–2	Sevilla CF	2–0	1–2

Source: RSSSF

- Tiebreaker

Team 1	Score	Team 2
Valencia CF	0–1	RC Celta de Vigo
Real Santander SD	0–1	Club Gimnástico de Tarragona

== Quarter-finals ==
Team 1	Agg.	Team 2	1st leg	2nd leg
CF Barcelona	3–4	Club Gimnástico de Tarragona	0–2	3–2
Real Madrid CF	3–0	CD Castellón	2–0	1–0
Club Atlético de Bilbao	12–2	RC Celta de Vigo	12–1	0–1
CD Sabadell CF	2–5	RCD Español	2–3	0–2

Source: RSSSF

== Semi-finals ==
Team 1	Agg.	Team 2	1st leg	2nd leg
RCD Español	5–4	Club Gimnástico de Tarragona	5–3	0–1
Real Madrid CF	4–2	Club Atlético de Bilbao	3–2	1–0

Source: RSSSF

== Final ==
Team 1	Score	Team 2
Real Madrid CF	2–0 (aet)	RCD Español

Copa del Generalísimo
winners
Real Madrid CF
9th title
