= 1946 Copa del Generalísimo =

44th Copa del Rey

Tournament details
- Country: Spain
- Teams: 28

Final positions
- Champions: Real Madrid CF (8th title)
- Runners-up: Valencia CF

Tournament statistics
- Matches played: 56

The 1946 Copa del Generalísimo was the 44th staging of the Copa del Rey, the Spanish football cup competition.

The competition began on April 7, 1946, and concluded on June 9, 1946, with the final.

== First round ==
Team 1	Agg.	Team 2	1st leg	2nd leg
RC Deportivo de La Coruña	3–7	RCD Español	1–2	2–5
Real Madrid CF	7–2	Club Ferrol	4–1	3–1
Real Gijón	8–3	Real Santander SD	8–1	0–2
CD Sabadell CF	3–6	Club Atlético de Bilbao	2–4	1–2
Real Sociedad de Fútbol	5–7	Club Atlético de Aviación	3–3	2–4
Valencia CF	8–1	Real Betis Balompié	5–0	3–1
Real Zaragoza CD	2–4	Real Murcia CF	2–1	0–3
Xerez FC	2–7	RC Celta de Vigo	2–1	0–6
Hércules CF	3–5	Club Gimnástico de Tarragona	1–1	2–4
RCD Mallorca	1–3	Real Oviedo CF	1–1	0–2
RCD Córdoba	4–4	CD Castellón	3–1	1–3
UD Salamanca	3–8	CD Alcoyano	2–3	1–5

Source: RSSSF

- Tiebreaker

Team 1	Score	Team 2
RCD Córdoba	2–1	CD Castellón

== Round of 16 ==
Team 1	Agg.	Team 2	1st leg	2nd leg
RC Celta de Vigo	0–9	Valencia CF	0–2	0–7
Sevilla CF	8–1	CF Barcelona	8–0	0–1
RCD Español	3–3	Real Oviedo CF	2–0	1–3
Real Gijón	4–11	Club Atlético de Aviación	3–4	1–7
Club Gimnástico de Tarragona	1–2	Granada CF	1–0	0–2
Real Madrid CF	6–1	SD Ceuta	6–0	0–1
Club Atlético de Bilbao	3–5	CD Alcoyano	3–3	0–2
RCD Córdoba	2–2	Real Murcia CF	1–0	1–2

Source: RSSSF

- Tiebreaker

Team 1	Score	Team 2
RCD Español	1–2	Real Oviedo CF
RCD Córdoba	2–0	Real Murcia CF

Barcelona's lose to Sevilla was the final time they conceded 8 goals in a single match until they lose to Bayern Munich in 2019-20 UEFA Champions League quarter-final.

== Quarter-finals ==
Team 1	Agg.	Team 2	1st leg	2nd leg
Real Oviedo CF	3–1	RCD Córdoba	1–0	2–1
Valencia CF	4–2	Granada CF	4–1	0–1
CD Alcoyano	2–4	Real Madrid CF	2–2	0–2
Atlético Aviación	4–6	Sevilla CF	1–0	3–6

Source: RSSSF

== Semi-finals ==
Team 1	Agg.	Team 2	1st leg	2nd leg
Real Oviedo CF	1–4	Real Madrid CF	0–1	1–3
Valencia CF	7–1	Sevilla CF	7–0	0–1

Source: RSSSF

== Final ==
Team 1	Score	Team 2
Real Madrid CF	3–1	Valencia CF

Copa del Generalísimo
winners
Real Madrid CF
8th title
