= El Clásico =

Match between FC Barcelona and Real Madrid CF

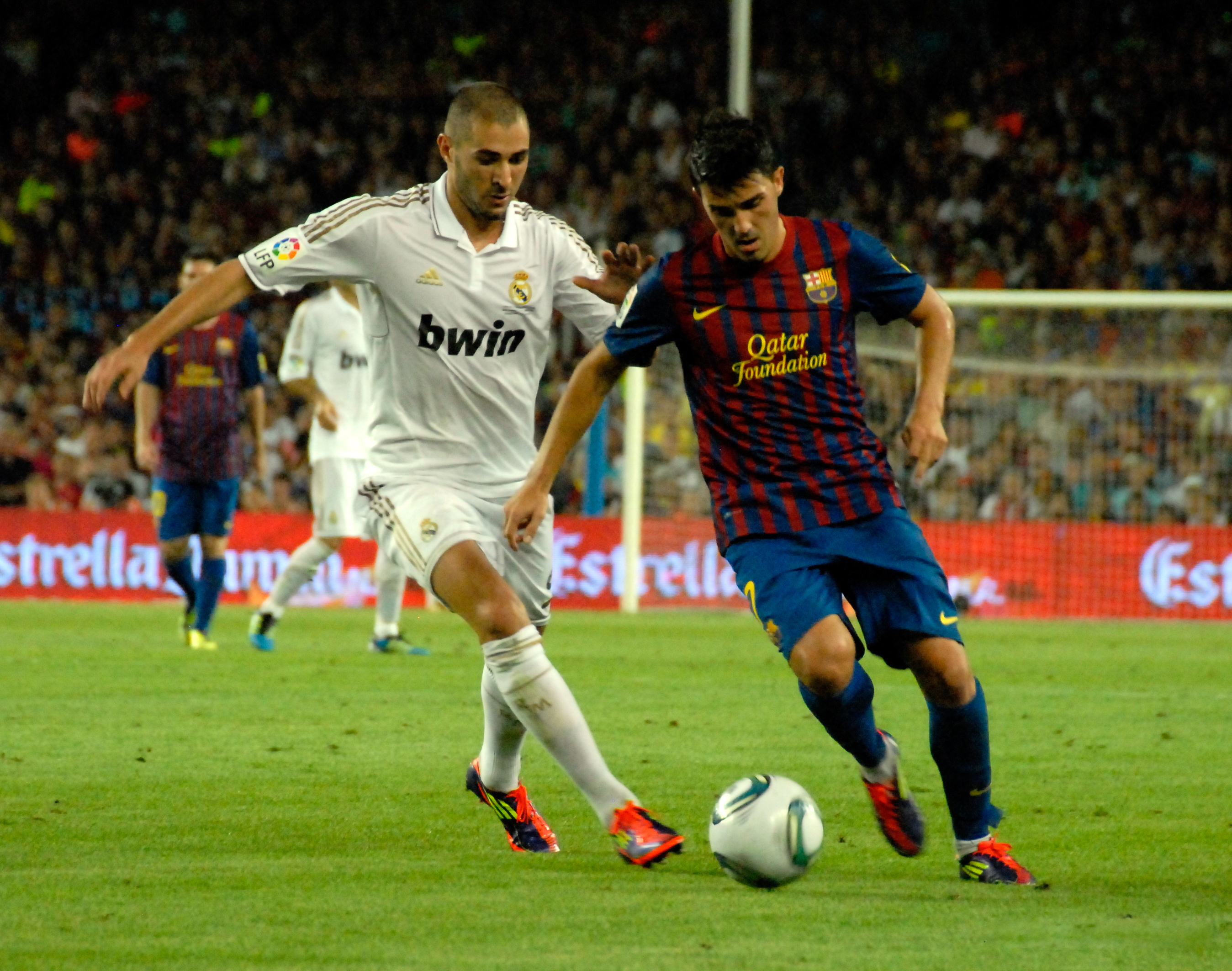
- Barcelona's David Villa (right) and Real Madrid's Karim Benzema contesting the 2011 Supercopa de España
- Native name: El Clásico (Spanish); El Clàssic (Catalan)
- Location: Spain
- Teams: Barcelona; Real Madrid
- First meeting: 13 May 1902; Copa de la Coronación; FC Barcelona 3–1 Madrid FC
- Latest meeting: 25 October 2026; La Liga; Barcelona 1–2 Real Madrid
- Next meeting: 9 May 2027; La Liga; Real Madrid v Barcelona
- Stadiums: Camp Nou (Barcelona); Bernabéu (Real Madrid)

Statistics
- Total meetings: 265 (official matches)
- Most wins: Real Madrid (107)
- Most player appearances: Sergio Busquets (48)
- Top scorer: Lionel Messi (26) (Note: Does not include a goal scored in the friendly 2017 International Champions Cup.)
- Largest victory: Real Madrid 11–1 Barcelona; Copa del Rey (19 June 1943)
- Longest win streak: 7 matches Real Madrid (1962–1965)

El Clásico (in Spanish, also in lowercase letters; Spanish pronunciation: [el ˈklasiko]) or El Clàssic (in Catalan, pronounced [əl ˈklasik]), both meaning "The Classic", is the name given to any football match between rival clubs Barcelona and Real Madrid. Originally referring to competitions held in the Spanish championship, the term now includes every match between the clubs, such as those in the UEFA Champions League, Copa del Rey, and Supercopa de España. It is considered one of sport's fiercest rivalries, and its matches have a global audience of hundreds of millions. A fixture known for its intensity, it has featured memorable goal celebrations from both teams, often involving mockery from both sides.

The fixture is politicised due to the Catalan independence movement, as Madrid is the capital and largest city in Spain and Barcelona is the capital and largest city of the autonomous community of Catalonia; the two teams are hence respectively identified with Spanish unionism and Catalan separatism. They are among the wealthiest and most successful football clubs in the world; in 2024, Forbes ranked Real Madrid and Barcelona among the most valuable football teams in the world, in first and third place respectively.

Real Madrid leads in head-to-head results in official competitive matches with 107 wins to Barcelona's 106 with 52 draws as of the match played on 25 October 2026. Along with Athletic Bilbao, they are the only clubs in La Liga never to have been relegated.

== Rivalry ==
=== History ===
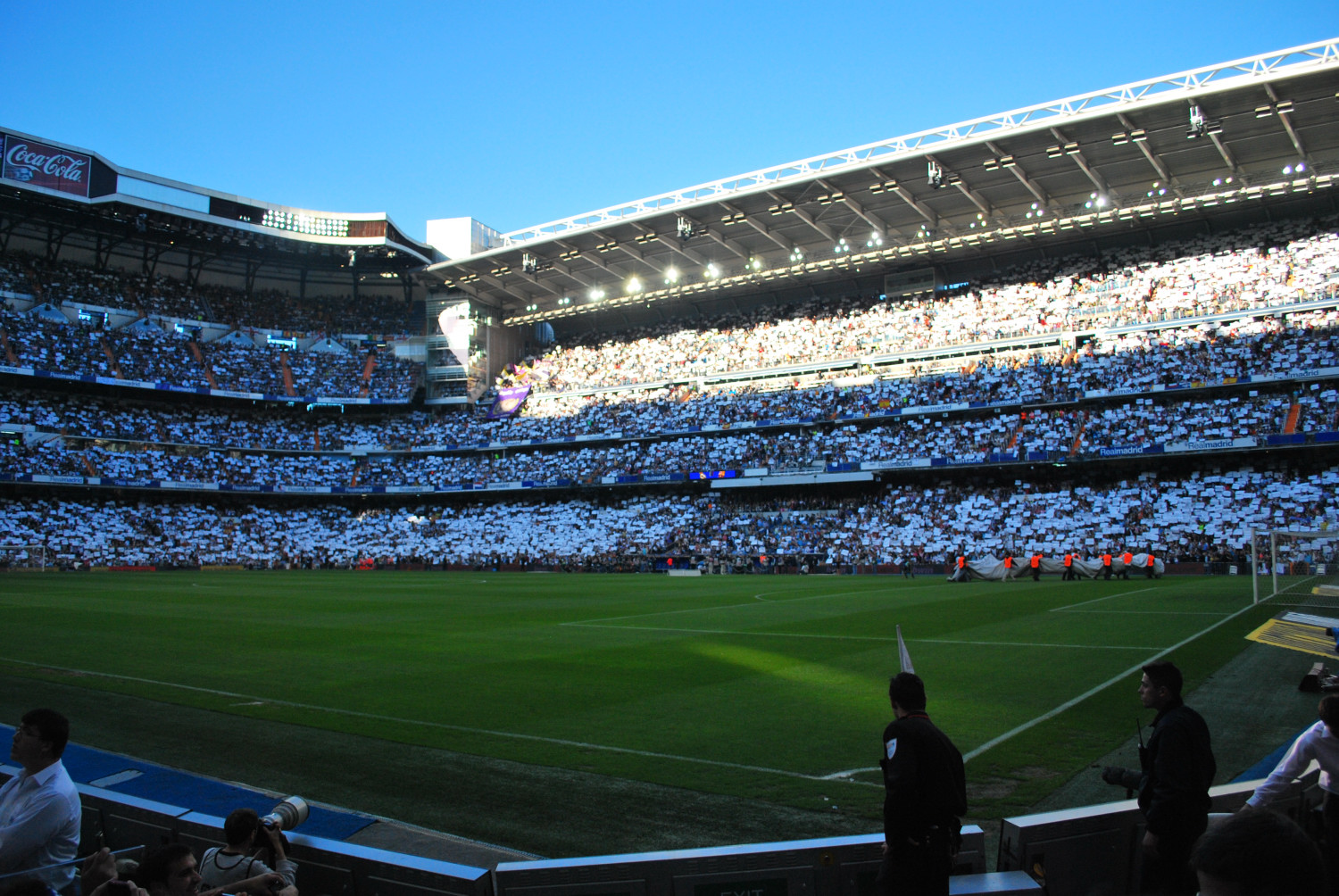
Bernabéu (before renovation), the home of Real Madrid, before El Clásico

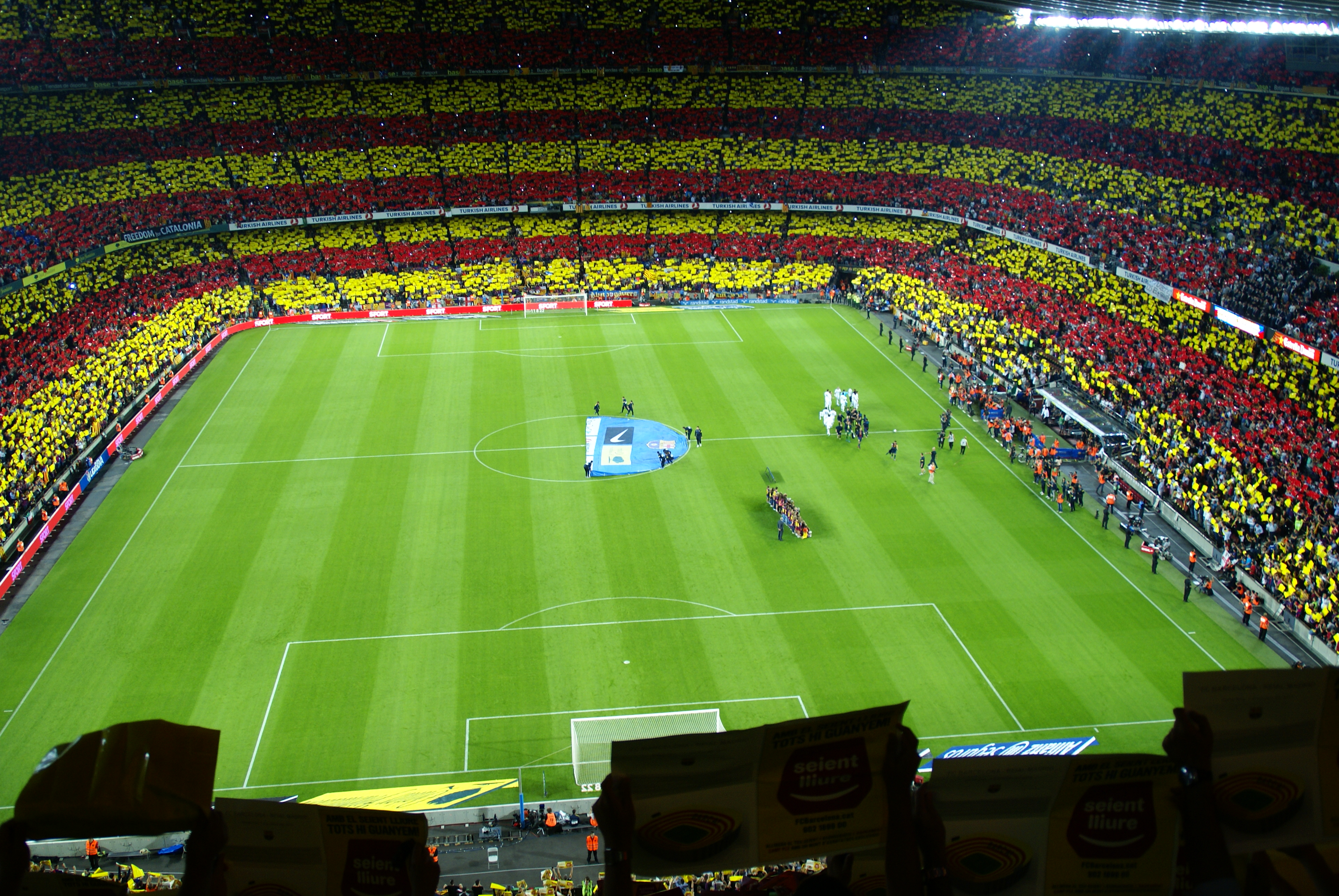
Camp Nou (before renovation), the home of FC Barcelona, before El Clásico. The fans of Barcelona are creating a mosaic of the Catalan flag.

The conflict between Real Madrid and Barcelona has long surpassed the sporting dimension, so much that elections to the clubs' presidencies have been strongly politicized. Phil Ball, the author of Morbo: The Story of Spanish Football, says about the match, "they hate each other with an intensity that can truly shock the outsider".

As early as the 1930s, Barcelona "had developed a reputation as a symbol of Catalan identity, opposed to the centralising tendencies of Madrid". In 1936, when Francisco Franco started the coup d'état against the democratic Second Spanish Republic, the president of Barcelona, Josep Sunyol, member of the Republican Left of Catalonia and Deputy to The Cortes, was arrested and executed without trial by Franco's troops (Sunyol was exercising his political activities, visiting Republican troops north of Madrid). During the dictatorships of Miguel Primo de Rivera and especially Francisco Franco, all regional languages and identities in Spain were frowned upon and restrained. As such, most citizens of Barcelona were in strong opposition to the fascist-like regime. In this period, Barcelona gained their motto Més que un club (English: More than a club) because of its alleged connection to Catalan nationalist as well as to progressive beliefs.

There is an ongoing controversy as to what extent Franco's rule (1939–75) influenced the activities and on-pitch results of both Barcelona and Real Madrid. Most historians agree that Franco did not have a preferred football team, but his Spanish nationalist beliefs led him to associate himself with the establishment teams, such as Atlético Aviación and Madrid FC (which recovered its royal name after the fall of the Republic). On the other hand, he also wanted the renamed CF Barcelona to succeed as a "Spanish team" rather than a Catalan one. During the early years of Franco's rule, Real Madrid were not particularly successful, winning two Copa del Generalísimo titles and a Copa Eva Duarte; Barcelona claimed three league titles, one Copa del Generalísimo and one Copa Eva Duarte. During that period, Atlético Aviación were believed to be the preferred team over Real Madrid. Events of the period include Real Madrid's 11–1 home win against Barcelona in the Copa del Generalísimo, where the Catalan team alleged intimidation, and the controversial transfer of Alfredo Di Stéfano to Real Madrid despite his agreement with Barcelona. The latter transfer was part of Real Madrid chairman Santiago Bernabéu's "revolution" that ushered in the era of unprecedented dominance. Bernabéu, himself a veteran of the Civil War who fought for Franco's forces, saw Real Madrid on top not only of Spanish but also European football, helping create the European Cup, the first true competition for Europe's best club sides. His vision was fulfilled when Real Madrid not only started winning consecutive league titles but also won the first five editions of the European Cup in the 1950s. These events had a profound impact on Spanish football and influenced Franco's attitude. According to historians, during this time he realized the importance of Real Madrid for his regime's international image, and the club became his preferred team until his death. Fernando Maria Castiella, who served as Minister of Foreign Affairs under Franco from 1957 until 1969, noted that "[Real Madrid] is the best embassy we have ever had." Franco died in 1975, and the Spanish transition to democracy soon followed. Under his rule, Real Madrid had won 14 league titles, 6 Copa del Generalísimo titles, 1 Copa Eva Duarte, 6 European Cups, 2 Latin Cups and 1 Intercontinental Cup. In the same period, Barcelona had won 8 league titles, 9 Copa del Generalísimo titles, 3 Copa Eva Duarte titles, 3 Inter-Cities Fairs Cups, and 2 Latin Cups.

The image for both clubs was further affected by the creation of ultras groups, some of which became hooligans. In 1980, Ultras Sur was founded as a far-right-leaning Real Madrid ultras group, followed in 1981 by the foundation of the – initially left-leaning, and later on far-right – Barcelona ultras group Boixos Nois. Both groups became known for their violent acts, and one of the most conflictive factions of Barcelona supporters, the Casuals, became a full-fledged criminal organisation.

For many people, Barcelona is still considered "the rebellious club", or the alternative pole to "Real Madrid's conservatism". According to polls released by CIS (Centro de Investigaciones Sociológicas), Real Madrid is the favorite team of the most Spanish residents, while Barcelona stands in second position. In Catalonia, forces of all the political spectrum are overwhelmingly in favour of Barcelona. Nevertheless, the support of the blaugrana club (Barcelona) goes far beyond from that region, earning its best results among young people, sustainers of a federal structure of Spain and citizens with left-wing ideology, in contrast with Real Madrid fans which politically tend to adopt right-wing views.

=== 1943 Copa del Generalísimo semi-finals ===
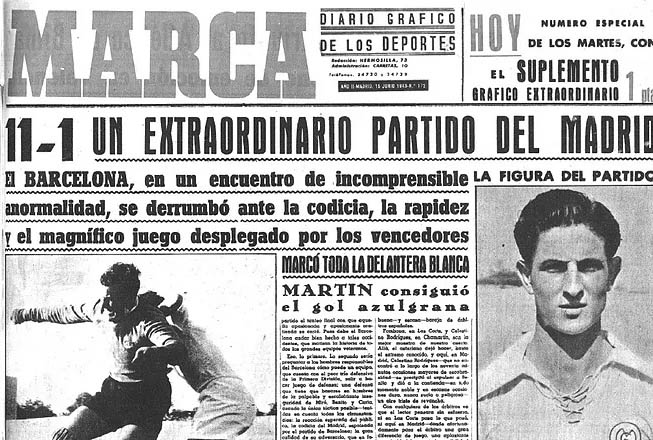
Cover of Marca newspaper titled "an extraordinary match of Real Madrid" to describe the 11–1 win over Barcelona

On 13 June 1943, Real Madrid beat Barcelona 11–1 at the Chamartín in the second leg of the Copa del Generalísimo semi-finals (the Copa del Presidente de la República having been renamed in honour of General Franco). The first leg, played at the Les Corts in Catalonia, had ended with Barcelona winning 3–0. Madrid complained about all the three goals that referee Fombona Fernández had allowed for Barcelona, with the home supporters also whistling Madrid throughout, whom they accused of employing roughhouse tactics, and Fombona for allowing them to. Barça's Josep Escolà was stretchered off in the first half with José María Querejeta's stud marks in his stomach. A campaign began in Madrid. The newspaper Ya reported the whistling as a "clear intention to attack the representatives of Spain." Barcelona player Josep Valle recalled: "The press officer at the DND and ABC newspaper wrote all sorts of scurrilous lies, really terrible things, winding up the Madrid fans like never before". Former Real Madrid goalkeeper Eduardo Teus, who admitted that Madrid had "above all played hard", wrote in a newspaper: "the ground itself made Madrid concede two of the three goals, goals that were totally unfair".

Barcelona fans were banned from traveling to Madrid. Real Madrid released a statement after the match which former club president Ramón Mendoza explained, "The message got through that those fans who wanted to could go to El Club bar on Calle de la Victoria where Madrid's social center was. There, they were given a whistle. Others had whistles handed to them with their tickets." The day of the second leg, the Barcelona team were insulted and stones were thrown at their bus as soon as they left their hotel. Barcelona's striker Mariano Gonzalvo said of the incident, "Five minutes before the game had started, our penalty area was already full of coins." Barcelona goalkeeper Lluis Miró rarely approached his line—when he did, he was armed with stones. As Francisco Calvet told the story, "They were shouting: Reds! Separatists!... a bottle just missed Sospedra that would have killed him if it had hit him. It was all set up."

Real Madrid went 2–0 up within half an hour. The third goal brought with it a sending off for Barcelona's Benito García after he made what Calvet claimed was a "completely normal tackle". Madrid's José Llopis Corona recalled, "At which point, they got a bit demoralized," while Ángel Mur countered, "at which point, we thought: 'go on then, score as many as you want'." Madrid scored in minutes 31', 33', 35', 39', 43' and 44', as well as two goals ruled out for offside, made it 8–0. Juan Samaranch wrote: "In that atmosphere and with a referee who wanted to avoid any complications, it was humanly impossible to play... If the azulgranas had played badly, really badly, the scoreboard would still not have reached that astronomical figure. The point is that they did not play at all." Both clubs were fined 2,500 pesetas by the Royal Spanish Football Federation and, although Barcelona appealed, it made no difference. Piñeyro resigned in protest, complaining of "a campaign that the press has run against Barcelona for a week and which culminated in the shameful day at Chamartín".

The match report in the newspaper La Prensa described Barcelona's only goal as a "reminder that there was a team there who knew how to play football and that if they did not do so that afternoon, it was not exactly their fault". Another newspaper called the scoreline "as absurd as it was abnormal". According to football writer Sid Lowe, "There have been relatively few mentions of the game [since] and it is not a result that has been particularly celebrated in Madrid. Indeed, the 11–1 occupies a far more prominent place in Barcelona's history. This was the game that first formed the identification of Madrid as the team of the dictatorship and Barcelona as its victims." Fernando Argila, Barcelona's reserve goalkeeper from the game, said, "There was no rivalry. Not, at least, until that game."

=== Di Stéfano transfer ===
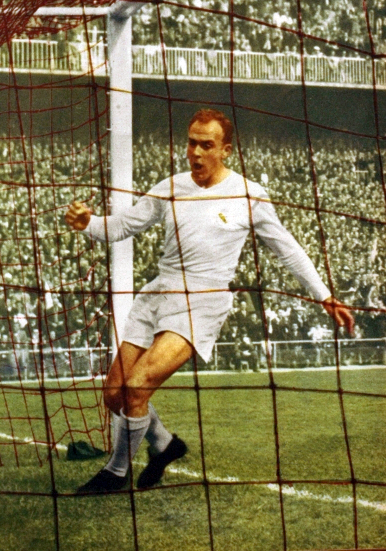
Alfredo Di Stéfano's controversial 1953 transfer to Real Madrid instead of Barcelona intensified the rivalry.

The rivalry was intensified during the 1950s when the clubs disputed the signing of Argentine forward Alfredo Di Stéfano. Di Stéfano had impressed both Barcelona and Real Madrid while playing for Los Millonarios in Bogotá, Colombia, during a players' strike in his native Argentina. Soon after Millonarios' return to Colombia, Barcelona directors visited Buenos Aires and agreed with River Plate, the last FIFA-affiliated team to have held Di Stéfano's rights, for his transfer in 1954 for the equivalent of 150 million Italian lira ($200,000 according to other sources). This started a battle between the two Spanish rivals for his rights. FIFA appointed Armando Muñoz Calero, former president of the Spanish Football Federation, as mediator. Calero decided to let Di Stéfano play the 1953–54 and 1955–56 seasons in Madrid, and the 1954–55 and 1956–57 seasons in Barcelona. The agreement was approved by the Football Association and their respective clubs. Although the Catalans agreed, the decision created discontent among various Blaugrana members and the president was forced to resign in September 1953. Barcelona sold Madrid their half-share, and Di Stéfano moved to Los Blancos, signing a four-year contract. Real paid 5.5 million Spanish pesetas for the transfer, plus a 1.3 million bonus for the purchase, an annual fee to be paid to Millonarios, and a 16,000 salary for Di Stéfano with a bonus double that of his teammates, for a total of 40% of the annual revenue of the Madrid club.

Di Stéfano became integral in the subsequent success achieved by Real Madrid, scoring twice in his first game against Barcelona. With him, Madrid won the first five editions of the European Cup. The 1960s saw the rivalry reach the European stage when Real Madrid and Barcelona met twice in the European Cup, with Madrid triumphing en route to their fifth consecutive title in 1959–60 and Barcelona prevailing en route to losing the final in 1960–61.

=== Final of the bottles ===
On 11 July 1968, Barcelona beat Real Madrid 1–0 in the Copa del Generalísimo final at the Santiago Bernabéu. Real Madrid fans, angry about the refereeing, started throwing bottles at the referee and Barcelona players in the last minutes of the match. Antonio Rigo, the referee of the final, was accused of favouring Barcelona. Regarding the two not awarded penalties, he said "I didn't see a penalty on Amancio, and Serena tripped. He wanted to deceive me by diving when he entered the penalty area." He also accused the Real Madrid manager of trying to bribe him with a pre-match gift. General Franco presented the trophy to Barcelona with a pitch full of bottles, hence the name.

=== Luís Figo transfer ===
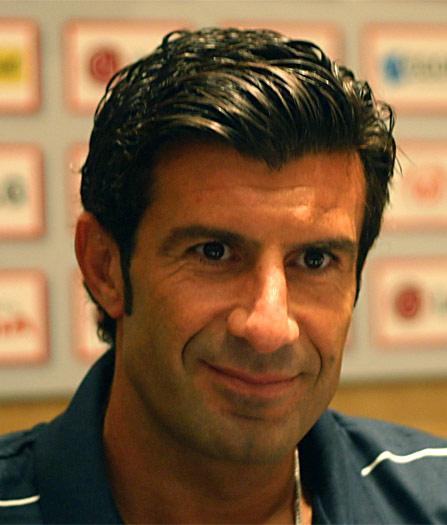
Luís Figo's transfer from Barcelona to Real Madrid in 2000 resulted in a hate campaign by some of his former club's fans.

In 2000, Real Madrid's then-presidential candidate, Florentino Pérez, offered Barcelona's vice-captain Luís Figo $2.4 million to sign an agreement binding him to Madrid if he won the elections. If Figo broke the deal, he would have to pay Pérez $30 million in compensation. When his agent confirmed the deal, Figo denied everything, insisting, "I'll stay at Barcelona whether Pérez wins or loses." He accused the presidential candidate of "lying" and "fantasizing". He told Barcelona teammates Luis Enrique and Pep Guardiola he was not leaving and they conveyed the message to the Barcelona squad.

On 9 July, Sport ran an interview in which he said, "I want to send a message of calm to Barcelona's fans, for whom I always have and always will feel great affection. I want to assure them that Luís Figo will, with absolute certainty, be at the Camp Nou on the 24th to start the new season... I've not signed a pre-contract with a presidential candidate at Real Madrid. No. I'm not so mad as to do a thing like that."

Barcelona's new president, Joan Gaspart, called the media and told them, "Today, Figo gave me the impression that he wanted to do two things: get richer and stay at Barça." However, the following day, 24 July, Figo was presented in Madrid and handed his new shirt by Alfredo Di Stéfano. His buyout clause was set at $180 million. Gaspart later admitted, "Figo's move destroyed us."

On his return to Barcelona in a Real Madrid shirt, banners with "Judas", "Scum" and "Mercenary" were hung around the stadium. Thousands of fake 10,000 peseta notes had been printed and emblazoned with his image, were among the missiles of oranges, bottles, cigarette lighters, even a couple of mobile phones were thrown at him. In his third season with Real Madrid, the 2002 Clásico at Camp Nou produced one of the defining images of the rivalry. Figo was taunted throughout; missiles of coins, a knife, a whisky bottle, were raining down from the stands, mostly from areas populated by the Boixos Nois where he had been taking a corner. Among the debris was a pig's head.

=== Recent issues ===
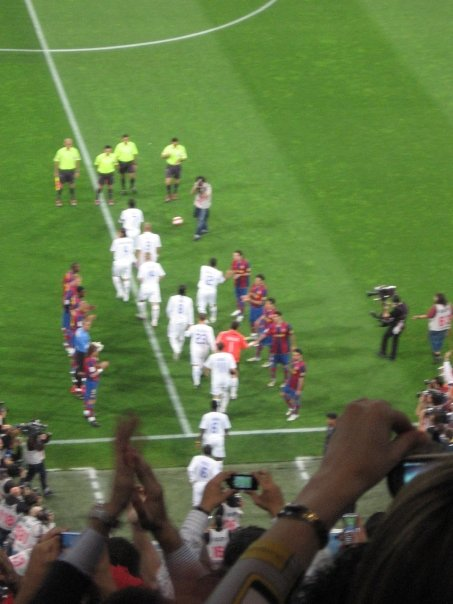
Barcelona players performing the pasillo at the Santiago Bernabéu in 2008

During the last decades, the rivalry has been augmented by the modern Spanish tradition of the pasillo, where one team is given the guard of honor by the other team, once the former clinches the La Liga trophy before El Clásico takes place. This has happened on three occasions. First, during El Clásico that took place on 30 April 1988, in which Real Madrid had won the league championship in the previous round; then three years later, when Barcelona won the championship two rounds before El Clásico on 8 June 1991; and most recently on 7 May 2008, when Real Madrid had won the championship. In May 2018, Real Madrid refused to perform the pasillo for Barcelona even though the latter had already wrapped up the championship a round prior to their meeting. Real Madrid's coach at the time, Zinedine Zidane, reasoned that Barcelona also refused to perform it five months earlier, on 23 December 2017, when Real Madrid were the FIFA Club World Cup champions.

The two teams met again in the UEFA Champions League semi-finals in 2002, with Real winning 2–0 in Barcelona and drawing 1–1 in Madrid, resulting in a 3–1 aggregate win for Los Blancos. The tie was dubbed by Spanish media as the "Match of the Century".

While El Clásico is regarded as one of the fiercest rivalries in world football, there have been rare moments when fans have shown praise for a player on the opposing team. In 1980, Laurie Cunningham was the first Real Madrid player to receive applause from Barcelona fans at Camp Nou; after excelling during the match, and with Madrid winning 2–0, Cunningham left the field to a standing ovation from the locals. On 26 June 1983, during the second leg of the Copa de la Liga final at the Santiago Bernabéu in Madrid, having dribbled past the Real Madrid goalkeeper, Barcelona star Diego Maradona ran towards an empty goal before stopping just as the Madrid defender Juan José came sliding in an attempt to block the shot and crashed into the post, before Maradona slotted the ball into the net. The manner of Maradona's goal led to many Madrid fans inside the stadium start applauding. In November 2005, Ronaldinho became the second Barcelona player to receive a standing ovation from Madrid fans at the Santiago Bernabéu. After dribbling through the Madrid defence twice to score two goals in a 3–0 win, Madrid fans paid homage to his performance with applause. On 21 November 2015, Andrés Iniesta became the third Barcelona player to receive applause from Real Madrid fans while he was substituted during a 4–0 away win, with Iniesta scoring Barça's third. He was already a popular figure throughout Spain for scoring the nation's World Cup-winning goal in 2010.

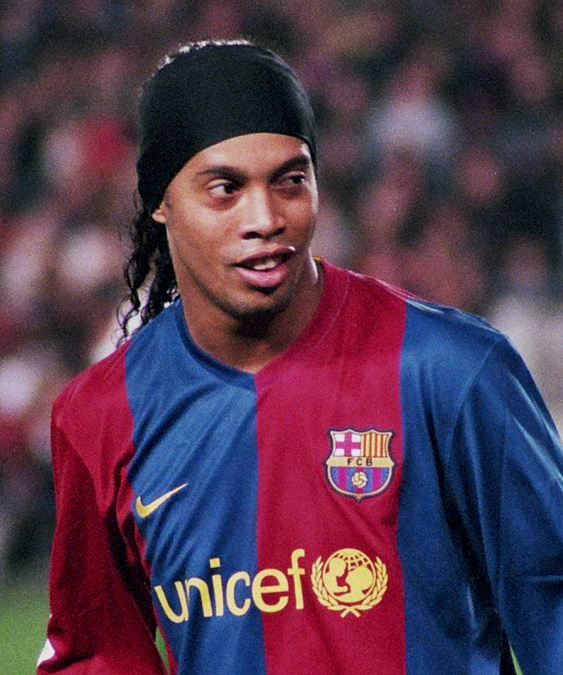
In 2005, Ronaldinho became the second Barcelona player, after Diego Maradona in 1983, to receive a standing ovation from Real Madrid fans at the Santiago Bernabéu.

A 2007 survey by the Centro de Investigaciones Sociológicas showed that 32% of the Spanish population supported Real Madrid while 25% supported Barcelona. In third place came Valencia, with 5%. According to an Ikerfel poll in 2011, Barcelona is the most popular team in Spain with 44% of preferences, while Real Madrid is second with 37%. Atlético Madrid, Valencia and Athletic Bilbao complete the top five.

The rivalry intensified in 2011, when Barcelona and Real Madrid were scheduled to meet each other four times in 18 days, including the Copa Del Rey final and UEFA Champions League semi-finals. Several accusations of unsportsmanlike behaviour from both teams and a war of words erupted throughout the fixtures, which included four red cards. Spain national team coach Vicente del Bosque stated that he was "concerned" that due to the rising hatred between the two clubs, that this could cause friction in the Spain team.

A fixture known for its intensity and indiscipline, it has also featured memorable goal celebrations from both teams, often involving mocking the opposition. In October 1999, Real Madrid forward Raúl silenced 100,000 Barcelona fans at the Camp Nou when he scored an 86th–minute equalizer before he celebrated by putting a finger to his lips as if telling the crowd to be quiet. In May 2009, Barcelona captain Carles Puyol kissed his Catalan armband in front of Madrid fans at the Santiago Bernabéu after his 21st–minute headed goal in a 6–2 win. Cristiano Ronaldo twice gestured to the hostile crowd to "calm down" after scoring against Barcelona at the Camp Nou in 2012 and 2016, both being the winning goals in 2–1 wins. In April 2017, in Barcelona's 3–2 win, Lionel Messi celebrated his 93rd-minute winner against Real Madrid at the Santiago Bernabéu by taking off his Barcelona shirt and holding it up to incensed Real Madrid fans – with his name and number facing them. Later that year, in August, Cristiano Ronaldo was subbed on during the 3–1 first-leg victory in the Supercopa de España, scored in the 80th minute, and took his shirt off before holding it up to Barça's fans with his name and number facing them. However, he was sent off moments later, having been awarded a second yellow card for simulation.

== Player rivalries ==
=== László Kubala and Alfredo Di Stéfano (1953–1961) ===
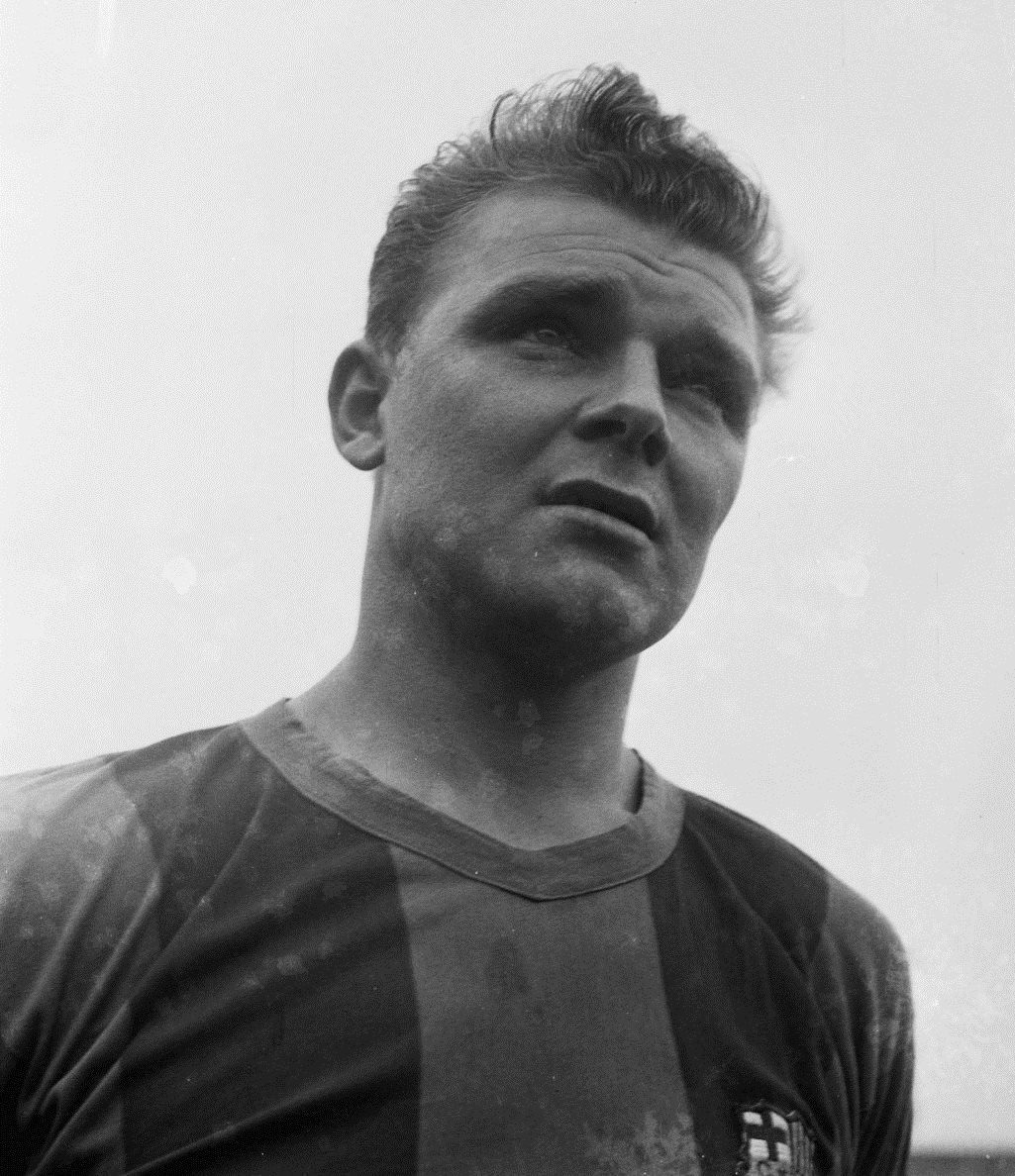
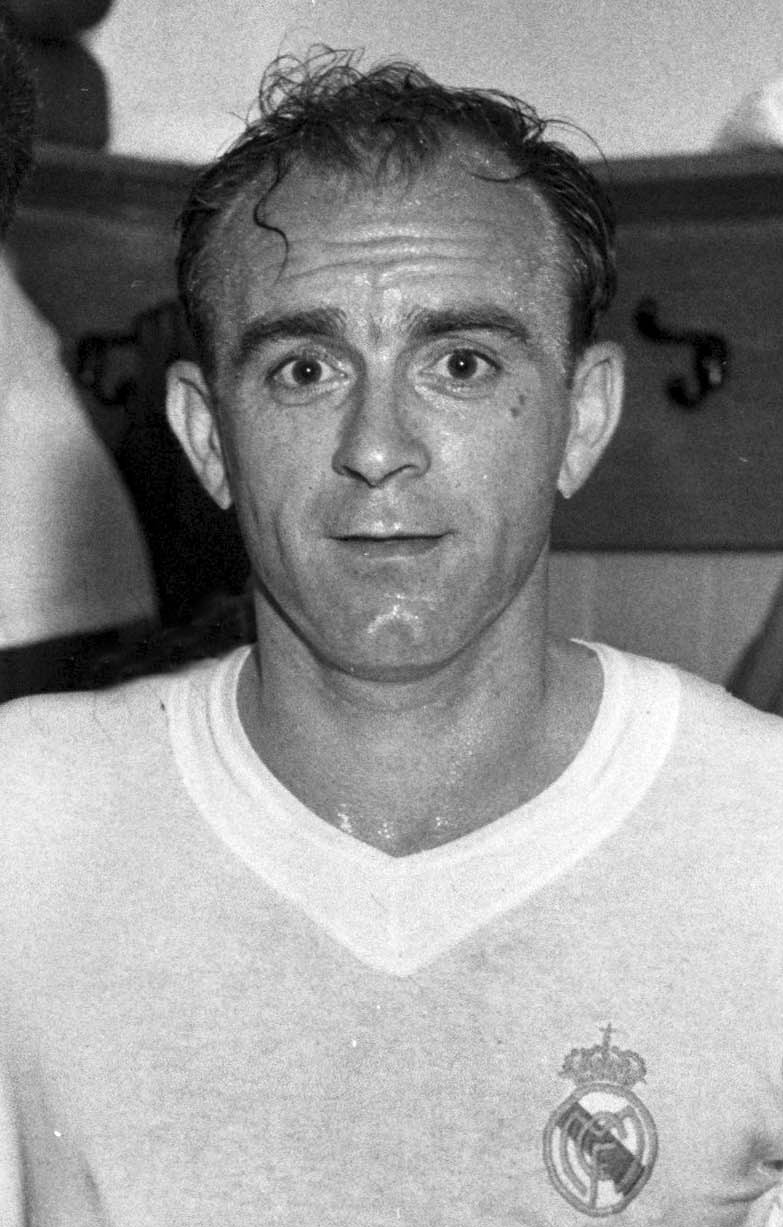
László Kubala (left) and Alfredo Di Stéfano

Until the early 1950s, Real Madrid was not a regular title contender in Spain, having won only two Primera División titles between 1929 and 1953. However, things changed for Real after the arrival of Alfredo Di Stéfano in 1953, Paco Gento in the same year, Raymond Kopa in 1956, and Ferenc Puskás in 1958. Real Madrid's strength increased in this period until the team dominated Spain and Europe, while Barcelona relied on its Hungarian star László Kubala and Luis Suárez, who joined in 1955 in addition to the Hungarian players Sándor Kocsis and Zoltán Czibor and the Brazilian Evaristo. With the arrival of Kubala and Di Stéfano, Barcelona and Real Madrid became among the most important European clubs in those years, and the players represented the turning point in the history of their teams.

With Kubala and Di Stéfano, a rivalry was born, but it would still take a long time to become what it is today. This period was characterized by the abundance of matches in different tournaments, as they faced each other in all the tournaments available at the time, especially at the European level, where they met twice in two consecutive seasons. In their period, El Clásico was played 26 times: Real won 13 matches, Barcelona 10 matches, and 3 ended in a draw. Di Stéfano scored 14 and Kubala scored 4 goals in those matches.

=== Cristiano Ronaldo and Lionel Messi (2009–2018) ===
The rivalry between Lionel Messi and Cristiano Ronaldo between 2009 and 2018 has been the most competitive in El Clásico history, with both players being their clubs' all-time top scorers. In their period, many records were broken for both clubs; the two players alternated as top scorers in La Liga and the Champions League during most seasons while they were with Real Madrid and Barcelona. During this period, Ronaldo won the European Golden Shoe three times and Messi five times. In addition, Messi won the Ballon d'Or five times and Ronaldo four times.

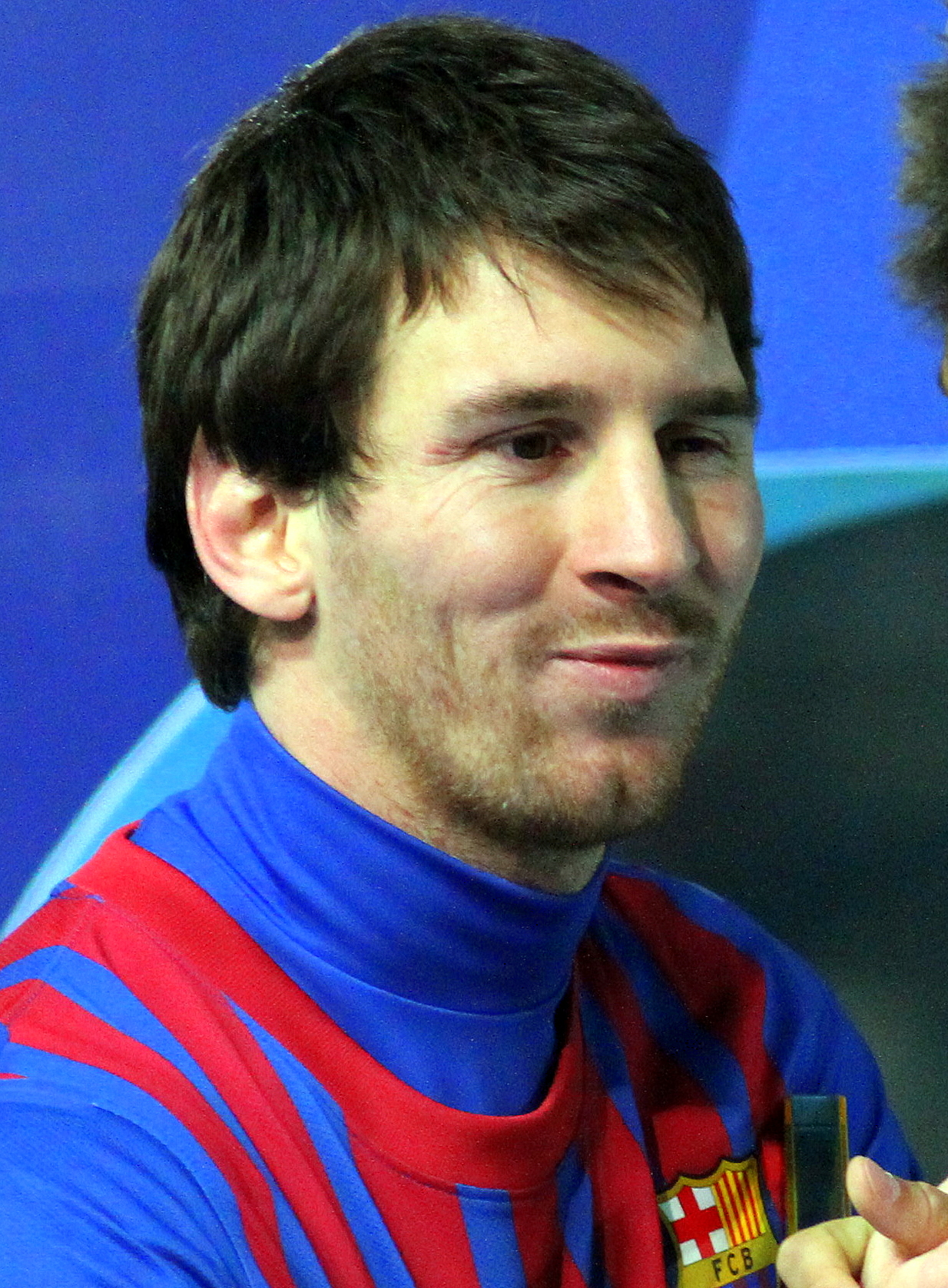
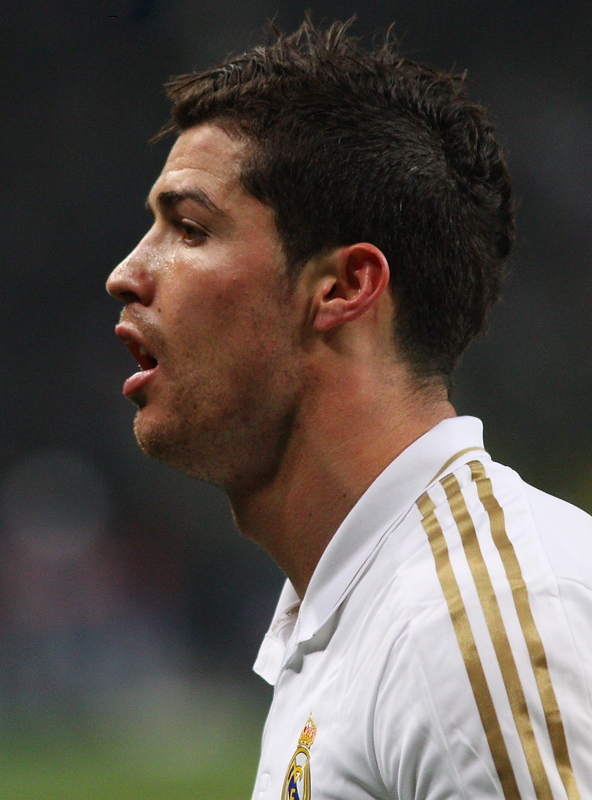
Lionel Messi (left) and Cristiano Ronaldo during the 2011–12 season

During the nine years they played together in Spain, the two players scored a total of 922 goals, including 38 goals in El Clásico matches, 20 scored by Messi and 18 by Ronaldo. As of 2024, Ronaldo is the all-time top scorer in the UEFA Champions League, followed by Messi in the second place. In addition, Messi is the all-time top scorer of La Liga with 474 goals, and Ronaldo is ranked second with 311 goals. Both players contributed to their club's record for the most points in La Liga history, with 100 points in the 2011–12 season for Real Madrid and in the 2012–13 season for Barcelona.

The Messi–Ronaldo rivalry was characterized by a lot of goals scored by both players, contributing to many domestic and European titles for both teams. Their clubs were dominant in Europe, as they won six Champions League titles in nine seasons, including five consecutive seasons between 2014 and 2018. In El Clásico matches, Messi has scored 26 goals in his career, which is the record. Ronaldo has scored 18, which is the joint second-most in the fixture's history alongside Di Stéfano. Ronaldo, on the other hand, has a slight advantage in terms of minutes per goal ratio, scoring a goal for every 141 minutes played in El Clásico matches. Only slightly behind is Messi, scoring a goal every 151.54 minutes.

In their period, the rivalry between Real Madrid and Barcelona has been encapsulated by the rivalry between Ronaldo and Messi. Following the star signings of Neymar and Luis Suárez by Barcelona, and Gareth Bale and Karim Benzema by Real Madrid, the rivalry was expanded to a battle of the clubs' attacking trios, nicknamed "BBC" (Bale–Benzema–Cristiano) and "MSN" (Messi–Suárez–Neymar). Ronaldo left Real Madrid for Juventus in 2018, and in the week prior to the first meeting of the teams in the 2018–19 La Liga, Messi sustained an arm injury, ruling him out of the match. It would be the first time since 2007 that the Clásico had featured neither player, with some in the media describing it as the 'end of an era'. Barcelona won the match 5–1.

== Statistics ==
=== Matches summary ===
As of 25 October 2026

Competition	Matches	Wins		Draws	Goals		Home wins		Home draws		Away wins		Other venue wins	
Competition	Matches	RMA	BAR	Draws	RMA	BAR	RMA	BAR	RMA	BAR	RMA	BAR	RMA	BAR
La Liga	193	81	77	35	311	313	57	53	15	20	24	24	0	0
Copa de la Coronación (Note: Although not recognized by the current Royal Spanish Football Federation as an official match, it is still considered a competitive match between Barcelona and Real Madrid by statistics sources and the media.)	1	0	1	0	1	3	0	0	0	0	0	0	0	1
Copa del Rey	38	13	17	8	71	71	5	7	5	3	4	6 (Note: Not including the 1968 Copa del Generalísimo final, which was held at Santiago Bernabéu and won by Barcelona, as it was technically a neutral venue.)	4	4
Copa de la Liga	6	0	2	4	8	13	0	1	2	2	0	1	0	0
Supercopa de España	19	10	7	2	42	32	6	4	1	1	2	0	2	3
UEFA Champions League	8	3	2	3	13	10	1	1	2	1	2	1	0	0
All competitions	265	107	106	52	446	442	69	66	25	27	32	32	6	8
Exhibition games	43	6	25	12	56	106	4	12	5	7	0	6	2	7
All matches	308	113	131	64	502	548	73	78	30	34	32	38	8	15

=== Head-to-head ranking in La Liga (1929–2026) ===
Barcelona's positions are marked with a red background, while Real Madrid's positions are marked with a purple background.

P.	29	30	31	32	33	34	35	36	40	41	42	43	44	45	46	47	48	49	50	51	52	53	54	55	56	57	58	59	60	61	62	63	64	65	66	67	68	69	70	71	72	73	74	75	76	77	78	79	80	81	82	83	84	85	86	87	88	89	90	91	92	93	94	95	96	97	98	99	00	01	02	03	04	05	06	07	08	09	10	11	12	13	14	15	16	17	18	19	20	21	22	23	24	25	26
1	1			1	1									1			1	1			1	1	1	1		1	1	1	1	1	1	1	1	1		1	1	1			1		1	1	1		1	1	1					1	1	1	1	1	1	1	1	1	1	1		1	1	1		1		1		1	1	1	1	1	1	1	1	1		1	1	1	1	1	1		1	1	1	1	1
2	2	2				2	2	2			2			2	2								2	2	2			2	2		2		2		2	2	2			2		2			2	2	2			2	2	2	2		2	2		2			2	2				2		2	2				2	2	2	2		2	2	2	2	2	2	2	2	2			2	2	2	2	2	2	2
3				3								3						3			3	3			3	3	3								3			3			3			3							3		3						3	3					3						3						3						3				3	3		3					
4			4		4				4	4					4	4			4	4										4									4	4		4							4			4											4	4			4			4	4		4																						
5		5						5											5																													5		5				5															5																										
6			6				6			6			6																			6		6					6																		6								6							6																							
7													7			7																																																																															
8																																											8																																																				
9						9			9											9																										9																																																	
10												10																																																																																			
11																	11																																																																														
12											12																																																																																				
13																																																																																															
14																																																																																															
15																																																																																															
16																																																																																															
17																																																																																															
18																																																																																															
19																																																																																															
20																																																																																															
21																																																																																															
22																																																																																															

- Total: Real Madrid with 48 higher finishes, Barcelona with 47 higher finishes (as of the end of the 2025–26 season).
- The biggest difference in positions for Real Madrid from Barcelona is 10 places in the 1941–42 season; the biggest difference in positions for Barcelona from Real Madrid is 10 places in the 1947–48 season.

=== Hat-tricks ===
25 players have scored a hat-trick in official El Clásico matches.

No.	Player	For	Score	Date	Competition	Stadium
1	(Spain) Santiago Bernabéu	Real Madrid	4–1 (H)	2 April 1916	1916 Copa del Rey	Campo de O'Donnell
2	(Spain) Luis Belaunde	Real Madrid	6–6 (N)	13 April 1916	1916 Copa del Rey	Campo de O'Donnell (Atlético Madrid)
3	(Spain) Paulino Alcántara	Barcelona	6–6 (N)	13 April 1916	1916 Copa del Rey	Campo de O'Donnell (Atlético Madrid)
4	(Spain) Santiago Bernabéu	Real Madrid	6–6 (N)	13 April 1916	1916 Copa del Rey	Campo de O'Donnell (Atlético Madrid)
5	(Spain) Josep Samitier^{4}	Barcelona	1–5 (A)	18 April 1926	1926 Copa del Rey	Estadio Chamartín
6	(Spain) Jaime Lazcano	Real Madrid	5–1 (H)	30 March 1930	1929–30 La Liga	Estadio Chamartín
7	(Spain) Juan Ramón	Barcelona	3–1 (H)	5 April 1931	1930–31 La Liga	Camp de Les Corts
8	(Spain) Jaime Lazcano	Real Madrid	8–2 (H)	3 February 1935	1934–35 La Liga	Estadio Chamartín
9	(Spain) Ildefonso Sañudo^{4}	Real Madrid	8–2 (H)	3 February 1935	1934–35 La Liga	Estadio Chamartín
10	(Spain) Martí Ventolrà^{4}	Barcelona	5–0 (H)	21 April 1935	1934–35 La Liga	Camp de Les Corts
11	(Spain) Pruden	Real Madrid	11–1 (H)	13 June 1943	1943 Copa del Generalísimo	Estadio Chamartín
12	(Spain) Sabino Barinaga^{4}	Real Madrid	11–1 (H)	13 June 1943	1943 Copa del Generalísimo	Estadio Chamartín
13	(Spain) Pahiño	Real Madrid	6–1 (H)	18 September 1949	1949–50 La Liga	Estadio Real Madrid Club de Fútbol
14	(Spain) Jesús Narro	Real Madrid	4–1 (H)	14 January 1951	1950–51 La Liga	Estadio Real Madrid Club de Fútbol
15	(Spain) César Rodríguez	Barcelona	4–2 (H)	2 March 1952	1951–52 La Liga	Camp de Les Corts
16	(Paraguay) Eulogio Martínez^{4}	Barcelona	6–1 (H)	19 May 1957	1957 Copa del Generalísimo	Camp de Les Corts
17	(Brazil) Evaristo	Barcelona	4–0 (H)	26 October 1958	1958–59 La Liga	Camp Nou
18	(Hungary) Ferenc Puskás	Real Madrid	1–5 (A)	27 January 1963	1962–63 La Liga	Camp Nou
19	(Hungary) Ferenc Puskás	Real Madrid	4–0 (H)	30 March 1964	1963–64 La Liga	Santiago Bernabéu
20	(Spain) Amancio	Real Madrid	4–1 (H)	8 November 1964	1964–65 La Liga	Santiago Bernabéu
21	(England) Gary Lineker	Barcelona	3–2 (H)	31 January 1987	1986–87 La Liga	Camp Nou
22	(Brazil) Romário	Barcelona	5–0 (H)	8 January 1994	1993–94 La Liga	Camp Nou
23	(Chile) Iván Zamorano	Real Madrid	5–0 (H)	7 January 1995	1994–95 La Liga	Santiago Bernabéu
24	(Argentina) Lionel Messi	Barcelona	3–3 (H)	10 March 2007	2006–07 La Liga	Camp Nou
25	(Argentina) Lionel Messi	Barcelona	3–4 (A)	23 March 2014	2013–14 La Liga	Santiago Bernabéu
26	(Uruguay) Luis Suárez	Barcelona	5–1 (H)	28 October 2018	2018–19 La Liga	Camp Nou
27	(France) Karim Benzema	Real Madrid	0–4 (A)	5 April 2023	2022–23 Copa del Rey	Camp Nou
28	(Brazil) Vinícius Júnior	Real Madrid	4–1 (N)	14 January 2024	2023–24 Supercopa de España	KSU Stadium
29	(France) Kylian Mbappé	Real Madrid	4–3 (A)	11 May 2025	2024–25 La Liga	Estadi Olímpic Lluís Companys

Notes

- ^{4} = 4 goals scored; (H) = Home, (A) = Away, (N) = Neutral location; home team score listed first.
- Not including friendly matches.

=== Stadiums ===
As of 25 October 2026

Since the first match in 1902, official Clásico matches have been held in 18 stadiums, including 3 outside Spain. The following table shows the details of the stadiums that hosted the Clásico. Friendly matches are not included.

El Clásico stadiums
Stadium	Results			Notes	Competition(s)
Stadium	RMA	Draws	BAR	Notes	Competition(s)
Hipódromo de la Castellana	0	0	1	The first match in El Clásico's history was played on 13 May 1902 at the old horse racing track in Madrid. The occasion was the semi-final round of the Copa de la Coronación ("Coronation Cup") in honor of Alfonso XIII, the first official tournament ever played in Spain.	Copa de la Coronación (1)
Hipódromo de la Castellana	Total: 1			The first match in El Clásico's history was played on 13 May 1902 at the old horse racing track in Madrid. The occasion was the semi-final round of the Copa de la Coronación ("Coronation Cup") in honor of Alfonso XIII, the first official tournament ever played in Spain.	Copa de la Coronación (1)
Camp del carrer Muntaner	0	0	1	Although it was Espanyol's stadium at the time, it hosted the first leg of the 1916 Copa del Rey semi-finals.	Copa del Rey (1)
Camp del carrer Muntaner	Total: 1			Although it was Espanyol's stadium at the time, it hosted the first leg of the 1916 Copa del Rey semi-finals.	Copa del Rey (1)
Campo de O'Donnell	1	0	0	The home stadium of Real Madrid (1912–1923).	Copa del Rey (1)
Campo de O'Donnell	Total: 1			The home stadium of Real Madrid (1912–1923).	Copa del Rey (1)
Campo de O'Donnell	1	1	0	The home stadium of Atlético Madrid (1913–1923), where two matches were held to determine the qualification for the Copa del Rey final in 1916. It should not be confused with the Real Madrid stadium at that time of the same name.	Copa del Rey (2)
Campo de O'Donnell	Total: 2			The home stadium of Atlético Madrid (1913–1923), where two matches were held to determine the qualification for the Copa del Rey final in 1916. It should not be confused with the Real Madrid stadium at that time of the same name.	Copa del Rey (2)
Chamartín	12	1	4	The home stadium of Real Madrid (1924–1946).	Copa del Rey/Copa del Generalísimo (2); La Liga (15)
Chamartín	Total: 17			The home stadium of Real Madrid (1924–1946).	Copa del Rey/Copa del Generalísimo (2); La Liga (15)
Camp de Les Corts	7	5	18	The home stadium of Barcelona (1922–1957), where the first El Clásico match in La Liga history was held.	Copa del Rey/Copa del Generalísimo (4); La Liga (26)
Camp de Les Corts	Total: 30			The home stadium of Barcelona (1922–1957), where the first El Clásico match in La Liga history was held.	Copa del Rey/Copa del Generalísimo (4); La Liga (26)
Mestalla	3	0	1	The home stadium of Valencia since 1923, where Real Madrid and Barcelona faced each other in four Copa del Rey finals: 1936, 1990, 2011 and 2014.	Copa del Rey/Copa del Presidente de la República (4)
Mestalla	Total: 4			The home stadium of Valencia since 1923, where Real Madrid and Barcelona faced each other in four Copa del Rey finals: 1936, 1990, 2011 and 2014.	Copa del Rey/Copa del Presidente de la República (4)
Metropolitano de Madrid	1	1	0	The home stadium of Atlético Madrid (1923–1936, 1943–1966), which hosted two league matches when Real Madrid temporarily used it as their home stadium in the 1946–47 season and the first half of the 1947–48 season, while the club was facilitating the construction of the Estadio Real Madrid Club de Fútbol (now Bernabéu Stadium) and the subsequent move there.	La Liga (2)
Metropolitano de Madrid	Total: 2			The home stadium of Atlético Madrid (1923–1936, 1943–1966), which hosted two league matches when Real Madrid temporarily used it as their home stadium in the 1946–47 season and the first half of the 1947–48 season, while the club was facilitating the construction of the Estadio Real Madrid Club de Fútbol (now Bernabéu Stadium) and the subsequent move there.	La Liga (2)
Bernabéu	53	22	29	The home stadium of Real Madrid since 1947, it hosted more El Clásico matches than any other stadium so far.	La Liga (78); Copa del Rey/Copa del Generalísimo (12); Copa de la Liga (3); Supercopa de España (7); European Cup/Champions League (4)
Bernabéu	Total: 104			The home stadium of Real Madrid since 1947, it hosted more El Clásico matches than any other stadium so far.	La Liga (78); Copa del Rey/Copa del Generalísimo (12); Copa de la Liga (3); Supercopa de España (7); European Cup/Champions League (4)
Camp Nou	24	22	46	The home stadium of Barcelona since 1958.	La Liga (69); Copa del Rey/Copa del Generalísimo (9); Copa de la Liga (3); Supercopa de España (7); European Cup/Champions League (4)
Camp Nou	Total: 92			The home stadium of Barcelona since 1958.	La Liga (69); Copa del Rey/Copa del Generalísimo (9); Copa de la Liga (3); Supercopa de España (7); European Cup/Champions League (4)
Vicente Calderón	1	0	0	The home stadium of Atlético Madrid (1966–2017), where the 1974 Copa del Generalísimo final was held.	Copa del Generalísimo (1)
Vicente Calderón	Total: 1			The home stadium of Atlético Madrid (1966–2017), where the 1974 Copa del Generalísimo final was held.	Copa del Generalísimo (1)
La Romareda	0	0	1	The home stadium of Zaragoza since 1957, where the 1983 Copa del Rey final was held.	Copa del Rey (1)
La Romareda	Total: 1			The home stadium of Zaragoza since 1957, where the 1983 Copa del Rey final was held.	Copa del Rey (1)
Alfredo Di Stéfano	1	0	0	Real Madrid's temporary stadium (2020–2021), which the club used due to the COVID-19 pandemic and to facilitate the ongoing renovations of the Santiago Bernabéu.	La Liga (1)
Alfredo Di Stéfano	Total: 1			Real Madrid's temporary stadium (2020–2021), which the club used due to the COVID-19 pandemic and to facilitate the ongoing renovations of the Santiago Bernabéu.	La Liga (1)
King Fahd International Stadium	1	0	1	The first stadium outside of Spain to host an El Clásico match, as part of the Supercopa de España.	Supercopa de España (2)
King Fahd International Stadium	Total: 2			The first stadium outside of Spain to host an El Clásico match, as part of the Supercopa de España.	Supercopa de España (2)
Olímpic Lluís Companys	1	0	1	Barcelona's temporary stadium (2023–2025), used by the club to facilitate the renovation of Camp Nou.	La Liga (2)
Olímpic Lluís Companys	Total: 2			Barcelona's temporary stadium (2023–2025), used by the club to facilitate the renovation of Camp Nou.	La Liga (2)
King Saud University Stadium	1	0	0	The second stadium outside of Spain to host an El Clásico match, as part of the Supercopa de España.	Supercopa de España (1)
King Saud University Stadium	Total: 1			The second stadium outside of Spain to host an El Clásico match, as part of the Supercopa de España.	Supercopa de España (1)
King Abdullah Sports City	0	0	2	The third stadium outside of Spain to host an El Clásico match, as part of the Supercopa de España.	Supercopa de España (2)
King Abdullah Sports City	Total: 2			The third stadium outside of Spain to host an El Clásico match, as part of the Supercopa de España.	Supercopa de España (2)
La Cartuja	0	0	1	The stadium where the 2025 Copa del Rey final was held.	Copa del Rey (1)
La Cartuja	Total: 1			The stadium where the 2025 Copa del Rey final was held.	Copa del Rey (1)

== Records ==
- Friendly matches are not included in the following records unless otherwise noted.

=== Results ===
==== Biggest wins (5+ goals) ====
Winning margin	Result	Date	Competition
10	Real Madrid 11–1 Barcelona	19 June 1943	Copa del Rey
6	Real Madrid 8–2 Barcelona	3 February 1935	La Liga
5	Barcelona 7–2 Real Madrid	24 September 1950	La Liga
5	Barcelona 6–1 Real Madrid	19 May 1957	Copa del Rey
5	Real Madrid 6–1 Barcelona	18 September 1949	La Liga
5	Barcelona 5–0 Real Madrid	21 April 1935	La Liga
5	Barcelona 5–0 Real Madrid	25 March 1945	La Liga
5	Real Madrid 5–0 Barcelona	5 October 1953	La Liga
5	Real Madrid 0–5 Barcelona	17 February 1974	La Liga
5	Barcelona 5–0 Real Madrid	8 January 1994	La Liga
5	Real Madrid 5–0 Barcelona	7 January 1995	La Liga
5	Barcelona 5–0 Real Madrid	29 November 2010	La Liga

==== Most goals in a match ====
Goals	Result	Date	Competition
12	Real Madrid 6–6 Barcelona	13 April 1916	Copa del Rey
12	Real Madrid 11–1 Barcelona	13 June 1943	Copa del Rey
10	Real Madrid 8–2 Barcelona	3 February 1935	La Liga
10	Barcelona 5–5 Real Madrid	10 January 1943	La Liga
9	Barcelona 7–2 Real Madrid	24 September 1950	La Liga
8	Barcelona 3–5 Real Madrid	4 December 1960	La Liga
8	Real Madrid 2–6 Barcelona	2 May 2009	La Liga

==== Longest runs ====
===== Most consecutive wins =====
Games	Club	Period
7	Real Madrid	22 April 1962 – 28 February 1965
5	Barcelona	13 December 2008 – 29 November 2010
5	Real Madrid	1 March 2020 – 20 March 2022

===== Most consecutive draws =====
Games	Period
3	1 May 2002 – 20 April 2003

===== Most consecutive matches without a draw =====
Games	Period
22	1 March 2020 – 25 October 2026 (ongoing)
16	25 January 1948 – 21 November 1954
15	23 November 1960 – 19 March 1967
12	4 December 1977 – 26 March 1983
11	19 May 1957 – 27 April 1960
9	5 March 1933 – 28 January 1940

===== Longest undefeated runs =====
Games	Club	Period
8	Real Madrid	3 March 2001 – 6 December 2003
7	Real Madrid	31 January 1932 – 3 February 1935
7	Real Madrid	22 April 1962 – 18 February 1965
7	Barcelona	27 April 2011 – 25 January 2012
7	Barcelona	23 December 2017 – 18 December 2019

===== Longest undefeated runs in the league =====
Games	Club	Period
7 (6 wins)	Barcelona	13 December 2008 – 10 December 2011
7 (5 wins)	Real Madrid	31 January 1932 – 3 February 1935
7 (4 wins)	Barcelona	3 December 2016 – 18 December 2019
6 (6 wins)	Real Madrid	30 September 1962 – 28 February 1965
6 (4 wins)	Barcelona	11 May 1997 – 13 October 1999
6 (3 wins)	Barcelona	28 November 1971 – 17 February 1974
5 (4 wins)	Barcelona	30 March 1947 – 15 January 1949
5 (4 wins)	Real Madrid	18 December 2019 – 24 October 2021
5 (3 wins)	Barcelona	11 May 1975 – 30 January 1977
5 (3 wins)	Real Madrid	1 April 2006 – 7 May 2008

===== Most consecutive matches without conceding a goal =====
Games	Club	Period
5	Barcelona	3 April 1972 – 17 February 1974
3	Real Madrid	29 June 1974 – 11 May 1975
3	Barcelona	29 November 2009 – 29 November 2010
3	Barcelona	27 February 2019 – 18 December 2019

===== Most consecutive games scoring =====
Games	Club	Period
24	Barcelona	27 April 2011 – 13 August 2017
21	Barcelona	30 November 1980 – 31 January 1987
18	Real Madrid	3 May 2011 – 22 March 2015
13	Real Madrid	1 December 1946 – 23 November 1952
13	Real Madrid	15 February 1959 – 21 January 1962
13	Real Madrid	22 April 1962 – 9 April 1968
12	Real Madrid	5 December 1990 – 16 December 1993
10	Barcelona	11 September 1991 – 7 May 1994
10	Barcelona	30 January 1997 – 13 October 1999

=== Players ===
As of 10 May 2026

==== Goalscoring ====
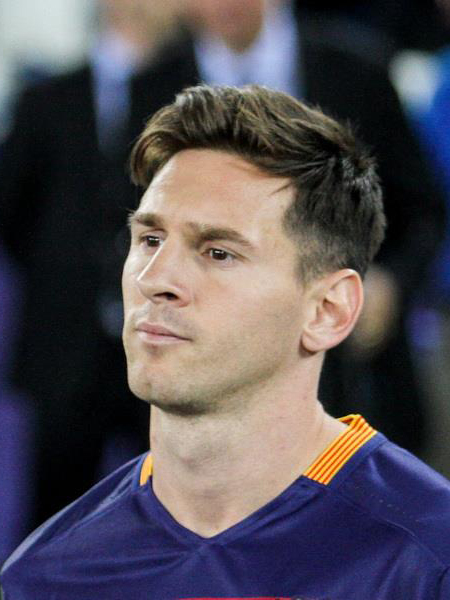
Lionel Messi is the all-time top scorer in El Clásico history with 26 goals.

===== Top goalscorers =====
- Does not include friendly matches.

Rank	Player	Club	La Liga	Copa	Supercopa	League Cup	Europe	Total
1	(Argentina) Lionel Messi	Barcelona	18	—	6	—	2	26
2	(Argentina) (Spain) Alfredo Di Stéfano	Real Madrid	14	2	—	—	2	18
2	(Portugal) Cristiano Ronaldo	Real Madrid	9	5	4	—	—	18
4	(France) Karim Benzema	Real Madrid	8	4	4	—	—	16
5	(Spain) Raúl	Real Madrid	11	—	3	—	1	15
6	(Spain) César	Barcelona	12	2	—	—	—	14
6	(Spain) Paco Gento	Real Madrid	10	2	—	—	2	14
6	(Hungary) (Spain) Ferenc Puskás	Real Madrid	9	2	—	—	3	14
9	(Spain) Santillana	Real Madrid	9	2	—	1	—	12
10	(Uruguay) Luis Suárez	Barcelona	9	2	—	—	—	11

===== Top scorers by competition =====
Competition	Player	Club	Goals
La Liga	(Argentina) Lionel Messi	Barcelona	18
Copa del Rey	(Spain) Santiago Bernabéu	Real Madrid	7
Supercopa de España	(Argentina) Lionel Messi	Barcelona	6
European Cup / UEFA Champions League	(Hungary) (Spain) Ferenc Puskás	Real Madrid	3
Copa de la Coronación	(Germany) Udo Steinberg	Barcelona	2
Copa de la Liga	(Argentina) Diego Maradona	Barcelona	2
Copa de la Liga	(Spain) Juanito	Real Madrid	2
Copa de la Liga	(Spain) Paco Clos	Barcelona	2
Copa de la Liga	(Argentina) Jorge Valdano	Real Madrid	2

===== Consecutive goalscoring =====
Player	Club	Consecutive matches	Total goals in the run	Start	End
(Portugal) Cristiano Ronaldo	Real Madrid	6	7	2011–12 Copa del Rey (quarter-finals 1st leg)	2012–13 La Liga (7th round)
(Spain) Quini	Barcelona	5	6	1980–81 La Liga (13th round)	1983–84 La Liga (8th round)
(Chile) Iván Zamorano	Real Madrid	5	5	1992–93 La Liga (20th round)	1993 Supercopa de España (2nd leg)
(France) Kylian Mbappé	Real Madrid	4	6	2025 Supercopa de España final	2025–26 La Liga (10th round)
(Spain) Vicente Martínez	Barcelona	4	5	1916 Copa del Rey (semi-finals 1st leg)	1916 Copa del Rey (semi-finals 2nd replay)
(Spain) Simón Lecue	Real Madrid	4	5	1935–36 La Liga (7th round)	1939–40 La Liga (9th round)
(Brazil) Ronaldinho	Barcelona	4	5	2004–05 La Liga (12th round)	2005–06 La Liga (31st round)
(Brazil) Giovanni	Barcelona	4	4	1997 Supercopa de España (1st leg)	1997–98 La Liga (28th round)

==== Most appearances ====
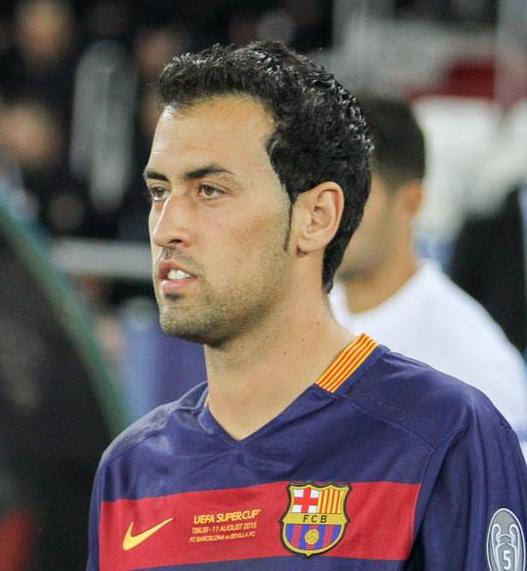
Sergio Busquets has made the most appearances in El Clásico, with 48.

Apps	Player	Club
48	Sergio Busquets	Barcelona
45	Lionel Messi	Barcelona
45	Sergio Ramos	Real Madrid
43	Karim Benzema	Real Madrid
42	Paco Gento	Real Madrid
42	Manuel Sanchís	Real Madrid
42	Xavi	Barcelona
40	Gerard Piqué	Barcelona
38	Andrés Iniesta	Barcelona
38	Luka Modrić	Real Madrid
37	Iker Casillas	Real Madrid
37	Fernando Hierro	Real Madrid
37	Raúl	Real Madrid
35	Santillana	Real Madrid

==== Goalkeeping ====
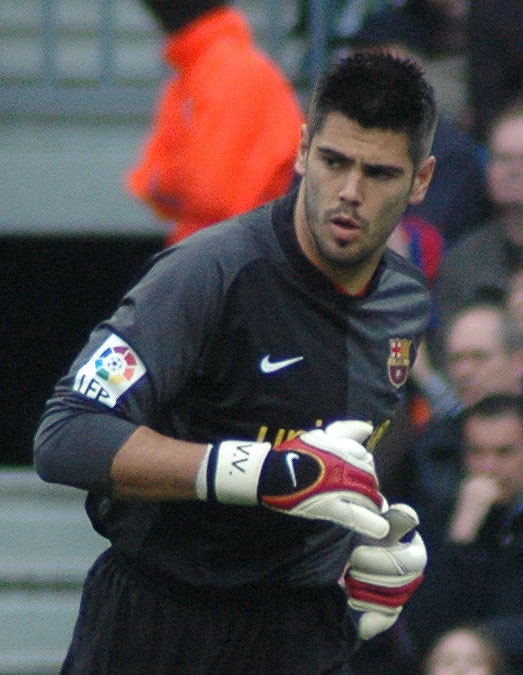
Víctor Valdés has the most clean sheets in El Clásico with seven.

===== Most clean sheets =====
Player	Club	Period	Total
(Spain) Víctor Valdés	Barcelona	2002–2014	7
(Spain) Andoni Zubizarreta	Barcelona	1986–1994	6
(Spain) Francisco Buyo	Real Madrid	1986–1997	6
(Germany) Marc-André ter Stegen	Barcelona	2014–present	6
(Spain) Iker Casillas	Real Madrid	1999–2015	6

===== Consecutive clean sheets =====
Player	Club	Consecutive clean sheets	Start	End
(Spain) Miguel Reina	Barcelona	3	1971–72 La Liga (28th round)	1972–73 La Liga (22nd round)
(Spain) Víctor Valdés	Barcelona	3	2009–10 La Liga (12th round)	2010–11 La Liga (13th round)
(Germany) Marc-André ter Stegen	Barcelona	3	2018–19 Copa del Rey (semi-finals 2nd leg)	2019–20 La Liga (10th round)

==== Assists ====
- Most assists: 14 – (Argentina) Lionel Messi (Note: Nine in La Liga, three in Copa del Rey and two in Supercopa de España)
- Most assists in one match: 4
  - (Hungary) László Kubala (21 February 1954, La Liga)
  - (Spain) Xavi (2 May 2009, La Liga)
- Most assists in one season: 5
  - (Argentina) Diego Maradona (1982–83) (Note: Three in La Liga, one in Copa del Rey final and one in Copa de la Liga)
  - (Argentina) Lionel Messi (2011–12) (Note: One in La Liga, two in Copa del Rey and two in Supercopa de España)

==== Disciplinary ====
- Most yellow cards: 22 – (Spain) Sergio Ramos
- Most red cards: 5 – (Spain) Sergio Ramos

==== Other records ====
- Most penalties scored: 6 – (Argentina) Lionel Messi
- Most direct free kicks scored: 2
  - (Netherlands) Ronald Koeman (1991–92 La Liga & 1993–94 La Liga)
  - (Argentina) Lionel Messi (2012 Supercopa de España & 2012–13 La Liga)
- Most matches won: 23 – (Spain) Sergio Busquets
- Most consecutive matches won: 8
  - (France) Lucien Muller, 30 September 1962 – 27 March 1966 (six wins with Real Madrid, two with Barcelona)
  - (Spain) Pachín, 22 April 1962 – 20 November 1966
- Most matches lost: 20 – (Spain) Sergio Ramos
- Most hat-tricks: 2
  - (Spain) Santiago Bernabéu (both in 1916 Copa del Rey)
  - (Spain) Jaime Lazcano (1929–30 La Liga & 1934–35 La Liga)
  - (Hungary) Ferenc Puskás (1962–63 La Liga & 1963–64 La Liga)
  - (Argentina) Lionel Messi (2006–07 La Liga & 2013–14 La Liga)
- Youngest player: 16 years, 107 days – (Spain) Lamine Yamal, 2023–24 La Liga, 28 October 2023
- Oldest player: 39 years, 244 days – (Croatia) Luka Modrić, 2024–25 La Liga, 11 May 2025
- Youngest scorer: 17 years, 105 days – (Spain) Lamine Yamal, 2024–25 La Liga, 26 October 2024
- Oldest scorer: 37 years, 164 days – (Argentina) (Spain) Alfredo Di Stéfano, 1963–64 La Liga, 15 December 1963
- Fastest goal: 21 seconds – (France) Karim Benzema, 2011–12 La Liga, 10 December 2011
- Fastest penalty scored: 2 minutes – (Spain) Pirri, 1976–77 La Liga, 30 January 1977
- Most different tournaments scored in: 4 – (Spain) Pedro (La Liga, UEFA Champions League, Copa del Rey and Supercopa de España)
- Most seasons scored in: 11 – (Spain) Paco Gento (1954–55, 1958–59, 1959–60, 1960–61, 1961–62, 1962–63, 1963–64, 1965–66, 1967–68, 1968–69 and 1969–70)
- Most goals in one season: 7 – (Spain) Santiago Bernabéu (1915–16)
- Most different stadiums scored in: 5 – (Brazil) Vinícius Júnior (Santiago Bernabéu, Camp Nou, King Fahd International Stadium, KSU Stadium and King Abdullah Sports City)
- Four players scored for both clubs in El Clásico:
  - (Spain) Josep Samitier (in 1925–26 and 1931–32 for Barcelona and in 1932–33 and 1933–34 for Madrid FC)
  - (Spain) Luís Enrique (in 1994–95 for Real Madrid and in 1997–98, 1998–99, 2000–01 and 2002–03 for Barcelona)
  - (Portugal) Luís Figo (in 1995–96, 1997–98 and 1999–2000 for Barcelona and in 2001–02 for Real Madrid)
  - (Brazil) Ronaldo (in 1996–97 for Barcelona and in 2002–03, 2003–04, 2004–05 and 2005–06 for Real Madrid)

=== Managers ===
==== Most appearances ====
Rank	Manager	Team	Matches	Years	Competition(s) (matches)
1	(Spain) Miguel Muñoz	Real Madrid	36	1960–1974	La Liga (27); Copa del Rey (5); European Cup (4)
2	(Netherlands) Johan Cruyff	Barcelona	25	1988–1996	La Liga (16); Copa del Rey (3); Supercopa de España (6)
3	(Italy) Carlo Ancelotti	Real Madrid	20	2013–2015; 2021–2025	La Liga (12); Copa del Rey (4); Supercopa de España (4)
4	(Portugal) José Mourinho	Real Madrid	18	2010–2013; 2026–present	La Liga (7); Copa del Rey (5); Supercopa de España (4); UEFA Champions League (2)
5	(Spain) Pep Guardiola	Barcelona	15	2008–2012	La Liga (8); Copa del Rey (3); Supercopa de España (2); UEFA Champions League (2)
6	(Netherlands) Rinus Michels	Barcelona	13	1971–1975; 1976–1978	La Liga (12); Copa del Rey (1)
7	(England) Terry Venables	Barcelona	12	1984–1987	La Liga (8); Copa de la Liga (4)
8	(Netherlands) Leo Beenhakker	Real Madrid	11	1986–1989; 1992	La Liga (9); Supercopa de España (2)
8	(France) Zinedine Zidane	Real Madrid	11	2016–2018; 2019–2021	La Liga (9); Supercopa de España (2)

==== Most wins ====
Rank	Manager	Club	Period	Wins
1	(Spain) Miguel Muñoz	Real Madrid	1960–1974	16
2	(Netherlands) Johan Cruyff	Barcelona	1988–1996	9
2	(Spain) Pep Guardiola	Barcelona	2008–2012	9
2	(Italy) Carlo Ancelotti	Real Madrid	2013–2015; 2021–2025	9
5	(England) Terry Venables	Barcelona	1984–1987	6
5	(Portugal) José Mourinho	Real Madrid	2010–2013; 2026–present	6
5	(France) Zinedine Zidane	Real Madrid	2016–2018; 2019–2021	6
5	(Germany) Hansi Flick	Barcelona	2024–present	6

== General performances ==
=== General information ===
	Real Madrid	Barcelona
Club name after establishment	Madrid Football Club	Foot-Ball Club Barcelona
Founding date	6 March 1902	29 November 1899
Number of members	95,612 (as of 24 November 2024)	150,317 (as of 31 May 2023)
Stadium	Bernabéu	Camp Nou
Capacity	83,186	62,652
Number of seasons in La Liga	96 (never been relegated)	
Most goals scored in a season in La Liga	121 (2011–12)	116 (2016–17)
Most points in a season in La Liga	100 (2011–12)	100 (2012–13)
Number of Double wins (La Liga and Copa del Rey)	4 (Note: 1961–62, 1974–75, 1979–80, 1988–89)	9 (Note: 1951–52, 1952–53, 1958–59, 1997–98, 2008–09, 2014–15, 2015–16, 2017–18, 2024–25)
Number of Double wins (La Liga and UEFA Champions League)	5 (Note: 1956–57, 1957–58, 2016–17, 2021–22, 2023–24)	5 (Note: 1991–92, 2005–06, 2008–09, 2010–11, 2014–15)
Number of Treble wins (La Liga, Copa del Rey and UEFA Champions League)	0	2 (Note: 2008–09, 2014–15)

=== Honours ===
The rivalry reflected in El Clásico matches comes about as Barcelona and Real Madrid are the most successful football clubs in Spain. As seen below, Real Madrid leads Barcelona 106 to 104 in terms of official overall trophies. Copa Eva Duarte is not listed as an official title by UEFA, but it is considered as such by the Royal Spanish Football Federation as it is the direct predecessor of the Supercopa de España. While the Inter-Cities Fairs Cup is recognised as the predecessor to the UEFA Cup, and the Latin Cup is recognised as one of the predecessors of the European Cup, both were not organised by UEFA. Consequently, UEFA does not consider clubs' records in the Fairs Cup nor Latin Cup to be part of their European record. However, FIFA does view the competitions as a major honour. The one-off Ibero-American Cup was later recognised as an official tournament organised by CONMEBOL and the Royal Spanish Football Federation.

The only times a match between the two clubs in La Liga mathematically secured the title for either side were in the 1931–32 season (Real Madrid's first-ever title) and in the 2025–26 season (Barcelona's 29th title).

- Numbers with this background indicate the record in the competition.

Barcelona	Competition	Real Madrid
Domestic
29	La Liga	36
32	Copa del Rey	20
16	Supercopa de España	13
3	Copa Eva Duarte (defunct)	1
2	Copa de la Liga (defunct)	1
82	Aggregate	71
European
5	UEFA Champions League	15
4	UEFA Cup Winners' Cup (defunct)	—
—	UEFA Europa League	2
5	UEFA Super Cup	6
3	Inter-Cities Fairs Cup (defunct)	—
2	Latin Cup (defunct)	2
19	Aggregate	25
Worldwide
—	Ibero-American Cup (defunct)	1
—	Intercontinental Cup (defunct)	3
3	FIFA Club World Cup	5
—	FIFA Intercontinental Cup	1
3	Aggregate	10
104	Total aggregate	106

=== Awards ===
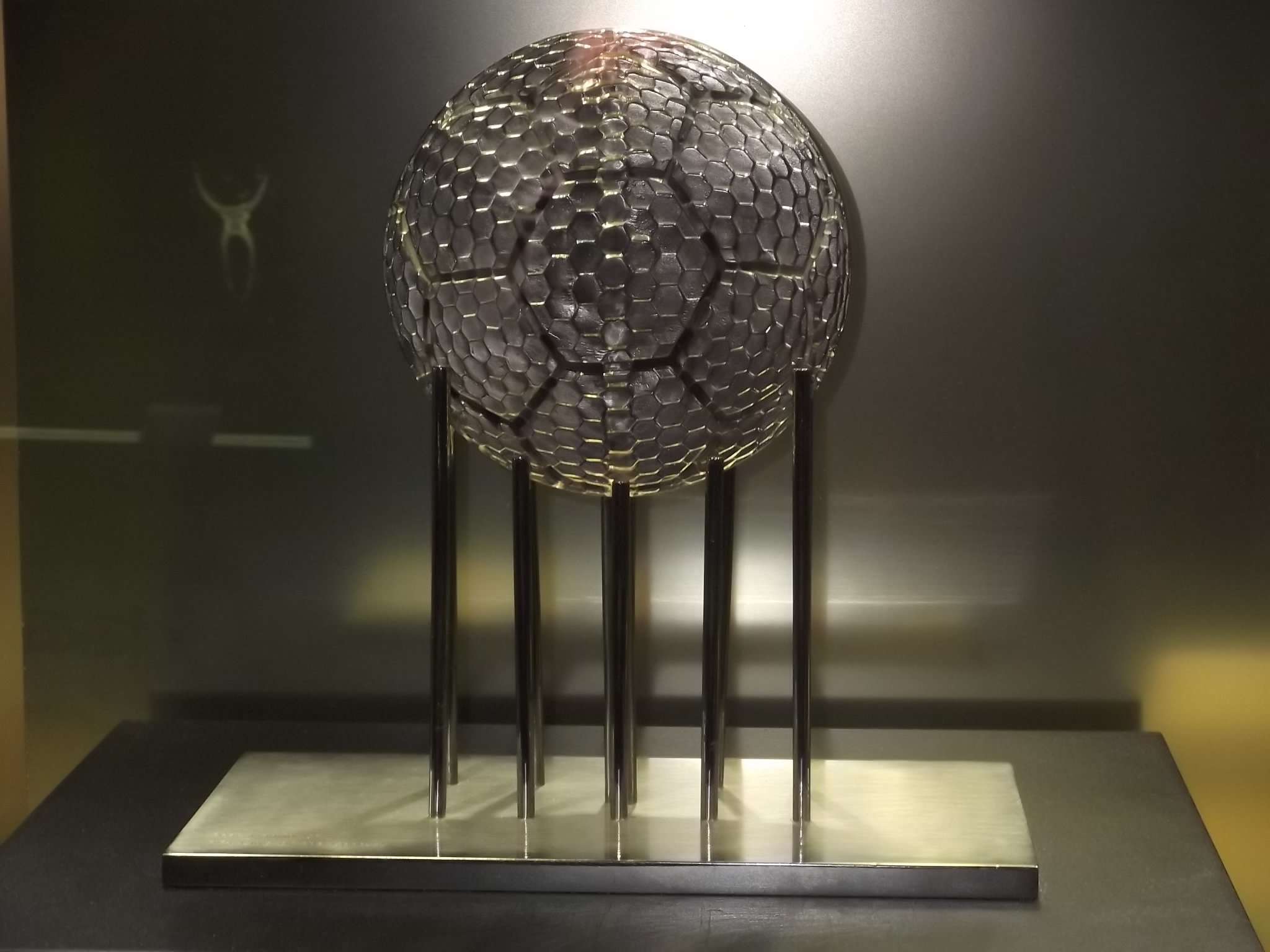
FIFA Club of the Century trophy, exhibited at the Real Madrid Museum

==== FIFA Club of the Century ====
FIFA Club of the Century was an award presented by FIFA to decide the best football club of the 20th century.

	Real Madrid	Barcelona
Position	1st	4th
Vote percentage	42.35 %	5.61%

==== Ballon d'Or ====
The Ballon d'Or is an annual football award presented by French news magazine France Football since 1956. Between 2010 and 2015, in an agreement with FIFA, the award was known as the FIFA Ballon d'Or.

Rank	Real Madrid	Barcelona
Ballon d'Or (1956–2009, 2016–present) / FIFA Ballon d'Or (2010–2015)
Winner	12 (Note: Alfredo Di Stéfano (1957, 1959), Raymond Kopa (1958), Luís Figo (2000), Ronaldo (2002), Fabio Cannavaro (2006), Cristiano Ronaldo (2013, 2014, 2016, 2017), Luka Modrić (2018), Karim Benzema (2022))	12 (Note: Luis Suárez (1960), Johan Cruyff (1973, 1974), Hristo Stoichkov (1994), Rivaldo (1999), Ronaldinho (2005), Lionel Messi (2009, 2010, 2011, 2012, 2015, 2019))
Second place	13 (Note: Alfredo Di Stéfano (1956), Raymond Kopa (1959), Ferenc Puskás (1960), Predrag Mijatović (1997), Davor Šuker (1998), Raul (2001), Roberto Carlos (2002), Cristiano Ronaldo (2009, 2011, 2012, 2015), Vinícius Júnior (2024), Kylian Mbappé (2026))	13 (Note: Hans Krankl (1978), Bernd Schuster (1980), Gary Lineker (1986), Hristo Stoichkov (1992), Ronaldo (1996), Deco (2004), Lionel Messi (2008, 2013, 2014, 2016, 2017), Andrés Iniesta (2010), Lamine Yamal (2025))
Third place	6 (Note: Raymond Kopa (1956, 1957), Amancio (1964), Emilio Butragueño (1986, 1987), Jude Bellingham (2024))	11 (Note: Johan Cruyff (1975), Bernd Schuster (1981, 1985), Ronaldinho (2004), Lionel Messi (2007), Xavi (2009, 2010, 2011), Andrés Iniesta (2012), Neymar (2015), Lamine Yamal (2026))
Total	31	36

==== The Best FIFA Football Awards ====
The Best FIFA Football Awards are presented annually by the sport's governing body, FIFA.

Award	Real Madrid	Barcelona
The Best FIFA Men's Player	4 (Note: Cristiano Ronaldo (2016, 2017), Luka Modrić (2018), Vinicius Junior (2024))	1 (Note: Lionel Messi (2019))
The Best FIFA Football Coach	2 (Note: Zinedine Zidane (2017), Carlo Ancelotti (2024))	0

==== UEFA Men's Player of the Year Award ====
The UEFA Men's Player of the Year Award is an award given to the footballer playing for a men's football club in Europe that is considered the best in the previous season of both club and national team competition. The award, created in 2011 by UEFA in partnership with European Sports Media (ESM) group, was initially aimed at reviving the European Footballer of the Year Award (Ballon d'Or).

Rank	Real Madrid	Barcelona
Winner	5 (Note: Cristiano Ronaldo (2013–14, 2015–16, 2016–17), Luka Modrić (2017–18), Karim Benzema (2021–22))	3 (Note: Lionel Messi (2010–11, 2014–15), Andrés Iniesta (2011–12))
Second place	1 (Note: Cristiano Ronaldo (2017–18))	6 (Note: Xavi (2010–11), Lionel Messi (2011–12, 2012–13, 2016–17, 2018–19), Luis Suárez (2014–15))
Third place	6 (Note: Cristiano Ronaldo (2010–11, 2011–12, 2012–13, 2014–15), Gareth Bale (2015–16), Thibaut Courtois (2021–22))	0
Total	12	9

==== FIFA World Player of the Year ====
The FIFA World Player of the Year was presented annually by the sport's governing body, FIFA, between 1991 and 2015 at the FIFA World Player Gala. Coaches and captains of international teams and media representatives selected the player they deem to have performed the best in the previous calendar year.

Rank	Real Madrid	Barcelona
Winner	4 (Note: Luís Figo (2001), Ronaldo (2002), Zinedine Zidane (2003), Fabio Cannavaro (2006))	6 (Note: Romário (1994), Ronaldo (1996), Rivaldo (1999), Ronaldinho (2004, 2005), Lionel Messi (2009))
Second place	3 (Note: Roberto Carlos (1997), Luís Figo (2000), Zinedine Zidane (2006))	5 (Note: Hristo Stoichkov (1992, 1994), Romário (1993), Lionel Messi (2007, 2008))
Third place	4 (Note: Davor Šuker (1998), Raúl (2001), Zinedine Zidane (2002), Ronaldo (2003))	4 (Note: Rivaldo (2000), Samuel Eto'o (2005), Ronaldinho (2006), Xavi (2009))
Total	11	15

==== Laureus World Sports Awards ====
The Laureus World Sports Awards is an annual award established in 1999 by Laureus Sport for Good Foundation founding patrons Daimler and Richemont. It recognises sporting achievements achieved throughout the year.

Award	Real Madrid	Barcelona
Team of the Year	1 (Note: 2025)	1 (Note: 2012)
Sportsman of the Year	0	1 (Note: Lionel Messi (2020))
Young Sportsperson of the Year	0	1 (Note: Lamine Yamal (2026))
Spirit of Sport	0	1 (Note: 2007)
Breakthrough	1 (Note: Jude Bellingham (2024))	1 (Note: Lamine Yamal (2025))
Total	2	5

==== League performances awards ====
Award	Real Madrid	Barcelona
Pichichi Trophy	30 (Note: Manuel Olivares (1932–33), Pahiño (1951–52), Alfredo Di Stéfano (1953–54, 1955–56, 1956–57, 1957–58, 1958–59), Ferenc Puskás (1959–60,1960–61, 1962–63, 1963–64), Amancio (1968–69, 1969–70), Juanito (1983–84), Hugo Sánchez (1985–86, 1986–87, 1987–88, 1989–90), Emilio Butragueño (1990–91), Iván Zamorano (1994–95), Raúl (1998–99, 2000–01), Ronaldo (2003–04), Ruud van Nistelrooy (2006–07), Cristiano Ronaldo (2010–11, 2013–14, 2014–15), Karim Benzema (2021–22), Kylian Mbappé (2024–25, 2025–26))	20 (Note: Mariano Martín (1942–43), César (1948–49), Cayetano Ré (1964–65), Carles Rexach (1970–71), Hans Krankl (1978–79), Quini (1980–81, 1981–82), Romário (1993–94), Ronaldo (1996–97), Samuel Eto'o (2005–06), Lionel Messi (2009–10, 2011–12, 2012–13, 2016–17, 2017–18, 2018–19, 2019–20, 2020–21), Luis Suárez (2015–16), Robert Lewandowski (2022–23))
Zamora Trophy	18 (Note: Ricardo Zamora (1931–32, 1932–33), José Bañón (1945–46), Juan Alonso (1954–55) José Vicente (1960–61, 1962–63, 1963–64), José Araquistáin (1961–62), Antonio Betancort (1964–65, 1966–67, 1967–68), García Remón (1972–73), Miguel Ángel (1975–76), Agustín Rodríguez (1982–83), Francisco Buyo (1987–88, 1991–92), Iker Casillas (2007–08), Thibaut Courtois (2019–20))	22 (Note: Juan Velasco (1947–48), Antoni Ramallets (1951–52, 1955–56, 1956–57, 1958–59, 1959–60), José Manuel Pesudo (1965–66), Salvador Sadurní (1968–69, 1973–74, 1974–75), Miguel Reina (1972–73), Pedro Artola (1977–78), Javier Urruticoechea (1983–84), Andoni Zubizarreta (1986–87), Víctor Valdés (2004–05, 2008–09, 2009–10, 2010–11, 2011–12), Claudio Bravo (2014–15), Marc-André ter Stegen (2022–23), Joan García (2025–26))
European Golden Shoe	5 (Note: Hugo Sánchez (1989–90), Cristiano Ronaldo (2010–11, 2013–14, 2014–15), Kylian Mbappé (2024–25))	8 (Note: Ronaldo (1996–97), Lionel Messi (2009–10, 2011–12, 2012–13, 2016–17, 2017–18, 2018–19), Luis Suárez (2015–16))
Trofeo Alfredo Di Stéfano	8 (Note: Raúl (2007–08), Cristiano Ronaldo (2011–12, 2012–13, 2013–14, 2015–16), Karim Benzema (2019–20, 2021–22), Jude Bellingham (2023–24))	9 (Note: Lionel Messi (2008–09, 2009–10, 2010–11, 2014–15, 2016–17, 2017–18, 2018–19), Marc-André ter Stegen (2022–23), Lamine Yamal (2024–25))

==== Other awards ====
Award	Real Madrid	Barcelona
Golden Boy	1 (Note: Jude Bellingham (2023))	5 (Note: Lionel Messi (2005), Pedri (2021), Gavi (2022), Lamine Yamal (2024), Pau Cubarsí (2026))
Kopa Trophy	1 (Note: Jude Bellingham (2023))	5 (Note: Pedri (2021), Gavi (2022), Lamine Yamal (2024, 2025, 2026))
Yashin Trophy	1 (Note: Thibaut Courtois (2022))	0
Onze d'Or	6 (Note: Zinedine Zidane (2001), Ronaldo (2002), Cristiano Ronaldo (2016–17), Karim Benzema (2020–21, 2021–22), Kylian Mbappé (2025–26))	9 (Note: Hristo Stoichkov (1992), Romário (1994), Ronaldo (1997), Rivaldo (1999), Ronaldinho (2005), Lionel Messi (2009, 2010–11, 2011–12, 2017–18))
Bravo Award	3 (Note: Emilio Butragueño (1985, 1986), Iker Casillas (2000))	4 (Note: Pep Guardiola (1992), Ronaldo (1997), Lionel Messi (2007), Sergio Busquets (2009))
World Soccer Award	9 (Note: Luís Figo (2000), Ronaldo (2002), Fabio Cannavaro (2006), Cristiano Ronaldo (2013, 2014, 2016, 2017), Luka Modrić (2018), Karim Benzema (2022))	11 (Note: Ronaldo (1996, 1997), Rivaldo (1999), Ronaldinho (2004, 2005), Xavi (2010), Lionel Messi (2009, 2011, 2012, 2015, 2019))

== Personnel at both clubs ==
=== Players ===
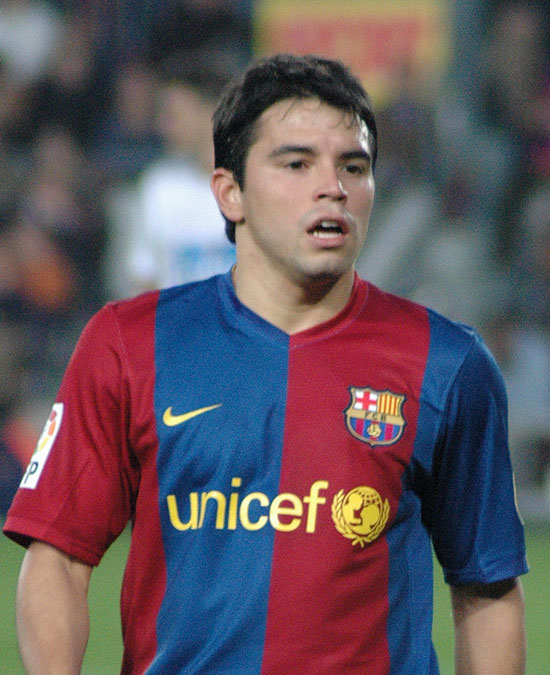
Javier Saviola was the most recent player to transfer directly between the two rivals, in 2007.

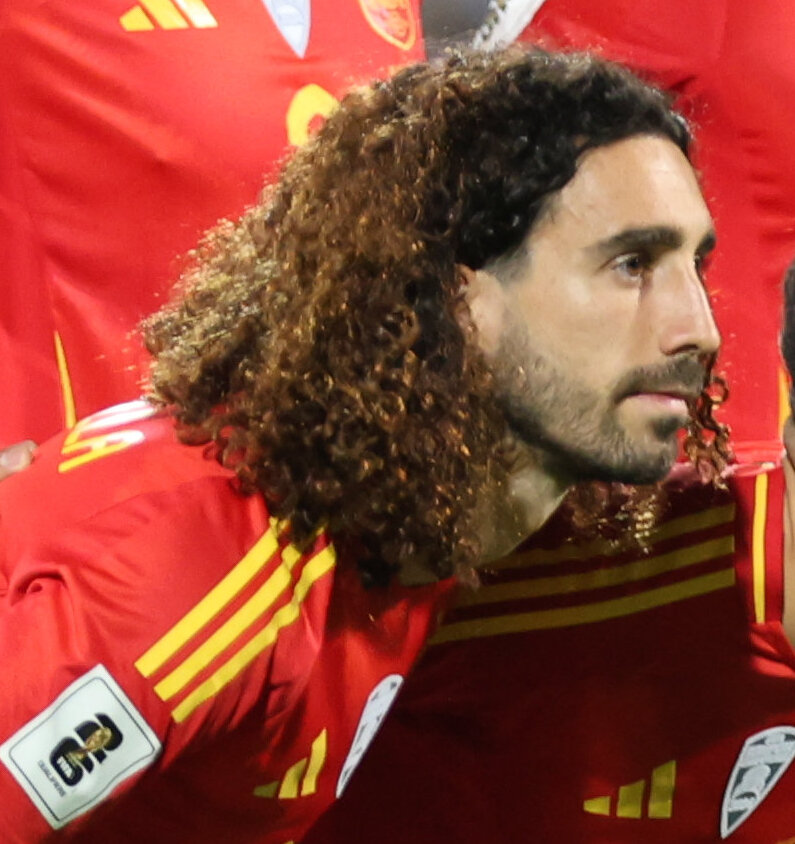
After signing for Real Madrid in 2026, Marc Cucurella became the most recent player to play for both clubs.

Barcelona to Real Madrid

- 1902: (Spain) Alfonso Albéniz (Note: Moved to Madrid for studying purposes and joined Real Madrid.)
- 1906: (Spain) José Quirante (Note: Only played for Real Madrid between 1906–1908 on loan from Barcelona, as he went to live in Madrid for working purposes.)
- 1908: (England) Charles Wallace (Note: Only played one game for Real Madrid in 1908 on loan from Barcelona, a common practice at the time when it was allowed to call up players from other teams. After that match, he continued to play for Barcelona.)
- 1911: (Spain) Arsenio Comamala
- 1913: (Germany) Walter Rozitsky
- 1930: (Spain) Ricardo Zamora (via Espanyol)
- 1932: (Spain) Josep Samitier
- 1949: (Spain) Joaquín Navarro (via Sabadell)
- 1950: (Spain) Alfonso Navarro (Note: He moved again from Real Madrid to Barcelona in 1954 (via Lleida, Osasuna and España Industrial).)
- 1959: (Hungary) László Kaszás (Note: Never played any official match for Barcelona or Real Madrid but signed with both teams.)
- 1961: (Spain) Justo Tejada
- 1962: (Brazil) Evaristo
- 1965: (Belgium) Fernand Goyvaerts
- 1988: (West Germany) Bernd Schuster
- 1990: (Spain) Luis Milla
- 1992: (Spain) Nando Muñoz
- 1994: (Denmark) Michael Laudrup
- 1995: (Spain) Miquel Soler (via Sevilla)
- 2000: (Portugal) Luís Figo
- 2000: (Spain) Albert Celades (via Celta Vigo)
- 2002: (Brazil) Ronaldo (via Inter Milan)
- 2007: (Argentina) Javier Saviola
- 2026: (Spain) Marc Cucurella (via Eibar, Getafe, Brighton & Hove Albion and Chelsea)

Real Madrid to Barcelona

- 1905: (Spain) Luciano Lizárraga (Note: Never played an official match for Barcelona.)
- 1909: (France) Enrique Normand (Note: Only played one match for Barcelona in the 1909 Copa del Rey on loan from Real Madrid, a common practice at the time when it was allowed to call up players from other teams. After that match, he continued to play for Real Madrid.)
- 1939: (Spain) Luis Junco (via Atlético Aviación)
- 1939: (Spain) Hilario (via Valencia)
- 1946: (Spain) Josep Canal
- 1961: (Spain) Chus Pereda (via Sevilla)
- 1965: (France) Lucien Muller
- 1980: (Spain) Amador Lorenzo (via Hércules)
- 1994: (Romania) Gheorghe Hagi (via Brescia)
- 1994: (Spain) Julen Lopetegui (via Logroñés)
- 1995: (Croatia) Robert Prosinečki
- 1996: (Spain) Luis Enrique
- 1999: (Spain) Dani García Lara (via Mallorca)
- 2000: (Spain) Alfonso Pérez (via Real Betis)
- 2004: (Cameroon) Samuel Eto'o (via Mallorca)
- 2022: (Spain) Marcos Alonso (via Bolton Wanderers, Fiorentina and Chelsea)

From Barcelona to Real Madrid	17
From Barcelona to another club before Real Madrid	6
Total	23
From Real Madrid to Barcelona	6
From Real Madrid to another club before Barcelona	10
Total	16
Total switches	39

=== Managers ===
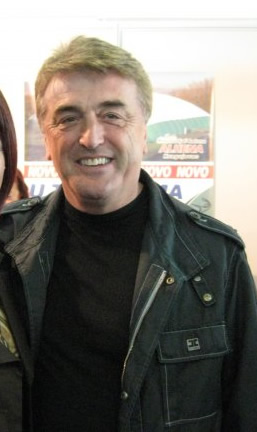
Radomir Antić managed both clubs.

Only two coaches have been at the helm of both clubs:

- (Uruguay) Enrique Fernández
  - Barcelona: 1947–1950
  - Real Madrid: 1953–1954
- (Serbia) Radomir Antić
  - Real Madrid: 1991–1992
  - Barcelona: 2003

== See also ==
- Derbi Barceloní – Football rivalry in Barcelona, Spain
- El Clásico (basketball) – Matches between Real Madrid and FC Barcelona
- List of sports rivalries
- Madrid derby – Club football rivalry in Madrid, Spain
- Major football rivalries
- Nationalism and sport
- Women's Clásico – Name for FC Barcelona Femení and Real Madrid CF Femenino rivalry
