= Juan José Mieza =

Spanish footballer

Personal information
- Full name: Juan José Mieza Goiri
- Date of birth: 10 February 1915
- Place of birth: Barakaldo, Spain
- Date of death: 12 December 1999 (aged 84)
- Place of death: Castro Urdiales, Spain
- Position: Defender

Senior career*
Years	Team	Apps	(Gls)
1934	Club Zaballa		
1934–1935	Unión de San Vicente		
1935	Irrintzi FC		
1935–1936	Athletic Club		
1939–1940	Barakaldo		
1940–1946	Athletic Bilbao		
1946–1949	Real Murcia		

International career
1941	Spain	2	(0)
- * Club domestic league appearances and goals

Juan José Mieza Goiri (10 February 1915 – 12 December 1999) was a Spanish footballer who played as a defender for Athletic Bilbao, Barakaldo, and Real Murcia in the 1930s and 1940s. He also played two international matches for Spain in 1941.

== Playing career ==
=== Club career ===
Born in the Biscayan town of Barakaldo on 10 February 1915, Mieza began his career as an amateur in Club Zaballa in 1934, before having brief stints at Unión de San Vicente and Irrintzi, until finally becoming a professional at Athletic Bilbao. He made his senior debut for Bilbao on 11 March 1935, in a Biscay Championship match against Osasuna, which ended in a 1–5 loss. Mieza made his La Liga on 15 March 1936, which ended in a 1–1 draw with Valencia. He went on to play three league matches as Bilbao won the 1935–36 La Liga title, which was the last before the outbreak of the Spanish Civil War.

After the War, Mieza was loaned for a year to Barakaldo CF before returning to Athletic for the 1940–41 season. Together with Raimundo Lezama, Agustín Gaínza, and Telmo Zarra, he was a member of the Bilbao team of Juan Urquizu that won the 1942–43 La Liga, along with two Copa del Rey titles in 1943 and 1945. Mieza helped his side to keep a clean-sheet in the 1943 final as Bilbao defeated Real Madrid by the score of 1–0 after extra-time, and then started in the 1945 final as his side achieved a 3–2 win over Valencia. He stayed with the club for six years, until 1947, playing a total of 110 official matches, but failing to score a single goal.

Mieza then played his last seasons of football at Real Murcia, where he retired in 1949, at the age of 34. In total, he played 98 matches in the Spanish first division.

=== International career ===
Mieza earned both of his international caps for Spain in 1941, in friendly matches against Portugal, the first in Lisbon, which ended in a 2–2 draw, and then in Bilbao, helping his side to a 5–1 win.

== Death ==
Mieza died in Castro Urdiales on 12 December 1999, at the age of 84.

== Honours ==
Athletic Bilbao

- La Liga:
  - Champions (2): 1935–36 and 1942–43
- Copa del Rey:
  - Champions (2): 1943 and 1945
