= Gonzalo Marzá =

Spanish footballer (1916–1996)

Personal information
- Full name: Gonzalo Marzá Trilles
- Date of birth: 10 April 1916
- Place of birth: Castellón de la Plana, Spain
- Date of death: 6 September 1996 (aged 80)
- Position: Goalkeeper

Gonzalo Marzá Trilles (10 April 1916 – 6 September 1996) was a Spanish footballer who played as a goalkeeper for Real Madrid.
