= 2002 Ballon d'Or =

Annual association football award event in France

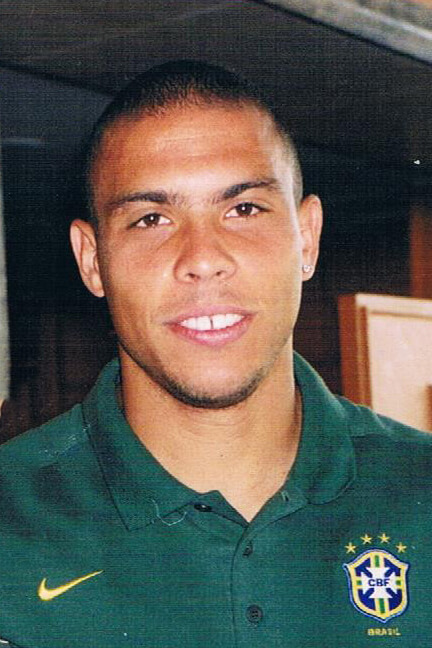
- 2002 Ballon d'Or winner, Ronaldo
- Date: 12 December 2002
- Presented by: France Football

Highlights
- Won by: (Brazil) Ronaldo (2nd award)
- Website: ballondor.com

The 2002 Ballon d'Or (lit. '2002 Golden Ball'), given to the best football player in Europe as judged by a panel of sports journalists from UEFA member countries, was awarded to Ronaldo on 12 December 2002. This was Ronaldo's second Ballon d'Or, his first award was in 1997.

Ronaldo was the first Brazilian national to win the award, when he won his first Ballon in 1997, since then Rivaldo had also won the award in 1999. He was also the fourth Real Madrid player to win the trophy after Alfredo Di Stéfano (1957, 1959), Raymond Kopa (1958), and Luís Figo (2000).

== Rankings ==
On 18 November 2002, the shortlist of 50 male players compiled by a group of experts from France Football was announced.

The voting results went as follows:

Rank	Player	Nationality	Club(s)	Points
1	Ronaldo (Note: France Football reports Ronaldo with 171 points. After reviewing each voter's vote, it seems that the vote from Scotland was counted backwards (1st choice was counted as 5th, 2nd as 4th, and so forth).)	Brazil	(Italy) Internazionale (Spain) Real Madrid	169
2	Roberto Carlos	Brazil	(Spain) Real Madrid	145
3	Oliver Kahn (Note: France Football reports Kahn with 114 points. After reviewing each voter's vote, it seems that the vote from Scotland was counted backwards (1st choice was counted as 5th, 2nd as 4th, and so forth).)	Germany	(Germany) Bayern Munich	110
4	Zinedine Zidane	France	(Spain) Real Madrid	78
5	Michael Ballack (Note: France Football reports Ballack with 67 points. After reviewing each voter's vote, it seems that the vote from Scotland was counted backwards (1st choice was counted as 5th, 2nd as 4th, and so forth).)	Germany	(Germany) Bayer Leverkusen (Germany) Bayern Munich	71
6	Thierry Henry	France	(England) Arsenal	54
7	Raúl	Spain	(Spain) Real Madrid	38
8	Rivaldo (Note: France Football reports Rivaldo with 29 points. After reviewing each voter's vote, it seems that the vote from Scotland was counted backwards (1st choice was counted as 5th, 2nd as 4th, and so forth).)	Brazil	(Spain) Barcelona (Italy) Milan	31
9	Yıldıray Baştürk	Turkey	(Germany) Bayer Leverkusen	13
10	Alessandro Del Piero	Italy	(Italy) Juventus	12
11	Hasan Şaş	Turkey	(Turkey) Galatasaray	10
12	Ronaldinho	Brazil	(France) Paris Saint-Germain	8
13	Michael Owen	England	(England) Liverpool	5
13	Ruud van Nistelrooy	Netherlands	(England) Manchester United	5
15	Bernd Schneider	Germany	(Germany) Bayer Leverkusen	4
15	Juan Carlos Valerón	Spain	(Spain) Deportivo La Coruña	4
15	Cafu	Brazil	(Italy) Roma	4
15	Patrick Vieira	France	(England) Arsenal	4
19	Lúcio	Brazil	(Germany) Bayer Leverkusen	3
19	Luís Figo	Portugal	(Spain) Real Madrid	3
21	Papa Bouba Diop	Senegal	(France) Lens	2
21	El Hadji Diouf	Senegal	(France) Lens (England) Liverpool	2
21	Rio Ferdinand	England	(England) Leeds United (England) Manchester United	2
24	Rubén Baraja	Spain	(Spain) Valencia	1
24	Filippo Inzaghi	Italy	(Italy) Milan	1
24	Roy Makaay	Netherlands	(Spain) Deportivo La Coruña	1

Additionally, 24 players were nominated but received no votes: Pablo Aimar (Valencia), Sonny Anderson (Lyon), David Beckham (Manchester United), Iker Casillas (Real Madrid), Djibril Cissé (Auxerre), Edmílson (Lyon), Ryan Giggs (Manchester United), Junichi Inamoto (Arsenal, Fulham), Miroslav Klose (1. FC Kaiserslautern), Patrick Kluivert (Barcelona), Luis Enrique (Barcelona), Claude Makélélé (Real Madrid), Paolo Maldini (Milan), Pauleta (Bordeaux), Tomáš Rosický (Borussia Dortmund), Javier Saviola (Barcelona), Seol Ki-hyeon (Anderlecht), Jon Dahl Tomasson (Feyenoord, Milan), Francesco Totti (Roma), David Trezeguet (Juventus), Pierre van Hooijdonk (Feyenoord), Christian Vieri (Internazionale), Marc Wilmots (Bordeaux) and Sylvain Wiltord (Arsenal).
