= Francisco Calvet =

Spanish footballer (1921–2001)

Personal information
- Full name: Francisco Calvet i Puig
- Date of birth: 29 September 1921
- Place of birth: Sant Joan Despí, Spain
- Date of death: 30 November 2001 (aged 80)
- Place of death: L'Hospitalet de Llobregat, Spain
- Position: Defender

Senior career*
Years	Team	Apps	(Gls)
1939–1952	Barcelona	151	(7)
1952–1954	Oviedo	21	(0)

International career
1950	Catalonia	3	(0)
1951	Spain	2	(0)
- * Club domestic league appearances and goals

Francisco Calvet i Puig (29 September 1921 – 30 November 2001) was a Spanish footballer who played for Barcelona between 1939 and 1952. He also played for Real Oviedo between 1952 and 1954.

== Career ==
Calvet was born in 1921 and came from peasant family that lived in Sant Joan Despí. In 1939, Calvet left his home to play football for Barcelona. He played there until 1952 and appeared in 238 games and scored a total of ten goals. In 1951-52, his last season at the club, he was part of the historic Barcelona team that won five trophies in one season. After his playing days in Barcelona were over, he continued his career in Oviedo, where he played between 1952 and 1954.

During his career, Calvet also won two caps for the Spain national football team. He played his two international games in span of a week. His first match came on June 10, 1951 against Belgium and the second one on June 17, 1951 against Sweden. He also appeared in three international games for Catalonia in 1950.

Calvet retired from football in 1954 at 33 years of age.

== Honours ==
- Spanish League: 1944-45, 1947–48, 1948–49, 1951–52
- Spanish Cup: 1942, 1951, 1952
- Latin Cup: 1949, 1952
- Copa Eva Duarte: 1945, 1948.
