= Luis Miró =

Spanish footballer and coach (1913–1991

Personal information
- Full name: Luis Miró Doñate
- Date of birth: 3 March 1913
- Place of birth: Barcelona, Spain
- Date of death: 15 September 1991 (aged 78)
- Place of death: Barcelona, Catalonia, Spain
- Position: Goalkeeper

Senior career*
Years	Team	Apps	(Gls)
1939–1943	Barcelona	50	(0)

Managerial career
- 1952–1953: Sabadell
- 1953–1956: Real Valladolid
- 1956–1958: Valencia CF
- 1959: Celta de Vigo
- 1959–1961: Sevilla FC
- 1961: Barcelona
- 1962–1963: Marseille
- 1964–1965: Roma
- 1965–1966: CD Málaga
- * Club domestic league appearances and goals

Luis Miró Doñate (3 March 1913 – 15 September 1991) was a Spanish football player and coach. As a player Miró played for FC Barcelona as a goalkeeper.

He then coached several teams in Spain, such as Sabadell, Valencia CF, Sevilla FC and former club FC Barcelona. He had then short spells abroad with Olympique de Marseille and A.S. Roma, before coming back in Spain with CD Málaga.
