= 1943 Copa del Generalísimo =

41st Copa del Rey
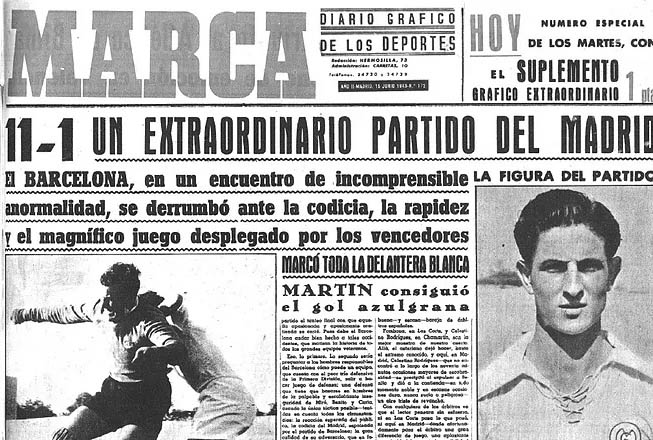
- Cover of Marca newspaper describing Real Madrid's 11–1 Victory over Barcelona as a "an extraordinary match"

Tournament details
- Country: Spain
- Teams: 32

Final positions
- Champions: Atlético Bilbao (14th title)
- Runners-up: Real Madrid

Tournament statistics
- Matches played: 64

The 1943 Copa del Generalísimo was the 41st staging of Copa del Rey. It was organized by the Royal Spanish Football Federation. There were a total of 32 teams participating. The competition began on 25 April 1943 and concluded on 20 June 1943 with the final, where Athletic Bilbao won their 14th title.

== First round ==
Team 1	Agg.	Team 2	1st leg	2nd leg
Ferrol	2–2	Deportivo Coruña	1–0	1–2
Real Valladolid	1–4	RC Celta	1–2	0–2
Real Gijón	4–6	Real Oviedo	1–2	3–4
Baracaldo	1–2	Atlético Bilbao	1-0	0-2
Real Sociedad	11–2	Arenas Guecho	8–0	3–2
CD Alavés	3–4	Real Zaragoza	2–3	1–1
Español	4–2	CA Osasuna	3–2	1–0
Constancia	3–3	Sabadell	2–1	1–2
UD Levante	3–11	Barcelona	2–3	1–8
Hércules CF	3–10	CD Castellón	0–2	3–8
Alcoyano	2–3	Valencia CF	2-1	0–2
Real Madrid CF	6–1	UD Salamanca	5–1	1–0
CD Málaga	3–8	Club Atlético de Aviación	0–0	3–8
Real Betis Balompié	4–3	Atlético Tetuán	1–3	3–0
Xerez CF	7–4	Sevilla CF	6–2	1–2
SD Ceuta	5–3	Granada CF	5–0	0–3

- Tiebreaker

Team 1	Score	Team 2
Ferrol	0–1	Deportivo Coruña
CD Constancia	1–0	CD Sabadell

== Round of 16 ==
Team 1	Agg.	Team 2	1st leg	2nd leg
Club Atlético de Aviación	4–2	Real Sociedad	4–2	0–0
Real Betis Balompié	1–5	SD Ceuta	1–1	0–4
Español	4–4	Real Madrid	1–1	3–3
RC Celta de Vigo	2–9	Barcelona	1–5	1–4
Club Atlético de Bilbao	8–2	CD Castellón	7–0	1–2
Zaragoza FC	3–4	Valencia CF	2–4	1–0
Real Oviedo CF	2–3	Deportivo Coruña	1–2	1–1
CD Constancia	3–5	Xerez CF	2–1	1–4

- Tiebreaker

Team 1	Score	Team 2
Real Madrid CF	2–0	Español

== Quarter-finals ==
Team 1	Agg.	Team 2	1st leg	2nd leg
Club Atlético de Aviación	2–7	Atlético de Bilbao	1–3	1–4
Barcelona	9–4	SD Ceuta	5–2	4–2
Xerez CF	4–6	Real Madrid	1–1	3–5
Valencia CF	5–2	Deportivo Coruña	2–2	3–0

== Semi-finals ==
Team 1	Agg.	Team 2	1st leg	2nd leg
CF Barcelona	4–11	Real Madrid	3–0	1–11
Atlético de Bilbao	3–2	Valencia CF	1–0	2–2

Barcelona faced Real Madrid in the semi-finals of the 1943 Copa del Generalísimo. The first leg match, played at Barcelona's Les Corts stadium in Catalonia, ended with Barcelona winning 3–0. On 13 June 1943, Real Madrid beat Barcelona 11–1 in the second leg, advancing to the final 11–4 on aggregate.

== Final ==
Team 1	Score	Team 2
Atlético de Bilbao	1–0 (a.e.t.)	Real Madrid

Copa del Generalísimo
winners
Atlético de Bilbao
14th title
