= 1939–40 Atlético Aviación season =

Season of Atlético Madrid

Athletic-Aviation Club/Atlético Madrid
1939–40 season
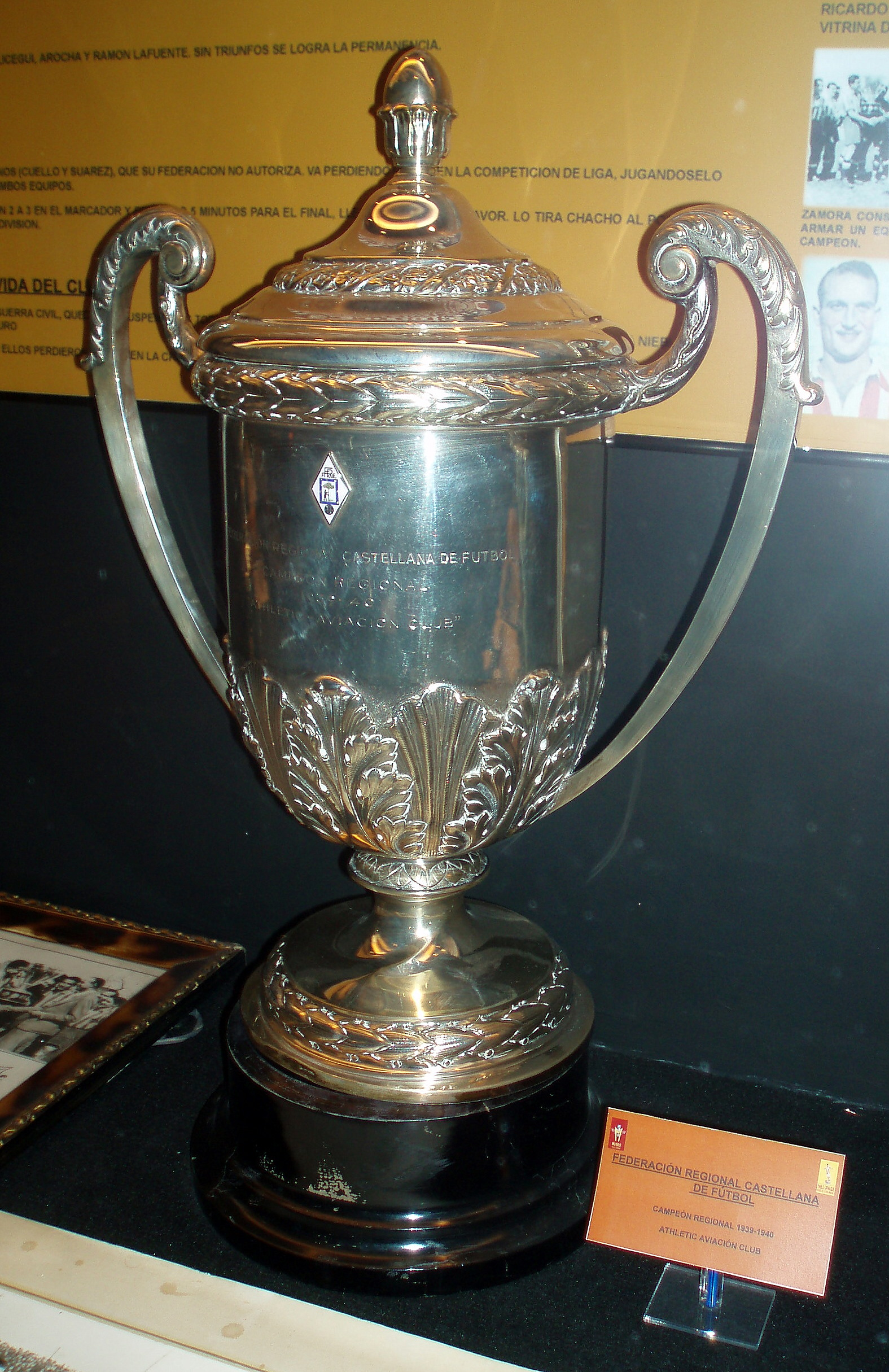
- Cup for the winner of the regional championship
- President: Luis Navarro
- Manager: Ricardo Zamora
- Stadium: Hippodrome of Lamiako
- 1939–40 La Liga: Champions
- Campeonato Mancomunado Centro: Champions
- Top goalscorer: League: Enrique (11); All: Julio Elícegui (24)
- Biggest win: Athletic Club 8–1 New Foot-Ball Club
- Biggest defeat: Athletic Club 2–3 Athletic Bilbao
Home colours

The 1939–40 Athletic-Aviation Club season was one of the most successful seasons in the history of Atlético Madrid. Atlético, who merged with Club Aviación Nacional at the start of the season, on 4 October 1939, won three titles within the next 12 months, the 1939 Campeonato Mancomunado Centro in November, the 1939–40 La Liga in April, and the 1940 Spanish Super Cup in September, although the latter was won in the following season.

== Summary ==
- 1 April: By the end of the Spanish Civil War, Atlético Madrid found itself in a difficult situation because they were lacking a suitable playing field since the Metropolitano had been completely destroyed by the war, lacking players because its squad had been decimated (including the club's star, Monchín Triana, who was shot down), and it accumulated an economic deficit that envisaged a dark future in its sporting and financial horizon. However, the club managed to save itself from an almost certain disappearance by merging with Club Aviación Nacional, a club that had been founded by three aviation officers.
- 4 October: After reaching a pre-agreement in September 1939, the representatives of both sides signed the absorption agreements on 4 October, and appointed the first Board of Directors with Commander Francisco Vives as president of the now Athletic-Aviation Club. Ricardo Zamora was appointed coach of Athletic Aviación, later to become Atlético Aviación.
- 5 October: Atlético Aviación played its very first match, the opening fixture of the 1939 Campeonato Mancomunado Centro, which ended in a 1–2 loss to AD Ferroviaria; Julio Elícegui was the author of the team's first goal. Atlético only won one of its first four matches, beating Real Valladolid, but drawing with Imperio CF and losing to Real Madrid CF.
- 19 November: Despite this rocky start, however, the team soon found its rhythm and style under the leadership of Zamora, and went on to win each of the remaining six Mancomunado matches, scoring a total of 24 goals for an average of four goals per game while only conceding three, keeping a clean-sheet against both Ferroviaria and Madrid, beating the later on the last matchday on 19 November as they finished level on points, but hedge out Madrid on goal difference, thus winning their first-ever title.
- 26 November: At that time, Real Oviedo also had its field destroyed by the war, so it was decided to give up its place to another team, and that final spot was contested by Atlético and CA Osasuna, in a match held in Valencia on 26 November, which Atlético Aviación won with a score of 3–1, with two goals from Enrique and one from Juan Vázquez, thus achieving promotion to La Liga.
- 3 December: Atlético Aviación defeated Athletic Bilbao 3–1 in their opening fixture of the 1939–40 La Liga, courtesy of a hat-trick from Enrique, which marked their first-ever win over the Basques in eleven meetings.
- Mid-December: After just over two months as the president of the club, Francisco Vives was replaced by Lieutenant Colonel Luis Navarro Garnica; José Maria Fernández as vice president, Cesáreo Galíndez as secretary, Paco Campos as technical secretary, José Bosmediano Toril as treasurer, and Juan Touzón as an accountant.
- 31 March 1940: The club then reached new heights, surprising everyone by winning their first La Liga title in 1940, just one point ahead of the second-placed Sevilla FC. The league's deciding match was, therefore, the return fixture between these two sides on 31 March, in which Atlético Aviación, who had lost in Seville 1–4, achieved their revenge with a 4–2 victory, courtesy of Paco Campos, Enrique, and Ramón Gabilondo (2).
- 28 April: The club officially confirmed the 1940 La Liga title with a 2–0 victory over Valencia CF, with goals from Campos and Elícegui.
- 28 May: In the 1940 Copa del Generalísimo, Atlético Aviación received a bye to the round of 16 in which they were set to face Real Zaragoza. As both legs ended in a draw, a tiebreaker was played on 28 May at a neutral ground, the Camp de Les Corts in Barcelona, which ended in a 2–4 loss.

== Squad ==
Note: Flags indicate national team as defined under FIFA eligibility rules; some limited exceptions apply. Players may hold more than one non-FIFA nationality.

No.	Pos.	Nation	Player
—	GK	ESP	Fernando Tabales (First club)
—	GK	ESP	Guillermo
—	DF	ESP	Alfonso Aparicio
—	DF	ESP	José Mesa
—	DF	ESP	Celso Pedro Blanco
—	DF	ESP	Juan Escudero
—	DF	ESP	José Cobo
—	DF	ESP	Alejandro Díaz García
—	MF	ESP	Francisco Arencibia
—	MF	ESP	Francisco Machín
—	MF	ESP	Santiago Buiría

No.	Pos.	Nation	Player
—	MF	ESP	Germán Gómez
—	MF	ESP	Ramón Gabilondo
—	MF	ESP	Luis Urquiri
—	MF	ESP	Cesáreo Bachiller
—	MF	ESP	Enrique
—	FW	ESP	Juan Vázquez
—	FW	ESP	Paco Campos
—	FW	ESP	Julio Elícegui
—	FW	ESP	Adolfo Bracero
—	FW	ESP	José Rubio

== Results ==
Atlético Aviación

=== Campeonato Mancomunado Centro ===
5 October 1939	Atlético Aviación	1 – 2	AD Ferroviaria	Madrid
	Elícegui 35'	Report1	García de la Puerta 38'; Trompi 61'

12 October 1939	Real Valladolid	0 – 3	Atlético Aviación	Valladolid
		Report1	Buiría 3'; Elícegui 10'; Escudero 77'

15 October 1939	Atlético Aviación	1 – 1	Imperio CF	Madrid
	Elícegui 78'	Report1	Bescos 30'

22 October 1939	Real Madrid	2 – 1	Atlético Aviación	Madrid
	Lecue 15'; Villanueva 88'	Report1	Campos 30'	Stadium: Estadio Chamartín

25 October 1939	AD Salamanca	0 – 3	Atlético Aviación	Salamanca
		Report1	Elícegui 47', 87'; Campos 77'

28 October 1939	AD Ferroviaria	0 – 4	Atlético Aviación	Madrid
	Escudero 15'; Elícegui 35', 67'; Enrique 87'	Report1

1 November 1939	Atlético Aviación	3 – 1	AD Salamanca	Madrid
	Campos 41', 56'; Elícegui 69'	Report1	Cano II 86'

5 November 1939	Atlético Aviación	8 – 0	Real Valladolid	Madrid
	Enrique 10', 60', 75'; Elícegui 50', 70', 86'; Campos 53', 72'	Report1

11 November 1939	Imperio CF	2 – 3	Atlético Aviación	Madrid
	Pepote 15'; Alday 65'	Report1	Elícegui 55'; Campos 68'; Arencibia 88'

19 November 1939	Atlético Aviación	3 – 0	Real Madrid	Madrid
	Campos 14', 26'; Vázquez 54'	Report1

=== Promotion playoff ===
26 November 1939	Atlético Aviación	3 – 1	CA Osasuna	Valencia
	Enrique 35', 74'; Vázquez 54'	Report1; Report2	Vergara 20'	Stadium: Mestalla Stadium; Referee: (Catalonia) Arribas Seijas

=== La Liga ===
3 December 1939 1st matchday	Athletic Bilbao	1 – 3	Atlético Aviación	Bilbao, Basque Country
	Garate 22'	Report1	Enrique 49', 52', 55'	Stadium: San Mamés; Referee: (Basque Country (autonomous community)) Crespo Orradre

10 December 1939 2nd matchday	Atlético Aviación	0 – 0	Real Betis	Madrid
		Report1		Stadium: Estadio Chamartín; Referee: (Catalonia) Tamarit Falaguera

17 December 1939 3rd matchday	Real Zaragoza	4 – 3	Atlético Aviación	Zaragoza
	Enrique 28'; Elícegui 50', 77'	Report1	Antón 55', 88'; Primo 58', 80'	Stadium: Estadio Torrero; Referee: (Catalonia) Arribas Seijas

24 December 1939 4th matchday	Atlético Aviación	3 – 0	FC Barcelona	Madrid
	Enrique 3', 54' (pen.); Arencibia 73'	Report1		Stadium: Estadio Chamartín; Referee: (Cantabria) Rodríguez Mato

31 December 1939 5th matchday	Hércules CF	4 – 1	Atlético Aviación	Alicante
	Aparício 22'; Tormo 56'; Vilanova 71', 85'	Report1	Arencibia 7'	Stadium: Bardín; Referee: (Catalonia) Tamarit Falaguera

7 January 1940 6th matchday	Atlético Aviación	2 – 1	Real Madrid	Madrid
	Enrique 25'; Arencibia 82'	Report1	Lecue 44'	Stadium: Estadio Chamartín; Referee: (Basque Country (autonomous community)) González Díaz

14 January 1940 7th matchday	Sevilla FC	4 – 1	Atlético Aviación	Seville
	Campanal I Raimundo 42', 55'; Pepillo 85'	Report1	Enrique 10' (pen.)	Stadium: Estadio de Nervión; Referee: (Catalonia) Sanchis Orduña

24 January 1940 8th matchday	Atlético Aviación	2 – 1	Racing de Santander	Madrid
	Vázquez 75'; Elícegui 79'	Report1	Chas 30'	Stadium: Estadio Chamartín; Referee: (Basque Country (autonomous community)) Gojenuri Eguiluz

28 January 1940 9th matchday	RCD Espanyol	2 – 0	Atlético Aviación	Barcelona, Catalonia
	Mas 7'; Quique 23'	Report1		Stadium: Sarrià Stadium; Referee: (Catalonia) Vilalta Bars

4 February 1940 10th matchday	Atlético Aviación	4 – 1	RC Celta de Vigo	Madrid
	Campos 23', 62'; Enrique 66'; Gabilondo 82'	Report1	Toro 70'	Stadium: Estadio Chamartín; Referee: (Catalonia) Ferrer Rodriguez

11 February 1940 11th matchday	Valencia CF	1 – 0	Atlético Aviación	Valencia
	Poli 10'	Report1		Stadium: Mestalla Stadium; Referee: (Catalonia) Espelta Mussons

18 February 1940 12th matchday	Atlético Aviación	3 – 1	Athletic Bilbao	Madrid
	Vázquez 42'; Elícegui 65', 89'	Report1	Unamuno 16'	Stadium: Estadio Chamartín; Referee: (Community of Madrid) Escartín Morán

25 February 1940 13th matchday	Real Betis	1 – 2	Atlético Aviación	Seville
	Cobo 37' (o.g.)	Report1	Gabilondo 20'; Vázquez 45'	Stadium: Estadio Benito Villamarín; Referee: (Catalonia) Agustín Cruella

3 March 1940 14th matchday	Atlético Aviación	5 – 1	Real Zaragoza	Madrid
	Campos 25', 53', 87'; Gabilondo 42'; Elícegui 77'	Report1	Antón 67' (pen.)	Stadium: Estadio Chamartín; Referee: (Andalusia) Ocaña Nieto

10 March 1940 15th matchday	FC Barcelona	1 – 2	Atlético Aviación	Barcelona
	Arencibia 73'	Report1	Elícegui 7'; Gabilondo 75'	Stadium: Camp de Les Corts; Referee: (Basque Country (autonomous community)) Jáuregui Ansó

17 March 1940 16th matchday	Atlético Aviación	2 – 1	Hércules CF	Madrid
	Enrique 15'; Elícegui 56'	Report1	Tatono 48'	Stadium: Estadio Chamartín; Referee: (Basque Country (autonomous community)) Jáuregui Ansó

24 March 1940 17th matchday	Real Madrid	2 – 0	Atlético Aviación	Madrid
	Alday 2'; Lecue 59'	Report1		Stadium: Estadio Chamartín; Referee: (Community of Madrid) Ramón Melcón

31 March 1940 18th matchday	Atlético Aviación	4 – 2	Sevilla FC	Madrid
	Campos 5'; Enrique 38'; Gabilondo 60', 89'	Report1	Pepillo 61'; Campanal I 77' (pen.)	Stadium: Estadio Chamartín; Referee: (Basque Country (autonomous community)) Crespo Orradre

7 April 1940 19th matchday	Racing de Santander	0 – 2	Atlético Aviación	Santander
		Report1	Vázquez 70'; Elícegui 76'	Stadium: El Sardinero; Referee: (Basque Country (autonomous community)) Gojenuri Eguiluz

14 April 1940 20th matchday	Atlético Aviación	2 – 0	RCD Espanyol	Madrid
	Campos 39'; Gabilondo 57'	Report1		Stadium: Estadio Chamartín; Referee: (Community of Madrid) Escartín Morán

21 April 1940 21st matchday	RC Celta de Vigo	1 – 0	Atlético Aviación	Vigo
	Agustín 18'	Report1		Stadium: Balaídos; Referee: (Basque Country (autonomous community)) Gojenuri Eguiluz

28 April 1940 22nd matchday	Atlético Aviación	2 – 0	Valencia CF	Madrid
	Campos 7'; Elícegui 75'	Report1		Stadium: Estadio Chamartín; Referee: (Catalonia) Arribas Seijas

=== Copa del Generalísimo ===
23 May 1940 First leg	Atlético Aviación	0 – 0	Real Zaragoza	Vallecas
		Report1		Referee: (Basque Country (autonomous community)) Gojenuri Eguiluz

26 May 1940 Second leg	Real Zaragoza	2 – 2	Atlético Aviación	Zaragoza
	Bilbao 40'; Antón 30'	Report1	Elícegui 20'; Arencibia 60'	Stadium: Estadio Torrero; Referee: (Catalonia) Agustín Cruella

28 May 1940 Replay	Real Zaragoza	4 – 2	Atlético Aviación	Barcelona
	Ruiz 11'; Olivares 33', 42'; Primo 57'	Report1	Elícegui 65'; Campos 87'	Stadium: Camp de Les Corts; Referee: (Catalonia) Vilalta Bars

== Statistics ==
Competition	Points	Total						GD
Competition	Points	G	V	N	P	Gf	Gs	GD
La Liga	29	22	14	1	7	43	29	+14
Copa del Generalísimo	-	3	0	2	1	4	6	-2
Campeonato Mancomunado Centro	15	10	7	1	2	30	8	+22
Total	44	35	21	4	10	77	43	+34

== Aftermath ==
In the following season, in 1940–41, Atlético Aviación won two more titles, the 1940 Spanish Super Cup in September, in which they beat RCD Espanyol 10–4 on aggregate, and the Copa Presidente Federación Castellana, in which they beat Real Madrid 3–1 on aggregate.
