= Celso Pedro Blanco =

Spanish footballer (1914–?)

Personal information
- Full name: Celso Pedro Blanco Álvarez
- Date of birth: 7 July 1914
- Place of birth: Santander, Spain
- Date of death: Unknown
- Place of death: Madrid, Spain
- Position: Defender

Senior career*
Years	Team	Apps	(Gls)
1935–1936	Celta de Vigo	22	(0)
1939–1943	Atlético Madrid	18	(0)
1943–1944	Imperio		

International career
1936	Spain	0	(0)
- * Club domestic league appearances and goals

Celso Pedro Blanco Álvarez (7 July 1914 – Unknown) was a Spanish footballer who played as a defender for Celta de Vigo and Atlético Madrid.

== Career ==
=== Celta de Vigo ===
Born in Vigo on 7 July 1914, Blanco was characterized by his physical strength, corpulence, and power in the air, which allowed him to excel on defense. In 1935, the 19-year-old Blanco was signed by Celta de Vigo, along with two other defenders (Varela and Ignacio), with the aim of helping Celta achieve its long-awaited promotion to the Spanish top flight, which they accomplished on 19 April 1936, following a 5–0 win over Xerez FC at the Balaídos.

With the confidence of the team's coach, Ricardo Comesaña, he played in 22 of Calta's 24 games that season, and the club's success convinced the national coach Amadeo García to call up two players from the team, Blanco and José Vega, to play in two friendlies against Czechoslovakia and Switzerland in April and May 1936, both away from home. However, while Vega made his debut against Switzerland in Bern, Blanco did not have the opportunity to do so as the coach preferred the Athletic Bilbao's Ángel Zubieta in his place.

=== Atlético Madrid ===
Blanco never got to make his top-flight debut with Celta because of the outbreak of the Spanish Civil War, being transferred to Zaragoza, where he met Ensign Francisco Salamanca, who recruited him as part of his project of forming a football team for the soldiers to entertain themselves on their days off: the Club Aviación Nacional. Once the conflict was over, Atlético Madrid avoided disappearance by merging with Club Aviación, where Blanco had been playing since its formation in 1937, just like Alfonso Aparicio and Juan Vázquez.

Blanco was a member of Athletic's historic 1939–40 season, in which the club, under manager Ricardo Zamora, won the 1939 Campeonato Mancomunado Centro in November, then the promotion playoff against CA Osasuna on 26 November, in which he started, followed by the 1939–40 La Liga in April, and the 1940 Spanish Super Cup in September, playing a total of 13 league matches during that season. However, a serious injury in 1940 greatly reduced his appearances, featuring only twice as Atlético won the league again the following season, and playing his last league game in the first division on 14 March 1943. Despite this, Blanco was still able to participate in Athletic's triumphant campaign at the 1941–47 FEF President Cup, the longest tournament in the history of Spanish football, playing in two of Athletic's five matches in April and May 1941; the club secured the title after winning the postponed match against Valencia CF six years later, in 1947.

In total, Blanco played 18 La Liga matches for Atlético, but failed to score a single goal.

=== Later career ===
Blanco played his last season of football in 1943–44 with the then subsidiary of Atlético Madrid Imperio CF, then coached by Luis Urquiri, featuring alongside Julián Cuenca, who went on to join Atlético Madrid, and playing one cup match.

== Honours ==
Celta Vigo

- Segunda División: 1935–36

Club Aviación Nacional

- La Liga: 1939–40, 1940–41
- Copa de los Campeones de España: 1940
