= Enrique Rubio (footballer) =

Spanish footballer

Personal information
- Full name: Enrique Rubio Alcázar
- Date of birth: 19 July 1915
- Place of birth: Ferrol, A Coruña, Spain
- Date of death: 1991 (aged 75-76)
- Place of death: Spain
- Position: Midfielder

Senior career*
Years	Team	Apps	(Gls)
1935–1936	Atlético Madrid		
1939–1941	Atlético Aviación	31	(12)
1941–1942	Alicante	12	(1)
1942–1943	Real Betis		
1943–1950	Lucense		
- * Club domestic league appearances and goals

Enrique Rubio Alcázar, better known as Enrique (19 July 1915 – 1991), was a Spanish footballer who played as a midfielder for Atlético Madrid and Real Betis in the early 1940s.

== Playing career ==
=== Atlético Madrid ===
Born in Ferrol on 19 July 1915, Enrique was playing at Atlético Madrid when his career was halted by the outbreak of the Spanish Civil War, and once the conflict was over, Atlético avoided disappearance by merging with Club Aviación Nacional, which had been founded by three aviation officers in 1937. On 26 November 1939, Atlético faced Osasuna in Valencia for the right to play in La Liga and thus replace Real Oviedo, whose field had been destroyed by the war; Enrique scored a brace to help his side to a 3–1 win.

Enrique played a crucial role in Athletic's historic 1939–40 season, in which the club, under the coach Ricardo Zamora, won the 1939 Campeonato Mancomunado Centro in November, the 1939–40 La Liga in April, and the 1940 Spanish Super Cup in September. During this season, he scored a total 17 goals in 33 official matches, including 4 goals in the Campeonato Mancomunado, a brace in the promotion playoff against CA Osasuna, and the remaining 11 goals in the league, thus finishing the season as the club's top scorer in the league. Notably, in the opening matchday on 3 December 1939, he netted a second-half hat-trick against Athletic Bilbao to help his side to a 3–1 comeback win, which marked their first-ever victory over the Basques in eleven meetings. The league's deciding match was the return fixture against Sevilla on 31 March, in which Enrique scored twice in a 4–2 victory.

Together with Alfonso Aparicio, Paco Campos, and Juan Vázquez, he played a crucial role in helping the club win the first two League titles in the Colchoneros history in 1939–40 and 1940–41. As the league winners, they contested the 1940 Spanish Super Cup against the Copa del Rey winners, RCD Espanyol, in a two-legged game in September, in which Enrique only played in the first leg, which ended in a 3–3 draw. In total, he scored 18 goals in 44 official matches for Atlético.

=== Later career ===
Enrique then played one season for the Segunda División side Alicante in 1941–42, at the end of which he joined Real Betis, then in the first division, where he also played for only one season. In total, he scored 13 goals in 43 La Liga matches.

Enrique spent the final years of his career at Lucense, where he played for seven years, from 1943 until 1950, when he retired at the age of 35.

== Death ==
Enrique died in 1991, at the age of either 75 or 76.

== Honours ==
Atlético Aviación

- Spanish Second Division
  - Champions (1): 1939 (Note: They defeated CA Osasuna, in a match for a spot in LA Liga held in Valencia on 26 November 1939, which Aviación won 3–1.)
- 1939 Mancomunado
  - Champions (1): 1939
- La Liga:
  - Champions (2):1939–40, and 1940–41.
- Spanish Super Cup
  - Champions (1): 1940.
