= Manuel Torres (footballer, born 1912) =

Spanish footballer and manager (1912–1990)

Personal information
- Full name: Manuel Torres Aragón
- Date of birth: 11 July 1912
- Place of birth: Cantillana, Spain
- Date of death: 2 April 1990 (aged 77)
- Place of death: Spain
- Position: Midfielder

Senior career*
Years	Team	Apps	(Gls)
1930–1933	Real Betis		
1933–1936	Nacional de Madrid		
1939–1940	Atlético Aviación	1	(0)
1940–1941	Cádiz		
1942–1943	Salamanca		
Total		1	(0)

Managerial career
- Calavera
- Real Betis (youth)
- * Club domestic league appearances and goals

Manuel Torres Aragón (11 July 1912 – 2 April 1990) was a Spanish footballer who played as a midfielder for Real Betis and Atlético Madrid in the 1930s.

== Playing career ==
Born on 11 July 1912 in the Andalusian town of Cantillana, Torres began his football career at Real Betis in 1930, aged 18, with whom he played for three seasons, until 1933. He mostly remained an unused substitute at Betis, playing only three official matches for the club between 1930 and 1932, two in the 1930–31 Segunda División and one in the Andalusian championship, thus failing to appear in Betis' triumphant campaign in the 1931–32 Segunda División, so he is not officially considered one of its winners. In the 1932–33 season, he was one of the first players of Betis' newly-formed amateur reserve team, then coached by Andrés Aranda, where he played alongside the likes of José Luis Espinosa and Paquirri. During that season, he only played one official match for the Betis first team, in which he scored an equaliser in an eventual 2–1 victory over his future club Nacional de Madrid.

Unsatisfied with his lack of playing time, Torres went to Nacional de Madrid in 1933, with whom he played for three years, until 1936, when the Spanish Civil War broke out. Once the conflict ended in 1939, Torres returned to the capital, this time joining Atlético Aviación (currently known as Atlético Madrid). He was a member of Atlético's historic 1939–40 season, in which the club, under the coach Ricardo Zamora, won the 1939 Campeonato Mancomunado Centro in November, the 1939–40 La Liga in April, and the 1940 Spanish Super Cup in September, to which he contributed with 7 out of 8 matches in the Mancomunado Championship, and one in the league. Coincidentally, his sole top-flight appearance came against his former club, Real Betis, helping his side to a 2–1 win at the Heliópolis.

Torres left Atlético at the end of the season to join Cádiz, then in the second division, making his official debut in a league fixture against Racing de Córdoba on 29 September 1940, and playing his last match for the club just three months later, on 1 December, in a league fixture against Jerez. He then played one last season of football with Salamanca (1942–43).

== Managerial career ==
Torres later coached Calavera and the Real Betis youth team.

== Death ==
Torres died on 2 April 1990, at the age of 77.

== Honours ==
Atlético Aviación

- Campeonato Regional Centro
  - Champions (1): 1939 Mancomunado
- La Liga:
  - Champions (1):1939–40
