= Francisco Salamanca =

Spanish military man, mechanic, and sportsperson

- Born: Francisco Gutiérrez de Salamanca y González-Longoria; Madrid, Spain
- Died: 1954; Madrid, Spain
- Citizenship: Spanish
- Occupations: Mechanic; Soldier; Sportsperson
- Known for: Founder of Club Aviación Nacional

Francisco Gutiérrez de Salamanca y González-Longoria was a Spanish soldier, mechanic, and sportsperson, who founded Club Aviación Nacional in 1937.

== Early life and education ==
Born in Madrid, Salamanca attended high school at the prestigious Colegio de Nuestra Señora del Pilar, graduating in 1924.

== Military career ==
Salamanca then moved to the United States, where he trained as a commercial and mechanical expert. In 1928, he was called up, but by the provisional regulations, which exempted him from military service for being a Spaniard residing in the American countries.

Having returned to Spain, Salamanca joined the national troops during the outbreak of the Spanish Civil War in 1936. As an expert in all types of engines who was also an extremely skilled handyman, his collaboration was sought by José Bosmediano, the quartermaster Captain of Kindelán's small general staff. Together with aeronautical engineer and Commander Francisco Vives, they went to Salamanca in 1937, when Francisco Franco set up his headquarters in Termes. A car mechanic, he was then mobilized to the Matacán Air Base on the National side, as a member of the 35th Aviation Automobile Unit.

== Sporting career ==
=== Club Aviación Nacional ===
In 1937, Salamanca, together with some other aviation officers from the Matacán Air Base, decided to create a football team called Club Aviación Nacional, not only to pass the time and to ease out the stress from the war, but also to stay in shape and raise funds for their cause through friendly matches. (Note: The team was founded by Lieutenants Salamanca and González Conlicosa, Captains José Bosmediano and Sergio Trujillo, Commander Francisco Vives, and Colonel Abella, but some sources state that Aviación Nacional was founded only by three aviation officers of the 35th Aviation Automobile Unit, Ensign Salamanca, Lieutenant González Conlicosa, and Captain Trujillo.) For this end, they began recruiting young football enthusiasts among volunteers who had completed their compulsory military service, together with professional players, especially from the Canary Islands, and when they finally managed to gather enough players to assemble two teams they started organizing football matches for patriotic and charitable purposes.

In the summer of 1938, the 35th Unit had to move to Zaragoza for the Battle of the Ebro, and whilst there, Salamanca recruited several future stars, such as Alfonso Aparicio, Guillermo, Juan Vázquez, and Celso Pedro Blanco. Despite not being a federated club, Aviación participated and won the 1938–39 Aragón Regional Championship, thus qualifying for the Copa del Generalísimo in 1939, where they were knocked out in the quarterfinals by Sevilla FC 3–4 on aggregate, after having won the first leg 2–0. This meant that Aviación had enough quality to face any national club, but they could not play in La Liga due to their military status, so Salamanca requested help from the Castilian Federation to find a club to merge with, such as Real Madrid or Atlético Madrid (then known as Athletic de Madrid), and indeed, when the war ended in 1939, the club moved to Madrid, playing their first match there on 2 May 1939 at the Vallecas Stadium against Deportivo Alavés. Additionally, after the war he was promoted to honorary lieutenant and changed rank to become a complement officer.

=== Athletic-Aviación ===
In late 1939, Atlético Madrid was experiencing the lowest moment of its history because the war had destroyed the Metropolitano stadium and decimated its squad, being also on the verge of bankruptcy, but they managed to find a lifeline in the form of Club Aviación Nacional. Together with Captain José Bosmediano, Salamanca was one of the two representatives of Aviación who negotiated its merger with Atlético Madrid, whose representatives, Juan Touzón and Cesáreo Galíndez, proposed a deal that could benefit everyone. Aviación required to impose its name, its shield, the colors of its uniform, and 50% of the directors and the president, and Atlético succumbed to these demands because they were both desperate and scared of CD Nacional de Madrid, which was also interested in merging with Aviación Nacional. Thus, on 4 October 1939, the representatives of both sides signed the agreements and appointed the first Board of Directors, in which Commander Francisco Vives was named president of the now Athletic-Aviación Club.

Salamanca was closely involved with Athletic's historic 1939–40 season, in which the club, under the coach Ricardo Zamora, won the 1939 Campeonato Mancomunado Centro in November, the 1939–40 La Liga in April, and the 1940 Spanish Super Cup in September. Throughout the season, Salamanca's main priority was to finish the works on the old Vallecas Stadium, where the club was able to play its last home league games, after having to use the Chamartín for large part of the season.

== Later life ==
Due to his American training as a commercial and mechanical expert, Salamanca was assigned to the General Directorate of Materials of the Ministry of the Air, but years later, he decided to change specialty, becoming part of military offices until he died in 1954.
