= Francisco Arencibia =

Spanish footballer and manager (1912–2004)

Personal information
- Full name: Francisco Martín Arencibia
- Date of birth: 28 December 1912
- Place of birth: Alquízar, Cuba
- Date of death: 28 February 2004 (aged 91)
- Place of death: Las Palmas de Gran Canaria, Spain
- Position: Midfielder

Youth career
- Tenerife

Senior career*
Years	Team	Apps	(Gls)
1930–1935	Tenerife		
1935–1936	Atlético Madrid	9	(5)
1939–1947	Atlético Aviación	104	(37)
1947–1949	Granada	81	(58)
1950–1951	Tenerife		

International career
1942	Spain	1	(0)

Managerial career
- 1949–1950: Las Palmas
- * Club domestic league appearances and goals

Francisco Martín Arencibia (28 December 1912 – 28 February 2004), also known as Pancho Arencibia, was a Cuban-Spanish footballer who played as a midfielder for Atlético Aviación, Granada, and the Spanish national team in the 1940s. As a player he was a member of what many consider to be the best Deportivo de Tenerife side in its history and then won two league titles for Atlético Aviación.

After he retired, he became the very first manager of UD Las Palmas in 1949.

== Early life ==
Pancho Arencibia was born in 1911 in Alquízar on the Island of Cuba, as the son of a Canarian family who had emigrated to the Caribbean pearl. Shortly after he was born, his family returned to the Canary Islands, where Arencibia began playing football in Tenerife, more specifically in La Laguna, where he was a student.

== Playing career ==
=== Early career ===
At the age of 15, Arencibia was already playing for the historic Real Hespérides, where he stood out in the matches against their island rivals, such as Real Club Victoria and Club Deportivo de Tenerife. He was thus signed by the latter in 1930, becoming a part of one of the best sides in the club's history, which was champion of the Canary Islands in 1932, thus achieving qualification for the 1932 Spanish Cup.

In the following seasons, Arencibia led the blue and white team against several important teams, such as Español, Athletic Bilbao, the Austrian club FK Austria Wien, and the English team Everton. He also played matches in Las Palmas against Liverpool, in Madrid against Atlético, in Las Corts against FC Barcelona, and in the Santa Cruz de Tenerife Stadium against Real Madrid and Donosti in 1932, beating the latter two comfortably. Therefore, several players from this Tenerife team went on to sign for top-flight teams, including Arencibia, who was signed by Atlético Madrid in 1935 (then known as Athletic de Madrid) for 35,000 pesetas and a monthly salary of 1,500 pesetas.

=== Atlético Aviación ===
Arencibi made his debut with the Colchoneros in a La Liga fixture against Athletic Bilbao at the Vallecas, scoring a goal in an eventual 1–2 loss. He quickly established himself as a regular starter, scoring 5 goals in 9 matches that season, but his career was then interrupted by the outbreak of the Spanish Civil War in July 1936. Once the conflict ended in 1939, Arencibi returned to Atlético, now known as Atlético Aviación, where under coach Ricardo Zamora, and together with Pruden, Paco Campos, and Vázquez, he played a crucial role in helping the club win the first two League titles in the Colchoneros history in 1939–40 and 1940–41.

As the league winners, Atlético contested the 1940 Spanish Super Cup against the Copa del Rey winners, RCD Espanyol, in a two-legged clash in September, in which Arencibi scored once in the second leg to help Atlético Aviación to a 7–1 victory (10–4 on aggregate). He stayed loyal to the club until 1947, playing alongside other Tenerife players, such as Campos, Mesa, and Mundo. In total, he scored 56 goals for Atlético in the 138 League games, including 42 goals in 113 La Liga matches.

=== Later years ===
After leaving the capital, Arencibia played one season with Granada, then in the Segunda División, where he played for two seasons, until 1949, when he retired at the age of 37.

== International career ==
On 12 April 1942, the 29-year-old Arencibia earned his first (and only) international cap for Spanish national team, in a friendly match against Nazi Germany held in Berlin, which ended in a 1–1 draw. He was unable to earn any other cap for the national team because of the great competition that there was for the midfield position, where mainly Zarra blocked his way.

== Managerial career ==
After retiring as a player in 1949, Arencibia became the first coach of the newly created Unión Deportiva Las Palmas, directing the yellow team's very first training session on 16 September 1949 at the Las Palmas Stadium. Two months later, however, he resigned for work reasons.

== Death ==
He died on 28 February 2004, at the age of 91.

== Honours ==
Atlético Aviación

- La Liga:
  - Winners (1): 1940–41.
- Spanish Super Cup
  - Winners (1): 1940
- Copa Presidente Federación Castellana
  - Winners (1): 1940–41
