= Luis Urquiri =

Spanish footballer and manager (1906–1979)

Personal information
- Full name: Luis Urquiri Uraín
- Date of birth: 1 September 1906
- Place of birth: Deba, Gipuzkoa, Spain
- Date of death: 1 May 1979 (aged 72)
- Position: Midfielder

Senior career*
| Years | Team | Apps | (Gls) |
| 1923–1925 | Lagun Artea | | |
| 1925–1934 | Alavés | 50 | (0) |
| 1939–1940 | Atlético Aviación | 11 | (0) |
| 1940–1941 | Imperio | | |
| 1941–1942 | Alicante | | |
| 1942–1943 | Hércules | | |

Managerial career
- 1942–1943: Hércules
- 1943–1944: Imperio
- 1945–1947: Hércules
- 1947–1948: Deportivo La Coruña
- 1948–1949: Málaga
- 1950–1951: Zaragoza
- 1951–1953: Oviedo
- 1953: Celta
- 1953–1954: Oviedo
- 1954–1955: Racing Santander
- 1955–1956: Celta
- 1956–1958: Alavés
- * Club domestic league appearances and goals

Luis Urquiri Uraín (1 September 1906 – 1 May 1979) was a Spanish footballer who played as a midfielder for Deportivo Alavés and Atlético Madrid,

He later became a manager, achieving 4 promotions to the first division with four different clubs, Deportivo de La Coruña, CD Málaga, Real Zaragoza, and Real Oviedo, doing it so in just five years (1947–1952).

== Playing career ==
Luis Urquiri was born on 1 September 1906 in Deba, Gipuzkoa, and began his footballing career at CD Lagun Artea in 1923, at the age of 17, with whom he played for two years until 1925, when he was signed by Deportivo Alavés. He stayed loyal to the club for a decade, from 1925 to 1935, playing in the inaugural season of the Segunda División in 1929, and playing a pivotal role, together with the likes of Manuel Olivares, Andrés Calero, and Jacinto Quincoces under coach Francisco Baonza, in helping Alavés achieve promotion to La Liga in 1930. With Alavés, he played a total of 50 top division matches in three seasons between 1930 and 1933, the year in which the club got relegated back to the second division.

When the Spanish Civil War ended in 1939, Urquiri joined Atlético Aviación, the future Atlético Madrid, where he was a member of Athletic's historic 1939–40 season, in which the club won the 1939 Campeonato Mancomunado Centro in November, the 1939–40 La Liga in April, and the 1940 Spanish Super Cup in September, under coach Ricardo Zamora, playing seven league matches during that season, including in the decisive match against Valencia CF in the last day of the league on 28 April (2–0). In the Super Cup, he only played in the second leg, helping his side to a 7–1 win over RCD Espanyol to seal a 10–4 aggregate victory. In the following season, Atlético won league again, but this time Urquiri did not play a major role in this triumph as he only played four La Liga matches before being replaced by Manín of Racing de Santander. In total, Urquiri played 61 La Liga matches, 50 for Alavés and 11 for Atlético.

In 1940, Urquiri joined Imperio CF, which at the time served as a subsidiary of Atlético Aviación, and he then went on to play for both Alicante CF and Hércules CF before retiring in 1943, at the age of 37.

== Managerial career ==
=== Back-to-back promotions with Coruña and Málaga ===
After his career as a player ended, Urquiri remained linked to Hércules, now as a coach, which he oversaw in two stages, first in 1942–43 as a Player-coach, and then in 1945–47, being unable to avoid relegation to the second division in 1946. He also returned to Imperio of Tercera División for one season in 1943–44, in which the club participated in the Copa del Rey for the first time, beating CD Toledo (9–0), RSD Alcalá (1–2), and CD Acero in the previous qualifying rounds to be eliminated by Albacete Balompié in fifth round (1–4 on aggregate).

As a coach, Urquiri specialized himself in achieving promotions to the first division, doing so in back-to-back seasons with Deportivo de La Coruña (1947–48) and CD Málaga (1948–49). At the beginning of the 1948–49 season with Málaga, he hired Cesáreo López to play as goalkeeper, Manuel González as a defender, who went from the most insulted player in La Rosaleda Stadium, "González, the criminal defender of Granada", to become "the honorable Gonzalez"; and the third on the list of reinforcements for Urquiri was Castor Elzo, a veteran who had helped him in the promotion of Coruña. This Málaga side was the one that conceded the fewest goals and only lost six games on its way to promotion, which was achieved on the last matchday with a 5–1 away victory over Racing de Ferrol to finish level on points with both Real Sociedad and Granada, but ahead of the latter on head-to-head goal difference.

=== Real Zaragoza ===
Despite this encouraging first steps with Málaga, the club's president Manuel Navarro Nogueroles fired him with the false allegation of his financial demands, so he went to Zaragoza to achieve his third promotion in as many tries. Urquiri, who was warned that he had full powers to make the lineup, signed for Zaragoza on 21 June for 100,000 pesetas and a succulent promotion bonus, stating "I promise to work instead of talking. My motto is to work hard and speak only what is essential. The climb will be difficult". Once Urquiri was hired, Zaragoza immediately got to work configuring a squad for promotion, a squad that, for the first time in its history, was not going to have any Aragonese player due to the retirement of Víctor and the end of Malo and Montolio's contracts. He signed several players in June, such as the wingers Roig II and Paco Pitarch, the veteran midfielder Isidoro Urra, and the defender Calo, the brother of César. The best ones, however, came in the last week of August, when Zaragoza unexpectedly signed both Rosendo Hernández and Gonzalvo II, who were just coming off from the 1950 World Cup in Brazil; the former through a transfer of 600,000 pesetas, a fortune for the time, and the latter through a three-year contract and with a bonus of 200,000 pesetas for each season, becoming the first player with a car in the history of Zaragoza. This heave spending earned Zaragoza the nickname of 'millionaire' and the status of most favorite ascent; between transfers, bonuses, and monthly salaries, the cost of the 1950–51 squad exceeded four million pesetas, a great figure for a Second Division team.

Although Zaragoza never dropped below second place in the 1950–51 season, a scandalous defeat in Gijón hurt them greatly and coach Urquiri began to be seriously questioned. A defeat to the very modest Gimnástica de Tarragona ended up complicating things more because it served as a direct promotion to Gijón, so everyone became nervous due to the colossal economic effort made. A new defeat in Tarragona against the bottom team left Zaragoza already five points behind the leader Gijón and it put an end to the diminished credit of Urquiri, who was soft and excessively contemplative with the players, and always seemed overwhelmed by the theoretical favoritism from Zaragoza. He was dismissed the next day, on 2 April 1951, although the decision was disguised with the surprising euphemism that he was going to be absent from the city for a few days "for vacation", being replaced by Juanito Ruiz. Urquiri was silent for three weeks, but eventually stated that: "Between me and a board that cannot leave, I have chosen to sacrifice myself. I am happy to have left the team in second place in the standings, although the board has not forgiven me for Zaragoza not being first. The team has given the performance that I expected. No more no less". Zaragoza could not reach the direct promotion, but its second place allowed them to compete in the play-offs, which they won.

Urquiri remains the Zaragoza coach with the third-most weeks at the top, with five weeks in the 1950–51 Second division, one more than in the 1955–56 season with Mundo, which also ended in promotion; but behind Arsenio with seven (1977–78), and Paco Flores with eight (2002–03). In total, Urquiri coached 27 matches in Zaragoza, 16 wins, 5 draws, and 6 losses for an unbeaten ratio of 22.22%, which is the fourth best among Zaragoza coaches only behind Arsenio with 21.05% (1977–78), Rafael Iriondo with 18.75% (1971–72), and Marcelino García Toral with 16.67% (2008–09), all of which also went on to achieve promotion to the first division. The then Zaragoza goalkeeper Candi later described the coach Urquiri as a "serious, practical, he did not like nonsense. He worked hard to make such a different squad get along, something that is fundamental in football then and now".

=== Real Oviedo and Celta de Vigo ===
On 15 August 1951, Urquiri replaced De las Alas to take charge of Real Oviedo, which he guided to a streak of 563 minutes without conceding a single goal in the 1951–52 Segunda División, the club's second-best record only behind the 578-minutes in 1971–72 season. This streak proved to be crucial in leading his side to yet another promotion to the first division in 1952 (this time as champions), his fourth promotion in just five years, and this time he remained as coach to finally return to La Liga for the first time since his days at Hércules. On 2 November 1952, Urquiri led Oviedo to a 3–1 victory over Real Madrid that saw them in fifth position in the league table, shared with Valencia and just five points behind the leader, Espanyol. On 5 April 1953, Oviedo scored its 700th goals in La Liga in a 6–3 win over Real Valladolid.

In 1953, Urquiri took a break in his career with Oviedo to briefly coach Celta de Vigo, which was immersed in the relegation zone to the Second Division. He arrived in Vigo in May, replacing Armando Márquez, and made his debut with Celta against Atlético Tetuán on 31 May 1953, which ended in a 4–1 win. Urquiri managed to pull off the escape from relegation, but only thanks to the resignation of España Industrial, which recognized its affiliation to FC Barcelona. He then returned to Oviedo, which he coached until 1954, when he took charge of Racing de Santander for one season (1954–55).

For the 1955–56 season, Urquiri was once again hired by Celta after Antonio Barrios, who already had an agreement with Celta, left for Atlético Madrid. The coach kept Celta in the quiet zone in a good season in which the Vigo forward Mauro almost reached the Pichichi Trophy, falling just one goal short of Alfredo Di Stéfano. At the end of the season, Urquiri left the team, being replaced by Alejandro Scopelli.

=== Later career ===
Urquiri's last coaching job was at his former club Deportivo Alavés for two seasons between 1956 and 1958, and another one in 1965–66, at the age of 59. In total, he coached 105 La Liga games with a balance of 35 wins, 17 draws, and 53 losses, with his teams scoring 165 goals, but conceding 222.

== Outside of football ==
In October 1950, Urquiri appeared as a petitioner to the industry delegations of Alava in respect of setting up an industry of engine rectifications.

== Death ==
Urquiri died on 1 May 1979, at the age of 72.

== Honours ==
=== Player ===
Deportivo Alavés

- Segunda División: 1929–30

Atlético Aviación

- Campeonato Regional Centro: 1939
- La Liga: 1939–40, 1940–41
- Spanish Super Cup: 1940

=== Coach ===
Real Oviedo

- Segunda División: 1951–52
