= Alfonso Aparicio =

Spanish footballer and manager

Personal information
- Full name: Alfonso Aparicio Gutiérrez de la Fuente
- Date of birth: 14 August 1919
- Place of birth: Santander, Cantabria, Spain
- Date of death: 1 February 1999 (aged 79)
- Place of death: Madrid, Spain
- Position: Midfielder

Youth career
- Daring Club
- Magdalena
- 1935–1936: Unión Juventud de Santander

Senior career*
Years	Team	Apps	(Gls)
1938–1952	Atlético Madrid	213	(3)
1952–1953	Boavista		

International career
1945–1949	Spain	8	(0)

Managerial career
- 1959–1960: Levante UD
- 1960–1961: Rayo Vallecano
- 1961–1962: Atlético Baleares
- * Club domestic league appearances and goals

Alfonso Aparicio Gutiérrez de la Fuente (14 August 1919 – 1 February 1999) was a Spanish footballer who played as a midfielder for Atlético Madrid. With them, he won four La Liga titles in 1939–40, 1940–41, 1949–50, and 1950–51, thus being the player in the club's history who has won the most league titles. He was called up 8 times for Spain between 1945 and 1949.

After retiring, he became a manager and, for a long time, field delegate of Atlético Madrid.

== Early life ==
Aparicio was born in Santander, Cantabria, on 14 August 1919. At the age of eight he witnessed his first match, and since then he has not missed a single match played by Racing, the main team from his native Santander. At the Colegio de los Jesuitas in Orduña, he met and played with Lucio del Álamo, who would later come to play for Athletic Bilbao. Like so many other young people from Santander, he played football on the beach of Sardinero or under the discipline of very modest local societies, such as Daring Club, Magdalena, and Juventud Sport.

His passion for the sport was such that at Unión Juventud de Santander, he even paid to play, but his sint there was cut short by the outbreak of the Spanish Civil War in 1936, with the then 17-year-old Aparicio enlisting as a volunteer in Aviation Corps. He was enrolled as a replacement soldier in 1940 in the Automobile Regiment until 20 May 1942, when he was discharged.

== Club career ==
=== Club Aviación Nacional ===
Two years later, in the middle of the war, Aparicio was transferred to Zaragoza, where he met Ensign Francisco Salamanca, who was recruiting men for the project of forming a football team for the soldiers to entertain themselves on their days off: the Club Aviación Nacional. Once the conflict was over, Atlético Madrid avoided disappearance by merging with Club Aviación, where Aparicio had been playing since its formation in 1937. In this way he became a First Division footballer when the championships resumed.

Aparicio quickly established himself as an undisputed starter under coach Ricardo Zamora, who placed him as a central defender, making him the first football player in Spain to play in that specific position. He formed a great defensive partnership with José Mesa, one of the most solid in the club's history, which played a crucial role in Athletic's historic 1939–40 season, in which the club won the 1939 Campeonato Mancomunado Centro and the 1939–40 La Liga. He later formed a defensive trio with José Luis Riera and Alfonso Silva, which went down in history both at Atlético and in Spanish football as the so-called "Iron Curtain".

=== Atlético Madrid ===
Aparicio helped Athletic win the 1941–47 FEF President Cup, the longest tournament in the history of Spanish football, playing in all of Athletic's five matches in 1941 and also in the postponed match against Valencia CF in 1947, in which he kept a clean-sheet in a 4–0 win, thus being the only Athletic player to feature on both phases of the tournament, although Valencia also had four survivors Juan Ramón, Vicente Asensi, Amadeo, and Mundo. The trophy was presented by Armando Muñoz Calero, the president of the Royal Spanish Football Federation, who handed the cup to Aparicio, Atlético's team captain. In 1942, due to a rebellion with his club over financial disagreements, Aparicio was on the verge of joining Rayo Cantabria, a mountain team where his brothers Manuel, José, and Ángel played, the latter as a goalkeeper. When Spanish football adopted the WM tactic (3-2-2-3 scheme), he became the first colchonero central defender, as well as one of the first in Spanish football.

Aparicio remained at Atlético for a total of twelve seasons, in which he managed to win the League champion title four times in 1939–40, 1940–41, 1949–50, and 1950–51, and two predecessor titles of the current Supercopa de España: the Copa de los Campeones de España in 1940 and the Copa Eva Duarte in 1951. With four league titles, he is the player with the most leagues in the history of Atlético de Madrid. In total, Aparicio played 259 games with Atlético Madrid, including 213 in the League and 46 in the Copa del Rey, scoring four goals (three in the League).

At the end of the 1951–52 season, Aparicio accepted an offer from Boavista F.C., a Portuguese team where he scored seven goals in three games before retiring as a player. He then made his debut as a coach, incorporating the Spanish footballers Pin and Roberto Yurrita, a position that he also held for Levante in the Segunda División in 1959–60, and then Rayo Vallecano and Atlético Baleares between 1960 and 1962.

After returning to Madrid, he worked as a football agent. He subsequently returned to Atlético to occupy the honorable position of Field Delegate until his retirement, which materialized in the mid-1980s.

=== International career ===
Aparicio made his international debut for Spain in a friendly match against Portugal on 11 March 1945, starting in a 2–2 draw. He went on to earn a total of eight international caps for Spain between 1945 and 1949, all in friendlies and four of whom against Portugal, settling a bitter duel with the Portuguese striker Fernando Peyroteo, ending with a balance of 3 wins, 3 draws, and 2 losses.

His training sessions with the national team were very intense and competitive, and Aparicio recalled years later his fights with players like Telmo Zarra, but his respect and admiration went to players like Pahiño, whose skills challenged even a defender as solid as him.

== Death ==
Aparicio died in Madrid on 1 February 1999, at the age of 79.

Future footballers like Miguel González, Paco Gento, and even a young Vicente Calderón had him as their first idol. The sticker of Alfonso Aparicio became the most sought-after stickers of Atlético Madrid by children in the post-war period.

== Honours ==
Club Aviación Nacional

- La Liga: 1939–40, 1940–41
- Copa de los Campeones de España: 1940

Atlético Madrid

- La Liga: 1949–50, 1950–51
- Copa Eva Duarte: 1951
