= Cesáreo Bachiller =

Spanish footballer (1914–2004)

Personal information
- Full name: Cesáreo Bachiller Fernández
- Date of birth: 5 October 1914
- Place of birth: Buenos Aires, Argentina
- Date of death: 14 February 2004 (aged 89)
- Place of death: Gijón, Spain
- Position: Midfielder

Senior career*
Years	Team	Apps	(Gls)
1932–1933	Sporting Vilalbés		
1933–1935	Lugo Sporting		
1935–1936	Club Lemos		
1939–1940	Atlético Aviación	1	(0)
1940–1942	Granada	23	(10)
1942–1944	Sporting de Gijón		
1944	Real Madrid	0	(0)
1944–1945	Málaga		
Total		23	(10)
- * Club domestic league appearances and goals

Cesáreo Bachiller Fernández (5 October 1914 – 14 February 2004) was a Spanish footballer who played as a midfielder for Atlético Madrid, Granada, and Sporting de Gijón in the early 1940s.

== Career ==
Born in Buenos Aires on 5 October 1914, (Note: Some sources wrongly claim that he was born on 5 May 1911.) Bachiller was still a child when his family settled in Lugo, where he played for Fortuna de Lugo and Sporting Vilalbés, making his professional debut for Lugo Sporting in 1933, with whom he played in the Galician Championship, before joining Club Lemos for the 1935–36 season. The local press of the time highlighted the difference between the Bachiller who played for Lugo and the one who played for Lemos, stating that "the intelligent, but physically inept player who used to stroll around the field has now become a player who, without losing his characteristic intelligence and technical skill, plays a tough, enthusiastic, and efficient game worthy of a championship team".

Once the Spanish Civil War ended, Bachiller signed for Atlético Aviación (currently known as Atlético Madrid), with whom he only played a single match, a La Liga fixture against Celta de Vigo on 4 February 1940, helping his side to a 4–1 victory. He was thus a member of the Atlético team that won the 1939–40 La Liga, becoming one of the first five Galician footballers to win it, along with his teammates Juan Vázquez, Celso Pedro Blanco, Enrique Rubio, and Guillermo. Due to his lack of playing time, he left the club at the end of the season, joining Segunda División team Granada, with whom he played for two years, until 1942, winning the 1940–41 Segunda División, and scoring 10 goals in 23 La Liga matches during the 1941–42 season.

In 1942, Bachiller and Camilo Liz, who had been regular starters for their respective top-flight teams, initiated a move to Sporting de Gijón. This duo, which was considered one of the best at the time, played a crucial role in the Gijón team that won the Segunda División title in 1944. In his second season at Sporting, he terminated his contract and signed for Real Madrid, with whom he did not play a single match. In late 1944, he joined CD Málaga, where he retired in 1945, aged 31. He then settled in Gijón, where he opened a building materials company.

== Death ==
After his retirement, Bachiller settled in Gijón, where he set up a building materials company, and where he died on 14 February 2004, at the age of 89.

== Honours ==
Atlético Aviación

- La Liga:
  - Champions (1):1939–40

Granada

- Segunda División
  - Champions (1): 1940–41

Sporting de Gijón

- Segunda División
  - Champions (1): 1940–41
