= Germán Gómez =

Spanish footballer

Personal information
- Full name: Germán Gómez Gómez
- Date of birth: 5 January 1914
- Place of birth: Santander, Spain
- Date of death: 22 March 2004 (aged 90)
- Place of death: Madrid, Spain
- Position: Midfielder

Youth career
- Rayo Cantabria

Senior career*
Years	Team	Apps	(Gls)
- Tolosa Sport
1934–1939	Racing Santander	38	(0)
1939–1948	Atlético Madrid	175	(2)
1948–1950	Racing Santander	27	(4)
Total		240	(6)

International career
1941–1945	Spain	6	(0)

Managerial career
- 1952–1953: Gimnástica
- * Club domestic league appearances and goals

Germán Gómez Gómez (Santander, Cantabria, 5 January 1914 – Madrid, 22 March 2004) was a Spanish professional footballer who played for Racing Santander and Atlético Madrid.

== Playing career ==
Gómez joined Atlético (at that time known as (Athletic Aviación de Madrid) in 1939 from Racing, where he had played his first La Liga matches prior to the outbreak of the Spanish Civil War and a three-year interruption.

He spent eight seasons with Atléti, forming a formidable partnership with Machín and Ramón Gabilondo in the midfield. Under manager Ricardo Zamora, Gómez was able to win successive league titles and was club captain for most of his Madrid career.

After his successful spell at Atlético, Germán went back to Santander to play for Racing, retiring in 1954. He also had a stint as manager of Gimnástica de Torrelavega in his native region.

== International career ==
Germán won 6 caps with the Spain national team, making his debut in Valencia on 28 December 1941, in a 3–2 win against Switzerland.

== Honours ==
Atlético Madrid

- La Liga: 1939–40, 1940–41
