= Primitivo Villacampa =

Spanish footballer (1913–1975)

Personal information
- Birth name: Primitivo Villacampa Viscasrillas
- Date of birth: 2 July 1913
- Place of birth: Lascellas-Ponzano, Aragon, Spain
- Date of death: 11 December 1975 (aged 62)
- Place of death: Spain
- Position: Midfielder

Senior career*
| Years | Team | Apps | (Gls) |
| ?–1933 | Huesca | | |
| 1933–1936 | Real Zaragoza | | |
| 1938–1942 | Real Zaragoza | | |
| 1942–1943 | Constància | | |
| 1943–1946 | Mallorca | | |
| 1947–1949 | Atlético Zaragoza | | |
- * Club domestic league appearances and goals

Primitivo Villacampa Viscasrillas, also known as Primo (2 July 1913 – 11 December 1975), was a Spanish footballer who played as a midfielder for Real Zaragoza in the 1930s.

== Early life ==
Primitivo Villacampa was born on 2 July 1913 in the Aragon town of Lascellas-Ponzano, as the son of a carter and butcher, who moved his family to Huesca in 1921.

== Career ==
Primo began his football career in the early 1930s, at his hometown club Huesca, then in the Tercera División. On 18 December 1932, he started in the club's first-ever match against their neighbours Real Zaragoza, a league fixture at the Torrero, which ended in a resounding 15–1 loss, Zaragoza's biggest victory in an official match. However, Primo played well, so much so, that he was signed by Zaragoza shortly after, thus becoming the first footballer to play for both clubs.

Primo arrived as a central midfielder, but the club's coach Francisco González decided to place him as a left winger, which greatly improved his game. Known as El Zagal in the locker room, he was noted for his head game, which was uncommon for a winger, and for his equally uncommon way of dribbling past defenders, as he would elude them by kicking the ball against them and hurriedly collect the subsequent rebounds using his pace. However, he is best remembered for his ability to score goals from direct corner kicks; in fact, he almost always tried them instead of looking for a cross, so much so that it became his trademark.

In his first full season at Los Manos (1933–34), the club achieved the long-awaited promotion to the Segunda División, and two years later, he scored 5 goals in 22 matches as Zaragoza clinched a runner-up finish in the 1935–36 Segunda División, thus achieving promotion to the top-flight, but they were unable to make their debut there because of the outbreak of the Spanish Civil War. Zaragoza was finally able to make its top-flight debut on 3 December 1939, and two weeks later, on 17 December, he scored two Olympic goals against the eventual league champions, the Zamora-led Atlético Aviación, to help his side to a 4–3 victory; years later, however, one of Zaragoza's players, Pelayo, admitted that he had brushed the second goal with his nose. The only other known Zaragoza player to have scored directly from a corner is Saturnino Arrúa in 1978. In total, Primo scored 8 goals in 25 La Liga matches.

Primo remained loyal to Zaragoza for nearly a decade, from 1933 until 1942, when he signed for Constància, where he stayed for only one season, as he then went to Mallorca, with whom he played for three years, from 1942 until 1946.

== Death ==
Primo died on 11 December 1975, at the age of 62.

== Honours ==
Real Zaragoza

- Segunda División:
  - Runner-up (1): 1935–36
