= Supercopa de España =

Football tournament

- Organiser(s): Royal Spanish Football Federation
- Founded: 1982; 44 years ago
- Region: Spain
- Teams: 2 (until 2018); 4 (2019–present)
- Current champions: Barcelona (16th title)
- Most championships: Barcelona (16 titles)
- Broadcasters: List of broadcasters
- 2027 Supercopa de España

The Supercopa de España ("Super Cup of Spain"), also referred as Spanish Super Cup, is a super cup tournament in Spanish football. Founded in 1982 as a two-team competition, the current version has been contested since 2020 by four teams: the winners and runners-up of the Copa del Rey and La Liga.

Until 1995, a team that won both the league and cup automatically got the trophy. From 1996 to 2019, if a team won both, they had to play the cup runners-up for the Supercopa. Since its inception, thirteen teams have participated in the tournament, and ten have been crowned champions.

Barcelona is the reigning champion after defeating Real Madrid in the final of the 2026 edition held in Jeddah, Saudi Arabia. Barcelona is also the most successful team with sixteen titles, followed by Real Madrid with thirteen. Athletic Bilbao and Deportivo La Coruña each have three titles, with Deportivo notably winning every edition they have participated in. Lionel Messi is the competition's all-time top scorer and the most successful player, with eight titles.

== History ==
The current competition has existed since 1982. Between 1940 and 1953, several other tournaments between the Spanish league champions and the cup winners (then Copa del Generalísimo) were played.

In September 1940, a match with this format had the name of Copa de Campeones. It was not repeated until December 1945 when, due to the good relations with the Spanish military government the ambassador of Argentina, offered a trophy called Copa de Oro Argentina. Both these trophies were unofficial and were only played once.

In 1941, the Copa Presidente FEF was established as an official tournament founded and organized by the RFEF; however, it was also only contested once, and though 11 of the 12 matches in its mini-league format were played between April and May 1941, its last, decisive fixture was delayed until eventually taking place in September 1947.

Also in 1947, the Copa Eva Duarte was established as an annual and official tournament founded and organized by the RFEF, as a tribute to Argentine president Juan Domingo Perón and his wife María Eva Duarte de Perón. It was played between September and December, usually as one-match finals. The trophy was the predecessor of the current Supercopa de España, first held in 1982.

In 2018, the Supercopa was played for the first time as a single match hosted at a neutral venue in Tangier, Morocco.

On 12 November 2019, it was announced that the Supercopa would expand to four teams, the winners and runners-up of the Copa del Rey and La Liga, and would be held at King Abdullah Sports City in Jeddah, Saudi Arabia for the next three years, in a deal valued at €120 million. The event was also moved to January in order to reduce the "congestion" on teams' schedules. The agreement has faced criticism: Jesus Álvarez, head of sport programming for state broadcaster RTVE, stated that it would not bid for the media rights to the Supercopa, in protest of Saudi Arabia's human and women's rights records—especially in women's sports. Liga Nacional de Fútbol Profesional president Javier Tebas also criticized the decision, citing the human rights violations and the country's "pirating" of European football (in reference to pirate broadcaster beoutQ). In the past, Tebas had been a major advocate to hold the competition outside of Spain, and especially in the United States, as part of his efforts to expand La Liga globally. RFEF president Luis Rubiales stated that women would be able to attend the matches without restriction, and defended the agreement as the use of football to "transform society".

In one semi-final, the La Liga champion plays the Copa del Rey runner-up, while in the other the Copa del Rey winner plays the La Liga runner-up. Neither the Copa del Rey nor La Liga winners reached the Supercopa de España final in the first three editions of the four-team format, while Barcelona played Real Madrid in each final of the next four editions. In June 2021, the extension of the agreement with Saudi Arabia for ten years was announced, to continue playing the tournament in the country until at least 2029. Due to a conflict with the 2027 AFC Asian Cup, which Saudi Arabia will host, the 2027 Supercopa would be moved to Istanbul, Turkey.

== Predecessors of Supercopa ==
=== Early tournaments ===
Year	Winners	Winners of	Runners-up	Winners of	Score	Trophy name
1940	Atlético Madrid	1939–40 La Liga	Espanyol	1940 Copa del Generalísimo	3–3 (1st leg); 7–1 (2nd leg)	Copa de los Campeones de España (unofficial competition)
1941–47	Atlético Madrid	1940–41 La Liga	Valencia	1941 Copa del Generalísimo	4–0	Copa Presidente FEF (official competition)
1945	Barcelona	1944–45 La Liga	Athletic Bilbao	1944–45 Copa del Generalísimo	5–4	Copa de Oro Argentina (unofficial competition)

=== Copa Eva Duarte ===
Year	Winners	Winners of	Runners-up	Winners of	Score
1947	Real Madrid	1947 Copa del Generalísimo	Valencia	1946–47 La Liga	3–1
1948	Barcelona	1947–48 La Liga	Sevilla	1947–48 Copa del Generalísimo	1–0
1949	Valencia	1948–49 Copa del Generalísimo	Barcelona	1948–49 La Liga	7–4
1950	Athletic Bilbao	1949–50 Copa del Generalísimo	Atlético Madrid	1949–50 La Liga	5–5 (1st leg); 2–0 (2nd leg)
1951	Atlético Madrid	1950–51 La Liga	Barcelona	1951 Copa del Generalísimo	2–0
1952	Barcelona	1951–52 Liga & Copa	Awarded automatically for winning the Double.		
1953	Barcelona	1952–53 Liga & Copa	Awarded automatically for winning the Double.		

* In 1952 and 1953 the cup was awarded to Barcelona, as they had won the La Liga / Copa del Generalísimo double.

== Finals by year ==
=== Two-team format ===
Except for the 1983, 1988 and 1992 tournaments, the first leg match was played at the cup winner's stadium.

Year	Winners	Scores	Runners-up
1982	Real Sociedad (1981–82 La Liga)	0–1	Real Madrid (1981–82 Copa del Rey)
1982	Real Sociedad (1981–82 La Liga)	4–0	Real Madrid (1981–82 Copa del Rey)
1982	Real Sociedad won 4–1 on aggregate		
1983	Barcelona (1982–83 Copa del Rey)	3–1	Athletic Bilbao (1982–83 La Liga)
1983	Barcelona (1982–83 Copa del Rey)	0–1	Athletic Bilbao (1982–83 La Liga)
1983	Barcelona won 3–2 on aggregate		
1984	Athletic Bilbao (1983–84 Liga & Copa)	—N/a	
1984	Awarded automatically to Athletic Bilbao after they won the Double		
1985	Atlético Madrid (1984–85 Copa del Rey)	3–1	Barcelona (1984–85 La Liga)
1985	Atlético Madrid (1984–85 Copa del Rey)	0–1	Barcelona (1984–85 La Liga)
1985	Atlético Madrid won 3–2 on aggregate		
1986	Real Madrid and Zaragoza did not play		
1987	Real Madrid and Real Sociedad did not play		
1988	Real Madrid (1987–88 La Liga)	2–0	Barcelona (1987–88 Copa del Rey)
1988	Real Madrid (1987–88 La Liga)	1–2	Barcelona (1987–88 Copa del Rey)
1988	Real Madrid won 3–2 on aggregate		
1989	Real Madrid (1988–89 Liga & Copa)	—N/a	
1989	Awarded automatically to Real Madrid after they won the Double		
1990	Real Madrid (1989–90 La Liga)	1–0	Barcelona (1989–90 Copa del Rey)
1990	Real Madrid (1989–90 La Liga)	4–1	Barcelona (1989–90 Copa del Rey)
1990	Real Madrid won 5–1 on aggregate		
1991	Barcelona (1990–91 La Liga)	1–0	Atlético Madrid (1990–91 Copa del Rey)
1991	Barcelona (1990–91 La Liga)	1–1	Atlético Madrid (1990–91 Copa del Rey)
1991	Barcelona won 2–1 on aggregate		
1992	Barcelona (1991–92 La Liga)	3–1	Atlético Madrid (1991–92 Copa del Rey)
1992	Barcelona (1991–92 La Liga)	2–1	Atlético Madrid (1991–92 Copa del Rey)
1992	Barcelona won 5–2 on aggregate		
1993	Real Madrid (1992–93 Copa del Rey)	3–1	Barcelona (1992–93 La Liga)
1993	Real Madrid (1992–93 Copa del Rey)	1–1	Barcelona (1992–93 La Liga)
1993	Real Madrid won 4–2 on aggregate		
1994	Barcelona (1993–94 La Liga)	2–0	Zaragoza (1993–94 Copa del Rey)
1994	Barcelona (1993–94 La Liga)	4–5	Zaragoza (1993–94 Copa del Rey)
1994	Barcelona won 6–5 on aggregate		
1995	Deportivo La Coruña (1994–95 Copa del Rey)	3–0	Real Madrid (1994–95 La Liga)
1995	Deportivo La Coruña (1994–95 Copa del Rey)	2–1	Real Madrid (1994–95 La Liga)
1995	Deportivo won 5–1 on aggregate		
1996	Barcelona (1995–96 Copa runners-up)	5–2	Atlético Madrid (1995–96 Liga & Copa)
1996	Barcelona (1995–96 Copa runners-up)	1–3	Atlético Madrid (1995–96 Liga & Copa)
1996	Barcelona won 6–5 on aggregate		
1997	Real Madrid (1996–97 La Liga)	1–2	Barcelona (1996–97 Copa del Rey)
1997	Real Madrid (1996–97 La Liga)	4–1	Barcelona (1996–97 Copa del Rey)
1997	Real Madrid won 5–3 on aggregate		
1998	Mallorca (1997–98 Copa runners-up)	2–1	Barcelona (1997–98 Liga & Copa)
1998	Mallorca (1997–98 Copa runners-up)	1–0	Barcelona (1997–98 Liga & Copa)
1998	Mallorca won 3–1 on aggregate		
1999	Valencia (1998–99 Copa del Rey)	1–0	Barcelona (1998–99 La Liga)
1999	Valencia (1998–99 Copa del Rey)	3–3	Barcelona (1998–99 La Liga)
1999	Valencia won 4–3 on aggregate		
2000	Deportivo La Coruña (1999–2000 La Liga)	0–0	Espanyol (1999–2000 Copa del Rey)
2000	Deportivo La Coruña (1999–2000 La Liga)	2–0	Espanyol (1999–2000 Copa del Rey)
2000	Deportivo won 2–0 on aggregate		
2001	Real Madrid (2000–01 La Liga)	1–1	Zaragoza (2000–01 Copa del Rey)
2001	Real Madrid (2000–01 La Liga)	3–0	Zaragoza (2000–01 Copa del Rey)
2001	Real Madrid won 4–1 on aggregate		
2002	Deportivo La Coruña (2001–02 Copa del Rey)	3–0	Valencia (2001–02 La Liga)
2002	Deportivo La Coruña (2001–02 Copa del Rey)	1–0	Valencia (2001–02 La Liga)
2002	Deportivo won 4–0 on aggregate		
2003	Real Madrid (2002–03 La Liga)	1–2	Mallorca (2002–03 Copa del Rey)
2003	Real Madrid (2002–03 La Liga)	3–0	Mallorca (2002–03 Copa del Rey)
2003	Real Madrid won 4–2 on aggregate		
2004	Zaragoza (2003–04 Copa del Rey)	0–1	Valencia (2003–04 La Liga)
2004	Zaragoza (2003–04 Copa del Rey)	3–1	Valencia (2003–04 La Liga)
2004	Zaragoza won 3–2 on aggregate		
2005	Barcelona (2004–05 La Liga)	3–0	Real Betis (2004–05 Copa del Rey)
2005	Barcelona (2004–05 La Liga)	1–2	Real Betis (2004–05 Copa del Rey)
2005	Barcelona won 4–2 on aggregate		
2006	Barcelona (2005–06 La Liga)	1–0	Espanyol (2005–06 Copa del Rey)
2006	Barcelona (2005–06 La Liga)	3–0	Espanyol (2005–06 Copa del Rey)
2006	Barcelona won 4–0 on aggregate		
2007	Sevilla (2006–07 Copa del Rey)	1–0	Real Madrid (2006–07 La Liga)
2007	Sevilla (2006–07 Copa del Rey)	5–3	Real Madrid (2006–07 La Liga)
2007	Sevilla won 6–3 on aggregate		
2008	Real Madrid (2007–08 La Liga)	2–3	Valencia (2007–08 Copa del Rey)
2008	Real Madrid (2007–08 La Liga)	4–2	Valencia (2007–08 Copa del Rey)
2008	Real Madrid won 6–5 on aggregate		
2009	Barcelona (2008–09 Liga & Copa)	2–1	Athletic Bilbao (2008–09 Copa runners-up)
2009	Barcelona (2008–09 Liga & Copa)	3–0	Athletic Bilbao (2008–09 Copa runners-up)
2009	Barcelona won 5–1 on aggregate		
2010	Barcelona (2009–10 La Liga)	1–3	Sevilla (2009–10 Copa del Rey)
2010	Barcelona (2009–10 La Liga)	4–0	Sevilla (2009–10 Copa del Rey)
2010	Barcelona won 5–3 on aggregate		
2011	Barcelona (2010–11 La Liga)	2–2	Real Madrid (2010–11 Copa del Rey)
2011	Barcelona (2010–11 La Liga)	3–2	Real Madrid (2010–11 Copa del Rey)
2011	Barcelona won 5–4 on aggregate		
2012	Real Madrid (2011–12 La Liga)	2–3	Barcelona (2011–12 Copa del Rey)
2012	Real Madrid (2011–12 La Liga)	2–1	Barcelona (2011–12 Copa del Rey)
2012	4–4 on aggregate, Real Madrid won on away goals		
2013	Barcelona (2012–13 La Liga)	1–1	Atlético Madrid (2012–13 Copa del Rey)
2013	Barcelona (2012–13 La Liga)	0–0	Atlético Madrid (2012–13 Copa del Rey)
2013	1–1 on aggregate, Barcelona won on away goals		
2014	Atlético Madrid (2013–14 La Liga)	1–1	Real Madrid (2013–14 Copa del Rey)
2014	Atlético Madrid (2013–14 La Liga)	1–0	Real Madrid (2013–14 Copa del Rey)
2014	Atlético Madrid won 2–1 on aggregate		
2015	Athletic Bilbao (2014–15 Copa runners-up)	4–0	Barcelona (2014–15 Liga & Copa)
2015	Athletic Bilbao (2014–15 Copa runners-up)	1–1	Barcelona (2014–15 Liga & Copa)
2015	Athletic Bilbao won 5–1 on aggregate		
2016	Barcelona (2015–16 Liga & Copa)	2–0	Sevilla (2015–16 Copa runners-up)
2016	Barcelona (2015–16 Liga & Copa)	3–0	Sevilla (2015–16 Copa runners-up)
2016	Barcelona won 5–0 on aggregate		
2017	Real Madrid (2016–17 La Liga)	3–1	Barcelona (2016–17 Copa del Rey)
2017	Real Madrid (2016–17 La Liga)	2–0	Barcelona (2016–17 Copa del Rey)
2017	Real Madrid won 5–1 on aggregate		
2018	Barcelona (2017–18 Liga & Copa)	2–1	Sevilla (2017–18 Copa runners-up)
2018	A single-leg final was played at Ibn Batouta Stadium, Tangier, Morocco		

=== Four-team format ===
Year	Winners	Score	Runners-up	Semi-finalists	Venue(s)
2019	Real Madrid (2018–19 Liga third place)	0–0 (a.e.t.) (4–1 pen.)	Atlético Madrid (2018–19 Liga runners-up)	Valencia (2018–19 Copa Winners)	King Abdullah Sports City, Jeddah, Saudi Arabia
2019	Real Madrid (2018–19 Liga third place)	0–0 (a.e.t.) (4–1 pen.)	Atlético Madrid (2018–19 Liga runners-up)	Barcelona (2018–19 Liga Winners & 2018–19 Copa Runners-up)	King Abdullah Sports City, Jeddah, Saudi Arabia
2020	Athletic Bilbao (2019–20 Copa runners-up) (Note: Outcome of the 2020 Copa del Rey final was not known at the time of the 2021 Supercopa de España being played, reaching it granted qualification to both finalists.)	3–2 (a.e.t.)	Barcelona (2019–20 Liga runners-up)	Real Sociedad (2019–20 Copa Winners)	Estadio Nuevo Arcángel, Córdoba, Spain; Estadio La Rosaleda, Málaga, Spain; Estadio La Cartuja, Seville, Spain
2020	Athletic Bilbao (2019–20 Copa runners-up)	3–2 (a.e.t.)	Barcelona (2019–20 Liga runners-up)	Real Madrid (2019–20 Liga Winners)	Estadio Nuevo Arcángel, Córdoba, Spain; Estadio La Rosaleda, Málaga, Spain; Estadio La Cartuja, Seville, Spain
2021	Real Madrid (2020–21 Liga runners-up)	2–0	Athletic Bilbao (2020–21 Copa runners-up)	Barcelona (2020–21 Copa Winners)	King Fahd International Stadium, Riyadh, Saudi Arabia
2021	Real Madrid (2020–21 Liga runners-up)	2–0	Athletic Bilbao (2020–21 Copa runners-up)	Atlético Madrid (2020–21 Liga Winners)	King Fahd International Stadium, Riyadh, Saudi Arabia
2022	Barcelona (2021–22 Liga runners-up)	3–1	Real Madrid (2021–22 Liga Winners)	Valencia (2021–22 Copa runners-up)	King Fahd International Stadium, Riyadh, Saudi Arabia
2022	Barcelona (2021–22 Liga runners-up)	3–1	Real Madrid (2021–22 Liga Winners)	Real Betis (2021–22 Copa Winners)	King Fahd International Stadium, Riyadh, Saudi Arabia
2023	Real Madrid (2022–23 Copa Winners & 2022–23 Liga runners-up)	4–1	Barcelona (2022–23 Liga Winners)	Atlético Madrid (2022–23 Liga third place)	King Saud University Stadium, Riyadh, Saudi Arabia
2023	Real Madrid (2022–23 Copa Winners & 2022–23 Liga runners-up)	4–1	Barcelona (2022–23 Liga Winners)	Osasuna (2022–23 Copa runners-up)	King Saud University Stadium, Riyadh, Saudi Arabia
2024	Barcelona (2023–24 Liga runners-up)	5–2	Real Madrid (2023–24 Liga Winners)	Athletic Bilbao (2023–24 Copa Winners)	King Abdullah Sports City, Jeddah, Saudi Arabia
2024	Barcelona (2023–24 Liga runners-up)	5–2	Real Madrid (2023–24 Liga Winners)	Mallorca (2023–24 Copa runners-up)	King Abdullah Sports City, Jeddah, Saudi Arabia
2025	Barcelona (2024–25 Copa & 2024–25 Liga Winners)	3–2	Real Madrid (2024–25 Copa & 2024–25 Liga runners-up)	Athletic Bilbao (2024–25 Liga fourth place)	King Abdullah Sports City, Jeddah, Saudi Arabia
2025	Barcelona (2024–25 Copa & 2024–25 Liga Winners)	3–2	Real Madrid (2024–25 Copa & 2024–25 Liga runners-up)	Atlético Madrid (2024–25 Liga third place)	King Abdullah Sports City, Jeddah, Saudi Arabia
2026					Şükrü Saracoğlu Stadium, Istanbul, Turkey; Beşiktaş Stadium, Istanbul, Turkey; Rams Park, Istanbul, Turkey

== Titles by club ==
=== Titles by club in Supercopa ===
Club	Winners	Runners-up	Semi-finalists	Years won	Years runner-up	Years semi-finalist
Barcelona	16	12	2	1983, 1991, 1992, 1994, 1996, 2005, 2006, 2009, 2010, 2011, 2013, 2016, 2018, 2023, 2025, 2026	1985, 1988, 1990, 1993, 1997, 1998, 1999, 2012, 2015, 2017, 2021, 2024	2020, 2022
Real Madrid	13	8	1	1988, 1989, 1990, 1993, 1997, 2001, 2003, 2008, 2012, 2017, 2020, 2022, 2024	1982, 1995, 2007, 2011, 2014, 2023, 2025, 2026	2021
Athletic Bilbao	3	3	2	1984, 2015, 2021	1983, 2009, 2022	2025, 2026
Deportivo La Coruña	3	–	–	1995, 2000, 2002	–	–
Atlético Madrid	2	5	3	1985, 2014	1991, 1992, 1996, 2013, 2020	2022, 2024, 2026
Valencia	1	3	2	1999	2002, 2004, 2008	2020, 2023
Sevilla	1	3	–	2007	2010, 2016, 2018	–
Zaragoza	1	2	–	2004	1994, 2001	–
Mallorca	1	1	1	1998	2003	2025
Real Sociedad	1	–	1	1982	–	2021
Espanyol	–	2	–	–	2000, 2006	–
Real Betis	–	1	1	–	2005	2023
Osasuna	–	–	1	–	–	2024

=== Titles by club in predecessors of Supercopa ===
Club	Winners	Runners-up	Years won	Years lost
Barcelona	4	2	1945, 1948, 1952, 1953	1949, 1951
Atlético Madrid	3	1	1940, 1941, 1951	1950
Valencia	1	2	1949	1941, 1947
Athletic Bilbao	1	1	1950	1945
Real Madrid	1	–	1947	–
Espanyol	–	1	–	1940
Sevilla	–	1	–	1948

== All-time top goalscorers ==
As of 12 January 2026

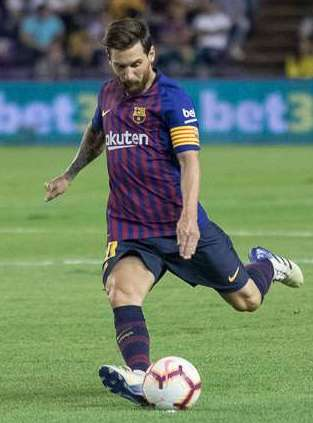
Lionel Messi is the all-time highest appearance maker and top scorer in the competition's history

- **Bold** indicates active players in Spanish football.

Player	Club(s)	Goals	Apps	Ref.
(Argentina) Lionel Messi	Barcelona	14	20	
(Spain) Raúl	Real Madrid	7	12	
(France) Karim Benzema	Real Madrid	7	13	
(Brazil) **Raphinha**	Barcelona	6	7	
(Poland) Robert Lewandowski	Barcelona	6	7	
(Bulgaria) Hristo Stoichkov	Barcelona	6	10	
(Spain) Txiki Begiristain	Real Sociedad, Barcelona, Deportivo La Coruña	6	12	
(Mali) Frédéric Kanouté	Sevilla	5	2	
(Brazil) **Vinícius Júnior**	Real Madrid	5	12	
(Spain) Aritz Aduriz	Athletic Bilbao	4	2	
(France) **Antoine Griezmann**	Atlético Madrid, Barcelona	4	7	
(Portugal) Cristiano Ronaldo	Real Madrid	4	7	
(Spain) José Mari Bakero	Real Sociedad, Barcelona	4	11	
(Brazil) **Rodrygo**	Real Madrid	4	11	
(Spain) Xavi	Barcelona	4	14	

=== Consecutive wins ===
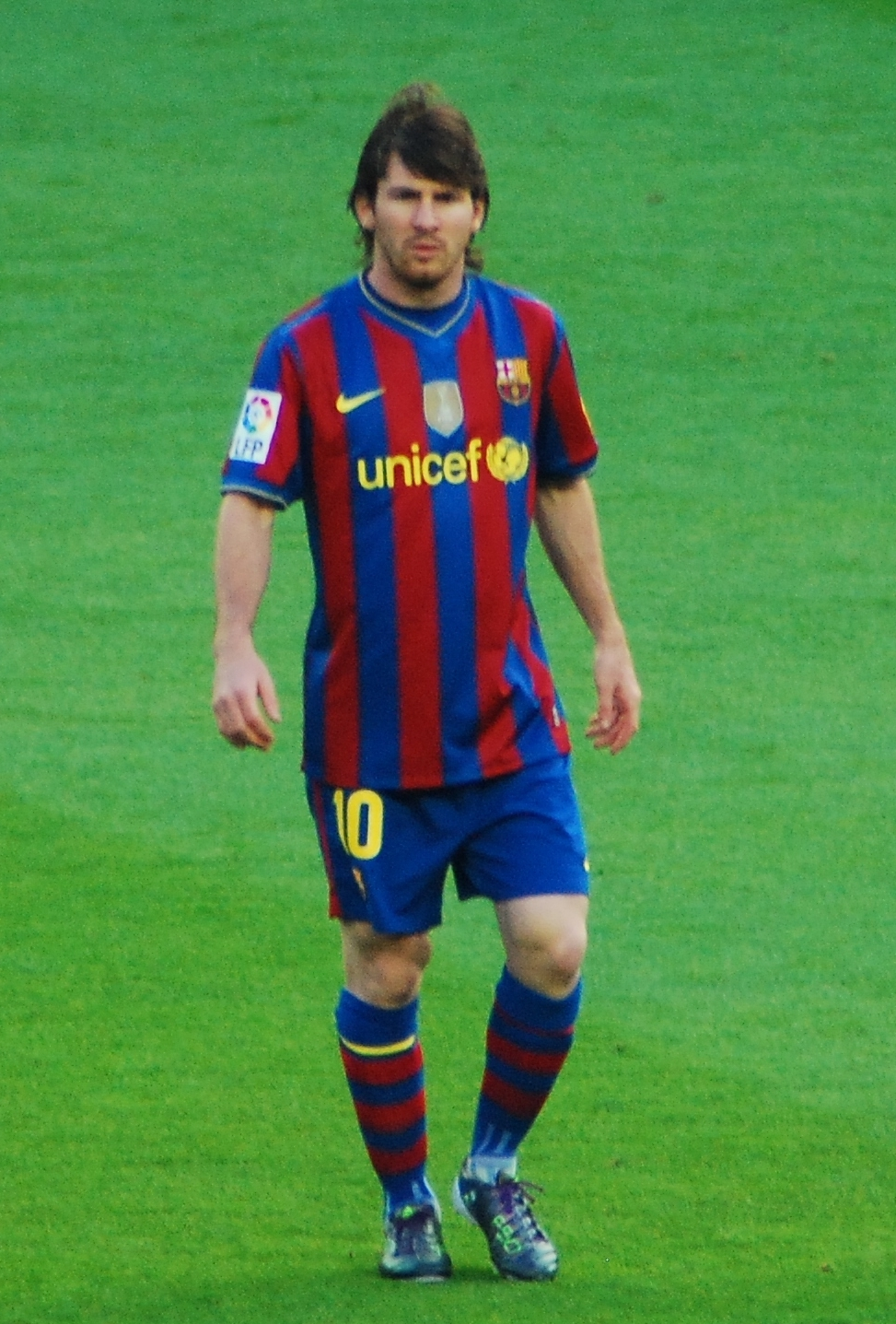
Lionel Messi is the only player in history to win five consecutive Pichichi trophies, all with Barcelona (2017–2021).

Player	Wins	Seasons
(Argentina) Lionel Messi	5	2016–17, 2017–18, 2018–19, 2019–20, 2020–21
(Spain) Alfredo Di Stéfano	4	1955–56, 1956–57, 1957–58, 1958–59
(Mexico) Hugo Sánchez	4	1984–85, 1985–86, 1986–87, 1987–88
(Spain) Sonia Bermúdez	4	2011–12, 2012–13, 2013–14, 2014–15
(Spain) Isidro Lángara	3	1933–34, 1934–35, 1935–36
(Spain) Telmo Zarra	3	1944–45, 1945–46, 1946–47
(Spain) José Eulogio Gárate	3	1968–69, 1969–70, 1970–71
(Spain) Quini	3	1979–80, 1980–81, 1981–82
(Spain) Jenni Hermoso	3	2018–19, 2019–20, 2020–21

== See also ==
- Football in Spain
