= Juan Escudero =

Spanish footballer

Personal information
- Full name: Juan Escudero Bueno
- Date of birth: 25 September 1920
- Place of birth: Salamanca, Spain
- Date of death: 3 January 2012 (aged 91)
- Position: Midfielder

Senior career*
Years	Team	Apps	(Gls)
1939–1943	Athletic Aviación de Madrid	27	(0)
- * Club domestic league appearances and goals

Juan Escudero Bueno (25 September 1920 – 3 January 2012) was a Spanish professional footballer who played as a midfielder for Athletic Aviación de Madrid, winning the La Liga in 1940 and 1941.
