= Enrique Rubio =

Enrique Rubio may refer to:

- Enrique Rubio (footballer) (1915–1991), Spanish footballer
- Enrique Rubio (politician) (born 1943), Uruguayan teacher, writer, and politician
