= Gabilondo =

Gabilondo may refer to:

- Ángel Gabilondo (born 1949), Spanish politician, brother of Iñaki
- Igor Gabilondo (born 1979), Spanish retired footballer
- Iñaki Gabilondo (born 1942), Spanish journalist and TV news anchor, brother of Ángel
- Ramón Gabilondo (1913–2004), Spanish footballer
- Francisco Gabilondo Soler (1907–1990), Mexican composer and performer of children's songs
