= Copa de Oro Argentina =

Barcelona	Athletic Bilbao
5	4
- Date: 23 December 1945
- Venue: Camp de Les Corts, Barcelona
- Referee: Julián Arqué

The Copa de Oro Argentina was a Spanish football competition, held once on 23 December 1945 as a one-off game between FC Barcelona (winner of the 1944–45 La Liga) and Athletic Bilbao (winner of the 1944–45 Copa del Generalísimo), with Barcelona winning 5–4 at their Camp de Les Corts stadium.

The match was organised by the Catalan Football Federation on the initiative of the Argentine consulate in Barcelona, with the trophy being provided by the city's Argentine community.

It was the second super cup in Spanish football, after the one-off Copa de los Campeones de España in 1940. Both competitions are considered with their friendly nature as unofficial; a view also shared by the Spanish football historian Ricardo Uribarri. In 1947, the first official tournament was played, the Copa Eva Duarte which ran to 1953. The current Supercopa de España began in 1982.

== Participants ==
Team	Qualification
Barcelona	Winner of 1944–45 La Liga
Athletic Bilbao	Winner of 1944–45 Copa del Generalísimo

== Match details ==
23 December 1945

Barcelona	5–4	Athletic Bilbao
César 15', 67'; Gamoral 28', 43'; Bravo 72'	Report	Urra 6'; Zarra 13', 86'; Panizo 33'

Camp de Les Corts, Barcelona
Referee: Julián Arqué

Barcelona
Athletic Bilbao

GK	(Spain) Juan Zambudio Velasco
DF	(Spain) Curta
DF	(Spain) Joan Sans Alsina
DF	(Spain) Jaume Elías
MF	(Spain) José Gonzalvo
MF	(Spain) Mariano Gonzalvo
FW	(Spain) Mariano Martín
FW	(Spain) José Bravo
FW	(Spain) Josep Escolà
FW	(Spain) César
FW	(Spain) Luis Gamoral Gago
Manager:
(Spain) Josep Samitier

GK	(Spain) Raimundo Lezama
DF	(Spain) Nando
DF	(Spain) Roberto Bertol
DF	(Spain) Miguel Gaínza
MF	(Spain) Luis Bergareche
MF	(Spain) Manuel Barrenechea
FW	(Spain) Isidoro Urra
FW	(Spain) José Luis Panizo
FW	(Spain) Menchaca Bilbao
FW	(Spain) Rafael Iriondo
FW	(Spain) Zarra
Manager:
(Spain) Juan Urquizu

== See also ==
- Athletic–Barcelona clásico
- Supercopa de España
- Copa Eva Duarte
- Copa de los Campeones de España
