= Julio Elícegui =

Spanish footballer

Personal information
- Full name: Julio Antonio Elícegui Cans
- Date of birth: 5 December 1910
- Place of birth: Castejón, Spain
- Date of death: 31 August 2001 (aged 90)
- Place of death: A Coruña, Spain
- Position: Forward

Youth career
- Arin Sport
- Azkoyen
- Beasain

Senior career*
Years	Team	Apps	(Gls)
1930–1933	Unión Irún	37	(41)
1933–1940	Athletic Aviación	60	(41)
1940–1943	Deportivo La Coruña	36	(35)
1943–1944	Gimnàstic		

International career
1933	Spain	4	(6)
- * Club domestic league appearances and goals

Julio Antonio Elícegui Cans (5 December 1910 — 31 August 2001) was a Spanish footballer who played as a forward.

== Club career ==
Elícegui began his career playing youth football for Arin Sport, Azkoyen, and Beasain, before signing for Real Unión in 1930. In 1931, the club changed its name to Unión Irún, as a result of the proclamation of the Second Spanish Republic and was relegated to the Segunda División at the end of the 1931–32 La Liga season. Elícegui finished the 1932–33 Segunda División season as top scorer, with 30 goals from 18 games, including scoring five for Unión Irún in a 6–0 victory over Castellón on 12 March 1933.

In the summer of 1933, Elícegui signed for Athletic Madrid for 50,000 Ptas, winning promotion from the Segunda División in his first season at the club, scoring 15 league goals in the process. In 1936, Elícegui's career was put on hold, due to the Spanish Civil War, where Elícegui took up a colonel role in northern Spain. In 1939, following the resumption of football, Elícegui remained at Athletic Madrid, now renamed Athletic Aviación, winning the 1939–40 La Liga title.

In 1940, Elícegui joined Segunda División club Deportivo La Coruña, winning promotion back to La Liga in 1941, scoring 26 goals in 18 games. Elícegui remained at the club for two more seasons, joining Gimnàstic for a short spell in 1943, before retiring due to an ankle injury.

== International career ==
On 2 April 1933, Elícegui made his debut for Spain, scoring twice, in a 3–0 win against Portugal. Elícegui scored a hat-trick in his final appearance for Spain on 21 May 1933, in a 13–0 win against Bulgaria.

=== International goals ===
Scores and results list Spain's goal tally first.

List of international goals scored by Elícegui
No.	Date	Venue	Opponent	Score	Result	Competition
1	2 April 1933	Balaídos, Vigo, Spain	Portugal	2–0	3–0	Friendly
2	2 April 1933	Balaídos, Vigo, Spain	Portugal	3–0	3–0	Friendly
3	30 April 1933	Stadion SK Jugoslavija, Belgrade, Yugoslavia	Yugoslavia	1–0	1–1	Friendly
4	21 May 1933	Estadio Chamartín, Madrid, Spain	Bulgaria	5–0	13–0	Friendly
5	21 May 1933	Estadio Chamartín, Madrid, Spain	Bulgaria	6–0	13–0	Friendly
6	21 May 1933	Estadio Chamartín, Madrid, Spain	Bulgaria	8–0	13–0	Friendly
