= Ramón Gabilondo =

Spanish footballer and manager

Personal information
- Full name: Ramón Gabilondo Alberdi
- Date of birth: 15 March 1913
- Place of birth: Eibar, Spain
- Date of death: 16 September 2004 (aged 91)
- Place of death: Madrid, Spain
- Position: Midfielder

Youth career
- Eibarresa
- 1928–1930: Valladolid

Senior career*
| Years | Team | Apps | (Gls) |
| 1930–1934 | Valladolid | | |
| 1934–1946 | Atlético Madrid | 162 | (12) |

International career
| 1941–1942 | Spain | 5 | (0) |

Managerial career
- 1959–1960: Spain U21
- 1959–1960: Spain
- * Club domestic league appearances and goals

Ramón Gabilondo Alberdi (15 March 1913 – 16 September 2004) was a Spanish footballer who played as a midfielder.

In a career interrupted by the Spanish Civil War, he won La Liga twice in a row with Atlético Madrid in 1939-40 and 1940-41. He also won 5 caps for Spain and was later joint head coach of the national team in 1960.
