= Paco Campos =

Spanish footballer and manager

Personal information
- Full name: Francisco Campos Salamanca
- Date of birth: 8 March 1916
- Place of birth: Las Palmas, Spain
- Date of death: 8 September 1995 (aged 79)
- Place of death: Madrid, Spain
- Height: 1.81 m (5 ft 11 1/2 in)
- Position: Forward

Youth career
- 1934–1936: Marino F.C.
- 1939: Atlético Madrid

Senior career*
Years	Team	Apps	(Gls)
1940–1948	Atlético Madrid	193	(144)
1948–1952	Sporting Gijón	82	(68)
Total		275	(212)

International career
1941–1942	Spain	6	(5)

Managerial career
- 1950: Sporting Gijón
- 1954–1955: Sporting Gijón
- 1957–1958: Badajoz
- 1960–1961: Salamanca
- 1961–1962: Las Palmas
- 1963–1964: Tenerife
- * Club domestic league appearances and goals

Francisco Campos Salamanca (8 March 1916 – 8 September 1995) was a Spanish footballer who played as a forward. With 127 goals, 120 of which were for Atlético Madrid, he is the highest scoring player from the Canary Islands in La Liga.

== Club career ==
Born in Las Palmas, Canary Islands, he began his career in 1934 with Marino F.C., one of the clubs which fused to create UD Las Palmas.

After the Spanish Civil War, he moved to Atlético Aviación (now Atlético Madrid), with whom he debuted on 7 January 1940 in a Madrid derby against Real Madrid. His first goals were a brace on 4 February in a 4–1 win against Celta de Vigo, and on 8 March he scored a hat-trick against Real Zaragoza as Atlético won 5–1. He finished his first season with 8 goals from 17 appearances, and Atlético won the league.

Atlético retained the league the following season, and Campos scored 16 in 24 games. His most prolific season was 1941–42, with 20 goals in 25 games. In the late 1940s, he was part of the Delantera de la Seda frontline with José Juncosa, Alfonso Silva, Antonio Vidal Caturla and Adrián Escudero.

He scored 12 goals in Madrid derbies, the most by an Atlético player. (nine in the league, and another three in the cup).

After nine seasons at Atlético, he joined Sporting de Gijón who had just been relegated to the Segunda División. He was their player-manager for the second half of the 1949–50 season, and the following season was part of their team which gained promotion. He scored 7 goals in 11 games on their return to La Liga in 1951–52 and then retired.

== International career ==
Campos made his debut on 12 January 1941 in a 2–2 friendly draw with Portugal in Lisbon. He followed this game with five goals in his next four internationals, including a brace in a 4–0 win against France at the Estadio de Nervión in Seville on 15 March 1942, eventually finishing with 5 goals from 6 internationals.

=== International goals ===
Scores and results list Spain's goal tally first.

No.	Date	Venue	Opponent	Score	Result	Competition
1.	16 March 1941	Estadio de San Mamés, Bilbao, Spain	Portugal	3–0	5–1	Friendly
2.	28 December 1941	Mestalla, Valencia, Spain	Switzerland	1–0	3–2	Friendly
3.	15 March 1942	Estadio de Nervión, Seville, Spain	France	1–0	4–0	Friendly
4.	15 March 1942	Estadio de Nervión, Seville, Spain	France	3–0	4–0	Friendly
5.	12 April 1942	Olympiastadion, Berlin, Germany	Germany	1–1	1–1	Friendly

== Managerial career ==
In his native Canary Islands, Campos managed UD Las Palmas in the 1961–62 Segunda División and CD Tenerife in the same league in 1963–64.

== Honours ==
Atlético Madrid

- La Liga: 1939–40, 1940–41
- Copa de Campeones: 1940

Real Gijón

- Segunda División: 1950–51
