= Juan Vázquez (footballer) =

Spanish footballer (1912–1957)

Personal information
- Full name: Juan Vázquez Tenreiro
- Date of birth: 14 July 1912
- Place of birth: Ferrol, Spain
- Date of death: 22 April 1957 (aged 44)
- Position: Forward

Senior career*
Years	Team	Apps	(Gls)
1934–1935	Racing Ferrol	13	(7)
1935–1936	Deportivo La Coruña	14	(5)
19XX–1939	Aviación Nacional		
1939–1947	Atlético Madrid	136	(25)
1947–1951	Celta	94	(28)
1952	Racing Ferrol	1	(0)
Total		258	(65)

International career
1941	Spain	1	(0)

Managerial career
- 1952–1957: Racing Ferrol
- * Club domestic league appearances and goals

Juan Vázquez Tenreiro (14 July 1912 — 14 April 1957) was a Spanish footballer who played as a forward.

He earned his only international cap for Spain on 16 March 1941 in a 5–1 friendly win over Portugal at the Estadio de San Mamés in Bilbao, as an Atlético Madrid (then known as Atlético Aviación) player.
