= Ricardo Zamora =

Spanish footballer (1901–1978)

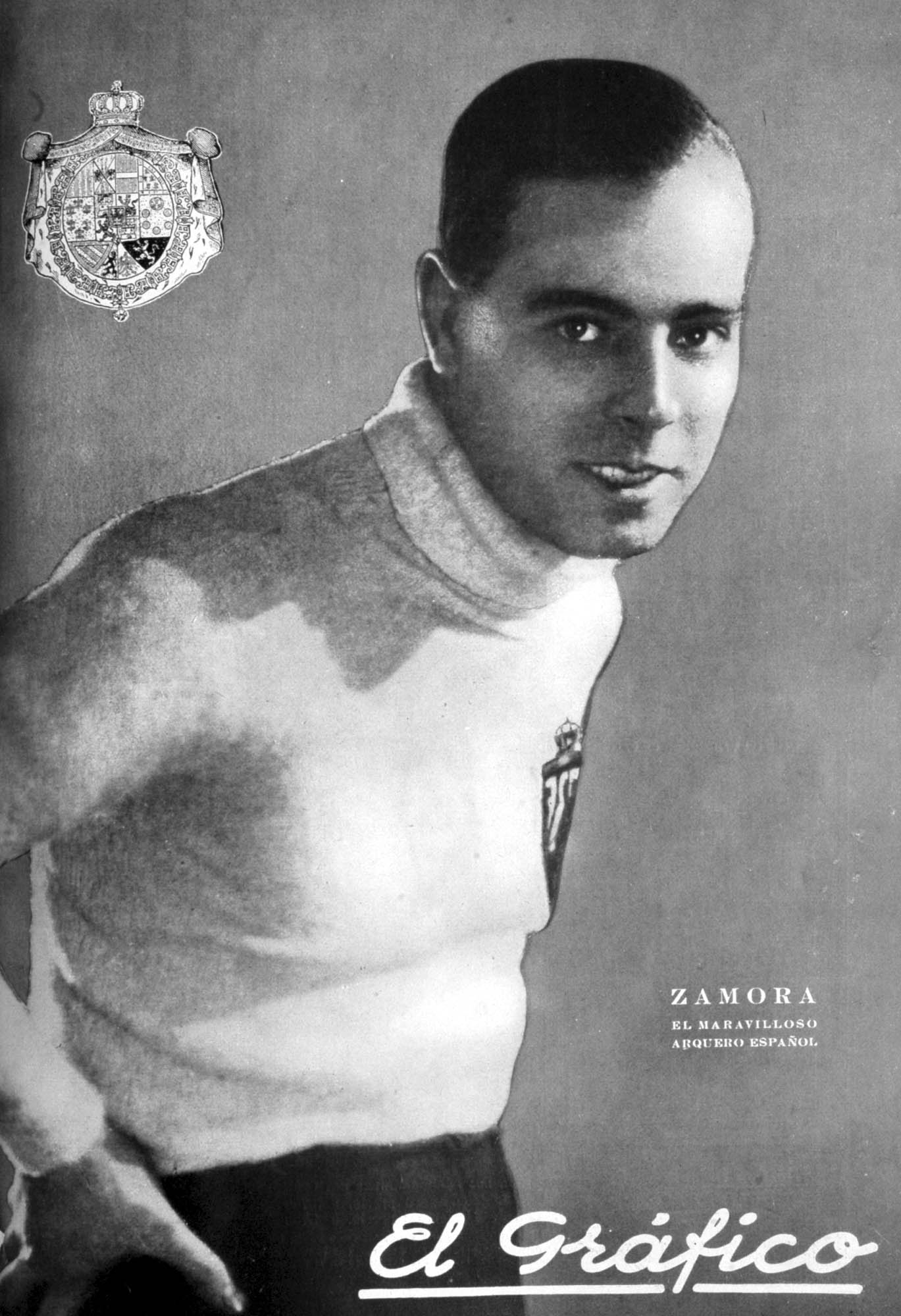
- Zamora on the cover of Argentine sports magazine El Gráfico in June 1926

Personal information
- Full name: Ricardo Zamora Martínez
- Date of birth: 21 January 1901
- Place of birth: Barcelona, Spain
- Date of death: 8 September 1978 (aged 77)
- Place of death: Barcelona, Spain
- Height: 1.81 m (5 ft 11 in)
- Position: Goalkeeper

Youth career
- 1914–1916: Universitari SC

Senior career*
Years	Team	Apps	(Gls)
1916–1919	Espanyol	48	(0)
1919–1922	Barcelona	38	(0)
1922–1930	Espanyol	126	(0)
1930–1936	Real Madrid	82	(0)
1937–1938	Nice	9	(0)
Total		303	(0)

International career
1920–1936	Spain	46	(0)

Managerial career
- 1937–1938: Nice
- 1939–1940: Atlético Aviación
- 1940–1946: Atlético Aviación
- 1946–1949: Celta
- 1949–1951: Málaga
- 1951–1952: Spain
- 1953–1955: Celta
- 1955–1957: Espanyol
- 1960: Celta
- 1961: Espanyol
Medal record
Men's football
Representing Spain
Olympic Games
Silver medal – second place	1920 Antwerp	Team competition
- * Club domestic league appearances and goals

Ricardo Zamora Martínez (Spanish pronunciation: [riˈkaɾðo θaˈmoɾa maɾˈtineθ]; 21 January 1901 – 8 September 1978) was a Spanish football player and manager. He played as a goalkeeper for, among others, RCD Espanyol, FC Barcelona and Real Madrid. As an international he played for Spain. As a manager, he won two La Liga titles with Atlético Madrid (then Atlético Aviación) and briefly managed Spain.

== Club career ==
=== Espanyol ===
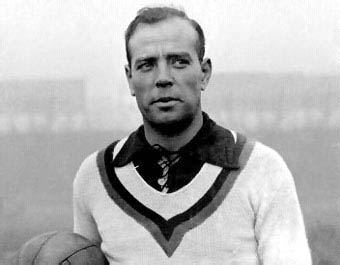
Zamora with Espanyol, where he debuted

Born in Barcelona, Spain, Zamora began his career as a junior with Universitari SC before signing for Espanyol in 1916, at the age of fifteen, after playing a series of friendly matches with the club. He made his debut for the club on 23 April 1916 against Madrid FC (now Real Madrid CF), keeping a clean sheet in a goalless draw. He then helped Espanyol win the Campionat de Catalunya in 1918. Zamora never had the support of his parents to play football because they wanted him to focus on studying medicine like his father, but his teammates such as Pakán encouraged him to keep playing. But even so, in 1919, he decided to resume his studies, at the will of his family, so he abandoned the ranks of Espanyol. However, he resumed the activity shortly after due to a large offer from local rivals FC Barcelona, which he accepted despite his family's opposition and an argument with Espanyol's board.

I had promised my parents that I would give up football to finish my studies. But my friends kept telling me to play and then the Barça board came to talk to me. It didn't take long for them to convince me to take my boots and gloves back.

— Ricardo Zamora

After three successful seasons at Barça he returned to Espanyol in 1922. On 2 February 1929, he made his La Liga debut with Espanyol during the competition's inaugural season. In the same year, under the management of Jack Greenwell and together with Ricardo Saprissa, he helped the club win both the Campionat de Catalunya and their first ever Copa del Rey in 1929, after beating the likes of Atlético Madrid in the quarter-finals, the soon-to-be La Liga champions Barcelona in the semi-finals and Real Madrid 2–1 in the final. After playing 26 La Liga games for Espanyol, he joined Real Madrid in 1930.

=== Barcelona ===
Between 1919 and 1922 Zamora was a prominent member of the legendary FC Barcelona team, coached by Jack Greenwell, that also included his close friend Josep Samitier, Sagibarba, Paulino Alcántara and Félix Sesúmaga. During his time at Barcelona, he helped the team win the Campionat de Catalunya three times and the Copa del Rey twice in 1920 and 1922, keeping a clean-sheet in the 1920 final in a 2–0 win over Pichichi's Athletic Bilbao.

=== Real Madrid ===
In 1930, Zamora signed for Real Madrid. He was one of several new arrivals, and among the others was Jacinto Quincoces. During the 1931–32 season they helped the club win La Liga for the first time. The following season Zamora and Quincoces were joined at the club by Josep Samitier and the trio helped Real retain the title. In 1934 Francisco Bru took over as the Real coach and he guided Zamora and company to victory in two Copa de España finals. In the 1934 final they beat a Valencia CF team coached by Jack Greenwell 2–1. The 1936 final saw Real Madrid meet FC Barcelona for the first time in a cup final, and despite playing with ten men for most of the game, the Madrid club beat Barça 2–1 at the Mestalla. Barça's attempts to equalize in the final minutes were thwarted by Zamora's spectacular save from Josep Escolà.

== International career ==
=== Spain ===
In 1920 together with Josep Samitier, Félix Sesúmaga, Pichichi and José María Belauste, Zamora was a member of the first ever Spain national team. The squad, coached by Francisco Bru, won the silver medal at the 1920 Olympic Games. Zamora subsequently made 46 official appearances for Spain, including in the infamous game against England on 15 May 1929, in which England took a 2-0 lead within 20 minutes following mistakes from him, who had injured his sternum early on, but despite that he carried on playing and Spain won the game 4–3, becoming the first team from outside the British Isles to defeat England. Zamora also represented Spain at the 1934 World Cup.

Zamora was also Spain's most capped player for 45 years until being surpassed by José Ángel Iribar.

=== Catalan XI ===
Zamora also played at least 13 games for the Catalan XI. However, records from the era do not always include accurate statistics and he may have played more. Together with Paulino Alcántara, Sagibarba and Josep Samitier, he helped the Catalan XI win two tournaments of the Prince of Asturias Cup, an official inter-regional competition organized by the RFEF, winning in 1923-24 and 1926.

== Player profile ==
=== Style of play ===
Zamora, nicknamed El Divino, was noted for wearing a cloth cap and a white polo-neck jumper on the field, a look later copied by several of his contemporaries. He claimed it was to protect him from both the sun and his opponents. As a goalkeeper, he was primarily known for his athleticism, quick reflexes, shot-stopping abilities, large frame, and bravery in goal. In 1929 while playing for Spain against England, he carried on playing despite breaking his sternum. Spain won the game 4–3, becoming the first team from outside the British Isles to defeat England. Zamora is also remembered for a spectacular last-minute save he made in the 1936 Copa del Rey final while playing for Real Madrid against FC Barcelona.

=== Legacy ===
Regarded as one of the greatest goalkeepers of his generation, along with Gianpiero Combi and František Plánička, as well as one of the greatest of all time, in 1999, the IFFHS elected Zamora as the best Spanish goalkeeper – as well as the fourth best in Europe and fifth best overall – of the twentieth century; in the same year, he was voted one of the greatest players of the 20th century by World Soccer magazine. The award for the best goalkeeper in La Liga, the Ricardo Zamora Trophy, is named in his honour.

== Spanish Civil War Prisoner ==
In July 1936 during the early days of the Spanish Civil War, ABC falsely reported that Zamora had been killed by Republicans. The Nationalists then attempted to exploit this as propaganda. However, Zamora was alive and well and, as rumours began to spread of his death, he was arrested by Republican militia and then imprisoned at the Modelo prison. Among his fellow prisoners were Ramón Serrano Súñer and Rafael Sánchez Mazas. His life was saved by both the actions of the prison governor Melchor Rodríguez García and because of his own willingness to play and talk football with the guards. Zamora was eventually released after the Argentinian Embassy interceded on his behalf. He then made his way to France where he was reunited with Josep Samitier at OGC Nice. He later returned to Spain and on 8 December 1938 played for a Spain XI against Real Sociedad in a benefit game for Nationalist soldiers.

In the 1950s, the Franco regime awarded Zamora the Great Cross of the Order of Cisneros, a medal created in 1944 to reward "political merit."

== Controversies ==
Zamora was also the subject of controversy throughout his career. He allegedly enjoyed drinking Cognac and smoking up to three packs of cigarettes a day. During the 1920 Olympic Games he was sent off against Italy after punching an opponent and on the way back from the same tournament he was arrested, imprisoned and fined for attempting to smuggle Havana cigars. In 1922 he was suspended for a year when he lied to the tax authorities about the signing on fee he received when he returned to RCD Espanyol. He also received 40,000 pesetas of the 150,000 peseta fee that took him from Espanyol to Real Madrid.

Zamora's ostensible political allegiances were also the subject of debate and controversy. In 1934, he was awarded an Order of the Republic medal by his namesake Niceto Alcalá-Zamora, president of the Second Spanish Republic, while during the Spanish Civil War he was exploited by Nationalist propagandists and he played in a benefit game for their cause. During the 1950s he was awarded the Great Cross of the Order of Cisneros by the Franco regime.

== Coaching career ==
In 1939 Zamora was appointed coach of Atlético Madrid, then known as Athletic Aviación and later to become Atlético Aviación, following a merger with Aviación Nacional, a Spanish Air Force team. With Zamora as manager, the club won their first La Liga in 1940 and then retained the title in 1941. In 1946 he moved to Celta de Vigo and during the 1947–48, he led a Celta team that included Pahiño and Miguel Muñoz to fourth in La Liga and the Copa del Generalísimo final. In June 1952 he coached Spain for two games. In 1953 was hired as coach by La Salle F.C. of Caracas (Venezuela). He later returned to Celta de Vigo and then had two spells as coach at Espanyol.

== Personal life ==
Zamora died on 8 September 1978 in Barcelona. His son, Ricardo Zamora de Grassa, was also a footballer.

== Honours ==
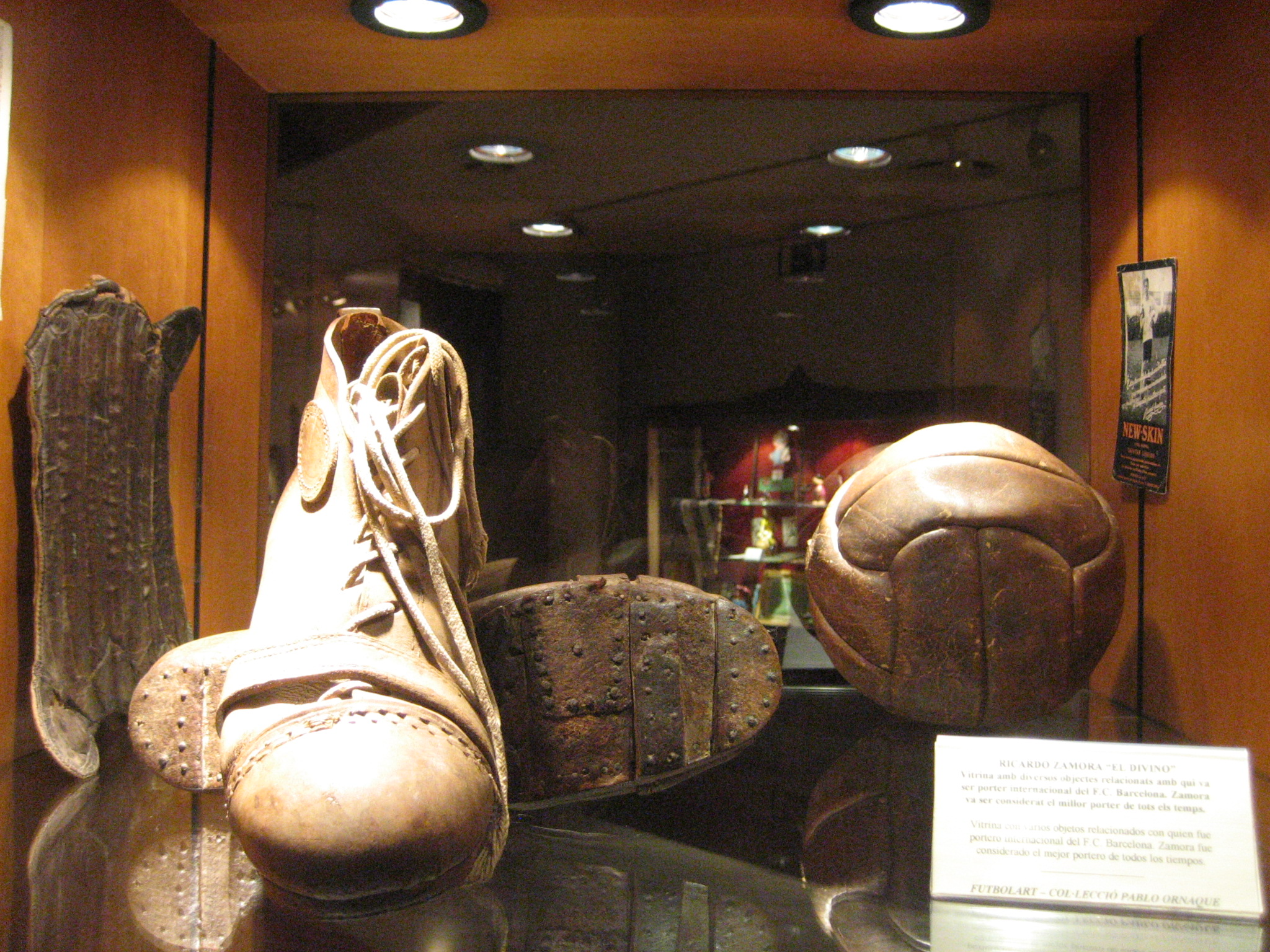
Footwear, shin pads and ball which belonged to Zamora in exhibition

=== Player ===
Espanyol

- Copa del Rey: 1928–29
- Catalan Champions: 1917–18, 1928–29

Barcelona

- Copa del Rey: 1920, 1922
- Catalan Champions: 1919–20, 1920–21, 1921–22

Real Madrid

- La Liga: 1931–32, 1932–33
- Copa de España: 1934, 1936

Spain

- Olympic Games: Silver medallist 1920

Catalan XI

- Prince of Asturias Cup: 1923–24, 1926

Individual

- IFFHS Best Spanish Goalkeeper of the Twentieth Century
- IFFHS Fourth Best European Goalkeeper of the Twentieth Century
- IFFHS Fifth Best World Goalkeeper of the Twentieth Century
- FIFA World Cup Team of the tournament: 1934
- FIFA World Cup Best Goalkeeper Award: 1934

=== Manager ===
Atlético Aviación

- Spanish Second Division: 1939 (Note: They defeated CA Osasuna, in a match for a spot in LA Liga held in Valencia on 26 November 1939, which Aviación won 3–1.)
- Campeonato Regional Centro: 1939
- La Liga: 1939–40, 1940–41
- Spanish Super Cup: 1940
- Copa Presidente Federación Castellana: 1940–41

Celta Vigo

- Copa del Generalísimo runner-up: 1947–48
