= 1939 Campeonato Mancomunado Centro =

Tournament details
- Country: Spain
- Dates: 1 October – 19 November
- Teams: 6

Final positions
- Champions: Athletic-Aviation Club (1st title)
- Runners-up: Real Madrid CF

Tournament statistics
- Matches played: 30
- Goals scored: 98 (3.27 per match)

The 1939 Campeonato Mancomunado Centro (Spanish: 1939 Central Joint Championship) was a football competition for clubs based primarily in the Castile region of Spain, including the Community of Madrid, played between 1 October and 19 November 1939. It was organized by the football federations that made up Spain's central zone, hence the name. This tournament was held in the form of a round-robin league and had a total of 30 matches.

It was the sixth joint championship of the Campeonato Regional Centro, after the Centro-Aragón in 1931–32, Centro-Sur in 1932–33 and 1933–34, and Castilla-Aragón in 1934–35 and 1935–36. The competition was then suspended for three seasons due to the Spanish Civil War. When the war had ceased in part of Andalusia, the teams from the Andalusian Federation abandoned the Centro tournament, which was suspended, to remake the Campeonato Regional Sur. This meant that the 1939 edition was contested by only six teams from the Madrid and Castilian-Leonese federations, including Real Madrid and Athletic-Aviation Club, the latter being the result of a merge between Atlético Madrid and Club Aviación Nacional, and who ended up winning the title after heading out Madrid on goal difference.

It was the last championship in league format played in the central regional area, due to the suppression of all national regional championships following the consolidation of the national league and its lower divisions.

== Tournament ==
The teams that competed in this edition were Real Madrid CF, Atlético Aviación de Madrid, AD Ferroviaria, UD Salamanca, Imperio CF, and Real Valladolid.

Atlético Aviación only won one of its first four matches, including a 1–2 loss to Madrid, but then won each of the remaining six Mancomunado matches, including a 3–0 victory over Madrid in the last matchday, which saw the two sides finish level on points, but Atlético Aviación winning the title with a better goal difference.

== Results ==
Date	Location	Visitor	Score
1 October 1939	Valladolid CD	Real Madrid FC	1–2
4 October 1939	Real Madrid FC	Imperio FC	2–0
6 October 1939	AD Ferroviaria	Athletic Aviación	2–1
7 October 1939	AD Ferroviaria	Valladolid CD	1–1
12 October 1939	AD Ferroviaria	Imperio FC	2–0
12 October 1939	Valladolid CD	Athletic Aviación	0–3
12 October 1939	UD Salamanca	Real Madrid FC	0–4
14 October 1939	AD Ferroviaria	Real Madrid FC	2–2
15 October 1939	UD Salamanca	Valladolid CD	1–0
15 October 1939	Athletic Aviación	Imperio FC	1–1
18 October 1939	Imperio FC	UD Salamanca	1–1
22 October 1939	Real Madrid FC	Athletic Aviación	2–1
22 October 1939	AD Ferroviaria	UD Salamanca	3–3
22 October 1939	Valladolid CD	Imperio FC	1–1
25 October 1939	Athletic Aviación	UD Salamanca	3–0

Date	Location	Visitor	Score
28 October 1939	Athletic Aviación	AD Ferroviaria	4–0
29 October 1939	Real Madrid FC	Valladolid CD	3–0
29 October 1939	UD Salamanca	Imperio FC	2–1
1 November 1939	Imperio FC	Real Madrid FC	1–2
1 November 1939	UD Salamanca	Athletic Aviación	1–3
1 November 1939	Valladolid CD	AD Ferroviaria	0–3
4 November 1939	Real Madrid FC	UD Salamanca	3–2
5 November 1939	Imperio FC	AD Ferroviaria	0–4
5 November 1939	Athletic Aviación	Valladolid CD	8–0
11 November 1939	Imperio FC	Athletic Aviación	2–3
12 November 1939	Real Madrid FC	AD Ferroviaria	1–2
12 November 1939	Valladolid CD	UD Salamanca	2–0
18 November 1939	Imperio FC	Valladolid CD	2–1
19 November 1939	Athletic Aviación	Real Madrid FC	3–0
19 November 1939	UD Salamanca	AD Ferroviaria	3–0

== League table ==
Pos	Team	Pld	W	D	L	GF	GA	GD	Pts	Qualification
1	Athletic Aviación	10	7	1	2	30	8	+22	15	Qualification for the Copa del Rey.
2	Real Madrid	10	7	1	2	21	12	+9	15	Qualification for the Copa del Rey.
3	Ferroviaria	10	5	3	2	19	15	+4	13	Qualification for the Copa del Rey.
4	Salamanca	10	3	2	5	13	20	−7	8	
5	Imperio	10	1	3	6	9	19	−10	5	
6	Valladolid	10	1	2	7	6	24	−18	4	

Source: BDFutbol

== Results table ==
	ATM	R M	FER	SAL	IMP	VAL
Atlhletic-Aviación		3–0	4–0	3–0	1–1	8–0
Real Madrid CF	2–1		1–2	3–2	2–0	3–0
AD Ferroviaria	2–1	2–2		3–3	2–0	1–1
UD Salamanca	1–3	0–4	3–0		2–1	1–0
Imperio CF	2–3	1–2	0–4	1–1		2–1
Real Valladolid	0–3	1–2	0–3	2–0	1–1	

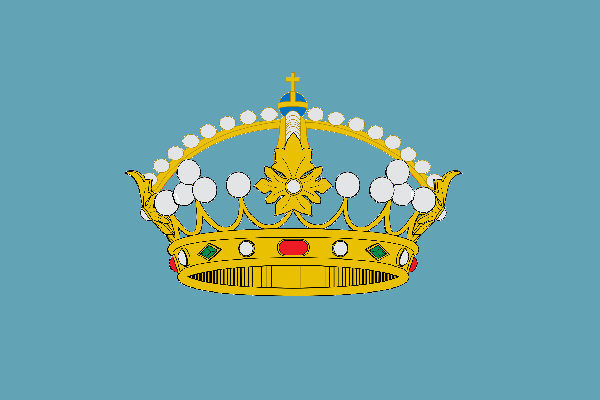
Champion
Athletic-Aviation Club
4th title

Qualified to the Copa del Rey-1940 Copa del Generalísimo

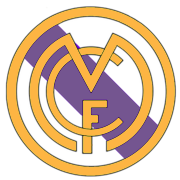
Athletic-Aviation Club	Real Madrid	AD Ferroviaria

== See also ==
- 1939–40 Atlético Aviación season
- 1940 Spanish Super Cup
- 1941–47 FEF President Cup
