= Copa de los Campeones de España =

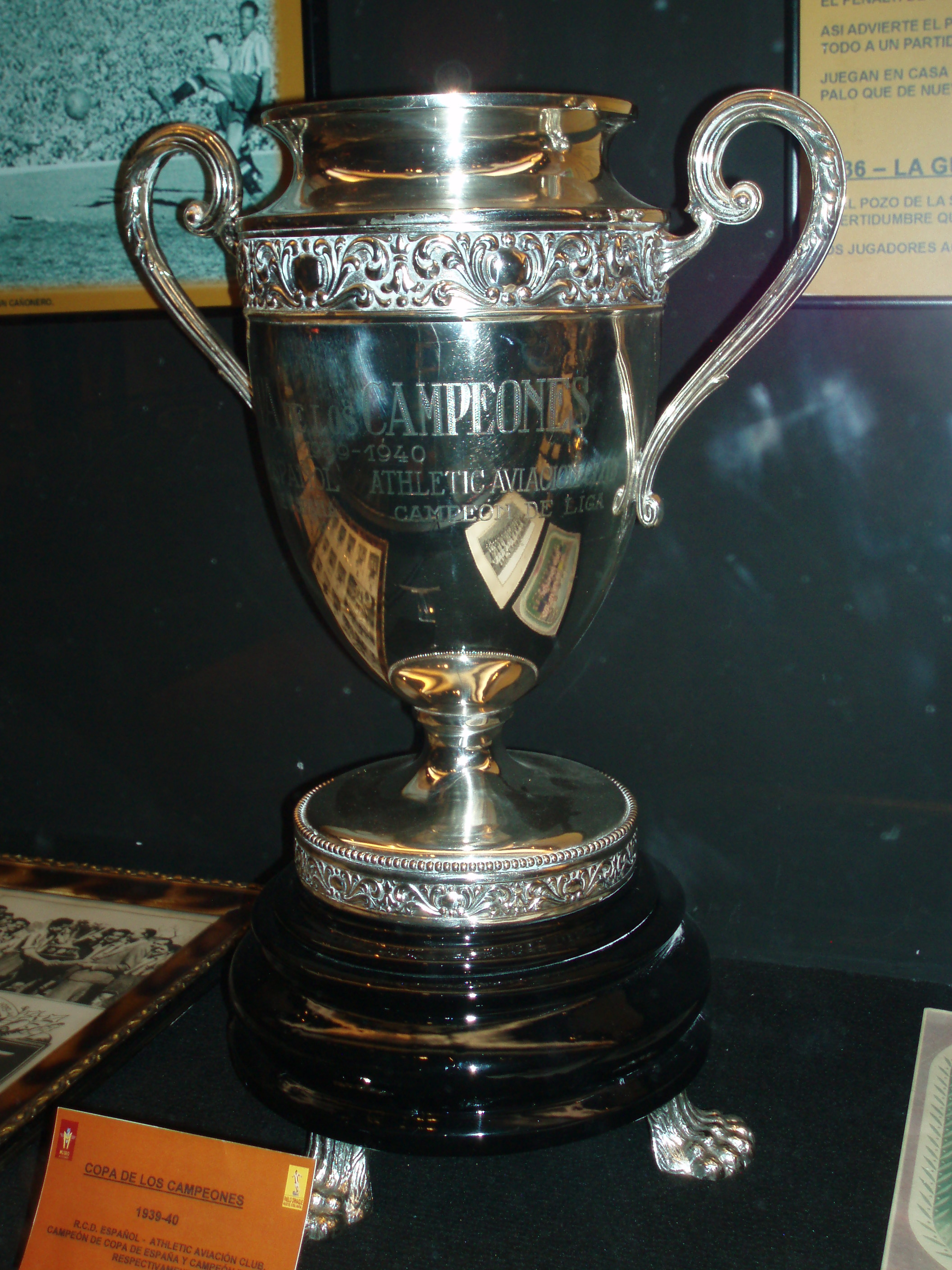
Atlético-Aviación	Español de Barcelona
La Liga	La Copa
10	4
- on aggregate

Second leg
Atlético-Aviación	Español de Barcelona
7	1
- Date: 15 September 1940
- Venue: Campo de Fútbol de Vallecas, Madrid

First leg
Español de Barcelona	Atlético-Aviación
3	3
- Date: 1 September 1940
- Venue: Sarrià Stadium, Barcelona

The Copa de los Campeones de España was a Spanish football competition, held once in September 1940 as a two-legged game between Club Atlético-Aviación (1939–40 La Liga winners) and RCD Español de Barcelona (1940 Copa del Generalísimo winners).

The first leg on 1 September was a 3–3 draw at the Sarrià Stadium in Barcelona, while the second two weeks later at the Campo de Fútbol de Vallecas was a 7–1 victory for Atlético, who were tenants at the ground following the destruction of their stadium in the Spanish Civil War.

It was the first super cup in Spanish football, however this competition is considered of a friendly nature and therefore unofficial; a view also shared by the Spanish football historian Ricardo Uribarri. The tournament was not repeated, but the format resumed in 1945 with the Copa de Oro Argentina, and two years later there was the first official version, the Copa Eva Duarte. This ended in 1953 and the current Supercopa de España began in 1982.

== Matches ==
1 September 1940
1st leg

Español de Barcelona	3–3	Atlético-Aviación
Martínez Català; Mas	Report	Muñoz; Campos

Sarrià Stadium
Referee: Lorenzo Torres

15 September 1940
2nd leg

Atlético-Aviación	7–1	Español de Barcelona
Pruden; Campos; Arencibia	Report	Martínez Català

Campo de Fútbol de Vallecas
Referee: Lorenzo Torres

== See also ==
- Supercopa de España
- Copa Eva Duarte
- Copa de Oro Argentina
