= Club Aviación Nacional =

Football club in Spain active between 1937 and 1939

- Full name: Club Aviación Nacional de Football
- Short name: Club Aviación
- Founded: 1937
- Dissolved: 1939
- Ground: Matacán Air Base Field (1937–38) Zaragoza (1938–39) Madrid (1939)
- Chairman: Francisco Vives Camino
- Manager: Ricardo Zamora
- League: Aragon championship
Home colours

Club Aviación Nacional was a football club, which was formed in 1937, during the Spanish Civil War, and dissolved in 1939, after an agreement with Atlético Madrid, which saw them become Athletic-Aviation Club, and then, in 1940, Club Atlético Aviación. Club Aviación is sometimes mistakenly linked to the origin of Atlético, but instead Aviación was its savior, as the agreement of the two clubs in 1939 saved Atlético from bankruptcy.

Aviación was founded by three aviation officers and was initially made up mostly of a group of soldiers with football skills. The team changed of headquarters numerous times in its 2-year-history, passing through places like Salamanca, Zaragoza and Madrid. Despite its short life as an independent club, Aviación Nacional was champion of the Aragon Regional Championship in 1939, which qualified them for the 1939 Copa del Generalísimo, where it was eliminated in the quarterfinals.

== History ==
In 1937, three aviation officers from the 35th Aviation Automobile Unit, Ensign Francisco Salamanca, Lieutenant González Conlicosa and Captain Trujillo, decided to create a football team. To achieve this goal, they began recruiting young football players among the soldiers who were members of the Air Force, and when they finally managed to gather enough players to assemble two teams they started organizing football matches, thus founding the National Aviation Club, in mid-1937 in Calamocha, Aragon, among which there were many Canarian players. The club's first home ground was the Matacán Air Base Field, which is currently the Salamanca Airport.

Later, in 1938, the 35th Unit had to move to Zaragoza due to the Spanish Civil War, and the newborn club settled in that city, winning the 1938–39 Aragon Championship, and thus qualifying for the Copa del Generalísimo in 1939, where they got knocked out in the quarterfinals by Sevilla FC 3–4 on aggregate, after having won the first leg 2–0. After the war, the club moved to Madrid, and their first match in the Spanish city was held on 2 May 1939 at the Vallecas field against Deportivo Alavés.

In 1939, the club had enough quality to face any national club, and thus, they had been promised a place in the Primera División for the 1939–40 season, only to be denied by the RFEF, and since they wanted to play in the First Division without having to go through the process of playing in the regional leagues, they tried to merge with the likes of Real Madrid and Athletic de Madrid.

== Merge with Atlético Madrid ==
At that time, Athletic de Madrid was not one of the greats in Spain, having only accumulated a handful of titles in their first decades of history – three Campeonato Regional Centro (1921, 1925 and 1928) and two Copa del Rey runners-up medals (1921 and 1926) – and although it was one of the ten teams that founded La Liga in 1928, Athletic came last in the standings in just the league's second edition in 1930 and fell to the Second Division. The club did not return to the top flight until 1935, just to descend again the following year, in 1936, shortly before the league was stopped due to the outbreak of the Civil War. By the end of the war, Athletic found itself in a difficult situation because they were lacking a suitable playing field as the Metropolitano had been completely destroyed by the war, lacking players because its squad had been decimated (including the club's star, Monchín Triana, who was shot down), and it accumulated an economic deficit that envisaged a dark future in its sporting and financial horizon. Moreover, Athletic was facing the possibility of being relegated to the Second Division due to having been penultimate in the 1935–36 La Liga, the last before the War. However, Athletic managed to find a lifeline in the form of a military group, Club Aviación Nacional, who will save them from an almost certain disappearance.

The directors of Athletic de Madrid, Cesáreo Galindez and Juan Tourón proposed to Captain Bosmediano and Lieutenant Salamanca, an agreement that could benefit everyone. Aviación Nacional had previously tried to merge with Real Madrid, but the conditions that the military club had proposed did not convince the Whites. Aviación required to impose its name, its shield, the colors of its uniform, and 50% of the directors and the president, and those demands did not convince Athletic either, since they did not want to lose their hallmarks. The negotiations were not easy, since Nacional de Madrid was also interested in merging with Aviación Nacional. Fearing this possibility, Athletic succumb to the conditions and a pre-agreement was reached in September 1939, and so, on 4 October, the representatives of both sides signed the absorption agreements and appoint the first Board of Directors with Commander Francisco Vives Camino as president of the now Athletic-Aviation Club. Even though this agreement is sometimes referred to as a "merge", it was not legally one (which explains why the 1939 Aragon Regional Championship, which the aviator club won in 1939, is not counted among the Atlético's titles), but rather just a change of name of the Madrid club under certain conditions. Either way, thanks to this agreement, the future Atlético went from ruined by the war to saved by Aviación.

== National dominance ==
At that time, Real Oviedo also had its field destroyed by the war, so it was decided to give up its place to another team, and that final spot was contested by Atlético and CA Osasuna, in a match in Valencia on 26 November, which Atlético Aviación won with a score of 3–1, thus achieving promotion to La Liga. Also in 1939, Ricardo Zamora was appointed coach of Athletic Aviación, later to become Atlético Aviación, and with Zamora as manager, Athletic Aviación won the 1939 Mancomunado, beating Real Madrid on goal difference. The club then reached new heights, surprising everyone by winning their first La Liga title in 1940 and then retaining the title in 1941. Thus, the club won two post-war championships under the name of Atlético Aviación.

In mid-1940, a decree issued by Francisco Franco banned teams from using foreign names, it prohibited anglicisms, and thus the club became Club Atlético Aviación de Madrid. In September 1940, Atlético Aviación won the very first Super cup in Spanish football after beating RCD Español, the 1940 Copa del Generalísimo winners, in a two-legged game that ended in a 10–4 aggregate victory, including a 7–1 trashing in the second leg at Campo de Fútbol de Vallecas.

In 1940–41, the Copa Presidente Federación Castellana was disputed by the champion and runner-up of the last Central Regional Championship, the 1939 Mancomunado, who were Athletic-Aviation Club and Real Madrid respectively. The contest was played over two legs, the first on 15 June at the Chamartín Stadium and the second on 22 June in Atlético's home, the Vallecas Stadium, where Atlético temporarily played until the reconstruction work of the Metropolitan Stadium was completed. Atlético-Aviación claimed the title with a 3–1 aggregate win over their neighbors, Real Madrid, who had been the absolute dominators of the regional tournaments of Castile in the 1930s.

On 14 December 1946, the club decided to drop the military association from its name, erasing the term “aviación” and it became Atlético again. Shortly after, on 6 January, it settled on its current name, Club Atlético de Madrid, as it is known today.

== Legacy ==
This plane, which carries the shield with the wings that Aviación wore on its shirt, is a tribute to that brilliant red and white stage (1939-1946).

— The plaque of the monument inaugurated on 24 October 2019 at the Wanda Metropolitano stadium as a tribute to Atlético Aviación.

Aviación is by no means the origin of the rojiblanco club, but it was the club that saved from an almost certain disappearance and took it to the top of football. Atlético has always shown its gratitude to it: In 2019, the Air Force loaned an aircraft to Atlético which was placed a few meters from the modern stadium in memory of its past.

== Honours ==
- Aragon Regional Championship
  - Winners: 1938–39
- Spanish Second Division
  - Winners: 1939 (Note: They defeated CA Osasuna, in a match for a spot in LA Liga held in Valencia on 26 November 1939, which Aviación won 3–1.)
- Campeonato Regional Centro
  - Winners (1): 1939
- La Liga:
  - Winners (2): 1939–40, 1940–41
- Spanish Super Cup
  - Winners (1): 1940
- Copa Presidente Federación Castellana
  - Winners (1): 1940–41

== See also ==
- Atlético Madrid
- Ricardo Zamora
