= 1940–41 La Liga =

10th season of La Liga

Primera División
- Season: 1940–41
- Champions: Atlético Aviación (2nd title)
- Relegated: Zaragoza; Murcia
- Matches: 132
- Goals: 569 (4.31 per match)
- Top goalscorer: Pruden (33 goals)
- Biggest home win: Sevilla 11–1 Barcelona
- Biggest away win: Atlético Bilbao 0–5 Atlético Aviación; Hércules 0–5 Celta
- Highest scoring: Sevilla 10–3 Valencia
- Longest winning run: 6 matches Atlético Bilbao
- Longest unbeaten run: 11 matches Atlético Aviación
- Longest winless run: 9 matches Zaragoza
- Longest losing run: 6 matches Celta; Murcia

The 1940–41 La Liga was the tenth season since its establishment. Atlético Aviación retained the title.

== Format changes ==
Due to the expansion of the league to 14 teams for the next season, the two last qualified teams, instead of being directly relegated to Segunda División, faced the third and fourth qualified teams in a single-game play-off match.

== Team locations ==
Location of teams in La Liga 1940–41

After an absence of one season due to the damages in their stadium, Oviedo came back to La Liga. Murcia made its debut this season.

With the arrival of the Francoism, in 1941 a law that forbid the use of foreign names like Athletic, Sporting or Racing was approved. However, the clubs recovered their Royal patronages and started to use again the term Real in their denominations.

Club	City	Stadium
Atlético Aviación	Madrid	Chamartín
Atlético Bilbao	Bilbao	San Mamés
Barcelona	Barcelona	Les Corts
Celta	Vigo	Balaídos
Español	Barcelona	Sarriá
Hércules	Alicante	Bardín
Murcia	Murcia	La Condomina
Oviedo	Oviedo	Buenavista
Madrid FC	Madrid	Chamartín
Sevilla	Seville	Nervión
Valencia	Valencia	Mestalla
Zaragoza	Zaragoza	Torrero

== League table ==
Pos	Team	Pld	W	D	L	GF	GA	GD	Pts	Qualification
1	Atlético Aviación (C)	22	13	7	2	70	36	+34	33	
2	Atlético Bilbao	22	13	5	4	49	24	+25	31	
3	Valencia	22	11	5	6	60	52	+8	27 (Note: Valencia finished ahead of Barcelona on head-to-head goal difference: Valencia–Barcelona 3–1, Barcelona–Valencia 4–3.)	
4	Barcelona	22	13	1	8	55	45	+10	27	
5	Sevilla	22	12	2	8	70	43	+27	26	
6	Madrid FC	22	11	2	9	51	38	+13	24	
7	Español	22	10	2	10	50	54	−4	22	
8	Oviedo	22	7	2	13	36	63	−27	16 (Note: Oviedo finished ahead of Hércules on head-to-head goal difference: Oviedo–Hércules 6–0, Hércules–Oviedo 3–0.)	
9	Hércules	22	7	2	13	28	67	−39	16	
10	Celta	22	7	1	14	45	51	−6	15	
11	Zaragoza (R)	22	5	4	13	26	41	−15	14	Qualification for the relegation play-offs
12	Murcia (R)	22	5	3	14	29	55	−26	13	Qualification for the relegation play-offs

Source: BDFútbol
Rules for classification: 1) points; 2) head-to-head points; 3) head-to-head goal difference; 4) goal difference; 5) number of goals scored.
(C) Champions; (R) Relegated

== Results ==
Home \ Away	AAV	ATB	BAR	CEL	ESP	HER	RMA	MUR	OVI	SEV	VAL	ZAR
Atlético Aviación	—	1–1	4–4	5–4	5–3	7–1	3–1	6–0	3–0	3–1	2–2	3–1
Atlético Bilbao	0–5	—	3–1	4–1	6–2	4–0	3–1	6–1	2–1	2–1	5–0	0–0
Barcelona	2–4	1–0	—	2–0	2–3	3–2	3–0	3–0	7–0	4–0	4–3	2–0
Celta	0–2	1–2	1–4	—	7–1	2–0	1–2	5–1	3–1	2–2	6–2	1–0
Español	2–3	1–1	3–1	4–1	—	1–2	3–2	2–1	5–0	4–3	2–1	3–0
Hércules	3–3	1–0	1–3	0–5	3–2	—	0–3	4–0	3–0	1–0	0–2	1–0
Madrid FC	1–4	0–1	1–2	3–1	4–1	5–3	—	2–1	1–0	4–1	6–1	6–0
Murcia	1–1	1–3	1–3	3–0	3–1	0–0	3–1	—	1–2	2–1	2–5	1–0
Oviedo	4–3	0–2	3–1	4–3	3–3	6–0	0–2	2–1	—	0–4	3–3	5–4
Sevilla	1–1	1–0	11–1	3–0	3–1	8–3	5–4	3–2	4–1	—	10–3	4–1
Valencia	3–1	2–2	3–1	5–1	3–0	6–0	1–1	3–3	5–1	4–1	—	1–0
Zaragoza	1–1	2–2	2–1	1–0	0–3	7–0	1–1	2–1	3–0	0–3	1–2	—

Source: BDFútbol
Legend: Blue = home team win; Yellow = draw; Red = away team win.

== Relegation play-offs ==
The match between Zaragoza and Castellón was played at Estadio Chamartín in Chamartín de la Rosa, while the one between Murcia and Deportivo La Coruña, in Campo de Fútbol de Vallecas, in Vallecas.

Team 1	Score	Team 2
Zaragoza	2–3	Castellón
Murcia	1–2	Deportivo La Coruña

== Top scorers ==
Rank	Player	Team	Goals
1	(Spain) Pruden	Atlético Aviación	33
2	(Spain) Mundo	Valencia	21
3	(Spain) Vicente Martínez Català	Español	18
4	(Spain) Campanal I	Sevilla	17
5	(Spain) Paco Campos	Atlético Aviación	16
6	(Spain) Manuel Alday	Madrid FC	14
6	(Spain) Torrontegui	Sevilla	14
6	(Spain) Guillermo Gorostiza	Valencia	14
9	(Spain) Mariano Martín	Barcelona	12
9	(Spain) Agustín	Celta	12
9	(Spain) Del Pino	Celta	12
