= 1939–40 La Liga =

9th season of La Liga

Primera División
- Season: 1939–40
- Champions: Atlético Aviación (1st title)
- Relegated: Betis; Racing Santander
- Matches: 132
- Goals: 501 (3.8 per match)
- Top goalscorer: Victorio Unamuno (20 goals)
- Biggest home win: Sevilla 8–2 Racing Santander
- Biggest away win: Betis 0–4 Madrid FC
- Highest scoring: Athletic Bilbao 7–5 Barcelona
- Longest winning run: 5 matches Atlético Aviación
- Longest unbeaten run: 7 matches Sevilla
- Longest winless run: 8 matches Zaragoza
- Longest losing run: 4 matches Athletic Bilbao; Celta; Español; Racing Santander

The 1939–40 La Liga was the ninth season since its establishment and the first one after the Spanish Civil War, which forced the suspension of the competition for three years. The season started on 3 December 1939, and finished on 28 April 1940.

Atlético Aviación won its first title ever.

== Format changes ==
For this season, the team qualified in the 10th position would face the second qualified team from Segunda División in a single-game play-off at a neutral venue. The winner would play the next season of La Liga.

== Team locations ==
Location of teams in 1939–40 La Liga

Due to the several damages in Estadio Buenavista after the Spanish Civil War, Oviedo did not play this season. However, the Spanish Football Federation assured them a berth in the 1940–41 La Liga.

Athletic Madrid changed its name to Athletic Aviación, after its merge with Aviación Nacional. Despite being relegated to Segunda División, it remained in the league by winning a play-off match against Osasuna for occupying the vacant berth after the resignation of Oviedo. Due to the damages at Estadio Metropolitano de Madrid, they played their games during this season at Estadio Chamartín, and one game at Vallecas.

Celta and Zaragoza made their debut in La Liga.

| Club | City | Stadium |
|---|---|---|
| Atlético Aviación | Madrid | Chamartín |
| Athletic Bilbao | Bilbao | San Mamés |
| Barcelona | Barcelona | Les Corts |
| Betis | Seville | Patronato Obrero |
| Celta | Vigo | Balaídos |
| Español | Barcelona | Sarriá |
| Hércules | Alicante | Bardín |
| Madrid FC | Madrid | Chamartín |
| Racing Santander | Santander | El Sardinero |
| Sevilla | Seville | Nervión |
| Valencia | Valencia | Mestalla |
| Zaragoza | Zaragoza | Torrero |

== League table ==
| Pos | Team | Pld | W | D | L | GF | GA | GD | Pts | Qualification or relegation |
|---|---|---|---|---|---|---|---|---|---|---|
| 1 | Atlético Aviación (C) | 22 | 14 | 1 | 7 | 43 | 29 | +14 | 29 | |
| 2 | Sevilla | 22 | 11 | 6 | 5 | 60 | 44 | +16 | 28 | |
| 3 | Athletic Bilbao | 22 | 11 | 4 | 7 | 57 | 44 | +13 | 26 | |
| 4 | Madrid FC | 22 | 12 | 1 | 9 | 47 | 35 | +12 | 25 | |
| 5 | Español | 22 | 11 | 2 | 9 | 43 | 43 | 0 | 24 | |
| 6 | Hércules | 22 | 9 | 5 | 8 | 41 | 34 | +7 | 23 | |
| 7 | Zaragoza | 22 | 7 | 7 | 8 | 30 | 40 | −10 | 21 (Note: Zaragoza finished ahead of Valencia on head-to-head points: Zaragoza–Valencia 1–0, Valencia–Zaragoza 0–0.) | |
| 8 | Valencia | 22 | 9 | 3 | 10 | 40 | 36 | +4 | 21 | |
| 9 | Barcelona | 22 | 8 | 3 | 11 | 32 | 38 | −6 | 19 (Note: Barcelona finished ahead of Celta on head-to-head points: Celta–Barcelona 1–2, Barcelona–Celta 2–0.) | |
| 10 | Celta (O) | 22 | 9 | 1 | 12 | 45 | 50 | −5 | 19 | Qualification for the relegation play-offs |
| 11 | Betis (R) | 22 | 6 | 4 | 12 | 26 | 51 | −25 | 16 | Relegation to the Segunda División |
| 12 | Racing Santander (R) | 22 | 6 | 1 | 15 | 37 | 57 | −20 | 13 | Relegation to the Segunda División |

Source: BDFútbol
Rules for classification: 1) points; 2) head-to-head points; 3) head-to-head goal difference; 4) goal difference; 5) number of goals scored.
(C) Champions; (O) Play-off winners; (R) Relegated

== Results ==
| Home \ Away | ATH | AAV | BAR | BET | CEL | ESP | HER | MAD | RAC | SEV | VAL | ZAR |
|---|---|---|---|---|---|---|---|---|---|---|---|---|
| Athletic Bilbao | — | 1–3 | 7–5 | 6–1 | 4–1 | 4–0 | 4–1 | 3–1 | 3–2 | 3–4 | 1–2 | 1–1 |
| Atlético Aviación | 3–1 | — | 3–0 | 0–0 | 4–1 | 2–0 | 2–1 | 2–1 | 2–1 | 4–2 | 2–0 | 5–1 |
| Barcelona | 0–2 | 1–2 | — | 2–0 | 2–0 | 0–1 | 0–0 | 0–0 | 3–1 | 1–2 | 4–1 | 2–1 |
| Betis | 0–0 | 1–2 | 3–0 | — | 2–0 | 2–0 | 4–3 | 0–4 | 2–1 | 3–2 | 0–3 | 0–0 |
| Celta | 2–4 | 1–0 | 1–2 | 4–2 | — | 2–0 | 4–0 | 2–3 | 5–1 | 3–3 | 2–1 | 5–1 |
| Español | 3–4 | 2–0 | 1–1 | 5–0 | 4–1 | — | 3–3 | 5–4 | 3–1 | 2–1 | 2–3 | 2–0 |
| Hércules | 1–0 | 4–1 | 1–2 | 3–0 | 6–1 | 1–2 | — | 0–2 | 3–1 | 3–3 | 2–1 | 5–1 |
| Madrid FC | 4–1 | 2–0 | 2–1 | 3–0 | 2–1 | 3–1 | 0–1 | — | 3–2 | 1–3 | 2–1 | 5–1 |
| Racing Santander | 3–0 | 0–2 | 2–3 | 4–2 | 6–2 | 2–3 | 0–1 | 2–1 | — | 3–3 | 2–1 | 1–0 |
| Sevilla | 3–3 | 4–1 | 2–1 | 4–3 | 1–4 | 4–0 | 1–1 | 3–2 | 8–2 | — | 4–2 | 3–0 |
| Valencia | 3–4 | 1–0 | 3–1 | 4–0 | 1–1 | 1–3 | 2–1 | 3–1 | 4–0 | 2–2 | — | 0–0 |
| Zaragoza | 1–1 | 4–3 | 3–1 | 1–1 | 3–2 | 4–1 | 0–0 | 3–1 | 3–0 | 1–1 | 1–0 | — |

Source: BDFútbol
Legend: Blue = home team win; Yellow = draw; Red = away team win.

== Relegation play-off ==
The play-off match was played at Estadio Chamartín in Chamartín de la Rosa.

| Team 1 | Score | Team 2 |
|---|---|---|
| Celta | 1–0 | Deportivo La Coruña |

== Top scorers ==
| Rank | Goalscorers | Team | Goals |
|---|---|---|---|
| 1 | (Spain) Victorio Unamuno | Athletic Bilbao | 20 |
| 2 | (Spain) Raimundo Blanco | Sevilla | 18 |
| 3 | (Spain) Vilanova | Hércules | 17 |
| 4 | (Spain) Campanal I | Sevilla | 16 |
| 5 | (Spain) Guillermo Gorostiza | Athletic Bilbao | 14 |
| 5 | (Spain) Agustín | Celta | 14 |
| 5 | (Spain) Antonio Chas | Racing Santander | 14 |
| 5 | (Spain) Mundo | Valencia | 14 |
| 9 | (Spain) Manuel Alday | Madrid FC | 13 |
| 10 | (Spain) Simón Lecue | Madrid FC | 12 |
