= Nico (footballer, born 1916) =

Spanish footballer (1916–2002)

Personal information
- Full name: Diego Forcén Cabito
- Date of birth: 3 February 1916
- Place of birth: Madrid, Spain
- Date of death: 7 January 2002 (aged 86)
- Place of death: Spain
- Position: Midfielder

Senior career*
Years	Team	Apps	(Gls)
1935–1936	Atlético Madrid		
1939–1944	Atlético Aviación	13	(0)
1939–1940	→ Imperio (on loan)		
1940–1942	→ Salamanca (on loan)		
1944–1945	Gimnástica de Torrelavega		
Total		13	(0)

Managerial career
- 1949–1950: Recreativo de Huelva
- * Club domestic league appearances and goals

Diego Forcén Cabito, better known as Nico (3 February 1916 – 7 January 2002), was a Spanish footballer who played as a midfielder for Atlético Madrid in the early 1940s.

== Playing career ==
Born on 3 February 1916 in Madrid, Nico began his career at his hometown club Atlético Madrid in 1935, aged 19, but because the coach preferred to rely on veterans, he ended up playing only a single official match with the first team that season, a Copa del Rey match against Sporting de Gijón on 26 April 1936, which ended in a 5–1 loss. His career was then interrupted by the outbreak of the Spanish Civil War, where he fought for the republican faction, being later forced to work in labor camps.

After the War ended in 1939, Nico returned to Atlético, which had now merged with Aviación Nacional to form Atlético Aviación, who loaned him out to its subsidiary, Imperio CF, where he played one season under coach José Quirante, featuring alongside Ramón Colón, Francisco Campos, and Cuestita, but they were not able to avoid relegation to the Tercera División.

Nico was then loaned to Salamanca for two consecutive seasons between 1940 and 1942, but during a small gap between those seasons, in June 1941, he started for Aviación in both legs of the final of the 1940–41 Copa Presidente Federación Castellana, which ended in a 3–1 victory on aggregate. Nico finally established himself in Atlético's first team in the 1942–43 season, in which he played 12 league matches, but he once again lost prominence and, the following season, only played one league match. He played his last football at Gimnástica de Torrelavega in the 1944–45 season.

== Managerial career ==
After retiring, Nico briefly coached Recreativo de Huelva in the 1949–50 season.

== Death ==
Nico died on 7 January 2002, at the age of 85.

== Honours ==
Atlético Aviación

- Copa Presidente Federación Castellana
  - Winners (1): 1940–41
