= List of Segunda División winning managers =

This is a list of Segunda División winning football managers.

== Seasons and winning managers ==
Season	Country	Winning manager	Club
1943–44	Spain	Amadeo Sánchez	Sporting Gijón
1944–45	Spain	Ramón Balaguer	Alcoyano
1945–46	Spain	Vicente Gracia	Sabadell
1946–47	Spain	Ramón Balaguer (2)	Alcoyano
1947–48	Spain	Antonio Barrios	Valladolid
1948–49	Spain	Benito Díaz	Real Sociedad
1949–50	Argentina	Lino Taioli	Racing Santander
1949–50	Spain	Josep Espada	Alcoyano
1950–51	Spain	Amadeo Sánchez (2)	Sporting Gijón
1950–51	Spain	Santiago Núñez	Atlético Tetuán
1951–52	Spain	Luis Urquiri	Oviedo
1951–52	Spain	Antonio Barrios (2)	CD Málaga
1952–53	Spain	Tomás Arnanz	Osasuna
1952–53	Spain	Adolfo Bracero	Jaén
1953–54	Spain	Manuel Echezarreta	Alavés
1953–54	Spain	Satur Grech	Las Palmas
1954–55	Spain	Román Galarraga	Cultural Leonesa
1954–55	Spain	Ramón Colón	Murcia
1955–56	Spain	Baltasar Albéniz	Osasuna
1955–56	Spain	Tomás Arnanz (2)	Jaén
1956–57	Spain	Jesús Barrio	Sporting Gijón
1956–57	Spain	Luis Pasarín	Granada
1957–58	Argentina	Abel Picabea	Oviedo
1957–58	Spain	Antonio Barrios (3)	Real Betis
1958–59	Spain	José Luis Saso	Valladolid
1958–59	Spain	César Rodríguez	Elche
1959–60	France	Louis Hon	Racing Santander
1959–60	Argentina	Juan Carlos Lorenzo	Mallorca
1960–61	Spain	Miguel Gual	Osasuna
1960–61	Paraguay	Heriberto Herrera	Tenerife
1961–62	Spain	Otxoa	Deportivo La Coruña
1961–62	Argentina	Roque Olsen	Córdoba
1962–63	Spain	Rafael Yunta	Pontevedra
1962–63	Spain	José Manuel Llopis	Murcia
1963–64	Argentina	Roque Olsen (2)	Deportivo La Coruña
1963–64	Spain	Vicente Dauder	Las Palmas
1964–65	France	Marcel Domingo	Pontevedra
1964–65	Spain	César Rodríguez (2)	Mallorca
1965–66	Spain	Enrique Orizaola	Deportivo La Coruña
1965–66	Spain	Luis Belló	Hércules
1966–67	Spain	Andoni Elizondo	Real Sociedad
1966–67	Spain	Ernesto Pons	CD Málaga
1967–68	Spain	Pedro Eguiluz	Deportivo La Coruña
1967–68	Spain	Joseíto	Granada
1968–69	Spain	Juan Arza	Sevilla
1969–70	Spain	Carriega	Sporting Gijón
1970–71	Spain	Antonio Barrios (4)	Real Betis
1971–72	Spain	Eduardo Toba	Oviedo
1972–73	Argentina	Felipe Mesones	Murcia
1973–74	Hungary	Ferenc Szusza	Real Betis
1974–75	Spain	Vicente Miera	Oviedo
1975–76	France	Lucien Muller	Burgos
1976–77	Spain	Vicente Miera (2)	Sporting Gijón
1977–78	Spain	Arsenio Iglesias	Zaragoza
1978–79	Spain	José María Maguregui	AD Almería
1979–80	Spain	José Víctor	Murcia
1980–81	Spain	Benito Joanet	Castellón
1981–82	Yugoslavia	Milorad Pavić	Celta Vigo
1982–83	Spain	Eusebio Ríos	Murcia
1983–84	Spain	Amancio Amaro	Castilla CF
1984–85	Argentina	Roque Olsen (3)	Las Palmas
1985–86	Spain	Vicente Campillo	Murcia
1986–87	Spain	Alfredo Di Stéfano	Valencia
1987–88	Hungary	László Kubala	CD Málaga
1988–89	Spain	Luiche	Castellón
1989–90	Spain	José Antonio Naya	Real Burgos
1990–91	Spain	Benito Floro	Albacete
1991–92	Spain	Txetxu Rojo	Celta Vigo
1992–93	Spain	Mané	Lleida
1993–94	Spain	José Antonio Camacho	Espanyol
1994–95	Croatia	Sergije Krešić	Mérida
1995–96	Spain	Manolo Jiménez	Hércules
1996–97	Argentina	Jorge D'Alessandro	Mérida
1997–98	Spain	Mané (2)	Alavés
1998–99	Spain	Joaquín Peiró	Málaga
1999–2000	Croatia	Sergije Krešić (2)	Las Palmas
2000–01	Spain	Joaquín Caparrós	Sevilla
2001–02	Spain	Luis Aragonés	Atlético Madrid
2002–03	Spain	David Vidal	Murcia
2003–04	Spain	Manolo Preciado	Levante
2004–05	Uruguay	Víctor Espárrago	Cádiz
2005–06	Spain	Marcelino	Recreativo
2006–07	Spain	José Luis Mendilibar	Valladolid
2007–08	Spain	Gonzalo Arconada	Numancia
2008–09	Spain	Esteban Vigo	Xerez
2009–10	Uruguay	Martín Lasarte	Real Sociedad
2010–11	Spain	Pepe Mel	Real Betis
2011–12	Spain	José Luis Oltra	Deportivo La Coruña
2012–13	Spain	Fran Escribá	Elche
2013–14	Spain	Gaizka Garitano	Eibar
2014–15	Spain	Pepe Mel (2)	Real Betis
2015–16	Spain	José Bordalás	Alavés
2016–17	Spain	Juan Muñiz	Levante
2017–18	Spain	Míchel	Rayo Vallecano
2018–19	Spain	Jagoba Arrasate	Osasuna
2019–20	Spain	Míchel (2)	Huesca
2020–21	Spain	Vicente Moreno	Espanyol
2021–22	Spain	Rubi	Almería
2022–23	Spain	Paco López	Granada
2023–24	Spain	Borja Jiménez	Leganés
2024–25	Spain	Julián Calero	Levante

== Multiple winners ==
Rank	Manager	Winners	Club(s)	Winning seasons
1	(Spain) Antonio Barrios	4	Valladolid, CD Málaga, Real Betis	1947–48, 1951–52, 1957–58, 1970–71
2	(Argentina) Roque Olsen	3	Córdoba, Deportivo La Coruña, Las Palmas	1961–62, 1963–64, 1984–85
3	(Spain) Ramón Balaguer	2	Alcoyano	1944–45, 1946–47
3	(Spain) Amadeo Sánchez	2	Sporting Gijón	1943–44, 1950–51
3	(Spain) Tomás Arnanz	2	Osasuna, Jaén	1952–53, 1955–56
3	(Spain) César Rodríguez	2	Elche, Mallorca	1958–59, 1964–65
3	(Spain) Vicente Miera	2	Oviedo, Sporting Gijón	1974–75, 1976–77
3	(Spain) Mané	2	Lleida, Alavés	1992–93, 1997–98
3	(Croatia) Sergije Krešić	2	Mérida, Las Palmas	1994–95, 1999–2000
3	(Spain) Pepe Mel	2	Real Betis	2010–11, 2014–15
3	(Spain) Míchel	2	Rayo Vallecano, Huesca	2017–18, 2019–20

== By nationality ==
Country	Managers	Total
Spain	39	82
Argentina	6	8
France	3	3
Croatia	1	2
Hungary	2	2
Uruguay	2	2
Paraguay	1	1
Serbia	1	1
