= Francisco Campos (footballer) =

Spanish footballer and referee

Personal information
- Full name: Francisco Campos Santín
- Date of birth: 8 August 1912
- Place of birth: Madrid, Spain
- Date of death: Unknown
- Position: Goalkeeper

Senior career*
Years	Team	Apps	(Gls)
1930–1932	Imperio CF		
1932–1936	Real Madrid		
1939–1940	Imperio CF		
1940–1941	Sporting de Gijón		
1941–1942	Sevilla		
- * Club domestic league appearances and goals

Francisco Campos Santín (8 August 1912 – Unknown) was a Spanish footballer who played as a goalkeeper for Real Madrid and Sevilla. He later became a referee, overseeing several matches in the first and second divisions between 1949 and 1957.

== Playing career ==
Born on 8 August 1912 in Madrid, Campos began his football career in 1931, at the age of 19, in his hometown club Imperio CF, which was a team made up of students and civil guards, but it also served as a subsidiary and youth team of Real Madrid. In his first season at the club, he stood out among his teammates, which included Avelino Álvarez, so he was signed by Real Madrid in 1932, where he had few chances, mostly due to the presence of the great Ricardo Zamora. He appears as a reserve for the squad between 1932 and 1936, and only played 2 official matches in the first team as a goalkeeper, one of which in the 1934–35 La Liga, an away fixture against Valencia on 27 January, conceding only once in a 4–1 win. Despite having little to no playing time, Campos stayed at Madrid for four years until the outbreak of the Spanish Civil War in 1936.

After the Civil War ended in 1939, Campos returned to Imperio, where he played one season under coach José Quirante, featuring alongside Ramón Colón and Cuestita, but they were not able to avoid relegation to the Tercera División. Campos then played one season in both Sporting de Gijón and Sevilla before retiring in the latter in 1942, at the age of 30.

== Refereeing career ==
In 1949, seven years after retiring, Campos became an official football referee. Between 1949 and 1957, he oversaw several matches in the first and second divisions, occasionally in the Spanish Cup, and even one promotion match to the first division in 1953. Notably, he refereed two matches between Valencia and Real Sociedad in 1952 and 1954; Valencia netted four goals in both of them. In the only match with Deportivo de La Coruña that he refereed, the club suffered a resounding 2–8 defeat to Athletic Bilbao.

The date of his death is unknown.

== See also ==
- List of Real Madrid CF players
