= Rafael Suárez (footballer) =

Spanish footballer (1913–1999)

Rafael Suárez del Villar
Personal information
- Full name: Rafael Suárez del Villar y Viñas
- Date of birth: 12 January 1913
- Place of birth: Lleida, Spain
- Date of death: 15 June 1999 (aged 86)
- Place of death: Spain
- Position: Defender

Senior career*
| Years | Team | Apps | (Gls) |
| 1932 | Atlético Madrid | 2 | (0) |
| 1932–1933 | Imperio | | |
| 1933–1936 | Nacional de Madrid | | |
| 1939–1940 | Imperio | | |
| 1940–1941 | Real Madrid | 2 | (0) |
| 1941–1942 | Real Valladolid | | |
| Total | | 4 | (0) |
- * Club domestic league appearances and goals

Rafael Suárez del Villar y Viñas (12 January 1913 – 15 June 1999) was a Spanish footballer who played as a defender for Atlético Madrid in the early 1930s and Real Madrid in the early 1940s.

== Early and personal life ==
Born on 12 January 1913 in the Catalonian city of Lleida, Rafael Suárez del Villar married Rosario Ruiz de Huidobro y Lobo (1918–?), with whom he had six children.

== Career ==
Despite being born in Catalonia, Suárez spent almost all of his career playing for Madrid clubs, starting with Atlético Madrid in 1932, aged 19, with whom he played two matches in the Segunda División, both in February 1932. He left the club before the season was over to join fellow Madrid-based club Imperio, with whom he started in the final of the 1932 Spanish Amateur Championship on 19 June at the Chamartín, where he scored the opening goal to help his side to a 3–0 victory over Erandio Club.

In 1933, Suárez signed for another second division team, Nacional de Madrid, where he played for three years, until 1936, when the Spanish Civil War broke out. Once the conflict was over, he returned to Imperio, which now served as a subsidiary of Atlético Madrid, then known as Atlético Aviación, and with whom he played one season under coach José Quirante, featuring alongside Cuestita, Nico, and Ramón Colón. but while the latter two then joined Aviación, Suárez signed for Real Madrid in 1940, with whom he played only two matches in La Liga, Suárez made his top flight debut in an El Clásico against Barcelona, which ended in a 1–2 loss.

In 1941, Suárez went to Real Valladolid, then in the second division, where he retired in 1942, aged 29.

== Death ==
Suárez died on 15 June 1999, at the age of 86.
