= Juan Calvo =

Juan Calvo may refer to:

- Juan Calvo (actor) (1892–1962), Spanish actor
- Juan Carlos Calvo (1906–1977), Uruguayan footballer
- Juan Antonio Calvo (1948–2020), Spanish sports journalist
- Juan Jesús Aquino Calvo (born 1975), Mexican politician
