= Manolo Villanova =

Spanish football player and manager (1942–2025)

Personal information
- Full name: Manuel José Villanova Rebollar
- Date of birth: 27 August 1942
- Place of birth: Zaragoza, Spain
- Date of death: 6 December 2025 (aged 83)
- Place of death: Zaragoza, Spain
- Height: 1.77 m (5 ft 10 in)
- Position: Goalkeeper

Senior career*
Years	Team	Apps	(Gls)
1966–1967	Mallorca	14	(0)
1967–1971	Betis	81	(0)
1971–1975	Zaragoza	51	(0)
Total		156	(0)

Managerial career
- 1975–1978: Deportivo Aragón
- 1979–1981: Zaragoza
- 1982–1984: Salamanca
- 1984–1985: Mallorca
- 1985–1986: Hércules
- 1987–1988: Zaragoza
- 1991–1992: Huesca
- 1992–1996: Recreativo
- 1996–2003: Zaragoza B
- 2006–2008: Huesca
- 2008: Zaragoza
- 2008–2009: Zaragoza B
- 2013–2014: Sariñena
- * Club domestic league appearances and goals

Manuel José "Manolo" Villanova Rebollar (27 August 1942 – 6 December 2025) was a Spanish football manager and player who played as a goalkeeper.

== Playing career ==
Born in Zaragoza, Aragon, Villanova's first professional club was Segunda División's RCD Mallorca, whom he joined in 1966. After a full season at the club, he moved to La Liga with Real Betis, suffering relegation during his first campaign.

Villanova continued to appear with the Andalusians in the following years, all in the second level. In 1972, he returned to the top tier, after agreeing to a deal with Real Zaragoza.

A backup to Manolo Nieves, Villanova appeared sparingly for his hometown club, and retired in 1975 at the age of 32.

== Managerial career ==
Immediately after retiring Villanova took up coaching, being appointed at Zaragoza's reserve team, Deportivo Aragón. In May 1979, he was appointed at the helm of the main squad, replacing Vujadin Boškov.

Villanova was sacked in March 1981, after winning only one match out of ten. In June he was named UD Salamanca manager, and took the club back to the top level at first attempt.

Villanova was in charge of the Charros until 1984, and left the club after suffering relegation as dead last. In 1984, he was appointed manager of RCD Mallorca in the second division, finishing the campaign in the seventh position.

In October 1985, Villanova returned to the main category, being appointed Hércules CF manager and replacing sacked Antoni Torres. He was unable to prevent relegation nonetheless, and subsequently left the club.

In December 1987, Villanova returned to Zaragoza, taking the club to an impressive fifth position before resigning. He only returned to coaching duties in 1991, while in charge of SD Huesca.

In 1996, after four full seasons at Recreativo de Huelva, Villanova rejoined Zaragoza and its reserve team. In charge until 2003, he only left his post to join the club's board.

In July 2006, Villanova returned to Huesca. On 3 March 2008, he returned to Zaragoza for a third spell, with his side seriously threatened with relegation.

After failing to avoid the drop with the main squad, Villanova was appointed manager of the reserves for a third time. He was relieved from his duties in June 2009, ending a 12-year relationship with the club.

On 14 October 2013, Villanova was named manager of CD Sariñena, in Segunda División B. After suffering relegation, he left the club.

== Death ==
Villanova died on 6 December 2025, at the age of 83.
