= Jaime Tobajas =

Spanish footballer

Personal information
- Full name: Jaime Tobajas Cabeza
- Date of birth: 15 December 2006 (age 19)
- Place of birth: Zaragoza, Spain
- Height: 1.78 m (5 ft 10 in)
- Position: Attacking midfielder

Team information
- Current team: Zaragoza B
- Number: 23

Youth career
- 2011–2019: Santo Domingo Juventud
- 2019–2022: Ebro
- 2022–2025: Zaragoza

Senior career*
Years	Team	Apps	(Gls)
2025–	Zaragoza B	31	(3)
2026–	Zaragoza	1	(0)
- * Club domestic league appearances and goals as of 17 May 2026

Jaime Tobajas Cabeza (born 15 December 2006) is a Spanish footballer who plays as an attacking midfielder for Deportivo Aragón.

== Career ==
Born in Zaragoza, Aragon, Tobajas joined Real Zaragoza's youth sides in 2022, after representing CD Ebro and CF Santo Domingo Juventud. He made his senior debut with the reserves on 7 September 2025, starting in a 2–0 Segunda Federación home win over Gernika Club.

Tobajas scored his first senior goals on 18 October 2025, netting a brace for the B's in a 2–2 away draw against CD Tudelano. He established himself as a regular starter for the side, and made his first team debut on 17 May 2026, coming on as a late substitute for fellow youth graduate Hugo Pinilla in a 3–1 Segunda División home loss to Sporting de Gijón.
