= Hugo Barrachina =

Spanish footballer

Personal information
- Full name: Hugo Barrachina Diloy
- Date of birth: 30 August 2006 (age 20)
- Place of birth: Zaragoza, Spain
- Height: 1.85 m (6 ft 1 in)
- Position: Centre-back

Team information
- Current team: Zaragoza B
- Number: 5

Youth career
- Unión
- Zaragoza

Senior career*
Years	Team	Apps	(Gls)
2023–	Zaragoza B	59	(0)
2025–	Zaragoza	2	(0)

International career
2024	Spain U18	3	(0)
- * Club domestic league appearances and goals as of 14 May 2026

Hugo Barrachina Diloy (born 30 August 2006) is a Spanish footballer who plays as a centre-back for Deportivo Aragón.

== Club career ==
Born in Zaragoza, Aragon, Barrachina joined Real Zaragoza's youth sides from CD Unión La Jota Vadorrey. He made his senior debut with the reserves on 19 November 2023, coming on as a late substitute for goalscorer Marcos Cuenca in a 2–0 Segunda Federación home win over Utebo FC.

After making two consecutive pre-seasons with the first team, Barrachina made his debut with the main squad on 29 October 2025, replacing Carlos Pomares in a 3–1 away win over UD Mutilvera, for the season's Copa del Rey. He made his professional debut the following 31 January, replacing Martín Aguirregabiria in a 2–0 Segunda División loss at Albacete Balompié.

== International career ==
On 10 January 2024, Barrachina was called up to the Spain national under-18 team for a friendly against Italy.
