= Raúl Ojeda (footballer, born 2005) =

Spanish footballer

Personal information
- Full name: Raúl Ojeda Antón
- Date of birth: 23 December 2005 (age 20)
- Place of birth: Huesca, Spain
- Position: Winger

Team information
- Current team: Huesca B
- Number: 11

Youth career
- Huesca

Senior career*
Years	Team	Apps	(Gls)
2023–	Huesca B	29	(5)
2025–	Huesca	1	(0)
- * Club domestic league appearances and goals as of 23 March 2025

Raúl Ojeda Antón (born 23 December 2005) is a Spanish footballer who plays mainly as a left winger for SD Huesca B.

== Career ==
Born in Huesca, Aragon, Ojeda was a youth product of hometown side SD Huesca. He made his senior debut with the reserves on 26 November 2023, coming on as a late substitute in a 1–1 Tercera Federación away draw against CD Cuarte.

Definitely promoted to the B-team ahead of the 2024–25 campaign, Ojeda scored his first senior goal on 15 September 2024, netting the equalizer in a 2–1 home win over CD Brea. He made his first team debut the following 23 March, replacing Ignasi Vilarrasa in a 2–1 Segunda División away loss to SD Eibar.

== Personal life ==
Ojeda's father, also named Raúl, was also a footballer. A goalkeeper, he represented UE Lleida and Elche CF in the second division (also playing for the former in La Liga), and later worked at Huesca after retiring.
