= Luis Costa (Spanish footballer) =

Spanish footballer and manager

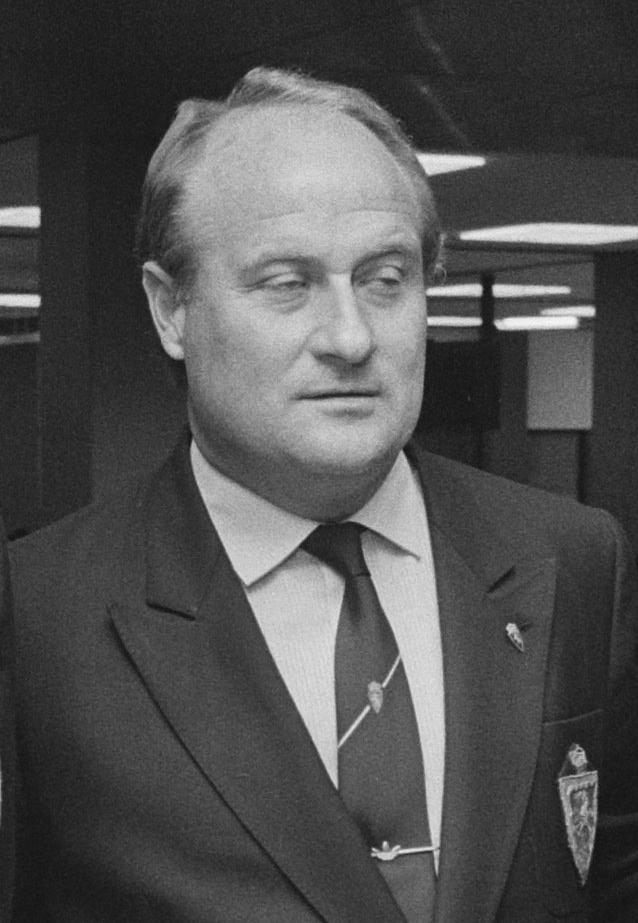
- Costa as Zaragoza manager in 1987

Personal information
- Full name: Luis Costa Juan
- Date of birth: 19 February 1943 (age 83)
- Place of birth: Alicante, Spain
- Height: 1.66 m (5 ft 5 in)
- Position: Forward

Youth career
- Jove Español
- Villafranqueza
- 1958–1960: Hércules
- 1960–1962: Real Madrid

Senior career*
Years	Team	Apps	(Gls)
1962–1966	Real Madrid	0	(0)
1962–1964	→ Elche (loan)	29	(4)
1964–1965	→ Córdoba (loan)	20	(0)
1965–1966	→ Hércules (loan)	5	(0)
1966–1969	Córdoba	81	(7)
1969–1970	Mallorca	23	(1)
1970–1973	Zaragoza	59	(13)
1973–1976	Girona		
Total		217	(25)

International career
1960	Spain U18	3	(0)

Managerial career
- 1976–1977: Mallorca
- 1977–1978: Huesca
- 1978–1981: Deportivo Aragón
- 1981: Zaragoza
- 1981–1982: Girona
- 1982: Huesca
- 1982–1983: Palencia
- 1983–1984: Oviedo
- 1984–1985: Deportivo Aragón
- 1985–1987: Zaragoza
- 1988–1989: Málaga
- 1989: Elche
- 1992: Levante
- 1992–1993: Alavés
- 1993: Córdoba
- 1994–1997: Zaragoza B
- 1997–1998: Zaragoza
- 2000–2001: Zaragoza
- 2002: Zaragoza
- * Club domestic league appearances and goals

Luis Costa Juan (born 19 February 1943) is a Spanish former football forward and manager.

Most of his professional career was closely associated with Zaragoza, as both a player and a manager.

== Playing career ==
Costa was born in Alicante, Valencian Community. After rising to prominence in amateur tournaments held in his hometown, he signed with Real Madrid from Hércules CF at the age of 17, spending four years under contract as a senior but never appearing in competitive matches for the club – whose forward line included the likes of Francisco Gento, Raymond Kopa, Ferenc Puskás, Luis del Sol and Alfredo Di Stéfano – also being loaned four times to three teams, including fellow La Liga sides Córdoba CF and Elche CF.

In 1966, Costa left Real and signed for Córdoba on a permanent basis, following an unassuming spell with Hércules in the Segunda División. From 1968 to 1971 he suffered three consecutive relegations from the main division, with the Andalusians, RCD Mallorca and Real Zaragoza; he amassed top-flight totals of 188 games and 19 goals, and closed out his career aged 33 after three years in the Tercera División with Girona FC, having obtained his coaching license before he retired.

== Coaching career ==
Costa's first job in the top division came with Zaragoza, overseeing one game in the 1980–81 season, a 1–1 home draw against Hércules. After two complete seasons in the second tier, with Palencia CF and Real Oviedo, he returned to the Aragonese for 1985–86, winning his first Copa del Rey – 1–0 win over FC Barcelona– and being fired early into the 1987–88 campaign.

In the early 90s, Costa worked in the lower leagues with Levante UD, Deportivo Alavés and his former club Córdoba. In 1994, he was appointed at Zaragoza's reserves in the Segunda División B, whom he had already coached the previous decade.

Costa was one of four managers in Zaragoza's first team in the 1996–97 season, with the team finally ranking in 14th position. He was in charge for the entirety of the following campaign, which finished with the side one position above.

Having replaced Juan Manuel Lillo after the fourth round in 2000–01, Costa led Zaragoza to another Spanish Cup triumph, now against RC Celta de Vigo. The team could only finish 17th in the league however, being the first above the relegation zone (one of the few bright spots of the campaign was a 4–4 draw at Barcelona).

On 22 January 2002, Costa replaced Txetxu Rojo at the helm of Zaragoza, not being able to prevent top-division relegation (as last) having won only twice in his ten games in charge.

== Honours ==
=== Manager ===
Zaragoza

- Copa del Rey: 1985–86, 2000–01
