= Rafael Suárez =

Rafael Suárez or Suarez may refer to:

- Rafael Suárez (footballer) (1913–1999), Spanish footballer
- Rafael Suárez (composer) (1929–1971), Venezuelan conductor and arranger
- Ray Suarez (Rafael Suarez Jr., born 1957), American journalist
- Rafael Suárez (fencer) (born 1972), Venezuelan-American fencer
- Rafael Vargas-Suarez (born 1972), American artist
