= Tomás Arnanz =

Spanish footballer and manager (1910–1957)

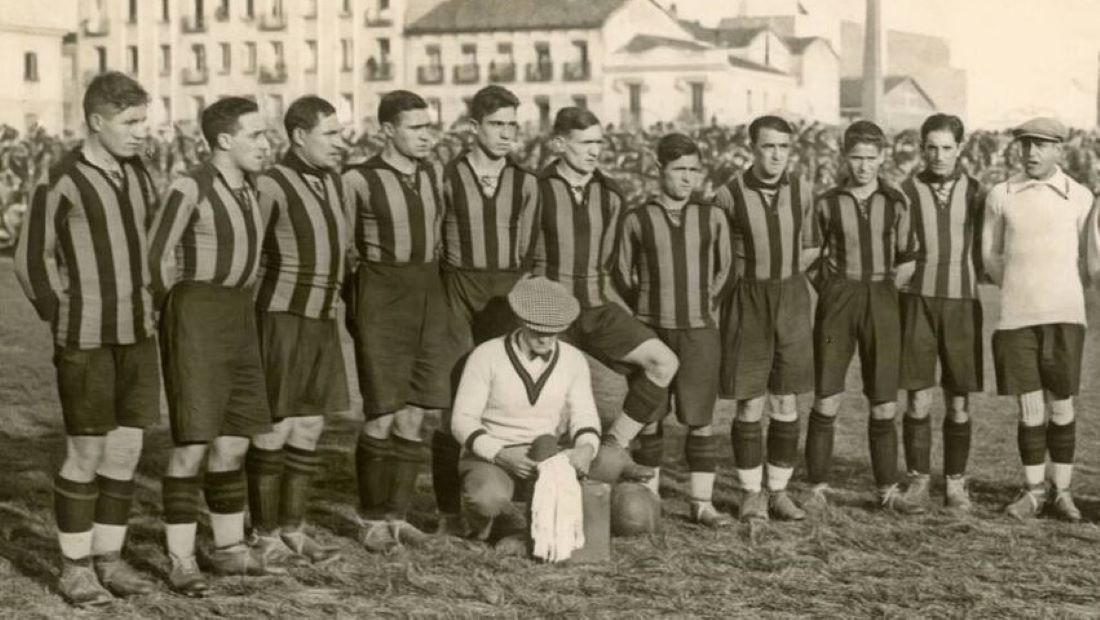
- Tomás (first from left) in 1929

Personal information
- Birth name: Tomás Arnanz Arribas
- Date of birth: 29 December 1910
- Place of birth: Villanueva de las Carretas, Castile and León, Spain
- Date of death: 8 August 1957 (aged 46)
- Place of death: Unknown
- Position: Forward

Youth career
- 1925–1926: Iberia SC

Senior career*
Years	Team	Apps	(Gls)
1926–1927	Aragón SC		
1927–1932	Iberia SC		
1932–1936	Real Zaragoza		
1940–1941	Real Zaragoza	2	(0)

Managerial career
- 1934: Real Zaragoza
- 1939–1941: Real Zaragoza
- 1945: Real Zaragoza
- Real Santander
- 1952–1955: Osasuna
- 1955–1956: Real Jaén
- 1956–1957: Eldense
- * Club domestic league appearances and goals

Tomás Arnanz Arribas (29 December 1910 – 8 August 1957), also known as Tomasín, was a Spanish footballer who played as a forward for Real Zaragoza in the 1930s, and later a manager who oversaw the likes of Osasuna and Real Jaén in the 1950s, winning the Segunda División title with both sides.

== Early life ==
Tomás Arnanz was born on 29 December 1910 in the Province of Burgos town of Villanueva de las Carretas in Castile and León, (Note: Some sources wrongly state that he was born in Zaragoza.) but he always considered himself Aragonese since his parents were both from Valladolid and also because he moved to Zaragoza in 1920, aged 10. Three years later, on 7 October 1923, the 12-year-old Tomás and his classmates from the Padres Escolapios school were invited to attend the official opening of the Estadio Torrero, becoming a servant supporter of Iberia SC since that day.

== Playing career ==
=== Iberia SC ===
He began his football career in the youth ranks of Iberia in 1925, playing under the name Tomasín, and in the following year, he joined a modest Zaragoza side called Aragón SC, the secret reserve team of Iberia that served as a breeding ground for promising youngsters. There, he quickly stood out from the rest of his peers, not only for his goalscoring abilities as a center forward, but also due to his strength and aggressiveness, so he soon caught the attention of Iberia's coach Karoly Plattkó, who was so impressed by his qualities that he took him to Iberia's first team in 1927, when he was only 16, so that he could gain experience in friendly matches and training sessions. However, he did not play a single official match that season because José María Zorrozúa was the team's undisputed center forward, so Tomasín had to play his way into the forward line as a midfielder. In that 1928–29 season, he scored a total of 13 goals in 28 official matches, including in the inaugural edition of the Segunda División, where they narrowly missed promotion, the Aragón Regional Championship, which they won, and the Copa del Rey, where they were knocked out in the round of 32.

Tomasín quickly established himself as a pivotal player, which earned him his first professional contract in 1929, aged 18, consisting of a monthly salary of 350 pesetas. He remained a regular at Iberia until 18 March 1932, when it merged with Zaragoza CD to form Real Zaragoza, where he became known simply as Tomás. In total, he scored 33 goals in 95 official matches for Iberia, with whom he won four consecutive Aragonese championships between 1928 and 1931, but he also was relegated to the Tercera División in 1931.

=== Real Zaragoza ===
On 13 March 1932, Tomás started in Iberia's last-ever match, which ended in a 3–0 loss to Real Valladolid, and in the following week, on 20 March, he started in Zaragoza's first-ever match, helping his side to a 4–0 win over Valladolid. In the club's second-ever match, a friendly against Barcelona on 14 April, he scored a brace to help his side to a 3–1 win. He was Zaragoza's first-ever captain, and in September 1932, he and his friend Pascual Salas were referred to as "the most prominent representatives of local football" by the local press.

On 13 May 1934, following a 4–0 loss to Barakaldo in the promotion play-offs for the Second Division, José María Gayarre, the club president, dismissed the coach Filipe dos Santos and replaced him with Tomás, who thus served the rest of the season as a player-coach, being assisted by teammate Elías Sauca, who had also served as a player-coach previously. In the following day, on 14 May, he made his managerial debut against Gimnástico, which ended in another 4–0 loss. In total, he oversaw only six matches, winning two, drawing one, and winning two, both of which in style, trashing Logroño 4–0 and the undefeated leaders Valladolid 5–0. Despite losing the play-offs, Zaragoza ended up achieving promotion anyways thanks to the expansion of the second division to 24 teams, but neither the promotion nor his status as captain stopped Tomás from repeatedly requested to be released from the club during that summer, so that he could follow in the footsteps of his friend Salas, who was succeeding at Barcelona, going even to the Catalan capital where he trained at Les Corts for several days, but even after his signing was announced, Zaragoza did not grant him a release, so he had no choice but to return home, losing the captaincy to Sebastián Municha.

Together with Municha, Primitivo Villacampa, and Manuel Olivares, Tomás played a crucial role in the Zaragoza team that finished runner-up in the 1935–36 Segunda División (he scored 17 goals in 21 league matches that season), thus finally achieving promotion to La Liga, but they were unable to make their debut there because of the outbreak of the Spanish Civil War, during which he suffered a foot injury that forced him to hang up his boots.

== Managerial career ==
=== Real Zaragoza ===
After his career as a player ended, Arnanz remained linked to Real Zaragoza, now as a coach, which he oversaw between 1939 and 1941, both in the top flight, thus becoming the club's first-ever La Liga coach. On 31 December 1939, Zaragoza played its first-ever New Year's Eve match, which ended in a 1–1 draw with Athletic Bilbao at the San Mamés. Due to a shortage in the squad caused by the War, Arnanz had to step onto the field occasionally, playing a total of two La Liga matches during the 1940–41 season. Zaragoza ended this season second-to-last, thus having to play a promotion playoff against the second-placed team of Division Two, Castellón, on 2 May 1941, which ended in a 3–2 loss, with Arnanz being subsequently sacked.

Four years later, in 1945, he returned to the benches of Zaragoza for the third time, signing for 5,000 pesetas, which was ten times less than what previous managers had been paid due to the club's newly founded debt; however, a defeat in Torrero to Deportivo de La Coruña triggered a massive crisis that resulted in Tomás irrevocably resigning. In total, Arnanz led Zaragoza in 84 matches between 1934 and 1946, winning 30, drawing 16, and losing 38, for a winning ratio of 35,71%. On 8 June 1952, he was the subject of a tribute match.

=== Later career ===
Arnanz later coached Real Santander and CA Osasuna, which he led to a triumph in the 1952–53 Segunda División, thus achieving promotion to La Liga, although they were relegated back in the following season. In 1955, he took over Real Jaén, and in his first season at the club, he led to a triumph in the 1955–56 Segunda División, thus becoming one of the few managers to have won the second division title twice with two different clubs. However, their top-flight experience proved unsuccessful, and he resigned after just eight matches, having managed Real Jaén for 42 official matches, winning 19, drawing 9, and losing 14; he remains the last coach to lead Jaén to the top-flight.

Arnanz then took over Eldense, where he stayed for a single season, coaching a total of 23 matches in the second division, which remains the fourth-highest tally in the club's history.

== Death ==
Arnanz died on 8 August 1957, at the age of 46.

== Honours ==
=== As a player ===
Real Zaragoza

- Segunda División:
  - Runner-up (2): 1929 and 1935–36

=== As a manager ===
Osasuna

- Segunda División:
  - Champions (1): 1952–53

Real Jaén

- Segunda División:
  - Champions (1): 1955–56

== See also ==
- List of Segunda División winning managers
