= EHA Tánger =

Spanish football club

- Full name: Escuela Hispano Árabe de Tánger
- Founded: 1939
- Dissolved: 1941
- Ground: El Marchán; Tangier, Morocco
- Capacity: 15,000
Home colours	Away colours

Escuela Hispano Árabe de Tánger was a Spanish football club based in Tangier, in Morocco.

== History ==
Founded in 1939 as a merger between the Spanish and the Moroccan teams of Hogar Español de Tánger, the club played its first season in the Segunda División thanks to the help of the city during the Spanish Civil War. Finishing last of the group 5, the club was relegated to Tercera División but never played in the category, opting to play in the regional leagues until its dissolution in 1941.

== Season to season ==
Season	Tier	Division	Place	Copa del Rey
1939–40	2	2ª	8th	
1940–41	4	1ª Reg.	1st	

- 1 season in Segunda División
