= RD Oriamendi =

Spanish football club

- Full name: Real Deportivo Oriamendi
- Founded: 1939
- Dissolved: 1944
- Ground: El Molinón, Gijón, Asturias, Spain
- Capacity: 30,000
Home colours

Real Deportivo Oriamendi was a Spanish football club based in Gijón, in the autonomous community of Asturias.

== History ==
Founded in 1939 by the merger between Club Gijón and Oriamendi FC, RD Oriamendi started playing in Segunda División, but was relegated despite finishing fourth due to the league's new rules. After playing three seasons in the regional leagues, the club achieved promotion to Tercera División but subsequently merged with Club Hispania de Gijón, becoming Real Deportivo Oriamendi Hispania.

The new club changed its name to Real Deportivo Gijonés in 1945, and was Sporting de Gijón's farm team. It played four seasons in Tercera before folding in 1948.

== Season to season ==
Season	Tier	Division	Place	Copa del Rey
1939–40	2	2ª	4th	
1940–41	4	1ª Reg.	3rd	
1941–42	3	1ª Reg.	1st	
1942–43	3	1ª Reg.	2nd	
1943–44	3	3ª	2nd	

- 1 season in Segunda División
- 1 season in Tercera División
