= Avelino Álvarez =

Spanish pharmacist and footballer

Personal information
- Full name: Avelino Álvarez Villanueva
- Date of birth: 4 November 1911
- Place of birth: Mieres, Asturias, Spain
- Date of death: 16 August 1991 (aged 79)
- Position: Midfielder

Senior career*
Years	Team	Apps	(Gls)
1930–1931	San Pedro CF		
1931–1932	Imperio CF		
1932–1934	Real Madrid		
1932–1933	→ Elche CF (on loan)		
1934–1936	Real Valladolid		
- * Club domestic league appearances and goals

Avelino Álvarez Villanueva (4 November 1911 – 16 August 1991) was a Spanish pharmacist and footballer who played as a midfielder for Madrid FC and Real Valladolid.

== Early life and family ==
Avelino Álvarez was born on 4 November 1911 in Mieres, Asturias, as the son of Florentina Villanueva Viejo Álvarez and teacher José Álvarez Losa, who also owned a mine and other businesses in Turón, which allowed the couple to enjoy a comfortable economic position and give their seven children higher education in Madrid to keep them away from the world of the coal business.

Three of his brothers (Ramón, Carlos, and Luis) were doctors; another, José, was an engineer, but Avelino became a pharmacist. As for the two sisters, Carmen, born in 1907, studied Educational Sciences, although she did not go on to practice, because her marriage in 1934 introduced her into Madrid's high society where it was frowned upon for women to work. When the Spanish Civil War broke out, she was caught in Republican Madrid with her newborn daughter, while her husband had stayed in Salamanca, and was then accused of collaborating with the fifth column and sentenced to death, a sentence that was commuted to 20 years of hard labor in the women's prison, where she remained until the entry of the national troops. Her other sister María de la Luz, however, was not so lucky, as she was shot in one of the checas in Madrid.

== Playing career ==
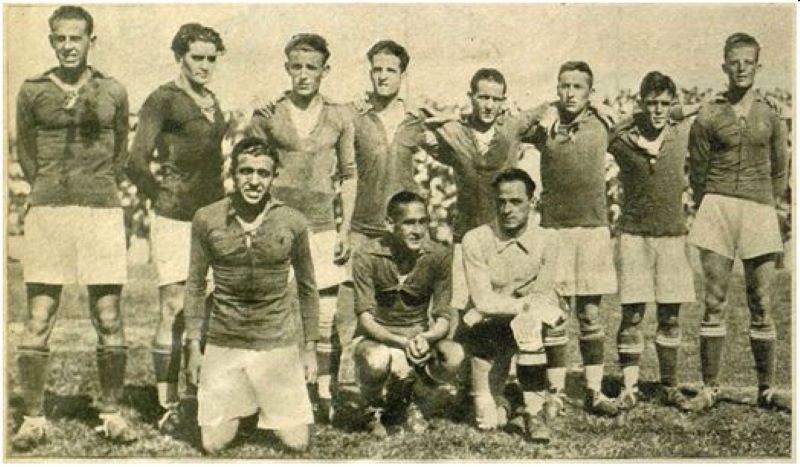
Álvarez (standing, second from left) with the Imperio squad that was proclaimed amateur champion of Spain in 1932.

Unlike his brothers, Álvarez was more drawn to sport and soon revealed himself to be a good football player, so he started playing for the San Pedro CF in 1930, and in the following year, in 1931, he moved to Imperio CF, which was a team made up of students and civil guards, but it also served as a subsidiary and youth team of Real Madrid. In his first season at the club, he played a crucial role in helping Imperio win the Spanish Amateur Championship, so he was signed Real Madrid, where he had few chances.

In his first season at the club, he did not play a single official match, being loaned to Elche to gain experience, while the few friendlies that he played for Madrid were of such little importance that not even the starters were called up. He thus appears as a reserve for the squad between 1932 and 1934, and finally got his breakthrough during his second season, when he was called up to replace the injured Luis Valle in the fifth round of the regional championship. In total, he only played seven league games in the first team as a midfielder, featuring alongside the likes of Ricardo Zamora, Félix Quesada, Josep Samitier, and Luis Regueiro. In an interview published in Ecos del Valle in November 1984, Álvarez confessed to journalist Amadeo Gancedo that at that time, with Pablo Hernández Coronado as manager, he earned 650 pesetas a month, while the main starters earned a thousand, a salary that in those days was extraordinary.

At the end of the 1933–34 season, his studies took him to Valladolid, where he joined the ranks of Real Valladolid, then in the Segunda División, remaining there until the outbreak of the Civil War in 1936, which put a sudden end to his footballing career. He was known as El Caracolillo because of his messy hair. Under pressure from his family, he returned to his hometown to dedicate himself to pharmacy and develop his life by participating in the social life of Turón.

== Later life and death ==
On 1 January 1983, after spending 43 years attending to the medical needs of his neighbors, Álvarez retired, becoming a figure who continued to combine his love of mountains and hunting with playing Julepe daily and an outstanding activity linked to social, cultural, and sports movements, even as a municipal mayor, which led to a tribute paid to him by the Turonese group on 21 March 1986, in which more than 300 people representing everything that Turón counted as associations or clubs of all kinds, celebrating his retirement . The people of Turón considered him "a silent humanist", always committed to his craft and hometown.

Álvarez died in a Madrid residence in the second fortnight of August 1991, at the age of 79.

== Honours ==
Real Madrid

- Copa del Rey:
  - Champions (1): 1934

== See also ==
- List of Real Madrid CF players
