= Juan Ochoantezana =

Spanish footballer and manager (1912–1998)

Personal information
- Full name: Juan Ochoantezana Milicua
- Date of birth: 25 October 1912
- Place of birth: Plentzia, Biscay, Spain
- Date of death: 10 February 1998 (aged 85)
- Place of death: Spain
- Position: Forward

Senior career*
| Years | Team | Apps | (Gls) |
| 1933–1934 | Gimnástico | | |
| 1934–1935 | Valencia | 4 | (0) |
| 1935–1936 | Arenas de Getxo | | |
| 1940–1942 | Arenas de Getxo | | |
| 1942–1943 | Barakaldo | | |
| 1943–1945 | Real Madrid | 1 | (0) |
| 1945–1948 | Indautxu | | |

Managerial career
- 1951–1952: Getxo
- 1952–1955: Racing de Santander
- 1955–1958: Sabadell
- 1958–1960: Real Zaragoza
- 1960: Recreativo de Huelva
- 1960–1961: Málaga
- 1961–1962: Deportivo de La Coruña
- 1962–1963: Real Oviedo
- 1963–1964: Athletic Bilbao
- 1964–1965: Deportivo de La Coruña
- 1965–1966: Pontevedra
- 1966–1967: Las Palmas
- 1967–1968: Real Oviedo
- 1968–1970: Osasuna
- 1970–1971: Pontevedra
- * Club domestic league appearances and goals

Juan Ochoantezana Milicua (25 October 1912 – 10 February 1998), also known as Juanito Ochoa, was a Spanish footballer who played as a forward for Real Madrid in the early 1940s.

He later worked as a manager in the 1950s and 1960s, taking charge of several clubs, such as Racing de Santander, Real Zaragoza, Deportivo de La Coruña, Real Oviedo, and Athletic Bilbao.

== Playing career ==
Juan Ochoantezana was born on 25 October 1912 in the Biscayan town of Plentzia, but it was in Valencia where he began his football career, joining the ranks of third division team Gimnástico in 1933, aged 21, where he quickly stood out from the rest, so in the following year, in 1934, he was signed by top-flight club Valencia CF, with whom he played for just one season, starting in only four La Liga matches. Perhaps unsatisfied by his lack of playing time, he left the club at the end of the season to join second division team Arenas de Getxo, where his career was interrupted by the outbreak of the Spanish Civil War. Once the conflict was over, he returned to Arenas for two more seasons between 1940 and 1942, and then had brief stints at Barakaldo (1942–43), Deportivo Alavés, Real Valladolid, and Real Madrid. With the latter team, he only played a single official match, a La Liga fixture against Real Oviedo on 5 March 1944.

After leaving Madrid in 1945, Ochoa joined Indautxu, then in the third division, with whom he played for three years, until 1948, when he retired at the age of 36.

== Managerial career ==
After his career as a player ended, Ochoa remained linked to football, now as a coach, taking charge of Getxo, which he oversaw in the 1951–52 season, after which he took over Racing de Santander, then in the top-flight, which he led for three seasons, until 1955, when he left due to the club's relegation. He then took over Sabadell, which he oversaw for three seasons, from 1955 until 1958, when he was signed by another top-flight club, Real Zaragoza, where he stayed for two seasons, surviving relegation on both occasions. In his first season there, the club conceded 60 goals in just 30 matches, finishing ninth in the league.

After a short stint at the helm of Recreativo de Huelva, Ochoa was appointed as the new coach Málaga CF on 25 July 1960, a position that he held for nearly a year, until 3 June 1961, overseeing a total of 32 matches, which ended in 11 wins, 6 draws, and 15 losses, with his team scoring 43 goals and conceding 54.

In 1961, Ochoa took charge of Deportivo de La Coruña, which he guided to a triumph in the 1961–62 Segunda División, thus achieving promotion to La Liga, a feat that earned him a move to the top-flight club Real Oviedo, where he only stayed for a little over a year, from 8 May 1962 until 31 May 1963. Under his leadership, Real Oviedo claimed five consecutive victories against Deportivo (1–0), Valencia (2–0), Sevilla (2–3), Atlético Madrid (3–0), and Zaragoza (1–0), thus setting a club record.

Ochoantezana then coached several top-flight clubs, such as Athletic Bilbao (1963–64), Deportivo de La Coruña (1964–65), Pontevedra (1965–66), and Las Palmas (1966–67), before finally returning to the second division in 1967, now at the helm of Real Oviedo. In September 1967, he oversaw Oviedo in a friendly match against Argentine club Boca Juniors, then touring Europe, which ended in a 1–2 loss. The following year, in 1968, he took over the third division side Osasuna, which he led to its largest-ever victory on 24 March 1969, a 11–1 trashing of Binéfar.

== Death ==
Ochoantezana died on 10 February 1998, at the age of 85.

== Honours ==
=== As a manager ===
Deportivo de La Coruña

- Segunda División:
  - Champions (1): 1961–62

== See also ==
- List of Real Madrid CF players
- List of Segunda División winning managers
