= Pablo Osán =

Spanish footballer

Personal information
- Full name: Pablo Osán Ascaso
- Date of birth: 3 February 2007 (age 19)
- Place of birth: Huesca, Spain
- Height: 1.82 m (6 ft 0 in)
- Position: Winger

Team information
- Current team: Huesca B
- Number: 28

Youth career
- Huesca

Senior career*
Years	Team	Apps	(Gls)
2024–	Huesca B	15	(5)
2026–	Huesca	1	(0)
- * Club domestic league appearances and goals as of 31 May 2026

Pablo Osán Ascaso (born 11 January 2003) is a Spanish footballer who plays as a left winger for SD Huesca B.

== Career ==
Born in Huesca, Aragon, Osán was a SD Huesca youth graduate. He made his senior debut with the reserves on 22 December 2024, coming on as a second-half substitute and scoring the team's only in a 3–1 Tercera Federación home loss to CD Zuera.

Osán subsequently started to feature more regularly with the B-team, and made his first team debut on 31 May 2026, replacing Dani Ojeda in a 1–1 Segunda División away draw against Córdoba CF, as his side was already relegated.
