= 1939–40 Segunda División =

9th season of the second-tier football league in Spain

Segunda División
- Season: 1939–40
- Champions: Murcia FC
- Promoted: Murcia FC
- Relegated: Deportivo Alavés; Alicante FC; Burjasot FC; Ceuta SC; Constancia FC; Elche FC; Erandio Club; AD Ferroviaria; EC Granollers; Imperial FC; Imperio FC; CD Mallorca; Ónuba FC; RD Oriamendi; Sestao SC; EHA Tánger; Gimnástica Torrelavega
- Matches: 280
- Goals: 1,127 (4.03 per match)
- Top goalscorer: Fernando Terán (24 goals)
- Best goalkeeper: Juan Acuña (0.71 goals/match)

The 1939–40 Segunda División season, the first after a three-year hiatus caused by the Spanish Civil War, saw 40 teams participate in the second flight Spanish league. Murcia was promoted to Primera División. RD Oriamendi, Sestao, Alavés, Erandio, Granollers, Ferroviaria, Imperio de Madrid, Mallorca, Constancia, Elche, Alicante, Burjassot, Imperial de Murcia, Ceuta SC, Onuba and Tánger were relegated to Tercera División due to a Federation decision.

== Group I ==
=== Teams ===
Location of teams in Segunda División 1939-40 G-1

Club	City	Stadium
Stadium Club Avilesino	Avilés	Las Arobias
RCD Coruña	La Coruña	Riazor
Club Ferrol	Ferrol	Inferniño
Real Gijón	Gijón	El Molinón
RD Oriamendi	Gijón	Los Frenos
UD Salamanca	Salamanca	El Calvario
Deportivo Torrelavega	Torrelavega	Campos del Malecón
Real Valladolid Deportivo	Valladolid	José Zorrilla

=== League table ===
Pos	Team	Pld	W	D	L	GF	GA	GD	Pts	Qualification or relegation
1	RC Deportivo	14	10	2	2	38	10	+28	22	Promotion playoff
2	Club Ferrol	14	8	5	1	40	15	+25	21	
3	Real Gijón CF	14	7	3	4	28	17	+11	17	
4	RD Oriamendi	14	7	2	5	30	29	+1	16	Relegated to Tercera División
5	UD Salamanca	14	4	4	6	25	36	−11	12	
6	Real Valladolid	14	4	0	10	24	35	−11	8	
7	Stadium Avilesino	14	3	2	9	20	40	−20	8	
8	Gimnástica Torrelavega	14	3	2	9	16	39	−23	8	

Source: BDFútbol

=== Results ===
Home \ Away	DEP	ORI	RAC	SAL	SPO	STA	TOR	VAL
Deportivo de La Coruña		4–0	1–0	9–0	2–0	6–0	4–0	4–1
RD Oriamendi	3–2		2–3	5–3	0–2	3–1	5–1	3–1
Club Ferrol	1–1	2–0		4–0	1–1	5–0	8–1	2–1
UD Salamanca	0–0	4–1	1–2		1–1	2–1	3–0	8–1
Real Gijón CF	3–0	1–2	1–1	5–1		2–4	2–0	2–1
Stadium Avilesino	1–2	1–1	2–6	0–0	0–2		3–1	6–2
Gimnástica Torrelavega	1–2	4–2	1–1	2–2	0–3	4–1		1–0
Real Valladolid	0–1	0–1	1–4	5–0	4–3	4–0	3–0	

Source: BDFútbol
Legend: Blue = home team win; Yellow = draw; Red = away team win.

== Group II ==
=== Teams ===
Location of teams in Segunda División 1939-40 G-2

Club	City	Stadium
Deportivo Alavés	Vitoria	Mendizorroza
Arenas Club	Guecho	Ibaiondo
Baracaldo-Oriamendi	Baracaldo	Lasesarre
Donostia CF	San Sebastián	Atocha
Erandio Club	Erandio	Machaqueo
CA Osasuna	Pamplona	San Juan
Sestao SC	Sestao	Las Llanas
Unión Club	Irun	Stadium Gal

=== League table ===
Pos	Team	Pld	W	D	L	GF	GA	GD	Pts	Qualification or relegation
1	Donostia CF	14	12	1	1	53	11	+42	25	Promotion playoff
2	Osasuna	14	10	1	3	34	11	+23	21	
3	Unión Irún	14	6	2	6	24	32	−8	14	
4	Sestao	14	4	5	5	27	31	−4	13	Relegated to Tercera División
5	Baracaldo-Oriamendi	14	4	4	6	19	25	−6	12	
6	Erandio	14	5	1	8	24	30	−6	11	Relegated to Tercera División
7	Arenas de Guecho	14	4	1	9	25	44	−19	9	
8	Alavés	14	3	1	10	15	37	−22	7	Relegated to Tercera División

Source: BDFútbol

=== Results ===
Home \ Away	ALA	ARE	BAR	ERA	OSA	DON	SES	UNI
Deportivo Alavés		3–4	0–0	3–2	0–2	0–6	3–2	3–2
Arenas de Guecho	3–0		1–1	3–1	1–5	2–6	1–4	4–0
Baracaldo-Oriamendi	2–0	4–2		4–2	3–2	0–3	2–2	1–3
Erandio	1–0	4–0	2–0		0–1	1–3	4–0	1–0
Osasuna	2–1	3–0	3–0	2–1		2–1	6–0	4–1
Donostia CF	2–0	7–0	3–1	8–0	2–1		4–0	1–1
Sestao SC	3–1	3–2	1–1	3–3	0–0	1–2		6–0
Unión Irún	5–2	3–2	1–0	3–2	1–0	2–5	2–2	

Source: BDFútbol
Legend: Blue = home team win; Yellow = draw; Red = away team win.

== Group III ==
=== Teams ===
Location of teams in Segunda División 1939-40 G-3

Club	City	Stadium
FC Badalona	Badalona	Avenida de Navarra
CD Castellón	Castellón de la Plana	Campo del Sequiol
Constancia FC	Inca	Camp d’Es Cos
Gerona CF	Gerona	Vista Alegre
EC Granollers	Granollers	Avenida Girona
UD Levante-Gimnástico	Valencia	Vallejo
CD Mallorca	Palma de Mallorca	Buenos Aires
CD Sabadell FC	Sabadell	Cruz Alta

=== League table ===
Pos	Team	Pld	W	D	L	GF	GA	GD	Pts	Qualification or relegation
1	UD Levante Gimnástico	14	9	2	3	33	19	+14	20	Promotion playoff
2	CD Sabadell	14	7	2	5	27	23	+4	16	
3	Gerona CF	14	6	3	5	27	24	+3	15	
4	CD Castellón	14	7	0	7	26	23	+3	14	
5	Constancia	14	6	2	6	22	29	−7	14	Relegated to Tercera División
6	Granollers SC	14	6	2	6	31	29	+2	14	Relegated to Tercera División
7	Mallorca	14	5	3	6	32	27	+5	13	Relegated to Tercera División
8	CF Badalona	14	3	0	11	25	49	−24	6	

Source: BDFútbol

=== Results ===
Home \ Away	BAD	CAS	CON	GER	GRA	LEV	MAL	SAB
CF Badalona		4–2	3–1	1–2	1–3	1–2	4–3	0–1
CD Castellón	3–1		5–1	0–2	3–0	1–2	3–2	2–0
Constancia	4–2	3–1		1–3	2–0	3–2	1–1	1–0
Gerona CF	5–1	0–1	3–1		1–1	1–2	2–4	2–2
Granollers SC	5–2	1–3	4–1	3–1		4–1	6–1	0–3
UD Levante Gimnástico	6–2	2–0	4–0	3–1	1–1		2–2	4–0
Mallorca	6–0	3–1	1–2	2–2	4–1	0–1		2–0
CD Sabadell	6–3	2–1	1–1	2–3	6–2	3–1	2–1	

Source: BDFútbol
Legend: Blue = home team win; Yellow = draw; Red = away team win.

== Group IV ==
=== Teams ===
Location of teams in Segunda División 1939-40 G-4

Club	City	Stadium
Alicante FC	Alicante	La Viña
Burjasot FC	Burjassot	El Basot
Cartagena CF	Cartagena	El Almarjal
Elche FC	Elche	Altabix
AD Ferroviaria	Madrid	Campo de Delicias
Imperial FC	Murcia	Zarandona
Imperio FC	Madrid	El Cafeto
Murcia FC	Murcia	La Condomina

=== League table ===
Pos	Team	Pld	W	D	L	GF	GA	GD	Pts	Qualification or relegation
1	Murcia CF	14	11	0	3	38	16	+22	22	Promotion playoff
2	AD Ferroviaria	14	10	0	4	41	24	+17	20	Relegated to Tercera División
3	Alicante CF	14	6	2	6	27	33	−6	14	Relegated to Tercera División
4	Imperio de Madrid	14	6	2	6	32	33	−1	14	Relegated to Tercera División
5	Cartagena FC	14	5	3	6	17	26	−9	13	
6	Burjassot CF	14	5	2	7	38	33	+5	12	Relegated to Tercera División
7	Elche CF	14	3	3	8	20	30	−10	9	Relegated to Tercera División
8	Imperial de Murcia	14	3	2	9	20	38	−18	8	Relegated to Tercera División

Source: BDFútbol

=== Results ===
Home \ Away	ALI	BUR	CAR	ELC	FER	IMP	I.M	MUR
Alicante CF		3–2	1–2	3–2	5–4	5–1	2–0	2–3
Burjassot CF	4–2		1–2	5–2	0–4	5–0	3–3	2–4
Cartagena FC	1–2	0–0		4–1	0–0	1–0	0–1	2–0
Elche CF	0–0	1–0	2–2		1–2	4–1	3–2	0–2
AD Ferroviaria	4–1	2–0	5–1	3–1		3–1	5–3	2–1
Imperial de Murcia	3–0	2–8	1–0	1–1	2–2		2–0	0–1
Imperio de Madrid	1–1	2–5	4–1	3–2	4–3	5–2		2–4
Murcia CF	6–0	6–3	4–0	2–0	3–0	2–1	0–2	

Source: BDFútbol
Legend: Blue = home team win; Yellow = draw; Red = away team win.

== Group V ==
=== Teams ===
Location of teams in Segunda División 1939-40 G-5

Club	City	Stadium
Cádiz CF	Cádiz	La Mirandilla
Ceuta SC	Ceuta	Campo de Deportes
Racing FC Córdoba	Córdoba	América
CD Malacitano	Málaga	Baños del Carmen
Ónuba FC	Huelva	Velódromo
Recreativo Granada	Granada	Los Cármenes
EHA Tánger	Tangier	El Marchán
Xerez CF	Jerez de la Frontera	Domecq

=== League table ===
Pos	Team	Pld	W	D	L	GF	GA	GD	Pts	Qualification or relegation
1	Cádiz CF	14	11	1	2	40	15	+25	23	Promotion playoff
2	Recreativo Granada	14	9	4	1	36	16	+20	22	
3	CD Malacitano	14	9	2	3	36	19	+17	20	
4	Racing FC Córdoba	14	6	2	6	33	35	−2	14	
5	Jerez CF	14	5	4	5	21	23	−2	14	
6	Onuba FC	14	3	3	8	29	43	−14	9	Relegated to Tercera División
7	Ceuta SC	14	4	1	9	19	33	−14	9	Relegated to Tercera División
8	EHA Tánger	14	0	1	13	15	45	−30	1	Relegated to Tercera División

Source: BDFútbol

=== Results ===
Home \ Away	CAD	CEU	COR	MAL	ONU	REC	TAN	XER
Cádiz CF		4–0	4–0	4–0	4–1	2–2	2–0	2–0
Ceuta SC	1–2		2–4	2–1	2–1	0–1	2–1	1–2
Racing FC Córdoba	1–2	3–2		1–3	3–2	1–1	5–3	2–3
CD Malacitano	5–3	4–0	1–1		7–1	2–0	4–2	1–1
Onuba FC	1–4	3–1	5–3	1–2		2–2	5–2	2–2
Recreativo Granada	2–1	5–1	5–2	1–0	7–2		4–1	2–0
EHA Tánger	1–4	0–3	1–4	1–2	2–2	1–3		0–3
Jerez CF	1–2	2–2	1–3	1–4	2–1	1–1	2–0	

Source: BDFútbol
Legend: Blue = home team win; Yellow = draw; Red = away team win.

== Playoffs ==
The winner of each of the five groups formed a double round-robin playoff group, from which the champion would secure automatic promotion while the second-placed team went into a further playoff against the third-last team from the 1939–40 Primera División.

The runners-up from the five groups were to play a consolation tournament called the FEF President Cup. Group I runner-up CD Malacitano declined to enter and were replaced by third-place Racing de Ferrol, who won the tournament.

=== First promotion playoff ===
Pos	Team	Pld	W	D	L	GF	GA	GD	Pts	Promotion or qualification
1	Real Murcia CF	8	4	1	3	15	16	−1	9	Promoted to Primera División
2	RC Deportivo	8	4	1	3	15	11	+4	9	Promotion/relegation playoff
3	Cádiz CF	8	3	3	2	16	13	+3	9	
4	UD Levante Gimnástico	8	3	2	3	13	14	−1	8	
5	Donostia CF	8	2	1	5	12	17	−5	5	

Source: BDFútbol

=== Results ===
Home \ Away	CAD	DEP	DON	LEV	MUR
Cádiz CF		2–1	5–0	3–3	0–2
Deportivo La Coruña	2–2		1–0	3–0	3–0
Donostia CF	0–1	1–3		2–3	3–1
UD Levante Gimnástico	1–1	3–0	0–3		2–0
Real Murcia CF	4–2	3–2	3–3	2–1	

Source: Resultados Fútbol
Legend: Blue = home team win; Yellow = draw; Red = away team win.

=== Promotion/relegation playoff ===
The match was at a neutral venue, Real Madrid's Estadio Chamartín. Celta's win meant they stayed in the Primera División for the following season and Deportivo stayed in the Segunda División.

Team 1	Score	Team 2
Celta	1–0	Deportivo
