= SD Huesca B =

Association football club in Spain

Huesca B
- Full name: Sociedad Deportiva Huesca, S.A.D., "B"
- Founded: 1950 (as GD Lamusa EyD); 2003 (refounded); 2017 (refounded)
- Ground: Complejo Deportivo Aquavox San Jorge, Huesca, Aragon, Spain
- Capacity: 1,000
- Owner: Fundación Alcoraz
- President: Manuel Torres
- Head coach: Luis Arcas
- League: Tercera Federación – Group 17
- 2025–26: Tercera Federación – Group 17, 6th of 18
- Website: sdhuesca.es
Home colours	Third colours

Sociedad Deportiva Huesca "B" is a Spanish football team based in Huesca, in the autonomous community of Aragon. The reserve team of SD Huesca was initially founded in 1950, and plays in Tercera Federación – Group 17, holding home matches at Complejo Deportivo San Jorge.

== History ==
Founded in the 1950 summer as Grupo Deportivo Lamusa Educación y Descanso, the club was incorporated into SD Huesca's structure in 1976, being promoted to Tercera División in the first season after that. Immediately relegated back, the club suffered another relegation before ceasing activities in 1989.

Huesca B returned to an active status in 2003, only playing four seasons in the two lowest divisions of the Aragonese football before ceasing activities again in 2007. Ten years later, the club returned in the Tercera Regional (seventh division), and achieved three consecutive promotions until reaching the fourth tier in 2020. Another promotion followed in 2021, to the new fourth tier called Segunda División RFEF.

== Season to season ==
- As GD Lamusa EyD

Season	Tier	Division	Place	Copa del Rey
1950–1957	—	Regional	—	
1957–58	4	1ª Reg.	8th	
1958–59	4	1ª Reg.	7th	
1959–60	4	1ª Reg.	10th	
1960–61	4	1ª Reg.	6th	
1961–62	4	1ª Reg.	1st	
1962–63	4	1ª Reg.	1st	
1963–64	4	1ª Reg.	2nd	
1964–65	4	1ª Reg.	5th	
1965–66	4	1ª Reg.	2nd	

Season	Tier	Division	Place	Copa del Rey
1966–67	4	1ª Reg.	2nd	
1967–68	4	1ª Reg.	2nd	
1968–69	4	Reg. Pref.	4th	
1969–70	4	Reg. Pref.	8th	
1970–71	4	Reg. Pref.	5th	
1971–72	4	Reg. Pref.	16th	
1972–73	4	Reg. Pref.	8th	
1973–74	4	Reg. Pref.	20th	
1974–75	5	1ª Reg.	7th	
1975–76	5	1ª Reg.	2nd	

- As SD Huesca B

Season	Tier	Division	Place	Copa del Rey
1976–77	4	Reg. Pref.	5th	
1977–78	4	3ª	19th	First round
1978–79	5	Reg. Pref.	18th	
1979–80	6	1ª Reg.	11th	
1980–81	6	1ª Reg.	9th	
1981–82	6	1ª Reg.	1st	
1982–83	5	Reg. Pref.	20th	
1983–84	6	1ª Reg.	6th	
1984–85	6	1ª Reg.	5th	
1985–86	6	1ª Reg.	4th	
1986–87	6	1ª Reg.	4th	
1987–88	5	Reg. Pref.	13th	
1988–89	5	Reg. Pref.	15th	
1989–2003	DNP			DNP
2003–04	7	2ª Reg.	1st	DNP
2004–05	6	1ª Reg.	8th	DNP
2005–06	6	1ª Reg.	15th	DNP
2006–07	6	1ª Reg.	10th	DNP
2007–2017	DNP			DNP
2017–18	7	2ª Reg.	1st	DNP

Season	Tier	Division	Place
2018–19	6	1ª Reg.	2nd
2019–20	5	Reg. Pref.	1st
2020–21	4	3ª	2nd / 3rd
2021–22	4	2ª RFEF	17th
2022–23	5	3ª Fed.	3rd
2023–24	5	3ª Fed.	11th
2024–25	5	3ª Fed.	2nd
2025–26	5	3ª Fed.	6th
2026–27	5	3ª Fed.	

- 1 season in Segunda División RFEF
- 2 seasons in Tercera División
- 5 seasons in Tercera Federación

== Current squad ==
As of 8 April 2026

Note: Flags indicate national team as defined under FIFA eligibility rules; some limited exceptions apply. Players may hold more than one non-FIFA nationality.

No.	Pos.	Nation	Player
1	GK	ESP	Jaime García
2	DF	ESP	Toni de la Fuente
3	DF	ESP	Guille Lobato
4	DF	MAR	Moha Saadouni
5	DF	ECU	Diego Almeida
6	DF	ESP	Álex Calvo
7	FW	ESP	Gerard Solá
8	MF	ESP	Izan Ruiz
9	FW	ESP	Raúl Ojeda
10	MF	AND	Aron Rodrigo
11	FW	BIH	Harun Ploco
13	GK	POL	Alan Pawel

No.	Pos.	Nation	Player
14	DF	ESP	Diego Hernández
16	MF	ESP	Juan Cano
17	DF	ESP	Lucas Sauvage
18	DF	ESP	Juan Aguilar
19	MF	ESP	Nicolás Fontán
20	DF	ESP	Marc Aznar
21	MF	ESP	Nacho Plaza
22	DF	ESP	Eloy Gil
24	MF	KSA	Hussain Al-Taha
25	GK	ESP	Nicolás Azagra
28	FW	ESP	Pablo Osán
29	MF	ESP	Abel Seral

=== From Youth Academy ===
Note: Flags indicate national team as defined under FIFA eligibility rules; some limited exceptions apply. Players may hold more than one non-FIFA nationality.

No.	Pos.	Nation	Player
—	GK	BOL	Jordi Saucedo
—	DF	BEL	Zéno Stassin
—	MF	VIE	Trương Gia Khôi
26	MF	ESP	Max Chatiliez
27	FW	ESP	Mario Blasco
—	FW	AUT	Cassian Kogler

== See also ==
- SD Huesca
- CD Teruel
