= Lucas Terrer =

Spanish footballer

Personal information
- Full name: Lucas Terrer Casas
- Date of birth: 7 June 2005 (age 21)
- Place of birth: Zaragoza, Spain
- Height: 1.78 m (5 ft 10 in)
- Position: Midfielder

Team information
- Current team: Zaragoza B
- Number: 30

Youth career
- Zaragoza

Senior career*
Years	Team	Apps	(Gls)
2023–	Zaragoza B	56	(0)
2024–	Zaragoza	12	(0)

International career
2022	Spain U17	2	(0)
- * Club domestic league appearances and goals as of 9 June 2026

Lucas Terrer Casas (born 7 June 2005) is a Spanish footballer who plays as a midfielder for Deportivo Aragón.

== Club career ==
Born in Zaragoza, Aragon, Terrer was a youth product of hometown side Real Zaragoza. He made his senior debut with the reserves on 12 March 2023, coming on as a second-half substitute in a 0–0 Segunda Federación away draw against CE Manresa.

Terrer made his first team debut on 3 March 2024, coming on as a late substitute for Toni Moya in a 1–0 Segunda División home loss to SD Amorebieta.

== International career ==
In April 2022, Terrer appeared with the Spain national under-17 team.
