= Marcos Cuenca =

Spanish footballer

Personal information
- Full name: Marcos Cuenca Aranda
- Date of birth: 7 November 2002 (age 24)
- Place of birth: Zaragoza, Spain
- Height: 1.84 m (6 ft 0 in)
- Position: Forward

Team information
- Current team: Zaragoza
- Number: 23

Youth career
- 2016–2021: Zaragoza
- 2019–2020: → Ebro (loan)

Senior career*
| Years | Team | Apps | (Gls) |
| 2021–2025 | Zaragoza B | 64 | (16) |
| 2021–2022 | → Brea (loan) | 33 | (4) |
| 2023– | Zaragoza | 34 | (1) |
- * Club domestic league appearances and goals as of 9 June 2026

Marcos Cuenca Aranda (born 7 November 2002) is a Spanish footballer who plays as a forward for Real Zaragoza.

== Career ==
Cuenca was born in Zaragoza, and joined Real Zaragoza's youth setup in 2016, aged 13. On 24 July 2021, after finishing his formation, he was loaned to Segunda División RFEF side CD Brea for the season.

Cuenca made his senior debut on 5 September 2021, starting in a 2–1 away loss to Cerdanyola del Vallès FC, and scored his first goal seven days later by netting the opener in a 1–1 home draw against Terrassa FC. He returned to his parent club in June 2022 after being regularly used, and was assigned to the reserves now also in the fourth division.

Cuenca made his first team – and professional – debut for the Maños on 11 November 2023, coming on as a late substitute for Manu Vallejo in a 2–0 Segunda División away loss to Elche CF. The following 1 July, he renewed his contract with the club until 2028, and was definitely promoted to the main squad on 1 September 2025, being assigned the number 23 jersey.
