= Marc Aznar =

Spanish footballer

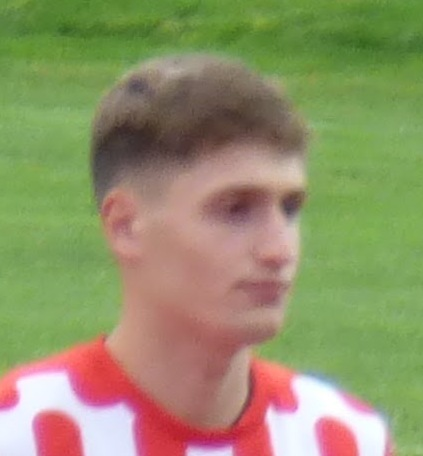
- Aznar with Girona in 2024

Personal information
- Full name: Marc Aznar Baides
- Date of birth: 10 January 2006 (age 20)
- Place of birth: Barcelona, Spain
- Height: 1.88 m (6 ft 2 in)
- Position: Centre-back

Team information
- Current team: Huesca

Youth career
- Molinos
- Sant Gabriel
- 2018–2025: Girona

Senior career*
Years	Team	Apps	(Gls)
2022–2025	Girona B	32	(0)
2025–2026	Huesca B	21	(2)
2026–	Huesca	1	(0)

International career
2022	Spain U16	2	(0)
2023	Spain U17	1	(0)
- * Club domestic league appearances and goals as of 31 May 2026

Marc Aznar Baides (born 10 January 2006) is a Spanish footballer who plays as a centre-back for SD Huesca.

== Club career ==
Born in Barcelona, Catalonia, Aznar joined Girona FC's youth sides in 2018, after representing CE Sant Gabriel and UD Molinos. In July 2022, he renewed his contract until 2025, and made his debut with the reserves on 6 November of that year, starting in a 0–0 Tercera Federación away draw against UE Rapitenca.

Aznar alternated between the Juvenil and B-team squads in the following years, also training with the first team on some occasions. In August 2025, he moved to another reserve team, SD Huesca B also in the fifth division.

Aznar made his first team debut on 31 May 2026, coming on as a half-time substitute for Javi Mier in a 1–1 Segunda División away draw against Córdoba CF, as Huesca was already relegated. On 22 June, he renewed his contract until 2028 and was definitely promoted to the main squad.

== International career ==
Aznar represented Spain at under-16 and under-17 levels.
