= Juan Jesús Aquino Calvo =

Mexican politician (born 1975)

- Born: 27 August 1975 (age 50); Ocosingo, Chiapas, Mexico
- Occupation: Deputy
- Political party: PAN

Juan Jesús Aquino Calvo (born 27 August 1975) is a Mexican politician affiliated with the PAN. As of 2013, he served as Deputy of the LXII Legislature of the Mexican Congress representing Chiapas.
