= Hugo Pinilla =

Spanish footballer

Personal information
- Full name: Hugo Pinilla Ruiz
- Date of birth: 28 April 2006 (age 20)
- Place of birth: Zaragoza, Spain
- Height: 1.85 m (6 ft 1 in)
- Position: Winger

Team information
- Current team: Zaragoza
- Number: 31

Youth career
- 2016–2024: Zaragoza

Senior career*
Years	Team	Apps	(Gls)
2024–	Zaragoza B	38	(6)
2025–	Zaragoza	15	(0)
- * Club domestic league appearances and goals as of 9 June 2026

Hugo Pinilla Ruiz (born 28 April 2006) is a Spanish footballer who plays as a winger for Real Zaragoza.

== Career ==
Born in Zaragoza, Aragon, Pinilla was a Real Zaragoza youth graduate. He made his senior debut with the reserves on 5 May 2024, coming on as a late substitute for Antonio Sola in a 4–3 Segunda Federación away loss to CD Calahorra.

On 13 September 2024, Pinilla renewed his contract with the Maños. He made his first team debut the following 30 May, replacing fellow youth graduate Pau Sans in a 4–1 Segunda División away loss to CD Castellón.

On 12 March 2026, Pinilla further extended his link with Zaragoza until 2030.
