= Antonio Barrios (footballer) =

Spanish footballer and coach

Personal information
- Full name: Antonio Barrios Seoane
- Date of birth: 21 May 1910
- Place of birth: Getxo, Spain
- Date of death: 19 August 2002 (aged 92)
- Place of death: San Sebastián, Spain
- Position: Forward

Senior career*
Years	Team	Apps	(Gls)
1931	Castilla		
1932	Erandio		
1932–1934	Arenas de Getxo	20	(5)
1934–1945	Real Valladolid	82	(11)

Managerial career
- 1945–1948: Real Valladolid
- 1949–1950: Real Valladolid
- 1950–1951: Racing de Santander
- 1951–1952: CD Málaga
- 1952–1954: Athletic Bilbao
- 1954–1955: Atletico Tetuán
- 1955–1957: Atlético Madrid
- 1957–1958: Real Betis
- 1959–1960: Espanyol
- 1960–1961: Elche
- 1961–1963: Sevilla
- 1963–1964: Real Sociedad
- 1964–1965: Athletic Bilbao
- 1965: Real Valladolid
- 1966–1967: Real Betis
- 1967: Sevilla
- 1968: Real Valladolid
- 1969–1971: Real Betis
- 1972: Recreativo de Huelva
- 1973–1974: Osasuna
- * Club domestic league appearances and goals

Antonio Barrios Seoane (21 May 1910 – 19 August 2002) was a Spanish professional football player and coach. He managed a number of club sides including Real Valladolid, Racing de Santander, Athletic Bilbao, Atlético Madrid, Real Betis, Espanyol, Elche, Real Sociedad, Sevilla and Recreativo de Huelva.

He also played for clubs including Arenas de Getxo and Real Valladolid.
