= Ramón Colón =

Spanish footballer and manager (1916–1999)

Personal information
- Full name: Ramón Colón Acevedo
- Date of birth: 22 March 1916
- Place of birth: Madrid, Spain
- Date of death: 1999 (aged 82-83)
- Place of death: Madrid, Spain
- Position: Defender

Senior career*
Years	Team	Apps	(Gls)
1939–1940	Imperio		
1940–1943	Atlético Aviación	8	(0)
1945–1946	Salamanca		
1947–1948	Chamberí FC		
Total		8	(0)

Managerial career
- 1952–1954: Atlético Madrid
- 1954–1955: Real Murcia
- 1955–1956: Málaga
- 1956–1958: Rayo Vallecano
- 1958–1959: Badajoz
- 1959–1961: Rayo Vallecano
- 1963–1964: Salamanca
- * Club domestic league appearances and goals

Ramón Colón Acevedo (22 March 1916 – 1999) was a Spanish footballer who played as a defender for Atlético Madrid.

He later became a manager, taking charge over Atlético Madrid, Real Murcia, and Rayo Vallecano.

== Playing career ==
Born in Madrid on 22 March 1916, Colón began playing football at his hometown club in Imperio CF in 1939, which at the time served as a subsidiary of Atlético Madrid, then known as Atlético Aviación, which signed him in 1940. He remained with the club for three seasons, playing a total of eight La Liga matches, and winning one league title in 1940–41 and the 1941–47 FEF President Cup, in which he played in only one match, a 2–0 loss to Valencia CF. In June 1941, he started for Aviación in both legs of the final of the 1940–41 Copa Presidente Federación Castellana against Real Madrid, which ended in a 3–1 victory on aggregate.

Colón then played for Salamanca and Chamberí FC before retiring in the late 1940s.

== Managerial career ==
After his career as a player ended, Colón remained linked to Atlético, now as a coach of the amateur and youth teams for several years, with which he was proclaimed champion of Spain. In January 1953, he was promoted to the first team to replace Helenio Herrera when he was dismissed. He was dismissed at the start of the 1953–54 campaign after only five days, and in the following summer, he joined Real Murcia.

Knowing like few others about the Madrid football academy, Colón brought with him two kids with huge potential, the 18-year-old Joaquín Peiró and the 20-year-old Enrique Collar. The latter was claimed in the middle of the season by his parent club, but Colón pulled another one from Real Madrid, Ramón Marsal, thus forming a team with which he achieved promotion to the First Division in the 1954–55 season, with the journalist Juan Antonio Calvo, the head of the sports section of the La Verdad newspaper stating that "of the eleven times that Murcia has risen to the First Division, it has never done so with such little suffering and as much anticipation as the one that has just occurred".

Colón later coached Málaga (1955–56), Rayo Vallecano (1956–58 and 1959–61), Badajoz (1958–59), and Salamanca (1963–64). He was also a youth coach of both Castilla and the National team.

== Death ==
Ramón Colón died in 1999, at the age of either 82 or 83.

== See also ==
- List of Segunda División winning managers

== Honours ==
=== Player ===
Atlético Madrid

- FEF President Cup:
  - Champions (1): 1941–47
- La Liga:
  - Champions (1): 1940–41
- Copa Presidente Federación Castellana:
  - Champions (1): 1940–41

=== Coach ===
Real Murcia

- Segunda División:
  - Champions (1): 1954–55
