= Juan Antonio Calvo =

Spanish professor and gymnastics educator

- Born: Juan Antonio Calvo Carazo; 22 August 1948; Nava del Rey, Valladolid, Spain
- Died: 3 June 2020 (aged 71); Murcia, Spain
- Citizenship: Spanish
- Occupations: Sports journalist; Gymnastics educator
- Known for: Co-founder of Don Balón

Juan Antonio Calvo Carazo (22 August 1948 – 3 June 2020) was a Spanish sports journalist who co-founded Don Balón in 1975.

== Early life and education ==
Juan Antonio Calvo was born on 22 August 1948 in the Valladolid town of Nava del Rey, but his family moved to Barcelona when his father, who was a soldier, was assigned there. In Barcelona, he studied law at the University of Barcelona and Journalism.

== Career ==
Calvo began his journalistic career in 1967 at the Barcelona newspaper Mundo Deportivo, where he remained as editor and head of the international football section until 1988. Almost from day one, he held positions of responsibility that allowed him to travel, meet prominent athletes, and experience major events live, such as the European Championships and the World Cups, as well as the Olympic Games. He was sent to cover the main sporting events of the time: Euro 1980, World Cup 1982, Euro 1984, and the World Cup 1986. Not to mention the Cycling Tours of Murcia with his partner in fatigue, José María Falgas.

On 7 October 1975, together with other journalists, Calvo founded the weekly sports magazine Don Balón, where he collaborated regularly. He was also the Barcelona correspondent for the national newspapers: El Alcázar, La Gaceta del Norte, Deia, and El Diario Vasco.

In the 1980s, Calvo moved to Murcia, a city where he lived for more than 30 years, until his death. There, he worked at the newspaper La Verdad, as head of sports in the Alicante editions and as editor-in-chief in Murcia. There he continued to collaborate after his retirement. During those years he was sent through the Colpisa agency as a correspondent for the Vocento newspapers, the 1992 Barcelona Olympic Games, the 1994 World Cup, the Euro 1996 Cup, and the 1998 World Cup.

As a journalist, Calvo also made inroads into television, and mainly into radio. On the former, he collaborated on the television sports program Grada 6 (Murcia), and in the radio environment, he worked as an editor in the program Radiogaceta de los Deportes, Radio Nacional de España, Radio Peninsular and as head of sports at Radio 80 (Barcelona), and at Punto Radio (Murcia).

Calvo was part of the board of directors of the Sports Press Association of the Region of Murcia, from where he participated in the organization of the national congress in Murcia (2013).

== Personal life and death ==
Calvo married Mercedes, and the couple had three children: Juan Antonio, Javier, and Carlos. His firstborn was a coach in several Tercera División teams.

Calvo died at the age of 71 in Murcia, after suffering several myocardial infarctions during his last years.
