= Deportivo Aragón =

Association football club in Spain

- Full name: Real Zaragoza Deportivo Aragón
- Founded: 1958
- Ground: Ciudad Deportiva, Zaragoza, Aragon, Spain
- Capacity: 2,500
- Owner: Fundación Zaragoza 2032
- President: Christian Lapetra
- Head coach: Emilio Larraz
- League: Tercera Federación – Group 17
- 2025–26: Segunda Federación – Group 2, 17th of 18 (relegated)
Home colours	Away colours

Real Zaragoza Deportivo Aragón is the reserve team of Real Zaragoza, a Spanish football club based in Zaragoza, in the autonomous community of Aragon. Founded in 1958, currently plays in Tercera Federación – Group 17, holding home matches at Ciudad Deportiva del Real Zaragoza, with a capacity of 2,500 seats.

== History ==
Racing Club San José was founded in 1939, being renamed to Club Deportivo San José in 1943 and to Unión Deportiva Amistad in 1948. Amistad later became a farm team of Real Zaragoza, and the club decided to create Real Zaragoza Club Deportivo Aficionados in 1958, to serve as a second reserve team behind Amistad. The latter club achieved promotion to Tercera División in their first season, being later renamed to Juventud Club de Fútbol, as no reserve teams could compete in a national division with the same name of their parent club.

Despite reaching the promotion play-offs in 1962, where they lost to Alcoyano, the club spent the following two seasons unregistered. In 1964, after Amistad was dissolved, Juventud took their place in the third division, being now named Club Deportivo Aragón.

Deportivo Aragón was renamed to Aragón Club de Fútbol in 1966, and played four seasons under that name before changing it to Deportivo Aragón. The club enjoyed their best years under that denomination, as they played eight seasons in Segunda División B, and achieved promotion to Segunda División in 1985.

In 1991, after a change in the RFEF general regulations, Deportivo Aragón was dissolved for an official reserve team to take their place, named Real Zaragoza Club Deportivo "B". In 2011, after five seasons in Tercera División, the club bought a place in Segunda División B, but suffered relegation back to the fourth tier in 2013.

In December 2013, Zaragoza B returned to their previous name of Deportivo Aragón (officially Real Zaragoza Deportivo Aragón). In the 2016–17 season the club won Tercera División, Group 17 and promoted to the Segunda División B.

== Club names ==
- Real Zaragoza Club Deportivo Aficionados - (1958–59)
- Juventud Club de Fútbol - (1959–62)
- Club Deportivo Aragón - (1964–66)
- Aragón Club de Fútbol - (1966–70)
- Deportivo Aragón - (1970–91)
- Real Zaragoza "B" - (1991–2015)
- Real Zaragoza Deportivo Aragón - (2015–)

== Season to season ==
- As Real Zaragoza CD Aficionados – Juventud CF

Season	Tier	Division	Place	Copa del Rey
1958–59	4	1ª Reg.	1st	
1959–60	3	3ª	5th	
1960–61	3	3ª	4th	
1961–62	3	3ª	2nd	

- As Deportivo Aragón – Aragón CF

Season	Tier	Division	Place	Copa del Rey
1964–65	3	3ª	5th	
1965–66	3	3ª	15th	
1966–67	3	3ª	2nd	
1967–68	3	3ª	2nd	
1968–69	3	3ª	8th	
1969–70	3	3ª	9th	
1970–71	4	Reg. Pref.	1st	
1971–72	3	3ª	18th	
1972–73	4	Reg. Pref.	11th	
1973–74	4	Reg. Pref.	2nd	
1974–75	4	Reg. Pref.	4th	
1975–76	4	Reg. Pref.	1st	
1976–77	3	3ª	12th	
1977–78	4	3ª	2nd	

Season	Tier	Division	Place	Copa del Rey
1978–79	4	3ª	8th	
1979–80	4	3ª	3rd	
1980–81	4	3ª	3rd	
1981–82	4	3ª	3rd	
1982–83	4	3ª	1st	
1983–84	3	2ª B	11th	
1984–85	3	2ª B	2nd	
1985–86	2	2ª	18th	
1986–87	3	2ª B	18th	
1987–88	3	2ª B	2nd	
1988–89	3	2ª B	16th	
1989–90	3	2ª B	8th	
1990–91	3	2ª B	5th	

- Merged with Zaragoza

Season	Tier	Division	Place
1991–92	3	2ª B	11th
1992–93	3	2ª B	18th
1993–94	4	3ª	2nd
1994–95	3	2ª B	18th
1995–96	4	3ª	1st
1996–97	3	2ª B	15th
1997–98	3	2ª B	6th
1998–99	3	2ª B	11th
1999–2000	3	2ª B	2nd
2000–01	3	2ª B	5th
2001–02	3	2ª B	3rd
2002–03	3	2ª B	13th
2003–04	3	2ª B	14th
2004–05	3	2ª B	5th
2005–06	3	2ª B	19th
2006–07	4	3ª	1st
2007–08	4	3ª	6th
2008–09	4	3ª	2nd
2009–10	4	3ª	3rd
2010–11	4	3ª	2nd

Season	Tier	Division	Place
2011–12	3	2ª B	16th
2012–13	3	2ª B	16th
2013–14	4	3ª	1st
2014–15	3	2ª B	20th
2015–16	4	3ª	1st
2016–17	4	3ª	1st
2017–18	3	2ª B	20th
2018–19	4	3ª	3rd
2019–20	4	3ª	4th
2020–21	4	3ª	4th / 3rd
2021–22	5	3ª RFEF	1st
2022–23	4	2ª Fed.	13th
2023–24	4	2ª Fed.	5th
2024–25	4	2ª Fed.	9th
2025–26	4	2ª Fed.	17th
2026–27	5	3ª Fed.	

- 1 season in Segunda División
- 24 seasons in Segunda División B
- 4 seasons in Segunda Federación
- 29 seasons in Tercera División
- 2 seasons in Tercera Federación/Tercera División RFEF

== Honours ==
- Tercera División: (6) 1982–83, 1995–96, 2006–07, 2013–14, 2015–16, 2016–17

== Current squad ==
As of 8 April 2026

Note: Flags indicate national team as defined under FIFA eligibility rules; some limited exceptions apply. Players may hold more than one non-FIFA nationality.

No.	Pos.	Nation	Player
1	GK	ESP	Carlos Calavia
2	DF	ESP	Jaime Sánchez
3	DF	ESP	Álex González
4	DF	ESP	Juan Carlos Sabater
5	DF	ESP	Hugo Barrachina
6	MF	ESP	Ángel Linares
7	FW	HON	Yoha Vásquez
8	MF	ESP	Lucas Terrer
9	FW	ESP	Hugo Goñi
10	FW	ESP	Hugo Pinilla
11	FW	ESP	Iker Vadillo
12	DF	ESP	Eloy Moreno
13	GK	ESP	Manuel Obón

No.	Pos.	Nation	Player
14	MF	ESP	Aimar Bonel
17	FW	ESP	Dani González
19	DF	MAR	Reda Ergouai
20	MF	ESP	Álvaro Palacio
21	MF	ESP	Iker García
22	DF	ESP	David García
23	MF	ESP	Jaime Tobajas
24	DF	URU	Enzo Facchin
25	GK	ESP	Sergio Berrar
27	FW	ESP	Jorge Franco
29	DF	ESP	Izan Muñoz
—	FW	ESP	Luis Carbonell

=== From Youth Academy ===
Note: Flags indicate national team as defined under FIFA eligibility rules; some limited exceptions apply. Players may hold more than one non-FIFA nationality.

No.	Pos.	Nation	Player
26	DF	ESP	Ale Gomes
30	FW	ESP	Samuel Herrero

No.	Pos.	Nation	Player
35	GK	ROU	Marcos Manolache

=== Current technical staff ===
Position	Staff
Head coach	(Spain) Emilio Larraz
Assistant coach	(Spain) Ángel Chamarro
Goalkeeping coach	(Spain) Joaquín Moso
Delegate	(Spain) Andrés Moltó
Physiotherapists	(Spain) David Lahoz
Fitness coach	(Spain) Miguel Lampre
Kit man	(Spain) Adrián Miranda

Last updated: 20 September 2022
Source: Deportivo Aragón (in Spanish)
