= SD Huesca =

Spanish professional football club

Huesca
- Full name: Sociedad Deportiva Huesca, S.A.D.
- Nicknames: Oscenses; Azulgranas; Los de la cruz de San Jorge
- Short name: HUE
- Founded: 29 March 1960; 66 years ago
- Stadium: Estadio El Alcoraz
- Capacity: 9,100
- Owner: Fundación Alcoraz
- President: Manuel Torres
- Head coach: Albert Rudé
- League: Primera Federación – Group 2
- 2025–26: Segunda División, 20th of 22 (relegated)
- Website: sdhuesca.es
Home colours	Away colours	Third colours

Sociedad Deportiva Huesca, S.A.D., is a Spanish football club based in Huesca, in the autonomous community of Aragon. Founded in 1960, the club competes in the Primera Federación, having played in the Spanish top division for the first time in the club's history in the 2018–19 season, followed by another single season in 2020–21. SD Huesca plays its home games at Estadio El Alcoraz, which seats 9,100 spectators.

== History ==
The city of Huesca is one of the pioneers in the introduction of football in Aragon. In the beginning of the 20th century (in 1903), the city already had a society named "Foot-ball Oscense".

Huesca Fútbol Club was founded in 1910 with Jorge Cajal as the first president. On 10 April 1910 the first formal match was played in the city of Huesca between the teams of the Sertorius Club, formed by high school students, and El Ideal de Magisterio Oscense. The match was organized by Huesca Sport Club.

In 1913, Huesca Sport Club became Huesca Fútbol Club. At this time other teams also emerged, among them Atlético Osca and the Stadium, which later merged with Huesca FC. The Stadium wore blue and red colors of Barcelona and the team acquired those colors for their T-shirts.

16 years later it folded – after it had joined the Royal Spanish Football Federation in 1922 (its department in the Aragon autonomous community in Spain - the Aragonese Football Federation, founded in 1922). But in 1929 reappeared as CD Huesca, being renamed Unión Deportiva in 1943, but the club again disappeared in 1956 due to financial problems. The first president after official registration of the Huesca Fútbol Club was Santos Solana. Lorenzo Lera was the first associate of the club, which was enrolled in the Federation with the blaugrana colours as its founding members were FC Barcelona supporters.

One of the first games of written reference was a local derby against Bosco FC, a 3–5 loss. In the mid-1920s the club turned professional and, in 1926, a match against FC Barcelona was played at the Villa Isabel, in a 2–2 draw. Following the serious incidents that occurred on 23 October 1927 in the match against Real Zaragoza in the Regional Championship, with a field invasion by fans due to lousy arbitration and consequent sanctions of the Regional Federation for three months, the club was withdrawn from the championship and passed its players to other teams. In early 1930s emerged the Huesca Sports Club (Club Deportivo Huesca) which won the Regional Fans Championship (Campeonato Regional de Aficionados) in the 1930–31 season, reaching the final of the National Championship, where lost to Ciosvín in the Estadio Chamartín in Madrid. During the Civil War, football was still played in Huesca and in 1939 the Huesca Fútbol Club instantly reappeared. From the 1943–44 season and after being renamed to Unión Deportiva Huesca the club played for seven consecutive seasons in Tercera División. In 1950, Huesca first reached Segunda División.

On 29 March 1960 Sociedad Deportiva Huesca evolved, first playing in Segunda División B in 1977. The 1960–61 season Huesca played in Regional category and achieved promotion to Tercera División, where remained for 12 consecutive seasons. Huesca were champions of their Tercera División group for two years running for the 1966-67 and 1967-68 seasons but were defeated in the playoff promotions each time.

In the 1972–73 season the club was relegated to Primera Regional, which is a regional level competition. But the next year it returned to Tercera División. The club headed Tercera División in the 1989–90 season and as a result was promoted to Segunda División B.

In the 2005–06 season, SD Huesca was relegated to Tercera División. In 2006 the club finished second in the Copa Federación de España, losing to Puertollano; in that same season it narrowly avoided relegation to Tercera División, after a play-off against Castillo.

In the 2006–07 campaign the club reached the play-offs for promotion to the second level, having lost a two-legged final against Córdoba CF. In the following season, it returned to the "silver category". It happened on 15 September 2008 after the win over Écjija in the promotion play-off.

2008–09's second division was a regular one for Huesca led by coach Antonio Calderón, with the new league status being maintained with many rounds left. Huesca finished that season in the 11th position. Rubén Castro, loaned by Deportivo La Coruña, was one of the most important players during the campaign, scoring 14 times, ninth-best in the league. In its second season in the Segunda División, the team struggled to remain there. Huesca finished in 13th position, just 2 points away from being relegated. The best scorer in the team that season was Juanjo Camacho, who scored 8 goals in the competition.

Chart of SD Huesca league performance 1929-present

In the 2010–11 season Huesca retained its place in the Segunda División finishing in the 14th position. The result was achieved by the good defensive performance. The goalkeeper Andrés Fernández was awarded with the Zamora Trophy for having the lowest "goals-to-games" ratio in the division.

Relegation followed at the end of the 2012–13 season, but the club returned to the Segunda División in 2015 after a first-place finish and eventually a two-leg play-off victory over Huracán Valencia.

After the 2016–17 season, Huesca qualified for the promotion play-offs to La Liga for the first time ever, but was eliminated in the semifinals by Getafe. The azulgranas managed to play 2-2 at home, but then lost 0-3 in the away game. In the 2017–18 season, Huesca was promoted to La Liga for the first time in their history after winning 2–0 against Lugo on 21 May 2018 at the Anxo Carro stadium. On 4 May 2019, Huesca was relegated back to the Segunda División after only one season in La Liga.

Huesca won promotion back to La Liga on 17 July 2020, after a 3–0 win over Numancia and secured the league title on the last matchday. On 22 May 2021, despite winning two of their last five fixtures of the 2020–21 season, the club was relegated back to the second tier once more after drawing 0–0 on the last matchday against Valencia, the same team who had beaten them 6–2 to cause their relegation two years earlier. A month later, the club had its first Spanish international, goalkeeper Álvaro Fernández, who stepped in along with his under-21 teammates after the senior squad became unavailable due to a COVID-19 case.

At 2025–26 season, Huesca were relegated to third division, bringing their 11 years in professional football between first and second division to an end.

== Season to season ==
Season	Tier	Division	Place	Copa del Rey
1960–61	4	1ª Reg.	1st	
1961–62	3	3ª	11th	
1962–63	3	3ª	2nd	
1963–64	3	3ª	4th	
1964–65	3	3ª	2nd	
1965–66	3	3ª	3rd	
1966–67	3	3ª	1st	
1967–68	3	3ª	1st	
1968–69	3	3ª	9th	
1969–70	3	3ª	5th	First round
1970–71	3	3ª	13th	Second round
1971–72	3	3ª	12th	Third round
1972–73	3	3ª	13th	First round
1973–74	4	Reg. Pref.	1st	
1974–75	3	3ª	16th	Third round
1975–76	3	3ª	2nd	First round
1976–77	3	3ª	8th	Second round
1977–78	3	2ª B	12th	Second round
1978–79	3	2ª B	13th	Second round
1979–80	3	2ª B	14th	First round

Season	Tier	Division	Place	Copa del Rey
1980–81	3	2ª B	17th	
1981–82	3	2ª B	16th	
1982–83	3	2ª B	12th	
1983–84	3	2ª B	19th	First round
1984–85	4	3ª	1st	
1985–86	4	3ª	2nd	First round
1986–87	4	3ª	7th	First round
1987–88	4	3ª	7th	
1988–89	4	3ª	4th	
1989–90	4	3ª	1st	
1990–91	3	2ª B	13th	Fourth round
1991–92	3	2ª B	18th	Third round
1992–93	4	3ª	1st	Second round
1993–94	4	3ª	1st	
1994–95	4	3ª	2nd	
1995–96	3	2ª B	15th	First round
1996–97	3	2ª B	16th	
1997–98	4	3ª	17th	
1998–99	4	3ª	5th	
1999–2000	4	3ª	2nd	

Season	Tier	Division	Place	Copa del Rey
2000–01	4	3ª	4th	
2001–02	3	2ª B	19th	
2002–03	4	3ª	2nd	
2003–04	4	3ª	4th	
2004–05	3	2ª B	10th	
2005–06	3	2ª B	16th	
2006–07	3	2ª B	2nd	
2007–08	3	2ª B	2nd	Second round
2008–09	2	2ª	11th	Second round
2009–10	2	2ª	13th	Third round
2010–11	2	2ª	14th	Third round
2011–12	2	2ª	13th	Third round
2012–13	2	2ª	21st	Third round
2013–14	3	2ª B	7th	Second round
2014–15	3	2ª B	1st	Round of 32
2015–16	2	2ª	12th	Round of 32
2016–17	2	2ª	6th	Round of 32
2017–18	2	2ª	2nd	Second round
2018–19	1	1ª	19th	Round of 32
2019–20	2	2ª	1st	Second round

Season	Tier	Division	Place	Copa del Rey
2020–21	1	1ª	18th	Second round
2021–22	2	2ª	13th	Second round
2022–23	2	2ª	15th	First round
2023–24	2	2ª	17th	Round of 32
2024–25	2	2ª	8th	Round of 32
2025–26	2	2ª	20th	Round of 32
2026–27	3	1ª Fed.		TBD

- 2 seasons in La Liga
- 14 seasons in Segunda División
- 1 seasons in Primera Federación
- 18 seasons in Segunda División B
- 30 seasons in Tercera División

== Honours ==
Segunda División

- Champions (1): 2019–20

== Stadium ==
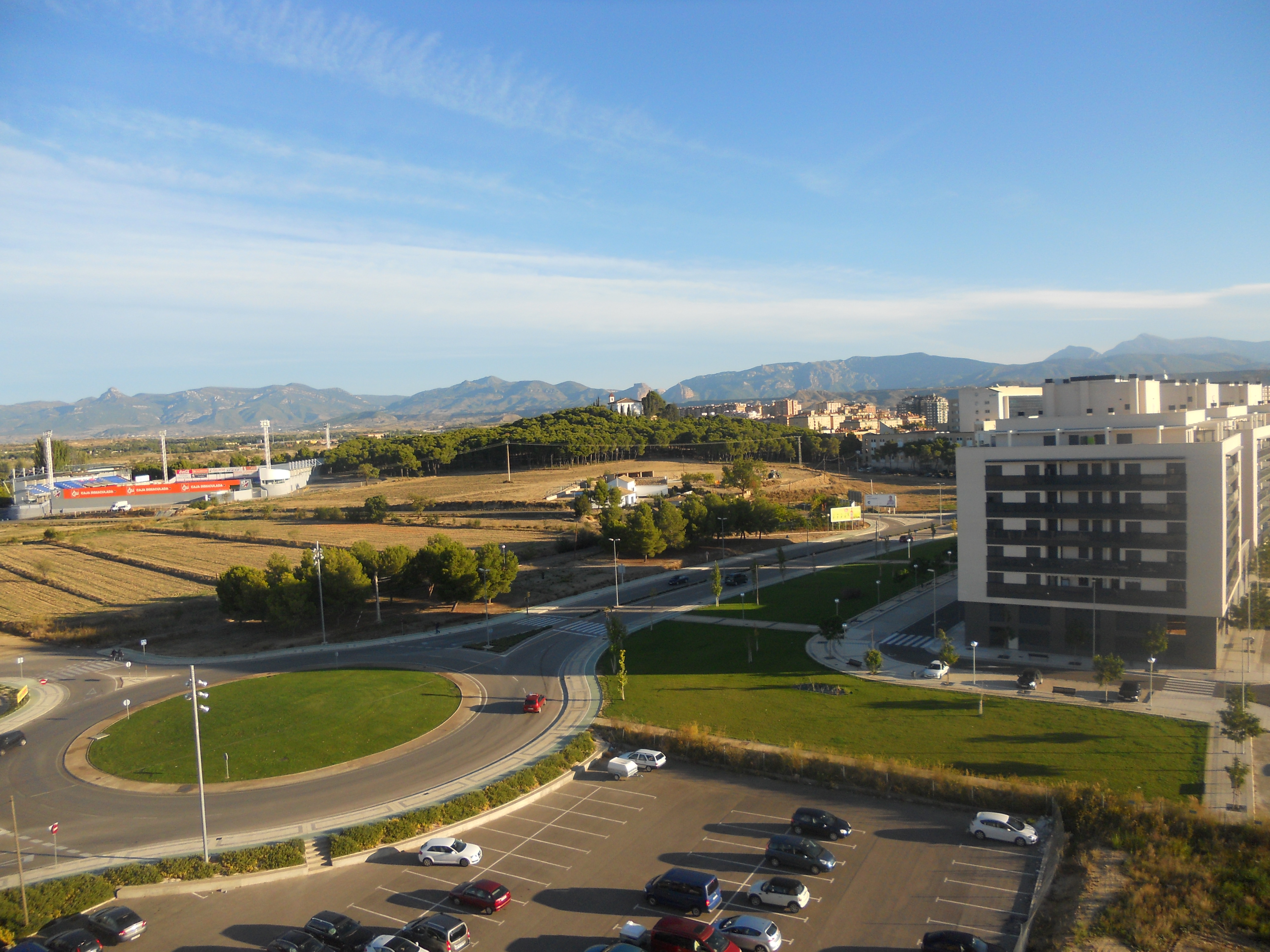
Outside view of El Alcoraz in the outskirts of Huesca

During the 1971–72 season Huesca decided to build a new football stadium, Estadio El Alcoraz, the team's third in its history, located in the hills of San Jorge with a capacity of 9,100 seats. The 1974 Amateur Cup of Spain final took place there.

=== Training facilities ===
- Name: Ciudad Deportiva San Jorge
- Size: 100 x 64 m.
- Grass: Artificial (since 2005)
- Address: Extension Ricardo del Arco, s / n. – Phone: 974 24 29 25

== Current squad ==
As of 12 October 2026

Note: Flags indicate national team as defined under FIFA eligibility rules; some limited exceptions apply. Players may hold more than one non-FIFA nationality.

No.	Pos.	Nation	Player
1	GK	ARG	Gianfranco Gazzaniga
2	DF	CMR	Mohammed Djetei
3	DF	AND	Iván Rodríguez (on loan from Andorra)
4	DF	FRA	Yann Kembo (on loan from Sporting Gijón)
5	DF	ESP	Quique Fornos
6	MF	ESP	Jimmy Suárez
7	FW	ESP	Rafa Tresaco
8	FW	BRA	Douglas Aurélio (on loan from Castellón)
9	FW	ESP	Sergi Enrich
10	MF	ESP	Pascu
11	MF	ESP	Luismi Redondo
13	GK	ARG	Álvaro Killane

No.	Pos.	Nation	Player
14	MF	ESP	Mario García
15	DF	ESP	Guillem Molina
16	DF	ESP	Salva Ruiz
17	FW	ESP	Diego Collado
18	FW	ARG	Agustín Juárez
19	FW	ESP	Cristian Herrera
20	DF	ESP	Marc Aznar
21	FW	ESP	Diego Gómez (on loan from Deportivo A Coruña)
22	MF	ESP	Ander Gorostidi
23	MF	ESP	Óscar Sielva
24	DF	VEN	Víctor García
—	FW	ESP	Diego Aznar

=== Reserve team ===
Note: Flags indicate national team as defined under FIFA eligibility rules; some limited exceptions apply. Players may hold more than one non-FIFA nationality.

No.	Pos.	Nation	Player
26	DF	ESP	Álex Calvo
27	DF	ESP	Miguel Perales
29	MF	ESP	Diego Hernández

No.	Pos.	Nation	Player
30	GK	ESP	Nico Azagra
31	FW	ESP	Pablo Osán
40	GK	ESP	Javier Abbad

=== Out on loan ===
Note: Flags indicate national team as defined under FIFA eligibility rules; some limited exceptions apply. Players may hold more than one non-FIFA nationality.

No.	Pos.	Nation	Player
—	MF	ESP	Jaime Escario (at Ebro until 30 June 2027)
—	FW	ESP	Sergi Armero (at Sant Andreu until 30 June 2027)

== Club officials ==
=== Current technical staff ===
Position	Staff
Head coach	(Spain) Albert Rudé
Assistant coach	(Spain) Dani Soler
Fitness coach	(Spain) Pello Alkain (Spain) Carlos Calvo
Goalkeeping coach	(Spain) Adrián Mallén
Analyst	(Spain) Adrián Sipán
Rehab fitness coach	(Spain) Pedro Barrio
Material managers	(Spain) Alveiro Bastidas (Spain) Samuel Sánchez
Delegate	(Spain) Lluís Sastre
Doctor	(Spain) Juan Carlos Galindo
Physiotherapist	(Spain) David Martínez (Spain) Miguel Ángel Ortiz (Spain) Ángel Lana
Nutritionist	(Spain) Jorge Cofrades

Last updated: 17 August 2025
Source: SD Huesca (in Spanish)

=== Board of directors ===
Office	Name
President	Agustín Lasaosa
Secretary	Pedro Ibaibarriaga
Directors	José Abarca
Directors	Sergio Alfonso
Directors	Carmelo Bosque
Directors	Sergio Gracia
Directors	José Antonio Martín
Directors	Agustín Pueyo
Directors	Manuel Torres
General director	Jose Luis Ortas
Documentation secretary	Maite Franco
Projects and resources department	Luis Sanclemente
Sporting director	Emilio Vega
Academy director	Ramón Tejada
Women's team director	Azucena Garanto
Medical director	Juan Carlos Galindo
Infrastructure and production director	Luis Sanclemente
Financial director	Carlos Laguna
Marketing and commercial director	Daniel Oliván
Operations and services director	Agustín Pueyo
Communication director	Jara Echeverría
Digital development director	Azucena Garant

Last updated: 9 April 2019
Source: SD Huesca

== Coaches ==
- (Spain) José Luis García Traid (1969–70)
- (Spain) Luis Costa (1977–78), (1982)
- (Spain) Manolo Villanova (1991–92)
- (Spain) Juanjo Díaz (1995–96)
- (Spain) Manuel García Calderón (1996–97)
- (Spain) Ismael Díaz (2002)
- (Spain) Fabri (2004)
- (Spain) Juan Antonio Anquela (2005)
- (Spain) Miguel Ángel Sola (2005–06)
- (Spain) Manolo Villanova (2006–08)
- (Spain) Enrique Llena (2007–08)
- (Spain) Onésimo Sánchez (2008)
- (Spain) Antonio Calderón (2008–10)
- (Spain) Onésimo Sánchez (2010–11)
- (Spain) Ángel Royo (2011)
- (Spain) Quique Hernández (2011–12)
- (Spain) Fabri (2012)
- (Spain) Ángel Royo (interim) (2012)
- (Spain) Antonio Calderón (2012–13)
- (Argentina) Jorge D'Alessandro (2013)
- (Spain) Pablo Alfaro (2013)
- (Spain) David Amaral (2013–14)
- (Spain) Luis Tevenet (2014–15)
- (Spain) Juan Antonio Anquela (2015–17)
- (Spain) Rubi (2017–18)
- (Argentina) Leo Franco (2018)
- (Spain) Francisco (2018–19)
- (Spain) Míchel (2019–21)
- (Spain) Pacheta (2021)
- (Mexico) Ignacio Ambríz (2021)
- (Spain) Xisco Muñoz (2021–22)
- (Spain) José Ángel Ziganda (2022–23)

== See also ==
- AD Almudévar
- CD Teruel
- SD Ejea
- SD Huesca B
- Aragonese derby
