= Real Zaragoza =

Association football club in Spain

- Full name: Real Zaragoza, S.A.D.
- Nicknames: Los Maños (The Aragonese); Los Blanquillos
- Founded: 18 March 1932; 94 years ago as Zaragoza Foot-ball Club
- Stadium: Ibercaja Stadium
- Capacity: 20,000
- Owner: A.Gain Capital
- President: Jorge Mas
- Head coach: Ibai Gómez
- League: Primera Federación – Group 2
- 2025–26: Segunda División, 22nd of 22 (relegated)
- Website: realzaragoza.com
Home colours	Away colours

Real Zaragoza, S.A.D. (Spanish pronunciation: [reˈal θaɾaˈɣoθa]), commonly referred to as Zaragoza, is a football club based in Zaragoza, Aragon, Spain, that currently competes in the Primera Federación – Group 2, holding its home games at La Romareda.

Founded on 18 March 1932, the club has spent the majority of its history in La Liga, although they have not played at that level since they were last relegated in 2013. They have won the Copa del Rey six times, 1963–64 Inter-Cities Fairs Cup and the 1994–95 UEFA Cup Winners' Cup, amongst other trophies. Traditionally, their team colours are white shirts and socks with royal blue shorts.

A government survey in 2007 found that 2.7% of the Spanish population support Real Zaragoza, making them the seventh-most supported in the country.

The club's main rivals are: Huesca, their opponents in the Aragonese derby; Numancia, from the nearby Province of Soria; and Osasuna, the largest club in the neighbouring Navarre region.

== History ==
=== Early years ===
Real Zaragoza was originally formed from two rival teams: Iberia SC and Real Zaragoza CD. In 1939, after three years without football due to the Spanish Civil War, the team made its first appearance in La Liga, ending in 7th position out of 12 teams, but being relegated in 1941. The club returned to the top division one year later, only to be immediately relegated back. It remained in Segunda División until the end of the 1950–51 campaign, when it achieved promotion by finishing second in a play-off league.

On 8 September 1957, the team left its original stadium, El Torrero, for its current stadium, La Romareda.

=== The golden era ===
Beginning in the 1960–61 season, Zaragoza enjoyed a period of great success, showcasing some of the greatest players playing in Spain during that decade, which earned for themselves the designation of Los Magníficos. While the team failed to capture the league title, it finished in the top five every year until 1968–69, with two third-place finishes, and also won its first two Copa del Rey titles and the 1963–64 Inter-Cities Fairs Cup.

Zaragoza's famous attacking line included Canário, Carlos Lapetra, Marcelino, Eleuterio Santos and Juan Manuel Villa. The Peruvian Juan Seminario, who started his career in Spain with Los Maños before moving to Barcelona, won the Pichichi Trophy in the 1961–62 campaign, scoring 25 goals in 30 matches as Zaragoza finished in fourth position.

=== 1970s to the end of the century ===
The starting XI in the 1995 Cup Winners' Cup final

Zaragoza finished third in 1973–74 and a best-ever second in the following season, losing the title in the last round to Real Madrid. The club was also defeated 0–1 in the 1976 domestic cup final against Atlético Madrid, spending two seasons in the second level during the decade, with promotion at the first attempt on either occasion.

In 1986, Zaragoza won its third Copa del Rey, defeating Barcelona 1–0. The club finished the 1990–91 season in 17th position, thus having to appear in the promotion/relegation play-offs against Real Murcia; on 19 June 1991, after a 0–0 away draw, a 5–2 home win meant the team managed to maintain its top level status.

Víctor Fernández was appointed manager in 1991. On 10 May 1995, one year after winning the Copa del Rey against Celta, Zaragoza won the UEFA Cup Winners' Cup against Arsenal at the Parc des Princes, Paris, after having disposed of the likes of Feyenoord and Chelsea en route. With the score level at 1–1, the two teams entered extra time and, in the 120th minute, Nayim hit a half-volley from just past the halfway line, putting it beyond the reach of goalkeeper David Seaman for the final 2–1. The club then contested the 1995 UEFA Super Cup against Ajax, losing 1–5 on aggregate despite a home draw in the first leg. Víctor Fernández was dismissed from his post in early November 1996, after only winning one league match that season.

=== The 21st century ===
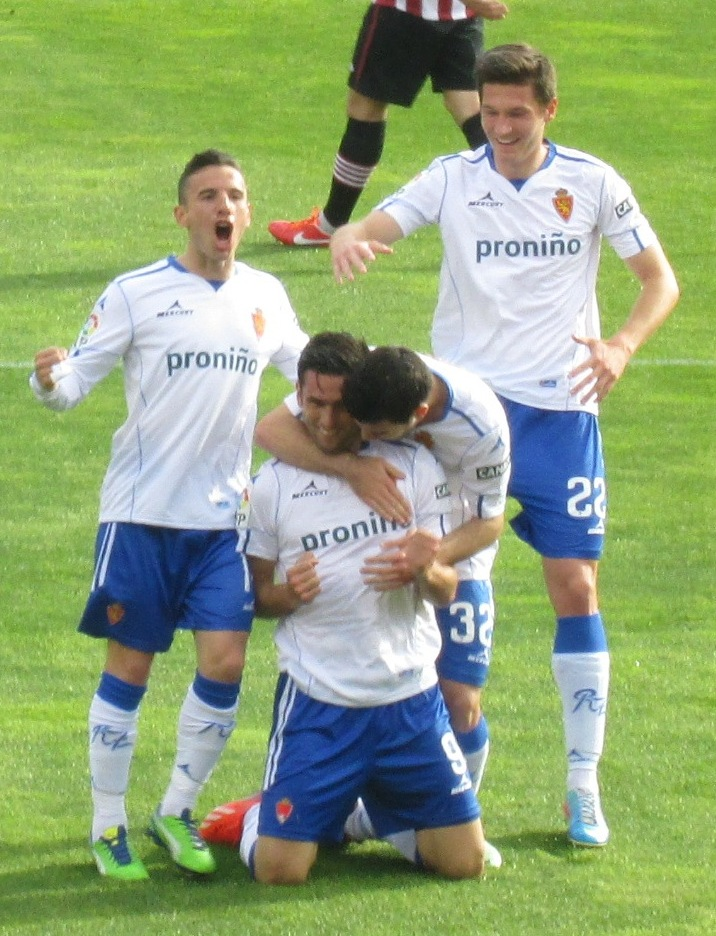
Players celebrate a goal by Hélder Postiga during the 2012–13 season.

Chart of Real Zaragoza league performance 1929–present

The 2000s brought a further two Copa del Rey titles to Zaragoza's trophy cabinet, including the 2003–04 edition against Real Madrid in Barcelona (3–2 after extra time). However, the club also suffered top flight relegation in 2002 after narrowly avoiding so the previous season, but achieved immediate promotion in 2003. In late May 2006, Agapito Iglesias purchased Alfonso Solans' shares and took control of the club, promising to build one of the strongest teams in Spain and Europe. In his first year in charge, he purchased Pablo Aimar from Valencia for €11 million, and former manager Víctor Fernández also returned to the club.

Mainly due to Diego Milito's 23 goals in 2006–07 (he finished third to Roma's Francesco Totti and Real Madrid's Ruud van Nistelrooy – 26 and 25 goals, respectively – in the European Golden Shoe race), Real Zaragoza finished in sixth position, thus qualifying to the UEFA Cup. However, the following season ended in relegation (18th position among 20 teams with only 10 wins in 38 matches, among them only 1 away win in 19 games) – for the second time in the decade – with the side also being eliminated in the first round in European competition. Legendary club coach Víctor Fernández returned for a second spell, although he was sacked in January 2008, as the club had four managers during the campaign. On the last matchday, a brace from Ricardo Oliveira proved insufficient in a 2–3 away loss against Mallorca, with the team totalling 42 points to Osasuna's 43.

Zaragoza achieved promotion from the second division at the first attempt. On the last matchday, on 20 June 2009, the team drew 2–2 at Rayo Vallecano with goals from youth graduate David Generelo and ex-Real Madrid defender Francisco Pavón, only trailing champions Xerez in the table. Nevertheless, that season Zaragoza was the best team at home, gained 50 from their 81 points in home games. However, after four seasons mainly spent in the bottom half of the table, Zaragoza was relegated following the 2012–13 Liga season after finishing last.

In April 2022, the purchase of 51% of the shares of the SAD by an international investment fund led by Jorge Mas was disclosed. In 2025–26 season, Zaragoza were relegated to the third division for the first time since 1949.

== Seasons ==
=== Season to season ===
Season	Tier	Division	Place	Copa del Rey
1932–33	3	3ª	1st	Round of 16
1933–34	3	3ª	1st	Round of 16
1934–35	2	2ª	3rd	Quarter-finals
1935–36	2	2ª	2nd	Quarter-finals
1939–40	1	1ª	7th	Semi-finals
1940–41	1	1ª	11th	Third round
1941–42	2	2ª	2nd	Round of 16
1942–43	1	1ª	13th	Round of 16
1943–44	2	2ª	6th	Round of 32
1944–45	2	2ª	7th	First round
1945–46	2	2ª	10th	First round
1946–47	2	2ª	13th	First round
1947–48	3	3ª	3rd	Third round
1948–49	3	3ª	2nd	First round
1949–50	2	2ª	4th	Second round
1950–51	2	2ª	2nd	Did Not Play
1951–52	1	1ª	12th	Quarter-finals
1952–53	1	1ª	16th	DNP
1953–54	2	2ª	9th	DNP
1954–55	2	2ª	3rd	DNP

Season	Tier	Division	Place	Copa del Rey
1955–56	2	2ª	3rd	DNP
1956–57	1	1ª	9th	Round of 16
1957–58	1	1ª	14th	Round of 16
1958–59	1	1ª	9th	Round of 16
1959–60	1	1ª	11th	Round of 32
1960–61	1	1ª	3rd	Round of 16
1961–62	1	1ª	4th	Semi-finals
1962–63	1	1ª	5th	Runner-up
1963–64	1	1ª	4th	Winner
1964–65	1	1ª	3rd	Runner-up
1965–66	1	1ª	4th	Winner
1966–67	1	1ª	5th	Round of 32
1967–68	1	1ª	5th	Quarter-finals
1968–69	1	1ª	13th	Round of 16
1969–70	1	1ª	8th	Semi-finals
1970–71	1	1ª	16th	Round of 16
1971–72	2	2ª	3rd	Fourth round
1972–73	1	1ª	8th	Fifth round
1973–74	1	1ª	3rd	Quarter-finals
1974–75	1	1ª	2nd	Semi-finals

Season	Tier	Division	Place	Copa del Rey
1975–76	1	1ª	14th	Runner-up
1976–77	1	1ª	16th	Quarter-finals
1977–78	2	2ª	1st	Round of 16
1978–79	1	1ª	14th	Quarter-finals
1979–80	1	1ª	10th	Fourth round
1980–81	1	1ª	14th	First round
1981–82	1	1ª	11th	Quarter-finals
1982–83	1	1ª	6th	Second round
1983–84	1	1ª	7th	Third round
1984–85	1	1ª	10th	Semi-finals
1985–86	1	1ª	4th	Winner
1986–87	1	1ª	5th	Round of 16
1987–88	1	1ª	11th	Round of 32
1988–89	1	1ª	5th	Round of 32
1989–90	1	1ª	9th	Quarter-finals
1990–91	1	1ª	17th	Round of 16
1991–92	1	1ª	6th	Fifth round
1992–93	1	1ª	9th	Runner-up
1993–94	1	1ª	3rd	Winner
1994–95	1	1ª	7th	Round of 16

Season	Tier	Division	Place	Copa del Rey
1995–96	1	1ª	13th	Quarter-finals
1996–97	1	1ª	14th	Third round
1997–98	1	1ª	13th	Semi-finals
1998–99	1	1ª	9th	Third round
1999–2000	1	1ª	4th	Round of 16
2000–01	1	1ª	17th	Winner
2001–02	1	1ª	20th	Round of 64
2002–03	2	2ª	2nd	Round of 32
2003–04	1	1ª	12th	Winner
2004–05	1	1ª	12th	Round of 64
2005–06	1	1ª	11th	Runner-up
2006–07	1	1ª	6th	Quarter-finals
2007–08	1	1ª	18th	Round of 16
2008–09	2	2ª	2nd	Second round
2009–10	1	1ª	14th	Round of 32
2010–11	1	1ª	13th	Round of 32
2011–12	1	1ª	16th	Round of 32
2012–13	1	1ª	20th	Quarter-finals
2013–14	2	2ª	14th	Second round
2014–15	2	2ª	6th	Second round

Season	Tier	Division	Place	Copa del Rey
2015–16	2	2ª	8th	Third round
2016–17	2	2ª	16th	Second round
2017–18	2	2ª	3rd	Round of 32
2018–19	2	2ª	15th	Third round
2019–20	2	2ª	3rd	Round of 16
2020–21	2	2ª	15th	Second round
2021–22	2	2ª	10th	Round of 32
2022–23	2	2ª	13th	First round
2023–24	2	2ª	15th	First round
2024–25	2	2ª	18th	Second round
2025–26	2	2ª	22nd	Second round
2026–27	3	1ª Fed.		TBD

- 58 seasons in La Liga
- 29 seasons in Segunda División
- 1 season in Primera Federación
- 4 seasons in Tercera División

== Current squad ==
As of 1 September 2026

Note: Flags indicate national team as defined under FIFA eligibility rules; some limited exceptions apply. Players may hold more than one non-FIFA nationality.

No.	Pos.	Nation	Player
1	GK	NED	Sem Westerveld
2	DF	ESP	Jokin Gabilondo
3	DF	ESP	Raúl Pereira
4	DF	ESP	Hugo Barrachina
5	DF	ESP	Tachi
6	MF	NGR	Peter Ademo
7	FW	ESP	Marcos Cuenca
8	MF	ESP	Ander Herrera
9	FW	ESP	Pau Sans
10	FW	ESP	Hugo Pinilla
11	FW	ESP	Jaume Jardí
13	GK	ESP	Anartz Peña

No.	Pos.	Nation	Player
14	DF	ESP	Rubén Iranzo
15	MF	GHA	Yussif Saidu
16	MF	ESP	Lucas Terrer
17	FW	ESP	Iker Vadillo
18	DF	ESP	Sergio Escudero
19	MF	ESP	Rubén Díez
20	FW	ESP	Joaquín Delgado
21	DF	ESP	Diego González
22	FW	ESP	Edu Espiau
23	FW	DOM	Óscar Ureña
25	DF	ESP	Marco Sangalli

=== Reserve team ===
Note: Flags indicate national team as defined under FIFA eligibility rules; some limited exceptions apply. Players may hold more than one non-FIFA nationality.

No.	Pos.	Nation	Player
26	MF	ECU	Diego Monzón
27	MF	ESP	Sergio Beltrán
28	DF	ESP	Lalo Arantegui
30	FW	ESP	Laken Torres

No.	Pos.	Nation	Player
31	MF	ESP	Jaime Tobajas
32	DF	ESP	Ignacio Vázquez
40	GK	ROU	Marcos Manolache

=== Out on loan ===
Note: Flags indicate national team as defined under FIFA eligibility rules; some limited exceptions apply. Players may hold more than one non-FIFA nationality.

No.	Pos.	Nation	Player
—	DF	SVK	Sebastian Kóša (at Košice until 30 June 2027)
—	DF	ESP	Hugo Carrillo (at Mérida until 30 June 2027)

No.	Pos.	Nation	Player
—	MF	ESP	Iker García (at Arenas Getxo until 30 June 2027)
—	FW	ESP	Adrián Liso (at Mallorca until 30 June 2027)

=== Current technical staff ===
Position	Staff
Head coach	(Spain) Rubén Sellés
Assistant coach	(Spain) Toni Astorgano
Technical assistant coach	(Spain) Mikel Marcos
Goalkeeping coach	(Spain) Joaquín Moso
Fitness coaches	(Spain) Pablo Quílez (Spain) Daniel Castro (Spain) Miguel Lampre
Delegate	(Spain) Alberto Belsué
Field delegate	(Spain) Paco Navea
Doctors	(Spain) Adrian Iepure (Spain) Luis G. Melchor
Rehab fitness coaches	(Spain) Andrés Ubieto (Spain) Oscar Caro
Physiotherapists	(Spain) Iván Villanúa (Spain) Jorge Pellicena (Spain) Eduardo Alastrué (Spain) David Lahoz
Equipment managers	(Spain) Antonio Hernández (Spain) Raúl Del Pino
Podiatrist	(Spain) Carlos Martín
Nutritionist	(Spain) Raúl Luzón
Sports psychologist	(Spain) Jesús Cabrero

Last updated: 14 August 2025
Source: Real Zaragoza (in Spanish)

== Honours ==
=== League ===
- Segunda División
  - Winners: 1977–78

=== Cups ===
- Copa del Rey
  - Winners: 1963–64, 1965–66, 1985–86, 1993–94, 2000–01, 2003–04
- Supercopa de España
  - Winners: 2004

=== International ===
- UEFA Cup Winners' Cup
  - Winners: 1994–95
- Inter-Cities Fairs Cup
  - Winners: 1963–64

== Records ==
=== Club ===
- Best La Liga position: 2nd (1974–75)
- Worst La Liga position: 20th (2001–02)
- Overall La Liga historical classification: 9th
- Greatest home win: Real Zaragoza 8–1 Español (1978–79), Real Zaragoza 8–1 Sevilla (1987–88)
- Greatest away win: Elche 2–7 Real Zaragoza (1960–61)
- Greatest home defeat: Real Zaragoza 1–7 Real Madrid (1987–88)
- Greatest away defeat: Athletic Bilbao 10–1 Real Zaragoza (1951–52)

=== Player ===
- Most matches: Xavier Aguado (473)
- Most minutes: Xavier Aguado (33,480)
- Most goals all-time: Marcelino (117)
- Most goals in one season: Ewerthon (28, 2008–09)
- Foreign player with most appearances: Gustavo Poyet (239)
- Red cards: Xavier Aguado (18)

== Notable players ==
Note: this list includes players that have appeared in at least 100 league games, have reached international status, or both.

- (Argentina) Pablo Aimar
- (Argentina) Andrés D'Alessandro
- (Argentina) Roberto Ayala
- (Argentina) Juan Barbas
- (Argentina) Sergio Berti
- (Argentina) Fernando Cáceres
- (Argentina) Juan Pablo Carrizo
- (Argentina) Juan Esnáider
- (Argentina) Darío Franco
- (Argentina) Leo Franco
- (Argentina) Luciano Galletti
- (Argentina) Kily González
- (Argentina) Gustavo López
- (Argentina) Diego Milito
- (Argentina) Gabriel Milito
- (Argentina) Daniel Montenegro
- (Argentina) Leonardo Ponzio
- (Argentina) Marcelo Trobbiani
- (Argentina) Jorge Valdano
- (Austria) Otto Konrad
- (Belarus) Sergei Gurenko
- (Brazil) Cafu
- (Brazil) Canário
- (Brazil) Ewerthon
- (Brazil) Paulo Jamelli
- (Brazil) Gustavo Nery
- (Brazil) Ricardo Oliveira
- (Brazil) Sávio
- (Bulgaria) Bozhidar Iskrenov
- (Bulgaria) Nasko Sirakov
- (Chile) Patricio Yáñez
- (Chile) Humberto Suazo
- (Colombia) Abel Aguilar
- (Colombia) Faryd Mondragón
- (Croatia) Marko Babić
- (Croatia) Mate Bilić
- (Croatia) Alen Peternac
- (Cuba) Mario Inchausti
- (Czech Republic) Jiří Jarošík
- (France) Florent Sinama Pongolle
- (Germany) Andreas Brehme
- (Hungary) Ádám Pintér
- (Ivory Coast) Romaric
- (Japan) Shinji Kagawa
- (Mexico) Pablo Barrera
- (Mexico) Efraín Juárez
- (Netherlands) Frank Rijkaard
- (Nigeria) Ikechukwu Uche
- (Paraguay) Roberto Acuña
- (Paraguay) Saturnino Arrúa
- (Paraguay) José Luis Chilavert
- (Paraguay) Carlos Diarte
- (Peru) Miguel Rebosio
- (Peru) Juan Seminario
- (Poland) Cezary Wilk
- (Portugal) Fábio Coentrão
- (Portugal) Fernando Meira
- (Portugal) Hélder Postiga
- (Portugal) Rui Jordão
- (Portugal) Rúben Micael
- (Romania) Constantin Gâlcă
- (Romania) Dorin Mateuț
- (Romania) Cristian Săpunaru
- (Russia) Vladislav Radimov
- (Serbia) Stefan Babović
- (Serbia) Savo Milošević
- (Serbia) Ivan Obradović
- (Serbia and Montenegro) Goran Drulić
- (Spain) Xavier Aguado
- (Spain) Santiago Aragón
- (Spain) Pablo Alfaro
- (Spain) Cani
- (Spain) Andoni Cedrún
- (Spain) César Sánchez
- (Spain) Gabi
- (Spain) Sergio García
- (Spain) Rafael García Cortés
- (Spain) Jesús García Sanjuán
- (Spain) Ander Herrera
- (Spain) Pedro Herrera
- (Spain) Francisco Higuera
- (Spain) Juanele
- (Spain) Juanito
- (Spain) Juanmi
- (Spain) Carlos Lapetra
- (Spain) Marcelino
- (Spain) Javi Moreno
- (Spain) Fernando Morientes
- (Spain) José María Movilla
- (Spain) Víctor Muñoz
- (Spain) Nayim
- (Spain) Óscar
- (Spain) Paco
- (Spain) Miguel Pardeza
- (Spain) Gerard Piqué
- (Spain) Salva
- (Spain) Eleuterio Santos
- (Spain) Juan Señor
- (Spain) Marcos Vales
- (Spain) David Villa
- (Spain) Juan Manuel Villa
- (Spain) José Luis Violeta
- (Spain) Juan Vizcaíno
- (Spain) Alberto Zapater
- (Spain) Alberto Belsué
- (Sweden) Gary Sundgren
- (Uruguay) Carlos Diogo
- (Uruguay) Gustavo Poyet
- (Uruguay) Rubén Sosa
- (Socialist Federal Republic of Yugoslavia) Radomir Antić
- (Socialist Federal Republic of Yugoslavia) Slobodan Komljenović
- (Socialist Federal Republic of Yugoslavia) Ivica Šurjak

== Coaches ==
Dates	Name
March 1932 – June 1932	(Spain) Elías Sauca
June 1932 – April 1934	(Portugal) Felipe dos Santos
April 1934 – July 1934	(Spain) Tomás Arnanz
July 1934 – June 1935	(Spain) Francisco González
July 1935 – March 1936	(Spain) José Planas
March 1936 – July 1939	(Spain) Manuel Olivares
Aug 1939 – July 1941	(Spain) Tomás Arnanz
July 1941 – Nov 1941	(Spain) Francisco Gamborena
Nov 1941	(Spain) Julio Uriarte / Julio Ostalé
Dec 1941 – June 1943	(Spain) Jacinto Quincoces
July 1943 – June 1945	(Spain) Patricio Caicedo
July 1945 – Dec 1945	(Spain) Tomás Arnanz
Dec 1945 – June 1946	(Spain) Juan Ruiz
July 1946 – June 1947	(Spain) Manuel Olivares
July 1947 – Jan 1948	(Spain) Antonio Sorribas
Jan 1948 – April 1948	(Spain) Enrique Soladrero
April 1948 – May 1948	(Italy) Antonio Macheda
July 1948 – Jan 1949	(Spain) Francisco Bru
Jan 1949 – June 1949	(Spain) Isaac Oceja
July 1949 – Feb 1950	(Spain) Juan Ruiz
Feb 1950 – June 1950	(Spain) José Planas
July 1950 – April 1951	(Spain) Luis Urquiri
April 1951 – Oct 1951	(Spain) Juan Ruiz
Oct 1951 – Oct 1952	(Hungary) Elemér Berkessy
Oct 1952	(Spain) José Luis Conde
Nov 1952–53	(Spain) Domingo Balmanya
1953–54	(Spain) Pedro Eguiluz
1954 – June 1956	(Spain) Mundo
July 1956 – Feb 1958	(Spain) Jacinto Quincoces
Feb 1958 – June 1958	(Spain) Casariego
July 1958 – Dec 1959	(Spain) Juan Otxoantezana
Dec 1959 – June 1960	(Spain) Mundo
June 1960	(Spain) Rosendo Hernández

Dates	Name
July 1960 – June 1963	(Spain) César Rodríguez
July 1963 – June 1964	(Spain) Antoni Ramallets
June 1964	(Spain) Luis Belló
July 1964 – June 1965	(Argentina) Roque Olsen
July 1965 – Feb 1966	(France) Luis Hon
Feb 1966 – June 1967	(Czechoslovakia) Ferdinand Daučík
June 1967	(Spain) Andrés Lerín
July 1967 – Nov 1968	(Argentina) Roque Olsen
Nov 1968 – June 1969	(Spain) César Rodríguez
July 1969 – June 1970	(Spain) Héctor Rial
July 1970 – Oct 1970	(Spain) Cheché Martín
Oct 1970 – Jan 71	(Spain) Domingo Balmanya
Jan 1971 – Jun e1971	(Spain) José Luis García Traid
July 1971 – Oct 1971	(Spain) Rosendo Hernández
Oct 1971	(Spain) Juan Jugo Larrauri
Oct 1971 – June 1972	(Spain) Rafael Iriondo
July 1972 – June 1976	(Spain) Carriega
July 1976 – June 1977	(France) Lucien Muller
July 1977 – June 1978	(Spain) Arsenio Iglesias
July 1978 – June 1979	(Socialist Federal Republic of Yugoslavia) Vujadin Boškov
June 1979 – March 1981	(Spain) Manolo Villanova
March 1981 – June 1984	(Netherlands) Leo Beenhakker
July 1984 – June 1985	(Italy) Enzo Ferrari
July 1985 – Dec 1987	(Spain) Luis Costa
Dec 1987 – June 1988	(Spain) Manolo Villanova
July 1988 – June 1990	(Socialist Federal Republic of Yugoslavia) Radomir Antić
July 1990 – March 1991	(Uruguay) Ildo Maneiro
March 1991 – Nov 1996	(Spain) Víctor Fernández
Nov 1996 – Jan 1997	(Uruguay) Víctor Espárrago
Jan 1997 – June 1998	(Spain) Luis Costa
July 1998 – June 2000	(Spain) Chechu Rojo
July 2000 – Oct 2000	(Spain) Juan Manuel Lillo
Oct 2000 – June 2001	(Spain) Luis Costa

Dates	Name
July 2001 – Jan 2002	(Spain) Chechu Rojo
Jan 2002 – March 2002	(Spain) Luis Costa
March 2002 – June 2002	(Spain) Marcos Alonso
June 2002 – Jan 2004	(Spain) Paco Flores
Jan 2004 – June 2006	(Spain) Víctor Muñoz
July 2006 – Jan 2008	(Spain) Víctor Fernández
Jan 2008	(Spain) Ander Garitano
Jan 2008 – March 2008	(Spain) Javier Irureta
March 2008 – June 2008	(Spain) Manolo Villanova
July 2008 – Dec 2009	(Spain) Marcelino
Dec 2009 – Nov 2010	(Spain) José Aurelio Gay
Nov 2010 – Dec 2011	(Mexico) Javier Aguirre
Jan 2012 – June 2013	(Spain) Manolo Jiménez
June 2013 – March 2014	(Spain) Paco Herrera
March 2014 – Nov 2014	(Spain) Víctor Muñoz
Nov 2014 – Dec 2015	(Serbia) Ranko Popović
Dec 2015 – June 2016	(Spain) Lluís Carreras
June 2016 – Oct 2016	(Spain) Luis Milla
Oct 2016 – March 2017	(Spain) Raül Agné
March 2017 – June 2017	(Spain) César Láinez
June 2017 – June 2018	(Spain) Natxo González
June 2018 – Oct 2018	(Spain) Imanol Idiakez
Oct 2018 – Dec 2018	(Spain) Lucas Alcaraz
Dec 2018 – Aug 2020	(Spain) Víctor Fernández
Aug 2020 – Nov 2020	(Spain) Rubén Baraja
Nov 2020 – Dec 2020	(Spain) Iván Martínez
Dec 2020 – May 2022	(Spain) Juan Ignacio Martínez
May 2022 – Nov 2022	(Spain) Juan Carlos Carcedo
Nov 2022 – Nov 2023	(Spain) Fran Escribá
Nov 2023 – March 2024	(Spain) Julio Velázquez
March 2024 – Dec 2024	(Spain) Víctor Fernández
Dec 2024 – March 2025	(Spain) Miguel Ángel Ramírez
March 2025 – Oct 2025	(Spain) Gabi Fernández
Oct 2025	(Spain) Emilio Larraz
Oct 2025 – March 2026	(Spain) Rubén Sellés
March 2026 –	(Spain) David Navarro

== See also ==
- List of football clubs in Spain
