= Ciriaco Cuesta =

Spanish footballer and manager

Personal information
- Full name: Ciriaco Cuesta Sanz
- Date of birth: 16 March 1907
- Place of birth: Sanchonuño, Segovia, Spain
- Date of death: Unknown
- Position: Forward

Senior career*
Years	Team	Apps	(Gls)
1928–1929	Deportivo de La Coruña		
1929–1932	Atlético Madrid		
1932–1933	Sporting de Gijón		
1934–1936	Atlético Madrid		
1939–1940	Imperio CF		

Managerial career
- 1941–1942: Imperio CF
- 1947–1949: Gimnástica Segoviana CF
- * Club domestic league appearances and goals

Ciriaco Cuesta Sanz (16 March 1907), also known by his nickname Cuestita, was a Spanish footballer who played as a forward for Atlético Madrid. He is considered by some as the most important Segovian player in history.

He later worked as a manager.

== Playing career ==
Ciriaco Cuesta was born in Sanchonuño, Segovia, on 16 March 1907, and he began his football career at Deportivo de La Coruña in 1928, at the age of 21. While there, he stood out as a great striker, so he was signed by Atlético Madrid in 1929, for whom he played in the inaugural La Liga season in 1929. In its December 1929 issue, the illustrated magazine Gran Vida dedicated its cover to the "football star" from Segovia, and defined him as an "admirable player, a master of possessing devilish mobility". Since his emergence into the first division, everything has been praise for Cuesta "despite his doll-like figure", and the press of the time in general agreed in warning that with his presence, Atlético's game had "more life, "more union, more danger for the enemy." Cuesta was also described as a player "with easy and quick dribbling in his actions and the ability to score goals".

At the end of the 1929–30 season, however, the club's permanence in the First Division was in serious danger, since they needed a win in the final matchday to avoid relegation against the already crowned league champions Athletic Bilbao, and although Cuesta netted twice in the first half, they ultimately lost 4–3 and were relegated to the Segunda División. He remained at Atlético for seven years until the outbreak of the Spanish Civil War in 1936, playing a total of 62 competitive matches, including 47 in the league and 15 in the Copa del Rey. By this alone, Cuesta is considered by some as the most important Segovian player in history.

After his professional journey, Cuesta returned to Segovia to receive a tribute on 31 May 1936, in a match between Gimnástico FC and Atlético in front of a large audience in the stands, which ended with a comfortable victory to Atlético (4–7) minimized in a second half because several red and white players change teams to balance the clash.

== Managerial career ==
After the Spanish Civil War ended in 1939, Cuesta played one season for Imperio CF, where he retired in 1940 and then made his debut as a coach later that same year. He also managed Gimnástica Segoviana CF between 1947 and 1949.
