= Imperio CF =

Imperio
- Full name: Imperio Club de Fútbol
- Nickname: Royals
- Founded: 1923
- Dissolved: 1947
- Ground: Campo Antonio López, Madrid, Spain
Home colours	Away colours

Imperio Club de Fútbol was a Spanish football club based in Madrid.

== History ==
Founded in 1923 under the name of Imperio Foot-Ball Club, the club changed its name to Imperio Club de Fútbol in 1940 due to the new language rules in all country.

After the Spanish Civil War ended in 1939, the Imperio CF reorganized and created a new board with the aim of competing in the Castilla Championship. The team's greatest achievement was competing in Spain's Segunda División for one season in 1939–40 season, under coach José Quirante, and with the likes of Ramón Colón, Antonio Muñoz, and Cuestita, which ended in relegation. Imperio's members, aware of the delicate nature of the moment and in need of financial aid, know how to move quickly and skillfully, establishing contacts with the recently merged Athletic-Aviación Club, the future Atlético Madrid. Seeing the potential resources that this club has, Ángel Lehoz, Luis Mesa, Ventura Miguel, and Gregorio Lázaro arrange a meeting with the Atlético's Manuel Gallego, and Juan Touzón, and Imperio FC is declared a colchonero subsidiary with Ángel Lehoz as president.

In 1943 the club achieved promotion to Tercera División, but folded after four years. In its first season in the Third Division in 1943–44, Imperio, then coached by Luis Urquiri, participated for the first time in the 1944 Copa del Generalísimo, beating CD Toledo (9–0), RSD Alcalá (1–2), and CD Acero in the previous qualifying rounds to be eliminated by Albacete Balompié in fifth round (1–4 on aggregate).

== Season to season ==
Season	Tier	Division	Place	Copa del Rey
1923–1939	—	Regional	—	
1939–40	2	2ª	4th	
1940–41	4	1ª Reg.	5th	
1941–42	4	1ª Reg.	1st	
1942–43	4	1ª Reg.	2nd	
1943–44	3	3ª	5th	
1944–45	3	3ª	9th	
1945–46	3	3ª	2nd	
1946–47	3	3ª	10th	

- 1 season in Segunda División
- 4 seasons in Tercera División
