= Manuel Gallego =

Spanish soldier and sports leader (1894 – 1965)

15th president of Atlético Madrid
- In office 1941–1945
- Preceded by: Luis Navarro
- Succeeded by: Juan Touzón

Personal details
- Born: Manuel Gallego Suárez-Somonte; 22 June 1894 Mérida, Badajoz, Spain
- Died: 24 December 1965 (aged 71) Madrid, Spain
- Citizenship: Spanish
- Occupation: Soldier; Sports leader; aviators

Manuel Gallego Suárez-Somonte (22 June 1894 – 24 December 1965) was a Spanish soldier, lieutenant general of the Air Force, and the 15th president of Atlético Madrid between 1941 and 1945. Under his leadership the team won its second league title, returned to the Metropolitano and the club grew both economically and financially.

== Military career ==
=== Early career ===
Manuel Gallego was born on 22 June 1894 in the Badajoz town of Mérida, later settling in the capital of Spain, where in 1914, at the age of 20, he entered in the Toledo Infantry Academy as a student, and in 1917 he graduated as a 2nd lieutenant and was assigned to the 52nd Infantry Regiment. In 1919 he was assigned to the Arapiles Hunters Battalion No. 9 and later that year, he was promoted to lieutenant. On 23 September, he was assigned to the Group of Regular Indigenous Forces of Ceuta No. 3, participating in different war actions.

In December 1921, his connection with the aeronautical world began at the Cuatro Vientos aerodrome when he entered the airplane observer course as a student. In 1922, Gallego went to Africa as a volunteer, being part of the 1st Breguet XIV Squadron. On 26 April, in a bombing action, his aircraft was hit by rifle shots and he had to land in bad conditions where he was injured. In July he was assigned to the Melilla hydroplane base and later volunteered in the land squadron, combining his services between the hydroplane squadron and the 1st Rolls Squadron. In August he was called upon to take the airplane pilot course, participating in the following weeks in different war actions such as bombings and photographic observation.

=== Continuous promotions ===
On 22 July 1922, Gallego obtained the title of airplane observer. In January 1923, the Military Medal was awarded to the Rolls Group of which he was part. On 6 June 1923, he went to Getafe to attend the airplane pilot course, completing his 2nd category pilot tests on 25 August and being thus awarded the airplane pilot title of the International Aeronautical Federation with the number 365 card. In September of that year, he obtained the 1st category after passing the appropriate tests. In April 1924 he joined the Breguet XIV Squadron Group in Melilla under the command of Commander Gallarza. On 19 September, he was attached to the 1st Bristol Squadron commanded by Captain Fuentes, marching to Tetuán.

In July 1926, Gallego was classified on the Aviation Service scale with the category of Squadron Leader. After the Morocco Campaign he went through various destinations, such as in the Military Aviation Service until the end of February 1931; in the Military Aviation Material and Instruction Services until the end of December 1931; in the Aviation Headquarters until the end of August 1934, and in the Aviation Weapon Instruction and Material Services until July 1936.

=== Civil War ===
Gallego was in Madrid when the Spanish Civil War broke out in 1936, and having been caught by surprise, Gallego, in order to save his life, took refuge in the French embassy until 22 June 1937, from where he left disguised and with false documentation, towards the French country, later joining to the national side on the 27th of the same month.

In July 1937 and by order of the Air Command, Gallego was assigned to the El Copero airfield to carry out aeronautical retraining, and in August he was granted the job of Infantry Commander. Until the end of the year, he was ordered to attend a flight course without visibility and at night, carried out night bombing services, and was assigned to several positions of responsibility in the aerodromes of Olmedo, Zaragoza, and León. Throughout 1938, Gallego carried out war services with the León unit under his command on different battle fronts. He continued flying in war actions until he joined his post as Automobile Inspector in the 6th Section of the Spanish Air Force, holding this position until the end of the war. Gallego ended the campaign with 269 war services, including 103 with strong enemy anti-aircraft attacks.

=== Later career ===
In 1940, with the rank of Commander, he was appointed Governor of the Air Ministry. In February he was discharged from the Infantry Arm and then from the Air Force at the beginning of March. On 11 November 1940, he was promoted to Lieutenant Colonel of the air rank, being assigned in April 1941 as head of the 2nd section of the Spanish Air Force. Later and throughout his professional career he would reach the ranks of Brigadier General in 1947, Division General in 1954, and Lieutenant General in 1958.

As an observer and later as an airplane pilot, Gallego earned a large number of other decorations both for valor and for the time of operations spent in Morocco, among which two María Cristina Crosses. During the Asturias campaign, he was awarded the collective Military Medal awarded to the Aviation Squadron No. 1. In the Civil War and despite being hidden for a year in the French embassy, once he joined the national side as a pilot, he continued to earn decorations, but the post-war period was perhaps the most successful in terms of medals and crosses, mostly of foreign origin.

== Sporting career ==
On 14 September 1939, when the merger between Atlético Madrid and Club Aviación Nacional was completed, Gallego joined as a director of the club, known from that moment on, until December 1946, as Atlético Aviación.

On 1 March 1941, the then Aviación president Luis Navarro was sent to Rome as a military attaché at the Spanish Embassy, so Gallego, who then held the position of lieutenant colonel, was appointed as the 15th president of Atlético Madrid, then known as Atlético Aviación, becoming the fourth military man to do so after José Maria Fernández, Francisco Vives, and Navarro. Under his leadership, the club, still coached by Ricardo Zamora, won its second league title in 1940–41, returned to the Metropolitano, and the club grew both economically and financially.

On 27 December 1945, upon being appointed head of the Moroccan Air Zone, he presented his resignation as president, being replaced a few days later by Juan Touzón. In addition to the Moroccan Air Zone, he was also the head of the Levante Air Region. As the head of the later, Gallego promoted the idea of the "50th Gran Trofeo Valencia", a regatta between the boats of the Snipe class on the occasion of the 50th anniversary of the Real Club Náutico de Valencia in 1953.

== Death ==
Galíndez died in Madrid on the Christmas Eve of 1965, at the age of 71, a year after retiring with the rank of lieutenant general.
