= List of Atlético Madrid presidents =

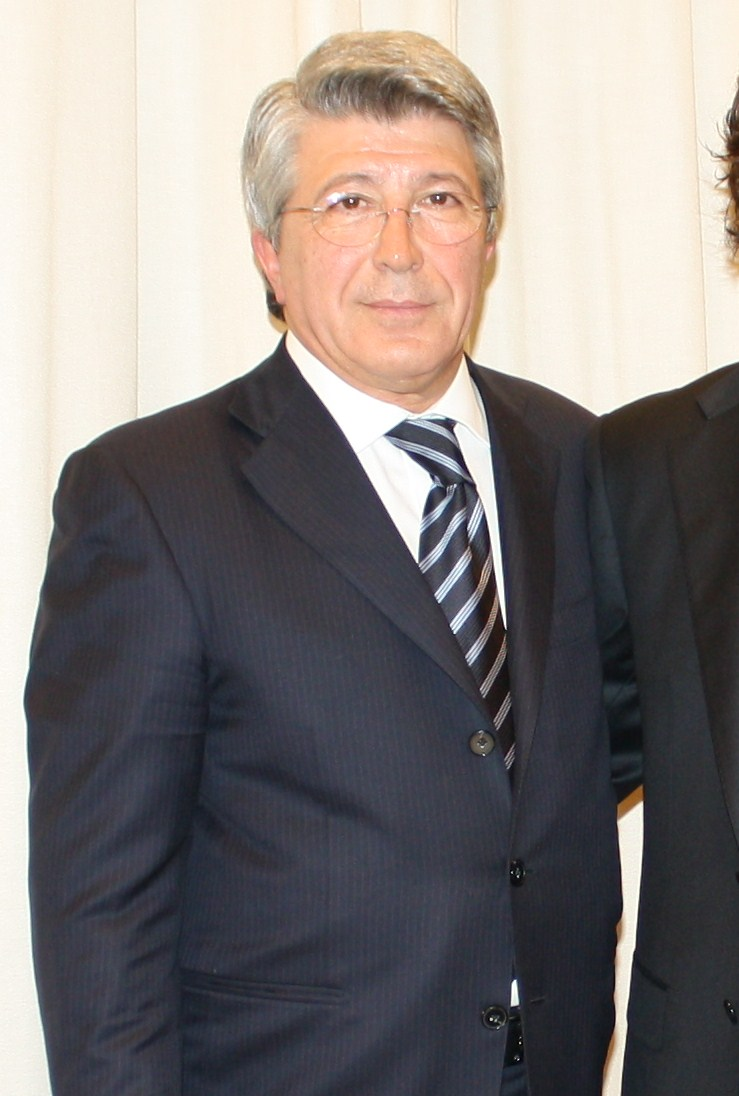
Enrique Cerezo, the current president of Atlético Madrid.

Atlético Madrid is a professional association football club based in Madrid, Spain, which plays in La Liga. This chronological list comprises all those who have held the position of president of the first team of Atlético Madrid from 1903, when the first president was elected, to the present day. Each president's entry includes his dates of tenure, honours won, and significant achievements while under his care.

Throughout its history, only two presidents have been at the head of the club on two different occasions: Julián Ruete, whose first term was between 1912 and 1919, returning a year later to the presidency, where he remained until 1923, and Vicente Calderón, who was president between 1964 and 1980 and between 1982 and 1987.

Adding his two terms, Vicente Calderón is the one who has remained in office the longest, with a total of 21 years. He is closely followed by Enrique Cerezo with 20 years in the presidency, Jesús Gil with 16, Julián Ruete with 10, and Javier Barroso with 9.

== List of presidents ==
Name	Count	From	Until	Honours	Achievements
Enrique Allende	(Spain)	1903	1903		
Eduardo de Acha	(Spain)	1903	1907		He drafted the very first Statutes of the club in 1906.
Ricardo de Gondra	(Spain)	1907	1909		
Ramón de Cárdenas	(Spain)	1909	1912		
Julián Ruete	(Spain)	1912	1919		He inaugurated the O'Donnell field in 1913.
Álvaro de Aguilar	(Spain)	1919	1920		
Julián Ruete	(Spain)	1920	1923	1 Copa del Rey final	
Juan Estefanía	(Spain)	1923	1926	1 Regional Championship; 1 Copa del Rey final	He eliminated all articles from the statutes that made reference to the club's Basque origins.
Luciano Urquijo	(Argentina)	1926	1931		He faced the professionalization of football under his mandate.
Rafael González Iglesias	(Spain)	1931	1935		Achieved promotion to the top tier.
José Luis del Valle	(Spain)	1935	1936		
José Maria Fernández	(Spain)	1936	1939		
Francisco Vives	(Spain)	1939	1939		Main architect behind the merge between Atlético and Aviación.
Luis Navarro	(Spain)	1939	1941	1 La Liga; 1 Spanish Super Cup; 1 regional championship	
Manuel Gallego	(Spain)	1941	1945	1 La Liga	Atlético returned to the Metropolitano.
Juan Touzón	(Spain)	1946	1947		The club changed its name to Atlético Madrid.
Cesáreo Galíndez	(Spain)	1947	1952	2 La Liga; 1 Copa Presidente	
Luis Benitez de Lugo	(Spain)	1952	1955		
Jesús Suevos	(Spain)	1955	1955		He created the Athletic Senate, made up of the first hundred members of the club.
Javier Barroso	(Spain)	1955	1964	2 Copa del Rey	
Vicente Calderón	(Spain)	1964	1980	4 La Liga; 3 Copa del Rey; 1 Intercontinental Cup	
Ricardo de Irezábal	(Spain)	1980	1980		
Alfonso Cabeza	(Spain)	1980	1982		
Antonio del Hoyo	(Spain)	1982	1982		
Agustín Cotorruelo	(Spain)	1982	1982		
Vicente Calderón	(Spain)	1982	1987	1 Copa del Rey	
Francisco Javier	(Spain)	1987	1987		
Jesús Gil	(Spain)	1987	2003	1 La Liga; 3 Copa del Rey	
Enrique Cerezo	(Spain)	2003	Present	2 La Liga; 2 Copa del Rey	
