= Tablada =

Tablada may refer to:

- José Juan Tablada (1871–1945), Mexican poet, art critic, and diplomat
- La Tablada, a city in Buenos Aires Province, Argentina
- Tablada Nueva, a neighbourhood (barrio) of Asunción, Paraguay
- Club La Tablada, a multi-sports club from Córdoba, Argentina
- Tablada Aerodrome, a former sports and aviation venue in Seville, Spain
