= Luis Benitez de Lugo =

Spanish athlete and sports leader (1916–2008)

- Born: Luis Juan Francisco Benítez de Lugo y Ascanio Enrich; 10 March 1916; Madrid, Spain
- Died: 21 December 2008 (aged 92); Las Palmas, Canary Islands, Spain
- Citizenship: Spanish
- Occupations: Athlete; Sports leader

18th president of Atlético Madrid
- In office 1952–1955
- Preceded by: Cesáreo Galíndez
- Succeeded by: Jesús Suevos

President of the Spanish Swimming Federation
- In office 1968–1972
- Preceded by: Bernat Picornell
- Succeeded by: Enrique Landa

Luis Juan Francisco Benítez de Lugo y Ascanio Enrich (10 March 1916 – 21 December 2008) was a Spanish athlete who presided over a total of 17 National Federations, including Swimming (1968–1972). He founded and directed around thirty companies and societies, but he is best known for being the 18th president of Atlético Madrid between 1952 and 1955.

He held the noble title of Marquis of Florida.

== Early life ==
Luis Benitez de Lugo was born on 10 March 1916 in Madrid, as the son of Luis Benítez de Lugo y Brier, 8th Marquis of Florida, and his wife Juana de Jesús de Ascanio y García. His family was of Canarian descent and possessed several noble titles, including, among others, the marquisate of Florida since 1685, which was given by King Charles II of Spain to Don Francisco del Hoyo y Calderón Lugo y Benítez de Vergara, Perpetual Ruler of Tenerife.

== Military career ==
Benítez de Lugo began his law studies in the mid-1930s, but when the Spanish Civil War broke out, his activism in the Falange made him take refuge in the French embassy to save his life. After fleeing Madrid, he joined the rebel side, in which he fought as a provisional second lieutenant (Alférez provisional), in the Tabor de Regulares, Mérida, Palma, and Cádiz, being wounded in the battles of Teruel and Ebro, obtaining various decorations, such as the collective military medal and the medal of suffering for the Fatherland.

After the war, Benítez de Lugo held several positions related to his military character, including president of the Brotherhood of Provisional Ensigns of the Canary Islands and founding president of both the National Brotherhood of Provisional Ensigns, and of the European Confederation of Ex-combatants, being also a co-founder of the National Confederation of Ex-Combatants and, since 1999, the president of the later. He was a Knight of the Legion of Honour and was in possession, among other decorations, of the Grand Cross of Military Merit.

== Sporting career ==
=== Sports athlete ===
During his youth, Benítez de Lugo stood out as a great athlete, standing out as a top-class tennis player, winning back-to-back Copa del Rey de tenis in 1946 and 1947, at the age of 30 and 31. During this period, one of his ball boys was the future US Open champion Manuel Santana. He was also a prominent international swimmer and hockey player. He also played football as a starter in the Madrid Law School team, which Santiago Bernabéu was then coaching, with whom he obtained the title of Spanish Champion in 1935.

=== Sports manager ===
In 1949, Benítez de Lugo, at the time treasurer and member of Atlético Madrid, played a crucial role in the creation of UD Las Palmas when he mediated with the Castilian Federation, who was the most reluctant to the incorporation of the club. He was present on the day the club was founded on 22 August 1949, in which he spoke words of encouragement and loyalty to the president of the management company, José del Río Amor, later ratified as first president.

During his years as Atlético's treasurer, Benítez de Lugo generated the signing of several Canarian footballers, such as Durán, Campos, Arencibia, Farias, Hernández Lobito Negro, Miguel and, above all of them, Alfonso Silva, a figure for whom the marquis always felt a special predilection. In the club's presidential elections of 16 June 1952, Benítez de Lugo defeated the person who had held the position since 1947, Cesáreo Galíndez, whose board he had been part of as treasurer. His management at the head of the club was not very good and the fans did not forgive him for not maintaining the team's level of the previous presidency, which had won the league in 1950–51. On 20 May 1955, after a confrontation with the Delegación Nacional de Deportes, due to his intention to take the team on a tour of America to raise funds with the government opposition, he was dismissed as president, being replaced by Jesús Suevos.

Benítez de Lugo presided over a total of 17 National Federations, including swimming (1968–1972), which led him to obtain a silver medal from the Royal Order of Sports Merit. However, the sporting aspect that he cultivated the most, and in which he achieved the greatest success, was equestrian, where he used the toponymy of the Canarian geography on the majority of the forty horses in his stable since most of them were named after islands, such as Bajamar, Morro Jable, Teide, Orotava, El Guanche, Tazacorte, El Médano, Gran Canaria, Roque Nublo and, above all, Maspalomas.

== Later life ==
In February 1958, Benitez de Lugo was the president of a company that owned a tourist complex in the center of the Costa Brava, specifically in Pola Giverola on an area of three beaches, projecting a marina under the direction of the Spanish architects Emiliano Castro and Raúl Martín and the Swiss Marc Saugey, thus creating a new coastal tourist town on the Girona coast.

In 1961 Benitez de Lugo joined the Association of Hidalgos a Fuero de España. In 2004 he received the "Víctor Pradera" Award from the Círculos San Juan.

In 2003, the 86-year-old Benitez de Lugo was one of the Atletico presidents who attended an event at the Casa de Correos de la Comunidad in Madrid, in which he was one of the most applauded.

== Personal life ==
On 5 June 1937, Benitez de Lugo married María del Rosario Massieu y Fernández del Campo, 3rd Marchioness of Arucas (1917–2003). The couple had five children, with their first-born inheriting their noble titles, Luis Felipe Benítez de Lugo y Massieu (1938–), 19th Marquis of Lanzarote, 11th Marquis of Florida, 5th Marquis of Arucas, with descendants. The other four were María del Carmen, María del Rosario, Juan José, and Francisco de Borja Benítez de Lugo y Massieu.

Despite being born in Madrid, he never forgot the Canary Islands, the land of his ancestors, acting as a Canary Islander and even boasting about his Canarian heritage. He lived there in the last few decades of his life.

== Death ==
Benitez de Lugo died at the Insular University Hospital of Gran Canaria in the Canary Islands on 21 December 2008, at the age of 91.

== Bibliography ==
- Rodríguez Jiménez, José Luis (1994). Reaccionarios y golpistas: la extrema derecha en España: del tardofranquismo a la consolidación de la democracia, 1967-1982 [Reactionaries and coup plotters: the extreme right in Spain: from late Francoism to the consolidation of democracy, 1967-1982]. Madrid: Spanish National Research Council. ISBN 84-00-07442-4.
