= Bernat Picornell =

Spanish swimmer and sports leader

Bernardo Picornell
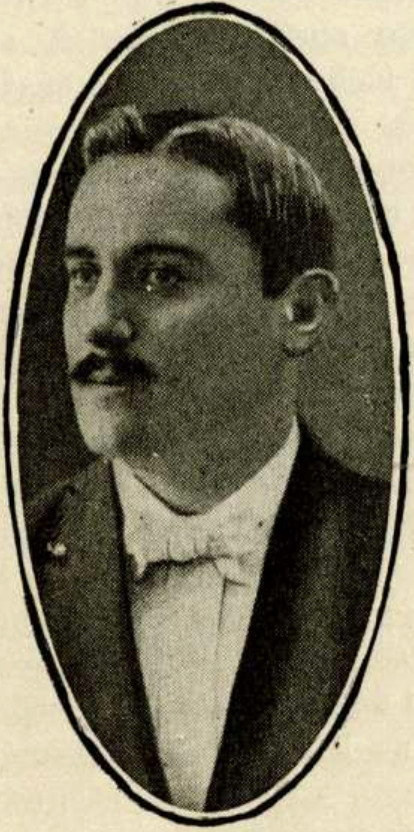
- Bernardo Picornell
- Born: Bernat Picornell i Richier; 31 December 1883; Marseille, France
- Died: 27 September 1970 (aged 86); Barcelona, Catalonia, Spain
- Citizenship: Spanish
- Occupations: Swimmer; Sports leader
- Known for: President of the Spanish Swimming Federation

1st President of the Spanish Swimming Federation
- In office 1922–1968
- Succeeded by: Luis Benitez de Lugo

Bernardo Picornell Richier (31 December 1883 – 27 September 1970) was a Spanish swimmer and sports leader. He is widely regarded as one of the most important figures in the amateur beginnings of swimming in Spain since he was the fundamental head behind the organization of its first championship in 1907, the foundation of its first club in 1907, the writer of its first chronicles, and the first president of the Spanish Swimming Federation, a position that he held for over four decades between 1922 and 1968. He was also the main driving force behind the organization of its first water polo match in Spain in 1908.

== Swimming career ==
Bernat Picornell was born on 31 December 1883 in Marseille, as the son of a Mallorcan boat captain. As a young man, he participated in swimming championships in his hometown. He moved to Barcelona in 1905, at the age of 22, where he continued his interest in the world of sports, through which he met Manuel Solé, owner of the Gimnasio Solé, and together, in 1907, they organized the first swimming competition in Spain, which took the name of the Spanish Swimming Championship-Copa Solé. This initiative gave him the idea to found, in the same year, the first swimming club in the history of Spain, the Club Natació Barcelona, which was established on 10 November 1907 at the Gimnasio Solé, settling itself first in the Eastern Baths of Barceloneta and later in the Baths of Sant Sebastià. At the time, aquatic activities in Spain were presented only as a leisure sport, mostly with no competitiveness. However, at the end of the 19th century and the beginning of the 20th century, this changed under the influence of Picornell and Solé, the former bringing the experience of having competed in swimming and water polo while the latter stood out in sports practice in a pioneering way, having previously used his gym to host the founding of the football club FC Barcelona in 1899.

Picornell presided over Club Natació Barcelona in an alternative way between 1908 and 1931. Under his leadership, the club organized the first recorded water polo match in Spain, which was played in Catalonia on 12 July 1908 between two teams mostly made up of foreign residents in Barcelona, on the Barceloneta beach, and which was refereed by Picornell himself. In that same year, he organized the first Winter Championship, which from the second edition was called the Christmas Cup, and in 1909 the Easter Grand Prix, tournaments that are still held today. He also wrote the first chronicles of swimming in all of Spain in the columns of Mundo Deportivo.

Picornell was well connected with the great world personalities of swimming and sports in general such as the Pierre de Coubertin, the creator of the modern Olympic Games, of whom he was a personal friend and with whom he shared his ideas about the amateur sport. He was president of the Barcelona Natació Club for many years, as well as of the Spanish Swimming Federation and the Bureau of the Federation Internationale de Natation Amateur. In 1920, Picornell intervened in the foundation of the Spanish Amateur Swimming Federation, which he chaired from 1932 to 1968, and promoted the attendance of Catalan swimmers at the 1920 Olympic Games in Antwerp. He also participated in the foundation of the Catalan Swimming Federation in 1921. He was a member of the Spanish Olympic Committee and since 1952, a member of the Fédération Internationale de Natation Amateur (FINA) and instituted the Picornell Challenge, which was awarded to the members of the Spanish 4 × 200 m free relay champion teams. He managed to have the 1970 European Aquatics Championships held in Barcelona, at the municipal swimming pools of Montjuïc, which had been named after Bernat Picornell. He died in Barcelona on 27 September 1970 shortly after finishing the European Swimming Championships.

In 1946, Picornell was named honorary president of the Catalan federation, from which he received the Extraordinary Medal for sporting merit in 1957. From the Delegación Nacional de Deportes, he received the Gold Medal for Sports Merit in 1957 and the Spanish State awarded him the Knight's Cross of the Order of Civil Merit (1958), and the French named him officer of the Royal Order of Sports Merit in 1959. In 1993 he became part of the honor list of the International Swimming Hall of Fame, as a Pioneer Contributor.
