= Francisco Vives =

Francisco Vives may refer to:

- Francisco Vives (engineer) (1900–1997), Spanish military aviator and aeronautical engineer
- Francisco Dionisio Vives (1755–1840), Spanish general and governor of Cuba
