= Francisco Vives (engineer) =

Spanish military aviator and sports leader

- Born: Francisco Vives Camino; 19 August 1900; Alcalá de Henares, Community of Madrid, Spain
- Died: 5 June 1997 (aged 96); Azuqueca de Henares, Castilla–La Mancha, Spain
- Citizenship: Spanish
- Occupations: Spanish military aviator; Sports leader
- Known for: Founding Atlético Aviación and of Atlético Madrid

President of Atlético Madrid
- In office 1939–1939
- Preceded by: José María Fernández
- Succeeded by: Luis Navarro

Francisco Vives Camino (19 August 1900 – 5 June 1997) was a Spanish military aviator, aeronautical engineer, lieutenant general of the Air Force, and the 13th president of Atlético Madrid.

== Early life ==
Francisco Vives was born in Alcalá de Henares on 19 August 1900 as the son of the engineer commander Pedro Vives Vich, a pioneer of Spanish military aeronautics and the head of the Aerostation Service created on 24 August 1896 in Guadalajara, which he directed from December 1896 until 1916.

== Professional career ==
Vives received his air baptism in 1910, when he was only a boy of 10, and he entered the Academy of Engineers of Guadalajara on 19 August 1915, his 15th birthday, from which he left as a lieutenant of the Corps, after completing the regulatory studies on 12 July 1920. His first destination was the Aerostation Battalion, also located in the Academy of the Army of Engineers, in the city of Guadalajara, where he remained until 1922, the year in which he transferred to the Aviation Service, which would gradually separate from the Corps of Engineers in which he had been born. In his new assignment, he was in charge of the works at the Tétouan airfield in Spanish Morocco.

Vives completed the airplane pilot course in Getafe in 1922, and on 18 August of the following year, he was promoted to captain of Engineers by a Royal Order. Later that same year, in 1923, he was assigned to operations in the Rif, where he took part in all the operations that were carried out during the Rif War. He later obtained the title of Senior Airplane Pilot, becoming the captain of engineers and joining the Melilla airfield, where he took charge of the Segunda Escuadrilla (Second Squadron).

In 1925, Vives was seriously wounded in combat, but after a long recovery he joined the Bréguet 14 Squadron as a pilot, under the command of Captain Mariano Barberán, with which he took part in the Alhucemas landing. During the time of the great Spanish aviation raids he was an exceptional witness of these trips, actively participating in the preparation of some of them, such as the flight of the Cuatro Vientos, when he held the position of Military Attaché at the Spanish embassy in Cuba.

Vives was later assigned to the School of Mechanics, but was again on temporary leave to recover from the injuries suffered in 1925. He returned to activity briefly in 1928, becoming a supernumerary worker without pay. In 1931, when the Army reform was promoted by D. Manuel Azaña, he was still in Cuba, and abandoned military life. Two years later he served as a contact on the Cuban island for the preparation of the Seville-Havana flight, which would be carried out by the Engineer Commander D. Mariano Barberán.

Vives returned to Spain in 1934 and two years later, in 1936, he was directing the construction of the San Pablo airport in Seville, when the military uprising that led to the outbreak of the Spanish Civil War occurred. Having joined the "national" side, he was readmitted to the Military Aviation as a commander, actively collaborating in the resolution of technical problems of all kinds that arose, especially in the first days, due to the rebels' lack of means and later throughout the entire contest. In 1936 he worked in Seville as an engineer for a company, joining the military movement at the Tablada base. He then participated in war services while at the same time carrying out important work as head of the Air Force Fuel Service.

=== Presidency of Atlético Madrid ===
Vives had been a follower of Atlético Madrid since he was a child. In 1937, three aviation officers from the 35th Aviation Automobile Unit decided to create a football team, and Vives, then a Lieutenant colonel of the Air Force, became one of the team's first footballers, thus helping to found Atlético Aviación.

after the war, Atlético Madrid was left in very bad shape, so in order to survive, they decided to merge with Aviación. On 4 October, the representatives of both sides signed the absorption agreements and appoint the first Board of Directors with Commander Francisco Vives Camino as president of the now Athletic-Aviation Club. On October 4, 1939, he eventually became president of the Athletic Aviación Club football club when the merger between the Athletic Club de Madrid and Aviación Nacional football clubs was signed, although he was replaced in that position shortly after, in December, by Lieutenant Colonel Luis Navarro Garnica.

== Later life ==
After the war, Vives was appointed general director of Infrastructure of the Air Ministry, a position he held for ten years, rising to colonel in 1943. In 1942 he obtained the title of Aeronautical Engineer, specializing in Aircraft, and was later appointed professor (airport subject) at the School of Aeronautical Engineers. He was part of the Spanish commission at the Convention on International Civil Aviation in Chicago in 1944, working within the aforementioned commission on the creation of airport standards. He was also named head of the last Spanish Savoia-Marchetti SM.79 group to be established, 6-G-28.

Vives was successively: general secretary of the Ministry of Air (1949), general director of Instruction (1954), second head of the Pyrenean Region and head of the Zaragoza Sector (1958), and, finally, head of the Balearic Air Zone (1962). In 1956 he was promoted to brigadier general and in 1964 to lieutenant general, moving to second reserve status in 1970. He joined the reserve in 1966, helping to create the Historical Service of the Air Force and actively collaborating with the Institute of Aeronautical History and Culture.

Vives actively participated in the creation of the Historical Service of the Air Force, frequently collaborating with the Institute of Aeronautical History and Culture. Throughout his life, Vives was a tireless promoter of all initiatives that led to the development of aviation in all his aspects.

== Death and legacy ==
Vives died in Azuqueca de Henares on 5 June 1997, at the age of 96.

In October 2023, a unique aeronautical facility in Spain located in Robledillo de Mohernando was renamed as Lieutenant General Vives Camino Aerodrome in tribute to Vives. This ground in Robledillo is the only one in Spain equipped with two parallel runways of more than 1,000 meters in length, as well as two other crossed runways, which allows flexibility and an extraordinary level of growth and development in the field of aviation in general.
