= Cesáreo Galíndez =

Spanish sports leader (1894–1990)

- Born: Cesáreo Galíndez Sánchez; 23 September 1894; Gordexola, Biscay, Spain
- Died: 15 March 1990 (aged 95); Madrid, Spain
- Citizenship: Spanish
- Occupations: Businessman; Sports leader

17th president of Atlético Madrid
- In office 1947–1952
- Preceded by: Juan Touzón
- Succeeded by: Luis Benitez de Lugo

Cesáreo Galíndez Sánchez (23 September 1894 – 15 March 1990) was a Spanish businessman and the 17th president of Atlético Madrid between 1947 and 1952. The presidency of Cesáreo Galíndez is considered one of the most fruitful in the club's history because, under his leadership, the club won two league titles and the Copa Eva Duarte. Another of Galíndez's achievements was the creation and consolidation of the club's handball section, one of the most important in the club's history.

== Biography ==
Cesáreo Galíndez was born on 23 September 1894 in the Biscayan town of Gordexola, later settling in the capital of Spain, where he became a jeweler industrialist by profession.

In 1931, Galíndez joined the board of directors of Atlético Madrid as a member, when Rafael González Iglesias was elected president. Later, and once the Spanish Civil War was over, he became one of the representatives of the club during its merger with Club Aviación Nacional, a process that led to the so-called Club Atlético Aviación, of which Galíndez would be secretary of the Board of Directors since October 1939.

In July 1947, Galíndez was appointed as the 17th elected president of the club, which a few months earlier had changed its name to the current Club Atlético de Madrid, after breaking up the ties that linked it to the Air Force. The presidency of Cesáreo Galíndez is considered one of the most fruitful in the club's history because, under his leadership, the club won two league titles in 1949–50 and 1950–51 and the Copa Eva Duarte in 1951. His mandate began during the period of the so-called Delantera de Seda (José Juncosa, Antonio Vidal, Alfonso Silva, Juan Escudero, and Campos), one of the most remembered in athletic history. Other notable players signed during his presidency were Larbi Benbarek (1948) and technicians joined as Helenio Herrera (1949). In fact, when the former played a friendly match for Stade Français at the Metropolitano on 6 May 1948, someone in the box, which many believe to have been the president Galíndez himself, exclaimed: "We have to sign the black man!".

Galíndez created the club's handball section in 1948, back when 11-a-side handball was played on football fields. Atlético were champions of Castilla twice in 1949 and 1950, and the runners-up of the Spanish Championship three years between 1949 and 1951. Starting in 1952, indoor handball began to be played in Spain with seven players and Atlético were champions of Castilla in 1952 and of Spain in 1952 and 1954. It has since won 11 Spanish Leagues and 10 Spanish Cups between 1952 and 1987.

Another of Galíndez's achievements came in April 1950, when Atlético acquired ownership of the Metropolitan Stadium, where it had been playing its matches since 1923. The club paid eleven million eight hundred thousand pesetas for it, which meant the consolidation of its assets for the club.

On 16 June 1952, Galíndez ran for new elections to revalidate his mandate, with the aim of addressing the remodeling and reform of the Metropolitan, but he lost them to his treasurer Luis Benitez de Lugo, Marquis of Florida, who got 2.795 votes against Galíndez's 2.488.

Cesáreo Galíndez served as vice president of the Royal Spanish Football Federation between 1954 and 1956, during the presidency of the former president of Atlético de Madrid, Juan Touzón.

== Death ==
Galíndez died in Madrid on 15 March 1990, at the age of 95.
