= History of Cubana de Aviación =

Cubana de Aviación S.A is Cuba's largest airline and flag carrier, it has also a Cargo version named a Cubana de Aviación Cargo S.A.Cubana de Aviación was created on October 8 1929, operating Sikorsky S-38. After the Cuban Revolution, the airline started operating Soviet aircraft like the An-24, Il 18, Il 62m, and Tu-154B2.

Following the end of the Cold War, the airline began operating Fokker F27 ATR 42-300, ATR 72-500, Airbus A320-200, Boeing 737-500, Boeing 737-300, Boeing 737-200 (both aircraft were wet leased from Global Air), Tu-204-100, Il-96-300 and An-148.

== History ==
=== Establishment ===
Cubana was established on 8 October 1929 as Compañía Nacional Cubana de Aviación Curtiss, indicating its association with the Curtiss aircraft manufacturing company. It was one of the earliest airlines to emerge in Latin America. Cubana's predecessors were the Compañía Aérea de Cuba, founded in 1919, and the Compañía Aérea Cubana, founded in 1920 (both airlines flew out of Havana's Columbia Airport, which started operations in 1919). Those companies were dissolved soon after they started, however, due to the difficult economic conditions affecting Cuba (and many other nations) in the aftermath of World War I.

Other air transport companies in Cuba at the time of Cubana's founding were Servicio Cubano de Aviación, Líneas Aéreas de Cuba, and Compañía Nacional Cubana de Transporte Aéreo. All of these companies existed only for short periods of time, and had limited finances. They mostly operated occasional flights that carried packages for urgent delivery, or individuals who sought air travel for private business trips or recreational purposes. They were all greatly affected by the onset of the Great Depression in 1929 and the early 1930s, and the subsequent drop in air traffic.

Cubana de Aviación Curtiss started services in 1930 with Curtiss Robin aircraft, followed by Sikorsky S-38 amphibians and Ford Trimotors. Amphibious service linked the coastal mining areas in the eastern part of Cuba, while the land-based Curtiss Robins and Ford Trimotors served the major provincial cities. The Curtiss Aviation School, owned by the Curtiss airplane manufacturing company, had trained Cuban pilots starting in the 1910s, thus creating the expertise necessary for the emergence of Cubana. Among the early Cuban aviation aces was Agustín Parlá Orduña, a 1912 graduate of the Curtiss School, who had headed the Compañía Aérea de Cuba in 1919.

=== Early years ===
Visits to Cuba by famous aviators, and news about their exploits, favored Cubana's start-up. They generated interest in aviation and its commercial possibilities in Cuba, at a time when civil aviation was mostly a recreational activity. Among them were the Spanish-Cuban aviator Domingo Rosillo, who completed the first flight across the Strait of Florida (Key West to Havana) in 1913, French aviator Charles Nungesser in 1924, and the American Charles Lindbergh in his "Spirit of St. Louis" airplane in 1928. After Cubana's founding, the Spanish aviators Mariano Barberán and Joaquín Collar completed the first transatlantic flight from Spain to Cuba in 1933, followed in 1936 by the first Cuba-to-Spain (Havana-Seville) flight by Cuban aviator Antonio Menéndez Peláez in an open cockpit, single-engine airplane. These and other feats promoted interest in long-distance flight.

Pan American Airways (then known as Pan American Airways System or PAA) acquired Cubana in 1932, and the word Curtiss was deleted from the airline's name. Financial difficulties in the U.S.-based Curtiss aircraft manufacturing company, due to the deepening economic depression, partly motivated the sale. Cubana therefore became a subsidiary of Pan American Airways. At that time, Pan American had started to assemble a Latin American and Caribbean network, linking together air services in various nations with its own international routes in the Americas and the Caribbean. Pan American's own first-ever international scheduled service had started from Florida to Cuba in the 1920s (Key West-Havana). Acquiring Cubana therefore made sense to PAA's management as it expanded operations beyond Cuba toward the rest of Latin America and the Caribbean.

Cuba's populist revolution of 1933 had little effect on Cubana and on Pan American's ownership of the airline. Despite the nationalist character of the new government which seized power from 1933 until 1940, Pan American's investment in Cubana was safeguarded. The economic depression of the 1930s did affect Cuba, but its impact on Cubana was not substantial. At the time, much of Cubana's revenue was derived from carrying mail for Cuba's postal service. Airline passenger traffic was very limited, due to the small capacity of aircraft in those times. Also, people who chose to travel by air were mostly a select elite. Air travellers within Cuba in the 1930s were mostly wealthy business people, well-paid professionals, or well-to-do individuals who could afford the relatively high fares.

Twin-engine Lockheed Model 10 Electras joined Cubana's fleet in 1934, allowing the airline to extend its routes within Cuba. These aircraft, which were among the most advanced in their time, were part of Pan American's investment in Cubana. The Lockheed Electras allowed Cubana to expand its land-based operations, serving cities which previously had no access to scheduled airline service. The expansion of Cubana's routes was accompanied by the creation of Cuba's Civil Aviation School in 1936, headed by Cuban aviation ace Ramiro Leonard. The school trained many aviators who would join Cubana's operations. By 1940, Cubana's fleet had a total of 12 aircraft, all of which were used in the airline's growing domestic network.

The Lockheed Electras were followed by the Douglas DC-3 in 1944 and the Curtiss C-46 in 1946. As a subsidiary of Pan American Airways, Cubana's technical operations, aircraft livery, crews' uniforms and even the airline's logo closely followed those of Pan American (the PAA-style logo was retained until 1957). Cubana's route system within Cuba fed passengers to Pan American's international flights, providing connections through Havana. This relationship was similar to that of other Pan American Airways subsidiaries in Latin America, such as Mexicana de Aviación and Panair do Brasil.

In 1944 the name of the airline was changed to Compañía Cubana de Aviación S.A. A majority share in the airline was then sold to Cuban investors in that year, with Pan American Airways retaining a 42% stake. Pan American had been expanding rapidly, acquiring or setting up subsidiaries throughout Latin America (and re-establishing its Pacific and North Atlantic services as the end of World War II approached), and needed to raise capital. This change in majority ownership marked Cubana's ascendance as a Cuban enterprise, and made the airline a source of national pride. From 1944, Cubana would remain a private enterprise supported primarily by domestic capital.

In 1944, the first International Conference on Civil Aviation was convened, which later would lead to the creation of the International Civil Aviation Organization (ICAO). Cuba was a participant in this conference and a founding member of ICAO, helping set the framework for international agreements that would rule civil aviation during the second half of the 20th century. In April 1945, the conference that created the International Air Transport Association (IATA) was held in Havana. Cubana became a founding member of IATA, and participated in the creation of that organization through its involvement with the Havana conference and the resulting accords. Both conferences and the organizations they spawned helped establish Cubana as an internationally recognized airline company.

During its first 16 years Cubana's scheduled services were exclusively domestic. Its route system used Havana as its main hub, with frequent flights to the nation's major provincial cities. Cubana's founding in 1929 had coincided with the opening of Havana's José Martí International Airport, allowing the airline to establish a permanent operational base there. Located 18 km. from central Havana, near the town of Rancho Boyeros, the new airport provided ample space for expansion (compared to Havana's old Columbia Airport, which was hemmed by the city's rapid growth). During the 1930s, Cubana expanded its services to serve most every major city in Cuba. Then, the Second World War stymied Cubana's expansion, due to limited supplies of fuel and aircraft. By the end of the War, however, Cubana was ready to launch its first international route.

=== International expansion ===
In May 1945 Cubana started its first scheduled international flights, from Havana to Miami using Douglas DC-3 aircraft. Cubana was the first Latin American airline to establish scheduled passenger services to Miami. Flights on this route carried mostly business people and tourists, and they helped start tourism travel as an important market for commercial aviation. The Miami route, because of its economic and political significance, would later prove to be an important part of Cubana's history.

In April 1948 a transatlantic route was started between Havana and Madrid (via Bermuda, the Azores and Lisbon) using Douglas DC-4 aircraft. The DC-4 was Cubana's first four-engine aircraft, and it required five cockpit crew members to operate (captain, first officer, flight engineer, navigator and radio operator). The DC-4 that started the transatlantic route had a pressurized cabin and was christened "Estrella de Cuba" (CU-T188). A second DC-4 was christened "Estrella de Oriente" (CU-T397) and replaced the DC-3s on Cubana's Miami route. The Madrid route was extended to Rome in 1950 (the Madrid-Rome segment was later discontinued). The new route to Europe made Cubana one of the earliest Latin American carriers to establish scheduled transatlantic service. At the time, most European airlines did not have any transatlantic routes, and Cubana became the only carrier offering direct service from continental Europe to the Caribbean. Later, in the early 1950s, the DC-4s were replaced by Lockheed Constellations (L-049), the main type of aircraft used at the time for long-distance commercial air travel.

Cubana Super Constellation L-1049E in flight, 1953

In the early 1950s the airline purchased several Lockheed Super Constellations (L-1049E and L-1049G) from the U.S., and turboprop Vickers Viscount (VV-755) aircraft from Britain to renovate its fleet. The first Super Constellation (L-1049E, registered as CU-P573) was delivered in early 1953, and was placed in service on Cubana's Madrid route. Cubana was Lockheed's launch customer for the L-1049E. The Super Constellations allowed Cubana to start service to Mexico City, New York City, and to increase frequencies to Madrid via Bermuda, the Azores and Lisbon. With these aircraft, Cubana became the first Latin American airline to establish services to New York. The Viscounts were used for its Miami and Nassau flights, and for domestic services to Camagüey and Santiago de Cuba. Cubana's turboprop Viscount flights to Miami from Havana and Varadero became popular with travellers, because of their shorter flight time, quieter ride, and superb onboard service. Cubana usually operated as many as five daily roundtrip Viscount flights between Havana and Miami year-round, with additional flights during holiday periods. The Miami route therefore became Cubana's main international source of revenue during the 1950s.

In 1954, the airline became fully Cuban-owned when Pan American Airways sold its minority stake. This marked Cubana's independence as a private Cuban enterprise. Cuban investors were drawn to Cubana by the airline's potential for growth and by its achievements, such as the quality of passenger services, the renovation of its fleet (which was among the most advanced in Latin America), the experience of its crews, and its projected international expansion. An additional attraction were the airline's promotional efforts to cater to Cuba's growing tourism industry, particularly with American travellers.

Tourism was a nascent industry in the 1950s. Havana, having one of the best hotel and communication infrastructures in Latin America, became a tourist playground, attracting more tourism than any other Latin American city in the mid-1950s. The city's proximity to the U.S. provided a formidable advantage that helped consolidate its position as a prime tourist destination. Cubana took advantage of Havana's excellent tourist infrastructure and amenities by pioneering the combination of flights, hotels and tours as a package. An example of this strategy was the airline's "Tropicana flights" from Miami, which combined flights, hotel, ground transport, and admission to the internationally famous Tropicana Cabaret in Havana. By the mid-1950s, Cubana was the Latin American carrier with most experience in travel promotion.

=== Promotions ===
At a time when airline in-flight publications were practically unknown, Cubana started its own in-flight magazine, Aeroguía Cubana. The magazine was first published in March 1954. Typically about 60 pages long, with numerous photographs and illustrations, it was published in Spanish and contained articles on Cuba's tourist attractions, Cuban culture and folklore, the Cuban economy, Havana entertainment, points of interest in Cuba's provinces, a directory of Havana museums, hotels, restaurants, night clubs, and a calendar of upcoming monthly cultural and sports events, among other features. Aeroguía Cubana was financially supported through advertisements from major, well-known Cuban private enterprises, such as the Bacardi liquor company, major Havana hotels, the department store El Encanto, and internationally well-known entertainment venues, such as the Tropicana and Montmartre cabarets (both in Havana). Issues of the magazine also often included articles on the airline's international destinations, such as a history of Miami (in the November 1954 issue), along with a humor-comics section and cross-word puzzles. Aeroguía Cubana was distributed freely in all of the airline's international services, and in its domestic flights.

In 1957, Cubana started a second publication, the Cubana Courier, a bilingual monthly newspaper. This publication was oriented toward travel agents and the tourism promotion industry, particularly in the U.S. Cubana Courier's reporting covered a wide range of subjects related to tourism in Cuba and the Cuban economy, among them articles covering Cuban tourism statistics, the Cuban construction industry, Havana's infrastructure, new tourism programmes, and foreign investment in Cuba. The newspaper also sometimes included educational supplements, such as a booklet explaining the workings of the Rolls-Royce Dart turboprop engines which powered Cubana's Vickers Viscount aircraft. Cubana Courier was made available at the airline's international and domestic offices, and was distributed by mail to travel professionals in the U.S., Cuba, and other nations. This newspaper reflected Cubana's growing experience with tourism promotion. To many of the airline's investors, it was a welcome indication of Cubana's pioneering efforts in tourism promotion, and its growing expertise in mass communications related to tourism and travel.

Cubana's travel promotion strategies also enlisted consultants and publicists with wide access to the media. Contracts with American advertising and public relations firms allowed the airline to become well known in the U.S. At the same time, Cuban advertising firms helped promote Cubana's domestic and international services. The airline thus became not only well known among American travellers, but was also a favorite of Cuba's growing middle classes as vacation and business travel abroad increased, due to the nation's economic expansion throughout the 1950s.

The PAA-style logo Cubana had used since the 1930s was replaced in 1957, and a new logo and livery compatible with the advent of the jet age were adopted (the new livery and logo were retained until the late 1960s). The new logo's aerodynamic look included an oval-shaped globe showing the geographical areas served by Cubana, with Cuba in the center. It was unique among Latin American airlines, whose logos typically depicted avian-based designs or simply used their acronyms. At this time, Cubana also undertook a renovation of its fleet, opting to replace its long-range piston-prop Super Constellations with turboprop aircraft, and to expand its existing Vickers Viscount turboprop fleet in the immediate future.

=== Turboprop expansion ===
Cubana Bristol Britannia Model 318, 1958 (displaying the new logo on the tail and new livery)

Cubana placed orders for four long-range Bristol Britannia (Model 318) and four Vickers Super Viscount (VV-818) aircraft, all turboprops, for its international services (which included Madrid, New York, Mexico City, Miami, Montego Bay, Nassau, Port-au-Prince), and for some of its domestic routes (Camagüey, Santiago de Cuba, Varadero). The first Bristol Britannia (CU-T668) was delivered in late 1958, and was placed in service in the airline's New York route. The new Britannias and Super Viscounts allowed Cubana to become the first Latin American airline to fly only turboprop aircraft in all its international routes. By the late 1950s, Cubana was the Latin American airline with most experience in the operation and maintenance of British-built turboprop aircraft. It also had one of the most advanced fleets in Latin America.

The new Bristol Britannias and Super Viscounts provided the only turboprop flights to Cuba at a time when U.S.-flag carriers and all other airlines flew there only with piston-prop aircraft. Cubana's turboprop aircraft (starting with the Viscount VV-755s in the mid-1950s) shortened flight times significantly, and also provided a quieter ride than the piston-prop aircraft flown by all other carriers serving Cuba. Some of Cubana's turboprops started to set flight time records on the routes they flew. On 17 January 1959, for example, one of Cubana's new Britannias set a record for the New York-Havana route, flying it in 3 hours 28 minutes, the fastest ever for a commercial flight on that route. Similarly, on the Havana-Madrid route, Cubana's Britannias shortened total flight time by as much as 4 hours one-way, compared to the flight time of the Super Constellations (flown by a competing carrier). Cubana's Britannias thus allowed the airline to displace competing airlines on its New York, Mexico City and Madrid services, flying the routes faster, with less cabin noise and vibration, while providing excellent onboard service.

Cubana's turboprop Viscounts and Super Viscounts on the Miami flights also flew the route faster than competing carriers, with excellent inflight service and amenities upon arrival in Havana. The Miami and New York routes thus became a major source of revenue for the airline. These routes were widely promoted in the U.S. through New York-based advertising agencies, that helped create an image of excellent service and reliability for the airline among American travellers. In 1958, Cubana placed an order for two Boeing 707-139 jets, becoming one of the first Latin American carriers planning to purchase this new passenger jet (the order was cancelled in 1960, when U.S.-Cuba relations deteriorated).

Despite Cubana's advances during the 1950s and its position at the forefront of aviation in Latin America and the Caribbean, part of the year 1958 involved some difficulties for the airline. Cuba's intensifying revolutionary struggle impacted Cubana as three of its flights were hijacked. Two of the three hijackings did not result in losses, but one involved fatalities and the loss of an aircraft (a Viscount VV-755). This was the first-ever loss of life or an aircraft due to hijacking in Cubana's history. Revolutionary leaders subsequently apologized for the losses, but the incidents made it clear that Cubana's operations would no longer remain unaffected by the strife. Then, less than two months after the third hijacking incident, revolutionary leaders seized power (in January 1959), and another stage in the history of Cubana de Aviación began.

=== Revolution and socialism ===
When Cuba's populist revolutionary movement, led by Fidel Castro, overthrew Fulgencio Batista's regime in January 1959, Cubana was seen by the new government as an important resource. Building up the new government's foreign relations became an important priority, and Cubana had a major role to play in this area. Despite the fact that the airline was a private enterprise, it was viewed by the new government as Cuba's official air carrier.

The events surrounding Cuba's revolutionary process in 1959 and 1960 attracted much international interest. Numerous international celebrities visited Cuba aboard Cubana's flights, providing much publicity to the airline. Among them were French philosopher Jean-Paul Sartre and writer Simone de Beauvoir, the American singer Josephine Baker, Chilean poet (and later Nobel laureate) Pablo Neruda, British historian Hugh Thomas, Soviet filmmaker Mikhail Kalatozov, and Colombian writer (and later Nobel laureate) Gabriel García Márquez. For these and many other celebrities who visited Cuba, often as guests of the new government, Cubana was the preferred airline.

In May 1959 the revolutionary government decided to nationalise Cubana. The private passenger airline Aerovías Q and private cargo carriers Cuba Aeropostal and Expreso Aéreo Interamericano were then merged into Cubana. At that time, Aerovías Q operated Douglas DC-4 and Curtiss C-46 aircraft (modified for passenger use), while Cuba Aeropostal and Expreso Aéreo Interamericano used Douglas DC-3 and Curtiss C-46 freighters. Aerovías Q had many daily flights from Havana's Columbia Airport (at the time a mixed use military-civilian airport adjacent to the Miramar district) to Key West, Fort Lauderdale, West Palm Beach and Cuba's Isle of Pines (renamed Isla de la Juventud since the mid-1960s), but its operations were moved to José Martí International Airport shortly before the merger. Cuba Aeropostal had frequent cargo flights to Miami and within Cuba, while Expreso Aéreo Interamericano operated cargo flights to Central America and the Caribbean. Shortly before the merger, Havana's Columbia Airport (which was part of the Camp Columbia military base) began to be used solely for military traffic and was renamed Ciudad Libertad. All commercial aircraft traffic for Havana was therefore concentrated at the José Martí International Airport, located in the adjacent district of Rancho Boyeros (18 km. from central Havana).

The merger of these airlines with Cubana consolidated Cuban commercial aviation under government ownership. Cubana's name was changed to Empresa Consolidada Cubana de Aviación S.A., to reflect its new ownership and the mergers. The airline's expropriated investors, however, would soon launch a troublesome campaign against the airline. Most of Cubana's expropriated investors went into exile and sought external litigation against Cubana and against Cuba's revolutionary government. In the U.S., in particular, they joined with American investors whose properties had also been nationalised, in rejecting the new government's offer of 20-year 4.5% government bonds as compensation; a rate higher than the one paid for airline bonds in U.S. markets at that time. They instead demanded immediate payment and sought U.S. court orders to impound Cubana's aircraft. Those orders were issued at various times, starting in 1960. Such actions disrupted Cubana's U.S. operations considerably, leading to occasional flight delays or cancellations. The nationalisation of Cubana was among the first wave of business and property nationalisations enacted by Cuba's revolutionary government, as it sought greater control over the economy and the public ownership of key enterprises.

As a nationalised company and Cuba's undisputed flag carrier, Cubana became an important resource in the revolutionary government's foreign relations strategy. Domestic and international travel by the government's leaders, and visits by official guests, were coordinated through the airline. Special flights for government officials and guests were operated frequently, as the airline became an essential element of Cuba's foreign policy. Important projects, such as the creation of the Cuban government's international press agency, Prensa Latina, in 1959 used Cubana for all travel arrangements. Cubana's international offices also became closely linked with Cuba's diplomatic legations.

During 1960 many of the Cubana's most experienced crews and technicians sought employment with foreign airlines and left Cuba, reducing the airline's pool of skilled personnel. Then, by late 1960 Cubana was forced to discontinue all its U.S. routes, which included Miami and New York, along with the merged Aerovías Q and Cuba Aeropostal services to Florida (Key West, Fort Lauderdale, West Palm Beach). Rising tensions between the U.S. and Cuban governments, threats by the U.S. to impound Cubana aircraft, and the unilateral breaking of diplomatic relations by the U.S. government in January 1961, caused the cancellation of the routes. Earlier, in October 1960, the U.S. government had imposed a partial embargo on Cuba, in retaliation for the nationalisation of American properties. These actions were part of a broader U.S. strategy that had started as early as October 1959, when President Dwight D. Eisenhower approved a Central Intelligence Agency (CIA) and State Department-proposed programme to support opposition groups inside Cuba, and allow occasional air and sea-borne raids from U.S. territory. This initial programme then led to the March 1960 approval of a formal CIA plan to execute sabotage, assassinations, and to attack and invade Cuba with the objective of overthrowing its revolutionary government.

This broad strategy of aggression and sabotage culminated in the failed, CIA-planned and executed April 1961 invasion of Cuba at Playa Girón (also known as the Bay of Pigs). When an aerial bombardment of several Cuban airports by CIA-piloted and owned U.S. B-26 bombers (using fake Cuban air force livery to confound defenders) occurred on 15 April 1961, Cubana was forced to discontinue all its operations. One of Cubana's Douglas DC-3 aircraft, registered CU-T138, that was parked at Santiago de Cuba's Antonio Maceo Airport, was destroyed in one of the CIA's aerial bombing raids on that day. Other Cubana aircraft were also damaged by the bombing raids. The aerial bombardments were a prelude to the invasion landings that occurred on 17 April. After the failure of the invasion and all related military actions, the U.S. government continued and increased its strategy of sabotage, assassinations and threats against Cuba's revolutionary government and the Cuban economy. Cubana, being a most visible entity of Cuba's foreign relations, thus came under special pressure from U.S. authorities.

One way to put pressure on Cubana was to induce aircraft hijackings. The U.S. government thus crafted policies toward Cuba that led to frequent aircraft hijackings. Starting in 1961, the U.S. automatically granted asylum to any hijackers of Cubana (and any other Cuba-registered) aircraft, regardless of any crimes committed in Cuba by the hijackers, or any deaths and injuries that resulted from a hijacking. This policy provided a formidable incentive for anyone to undertake an aircraft hijacking, since all hijackers were assured of complete immunity (and impunity) once they reached the U.S. This policy caused additional problems for Cubana, beyond hijacking incidents, since hijacked aircraft were usually retained by the U.S. for periods of time, to cause a loss of the aircraft's use to the airline and to entice crews to remain in the U.S. As a result, Cubana was forced to adopt heightened security precautions in all its flights, training pilots and crew members, as well as ground personnel, to prepare for hijacking incidents. The airline was also forced to expand its fleet with reserve aircraft, to be placed in service when a hijacked aircraft was retained by the U.S.

Bristol Britannia BB-318 of Empresa Consolidada Cubana de Aviación S.A. arriving at Shannon Airport (Ireland), 1962 (en route from Prague)

Despite these problems, in late 1961 Cubana expanded its scheduled transatlantic services to Prague (in addition to its existing Madrid route) using its Bristol Britannia turboprops. This was the first scheduled service by a Latin American airline to Eastern Europe. The new Prague route made a scheduled refueling stop in Gander (Canada) before reaching Prague [stopping also in Shannon (Ireland) on the return flight]. Cubana then ceded one of its Britannias to Czechoslovak Airlines (CSA) (CU-T668, re-registered as OK-MBA by CSA) so that it could start its own Prague-Havana flights, in cooperation with Cubana's services on that route. Cubana's crews trained CSA personnel in the operation of the Britannias. This allowed CSA to establish its first-ever scheduled transatlantic service in early 1962.

The Gander and Shannon stops on Cubana's Prague route (Gander only on the Madrid route) became necessary after the U.S. government pressured and got Cubana's landing rights cancelled in Bermuda and the Azores in 1961. These stops were essential (Bermuda on the outbound and Azores on inbound flights) because Cubana's Britannias did not have the necessary range to fly nonstop to and from Europe. The Bermuda and Azores stops had been part of Cubana's transatlantic routes since 1948, when its first flights to Europe started. Fortunately for Cubana, the Canadian and Irish governments provided landing rights and refused to bend to U.S. pressure, especially when Czechoslovak Airlines (CSA) started to operate its own services on the same route (coordinated with Cubana's). The denial of those rights by Canada and Ireland would have forced Cubana to discontinue its transatlantic routes. The Gander stop, in particular, posed many challenges to Cubana's crews over the years because of very difficult winter conditions, which included snow and ice storms, icy runways, temperatures below −30 °C, and diverted flights with low fuel reserves. Also, U.S. government policies toward Cuba enticed Cubana's crews to desert their flights at Gander and emigrate to the U.S. Despite these difficulties, Cubana never experienced an accident on the Gander route during its four decades of operation.

With the U.S. breaking relations (in January 1961) and the imposition of a total U.S. embargo on Cuba on 7 February 1962 (beyond the partial one imposed in October 1960), Cubana turned to the Soviet Union to obtain new aircraft. Although the Bristol Britannias were kept in service for many years, the airline's Viscounts (VV-755) and Super Viscounts (VV-818) were sold in 1961 and 1962 to other carriers (Cunard Eagle, Trans-Australia, and South African Airways). The first Soviet-built aircraft type delivered was the twin-engine, piston-prop Ilyushin IL-14 in late 1961. Soon after, Ilyushin IL-18 four-engine turboprops were delivered, and began to be used in Cubana's domestic services. They were followed by the twin-engine Antonov AN-24 and AN-26, and the four-engine AN-12, all of them turboprops. The AN-26s and AN-12s, both freighters, helped sustain and expand Cubana's cargo operations on short- and long-range routes. These aircraft replaced all of Cubana's Viscounts, Super Viscounts and U.S.-built aircraft. Except for the Bristol Britannias, Cubana's fleet would now be made up of Soviet-built aircraft.

U.S. government actions against Cubana continued all along, with pressures being placed on Western petrol companies that supplied the airline on its international routes. Bombings, arson and other sabotage of Cubana's offices in Mexico, Canada and Western Europe also occurred occasionally, beyond aircraft hijackings. Groups and individuals claiming responsibility (or suspected) for these violent actions were known or alleged to have had CIA training or ties. Then, the missile crisis of October 1962 had a negative impact on the airline, as all of Cubana's services had to be suspended during the crisis, due to the threat of U.S. aerial bombardments and the potential for Cubana aircraft to be destroyed by U.S. warplanes. The memory of what had happened 18 months earlier (April 1961), during the CIA's aerial bombardment of Cuba, and the destruction of Cubana aircraft, caused the airline to take additional precautions (beyond suspension of all services). Some aircraft were dispersed and parked at various airports, and those flying abroad at the time the crisis started were instructed not to return. Disruptions continued after the end of the October missile crisis, but Cubana's services were nonetheless fully restored, and were helped by the ongoing acquisition of Soviet-built aircraft.

Cubana's new Soviet-built fleet was accompanied by important cooperation agreements with Eastern bloc airlines. Cooperation with CSA Czechoslovak Airlines had already produced mutually beneficial results. In 1963, Cubana's cooperation made it possible for Aeroflot Soviet Airlines to establish 18-hour nonstop scheduled services between Moscow and Havana. These were the longest nonstop flights in the world, and the Tupolev 114 aircraft Aeroflot used were also the largest passenger aircraft in service at that time. Cubana provided Aeroflot with ground support and technical services, and representative offices in Havana and Cuba, for the nonstop Moscow-Havana route. Aeroflot, in turn, represented Cubana in the USSR. Later, cooperation with the East German airline Interflug made it possible for this carrier to establish its first-ever scheduled transatlantic service, linking East Berlin with Havana. Cooperative agreements (without direct flights) were also established with Malev (Hungarian Airlines), LOT Polish Airlines, and Tarom (Romanian Air Transport). These and other cooperation agreements supported Cubana's technical capabilities and led to mutual accords involving representative offices, passenger services and aircraft maintenance.

Later on, with the arrival of the Ilyushin IL-62 jets in the late 1960s, Cubana was able to replace its Britannias and start all-jet service to Europe on its already existing routes to Madrid and Prague (via Gander, Canada). A fleet of Tupolev TU-154, Ilyushin IL-76, Yakovlev YAK-40 and YAK-42 jets, and the more advanced Ilyushin IL-62M, followed in the 1970s for the airline's transatlantic, Latin American, Caribbean, and domestic services. The acquisition of this large and diverse fleet was financed by the Soviet Union and carried very favorable terms, such as repayment through general barter trade in place of hard currency. As a result, Cubana became the Latin American carrier with most experience in the operation of Soviet-built aircraft.

The agreements with Eastern bloc airlines and nations also allowed Cubana to fulfill an important strategic role for the Cuban government. Since the early 1960s, numerous aspiring revolutionaries from Latin America travelled to Cuba for education, training, medical care and conferences. They usually travelled on Cubana's flights from Prague, and in some cases also used the airline's occasional special flights to Eastern bloc cities. This long roundabout became important when almost all Latin American nations severed relations with Cuba, mostly in response to U.S. pressures. By the mid-1960s, only Mexico had diplomatic relations with Cuba, and Cubana's Mexico City service provided the only flights to Latin America. The Mexico City flights were closely monitored by the CIA, however, making it difficult for individuals who travelled to Cuba to avoid being targeted (and potentially submitted to arrest, torture or death when they returned to their home countries). Through its transatlantic flights to Prague and other Eastern bloc cities, Cubana therefore helped fulfill a significant element of the Cuban government's foreign relations strategy. Later, throughout the late 1960s and 1970s, numerous African revolutionaries would also use Cubana's services from Eastern bloc nations, to travel to Cuba and avoid being targeted by the CIA and Western intelligence services (although the Gander stop, necessary because of the Britannias' and IL-62s' limited range, did pose some challenges).

=== 1970s and 1980s ===
In 1975, Cubana's Bristol Britannias were pressed into service to ferry elite Cuban military units to Angola, as part of Operation Carlota. The Britannias were modified (with additional fuel tanks placed inside the passenger cabins) by Cubana's technicians, to allow non-stop flights from Cuba to Africa (with a reduced passenger load). This occurred when the U.S. government started to pressure Barbados to cancel Cubana's landing rights for those flights. Modifications to the Britannias included providing access to the cargo bay from the passenger cabins, to facilitate the rapid deployment of weapons and ammunition upon arrival. Nobel Prize winning author Gabriel García Márquez wrote articles in 1977 (and a book) that included narrations about Cubana's Britannias and its pilots flying the first contingent of elite Cuban troops to Angola. The route for those very urgent flights often involved a brief stop at Brazzaville for refueling and information on developments in Luanda. Arrivals in Brazzaville and Luanda were scheduled for nighttime, and the aircraft's exterior and interior lights were turned off before landing, on the ground, and during takeoff to avoid attracting attention. The initial flights were undertaken in secrecy, and helped prevent apartheid South Africa's army from occupying Luanda when Angola gained independence. In all, Cubana's Britannias performed over 100 flights between Cuba and Angola during several months, as part of Operation Carlota. Because spare parts were no longer made or marketed, Cubana's technicians had to manufacture them, and brake parts from Ilyushin IL-18 aircraft were adapted to fit the Britannias. Maintenance time was reduced by half to keep the aircraft operating continuously, despite the lack of weather reports along the sparsely travelled route. Each flight carried two pilot crews, taking turns at the controls, but pilots often flew beyond their flight-time limits. Shortly after this operation, Cubana established scheduled services between Havana and Luanda. Cubana's Britannias served in the airline's fleet for over three decades (they were retired in 1990), and never experienced any accident.

In the mid-1970s, Cubana leased Douglas DC-8-43 aircraft (previously in service with Air Canada) for its Canadian, Caribbean and Guyana services. These aircraft were leased with support from the Canadian government, as part of bilateral trade agreements between Canada and Cuba. Canadian Prime Minister Pierre Elliott Trudeau had spearheaded this initiative himself, seeking to strengthen relations between Canada and Cuba. As a result, the Canadian government, and Mr. Trudeau himself, came under intense pressure from the U.S. government, which disapproved of this initiative and sought to stop it. The DC-8 leases allowed Cubana to gain experience operating U.S.-built jets and made up for delays in deliveries of Soviet-built aircraft. One of the DC-8s (CU-T1200) was damaged in an accident (a mid-air collision with a smaller aircraft) during a test flight, with no loss of life, but a second DC-8 (CU-T1201) was lost when bombs exploded during an international flight in 1976, resulting in numerous fatalities. The explosions occurred shortly after takeoff from Barbados, whose government had been pressured earlier by the U.S. to cancel Cubana's landing rights. Among the many fatalities was a group of 24 athletes, mostly teenagers, from one of Cuba's sports teams. The Cuban government decried the explosions as sabotage, perpetrated by CIA-trained individuals who sought to damage the airline and terrorize passengers who would fly with Cubana. As a result, Cubana was forced to screen all passengers and luggage carefully before boarding, requiring lengthy advance check-in times and individual security checks as routine precautions in all flights. The leases for the DC-8s were terminated in the late 1970s, as a result of the losses. Except for the Britannias, the DC-8s were the only Western-built aircraft Cubana operated during the 1970s.

In 1978 the Carter administration, despite the continuing U.S. embargo, decided to open a U.S. interests section in Havana, to aid family reunions and visits of U.S. residents to families in Cuba. The U.S. had unilaterally broken diplomatic relations with Cuba in January 1961, and there had been no direct U.S. diplomatic representation whatsoever in Havana since that time (Cuba had not been allowed to have any diplomatic representation in U.S. territory since then, except for its U.N. mission). Although not an embassy in the formal sense, this diplomatic initiative nonetheless allowed Cubana to operate regular charter flights between Havana and Miami. No regular flights between Cuba and the U.S. had been allowed by the U.S. government since the 1960s, and U.S. airlines had since been banned from serving Cuba by the embargo. Cubana's charter flights to Miami were abruptly cancelled, however, by the Reagan administration shortly after it took office in 1981. Despite the Carter administration's initiative, provocations and sabotage against Cubana's operations continued all along, with actual and attempted bombings of Cubana's offices in Canada, Latin America and Europe (Cubana was not allowed to open any offices in the U.S. for the charter flights). Armed groups in the U.S., trained in sabotage and explosives, often issued public threats against Cubana. U.S. travel agencies that arranged Cubana's charter flights were also targeted with bombings, arson and other sabotage. (Note: Attacks against travel agencies that arrange family visits and other legal travel to Cuba have continued sporadically.) Such acts followed a pattern that started in 1960 and that targeted Cubana's offices in numerous nations, seeking to terrorize the airline's staff and passengers, and to obstruct its operations. The groups that claimed responsibility for those acts were led by individuals who had been CIA-trained or previously had ties to that intelligence agency.

By the late 1970s and early 1980s, Cubana flew scheduled services to Eastern and Western Europe (Prague, East Berlin, Moscow, Madrid, Paris, Lisbon), Sub-Saharan Africa (Luanda, Guinea-Bissau, Cabo Verde), Asia (Baghdad), North Africa (Tripoli), Canada (Montreal, Toronto, Gander), and to various Latin American and Caribbean destinations (Mexico City, Panama, Managua, Lima, Kingston, Barbados, Port of Spain, Georgetown). A route to Vietnam was under consideration at that time but was never started. The Baghdad route, in particular, made Cubana the first Latin American airline to serve Asia (this route was discontinued in the early 1980s).

During the 1970s and 1980s, Cubana served as general representative in Cuba for various Western airlines, such as Swissair, Sabena, Lufthansa and TAP. Mostly, these were airlines that did not serve Cuba but needed representation due to increasing travel of citizens from their home countries to Cuba. In addition, Cubana represented several African carriers in Cuba, such as TAAG, LAM, TACV (Cabo Verde) and LIA (Guinea-Bissau). Cubana also continued to represent Aeroflot Soviet Airlines, CSA Czechoslovak Airlines, Interflug, Malev Hungarian Airlines, LOT Polish Airlines and TAROM Romanian Air Transport.

In the early 1980s, Cubana ceded one of its IL-62 jets to Angola's national airline, TAAG, so that it could start its own scheduled flights on the Luanda-Havana route, in cooperation with Cubana's services on that route. This enabled TAAG to operate its first-ever transatlantic service. Some of Cubana's crews and technicians also helped TAAG sustain its services in Angola and Africa during the late 1970s and early 1980s. In most cases, Cubana's crews had to operate multiple types of aircraft to sustain flights, using both Western- and Soviet-built airplanes. This helped Angola to keep its national airline operating when civil war started, as factions supported by the apartheid South African regime, the CIA, and Zaire's Mobutu Sese Seko fought to gain control of the nation and its resources.

Most of the international services noted above were sustained through the decade of the 1980s. Cubana's international flights mostly carried diplomats, government officials, sports delegations, scholarship students, cultural exchange delegations, Cuban medical personnel on aid missions, military personnel, and visitors to official events in Cuba. Most international destinations were served once or twice per week. As the Cuban government began to make tourism a priority in the mid-1980s, however, Cubana's international flights started to cater more to this growing segment of travellers to Cuba. Then, the collapse of the Soviet bloc by the end of the 1980s, and the Soviet Union's own dissolution in 1991, would have a major impact on the airline's operations.

=== Post-Cold War era ===
With the collapse of the Eastern bloc, Cubana faced the formidable challenges of improving passenger services, revamping its technical capabilities, and restructuring its fleet. Any one of those challenges would have been a daunting undertaking for any major Western airline. Cubana had to face all of them at the same time, with great urgency, along with the continuing U.S. embargo on Cuba (which prohibited sales of U.S.-made aircraft and components). Despite the immense difficulties it faced, Cubana managed to sustain and expand its services throughout the 1990s. Cuba's rapidly growing tourism sector also helped the airline, providing much needed traffic.

Cubana had received it last three completely new IL-62Ms in late 1990 (CU-T1282) and early 1991 (CU-T1283 and 1284), from the Kazan, USSR, factory that manufactured these aircraft. Two other, also new, IL-62Ms had been delivered in 1988 and 1989. Cubana was therefore able to keep most of these aircraft in service long after the USSR's dissolution (in 1991) and the end of all IL-62M production in the mid-1990s. Its long experience with these aircraft made it possible to keep them flying, to sustain some of its long- and medium-range routes in the 1990s and beyond (Cubana's last IL-62M in regularly scheduled service was retired in 2011).

The U.S. government's long-standing quest to damage Cubana continued in the 1990s, beyond the restrictions imposed by the embargo (in effect since 1962), by prohibiting all flights over U.S. territory, despite the fact that the airline was not allowed to serve the U.S. at all. The prohibition violated international commercial aviation accords. Many U.S. aircraft overflew Cuba every day, on flights between the U.S. and Latin America or the Caribbean, yet the Cuban government did not pursue any retaliation against U.S. carriers or aircraft. Cubana's affected routes were those between Cuba and Canada, which at the time carried a significant amount of tourist traffic. Cubana was therefore forced to take long and very costly detours on all flights between Canada (Montreal, Toronto) and Cuba, to avoid overflying the U.S. A complaint to the International Civil Aviation Organization (ICAO) and an upgrade of aircraft flying the Canada routes with costly new communications equipment ended this blockage, despite the fact that most aircraft operating within the U.S. at that time were not required to have similar equipment (or had less advanced equipment than Cubana). This action by the U.S. government placed additional financial and technical strains on Cubana, at a time when the airline was in a very vulnerable situation, facing challenges that could have easily grounded any Western carrier.

Efforts were made to improve operations in the mid-1990s by leasing Western-built aircraft. This helped the airline to compete for passengers in Western Europe, Latin America, and Canada. Western-built aircraft were leased for limited periods of time, to supplement Cubana's Soviet-built jets. Long-range McDonnell Douglas DC-10-30 wide-bodies were leased from the French airline Air Outre Mer (AOM) in the 1990s, and medium-range Airbus A320 aircraft from various companies, despite pressures by the U.S. government to rescind or prevent leases. The French airline AOM, in particular, was threatened by the U.S. with cancellation of landing rights, when it entered into its lease and code-sharing agreements with Cubana. An intervention by the French government was required to prevent AOM from being severely damaged by those threats and any resulting U.S. actions. These and other unilateral pressures were unprecedented in the history of commercial aviation, and they were part of the U.S. government's longstanding efforts to damage Cubana and the Cuban economy.

In the mid-1990s, Cubana also acquired several Fokker F-27 turboprops from Iberia Airlines of Spain, as well as Sud Aviation ATR 42 turboprop aircraft to sustain its short-range routes. For some short-range routes in the Caribbean and within Cuba, the regional airline AeroCaribbean was enlisted to support Cubana's operations, offering connection and code-sharing services. Cubana also leased wide-body aircraft, such as Airbus A330 and Boeing 767, for limited periods of time from various European companies to support its transatlantic, North American and Latin American services, given Cuba's rapidly growing tourism sector. Cubana's most experienced crews were trained in the operation of all of these aircraft, and the airline also undertook their technical maintenance.

With the introduction of the Web in the middle 1990s, Cubana faced a new and unexpected challenge from the U.S. Anonymous U.S.-based individuals and groups (often using multiple online pseudonyms, false identities, and claiming to have been Cubana passengers) started systematically and regularly flooding travel-related websites, online forums and blogs with negative comments and false statements about Cubana's services and aircraft. Travel websites, forums and blogs based in numerous nations are usually targeted, especially those served by Cubana. Also, events that typically go unnoticed when they happen in U.S. airlines are falsely exaggerated and distorted sensationally in travel-related blogs and forums, when they occur in Cubana flights. When Cubana opened its own website, it was faced with denial-of-service attacks by U.S.-based hackers that frequently closed all access to the site. These and other frequent hacking attacks prevented Cubana from setting up online payment channels for reservations and ticketing, causing additional difficulties and losses for the airline. An additional, related problem in this area was the (still in effect) U.S. embargo's total prohibition of any payments to Cubana (and Cuba-based enterprises) with U.S.-based credit or debit cards, bank transfers (electronic or otherwise), and travellers' cheques, all of which greatly complicated setting up any online payment process for the airline. These U.S.-based efforts expanded the U.S. government's longstanding record of damaging the airline by multiple means, that had started with the cancellation of landing rights in the early 1960s, followed by the imposition of the U.S. embargo on Cuba (in 1962), along with many other actions and measures over the years.

In the 1990s, using Western-built aircraft and also its Soviet-built fleet, Cubana established new routes to western Europe and Latin America, to cater to Cuba's rapidly growing tourism industry. Cubana's 1990s routes included regularly scheduled services to:

- Europe: Geneva, London, Manchester, Rome, Milan, Copenhagen, Brussels, Frankfurt, Berlin, Barcelona, Las Palmas, Vitoria, Santiago de Compostela.
- South America: São Paulo, Rio de Janeiro, Buenos Aires, Santiago de Chile, Bogotá, Caracas, Mendoza, Córdoba, Quito, Guayaquil, Montevideo.
- Central America: Guatemala City, San José de Costa Rica.
- Caribbean: Santo Domingo, St. Maarten, Montego Bay, Fort de France, Nassau, Grand Cayman, Pointe a Pitre.
- North America: Mexico City, Cancún, Montreal, Toronto.

In the 1990s Cubana also undertook many special flights involving humanitarian missions, despite all the operational difficulties it faced. For example, when in 1998 the hurricanes Georges and Mitch caused severe damage in Central America and the Caribbean, Cubana flew medical brigades and provisions to the affected nations. The airline also flew sports delegations from Cuba and other Caribbean nations to international competitions around the world. Cubana became the prime carrier for Cuba's medical missions, which operate in over 100 nations and are typically contracted by countries and governments with difficult health problems. Cubana's services are also important to diplomatic missions in Havana, which housed over 180 embassies and legations by the end of the 1990s (more than in any other Latin American capital). Cubana's strategic importance to Cuba's foreign relations and to its tourism industry was well understood by the Cuban government. As a result, considerable efforts were devoted to renovate the airline's fleet and its technical capabilities.

=== Renovation ===
After the 1990s, Cubana faced the need to replace its Soviet-built aircraft, to improve its competitiveness with other airlines serving Cuba. Its management therefore made plans to renovate the airline's fleet, and in late 2005 Cubana received its first new long-range Ilyushin IL-96-300 (CU-T1250) wide-body jet from Russia, to replace some of the leased Western-built wide-bodies and its Soviet-era aircraft. Other IL-96-300s were delivered later, making it possible for the airline to reduce its leased, long-range Western-built fleet. New medium-range Russian Tupolev TU-204-100E and 100EC jets (passenger and cargo versions) were also ordered and started to be delivered in 2007. The new IL-96 and TU-204 jets were financed with the assistance of the Russian government.

Cubana refurbished some of its Ilyushin IL-62M aircraft in the early 2000s (decade), to continue using them in some of its international routes. The refurbished IL-62M aircraft were used in some of Cubana's flights within Latin America and for special flights to Africa. Restrictions imposed by the U.S. embargo on the sale of American-built aircraft and components (such as engines and avionics) also made it necessary for Cubana to keep the IL-62Ms in service, along with some Soviet-built aircraft in its domestic and short-range routes. Its newest IL-62M (CU-T1284) was received from the Ilyushin factory (in Kazan, USSR) in early 1991, shortly before the dissolution of the Soviet Union (two other new IL-62Ms were received in 1990). In all, Cubana had over four decades of experience with IL-62 and IL-62M aircraft, longer than any other airline in the world. Its IL-62s and IL-62Ms were also used for official government travel to many nations, including several round-the-world trips. Only one of Cubana's IL-62s (an IL-62M, CU-T1281) was ever lost in an accident, and this was due to a severe weather effect (wind-shear during take off, in 1989, long before this kind of weather problem attracted attention and remedial measures). All of Cubana's IL-62Ms were retired from regularly scheduled services in 2011.

Cubana's long-term renovation strategy is based on the purchase of new Russian-built aircraft. An important factor seems to be the financing provided by the Russian government, which sees Latin America as a potentially promising market for some of the new-generation Russian aircraft. The efficiency and performance of the most modern Russian aircraft, such as the IL-96 and TU-204, compare favorably with aircraft built by Airbus and Boeing. Also, the performance, purchase price and maintenance requirements of new-generation Russian jet engines, such as the Pavel Soloviev/Aviadvigatel PS-90A, compare favorably with Western-built engines, such as those manufactured by Pratt and Whitney, General Electric and Rolls Royce. The much lower purchase price of Russian aircraft makes them attractive to government-owned airlines such as Cubana, and the airline's longstanding experience with Soviet and Russian-built aircraft is also a favorable factor. Cubana is, after all, the most experienced operator of Soviet- and Russian-built aircraft in the Americas.

As part of its renovation strategy, Cubana sought to upgrade its technical support capabilities. The airline established a joint venture company with Iberia Airlines of Spain in 2004, to maintain and overhaul Western-built aircraft, including all Airbus and Boeing models. Technical facilities are located in Havana and other Cuban cities served by foreign carriers. The joint venture company, IBECA (incorporating Iberia's and Cubana's initials), is partly owned by Cubana. It has contracted with various airlines flying to Cuba to provide maintenance and technical support. Expertise gained through this venture are likely to help Cubana's technical capabilities with its new Russian aircraft, since they share many features with Western-built airplanes.

In 2004, Cuba and China signed an aviation accord, thus opening the possibility for Cubana to eventually operate direct flights between Havana and Beijing or Shanghai. Those flights, when started, would most likely make an intermediate stop (possibly in Canada). The General Administration of Civil Aviation of China held talks with Cuban officials before the signing of the accord, and expressed the possibility that a Chinese carrier, such as Air China or China Eastern would start services to Cuba, in coordination with Cubana. Cuba has had long-standing cultural, commercial and diplomatic ties with China, that started in the mid-19th century with significant Chinese emigration to Cuba. The possibility of opening a route to China seems feasible for Cubana, given its experience with long-range flights and routes, the substantial commercial ties between Cuba and China, the long-standing cultural heritage of Chinese emigration to Cuba, and growing Chinese interest in the Caribbean and Latin America.

During the August 2007 MAKS Airshow Cubana signed a $150 million contract for the purchase and confirmation of additional Tupolev TU-204s and new Antonov AN-148 aircraft. Th Antonov-148 purchase, in particular, will make Cubana one of this aircraft's launch customers. These new-generation Russian aircraft will allow Cubana to expand its services throughout the Caribbean and Latin America, and to upgrade its domestic routes. As Russian-built aircraft attract increasing interest from Latin America, Cubana stands to become an important source of technical support and demonstration for airlines that may lease or purchase them.

Cubana's renovation efforts are also related to the airline's strategic importance for the Cuban government and its foreign relations. Cubana's aircraft are typically used by high-level Cuban government officials on trips abroad. Also, Cubana's pilots and technicians have typically served in the Cuban air force, and are experienced in the operation and maintenance of multiple types of aircraft. Most of Cubana's flight attendants have medical training or experience, making it possible to deal with health emergencies on board. In this respect, the airline benefits from Cuba's very large per capita number of medical doctors and health personnel (one of the highest in the world), and is able to market its services in the growing area of medical tourism. The large and increasing number of tourists who visit Cuba for medical treatment makes this a promising market for Cubana in the future. Cuba's growing tourism sector, the large number of tourist sites and their diverse attractions, also make it a very promising market for Cubana. Cuba's well-developed airport infrastructure, with 10 international airports capable of serving wide-body aircraft and long-range flights, makes it possible for Cubana to expand its international services to new destinations and markets.

A major question for Cubana's future is the continuation of the U.S. embargo on Cuba. The embargo, imposed in February 1962 (a partial one started in October 1960), is the longest-running one in history and has been consistently and continuously condemned (annually) by the United Nations for several decades. Cuba now receives millions of visitors every year and stands to become one of the most important tourist destinations in Latin America, despite the embargo's efforts to isolate it, and to damage Cubana and all other Cuba-based airlines. The embargo and other U.S. actions have done considerable damage to Cubana over the years, involving direct or indirect destruction of aircraft by U.S. aerial bombing raids, acts of sabotage, hijackings, bombings, arson, cancellations of landing rights, obstruction of services, freezing of financial assets, deaths of staff and passengers, and numerous other acts (by the U.S. government or by U.S.-based parties, or both). Most such acts have violated international laws and international commercial aviation agreements, as well as national sovereignty rights, and some can easily be classified as undeclared acts of war or of terrorism. Cubana clearly stands to seek much compensation from the U.S. when the embargo ends. The amounts to be sought, compounded over time, are likely to be quite substantial.

== See also ==
- List of Cuba-US aircraft hijackings

== Footnotes ==
=== Bibliography ===
- Aeroguía Cubana magazine, volume 1, issues 1–9 (March–November 1954).
- AeroTransport Data Bank, Cubana fleet data, website www.aerotransport.org.
- Aerovías Q timetable, undated, c. 1958.
- Biographical notes on aviators: Agustín Parlá, website www.earlyaviators.com/eparla.htm; Domingo Rosillo, website www.rcooper.0catch.com/erosillo.htm.
- Britannia Aircraft Preservation Trust, website www.britannia.flyer.co.uk.
- Ceskoslovenske Aerolinie (CSA) timetable, April 1962.
- Cuba Aéreo, Breve Historia de la Aviación Cubana, https://web.archive.org/web/20071013181532/http://www.cubaaereo.com/pilot.asp?pg=historia.
- Cuban Tourist Commission, Cuba magazine, 1959.
- Cubana Airlines: Pioneer in World Aviation brochure, undated (c. 1958).
- Cubana Courier newspaper, volume 1, various issues, 1957.
- Cubana de Aviación timetables, November 1, 1945; January 1, 1946; March 1948; April 1948; May 1948; May 1953; May 1, 1955; September 16, 1955; December 1, 1955; September 1, 1957; June 1958; Summer 1961; December 1, 1965; June 1968; April 1, 1986; May 1, 1990; Summer 2006.
- García Dulzaides, Aurelio, Álbum Azul de Cuba, Rex Press, Miami, 1965.
- García Márquez, Gabriel, Operación Carlota, Mosca Azul, Lima, 1977.
- Gómez Fariñas, George, "Una tragedia cubana, 40 años después", El Nuevo Herald, December 15, 1992, p. 1C.
- Martí, Julio, "75 primaveras en alturas", Sol y Son magazine, November 15, 2004, website www.solysonmagazine.com.
- Martínez Menocal, Luis, Historias de la Aviación Cubana, Editora Política, Havana, 2009.
- Pan American Union, Cuba, Washington, D.C., 1943.
- Reed, Ted and Mimi Whitefield, "Cuba improves fleet with Western planes", Miami Herald, February 6, 1994, p. 22A.
- Revolución newspaper, volumes 1, 2 and 3, various issues, 1959, 1960, 1961.
- Rodríguez, Jorge L. and Diana Rodríguez, En Alas Cubanas, book (416 pages) available through website www.cubaaereo.com.
- Time magazine, "Flight 482 Is Missing", November 17, 1958.
- Time magazine, "Red All The Way", October 10, 1960.
- Vickers Viscount Network, website www.vickersviscount.net.
