= Juan Touzón =

Spanish lawyer and sports leader (1898–1972)

- Born: Juan Touzón Jurjo; 7 May 1898; Madrid, Spain
- Died: 13 August 1972 (aged 74); Madrid, Spain
- Citizenship: Spanish
- Occupations: Lawyer; Sports leader; Football manager
- Known for: President of the Spanish Football Federation

16th President of Atlético Madrid
- In office 1946–1947
- Preceded by: Manuel Gallego
- Succeeded by: Cesáreo Galíndez

16th President of RFEF
- In office March 1954 – 1956
- Preceded by: Sancho Dávila
- Succeeded by: Alfonso de la Fuente
Association football career
Managerial career
- Years: Team
- 1955: Spain (1)

Juan Touzón Jurjo (7 May 1898 – 13 August 1972) was a Spanish lawyer and sports leader who served as the 16th president of both Atlético Madrid between 1946 and 1947, and of the Spanish Football Federation between 1954 and 1956, during which period he even managed an international match as a coach.

== Professional career ==
Born in Madrid, Touzón was a lawyer, deputy director of the Banco de Vizcaya, and an honorary member of the Madrid Press Association.

== Sporting career ==
=== Atlético Madrid ===
Linked to Atlético Madrid since he was a child, Touzón was part of several boards of the club as a director, carrying out various efforts, such as the merger with the Club Aviación Nacional, and the purchase of the Metropolitan Stadium, which made the club's rehabilitation possible after being badly damaged in the Spanish Civil War.

On 15 January 1946, Touzón was elected the 16th president of the club, then called Club Atlético Aviación, and under his brief mandate he eliminated military symbols from the entity, when on 14 December, the club decided to drop the military association from its name, erasing the term "aviación" to became Atlético again before settling on its current name, Club Atlético de Madrid, as it is known today. During his mandate, the club's handball section, which went on to achieve many sporting successes, was also founded. He held the presidency for 18 months until July 1947, when he was replaced by Cesáreo Galíndez.

=== Spanish Football Federation ===
After leaving the presidency of Atlético Madrid, Touzón continued to be linked to the world of football, occupying various positions within the Spanish Federation until becoming its president in March 1954. Being vice president of this organization in April 1952, he made a trip to Galicia to materialize Federation aid to the modest football of Vigo, and Touzón declared that he feels very proud of the initiative as a Galician that he is, stating "Well, I was born in Lugo"; however, the statement remains in the air, without modifying his condition as a Madrid native.

In his functions as president, Touzón had the task of heading the Selection Committee of the Spain national team, a quadrumvir made up of himself, José Luis del Valle, Emilio Jiménez, and Pablo Hernández, so in the absence of a permanent national coach, he provisionally served as such in a 3–0 victorious match over Switzerland in Geneva on 19 June 1955, which means that he boasts a 100 percent victory record as the national team coach. At the end of the meeting, the Spanish delegation receives a tribute from the Swiss delegation at the Beau Rivage Hotel. At the event, the Spanish president was bestowed the gold sash, a Swiss decoration that recognizes the greatest men of international football.

In 1956, Touzón appointed José Páramo Fernández, treasurer of the Galician Football Federation. He held the presidency for two years until 1956, when he was replaced by Alfonso de la Fuente, although he continued to be its director.

== Personal life ==
Touzón goes very frequently to Lugo, for health reasons, and to Monforte de Lemos, where his relatives, the Rodríguez Otero Touzón, have a house on the banks of the Cabe. Touzón had three children Emilia, María, and Juan Antonio.

== Death ==
Juanito Touzón, as he was affectionately known in all the sports media in the country died at his home in Madrid on 13 August 1972, at the age of 74. His death has caused deep regret, because during his life he knew how to gain the friendship and affection of all who knew and treated him. His funeral was held on the following day and telegrams of condolence from some federations and clubs in Spain arrived at his home. In November, a special religious ceremony in his honor was held two days later, in the parish church of Nuestra Señora de la Paloma.
