= Álvaro de Aguilar =

Spanish diplomatic and sports leader

- Born: Álvaro de Aguilar y Gómez-Acebo; 28 December 1892; Madrid, Spain
- Died: 22 February 1974 (aged 81); Madrid, Spain
- Citizenship: Spanish
- Occupations: Sports leader; Diplomatic
- Known for: President of the President of Atlético Madrid

Secretary of the Spanish Olympic Committee
- In office 1916–1919

6th President of Atlético Madrid
- In office April 1919 – 12 November 1920
- Preceded by: Julián Ruete
- Succeeded by: Julián Ruete

Álvaro de Aguilar y Gómez-Acebo (28 December 1892 – 22 February 1974) was a Spanish diplomatic and sports leader who is best known for being the secretary of the Spanish Olympic Committee between 1916 and 1919 and the sixth president of Atlético Madrid between 1919 and 1920.

== Early life and education ==
Álvaro de Aguilar was born on 28 December 1892 in Madrid, as the third son of Alfonso de Aguilar y Pereira (1858–1928), the first Count of Aguilar, and Manuela Gómez-Acebo y Cortina, paternal great-aunt of Margarita Saxe-Coburg-Gotha.

In 1921, he married Montserrat Castro y Lombillo, who has been described as "arrogant in figure", being sponsored by the bride's mother and the groom's father, Count of Aguilar. The couple had at least four children Paloma, África, Carmen, and Cayetano de Aguilar y Castro.

== Sporting career ==
De Aguilar was a tennis and field hockey player, winning several Spanish Championships of the latter with Athletic. In April 1919, when Julián Ruete resigned from the presidency of Atlético Madrid, de Aguilar was chosen to replace him. His mandate only lasted for one season because in 1920, he resigned upon being transferred to the Spanish Embassy in Belgium, from which he collaborated in the organization of the 1920 Olympic Games in Antwerp. At the opening ceremony of the 1920 Games, he paraded alongside Jaime Garcia Alsina, president of the Catalan Olympic Committee, and Gonzalo Figueroa y Torres, president of the Spanish Olympic Committee, in which he had worked as its secretary between 1916 and 1919.

Later he would have various appointments in the diplomatic corps, including in 1936 as an Ambassador of Spain to the Republic of Ireland.

== Later life ==
On 1 April 1962, de Aguilar was granted the Order Civil of Agricultural Merit, with the category of Commander. He died in Madrid on 22 February 1974, at the age of 81.
