= Juan Estefanía =

Spanish businessman and sports leader (1884–1943)

8th President of Atlético Madrid
- In office 1923–1926
- Preceded by: Julián Ruete
- Succeeded by: Luciano Urquijo

16th President of Recreativo de Huelva
- In office 1940–1941
- Preceded by: Arturo López Damas
- Succeeded by: Víctor Revilla Alonso

Personal details
- Born: Juan Estefanía Mendicute; 1884; Bilbao, Biscay, Spain
- Died: 4 December 1943 (aged 58–59); Huelva, Andalusia, Spain

Juan Estefanía Mendicute (1884 – 4 December 1943) was a Spanish businessman and sports leader, who served as the 8th president of Atlético Madrid from 1923 to 1926, and as the 16th president of Recreativo de Huelva from 1940 to 1941.

== Sporting career ==
Juan Estefanía was born in 1884 in the Biscayan town of Bilbao, where he presided over the Biscay Boxing Federation. In 1907, the 23-year-old Estefanía, then residing in Bilbao, was exempted from military service for family reasons. A few years later, he moved to Madrid, where he worked as manager of a coal company.

In 1923, Estefanía became president of Atlético Madrid (replacing Julián Ruete), a position that he held for three years, until 1926, when he was replaced by Luciano Urquijo. Under his leadership, the club made progress in drafting new statutes that eliminated all references to the club's Basque origins, thus finally separating it from Athletic Bilbao, to which it had been linked until then. On the field, Atlético won the 1925 Regional Championship and reached the final of the 1926 Copa del Rey, which ended in a 3–2 loss to FC Barcelona after extra-time.

In 1940, Estefanía became president of Recreativo de Huelva, then known as Onuba Football Club due to a heated conflict with the Andalusian Football Federation. Shortly after taking over, on 13 August, Estefanía took advantage of the decree Law of the Head of State that eradicated the use of foreign words to request and obtain from the Andalusian Federation the club's change of name to Club Recreativo Onuba. He held Recreativo's presidency for just a year, until 1941, when he was replaced by Víctor Revilla Alonso.

== Death ==
Estefanía died in Huelva on 4 December 1943, at the age of either 58 or 59.
