= Pedro Vives =

Spanish engineer, lawyer, and politician

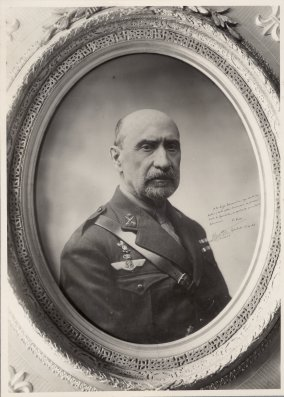
- Pedro Vives
- Born: Pedro Vives Vich; 20 January 1858; Igualada, Catalonia, Spain
- Died: 9 March 1938 (aged 80); Madrid, Spain
- Citizenship: Spanish
- Occupations: Engineer; Military men; Politician; Aerial observer
- Known for: Founder of Spanish aviation and Development Minister of Spain

Military governor of Cartagena
- In office 1922–1923
- Preceded by: Gonzalo de Saavedra y Cueto
- Succeeded by: Andrés Mellado

Minister of Development
- In office 1923–1925
- Preceded by: Manuel Portela Valladares
- Succeeded by: Rafael Benjumea y Burín

Pedro Vives Vich (20 January 1858 – 9 March 1938) was a Spanish military engineer, politician, and aerial observer, who was the main pioneer of Spanish ballooning and aviation, both military and civil. In 1896, Vives was made head of the Servicios de Aerostación ("Aerostation Services"), and at his suggestion, the army adopted the kite-type ballon and then had it built in Guadalajara. He was the first Spaniard to fly in an airplane in 1909. He served as the first Chief of the Spanish Air Force, which was founded in 1913 at his request.

He was also a publicist, and as such, he directed several technical studies, directed military works (in the Pyrenees, Lleida, Cuba, Morocco), including the First Melillan campaign in 1893. In Africa, he not only participated in war flights, but also created new aerodromes. He later became the military governor of Cartagena in 1922–23, and then as the Development Minister of Spain between 1923 and 1925. He left an enormous and multifaceted technical work for the beginning of Spanish aviation and for the modernization of the public works of the State.

== Early and education ==
Pedro Vives was born in Igualada, Catalonia, on 20 January 1858, as the son of Pedro Vives Ramón and Irene Vich Picornell. He was born into a family of small businessmen, owners of cotton spinning and weaving factories located in Igualada and Manresa. He was known as Pere familiarly, the Catalan version of his name. The Vives family took their three sons, Jaime, Francisco, and Pedro, to a boarding school in Manresa, run by the Jesuits, where they attended high school.

When Pedro finished school, he chose to become a military engineer, going to Guadalajara to prepare for the Academy of Engineers, which he entered in 1874. A very diligent student with impeccable conduct, he received his lieutenant's office four years later, in 1878, where he finished his degree as number 1 in his class. His first assignment was at the Las Vascongadas, in the Mining Sappers Regiment.

== Military career ==
=== First positions and stints in Paris, Cuba, and US ===
In May 1878, the general director of the Arma gave him a Service Commission for one month to visit the Universal Exhibition in Paris, where his interest in the advances in technology and science of his time led him to identify with its most modern achievements. Upon his return, Vives began his life as a sapper-miner, in the 4th Regiment in the Northern Army, where in addition to commanding troops and other jobs, he carried out fortification work (one of his specialties) on the Pyrenean and Aragonese borders (Canfranc and Jaca) and later he took care of defense work on the French border in Navarre. He was promoted to captain in 1880 and was assigned to Cartagena, where he stayed for a short time, as he was then assigned to Madrid and later to Barcelona.

In 1881, Vives volunteered for Cuba, serving in the Santa Clara Engineer Command, but he only remained there for three years due to being uncomfortable in garrison life. Before returning to Spain in 1884, he requested a six-month leave of absence to move to the United States, with the aim of perfecting his English, and expanding his technical and scientific knowledge in San Francisco, Chicago, Boston, and other cities; while there, he made his living as an engineer. In this country, he studied mechanical traction in trams, and as a result of this experience he published in the Memorial de Ingenieros (Memorial of Engineers) an article called "Trams moved by underground cables" which, due to its originality, aroused great expectation among technicians. He also participated in installing the Spanish pavilion at the 1884 Boston International Exposition, of the objectives that the Spanish Artillery contributed to the event.

=== Military works in Lleida, Cádiz, and Melilla (1884–1895) ===
After returning to Spain in 1884, Vives was assigned to the Lleida Engineer Command, which was one of the most fruitful stages of his professional activity. He studied the border area with France, focusing his attention on the Val d'Aran, where he intervened in the layout of the road from Viella to the French border, thoroughly studying the possibilities of constructing a tunnel as the only means of saving the Val d'Aran from the total isolation to which he was condemned during the winter. It was an enormous work that everyone considered a utopia; all except Vives, who years later held the position of Undersecretary of Development in the board of directors of General Primo de Rivera, and from that position, he promoted the work of the tunnel, six kilometers long, until it was completely drilled.

In 1887, for health reasons, he began to provide his services in the Campo de Gibraltar in the province of Cádiz, where in Tarifa, he designed the fortifications and sites to defend the Strait of Gibraltar. A year later, he was assigned to the Málaga Engineer Command, where he created and developed a military dovecote, which went on to play such an important role in communications with Melilla during the First Melillan campaign in 1893. For his work and participation in this campaign, he was awarded the Cross of Military Merit with a white badge.

== Pioneer of Spanish aviation ==
=== Aerostation Service in Guadalajara (1896–1901) ===
On 30 September 1896, a Royal Order from the Ministry of War created the Military Aerostation Service, established its headquarters in Guadalajara, and placed it under the command of Commander Pedro Vives Vich, who was called back to the Peninsula to take charge of it in October 1896, thus ending his first performance in Africa and beginning his destination to Guadalajara, where the Park will be located. In December 1896, the Aerostation Park was created in the Henares Maneuver Park, and on 15 January 1897, Vives took charge of the first material that this space would have, the so-called 'Yon system aerostatic train', to transfer it to Guadalajara. The Aerostation Park in Guadalajara was the first military air base in Spain, and began its flight operations in 1900.

The first objective that he imposed was the acquisition of the essential material to be able to begin aerostatic activities. Soon the officers, engineers-pilots who carried out the ascensions, built their own aerostats, generating what can be considered an artisanal self-construction industry, but none of the officers assigned to the ballooning unit had flight experience. To obtain the pilot's title and learn how aerial observation was applied in other armies, Commander Vives and Captain Tejera traveled to Paris on 1 June 1897 under an official commission, which also took him to cities in Germany, Austria, Italy, Switzerland, Belgium, and the Netherlands, where he studied the advances of military ballooning in those countries; these official commissions continued during the following years, 1899 and 1900. Upon returning from this trip, he wrote a report that made his superiors decide to implement the kite balloon as a matter of regulation, compared to the other option of the spherical balloon. During his travels through Europe, in Munich specifically, his first ascent in a captive balloon took place, Paris being the city where he carried out his first free ascent, completing the Paris-Fort de Vances route (thirteen kilometers). In another of his travels, this one to Bern in 1899, he traveled to Friedrichshafen to visit the facilities of Count Zeppelin, then dedicated to the construction of the LZ1 that would be raised the following year.

Vives continued with his eagerness for organization and established barracks, parks, and the Aerostation Polygon in Guadalajara, and after overcoming the difficulties that arose, on 1 December 1900, with the first kite-type balloon acquired from Germany, he finally carried out the first "free ascension" of Spanish Military Aeronautics. The crew was made up of Pedro Vives Vich and Captain Fernando Giménez Sáenz, they were followed on horseback towards Alcalá de Henares by the lieutenant of the ballooning company Alfredo Kindelán, who later stated that "the event was not an improvisation. Vives, a methodical and consistent man, did not trust improvisation at all. On the contrary, all his actions and decisions were the fruit of a mature and profound study". This impression is confirmed by the Royal Order of 1901, where the pleasure with which the King Alfonso XIII saw the intelligence and industriousness in the planning and development of the aerostatic service is expressed, on the occasion of the approved report of the Services during the year 1900. The ascensions continued and until June 1903, 24 free flights were made on the balloon named Mars, and 5 on Venus. In an ascension made by the Mars balloon on 25 October 1902, the crew members were prepared to test an idea from Vives, which consisted of a ballast bag tied to a 15-meter-long rope that would allow them to cushion the speed of descent, upon touching the ground and suddenly unloading the corresponding weight, which shows that Vives not only had the desire to fly, but also to experiment to provide solutions to the development of air navigation.

In 1903, Vives and his officers studied the possibility of building themselves the types of balloons they had in operation, that is, spherical and captive kite-type balloons, seeking greater economy in the acquisition of material. Thus in 1903, he took responsibility for the construction of balloons, with the first one completed being a kite type, with a little more volume than the German originals to achieve greater lift; it was given the name Alfonso. The next was the spherical Uranus that participated, along with Jupiter and Mars, in the observation of the solar eclipse on 30 August 1905. At his suggestion, the army adopted the kite-type ballon and then had it built in Guadalajara.

== International Congresses of Scientific Aeronautics (1902–1906) ==
At the beginning of 1902, Vives was the first head of the Aviation Army who, with little military hierarchy, since he was only a commander, convinced General Weyler, Minister of War, to create balloon observer officers and managed to have the first course held that year, which must be attended by one officer from each Corps of Engineers. Due to the Spanish Military Air Force being presented as a reality at the European level at the time, Spain was invited to participate in conferences on ballooning that were to be held in Berlin in May 1902, and Vives was appointed to represent the Ministry of War, and such was his participation that he was unanimously appointed member of the International Commission Permanent Scientific Aerostation. He thus took part in different international congresses of Scientific Aeronautics, such as Berlin in 1902, Peterburg in 1904, or Milan in 1906. In September 1902, his Aerostation Company carried out shooting observation experiences from a balloon at the Carabanchel camp for the first time in Spain, and the success achieved was such that the chief general of the Central Shooting School, who expressed his gratitude, stating that he admired "the scientific knowledge, experience, and military correctness that Lieutenant Colonel Vives has been able to instill in the unit he commands".

In 1902, Vives received a technical report from Leonardo Torres Quevedo about his airship project, a steerable aerostat of original design, in case it could be of interest to the Army, but Vives' response was skeptical since he considered that up to now none of those that had been built and tested had military application. However, he went to make the Aerostation Park workshops available to the inventor for the construction and testing of the airship. In 1906, tests were carried out with satisfactory results, but despite the success achieved and the enthusiasm of Torres Quevedo, Alfredo Kindelán, and Vives, the airship was never manufactured in Spain. In 1906 he was made vice-president of the International Aeronautical Society.

In the aforementioned congress of Saint Petersburg in 1904, it was agreed that simultaneous balloon ascensions would be carried out in several European cities, to study the influence of an eclipse on the atmosphere. To this end, on the day of the Solar eclipse of August 30, 1905, ascents were made from the Burgos Artillery Park, with Vives as pilot of the Jupiter, accompanied by Professor Berson and Doctor Romeo, who rose with the purpose of carrying out meteorological and spectroscopic observations of great scientific interest.

=== First Spaniard to fly in an airplane and first flight over Madrid (1908–1912) ===
On 2 March 1908, Vives, now a colonel, was assigned to the Cádiz Engineer Command and months later to Ceuta, where he resumed his unique skills as an Africanist and engineer, without abandoning his dream of aeronautical precursor. Likewise, despite his assignment to the command, he continued in the organization and regulation commission that he held in the aerostatic service. In January 1909, Colonel Vives and Captain Kindelán carried out a service commission in England, France, Germany, and Italy, to study airships and airplanes in their military applications. During this commission, in Germany, he had the opportunity to travel by airship, making three ascents. Also during this commission, while trying to fly an airplane at the school that the Wright brothers had established in Pau, he suffered an accident. Two months later, he returned to Paris to resume his interrupted studies on the Wright airplane and finally managed to fly in an airplane, thus becoming the first Spaniard to do so.

At the end of 1909, Vives and Kindelán issued a report in which they recommended the acquisition of an airship and an airplane for experimentation, but the Ministry of War decided to purchase the airship in France, from the Casa Astra workshops, and after numerous tests that were not very satisfactory, he moved to Guadalajara where the final tests ended up being carried out. On 4 May 1910, the airship already baptized with the name of España ("Spain"), crewed by Vives, Kindelán, and the mechanic Quesada, made a flight in which, for the first time, an airship crossed the sky of Madrid, thus introducing the dirigible to Spain. In September 1910, he was appointed director of the Academy of Engineers of Guadalajara, where he had finished his degree as number 1 in his class, and it was decided that, without prejudice to his destiny, he would continue to serve as head of the Aerostation Park and Service. In October 1910, a commission of chiefs and officers of the Aerostation service, chaired by Colonel Vives, left for Paris again to select the material necessary for airplane experimentation.

On 7 March 1911, the Regulations governing airplane experimentation were published, and Vives was put in charge of choosing the land to build the first military airfield and direct flight training. Cuatro Vientos thus became the first aerodrome of Spanish aeronautics, and in this field, starting on 15 March 1911, the first five students slowly began to assimilate the teachings of their instructors. In August 1912, Vives resigned from the Directorate of the Academy of Engineers to dedicate himself completely to Aeronautics. On 18 August, Vives received the baptism of blood by plane; when traveling as an observer in a "Bristol" airplane from Cuatro Vientos to Toledo, an engine failure caused the plane to descend and when landing it collided with a ditch in the ground, leaving the pilot unharmed and Vives slightly injured.

=== Head of the Military Aeronautics Service ===
In recognition of the effectiveness developed by the Cuatro Vientos School, whose study and instruction program had been drafted by Colonel Vives, as well as the first aerial reconnaissance mission, also ordered by Vives, it was created by Decree of 28 February 1913, the Military Aeronautics Service with two branches, Aerostation and Aviation. When the Regulations were published, Colonel Vives assumed an extraordinary volume of command, with his powers being those that corresponded to a head of the Corps and his responsibility was enormous, given the special modality of the service and the activity that took place at the airfields. In 1912, Vives and Kindelán became the first two heads of the Aeronautics service and the Aviation branch respectively, something that at that time was unimaginable since airplanes did not yet exist and the evolution of the nascent Spanish military ballooning was unpredictable.

Within the Spanish army he was the founder and first head of the Spanish Aeronautics and proposed that they adopt aviation as a weapon of war, flying to Granada to agree with the director of the Gunpowder Factory about the technical conditions that the aviation bombs must have. In 1912, in the war in Morocco, he organized for the first time in the world a bombardment from the air, and during this time he founded airfields in Spain and Morocco. For instance, when he was commissioned to Tétouan to learn the necessary elements to cooperate in the operations that were about to begin against the rebel group of Bni Arouss, he chose the Sania Ranel field, which was the first African airfield of Spanish Aeronautics, and which he prepared to be able to defeat the enemy zone of Larache.

By 1914, Vives represented the aerial vanguard of everything that happened in Aviation. The outbreak of the First World War in 1914 made it impossible to acquire material outside of Spain, which forced Vives to study a solution. With the support of public powers, he achieved the cooperation of the civil industry for the manufacture of aircraft, with him encouraging civil engineers to carry out technical studies aimed at providing national aircraft to Spanish Aviation. Thus, in 1915, he tried to achieve an airplane that would allow flights to continue in schools and squadrons in Africa; his plan, which he put into practice, began with the manufacture of a genuinely Spanish engine. In Barcelona, he forced the Hispano-Suiza automobile factory to design and develop an aviation engine, which obtained such a success that it was manufactured in a large series by the French subsidiary of Hispano-Suiza, and ended up playing a very prominent role in the war, but he still needed an aerial platform to mount, so he got the Cuatro Vientos aerodrome workshops to manufacture a prototype airplane ("Arrow") that would serve as a flying test bench for the Barcelona aeronautical engine.

In 1914, Colonel Vives began the negotiations to acquire the magnificent natural Tablada Aerodrome for the benefit of the infant military aviation; and in 1915, the Seville City Council ceded the hippodrome to the State for the construction of a military aerodrome. In 1915, Colonel Vives moved to Cartagena to choose the place where the first Spanish maritime aerodrome was to be established, the Los Alcázares Hydro Base, with a commission being appointed to travel to North America to choose the material that should be acquired to found a seaplane pilot school. Suddenly, he was removed from command of the aeronautics, leaving behind his management an indelible mark of creation and effectiveness. Immediately after his dismissal, he was appointed head of the General Command of Engineers of the IV Military Region, a position he took office on 19 October, and one that corresponded to the position of general, but he held it as a colonel with a higher rank.

In March 1917, for war merits, he was promoted to brigadier general, and was again assigned to the Peninsula, to take command of the General Command of Engineers of Zaragoza. When the Military Railway Service was created in 1920, General Vives was appointed its director. His work in this position, although brief, was fruitful. He established the foundation of an organization that remained unchanged until April 1931. In September, he joined his new position as inspector of the Engineering Services in Africa, and in this destination, one of the most active and fruitful stages of the general's life will take place.

In the territory of Melilla, when the Annual disaster occurred (July 21), there were no military railways, nor troops of this specialty, and furthermore, the scarce civil network remained in the power of the enemy. With all the speed that the available elements allowed, railway communications were reestablished until they were synchronized with the advance of the troops, using armored trains that provided excellent services. One can end this stage of his life by saying that the railroads, the roads, and the successes of military transmissions are due to him. The services provided by the Engineers in the Melilla Field were due to him.

Upon being promoted to major general in 1921, he was assigned to Cartagena as military governor. He remained in this position until mid-1923, when he was appointed head of the General Command of Melilla. General Vives once again has the Aviation Forces under his command. Between the years 1917 and 1923, Vives was living in Africa (Ceuta and Melilla), in Zaragoza and Cartagena, holding different military positions.

== Writing career ==
Vives was also a publicist, and as such, he directed several technical studies, directed military works (in the Pyrenees, Lleida, Cuba, Morocco), including the First Melillan campaign in 1893.

Between 1886 and 1935, Vives published 14 works of different types and themes, related to ballooning, aeronautics, meteorology, Igualada, Et cetera.

== Politic career ==
Bosch began his political career around 1873

== Personal life ==
On 20 January 1885, while still in Lérida, Vives married his girlfriend from his cadet years in Guadalajara: Inocencia Camino Molina, and the couple had eleven children were born and fifty years later they were able to celebrate their golden wedding in Madrid.

== Death ==
During the Spanish Civil War, Vives was in Madrid, and became a refugee in the Norwegian embassy, where he died on 9 March 1938, at the age of 80.

In his honor Igualada has held different events. In 1925 he was named the Favorite Son of the city of Igualada, and the street that until then had been called Rambla de Sant Pere Mártir was named Rambla General Vives. To commemorate the 100th anniversary of his birth, he erected a monument to him in Paseo Verdaguer. He has also inscribed his name on a tombstone in the Town Hall and named a Secondary School after him.
