= Julián Ruete =

Spanish footballer, manager, referee, and coach

5th and 7th President of Atlético Madrid
- In office 1912–1919
- Preceded by: Ramón de Cárdenas
- Succeeded by: Álvaro de Aguilar
- In office 1921–1923
- Preceded by: Álvaro de Aguilar
- Succeeded by: Juan Estefanía

Personal details
- Born: 29 January 1887 Madrid, Kingdom of Spain
- Died: 15 March 1939 (aged 52) Barcelona, Spain
Association football career
- Full name: Julián Ruete Muniesa
- Position: Midfielder
Senior career*
Years	Team	Apps	(Gls)
1904–1909	Madrid FC		
1909-10	Atlético Madrid		
1910-11	Athletic Bilbao	1	
Managerial career
- 1921–1922: Spain (4)
- * Club domestic league appearances and goals

Julián Ruete Muniesa (29 January 1887 – 15 March 1939) was a player, referee, coach and football manager in Spain at the beginning of the 20th century. He was also a director of the Royal Spanish Football Federation.

Some of his main achievements was getting the funds for the construction of a new ground for Athletic Madrid (now known as Atlético Madrid), the Campo de O'Donnell in 1913.

== Playing career ==
He was born at the beginning of 1887 in Madrid, a city in which he would develop an extensive career linked to football. Between 1904 and 1910 he was a player, member and secretary of the Board of Directors of the Madrid Football Club (now known as Real Madrid). His position was midfielder, but took no part in any of the club's four consecutive Copa del Rey final wins between 1905 and 1908, instead serving as captain of the reserve team. In 1910, he played for Athletic de Madrid. He also played for Athletic Bilbao, featuring in one Copa del Rey match in 1909 and another in 1911.

== Club presidency ==
In 1912, he was elected President of Athletic de Madrid for the first time, a position he held initially until 1919. During his tenure he oversaw the move to a new ground, the Campo de O'Donnell in 1913.

Two years after leaving the presidency, in 1921 he was elected again, remaining in office until 1923. In this second term, the club made very important advances such as the construction of a more advanced new stadium, the Estadio Metropolitano de Madrid, becoming independent from their original parent club Athletic Bilbao, and winning the Centro Championship for the first time in 1920-21, thus participating in the Copa del Rey for the first time, where they unexpectedly, but convincingly defeated Real Unión in the semi-finals, but then lost the final to their 'cousins' from Bilbao.

== Refereeing career ==
In addition to his relationship with Atlético Madrid, Ruete went much further in his relationship with the world of football. He was a football referee, being among the 5 men who established the College of Referees of the Central Regional Federation on 15 April 1914, which was the first College of Referees in Spain. Together with the likes of Manuel Prast and José Manuel Kindelán, Ruete was a member of the College's first constitution, serving as its first Secretary. However, he resigned from the position just a few weeks later, on 19 May, to become one of the first category referees.

As a referee, he oversaw the first game of the Prince of Asturias Cup, an official inter-regional football competition contested by the regional selections of Spain. The game was held at the Campo de O'Donnell on 10 May 1915, between the teams of Centro (a Castile/Madrid XI) and Catalonia, ending in a 2-1 win to the Catalans. He also refereed the final of the 1917 Prince of Asturias Cup between Madrid and Catalonia, this time ending in a controversial win to Madrid, because in the 70th minute, with the score already at 2-0, the Catalan side had a goal disallowed in the 70th minute for having scored directly from a corner kick, a circumstance not allowed at the time, and this event led Ruete to send off a visiting player due to the protests, to which the Catalan team left the match in protest.

== Coaching career ==
He also worked as a coach, training Atlético and Nacional and acting as technical secretary of Club Deportivo Castellón.

Between 1921 and 1922 he was the manager of the Spain national football team, leading the nation in four games that ended with victory.

== Death ==
He died in Barcelona in March 1939.
