= Tablada Nueva =

- Barrio
- Interactive map of Tablada Nueva
- Country: Paraguay
- Autonomous Capital District: Gran Asunción
- City: Asunción

Area
  - Total: 1.35 km^{2} (0.52 sq mi)
- Elevation: 43 m (141 ft)

Population
  - Total: 4,520

Tablada Nueva is a neighbourhood (barrio) of Asunción, Paraguay.
