= Tablada Aerodrome =

Sports venue in Seville (1880–1941)

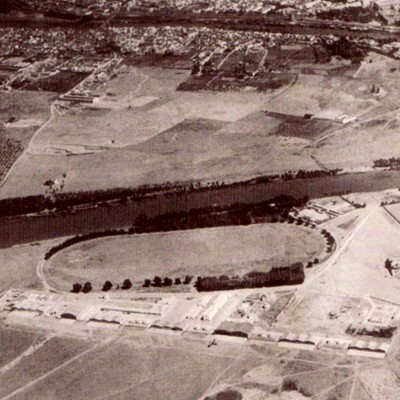
- Tablada hippodrome
- Location: Seville, Andalusia, Spain
- Capacity: 3,000

Construction
- Opened: 1880
- Demolished: 1941
- Cost: 3.000 pesetas

The Tablada Aerodrome, formerly known as the Tablada hippodrome, was a sports venue in the city of Seville, Spain. The venue was formed and reformed numerous times in its existence, being a historical fundamental piece in several categories such as Equestrianism (1880–89), serving as the home to the first horse races in the city, football (1890–1899), hosting the first match in Spanish football on 8 March 1890, recreation (1900–1909), and Aviation (1910–1941), such as the first military air raid.

== Early history ==
The immense plain of Tablada, located to the south of Seville, was owned by the City Council and was the place where the cattle used to supply meat for the city's markets and also where the inhabitants of the city could freely carry the cavalries and other livestock.

== Equestrianism ==
In the second half of the 19th century, however, its use was expanded to cover other types of activities: A pigeon shooting range was installed, and the Seville Horse Racing Society built a hippodrome on the banks of the Guadalquivir. The first horse races in Seville were organized in 1880 at the initiative of the Real Maestranza de Caballería, and they were held at the Tablada hippodrome, being equipped with grandstands for around 3,000 people. The usual thing was to organize two race sessions a week during the spring and autumn seasons, meaning the opening of the equestrian year in Spain, with famous events such as those known as Omnium de Sevilla and the City Council Prize were the races with the best financial endowment until 1889.

== Football ==
After the constitution of Sevilla FC on 25 January 1890, the facilities of the Tablada hippodrome became its first playing field, ad on 8 March 1890, it had the honor of hosting the very first football game in Spanish football between two official clubs in accordance with the rules of association football. Sevilla FC defeated Recreativo de Huelva by a score of 2–0. The Tablada hippodrome was thus one of the first football fields in the country.

== Recreation ==
Tablada also became a fundamental piece for the recreation of the Sevillians, including an endless number of recreational and sports activities on its grounds.

== Aviation ==
Aviation arrived at the meadow in 1910, when the Mayor of Seville, Antonio Halcón, organized the First Aviation Week in Tablada, with four pilots and their respective airplanes competing in speed, take-off, turns and permanence in the air. In 1913 the Tablada hippodrome was once again the scene of aerial exhibitions, when the French pilot Tixier made three 'sensational' flights aboard the 50 hp Bleriot monoplane, reaching a speed of 115 km/h. One year later, Colonel Vives, creator of the Spanish Aeronautics, began negotiations to acquire an aerodrome for the benefit of infant military aviation; and in 1915, the Seville City Council ceded the hippodrome to the State for the construction of a military aerodrome. Tablada became famous for events such as the first military air raid from Melilla to Canarias in 1924 and the flight of the Plus Ultra between Palos and Buenos Aires.

=== Decline and Collapse ===
The Tablada hippodrome remains active until 1931, and it seems to disappear in 1936–39 when it was absorbed by the extensions of the aerodrome. The Spanish Civil War also played a role in its decline and closure, and a new hippodrome began to be built in 1941. As of 2025, it is completely abandoned.
