= Mariano Barberán =

Spanish military aviator

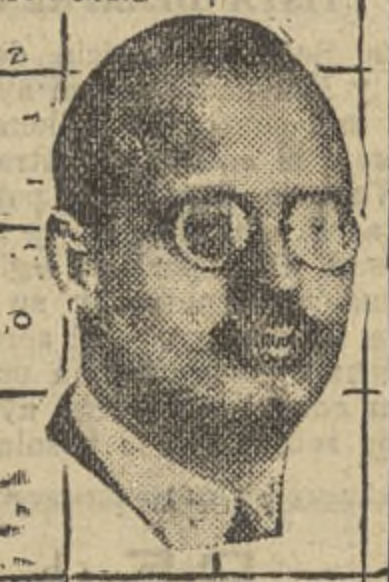
- Born: Mariano Barberán y Tros de Ilarduya; 14 October 1895; Guadalajara, Spain
- Died: 20 June 1933 (aged 37) (presumed); Vicinity of Villahermosa, Mexico
- Cause of death: Air accident (presumed)
- Known for: Took part in the historic flight of the Cuatro Vientos from Seville, Spain to Camagüey, Cuba on 10–11 June 1933

Mariano Barberán y Tros de Ilarduya (14 October 1895, in Guadalajara, Spain – 20 June 1933, in Vicinity of Villahermosa, Mexico) was a Spanish military aviator.

== Flight ==
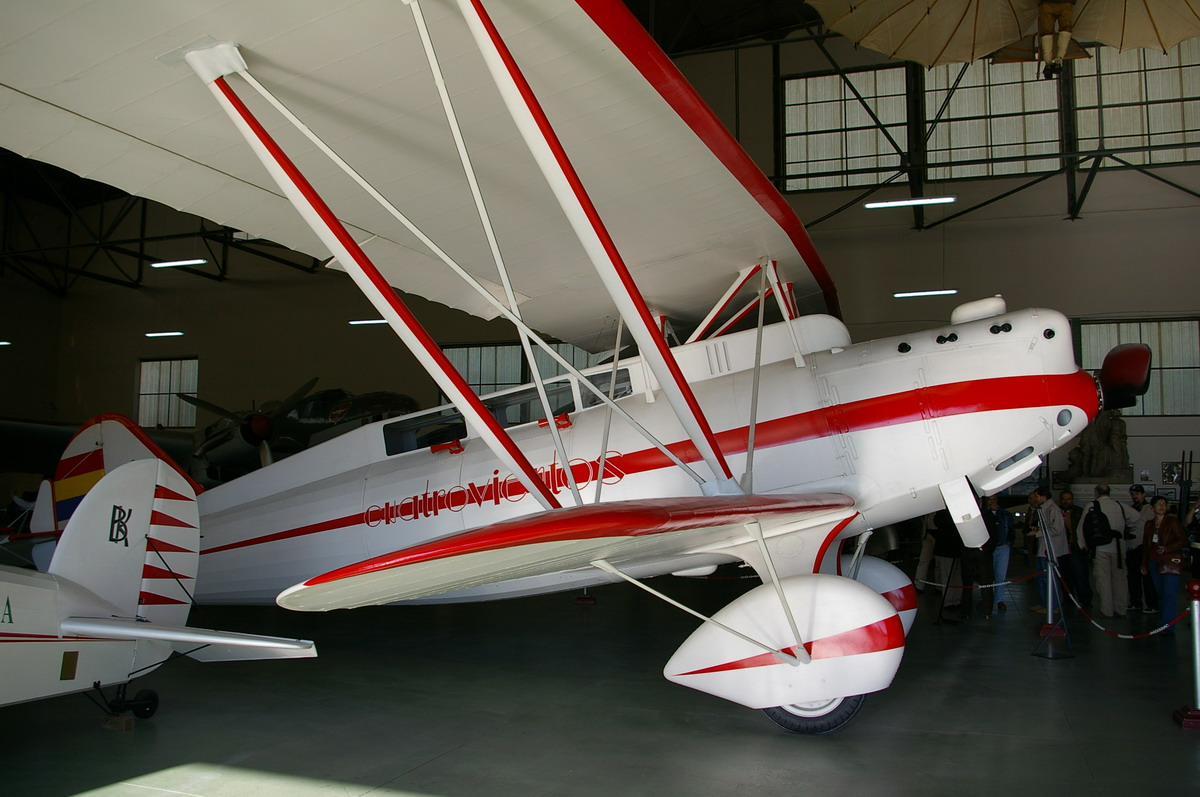
A replica of the Cuatro Vientos

In 1933, together with Lieutenant Joaquín Collar Serra and Sergeant Modesto Madariaga he flew the Cuatro Vientos, a Br.19 TF Super Bidon built specially for this flight, from Spain to Cuba. The flight, which took 39 hours and 55 minutes, departed Seville on at 4:40 on 10 June 1933 and arrived in Camagüey at 20:45 (local time) on 11 June 1933, after a flight of 7320 km.

== Disappearance ==
The plane departed for Mexico City on 20 June 1933, without Madariaga on board, and disappeared in flight, being last sighted in the vicinity of Villahermosa, Mexico. No trace of the plane or of its two occupants was subsequently found.

== See also ==
- List of people who disappeared
