= Delegación Nacional de Deportes =

Defunct Spanish autonomous body

National Sports Delegation
- Delegación Nacional de Deportes
- Abbreviation: DND
- Successor: Consejo Superior de Deportes
- Founded: 22 February 1941
- Dissolved: 7 April 1977
- Headquarters: Madrid, Spain
- Location: Francoist Spain
- Key people: See National delegates section

The National Sports Delegation (Spanish: Delegación Nacional de Deportes; DND) was a Spanish autonomous body, belonging to the Falange Española Tradicionalista party and the JONS, which existed during the Franco dictatorship and which had among its powers the direction of Spanish sports policy. It was dissolved in 1977 and replaced by the Higher Sports Council (CSD).

== History ==
The body was established by decree on 22 February 1941, and was in charge of the sports policies of the Franco regime. Francisco Franco appointed General José Moscardó as the first national sports delegate. In the post-war context, during the first years the delegation had few material resources at its disposal. In 1956, a new national delegate was appointed, José Antonio Elola-Olaso, and the organization adopted the new name of "National Delegation of Physical Education and Sports", and was attached to the General Secretary of the Movement. Under the direction of Elola-Olaso, the national delegation took a turn in its line of action, carrying out campaigns to promote sports and physical education. Starting in 1956, Spanish sport received an important institutional boost.

The arrival of the new national delegate meant a change in the sports training model under military guidelines that had prevailed until then, and its replacement by a new civil model supervised by the Falange organizations. In this sense, one of the most important measures carried out was the promulgation in 1961 of the Physical Education Law —also known as the Elola-Olaso Law, which considered “Physical and Sports Education as a public necessity that the State recognizes and guarantees as a right of all Spaniards. Under the support of said law, the National Institute of Physical Education (INEF) was established in 1967.

In 1970, a decree established the provincial delegations of Physical Education and Sports.

After Franco's death, and the dismantling of the institutions of the Franco regime, in 7 April 1977 the body was dissolved. Months later, the Higher Sports Council (CSD) was established in its place, which assumed the role and functions previously carried out by the National Sports Delegation.

== National delegates ==
Name	Took office	Left office
José Moscardó Ituarte	5 March 1951	12 April 1956
José Antonio Elola-Olaso	8 May 1956	23 December 1966
Juan Antonio Samaranch	26 December 1966	9 September 1970
Juan Gich Bech de Careda	9 September 1970	15 July 1975
Tomás Pelayo Ros	15 July 1975	9 September 1976
Benito Castejón Paz	9 September 1976	25 April 1977

== Bibliography ==
- Cámara, Gregorio (1984). Nacional-catolicismo y escuela. La socialización política del franquismo, 1936-1951 (in Spanish). Hesperia.
- Espartero Casado, Julián; Palomar Olmeda, Alberto (2011). Titulaciones y regulación del ejercicio profesional en el deporte (in Spanish). Dykinson. ISBN 978-84-15454-88-5.
- Fraile, Antonio (2004). El deporte escolar en el siglo XXI: análisis y debate desde una perspectiva europea (in Spanish). Biblioteca de Tándem. ISBN 84-7827-356-5.
- Mestre Sancho, Juan Antonio; Orts, Francisco (2010). Gestión en el deporte (in Spanish). Wanceulen Editorial Deportiva.
- Morcillo, Aurora G. (2010). The Seduction of Modern Spain. The Female Body and the Francoist Body Politic. Rosemont Publishing. ISBN 978-0-8387-5753-6.
- Rivero, Antonio (2008). Las leyes del deporte español. Análisis y evolución histórica (in Spanish). Wanceulen Editorial deportiva. ISBN 978-84-9823-237-0.
- Rodríguez Cabrero, Gregorio (2003). Las entidades voluntarias de acción social en España (in Spanish). Fundación Foessa. ISBN 84-8440-298-3.
- Rodríguez Ten, Javier (2008). Deporte y Derecho administrativo sancionador (in Spanish). Editorial Reus.
- Tamayo Fajardo, Javier A. (2005). Historia de España en los Juegos Olímpicos de verano de la Era Moderna I (1896-1936) (in Spanish). Wanceulen Editorial Deportiva. ISBN 84-9823-001-2.
