= Cuatro Vientos (aircraft) =

Aircraft disappearance

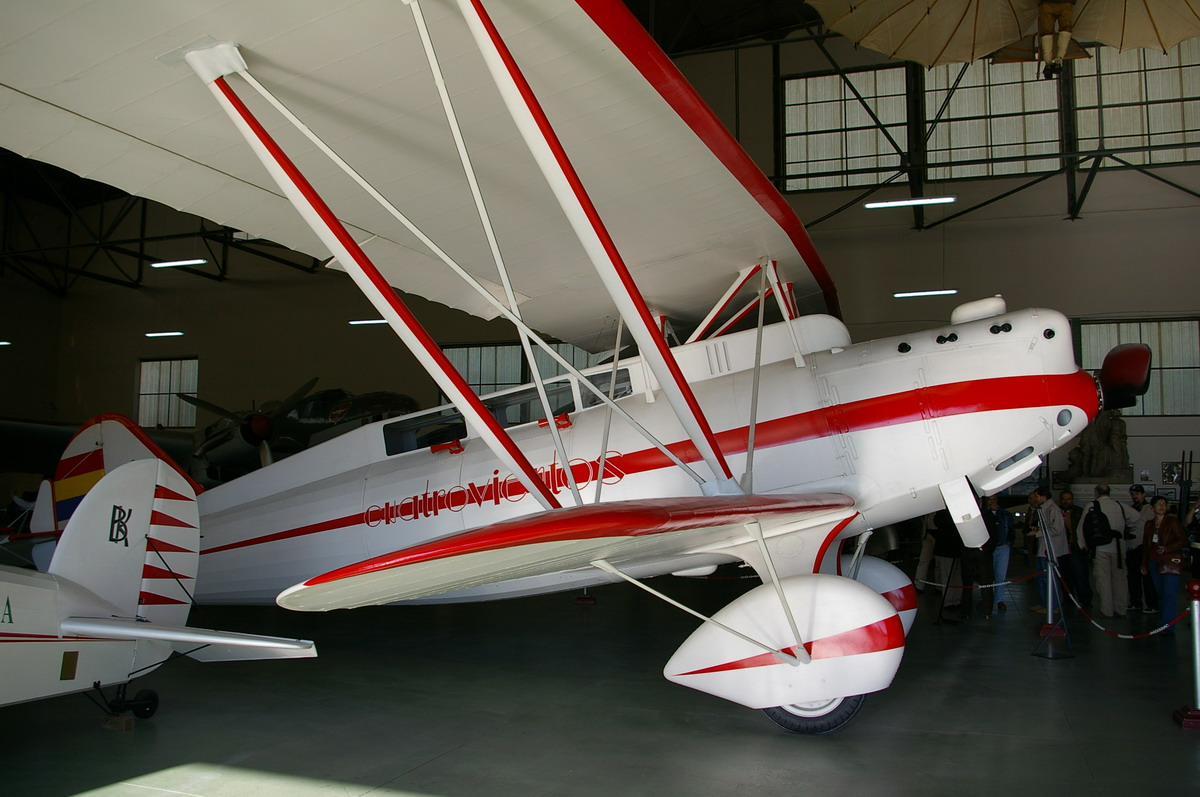
- A replica of the Cuatro Vientos at the Museo del Aire

General information
- Type: Breguet Br.19 TF Super Bidon
- Manufacturer: Breguet Aviation
- Owners: Spanish Air Force

History
- First flight: 1929
- Preserved at: A replica is on display at the Museo del Aire in Madrid
- Fate: Disappeared in the vicinity of Villahermosa, Mexico

The Cuatro Vientos was a specially built Br.19 TF Super Bidon, which Mariano Barberán y Tros de Ilarduya, Lieutenant Joaquín Collar Serra and Sergeant Modesto Madariaga flew from Spain to Cuba in 1933. The flight, which took 39 hours and 55 minutes, departed Seville at 4:40 on 10 June 1933, and arrived in Camagüey at 20:45 (local time) on 11 June 1933, after a flight of 7,320 kilometres (4,550 mi).

On 20 June 1933, the aircraft departed for Mexico City, without Madariaga on board. It disappeared in flight, and was last sighted in the vicinity of Villahermosa, Mexico. No trace of the plane or of its occupants was subsequently found.

A replica of the Cuatro Vientos is housed at the Museo del Aire.
