= 1949–50 Atlético Madrid season =

Atlético Madrid
1949–50 season
- President: Cesáreo Galíndez
- Head coach: Helenio Herrera
- Stadium: Metropolitano
- Primera Division: Winners (in 1950 Latin Cup)
- Copa del Generalísimo: Quarter-finals
- Latin Cup: 3rd place
- Top goalscorer: League: Rafael Mujica (12); All: Larbi Benbarek (16)
Home colours

The 1949–50 season was Atlético Madrid's 46th season in existence and the club's 13th consecutive season in the top flight of Spanish football.

== Summary ==
During summer the club appointed Helenio Herrera as its new head coach arriving from Real Valladolid. Aimed by superb performances of Rafael Mujica, midfielder Larbi Benbarek, Swedish Henrik Carlsson and Forward Adrian Escudero the team clinched the league title.

== Squad ==
Note: Flags indicate national team as defined under FIFA eligibility rules; some limited exceptions apply. Players may hold more than one non-FIFA nationality.

Pos.	Nation	Player
GK	FRA	Marcel Domingo
GK	ESP	Alberto Pérez Zabala
DF	ESP	Diego Lozano
DF	ESP	Rafael Mújica
DF	ESP	Rafael García Repullo
DF	ESP	Juan José Mencía
DF	ESP	Alfonso Aparicio
DF	ESP	José Luis Riera
MF	ESP	José Hernández González
MF	SWE	Henry Carlsson
MF	MAR	Larbi Ben Barek

Pos.	Nation	Player
MF	ESP	Julián Cuenca
MF	ESP	Alfonso Silva
MF	ESP	Salvador Estruch Mañez
MF	ARG	Ernesto Candia
MF	ESP	Juan Babot
FW	ESP	Adrián Escudero
FW	ESP	Manuel Santana Farias
FW	ESP	José Juncosa
FW	ESP	Antonio Durán
FW	ESP	Calsita
FW	ESP	Miguel González Pérez

=== Transfers ===
In
Pos.	Name	from	Type
MF	Henry Carlsson	AIK	
FW	Miguel Gonzalez Perez	Victoria	
DF	Rafael Lesmes	Real Valladolid	loan
MF	Børge Mathiesen	Stade Francais	

Out
Pos.	Name	To	Type
MF	Børge Mathiesen	Racing Santander	loan
DF	Jose Valdivieso	Real Zaragoza	

== Competitions ==
=== Primera División ===
==== League table ====
Pos	Team	Pld	W	D	L	GF	GA	GD	Pts	Qualification or relegation
1	Atlético Madrid (C)	26	15	3	8	71	51	+20	33	Qualification for the Latin Cup
2	Deportivo La Coruña	26	12	8	6	48	38	+10	32	
3	Valencia	26	12	7	7	71	43	+28	31 (Note: Valencia finished ahead of Real Madrid on overall goal difference.)	
4	Real Madrid	26	11	9	6	60	49	+11	31	
5	Barcelona	26	13	3	10	67	47	+20	29 (Note: Barcelona finished ahead of Atlético Bilbao on head-to-head points: Barcelona 5–0 Atlético Bilbao, Atlético Bilbao 3–1 Barcelona.)	

Source: BDFútbol
Rules for classification: 1) points; 2) head-to-head points; 3) head-to-head goal difference; 4) goal difference; 5) number of goals scored.
(C) Champions

==== Position by round ====
Round	1	2	3	4	5	6	7	8	9	10	11	12	13	14	15	16	17	18	19	20	21	22	23	24	25	26
Ground	H	A	A	H	A	H	A	H	A	H	A	H	A	H	A	A	H	H	A	H	A	H	A	H	A	H
Result	W	W	L	W	L	W	L	L	L	W	L	W	L	W	D	W	W	D	W	W	W	W	L	W	W	D
Position	6	3	5	2	4	4	5	8	9	7	8	7	11	10	8	7	4	5	3	1	2	1	2	1	1	1

Source: www.lfp.es
A = Away; H = Home; W = Win; D = Draw; L = Loss; = 1950 Latin Cup; = 1950-51 Segunda Division

==== Matches ====
27 November 1949 1	Real Valladolid	0–1	Atlético Madrid	Valladolid
		Report	48' Carlsson	Stadium: José Zorrilla; Referee: Ramón Azón Roma

11 September 1949 2	Atlético Madrid	3–2	Málaga	Madrid
	Escudero 3'; Juncosa 56'; Maciá 71' (aut)	Report	5' Gamonal; 83' Bazán	Stadium: Metropolitano; Referee: José Barderi Gibert

18 September 1949 3	Celta	2–0	Atlético Madrid	Vigo
	Hermida 60'; Yayo 72'	Report		Stadium: Balaídos; Referee: José María Rivero Lecuona

25 September 1949 4	Atlético Madrid	5–2	Espanol	Madrid
	Ben Barek 14', 25', 65'; Teruel 58' (aut); Silva 87'	Report	68' Artigas; 71' (rig) R. Hernández	Stadium: Metropolitano; Referee: José Fombona Fernández

2 October 1949 5	Atletico Bilbao	1–0	Atlético Madrid	Bilbao
	Gaínza 21'	Report		Stadium: San Mamés; Referee: Ramón Azón Roma

9 October 1949 6	Atlético Madrid	5–1	Gimnastic	Madrid
	Mújica 15', 47' (rig), 86'; Juncosa 31'; Ben Barek 88'	Report	43' Vázquez	Stadium: Metropolitano; Referee: José Mazagatos Vicario

16 October 1949 7	Real Madrid	4–2	Atlético Madrid	Madrid
	Aparicio 1' (aut); Muñoz 30' (rig); Cabrera 82'; Pahiño 87'	Report	20', 52' Escudero	Stadium: Chamartín; Referee: José María Rivero Lecuona

23 October 1949 8	Atlético Madrid	0–1	Sevilla FC	Madrid
		Report	12' Moro	Stadium: Metropolitano; Referee: Rafael García Fernández

30 October 1949 9	Deportivo La Coruna	3–1	Atlético Madrid	La Coruña
	Franco 70' (rig), 83' (rig), 89'	Report	28' Mújica	Stadium: Riazor; Referee: Julián Arqué Martín

6 November 1949 10	Atlético Madrid	4–1	Barcelona	Madrid
	Carlsson 18', 32', 44'; Cuenca 30' (rig)	Report	50' Aretio	Stadium: Metropolitano; Referee: Francisco Bienzobas Ocariz

13 November 1949 11	Real Sociedad	4–1	Atlético Madrid	San Sebastián
	Ontoria 26' (rig); Caeiro 56'; Artigas 76'; Pérez 80'	Report	7' Carlsson	Stadium: Atocha; Referee: Rafael García Fernández

20 November 1949 12	Atlético Madrid	4–1	Real Oviedo	Madrid
	Mújica 6', 45'; Miguel 13', 89'	Report	49' Antón	Stadium: Metropolitano; Referee: Rafael Tamarit Falaguera

4 December 1949 13	Valencia	6–0	Atlético Madrid	Valencia
	Seguí 22', 41', 67', 85'; Igoa 40'; Mena 82'	Report		Stadium: Mestalla; Referee: José Barderi Gibert

11 December 1949 14	Atlético Madrid	2–1	Real Valladolid	Madrid
	Calsita 59', 78'	Report	43' Revuelta	Stadium: Metropolitano; Referee: Fernando Aurre Larrea

18 December 1949 15	CD Málaga	3–3	Atlético Madrid	Málaga
	Teo 28'; Torres 82', 88'	Report	10', 71' Durán; 16' Candia	Stadium: La Rosaleda; Referee: Francisco Bienzobas Ocariz

15 January 1950 16	Atlético Madrid	4–2	Celta	Madrid
	Ben Barek 40'; Calsita 42', 89'; Estruch 58'	Report	39' Sobrado; 57' (rig) Yayo	Stadium: Metropolitano; Referee: Julián Arqué Martín

22 January 1950 17	Espanol	0–2	Atlético Madrid	Barcelona
		Report	54', 62' (rig) Estruch	Stadium: Sarriá; Referee: Francisco Echave Michelena

29 January 1950 18	Atlético Madrid	6–6	Atletico Bilbao	Madrid
	Carlsson 3'; Ben Barek 16', 84' (rig); Lozano 68'; Calsita 85'; Aparicio 89'	Report	1', 47' Gaínza; 52', 57' (rig), 69' Iriondo; 65' Zarra	Stadium: Metropolitano; Referee: Rafael García Fernández

5 February 1950 19	Gimnastic	0–4	Atlético Madrid	Tarragona
		Report	47', 72' Calsita; 59', 70' Candia	Stadium: Avinguda de Catalunya; Referee: Julián Arqué Martín

12 February 1950 20	Atlético Madrid	5–1	Real Madrid	Madrid
	Mújica 18', 54' (rig); Juncosa 23', 74'; Escudero 39'	Report	30' Narro	Stadium: Metropolitano; Referee: Francisco Giménez Molina

19 February 1950 21	Sevilla FC	0–1	Atlético Madrid	Seville
		Report	53' Mencía	Stadium: Nervión; Referee: José Barderi Gibert

26 February 1950 22	Atlético Madrid	6–1	Deportivo La Coruna	Madrid
	Mújica 6', 83'; Carlsson 12'; Escudero 14', 85'; Ben Barek 19'	Report	53' Ponce	Stadium: Metropolitano; Referee: Julián Arqué Martín

5 March 1950 23	CF Barcelona	1–0	Atlético Madrid	Barcelona
	Giménez 31'	Report		Stadium: Les Corts; Referee: Antonio Pérez Rodríguez

12 March 1950 24	Atlético Madrid	5–3	Real Sociedad	Madrid
	Artigas 1' (aut); Ben Barek 34'; Mújica 55'; Escudero 66', 78'	Report	47' Basabe; 50' Pérez-Payá; 60' Caeiro	Stadium: Metropolitano; Referee: Francisco Giménez Molina

16 April 1950 25	Real Oviedo	1–3	Atlético Madrid	Oviedo
	Antón 12'	Report	48' Silva; 54' Juncosa; 76' Escudero	Stadium: Buenavista; Referee: Francisco Giménez Molina

23 April 1950 26	Atlético Madrid	4–4	Valencia CF	Madrid
	Ben Barek 9', 39'; Carlsson 46'; Mújica 49' (rig)	Report	5' (rig), 60', 78' Igoa; 65' Puchades	Stadium: Metropolitano; Referee: Julián Arqué Martín

=== Copa del Generalísimo ===
==== Eightfinals ====
30 April 1950 1	CD Málaga	4–3	Atlético Madrid	Málaga
	Torres 13', 53'; Azcue 15', 86'	Report	51' Escudero; 64' Ben Barek; 80' Juncosa	Stadium: La Rosaleda; Referee: Rafael Tamarit Falaguera

7 May 1950 2	Atlético Madrid	4–2	CD Málaga	Madrid
	Ben Barek 8', 61'; Juncosa 34'; Estruch 85'	Report	47' Chao; 68' Loli	Stadium: Metropolitano; Referee: José Barderi Gibert

==== Quarterfinals ====
14 May 1950 1	Real Madrid	6–3	Atlético Madrid	Madrid
	Montalvo 18' (pen.); Molowny 21', 42'; Makala 30', 86'; Olmedo 66'	Report	53' Aparicio; 71' Juncosa; 73' Escudero	Stadium: Chamartín; Referee: Rafael García Fernández

18 May 1950 2	Atlético Madrid	1–0	Real Madrid	Madrid
	Escudero 84'	Report		Stadium: Metropolitano; Referee: Ramón Azón Roma

=== Latin Cup ===
10 June 1950 semifinals	Girondins Bordeaux (France)	4–2	(Spain) Atlético Madrid	Oeiras
	Karga 16', 88'; Doye 44'; Babot 90' (aut.)	Report	48' Ben Barek; 77' Carlsson	Stadium: Jamor; Referee: (Portugal) Paulo de Oliveira

11 June 1950 Third place	Atlético Madrid (Spain)	2–1	(Italy) Lazio	Oeiras
	Ben Barek 10'; Escudero 16'	Report	73' Nyers	Stadium: Jamor; Referee: (France) Gabriel Tordjmann
Note: Juventus, AC Milan, and Inter Milan declined participation in the tournament due to the 1950 FIFA World Cup.

== Statistics ==
=== Players statistics ===
No.	Pos	Nat	Player	Total		Primera Division		Copa del Generalisimo		Latin Cup	
No.	Pos	Nat	Player	Apps	Goals	Apps	Goals	Apps	Goals	Apps	Goals
-	GK	(France) FRA	Marcel Domingo	26	-51	22	-39	3	-8	1	-4
-	DF	(Spain) ESP	Rafael Mújica	21	12	21	12				
-	DF	(Spain) ESP	Juan José Mencía	29	1	25	1	4	0		
-	DF	(Spain) ESP	Diego Lozano	23	1	19	1	4	0		
-	DF	(Spain) ESP	José Luis Riera	20	0	16	0	3	0	1	0
-	MF	(Sweden) SWE	Henry Carlsson	29	9	23	8	4	0	2	1
-	MF	(Morocco) MAR	Larbi Ben Barek	25	16	20	11	3	3	2	2
-	MF	(Spain) ESP	Alfonso Silva	22	2	19	2	3	0		
-	FW	(Spain) ESP	José Juncosa	27	8	23	5	4	3		
-	FW	(Spain) ESP	Adrián Escudero	24	13	19	9	4	3	1	1
-	FW	(Spain) ESP	Manuel Santana	19	0	15	0	2	0	2	0
-	GK	(Spain) ESP	Alberto Pérez Zabala	7	-10	4+3	-10				
-	DF	(Spain) ESP	Rafael García Repullo	14	0	10	0	3	0	1	0
-	DF	(Spain) ESP	Alfonso Aparicio	10	2	9	1	1	1		
-	MF	(Spain) ESP	José Hernández González	12	0	9	0	2	0	1	0
-	FW	(Spain) ESP	Calsita	8	6	8	6				
-	FW	(Spain) ESP	Miguel González Pérez	6	2	6	2				
-	FW	(Spain) ESP	Antonio Durán	5	3	5	3				
-	MF	(Spain) ESP	Julián Cuenca	6	1	5	1	0	0	1	0
-	MF	(Spain) ESP	Salvador Estruch	9	4	4	3	3	1	2	0
-	MF	(Argentina) ARG	Ernesto Candia	4	3	4	3				
-	MF	(Spain) ESP	Juan Babot	1	0	0	0	0	0	1	0
-	GK	(Spain) ESP	Francisco Villarreal	1	-4	0	0	1	-4		
-	DF	(Spain) ESP	Rafael Lesmes	2	0	0	0	0	0	2	0
-	FW	(Spain) ESP	Pahiño	1	0	0	0	0	0	1	0
-	FW	(Spain) ESP	Pablo Olmedo	2	0	0	0	0	0	2	-
-	FW	(Spain) ESP	Vicente Dauder	1	-1	0	0	0	0	1	-1
-	FW	(Spain) ESP	Agustín Sánchez	1	0	0	0	0	0	1	0
-	GK	(Spain) ESP	Jose Ces Riveiro	1	-2	0+1	-2				

- Source: https://www.bdfutbol.com/en/t/t1949-507.html
