= Juan José Mencía =

Spanish footballer

Personal information
- Full name: Juan José Mencía Angulo
- Date of birth: 5 March 1923
- Place of birth: Sestao, Biscay, Spain
- Date of death: 20 May 2012 (aged 89)
- Place of death: Barrika, Spain
- Height: 1.72 m (5 ft 8 in)
- Position: Defender

Youth career
- 1932: Kasalta Txiki

Senior career*
Years	Team	Apps	(Gls)
1940–1942	Siempre Adelante		
1942–1944	Barakaldo		
1944–1947	Atlético Aviación		
1947–1954	Atlético Madrid		

International career
1951	Spain	1	(0)
- * Club domestic league appearances and goals

Juan José Mencía Angulo, better known as Mencía (5 March 1923 – 20 May 2012), was a Spanish footballer who played as a defender for Atlético Madrid for 10 seasons between 1944 and 1954. He also played one national match for Spain in 1951.

== Playing career ==
=== Club career ===
Born in the Biscayan town of Sestao on 5 March 1923, Mencía began playing football at Kasalta Txiki, a non-federated team Sestao, in 1932, at the age of 9. He started his career in the lower categories of a Sestao club called Siempre Adelante, from where he moved to Barakaldo in 1942. While there, he stood out from the rest, becoming a highly valued player sought after by the big clubs, receiving offers from Athletic Bilbao, Valencia, Barcelona, and Real Madrid, but in the end, he signed for Atlético Madrid in 1944, then called Atlético Aviación, a club where he would remain for over 10 seasons, until his retirement in 1954.

Together with José Luis Riera, Alfonso Aparicio, Alfonso Silva, and Ben Barek, Mencía was a member of the great Atlético team of the early 1950s that won back-to-back La Liga title in 1949–50 and La Liga, plus the Copa Eva Duarte in 1951, and also the 1941–47 FEF President Cup, the longest tournament in the history of Spanish football, starting in the decisive match against Valencia in 1947 (4–0), which had been in stand by since 1941. Mencía was one of the most profitable footballers of the Colchonero club, being a member of the well-known Defensa de Cristal formed by Farias, himself, and Julián Cuenca. In total, Mencía played 148 official matches with Atlético (129 in the League and 20 in the Cup) in which he scored two goals, both in the league.

On 24 April 1956, Mencía was the subject of a tribute match from Atlético, which was held in Madrid against English club Newcastle United, which ended in a 4–1 win to Atlético. Mencía received the Silver Medal for Sporting Merit from the Madrid City Council, as well as gifts and presents from both clubs and fans. He also donated the proceeds from the match (375,000 pesetas) to the Rebonza Nursing Home and to the construction of a nursery school, both of which in his hometown of Sestao, with the latter still bearing his name and today belongs to the BBK network of nursery schools. For this gesture, the Franco regime awarded him the Order of Beneficence.

=== International career ===
On 18 February 1951, the 27-year-old Mencía earned his first (and only) international cap for Spain in a friendly match against Switzerland at the Estadio Chamartín in Madrid, helping his side to a 6–3 win.

== Later life and death ==
After retiring from football, Mencía worked as a civil servant, tax official, and as a treasury mayor. He also was a member of the Association of Economists of Vizcaya and the Institute of Fiscal Studies.

Mencía died in Bilbao on 20 May 2012, at the age of 89.

== Honours ==
Atlético Madrid

- FEF President Cup:
  - Champions (1): 1941–47
- La Liga:
  - Champions (2): 1949–50 and 1950–51
- La Liga:
- Copa Eva Duarte:
  - Champions (1): 1951
