= Manuel Torres =

Manuel Torres may refer to:

== Government and politics ==
- Manuel Torres (diplomat) (1762–1822), first Colombian ambassador to the United States
- Manuel Montt (1809–1880), Torres, president of Chile between 1851 and 1861
- Manuel A. Torres (born 1965), Puerto Rican politician

== Sports ==
- Manuel Torres (born 1995), Mexican mixed martial artist
- Manuel Torres (equestrian) (born 1957), Colombian Olympic equestrian
- Manuel Torres (footballer) (1912–1990), Spanish football midfielder turned manager
- Manuel Torres (footballer) (1926–2006), Spanish football midfielder turned manager
- Manuel Torres (footballer) (1930–2014), Spanish football midfielder
- Manuel Torres (footballer, born 1978), Panamanian football defensive midfielder
- Manuel Torres (footballer, born 1991), Spanish football attacking midfielder Wieczysta Kraków
- Manuel Torres (sportscaster) (1941–2021), Mexican baseball broadcaster, announcer and sportswriter
- Juan Manuel Torres (born 1985), Argentine footballer

== Others ==
- Manuel Torre or Manuel Torres (1878–1933), flamenco singer
- Manuel Torres Félix (1958–2012), Mexican criminal
- Constantino Manuel Torres, archaeologist
- Manuel R. Torres, Spanish researcher
- Manuel Torres (sculptor) (1938–2018), Spanish sculptor
