= Anguera (surname) =

Anguera is a Spanish surname. Notable people with the surname include:

- Antonio Anguera (1921–1993), Spanish footballer
- José Espasa Anguera (1840–1911), Spanish publisher
- Javier Anguera Phipps, founder of Contemporary Culture Index
