= FEF President Cup =

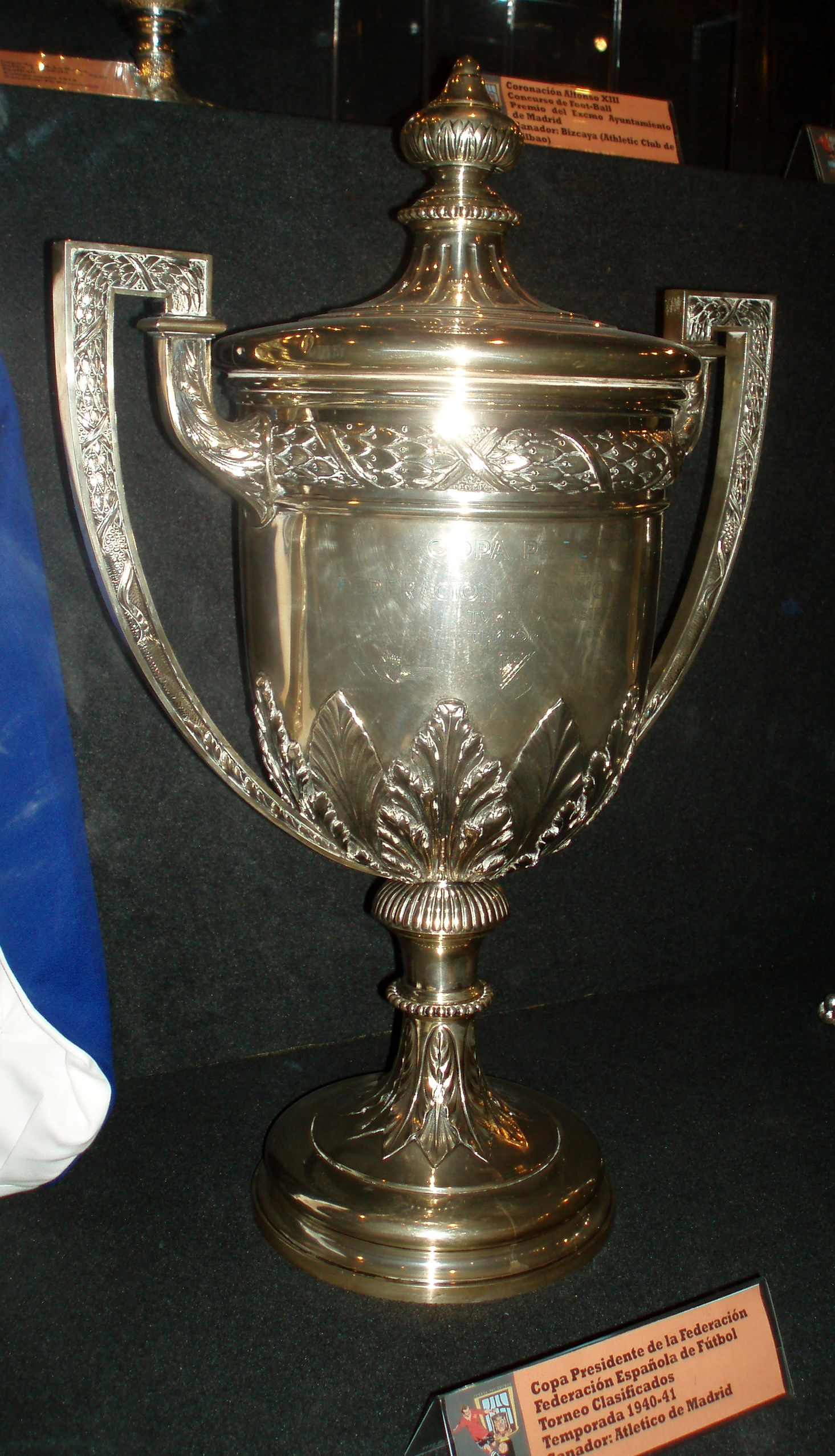
- The 1941–47 trophy exhibited in the RFEF Museum, temporarily loaned by Club Atlético de Madrid.
- Organiser(s): RFEF
- Founded: 1940
- Abolished: 1947
- Region: Spain
- Last champions: Atlético de Madrid (1947)
- Most championships: CD Malacitano; Atlético de Madrid (1 title)

The FEF President Cup (Spanish: Copa Presidente de la Federación Española de Fútbol) was the name of two football competitions held in Spain in the 1940s, both officially recognized by the Royal Spanish Football Federation (RFEF), who even donated a trophy for the second tournament.

There are two different tournaments, the first was held in 1940, as a consolation tournament for clubs from the Segunda División, which was won by Club Deportivo Malacitano (currently known as Málaga CF), while the second was created as a replacement for the so-called Iberian Cup, and which was contested by First Division teams and won by Atlético de Madrid. The latter started in 1941, but for various reasons it only ended six years later in 1947, thus making it the longest tournament in the history of football.

== 1940 FEF President Cup (Second Division) ==
Pos	Team	Pld	W	D	L	GF	GA	GD	Pts	Qualification or relegation
1	Club Deportivo Malacitano	8	5	2	1	27	13	+14	12	Champion
2	CA Osasuna	8	5	1	2	18	12	+6	11	
3	CD Sabadell	8	2	2	4	18	21	−3	6	
4	AD Ferroviaria	8	3	0	5	16	21	−5	6	
5	Recreativo de Granada	8	2	1	5	11	23	−12	5	

Source: bdfutbol
Rules for classification: 1) points; 2) head-to-head points; 3) head-to-head goal difference; 4) goal difference; 5) number of goals scored; 6) fair-play points; 7) playoff match

== Final ==
4 May 1941	Atlético Madrid	4–0	Valencia CF	Madrid
	Basabe 4', 43'; Silva 51', 53'	Report1; Report2		Stadium: Metropolitano; Referee: Iturralde

== Other tournaments ==
There are other tournaments, which were held between the 1930s and 1940s, with a similar name, Copa Presidente, but from the federations of the regional areas to which they belonged, such as the Copa Presidente Federación Castellana (1940–41 and 1943–44), or the Copa Presidente Federación Vasca, but they have nothing to do with this tournament and are competitions with a different format and of a regional character.

== See also ==
- Copa Federación Centro
- Copa de los Campeones de España
- Copa Eva Duarte
