= Antonio Anguera =

Spanish footballer (1921–1993)

Personal information
- Full name: Antonio Anguera Bernaus
- Birth name: Antoni Anguera i Bernaus
- Date of birth: 17 February 1921
- Place of birth: Térmens, Catalonia, Spain
- Date of death: 1 September 1993 (aged 72)
- Place of death: Lleida, Catalonia, Spain
- Height: 1.71 m (5 ft 7 in)
- Position: Defender

Youth career
- 1933–1936: Escola del Treball de Lleida

Senior career*
Years	Team	Apps	(Gls)
1939–1940	UE Lleida		
1940–1942	FC Barcelona		
1942–1943	UE Lleida		
- * Club domestic league appearances and goals

Antonio Anguera Bernaus (17 February 1921 – 1 September 1993) was a Spanish footballer who played as a defender for UE Lleida and FC Barcelona.

== Early life ==
Antonio Anguera was born on 17 February 1921 in Térmens, Lleida as the son of Antoni and Brígida, and began playing football in Lleida in 1933, at the age of just 12, in the Escola del Treball de Lleida (Lleida Labor School team). Despite quickly falling in love with this sport, his parents, who ran an awning business, did not view his son's hobby very favorably, but his father's first cousin, Enric Bernaus, was his number one fan.

== Playing career ==
=== Early career ===
Anguera played for the school team for three years until 1936, when the Spanish Civil War broke out. After the civil war ended in 1939, he joined the first team of Lérida Balompié, which would later become UE Lleida, where he played the 1939–40 season, at the age of 18. There, he quickly stood out as a great defender and eventually drew the attention of RCD Espanyol, who called him for a test in Barcelona, where he stayed at his uncles' house, who lived on Valencia Street. In the same building lived a person closely related to FC Barcelona and, when he found out about the boy's presence, he told him to go try out for Barça first, and they kept him, signing him in 1940, at 19 years old.

=== FC Barcelona ===
Anguera made his official debut for Barcelona in the opening game of the 1940–41 La Liga on 29 September, which ended in a humiliating 11–1 loss to Sevilla CF. He quickly established himself as an undisputed starter, since he always offered his best and gave everything for the Barça shirt. His promising career, however, was cut short on 9 February 1941 in Balaídos, where he received a severe blow to his Achilles' heel, a setback that did not prevent him from finishing the match, which Barça won 1–4, but it did leave him absent from the next one against Real Murcia, before reappearing against Real Madrid and also playing in the final match of the league season against Athletic Bilbao on 2 March 1941. Anguera also played three matches in the 1941–47 FEF President Cup, including a 1–1 draw with Valencia in which Mundo got a red card for an attempted attack on him.

However, the annoyances were always there and they did not disappear. In the following season, 1941–42, Anguera did not play until the sixth matchday, against Real Sociedad in San Sebastián (2–0), but he had to take a step back after a match against Granada CF on 15 February 1942, which was his last official match. While at Barça, the club won the 1942 Copa del Generalísimo, but he did not contribute to the title since he did not play any cup match due to the discomfort he suffered. Before the matches in Les Corts, "they warmed up on the way to the field, walking with a firm step and taking a carajillo in the bar before dressing in shorts". In total, he played 37 official matches for Barça.

In Barcelona, he cultivated friendships with Manuel Rosalén, José Bravo, and the presidents Marqués de la Mesa de Asta and Josep Vendrell.

=== Later career ===
Anguera had to have surgery, but his father told him to "stop fooling around, to get to work", but Anguera kept pursuing his passion and, with great pain, returned to Lérida Balompié in the 1942–43 season, although his injured heel only allowed him to line up in one match and he ended up retiring from football at the age of just 22.

== Playing style ==
From a hard-working family, Anguera transmitted these values on the field, protected by a well-built physique. Bernaus stated years later that Anguera "was all nerve, speed, and sacrifice".

== Later life ==
After retiring, Anguera joined the awning business run by his father, who also had a small store where he sold suitcases, wallets, purses, and other merchandise. He lived in Lleida, but regularly went down to Barcelona to watch their matches. On one occasion, Anguera told Nicolau Casaus, then vice-president of Barcelona, that the ex-players should have a seat in the Camp Nou, since he wanted his grandchildren to know in which team his grandfather had played, but Casaus replied that if the board did that, they would have to expand the field.

Fond of hunting, he exhausted even the dogs, and "sometimes he returned home burdened with how tired they were".

== Death ==
In May 1989, Anguera followed Barcelona by car to the 1989 European Cup Winners' Cup final in Bern with his cousins Josep, Francesc, and Lluís Bernaus, which Barça won 2–0. He died in Lleida five months later, on 1 September 1993 at the age of 72, the victim of an illness.

In July 2015, his widow, the 91-year-old Nati, was presented with the 'Great dictionary of Barça players', in which Anguera shines on page 32.
