= José Luis Riera (footballer) =

Spanish footballer and manager

Personal information
- Full name: José Luis Riera Biosca
- Birth name: Josep Lluís Riera Biosca
- Date of birth: 26 November 1920
- Place of birth: Barcelona, Catalonia, Spain
- Date of death: 20 May 1987 (aged 66)
- Place of death: Jerez de la Frontera, Andalusia, Spain
- Position: Defender

Youth career
- Mirandés
- Ripoll
- 1935–1936: Athletic de Palma

Senior career*
Years	Team	Apps	(Gls)
1939–1940	RCD Mallorca		
1940–1942	CE Constància		
1942–1947	Atlético Aviación		
1947–1951	Atlético Madrid		
1951–1953	Real Zaragoza		

International career
1949–1950	Spain	3	(0)

Managerial career
- 1953–1954: UD Huesca
- 1957–1960: CD San Fernando
- 1960–1963: Cádiz CF
- 1963–1964: CD Málaga
- 1964–1965: Recreativo de Huelva
- 1966–1968: UD Tenerife
- 1969–1970: Xerez CD
- 1969–1970: UE Lleida
- * Club domestic league appearances and goals

José Luis Riera Biosca (26 November 1920 – 20 May 1987) was a Spanish footballer who played as a defender for Atlético Madrid and Real Zaragoza. With them, he won two La Liga titles in 1949–50 and 1950–51. He was called up for 3 Spain national teams between 1945 and 1949.

After retiring, he became a manager, taking charge of the likes of Cádiz CF and Recreativo de Huelva.

== Club career ==
=== Early career ===
Born in Barcelona, Riera stood out since he was a child for his corpulence and size, thus playing as a defender in various regional teams, such as Mirandés, Ripoll, and Athletic de Palma, but his progress was halted by the outbreak of the Spanish Civil War in 1936. When the war ended in 1939, he played one season for RCD Mallorca and then signed for CE Constància, which at that time was playing in the Segunda División.

=== Atlético Madrid ===
From there he moved in 1942 to Atlético Madrid, then called Atlético Aviación, with whom Riera made his debut in the First Division. He quickly established himself as an undisputed starter under coach Ricardo Zamora, who placed him as a central defender, making him the first football player in Spain to play in that specific position. He formed a defensive trio with Alfonso Aparicio and Alfonso Silva, which went down in history both at Atlético and in Spanish football as the so-called "Iron Curtain". Later he formed another great defensive trio with Aparicio and Diego Lozano, this one known called Defensa de Cemento (Defense of Cement).

Riera remained at Atlético for a total of 9 seasons, in which he managed to win the League title twice, in 1949–50 and 1950–51, the Copa Eva Duarte in 1951, and also the 1941–47 FEF President Cup, the longest tournament in the history of Spanish football, playing in the decisive match against Valencia CF in 1947, which had been in stand by since 1941, featuring in defense alongside Aparicio and keeping a clean sheet in a 4–0 win. In total, Riera played 181 games with Atlético Madrid, including 152 in the League and 27 in the Copa del Rey, scoring just a single goal, which came in a league fixture.

=== Real Zaragoza ===
In 1951, the 31-year-old Riera signed for Real Zaragoza, where he played his last two seasons as a professional before retiring in 1953 to dedicate himself to technical work. In total, he scored two goals in 177 league matches for Atlético and Zaragoza. On 3 June 1951, Riera played a friendly match for FC Barcelona, helping his side to a 5–3 win over Hull City.

== International career ==
Riera made his international debut for Spain in a friendly match against Portugal on 20 March 1949, at the age of 28, starting in a 1–1 draw. He went on to earn a further two international caps in 1949 and 1950, the latter also against Portugal, but in a 1950 FIFA World Cup qualification match, helping his side to a 5–1 victory.

== Managerial career ==
Riera began his managerial career at the helm of UD Huesca, which he coached for one season in 1953–54. He then two three-year stints with CD San Fernando (1957–1960) and Cádiz CF (1960–1963), before going on to coach the likes of CD Málaga (1963–64), Recreativo de Huelva (1964–65), UD Tenerife (1966–68), Xerez CD (1968–69), and UE Lleida (1969–70).

Riera later stood out as a great technical secretary.

== Death ==
Riera died in Madrid on 20 May 1987, at the age of 67. Those who saw him play always remember his mustache and his forcefulness and speed in marking with the Atlético Madrid shirt.

== Honours ==
Atlético Madrid

- 1941–47 FEF President Cup:
- La Liga: 1949–50, 1950–51
- Copa Eva Duarte: 1951
