= 1941–47 FEF President Cup =

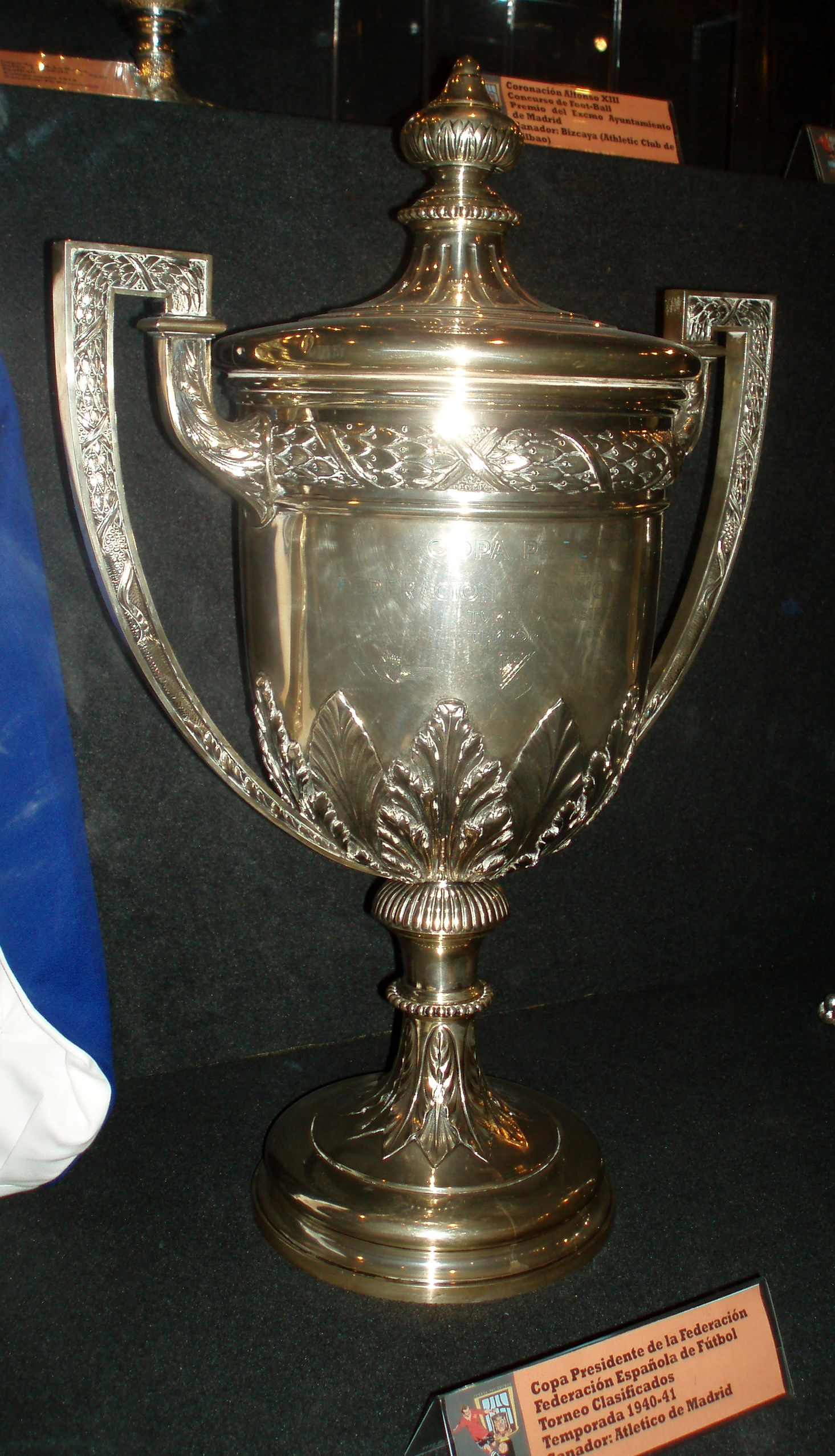
- Trophy exhibited in the RFEF Museum, temporarily loaned by Club Atlético de Madrid.

Tournament details
- Country: Spain
- Dates: 6 April 1941 – 14 September 1947
- Teams: 4

Final positions
- Champions: Athletic-Aviation Club (1st title)
- Runners-up: Valencia CF

Tournament statistics
- Matches played: 12

The 1941–47 FEF President Cup (Spanish: Copa Presidente de la Federación Española de Fútbol de 1941-1947) was a football competition organized by the Royal Spanish Football Federation (RFEF), who donated the trophy and organized the tournament. The tournament was held between 6 April and 4 May 1941, but one last match between Club Atlético-Aviación and Valencia CF, which was decisive for the final classification, was postponed and then various circumstances caused it to be delayed to 14 September 1947. It was won by Atlético, who was thus declared the winner six years after the start of the tournament, which makes the President Cup the longest tournament in the history of Spanish football.

It was contested by the champions of the League and the Copa del Rey and the two best teams classified after the champion in the 1940–41 La Liga, being therefore one of the precedents of the Supercopa de España (given its format with four teams, especially the format adopted by it in 2019).

== History ==
=== Iberian Tournament ===
In the 1940–41 season, the Federations of Spain and Portugal agreed to play annually an international tournament of eight teams, the first four classified teams of the Spanish and Portuguese leagues, which would be called the "Iberian Tournament". The dates were established at the end of the respective leagues and, at least in Spain, before the Spanish Championship began, then known as the Copa Generalissimo. As a result, when planning the calendar, the corresponding space was left for this new international tournament between the greatest football teams in the Iberian Peninsula.

The international match between Portugal and Spain, held in Lisbon on 12 January 1941, served to clarify the conditions and details of such competition. The first official news was given by the general secretary of the Spanish Federation, Juan Antonio Sánchez Ocaña, through an interview in the Madrid newspaper Gol. In principle, it was agreed that it would be played by the Cup-type qualifying system. Groups would be formed for the first from one country would face the fourth from the other; the second with the third, and so on. In March 1941, the Spanish Federation completely ruled out going to a single eliminatory round, since this did not entail economic correspondence, which would be necessary to delve into the difficult problems of economic compensation in terms of box office and travel; each round would thus be a two-legged affair. The country that was going to host the final had been determined by draw: Lisbon.

It was learned that the Portuguese teams, given how their league was going, would be: Benfica and Sporting CP from Lisbon, FC Porto from the city of the same name, and Os Belenenses, also from Lisbon. In Spain, however, it was not so clear because the league was very competitive, but at that time were: Atlético-Aviación, Athletic Bilbao, Real Madrid and Valencia CF. Since RCD Espanyol and FC Barcelona were occupying the seventh and eighth position respectively, the Barcelona press did not even allude to such an "Iberian Tournament", but when Barcelona began its comeback in the last stretch of the league, things changed; and when they beat Madrid in Estadio Chamartín by 2–1 and ousted them from fourth place, they began to talk about it in the Mundo Deportivo, probably to the astonishment of their readers at whose eyes appeared a ghostly international tournament of which he had not had the slightest news until that moment.

In the return international fixture in Bilbao, however, the Portuguese, without explanation (possibly either due to financial problems by the Portuguese Federation or due to the very severe corrective of the 5–1 that Spain had given to the Lusitanians and that made them fear a bad image in said tournament), never mentioned such an international tournament again.

=== Origins ===
Such a situation put the Spanish teams in difficulties, as they were going to find themselves with a costly void until those teams entered the Copa del Rey qualifiers. It was the clubs who moved quickly to propose another tournament, only with Spanish clubs, to cover the scheduled dates, but they were unable to reach an agreement due to Athletic Bilbao, who wanted to enjoy in that tournament the same benefits of "the compensations" that it enjoyed in the League, which represented no less than 25% of the box office of the venues that Athletic visited (possibly due the limited capacity at San Mamés, which had already led to protests from fans who had not been able to attend the international match with Portugal). The other teams refused such "tax" since they wanted everyone to assume their expenses and income, without any other obligation. During all of this, the Spanish Federation remained on the sidelines.

When there was another proposal that it be a tournament of four regional teams, instead of four clubs, the agreement somehow made its way between the teams. In Madrid, it was called "Tournament of Four" and in Barcelona: Copa Clasificados, because the champion of the Copa Generalissimo, Valencia CF, and the top three in the league championship took part: Club Atlético-Aviación as champion, Athletic Bilbao as runner-up and FC Barcelona as fourth in the league, because the third-place was Valencia. The teams paid for the trophy to be contested, each contributing the amount of 1,000 pesetas to pay the 4,000 that a cup costs in accordance with the entity of such competition.

The Portuguese League finished when this "President Cup" was going to start. They also had some empty dates left so they had no choice but to organize a tournament between their aforementioned teams and with the title of "Easter Cup".

== Tournament ==
It was played in a round-trip league format, with a total of twelve games (six per participating team). On the first matchday on 6 April 1941, the tournament already presented two extreme opposites, the thrill of an 8-goal classic between Athletic Bilbao and FC Barcelona and the disappointment of a postponement between Atlético-Aviación and Valencia CF. While the directors were discussing "whether they were greyhounds or hounds", Real Madrid and Valencia reached an agreement to hold two friendly matches, one in each city. Madrid went to Valencia the previous Sunday where they won 2–1 and the second leg was to be played on 6 April. Valencia tried to fix the return fixture, but the price demanded was too high since Madrid had already launched, several days before, all the advertising and ticketing; it was more economical to hold the match than to pay all those expenses incurred by Madrid. Valencia came to Madrid, thus postponing its participation in the "President Cup", which in Madrid was still called "Tournament of Four"; Valencia lost again, this time 3–2, and was now free to join the tournament. Atlético-Aviación tried to cover the date with a trip to compete against Sevilla FC, but was unsuccessful.

In the second matchday, the two Atléticos, Madrid and Bilbao, comfortably defeated Barcelona (6–0) and Valencia (3–0) respectively, with Pruden scoring a hat-trick for the former and Unamuno for the latter. On the third matchday, the home teams, Atlético-Aviation and Barcelona had to come from behind to get points, with the latter's being a very violent match that saw two red cards in the first half due to mutual aggression, Jaume Sospedra of Barça and Carlos Iturraspe of Valencia, and another one in the second half, Mundo for an attempted attack on Antonio Anguera. There was a time when the teams were playing with just eight players on the field due to injuries. Two of them, Josep Valle and Poli, did not come out again, while the others, Mariano Martín, Vicente Asensi, and Lelé, spent several minutes on the sideline nursing the wounds, curiously, all to their heads. Naturally, the Competition Committee took action on the matter and financially sanctioned the clubs, the coaches, and the referee, who was suspended for a month; handing out sanctions to Benito (indefinite suspension until the extent of Poli's injury is known), to Sospedra (two-game suspension and a fine of 250 pesetas), and to Iturraspe (three games and a fine of 250 pesetas).

The following matchdays were less notorious, except for Bilbao's 6–2 victory over Atlético-Aviación, partly thanks to a hat-trick from Hermenegildo Elices. On the sixth and final matchday, Barcelona, which was already out of reach from the title, defeated Bilbao 3–0 to imprint them the same fate. On the other hand, Valencia defeated Atlético-Aviación 2–0, but both teams could still win the title due to their postponed match.

== Results ==
6 April 1941 First matchday	Athletic Bilbao	5–3	FC Barcelona	Bilbao, Basque Country
	Unamuno 10'; Elices 26', 68', 78'; Panizo 60'	Report	Martín 32', 63'; Valle 79'	Stadium: San Mamés; Referee: (Basque Country (autonomous community)) Jáuregui Ansó

6 April 1941 First matchday	Atlético-Aviation	'Postponed'	Valencia CF
		Report

13 April 1941 Second matchday	Atlético-Aviation	6–0	FC Barcelona	Madrid
	Arencibia 38', 43'; Pruden 51' (pen.), 82', 88'; Campos 75'	Report1; Report2		Stadium: Vallecas; Referee: Mazagatos

13 April 1941 Second matchday	Athletic Bilbao	3–0	Valencia CF	Bilbao, Basque Country
	Unamuno 16', 58', 85'; Panizo 37' (miss)	Report		Stadium: San Mamés; Referee: Corpas

20 April 1941 Third matchday	Athletic-Aviation	2–1	Athletic Bilbao	Madrid
	Pruden 58'; Germán 63'	Report	Elices 23'	Stadium: Vallecas; Referee: Ferragut

20 April 1941 Third matchday	FC Barcelona	1–1	Valencia CF	Barcelona
	Valle 30'	Report	Poli 6'	Stadium: Camp de Les Corts; Referee: (Basque Country (autonomous community)) José Murguía Ortiz

27 April 1941 Fourth matchday	Valencia CF	4–0	FC Barcelona	Valencia
	Doménech 32', 50'; Asensi 68'; Botana 71'	Report		Stadium: Mestalla Stadium; Referee: (Community of Madrid) Escartín Morán
Note: Due to Escartín's weak refereeing, the match was a disaster; perhaps if it were a boxing match, the judge would have withheld the bag from the contestants due to lack of aggressiveness.

27 April 1941 Fourth matchday	Athletic Bilbao	6–2	Athletic-Aviation	Bilbao, Basque Country
	Elices 11', 42', 55'; Garate 21'; Iriondo 65'; Unamuno 66'	Report	Arencibia 7'; Pruden 24'	Stadium: San Mamés; Referee: (Catalonia) Tamarit Falaguera

2 May 1941 Fifth matchday	FC Barcelona	1–2	Athletic-Aviation	Barcelona
	Bravo 65'	Report	Pruden 9'; Manín 16'	Stadium: Camp de Les Corts; Referee: (Catalonia) Sanchis Orduña

2 May 1941 Fifth matchday	Valencia CF	3–0	Athletic Bilbao	Valencia
	Gorostiza 40', 70'; Mundo 87'	Report		Stadium: Mestalla Stadium; Referee: (Catalonia) Vilalta Bars

4 May 1941 Sixth matchday	Valencia CF	2–0	Athletic-Aviation	Valencia
	Mundo 14'; Doménech 15'	Report		Stadium: Mestalla Stadium; Referee: (Catalonia) Arribas Seijas

4 May 1941 Sixth matchday	FC Barcelona	3–0	Athletic Bilbao	Barcelona
	Llàcer 30'; Martín 40'; Vergara 49'	Report		Stadium: Camp de Les Corts; Referee: Álvarez Corriols

== 1947 match ==
The end of the scheduled days had been reached without there having been an opportunity to resolve that meeting that had been suspended since the first day, which was decisive for the final classification, with a slight advantage for Valencia, for whom a draw was enough to win the title, but with the disadvantage of having to go to a foreign field. The Copa del Rey began right after the tournament, so the match was postponed to the first stages of the following season, but it ended up not being held. It was only six years later that the new president of the federation, Armando Muñoz Calero, urged for this to end once and for all. The newspapers had to remember and give their readers the clue of said tournament, its results and the importance of that match that had been so separated from its origins.

The "final" was finally scheduled to serve as the opening match of the 1947–48 season on 14 September. Their six years of competition remain in the history of Spanish competitions as the record for the duration of a tournament, exactly six years and five months from the first match, which was played on 6 April 1941, to the last, on 14 September 1947. Almost everything was new. New Federation, since Saura had started it and Muñoz Calero finished it, leaving in between no less than two presidents, Javier Barroso and Jesús Rivero. One of the teams had started the tournament with the name Atlético-Aviación and ended it by calling itself Atlético Madrid, and the protagonists only had five "survivors": Alfonso Aparicio for the people of Madrid, and Juan Ramón, Asensi, Amadeo, and Mundo for the people of Valencia. The initial coaches were Ricardo Zamora and Ramón Encinas, but now they were led by Emilio Vidal and Luis Pasarín.

At the time, most players had extra pounds and less shape at the start of the season, and in Valencia, these defects were exacerbated by fatigue from a trip to Morocco from which they had just arrived. Both teams took advantage of the opportunity to test some recently acquired players, with Valencia testing goalkeeper Candi while Atlético tested José Luis Prado and Carlos Basabe. Atlético was better because they were interested in winning the cup; Valencia seemed to have forgotten about such a tournament and was not in a physical condition to generate that interest. The Madrid team thus won by a resounding 4–0 victory, and with a total of eight points, one more than the Valencians, they were declared the winner six years after the start of the tournament. The trophy was presented by Armando Muñoz Calero, the president of the Spanish Football Federation, who handed the cup to Atlético's team captain, Alfonso Aparicio.

== Result ==
14 September 1947 Sixth matchday	Atlético Madrid	4–0	Valencia CF	Madrid
	Basabe 4', 43'; Silva 51', 53' Pérez; Riera, Aparicio; Mencía, Arnau, Cuenca; Juncosa, Vidal, Silva, José Luis and Basabe	Report1; Report2	Candi; Sáenz, Juan Ramón; Santacatalina, Monzó, Asensi; Gago, Amadeo, Mundo, Morera, and Giraldós	Stadium: Metropolitano; Referee: Iturralde

== See also ==
- Copa Federación Centro
- Copa de los Campeones de España
- Copa Eva Duarte
