= Antonio Durán =

Spanish footballer and manager

Personal information
- Full name: Antonio Durán Durán
- Date of birth: August 19, 1924
- Place of birth: Arbúcies, Spain
- Date of death: January 11, 2009 (aged 84)
- Place of death: Åkersberga, Sweden
- Position: Midfielder

Senior career*
Years	Team	Apps	(Gls)
- RCD Córdoba
1948–1951	Atlético Madrid	5	(7)
1952–1954	Real Oviedo	19	(8)

Managerial career
- 1955: Wifsta/Östrand
- 1958–1960: Sandvikens IF
- 1960–1963: Åtvidabergs FF
- 1964–1971: Malmö FF
- 1972–1974: Djurgårdens IF
- 1975: Åtvidabergs FF
- * Club domestic league appearances and goals

Antonio Durán (19 August 1924 – 11 January 2009) was a Spanish footballer and manager. He is most notable for managing Malmö FF, being the club's most successful manager in terms of championships.

== Honours ==
=== Player ===
==== Atlético Madrid ====
- La Liga (2): 1949–50, 1950–51

=== Manager ===
==== Malmö FF ====
- Allsvenskan (4): 1965, 1967, 1970, 1971
- Svenska Cupen (1): 1967
