= José Sanchis =

José Sanchis may refer to:

- José Sanchís y Ferrandis (archbishop), archbishop of Tarragona 1346–1357
- José Sanchís y Ferrandis (bishop), bishop of Segorbe 1673–1679
- José Sanchís Bergón, first president of Organización Médica Colegial de España (1921)
- José Sanchis Grau (1932–2011), Spanish comic book writer
- José Sanchis Sinisterra (born 1940), Spanish playwright and theatre director
- José Salvador Sanchis (born 1963), Spanish road cyclist
