= Armando Muñoz Calero =

Spanish politician and military officer during World War II

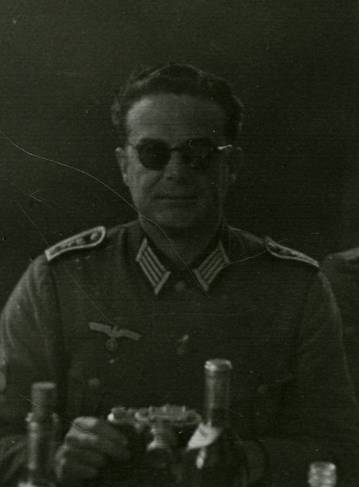
- Muñoz Calero during World War II.

Member of the Cortes Españolas
- In office 1946 – 1952; 1955 – 1958; 1964 – 1971

President of the Spanish Football Federation
- In office 1947–1950
- Preceded by: Jesús Rivero Meneses
- Succeeded by: Manuel Valdés Larrañaga

Personal details
- Born: Armando Muñoz Calero y López; 15 February 1908 Águilas, Spain
- Died: 8 November 1978 (aged 70) Madrid, Spain
- Party: FET y de las JONS
- Occupation: Politician, physician

Military service
- Allegiance: Nazi Germany
- Unit: Blue Division
- Battles/wars: World War II

Armando Muñoz Calero y López (15 February 1908 – 8 November 1978) was a Spanish physician and falangist politician. He was a member of the Cortes Españolas during the Francoist dictatorship, while he also served as president of the provincial government in Madrid and as deputy-mayor of the Madrid City Council.

== Biography ==
Armando Muñoz Calero was born on 15 February 1908 in Águilas, Murcia. A trained physician, he worked in Lorca for a time.

A hardline falangist who held the post of FET y de las JONS' national's inspector of health, Muñoz Calero joined the Blue Division siding with Nazi Germany to fight the Soviet Union in the Eastern Front of World War II. He served as a front-line surgeon in the division's medical corps. From 15 February 1943 to 14 January 1946, he presided over the managing committee (comisión gestora) that controlled the Provincial Deputation of Madrid. He chaired the Organización Médica Colegial from 1945 to 1946.

He was a member of the Cortes Españolas from 1946 to 1952, again from 1955 to 1958 (in his capacity as National Chief of the Obra Sindical "18 de Julio"), and finally from 1964 to 1971 (as a member of the National Council of the Movement). He became the president of the Spanish Football Federation on 20 May 1947. He left the later office in 1950 and was replaced by Manuel Valdés Larrañaga.

He would go on to hold the vice-presidency of the Atlético de Madrid in the 1960s. He died on 8 November 1978 in Madrid.

Political offices
Preceded by Luis Nieto Antúnez	President of the Provincial Deputation of Madrid (managing committee); 1943–1946	Succeeded by Antonio Almagro Méndez
Sporting positions
Preceded by Jesús Rivero Meneses	President of the Spanish Football Federation; 1947–1950	Succeeded by Manuel Valdés Larrañaga
Non-profit organization positions
Preceded by Mariano Gómez Ulla	President of the Organización Médica Colegial; 1945–1946	Succeeded by Carlos González Bueno
