= Carlos Basabe =

Spanish footballer (1918–1991)

Personal information
- Full name: Carlos Pedro Basabe Tovar
- Date of birth: 10 June 1924
- Place of birth: Deusto, Spain
- Date of death: 28 August 1994 (aged 70)
- Place of death: Spain
- Position: Forward

Senior career*
Years	Team	Apps	(Gls)
1943–1944	Barakaldo		
1944–1945	Cultural de Durango		
1945–1947	Gimnástica Burgalesa		
1947–1949	Atlético Madrid	21	(2)
1949–1952	Real Sociedad	31	(11)
1952–1954	Real Oviedo	51	(17)
1954–1955	Levante		
Total		103	(31)
- * Club domestic league appearances and goals

Carlos Pedro Basabe Tovar (10 June 1924 – 28 August 1994) was a Spanish footballer who played as a forward for Atlético Madrid, Real Sociedad, and Real Oviedo. In total, he scored 31 goals in 103 La Liga matches.

He was also a military champion in the 100 metres.

== Early life ==
Carlos Basabe was born on 10 June 1924 in Deusto, Biscay, as the son of Carlos Basabe (1905–83), a footballer who played for Athletic Bilbao and Real Zaragoza.

== Career ==
Basabe began his career in 1943, aged 19, at his hometown clubs Barakaldo, then in the Segunda División, from which he joined Cultural de Durango, where he played the 1944–45 season in the Tercera División. In 1945, he joined fellow third division team Gimnástica Burgalesa, with whom he played for two years, from 1945 until 1947, when he was signed for Atlético Madrid. He made his debut with the first team on 4 May 1947, in the decisive match of the 1941–47 FEF President Cup, the longest tournament in the history of Spanish football, which had been in stand by since 1941, scoring twice to help his side to a 4–0 victory over Valencia. He stayed at Atlético for two years, from 1947 until 1949, scoring a total of two goals in 24 official matches.

In 1949, Basabe joined Real Sociedad, making his debut on 9 October 1949 in a league fixture against Deportivo de La Coruña, which ended in a 0–1 loss. In his first season there, he was a starter, scoring six goals in 20 La Liga games, but he then lost relevance in the following two seasons; in total, he scored 11 goals in 35 official matches (including 30 in the league), which ended in 13 victories, 11 draws, and 11 losses. During his time at Sociedad, he won 20,000 pesetas from the tenth ticket purchased in Barcelona during his trip to face CE Júpiter.

In 1952, Basabe went to Real Oviedo, who had just been promoted to the top-flight, where he stayed for two seasons as a starting striker, scoring 17 goals in 51 league matches. The team was relegated in the 1953–54 season, after which he left the club, playing his last football at Levante, where he retired in 1955, aged 31. In total, he scored 31 goals in 103 La Liga matches.

== Death ==
Basabe died on 28 August 1994, at the age of 70.

== Honours ==
Atlético Madrid

- FEF President Cup
  - Champions (1): 1941–47
