= Manuel Torres (footballer, born 1926) =

Spanish footballer and manager (1926–2006)

Personal information
- Full name: Manuel Torres Díaz
- Date of birth: 26 May 1926
- Place of birth: Las Palmas, Canary Islands, Spain
- Date of death: 13 April 2006 (aged 79)
- Place of death: Las Palmas, Canary Islands, Spain
- Position: Midfielder

Youth career
- 1939–1940: Tenerife
- 1940–1942: Unión Betis

Senior career*
Years	Team	Apps	(Gls)
1942–1945	Real Hespérides		
1945–1947	Real Club Victoria		
1947–1949	Atlético Madrid		
1949–1951	Málaga		
1951–1959	Las Palmas	137	(29)
1959–1960	Málaga		

International career
1950	Spain	0	(0)

Managerial career
- 1970–1972: Las Palmas (Youth)
- * Club domestic league appearances and goals

Manuel Torres Díaz (26 May 1926 – 13 April 2006) was a Spanish footballer who played as a midfielder for Atlético Madrid, Málaga, and Las Palmas, for whom he scored a total of 56 goals in 193 La Liga matches between 1947 and 1959. In 1950, he was selected to represent Spain in the 1950 FIFA World Cup, but a last-minute injury prevented him from becoming the first international player in Málaga's history.

After retiring, he briefly worked as a coach, leading the youth side of Las Palmas to a triumph in the 1971 Youth Copa del Rey.

== Early life and education ==
Manuel Torres was born in Las Palmas, Canary Islands, on 26 May 1926, (Note: Some sources wrongly claim that he was born on 19 March 1927.) as the son of Manuel Torres Gutiérrez and Victoria Díaz Quintero, who had married in El Hierro before settling in Las Palmas, where they ran a bar-restaurant called Minerva on Las Canteras Beach. He began playing football with a ball made of socks and knotted clothing, training for so many hours that sometimes he even forgot to return home. At the time, he and his friends had many vacant lots to play football on, such as the city's streets, which were long, wide, and with barely any vehicles in circulation, making goals out of stones.

Torres began playing football matches in the spacious schoolyard of the Franciscan Fathers School on Padre Cueto Street, next to Las Canteras Beach, featuring alongside the likes of Gilberto Beneyto, José Padrón, and Alfonso Silva; he later stated that he "had never seen a Canary Island player with Silva's quality". He was then registered in the youth ranks of a team called Tenerife, which had been created by a group of kids who lived near the Plaza del Puerto neighborhood, and which was presided by a municipal guard named Pepito.

Torres then joined the youth ranks of Unión Betis, where he first met Beneyto, a player who had a very similar sporting path, as they went on to play alongside each other at Unión Betis, Real Hespérides, Real Club Victoria, CD Málaga, and eventually signing for UD Las Palmas together, which resulted in almost a parallel career. Despite showing good academic qualities at the Ramiro de Maeztu School, located next to the Teatro Cine del Puerto, he still preferred football, much to his parents' dismay, who saw in him potential to achieve professional and social prestige.

== Playing career ==
=== Early career ===
In 1942, the 16-year-old Torres was approached by Real Hespérides, a regional championship team whose center forward was injured, and after lengthy discussions, the club managed to sign him for 200 pesetas a month. He made his official debut with the first team at the Estadio Pepe Gonçalvez, shortly before a youth team match at Estadio Guanarteme, but his youth coach did not allow him to play due to his clear exhaustion. In his first season at the club, he helped his side achieve promotion from the second division of the regional championship to the first.

In 1945, the 19-year-old Torres was approached by the president of Real Club Victoria, the pharmacist Vicente López Socas, who convinced him to sign for his club, although he was later prohibited to play by a member from the Frente de Juventudes due to his age.

=== Atlético Madrid ===
In 1947, Torres's football skills were spotted by Arsenio Arocha, a scout for Atlético Madrid who had come to Las Palmas with the sole intention of signing Alfonso Silva, so Atlético ended up signing both. Once in the capital, the two Canarians stayed in the same boarding house in the Argüelles neighborhood, which was located a few kilometers from the Estadio Metropolitano, with their daily journey to there proving challenging during the winters. They soon formed a friendship, developing great complicity both on and off the field as they were both cerebral, calm, and creative.

At the time, the young Torres had been a standout player on every team he had been, so he became highly discouraged when he failed to become a regular starter at Atlético, spending most matches on the bench, not to mention that it was his first time away from his family. Despite some attempts to adapt more quickly and improve his fitness, such as playing in a tournament for the club's B team where he featured alongside the likes of Julián Cuenca, Torres eventually failed to do so and decided to leave the club in 1949. In total, he only played 5 official matches for Atlético, four in La Liga, and one in the Copa del Rey.

=== CD Málaga ===
Despite having great financial offers from Real Sociedad, Real Zaragoza, and Real Valladolid, Torres ultimately decided to accept the offer from Málaga in 1949, not only because that region had better weather, but also because he had recently scored a hat-trick for Atlético in a friendly against them at La Rosaleda (4–1). In his first season at Málaga (1949–50), he was the team's top scorer with 18 goals, including 15 in La Liga, thus being one of league's top scorers, alongside the likes of Telmo Zarra and César. Therefore, the national coach Guillermo Eizaguirre decided to call him up for the Spain national team that was going to the 1950 World Cup in Rio de Janeiro, but a serious knee injury sustained in a preparation match in honor of a Melilla player prevented his distinction becoming the first international player in Málaga's history.

In his second season at the club, Torres scored 19 goals in 34 official matches, which was not enough to prevent the team from being relegated to the Segunda División. At the start of his third season at Málaga, he immediately felt the difference in quality, so after only 2 goals in 5 matches, he signed for the newly founded top-flight club, Las Palmas. By the end of that season, however, Las Palmas was relegated to the second division, while Málaga had returned to the top-flight after winning the 1951–52 Segunda División, to which he contributed with those 5 matches.

=== Las Palmas ===
Torres made his debut for Las Palmas within days of his signing, on 14 October 1951, scoring a brace, including a free-kick, to help his side to a 4–1 win over Atlético Tetuán. Two years after their relegation, Torres helped Las Palmas win the 1953–54 Segunda División, thus returning to the top-flight, where he played for the next five years, until 1959. In total, he scored 55 goals in 204 matches for Las Palmas, including 29 goals in 137 La Liga matches. In total, he scored 56 goals in 193 La Liga matches for Atlético, Málaga, and Las Palmas, including four league hat-tricks, three with Málaga and one with Las Palmas, the latter coming on 13 April 1952, in a 4–2 win over Real Zaragoza, but he also netted hat-tricks in the second division, including one against Alcoyano; in the following day, the cover of the local newspaper La Hoja del Lunes featured the headline: TORRES 3-ALCOYANO 1.

Every time he was fouled, the entire stadium would scream Que la tire Torres! ("Let Torres throw it!"), as a reference to his prowess at taking free-kicks and penalties, so much so that he was considered among the best free-kick takers in the world by the likes of Helenio Herrera and Ferdinand Daučík. He often had excellent performances against Barcelona, a club that was interested in his services, because their close marking usually resulted in good free kicks, which Barça goalkeeper Antoni Ramallets found hard to stop. Furthermore, his midfield partnership with Manuel Naranjo was considered the best midfield line in Spain, along with Mauri-Maguregui.

== Managerial career ==
After his career as a player ended, Torres remained linked to Las Palmas, now as a coach of the club's youth team, which he oversaw in the early 1970s, winning the Youth Copa del Rey in 1971 after beating Real Madrid 1–2 in the final at the Santiago Bernabéu Stadium.

== Death ==
Torres died on 13 April 2006, at the age of 80.

== Honours ==
Málaga

- Segunda División:
  - Champions (1): 1951–52

Las Palmas

- Segunda División:
  - Champions (1): 1953–54

== See also ==
- List of La Liga hat-tricks
