= 1940 FEF President Cup =

Subchampions Tournament

Tournament details
- Country: Spain
- Dates: 17 March – 5 May 1940
- Teams: 5

Final positions
- Champions: CD Malacitano (1st title)
- Runners-up: Atletico Osasuna

Tournament statistics
- Matches played: 20
- Goals scored: 90 (4.5 per match)
- Top goal scorer: César (10 goals)

The 1940 FEF President Cup (Spanish: Copa Presidente FEF de 1940), also called Second Division Consolation Tournament or Subchampions Tournament, was a football competition held from 17 March to 5 May 1940. Organized by the Royal Spanish Football Federation (RFEF), it was conceived to be played by the second-placed teams of each of the five groups that made up the 1939–40 Segunda División, while the champions of each group qualified for the final phase that awarded the title of champion and the right to direct promotion.

The competition was played in the form of a league with each team facing their opponents twice, with a total of 20 matches played, and the winner of the tournament was CD Malacitano (currently known as Málaga CF) with 14 points, one more than runner-up Atletico Osasuna.

== Participants ==
1940 FEF President Cup was initially intended to be contested by the second-placed teams of each of the five groups that made up that year's second division; however, Racing de Ferrol, second in Group I and therefore the represent of Galician Federation, did not participate in the competition, giving up its place to the third best-ranked team in the five groups, which turned out to be CD Malacitano of Group V, the eventual champions.

Clubs	Town	Federation
(Navarre) Atletico Osasuna	Pamplona	Navarre Football Federation
(Catalonia) CD Sabadell	Sabadell	Catalan Football Federation
(Community of Madrid) AD Ferroviaria	Madrid	Royal Madrid Football Federation
(Andalusia) Recreativo de Granada	Granada	Royal Andalusian Football Federation
(Andalusia) CD Malacitano	Málaga	Royal Andalusian Football Federation

== Final classification ==
On the 10th and final matchday on 5 May 1940, both Osasuna and Malacitano walked into their home stadium with the chance of winning their first-ever piece of silverware; Malacitano only needed to do better than the opponent. In the end, both teams won their respective match, with Osasuna beating Granada 3–0, while Malacitano defeated Ferroviaria 5–2, courtesy of a first-half brace from Juan Mesa and a second-half hat-trick from Tavilo.

Pos	Team	Pld	W	D	L	GF	GA	GD	Pts	Qualification or relegation
1	Club Deportivo Malacitano	8	5	2	1	27	13	+14	12	Champion
2	CA Osasuna	8	5	1	2	18	12	+6	11	
3	CD Sabadell	8	2	2	4	18	21	−3	6	
4	AD Ferroviaria	8	3	0	5	16	21	−5	6	
5	Recreativo de Granada	8	2	1	5	11	23	−12	5	

Source: bdfutbol
Rules for classification: 1) points; 2) head-to-head points; 3) head-to-head goal difference; 4) goal difference; 5) number of goals scored; 6) fair-play points; 7) playoff match

== Statistics ==
The top scorer of the tournament was Sabadell's César, who would later become the all-time top scorer of FC Barcelona (since been broken by Lionel Messi).

=== Top goalscorers ===
Rank	Name	Team	Goals
1	(Spain) César	CD Sabadell	10
2	(Spain) Julián Vergara	CA Osasuna	9
3	(Spain) Tomás Díez	CD Malacitano	4
3	(Spain) Moleiro	AD Ferroviaria	4
3	(Spain) Juan Mesa	CD Malacitano	4

== Post match ==
Club Deportivo Malacitano, which became known as Club Deportivo Málaga in 1941, went on to achieve promotion to La Liga in 1949 under the presidency of Manuel Navarro Nogueroles, and then win a Second Division title in 1951–52.

== See also ==
- Copa Federación Centro
- Copa de los Campeones de España
- Copa Eva Duarte
