= Concep Cañadell =

Catalan politician

Member of the Congress of Deputies of Spain
- Incumbent
- Assumed office 3 December 2019
- Constituency: Lleida

Mayor of Térmens
- Incumbent
- Assumed office 2015
- Preceded by: Francesc Sangrà i Pascual

Member of Térmens Municipal Council
- Incumbent
- Assumed office 2007

Personal details
- Born: Concepció Cañadell i Salvia; 1978 (age 47–48)
- Party: Catalan European Democratic Party
- Other political affiliations: Together for Catalonia
- Education: University of Lleida

Concepció Cañadell i Salvia (born 1978) is a Catalan politician and a member of the Congress of Deputies of Spain.

== Early life ==
Cañadell was born in 1978. She has diplomas in labour relations and business from the University of Lleida.

== Career ==
Cañadell contested the 2007 local elections as a Convergence and Union (CiU) electoral alliance candidate in Térmens and was elected. She was re-elected at the 2011 local elections. She was re-elected at the 2015 local elections and became mayor of Térmens. She was re-elected at the 2019 local elections. Cañadell was president of Noguera County Council from 2015 to 2019.

At the April 2019 general election Cañadell was placed second on the Together for Catalonia (JuntsxCat) electoral alliance's list of candidates in the Province of Lleida but the alliance only managed to win one seat in the province and as a result she failed to get elected. She contested the November 2019 general election as a JuntsxCat electoral alliance candidate in the Province of Lleida and was elected to the Congress of Deputies.

== Personal life ==
Cañadell is married.

== Electoral history ==
Electoral history of Concep Cañadell
| Election | Constituency | Party | Alliance | No. | Result |
|---|---|---|---|---|---|
| 2007 local | Térmens | Democratic Convergence of Catalonia | Convergence and Union | 1 | Elected |
| 2011 local | Térmens | Democratic Convergence of Catalonia | Convergence and Union | 1 | Elected |
| 2015 local | Térmens | Democratic Convergence of Catalonia | Convergence and Union | 1 | Elected |
| 2019 April general | Province of Lleida | Catalan European Democratic Party | Together for Catalonia | 2 | Not elected |
| 2019 local | Térmens | Catalan European Democratic Party | Together for Térmens | 1 | Elected |
| 2019 November general | Province of Lleida | Catalan European Democratic Party | Together for Catalonia | 1 | Elected |
