= Térmens =

- Municipality
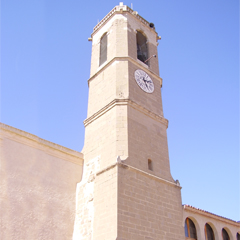
- Tower of St. John's church

- Flag Coat of arms

- Location in Catalonia
- Coordinates: 41°43′10″N 0°45′42″E
- Country: Spain
- Community: Catalonia
- Province: Lleida
- Comarca: Noguera

Government
  - Mayor: Concep Cañadell (2015)

Area
  - Total: 27.5 km^{2} (10.6 sq mi)

Population (2025-01-01)
  - Total: 1,350
  - Density: 49.1/km^{2} (127/sq mi)
- Website: www.ccnoguera.cat/termens

Térmens (Catalan pronunciation: [ˈteɾmens]) is a village in the province of Lleida and autonomous community of Catalonia, Spain. It has a population of 1,350 (register office, 2025).
