= Organización Médica Colegial de España =

Spanish Medical Colleges Organization
- Organización Médica Colegial de España
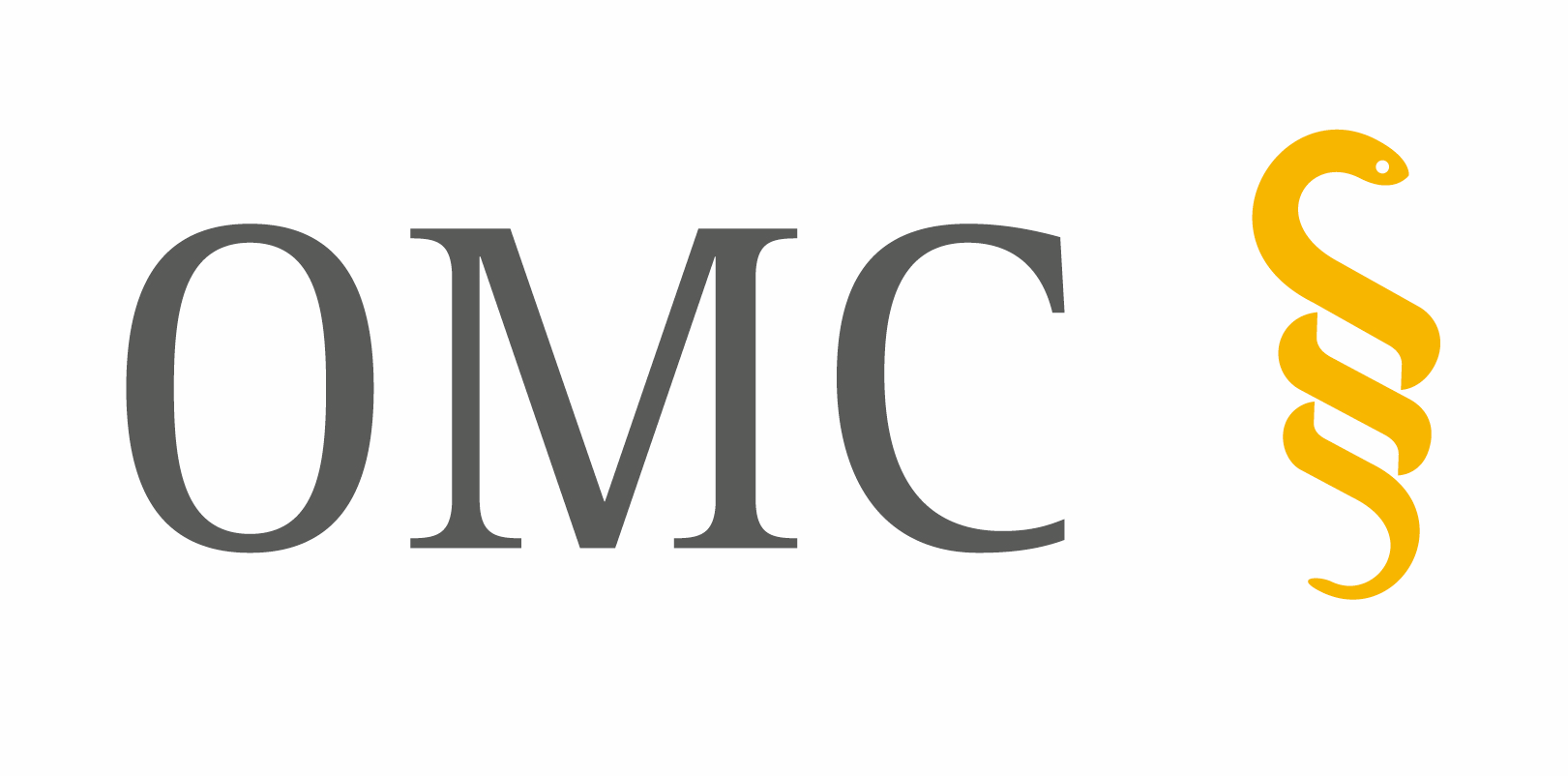
- Abbreviation: OMC
- Formation: January 1, 1921; 105 years ago
- Location: Spain
- Coordinates: 40°24′57.24″N 3°41′49.49″W
- Region served: Madrid; Plaza de las Cortes, 11
- Members: 260.588 (2018)
- Official language: Spanish
- President: Serafín Romero Agüit
- Website: www.cgcom.es

The Spanish Medical Colleges Organization (Organización Médical Colegial or OMC) is a Spanish organization whose purpose is to regulate the Spanish medical profession. The organization comprises the General Council of Official Medical Colleges (Consejo General de Colegios Oficiales de Médicos or CGCOM) and the Spanish regional medical colleges. Its role is to represent all the registered doctors, ensuring proper standards and promoting an ethical medical practice.

== Responsibilities ==
The CGCOM is the governing body that coordinates and represents the 52 local medical colleges at national and international levels. Its role is to represent, organize and defend the medical profession.

Within the General Council, there is a Permanent Commission that is in charge of its administration and management. It manages any plans or projects agreed by the General Assembly and it also deals with administration and management issues of the General Council and its Human Resources department. Currently there are five members of the Permanent Commission.

== Organization ==
The General Assembly is the highest power within the CGCOM and it is constituted by all 52 presidents of the local Medical Colleges, the members of the Permanent Commission, the national representatives of the College sections, representative members of the University, the scientific societies and other medical institutions. These medical institutions will join in following invitation by the assembly and will have a say but no right to vote.

The College sections are the different committees within each local College that get doctors together according to the modality of their medical practice. These committees are in charge of providing advice regarding their own specialties as well as organising suggestions or audits on the appropriate issues set up by nominated working groups.

The national representatives of the different college sections are as follows:

- Rural General Practice
- Inner city General Practice
- Dependent private practice
- Independent private practice
- Doctors with poor employment contracts
- Doctors in public administration
- Hospital doctors
- Training doctors
- Retired doctors

=== Departments and Trusts ===
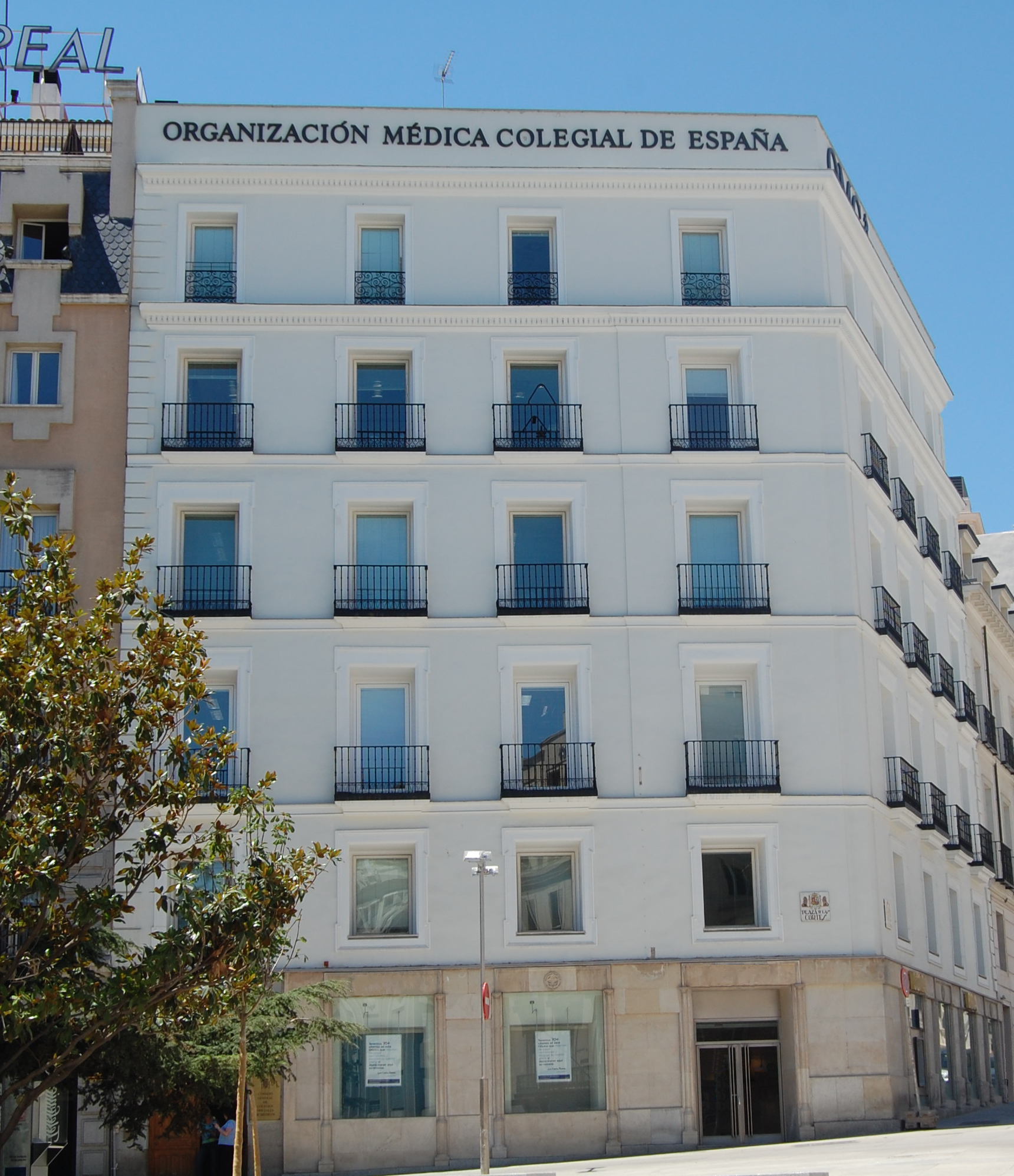
Organización Médica Colegial de España

General working groups

- Working group on ethics, medical law and working permits
- International issues
- Technology
- Working group on organization rules
- Working group on budgets
- Working group on news release and the OMC journal
- Working group on nursing prescription
- Working group on violence against doctors
- Working group on terminal care and 21st century medical ethics
- Area of relationship with non-medical professionals
- Area of relationship with Patients Associations
- Area of relationship with non-traditional-medicine practitioners
- Area of relationship with the University
- Area of relationship with the pharmaceutical industry
- Area of relationship with business companies
- Area of relationship with medical insurance companies
- Area of relationship with scientific societies
- Medical harm evaluation board
- New technologies working group.

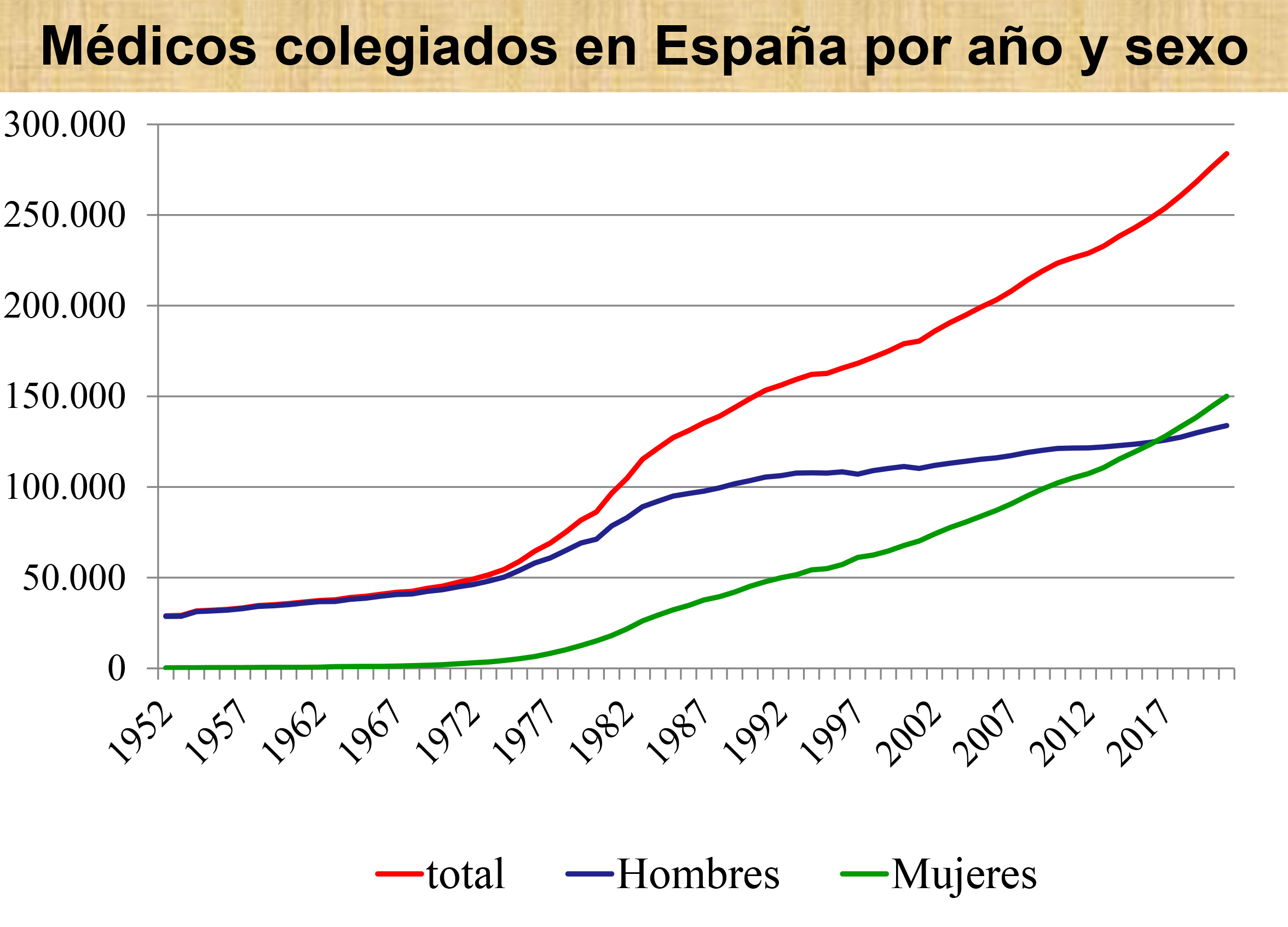
Evolution of licensing from 1952 to 2021.

Working groups within the committees

- Public health
- Sexually transmitted diseases (STDs)
- AIDS and smoking (in General Practice)
- Terminology (for private practice)

Trusts

- Medical Colleges Organization training board
- Medical orphans Trust and social medical protection (Principe de Asturias)
- Group of colleges for charity

== Publications ==
The OMC publishes books and journals that allow Spanish doctors to stay up to date with information and news on professional issues. It also publishes audits, documents and reports of general interest for the medical profession.

== History ==
In 1875, King Alfonso XII signed a law that made it compulsory for doctors working in Madrid and other Royal Places to be part of a register. This eventually became the basic structure for the creation of the medical colleges. The first Spanish medical colleges were formally established in 1894.

Compulsory registration for all doctors was debated between 1898 and 1900 but wasn’t established till 1917.

From 1893 there was a growing need amongst the medical profession to create a professional association and with this in mind, the local colleges were founded. The general organization of Medical Colleges (Organización Médical Colegial or OMC) was created soon after.

A school for orphans of medical parents (Colegio Principe de Asturias) was founded on May 15, 1917.

In October 1918, a first attempt to get the Heads of the Colleges to meet together had to be canceled due to the flu epidemic at the time; the unsuccessful date was chosen to coincide with a Medical National Meeting. It wasn’t until January 1919 that representatives from 33 local colleges finally met in the first ever general assembly. During that historic meeting they discussed issues such as pensions for the relatives of all those doctors deceased during the flu epidemic and also general issues about the medical profession. They created an executive committee based in Madrid and led by Dr Augusto Almazara and they agreed to meet again later on.

The Medical College of the city of Valencia requested an assembly of Spanish Medical Colleges and this was organized on 6 November 1920. On this date the Federation of Spanish Medical Colleges was founded creating a National Directory.

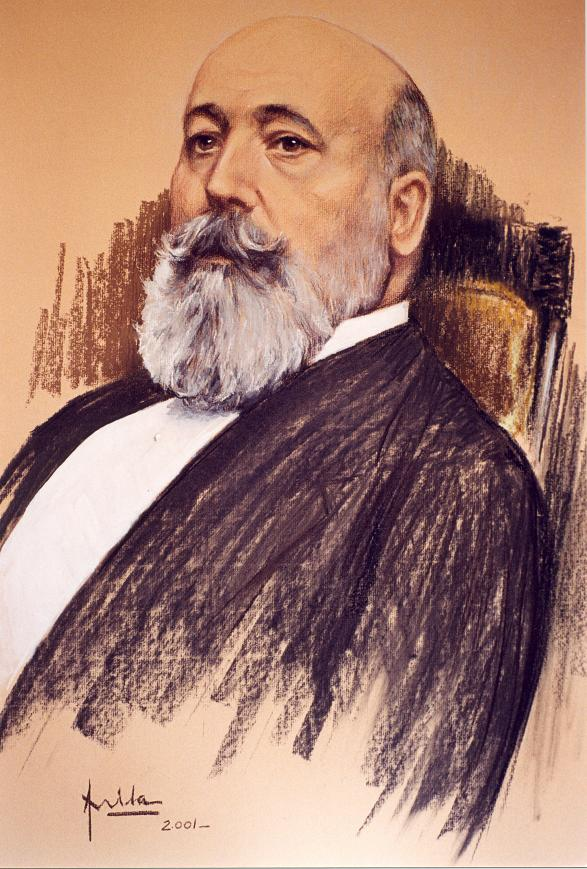
Dr. José Sanchís Bergón, first President of the OMC in Spain.

During the next several years the Federation evolved to establish some formal rules when it came to sanction doctors or to settle disagreement between the administration and the Colleges.

In January 1930, a General Assembly took place in Barcelona and it was chaired by Dr Perez Mateos. During this meeting a project to study the country medical needs (Proyecto de Previsión Nacional) and the statute were signed off. At this point, the General Council of the Medical Colleges becomes the absolute leader to organize a link between regional Colleges, public administration, official organizations and the registered doctors. From this date it becomes the only accepted official institution that represents doctors in Spain.

At the very beginning of the Spanish Civil War, in July 1936, the Ministry of Work and Health dissolved the existing Colleges organization. By 1937, the Republic had constituted the Association of Medical Professionals and by August, the general Government had created a Permanent Commission that reported directly to the Health General Headquarters.

After the war in 1940 and under the dictatorship of General Franco, new laws for the functioning of the General Council of the Medical Colleges were instituted. In 1946 a new set of internal rules was established including 22 deontological principles.

Then in 1963 the rules of the Council were renewed introducing some fundamental changes. Under the new rules, the assembly was composed of the Presidents of each of the local colleges rather than by a representative group of their members. A voting system was introduced so that the registered doctors themselves could choose their representatives, who could then choose the members of the General Council. The term Organización Médica Colegial was adopted as the name of this organization. By 1967 the official state document announced that the OMC is a guild within public law and is fully independent from the Health Administration.

The arrival of democracy in Spain brought intense political changes. In 1980 some new medical statutes were approved; the main novelty being that the representatives of the sections within the colleges had their right to voice and vote, and furthermore, all registered doctors can take part in general elections to choose the members of the Council. It becomes compulsory for every College to have its own named ethics group.

Further changes were introduced during the following years (2006–2010) which have greatly changed the organization. The most remarkable ones have been the tasks and responsibilities of the Autonomy Groups, the incorporation of medical students to the organization, the incompatibility of jobs within the Permanent Commission and the time limit to the responsibility posts. The aim remains to update the General Council to the reality of the current medical profession.

The organization was responsible for several public awareness efforts during the 2009 flu pandemic in Spain.

== See also ==
- Madrid
- Medical ethics
- Medical colleges
- Medical profession
- Spain
- Consejo Estatal de Estudiantes de Medicina
