= Manuel Torres (sculptor) =

Manuel "Manolo" Torres (Malaga, 1938 — Geneva, 19 January 2018) was a Spanish sculptor.

He is mostly known for monumental sculptures made of stainless steel, essentially abstract but retaining symbolic meaning. Torres spent his entire career in the Canton of Geneva, where a number of his work is on display in public spaces.

== Biography ==
=== Family ===
Torres was born in Malaga to a family of fishermen and factory workers. After emigrating to Geneva, he married Maria Guerrero at some point prior to 1970.

=== Metal worker ===
Torres decided to become a boilermaker after observing the work of Romani blacksmiths. He then studied the trade at Malaga professional school.

In 1960, Torres left Spain to seek employment in Geneva. He was soon hired as a metal worker at Ateliers des Charmilles, and employed at building machine prototypes.

=== Artist ===
While working at the Charmilles workshop, Torres started building his first iron sculptures as a self-taught artist. He built himself an unofficial workshop where he started welding a variety of metal refuse, gifting his work to his wife.

Starting in 1964, and more in the 70s, Torres took part in exhibits in Switzerland, Spain, France and Austria. In 1965 he was introduced into the artistic circles of Geneva through his friend Henri Presset.

In 1971, Torres had a large commission from the Fédération suisse des travailleurs de la métallurgie et de l'horlogerie (FTMH, now Unia), and he left the Charmilles workshop to focus exclusively on sculpture. He settled his workshop at Eaumorte, in Avully. He also took part in artistic panels, and taught masterclasses in French-speaking Switzerland.

In the 1980s, he was commissioned for monumental works of art in the public space in Geneva, as well as in Bienne, Delémont, Schaffhausen and Madrid.

== Personality ==
In 1978, Torrès said of his immigrant background: "first, it is euphorising to earn wages that would be unimaginable in Spain and to be in a position to spend without worry. But little by little you start realising the relationship between the two countries: if Switzerland enjoys such a material plenty, is might well be through poverty in other countries". According to journalist Michel Mohr, who interviewed him, Torres' sculptures "are to a degree a sublimation of his factory work".

After Torres died, art journalist Samuel Schellenberg said that he had a "playful and endearing personality".

== Works ==
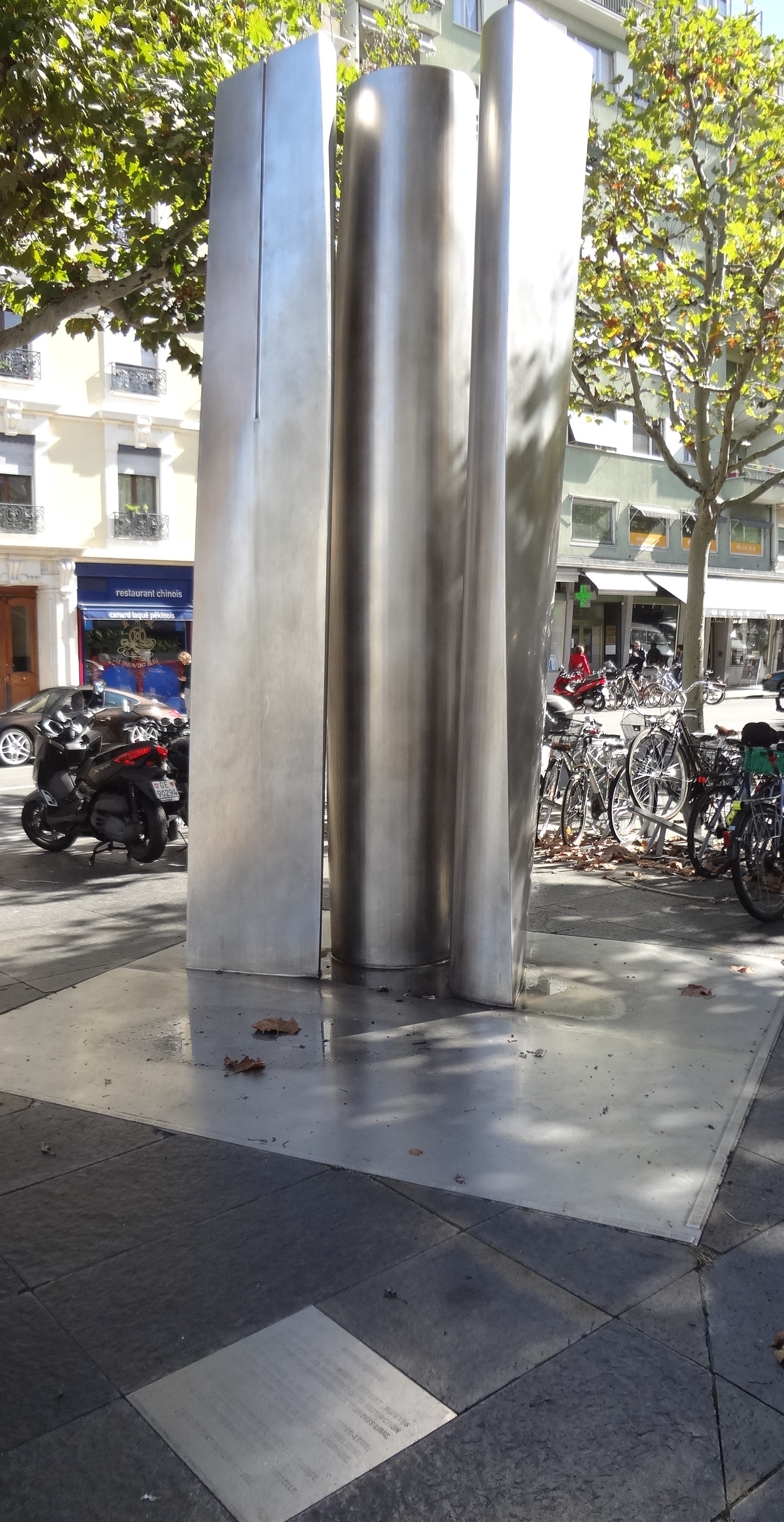
Hommage to Swiss Brigadists, 2000.

In 1980, Torres won the competition for a statue to be offered by Geneva for the independaence of the canton of Jura. The work, named Acero, was inaugurated in Delémont in 1981.

In 1990, he built a fountain named Miroir lunaire at Collège de Staël in Carouge, after winning a competition organised by the Fonds cantonal de décoration et d'art visuel.

In 2000, upon a commission of the City of Geneva, he built a memorial in homage to the Brigadists, "Swiss combatants who fought for the defence of liberty and democracy in Spain (1936–1938)". A commemorative plaque near the monument bears a quote by Dolores Ibárruri. The monument is installed at the end of Dancet Avenue, in the Plainpalais neighbourhood in Geneva. The monument was commissioned after a 1996 decision of the Municipal Council, for the 60th anniversary of the International Brigades.

In 2003, Torres won the first prize of a competition by the Senate of Spain for the 25th anniversary of the 1978 Constitution of Spain. He then made 19 bronze copies of Fuente de los Sueños ("Fountain of Dreams"), one for each of the provincial parliaments of Spain.

== General and cited references ==
- Bauzin, Karine, and Marie-Claire Lescaze. "Manuel Torres". Portraits-ge.ch : 30 genevois mais connus, Genève, Slatkine, 2003, 72 p. ISBN 9782832100882
- Marguerat, Florence; Jean Mohr; César Quintana (1998). Manuel Torres (in French). p. 107.
- Mohr, Michel (5 April 1978). "Le sculpteur Manolo Torrès". Journal de Genève (in French). p. 17.
- Rey, Paula (2001). La sculpture monumentale publique de Manuel Torres à Genève [Mémoire de licence] (in French). Université de Genève, Faculté des Lettres. p. 104.
- Schellenberg, Samuel (29 January 2018). "Manolo Torres n'est plus". Le Courrier (in French).
