= Julián Cuenca =

Spanish footballer (1923–1969)

Personal information
- Full name: Julián Cuenca Sánchez
- Date of birth: 14 November 1923
- Place of birth: Madrid, Spain
- Date of death: 3 February 1969 (aged 45)
- Height: 1.68 m (5 ft 6 in)
- Position: Midfielder

Senior career*
Years	Team	Apps	(Gls)
1943–1944	Imperio CF		
1944–1947	Atlético Aviación		
1947–1950	Atlético Madrid		
1950–1957	Deportivo de La Coruña	135	(11)
- * Club domestic league appearances and goals

Julián Cuenca Sánchez (14 November 1923 – 3 February 1969) was a Spanish footballer who played as a midfielder for Atlético Madrid and Deportivo de La Coruña.

== Career ==
Born in Madrid, Cuenca began playing football at his hometown club first in Mediodía and later in Imperio CF in 1943, which at the time served as a subsidiary of Atlético Madrid, who signed him in 1944, and he turned out to be one of the revelations of the colchonero team in that season. He spent the rest of his entire career in the Spanish First Division, playing with Atlético for six years until 1950 and then with Deportivo de La Coruña for seven years until 1957.

At Atlético, he won the league title in 1949–50, and also the 1941–47 FEF President Cup, the longest tournament in the history of Spanish football, playing in the decisive match against Valencia CF in 1947, which had been on standby since 1941, featuring in defense alongside Aparicio and keeping a clean sheet in a 4–0 win. For the colchonero side, he played 108 competitive matches, including 95 in the league, and scored 7 goals for the club, all of which were in the league; at Deportivo, he scored 11 goals in 135 competitive matches, which were all in the league, so in total, Cuenca scored 18 goals in 230 league matches.

On 29 May 1955, Cuenca received a tribute at the Estadio Riazor with a friendly match between Brazilian club Vasco da Gama and Deportivo, which was reinforced by the likes of Alfredo Di Stéfano, as well as the Celtics Pablo Olmedo and Carlos Torres, although Deportivo still lost 1–6.

== Style of play ==
Cuenca was seen as a good ball handler, with measured passes into space, being very difficult to intercept. He was also noted to be very respectful on and off the field.

== Death ==
After retiring, Cuenca set up a sports equipment establishment in La Coruña next to his colleague Waldo Botana. Cuenca died in Madrid on 3 February 1969, at the age of 45, as a result of cancer.

== Honours ==
Atlético Madrid

- FEF President Cup: 1941–47
- La Liga: 1949–50
