= Consejo Estatal de Estudiantes de Medicina =

Spanish Council of Medical Students
- Abbreviation: CEEM
- Headquarters: Plaza de las Cortes, 11; 28014 Madrid (Sede de la OMC)
- Location: Spain
- Coordinates: 40°24′57″N 3°41′49″W
- Region served: Spain
- Website: www.ceem.org.es
- Remarks: +34 914 317 780 (Ext. 120)

The Spanish Council of Medical Students (CEEM, from its initials in Spanish) is a university, political and nonprofit association without link with any party, and formed by all students' representatives of Spanish Medicine Faculties in line with the organization's statutes.

== Field, aims and relations ==
The Spanish Council of Medical Students is the body that holds the legitimate/lawful and only representation of Spanish national and medical students, and so it is recognized by national and international institutions which it works with. It is formed with university, politic, secular character, and it is also a non-profit organization and with no affiliation with any party. CEEM is organized as an assembly body in which delegations take part. Thanks to students’ work, CEEM is nowadays one of the most powerful qualification's/degree's representations of Spain. As a result of this, the Spanish medical students’ voice has a lawful representative before the Administration and the different institutions. It stands an informative, critical and participative attitude in all the matters and fields that concern the medical students training. It also analyzes students situation and teaching in Medicine, it tries to improve them and it promotes Public Health as well. At this moment it is part of Medical Profession's Forum, that holds the voice of all medical profession together with the Spanish Medical Colleges Organization (Organización Médical Colegial or OMC), the National Dean's Conference, the National Council of Specialities in Health Sciences, the Federation of Medical and Scientific Spanish Associations and the National Confederation of Medical Union. CEEM has the same vote in Medical Profession's Forum as the other organizations previously mentioned. In the area of external relationships, CEEM keeps contact with other bodies of student representation and Spanish scientific associations. Furthermore, it gathers regularly with the Ministry of Health, Social Services and Equiality (Ministerio de Sanidad, Servicios Sociales e Igualdad, MSSSI) and the Ministry of Education, Culture and Sport (Ministerio de Educación, Cultura y Deporte, MECD).

== Origin ==
It appeared with the beginning of democracy, and years after it received its biggest impulse working as a state organism which coordinated the mobilizations of “6=0”, against the lack of vacancies in the public system for doctors without specialty.

== Organization Chart ==
=== General Assembly ===
The supreme governing body of the association is the General Assembly (GA), which is made up of representatives of each of the 40 university medical faculties in Spain (31 of them are at public universities and 9 at private universities). Each representative has an equal vote in the GA, irrespective of the number of students they represent. The agenda for each GA meeting is agreed in advance. Decisions are generally taken by absolute majority of the votes submitted, though in some cases the Association's Statutes may require a two-thirds majority.

=== Executive board ===
This is the visible face of the organization, which entrusts with the expected tasks during the interassembly period, the events’ assistance, the media's statements, etc. It is chosen by democratic and secret vote of the representatives. It is conformed by Presidency, Vice-Presidency of Internal Tasks, Vice-Presidency of External Tasks, General Secretary and Treasury. The post are currently held by:

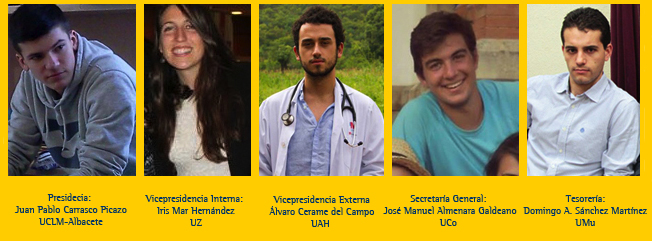

During the assembly, the executive board's role consists in managing the sessions, mediating the assembly and favoring in all moment the active participation of the assistants in the plenary sessions.

=== Working Commissions ===
To favor the work and the correct development of the different subjects related to CEEM, there are four Working Commissions: Medical Education, Bioethics, Medical Residency and Profession and Public Health. All students have the possibility of working and participating in this commissions, and they cal also contribute with their personal view in all of the hot topics.

=== Official´s Team ===
It helps the executive board, and it is also chosen in a democratic and secret way by the GA. It is formed by official charges of the council, but not all of them are included: the ones in charge of the External Relationships Division Area are exempt.

The members of the executive board, Coordinators of Thematic Commissions, Coordinators of Bodies and Internal Management Bodies (except for the Public Relationships Division, which does not have a coordinator, for it is directly coordinated by the External Tasks Vice-president), Zone Coordinators and the Spokespeople form the Official's Team. They are all individual positions and, but for the executive board, for a settled duration.

Thus, the Official's Team consists of 20 people.

=== Internal Management Organs ===
There are other five more Internal Management Organs that safeguard the good running of the council and the correct spreading of their activities: Legislative Coordination, Advisory Commission, Projects Division, Formation's Division and Public Relations’ Division.

=== Zones ===
The different faculties are divided in zones to be better managed:

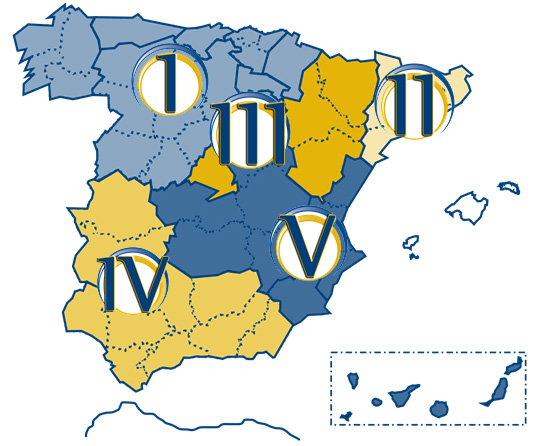
Zones

Zone I: Galicia, Asturias, Cantabria, Basque Country, Castile and Leon and Navarra.

Zone II: Catalonia.

Zona III: Madrid and Aragon.

Zone IV: Extremadura and Andalusia.

Zone V: Castile-La Mancha, Valencia, Murcia and Canary Islands.

=== Committee ===
Currently there are four Committees: the Primary Health Care Committee contacts the family doctor's societies; the Student Organization Committee is in permanent touch with other Student Associations; the Communication Committee, in charge of press relationships and activities diffusion; and the Technological Management Committee, which looks out for the work done in the council's online platforms.

=== CEEM’s Representatives ===
It is a charge of one interassembly period. On the one hand, those students designated by their faculties to represent them in a Medical Students State Conference (Jornadas Estatales de Estudiantes de Medicina, JEEM) are considered representatives. They have the right to take part in the assembly.

On the other hand, those students that haven't assisted to the last JEEM but still work for CEEM, don't lose their rank of representatives.

=== CEEM Associates ===
They are people who, even though they have been to the latest Medical Student State Conference (JEEM), they were not appointed by their Faculty for that purpose. Nonetheless, they collaborate in CEEM in the Working Commissions. It can also address to Medicine students who had never attended a JEEM but wished to help the council.

== Medical Students State Conference ==
The Medical Students State Conference (JEEM) has as an objective to gather all representatives and it must be celebrated each 6 months at the most, around April and October. In this conference the decisions making and the General Assemblie's agreement both take place. A proposals’ agreement, which collects all the students’ requests, is also redacted and sent to the MSSI, Spanish Medical Colleges Organization and the National Dean's Conference. The headquarters are rotating and there is a pre-establish order. However, if there's a faculty which has a special motivation and excitement, it can present its candidacy, which would be voted by the Assembly. An extraordinary plenary session can be called by the executive board or five faculties. The time include between each JEEM makes a “period”. The last JEEM (LXXI) took place in Girona, from 9th to 12 December in 2014, and the next will take place in Valencia (the date still needs to be determined).

== Medical Education Congress (CEM) ==
The Medical Education Congress is the biggest national congress of medical students. It is annual and it takes place in March or April. It is organized each year by a different faculty. The VI Medical Students Congress, which was celebrated from 1st to 3 March in Zaragoza, counted on the participation of more than 600 medical students from all parts of Spain.

== CEEM 0.0: Training Conferences ==
The Training Conferences 0.0 are focused on representation, student associativism and CEEM's work. The first CEEM 0.0 took place in Elche and the last on Albacete, a few months ago. They are born as a necessity of giving training to the youngest representatives. They are annual and their headquarters are also rotating.

== CEEM 2.0: Training Conferences ==
It is a way of forming the most veteran representatives. Their headquarters are fixed in Madrid; they are annual and they took place in summertime.

== Next events ==
“CEEM 2.0: Training Conferences” Madrid, July 2014. “LXXII JEEM” University of Valencia, October or November 2014. “CEEM 0.0: Formative Conferences” University of CEU Cardenal Herrera, February 2015. “LXXIII JEEM” University of Valladolid, April 2015. “VII Medical Education Congress” not defined headquarters, March 2015.

== Open Library ==
The Open Library is born with the purpose of put all students closer to CEEM. It tries to ease the diffusion of medical information. Relevant information to the Medicine degree can be found here, and also it is possible to access to professional organizations’ contents, scientific reviews and associations, and CEEM documents as well. It is structured in themes (residency in a foreign country, the Professional Code of Medical Practices...).

== Awards ==
Hipócrates Award from Murcia's Medical Colleges Organization (COMMurcia).

Best Ideas 2012 award from Diario Médico

Best Medical Ideas 2009 award from Diario Médico.

EDIMSA XXVI edition award, in 2009.

Best Medical Institution of the year ward from Medical Profession's Forum.

Best Medical Ideas 2008 award from Diario Médico.
