= Manuel R. Torres =

Spanish researcher

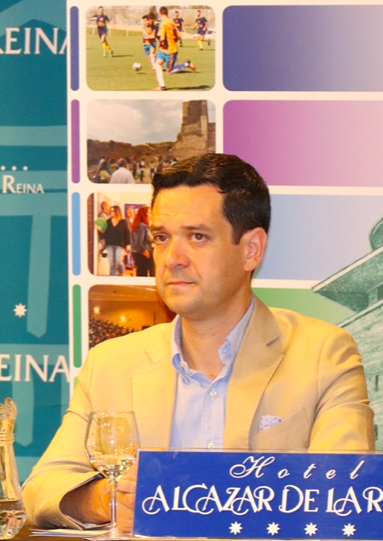
- Manuel R Torres
- Occupation: Writer, Researcher

Manuel R. Torres is a Spanish researcher known for his work on political violence, jihadist terrorism, and cyber security.

== Education ==
Torres has a degree in Political Science and Sociology from the University of Granada. In 2007, he presented his PhD thesis focused on Jihadist terrorism, when there was still high tension after 9/11.

== Works ==
He has participated in numerous national and international research works. He has written several books, and has numerous publications in magazines and chapter collaborations with other books.

In his book Disinformation, the effect of disinformation on different policy areas is analysed.

Torres is a lecturer in the Department of Political Science and Administration at the Universidad Pablo de Olavide in Seville, and also directs several masters and specialisations.

He is a member of the European Counter-Terrorism Centre (Europol) and sits on the academic board of several organisations in the security field.

== Publications ==
- El Eco del Terror. Ideología y propaganda en el terrorismo yihadista. Plaza y Valdés, Madrid, 2009. ISBN 978-8492751051
- Al Andalus 2.0. La ciber-yihad contra España. Biblioteca GESI, Granada, 2014.ISBN 978-8461679911
- Desinformación. Poder y Manipulación en la Era Digital. Comares, Granada, 2019. ISBN 978-8490458853

== Awards ==
- Primer Premio Nacional de Fin de Carrera en Ciencia Política (2002).
- Award "Francisco Moreno" de la Armada Española (2005)
- Award Defensa de Investigación (2008)
- Award Research Real Maestranza de Caballería de Sevilla – Universidad Pablo de Olavide (2010)
- Bronze Medal to police merit with blue badge for the cuerpo de Mossos d'Esquadra-Policia de la Generalitat (2015)
- Distinction by the Institute for Strategic Research of Armada de México (2018)
