= Josep Vendrell =

Spanish army colonel and president of FC Barcelona

Josep Vendrell (died 19 July 1950) was a former Spanish army colonel who served as the 26th president of FC Barcelona from 1943 to 1946. Under his presidency the club won the La Liga in the 1944–45 season and the Copa Eva Duarte in 1945. During his early years he served as a colonel in the Spanish army, fighting on Francisco Franco's side in the Spanish Civil War. According to FC Barcelona's website, Vendrell was appointed by the government for the presidency of the football club; "[a] post which they wanted to see held by people linked to Franco’s regime". Vendrell left the club on 20 September 1946, after three years.
