= Contemporary Culture Index =

Cultural database

Contemporary Culture Index (ccindex) is a multidisciplinary international database which provides access to publications in "architecture, art, cinema, cultural studies, design, literature, music, philosophy, photography and social sciences". It was founded in 2002 by Javier Anguera Phipps, serials librarian at the library of the Fundació Antoni Tàpies in Barcelona, and in 2013 it received a grant from the Graham Foundation.

The database is updated daily and is maintained by a team of librarians based in the United States (Somerville, Massachusetts and Manhattan) and Spain (Barcelona). It is described as "address[ing] two tendencies in current scholarship: a homogenization of research sources due to the “search engine effect” (i.e., to believe that what exists and is known is what is retrieved by a commercial search engine) and a multiplicity of modes of access to online materials."

A reviewer for the Art Libraries Society of North America criticised "the deliberately amateurish look and feel of the website" while agreeing that it "responds well on mobile devices", and said that "The true value to this collection is the access to the lesser-known and out-of-print publications that can be found within this index."

It has ISSN 1944-4621.
