= Miguel González (footballer, born 1927) =

Spanish footballer (1927–2021)

Personal information
- Full name: Miguel González Pérez
- Date of birth: 27 April 1927
- Place of birth: Santa Cruz de La Palma, Spain
- Date of death: 6 July 2021 (aged 94)
- Place of death: Madrid, Spain
- Height: 1.65 m (5 ft 5 in)
- Position: Forward

Senior career*
Years	Team	Apps	(Gls)
1943–1944	Mensajero		
1944–1947	Iberia		
1947–1949	Victoria		
1949–1960	Atlético Madrid	214	(62)
1951–1952	→ Real Oviedo (loan)	21	(9)
1960–1963	Real Zaragoza	73	(17)
1963–1964	Real Murcia	18	(1)
Total		326	(89)

International career
1953–1958	Spain	15	(2)

Managerial career
- 1968–1969: Atlético Madrid
- 1969: Real Betis
- 1970–1971: Hércules
- 1972–1973: Getafe Deportivo
- * Club domestic league appearances and goals

Miguel González Pérez (27 April 1927 – 6 July 2021) was a Spanish football player and manager.

== Career ==
Born in Santa Cruz de La Palma, González played as a striker for Mensajero, Iberia, Victoria, Atlético Madrid, Real Oviedo, Real Zaragoza and Real Murcia. With Atlético Madrid he scored 73 goals in 252 games, winning two league titles and one Cup.

He scored 2 goals in 15 games for the Spain national team between 1953 and 1958.

He later worked as a manager with Atlético Madrid (having previously served as assistant), Real Betis, Hércules and Getafe Deportivo.

He died on 6 July 2021 in Madrid, aged 94. At the time he was Atlético Madrid's oldest former player.
