= Nicolau Casaus =

Spanish businessman and sports leader

- Born: Nicolau Casaus de la Fuente i Jené; 12 February 1913; Mendoza, Argentina
- Died: 8 August 2007 (aged 94); Barcelona, Catalonia, Spain
- Occupations: Businessmen; Sports leader
- Known for: Vice-president of FC Barcelona

President of the supporters' club of FC Barcelona
- In office 1948–1966

Vice-president of FC Barcelona
- In office 1978–2003
- Succeeded by: Albert Vicens

Nicolau Casaus de la Fuente Jené (12 February 1913 – 8 August 2007) was a Catalan businessman and sports leader, who served as vice-president of FC Barcelona for 25 years, from 1978 to 2003. Additionally, he also founded Penya Germanor Barcelonista, the first official supporters' club of FC Barcelona during the post-war period, and was part of the organizing committee for the inauguration of the Camp Nou in 1957.

== Early and political life ==
Casaus was born in the Argentine city of Mendoza on 12 February 1913. When he was only five years old, his family moved to Igualada for economic reasons, and also because his father José was Andalusian, from Lora del Río, Seville, while his mother Gertrudis was from Lleida. From a young age, Casaus became a fervent supporter of FC Barcelona.

Casaus studied at the Piarist school, where he began playing football, but he ended up joining the Igualada military, where, during a friendly match, he had the opportunity to strike up a friendship with the legendary Josep Samitier, who introduced him to Barça's environment and offered him support in difficult times due to his political convictions. After studying Economics and teaching Catalan, he was director and editorialist of the magazine Horitzons, whose editorial line caused many problems.

Casaus combined his links to Barcelona to his work in the family textile business, tasks to which he added Catalanist and anti-fascist activism around the Spanish Civil War, when he directed the republican magazine Horitzons. Due to these activities, at the end of the war, Casaus was tried and imprisoned by a war council after being accused of being a red, separatist and aiding the rebellion, and sentenced to death, a situation that remained for 72 days.

Casaus eventually spent five years in prison, and was released without civil rights, as a former prisoner for political reasons. Due to his political background, he was also vetoed by the central bodies to form part of the Barcelona board, despite being requested by several presidents, but he actively collaborated in many activities related to Barça, including founding Penya Germanor Barcelonista in Igualada, the first official supporters' club of FC Barcelona during the post-war period, which he ended up presiding over for 18 years, and which also included, among others, Antoni Ramallets and Gustau Biosca. Although he was not officially part of the club, Francesc Miró-Sans appointed him responsible for organizing the inauguration ceremonies for the inauguration of the Camp Nou on 24 September 1957. However, as a result of the political reprisals imposed by the dictatorship, he was not able to officially become a manager of Barça until 1978, already in the post-Franco era.

=== FC Barcelona vice-presidency ===
In 1965, Casaus ran for the first time in the club elections, which were won by Narcís de Carreras, who appointed him as the club's official representative among the supporters clubs. In 1978, Casaus was a candidate for the presidency of the Blaugrana club in the elections won by Josep Lluís Núñez with a total of 10,352 votes, compared to Ferran Ariño's 9,527 and Casaus' 6,202. Despite his defeat at the polls, he ended up accepting a proposal from Núñez to join the Board, even though during the electoral campaign, he had said that he could be described as a "pig" if he made an agreement with his rivals. During the Basque builder's term, Casaus was mainly responsible for the social area and relations with the club's supporters clubs.

In 1999, the year of Barça's centenary celebration, more than 300 supporters' clubs paid tribute to him at the Camp Nou, and on 13 June of that year, during a match against Real Betis (4–1), he was moved and jumped onto the pitch accompanied by his family and representatives of more than 300 Barça supporters' clubs to receive the applause of all the Barça fans and representatives of all the Spanish clubs. In 1995, he received the medal for sporting merit and the Forgemasters of the Sports History of Catalonia (1995).

== Death ==
Casaus died in Barcelona on 8 August 2007, at the age of 94. Following his death, the then vice-president of Barça Albert Vicens stated that Casaus was "a charismatic symbol who had a very important bond with the club and who represented the will to spread Barça throughout the world".
