= Alberto Pérez Zabala =

Spanish footballer

Personal information
- Full name: Alberto Pérez Zabala
- Date of birth: 6 April 1925
- Place of birth: Bilbao, Spain
- Date of death: 7 August 2014 (aged 89)
- Position: Goalkeeper

Youth career
- Athletic Bilbao
- Arenas Club

Senior career*
Years	Team	Apps	(Gls)
1948–1951	Atlético Madrid	8	(0)
1951–1953	Sporting de Gijón	6	(0)
- Laudio
Total		14	(0)
- * Club domestic league appearances and goals

Alberto Pérez Zabala (6 April 1925 – 7 August 2014) was a Spanish professional footballer who played as a goalkeeper.

== Career ==
Born in Bilbao, Pérez played for Athletic Bilbao, Arenas Club, Atlético Madrid, Sporting de Gijón and Laudio.

== Later life and death ==
After retiring as a player Pérez worked for the Banco de Vizcaya; he died on 7 August 2014.
