= 1950–51 La Liga =

20th season of La Liga

Primera División
- Season: 1950–51
- Champions: Atlético Madrid (4th title)
- Relegated: Málaga; Murcia; Alcoyano; Lérida
- Latin Cup: Atlético Madrid
- Matches: 240
- Goals: 1,038 (4.33 per match)
- Top goalscorer: Telmo Zarra (38 goals)
- Biggest home win: Atlético Bilbao 10–0 Lérida
- Biggest away win: Lérida 1–6 Real Madrid; Lérida 1–6 Valencia
- Highest scoring: Atlético Bilbao 9–4 Celta
- Longest winning run: 5 matches Barcelona; Valladolid
- Longest unbeaten run: 9 matches Valladolid
- Longest winless run: 10 matches Alcoyano; Lérida
- Longest losing run: 10 matches Alcoyano

The 1950–51 La Liga season was the 20th edition of the Spanish football top division. Defending champions Atlético Madrid achieved their fourth title, securing it with a 1–1 draw on the final matchday away to Sevilla, their direct rivals for the championship who would have taken the trophy with a win, had a 100% home record up to that point, and who won the league five years earlier in almost identical circumstances.

== Format ==
This was the first season after the expansion of the league to 16 teams. The two last qualified teams were directly relegated to Segunda División and teams in the 13th and 14th position joined the relegation play-offs with the second and third qualified teams of each one of the two groups of the Segunda División.

== Team locations ==
Location of teams in 1950–51 La Liga

Lérida made their debut in La Liga.

Club	City	Stadium
Alcoyano	Alcoy	El Collao
Atlético Bilbao	Bilbao	San Mamés
Atlético Madrid	Madrid	Metropolitano
Barcelona	Barcelona	Les Corts
Celta	Vigo	Balaídos
Deportivo La Coruña	A Coruña	Riazor
Español	Barcelona	Sarriá
Lérida	Lérida	Campo de los Deportes
Málaga	Málaga	La Rosaleda
Murcia	Murcia	La Condomina
Real Madrid	Madrid	Chamartín
Real Santander	Santander	El Sardinero
Real Sociedad	San Sebastián	Atotxa
Sevilla	Seville	Nervión
Valencia	Valencia	Mestalla
Valladolid	Valladolid	Municipal

== League table ==
Pos	Team	Pld	W	D	L	GF	GA	GD	Pts	Qualification or relegation
1	Atlético Madrid (C)	30	17	6	7	87	50	+37	40	Qualification for the Latin Cup
2	Sevilla	30	17	4	9	79	46	+33	38	
3	Valencia	30	17	3	10	64	48	+16	37	
4	Barcelona	30	16	3	11	83	61	+22	35	
5	Real Sociedad	30	15	5	10	77	56	+21	35	
6	Valladolid	30	14	5	11	51	51	0	33	
7	Atlético Bilbao	30	15	3	12	88	56	+32	33	
8	Celta	30	15	3	12	62	56	+6	33	
9	Real Madrid	30	13	5	12	80	71	+9	31	
10	Real Santander	30	12	6	12	49	60	−11	30	
11	Español	30	13	4	13	82	72	+10	30	
12	Deportivo La Coruña	30	13	4	13	64	47	+17	30	
13	Málaga (R)	30	12	5	13	55	52	+3	29	Qualification for the relegation group
14	Murcia (R)	30	8	3	19	40	86	−46	19	Qualification for the relegation group
15	Alcoyano (R)	30	6	2	22	36	92	−56	14	Relegation to the Segunda División
16	Lérida (R)	30	6	1	23	41	134	−93	13	Relegation to the Segunda División

Source: BDFútbol
Rules for classification: 1) Points; 2) Head-to-head results; 3) Goal difference; 4) Number of goals scored
(C) Champions; (R) Relegated

== Results ==
Home \ Away	ALC	ATB	ATM	BAR	MAL	CEL	DEP	ESP	LER	MUR	RSA	RMA	RSO	SEV	VAL	VAD
Alcoyano	—	0–1	1–2	0–1	2–1	0–2	0–1	4–1	6–2	1–0	3–3	2–1	1–4	1–1	0–2	1–4
Atlético Bilbao	8–1	—	4–0	4–3	3–1	9–4	1–1	4–2	10–0	5–1	3–1	2–5	7–1	3–0	4–1	1–1
Atlético Madrid	5–1	2–0	—	6–4	3–0	3–2	5–2	1–1	7–1	2–2	9–1	4–0	2–2	2–1	3–1	7–0
Barcelona	6–0	2–1	3–0	—	7–2	3–1	2–2	4–1	6–1	2–1	2–1	7–2	8–2	4–1	2–1	3–1
Málaga	2–0	2–1	2–1	3–1	—	1–2	4–2	2–0	9–0	0–0	2–0	3–0	4–1	2–0	0–2	0–0
Celta	6–2	4–1	0–2	2–2	2–1	—	1–2	2–0	4–0	4–1	1–0	2–2	3–1	3–0	5–1	0–1
Deportivo La Coruña	4–0	4–0	3–0	2–0	2–2	4–1	—	4–1	10–1	4–1	0–1	5–0	1–1	0–3	1–0	0–1
Español	5–3	3–2	4–3	6–0	4–2	3–1	3–2	—	8–0	7–0	2–0	7–1	2–1	2–4	2–2	3–2
Lérida	3–1	0–3	3–4	0–3	2–5	2–3	1–0	5–4	—	3–2	4–2	1–6	1–0	4–5	1–6	2–2
Murcia	3–1	3–6	1–3	3–2	4–0	1–2	2–0	0–0	3–2	—	2–0	2–5	2–1	3–2	2–4	1–2
Real Santander	3–1	1–0	1–0	2–2	0–0	2–1	4–2	4–3	5–1	4–0	—	1–0	1–1	2–2	0–2	4–1
Real Madrid	7–0	2–2	3–6	4–1	1–1	1–1	2–1	6–2	7–0	6–0	0–1	—	7–2	3–3	3–2	2–1
Real Sociedad	3–1	3–0	1–1	3–1	4–1	5–1	5–1	3–1	2–0	7–0	5–0	6–2	—	1–0	3–0	5–2
Sevilla	7–1	1–0	1–1	4–0	4–2	3–0	3–1	5–2	5–0	5–0	4–0	4–0	2–1	—	4–0	4–0
Valencia	4–1	3–1	1–0	4–2	3–1	0–1	0–3	3–2	4–1	2–0	3–3	2–1	1–1	4–0	—	4–1
Valladolid	0–1	4–2	3–3	1–0	1–0	3–1	2–0	1–1	2–0	4–0	4–1	0–1	3–2	4–1	0–1	—

Source: BDFútbol
Legend: Blue = home team win; Yellow = draw; Red = away team win.

== Relegation group ==
Teams qualified in the 13th and 14th position joined the relegation group with the teams qualified in the second and third group of each one of the two groups of the Segunda División. The two top teams would play the next La Liga season.

=== Standings ===
Pos	Team	Pld	W	D	L	GF	GA	GD	Pts	Qualification
1	Las Palmas (O, P)	10	8	0	2	26	11	+15	16	Qualification to La Liga
2	Zaragoza (O, P)	10	7	1	2	31	16	+15	15	Qualification to La Liga
3	Málaga (R)	10	7	1	2	34	18	+16	15	Qualification to Segunda División
4	Murcia (R)	10	3	0	7	23	33	−10	6	Qualification to Segunda División
5	Sabadell	10	2	1	7	14	25	−11	5	Qualification to Segunda División
6	Salamanca	10	1	1	8	8	33	−25	3	Qualification to Segunda División

Source: BDFútbol
Rules for classification: 1) Points; 2) Head-to-head results; 3) Goal difference; 4) Number of goals scored
(O) Play-off winners; (P) Promoted; (R) Relegated

=== Results ===
Home \ Away	LPA	MAL	MUR	SAB	SAL	ZAR
Las Palmas	—	4–1	6–1	2–0	2–1	2–0
Málaga	2–0	—	5–2	4–0	6–0	4–2
Murcia	2–5	1–5	—	5–2	6–2	1–4
Sabadell	1–2	2–2	1–0	—	3–0	2–4
Salamanca	0–2	1–3	0–3	3–2	—	1–1
Zaragoza	3–1	6–2	3–2	3–1	5–0	—

Source: BDFútbol
Legend: Blue = home team win; Yellow = draw; Red = away team win.

== Top scorers ==
Rank	Player	Team	Goals
1	(Spain) Telmo Zarra	Atlético Bilbao	38
2	(Spain) César Rodríguez	Barcelona	29
3	(Spain) Pahiño	Real Madrid	21
4	(Spain) Manuel Badenes	Valencia	20
5	(Spain) Adrián Escudero	Atlético Madrid	19
5	(Spain) Juan Araujo	Sevilla	19
5	(Spain) Gerardo Coque	Valladolid	19
8	(Spain) Francisco Javier Marcet	Español	18
9	(Spain) Epi	Real Sociedad	17
9	(Spain) José Caeiro	Real Sociedad	17

Larbi benbarek
