= Alfonso Silva =

Spanish footballer

Personal information
- Full name: Alfonso Silva Placeres
- Date of birth: 19 March 1926
- Place of birth: Las Palmas de Gran Canaria, Spain
- Date of death: 16 February 2007 (aged 80)
- Place of death: Konstanz, Germany
- Position: Midfielder

Senior career*
Years	Team	Apps	(Gls)
1941–1945	Real Club Victoria		
1946–1957	Atletico de Madrid	153	(34)
1957–1958	Las Palmas	36	(11)

International career
1949–1951	Spain	5	(1)
- * Club domestic league appearances and goals

Alfonso Silva Placeres (19 March 1926 – 16 February 2007) was a football player considered one of the best in the history of Canary Islands' football.

He won La liga with Atletico de Madrid in 1949 and 1950 and was in the Spain national football team which played in the 1950 FIFA World Cup in Brazil.

On 10 January 1950 he played for the Canary Islands football team against the Argentine champion San Lorenzo de Almagro which was successfully touring in Europe. The Canary Islands beat them 4–2.

In 1956 he was cast out because of a disciplinary problem by coach Barrios. He was transferred to newly created team Union Deportiva Las Palmas which paid 300,000 pesetas.

== Honours ==
Atlético Madrid

- La Liga: 1949–50, 1950–51
- Copa Eva Duarte: 1951
