= 1949–50 La Liga =

19th season of La Liga

Primera División
- Season: 1949–50
- Champions: Atlético Madrid (3rd title)
- Relegated: Gimnástic; Oviedo
- Latin Cup: Atlético de Madrid
- Matches: 182
- Goals: 773 (4.25 per match)
- Top goalscorer: Telmo Zarra (24 goals)
- Biggest home win: Barcelona 10–1 Gimnástico; Celta 10–1 Gimnástic; Sevilla 9–0 Gimnástic
- Biggest away win: Gimnástico 1–5 Celta; Gimnástico 0–4 Atlético Madrid; Español 0–4 Valladolid
- Highest scoring: Atlético de Madrid 6–6 Athletic Bilbao
- Longest winning run: 4 matches Atlético de Madrid; Deportivo de La Coruña; Sevilla
- Longest unbeaten run: 11 matches Real Madrid
- Longest winless run: 8 matches Oviedo
- Longest losing run: 7 matches Gimnástico

The 1949–50 La Liga was the 19th season since its establishment. Atlético de Madrid conquered their third title.

== Format ==
Due to the expansion of the league to 16 teams for the next season, the two last qualified teams played the relegation playoffs against the third and fourth qualified teams of the promotion play-offs from Segunda División.

== Team locations ==
Location of teams in 1949–50 La Liga

Málaga made their debut in La Liga.

Club	City	Stadium
Atlético Bilbao	Bilbao	San Mamés
Atlético Madrid	Madrid	Metropolitano
Barcelona	Barcelona	Les Corts
Celta	Vigo	Balaídos
Deportivo La Coruña	A Coruña	Riazor
Gimnástico	Tarragona	Avenida de Cataluña
Español	Barcelona	Sarriá
Málaga	Málaga	La Rosaleda
Oviedo	Oviedo	Buenavista
Real Madrid	Madrid	Chamartín
Real Sociedad	San Sebastián	Atotxa
Sevilla	Seville	Nervión
Valencia	Valencia	Mestalla
Valladolid	Valladolid	Municipal

== League table ==
Pos	Team	Pld	W	D	L	GF	GA	GD	Pts	Qualification or relegation
1	Atlético Madrid (C)	26	15	3	8	71	51	+20	33	Qualification for the Latin Cup
2	Deportivo La Coruña	26	12	8	6	48	38	+10	32	
3	Valencia	26	12	7	7	71	43	+28	31 (Note: Valencia finished ahead of Real Madrid on overall goal difference.)	
4	Real Madrid	26	11	9	6	60	49	+11	31	
5	Barcelona	26	13	3	10	67	47	+20	29 (Note: Barcelona finished ahead of Atlético Bilbao on head-to-head points: Barcelona 5–0 Atlético Bilbao, Atlético Bilbao 3–1 Barcelona.)	
6	Atlético Bilbao	26	12	5	9	72	66	+6	29	
7	Celta	26	13	2	11	63	50	+13	28	
8	Real Sociedad	26	9	9	8	57	43	+14	27	
9	Valladolid	26	8	9	9	49	46	+3	25 (Note: Valladolid finished ahead of Sevilla on head-to-head points: Valladolid 1–1 Sevilla, Sevilla 2–3 Valladolid.)	
10	Sevilla	26	11	3	12	60	61	−1	25	
11	Español	26	8	6	12	42	64	−22	22	
12	Málaga	26	8	5	13	44	51	−7	21	
13	Gimnástico (R)	26	7	2	17	39	99	−60	16	Qualification for the relegation play-offs
14	Oviedo (R)	26	4	7	15	30	65	−35	15	Qualification for the relegation play-offs

Source: BDFútbol
Rules for classification: 1) points; 2) head-to-head points; 3) head-to-head goal difference; 4) goal difference; 5) number of goals scored.
(C) Champions; (R) Relegated

== Results ==
Home \ Away	ATB	ATM	BAR	CEL	DEP	ESP	GIM	MAL	OVI	RMA	RSO	SEV	VAL	VAD
Atlético Bilbao	—	1–0	3–1	4–1	2–2	4–0	7–0	2–1	3–0	6–2	5–2	2–3	3–6	3–2
Atlético Madrid	6–6	—	4–1	4–2	6–1	5–2	5–1	3–2	4–1	5–1	5–3	0–1	4–4	2–1
Barcelona	5–0	1–0	—	2–1	2–0	1–2	10–1	4–0	5–0	2–3	2–0	7–0	2–0	2–2
Celta	1–1	2–0	6–4	—	2–3	4–1	10–1	1–0	3–1	5–2	0–1	4–2	3–2	4–0
Deportivo La Coruña	1–1	3–1	3–0	1–1	—	2–1	1–0	1–0	2–2	3–0	4–4	3–0	5–1	1–0
Español	4–1	0–2	2–2	3–0	3–2	—	3–1	2–2	1–1	1–1	2–2	2–1	6–4	0–4
Gimnástico	5–3	0–4	1–4	1–5	3–2	3–1	—	5–1	3–2	0–3	2–1	2–4	1–1	4–1
Málaga	2–3	3–3	0–0	2–0	2–1	4–1	5–1	—	2–1	1–3	5–2	2–0	1–2	2–1
Oviedo	3–1	1–3	0–2	1–2	0–2	2–3	1–1	2–2	—	2–0	0–0	1–0	2–0	2–2
Real Madrid	2–2	4–2	6–1	1–0	1–1	1–1	5–1	2–1	6–2	—	2–2	4–2	2–2	1–1
Real Sociedad	2–3	4–1	2–4	4–0	0–1	5–0	3–1	1–0	7–0	1–1	—	5–0	1–1	1–1
Sevilla	5–3	0–1	5–2	4–3	2–2	2–1	9–0	3–1	7–0	2–1	3–4	—	2–2	2–3
Valencia	4–1	6–0	4–0	1–2	3–0	4–0	5–1	4–0	2–1	2–2	0–0	5–0	—	4–1
Valladolid	6–2	0–1	2–1	4–1	1–1	4–0	3–0	3–3	2–2	1–4	0–0	1–1	3–2	—

Source: BDFútbol
Legend: Blue = home team win; Yellow = draw; Red = away team win.

== Relegation play-offs ==
Gimnástico played their match at Sarrià Stadium and Oviedo at Estadio Metropolitano de Madrid.

Team 1	Score	Team 2
Gimnástico	3–6	Alcoyano
Oviedo	0–2	Murcia

== Top scorers ==
Rank	Player	Team	Goals
1	(Spain) Telmo Zarra	Atlético Bilbao	24
2	(Spain) Silvestre Igoa	Valencia	22
3	(Spain) Hermidita	Celta	21
4	(Spain) Pahiño	Real Madrid	20
5	(Spain) César Rodríguez	Barcelona	17
6	(Spain) Manuel Torres	Málaga	15
7	(Spain) Rafael Franco	Deportivo La Coruña	14
7	(Spain) Juan Araujo	Sevilla	14
9	(Spain) Vicente Seguí	Valencia	13
9	(Spain) José Caeiro	Real Sociedad	13
