= 1974–75 Real Madrid CF season =

72nd season in existence of Real Madrid CF

Real Madrid CF
1974–75 season
- President: Santiago Bernabéu
- Head coach: Miljan Miljanić
- Stadium: Santiago Bernabéu
- La Liga: 1st (in European Cup)
- Copa del Generalísimo: Winners
- European Cup Winners' Cup: Quarter-finals
- Top goalscorer: League: Santillana (17); All: Santillana (23)
Home colours	Away colours

The 1974–75 season was Real Madrid Club de Fútbol's 72nd season in existence and the club's 43rd consecutive season in the top flight of Spanish football.

== Summary ==
The club clinched its 16th League title with a massive 12 points gap above runners-up Real Zaragoza catching the first spot early since round 6 of the tournament. After collapsing to the 8th place last season, changes came to the team in the summer: replacing interim coach Luis Molowny arrived new head coach former Yugoslavia side manager Miljan Miljanić, 1974 FIFA World Cup winner Paul Breitner replacing Ramón Grosso as a starter in midfield, and Argentine forward Roberto Martínez from Español (resulting in Oscar Más being transferred out the team). Teenage defender José Antonio Camacho and Rubiñán reinforced the defensive line replacing Zoco (retired) and José Luis. Additionally, Vicente del Bosque won the starter spot against ageing Velazquez in midfield. In the offensive line, Miljanic changed the side moving Gunter Netzer from midfield to forward position along with striker Roberto Martínez, and returned from injuries was Santillana benching ageing Amancio. The squad scored 66 league goals, its best output in 10 seasons.

In the 1974–75 European Cup Winners' Cup, the team reached the quarter-finals being eliminated by Crvena Zvezda in a penalty shoot-out 5–6.

Also, during June the squad clinched "The Double" after winning the 1975 Copa del Generalísimo Final over Atlético Madrid on penalties 4–3 after a 0–0 draw.

== Squad ==
Note: Flags indicate national team as defined under FIFA eligibility rules; some limited exceptions apply. Players may hold more than one non-FIFA nationality.

No.	Pos.	Nation	Player
—	GK	ESP	Miguel Ángel
—	GK	ESP	Mariano García Remón
—	GK	ESP	Andrés Junquera
—	DF	ESP	José Antonio Camacho
—	DF	ESP	Goyo Benito
—	DF	ESP	Benito Rubiñán
—	DF	ARG	Juan Carlos Touriño
—	DF	ESP	Jose Macanás
—	DF	ESP	José Luis
—	DF	ESP	Juan Verdugo
—	DF	ESP	Juan Morgado
—	DF	ESP	Heredia

No.	Pos.	Nation	Player
—	MF	FRG	Paul Breitner
—	MF	ESP	Vicente del Bosque
—	MF	ESP	Pirri
—	MF	FRG	Günter Netzer
—	MF	ESP	Velazquez
—	MF	ESP	Ramón Grosso
—	MF	ESP	Alberto Vitoria
—	FW	ESP	Santillana
—	FW	ARG	Roberto Martínez
—	FW	ESP	Ico Aguilar
—	FW	ESP	Amancio Amaro
—	FW	ESP	Uría

=== Transfers ===
In
Pos.	Name	from	Type
MF	Paul Breitner	Bayern München	
FW	Roberto Martínez	Español	–
MF	Alberto Vitoria	Castilla	–
MF	Jose Heredia Jimenez	CD Castellón	–
MF	Francisco Javier Uria	Real Oviedo	–

Out
Pos.	Name	To	Type
DF	Ignacio Zoco		retired
FW	Oscar Más	River Plate	
FW	Rafael Marañón	Español	–
MF	Planelles	Valencia CF	
DF	Fernando Zunzunegui		–

== Competitions ==
=== La Liga ===
==== Position by round ====
Team / Round	1	2	3	4	5	6	7	8	9	10	11	12	13	14	15	16	17	18	19	20	21	22	23	24	25	26	27	28	29	30	31	32	33	34
Real Madrid	7	2	2	2	2	1	1	1	1	1	1	1	1	1	1	1	1	1	1	1	1	1	1	1	1	1	1	1	1	1	1	1	1	1

==== League table ====
Pos	Team	Pld	W	D	L	GF	GA	GD	Pts	Qualification or relegation
1	Real Madrid (C)	34	20	10	4	66	34	+32	50	Qualification for the European Cup first round
2	Zaragoza	34	15	8	11	58	47	+11	38	Qualification for the UEFA Cup first round
3	Barcelona	34	15	7	12	57	36	+21	37	Qualification for the UEFA Cup first round
4	Real Sociedad	34	12	12	10	37	32	+5	36	Qualification for the UEFA Cup first round
5	Hércules	34	11	14	9	37	36	+1	36	

Source: BDFútbol
Rules for classification: 1) Points; 2) Head-to-head results; 3) Goal difference; 4) Number of goals scored
(C) Champions

==== Matches ====
7 September 1974 1	Valencia CF	1–2	Real Madrid	Valencia
	Keita 5'; Sol (yellow card); Rivadeneira (yellow card) 73' (yellow-red card)	Report	67' Martinez; 85' Netzer; (yellow card) Benito	Stadium: Estadio Mestalla; Referee: Antonio Rios

14 September 1974 2	Real Madrid	2–1	Hércules CF	Madrid
	Breitner 10'; Martinez 23'	Report	70' (o.g.) Pirri; (yellow card) Arieta	Stadium: Santiago Bernabeu; Referee: Mariano Iglesias

28 September 1974 3	UD Salamanca	0–0	Real Madrid	Villares de la Reina
		Report		Stadium: El Helmantico; Referee: Felipe Aure

6 October 1974 4	Real Madrid	1–0	Atlético Madrid	Madrid
	Ico Aguilar 85'	Report	(yellow card) Leal	Stadium: Santiago Bernabeu; Referee: Juan Elizondo

19 October 1974 5	UD Las Palmas	1–2	Real Madrid	Las Palmas de Gran Canaria
	Deborah 65'	Report	33' Pirri; 36' Santillana	Stadium: Estadio Insular; Referee: Jose Gonzalez

27 October 1974 6	Real Madrid	5–0	Español	Madrid
	Breitner 9'; Martinez 30'; Martinez 50'; Amancio 36'; Santillana 60'	Report		Stadium: Estadio Santiago Bernabéu; Referee: Fernando Alvarez

3 November 1974 7	Celta Vigo	3–3	Real Madrid	Vigo
	Doblas 4'; Videla 64' (yellow card); Navarro (red card) 72'; Hidalgo 75' (yellow card); Castro (yellow card); Rodri (yellow card); Amado (yellow card)	Report	Pirri 60'; Pirri 65'; Pirri 89'; Benito (yellow card); Martinez (red card) 72'	Stadium: Estadio Balaídos; Referee: Pablo Ibanez

10 November 1974 8	Real Madrid	3–2	Real Betis	Madrid
	Del Bosque 35'; Del Bosque 64'; Rubiñan 72'	Report	74' Sosa; 82' Bioska; (yellow card) Sabate; (yellow card) Kobo; (yellow card) Bizkocho	Stadium: Estadio Santiago Bernabéu; Referee: Fernando Alvarez

24 November 1974 9	Granada CF	3–3	Real Madrid	Granada
	Garcia 23'; Grande 24' (pen.); Grande 81'; Ederra (yellow card)	Report	10' (o.g.) Falito; 38' Rubiñan; Rubiñan 42'; (yellow card) Perez	Stadium: Los Carmenes; Referee: Ricardo Coscolin

1 December 1974 10	Real Madrid	5–1	Elche CF	Madrid
	Netzer 12'; Santillana 36'; Santillana 62'; Martinez 64'; Martinez 88'	Report	68' Sitja; (yellow card) Montero	Stadium: Santiago Bernabeu; Referee: Emilio Muro

8 December 1974 11	Real Murcia	2–2	Real Madrid	Murcia
	Van Dyck 28' (pen.); Palmas 78'; Escobar (yellow card); Pazos (yellow card)	Report	25' Santillana; 56' Santillana	Stadium: La Condomina; Referee: Jose Capelastegui

15 December 1974 12	Real Madrid	1–1	Real Sociedad	Madrid
	Santillana 80'	Report	18' Satrustegui; (yellow card) Murillo	Stadium: Estadio Santiago Bernabéu; Referee: Ricardo Coscolin

22 December 1974 13	Real Madrid	1–0	Real Zaragoza	Madrid
	Velazquez 25'	Report		Stadium: Estadio Santiago Bernabéu; Referee: Jose Paez

29 December 1974 14	Atletico de Bilbao	1–0	Real Madrid	Bilbao
	Ruiz 32'; Vilar (yellow card); Escalza (yellow card)	Report	(yellow card) Margado	Stadium: San Mamés; Referee: Antonio Palanquez

5 January 1975 15	Real Madrid	1–0	CF Barcelona	Madrid
	Roberto Martínez 43'; Benito (yellow card); Camacho (yellow card)	Report	Neeskens (yellow card); Cruijff (yellow card)	Stadium: Chamartín; Referee: Juango Ruiz

12 January 1975 16	CD Málaga	1–3	Real Madrid	Málaga
	Del Bosque 4' (o.g.); Garcia (yellow card); Montreal (yellow card); Dusto (yellow card); Montero (red card) 42'	Report	40' Martinez; 63' Netzer; 76' (o.g.) Orozco	Stadium: Estadio La Rosaleda

19 January 1975 17	Real Madrid	0–0	Sporting Gijón	Madrid
		Report	(yellow card) Redondo; (yellow card) Fanjul	Stadium: Estadio Santiago Bernabéu; Referee: Jose Gonzalez

26 January 1975 18	Real Madrid	3–2	Valencia CF	Madrid
	Ico Aguilar 12'; Martinez 73'; Santillana 75'	Report	41' Diaz; 59' Planelles; (yellow card) Barracina; (yellow card) Claramunt	Stadium: Estadio Santiago Bernabéu; Referee: Angel Martinez

9 February 1975 19	Hércules CF	1–1	Real Madrid	Alicante
	Quique; Camacho 9' (own goal)	Report	Ico Aguilar 47'	Stadium: Estadio José Rico Pérez; Referee: Felipe Aurre

16 February 1975 20	Real Madrid	1–0	UD Salamanca	Madrid
	Pirri 47' (pen.)	Report		Stadium: Estadio Santiago Bernabéu; Referee: Manuel Samper

23 February 1975 21	Atlético Madrid	1–1	Real Madrid	Madrid
	Ayala 46'; Irureta (yellow card); Capon (yellow card)	Report	18' Santillana; (yellow card) Martinez	Stadium: Estadio Vicente Calderón; Referee: Andres Segovia

2 March 1975 22	Real Madrid	4–1	UD Las Palmas	Madrid
	Martinez 2'; Martinez 27'; Netzer 22'; Santillana 89'	Report	52' Marrero; (yellow card) Carnevali	Stadium: Estadio Santiago Bernabéu; Referee: Fernando Alvarez

9 March 1975 23	Español	0–2	Real Madrid	Barcelona
		Report	32' (pen.) Netzer; 44' Netzer	Stadium: Sarria; Referee: Mariano Iglesias

15 March 1975 24	Real Madrid	4–1	Celta Vigo	Madrid
	Velazquez 17'; Santillana 44'; Santillana 50'; Santillana 82'; Breitner (yellow card); Benito (yellow card); Angel (yellow card)	Report	87' Bois; (yellow card) 88' (yellow-red card) Bois; (yellow card) Amado	Stadium: Estadio Santiago Bernabéu; Referee: Luis Huango

23 March 1975 25	Real Betis	1–3	Real Madrid	Seville
	Anzarda 89'; Biosca (yellow card)	Report	13' Santillana; 50' Ico Aguilar; 62' Amancio	Stadium: Estadio Benito Villamarin; Referee: Jaime Fortuny

25 March 1975 26	Real Madrid	1–0	Granada CF	Madrid
	Amancio 28'	Report		Stadium: Estadio Santiago Bernabéu; Referee: Jose Ron

6 April 1975 27	Elche CF	1–0	Real Madrid	Elche
	Voglino 20'; Gonzalez (yellow card); Lompart (yellow card)	Report	(yellow card) Del Bosque	Stadium: Campo Altabix; Referee: Jose Gonzalez

20 April 1975 28	Real Madrid	4–0	Real Murcia	Madrid
	Martinez 13'; Santillana 26'; Netzer 58'; Breitner 70'	Report	(yellow card) Camino	Stadium: Estadio Santiago Bernabéu; Referee: Jose Ron

27 April 1975 29	Real Sociedad	1–1	Real Madrid	San Sebastián
	Idigoras 25'; Uranga (yellow card); Elkoro (yellow card)	Report	89' Pirri; (yellow card) Martinez	Stadium: Atotxa; Referee: Luis Huango

30 April 1975 30	Real Zaragoza	6–1	Real Madrid	Zaragoza
	Castani 7'; Castani 39'; Castani 55'; Diarte 15'; Arrua 51'; Cimarro 76'	Report	37' Santillana	Stadium: La Romareda; Referee: Fernando Tijerina

4 May 1975 31	Real Madrid	2–0	Atletico Bilbao	Madrid
	Martinez 48'; Rubiñan 73'	Report		Stadium: Estadio Santiago Bernabéu; Referee: Pablo Ibanez

11 May 1975 32	CF Barcelona	0–0	Real Madrid	Barcelona
	Cruijff (yellow card); Neeskens (yellow card); Rife (yellow card)	Report	(yellow card) Del Bosque	Stadium: Estadio del CF Barcelona; Referee: Fernando Tijerina

18 May 1975 33	Real Madrid	4–0	CD Málaga	Madrid
	Pirri 2'; Santillana 24' (pen.); Martinez 74'; Martinez 76'	Report		Stadium: Estadio Santiago Bernabéu; Referee: Jaime Fortuny

25 May 1975 34	Sporting Gijón	2–0	Real Madrid	Gijón
	De Diego 19'; Quini 64'	Report		Stadium: El Molinón; Referee: Jaime Fortuny

=== Copa del Generalísimo ===
==== Final ====
5 July 1975 Final	Real Madrid	0–0 (4–3 p)	Atlético Madrid	Madrid
21:00 CET		Report (in Spanish)		Stadium: Vicente Calderón Stadium; Attendance: 60,000; Referee: Pedro María Urrestarazu
	Penalties
	Amancio (penalty scored); Pirri (penalty scored) del Bosque (penalty missed); Rubiñán (penalty scored); Aguilar (penalty scored)		(penalty missed) Irureta; (penalty scored) Gárate; (penalty missed) Salcedo; (penalty scored) Alberto; (penalty scored) Bezerra

=== European Cup Winners' Cup ===
==== Quarter-finals ====
5 March 1975	Real Madrid (Francoist Spain)	2–0	(Socialist Federal Republic of Yugoslavia) Crvena Zvezda	Madrid
	Santillana 34'; Netzer 65'	Report		Stadium: Estadio Santiago Bernabéu; Attendance: 100,000; Referee: (France) Michel Kitabdjian

19 March 1975	Crvena Zvezda (Socialist Federal Republic of Yugoslavia)	2–0 (a.e.t.) (6–5 p)	(Spain) Real Madrid	Belgrade
	Džajić 35'; O. Petrović 55' (pen.)			Stadium: Red Star Stadium; Attendance: 100,000; Referee: (England) Ken Burns
	Penalties
	Keri (penalty scored); Filipović (penalty scored); Baralić (penalty scored); Savić (penalty scored); O. Petrović (penalty scored); Đorđević (penalty missed); V. Petrović (penalty scored)		(penalty scored) del Bosque; (penalty scored) Netzer; (penalty scored) Aguilar; (penalty scored) Breitner; (penalty scored) Rubiñán; (penalty missed) Goyo; (penalty missed) Santillana

== Statistics ==
=== Players statistics ===
No.	Pos	Nat	Player	Total		La Liga		Copa del Generalísimo		Cup Winners' Cup	
No.	Pos	Nat	Player	Apps	Goals	Apps	Goals	Apps	Goals	Apps	Goals
	GK	(Spain) ESP	Miguel Ángel	43	-43	31	-32	6	-7	6	-4
	DF	(Spain) ESP	Camacho	47	1	34	0	7	1	6	0
	DF	(Spain) ESP	Goyo Benito	43	0	31	0	6	0	6	0
	DF	(Spain) ESP	Rubiñán	41	4	30	4	6	0	3+2	0
	DF	(West Germany) FRG	Breitner	35	3	29	3	0	0	6	0
	MF	(Spain) ESP	Del Bosque	36	2	22+3	2	7	0	4	0
	MF	(Spain) ESP	Pirri	30	13	18+2	7	6	3	4	3
	MF	(Spain) ESP	Velazquez	21	2	14+3	2	1	0	2+1	0
	FW	(Spain) ESP	Santillana	43	23	32	17	7	3	4	3
	FW	(Argentina) ARG	Martínez	38	22	25+2	15	6	3	4+1	4
	FW	(West Germany) FRG	Netzer	37	10	31	7	0	0	6	3
	GK	(Spain) ESP	García Remón	4	-3	3	-2	1	-1		
	FW	(Spain) ESP	Amancio	26	4	16+1	3	7	1	1+1	0
	FW	(Spain) ESP	Ico Aguilar	27	5	14+5	4	1+3	0	3+1	1
	MF	(Spain) ESP	Grosso	24	0	11+6	0	2+3	0	1+1	0
	DF	(Argentina) ARG	Touriño	22	0	9+8	0	2+1	0	2	0
	DF	(Spain) ESP	Macanas	16	1	9+2	0	0	0	4+1	1
	DF	(Spain) ESP	José Luis	12	0	8+2	0	0	0	2	0
	MF	(Spain) ESP	Vitoria	15	1	4+2	0	6+1	1	2	0
	DF	(Spain) ESP	Morgado	5	0	1+4	0				
	DF	(Spain) ESP	Heredia	6	0	0+3	0	0+3	0		
	FW	(Spain) ESP	Uría	8	0	1	0	6+1	0		
	DF	(Spain) ESP	Verdugo	0	0	0	0				
	GK	(Spain) ESP	Junquera	0	0	0	0				

- Source: http://www.bdfutbol.com/en/t/t1974-752.html
