= 1976–77 Real Madrid CF season =

74th season in existence of Real Madrid CF

Real Madrid CF
1976–77 season
- President: Santiago Bernabéu
- Head coach: Miljan Miljanić
- Stadium: Santiago Bernabéu
- La Liga: 9th
- Copa del Rey: Third round
- European Cup: Second round
- Top goalscorer: League: Santillana (12); All: Pirri (14)
Home colours	Away colours

The 1976–77 season is Real Madrid Club de Fútbol's 74th season in existence and the club's 45th consecutive season in the top flight of Spanish football.

== Summary ==
During summer the club failed to replace ageing Gunter Netzer with Brazilian midfielder Zico from Flamengo or English Forward Kevin Keegan from Liverpool F.C. both offers rejected by their teams. The club collapsed to the 9th place in the most disastrous League campaign under Bernabeu Presidency era finishing 12 points below Champions Atlético Madrid despite the arrival of international Danish striker Henning Jensen from Borussia Mönchengladbach. However, even with the chaotic club performance, head coach Miljan Miljanić remained in his position and was ratified by President Santiago Bernabéu on 7 June 1977

Shockingly, in European Cup the squad was defeated by Belgian squad Club Brugge after a 0–0 draw in Valencia, the team lost 0–2 in Brugge being the last away trip of Santiago Bernabéu with the squad.

The club was early eliminated in 1976–77 Copa del Rey Third Round by underdogs Hércules CF.

The overall poor performance in La Liga and Copa del Rey meant that Real Madrid would not compete in any European competition for first time in the history.

== Squad ==
Note: Flags indicate national team as defined under FIFA eligibility rules; some limited exceptions apply. Players may hold more than one non-FIFA nationality.

No.	Pos.	Nation	Player
—	GK	ESP	Miguel Ángel
—	GK	ESP	García Remón
—	GK	ESP	Amador
—	DF	ESP	Juan Sol
—	DF	ESP	José Antonio Camacho
—	DF	ESP	Goyo Benito
—	DF	ESP	Uría
—	DF	FRG	Paul Breitner
—	DF	ESP	Benito Rubiñan
—	DF	ESP	José Luis Sánchez Barrios
—	DF	ESP	Jose Macanás

No.	Pos.	Nation	Player
—	DF	ESP	San José
—	DF	ESP	Andrés
—	MF	ESP	Vicente del Bosque
—	MF	ESP	Pirri
—	MF	ESP	Manuel Velazquez
—	MF	ESP	Alberto Vitoria
—	FW	ESP	Santillana
—	FW	ARG	Roberto Martínez
—	FW	DEN	Henning Jensen
—	FW	ARG	Carlos Guerini
—	FW	ESP	Ico Aguilar

=== Transfers ===
In
Pos.	Name	from	Type
FW	Henning Jensen	Borussia Mönchengladbach	
GK	Amador		–
DF	San José	Castilla	
FW	Salamanca	Rayo Vallecano	–
MF	Escribano		–

Out
Pos.	Name	To	Type
FW	Günter Netzer	Grasshopper Club Zürich	
FW	Amancio Amaro		retired
GK	Andres Junquera	Real Zaragoza	
DF	José Luis		retired
MF	Grosso		retired
DF	Touriño	Independiente Medellín	
GK	Pedro Corral	CD Málaga	

== Friendlies ==
26 May 1977	Atlas FC (Mexico)	2-2	(Spain) Real Madrid	Guadalajara
	Chumpitaz 48'; Araya 65'		26' Del Bosque; 67' Guerini	Stadium: Jalisco; Referee: (Mexico) Javier Galindo

29 May 1977	Pumas UNAM (Mexico)	2-3	(Spain) Real Madrid	Mexico City
	Cabinho 39'; Muñante 89'		23' Camacho; 26' Juanito; 33' Roberto Martínez	Stadium: Olimpico Universitario; Referee: (Mexico) Mario Rubio

2 June 1977	CF Monterrey (Mexico)	1-1	(Spain) Real Madrid	Monterrey
	Mirandinha 63'		75' Jensen	Stadium: Universitario; Referee: (Mexico) Domingo de la Mora

== Competitions ==
=== La Liga ===
==== Position by round ====
Round	1	2	3	4	5	6	7	8	9	10	11	12	13	14	15	16	17	18	19	20	21	22	23	24	25	26	27	28	29	30	31	32	33	34
Ground	H	A	H	A	H	A	A	H	A	H	A	H	A	H	A	H	A	A	H	A	H	A	H	H	A	H	A	H	A	H	A	H	A	H
Result	W	L	L	W	D	W	W	W	L	D	L	W	L	W	D	L	W	L	L	D	W	D	L	W	D	D	D	W	D	L	L	W	D	L
Position	6	8	13	7	7	4	3	2	4	4	6	5	6	5	5	5	5	7	7	8	7	7	9	8	7	7	9	5	5	7	10	6	8	9

Source: www.lfp.es
A = Away; H = Home; W = Win; D = Draw; L = Loss; = 1977–78 European Cup; = 1977–78 UEFA Cup; = 1977–78 Segunda Division

==== League table ====
Pos	Team	Pld	W	D	L	GF	GA	GD	Pts
7	Valencia	34	13	10	11	53	47	+6	36
8	Real Sociedad	34	13	8	13	54	41	+13	34
9	Real Madrid	34	12	10	12	57	53	+4	34
10	Sevilla	34	11	12	11	32	39	−7	34
11	Elche	34	11	11	12	45	47	−2	33

Source: BDFútbol
Rules for classification: 1) Points; 2) Head-to-head results; 3) Goal difference; 4) Number of goals scored

==== Matches ====
5 September 1976 1	UD Salamanca	0–1	Real Madrid	Villares de la Reina
		Report	71' Breitner	Stadium: Estadio Helmántico; Referee: Pedro Elordi

12 September 1976 2	Real Madrid	2–3	Athletic Bilbao	Madrid
	Pirri 52' (pen.); Santillana 58'	Report	22' Churruka; 28' Dani; 64' Irureta; (yellow card) Rojo; (yellow card) Escalza	Stadium: Estadio Santiago Bernabéu; Referee: Jose Carrion

19 September 1976 3	FC Barcelona	3–1	Real Madrid	Barcelona
	Marcial 29'; Cruijff 53'; Heredia 86'	Report	Pirri 52'	Stadium: Camp Nou; Referee: Olavarria González

26 September 1976 4	Real Madrid	4–0	Hércules CF	Madrid
	Guerini 44'; Guerini 49'; Santillana 52'; Rubiñan 89'; Uria (yellow card)	Report		Stadium: Estadio Santiago Bernabéu; Referee: Felipe Aurre

3 October 1976 5	Sevilla CF	1–1	Real Madrid	Sevilla
	Rubio 26'; San Jose (yellow card); Jaen (yellow card); Scott (yellow card)	Report	55' Guerini	Stadium: Estadio Sanchez Pizjuan; Referee: Jaime Fortuny

16 October 1976 6	Real Madrid	1–0	Burgos CF	Madrid
	Garrido 80' (pen.)	Report		Stadium: Estadio Santiago Bernabéu; Referee: Pablo Ibanez

24 October 1976 7	Real Zaragoza	2–4	Real Madrid	Zaragoza
	Castani 71'; Jordao 83'; Rodriguez (yellow card)	Report	22' Velazquez; 26' Jensen; 36' Velazquez; 86' (yellow card) Uria; (yellow card) Camacho; (yellow card) Rubiñan; (yellow card) Santillana	Stadium: La Romareda; Referee: Vicente Bachero

30 October 1976 8	Real Madrid	2–0	Valencia CF	Madrid
	Rivadeneira 16' (o.g.); Santillana 61'; Camacho (yellow card)	Report	(yellow card) Rep; (yellow card) Diarte; (yellow card) Rivadeneira	Stadium: Estadio Santiago Bernabéu; Referee: Ernesto Nunez

7 November 1976 9	Celta Vigo	2–0	Real Madrid	Vigo
	Del Cura 35'; Fenoi 87'; (yellow card) Sanroman; (yellow card) Castro	Report		Stadium: Estadio Balaídos; Referee: Jose Carrion

14 November 1976 10	Real Madrid	2–2	Real Sociedad	Madrid
	Jensen 7'; Martinez 81'; San Jose (yellow card)	Report	41' (yellow card) Idigoras; 68' Satrustegui; (yellow card) Olaizola; (yellow card) Murillo	Stadium: Estadio Santiago Bernabéu; Referee: Victoriano Arminio

21 November 1976 11	Español	4–1	Real Madrid	Barcelona
	Aquino 41' (pen.); Osorio 50'; Canito 70'; Jeremias 75' (yellow card)	Report	74' Martinez; (yellow card) Breitner	Stadium: Sarrià; Referee: Jose Ron

28 November 1976 12	Real Madrid	5–2	Elche CF	Madrid
	Martinez 4'; Pirri 13' (pen.); Pirri 51'; Pirri 63'; Santillana 82'; Velazquez (yellow card)	Report	38' Cristo; 62' Fontana; (yellow card) Malenchon; (yellow card) Indio	Stadium: Estadio Santiago Bernabéu; Referee: Mariano Iglesias

5 December 1976 13	Real Betis	2–0	Real Madrid	Sevilla
	Anzarda 63'; Muren 72'; Cobo (yellow card)	Report	(yellow card) Santillana; (yellow card) Goyo Benito	Stadium: Estadio Benito Villamarin; Referee: Jesus Sanz

12 December 1976 14	Real Madrid	3–0	UD Las Palmas	Madrid
	Del Bosque 25'; Santillana 51'; Camacho 76'; Uria (yellow card)	Report	(yellow card) Verde; (yellow card) Marrero	Stadium: Estadio Santiago Bernabéu; Referee: Emilio Muro

19 December 1976 15	Racing Santander	3–3	Real Madrid	Santander
	Zuviria 40'; Zuviria 52' (pen.); Zuviria 72'; Aguirre (yellow card)	Report	44' Martinez; 45' Pirri; 53' Pirri; (yellow card) Uria	Stadium: El Sardinero; Referee: Antonio Rios

2 January 1977 16	Atlético Madrid	4–0	Real Madrid	Madrid
	Cano 2'; Diaz 63'; Cano 66'; Bermejo 81'; Aguilar (yellow card)	Report		Stadium: Estadio Vicente Calderón; Referee: Fernando Alvarez

9 January 1977 17	Real Madrid	4–1	CD Málaga	Madrid
	Pirri 10'; Santillana 51'; Martinez 65'; Martinez 73'	Report	28' (yellow card) Wilkes; (yellow card) Fortes; (yellow card) Popo; (yellow card) Miguel; (yellow card) Vilanova; (yellow card) Romero; (yellow card) Alberdi	Stadium: Estadio Santiago Bernabéu; Referee: Pedro Elordi

16 January 1977 18	Real Madrid	0–1	UD Salamanca	Madrid
	Guerini (yellow card)	Report	62' (yellow card) Alves; (yellow card) Galleguillos	Stadium: Estadio Santiago Bernabéu; Referee: Jose Quiroz

23 January 1977 19	Athletic Bilbao	4–1	Real Madrid	Bilbao
	Dani 16' (pen.); Churruka 30'; Churruka 51'; Dani 89'	Report	13' Santillana; (yellow card) 23' (yellow-red card) Uria; (yellow card) Juan Sol; (yellow card) Goyo Benito	Stadium: San Mamés; Referee: Jose Gonzalez

30 January 1977 20	Real Madrid	1–1	FC Barcelona	Madrid
	Pirri 2' (pen.); Camacho (yellow card); Vicente del Bosque	Report	Cruijff 16'	Stadium: Estadio Santiago Bernabéu; Referee: Jose Carrion

8 February 1977 21	Hércules CF	0–1	Real Madrid	Alicante
	Barrios (yellow card)	Report	65' Santillana	Stadium: Estadio José Rico Perez; Referee: Vicente Bachero

13 February 1977 22	Real Madrid	0–0	Sevilla CF	Madrid
		Report		Stadium: Estadio Santiago Bernabéu; Referee: Jaime Fortuny

20 February 1977 23	Burgos CF	3–2	Real Madrid	Burgos
	Juanito 35'; Juanito 62'; Kresic 67'	Report	56' Jensen; 64' Santillana	Stadium: Estadio El Plantío; Referee: Victoriano Arminio

27 February 1977 24	Real Madrid	4–2	Real Zaragoza	Madrid
	Rico 1' (o.g.); Soria 48'; Camacho 56'; Rubiñan 74' (yellow card); Juan Sol (yellow card)	Report	77' (yellow card) Jordao; 79' Planelles; (yellow card) Duñabetia; (yellow card) Arrua	Stadium: Estadio Santiago Bernabéu; Referee: Angel Martinez

6 March 1977 25	Valencia CF	1–1	Real Madrid	Valencia
	Diarte 40' (pen.) (yellow card)	Report	41' Santillana	Stadium: Estadio Madrid; Referee: Fernando Alvarez

13 March 1977 26	Real Madrid	0–0	Celta Vigo	Madrid
	Del Bosque (yellow card); Soria (yellow card); Goyo Benito (yellow card)	Report	(yellow card) Viela; (yellow card) Igartua	Stadium: Estadio Santiago Bernabéu; Referee: Antonio del Barrio

20 March 1977 27	Real Sociedad	1–1	Real Madrid	San Sebastián
	Santrustegui 61'; Gaztelu (yellow card)	Report	80' Santillana; (yellow card) Camacho; (yellow card) Juan Sol	Stadium: Atotxa; Referee: Jaime Fortuny

3 April 1977 28	Real Madrid	4–1	Español	Madrid
	Martinez 27' Pirri 45' (pen.); Jensen 53'; Martinez 82'	Report	38' Casely (yellow card); (yellow card) Ferrer	Stadium: Estadio Santiago Bernabéu; Referee: Jose Ron

9 April 1977 29	Elche CF	1–1	Real Madrid	Elche
	Fontana 23'; Benitez (yellow card)	Report	70' Martinez; (yellow card) Ico Aguilar	Stadium: Campo de Altabix; Referee: Fernando Alvarez

24 April 1977 30	Real Madrid	0–1	Real Betis	Madrid
	Del Bosque (yellow card)	Report	69' Ladino; (yellow card) Esnaola	Stadium: Estadio Santiago Bernabéu; Referee: Jaime Fortuny

1 May 1977 31	UD Las Palmas	4–2	Real Madrid	Las Palmas
	Perez 8'; Juani 51'; Morete 60' (pen.); Morete 67'	Report	62' Guerini; 71' Pirri	Stadium: Estadio Insular; Referee: Pedro Elordi

8 May 1977 32	Real Madrid	3–1	Racing Santander	Madrid
	Jensen 18'; Jensen 59'; Ico Aguilar 88'; Juan Sol (yellow card)	Report	51' Jimenez; (yellow card) Genupi	Stadium: Estadio Santiago Bernabéu; Referee: Felipe Aurre

15 May 1977 33	Real Madrid	1–1	Atlético Madrid	Madrid
	Martinez 70'; Soria (yellow card); Goyo Benito (yellow card)	Report	41' Cano; (yellow card) Bermejo; (yellow card) Pereira	Stadium: Estadio Santiago Bernabéu; Referee: Jose Abad

22 May 1977 34	CD Málaga	2–1	Real Madrid	Málaga
	Orozco 37'; Carlos 74'	Report	Santillana 80'	Stadium: Estadio La Rosaleda; Referee: Jose Carrion

=== Copa del Rey ===
==== Third round ====
23 February 1977	Hércules CF	3–0	Real Madrid	Alicante
		Report		Stadium: Estadio José Rico Perez

9 March 1977	Real Madrid	2–0	Hércules CF	Madrid
		Report		Stadium: Estadio Santiago Bernabéu

=== European Cup ===
==== First round ====
15 September 1976	Stal Mielec (Poland)	1–2	Real Madrid	Mielec
	Sekulski 74'	Report	Santillana 6'; Del Bosque 52'	Stadium: Stadion Miejski; Attendance: 30,000; Referee: (Sweden) Ulf Eriksson

29 September 1976	Real Madrid	1–0	(Poland) Stal Mielec	Valencia
	Pirri 64'	Report		Stadium: Mestalla; Attendance: 35,000; Referee: (France) Michel Kitabdjian

==== Second round ====
20 October 1976	Real Madrid (Spain)	0–0	(Belgium) Club Brugge	Málaga
		Report		Stadium: La Rosaleda; Attendance: 45,000; Referee: (Republic of Ireland) John Carpenter

3 November 1976	Club Brugge (Belgium)	2–0	(Spain) Real Madrid	Bruges
	Le Fevre 18'; Rubiñán 45' (o.g.)	Report		Stadium: Olympiastadion; Attendance: 32,000; Referee: (England) Ken Burns

== Statistics ==
=== Players statistics ===
No.	Pos	Nat	Player	Total		Primera Division		Copa del Rey		European Cup	
No.	Pos	Nat	Player	Apps	Goals	Apps	Goals	Apps	Goals	Apps	Goals
	GK	(Spain) ESP	Miguel Ángel	39	-58	33	-52	2	-3	4	-3
	DF	(Spain) ESP	Juan Sol	34	0	28	0	2	0	4	0
	DF	(Spain) ESP	Goyo Benito	29	0	24+1	0	1	0	3	0
	DF	(Spain) ESP	Uría	26	1	18+2	1	2	0	3+1	0
	DF	(Spain) ESP	Camacho	38	2	32	2	2	0	4	0
	DF	(West Germany) FRG	Breitner	33	1	30	1	0	0	3	0
	MF	(Spain) ESP	Del Bosque	29	2	25	1	1	0	2+1	1
	MF	(Spain) ESP	Pirri	36	14	31	11	2	2	3	1
	MF	(Spain) ESP	Velazquez	25	2	17+3	2	1	0	4	0
	FW	(Spain) ESP	Santillana	36	13	28+2	12	2	0	4	1
	FW	(Denmark) DEN	Jensen	32	6	28	6	0	0	4	0
	GK	(Spain) ESP	García Remón	1	-1	1	-1	0	0		
	FW	(Argentina) ARG	Martínez	24	10	16+5	10	1	0	0+2	0
	DF	(Spain) ESP	Rubiñan	25	2	13+9	2	1	0	2	0
	MF	(Spain) ESP	Vitoria	22	1	15+5	1	2	0		
	FW	(Argentina) ARG	Guerini	22	4	14+3	4	1	0	4	0
	FW	(Spain) ESP	Ico Aguilar	17	1	15+1	1	1	0		
	DF	(Spain) ESP	Sánchez Barrios	10	0	5+4	0	0+1	0		
	DF	(Spain) ESP	San José	3	0	0+3	0				
	DF	(Spain) ESP	Macanas	3	0	1+1	0	1	0		

- Source: http://www.bdfutbol.com/en/t/t1976-772.html
