= 1977–78 Real Madrid CF season =

75th season in existence of Real Madrid CF

Real Madrid CF
1977–78 season
- President: Santiago Bernabéu; Raimundo Saporta (acting President)
- Head coach: Miljan Miljanić (until 7 September 1977); Luis Molowny
- Stadium: Santiago Bernabéu
- La Liga: 1st (in 1978–79 European Cup)
- Copa del Rey: Round of 16
- Top goalscorer: League: Santillana (24); All: Santillana (28)
Home colours	Away colours

The 1977–78 season was Real Madrid Club de Fútbol's 75th season in existence and the club's 46th consecutive season in the top flight of Spanish football.

== Summary ==
The club did not compete in UEFA competitions for the first time since the 1954–55 season. During the summer, the team was reinforced with the arrivals of: Argentine defender Enrique Wolff, and high-expected Forward Juanito from Burgos CF. Bernabeu traveled to West Germany seeking to replace Paul Breitner by signing Borussia Mönchengladbach's star Herbert Wimmer, but once he saw midfielder Uli Stielike play, he changed his mind and transferred the latter into the club.

President Santiago Bernabéu suffered a bowel obstruction on 29 August 1977 and was transferred to a hospital for emergency treatment being diagnosed with cancer days later. After three seasons, Miljan Miljanić left the club on 8 September 1977 signing an agreement with Santiago Bernabéu at the hospital in a bizarre event. Then, Luis Molowny was appointed by Raimundo Saporta as the new head coach. Also, Saporta was appointed as Acting President on 3 September 1977 due to Bernabeu health issues.

In spite of the turmoil, the club clinched its 18th League title ever closing the season on 7 May 1978 six points above runners-up FC Barcelona. Chairman Santiago Bernabéu died on 2 June 1978 ending Real Madrid's most successful era, with the club clinching 6 European Cups and 16 League titles under his presidency.

== Squad ==
Note: Flags indicate national team as defined under FIFA eligibility rules; some limited exceptions apply. Players may hold more than one non-FIFA nationality.

No.	Pos.	Nation	Player
—	GK	ESP	Miguel Ángel
—	DF	ESP	San José
—	DF	ARG	Enrique Wolff
—	DF	ESP	Goyo Benito
—	DF	ESP	Juan Sol
—	MF	FRG	Uli Stielike
—	MF	ESP	Pirri
—	MF	ESP	Vicente del Bosque
—	FW	ESP	Santillana
—	FW	ESP	Juanito
—	FW	DEN	Henning Jensen

No.	Pos.	Nation	Player
—	GK	ESP	García Remón
—	FW	ARG	Carlos Guerini
—	FW	ARG	Roberto Martínez
—	FW	ESP	Isidro
—	DF	ESP	José Antonio Camacho
—	GK	ESP	Amador
—	MF	ESP	Alberto Vitoria
—	FW	ESP	Ico Aguilar
—	DF	ESP	Uría
—	DF	ESP	Sabido
—	GK	ESP	Agustín
—	FW	ESP	Jose Macanás

=== Transfers ===
In
Pos.	Name	from	Type
DF	Enrique Wolff	UD Las Palmas	
MF	Uli Stielike	Borussia Mönchengladbach	–
FW	Juanito	Burgos CF	
FW	Isidro		–
DF	Andrés	CD Castellón	–
GK	Agustín		–

Out
Pos.	Name	To	Type
MF	Paul Breitner	Eintracht Braunschweig	
MF	Manuel Velázquez	Toronto Blizzard	(Note: Transferred out on 1 January 1978)
DF	Benito Rubiñan	Burgos CF	
MF	José Luis Sanchez Barrios	Sevilla CF	
DF	Andrés González Ponce		
FW	Eliseo Salamanca	Deportivo Alavés	

== Competitions ==
=== La Liga ===
==== Position by round ====
Round	1	2	3	4	5	6	7	8	9	10	11	12	13	14	15	16	17	18	19	20	21	22	23	24	25	26	27	28	29	30	31	32	33	34
Ground	A	H	A	H	H	A	H	A	H	A	H	A	H	A	H	A	H	H	A	H	A	A	H	A	H	A	H	A	H	A	H	A	H	A
Result	L	W	W	W	W	W	W	L	W	W	W	W	W	L	W	W	D	D	D	W	L	L	W	L	W	L	W	L	W	W	W	L	W	W
Position	13	3	1	1	1	1	1	1	1	1	1	1	1	1	1	1	1	1	1	1	1	1	1	1	1	1	1	1	1	1	1	1	1	1

Source: www.lfp.es
A = Away; H = Home; W = Win; D = Draw; L = Loss; = 1978–79 European Cup; = 1978–79 UEFA Cup; = 1978–79 Segunda Division

==== League table ====
Pos	Team	Pld	W	D	L	GF	GA	GD	Pts	Qualification or relegation
1	Real Madrid (C)	34	22	3	9	77	40	+37	47	Qualification for the European Cup first round
2	Barcelona	34	16	9	9	49	29	+20	41	Qualification for the Cup Winners' Cup first round (Note: Barcelona qualified to the Cup Winners' Cup as winners of the Copa del Rey.)
3	Athletic Bilbao	34	16	8	10	62	36	+26	40	Qualification for the UEFA Cup first round
4	Valencia	34	16	7	11	54	33	+21	39	Qualification for the UEFA Cup first round
5	Sporting Gijón	34	15	9	10	53	43	+10	39	Qualification for the UEFA Cup first round

Source: BDFútbol
Rules for classification: 1) Points; 2) Head-to-head results; 3) Goal difference; 4) Number of goals scored
(C) Champions

==== Matches ====
4 September 1977 1	UD Salamanca	2–1	Real Madrid	Villares de la Reina
	Tome 46'; Alves 73' (pen.); Juanito (yellow card); Enrique (yellow card)	Report	14' Del Bosque; (yellow card) Goyo Benito	Stadium: Estadio El Helmantico; Referee: Jose Capelastegui

10 September 1977 2	Real Madrid	3–0	Sevilla CF	Madrid
	Pirri 29' (pen.); Santillana 77'; Santillana 80'; Camacho (yellow card)	Report	(yellow card) San Jose; (yellow card) Rubio	Stadium: Estadio Santiago Bernabéu; Referee: Felipe Aurre

18 September 1977 3	Español	1–4	Real Madrid	Barcelona
	Marañon 60'; Caseli (yellow card); Solsona (yellow card); Verdugo (yellow card); Amado (yellow card); Longhi (yellow card); Aquino (yellow card); Fernandez (yellow card)		29' Camacho; 46' Camacho; 75' Santillana; 89' Santillana	Stadium: Estadio Sarriá; Referee: Manuel Fernandez

25 September 1977 4	Real Madrid	1–0	Athletic Bilbao	Madrid
	Pirri 21'	Report	(yellow card) Vidal; (yellow card) Churruka	Stadium: Estadio Santiago Bernabéu; Referee: Jose Ron

2 October 1977 5	Real Madrid	3–0	Burgos CF	Madrid
	Juanito 54'; Santillana 72'; Guerini 89'	Report	(yellow card) Marcos	Stadium: Estadio Santiago Bernabéu; Referee: Jose Gonzalez

9 October 1977 6	Sporting Gijón	0–2	Real Madrid	Gijón
		Report	52' Juanito; 76' Santillana	Stadium: Estadio El Molinon; Referee: Jose Abad

16 October 1977 7	Real Madrid	5–1	Elche CF	Madrid
	Juanito 12'; Juanito 31' (pen.); Del Bosque 19'; Santillana 47'; Santillana 68' (pen.); Garcia Remon (yellow card)	Report	4' Palomares; (yellow card) Erwood; (yellow card) Indio; Insaurralde	Stadium: Estadio Santiago Bernabéu; Referee: Luis Gonzalez

30 October 1977 8	Rayo Vallecano	3–2	Real Madrid	Madrid
	Francisco 12'; Tanko 66'; Landaburu 82'; Salazar (yellow card); Alvarito (yellow card)	Report	50' Pirri; 58' Pirri; (yellow card) Juan Sol	Stadium: Vallecas; Referee: Jose Perez

6 November 1977 9	Real Madrid	1–0	Valencia CF	Madrid
	Juanito 14' (pen.); Santillana (yellow card)	Report	(yellow card) Cabral; (yellow card) 70' (yellow-red card) Cordero; (yellow card) Manzanedo	Stadium: Estadio Santiago Bernabéu; Referee: Jesus Sanz

13 November 1977 10	Real Sociedad	2–3	Real Madrid	San Sebastián
	Ydigoras 72'; José Ufarte 82' (o.g.); Kortabarriya (yellow card); Olaizola (yellow card)	Report	46' Santillana; 80' Santillana; 73' Juanito	Stadium: Atotxa; Referee: Victoriano Arminio

20 November 1977 11	Real Madrid	4–0	Real Betis	Madrid
	San Jose 51'; Wolff 61'; Stielike 63'; Santillana 89'; Goyo Benito (yellow card)	Report	(yellow card) Megido	Stadium: Estadio Santiago Bernabéu; Referee: Manuel Fernandez

4 December 1977 12	FC Barcelona	2–3	Real Madrid	Barcelona
	Rexach 30'; Rexach 67' (pen.); Migueli (yellow card); Zuviría (yellow card)	Report	Jensen 23'; Santillana 35'; Stielike 54'; Goyo Benito (yellow card); Isidoro San José (yellow card)	Stadium: Camp Nou; Referee: De Burgos Nuñez

11 December 1977 13	Real Madrid	4–2	Atlético Madrid	Madrid
	Jensen 12'; Santillana 41'; Santillana 66'; Del Bosque 89'	Report	29' Aguilar; 87' (yellow card) Cano; (yellow card) 59' (yellow-red card) Capon; (red card) 67' Ayala	Stadium: Estadio Santiago Bernabéu; Referee: Victoriano Arminio

18 December 1977 14	Cádiz CF	1–0	Real Madrid	Cádiz
	Baena 12' (yellow card); Ortega (yellow card)	Report	(yellow card) Stielike	Stadium: Estadio Ramón Carranza

31 December 1977 15	Real Madrid	2–0	Racing Santander	Madrid
	Santillana 72'; Guerini 87'; Uli Stielike (yellow card)	Report	(yellow card) Arteche; (yellow card) Madariaga; (yellow card) 86' (yellow-red card) Genyupi; (yellow card) Lolo	Stadium: Estadio Santiago Bernabéu; Referee: Jose Fernandez

8 January 1978 16	Hércules CF	2–3	Real Madrid	Alicante
	Castronovo 14'; Charles 85' (pen.) (yellow card); Arasil (yellow card)	Report	1' (o.g.) Hervas; 63' Santillana; 81' Stielike; (yellow card) Guerini	Stadium: Estadio José Rico Pérez; Referee: Ernesto Nunez

15 January 1978 17	Real Madrid	1–1	UD Las Palmas	Madrid
	Santillana 58'; Stielike (yellow card); Juan Sol (yellow card)	Report	56' Masiel; (yellow card) Fernandez; (yellow card) Morete; (yellow card) Estevez	Stadium: Estadio Santiago Bernabéu; Referee: Ildefonso Azpitare

22 January 1978 18	Real Madrid	0–0	UD Salamanca	Madrid
	Juanito (yellow card); Stielike (yellow card)	Report	(yellow card) Rezza	Stadium: Santiago Bernabeu; Referee: Emilio Muro

29 January 1978 19	Sevilla CF	1–1	Real Madrid	Sevilla
	Scott 42' (yellow card); Barrios (yellow card); Rubio (yellow card)	Report	13' Juanito; (yellow card) 68' (yellow-red card) Guerini	Stadium: Estadio Sanchez Pizjuan; Referee: Fernando Alvarez

5 February 1978 20	Real Madrid	2–1	Español	Madrid
	Stielike 30'; Pirri 74' (pen.); Juanito (yellow card)		82' Casely; (yellow card) Marañon; (yellow card) Lanchas	Stadium: Estadio Santiago Bernabéu; Referee: Juan Elizondo

12 February 1978 21	Athletic Bilbao	2–0	Real Madrid	Bilbao
	Ruiz 76'; Dani 89'; Hisasola (yellow card)	Report		Stadium: San Mamés; Referee: Victoriano Arminio

19 February 1978 22	Burgos CF	3–2	Real Madrid	Burgos
	Tarres 16'; Gonzalez 36' (o.g.); Viteri 69' (yellow card); Teka (yellow card); Quini (yellow card)	Report	53' Stielike; 84' Juanito; (yellow card) San Jose	Referee: Jose Capelastegui

26 February 1978 23	Real Madrid	3–2	Sporting Gijón	Madrid
	Santillana 35'; Stielike 62'; Pirri 86' (yellow card); Guerini (yellow card); Rubio (yellow card)	Report	4' Ferrero; 14' Quini; (yellow card) Doria; (yellow card) Redondo	Stadium: Estadio Santiago Bernabéu; Referee: Antonio del Barrio

5 March 1978 24	Elche CF	3–1	Real Madrid	Elche
	Anton 3'; Volino 62'; Palomares 88'; Esteban (yellow card)	Report	10' (yellow card) Martinez	Stadium: Campo de Altabix; Referee: Jose Carrion

12 March 1978 25	Real Madrid	5–2	Rayo Vallecano	Madrid
	Pirri 6'; Santillana 18'; Guerini 21'; Stielike 77' (yellow card); Wolff 82' (yellow card)	Report	31' Gonzalez; 68' Gonzalez; (yellow card) Astegiano	Stadium: Estadio Santiago Bernabéu; Referee: Juan Perzon

19 March 1978 26	Valencia CF	2–0	Real Madrid	Valencia
	Valdes 10'; Kempes 54' (pen.); Carrete (yellow card); Rivadeneira (yellow card)	Report	(yellow card) Gonzalez; (red card) 89' Guerini	Stadium: Estadio Mestalla; Referee: Jose Perez

26 March 1978 27	Real Madrid	5–0	Real Sociedad	Madrid
	Santillana 18'; Santillana 83' (yellow card); Zamora 54' (o.g.); Jensen 57'; Jensen 88'; Stielike (yellow card); Aguilar (yellow card); Juan Sol (yellow card)	Report	(yellow card) Alonso	Stadium: Estadio Santiago Bernabéu; Referee: Juan Elizondo

2 April 1978 28	Real Betis	4–2	Real Madrid	Sevilla
	Lopez 13'; Anzarda 53' (yellow card); Gonzalez 56'; Soriano 62'	Report	66' Juanito; 68' Jensen; (yellow card) Sabido; (yellow card) San Jose	Stadium: Estadio Benito Villamarin; Referee: Manuel Hernandez

5 April 1978 29	Real Madrid	4–0	FC Barcelona	Madrid
	Jensen 6'; Jensen 10'; Juanito 69' 80'; Santillana 80'; Goyo (yellow card); San José (yellow card)	Report	Migueli (yellow card); Bio (yellow card)	Stadium: Estadio Santiago Bernabéu; Referee: Garcia Carreon

9 April 1978 30	Atlético Madrid	1–3	Real Madrid	Madrid
	Pina 79'; Pereira (yellow card); Benegas (yellow card)	Report	47' Santillana; 71' Stielike; 87' Aguilar	Stadium: Estadio Vicente Calderón; Referee: Emilio Muro

16 April 1978 31	Real Madrid	2–0	Cádiz CF	Madrid
	Wolff 7'; Santillana 18'	Report		Stadium: Estadio Santiago Bernabéu; Referee: Jose Capelastegui

23 April 1978 32	Racing Santander	1–0	Real Madrid	Santander
	Jimenez 89'; Carlos (yellow card); Arteche (yellow card)	Report		Stadium: El Sardinero; Referee: Antonio Sanchez

30 April 1978 33	Real Madrid	3–0	Hércules CF	Madrid
	Stielike 10'; Stielike 15'; Stielike 56'	Report		Stadium: Estadio Santiago Bernabéu; Referee: Jose Quiroz

6 May 1978 34	UD Las Palmas	1–2	Real Madrid	Las Palmas
	Morete 41'	Report	14' Stielike; 62' (yellow card) Stielike	Stadium: Estadio Insular; Referee: Jose Fernandez

=== Copa del Rey ===
==== First round ====
14 September 1977	CD Valdepeñas	0–7	Real Madrid
			Gonzalez 5'; Gonzalez 32'; Aguilar 10'; Santillana 21'; Wolff 35'; Perez 55'; Del Bosque 79'	Referee: Santiago Cuadrado

28 September 1977	Real Madrid	3–0	CD Valdepeñas	Madrid
	Martinez 31'; Martinez 44'; Gonzalez 89'		(yellow card) De la Riva; (yellow card) Vasquez	Stadium: Estadio Santiago Bernabéu; Referee: Jose Quiroz

==== Second round ====
1 November 1977	Algeciras CF	0–6	Real Madrid	Algeciras
			Pirri 10'; Juanito 37'; Juanito 40'; Gonzalez 44'; Santillana 58'; Martinez 60'	Stadium: Nuevo Mirador; Referee: Antonio Sanchez

16 November 1977	Real Madrid	4–2	Algeciras CF	Madrid
	Jensen 41'; Stielike 55'; Aguilar 56'; Martinez 84'		Meraio 10'; Quindejo 14'	Stadium: Estadio Santiago Bernabéu; Referee: Antonio Sanchez

==== Third round ====
14 December 1977	Racing Santander	0–0	Real Madrid	Santander
			(yellow card) Juan Sol	Stadium: El Sardinero; Referee: Juan Elizondo

22 December 1977	Real Madrid	5–1	Racing Santander	Madrid
	Juanito 23'; Juanito 42' (pen.); Santillana 46'; Santillana 65'; Stielike 48'		(yellow card) Arteche; (yellow card) Rojo	Stadium: Estadio Santiago Bernabéu; Referee: Jose Abad

==== Round of 32 ====
Bye

==== Round of 16 ====
18 January 1978	Real Sociedad	2–0	Real Madrid	San Sebastián
	Ufarte 2'; Ufarte 77' ′		(yellow card) Santillana	Stadium: Atotxa; Referee: Manuel Hernandez

8 February 1978	Real Madrid	2–1	Real Sociedad	Madrid
	Pirri 18' (pen.); Pirri 44'		Satrustegui 75'; Murillo (yellow card); Olaizola (yellow card); Garate (yellow card); Alonso (yellow card)	Stadium: Estadio Santiago Bernabéu; Referee: Jose Ron

== Statistics ==
=== Players statistics ===
No.	Pos	Nat	Player	Total		La Liga		Copa del Rey	
No.	Pos	Nat	Player	Apps	Goals	Apps	Goals	Apps	Goals
	GK	(Spain) ESP	Miguel Ángel	34	-38	25+2	-34	7	-4
	DF	(Spain) ESP	Juan Sol	41	0	31+2	0	8	0
	DF	(Argentina) ARG	Wolff	41	4	34	3	6+1	1
	DF	(Spain) ESP	Goyo Benito	23	0	21+1	0	1	0
	DF	(Spain) ESP	San José	40	1	32	1	7+1	0
	MF	(West Germany) FRG	Stielike	31	15	27	13	4	2
	MF	(Spain) ESP	Pirri	28	10	26	7	2	3
	MF	(Spain) ESP	Del Bosque	22	4	15+3	3	4	1
	FW	(Spain) ESP	Juanito	36	14	32	10	4	4
	FW	(Spain) ESP	Santillana	40	28	33+1	24	6	4
	FW	(Denmark) DEN	Jensen	32	8	26	7	5+1	1
	GK	(Spain) ESP	García Remón	8	-6	8	-6	0	0
	FW	(Argentina) ARG	Guerini	26	3	19+2	3	5	0
	FW	(Argentina) ARG	Martínez	30	5	9+15	1	6	4
	FW	(Spain) ESP	Isidro	26	4	14+4	0	6+2	4
	DF	(Spain) ESP	Camacho	19	2	15	2	4	0
	GK	(Spain) ESP	Amador	2	-2	1	0	1	-2
	MF	(Spain) ESP	Vitoria	16	0	1+9	0	5+1	0
	FW	(Spain) ESP	Ico Aguilar	11	3	2+4	1	3+2	2
	DF	(Spain) ESP	Uría	1	0	0	0	1	0
	DF	(Spain) ESP	Sabido	11	0	2+4	0	2+3	0
	GK	(Spain) ESP	Agustín	0	0	0	0		
	FW	(Spain) ESP	Macanas	4	1	1	0	1+2	1

- Source: http://www.bdfutbol.com/en/t/t1977-782.html
