= 1975–76 Real Madrid CF season =

73rd season in existence of Real Madrid CF

Real Madrid CF
1975–76 season
- President: Santiago Bernabéu
- Head coach: Miljan Miljanić
- Stadium: Santiago Bernabéu
- La Liga: 1st (in European Cup)
- Copa del Generalísimo: Round of 16
- European Cup: Semi-finals
- Top goalscorer: League: Pirri (13); All: Santillana (17)
Home colours	Away colours

The 1975–76 season was Real Madrid Club de Fútbol's 73rd season in existence and the club's 44th consecutive season in the top flight of Spanish football.

== Summary ==
The club clinched its 17th league title, finishing five points above runners-up CF Barcelona. Despite Cruijff, Neeskens and Co. having a better offensive line, Real Madrid managed to counterweight that with a brilliant defensive line that ultimately won them the trophy. During the summer, a back up line reinforcement Juan Sol arrived from Valencia. being crucial for the team during the campaign.

In the European Cup, the squad reached the semi-finals, losing the tie against back-to-back Champions Bayern Munich. The club was eliminated early in the Copa del Generalísimo round of 16 by underdogs CD Tenerife, despite playing the decisive match at the Santiago Bernabéu Stadium.

== Squad ==
Note: Flags indicate national team as defined under FIFA eligibility rules; some limited exceptions apply. Players may hold more than one non-FIFA nationality.

No.	Pos.	Nation	Player
—	GK	ESP	Miguel Ángel
—	DF	ESP	Juan Sol
—	DF	ESP	José Antonio Camacho
—	DF	ESP	Goyo Benito
—	DF	ESP	Uría
—	MF	FRG	Paul Breitner
—	MF	ESP	Vicente del Bosque
—	MF	ESP	Pirri
—	FW	FRG	Günter Netzer
—	FW	ESP	Santillana
—	FW	ARG	Roberto Martínez

No.	Pos.	Nation	Player
—	GK	ESP	García Remón
—	MF	ESP	Velazquez
—	FW	ESP	Amancio
—	FW	ARG	Carlos Guerini
—	MF	ESP	Alberto Vitoria
—	GK	ESP	Andrés Junquera
—	DF	ESP	Benito Rubiñan
—	DF	ESP	Sánchez Barrios
—	DF	ESP	José Luis
—	DF	ESP	Jose Macanás
—	FW	ESP	Ico Aguilar
—	MF	ESP	Ramón Grosso
—	DF	ARG	Touriño
—	DF	ESP	Juan Morgado
—	DF	ESP	Andrés

=== Transfers ===
In
Pos.	Name	from	Type
DF	Juan Sol	Valencia CF	
FW	Carlos Guerini	Málaga	–
MF	Sánchez Barrios	UD Salamanca	
DF	Andrés	CD Castellón	–
GK	Pedro Corral	CD Castellón	–

Out
Pos.	Name	To	Type
DF	Juan Verdugo	Español	(Note: Transferred out on 1 July 1975)
DF	Jose Heredia	Deportivo Malaga	(Note: Transferred out on 1 December 1975)
MF	Ramon Grosso	–	retired (Note: 1 January 1976)
DF	Juan Morgado	Real Murcia	(Note: Transferred out on 1 January 1976)

== Competitions ==
=== La Liga ===
==== Position by round ====
Round	1	2	3	4	5	6	7	8	9	10	11	12	13	14	15	16	17	18	19	20	21	22	23	24	25	26	27	28	29	30	31	32	33	34
Ground	H	A	H	A	H	A	A	H	A	H	A	H	A	H	A	H	A	A	H	A	H	A	H	H	A	H	A	H	A	H	A	H	A	H
Result	W	D	W	W	W	D	W	D	D	W	W	D	D	W	L	W	L	L	W	W	W	D	W	W	W	W	L	W	D	W	L	L	W	W
Position	4	3	2	1	1	1	1	1	1	1	1	1	1	1	1	1	2	3	2	2	1	2	1	1	1	1	1	1	1	1	1	1	1	1

Source: www.lfp.es
A = Away; H = Home; W = Win; D = Draw; L = Loss; = 1976–77 European Cup; = 1976–77 UEFA Cup; = 1976–77 Segunda Division

==== League table ====
Pos	Team	Pld	W	D	L	GF	GA	GD	Pts	Qualification or relegation
1	Real Madrid (C)	34	20	8	6	54	26	+28	48	Qualification for the European Cup first round
2	Barcelona	34	18	7	9	61	41	+20	43	Qualification for the UEFA Cup first round
3	Atlético Madrid	34	18	6	10	60	38	+22	42	Qualification for the Cup Winners' Cup first round (Note: Atlético Madrid qualified to the Cup Winners' Cup as winners of the Copa del Generalísimo.)
4	Español	34	18	4	12	48	45	+3	40	Qualification for the UEFA Cup first round
5	Athletic Bilbao	34	14	11	9	43	38	+5	39	Qualification for the UEFA Cup first round

Source: BDFútbol
Rules for classification: 1) Points; 2) Head-to-head results; 3) Goal difference; 4) Number of goals scored
(C) Champions

==== Matches ====
6 September 1975 1	Real Madrid	2–0	Valencia CF	Madrid
	Breitner 26'; Amancio 31'	Report	(yellow card) Zuviria; (yellow card) Chinchon	Stadium: Estadio Santiago Bernabéu; Referee: Antonio Rios

14 September 1975 2	Real Oviedo	0–0	Real Madrid	Oviedo
	Vicente (yellow card)	Report		Stadium: Carlos Tartiere; Referee: Vicente Bachero

21 September 1975 3	Real Madrid	4–0	Hércules CF	Madrid
	Martinez 14'; Martinez 67'; Breitner 50'; Santillana 83'	Report	(yellow card) Nervas	Stadium: Estadio Santiago Bernabéu; Referee: Jaime Fortuny

28 September 1975 4	Real Betis	0–2	Real Madrid	Seville
	Cuñas (yellow card)	Report	24' Martinez; 70' (o.g.) Sabate; (yellow card) Juan Sol; (yellow card) Pirri	Stadium: Estadio Benito Villamarín; Referee: Capelastegui

5 October 1975 5	Real Madrid	2–1	UD Las Palmas	Madrid
	Martinez 51'; Camacho 67'	Report	71' (pen.) Deborah; (yellow card) Estevez	Stadium: Estadio Santiago Bernabéu; Referee: Luis Huango

18 October 1975 6	Real Sociedad	1–1	Real Madrid	San Sebastián
	Angel 13' (o.g.); Murillo (yellow card)	Report	60' Martinez; (yellow card) Del Bosque	Stadium: Atotxa; Referee: Pablo Ibanez

26 October 1975 7	Real Madrid	3–1	Español	Madrid
	Guerini 28'; Guerini 63'; Del Bosque 47'	Report	81' (pen.) Maria; (yellow card) Ferrer	Stadium: Estadio Santiago Bernabéu; Referee: Angel Martinez

1 November 1975 8	Valencia CF	1–1	Real Madrid	Valencia
	Quino 65'; Claramunt (yellow card)	Report	19' Pirri; (yellow card) Guerini	Stadium: Estadio Mestalla; Referee: Jose Paez

9 November 1975 9	Sevilla CF	1–1	Real Madrid	Sevilla
	Biri Biri 76'	Report	46' (yellow card) Breitner	Stadium: Estadio Sanchez Pizjuan; Referee: Santiago Cuadrado

23 November 1975 10	Real Madrid	3–2	Real Zaragoza	Madrid
	Amancio 2'; Breitner 36'; Martinez 87'	Report	(yellow card) Diart; (yellow card) Castani	Stadium: Estadio Santiago Bernabéu; Referee: Antonio Palanquez

8 December 1975 11	Sporting Gijón	0–2	Real Madrid	Gijón
		Report	19' Pirri; 28' (pen.) Pirri	Stadium: Estadio El Molinón; Referee: Angel Martinez

7 December 1975 12	Real Madrid	2–2	Elche CF	Madrid
	Pirri 24'; Pirri 48'	Report	62' (yellow card) Montero; 73' Gonzalez; (yellow card) Alfonseda; (yellow card) Sitzha; (yellow card) Palomares	Stadium: Estadio Santiago Bernabéu; Referee: Santiago Cuadrado

14 December 1975 13	UD Salamanca	0–0	Real Madrid	Villares de la Reina
	Perez (yellow card); Roby (yellow card)	Report	(yellow card) Juan Sol; (yellow card) Pirri	Stadium: El Helmántico; Referee: Juan Elizondo

21 December 1975 14	Real Madrid	1–0	Atletico de Bilbao	Madrid
	Santillana 66'; Goyo Benito (yellow card); Amancio (yellow card)	Report		Stadium: Estadio Santiago Bernabéu; Referee: Emilio Muro

28 December 1975 15	CF Barcelona	2–1	Real Madrid	Barcelona
	Neeskens 3'; Rexach 89'; De la Cruz (yellow card); Fortes (yellow card)	Report	64' Pirri; (yellow card) Amancio	Stadium: Estadio del CF Barcelona; Referee: Juan Pezon

4 January 1976 16	Real Madrid	4–1	Granada CF	Madrid
	Pirri 12' (pen.); Santillana 21'; Santillana 57'; Netzer 37'; Touriño (yellow card)	Report	63' Fox	Stadium: Estadio Santiago Bernabéu; Referee: Juan Elizondo

11 January 1976 17	Atlético Madrid	1–0	Real Madrid	Madrid
	Leal 43'; Bermejo (yellow card); Eusebio (yellow card)	Report	(yellow card) Camacho; (yellow card) Netzer	Stadium: Estadio Vicente Calderón; Referee: Jose Paez

18 January 1976 18	Racing Santander	1–0	Real Madrid	Santander
	Porto 27'	Report	(yellow card) Del Bosque	Stadium: El Sardinero; Referee: Fernando Alvarez

25 January 1976 19	Real Madrid	2–0	Real Oviedo	Madrid
	Pirri 2'; Santillana 86'	Report		Stadium: Estadio Santiago Bernabéu; Referee: Emilio Muro

1 February 1976 20	Hércules CF	1–2	Real Madrid	Alicante
	Carselen 32' (yellow card)	Report	21' Santillana; 29' Santillana	Stadium: Estadio José Rico Pérez; Referee: Jaime Forttuny

8 February 1976 21	Real Madrid	5–0	Real Betis	Madrid
	Pirri 4' (pen.); Amancio 11'; Pirri 18'; Santillana 48'; Santillana 69'	Report	(yellow card) Gonzalez; (yellow card) Lopez	Stadium: Estadio Santiago Bernabéu; Referee: Jose Gonzalez

15 February 1976 22	UD Las Palmas	2–2	Real Madrid	Las Palmas de Gran Canaria
	Morete 64'; Morete 75'	Report	48' Breitner; 67' Pirri	Stadium: Estadio Insular; Referee: Juan Pezon

22 February 1976 23	Real Madrid	1–0	Real Sociedad	Madrid
	Santillana 55'; Goyo Benito (yellow card)	Report	(yellow card) Olaizola	Stadium: Estadio Santiago Bernabéu; Referee: Manuel Samer

29 February 1976 24	Español	0–1	Real Madrid	Barcelona
	Aquino (yellow card); Eremias (yellow card); Ferrer (yellow card)	Report	86' Martinez; (yellow card) Del Bosque	Stadium: Sarrià; Referee: Pablo Ibanez

7 March 1976 25	Real Madrid	2–0	Valencia CF	Madrid
	Santillana 13' (yellow card); Velazquez 46'	Report	(yellow card) Diaz	Stadium: Estadio Santiago Bernabéu; Referee: Antonio del Barrio

13 March 1976 26	Real Madrid	2–0	Sevilla CF	Madrid
	Pirri 42'; Velazquez 85' (yellow card); Amancio (yellow card)	Report	(yellow card) Jaen; (yellow card) Laurent; (yellow card) Blanco	Stadium: Estadio Santiago Bernabéu; Referee: Jose Gonzalez

21 March 1976 27	Real Zaragoza	3–1	Real Madrid	Zaragoza
	Gonzalez 19'; Rubial 25'; Rubial 55'; Arrua (yellow card)	Report	42' Pirri; (yellow card) Rubiñan	Stadium: La Romareda; Referee: Juan Pezon

27 March 1976 28	Real Madrid	2–0	Sporting Gijón	Madrid
	Del Bosque 16'; Amancio 48' (pen.); Juan Sol (yellow card)	Report	(yellow card) Pignel	Stadium: Estadio Santiago Bernabéu; Referee: Ricardo Coscolin

4 April 1976 29	Elche CF	1–1	Real Madrid	Elche
	Palomares 59' (yellow card); Dominici (yellow card)	Report	36' Netzer; (yellow card) Camacho	Stadium: Campo Altabix; Referee: Felipe Aurre

10 April 1976 30	Real Madrid	1–0	UD Salamanca	Madrid
	Santillana 10'	Report		Stadium: Estadio Santiago Bernabéu; Referee: Angel Martinez

18 April 1976 31	Atletico Bilbao	2–0	Real Madrid	Bilbao
	Irureta 30'; Ruiz 76'; Rojo (yellow card)	Report		Stadium: San Mamés; Referee: Santiago Cuadrado

30 April 1976 32	Real Madrid	0–2	CF Barcelona	Madrid
	Goyo Benito (yellow card) 54' (yellow-red card)	Report	15' Rexach; 64' Heredia	Stadium: Estadio Santiago Bernabéu; Referee: Jose Segreles

9 May 1976 33	Granada CF	1–2	Real Madrid	Granada
	Partis 89'; Megido (yellow card); Fernandez (yellow card)	Report	40' Perez; 62' Breitner	Stadium: Los Carmenes; Referee: Pedro Elordi

16 May 1976 34	Real Madrid	1–0	Atlético Madrid	Madrid
	Barrios 80'; Perez (yellow card)	Report	(yellow card) Benegas	Stadium: Estadio Santiago Bernabéu; Referee: Antonio Palanquez

=== Copa del Generalísimo ===
==== Fourth round ====
11 February 1976	Racing Ferrol	1–2	Real Madrid
		Report

17 February 1976	Real Madrid	4–1	Racing Ferrol
		Report

==== Round of 16 ====
9 March 1976	CD Tenerife	2–0	Real Madrid	Santa Cruz de Tenerife
		Report		Stadium: Estadio Heliodoro Rodriguez

4 May 1976	Real Madrid	1–0	CD Tenerife	Madrid
		Report		Stadium: Estadio Santiago Bernabéu

=== European Cup ===
==== First round ====
17 September 1975	Real Madrid (Spain)	4–1	(Romania) Dinamo București	Madrid
	Santillana 8', 90'; Martínez 63'; Netzer 74'	Report	Lucescu 75'	Stadium: Estadio Santiago Bernabéu; Attendance: 20,341; Referee: (Socialist Federal Republic of Yugoslavia) Milivoje Gugulović

1 October 1975	Dinamo București (Romania)	1–0	(Spain) Real Madrid	Bucharest
	Sătmăreanu 33'	Report		Stadium: Stadionul 23 August; Attendance: 50,000; Referee: (Italy) Giulio Ciacci

==== Round of 16 ====
22 October 1975	Derby County (England)	4–1	(Spain) Real Madrid	Derby
	George 9', 15' (pen.), 78' (pen.); Nish 42'	Report	Pirri 25'	Stadium: Baseball Ground, Attendance: 34,839; Referee: (Soviet Union) Anatoliy Ivanov

5 November 1975	Real Madrid (Spain)	5–1 (a.e.t.)	(England) Derby County	Madrid
	Martínez 3', 51'; Santillana 55', 99'; Pirri 83' (pen.)	Report	George 62'	Stadium: Estadio Santiago Bernabéu; Attendance: 95,149; Referee: (Switzerland) Walter Hungerbühler

==== Quarter-finals ====
3 March 1976	Borussia Mönchengladbach (West Germany)	2–2	(Spain) Real Madrid	Düsseldorf
	Jensen 2'; Wittkamp 27'	Report	Martínez 45'; Pirri 61'	Stadium: Rheinstadion; Attendance: 67,069; Referee: (Belgium) Francis Rion

17 March 1976	Real Madrid (Spain)	1–1 (3a-3 agg.)	(West Germany) Borussia Mönchengladbach	Madrid
	Santillana 51'	Report	Heynckes 25'	Stadium: Estadio Santiago Bernabéu, Attendance: 85,956; Referee: (Netherlands) Leonardus van der Kroft

==== Semi-finals ====
31 March 1976	Real Madrid (Spain)	1–1	(West Germany) Bayern München	Madrid
	Martínez 7'	Report	Müller 42'	Stadium: Estadio Santiago Bernabéu; Attendance: 111,000; Referee: (Austria) Erich Linemayr
Note: UEFA sanctioned Real Madrid with a two-match ban to play at the Santiago Bernabéu Stadium due to referee Linemayr having been punched by a fan.

14 April 1976	Bayern München (West Germany)	2–0	(Spain) Real Madrid	München
	Müller 9', 31'	Report	Amancio (yellow card) 91' (yellow-red card)	Stadium: Olympiastadion, Attendance: 78,000; Referee: (Wales) Clive Thomas

== Statistics ==
=== Players statistics ===
No.	Pos	Nat	Player	Total		Primera Division		Copa del Generalisimo		European Cup	
No.	Pos	Nat	Player	Apps	Goals	Apps	Goals	Apps	Goals	Apps	Goals
	GK	(Spain) ESP	Miguel Ángel	43	-39	32	-23	3	-3	8	-13
	DF	(Spain) ESP	Juan Sol	38	0	28	0	2	0	8	0
	DF	(Spain) ESP	Camacho	43	1	33	1	2	0	8	0
	DF	(Spain) ESP	Goyo Benito	37	0	29	0	1	0	7	0
	DF	(West Germany) FRG	Breitner	32	6	25	6	0	0	7	0
	MF	(Spain) ESP	Del Bosque	41	2	28+2	2	3	0	7+1	0
	MF	(Spain) ESP	Pirri	40	16	31	13	1+1	0	7	3
	MF	(Spain) ESP	Velazquez	30	3	16+6	2	4	1	4	0
	FW	(Spain) ESP	Santillana	39	17	30	12	1+1	0	7	5
	FW	(Argentina) ARG	Martínez	33	13	24	7	2	1	7	5
	FW	(West Germany) FRG	Netzer	37	3	28+1	2	0	0	8	1
	GK	(Spain) ESP	García Remón	4	-4	2+1	-3	1	-1	0	0
	DF	(Spain) ESP	Uría	21	1	12+6	0	3	1	0	0
	FW	(Spain) ESP	Amancio	28	4	19	4	2	0	7	0
	FW	(Argentina) ARG	Guerini	20	3	14+2	2	2	1	1+1	0
	MF	(Spain) ESP	Vitoria	19	0	7+5	0	4	0	0+3	0
	GK	(Spain) ESP	Junquera	0	0	0	0	0	0	0	0
	DF	(Spain) ESP	Rubiñan	18	0	6+5	0	3+1	0	2+1	0
	DF	(Spain) ESP	Sánchez Barrios	12	2	1+8	1	3	1	0	0
	DF	(Spain) ESP	José Luis	11	0	4+2	0	3+1	0	0+1	0
	DF	(Spain) ESP	Macanas	6	1	3+1	1	1+1	0		
	FW	(Spain) ESP	Ico Aguilar	4	1	2+1	0	1	1		
	MF	(Spain) ESP	Grosso	2	0	0+1	0	0+1	0		
	DF	(Argentina) ARG	Touriño	3	0	0+1	0	2	0		
	DF	(Spain) ESP	Andrés	1	0	0+1	0				

- Source: http://www.bdfutbol.com/en/t/t1975-762.html
