= 1978–79 Real Madrid CF season =

76th season in existence of Real Madrid CF

Real Madrid CF
- President: Luis de Carlos
- Head coach: Luis Molowny
- Stadium: Santiago Bernabéu
- La Liga: 1st (in European Cup)
- Copa del Rey: Runners-up
- European Cup: Round of 16
- Top goalscorer: League: Santillana (18); All: Santillana (26)
Home colours	Away colours

The 1978–79 season is Real Madrid Club de Fútbol's 77th season in existence and the club's 48th consecutive season in the top flight of Spanish football.

== Summary ==
Nineteen days after the death of Santiago Bernabéu, Luis De Carlos was appointed as new President of the club on 21 June 1978. The new chairman released a new board of directors on 1 September 1978 in an attempt to normalize the club after the turmoil of last year. Owing to financial issues including a growing debt, De Carlos did not reinforced the squad with high-profile players, instead of that, there had a few low-cost arrivals such as: Rafael García Cortés and Francisco García Hernández along Maté and Hipólito Rincón in a sign of austerity for upcoming years, in an era known as "The Madrid of Los Garcia" until 1982.

In the European Cup the team, shockingly, was eliminated early in the second round by underdogs Swiss side Grasshopper Club Zürich on the away goals rule. Meanwhile, in the Copa del Rey the squad advanced to the final where it was defeated by Valencia CF 2–0 at Vicente Calderón Stadium.

The club clinched its 19th League title also second in a row, four points above runners-up Sporting Gijón. Had they also won the Copa del Rey, Real Madrid would've clinched the double, something they would achieve next season.

== Squad ==
Note: Flags indicate national team as defined under FIFA eligibility rules; some limited exceptions apply. Players may hold more than one non-FIFA nationality.

No.	Pos.	Nation	Player
—	GK	ESP	García Remón
—	DF	ESP	San José
—	DF	ARG	Enrique Wolff
—	DF	ESP	Goyo Benito
—	DF	ESP	Juan Sol
—	MF	FRG	Uli Stielike
—	MF	ESP	Pirri
—	MF	ESP	Vicente del Bosque
—	FW	DEN	Henning Jensen
—	FW	ESP	Santillana
—	FW	ESP	Juanito

No.	Pos.	Nation	Player
—	GK	ESP	Miguel Ángel
—	FW	ARG	Carlos Guerini
—	FW	ARG	Roberto Martínez
—	FW	ESP	Isidro
—	DF	ESP	José Antonio Camacho
—	DF	ESP	Rafael García Cortés
—	MF	ESP	Alberto Vitoria
—	FW	ESP	Ico Aguilar
—	DF	ESP	Andrés Sabido
—	GK	ESP	Maté
—	MF	ESP	Francisco García Hernández

=== Transfers ===
In
Pos.	Name	From	Type
DF	Maté		
MF	García Hernández		–
DF	García Cortés		
FW	Hipólito Rincón	Recreativo Huelva	–

Out
Pos.	Name	To	Type
GK	Amador	Hércules CF	
DF	José Macanás	Hércules CF	
GK	Agustín	Castilla	
DF	Uría	Sporting Gijón	
MF	Escribano	Castilla	

== Competitions ==
=== La Liga ===
==== Position by round ====
Round	1	2	3	4	5	6	7	8	9	10	11	12	13	14	15	16	17	18	19	20	21	22	23	24	25	26	27	28	29	30	31	32	33	34
Ground	H	A	A	H	A	H	A	H	A	H	A	H	A	H	A	H	A	A	H	H	A	H	A	H	A	H	A	H	A	H	A	H	A	H
Result	W	D	W	W	D	W	D	W	D	W	D	D	L	W	D	D	D	W	W	D	L	D	D	W	W	W	W	D	D	W	D	W	L	W
Position	4	5	4	1	2	1	1	1	1	1	1	1	1	1	1	1	1	1	1	1	2	2	2	2	2	2	1	1	1	1	1	1	1	1

Source: www.lfp.es
A = Away; H = Home; W = Win; D = Draw; L = Loss; = Leader, 1979-80 European Cup; = 1979-80 UEFA Cup

==== League table ====
Pos	Team	Pld	W	D	L	GF	GA	GD	Pts	Qualification or relegation
1	Real Madrid (C)	34	16	15	3	61	36	+25	47	Qualification for the European Cup first round
2	Sporting Gijón	34	17	9	8	50	35	+15	43	Qualification for the UEFA Cup first round
3	Atlético Madrid	34	14	13	7	55	37	+18	41	Qualification for the UEFA Cup first round
4	Real Sociedad	34	18	5	11	53	36	+17	41	Qualification for the UEFA Cup first round
5	Barcelona	34	16	6	12	69	37	+32	38	Qualification for the Cup Winners' Cup first round (Note: Valencia qualified to the Cup Winners' Cup as winners of the Copa del Rey and Barcelona as title holders of the competition.)

Source: BDFútbol
Rules for classification: 1) Points; 2) Head-to-head results; 3) Goal difference; 4) Number of goals scored
(C) Champions

==== Matches ====
3 September 1978 1	Real Madrid	2–1	Valencia CF	Madrid
	Pirri 29' (pen.); Stielike 34' (yellow card)	Report	44' Arias; (yellow card) Diarte	Stadium: Estadio Santiago Bernabéu; Referee: Ernesto Nunez

10 September 1978 2	UD Salamanca	1–1	Real Madrid	Villares de la Reina
	Baez 89'; Pedraza (yellow card)	Report	18' Wolff	Stadium: Estadio El Helmántico; Referee: Felipe Aurre

17 September 1978 3	Hércules CF	1–2	Real Madrid	Alicante
	Abad 14'; Arasil (yellow card); Hervas (yellow card); Saccardi (yellow card)		76' Ico Aguilar; 82' Stielike	Stadium: Estadio José Rico Pérez; Referee: Juan Pezo

23 September 1978 4	Real Madrid	3–1	FC Barcelona	Madrid
	Santillana 29'; Jensen 32'; Santillana 46' (yellow card); Stielike (yellow card)	Report	Neeskens 15'; Olmo (yellow card); Krankl (yellow card)	Stadium: Estadio Santiago Bernabéu; Referee: Fandos Hernandez

2 October 1978 5	UD Las Palmas	2–2	Real Madrid	Las Palmas
	Masiel 28'; Marrero 75 ' Felipe (yellow card); Robaina (yellow card)	Report	San Jose 48 ' Santillana 88 ' Del Bosque (yellow card); Gonzalez (yellow card)	Stadium: Estadio Insular; Referee: Juan Elizondo

9 October 1978 6	Real Madrid	2–1	Athletic Bilbao	Madrid
	Santillana 46 ' Ico Aguilar 87' (pen.)	Report	Argote 71 ' Rojo (yellow card)	Stadium: Estadio Santiago Bernabéu; Referee: Angel Martinez

22 October 1978 7	Burgos CF	2–2	Real Madrid	Burgos
	Valdes 42' (pen.); Lopez 77 ' Chazaretta (yellow card); Gorospe (yellow card)	Report	Juanito 23 ' Ico Aguilar 66 '	Referee: Jose Carrion

30 October 1978 8	Real Madrid	4–0	Recreativo Huelva	Madrid
	Santillana 24 ' Santillana 55 ' Pirri 27'; Pirri 73'	Report	Benito (yellow card)	Stadium: Estadio Santiago Bernabéu; Referee: Benito Uriz

5 November 1978 9	Celta Vigo	2–2	Real Madrid	Vigo
	Ademir 26 ' Castro 64 ' Mori (yellow card); Manolo (yellow card); Canosa (yellow card)	Report	Guerini 42 ' Martinez 79 ' (yellow card); Pirri (yellow card)	Stadium: Estadio Balaídos; Referee: Ildefonso Azpitare

19 November 1978 10	Real Madrid	3–2	Sporting Gijón	Madrid
	Jensen 11 ' Santillana 48 ' Guerini 61 ' Benito (yellow card)	Report	Ciriaco 52 ' Abel 86 '	Stadium: Estadio Santiago Bernabéu; Referee: Manuel Marguenda

26 November 1978 11	Atlético Madrid	2–2	Real Madrid	Madrid
	Livigna 24 ' Cano (yellow card) 86' (yellow-red card); Pereira 89 ' Marcelino (yellow card); Eusebio (yellow card)	Report	Juanito 4 ' (yellow card); Santillana (yellow card)	Stadium: Estadio Vicente Calderón; Referee: Jose Carrion

3 December 1978 12	Real Madrid	0–0	Español	Madrid
		Report	Molinos (yellow card); Lanshas (yellow card)	Stadium: Estadio Santiago Bernabéu; Referee: Jose Fernandez

17 December 1978 13	Real Zaragoza	1–0	Real Madrid	Zaragoza
	San Jose 37 ' (o.g.); Camus (yellow card)	Report	(yellow card) Guerini	Stadium: La Romareda; Referee: Ernesto Nunez

30 December 1978 14	Real Madrid	2–1	Real Sociedad	Madrid
	Santillana 36'; Santillana 62 ' San Jose (yellow card); Wolff (yellow card)	Report	Satrustegui 12 ' Garate (yellow card) 50' (yellow-red card); Arconada (yellow card)	Stadium: Estadio Santiago Bernabéu; Referee: Luis Gonzalez

7 January 1979 15	Rayo Vallecano	1–1	Real Madrid	Madrid
	Landaburu 57 ' Clares (yellow card) Tanko (yellow card) Alvarito (yellow card)	Report	Santillana 76 ' Benito (yellow card) Jensen (yellow card)	Stadium: Campo Vallecas; Referee: Jose Perez

14 January 1979 16	Real Madrid	1–1	Sevilla CF	Madrid
	Santillana 39 '	Report	64 ' Rubio	Stadium: Estadio Santiago Bernabéu; Referee: Victoriano Arminio

21 January 1979 17	Racing Santander	1–1	Real Madrid	Santander
	Jimenez 53 ' Matsiko (yellow card) 82' (yellow-red card); Genyupi (yellow card)	Report	29 ' Santillana; (yellow card) Stielike	Stadium: Estadio El Sardinero; Referee: Manuel Hernandez

28 January 1979 18	Valencia CF	0–1	Real Madrid	Valencia
	Felman (yellow card)	Report	Hernandez 58 ' Del Bosque (yellow card)	Stadium: Estadio Mestalla; Referee: Angel Martinez

3 February 1979 19	Real Madrid	3–1	UD Salamanca	Madrid
	Santillana 10 ' Santillana 69 ' Juanito 85 '	Report	Corominas 79 '	Stadium: Estadio Santiago Bernabéu; Referee: Jose Gonzalez

11 February 1979 20	Real Madrid	0–0	Hércules CF	Madrid
		Report	(yellow card) Zaccardi	Stadium: Estadio Santiago Bernabéu; Referee: Jose Perez

12 February 1979 21	FC Barcelona	2–0	Real Madrid	Barcelona
	Krankl 52'; Asensi 61'	Report		Stadium: Camp Nou; Referee: Garcia Carrion

25 February 1979 22	Real Madrid	1–1	UD Las Palmas	Madrid
	Santillana 8'	Report	35' Morete	Stadium: Estadio Santiago Bernabéu; Referee: Antonio Palanquez

11 March 1979 23	Athletic Bilbao	3–3	Real Madrid	Bilbao
	Villar 22 ' Dani 23 ' Pirri 73 ' (o.g.)	Report	Hernandez 38' (yellow card); Ico Aguilar 56'; Ico Aguilar 89 '	Stadium: San Mamés; Referee: Jesus Sanz

18 March 1979 24	Real Madrid	4–1	Burgos CF	Madrid
	Hernandez 20 ' Ico Aguilar 23 ' Pirri 50 ' (pen.); Sabido 89 '	Report	Chazaretta 75 ' Lopez (yellow card)	Stadium: Estadio Santiago Bernabéu; Referee: Jose Perez

25 March 1979 25	Recreativo Huelva	1–2	Real Madrid	Huelva
	Vilazan 77 '	Report	Aguilar 64 ' Benito 89 ' Gonzalez (yellow card)	Referee: Manuel Hernandez

7 April 1979 26	Real Madrid	2–0	Celta Vigo	Madrid
	Juanito 42' (yellow card); Aguilar 62 ' Stielike (yellow card)	Report	Castro (yellow card); Villar (yellow card); Vidal (yellow card); Lago (yellow card); Fenoi (yellow card)	Stadium: Estadio Santiago Bernabéu; Referee: Manuel Marquenda

15 April 1979 27	Sporting Gijón	0–1	Real Madrid	Gijón
		Report	Santillana 65 ' Pirri (yellow card); Stielike (yellow card)	Stadium: Estadio El Molinon; Referee: Jose Perez

22 April 1979 28	Real Madrid	1–1	Real Betis	Madrid
	Santillana 28 ' Stielike (yellow card); Juanito (yellow card); San Jose (yellow card); Del Bosque (yellow card); Benito (yellow card)	Report	Bermejo (yellow card) 57' (yellow-red card); Cano 61' (yellow card); Arteche (yellow card); Guzman (yellow card); Pereira (yellow card); Levigna (yellow card); Robi (yellow card)	Stadium: Estadio Santiago Bernabéu; Referee: Antonio Sanchez

4 December 1979 29	Español	1–1	Real Madrid	Barcelona
	Canito 11' (yellow card); Ayufich (yellow card)		Aguilar 43 ' Hernandez (yellow card); Wolff (yellow card)	Stadium: Estadio Sarriá; Referee: Ernesto Nunez

6 May 1979 30	Real Madrid	2–1	Real Zaragoza	Madrid
	Martinez 50 ' Juanito 77' (yellow card); Pirri (yellow card)	Report	Lasa 63' (pen.); Muñoz (yellow card)	Stadium: Estadio Santiago Bernabéu; Referee: Jose Fernandez

13 May 1979 31	Real Sociedad	0–0	Real Madrid	San Sebastián
		Report	(yellow card) Martinez	Stadium: Estadio Anoeta; Referee: Manuel Hernandez

20 May 1979 32	Real Madrid	4–1	Racing Santander	Madrid
	Del Bosque 22'; Del Bosque 54 ' Ukeda 42' (o.g.); Juanito 85'	Report	Alvarito 45 '	Stadium: Estadio Santiago Bernabéu; Referee: Antonio del Barrio

27 May 1979 33	Sevilla CF	2–1	Real Madrid	Sevilla
	Bertoni 12 ' Yu 58 ' Blanco (yellow card); Sanjose (yellow card) 60' (yellow-red card)	Report	Pirri 6' (pen.); Gonzalez (yellow card)	Stadium: Estadio Sanchez Pizjuan; Referee: Benito Uris

3 June 1979 34	Real Madrid	5–1	Racing Santander	Madrid
	Hernandez 15 ' Carlos 48' (o.g.); Jensen 63 ' Martinez 68 ' Martinez 78 '	Report	2' Seten	Stadium: Estadio Santiago Bernabéu; Referee: Luis Gonzalez

=== Copa del Rey ===
==== Final ====
30 June 1979	Valencia CF	2–0	Real Madrid	Madrid
21:00 CEST	Kempes 24'; Kempes 90'; Saura (yellow card); Cervero (yellow card)	Report (in Spanish)	(penalty missed) 28' Wolff; (yellow card) San Jose	Stadium: Vicente Calderón, Attendance: 70,000; Referee: Emilio Guruceta

=== European Cup ===
==== First round ====
13 September 1978	Real Madrid (Spain)	5–0	(Luxembourg) Progrès Niedercorn	Madrid
	Jensen 12'; Juanito 30', 66'; Del Bosque 40'; Wolff 84'	Report		Stadium: Santiago Bernabéu Stadium; Attendance: 70,000; Referee: (Portugal) Mário Luís

27 September 1978	Progrès Niedercorn (Luxembourg)	0–7	(Spain) Real Madrid	Differdange
		Report	Pirri 10'; Jensen 19'; Stielike 28'; Santillana 46', 87'; García Hernández 65'; Margue 90' (o.g.)	Stadium: Stade du Thillenberg; Attendance: 6,000; Referee: (Belgium) Jan Peeters

==== Second round ====
18 October 1978	Real Madrid (Spain)	3–1	(Switzerland) Grasshopper	Madrid
	Juanito 5'; García Hernández 65'; Santillana 77'	Report	Sulser 59'	Stadium: Santiago Bernabéu Stadium; Attendance: 35,000; Referee: (France) Michel Vautrot

1 November 1978	Grasshopper (Switzerland)	2–0	(Spain) Real Madrid	Zürich
	Sulser 8'; Sulser 86'	Report		Stadium: Hardturm; Attendance: 28,000; Referee: (East Germany) Adolf Prokop

== Statistics ==
=== Players statistics ===
No.	Pos	Nat	Player	Total		Primera Division		Copa del Rey		European Cup	
No.	Pos	Nat	Player	Apps	Goals	Apps	Goals	Apps	Goals	Apps	Goals
	GK	(Spain) ESP	García Remón	30	-26	17+2	-17	10	-9	1	0
	DF	(Spain) ESP	Juan Sol	28	1	21	1	3	0	4	0
	DF	(Argentina) ARG	Wolff	49	2	34	1	11	0	4	1
	DF	(Spain) ESP	Goyo Benito	43	1	29+1	1	10	0	3	0
	DF	(Spain) ESP	San José	39	1	28	1	7	0	4	0
	MF	(West Germany) FRG	Stielike	33	3	24	2	7	0	2	1
	MF	(Spain) ESP	Pirri	37	8	25	5	8	2	4	1
	MF	(Spain) ESP	Del Bosque	43	3	28+2	2	9	0	4	1
	FW	(Spain) ESP	Juanito	40	10	28+1	6	7	0	4	4
	FW	(Spain) ESP	Santillana	48	26	33	18	11	6	4	2
	FW	(Denmark) DEN	Jensen	38	5	27	3	8	0	3	2
	GK	(Spain) ESP	Miguel Ángel	20	-22	16	-18	1	-1	3	-3
	FW	(Spain) ESP	Ico Aguilar	35	13	16+10	9	7	4	1+1	0
	FW	(Spain) ESP	Isidro	29	1	14+4	0	7+2	1	2	0
	FW	(Argentina) ARG	Martínez	32	5	3+20	4	3+5	1	0+1	0
	FW	(Argentina) ARG	Guerini	17	2	11+2	2	3	0	1	0
	GK	(Spain) ESP	Maté	2	-2	1	-1	0+1	-1		
	MF	(Spain) ESP	García Hernández	21	8	9+2	4	4+4	2	0+2	2
	DF	(Spain) ESP	Sabido	18	1	6+5	1	5+2	0		
	MF	(Spain) ESP	Vitoria	16	0	2+7	0	0+5	0	0+2	0
	DF	(Spain) ESP	García Cortés	2	0	2	0				
	DF	(Spain) ESP	Camacho	0	0	0	0				
	FW	(Spain) ESP	Rincon	1	0	0	0	0	0	0+1	0

- Source: https://www.bdfutbol.com/en/t/t1978-792.html

== See also ==
The Madrid of los Garcia (in Spanish)
