= 1975 Copa del Generalísimo final =

Copa del Generalísimo 1975 final
- Event: 1974–75 Copa del Generalísimo
Real Madrid	Atlético Madrid
0	0
- Date: 5 July 1975
- Venue: Vicente Calderón, Madrid
- Referee: Pedro María Urrestarazu
- Attendance: 60,000

The Copa del Generalísimo 1975 final was the 73rd final of the King's Cup. It was played at the Vicente Calderón Stadium in Madrid on 5 July 1975, Real Madrid defeating Atlético Madrid in a penalty shoot-out after a 0–0 draw.

== Match details ==
5 July 1975
21:00 CET

Real Madrid	0–0	Atlético Madrid
	Report
Penalties
Amancio (penalty scored); Pirri (penalty scored) del Bosque (penalty missed); Rubiñán (penalty scored); Aguilar (penalty scored)	4–3	(penalty missed) Irureta; (penalty scored) Gárate; (penalty missed) Salcedo; (penalty scored) Alberto; (penalty scored) Bezerra

Vicente Calderón Stadium, Madrid
Attendance: 60,000
Referee: Pedro María Urrestarazu

Real Madrid	Atlético Madrid

GK	1	(Spain) Miguel Ángel
DF	2	(Spain) Juan Carlos Touriño	(substituted off) 99'
DF	4	(Spain) Pirri
DF	3	(Spain) José Antonio Camacho
DF	5	(Spain) Francisco Uría
MF	11	(Spain) Alberto Vitoria
MF	6	(Spain) Vicente del Bosque
MF	8	(Spain) Benito Rubiñán
FW	7	(Spain) Amancio (c)
FW	9	(Spain) Santillana
FW	10	(Spain) Roberto Martínez	(substituted off) 105'
Substitutes:
DF	12	(Spain) José Heredia	(substituted on) 99'
FW	15	(Spain) Francisco Aguilar	(substituted on) 105'
Manager:
(Socialist Federal Republic of Yugoslavia) Miljan Miljanić

GK	1	(Spain) Miguel Reina
DF	2	(Spain) Marcelino
DF	5	(Spain) Eusebio
DF	4	(Argentina) Panadero Díaz	(yellow card) 75'
DF	3	(Paraguay) Domingo Benegas
MF	6	(Spain) Adelardo (c)		(substituted off) 83'
MF	7	(Spain) Alberto
MF	8	(Spain) Javier Irureta
MF	11	(Spain) Eugenio Leal		(substituted off) 106'
FW	9	(Spain) José Eulogio Gárate	(yellow card) 98'
FW	10	(Spain) Heraldo Bezerra
Substitutes:
DF	12	(Spain) Francisco Melo		(substituted on) 106'
MF	14	(Spain) Ignacio Salcedo		(substituted on) 83'
Manager:
(Spain) Luis Aragonés

MATCH RULES

- 90 minutes.
- 30 minutes of extra-time if necessary.
- Penalty shoot-out if scores still level.
- Four named substitutes.
- Maximum of two substitutions.

== See also ==
- Madrid derby
