= 1973–74 Real Madrid CF season =

71st season in existence of Real Madrid CF

Real Madrid CF
1973–74 season
- President: Santiago Bernabéu
- Head coach: Miguel Muñoz (until 14 January 1974); Luis Molowny
- Stadium: Santiago Bernabeu
- Primera Division: 8th
- Copa del Generalísimo: Winners (In European Cup Winners' Cup)
- UEFA Cup: First round
- Top goalscorer: League: Oscar Más (11); All: Oscar Más (11); Pirri (11)
| Home colours | Away colours |

The 1973–74 season was Real Madrid Club de Fútbol's 71st season in existence and the club's 42nd consecutive season in the top flight of Spanish football.

== Summary ==
During the summer, the Spanish Football Federation lifted the ban on the transfers of foreign players after eleven seasons. As such, Madrid signed Argentine forward Oscar Más, German midfielder Günter Netzer, as well as bringing in Spanish teenage defender José Antonio Camacho and youngster Vicente del Bosque. On 8 September 1973, the club announced plans to build a new stadium in Fuencarral, a project that was ultimately rejected by City Government. Madrid finished in just eighth place in the league table, sixteen points behind champions CF Barcelona and their new arrival, Dutch playmaker Johan Cruijff, known internationally as Johan Cruyff. Cruyff was instrumental in the 5–0 defeat of Los Blancos at the Bernabéu in the league Clásico. During the campaign, Miguel Muñoz (head coach since 1960) was fired on 14 January 1974 after a bad streak of results, being replaced by Luis Molowny.

Meanwhile, in June the team won the 1974 Copa del Generalísimo Final 4–0 against champions Barcelona.

Shockingly, in the UEFA Cup the squad bowed out early at the hands of Ipswich Town after losing the first leg of the series 0–1 and a achieving only a miserable draw 1–1 in Madrid.

== Squad ==
Note: Flags indicate national team as defined under FIFA eligibility rules; some limited exceptions apply. Players may hold more than one non-FIFA nationality.

| No. | Pos. | Nation | Player |
|---|---|---|---|
| — | GK | ESP | Andrés Junquera |
| — | GK | ESP | Mariano García Remón |
| — | GK | ESP | Miguel Ángel |
| — | DF | ESP | Goyo Benito |
| — | DF | ESP | José Luis |
| — | DF | ARG | Juan Carlos Touriño |
| — | DF | ESP | Ignacio Zoco |
| — | DF | ESP | Juan Verdugo |
| — | DF | ESP | José Macanás Pérez |
| — | DF | ESP | Benito Rubiñán |
| — | DF | ESP | José Antonio Camacho |
| — | MF | ESP | Pirri |

| No. | Pos. | Nation | Player |
|---|---|---|---|
| — | MF | ESP | Velazquez |
| — | MF | FRG | Günter Netzer |
| — | MF | ESP | Ramón Grosso |
| — | MF | ESP | Vicente del Bosque |
| — | MF | ESP | Juan Morgado |
| — | MF | ESP | Planelles |
| — | FW | ARG | Oscar Más |
| — | FW | ESP | Amancio Amaro |
| — | FW | ESP | Santillana |
| — | FW | ESP | Rafael Marañón |
| — | FW | ESP | Ico Aguilar |

=== Transfers ===
In
| Pos. | Name | from | Type |
|---|---|---|---|
| DF | José Antonio Camacho | – | |
| DF | Vicente del Bosque | CD Castellón | – |
| FW | Oscar Más | River Plate | – |
| MF | Günter Netzer | Borussia Moenchengladbach | – |
| DF | Benito Rubiñán | Deportivo La Coruña | – |
| MF | Morgado | | – |
| MF | Planelles | CD Castellón | – |

Out
| Pos. | Name | To | Type |
|---|---|---|---|
| MF | Grande | Racing Santander | |
| MF | Antonio González | Castellón | |
| FW | Eduardo Anzarda | Real Betis | – |
| MF | Fermín | CD Castellón | |
| FW | Sebastián Fleitas | Sevilla CF | – |
| GK | Pedro Corral | CD Castellón | – |

== Competitions ==
=== La Liga ===
==== Position by round ====
| Round | 1 | 2 | 3 | 4 | 5 | 6 | 7 | 8 | 9 | 10 | 11 | 12 | 13 | 14 | 15 | 16 | 17 | 18 | 19 | 20 | 21 | 22 | 23 | 24 | 25 | 26 | 27 | 28 | 29 | 30 | 31 | 32 | 33 | 34 |
|---|---|---|---|---|---|---|---|---|---|---|---|---|---|---|---|---|---|---|---|---|---|---|---|---|---|---|---|---|---|---|---|---|---|---|
| Ground | H | A | H | A | H | A | A | H | A | H | A | H | A | H | A | H | A | A | H | A | H | A | H | H | A | H | A | H | A | H | A | H | A | H |
| Result | D | D | D | L | W | D | D | D | W | L | W | L | W | L | W | D | D | L | L | W | W | L | L | L | W | W | W | L | W | L | W | L | W | L |
| Position | 11 | 12 | 10 | 16 | 6 | 9 | 8 | 7 | 4 | 6 | 3 | 8 | 7 | 8 | 5 | 5 | 5 | 7 | 7 | 7 | 7 | 9 | 9 | 9 | 9 | 9 | 8 | 9 | 7 | 10 | 8 | 9 | 8 | 8 |

Source: www.lfp.es
A = Away; H = Home; W = Win; D = Draw; L = Loss; = 1974-75 European Cup; = 1974-75 UEFA Cup; = 1974-75 Segunda Division

==== League table ====
| Pos | Team | Pld | W | D | L | GF | GA | GD | Pts | Qualification or relegation |
|---|---|---|---|---|---|---|---|---|---|---|
| 6 | Granada | 34 | 12 | 12 | 10 | 34 | 35 | −1 | 36 | |
| 7 | Málaga | 34 | 12 | 12 | 10 | 31 | 32 | −1 | 36 | |
| 8 | Real Madrid | 34 | 13 | 8 | 13 | 48 | 38 | +10 | 34 | Qualification for the Cup Winners' Cup first round (Note: Real Madrid qualified to the Cup Winners' Cup as champions of the Copa del Generalísimo.) |
| 9 | Español | 34 | 13 | 8 | 13 | 34 | 38 | −4 | 34 | |
| 10 | Valencia | 34 | 13 | 7 | 14 | 41 | 33 | +8 | 33 | |

Source: BDFútbol
Rules for classification: 1) Points; 2) Head-to-head results; 3) Goal difference; 4) Number of goals scored

==== Matches ====
| 1 September 1973 1 | Real Madrid | 0–0 | CD Castellón | Madrid |
| | Peinado (yellow card) | Report | | Stadium: Estadio Santiago Bernabéu; Referee: Pablo Ibanez |

| 9 September 1973 2 | Granada CF | 1–1 | Real Madrid | Granada |
| | Echecopar 16' (pen.); Jaen (yellow card) | Report | 10' Santillana | Stadium: Los Carmenes; Referee: Jaime Fortuny |

| 15 September 1973 3 | Real Madrid | 1–1 | Real Murcia | Madrid |
| | Mas 63'; Netzer (yellow card); Rubiñan (yellow card) | Report | 88' Palmes; (yellow card) Pasos; (yellow card) Cristo | Stadium: Estadio Santiago Bernabéu; Referee: Jose Ron |

| 23 September 1973 4 | Atletico Bilbao | 2–1 | Real Madrid | Bilbao |
| | Hisasola 16'; Uriarte 30'; Rojo (yellow card); Villar (yellow card); Lasa (yellow card) | Report | 51' (pen.) Pirri | Stadium: San Mamés; Referee: Jose Capelastegui |

| 29 September 1973 5 | Real Madrid | 4–0 | Real Zaragoza | Madrid |
| | Aguilar 21'; Planeles 25'; Pirri 77'; Mas 85' | Report | (yellow card) Castani | Stadium: Estadio Santiago Bernabéu; Referee: Emilio Arcumbau |

| 7 October 1973 6 | CF Barcelona | 0–0 | Real Madrid | Barcelona |
| | Gallego (yellow card); Pina (yellow card) | Report | | Stadium: Estadio del CF Barcelona; Referee: Antonio Rios |

| 12 October 1973 7 | Real Madrid | 0–0 | CD Málaga | Madrid |
| | Mas (yellow card) | Report | (yellow card) Bustillo; (yellow card) Montreal; (yellow card) Vilanova | Stadium: Estadio Santiago Bernabéu; Referee: Jose Ron |

| 28 October 1973 8 | Real Oviedo | 1–1 | Real Madrid | Oviedo |
| | Galan 60' | Report | 10' Mas; (yellow card) Touriño | Stadium: Carlos Tartiere; Referee: Andres Segovia |

| 3 November 1973 9 | Real Madrid | 2–0 | Atlético Madrid | Madrid |
| | Pirri 50'; Amancio 73' (pen.) | Report | (yellow card) Eusebio; (yellow card) Capon | Stadium: Estadio Santiago Bernabéu; Referee: Antonio Rios |

| 11 November 1973 10 | Valencia CF | 1–0 | Real Madrid | Valencia |
| | Quino 75'; Claramount (yellow card) | Report | | Stadium: Estadio Mestalla; Referee: Pedro Elordi |

| 18 November 1973 11 | Real Madrid | 5–0 | UD Las Palmas | Madrid |
| | Velazquez 20'; Santillana 37'; Aguilar 49'; Mas 59'; Mas 75' | Report | | Stadium: Estadio Santiago Bernabéu; Referee: Jose Ron |

| 2 December 1973 12 | Elche CF | 1–0 | Real Madrid | Elche |
| | Heredia 51'; Cano (yellow card) | Report | | Stadium: Campo de Altabix; Referee: Fernando Tijerina |

| 9 December 1973 13 | Real Madrid | 3–2 | Racing Santander | Madrid |
| | Amancio 26'; Amancio 41'; Santillana 43'; Velazquez (yellow card) | Report | 74' Aguirre; 85' Porto | Stadium: Estadio Santiago Bernabéu; Referee: Emilio Muro |

| 16 December 1973 14 | Celta Vigo | 2–1 | Real Madrid | Vigo |
| | Jimenez 43'; Castro 71' | Report | 81' Velazquez | Stadium: Estadio Balaídos; Referee: Vicente Bachero |

| 23 December 1973 15 | Real Madrid | 2–1 | Español | Madrid |
| | Amancio 2'; Pirri 31'; Benito (yellow card) | Report | 11' Guri; (yellow card) Maria | Stadium: Estadio Santiago Bernabéu; Referee: Antonio Rios |

| 30 December 1973 16 | Real Sociedad | 2–2 | Real Madrid | San Sebastián |
| | Ansola 6'; Cortabarria (red card) 38'; Urresti 46' | Report | 19' Mas; (red card) 38' Velazquez; 60' Pirri | Stadium: Atotxa; Referee: Luis Huango |

| 6 January 1974 17 | Real Madrid | 2–2 | Sporting Gijón | Madrid |
| | Pirri 10'; Amancio 61'; Peinado (red card) 65' | Report | 20' Megido; 33' Megido; (yellow card) Pascal; (yellow card) Romero; (yellow card) Manuel; (yellow card) 65' (yellow-red card) Doria | Stadium: Estadio Santiago Bernabéu; Referee: Alfredo Perales |

| 13 January 1974 18 | CD Castellón | 2–0 | Real Madrid | Castellón de la Plana |
| | Klars 11'; Cosaniles 47'; Tonin (yellow card); Echarri (red card) 84' | Report | | Stadium: Castalia; Referee: Emilio Muro |

| 20 January 1974 19 | Real Madrid | 0–1 | Granada CF | Madrid |
| | | Report | 14' Garcia; (yellow card) Montero | Stadium: Estadio Santiago Bernabéu; Referee: Mariano Iglesias |

| 27 January 1974 20 | Real Murcia | 0–1 | Real Madrid | Murcia |
| | Casco (red card); Ponce (yellow card); Perez (yellow card) | Report | Perez 48'; Amancio (yellow card); Touriño (red card) 65' | Stadium: Estadio La Condomina; Referee: Pedro Ilordi |

| 3 February 1974 21 | Real Madrid | 1–0 | Atletico Bilbao | Madrid |
| | Perez 74' | Report | | Stadium: Estadio Santiago Bernabéu; Referee: Luis Diaz |

| 17 February 1974 22 | Real Madrid | 0–5 | CF Barcelona | Madrid |
| | | Report | Asensi 30'; Cruijff 39'; Asensi 54'; Juan Carlos 65'; Sotil 69'; Marcial 69' | Stadium: Estadio Santiago Bernabéu; Referee: Jose Orrantia Capelastegui |

| 28 February 1974 23 | Real Zaragoza | 2–1 | Real Madrid | Zaragoza |
| | Arrua 13' (pen.); Arrua 48' (yellow card); Ocampos (red card) 33' | Report | (red card) 33' Pirri; 85' Perez; (red card) 86' Morgado | Stadium: La Romareda; Referee: Andres Segovia |

| 3 March 1974 24 | CD Málaga | 1–0 | Real Madrid | Málaga |
| | Gurini 73' (yellow card); Vilanova (yellow card) | Report | | Stadium: La Rosaleda; Referee: Fernando Tijerina |

| 10 March 1974 25 | Real Madrid | 2–0 | Real Oviedo | Madrid |
| | Peinado 54'; Velazquez 66' | Report | (yellow card) Jacquet | Stadium: Estadio Santiago Bernabéu; Referee: Fernando Tijerina |

| 17 March 1974 26 | Atlético Madrid | 0–2 | Real Madrid | Madrid |
| | | Report | Marañón 78'; Reina 84' (pen.) | Stadium: Estadio Vicente Calderón; Referee: Jose Ron |

| 24 March 1974 27 | Real Madrid | 2–1 | Valencia CF | Madrid |
| | Marañon 1'; Mas 30' | Report | 73' Yara | Stadium: Estadio Santiago Bernabéu; Referee: Fernando Alvarez |

| 31 March 1974 28 | UD Las Palmas | 1–0 | Real Madrid | Las Palmas de Gran Canaria |
| | Deborah 28' | Report | | Stadium: Estadio Insular; Referee: Alfredo Perales |

| 7 April 1974 29 | Real Madrid | 1–0 | Elche CF | Madrid |
| | Pirri 43'; Benito (yellow card) | Report | (yellow card) Indio | Stadium: Estadio Santiago Bernabéu; Referee: Pedro Elordi |

| 14 April 1974 30 | Racing Santander | 2–1 | Real Madrid | Santander |
| | Grande 20'; Sebas 30' | Report | 83' Aguilar | Stadium: Estadio El Sardinero; Referee: Mariano Iglesias |

| 21 April 1974 31 | Real Madrid | 6–1 | Celta Vigo | Madrid |
| | Mas 3'; Mas 63'; Mas 86'; Marañon 14'; Marañon 31'; AGuilar 72' | Report | 36' Jimenez; (yellow card) Aparicio | Stadium: Estadio Santiago Bernabéu; Referee: Ricardo Coscolin |

| 27 April 1974 32 | Español | 1–0 | Real Madrid | Barcelona |
| | De Diego 14' | Report | | Stadium: Sarrià; Referee: Emilio Muro |

| 5 May 1974 33 | Real Madrid | 3–1 | Real Sociedad | Madrid |
| | Murillo 60' (o.g.); Mas 61'; Amancio 68' | Report | 72' Arzak; (yellow card) Martinez; (yellow card) Contabarria | Stadium: Estadio Santiago Bernabéu; Referee: Jose Segreles |

| 12 May 1974 34 | Sporting Gijón | 4–3 | Real Madrid | Gijón |
| | Quini 14'; Quini 31'; Leal 57'; Ciriaco 73' (pen.) | Report | 39' Velazquez; 52' Amancio; 83' Amancio | Stadium: Estadio El Molinon; Referee: Jose Segreles |

=== Copa del Generalísimo ===
==== Final ====
| 28 June 1974 | Real Madrid | 4–0 | Barcelona | Vicente Calderón Stadium, Madrid |
| 21:00 CET | Santillana 5'; Rubiñán 46'; Aguilar 50'; Pirri 83' | Report (in Spanish) | | Attendance: 48,000; Referee: Antonio Sánchez Ríos |

=== UEFA Cup ===
==== First round ====
| 13 September 1973 | Ipswich Town (England) | 1–0 | (Spain) Real Madrid | Ipswich |
| | | Report |

| 27 September 1973 | Real Madrid (Spain) | 0–0 | (England) Ipswich Town | Madrid |
| | | Report | | Stadium: Estadio Santiago Bernabéu |

== Statistics ==
=== Players statistics ===
| No. | Pos | Nat | Player | Total | | Primera Division | | Copa del Generalísimo | | UEFA Cup | |
| No. | Pos | Nat | Player | Apps | Goals | Apps | Goals | Apps | Goals | Apps | Goals |
|---|---|---|---|---|---|---|---|---|---|---|---|
| | GK | (Spain) ESP | García Remón | 17 | -15 | 15 | -14 | 0 | 0 | 2 | -1 |
| | DF | (Spain) ESP | Goyo Benito | 39 | 6 | 31 | 0 | 6 | 6 | 2 | 0 |
| | DF | (Spain) ESP | José Luis | 36 | 8 | 27 | 1 | 7 | 7 | 2 | 0 |
| | DF | (Spain) ESP | Zoco | 23 | 1 | 19+1 | 1 | 0+2 | 0 | 1 | 0 |
| | DF | (Argentina) ARG | Touriño | 30 | 0 | 24 | 0 | 3+1 | 0 | 2 | 0 |
| | MF | (Spain) ESP | Pirri | 37 | 11 | 28 | 7 | 7 | 4 | 2 | 0 |
| | MF | (Spain) ESP | Grosso | 35 | 1 | 17+9 | 0 | 7 | 1 | 2 | 0 |
| | MF | (Spain) ESP | Velazquez | 32 | 6 | 26 | 4 | 6 | 2 | | |
| | FW | (Spain) ESP | Amancio | 30 | 8 | 26 | 8 | 3 | 0 | 1 | 0 |
| | FW | (Argentina) ARG | Oscar Más | 29 | 11 | 26+1 | 11 | 0 | 0 | 2 | 0 |
| | FW | (West Germany) FRG | Netzer | 26 | 0 | 25 | 0 | 0 | 0 | 1 | 0 |
| | GK | (Spain) ESP | Junquera | 17 | -18 | 16+1 | -18 | 0 | 0 | | |
| | DF | (Spain) ESP | Verdugo | 20 | 0 | 14+4 | 0 | 2 | 0 | | |
| | FW | (Spain) ESP | Ico Aguilar | 21 | 7 | 13+1 | 4 | 4+1 | 3 | 1+1 | 0 |
| | FW | (Spain) ESP | Santillana | 24 | 10 | 11+7 | 3 | 6 | 7 | | |
| | MF | (Spain) ESP | Del Bosque | 24 | 5 | 11+5 | 0 | 7 | 5 | 1 | 0 |
| | FW | (Spain) ESP | Marañon | 26 | 5 | 9+10 | 4 | 1+4 | 1 | 0+2 | 0 |
| | DF | (Spain) ESP | Macanas | 16 | 4 | 8+1 | 3 | 7 | 1 | | |
| | DF | (Spain) ESP | Morgado | 8 | 0 | 8 | 0 | | | | |
| | DF | (Spain) ESP | Planelles | 10 | 1 | 8 | 1 | 0 | 0 | 2 | 0 |
| | DF | (Spain) ESP | Benito Rubiñán | 14 | 2 | 5+2 | 0 | 4+2 | 2 | 1 | 0 |
| | DF | (Spain) ESP | Camacho | 5 | 0 | 4+1 | 0 | | | | |
| | GK | (Spain) ESP | Miguel Ángel | 12 | -12 | 3+2 | -6 | 7 | -6 | | |
| | DF | (Spain) ESP | San José | 0 | 0 | 0 | 0 | 0 | 0 | | |

- Source: https://www.bdfutbol.com/en/t/t1973-742.html
