= Miguel Ángel (footballer, born 1947) =

Spanish footballer (1947–2024)

Personal information
- Full name: Miguel Ángel González Suárez
- Date of birth: 24 December 1947
- Place of birth: Ourense, Spain
- Date of death: 6 February 2024 (aged 76)
- Place of death: Madrid, Spain
- Height: 1.74 m (5 ft 9 in)
- Position: Goalkeeper

Youth career
- Couto

Senior career*
Years	Team	Apps	(Gls)
1966–1967	Atlético Orense		
1967–1986	Real Madrid	247	(0)
1967–1968	→ Castellón (loan)	26	(0)
Total		273	(0)

International career
1975	Spain amateur	1	(0)
1975–1978	Spain	18	(0)
- * Club domestic league appearances and goals

Miguel Ángel González Suárez (Spanish pronunciation: [mi(ˈ)ɣel ˈaŋxel ɣonˈθaleθ ˈswaɾeθ]; 24 December 1947 – 6 February 2024), known as Miguel Ángel, was a Spanish professional footballer who played as a goalkeeper.

He all but spent his career with Real Madrid, making 346 competitive appearances.

== Club career ==
Miguel Ángel was born in Ourense, Galicia. During his career, after making his beginnings at handball, he played for AD Couto (later renamed Atlético Orense), CD Castellón and Real Madrid, having an 18-year spell with the latter club and being first choice from 1974 to 1978 and in two of his final three seasons; he conquered six La Liga championships, being an active part in four of those.

Miguel Ángel retired in June 1986, aged 38. Subsequently, he remained attached to Real in several capacities.

== International career ==
Miguel Ángel earned 18 caps for the Spain national team. He made his debut on 12 October 1975 in a 2–0 win against Denmark for the UEFA Euro 1976 qualifiers, held in Barcelona.

Miguel Ángel was included in the squad for the 1978 FIFA World Cup, where he started. He was a last-minute addition to the 1982 edition on home soil, as manager José Santamaría preferred to select three goalkeepers; he did not play in the latter tournament.

== Personal life and death ==
On 17 December 2022, Miguel Ángel was diagnosed with ALS; Real Madrid expressed support for his fight against the disease in an official statement. He died on 6 February 2024, at the age of 76.

== Career statistics ==
=== Club ===
Appearances and goals by club, season and competition
Club	Season	League			Copa del Rey		Copa de la Liga		Continental		Other		Total	
Club	Season	Division	Apps	Goals	Apps	Goals	Apps	Goals	Apps	Goals	Apps	Goals	Apps	Goals
Real Madrid	1967–68	La Liga	0	0	0	0	—		0	0	—		0	0
Real Madrid	1968–69	La Liga	0	0	0	0	—		0	0	—		0	0
Real Madrid	1969–70	La Liga	3	0	0	0	—		0	0	—		3	0
Real Madrid	1970–71	La Liga	7	0	0	0	—		3 (Note: Appearances in European Cup Winners' Cup)	0	—		10	0
Real Madrid	1971–72	La Liga	6	0	0	0	—		0	0	—		6	0
Real Madrid	1972–73	La Liga	8	0	0	0	—		2 (Note: Appearances in European Cup)	0	—		10	0
Real Madrid	1973–74	La Liga	5	0	7	0	—		0	0	—		12	0
Real Madrid	1974–75	La Liga	31	0	6	0	—		6	0	—		43	0
Real Madrid	1975–76	La Liga	32	0	3	0	–		8	0	—		43	0
Real Madrid	1976–77	La Liga	33	0	2	0	—		4	0	—		39	0
Real Madrid	1977–78	La Liga	27	0	7	0	—		—		—		34	0
Real Madrid	1978–79	La Liga	16	0	1	0	—		3	0	—		20	0
Real Madrid	1979–80	La Liga	1	0	5	0	—		1	0	—		7	0
Real Madrid	1980–81	La Liga	2	0	0	0	—		1	0	—		3	0
Real Madrid	1981–82	La Liga	18	0	0	0	—		5 (Note: Appearances in UEFA Cup)	0	—		23	0
Real Madrid	1982–83	La Liga	0	0	1	0	4	0	0	0	0	0	5	0
Real Madrid	1983–84	La Liga	28	0	11	0	2	0	0	0	—		41	0
Real Madrid	1984–85	La Liga	30	0	2	0	3	0	12	0	—		47	0
Real Madrid	1985–86	La Liga	0	0	0	0	0	0	0	0	—		0	0
Real Madrid	Total		247	0	45	0	9	0	45	0	0	0	346	0
Castellón (loan)	1967–68	Segunda División	26	0	3	0	—		—		—		29	0
Career total			273	0	48	0	9	0	45	0	0	0	375	0

=== International ===
Appearances and goals by national team and year
National team	Year	Apps	Goals
Spain	1975	2	0
Spain	1976	2	0
Spain	1977	4	0
Spain	1978	10	0
Total		18	0

== Honours ==
Real Madrid

- La Liga: 1971–72, 1974–75, 1975–76, 1977–78, 1978–79, 1979–80
- Copa del Rey: 1969–70, 1973–74, 1974–75, 1979–80, 1981–82
- Copa de la Liga: 1985
- UEFA Cup: 1984–85

Individual

- Ricardo Zamora Trophy: 1975–76
- Don Balón Award: 1975–76
