= Mariano García Remón =

Spanish football player and manager (born 1950)

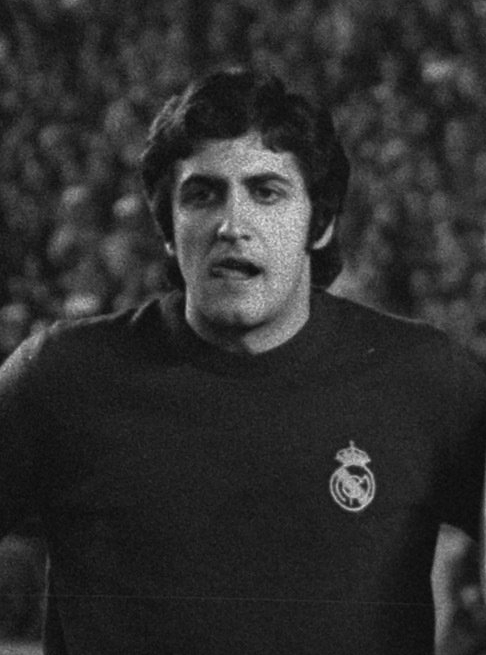
- Remón with Real Madrid in 1973

Personal information
- Full name: Mariano García Remón
- Date of birth: 30 September 1950 (age 76)
- Place of birth: Madrid, Spain
- Height: 1.81 m (5 ft 11 in)
- Position: Goalkeeper

Youth career
- 1965–1966: Rayo Vallecano
- 1966–1970: Real Madrid

Senior career*
| Years | Team | Apps | (Gls) |
| 1970–1986 | Real Madrid | 177 | (0) |
| 1970 | → Talavera (loan) | | |
| 1970–1971 | → Oviedo (loan) | 24 | (0) |
| Total | | 201 | (0) |

International career
| 1971 | Spain U23 | 1 | (0) |
| 1971 | Spain amateur | 1 | (0) |
| 1973 | Spain | 2 | (0) |

Managerial career
- 1987: Real Madrid B
- 1990–1993: Real Madrid B
- 1993–1995: Sporting Gijón
- 1996–1997: Albacete
- 1997–1998: Las Palmas
- 1999–2000: Salamanca
- 2000–2001: Numancia
- 2002: Córdoba
- 2004: Real Madrid (assistant)
- 2004: Real Madrid
- 2007: Cádiz
- * Club domestic league appearances and goals

Mariano García Remón (born 30 September 1950) is a Spanish former professional football goalkeeper and manager.

He was best known for his spell at Real Madrid, which he helped to six La Liga and three Copa del Rey trophies. He subsequently worked as a coach, having a brief stint with his main club.

== Playing career ==
Born in Madrid, Remón finished his football development with Real Madrid, but served two loans in the Tercera División and the Segunda División before returning in 1971. He then began an interesting battle for first-choice status with Miguel Ángel González which would last for the vast majority of his stay: Remón would start from 1971 to 1973 and 1979 to 1981, and the pair split appearances in two other seasons.

In the quarter-finals of the 1972–73 European Cup against FC Dynamo Kyiv, in the 0–0 first leg draw in Odesa, Remón's heroic efforts in the first leg held in Odesa (a 0–0 draw) earned him the nickname "Cat of Odessa". After only eight La Liga appearances over his final five seasons, being third-choice for the side that won back-to-back UEFA Cups, he retired aged 35 with 231 competitive appearances for the club to his credit.

Remón earned two caps for Spain in five months, both in 1973 friendlies. His debut came on 2 May, when he played the second half of a 3–2 loss in the Netherlands.

== Coaching career ==
Remón's coaching career started with the youth sides of Real Madrid. He progressed to their reserves from there, preceding his assistant Rafael Benítez.

Subsequently, Remón managed Sporting de Gijón (top division), Albacete Balompié, UD Las Palmas, UD Salamanca, CD Numancia (top flight) and Córdoba CF. Both of his appointments in that competition ended prematurely, when the teams were in a relegation position.

In the 2004–05 campaign, Remón became assistant coach to newly appointed José Antonio Camacho, his Real Madrid teammate for 13 years. On 20 September 2004 the former succeeded the latter, who resigned just a few weeks after arriving when Real were in eighth place. Remón himself was sacked due to poor results by Christmas, and replaced by former Brazilian national side boss Vanderlei Luxemburgo; he collected 12 wins, four draws and four losses during his tenure.

Ahead of 2007–08's second tier, Remón succeeded José González at the helm of Cádiz CF, being dismissed on 11 October 2007 as the club eventually failed to return to the main division.

== Honours ==
=== Player ===
Real Madrid

- La Liga: 1971–72, 1974–75, 1975–76, 1977–78, 1978–79, 1979–80
- Copa del Rey: 1974–75, 1979–80, 1981–82

=== Manager ===
Castilla

- Segunda División B: 1990–91
