= Isidoro San José =

Spanish footballer

Personal information
- Full name: Isidoro San José Pozo
- Date of birth: 27 October 1955 (age 71)
- Place of birth: Madrid, Spain
- Height: 1.76 m (5 ft 9 in)
- Position: Fullback

Youth career
- 1968–1974: Real Madrid

Senior career*
Years	Team	Apps	(Gls)
1974–1976	Castilla		
1976–1986	Real Madrid	183	(3)
1986–1987	Mallorca	17	(0)
Total		200	(3)

International career
1974	Spain U18	5	(0)
1976–1977	Spain U21	3	(0)
1976	Spain amateur	2	(0)
1977–1979	Spain	13	(0)
- * Club domestic league appearances and goals

Isidoro San José Pozo (born 27 October 1955) is a Spanish former footballer. Mainly a right back he could also play on the other flank, and even as a defensive midfielder.

During one full decade he represented La Liga giants Real Madrid, winning a total of nine major titles and amassing competition totals of 200 games and three goals.

== Club career ==
Born in Madrid, San José arrived in Real Madrid's youth academy at the age of 12. During the 1973–74 season, at only 18, he made his first-team debuts, playing in two rounds of the Copa del Rey against Granada CF and UD Las Palmas but not being picked for the final because the juniors' coach, Manuel Sanchís Martínez, decided he should play, as captain, in the equivalent match of the category, the opponent also being FC Barcelona.

After two years with Real Madrid Castilla, San José was promoted to the main squad, appearing three times in La Liga in 1976–77 but amassing 77 appearances in the following three campaigns combined, as the team won consecutive league accolades. However, during a league game at Sporting de Gijón late into 1979, he suffered a meniscus injury which kept him out of the pitches for more than one year; the situation was aggravated after the player, not fully recovered yet, was summoned for the cup final against Valencia CF.

In his last two years, San José only appeared in 30 league matches combined, but still contributed to back-to-back UEFA Cups and the 1986 national championship – at that time, he had already lost his position to another youth graduate, Chendo. He retired in June 1987 at nearly 32 after one season with RCD Mallorca, contributing relatively as the Balearic Islands side retained their top division status.

After retiring, San José stayed connected with Real Madrid, running football camps for children connected with the club's foundation alongside former Real Madrid teammate Enrique Magdaleno.

== International career ==
San José earned 13 caps for the Spain national team in two years. His debut came on 30 November 1977 in a 1978 FIFA World Cup qualifier in Belgrade against Yugoslavia, and he was also picked for the final stages in Argentina, playing all three matches in an eventual group stage exit (one win, one loss and one draw).

Previously, San José also competed internationally at the 1976 Summer Olympics.

== Honours ==
Real Madrid

- La Liga: 1977–78, 1978–79, 1979–80, 1985–86
- Copa del Rey: 1973–74, 1979–80, 1981–82
- Copa de la Liga: 1985
- UEFA Cup: 1984–85, 1985–86
