= Alberto Vitoria =

Spanish footballer (1956–2010)

Personal information
- Full name: Alberto Vitoria Soria
- Date of birth: 11 January 1956
- Place of birth: Ágreda, Spain
- Date of death: 26 April 2010 (aged 54)
- Place of death: Zaragoza, Spain
- Height: 1.71 m (5 ft 7 in)
- Position: Midfielder

Youth career
- 1970–1972: Real Madrid

Senior career*
Years	Team	Apps	(Gls)
1972–1974	Castilla		
1974–1979	Real Madrid	57	(1)
1979–1981	Burgos	55	(6)
1981–1984	Granada	101	(28)
1984–1985	Rayo Vallecano	27	(6)
Total		240	(41)

International career
1972–1974	Spain U18	8	(1)
1977	Spain U21	2	(0)
1976	Spain amateur	2	(0)
- * Club domestic league appearances and goals

Alberto Vitoria Soria (11 January 1956 – 26 April 2010) was a Spanish professional footballer who played as a midfielder.

== Club career ==
Vitoria was born in Ágreda, Province of Soria, Castile and León, being the sixth of seven children. He spent nine years with Real Madrid all categories comprised, playing five seasons with the first team; he made his La Liga debut on 7 September 1974 at the age of 18, playing 52 minutes in a 2–1 away win against Valencia CF.

Vitoria received little playing time, however, during his senior spell at the Santiago Bernabéu Stadium, his best output being 20 games and one goal in the 1976–77 campaign, precisely when the club did not win any major trophies. On 27 February 1977 he became the first player from his native region to score in the top division, in a 4–2 home victory over Real Zaragoza.

Leaving Real Madrid in summer 1979 after appearing in 88 competitive matches, Vitoria signed for Burgos CF, being relegated from the top flight in his first year. He then spent three seasons with Granada CF (two in Segunda División B, one in Segunda División), retiring in June 1985 at the age of 29 with Rayo Vallecano, which he helped promote to the second level.

== International career ==
Vitoria represented Spain at the 1976 Summer Olympics in Montreal, appearing in two group stage losses (the only games the national team played in the tournament after Nigeria withdrew).

== Death ==
Vitoria died on 26 April 2010 in Zaragoza, Aragon, due to heart failure. He was 54 years old.

== Honours ==
Real Madrid

- La Liga: 1974–75, 1975–76, 1977–78, 1978–79
- Copa del Rey: 1974–75
