= Goyo Benito =

Spanish footballer (1946–2020)

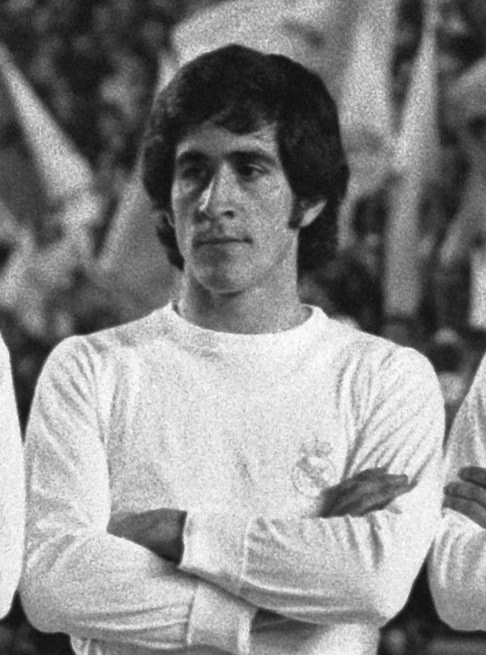
- Benito in 1973

Personal information
- Full name: Gregorio Benito Rubio
- Date of birth: 21 October 1946
- Place of birth: Puente del Arzobispo, Spain
- Date of death: 2 April 2020 (aged 73)
- Place of death: Madrid, Spain
- Height: 1.80 m (5 ft 11 in)
- Position: Centre-back

Youth career
- Salesianos Atocha
- 1963–1966: Real Madrid

Senior career*
Years	Team	Apps	(Gls)
1966–1982	Real Madrid	317	(2)
1966–1968	→ Rayo Vallecano (loan)	43	(0)
Total		360	(2)

International career
1969–1970	Spain U23	2	(0)
1966–1970	Spain amateur	13	(0)
1971–1978	Spain	22	(0)
- * Club domestic league appearances and goals

Gregorio "Goyo" Benito Rubio (21 October 1946 – 2 April 2020) was a Spanish footballer who played as a central defender. He spent most of his 16-year professional career with Real Madrid.

== Club career ==
Benito was born in El Puente del Arzobispo, Province of Toledo, Castilla–La Mancha. After practising track and field in his early teens, inclusively being national javelin throw champion at school level, he signed for La Liga powerhouse Real Madrid in the summer of 1963, aged nearly 17. After two years on loan to neighbouring Rayo Vallecano in the Segunda División (his second being cut short as he was called for military service in Sidi Ifni), he returned to his main club, remaining there the following 14 seasons and winning six leagues and five Copa del Rey.

In 1982, after a total of just 16 league appearances in his last two seasons, Benito retired from football at the age of 35 and with Real Madrid competitive totals of 420 games and three goals. For his services to the club, he was only one of two players to have the Laureada being bestowed upon him by president Santiago Bernabéu – the other being Pirri.

== International career ==
Benito earned 22 caps for Spain over roughly seven years. His debut was on 9 May 1971 in a 2–0 away win against Cyprus in the UEFA Euro 1972 qualifiers, but he would never take part in any major international tournament as the national team failed to qualify for any during that timeframe.

Additionally, Benito was part of the squad at the 1968 Summer Olympics in Mexico, playing all the matches for the eventual quarter-finalists.

== Death ==
Benito spent his final years in a nursing home in Madrid, suffering from Alzheimer's disease. On 2 April 2020, he died of COVID-19 at the age of 73 after his residence was one of several hit by the pandemic.

== Honours ==
Real Madrid

- La Liga: 1971–72, 1974–75, 1975–76, 1977–78, 1978–79, 1979–80
- Copa del Rey: 1969–70, 1973–74, 1974–75, 1979–80, 1981–82
- European Cup runner-up: 1980–81
- European Cup Winners' Cup runner-up: 1970–71
