= Francisco Uría =

Spanish footballer

Personal information
- Full name: Francisco Javier Álvarez Uría
- Date of birth: 1 February 1950 (age 76)
- Place of birth: Gijón, Spain
- Height: 1.74 m (5 ft 9 in)
- Position: Left back

Youth career
- Veriña
- Portuarios

Senior career*
| Years | Team | Apps | (Gls) |
| 1968–1974 | Oviedo | 182 | (17) |
| 1974–1977 | Real Madrid | 39 | (1) |
| 1977–1983 | Sporting Gijón | 172 | (7) |
| 1983–1984 | Oviedo | 32 | (6) |
| Total | | 425 | (31) |

International career
| 1973 | Spain U23 | 1 | (0) |
| 1975–1976 | Spain amateur | 2 | (0) |
| 1973–1980 | Spain | 14 | (0) |
- * Club domestic league appearances and goals

Francisco Javier Álvarez Uría (born 1 February 1950) is a Spanish former footballer who played as a left back.

== Club career ==
Born in Gijón, Asturias, Uría played in La Liga during 11 consecutive seasons, starting with Real Oviedo in 1972–73. After the team's relegation the following year he signed with national powerhouse Real Madrid, being relatively used in two of his three seasons and winning his entire silverware.

In 1977, aged 27, Uría moved to Oviedo neighbours Sporting de Gijón, starting regularly during his spell as they achieved three top-five finishes, with four UEFA Cup participations. He retired at 34 after playing one year with his first club, now in the second division.

== International career ==
Uría earned 14 caps for Spain during seven years, and participated in the 1978 FIFA World Cup and UEFA Euro 1980. His debut came on 21 October 1973 in a 1974 World Cup qualifier in Zagreb against Yugoslavia; that game ended 0–0, and both sides were level on points after the sixth round, thus having to compete in a playoff match (0–1 loss).

== Honours ==
Real Madrid

- La Liga: 1974–75, 1975–76
- Copa del Generalísimo: 1974–75
