= Benito Rubiñán =

Spanish footballer (born 1949)

Personal information
- Full name: Benito Rubiñán Soutullo
- Date of birth: 11 September 1949 (age 77)
- Place of birth: Redondela, Spain
- Height: 1.76 m (5 ft 9 in)
- Position: Defender

Senior career*
| Years | Team | Apps | (Gls) |
| 1969–1970 | Orense | 30 | (5) |
| 1970–1973 | Deportivo La Coruña | 84 | (9) |
| 1973–1977 | Real Madrid | 70 | (6) |
| 1977–1980 | Burgos | 58 | (3) |
| 1980–1981 | Murcia | 28 | (0) |
| Total | | 270 | (23) |
- * Club domestic league appearances and goals

Benito Rubiñán Soutullo (born 11 September 1949) is a Spanish former footballer who played as a defender.

He played 212 games and scored 15 goals in La Liga for Deportivo La Coruña, Real Madrid, Burgos and Murcia. He won the league title and the national cup twice each with the second of those clubs, including a double in 1975.

== Career ==
=== Early career ===
Born in Redondela, Province of Pontevedra, Rubiñán began his career in his native Galicia with Orense and Deportivo de La Coruña, both in the Segunda División. He achieved promotion to La Liga with the latter in 1970–71. After Depor were relegated in 1973, he transferred to Real Madrid.

=== Real Madrid ===
In the first round of the UEFA Cup on 19 September 1973, Rubiñán deflected Mick Mills's shot into his own net as Real Madrid lost 1–0 away to Ipswich Town in England; a goalless draw in the second leg saw his team eliminated.

On 17 June 1974, Rubiñán scored in a 5–0 home win over Las Palmas in the semi-finals of the Copa del Generalísimo; Twelve days later, he scored in a 4–0 final win over Barcelona in an El Clásico fixture. He was part of the Real Madrid team that won the double in 1974–75, scoring his attempt in the penalty shootout win over Atlético Madrid in the cup final on 5 July. During his time in the Spanish capital, Rubiñán shared a flat with Vicente Del Bosque, later manager of the Spain national football team.

Rubiñán scored an own goal to eliminate his team from Europe for a second time on 3 November 1976, in a 2–0 loss at Club Brugge in the European Cup second round.

=== Later career ===
In 1977, Rubiñán received an offer from Celta Vigo of his native province, but was obliged to move to Burgos as Juanito had moved in the other direction to Real Madrid. In May 1980, he appeared before a committee due to allegations that Burgos players had accepted 200,000 Spanish pesetas each from Real Madrid to beat the latter's title rivals Real Sociedad; he said "I wish we had received that money! We haven't made that much this year with bonuses from Burgos!".

After Burgos's relegation, Rubiñán moved in August 1980 to Real Murcia on a one-year deal. He received a 2 million peseta payment for signing, with a bonus of the same amount if he were to make 25 appearances. For the second consecutive season, he suffered relegation from the top flight.

As of 2014, Rubiñán was working for Real Madrid as an ambassador and a scout. He said that 100-150 children trialled for the club every week, of which the scouts chose two or three.
