= Roberto Martínez (footballer, born 1946) =

Spanish footballer

Personal information
- Full name: Roberto Juan Martínez Martínez
- Date of birth: 25 September 1946 (age 80)
- Place of birth: Mendoza, Argentina
- Position: Forward

Senior career*
Years	Team	Apps	(Gls)
1970	Unión de Santa Fe	26	(8)
1971	Banfield	9	(7)
1971–1974	Espanyol	75	(22)
1974–1980	Real Madrid	141	(42)
1980–1982	Espanyol	58	(17)
Total		309	(96)

International career
1973–1974	Spain	5	(2)
- * Club domestic league appearances and goals

Roberto Juan Martínez Martínez (born 25 September 1946) is a former footballer who played as a forward. Born in Argentina, he represented the Spain national team.

== Club career ==
Martínez was born in Argentina, but naturalized as a Spanish citizen and played for the Spain national team. Known as a long-beard, he was a good header and good kicker with his right leg. He began his career in Argentina where he defended the colors of Nueva Chicago club in Primera B, club held a strong dispute over an unconsumed transfer to the Cerro de Montevideo club. This meant a suspension for two years, which was about to mean his goodbye to the world of football. Finally the sanction was reduced to him and card by Huracán Las Heras to the league of Mendoza, later by Unión de Santa Fe of the maximum category that finished descending, and Banfield. After briefly playing for Millonarios of Bogotá, in 1971 he moved to Barcelona to sign up for Espanyol under the orders of José Emilio Santamaría. He remained in the club for three seasons, until 1974. In the 1972–73 season, he was the top scorer in the team with 14 goals. During that season he formed a great front line with Juan María Amiano, author of 13 goals, and together they were vital in helping the club to classify for the UEFA Cup. In July 1974 he signed for Real Madrid, a club that paid a transfer of 15 million pesetas. In the white club he played for six seasons, and in total, he won five Leagues and two Cups at the club, playing 141 league matches and scoring 42 goals. In 1980 he returned to Espanyol, where he played two more seasons, until 1982. In his return to Sarrià he joined the front with Rafael Marañón. In total, he played 111 league games in the club in which he scored 36 goals.

== International career ==
Martínez adopted Spanish nationality and played five games with the selection, three of them while he was a player of Espanyol.

== Honours ==
Real Madrid

- La Liga: 1974–75, 1975–76, 1977–78, 1978–79, 1979–80
- Copa del Rey: 1974–75, 1979–80

== See also ==
- List of Spain international footballers born outside Spain
