= Francisco Aguilar (footballer, born 1949) =

Spanish footballer (1949–2020)

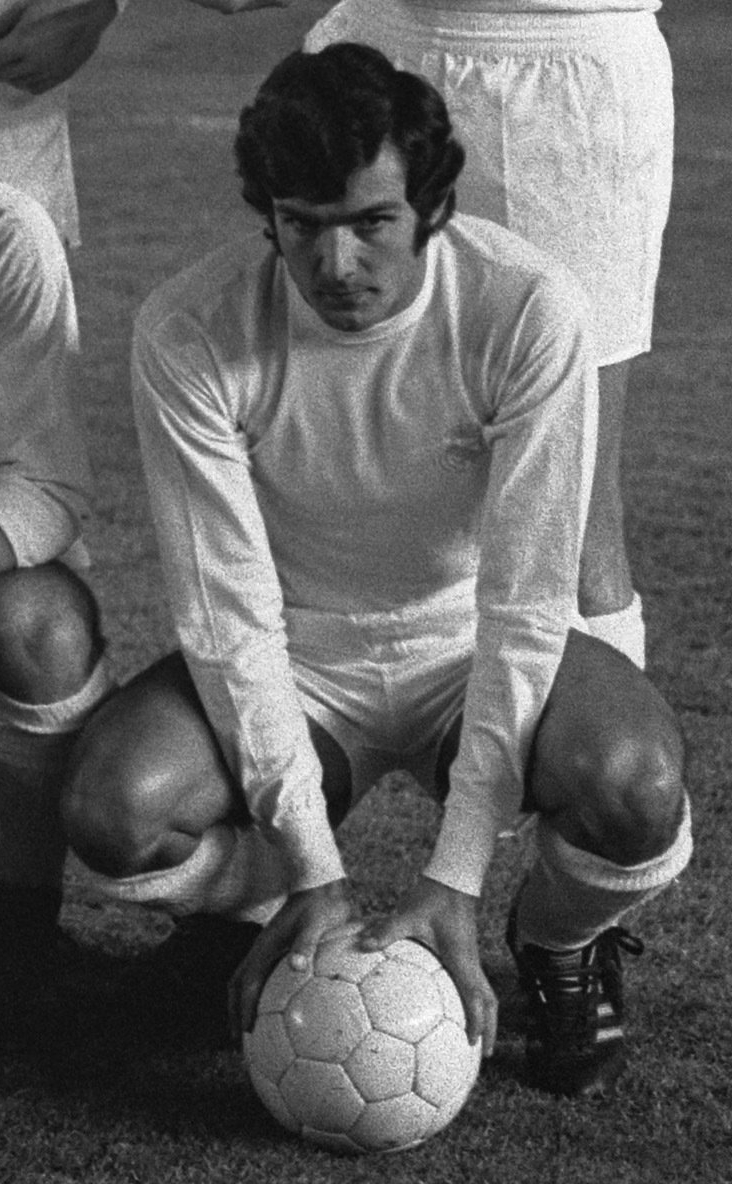
- Aguilar with Real Madrid in 1973

Personal information
- Full name: Francisco Javier Aguilar García
- Date of birth: 26 March 1949
- Place of birth: Santander, Spain
- Date of death: 11 May 2020 (aged 71)
- Place of death: Madrid, Spain
- Height: 1.72 m (5 ft 8 in)
- Position: Forward

Youth career
- Racing Santander

Senior career*
Years	Team	Apps	(Gls)
1968–1971	Racing Santander	37	(10)
1971–1979	Real Madrid	144	(34)
1979–1981	Sporting Gijón	46	(6)
1981–1983	Rayo Vallecano	73	(18)
Total		300	(68)

International career
1971	Spain U23	1	(1)
1971–1973	Spain	3	(1)
- * Club domestic league appearances and goals

Francisco Javier Aguilar García (26 March 1949 – 11 May 2020) was a Spanish professional footballer who played as a forward.

== Club career ==
Born in Santander, Aguilar started his career with local Racing de Santander, making his senior debut at 19 and helping the Cantabrians to achieve promotion to Segunda División in 1970. The following year, he signed with La Liga powerhouse Real Madrid alongside teammate Santillana, finishing his first season with 31 matches (28 starts) and six goals as the team won the national championship; he added three in only four appearances in the UEFA Cup, but they were eliminated in the second round.

Safe for two seasons, Aguilar was regularly used during his spell, winning five leagues and two Copa del Rey – including the double in the 1974–75 campaign – and appearing in 190 competitive games. In the summer of 1979 he joined Sporting de Gijón, playing regularly but only managing to score on six occasions in the domestic league.

Aguilar retired from football in June 1983 at the age of 34, after two years with another club in Madrid, second-tier Rayo Vallecano (12 goals from 36 appearances in his first). Over ten seasons, he amassed top-flight totals of 190 matches and 40 goals.

== International career ==
In one year and a half, Aguilar played three matches for Spain. He made his debut on 24 November 1971 in a UEFA Euro 1972 qualifier against Cyprus in Granada, replacing his Real Madrid teammate Amancio Amaro at half-time and scoring the fifth goal in an eventual 7–0 rout.

Aguilar also represented the nation at under-23 level.

== Death ==
Aguilar died on 11 May 2020 in Madrid aged 71, due to cancer.
