= 1974–75 Copa del Generalísimo =

73rd Copa del Rey

Tournament details
- Country: Spain
- Teams: 114

Final positions
- Champions: Real Madrid (13th title)
- Runners-up: Club Atlético de Madrid

Tournament statistics
- Matches played: 225

The 1974–75 Copa del Generalísimo was the 73rd staging of the Spanish Cup. The competition began on 30 October 1974 and ended on 5 July 1975.

== Third round ==
Team 1	Agg.	Team 2	1st leg	2nd leg
AD Almería	5–6	Cádiz CF	3–3	2–3
CD Béjar Industrial	3–4	Baracaldo CF	2–2	1–2
CD Basconia	0–6	CD Tenerife	0–0	0–6
Barcelona Atlético	4–3	Castilla CF	2–0	2–3
Burgos CF	5–3	CD Manresa	4–2	1–1
Córdoba CF	5–1	Villarreal CF	4–0	1–1
AD Ceuta	2–3	CD Castellón	2–0	0–3
Deportivo La Coruña	1–2	CD Orense	0–0	1–2
SD Huesca	0–1	CD Alavés	0–0	0–1
Xerez CD	1–2	Cultural Leonesa	0–0	1–2
CD Lugo	1–6	Gimnástico de Tarragona	1–1	0–5
RCD Mallorca	3–3 (6–5 (p.))	RCD Carabanchel	2–0	1–3
CD Olímpico	2–3	Recreativo de Huelva	2–2	0–1
Real Oviedo	4–2	Real Jaén	3–2	1–0
Racing de Santander	2–3	Levante UD	2–1	0–2
Rayo Vallecano	4–0	SD Eibar	2–0	2–0
CD Sabadell CF	4–2	CD Mirandés	1–0	3–2
Gimnástica de Torrelavega	1–2	CD San Andrés	1–0	0–2
Sevilla CF	2–1	CD Ensidesa	2–0	0–1
Real Valladolid	3–5	CD Constancia	2–1	1–4

Source: RSSSF

== Fourth round ==
Team 1	Agg.	Team 2	1st leg	2nd leg
CD Alavés	0–3	CD San Andrés	0–1	0–2
Baracaldo CF	3–4	CD Orense	2–2	1–2
Barcelona Atlético	3–2	UD Salamanca	2–1	1–1
Burgos CF	3–2	Real Murcia	3–1	0–1
Córdoba CF	2–3	Hércules CF	1–0	1–3
Elche CF	0–3	Recreativo de Huelva	0–1	0–2
RCD Español	2–1	Cádiz CF	2–1	0–0
UD Las Palmas	3–1	CD Tenerife	2–0	1–1
Cultural Leonesa	4–2	CD Castellón	4–0	0–2
Levante UD	3–3 (2–3 (p.))	Sporting Gijón	0–1	3–2
Real Oviedo	5–2	CD Sabadell CF	3–0	2–2
Rayo Vallecano	4–5	Valencia CF	3–4	1–1
Sevilla CF	3–4	Celta Vigo	2–0	1–4
Gimnástico de Tarragona	3–1	CD Constancia	2–0	1–1

Source: RSSSF

- Bye: RCD Mallorca and Real Betis.

== Fifth round ==
Team 1	Agg.	Team 2	1st leg	2nd leg
Real Betis	3–2	Gimnástico de Tarragona	3–1	0–1
Recreativo de Huelva	3–5	Celta Vigo	2–1	1–4
Hércules CF	3–6	Barcelona Atlético	2–0	1–6
UD Las Palmas	3–2	RCD Español	1–1	2–1
Cultural Leonesa	3–3 (3–4 (p.))	CD Orense	2–0	1–3
Real Oviedo	1–1 (4–5 (p.))	Burgos CF	1–1	0–0
CD San Andrés	4–1	RCD Mallorca	3–0	1–1
Valencia CF	3–5	Sporting Gijón	3–2	0–3

Source: RSSSF

== Round of 16 ==
Team 1	Agg.	Team 2	1st leg	2nd leg
Club Atlético de Madrid	7–0	Barcelona Atlético	5–0	2–0
Real Betis	0–2	Athletic Club de Bilbao	0–0	0–2
Celta Vigo	5–5 (2–4 (p.))	Real Zaragoza	4–2	1–3
CD Málaga	2–3	UD Las Palmas	1–1	1–2
CD Orense	1–3	Real Madrid	0–0	1–3
Real Sociedad	4–3	Burgos CF	3–1	1–2
CD San Andrés	1–3	CF Barcelona	1–2	0–1
Sporting Gijón	1–2	Granada CF	0–0	1–2

Source: RSSSF

== Quarter-finals ==
Team 1	Agg.	Team 2	1st leg	2nd leg
Club Atlético de Madrid	3–2	Granada CF	2–0	1–2
CF Barcelona	0–1	Real Zaragoza CD	0–0	0–1
UD Las Palmas	4–5	Real Madrid CF	4–0	0–5
Real Sociedad	4–4 (5–6 (p.))	Athletic Club de Bilbao	3–1	1–3

Source: RSSSF

== Semi-finals ==
Team 1	Agg.	Team 2	1st leg	2nd leg
Club Atlético de Madrid	2–0	Athletic Club de Bilbao	2–0	0–0
Real Zaragoza CD	3–4	Real Madrid CF	2–2	1–2

Source: RSSSF

== Final ==
Team 1	Score	Team 2
Real Madrid CF	0–0 (4–3 pen)	Club Atlético de Madrid

Copa del Generalísimo
winners
Real Madrid
13th title
