= 1970–71 Real Madrid CF season =

68th season in existence of Real Madrid CF

Real Madrid CF
1970–71 season
- President: Santiago Bernabéu
- Head coach: Miguel Muñoz
- Stadium: Santiago Bernabeu
- La Liga: 4th (in UEFA Cup)
- Copa del Generalísimo: Round of 32
- European Cup Winners' Cup: Runners-up
- Top goalscorer: League: Pirri (13); All: Pirri (16)
Home colours	Away colours	Third colours

The 1970–71 season was Real Madrid Club de Fútbol's 68th season in existence and the club's 39th consecutive season in the top flight of Spanish football.

== Summary ==
The club finished in a disappointing fourth place, two points below Champion Valencia CF coached by former Real Madrid' star Alfredo Di Stéfano.

In 1971 Copa del Generalísimo the squad as Defending Champion was early eliminated in Round of 32 by Deportivo La Coruña on away goals.

It was the club's first absence in the European Cup. The team played the 7th final in Europe, a record at the time, first a draw 1–1 after extra time, and then, lost the 1971 European Cup Winners' Cup Final trophy against Chelsea F.C. 1–2 in the replay in Piraeus closing the first trophy-less season since the 1952–53 campaign. After 18 years as club player, clinching 12 league titles, 2 Copa del Generalísimo and 6 European Cups Francisco Gento is retired at the end of this season.

== Squad ==
Note: Flags indicate national team as defined under FIFA eligibility rules; some limited exceptions apply. Players may hold more than one non-FIFA nationality.

No.	Pos.	Nation	Player
—	GK	ESP	Borja
—	DF	ESP	Ignacio Zoco
—	DF	ESP	Goyo Benito
—	DF	ESP	Manuel Sanchís
—	DF	ESP	José Luis
—	MF	ESP	Manuel Velázquez
—	MF	ESP	Pirri
—	FW	ESP	Amancio Amaro
—	FW	PAR	Fleitas
—	FW	ARG	Miguel Pérez
—	FW	ESP	Manuel Bueno

No.	Pos.	Nation	Player
—	GK	ESP	Andrés Junquera
—	DF	ESP	Antonio Calpe
—	DF	ESP	Pedro de Felipe
—	FW	ESP	Ramón Grosso
—	FW	ESP	Francisco Gento
—	GK	ESP	Antonio Betancort
—	DF	ESP	Fernando Zunzunegui
—	MF	ESP	Grande
—	DF	ESP	Babiloni
—	MF	ESP	Ortuño
—	GK	ESP	Miguel Ángel
—	MF	ESP	Planelles
—	FW	ESP	Rafael Marañón
—	DF	ARG	Touriño
—	MF	ESP	De la Fuente

=== Transfers ===
In
Pos.	Name	from	Type
DF	Touriño	Quilmes	
FW	Rafael Marañón	Real Gijón	–
DF	De La Fuente	Real Gijón	–
MF	Chato González	Real Murcia	–
FW	Jimenez	UD Salamanca	–
MF	Fermín	UD Salamanca	–

Out
Pos.	Name	To	Type
DF	Babiloni	Castellón	–
FW	Rafael de Diego	CE Sabadell CF	–
MF	Vidal	CE Sabadell CF	–
MF	Ramón Tejada	Granada CF	–
GK	Andrés Mendieta	Castellón	–

== Competitions ==
=== La Liga ===
==== Position by round ====
Round	1	2	3	4	5	6	7	8	9	10	11	12	13	14	15	16	17	18	19	20	21	22	23	24	25	26	27	28	29	30
Ground	A	H	H	A	H	A	H	A	H	A	H	A	H	A	H	H	A	A	H	A	H	A	H	A	H	A	H	A	H	A
Result	W	L	W	D	D	W	L	D	L	W	W	D	D	W	W	L	W	L	W	W	D	W	W	W	W	L	W	W	W	D
Position	1	9	5	5	5	4	5	7	8	6	4	5	4	4	4	4	4	5	5	5	5	5	3	3	3	4	4	4	4	4

Source: www.lfp.es
A = Away; H = Home; W = Win; D = Draw; L = Loss; = Leader, 1971-72 European Cup; = 1971-72 UEFA Cup; = 1971-72 Segunda Division

==== League table ====
Pos	Team	Pld	W	D	L	GF	GA	GD	Pts	Qualification or relegation
2	Barcelona	30	19	5	6	50	22	+28	43	Qualification for the Cup Winners' Cup first round (Note: Barcelona qualified to the Cup Winners' Cup as champions of the Copa del Generalísimo.)
3	Atlético Madrid	30	17	8	5	51	20	+31	42	Qualification for the UEFA Cup first round
4	Real Madrid	30	17	7	6	46	24	+22	41	Qualification for the UEFA Cup first round
5	Atlético Bilbao	30	14	7	9	40	31	+9	35	Qualification for the UEFA Cup first round
6	Celta Vigo	30	15	5	10	37	32	+5	35	Qualification for the UEFA Cup first round

Source: BDFútbol
Rules for classification: 1) Points; 2) Head-to-head results; 3) Goal difference; 4) Number of goals scored

==== Matches ====
12 September 1970 1	Real Madrid	2–0	Valencia CF	Madrid
	Pirri 4'; Pirri 65'	Report		Stadium: Santiago Bernabeu; Referee: Pedro Ilordi

20 September 1970 2	Sevilla CF	3–1	Real Madrid	Sevilla
	Acosta 1'; Berruso 57'; Costas 84'	Report	30' Grande	Stadium: Sanchez Pizjuan; Referee: Fernando Tejerina

26 September 1970 3	Real Madrid	3–2	Granada CF	Madrid
	Velazquez 22'; Amancio 47'; Pirri 80'	Report	Lasa 43'; Barrios 77'	Stadium: Santiago Bernabeu; Referee: Jose Paes

18 October 1970 4	Real Sociedad	0–0	Real Madrid	San Sebastián
		Report		Stadium: Atotxa; Referee: Mariano Iglesias

11 October 1970 5	Real Madrid	1–1	Real Gijón	Madrid
	Amancio 60'	Report	26' Valdes	Stadium: Santiago Bernabeu; Referee: Pelayo Sacristobal

19 October 1970 6	CD Málaga	0–2	Real Madrid	Málaga
		Report	15' Amancio; 60' Bueno	Stadium: Estadio La Rosaleda; Referee: Jaime Fortuny

26 October 1970 7	Real Madrid	0–1	CF Barcelona	Madrid
		Report	28' Sabalsa	Stadium: Santiago Bernabeu; Referee: Angel Martinez

1 November 1970 8	Atlético Madrid	2–2	Real Madrid	Madrid
	Adelardo 87'; Garate 89'	Report	9' Bueno; 33' Bueno	Stadium: Manzanares; Referee: Antonio Rios

15 November 1970 9	Real Madrid	1–2	Atletico de Bilbao	Madrid
	Fleitas 54'	Report	55' Clemente; 88' Argotia	Stadium: Santiago Bernabeu; Referee: Jaime Fortuny

22 November 1970 10	Real Zaragoza	0–5	Real Madrid	Zaragoza
		Report	23' Perez; 53' Perez; 34' Zunzunegui; 51' Pirri; 89' (pen.) Pirri	Stadium: La Romareda; Referee: Mariano Iglesias

29 November 1970 11	Real Madrid	4–0	Celta de Vigo	Madrid
	Bueno 3'; Fleitas 5'; Bueno 20'; Zunzunegi 45'	Report		Stadium: Santiago Bernabeu; Referee: Jose Capelastegui

6 December 1970 12	CE Sabadell CF	1–1	Real Madrid	Sabadell
	De Diego 23'	Report	60' Pirri	Stadium: Nova Creu Alta; Referee: Jose Mendibil

13 December 1970 13	Real Madrid	1–1	Elche CF	Madrid
	Zunzunegi 84'	Report	28' Lescano	Stadium: Santiago Bernabeu; Referee: Luis Diaz

14 December 1970 14	Español	0–1	Real Madrid	Barcelona
		Report	22' Perez	Stadium: Sarria; Referee: Antonio Rios

27 December 1970 15	Real Madrid	4–2	UD Las Palmas	Madrid
	Bueno 4'; Fleitas 55'; Fleitas 68'; Perez 60'	Report	32' Hermann; 63' Gilberto	Stadium: Santiago Bernabeu; Referee: Pelayo Sancristobal

3 January 1971 16	Valencia CF	1–0	Real Madrid	Valencia
	Form 31'	Report		Stadium: Estadio Mestalla; Referee: Angel Martinez

10 January 1971 17	Real Madrid	4–0	Sevilla CF	Madrid
	Pirri 42'; Amancio 47'; Fleitas 49'; LeBron 68' (o.g.)	Report		Stadium: Santiago Bernabeu; Referee: Jose Paes

17 January 1971 18	Granada CF	2–0	Real Madrid	Granada
	Lasa 16'; Vicente 56'	Report		Stadium: Los Carmenes; Referee: Alberto Alvarez

24 January 1971 19	Real Madrid	1–0	Real Sociedad	Madrid
	Sanchis 58'	Report		Stadium: Santiago Bernabeu; Referee: Jose Antinolo

31 January 1971 20	Real Gijón	0–1	Real Madrid	Gijón
		Report	10' Pirri	Stadium: Estadio El Molinón; Referee: Jose Capelastegui

7 February 1971 21	Real Madrid	2–2	CD Málaga	Madrid
	Martinez 10' (o.g.); Pirri 17' (pen.)	Report	24' Migueli; 89' Conejo	Stadium: Santiago Bernabeu; Referee: Francisco Sanchis

14 February 1971 22	CF Barcelona	0–1	Real Madrid	Barcelona
		Report	67' Grande	Stadium: Estadio del CF Barcelona; Referee: Mariano Iglesias

28 February 1971 23	Real Madrid	1–0	Atlético Madrid	Madrid
	Pirri 9'	Report		Stadium: Santiago Bernabeu; Referee: Pedro Elordi

7 March 1971 24	Athletic Bilbao	0–1	Real Madrid	Bilbao
		Report	58' Grande	Stadium: San Mamés; Referee: Jaime Fortuny

14 March 1971 25	Real Madrid	2–1	Real Zaragoza	Madrid
	Amancio 20'; Pirri 34'	Report	77' (o.g.) Benito	Stadium: Chamartín; Referee: Antinolo

21 March 1971 26	Celta de Vigo	2–0	Real Madrid	Vigo
	Jimenez 70'; Castro 87'	Report		Stadium: Estadio Balaídos; Referee: Francisco Sanchis

28 March 1971 27	Real Madrid	3–1	CE Sabadell CF	Madrid
	Amancio 32'; Pirri 51'; Bueno 63'	Report	80' Pini	Stadium: Santiago Bernabeu; Referee: Juan Elizondo

4 April 1971 28	Elche CF	0–1	Real Madrid	Elche
		Report	78' Fleitas	Stadium: Campo Altabix; Referee: Pedro Elordi

12 April 1971 29	Real Madrid	1–0	Español	Madrid
	Pirri 78'	Report		Stadium: Chamartín; Referee: Luis Diaz

18 April 1971 30	UD Las Palmas	0–0	Real Madrid	Las Palmas
		Report		Stadium: Estadio Insular; Referee: Jose Capelastegui

=== Copa del Generalísimo ===
==== Round of 32 ====
24 April 1971	Real Madrid	1–1	Deportivo La Coruña	Madrid
	Pirri 42'	Report	59' Sertukha	Stadium: Santiago Bernabeu; Referee: Juan Elizondo

2 May 1971	Deportivo La Coruña	0–0 (1a-1 agg.)	Real Madrid	La Coruña
		Report		Stadium: Estadio Riazor; Referee: Mariano Iglesias

=== European Cup Winners' Cup ===
==== Semifinals ====
14 April 1971	PSV Eindhoven (Netherlands)	0–0	(Spain) Real Madrid	Eindhoven
19:15				Stadium: Philips Stadion; Attendance: 24,000; Referee: William O'Neill (Republic of Ireland)

28 April 1971	Real Madrid (Spain)	2–1	(Netherlands) PSV Eindhoven	Madrid
21:00	Zoco 36'; Pirri 82'		58' Van den Dungen	Stadium: Santiago Bernabéu; Attendance: 60,000; Referee: Michel Kitabdjian (France)

==== Final ====
19 May 1971	Chelsea (England)	1–1 (a.e.t.)	(Spain) Real Madrid	Piraeus
	Osgood 56'	Report	Zoco 90'	Stadium: Karaiskakis Stadium; Attendance: 45,000; Referee: (Switzerland) Rudolf Scheurer

21 May 1971	Chelsea (England)	2–1	(Spain) Real Madrid	Piraeus
	Dempsey 33'; Osgood 39'	Report	Fleitas 75'	Stadium: Karaiskakis Stadium; Attendance: 19,917; Referee: (Switzerland) Anton Bucheli

== Statistics ==
=== Players statistics ===
No.	Pos	Nat	Player	Total		Primera Division		Copa		Cup Winners' Cup	
No.	Pos	Nat	Player	Apps	Goals	Apps	Goals	Apps	Goals	Apps	Goals
	GK	(Spain) ESP	Borja	25	-20	17+1	-14	2	-1	5	-5
	DF	(Spain) ESP	José Luis	28	0	21	0	0	0	6+1	0
	DF	(Spain) ESP	Zoco	36	2	27	0	1	0	8	2
	DF	(Spain) ESP	Goyo Benito	39	0	27	0	2	0	10	0
	DF	(Spain) ESP	Sanchis	31	1	19+2	1	2	0	8	0
	MF	(Spain) ESP	Pirri	41	16	29	13	2	1	10	2
	MF	(Spain) ESP	Grande	32	4	18+2	3	1+1	0	8+2	1
	MF	(Spain) ESP	Velazquez	38	2	23+3	1	2	0	10	1
	FW	(Spain) ESP	Amancio	30	6	19	6	2	0	9	0
	FW	(Paraguay) PAR	Fleitas	34	8	17+8	6	2	0	2+5	2
	FW	(Argentina) ARG	Pérez	25	4	19+1	4	0	0	3+2	0
	GK	(Spain) ESP	Miguel Ángel	10	-7	7	-6	0	0	3	-1
	DF	(Spain) ESP	De Felipe	13	0	6+4	0	1	0	2	0
	DF	(Spain) ESP	Zunzunegui	24	3	15+1	3	2	0	6	0
	FW	(Spain) ESP	Bueno	25	8	17+3	7	0	0	3+2	1
	DF	(Spain) ESP	Marañon	14	1	4+7	0	0	0	2+1	1
	FW	(Spain) ESP	Grosso	21	0	12+1	0	1+1	0	6	0
	GK	(Spain) ESP	Junquera	6	-2	4	-2	0	0	2	0
	DF	(Spain) ESP	Calpe	2	0	2	0				
	FW	(Spain) ESP	Gento	15	0	7	0	2	0	5+1	0
	GK	(Spain) ESP	Betancort	4	-2	2+1	-2	0	0	0+1	0
	FW	(Spain) ESP	Babiloni	6	0	6	0				
	DF	(Spain) ESP	Ortuño	3	0	1+1	0	0	0	0+1	0
	MF	(Spain) ESP	Planelles	11	3	7+2	0	0	0	2	3
	DF	(Argentina) ARG	Touriño	9	0	9	0				
	MF	(Spain) ESP	De la Fuente	2	0	1+1	0				

- Source: http://www.bdfutbol.com/en/t/t1970-712.html
