= 1969–70 Real Madrid CF season =

67th season in existence of Real Madrid CF

Real Madrid CF
1969–70 season
- President: Santiago Bernabéu
- Head coach: Miguel Muñoz
- Stadium: Santiago Bernabeu
- Primera Division: 6th
- Copa del Generalísimo: Winners (in European Cup Winners' Cup)
- European Cup: Round of 16
- Top goalscorer: League: Amancio (16); All: Amancio (23)
Home colours	Away colours

The 1969–70 season is Real Madrid Club de Fútbol's 67th season in existence and the club's 38th consecutive season in the top flight of Spanish football.

== Summary ==
The club finished in a disappointing sixth place marking the end of "Ye-yé" era, six points below of Champion Atlético Madrid. For second consecutive year, in European Cup the team was early eliminated in Eightfinals by underdog Belgian side Standard Liège losing the two legs of the series in two weeks.

During June in Copa del Generalísimo the club advanced stages, in Quarterfinals defeated CF Barcelona 2–0 in Madrid and a controversial draw 1–1 in the second leg was suspended by referee Guruceta five minutes before the ending due to fans rioting on the field. Eventually the squad won the Final against Valencia CF at Estadio del CF Barcelona, with the national cup title serving as a consolation in the first campaign since 1952–53 where the club did not clinch a League title, neither a European Cup. Also, Amancio won the Pichichi Trophy scoring 16 goals tied along José Eulogio Gárate and Luis Aragonés.

== Squad ==
Note: Flags indicate national team as defined under FIFA eligibility rules; some limited exceptions apply. Players may hold more than one non-FIFA nationality.

No.	Pos.	Nation	Player
—	GK	(Spain) ESP	Andrés Junquera
—	DF	(Spain) ESP	Ignacio Zoco
—	DF	(Spain) ESP	Antonio Calpe
—	DF	(Spain) ESP	Pedro de Felipe
—	DF	(Spain) ESP	Goyo Benito
—	MF	(Spain) ESP	Manuel Velázquez
—	MF	(Spain) ESP	Pirri
—	FW	(Spain) ESP	Amancio Amaro
—	FW	(Spain) ESP	Ramón Grosso
—	FW	(Paraguay) PAR	Fleitas
—	FW	(Spain) ESP	Francisco Gento

No.	Pos.	Nation	Player
—	GK	(Spain) ESP	Antonio Betancort
—	DF	(Spain) ESP	Fernando Zunzunegui
—	DF	(Spain) ESP	Manuel Sanchís
—	FW	(Argentina) ARG	Miguel Pérez
—	DF	(Spain) ESP	Grande
—	GK	(Spain) ESP	Borja
—	FW	(Spain) ESP	Manuel Bueno
—	DF	(Spain) ESP	José Luis
—	FW	(Spain) ESP	Babiloni
—	DF	(Spain) ESP	Espíldora
—	GK	(Spain) ESP	Miguel Ángel
—	MF	(Spain) ESP	Planelles
—	DF	(Spain) ESP	Rafael de Diego
—	MF	(Spain) ESP	Vidal

=== Transfers ===
In
Pos.	Name	from	Type
DF	Goyo Benito	Rayo Vallecano	loan ended
FW	Sebastián Fleitas Miranda	CD Málaga	–
FW	Vidal	CE Sabadell CF	–
GK	José Luis Borja	Real Murcia	–
FW	Espíldora		–

Out
Pos.	Name	To	Type
FW	José Luis Veloso	Orense	–
DF	Vicente Miera	Real Gijón	–
MF	Félix Ruiz		–
MF	Chato González	Real Murcia	–
FW	Gerardo Ortega de Francisco	Calvo Sotelo	–

== Competitions ==
=== La Liga ===
==== Results by round ====
Round	1	2	3	4	5	6	7	8	9	10	11	12	13	14	15	16	17	18	19	20	21	22	23	24	25	26	27	28	29	30
Ground	A	H	H	A	H	A	H	A	H	A	H	A	H	A	H	H	A	A	H	A	H	A	H	A	H	A	H	A	H	A
Result	D	W	W	D	W	D	W	W	L	D	L	W	W	W	L	L	W	W	D	W	L	W	L	L	L	W	D	D	D	D
Position	8	3	1	1	1	1	1	1	3	3	4	3	3	2	3	3	3	3	3	3	3	3	3	3	6	4	4	5	5	6

Source: Competitive matches
A = Away; H = Home; W = Win; D = Draw; L = Loss; = Leader qualified to the 1970–71 European Cup; = Invited to the 1970–71 Inter-Cities Fairs Cup; = Relegated to the 1970–71 Segunda División

==== League table ====
Pos	Team	Pld	W	D	L	GF	GA	GD	Pts	Qualification or relegation
4	Barcelona	30	13	9	8	40	31	+9	35	Invited for the Inter-Cities Fairs Cup
5	Valencia	30	15	5	10	35	23	+12	35	Invited for the Inter-Cities Fairs Cup
6	Real Madrid	30	13	9	8	50	42	+8	35	Qualification for the Cup Winners' Cup first round (Note: Real Madrid qualified to the Cup Winners' Cup as champions of the Copa del Generalísimo.)
7	Real Sociedad	30	15	3	12	47	37	+10	33	
8	Zaragoza	30	13	7	10	35	39	−4	33	

Source: BDFútbol
Rules for classification: 1) Points; 2) Head-to-head results; 3) Goal difference; 4) Number of goals scored

==== Matches ====
15 September 1969 1	Real Madrid	3–3	CF Barcelona	Madrid
	Fleitas 18'; Fleitas 83 ' Gento 63'		3'Bustillo; 5' Bustillo; 71'Reshak	Stadium: Chamartín

21 September 1969 2	Elche CF	0–2	Real Madrid	Elche
		Report	Amaro 7' ′ Velazquez 13' ′	Stadium: Campo de Altabix

27 September 1969 3	UD Las Palmas	2–4	Real Madrid	Las Palmas de Gran Canaria
	Leon 5' ′ Gedesh 17' ′	Report	Grosso 39' ′ Velazquez 52'; Gento 80' (pen.) Amaro 89'	Stadium: Estadio Insular

6 October 1969 4	Real Madrid	2–2	Deportivo La Coruña	Madrid
	Grosso 68'; Fluteas 73' ′	Report	Sertukha 34' ′ Server 38' ′	Stadium: Chamartín

12 October 1969 5	Pontevedra CF	1–3	Real Madrid	Pontevedra
	Garcia 46'	Report	Amancio 23'; Amancio 34'; Amancio 37'	Stadium: Estadio Municipal de Pasarón

19 October 1969 6	Real Madrid	2–2	Atletico de Bilbao	Madrid
	Grosso 4'; Fluteas 36'	Report	Argotia 53'; Rojo 70'	Stadium: Chamartín

26 October 1969 7	Real Sociedad	1–2	Real Madrid	San Sebastián
	Urreisti 84'	Report	Grosso 1'; Fluteas 67'	Stadium: Atocha

2 November 1969 8	Real Madrid	1–0	CE Sabadell CF	Madrid
	Pirri 89'	Report		Stadium: Santiago Bernabeu

9 November 1969 9	Sevilla CF	1–0	Real Madrid	Sevilla
	Bergara 80'	Report		Stadium: Estadio Sanchez Pizjuan

15 November 1969 10	Real Madrid	1–1	Atlético Madrid	Madrid
	Fleitas 80'	Report	58' Adelardo	Stadium: Santiago Bernabeu

23 November 1969 11	Valencia CF	1–0	Real Madrid	Valencia
	Ansola 80'	Report		Stadium: Estadio Mestalla

29 November 1969 12	Real Madrid	3–1	Celta de Vigo	Madrid
	Velazquez 31'; Hernandez 85' (o.g.); De Diego 86'	Report	50' Jimenez	Stadium: Chamartín

18 December 1969 13	RCD Mallorca	1–2	Real Madrid	Mallorca
	Dominguez 68'	Report	9' Amancio; Perez 28'	Stadium: Estadio Lluis Sitjar

14 December 1969 14	Real Madrid	2–0	Granada CF	Madrid
	Amancio 19'; Amancio 23'	Report		Stadium: Santiago Bernabeu

21 December 1969 15	Real Zaragoza	2–0	Real Madrid	Zaragoza
	Villa 8'; Ocampos 49'	Report		Stadium: La Romareda

28 December 1970 16	CF Barcelona	1–0	Real Madrid	Barcelona
	Gallego 29'	Report		Stadium: Estadio del CF Barcelona

4 January 1970 17	Real Madrid	3–1	Elche CF	Madrid
	Amancio 46'; Amancio 63' (pen.); Grosso 59'	Report	45' Asensi	Stadium: Santiago Bernabeu

11 January 1970 18	Real Madrid	5–0	UD Las Palmas	Madrid
	Fleitas 5'; Fleitas 58'; Amancio 15'; Amancio 55'; Amancio 72' (pen.)	Report		Stadium: Santiago Bernabeu

18 January 1970 19	Deportivo La Coruña	1–1	Real Madrid	La Coruña
	Becky 5'	Report	66' Bueno	Stadium: Estadio Riazor

25 February 1970 20	Real Madrid	2–1	Pontevedra CF	Madrid
	Grosso 29'; Amancio 80' (pen.)	Report	36' Roldan	Stadium: Santiago Bernabeu

1 February 1970 21	Atletico de Bilbao	5–0	Real Madrid	Bilbao
	Uriarte 44'; Zubiaga 51'; Zubiaga 80'; Zubiaga 89'; Igartua 57'	Report		Stadium: San Mamés

15 February 1970 22	Real Madrid	3–0	Real Sociedad	Madrid
	Fleitas 12'; Gento 30' (pen.); Amancio 54 '	Report		Stadium: Chamartín; Referee: Angel Martinez

1 March 1970 23	CE Sabadell CF	3–0	Real Madrid	Sabadell
	Marañon 5'; Garzon 13'; Ortugno 75'	Report		Stadium: Campo Altabix

8 March 1970 24	Real Madrid	2–3	Sevilla CF	Madrid
	Amancio 22'; Pirri 87'	Report	1'Berrueto; 64' Blanquito; 77' Acosta	Stadium: Santiago Bernabeu

16 March 1970 25	Atlético Madrid	3–0	Real Madrid	Madrid
	Aragones 12'; Aragones 58'; Garate 76'	Report		Stadium: Manzanares; Referee: Daniel Isco

22 March 1970 26	Real Madrid	2–1	Valencia CF	Madrid
	Pirri 22'; Velazquez 73'	Report	Salt 30'	Stadium: Santiago Bernabeu

29 March 1970 27	Celta Vigo	2–2	Real Madrid	Vigo
	Juan 81'; Costas 83'	Report	Velazquez 6'; Fleitas 87'	Stadium: Estadio Balaídos; Referee: Jose Mendibil

5 April 1970 28	Real Madrid	1–1	Mallorca	Madrid
	Fleitas 42'	Report	Sanchez 33'	Stadium: Santiago Bernabeu

12 April 1970 29	Granada CF	0–0	Real Madrid	Granada
		Report		Stadium: Los Carmenes; Referee: Francisco Aguado

19 April 1970 30	Real Madrid	2–2	Real Zaragoza	Madrid
	Fleitas 50'; Velazquez 83'	Report	11' Planas; 55' Quiroz	Stadium: Santiago Bernabeu; Referee: Jaime Fortuny

=== Copa del Generalísimo ===
==== Round of 32 ====
4 May 1970	Castellon CF	2–2	Real Madrid	Castellón de la Plana
		Report

10 May 1970	Real Madrid	3–0 (5–2 agg.)	Castellón CF	Madrid
		Report		Stadium: Chamartín

==== Round of 16 ====
17 May 1970	UD Las Palmas	2–0	Real Madrid	Estadio Insular
		Report		Stadium: Las Palmas de Gran Canaria

24 May 1970	Real Madrid	4–1 (4–3 agg.)	UD Las Palmas	Madrid
		Report		Stadium: Chamartín

==== Quarter-finals ====
30 May 1970	Real Madrid	2–0	CF Barcelona	Madrid
	Grosso 5'; Amancio 44'	Report		Stadium: Chamartín

6 June 1970	CF Barcelona	1–1	Real Madrid	Barcelona
	Rexach 45'	Report	60' Amancio	Stadium: Estadio del CF Barcelona

==== Semi-finals ====
13 June 1970 1	Real Madrid	0–1	Atletico Bilbao	Madrid
		Report		Stadium: Santiago Bernabeu

20 June 1970 2	Atletico Bilbao	0–2	Real Madrid	Bilbao
		Report		Stadium: San Mamés

==== Final ====
28 June 1970	Real Madrid	3–1	Valencia	Barcelona
20:00 CET	Pirri 34' (pen.); Planelles 60'; Fleitas 65'	Report (in Spanish)	Jara 38' (pen.)	Stadium: Camp Nou, Attendance: 80,000; Referee: José María Ortiz de Mendíbil

=== European Cup ===
==== First round ====
24 September 1969	Olympiakos Nicosia (Cyprus)	0–8	(Spain) Real Madrid	Madrid
		Report	Amancio 5'; Gento 18'; Grosso 23', 55'; Fleitas 47', 52'; Grande 60'; Pirri 63'	Stadium: Santiago Bernabéu Stadium; Attendance: 18,419; Referee: (Romania) Aurel Bentu

30 September 1969	Real Madrid (Spain)	6–1	(Cyprus) Olympiakos Nicosia	Madrid
	De Diego 10', 74'; Planelles 20'; Grande 42'; Avraamidis 51' (o.g.); Fleitas 87'	Report	Kettenis 26'	Stadium: Santiago Bernabéu Stadium, Attendance: 14,420; Referee: (Romania) Corneliu Niţescu

==== Round of 16 ====
19 November 1969	Standard Liège (Belgium)	1–0	(Spain) Real Madrid	Liège
	Kostedde 42'	Report		Stadium: Stade Maurice Dufrasne, Attendance: 34,310; Referee: (England) Eric Jennings

3 December 1969	Real Madrid (Spain)	2–3	(Belgium) Standard Liège	Madrid
	Velázquez 20'; Gento 47' (pen.)	Report	Pilot 8'; Depireux 25'; Galić 69'	Stadium: Santiago Bernabéu Stadium, Attendance: 80,000; Referee: (Switzerland) Anton Bucheli

== Statistics ==
=== Players statistics ===
No.	Pos	Nat	Player	Total		Primera Division		Copa		European Cup	
No.	Pos	Nat	Player	Apps	Goals	Apps	Goals	Apps	Goals	Apps	Goals
	GK	(Spain) ESP	Junquera	20	-17	11+1	-10	6	-4	2	-3
	DF	(Spain) ESP	De Felipe	22	1	20	0	1	0	1	1
	DF	(Spain) ESP	Zoco	39	0	28	0	8	0	3	0
	DF	(Spain) ESP	Goyo Benito	31	0	17+3	0	8	0	3	0
	DF	(Spain) ESP	Calpe	26	0	21+2	0	1	0	2	0
	MF	(Spain) ESP	Pirri	38	6	26	3	9	2	3	1
	MF	(Spain) ESP	Grosso	40	8	28	6	9	1	3	1
	MF	(Spain) ESP	Velazquez	41	8	30	6	8	1	3	1
	FW	(Spain) ESP	Amancio	41	23	29	16	9	6	3	1
	FW	(Paraguay) PAR	Fleitas	35	17	25+1	12	4+2	2	3	3
	FW	(Spain) ESP	Gento	31	7	24	3	4	1	3	3
	GK	(Spain) ESP	Betancort	12	-13	9+1	-12	0	0	2	-1
	DF	(Spain) ESP	Zunzunegui	16	0	12+2	0	0	0	2	0
	DF	(Spain) ESP	Sanchis	23	0	12	0	8+1	0	2	0
	FW	(Argentina) ARG	Pérez	12	2	5+5	1	1+1	1	0	0
	DF	(Spain) ESP	Grande	17	2	6+3	0	3+3	0	1+1	2
	GK	(Spain) ESP	Borja	12	-19	9	-15	3	-4	0	0
	FW	(Spain) ESP	Bueno	13	1	6	1	3+3	0	1	0
	DF	(Spain) ESP	José Luis	19	1	3+4	0	8+1	1	1+2	0
	FW	(Spain) ESP	Babiloni	9	0	4+2	0	0	0	2+1	0
	DF	(Spain) ESP	Espíldora	6	0	4+1	0	0	0	1	0
	GK	(Spain) ESP	Miguel Ángel	3	-5	1+2	-5	0	0	0	0
	MF	(Spain) ESP	Planelles	4	2	0+2	0	0+1	1	1	1
	DF	(Spain) ESP	De Diego	3	3	0+1	1	0	0	2	2
	MF	(Spain) ESP	Vidal	1	0	0+1	0				
	FW	(Spain) ESP	Ortuño	4	1	0	0	4	1		
	DF	(Spain) ESP	Ballester	2	0	0	0	2	0		

- Source: http://www.bdfutbol.com/en/t/t1969–702.html

== See also ==
- Yé-yé (Real Madrid)
