= 1971–72 Real Madrid CF season =

69th season in existence of Real Madrid CF

Real Madrid CF
1971–72 season
- President: Santiago Bernabéu
- Head coach: Miguel Muñoz
- Stadium: Santiago Bernabéu
- La Liga: 1st (in European Cup)
- Copa del Generalísimo: Semi-finals
- UEFA Cup: Round of 16
- Top goalscorer: League: Pirri (11); All: Santillana (15)
Home colours	Away colours	Third colours

The 1971–72 season is Real Madrid Club de Fútbol's 69th season in existence and the club's 40th consecutive season in the top flight of Spanish football.

== Summary ==
During summer President Santiago Bernabéu transferred out several players such as Sanchis, Bueno, Planelles, Gento (retired), Betancort, Calpe, De La Fuente, Jimenez, Espíldora and Fermín. The club new arrivals were goalkeeper García Remón and a teenage 19-yrs-old forward Santillana in a sign of rejuvenate the squad and a reduced transfers budget for the upcoming years.

The club won its 15th League title two points above Defending Champions Valencia CF after a 0–0 draw of CF Barcelona against Córdoba CF at Los Carmenes one round before season finale. The team played the UEFA Cup for the first time and was early eliminated in Eightfinals by Dutch side PSV Eindhoven due to away goals. During June, the squad reached the 1971–72 Copa del Generalísimo semi-finals being defeated by Valencia CF lost 1–0 at Mestalla and a draw 0–0 in Madrid.

== Squad ==
Note: Flags indicate national team as defined under FIFA eligibility rules; some limited exceptions apply. Players may hold more than one non-FIFA nationality.

No.	Pos.	Nation	Player
—	GK	ESP	García Remón
—	DF	ESP	Verdugo
—	DF	ESP	Goyo Benito
—	DF	ESP	Ignacio Zoco
—	DF	ARG	Touriño
—	MF	ESP	Manuel Velázquez
—	MF	ESP	Pirri
—	FW	ESP	Santillana
—	FW	ESP	Ramón Grosso
—	FW	ESP	Aguilar
—	FW	ESP	Amancio Amaro

No.	Pos.	Nation	Player
—	GK	ESP	Miguel Ángel
—	MF	ESP	Grande
—	FW	ARG	Anzarda
—	DF	ESP	Pedro de Felipe
—	MF	ESP	González
—	GK	ESP	Andrés Junquera
—	FW	ESP	Rafael Marañón
—	FW	PAR	Fleitas
—	DF	ESP	Zunzunegui
—	MF	ESP	Ortuño
—	GK	ESP	Borja
—	DF	ESP	José Luis
—	FW	ARG	Miguel Pérez

=== Transfers ===
In
Pos.	Name	from	Type
GK	García Remón	Real Oviedo	loan ended
DF	Verdugo	Córdoba CF	–
FW	Santillana	Racing Santander	–
FW	Ico Aguilar	Racing Santander	–
FW	Anzarda	River Plate	–
MF	González	Racing Santander	–
GK	Corral	Racing Santander	–

Out
Pos.	Name	To	Type
DF	Sanchis	Córdoba CF	end of contract
FW	Manuel Bueno	Sevilla CF	end of contract
MF	Planelles	Castellón	–
MF	Francisco Gento	retired	end of contract
GK	Antonio Betancort	UD Las Palmas	end of contract
DF	Antonio Calpe		end of contract
DF	Luis María De La Fuente	Racing Santander	end of contract
FW	Jimenez	Xerez	–
DF	Espíldora	Racing Santander	–
MF	Fermín	Córdoba CF	–

== Competitions ==
=== La Liga ===
==== Position by round ====
Equipo / Jornada	1	2	3	4	5	6	7	8	9	10	11	12	13	14	15	16	17	18	19	20	21	22	23	24	25	26	27	28	29	30	31	32	33	34
Real Madrid	2	2	1	1	1	1	1	1	1	1	1	1	1	1	1	1	1	1	1	1	1	1	1	1	1	1	1	1	1	1	1	1	1	1

==== League table ====
Pos	Team	Pld	W	D	L	GF	GA	GD	Pts	Qualification or relegation
1	Real Madrid (C)	34	19	9	6	51	27	+24	47	Qualification for the European Cup first round
2	Valencia	34	19	7	8	53	30	+23	45	Qualification for the UEFA Cup first round
3	Barcelona	34	17	9	8	40	26	+14	43	Qualification for the UEFA Cup first round
4	Atlético Madrid	34	14	11	9	45	28	+17	39	Qualification for the Cup Winners' Cup first round (Note: Atlético Madrid qualified to the Cup Winners' Cup as champions of the Copa del Generalísimo.)
5	Las Palmas	34	15	8	11	40	36	+4	38	Qualification for the UEFA Cup first round

Source: BDFútbol
Rules for classification: 1) Points; 2) Head-to-head results; 3) Goal difference; 4) Number of goals scored
(C) Champions

==== Matches ====
5 September 1971 1	Real Madrid	2–0	Real Betis	Madrid
	Aguilar 25'; Amancio 32'	Report	(yellow card) Bizcocho	Stadium: Chamartín; Referee: Ricardo Coscolin

12 September 1971 2	Burgos	1–2	Real Madrid	Burgos
	Regejo 45'; Raul (yellow card); Astorga (yellow card)	Report	14' Anzarda; 76' Santillana	Stadium: El Plantio; Referee: Fortuny

19 September 1971 3	Real Madrid	3–0	Celta de Vigo	Madrid
	Anzarda 19'; Anzarda 44'; Zunzunegi 66'	Report	(yellow card) Lescano; (yellow card) Jimenez; (yellow card) Rivas	Stadium: Santiago Bernabeu; Referee: Bachero

26 September 1971 4	Córdoba CF	2–2	Real Madrid	Córdoba
	Manolin Cuesta 17'; Cruz Carrascosa 88'; Molina (yellow card); Rodri (red card) 58'; Torres (yellow card); Fermin (yellow card); Tejada (yellow card)	Report	41' Anzarda; 57' (pen.) Amancio; (yellow card) Santillana

3 October 1971 5	Real Madrid	2–0	CE Sabadell CF	Madrid
	Ico Aguilar 43'; Ico Aguilar 65'	Report		Stadium: Santiago Bernabeu; Referee: Segrelles del Pilar

10 October 1971 6	CD Málaga	1–1	Real Madrid	Málaga
	Pons 28'; Arias (yellow card); Viberti (yellow card)	Report	33' Amancio	Stadium: Estadio La Rosaleda; Referee: Orellana Alvarez

16 October 1971 7	Real Madrid	1–0	Atletico de Bilbao	Madrid
	Amancio 61'; Goyo Benito (yellow card)	Report	87' Iribar; (yellow card) Igartua	Stadium: Chamartín; Referee: Segrelles del Pilar

31 October 1971 8	Real Sociedad	0–2	Real Madrid	San Sebastián
		Report	19' Santillana; 77' Aguilar	Stadium: Atocha; Referee: Juan Elizondo

15 November 1971 9	Real Madrid	1–1	Valencia CF	Madrid
	Santillana 30'	Report	44' Quino; (yellow card) Vidajani	Stadium: Santiago Bernabeu; Referee: Fernando Tejerina

21 November 1971 10	Español	0–0	Real Madrid	Barcelona
		Report	(yellow card) Verdugo	Stadium: Sarria; Referee: Pedro Illordi

28 November 1971 11	Real Madrid	1–1	CF Barcelona	Madrid
	Grosso 6'	Report	68' Asensi	Stadium: Chamartín; Referee: Luis Diaz

4 December 1971 12	UD Las Palmas	2–0	Real Madrid	Las Palmas de Gran Canaria
	Gilberto 26'; Devora 77'	Report		Stadium: Estadio Insular; Referee: Juan Elizondo

12 December 1971 13	Real Madrid	4–2	Granada CF	Madrid
	Pirri 5'; Pirri 75' (pen.); Pirri 81'; Grosso 6'; Verdugo (yellow card); Amancio (red card) 32'	Report	(red card) 32' Fernandez; 83' Porta; 89' Suarez	Stadium: Santiago Bernabeu; Referee: Jose Paez

19 December 1971 14	Sporting Gijón	1–1	Real Madrid	Gijón
	Quini 54'; Alonso (yellow card)	Report	7' Pirri	Stadium: Estadio El Molinón; Referee: Pablo Ibañez

2 January 1972 15	Real Madrid	1–0	Deportivo La Coruña	Madrid
	Anzarda 45'	Report		Stadium: Chamartín; Referee: Jaime Fortuny

3 January 1972 16	Real Madrid	1–0	Atlético Madrid	Madrid
	Santillana 6'; Anzarda (yellow card); Goyo Benito (red card) 80'	Report	(yellow card) Iglesias	Stadium: Estadio Santiago Bernabéu; Referee: Mariano Iglesias

16 January 1972 17	Sevilla CF	0–2	Real Madrid	Sevilla
	Velazquez 5'; Anzarda 85'	Report		Stadium: Estadio Sanchez Pizjuan; Referee: Juan Elizondo

23 January 1972 18	Real Betis	0–0	Real Madrid	Sevilla
	Bizcocho (yellow card)	Report		Stadium: Estadio Benito Villamarín; Referee: Vicente Balchero

30 January 1972 19	Real Madrid	1–1	Burgos	Madrid
	Amancio 55' (pen.)	Report	80' Aguirre; (yellow card) Angelin	Stadium: Chamartín; Referee: Pedro Illordi

6 February 1972 20	Celta Vigo	1–1	Real Madrid	Vigo
	Vilela 67'; Jimenez (yellow card)	Report	80' Pirri	Stadium: Estadio Balaídos; Referee: Pablo Ibañez

13 February 1972 21	Real Madrid	4–1	Córdoba CF	Madrid
	Velazquez 14'; Pirri 47'; Santillana 55'; Santillana 73'	Report	4' Ortega; (yellow card) Alarcon	Stadium: Santiago Bernabeu; Referee: Jose Paez

20 February 1972 22	CE Sabadell CF	1–2	Real Madrid	Sabadell
	Cristo 48'	Report	30' (pen.) Pirri; 42' Ico Aguilar	Stadium: Estadio Cruz Alta; Referee: Alvarez

27 February 1972 23	Real Madrid	1–0	CD Málaga	Madrid
	Velazquez 38'	Report		Stadium: Chamartín; Referee: Alvarez

5 March 1972 24	Atletico de Bilbao	1–0	Real Madrid	Bilbao
	Uriarte 13'	Report		Stadium: San Mamés; Referee: Muro

12 March 1972 25	Real Madrid	2–1	Real Sociedad	Madrid
	Pirri 1'; Santillana 6' (yellow card)	Report	22' Boronat; (yellow card) Oyarsabal	Stadium: Santiago Bernabeu; Referee: Elordi

21 March 1972 26	Valencia CF	1–2	Real Madrid	Valencia
	Anton 68'	Report	48' Grosso; 80' Oyarzabal	Stadium: Estadio Mestalla; Referee: Ibanez

26 March 1972 27	Real Madrid	3–0	Español	Madrid
	Santillana 3'; Velazquez 26'; Grande 61'	Report		Stadium: Chamartín; Referee: Alvarez

3 April 1972 28	CF Barcelona	1–0	Real Madrid	Barcelona
	Asensi 11'	Report		Stadium: Estadio del CF Barcelona; Referee: Sancristobal

9 April 1972 29	Real Madrid	2–0	UD Las Palmas	Madrid
	Pirri 83'; Santillana 88'	Report		Stadium: Chamartín; Referee: Mendibil

16 April 1972 30	Granada CF	2–1	Real Madrid	Granada
	Fernandez 16'; Porta 46'; Frances (yellow card)	Report	25' Marañon	Stadium: Los Carmenes; Referee: Alvarez

23 April 1972 31	Real Madrid	1–0	Sporting Gijón	Madrid
	Grande 29'	Report	(yellow card) Alonso; (yellow card) Fabian	Stadium: Santiago Bernabeu; Referee: Bachero

30 April 1972 32	Deportivo La Coruña	1–0	Real Madrid	La Coruña
	Llorca 71'	Report		Stadium: Estadio Riazor

7 May 1972 33	Atlético Madrid	4–1	Real Madrid	Madrid
	Alberto 18'; Adelardo 20'; José Eulogio Gárate 53'; Grosso 85' (own goal)	Report	Velázquez 31'	Stadium: Estadio Vicente Calderón; Referee: Sanchez Rios

14 May 1972 34	Real Madrid	4–1	Sevilla CF	Madrid
	Amancio 17'; Santillana 24'; Pirri 66'; Pirri 71'	Report	86' Acosta	Stadium: Santiago Bernabeu; Referee: Juan Elizondo

=== Copa del Generalísimo ===
==== Eightfinals ====
4 June 1972	San Andrés	1–1	Real Madrid	San Andrés
		Report

10 June 1972	Real Madrid	5–1 (6–2 agg.)	San Andrés	Madrid
		Report		Stadium: Chamartín

==== Quarter-finals ====
17 June 1972	Real Madrid	3–0	Español	Madrid
		Report		Stadium: Chamartín

25 June 1972	Español	3–1	Real Madrid	Barcelona
		Report		Stadium: Estadio Sarria

==== Semi-finalSS ====
29 June 1972	Valencia CF	1–0	Real Madrid	Valencia
		Report		Stadium: Estadio Mestalla

2 July 1972	Real Madrid	0–0	Valencia CF	Madrid
		Report		Stadium: Chamartín

=== UEFA Cup ===
15 September 1971	Basel (Switzerland)	1–2	(Spain) Real Madrid	St. Jakob Stadium, Basel
20:00	Hasler 32'	Report	Aguilar 33'; Santillana 75'	Referee: Ken Burns (England)

29 September 1971	Real Madrid (Spain)	2–1	(Switzerland) Basel	Santiago Bernabéu Stadium
21:00	Aguilar 48'; Santillana 78'	Report	Siegenthaler 57'	Referee: Aurelio Angonese (Italy)

==== Eightfinals ====
20 October 1971	Real Madrid (Spain)	3–1	(Netherlands) PSV Eindhoven	Madrid
		Report		Stadium: Chamartín

3 November 1971	PSV Eindhoven (Netherlands)	2–0 (3a-3 agg.)	(Spain) Real Madrid	Eindhoven
		Report		Stadium: Philips Stadion

== Statistics ==
=== Players statistics ===
No.	Pos	Nat	Player	Total		Primera Division		Copa		UEFA	
No.	Pos	Nat	Player	Apps	Goals	Apps	Goals	Apps	Goals	Apps	Goals
	GK	(Spain) ESP	García Remón	39	-35	29	-24	6	-6	4	-5
	DF	(Spain) ESP	Verdugo	44	0	34	0	6	0	4	0
	DF	(Spain) ESP	Goyo Benito	42	0	34	0	4	0	4	0
	DF	(Spain) ESP	Zoco	36	0	29	0	3	0	4	0
	DF	(Argentina) ARG	Touriño	36	0	28	0	6	0	2	0
	MF	(Spain) ESP	Pirri	30	14	19+4	11	5	3	0+2	0
	MF	(Spain) ESP	Grosso	39	3	32	3	3	0	4	0
	MF	(Spain) ESP	Velazquez	42	5	32	5	6	0	4	0
	FW	(Spain) ESP	Amancio	37	7	28	6	6	0	3	1
	FW	(Spain) ESP	Santillana	44	15	34	10	6	3	4	2
	FW	(Spain) ESP	Ico Aguilar	38	10	28+3	6	0+3	1	4	3
	GK	(Spain) ESP	Miguel Ángel	6	-3	5+1	-3				
	MF	(Spain) ESP	Grande	32	2	10+14	2	3+2	0	1+2	0
	FW	(Argentina) ARG	Anzarda	20	7	16	6	0	0	4	1
	DF	(Spain) ESP	De Felipe	17	0	5+6	0	5	0	0+1	0
	MF	(Spain) ESP	González	13	0	3+7	0	1+2	0		
	GK	(Spain) ESP	Junquera	0	0	0	0				
	FW	(Spain) ESP	Marañon	14	3	3+5	1	6	2		
	FW	(Paraguay) PAR	Fleitas	8	0	0+7	0	0	0	0+1	0
	DF	(Spain) ESP	Zunzunegui	4	1	2	1	0	0	2	0
	MF	(Spain) ESP	Ortuño	2	0	1+1	0				
	GK	(Spain) ESP	Borja	0	0	0	0				
	DF	(Spain) ESP	José Luis	0	0	0	0				
	FW	(Argentina) ARG	Miguel Pérez	0	0	0	0				

- Source: http://www.bdfutbol.com/en/t/t1971-722.html
