= 1971 European Cup Winners' Cup final =

- Match programme cover
- Event: 1970–71 European Cup Winners' Cup
Chelsea	Real Madrid
(England)	(Spain)
- Chelsea won after a replay

Final
Chelsea	Real Madrid
1	1
- After extra time
- Date: 19 May 1971
- Venue: Karaiskakis Stadium, Piraeus
- Referee: Rudolf Scheurer (Switzerland)
- Attendance: 42,000

Replay
Chelsea	Real Madrid
2	1
- Date: 21 May 1971
- Venue: Karaiskakis Stadium, Piraeus
- Referee: Anton Bucheli (Switzerland)
- Attendance: 19,917

The 1971 European Cup Winners' Cup Final was a football match contested by Chelsea of England and Real Madrid of Spain. It was the final match of the 1970–71 competition and the 11th European Cup Winners' Cup final in all.

== Route to the final ==
(England) Chelsea					(Spain) Real Madrid			
Opponent	Agg.	1st leg	2nd leg		Opponent	Agg.	1st leg	2nd leg
(Greece) Aris	6–2	1–1 (A)	5–1 (H)	First round	(Malta) Hibernians	5–0	0–0 (A)	5–0 (H)
(Bulgaria) CSKA Sofia	2–0	1–0 (A)	1–0 (H)	Second round	(Austria) Wacker Innsbruck	2–1	0–1 (H)	2–0 (A)
(Belgium) Club Brugge	4–2	0–2 (A)	4–0 (a.e.t.) (H)	Quarter-finals	(Wales) Cardiff City	2–1	0–1 (A)	2–0 (H)
(England) Manchester City	2–0	1–0 (H)	1–0 (A)	Semi-finals	(Netherlands) PSV	2–1	0–0 (A)	2–1 (H)

== Match review ==
The Spanish club were challenging for their seventh European trophy overall (all six previous were European Cups), a record among European clubs at the time, while the West Londoners were seeking their first ever European honour. The final took place on 19 May 1971 and was staged at Karaiskakis Stadium in Piraeus, Greece, which was filled to capacity by traveling fans of both clubs as well as local football aficionados. Chelsea went ahead with a Peter Osgood left-foot volley from inside the area, after a Boyle-Cooke combination, but Real, demonstrating their "exceptional ball skills", pressed back and eventually equalised in the last minute with Ignacio Zoco. There were no further goals scored in extra time, so the final went to a replay game.

The replay was staged at the same venue two days later, on a Friday, with markedly lower attendance. Most of the clubs' fans had left, having booked return tickets on the assumption that, as usual, the final would be decided in one game, although a number of Chelsea's followers stayed on, "sleeping in the rough" around the city. Chelsea scored two goals with Peter Osgood and John Dempsey in the first half. Real's Sebastián Fleitas scored 15 minutes before the end of the game but Chelsea hung on to win 2–1 and become the third London club to win the trophy.

== Match ==
=== Details ===
19 May 1971

Chelsea (England)	1–1 (a.e.t.)	(Spain) Real Madrid
Osgood 56'	Report	Zoco 90'

Karaiskakis Stadium, Piraeus
Attendance: 42,000
Referee: Rudolf Scheurer (Switzerland)

Chelsea	Real Madrid

GK	1	(England) Peter Bonetti
DF	2	(Scotland) John Boyle
DF	3	(England) Ron Harris (c)
MF	4	(England) John Hollins	(substituted off) 91'
DF	5	(Republic of Ireland) John Dempsey
DF	6	(England) David Webb
W	7	(England) Keith Weller
MF	8	(England) Alan Hudson
ST	9	(England) Peter Osgood	(substituted off) 86'
MF	10	(Scotland) Charlie Cooke
W	11	(England) Peter Houseman
Substitutes:
DF	14	(Republic of Ireland) Paddy Mulligan	(substituted on) 91'
ST	15	(England) Tommy Baldwin	(substituted on) 86'
Manager:
(England) Dave Sexton

GK	1	(Spain) José Luis Borja
DF	2	(Spain) José Luis
DF	3	(Spain) Goyo Benito
DF	4	(Spain) Ignacio Zoco
MF	5	(Spain) Pirri
DF	6	(Spain) Fernando Zunzunegui
MF	7	(Spain) Ramón Grosso
MF	8	(Spain) Manuel Velázquez
MF	9	(Argentina) Miguel Pérez	(substituted off) 65'
FW	10	(Spain) Amancio Amaro
FW	11	(Spain) Paco Gento (c)	(substituted off) 70'
Substitutes:
MF	12	(Paraguay) Sebastián Fleitas	(substituted on) 65'
FW	13	(Spain) Toni Grande	(substituted on) 70'
Manager:
(Spain) Miguel Muñoz

=== Replay ===
21 May 1971

Chelsea (England)	2–1	(Spain) Real Madrid
Dempsey 33'; Osgood 39'	Report	Fleitas 75'

Karaiskakis Stadium, Piraeus
Attendance: 19,917
Referee: Anton Bucheli (Switzerland)

Chelsea	Real Madrid

GK	1	(England) Peter Bonetti
RB	2	(Scotland) John Boyle
CB	6	(England) David Webb
CB	5	(Republic of Ireland) John Dempsey
LB	3	(England) Ron Harris (c)
CM	4	(Scotland) Charlie Cooke
CM	10	(England) Alan Hudson
RW	7	(England) Keith Weller
LW	11	(England) Peter Houseman
CF	8	(England) Tommy Baldwin
CF	9	(England) Peter Osgood	(substituted off) 73'
Substitutes:
DF	14	(Republic of Ireland) Paddy Mulligan
CF	15	(South Africa) Derek Smethurst	(substituted on) 73'
Manager:
(England) Dave Sexton

GK	1	(Spain) José Luis Borja
RB	2	(Spain) José Luis
SW	6	(Spain) Ignacio Zoco (c)
CB	5	(Spain) Goyo Benito
LB	3	(Spain) Fernando Zunzunegui
CM	10	(Spain) Manuel Velázquez	(substituted off) 75'
DM	4	(Spain) Pirri
CM	9	(Spain) Ramón Grosso
RW	7	(Paraguay) Sebastián Fleitas
CF	8	(Spain) Amancio Amaro
LW	11	(Spain) Manuel Bueno	(substituted off) 60'
Substitutes:
DM	15	(Spain) Toni Grande	(substituted on) 60'
LW	16	(Spain) Paco Gento	(substituted on) 75'
Manager:
(Spain) Miguel Muñoz

== See also ==
- 1971 European Cup Final
- 1971 Inter-Cities Fairs Cup Final
- 1998 UEFA Super Cup – contested between same teams
- Chelsea F.C. in international football competitions
- Real Madrid CF in international football competitions
