= Amancio (footballer) =

Spanish footballer (1939–2023)

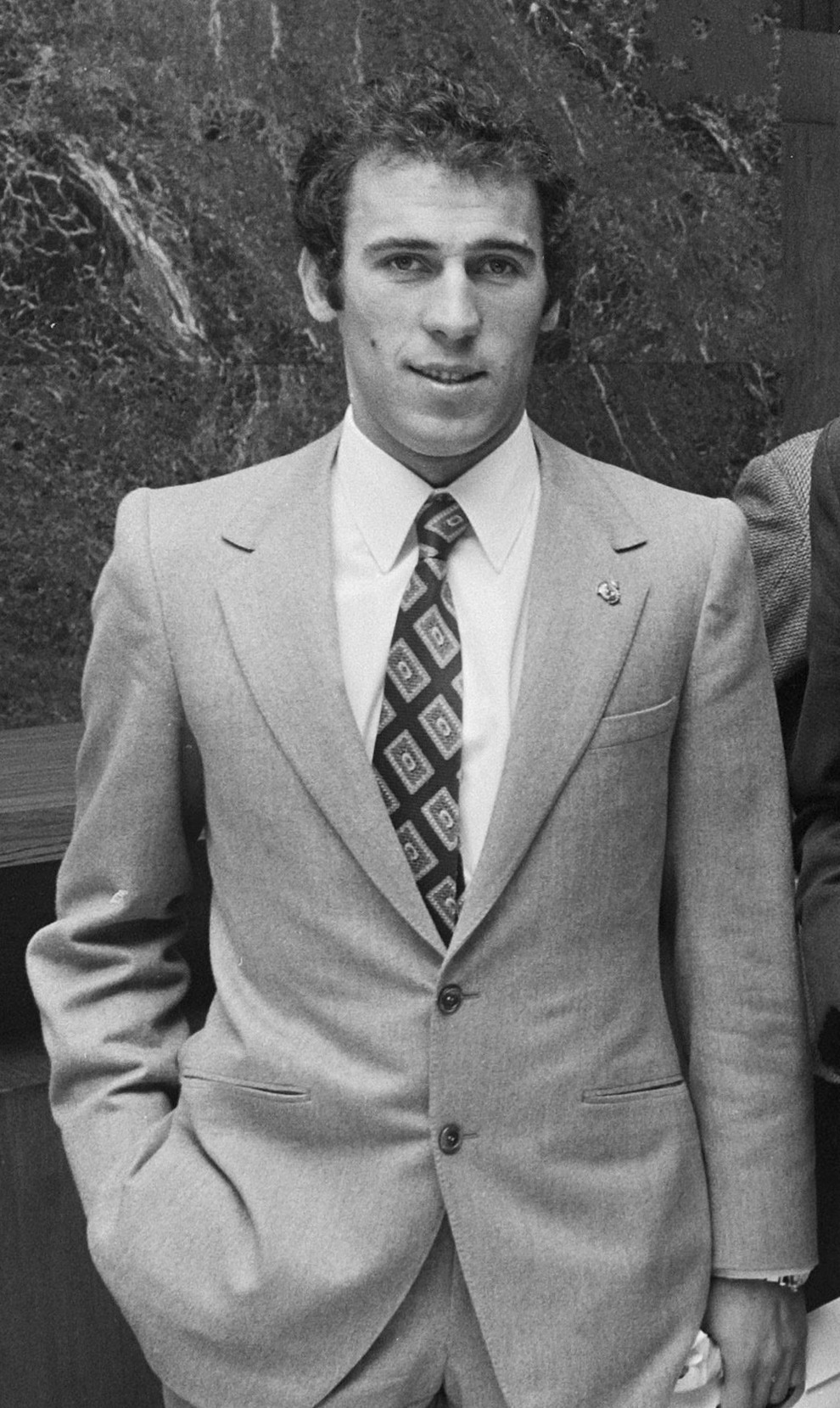
- Amancio in 1971

Personal information
- Full name: Amancio Amaro Varela
- Date of birth: 16 October 1939
- Place of birth: A Coruña, Spain
- Date of death: 21 February 2023 (aged 83)
- Place of death: Madrid, Spain
- Height: 1.76 m (5 ft 9 in)
- Position: Outside right

Youth career
- 1954–1958: Victoria

Senior career*
Years	Team	Apps	(Gls)
1958–1962	Deportivo La Coruña	92	(54)
1962–1976	Real Madrid	344	(119)
Total		436	(173)

International career
1962–1974	Spain	42	(11)

Managerial career
- 1976–1977: Real Madrid (youth)
- 1982–1984: Castilla
- 1984–1985: Real Madrid
Medal record
Representing Spain
European Nations' Cup
Winner	1964 Spain
- * Club domestic league appearances and goals

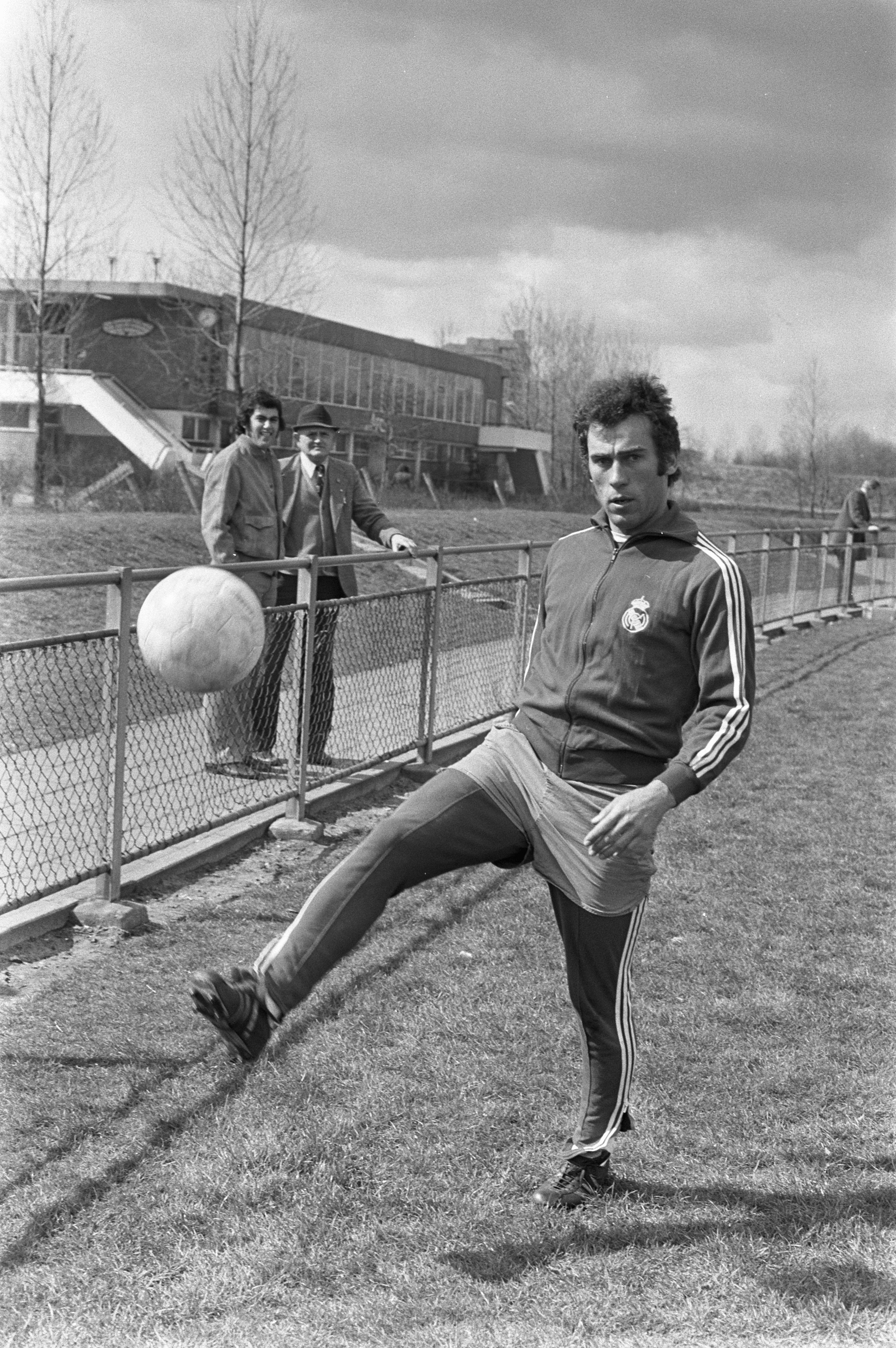
Amancio in 1973

Amancio Amaro Varela (16 October 1939 – 21 February 2023), commonly known simply as Amancio, was a Spanish football player. Nicknamed El Brujo (The Wizard) he played outside right for Deportivo de La Coruña, Real Madrid, and the Spain national team.

== Club career ==
=== Early career ===
Amancio began his career aged 15 at local side Victoria, in the district of Falperra–Santa Lucía. In the 1958–59 season, he joined Deportivo de La Coruña, which at that time was in the Spanish second division. When Deportivo were promoted to first division, Amancio started to attract the attention of the scouts for major teams, such as Real Madrid.

=== Real Madrid ===
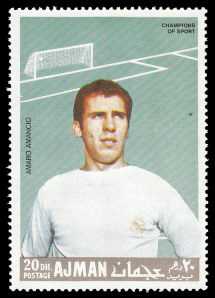
Amancio depicted on a 1968 Ajman stamp

The signing of Amancio by Real Madrid almost did not happen; had it not been for Santiago Bernabéu’s insistence in signing the player, his astronomical signing-fee would have spoiled the negotiations.

Along with the signing of Amancio by Real Madrid in June 1962, players such as Ignacio Zoco, Lucien Muller and Yanko Daucik also arrived. During this time the team was in a transitional phase, since in earlier years the team had swept the competition both in Spain and outside its borders. Amancio made his debut in European competition opposite Anderlecht (3–3 result in the Santiago Bernabéu); and in the league against Real Betis in Seville with a 5–2 win for Real Madrid.

During the 1963–64 season, Amancio and Real Madrid reached the final of the European Cup, only to be beaten by Inter Milan by 3–1. The following season brought more heartache, with Benfica eliminating the youthful Madrid side in the quarterfinals. The ensuing season brought success for Madrid, as Miguel Muñoz added young players such as Pirri, Velázquez, Sanchís and Grosso. This was known as the "Yé-Yé" team. Strong at the back, and devastating going forward, Madrid fought their way to another final, this time against Partizan. The venue was Heysel Stadium in Brussels, and on 11 May 1966, Amancio stepped out on to the pitch for his second and last European Cup final. Partizan's Velibor Vasović scored the first goal of the match. Amancio drew level twenty minutes from the end, after collecting a signature pass, faking out a defender and skillfully booting the ball past the Yugoslav keeper Milutin Šoškić. Five minutes later, a thunderous shot by teammate Serena from 30 metres out settled the game. It was Amancio's first and only European Cup winner's medal. In his first six seasons in Madrid, he won a six La Liga titles. He would then go on to win another three. He also took the title of Pichichi on back to back occasions, 1969 and 1970.

As a Real Madrid player, Amancio's reputation reached such international fame, that he had the honour of being called for a world team, promoted by FIFA.

Amancio retired in 1976 and joined the coaching staff of Real Madrid. After the death of Francisco "Paco" Gento, he was appointed the honorary president of the club in 2022.

== International career ==
Amancio wore the Spain national team's jersey on 42 occasions, debuting before Romania. With the team, he was a participant of one of its greatest achievements: winning the 1964 European Football Championship by a 2–1 score against the defending champions, the Soviet Union.

== Managerial career ==
Upon retiring, Amancio began coaching the junior teams of Real Madrid. After one season, he decided to dedicate himself to his businesses. In 1982, he was readmitted by Luis de Carlos, who had just won the club's presidential elections.

Amancio once again took charge of Castilla, with which he won the Segunda División in his second season. The team included the legendary Quinta del Buitre, made up of Butragueño, Míchel, Sanchis, Martín Vázquez and Pardeza.

In the 1984–85 season, Amancio took charge of the first team. However, the outcome was not as good as expected, and he left his post. After a time as a consultant, Amancio left Real Madrid to join the sports company Kelme, becoming a representative responsible for the Madrid area.

In July 2000, Amancio was elected as a member of the board of directors of Real Madrid. From this position, he favored the incorporation of former Real players in different positions of responsibility of the club. The board of directors agreed that Amancio would be in charge of the 100th anniversary of Real Madrid.

In 2022, he was appointed to the position of the honorary president of the club.

== Death ==
Amancio died in Madrid on 21 February 2023, at the age of 83.

== Career statistics ==
=== Club ===
Appearances and goals by club, season and competition
Club	Season	League			Copa del Generalísimo		Europe (Note: All appearances in European Cup, unless otherwise noted)		Other		Total	
Club	Season	Division	Apps	Goals	Apps	Goals	Apps	Goals	Apps	Goals	Apps	Goals
Deportivo de La Coruña	1958–59	Segunda División	11	3	6	4	—		—		17	7
Deportivo de La Coruña	1959–60	Segunda División	26	10	4	5	—		—		30	15
Deportivo de La Coruña	1960–61	Segunda División	29	16	4	4	—		—		33	20
Deportivo de La Coruña	1961–62	Segunda División	26	25	2	2	—		—		28	27
Deportivo de La Coruña	Total		92	54	16	15	—		—		108	69
Real Madrid	1962–63	La Liga	28	14	8	1	2	0	—		38	15
Real Madrid	1963–64	La Liga	24	6	3	1	8	3	—		35	10
Real Madrid	1964–65	La Liga	22	9	0	0	5	6	—		27	15
Real Madrid	1965–66	La Liga	25	8	2	0	7	5	—		34	13
Real Madrid	1966–67	La Liga	25	7	5	0	4	0	2 (Note: Appearance(s) in Intercontinental Cup)	0	36	7
Real Madrid	1967–68	La Liga	28	10	8	4	7	4	—		43	18
Real Madrid	1968–69	La Liga	29	14	1	0	2	1	—		32	15
Real Madrid	1969–70	La Liga	29	16	9	6	3	1	—		41	23
Real Madrid	1970–71	La Liga	19	6	2	0	9 (Note: Appearance(s) in European Cup Winners' Cup)	0	—		30	6
Real Madrid	1971–72	La Liga	28	6	6	0	3 (Note: Appearance(s) in UEFA Cup)	1	—		37	7
Real Madrid	1972–73	La Liga	25	8	2	0	7	1	—		34	9
Real Madrid	1973–74	La Liga	26	8	3	0	1	0	—		30	8
Real Madrid	1974–75	La Liga	17	3	7	1	2	0	—		26	4
Real Madrid	1975–76	La Liga	19	4	2	0	7	0	—		28	4
Real Madrid	Total		344	119	58	13	67	22	2	0	471	154
Career total			436	173	74	28	67	22	2	0	579	223

=== International ===
Appearances and goals by national team and year
National team	Year	Apps	Goals
Spain	1962	1	0
Spain	1963	3	1
Spain	1964	4	3
Spain	1966	3	1
Spain	1967	4	0
Spain	1968	6	3
Spain	1969	5	2
Spain	1970	4	0
Spain	1971	6	0
Spain	1972	3	1
Spain	1973	2	0
Spain	1974	1	0
Total		42	11

Scores and results list Spain's goal tally first, score column indicates score after each Amancio goal.

List of international goals scored by Amancio
No.	Date	Venue	Opponent	Score	Result	Competition
1	30 May 1963	San Mamés, Bilbao, Spain	Northern Ireland	1–0	1–1	1964 European Nations' Cup qualifying
2	11 March 1964	Sánchez Pizjuán, Seville, Spain	Republic of Ireland	1–0	5–1	1964 European Nations' Cup qualifying
3	11 March 1964	Sánchez Pizjuán, Seville, Spain	Republic of Ireland	3–1	5–1	1964 European Nations' Cup qualifying
4	17 June 1964	Santiago Bernabéu, Madrid, Spain	Hungary	2–1	2–1	1964 European Nations' Cup
5	15 July 1966	Hillsborough, Sheffield, England	Switzerland	2–1	2–1	1966 FIFA World Cup
6	28 February 1968	Sánchez Pizjuán, Seville, Spain	Sweden	1–0	2–0	Friendly
7	28 February 1968	Sánchez Pizjuán, Seville, Spain	Sweden	2–0	2–0	Friendly
8	8 May 1968	Santiago Bernabéu, Madrid, Spain	England	1–0	1–2	UEFA Euro 1968 qualifying
9	30 April 1969	Camp Nou, Barcelona, Spain	Yugoslavia	2–0	2–2	1970 FIFA World Cup qualification
10	15 October 1969	José Antonio, La Línea, Spain	Finland	5–0	6–0	1970 World Cup qualification
11	19 October 1972	Insular, Las Palmas, Spain	Yugoslavia	1–0	2–2	1974 FIFA World Cup qualification

== Honours ==
=== Player ===
Deportivo

- Segunda División: 1961–62

Real Madrid

- La Liga: 1962–63, 1963–64, 1964–65, 1966–67, 1967–68, 1968–69, 1971–72, 1974–75, 1975–76
- Copa del Generalísimo: 1969–70, 1973–74, 1974–75
- European Cup: 1965–66

Spain

- UEFA European Football Championship: 1964

Individual

- Pichichi: 1968–69, 1969–70
- Pichichi Second Division: 1961–62
- Ballon d'Or third place: 1964
- UEFA European Championship Team of the Tournament: 1964
- FUWO European Team of the Year: 1965
- FIFA XI: 1968

=== Manager ===
Castilla

- Segunda División: 1983–84

Sporting positions
Preceded by Zoco	Real Madrid CF captain 1974–1976	Succeeded by Pirri
