= Yé-yé (Real Madrid) =

The Yé-yé team was the name given to the generation of all-Spanish Real Madrid players that dominated Spanish football in the 1960s and won the European Cup in 1966. The team was captained by the veteran player Francisco Gento who won the European Cup six times. He would lead a group of younger players that included José Araquistáin, Pachín, Pedro de Felipe, Manuel Sanchís, Pirri, Ignacio Zoco, Fernando Serena, Amancio Amaro, Ramón Grosso and Manuel Velázquez. This group of younger players sometimes were considered to be hippies because they wore longer hair than the previous generation. The name "Yé-yé" came from the "Yeah, yeah, yeah" chorus in The Beatles' song "She Loves You" after four members of the team posed for Marca impersonating the Beatles. "Yé-yé" was also how youngsters were called in Spain in the sixties when Beatlemania was catching on around the world, as well as a musical style popular in Spain in that decade.

The transformation of the team began in 1959 when Miguel Muñoz became the coach of Real Madrid. As a player, he captained Real Madrid as they won the European Cup in 1956 and 1957. The team he played with was built with the best foreign talents Real Madrid could acquire. The team he built as the head coach of Real Madrid was composed of Spanish players entirely. They dominated La Liga, winning the competition nine times, including a five in a row sequence. They also won the European Cup in 1966 at Brussels' Heysel Stadium by coming from behind to beat Partizan Belgrade 2–1.
