= Miguel Pérez (footballer, born 1980) =

Spanish footballer

Personal information
- Full name: Miguel Alfonso Pérez Aracil
- Date of birth: 28 May 1980 (age 46)
- Place of birth: Madrid, Spain
- Height: 1.80 m (5 ft 11 in)
- Position: Midfielder

Senior career*
Years	Team	Apps	(Gls)
2000	Onda		
2001	Burriana	17	(1)
2001–2002	Getafe	24	(3)
2002–2005	Numancia	86	(6)
2005–2006	Gimnàstic	7	(0)
2006–2008	Alavés	19	(1)
2008–2011	Levante	47	(2)
Total		200	(13)
- * Club domestic league appearances and goals

Miguel Alfonso Pérez Aracil (Spanish pronunciation: [miˈɣel alˈfonso ˈpeɾeθ]; born 28 May 1980) is a Spanish retired footballer who played as a midfielder.

== Club career ==
Pérez was born in Madrid. During his career, spent mostly in the second division, he represented CD Onda (Villarreal CF's farm team), Getafe CF, CD Numancia (appearing in 19 games in 2004–05's La Liga), Gimnàstic de Tarragona, Deportivo Alavés and Levante UD. He made his debut in the Spanish top flight on 28 August 2004, coming on as a first-half substitute to help Numancia to a 1–1 home draw against Real Betis.

Pérez contributed 18 matches – only two complete, 842 minutes, no goals – in the 2009–10 season, as Levante returned to the top division after two years. Aged 30, he was released in the 2011 January transfer window, without no official appearances whatsoever in the first half of the campaign.

== Personal life ==
Pérez's younger brother, Alejandro, was also a footballer. He played in Real Madrid's youth academy, and both represented Catalonia' Gimnàstic in 2005–06.

Their father, Miguel Ángel, was also involved in the sport. Born in Argentina, he settled in Spain after retiring, having played in the country for Real Madrid and Real Zaragoza amongst other clubs.
