= Álex Pérez (footballer, born 1985) =

Spanish footballer

Personal information
- Full name: Alejandro Pérez Aracil
- Date of birth: 21 January 1985 (age 41)
- Place of birth: Madrid, Spain
- Height: 1.84 m (6 ft 0 in)
- Position: Midfielder

Senior career*
Years	Team	Apps	(Gls)
2002–2003	Real Madrid C		
2003–2006	Real Madrid B	48	(2)
2004	Real Madrid	0	(0)
2005–2006	→ Gimnàstic (loan)	0	(0)
2007	Aris	4	(0)
2007–2009	Albacete	22	(1)
2011	Ontinyent	8	(0)
Total		82	(3)

International career
2001	Spain U17	1	(1)
2003	Spain U18	3	(0)
- * Club domestic league appearances and goals

Alejandro 'Álex' Pérez Aracil (born 21 January 1985) is a Spanish former footballer who played as a midfielder.

== Club career ==
Pérez was born in Madrid. An unsuccessful youth graduate at local Real Madrid, his input with the first team consisted of one minute against Terrassa FC in the round of 16 of the Copa del Rey, on 8 January 2003. Subsequently, he signed with Gimnàstic de Tarragona on loan, but featured in no second division matches for the Catalans in his sole campaign.

In January 2007, Pérez was released by Real, going on to serve an unassuming stint abroad with Greece's Aris Thessaloniki FC. In that summer he returned home, joining Albacete Balompié of the second tier.

After two seasons with only relative playing time in his second – 15 games, one goal– Pérez was released. He played with lowly Ontinyent CF for four months, then retired in June 2011 at only 26.

== Personal life ==
Pérez's older brother, Miguel, was also a footballer. Both played in Gimnàstic in 2005–06.

Their father, Miguel Ángel, was also involved in the sport. Born in Argentina, he settled in Spain after retiring, having played in the country for Real Madrid and Real Zaragoza amongst other clubs.
