= Juan Carlos Touriño =

Footballer (1944–2017)

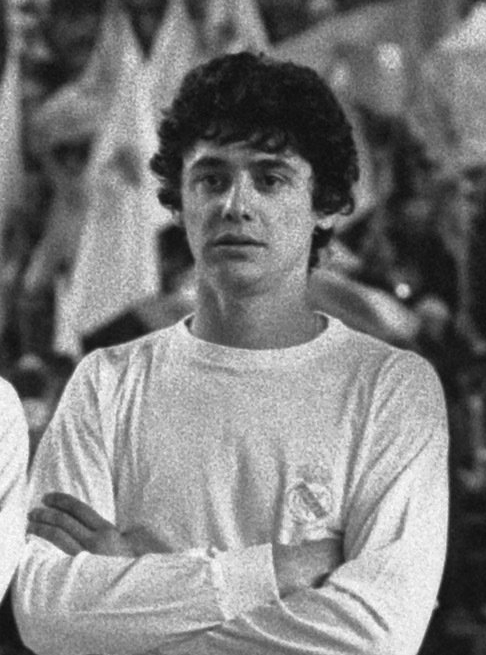
- Touriño in 1973

Personal information
- Full name: Juan Carlos Touriño Cancela
- Date of birth: 14 July 1944
- Place of birth: Buenos Aires, Argentina
- Date of death: 7 March 2017 (aged 72)
- Place of death: Buenos Aires, Argentina
- Position: Defender

Youth career
- Villa Modelo
- Dock Sud
- River Plate
- Arsenal de Sarandí
- Quilmes

Senior career*
Years	Team	Apps	(Gls)
1966–1970	Quilmes	112	(1)
1970–1976	Real Madrid	106	(0)
1977	Independiente Medellín	17	(1)
1977	Quilmes		
1978	Gimnasia	42	(1)
- San Lorenzo
- Chacarita Juniors

International career
1972	Spain	1	(0)

Managerial career
- 1983–1984: Palencia
- 1984–1985: Recreativo
- * Club domestic league appearances and goals

Juan Carlos Touriño Cancela (14 July 1944 – 7 March 2017) was a professional footballer who played as a defender. After starting his career in Argentina, he won two La Liga titles and two Spanish Cups with Real Madrid, and made one appearance for the Spain national team.

== Early life ==
Touriño was born in the Parque Patricios district of Buenos Aires, Argentina, to immigrant Spanish parents who had fled the Spanish Civil War. As a youngster, he supported local team Huracán but did not begin playing football until the age of 15 as his parents would not allow him to have a football. He began playing for Villa Modelo in Gerli in 1959, joined the Dock Sud youth team in 1962 and also played youth football for River Plate, Arsenal de Sarandí and Quilmes.

== Club career ==
Touriño made his professional debut aged 22 in 1966 for Quilmes in the Argentine Primera División. He went on to make over 100 appearances for the club. In 1968, he participated in a tour of Africa with Racing Club de Avellaneda under manager Juan José Pizzuti which utilised a number of players from other Argentine teams. He continued to play for Quilmes until 1970 when he was signed by Real Madrid CF of Spain. Signed by manager Miguel Muñoz, Touriño played over 100 league games for Real Madrid between 1970 and 1976, during which time he was part of three La Liga championship and two Spanish cup winning squads.

Early in his Real Madrid spell, he was part of the squad that reached the 1971 European Cup Winners' Cup Final which they lost to Chelsea F.C. In 1971–72, he won his first league championship with the club. He broke his tibia and fibula in 1973, and during his recuperation began suffering from depression and considered retiring from football but was convinced to carry on playing by the Real Madrid staff.

Following his recovery, he returned to the team and won consecutive league and cup doubles with the club in 1973–74 and 1974–75. After the retirement of Miguel Muñoz in 1974 he played under manager Miljan Miljanić until his return to South America to play for Independiente Medellín of Colombia in 1977. In 1977, he returned to Argentina to play for Quilmes again. In 1978, he joined Gimnasia y Esgrima de La Plata missing out on Quilmes' only ever professional league title in Metropolitano 1978. He played out his career in the lower leagues with San Lorenzo de Mar del Plata and Chacarita Juniors.

== International career ==
Touriño made his only international appearance on 12 January 1972 in Spain's 1–0 victory over Hungary.

== Style of play ==
Touriño originally wanted to play as a midfielder and spent much of his youth career playing on the right wing but he eventually became a defender and was a strong man-to-man marker.

== Managerial career ==
Touriño worked as the manager of Gimnasia y Esgrima de La Plata in Argentina and then returned to Spain where he worked as the manager of Segunda División sides Recreativo de Huelva and Palencia CF.

== Later and personal life ==
Touriño went on to become involved in the Argentine Players Union (Futbolistas Argentinos Agremiados) holding a number of different roles within the organisation including secretary general and treasurer. He has worked within the organisation to promote the idea that access to football facilities could help prevent young people from becoming addicted to drugs.

He was also involved with the Civil Association of former Quilmes Atlético Club footballers and lectured on football management at the Facultad de Psciología at the University of Buenos Aires. In February 2008, he returned to Real Madrid to unveil a plaque in honour of fellow Argentine footballer Alfredo Di Stéfano.

Touriño was a keen reader and writer of poetry and said that it was his dream that some day someone would set one of his poems to music. He also said that his professional ambition was to ensure that all footballers were prepared for life after their football career came to an end.

Touriño had five children, one born in Spain, one in Colombia and three born in Argentina. He died at a hospital in Buenos Aires on the night of 7 March 2017 from pancreatic disease, aged 72.

== See also ==
- List of Spain international footballers born outside Spain
