= Pascual Babiloni =

Spanish footballer (1946–2023)

Personal information
- Full name: Jesús Pascual Babiloni Soler
- Date of birth: 13 November 1946
- Place of birth: Castellón, Spain
- Date of death: 22 February 2023 (aged 76)
- Height: 1.78 m (5 ft 10 in)
- Position: Left-back

Youth career
- 1961–1965: Castellón

Senior career*
Years	Team	Apps	(Gls)
1965–1968	Castellón	75	(0)
1968–1970	Real Madrid	8	(0)
1970–1977	Castellón	220	(2)
1977–1978	Benicarló		
1978–1981	Vall de Uxó		
- * Club domestic league appearances and goals

Jesús Pascual Babiloni Soler (13 November 1946 – 22 February 2023) was a Spanish footballer who played as a left-back.

Babiloni died on 22 February 2023, at the age of 76.

== Honours ==
Real Madrid

- La Liga: 1968–69
- Copa del Generalísimo: 1969–70

Castellón

- Tercera División: 1964–65, 1965–66
- Copa del Generalísimo: Runner-up 1972–73

Vall de Uxó

- Tercera División: 1978–79
