= Juan Planelles =

Spanish footballer

Personal information
- Full name: Juan Bautista Planelles Marco
- Date of birth: 26 January 1951 (age 75)
- Place of birth: Burriana, Spain
- Height: 1.78 m (5 ft 10 in)
- Position: Midfielder

Youth career
- 1966–1967: Burriana
- 1967–1969: Real Madrid

Senior career*
Years	Team	Apps	(Gls)
1969–1974	Real Madrid	19	(1)
1971–1973	→ Castellón (loan)	53	(15)
1974–1976	Valencia	50	(12)
1976–1978	Zaragoza	24	(2)
1978–1983	Castellón	119	(24)
1983–1984	Burriana		
Total		265	(54)

International career
1968–1969	Spain U18	5	(2)
1970–1974	Spain amateur	7	(1)
1973	Spain	2	(0)
- * Club domestic league appearances and goals

Juan Bautista Planelles Marco (born 26 January 1951 in Burriana, Valencian Community) is a Spanish retired footballer who played as a midfielder.

== Honours ==
Real Madrid

- Copa del Generalísimo: 1969–70
- UEFA Cup Winners' Cup runner-up: 1970–71

Castellón

- Segunda División: 1980–81
- Copa del Generalísimo runner-up: 1972–73
