= Marañón (footballer) =

Spanish footballer (born 1948)

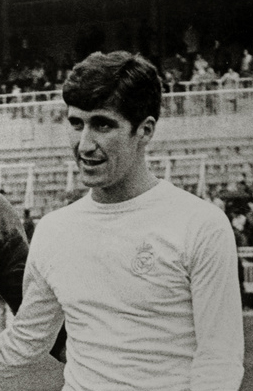
- Marañón in 1970

Personal information
- Full name: Rafael Carlos Pérez González
- Date of birth: 23 July 1948 (age 78)
- Place of birth: Olite, Spain
- Height: 1.74 m (5 ft 9 in)
- Position: Striker

Youth career
- 1966–1967: Oberena
- 1967–1968: Real Madrid

Senior career*
Years	Team	Apps	(Gls)
1968–1974	Real Madrid	47	(5)
1968–1969	→ Ontinyent (loan)	27	(15)
1969–1970	→ Sporting Gijón (loan)	31	(16)
1974–1983	Español	261	(110)
1983–1985	Sabadell	67	(19)
Total		433	(165)

International career
1977–1978	Spain	4	(0)
- * Club domestic league appearances and goals

Rafael Carlos Pérez González (born 23 July 1948), known as Marañón, is a Spanish former professional footballer who played as a striker.

Even though he started out at Real Madrid, his career was mainly associated with Español. Over the course of 13 seasons, he amassed La Liga totals of 308 games and 115 goals.

Marañón appeared with Spain at the 1978 World Cup.

== Club career ==
Born in Olite, Navarre, Marañón arrived in the Real Madrid youth system at the age of 19, making his professional debut with Ontinyent CF in the Segunda División, on loan (a similar move occurred in the following season with Sporting de Gijón). He joined Real's first team permanently in 1970, but never imposed himself at the club during his four-year spell, appearing in a maximum of 19 La Liga games in the 1973–74 campaign.

Marañón's sporting fate changed in summer 1974, as he signed with RCD Español. After two slow seasons, he would never score in single digits again, also playing European competition with the Catalan side, being awarded captaincy and reaching the national team.

Marañón retired in 1985 at the age of 37, seeing out his career at neighbouring CE Sabadell FC and helping them to promote to the second tier in his debut campaign. He was Español's top scorer in the main division with a total of 111 goals; his record would stand for 24 years until another club legend, Raúl Tamudo, broke it on 9 June 2007 in a 2–2 away draw against FC Barcelona.

== International career ==
Capping off his best season at Español – 22 goals, good enough for joint-second behind Valencia CF's Mario Kempes, as the team nearly qualified for Europe– Marañón made his debut for Spain, appearing in a 1–1 friendly with Hungary in Alicante on 27 March 1977. Subsequently, he was included in the 1978 FIFA World Cup squad but did not play in the finals, earning four caps in one year.

== Post-retirement ==
While still a player at Sabadell, Marañón majored in architecture. He later obtained his PhD by writing a thesis on Rafael Masó i Valentí, and served as an advisor during the construction of Espanyol's sports city.

== Honours ==
Sporting Gijón

- Segunda División: 1969–70

Real Madrid

- La Liga: 1971–72
- Copa del Generalísimo: 1973–74

Sabadell

- Segunda División B: 1983–84
