= Pirri =

Spanish footballer (born 1945)

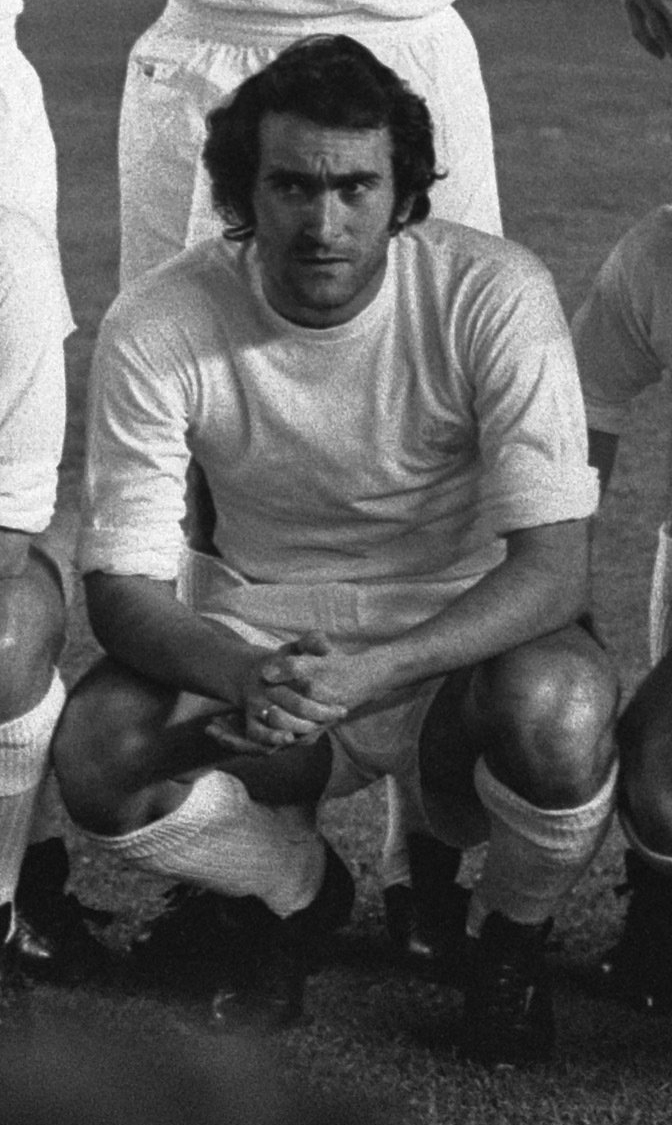
- Pirri with Real Madrid in 1973

Personal information
- Full name: José Martínez Sánchez
- Date of birth: 11 March 1945 (age 81)
- Place of birth: Ceuta, Spain
- Height: 1.74 m (5 ft 9 in)
- Positions: Central midfielder; sweeper

Youth career
- Imperio Riffien
- SD Ceuta
- Atlético Ceuta

Senior career*
| Years | Team | Apps | (Gls) |
| 1963–1964 | Granada | 21 | (12) |
| 1964–1980 | Real Madrid | 417 | (123) |
| 1980–1982 | Puebla | 55 | (18) |
| Total | | 493 | (153) |

International career
| 1963 | Spain U18 | 1 | (0) |
| 1964 | Spain amateur | 4 | (2) |
| 1966–1978 | Spain | 41 | (16) |
- * Club domestic league appearances and goals

José Martínez Sánchez (born 11 March 1945), nicknamed Pirri, is a Spanish former professional footballer. A central midfielder in the early part of his career, he finished it as a sweeper.

He spent the vast majority of his career with Real Madrid, appearing in 561 competitive matches and scoring 172 goals while winning 15 titles. He also served as captain of the club.

A Spain international for 12 years, Pirri represented the country in two World Cups.

== Club career ==
Born in Ceuta, Pirri signed for Real Madrid in 1964 as a 19-year-old, from Segunda División club Granada who received 200 million pesetas. He made his debut with the former on 8 November of that year as a replacement for the suspended Ferenc Puskás, in a 4–1 home win against Barcelona. He scored the first of his 123 goals in La Liga later that month, contributing to a 2–0 home victory over Deportivo de La Coruña also at the Santiago Bernabéu Stadium.

During his tenure at Real, Pirri won ten national championships, netting in double digits in five of those seasons including a career-best 13 goals in 1975–76. He added nine appearances in the 1965–66 European Cup (for a total of 57 with 18 goals in the competition), including the final against Partizan (2–1 win in Brussels); he was part of a generation of players of the team dubbed Yé-Yé.

In 1980, Pirri joined Mexican Liga MX side Puebla. He scored his first goal for them on 28 September, in a 2–0 home defeat of Atletas Campesinos.

Pirri retired from the game at the age of 37 due his club's poor economic situation, even though he had one year more running in his contract. He then completed his studies to qualify as a physician, and joined Real Madrid's medical staff; in late December 1999, he was named their general manager after Jorge Valdano (who later replaced him) rejected the offer.

On 17 July 2023, Pirri was appointed as honorary president of Real Madrid.

== International career ==
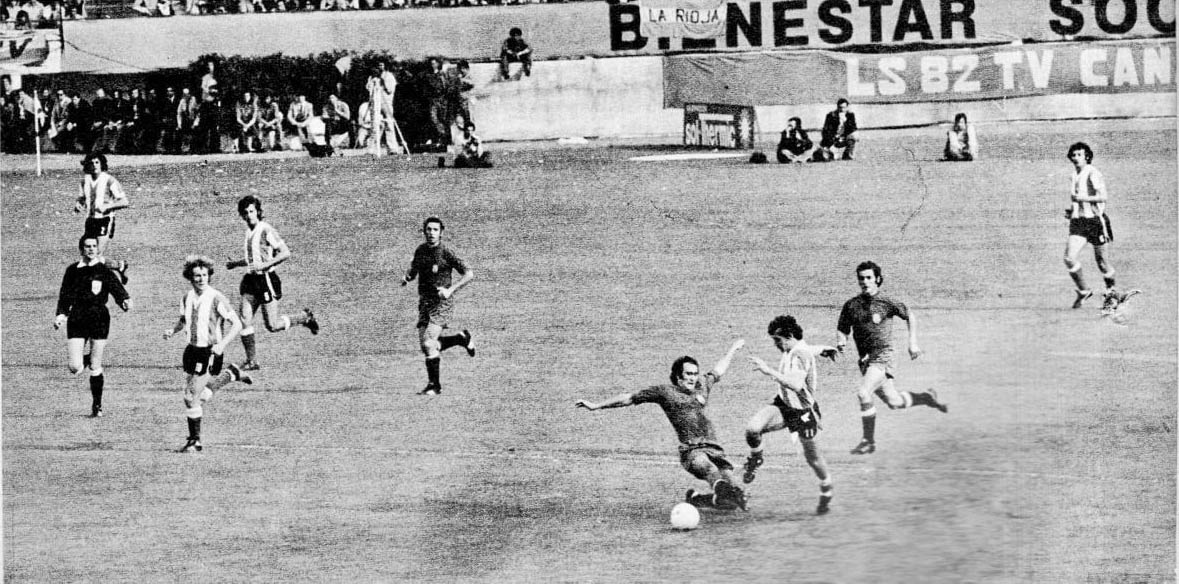
Pirri tackles Argentina's Enzo Ferrero during a 1974 friendly

Pirri earned 41 caps for Spain, scoring 16 goals. He made his debut in their 1966 FIFA World Cup opener, netting in the 2–1 loss to Argentina in an eventual group-stage exit.

The 33-year-old was also in squad for the 1978 World Cup held in Argentina, playing twice in another group phase elimination.

=== International goals ===
Scores and results list Spain's goal tally first, score column indicates score after each Pirri goal.

List of international goals scored by Pirri
| No. | Date | Venue | Opponent | Score | Result | Competition |
|---|---|---|---|---|---|---|
| 1 | 13 July 1966 | Villa Park, Birmingham, England | Argentina | 1–1 | 1–2 | 1966 FIFA World Cup |
| 2 | 7 December 1966 | Mestalla, Valencia, Spain | Republic of Ireland | 2–0 | 2–0 | Euro 1968 qualifying |
| 3 | 22 October 1967 | Santiago Bernabéu, Madrid, Spain | Czechoslovakia | 1–0 | 2–1 | Euro 1968 qualifying |
| 4 | 17 October 1968 | Gerland, Lyon, France | France | 1–1 | 1–3 | Friendly |
| 5 | 15 October 1969 | José Antonio, La Línea, Spain | Finland | 1–0 | 6–0 | 1970 World Cup qualification |
| 6 | 11 November 1970 | Sánchez Pizjuán, Seville, Spain | Northern Ireland | 2–0 | 3–0 | Euro 1972 qualifying |
| 7 | 20 February 1971 | Sant'Elia, Cagliari, Italy | Italy | 1–0 | 2–1 | Friendly |
| 8 | 17 March 1971 | Luis Casanova, Valencia, Spain | France | 1–2 | 2–2 | Friendly |
| 9 | 17 March 1971 | Luis Casanova, Valencia, Spain | France | 2–2 | 2–2 | Friendly |
| 10 | 9 May 1971 | GSP, Nicosia, Cyprus | Cyprus | 1–0 | 2–0 | Euro 1972 qualifying |
| 11 | 24 November 1971 | Los Cármenes, Granada, Spain | Cyprus | 1–0 | 7–0 | Euro 1972 qualifying |
| 12 | 24 November 1971 | Los Cármenes, Granada, Spain | Cyprus | 4–0 | 7–0 | Euro 1972 qualifying |
| 13 | 12 October 1974 | Monumental, Buenos Aires, Argentina | Argentina | 1–0 | 1–1 | Friendly |
| 14 | 12 October 1975 | Sarrià, Barcelona, Spain | Denmark | 1–0 | 2–0 | Euro 1976 qualifying |
| 15 | 10 October 1976 | Sánchez Pizjuán, Seville, Spain | Yugoslavia | 1–0 | 1–0 | 1978 World Cup qualification |
| 16 | 25 January 1978 | Santiago Bernabéu, Madrid, Spain | Italy | 1–0 | 2–1 | Friendly |

== Style of play ==
Pirri was well known for his ferocity, leadership skills and versatility. Other than his two main positions, he was also deployed as a makeshift forward.

Pirri played the 1971 European Cup Winners' Cup final with his arm in a cast, and the decisive game of the 1974 Copa del Rey with fever and a broken clavicle. For his services to Real Madrid, he was only one of two players to have the Laureada being bestowed upon him by president Santiago Bernabéu – the other being Goyo Benito.

== Personal life ==
In 1969, Pirri married Spanish actress Sonia Bruno. In February 2009, he started working as a commentator for Radio Nacional de España's Tablero Deportivo.

== Honours ==
Real Madrid

- La Liga: 1964–65, 1966–67, 1967–68, 1968–69, 1971–72, 1974–75, 1975–76, 1977–78, 1978–79, 1979–80
- Copa del Rey: 1969–70, 1973–74, 1974–75, 1979–80
- European Cup: 1965–66

Individual

- La Liga Team of The Year: 1975–76, 1977–78, 1979–80
- UEFA Jubilee Poll (2004): #99

== See also ==
- List of La Liga players (400+ appearances)
- List of Real Madrid CF records and statistics
