= Miguel Pérez (footballer, born 1947) =

Argentine-born Spanish footballer

Personal information
- Full name: Miguel Ángel Pérez Pilipiux
- Date of birth: 10 April 1947 (age 79)
- Place of birth: Buenos Aires, Argentina
- Position: Forward

Youth career
- 1962–1964: Racing Club
- 1964–1965: Deportivo Italiano

Senior career*
Years	Team	Apps	(Gls)
1965–1966	Deportivo Italiano	48	(17)
1966–1972	Real Madrid	53	(10)
1967	→ Monaco (loan)		
1972–1973	Zaragoza	6	(0)
1973–1974	Rayo Vallecano	6	(0)
1975–1976	Castellón	6	(1)
1976–1977	Alcorcón		
Total		119	(28)

International career
1971	Spain U23	1	(0)
- * Club domestic league appearances and goals

Miguel Ángel Pérez Pilipiux (born 10 April 1947) is a Spanish former professional footballer who played as a forward.

== Club career ==
Pérez was born in Buenos Aires, Argentina, and began his professional career in 1965 with Deportivo Italiano, in the second division. The following year he moved abroad, signing with La Liga powerhouse Real Madrid who also briefly loaned him to AS Monaco FC in France.

Pérez was used mainly as a backup during his six-year spell at the Santiago Bernabéu Stadium, but contributed to the conquest of two leagues and one Copa del Rey. His best individual season at the club was 1970–71 as he scored four goals in 20 games (19 starts), but Real came out empty in silverware, finishing the league in fourth position.

Also in the country, Pérez played one year in the top division for Real Zaragoza, then took his game to the Spanish lower leagues – appearing for three teams in as many seasons – before retiring in 1977 at the age of 30.

== International career ==
Pérez played one match for the Spain under-23 side, a 0–1 loss against France on 18 March 1971.

== Personal life ==
Pérez settled in Spain after his retirement, fathering two sons, Miguel and Alejandro, both of whom went on to represent several teams, almost always in the second division.

== Honours ==
Real Madrid

- La Liga: 1967–68, 1968–69
- Copa del Generalísimo: 1969–70
