= Sebastián Fleitas =

Paraguayan footballer (1947-2000)

Personal information
- Full name: Sebastián Fleitas Miranda
- Date of birth: 25 February 1947
- Place of birth: Asunción, Paraguay
- Date of death: 14 April 2000 (aged 53)
- Place of death: Madrid, Spain
- Position: Striker

Senior career*
Years	Team	Apps	(Gls)
1964–1968	Club Libertad		
1968–1969	Málaga	29	(13)
1969–1972	Real Madrid	58	(18)
1972–1973	Nîmes	17	(4)
1973–1974	Sevilla		
1974–1976	Marbella		

International career
1966–1968	Paraguay	3	(1)
- * Club domestic league appearances and goals

Sebastián Fleitas Miranda (22 February 1947 – 14 April 2000) was a footballer from Paraguay who played as a striker.

== Club career ==
Born in Asunción, Fleitas started his career at Club Libertad of Paraguay, making his debut at the age of 17 and quickly earning the nickname babygol. In 1967, he was the top scorer of the Paraguayan League, coming to the attention of Spanish side CD Málaga, who eventually signed Fleitas in 1968. A good first season at Málaga was enough to attract the interest of Real Madrid, who signed him in 1969. At Real Madrid, Fleitas won the Copa del Rey in the 1969–70 season and one Spanish League title in 1971–72. He was the scorer of Real's only goal in the 1971 European Cup Winners' Cup Final replay game in Piraeus, Greece, won 2–1 by Chelsea.

After retiring in 1976, Fleitas worked in football in various capacities, ending up as a scout for Real Madrid.

== International career ==
Fleitas played three times for the Paraguay national team, all of them in friendlies scoring once.

== Personal life ==
Fleitas was married to the daughter of Spanish actor Fernando Rey and living in Madrid, where he died prematurely, at age 53, while alone in his apartment, from what appeared to be a stroke. Real's former manager Vicente del Bosque characterized Fleitas as "a man beloved by everyone who lived around the club".

== Honours ==
Real Madrid

- La Liga: 1971–72
- Copa del Rey: 1969–70

Individual

- Paraguayan League top scorer in 1967
