= Pedro de Felipe =

Spanish footballer

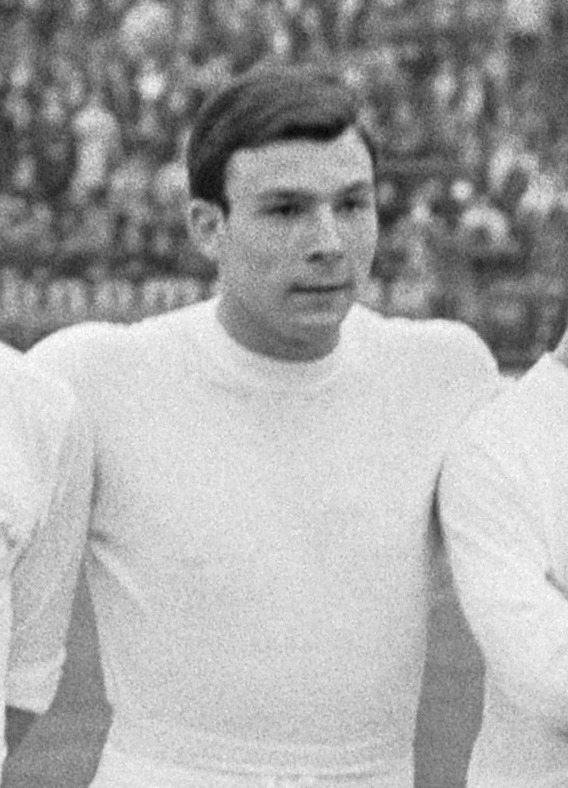
- De Felipe in 1966

Personal information
- Full name: Pedro Eugenio de Felipe Cortés
- Date of birth: 18 July 1944
- Place of birth: Madrid, Spain
- Date of death: 12 April 2016 (aged 71)
- Place of death: Madrid, Spain
- Height: 1.78 m (5 ft 10 in)
- Position: Centre-back

Youth career
- Real Madrid

Senior career*
Years	Team	Apps	(Gls)
1962–1972	Real Madrid	126	(0)
1962–1964	→ Rayo Vallecano (loan)		
1972–1978	Espanyol	121	(0)
Total		247	(0)

International career
1964	Spain amateur	1	(0)
1973	Spain	1	(0)
- * Club domestic league appearances and goals

Pedro Eugenio de Felipe Cortés (18 July 1944 – 12 April 2016) was a Spanish footballer who played as a central defender.

== Club career ==
Born in Madrid, de Felipe returned to Real Madrid in 1964 at the age of 20 following a loan to Community of Madrid neighbours Rayo Vallecano. He appeared in only four La Liga games in his first season but totalled 45 the following two, winning the 1965–66 European Cup in the process while contributing seven complete matches.

On 28 September 1967, after playing three games with a damaged meniscus, de Felipe successfully underwent surgery, being out of action for several months. He still managed to be regularly used during two of his last four years at the Santiago Bernabéu Stadium, leaving the club in 1972 and spending a further six top-flight campaigns with RCD Español, retiring at 34.

A tough tackler – sometimes to excess– de Felipe severely injured FC Barcelona's Miguel Ángel Bustillo on 14 September 1969, in a 3–3 home draw. The scorer of two early goals, Bustillo was able to take part in just three league matches for the Camp Nou-based side in as many seasons.

== International career ==
De Felipe earned one cap for Spain, playing the full 90 minutes in a 0–0 friendly draw with Turkey on 17 October 1973, in Istanbul.

== Death ==
De Felipe died on 12 April 2016 in Madrid, due to cancer. He was 71 years old.

== Honours ==
Real Madrid

- La Liga: 1964–65, 1966–67, 1967–68, 1968–69, 1971–72
- Copa del Generalísimo: 1969–70; runner-up: 1967–68
- European Cup: 1965–66
