= Manuel Sanchís =

Spanish footballer

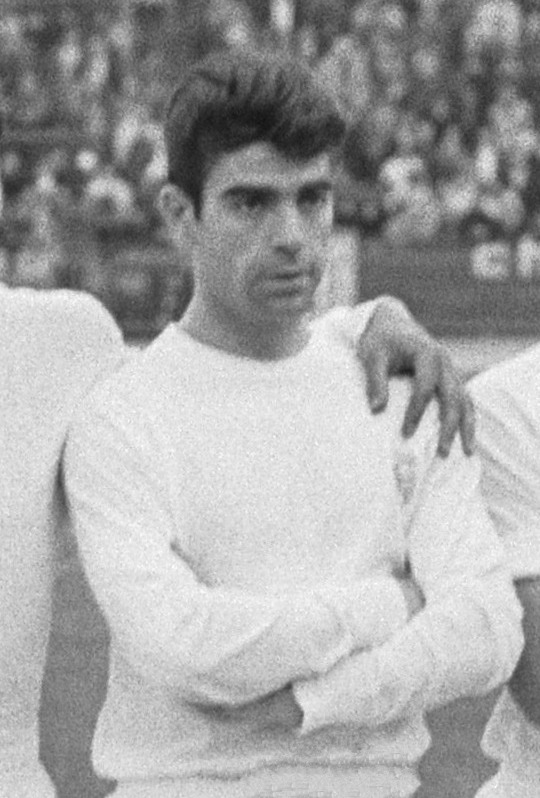
- Sanchís in 1966

Personal information
- Full name: Manuel Sanchís Martínez
- Date of birth: 26 March 1938
- Place of birth: Alberic, Spain
- Date of death: 28 October 2017 (aged 79)
- Place of death: Madrid, Spain
- Height: 1.71 m (5 ft 7 in)
- Position: Defender

Senior career*
Years	Team	Apps	(Gls)
1955–1961	Condal	113	(7)
1961–1964	Valladolid	87	(3)
1965–1971	Real Madrid	143	(1)
1971–1972	Córdoba	14	(0)
Total		357	(11)

International career
1965–1967	Spain	11	(1)

Managerial career
- 1974–1976: Castilla
- 1977–1978: Tenerife
- 1980: Equatorial Guinea
- 1982–1983: Torrejón
- 1984–1986: Parla
- 1987: Daimiel
- 1988–1989: Don Benito
- 1991–1992: Alzira
- * Club domestic league appearances and goals

Manuel Sanchís Martínez (26 March 1938 – 28 October 2017) was a Spanish football defender and manager.

Like his son, Manolo Sanchís, he represented Real Madrid and Spain. They were one of only four father/son pairs to have won the European Cup/Champions League (the others being Cesare and Paolo Maldini, Carles and Sergio Busquets and Zinedine and Luca Zidane), and he played 213 La Liga matches over ten seasons.

An international for two years, Sanchís appeared with the national team at the 1966 World Cup.

== Playing career ==
Sanchís was born in Alberic, Valencia. During his career, he represented CD Condal, Real Valladolid, Real Madrid and Córdoba CF, and he was a member of the successful Madrid sides in the mid-60s that won four La Liga championships in five years, with the addition of the 1965–66 edition of the European Cup (in this competition, he appeared 35 times for the club).

Sanchís earned 11 caps for Spain, and represented the nation at the 1966 FIFA World Cup. In the group stage of that tournament, he scored in a 2–1 win against Switzerland.

=== International goals ===
Scores and results list. Spain's goal tally first.

#	Date	Venue	Opponent	Score	Result	Competition
1.	15 July 1966	Hillsborough Stadium, Sheffield, England	Switzerland	1–1	2–1	1966 FIFA World Cup

== Style of play ==
An offensive-minded defender who was deployed as a forward earlier in his career, Sanchís was known for his exceptional physical qualities, including his strength as well as his class and skills.

== Coaching career ==
After retiring, Sanchís started working as a manager. After beginning with Real Madrid Castilla, he was also in charge of CD Tenerife in the Segunda División before being appointed at the Equatorial Guinea national team.

As the nation was immersed in a situation that would lead to the coup d'état against Francisco Macías Nguema, the sporting facilities in the country suffered from a deep lack of investment, and Sanchís eventually left his post and returned to his country. He subsequently was in charge of lowly AD Torrejón, AD Parla, Daimiel CF, CD Don Benito and UD Alzira, mainly in the Community of Madrid.

== Death ==
Sanchís died on 28 October 2017 in Madrid at the age of 79, from pulmonary embolism.

== Honours ==
Real Madrid

- La Liga: 1964–65, 1966–67, 1967–68, 1968–69
- Copa del Generalísimo: 1969–70
- European Cup: 1965–66

Individual

- FUWO European Team of the Season: 1966
