= Toni Grande =

Spanish football player/manager

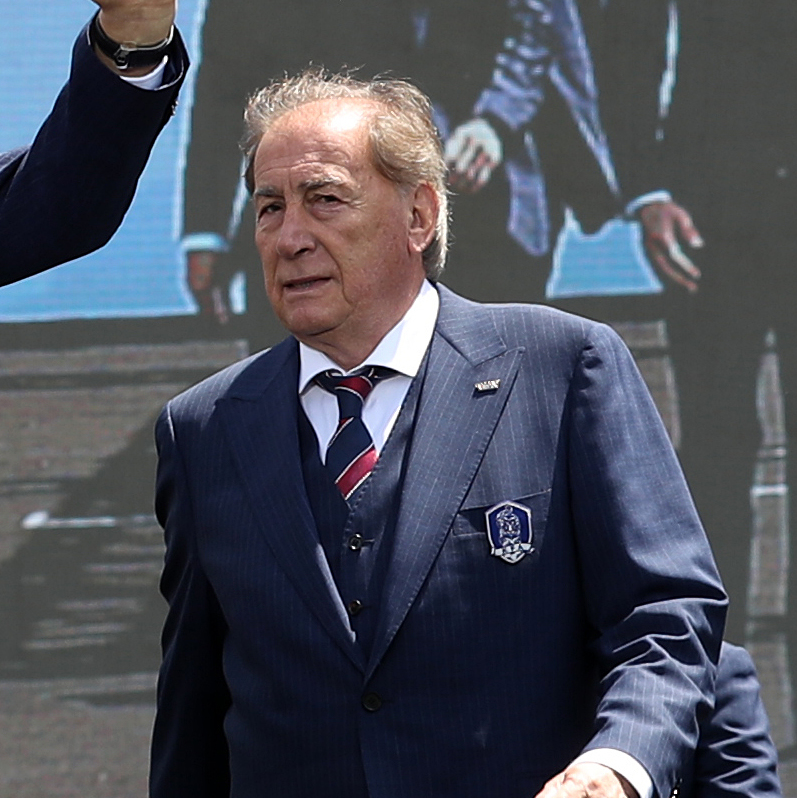
- Grande with South Korea at the 2018 World Cup

Personal information
- Full name: José Antonio Grande Cereijo
- Date of birth: 17 September 1947 (age 79)
- Place of birth: Valencia, Spain
- Height: 1.82 m (5 ft 11 1/2 in)
- Position: Midfielder

Youth career
- 1963–1967: Real Madrid

Senior career*
Years	Team	Apps	(Gls)
1967–1974	Real Madrid	83	(9)
1967–1968	→ Rayo Vallecano (loan)	30	(14)
1973–1974	→ Racing Santander (loan)	33	(11)
1974–1977	Granada	92	(14)
1977–1978	Palencia	24	(3)
Total		262	(51)

International career
1969–1971	Spain U23	2	(0)
1968–1971	Spain amateur	14	(4)

Managerial career
- 1989–1996: Real Madrid C
- 1997: Real Madrid B
- 1997–2003: Real Madrid (assistant)
- 2004–2005: Beşiktaş (assistant)
- 2006–2007: Real Madrid (assistant)
- 2008–2016: Spain (assistant)
- 2017–2018: South Korea (assistant)
- * Club domestic league appearances and goals

José Antonio 'Toni' Grande Cereijo (born 17 September 1947) is a Spanish former professional football central midfielder and manager.

== Playing career ==
Born in Valencia, Grande graduated from Real Madrid's academy, going on to appear in 121 competitive games with the first team, winning two La Liga championships and one Copa del Rey trophy. He made his league debut on 19 January 1969 in a 2–2 away draw against Córdoba CF (90 minutes played), but only totalled 14 appearances over his first two seasons; he did manage to score four times in the European Cup during his spell, including twice in the 1969–70 edition in victories over Olympiakos Nicosia (8–0 away, 6–1 at home).

Grande also represented Rayo Vallecano, Racing de Santander, Granada CF and Palencia CF, the first and the last being the only clubs with which he did not play in the top division, where he amassed totals of 176 matches and 31 goals. He retired from professional football at the age of 31.

Internationally, Grande competed for Spain at the 1968 Summer Olympics as a member of Rayo.

== Coaching career ==
Grande returned to Real Madrid in 1979, managing several youth teams as well as Real Madrid Castilla and Real Madrid C. In the late 90s/early 2000s he worked as first-team assistant under several coaches, mainly Vicente del Bosque, then left the Santiago Bernabéu Stadium briefly and returned again, being part of Fabio Capello's coaching staff as the side won the 2007 national championship.

In 2004, Grande re-joined del Bosque during his brief adventure in Turkey with Beşiktaş JK. The pair reunited again four years later, in the same capacity, at the Spain national team.

On 2 November 2017, Grande was named assistant coach of South Korea under Shin Tae-Yong for their 2018 FIFA World Cup campaign.

== Managerial statistics ==
Managerial record by team and tenure
Team	Nat	From	To	Record								Ref
Team	Nat	From	To	G	W	D	L	GF	GA	GD	Win %	Ref
Real Madrid C	(Spain)	6 June 1989	2 September 1996	285	142	67	76	524	325	+199	49.82	
Real Madrid B	(Spain)	16 February 1997	16 June 1997	15	5	3	7	17	27	−10	33.33	
Total				300	147	70	83	541	352	+189	49.00	—

== Honours ==
Real Madrid

- La Liga: 1968–69, 1971–72
- Copa del Generalísimo: 1969–70
