= José Luis (footballer, born 1943) =

Spanish footballer (born 1943)

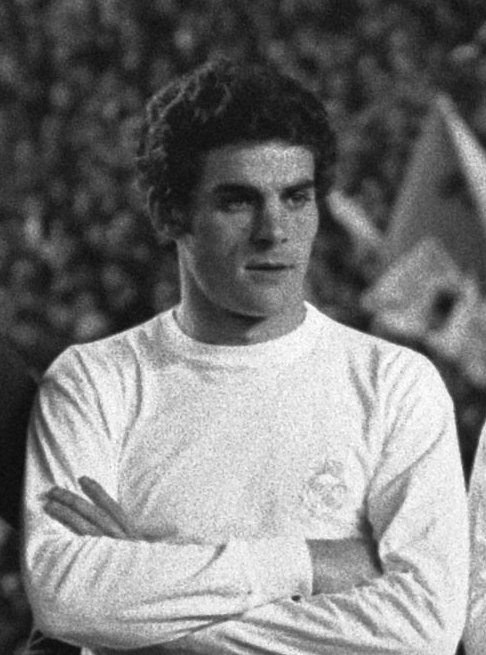

Personal information
- Full name: José Luis López Peinado
- Date of birth: 21 May 1943 (age 83)
- Place of birth: Tétouan, Spanish Morocco
- Height: 1.73 m (5 ft 8 in)
- Position: Defender

Senior career*
| Years | Team | Apps | (Gls) |
| 1964 | Real Madrid | 0 | (0) |
| 1966–1967 | Rayo Vallecano | 20 | (1) |
| 1967–1976 | Real Madrid | 183 | (16) |

International career^{‡}
| 1972–1973 | Spain | 4 | (0) |
- * Club domestic league appearances and goals as of 00:36, 31 March 2021 (UTC) ‡ National team caps and goals as of 00:36, 31 March 2021 (UTC)

José Luis López Peinado (born 21 May 1943 in Tetuán, Spanish Morocco), known as just José Luis, is a Spanish former professional association football player who played as a defender. He started his career with one season at Rayo Vallecano, before representing Real Madrid from 1967 to 1976. Born in Spanish Morocco, he played for the Spain national team.

== Career ==
| Club | Country | Period | League App. | League gl. |
|---|---|---|---|---|
| Rayo Vallecano | Spain | 1964-1967 |
| Real Madrid CF | Spain | 1967-1976 | 127 | 9 |

=== International selection ===
He played 4 matches for the Spain national football team.

== See also ==
- List of Spain international footballers born outside Spain
