= Ramón Grosso =

Spanish footballer and manager (1943–2002)

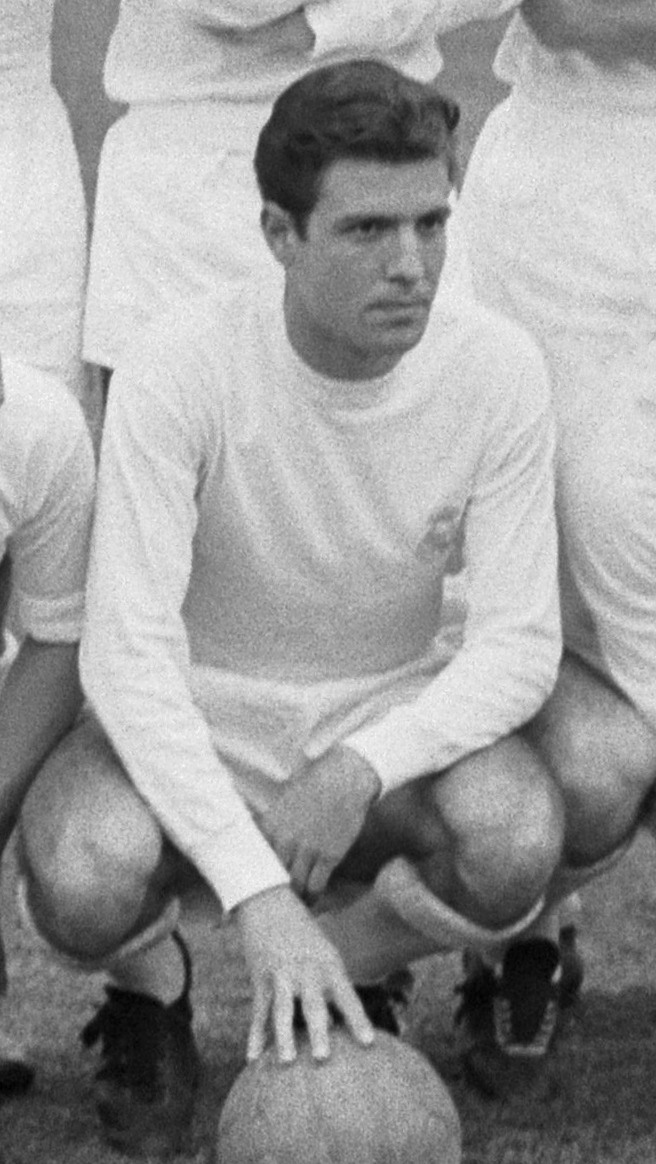
- Grosso in 1966

Personal information
- Full name: Ramón Moreno Grosso
- Date of birth: 8 December 1943
- Place of birth: Madrid, Spain
- Date of death: 13 February 2002 (aged 58)
- Place of death: Madrid, Spain
- Height: 1.76 m (5 ft 9 in)
- Position: Forward

Youth career
- Santo Domingo el Sabio
- 1959–1963: Real Madrid

Senior career*
Years	Team	Apps	(Gls)
1963–1964	Plus Ultra	15	(13)
1964	→ Atlético Madrid (loan)	12	(3)
1964–1976	Real Madrid	265	(54)
Total		292	(70)

International career
1963–1964	Spain amateur	9	(9)
1964	Spain B	1	(0)
1967–1970	Spain	14	(1)

Managerial career
- 1987: Real Madrid B
- 1991: Real Madrid (interim)
- 1997: Real Madrid B
- * Club domestic league appearances and goals

Ramón Moreno Grosso (8 December 1943 – 13 February 2002) was a Spanish football forward and manager.

He spent 12 La Liga seasons with Real Madrid, appearing in 366 competitive matches (75 goals scored) and winning 11 major titles, including the 1966 European Cup.

== Club career ==
Born in Madrid, Grosso reached Real Madrid's youth system at the age of 15. He returned after a short loan at neighbouring Atlético Madrid where he was instrumental in avoiding relegation from La Liga in the 1963–64 season, going on to remain 12 years at the Santiago Bernabéu Stadium.

Even though his teammates included the likes of Amancio Amaro, Francisco Gento or Ferenc Puskás, Grosso was team top scorer in his first two seasons, scoring 17 goals from 28 appearances in 1964–65 and 11 in 29 in the following. He made his debut in the European Cup on 23 September 1964, scoring in the 5–2 away win over Boldklubben 1909.

In the following years, Grosso played in several positions for Real Madrid, even being placed as goalkeeper in the Ramón de Carranza Trophy match against Boca Juniors. For his "team-first" approach he was eventually dubbed Obrero (worker), and he left his main club in June 1976 at the age of 32, retiring from football subsequently.

Grosso continued to work with Real in the following decades, as a manager: he started in the youth sides, then worked as head coach with Real Madrid Castilla in two separate Segunda División campaigns (23 games in 1986–87 and one in 1996–97, suffering relegation in the latter), and finally as assistant to the main squad; on 24 March 1991, following the dismissal of Alfredo Di Stéfano and before the appointment of Radomir Antić, he acted as interim to the latter in a 1–1 home draw with Real Oviedo.

== International career ==
Grosso won 14 caps for Spain in three years. His debut occurred on 1 February 1967 in a 0–0 draw against Turkey at the Ali Sami Yen Stadium for the UEFA Euro 1968 qualifiers, and he scored in the second contest between the two teams, a 2–0 victory in Bilbao.

=== International goals ===
#	Date	Venue	Opponent	Score	Result	Competition
1.	31 May 1967	San Mamés, Bilbao, Spain	Turkey	1–0	2–0	Euro 1968 qualifying

== Death ==
After a long battle with cancer, Grosso died on 13 February 2002 in his hometown of Madrid, aged 58. He was survived by his wife Amparo and five children, including the oldest María Ángela, who married Real Madrid player Paco Llorente.

== Honours ==
Real Madrid

- La Liga: 1964–65, 1966–67, 1967–68, 1968–69, 1971–72, 1974–75, 1975–76
- Copa del Generalísimo: 1969–70, 1973–74, 1974–75
- European Cup: 1965–66
