= José Luis Borja =

Spanish footballer

José Luis Borja Alarcón (born 29 May 1947 in Cabezo de Torres-Murcia, Spain) is a former Spanish professional footballer.

He spent his career as a goalkeeper.

== Club career ==
Club	Country	Period	League App.	League gl.
Real Madrid C.F.	Spain	1979–1981	27	0
RCD Espanyol	Spain	1986–1987	90	0
