= Ignacio Zoco =

Spanish footballer (1939–2015)

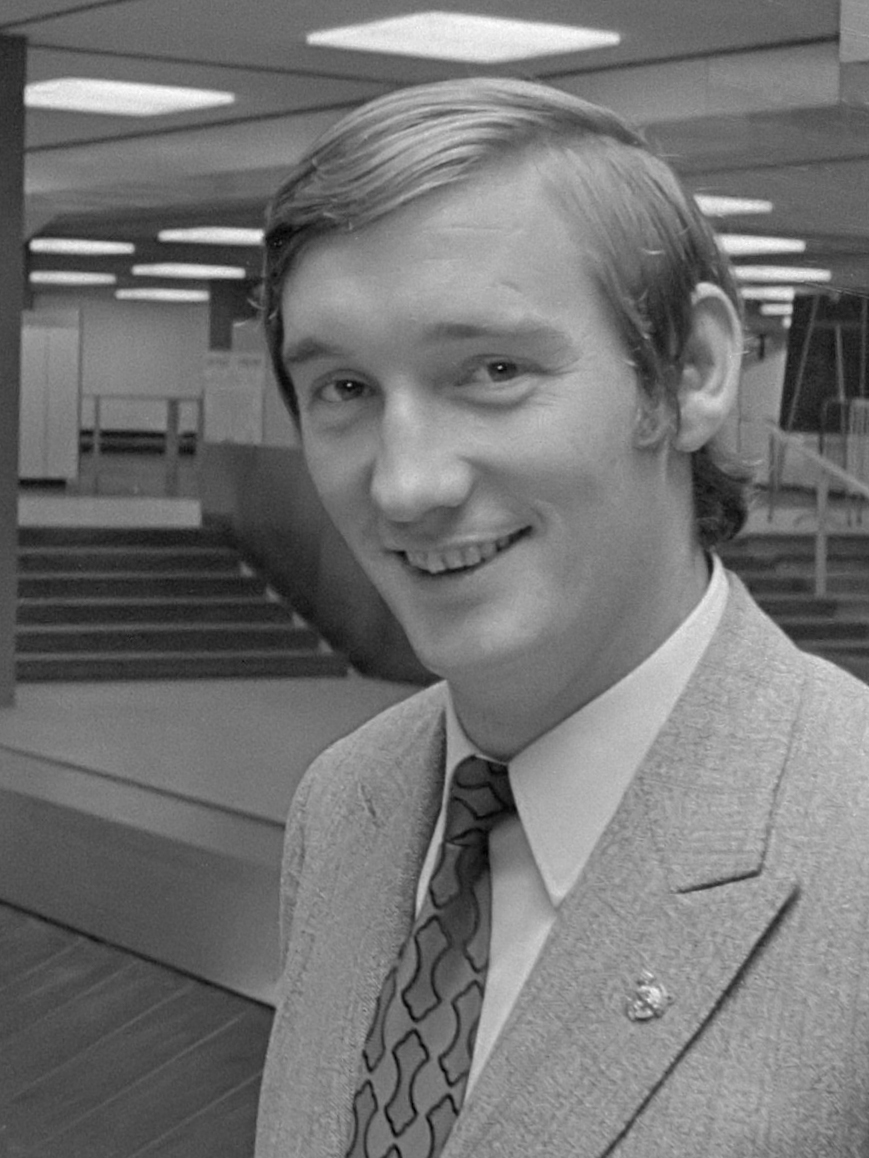
- Zoco in 1971

Personal information
- Full name: Ignacio Zoco Esparza
- Date of birth: 31 July 1939
- Place of birth: Garde, Spain
- Date of death: 28 September 2015 (aged 76)
- Place of death: Madrid, Spain
- Height: 1.83 m (6 ft 0 in)
- Position: Defensive midfielder

Youth career
- Esperanza

Senior career*
Years	Team	Apps	(Gls)
1957–1959	Oberena		
1959–1962	Osasuna	69	(4)
1959	→ Iruña (loan)		
1962–1974	Real Madrid	318	(8)
Total		387	(12)

International career
1961	Spain B	1	(0)
1961–1969	Spain	25	(1)
Medal record
Representing Spain
European Nations' Cup
Winner	1964 Spain
- * Club domestic league appearances and goals

Ignacio Zoco Esparza (31 July 1939 – 28 September 2015) was a Spanish footballer who played as a defensive midfielder.

He spent 12 years of his professional career with Real Madrid, appearing in 434 competitive matches and winning ten major titles.

Zoco played more than 20 times with Spain, winning the 1964 European Nations' Cup and also representing the nation at the 1966 World Cup.

== Club career ==
Born in Garde, Navarre, Zoco joined CA Osasuna from another side in the region, amateurs CD Oberena. After spending the first months on loan to CD Iruña, he made his La Liga debut on 10 January 1960 in a 2–1 away loss against Real Oviedo, and eventually started in all of his appearances as the season ended in relegation.

In the summer of 1962, Zoco signed for powerhouse Real Madrid, playing only 13 matches in his first year, which ended with league conquest, but becoming a starter from there onwards. In 1965–66, apart from appearing in every minute in the domestic competition, he added nine complete games in that campaign's European Cup, including the final against FK Partizan (2–1 win).

Apart from those two accolades, Zoco won a further six national championships and two Copa del Rey trophies with Real Madrid, totalling 64 appearances in European competition with the Merengues (six goals scored). He retired in June 1974 at the age of 35 and, 20 years later, was appointed the club's match delegate in replacement of Miguel Ángel González, retaining the position until 1998.

== International career ==
Zoco earned 25 caps for Spain, making his debut on 19 April 1961 in a 2–1 away win against Wales for the 1962 FIFA World Cup qualifiers. He was selected for the squads at the 1964 European Nations' Cup, helping the national team to win the tournament, and the 1966 World Cup.

== Personal life and death ==
Zoco married singer-songwriter María Ostiz (born 1944) in 1968, with the couple fathering three children and going on to remain married until his death. He succeeded Alfredo Di Stéfano at the helm of Real Madrid's Veterans Association, after the latter's death.

Zoco died in Madrid on 28 September 2015, after a long illness. He was 76 years old.

== Career statistics ==
#	Date	Venue	Opponent	Score	Result	Competition
1.	1 December 1963	Mestalla, Valencia, Spain	Belgium	1–1	1–2	Friendly

== Honours ==
Real Madrid

- La Liga: 1962–63, 1963–64, 1964–65, 1966–67, 1967–68, 1968–69, 1971–72
- Copa del Generalísimo: 1969–70, 1973–74; runner-up: 1967–68
- European Cup: 1965–66
- UEFA Cup Winners' Cup runner-up: 1970–71
- Intercontinental Cup runner-up: 1966

Spain

- UEFA European Championship: 1964

Individual

- UEFA European Championship Team of the Tournament: 1964
