= 1964–65 La Liga =

34th season of La Liga

Primera División
- Season: 1964–65
- Champions: Real Madrid (11th title)
- Relegated: Murcia; Levante; Oviedo; Deportivo La Coruña
- European Cup: Real Madrid
- Cup Winners' Cup: Atlético Madrid
- Matches: 240
- Goals: 659 (2.75 per match)
- Top goalscorer: Cayetano Ré (26 goals)
- Biggest home win: Barcelona 8–1 Murcia; Valencia 8–1 Oviedo
- Biggest away win: Murcia 1–5 Atlético Madrid
- Highest scoring: Barcelona 8–1 Murcia; Valencia 8–1 Oviedo

The 1964–65 La Liga was the 34th season since its establishment. The season began on 13 September 1964, and concluded on 18 April 1965.

== Stadia and locations ==
Location of teams in La Liga 1964–65
Canary Islands

Team	Home city	Stadium
Atlético Bilbao	Bilbao	San Mamés
Atlético Madrid	Madrid	Metropolitano
Barcelona	Barcelona	Nou Camp
Córdoba	Córdoba	El Arcángel
Deportivo La Coruña	A Coruña	Riazor
Elche	Elche	Altabix
Español	Barcelona	Sarrià
Las Palmas	Las Palmas	Insular
Levante	Valencia	Vallejo
Murcia	Murcia	La Condomina
Oviedo	Oviedo	Carlos Tartiere
Real Betis	Seville	Benito Villamarín
Real Madrid	Madrid	Santiago Bernabéu
Sevilla	Seville	Ramón Sánchez Pizjuán
Valencia	Valencia	Mestalla
Zaragoza	Zaragoza	La Romareda

== League table ==
Pos	Team	Pld	W	D	L	GF	GA	GD	Pts	Qualification or relegation
1	Real Madrid (C)	30	21	5	4	64	18	+46	47	Qualification for the European Cup preliminary round
2	Atlético Madrid	30	20	3	7	58	27	+31	43	Qualification for the Cup Winners' Cup first round (Note: Atlético Madrid qualified to the Cup Winners' Cup as champions of the Copa del Generalísimo.)
3	Zaragoza	30	19	2	9	60	37	+23	40	Invited for the Inter-Cities Fairs Cup
4	Valencia	30	17	4	9	59	37	+22	38	Invited for the Inter-Cities Fairs Cup
5	Córdoba	30	16	3	11	36	34	+2	35	
6	Barcelona	30	14	4	12	59	41	+18	32	Invited for the Inter-Cities Fairs Cup
7	Atlético Bilbao	30	13	6	11	36	41	−5	32	
8	Elche	30	14	3	13	38	43	−5	31	
9	Las Palmas	30	11	7	12	36	43	−7	29	
10	Sevilla	30	11	4	15	38	50	−12	26	
11	Español	30	12	1	17	37	39	−2	25	Invited for the Inter-Cities Fairs Cup
12	Real Betis	30	8	7	15	33	45	−12	23	
13	Murcia (R)	30	5	13	12	28	49	−21	23	Qualification for the relegation play-offs
14	Levante (R)	30	8	5	17	37	51	−14	21	Qualification for the relegation play-offs
15	Oviedo (R)	30	7	6	17	22	54	−32	20	Relegation to the Segunda División
16	Deportivo La Coruña (R)	30	6	3	21	18	50	−32	15	Relegation to the Segunda División

Source: BDFútbol
Rules for classification: 1) Points; 2) Head-to-head results; 3) Goal difference; 4) Number of goals scored
(C) Champions; (R) Relegated

== Results ==
Home \ Away	ATB	ATM	BAR	COR	DEP	ELC	ESP	LPA	LEV	MUR	OVI	BET	RMA	SEV	VAL	ZAR
Atlético Bilbao	—	2–1	0–0	1–0	0–0	2–1	2–1	3–1	1–1	1–2	3–0	1–0	1–1	1–0	3–2	3–1
Atlético Madrid	4–0	—	3–2	3–0	1–0	2–0	3–0	2–1	3–0	2–0	5–1	2–1	0–1	3–1	2–1	2–3
Barcelona	4–0	2–3	—	4–1	2–0	1–1	1–0	4–0	4–2	8–1	5–0	0–0	1–2	4–3	2–0	2–0
Córdoba	1–0	0–0	1–0	—	6–0	2–0	2–1	0–0	3–0	0–0	1–0	1–0	1–0	1–0	1–0	2–1
La Coruña	1–2	0–1	1–2	2–0	—	0–1	1–4	1–0	1–0	2–0	1–1	1–0	0–2	4–0	1–2	0–2
Elche	1–0	1–0	2–0	2–1	3–0	—	2–1	2–0	4–2	2–0	2–0	3–0	1–1	0–1	1–3	3–1
Español	3–1	1–0	0–0	2–4	2–0	1–0	—	1–0	2–1	1–0	5–1	3–0	1–2	0–2	1–2	4–2
Málaga	3–1	2–3	2–1	1–0	2–0	2–0	1–0	—	1–0	0–0	3–0	2–2	1–1	4–1	3–2	1–3
Levante	2–2	0–1	5–1	2–0	2–0	2–0	2–0	2–2	—	1–2	0–0	3–1	0–1	3–2	2–1	0–1
Murcia	1–1	1–5	0–2	0–1	2–0	4–0	1–0	1–1	1–1	—	0–0	1–1	1–2	1–1	1–1	1–2
Oviedo	1–0	0–3	2–0	1–0	0–0	1–3	3–1	2–0	2–0	1–1	—	1–2	0–1	2–3	0–1	2–0
Real Betis	1–2	1–1	2–1	0–1	4–0	2–2	0–1	2–0	1–0	2–2	0–0	—	3–1	2–0	0–1	2–1
Real Madrid	1–0	0–1	4–1	6–1	2–0	3–0	1–0	6–0	4–1	4–1	3–0	6–1	—	4–0	3–0	1–1
Sevilla	1–2	0–0	2–1	2–4	2–1	1–0	1–0	1–2	5–2	0–0	1–0	4–2	0–1	—	1–1	2–1
Valencia	2–0	3–1	2–4	2–1	1–0	5–0	3–1	2–1	2–0	2–2	8–1	2–0	0–0	3–1	—	3–0
Zaragoza	4–1	3–1	2–0	4–0	4–1	5–1	1–0	0–0	3–1	5–1	2–0	2–1	1–0	1–0	4–2	—

Source: BDFútbol
Legend: Blue = home team win; Yellow = draw; Red = away team win.

== Relegation play-offs ==
Team 1	Agg.	Team 2	1st leg	2nd leg
Murcia	2–3	Sabadell	2–2	0–1
Málaga	4–2	Levante	4–2	0–0

== Pichichi Trophy ==
Rank	Player	Club	Goals
1	(Paraguay) Cayetano Ré	Barcelona	25
2	(Brazil) Waldo	Valencia	21
3	(Spain) Luis Aragonés	Atlético Madrid	19
4	(Spain) Ramón Grosso	Real Madrid	17
5	(Spain) Fernando Ansola	Real Betis	14
5	(Peru) Juan Seminario	Barcelona	14
