= Manuel Velázquez =

Spanish footballer

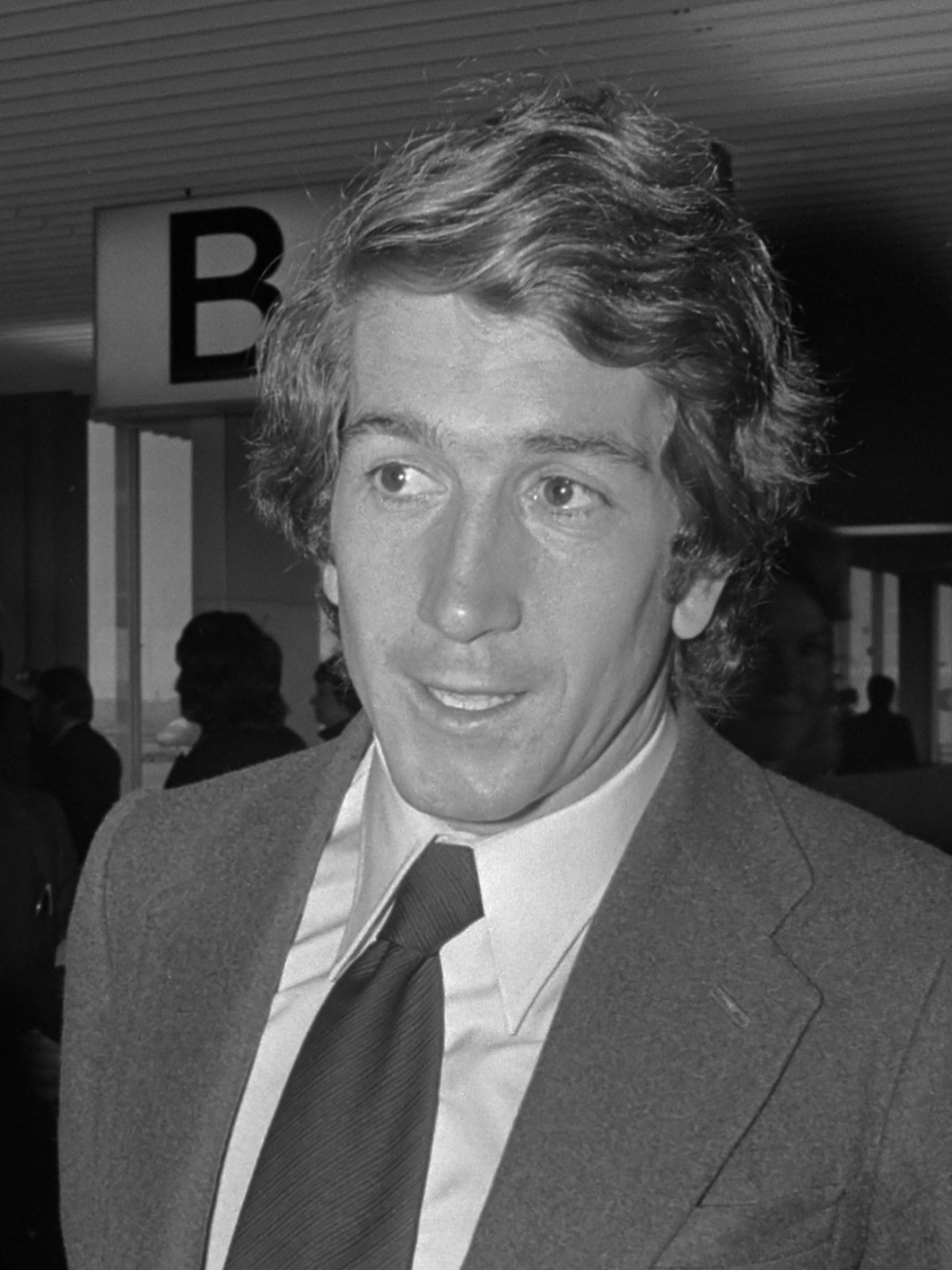
- Velázquez in 1973

Personal information
- Full name: Manuel Velázquez Villaverde
- Date of birth: 24 January 1943
- Place of birth: Madrid, Spain
- Date of death: 15 January 2016 (aged 72)
- Place of death: Fuengirola, Spain
- Height: 1.75 m (5 ft 9 in)
- Position: Midfielder

Youth career
- 1958–1962: Real Madrid

Senior career*
Years	Team	Apps	(Gls)
1962–1977	Real Madrid	301	(48)
1962–1963	→ Rayo Vallecano (loan)		
1963–1965	→ Málaga (loan)	46	(14)
1978	Toronto Metros-Croatia	16	(1)
Total		363	(63)

International career
1967–1975	Spain	10	(2)
- * Club domestic league appearances and goals

Manuel Velázquez Villaverde (24 January 1943 – 15 January 2016) was a Spanish footballer who played as a central midfielder.

== Club career ==
Born in Madrid, Velázquez spent all of his 12 years in La Liga with Real Madrid. After three seasons on loan, to Rayo Vallecano and CD Málaga, helping the latter promote from Segunda División in 1965, he went on to appear in 402 competitive games for his main club whilst scoring 59 goals, winning six national championships, three Copa del Rey trophies and the 1965–66 edition of the European Cup, where he was featured in the final against FK Partizan.

In the 1967–68 campaign, Velázquez netted a career-best ten goals from 28 appearances – including a hat-trick in a 9–1 home rout of Real Sociedad– conquering the second of his domestic leagues. He ended his career at the age of 35, after six months in the North American Soccer League with Toronto Metros-Croatia.

== International career ==
Velázquez earned ten caps for the Spain national team in eight years. He made his debut on 1 February 1967, in a 0–0 away draw in Turkey for the UEFA Euro 1968 qualifiers.

== Death ==
Velázquez died on 15 January 2016 in Fuengirola, Andalusia. He was 72 years old.
