= 1969–70 Copa del Generalísimo =

68th Copa del Rey

Tournament details
- Country: Spain
- Teams: 160

Final positions
- Champions: Real Madrid (11th title)
- Runners-up: Valencia CF

Tournament statistics
- Matches played: 333

The 1969–70 Copa del Generalísimo was the 68th staging of the Spanish Cup. The competition began on 8 October 1969 and concluded on 28 June 1970 with the final.

== Round of 16 ==
Team 1	Agg.	Team 2	1st leg	2nd leg
Club Atlético de Madrid	2–3	Club Atlético de Bilbao	1–1	1–2
Real Betis Balompié	0–2	Club Ferrol	0–1	0–1
Celta Vigo	1–3	CF Barcelona	1–0	0–3
Real Murcia	5–1	Orihuela Deportiva CF	3–0	2–1
UD Las Palmas	3–4	Real Madrid CF	2–0	1–4
Pontevedra CF	1–10	Real Zaragoza	1–2	0–8
CD Sabadell CF	2–1	Real Sociedad	2–0	0–1
Valencia CF	4–2	Granada CF	3–0	1–2

Source: RSSSF

== Quarter-finals ==
Team 1	Agg.	Team 2	1st leg	2nd leg
Real Madrid CF	3–1	CF Barcelona	2–0	1–1
CD Sabadell CF	2–3	Club Atlético de Bilbao	2–1	0–2
Valencia CF	4–3	Club Ferrol	1–1	3–2
Real Zaragoza	9–1	Real Murcia	4–0	5–1

Source: RSSSF

== Semi-finals ==
Team 1	Agg.	Team 2	1st leg	2nd leg
Real Madrid CF	2–1	Club Atlético de Bilbao	0–1	2–0
Valencia CF	2–1	Real Zaragoza CD	2–0	0–1

Source: RSSSF

== Final ==
Team 1	Score	Team 2
Real Madrid CF	3–1	Valencia CF

Copa del Generalísimo
winners
Real Madrid
11th title
