= 1967–68 Real Madrid CF season =

65th season in existence of Real Madrid CF

Real Madrid CF
1967–68 season
- President: Santiago Bernabéu
- Head coach: Miguel Muñoz
- Stadium: Santiago Bernabéu
- Primera División: 1st (in European Cup)
- Copa del Generalísimo: Runners-up
- European Cup: Semi-finals
- Top goalscorer: League: Pirri (10); Manuel Velázquez; Amancio; All: Amancio (18)
Home colours	Away colours

The 1967–68 season is Real Madrid Club de Fútbol's 65th season in existence and the club's 36th consecutive season in the top flight of Spanish football.

== Summary ==
The club won its 13th League title ever and second in a row after recovered the number one spot from Atlético Madrid on round 16, the team clinched the trophy three points above runners-up CF Barcelona. In the Copa del Generalísimo, the team reached the Final with a chance to secure the domestic double. There, Real faced Barcelona, losing 0–1 after an early Zunzunegui own goal. After the end of the season, President Santiago Bernabéu gave the Laureada trophy to Pirri due to his outstanding playing in favor of Real Madrid, being only one of two players in club history to receive it.

Meanwhile, in the European Cup the team suffered to win the preliminary round series against Ajax with young star playmaker Johan Cruijff, the Dutch squad was finally defeated after extra time in Madrid. Then, the squad clinched the round of 16, and quarterfinals against Sparta Praha reaching the semi-finals where it was defeated by young star forward George Best and his Manchester United, losing the away match of the series (0–1 at Old Trafford). In the second leg at Madrid, the squad took a 3–1 advantage score in the first half, however, in the second half Manchester United managed to score two goals and getting the draw to reach the Final. The English squad included in its line up players such as: Denis Law (under surgery just before the Final), 1966 FIFA World Cup Champion Bobby Charlton and Nobby Stiles.

Goalkeeper Andres Junquera won the Zamora Trophy with the better average of goals conceded. After 9 years, two times European Cup winner defender Pachin left the club.

== Squad ==
Note: Flags indicate national team as defined under FIFA eligibility rules; some limited exceptions apply. Players may hold more than one non-FIFA nationality.

No.	Pos.	Nation	Player
—	GK	ESP	Andrés Junquera
—	DF	ESP	Ignacio Zoco
—	DF	ESP	Manuel Sanchís
—	DF	ESP	Fernando Zunzunegui
—	DF	ESP	Antonio Calpe
—	MF	ESP	Pirri
—	MF	ESP	Manuel Velázquez
—	MF	ESP	Chato González
—	FW	ESP	Amancio Amaro
—	FW	ESP	Ramón Grosso
—	FW	ESP	Francisco Gento

No.	Pos.	Nation	Player
—	GK	ESP	Antonio Betancort
—	FW	ARG	Miguel Pérez
—	DF	ESP	José Luis
—	FW	ESP	José Luis Veloso
—	FW	ESP	Manuel Bueno
—	MF	ESP	Fernando Serena
—	DF	ESP	Pedro de Felipe
—	DF	ESP	Vicente Miera
—	DF	ESP	Rafael de Diego
—	MF	ESP	Félix Ruiz
—	DF	ESP	Pachín
—	FW	ESP	Antonio Iznata
—	GK	ESP	José Araquistáin

=== Transfers ===
In
Pos.	Name	from	Type
FW	Miguel Pérez	Club Sportivo Italiano	–
DF	José Luis	Rayo Vallecano	–
FW	Rafael De Diego	Real Oviedo	–
DF	Antonio Iznata	Rayo Vallecano	–
GK	Miguel Angel		–

Out
Pos.	Name	To	Type
FW	Fernand Goyvaerts	Elche CF	–
MF	Juanito	Castellon	–

== Competitions ==
=== La Liga ===
==== Position by round ====
Team / Round	1	2	3	4	5	6	7	8	9	10	11	12	13	14	15	16	17	18	19	20	21	22	23	24	25	26	27	28	29	30
Real Madrid	2	1	2	2	2	2	2	2	2	2	2	2	3	2	2	1	1	1	1	1	1	1	1	1	1	1	1	1	1	1

==== League table ====
Pos	Team	Pld	W	D	L	GF	GA	GD	Pts	Qualification or relegation
1	Real Madrid (C)	30	16	10	4	55	26	+29	42	Qualification for the European Cup first round
2	Barcelona	30	15	9	6	48	29	+19	39	Qualification for the Cup Winners' Cup first round (Note: Barcelona qualified to the Cup Winners' Cup as champions of the Copa del Generalísimo.)
3	Las Palmas	30	17	4	9	56	41	+15	38	
4	Valencia	30	13	8	9	52	38	+14	34	Invited for the Inter-Cities Fairs Cup
5	Zaragoza	30	13	7	10	43	34	+9	33	Invited for the Inter-Cities Fairs Cup

Source: BDFútbol
Rules for classification: 1) Points; 2) Head-to-head results; 3) Goal difference; 4) Number of goals scored
(C) Champions

==== Matches ====
10 September 1967 1	Sevilla CF	0–2	Real Madrid	Sevilla
		Report	Pirri 57'; Amancio 64'	Stadium: Estadio Sanchez Pizjuan; Referee: Zariquiegui Izco

16 September 1967 2	Real Madrid	9–1	Real Sociedad	Madrid
	Amancio 8'; Pirri 42'; Bueno 52'; Miguel Pérez 55'; Velázquez 56'; Velázquez 64'; Velázquez 73'; Pirri 77'; Amancio 89' (pen.)	Report	Mendiluce 75'	Stadium: Estadio Santiago Bernabéu; Referee: Bueno Perales

24 September 1967 3	Real Zaragoza	0–0	Real Madrid	Zaragoza
		Report		Stadium: La Romareda

7 October 1967 4	Real Madrid	2–2	Español	Madrid
	Grosso 58'; Veloso 69'	Report	José María 3' (pen.); Marcial 79'	Stadium: Estadio Santiago Bernabéu; Referee: Martín Álvarez

15 October 1967 5	Atletico de Bilbao	1–2	Real Madrid	Bilbao
	Arieta 20'	Report	Aranguren 59' (o.g.); Gento 70' (pen.)	Stadium: San Mames; Referee: Lloris Antonino

29 October 1967 6	Real Madrid	0–0	Atlético Madrid	Madrid
		Report		Stadium: Chamartín

5 November 1967 7	Valencia CF	2–0	Real Madrid	Valencia
	Paquito 58'; Claramunt 87'; Tatono 85'	Report		Stadium: Estadio Mestalla; Referee: Pintado Viu

11 November 1967 8	Real Madrid	3–0	Real Betis	Madrid
	Velázquez 20'; Félix Ruiz 47'; Gento 54'	Report		Stadium: Chamartín; Referee: Rigo Sureda

19 November 1967 9	CE Sabadell FC	2–4	Real Madrid	Sabadell
	Seminario 12'; Zaballa 28'	Report	Velázquez 11'; Pirri 27'; Gento 66'; Gento 75'	Stadium: Cruz Alta; Referee: Gardeazabal Garay

3 December 1967 10	Real Madrid	4–0	Córdoba CF	Madrid
	Pirri 4'; Velázquez 15'; Amancio 69'; Pirri 71'	Report		Stadium: Chamartín; Referee: Ortiz de Mendibil

3 December 1967 11	Elche CF	0–0	Real Madrid	Elche
		Report

10 December 1967 12	Real Madrid	1–1	CF Barcelona	Madrid
	Gento 65' (pen.)	Report	Zaldúa 78'	Stadium: Estadio Santiago Bernabéu; Referee: Lloris Antonino

17 December 1967 13	Pontevedra CF	3–0	Real Madrid	Pontevedra
	Roldán 4'; Antonio 77'; Odriozola 88'	Report		Stadium: Pasarón; Referee: Rigo Sureda

30 December 1967 14	UD Las Palmas	2–2	Real Madrid	Las Palmas de Gran Canaria
	Herman 44'; Gilberto 48'	Report	Ruiz 33'; Pirri 54'	Stadium: Estadio Insular

7 January 1968 15	Real Madrid	3–0	CD Málaga	Madrid
	Grosso 26'; Perez 74'; Amancio 84'	Report		Stadium: Estadio Santiago Bernabéu

14 January 1968 16	Real Madrid	1–0	Sevilla CF	Madrid
	Peinado 80'	Report		Stadium: Estadio Santiago Bernabéu

15 January 1968 17	Real Sociedad	0–1	Real Madrid	San Sebastián
		Report	Amancio 38'	Stadium: Atocha

28 January 1968 18	Real Madrid	3–2	Real Zaragoza	Zaragoza
	De Diego 6'; Amancio 38'; Amancio 80'	Report	43' Bustillo; 87' Fontaine	Stadium: La Romareda

4 February 1968 19	Español	0–4	Real Madrid	Barcelona
		Report	Velazquez 56'; Velazquez 81'; Gento 61'; Amancio 88'	Stadium: Estadio Sarria

11 February 1968 20	Real Madrid	0–0	Atletico de Bilbao	Madrid
		Report		Stadium: Estadio Santiago Bernabéu

19 February 1968 21	Atlético Madrid	1–1	Real Madrid	Madrid
	Ufarte 80'	Report	Amancio 65'	Stadium: Manzanares

25 February 1968 22	Real Madrid	0–2	Valencia CF	Madrid
		Report	Waldo 16'; Ansola 76'	Stadium: Chamartín

3 March 1968 23	Real Betis	1–2	Real Madrid	Sevilla
	Landa 35'	Report	Perez 20'; Velazquez 44'	Stadium: Estadio Benito Villamarin

10 March 1968 24	Real Madrid	2–0	CE Sabadell FC	Madrid
	Gento 61' (pen.); Zoco 84'	Report		Stadium: Estadio Santiago Bernabéu

17 March 1968 25	Córdoba CF	3–3	Real Madrid	Córdoba
	Arana 20'; Arana 25'; Arana 83'		Gento 33'; Peinado 81'; Zoco 89'

24 March 1968 26	Real Madrid	2–0	Elche CF	Madrid
	Pirri 58'; Perez 70'	Report		Stadium: Estadio Santiago Bernabéu

9 April 1968 27	CF Barcelona	1–1	Real Madrid	Barcelona
	Saldua 12'	Report	Pirri 43'	Stadium: Estadio del CF Barcelona

14 April 1968 28	Real Madrid	1–0	Pontevedra CF	Madrid
	Grosso 20'			Stadium: Chamartín

20 April 1968 29	Real Madrid	2–1	UD Las Palmas	Madrid
	Velazquez 22'; Pirri 77'		Castellano 42'	Stadium: Chamartín

28 April 1968 30	CD Málaga	1–0	Real Madrid	Málaga
	Esteve 36'	Report		Stadium: Estadio La Rosaleda

=== Copa del Generalísimo ===
==== Round of 32 ====
11 May 1968	Real Madrid	2–0	Calvo Sotelo	Estadio Santiago Bernabéu
	De Diego 55'; Perez 64'			Stadium: Madrid

19 May 1968	Calvo Sotelo	0–1	Real Madrid
			Amancio 51'

==== Eightfinals ====
26 May 1968	Real Madrid	1–0	Sevilla CF	Estadio Santiago Bernabéu
	Zoco 32'	Report		Stadium: Madrid; Referee: Jose Mendibil

1 June 1968	Sevilla CF	3–4	Real Madrid	Estadio Sanchez Pizjuan
	Eloy 14'; Berruso 16'; Laura 19'	Report	Peinado 27'; Peinado 63'; Velazquez 55'; Bueno 89'	Stadium: Sevilla; Referee: Antonio Sureda

==== Quarter-finals ====
9 June 1968	Real Zaragoza	3–2	Real Madrid	Valencia
	Fontenla 16'; Bustillo 43'; Santos 71'	Report	Peinado 41'; Amancio 47'	Stadium: Estadio Mestalla; Referee: Daniel Isco

15 June 1968	Real Madrid	2–0	Real Zaragoza	Madrid
	Ruiz 8'; Amancio 62' (pen.)	Report		Stadium: Santiago Bernabéu; Referee: Daniel Isco

==== Semifinals ====
23 June 1968	Celta de Vigo	3–2	Real Madrid	Vigo
	Telles 59'; Manolo 79'; Lescano 89'		Ruiz 4'; Ruiz 90'	Stadium: Balaídos; Referee: Jose Mendibil

1 July 1968	Real Madrid	3–0	Celta de Vigo	Madrid
	Peinado 25'; Peinado 53'; Amancio 34'			Stadium: Santiago Bernabéu; Referee: Daniel Isco

==== Final ====
11 July 1968	CF Barcelona	1–0	Real Madrid	Santiago Bernabéu, Madrid
21:00 CET	Zunzunegui 6' (o.g.)	Report (in Spanish)		Attendance: 100,000; Referee: Antonio Rigo

=== European Cup ===
==== Preliminary round ====
20 September 1967	Ajax (Netherlands)	1–1	(Spain) Real Madrid	Amsterdam
	Cruyff 17'	Report	Pirri 35'	Stadium: Olympisch Stadion, Attendance: 55,940; Referee: (Netherlands) Jim Finney

11 October 1967	Real Madrid (Spain)	2–1 (a.e.t.)	(Netherlands) Ajax	Madrid
	Gento 58'; Veloso 99'	Report	Groot 69'	Stadium: Santiago Bernabéu Stadium; Attendance: 120,000; Referee: (Scotland) Bobby Davidson

==== Eightfinals ====
15 November 1967	Hvidovre (Denmark)	2–2	(Spain) Real Madrid	Copenhagen
	Hansen 25'; Petersen 71'	Report	Gento 35'; Pirri 47'	Stadium: Idrætsparken; Attendance: 40,663; Referee: (East Germany) Rudolf Glöckner

29 November 1967	Real Madrid (Spain)	4–1	(Denmark) Hvidovre	Madrid
	Velázquez 16'; Grosso 19', 30'; Gento 75'	Report	Petersen 28'	Stadium: Santiago Bernabéu Stadium; Attendance: 90,000; Referee: (Belgium) Vital Loraux

==== Quarter-finals ====
6 March 1968	Real Madrid (Spain)	3–0	(Czechoslovakia) Sparta Prague	Madrid
	Amancio 62', 63', 68'	Report		Stadium: Santiago Bernabéu Stadium; Attendance: 120,000; Referee: (England) Jim Finney

20 March 1968	Sparta Prague (Czechoslovakia)	2–1	(Spain) Real Madrid	Prague
	Kvašňák 36'; Dyba 45'	Report	Gento 57'	Stadium: Stadion Dr. Václava Vacka; Attendance: 40,431; Referee: (West Germany) Hans Rademacher

==== Semi-finals ====
24 April 1968	Manchester United (England)	1–0	(Spain) Real Madrid	Manchester
	Best 36'	Report		Stadium: Old Trafford; Attendance: 62,562; Referee: (Soviet Union) Tofik Bakhramov

15 May 1968	Real Madrid (Spain)	3–3	(England) Manchester United	Madrid
	Pirri 32'; Gento 41'; Amancio 45'	Report	Zoco 44' (o.g.); Sadler 73'; Foulkes 78'	Stadium: Santiago Bernabéu Stadium; Attendance: 125,000; Referee: (Italy) Antonio Sbardella

== Statistics ==
=== Players statistics ===
No.	Pos	Nat	Player	Total		Primera División		Copa		European Cup	
No.	Pos	Nat	Player	Apps	Goals	Apps	Goals	Apps	Goals	Apps	Goals
	GK	(Spain) ESP	Junquera	27	-27	22	-19	1	-3	4	-5
	DF	(Spain) ESP	Zoco	45	3	29	2	8	1	8	0
	DF	(Spain) ESP	Zunzunegui	42	0	26	0	9	0	7	0
	DF	(Spain) ESP	Sanchis	43	0	26	0	9	0	8	0
	DF	(Spain) ESP	Calpe	25	0	21	0	0	0	4	0
	MF	(Spain) ESP	Pirri	41	13	28	10	5	0	8	3
	MF	(Spain) ESP	González	16	0	8	0	4	0	4	0
	MF	(Spain) ESP	Velazquez	40	12	28	10	5	1	7	1
	FW	(Spain) ESP	Amancio	43	18	28	10	8	4	7	4
	FW	(Spain) ESP	Grosso	41	5	26	3	8	0	7	2
	FW	(Spain) ESP	Gento	32	13	24	8	1	0	7	5
	GK	(Spain) ESP	Betancort	20	-20	8	-7	8	-7	4	-6
	FW	(Argentina) ARG	Pérez	14	5	11	4	3	1	0	0
	DF	(Spain) ESP	José Luis	15	7	7	2	8	5	0	0
	FW	(Spain) ESP	Veloso	8	2	6	1	0	0	2	1
	FW	(Spain) ESP	Bueno	12	2	6	1	5	1	1	0
	MF	(Spain) ESP	Serena	11	0	6	0	3	0	2	0
	DF	(Spain) ESP	De Felipe	10	0	6	0	2	0	2	0
	DF	(Spain) ESP	Miera	9	0	5	0	4	0	0	0
	DF	(Spain) ESP	De Diego	8	2	4	1	1	1	3	0
	MF	(Spain) ESP	Ruiz	8	5	3	2	4	3	1	0
	DF	(Spain) ESP	Pachín	2	0	1	0	1	0	0	0
	FW	(Spain) ESP	Iznata	1	0	1	0				
	GK	(Spain) ESP	Araquistáin								

- Source: http://www.bdfutbol.com/en/t/t1967-682.html

== See also ==
- Yé-yé (Real Madrid)
