= 1966–67 Real Madrid CF season =

64th season in existence of Real Madrid CF

Real Madrid CF
1966–67 season
- President: Santiago Bernabéu
- Head coach: Miguel Muñoz
- Stadium: Chamartín
- Primera Division: 1st (in European Cup)
- Copa del Generalísimo: Quarter-finals
- European Cup: Quarter-finals
- Top goalscorer: League: Gento (11); All: Grosso (13)
Home colours	Away colours

The 1966–67 season is Real Madrid Club de Fútbol's 64th season in existence and the club's 35th consecutive season in the top flight of Spanish football.

== Summary ==
During Autumn the team lost the 1966 Intercontinental Cup against Uruguayan side Peñarol, being defeated the two matches of the series. The club won its 12th League title ever, finishing five points above runners-up CF Barcelona. New arrivals were Junquera from Langreo, Zunzunegui, Chato Gonzalez and midfielder Juanito both from Rayo Vallecano, also Rovira from RCD Mallorca. Left the club retiring of football were Uruguayan central defender José Santamaría and after eight campaigns Hungarian striker Ferenc Puskás too. Also, Aguero was transferred out to Granada, Isidro to Sabadell, Morollón to Valladolid, Pedro Casado to Sabadell and Pipi Suarez to Sevilla.

In the Copa del Generalísimo the club was eliminated by Valencia CF in the quarterfinals. Meanwhile, in the European Cup the squad was defeated by Helenio Herrera's Internazionale in the quarterfinals, losing the two matches of the series (0–1 in Madrid and 0–2 in Milan).

== Squad ==
Note: Flags indicate national team as defined under FIFA eligibility rules; some limited exceptions apply. Players may hold more than one non-FIFA nationality.

No.	Pos.	Nation	Player
—	GK	(Spain) ESP	Antonio Betancort
—	GK	(Spain) ESP	José Araquistáin
—	GK	(Spain) ESP	Andrés Junquera
—	DF	(Spain) ESP	Ignacio Zoco
—	DF	(Spain) ESP	Pedro de Felipe
—	DF	(Spain) ESP	Manuel Sanchís
—	DF	(Spain) ESP	Antonio Calpe
—	DF	(Spain) ESP	Pachín
—	DF	(Spain) ESP	Fernando Zunzunegui
—	DF	(Spain) ESP	Vicente Miera
—	MF	(Spain) ESP	Pirri
—	MF	(Spain) ESP	Manuel Velázquez
—	MF	(Spain) ESP	Félix Ruiz

No.	Pos.	Nation	Player
—	MF	(Spain) ESP	Fernando Serena
—	MF	(Spain) ESP	Chato González
—	MF	(Spain) ESP	Juanito
—	MF	(Spain) ESP	Fernando Rovira
—	FW	(Spain) ESP	Amancio Amaro
—	FW	(Spain) ESP	Ramón Grosso
—	FW	(Spain) ESP	Francisco Gento
—	FW	(Spain) ESP	José Luis Veloso
—	FW	(Spain) ESP	Manuel Bueno
—	FW	(Belgium) BEL	Fernand Goyvaerts
—	FW	(Spain) ESP	Jaime Blanco

=== Transfers ===
In
Pos.	Name	from	Type
GK	Andres Junquera	Langreo	–
DF	Fernando Zunzunegui	–	–
MF	Chato González	Rayo Vallecano	–
MF	Juanito	Rayo Vallecano	–
DF	Fernando Rovira	Mallorca	–

Out
Pos.	Name	To	Type
DF	José Santamaría	retired	–
MF	Juan Bautista Agüero	Granada CF	–
DF	Isidro	CE Sabadell CF	–
MF	Emilio Morollón	Real Valladolid	–
DF	Pedro Casado	CE Sabadell CF	–
MF	Pipi Suárez	Sevilla CF	–

== Competitions ==
=== La Liga ===
==== Position by Round ====
Team / Round	1	2	3	4	5	6	7	8	9	10	11	12	13	14	15	16	17	18	19	20	21	22	23	24	25	26	27	28	29	30
Real Madrid	1	1	3	3	2	2	2	1	2	1	1	1	1	1	1	1	1	1	1	1	1	1	1	1	1	1	1	1	1	1

==== League table ====
Pos	Team	Pld	W	D	L	GF	GA	GD	Pts	Qualification or relegation
1	Real Madrid (C)	30	19	9	2	58	22	+36	47	Qualification for the European Cup first round
2	Barcelona	30	20	2	8	58	29	+29	42	Invited for the Inter-Cities Fairs Cup
3	Español	30	15	7	8	50	40	+10	37	
4	Atlético Madrid	30	14	7	9	57	30	+27	35	Invited for the Inter-Cities Fairs Cup
5	Zaragoza	30	14	6	10	51	50	+1	34	Invited for the Inter-Cities Fairs Cup

Source: BDFútbol
Rules for classification: 1) Points; 2) Head-to-head results; 3) Goal difference; 4) Number of goals scored
(C) Champions

==== Matches ====
11 September 1966 1	Real Madrid	4–1	Elche CF	Madrid
	Grosso 18'; Pedro De Felipe (red card) 54'; Amancio 64'; Gento 67'; Gento 82' (pen.)	Report	Vavá 37'	Stadium: Chamartín; Referee: Birigay Nieva

18 September 1966 2	Pontevedra CF	0–1	Real Madrid	Pontevedra
		Report	Amancio 80'	Stadium: Pasarón; Referee: Ortiz de Mendibil

25 September 1966 3	Real Madrid	1–1	Español	Madrid
	Pirri 67'	Report	Amas 16'; Riera 87'	Stadium: Chamartín; Referee: Gomez Arribas

2 October 1966 4	Granada CF	1–1	Real Madrid	Granada
	Almagro 65'	Report	Pirri 70'	Stadium: Los Carmenes; Referee: Cerezuela Ruiz

8 October 1966 5	Real Madrid	3–1	Real Zaragoza	Madrid
	Felix Ruiz 23'; Serena 35'; Pirri 87' (pen.)	Report	Pirri 88' (own goal)	Stadium: Chamartín

16 October 1966 6	Sevilla CF	0–1	Real Madrid	Sevilla
		Report	Bueno 10'	Stadium: Estadio Sanchez Pizjuan

30 October 1966 7	UD Las Palmas	1–1	Real Madrid	Las Palmas de Gran Canaria
	José Juan 86'	Report	Marrero 4' (own goal)	Stadium: Estadio Insular; Referee: Pintado Viu

6 November 1966 8	Real Madrid	2–1	Hércules CF	Zaragoza
	Goyvaerts 39'; Amancio 63'	Report	Maxi Pelaez 70'	Stadium: Estadio La Romareda; Referee: Sanchez Rios

13 November 1966 9	Atletico de Bilbao	0–0	Real Madrid	Bilbao
		Report		Stadium: San Mames; Referee: Oliva Fortuny

20 November 1966 10	Real Madrid	1–0	CF Barcelona	Madrid
	Veloso 94'	Report		Stadium: Chamartín

27 November 1966 11	Deportivo La Coruña	1–0	Real Madrid	La Coruña
	Pose 43'; Sertucha 73' (pen.)	Report	Veloso 13'; Gento 14'; Gento 41'	Stadium: Nuevo Riazor; Referee: Gomez Arribas

4 December 1966 12	Real Madrid	4–2	Valencia CF	Bilbao
	Felix Ruiz 8'; Veloso 21'; Velazquez 31'; Gento 41'	Report	Claramunt 43'; Poli 53'	Stadium: San Mames; Referee: Bueno Perales

11 December 1966 13	Córdoba CF	0–1	Real Madrid	Córdoba
		Report	Grosso 89'	Stadium: Estadio El Arcangel; Referee: Izco

18 December 1966 14	Real Madrid	2–1	Atlético Madrid	Madrid
	Pirri 4'	Report	Gento 30'	Stadium: Chamartín; Referee: Rigo Sureda

1 January 1967 15	CD Sabadell CF	1–1	Real Madrid	Sabadell
	Palau 81'	Report	Gento 1' (pen.); Grosso 75'	Stadium: Cruz Alta; Referee: Medina Iglesias

2 January 1966 16	Elche CF	1–1	Real Madrid	Elche
	Romero 51'	Report	Bueno 74'	Stadium: Altabix; Referee: Rigo Sureda

15 January 1967 17	Real Madrid	2–0	Pontevedra CF	Madrid
	Felix Ruiz 46'; Gento 83' (pen.)	Report		Stadium: Chamartín; Referee: Sanchez Ibañez

22 January 1967 18	Español	2–3	Real Madrid	Barcelona
	Marcial 8'; Amas 51'	Report	Velazquez 34'; Felix Ruiz 72'; Grosso 77'	Stadium: Sarria; Referee: Izco

5 February 1967 19	Real Madrid	2–0	Granada CF	Madrid
	Pirri 38'; Velazq uez 57'	Report		Stadium: Chamartín; Referee: Ibañez Alarcon

12 February 1967 20	Real Zaragoza	2–1	Real Madrid	Zaragoza
	Marcelino 7'; Marcelino 63'	Report	Calpe 69' (pen.)	Stadium: La Romareda; Referee: Medina Iglesias

19 February 1967 21	Real Madrid	3–0	Sevilla CF	Madrid
	Pirri 13'; Amancio 19'; Grosso 40'	Report		Stadium: Chamartín; Referee: Ruiz Alciturri

25 February 1967 22	Real Madrid	1–1	UD Las Palmas	Madrid
	Grosso 36'	Report	Vegazo 7'	Stadium: Chamartín

5 March 1967 23	Hércules CF	0–2	Real Madrid	Alicante
		Report	Amancio 54'; Felix Ruiz 83'	Stadium: La Viña; Referee: Bueno Perales

12 March 1967 24	Real Madrid	4–0	Atletico Bilbao	Madrid
	Grosso 39'; Veloso 41'; Veloso 49'; Grosso 73'	Report		Stadium: Estadio Santiago Bernabéu; Referee: Oliva Fortuny

19 March 1967 25	CF Barcelona	2–1	Real Madrid	Barcelona
	Fusté 7'; Fusté 89'	Report	Amancio 42'; Miera (red card) 59'	Stadium: Estadio del CF Barcelona; Referee: Rigo Sureda

26 March 1967 26	Real Madrid	2–0	Deportivo La Coruña	Madrid
	Veloso 34'; Gento 85'	Report		Stadium: Estadio Santiago Bernabéu; Referee: Soto Montesinos

13 March 1966 27	Valencia CF	0–0	Real Madrid	Valencia
		Report		Stadium: Estadio Mestalla; Referee: Gomez Arribas

9 April 1967 28	Real Madrid	3–0	Córdoba CF	Madrid
	Grosso 52'; Veloso 53'; Amancio 89'	Report		Stadium: Chamartín; Referee: Lopez Zaballa

16 April 1967 29	Atlético Madrid	2–2	Real Madrid	Madrid
	Cardona 8'; Adelardo 87'	Report	Grosso 63'; Veloso 79'	Stadium: Manzanares; Referee: Medina Iglesias

23 April 1967 30	Real Madrid	5–0	CD Sabadell CF	Madrid
	Pirri 14'; Grosso 32'; Gento 37'; Veloso 84'; Gento 87'	Report		Stadium: Chamartín; Referee: Ruiz Alciturri

=== Copa del Generalísimo ===
==== Round of 32 ====
30 April 1967	Gimnastica de Torrelavega	2–2	Real Madrid

7 May 1967	Real Madrid	1–0	Gimnastica de Torrelavega	Estadio Santiago Bernabéu
				Stadium: Madrid

==== Eightfinals ====
14 May 1967	Deportivo La Coruña	3–2	Real Madrid	La Coruña
				Stadium: Nuevo Riazor

21 May 1967	Real Madrid	3–1	Deportivo La Coruña	Estadio Santiago Bernabéu
				Stadium: Madrid

==== Quarter-finals ====
4 June 1967	Valencia CF	2–1	Real Madrid	Valencia
				Stadium: Estadio Mestalla

11 June 1967	Real Madrid	0–1	Valencia CF	Madrid
				Stadium: Chamartín

=== European Cup ===
==== Eightfinals ====
16 November 1966	TSV 1860 München (West Germany)	1–0	(Spain) Real Madrid	Munich
	Küppers 39'	Report		Stadium: Grünwalder Stadion; Attendance: 30,901; Referee: (England) Kevin Howley

30 November 1966	Real Madrid (Spain)	3–1	(West Germany) TSV 1860 München	Madrid
	Grosso 21'; Veloso 34'; Pirri 52'	Report	Brunnenmeier 13'	Stadium: Santiago Bernabéu Stadium; Attendance: 80,000; Referee: (Austria) Eduard Babauczek

==== Quarter-finals ====
15 February 1967	Internazionale (Italy)	1–0	(Spain) Real Madrid	Milan
	Cappellini 54'	Report		Stadium: San Siro; Attendance: 52,726; Referee: (Hungary) István Zsolt

1 March 1967	Real Madrid (Spain)	0–2	(Italy) Internazionale	Madrid
		Report	Cappellini 24'; Zoco 57' (o.g.)	Stadium: Santiago Bernabéu Stadium, Attendance: 88,934; Referee: (Switzerland) Gottfried Dienst

=== Intercontinental Cup ===
12 October 1966	Peñarol (Uruguay)	2–0	(Spain) Real Madrid	Montevideo
	Spencer 39'; Spencer 79'	Report		Stadium: Estadio Centenario; Attendance: 58,324; Referee: (Chile) Claudio Vicuña

26 October 1966	Real Madrid (Spain)	0–2	(Uruguay) Peñarol	Madrid
		Report	Rocha 28' (pen.); Spencer 37'	Stadium: Santiago Bernabéu; Attendance: 71,063; Referee: (Italy) Concetto Lo Bello

== Statistics ==
=== Players statistics ===
No.	Pos	Nat	Player	Total		Primera Division		Copa del Generalisimo		European Cup	
No.	Pos	Nat	Player	Apps	Goals	Apps	Goals	Apps	Goals	Apps	Goals
	GK	(Spain) ESP	Betancort	29	-26	22	-15	4	-8	3	-3
	DF	(Spain) ESP	Zoco	36	1	26	0	6	1	4	0
	DF	(Spain) ESP	De Felipe	29	0	23	0	3	0	3	0
	DF	(Spain) ESP	Sanchis	32	0	23	0	5	0	4	0
	DF	(Spain) ESP	Calpe	27	1	19	1	6	0	2	0
	MF	(Spain) ESP	Pirri	35	10	27	7	4	2	4	1
	MF	(Spain) ESP	Ruiz	28	7	20	5	5	2	3	0
	MF	(Spain) ESP	Velazquez	33	3	26	3	4	0	3	0
	FW	(Spain) ESP	Amancio	34	7	25	7	5	0	4	0
	FW	(Spain) ESP	Grosso	33	13	24	10	5	2	4	1
	FW	(Spain) ESP	Gento	29	11	20	11	5	0	4	0
	GK	(Spain) ESP	Araquistain	9	-9	8	-7	0	0	1	-2
	GK	(Spain) ESP	Junquera	2	-1	0	0	2	-1		
	DF	(Spain) ESP	Pachín	15	0	13	0	0	0	2	0
	DF	(Spain) ESP	Zunzunegui	10	0	6	0	3	0	1	0
	DF	(Spain) ESP	Miera	6	0	5	0	1	0		
	MF	(Spain) ESP	Serena	15	1	11	1	3	0	1	0
	MF	(Spain) ESP	Chato González	5	0	5	0				
	MF	(Spain) ESP	Juanito	3	0	2	0	1	0		
	MF	(Spain) ESP	Rovira	1	1	0	0	1	1		
	FW	(Spain) ESP	Veloso	20	11	16	9	3	1	1	1
	FW	(Spain) ESP	Bueno	6	2	6	2	0	0	0	0
	FW	(Belgium) BEL	Goyvaerts	3	1	3	1				
	FW	(Spain) ESP	Blanco								

- Source: http://www.bdfutbol.com/en/t/t1966-672.html

== See also ==
- Yé-yé (Real Madrid)
