= 1968–69 Real Madrid CF season =

66th season in existence of Real Madrid CF

Real Madrid CF
1968–69 season
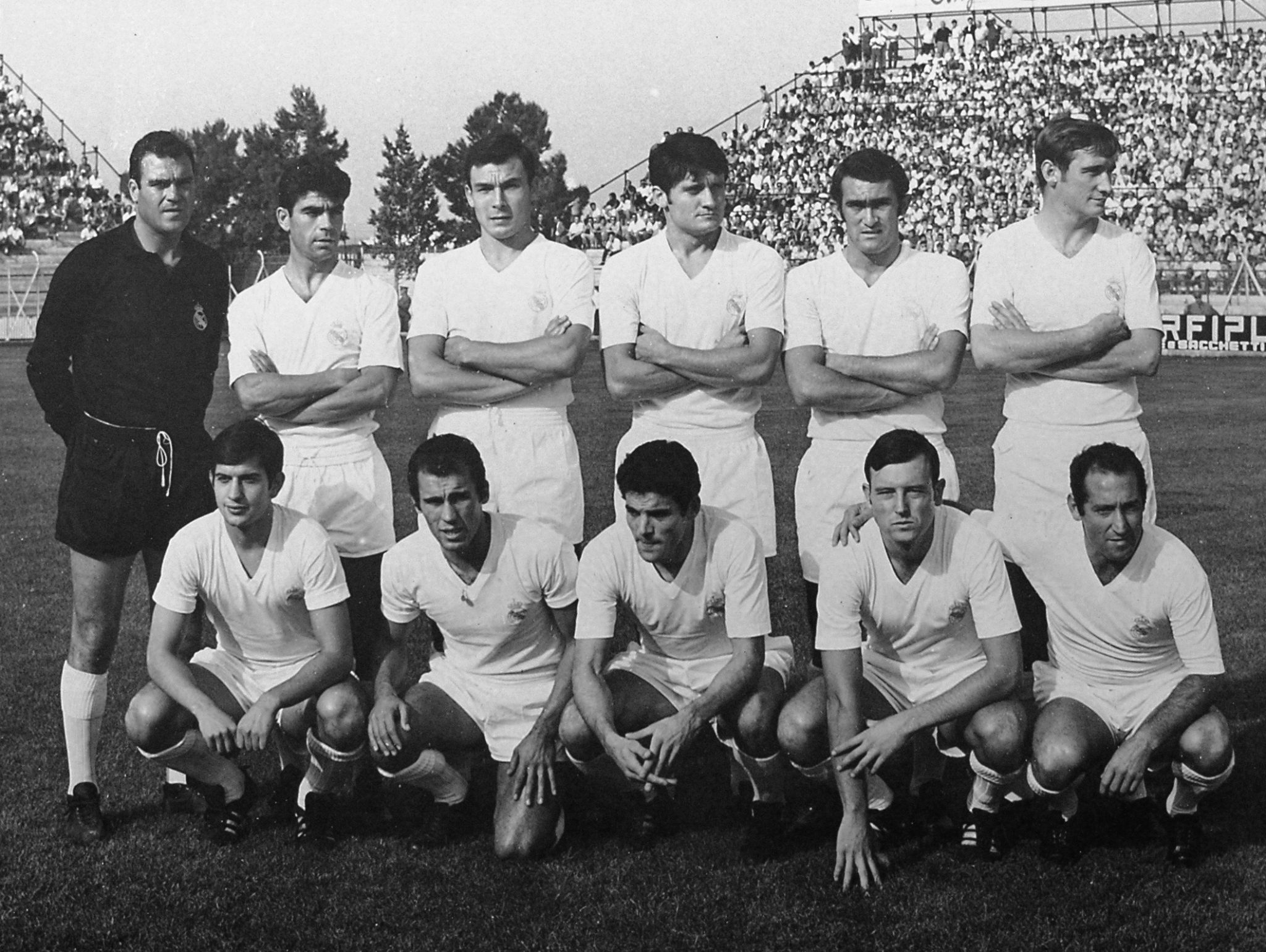
- 1968–69 Real Madrid team
- President: Santiago Bernabéu
- Head coach: Miguel Muñoz
- Stadium: Chamartín
- La Liga: 1st (in European Cup)
- Copa del Generalísimo: Round of 16
- European Cup: Round of 16
- Top goalscorer: League: Amancio (14); All: Pirri (17)
Home colours	Away colours

The 1968–69 season is Real Madrid Club de Fútbol's 66th season in existence and the club's 37th consecutive season in the top flight of Spanish football.

== Summary ==
The club won its 14th League title and second Three-peat,. The team set a record for the best start to a La Liga season with nine straight wins rounds the team clinched the trophy nine points above runners-up UD Las Palmas. The squad was defeated only once in 38 rounds by Elche CF. Also, Amancio won the Pichichi Trophy with 14 goals scored tied along José Eulogio Gárate from Atlético Madrid.

Shockingly, the team was early eliminated in the Round of 16 of the European Cup by Austrian side Rapid Wien which won 1:0 in the first leg in Wien and advanced to Quarter-finals due to away goals after losing 1:2 in Madrid in. In the Copa del Generalísimo, the club was eliminated in the Round of 16 by Atlético Madrid.

The "Ye-yé" era started to collapse for this campaign as three members Araquistáin, Serena and Pachín were transferred out.

== Squad ==
Note: Flags indicate national team as defined under FIFA eligibility rules; some limited exceptions apply. Players may hold more than one non-FIFA nationality.

No.	Pos.	Nation	Player
—	GK	ESP	Antonio Betancort
—	GK	ESP	Andrés Junquera
—	DF	ESP	Pedro de Felipe
—	DF	ESP	Manuel Sanchís
—	DF	ESP	Antonio Calpe
—	DF	ESP	Ignacio Zoco
—	DF	ESP	José Luis
—	MF	ESP	Manuel Velázquez
—	MF	ESP	Pirri
—	FW	ESP	Amancio Amaro
—	FW	ESP	Francisco Gento
—	FW	ESP	Ramón Grosso

No.	Pos.	Nation	Player
—	DF	ESP	Fernando Zunzunegui
—	FW	ARG	Miguel Pérez
—	FW	ESP	Manuel Bueno
—	DF	ESP	Grande
—	FW	ESP	José Luis Veloso
—	DF	ESP	Vicente Miera
—	DF	ESP	Pascual Babiloni
—	MF	ESP	Vidal
—	MF	ESP	Chato González
—	DF	ESP	Rafael de Diego

=== Transfers ===
In
Pos.	Name	from	Type
FW	Grande	Rayo Vallecano	–
DF	Babiloni	Castellón	–
FW	Vidal	CE Sabadell CF	–
DF	Gerardo Ortega de Francisco	Rayo Vallecano	–

Out
Pos.	Name	To	Type
GK	José Araquistáin	Elche CF	–
FW	Fernando Serena	Elche CF	–
MF	Pachín	Real Betis	–
MF	Antonio Iznata	Real Murcia	–
FW	Jaime Blanco	Real Betis	–
MF	Fernando Rovira	Calvo Sotelo	–

== Competitions ==
=== La Liga ===
==== Position by round ====
Team / Round	1	2	3	4	5	6	7	8	9	10	11	12	13	14	15	16	17	18	19	20	21	22	23	24	25	26	27	28	29	30
Real Madrid	2	2	1	1	1	1	1	1	1	1	1	1	1	1	1	1	1	1	1	1	1	1	1	1	1	1	1	1	1	1

==== League table ====
Pos	Team	Pld	W	D	L	GF	GA	GD	Pts	Qualification or relegation
1	Real Madrid (C)	30	18	11	1	46	21	+25	47	Qualification for the European Cup first round
2	Las Palmas	30	15	8	7	45	34	+11	38	Invited for the Inter-Cities Fairs Cup
3	Barcelona	30	13	10	7	40	18	+22	36	Invited for the Inter-Cities Fairs Cup
4	Sabadell	30	10	12	8	33	34	−1	32	Invited for the Inter-Cities Fairs Cup
5	Valencia	30	10	11	9	36	39	−3	31	Invited for the Inter-Cities Fairs Cup

Source: BDFútbol
Rules for classification: 1) Points; 2) Head-to-head results; 3) Goal difference; 4) Number of goals scored
(C) Champions

==== Matches ====
15 September 1968 1	Real Madrid	3–1	Español	Madrid
	Amancio 6'; Amancio 43'; Amancio 68'		Re 13'	Stadium: Santiago Bernabeu; Referee: Daniel Isco

22 September 1968 2	Deportivo La Coruña	2–4	Real Madrid	A Coruña
	Cortez 15'; Luis 47'		Veloso 53'; Gento 73'; Amancio 81'; Amancio 89'	Stadium: Estadio Riazor; Referee: Fernando Tejerina

29 September 1968 3	Real Madrid	2–0	Córdoba CF	Madrid
	Pirri 32'; Amancio 79'			Stadium: Estadio Santiago Bernabéu; Referee: Joaquim Pericas

6 October 1968 4	Atletico de Bilbao	0–1	Real Madrid	Bilbao
		Report	Amancio 34'	Stadium: San Mames; Referee: Agustin Alkturri

13 October 1968 5	Real Madrid	5–3	CE Sabadell CF	Madrid
	Velazquez 1'; Amancio 12'; Amancio 82'; Grosso 54'; Peinado 78'	Report	Marañon 45'; Puyol 57'; Vidal 80'	Stadium: Santiago Bernabeu; Referee: Pedro Ilordi

20 October 1968 6	Valencia CF	0–1	Real Madrid	Valencia
		Report	Peinado 89'	Stadium: Estadio Mestalla; Referee: Jose Casasola

3 November 1968 7	Real Madrid	2–1	Real Sociedad	Madrid
	Peinado 27'; Peinado 35'	Report	Arzak 9'	Stadium: Santiago Bernabeu; Referee: Alberto Alvarez

10 November 1968 8	Atlético Madrid	0–1	Real Madrid	Madrid
		Report	Amancio 65'	Stadium: Manzanares; Referee: Jose Mendibil

16 November 1968 9	Real Madrid	2–1	CF Barcelona	Madrid
	Pirri 32'; Peinado 75'	Report	Saldua 19'	Stadium: Santiago Bernabeu; Referee: Alfredo Perales

24 November 1968 10	Pontevedra CF	0–0	Real Madrid	Pontevedra
		Report

30 November 1968 11	Real Madrid	2–1	Granada CF	Madrid
	Velazquez 9'; Grosso 56'	Report	Vicente 60'	Stadium: Santiago Bernabeu; Referee: Francisco Aguado

15 December 1968 13	Real Madrid	1–1	Elche CF	Madrid
	Pirri 47'	Report	5' Emilio	Stadium: Chamartín; Referee: Angel Barragan

18 December 1968 12	Real Zaragoza	1–1	Real Madrid	Zaragoza
	Planas 32'	Report	54' Gento	Stadium: La Romareda; Referee: Pedro Elordi

22 December 1968 14	CD Málaga	1–2	Real Madrid	Málaga
	Fluteas 29'	Report	Velazquez 27'; Velazquez 60'	Stadium: Estadio La Rosaleda; Referee: Agustin Alkturri

29 December 1969 15	Real Madrid	2–0	UD Las Palmas	Madrid
	Gento 44' (pen.); Peinado 46'	Report		Stadium: Santiago Bernabeu; Referee: Juan Garay

5 January 1969 16	Español	1–1	Real Madrid	Barcelona
	Wall 80'	Report	28' Amancio	Stadium: Estadio Sarriá; Referee: Mariano Iglesias

12 January 1969 17	Real Madrid	2–1	Deportivo La Coruña	Madrid
	Velazquez 6'; Gento 58' (pen.)	Report	56' Becky	Stadium: Santiago Bernabeu; Referee: Manuel Ruiz

19 January 1969 18	Córdoba CF	2–2	Real Madrid	Córdoba
	Jaen 36'; Rojas 37'	Report	56' Gento; 69' Zoco	Stadium: Los Carmenes; Referee: Daniel Isco

26 January 1969 19	Real Madrid	2–1	Athletic Bilbao	Madrid
	Amancio 38'; Grande 85'	Report	53' (o.g.) Betancourt	Stadium: Santiago Bernabeu; Referee: Agustin Alcturri

2 February 1969 20	CE Sabadell CF	0–0	Real Madrid	Sabadell
		Report		Referee: Francisco Sanchis

9 February 1969 21	Real Madrid	0–0	Valencia CF	Madrid
		Report		Stadium: Santiago Bernabeu; Referee: Pelayo Sancristobal

16 February 1969 22	Real Sociedad	0–2	Real Madrid	San Sebastián
		Report	Velazquez 38'; Perez 89'	Stadium: Atocha; Referee: Fernando Tejerina

2 March 1969 23	Real Madrid	0–0	Atlético Madrid	Madrid
		Report		Stadium: Chamartín; Referee: Adolfo Perales

9 March 1969 24	CF Barcelona	1–1	Real Madrid	Barcelona
	Saldua 26'	Report	87' (pen.) Gento	Stadium: Estadio del CF Barcelona; Referee: Jose Mendibil

16 March 1969 25	Real Madrid	2–2	Pontevedra CF	Madrid
	Gento 15' Amaro 32'	Report	8' Fuertes; 57' Barros	Stadium: Chamartín; Referee: Pablo Ibanez

23 March 1969 26	Granada CF	0–0	Real Madrid	Granada
		Report		Stadium: Los Carmenes; Referee: Francisco Sanchis

30 March 1969 27	Real Madrid	2–0	Real Zaragoza	Madrid
	Grosso 20'; Velazquez 49'	Report		Stadium: Chamartín; Referee: Francisco Aguado

14 April 1969 28	Elche CF	1–0	Real Madrid	Elche
	Curro 48'	Report		Stadium: Altabix; Referee: Mariano Iglesias

13 April 1969 29	Real Madrid	2–0	CD Málaga	Madrid
	Amaro 26'; Gento 73'	Report		Stadium: Santiago Bernabeu; Referee: Daniel Isco

20 April 1969 30	UD Las Palmas	0–1	Real Madrid	Las Palmas de Gran Canaria
		Report	85' Grande	Stadium: Estadio Insular; Referee: Antonio Rios

=== Copa del Generalísimo ===
==== Eightfinals ====
4 May 1969	Atlético Madrid	2–1	Real Madrid	Manzanares
	Calleja (red card) 45'; Ufarte 58'; Aragones 79'	Report	56' Gento	Stadium: Madrid; Referee: Pablo Ibanez

11 May 1969	Real Madrid	0–0	Atlético Madrid	Madrid
		Report		Stadium: Chamartín; Referee: Francisco Sanchis

=== European Cup ===
==== Preliminary round ====
18 September 1968	Real Madrid (Spain)	6–0	(Cyprus) AEL	Madrid
	Pirri 10', 14', 63'; Amancio 17'; Pérez 27'; Bueno 75'	Report		Stadium: Santiago Bernabéu Stadium, Attendance: 50,000; Referee: (Wales) William Gow

26 September 1968	AEL (Cyprus)	0–6	(Spain) Real Madrid	Madrid
		Report	Velázquez 7', 10'; José Luis 9'; Veloso 84'; Ortega 86'; Zunzunegui 87'	Stadium: Santiago Bernabéu Stadium, Attendance: 20,075; Referee: (Portugal) Aníbal da Silva Oliveira

==== Eightfinals ====
20 November 1968	Rapid Wien (Austria)	1–0	(Spain) Real Madrid	Vienna
	Kaltenbrunner 55'	Report		Stadium: Praterstadion, Attendance: 44,800; Referee: Josip Drago Horvat (Yugoslavia)

4 December 1968	Real Madrid (Spain)	2–1 (2–2a agg.)	(Austria) Rapid Wien	Madrid
	Velázquez 41'; Pirri 83'	Report	Bjerregaard 48'	Stadium: Santiago Bernabéu Stadium, Attendance: 90,000; Referee: (Switzerland) Gilbert Droz

== Statistics ==
=== Players statistics ===
No.	Pos	Nat	Player	Total		Primera Division		Copa		European Cup	
No.	Pos	Nat	Player	Apps	Goals	Apps	Goals	Apps	Goals	Apps	Goals
	GK	(Spain) ESP	Betancort	35	-25	30	-21	2	-2	3	-2
	DF	(Spain) ESP	De Felipe	36	0	30	0	2	0	4	0
	DF	(Spain) ESP	Sanchis	34	0	29	0	2	0	3	0
	DF	(Spain) ESP	José Luis	25	7	21	6	1	0	3	1
	DF	(Spain) ESP	Calpe	30	0	25	0	2	0	3	0
	MF	(Spain) ESP	Pirri	28	7	23	3	2	0	3	4
	MF	(Spain) ESP	Zoco	27	1	23	1	2	0	2	0
	MF	(Spain) ESP	Velazquez	35	10	30	7	2	0	3	3
	FW	(Spain) ESP	Amancio	32	15	29	14	1	0	2	1
	FW	(Spain) ESP	Grosso	29	3	25	3	2	0	2	0
	FW	(Spain) ESP	Gento	30	9	26	8	2	1	2	0
	GK	(Spain) ESP	Junquera	1	0	0	0	0	0	1	0
	DF	(Spain) ESP	Zunzunegui	16	1	12	0	0	0	4	1
	FW	(Argentina) ARG	Pérez	15	2	12	1	1	0	2	1
	FW	(Spain) ESP	Bueno	11	1	7	0	0	0	4	1
	DF	(Spain) ESP	Grande	6	2	5	2	1	0	0	0
	FW	(Spain) ESP	Veloso	5	2	3	1	0	0	2	1
	DF	(Spain) ESP	Miera	4	0	2	0	0	0	2	0
	DF	(Spain) ESP	Babiloni	4	0	2	0	0	0	2	0
	MF	(Spain) ESP	Vidal	2	0	2	0				
	MF	(Spain) ESP	González	0	0	0	0				
	DF	(Spain) ESP	De Diego	0	0	0	0				

- Source: http://www.bdfutbol.com/en/t/t1968-692.html

== See also ==
- Yé-yé (Real Madrid)
