= 1964–65 Real Madrid CF season =

62nd season in existence of Real Madrid CF

Real Madrid CF
1964–65 season
- President: Santiago Bernabéu
- Head coach: Miguel Muñoz
- Stadium: Chamartín
- La Liga: 1st (in European Cup)
- Copa del Generalísimo: Round of 16
- European Cup: Quarter-finals
- Top goalscorer: Ramón Grosso (17)
Home colours	Away colours

The 1964–65 season was Real Madrid Club de Fútbol's 62nd season in existence and the club's 33rd consecutive season in the top flight of Spanish football.

== Summary ==
The club clinched its 11th League title four points above runners-up Atlético Madrid and five championship in a row a record remained until 1990 when the club won again the same consecutive trophies. Defensive line was crucial for the title allowing only 18 goals against, instead of an attacking style played by the team in last seasons. New Spanish arrivals for the squad were taking form into the club: from UD Las Palmas goalkeeper Antonio Betancort, from Granada CF 19-yrs-old midfielder Pirri (playing his match debut in the campaign against FC Barcelona replacing suspended Puskas), forwards Grosso, Serena (replacing ageing Puskas) and youngstar defender Manuel Sanchis.

In Copa del Generalísimo, the club was eliminated by Atlético Madrid in the round of 16 after a 0–4 away defeat. Meanwhile, in the European Cup the squad was reached the quarter-finals where it defeated by Portuguese side Benfica 3–6 on aggregate (including a 1–5 loss in Lisbon).

== Squad ==
Note: Flags indicate national team as defined under FIFA eligibility rules; some limited exceptions apply. Players may hold more than one non-FIFA nationality.

No.	Pos.	Nation	Player
—	GK	ESP	Antonio Betancort
—	DF	ESP	Vicente Miera
—	DF	ESP	Ignacio Zoco
—	MD	TUN	Ridha Bouraoui
—	DF	ESP	Pachín
—	MF	FRA	Lucien Muller
—	MF	ESP	Pirri
—	FW	ESP	Ramón Grosso
—	FW	ESP	Francisco Gento
—	FW	ESP	Amancio Amaro
—	FW	HUN	Ferenc Puskás

No.	Pos.	Nation	Player
—	GK	ESP	José Araquistáin
—	FW	ESP	Fernando Serena
—	MF	ESP	Félix Ruiz
—	DF	ESP	Manuel Sanchís
—	FW	ESP	Manolín Bueno
—	DF	ESP	Pedro de Felipe
—	MF	ESP	Felo
—	MF	ESP	Pipi Suarez
—	DF	ESP	Isidro
—	MF	ESP	Santos Bedoya López
—	FW	ESP	Emilio Morollón

=== Transfers ===
In
Pos.	Name	From	Type
MF	Pirri	Granada	-
DF	Manuel Sanchís	Real Valladolid	-
GK	Beltran	-	-
MF	Ridha bourawi	Espanyol	-
FW	Morollon	Valladolid	-

Out
Pos.	Name	To	Type
FW	Alfredo Di Stefano	RCD Espanyol	-
MF	Santisteban	-	-
GK	Vicente	Mallorca	-
FW	Robles	CD Malaga	-
DF	Maestro	Murcia	-
DF	Echarri	Valladolid	-
DF	Corcuera	-	-
DF	Jose Luis	-	-
FW	Sorribas	-	-
FW	Yanko	Atletico	-

== Competitions ==
=== La Liga ===
==== League table ====
Pos	Team	Pld	W	D	L	GF	GA	GD	Pts	Qualification or relegation
1	Real Madrid (C)	30	21	5	4	64	18	+46	47	Qualification for the European Cup preliminary round
2	Atlético Madrid	30	20	3	7	58	27	+31	43	Qualification for the Cup Winners' Cup first round (Note: Atlético Madrid qualified to the Cup Winners' Cup as champions of the Copa del Generalísimo.)
3	Zaragoza	30	19	2	9	60	37	+23	40	Invited for the Inter-Cities Fairs Cup
4	Valencia	30	17	4	9	59	37	+22	38	Invited for the Inter-Cities Fairs Cup
5	Córdoba	30	16	3	11	36	34	+2	35	

Source: BDFútbol
Rules for classification: 1) Points; 2) Head-to-head results; 3) Goal difference; 4) Number of goals scored
(C) Champions

==== Position by round ====
Round	1	2	3	4	5	6	7	8	9	10	11	12	13	14	15	16	17	18	19	20	21	22	23	24	25	26	27	28	29	30
Ground	A	H	H	A	H	A	H	A	H	A	H	A	H	A	H	H	A	A	H	A	H	A	H	A	H	A	H	A	H	A
Result	W	W	W	D	W	D	D	L	W	W	W	W	W	D	W	W	D	L	W	W	W	L	W	W	L	W	W	W	W	W
Position	4	1	1	3	2	2	2	3	2	1	1	1	1	1	1	1	1	1	1	1	1	2	1	1	2	2	1	1	1	1

Source: www.lfp.es
A = Away; H = Home; W = Win; D = Draw; L = Loss; = Leader, 1965-66 European Cup

==== Matches ====
13 September 1964 1	Español	1–2	Real Madrid	Barcelona
	Ramírez 17'	Report	Puskás 2'; Puskás 84'	Stadium: Sarrià; Referee: Bueno Perales

19 September 1964 2	Real Madrid	6–0	UD Las Palmas	Madrid
	Amancio 1'; Amancio (red card) 22'; Puskás 27'; Grosso 43'; Pipi Suárez 55'; Gento 82'; Puskás 87'	Report	Ulacia 51'; Aparicio (red card) 22'	Stadium: Chamartín; Referee: Ortiz de Mendibil

27 September 1964 3	Real Madrid	6–1	Córdoba CF	Madrid
	Grosso 1'; Puskás 17'; Betancort 18'; Serena 43'; Grosso 54'; Puskás 60'; Grosso 88'	Report	Tejada 86'	Stadium: Chamartín; Referee: Zariquiegui Izco

4 October 1964 4	Elche CF	1–1	Real Madrid	Elche
	Romero 45'	Report	Félix Ruiz 67'	Stadium: Campo de Altabix; Referee: Gómez Arribas

11 October 1964 5	Real Madrid	3–0	Real Oviedo	Madrid
	Félix Ruiz 28'; Gento 53'; Grosso 60'	Report		Stadium: Chamartín; Referee: Cerezuela Ruiz

18 October 1964 6	Valencia CF	0–0	Real Madrid	Valencia
		Report		Stadium: Mestalla; Referee: Bueno Perales

25 October 1964 7	Real Madrid	1–1	Real Zaragoza	Madrid
	Félix Ruiz 46'; Araquistáin 77'	Report	Villa 6'	Stadium: Chamartín

1 November 1964 8	Real Betis	3–1	Real Madrid	Seville
	Ansola 45'; Molina 55'; Ansola 72'	Report	Morollón 47'; Puskás (red card) 65'; Morollón 80'	Stadium: Estadio Benito Villamarin; Referee: Lloris Antonino

8 November 1964 9	Real Madrid	4–1	FC Barcelona	Madrid
	Amancio 16'; Amancio 31'; Amancio 74'; Fernando Serena 76'	Report	Cayetano Ré 68'	Stadium: Estadio Santiago Bernabéu; Referee: Zariquiegui Izco

22 November 1964 10	Atlético Madrid	0–1	Real Madrid	Madrid
	Collar (penalty missed) 75'	Report	65'Grosso; Felo (red card) 75'	Stadium: Metropolitano; Referee: Bueno Perales

28 November 1964 11	Real Madrid	2–0	Deportivo La Coruña	Madrid
	Grosso 9'; Pirri 68'	Report		Stadium: Chamartín; Referee: Tomás López

6 December 1964 12	Real Murcia	1–2	Real Madrid	Murcia
	Martínez 58'	Report	Zoco 30'; Grosso 39'	Stadium: La Condomina; Referee: Pintado Viu

13 December 1964 13	Real Madrid	4–1	Levante UD	Madrid
	Amancio 9'; Grosso 18'; Pirri 27'; Amancio 81'	Report	Rivera 58'	Stadium: Chamartín; Referee: Gonzalbez

20 December 1964 14	Athletic Bilbao	1–1	Real Madrid	Bilbao
	Arieta 55'	Report	Amancio 74'	Stadium: San Mamés; Referee: Oliva Fortuny

27 December 1964 15	Real Madrid	4–0	Sevilla CF	Madrid
	Grosso 22'; Grosso 46'; Grosso 53'; Serena 82'	Report	Mut 4'	Stadium: Chamartín; Referee: Bueno Perales

3 January 1965 16	Real Madrid	1–0	Español	Madrid
	Pirri 45'	Report	Ramirez 70'	Stadium: Chamartín; Referee: Izco

10 January 1965 17	UD Las Palmas	1–1	Real Madrid	Las Palmas
	Gilberto 16'	Report	Grosso 8'	Stadium: Estadio Insular; Referee: Ortiz de Mendibil

17 January 1965 18	Córdoba CF	1–0	Real Madrid	Córdoba
	Tejada 35'	Report	Felix Ruiz78'	Stadium: Estadio El Arcángel; Referee: Izco

24 January 1965 19	Real Madrid	3–0	Elche CF	Madrid
	Gento 34' (pen.); Pirri 37'; Pirri 87'	Report	Pazos 87'	Stadium: Chamartín; Referee: Oliva Fortuny

31 January 1965 20	Real Oviedo	0–1	Real Madrid	Oviedo
		Report	Pirri 79'	Stadium: Carlos Tartiere; Referee: Cerezuela Ruiz

7 February 1965 21	Real Madrid	3–0	Valencia CF	Madrid
	Gento 23'; Amancio 39'; Puskás 63'	Report		Stadium: Chamartín; Referee: Pintado Viu

14 February 1965 22	Real Zaragoza	1–0	Real Madrid	Zaragoza
	Villa 45'	Report		Stadium: Estadio La Romareda; Referee: Lopez Zaballa

20 February 1965 23	Real Madrid	6–1	Real Betis	Madrid
	Félix Ruiz 10'; Serena 24'; Amancio 26'; Grosso 35'; Miera 59'; Serena 62'	Report	Azcárate 75'	Stadium: Chamartín; Referee: Ruiz Alciturri

28 February 1965 24	FC Barcelona	1–2	Real Madrid	Barcelona
	Cayetano Ré 40'	Report	Pirri 63'; Fernando Serena 70'	Stadium: Camp Nou; Referee: Cerezuela Ruiz

7 March 1965 25	Real Madrid	0–1	Atlético Madrid	Madrid
		Report	Mendonça 74'	Stadium: Chamartín; Referee: Oliva Fortuny

21 March 1965 26	Deportivo La Coruña	0–2	Real Madrid	A Coruña
	Benegas20'	Report	Pirri 20'; Grosso 72'	Stadium: Estadio Riazor

28 March 1965 27	Real Madrid	4–1	Real Murcia	Madrid
	Puskás 20'; Pirri 33'; Grosso 69'; Puskás 73' (pen.)	Report	Arce 8'	Stadium: Chamartín; Referee: Medina Iglesias

4 April 1965 28	Levante UD	0–1	Real Madrid	Valencia
		Report	71'Grosso	Stadium: Estadio de Vallejo; Referee: Ortiz de Mendibil

26 April 1965 29	Real Madrid	1–0	Athletic Bilbao	Madrid
	Puskás 13' (pen.)	Report		Stadium: Chamartín; Referee: Birigay Nieva

18 April 1965 30	Sevilla CF	0–1	Real Madrid	Seville
		Report	Puskás 68'	Stadium: Estadio Sanchez Pizjuan; Referee: Zariquiegui Izco

=== Copa del Generalísimo ===
==== Round of 32 ====
24 April 1965	Mestalla	2–1	Real Madrid
		Report

16 May 1965	Real Madrid	6–0	Mestalla	Madrid
		Report		Stadium: Chamartín

==== Eightfinals ====
23 May 1965	Real Madrid	1–0	Atlético Madrid	Madrid
		Report		Stadium: Chamartín

30 May 1965	Atlético Madrid	4–0	Real Madrid	Madrid
		Report		Stadium: Metropolitano

=== European Cup ===
==== Preliminary round ====
23 September 1964	Boldklubben 1909 (Denmark)	2–5	(Spain) Real Madrid	Odense
	Richter 15'; Danielsen 85'	Report	Gento 3', 41', 65'; Grosso 29'; Puskás 70'	Stadium: Odense Stadion; Attendance: 18,139; Referee: (England) Kenneth Dagnall

14 October 1964	Real Madrid (Spain)	4–0	(Denmark) Boldklubben 1909	Madrid
	Gento 9', 87'; Grosso 28'; Amancio 78'	Report		Stadium: Santiago Bernabéu Stadium; Attendance: 70,000; Referee: (France) Marcel Bois

==== Eightfinals ====
18 November 1964	Real Madrid (Spain)	4–0	(Czechoslovakia) Dukla Prague	Madrid
	Amancio 23', 76', 85'; Grosso 33'	Report		Stadium: Santiago Bernabéu Stadium; Attendance: 100,000; Referee: (Belgium) Joseph Hannet

2 December 1964	Dukla Prague (Czechoslovakia)	2–2	(Spain) Real Madrid	Prague
	Geleta 60', 75'	Report	Felo 14'; Amancio 87'	Stadium: Strahov Stadium; Attendance: 39,290; Referee: (Poland) Aleksander Goraczniak

==== Quarter-finals ====
24 February 1965	Benfica (Portugal)	5–1	(Spain) Real Madrid	Lisbon
	José Augusto 9'; Eusébio 13', 25'; Simões 75'; Coluna 88'	Report	Amancio 56'	Stadium: Estádio da Luz, Attendance: 64,256; Referee: (England) Kevin Howley

17 March 1965	Real Madrid (Spain)	2–1	(Portugal) Benfica	Madrid
	Grosso 10'; Puskás 70'	Report	Eusébio 41'	Stadium: Santiago Bernabéu Stadium; Attendance: 100,000; Referee: (Scotland) Hugh Phillips

== Statistics ==
=== Players statistics ===
No.	Pos	Nat	Player	Total		Primera Division		Copa del Generalisimo		European Cup	
No.	Pos	Nat	Player	Apps	Goals	Apps	Goals	Apps	Goals	Apps	Goals
	GK	(Spain) ESP	Betancort	34	-30	25	-14	4	-6	5	-10
	DF	(Spain) ESP	Miera	37	1	28	1	4	0	5	0
	DF	(Uruguay) URU	Santamaria	36	0	27	0	4	0	5	0
	DF	(Spain) ESP	Pachín	33	0	25	0	3	0	5	0
	MF	(Spain) ESP	Pirri	28	10	21	9	3	1	4	0
	MF	(France) FRA	Muller	30	0	26	0	0	0	4	0
	MF	(Spain) ESP	Zoco	38	1	29	1	3	0	6	0
	MF	(Spain) ESP	Gento	32	9	23	4	3	0	6	5
	FW	(Spain) ESP	Amancio	27	15	22	9	0	0	5	6
	FW	(Hungary) HUN	Puskas	25	17	18	11	4	4	3	2
	FW	(Spain) ESP	Grosso	37	23	28	17	4	2	5	4
	GK	(Spain) ESP	Araquistain	8	-4	7	-4	0	0	1	0
	FW	(Spain) ESP	Serena	24	7	18	6	3	1	3	0
	MF	(Spain) ESP	Ruiz	15	4	11	4	2	0	2	0
	DF	(Spain) ESP	Sanchis	11	0	5	0	4	0	2	0
	FW	(Spain) ESP	Bueno	4	0	4	0				
	DF	(Spain) ESP	De Felipe	5	0	4	0	0	0	1	0
	MF	(Spain) ESP	Felo	7	0	4	0	1	0	2	0
	MF	(Spain) ESP	Pipi Suarez	4	1	3	1	0	0	1	0
	DF	(Spain) ESP	Isidro	2	0	1	0	0	0	1	0
	MF	(Spain) ESP	Bedoya	1	0	1	0				
	FW	(Spain) ESP	Morollon	1	1	1	1				

- Source: http://www.bdfutbol.com/en/t/t1964-652.html
