= Fidel Uriarte =

Spanish footballer and manager (1945–2016)

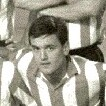
- Uriarte with Athletic Bilbao in 1965

Personal information
- Full name: Fidel Uriarte Macho
- Date of birth: 1 March 1945
- Place of birth: Sestao, Spain
- Date of death: 19 December 2016 (aged 71)
- Place of death: Castro Urdiales, Spain
- Height: 1.75 m (5 ft 9 in)
- Position: Striker

Youth career
- 1960–1962: Athletic Bilbao

Senior career*
| Years | Team | Apps | (Gls) |
| 1962–1974 | Athletic Bilbao | 297 | (90) |
| 1974–1977 | Málaga | 46 | (1) |
| Total | | 343 | (91) |

International career
| 1962–1963 | Spain U18 | 5 | (0) |
| 1967–1970 | Spain U23 | 4 | (1) |
| 1963–1964 | Spain amateur | 7 | (5) |
| 1968–1972 | Spain | 9 | (1) |

Managerial career
- 1978: Sestao
- 1990–1991: Athletic Bilbao (assistant)
- 1991: Bilbao Athletic
- 1991–1992: Athletic Bilbao (assistant)
- 1992–1993: Athletic Bilbao (youth)
- 1993–1994: Bilbao Athletic (youth)
- 1995: Villarreal
- * Club domestic league appearances and goals

Fidel Uriarte Macho (1 March 1945 – 19 December 2016) was a Spanish professional footballer who played as a striker.

Having spent most of his 15-year career with Athletic Bilbao, he was crowned La Liga's Pichichi in 1968, winning two Copa del Rey and scoring more than 100 official goals with his main club.

== Club career ==
Born in Sestao, Biscay, Uriarte was promoted to Basque giants Athletic Bilbao's first team at only 17, making his La Liga debut on 23 September 1962 in a 2–0 away loss against CD Málaga. At the end of his fourth season, aged 21, he had already appeared in 100 league matches and scored 14 goals.

Uriarte scored a career-best 22 goals in only 24 league games (35/28 overall) in the 1967–68 campaign, helping Athletic to finish in seventh place; on 31 December 1967, he contributed five to an 8–0 home demolition of Real Betis. In the following year he conquered the first of his two Copa del Rey with the club, and left in 1974 with 389 competitive appearances and 121 goals.

In 1974, Uriarte joined Málaga. In his time with the Andalusian side, they were promoted once and relegated twice. He often played as a sweeper, and retired in 1977 at the age of 32.

Uriarte worked as a coach in the following decades, managing both Athletic's reserve and youth sides amongst others.

== International career ==
Uriarte earned nine caps for Spain in four years, his debut coming on 28 February 1968 in a friendly with Sweden in Seville. In another exhibition game, a 2–1 away win over Italy on 20 February 1971, he scored his only goal.

=== International goals ===
| # | Date | Venue | Opponent | Score | Result | Competition |
|---|---|---|---|---|---|---|
| 1. | 20 February 1971 | Sant'Elia, Cagliari, Italy | Italy | 0–2 | 1–2 | Friendly |

== Personal life and death ==
Uriarte's younger brother, Gabriel, was also a footballer. A forward, he was mainly a reserve player at Valencia CF.

On 19 December 2016, Uriarte died in Castro Urdiales, Bay of Biscay, after a long illness. He was 71 years old.

== Honours ==
Athletic Bilbao

- Copa del Generalísimo: 1969, 1972–73

Individual

- Pichichi Trophy: 1967–68
