= Paco Gento =

Spanish footballer (1933–2022)

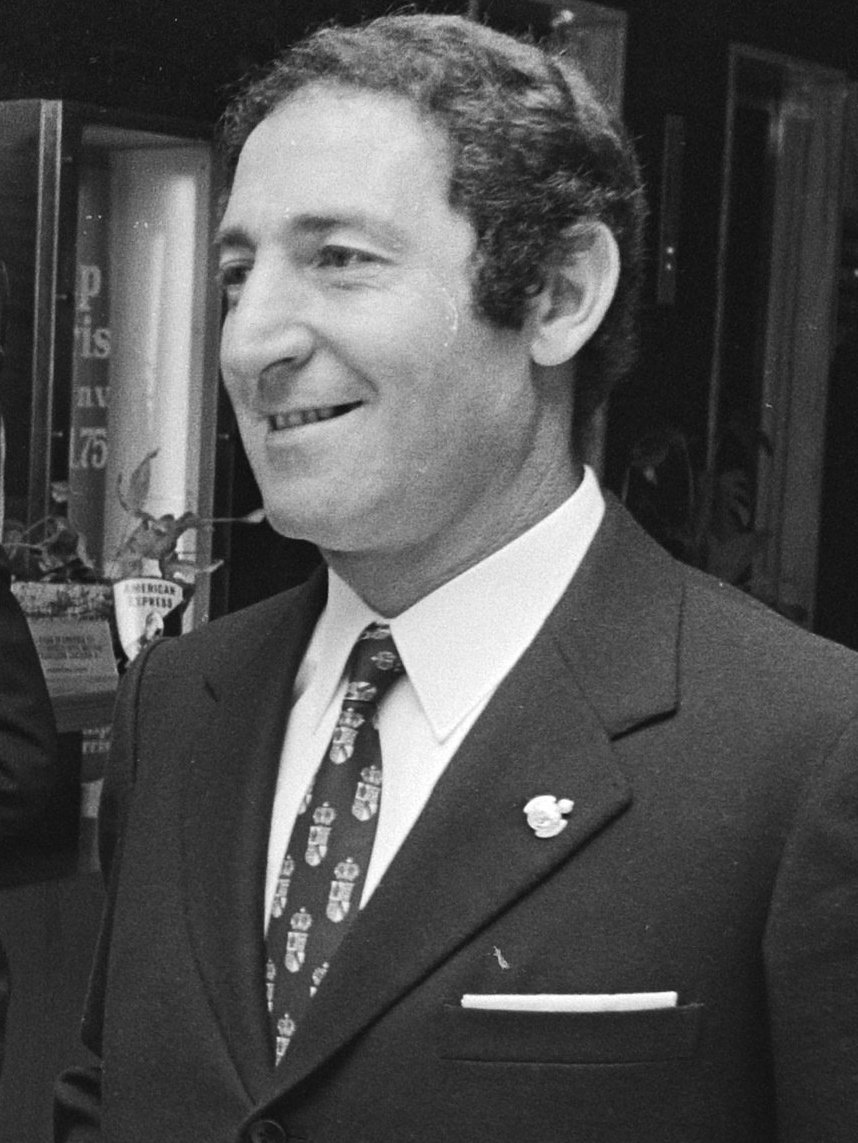
- Gento in 1971

Personal information
- Full name: Francisco Gento López
- Date of birth: 21 October 1933
- Place of birth: Guarnizo, Spain
- Date of death: 18 January 2022 (aged 88)
- Place of death: Madrid, Spain
- Height: 1.68 m (5 ft 6 in)
- Position: Outside left

Youth career
- SD Nueva Montaña
- Unión Club Astillero
- Rayo Cantabria

Senior career*
Years	Team	Apps	(Gls)
1952–1953	Racing Santander	10	(2)
1953–1971	Real Madrid	427	(127)
Total		437	(129)

International career
1956	Spain B	1	(0)
1955–1969	Spain	43	(5)

Managerial career
- Real Madrid Castilla
- 1974: Castellón
- 1977–1980: Palencia
- 1980–1981: Granada
- 1997–2000: Cantabria
- * Club domestic league appearances and goals

Francisco "Paco" Gento López (21 October 1933 – 18 January 2022) was a Spanish footballer who played as an outside left. A fast runner, Gento was referred to as the "Gale of the Cantabrian Sea" (Spanish: La Galerna del Cantábrico) in reference to his speed down the wing. He was voted by IFFHS (International Federation of Football History and Statistics) as the greatest Spanish footballer and 30th greatest world footballer of the 20th century. Gento is also widely regarded as one of the greatest wingers in the history of the sport.

Gento began his career at Racing Santander in 1952 and moved to Real Madrid the following season. He appeared in a joint record eight European Cup finals, winning a joint record six, as well as winning a record 12 La Liga titles. In a 14-year international career, Gento earned 43 caps for Spain, playing at the World Cup in 1962 and 1966.

Following the death of Alfredo Di Stéfano in 2014, Gento was appointed the Honorary President of Real Madrid.

== Club career ==
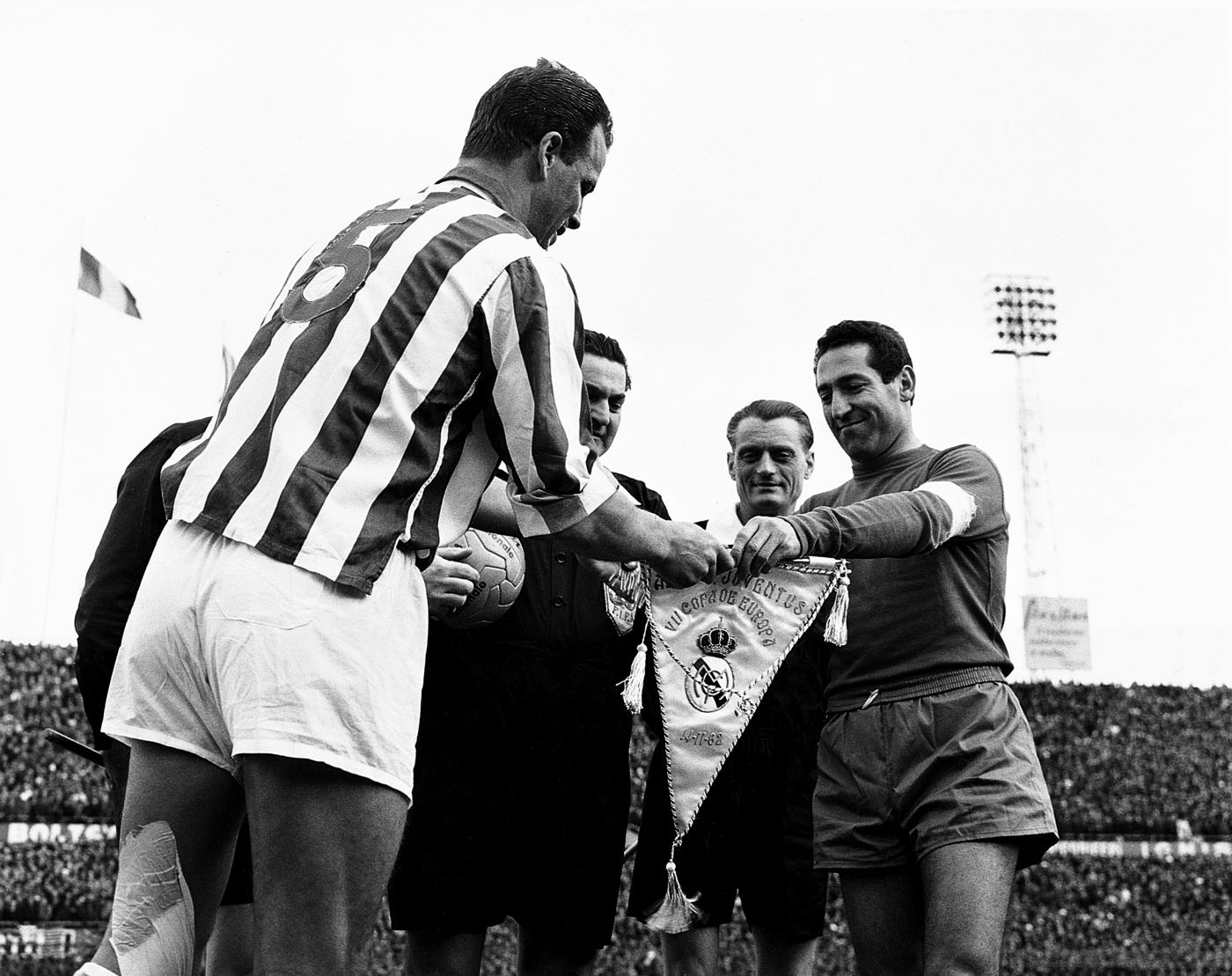
Gento (right) and John Charles of Juventus exchange pennants before their European Cup clash in 1962.

Gento debuted in the Primera División with Racing Santander in the 1952–53 season. He was still playing mostly for the B team at Santander when a flu virus saw him promoted to the first team ahead of a home game against Real Madrid. Such was his performance in the match, that Madrid signed him three days later.

La Galerna del Cantábrico (The Gale of the Cantabrian Sea), as he was known, played outside left and was noted for his exceptional pace, his skills with the ball and his scoring prowess from the midfield position. Gento captained Real Madrid from 1962 until his retirement in 1971 and was the leader of the young side known in Spain as Ye-yé. The nickname "Yé-yé" reflected the team's association with the youth culture of the 1960s, popularized by the rise of musical groups such as The Beatles.

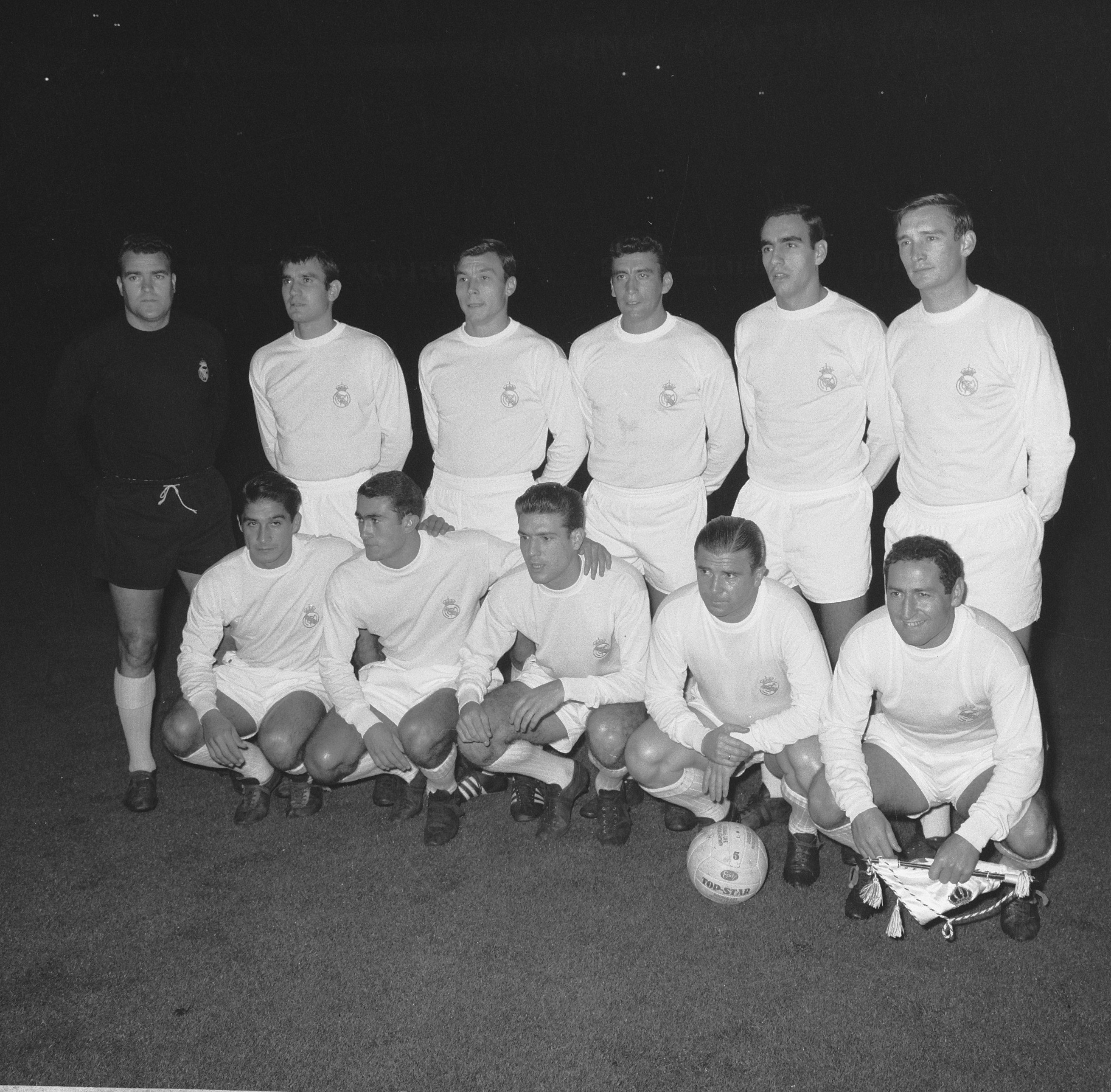
Gento, first from the right, front row, with Los Blancos in 1965.

Gento did not score in his first season and was under pressure from club president Santiago Bernabéu. The president was won over by Di Stéfano's argument "he is quick and hits the ball like a cannon. That can't be learned, it's innate. We can teach him the rest". Among other honors, Gento won the European Cup a record six times with Real Madrid between 1955 and 1966 being the only Madrid player to figure in all of the wins (a record since equalled by Nacho, Luka Modrić and Dani Carvajal). He contributed with 31 goals in 88 European Cup career matches.

Gento played in eight European Cup finals, with a 6–2 record, and he also appeared in a ninth European final appearance in the 1970–1971 Cup Winners' Cup final that Real Madrid lost to Chelsea. He holds this record jointly with Milan's Paolo Maldini, who has an inferior 5–3 record. Gento's legendary Real Madrid teammate, Alfredo Di Stéfano's 5–2 record comes third. Domestically, Gento collected 12 La Liga titles during his time with Madrid. He scored 128 times in 428 league appearances for the club, a strong return for a winger, especially as he was often providing goals for teammates Di Stéfano and Puskás. He won 23 trophies for the club, which remained an outright record until equalled by Marcelo days before Gento's death.

After he retired from football in 1971, he coached various lower-league teams, such as Castilla, Castellón, Palencia, and Granada. In 1978–79, he led Palencia to promotion to the Segunda División for the first time in their history. He later took up a role as an ambassador for Real Madrid throughout Europe, alongside Di Stéfano. After Di Stéfano died in 2014, Gento became the honorary president of the club.

== International career ==
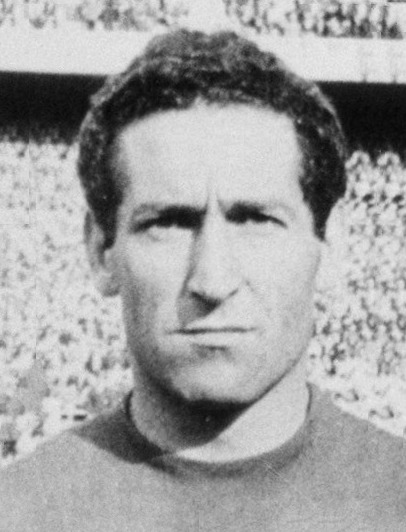
Gento with Spain in 1962

Gento played for the Spain national team from 1955 to 1969, winning 43 caps and scoring five times. His debut came on 18 May 1955 in a 1–1 draw with England in Madrid. He was initially known as "La tercera G" (the third G) for succeeding Agustín Gaínza and Guillermo Gorostiza in his position. His rival for his position was his friend Enrique Collar of Atlético Madrid, and the pair played together at the 1962 FIFA World Cup in Chile.

In 1964 European Nations' Cup qualification, Gento was included alongside Collar under new manager José Villalonga, but was dropped after a home defeat to Belgium on 1 December 1963; Carlos Lapetra took his place for the finals which Spain won. Due to improved form and fitness in the second half of the 1965–66 season, he was recalled for the 1966 FIFA World Cup in England, playing all three games of a group-stage elimination.

Shortly before turning 36, Gento was given his 43rd and final cap on 15 October 1969 by his former teammate László Kubala, in a 6–0 win over already eliminated Finland in 1970 FIFA World Cup qualification. He ended short of the record of 46 caps by Ricardo Zamora.

== Personal life and death ==
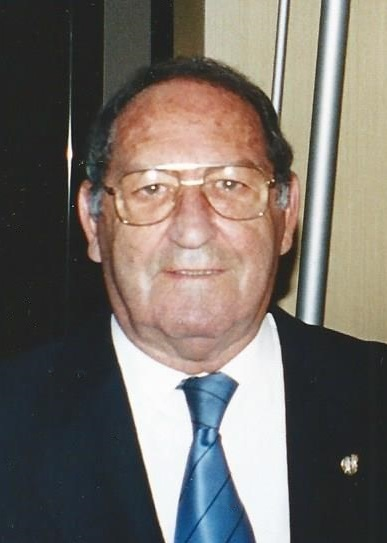
Gento in 2005

Gento's two younger brothers, Julio (1939–2016) and Antonio (1940–2020) also played football professionally; the latter played for Real Madrid, too, but they were not as successful as their older brother Francisco.

His nephews were also athletes – José Luis Llorente and Toñín Llorente (es) played basketball, whilst Paco Llorente and Julio Llorente were footballers. Grand-nephew Marcos Llorente, son of Paco Llorente, is also a footballer.

Gento died in his sleep on 18 January 2022, at the age of 88.

Real Madrid announced in a statement that "he will always be remembered by Madridistas and all football fans as one of their greatest." FIFA President Gianni Infantino said, “One of the greatest players of his generation, Paco leaves behind a lifetime of memories for all fans of football, but especially those of Spain and Real Madrid.”

== Legacy ==
"Regarded as one of the greatest Spanish players of all time and one of the greatest ever players in his position, Gento was an extremely fast left winger, which made him an effective assist provider with high accuracy in his crosses."

== Career statistics ==
=== Club ===
Appearances and goals by club, season and competition
Club	Season	League			Copa del Rey		Europe (Note: All appearances in European Cup, unless otherwise noted)		Other		Total	
Club	Season	Division	Apps	Goals	Apps	Goals	Apps	Goals	Apps	Goals	Apps	Goals
Racing Santander	1952–53	Primera División	10	2	4	1	—		—		14	3
Real Madrid	1953–54	Primera División	17	0	4	0	—		—		21	0
Real Madrid	1954–55	Primera División	24	6	3	0	—		2 (Note: Appearances in Latin Cup)	0	29	6
Real Madrid	1955–56	Primera División	29	7	6	3	7	1	—		42	11
Real Madrid	1956–57	Primera División	27	7	3	0	8	1	2	3	40	11
Real Madrid	1957–58	Primera División	28	7	5	1	6	3	—		39	11
Real Madrid	1958–59	Primera División	21	7	4	2	8	1	—		33	10
Real Madrid	1959–60	Primera División	27	15	5	3	6	2	—		38	20
Real Madrid	1960–61	Primera División	28	9	8	3	2	1	1 (Note: Appearance in Intercontinental Cup)	1	39	14
Real Madrid	1961–62	Primera División	25	6	9	4	10	2	—		44	12
Real Madrid	1962–63	Primera División	25	7	4	1	2	1	—		31	9
Real Madrid	1963–64	Primera División	24	12	2	0	9	3	—		35	15
Real Madrid	1964–65	Primera División	23	4	3	0	6	5	—		32	9
Real Madrid	1965–66	Primera División	28	10	3	2	9	3	—		40	15
Real Madrid	1966–67	Primera División	20	11	5	0	4	0	1	0	30	11
Real Madrid	1967–68	Primera División	24	8	1	0	7	5	—		32	13
Real Madrid	1968–69	Primera División	26	8	2	1	2	0	—		30	9
Real Madrid	1969–70	Primera División	24	3	4	1	3	2	—		31	6
Real Madrid	1970–71	Primera División	7	0	2	0	6 (Note: Appearances in European Cup Winners' Cup)	0	—		15	0
Real Madrid	Total		427	127	73	21	95	30	6	4	601	182
Career total			437	129	77	22	95	30	6	4	615	185

=== International ===
Appearances and goals by national team and year
National team	Year	Apps	Goals
Spain	1955	1	0
Spain	1956	1	0
Spain	1957	7	0
Spain	1958	2	0
Spain	1959	5	1
Spain	1960	4	0
Spain	1961	7	1
Spain	1962	6	0
Spain	1963	3	1
Spain	1966	3	1
Spain	1967	2	1
Spain	1968	2	0
Spain	1969	1	0
Total		44	5

Scores and results list Spain's goal tally first, score column indicates score after each Gento goal.

List of international goals scored by Francisco Gento
No.	Date	Venue	Opponent	Score	Result	Competition
1	14 October 1959	Santiago Bernabéu Stadium, Madrid, Spain	Poland	3–0	3–0	1960 European Nations' Cup qualifying
2	2 April 1961	Santiago Bernabéu Stadium, Madrid, Spain	France	2–0	2–0	Friendly
3	30 October 1963	Windsor Park, Belfast, Northern Ireland	Northern Ireland	1–0	1–0	1964 European Nations' Cup qualifying
4	23 June 1966	Riazor, A Coruña, Spain	Uruguay	1–1	1–1	Friendly
5	31 May 1967	San Mamés, Bilbao, Spain	Turkey	2–0	2–0	UEFA Euro 1968 qualifying

== Honours ==
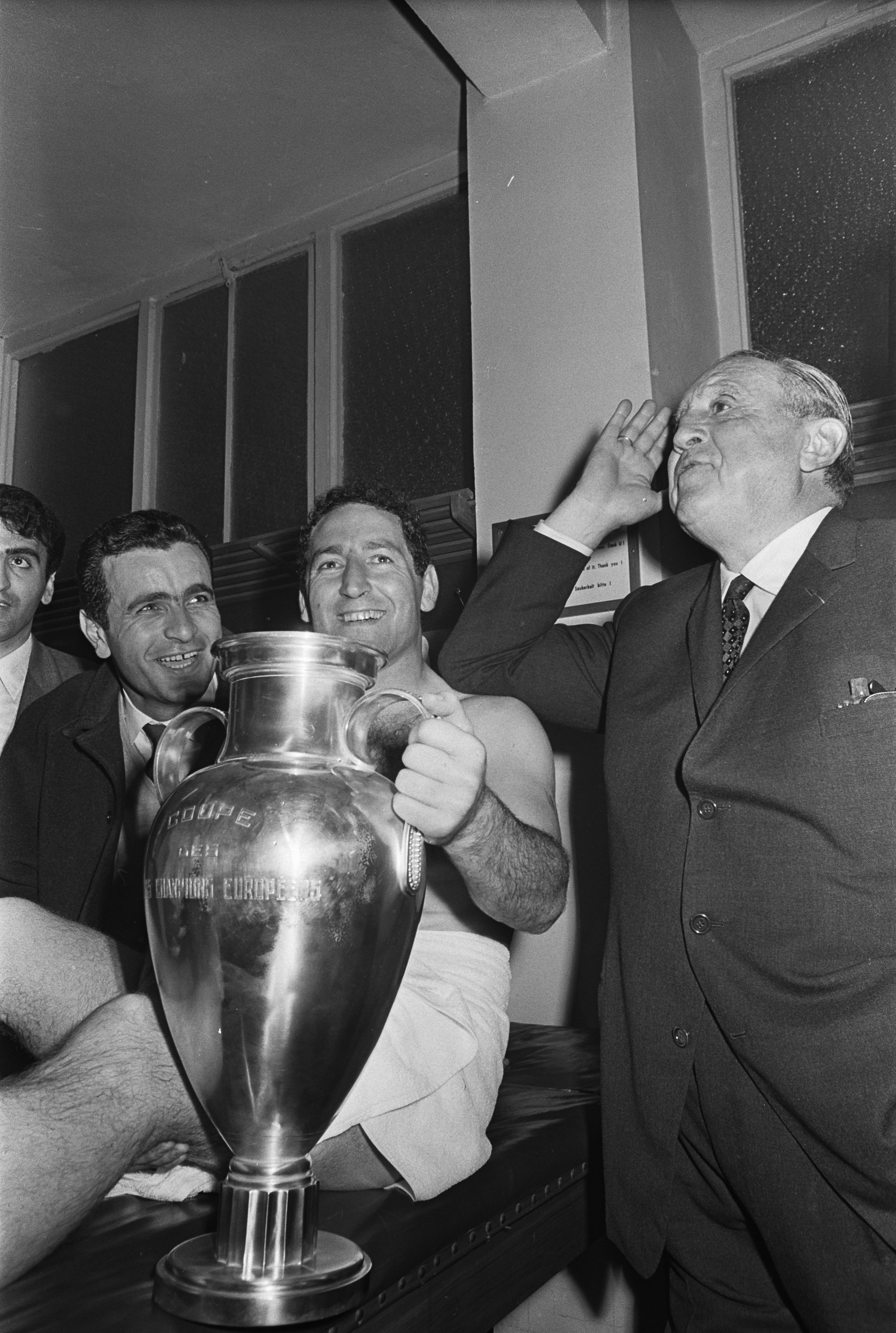
Gento holding the 1966 European Cup trophy, with Santiago Bernabéu to his right.

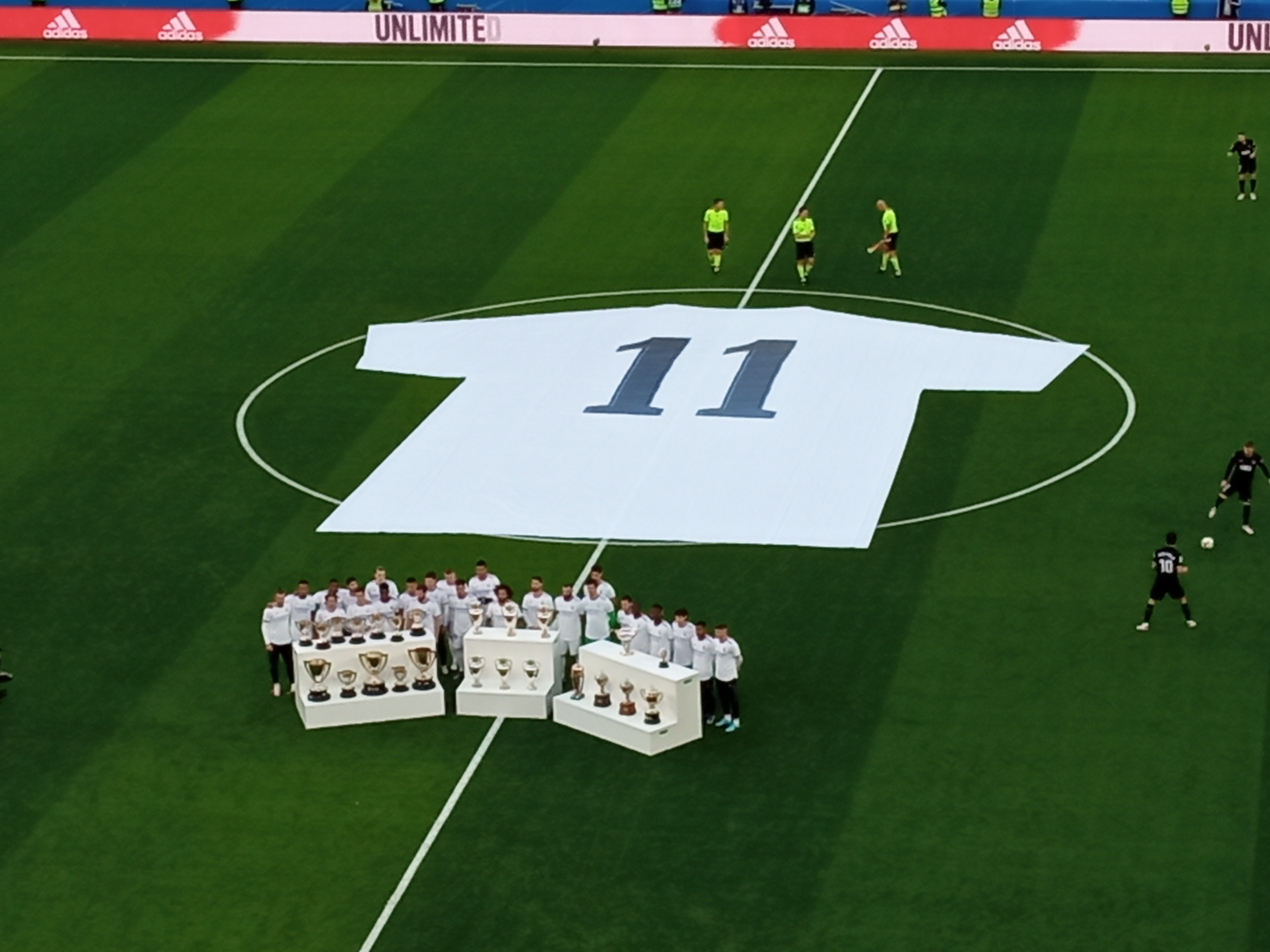
Real Madrid's tribute to Gento following his death, with a giant No. 11 jersey and the trophies he won with the club displayed on the pitch at the Bernabéu.

Real Madrid

- La Liga: 1953–54, 1954–55, 1956–57, 1957–58, 1960–61, 1961–62, 1962–63, 1963–64, 1964–65, 1966–67, 1967–68, 1968–69
- Copa del Generalísimo: 1961–62, 1969–70
- European Cup: 1955–56, 1956–57, 1957–58, 1958–59, 1959–60, 1965–66
- Latin Cup: 1955, 1957
- Intercontinental Cup: 1960

Non-official

- Small Club World Cup: 1956

Individual

- World XI: 1960, 1961, 1962
- Golden Foot Legends Award: 2004
- Marca Legend Award: 2007
- World Soccer: The 100 Greatest Footballers of All Time
- IFFHS Legends

Records

- Most La Liga titles: 12
- Most European Cup titles: 6 (tied with Dani Carvajal, Toni Kroos, Luka Modrić and Nacho)
- Most European Cup final appearances: 8 (tied with Paolo Maldini)

== See also ==
- List of La Liga players (400+ appearances)
- List of Real Madrid CF records and statistics
