= Fernand Goyvaerts =

Belgian footballer

- Goyvaerts with OGC Nice in 1970

Personal information
- Full name: Fernand August Goyvaerts Deyrdey
- Date of birth: 24 October 1938
- Place of birth: Mechelen, Belgium
- Date of death: 5 April 2004 (aged 65)
- Place of death: Bruges, Belgium
- Position: Forward

Youth career
- Club Brugge

Senior career*
Years	Team	Apps	(Gls)
1956–1962	Club Brugge	55	(20)
1962–1965	FC Barcelona	17	(1)
1965–1967	Real Madrid	3	(1)
1967–1968	Elche CF	18	(0)
1968–1971	OGC Nice	42	(8)
1971–1973	Cercle Brugge	41	(7)
1973–1974	SC Lokeren	13	(0)
1974–1976	WS Lauwe		
1976–1977	RC Tournai		
1977–1979	WS Lauwe		

International career
1959–1961	Belgium	8	(1)

Managerial career
- WS Lauwe
- * Club domestic league appearances and goals

Fernand Goyvaerts (24 October 1938 – 5 April 2004) was a Belgian international footballer. He played as an attacker.

== Club career ==
He made his début for the first team of Club Brugge at the age of 16. In 1958, his penalty kick against CS Verviers was decisive for the promotion of Club to the highest level in Belgian football. He left Club Brugge in 1962 after a conflict with the Romanian coach Norberto Höfling. FC Barcelona paid 5 million Belgian franc for him. Two years later, he was voted best foreigner of the Primera División.

One year later, Goyvaerts left Barcelona for Real Madrid, making him the only Belgian still to have played for both Spanish giants. Due to injuries, he was never able to break through. He followed his coach Alfredo Di Stéfano to Elche CF.

In 1971, Goyvaerts returned to Belgium. He went from OGC Nice to Cercle Brugge. Goyvaerts would go on to play for SC Lokeren, WS Lauwe and RC Tournai.

== International career ==
Though being one of the most talented Belgian men's footballers of his era, Goyvaerts only played 8 times for the Red Devils, his lone goal coming in a match against Netherlands. At the time, professional footballers were not allowed to play for the national team.

== Retirement and death ==
After his footballing career, Goyvaerts worked as agent for several players. He died of a cerebral hemorrhage, aged only 65.

== Honours and awards ==
=== Barcelona ===
- Copa del Generalísimo: 1962–63

=== Real Madrid ===
- European Cup: 1965–66
- La Liga: 1966-67

=== Nice ===
- Ligue 2: 1969-70
- Trophée des Champions: 1970

=== Individual ===
- Best Foreign Player in the Primera División: 1964–65
