= José Luis Veloso =

Spanish footballer (1937–2019)

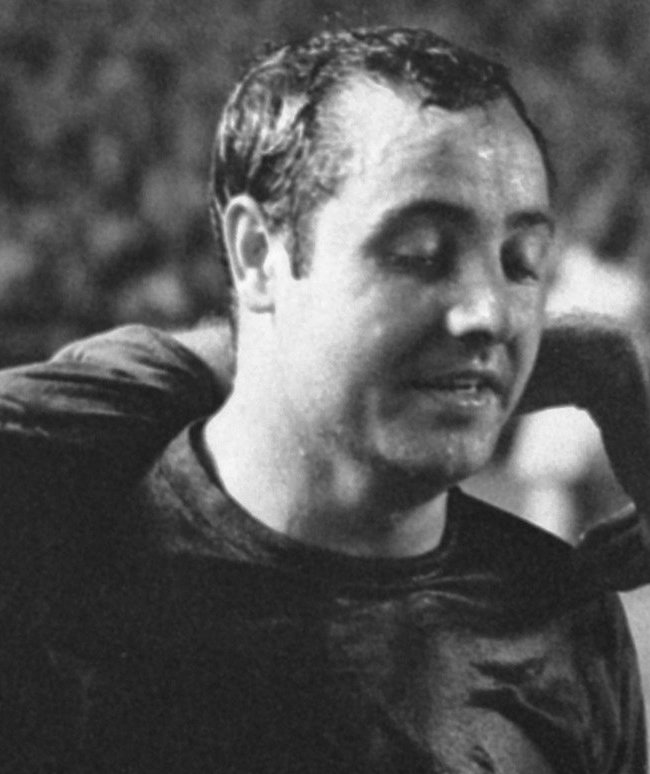
- Veloso in 1967

Personal information
- Full name: José Luis Fidalgo Veloso
- Date of birth: 23 March 1937
- Place of birth: Compostela, Spain
- Date of death: 13 November 2019 (aged 82)
- Place of death: Compostela, Spain
- Height: 1.67 m (5 ft 6 in)
- Position: Striker

Youth career
- Santiago

Senior career*
Years	Team	Apps	(Gls)
1955–1957	Santiago		
1957–1958	Celta Turista		
1958–1965	Deportivo La Coruña	183	(95)
1965–1969	Real Madrid	32	(15)
1969–1970	Ourense	26	(5)
1970–1972	Rayo Vallecano	37	(6)
1972–1973	Compostela		
Total		278	(121)

International career
1962–1963	Spain	4	(3)
- * Club domestic league appearances and goals

José Luis Fidalgo Veloso (23 March 1937 – 13 November 2019) was a Spanish footballer who played as a striker.

He amassed La Liga totals of 84 games and 33 goals over the course of six seasons, representing Deportivo and Real Madrid.

== Club career ==
Born in Santiago de Compostela, Galicia, Veloso played professionally with Deportivo de La Coruña, Real Madrid, CD Ourense and Rayo Vallecano. He was used almost exclusively as a reserve with the second club, but still managed to score nine goals in only 16 games in the 1966–67 season to win the first of his three La Liga championships. Additionally, he netted three times in just five matches in the European Cup, being part of the squad that won the 1966 edition.

Veloso retired in 1973 aged 36, after one year with local side SD Compostela in the lower leagues.

== International career ==
Veloso earned four caps for Spain in seven months. Two of his three goals came in the qualifying phase for the 1964 European Nations' Cup, which the country eventually won as hosts; he was overlooked for the finals, however.

=== International goals ===
#	Date	Venue	Opponent	Score	Result	Competition
1.	1 November 1962	Santiago Bernabéu, Madrid, Spain	Romania	2–0	6–0	1964 European Nations' Cup qualifying
2.	25 November 1962	Stadionul 23 August, Bucharest, Romania	Romania	3–1	3–1	1964 European Nations' Cup qualifying
3.	13 June 1963	Santiago Bernabéu, Madrid, Spain	Scotland	2–4	2–6	Friendly

== Death ==
Veloso died on 13 November 2019, at the age of 82.

== Honours ==
Real Madrid

- La Liga: 1966–67, 1967–68, 1968–69
- European Cup: 1965–66

Individual

- Pichichi Trophy (Segunda División): 1960–61
