= Manolín Bueno =

Spanish footballer (1940–2026)

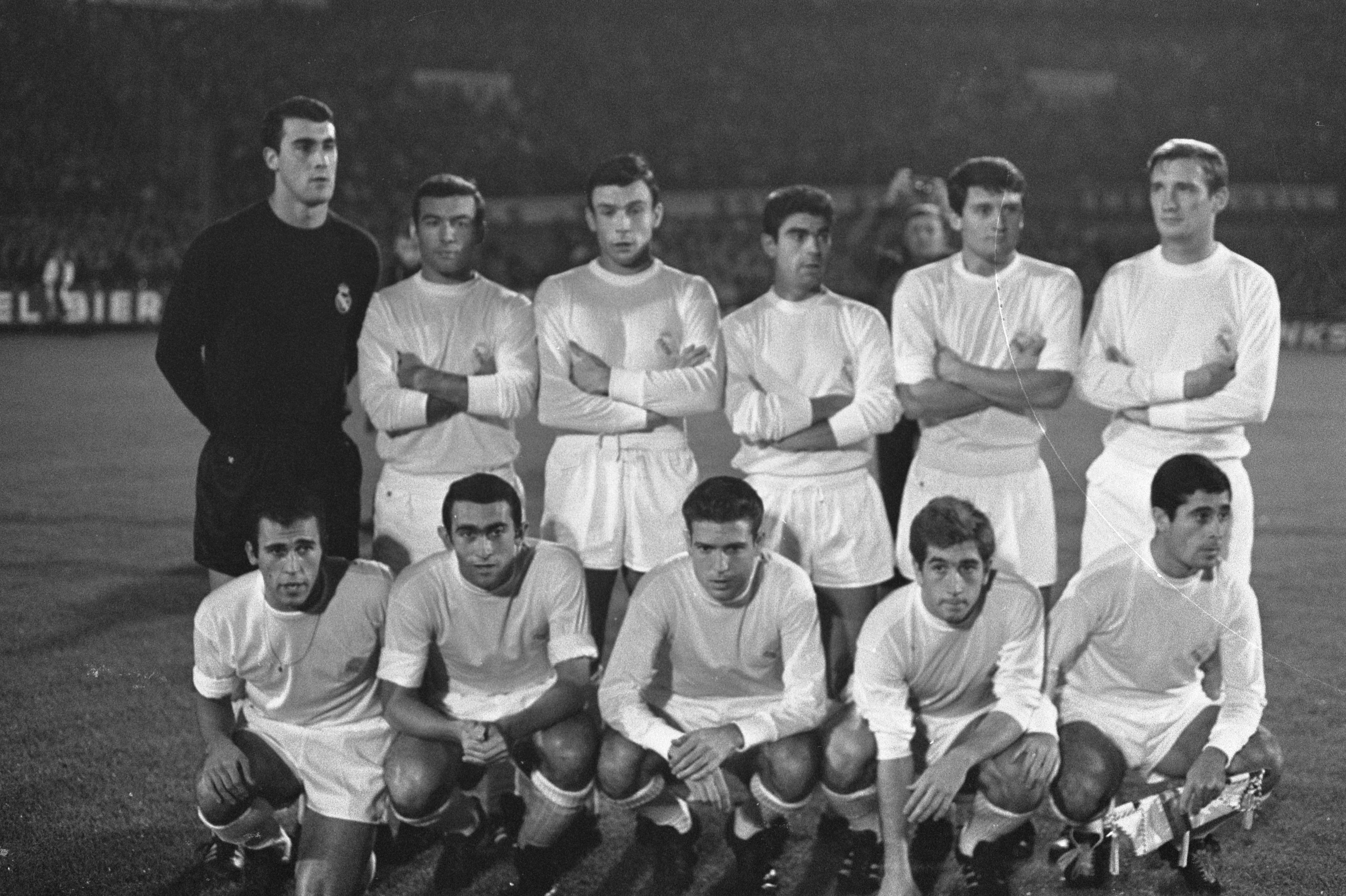
- Bueno (seated on the right) with Real Madrid (1967)

Personal information
- Full name: Manuel Bueno Cabral
- Date of birth: 5 February 1940
- Place of birth: Seville, Spain
- Date of death: 7 February 2026 (aged 86)
- Height: 1.65 m (5 ft 5 in)
- Position: Forward

Youth career
- 1953–1957: Cádiz

Senior career*
Years	Team	Apps	(Gls)
1957–1958	Balón Cádiz		
1958–1959	Cádiz	23	(6)
1959–1971	Real Madrid	76	(15)
1971–1973	Sevilla	30	(4)
1973–1975	Balón Cádiz		
Total		129	(25)

International career
1960	Spain U21	1	(0)
1961	Spain B	2	(1)
- * Club domestic league appearances and goals

Manuel "Manolín" Bueno Cabral (5 February 1940 – 7 February 2026) was a Spanish professional footballer who played as a forward.

== Club career ==
The son of a former goalkeeper, also named Manuel (1910–1970), Bueno was born in Seville, Andalusia, and started playing with Cádiz CF in Segunda División.

In 1959, the 19-year-old signed with Real Madrid, where he would remain for the following 11 campaigns. Behind Francisco Gento in the queue for selection at both club and international level, Bueno featured infrequently for the Whites, never appearing in more than nine league games in any season except his last, where he also scored a career-best seven goals to help the side to a fourth-place finish. Despite this, the club itself credits him with eight Primera División titles, as well as two national cups and two European Cups, though he did not take part in any of the finals (he did play in one leg of their 1960 Intercontinental Cup victory). He left Real Madrid in the summer of 1971 with competitive totals of 119 matches and 27 goals.

Bueno retired from the professional game at the end of 1972–73 after two years – one spent in each major level – with hometown club Sevilla FC.

== Death ==
On 7 February 2026, it was announced that Bueno had died at the age of 86.

== Honours ==
Real Madrid

- European Cup: 1959–60, 1965–66
- Intercontinental Cup: 1960
- La Liga: 1960–61, 1961–62, 1962–63, 1963–64, 1964–65, 1966–67, 1967–68, 1968–69
- Copa del Generalísimo: 1961–62, 1969–70
