= Antonio Calpe =

Spanish footballer (1940–2021)

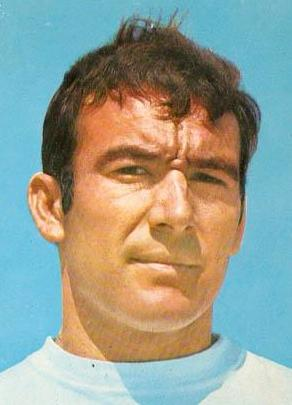

Personal information
- Full name: Antonio Calpe Hernández
- Date of birth: 4 February 1940
- Place of birth: Valencia, Spain
- Date of death: 7 April 2021 (aged 81)
- Height: 1.73 m (5 ft 8 in)
- Position: Defender

Senior career*
Years	Team	Apps	(Gls)
1959–1962	Alcoyano		
1962–1965	Levante	87	(1)
1965–1971	Real Madrid	97	(1)
1971–1975	Levante		

International career
1964	Spain B	1	(0)

Managerial career
- 1981: Levante
- * Club domestic league appearances and goals

Antonio Calpe Hernández (4 February 1940 – 7 April 2021) was a Spanish professional footballer who played as a defender.

== Club career ==
Born in Valencia, Calpe started playing professionally with local Levante UD, competing from 1963 to 1965 in La Liga. In the summer of 1965 he joined Real Madrid, being part of the squads during their Yé-yé era and winning five major trophies, including three national championships and the 1965–66 edition of the European Cup; he appeared in 12 matches in the latter competition for the team during his stint.

In 1971, 31-year-old Calpe returned to his previous club, spending the vast majority of his second spell in Tercera División. The only exception to this occurred in the 1973–74 season in Segunda División, and he retired from the game in June 1975.

Calpe was one of three managers for Levante in 1981–82, as the second-tier campaign eventually ended in relegation.

== Death ==
Calpe died on 7 April 2021 at the age of 81, after a long illness.

== Honours ==
Real Madrid

- La Liga: 1966–67, 1967–68, 1968–69
- Copa del Generalísimo: 1969–70
- European Cup: 1965–66

Levante

- Tercera División: 1972–73
