= Fernando Zunzunegui =

Spanish footballer

Personal information
- Full name: Fernando Zunzunegui Rodríguez
- Date of birth: 5 October 1943
- Place of birth: Vigo, Spain
- Date of death: 28 August 2014 (aged 70)
- Position: Defender

Youth career
- Chao
- Celta

Senior career*
Years	Team	Apps	(Gls)
1962–1963	Turista		
1963–1965	Celta	55	(3)
1965–1973	Real Madrid	76	(4)
1973–1976	Levante	24	(0)

International career
1962	Spain U18	2	(0)
- * Club domestic league appearances and goals

Fernando Zunzunegui Rodríguez (5 October 1943 – 28 August 2014) was a Spanish footballer, who played as a defender.

== Career ==
A native of Vigo, Zunzunegui began playing youth football with local side Chao. Soon he joined Celta de Vigo's B team (then known as Turista) before moving up to play for Celta's senior side. After impressing in 63 official matches with Celta, Zunzunegui joined Real Madrid in 1965. However, he was required to perform military service in Laayoune, Spanish Sahara and missed out on Real Madrid's 1965–66 European Cup triumph. After completing his military service, Zunzunegui re-joined Real Madrid, winning La Liga four times and the Copa del Rey once. He made 112 official appearances for Real Madrid over seven seasons, before leaving for UD Levante.

== Honours ==
Real Madrid

- 4 Spanish League: 1966–67, 1967–68, 1968–69, 1971–72
- Spanish Cup: 1969–70
