= Chato González =

Spanish footballer and manager (1944–2024)

Personal information
- Full name: Eduardo González Ruiz
- Date of birth: 3 January 1944
- Place of birth: Madrid, Spain
- Date of death: 8 August 2024 (aged 80)
- Height: 1.77 m (5 ft 10 in)
- Position: Midfielder

Youth career
- 1961–1963: Real Madrid

Senior career*
Years	Team	Apps	(Gls)
1963–1966	Real Madrid B		
1965–1966	→ Rayo Vallecano (loan)	30	(0)
1966–1971	Real Madrid	13	(0)
1969–1970	→ Murcia (loan)	46	(0)
1971–1973	Xerez		

International career
1965–1968	Spain amateur	17	(1)

Managerial career
- 1978–1979: Rayo Vallecano
- 1980–1981: Rayo Vallecano
- 1983–1989: Alcalá
- 1989–1992: Ávila
- 1992–1994: Cacereño
- 1994: Murcia
- 1995: Getafe
- 1996–1997: Córdoba
- 1999: Murcia
- 2001–2002: Murcia
- * Club domestic league appearances and goals

Eduardo "Chato" González Ruiz (3 January 1944 – 8 August 2024) was a Spanish football player and manager. He played as a midfielder.

== Playing career ==
Born in Madrid, González joined Real Madrid's youth setup in 1961. After making his professional debut while on loan at neighbours Rayo Vallecano in Segunda División, he was promoted to the first team in 1966.

González made his La Liga debut on 18 September 1966, in a 1–0 away win against Pontevedra CF. However, he only appeared rarely for the Blancos, and was a part of the squad which won three league titles in a row.

In January 1969 González was loaned to Real Murcia in the second level. The loan was renewed for one year in the summer, and he was an undisputed starter for the side which suffered relegation.

González subsequently returned to Real Madrid, making no appearances during the campaign. In 1971, he moved to Xerez CD in the second tier, and retired with the club in 1973.

== Managerial career ==
In 1978 González was appointed manager of Rayo Vallecano in the top level. Replaced by Héctor Núñez in the following year, he was again named at the helm of the main squad in 1980, with the side now in the second tier.

González would subsequently manage RSD Alcalá, Real Ávila CF, CP Cacereño, Real Murcia (three spells), Getafe CF and Córdoba CF.

== Death ==
González died on 8 August 2024, at the age of 80.

== Honours ==
Real Madrid'

- La Liga: 1966–67, 1967–68, 1968–69
