= Rafael De Diego =

Spanish footballer (1944–1982)

Personal information
- Full name: Rafael De Diego Larrañaga
- Date of birth: 7 May 1944
- Place of birth: Getaria, Spain
- Date of death: 17 August 1982 (aged 38)
- Place of death: Luanco, Spain
- Height: 1.68 m (5 ft 6 in)
- Position: Forward

Senior career*
Years	Team	Apps	(Gls)
1963–1964	Real Sociedad	8	(0)
1965–1967	Real Oviedo	26	(16)
1967–1970	Real Madrid	5	(2)
1970–1971	Sabadell	26	(9)
1971–1972	Sevilla	20	(3)
1972–1974	Español	39	(15)
1974–1976	Sporting Gijón	33	(10)
1976–1978	Ensidesa	10	(6)
Total		167	(61)
- * Club domestic league appearances and goals

Rafael De Diego Larrañaga (7 May 1944 – 17 August 1982) was a Spanish footballer who played as a forward. He died in an explosion at a restaurant.
