= Andrés Junquera =

Spanish footballer(1946–2019)

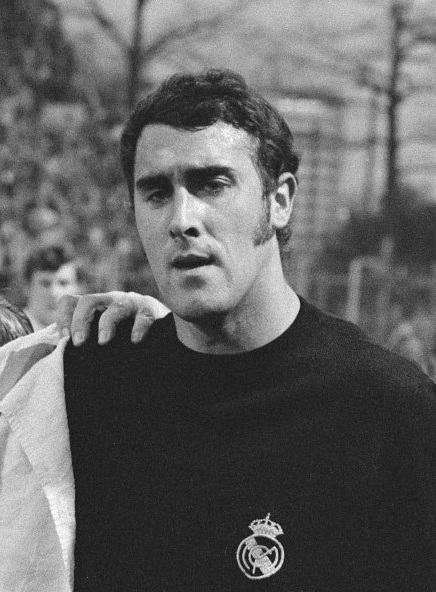
- Junquera in 1971

Personal information
- Full name: Andrés Avelino Zapico Junquera
- Date of birth: 23 April 1946
- Place of birth: La Felguera, Spain
- Date of death: 6 May 2019 (aged 73)
- Place of death: Riañu, Spain
- Height: 1.94 m (6 ft 4 in)
- Position: Goalkeeper

Youth career
- Nava
- 1961–1963: Cruz Blanca Felguerina

Senior career*
| Years | Team | Apps | (Gls) |
| 1963–1966 | Langreo | 28 | (0) |
| 1966–1975 | Real Madrid | 56 | (0) |
| 1975–1978 | Zaragoza | 43 | (0) |
| Total | | 127 | (0) |
- * Club domestic league appearances and goals

Andrés Avelino Zapico Junquera (23 April 1946 – 6 May 2019) was a Spanish professional footballer who played as a goalkeeper.

== Club career ==
Born in La Felguera, Langreo, Asturias, Junquera started his senior career with local club UP Langreo in the Segunda División. He signed with Real Madrid in 1966, making his La Liga debut on 10 September 1967 in a 2–0 away win against Sevilla FC.

During his spell at the Santiago Bernabéu Stadium, Junquera won the national championship five times, adding three Copa del Generalísimo trophies and the Ricardo Zamora Trophy in the 1967–68 season. He added seven appearances in the UEFA European Cup.

Junquera joined Real Zaragoza in the summer of 1975, being relegated to the second tier in 1976–77 but winning promotion the following campaign. He retired due to a meniscus injury in 1978, at the age of 32.

== Later life and death ==
After retiring from football, Junquera ran a hospitality business in Sama.

The 73-year-old suffered a heart attack on 6 May 2019, being pronounced dead at the Valle del Nalón Hospital in Riañu the same day.
