= 1966–67 Copa del Generalísimo =

65th Copa del Rey

Tournament details
- Country: Spain
- Teams: 48

Final positions
- Champions: Valencia CF (4th title)
- Runners-up: Club Atlético de Bilbao

Tournament statistics
- Matches played: 100

The 1966–67 Copa del Generalísimo was the 65th staging of the Spanish Cup. The competition began on 23 October 1966 and ended on 2 July 1967 with the final.

== First round ==
Team 1	Agg.	Team 2	1st leg	2nd leg
CA Ceuta	2–1	Real Valladolid	2–1	0–0
CF Badalona	3–5	CA Osasuna	3–3	0–2
Burgos CF	2–6	Cádiz CF	1–3	1–3
Calvo Sotelo CF	1–2	UD Lérida	0–1	1–1
CD Condal	0–1	Gimnástica de Torrelavega	0–0	0–1
CD Constancia	2–2	Real Oviedo	2–1	0–1
CD Europa	2–1	Club Ferrol	2–0	0–1
Real Gijón	5–6	Levante UD	5–3	0–3
Recreativo de Huelva	5–3	Rayo Vallecano	2–2	3–1
UP Langreo	0–5	CD Castellón	0–1	0–4
CD Logroñés	0–7	Real Betis Balompié	0–4	0–3
CD Málaga	1–0	Celta Vigo	1–0	0–0
CD Mestalla	4–3	SD Indauchu	1–2	3–1
Real Sociedad	2–1	Algeciras CF	1–1	1–0
Real Santander	3–3	RCD Mallorca	1–0	2–3
CD Tenerife	4–2	Real Murcia	2–0	2–2

Source: RSSSF

- Tiebreaker

Team 1	Score	Team 2
CD Constancia	1–0	Real Oviedo
Real Santander	2–3	RCD Mallorca

== Round of 32 ==
Team 1	Agg.	Team 2	1st leg	2nd leg
Club Atlético de Bilbao	4–0	Recreativo de Huelva	3–0	1–0
CA Ceuta	4–7	Córdoba CF	4–2	0–5
Club Atlético de Madrid	6–2	RCD Mallorca	5–0	1–2
CF Barcelona	3–1	CD Málaga	1–0	2–1
Cádiz CF	1–8	Valencia CF	1–2	0–6
CD Castellón	0–2	Pontevedra CF	0–1	0–1
CD Constancia	3–7	UD Las Palmas	3–2	0–5
Deportivo La Coruña	2–2	UD Lérida	2–2	0–0
CD Europa	1–1	Real Zaragoza CD	0–1	1–0
Gimnástica de Torrelavega	2–3	Real Madrid CF	2–2	0–1
Hércules CF	4–1	Levante UD	3–0	1–1
CD Mestalla	3–3	Granada CF	3–1	0–2
CA Osasuna	2–3	Elche CF	2–0	0–3
Real Sociedad	1–5	CD Sabadell CF	0–2	1–3
CD Tenerife	4–8	Sevilla CF	2–2	2–6
Real Betis Balompié	6–3	RCD Español	3–0	3–3

- Tiebreaker

Team 1	Score	Team 2
Deportivo La Coruña	4–1	UD Lérida
CD Europa	2–0	Real Zaragoza CD
CD Mestalla	2–3	Granada CF

== Round of 16 ==
Team 1	Agg.	Team 2	1st leg	2nd leg
Club Atlético de Bilbao	3–1	UD Las Palmas	3–0	0–1
Club Atlético de Madrid	4–0	CF Barcelona	2–0	2–0
Real Betis Balompié	2–4	Valencia CF	2–1	0–3
Deportivo La Coruña	4–5	Real Madrid CF	3–2	1–3
Elche CF	3–0	Sevilla CF	2–0	1–0
CD Europa	1–5	Córdoba CF	1–1	0–4
Pontevedra CF	3–2	Hércules CF	3–1	0–1
CD Sabadell CF	2–2	Granada CF	1–1	1–1

Source: RSSSF

- Tiebreaker

Team 1	Score	Team 2
CD Sabadell CF	0–1	Granada CF

== Quarter-finals ==
Team 1	Agg.	Team 2	1st leg	2nd leg
Club Atlético de Madrid	1–3	Club Atlético de Bilbao	0–2	1–1
Granada CF	1–6	Elche CF	1–1	0–5
Pontevedra CF	2–2	Córdoba CF	1–1	1–1
Valencia CF	3–1	Real Madrid CF	2–1	1–0

Source: RSSSF

- Tiebreaker

Team 1	Score	Team 2
Pontevedra CF	0–1	Córdoba CF

== Semi-finals ==
Team 1	Agg.	Team 2	1st leg	2nd leg
Córdoba CF	0–3	Club Atlético de Bilbao	0–1	0–2
Elche CF	2–3	Valencia CF	2–1	0–2

== Final ==
Team 1	Score	Team 2
Valencia CF	2–1	Club Atlético de Bilbao

Copa del Generalísimo
winners
Valencia CF
4th title
