= 1967–68 Copa del Generalísimo =

66th Copa del Rey

Tournament details
- Country: Spain
- Teams: 48

Final positions
- Champions: FC Barcelona (16th title)
- Runners-up: Real Madrid

Tournament statistics
- Matches played: 100

The 1967–68 Copa del Generalísimo was the 66th staging of the Spanish Cup. The competition began on 1 October 1967 and ended on 11 July 1968 with the final.

== First round ==
Team 1	Agg.	Team 2	1st leg	2nd leg
CA Ceuta	2–4	Real Santander	1–2	1–2
CD Badajoz	4–3	Real Murcia	4–2	0–1
Granada CF	4–4	UP Langreo	2–2	2–2
Xerez CD	3–3	UD Lérida	3–0	0–3
Cádiz CF	2–5	Real Gijón	2–1	0–4
Calvo Sotelo CF	3–0	Club Ferrol	1–0	2–0
CD Castellón	3–2	CA Osasuna	3–1	0–1
CD Alcoyano	2–0	Burgos CF	2–0	0–0
Deportivo de La Coruña	2–4	Hércules CF	1–3	1–1
CD Europa	4–4	Real Jaén CF	4–0	0–4
Gimnástica de Torrelavega	2–2	CD Mestalla	0–1	2–1
RC Celta de Vigo	4–0	RCD Mallorca	3–0	1–0
CD Constancia	2–10	Real Valladolid	2–2	0–8
Rayo Vallecano	3–2	CD Tenerife	3–1	0–1
Levante UD	2–5	CF Badalona	2–1	0–4
Real Oviedo CF	4–4	Recreativo de Huelva	3–2	1–2

Source: RSSSF

- Tiebreaker

Team 1	Score	Team 2
CD Europa	1–0	Real Jaén
Gimnástica de Torrelavega	3–2	CD Mestalla
Granada CF	0–1	UP Langreo
Xerez CD	2–1	UD Lérida
Real Oviedo	1–1	Recreativo de Huelva (Note: Recreativo de Huelva was the winner by the criteria of the corner kicks difference along the three matches.)

== Round of 32 ==
Team 1	Agg.	Team 2	1st leg	2nd leg
Xerez CD	2–3	CD Sabadell CF	2–0	0–3
CF Badalona	3–3	Real Betis Balompié	2–3	1–0
RC Celta de Vigo	3–1	Córdoba CF	1–1	2–0
CF Barcelona	5–2	Real Gijón	5–0	0–2
Recreativo de Huelva	2–3	Pontevedra CF	2–0	0–3
Real Santander	1–4	Real Sociedad de Fútbol	0–1	1–3
Hércules CF	2–4	RCD Español	0–0	2–4
UP Langreo	1–10	UD Las Palmas	1–4	1–6
Real Zaragoza CD	4–0	CD Europa	3–0	1–0
Real Madrid CF	3–0	Calvo Sotelo CF	2–0	1–0
CD Málaga	2–0	CD Castellón	1–0	1–0
Sevilla CF	7–4	AD Rayo Vallecano	7–3	0–1
Real Valladolid	3–6	Club Atlético de Madrid	0–3	3–3
Valencia CF	6–0	Gimnástica de Torrelavega	5–0	1–0
Club Atlético de Bilbao	5–1	CD Alcoyano	1–0	4–1
CD Badajoz	2–5	Elche CF	0–1	2–4

Source: RSSSF

- Tiebreaker

Team 1	Score	Team 2
CF Badalona	1–3	Real Betis Balompié

== Round of 16 ==
Team 1	Agg.	Team 2	1st leg	2nd leg
RCD Español	1–2	Valencia CF	1–0	0–2
Pontevedra CF	1–2	RC Celta de Vigo	0–0	1–2
Real Sociedad de Fútbol	1–8	FC Barcelona	0–2	1–6
CD Sabadell CF	1–5	Real Zaragoza CD	0–0	1–5
Real Betis Balompié	1–2	Club Atlético de Madrid	0–0	1–2
Elche CF	2–0	CD Málaga	1–0	1–0
Club Atlético de Bilbao	6–2	UD Las Palmas	6–0	0–2
Real Madrid CF	5–3	Sevilla CF	1–0	4–3

Source: RSSSF

== Quarter-finals ==
Team 1	Agg.	Team 2	1st leg	2nd leg
Elche CF	3–3	RC Celta de Vigo	3–0	0–3
FC Barcelona	3–1	Club Atlético de Bilbao	3–1	0–0
Club Atlético de Madrid	4–2	Valencia CF	1–0	3–2
Real Zaragoza CD	3–4	Real Madrid CF	3–2	0–2

Source: RSSSF

- Tiebreaker

Team 1	Score	Team 2
Elche CF	1–2	RC Celta de Vigo

== Semi-finals ==
Team 1	Agg.	Team 2	1st leg	2nd leg
Club Atlético de Madrid	2–3	FC Barcelona	1–0	1–3
RC Celta de Vigo	3–5	Real Madrid	3–2	0–3

Source: RSSSF

== Final ==
Team 1	Score	Team 2
FC Barcelona	1–0	Real Madrid CF

Copa del Generalísimo
winners
FC Barcelona
16th title
