= Antonio Betancort =

Spanish footballer (1937–2015)

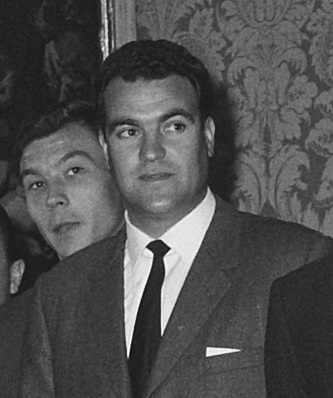

Personal information
- Full name: Antonio Rodrigo Betancort Barrera
- Date of birth: 13 March 1937
- Place of birth: Spain
- Date of death: 15 March 2015 (aged 78)
- Place of death: Las Palmas, Gran Canaria, Spain
- Position: Goalkeeper

Youth career
- Unión Atlético

Senior career*
Years	Team	Apps	(Gls)
1955–1961	Las Palmas	3	(0)
1961–1962	Real Madrid	0	(0)
1962–1963	Deportivo La Coruña	24	(0)
1963–1971	Real Madrid	129	(0)
1971–1973	Las Palmas	42	(0)
Total		198	(0)

International career
1965	Spain	2	(0)
- * Club domestic league appearances and goals

Antonio Rodrigo Betancort Barrera (13 March 1937 – 15 March 2015) was a Spanish footballer. He was born in Las Palmas, and played as a goalkeeper for Las Palmas, Real Madrid, and Deportivo La Coruña, and the Spain national team.

== Club career ==
=== Early years and breakthrough ===
Betancort started out at his local club UD Las Palmas, who were playing in the La Liga back then. Despite joining the club at age 18 in 1955, he only made his debut in a Copa del Generalisimo match against Atlético Madrid, but the Canarian club got thrashed 6-0. Being the reserve goalkeeper behind starter Pepín and later demoted to third choice by Jose Luis Ulacia, he got his breakthrough in the 1960-61 season with Pepín being sold to Real Betis. That season, Ulacia was meant to take the starting spot, but Betancort still managed to take over and lead the club to 5th place in the Segunda División.

In 1961, Antonio Betancort signed for Real Madrid CF, being planned as a back-up behind José Araquistáin and several other back-ups, such as José Vicente and Rogelio Domínguez, in the hope to again fight himself to the starting XI. However, he managed to not play a single match, resulting in signing for La Liga promotees Deportivo de A Coruña the following summer. Again, he fought himself into the usual squad, but he didn't avoid a 14th place finish, resulting in a participation in the relegation play-offs. Nevertheless, after losing both legs to Levante UD, he again signed for Miguel Muñoz' Real Madrid in 1963.

=== Second spell at Real Madrid and rise to stardom (1963-1971) ===
Antonio Betancort died on 15 March 2015 in Las Palmas, of undisclosed reasons.

== Honours ==
Real Madrid

- European Cup: 1965–66
