= 1966–67 La Liga =

36th season of La Liga

Primera División
- Season: 1966–67
- Champions: Real Madrid (12th title)
- Relegated: Granada CF; Hércules CF; Deportivo La Coruña
- European Cup: Real Madrid
- Cup Winners' Cup: Valencia
- Matches: 240
- Goals: 656 (2.73 per match)
- Top goalscorer: Waldo (24 goals)
- Biggest home win: Atlético Bilbao 6–0 Sevilla; Valencia 6–0 Zaragoza
- Biggest away win: Granada 0–3 Español; Deportivo La Coruña 0–3 Barcelona
- Highest scoring: Atlético Madrid 7–2 Hércules

The 1966–67 La Liga was the 36th season since its establishment. The season began on 10 September 1966, and concluded on 30th April 1967.

== Team locations ==
Location of teams in 1966–67 La Liga
Canary Islands

Team	Home city	Stadium
Atlético Bilbao	Bilbao	San Mamés
Atlético Madrid	Madrid	Vicente Calderón
Barcelona	Barcelona	Nou Camp
Córdoba	Córdoba	El Arcángel
Deportivo La Coruña	A Coruña	Riazor
Elche	Elche	Altabix
Español	Barcelona	Sarrià
Granada	Granada	Los Cármenes
Hércules	Alicante	La Viña
Las Palmas	Las Palmas	Insular
Pontevedra	Pontevedra	Pasarón
Real Madrid	Madrid	Santiago Bernabéu
Sabadell	Sabadell	Creu Alta
Sevilla	Seville	Ramón Sánchez Pizjuán
Valencia	Valencia	Mestalla
Zaragoza	Zaragoza	La Romareda

== League table ==
Pos	Team	Pld	W	D	L	GF	GA	GD	Pts	Qualification or relegation
1	Real Madrid (C)	30	19	9	2	58	22	+36	47	Qualification for the European Cup first round
2	Barcelona	30	20	2	8	58	29	+29	42	Invited for the Inter-Cities Fairs Cup
3	Español	30	15	7	8	50	40	+10	37	
4	Atlético Madrid	30	14	7	9	57	30	+27	35	Invited for the Inter-Cities Fairs Cup
5	Zaragoza	30	14	6	10	51	50	+1	34	Invited for the Inter-Cities Fairs Cup
6	Valencia	30	14	4	12	58	37	+21	32	Qualification for the Cup Winners' Cup first round (Note: Valencia qualified to the Cup Winners' Cup as champions of the Copa del Generalísimo.)
7	Atlético Bilbao	30	11	9	10	43	36	+7	31	Invited for the Inter-Cities Fairs Cup
8	Sabadell	30	11	8	11	35	38	−3	30	
9	Elche	30	9	9	12	41	50	−9	27	
10	Pontevedra	30	9	9	12	28	32	−4	27	
11	Las Palmas	30	8	10	12	32	38	−6	26	
12	Córdoba	30	9	8	13	28	44	−16	26	
13	Sevilla (O)	30	9	7	14	28	47	−19	25	Qualification for the relegation play-offs
14	Granada (R)	30	8	7	15	32	46	−14	23	Qualification for the relegation play-offs
15	Hércules (R)	30	6	8	16	32	60	−28	20	Relegation to the Segunda División
16	Deportivo La Coruña (R)	30	7	4	19	25	57	−32	18	Relegation to the Segunda División

Source: BDFútbol
Rules for classification: 1) Points; 2) Head-to-head results; 3) Goal difference; 4) Number of goals scored
(C) Champions; (O) Play-off winners; (R) Relegated

== Results ==
Home \ Away	ATB	ATM	BAR	CÓR	DEP	ELC	ESP	GRA	HER	LPA	PON	RMA	SAB	SEV	VAL	ZAR
Atlético Bilbao	—	1–0	0–0	3–0	4–0	2–1	1–3	2–1	0–0	3–0	2–1	0–0	1–1	6–0	2–1	2–3
Atlético Madrid	3–1	—	0–1	2–0	4–0	5–2	5–1	2–0	7–2	2–1	3–1	2–2	3–0	3–0	1–1	0–0
CF Barcelona	3–1	3–2	—	4–1	5–0	3–0	3–1	3–0	4–1	2–1	0–1	2–1	2–0	5–0	2–1	2–1
Córdoba CF	2–0	1–0	2–1	—	1–0	0–0	2–0	2–2	1–1	0–0	1–0	0–1	3–2	3–0	2–1	1–1
Deportivo de La Coruña	1–0	0–1	0–3	2–0	—	1–1	1–1	2–1	1–0	1–1	1–2	2–3	0–1	1–1	0–1	4–1
Elche CF	1–1	2–1	4–3	0–0	1–3	—	1–1	0–1	4–0	2–1	3–1	1–1	3–2	3–0	0–0	5–1
RCD Español	2–1	1–0	2–0	2–1	3–2	3–0	—	1–0	4–1	1–1	2–2	2–3	4–1	3–1	2–1	2–1
Granada CF	1–1	2–1	1–2	1–1	1–0	2–1	0–3	—	2–1	0–1	1–1	1–1	2–0	0–0	3–2	6–2
Hércules CF	1–2	2–4	1–1	1–1	0–1	1–3	3–3	2–1	—	2–1	1–0	0–2	0–0	2–1	4–1	1–1
UD Las Palmas	2–4	1–0	2–0	2–1	2–0	3–0	0–0	1–1	0–1	—	0–0	1–1	1–0	1–2	0–0	2–3
Pontevedra CF	1–1	0–0	0–1	2–1	1–0	1–1	3–0	1–0	2–1	2–3	—	0–1	0–0	3–0	3–0	0–0
Real Madrid	4–0	2–1	1–0	3–0	2–0	4–1	1–1	2–0	2–1	1–1	2–0	—	5–0	3–0	4–2	3–1
CE Sabadell FC	1–0	0–0	2–0	3–0	3–0	0–0	0–1	1–0	5–2	1–1	3–0	1–1	—	1–0	3–0	3–2
Sevilla CF	1–1	1–1	0–2	4–0	3–0	3–1	1–0	3–1	0–0	2–0	0–0	0–1	0–0	—	1–0	3–1
Valencia CF	1–0	0–2	3–0	3–1	5–1	5–0	2–1	3–0	4–0	2–1	3–0	0–0	6–1	3–0	—	6–0
Zaragoza	1–1	2–2	0–1	3–0	5–1	1–0	2–0	4–1	2–0	4–1	1–0	2–1	1–0	2–1	3–1	—

Source: BDFútbol
Legend: Blue = home team win; Yellow = draw; Red = away team win.

== Relegation play-offs ==
Team 1	Agg.	Team 2	1st leg	2nd leg
Real Gijón	0–2	Sevilla	0–1	0–1
Granada	0–3	Real Betis	0–1	0–2

== Pichichi Trophy ==
Rank	Player	Club	Goals
1	(Brazil) Waldo	Valencia	24
2	(Spain) Eleuterio Santos Brito	Zaragoza	15
3	(Spain) Marcelino	Zaragoza	13
4	(Spain) José García Lavilla	Español	12
5	(Spain) Luis Aragonés	Atlético Madrid	11
5	(Spain) Francisco Gento	Real Madrid	11
