= 1967–68 La Liga =

37th season of La Liga

Primera División
- Season: 1967–68
- Champions: Real Madrid (13th title)
- Relegated: Real Betis; Sevilla
- European Cup: Real Madrid
- Cup Winners' Cup: Barcelona
- Matches: 240
- Goals: 654 (2.73 per match)
- Top goalscorer: Fidel Uriarte (22 goals)
- Biggest home win: Real Madrid 9–1 Real Sociedad; Atlético Bilbao 8–0 Real Betis
- Biggest away win: Español 0–4 Real Madrid
- Highest scoring: Real Madrid 9–1 Real Sociedad

The 1967–68 La Liga was the 37th season since its establishment. It began on 9 September 1967, and concluded on 28 April 1968.

== Team locations ==
Location of teams in La Liga 1967–68
Canary Islands

| Team | Home city | Stadium |
|---|---|---|
| Atlético Bilbao | Bilbao | San Mamés |
| Atlético Madrid | Madrid | Vicente Calderón |
| Barcelona | Barcelona | Nou Camp |
| Córdoba | Córdoba | El Arcángel |
| Elche | Elche | Altabix |
| Español | Barcelona | Sarrià |
| Las Palmas | Las Palmas | Insular |
| Málaga | Málaga | La Rosaleda |
| Pontevedra | Pontevedra | Pasarón |
| Real Betis | Seville | Benito Villamarín |
| Real Madrid | Madrid | Santiago Bernabéu |
| Real Sociedad | San Sebastián | Atocha |
| Sabadell | Sabadell | Creu Alta |
| Sevilla | Seville | Ramón Sánchez Pizjuán |
| Valencia | Valencia | Mestalla |
| Zaragoza | Zaragoza | La Romareda |

== League table ==
| Pos | Team | Pld | W | D | L | GF | GA | GD | Pts | Qualification or relegation |
|---|---|---|---|---|---|---|---|---|---|---|
| 1 | Real Madrid (C) | 30 | 16 | 10 | 4 | 55 | 26 | +29 | 42 | Qualification for the European Cup first round |
| 2 | Barcelona | 30 | 15 | 9 | 6 | 48 | 29 | +19 | 39 | Qualification for the Cup Winners' Cup first round (Note: Barcelona qualified to the Cup Winners' Cup as champions of the Copa del Generalísimo.) |
| 3 | Las Palmas | 30 | 17 | 4 | 9 | 56 | 41 | +15 | 38 | |
| 4 | Valencia | 30 | 13 | 8 | 9 | 52 | 38 | +14 | 34 | Invited for the Inter-Cities Fairs Cup |
| 5 | Zaragoza | 30 | 13 | 7 | 10 | 43 | 34 | +9 | 33 | Invited for the Inter-Cities Fairs Cup |
| 6 | Atlético Madrid | 30 | 12 | 9 | 9 | 38 | 32 | +6 | 33 | Invited for the Inter-Cities Fairs Cup |
| 7 | Atlético Bilbao | 30 | 11 | 10 | 9 | 51 | 28 | +23 | 32 | Invited for the Inter-Cities Fairs Cup |
| 8 | Pontevedra | 30 | 12 | 7 | 11 | 36 | 41 | −5 | 31 | |
| 9 | Español | 30 | 12 | 5 | 13 | 48 | 44 | +4 | 29 | |
| 10 | Elche | 30 | 9 | 9 | 12 | 29 | 37 | −8 | 27 | |
| 11 | Málaga | 30 | 11 | 5 | 14 | 30 | 39 | −9 | 27 | |
| 12 | Sabadell | 30 | 10 | 6 | 14 | 34 | 51 | −17 | 26 | |
| 13 | Córdoba (O) | 30 | 11 | 3 | 16 | 35 | 57 | −22 | 25 | Qualification for the relegation play-offs |
| 14 | Real Sociedad (O) | 30 | 9 | 6 | 15 | 38 | 43 | −5 | 24 | Qualification for the relegation play-offs |
| 15 | Real Betis (R) | 30 | 8 | 4 | 18 | 30 | 58 | −28 | 20 | Relegation to the Segunda División |
| 16 | Sevilla (R) | 30 | 6 | 8 | 16 | 31 | 56 | −25 | 20 | Relegation to the Segunda División |

Source: BDFútbol
Rules for classification: 1) Points; 2) Head-to-head results; 3) Goal difference; 4) Number of goals scored
(C) Champions; (O) Play-off winners; (R) Relegated

== Results ==
| Home \ Away | ATB | ATM | BAR | BET | CÓR | ELC | ESP | LPA | MÁL | PON | RMA | RSO | SAB | SEV | VAL | ZAR |
|---|---|---|---|---|---|---|---|---|---|---|---|---|---|---|---|---|
| Atlético Bilbao | — | 6–1 | 0–0 | 8–0 | 3–0 | 3–0 | 1–2 | 0–1 | 4–0 | 1–1 | 1–2 | 1–1 | 1–1 | 2–0 | 1–0 | 2–0 |
| Atlético Madrid | 2–0 | — | 0–1 | 0–0 | 5–0 | 2–1 | 0–0 | 1–2 | 4–2 | 3–0 | 1–1 | 2–1 | 2–0 | 3–3 | 0–0 | 0–1 |
| CF Barcelona | 1–0 | 1–1 | — | 2–1 | 3–2 | 4–2 | 1–0 | 2–0 | 1–0 | 4–0 | 1–1 | 0–0 | 3–1 | 3–0 | 1–1 | 4–0 |
| Betis | 0–3 | 0–2 | 4–3 | — | 1–0 | 1–0 | 1–4 | 4–2 | 2–0 | 0–1 | 1–2 | 4–1 | 2–3 | 0–0 | 0–2 | 2–1 |
| Córdoba CF | 2–1 | 0–1 | 0–1 | 3–0 | — | 3–0 | 1–0 | 2–1 | 2–3 | 3–1 | 3–3 | 2–0 | 2–1 | 1–1 | 1–1 | 1–0 |
| Elche CF | 1–0 | 1–0 | 0–2 | 1–0 | 3–0 | — | 1–0 | 2–0 | 1–0 | 0–0 | 0–0 | 5–0 | 1–1 | 4–2 | 1–0 | 0–1 |
| RCD Español | 1–1 | 0–1 | 1–0 | 4–0 | 1–2 | 1–1 | — | 3–2 | 4–1 | 4–1 | 0–4 | 2–0 | 3–1 | 4–0 | 4–5 | 1–1 |
| UD Las Palmas | 1–0 | 4–1 | 4–1 | 3–1 | 4–1 | 3–1 | 2–0 | — | 1–1 | 5–0 | 2–2 | 2–1 | 1–0 | 4–1 | 2–1 | 2–1 |
| CD Málaga | 2–2 | 0–1 | 1–1 | 0–0 | 0–1 | 2–0 | 1–0 | 2–0 | — | 3–1 | 1–0 | 2–0 | 1–3 | 0–0 | 0–0 | 2–2 |
| Pontevedra CF | 1–1 | 1–1 | 1–0 | 1–1 | 3–1 | 1–0 | 3–0 | 3–0 | 1–0 | — | 3–0 | 2–0 | 0–0 | 4–1 | 1–0 | 1–0 |
| Real Madrid | 0–0 | 0–0 | 1–1 | 3–0 | 4–0 | 2–0 | 2–2 | 2–1 | 3–0 | 1–0 | — | 9–1 | 2–0 | 1–0 | 0–2 | 3–2 |
| Real Sociedad | 1–1 | 2–0 | 1–1 | 1–0 | 5–1 | 5–0 | 0–1 | 0–1 | 0–0 | 1–0 | 0–1 | — | 6–0 | 5–1 | 2–0 | 2–0 |
| CE Sabadell FC | 1–2 | 1–0 | 1–1 | 3–1 | 2–1 | 1–2 | 2–1 | 2–2 | 1–2 | 1–0 | 2–4 | 1–0 | — | 2–2 | 2–0 | 1–0 |
| Sevilla CF | 2–3 | 0–2 | 2–1 | 2–3 | 1–0 | 1–0 | 3–0 | 0–1 | 0–2 | 2–2 | 0–2 | 0–0 | 1–0 | — | 2–0 | 1–2 |
| Valencia CF | 3–3 | 3–1 | 1–2 | 2–1 | 5–0 | 1–1 | 2–3 | 2–2 | 2–1 | 6–2 | 2–0 | 3–2 | 1–0 | 4–2 | — | 3–1 |
| Zaragoza | 1–0 | 1–1 | 3–2 | 1–0 | 3–0 | 3–1 | 4–2 | 4–1 | 0–0 | 2–1 | 0–0 | 1–0 | 7–0 | 1–1 | 0–0 | — |

Source: BDFútbol
Legend: Blue = home team win; Yellow = draw; Red = away team win.

== Relegation play–offs ==
| Team 1 | Agg. | Team 2 | 1st leg | 2nd leg |
|---|---|---|---|---|
| Real Valladolid | 0–1 | Real Sociedad | 0–1 | 0–0 |
| Córdoba | 6–1 | Calvo Sotelo | 3–0 | 3–1 |

== Pichichi Trophy ==
| Rank | Player | Club | Goals |
|---|---|---|---|
| 1 | (Spain) Fidel Uriarte | Atlético Bilbao | 22 |
| 2 | (Spain) Luis Aragonés | Atlético Madrid | 16 |
| 3 | (Spain) Julián Roldán | Pontevedra | 13 |
| 4 | (Spain) José Juan Gutiérrez | Las Palmas | 12 |
| 4 | (Spain) José Antonio Zaldúa | Barcelona | 12 |
| 4 | (Spain) Fernando Ansola | Valencia | 12 |
| 4 | (Spain) Justo Gilberto | Las Palmas | 12 |
| 4 | (Spain) Antón Arieta | Atlético Bilbao | 12 |
