= List of River Plate players (25–99 appearances) =

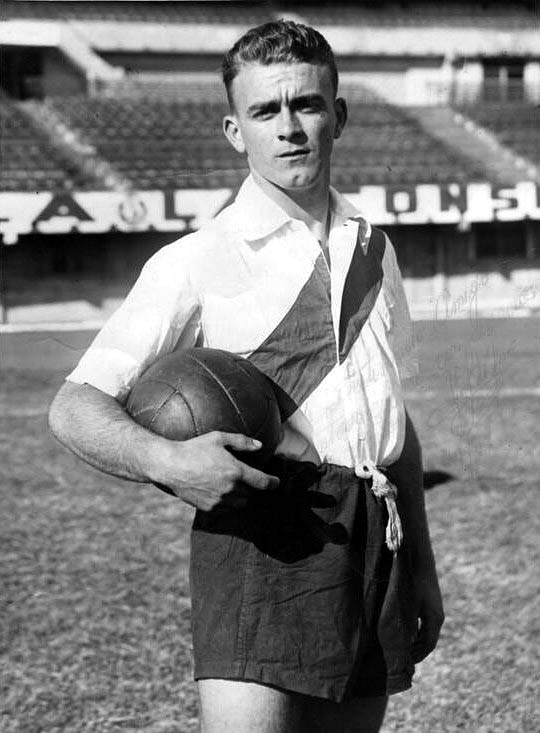
Alfredo Di Stéfano, who scored 51 goals in 70 appearances for River Plate.

Club Atlético River Plate is an Argentine professional football club based in Buenos Aires, who currently play in the Argentine Primera División. The club was formed in 1901, as a result of the merging of football clubs Santa Rosa and La Rosales. River Plate won their first Primera División title in 1920; since then, the club has won a further 37 league titles, along with 16 national cups. At international level, they have been crowned champions of South American football on four occasions, winning the Copa Libertadores in 1986, 1996, 2015 and 2018, and have also won a Worldwide thropy, the 1986 Intercontinental Cup.

Since playing their first competitive match, more than 1300 players have made a competitive first-team appearance for the club, of whom 340 players have made between 25 and 99 appearances. Forward Alberto Gallo and defender Robert Rojas fell one short of 100 appearances for River Plate, as Gallo retired from competitive football in 1952, while Rojas departed for Club Olimpia in 2025. In contrast, nine players have appeared in exactly 25 matches for the club: Emilio Fizel, Jorge Alcalde, Nazareno Luna, Roberto Coll, Tomás Galanzino, José Morroni, Juan José Rossi, Claudio Cabrera and Julio César Caceres. Elias Fernández, who appeared 42 times for the club, became the first River Plate player to represent the Argentina national football team, making his debut in 1909. More than a century later, Franco Mastantuono, who made 64 appearances for the club, debuted as the youngest player to play in an official match for Argentina, at 17 years and 9 months.

== Players ==
- Appearances and goals are for first-team competitive matches only.
- Players are listed according to the date of their first team debut for the club.
- Positions are listed according to the tactical formations that were employed at the time. Thus, the change in the names of defensive and midfield reflects the tactical evolution that occurred from the 1960s onwards.
- Players still actively playing at River Plate are marked with †.
- Statistics correct as of 5 November 2026.

Table headers

- Nationality – If a player played international football, the country/countries he played for are shown. Otherwise, the player's nationality is given as their country of birth.
- Club career– The year of the player's first appearance for River Plate to the year of his last appearance.
- Starts – The number of games started.
- Sub – The number of games played as a substitute. Substitutions were only introduced to the Primera División in the year 1959.
- Total – The total number of games played, both as a starter and as a substitute.

Positions key
Pre-1960s		1960s–	
GK	Goalkeeper		
FB	Full back	DF	Defender
HB	Half back	MF	Midfielder
FW	Forward		
U	Utility player		

River Plate players with 25 to 99 appearances
Player	Nationality	Position	Club career	Starts	Subs	Total	Goals	Ref.
Player	Nationality	Position	Club career	Appearances			Goals	Ref.
Bernardo Messina	Argentina	MF	1905–1912	49	0	49	2	
Pedro Martínez	Argentina	FW	1905–1907	28	0	28	3	
Enrique Zanni	Argentina	FB	1905–1907	28	0	28	0	
Fernando Flores	Argentina	MF	1905–1907	26	0	26	0	
Francesco Priano	Italy	HB	1906–1913	40	0	40	2	
Alejandro Luraschi	Argentina	GK	1907–1910	43	0	43	0	
Anempodisto García	Argentina	HB	1907–1909	37	0	37	7	
Elias Fernández	Argentina	FW	1908–1910	42	0	42	9	
Franco Chagneaud	Argentina	HB	1908–1909	31	0	31	2	
José Morroni	Argentina	HB	1908–1909	25	0	25	1	
Federico Gómez	Argentina	FB	1909–1913	45	0	45	4	
John Diggs	England	FW	1909–1912; 1919	44	0	44	10	
Agustín Lanata	Argentina	FB	1910–1915	73	0	73	4	
Atilio Badaracco	Argentina	FB	1910–1912	44	0	44	2	
Arturo Prandoni	Argentina	FW	1910–1912	35	0	35	19	
Donato Abbatángelo	Argentina	FW	1910–1911	34	0	34	7	
Luis Galeano	Argentina	FW	1910–1913; 1919	28	0	28	3	
Domingo De Ambrosio	Argentina	GK	1911–1913	42	0	42	0	
Adriano Bergogne	Argentina	FW	1911–1913	34	0	34	11	
Alberto Penney	Argentina	HB	1912–1915	69	0	69	32	
Roberto Fraga	Argentina	FW	1913–1917	96	0	96	16	
Enrique Gainzarain	Argentina	HB	1914–1927	90	0	90	22	
Armando J. Risso	Argentina	FW	1914–1920	39	0	39	8	
Francisco Taggino	Argentina	FW	1916–1918	54	0	54	27	
Santiago Ortelli	Argentina	FW	1917–1923	71	0	71	9	
Juan Bautista Crotti	Argentina	GK	1918–1928	78	0	78	0	
José Laiolo	Argentina	FW	1918–1921	73	0	73	37	
Pedro Etchenique	Argentina	HB	1920–1924	93	0	93	2	
Aníbal Arroyuelo	Argentina	FW	1920–1921	39	0	39	13	
Jaime Chavín	Argentina	FW	1920–1921	33	0	33	12	
Tomás Galanzino	Argentina	FW	1920–1921	25	0	25	6	
Fausto Lucarelli	Argentina	FW	1921–1924	69	0	69	35	
Ildefonso Alzúa	Argentina	FW	1921–1925	69	0	69	23	
Maglio Caimi	Argentina	GK	1921–1923	60	0	60	0	
Jerónimo Uriarte	Paraguay	FW	1922–1929	77	0	77	30	
Gustavo González	Argentina	FW	1922–1927	66	0	66	10	
Antonio Traverso	Argentina	FB	1922–1927	35	0	35	0	
Casildo Fallatti	Argentina	HB	1923–1925	68	0	68	12	
Juan Magrini	Argentina	HB	1925–1927	58	0	58	2	
Antonio Ganduglia	Argentina	FW	1925–1931	45	0	45	27	
Eduardo Oliva	Argentina	FW	1925–1927	36	0	36	3	
Ricardo Marchisotti	Argentina	GK	1925–1926	31	0	31	0	
José Penichet	Argentina	FW	1926–1930	92	0	92	30	
Vicente Locaso	Argentina	FW	1926–1932	80	0	80	29	
Moisés Patiño	Argentina	FB	1926–1928	58	0	58	0	
Juan Carlos Irurieta	Argentina	FW	1926–1929	37	0	37	21	
Eugenio Cacopardo	Argentina	HB	1927–1929	26	0	26	1	
Alejandro Giglio	Argentina	HB	1928–1932	69	0	69	11	
Manuel Debatte	Argentina	FW	1928–1930	58	0	58	21	
Andrés Rodríguez	Argentina	FB	1928–1929	32	0	32	1	
José Belvidares	Argentina	FB	1929–1932	75	0	75	0	
Joaquín Bezos	Argentina	FB	1929–1938	51	0	51	0	
Manuel Dañil	Argentina	HB	1931–1933	74	0	74	2	
Juan Poggi	Argentina	GK	1931–1932	34	0	34	0	
Pedro Marassi	Argentina	FW	1931–1932	32	0	32	11	
Roberto Basílico	Argentina	FB	1932–1933	52	0	52	0	
Ricardo Zatelli	Argentina	FW	1932–1934	28	0	28	5	
Juan Gregorio Arrillaga	Argentina	FW	1932–1933	27	0	27	9	
Nazareno Luna	Argentina	FW	1932–1935	25	0	25	8	
Federico Tello	Argentina	FW	1933–1934	44	0	44	16	
Manuel Ferreira	Argentina	FW	1933–1934	35	0	35	15	
Pedro José Chalú	Argentina	HB	1933–1934	27	0	27	3	
José Lamas	Uruguay	FW	1933–1935	26	0	26	9	
Teófilo Juárez	Argentina	FB	1934–1935	56	0	56	0	
Luis María Rongo	Argentina	FW	1935–1940	49	0	49	57	
Eladio Vaschetto	Argentina	FW	1936–1939	75	0	75	31	
Juan Bautista Besuzzo	Uruguay	GK	1938–1939	41	0	41	0	
Alberto Gallo	Argentina	FW	1939–1946; 1952	99	0	99	30	
Roberto D'Alessandro	Argentina	FW	1939–1944	66	0	66	58	
Jorge Alcalde	Peru	FW	1939–1940	25	0	25	12	
Julio Barrios	Uruguay	GK	1941–1943	67	0	67	0	
Avelino Cadilla	Uruguay	FB	1941–1942	34	0	34	0	
Santiago Kelly	Argentina	FB	1942–1950	45	0	45	0	
Joaquín Martínez	Argentina	FW	1943–1947	26	0	27	10	
Héctor Ferrari	Argentina	U	1944–1953	94	0	94	1	
José Eusebio Soriano	Peru	GK	1944–1946	76	0	76	0	
Héctor Grisetti	Argentina	GK	1944–1948	54	0	54	0	
Alfredo Di Stéfano	Argentina; Spain	FW	1945–1949	70	0	70	51	
Manuel Giúdice	Argentina	HB	1945–1946	29	0	29	2	
Roberto Coll	Argentina	FW	1945–1950	25	0	25	7	
Hugo Reyes	Argentina	FW	1947–1949	45	0	45	17	
Guillermo Fain	Argentina	FB	1948–1950; 1954–1955	27	0	27	0	
Emilio Fizel	Argentina	FW	1948–1950	25	0	25	15	
César Castagno	Argentina	HB	1949–1950	50	0	50	0	
Juan José Negri	Argentina	FW	1949–1950	31	0	31	6	
Roberto Tesouro	Argentina	HB	1951–1956	53	0	53	0	
Juan José Pizzuti	Argentina	FW	1951	30	0	30	9	
Bernardo Guastavino	Argentina	FB	1953–1954	38	0	38	0	
Omar Sívori	Argentina; Italy	FW	1954–1957	63	0	63	29	
Manuel Ovejero	Argentina	GK	1956–1961	32	0	32	0	
Juan Urriolabeitia	Argentina	HB	1957–1960	85	0	85	4	
Héctor de Bourgoing	Argentina; France	FW	1957–1959	53	0	53	22	
Emilio Melón	Argentina	FW	1957–1959	29	0	29	4	
Juan Carlos Schneider	Argentina	HB	1958–1961	56	0	56	0	
Julio Nuín	Argentina	FB	1958–1959	48	0	48	7	
Juan Carlos Malazzo	Argentina	HB	1958–1959	33	1	34	0	
Óscar Gómez Sánchez	Peru	FW	1959–1960	42	0	42	3	
Roberto Frojuello	Brazil	FW	1961–1963	68	0	68	11	
Moacir	Brazil	FW	1961	28	0	28	8	
Vladislao Cap	Argentina	DF	1962–1965	92	0	92	1	
Luis Artime	Argentina	FW	1962–1965	80	0	80	67	
Martín Pando	Argentina	MF	1962–1964	53	0	53	6	
Eduardo Grispo	Argentina	DF	1963–1967	45	1	46	1	
Hugo Gatti	Argentina	GK	1964–1968	88	3	91	0	
Juan Carlos Lallana	Argentina	FW	1964–1967	69	0	69	33	
Roberto Zywica	Argentina	MF	1966–1968	66	1	67	2	
Daniel Bayo	Argentina	MF	1966–1967	49	1	50	7	
Roberto Morcillo	Argentina	DF	1966–1970	46	1	47	0	
Rubén Paira	Argentina	DF	1966–1972	35	1	36	0	
Miguel Ángel Loayza	Peru	FW	1966	31	0	31	14	
Juan Aníbal Bordón	Paraguay	DF	1966–1967	26	1	27	0	
Ricardo Montivero	Argentina	MF	1967–1970	73	7	80	12	
Roberto Gutiérrez	Argentina	FW	1967–1970	42	5	47	5	
Miguel Ángel López	Argentina	DF	1968–1970	90	0	90	1	
Roberto Ferreiro	Argentina	DF	1968–1970	86	0	86	0	
Carlos Rodríguez	Argentina	MF	1968–1970	63	3	66	12	
Juan Carlos Trebucq	Argentina	FW	1969–1971	53	11	64	11	
Hugo Carballo	Argentina	GK	1969–1971	62	0	62	0	
Osvaldo Pérez	Argentina	DF	1970–1974	85	11	96	2	
Jorge Luis Ghiso	Argentina	FW	1970–1975	75	16	91	11	
Raúl Giustozzi	Argentina	DF	1970–1973	72	6	78	5	
Néstor Scotta	Argentina	FW	1970–1972	36	14	50	12	
Ricardo Pellerano	Argentina	DF	1970–1973	42	2	44	1	
Joaquín Pedro Martínez	Argentina	FW	1970–1973	36	4	40	9	
Ramiro Pérez	Argentina	MF	1970–1971	24	7	31	2	
Carlos Barisio	Argentina	GK	1970–1974	25	1	26	0	
Pablo Zuccarini	Argentina	DF	1971–1974	82	8	90	2	
René Daulte	Argentina	DF	1971–1973	77	4	81	8	
Carlos Della Savia	Argentina	MF	1971	38	1	39	2	
Héctor Pignani	Argentina	FW	1971	34	0	34	3	
Héctor Isaac Rodríguez	Argentina	DF	1971–1973	32	2	34	0	
Jorge Omar Vázquez	Uruguay	MF	1971–1973	27	4	31	0	
Carlos Bulla	Argentina	FW	1971	12	18	30	3	
Víctor Bottaníz	Argentina	DF	1971–1974	24	2	26	0	
Ernesto Mastrángelo	Argentina	FW	1972–1974	86	8	94	34	
Carlos Ángel López	Argentina	MF	1972–1973	36	22	58	11	
Baudilio Jáuregui	Uruguay	DF	1973–1974	56	2	58	0	
Edgardo Di Meola	Argentina	FW	1973–1974	33	12	45	8	
Enrique Wolff	Argentina	DF	1973–1974	42	0	42	6	
Carlos Avanzi	Argentina	MF	1973–1974	14	16	30	1	
Jorge Coudannes	Argentina	MF	1974–1978	27	12	39	2	
Luis Landaburu	Argentina	GK	1975–1980	68	4	72	0	
José Reinaldi	Argentina	FW	1975–1976	27	18	45	14	
Miguel Ángel Raimondo	Argentina	MF	1975	37	5	42	0	
Pedro Bareiro	Paraguay	FW	1975	21	7	28	4	
Rodolfo Raffaeli	Argentina	FB	1975–1978	28	0	28	1	
Omar Labruna	Argentina	MF	1976–1981	32	13	45	2	
Hugo Coscia	Argentina	FW	1977–1978	34	6	40	5	
Héctor Pitarch	Argentina	MF	1977–1978	17	10	27	2	
Rubén Galletti	Argentina	FW	1978–1979	30	28	58	14	
Horacio Rodríguez	Argentina	DF	1978–1980	46	9	55	0	
Claudio Giúdice	Argentina	DF	1978–1983	36	7	43	0	
Francisco Azzolini	Argentina	DF	1978–1980	36	4	40	0	
Héctor Sosa	Argentina	FW	1978–1979	22	5	27	6	
Alfredo de los Santos	Uruguay	DF	1979–1984	53	11	64	2	
Juan Ramón Carrasco	Uruguay	MF	1979–1980	31	12	43	15	
José Maria Vieta	Argentina	MF	1980–1983	39	19	58	12	
Roberto Gordon	Argentina	FW	1980–1983	15	13	28	9	
Daniel Messina	Argentina	MF	1981–1983	57	13	70	2	
Enzo Bulleri	Argentina	MF	1981–1983	57	1	58	11	
Jorge Tévez	Argentina	FW	1981–1983	23	11	34	7	
Pedro Vega	Argentina	MF	1981–1983	15	19	34	6	
Mario Kempes	Argentina	FW	1981	32	0	32	16	
Omar Alegre	Argentina	MF	1981–1983	17	9	26	2	
Sergio Goycochea	Argentina	GK	1982–1988; 1993–1994	82	3	85	0	
Enrique Nieto	Argentina	DF	1982–1983	69	2	71	2	
Carlos Karabín	Argentina	DF	1982–1986	47	7	54	3	
Raúl de la Cruz Chaparro	Argentina	FW	1982–1983	35	6	41	11	
Gabriel Puentedura	Argentina	GK	1982–1983	40	1	41	0	
Carlos Randazzo	Argentina	FW	1982–1983	24	3	27	2	
Claudio Cabrera	Argentina	MF	1982–1983	14	11	25	1	
Pedro Troglio	Argentina	MF	1983–1988	47	16	63	1	
Alberto Bica	Uruguay	FW	1983–1984	61	1	62	6	
Daniel Teglia	Argentina	FW	1984	39	4	43	11	
Enrique Villalba	Paraguay	FW	1984	21	6	27	4	
Claudio Morresi	Argentina	MF	1985–1988	58	21	79	27	
Claudio Caniggia	Argentina	FW	1985–1988	53	8	61	8	
Luis Amuchástegui	Argentina	FW	1985–1986	45	3	48	19	
Jorge Villazán	Uruguay	FW	1985–1989	28	17	45	9	
Nelson Gutiérrez	Uruguay	DF	1986–1988	83	0	83	4	
Ramón Centurión	Argentina	FW	1986–1989	48	21	69	23	
José Miguel	Argentina	GK	1986–1995	49	3	52	0	
Pablo Erbín	Argentina	DF	1986–1988	42	2	44	3	
Patricio Hernández	Argentina	MF	1986–1987	31	4	35	12	
Rubén Darío Gómez	Argentina	DF	1986–1990	33	0	33	0	
Juan Gilberto Funes	Argentina	FW	1986–1987	27	2	29	5	
Jorge da Silva	Uruguay	FW	1987–1989	62	2	64	25	
Omar Palma	Argentina	MF	1987–1989	52	2	54	7	
Julio Zamora	Argentina	FW	1988–1990	37	19	56	11	
Sergio Batista	Argentina	MF	1988–1990	54	0	54	2	
José Serrizuela	Argentina	DF	1988–1990	47	4	51	8	
Abel Balbo	Argentina	FW	1988–1989	37	1	38	12	
Oscar Passet	Argentina	GK	1988–1991	34	0	34	0	
Fabio Talarico	Argentina	MF	1988–1990	14	12	26	3	
Jorge Gabriel Vázquez	Argentina	MF	1989–1993	58	13	71	6	
Javier Claut	Argentina	MF	1990–1993	24	13	37	2	
Juan Amador Sánchez	Argentina	DF	1990–1992	37	0	37	0	
Diego Cocca	Argentina	DF	1990–1994	26	7	33	1	
Juan José Rossi	Argentina	MF	1990–1991	17	8	25	1	
Fernando Cáceres	Argentina	DF	1992–1993	64	0	64	2	
Claudio Rojas	Guatemala	MF	1992–1994	18	10	28	0	
Hernán Crespo	Argentina	FW	1993–1996	60	25	85	36	
Javier Sodero	Argentina	GK	1993–1995	55	2	57	0	
Facundo Villalba	Argentina	FW	1993–1997	25	22	47	9	
Gabriel Amato	Argentina	FW	1994–1996	60	38	98	20	
Roberto Ayala	Argentina	DF	1994–1995	51	0	51	1	
Juan Andrés Gómez	Argentina	MF	1995–1996	36	6	42	3	
José María Paz	Argentina	DF	1995–2001	24	5	29	1	
Roberto Monserrat	Argentina	MF	1996–1998	65	6	71	13	
Julio Cruz	Argentina	FW	1996–1997	32	4	36	18	
Roberto Trotta	Argentina	DF	1997–2000	72	7	79	7	
Sebastián Rambert	Argentina	FW	1997–2000	44	19	63	8	
Damián Álvarez	Argentina; Mexico	MF	1998–2002	52	41	93	13	
Carlos Netto	Argentina	MF	1998–1999	40	18	58	7	
Marcelo Gómez	Argentina	MF	1998–1999	34	18	52	1	
Cristian Castillo	Argentina	FW	1998–2000	26	25	51	17	
Juan Antonio Pizzi	Argentina; Spain	FW	1998–1999	29	7	36	11	
Javier Gandolfi	Argentina	DF	1998–2005	30	5	35	0	
Gabriel Pereyra	Argentina	MF	1998–2004	22	9	31	0	
Leonardo Ramos	Uruguay	U	1999–2000	41	14	55	3	
Ariel Franco	Argentina	U	1999–2002	30	25	55	1	
Claudio Husaín	Argentina	MF	2000–2004	57	8	65	3	
Diego Barrado	Argentina	MF	2001–2010	52	39	91	8	
Maxi López	Argentina	FW	2001–2004	39	31	70	16	
Martín Demichelis	Argentina	DF	2001–2003	63	7	70	3	
Daniel Ludueña	Argentina	FW	2001–2004	25	33	58	4	
Matías Lequi	Argentina	DF	2001–2003	41	12	53	3	
Esteban Cambiasso	Argentina	MF	2001–2002	41	5	46	14	
Alejandro Domínguez	Argentina	MF	2002–2003; 2011–2012	65	12	77	16	
Gastón Fernández	Argentina	FW	2002–2005	37	25	62	7	
Esteban Fuertes	Argentina	FW	2002–2003	32	13	45	16	
José María Buljubasich	Argentina	GK	2002–2003	26	0	26	0	
Daniel Montenegro	Argentina	MF	2003–2006	55	34	89	18	
Horacio Ameli	Argentina	DF	2003–2005	86	0	86	8	
Rubens Sambueza	Argentina	MF	2003–2009	50	29	79	6	
Javier Mascherano	Argentina	MF	2003–2005	63	8	71	1	
Cristian Nasuti	Argentina	DF	2003–2008	64	3	67	3	
Lucas Mareque	Argentina	DF	2003–2006	51	8	59	2	
Osmar Ferreyra	Argentina	MF	2003–2004; 2013–2015	25	28	53	3	
René Lima	Argentina	MF	2003–2007	29	24	53	0	
Cristian Tula	Argentina	DF	2003–2006	26	6	32	2	
Darío Husaín	Argentina	MF	2003	14	16	30	4	
José Sand	Argentina	FW	2004–2005	27	30	57	11	
Jairo Patiño	Colombia	MF	2004–2006	31	22	53	5	
Juan Fernández	Argentina	DF	2004	23	3	26	0	
Ernesto Farías	Argentina	FW	2005–2007	86	9	95	49	
Nicolás Domingo	Argentina	MF	2005–2009; 2011–2012; 2016–2017	65	21	86	2	
Federico Domínguez	Argentina	DF	2005–2007	53	6	59	7	
Gonzalo Higuaín	France; Argentina	FW	2005–2006	32	9	41	15	
Jonathan Santana	Argentina; Paraguay	MF	2005–2006	31	3	34	9	
Leonardo Talamonti	Argentina	MF	2005–2006	32	0	32	2	
Diego Galván	Argentina	MF	2005–2007	14	15	29	3	
Andrés San Martín	Argentina	MF	2005–2006	21	6	27	1	
Cristian Álvarez	Chile	DF	2005–2006	25	2	27	0	
Augusto Fernández	Argentina	MF	2006–2010	77	21	98	3	
Fernando Belluschi	Argentina	MF	2006–2007	57	5	62	13	
Federico Lussenhoff	Argentina	DF	2006–2007	31	1	32	1	
Julio César Cáceres	Paraguay	DF	2006	25	0	25	0	
Mauro Rosales	Argentina	FW	2007–2010	43	38	81	5	
Daniel Vega	Argentina	GK	2007–2012	78	2	80	0	
Nicolás Sánchez	Argentina	DF	2007–2010	67	3	70	0	
Andrés Ríos	Argentina	FW	2007–2012	22	41	63	7	
Facundo Affranchino	Argentina	MF	2007–2012	17	22	39	2	
Juan Ojeda	Argentina	GK	2007–2010	36	1	37	0	
Marco Ruben	Argentina	FW	2007	25	11	36	7	
Alexis Sánchez	Chile	FW	2007–2008	17	14	31	4	
Gustavo Cabral	Argentina	DF	2008–2010	69	2	71	4	
Mauro Díaz	Argentina	MF	2008–2013	30	29	59	3	
Leandro Chichizola	Argentina	GK	2008–2014	34	2	36	0	
Gustavo Bou	Argentina	FW	2008–2012	11	22	33	3	
Rodrigo Archubi	Argentina	MF	2008–2009	17	14	31	2	
Sebastián Abreu	Uruguay	FW	2008	27	2	29	12	
Facundo Quiroga	Argentina	DF	2008–2010	29	0	29	1	
Martín Galmarini	Argentina	MF	2008–2010	17	10	27	1	
Daniel Villalva	Argentina	FW	2009–2014	22	42	64	8	
Roberto Pereyra	Argentina	MF	2009–2011	34	11	45	0	
Erik Lamela	Argentina	FW	2009–2011	33	3	36	4	
Cristian Fabbiani	Argentina	FW	2009	20	12	32	3	
Alexis Ferrero	Argentina	DF	2010–2011	61	5	66	0	
Ezequiel Cirigliano	Argentina	MF	2010–2014	52	13	65	0	
Juan Manuel Díaz	Uruguay	DF	2010–2012	57	3	60	2	
Adalberto Román	Paraguay	DF	2010–2013	35	0	35	3	
Mariano Pavone	Argentina	FW	2010–2011	28	6	34	10	
Carlos Arano	Argentina	DF	2010–2012	24	5	29	0	
Walter Acevedo	Argentina	MF	2010–2013	26	3	29	0	
Martín Aguirre	Argentina	MF	2011–2015	24	22	46	6	
Lucas Ocampos	Argentina	FW	2011–2012	32	8	40	7	
Luciano Abecasis	Argentina	MF	2011–2013	24	4	28	0	
Augusto Solari	Argentina	U	2012–2015	26	25	51	1	
David Trezeguet	France	FW	2012–2013	30	7	37	17	
Jonathan Bottinelli	Argentina	DF	2012–2013	30	6	36	1	
Carlos Luna	Argentina	FW	2012–2013	14	12	26	6	
Éder Álvarez Balanta	Colombia	DF	2013–2016	81	2	83	3	
Teófilo Gutiérrez	Colombia	FW	2013–2015	67	3	70	28	
Carlos Carbonero	Colombia	MF	2013–2014	36	6	42	8	
Giovanni Simeone	Argentina	FW	2013–2015	10	23	33	4	
Emanuel Mammana	Argentina	DF	2014–2016; 2022–2023	68	8	76	4	
Leonardo Pisculichi	Argentina	MF	2014–2016	56	17	73	10	
Lucas Boyé	Argentina	FW	2014–2015	15	22	37	2	
Exequiel Palacios	Argentina	MF	2015–2019	61	26	87	10	
Lucas Alario	Argentina	FW	2015–2017	74	8	82	41	
Augusto Batalla	Argentina	GK	2015–2017	50	1	51	0	
Tabaré Viudez	Uruguay	MF	2015–2016	12	15	27	1	
Jorge Moreira	Paraguay	DF	2016–2020	58	0	58	2	
Iván Alonso	Uruguay	FW	2016–2017	12	27	39	7	
Tomás Andrade	Argentina	MF	2016–2017	8	25	33	0	
Ignacio Scocco	Argentina	FW	2017–2020	48	42	90	38	
Cristian Ferreira	Argentina	MF	2017–2022	14	33	47	6	
Carlos Auzqui	Argentina	FW	2017–2018	18	24	42	4	
Marcelo Saracchi	Uruguay	DF	2017–2018	29	1	30	1	
Lucas Beltrán †	Argentina	FW	2018–2023; 2026–	57	37	94	24	
David Martínez	Argentina; Paraguay	DF	2018; 2021–2024	65	12	77	2	
Federico Girotti	Argentina	FW	2018–2021	9	40	49	8	
Robert Rojas	Paraguay	DF	2019–2023	89	10	99	11	
Jorge Carrascal	Colombia	FW	2019–2021	37	44	81	9	
Fabrizio Angileri	Argentina	DF	2019–2021	61	8	69	4	
Enzo Fernández	Argentina	MF	2019–2022	43	10	53	12	
Benjamín Rollheiser	Argentina	MF	2019–2021	14	20	34	1	
José Paradela	Argentina	MF	2021–2023	28	58	86	7	
Braian Romero	Argentina	FW	2021–2022	28	24	52	15	
Tomás Galván †	Argentina	MF	2021–	40	11	51	7	
Marcelo Herrera	Argentina	DF	2022–2024	62	18	80	3	
Elías Gómez	Argentina	DF	2022–2023	31	6	37	1	
Enzo Díaz	Argentina	DF	2023–2024	67	11	78	1	
Claudio Echeverri	Argentina	MF	2023–2024	32	16	48	4	
Salomón Rondón	Venezuela	FW	2023	18	17	35	10	
Franco Mastantuono	Argentina	MF	2024–2025	34	30	64	10	
Rodrigo Villagra	Argentina	MF	2024	22	14	36	0	
Nicolás Fonseca	Italy; Uruguay	MF	2024	17	11	28	1	
Ian Subiabre	Argentina	FW	2024–2026	17	27	44	3	
Fabricio Bustos	Argentina	DF	2024–2026	46	7	53	0	
Maximiliano Meza	Argentina	MF	2024–2026	33	15	48	8	
Santiago Lencina	Argentina	MF	2024–2026	13	18	31	3	
Marcos Acuña †	Argentina	DF	2024–	76	8	84	3	
Lautaro Rivero †	Argentina	DF	2025–	43	3	46	2	
Giuliano Galoppo	Argentina	MF	2025–2026	27	21	48	8	
Kevin Castaño	Colombia	MF	2025–2026	37	8	45	0	
Maximiliano Salas	Argentina	FW	2025–2026	23	14	37	7	
Joaquín Freitas	Argentina	FW	2025–2026	12	18	30	1	
Santiago Beltrán †	Argentina	GK	2026–	44	1	45	0	
Aníbal Moreno †	Argentina	MF	2026–	32	1	33	0	
Fausto Vera †	Argentina	MF	2026–	30	4	34	1	
Juan Cruz Meza †	Argentina	MF	2025–	9	21	30	0	
