= 1970 Club Atlético River Plate season =

River Plate
1970 season
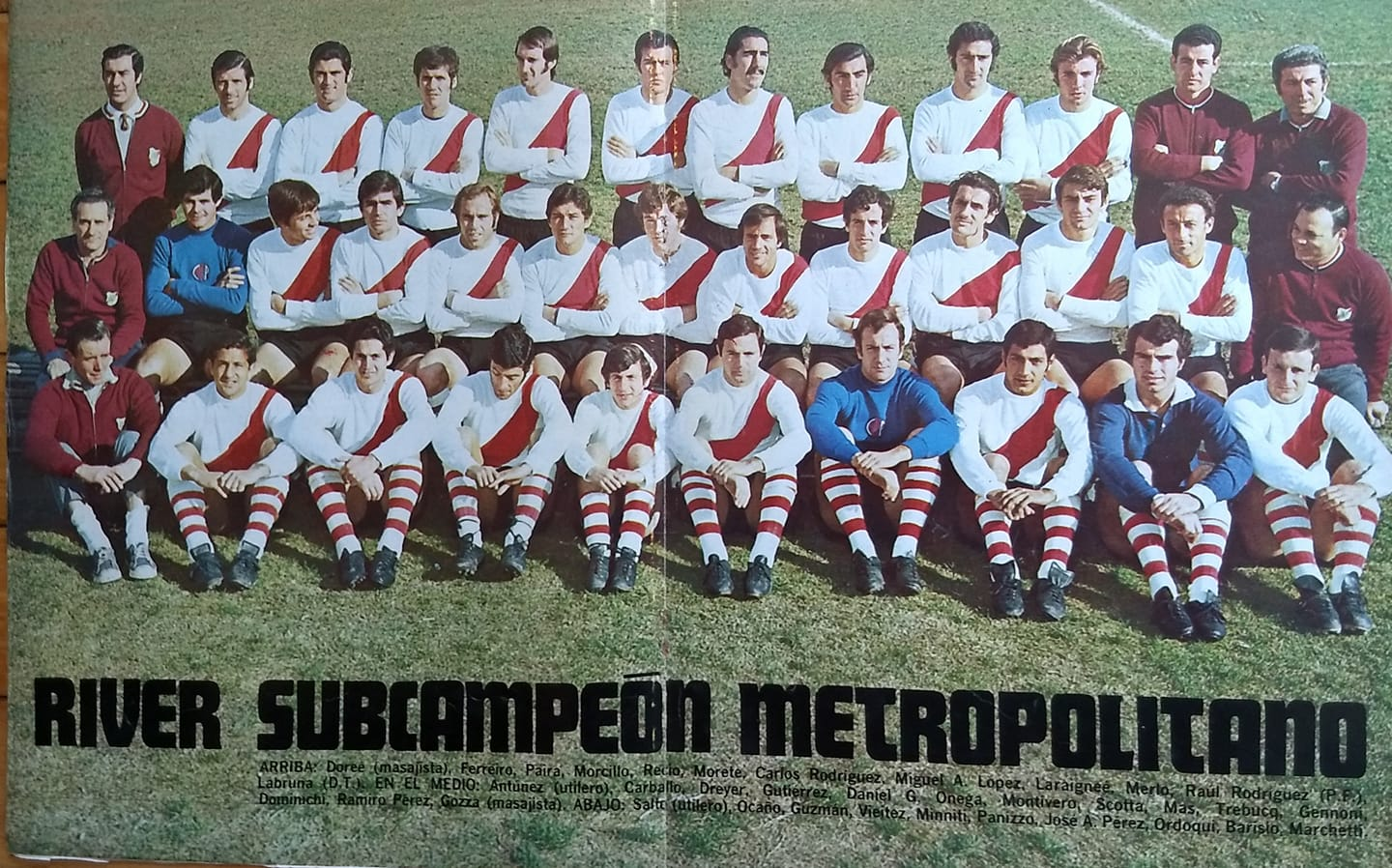
- President: Julián Kent
- Manager: Ángel Labruna; Osvaldo Diez (interim); Didi
- Argentine Primera División: Metropolitano: Runner-up; Nacional: Third place
- 1970 Copa Libertadores: Third phase
- Top goalscorer: League: All: Oscar Más (20)
- Biggest win: River 9–0 Universitario (B)
- Biggest defeat: Nacional 6–1 River
Home colours	Away colours

The 1970 season is River Plate's 68th season in the Argentine Primera División. The season was split into two tournaments with the Torneo Metropolitano from 20 March to 19 December and the Torneo Nacional from 4 September to 27 December.

== Season summary ==
River Plate fared well throughout the 1970 season under Ángel Labruna in the first half and later under Brazilian manager Didi in the second half. They would end up as runners-up in the Torneo Metropolitano as well as narrowly miss qualification for the semifinals of the Torneo Nacional, ending in third place within Group A of the tournament.

== Squad ==
Note: Flags indicate national team as defined under FIFA eligibility rules; some limited exceptions apply. Players may hold more than one non-FIFA nationality.

No.	Pos.	Nation	Player
—	GK	ARG	Carlos Barisio
—	GK	ARG	Hugo Carballo
—	GK	ARG	José Alberto Pérez
—	DF	ARG	Jorge Dominichi
—	DF	ARG	Roberto Ferreiro
—	DF	ARG	César Laraignée
—	DF	ARG	Miguel Ángel López
—	DF	ARG	Rubén Paira
—	DF	ARG	Ricardo Pellerano
—	DF	ARG	Jorge Recio
—	DF	ARG	Carlos Manuel Rodríguez
—	DF	ARG	Francisco Sá
—	DF	ARG	Daniel Silguero
—	DF	ARG	Abel Vieytez
—	DF	ARG	Roberto Morcillo
—	DF	ARG	Juan Carlos Guzmán
—	DF	ARG	Carlos Raúl Panizo
—	DF	ARG	Oscar Ordoqui

No.	Pos.	Nation	Player
—	MF	ARG	Eduardo Anzarda
—	MF	ARG	Eduardo Dreyer
—	MF	ARG	Enzo Gennoni
—	MF	ARG	Jorge Ghiso
—	MF	ARG	Reinaldo Merlo
—	MF	ARG	Daniel Onega
—	MF	ARG	Roberto Gutiérrez
—	MF	ARG	Ramiro Pérez
—	FW	ARG	Norberto Alonso
—	FW	ARG	Víctor Marchetti
—	FW	ARG	Héctor Minitti
—	FW	ARG	Ricardo Montivero
—	FW	ARG	Oscar Más
—	FW	ARG	Carlos Morete
—	FW	ARG	José Enrique Ocaño
—	FW	ARG	Néstor Scotta
—	FW	ARG	Juan Carlos Trebucq
—	FW	ARG	Joaquín Martínez

== Match results ==
=== Torneo Metropolitano ===
22 March 1970 1	Colón	3–1	River Plate	Estanislao López, Santa Fe
	Valledor ?'; Borgogno ?', ?' (pen.)	Report	Onega ?'; Más ?' (pen.)	Referee: Humberto Dellacasa

26 March 1970 2	River Plate	3–3	Quilmes	Estadio Monumental, Belgrano
	Onega ?'; Más ?'; Scotta ?'	Report	Savia ?'; Cottón ?' (pen.); Leeb ?'	Referee: Teodoro Nitti

29 March 1970 3	River Plate	0–2	Rosario Central	Estadio Monumental, Belgrano
		Report	Zavagno ?'; Gramajo ?'	Referee: Arturo Ithurralde

5 April 1970 4	Huracán	2–4	River Plate	Tomás Adolfo Ducó, Parque Patricios
	Giribet ?' (pen.), ?'	Report	C. M. Rodríguez ?'; Más ?' (pen.), ?'; Scotta ?'	Referee: Ángel N. Coerezza

5 April 1970 5	Newell's Old Boys	1–1	River Plate	Coloso del Parque, Rosario
	Scotta ?'	Report	Zanabria ?'	Referee: Luis Pestarino

19 April 1970 6	River Plate	2–2	San Lorenzo de Almagro	Estadio Monumental, Belgrano
	Scotta ?'; Más ?'	Report	Fischer ?' (pen.), ?'	Referee: Andrés W. Mateo

26 April 1970 7	Free round
	Report

3 May 1970 8	Platense	0–2	River Plate	Manuela Pedraza y Crámer, Núñez
		Report	Juan Carlos Trebucq ?', ?'	Referee: Atilio García

10 May 1970 9	River Plate	1–1	Vélez Sarsfield	Estadio Monumental, Belgrano
	Laraignée ?' (pen.)	Report	Oruezábal ?'	Referee: Miguel A. F. Comesaña

17 May 1970 10	River Plate	1–1	Argentinos Juniors	Estadio Monumental, Belgrano
	Más ?'	Report	Ribaudo ?'	Referee: Oscar Veiró

24 May 1970 11	Banfield	0–1	River Plate	Florencio Sola, Banfield
		Report	Más ?'	Referee: Claudio Busca

28 May 1970 12	Racing Club	1–2	River Plate	El Cilindro, Avellaneda
	Carone ?'	Report	Onega ?', ?'	Referee: Claudio Busca

31 May 1970 13	River Plate	4–1	Gimnasia y Esgrima La Plata	Estadio Monumental, Belgrano
	Onega ?', ?', ?'; Rezza ?' (o.g.)	Report	Onnis ?'	Referee: Teodoro Nitti

5 June 1970 14	Chacarita Juniors	1–1	River Plate	Chacarita Juniors, Villa Crespo
	Eresuma ?'	Report	C. M. Rodríguez ?'	Referee: Juan C. Casayouz

12 June 1970 15	Boca Juniors	1–0	River Plate	La Bombonera, La Boca
	Suñé ?' (pen.)	Report		Referee: Aníbal Lugones

19 June 1970 16	River Plate	3–1	Lanús	Estadio Monumental, Belgrano
	Más ?', ?'; C. M. Rodríguez ?'	Report	Bentrón ?' (pen.)	Referee: Oscar García

28 June 1970 17	River Plate	3–1	Independiente	Estadio Monumental, Belgrano
	Más ?', ?'; Onega ?'	Report	Yazalde ?'	Referee: Roberto Barreiro

5 July 1970 18	Estudiantes de la Plata	0–2	River Plate	Jorge Luis Hirschi, La Plata
		Report	Morete ?'; Más ?'	Referee: Teodoro Nitti

12 July 1970 19	Atlanta	1–1	River Plate	León Kolbowski, Villa Crespo
	de la Iglesia ?'	Report	Más ?' (pen.)	Referee: Aníbal Lugones

19 July 1970 20	River Plate	3–2	Los Andes	Estadio Monumental, Belgrano
	Más ?' (pen.); R. Pérez ?'; Morete ?'	Report	Yazalde ?'	Referee: Roberto Barreiro

21 July 1970 21	River Plate	6–0	Unión de Santa Fe	Estadio Monumental, Belgrano
	R. Pérez ?'; Morete ?'; Más ?', ?'; Montivero ?'; Onega ?'	Report		Referee: Jorge Álvarez

=== Torneo Nacional ===
==== Group A ====
6 September 1970 1	San Martín de Tucumán	0–2	River Plate	Estadio La Ciudadela, Tucumán
		Report	Morete ?'; Onega ?'	Referee: Claudio Busca

13 September 1970 2	River Plate	2–1	Gimnasia y Esgrima La Plata	Estadio Monumental, Belgrano
	Montivero ?', ?'	Report	Masnik ?'	Referee: Oscar Veiró

20 September 1970 3	Platense	1–2	River Plate	Manuela Pedraza y Crámer, Núñez
	Bulla ?'	Report	R. Gutiérrez ?'; Onega ?'	Referee: Luis Pestarino

27 September 1970 4	River Plate	2–1	Boca Juniors	Estadio Monumental, Belgrano
	Montivero ?', ?'	Report	Peña ?'	Referee: Oscar Veiró

4 October 1970 5	River Plate	1–1	Racing Club	Estadio Monumental, Belgrano
	Montivero ?'	Report	Rocchia ?'	Referee: Alberto Ducatelli

8 October 1970 6	San Lorenzo de Almagro	3–1	River Plate	Gasómetro, Boedo
	Cocco ?'; Heredia ?'; P. González ?'	Report	Laraignée ?'	Referee: Eduardo Furlani

12 October 1970 7	River Plate	1–0	Newell's Old Boys	Estadio Monumental, Belgrano
	R. Gutiérrez ?'	Report		Referee: Juan C. Casayouz

18 October 1970 8	Talleres de Córdoba	1–1	River Plate	Estadio La Boutique, Córdoba
	Cornejo ?'	Report	Onega ?'	Referee: Juan Carlos Casayouz

25 October 1970 9	Chacarita Juniors	1–0	River Plate	Chacarita Juniors, Villa Crespo
	Orife ?'	Report		Referee: Juan Carlos Casayouz

28 October 1970 10	River Plate	2–1	Gimnasia y Esgrima de Mendoza	Estadio Monumental, Belgrano
	Onega ?', ?'	Report	Ibañez ?'	Referee: Miguel A. F. Comesaña

31 October 1970 11	River Plate	3–0	San Martín de Tucumán	Estadio Monumental, Belgrano
	Trebucq ?', ?'; Scotta ?'	Report		Referee: Eduardo Furlani

8 November 1970 12	Gimnasia y Esgrima La Plata	2–1	River Plate	Juan Carmelo Zerillo, La Plata
	Delio Onnis ?', ?'	Report	Onega ?'	Referee: Oscar García

11 November 1970 13	River Plate	2–0	Platense	Estadio Monumental, Belgrano
	Laraignée ?' (pen.), ?'	Report		Referee: Roberto Goicoechea

8 November 1970 14	Boca Juniors	0–0	River Plate	La Bombonera, La Boca
		Report		Referee: Miguel A. F. Comesaña

22 November 1970 15	Racing Club	0–2	River Plate	El Cilindro, Avellaneda
		Report	Anzarda ?', ?'	Referee: Roberto Goicoechea

29 November 1970 16	River Plate	2–1	San Lorenzo	Estadio Monumental, Belgrano
	Onega ?', ?'	Report	Albrecht ?' (pen.)	Referee: Roberto Barreiro

22 November 1970 17	Newell's Old Boys	2–2	River Plate	El Coloso del Parque, Rosario
	Bezerra ?'; Marcos ?'	Report	Laraignée ?'; Marchetti ?'	Referee: Juan Carlos Rodríguez

29 November 1970 18	River Plate	2–1	Talleres de Córdoba	Estadio Monumental, Belgrano
	Laraignée ?'; Más ?'	Report	José López ?'	Referee: Juan C. Rodríguez

13 December 1970 19	River Plate	1–2	Chacarita Juniors	Estadio Monumental, Belgrano
	Anzarda ?'	Report	García Cambón ?'; Á. Marcos ?'	Referee: Ángel N. Coerezza

16 December 1970 20	Gimnasia y Esgrima de Mendoza	2–1	River Plate	Víctor Legrotaglie, Mendoza
	Fernández ?'; Jorge Luna ?'	Report	Más ?'	Referee: Delio B. Leiró

=== Copa Libertadores ===
==== Group Stage ====
17 February 1970 1	River Plate	1–3	Boca Juniors	Estadio Monumental, Belgrano
	Gennoni 28'	Report	Villagra 17'; Coch 79', 90'	Referee: Luis Pestarino (Argentina)

1 March 1970 2	Universitario de La Paz	0–2	River Plate	Hernando Siles, La Paz
		Report	Trebucq 35'; Gennoni 52'	Referee: Armando Peña Rocha (Uruguay)

5 March 1970 3	Bolívar	1–1	River Plate	Hernando Siles, La Paz
	Tercilla 80'	Report	Montivero 75'	Referee: Armando Peña Rocha (Uruguay)

11 March 1970 4	River Plate	9–0	Universitario de La Paz	Estadio Monumental, Belgrano
	Más 5' (pen.), 27', 60', 87'; Onega 7', 62', 85'; Merlo 24'; Montivero 84'	Report		Referee: César Orozco (Perú)

15 March 1970 5	River Plate	1–0	Bolívar	Estadio Monumental, Belgrano
	Onega 60'	Report		Referee: Ramón Barreto (Uruguay)

19 March 1970 6	Boca Juniors	2–1	River Plate	La Bombonera, La Boca
	Larrosa 15'; Savoy 40'	Report	Onega 80'	Referee: Roberto Barreiro (Argentina)

==== Second Phase ====
11 April 1970 1	Universitario de Deportes	1–2	River Plate	La Bombonera, La Boca
	Rojas 70'	Report	Más 5'; Scotta 8'	Referee: Ramón Barreto (Uruguay)

19 April 1970 2	River Plate	1–0	Boca Juniors	Estadio Monumental, Belgrano
	C. Rodríguez 33'	Report		Referee: Jorge Álvarez (Argentina)

25 April 1970 3	River Plate	5–3	Universitario de Deportes	Estadio Monumental, Belgrano
	Más 17', 32', 36'; Scotta 44'; Daniel Onega 49'	Report	Soria 12'; Rojas 24'; Bailetti 71'	Referee: Héctor F. Ortiz (Paraguay)

30 April 1970 4	Boca Juniors	1–1	River Plate	La Bombonera, La Boca
	Rojas 81'	Report	Onega 63'	Referee: Roberto Barreiro (Argentina)

==== Third Phase ====
7 May 1970 First leg	River Plate	0–1	Estudiantes de La Plata	Estadio Monumental, Belgrano
		Report	Verón 52'	Referee: Miguel Ángel Comesaña (Argentina)

15 May 1970 Second leg	Estudiantes de La Plata	1–3	River Plate	Jorge Luis Hirschi, La Plata
	Solari 48'; Verón 52'; Echecopar 81'	Report	Más 46'	Referee: Roberto Barreiro (Argentina)

=== Friendlies ===
==== Copa Montevideo ====
19 January 1970 1	Nacional	6–1	River Plate	Centenario, Montevideo
	Cubilla 44', 57'; Maneiro 48'; Artime 68'; Célio 82', 88' (pen.)	Report	D. Onega 65'	Referee: Pablo Vega (Uruguay)

22 January 1970 2	Peñarol	2–1	River Plate	Centenario, Montevideo
	E. Onega 47', 49'	Report	Dominichi 8'	Referee: A. Boullosa (Uruguay)

27 January 1970 3	San Lorenzo de Almagro	5–3	River Plate	Centenario, Montevideo
	P. González 5', 57'; Fischer 14' (47); Villar 65'	Report	Más 15', 72' (pen.); Gennoni 66'	Referee: Ángel Pazos (Uruguay)

29 January 1970 4	Red Star Belgrade	1–3	River Plate	Centenario, Montevideo
	Džajić 22'	Report	Gennoni 5'; Montivero 24'; Minitti 86'	Referee: Oclides Leyton (Uruguay)

3 February 1970 5	Corinthians	1–3	River Plate	Centenario, Montevideo
	Suingue 87' (pen.)	Report	Gennoni 18'; D. Onega 76'; Trebucq 80'	Referee: Walter Reis (Uruguay)

==== Other friendlies ====
24 January 1970	River Plate	3–1	Mitsubishi Heavy Industries	Estadio Monumental, Belgrano
	Más 36'; Onishi 73' (o.g.); Gennoni 78'	Report	Ochiai 68'	Referee: Aldo Oviedo
Note: This was the first match in where a Japanese club would play in South America

13 February 1970	Gimnasia y Esgrima La Plata	1–3	River Plate	El Bosque, La Plata
	Onnis ?' (pen.)	Report	Néstor Scotta ?', ?'; Abel Vieytez ?'

22 February 1970	Gimnasia y Esgrima La Plata	1–0	River Plate	Estadio La Boutique, Córdoba
	R. Cortez 44'	Report		Referee: Carlos Carranza

26 February 1970	Deportivo Morón	2–1	River Plate	Francisco Urbano, Morón
	Gigliani ?', ?'	Report	Scotta ?'

21 June 1970	Central Norte	1–6	River Plate	Doctor Luis Güemes, Salta
	Cortéz 25' (pen.)	Report	Cortéz 10' (o.g.); Scotta 19' (52); Laraignée 20'; D. Onega 35'; Más 42'

1 August 1970 Copa Confraternidad	Boca Juniors	2–2 (a.e.t.) (1–2 p)	River Plate	Marcelo Bielsa, Rosario
	Cabrera 62'; Suñé 82'	Report	Laraignée 7'; Morete 42'	Referee: Jorge Omar Martínez Mayo
	Penalties
	Suñé (penalty scored) (penalty missed)		(penalty scored) (penalty scored) Más

1 August 1970 Copa Confraternidad	Newell's Old Boys	2–1	River Plate	Marcelo Bielsa, Rosario
	Obberti 30', 90'	Report	Más 22'	Referee: Roberto Goicochea

4 August 1970	Universitario de Deportes	0–2	River Plate	Estadio Nacional, Lima
		Report	Morete 27'; Más 32'	Referee: Carlos Rivero (Perú)

6 August 1970	Oriente Petrolero	0–2	River Plate	Departamental de Santa Cruz, Santa Cruz
		Report	Morete 22'; Más 35'	Referee: Héctor Puga (Bolivia)

9 August 1970	Cochabamba XI	2–4	River Plate	Félix Capriles, Cochabamba
	Casanova 32'; Meza 48'	Report	Más 39'; Montivero 41'; Marchetti 74'; Morete 81'	Referee: Miguel Aliaga (Bolivia)

13 August 1970 Charity match	The Strongest	2–3	River Plate	Hernando Siles, La Paz
	Bastida 70'; Pariente 87'	Report	D. Onega 4'; Minitti 8'; Más 43'	Referee: Arturo Ortubé (Bolivia)

17 August 1970	Instituto de Córdoba	2–2	River Plate	Juan Domingo Perón, Córdoba
	Lima 32'; Pirro 77'	Report	Más 40'; D. Onega 62'	Referee: Martín Eliseo Flores

23 August 1970	Jorge Newbery de Tucumán	1–5	River Plate	Jorge Newbery, Aguilares
	Herrera 65'	Report	Morete 25', 64'; Montivero 49'; Roberto Gutiérrez 51'; Más 90'	Referee: Pedro Alé
Note: This match was the debut of Didí as manager

29 September 1970	Patronato de la Juventud Católica	1–4	River Plate	Presbítero Bartolomé Grella, Paraná
	Escalada 16'	Report	Scotta 52', 54'; Gennoni 61', 88' (pen.)	Referee: Mario Castro

15 October 1970	Sportivo 25 de Mayo	0–1	River Plate	Buenos Aires
		Report	Scotta 46'	Referee: Armando González

21 October 1970	Chaco For Ever	1–2	River Plate	Juan Alberto García, Resistencia
	Olivera 15'	Report	Dominichi 75'; Dreyer 90'
Note: This match saw the debut of Norberto Alonso

21 October 1970	River Plate	1–0	Universidad de Chile	Estadio Monumental, Belgrano
	J. Martínez 16'	Report		Referee: Ángel Norberto Coerezza
