= 1972–73 Real Madrid CF season =

70th season in existence of Real Madrid CF

Real Madrid CF
1972–73 season
- President: Santiago Bernabéu
- Head coach: Miguel Muñoz
- Stadium: Santiago Bernabeu
- La Liga: 4th (in UEFA Cup)
- Copa del Generalísimo: Round of 16
- European Cup: Semi-finals
- Top goalscorer: League: Santillana (10); All: Santillana (15)
Home colours	Away colours	Third colours

The 1972–73 season was Real Madrid Club de Fútbol's 70th season in existence and the club's 41st consecutive season in the top flight of Spanish football.

== Summary ==
The club finished a disappointing fourth in the league five points behind champions Atlético Madrid. Meanwhile, in the Copa del Generalísimo the team was eliminated early in the round of 16 by Sporting Gijón, losing the away game 0–1 and achieving a miserable draw 1–1 at Santiago Bernabéu Stadium.

During February Santiago Bernabéu visited Israel and gave a medal to Moshe Dayan, a gesture which strained relations with Francisco Franco and becoming crucial to deny further government support for a new stadium project.

The squad reached the semi-finals of the European Cup where it was defeated twice by the defending champions and future winners Ajax Amsterdam who would go on to repeat their success in the following season, making it three in a row. President Santiago Bernabéu attended the Final himself expecting to sign Ajax starplayer Johan Cruyff who instead was ultimately signed by archrivals CF Barcelona during the summer transfer window. Real Madrid's offer for the Dutchman was reported to be significantly higher, but he refused to play for the club linked to Franco and his regime.

== Squad ==
Note: Flags indicate national team as defined under FIFA eligibility rules; some limited exceptions apply. Players may hold more than one non-FIFA nationality.

No.	Pos.	Nation	Player
—	GK	ESP	García Remón
—	DF	ESP	Goyo Benito
—	DF	ESP	Ignacio Zoco
—	DF	ESP	José Luis
—	DF	ARG	Touriño
—	MF	ESP	Pirri
—	MF	ESP	Velazquez
—	MF	ESP	Grande
—	FW	ESP	Santillana
—	FW	ESP	Amancio Amaro
—	FW	ESP	Ico Aguilar

No.	Pos.	Nation	Player
—	GK	ESP	Miguel Ángel
—	DF	ESP	Verdugo
—	FW	ESP	Ramón Grosso
—	MF	ESP	González
—	DF	ESP	Andrés
—	GK	ESP	Andrés Junquera
—	FW	ARG	Anzarda
—	DF	ESP	José Macanás Pérez
—	FW	ESP	Rafael Marañón
—	FW	ESP	Fermín Gutiérrez
—	MF	ESP	Fernandez

=== Transfers ===
In
Pos.	Name	from	Type
DF	Andrés	Cádiz CF	
DF	Macanás		–
FW	Fermín	Córdoba CF	–
FW	Fernández	–	–

Out
Pos.	Name	To	Type
DF	Pedro De Felipe	Español	
FW	Ortuño	Castellón	
GK	Borja	Español	–
FW	Miguel Pérez	Real Zaragoza	

== Competitions ==
=== La Liga ===
==== League table ====
Pos	Team	Pld	W	D	L	GF	GA	GD	Pts	Qualification or relegation
2	Barcelona	34	18	10	6	41	21	+20	46	Qualification for the UEFA Cup first round
3	Español	34	17	11	6	48	27	+21	45	Qualification for the UEFA Cup first round
4	Real Madrid	34	17	9	8	45	29	+16	43	Qualification for the UEFA Cup first round
5	Castellón	34	13	9	12	44	38	+6	35	
6	Valencia	34	12	10	12	37	33	+4	34	

Source: BDFútbol
Rules for classification: 1) Points; 2) Head-to-head results; 3) Goal difference; 4) Number of goals scored

==== Results by round ====
Round	1	2	3	4	5	6	7	8	9	10	11	12	13	14	15	16	17	18	19	20	21	22	23	24	25	26	27	28	29	30	31	32	33	34
Ground	H	A	H	A	H	A	H	A	H	A	H	A	A	H	A	H	A	A	H	A	H	A	H	A	H	A	H	A	H	H	A	H	A	H
Result	W	W	D	L	L	W	D	D	W	W	L	W	W	L	W	L	W	W	L	W	W	D	W	D	D	W	W	D	W	L	D	D	W	L
Position	3	3	4	6	9	6	8	7	5	4	6	6	4	4	4	5	4	4	4	4	3	3	3	3	3	3	3	4	4	4	4	4	4	4

Source: Competitive matches
A = Away; H = Home; W = Win; D = Draw; L = Loss; = Leader qualified to the 1973–74 European Cup; = Classified to the 1973–74 UEFA Cup; = Relegated to the 1973–74 Segunda División

==== Matches ====
3 September 1972 1	CD Castellón	2–3	Real Madrid	Castellón de la Plana
	Tonin 11'; Ortugno 60'	Report	25' Pirri; 35' Perez; 47' Aguilar	Stadium: Castalia; Referee: Fernando Alvarez

9 September 1972 2	Real Madrid	1–0	Sporting Gijón	Madrid
	Aguilar 89'; Amancio (yellow card)	Report	(yellow card) Paredes; (yellow card) Alonso	Stadium: Santiago Bernabeu; Referee: Ricardo Coscolin

17 September 1972 3	UD Las Palmas	1–1	Real Madrid	Las Palmas de Gran Canaria
	Deborah 62' (pen.)	Report	24' Velazquez; (yellow card) 65' (yellow-red card) Peinado; (yellow card) Grande	Stadium: Estadio Insular; Referee: Pelayo Sancristobal

23 September 1972 4	Real Madrid	0–1	Atlético Madrid	Madrid
	Pirri (yellow card)	Report	(red card) 9' Ovejero; 33' Ufarte; (yellow card) Aragones; (yellow card) Eusebio; (yellow card) Venegas	Stadium: Santiago Bernabeu; Referee: Jose Segreles

1 October 1972 5	CF Barcelona	1–0	Real Madrid	Barcelona
	Barrios 52'	Report		Stadium: Estadio del CF Barcelona; Referee: Jose Mendibil

7 October 1972 6	Real Madrid	2–1	Granada CF	Madrid
	Grande 29'; Santillana 57'	Report	74' Dueñas	Stadium: Santiago Bernabeu; Referee: Jose Capelastegui

22 October 1972 7	Real Zaragoza	0–0	Real Madrid	Zaragoza
	Ocampos (yellow card)	Report	(yellow card) Santillana	Stadium: La Romareda; Referee: Mariano Iglesias

29 October 1972 8	Real Madrid	0–0	Deportivo La Coruña	Madrid
	Zoco (yellow card)	Report		Stadium: Chamartín; Referee: Pablo Ibañez

5 November 1972 9	Valencia CF	0–1	Real Madrid	Valencia
		Report	1' Anzarda	Stadium: Estadio Mestalla; Referee: Pelayo Sancristobal

12 November 1972 10	Real Madrid	3–0	Real Oviedo	Madrid
	Amancio 26'; Amancio 41'; Santillana 88'	Report		Stadium: Santiago Bernabeu; Referee: Pablo Ibañez

19 November 1972 11	Real Betis	2–1	Real Madrid	Sevilla
	Sosa 23'; Roig 47'	Report	4' Santillana	Stadium: Estadio Benito Villamarin; Referee: Fernando Alvarez

26 November 1972 12	Real Madrid	2–0	Burgos	Madrid
	Grosso 19 ' Santillana 65 '	Report		Stadium: Santiago Bernabeu; Referee: Jaime Fortuny

12 December 1972 13	Real Madrid	1–0	Español	Madrid
	Santillana 10'	Report	(yellow card) Glaria	Stadium: Chamartín; Referee: Jose Mendibil

10 December 1972 14	Athletic Bilbao	2–1	Real Madrid	Bilbao
	Uriarte 7'; Lasa 57'	Report	39' Santillana	Stadium: San Mamés; Referee: Emilio Muro

17 December 1972 15	Real Madrid	6–1	Real Sociedad	Madrid
	Aguilar 41'; Aguilar 80'; Pirri 44' (pen.); Pirri 57'; Velazquez 51'; Santillana 60'; Zoco (yellow card)	Report	20' Araquistain; (yellow card) Cortabarilla; (yellow card) 45' (yellow-red card) Gorriti	Stadium: Santiago Bernabeu; Referee: Jose Antonolo

31 December 1972 16	CD Málaga	1–0	Real Madrid	Málaga
	Vilanova 44' (pen.) (yellow card); Bois (yellow card)	Report	(yellow card) Aguilar; (red card) 52' Velazquez	Stadium: Estadio La Rosaleda; Referee: Ricardo Coscolin

7 January 1973 17	Real Madrid	1–0	Celta de Vigo	Madrid
	Pirri 73'	Report		Stadium: Santiago Bernabeu; Referee: Emilio Arkimbau

21 January 1973 18	Real Madrid	2–0	Castellón	Madrid
	Corrales 29' (o.g.); Pirri 77'	Report	(yellow card) Corrales	Stadium: Santiago Bernabeu; Referee: Fernando Alvarez

28 January 1973 19	Sporting Gijón	1–0	Real Madrid	Gijón
	Churruka 27'	Report		Stadium: Estadio El Molinón; Referee: Angel Martinez

4 February 1973 20	Real Madrid	2–1	UD Las Palmas	Madrid
	Aguilar 47'; Santillana 57'	Report	68' (pen.) Deborah; (yellow card) Estevez; (yellow card) Marrero	Stadium: Chamartín; Referee: Vicente Bachero

11 February 1973 21	Atlético Madrid	1–2	Real Madrid	Madrid
	Becerra 70'; Capon (yellow card)	Report	57' (yellow card) Santillana; 87' Amancio	Stadium: Estadio Vicente Calderón; Referee: Pablo Ibañez

25 February 1973 22	Real Madrid	0–0	CF Barcelona	Madrid
		Report		Stadium: Estadio Santiago Bernabéu; Referee: Luis Diaz

4 March 1973 23	Granada CF	1–2	Real Madrid	Granada
	Porta 89'	Report	46' Pirri; 80' Aguilar	Stadium: Los Carmenes; Referee: Jose Mendibil

11 March 1973 24	Real Madrid	0–0	Real Zaragoza	Madrid
		Report		Stadium: Estadio Santiago Bernabéu; Referee: Mariano Iglesias

18 March 1973 25	Deportivo La Coruña	0–0	Real Madrid	La Coruña
		Report		Stadium: Estadio Riazor; Referee: Jose Capelastegui

25 March 1973 26	Real Madrid	2–1	Valencia CF	Madrid
	Velazquez 25'; Aguilar 37'	Report	51' (yellow card) Perez; (yellow card) Liko	Stadium: Estadio Santiago Bernabéu; Referee: Pelayo Sancristobal

1 April 1973 27	Real Oviedo	1–2	Real Madrid	Oviedo
	Galan 29'; Jacquet (yellow card)	Report	8' Aguilar; 67' Santillana	Stadium: Carlos Tartiere; Referee: Fernando Alvarez

7 April 1973 28	Real Madrid	1–1	Real Betis	Madrid
	Amancio 2' (pen.)	Report	85' Lopez	Stadium: Estadio Santiago Bernabéu; Referee: Jaime Fortuny

15 April 1973 29	Burgos	2–3	Real Madrid	Burgos
	Olalde 13'; Pocholo 82' (pen.)	Report	38' (pen.) Amancio; 49' Aguilar; 89' Zoco	Stadium: Estadio El Plantío; Referee: Emilio Muro

21 April 1973 30	Español	1–0	Real Madrid	Barcelona
	Solsona 65'	Report		Stadium: Estadio Sarria; Referee: Pelayo Sancristobal

6 May 1973 32	Real Sociedad	1–1	Real Madrid	San Sebastián
	Ansola 19'	Report	80' Amancio	Stadium: Atocha; Referee: Fernando Tijerina

9 May 1973 31	Real Madrid	3–3	Athletic Bilbao	Madrid
	Grande 80'; Pirri 83'; Amancio 88'; Peinado (yellow card)	Report	29' Lasa; 34' Rojo; 77' Lasa; (yellow card) Vilar; (yellow card) Zubiaga	Stadium: Estadio Santiago Bernabéu; Referee: Mariano Iglesias

13 May 1973 33	Real Madrid	2–0	CD Málaga	Madrid
	Amancio 24'; Pirri 62'	Report	(yellow card) Bustillo	Stadium: Estadio Santiago Bernabéu; Referee: Juan Elizondo

20 May 1973 34	Celta Vigo	3–0	Real Madrid	Vigo
	Touriño 58' (o.g.); Jimenez 70'; Doblas 79'	Report		Stadium: Estadio Balaídos; Referee: Ricardo Coscolin

=== Copa del Generalísimo ===
==== Round of 16 ====
27 May 1973	Sporting Gijón	1–0	Real Madrid	Gijón
		Report		Stadium: Estadio El Molinon

2 June 1973	Real Madrid	1–1 (1–2 agg.)	Sporting Gijón	Madrid
		Report		Stadium: Estadio Santiago Bernabéu

=== European Cup ===
==== Round of 32 ====
13 September 1972	Real Madrid (Spain)	3–0	(Iceland) Keflavík	Madrid
	Santillana 15', 30'; Grande 90'	Report		Stadium: Estadio Santiago Bernabéu

27 September 1972	Keflavík (Iceland)	0–1	(Spain) Real Madrid	Reykjavík
		Report	Verdugo 89'	Stadium: Laugardalsvöllur

==== Round of 16 ====
25 October 1972	Argeș Pitești (Romania)	2–1	(Spain) Real Madrid	Pitești
	Dobrin 22' (pen.); Prepurgel 62'	Report	Anzarda 41'	Stadium: Stadionul 1 Mai, Attendance: 15,000; Referee: (England) David Smith

9 November 1972	Real Madrid (Spain)	3–1	(Romania) Argeș Pitești	Madrid
	Santillana 18', 87'; Grande 46'	Report	Radu 44'	Stadium: Estadio Santiago Bernabéu

==== Quarter-finals ====
7 March 1973	Dynamo Kyiv (Soviet Union)	0–0	(Spain) Real Madrid	, Odesa (Note: Dynamo Kyiv played their home match at ChMP Central Stadium, Odesa, instead of their regular stadium Central Stadium, Kyiv, due to frozen pitch.)
17:00		Report		Stadium: ChMP Central Stadium; Attendance: 36,239; Referee: (Italy) Sergio Gonella

21 March 1973	Real Madrid (Spain)	3–0	(Soviet Union) Dynamo Kyiv	Madrid
21:30	Santillana 2'; Aguilar 36'; Amancio 81'	Report		Stadium: Estadio Santiago Bernabéu; Attendance: 27,949; Referee: (Austria) Erich Linemayr

==== Semi-finals ====
11 April 1973	Ajax (Netherlands)	2–1	(Spain) Real Madrid	Amsterdam
	Hulshoff 67'; Krol 77'	Report	Pirri 84'	Stadium: Olympisch Stadion

25 April 1973	Real Madrid (Spain)	0–1	(Netherlands) Ajax	Madrid
		Report	G. Mühren 50'	Stadium: Estadio Santiago Bernabéu

== Statistics ==
=== Players statistics ===
No.	Pos	Nat	Player	Total		La Liga		Copa del Generalisimo		European Cup	
No.	Pos	Nat	Player	Apps	Goals	Apps	Goals	Apps	Goals	Apps	Goals
	GK	(Spain) ESP	García Remón	35	-28	27	-20	2	-2	6	-6
	DF	(Spain) ESP	Goyo Benito	39	0	30	0	2	0	7	0
	DF	(Spain) ESP	Zoco	39	1	30	1	1	0	8	0
	DF	(Spain) ESP	José Luis	35	0	27+1	0	0	0	7	0
	DF	(Argentina) ARG	Touriño	33	0	26	0	2	0	5	0
	MF	(Spain) ESP	Pirri	39	10	30	8	2	1	7	1
	MF	(Spain) ESP	Grande	34	4	20+5	2	0+1	0	8	2
	MF	(Spain) ESP	Velazquez	39	3	28+1	3	2	0	8	0
	FW	(Spain) ESP	Amancio	34	9	25	8	2	0	7	1
	FW	(Spain) ESP	Santillana	35	15	29	10	0	0	6	5
	FW	(Spain) ESP	Ico Aguilar	37	10	24+5	9	2	0	5+1	1
	GK	(Spain) ESP	Miguel Ángel	10	-9	8	-9	0	0	2	0
	DF	(Spain) ESP	Verdugo	30	1	18+5	0	2	0	3+2	1
	FW	(Spain) ESP	Grosso	19	1	15+1	1	2	0	1	0
	MF	(Spain) ESP	González	18	0	8+5	0	1	0	1+3	0
	DF	(Spain) ESP	Andrés	18	0	7+6	0	1	0	2+2	0
	GK	(Spain) ESP	Junquera	1	0	0+1	0	0	0		
	FW	(Argentina) ARG	Anzarda	12	2	9+1	1	0	0	2	1
	DF	(Spain) ESP	Macanas	10	1	7+1	1	0	0	2	0
	FW	(Spain) ESP	Marañon	14	0	4+5	0	1+1	0	0+3	0
	FW	(Spain) ESP	Fermín Gutiérrez	7	0	2+4	0	0+1	0		
	MF	(Spain) ESP	Fernandez	3	0	1+1	0	0	0	1	0

- Source: http://www.bdfutbol.com/en/t/t1972-732.html
