= Sodero =

Sodero is a surname. Notable people with the surname include:

- Cesare Sodero (1886–1947), Italian conductor
- Javier Sodero (born 1964), Argentine footballer
