= José Macanás =

Spanish footballer (born 1954)

Personal information
- Full name: José Macanás Pérez
- Date of birth: 15 December 1953 (age 72)
- Place of birth: Los Ramos, Murcia, Spain
- Height: 1.69 m (5 ft 7 in)
- Position: Forward

Youth career
- 1968–1971: Real Murcia

Senior career*
| Years | Team | Apps | (Gls) |
| 1971–1972 | Real Murcia | | |
| 1972–1978 | Real Madrid | 55 | (10) |
| 1978–1981 | Hércules | 36 | (2) |
| 1981–1982 | Real Murcia | 21 | (0) |
| 1982–1984 | Granada | 55 | (6) |
| 1984–1985 | Orihuela Deportiva | 10 | (0) |
| 1985–1986 | Granada | 16 | (1) |

International career
| 1968–1972 | Spain amateur | 14 | (0) |
- * Club domestic league appearances and goals

José Macanás Pérez (born 15 December 1953) is a Spanish retired footballer. Nicknamed Pepe, he played as a forward for Real Madrid, Hércules and Granada throughout the 1970s and the 1980s, winning many titles with Madrid.

== Club career ==
Macanás was born on 15 December 1955 within the city of Murcia to a footballing family composed of his father and uncles. Due to his family standing, he was often gifted the best sporting equipment at the time which were an uncommon sight within his neighborhood of Los Ramos. Later, he began his career within Racing de la Flota. Following spells with Real Zaragoza and Barcelona, Francisco Canto offered Macanás a trial with Real Murcia and would remain within his home club throughout the remainder of his youth career. During the 1971–72 season, Murcia manager Cheché Martín, seeing how Macanás had established a reputation for being one of the best Spanish youth footballers, promoted him to the senior squad. However, when he was then listed on the transfer market for the following 1972–73 La Liga, many clubs immediately wanted to sign him with Atlético Madrid offering the first bid for him. However, Real Madrid ultimately won out and Macanás arrived at the Bernabéu for the Blancos' 1972–73 season. His subsequent seasons throughout the remainder of the 1970s saw him part of the golden generation, winning the 1974–75, 1975–76 and 1977–78 La Liga as well as winning the 1973–74 and the 1974–75 Copa del Generalísimo. However, his tenure with Madrid was also marked with injury and at times, had to miss out on plenty of matches due to long-term injuries.

Following his career with Madrid, Macanás began playing for Hércules for their 1978–79 season before briefly returning with Real Murcia for a brief stint. He then began playing for Granada for the remainder of his career apart from a single season stint with Orihuela Deportiva. Throughout his career with Granada, he was part of the winning squad for the 1982–83 Segunda División B. He retired with the Rojiblancos following their 1985–86 season.

== International career ==
Macanás was first called up to play for the Spain national amateur football team when he was only 16 years old under manager José Santamaría. He played five games under Santamaría and played 9 under his successor, Héctor Rial during the 1972 Summer Olympics qualifiers with Spain ultimately not qualifying for the tournament.
