= Teófilo Juárez =

Argentine footballer

Personal information
- Full name: Teófilo Romualdo Juárez
- Date of birth: 6 February 1910
- Place of birth: Santiago del Estero, Argentina
- Date of death: Unknown
- Height: 1.80 m (5 ft 11 in)
- Positions: Defender; midfielder

Youth career
- –1929: Central Córdoba (SdE)

Senior career*
Years	Team	Apps	(Gls)
1929–1931	Rosario Central	47	(20)
1932–1934	Chacarita Juniors	57	(7)
1934–1936	River Plate	56	(0)
1936	Atlético Madrid		
1937–1939	Tigre	64	(1)
1939	Racing	20	(0)
1940	São Paulo	19	(1)
1941	Palestra Itália	12	(0)
- * Club domestic league appearances and goals as of 18 June 2024

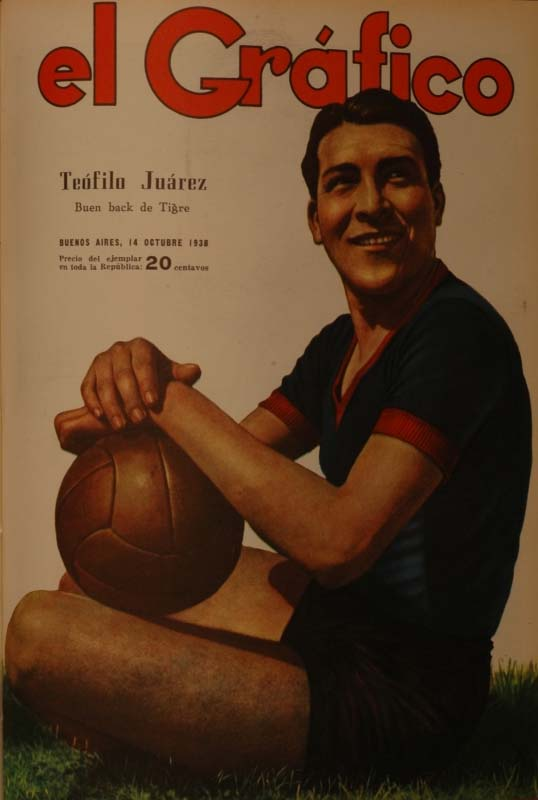
Juárez in El Gráfico, n. 1005, 1938

Teófilo Juárez (6 February 1910 – ?) was an Argentine professional footballer who played as a defender.

== Career ==
Nicknamed "El Índio" or "One-Man Squad", Teófilo Juárez began his career playing for Central Cordoba. In 1929, as a professional, he arrived at Rosario Central and acting as a midfielder he played 47 matches, scoring 20 goals and winning the 1930 Copa Nicasio Vila. He also had notable spells at Chacarita Juniors and River Plate, when in 1936 he became the first Argentine player to be traded to Spanish football. In function to the outbreak of the Spanish Civil War, he returned to Argentina and later played for Tigre and Racing Avellaneda. Before retiring, he had a spell in Brazilian football, playing for São Paulo and Palestra Itália (currently Palmeiras).

== Honours ==
Rosario Central

- Copa Nicasio Vila: 1930
