= Touriño =

Touriño is a Spanish surname. Notable people with the surname include:

- Emilio Pérez Touriño (born 1948), Spanish politician and economist
- Juan Carlos Touriño (1944–2017), Argentinian footballer
