= El Gráfico =

El Gráfico may refer to:

- El Gráfico (Argentina), an Argentine sports magazine
- El Gráfico (El Salvador), a Salvadoran sports newspaper
