= Fabio Talarico =

Argentinean footballer

Fabio Mario Talarico
Personal information
- Full name: Fabio Mario Talarico
- Date of birth: 15 August 1968 (age 58)
- Place of birth: Argentina
- Position: Midfielder

Senior career*
Years	Team	Apps	(Gls)
-1990	River Plate	22	(3)
1990/1991	Cannes	3	(0)
1991	Unión-SF	27	(2)
1993	Boca Juniors	1	(0)
- * Club domestic league appearances and goals

Fabio Talarico (born 15 August 1968 in Argentina) is an Argentinean retired footballer.
