= Roberto Coll =

Argentine footballer (1925–2013)

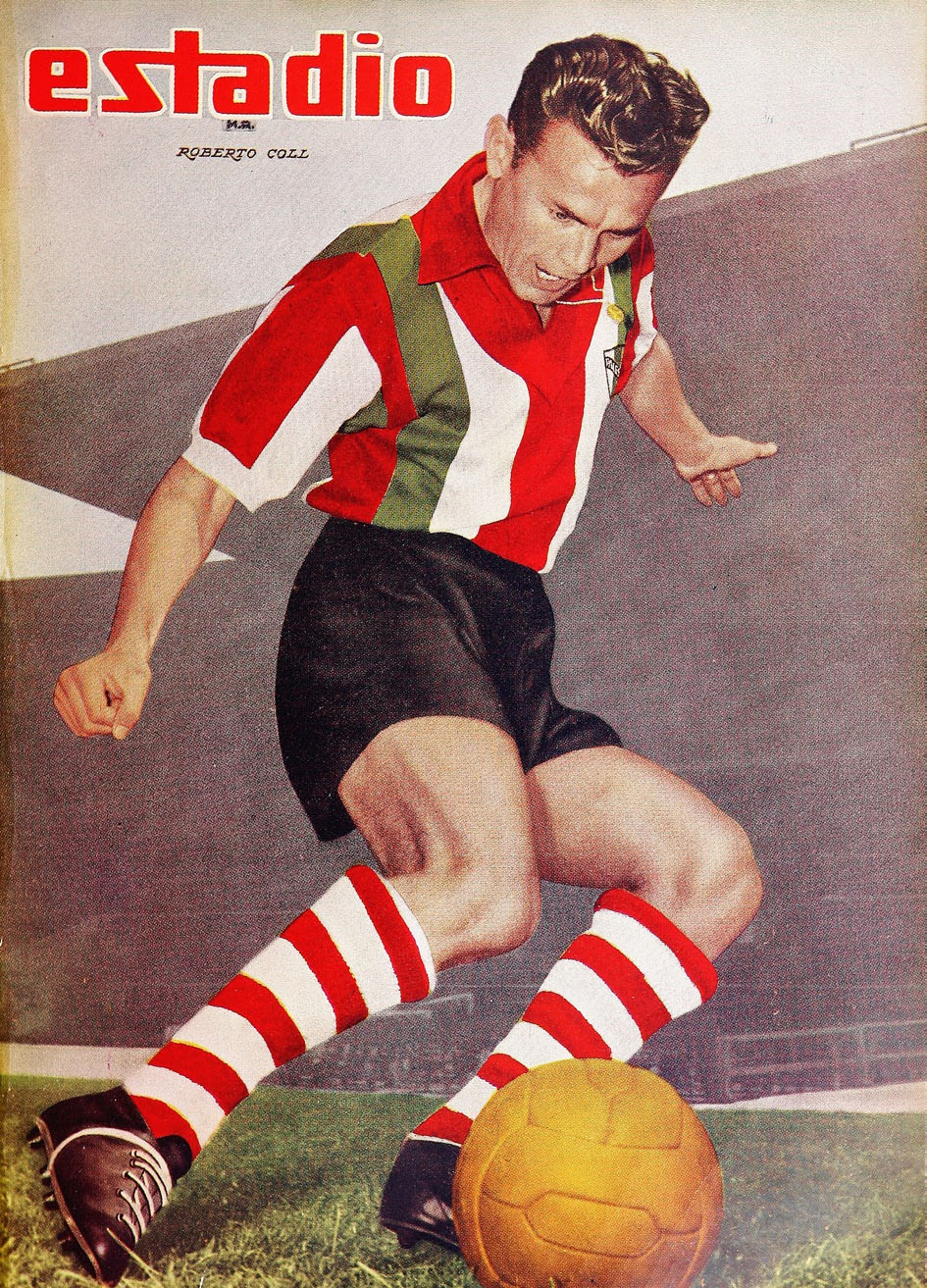
- Coll on the cover of Estadio in 1953

Personal information
- Full name: Roberto Emilio Coll Marengo
- Date of birth: 20 April 1925
- Place of birth: Buenos Aires, Argentina
- Date of death: 1 January 2013 (aged 87)
- Place of death: Buenos Aires, Argentina
- Position: Midfielder

Senior career*
Years	Team	Apps	(Gls)
1943–1950	River Plate		
1950–1952	Deportivo Cali		
1953–1968	Palestino	385	(133)
- * Club domestic league appearances and goals as of 21 January 2022

Roberto Emilio Coll Marengo (20 April 1925 − 1 January 2013) was an Argentine football player remembered by his spell at the Chilean club Palestino, where he was considered an icon of the 1955 Primera División de Chile title.

From 1943 to 1950, he was a member of one of the best if not the best version of River Plate: the team of La Máquina (1939−1949), where he began as a back-up player. Then, in 1950, he was part of a large group of Argentine players who left his country after troubles between the FAA (football trade union) and Juan Domingo Perón's first government (1946−1952). Thus, among the footballers who departed to Mexico, Colombia and also Cuba, Coll signed for the Colombian team Deportivo Cali in June 1950. In that way, Coll was part of the first golden age in Colombian football, which is known as El Dorado (1949−1953) and had players like Alfredo Di Stéfano, whose transference from Millonarios to Real Madrid finished the period.

In 1953, Coll was hired by the Chilean team Palestino, a freshly promoted team from Segunda División de Chile which was controlled by the wealthy Yarur family.

== Career ==
Coll began his career at River in 1943, when he was promoted to the first adult team by Renato Cesarini, the coach of «La Máquina» from 1939 to 1944. Two years later, aged 20, he made his debut in the 1945 Argentine Primera División with the new coach Carlos Peucelle (1944−1946), who often used in the starting lineup to José Manuel Moreno, Adolfo Pedernera or Ángel Labruna, who remained as starters with the last coach of La Máquina period, José María Minella, who arrived in 1947 and stayed until 1957, many years after the end of La Máquina. With Moreno's departure to the Chilean rich team Universidad Católica, Coll was a starter until mid-1950.

In 1950, Coll moved to Colombia and joined Deportivo Cali. In his successful second season with Cali, he scored 19 goals in 34 games.

=== Palestino ===
In 1953, Coll was contacted by the Argentine coach of Palestino, Antonio Ciraolo. In principle, he only came for three years, but he ended up staying for twelve years until he was 43. His elegant game, his improvisation on the field of play, and the ascendancy he had over his teammates positively called the attention of the football community.

In 1955, he was considered the main reference of the Palestino champion team, where he was accompanied by other talented players like Rodolfo Almeyda, José 'Peta' Fernández and Guillermo Díaz. In 1968, a severe knee injury prompted his decision to retire from professional football, after 16 seasons wearing the Palestino jersey. In that club, he recorded 133 goals in 385 games.

== Honors ==
=== Club ===
River Plate

- Primera División de Argentina (2): 1945, 1947

Palestino

- Primera División de Chile (1): 1955

== Sources ==
- Elsey, Brenda (2011). Citizen & Sportsmen: Fútbol & Politics in 20th-Century Chile. University of Texas Press. ISBN 9780292744714.
