= Pablo Erbín =

Argentine footballer (born 1965)

Pablo Erbín (born 7 October 1965) is an Argentine former footballer who is last known to have played as a defender for Huracán.

== Playing career ==
Besides Argentina, Erbín played in Mexico with Cruz Azul, and was most known for his stints with Argentine sides Boca and River.

== Managerial career ==
After retiring from professional football, Erbín worked as assistant manager of the Haiti national football team.
