= Juan Verdugo (Spanish footballer) =

Spanish footballer

Personal information
- Full name: Juan Verdugo Pérez
- Date of birth: 22 May 1949 (age 77)
- Place of birth: Montilla, Spain
- Height: 1.79 m (5 ft 10 in)
- Position: Defender

Youth career
- Séneca

Senior career*
Years	Team	Apps	(Gls)
1966–1967	Atlético Cordobés		
1967–1971	Córdoba	60	(1)
1971–1975	Real Madrid	75	(0)
1975–1983	Español	195	(2)

International career
1978	Spain	1	(0)

Managerial career
- 1989–1990: Córdoba
- 1992–1993: Iliturgi
- 1994: Córdoba
- 1995: Córdoba
- 1996: Córdoba (caretaker)
- 1998: Córdoba
- 2001: Córdoba
- * Club domestic league appearances and goals

Juan Verdugo Pérez (born 22 May 1949) is a Spanish former professional footballer who played as a defender.

== Career ==
A footballer from Córdoba, Spain, Verdugo is more known for having played for Real Madrid and Espanyol.

He represented the Spain national team in a match against Norway in 1978.

As a football manager, he led Córdoba CF in 1998 and 2001.

== Honours ==
Real Madrid

- Primera División (2): 1971–72, 1974–75
- Copa del Generalísimo (2): 1973–74, 1974–75
