= Jorge Dominichi =

Argentine footballer and manager

Jorge Dominichi (31 March 1947 – 25 April 1998) was an Argentine international football player who worked later as manager.

Jorge "El Gori" Dominichi started his career 1967 with CA River Plate in Buenos Aires. There he played until 1973 as a right back in 132 matches, scoring 8 goals. After this he moved to Spain playing until 1975 for second division side Córdoba CF and until 1977 for first division club Elche CF, for which he played in 46 league matches scoring one goal. He finished his playing years in 1978 back in Argentina with Gimnasia y Esgrima La Plata.

In 1967, he was the captain of Argentina's youth team, featuring among others Enrique Wolff, that won the sub-20 Copa América in Paraguay, albeit only by lot, after 2:2 in the final against the hosts. Between 1971 and 1973 he also played 13 times for the Argentina national team with which he reached fourth place in the 1972 Brazilian Independence Cup.

In later years he coached besides River Plate, Instituto Atlético Central Córdoba, Deportivo Maipú in Mendoza and Villa Dálmine in Buenos Aires. Last he was coaching youth teams of River Plate and travelling the country scouting for new talent.

In April 1998 he died aged 51 from a heart attack. He was laid to rest at Chacarita Cemetery in Buenos Aires. River Plate honoured him with a minute of silence in the Estadio Monumental.
