= Eduardo Dreyer =

Argentinian footballer (born 1948)

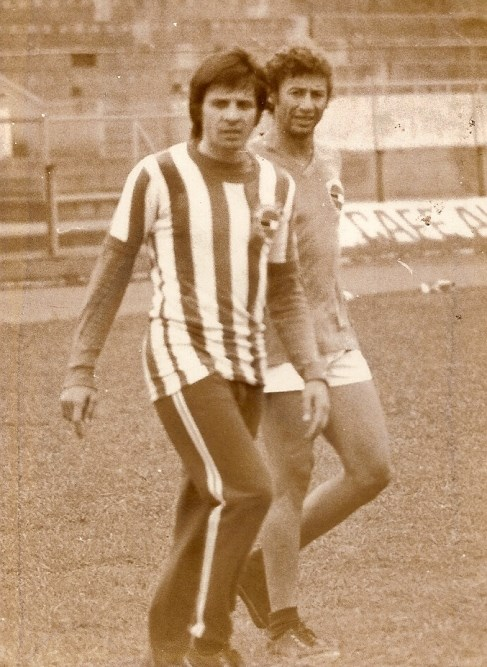
- Dreyer in 1976

Personal information
- Full name: Eduardo Francisco Dreyer
- Date of birth: 14 May 1948 (age 78)
- Place of birth: Córdoba, Córdoba Province, Argentina

Senior career*
Years	Team	Apps	(Gls)
1967–1968	Independiente		
1969–1971	River Plate		
1971–1975	Coritiba	132	(17)
1976–1977	Colorado		
1977	Londrina		
1978	Athletico Paranaense		
- * Club domestic league appearances and goals

Eduardo Francisco Dreyer (born 14 May 1948) is a retired Argentinian footballer. Sometimes known simply as Dreyer, he played as a midfielder for River Plate and Coritiba throughout the 1970s, being known as one of the best foreign players in the Campeonato Brasileiro Série A in the decade.

== Career ==
Dreyer began his career with Independiente but had his first notable stint with River Plate. He also attempted to get Carlos Aimar to play with River Plate with him but the club wouldn't pay his salary and ended up waiting a few more years until his professional debut. During his inaugural 1969 season, he was sent off the field eight times including the final of the 1969 Campeonato Metropolitano where they lost to Chacarita Juniors following a mere ten minutes of play. Around the end of the 1971 season, he was transferred over to play in Brazil for Coritiba. In his first full season with the club, he was a part of the winning squad of the 1972 Paraná Championship. He later went on to be a part of the winning squads for the 1973 People's Tournament as well as the 1975 Paraná Championship, distinguishing himself as one of the few foreign players to win three titles for the club. He'd soon transfer over to play for Colorado, Londrina and Athletico Paranaense following the 1975 season with 132 appearances and seventeen goals throughout his three seasons with the Coxa.

== Later life ==
Following his retirement from professional football, Dreyer briefly served as a manager in 1982 but would end up in a betting scandal that year, ending his brief tenure.
