= Javier Sodero =

Argentine footballer

Personal information
- Full name: Javier Osvaldo Sodero
- Date of birth: 17 July 1964 (age 62)
- Place of birth: Villa María, Argentina
- Position: Goalkeeper

Senior career*
Years	Team	Apps	(Gls)
1986–1992	Belgrano	169	(0)
1992–1995	River Plate	46	(0)
1996	Huracán	0	(0)
1996	Provincial Osorno	15	(0)
1997–1999	Chacarita Juniors	40	(0)
1999–2000	Deportivo Español	19	(0)
Total		289	(0)

Managerial career
- 1999–2011: River Plate (gk coach)
- 2012: Argentinos Juniors (gk coach)
- 2014–2015: Cerro Porteño (gk coach)
- 2015: Atlético Rafaela (gk coach)
- 2016–2017: Atlético Tucumán (gk coach)
- 2017–2018: Belgrano (gk coach)
- 2019: Colón (gk coach)
- 2022: Olimpia (gk coach)
- 2022–2023: Melgar (gk coach)
- 2023: Sarmiento (gk coach)
- 2024: The Strongest (gk coach)
- 2024–: River Plate (gk coach)
- * Club domestic league appearances and goals

Javier Osvaldo Sodero (born July 17, 1964, in Villa María (Córdoba), Argentina) is a former Argentine footballer who played for clubs of Argentina and Chile. He played as a goalkeeper.

== Playing career ==
=== Teams ===
- (Argentina) Belgrano de Córdoba 1986–1992
- (Argentina) River Plate 1992–1995
- (Argentina) Huracán 1996
- (Chile) Provincial Osorno 1996
- (Argentina) Chacarita Juniors 1997–1999
- (Argentina) Deportivo Español 1999–2000

== Coaching career ==
Sodero has developed a career as a goalkeeping coach. In 2024, he joined the technical staff of Marcelo Gallardo in River Plate.
