= Eduardo Anzarda =

Argentine footballer (born 1950)

- Anzarda in 1975 with Real Betis

Personal information
- Full name: Eduardo Aníbal Anzarda Álvarez
- Date of birth: January 25, 1950 (age 76)
- Place of birth: Buenos Aires, Argentina
- Height: 1.87 m (6 ft 2 in)
- Position: Striker

Youth career
- River Plate

Senior career*
Years	Team	Apps	(Gls)
1968–1971	River Plate	10	(3)
1969	→ Unión (loan)	7	(2)
1971–1973	Real Madrid	26	(7)
1973–1980	Betis	128	(40)
1980–1983	Platense	117	(40)
1984	All Boys	19	(4)
- * Club domestic league appearances and goals

Eduardo Aníbal Anzarda Álvarez (born 25 January 1950), usually known as ''Chavo'' Anzarda is an Argentine former professional football player who played as striker and former manager. A product of the River Plate youth academy, Anzarda had notable stints in LaLiga clubs Real Madrid and specifically Real Betis, where he won the Copa del Rey and promoted the team to the first division.

== Biography ==
Anzarda grew up in Palermo, Argentina. He has been nickamed "Chavo". Anzarda is the son of Edmundo Anzarda. He has an older sister.

== Club career ==
Anzarda started his career with Argentine side River. In 1969, he signed on loan for Argentine side Unión. In 1970. In 1971, he signed for Spanish La Liga side Real Madrid. In 1973, he signed for Spanish La Liga side Betis. In 1980, he signed for Argentine side Platense. In 1984, he signed for Argentine side All Boys.

Anzarda mainly operated as a striker. He was described as "represented cunning and elegance in front of the goal".

== Coaching career ==
Anzarda managed Argentine side Huracán de Tres Arroyos. He helped the club achieve promotion.

== Honours ==
Unión

- Petit Torneo: 1969

Real Madrid

- La Liga: 1971–72

Real Betis

- Segunda División: 1973–74
- Copa del Rey: 1976–77
