= Juan Carlos Trebucq =

Argentine footballer

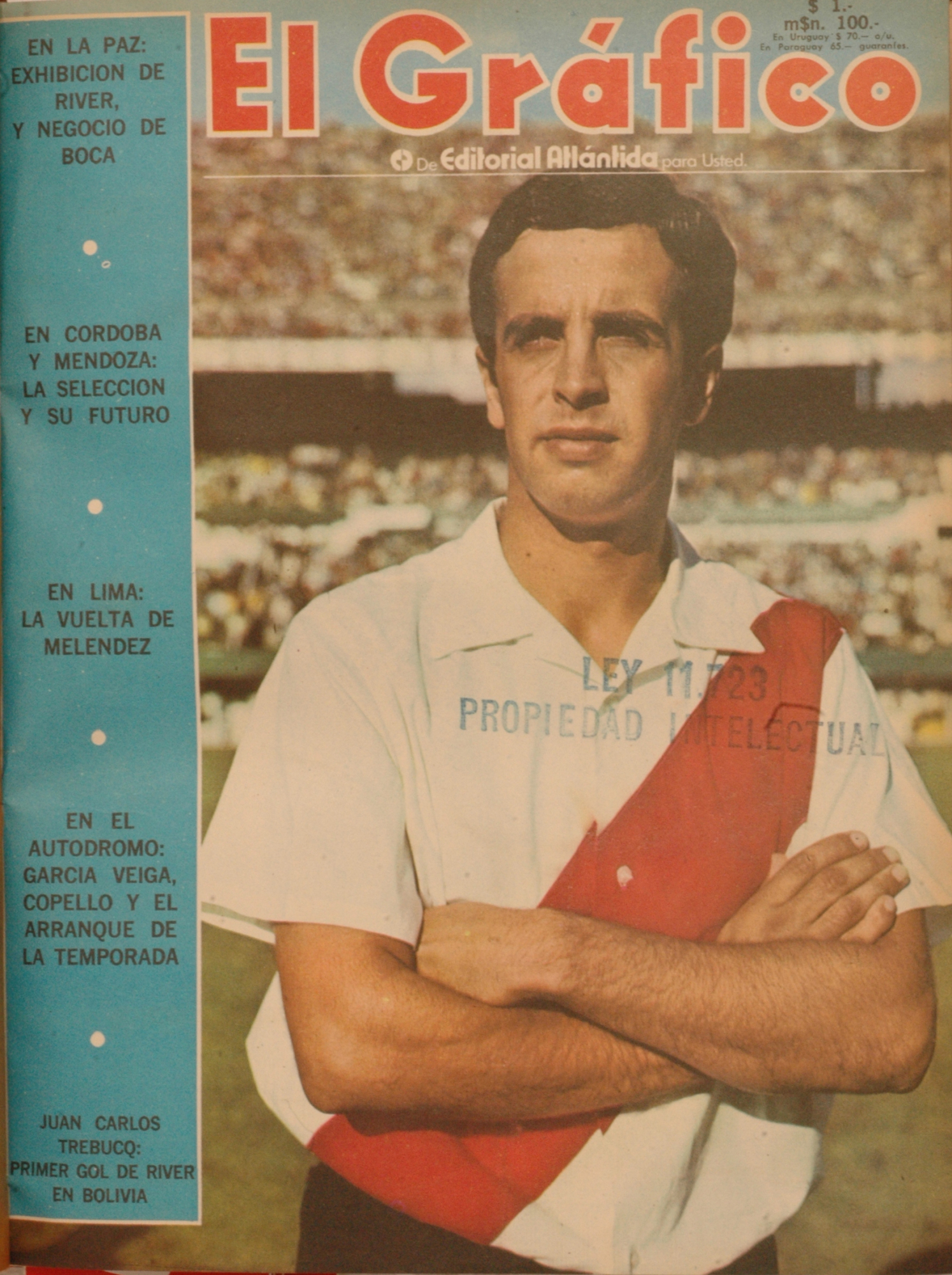

Personal information
- Full name: Juan Carlos Trebucq
- Date of birth: 6 August 1945 (age 81)
- Place of birth: Ensenada, Argentina
- Position: Striker

Senior career*
Years	Team	Apps	(Gls)
1965–1968	Gimnasia La Plata	99	(20)
1969–1971	River Plate	54	(11)
1972–1974	Troyes	38	(15)
1974–1975	Toulouse	19	(7)
- * Club domestic league appearances and goals

Juan Carlos "Mandrake" Trebucq (born 6 August 1945 in Ensenada) is an Argentine former football striker.

== Career ==
Trebucq started his career in 1965 with Gimnasia y Esgrima La Plata. In 1969, he joined Argentine club River Plate, and he helped the club reach the final of the 1969 Metropolitano championship.

After three seasons with River Plate, Trebucq moved to France where he played for Troyes and Toulouse.
