= Hugo Carballo =

Argentine-Chilean footballer (1944–1998)

Personal information
- Full name: Hugo Raúl Carballo
- Date of birth: 23 April 1944
- Place of birth: Resistencia, Argentina
- Date of death: 30 September 1998 (aged 54)
- Place of death: Resistencia, Argentina
- Position: Goalkeeper

Senior career*
Years	Team	Apps	(Gls)
1961–1964	Club Atlético Regional		
1964	→ Nueva Chicago (loan)		
1966–1968	Gimnasia y Esgrima	64	(0)
1969–1971	River Plate	54	(0)
1972–1974	Atlanta	118	(0)
1975–1982	Universidad de Chile		
1983	Santiago Wanderers		
1984	O'Higgins		
1985	Huachipato		
- * Club domestic league appearances and goals

Hugo Raúl Carballo (23 April 1944 – 30 September 1998) was an Argentine naturalized Chilean footballer who played as a goalkeeper for clubs of Argentina and Chile.

== Honors ==
River Plate

- Argentine Primera División runner-up: 1969

Universidad de Chile

- Copa Polla Gol: 1979
