= Néstor Scotta =

Argentine footballer

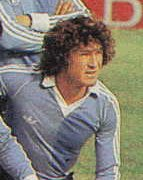

Personal information
- Full name: Néstor Leonel Scotta
- Date of birth: April 7, 1948
- Place of birth: San Justo, Argentina
- Date of death: January 8, 2001 (aged 52)
- Place of death: Campana, Argentina
- Position: Striker

Youth career
- Colón de San Justo

Senior career*
Years	Team	Apps	(Gls)
1967–1969	Unión de Santa Fe		
1970–1972	River Plate	43	(10)
1971	→ Grêmio (loan)	127	(63)
1973–1976	Racing Club	107	(79)
1977–1980	Deportivo Cali	23	(4)
1981	Platense		
1982–1983	Temperley		
1984	Colón de Santa Fe		
1985	Estudiantes (BA)		
1986	Excursionistas		
- * Club domestic league appearances and goals

Néstor Leonel Scotta (7 April 1948 – 8 January 2001) was an Argentine football striker who was twice top scorer in Copa Libertadores.

Néstor Tola Scotta was born in San Justo in 1948, he came from a footballing family, his father played for Colón de San Justo and his elder brother Héctor was an Argentina international and twice topscorer in Argentina.

Scotta began playing football with local side Colón de San Justo. In 1967, he joined Unión de Santa Fe for 600,000 pesos. He played for the club until 1969 when he joined River Plate for 10,000,000 pesos. He played 43 league games for River, scoring 10 goals.

In 1973, he joined Racing Club where he scored 63 goals in 127 league games.

Scotta joined Argentine manager Carlos Bilardo at Colombian side Deportivo Cali in 1977 where he was twice runner up in the Colombian league and runner up in Copa Libertadores 1977. During his time with the club he scored 79 goals in 109 games and was twice top scorer in the Copa Libertadores in 1977 and 1978.

In 1981 Scotta returned to Argentina where he played for Platense scoring 4 goals in 23 appearances. In 1982, he joined Temperley where he helped them secure promotion to the Primera División. In 1983, he was part of the Temperley team that secured their best ever finish in an Argentine championship when they reached the semi-final of the Nacional where they were beaten by eventual champions Estudiantes de La Plata.

Scotta played out the remainder of his career in the lower leagues of Argentine football with Colón de Santa Fe in 1984, Estudiantes de Buenos Aires in 1985 and Excursionistas in 1986.

Scotta died in a car accident on 8 January 2001 in Campana, aged 52.
